= 2019–20 Stephen F. Austin Ladyjacks basketball team =

Intercollegiate basketball season

2019–20 Stephen F. Austin Ladyjacks basketball
- Conference: Southland Conference
- Record: 23–6 (16–4 Southland)
- Head coach: Mark Kellogg (5th season)
- Assistant coaches: Rebecca Alvidrez; Jessica Grayson; Leonard Bishop
- Home arena: William R. Johnson Coliseum

2019–20 Southland Conference women's basketball standings
	Conf.				Overall
Team	W		L	PCT	W		L	PCT
Texas A&M-CC	17	–	3	.850	23	–	7	.767
Abilene Christian	16	–	4	.800	24	–	5	.828
Stephen F. Austin	16	–	4	.800	23	–	6	.793
Sam Houston State	14	–	6	.700	19	–	10	.655
New Orleans	13	–	7	.650	17	–	12	.586
Incarnate Word	10	–	10	.500	14	–	15	.483
Nicholls	10	–	10	.500	13	–	16	.448
Central Arkansas	9	–	11	.450	13	–	16	.448
Southeastern Louisiana	9	–	11	.450	12	–	17	.414
Lamar	6	–	14	.300	10	–	19	.345
Houston Baptist	4	–	16	.200	8	–	21	.276
Northwestern State	4	–	16	.200	7	–	22	.241
McNeese State	2	–	18	.100	5	–	24	.172
† 2020 Southland tournament winner As of March 7, 2020; Rankings from AP poll

The 2019–20 Stephen F. Austin Ladyjacks basketball team represented Stephen F. Austin University during the 2019–20 NCAA Division I women's basketball season. The Ladyjacks were led by fifth-year head coach Mark Kellogg and played their home games at the William R. Johnson Coliseum in Nacogdoches, Texas as members of the Southland Conference. They finished the season 23–6, 16–4 in Southland play, to finish in second place. Before they could play in the Southland women's tournament, however, the tournament was cancelled due to the coronavirus pandemic.

== Previous season ==
The Ladyjacks finished the 2018–19 season 25–7, 16–2 in Southland play, to finish in second place. They lost to Texas A&M–Corpus Christi in the semifinal round of the Southland women's tournament. The Ladyjacks received an at-large bid to the WNIT where they lost in the first round to UT Arlington.

== Roster ==
2019–20 Stephen F. Austin Lumberjacks women's basketball team
Players
Coaches

Pos.	#	Name	Height	Year	Previous school	Hometown
G	1	Noelle Yancy	5 ft 9 in (1.75 m)	Fr	Richardson HS	Dallas, TX
G	2	Alyssa Mayfield	5 ft 11 in (1.8 m)	Jr	John Tyler HS	Tyler, TX
G	3	Mikayla Hutchinson	5 ft 9 in (1.75 m)	Fr	Mansfield Timberview	New Orleans, LA
G	4	Kennedy Harris	5 ft 8 in (1.73 m)	Sr	Anderson HS	Austin, TX
G	5	Tasharian Robinson	5 ft 11 in (1.8 m)	So	Clear Springs HS / UTSA	Houston, TX
G	10	Brianna Mitchell	5 ft 4 in (1.63 m)	So	Anderson HS	Marshall, TX
F	12	Mariia Semenichenko	6 ft 4 in (1.93 m)	Jr	ASG College	Dnipro, Ukraine
F	13	Stephanie Visscher	6 ft 0 in (1.83 m)	So	BG Luleå	Luleå, Sweden
G	14	Marissa Banfield	5 ft 8 in (1.73 m)	Sr	Westbury Christian	Friendswood, TX
G	22	Zya Nugent	5 ft 7 in (1.7 m)	Fr	Denison HS	Denison, TX
F	23	Riley Harvey	6 ft 0 in (1.83 m)	Sr	Howe HS	Howe, TX
C	33	Aaliyah Johnson	6 ft 2 in (1.88 m)	Jr	Lee's Summit North HS	Lee's Summit, MO

Head coach

- Mark Kellogg (Austin College)

Assistant coach(es)

- Rebecca Alvidrez (Montana State)
- Jessica Grayson (Austin Peay)
- Leonard Bishop (East Texas A&M)

Legend

- (C) Team captain
- (S) Suspended
- (I) Ineligible
- (W) Walk-on
- Injured
- Current redshirt

Roster
Last update: April 15, 2025

== Schedule ==
Date time, TV	Rank^{#}	Opponent^{#}	Result	Record	Site (attendance) city, state
Non-conference regular season
November 5, 2019*; 7:00 a.m.		at Tulsa	W 67–63	1–0	Reynolds Center (851); Tulsa, OK
November 9, 2019*; 11:00 p.m.		Alcorn State	W 67–62	2–0	William R. Johnson Coliseum (1,288); Nacogdoches, TX
November 16, 2019*; 3:00 p.m., ESPN3		UCF	L 57–63	2–1	William R. Johnson Coliseum (2,147); Nacogdoches, TX
November 20, 2019*; 11:00 a.m., Fox Sports Go		at Oklahoma	L 62–75	2–2	Lloyd Noble Center (6,875); Norman, OK
November 29, 2019*; 6:30 p.m.		vs. UC Santa Barbara; Nugget Tournament	W 67–56	3–2	Lawlor Events Center (1,046); Reno, NV
December 1, 2019*; 4:00 p.m.		at Nevada; Nugget Tournament	W 80–65	4–2	Lawlor Event Center (857); Reno, NV
December 7, 2019*; 2:00 p.m., ESPN+		Central Christian College	W 104–46	5–2	William R. Johnson Coliseum (746); Nacogdoches, TX
December 15, 2019*; 2:00 p.m., ESPN3		LSU–Shreveport	W 75–32	6–2	William R. Johnson Coliseum (623); Nacogdoches, TX
Southland Conference regular season
December 18, 2019; 7:00 p.m.		at Houston Baptist	W 59–42	7–2 (1–0)	Sharp Gymnasium (113); Houston, TX
December 21, 2019; 2:00 p.m., ESPN+		McNeese State	W 82–51	8–2 (2–0)	William R. Johnson Coliseum (843); Nacogdoches, TX
Southland Conference non-conference season
December 29, 2019; 2:00 p.m., ESPN3		Our Lady of the Lake (San Antonio)	W 87–75	9–2	William R. Johnson Coliseum (580); Nacogdoches, TX
Southland Conference regular season
January 2, 2020; 6:30 p.m., ESPN3		Southeastern Louisiana	W 77–51	10–2 (3–0)	William R. Johnson Coliseum (634); Nacogdoches, TX
January 4, 2020; 4:00 p.m.		at New Orleans	L 50–53	10–3 (3–1)	Lakefront Arena (407); New Orleans, LA
January 8, 2020; 7:00 p.m.		at Texas A&M–Corpus Christi	W 66–44	11–3 (4–1)	Dugan Wellness Center (706); Corpus Christi, TX
January 15, 2020; 6:30 p.m., ESPN+		Central Arkansas	W 102–41	12–3 (5–1)	William R. Johnson Coliseum (1,038); Nacogdoches, TX
January 18, 2020; 2:00 p.m., ESPN3		Incarnate Word	W 67–45	13–3 (6–1)	William R. Johnson Coliseum (1,635); Nacogdoches, TX
January 22, 2020; 6:30 p.m., ESPN3		Northwestern State	W 89–40	14–3 (7–1)	William R. Johnson Coliseum (1,013); Nacogdoches, TX
January 25, 2020; 2:00 p.m., ESPN3		at Lamar	W 54–53	15–3 (8–1)	Montagne Center (1,058); Beaumont, TX
January 29, 2020; 5:00 p.m., ESPN+		Abilene Christian	W 69–59	16–3 (9–1)	William R. Johnson Coliseum (1,561); Nacogdoches, TX
February 1, 2020; 3:00 p.m., ESPN3		at Sam Houston State	L 55–63	16–4 (9–2)	Bernard Johnson Coliseum (1,286); Huntsville, TX
February 5, 2020; 6:00 p.m.		at Nicholls	W 78–61	17–4 (10–2)	Stopher Gymnasium (203); Thibodaux, LA
February 8, 2020; 2:00 p.m., ESPN3		New Orleans	W 59–47	18–4 (11–2)	William R. Johnson Coliseum (2,971); Nacogdoches, TX
February 12, 2020; 6:30 p.m., ESPN+		Texas A&M–Corpus Christi	W 72–49	19–4 (12–2)	William R. Johnson Coliseum (932); Nacogdoches, TX
February 19, 2020; 7:00 p.m.		at Central Arkansas	W 58–37	20–4 (13–2)	Farris Center (238); Conway, AR
February 22, 2020; 2:00 p.m.		at Incarnate Word	L 52–60	20–5 (13–3)	McDermott Center; San Antonio, TX
February 26, 2020; 1:00 p.m.		at Northwestern State	W 61–45	21–5 (14–3)	Prather Coliseum (601); Natchitoches, LA
February 29, 2020; 2:00 p.m., ESPN+		Lamar	W 70–50	22–5 (15–3)	William R. Johnson Coliseum (2,382); Nacogdoches, TX
March 3, 2020; 5:30 p.m., ESPN+		at Abilene Christian	L 62–88	22–6 (15–4)	Moody Coliseum (903); Abilene, TX
March 7, 2020; 2:00 p.m., ESPN+		Sam Houston State	W 64–50	23–6 (16–4)	William R. Johnson Coliseum (2,431); Nacogdoches, TX
2020 Hercules Tire Southland Basketball Tournament
March 14, 2020; 3:30 p.m., ESPN+		Winner of game 4 Semifinals	Canceled due to the COVID-19 pandemic		Merrell Center; Katy, TX
*Non-conference game. ^{#}Rankings from AP poll. (#) Tournament seedings in parentheses. All times are in Central.

== See also ==
- 2019–20 Stephen F. Austin Lumberjacks basketball team
