= 2019–20 Incarnate Word Cardinals women's basketball team =

Intercollegiate basketball season

2019–20 Incarnate Word Cardinals women's basketball
- Conference: Southland Conference
- Record: 14–15 (10–10 Southland)
- Head coach: Jeff Dow (1st season)
- Assistant coaches: Tanya Ray; Amber Cunningham; Beverly Holmes
- Home arena: McDermott Center (Capacity: 2,000)

2019–20 Southland Conference women's basketball standings
	Conf.				Overall
Team	W		L	PCT	W		L	PCT
Texas A&M-CC	17	–	3	.850	23	–	7	.767
Abilene Christian	16	–	4	.800	24	–	5	.828
Stephen F. Austin	16	–	4	.800	23	–	6	.793
Sam Houston State	14	–	6	.700	19	–	10	.655
New Orleans	13	–	7	.650	17	–	12	.586
Incarnate Word	10	–	10	.500	14	–	15	.483
Nicholls	10	–	10	.500	13	–	16	.448
Central Arkansas	9	–	11	.450	13	–	16	.448
Southeastern Louisiana	9	–	11	.450	12	–	17	.414
Lamar	6	–	14	.300	10	–	19	.345
Houston Baptist	4	–	16	.200	8	–	21	.276
Northwestern State	4	–	16	.200	7	–	22	.241
McNeese State	2	–	18	.100	5	–	24	.172
† 2020 Southland tournament winner As of March 7, 2020; Rankings from AP poll

The 2019–20 Incarnate Word Cardinals women's basketball team represented the University of the Incarnate Word in the 2019–20 NCAA Division I women's basketball season. The Cardinals, led by first-year head coach Jeff Dow, played their home games at the McDermott Center in San Antonio, Texas and were members of the Southland Conference. They finished the season 14–15, 10–10 in Southland play, to finish in sixth place. Before they could play in the Southland women's tournament, however, the tournament was cancelled due to the coronavirus pandemic.

== Previous season ==
The Cardinals finished the 2018–19 season 5–24, 5–13 in Southland play, to finish in a tie for tenth place. They failed to qualify for the Southland women's tournament.

On March 10, head coach Christy Smith's contract was not renewed. She finished with a three-year record of 21–68.

== Roster ==
2019–20 Incarnate Word Cardinals women's basketball team
Players
Coaches

Pos.	#	Name	Height	Year	Previous school	Hometown
G	0	Macy Ray	5 ft 7 in (1.7 m)	So	Katy Taylor HS	Katy, TX
F	1	Alexis Henry	6 ft 1 in (1.85 m)	Sr	Southeast HS; Moberly Area CC	Springfield, IL
F	2	Lunden Henry	6 ft 1 in (1.85 m)	Sr	Southeast HS; Moberly Area CC	Springfield, IL
G	3	Alexandra Busby-Leija	5 ft 8 in (1.73 m)	Sr	Southwest HS	San Antonio, TX
G	4	Destiny Jenkins	5 ft 4 in (1.63 m)	RS Fr	Stevens HS	San Antonio, TX
SG	5	Kara Speer	5 ft 9 in (1.75 m)	Jr	Metro Christian Academy	Tulsa, OK
SG	10	Victoria Jackson	5 ft 5 in (1.65 m)	Sr	Cedar Hill HS	Cedar Hill, TX
G	11	Imani Robinson	5 ft 11 in (1.8 m)	Sr	Cedar Ridge HS	Round Rock, TX
G	12	Angelica Wiggins	5 ft 9 in (1.75 m)	Sr	Hopkins HS; Moberly Area CC	Toronto, ON
F	15	Starr Omozee	5 ft 10 in (1.78 m)	So	Pflugerville HS	Pflugerville, TX
F	20	Charmaine McBride	5 ft 9 in (1.75 m)	Sr	Vista Ridge HS	Cedar Park, TX
G	21	Taryn Wills	5 ft 7 in (1.7 m)	Fr	Cedar Ridge HS	Round Rock, TX
G	23	Brittney Stafford	5 ft 3 in (1.6 m)	Fr	Atascocita HS	Crosby, TX
F	35	Casey Carangelo	6 ft 1 in (1.85 m)	RS So	Thomaston HS; St. Francis College	Thomaston, CT

Head coach

Jeff Dow

Assistant coach(es)

Tanya Ray
Amber Cunningham
Beverly Holmes

Legend

- (C) Team captain
- (S) Suspended
- (I) Ineligible
- (W) Walk-on
- Injured
- Current redshirt

Roster
Last update: November 1, 2024

== Schedule ==
Date time, TV	Opponent	Result	Record	High points	High rebounds	High assists	Site (attendance) city, state
Non-conference regular season
November 5, 2019*; 6:30 p.m.	Schreiner	W 70–35	1–0	19 – Henry, A	8 – Henry, A	4 – Henry, L	McDermott Center (528); San Antonio, TX
November 11, 2019*; 7:00 p.m.	at UTSA	L 56–63	1–1	10 – Ray	7 – Speer	4 – Omozee	Convocation Center (482); San Antonio, TX
November 19, 2019*; 11:00 a.m.	Texas A&M International	W 55–38	2–1	12 – Ray	8 – tied, 2	3 – Ray	McDermott Center (1,375); San Antonio, TX
November 23, 2019*; 12:00 p.m.	at Ohio	L 41–78	2–2	13 – Robinson	9 – Speer	1 – tied, 7	Convocation Center (572); Athens, OH
November 26, 2019*; 8:00 p.m.	at Colorado State	L 47–75	2–3	11 – Jackson	7 – Speer	4 – Speer	Moby Arena (73); Fort Collins, CO
December 3, 2019*; 6:30 p.m., ESPN+	at Kansas State	L 41–85	2–4	13 – Stafford	7 – Speer	3 – Speer	Bramlage Coliseum (2,546); Manhattan, KS
December 14, 2019*; 2:00 p.m.	St. Thomas (Texas)	W 74–52	3–4	19 – Robinson	10 – Speer	3 – tied, 3	McDermott Center (210); San Antonio, TX
Southland regular season
December 18, 2019; 6:30 p.m.	Central Arkansas	L 37–47	3–5 (0–1)	12 – tied, 2	7 – tied, 2	3 – Langhi	McDermott Center; San Antonio, TX
Non-conference regular season
December 21, 2019*; 2:00 p.m.	at San Diego State	L 48–57	3–6	21 – Robinson	11 – Speer	2 – Robinson	Viejas Arena (255); San Diego, CA
December 28, 2019*; 2:00 p.m.	Paul Quinn	W 79–62	4–6	17 – McBride	12 – Speer	5 – Robinson	McDermott Center; San Antonio, TX
Southland regular season
January 2, 2020; 6:30 p.m.	Nicholls	W 53–51	5–6 (1–1)	13 – Robinson	7 – Robinson	2 – Ray	McDermott Center (110); San Antonio, TX
January 8, 2020; 6:30 p.m.	at Northwestern State	W 69–67 ^{OT}	6–6 (2–1)	21 – Robinson	12 – Speer	4 – Robinson	Prather Coliseum (547); Natchitoches, LA
January 11, 2020; 2:00 p.m.	New Orleans	L 55–67	6–7 (2–2)	25 – Robinson	9 – Robinson	4 – Wiggins	McDermott Center (137); San Antonio, TX
January 15, 2020; 6:30 p.m.	McNeese State	W 73–56	7–7 (3–2)	16 – Ray	7 – Henry	3 – Ray	McDermott Center (400); San Antonio, TX
January 18, 2020; 2:00 p.m., ESPN3	at Stephen F. Austin	L 45–67	7–8 (3–3)	10 – Wiggins	5 – Speer	3 – Robinson	William R. Johnson Coliseum (1,635); Nacogdoches, TX
January 22, 2020; 7:00 p.m., ESPN+	at Lamar	W 67–48	8–8 (4–3)	16 – Robinson	8 – Speer	6 – Robinson	Montagne Center (928); Beaumont, TX
January 25, 2020; 2:00 p.m.	Texas A&M–Corpus Christi	W 64–38	8–9 (4–4)	9 – Robinson	6 – Speer	3 – Wiggins	McDermott Center (181); San Antonio, TX
January 29, 2020; 6:30 p.m.	Houston Baptist	L 55–60	8–10 (4–5)	13 – Henry	10 – Speer	2 – Ray	McDermott Center (337); San Antonio, TX
February 1, 2020; 4:30 p.m., ESPN3	at Abilene Christian	W 71–70	9–10 (5–5)	20 – Robinson	7 – Henry	8 – Robinson	Moody Coliseum (732); Abilene, TX
February 5, 2020; 6:30 p.m., ESPN3	at Sam Houston State	W 77–74	10–10 (6–5)	31 – Robinson	9 – Robinson	3 – Jackson	Bernard Johnson Coliseum (599); Huntsville, TX
February 8, 2020; 1:00 p.m.	at Southeastern Louisiana	L 44–58	10–11 (6–6)	15 – Robinson	6 – Speer	3 – Robinson	University Center (829); Hammond, LA
February 12, 2020; 6:30 p.m.	Northwestern State	W 76–39	11–11 (7–6)	22 – Wiggins	9 – Omozee	4 – Robinson	McDermott Center (371); San Antonio, TX
February 15, 2020; 4:00 p.m.	at New Orleans	L 57–61	11–12 (7–7)	14 – Ray	8 – Henry	3 – Wiggins	Lakefront Arena (166); New Orleans, LA
February 19, 2020; 6:30 p.m.	at McNeese State	W 72–71	12–12 (8–7)	17 – Robinson	9 – Robinson	4 – Jackson	H&HP Complex (2,344); Lake Charles, LA
February 22, 2020; 2:00 p.m.	Stephen F. Austin	W 60–52	13–12 (9–7)	20 – Robinson	8 – Speer	6 – Robinson	McDermott Center; San Antonio, TX
February 26, 2020; 6:30 p.m.	Lamar	W 68–67 ^{OT}	14–12 (10–7)	21 – Robinson	7 – Robinson	4 – Robinson	McDermott Center (326); San Antonio, TX
February 29, 2020; 1:00 p.m.	at Texas A&M–Corpus Christi	L 50–56	14–13 (10–8)	17 – Robinson	8 – Henry	3 – Wiggins	American Bank Center (1,483); Corpus Christi, TX
March 4, 2020; 7:00 p.m.	at Houston Baptist	L 49–66	14–14 (10–9)	12 – Henry	8 – Speer	2 – Omozee	Sharp Gymnasium (212); Houston, TX
March 7, 2020; 2:00 p.m.	Abilene Christian	L 69–76 ^{OT}	14–15 (10–10)	23 – Ray	13 – Robinson	6 – Robinson	McDermott Center (498); San Antonio, TX
2020 Hercules Tires Southland Basketball Tournament
March 12, 2020; 1:30 p.m., ESPN+	vs. Nicholls	Canceled due to the COVID-19 pandemic					Merrell Center; Katy, TX
*Non-conference game. ^{#}Rankings from AP poll. (#) Tournament seedings in parentheses. All times are in Central.

== See also ==
- 2019–20 Incarnate Word Cardinals men's basketball team
