= 2019–20 Central Arkansas Sugar Bears basketball team =

Intercollegiate basketball season

2019–20 Central Arkansas Sugar Bears basketball
- Conference: Southland Conference
- Record: 13–16 (9–11 Southland)
- Head coach: Sandra Rushing (8th season)
- Assistant coaches: Jason Conner; Nakeia Guiden; Jordan Rogers
- Home arena: Farris Center (Capacity: 6,000)

2019–20 Southland Conference women's basketball standings
	Conf.				Overall
Team	W		L	PCT	W		L	PCT
Texas A&M-CC	17	–	3	.850	23	–	7	.767
Abilene Christian	16	–	4	.800	24	–	5	.828
Stephen F. Austin	16	–	4	.800	23	–	6	.793
Sam Houston State	14	–	6	.700	19	–	10	.655
New Orleans	13	–	7	.650	17	–	12	.586
Incarnate Word	10	–	10	.500	14	–	15	.483
Nicholls	10	–	10	.500	13	–	16	.448
Central Arkansas	9	–	11	.450	13	–	16	.448
Southeastern Louisiana	9	–	11	.450	12	–	17	.414
Lamar	6	–	14	.300	10	–	19	.345
Houston Baptist	4	–	16	.200	8	–	21	.276
Northwestern State	4	–	16	.200	7	–	22	.241
McNeese State	2	–	18	.100	5	–	24	.172
† 2020 Southland tournament winner As of March 7, 2020; Rankings from AP poll

The 2019–20 Central Arkansas Sugar Bears basketball team represented the University of Central Arkansas during the 2019–20 NCAA Division I women's basketball season. The Sugar Bears were led by eighth-year head coach Sandra Rushing and played their home games at the Farris Center. They were members of the Southland Conference.

== Roster ==
2019–20 Central Arkansas Sugar Bears women's basketball team
Players
Coaches

Pos.	#	Name	Height	Year	Previous school	Hometown
G/F	0	Briana Trigg	5 ft 10 in (1.78 m)	Jr	Strawberry Crest HS; Shelton State	Tampa, FL
G	1	Brionna Budgetts	5 ft 8 in (1.73 m)	Fr	Lincoln Prep Academy	Kansas City, MO
F	2	Ayanna Trigg	5 ft 11 in (1.8 m)	Sr	Strawberry Crest HS; Shelton State	Tampa, FL
F	3	Romola Dominguez	5 ft 7 in (1.7 m)	So	Bear Creek HS; South Plains CC	Denver, CO
G	4	Taylor Sells	5 ft 7 in (1.7 m)	Sr	Booker T. Washington HS	Tulsa, OK
G	11	Savanna Walker	5 ft 7 in (1.7 m)	Jr	Woodville-Tompkins HS; East Georgia College	Savannah, GA
G	12	Carley Hudspeth	5 ft 11 in (1.8 m)	So	Kirk Academy	Grenada, MS
F	15	Terri Crawford	6 ft 1 in (1.85 m)	Fr	Ramsay HS	Birmingham, AL
G/F	22	Alana Canady	5 ft 11 in (1.8 m)	So	Sylvan Hills HS	Sherwood, AR
G	25	Jalisa Outlaw	5 ft 6 in (1.68 m)	Fr	Starkville HS	Starkville, MS
C	42	Hannah Langhi	6 ft 2 in (1.88 m)	Jr	Marshall County HS	Hardin, KY

Head coach

- Sandra Rushing (Alabama)

Assistant coach(es)

- Jason Conner (Delta State)
- Nakeia Guiden
- Jordan Rogers

Legend

- (C) Team captain
- (S) Suspended
- (I) Ineligible
- (W) Walk-on
- Injured
- Current redshirt

Roster
Last update: July 31, 2024

== Schedule ==
Date time, TV	Rank^{#}	Opponent^{#}	Result	Record	Site (attendance) city, state
Non-conference regular schedule
November 7, 2019*; 6:00 p.m., SECN+		at Tennessee	L 36–63	0–1	Thompson–Boling Arena (7,278); Knoxville, TN
November 12, 2019*; 7:00 p.m.		Hendrix College	L 28–104	1–1	Farris Center (357); Conway, AR
November 16, 2019*; 2:00 p.m.		at Little Rock; Governor's I-40 Showdown	L 48–63	1–2	Jack Stephens Center (807); Little Rock, AR
November 22, 2019*; 12:00 p.m.		at Tulane	L 38–65	1–3	Devlin Fieldhouse (1,307); New Orleans, LA
November 25, 2019*; 10:00 a.m.		at Northern Kentucky	L 56–72	1–4	BB&T Arena (3,042); Highland Heights, KY
November 30, 2019*; 1:00 p.m.		Jackson State	W 57–54	2–4	Farris Center (312); Conway, AR
December 4, 2019*; 11:00 a.m., SECN+		at Texas A&M	L 46–76	2–5	Reed Arena (6,450); College Station, TX
December 7, 2019*; 7:00 p.m.		Crowley's Ridge	W 82–26	3–5	Farris Center (87); Conway, AR
December 15, 2019*; 3:00 p.m.		Central Baptist College	W 66–43	4–5	Farris Center (297); Conway, AR
Southland Conference schedule
December 18, 2019; 6:30 p.m.		at Incarnate Word	W 47–37	5–5 (1–0)	McDermott Center (142); San Antonio, TX
December 21, 2019; 1:00 p.m.		at Texas A&M–Corpus Christi	L 47–67	5–6 (1–1)	Dugan Wellness Center (700); Corpus Christi, TX
January 1, 2020; 1:00 p.m.		Houston Baptist	W 63–39	6–6 (2–1)	Farris Center (102); Conway, AR
January 4, 2020; 1:00 p.m.		at McNeese State	W 70–57	7–6 (3–1)	H&HP Complex (2,137); Lake Charles, LA
January 8, 2020; 7:00 p.m.		New Orleans	L 37–49	7–7 (3–2)	Farris Center (329); Conway, AR
January 11, 2020; 1:00 p.m.		Sam Houston State	L 54–72	7–8 (3–3)	Farris Center (572); Conway, AR
January 15, 2020; 6:30 p.m., ESPN+		at Stephen F. Austin	L 41–102	7–9 (3–4)	William R. Johnson Coliseum (1,038); Nacogdoches, TX
January 18, 2020; 1:00 p.m., ESPN3		at Nicholls	W 53–46	8–9 (4–4)	Stopher Gymnasium (411); Thibodaux, LA
January 25, 2020; 1:00 p.m.		Abilene Christian	L 64–74	8–10 (4–5)	Farris Center (685); Conway, AR
January 29, 2020; 7:00 p.m.		at Southeastern Louisiana	L 42–63	8–11 (4–6)	University Center (592); Hammond, LA
February 1, 2020; 1:00 p.m.		at Northwestern State	W 51–44	9–11 (5–6)	Prather Coliseum (554); Natchitoches, LA
February 5, 2020; 7:00 p.m.		Lamar	W 53–29	10–11 (6–6)	Farris Center (592); Conway, AR
February 8, 2020; 1:00 p.m.		McNeese State	W 70–49	11–11 (7–6)	Farris Center (555); Conway, AR
February 12, 2020; 7:00 p.m.		at New Orleans	L 73–85	11–12 (7–7)	Lakefront Arena (236); New Orleans, LA
February 15, 2020; 1:00 p.m.		at Sam Houston State	L 58–73	11–13 (7–8)	Bernard Johnson Coliseum (350); Huntsville, TX
February 19, 2020; 7:00 p.m.		Stephen F. Austin	L 37–58	11–14 (7–9)	Farris Center (238); Conway, AR
February 22, 2020; 1:00 p.m.		Nicholls	L 58–67	11–15 (7–10)	Farris Center (248); Conway, AR
February 29, 2020; 1:00 p.m., ESPN+		at Abilene Christian	L 71–93	11–16 (7–11)	Moody Coliseum (1,011); Abilene, TX
March 4, 2020; 7:00 p.m.		Southeastern Louisiana	W 54–47	12–16 (8–11)	Farris Center (86); Conway, AR
March 7, 2020; 1:00 p.m.		Northwestern State	W 80–62	13–16 (9–11)	Farris Center (613); Conway, AR
*Non-conference game. ^{#}Rankings from AP poll. (#) Tournament seedings in parentheses. All times are in Central.

== See also ==
- 2019–20 Central Arkansas Bears basketball team
