= 2019–20 Texas A&M–Corpus Christi Islanders women's basketball team =

Intercollegiate basketball season

2019–20 Texas A&M–Corpus Christi Islanders women's basketball
- Conference: Southland Conference
- Record: 23–7 (17–3 Southland)
- Head coach: Royce Chadwick (7th season)
- Assistant coaches: Roxanne White; Darren Brunson; Sherrie Tucker
- Home arena: American Bank Center; Dugan Wellness Center

2019–20 Southland Conference women's basketball standings
	Conf.				Overall
Team	W		L	PCT	W		L	PCT
Texas A&M-CC	17	–	3	.850	23	–	7	.767
Abilene Christian	16	–	4	.800	24	–	5	.828
Stephen F. Austin	16	–	4	.800	23	–	6	.793
Sam Houston State	14	–	6	.700	19	–	10	.655
New Orleans	13	–	7	.650	17	–	12	.586
Incarnate Word	10	–	10	.500	14	–	15	.483
Nicholls	10	–	10	.500	13	–	16	.448
Central Arkansas	9	–	11	.450	13	–	16	.448
Southeastern Louisiana	9	–	11	.450	12	–	17	.414
Lamar	6	–	14	.300	10	–	19	.345
Houston Baptist	4	–	16	.200	8	–	21	.276
Northwestern State	4	–	16	.200	7	–	22	.241
McNeese State	2	–	18	.100	5	–	24	.172
† 2020 Southland tournament winner As of March 7, 2020; Rankings from AP poll

The 2019–20 Texas A&M–Corpus Christi Islanders women's basketball team represented Texas A&M University–Corpus Christi in the 2019–20 NCAA Division I women's basketball season. The Islanders were led by seventh-year head coach Royce Chadwick, and played their home games at the American Bank Center and the Dugan Wellness Center, as members of the Southland Conference. They finished the season 23–7, 17–3 in Southland play to finish in first place. Before they could play in the Southland women's tournament however, the tournament was cancelled due to the coronavirus pandemic.

== Previous season ==
The Islanders finished the 2018–19 season 17–16 overall, 8–10 in Southland play to finish in a tie for sixth place. As the No. 6 seed in the Southland women's tournament, they defeated New Orleans in the first round, Nicholls in the quarterfinals, Stephen F. Austin in the semifinals, before losing a close game to No. 4 seed Abilene Christian, 68–69 in the championship game.

== Media ==
Video streaming of all non-televised home games and audio for all road games is available at GoIslanders.com.

== Roster ==
2019–20 Texas A&M–Corpus Christi Islanders women's basketball team
Players
Coaches

Pos.	#	Name	Height	Year	Previous school	Hometown
F	1	Giana Wright	5 ft 11 in (1.8 m)	Jr	Castro Valley HS	Castro Valley, CA
F	2	Alexes Bryant	6 ft 3 in (1.91 m)	Sr	New Mexico Junior College	Cibolo, Texas
G	3	Torrionna Nesbitt	5 ft 8 in (1.73 m)	So	Steele HS	Cibolo, Texas
G	120	Hayle Campbell	5 ft 7 in (1.7 m)	Fr	Flour Bluff HS	Corpus Christi, TX
G	11	La'Janeira Robinson	5 ft 7 in (1.7 m)	Sr	Odessa JC	Houston, TX
G	12	Dae Dae Evans	5 ft 7 in (1.7 m)	Sr	Bellaire HS	Bellaire, TX
F/C	13	Alecia Westbrook	6 ft 1 in (1.85 m)	Fr	Park Hill South HS	Kansas City, MO
G	14	Olivia Dowden	5 ft 10 in (1.78 m)	Fr	McCutcheon HS	West Lafayette, IN
G	20	Makinna Serrata	6 ft 0 in (1.83 m)	RS So	McMullen Counts ISD	Tilden, TX
G	21	Emma Young	5 ft 10 in (1.78 m)	Sr	East Jessamine HS	Nicholasville, KY
G	22	Dalesia Booth	5 ft 9 in (1.75 m)	Sr	Cole HS	San Antonio, TX
C	23	Lynn Tamis	6 ft 3 in (1.91 m)	So	Indiana State	Amsterdam Netherlands
F	25	Arhianna Sims-Jackson	6 ft 5 in (1.96 m)	Sr	Hill College	Arlington, TX
G	30	Sydney-Anne Cotrell	5 ft 4 in (1.63 m)	RS Sr	William B. Travis HS	Sugar Land, TX
F	34	Tiara Matthews	5 ft 11 in (1.8 m)	Sr	Fort Bend Kemper HS	Sugar Land, TX

Head coach

- Royce Chadwick (Southwestern Oklahoma State)

Assistant coach(es)

- Roxanne White (Stephen F. Austin)
- Darren Brunson (St. Mary's (TX))
- Sherrie Tucker (Coppin State)

Legend

- (C) Team captain
- (S) Suspended
- (I) Ineligible
- (W) Walk-on
- Injured
- Current redshirt

Roster
Last update: December 22, 2019

== Schedule and results ==
Date time, TV	Rank^{#}	Opponent^{#}	Result	Record	Site (attendance) city, state
Non-conference exhibition season
Nov 1, 2019*; 5:00 pm		St. Edward's	W 61–45		American Bank Center (499); Corpus Christi, TX
Non-conference regular season
Nov 5, 2019*; 7:00 pm		St. Thomas (Texas)	W 75–55	1–0	Dugan Wellness Center (715); Corpus Christi, TX
Nov 8, 2019*; 7:00 pm		at Missouri State; Preseason WNIT First Round	L 51–79	1–1	JQH Arena (1,523); Springfield, MO
Nov 14, 2019*; 7:00 pm		at South Alabama; Preseason WNIT Second Round	L 82–83 ^{OT}	1–2	Mitchell Center (318); Mobile, AL
Nov 15, 2019*; 4:30 pm		vs. Prairie View A&M; Preseason WNIT Third Round	W 64–52	2–2	Mitchell Center (335); Mobile, AL
Nov 23, 2019*; 1:00 pm		Texas–Rio Grande Valley; South Texas Showdown	W 61–50	3–2	Dugan Wellness Center (1,002); Corpus Christi, TX
Nov 26, 2019*; 7:00 pm		Huston–Tillotson	W 63–49	4–2	Dugan Wellness Center (1,128); Corpus Christi, TX
Nov 30, 2019*; 2:00 pm, ESPN+		at Texas State	L 48–57	4–3	Strahan Coliseum; San Marcos, TX
Dec 7, 2019*; 1:00 pm		Texas Wesleyan	W 90–52	5–3	Dugan Wellness Center (977); Corpus Christi, TX
Dec 12, 2019*; 7:00 pm		at Texas–Rio Grande Valley	W 59–54	6–3	UTRGV Fieldhouse (872); Edinburg, TX
Southland regular season
Dec 18, 2019; 7:00 pm		Nicholls	W 55–49	7–3 (1–0)	Dugan Wellness Center (868); Corpus Christi, TX
Dec 21, 2019; 1:00 pm		Central Arkansas	W 67–47	8–3 (2–0)	Dugan Wellness Center (700); Corpus Christi, TX
Non-conference regular season
Dec 29, 2019; 3:00 pm, SECN+		at No. 11 Texas A&M	L 48–85	8–4 (2–0)	Reed Arena (3,804); College Station, TX
Southland regular season
Jan 2, 2020; 3:00 pm, DemonTV		at Northwestern State	W 72–59	9–4 (3–0)	Prather Coliseum (545); Natchitoches, LA
Jan 4, 2020; 1:00 pm		at Southeastern Louisiana	L 44–48	9–5 (3–1)	University Center (433); Hammond, LA
Jan 8, 2020; 7:00 pm		Stephen F. Austin	L 44–66	9–6 (3–2)	Dugan Wellness Center (706); Corpus Christi, TX
Jan 11, 2020; 1:00 pm		at Abilene Christian	W 70–58	10–4 (4–2)	Moody Coliseum (545); Abilene, TX
Jan 18, 2020; 1:00 pm		Lamar	W 49–39	11–4 (5–2)	American Bank Center (1,517); Corpus Christi, TX
Jan 22, 2020; 7:00 pm		at New Orleans	W 83–53	12–6 (6–2)	Lakefront Arena (228); New Orleans, LA
Jan 25, 2020; 2:00 pm		at Incarnate Word	W 64–38	13–6 (7–2)	McDermott Center (181); San Antonio, TX
Jan 29, 2020; 7:00 pm		Sam Houston State	W 57–54	14–6 (8–2)	American Bank Center (1,574); Corpus Christi, TX
Feb 1, 2020; 2:00 pm		at Houston Baptist	W 75–65	15–6 (9–2)	Sharp Gymnasium (205); Houston, TX
Feb 5, 2020; 6:30 pm		at McNeese	W 73–59	16–6 (10–2)	H&HP Complex (2,269); Lake Charles, LA
Feb 12, 2020; 6:30 pm		at Stephen F. Austin	L 49–72	16–7 (10–3)	William R. Johnson Coliseum (932); Nacogdoches, TX
Feb 15, 2020; 1:00 pm		Abilene Christian	W 68–59	17–7 (11–3)	American Bank Center (1,103); Corpus Christi, TX
Feb 19, 2020; 7:00 pm		Southeastern Louisiana	W 49–48	18–7 (12–3)	American Bank Center (1,328); Corpus Christi, TX
Feb 22, 2020; 2:00 pm		at Lamar	W 64–56	19–7 (13–3)	Montagne Center; Beaumont, TX
Feb 26, 2020; 7:00 pm		New Orleans	W 43–40	20–7 (14–3)	American Bank Center (1,835); Corpus Christi, TX
Feb 29, 2020; 1:00 pm		Incarnate Word	W 56–50	21–7 (15–3)	American Bank Center (1,483); Corpus Christi, TX
Mar 4, 2020; 6:30 pm		at Sam Houston State	W 60–45	22–7 (16–3)	Bernard Johnson Coliseum (874); Huntsville, TX
Mar 7, 2020; 6:30 pm		Houston Baptist	W 58–47	23–7 (17–3)	American Bank Center (1,040); Corpus Christi, TX
2020 Hercules Tires Southland Basketball Tournament
March 14, 2020; 1:00 pm, ESPN+		Winner of Game 3 Semifinals	Canceled due to COVID-19 issues		Merrell Center; Katy, TX
*Non-conference game. ^{#}Rankings from AP Poll. (#) Tournament seedings in parentheses. All times are in Central Time.

== See also ==
- 2019–20 Texas A&M–Corpus Christi Islanders men's basketball team
