= 2019–20 Southeastern Louisiana Lady Lions basketball team =

Intercollegiate basketball season

2019–20 Southeastern Louisiana Lady Lions basketball
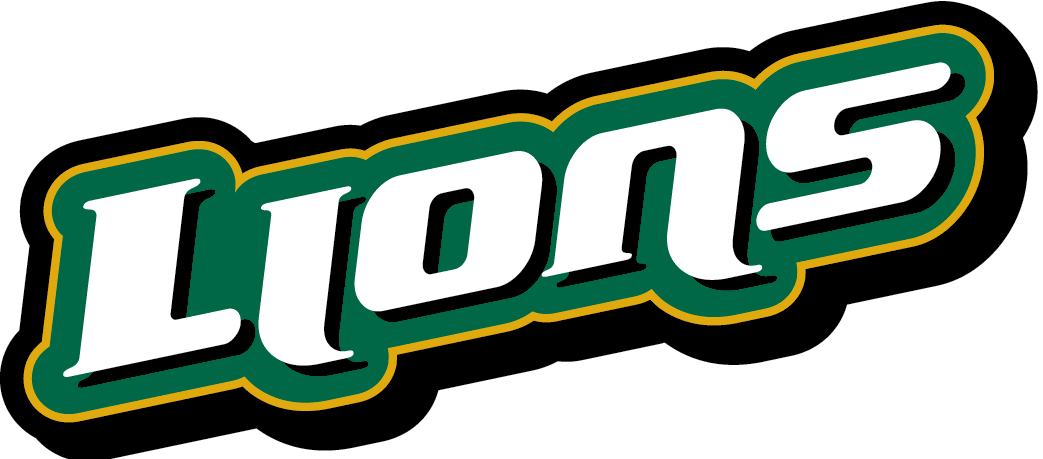
- Conference: Southland Conference
- Record: 12–17 (9–11 Southland)
- Head coach: Ayla Guzzardo (3rd season)
- Assistant coaches: Kenneth Lee, Jr.; Aja Ochie; Chelsie Butler
- Home arena: University Center (Capacity:7,500)

2019–20 Southland Conference women's basketball standings
	Conf.				Overall
Team	W		L	PCT	W		L	PCT
Texas A&M-CC	17	–	3	.850	23	–	7	.767
Abilene Christian	16	–	4	.800	24	–	5	.828
Stephen F. Austin	16	–	4	.800	23	–	6	.793
Sam Houston State	14	–	6	.700	19	–	10	.655
New Orleans	13	–	7	.650	17	–	12	.586
Incarnate Word	10	–	10	.500	14	–	15	.483
Nicholls	10	–	10	.500	13	–	16	.448
Central Arkansas	9	–	11	.450	13	–	16	.448
Southeastern Louisiana	9	–	11	.450	12	–	17	.414
Lamar	6	–	14	.300	10	–	19	.345
Houston Baptist	4	–	16	.200	8	–	21	.276
Northwestern State	4	–	16	.200	7	–	22	.241
McNeese State	2	–	18	.100	5	–	24	.172
† 2020 Southland tournament winner As of March 7, 2020; Rankings from AP poll

The 2019–20 Southeastern Louisiana Lady Lions basketball team represented Southeastern Louisiana University during the 2019–20 NCAA Division I women's basketball season. The Lady Lions were led by third-year head coach Ayla Guzzardo, and played their home games at the University Center as members of the Southland Conference.

== Previous season ==
The Lady Lions finished the season 9–20, 4–14 in Southland play to finish in a tie for last place. They failed to qualify for the Southland women's tournament.

== Roster ==
2019–20 Southeastern Louisiana Lions women's basketball team
Players
Coaches

Pos.	#	Name	Height	Year	Previous school	Hometown
G/F	3	Morgan Carrier	5 ft 9 in (1.75 m)	Jr	New Iberia Central HS	New Iberia, LA
G	5	Charliee Dugas	5 ft 8 in (1.73 m)	Sr	Rayne HS	Rayne, LA
G	10	Jaylen Huderson	5 ft 7 in (1.7 m)	Fr	Salmen HS	Slidell, LA
F	12	Jyar Francis	6 ft 1 in (1.85 m)	Sr	Ponchatoula HS; Wichita State	Ponchatoula, LA
G	15	Diaja Harvey	5 ft 9 in (1.75 m)	Fr	Donaldsonville HS	Donaldsonville, LA
G	20	Celica Sterling	5 ft 8 in (1.73 m)	Sr	Scotlandville HS; Baton Rouge CC	Baton Rouge, LA
G	23	Breonca Ducksworth	5 ft 4 in (1.63 m)	Jr	West Jones HS; Jones County JC	Taylorsville, MS
G	24	Tyler Morrison	5 ft 8 in (1.73 m)	Sr	St. Michael HS	Baton Rouge, LA
F	25	Caitlyn Williams	6 ft 0 in (1.83 m)	Jr	Brusly HS	Brusly, LA
G	31	Alexius Horne	5 ft 9 in (1.75 m)	Fr	Denham Springs HS	Baton Rouge, LA
C	32	Bren'naisa Adams	6 ft 3 in (1.91 m)	Fr	Thibodaux HS	Thibodaux, LA
C	33	Aminat Jubril	6 ft 2 in (1.88 m)	Sr	New Era Girls Secondary School; Pensacola State College	Lagos, Nigeria
G	55	Hailey Giaratano	5 ft 10 in (1.78 m)	Fr	Ponchatoula HS	Ponchatoula, LA

Head coach

- Ayla Guzzardo (Akron)

Assistant coach(es)

- Kenneth Lee, Jr. (Nicholls State)
- Aja Ochie (Southeastern Louisiana)
- Chelsie Butler (Marquette)

Legend

- (C) Team captain
- (S) Suspended
- (I) Ineligible
- (W) Walk-on
- Injured
- Current redshirt

Roster
Last update: December 22, 2019

== Schedule ==
Date time, TV	Rank^{#}	Opponent^{#}	Result	Record	Site (attendance) city, state
Exhibition season
Nov 4, 2019*		Southern University (New Orleans)	W 103–47		University Center; Hammond, LA
Non-conference regular season
Nov 9, 2019*; 1:00 pm		at Houston	L 65–78	0–1	Fertitta Center; Houston, TX
Nov 13, 2019*; 6:00 pm		at Southern Miss	L 54–62	0–2	Reed Green Coliseum (711); Hattiesburg, MS
Nov 17, 2019; 4:00 pm, ESPN+		at Louisiana	L 50–60	0–3	CajunDome (831); Lafayette, LA
Nov 20, 2019*; 6:30 pm, SECN+		at LSU	W 65–52	0–4	Pete Maravich Assembly Center (823); Baton Rouge, LA
Nov 24, 2019*; 2:00 pm, ESPN+		at Louisiana–Monroe	W 65–52	1–4	Fant–Ewing Coliseum (781); Monroe, LA
Nov 27, 2019*; 1:00 pm		LSU–Alexandria	W 89–67	2–4	University Center (474); Hammond, LA
Dec 7, 2019*; 1:00 pm		Jackson State	W 63–59	3–4	University Center (371); Hammond, LA
Dec 13, 2019*; 6:30 pm		at Louisiana Tech	L 78–92	3–5	Thomas Assembly Center (1,586); Ruston, LA
Southland Conference regular season
Dec 18, 2019; 7:00 pm		Lamar	L 57–65	3–6 (0–1)	University Center (433); Hammond, LA
Dec 21, 2019; 2:00 pm		at Houston Baptist	W 69–59	4–6 (1–1)	Sharp Gymnasium (87); Houston, TX
Non-conference regular season
Dec 29, 2019; 2:00 pm, SECN+		at Alabama	L 50–87	4–7	Coleman Coliseum (1,973); Tuscaloosa, AL
Southland Conference regular season
Jan 2, 2020; 6:30 pm, ESPN3		at Stephen F. Austin	L 51–77	4–8 (1–2)	William R. Johnson Coliseum (634); Nacogdoches, TX
Jan 4, 2020; 1:00 pm		Texas A&M–Corpus Christi	W 48–44	5–8 (2–2)	University Center (433); Hammond, LA
Jan 8, 2020; 7:00 pm		Sam Houston State	L 69–84	5–9 (2–3)	University Center (454); Hammond, LA
Jan 11, 2020; 1:00 pm		Nicholls	L 65–67	5–10 (2–4)	University Center (549); Hammond, LA
Jan 18, 2020; 4:30 pm, ESPN+		at Abilene Christian	L 53–61	5–11 (2–5)	Moody Coliseum (733); Abilene, TX
Jan 22, 2020; 6:30 pm		at McNeese State	W 74–67	6–11 (3–5)	H&HP Complex (2,139); Lake Charles, LA
Jan 25, 2020; 1:00 pm, ESPN3		at Northwestern State	W 72–56	7–11 (4–5)	Prather Coliseum (786); Natchitoches, LA
Jan 29, 2020; 1:00 pm		Central Arkansas	W 63–42	8–11 (5–5)	University Center (592); Hammond, LA
Feb 1, 2020; 1:00 pm		New Orleans	W 73–57	9–11 (6–5)	University Center (548); Hammond, LA
Feb 8, 2020; 1:00 pm		Incarnate Word	W 58–44	10–11 (7–5)	University Center (829); Hammond, LA
Feb 12, 2020; 6:30 pm, ESPN+		at Sam Houston State	L 75–81	10–12 (7–6)	Bernard Johnson Coliseum (646); Huntsville, TX
Feb 15, 2020; 1:00 pm, ESPN3		at Nicholls	L 49–54	10–13 (7–7)	Stopher Gymnasium (287); Thibodaux, LA
Feb 19, 2020; 7:00 pm		at Texas A&M–Corpus Christi	L 48–49	10–14 (7–8)	American Bank Center (1,328); Corpus Christi, TX
Feb 22, 2020; 1:00 pm		Abilene Christian	L 62–68	10–15 (7–9)	University Center (753); Hammond, LA
Feb 26, 2020; 7:00 pm		McNeese State	W 87–48	11–15 (8–9)	University Center (593); Hammond, LA
Feb 29, 2020; 1:00 pm		Northwestern State	W 66–41	12–15 (9–9)	University Center (603); Hammond, LA
Mar 4, 2020; 7:00 pm		at Central Arkansas	L 47–54	12–16 (9–10)	Farris Center (86); Conway, AR
Mar 7, 2020; 4:00 pm		at New Orleans	L 47–58	12–17 (9–11)	Lakefront Arena (547); New Orleans, LA
2020 Hercules Tires Southland Basketball Tournament
March 12, 2020; 11:00 am, ESPN+		New Orleans; First Round	Canceled due to COVID-19 issues		Merrell Center; Katy, TX
*Non-conference game. ^{#}Rankings from AP Poll. (#) Tournament seedings in parentheses. All times are in Central Time.

== See also ==
- 2019–20 Southeastern Louisiana Lions basketball team
