= 2019–20 Sam Houston State Bearkats women's basketball team =

Intercollegiate basketball season

2019–20 Sam Houston State Bearkats women's basketball
- Conference: Southland Conference
- Record: 19–10 (14–6 Southland)
- Head coach: Ravon Justice (2nd season)
- Assistant coaches: Raru Archer; Kira Carter; Brittany Mason
- Home arena: Bernard Johnson Coliseum (Capacity: 6,100)

2019–20 Southland Conference women's basketball standings
	Conf.				Overall
Team	W		L	PCT	W		L	PCT
Texas A&M-CC	17	–	3	.850	23	–	7	.767
Abilene Christian	16	–	4	.800	24	–	5	.828
Stephen F. Austin	16	–	4	.800	23	–	6	.793
Sam Houston State	14	–	6	.700	19	–	10	.655
New Orleans	13	–	7	.650	17	–	12	.586
Incarnate Word	10	–	10	.500	14	–	15	.483
Nicholls	10	–	10	.500	13	–	16	.448
Central Arkansas	9	–	11	.450	13	–	16	.448
Southeastern Louisiana	9	–	11	.450	12	–	17	.414
Lamar	6	–	14	.300	10	–	19	.345
Houston Baptist	4	–	16	.200	8	–	21	.276
Northwestern State	4	–	16	.200	7	–	22	.241
McNeese State	2	–	18	.100	5	–	24	.172
† 2020 Southland tournament winner As of March 7, 2020; Rankings from AP poll

The 2019–20 Sam Houston State Bearkats women's basketball team represented Sam Houston State University during the 2019–20 NCAA Division I women's basketball season. The Bearkats, led by second-year head coach Ravon Justice, played their home games at the Bernard Johnson Coliseum in Huntsville, Texas as members of the Southland Conference. They finished the season 19–10, 14–6 in Southland play, to finish in fourth place. Before they could play in the Southland women's tournament; however, the tournament was cancelled due to the coronavirus pandemic.

== Previous season ==
The Bearkats finished the 2018–19 season 16–13 overall, 11–7 in Southland play, to finish in fifth place. As the No. 5 seed in the Southland women's tournament, they were defeated in the first round by Central Arkansas.

== Roster ==
2019–20 Sam Houston State Bearkats women's basketball team
Players
Coaches

Pos.	#	Name	Height	Year	Previous school	Hometown
G	0	Sydnee Kemp	5 ft 5 in (1.65 m)	Fr	Lee's Summit West HS	Kansas City, MO
G	1	Jennifer Oramas	5 ft 5 in (1.65 m)	Sr	Charles W. Flannigan HS	Pembroke Pines, FL
F	2	Amber Leggett	5 ft 11 in (1.8 m)	So	Choctawhatchee HS	Navarre, FL
G	3	Alyssa Osborne	5 ft 6 in (1.68 m)	Jr	Oakridge HS	Spring, TX
F	5	Sandra Cannady	6 ft 0 in (1.83 m)	Fr	College Park HS	The Woodlands, TX
F	10	Faith Cook	6 ft 0 in (1.83 m)	Jr	Goose Creek HS; UTEP	Baytown, TX
F	11	Courtney Cleveland	5 ft 10 in (1.78 m)	Jr	Arlington HS; Pratt CC	Arlington, TX
G/F	12	Taryn Archie	5 ft 8 in (1.73 m)	Jr	Huntsville HS; Blinn College	Huntsville, TX
G	13	Kaylee Jefferson	6 ft 0 in (1.83 m)	So	Sulphur Springs HS; East Carolina	Sulphur Springs, TX
G	15	Tia Harston	5 ft 2 in (1.57 m)	Sr	Killeen HS	Killeen, TX
F	20	La'Sha Haynes	5 ft 10 in (1.78 m)	RS Sr	Port Gibson HS; Prairie View A&M	New Orleans, LA
F	21	Madelyn Batista	6 ft 2 in (1.88 m)	So	Winter Park HS; Daytona State CC	Orlando, FL
G	23	Jaylonn Walker	5 ft 7 in (1.7 m)	Sr	Calvert HS/McClennan CC	Calvert, TX
G	24	Rahmena Henderson	5 ft 8 in (1.73 m)	Fr	St. John Vianney HS	Neptune, NJ
F	25	Alyvia Essex	5 ft 11 in (1.8 m)	Jr	Atlantic City HS; Rowan College at Gloucester County	Atlantic City, NJ
G	34	Rachell Harrell	5 ft 9 in (1.75 m)	Sr	Brock HS	Weatherford, TX
F	42	Kiera McKinney	6 ft 2 in (1.88 m)	Sr	Tascosa HS	Amarillo, TX

Head coach

- Ravon Justice (USAO)

Assistant coach(es)

- Raru Archer (Texas Southern)
- Kira Carter (Coastal Carolina)
- Brittany Mason (Houston)

Legend

- (C) Team captain
- (S) Suspended
- (I) Ineligible
- (W) Walk-on
- Injured
- Current redshirt

Roster
Last update: August 17, 2024

== Schedule ==
Date time, TV	Rank^{#}	Opponent^{#}	Result	Record	Site (attendance) city, state
Non-conference games
November 6, 2019*; 6:30 p.m., ESPN3		at Howard Payne	W 91–49	1–0	Bernard Johnson Coliseum (707); Huntsville, TX
November 10, 2019*; 3:00 p.m., ESPN3		Louisiana	W 77–73	2–0	Bernard Johnson Coliseum (529); Huntsville, TX
November 14, 2019*; 6:00 p.m., FSSW		at Texas Tech	L 57–99	2–1	United Supermarkets Arena (4,078); Lubbock, TX
November 26, 2019*; 6:00 p.m., SECN+		at Ole Miss	L 69–75	2–2	The Pavilion at Ole Miss (1,320); Oxford, MS
November 30, 2019*; 2:00 p.m.		at Oral Roberts	L 41–64	2–3	Mabee Center; Tulsa, OK
December 3, 2019*; 4:00 p.m., ESPN3		Jarvis Christian	W 114–46	3–3	Bernard Johnson Coliseum; Huntsville, TX
December 8, 2019*; 2:00 p.m.		UTSA	W 81–77	4–3	Convocation Center; San Antonio, TX
December 15, 2019*; 2:00 p.m.		at Oklahoma	L 71–95	4–4	Lloyd Noble Center (1,445); Norman, OK
Southland Conference regular season
December 18, 2019; 3:00 p.m.		at Northwestern State	W 79–69	5–4 (1–0)	Prather Coliseum (546); Natchitoches, LA
December 21, 2019; 2:00 p.m.		at New Orleans	W 78–46	6–4 (2–0)	Lakefront Arena (221); New Orleans, LA
Non-conference games
December 30, 2019*; 6:30 p.m.		Wiley (Texas)	W 102–52	7–4	Bernard Johnson Coliseum (490); Huntsville, TX
Southland Conference regular season
January 2, 2020; 6:30 p.m.		McNeese State	W 92–59	8–4 (3–0)	Bernard Johnson Coliseum (473); Huntsville, TX
January 4, 2020; 3:00 p.m.		Nicholls	W 87–71	9–4 (4–0)	Bernard Johnson Coliseum (549); Huntsville, TX
January 8, 2020; 7:00 p.m.		at Southeastern Louisiana	W 84–69	10–4 (5–0)	University Center (454); Hammond, LA
January 11, 2020; 1:00 p.m.		at Central Arkansas	W 72–54	11–4 (6–0)	Farris Center (572); Conway, AR
January 15, 2020; 6:30 p.m., ESPN+		Lamar	W 68–47	12–4 (7–0)	Bernard Johnson Coliseum (751); Huntsville, TX
January 18, 2020; 2:00 p.m.		at Houston Baptist	W 97–69	13–4 (8–0)	Sharp Gymnasium (434); Houston, TX
January 22, 2020; 5:00 p.m., ESPN+		Abilene Christian	L 73–81	13–5 (8–1)	Bernard Johnson Coliseum (665); Huntsville, TX
January 29, 2020; 7:00 p.m.		at Texas A&M–Corpus Christi	L 54–57	13–6 (8–2)	American Bank Center (1,574); Corpus Christi, TX
February 1, 2020; 3:00 p.m., ESPN3		Stephen F. Austin	W 63–55	14–6 (9–2)	Bernard Johnson Coliseum (1,286); Huntsville, TX
February 5, 2020; 6:30 p.m., ESPN3		Incarnate Word	L 74–77	14–7 (9–3)	Bernard Johnson Coliseum (599); Huntsville, TX
February 8, 2020; 1:00 p.m.		at Nicholls	W 80–77	15–7 (10–3)	Stopher Gymnasium (277); Thibodaux, LA
February 12, 2020; 6:30 p.m., ESPN+		Southeastern Louisiana	W 81–75	16–7 (11–3)	Bernard Johnson Coliseum (646); Huntsville, TX
February 15, 2020; 1:00 p.m., ESPN3		Central Arkansas	W 73–58	17–7 (12–3)	Bernard Johnson Coliseum (350); Huntsville, TX
February 19, 2020; 7:00 p.m., ESPN+		at Lamar	W 75–68	18–7 (13–3)	Montagne Center (741); Beaumont, TX
February 22, 2020; 3:00 p.m., ESPN3		Houston Baptist	W 75–60	19–7 (14–3)	Bernard Johnson Coliseum; Huntsville, TX
February 26, 2020; 5:30 p.m., ESPN+		at Abilene Christian	L 91–94	19–8 (14–4)	Moody Coliseum; Abilene, TX
March 4, 2020; 6:30 p.m., ESPN+		Texas A&M–Corpus Christi	L 45–60	19–9 (14–5)	Bernard Johnson Coliseum (874); Huntsville, TX
March 7, 2020; 2:00 p.m., ESPN+		at Stephen F. Austin	L 54–60	19–10 (14–6)	William R. Johnson Coliseum (2,431); Nacogdoches, TX
2020 Hercules Tires Southland basketball tournament
March 13, 2020; 11:00 a.m., ESPN+		New Orleans or Southeastern Louisiana; Second round	Canceled due to the COVID-19 pandemic		Merrell Center; Katy, TX
*Non-conference game. ^{#}Rankings from AP poll. (#) Tournament seedings in parentheses. All times are in Central.

== See also ==
- 2019–20 Sam Houston State Bearkats men's basketball team
