= 2019–20 Abilene Christian Wildcats women's basketball team =

Intercollegiate basketball season

2019–20 Abilene Christian Wildcats women's basketball
- Conference: Southland Conference
- Record: 24–5 (16–4 Southland)
- Head coach: Julie Goodenough (8th season)
- Assistant coaches: Erika Lambert; Erik Deroo; Drew Cole
- Home arena: Moody Coliseum

2019–20 Southland Conference women's basketball standings
	Conf.				Overall
Team	W		L	PCT	W		L	PCT
Texas A&M-CC	17	–	3	.850	23	–	7	.767
Abilene Christian	16	–	4	.800	24	–	5	.828
Stephen F. Austin	16	–	4	.800	23	–	6	.793
Sam Houston State	14	–	6	.700	19	–	10	.655
New Orleans	13	–	7	.650	17	–	12	.586
Incarnate Word	10	–	10	.500	14	–	15	.483
Nicholls	10	–	10	.500	13	–	16	.448
Central Arkansas	9	–	11	.450	13	–	16	.448
Southeastern Louisiana	9	–	11	.450	12	–	17	.414
Lamar	6	–	14	.300	10	–	19	.345
Houston Baptist	4	–	16	.200	8	–	21	.276
Northwestern State	4	–	16	.200	7	–	22	.241
McNeese State	2	–	18	.100	5	–	24	.172
† 2020 Southland tournament winner As of March 7, 2020; Rankings from AP poll

The 2019–20 Abilene Christian Wildcats women's basketball team represented Abilene Christian University during the 2019–20 NCAA Division I women's basketball season. The Wildcats, led by eighth-year head coach Julie Goodenough, played their home games at the Moody Coliseum in Abilene, Texas as members of the Southland Conference.

They finished the season 24–5, 16–4 in Southland play, to finish in second place. Before they could play in the Southland women's tournament, however, the tournament was cancelled due to the coronavirus pandemic.

== Previous season ==
The Wildcats finished the 2018–19 season 23–10, 13–5 in Southland play, to finish in fourth place. They won the Southland women's tournament to earn an automatic bid to the NCAA women's tournament for the first time in school history. They lost in the tournament's first round to Baylor.

== Roster ==
2019–20 Abilene Christian Wildcats women's basketball team
Players
Coaches

Pos.	#	Name	Height	Year	Previous school	Hometown
G	0	Kamryn Mraz	5 ft 6 in (1.68 m)	So	Academy HS	Little River, TX
G	3	Dominique Golightly	5 ft 11 in (1.8 m)	Sr	Chickasha HS	Chickasha, OK
G	10	Breanna Wright	5 ft 8 in (1.73 m)	Sr	Jarell HS	Jarrell, TX
G	12	Josie Larson	5 ft 9 in (1.75 m)	Jr	Johnson HS	San Antonio, TX
G	14	Pamela Herrara	5 ft 6 in (1.68 m)	Sr	Bel Air HS	El Paso, TX
F	24	Diamond Wilcott	5 ft 11 in (1.8 m)	So	South Grand Prairie HS	Cedar Hill, TX
C	25	Lexi Kirgan	6 ft 4 in (1.93 m)	Sr	Bullard HS	Bullard, TX
G/F	30	Anna McLeod	6 ft 0 in (1.83 m)	Jr	Home School; Louisiana Tech	Houston, TX
G	31	Madi Miller	5 ft 9 in (1.75 m)	So	Wylie HS	Wylie, TX
F/C	32	Makayla Mabry	6 ft 1 in (1.85 m)	Jr	Incarnate Word HS	San Antonio, TX
F	33	Alyssa Adams	6 ft 1 in (1.85 m)	Jr	Johnson HS	San Antonio, TX
F	44	Lexie Ducat	6 ft 1 in (1.85 m)	Sr	Brock HS; Rice	Brock, TX

Head coach

- Julie Goodenough (Abilene Christian)

Assistant coach(es)

- Erika Lambert (College of Charleston)
- Erik DeRoo (Fresno State)
- Drew Cole (Aurora)

Legend

- (C) Team captain
- (S) Suspended
- (I) Ineligible
- (W) Walk-on
- Injured
- Current redshirt

Roster
Last update: December 21, 2019

== Schedule ==
Date time, TV	Rank^{#}	Opponent^{#}	Result	Record	Site (attendance) city, state
Non-conference regular season
November 5, 2019*; 5:30 p.m.		McMurry	W 111–43	1–0	Moody Coliseum (743); Abilene, TX
November 7, 2019*; 11:00 a.m.		Southwest (New Mexico)	W 104–52	2–0	Moody Coliseum (4,524); Abilene, TX
November 15, 2019*; 6:00 p.m.		at Wright State	W 83–64	3–0	Nutter Center (384); Dayton, OH
November 19, 2019*; 5:30 p.m.		Howard Payne	W 96–38	4–0	Moody Coliseum (1,082); Abilene, TX
November 26, 2019*; 7:00 p.m.		at Oklahoma	L 65–78	4–1	Lloyd Noble Center (2,115); Norman, OK
November 24, 2018*; 7:00 p.m.		at Portland	W 76–69	5–1	Chiles Center (327); Portland, OR
December 5, 2019*; 5:30 p.m.		Tulsa	W 73–63	6–1	Moody Coliseum (1,242); Abilene, TX
December 14, 2019*; 1:00 p.m.		Schreiner	W 110–37	7–1	Moody Coliseum (365); Abilene, TX
Southland regular season
December 18, 2019; 5:30 p.m., ESPN3		New Orleans	W 76–62	8–1 (1–0)	Moody Coliseum (388); Abilene, TX
December 21, 2019; 1:00 p.m.		at Nicholls	W 95–84 ^{OT}	9–1 (2–0)	Stopher Gymnasium (201); Thibodaux, LA
Non-conference regular season
December 28, 2019; 12:00 p.m.		New Mexico State	W 67–54	10–1	Moody Coliseum (328); Abilene, TX
Southland regular season
January 4, 2020; 1:00 p.m., ESPN3		Lamar	W 78–72	11–1 (3–0)	Moody Coliseum (481); Abilene, TX
January 8, 2020; 6:30 p.m.		at McNeese State	W 90–73	12–1 (4–0)	H&HP Complex (2,107); Lake Charles, LA
January 11, 2020; 1:00 p.m., ESPN3		Texas A&M–Corpus Christi	L 58–70	12–2 (4–1)	Moody Coliseum (545); Abilene, TX
January 18, 2020; 4:30 p.m., ESPN+		Southeastern Louisiana	W 61–53	13–2 (5–1)	Moody Coliseum (733); Abilene, TX
January 22, 2020; 5:00 p.m., ESPN+		at Sam Houston State	W 81–73	14–2 (6–1)	Bernard Johnson Coliseum (665); Huntsville, TX
January 25, 2020; 1:00 p.m., ESPN+		at Central Arkansas	W 74–64	15–2 (7–1)	Farris Center (685); Conway, AR
January 29, 2020; 5:00 p.m., ESPN+		at Stephen F. Austin	L 59–69	15–3 (7–2)	William R. Johnson Coliseum (1,561); Nacogdoches, TX
February 1, 2020; 4:30 p.m.		Incarnate Word	L 70–71	15–4 (7–3)	Moody Coliseum (732); Abilene, TX
February 5, 2020; 5:30 p.m.		Northwestern State	W 84–69	16–4 (8–3)	Moody Coliseum (482); Abilene, TX
February 8, 2020; 2:00 p.m., ESPN3		at Lamar	W 75–49	17–4 (9–3)	Montagne Center (816); Beaumont, TX
February 12, 2010; 5:30 p.m.		Houston Baptist	W 71–54	18–4 (10–3)	Moody Coliseum (649); Abilene, TX
February 15, 2020; 1:00 p.m.		at Texas A&M–Corpus Christi	L 59–68	18–5 (10–4)	American Bank Center (1,103); Corpus Christi, TX
February 19, 2020; 5:00 p.m.		at Houston Baptist	W 84–79	19–5 (11–4)	Sharp Gymnasium (159); Houston, TX
February 22, 2020; 1:00 p.m.		at Southeastern Louisiana	W 68–62	20–5 (12–4)	University Center (753); Hammond, LA
February 26, 2020; 5:30 p.m., ESPN+		Sam Houston State	W 94–91	21–5 (13–4)	Moody Coliseum (559); Abilene, TX
February 29, 2020; 1:00 p.m., ESPN+		Central Arkansas	W 93–71	22–5 (14–4)	Moody Coliseum (1,011); Abilene, TX
March 3, 2020; 5:30 p.m., ESPN+		Stephen F. Austin	W 88–62	23–5 (15–4)	Moody Coliseum (903); Abilene, TX
March 7, 2020; 2:00 p.m.		at Incarnate Word	W 76–69 ^{OT}	24–5 (16–4)	McDermott Center (498); San Antonio, TX
2020 Hercules TiresSouthland Basketball Tournament
March 13, 2020; 1:30 p.m., ESPN+		Nicholls or Incarnate Word; Second round	Canceled due to the COVID-19 pandemic		Merrell Center; Katy, TX
*Non-conference game. ^{#}Rankings from AP poll. (#) Tournament seedings in parentheses. C=Chicago Region. All times are in Central.

== See also ==
- 2019–20 Abilene Christian Wildcats men's basketball team
