= 2019–20 Northwestern State Lady Demons basketball team =

Intercollegiate basketball season

2019–20 Northwestern State Lady Demons basketball
- Conference: Southland Conference
- Record: 7–22 (4–16 Southland)
- Head coach: Jordan Dupuy (4th season, resigned Jan. 26, 2020); Aaron Swinson (interim)
- Assistant coaches: Aaron Swinson (until Jan. 26, 2020); Nicolle Mitchell; Sarah Miles
- Home arena: Prather Coliseum (Capacity: 3,900)

2019–20 Southland Conference women's basketball standings
	Conf.				Overall
Team	W		L	PCT	W		L	PCT
Texas A&M-CC	17	–	3	.850	23	–	7	.767
Abilene Christian	16	–	4	.800	24	–	5	.828
Stephen F. Austin	16	–	4	.800	23	–	6	.793
Sam Houston State	14	–	6	.700	19	–	10	.655
New Orleans	13	–	7	.650	17	–	12	.586
Incarnate Word	10	–	10	.500	14	–	15	.483
Nicholls	10	–	10	.500	13	–	16	.448
Central Arkansas	9	–	11	.450	13	–	16	.448
Southeastern Louisiana	9	–	11	.450	12	–	17	.414
Lamar	6	–	14	.300	10	–	19	.345
Houston Baptist	4	–	16	.200	8	–	21	.276
Northwestern State	4	–	16	.200	7	–	22	.241
McNeese State	2	–	18	.100	5	–	24	.172
† 2020 Southland tournament winner As of March 7, 2020; Rankings from AP poll

The 2019–20 Northwestern State Lady Demons basketball team represented Northwestern State University during the 2019–20 NCAA Division I women's basketball season. The Demons, led by interim head coach Aaron Swinson, who took over for Jordan Dupuy following the latter's resignation on January 26, 2020, played their home games at Prather Coliseum in Natchitoches, Louisiana and were members of the Southland Conference.

== Previous season ==
The Lady Demons finished the 2018–19 season 11–18, 6–12 in Southland play, to finish in eighth place. Due to a tiebreaker loss to New Orleans they failed to qualify for the Southland women's tournament.

== Roster ==
2019–20 Northwestern State Demons women's basketball team
Players
Coaches

Pos.	#	Name	Height	Year	Previous school	Hometown
F	0	Anessa Dussette	5 ft 10 in (1.78 m)	Fr	Manvel HS	Houston, TX
G	1	Gabby Bell	5 ft 4 in (1.63 m)	Sr	Martin HS	Arlington, TX
G	2	Tristen Washington	5 ft 6 in (1.68 m)	Fr	East Ascension HS	Gonzales, LA
G	3	Kalen Green	5 ft 6 in (1.68 m)	Jr	North Forney HS; Seward County CC	Forney, TX
F	4	Lacee Savage	6 ft 0 in (1.83 m)	Jr	Clear Creek HS	Houston, TX
F	5	Julia Sion	6 ft 1 in (1.85 m)	Fr	Memorial HS	Port Arthur, TX
F	11	Leilani Moncrease	6 ft 0 in (1.83 m)	Jr	Moreau Catholic HS; Diablo Valley CC	Oakland, CA
F	13	Victoria Miller	6 ft 0 in (1.83 m)	Sr	Hebron HS	Carrollton, TX
G	14	Nakaylis Washington	5 ft 9 in (1.75 m)	Jr	South Pike HS; Hinds CC	Magnolia, MS
F	15	Jasmyn Johnson	5 ft 8 in (1.73 m)	Sr	West Monroe HS	West Monroe, LA
F	22	Karyn Ford	5 ft 10 in (1.78 m)	Fr	Yes Prep Gulfton HS	Pearland, TX
F	23	Joycelyn Scott	5 ft 11 in (1.8 m)	Sr	McKinney North HS	McKinney, TX
G	24	Kira Bonner	5 ft 7 in (1.7 m)	Sr	Quitman HS; Jones County JC	Vossburg, MS
F/C		Halei Gillis	6 ft 4 in (1.93 m)	Jr	Carolina Day School; Fordham	Asheville, NC
G		Nia Randall	5 ft 7 in (1.7 m)	RS Jr	Garland HS	Garland, TX

Head coach

- Jordan Dupuy (Southern Miss)

Assistant coach(es)

- Aaron Swinson (Auburn)
- Nicole Mitchell (Christopher Newport University)
- Sarah Miles (West Virginia)

Legend

- (C) Team captain
- (S) Suspended
- (I) Ineligible
- (W) Walk-on
- Injured
- Current redshirt

Roster
Last update: December 23, 2019

== Schedule ==
Date time, TV	Rank^{#}	Opponent^{#}	Result	Record	Site (attendance) city, state
Non-conference regular season
November 5, 2019*; 7:30 p.m., Demon TV		LeTourneau	W 91–61	1–0	Prather Coliseum (1,123); Natchitoches, LA
November 8, 2019*; 6:30 p.m.		Central Baptist	W 61–59	2–0	Prather Coliseum (702); Natchitoches, LA
November 13, 2019*; 6:30 p.m.		Jackson State	L 49–66	2–1	Prather Coliseum (710); Natchitoches, LA
November 18, 2019*; 6:00 p.m., ESPN+		at Louisiana–Monroe	L 54–63	2–2	Fant–Ewing Coliseum (798); Monroe, LA
November 22, 2019*; 7:00 p.m.		at Texas Tech	L 49–79	2–3	United Supermarkets Arena (2,857); Lubbock, TX
November 27, 2019*; 6:30 p.m.		LSU–Shreveport	L 63–68	2–4	Prather Coliseum (532); Natchitoches, LA
December 4, 2019*; 6:30 p.m.		Grambling	W 65–61	3–4	Prather Coliseum (625); Natchitoches, LA
December 15, 2019*; 2:00 p.m., SECN+		at No. 21 Arkansas	L 39–99	3–5	Bud Walton Arena (2,945); Fayetteville, AR
Southland Conference regular season
December 18, 2019; 3:00 p.m.		Sam Houston State	L 69–79	3–6 (0–1)	Prather Coliseum (546); Natchitoches, LA
December 21, 2019; 2:00 p.m., ESPN3		at Lamar	L 58–61	3–7 (0–2)	Montagne Center (801); Beaumont, TX
Non-conference regular season
December 29, 2019; 1:00 p.m., LHN		at No. 25 Texas	L 49–91	3–8	Frank Erwin Center (2,999); Austin, TX
Southland Conference regular season
January 2, 2020; 3:00 p.m., DemonTV		Texas A&M–Corpus Christi	L 59–72	3–9 (0–3)	Prather Coliseum (545); Natchitoches, LA
January 5, 2020; 2:00 p.m., DemonTV		Houston Baptist	W 69–60	4–9 (1–3)	Prather Coliseum (545); Natchitoches, LA
January 8, 2020; 6:30 p.m.		Incarnate Word	L 67–69	4–10 (1–4)	Prather Coliseum (547); Natchitoches, LA
January 11, 2020; 1:00 p.m.		at McNeese State	L 51–61	4–11 (1–5)	H&HP Complex (2,739); Lake Charles, LA
January 15, 2020; 6:30 p.m.		Nicholls	W 58–54	5–11 (2–5)	Prather Coliseum (602); Natchitoches, LA
January 22, 2020; 6:30 p.m., ESPN3		at Stephen F. Austin	L 40–89	5–12 (2–6)	William R. Johnson Coliseum (1,013); Nacogdoches, TX
January 25, 2020; 1:00 p.m., ESPN3		Southeastern Louisiana	L 56–72	5–13 (2–7)	Prather Coliseum (786); Natchitoches, LA
January 29, 2020; 6:30 p.m.		New Orleans	L 63–77	5–14 (2–8)	Prather Coliseum (815); Natchitoches, LA
February 1, 2020; 1:00 p.m.		Central Arkansas	L 44–51	5–15 (2–9)	Prather Coliseum (554); Natchitoches, LA
February 5, 2020; 5:30 p.m., ESPN+		at Abilene Chrisitan	L 69–84	5–16 (2–10)	Moody Coliseum (482); Abilene, TX
February 8, 2020; 2:00 p.m.		at Houston Baptist	W 54–46	6–16 (3–10)	Sharp Gymnasium (374); Houston, TX
February 12, 2020; 6:30 p.m.		at Incarnate Word	L 39–76	6–17 (3–11)	McDermott Center (371); San Antonio, TX
February 15, 2020; 1:00 p.m.		McNeese State	W 70–60	7–17 (4–11)	Prather Coliseum (839); Natchitoches, LA
February 19, 2020; 6:00 p.m.		at Nicholls	L 66–73	7–18 (4–12)	Stopher Gymnasium (211); Thibodaux, LA
February 26, 2020; 6:30 p.m.		Stephen F. Austin	L 45–61	7–19 (4–13)	Prather Coliseum (601); Natchitoches, LA
February 29, 2020; 1:00 p.m.		at Southeastern Louisiana	L 41–66	7–20 (4–14)	University Center (603); Hammond, LA
March 4, 2020; 7:00 p.m.		at New Orleans	L 76–82	7–21 (4–15)	Lakefront Arena (258); New Orleans, LA
March 7, 2020; 1:00 p.m.		at Central Arkansas	L 62–80	7–22 (4–16)	Farris Center (613); Conway, AR
*Non-conference game. ^{#}Rankings from AP poll. (#) Tournament seedings in parentheses. All times are in Central.

== See also ==
- 2019–20 Northwestern State Demons basketball team
