= 2019–20 New Orleans Privateers women's basketball team =

Intercollegiate basketball season

2019–20 New Orleans Privateers women's basketball
- Conference: Southland Conference
- Record: 17–12 (13–7 Southland)
- Head coach: Keeshawn Davenport (9th season)
- Assistant coaches: Wyketha Harrell; Alpha English; Kristin Moore
- Home arena: Lakefront Arena

2019–20 Southland Conference women's basketball standings
	Conf.				Overall
Team	W		L	PCT	W		L	PCT
Texas A&M-CC	17	–	3	.850	23	–	7	.767
Abilene Christian	16	–	4	.800	24	–	5	.828
Stephen F. Austin	16	–	4	.800	23	–	6	.793
Sam Houston State	14	–	6	.700	19	–	10	.655
New Orleans	13	–	7	.650	17	–	12	.586
Incarnate Word	10	–	10	.500	14	–	15	.483
Nicholls	10	–	10	.500	13	–	16	.448
Central Arkansas	9	–	11	.450	13	–	16	.448
Southeastern Louisiana	9	–	11	.450	12	–	17	.414
Lamar	6	–	14	.300	10	–	19	.345
Houston Baptist	4	–	16	.200	8	–	21	.276
Northwestern State	4	–	16	.200	7	–	22	.241
McNeese State	2	–	18	.100	5	–	24	.172
† 2020 Southland tournament winner As of March 7, 2020; Rankings from AP poll

The 2019–20 New Orleans Privateers women's basketball team represented the University of New Orleans during the 2019–20 NCAA Division I women's basketball season. The Privateers were led by ninth-year head coach Keeshawn Davenport and played their home games at the Lakefront Arena in New Orleans, Louisiana. They were members of the Southland Conference. They ended the season with a win–loss record of 17–12, 13–7 in Southland play, to finished in fifth place in the conference.

== Roster ==
2019–20 New Orleans Privateers women's basketball team
Players
Coaches

Pos.	#	Name	Height	Year	Previous school	Hometown
G/F	00	Nia Jordan	6 ft 1 in (1.85 m)		Neumann & Gorretti HS	Philadelphia, PA
G	1	Jada Duncantell	5 ft 4 in (1.63 m)	Jr	Natchitoches Central HS	Natchitoches, LA
G	3	Rehema Franklin	5 ft 3 in (1.6 m)	Sr	Pearl River CC	Pearl River, LA
G	4	Vaqueia Pimpton	5 ft 8 in (1.73 m)	Sr	Holmes CC	Tallahatchie, MS
G	5	Traya Bruce	5 ft 7 in (1.7 m)	So	South LaFourche HS	Cut Off, LA
G	11	Annalise Brisco	5 ft 10 in (1.78 m)	Jr	Clear Falls HS	Houston, TX
C	13	Kayla Thomas	6 ft 5 in (1.96 m)	RS Sr	Mastery Charter HS; Central Florida	Philadelphia, PA
G	20	Jada Swafford	5 ft 10 in (1.78 m)	Sr	Union Academy HS	Alexandria, LA
G	21	Mia Deck	5 ft 8 in (1.73 m)	Fr	Frisco Lone Star HS	Dallas, TX
G	23	Dionjhae Thomas	5 ft 6 in (1.68 m)	RS Jr	Houma Christian HS	Thibodaux, LA
G	25	Mary Delgado	5 ft 8 in (1.73 m)	Fr	Miami Northwestern Sr. HS	Miami, FL
F	31	Asia Woods	6 ft 0 in (1.83 m)	Sr	Lutheran HS	Houston, TX
F	32	Whitley Larry	6 ft 1 in (1.85 m)	Sr	Rayne HS	Rayne, LA
F	34	Kayla Malone	5 ft 11 in (1.8 m)	Sr	Pearl River CC	Oxford, MS

Head coach

- Keeshawn Davenport (New Orleans)

Assistant coach(es)

- Wyketha Harrell (UMKC)
- Alpha English (San José State)
- Kristin Moore (St. John's)

Legend

- (C) Team captain
- (S) Suspended
- (I) Ineligible
- (W) Walk-on
- Injured
- Current redshirt

Roster
Last update: September 21, 2024

== Schedule ==
Date time, TV	Rank^{#}	Opponent^{#}	Result	Record	Site (attendance) city, state
Non-conference regular season
November 5, 2019*; 6:30 p.m., SECN+		at LSU	L 49–83	0–1	Pete Maravich Assembly Center (1,192); Baton Rouge, LA
November 8, 2019*; 6:30 p.m., SECN+		at No. 23 Arkansas	L 52–82	0–2	Bud Walton Arena (6,801); Fayetteville, AR
November 12, 2019*; 11:00 a.m.		Pensacola Christian	W 91–31	1–2	Lakefront Arena (921); New Orleans, LA
November 15, 2019*; 3:00 p.m., SECN+		at Ole Miss	W 69–64	2–2	The Pavilion at Ole Miss (1,630); Oxford, MS
November 21, 2019*; 7:00 p.m.		Louisiana	L 60–65	2–3	Lakefront Arena (321); New Orleans, LA
November 27, 2019*; 7:00 p.m., ESPN+		at Texas State	L 49–51	2–4	Strahan Coliseum (912); San Marcos, TX
December 1, 2019*; 1:00 p.m.		at Iowa State	L 53–71	2–5	Hilton Coliseum (9,266); Ames, IA
December 14, 2019*; 4:00 p.m.		Tougaloo	W 91–69	3–5	Lakefront Arena (241); New Orleans, LA
Southland regular season
December 18, 2019; 5:30 p.m., ESPN3		at Abilene Christian	L 62–76	3–6 (0–1)	Moody Coliseum (388); Abilene, TX
December 21, 2019; 2:00 p.m.		Sam Houston State	L 46–78	3–7 (0–2)	Lakefront Arena (221); New Orleans, LA
Non-conference regular season
December 28, 2019*; 11:00 a.m.		North Dakota	W 79–73	4–7	Lakefront Arena (138); New Orleans, LA
Southland regular season
January 2, 2020; 7:00 p.m., ESPN+		at Lamar	W 62–57	5–7 (1–2)	Montagne Center (927); Beaumont, TX
January 4, 2020; 4:00 p.m.		Stephen F. Austin	W 53–50	6–7 (2–2)	Lakefront Arena (407); New Orleans, LA
January 8, 2020; 7:00 p.m.		at Central Arkansas	W 49–37	7–7 (3–2)	Farris Center (329); Conway, AR
January 11, 2020; 2:00 p.m.		at Incarnate Word	W 67–55	8–7 (4–2)	McDermott Center (137); San Antonio, TX
January 18, 2020; 4:00 p.m.		McNeese State	W 78–59	9–7 (5–2)	Lakefront Arena (437); New Orleans, LA
January 22, 2020; 7:00 p.m.		Texas A&M–Corpus Christi	L 53–83	9–8 (5–3)	Lakefront Arena (228); New Orleans, LA
January 25, 2020; 4:00 p.m.		Nicholls	W 77–65	10–8 (6–3)	Lakefront Arena (326); New Orleans, LA
January 29, 2020; 6:30 p.m.		at Northwestern State	W 77–63	11–8 (7–3)	Prather Coliseum (815); Natchitoches, LA
February 1, 2020; 1:00 p.m.		at Southeastern Louisiana	L 57–73	11–9 (7–4)	University Center (548); Hammond, LA
February 5, 2020; 7:00 p.m.		Houston Baptist	W 88–84 ^{OT}	12–9 (8–4)	Lakefront Arena (352); New Orleans, LA
February 8, 2020; 2:00 p.m., ESPN3		at Stephen F. Austin	L 47–59	12–10 (8–5)	William R. Johnson Coliseum (2,971); Nacogdoches, TX
February 12, 2020; 7:00 p.m.		Central Arkansas	W 85–73	13–10 (9–5)	Lakefront Arena (236); New Orleans, LA
February 15, 2020; 4:00 p.m.		Incarnate Word	W 61–57	14–10 (10–5)	Lakefront Arena (166); New Orleans, LA
February 22, 2020; 1:00 p.m.		at McNeese State	W 85–59	15–10 (11–5)	H&HP Complex (2,221); Lake Charles, LA
February 26, 2020; 7:00 p.m.		at Texas A&M–Corpus Christi	L 40–43	15–11 (11–6)	American Bank Center (1,835); Corpus Christi, TX
February 29, 2020; 1:00 p.m.		at Nicholls	L 68–70	15–12 (11–7)	Stopher Gymnasium (333); Thibodaux, LA
March 4, 2020; 7:00 p.m.		Northwestern State	W 82–76	16–12 (12–7)	Lakefront Arena (258); New Orleans, LA
March 7, 2020; 4:00 p.m.		Southeastern Louisiana	W 58–47	17–12 (13–7)	Lakefront Arena (547); New Orleans, LA
2020 Hercules Tires Southland basketball tournament
March 12, 2020; 11:00 a.m., ESPN+		Southeastern Louisiana; First round	Canceled due to COVID-19 issues		Merrell Center; Katy, TX
*Non-conference game. ^{#}Rankings from AP poll. (#) Tournament seedings in parentheses. All times are in Central.

== See also ==
- 2019–20 New Orleans Privateers men's basketball team
