= 2019–20 McNeese State Cowgirls basketball team =

Intercollegiate basketball season

2019–20 McNeese State Cowgirls basketball
- Conference: Southland Conference
- Record: 5–24 (2–18 Southland)
- Head coach: Kacie Cryer (4th season)
- Assistant coaches: Patrece Carter; Amanda Clemons; Brittany Bigott
- Home arena: Health and Human Performance Education Complex (Capacity: 4,200)

2019–20 Southland Conference women's basketball standings
	Conf.				Overall
Team	W		L	PCT	W		L	PCT
Texas A&M-CC	17	–	3	.850	23	–	7	.767
Abilene Christian	16	–	4	.800	24	–	5	.828
Stephen F. Austin	16	–	4	.800	23	–	6	.793
Sam Houston State	14	–	6	.700	19	–	10	.655
New Orleans	13	–	7	.650	17	–	12	.586
Incarnate Word	10	–	10	.500	14	–	15	.483
Nicholls	10	–	10	.500	13	–	16	.448
Central Arkansas	9	–	11	.450	13	–	16	.448
Southeastern Louisiana	9	–	11	.450	12	–	17	.414
Lamar	6	–	14	.300	10	–	19	.345
Houston Baptist	4	–	16	.200	8	–	21	.276
Northwestern State	4	–	16	.200	7	–	22	.241
McNeese State	2	–	18	.100	5	–	24	.172
† 2020 Southland tournament winner As of March 7, 2020; Rankings from AP poll

The 2019–20 McNeese State Cowgirls basketball team represented McNeese State University during the 2019–20 NCAA Division I women's basketball season. The Cowgirls, led by fourth year head coach Kacie Cryer, played all their home games at the Health and Human Performance Education Complex. They were members of the Southland Conference.

== Previous season ==
The Cowgirls finished the season 7–22, 5–13 in Southland play to finish in a tie for tenth place. They failed to qualify for the Southland women's tournament.

== Roster ==
2019–20 McNeese State Cowboys women's basketball team
Players
Coaches

Pos.	#	Name	Height	Year	Previous school	Hometown
G	0	Lizzy Ratcliff	5 ft 7 in (1.7 m)	Fr	Teurlings Catholic HS	Lafayette, LA
G	1	Reagan Bolton	5 ft 8 in (1.73 m)	Sr	St. Thomas Aquinas HS	Hammond, LA
F	2	Bre'Ashlee Jones	5 ft 7 in (1.7 m)	Sr	Jewel Sumner HS	Kentwood, LA
G	2	Jahquell Robinson	5 ft 4 in (1.63 m)	So	West Monroe HS	West Monroe, LA
G	4	Rayah Haynes	5 ft 6 in (1.68 m)	So	Zachary HS	Zachary, LA
G	12	Kyla Hamilton	5 ft 6 in (1.68 m)	Fr	Sam Houston HS	Westlake, LA
F	14	Delilah Van Campen	6 ft 1 in (1.85 m)	Fr	Fort Bend Travis HS	Richmond, TX
G	20	Shaela Gardner	5 ft 10 in (1.78 m)	Jr	Chipola College	Memphis, TN
G	22	Callie Maddox	6 ft 0 in (1.83 m)	RS So	Fairview HS	Grant, LA
F	24	Divine Tanks	6 ft 1 in (1.85 m)	So	Barbe HS	Lake Charles, LA
G	25	Sky Jasper	5 ft 11 in (1.8 m)	Sr	Coffeeville CC	Houma, LA
F	30	Damilola Balogun	6 ft 0 in (1.83 m)	Sr	Bossier Parish CC	Lagos, Nigeria
	33	Jordyn Cross	5 ft 9 in (1.75 m)	So	University Academy of Central Louisiana; LSU-Eunice	Pitkin, LA
	40	Maia Robinson	6 ft 2 in (1.88 m)	So	Denham Springs HS	Denham Springs, Louisiana

Head coach

- Kacie Cryer (LSU–Shreveport)

Assistant coach(es)

- Patrece Carter (Louisiana Christian)
- Amanda Clemons (Louisiana Christian)
- Brittany Bigott (St. Thomas (TX))

Legend

- (C) Team captain
- (S) Suspended
- (I) Ineligible
- (W) Walk-on
- Injured
- Current redshirt

Roster
Last update: December 22, 2019

== Schedule ==
Date time, TV	Rank^{#}	Opponent^{#}	Result	Record	Site (attendance) city, state
Non-conference regular season
Nov 5, 2019*; 11:30 am		at SMU	L 60–81	0–1	Moody Coliseum (1,148); Dallas, TX
Nov 8, 2019*; 6:30 pm		Centenary	W 116–37	1–1	H&HP Complex (2,277); Lake Charles, LA
Nov 11, 2019*; 7:00 pm, SECN+		at No. 22 Arkansas	L 58–101	1–2	Bud Walton Arena (1,238); Fayetteville, AR
Nov 14, 2019*; 6:00 pm, ESPN+		at Louisiana	L 55–75	1–3	CajunDome (883); Lafayette, LA
Nov 24, 2019*; 2:00 pm		at UAB	L 70–97	1–4	Bartow Arena (376); Birmingham, AL
Nov 27, 2019*; 12:00 pm		Rice	L 50–81	1–5	H&HP Complex (2,090); Lake Charles, LA
Dec 1, 2019*; 2:00 pm		Louisiana–Monroe	W 72–69	2–5	H&HP Complex (2,311); Lake Charles, LA
Dec 5, 2019*; 6:30 pm		at Louisiana Tech	L 54–79	2–6	Thomas Assembly Center (1,724); Ruston, LA
Dec 18, 2019*; 5:30 pm		LSU–Shreveport	W 81–77	3–6	H&HP Complex (2,478); Lake Charles, LA
Southland regular season
Dec 21, 2019; 2:00 pm, ESPN+		at Stephen F. Austin	L 51–82	3–7 (0–1)	William R. Johnson Coliseum (843); Nacogdoches, TX
Jan 2, 2020; 6:30 pm		at Sam Houston State	L 59–92	3–8 (0–2)	Bernard Johnson Coliseum (473); Huntsville, TX
Jan 4, 2020; 1:00 pm		Central Arkansas	L 57–70	3–9 (0–3)	H&HP Complex (2,137); Lake Charles, LA
Jan 8, 2020; 6:30 pm		Abilene Christian	L 73–90	3–10 (0–4)	H&HP Complex (2,107); Lake Charles, LA
Jan 11, 2020; 1:00 pm		Northwestern State	W 61–51	4–10 (1–4)	H&HP Complex (2,739); Lake Charles, LA
Jan 15, 2020; 6:30 pm		at Incarnate Word	L 56–73	4–11 (1–5)	McDermott Center (400); San Antonio, TX
Jan 18, 2020; 4:00 pm		at New Orleans	L 59–78	4–12 (1–6)	Lakefront Arena (437); New Orleans, LA
Jan 22, 2020; 6:30 pm		Southeastern Louisiana	L 67–74	4–13 (1–7)	H&HP Complex (2,139); Lake Charles, LA
Jan 25, 2020; 1:00 pm		Houston Baptist	W 88–72	5–13 (2–7)	H&HP Complex (3,041); Lake Charles, LA
Jan 29, 2020; 6:00 pm		at Nicholls	L 63–79	5–14 (2–8)	Stopher Gymnasium (544); Thibodaux, LA
Feb 1, 2020; 1:00 pm, ESPN3		Lamar	L 69–87	5–15 (2–9)	H&HP Complex (4,094); Lake Charles, LA
Feb 5, 2020; 6:30 pm		Texas A&M–Corpus Christi	L 59–73	5–16 (2–10)	H&HP Complex (2,269); Lake Charles, LA
Feb 8, 2020; 1:00 pm		at Central Arkansas	L 49–70	5–17 (2–11)	Farris Center (555); Conway, AR
Feb 15, 2020; 1:00 pm		at Northwestern State	L 60–70	5–18 (2–12)	Prather Coliseum (839); Natchitoches, LA
Feb 19, 2020; 6:30 pm		Incarnate Word	L 71–72	5–19 (2–13)	H&HP Complex (2,344); Lake Charles, LA
Feb 22, 2020; 1:00 pm		New Orleans	L 59–85	5–20 (2–14)	H&HP Complex (2,221); Lake Charles, LA
Feb 26, 2020; 7:00 pm		at Southeastern Louisiana	L 48–87	5–21 (2–15)	University Center (593); Hammond, LA
Feb 29, 2020; 2:00 pm		at Houston Baptist	L 54–56	5–22 (2–16)	Sharp Gymnasium (583); Houston, TX
Mar 4, 2020; 6:30 pm		Nicholls	L 53–72	5–23 (2–17)	H&HP Complex (2,502); Lake Charles, LA
Mar 7, 2020; 2:00 pm, ESPN+		at Lamar	L 70–80	5–24 (2–18)	Montagne Center; Beaumont, TX
*Non-conference game. ^{#}Rankings from AP Poll. (#) Tournament seedings in parentheses. All times are in Central Time.

== See also ==
2019–20 McNeese State Cowboys basketball team
