= 2019–20 Houston Baptist Huskies women's basketball team =

Intercollegiate basketball season

2019–20 Houston Baptist Huskies women's basketball
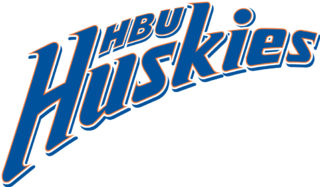
- Conference: Southland Conference
- Record: 8–21 (4–16 Southland)
- Head coach: Donna Finnie (7th season)
- Assistant coaches: Becca Allison; Amber Moore; Anna Strickland
- Home arena: Sharp Gymnasium (Capacity: 1,000)

2019–20 Southland Conference women's basketball standings
| | Conf. | | | | Overall |
| Team | W | | L | PCT | W | | L | PCT |
|---|---|---|---|---|---|---|---|---|
| Texas A&M-CC | 17 | – | 3 | .850 | 23 | – | 7 | .767 |
| Abilene Christian | 16 | – | 4 | .800 | 24 | – | 5 | .828 |
| Stephen F. Austin | 16 | – | 4 | .800 | 23 | – | 6 | .793 |
| Sam Houston State | 14 | – | 6 | .700 | 19 | – | 10 | .655 |
| New Orleans | 13 | – | 7 | .650 | 17 | – | 12 | .586 |
| Incarnate Word | 10 | – | 10 | .500 | 14 | – | 15 | .483 |
| Nicholls | 10 | – | 10 | .500 | 13 | – | 16 | .448 |
| Central Arkansas | 9 | – | 11 | .450 | 13 | – | 16 | .448 |
| Southeastern Louisiana | 9 | – | 11 | .450 | 12 | – | 17 | .414 |
| Lamar | 6 | – | 14 | .300 | 10 | – | 19 | .345 |
| Houston Baptist | 4 | – | 16 | .200 | 8 | – | 21 | .276 |
| Northwestern State | 4 | – | 16 | .200 | 7 | – | 22 | .241 |
| McNeese State | 2 | – | 18 | .100 | 5 | – | 24 | .172 |
† 2020 Southland tournament winner As of March 7, 2020; Rankings from AP poll

The 2019–20 Houston Baptist Huskies women's basketball team represented Houston Baptist University in the 2019–20 college basketball season. The Huskies, led by seventh-year head coach Donna Finnie, played their home games at the Sharp Gymnasium and were members of the Southland Conference. They finished the season 8–21, 4–16 in Southland play to finish in a tie for 11th place. They failed to qualify for the Southland women's tournament, but the tournament was cancelled due to the coronavirus pandemic.

== Previous season ==
The Huskies finished the season 8–20, 3–15 in Southland play to finish in a tie for last place. They failed to qualify for the Southland women's tournament.

== Roster ==
2019–20 Houston Baptist Huskies women's basketball team
Players
Coaches

| Pos. | # | Name | Height | Year | Previous school | Hometown |
|---|---|---|---|---|---|---|
| G | 0 | Takara Wade | 5 ft 4 in (1.63 m) | Sr | Desert Vista HS/Mesa CC | Goodyear, AZ |
| G | 3 | Shannon Jones | 5 ft 10 in (1.78 m) | Sr | Crosby HS | Crosby, TX |
| G | 5 | Kennedy Wilson | 5 ft 6 in (1.68 m) | Fr | Timberview HS | Mansfield, TX |
| G | 10 | Timia Jefferson | 5 ft 9 in (1.75 m) | Fr | Timberview HS | Mansfield, TX |
| F | 11 | Patience Idoko | 5 ft 11 in (1.8 m) | Jr | Kilgore College | Makurdi Benue State, Nigeria |
| G | 13 | Megan Valdez-Crader | 5 ft 5 in (1.65 m) | Jr | Johnson HS | San Antonio, TX |
| F | 14 | N'Denasija Collins | 6 ft 0 in (1.83 m) | Fr | Timberview HS | Mansfield, TX |
| G | 15 | Julija Vujakovic | 5 ft 9 in (1.75 m) | So | Lycee des Garcons du Luxembourg | Bereldange, Luxembourg |
| F | 21 | Ásta Júlía Grímsdóttir | 6 ft 1 in (1.85 m) | Fr | Menntaskólinn HS | Reykjavík, Iceland |
| G | 22 | Sydney Carr | 5 ft 8 in (1.73 m) | Sr | Crosby HS | Crosby, TX |
| F | 23 | Lauren Calver | 6 ft 1 in (1.85 m) | Sr | Heathcote HS | Helensburgh, Australia |
| F | 24 | Taylor Kollmorgan | 6 ft 0 in (1.83 m) | Sr | Second Baptist HS | Houston, TX |
| C | 25 | Abbey Sutherland | 6 ft 4 in (1.93 m) | Fr | Monivae College | Hamilton, Victoria, Australia |
| C | 33 | Marilyn Nzoiwu | 6 ft 3 in (1.91 m) | So | Cedar Ridge HS | Round Rock, TX |
| G | | Anna Maguire | 5 ft 6 in (1.68 m) | Jr | Saint Peters HS | Belfast, Northern Ireland |

Head coach

- Donna Finnie (Heriot–Watt)

Assistant coach(es)

- Becca Allison (Old Dominion)
- Amber Moore (Illinois)
- Anna Strickland (Houston Baptist)

Legend

- (C) Team captain
- (S) Suspended
- (I) Ineligible
- (W) Walk-on
- Injured
- Current redshirt

Roster
Last update: December 23, 2019

== Schedule and results ==
| Date time, TV | Rank^{#} | Opponent^{#} | Result | Record | Site (attendance) city, state |
Non-conference schedule
| Nov 5, 2019*; 7:00 pm | | LSU–Shreveport | W 67–44 | 1–0 | Sharp Gymnasium (184); Houston, TX |
| Nov 12, 2019*; 7:00 pm | | Paul Quinn | W 63–34 | 2–0 | Sharp Gymnasium (118); Houston, TX |
| Nov 14, 2019*; 7:00 pm, ESPN+ | | at No. 2 Baylor | L 42–114 | 2–1 | Ferrell Center (7,539); Waco, TX |
| Nov 17, 2019*; 2:00 pm | | at Houston | L 60–82 | 2–2 | Fertitta Center (667); Houston, TX |
| Nov 23, 2019*; 2:00 pm | | at Oral Roberts | W 74–73 | 3–2 | Mabee Center (1,339); Tulsa, OK |
| Nov 25, 2019*; 7:00 pm, ESPN3 | | at Wichita State | L 42–59 | 3–3 | Charles Koch Arena (1,406); Wichita, KS |
| Dec 1, 2019*; 2:00 pm | | Northern Arizona | L 62–79 | 3–4 | Sharp Gymnasium (94); Houston, TX |
| Dec 7, 2019*; 12:00 pm, ESPN+ | | at Louisiana–Monroe | W 72–65 | 4–4 | Fant–Ewing Coliseum (681); Monroe, LA |
| Dec 15, 2019*; 12:00 pm | | at Texas Tech | L 44–77 | 4–5 | Gallagher-Iba Arena (3,557); Stillwater, OK |
Southland Conference schedule
| Dec 18, 2019; 7:00 pm | | Stephen F. Austin | L 42–59 | 4–6 (0–1) | Sharp Gymnasium (113); Houston, TX |
| Dec 21, 2019; 2:00 pm | | Southeastern Louisiana | L 59–69 | 4–7 (0–2) | Sharp Gymnasium (87); Houston, TX |
| Jan 1, 2020; 1:00 pm | | at Central Arkansas | L 39–63 | 4–8 (0–3) | Farris Center (102); Conway, AR |
| Jan 5, 2020; 2:00 pm | | at Northwestern State | L 60–69 | 4–9 (0–4) | Prather Coliseum (545); Natchitoches, LA |
| Jan 11, 2020; 2:00 pm, ESPN3 | | at Lamar | L 53–60 | 4–10 (0–5) | Montagne Center (912); Beaumont, TX |
| Jan 18, 2020; 2:00 pm | | Sam Houston State | L 69–97 | 4–11 (0–6) | Sharp Gymnasium (434); Houston, TX |
| Jan 22, 2020; 7:00 pm | | Nicholls | L 78–84 | 4–12 (0–7) | Sharp Gymnasium (119); Houston, TX |
| Jan 25, 2020; 1:00 pm | | at McNeese State | L 72–88 | 4–13 (0–8) | H&HP Complex (3,041); Lake Charles, LA |
| Jan 29, 2020; 1:00 pm | | at Incarnate Word | W 60–55 | 5–13 (1–8) | McDermott Center (337); San Antonio, TX |
| Feb 1, 2020; 2:00 pm | | Texas A&M–Corpus Christi | L 65–75 | 5–14 (1–9) | Sharp Gymnasium (205); Houston, TX |
| Feb 5, 2020; 7:00 pm | | at New Orleans | L 84–88 ^{OT} | 5–15 (1–10) | Lakefront Arena (352); New Orleans, LA |
| Feb 8, 2020; 2:00 pm | | Northwestern State | L 46–54 | 5–16 (1–11) | Sharp Gymnasium (374); Houston, TX |
| Feb 12, 2020; 5:30 pm | | at Abilene Christian | L 54–71 | 5–17 (1–12) | Moody Coliseum (649); Abilene, TX |
| Feb 15, 2020; 2:00 pm | | Lamar | W 72–59 | 6–17 (2–12) | Sharp Gymnasium (412); Houston, TX |
| Feb 19, 2020; 5:00 pm | | Abilene Christian | L 79–84 | 6–18 (2–13) | Sharp Gymnasium (159); Houston, TX |
| Feb 22, 2020; 3:00 pm | | at Sam Houston State | L 60–75 | 6–19 (2–14) | Bernard Johnson Coliseum; Huntsville, TX |
| Feb 26, 2020; 6:00 pm | | at Nicholls | L 53–57 | 6–20 (2–15) | Stopher Gymnasium (112); Thibodaux, LA |
| Feb 29, 2020; 2:00 pm | | McNeese State | W 56–54 | 7–20 (3–15) | Sharp Gymnasium (583); Houston, TX |
| Mar 4, 2020; 7:00 pm | | Incarnate Word | W 66–49 | 8–20 (4–15) | Sharp Gymnasium (212); Houston, TX |
| Mar 7, 2020; 1:00 pm | | at Texas A&M–Corpus Christi | L 47–58 | 8–21 (4–16) | American Bank Center (1,040); Corpus Christi, TX |
*Non-conference game. ^{#}Rankings from AP Poll. (#) Tournament seedings in parentheses. All times are in Central.

== See also ==
- 2019–20 Houston Baptist Huskies men's basketball team
