= 2019–20 Lamar Lady Cardinals basketball team =

Intercollegiate basketball season

2019–20 Lamar Lady Cardinals basketball
- Conference: Southland Conference
- Record: 10–19 (6–14 Southland)
- Head coach: Aqua Franklin (1st season)
- Assistant coaches: Rodney Hill (1st season); Charinee Mitchell (1st season); Empress Davenport (1st season)
- Home arena: Montagne Center (Capacity: 10,080)

2019–20 Southland Conference women's basketball standings
| | Conf. | | | | Overall |
| Team | W | | L | PCT | W | | L | PCT |
|---|---|---|---|---|---|---|---|---|
| Texas A&M-CC | 17 | – | 3 | .850 | 23 | – | 7 | .767 |
| Abilene Christian | 16 | – | 4 | .800 | 24 | – | 5 | .828 |
| Stephen F. Austin | 16 | – | 4 | .800 | 23 | – | 6 | .793 |
| Sam Houston State | 14 | – | 6 | .700 | 19 | – | 10 | .655 |
| New Orleans | 13 | – | 7 | .650 | 17 | – | 12 | .586 |
| Incarnate Word | 10 | – | 10 | .500 | 14 | – | 15 | .483 |
| Nicholls | 10 | – | 10 | .500 | 13 | – | 16 | .448 |
| Central Arkansas | 9 | – | 11 | .450 | 13 | – | 16 | .448 |
| Southeastern Louisiana | 9 | – | 11 | .450 | 12 | – | 17 | .414 |
| Lamar | 6 | – | 14 | .300 | 10 | – | 19 | .345 |
| Houston Baptist | 4 | – | 16 | .200 | 8 | – | 21 | .276 |
| Northwestern State | 4 | – | 16 | .200 | 7 | – | 22 | .241 |
| McNeese State | 2 | – | 18 | .100 | 5 | – | 24 | .172 |
† 2020 Southland tournament winner As of March 7, 2020; Rankings from AP poll

The 2019–20 Lamar Lady Cardinals basketball team represented Lamar University during the 2019–20 NCAA Division I women's basketball season. The Lady Cardinals, led by first year head coach Aqua Franklin, played their home games at the Montagne Center as members of the Southland Conference. They finished the season 10–19, 6–14 in Southland play to finish in tenth place. They failed to qualify for the Southland women's tournament, which would eventually be cancelled due to the coronavirus pandemic.

== Previous season ==
The Lady Cardinals finished the 2018–19 season with an overall record of 24–7. They won the Southland Conference regular season championship were 17–1 in Southland play. After losing to Abilene Christian in the Southland Conference tournament semi-final game 79–88, the Lady Cardinals were an automatic qualifier to the WNIT. Their season ended with a first round 71–73 loss to the South Alabama in the first round. The loss ended a 42 home court win streak which started on November 16, 2016. Chastadie Barrs set the NCAA Division I steals record in the WNIT game at 192. She had tied the steals record of 191 the previous season.

== Roster ==
2019–20 Lamar Lady Cardinals women's basketball team
Players
Coaches

| Pos. | # | Name | Height | Year | Previous school | Hometown |
|---|---|---|---|---|---|---|
| G | 0 | Kayla Mitchell | 5 ft 3 in (1.6 m) | Fr | Jonesboro HS | Jonesboro, AR |
| G | 1 | Jadyn Pimentel | 5 ft 3 in (1.6 m) | Jr | Parkway North HS | St. Louis, MO |
| G | 2 | Angel Hastings | 5 ft 6 in (1.68 m) | So | Wagner HS | San Antonio, TX |
| C | 4 | Briana Laidler | 6 ft 1 in (1.85 m) | Sr | Spruce Creek HS | Port Orange, FL |
| G | 5 | Amber Vidal | 5 ft 6 in (1.68 m) | Sr | O'Conner HS; Nebraska–Omaha | San Antonio, TX |
| G | 10 | Malay McQueen | 5 ft 7 in (1.7 m) | Fr | Bowie HS | Arlington, TX |
| F | 12 | Micaela Wilson | 6 ft 1 in (1.85 m) | Jr | Rayville HS | Rayville, LA |
| G | 13 | Shedricka Pierson | 5 ft 9 in (1.75 m) | Jr | Brusly HS | Brusly, LA |
| C | 20 | Rikiah Cowart | 6 ft 2 in (1.88 m) | Jr | Nova HS | Lauderhill, FL |
| F | 22 | Miya Crump | 6 ft 1 in (1.85 m) | Fr | Yates HS | Houston, TX |
| G | 24 | Ashlan Miles | 5 ft 9 in (1.75 m) | Sr | Dallas Christian HS | Dallas, TX |
| C | 32 | Umaja Collins | 6 ft 2 in (1.88 m) | So | Mesquite Horn HS | Mesquite, TX |

Head coach

- Aqua Franklin (Texas A&M)

Assistant coach(es)

- Rodney Hill (Texas A&M)
- Charinee Mitchell (Southeastern Louisiana)
- Empress Davenport (Texas)

Legend

- (C) Team captain
- (S) Suspended
- (I) Ineligible
- (W) Walk-on
- Injured
- Current redshirt

Roster
Last update: December 19, 2019

== Schedule ==
| Date time, TV | Rank^{#} | Opponent^{#} | Result | Record | High points | High rebounds | High assists | Site (attendance) city, state |
Exhibition schedule
| Nov 5, 2019*; 6:00 pm | | East Texas Baptist | W 64–47 | | 18 – Vidal | – | – | Montagne Center; Beaumont, TX |
Non-Conference schedule
| Nov 8, 2019*; 11:00 am, ESPN+ | | Oklahoma State | L 53–74 | 0–1 | 26 – Vidal | 13 – Laidler | 4 – Hastings | Gallagher-Iba Arena (3,345); Stillwater, OK |
| Nov 11, 2019*; 11:00 am | | Howard Payne | W 96–36 | 1–1 | 18 – Vidal | 11 – Laidler | 6 – Miles | Montagne Center (3,856); Beaumont, TX |
| Nov 14, 2019*; 6:00 pm, ACCNX | | at NC State | L 40–81 | 1–2 | 8 – Mitchell | 7 – Laidler | 4 – Mitchell | Reynolds Coliseum (2,612); Raleigh, NC |
| Nov 21, 2019*; 7:00 pm, ESPN+ | | No. 2 Baylor | L 28–90 | 1–3 | 13 – Hastings | 4 – Laidler | 2 – Mitchell | Ferrell Center (7,352); Waco, TX |
| Nov 25, 2019*; 7:030 pm, ESPN+ | | Louisiana | L 63–74 | 1–4 | 13 – Pimentel | 8 – Miles | 4 – Hastings | Montagne Center (912); Beaumont, TX |
| Nov 29, 2019*; 4:30 pm | | vs. Idaho; Shareslo Holiday Beach Classic | W 47–44 | 2–4 | 11 – Mitchell | 6 – Cowart | 2 – Vidal | Mott Athletics Center (75); San Luis Obispo, CA |
| Nov 30, 2019*; 4:30 am | | at Cal Poly; Sharelo Holiday Beach Classic | L 56–57 | 2–5 | 20 – Pimentel | 7 – Miles | 6 – Mitchell | Mott Athletics Center (375); San Luis Obispo |
| Dec 2, 2019*; 7:00 pm | | LeTourneau | W 90–38 | 3–5 | 22 – Pimentel | 10 – Laidler | 5 – Miles | Montagne Center (923); Beaumont, TX |
| Dec 8, 2019*; 2:00 pm, ESPN+ | | Denver | W 71–59 | 4–5 | 22 – Hastings | 6 – Laidler | 8 – Pimentel | Montagne Center (547); Beaumont, TX |
Conference schedule
| Dec 18, 2019; 7:00 pm | | at Southeastern Louisiana | W 65–57 | 5–5 (1–0) | 21 – Vidal | 11 – Laidler | 4 – Pimentel | University Center (433); Hammond, LA |
| Dec 21, 2019; 2:00 pm, ESPN3 | | Northwestern State | L 61–68 | 6–5 (2–0) | 18 – Vidal | 11 – Laidler | 10 – Mitchell | Montagne Center (801); Beaumont, TX |
| Jan 2, 2020; 7:00 pm, ESPN+ | | New Orleans | L 57–62 | 6–6 (2–1) | 11 – Laidler | 9 – Miles | 6 – Pimentel | Montagne Center (927); Beaumont, TX |
| Jan 4, 2020; 1:00 pm, ESPN3 | | at Abilene Christian | L 72–78 | 6–7 (2–2) | 29 – Hastings | 5 – Vidal | 7 – Pimentel | Moody Coliseum (481); Abilene, TX |
| Jan 8, 2020; 6:00 pm | | at Nicholls | W 84–78 | 7–7 (3–2) | 22 – Hastings | 10 – Laidler | 5 – Hastings | Stopher Gymnasium (156); Thibodaux, LA |
| Jan 11, 2020; 1:00 pm, ESPN3 | | Houston Baptist | W 60–53 | 8–7 (4–2) | 16 – Vidal | 11 – Laidler | 3 – Laidler | Montagne Center (912); Beaumont, TX |
| Jan 15, 2020; 6:30 pm, ESPN+ | | at Sam Houston State | L 47–68 | 8–8 (4–3) | 14 – Vidal | 8 – Laidler | 2 – Mitchell | Bernard Johnson Coliseum (751); Huntsville, TX |
| Jan 18, 2020; 1:00 pm | | at Texas A&M–Corpus Christi | L 39–49 | 8–9 (4–4) | 14 – Hastings | 6 – Vidal | 2 – Pimentel | American Bank Center (1,517); Corpus Christi, TX |
| Jan 22, 2020; 7:00 pm, ESPN+ | | Incarnate Word | L 48–67 | 8–10 (4–5) | 10 – Cowart | 6 – Cowart | 3 – Pimentel | Montagne Center (928); Beaumont, TX |
| Jan 25, 2020; 2:00 pm, ESPN3 | | Stephen F. Austin | L 53–54 | 8–11 (4–6) | 23 – Vidal | 12 – Laidler | 3 – Pimentel | Montagne Center (1,058); Beaumont, TX |
| Feb 1, 2020; 1:00 pm, ESPN3 | | at McNeese State | W 87–69 | 9–11 (5–6) | 29 – McQueen | 10 – Laidler | 6 – Pimentel | H&HP Complex (4,094); Lake Charles, LA |
| Feb 5, 2020; 7:00 pm | | at Central Arkansas | L 29–53 | 9–12 (5–7) | 7 – McQueen | 8 – Laidler | 2 – Pimentel | Farris Center (592); Conway, AR |
| Feb 8, 2020; 2:00 pm, ESPN3 | | Abilene Christian | L 49–75 | 9–13 (5–8) | 16 – Hastings | 10 – Laidler | 7 – Pimentel | Montagne Center (816); Beaumont, TX |
| Feb 12, 2020; 7:00 pm, ESPN+ | | Nicholls | L 60–62 | 9–14 (5–9) | 23 – Hastings | 11 – Laidler | 5 – Pimentel | Montagne Center (726); Beaumont, TX |
| Feb 15, 2020; 2:00 pm | | at Houston Baptist | L 59–72 | 9–15 (5–10) | 26 – Hastings | 10 – Laidler | 2 – Hastings | Sharp Gymnasium (412); Houston, TX |
| Feb 19, 2020; 7:00 pm, ESPN+ | | Sam Houston State | L 68–75 | 9–16 (5–11) | 24 – Vidal | 6 – Vidal | 5 – Pimentel | Montagne Center (741); Beaumont, TX |
| Feb 22, 2020; 2:00 pm, ESPN3 | | Texas A&M–Corpus Christi | L 56–64 | 9–17 (5–12) | 17 – Vidal | 7 – Laidler | 3 – Pimentel | Montagne Center; Beaumont, TX |
| Feb 26, 2020; 6:30 pm | | at Incarnate Word | L 67–68 ^{OT} | 9–18 (5–13) | 20 – Hastings | 5 – McQueen | 2 – Pimentel | McDermott Center (326); San Antonio, TX |
| Feb 29, 2020; 2:00 pm, ESPN+ | | at Stephen F. Austin | L 50–70 | 9–19 (5–14) | 13 – Vidal | 10 – Laidler | 3 – Pimentel | William R. Johnson Coliseum (2,382); Nacogdoches, TX |
| Mar 7, 2020; 2:00 pm, ESPN+ | | McNeese State | W 80–70 | 10–19 (6–14) | 17 – Vidal | 7 – Laidler | 7 – Pimentel | Montagne Center; Beaumont, TX |
*Non-conference game. ^{#}Rankings from AP Poll. (#) Tournament seedings in parentheses. All times are in Central Time.

== See also ==
2019–20 Lamar Cardinals basketball team
