= 2019–20 Nicholls Colonels women's basketball team =

Intercollegiate basketball season

2019–20 Nicholls Colonels women's basketball
- Conference: Southland Conference
- Record: 13–16 (10–10 Southland)
- Head coach: DoBee Plaisance (12th season)
- Assistant coaches: Jenny Nash; Chad Killinger; Conner McNelis
- Home arena: Stopher Gym

2019–20 Southland Conference women's basketball standings
	Conf.				Overall
Team	W		L	PCT	W		L	PCT
Texas A&M-CC	17	–	3	.850	23	–	7	.767
Abilene Christian	16	–	4	.800	24	–	5	.828
Stephen F. Austin	16	–	4	.800	23	–	6	.793
Sam Houston State	14	–	6	.700	19	–	10	.655
New Orleans	13	–	7	.650	17	–	12	.586
Incarnate Word	10	–	10	.500	14	–	15	.483
Nicholls	10	–	10	.500	13	–	16	.448
Central Arkansas	9	–	11	.450	13	–	16	.448
Southeastern Louisiana	9	–	11	.450	12	–	17	.414
Lamar	6	–	14	.300	10	–	19	.345
Houston Baptist	4	–	16	.200	8	–	21	.276
Northwestern State	4	–	16	.200	7	–	22	.241
McNeese State	2	–	18	.100	5	–	24	.172
† 2020 Southland tournament winner As of March 7, 2020; Rankings from AP poll

The 2019–20 Nicholls Colonels women's basketball team represented Nicholls State University during the 2019–20 NCAA Division I women's basketball season. The Colonels, led by twelfth-year head coach DoBee Plaisance, played their home games at Stopher Gym in Thibodaux, Louisiana as members of the Southland Conference.

They finished the season 13–16, 10–10 in Southland play, to finish in seventh place. Before they could play in the Southland women's tournament, however, the tournament was cancelled due to the coronavirus pandemic.

== Previous season ==
The Colonels finished the 2018–19 season 20–12, 14–4 in Southland play, to finish in third place. They lost to Texas A&M–Corpus Christi in the second round of the Southland women's tournament. They received an invitation to the 2019 Women's Basketball Invitational tournament where they lost in the first round to Southern Miss.

== Roster ==
2019–20 Nicholls State Colonels women's basketball team
Players
Coaches

Pos.	#	Name	Height	Year	Previous school	Hometown
G	0	Tykeria Williams	5 ft 6 in (1.68 m)	Sr	Lee HS	Montgomery, AL
G	2	Terris McKay	5 ft 4 in (1.63 m)	Fr	Ellender HS	Houma, LA
G	3	Kacie Fountain	5 ft 7 in (1.7 m)	Sr	Walker HS; Southwest Mississippi CC	Walker, LA
G	5	Airi Hamilton	5 ft 8 in (1.73 m)	Sr	Ponchatoula HS	Natchitoches, LA
G	11	Adrian Mann	5 ft 8 in (1.73 m)	So	South Callaway HS	Mokane, MO
G	13	Kinzie Hieneman	5 ft 7 in (1.7 m)	Jr	Brennan HS	San Antonio, TX
F	15	Lauryn Bowie	5 ft 9 in (1.75 m)	RS So	Duncanville HS	Duncanville, TX
G	22	Loan-Anh Johnson	5 ft 8 in (1.73 m)	So	Wichita South HS	Wichita, KS
F	24	Chelsie Cain	6 ft 0 in (1.83 m)	Fr	Dutchtown HS	Prairieville, LA
F	25	Chrystal Ezechukwu	6 ft 0 in (1.83 m)	Sr	Miller Grove HS; Jones County CC	Decatur, GA
C	32	Korie Leary	5 ft 10 in (1.78 m)	RS Jr	Lincoln HS	Dallas, TX
F	33	Bryanna Washington	5 ft 9 in (1.75 m)	Jr	Ranchview HS	Irving, TX

Head coach

- DoBee Plaisance (Southern Miss)

Assistant coach(es)

- Jenny Nash (Nicholls State)
- Chad Killinger (Franklin (IN))
- Connor McNelis (Southern Miss)

Legend

- (C) Team captain
- (S) Suspended
- (I) Ineligible
- (W) Walk-on
- Injured
- Current redshirt

Roster
Last update: December 23, 2019

== Schedule ==
Date time, TV	Rank^{#}	Opponent^{#}	Result	Record	Site (attendance) city, state
Non-conference regular season
November 5, 2019*; 7:00 p.m.		at Rice	L 47–71	0–1	Tudor Fieldhouse (567); Houston, TX
November 10, 2019*; 11:00 a.m., BTN+		at Indiana	L 47–111	0–2	Simon Skjodt Assembly Hall (3,337); Bloomington, IN
November 14, 2019*; 6:30 p.m.		at TCU	L 47–72	0–3	Schollmaier Arena (1,800); Fort Worth, TX
November 18, 2019*; 11:30 p.m.		Paul Quinn	W 101–68	1–3	Stopher Gymnasium (1,020); Thibodaux, LA
November 25, 2019*; 6:00 p.m.		Southern University (New Orleans); UTEP Thanksgiving Classic	W 94–61	2–3	Stopher Gymnasium (141); Thibodaux, LA
November 29, 2019*; 1:00 p.m., ESPN+		at Jacksonville; JU Thanksgiving Classic	L 55–72	2–4	Swisher Gymnasium (132); Jacksonville, FL
November 30, 2019*; 11:00 a.m.		vs. North Florida; JU Thanksgiving Classic	L 61–64	2–5	Swisher Gymnasium (79); Jacksonville, FL
December 3, 2019*; 11:00 a.m., SECN+		at LSU	L 32–63	2–6	Pete Maravich Assembly Center (6,970); Baton Rouge, LA
December 10, 2019*; 6:00 p.m.		Louisiana–Monroe	W 74–59	3–6	Stopher Gymnasium (197); Thibodaux, LA
Southland regular season
December 18, 2019; 7:00 p.m.		at Texas A&M–Corpus Christi	L 49–55	3–7 (0–1)	Dugan Wellness Center (868); Corpus Christi, TX
December 21, 2019; 1:00 p.m.		Abilene Christian	L 84–95 ^{OT}	3–8 (0–2)	Stopher Gymnasium (201); Thibodaux, LA
January 2, 2020; 6:30 p.m.		at Incarnate Word	L 51–53	3–9 (0–3)	McDermott Center (110); San Antonio, TX
January 4, 2020; 3:00 p.m.		at Sam Houston State	L 71–87	3–10 (0–4)	Bernard Johnson Coliseum (549); Huntsville, TX
January 8, 2020; 6:00 p.m.		Lamar	L 78–84	3–11 (0–5)	Stopher Gymnasium (156); Thibodaux, LA
January 11, 2020; 1:00 p.m.		at Southeastern Louisiana	W 67–65	4–11 (1–5)	University Center (549); Hammond, LA
January 15, 2020; 6:30 p.m.		at Northwestern State	L 54–58	4–12 (1–6)	Prather Coliseum (602); Natchitoches, LA
January 18, 2020; 1:00 p.m., ESPN3		Central Arkansas	L 46–53	4–13 (1–7)	Stopher Gymnasium (411); Thibodaux, LA
January 22, 2020; 7:00 p.m.		at Houston Baptist	W 84–78	5–13 (2–7)	Sharp Gymnasium (119); Houston, TX
January 25, 2020; 4:00 p.m.		at New Orleans	L 65–77	5–14 (2–8)	Lakefront Arena (326); New Orleans, LA
January 29, 2020; 6:00 p.m.		McNeese State	W 79–63	6–14 (3–8)	Stopher Gymnasium (544); Thibodaux, LA
February 5, 2020; 6:00 p.m.		Stephen F. Austin	L 61–78	6–15 (2–9)	Stopher Gymnasium (203); Thibodaux, LA
February 8, 2020; 1:00 p.m.		Sam Houston State	L 77–80	6–16 (3–10)	Stopher Gymnasium (277); Thibodaux, LA
February 12, 2020; 7:00 p.m., ESPN+		at Lamar	W 62–60	7–16 (4–10)	Montagne Center (726); Beaumont, TX
February 15, 2020; 1:00 p.m., ESPN3		Southeastern Louisiana	W 54–49	8–16 (5–10)	Stopher Gymnasium (287); Thibodaux, LA
February 19, 2020; 6:00 p.m.		Northwestern State	W 73–66	9–16 (6–10)	Stopher Gymnasium (211); Thibodaux, LA
February 22, 2020; 1:00 p.m.		at Central Arkansas	W 67–58	10–16 (7–10)	Farris Center (248); Conway, AR
February 26, 2020; 6:00 p.m.		Houston Baptist	W 57–53	11–16 (8–10)	Stopher Gymnasium (112); Thibodaux, LA
February 29, 2020; 1:00 p.m.		New Orleans	W 70–68	12–16 (9–10)	Stopher Gymnasium (333); Thibodaux, LA
March 4, 2020; 6:30 p.m.		at McNeese State	W 72–53	13–16 (10–10)	H&HP Complex (2,502); Lake Charles, LA
2020 Hercules Tires Southland Basketball Tournament
March 12, 2020; 1:30 p.m., ESPN+		Incarnate Word; First round	Canceled due to the COVID-19 pandemic		Merrell Center; Katy, TX
*Non-conference game. ^{#}Rankings from AP poll. (#) Tournament seedings in parentheses. All times are in Central.

== See also ==
- 2019–20 Nicholls Colonels men's basketball team
