= 2020 Southland Conference women's basketball tournament =

- Classification: Division I
- Season: 2019–20
- Teams: 8
- Site: Merrell Center; Katy, Texas
- Champions: Tournament cancelled
- Television: ESPN+/CBSSN

2019–20 Southland Conference women's basketball standings
	Conf.				Overall
Team	W		L	PCT	W		L	PCT
Texas A&M-CC	17	–	3	.850	23	–	7	.767
Abilene Christian	16	–	4	.800	24	–	5	.828
Stephen F. Austin	16	–	4	.800	23	–	6	.793
Sam Houston State	14	–	6	.700	19	–	10	.655
New Orleans	13	–	7	.650	17	–	12	.586
Incarnate Word	10	–	10	.500	14	–	15	.483
Nicholls	10	–	10	.500	13	–	16	.448
Central Arkansas	9	–	11	.450	13	–	16	.448
Southeastern Louisiana	9	–	11	.450	12	–	17	.414
Lamar	6	–	14	.300	10	–	19	.345
Houston Baptist	4	–	16	.200	8	–	21	.276
Northwestern State	4	–	16	.200	7	–	22	.241
McNeese State	2	–	18	.100	5	–	24	.172
† 2020 Southland tournament winner As of March 7, 2020; Rankings from AP poll

The 2020 Southland Conference women's basketball tournament, a part of the 2019–20 NCAA Division I women's basketball season, was scheduled to take place March 12–15, 2020 at the Merrell Center in Katy, Texas. The tournament was cancelled on March 12 just before the first game. The winner of the tournament would have received the Southland Conference's automatic bid to the 2020 NCAA tournament.

== Seeds and regular season standings ==
Only the top 8 teams qualified for the Southland Conference tournament. This chart shows all the teams records and standings and explains why teams advanced to the conference tourney or finished in certain tiebreaking positions.

2020 Southland Conference women's basketball tournament seeds
Seed	School	Conference record	Overall record (end of regular season)	Tiebreaker
1.	‡* Texas A&M–Corpus Christi	17–3	23–7	
2.	* Stephen F. Austin	16–4	23–6	2-0 vs AMCC
3.	# Abilene Christian	16–4	24–5	0-2 vs. AMCC
4.	# Sam Houston State	14–6	19–10	
5.	New Orleans	13–7	17–12	
6.	Nicholls	10–10	13–16	
7.	Incarnate Word	10–10	14–15	
8.	Southeastern Louisiana	9–11	12–17	
	‡ – Southland Conference regular season champions. * – Receive a first-round and second-round bye in the conference tournament. # – Receive a first-round bye in the conference tournament. Overall record are as of the end of the regular season.			

== Schedule ==
Tournament cancelled

Session	Game	Time*	Matchup^{#}	Score	Television
First round – Thursday, March 12
1	1	11:00 am	#5 New Orleans vs. #8 Southeastern Louisiana		ESPN+
1	2	1:30 pm	#6 Nicholls vs. #7 Incarnate Word		ESPN+
Quarterfinals – Friday, March 13
2	3	11:00 am	#4 Sam Houston State vs. Game 1 winner		ESPN+
2	4	1:30 pm	#3 Abilene Christian vs. Game 2 winner		ESPN+
Semifinals – Saturday, March 14
3	5	1:00 pm	#1 Texas A&M–Corpus Christi vs. Game 3 winner		ESPN+
3	6	3:30 pm	#2 Stephen F. Austin vs. Game 4 winner		ESPN+
Championship – Sunday, March 15
4	7	1:00 pm	Game 5 Winner vs. Game 6 winner		CBSSN
*Game times in CST. #-Rankings denote tournament seeding.

== Bracket ==
Tournament cancelled

First round Thursday, March 12; ESPN+
5	New Orleans
8	Southeastern Louisiana
7	Incarnate Word
6	Nicholls

Quarterfinals; Friday, March 13; ESPN+
4	Sam Houston State
3	Abilene Christian

Semifinals; Saturday, March 14; ESPN+
1	Texas A&M–Corpus Christi
2	Stephen F. Austin

Championship Game; Sunday, March 15; CBSSN

== See also ==
- 2020 Southland Conference men's basketball tournament
- Southland Conference women's basketball tournament
