= William R. Johnson Coliseum =

Multi-purpose arena in Nacogdoches, Texas

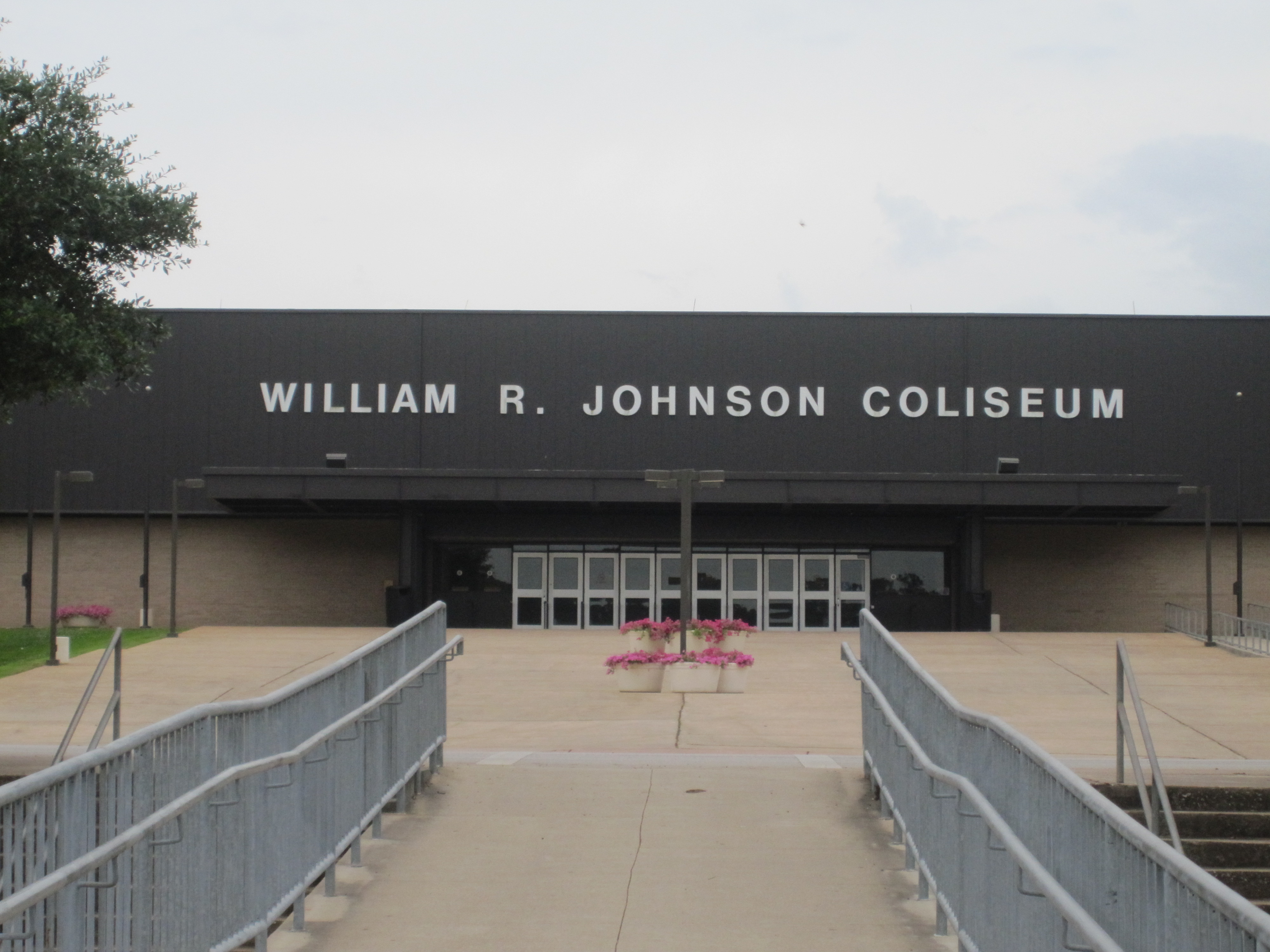
- Interactive map of William R. Johnson Coliseum
- Location: 700 East College Street; Nacogdoches, TX 75964
- Coordinates: 31°37′20″N 94°38′27″W
- Owner: Stephen F. Austin State University
- Operator: Stephen F. Austin State University
- Capacity: 7,203 (basketball)

Construction
- Opened: 1974

Tenants
- Stephen F. Austin Lumberjacks (basketball, volleyball)

William R. Johnson Coliseum is a 7,203-seat multi-purpose arena in Nacogdoches, Texas. Popularly referred to as The Sawmill, it is located at the corner of University Drive and East College Street, and is home to the Stephen F. Austin State University Lumberjacks basketball team and the Ladyjacks basketball team. Built in 1974, the coliseum seats 7,203. Two NCAA Women's Midwest Regional games have been played at the Coliseum, as well as a men's NIT game. During summer 2006, a new video board and ad panel were installed. The Coliseum was named after President William R. Johnson who retired from SFA on July 15, 1990, after 14 years of service. The Ladyjacks volleyball team played in the Coliseum until 2011 when they moved to the Robert H. Shelton Gymnasium.

The Coliseum is named after Dr. William R. Johnson, SFA's fourth president in the university's then 55-year history. At the age of 42 at the time of his inauguration, he was the youngest state university president to serve. Dr. Johnson served in the United States Air Force during the Korean Conflict and suffered burns from an explosion and he required a year of hospital treatment, delaying his enrollment in undergraduate programs at the University of Houston. A first-generation college student, his education was subsidized by the G. I. Bill. A native Texan, he completed his undergraduate and master's degrees at the University of Houston and his Ph.D. in history at the University of Oklahoma. He came to SFASU from Texas Tech University, where he served as vice president for academic affairs. Johnson expanded programs and buildings, including Liberal Arts North, the University Center, Forestry, Rusk, Chemistry, and the Steen Library. Johnson secured funds for a new Math and Nursing Building and served as chairman of an effort to create the Higher Education Assistance Fund, with a goal to provide regular funding for buildings statewide. He retired from SFA on July 15, 1990, and SFA's coliseum is named in his honor.

== See also ==
- List of NCAA Division I basketball arenas
