= Bernard Johnson Coliseum =

Multi-purpose arena in Huntsville, Texas

Johnson Coliseum
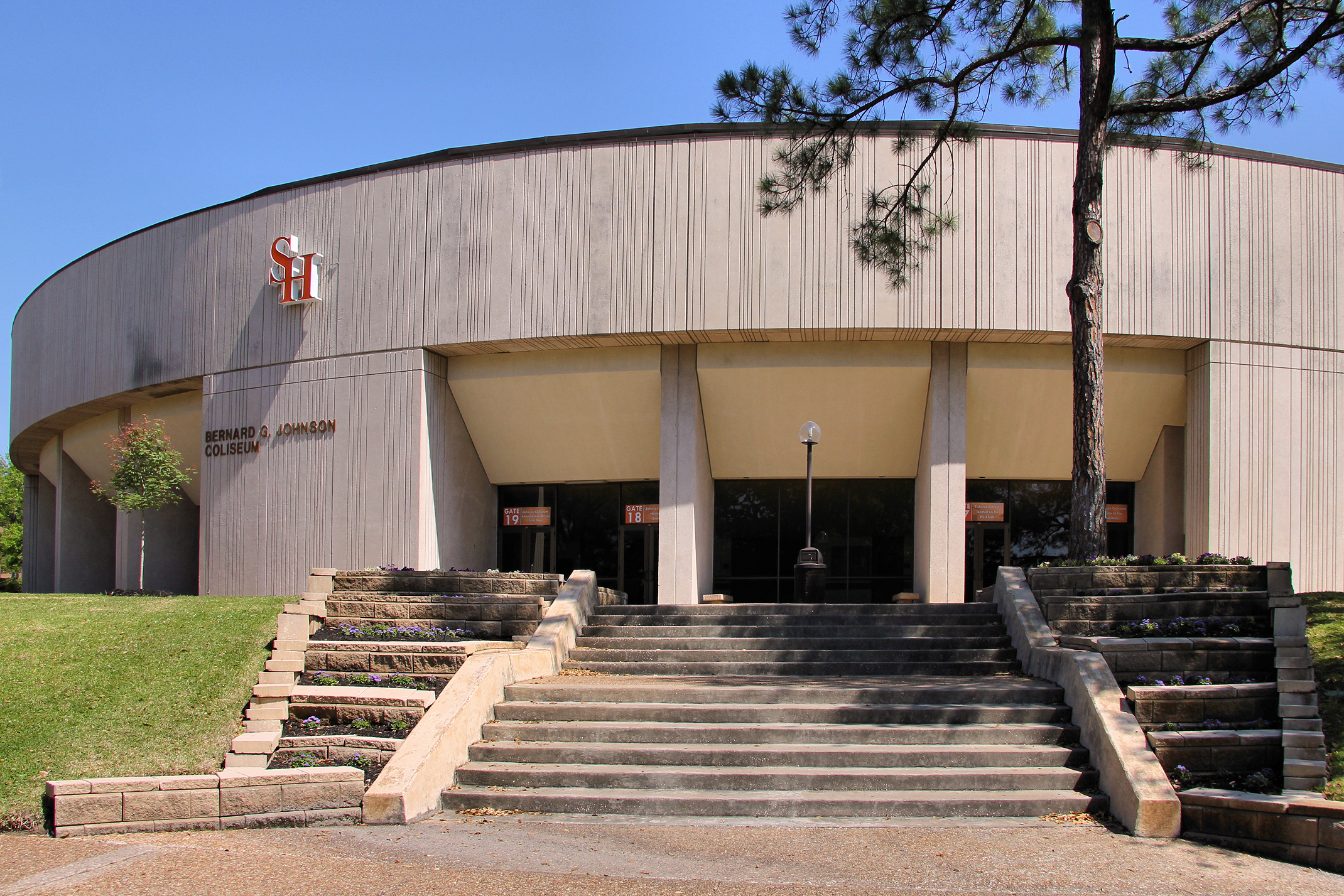
- Interactive map of Johnson Coliseum
- Full name: Bernard G. Johnson Coliseum
- Former names: University Coliseum (1976-1986)
- Location: 1964 Bobby K. Marks Drive; Huntsville, Texas 77340
- Coordinates: 30°42′46″N 95°32′46″W
- Owner: Sam Houston State University
- Operator: Sam Houston State University
- Capacity: 6,110
- Record attendance: 5,068

Construction
- Opened: February 9, 1976

Tenant
- Sam Houston State Bearkats (NCAA) (1977–present)

Bernard Johnson Coliseum is a 6,110-seat multi-purpose arena on the campus of Sam Houston State University in Huntsville, Texas. It was built in 1976 and is home to the Sam Houston Bearkats men's and women's basketball teams, as well as the Bearkats women's volleyball team. Originally named the University Coliseum, it was renamed in 1986 for longtime Board of Trustees member Bernard G. Johnson of Houston. It hosted the Southland Conference men's basketball tournament in 2003. It was also home to XWO Reborn, a professional wrestling organization that promoted shows throughout south Texas.

== Sammypalooza & Kat Comedy Showcase ==
Since the fall of 2010, the Bernard G. Johnson Coliseum has been to the home of Sammypalooza, a free concert event for the SHSU community.

2010: Lifehouse, Jack Ingram, Story of the Year, Chalie Boy, VerseCity, Clairmont, Tim Qualls, The Adamant

2011: Taking Back Sunday, Vertical Horizon, Oh, Sleeper, Phil Pritchett, Vice Verse Us, The Last Great Assault

2012: Ludacris, The All-American Rejects, Eve 6

2014: Wiz Khalifa, Capital Cities

2015: Panic! At the Disco, Cassadee Pope, Mary Lambert

2016: T.I., Josh Turner

Starting in 2011, the Kat Comedy Showcase event was also added.

2011: Gabriel Iglesias

2013 (Spring): Mike Epps

2013 (Fall): Aziz Ansari, Nick Kroll

2014: Nick Swardson, Judah Friedlander

2015: Damon Wayans, Jay Pharoah, Damon Wayans, Jr.

== See also ==
- List of NCAA Division I basketball arenas
