= Moody Coliseum (Abilene Christian University) =

Arena in Abilene, Texas

- Moody Coliseum
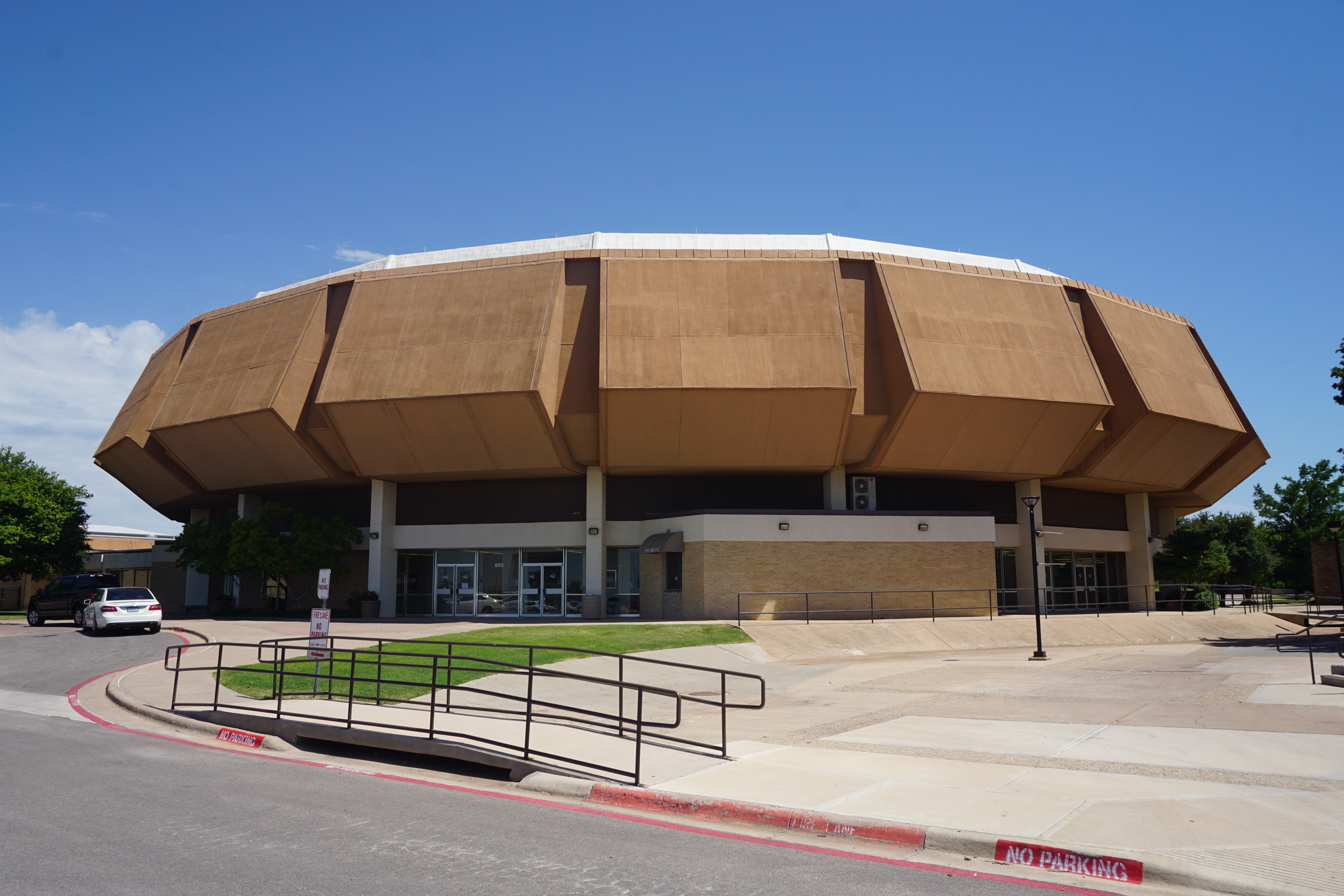
- Interactive map of Moody Coliseum
- Full name: Moody Coliseum
- Location: Abilene, Texas
- Coordinates: 32°28′13.2″N 99°42′33.3″W
- Owner: Abilene Christian University
- Operator: Abilene Christian University
- Capacity: 3,600

Construction
- Opened: 1968
- Renovated: 2022
- Cost: $50 million ($463 million in 2025 dollars)
- Architect: HOK
- Structural engineers: Walter P Moore; Freedom Enterprise Inc. Richard Barrios Consulting Engineer Inc. SPS Technology; Irwin Seating; Standard Iron & Wire Works Inc.
- Main contractor: Hoar Construction

Tenant
- Abilene Christian Wildcats

Moody Coliseum is a 3,600-seat multi-purpose arena in Abilene. It is home to the Abilene Christian Wildcats men's and women's basketball, and volleyball teams. It is also used for concerts, chapel services, graduations and other special events, with a maximum capacity of 3,600.

The arena recently reopened after undergoing extensive renovations. New features include:

- Additional leg room in the main seating in the coliseum.
- Larger seats in some sections.
- Improved accessibility.
- A 2,000-square-foot club room.
- Practice gymnasium.
- An academic center and main level hospitality suite.
- Additional offices for athletics administration.
- Upgraded locker rooms and training rooms.
- Upgraded restrooms and concessions.
- Upgraded audio/visual system, including 21 LED boards.

== See also ==
- List of NCAA Division I basketball arenas
