= Prather Coliseum =

Arena in Louisiana, United States

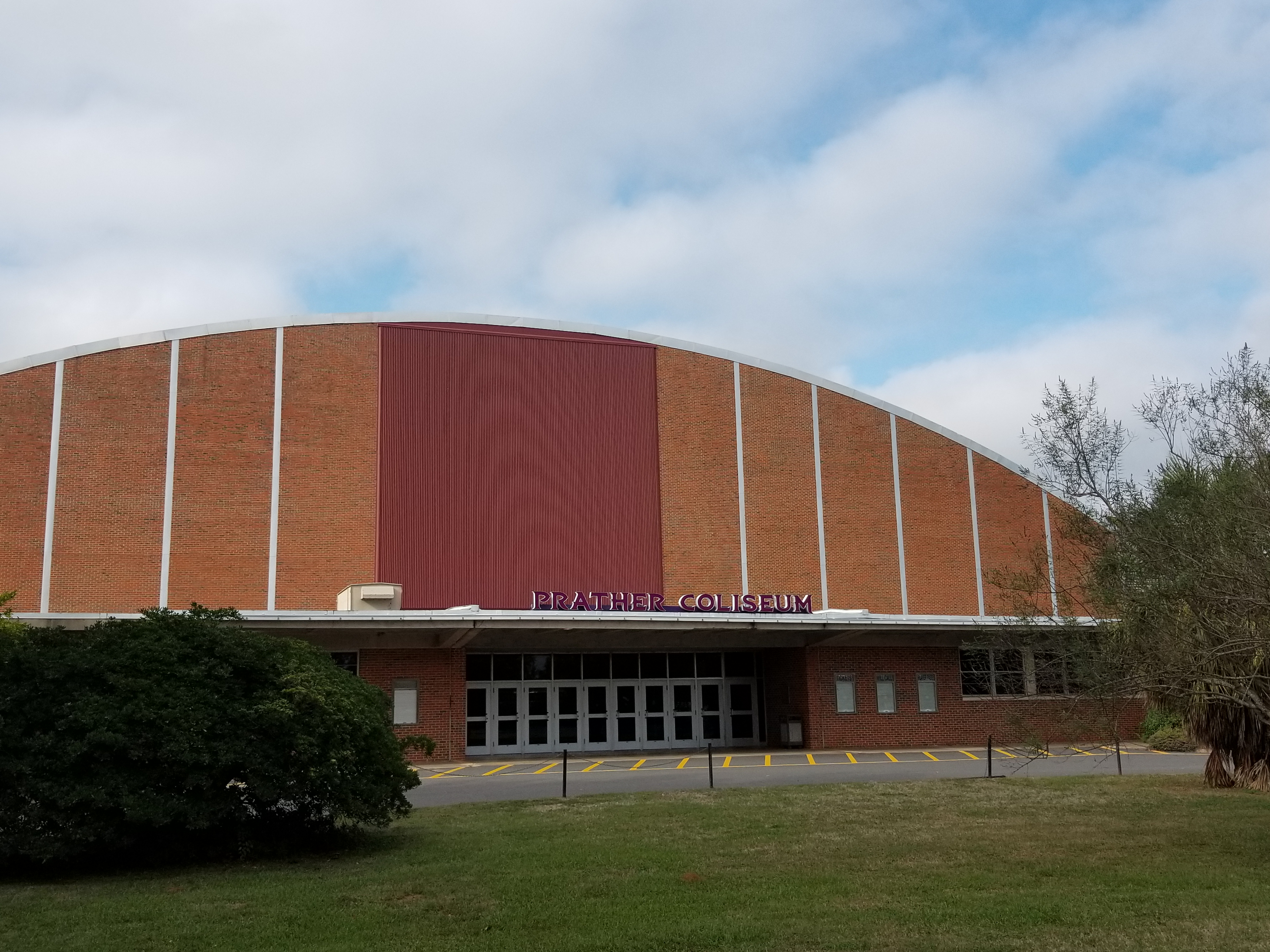
- Interactive map of Prather Coliseum
- Location: 220 S. Jefferson St., Natchitoches, LA 71457
- Coordinates: 31°44′38.5″N 93°05′42.6″W
- Owner: Northwestern State University
- Operator: Northwestern State University
- Capacity: 3,900
- Surface: Multi-surface

Construction
- Opened: 1964

Tenants
- Northwestern State Demons basketball Northwestern State Lady Demons basketball Northwestern State Lady Demons volleyball

Prather Coliseum is a 3,900-seat multi-purpose arena in Natchitoches, Louisiana, United States. It opened in 1964 and is home to the Northwestern State University Demons basketball team. The arena also holds concerts and events. It was named in honor of the school's most successful basketball and football coach, H. Lee Prather, who served from the 1910s through the 1940s before becoming NSU President in 1951.

== History ==
The coliseum is among projects credited to the late State Senator Sylvan Friedman of Natchitoches Parish. It opened two years before Friedman's retirement.

Prather Coliseum is also known as the venue for the final concert performed by rock star Jim Croce on Thursday, September 20, 1973. Shortly after the concert, Croce's plane crashed shortly after takeoff from Natchitoches Regional Airport, killing him and all others aboard the plane.

The arena hosted the Southland Conference men's basketball tournament in 2005–06. Loyola University New Orleans women's basketball player Keiva Council set the single-game scoring record in the building with 48 points in an 84–80 Wolfpack victory over Northwestern State on November 25, 2011.

== See also ==
- List of NCAA Division I basketball arenas
- List of music venues
