= 2017–18 Abilene Christian Wildcats women's basketball team =

Intercollegiate basketball season

2017–18 Abilene Christian Wildcats women's basketball
- Conference: Southland Conference
- Record: 16–14 (9–9 Southland)
- Head coach: Julie Goodenough (6th season)
- Assistant coaches: Erika Lambert; Kyle Felan; Erik Deroo
- Home arena: Moody Coliseum

2017–18 Southland Conference women's basketball standings
	Conf.				Overall
Team	W		L	PCT	W		L	PCT
Lamar	17	–	1	.944	22	–	7	.759
Stephen F. Austin	16	–	2	.889	25	–	6	.806
Central Arkansas	14	–	4	.778	25	–	10	.714
Texas A&M-CC	11	–	7	.611	19	–	12	.613
Nicholls State †	11	–	7	.611	19	–	13	.594
New Orleans	11	–	7	.611	15	–	15	.500
Abilene Christian	9	–	9	.500	16	–	14	.533
McNeese State	8	–	10	.444	12	–	18	.400
Southeastern Louisiana	7	–	11	.389	8	–	21	.276
Houston Baptist	6	–	12	.333	10	–	18	.357
Incarnate Word	4	–	14	.222	5	–	24	.172
Northwestern State	2	–	16	.111	7	–	22	.241
Sam Houston State	1	–	17	.056	4	–	23	.148
† 2018 Southland tournament winner Rankings from AP poll

The 2017–18 Abilene Christian Wildcats women's basketball team represented Abilene Christian University during the 2017–18 NCAA Division I women's basketball season. The Wildcats, led by sixth-year head coach Julie Goodenough, played their home games at the Moody Coliseum in Abilene, Texas. They finished the season 16–14, 9–9 in Southland play, to finish in seventh place. They advanced to the quarterfinals of the Southland women's tournament, where they lost to Central Arkansas.

== Previous season ==
The Wildcats finished the 2016–17 season 23–9 overall and 16–2 in conference play. They shared the Southland Conference regular-season championship with Central Arkansas. The Wildcats, in their fourth and final year of transition from NCAA Division I to NCAA Division II, were ineligible to participate in the Southland Conference tournament and the NCAA Division I women's tournament. They were selected to participate in the WNIT, winning against Oklahoma State and losing to SMU.

== Roster ==
2017–18 Abilene Christian Wildcats women's basketball team
Players
Coaches

Pos.	#	Name	Height	Year	Previous school	Hometown
G/F	3	Dominique Golightly	5 ft 11 in (1.8 m)	So	Chickasha HS	Chickasha, OK
G	10	Breanna Wright	5 ft 8 in (1.73 m)	So	Jarrell HS	Jarrell, TX
G	11	Sara Williamson	5 ft 10 in (1.78 m)	Jr	Rockwall HS	Rowlett, TX
G	12	Josie Larson	5 ft 9 in (1.75 m)	Fr	Johnson HS	San Antonio, TX
C	13	Taudenciah Oluoch	6 ft 3 in (1.91 m)	Sr	Shimba Hills HS	Nairobi, Kenya
G	14	Pamela Herrara	5 ft 6 in (1.68 m)	So	Bel Air HS	El Paso, TX
G	21	Kayla Galindo	5 ft 4 in (1.63 m)	Fr	Riverside HS	El Paso, TX
F/C	22	Sierra Allen	6 ft 1 in (1.85 m)	Sr	Roscoe Highland HS	Roscoe, TX
C	25	Lexi Kirgan	6 ft 4 in (1.93 m)	So	Bullard HS	Bullard, TX
F/C	32	Makayla Mabry	6 ft 1 in (1.85 m)	Fr	Incarnate Word HS	San Antonio, TX
F/C	33	Alyssa Adams	6 ft 1 in (1.85 m)	Fr	Johnson HS	San Antonio, TX
F	44	Lexie Ducat	6 ft 1 in (1.85 m)	Jr	Brock HS	Brock, TX

Head coach

- Julie Goodenough (Abilene Christian)

Assistant coach(es)

- Erika Lambert (College of Charleston)
- Kyle Felan (Texas A&M)
- Erik DeRoo (Fresno State)
- Drew Cole (Aurora)

Legend

- (C) Team captain
- (S) Suspended
- (I) Ineligible
- (W) Walk-on
- Injured
- Current redshirt

Roster
Last update: September 16, 2024

== Schedule ==
Date time, TV	Rank^{#}	Opponent^{#}	Result	Record	Site (attendance) city, state
Non-conference regular season
November 10, 2017*; 5:30 p.m.		Southwest	W 91–47	1–0	Moody Coliseum (1,007); Abilene, TX
November 13, 2017*; 7:00 p.m.		Schreiner	W 97–48	2–0	Moody Coliseum (1,043); Abilene, TX
November 18, 2017*; 2:00 p.m.		Idaho	W 82–72	3–0	Moody Coliseum (1,182); Abilene, TX
November 21, 2017*; 7:00 p.m.		at SMU	L 44–65	3–1	Moody Coliseum (960); Dallas, TX
November 29, 2017*; 7:00 p.m.		at Arkansas	L 65–79	3–2	Bud Walton Arena (1,132); Fayetteville, AR
December 3, 2017*; 2:00 p.m.		Florida Gulf Coast	L 55–94	3–3	Moody Coliseum (1,103); Abilene, TX
December 9, 2017*; 2:00 p.m.		Howard Payne	W 88–46	4–3	Moody Coliseum (1,225); Abilene, TX
December 16, 2017*; 2:00 p.m.		Midwestern State	W 88–67	5–3	Moody Coliseum (1,016); Abilene, TX
December 21, 2017*; 2:00 p.m.		vs. Radford; Las Vegas Holiday Hoops Classic	L 65–71	5–4	South Point Arena (123); Las Vegas, NV
December 22, 2017*; 4:15 p.m.		vs. Old Dominion; Las Vegas Holiday Hoops Classic	W 74–60	6–4	South Point Arena (123); Las Vegas, NV
Southland regular season
December 28, 2017; 2:00 p.m.		New Orleans	W 80–70	7–4 (1–0)	Moody Coliseum (1,028); Abilene, TX
December 30, 2017; 2:00 p.m.		Sam Houston State	W 83–65	8–4 (2–0)	Moody Coliseum (1,030); Abilene, TX
January 3, 2018; 6:30 p.m.		at McNeese State	W 80–75	9–4 (3–0)	Burton Coliseum (850); Lake Charles, LA
January 6, 2018; 2:00 p.m.		Southeastern Louisiana	W 86–80	10–4 (4–0)	Moody Coliseum (1,068); Abilene, TX
January 10, 2018; 7:00 p.m.		Houston Baptist	W 80–68	11–4 (5–0)	Moody Coliseum (1,018); Abilene, TX
January 13, 2018; 7:00 p.m.		Northwestern State	W 80–41	12–4 (6–0)	Moody Coliseum (1,013); Abilene, TX
January 17, 2018; 7:00 p.m., ESPN3		at Stephen F. Austin	L 55–66	12–5 (6–1)	William R. Johnson Coliseum (1,761); Nacogdoches, TX
January 20, 2018; 1:00 p.m., ESPN3		at Central Arkansas	L 45–63	12–6 (6–2)	Farris Center (742); Conway, AR
January 24, 2018; 7:00 p.m.		Texas A&M–Corpus Christi	W 61–59	13–6 (7–2)	Moody Coliseum (1,042); Abilene, TX
January 31, 2018; 7:00 p.m., ESPN3		at Lamar	L 71–77	13–7 (7–3)	Montagne Center (544); Beaumont, TX
February 3, 2018; 3:00 p.m., ESPN3		at Sam Houston State	W 75–72	14–7 (8–3)	Bernard Johnson Coliseum (1,078); Huntsville, TX
February 7, 2018; 6:00 p.m.		at Nicholls State	L 60–81	14–8 (8–4)	Stopher Gym (202); Thibodaux, LA
February 10, 2018; 2:00 p.m.		Incarnate Word	W 58–56	15–8 (9–4)	Moody Coliseum (1,029); Abilene, TX
February 17, 2018; 2:00 p.m.		at Southeastern Louisiana	L 76–78	15–9 (9–5)	University Center (790); Hammond, LA
February 21, 2018; 7:00 p.m.		at Texas A&M–Corpus Christi	L 51–70	15–10 (9–6)	Dugan Wellness Center (776); Corpus Christi, TX
February 24, 2018; 2:00 p.m.		Central Arkansas	L 61–73	15–11 (9–7)	Moody Coliseum (1,450); Abilene, TX
February 28, 2018; 7:00 p.m.		Stephen F. Austin	L 52–78	15–12 (9–8)	Moody Coliseum (1,228); Abilene, TX
March 3, 2018; 1:00 p.m.		at Incarnate Word	L 46–58	15–13 (9–9)	McDermott Center (1,788); San Antonio, TX
Southland women's tournament
March 8, 2018; 1:30 p.m., ESPN3	(7)	vs. (6) New Orleans; First round	W 88–66	16–13	Merrell Center (712); Katy, TX
March 9, 2018; 1:30 p.m., ESPN3	(7)	vs. (3) Central Arkansas; Quarterfinals	L 41–54	16–14	Merrell Center (606); Katy, TX
*Non-conference game. ^{#}Rankings from AP poll. (#) Tournament seedings in parentheses. All times are in Central.

== See also ==
- 2017–18 Abilene Christian Wildcats men's basketball team
