= 2017–18 Stephen F. Austin Ladyjacks basketball team =

Intercollegiate basketball season

2017–18 Stephen F. Austin Ladyjacks basketball

WNIT, First round
- Conference: Southland Conference
- Record: 25–7 (16–2 Southland)
- Head coach: Mark Kellogg (3rd season)
- Assistant coaches: Jessica Grayson; Rebecca Alvidrez; Leonard Bishop
- Home arena: William R. Johnson Coliseum

2017–18 Southland Conference women's basketball standings
	Conf.				Overall
Team	W		L	PCT	W		L	PCT
Lamar	17	–	1	.944	22	–	7	.759
Stephen F. Austin	16	–	2	.889	25	–	6	.806
Central Arkansas	14	–	4	.778	25	–	10	.714
Texas A&M-CC	11	–	7	.611	19	–	12	.613
Nicholls State †	11	–	7	.611	19	–	13	.594
New Orleans	11	–	7	.611	15	–	15	.500
Abilene Christian	9	–	9	.500	16	–	14	.533
McNeese State	8	–	10	.444	12	–	18	.400
Southeastern Louisiana	7	–	11	.389	8	–	21	.276
Houston Baptist	6	–	12	.333	10	–	18	.357
Incarnate Word	4	–	14	.222	5	–	24	.172
Northwestern State	2	–	16	.111	7	–	22	.241
Sam Houston State	1	–	17	.056	4	–	23	.148
† 2018 Southland tournament winner Rankings from AP poll

The 2017–18 Stephen F. Austin Ladyjacks basketball team represented Stephen F. Austin University during the 2017–18 NCAA Division I women's basketball season. The Ladyjacks were led by third-year head coach Mark Kellogg and played their home games at the William R. Johnson Coliseum. They were members of the Southland Conference. They ended the season 25–7, 12–6 in Southland play, to finish in second place. They advanced to the championship game of the Southland women's tournament where they lost to Nicholls State. They received an at-large bid to the WNIT where they lost in the first round to George Mason.

== Previous season ==
The Ladyjacks finished the 2016–17 season with and overall record of 25–8 and 14–4 in Southland play to finish in fourth place. They lost in the finals of the Southland women's tournament to Central Arkansas. The Ladyjacks were invited to the WBI, but lost in the first round to UT Rio Grande Valley.

== Roster ==
2017–18 Stephen F. Austin Lumberjacks women's basketball team
Players
Coaches

Pos.	#	Name	Height	Year	Previous school	Hometown
G	1	Brioenne Burns	5 ft 11 in (1.8 m)	Fr	William Chrisman HS	Independence, MO
G	2	Alyssa Mayfield	5 ft 11 in (1.8 m)	Fr	John Tyler HS	Tyler, TX
G	3	Chanell Hayes	5 ft 11 in (1.8 m)	Jr	Texas HS	Texarkana, AR
G	4	Kennedy Harris	5 ft 8 in (1.73 m)	Jr	Anderson HS	Austin, TX
G	5	Lovisa Brunnberg	5 ft 10 in (1.78 m)	So	BG Lulea	Stockholm, Sweden
F	12	Kia Fisher	6 ft 2 in (1.88 m)	Jr	Århus Statsgymnasium; Panola College	Aarhus, Denmark
G	14	Marissa Banfield	5 ft 8 in (1.73 m)	Fr	Westbury Christian HS	Friendswood, TX
F	21	Stevi Parker	6 ft 0 in (1.83 m)	RS Sr	Bixby HS; Tulsa	Bixby, OK
F	22	Taylor Jackson	6 ft 0 in (1.83 m)	Sr	Frisco Heritage HS; Collin College	Frisco, TX
F	23	Riley Harvey	6 ft 0 in (1.83 m)	So	Howe HS	Howe, TX
F	32	Imani Johnson	6 ft 0 in (1.83 m)	RS Jr	Lee's Summit North HS; Southeast Missouri State	Lee's Summit, MO
C	33	Aaliyah Johnson	6 ft 2 in (1.88 m)	Fr	Lee's Summit North HS	Lee's Summit, MO

Head coach

- Mark Kellogg (Austin College)

Assistant coach(es)

- Rebecca Alvidrez (Montana State)
- Jessica Grayson (Austin Peay)
- Leonard Bishop (East Texas A&M)

Legend

- (C) Team captain
- (S) Suspended
- (I) Ineligible
- (W) Walk-on
- Injured
- Current redshirt

Roster
Last update: April 3, 2024

== Schedule ==
Date time, TV	Rank^{#}	Opponent^{#}	Result	Record	Site (attendance) city, state
Non-conference regular season
November 10, 2017*; 5:30 pm		at Kansas State	L 49–74	0–1	Bramlage Coliseum (3,838); Manhattan, KS
November 14*; 7:00 pm, ESPN3		Coppin State	W 72–59	1–1	William R. Johnson Coliseum (1,289); Nacogdoches, TX
November 18*; 1:30 pm		Howard Payne	W 105–35	2–1	William R. Johnson Coliseum (581); Nacogdoches, TX
November 24*; 8:00 pm		vs. Alabama State; Lady Eagle Thanksgiving Classic	W 77–50	3–1	Reed Green Coliseum (1,159); Hattiesburg, MS
November 25*; 2:00 pm		vs. Alcorn State; Lady Eagle Thanksgiving Classic	W 83–79 ^{OT}	4–1	Reed Green Coliseum (1,100); Hattiesburg, MS
November 28*; 5:00 pm, ESPN3		Central Baptist College	W 97–34	5–1	William R. Johnson Coliseum (732); Nacogdoches, TX
December 2*; 1:00 pm		South Dakota	W 77–55	6–1	William R. Johnson Coliseum (1,465); Nacogdoches, TX
December 7*; 8:00 pm		at Montana	L 52–60	6–2	Dahlberg Arena (2,578); Missoula, MT
December 9*; 4:30 pm		at Montana State	L 54–59 ^{OT}	6–3	Brick Breeden Fieldhouse (1,371); Bozeman, MT
December 16*; 8:00 pm		Texas A&M–Commerce	W 83–61	7–3	William R. Johnson Coliseum (1,070); Nacogdoches, TX
December 19*; 11:00 am, ESPN3		Central Christian College	W 105–32	8–3	William R. Johnson Coliseum (2,721); Nacogdoches, TX
Southland Conference regular season
December 28; 7:00 pm, ESPN3		Southeastern Louisiana	W 79–67	9–3 (1–0)	William R. Johnson Coliseum (998); Nacogdoches, TX
January 3, 2018; 6:00 pm		at Nicholls	W 86–73	10–3 (2–0)	Stopher Gym (133); Thibodaux, LA
January 6; 12:30 pm		at Northwestern State	W 70–62	11–3 (3–0)	Prather Coliseum (1,032); Natchitoches, LA
January 10; 7:00 pm		at New Orleans	W 74–67	12–3 (4–0)	Lakefront Arena (110); New Orleans, LA
January 13; 3:30 pm		Incarnate Word	W 60–49	13–3 (5–0)	William R. Johnson Coliseum (110); Nacogdoches, TX
January 17; 7:00 pm, ESPN3		Abilene Christian	W 66–55	14–3 (6–0)	William R. Johnson Coliseum (1,761); Nacogdoches, TX
January 24; 7:00 pm		Central Arkansas	W 59–46	15–3 (7–0)	William R. Johnson Coliseum (1,103); Nacogdoches, TX
January 27; 3:30 pm		Sam Houston State	W 75–53	16–3 (8–0)	William R. Johnson Coliseum (4,182); Nacogdoches, TX
January 31; 7:00 pm		at Houston Baptist	W 76–54	17–3 (9–0)	Sharp Gym (867); Houston, TX
February 3; 2:00 pm, ESPN3		at Lamar	L 65–79	17–4 (9–1)	Montagne Center (951); Beaumont, TX
February 7; 7:00 pm, ESPN3		McNeese	W 73–58	18–4 (10–1)	William R. Johnson Coliseum (1,091); Nacogdoches, TX
February 10; 3:30 pm, ESPN3		Northwestern State	W 83–48	19–4 (11–1)	William R. Johnson Coliseum (3,563); Nacogdoches, TX
February 14; 7:00 pm, ESPN3		Texas A&M–Corpus Christi	W 59–58	20–4 (12–1)	William R. Johnson Coliseum (1,116); Nacogdoches, TX
February 17; 1:00 pm		at Incarnate Word	W 75–50	21–4 (13–1)	McDermott Center (589); San Antonio, TX
February 21; 7:00 pm		at Central Arkansas	W 55–50	22–4 (14–1)	Farris Center (428); Conway, AR
February 24; 3:30 pm, ESPN3		Lamar	L 58–75	22–5 (14–2)	William R. Johnson Coliseum (4,221); Nacogdoches, TX
February 28; 7:00 pm		at Abilene Christian	W 78–52	23–5 (15–2)	Moody Coliseum (1,228); Abilene, TX
March 3; 4:30 pm		at Sam Houston State	W 72–49	24–5 (16–2)	Bernard Johnson Coliseum (375); Huntsville, TX
Southland women's tournament
March 10; 3:30 pm, ESPN3	(2)	vs. (3) Central Arkansas; Semifinals	W 70–60	25–5	Merrell Center (1,446); Katy, TX
March 11; 12:00 pm, CBSSN	(2)	vs. (4) Nicholls; Championship	L 65–69	25–6	Merrell Center (927); Katy, TX
WNIT
March 16*; 6:00 pm		at George Mason; First Round	L 65–69	25–7	EagleBank Arena (802); Fairfax, VA
*Non-conference game. ^{#}Rankings from AP poll. (#) Tournament seedings in parentheses. All times are in Central Time.

== See also ==
- 2017–18 Stephen F. Austin Lumberjacks basketball team
