= 2017–18 Texas A&M–Corpus Christi Islanders women's basketball team =

Intercollegiate basketball season

2017–18 Texas A&M–Corpus Christi Islanders women's basketball
- Conference: Southland Conference
- Record: 19–12 (11–7 Southland)
- Head coach: Royce Chadwick (6th season)
- Assistant coaches: Roxanne White; Darren Brunson; Jasmine Shaw
- Home arena: American Bank Center; Dugan Wellness Center

2017–18 Southland Conference women's basketball standings
	Conf.				Overall
Team	W		L	PCT	W		L	PCT
Lamar	17	–	1	.944	22	–	7	.759
Stephen F. Austin	16	–	2	.889	25	–	6	.806
Central Arkansas	14	–	4	.778	25	–	10	.714
Texas A&M-CC	11	–	7	.611	19	–	12	.613
Nicholls State †	11	–	7	.611	19	–	13	.594
New Orleans	11	–	7	.611	15	–	15	.500
Abilene Christian	9	–	9	.500	16	–	14	.533
McNeese State	8	–	10	.444	12	–	18	.400
Southeastern Louisiana	7	–	11	.389	8	–	21	.276
Houston Baptist	6	–	12	.333	10	–	18	.357
Incarnate Word	4	–	14	.222	5	–	24	.172
Northwestern State	2	–	16	.111	7	–	22	.241
Sam Houston State	1	–	17	.056	4	–	23	.148
† 2018 Southland tournament winner Rankings from AP poll

The 2017–18 Texas A&M–Corpus Christi Islanders women's basketball team represented Texas A&M University–Corpus Christi in the 2017–18 NCAA Division I women's basketball season. The Islanders were led by sixth year head coach Royce Chadwick. They played their home games at the American Bank Center and the Dugan Wellness Center and were members of the Southland Conference. They finished the season 19–12, 11–7 in Southland play to finish in a three way tie for fourth place. They advanced to the semifinals of the Southland women's tournament where they lost to Nicholls State.

== Previous season ==
The Islanders finished the season 14–18 overall and 8–10 in Southland play to finish tied for sixth place. They were 2-1 as fifth seed in the Southland women's tournament. Their season ended losing to tournament champion Central Arkansas in the Semifinal round.

== Media ==
Video streaming of all non-televised home games and audio for all road games is available at GoIslanders.com.

== Roster ==
2017–18 Texas A&M–Corpus Christi Islanders women's basketball team
Players
Coaches

Pos.	#	Name	Height	Year	Previous school	Hometown
F	1	Giana Wright	5 ft 11 in (1.8 m)	Fr	Castro Valley HS	Castro Valley, CA
G	2	Tiara Davenport	6 ft 0 in (1.83 m)	Jr	Duncanville HS; Louisiana Tech	Dallas, TX
G	4	Heaven Thompson	5 ft 6 in (1.68 m)	Fr	Bolton HS	Memphis, TN
F	5	Uri Jolivette	5 ft 10 in (1.78 m)	Jr	New Iberia Central HS	New Iberia, LA
G	10	Brianna Jackson	5 ft 6 in (1.68 m)	Sr	Northside HS; Independence College	Fort Smith, AR
G	11	Lajaneira Robinson	5 ft 7 in (1.7 m)	So	Odessa JC	Houston, TX
G	12	Dae Dae Evans	5 ft 7 in (1.7 m)	So	Bellaire HS	Bellaire, TX
G	15	Brittany Mbamalu	5 ft 8 in (1.73 m)	RS Sr	Dulles HS	Houston, TX
F	20	Kre'ana Henry	5 ft 11 in (1.8 m)	RS Sr	Waite HS; Moberly Area CC	Toledo, OH
G	21	Emma Young	5 ft 10 in (1.78 m)	So	East Jessamine HS	Nicholasville, KY
G	22	Dalesia Booth	5 ft 9 in (1.75 m)	So	Cole HS	San Antonio, TX
G	23	Laderica Paul	5 ft 8 in (1.73 m)	So	Skyline HS; UMKC	Dallas, TX
G	24	Tasia Foman (redshirt)	5 ft 8 in (1.73 m)	Sr	Duncanville HS; Texas	Duncanville, TX
F	25	Melissa Lockridge	6 ft 0 in (1.83 m)	Fr		San Antonio, TX
G	30	Sydney-Anne Cotrell	5 ft 4 in (1.63 m)	RS So	William B. Travis HS	Sugar Land, TX
F	34	Tiara Matthews	5 ft 11 in (1.8 m)	So	Fort Bend Kemper HS	Sugar Land, TX
F	42	K'neshia Bush	5 ft 11 in (1.8 m)	Fr	Terry Parker HS	Jacksonville, FL

Head coach

- Royce Chadwick (Southwestern Oklahoma State)

Assistant coach(es)

- Roxanne White (Stephen F. Austin)
- Darren Brunson (St. Mary's (TX))
- Jasmine Shaw (Marshall)

Legend

- (C) Team captain
- (S) Suspended
- (I) Ineligible
- (W) Walk-on
- Injured
- Current redshirt

Roster
Last update: March 5, 2018

== Schedule and results ==
Date time, TV	Rank^{#}	Opponent^{#}	Result	Record	Site (attendance) city, state
Non-conference regular season
November 10, 2017*; 5:00 pm		Texas Lutheran; Texas A&M–Corpus Christi Classic	W 87–56	1–0	Dugan Wellness Center (613); Corpus Christi, TX
November 11*; 7:00 pm		McMurry; Texas A&M–Corpus Christi Classic	W 62–43	2–0	Dugan Wellness Center (679); Corpus Christi, TX
November 14*; 7:00 pm		at Texas–Rio Grande Valley	L 53–56	2–1	UTRGV Fieldhouse (328); Edinburg, TX
November 18*; 7:00 pm		at UTEP	L 49–69	2–2	Don Haskins Center (536); El Paso, TX
November 20*; 7:00 pm		at New Mexico State	L 61–70	2–3	Pan American Center; Las Cruces, NM
November 25*; 12:00 pm		vs. Prairie View A&M; Feast of Sharing Tournament	W 72–62	3–3	UTRGV Fieldhouse (128); Edinburg, TX
November 26*; 12:00 pm		vs. Florida A&M; Feast of Sharing Tournament	W 58–55	4–3	UTRGV Fieldhouse (102); Edinburg, TX
November 26*; 7:00 pm		Texas–Rio Grande Valley	W 71–41	5–3	Dugan Wellness Center (540); Corpus Christi, TX
December 5*; 7:00 pm		Texas A&M International	W 53–34	6–3	Dugan Wellness Center (542); Corpus Christi, TX
December 18*; 7:00 pm		Rice	L 56–67	6–4	Dugan Wellness Center (331); Corpus Christi, TX
December 20*; 7:00 pm		St. Thomas	W 72–42	7–4	Dugan Wellness Center (362); Corpus Christi, TX
Southland regular season
December 28; 1:00 pm		Central Arkansas	L 50–58	7–5 (0–1)	Dugan Wellness Center (158); Corpus Christi, TX
December 30; 5:00 pm		Lamar	L 31–70	7–6 (0–2)	American Bank Center (2,472); Corpus Christi, TX
January 3, 2018; 6:30 pm		at Northwestern State	W 62–56	8–6 (1–2)	Prather Coliseum (775); Natchitoches, LA
January 10; 6:30 pm		at Sam Houston State	W 67–57	9–6 (2–2)	Bernard Johnson Coliseum (533); Huntsville, TX
January 13; 2:00 pm		at New Orleans	L 49–66	9–7 (2–3)	Lakefront Arena (213); New Orleans, LA
January 17; 7:00 pm		Nicholls	W 76–55	10–7 (3–3)	Dugan Wellness Center (573); Corpus Christi, TX
January 24; 7:00 pm		at Abilene Christian	L 59–61	10–8 (3–4)	Moody Coliseum (1,042); Abilene, TX
January 27; 5:00 pm		Houston Baptist	W 50–49	11–8 (4–4)	American Bank Center; Corpus Christi, TX
January 31; 7:00 pm		Southeastern Louisiana	W 56–52	12–8 (5–4)	Dugan Wellness Center (756); Corpus Christi, TX
February 3; 1:00 pm		at Incarnate Word	W 62–58	13–8 (6–4)	McDermott Center (1,211); San Antonio, TX
February 7; 1:00 pm		Sam Houston State	W 62–48	14–8 (7–4)	Dugan Wellness Center (883); Corpus Christi, TX
February 10; 2:00 pm		New Orleans; Homecoming	W 75–68	15–8 (8–4)	American Bank Center (812); Corpus Christi, TX
February 14; 7:00 pm		at Stephen F. Austin	L 58–59	15–9 (8–5)	William R. Johnson Coliseum (1,116); Nacogdoches, TX
February 17; 2:00 pm		at Lamar	L 59–65	15–10 (8–6)	Montagne Center (1,297); Beaumont, TX
February 21; 7:00 pm		Abilene Christian	W 70–51	16–10 (9–6)	Dugan Wellness Center (776); Corpus Christi, TX
February 24; 11:30 pm		Incarnate Word	W 75–59	17–10 (10–6)	Dugan Wellness Center; Corpus Christi, TX
February 28; 6:30 pm		at McNeese	L 64–70	17–11 (10–7)	Burton Coliseum (711); Lake Charles, LA
March 3; 2:00 pm		at Houston Baptist	W 73–68	18–11 (11–7)	Sharp Gym (632); Houston, TX
Southland Women's Tournament
March 8; 11:00 am, ESPN3	(5)	vs. (8) McNeese; First Round	W 75–52	19–11	Merrell Center; Katy, TX
March 9; 11:00 am, ESPN3	(5)	vs. (4) Nicholls; Quarterfinals	L 59–61	19–12	Merrell Center; Katy, TX
*Non-conference game. ^{#}Rankings from AP Poll. (#) Tournament seedings in parentheses. All times are in Central Time.

== See also ==
2017–18 Texas A&M–Corpus Christi Islanders men's basketball team
