= 2017–18 New Orleans Privateers women's basketball team =

Intercollegiate basketball season

2017–18 New Orleans Privateers women's basketball
- Conference: Southland Conference
- Record: 15–15 (11–7 Southland)
- Head coach: Keeshawn Davenport (7th season)
- Assistant coaches: Wyketha Harrell; Alpha English; Kristin Moore
- Home arena: Lakefront Arena

2017–18 Southland Conference women's basketball standings
	Conf.				Overall
Team	W		L	PCT	W		L	PCT
Lamar	17	–	1	.944	22	–	7	.759
Stephen F. Austin	16	–	2	.889	25	–	6	.806
Central Arkansas	14	–	4	.778	25	–	10	.714
Texas A&M-CC	11	–	7	.611	19	–	12	.613
Nicholls State †	11	–	7	.611	19	–	13	.594
New Orleans	11	–	7	.611	15	–	15	.500
Abilene Christian	9	–	9	.500	16	–	14	.533
McNeese State	8	–	10	.444	12	–	18	.400
Southeastern Louisiana	7	–	11	.389	8	–	21	.276
Houston Baptist	6	–	12	.333	10	–	18	.357
Incarnate Word	4	–	14	.222	5	–	24	.172
Northwestern State	2	–	16	.111	7	–	22	.241
Sam Houston State	1	–	17	.056	4	–	23	.148
† 2018 Southland tournament winner Rankings from AP poll

The 2017–18 New Orleans Privateers women's basketball team represented the University of New Orleans during the 2017–18 NCAA Division I women's basketball season. The Privateers were led by seventh-year head coach Keeshawn Davenport and played their home games at the Lakefront Arena in New Orleans, Louisiana. They were members of the Southland Conference. They finished the season 15–15, 11–7 in Southland play, to finish in a three-way tie for fourth place. They lost in the first round of the Southland women's tournament to Abilene Christian.

== Previous season ==
The Privateers finished the season 14–15 overall and 9–9 in Southland play, to finish in fifth place. Their season ended when they lost in the first round of the Southland women's tournament.

== Roster ==
2017–18 New Orleans Privateers women's basketball team
Players
Coaches

Pos.	#	Name	Height	Year	Previous school	Hometown
F	00	Halie Matthews	6 ft 0 in (1.83 m)	Sr	West Jefferson HS	Harvey, LA
G	1	Jada Duncantell	5 ft 4 in (1.63 m)	Fr	Natchitoches Central HS	Natchitoches, LA
G	3	Dionjhae Thomas	5 ft 6 in (1.68 m)	Fr	Houma Christian HS	Thibodaux, LA
G	10	Danielle Wright	5 ft 7 in (1.7 m)	Jr	Morrilton HS	Morrilton, AR
G	11	Annalise Brisco	5 ft 10 in (1.78 m)	Fr	Clear Falls HS	Houston, TX
C	13	Kayla Thomas	6 ft 5 in (1.96 m)	RS So	Mastery Charter HS; Central Florida	Philadelphia, PA
G	20	Jada Swafford	5 ft 10 in (1.78 m)	So	Union Academy HS	Alexandria, LA
F	21	Whitley Larry	6 ft 1 in (1.85 m)	So	Rayne HS	Rayne, LA
G	22	Randi Brown	5 ft 7 in (1.7 m)	Sr	Central Catholic HS	Houma, LA
G	23	Mariah Wright	5 ft 3 in (1.6 m)	RS Jr	Zachary HS	Zachary, LA
G	24	Katarina Maricic	5 ft 4 in (1.63 m)	Sr	Arizona Western JC	Belgrade, Serbia
G	25	Alyssa Quixley	5 ft 9 in (1.75 m)	So	St. Augustine HS	St. Augustine, FL
C	30	Shania Woods	6 ft 1 in (1.85 m)	Jr	Lutheran HS	Houston, TX
F	31	Asia Woods	6 ft 0 in (1.83 m)	So	Lutheran HS	Houston, TX
G	32	Kayla Mundy	5 ft 8 in (1.73 m)	Sr	Liberty HS	McKinney, TX
C	33	Nicole Hutchins	6 ft 4 in (1.93 m)	Fr	Asquith Girls HS	Berowra, Australia

Head coach

- Keeshawn Davenport (New Orleans)

Assistant coach(es)

- Wyketha Harrell (UMKC)
- Alpha English (San José State)
- Kristin Moore (St. John's)

Legend

- (C) Team captain
- (S) Suspended
- (I) Ineligible
- (W) Walk-on
- Injured
- Current redshirt

Roster
Last update: July 12, 2024

== Schedule ==
Date time, TV	Rank^{#}	Opponent^{#}	Result	Record	Site (attendance) city, state
Non-conference regular season
November 10, 2017*; 7:00 p.m.		at Louisiana; Preseason WNIT first round	L 57–66	0–1	Cajundome (692); Lafayette, LA
November 17*; 7:30 p.m.		Cal State Northridge; Preseason WNIT consolation round	W 76–73	1–1	Lakefront Arena (417); New Orleans, LA
November 18*; 4:30 p.m.		Houston; Preseason WNIT consolation round	L 66–78	1–2	Lakefront Arena (417); New Orleans, LA
November 21*; 4:30 p.m., ACCNX		at Miami (FL)	L 46–76	1–3	Watsco Center (2,005); Coral Gables, FL
November 24*; 7:05 p.m.		at South Alabama	L 45–67	1–4	Mitchell Center (291); Mobile, AL
November 30*; 7:00 p.m.		Jacksonville State	L 54–59	1–5	Lakefront Arena (258); New Orleans, LA
December 2*; 2:00 p.m.		at No. 19 Missouri	L 45–81	1–6	Mizzou Arena (3,345); Columbia, MO
December 5*; 7:00 p.m., CST		at Tulane	L 56–79	1–7	Devlin Fieldhouse (935); New Orleans, LA
December 14*; 11:00 a.m.		Xavier (LA)	W 85–50	2–7	Lakefront Arena (214); New Orleans, LA
December 17*; 2:00 p.m.		at Louisiana–Monroe	W 89–51	3–7	Fant–Ewing Coliseum (710); Monroe, LA
December 21*; 7:00 p.m.		Texas Southern	W 72–69	4–7	Lakefront Arena (221); New Orleans, LA
Southland regular season
December 28; 2:00 p.m.		at Abilene Christian	L 70–80	4–8 (0–1)	Moody Coliseum (1,028); Abilene, TX
December 30; 2:00 p.m.		Houston Baptist	W 70–52	5–8 (1–1)	Lakefront Arena (191); New Orleans, LA
January 3, 2018; 7:00 p.m., ESPN3		at Lamar	L 77–100	5–9 (1–2)	Montagne Center (578); Beaumont, TX
January 6; 1:00 p.m.		at McNeese State	W 77–64	6–9 (2–2)	Burton Coliseum (821); Lake Charles, LA
January 10; 7:00 p.m.		Stephen F. Austin	L 67–74	6–10 (2–3)	Lakefront Arena (110); New Orleans, LA
January 13; 2:00 p.m.		Texas A&M–Corpus Christi	W 66–49	7–10 (3–3)	Lakefront Arena (213); New Orleans, LA
January 17; 7:00 p.m.		at Central Arkansas	W 52–48	8–10 (4–3)	Farris Center (423); Conway, AR
January 20; 4:00 p.m., ESPN3		Incarnate Word	W 52–50	9–10 (5–3)	Lakefront Arena (584); New Orleans, LA
January 24; 7:00 p.m.		Northwestern State	W 81–63	10–10 (6–3)	Lakefront Arena (242); New Orleans, LA
January 27; 11:00 a.m.		at Incarnate Word	W 72–45	11–10 (7–3)	McDermott Center (799); San Antonio, TX
January 31; 6:30 p.m.		at Northwestern State	L 47–52	11–11 (7–4)	Prather Coliseum (510); Natchitoches, LA
February 3; 2:00 p.m.		Nicholls State	L 61–62	11–12 (7–5)	Lakefront Arena (347); New Orleans, LA
February 10; 2:00 p.m., ESPN3		at Texas A&M–Corpus Christi	L 68–75	11–13 (7–6)	American Bank Center (812); Corpus Christi, TX
February 14; 7:00 p.m.		Southeastern Louisiana	W 82–73	12–13 (8–6)	Lakefront Arena (241); New Orleans, LA
February 17; 2:00 p.m.		McNeese State	W 84–62	13–13 (9–6)	Lakefront Arena; New Orleans, LA
February 21; 7:00 p.m.		Sam Houston State	W 77–50	14–13 (10–6)	Lakefront Arena (321); New Orleans, LA
February 24; 4:00 p.m., ESPN3		at Nicholls State	L 48–72	14–14 (10–7)	Stopher Gym (433); Thibodaux, LA
February 28; 7:00 p.m.		at Southeastern Louisiana	W 74–71	15–14 (11–7)	University Center (478); Hammond, LA
Southland women's tournament
March 8; 1:30 p.m., ESPN3	(6)	vs. (7) Abilene Christian; First round	L 66–88	15–15	Merrell Center (712); Katy, TX
*Non-conference game. ^{#}Rankings from AP poll. (#) Tournament seedings in parentheses. All times are in Central.

== See also ==
- 2017–18 New Orleans Privateers men's basketball team
