= 2017–18 McNeese State Cowgirls basketball team =

Intercollegiate basketball season

2017–18 McNeese State Cowgirls basketball
- Conference: Southland Conference
- Record: 12–18 (8–10 Southland)
- Head coach: Kacie Cryer (2nd season)
- Assistant coaches: Edie Higgins; Alaina Verdin; Lindsey Lopez
- Home arena: Burton Coliseum

2017–18 Southland Conference women's basketball standings
	Conf.				Overall
Team	W		L	PCT	W		L	PCT
Lamar	17	–	1	.944	22	–	7	.759
Stephen F. Austin	16	–	2	.889	25	–	6	.806
Central Arkansas	14	–	4	.778	25	–	10	.714
Texas A&M-CC	11	–	7	.611	19	–	12	.613
Nicholls State †	11	–	7	.611	19	–	13	.594
New Orleans	11	–	7	.611	15	–	15	.500
Abilene Christian	9	–	9	.500	16	–	14	.533
McNeese State	8	–	10	.444	12	–	18	.400
Southeastern Louisiana	7	–	11	.389	8	–	21	.276
Houston Baptist	6	–	12	.333	10	–	18	.357
Incarnate Word	4	–	14	.222	5	–	24	.172
Northwestern State	2	–	16	.111	7	–	22	.241
Sam Houston State	1	–	17	.056	4	–	23	.148
† 2018 Southland tournament winner Rankings from AP poll

The 2017–18 McNeese State Cowgirls basketball team represented McNeese State University during the 2017–18 NCAA Division I women's basketball season. The Cowgirls, led by second-year head coach Kacie Cryer, played all their home games at Burton Coliseum. They are members of the Southland Conference.

== Previous season ==
The Cowgirls finished the 2016–17 season with a 14–17 overall record and an 8–10 Southland Conference record to finish in sixth place. They advanced to the quarterfinals of the Southland women's tournament where they lost to Stephen F. Austin.

== Roster ==
2017–18 McNeese State Cowboys women's basketball team
Players
Coaches

Pos.	#	Name	Height	Year	Previous school	Hometown
G	00	Keara Hudnall	6 ft 0 in (1.83 m)	Sr	Pearland HS	Pearland, TX
G	1	Reagan Bolton	5 ft 8 in (1.73 m)	So	St. Thomas Aquinas HS	Hammond, LA
F	2	Bre'Ashlee Jones	5 ft 7 in (1.7 m)	RS Fr	Jewel Sumner HS	Kentwood, LA
G	3	Caitlin Davis	5 ft 7 in (1.7 m)	So	Breaux Bridge HS	Breaux Bridge, LA
G	4	Dede Sheppard	5 ft 8 in (1.73 m)	Sr	North Caddo HS	Vivian, LA
F	5	Jasmine Carswell	6 ft 0 in (1.83 m)	Sr	Airline HS	Bossier, LA
C	13	Cynthia Rivas	6 ft 2 in (1.88 m)	Jr	North Central Texas Academy	Guadalajara, Mexico
G	15	Gabby Guidry	5 ft 8 in (1.73 m)	Sr	Lake Arthur HS	Lake Arthur, LA
F	21	Mercedes Rogers	6 ft 0 in (1.83 m)	Sr	Crowley HS	Crowley, LA

Head coach

- Kacie Cryer (LSU–Shreveport)

Assistant coach(es)

- Edie Higgins (LSU–Shreveport)
- Alaina Verdin (McNeese State)
- Lindsey Lopez (Dominican (NY))

Legend

- (C) Team captain
- (S) Suspended
- (I) Ineligible
- (W) Walk-on
- Injured
- Current redshirt

Roster
Last update: March 6, 2018

== Schedule ==
Date time, TV	Rank^{#}	Opponent^{#}	Result	Record	Site (attendance) city, state
Exhibition
November 7, 2017*; 6:00 pm		Wiley College	W 72–43		Burton Coliseum; Lake Charles, LA
Non-conference regular season
November 12*; 2:00 pm		Southern (N.O.)	W 76–61	1–0	Burton Coliseum (918); Lake Charles, LA
November 15*; 11:00 am, LHN		at No. 2 Texas	L 34–100	1–1	Frank Erwin Center (7,651); Austin, TX
November 19*; 2:00 pm		LSU–Alexandria	W 73–53	2–1	Burton Coliseum (801); Lake Charles, LA
November 22*; 1:00 pm		Grambling	L 60–75	2–2	Burton Coliseum (796); Lake Charles, LA
November 26*; 2:00 pm		Louisiana–Monroe	W 65–61	3–2	Burton Coliseum (751); Lake Charles, LA
November 29*; 7:00 pm		Tulane	L 66–70	3–3	Burton Coliseum (729); Lake Charles, LA
December 3*; 5:00 pm, CST		at Louisiana	L 86–98 ^{3OT}	3–4	Cajundome (753); Lafayette, LA
December 11*; 6:00 pm		Louisiana College	W 84–46	4–4	Burton Coliseum (791); Lake Charles, LA
December 13*; 6:30 pm, FSSW		at No. 6 Baylor	L 34–95	4–5	Ferrell Center (6,583); Waco, TX
December 18*; 12:00 pm		at Louisiana Tech	L 62–78	4–6	Thomas Assembly Center (1,823); Ruston, LA
December 22*; 1:00 pm		at SMU	L 59–65	4–7	Moody Coliseum (691); Dallas, TX
Southland regular season
December 28; 6:00 pm		at Incarnate Word	W 66–57	5–7 (1–0)	McDermott Center (356); San Antonio, TX
December 30; 1:00 pm		Northwestern State	W 72–67	6–7 (2–0)	Burton Coliseum (782); Lake Charles, LA
January 3, 2018; 6:30 pm		Abilene Christian	L 75–80	6–8 (2–1)	Burton Coliseum (850); Lake Charles, LA
January 6; 1:00 pm		New Orleans	L 64–77	6–9 (2–2)	Burton Coliseum (821); Lake Charles, LA
January 10; 6:30 pm		Nicholls State	L 54–61	6–10 (2–3)	Burton Coliseum (727); Lake Charles, LA
January 13; 2:00 pm		at Southeastern Louisiana	W 77–65	7–10 (3–3)	University Center (579); Hammond, LA
January 20; 2:00 pm		at Houston Baptist	W 86–74	8–10 (4–3)	Sharp Gym (478); Houston, TX
January 27; 2:00 pm, ESPN3		at Lamar	L 58–83	8–11 (4–4)	Montagne Center (955); Beaumont, TX
January 31; 6:30 pm, ESPN3		at Sam Houston State	W 66–63	9–11 (5–4)	Bernard Johnson Coliseum (759); Huntsville, TX
February 3; 1:00 pm, ESPN3		at Northwestern State	W 60–44	10–11 (6–4)	Prather Coliseum (1,001); Natchitoches, LA
February 7; 7:00 pm, ESPN3		at Stephen F. Austin	L 48–83	10–12 (6–5)	William R. Johnson Coliseum (1,091); Nacogdoches, TX
February 10; 1:00 pm		Southeastern Louisiana	W 69–47	11–12 (7–5)	Burton Coliseum (539); Lake Charles, LA
February 14; 6:30 pm		Central Arkansas	L 45–51	11–13 (7–6)	Burton Coliseum (767); Lake Charles, LA
February 17; 2:00 pm		at New Orleans	L 62–84	11–14 (7–7)	Lakefront Arena; New Orleans, LA
February 21; 6:00 pm		at Nicholls State	L 51–63	11–15 (7–8)	Stopher Gym (202); Thibodaux, LA
February 24; 2:00 pm		Houston Baptist	L 61–67 ^{OT}	11–16 (7–9)	Burton Coliseum (717); Lake Charles, LA
February 28; 6:30 pm		Texas A&M–Corpus Christi	W 70–64	12–16 (8–9)	Burton Coliseum (711); Lake Charles, LA
March 3; 1:00 pm		Lamar	L 72–81	12–17 (8–10)	Burton Coliseum (983); Lake Charles, LA
Southland Tournament
March 8; 11:00 am, ESPN3	(8)	vs. (5) Texas A&M–Corpus Christi; First Round	L 52–75	12–18	Merrell Center; Katy, TX
*Non-conference game. ^{#}Rankings from AP Poll. (#) Tournament seedings in parentheses. All times are in Central Time.

== See also ==
2017–18 McNeese State Cowboys basketball team
