= 2017–18 Nicholls State Colonels women's basketball team =

Intercollegiate basketball season

2017–18 Nicholls State Colonels women's basketball

Southland Tournament Champions

NCAA tournament, first round
- Conference: Southland Conference
- Record: 19–13 (11–7 Southland)
- Head coach: DoBee Plaisance (10th season)
- Assistant coaches: Justin Payne; Kris Goff; Jenny Nash
- Home arena: Stopher Gym

2017–18 Southland Conference women's basketball standings
	Conf.				Overall
Team	W		L	PCT	W		L	PCT
Lamar	17	–	1	.944	22	–	7	.759
Stephen F. Austin	16	–	2	.889	25	–	6	.806
Central Arkansas	14	–	4	.778	25	–	10	.714
Texas A&M-CC	11	–	7	.611	19	–	12	.613
Nicholls State †	11	–	7	.611	19	–	13	.594
New Orleans	11	–	7	.611	15	–	15	.500
Abilene Christian	9	–	9	.500	16	–	14	.533
McNeese State	8	–	10	.444	12	–	18	.400
Southeastern Louisiana	7	–	11	.389	8	–	21	.276
Houston Baptist	6	–	12	.333	10	–	18	.357
Incarnate Word	4	–	14	.222	5	–	24	.172
Northwestern State	2	–	16	.111	7	–	22	.241
Sam Houston State	1	–	17	.056	4	–	23	.148
† 2018 Southland tournament winner Rankings from AP poll

The 2017–18 Nicholls State Colonels women's basketball team represented Nicholls State University during the 2017–18 NCAA Division I women's basketball season. The Colonels, led by tenth year head coach DoBee Plaisance, played their home games at Stopher Gym and were members of the Southland Conference. They finished the season 19–13, 11–7 in Southland play to finish in a three-way tie for fourth place. They won their first Southland women's tournament and earned an automatic trip to their first NCAA women's tournament in school history, where they lost in the first round to Mississippi State.

== Previous season ==
The Colonels finished the season 10–20 overall and 7–11 in Southland play a three-way tie for eighth place. They lost in the first round of the Southland women's tournament to McNeese State.

== Roster ==
2017–18 Nicholls State Colonels women's basketball team
Players
Coaches

Pos.	#	Name	Height	Year	Previous school	Hometown
G	0	Tykeria Williams	5 ft 6 in (1.68 m)	So	Lee HS	Montgomery, AL
G	1	Bree Wilson	5 ft 4 in (1.63 m)	So	St. Michael HS	New Orleans, LA
G	3	Tia Charles	5 ft 6 in (1.68 m)	Sr	John Curtis HS	New Orleans, LA
G	5	Airi Hamilton	5 ft 8 in (1.73 m)	RS So	Ponchatoula HS	Natchitoches, LA
G	13	Kinzie Hieneman	5 ft 7 in (1.7 m)	Fr	Brennan HS	San Antonio, TX
F	15	Lauryn Bowie	5 ft 9 in (1.75 m)	Fr	Duncanville HS	Duncanville, TX
G	20	Cassidy Barrios	5 ft 10 in (1.78 m)	Jr	Vandebilt Catholic HS	Raceland, LA
F	21	Paige Williams	5 ft 11 in (1.8 m)	RS Fr	Edna Karr HS	New Orleans, LA
C	23	Korie Leary	5 ft 10 in (1.78 m)	RS Fr	Lincoln HS	Dallas, TX
F	25	Katherine Ward	5 ft 9 in (1.75 m)	Jr	Terrebonne HS; Delgado CC	Houma, LA
G	32	Destiny Collins	5 ft 10 in (1.78 m)	Fr	Edna Karr HS	New Orleans, LA
F	33	Bryanna Washington	5 ft 9 in (1.75 m)	Fr	Ranchview HS	Irving, TX
C	40	Marina Lilly	6 ft 3 in (1.91 m)	RS Sr	Skyline HS	Dallas, TX

Head coach

- DoBee Plaisance (Southern Miss)

Assistant coach(es)

- Justin Payne (Nicholls State)
- Kris Goff (Southeastern Louisiana)
- Jenny Nash (Nicholls State)

Legend

- (C) Team captain
- (S) Suspended
- (I) Ineligible
- (W) Walk-on
- Injured
- Current redshirt

Roster
Last update: March 5, 2018

== Schedule ==
Date time, TV	Rank^{#}	Opponent^{#}	Result	Record	Site (attendance) city, state
Non-conference regular season
November 10, 2017*; 11:30 am		at SMU	L 61–68	0–1	Moody Coliseum (1,368); Dallas, TX
November 14*; 6:00 pm		Spring Hill College	W 78–70	1–1	Stopher Gym (466); Thibodaux, LA
November 14*; 6:00 pm		Jacksonville	L 61–69	1–2	Stopher Gym (301); Thibodaux, LA
November 21*; 7:00 pm		at LSU	L 50–65	1–3	Maravich Center (1,665); Baton Rouge, LA
November 24*; 1:00 pm		vs. Bradley; SEMO Thanksgiving Classic	L 65–75	1–4	Show Me Center (215); Cape Girardeau, MO
November 25*; 1:00 pm		vs. Evangel; SEMO Thanksgiving Classic	W 72–55	2–4	Show Me Center (142); Cape Girardeau, MO
November 29*; 11:30 pm		SUNO	W 83–45	3–4	Stopher Gym (1,214); Thibodaux, LA
December 2*; 3:00 pm		at Jackson State	W 90–64	4–4	Williams Assembly Center (250); Jackson, MS
December 15*; 3:00 pm		at Mississippi Valley State	W 62–57	5–4	Harrison HPER Complex (432); Itta Bena, MS
December 18*; 7:00 pm, ELVN		No. 6 Baylor	L 43–85	5–5	Stopher Gym (1,034); Thibodaux, LA
December 21*; 1:00 pm		at Iowa State	L 47–75	5–6	Hilton Coliseum (9,466); Ames, IA
Southland regular season
December 28; 6:30 pm		at Northwestern State	W 79–63	6–6 (1–0)	Prather Coliseum (717); Natchitoches, LA
December 30; 1:00 pm		at Incarnate Word	L 62–64	6–7 (1–1)	McDermott Center (352); San Antonio, TX
January 3, 2018; 6:00 pm		Stephen F. Austin	L 73–86	6–8 (1–2)	Stopher Gym (133); Thibodaux, LA
January 6; 2:00 pm		at Houston Baptist	W 73–61	7–8 (2–2)	Sharp Gym (326); Houston, TX
January 10; 6:30 pm		at McNeese State	W 61–54	8–8 (3–2)	Burton Coliseum (727); Lake Charles, LA
January 13; 1:30 pm		Central Arkansas	L 48–69	8–9 (3–3)	Stopher Gym (315); Thibodaux, LA
January 17; 7:00 pm		at Texas A&M–Corpus Christi	L 55–76	8–10 (3–4)	Dugan Wellness Center (573); Corpus Christi, TX
January 24; 6:00 pm		Lamar	L 61–76	8–11 (3–5)	Stopher Gym (222); Thibodaux, LA
January 27; 4:00 pm		Southeastern Louisiana	L 57–66	8–12 (3–6)	Stopher Gym (678); Thibodaux, LA
February 3; 2:00 pm		at New Orleans	W 62–61	9–12 (4–6)	Lakefront Arena (347); New Orleans, LA
February 7; 6:00 pm		Abilene Christian	W 81–60	10–12 (5–6)	Stopher Gym (202); Thibodaux, LA
February 10; 1:00 pm		Houston Baptist	W 63–45	11–12 (6–6)	Stopher Gym (230); Thibodaux, LA
February 14; 6:30 pm		at Sam Houston State	W 70–65	12–12 (7–6)	Bernard Johnson Coliseum (741); Huntsville, TX
February 17; 1:00 pm		at Central Arkansas	L 42–60	12–13 (7–7)	Farris Center (910); Conway, AR
February 21; 6:00 pm		McNeese State	W 63–51	13–13 (8–7)	Stopher Gym (202); Thibodaux, LA
February 24; 4:00 pm		New Orleans	W 72–48	14–13 (9–7)	Stopher Gym (433); Thibodaux, LA
February 28; 6:00 pm		Northwestern State	W 85–53	15–13 (10–7)	Stopher Gym (265); Thibodaux, LA
March 3; 2:00 pm		at Southeastern Louisiana	W 79–64	16–13 (11–7)	University Center (816); Hammond, LA
Southland Women's Tournament
March 9; 11:00 am, ESPN3	(4)	vs. (5) Texas A&M–Corpus Christi; Quarterfinals	W 61–59	17–13	Merrell Center; Katy, TX
March 10; 1:00 pm, ESPN3	(4)	vs. (1) Lamar; Semifinals	W 74–68	18–13	Merrell Center; Katy, TX
March 11; 12:00 pm, CBSSN	(4)	vs. (2) Stephen F. Austin; Championship Game	W 69–65	19–12	Merrell Center (927); Katy, TX
Southland Women's Tournament
March 17*; 5:00 pm, ESPN2	(16 KC)	at (1 KC) No. 4 Mississippi State; First Round	L 50–95	19–13	Humphrey Coliseum (10,211); Starkville, MS
*Non-conference game. ^{#}Rankings from AP Poll. (#) Tournament seedings in parentheses. KC=Kansas City Region. All times are in Central Time.

== Rankings ==
2017–18 NCAA Division I women's basketball rankings

Regular season polls
Poll	Pre- Season	Week 2	Week 3	Week 4	Week 5	Week 6	Week 7	Week 8	Week 9	Week 10	Week 11	Week 12	Week 13	Week 14	Week 15	Week 16	Week 17	Week 18	Week 19	Final
AP																				N/A
Coaches																				RV

Legend
	Increase in ranking
	Decrease in ranking
	No change
(RV)	Received votes
(NR)	Not ranked

== See also ==
- 2017–18 Nicholls State Colonels men's basketball team
