= 2017–18 Lamar Lady Cardinals basketball team =

Intercollegiate basketball season

2017–18 Lamar Lady Cardinals basketball

Southland Regular Season Champions

2018 Women's National Invitation Tournament, First round
- Conference: Southland Conference
- Record: 22–8 (17–1 Southland)
- Head coach: Robin Harmony (5th season)
- Assistant coaches: Randy Schneider (5th season); Hana Haden (1st season); Cameron Miles (2nd season)
- Home arena: Montagne Center (Capacity: 10,080)

2017–18 Southland Conference women's basketball standings
	Conf.				Overall
Team	W		L	PCT	W		L	PCT
Lamar	17	–	1	.944	22	–	7	.759
Stephen F. Austin	16	–	2	.889	25	–	6	.806
Central Arkansas	14	–	4	.778	25	–	10	.714
Texas A&M-CC	11	–	7	.611	19	–	12	.613
Nicholls State †	11	–	7	.611	19	–	13	.594
New Orleans	11	–	7	.611	15	–	15	.500
Abilene Christian	9	–	9	.500	16	–	14	.533
McNeese State	8	–	10	.444	12	–	18	.400
Southeastern Louisiana	7	–	11	.389	8	–	21	.276
Houston Baptist	6	–	12	.333	10	–	18	.357
Incarnate Word	4	–	14	.222	5	–	24	.172
Northwestern State	2	–	16	.111	7	–	22	.241
Sam Houston State	1	–	17	.056	4	–	23	.148
† 2018 Southland tournament winner Rankings from AP poll

The 2017–18 Lamar Lady Cardinals basketball team represented Lamar University during the 2017–18 NCAA Division I women's basketball season. The Lady Cardinals, led by fifth year head coach Robin Harmony, played their home games at the Montagne Center and are members of the Southland Conference. The Lady Cardinals finished the season with an overall record of 22-8. They won the Southland Conference regular season championship were 17-1 in Southland play. After losing to Nicholls in a Southland Conference tournament semi-final game 68-74, the Lady Cardinals were an automatic qualifier to the WNIT. Their season ended with a first round 68-80 loss to the TCU Horned Frogs in the first round.

== Previous season ==
The Lady Cardinals finished the 2016–17 season with a 21–6, 15–3 Southland play. They lost in the semifinals of the Southland women's tournament to Stephen F. Austin. The Lady Cardinals were invited to the WBI where they lost to Rice, the WBI champion, in the first round.

== Roster ==
2017–18 Lamar Lady Cardinals women's basketball team
Players
Coaches

Pos.	#	Name	Height	Year	Previous school	Hometown
G	0	Lola Bracy	5 ft 7 in (1.7 m)	Fr	Kirkwood HS	St. Louis, MO
G	1	Jadyn Pimentel	5 ft 5 in (1.65 m)	Fr	Parkway North HS	St. Louis, MO
F	3	Kyla Green	5 ft 10 in (1.78 m)	So	Overton HS	Memphis, TN
C	4	Briana Laidler	6 ft 1 in (1.85 m)	So	Spruce Creek HS	Port Orange, FL
G	5	Balleigh O'Dell	5 ft 5 in (1.65 m)	Sr	Verdigris HS	Claremore, OK
G	10	Chastadie Barrs	5 ft 8 in (1.73 m)	Jr	DeSoto HS	DeSoto, TX
G	11	McKenzie Alton	6 ft 0 in (1.83 m)	Fr	Bellarmine Prep HS	Gig Harbor, WA
F	12	Kiara Desamours	5 ft 9 in (1.75 m)	Jr	Dunbar HS	Fort Myers, FL
G	13	Shedricka Pierson	5 ft 9 in (1.75 m)	Fr	Brusly HS	Brusly, LA
G	15	DeJa Roberts	5 ft 7 in (1.7 m)	Jr	Nova HS	Davie, FL
C	20	Rikiah Cowart	6 ft 2 in (1.88 m)	Fr	Nova HS	Lauderhill, FL
G	22	DeA'ngela Mathis	6 ft 0 in (1.83 m)	Sr	Southeast HS	Bradenton, FL
G	23	Moe Kinard	5 ft 9 in (1.75 m)	Jr	New Iberia HS; Houston	New Iberia, LA
G	24	Ashlan Miles	5 ft 9 in (1.75 m)	So	Dallas Christian HS	Dallas, TX
C	33	Kiandra Bowers	5 ft 11 in (1.8 m)	RS Sr	Dwyer HS	West Palm Beach, FL

Head coach

- Robin Harmony (Miami (FL))

Assistant coach(es)

- Randy Schneider (FIU)
- Hana Haden (Harris–Stowe State)
- Cameron Miles (San Diego)

Legend

- (C) Team captain
- (S) Suspended
- (I) Ineligible
- (W) Walk-on
- Injured
- Current redshirt

Roster
Last update: 2018-02-28

== Schedule ==
Date time, TV	Rank^{#}	Opponent^{#}	Result	Record	High points	High rebounds	High assists	Site (attendance) city, state
Non-Conference schedule
November 10, 2017*; 7:00 pm		at No. 3 Baylor	L 62–121	0–1	16 – C. Barrs	6 – K. Green	6 – C. Barrs	Ferrell Center (5,410); Waco, TX
November 13*; 7:00 pm		Louisiana College	W 93–62	1–1	16 – B. Laidler	9 – C. Barrs	10 – Barrs	Montagne Center (275); Beaumont, TX
November 16*; 5:00 pm, ESPN3		Southwestern Assemblies of God	W 92–49	2–1	24 – C. Barrs	10 – C. Barrs	6 – Barrs	Montagne Center (630); Beaumont, TX
November 18*; 12:00 pm, BTN+		at Purdue	L 64–79	2–2	18 – C. Barrs	6 – K. Bowers	6 – Barrs	Mackey Arena (5,579); West Lafayette, IN
November 21*; 7:00 pm, ESPN3		Howard Payne	W 101–37	3–2	20 – J. Pimentel	16 – K. Bowers	6 – J. Pimentel	Montagne Center (630); Beaumont, TX
November 24*; 2:00 pm		vs. North Dakota; UTSA Thanksgiving Classic	L 70–73	3–3	24 – M. Kinnard	6 – “Tied”	6 – Barrs	Convocation Center; San Antonio, TX
November 25*; 12:00 pm		vs. Northern Illinois; UTSA Thanksgiving Classic	W 90–80	4–3	30 – M. Kinnard	13 – M. Kinnard	9 – C. Barrs	Convocation Center; San Antonio, TX
November 30*; 9:00 pm		at Pacific	L 75–80	4–4	20 – M. Kinnard	10 – K. Bowers	5 – C. Barrs	Alex G. Spanos Center (321); Stockton, CA
December 4*; 7:00 pm, ESPN3		Schreiner	W 116–37	5–4	24 – L. Bracy	6 – J. Pimentel	11 – C. Barrs	Montagne Center (510); Beaumont, TX
December 20*; 8:00 pm, MWN		at New Mexico	L 58–90	5–5	12 – K. Green	8 – K. Green	4 – “Tied”	The Pit (5,081); Albuquerque, NM
Conference schedule
December 28, 2017; 7:00 pm		at Houston Baptist	W 79–51	6–5 (1–0)	24 – B. O’Dell	12 – K. Bowers	4 – Barrs	Sharp Gym (242); Houston, TX
December 30; 5:00 pm		Texas A&M–Corpus Christi	W 70–31	7–5 (2–0)	20 – D. Mathis	9 – M. Kinnard	6 – Barrs	American Bank Center (2,472); Corpus Christi, TX
January 3, 2018; 7:00 pm, ESPN3		New Orleans	W 100–77	8–5 (3–0)	25 – D. Mathis	17 – K. Bowers	8 – C. Barrs	Montagne Center (578); Beaumont, TX
January 6; 1:00 pm		Central Arkansas	L 39–51	8–6 (3–1)	18 – M. Kinard	6 – D. Mathis	4 – Barrs	Farris Center (425); Conway, AR
January 10; 7:00 pm		at Southeastern Louisiana	W 75–58	9–6 (4–1)	30 – D. Mathis	10 – D. Mathis	5 – Barrs	University Center (447); Hammond, LA
January 18; 7:00 pm, ESPN3		Incarnate Word	W 77–54	10–6 (5–1)	23 – M. Kinnard	13 – K. Bowers	5 – C. Barrs	Montagne Center (556); Beaumont, TX
January 20; 2:00 pm, ESPN3		Sam Houston State	W 91–44	11–6 (6–1)	21 – “Tied”	22 – K. Bowers	8 – C. Barrs	Montagne Center (904); Beaumont, TX
January 24; 6:00 pm		at Nicholls	W 76–61	12–6 (7–1)	28 – M. Kinard	10 – K. Bowers	8 – J. Pimentel	Stopher Gym (222) hibodaux, LA
January 27; 2:00 pm, ESPN3		McNeese State; Battle of the Border	W 83–58	13–6 (8–1)	24 – M. Kinard	11 – K. Bowers	9 – C. Barrs	Montagne Center (955); Beaumont, TX
January 31; 7:00 pm, ESPN3		at Abilene Christian	W 77–71	14–6 (9–1)	30 – K. Bowers	16 – K. Bowers	10 – C. Barrs	Montagne Center (544); Beaumont, TX
February 3; 2:00 pm, ESPN3		Stephen F. Austin	W 79–65	15–6 (10–1)	17 – “Tied”	17 – K. Bowers	5 – C. Barrs	Montagne Center (951); Beaumont, TX
February 7; 7:00 pm, ESPN3		Northwestern State	W 71–44	16–6 (11–1)	21 – M. Kinnard	9 – K. Bowers	9 – C. Barrs	Montagne Center (848); Beaumont, TX
February 10; 3:00 pm, ESPN3		at Sam Houston State	W 68–44	17–6 (12–1)	19 – C. Barrs	14 – K. Bowers	7 – C. Barrs	Bernard Johnson Coliseum (1,166); Huntsville, TX
February 14; 6:00 pm		at Incarnate Word	W 71–47	18–6 (13–1)	19 – D. Mathis	8 – M. Kinard	6 – J. Pimentel	McDermott Convocation Center (388); San Antonio, TX
February 17; 2:00 pm, ESPN3		Texas A&M–Corpus Christi	W 65–59	19–6 (14–1)	18 – C. Barrs	13 – K. Bowers	7 – C. Barrs	Montagne Center (1,297); Beaumont, TX
February 21; 7:00 pm, ESPN3		Houston Baptist	W 90–55	20–6 (15–1)	35 – D. Mathis	8 – K. Bowers	10 – C. Barrs	Montagne Center (688); Beaumont, TX
February 24; 3:30 pm, ESPN3		Stephen F. Austin	W 81–77	21–6 (16–1)	19 – K. Bowers	10 – K. Bowers	8 – C. Barrs	William R. Johnson Coliseum (897); Nacogdoches, TX
March 3; 1:00 pm		at McNeese State; Battle of the Border	W 81–72	22–6 (17–1)	17 – K.Bowers	14 – K. Bowers	6 – C. Barrs	Burton Coliseum (983); Lake Charles, LA
Southland Tournament
March 10; 1:00 pm, ESPN3	(1)	(4) Nicholls; Semifinals	L 68–74	22–7	21 – M. Kinard	18 – K. Bowers	9 – C. Barrs	Merrell Center; Katy, TX
WNIT
March 15*; 6:30 pm		at TCU; First Round	L 68–80	22–8	23 – J. Pimentel	9 – K. Bowers	3 – "Tied"	Schollmaier Arena (1,330); Fort Worth, TX
*Non-conference game. ^{#}Rankings from AP Poll. (#) Tournament seedings in parentheses. All times are in Central Time.

== See also ==
2017–18 Lamar Cardinals basketball team
