= 2017–18 Central Arkansas Sugar Bears basketball team =

Intercollegiate basketball season

2017–18 Central Arkansas Sugar Bears basketball

WBI, runner-up
- Conference: Southland Conference
- Record: 25–10 (14–4 Southland)
- Head coach: Sandra Rushing (6th season)
- Assistant coaches: Greg Long; Shameka Thomas; Arissa Jackson
- Home arena: Farris Center

2017–18 Southland Conference women's basketball standings
	Conf.				Overall
Team	W		L	PCT	W		L	PCT
Lamar	17	–	1	.944	22	–	7	.759
Stephen F. Austin	16	–	2	.889	25	–	6	.806
Central Arkansas	14	–	4	.778	25	–	10	.714
Texas A&M-CC	11	–	7	.611	19	–	12	.613
Nicholls State †	11	–	7	.611	19	–	13	.594
New Orleans	11	–	7	.611	15	–	15	.500
Abilene Christian	9	–	9	.500	16	–	14	.533
McNeese State	8	–	10	.444	12	–	18	.400
Southeastern Louisiana	7	–	11	.389	8	–	21	.276
Houston Baptist	6	–	12	.333	10	–	18	.357
Incarnate Word	4	–	14	.222	5	–	24	.172
Northwestern State	2	–	16	.111	7	–	22	.241
Sam Houston State	1	–	17	.056	4	–	23	.148
† 2018 Southland tournament winner Rankings from AP poll

The 2017–18 Central Arkansas Sugar Bears basketball team represented the University of Central Arkansas during the 2017–18 NCAA Division I women's basketball season. The Sugar Bears were led by sixth-year head coach Sandra Rushing and played their home games at the Farris Center in Conway, Arkansas. They were members of the Southland Conference. They finished the season 25–10, 14–4 in Southland play, to finish in third place. They advanced to the semifinals of the Southland women's tournament, where they lost to Stephen F. Austin. They received an invite to the WBI, where they defeated SIU Edwardsville, Weber State and Nevada in the first round, quarterfinals and semifinals, respectively, to advance to the championship game, where they lost to Yale in the championship game.

== Previous season ==
They finished the season 26–5 overall and 16–2 in Southland play, to finish in first place. They won the Southland women's tournament to earn an automatic trip to the NCAA women's tournament for the second year in a row. They lost to Texas in the first round.

== Roster ==
2017–18 Central Arkansas Sugar Bears women's basketball team
Players
Coaches

Pos.	#	Name	Height	Year	Previous school	Hometown
G	1	Taylor Sells	5 ft 7 in (1.7 m)	So	Booker T. Washington HS	Tulsa, OK
G	2	Kamry Orr	5 ft 6 in (1.68 m)	Jr	Little Rock HS	Little Rock, AR
G	3	Savannah Lowe	5 ft 8 in (1.73 m)	Fr	Conway HS	Conway, AR
G	5	Maddie Goodner	5 ft 6 in (1.68 m)	So	Greenwood HS	Greenwood, AR
G	11	Antonjia Bozic	5 ft 10 in (1.78 m)	Jr	Jacksonville College	Slavonski Brod, Croatia
F	12	Mekaylan Hicks	6 ft 0 in (1.83 m)	Fr	El Dorado HS	El Dorado, AR
F	15	Tieraney Paylor	5 ft 10 in (1.78 m)	RS So	Ridgeway HS	Memphis, TN
C	20	Kierra Jordan	6 ft 1 in (1.85 m)	Sr	Lanier HS; Southern Miss	Jackson, MS
G	21	Angel Williams	5 ft 6 in (1.68 m)	Sr	Bellaire HS	Bellaire, TX
F	23	Taylor Baudoin	6 ft 0 in (1.83 m)	Sr	New Hope HS; Jones County JC	Columbus, MS
G	25	Alanie Fisher	5 ft 9 in (1.75 m)	Jr	University HS; Coffeyville CC	Baton Rouge, LA
C	31	Hannah Langhi	6 ft 2 in (1.88 m)	Fr	Marshall County HS	Draffenville, KY
C	33	Alexyse Thomas	6 ft 3 in (1.91 m)	Jr	Horn Lake HS; Wright State	Horn Lake, MS

Head coach

- Sandra Rushing (Alabama)

Assistant coach(es)

- Greg Long (Chowan)
- Shameka Thomas (Delta State)
- Anissa Jackson

Legend

- (C) Team captain
- (S) Suspended
- (I) Ineligible
- (W) Walk-on
- Injured
- Current redshirt

Roster
Last update: August 5, 2024

== Schedule ==
Date time, TV	Rank^{#}	Opponent^{#}	Result	Record	Site (attendance) city, state
Non-conference regular season
November 10, 2017*; 6:00 p.m.		Hendrix College	W 79–22	1–0	Farris Center (682); Conway, AR
November 14, 2017*; 7:00 p.m., FCS		at No. 3 Baylor	L 55–86	1–1	Ferrell Center (4,877); Waco, TX
November 20, 2017*; 6:00 p.m.		Alcorn State	W 75–52	2–1	Farris Center (410); Conway, AR
November 28, 2017*; 6:00 p.m.		Crowley's Ridge College	W 106–23	3–1	Farris Center (327); Conway, AR
November 30, 2017*; 6:00 p.m.		at No. 12 Tennessee	L 34–77	3–2	Thompson–Boling Arena (7,311); Knoxville, TN
December 4, 2017*; 6:00 p.m.		Williams Baptist College	W 77–31	4–2	Farris Center (327); Conway, AR
December 7, 2017*; 6:00 p.m.		Central Baptist College	W 75–34	5–2	Farris Center (302); Conway, AR
December 9, 2017*; 1:00 p.m.		at No. 21 Texas A&M	L 61–72	5–3	Reed Arena (3,886); College Station, TX
December 16, 2017*; 1:05 p.m.		at South Alabama	L 43–64	5–4	Mitchell Center (1,901); Mobile, AL
December 20, 2017*; 2:31 p.m.		vs. Clemson; FIU Holiday Tournament	W 57–43	6–4	FIU Arena (284); Miami, FL
December 21, 2017*; 1:00 p.m.		vs. North Dakota State; FIU Holiday Tournament	W 68–45	7–4	FIU Arena; Miami, FL
Southland Conference regular season
December 28, 2017; 1:00 p.m.		at Texas A&M–Corpus Christi	W 58–50	8–4 (1–0)	Dugan Wellness Center (158); Corpus Christi, TX
December 31, 2017; 1:00 p.m.		Southeastern Louisiana	W 63–47	9–4 (2–0)	Farris Center (512); Conway, AR
January 3, 2018; 7:00 p.m.		Sam Houston State	W 69–44	10–4 (3–0)	Farris Center (412); Conway, AR
January 6, 2018; 1:00 p.m.		Lamar	W 51–39	11–4 (4–0)	Farris Center (425); Conway, AR
January 10, 2018; 6:00 p.m.		at Incarnate Word	W 57–35	12–4 (5–0)	McDermott Center (791); San Antonio, TX
January 13, 2018; 6:00 p.m.		at Nicholls	W 69–48	13–4 (6–0)	Stopher Gym (315); Thibodeaux, LA
January 17, 2018; 7:00 p.m.		New Orleans	L 48–52	13–5 (6–1)	Farris Center (423); Conway, AR
January 20, 2018; 1:00 p.m., ESPN3		Abilene Christian	W 63–45	14–5 (7–1)	Farris Center (742); Conway, AR
January 24, 2018; 7:00 p.m., ESPN3		at Stephen F. Austin	L 46–59	14–6 (7–2)	William R. Johnson Coliseum (1,103); Nacogdoches, TX
January 27, 2018; 1:00 p.m.		at Northwestern State	W 61–53	15–6 (8–2)	Prather Coliseum (1,518); Natchitoches, LA
February 3, 2018; 2:00 p.m.		at Southeastern Louisiana	L 70–78	15–7 (8–3)	University Center (595); Hammond, LA
February 7, 2018; 7:00 p.m.		Houston Baptist	W 64–56	16–7 (9–3)	Farris Center (479); Conway, AR
February 14, 2018; 6:30 p.m.		at McNeese	W 51–45	17–7 (10–3)	Burton Coliseum (767); Lake Charles, LA
February 17, 2018; 1:00 p.m.		Nicholls	W 60–42	18–7 (11–3)	Farris Center (910); Conway, AR
February 21, 2018; 7:00 p.m.		Stephen F. Austin	L 50–55	18–8 (11–4)	Farris Center (428); Conway, AR
February 24, 2018; 2:00 p.m.		at Abilene Christian	W 73–61	19–8 (12–4)	Moody Coliseum (1,450); Abilene, TX
February 28, 2018; 6:30 p.m.		at Sam Houston State	W 73–53	20–8 (13–4)	Bernard Johnson Coliseum (758); Huntsville, TX
March 3, 2018; 3:00 p.m.		Northwestern State	W 59–39	21–8 (14–4)	Farris Center (1,045); Conway, AR
Southland women's tournament
March 9, 2018; 1:30 p.m., ESPN3	(3)	vs. (7) Abilene Christian; Quarterfinals	W 54–41	22–8	Merrell Center (606); Katy, TX
March 10, 2018; 3:30 p.m., ESPN3	(3)	vs. (2) Stephen F. Austin; Semifinals	L 60–70	22–9	Merrell Center (1,446); Katy, TX
WBI
March 15, 2018*; 7:00 p.m.		SIU Edwardsville; First round	W 51–39	23–9	Farris Center (487); Conway, AR
March 19, 2018; 7:00 p.m.		Weber State; Quarterfinals	W 82–67	24–9	Farris Center (2,570); Conway, AR
March 24, 2018; 5:00 p.m.		Nevada; Semifinals	W 65–56	25–9	Farris Center (1,457); Conway, AR
March 29, 2018; 7:00 p.m.		Yale; Championship game	L 50–54	25–10	Farris Center (3,526); Conway, AR
*Non-conference game. ^{#}Rankings from AP poll. (#) Tournament seedings in parentheses. All times are in Central.

== See also ==
- 2017–18 Central Arkansas Bears basketball team
