= 2017–18 Southeastern Louisiana Lady Lions basketball team =

Intercollegiate basketball season

2017–18 Southeastern Louisiana Lady Lions basketball
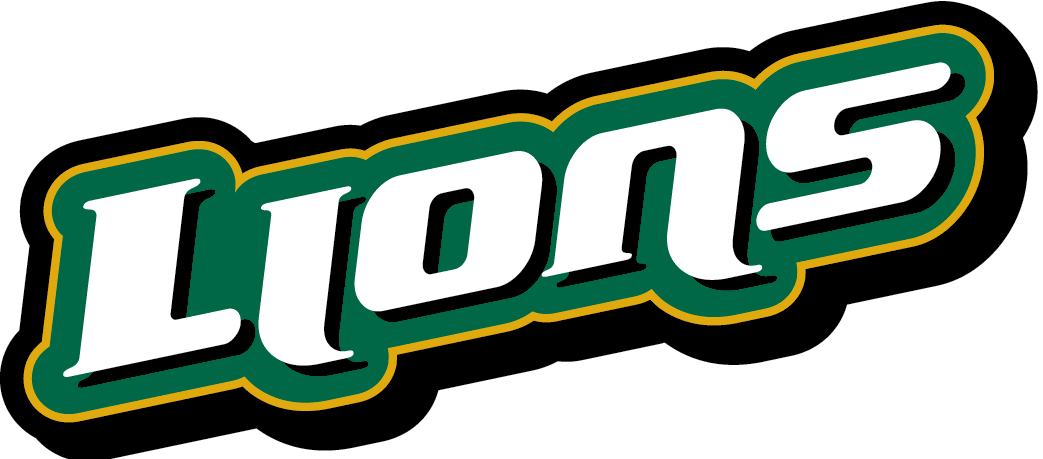
- Conference: Southland Conference
- Record: 8–21 (7–11 Southland)
- Head coach: Ayla Guzzardo (1st season)
- Assistant coaches: Kenneth Lee, Jr.; Aja Gibson; Chelsie Butler
- Home arena: University Center

2017–18 Southland Conference women's basketball standings
| | Conf. | | | | Overall |
| Team | W | | L | PCT | W | | L | PCT |
|---|---|---|---|---|---|---|---|---|
| Lamar | 17 | – | 1 | .944 | 22 | – | 7 | .759 |
| Stephen F. Austin | 16 | – | 2 | .889 | 25 | – | 6 | .806 |
| Central Arkansas | 14 | – | 4 | .778 | 25 | – | 10 | .714 |
| Texas A&M-CC | 11 | – | 7 | .611 | 19 | – | 12 | .613 |
| Nicholls State † | 11 | – | 7 | .611 | 19 | – | 13 | .594 |
| New Orleans | 11 | – | 7 | .611 | 15 | – | 15 | .500 |
| Abilene Christian | 9 | – | 9 | .500 | 16 | – | 14 | .533 |
| McNeese State | 8 | – | 10 | .444 | 12 | – | 18 | .400 |
| Southeastern Louisiana | 7 | – | 11 | .389 | 8 | – | 21 | .276 |
| Houston Baptist | 6 | – | 12 | .333 | 10 | – | 18 | .357 |
| Incarnate Word | 4 | – | 14 | .222 | 5 | – | 24 | .172 |
| Northwestern State | 2 | – | 16 | .111 | 7 | – | 22 | .241 |
| Sam Houston State | 1 | – | 17 | .056 | 4 | – | 23 | .148 |
† 2018 Southland tournament winner Rankings from AP poll

The 2017–18 Southeastern Louisiana Lady Lions basketball team represented Southeastern Louisiana University during the 2017–18 NCAA Division I women's basketball season. The Lady Lions, led by first-year head coach Ayla Guzzardo, played their home games at the University Center. They were members of the Southland Conference. They finished the season with an 8–21 overall record, and a 7–11 record in Southland play, to finish in ninth place. They failed to qualify for the Southland women's tournament.

== Roster ==
2017–18 Southeastern Louisiana Lions women's basketball team
Players
Coaches

| Pos. | # | Name | Height | Year | Previous school | Hometown |
|---|---|---|---|---|---|---|
| F | 0 | Kyla Williams | 5 ft 11 in (1.8 m) | Jr | Cabrini HS; Hutchinson CC | New Orleans, LA |
| G | 1 | Courtney Dawsey | 5 ft 6 in (1.68 m) | So | St. Thomas Aquinas HS | Hammond, LA |
| G/F | 3 | Morgan Carrier | 5 ft 9 in (1.75 m) | Fr | New Iberia HS | New Iberia, LA |
| G | 5 | Charliee Dugas | 5 ft 8 in (1.73 m) | So | Rayne HS | Rayne, LA |
| F | 12 | Jyar Francis | 6 ft 1 in (1.85 m) | Jr | Ponchatoula HS; Wichita State | Ponchatoula, LA |
| G | 13 | Rhomyia Tate | 5 ft 3 in (1.6 m) | Jr | Ponchatoula HS; Baton Rouge CC | Tickfaw, LA |
| G | 14 | Taylin Underwood | 5 ft 7 in (1.7 m) | Sr | Doyle HS | Livingston, LA |
| F | 15 | Lauren Bush | 5 ft 9 in (1.75 m) | Fr | Lusher HS | New Orleans, LA |
| G | 23 | Jaclyn Scovin | 5 ft 7 in (1.7 m) | Jr | Fontainebleau HS | Mandeville, LA |
| G | 24 | Tyler Morrison | 5 ft 8 in (1.73 m) | So | St. Michael HS | Baton Rouge, LA |
| F | 25 | Caitlyn Williams | 6 ft 0 in (1.83 m) | Fr | Brusly HS | Brusly, LA |
| G | 30 | Ashailee Brailey | 5 ft 8 in (1.73 m) | Jr | Vermillion Catholic HS; Jones County JC | Abbeville, LA |
| G | 33 | Bre Warren | 5 ft 7 in (1.7 m) | Sr | Northshore HS; Milwaukee | Slidell, LA |

Head coach

- Ayla Guzzardo (Akron)

Assistant coach(es)

- Kenneth Lee, Jr. (Nicholls State)
- Aja Gibson (Southeastern Louisiana)
- Chelsie Butler (Marquette)

Legend

- (C) Team captain
- (S) Suspended
- (I) Ineligible
- (W) Walk-on
- Injured
- Current redshirt

Roster
Last update: March 6, 2018

== Schedule ==
| Date time, TV | Rank^{#} | Opponent^{#} | Result | Record | Site (attendance) city, state |
Exhibition
| 11/03/2017*; 6:00 pm | | LSU–Alexandria | W 96–78 | | University Center (549); Hammond, LA |
Non-conference regular season
| 11/10/2017*; 5:00 pm | | Alcorn State | L 77–84 ^{OT} | 0–1 | University Center (502); Hammond, LA |
| 11/12/2017*; 2:00 pm | | at LSU | L 56–84 | 0–2 | Maravich Center (2,353); Baton Rouge, LA |
| 11/15/2017*; 6:00 pm | | at Cincinnati | L 43–82 | 0–3 | Saint Ursula Academy Gym (330); Cincinnati, OH |
| 11/17/2017*; 6:30 pm, ESPN3 | | at Akron; Akron Classic | L 54–66 | 0–4 | James A. Rhodes Arena (713); Akron, OH |
| 11/18/2017*; 11:00 am | | vs. Kent State; Akron Classic | L 60–81 | 0–5 | James A. Rhodes Arena; Akron, OH |
| 11/26/2017*; 2:00 pm | | at Bethune–Cookman | W 60–58 | 1–5 | Moore Gymnasium (404); Daytona Beach, FL |
| 11/30/2017*; 6:00 pm | | at Grambling State | L 52–61 | 1–6 | Fredrick C. Hobdy Assembly Center (451); Grambling, LA |
| 12/10/2017*; 2:00 pm, FSSW | | at TCU | L 62–112 | 1–7 | Schollmaier Arena (2,005); Fort Worth, TX |
| 12/13/2017*; 7:00 pm | | Louisiana | L 56–68 | 1–8 | University Center (549); Hammond, LA |
| 12/19/2017*; 6:00 pm | | at Auburn | L 46–80 | 1–9 | Auburn Arena (1,585); Auburn, AL |
| 12/21/2017*; 2:00 pm | | Alabama A&M | L 74–76 | 1–10 | University Center (407); Hammond, LA |
Southland Conference regular season
| 12/28/2017; 7:00 pm, ESPN3 | | at Stephen F. Austin | L 67–79 | 1–11 (0–1) | William R. Johnson Coliseum (693); Nacogdoches, TX |
| 12/31/2017; 1:00 pm | | at Central Arkansas | L 47–63 | 1–12 (0–2) | Farris Center (512); Conway, AR |
| 01/06/2018; 1:00 pm | | at Abilene Christian | L 80–86 | 1–13 (0–3) | Moody Coliseum (1,068); Abilene, TX |
| 01/10/2018; 7:00 pm | | Lamar | L 58–75 | 1–14 (0–4) | University Center (447); Hammond, LA |
| 01/13/2018; 2:00 pm | | McNeese State | L 65–77 | 1–15 (0–5) | University Center (579); Hammond, LA |
| 01/17/2018; 7:00 pm | | at Houston Baptist | W 76–61 | 2–15 (1–5) | Sharp Gym (314); Houston, TX |
| 01/20/2018; 2:00 pm | | Northwestern State | W 71–65 | 3–15 (2–5) | University Center (310); Hammond, LA |
| 01/24/2018; 7:00 pm | | Sam Houston State | L 52–57 | 3–16 (2–6) | University Center (610); Hammond, LA |
| 01/27/2018; 4:00 pm, ESPN3 | | at Nicholls State | W 66–57 | 4–16 (3–6) | Stopher Gym (678); Thibodaux, LA |
| 01/31/2018; 7:00 pm, ESPN3 | | at Texas A&M–Corpus Christi | L 52–56 | 4–17 (3–7) | Dugan Wellness Center (756); Corpus Christi, TX |
| 02/03/2018; 2:00 pm | | Central Arkansas | W 78–70 | 5–17 (4–7) | University Center (595); Hammond, LA |
| 02/07/2018; 7:00 pm | | Incarnate Word | W 65–54 | 6–17 (5–7) | University Center (415); Hammond, LA |
| 02/10/2018; 1:00 pm | | at McNeese State | L 47–69 | 6–18 (5–8) | Burton Coliseum (539); Lake Charles, LA |
| 02/14/2018; 7:00 pm | | at New Orleans | L 73–82 | 6–19 (5–9) | Lakefront Arena (241); New Orleans, LA |
| 02/17/2018; 2:00 pm | | Abilene Christian | W 78–76 | 7–19 (6–9) | University Center (790); Hammond, LA |
| 02/24/2018; 2:00 pm | | at Northwestern State | W 65–54 | 8–19 (7–9) | Prather Coliseum (980); Natchitoches, LA |
| 02/28/2018; 7:00 pm | | New Orleans | L 71–74 | 8–20 (7–10) | University Center (478); Hammond, LA |
| 03/02/2018; 2:00 pm | | Nicholls State | L 64–79 | 8–21 (7–11) | University Center (816); Hammond, LA |
*Non-conference game. ^{#}Rankings from AP Poll. (#) Tournament seedings in parentheses. All times are in Central Time.

== See also ==
- 2017–18 Southeastern Louisiana Lions basketball team
