= 2017–18 Houston Baptist Huskies women's basketball team =

Intercollegiate basketball season

2017–18 Houston Baptist Huskies women's basketball
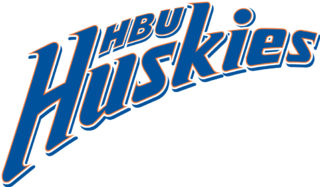
- Conference: Southland Conference
- Record: 10–18 (6–12 Southland)
- Head coach: Donna Finnie (5th season)
- Assistant coaches: Lauren Tippert; Becca Allison; Precious Ivy
- Home arena: Sharp Gymnasium

2017–18 Southland Conference women's basketball standings
	Conf.				Overall
Team	W		L	PCT	W		L	PCT
Lamar	17	–	1	.944	22	–	7	.759
Stephen F. Austin	16	–	2	.889	25	–	6	.806
Central Arkansas	14	–	4	.778	25	–	10	.714
Texas A&M-CC	11	–	7	.611	19	–	12	.613
Nicholls State †	11	–	7	.611	19	–	13	.594
New Orleans	11	–	7	.611	15	–	15	.500
Abilene Christian	9	–	9	.500	16	–	14	.533
McNeese State	8	–	10	.444	12	–	18	.400
Southeastern Louisiana	7	–	11	.389	8	–	21	.276
Houston Baptist	6	–	12	.333	10	–	18	.357
Incarnate Word	4	–	14	.222	5	–	24	.172
Northwestern State	2	–	16	.111	7	–	22	.241
Sam Houston State	1	–	17	.056	4	–	23	.148
† 2018 Southland tournament winner Rankings from AP poll

The 2017–18 Houston Baptist Huskies women's basketball team represented Houston Baptist University in the 2017–18 college basketball season. The Huskies, led by fifth-year head coach Donna Finnie, played their home games at the Sharp Gymnasium and were members of the Southland Conference. They finished with an overall record of 10–18 and 6–12 in Southland play to finish in tenth place. They failed to qualify for the Southland women's tournament.

== Roster ==
2017–18 Houston Baptist Huskies women's basketball team
Players
Coaches

Pos.	#	Name	Height	Year	Previous school	Hometown
G	3	Shannon Jones	5 ft 10 in (1.78 m)	So	Crosby HS	Crosby, TX
G	5	Sophie Taylor	5 ft 9 in (1.75 m)	So	Westwood HS	Austin, TX
PG	10	Bria Johnson	5 ft 6 in (1.68 m)	So	Sunnyvale HS	Sunnyvale, TX
G	11	Britta Daub	5 ft 9 in (1.75 m)	So	Felix-Klein-Gymnasium	Rosdorf, Germany
G	13	Megan Valdez-Crader	5 ft 5 in (1.65 m)	Fr	Johnson HS	San Antonio, TX
G	14	Amanda Johnson	6 ft 1 in (1.85 m)	Jr	Georgetown HS	Georgetown, TX
G	22	Sydney Carr	5 ft 8 in (1.73 m)	So	Crosby HS	Crosby, TX
F	23	Lauren Calver	6 ft 1 in (1.85 m)	So	Heathcote HS	Helensburgh, Australia
F	24	Taylor Kollmorgan	6 ft 0 in (1.83 m)	So	Second Baptist HS	Houston, TX
C	25	Natalia Gwarda	6 ft 3 in (1.91 m)	Jr	NLO PZKosz Lomianki; New Mexico JC	Aleksandrów, Poland
F	33	Brooklyn Moore	5 ft 11 in (1.8 m)	Jr	Wylie HS	Murphy, TX
F	42	Blair Gillard	6 ft 1 in (1.85 m)	Sr	La Grange HS	La Grange, TX
C	45	Veronika Kirienko	6 ft 4 in (1.93 m)	Sr	School 168	Tashkent, Uzbekistan
C	55	Kennedy Collins	6 ft 1 in (1.85 m)	Jr	Cedar Park HS	Bastrop, TX

Head coach

- Donna Finnie (Heriot–Watt)

Assistant coach(es)

- Lauren Tippet (Sam Houston State)
- Becca Allison (Old Dominion)
- Precious Ivy (Houston)

Legend

- (C) Team captain
- (S) Suspended
- (I) Ineligible
- (W) Walk-on
- Injured
- Current redshirt

Roster
Last update: March 6, 2018

== Schedule and results ==
Date time, TV	Rank^{#}	Opponent^{#}	Result	Record	Site (attendance) city, state
Non-conference schedule
11/12/2017*; 1:00 pm		at No. 23 South Florida	L 43–90	0–1	USF Sun Dome (2,022); Tampa, FL
11/15/2017*; 5:00 pm		LeTourneau	W 88–43	1–1	Sharp Gymnasium (448); Houston, TX
11/18/2017*; 2:00 pm		at Rice	L 45–67	1–2	Tudor Fieldhouse (576); Houston, TX
11/25/2017*; 12:30 pm		at Oral Roberts	L 56–78	1–3	Mabee Center (917); Tulsa, OK
11/29/2017*; 7:00 pm		Jarvis Christian	W 78–30	2–3	Sharp Gymnasium (380); Houston, TX
12/02/2017*; 2:00 pm		at UTEP	L 62–69	2–4	Don Haskins Center (412); El Paso, TX
12/06/2017*; 7:00 pm		Paul Quinn	W 74–54	3–4	Sharp Gymnasium (377); Houston, TX
12/06/2017*; 7:00 pm		Huston–Tillotson	W 76–72	4–4	Sharp Gymnasium (438); Houston, TX
12/19/2017*; 6:00 pm		at Louisiana–Monroe	L 73–77	4–5	Fant–Ewing Coliseum (639); Monroe, LA
12/21/2017*; 6:30 pm		at Louisiana Tech	L 62–85	4–6	Thomas Assembly Center (1,659); Ruston, LA
Southland Conference schedule
12/28/2017; 7:00 pm		Lamar	L 51–79	4–7 (0–1)	Sharp Gymnasium (242); Houston, TX
12/30/2017; 2:00 pm		at New Orleans	L 52–70	4–8 (0–2)	Lakefront Arena (191); New Orleans, LA
01/06/2018; 2:00 pm		Nicholls State	L 61–73	4–9 (0–3)	Sharp Gymnasium (326); Houston, TX
01/10/2018; 7:00 pm		at Abilene Christian	L 68–80	4–10 (0–4)	Moody Coliseum (1,018); Abilene, TX
01/13/2018; 3:00 pm		at Sam Houston State	W 69–61	5–10 (1–4)	Bernard Johnson Coliseum (946); Huntsville, TX
01/17/2018; 7:00 pm		Southeastern Louisiana	L 61–76	5–11 (1–5)	Sharp Gymnasium (314); Houston, TX
01/20/2018; 2:00 pm		McNeese State	L 74–86	5–12 (1–6)	Sharp Gymnasium (478); Houston, TX
01/24/2018; 6:00 pm		at Incarnate Word	W 58–56	6–12 (2–6)	McDermott Center (626); San Antonio, TX
01/27/2018; 5:00 pm		at Texas A&M–Corpus Christi	L 49–50	6–13 (2–7)	American Bank Center; Corpus Christi, TX
01/31/2018; 7:00 pm		Stephen F. Austin	L 54–76	6–14 (2–8)	Sharp Gymnasium (867); Houston, TX
02/07/2018; 7:00 pm		at Central Arkansas	L 56–64	6–15 (2–6)	Farris Center (479); Conway, AR
02/10/2018; 1:00 pm		at Nicholls State	L 45–63	6–16 (2–10)	Stopher Gym (191); Thibodaux, LA
02/14/2018; 7:00 pm		Northwestern State	W 57–51	7–16 (3–10)	Sharp Gymnasium (252); Houston, TX
02/17/2018; 2:00 pm		Sam Houston State	W 65–62 ^{OT}	8–16 (4–10)	Sharp Gymnasium (597); Houston, TX
02/21/2018; 7:00 pm, ESPN3		at Lamar	L 55–90	8–17 (4–11)	Montagne Center (688); Beaumont, TX
02/24/2018; 2:00 pm		McNeese State	W 67–61 ^{OT}	9–17 (5–11)	Burton Coliseum (717); Lake Charles, LA
02/28/2018; 7:00 pm		Incarnate Word	W 67–56	10–17 (6–11)	Sharp Gymnasium (330); Houston, TX
03/02/2018; 2:00 pm		Texas A&M–Corpus Christi	L 68–73	10–18 (6–12)	Sharp Gymnasium (632); Houston, TX
*Non-conference game. ^{#}Rankings from AP Poll. (#) Tournament seedings in parentheses. All times are in Central.

== See also ==
- 2017–18 Houston Baptist Huskies men's basketball team
