= 2017–18 Northwestern State Lady Demons basketball team =

Intercollegiate basketball season

2017–18 Northwestern State Lady Demons basketball
- Conference: Southland Conference
- Record: 7–22 (2–16 Southland)
- Head coach: Jordan Dupuy (2nd season)
- Assistant coaches: Deneen Parker; Erin Crane; Olivia Grayson
- Home arena: Prather Coliseum

2017–18 Southland Conference women's basketball standings
	Conf.				Overall
Team	W		L	PCT	W		L	PCT
Lamar	17	–	1	.944	22	–	7	.759
Stephen F. Austin	16	–	2	.889	25	–	6	.806
Central Arkansas	14	–	4	.778	25	–	10	.714
Texas A&M-CC	11	–	7	.611	19	–	12	.613
Nicholls State †	11	–	7	.611	19	–	13	.594
New Orleans	11	–	7	.611	15	–	15	.500
Abilene Christian	9	–	9	.500	16	–	14	.533
McNeese State	8	–	10	.444	12	–	18	.400
Southeastern Louisiana	7	–	11	.389	8	–	21	.276
Houston Baptist	6	–	12	.333	10	–	18	.357
Incarnate Word	4	–	14	.222	5	–	24	.172
Northwestern State	2	–	16	.111	7	–	22	.241
Sam Houston State	1	–	17	.056	4	–	23	.148
† 2018 Southland tournament winner Rankings from AP poll

The 2017–18 Northwestern State Lady Demons basketball team represented Northwestern State University during the 2017–18 NCAA Division I women's basketball season. The Demons, led by second-year head coach Jordan Dupuy, played their home games at Prather Coliseum and were members of the Southland Conference. They finished the season 7–22, 2–16 in Southland play, to finish in twelfth place. They failed to qualify for the Southland women's tournament.

== Roster ==
2017–18 Northwestern State Demons women's basketball team
Players
Coaches

Pos.	#	Name	Height	Year	Previous school	Hometown
G	0	Nautica Grant	5 ft 5 in (1.65 m)	Jr	Tyler JC	Dallas, TX
G	1	Gabby Bell	5 ft 4 in (1.63 m)	So	Martin HS	Arlington, TX
G	2	Nia Randall	5 ft 7 in (1.7 m)	So	Garland HS	Garland, TX
G	3	Jada Freeman	5 ft 8 in (1.73 m)	Fr	Ranchview HS	Irving, TX
F	4	Lacee Savage	6 ft 0 in (1.83 m)	Fr	Clear Creek HS	Houston, TX
G	5	Sami Thomas	5 ft 5 in (1.65 m)	Sr	Pickering HS	Leesville, LA
G	10	Jah'ne Wheeler	5 ft 7 in (1.7 m)	Fr	Paxson School	Jacksonville, FL
F	13	Victoria Miller	6 ft 0 in (1.83 m)	So	Hebron HS	Carrollton, TX
F	15	Jasmyn Johnson	5 ft 8 in (1.73 m)	So	West Monroe HS	West Monroe, LA
F	20	Leah Barnes	6 ft 1 in (1.85 m)	Jr	Richfield HS; North Dakota State College of Science	Richfield, MN
F	22	Libba Gilliam	6 ft 1 in (1.85 m)	Jr	Madison Academy	Huntsville, AL
F	23	Joycelyn Scott	5 ft 11 in (1.8 m)	So	McKinney North HS	McKinney, TX
C	32	Cheyenne Brown	6 ft 2 in (1.88 m)	Jr	Martin's Mill HS	Ben Wheeler, TX
F	44	Tia Youngblood	5 ft 10 in (1.78 m)	Sr	DeRidder HS	DeRidder, LA

Head coach

- Jordan Dupuy (Southern Miss)

Assistant coach(es)

- Deneen Parker (Stephen F. Austin)
- Erin Crane (Dubuque)
- Olivia Grayson (Tulane)

Legend

- (C) Team captain
- (S) Suspended
- (I) Ineligible
- (W) Walk-on
- Injured
- Current redshirt

Roster
Last update: August 16, 2024

== Schedule ==
Date time, TV	Rank^{#}	Opponent^{#}	Result	Record	Site (attendance) city, state
Non-conference regular season
November 10, 2017*; 5:00 p.m.		at Ole Miss	L 44–75	0–1	The Pavilion at Ole Miss (8,302); Oxford, MS
November 12, 2017*; 2:00 p.m.		LeTourneau	W 82–39	1–1	Prather Coliseum (1,002); Natchitoches, LA
November 15, 2017*; 6:30 p.m.		LSU–Shreveport	W 62–42	2–1	Prather Coliseum (701); Natchitoches, LA
November 19, 2017*; 1:00 p.m.		at Oklahoma State	L 44–78	2–2	Gallagher-Iba Arena (1,617); Stillwater, OK
November 22, 2017*; 11:00 a.m.		LSU–Alexandria	W 85–55	3–2	Prather Coliseum (784); Natchitoches, LA
November 28, 2017*; 6:30 p.m.		Southern Miss	L 59–71	3–3	Prather Coliseum (742); Natchitoches, LA
December 3, 2017*; 2:00 p.m.		at Louisiana–Monroe	W 70–48	4–3	Fant–Ewing Coliseum (969); Monroe, LA
December 9, 2017*; 2:00 p.m.		vs. Texas Southern; Cenla Showdown	L 43–56	4–4	Rapides Coliseum (702); Alexandria, LA
December 13, 2017*; 7:00 p.m., LHN		at No. 8 Texas	L 44–68	4–5	Frank Erwin Center (3,461); Austin, TX
December 17, 2017*; 2:00 p.m.		at TCU	L 51–89	4–6	Schollmaier Arena (1,920); Fort Worth, TX
December 20, 2017*; 1:00 p.m.		Central Baptist	W 87–22	5–6	Prather Coliseum (704); Natchitoches, LA
Southland Conference regular season
December 28, 2017; 6:30 p.m.		Nicholls State	L 63–79	5–7 (0–1)	Prather Coliseum (717); Natchitoches, LA
December 30, 2017; 1:00 p.m.		at McNeese State	L 67–72	5–8 (0–2)	Barton Coliseum (782); Lake Charles, LA
January 3, 2018; 6:30 p.m.		Texas A&M–Corpus Christi	L 56–62	5–9 (0–3)	Prather Coliseum (775); Natchitoches, LA
January 6, 2018; 12:30 p.m.		Stephen F. Austin	L 62–70	5–10 (0–4)	Prather Coliseum (1,032); Natchitoches, LA
January 13, 2018; 7:00 p.m.		at Abilene Christian	L 41–80	5–11 (0–5)	Moody Coliseum (1,013); Abilene, TX
January 17, 2018; 4:00 p.m.		Sam Houston State	W 63–60	6–11 (1–5)	Prather Coliseum (1,013); Natchitoches, LA
January 20, 2018; 2:00 p.m.		at Southeastern Louisiana	L 65–71	6–12 (1–6)	University Center (310); Hammond, LA
January 24, 2018; 7:00 p.m.		at New Orleans	L 63–81	6–13 (1–7)	Lakefront Arena (242); New Orleans, LA
January 27, 2018; 1:00 p.m.		Central Arkansas	L 53–61	6–14 (1–8)	Prather Coliseum (1,518); Natchitoches, LA
January 31, 2018; 6:30 p.m.		New Orleans	W 52–47	7–14 (2–8)	Prather Coliseum (510); Natchitoches, LA
February 3, 2018; 1:00 p.m., ESPN3		McNeese State	L 44–60	7–15 (2–9)	Prather Coliseum (1,001); Natchitoches, LA
February 7, 2018; 7:00 p.m., ESPN3		at Lamar	L 44–71	7–16 (2–10)	Montagne Center (848); Beaumont, TX
February 10, 2018; 3:30 p.m., ESPN3		at Stephen F. Austin	L 48–83	7–17 (2–11)	William R. Johnson Coliseum (3,563); Nacogdoches, TX
February 14, 2018; 7:00 p.m.		at Houston Baptist	L 51–57	7–18 (2–12)	Sharp Gymnasium (252); Houston, TX
February 21, 2018; 6:30 p.m.		Incarnate Word	L 53–57	7–19 (2–13)	Prather Coliseum (812); Natchitoches, LA
February 24, 2018; 2:00 p.m.		Southeastern Louisiana	L 54–65	7–20 (2–14)	Prather Coliseum (980); Natchitoches, LA
February 28, 2018; 6:30 p.m.		at Nicholls State	L 53–85	7–21 (2–15)	Stopher Gym (265); Thibodaux, LA
March 3, 2018; 3:00 p.m.		at Central Arkansas	L 39–59	7–22 (2–16)	Farris Center (1,045); Conway, AR
*Non-conference game. ^{#}Rankings from AP poll. (#) Tournament seedings in parentheses. All times are in Central.

== See also ==
- 2017–18 Northwestern State Demons basketball team
