= 2018 Southland Conference women's basketball tournament =

- Classification: Division I
- Season: 2017–18
- Teams: 8
- Site: Merrell Center; Katy, Texas
- Champions: Nicholls State (1st title)
- Winning coach: DoBee Plaisance (1st title)
- MVP: Cassidy Barrios (Nicholls State)
- Television: ESPN3/CBSSN

2017–18 Southland Conference women's basketball standings
	Conf.				Overall
Team	W		L	PCT	W		L	PCT
Lamar	17	–	1	.944	22	–	7	.759
Stephen F. Austin	16	–	2	.889	25	–	6	.806
Central Arkansas	14	–	4	.778	25	–	10	.714
Texas A&M-CC	11	–	7	.611	19	–	12	.613
Nicholls State †	11	–	7	.611	19	–	13	.594
New Orleans	11	–	7	.611	15	–	15	.500
Abilene Christian	9	–	9	.500	16	–	14	.533
McNeese State	8	–	10	.444	12	–	18	.400
Southeastern Louisiana	7	–	11	.389	8	–	21	.276
Houston Baptist	6	–	12	.333	10	–	18	.357
Incarnate Word	4	–	14	.222	5	–	24	.172
Northwestern State	2	–	16	.111	7	–	22	.241
Sam Houston State	1	–	17	.056	4	–	23	.148
† 2018 Southland tournament winner Rankings from AP poll

The 2018 Southland Conference women's basketball tournament, a part of the 2017–18 NCAA Division I women's basketball season, took place March 8–11, 2018 at the Merrell Center in Katy, Texas. The winner of the tournament received the Southland Conference's automatic bid to the 2018 NCAA tournament.

== Seeds and regular season standings ==
Only the top eight teams advanced to the Southland Conference tournament. This chart displays the records and standings of all the teams, providing an explanation for teams that advanced to the conference tourney or finished in certain tiebreaking positions.

2017 Southland Conference women's basketball tournament seeds
Seed	School	Conference record	Overall record (end of regular season)	Tiebreaker
1.	‡* Lamar	17–1	22–6	Southland Conference regular season champions
2.	* Stephen F. Austin	15–2	24–5	2nd Place, regular season
3.	# Central Arkansas	14–4	21–8	3rd Place, regular season
4.	# Nicholls State	11–7	16–13	Group record: NIC was 2–1, A&MCC was 2–1, UNO was 1–3. UNO is No. 6. Two way tie-breaker: NIC was 2–0 vs. UNO. A&MCC was 1–1. NIC gets advantage, No. 4 seed
5.	Texas A&M–Corpus Christi	11–7	18–11	Group record: NIC was 2–1, A&MCC was 2–1, UNO was 1–3. UNO is No. 6. Two way tie-breaker: NIC was 2–0 vs. UNO. A&MCC was 1–1. NIC gets advantage, A&MCC. 5 seed
6.	New Orleans	11–7	15–14	Group record: NIC was 2–1, A&MCC was 2–1, UNO was 1–3. UNO is removed. UNO No. 6
7.	Abilene Christian	9–9	15–13	7th place, regular season
8.	McNeese State	8–10	12–17	8th place, regular season
‡ – Southland Conference regular season champions. * – Receive a first-round and second-round bye in the conference tournament. # – Receive a first-round bye in the conference tournament. Overall record are as of the end of the regular season.

== Schedule ==
Session	Game	Time*	Matchup^{#}	Television
First round – Thursday, March 8
1	1	11:00 am	#5 Texas A&M–Corpus Christi vs. #8 McNeese State	ESPN3
1	2	1:30 pm	#6 New Orleans vs. #7 Abilene Christian	ESPN3
Quarterfinals – Friday, March 9
2	3	11:00 am	#4 Nicholls State vs. #5 Texas A&M–Corpus Christi	ESPN3
2	4	1:30 pm	#3 Central Arkansas vs. #7 Abilene Christian	ESPN3
Semifinals – Saturday, March 10
3	5	1:00 pm	#1 Lamar vs. #4 Nicholls State	ESPN3
3	6	3:30 pm	#2 Stephen F. Austin vs. #3 Central Arkansas	ESPN3
Championship – Sunday, March 11
4	7	12:00 pm	#4 Nicholls State vs. #2 Stephen F. Austin	CBSSN
*Game times in CST. #-Rankings denote tournament seeding.

== Bracket ==
First round Thursday, March 8 ESPN3
5	Texas A&M–Corpus Christi	75
8	McNeese State	52
7	Abilene Christian	88
6	New Orleans	66

Quarterfinals; Friday, March 9 ESPN3
4	Nicholls State	61
5	Texas A&M–Corpus Christi	59
3	Central Arkansas	53
7	Abilene Christian	41

Semifinals; Saturday, March 10; ESPN3
1	Lamar	68
4	Nicholls State	74
2	Stephen F. Austin	70
3	Central Arkansas	60

Championship Game; Sunday, March 11; CBSSN
4	Nicholls State	69
2	Stephen F. Austin	65

== Awards and honors ==
Source: Tournament MVP: Cassidy Barrios, Nicholls
All-Tournament Team:

- Cassidy Barrios, Nicholls
- Stevi Parker, Stephen F. Austin
- Chanell Hayes, Stephen F. Austin
- Tykeria Williams, Nicholls
- Imani Johnson, Stephen F. Austin

== See also ==
- 2018 Southland Conference men's basketball tournament
- Southland Conference women's basketball tournament
