= 2017–18 Sam Houston State Bearkats women's basketball team =

Intercollegiate basketball season

2017–18 Sam Houston State Bearkats women's basketball
- Conference: Southland Conference
- Record: 4–23 (1–17 Southland)
- Head coach: Brenda Welch-Nichols (12th season)
- Assistant coaches: LaToya Bennett; Jaime Gonzalez; Rosalind Jennings
- Home arena: Bernard Johnson Coliseum

2017–18 Southland Conference women's basketball standings
	Conf.				Overall
Team	W		L	PCT	W		L	PCT
Lamar	17	–	1	.944	22	–	7	.759
Stephen F. Austin	16	–	2	.889	25	–	6	.806
Central Arkansas	14	–	4	.778	25	–	10	.714
Texas A&M-CC	11	–	7	.611	19	–	12	.613
Nicholls State †	11	–	7	.611	19	–	13	.594
New Orleans	11	–	7	.611	15	–	15	.500
Abilene Christian	9	–	9	.500	16	–	14	.533
McNeese State	8	–	10	.444	12	–	18	.400
Southeastern Louisiana	7	–	11	.389	8	–	21	.276
Houston Baptist	6	–	12	.333	10	–	18	.357
Incarnate Word	4	–	14	.222	5	–	24	.172
Northwestern State	2	–	16	.111	7	–	22	.241
Sam Houston State	1	–	17	.056	4	–	23	.148
† 2018 Southland tournament winner Rankings from AP poll

The 2017–18 Sam Houston State Bearkats women's basketball team represented Sam Houston State University during the 2017–18 NCAA Division I women's basketball season. The Bearkats, led by twelfth year head coach Brenda Welch-Nichols, played their home games at the Bernard Johnson Coliseum and were members of the Southland Conference. They finished the season 4–23, 1–17 in Southland play to finish in thirteenth place. They failed to qualify for the Southland women's tournament.

On March 7, Welch-Nicholls has agreed "parted ways". She finished at Sam Houston State with a 12 year record of 119–234. On April 12, former Prairie View A&M head coach Ravon Justice was announced as her replacement.

== Roster ==
2017–18 Sam Houston State Bearkats women's basketball team
Players
Coaches

Pos.	#	Name	Height	Year	Previous school	Hometown
G	00	Kevyn Ferriera	5 ft 8 in (1.73 m)	So	Tatum HS; Temple JC	Tatum, NM
G	1	Jennifer Oramas	5 ft 5 in (1.65 m)	So	Charles W. Flannigan HS	Pembroke Pines, FL
G	3	Alyssa Osborne	5 ft 6 in (1.68 m)	Fr	Oakridge HS	Spring, TX
PG	4	Jada Ballew	5 ft 7 in (1.7 m)	Sr	Princeton HS; Rend Lake JC	Columbus, OH
G	5	Dominique Maxwell	5 ft 9 in (1.75 m)	Jr	St. Joseph HS; Odessa JC	Toronto, Canada
G	10	Angela Delaney	5 ft 8 in (1.73 m)	Sr	Harker Heights HS	Harker Heights, TX
G	15	Tia Harston	5 ft 7 in (1.7 m)	So	Killeen HS	Killeen, TX
G	20	Akarian Morgan	5 ft 6 in (1.68 m)	Fr	Cleburne HS	Cleburne, TX
F	21	Lydia Baxter	6 ft 0 in (1.83 m)	Jr	Bowie HS	Austin, TX
F	22	Anastacia Mickens	6 ft 0 in (1.83 m)	Fr	Beaumont Central HS	Beaumont, TX
G	25	Alix Sellers	5 ft 2 in (1.57 m)	Fr	Lumberton HS	Lumberton, TX
F	33	Tehya Hollins	6 ft 0 in (1.83 m)	Fr	Pensacola HS	Pensacola, FL
G	34	Rachell Harrell	5 ft 9 in (1.75 m)	So	Brock HS	Weatherford, TX
C	35	Ashleigh Cooper	6 ft 0 in (1.83 m)	Jr	Hendrickson HS	Pflugerville, TX
F	42	Kiera McKinney	6 ft 2 in (1.88 m)	So	Tascosa HS	Amarillo, TX
F	44	Hannah Knight	6 ft 3 in (1.91 m)	Fr	Floresville HS	Floresville, TX

Head coach

- Brenda Welch-Nichols (Sam Houston State)

Assistant coach(es)

- LaToya Bennett (Sam Houston State)
- Jaime Gonzalez (Sam Houston State)
- Rosalind Jennings (North Greenville)

Legend

- (C) Team captain
- (S) Suspended
- (I) Ineligible
- (W) Walk-on
- Injured
- Current redshirt

Roster
Last update: March 6, 2018

== Schedule ==
Date time, TV	Rank^{#}	Opponent^{#}	Result	Record	Site (attendance) city, state
Non–conference games
11/10/2017*; 10:30 am		at Arkansas	L 54–65	0–1	Bud Walton Arena (4,719); Fayetteville, AR
11/17/2017*; 11:00 am		Wiley College	W 80–41	1–1	Bernard Johnson Coliseum (832); Huntsville, TX
11/21/2017*; 6:30 pm		Rice	L 50–79	1–2	Bernard Johnson Coliseum (554); Huntsville, TX
11/29/2017*; 6:30 pm		Texas Southern	L 58–77	1–3	Bernard Johnson Coliseum (558); Huntsville, TX
12/02/2017*; 11:00 am		St. Thomas (TX)	W 68–66	2–3	Bernard Johnson Coliseum (506); Huntsville, TX
12/12/2017*; 6:30 pm		Jackson State	W 74–68 ^{OT}	3–3	Bernard Johnson Coliseum (513); Huntsville, TX
12/15/2017*; 6:00 pm		at Southern Miss	L 38–58	3–4	Reed Green Coliseum (1,225); Hattiesburg, MS
12/17/2017*; 3:00 pm		Texas State	L 41–73	3–5	Bernard Johnson Coliseum (567); Huntsville, TX
12/27/2017*; 6:30 pm		at LSU	L 58–71	3–6	Maravich Center (1,746); Baton Rouge, LA
Southland Conference regular season
12/30/2017; 2:00 pm		at Abilene Christian	L 65–83	3–7 (0–1)	Moody Coliseum (1,028); Abilene, TX
01/03/2018; 7:00 pm		at Central Arkansas	L 44–69	3–8 (0–2)	Farris Center (412); Conway, AR
01/06/2018; 3:00 pm		Incarnate Word	L 49–56	3–9 (0–3)	Bernard Johnson Coliseum (583); Huntsville, TX
01/10/2018; 6:30 pm		Texas A&M–Corpus Christi	L 57–67	3–10 (0–4)	Bernard Johnson Coliseum (533); Huntsville, TX
01/13/2018; 3:00 pm		Houston Baptist	L 61–69	3–11 (0–5)	Bernard Johnson Coliseum (946); Huntsville, TX
01/17/2018; 4:00 pm		at Northwestern State	L 60–63	3–12 (0–6)	Prather Coliseum (1,013); Natchitoches, LA
01/20/2018; 2:00 pm, ESPN3		at Lamar	L 44–91	3–13 (0–7)	Montagne Center (904); Beaumont, TX
01/24/2018; 7:00 pm		at Southeastern Louisiana	W 57–52	4–13 (1–7)	University Center (610); Hammond, LA
01/27/2018; 3:30 pm		at Stephen F. Austin	L 53–75	4–14 (1–8)	William R. Johnson Coliseum (4,182); Nacogdoches, TX
01/31/2018; 6:30 pm, ESPN3		McNeese State	L 63–66	4–15 (1–9)	Bernard Johnson Coliseum (759); Huntsville, TX
02/03/2018; 2:00 pm, ESPN3		Abilene Christian	L 72–75	4–16 (1–10)	Bernard Johnson Coliseum (1,078); Huntsville, TX
02/07/2018; 1:00 pm		at Texas A&M–Corpus Christi	L 57–67	4–17 (1–11)	Dugan Wellness Center (883); Corpus Christi, TX
02/10/2018; 2:00 pm, ESPN3		Lamar	L 44–68	4–18 (1–12)	Bernard Johnson Coliseum (1,166); Huntsville, TX
02/14/2018; 6:30 pm, ESPN3		Nicholls State	L 65–70	4–19 (1–13)	Bernard Johnson Coliseum (741); Huntsville, TX
02/17/2018; 2:00 pm		at Houston Baptist	L 62–65 ^{OT}	4–20 (1–14)	Sharp Gymnasium (597); Houston, TX
02/28/2018; 6:30 pm, ESPN3		Central Arkansas	L 53–73	4–26 (1–16)	Bernard Johnson Coliseum (758); Huntsville, TX
03/03/2018; 4:30 pm, ESPN3		Stephen F. Austin	L 49–72	4–27 (1–17)	Bernard Johnson Coliseum (610); Huntsville, TX
*Non-conference game. ^{#}Rankings from AP Poll. (#) Tournament seedings in parentheses. All times are in Central Time.

== See also ==
2017–18 Sam Houston State Bearkats men's basketball team
