= 2017–18 Incarnate Word Cardinals women's basketball team =

Intercollegiate basketball season

2017–18 Incarnate Word Cardinals women's basketball
- Conference: Southland Conference
- Record: 5–24 (4–14 Southland)
- Head coach: Christy Smith (2nd season)
- Assistant coaches: Betsy Adams; John Clark; Marvin Walker
- Home arena: McDermott Center (Capacity: 2,000)

2017–18 Southland Conference women's basketball standings
	Conf.				Overall
Team	W		L	PCT	W		L	PCT
Lamar	17	–	1	.944	22	–	7	.759
Stephen F. Austin	16	–	2	.889	25	–	6	.806
Central Arkansas	14	–	4	.778	25	–	10	.714
Texas A&M-CC	11	–	7	.611	19	–	12	.613
Nicholls State †	11	–	7	.611	19	–	13	.594
New Orleans	11	–	7	.611	15	–	15	.500
Abilene Christian	9	–	9	.500	16	–	14	.533
McNeese State	8	–	10	.444	12	–	18	.400
Southeastern Louisiana	7	–	11	.389	8	–	21	.276
Houston Baptist	6	–	12	.333	10	–	18	.357
Incarnate Word	4	–	14	.222	5	–	24	.172
Northwestern State	2	–	16	.111	7	–	22	.241
Sam Houston State	1	–	17	.056	4	–	23	.148
† 2018 Southland tournament winner Rankings from AP poll

The 2017–18 Incarnate Word Cardinals women's basketball team represented the University of the Incarnate Word in the 2017-18 NCAA Division I women's basketball season. They were led by coach Christy Smith, in her second season. The Cardinals finished the season 5–24, 4–14 in Southland play to finish in eleventh place. They failed to qualify for the Southland women's tournament.

== Roster ==
2017–18 Incarnate Word Cardinals women's basketball team
Players
Coaches

Pos.	#	Name	Height	Year	Previous school	Hometown
G/F	1	Laci Hawthorne	5 ft 11 in (1.8 m)	Fr	Boswell HS	Fort Worth, TX
G	3	Alexandra Busby-Leija	5 ft 8 in (1.73 m)	So	Southwest HS	San Antonio, TX
G	4	Gabbi Bowie	5 ft 8 in (1.73 m)	RS Jr	Johnson HS; University of Utah	San Antonio, TX
SG	5	Kara Speer	5 ft 9 in (1.75 m)	Fr	Metro Christian Academy	Tulsa, OK
G	10	Haley Frias	5 ft 8 in (1.73 m)	Sr	Georgetown HS	Georgetown, TX
G	11	Imani Robinson	5 ft 11 in (1.8 m)	So	Cedar Ridge HS	Round Rock, TX
PG	12	Melina Merritt	5 ft 7 in (1.7 m)	Sr	Cedar Ridge HS	Round Rock, TX
G	14	Camille Cunningham	5 ft 6 in (1.68 m)	Fr	Steele HS	Cibolo, TX
F	15	Sydnee Wynn	6 ft 3 in (1.91 m)	Fr	Eustace HS	Mabank, TX
F	20	Charmaine McBride	5 ft 9 in (1.75 m)	So	Vista Ridge HS	Cedar Park, TX
G	22	Liz Holter	5 ft 9 in (1.75 m)	Fr	Seton Catholic Prep	Gilbert, AZ
C	24	Quincy Baker	6 ft 2 in (1.88 m)	RS Jr	Klein HS	Houston, TX
G/F	25	Brooke Bailey	5 ft 11 in (1.8 m)	Fr	Bishop Lynch HS	Dallas, TX
F	32	Olivia Noah	6 ft 1 in (1.85 m)	Fr	Cy-Fair HS	Cypress, TX
F	33	Kandyce Shepard	6 ft 2 in (1.88 m)	Fr	Westwood HS	Round Rock, TX

Head coach

Christy Smith

Assistant coach(es)

Betsy Adams
John Clark
Marvin Walker

Legend

- (C) Team captain
- (S) Suspended
- (I) Ineligible
- (W) Walk-on
- Injured
- Current redshirt

Roster
Last update: January 17, 2018

== Schedule ==
Date time, TV	Opponent	Result	Record	High points	High rebounds	High assists	Site (attendance) city, state
Non-conference regular season
November 10*; 11:00 a.m.	at Oklahoma State	L 35–86	0–1	12 – Robinson	5 – Robinson	2 – Frias	Gallagher-Iba Arena (3,935); Stillwater, OK
November 11*; 2:30 p.m., ESPN3	at Texas–Arlington	L 48–61	0–2	9 – Baker	6 – Baker	3 – Merritt	College Park Center (1,972); Arlington, TX
November 15*; 6:00 p.m.	Texas State	L 33–74	0–3	9 – Bowie	10 – Wynn	2 – Merritt	McDermott Center (1,000); San Antonio, TX
November 20*; 6:00 p.m.	Mary Hardin–Baylor	W 76–58	1–3	23 – Robinson	7 – Wynn	8 – Holter	McDermott Center (847); San Antonio, TX
November 24*; 4:30 p.m.	at Utah	L 31–90	1–4	9 – Holter	5 – Bowie	1 – Bowie	Jon M. Huntsman Center (1,104); Salt Lake City, UT
November 25*; 3:00 p.m.	at Weber State	L 55–79	1–5	17 – Robinson	10 – Wynn	3 – Merritt	Dee Events Center (523); Ogden, UT
November 29*; 6:00 p.m.	UMass	L 45–64	1–6	17 – Bowie	7 – Wynn	3 – Holter	McDermott Center (521); San Antonio, TX
December 4*; 6:00 p.m.	South Dakota	L 51–81	1–7	20 – Wynn	11 – Wynn	3 – Wynn	McDermott Center (499); San Antonio, TX
December 9*; 2:00 p.m., CUSATV	at Rice	L 43–60	1–8	12 – Wynn	9 – Wynn	2 – Robinson	Tudor Fieldhouse (562); Houston, TX
December 18*; 12:00 p.m.	at Houston	L 67–98	1–9	13 – Wynn	7 – Baker	4 – Merritt	Health and Physical Education Arena (260); Houston, TX
December 21*; 2:00 p.m.	at Texas Tech	L 54–80	1–10	17 – Robinson	9 – Robinson	6 – Frias	United Supermarkets Arena (3,384); Lubbock, TX
Southland regular season
December 28; 6:00 p.m.	McNeese State	L 57–66	1–11 (0–1)	19 – Robinson	7 – Baker	5 – Robinson	McDermott Center (356); San Antonio, TX
December 30; 1:00 p.m.	Nicholls State	W 64–62	2–11 (1–1)	14 – Robinson	16 – Wynn	3 – Merritt	McDermott Center (352); San Antonio, TX
January 6; 3:00 p.m.	at Sam Houston State	W 56–49	3–11 (2–1)	18 – Bowie	6 – Bowie	4 – Bowie	Bernard Johnson Coliseum (583); Huntsville, TX
January 10; 6:00 p.m.	Central Arkansas	L 35–57	3–12 (2–2)	14 – Robinson	7 – Robinson	2 – Robinson	McDermott Center (791); San Antonio, TX
January 13; 3:30 p.m., ESPN3	at Stephen F. Austin	L 49–60	3–13 (2–3)	14 – Robinson	11 – Wynn	3 – Merritt	William R. Johnson Coliseum (1,237); Nacogdoches, TX
January 18 (Note: The Cardinals' first meeting with Lamar was originally scheduled for Wednesday, January 17, but was postponed to the next day due to icy conditions.); 7:00 p.m., ESPN3	at Lamar	L 54–77	3–14 (2–4)	16 – Robinson	7 – Wynn	3 – Frias	Montagne Center (556); Beaumont, TX
January 20; 4:00 p.m., ESPN3	at New Orleans	L 50–52	3–15 (2–5)	11 – Robinson	16 – Wynn	3 – Holter	Lakefront Arena (584); New Orleans, LA
January 24; 6:00 p.m.	Houston Baptist	L 56–58	3–16 (2–6)	22 – Robinson	12 – Robinson	5 – Frias	McDermott Center (626); San Antonio, TX
January 27; 11:00 a.m.	New Orleans	L 45–72	3–17 (2–7)	11 – Robinson	5 – Tied	3 – Merrit	McDermott Center (799); San Antonio, TX
February 3; 1:00 p.m.	Texas A&M–Corpus Christi	L 58–62	3–18 (2–8)	15 – Robinson	8 – Tied	6 – Robinson	McDermott Center (1,211); San Antonio, TX
February 7; 7:00 p.m.	at Southeastern Louisiana	L 54–65	3–19 (2–9)	11 – Noah	5 – Tied	3 – Bowie	University Center (415); Hammond, LA
February 10; 2:00 p.m.	at Abilene Christian	L 56–58	3–20 (2–10)	23 – Robinson	7 – Baker	6 – Merritt	Moody Coliseum (1,029); Abilene, TX
February 14; 6:00 p.m.	Lamar	L 47–71	3–21 (2–11)	13 – Robinson	9 – Baker	3 – Holter	McDermott Center (388); San Antonio, TX
February 17; 1:00 p.m.	Stephen F. Austin	L 50–75	3–22 (2–12)	15 – Robinson	6 – Baker	3 – Tied	McDermott Center (599); San Antonio, TX
February 21; 6:30 p.m.	at Northwestern State	W 57–53	4–22 (3–12)	14 – Bowie	7 – Tied	5 – Merritt	Prather Coliseum (812); Natchitoches, LA
February 24; 11:30 a.m.	at Texas A&M–Corpus Christi	L 59–75	4–23 (3–13)	16 – Baker	5 – Tied	5 – Robinson	American Bank Center; Corpus Christi, TX
February 28; 7:00 p.m.	at Houston Baptist	L 56–67	4–24 (3–14)	18 – Robinson	5 – Hawthorne	2 – Tied	Sharp Gymnasium (330); Houston, TX
March 3; 1:00 p.m.	Abilene Christian	W 58–46	5–24 (4–14)	22 – Robinson	14 – Baker	3 – Robinson	McDermott Center (1,788); San Antonio, TX
*Non-conference game. ^{#}Rankings from AP Poll. (#) Tournament seedings in parentheses. All times are in Central.

- Schedule source:

== See also ==
- 2017–18 Incarnate Word Cardinals men's basketball team
