= 2016–17 Abilene Christian Wildcats women's basketball team =

Intercollegiate basketball season

2016–17 Abilene Christian Wildcats women's basketball

Co–Southland Regular Season Champions

WNIT, Second Round
- Conference: Southland Conference
- Record: 23–9 (16–2 Southland)
- Head coach: Julie Goodenough (5th season)
- Assistant coaches: Erika Lambert; Kyle Felan; Erik Deroo
- Home arena: Moody Coliseum

2016–17 Southland Conference women's basketball standings
	Conf.				Overall
Team	W		L	PCT	W		L	PCT
Central Arkansas†	16	–	2	.889	26	–	5	.839
Abilene Christian*	16	–	2	.889	23	–	9	.719
Lamar	15	–	3	.833	22	–	8	.733
Stephen F. Austin	14	–	4	.778	25	–	8	.758
New Orleans	9	–	9	.500	14	–	15	.483
McNeese State	8	–	10	.444	14	–	17	.452
Texas A&M-CC	8	–	10	.444	14	–	18	.438
Northwestern State	7	–	11	.389	13	–	17	.433
Nicholls State	7	–	11	.389	10	–	20	.333
Incarnate Word*	7	–	11	.389	9	–	20	.310
Houston Baptist	4	–	14	.222	6	–	22	.214
SE Louisiana	3	–	15	.167	5	–	24	.172
Sam Houston State	3	–	15	.167	3	–	25	.107
† 2017 Southland tournament winner As of March 20, 2017 *ineligible for conference and NCAA tournament postseason play due to Div. I transition Rankings from AP poll

The 2016–17 Abilene Christian Wildcats women's basketball team represented Abilene Christian University during the 2016–17 NCAA Division I women's basketball season. The Wildcats, led by fourth-year head coach Julie Goodenough, played their home games at the Moody Coliseum. This was the fourth year of a four-year transition phase from D2 to D1. In the fourth year of transition, Abilene Christian could not participate in the Southland Tournament, but was a Division I counter and was part of the Division I RPI calculation. The Wildcats played a full conference schedule in 2016–17. Although they were not eligible for the Southland Conference and NCAA tournaments, the Wildcats were invited to play in the 2017 Women's National Invitation Tournament. The Wildcats had a 1–1 record in the tournament, winning the first-round game against the Oklahoma State Cowgirls and losing the second-round game to the SMU Mustangs. They finished the season 23–9, 16–2 and tied for the Southland Conference regular season championship title.

== Roster ==
2016–17 Abilene Christian Wildcats women's basketball team
Players
Coaches

Pos.	#	Name	Height	Year	Previous school	Hometown
G/F	3	Dominique Golightly	5 ft 11 in (1.8 m)	Fr	Chickasha HS	Chickasha, Oklahoma
G	10	Breanna Wright	5 ft 8 in (1.73 m)	Fr	Jarrell HS	Jarrell, Texas
G	11	Sara Williamson	5 ft 10 in (1.78 m)	So	Rockwall HS	Rowlett, Texas
C	13	Taudenciah Oluoch	6 ft 3 in (1.91 m)	Jr	Shimba Hills HS	Nairobi, Kenya
G	14	Pamela Herrera	5 ft 6 in (1.68 m)	Fr	Bel Air HS	El Paso, Texas
G	15	Alexis Mason	5 ft 9 in (1.75 m)	Sr	McKinney North HS	McKinney, Texas
C	22	Sierra Allen	6 ft 1 in (1.85 m)	Jr	Roscoe Highland HS	Roscoe, Texas
F	23	Suzzy Dimba	5 ft 11 in (1.8 m)	Sr	Lubbuck Coronado HS	Lubbock, Texas
C	25	Lexi Kirgan	6 ft 4 in (1.93 m)	Fr	Bullard HS	Bullard, Texas
F	32	Lizzy Dimba	5 ft 11 in (1.8 m)	Sr	Lubbuck Coronado HS	Lubbock, Texas
F	33	Sydney Shelstead	6 ft 1 in (1.85 m)	Sr	Mineral Wells HS	Mineral Wells, Texas
G	42	Hannah Snyder	5 ft 5 in (1.65 m)	Fr	Albany HS	Albany, Texas

Head coach

- Julie Goodenough (Abilene Christian)

Assistant coach(es)

- Erika Lambert (College of Charleston)
- Kyle Felan (Texas A&M)
- Erik Deroo (Fresno State)

Legend

- (C) Team captain
- (S) Suspended
- (I) Ineligible
- (W) Walk-on
- Injured
- Current redshirt

Roster
Last update: September 12, 2018

== Schedule ==
Date time, TV	Rank^{#}	Opponent^{#}	Result	Record	Site (attendance) city, state
Exhibition schedule
Nov 7, 2016*; 7:00 pm		McMurry	W 97–46		Moody Coliseum (1,250); Abilene, Texas
Non–conference schedule
Nov 11, 2016*; 7:00 pm		at Missouri; Preseason Women's NIT	L 46–52	0–1	Mizzou Arena (2,056); Columbia, MO
Nov 15, 2016*; 7:00 pm		Howard Payne	W 87–52	1–1	Moody Coliseum (1,250); Abilene, Texas
Nov 18, 2016*; 6:00 pm		Omaha; Preseason Women's NIT	W 73–66	2–1	Moody Coliseum (892); Abilene, Texas
Nov 19, 2016*; 6:00 pm		Texas–Rio Grande Valley; Preseason Women's NIT	W 70–54	3–1	Moody Coliseum (774); Abilene, Texas
Nov 26, 2016*; 6:00 pm		at Texas A&M	L 55–71	3–2	Reed Arena (3,339); College Station, TX
Nov 29, 2016*; 7:00 pm		at UTSA	L 68–71	3–3	Convocation Center (392); San Antonio, TX
Dec 1, 2016*; 7:00 pm		at Baylor	L 34–79	3–4	Ferrell Center (5,415); Waco, TX
Dec 3, 2016*; 2:00 pm		UMKC	L 68–71 ^{OT}	3–5	Moody Coliseum (1,150); Abilene, TX
Dec 10, 2016*; 2:00 pm		Harding	W 74–62	4–5	Moody Coliseum (750); Abilene, TX
Dec 16, 2016*; 7:00 pm		at Wichita State	L 62–81	4–6	Charles Koch Arena (1,470); Wichita, KS
Dec 17, 2016*; 11:00 am		vs. Murray State	W 81–57	5–6	Charles Koch Arena (1,427); Wichita, KS
Dec 28, 2016*; 2:00 pm		Sul Ross	W 106–58	6–6	Moody Coliseum (750); Abilene, TX
Southland Conference schedule
Dec 31, 2016; 12:00 pm		at Southeastern Louisiana	W 82–57	7–6 (1–0)	University Center (469); Hammond, Louisiana
Jan 3, 2017; 7:00 pm		New Orleans	W 68–55	8–6 (2–0)	Moody Coliseum (1,113); Abilene, TX
Jan 7, 2017; 2:00 pm		Central Arkansas	W 83–76	9–6 (3–0)	Moody Coliseum (1,117); Abilene, Texas
Jan 12, 2017; 5:30 pm		Stephen F. Austin	L 61–70	9–7 (3–1)	Moody Coliseum (1,127); Abilene, TX
Jan 14, 2017; 2:00 pm		Lamar	W 77–59	10–7 (4–1)	Moody Coliseum (1,014); Abilene, Texas
Jan 18, 2017; 6:00 pm		at Nicholls	W 89–73	11–7 (5–1)	Stopher Gym (488); Thibodaux, LA
Jan 26, 2017; 5:30 pm		at Incarnate Word	W 75–66	12–7 (6–1)	McDermott Convocation Center (692); San Antonio, TX
Jan 23, 2017; 2:00 pm		McNeese State	W 77–65	13–7 (7–1)	Moody Coliseum (1,078); Abilene, TX
Feb 1, 2017; 5:30 pm		at Texas A&M–Corpus Christi	W 72–59	14–7 (8–1)	Moody Coliseum (937); Abilene, Texas
Feb 4, 2017; 2:00 pm		Sam Houston State	W 78–56	15–7 (9–1)	Moody Coliseum (1,094); Abilene, Texas
Feb 8, 2017; 7:00 pm		at Central Arkansas	L 70–80	15–8 (9–2)	Farris Center (689); Conway, AR
Feb 11, 2017; 2:00 pm		Northwestern State	W 79–57	16–8 (10–2)	Moody Coliseum (1,155); Abilene, TX
Feb 16, 2017; 5:30 pm		at Stephen F. Austin	W 80–73	17–8 (11–2)	William R. Johnson Coliseum (1,522); Nacogdoches, TX
Feb 18, 2017; 1:00 pm		at Northwestern State	W 75–74	18–8 (12–2)	Prather Coliseum (632); Natchitoches, LA
Feb 22, 2017; 5:30 pm		Texas A&M–Corpus Christi	W 72–64	19–8 (13–2)	Moody Coliseum (1,122); Abilene, Texas
Feb 25, 2017; 4:00 pm		at Sam Houston State	W 72–39	20–8 (14–2)	Bernard Johnson Coliseum; Huntsville, TX
Mar 1, 2017; 5:20 pm		Incarnate Word	W 68–45	21–8 (15–2)	Moody Coliseum (1,226); Abilene, Texas
Mar 4, 2017; 3:30 pm		at Houston Baptist	W 89–60	22–8 (16–2)	Sharp Gymnasium (620); Houston, TX
WNIT
Mar 16, 2017*; 7:00 pm		at Oklahoma State; First Round	W 66–56	23–8	Gallagher-Iba Arena (1,423); Stillwater, OK
Mar 20, 2017*; 7:00 pm		at SMU; Second Round	L 52–59	23–9	Moody Coliseum (1,210); University Park, TX
*Non-conference game. ^{#}Rankings from AP Poll. (#) Tournament seedings in parentheses. All times are in Central Time.

== See also ==
- 2016–17 Abilene Christian Wildcats men's basketball team
