= 2016–17 Central Arkansas Sugar Bears basketball team =

Intercollegiate basketball season

2016–17 Central Arkansas Sugar Bears basketball

Co-Southland Conference regular season Southland Tournament Champions

NCAA tournament, first round
- Conference: Southland Conference
- Record: 26–5 (16–2 Southland)
- Head coach: Sandra Rushing (5th season)
- Assistant coaches: Greg Long; Shameka Thomas; Arissa Jackson
- Home arena: Farris Center

2016–17 Southland Conference women's basketball standings
	Conf.				Overall
Team	W		L	PCT	W		L	PCT
Central Arkansas†	16	–	2	.889	26	–	5	.839
Abilene Christian*	16	–	2	.889	23	–	9	.719
Lamar	15	–	3	.833	22	–	8	.733
Stephen F. Austin	14	–	4	.778	25	–	8	.758
New Orleans	9	–	9	.500	14	–	15	.483
McNeese State	8	–	10	.444	14	–	17	.452
Texas A&M-CC	8	–	10	.444	14	–	18	.438
Northwestern State	7	–	11	.389	13	–	17	.433
Nicholls State	7	–	11	.389	10	–	20	.333
Incarnate Word*	7	–	11	.389	9	–	20	.310
Houston Baptist	4	–	14	.222	6	–	22	.214
SE Louisiana	3	–	15	.167	5	–	24	.172
Sam Houston State	3	–	15	.167	3	–	25	.107
† 2017 Southland tournament winner As of March 20, 2017 *ineligible for conference and NCAA tournament postseason play due to Div. I transition Rankings from AP poll

The 2016–17 Central Arkansas Sugar Bears basketball team represented the University of Central Arkansas during the 2016–17 NCAA Division I women's basketball season. The Sugar Bears were led by fifth-year head coach Sandra Rushing and played their home games at the Farris Center as members of the Southland Conference. They finished the season 26–5, 16–2, tied for first place in conference play. They were champions of the Southland women's tournament. They received an invitation to the NCAA tournament, marking their second consecutive NCAA tournament appearance. Their season ended in the first round with a loss to the Texas Longhorns.

== Schedule ==
Date time, TV	Rank^{#}	Opponent^{#}	Result	Record	Site (attendance) city, state
Non-conference regular schedule
Nov 11, 2016*; 6:00 pm		Hendrix College	W 71–39	1–0	Farris Center (876); Conway, AR
Nov 13, 2016*; 6:00 pm		at Texas A&M	L 49–74	1–1	Reed Arena (3,030); College Station, TX
Nov 17, 2016*; 5:30 pm		at Alcorn State	W 71–57	2–1	Davey Whitney Complex (503); Lorman, MS
Nov 22, 2016*; 6:00 pm		Williams Baptist College	W 82–32	3–1	Farris Center; Conway, AR
Nov 29, 2016*; 5:00 pm		Alcorn State	W 59–45	4–1	Farris Center; Conway, AR
Dec 2, 2016*; 6:00 pm		Crowley's Ridge College	W 102–31	5–1	Farris Center; Conway, AR
Dec 12, 2016*; 2:00 pm		Central Baptist College	W 94–47	6–1	Farris Center; Conway, AR
Dec 14, 2016*; 5:30 pm		at Texas Tech	L 45–79	6–2	United Supermarkets Arena; Lubbock, TX
Dec 19, 2016*; 4:00 pm		vs. Liberty; UTSA Tournament	W 61–41	7–2	Convocation Center; San Antonio, TX
Dec 20, 2016*; 4:00 pm		vs. Houston; UTSA Tournament	W 69–55	8–2	Convocation Center; San Antonio, TX
Southland Conference schedule
Dec 31, 2016; 2:00 pm		Lamar	L 56–70	8–3 (0–1)	Farris Center; Conway, AR
Jan 2, 2017; 6:00 pm		Northwestern State	W 76–43	9–3 (1–1)	Farris Center; Conway, AR
Jan 7, 2017; 2:00 pm		at Abilene Christian	L 76–83	9–4 (1–2)	Abilene Christian; Abilene, TX
Jan 11, 2017; 1:00 pm		at Houston Baptist	W 80–49	10–4 (2–2)	Sharp Gymnasium; Houston, TX
Jan 14, 2017; 4:30 pm		at Texas A&M–Corpus Christi	W 49–41	11–4 (3–2)	Dugan Wellness Center (752); Corpus Christi, TX
Jan 18, 2017; 6:00 pm		McNeese State	W 67–52	12–4 (4–2)	Farris Center; Conway, AR
Jan 21, 2017; 4:00 pm		at New Orleans	W 55–51	13–4 (5–2)	Lakefront Arena; New Orleans, LA
Jan 25, 2017; 5:30 pm, ESPN3		at Stephen F. Austin	W 67–63	14–4 (6–2)	William R. Johnson Coliseum; Nacogdoches, TX
Jan 28, 2017; 2:00 pm		Incarnate Word	W 63–50	15–4 (7–2)	Farris Center; Conway, AR
Jan 31, 2017; 5:30 pm		at McNeese State	W 72–49	16–4 (8–2)	Burton Coliseum; Lake Charles, LA
Feb 4, 2017; 2:00 pm		Southeastern Louisiana	W 77–55	17–4 (9–2)	Farris Center; Conway, AR
Feb 8, 2017; 7:00 pm		Abilene Christian	W 80–70	18–4 (10–2)	Farris Center; Conway, AR
Feb 11, 2017; 1:00 pm		at Nicholls State	W 61–52	19–4 (11–2)	Stopher Gym; Thibodaux, LA
Feb 15, 2017; 7:00 pm		Sam Houston State	W 75–48	20–4 (12–2)	Farris Center; Conway, AR
Feb 18, 2017; 2:00 pm		Houston Baptist	W 83–39	21–4 (13–2)	Farris Center; Conway, AR
Feb 22, 2017; 5:30 pm		at Southeastern Louisiana	W 78–64	22–4 (14–2)	University Center; Hammond, LA
Feb 25, 2017; 4:00 pm		Stephen F. Austin	W 70–58	23–4 (15–2)	Farris Center; Conway, AR
Mar 4, 2017; 1:00 pm		at Northwestern State	W 62–51	24–4 (16–2)	Prather Coliseum; Natchitoches, LA
Southland Women's Tournament
Mar 11, 2017; 1:00 pm, ESPN3	(1)	vs. (5) Texas A&M–Corpus Christi; Semifinals	W 62–44	25–4	Merrell Center; Katy, TX
Mar 12, 2017; 12:00 pm, CBSSN	(1)	vs. (3) Stephen F. Austin; Finals	W 60–35	26–4	Merrell Center; Katy, TX
WBI
Mar 17, 2017*; 1:30 pm		at Texas; First Round	L 50–78	26–5	Frank Erwin Center; Austin, TX
*Non-conference game. ^{#}Rankings from AP Poll. (#) Tournament seedings in parentheses. All times are in Central Time.

== See also ==
- 2016–17 Central Arkansas Bears basketball team
