= 2017 Southland Conference women's basketball tournament =

- Classification: Division I
- Season: 2016–17
- Teams: 8
- Site: Merrell Center; Katy, Texas
- Champions: Central Arkansas (2nd title)
- Winning coach: Sandra Rushing (2nd title)
- MVP: Maggie Proffitt (Central Arkansas)
- Television: ESPN3/CBSSN

2016–17 Southland Conference women's basketball standings
	Conf.				Overall
Team	W		L	PCT	W		L	PCT
Central Arkansas†	16	–	2	.889	26	–	5	.839
Abilene Christian*	16	–	2	.889	23	–	9	.719
Lamar	15	–	3	.833	22	–	8	.733
Stephen F. Austin	14	–	4	.778	25	–	8	.758
New Orleans	9	–	9	.500	14	–	15	.483
McNeese State	8	–	10	.444	14	–	17	.452
Texas A&M-CC	8	–	10	.444	14	–	18	.438
Northwestern State	7	–	11	.389	13	–	17	.433
Nicholls State	7	–	11	.389	10	–	20	.333
Incarnate Word*	7	–	11	.389	9	–	20	.310
Houston Baptist	4	–	14	.222	6	–	22	.214
SE Louisiana	3	–	15	.167	5	–	24	.172
Sam Houston State	3	–	15	.167	3	–	25	.107
† 2017 Southland tournament winner As of March 20, 2017 *ineligible for conference and NCAA tournament postseason play due to Div. I transition Rankings from AP poll

The 2017 Southland Conference women's basketball tournament, a part of the 2016–17 NCAA Division I women's basketball season, took place March 9–12, 2017 at the Merrell Center in Katy, Texas. The winner of the tournament, the Central Arkansas Sugar Bears, received the Southland Conference's automatic bid to the 2017 NCAA tournament.

== Seeds and regular season standings ==
Only the Top 8 teams advanced to the Southland Conference tournament. The co-regular season champion Abilene Christian Wildcats were ineligible for the NCAA Tourney. Their seed fell to the next eligible team. Abilene Christian and Incarnate Word were ineligible for post-season play as they were in the final year of a 4-year transition from D2 to D1. They will be eligible for the Southland tourney in 2018. This chart shows all the teams records and standings and explains why teams advanced to the conference tourney or finished in certain tiebreaking positions.

2017 Southland Conference women's basketball tournament seeds
Seed	School	Conference record	Overall record (end of regular season)	Tiebreaker
1.	Central Arkansas	16-2	24–4	
2.	Lamar	15-3	22-6	
3.	Stephen F. Austin	14–4	23–6	
4.	New Orleans	9-9	14-14	
5.	Texas A&M-CC	8-10	12-17	1-0 vs. McNeese State
6.	McNeese State	8-10	13–16	0-1 vs. TXAMCC
7.	Northwestern State	7-11	13-16	2-0 vs. Nicholls State/Incarnate Word
8.	Nicholls State	7-11	10-19	Incarnate Word still in-eligible
‡ – Southland Conference regular season champions. * – Received a first-round and second-round bye in the conference tournament. # – Received a first-round bye in the conference tournament. Overall record are as of the end of the regular season.

== Schedule ==
Session	Game	Time*	Matchup^{#}	Television
First round – Thursday, March 9
1	1	11:00 am	#5 Texas A&M-CC vs. #8 Nicholls State	ESPN3
1	2	1:30 pm	#6 McNeese State vs. #7 Northwestern State	ESPN3
Quarterfinals – Friday, March 10
2	3	11:00 am	#4 New Orleans vs. #5 Texas A&M-CC	ESPN3
2	4	1:30 pm	#3 Stephen F. Austin vs. #6 McNeese State	ESPN3
Semifinals – Saturday, March 11
3	5	1:00 pm	#1 Central Arkansas vs. #5 Texas A&M CC	ESPN3
3	6	3:30 pm	#2 Lamar vs. #3 SFA	ESPN3
Championship – Sunday, March 12
4	7	12:00 pm	#1 Central Arkansas vs. #3 SFA	CBSSN
*Game times in CST. #-Rankings denote tournament seeding.

== Bracket ==
First round Thursday, March 9 ESPN3
5	Texas A&M-CC	57
8	Northwestern State	46
7	Nicholls	58
6	McNeese State	79

Quarterfinals; Friday, March 10; ESPN3
4	New Orleans	77
5	Texas A&M-CC	88
3	Stephen F. Austin	77
6	McNeese State	63

Semifinals; Saturday, March 11; ESPN3
1	Central Arkansas	62
5	Texas A&M CC	44
2	Lamar	48
3	Stephen F. Austin	62

Championship Game; Sunday, March 12; CBSSN
1	Central Arkansas	60
3	Stephen F. Austin	35

=== First round ===
ESPN3

March 9
11:00 am

Northwestern State 46, Texas A&M-CC 57
Scoring by half: 20–16, 26–41
Pts: C. Brown; B. Attura: 16; Rebs: S. Abboud: 5 Asts: 3 players: 2	Pts: D. Booth: 14; Rebs: C. Davis: 11; Asts: B. Mbamalu; C. Davis: 4

Merrell Center
Katy, TX
Referees: Robert Strong, Marlin Ramsey, Chaney Muench

ESPN3

March 9
1:30 pm

Nicholls 58, McNeese State 79
Scoring by half: 21–37, 35–44
Pts: C. Barrios: 17; Rebs: E. White; T. Morrison: 5 Asts: T. Morrison: 2	Pts: F. Haywood: 14; Rebs: F. Haywood: 19; Asts: F. Haywood; C. Davis: 3

Merrell Center
Katy, TX
Attendance: 604
Referees: Travis Jones, Darren McClure, Jennifer White

=== Quarterfinals ===
ESPN3

March 10
11:00 am

Texas A&M-CC 88, New Orleans 77
Scoring by half: 42–46, 28–49
Pts: K. Jones: 26; Rebs: C. Davis: 11; Asts: Three Players: 2	Pts: R. Brown: 21; Rebs: S. Woods: 8 Asts: D. Wright: 5

Merrell Center
Katy, TX
Referees: Travis Jones, Kelly Johnson, Darren McClure

ESPN3

March 10
1:30 pm

McNeese State 63, Stephen F. Austin 77
Scoring by half: 20–43, 41–36
Pts: V. Rachal: 23; Rebs: F. Haywood: 15; Asts: Three Players: 3	Pts: T. Ross: 24; Rebs: S. Parker: 14; Asts: T. Ross: 4

Merrell Center
Katy, TX
Attendance: 966
Referees: Eric Koch, Chaney Muench, Britton Sherry

=== Semifinals ===
ESPN3

March 11
1:00 pm

Texas A&M-CC 44, Central Arkansas 62
Scoring by half: 20–24, 29–33
Pts: K. Jones: 13; Rebs: U. Jolivette; B. Mbamalu: 5 Asts: Six Players: 1	Pts: M. Proffitt: 21; Rebs: T. Baudoin: 13; Asts: B. Mullins: 6

Merrell Center
Katy, TX
Referees: Travis Jones, D'Lynn Schertz, Darren McClure

ESPN3

March 11
3:30 pm

Stephen F. Austin 62, Lamar 48
Scoring by half: 30–32, 26–22
Pts: T. Ross: 20; Rebs: S. Parker: 13; Asts: T. Ross: 3	Pts: Four Players: 8 Rebs: K. Bowers: 13; Asts: C. Barrs; A. Miles: 3

Merrell Center
Katy, TX
Attendance: 1,413
Referees: John Fletcher, Britton Sherry, Shandra Twine

=== Championship ===
CBSSN

March 12
12:00 pm

Stephen F. Austin 35, Central Arkansas 60
Scoring by half: 20–15, 27–33
Pts: S. Parker: 11; Rebs: S. Parker: 8 Asts: S. Parker: 2	Pts: M. Proffitt: 21; Rebs: K. Jordan: 13; Asts: B. Mullins: 3

Merrell Center
Katy, TX
Attendance: 1,073
Referees: Eric Koch, Chaney Muench, Darren McClure

== Awards and honors ==
Source: Tournament MVP: Maggie Proffitt, Central Arkansas

All-Tournament Team:

- Maggie Proffitt, Central Arkansas

- Stevi Parker, Stephen F. Austin
- Taylor Baudoin, Central Arkansas
- Taylor Ross, Stephen F. Austin
- Kassie Jones, Texas A&M-Corpus Christi

== See also ==
- 2017 Southland Conference men's basketball tournament
- Southland Conference women's basketball tournament
