= Southland Conference women's basketball tournament =

- Conference basketball championship
- Sport: College basketball
- Conference: Southland Conference
- Number of teams: 8
- Format: Single-elimination tournament
- Current stadium: Townsley Law Arena
- Current location: Lake Charles, Louisiana
- Played: 1983, 1988–present
- Last contest: 2025
- Current champion: Stephen F. Austin
- Most championships: Stephen F. Austin (17)
- TV partner: ESPN+ / ESPNU
- Official website: Southland.org Women's Basketball

Sponsors
- Jersey Mike's Subs

The Southland Conference's Women’s Basketball Tournament began in 1983, with the winner of the tournament receiving the conference's automatic bid into the NCAA Division I women's basketball tournament. There was no tournament from 1984-1987, but in 1988 the season-ending tradition returned for good, with a format much as in the men's tournament, with opening rounds at the home court of the higher seed, and a designated location thereafter.

Starting in 2007, both the men's and women's tournaments were played at the same neutral site, for all rounds.

The tournament was held at the Leonard E. Merrell Center in the Houston suburb of Katy, Texas from 2008 to 2022. Starting in 2023, the event moved to The Legacy Center on the campus of McNeese State University in Lake Charles, Louisiana, reportedly as part of a deal that kept McNeese in the Southland after it had been courted by Conference USA and nearly joined the Western Athletic Conference. An extension to 2029 for The Legacy Center to serve as the basketball tournament venue was announced on August 29, 2023.

== Tournament results ==
Year	Champion	Score	Runner-up	Tournament MVP	Location
1983	Northeast Louisiana (Note: Now known as Louisiana–Monroe.)	94–81	McNeese State	Eun Jung Lee, Northeast Louisiana	Monroe, Louisiana
1984	No Tournament Held.				
1985	No Tournament Held.				
1986	No Tournament Held.				
1987	No Tournament Held.				
1988	Stephen F. Austin	92–85	Northeast Louisiana	Mozell Brooks, Stephen F. Austin	Nacogdoches, Texas
1989	Stephen F. Austin	82–73	Northwestern State	Portia Hill, Stephen F. Austin	Nacogdoches, Texas
1990	Stephen F. Austin	93–83	Northwestern State	Pam Hudson, Northwestern State	Nacogdoches, Texas
1991	Stephen F. Austin	70–58	Northeast Louisiana	Stacey Jackson, Stephen F. Austin	Nacogdoches, Texas
1992	Stephen F. Austin	77–58	Northwestern State	Lori Davis, Stephen F. Austin	Nacogdoches, Texas
1993	Stephen F. Austin	77–75	Northwestern State	Deneen Parker, Stephen F. Austin	campus sites, final played in Nacogdoches, TX
1994	Stephen F. Austin	73–65	Northeast Louisiana	Trenia Tillis, Stephen F. Austin	Nacogdoches, TX
1995	Stephen F. Austin	68–60	Northwestern State	Latonia Bonnett, Stephen F. Austin	campus sites, final played in Shreveport, Louisiana
1996	Stephen F. Austin	76–58	Texas State	Latonia Bonnett, Stephen F. Austin	Shreveport, LA
1997	Texas State	77–65	Stephen F. Austin	Jerri Cooper, Texas State	Shreveport, LA
1998	Stephen F. Austin	84–52	Northeast Louisiana	Katrina Price, Stephen F. Austin	Shreveport, LA
1999	Stephen F. Austin	90–77	Northwestern State	Anitra Davis, Stephen F. Austin	Shreveport, LA
2000	Stephen F. Austin	79–68	Northwestern State	Shawnta Johnson, Stephen F. Austin	campus sites, final played in Shreveport, LA
2001	Stephen F. Austin	82–73	Northwestern State	Latisha Prater, Stephen F. Austin	campus sites, final played in Bossier City, Louisiana
2002	Stephen F. Austin	76–52	Northwestern State	Amy Collins, Stephen F. Austin	campus sites, final played in Nacogdoches, TX
2003	Texas State	68–56	Texas–San Antonio	Tori Talbert, Texas State	campus sites, final played in San Antonio, Texas
2004	Northwestern State	78–71	Texas–Arlington	Tori Talbert, Texas State	campus sites, final played in Natchitoches, Louisiana
2005	Texas–Arlington	69–54	Louisiana-Monroe	Terra Wallace, Texas-Arlington	campus sites, final played in Monroe, Louisiana
2006	Stephen F. Austin	56–48	Texas–San Antonio	LaToya Mills, Stephen F. Austin	campus sites, final played in Nacogdoches, Texas
2007	Texas-Arlington	68–47	Stephen F. Austin	Terra Wallace, Texas-Arlington	Campbell Center, Houston, TX
2008	Texas–San Antonio	65–56	Lamar	Monica Gibbs, Texas–San Antonio	Leonard E. Merrell Center, Katy, TX
2009	Texas–San Antonio	74–63	Texas–Arlington	Onika Anderson, Texas–San Antonio	Leonard E. Merrell Center, Katy, TX
2010	Lamar	86–59	Texas A&M–Corpus Christi	Darika Hill, Lamar	Leonard E. Merrell Center, Katy, TX
2011	McNeese State	71–50	Central Arkansas	Ashlyn Baggett, McNeese	Leonard E. Merrell Center, Katy, TX
2012	McNeese State	60–56	Stephen F. Austin	Caitlyn Baggett, McNeese	Leonard E. Merrell Center, Katy, TX
2013	Oral Roberts	72–66	Sam Houston State	Kevi Luper, Oral Roberts	Leonard E. Merrell Center, Katy, TX
2014	Northwestern State	62–44	Stephen F. Austin	Trudy Armstead, Northwestern State	Leonard E. Merrell Center, Katy, TX
2015	Northwestern State	58–50	Houston Baptist	Beatrice Attura, Northwestern State	Leonard E. Merrell Center, Katy, TX
2016	Central Arkansas	69–62	Sam Houston State	Angela Beadle, Sam Houston State	Leonard E. Merrell Center, Katy, TX
2017	Central Arkansas	60–30	Stephen F. Austin	Maggie Proffitt, Central Arkansas	Leonard E. Merrell Center, Katy, TX
2018	Nicholls State	69–65	Stephen F. Austin	Cassidy Barrios, Nicholls	Leonard E. Merrell Center, Katy, TX
2019	Abilene Christian	69–68	Texas A&M–Corpus Christi	Breanna Wright, Abilene Christian	Leonard E. Merrell Center, Katy, TX
2020	Canceled due to the COVID-19 pandemic.				
2021	Stephen F. Austin	56–45	Sam Houston	Aaliyah Johnson, Stephen F. Austin	Leonard E. Merrell Center, Katy, TX
2022	Incarnate Word	56–52^{OT}	Southeastern Louisiana	Tiana Gardner, Incarnate Word	Leonard E. Merrell Center, Katy, TX
2023	Southeastern Louisiana	66–57	Lamar	Hailey Giaratano, Southeastern Louisiana	The Legacy Center, Lake Charles, Louisiana
2024	Texas A&M–Corpus Christi	68–61	Lamar	Paige Allen, Texas A&M–Corpus Christi	The Legacy Center, Lake Charles, Louisiana
2025	Stephen F. Austin	65–57	Southeastern Louisiana	Trinity Moore, Stephen F. Austin	The Legacy Center, Lake Charles, Louisiana
2026	Stephen F. Austin	71-59	McNeese	Myka Perry, Stephen F. Austin	The Legacy Center, Lake Charles, Louisiana
2027					The Legacy Center, Lake Charles, Louisiana
2028					The Legacy Center, Lake Charles, Louisiana
2029					The Legacy Center, Lake Charles, Louisiana

== Performance by school ==
School	Championships	Championship Years
Stephen F. Austin	18	1988, 1989, 1990, 1991, 1992, 1993, 1994, 1995, 1996, 1998, 1999, 2000, 2001, 2002, 2006, 2021, 2025, 2026
Northwestern State	3	2004, 2014, 2015
Texas State	2	1997, 2003
UT Arlington	2	2005, 2007
UTSA	2	2008, 2009
McNeese	2	2011, 2012
Central Arkansas	2	2016, 2017
Louisiana–Monroe	1	1983
Lamar	1	2010
Oral Roberts	1	2013
Nicholls	1	2018
Abilene Christian	1	2019
Incarnate Word	1	2022
Southeastern Louisiana	1	2023
Texas A&M–Corpus Christi	1	2024
UTRGV	0	
East Texas A&M	0	
Houston Christian	0	
New Orleans	0	
TOTAL	37	

- In 2024-25, UTRGV first joined the Southland and Stephen F. Austin returned to the SLC after a three-season absence.
- Schools highlighted in pink are former members of the Southland

== See also ==
- Southland Conference men's basketball tournament
