= 2025–26 Nicholls Colonels women's basketball team =

Intercollegiate basketball season

2025–26 Nicholls Colonels women's basketball
- Conference: Southland Conference
- Record: 15–16 (10–12 Southland)
- Head coach: Justin Payne (3rd season)
- Assistant coaches: Nicholas Graham; Tykeria Williams; Jayln Johnson; Daelyn Craig
- Home arena: Stopher Gym

2025–26 Southland Conference women's basketball standings
	Conf.				Overall
Team	W		L	PCT	W		L	PCT
McNeese	21	–	1	.955	29	–	6	.829
Lamar	17	–	5	.773	20	–	11	.645
Stephen F. Austin †	16	–	6	.727	25	–	10	.714
UT Rio Grande Valley	16	–	6	.727	21	–	14	.600
Northwestern State	14	–	8	.636	18	–	14	.563
Incarnate Word	11	–	11	.500	13	–	17	.433
Nicholls	10	–	12	.455	15	–	16	.484
East Texas A&M	9	–	13	.409	13	–	17	.433
Houston Christian	6	–	16	.273	8	–	21	.276
Texas A&M–Corpus Christi	5	–	17	.227	6	–	23	.207
Southeastern Louisiana	4	–	18	.182	5	–	24	.172
New Orleans	3	–	19	.136	3	–	27	.100
† 2026 Southland tournament winner

The 2025–26 Nicholls Colonels women's basketball team represents Nicholls State University during the 2025–26 NCAA Division I women's basketball season. The Colonels, led by third-year head coach Justin Payne, play their home games at Stopher Gym located in Thibodaux, Louisiana as members of the Southland Conference.

== Media ==
Home games were broadcast on ESPN+.

== Roster ==
2025–26 Nicholls Colonels women's basketball team
Players
Coaches

Pos.	#	Name	Height	Year	Previous school	Hometown
G	0	Makayla Charles	5 ft 8 in (1.73 m)	Fr	Vandebilt Catholic High School	Houma, Louisiana
G	1	Jesslynn Jalomo	5 ft 6 in (1.68 m)	So	United High School	Laredo, Texas
G	2	Anyra Wilson	5 ft 7 in (1.7 m)	Fr	Wossman High School	Monroe, Louisiana
G	3	Tanita Swift	5 ft 5 in (1.65 m)	Sr	Pensacola State College	Birmingham, Alabama
G	7	Sanaiya Morris	5 ft 6 in (1.68 m)	Sr	Concord	McCalla, Alabama
F	10	Laryn Scott	6 ft 1 in (1.85 m)	So	Sparkman High School	Harvest, Alabama
G	11	Sh'Diamond McKnight	5 ft 6 in (1.68 m)	GS	Mississippi Valley State	Bossier City, Louisiana
G	12	Caroline Adams	5 ft 7 in (1.7 m)	So	E.D. White High School	Thibodaux, Louisiana
F	13	Jasmine Matthews	6 ft 0 in (1.83 m)	Jr	Louisiana	LaPlace, Louisiana
F	14	Marie Kenembeni	6 ft 2 in (1.88 m)	GS	Old Dominion	Yaoundé, Cameroon
	21	Makensie Charles	—	Fr	Vandebilt Catholic High School	Houma, Louisiana
G	22	Reese Hoadley	5 ft 8 in (1.73 m)	Fr	Georgetown High School	Georgetown, Texas
G	24	India McMahon	5 ft 11 in (1.8 m)	Jr	Angelina College	Sour Lake, Texas
F	30	Emani Burks	6 ft 2 in (1.88 m)	RS Sr	South Alabama	Rockledge, Florida

Head coach

- Justin Payne (Nicholls State)

Assistant coach(es)

- Nicholas Graham (Santa Fe College)
- Tykeria Williams (Nicholls State)
- Jayln Johnson (McNeese State)
- Daelyn Craig (Nicholls State)

Legend

- (C) Team captain
- (S) Suspended
- (I) Ineligible
- (W) Walk-on
- Injured
- Current redshirt

Roster
Last update: November 28, 2025

== Schedule ==
Date time, TV	Rank^{#}	Opponent^{#}	Result	Record	High points	High rebounds	High assists	Site (attendance) city, state
Non–conference regular season games
Nov 3, 2025*; 6:00 pm		at Alcorn State	W 72–66	1–0	18 – S. McKnight	10 – E. Burks	5 – A. Wilson	Davey Whitney Complex (576); Lorman, MS
Nov 8, 2025*; 8:00 pm, ESPN+		at UTEP	L 61–76	1–1	10 – S. McKnight	7 – L. Scott	3 – J. Jalomo	Don Haskins Center (1,040); El Paso, TX
Nov 12, 2025*; 11:00 am, ACCNX		at Florida State	L 64–89	1–2	11 – Tied	4 – Tied	2 – E. Burks	Donald L. Tucker Center (3,697); Tallahassee, FL
Nov 14, 2025*; 6:30 pm, ESPN+		Louisiana	W 66–64	2–2	23 – J. Jalomo	7 – Tied	4 – A. Wilson	Stopher Gymnasium (711); Thibodaux, LA
Nov 19, 2025*; 6:30 pm, ESPN+		Mississippi Valley State	W 73–66	3–2	15 – J. Matthews	10 – A. Wilson	4 – A. Wilson	Stopher Gymnasium (511); Thibodaux, LA
Nov 22, 2025*; 2:00 pm, ESPN+		at Southern Miss	L 60–86	3–3	19 – M. Kenembeni	6 – M. Kenembeni	5 – J. Jalomo	Reed Green Coliseum (3,121); Hattiesburg, MS
Dec 1, 2025*; 11:00 am		Louisiana Christian	W 101-54	4-3	23 – J. Matthews	14 – E. Burks	9 – A. Wilson	Stopher Gymnasium (3,800); Thibodaux, LA
Conference regular season games
Dec 16, 2025; 6:30 pm, ESPN+		Incarnate Word	L 52-54	4-4 (0-1)	14 – T. Swift	5 – Tied	2 – Tied	Stopher Gymnasium (511); Thibodaux, LA
Dec 18, 2025; 6:30 pm, ESPN+		Houston Christian	W 70-47	5-4 (1-1)	21 – M. Kenembeni	10 – M. Kenembeni	5 – T. Swift	Stopher Gymnasium (575); Thibodaux, LA
Dec 29, 2025; 5:00 pm, ESPN+		at Texas A&M–Corpus Christi	W 63-57	6-4 (2-1)	31 – J. Matthews	10 – E. Burks	4 – J. Jalomo	American Bank Center (1,068); Corpus Christi, TX
Dec 31, 2025; 2:00 pm, ESPN+		at UT Rio Grande Valley	W 66-56	7-4 (3-1)	14 – S. McKnight	11 – A. Wilson	8 – A. Wilson	UTRGV Fieldhouse (425); Edinburg, TX
Jan 3, 2026; 1:00 pm, ESPN+		Northwestern State	L 46-50	7-5 (3-2)	12 – Tied	7 – Tied	2 – T. Swift	Stopher Gymnasium (555); Thibodaux, LA
Jan 8, 2026; 6:30 pm, ESPN+		at McNeese	L 51-62	7-6 (3-3)	13 – J. Jalomo	9 – E. Burks	4 – S. McKnight	The Legacy Center (2,442); Lake Charles, LA
Jan 10, 2026; 2:00 pm, ESPN+		at New Orleans	W 79-64	8-6 (4-3)	15 – A. Wilson	10 – E. Burks	8 – A. Wilson	Lakefront Arena (182); New Orleans, LA
Jan 15, 2026; 6:30 pm, ESPN+		Stephen F. Austin	L 78-86	8-7 (4-4)	17 – E. Burks	9 – L. Scott	3 – Tied	Stopher Gymnasium (411); Thibodaux, LA
Jan 17, 2026; 1:00 pm, ESPN+		Lamar	L 64-72	8-8 (4-5)	20 – T. Swift	5 – T. Swift	2 – S. McKnight	Stopher Gymnasium (444); Thibodaux, LA
Jan 22, 2026; 6:30 pm, ESPN+		New Orleans	W 67-49	9-8 (5-5)	20 – M. Kenembeni	10 – E. Burks	5 – S. McKnight	Stopher Gymnasium (767); Thibodaux, LA
Jan 24, 2026; 11:00 am, ESPN+		at Southeastern Louisiana	W 69-66	10-8 (6-5)	21 – M. Kenembeni	9 – M. Kenembeni	2 – Tied	Pride Roofing University Center (253); Hammond, LA
Jan 29, 2026; 6:30 pm, ESPN+		at Northwestern State	L 47-57	10-9 (6-6)	17 – M. Kenembeni	9 – M. Kenembeni	2 – A. Wilson	Prather Coliseum (444); Natchitoches, LA
Jan 31, 2026; 2:30 pm, ESPN+		at East Texas A&M	L 57-68	10-10 (6-7)	19 – M. Kenembeni	8 – M. Kenembeni	4 – T. Swift	The Field House (327); Commerce, TX
Feb 5, 2026; 6:30 pm, ESPN+		UT Rio Grande Valley	L 66-69	10-11 (6-8)	17 – S. McKnight	7 – T. Swift	3 – T. Swift	Stopher Gymnasium (433); Thibodaux, LA
Feb 7, 2026; 1:00 pm, ESPN+		Texas A&M–Corpus Christi	W 69-42	11-11 (7-8)	22 – S. McKnight	7 – A. Wilson	3 – A. Wilson	Stopher Gymnasium (311); Thibodaux, LA
Feb 12, 2026; 6:00 pm, ESPN+		at Houston Christian	W 59-43	12-11 (8-8)	15 – S. McKnight	8 – E. Burks	4 – J. Jalomo	Sharp Gymnasium (478); Houston, TX
Feb 14, 2026; 1:00 pm, ESPN+		at Incarnate Word	L 66-72	12-12 (8-9)	18 – M. Kenembeni	9 – T. Swift	7 – T. Swift	McDermott Center (174); San Antonio, TX
Feb 19, 2026; 6:30 pm, ESPN+		at Lamar	L 52-62	12-13 (8-10)	14 – Tied	11 – T. Swift	3 – Tied	Montagne Center (897); Beaumont, TX
Feb 21, 2026; 2:00 pm, ESPN+		at Stephen F. Austin	L 57-77	12-14 (8-11)	11 – Tied	5 – E. Burks	4 – A. Wilson	William R. Johnson Coliseum (922); Nacogdoches, TX
Feb 26, 2026; 6:30 pm, ESPN+		McNeese	L 59-69	12-15 (8-12)	19 – S. McKnight	6 – E. Burks	5 – A. Wilson	Stopher Gymnasium (422); Thibodaux, LA
Feb 28, 2026; 1:00 pm, ESPN+		Southeastern Louisiana	W 57-55	13-15 (9-12)	16 – S. McKnight	9 – E. Burks	2 – Tied	Stopher Gymnasium (514); Thibodaux, LA
Mar 3, 2026; 11:00 am, ESPN+		East Texas A&M	W 69-49	14-15 (10-12)	15 – Tied	5 – Tied	3 – Tied	Stopher Gymnasium (112); Thibodaux, LA
2026 Jersey Mike's Subs Southland Conference Tournament
Mar 9, 2026; 1:30 pm, ESPN+	(7)	vs. (6) Incarnate Word	W 81-55	15-15	29 – S. McKnight	5 – Tied	3 – Tied	The Legacy Center; Lake Charles, LA
Mar 10, 2026; 1:30 pm, ESPN+	(7)	vs. (3) Stephen F. Austin	L 60-63	15-16	21 – S. McKnight	11 – E. Burks	3 – Tied	The Legacy Center; Lake Charles, LA
*Non-conference game. ^{#}Rankings from AP poll. (#) Tournament seedings in parentheses. All times are in Central.

== Conference awards and honors ==
=== Weekly awards ===
Weekly honors
Honors	Player	Position	Date Awarded	Ref.

== See also ==
- 2025–26 Nicholls Colonels men's basketball team
