= 2021 Southland Conference women's basketball tournament =

- Classification: Division I
- Season: 2020–21
- Teams: 10
- Site: Merrell Center; Katy, Texas
- Champions: Stephen F. Austin (16th title)
- Winning coach: Mark Kellogg (1st title)
- MVP: Aaliyah Johnson (Stephen F. Austin)
- Attendance: 539 (championship)
- Television: ESPN+/CBSSN

2020–21 Southland Conference women's basketball standings
	Conf.				Overall
Team	W		L	PCT	W		L	PCT
Stephen F. Austin †	14	–	0	1.000	24	–	3	.889
Southeastern Louisiana	10	–	5	.667	11	–	8	.579
Sam Houston State	9	–	5	.643	15	–	8	.652
Lamar	9	–	6	.600	10	–	14	.417
Central Arkansas	9	–	7	.563	13	–	14	.481
Nicholls	9	–	7	.563	11	–	14	.440
Abilene Christian	6	–	7	.462	14	–	10	.583
Houston Baptist	6	–	7	.462	11	–	11	.500
Incarnate Word	4	–	5	.444	6	–	8	.429
McNeese State	6	–	8	.429	6	–	16	.273
Texas A&M–CC	4	–	7	.364	6	–	13	.316
New Orleans	3	–	12	.200	6	–	15	.286
Northwestern State	1	–	14	.067	1	–	19	.050
† SLC tournament winner As of April 4, 2021; Rankings from AP poll

The 2021 Southland Conference women's basketball tournament, a part of the 2020–21 NCAA Division I women's basketball season, took place March 9–14, 2021, at the Merrell Center in Katy, Texas. Stephen F. Austin won the tournament, claiming its 16th and final Southland Conference title, and received the Southland's automatic bid to the 2021 NCAA tournament. SFA is one of five schools that will leave the Southland on July 1, 2021, with SFA being one of four joining the Western Athletic Conference.

== Seeds ==
Only the top ten teams advanced to the Southland Conference tournament.

Seed	School	Conference	Overall
1	‡* Stephen F. Austin	14–0	22–2
2	* Southeastern Louisiana	10–5	11–7
3	# Sam Houston	9–5	13–7
4	# Lamar	9–6	10–13
5	Central Arkansas	9–7	12–13
6	Nicholls	9–7	10–13
7	Abilene Christian	6–7	14–9
8	Houston Baptist	6–7	11–11
9	McNeese State	6–8	6–16
10	Incarnate Word	4–5	6–8
‡ – Southland Conference regular season champions. * – Receive a first-round and second-round bye in the conference tournament. # – Receive a first-round bye in the conference tournament. Overall record are as of the end of the regular season.

== Schedule ==
Session	Game	Time*	Matchup^{#}	Score	Television
First round – Wednesday, March 10
1	1	11:00 am	No. 9 McNeese vs. No. 8 Houston Baptist	68–80	ESPN+
1	2	2:00 pm	No. 10 Incarnate Word vs. No. 7 Abilene Christian	70–81	ESPN+
Second Round – Thursday, March 11
2	3	11:00 am	No. 8 Houston Baptist vs. No. 5 Central Arkansas	46–51	ESPN+
2	4	2:00 pm	No. 7 Abilene Christian vs. No. 6 Nicholls	57–67	ESPN+
Quarterfinals – Friday, March 12
3	5	11:00 am	No. 5 Central Arkansas vs. No. 4 Lamar	69–55	ESPN+
3	6	2:00 pm	No. 6 Nicholls vs. No. 3 Sam Houston	59–89	ESPN+
Semifinals – Saturday, March 13
4	7	1:00 pm	No. 5 Central Arkansas vs. No. 1 Stephen F. Austin	47–55	ESPN+
4	8	4:00 pm	No. 3 Sam Houston vs. No. 2 Southeastern Louisiana	79–77	ESPN+
Championship – Sunday, March 14
5	9	1:00 pm	No. 1 Stephen F. Austin vs. No. 3 Sam Houston	56–45	CBSSN
Game times in CST. Rankings denote tournament seeding.

== Bracket ==
First round Wednesday, March 10; ESPN+
8	Houston Baptist	74
9	McNeese	60
7	Abilene Christian	81
10	Incarnate Word	70

Second round Thursday, March 11; ESPN+
5	Central Arkansas	56
8	Houston Baptist	51
6	Nicholls	67
7	Abilene Christian	57

Quarterfinals; Friday, March 12; ESPN+
4	Lamar	55
5	Central Arkansas	69
3	Sam Houston	89
6	Nicholls	59

Semifinals; Saturday, March 13; ESPN+
1	Stephen F. Austin	55
5	Central Arkansas	47
2	Southeastern Louisiana	77
3	Sam Houston	79

Championship; Sunday, March 14; CBSSN
1	Stephen F. Austin	56
3	Sam Houston	45

== See also ==
- 2021 Southland Conference men's basketball tournament
