= 2025–26 Southeastern Louisiana Lady Lions basketball team =

Intercollegiate basketball season

2025–26 Southeastern Louisiana Lady Lions basketball
- Conference: Southland Conference
- Record: 5–24 (4–18 Southland)
- Head coach: Jeff Dow (1st season)
- Associate head coach: Ross Rix
- Assistant coaches: Keanna Keys; Regan Bolton
- Home arena: Pride Roofing University Center

2025–26 Southland Conference women's basketball standings
	Conf.				Overall
Team	W		L	PCT	W		L	PCT
McNeese	21	–	1	.955	29	–	6	.829
Lamar	17	–	5	.773	20	–	11	.645
Stephen F. Austin †	16	–	6	.727	25	–	10	.714
UT Rio Grande Valley	16	–	6	.727	21	–	14	.600
Northwestern State	14	–	8	.636	18	–	14	.563
Incarnate Word	11	–	11	.500	13	–	17	.433
Nicholls	10	–	12	.455	15	–	16	.484
East Texas A&M	9	–	13	.409	13	–	17	.433
Houston Christian	6	–	16	.273	8	–	21	.276
Texas A&M–Corpus Christi	5	–	17	.227	6	–	23	.207
Southeastern Louisiana	4	–	18	.182	5	–	24	.172
New Orleans	3	–	19	.136	3	–	27	.100
† 2026 Southland tournament winner

The 2025–26 Southeastern Louisiana Lady Lions basketball team represented Southeastern Louisiana University in the 2025–26 NCAA Division I women's basketball season. The Lady Lions were led by first-year head coach Jeff Dow, and played their home games at Pride Roofing University Center in Hammond, Louisiana as members of the Southland Conference.

The Lady Lions finished the season 5–24 overall, 4–18 in Southland play, to finish in eleventh place.

== Previous season ==
The Lady Lions finished the 2024–25 season 26–6 overall, 19–1 in Southland play, to finish in first place. With a first-round and quarterfinals bye, they defeated Incarnate Word in the semifinals of the Southland tournament and were defeated by Stephen F. Austin in the championship, but received a bid to play in the WBIT. The Lady Lions' season ended when they were defeated by Colorado in the first round.

On March 22, head coach Ayla Guzzardo announced that she would leave the program, as she had been hired as head coach for conference opponent McNeese.

On March 25, Southeastern Louisiana hired Incarnate Word head coach Jeff Dow as their new coach.

== Media ==
Home games were broadcast on ESPN+.

== Roster ==
2025–26 Southeastern Louisiana Lions women's basketball team
Players
Coaches

Pos.	#	Name	Height	Year	Previous school	Hometown
G	1	Natalie Huff	5 ft 7 in (1.7 m)	RS Fr	Tom C. Clark HS; Texas A&M–Corpus Christi	San Antonio, TX
G	2	Taylor Wilkins	5 ft 10 in (1.78 m)	RS Sr	Mount Carmel Academy; McNeese; UNC Asheville	New Orleans, LA
G	3	Eryn McKinzie	5 ft 10 in (1.78 m)	So	Brewer HS; Incarnate Word	Fort Worth, TX
G	4	Mia Ramos	5 ft 7 in (1.7 m)	Fr	Brandeis HS	San Antonio, TX
G	5	Emma Lucio	5 ft 9 in (1.75 m)	Jr	Robert Vela HS; UTSA	Edinburg, TX
F	6	Aisha Marten-Coney	6 ft 0 in (1.83 m)	Jr	St Vincent's College; Ranger College	Sydney, Australia
G	7	Aliyah Collins	5 ft 7 in (1.7 m)	RS Jr	College Station HS; Incarnate Word; Mercer	College Station, TX
G	8	Fatime Seck	6 ft 0 in (1.83 m)	Jr	Franklin HS; Central Arkansas; New Mexico JC	El Paso, TX
G	10	Lihi Azouri	5 ft 8 in (1.73 m)	Fr	A.S. Ramat Hasharon	Herzliya, Israel
G	12	Erynn Williams	5 ft 8 in (1.73 m)	RS Sr	Arthur Hill HS; Delta College; LSU–Shreveport	Saginaw, MI
F	13	Bethany Graves	5 ft 11 in (1.8 m)	Jr	Pascagoula HS; Southwest Mississippi CC	Pascagoula, MS
F	22	Taylor Ross	6 ft 1 in (1.85 m)	Jr	Silver Lake HS; Ellsworth CC	Silver Lake, KS
G	23	Mari Dangerfield	6 ft 0 in (1.83 m)	Fr	Legion Preparatory Academy	Dallas, TX
G	24	Mackenzie Thomas	5 ft 8 in (1.73 m)	RS Sr	Laurel HS; Jones College	Laurel, MS

Head coach

- Jeff Dow (Oregon)

Assistant coach(es)

- Ross Rix (Louisiana)
- Keanna Keys (Little Rock)
- Regan Bolton (McNeese State)

Legend

- (C) Team captain
- (S) Suspended
- (I) Ineligible
- (W) Walk-on
- Injured
- Current redshirt

Roster
Last update: September 10, 2025

== Schedule and results ==
Date time, TV	Rank^{#}	Opponent^{#}	Result	Record	High points	High rebounds	High assists	Site (attendance) city, state
Exhibition
October 28, 2025*; 6:00 p.m.		Millsaps	W 69–54	–	–	–	–	Pride Roofing University Center (100); Hammond, LA
Regular season
November 3, 2025*; 11:00 a.m., ESPN+		Centenary	W 105–49	1–0	16 – Ross	9 – Williams	7 – Huff	Pride Roofing University Center (2,047); Hammond, LA
November 6, 2025*; 7:00 p.m., SECN		at No. 5 LSU	L 26–115	1–1	8 – Dangerfield	4 – 2 tied	2 – 2 tied	Pete Maravich Assembly Center (9,540); Baton Rouge, LA
November 13, 2025*; 6:30 p.m., SECN+		at Arkansas	L 60–68	1–2	14 – Dangerfield	8 – Ross	3 – Collins	Bud Walton Arena (1,977); Fayetteville, AR
November 18, 2025*; 5:00 p.m., ESPN+		at Southern Miss	L 53–86	1–3	16 – Huff	6 – Huff	2 – 2 tied	Reed Green Coliseum; Hattiesburg, MS
November 22, 2025; 1:00 p.m., ESPN+		East Texas A&M	W 76–71	2–3 (1–0)	29 – Azouri	9 – 2 tied	4 – Collins	Pride Roofing University Center (278); Hammond, LA
December 3, 2025*; 7:00 p.m., ESPN+		at No. 14 Baylor	L 47–112	2–4	15 – Collins	4 – Huff	3 – Collins	Foster Pavilion (3,158); Waco, TX
December 7, 2025; 1:00 p.m., ESPN+		Northwestern State	L 52–69	2–5 (1–1)	23 – Collins	7 – Williams	3 – McKinzie	Pride Roofing University Center (286); Hammond, LA
December 12, 2025; 6:00 p.m., ESPN+		at Houston Christian	L 70–77 ^{2OT}	2–6 (1–2)	29 – Collins	11 – Collins	2 – 2 tied	Sharp Gymnasium (567); Houston, TX
December 20, 2025*; 1:00 p.m., ESPN+		Memphis	L 66–70	2–7	22 – Azouri	7 – Azouri	4 – Huff	Pride Roofing University Center (321); Hammond, LA
December 28, 2025*; 1:00 p.m., SECN+		at No. 2 Texas	L 38–120	2–8	13 – McKinzie	3 – 3 tied	2 – Marten-Coney	Moody Center (9,378); Austin, TX
December 31, 2025; 1:00 p.m., ESPN+		at Incarnate Word	L 59–66	2–9 (1–3)	21 – Collins	9 – Graves	5 – McKinzie	McDermott Center (101); San Antonio, TX
January 3, 2026; 1:00 p.m., ESPN+		Stephen F. Austin	L 72–87	2–10 (1–4)	21 – Collins	8 – McKinzie	5 – Collins	Pride Roofing University Center (221); Hammond, LA
January 8, 2026; 6:00 p.m., ESPN+		New Orleans	L 63–64	2–11 (1–5)	19 – Azouri	11 – Graves	6 – Collins	Pride Roofing University Center (302); Hammond, LA
January 10, 2026; 1:00 p.m., ESPN+		at McNeese	L 55–77	2–12 (1–6)	16 – 2 tied	7 – Huff	3 – Azouri	The Legacy Center (2,885); Lake Charles, LA
January 15, 2026; 6:30 p.m., ESPN+		at UT Rio Grande Valley	L 65–78	2–13 (1–7)	17 – Ramos	4 – Ramos	4 – Huff	UTRGV Fieldhouse (503); Edinburg, TX
January 17, 2026; 1:00 p.m., ESPN+		at Texas A&M–Corpus Christi	L 65–68	2–14 (1–8)	22 – McKinzie	9 – Graves	5 – Collins	American Bank Center (1,558); Corpus Christi, TX
January 22, 2026; 6:00 p.m., ESPN+		McNeese	L 30–72	2–15 (1–9)	7 – 2 tied	12 – Seck	4 – Collins	Pride Roofing University Center (788); Hammond, LA
January 24, 2026; 1:00 p.m., ESPN+		Nicholls	L 66–69	2–16 (1–10)	16 – Collins	6 – Ross	4 – 2 tied	Pride Roofing University Center (253); Hammond, LA
January 29, 2026; 6:00 p.m., ESPN+		Lamar	L 44–57	2–17 (1–11)	15 – Azouri	7 – Seck	4 – Collins	Pride Roofing University Center (215); Hammond, LA
January 31, 2026; 2:00 p.m., ESPN+		at Stephen F. Austin	L 55–83	2–18 (1–12)	14 – Collins	6 – Graves	4 – 3 tied	William R. Johnson Coliseum (1,294); Nacogdoches, TX
February 5, 2026; 6:00 p.m., ESPN+		Incarnate Word	W 74–64	3–18 (2–12)	15 – Wilkins	11 – Graves	4 – Collins	Pride Roofing University Center (377); Hammond, LA
February 7, 2026; 1:00 p.m., ESPN+		Houston Christian	W 68–61	4–18 (3–12)	17 – Ramos	10 – Collins	8 – Huff	Pride Roofing University Center (377); Hammond, LA
February 12, 2026; 6:30 p.m., ESPN+		at East Texas A&M	L 57–66	4–19 (3–13)	21 – Collins	6 – Collins	7 – Collins	The Field House (468); Commerce, TX
February 14, 2026; 1:00 p.m., ESPN+		at Northwestern State	L 47–62	4–20 (3–14)	14 – Collins	5 – Seck	4 – Collins	Prather Coliseum (325); Natchitoches, LA
February 19, 2026; 6:00 p.m., ESPN+		Texas A&M–Corpus Christi	L 69–76	4–21 (3–15)	30 – Collins	6 – Huff	4 – Huff	Pride Roofing University Center (478); Hammond, LA
February 21, 2026; 1:00 p.m., ESPN+		UT Rio Grande Valley	L 54–77	4–22 (3–16)	14 – Ramos	7 – Seck	5 – Ramos	Pride Roofing University Center (311); Hammond, LA
February 26, 2026; 6:30 p.m., ESPN+		at New Orleans	W 74–64	5–22 (4–16)	19 – Azouri	7 – 2 tied	4 – 2 tied	Lakefront Arena (246); New Orleans, LA
February 28, 2026; 1:00 p.m., ESPN+		at Nicholls	L 55–57	5–23 (4–17)	17 – Collins	5 – 2 tied	4 – Collins	Stopher Gymnasium (514); Thibodaux, LA
March 2, 2026; 6:30 p.m., ESPN+		at Lamar	L 52–70	5–24 (4–18)	27 – Collins	6 – Ramos	3 – Collins	Montagne Center (1,139); Beaumont, TX
*Non-conference game. ^{#}Rankings from AP poll. (#) Tournament seedings in parentheses. All times are in Central Time Zone.

== Conference awards and honors ==
=== Weekly awards ===
Weekly honors
Honors	Player	Position	Date awarded	Ref.
SLC Women's Basketball Player of the Week	Lihi Azouri	G/F	November 24, 2025	

== See also ==
- 2025–26 Southeastern Louisiana Lions basketball team
