= 2025–26 Stephen F. Austin Ladyjacks basketball team =

2025–26 Stephen F. Austin Ladyjacks basketball

Southland tournament champions

NCAA tournament, First Four
- Conference: Southland Conference
- Record: 25–10 (16–6 SLC)
- Head coach: Leonard Bishop (3rd season)
- Associate head coach: Steve Yang
- Assistant coaches: Dr. Jeanne-Marie Wilson; Lexi Murphy
- Home arena: William R. Johnson Coliseum

2025–26 Southland Conference women's basketball standings
	Conf.				Overall
Team	W		L	PCT	W		L	PCT
McNeese	21	–	1	.955	29	–	6	.829
Lamar	17	–	5	.773	20	–	11	.645
Stephen F. Austin †	16	–	6	.727	25	–	10	.714
UT Rio Grande Valley	16	–	6	.727	21	–	14	.600
Northwestern State	14	–	8	.636	18	–	14	.563
Incarnate Word	11	–	11	.500	13	–	17	.433
Nicholls	10	–	12	.455	15	–	16	.484
East Texas A&M	9	–	13	.409	13	–	17	.433
Houston Christian	6	–	16	.273	8	–	21	.276
Texas A&M–Corpus Christi	5	–	17	.227	6	–	23	.207
Southeastern Louisiana	4	–	18	.182	5	–	24	.172
New Orleans	3	–	19	.136	3	–	27	.100
† 2026 Southland tournament winner

The 2025–26 Stephen F. Austin Ladyjacks basketball team represented Stephen F. Austin State University during the 2025–26 NCAA Division I women's basketball season. The Ladyjacks, who were led by third-year head coach Leonard Bishop, played their home games at the William R. Johnson Coliseum in Nacogdoches, Texas, as members of the Southland Conference (SLC).

== Previous season ==
The Ladyjacks finished the 2024–25 season 29–6, 16–4 in Southland play to finish in third place. They defeated Nicholls, Lamar and Southeastern Louisiana to win the Southland tournament. They recivied an at-large bid to the NCAA tournament where they lost in the first round to Notre Dame.

== Preseason polls ==
=== Southland Conference Poll ===
The Southland Conference released its preseason poll on October 17, 2025. Receiving 208 overall votes, the Ladyjacks were picked to finish second in the conference.

Predicted finish	Team	Votes (1st place)
1	McNeese	242 (21)
2	Stephen F. Austin	208
3	Nicholls	205 (3)
4	Texas A&M–Corpus Christi	191
5	Lamar	143
6	Southeastern Louisiana	121
7	Incarnate Word	117
8	UT Rio Grande Valley	112
9	Northwestern State	92
T-10	Texas A&M–Commerce	59
T-10	New Orleans	59
12	Houston Christian	48

=== Preseason All-Conference ===
Harmanie Dominguez was selected to the Preseason All-Conference team.

== Roster ==
2025–26 Stephen F. Austin Ladyjacks women's basketball team
Players
Coaches

Pos.	#	Name	Height	Year	Previous school	Hometown
G	0	Hope LeMelle	5 ft 7 in (1.7 m)	GS	Liberty	Dallas, Texas
G	1	Myka Perry	6 ft 1 in (1.85 m)	So	Florida	Norman, Oklahoma
G	2	Aziyah Farrier	6 ft 1 in (1.85 m)	Fr	Liberty High School	Frisco, Texas
G	3	Avery VanSickle	5 ft 10 in (1.78 m)	Sr	Regis Jesuit High School	Denver, Colorado
G	4	Ashlyn Traylor-Walker	5 ft 8 in (1.73 m)	Sr	Radford	Franklin, Indiana
G	5	Key Roseby	6 ft 0 in (1.83 m)	So	Frisco Liberty High School	Frisco, Texas
G	7	Lydia Cajuste	5 ft 6 in (1.68 m)	RS So	John Paul II High School	Dallas, Texas
G	9	Anika Hyland	5 ft 6 in (1.68 m)	Fr	Tauranga Girls' College	Tauranga, New Zealand
G	10	Harmanie Dominguez	5 ft 6 in (1.68 m)	Sr	Adams State	Las Cruces, New Mexico
G	12	Kaylinn Kemp	5 ft 9 in (1.75 m)	Fr	Duncanville High School	Duncanville, Texas
F	20	Cha Gardner	6 ft 3 in (1.91 m)	So	Newark Valley High School	Newark Valley, New York
C	24	Talia Vann	6 ft 3 in (1.91 m)	Fr	Bethany High School	Oklahoma City, Oklahoma

Head coach

- Leonard Bishop (East Texas A&M)

Assistant coach(es)

- Steve Yang (Missouri State)
- Dr. Jeanne-Marie Wilson (St. Augustine's)
- Lexi Murphy (Angelo State)

Legend

- (C) Team captain
- (S) Suspended
- (I) Ineligible
- (W) Walk-on
- Injured
- Current redshirt

Roster
Last update: March 24, 2026

== Schedule and results ==
Date time, TV	Rank^{#}	Opponent^{#}	Result	Record	High points	High rebounds	High assists	Site (attendance) city, state
Regular season
November 3, 2025*; 11:00 a.m., ESPN+		Nelson	W 85–54	1–0	21 – Perry	10 – Roseby	6 – Hyland	William R. Johnson Coliseum (847); Nacogdoches, TX
November 8, 2025*; 2:00 p.m., ESPN+		Texas A&M–Texarkana	W 76–37	2–0	16 – Dominguez	10 – Roseby	6 – Tied	William R. Johnson Coliseum (682); Nacogdoches, TX
November 14, 2025*; 2:00 p.m., ESPN+		Abilene Christian	W 77–76	3–0	19 – Roseby	9 – Perry	6 – Kemp	William R. Johnson Coliseum (1,212); Nacogdoches, TX
November 17, 2025*; 6:00 p.m., ESPN+		Houston	W 82–78	4–0	20 – Perry	10 – Dominguez	5 – Tied	William R. Johnson Coliseum (1,182); Nacogdoches, TX
November 23, 2025*; 2:00 p.m., ESPN+		at Louisiana Tech	L 66–93	4–1	13 – Roseby	5 – Farrier	3 – Tied	Thomas Assembly Center; Ruston, LA
November 27, 2025*; 11:00 a.m., FloHoops		vs. Hampton; Puerto Rico Shootout	W 67–61	5–1	16 – Roseby	11 – Farrier	5 – Perry	Roberto Clemente Coliseum (200); San Juan, PR
November 29, 2025*; 10:30 a.m., FloHoops		vs. Longwood; Puerto Rico Shootout	L 60–67	5–2	20 – Dominguez	13 – Gardner	7 – Kemp	Roberto Clemente Coliseum (100); San Juan, PR
December 6, 2025*; 8:00 p.m., ESPN+		Texas State	W 74–66	6–2	21 – Dominguez	10 – Dominguez	7 – Kemp	William R. Johnson Coliseum (894); Nacogdoches, TX
December 15, 2025; 6:00 p.m., ESPN+		UTRGV	L 85–87	6–3 (0–1)	26 – Roseby	6 – Roseby	6 – Kemp	William R. Johnson Coliseum (384); Nacogdoches, TX
December 17, 2025; 5:30 p.m., ESPN+		Texas A&M–Corpus Christi	W 84–62	7–3 (1–1)	19 – Kemp	14 – Farrier	5 – Kemp	William R. Johnson Coliseum (829); Nacogdoches, TX
December 20, 2025*; 1:00 p.m., SECN+/ESPN+		at Arkansas	L 73–82	7–4	19 – Dominguez	8 – Gardner	5 – Kemp	Bud Walton Arena (2,253); Fayetteville, AR
December 29, 2025; 4:00 p.m., ESPN+		at East Texas A&M	L 68–71	7–5 (1–2)	22 – Kemp	8 – Dominguez	8 – Kemp	The Field House (363); Commerce, TX
December 31, 2025; 1:00 p.m., ESPN+		at Northwestern State	W 76–71	8–5 (2–2)	24 – Kemp	8 – Farrier	6 – Kemp	Prather Coliseum (221); Natchitoches, LA
January 3, 2026; 1:00 p.m., ESPN+		at Southeastern Louisiana	W 87–72	9–5 (3–2)	24 – Dominguez	10 – Tied	5 – Tied	Pride Roofing University Center (221); Hammond, LA
January 8, 2026; 6:00 p.m., ESPN+		Incarnate Word	W 75–63	10–5 (4–2)	17 – Perry	9 – Farrier	5 – Kemp	William R. Johnson Coliseum (758); Nacogdoches, TX
January 10, 2026; 2:00 p.m., ESPN+		Houston Christian	W 87–67	11–5 (5–2)	24 – Dominguez	10 – Roseby	8 – Kemp	William R. Johnson Coliseum (1,019); Nacogdoches, TX
January 15, 2026; 6:30 p.m., ESPN+		at Nicholls	W 86–78	12–5 (6–2)	20 – Perry	12 – Roseby	11 – Kemp	Stopher Gymnasium (411); Thibodaux, LA
January 17, 2026; 2:00 p.m., ESPN+		at New Orleans	W 85–63	13–5 (7–2)	21 – Roseby	9 – Roseby	6 – Kemp	Lakefront Arena (171); New Orleans, LA
January 22, 2026; 6:30 p.m., ESPN+		Northwestern State	W 70–63	14–5 (8–2)	21 – Kemp	10 – Gardner	9 – Kemp	William R. Johnson Coliseum (987); Nacogdoches, TX
January 24, 2026; 2:00 p.m., ESPN+		at Lamar	L 63–73	14–6 (8–3)	16 – Roseby	7 – Farrier	5 – Kemp	Neches Arena (952); Beaumont, TX
January 29, 2026; 6:30 p.m., ESPN+		McNeese	L 64–70 ^{OT}	14–7 (8–4)	19 – Dominguez	9 – Roseby	4 – Traylor-Walker	William R. Johnson Coliseum (1,843); Nacogdoches, TX
January 31, 2026; 2:00 p.m., ESPN+		Southeastern Louisiana	W 83–55	15–7 (9–4)	19 – Roseby	13 – Farrier	6 – Kemp	William R. Johnson Coliseum (1,294); Nacogdoches, TX
February 5, 2026; 6:30 p.m., ESPN+		East Texas A&M	L 64–65	15–8 (9–5)	23 – Traylor-Walker	11 – Traylor-Walker	4 – Kemp	William R. Johnson Coliseum (821); Nacogdoches, TX
February 7, 2026; 2:00 p.m., ESPN+		Lamar	W 58–57	16–8 (10–5)	17 – Kemp	9 – Roseby	4 – Perry	William R. Johnson Coliseum (991); Nacogdoches, TX
February 12, 2026; 7:00 p.m., ESPN+		at Texas A&M–Corpus Christi	W 93–51	17–8 (11–5)	23 – Perry	7 – Gardner	6 – Roseby	American Bank Center (811); Corpus Christi, TX
February 14, 2026; 2:00 p.m., ESPN+		at UTRGV	W 72–70	18–8 (12–5)	17 – Roseby	6 – Farrier	7 – Kemp	UTRGV Fieldhouse (754); Edinburg, TX
February 19, 2026; 6:30 p.m., ESPN+		New Orleans	W 101–64	19–8 (13–5)	23 – Tied	10 – Gardner	7 – Traylor-Walker	William R. Johnson Coliseum (892); Nacogdoches, TX
February 21, 2026; 2:00 p.m., ESPN+		Nicholls	W 77–57	20–8 (14–5)	18 – Dominguez	10 – Farrier	5 – Traylor-Walker	William R. Johnson Coliseum (922); Nacogdoches, TX
February 26, 2026; 6:00 p.m., ESPN+		at Incarnate Word	W 93–71	21–8 (15–5)	32 – Traylor-Walker	7 – Tied	4 – Roseby	McDermott Center (150); San Antonio, TX
February 28, 2026; 1:00 p.m., ESPN+		at Houston Baptist	W 71–47	22–8 (16–5)	21 – Roseby	7 – Traylor-Walker	6 – Dominguez	Sharp Gymnasium (445); Houston, TX
March 2, 2026; 6:30 p.m., ESPN+		at McNeese	L 60–87	22–9 (16–6)	12 – Tied	7 – Roseby	3 – Perry	Townsley Law Arena (2,499); Lake Charles, LA
Southland Conference Tournament
March 10, 2026; 1:30 p.m., ESPN+	(3)	vs. (7) Nicholls; Quarterfinals	W 63–60	23–9	18 – Perry	10 – Tied	6 – Kemp	Townsley Law Arena; Lake Charles, LA
March 11, 2026; 1:00 p.m., ESPN+	(3)	vs. (2) Lamar; Semifinals	W 64–59 ^{OT}	24–9	17 – Kemp	7 – Tied	3 – Kemp	Townsley Law Arena (3,244); Lake Charles, LA
March 12, 2026; 4:00 p.m., ESPNU	(3)	vs. (1) McNeese; Championship	W 71–59	25–9	21 – Perry	10 – Farrier	4 – Kemp	Townsley Law Arena; Lake Charles, LA
NCAA Tournament
March 20, 2025*; 8:00 p.m., ESPN2	(11 FW3)	vs. (11 FW3) Missouri State; First Four	L 75–85	25–10	23 – Traylor-Walker	9 – Farrier	4 – Traylor-Walker	Moody Center (681); Austin, TX
*Non-conference game. ^{#}Rankings from AP poll. (#) Tournament seedings in parentheses. FW3=Fort Worth 3. All times are in Central.

== See also ==
- 2025–26 Stephen F. Austin Lumberjacks basketball team
