= Incarnate Word Cardinals basketball =

Incarnate Word Cardinals basketball may refer to either of the basketball teams that represent the University of the Incarnate Word:

- Incarnate Word Cardinals men's basketball
- Incarnate Word Cardinals women's basketball
