= Southland Conference Championship =

Southland Conference Championship or Southland Conference Tournament may refer to:

- Southland Conference men's basketball tournament, the men's basketball championship tournament
- Southland Conference women's basketball tournament, the women's basketball championship tournament
- Southland Conference baseball tournament, the baseball championship tournament
