= 2021–22 Incarnate Word Cardinals women's basketball team =

Intercollegiate basketball season

2021–22 Incarnate Word Cardinals women's basketball

Southland tournament champions

NCAA tournament
- Conference: Southland Conference
- Record: 13–16 (5–9 Southland)
- Head coach: Jeff Dow (3rd season)
- Assistant coaches: Tanya Ray; Amber Cunningham; Beverly Holmes
- Home arena: McDermott Center (Capacity: 2,000)

2021–22 Southland Conference women's basketball standings
	Conf.				Overall
Team	W		L	PCT	W		L	PCT
Houston Baptist	12	–	2	.857	16	–	11	.593
Texas A&M–Corpus Christi	11	–	3	.786	19	–	10	.655
Southeastern Louisiana	10	–	4	.714	16	–	11	.593
McNeese State	8	–	6	.571	13	–	15	.464
Incarnate Word †	5	–	9	.357	13	–	17	.433
Northwestern State	5	–	9	.357	12	–	14	.462
New Orleans	3	–	11	.214	5	–	18	.217
Nicholls	2	–	12	.143	4	–	22	.154
† 2022 Southland tournament winner

The 2021–22 Incarnate Word Cardinals women's basketball team represented the University of the Incarnate Word in the 2021–22 NCAA Division I women's basketball season. The Cardinals were led by coach Jeff Dow, in his third season, and are members of the Southland Conference. The Cardinals played their home games at the McDermott Center on campus in San Antonio, Texas. They finished the season 12–16, 5–9 in Southland play, to finish tied in sixth place. In the Southland women's tournament they upset Southeastern Louisiana University to win the championship and gain an automatic berth in the 2022 NCAA Division I women's basketball tournament.

== Roster ==
2021–22 Incarnate Word Cardinals women's basketball team
Players
Coaches

Pos.	#	Name	Height	Year	Previous school	Hometown
G	0	Hanna Wheeler	5 ft 6 in (1.68 m)	So	Cedar Park	Cedar Park, TX
G	1	Kamryn Gibson	5 ft 8 in (1.73 m)	So	Braswell	Little Elm, TX
G	2	Arielle Adams	5 ft 9 in (1.75 m)	Sr	Denver City; Odessa	Lubbock, TX
G	3	Jaaucklyn Moore	5 ft 8 in (1.73 m)	So	Round Rock	Round Rock, TX
G	4	Destiny Jenkins	5 ft 4 in (1.63 m)	RS Jr	Stevens	San Antonio, TX
G	10	Destiny Terrell	5 ft 9 in (1.75 m)	So	Mansfield Summit	Dallas, TX
G	11	Myra Bell	5 ft 10 in (1.78 m)	So	Taft High School	San Antonio, TX
G	12	Ariel Williams	5 ft 9 in (1.75 m)	GS	Lamar	Arlington, TX
F	13	Chloe Storer	5 ft 10 in (1.78 m)	So	Galen	Wangaratta, Australia
F	14	Brenna Perez	6 ft 0 in (1.83 m)	So	Veterans Memorial	San Antonio, TX
G	15	Starr Omozee	5 ft 10 in (1.78 m)	Sr	Pflugerville	Pflugerville, TX
G	24	Zaya Price	5 ft 10 in (1.78 m)	So	Steele	Cibolo, TX
F	32	Tiana Gardner	6 ft 0 in (1.83 m)	Jr	Austin; Temple College	Austin, TX
F	35	Jamie Means	6 ft 1 in (1.85 m)	GS	Denton; UL–Monroe	Denton, TX

Head coach

Jeff Dow (Oregon)

Assistant coach(es)

Tanya Ray (St. Mary's)
Amber Cunningham (Rice)
Beverly Holmes (Millsaps)

Legend

- (C) Team captain
- (S) Suspended
- (I) Ineligible
- (W) Walk-on
- Injured
- Current redshirt

Roster
Last update: April 9, 2024

== Schedule ==
Date time, TV	Rank^{#}	Opponent^{#}	Result	Record	Site (attendance) city, state
Non-conference regular season
Nov 11, 2021*; 8:00 pm		at UTEP	L 47–81	0–1	Don Haskins Center (796); El Paso, TX
Nov 13, 2021*; 5:00 pm, ESPN+		at New Mexico State	L 48–57	0–2	Pan American Center (1,023); Las Cruces, NM
Nov 17, 2021*; 6:00 pm		Texas Lutheran	W 65–50	1–2	McDermott Center (388); San Antonio, TX
Nov 21, 2021*; 12:00 pm		at UTSA	L 60–66	1–3	Convocation Center (394); San Antonio, TX
Nov 29, 2021*; 6:00 pm		Western Illinois	W 63–59	2–3	McDermott Center (108); San Antonio, TX
Dec 4, 2021*; 2:00 pm		Schreiner	W 73–46	3–3	McDermott Center (103); San Antonio, TX
Dec 11, 2021*; 1:00 pm, ESPN+		at Texas–Rio Grande Valley	L 57–62	3–4	UTRGV Fieldhouse (521); Edinburg, TX
Dec 15, 2021*; 6:00 pm		North American	W 88–32	4–4	McDermott Center; San Antonio, TX
Dec 19, 2021*; 1:00 pm, ESPN+		at TCU	Canceled		Schollmaier Arena; Fort Worth, TX
Dec 19, 2021*; 2:00 pm		UC Riverside	W 61–55	5–4	McDermott Center (83); San Antonio, TX
Dec 22, 2021*; 2:00 pm		Tarleton State	L 47–58	5–5	McDermott Center (174); San Antonio, TX
Dec 29, 2021*; 7:00 pm		at Texas Tech	Canceled		United Supermarkets Arena; Lubbock, TX
Southland regular season
Jan 3, 2022; 5:00 pm		vs. Nicholls; Southland Basketball Tip-Off	Canceled		
Jan 9, 2022; 2:00 pm		at Texas A&M–Corpus Christi	L 43–62	5–6 (0–1)	Dugan Wellness Center (226); Corpus Christi, TX
Jan 10, 2022*; 6:00 pm		Champions College	Canceled		McDermott Center; San Antonio, TX
Jan 11, 2022; 6:00 pm		Texas A&M–Corpus Christi	L 53–58	5–7 (0–2)	McDermott Center (109); San Antonio, TX
Jan 15, 2022; 1:00 pm		at Texas A&M–Corpus Christi	L 54–61	5–8 (0–3)	Dugan Wellness Center (784); Corpus Christi, TX
Jan 20, 2022; 5:30 pm		Houston Baptist	L 57–62	5–9 (0–4)	McDermott Center (143); San Antonio, TX
Jan 22, 2022; 2:00 pm		McNeese State	L 57–67	5–10 (0–5)	McDermott Center (115); San Antonio, TX
Jan 27, 2022; 5:30 pm		at Northwestern State	W 52–45	6–10 (1–5)	Prather Coliseum (727); Natchitoches, LA
Jan 29, 2022; 1:00 pm		at Southeastern Louisiana	L 49–76	6–11 (1–6)	University Center (416); Hammond, LA
Feb 3, 2022; 5:30 pm		Nicholls	L 43–47	6–12 (1–7)	McDermott Center; San Antonio, TX
Feb 5, 2022; 2:00 pm, ESPN+		New Orleans	W 54–49	7–12 (2–7)	McDermott Center (174); San Antonio, TX
Feb 10, 2022; 5:00 pm		at Nicholls	W 78–76 ^{OT}	8–12 (3–7)	Stopher Gymnasium (222); Thibodaux, LA
Feb 12, 2022; 2:00 pm, ESPN+		at New Orleans	L 57–78	8–13 (3–8)	Lakefront Arena (548); New Orleans, LA
Feb 17, 2022; 5:30 pm		Northwestern State	W 67–60 ^{OT}	9–13 (4–8)	McDermott Center (119); San Antonio, TX
Feb 19, 2022; 2:00 pm		Southeastern Louisiana	W 57–54	10–13 (5–8)	McDermott Center (146); San Antonio, TX
Feb 24, 2022; 5:00 pm, ESPN+		at Houston Baptist	L 45–51	10–14 (5–9)	Sharp Gymnasium (186); Houston, TX
Feb 26, 2022; 1:00 pm		at McNeese State	L 65–73	10–15 (5–10)	The Legacy Center (1,153); Lake Charles, LA
Mar 5, 2022; 2:00 pm		Texas A&M–Corpus Christi	L 55–60	10–16 (5–11)	McDermott Center (232); San Antonio, TX
Southland tournament
March 10, 2022; 11:00 am, ESPN+	(5)	vs. (8) Nicholls; First round	W 74–73	11–16	Leonard E. Merrell Center; Katy, TX
March 11, 2022; 11:00 am, ESPN+	(5)	vs. (4) McNeese State; Second round	W 90–63	12–16	Leonard E. Merrell Center; Katy, TX
March 12, 2022; 1:00 pm, ESPN+	(5)	vs. (1) Houston Baptist; Semifinals	W 54–33	13–16	Leonard E. Merrell Center; Katy, TX
March 13, 2022; 1:00 pm, CBSSN	(5)	vs. (3) Southeastern Louisiana; Championship	W 56–52 ^{OT}	14–16	Leonard E. Merrell Center; Katy, TX
NCAA tournament
March 16, 2022; 6:00 pm, ESPNU	(16 G)	vs. (16 G) Howard; First Four	L 51–55	14–17	Colonial Life Arena; Columbia, SC
*Non-conference game. ^{#}Rankings from AP Poll. (#) Tournament seedings in parentheses. All times are in Central.

== See also ==
- 2021–22 Incarnate Word Cardinals men's basketball team
