= 2025–26 Lamar Lady Cardinals basketball team =

Intercollegiate basketball season

2025–26 Lamar Lady Cardinals basketball
- Conference: Southland Conference
- Record: 20–11 (17–5 SLC)
- Head coach: Aqua Franklin (7th season)
- Assistant coaches: Charinee Mitchell (2nd season); Raymond Patche (4th season); Omar Sneed (4th season)
- Home arena: Montagne Center (Capacity: 10,080)

2025–26 Southland Conference women's basketball standings
	Conf.				Overall
Team	W		L	PCT	W		L	PCT
McNeese	21	–	1	.955	29	–	6	.829
Lamar	17	–	5	.773	20	–	11	.645
Stephen F. Austin †	16	–	6	.727	25	–	10	.714
UT Rio Grande Valley	16	–	6	.727	21	–	14	.600
Northwestern State	14	–	8	.636	18	–	14	.563
Incarnate Word	11	–	11	.500	13	–	17	.433
Nicholls	10	–	12	.455	15	–	16	.484
East Texas A&M	9	–	13	.409	13	–	17	.433
Houston Christian	6	–	16	.273	8	–	21	.276
Texas A&M–Corpus Christi	5	–	17	.227	6	–	23	.207
Southeastern Louisiana	4	–	18	.182	5	–	24	.172
New Orleans	3	–	19	.136	3	–	27	.100
† 2026 Southland tournament winner

The 2025–26 Lamar Lady Cardinals basketball team represented Lamar University during the 2025–26 NCAA Division I women's basketball season. The Lady Cardinals, led by seventh year head coach Aqua Franklin, played their home games at the Montagne Center in Beaumont, Texas as members of the Southland Conference.

== Media ==
Home games are broadcast on ESPN+.

== Roster ==
2024–25 Lamar Lady Cardinals women's basketball team
Players
Coaches

Pos.	#	Name	Height	Year	Hometown
G/F	0	T'Aaliyah Miner	5 ft 11 in (1.8 m)	GS	New Orleans, Louisiana
G	1	Jacei Denley	5 ft 7 in (1.7 m)	Jr	Beaumont, Texas
G	2	Keyiona McDaniel	5 ft 11 in (1.8 m)	Fr	Kountze, Texas
G	3	Niyah Waters	5 ft 11 in (1.8 m)	Fr	Pflugerville, Texas
G	4	Kamryn Wilson	5 ft 9 in (1.75 m)	So	Grand Prairie, Texas
F/C	6	Solenne Olenga	6 ft 1 in (1.85 m)	Jr	Lubumbashi, DR Congo
G	8	KJ Walker	5 ft 8 in (1.73 m)	Sr	Fort Worth, Texas
F	13	Taliah Hill	6 ft 0 in (1.83 m)	GS	Arlington, Texas
F	15	Molly Powell	6 ft 1 in (1.85 m)	So	Nome, Texas
G	22	Alexis Parker	5 ft 9 in (1.75 m)	Sr	San Antonio, Texas
G	23	Chisom Oguego	5 ft 10 in (1.78 m)	Jr	Lagos, Nigeria
G	30	R'Mani Taylor	5 ft 6 in (1.68 m)	Sr	Houston, Texas
G	44	Shaila Forman	5 ft 9 in (1.75 m)	Fr	Baton Rouge, Louisiana

Head coach

- Aqua Franklin (Texas A&M)

Assistant coach(es)

- Charinee Mitchell (Southeastern Louisiana)
- Raymond Patche (Arizona State)
- Omar Sneed (San Jacinto/Memphis)

Legend

- (C) Team captain
- (S) Suspended
- (I) Ineligible
- (W) Walk-on
- Injured
- Current redshirt

Roster
Last update: December 22, 2024

== Schedule ==
Date time, TV	Rank^{#}	Opponent^{#}	Result	Record	High points	High rebounds	High assists	Site (attendance) city, state
Exhibition
Oct 30, 2025; 6:30 pm		East Texas Baptist	W 86–35		–	–	–	Neches Arena; Beaumont, Texas
Regular season
Nov 8, 2025*; 3:00 pm, ESPN+		at Northern Colorado	L 68–72 ^{OT}	0–1	18 – Forman	6 – Tied	2 – Tied	Bank of Colorado Arena (650); Greeley, Colorado
Nov 10, 2025*; 6:30 pm, ESPN+		at Kansas State	L 61–89	0–2	19 – Forman	5 – Tied	2 – Tied	Bramlage Coliseum (3,204); Manhattan, Kansas
Nov 12, 2025*; 6:30 pm, ESPN+		at Kansas	L 54–65	0–3	19 – Forman	9 – Oguego	3 – Denley	Allen Fieldhouse (3,006); Lawrence, Kansas
Nov 16, 2025*; 2:00 pm, ESPN+		UT Arlington	W 66–55	1–3	15 – Denley	7 – Oguego	3 – Powell	Neches Arena (1,150); Beaumont, TX
Nov 19, 2025*; ESPN+		St. Mary's (TX)	W 61−30	2–3	– -	– -	– -	Neches Arena; Beaumont, TX
Nov 23, 2025*; 2:00 pm, ESPN+		at Louisiana−Monroe	L 47–62	2–4	14 – Wilson	8 – Olenga	3 – Denley	Fant–Ewing Coliseum (879); Monroe, LA
Dec 2, 2025; ESPN+		UT Rio Grande Valley	W 67−59	3–4 (1−0)	– -	– -	– -	Neches Arena; Beaumont, TX
Dec 15, 2025; ESPN+		Texas A&M−Corpus Christi	W 77−49	4–4 (2−0)	– -	– -	– -	Neches Arena; Beaumont, TX
Dec 17, 2025*; ESPN+		Prairie View A&M	W 72−59	5–4	– -	– -	– -	Neches Arena; Beaumont, TX
Dec 21, 2025; ESPN+		at Northwestern State	L 57−60	5–5 (2−1)	– -	– -	– -	Prather Coliseum; Natchitoches, LA
Dec 31, 2025; ESPN+		at East Texas A&M	W 64−48	6–5 (3−1)	– -	– -	– -	University Field House; Commerce, TX
Jan 3, 2026; ESPN+		at McNeese	L 57−65	6–6 (3−2)	– -	– -	– -	Townsley Law Arena; Lake Charles, LA
Jan 8, 2026; ESPN+		Houston Christian	W 66−54	7–6 (4−2)	– -	– -	– -	Neches Arena; Beaumont, TX
Jan 10, 2026; ESPN+		Incarnate Word	W 78−62	8–6 (5−2)	– -	– -	– -	Neches Arena; Beaumont, TX
Jan 15, 2026; ESPN+		at New Orleans	W 72−56	9–6 (6−2)	– -	– -	– -	Lakefront Arena; New Orleans, LA
Jan 17, 2026; 1:00 pm, ESPN+		at Nicholls	W 72−64	10–6 (7−2)	20 – Swift	5 – Swift	2 – McKnight	David R. Stopher Gymnasium (444); Thibodaux, LA
Jan 22, 2026; ESPN+		East Texas A&M	W 66−56	11–6 (8−2)	– -	– -	– -	Neches Arena; Beaumont, TX
Jan 24, 2026; ESPN+		Stephen F. Austin	W 73−63	12–6 (9−2)	– -	– -	– -	Neches Arena; Beaumont, TX
Jan 29, 2026; 6:00 pm, ESPN+		at Southeastern Louisiana	W 57−44	13–6 (10−2)	9 – Taylor	11 – Oguego	3 – Taylor	University Center (215); Hammond, LA
Jan 31, 2026; ESPN+		McNeese	L 52−64	13–7 (10−3)	– -	– -	– -	Neches Arena; Beaumont, TX
Feb 5, 2026; ESPN+		Northwestern State	W 54−45	14–7 (11−3)	– -	– -	– -	Neches Arena; Beaumont, TX
Feb 7, 2026; 2:00 pm, ESPN+		at Stephen F. Austin	L 57−58	14–8 (11−4)	14 – Wilson	10 – Oguego	2 – Denley	William R. Johnson Coliseum (991); Nacogdoches, TX
Feb 12, 2026; 6:30 pm, ESPN+		at UT Rio Grande Valley	L 53−75	14–9 (11−5)	15 – Forman	4 – Olenga	2 – Parker	UTRGV Fieldhouse (1,405); Edinburg, TX
Feb 14, 2026; 1:00 pm, ESPN+		at Texas A&M−Corpus Christi	W 58−52	15–9 (12−5)	12 – Wilson	11 – Olenga	3 – Tied	Hilliard Center (1,089); Corpus Christi, TX
Feb 19, 2026; ESPN+		Nicholls	W 62−52	16–9 (13−5)	– -	– -	– -	Neches Arena; Beaumont, TX
Feb 21, 2026; ESPN+		New Orleans	W 84−54	17–9 (14−5)	– -	– -	– -	Neches Arena; Beaumont, TX
Feb 26, 2026; 6:00 pm, ESPN+		at Houston Christian	W 63−60 ^{OT}	18–9 (15−5)	14 – Olenga	11 – Olenga	6 – Denley	Sharp Gymnasium (499); Houston, TX
Feb 28, 2026; ESPN+		at Incarnate Word	W 80−69	19–9 (16−5)	– -	– -	– -	McDermott Center; San Antonio, TX
Mar 2, 2026; ESPN+		Southeastern Louisiana	W 70−52	20–9 (17−5)	– -	– -	– -	Neches Arena; Beaumont, TX
Southland Conference Tournament
Mar 11, 2026; 1:00 pm, ESPN+	(2)	vs. (3) Stephen F. Austin; Semifinals	L 59−64 ^{OT}	20–10	17 – Miner	15 – Miner	3 – Tied	Townsley Law Arena (3,244); Lake Charles, LA
2026 Women's National Invitation Tournament
March 22, 2026*; 3:00 p.m., ESPN+		Portland; Second round	L 68−78	20–11	16 – Forman	8 – Olenga	4 – Taylor	Chiles Center (512); Portland, OR
*Non-conference game. ^{#}Rankings from AP Poll. (#) Tournament seedings in parentheses. All times are in Central Time.

== See also ==
2025–26 Lamar Cardinals basketball team
