= David McKee (disambiguation) =

David McKee (1935–2022) was a British writer and illustrator.

David McKee may also refer to:

- David McKee (ice hockey) (born 1983), American ice hockey player
- David McKee (American politician) (1828–1862), American politician and Wisconsin pioneer
- Dave McKee (1919–2005), Australian politician

== See also ==
- David McKey (born 1954), basketball coach
