= 2020–21 Lamar Lady Cardinals basketball team =

Intercollegiate basketball season

2020–21 Lamar Lady Cardinals basketball
- Conference: Southland Conference
- Record: 10–14 (9–6 Southland)
- Head coach: Aqua Franklin (2nd season)
- Assistant coaches: Bianca Smith (1st season); Charinee Mitchell (2nd season); Hannah Gentry (1st season)
- Home arena: Montagne Center (Capacity: 10,080)

2020–21 Southland Conference women's basketball standings
	Conf.				Overall
Team	W		L	PCT	W		L	PCT
Stephen F. Austin †	14	–	0	1.000	24	–	3	.889
Southeastern Louisiana	10	–	5	.667	11	–	8	.579
Sam Houston State	9	–	5	.643	15	–	8	.652
Lamar	9	–	6	.600	10	–	14	.417
Central Arkansas	9	–	7	.563	13	–	14	.481
Nicholls	9	–	7	.563	11	–	14	.440
Abilene Christian	6	–	7	.462	14	–	10	.583
Houston Baptist	6	–	7	.462	11	–	11	.500
Incarnate Word	4	–	5	.444	6	–	8	.429
McNeese State	6	–	8	.429	6	–	16	.273
Texas A&M–CC	4	–	7	.364	6	–	13	.316
New Orleans	3	–	12	.200	6	–	15	.286
Northwestern State	1	–	14	.067	1	–	19	.050
† SLC tournament winner As of April 4, 2021; Rankings from AP poll

The 2020–21 Lamar Lady Cardinals basketball team represented Lamar University during the 2020–21 NCAA Division I women's basketball season. The Lady Cardinals, led by second year head coach Aqua Franklin, played their home games at the Montagne Center in Beaumont, Texas as members of the Southland Conference. They finished the season 10–14, 9–6 in Southland play to finish in fourth place. Their season ended with a loss to Central Arkansas in the Southland women's tournament quarter-final round.

This season was the Cardinals' last as members of the Southland Conference. Lamar is one of four schools, all from Texas, that left the Southland in July 2021 to join the Western Athletic Conference.

== Previous season ==
The Lady Cardinals finished the 2019–20 season with an overall record of 10–19. They failed to qualify for the Southland Conference tournament.

== Schedule ==
Date time, TV	Rank^{#}	Opponent^{#}	Result	Record	Site (attendance) city, state
Non-Conference schedule
Nov 25, 2020*; 6:30 pm		at Texas A&M	L 61–77	0–1	Reed Arena (634); College Station, TX
Nov 27, 2020*; 5:45 pm		vs. San Diego State; South Point Thanksgiving Shootout	L 54–60	0–2	South Point Arena; Las Vegas, NV
Nov 28, 2020*; 3:00 pm		vs. Fresno State; South Point Thanksgiving Shootout	L 49–99	0–3	South Point Arena; Las Vegas, NV
Dec 2, 2020*; 2:30 pm, SEC Network		at Texas A&M	L 63–80	0–4	Reed Arena; College Station, TX
Dec 5, 2020*; 2:30 pm, ESPN+		Tarleton State	W 73–58	1–4	Montagne Center (612); Beaumont, TX
Dec 9, 2020*; 11:00 am, ESPN+		at TCU	L 53–79	1–5	Schollmaier Arena (768); Fort Worth, TX
Dec 16, 2020*; 7:00 pm		Southeastern Louisiana	Cancelled		Montagne Center; Beaumont, TX
Dec 19, 2020*; 4:00 pm, ESPN+		at Texas State	L 53–69	1–6	Strahan Coliseum (571); San Marcos, TX
Dec 29, 2020*; 4:00 pm, Longhorn Network		at Texas	L 49–77	1–7	Frank Erwin Center; Austin, TX
January 2, 2021; 1:00 pm		at Abilene Christian	Postponed		Teague Center; Abilene, TX
January 6, 2021; 7:00 pm, ESPN+		Nicholls	W 66–40	2–7 (1–0)	Montagne Center (513); Beaumont, TX
January 9, 2021; 2:00 pm		Houston Baptist	Postponed		Sharp Gym; Houston, TX
January 13, 2021; 7:00 pm, ESPN+		Sam Houston State	L 80–83 ^{OT}	2–8 (1–1)	Montagne Center (511); Beaumont, Texas
January 16, 2021; 2:00 pm, ESPN+		Texas A&M–Corpus Christi	W 54–50	3–8 (2–1)	Montagne Center (633); Beaumont, Texas
January 20, 2021; 6:30 pm		Incarnate Word	Postponed		McDermott Center; San Antonio, TX
January 23, 2021; 2:00 pm, ESPN+		at Stephen F. Austin	L 39–69	3–9 (2–2)	William R. Johnson Coliseum (1,039); Nacogdoches, TX
January 25, 2021; 7:00 pm		at Houston Baptist	Postponed		Sharp Gym; Houston, TX
January 27, 2021; 6:30 pm		at Houston Baptist	W 66–61	4–9 (3–2)	Sharp Gym (100); Houston, TX
January 30, 2021; 2:00 pm		McNeese State	Postponed		Montagne Center; Beaumont, TX
February 3, 2021; 2:00 pm		at Abilene Christian	W 71–65	5–9 (4–2)	Teague Center (234); Abilene, TX
February 6, 2021; 2:00 pm, ESPN+		Abilene Christian	L 65–76 ^{OT}	5–10 (4–3)	Montagne Center (1,239); Beaumont, TX
February 10, 2021; 6:00 pm		at Nicholls	L 77–79 ^{OT}	5–11 (4–4)	Stopher Gym (127); Thibodaux, LA
February 13, 2021; 2:00 pm, ESPN+		Houston Baptist	W 83–54	6–11 (5–4)	Montagne Center (537); Beaumont, TX
February 15, 2021; 7:00 pm		McNeese State	Cancelled		Montagne Center; Beaumont, TX
February 20, 2021; 1:00 pm		Texas A&M–Corpus Christi	W 68–57	7–11 (6–4)	American Bank Center (687); Corpus Christi, TX
February 22, 2021; 6:00 pm		at Sam Houston State	L 55–63	7–12 (6–5)	Bernard Johnson Coliseum (640); Huntsville, TX
February 24, 2021; 7:00 pm, ESPN+		Incarnate Word	W 59–55	8–12 (7–5)	Montagne Center (528); Beaumont, TX
February 27, 2021; 2:00 pm, ESPN+		Stephen F. Austin	L 64–92	8–13 (7–6)	Montagne Center; Beaumont, TX
March 1, 2021; 1:00 pm		at Incarnate Word	W 59–48	9–13 (8–6)	McDermott Center; San Antonio, TX
March 6, 2021; 1:00 pm		at McNeese State	W 68–60	10–13 (9–6)	Burton Coliseum; Lake Charles, LA
Southland Tournament
March 12, 2021; 11:00 am, ESPN+	(4)	vs. (5) Central Arkansas; Quarter Finals	L 55–69	10–14	Merrell Center; Katy, TX
*Non-conference game. ^{#}Rankings from AP Poll. (#) Tournament seedings in parentheses. All times are in Central Time.

== See also ==
2020–21 Lamar Cardinals basketball team
