= Charlotte Mason (coach) =

American basketball and softball coach (1945–2011)

Charlotte "Chickie" Mason
Biographical details
- Born: March 16, 1945; East St. Louis, Illinois, U.S.
- Died: May 14, 2011 (aged 66); Pipe Creek, Texas, U.S.
- Education: Wayland Baptist University; Texas A&M University; Baylor University

Coaching career (HC unless noted)

Women's basketball
- 1968–1976: Eastland HS
- 1976–1979: Tivy HS
- 1979–1984: McLennan CC
- 1984–1986: Lamar
- 1986–1988: Temple JC
- 1988–1990: Nevada
- 1998–2000: Mary Hardin–Baylor

Softball
- 1991: North Dakota
- 1992–1998: UTSA
- 1999: Mary Hardin–Baylor (asst.)
- 2000: Mary Hardin–Baylor
- 2001–2008: Medina Valley HS

Head coaching record
- Overall: WBB: 37-94 (.282); Softball: 216-97 (.690)

Charlotte Ann "Chickie" Mason coached both women's basketball at the college level and softball at the high school and college level. Her coaching experience ranged from the high school level finishing her career at Medina Valley High School in Castroville, Texas, to two-year collegiate programs at McClennan Community College and Temple Junior College to NCAA Division III level at Mary Hardin–Baylor to NCAA Division II level at North Dakota to the NCAA Division I level at Lamar, Nevada, and UTSA.

She helped begin women's programs at two universities, UTSA Roadrunners and University of Mary Hardin–Baylor. She was the first head coach for the UTSA Roadrunners softball program. After leaving UTSA, she became part of the Mary Hardin–Baylor staff in 1998. There, Coach Mason again was instrumental in starting programs in both women's basketball and softball at the university. She is listed as the first head coach for both women's basketball and softball for the Mary Hardin-Baylor Crusaders.

== Early life and education ==
Charlotte Ann Mason was born in East St. Louis, Illinois and moved to San Antonio, Texas at age eight. She also lived in Colorado as a child. Mason graduated from Wayland Baptist University in 1968 and did graduate-level work at Texas A&M University and Baylor University.

== Coaching career ==
Mason began her coaching career in 1968 as girls' basketball coach at Eastland High School in Eastland, Texas. In 1976, she moved to Kerrville, Texas to coach at Tivy High School.

From 1979 to 1984, Mason coached at McLennan Community College in Waco, Texas. She then coached women's basketball at Lamar University from 1984 to 1986, Temple Junior College from 1986 to 1988, and the University of Nevada, Reno from 1988 to 1990.

After nearly two decades as a basketball coach, Mason moved to coaching softball, starting at the University of North Dakota in 1991. Mason returned to Texas after one season to become the first softball head coach at UTSA. In seven seasons (1992 to 1998), Mason posted a 179–166–1 record at UTSA. Mason then coached both women's basketball and softball at the University of Mary Hardin-Baylor from 1998 to 2000, being promoted to head softball coach in 2000 after being a pitching coach in 1999. From 2001 to 2008, she coached softball at Medina High School in Medina, Texas.

== Head coaching record ==
=== Women's basketball ===
Record table
Season	Team	Overall	Conference	Standing	Postseason
Lamar Lady Cardinals (Southland Conference) (1984–1986)
1984–85	Lamar	12–15	7–5	3rd	
1985–86	Lamar	5–21	2–10	6th	
Lamar:		17–36 (.321)	9–15 (.375)		
Nevada Wolf Pack (Big Sky Conference) (1988–1990)
1988–89	Nevada	2–25	0–16	9th	
1989–90	Nevada	6–21	2–14	9th	
Nevada:		8–46 (.148)	2–30 (.063)		
Mary Hardin–Baylor Crusaders (American Southwest Conference) (1999–2000)
1998–99	Mary Hardin–Baylor	14–12	4–4	3rd (West)	NAIA Ind. Midwest Regional
1999–2000	Mary Hardin–Baylor	12–12	7–5	3rd (West)	
Mary Hardin-Baylor:		26–24 (.520)	11–9 (.550)		
Total:		51–106 (.325)			
National champion Postseason invitational champion Conference regular season champion Conference regular season and conference tournament champion Division regular season champion Division regular season and conference tournament champion Conference tournament champion

=== Softball ===
Record table
Season	Team	Overall	Conference	Standing	Postseason
North Dakota Fighting Sioux (North Central Conference) (1991–1991)
1991	North Dakota	17–16	2–4	3rd (Northern)	
North Dakota:		17–16 (.515)	2–4 (.333)		
UTSA Roadrunners (NCAA Division I independent) (1992–1992)
1992	UTSA	15–36			
UTSA Roadrunners (Southland Conference) (1993–1998)
1993	UTSA	21–23	10–16	5th	
1994	UTSA	31–21	20–12	4th	
1995	UTSA	30–18–1	17–15	4th	
1996	UTSA	32–20	15–9	T–3rd	
1997	UTSA	21–30	11–13	6th	
1998	UTSA	31–20	17–8	3rd	
UTSA:		182–67 (.731)	90–73 (.552)		
Mary Hardin-Baylor (American Southwest Conference) (2000)
2000	Mary Hardin-Baylor	17–14	12–4		
Total:		216–97 (.690)			
National champion Postseason invitational champion Conference regular season champion Conference regular season and conference tournament champion Division regular season champion Division regular season and conference tournament champion Conference tournament champion
