= 2013 Southland Conference women's basketball tournament =

- Classification: Division I
- Season: 2012–13
- Teams: 8
- Site: Merrell Center; Katy, Texas
- Champions: Oral Roberts
- MVP: Kevi Luper (Oral Roberts)
- Television: SLC Digital/ESPN3

2012–13 Southland Conference women's basketball standings
	Conf.				Overall
Team	W		L	PCT	W		L	PCT
Oral Roberts†	13	–	5	.722	18	–	13	.581
Sam Houston State	13	–	5	.722	18	–	15	.545
Lamar	12	–	6	.667	22	–	11	.667
Nicholls State	11	–	7	.611	19	–	11	.633
McNeese State	11	–	7	.611	21	–	15	.583
Central Arkansas	8	–	10	.444	15	–	15	.500
Stephen F. Austin	8	–	10	.444	14	–	17	.452
Northwestern State	7	–	11	.389	12	–	18	.400
Southeastern Louisiana	4	–	14	.222	11	–	18	.379
Texas A&M-CC	3	–	15	.167	4	–	25	.138
† 2013 Southland tournament winner Rankings from AP poll

The 2013 Southland Conference women's basketball tournament, a part of the 2012–13 NCAA Division I women's basketball season, took place March 13–16, 2013 at the Merrell Center in Katy, Texas. The winner of the tournament, the Oral Roberts Golden Eagles, received the Southland Conference's automatic bid to the 2013 NCAA tournament.

== Seeds & Regular Season Standings ==
Only the Top 8 teams advance to the Southland Conference tournament. If a team ineligible for the NCAA Tourney should finish in the top 8, their seed will fall to the next eligible team. This chart shows all the teams records and standings and explains why teams advanced to the conference tourney or finished in certain tiebreaking positions. Sources:

2013 Southland Conference women's basketball tournament seeds
Seed	School	Conference Record	Overall Record (End of Regular Season)	Tiebreaker
1.	Oral Roberts	13-5	16-12	
2.	Sam Houston State	13-5	17-11	
3.	Lamar	12-6	20-9	
4.	Nicholls State	11-7	19-10	
5.	McNeese State	11-7	16-13	
6.	Central Arkansas	8-10	15-14	
7.	Stephen F. Austin	8-10	13-16	
8.	Northwestern State	7-11	12-17	
9.	Southeastern Louisiana	8-10	9-19	
10.	Texas A&M-Corpus Christi	3-15	4-25	

== Bracket ==
First round Wednesday, March 13; SLC Digital
5	McNeese State	63
8	Northwestern State	45
6	Central Arkansas	59
7	Stephen F. Austin	64

Quarterfinals; Thursday, March 14; SLC Digital
4	Nicholls State	70
5	McNeese State	86
3	Lamar	69
7	Stephen F. Austin	65

Semifinals; Friday, March 15; ESPN3
1	Oral Roberts	79
5	McNeese State	66
2	Sam Houston State	67
3	Lamar	61

Championship Game; Saturday, March 16; ESPN3
1	Oral Roberts	72
2	Sam Houston State	66

== See also ==
- 2013 Southland Conference men's basketball tournament
- Southland Conference women's basketball tournament
