= 2026 Southland Conference women's basketball tournament =

- Classification: Division I
- Season: 2025–26
- Teams: 8
- Site: Townsley Law Arena; Lake Charles, Louisiana
- Champions: Stephen F. Austin (18th title)
- Winning coach: Leonard Bishop (2nd title)
- Television: ESPN+, ESPNU

2025–26 Southland Conference women's basketball standings
	Conf.				Overall
Team	W		L	PCT	W		L	PCT
McNeese	21	–	1	.955	29	–	6	.829
Lamar	17	–	5	.773	20	–	11	.645
Stephen F. Austin †	16	–	6	.727	25	–	10	.714
UT Rio Grande Valley	16	–	6	.727	21	–	14	.600
Northwestern State	14	–	8	.636	18	–	14	.563
Incarnate Word	11	–	11	.500	13	–	17	.433
Nicholls	10	–	12	.455	15	–	16	.484
East Texas A&M	9	–	13	.409	13	–	17	.433
Houston Christian	6	–	16	.273	8	–	21	.276
Texas A&M–Corpus Christi	5	–	17	.227	6	–	23	.207
Southeastern Louisiana	4	–	18	.182	5	–	24	.172
New Orleans	3	–	19	.136	3	–	27	.100
† 2026 Southland tournament winner

The 2026 Southland Conference women's basketball tournament was the postseason women's basketball tournament for the 2025–26 season of the Southland Conference. The tournament was held March 9–12, 2026, at The Legacy Center in Lake Charles, Louisiana. The tournament winner, Stephen F. Austin received the conference's automatic invitation to the 2026 NCAA Division I women's basketball tournament.

== Seeds ==
Teams were seeded by record within the conference, with a tie-breaker system to seed teams with identical conference records. Eight teams in the conference qualify for the tournament. The top two seeds received double byes into the semifinals in the merit-based format. The No. 3 and No. 4 seeds receive single byes to the quarterfinals. Tie-breakers used were 1) Head-to-head results, 2) comparison of records against individual teams in the conference starting with the top-ranked team(s) and working down and 3) NCAA NET rankings available on day following the conclusion of regular-season play.

Seed	School	Conference	Tie-breaker
1	McNeese	21–1	
2	Lamar	17–5	
3	Stephen F. Austin	16–6	2–0 vs. Northwestern State
4	UT Rio Grande Valley	16–6	1–1 vs. Northwestern State
5	Northwestern State	14–8	
6	Incarnate Word	11–11	
7	Nicholls	10–12	
8	East Texas A&M	9–13	
DNQ	Houston Christian	6–16	
DNQ	Texas A&M–Corpus Christi	5–17	
DNQ	Southeastern Louisiana	4–18	
DNQ	New Orleans	3–19	

== Schedule ==
Session	Game	Time*	Matchup^{#}	Score	Television	Attendance
First round – Monday, March 9, 2026
1	1	11:00 a.m.	No. 5 Northwestern State vs. No. 8 East Texas A&M	69–56	ESPN+	
1	2	1:30 p.m.	No. 6 Incarnate Word vs. No. 7 Nicholls	55–81	ESPN+	
Quarterfinals – Tuesday, March 10, 2026
2	3	11:00 a.m.	No. 4 UT Rio Grande Valley vs. No. 5 Northwestern State	76–67	ESPN+	
2	4	1:30 p.m.	No. 3 Stephen F. Austin vs. No. 7 Nicholls	63–60	ESPN+	
Semifinals – Wednesday, March 11, 2026
3	5	10:30 a.m.	No. 1 McNeese vs. No. 4 UT Rio Grande Valley	67–52	ESPN+	3,244
3	6	1:30 p.m.	No. 2 Lamar vs. No. 3 Stephen F. Austin	59–64^{OT}	ESPN+	3,244
Championship – Thursday, March 12, 2026
4	7	4:00 p.m.	No. 1 McNeese vs. No. 3 Stephen F. Austin	59–71	ESPNU	
*Game times in CDT. #-Rankings denote tournament seeding.

== Bracket ==
First round Monday, March 9 ESPN+
5	Northwestern State	69
8	East Texas A&M	56
6	Incarnate Word	55
7	Nicholls	81

Quarterfinals; Tuesday, March 10; ESPN+
4	UT Rio Grande Valley	76
5	Northwestern State	67
3	Stephen F. Austin	63
7	Nicholls	60

Semifinals; Wednesday, March 11; ESPN+
1	McNeese	67
4	UT Rio Grande Valley	52
2	Lamar	59
3	Stephen F. Austin	64*

Championship; Thursday, March 12; ESPNU
1	McNeese	59
3	Stephen F. Austin	71

* denotes overtime period

== See also ==
- 2026 Southland Conference men's basketball tournament
