= 2021–22 Southland Conference women's basketball season =

- League: NCAA Division I
- Sport: Basketball
- Teams: 8
- TV partner: ESPN+

Regular season

Southland Conference tournament

Southland Conference women's basketball seasons
- ← 2020–21 2022–23 →

2021–22 Southland Conference women's basketball standings
	Conf.				Overall
Team	W		L	PCT	W		L	PCT
Houston Baptist	12	–	2	.857	16	–	11	.593
Texas A&M–Corpus Christi	11	–	3	.786	19	–	10	.655
Southeastern Louisiana	10	–	4	.714	16	–	11	.593
McNeese State	8	–	6	.571	13	–	15	.464
Incarnate Word †	5	–	9	.357	13	–	17	.433
Northwestern State	5	–	9	.357	12	–	14	.462
New Orleans	3	–	11	.214	5	–	18	.217
Nicholls	2	–	12	.143	4	–	22	.154
† 2022 Southland tournament winner

The 2021–22 Southland Conference women's basketball season is scheduled to begin with practices in October 2021 followed by the 2021–22 NCAA Division I women's basketball season in November 2021. The conference is scheduled to begin in December 2021. This was the 35th season under the Southland Conference name.

The Southland Conference tournament is scheduled for March 9–13, 2022 at the Merrell Center in Katy, Texas.

== Pre-season ==
=== Preseason polls ===
==== Southland Conference Coaches' Poll ====
Women's Basketball Preseason Poll (Coaches)
Place	Team	Points	First place votes
1.	Southeastern Louisiana	168	13
2.	Houston Baptist	148	1
3.	Incarnate Word	147	—
4.	Nicholls	136	1
5.	Texas A&M–Corpus Christi	133	―
6.	McNeese State	110	―
7.	New Orleans	90	―
8.	Northwestern State	89	―

=== Southland Conference Preseason All-Conference ===
==== Preseason All-Southland First Team ====
Key
Symbol	Meaning
†	2020-21 All-Conference Team Member automatically earns a spot on the first team

Name	School	Pos.	Yr.	Ht.	Hometown (Last School)
Timia Jefferson †	Houston Baptist	Jr.	G	5'9	Mansfield, TX (Timberview HS)
Hailey Giaratano †	Southeastern Louisiana	So.	G	5'10	Ponchatoula, LA (Ponchatoula HS)
Morgan Carrier †	Southeastern Louisiana	Sr.	G/F	5'9	New Iberia, LA (New Iberia HS)
Divine Tanks †	McNeese State	Jr.	F	6'1	Lake Charles, LA (Barbe HS)
Chelsea Cain †	Nicholls	Jr.	F	6'0	Prairieville, LA, (Dutchtown HS)

==== Preseason All-Southland Second Team ====
Name	School	Pos.	Yr.	Ht.	Hometown (Last School)
Kennedy Wilson	Houston Baptist	Jr.	G	5'6	Mansfield, TX (Timberview HS)
Jaaucklyn Moore	Incarnate Word	So.	G	5'8	Round Rock, TX (Round Rock HS)
Chyna Allen	Nicholls	Sr.	G	5'7	Gulfport, MS (Jones College)
Caitlyn Williams	Southeastern Louisiana	Sr.	F	6'0	Brusly, LA (Brusly HS)
Alecia Westbrook	Texas A&M–Corpus Christi	Jr.	F/C	6'1	Kansas City, MO (Park Hill South HS)

=== Midseason watchlists ===
Below is a table of notable midseason watch lists.

Wooden	Naismith	Liberman	Drysdale	Miller	McClain	Leslie	Wade

=== Final watchlists ===
Below is a table of notable year end watch lists.

Wooden	Naismith	Liberman	Drysdale	Miller	McClain	Leslie	Wade

== Regular season ==
=== Records against other conferences ===
2021–22 records against non-conference foes as of (January 9, 2022):

Regular season

Power 7 Conferences	Record
American	0–5
ACC	0–0
Big East	0–1
Big Ten	0–0
Big 12	0–6
Pac-12	0–2
SEC	0–4
Power 7 Conferences Total	0–18
Other NCAA Division 1 Conferences	Record
America East	1–0
A-10	0–0
ASUN	0–0
Big Sky	0–2
Big South	0–0
Big West	1–0
CAA	0–0
C-USA	0–5
Horizon	0–0
Ivy League	0–0
MAAC	0–0
MAC	0–0
MEAC	0–0
MVC	0–0
Mountain West	0–2
NEC	0–0
OVC	0–0
Patriot League	0–0
SoCon	0–0
Summit League	1–1
SWAC	4–3
Sun Belt	3–7
WAC	1–12
WCC	1–0
Other Division I Total	12–32
Division II Total	2–0
Division III Total	7–0
NCAA Division I Total	12–50
NAIA Conferences	Record
AMC	0–0
GCAC	1–0
GPAC	0–0
NSAA	0–0
RRAC	4–0
SAC	3–0
SSAC	1–0
NAIA Total	9–0
NCCAA Conferences	Record
Division I - Central	1–0
NCCAA Total	1–0
Other teams	Record
Non-NCAA, non-NAIA and non-NCCAA teams	1–0

Post Season

Power 7 Conferences	Record
American	0–0
ACC	0–0
Big East	0–0
Big Ten	0–0
Big 12	0–0
Pac-12	0–0
SEC	0–0
Power 7 Conferences Total	0–0
Other NCAA Division 1 Conferences	Record
America East	0–0
A-10	0–0
ASUN	0–0
Big Sky	0–0
Big South	0–0
Big West	0–0
CAA	0–0
C-USA	0–0
Horizon	0–0
Ivy League	0–0
MAAC	0–0
MAC	0–0
MEAC	0–0
MVC	0–0
Mountain West	0–0
NEC	0–0
OVC	0–0
Patriot League	0–0
SoCon	0–0
Summit League	0–0
SWAC	0–0
Sun Belt	0–0
WAC	0–0
WCC	0–0
Other Division I Total	0–0
NCAA Division I Total	0–0

=== Record against ranked non-conference opponents ===
This is a list of games against ranked opponents only (rankings from the AP Poll):

Date	Visitor	Home	Site	Significance	Score	Conference record
Nov 9	Texas A&M–Corpus Christi	No. 23 Texas A&M	Reed Arena ● College Station, TX	South Texas Showdown	L 54–87	0–1
Nov 9	New Orleans	No. 25 Texas	Frank Erwin Center ● Austin, TX	―	L 36–131	0–2
Nov 15	New Orleans	No. 6 Baylor	Ferrell Center ● Waco, TX	―	L 39–78	0–3
Dec 18	New Orleans	No. 22 LSU	Pete Maravich Assembly Center ● Baton Rouge, LA	Canceled due to COVID-19		
Dec 29	Houston Baptist	No. 10 Baylor	Ferrell Center ● Waco, TX	Canceled due to COVID-19		

Team rankings are reflective of AP poll when the game was played, not current or final ranking

† denotes game was played on neutral site

== Awards and honors ==
=== Players of the Week ===
Throughout the conference regular season, the Southland Conference offices named one or two players of the week each Monday.

Week	Player of the Week	School	Ref.
Nov. 15	Jordan Todd	Northwestern State	
Nov. 22	Timia Jefferson	Houston Baptist	
Nov. 29	Alecia Westbrook	Texas A&M–Corpus Christi	
Dec. 6	Jiselle Woodson	Northwestern State	
Dec. 13	Candice Parramore	Northwestern State	
Dec. 20	Monette Bolden	Northwestern State	
Dec. 27	Bryanna Washington	Nicholls	
Jan. 3	DeArica Pryor	New Orleans	
Jan. 10	Alecia Westbrook (2)	Texas A&M–Corpus Christi	
Jan. 17	Chelsea Cain	Nicholls	
Jan. 24	Alecia Westbrook (3)	Texas A&M–Corpus Christi	
Jan. 31	Caitlyn Williams	Southeastern	
Feb. 7	Caitlyn Williams (2)	Southeastern	
Feb. 14	Jordan Todd (2)	Northwestern State	
TBD	―	―	
TBD	―	―	
TBD	―	―	
TBD	―	―	

==== Totals per School ====
School	Total
Northwestern State	5
Texas A&M–Corpus Christi	3
Nicholls	2
Southeastern	2
Houston Baptist	1
New Orleans	1
