= 2022 Southland Conference women's basketball tournament =

- Classification: Division I
- Season: 2021–22
- Teams: 8
- Site: Merrell Center; Katy, Texas
- Champions: Incarnate Word (1st title)
- Winning coach: Jeff Dow (1st title)
- MVP: Tiana Gardner (Incarnate Word)
- Attendance: 2,843 (total); 744 (championship)
- Television: ESPN+, CBSSN

The 2022 Southland Conference women's basketball tournament was the postseason women's basketball tournament for the 2021–22 season in the Southland Conference. The tournament took place March 10–13, 2022. The tournament winner received an automatic invitation to the 2022 NCAA Division I women's basketball tournament.

2021–22 Southland Conference women's basketball standings
	Conf.				Overall
Team	W		L	PCT	W		L	PCT
Houston Baptist	12	–	2	.857	16	–	11	.593
Texas A&M–Corpus Christi	11	–	3	.786	19	–	10	.655
Southeastern Louisiana	10	–	4	.714	16	–	11	.593
McNeese State	8	–	6	.571	13	–	15	.464
Incarnate Word †	5	–	9	.357	13	–	17	.433
Northwestern State	5	–	9	.357	12	–	14	.462
New Orleans	3	–	11	.214	5	–	18	.217
Nicholls	2	–	12	.143	4	–	22	.154
† 2022 Southland tournament winner

== Seeds ==
Teams were seeded by record within the conference, with a tie-breaker system to seed teams with identical conference records. All eight teams in the conference qualified for the tournament. The top two seeds received double byes into the semifinals in the merit-based format. The No. 3 and No. 4 seeds received single byes to the quarterfinals. Tiebreakers used are 1) Head-to-head results, 2) comparison of records against individual teams in the conference starting with the top-ranked team(s) and working down and 3) NCAA NET rankings available on the day following the conclusion of regular-season play.

Seed	School	Conference	Tiebreaker
1	Houston Baptist	12-2	
2	Texas A&M-CC	11-3	
3	Southeastern Louisiana	10–4	
4	McNeese State	8-6	
5	Incarnate Word	5-9	2-0 vs. Northwestern State
6	Northwestern State	5–9	0-2 vs. Incarnate Word
7	New Orleans	3-11	
8	Nicholls	2-12	

== Schedule ==
Session	Game	Time*	Matchup^{#}	Score	Television	Attendance
First round – Thursday, March 10, 2022
1	1	11:00 am	No. 5 Incarnate Word vs. No. 8 Nicholls	74–73	ESPN+	601
1	2	1:30 pm	No. 6 Northwestern State vs. No. 7 New Orleans	48-57	ESPN+	601
Quarterfinals – Friday, March 11, 2022
2	3	11:00 am	No. 4 McNeese vs. No. 5 Incarnate Word	63-90	ESPN+	644
2	4	1:30 pm	No. 3 Southeastern Louisiana vs. No. 7 New Orleans	80-66	ESPN+	644
Semifinals – Saturday, March 12, 2022
3	5	1:00 pm	No. 1 Houston Baptist vs. No. 5 Incarnate Word	33-54	ESPN+	854
3	6	3:30 pm	No. 2 Texas A&M-CC vs. No. 3 Southeastern Louisiana	54-59*	ESPN+	854
Championship – Sunday, March 13, 2022
4	7	1:00 pm	No. 5 Incarnate Word vs. No. 3 Southeastern Louisiana	56–52*	CBSSN	744
*Game times in CDT. #-Rankings denote tournament seeding.

== Bracket ==
First round Thursday, March 10; ESPN+
5	Incarnate Word	74
8	Nicholls	73
6	Northwestern State	48
7	New Orleans	57

Second round Friday, March 11; ESPN+
4	McNeese	63
5	Incarnate Word	90
3	Southeastern Louisiana	80
7	New Orleans	66

Semifinals; Saturday, March 12; ESPN+
1	Houston Baptist	33
5	Incarnate Word	54
2	Texas A&M-CC	54
3	Southeastern Louisiana	59*

Championship; Sunday, March 13; CBSSN
5	Incarnate Word	56*
3	Southeastern Louisiana	52

* denotes number of overtime periods
