= David McKey =

Biographical details
- Born: December 3, 1954 (age 71)
- Education: Lamar University

Coaching career (HC unless noted)
- 1984–1994: St. Edward's
- 1995–1998: Lamar

Head coaching record
- Overall: 260–150 (.634)

Accomplishments and honors

Awards
- Sun Belt Conference Coach of the Year, 1995; NAIA District Coach of the Year, 3 times; Big State Conference Coach of the Year, 3 times

David McKey (born December 3, 1954) coached women's basketball at St. Edward's University (1984–1994) and Lamar University (1995–1998). Coach McKey's teams at St. Edward's had the most wins in program history as of December 9, 2013 with a record of 220–79. His Hilltopper teams played in two NAIA Final Fours, in three NAIA National Tournaments in addition to winning six conference championships and eight-straight winning seasons. He received District Coach of the Year awards three times as well as Big State Conference Coach of the Year three times. Coach McKey was awarded Sun Belt Conference Coach of the Year in his first season with the Lady Cardinals at Lamar University.

== Head coaching record ==
Record table
Season	Team	Overall	Conference	Standing	Postseason
St. Edward's Hilltoppers (Big State Conference (NAIA)) (1984–1994)
1984–85	St. Edward's	12–13	3–7		
1985–86	St. Edward's	15–13	2–8		
1986–87	St. Edward's	20–8	6–4	1st	
1987–88	St. Edward's	29–4	10–0	1st	NAIA Tournament (District Champion)
1988–89	St. Edward's	20–9	8–2		
1989–90	St. Edward's	26–6	9–1	T-1st	
1990–91	St. Edward's	31–2	9–1	1st	NAIA Tournament (District Champion)
1991–92	St. Edward's	30–3	10–0	1st	NAIA Tournament Final Four
1992–93	St. Edward's	28–3	10–0	1st	NAIA Tournament Final Four, District Champion
St. Edward's:		220–79 (.736)	69–31 (.690)		
Lamar Lady Cardinals (Sun Belt Conference) (1994–1998)
1994–95	Lamar	16–12	10–4		
1995–96	Lamar	14–15	8–6		
1996–97	Lamar	5–22	2–12		
1997–98	Lamar	5–22	2–12		
Lamar:		40–71 (.360)	22–34 (.393)		
Total:		260–150 (.634)			
National champion Postseason invitational champion Conference regular season champion Conference regular season and conference tournament champion Division regular season champion Division regular season and conference tournament champion Conference tournament champion
