= Lamar Lady Cardinals basketball =

Lamar Lady Cardinals
2025–26 Lamar Lady Cardinals basketball team
- University: Lamar University
- Head coach: Aqua Franklin (6th season)
- Location: Beaumont, Texas
- Arena: Montagne Center (capacity: 10,080)
- Conference: Southland
- Nickname: Lady Cardinals
- Colors: Red and white
- Student section: The Flock

NCAA Division I tournament Elite Eight
- 1991
Other NCAA Division I tournament results
Sweet Sixteen	1991
Appearances	1991, 2010

Conference tournament champions
- American South: 1991; Southland: 2010

Conference regular-season champions
- American South: 1991; Sun Belt: 1992; Southland: 2010, 2014, 2018, 2019, 2024

Conference division champions
- Southland: 2008 (East), 2010 (West)

Uniforms
Home	Away

The Lamar Lady Cardinals basketball team represents Lamar University in NCAA Division I women's basketball competition. The team plays in the 10,080 seat Montagne Center. The Lady Cardinals currently compete at the NCAA Division I level in the Southland Conference.

== History ==
The Lady Cardinals have competed as members of four conferences at the NCAA Division I level. Lamar competed in the Southland Conference beginning in 1983. The Lady Cardinals competed in the American South Conference from 1987 to 1991. From 1991 to 1998, the Lady Cardinals competed as members of the Sun Belt Conference. Lamar returned to the Southland Conference beginning with the 1998–99 season. The Lady Cardinals moved to the Western Athletic Conference in 2021 rejoining the Southland Conference on July 11, 2022 after one year in the WAC.

=== Al Barbre years ===
In the 1991 NCAA Division I women's basketball tournament Lamar, under coach Al Barbre, made a run as a tenth seed in the Austin regional. The 1991 Lady Cardinals defeated Texas, LSU and Arkansas before being defeated by Virginia in the Elite Eight. Virginia went on to lose in the National championship game by 3 points.

=== Larry Tidwell years ===
Larry Tidwell coached the women's basketball team from 2007 through the end of the 2012-2013 season. Coach Tidwell turned the team around from a struggling program to a perennial power in the Southland Conference. In 2010 the team won the regular season and conference tournament to advance to the 2010 NCAA tournament. The Lady Cardinals made their first ever appearance in the preseason WNIT in the fall of 2010. In the 2011 season, coach Tidwell's Lady Cardinals received their first top 100 RPI ranking (RPI #80) since the figures were made public in the 2005 season. The 2010-2011 squad finished with a record of 25-8 and made an appearance in the 2011 post season WNIT.

Coach Tidwell resigned his position in March, 2013 to take a position at University of Texas-Pan American as head women's basketball coach.

=== Robin Harmony years ===
Robin Harmony was named head coach on April 30, 2013 and remained until April 2019. Her first Lady Cardinal team shared the Southland Conference regular season title. The Lady Cardinals also participated in their second WNIT and fourth post season tournament appearance in five seasons. The Lady Cardinals competed in the WBI tournament in 2017. The team won the 2017-18 Southland Conference regular season title repeating as champions in 2018-19. The Lady Cardinals represented the Southland Conference in the Women's National Invitation Tournament for the third and the fourth time.

Coach Harmony resigned her position on April 19, 2019 to become head women's basketball coach for the College of Charleston.

=== Aqua Franklin years ===
Aqua Franklin was named head coach on May 1, 2019 becoming the 14th women's basketball head coach in program history. Her 2024 team won the Southland Conference regular season championship. Franklin was named as 2023–24 conference coach of the year.

=== Year-by-year results ===
Statistics overview
Season	Coach	Overall	Conference	Standing	Postseason
AIAW (Independent) (1969–1982)
1969–1970	Marilyn Krause	2–9			
1970–1971	Marilyn Krause	7–9			
1971–1972	Marilyn Krause	13–10			
Marilyn Krause:		22–28	–		
1972–1973	Pat Park	19–11			
1973–1974	Pat Park	11–12			
1974–1975	Pat Park	23–11			
1975–1976	Pat Park	22–8			
1976–1977	Pat Park	13–17			
1977–1978	Pat Park	21–13			
Pat Park:		109–72	–		
1978–1979	Cindy Russo	16–11			
1979–1980	Cindy Russo	20–11			
Cindy Russo:		36–22	–		
1980–1981	Iwana McGee	7–20			
Iwana McGee:		7–22	–		
1981–1982	Pat Ramsey	11–18			
Southland Conference (1982–1987)
1982–1983	Pat Ramsey	15–12	1–4	4th	
1983–1984	Pat Ramsey	10–17	4–8	6th	
Pat Ramsey:		36–47	5–12		
1984–1985	Charlotte (Chickie) Mason	12–15	7–5	3rd	
1985–1986	Charlotte (Chickie) Mason	5–21	2–10	6th	
Charlotte (Chickie) Mason:		17–36	9–15		
1986–1987	Al Barbre	2–24	1–11	7th	
American South Conference (1987–1991)
1987–1988	Al Barbre	14–14	4–5		
1988–1989	Al Barbre	18–10	6–4		
1989–1990	Al Barbre	19–10	7–3		
1990–1991	Al Barbre	29*–4	12*–0	1st	NCAA (Elite Eight)
Al Barbre:		82–62	30–23		
Sun Belt Conference (1991–1998)
1991–1992	Liz McQuitter	21–7	13–3	1st T	
1992–1993	Liz McQuitter	10–16	4–10		
1993–1994	Liz McQuitter	8–19	5–9		
Liz McQuitter:		39–42	22–22		
1994–1995	David McKey	16–12	10–4		
1995–1996	David McKey	14–15	8–6		
1996-1997	David McKey	5–22	2–12		
1997–1998	David McKey	5–22	2–12		
David McKey:		40–71	22–34		
Southland Conference (1998–Present)
1998–1999	De Ann Craft	9–17	6–12	9th	
1999–2000	De Ann Craft	10–17	5–13	8th	
2000–2001	De Ann Craft	12–16	10–10	6th	
2001–2002	De Ann Craft	8–20	6–14	9th	
De Ann Craft:		39–70	27–49		
2002–2003	Leonard Drake	3–24	2–18	11th	
2003–2004	Leonard Drake	4–22	1–15	10th	
2004–2005	Leonard Drake	9–18	3–13	11th	
2005–2006	Leonard Drake	7–20	2–14	8th	
2006–2007	Leonard Drake	13–17	8–8	7th T	
Leonard Drake:		36–101	16–68		
2007–2008	Larry Tidwell	19–13	10–6	2nd	
2008–2009	Larry Tidwell	20–11	10–6	4th T	
2009-2010	Larry Tidwell	26–8	13–3	1st T	NCAA (1st Round)
2010–2011	Larry Tidwell	25–8	13–3	2nd	WNIT (1st Round)
2011–2012	Larry Tidwell	16–15	8–8	5th T	
2012–2013	Larry Tidwell	22–11	12–6	3rd	WBI (2nd Round)
Larry Tidwell:		128–66	66–32		
2013–2014	Robin Harmony	18–13	13–5	1st T	WNIT (1st Round)
2014–2015	Robin Harmony	17–13	14–4	2nd	
2015–2016	Robin Harmony	12–19	7–11	8th T	
2016–2017	Robin Harmony	22–8	15–3	3rd	WBI (1st Round)
2017–2018	Robin Harmony	22–6	17–1	1st	WNIT First round
2018–2019	Robin Harmony	24–7	17–1	1st	WNIT First round
Robin Harmony:		115–66	83–25		
2019–2020	Aqua Franklin	10–19	6–14	10th	
2020–2021	Aqua Franklin	10–14	9–6	4th	
Western Athletic Conference (2021–2023)
2021–2022	Aqua Franklin	14–15	8–10	7th T	
Southland Conference (2022–present)
2022–2023	Aqua Franklin	20–12	12–6	3rd	SLC tournament finalist.
2023–2024	Aqua Franklin	24-7	17–1	1st	WBIT First Round
2024–2025	Aqua Franklin	22-8	17–3	2nd	SLC Tournament Semifinalist
2025–2026	Aqua Franklin	20-11	17–5	2nd	WBIT Second Round
Aqua Franklin:		120-85	86–45		
Total:		764-758 (.502)			
National champion Postseason invitational champion Conference regular season champion Conference regular season and conference tournament champion Division regular season champion Division regular season and conference tournament champion Conference tournament champion

Notes: *1990-1991 wins vacated by the NCAA
*The Lady Cardinals competed in the AIAW through 1982. From that point forward, they competed in NCAA Division I.

=== Yearly attendance ===
Below is the Lady Cardinals' home attendance since the 2004–05 season.

Season	Average	High
Yearly Home Attendance
2022-23	1,089	1,458
2021-22	882	1,512
2020-21	572	1,239
2019-20	1,142	3,856
2018-19	1,992	5,218
2017-18	720	1,297
2016-17	708	921
2015-16	694	888
2014-15	793	997
2013-14	764	891
2012-13	725	1,232
2011-12	1,005	2,427
2010-11	1,555	4,164
2009-10	1,040	1,902
2008-09	393	1,012
2007-08	461	1,187
2006-07	328	1,071
2005-06	359	560
2004-05	383	531

As of the 2022-23 season.

Record single game home attendance for a women's game (9,143) was set in a second-round game of the 1991 NCAA Division I women's basketball tournament played in the Montagne Center against the LSU Tigers on March 17, 1991.

== Postseason ==
=== NCAA Division I Tournament results ===
The Cardinals have appeared in two NCAA Division I Tournaments, all as Lamar University. Their combined record is 3–2.

Year	Seed	Round	Opponent	Result/Score
NCAA Division I Tournament Results
1991	#10	First Round; Second Round; Sweet Sixteen; Elite Eight	#7 Texas #2 LSU #3 Arkansas #1 Virginia	W 77–63; W 93–73; W 91–75; L 70–85
2010	#14	First Round	#3 West Virginia	L 48–58

=== WNIT results ===
The Cardinals have appeared in four Women's National Invitation Tournaments (WNIT). Their combined record is 0–4.

Year	Round	Opponent	Result/Score
WNIT Results
2011	First Round	Arkansas	L 65–91
2014	First Round	Southern Mississippi	L 50–75
2018	First Round	TCU	L 68–80
2019	First Round	South Alabama	L 71–73
2026	Second Round	Portland	L 68–78

=== WBI results ===
The Cardinals have appeared in two Women's Basketball Invitational Tournaments (WBI). Their record is 1–2.

Year	Round	Opponent	Result/Score
WBI Results
2013	First Round; Second Round	Presbyterian; South Dakota	W 70–48; L 48–71
2017	First Round	Rice	L 72–73

== Awards and honors ==
=== Western Athletic Conference ===
==== Freshman of the Year ====
- Akasha Davis, 2021

=== Southland Conference ===
==== Coach of the Year ====
- Robin Harmony, 2018

==== Player of the Year ====
- Shawnta Vanzant, 2001
- Jenna Plumley, 2010

==== Defensive Player of the Year ====
- Chastadie Barrs, 2016, 2017, 2018

==== All Conference First Team ====
- Kara Audery, 1983, 84
- Joy Ommen, 1983
- Talla Goudy, 1999
- Shawnta Vanzant, 2001
- LaToya Carson, 2006
- Tamara Abalde, 2008
- Jenna Plumley, 2010, 11
- Kallis Lloyd, 2011, 12, 13
- Gia Ayers, 2014
- JaMeisha Edwards, 2015
- Chastadie Barrs, 2018
- Moe Kinard, 2018
- Akasha Davis, 2022

==== Newcomer of the Year ====
- Shawnta Vanzant, 2001
- Darika Hill, 2009
- Jenna Plumley, 2010
- Monique Whitaker, 2011
- Moe Kinard, 2017

==== Freshman of the Year ====
- Brittney Williams, 2007
- Tamara Abalde, 2008
- Kiara Desamours, 2016
- Jadyn Pimentel, 2018

==== All-Conference Defensive Team ====
- Kallis Lloyd, 2013
- Careen Baylor, 2013
- Gia Ayers, 2014
- JaMeisha Edwards, 2015
- Chastadie Barrs, 2016, 2017, 2018
- Kiandra Bowers, 2018

==== Southland Conference individual record holders ====
- Most three-pointers made (season) - Jenna Plumley (100) - 2010
- Most three-pointers made (career) - Jenna Plumley (205) - 2007-11
- Most three-pointers attempted (season) - Jenna Plumley (298) - 2010
- Most three-pointers attempted (career) - Jenna Plumley (869) - 2007-11
- Highest three-point goal percentage (game) - Emily Spickler (7-7) - 2009
- Highest three-point goal percentage (season) - Emily Spickler (58-118) - 2009
- Highest three-point goal percentage (career) - Emily Spickler (100-232) - 2007-09
- Highest free throw percentage (career) - Jenna Plumley (234-278) - 2007-11
- Most rebounds (game) - Anna Strickland (31) - 2016
- Most steals (game) - Neno Anguiano (13) - 2000 (tied)
- Most steals (season) - Chastadie Barrs (191) - 2018
- Most steals (career) - Chastadies Barrs (451)

=== American South Conference ===
==== All-Conference First Team ====
- Cassie Brooks, 1988, 1989
- Uirannah Jackson, 1990
- Brenda Hatchett, 1991
- Barbara Hickey, 1991

==== Newcomer of the Year ====
- Cassie Brooks, 1988
- Uirannah Jackson, 1989

==== Coach of the Year ====
- Al Barbre, 1988 (shared), 1989 (shared), 1991

=== Sun Belt Conference ===
==== All-Conference First Team ====
- Brenda Hatchett, 1992
- Barbara Hickey, 1992
- Uirannah Jackson, 1992
- Travesa Gant, 1994
- Lisa McMahon, 1995
- Lara Webb, 1996 (Unanimous)

==== All Tournament Team ====
- Lara Webb, 1996

==== Freshman of the Year ====
- Lisa McMahon, 1995
- Jwanda Roberson, 1998

==== Coach of the Year ====
- David McKey, 1995
