= McNeese Cowgirls basketball =

2026–27 McNeese Cowgirls basketball team
- University: McNeese State University
- Head coach: Ashton Feldhaus (1st season)
- Location: Lake Charles, Louisiana
- Arena: Townsley Law Arena (capacity: 4,200)
- Conference: Southland
- Nickname: Cowgirls
- Colors: Royal blue and gold

NCAA Division I tournament appearances
- 2011, 2012

Conference tournament champions
- 2011, 2012

Conference regular-season champions
- 1986 T, 2011, 2026

Uniforms
Home	Away

The McNeese Cowgirls basketball team is the women's basketball team that represents McNeese State University in Lake Charles, Louisiana. The team competes in the Southland Conference and plays its home games at the Townsley Law Arena. The Cowgirls are coached by Ashton Feldhaus.

== Roster ==
2024–25 McNeese Cowgirls women's basketball team
Players
Coaches

Pos.	#	Name	Height	Year	Previous school	Hometown
G	1	Azjah Reeves	5 ft 8 in (1.73 m)	So	Harding Prep	Oklahoma City, Oklahoma
F	2	Julia Puente	6 ft 2 in (1.88 m)	Jr	Murray State	Barcelona, Spain
G	4	Paris Guillory	5 ft 7 in (1.7 m)	So	Louisiana Tech	Lake Charles, Louisiana
G	6	Avery Young	5 ft 7 in (1.7 m)	Jr	Pearl River Community College	Iota, Louisiana
G	7	Tyrielle Williams	5 ft 7 in (1.7 m)	Jr	South Alabama	New Orleans, Louisiana
F	12	Alva Mofalk	6 ft 4 in (1.93 m)	So	Luleå Academy	Luleå, Sweden
G	13	Lyla Kahrimanovic	5 ft 11 in (1.8 m)	Fr	Woodinville High School	Woodinville, Washington
G	14	Mireia Yespes	6 ft 2 in (1.88 m)	Sr	Cirvianum De Torrello` Institute	Barcelona, Spain
C	20	Sydney McQuietor	6 ft 2 in (1.88 m)	Sr	Boise State	Keller, Texas
G	21	Boston Berry	5 ft 7 in (1.7 m)	So	Jones High School	Jones, Oklahoma
F	22	Kiayra Ellis	6 ft 0 in (1.83 m)	Sr	Arkansas State	Shreveport, Louisiana
C	35	Wilnie Joseph	6 ft 5 in (1.96 m)	Sr	Louisiana	Greenwood, Indiana
G	41	Kyla Davis	5 ft 9 in (1.75 m)	Sr	New Orleans	Fort Worth, Texas
F	44	Daniela Vallecilla	6 ft 4 in (1.93 m)	RS Fr	Cypress Ranch High School	Houston, Texas

Head coach

- Lynn Kennedy (Bushnell)

Assistant coach(es)

- Mike Pittman (Grambling State)
- Sydney Schultz (Portland State)
- Kylie Jimenez (Portland State)
- Le'Shenae Stubblefield (McNeese State)

Legend

- (C) Team captain
- (S) Suspended
- (I) Ineligible
- (W) Walk-on
- Injured
- Current redshirt

Roster
Last update: March 15, 2025

== NCAA tournament results ==
Year	Seed	Round	Opponent	Result
2011	#15	First Round	#2 Texas A&M	L 47-87
2012	#15	First Round	#2 Kentucky	L 62-68
