= Incarnate Word Cardinals women's basketball =

| 2025–26 Incarnate Word Cardinals women's basketball team |
- University: University of the Incarnate Word
- Head coach: Jhasmin Player (1st season)
- Location: San Antonio, Texas
- Arena: McDermott Convocation Center (capacity: 2,000)
- Conference: Southland
- Nickname: Cardinals
- Colors: Red, white, and black

NCAA Division I tournament appearances
- D I 2022; D II 2009

NAIA tournament appearances
- D I 1998, 1999

Conference tournament champions
- 2022

For information on all University of the Incarnate Word sports, see Incarnate Word Cardinals

The Incarnate Word Cardinals women's basketball team is the women's basketball team that represents University of the Incarnate Word in San Antonio, Texas. The team currently competes in the Southland Conference.

== Roster ==
2024–25 Incarnate Word Cardinals women's basketball team
Players
Coaches

| Pos. | # | Name | Height | Year | Previous school | Hometown |
|---|---|---|---|---|---|---|
| G | 1 | Dorian Norris | 5 ft 11 in (1.8 m) | GS | Texas A&M–Commerce | Lake Dallas, Texas |
| F | 2 | Kaylee Howell | 6 ft 2 in (1.88 m) | Jr | Rockport-Fulton High School | Rockport, Texas |
| G | 3 | Shiho Isono | 5 ft 6 in (1.68 m) | Sr | Southern Utah | Dazaifu, Fukuoka, Japan |
| G | 4 | Brynn Lusby | 5 ft 10 in (1.78 m) | Fr | Panther Creek High School | Frisco, Texas |
| G | 5 | Myra Bell | 5 ft 10 in (1.78 m) | GS | Taft High School | San Antonio, Texas |
| G | 10 | Eryn McKinzie | 5 ft 10 in (1.78 m) | Fr | Brewer High School | Fort Worth, Texas |
| G | 12 | Izzy Majarucon | 5 ft 6 in (1.68 m) | Fr | Dream City High School | Phoenix, Arizona |
| F | 14 | Brenna Perez | 6 ft 0 in (1.83 m) | GS | Veterans Memorial High School | San Antonio, Texas |
| F | 21 | Mallory McQuietor | 6 ft 1 in (1.85 m) | So | Keller High School | Keller, Texas |
| G | 22 | Breelyn Sanborn | 5 ft 11 in (1.8 m) | Jr | St. Pius X High School | Spring, Texas |
| G | 23 | Deja Lumsden | 5 ft 10 in (1.78 m) | Jr | Weatherford College | Fort Worth, Texas |
| G | 24 | Destiny Whitaker | 5 ft 10 in (1.78 m) | So | Mansfield Summit High School | Dallas, Texas |
| G | 32 | Jorja Elliott | 5 ft 11 in (1.8 m) | Jr | Lake Dallas High School | Hickory Creek, Texas |
| F | 34 | Grace Okih | 6 ft 2 in (1.88 m) | Jr | Jacksonville College | Lagos, Nigeria |
| F | 35 | Raimi McCrary | 6 ft 0 in (1.83 m) | So | Allen High School | Allen, Texas |
| G | 55 | Madison Cockrell | 5 ft 4 in (1.63 m) | Jr | UTSA | Dallas, Texas |

Head coach

- Jeff Dow (Oregon)

Assistant coach(es)

- Amber Cunningham (Rice)
- Rachel Baity (Our Lady of the Lake)
- Steven Oliver (Geneva)
- Wade Whaley (West Texas A&M)

Legend

- (C) Team captain
- (S) Suspended
- (I) Ineligible
- (W) Walk-on
- Injured
- Current redshirt

Roster
Last update: March 2, 2025

== Postseason ==
=== NCAA Division I ===
The Cardinals have made one appearance in the NCAA Division I women's basketball tournament. They have a combined record of 0–1.

| Year | Seed | Round | Opponent | Result |
|---|---|---|---|---|
| 2022 | #16 | First Four | #16 Howard | L 51–55 |

=== NCAA Division II ===
The Cardinals made one appearance in the NCAA Division II women's basketball tournament. They had a combined record of 0–1.

| Year | Round | Opponent | Result |
|---|---|---|---|
| 2009 | First Round | Washburn | L, 38–57 |

=== NAIA Division I ===
The Cardinals made two appearances in the NAIA Division I women's basketball tournament, with a combined record of 1–2.

| Year | Seed | Round | Opponent | Result |
|---|---|---|---|---|
| 1998 | NR | First Round | #5 Phillips | L, 55–65 |
| 1999 | #14 | First Round; Second Round | NR Rio Grande #3 Union (TN) | W, 86–72; L, 86–108 |
