= Townsley Law Arena =

Indoor arena at McNeese State University

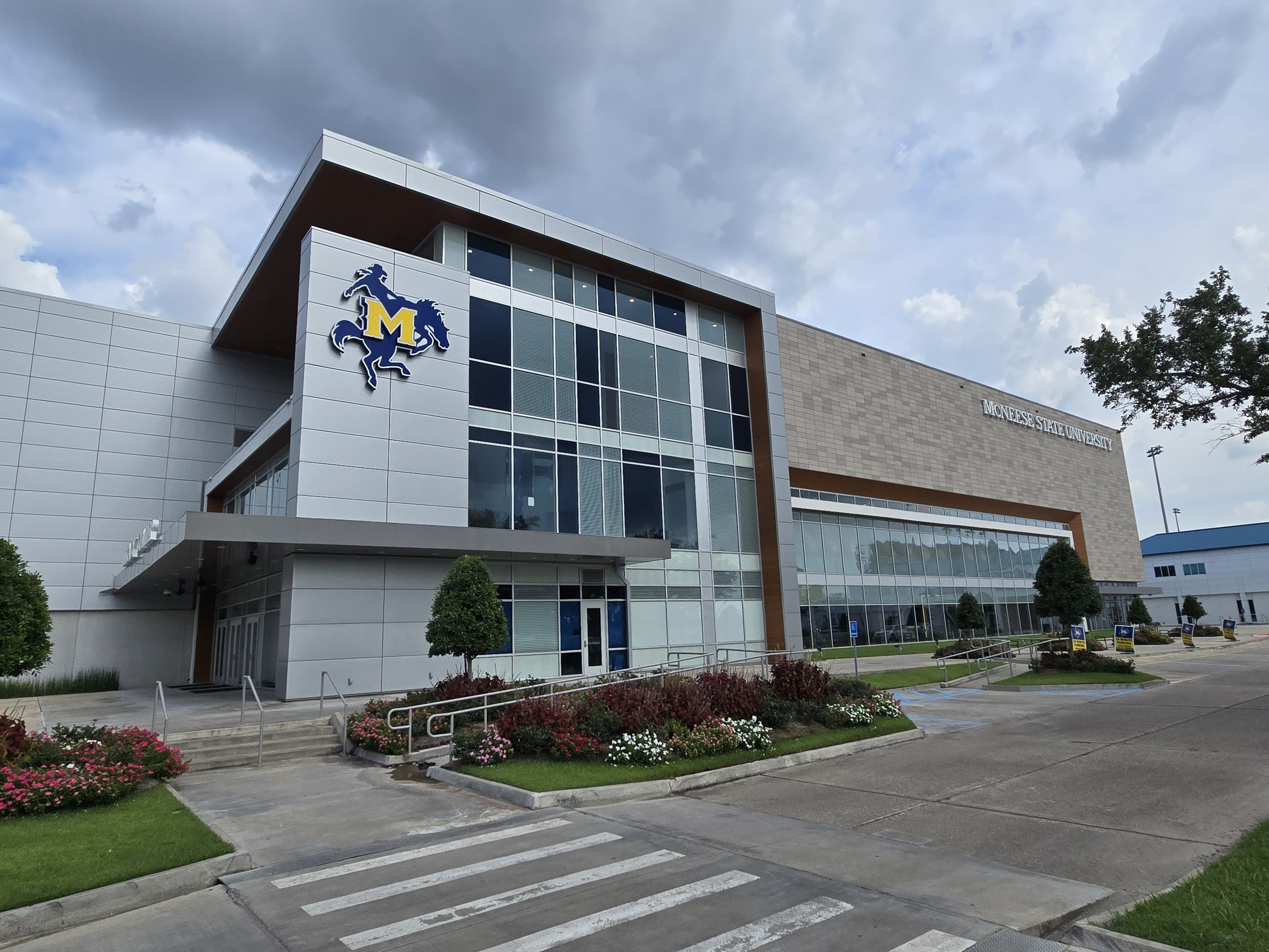
- Exterior of Townsley Law Arena

- Location in Louisiana Location in the United States
- Former names: Health and Human Performance Education Complex (2018–2021); The Legacy Center (2021–2025)
- Location: E McNeese Street; Lake Charles, Louisiana 70607
- Coordinates: 30°10′31.8″N 93°12′34.2″W
- Owner: McNeese State University
- Operator: McNeese State University
- Capacity: Basketball: 3,800; Concert: 4,200; Volleyball: 600

Construction
- Built: 2017
- Opened: 2018
- Cost: $45 million
- Architects: Crawford Architects; Randy M. Goodloe Architect
- General contractors: Alfred Palma, LLC

Tenants
- McNeese Cowboys basketball (2018-present); McNeese Cowgirls basketball (2018-present); McNeese Cowgirls volleyball (2018-present); Southland Conference basketball tournaments (2023-present) (NCAA)

Townsley Law Arena, originally known as the Health and Human Performance Education Complex (or H&HP Complex) and formerly as The Legacy Center, is a multi-purpose arena in Lake Charles, Louisiana, on the campus of McNeese State University across the street from the Jack V. Doland Athletic Complex. The 145,000-square-foot (13,500 m^{2}) facility includes six classrooms, 12 faculty offices, a lab, a sports training center, an arena seating around 4,200 for basketball and other events as well as a volleyball court with seating for 600. Crawford Architects and Randy M Goodloe AIA, APAC were the project architectural firms, and the general contractor was Alfred Palma, LLC.

== Renaming ==
On August 4, 2021, McNeese announced that the arena had been renamed The Legacy Center after Lake Charles couple David and Kimberly Griffin pledged $2.5 million in donations over 10 years. The "Legacy" name reflects the Griffins' ownership of local retailer Legacy Jewelers, as well as the name of their farm, Legacy Fields.

On October 7, 2025, McNeese announced that the arena had been renamed Townsley Law Arena, following a $4.5 million over 15 years naming rights agreement with Townsley Law Firm, the largest naming rights deal in Southland Conference history.

== Gallery ==
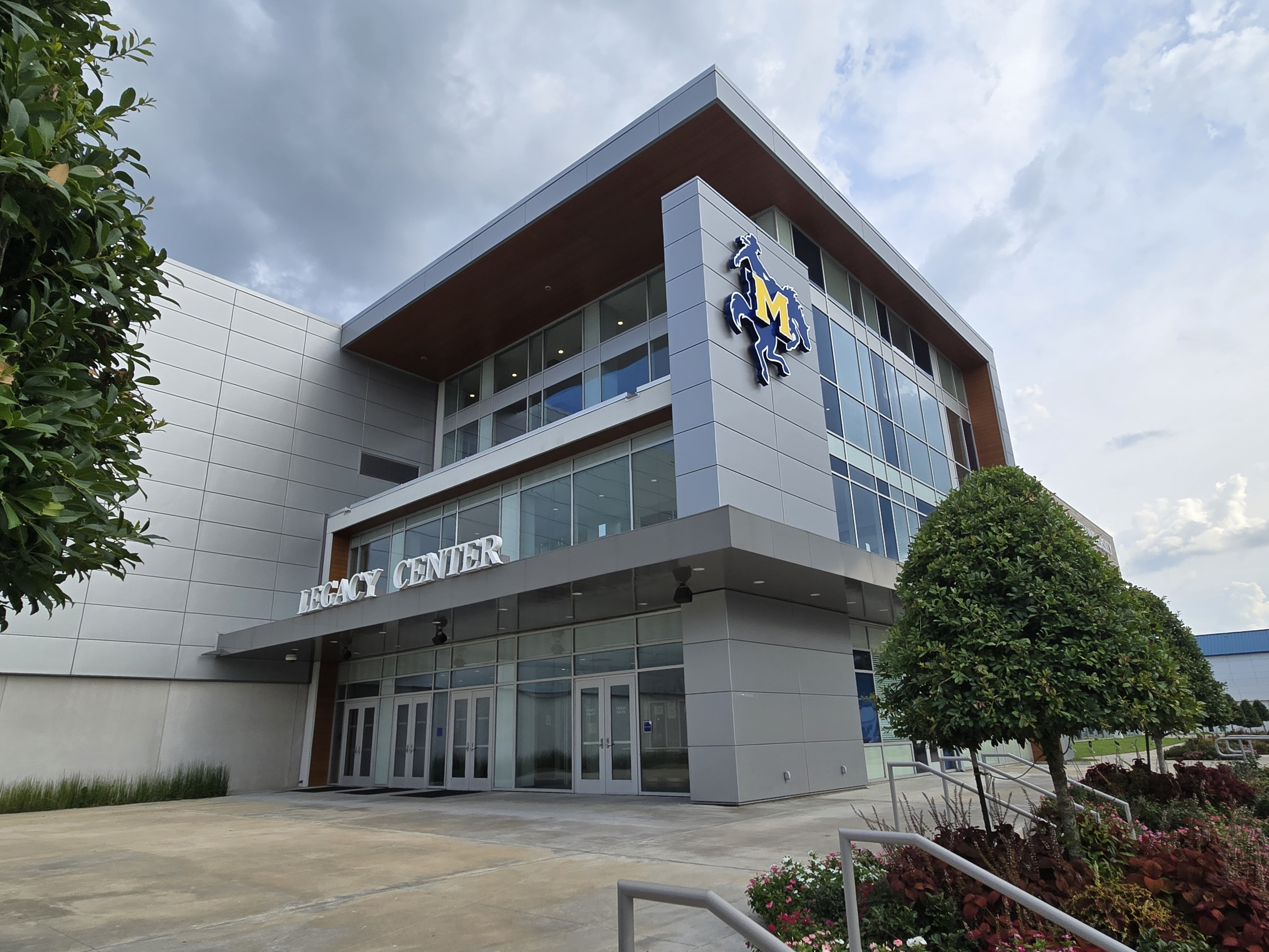
Townsley Law Arena main entrance

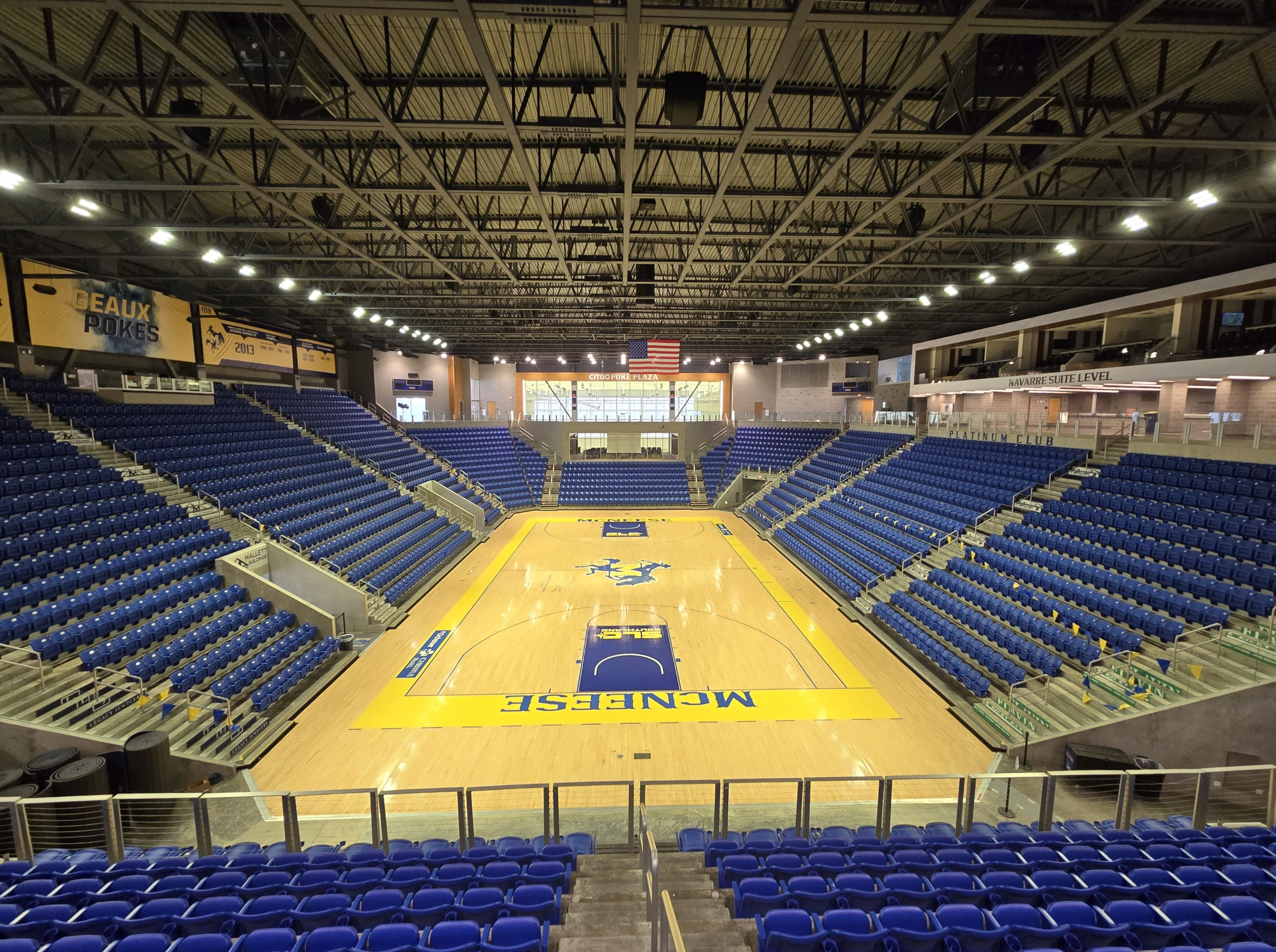
Joe Dumars Court at the Townsley Law Arena

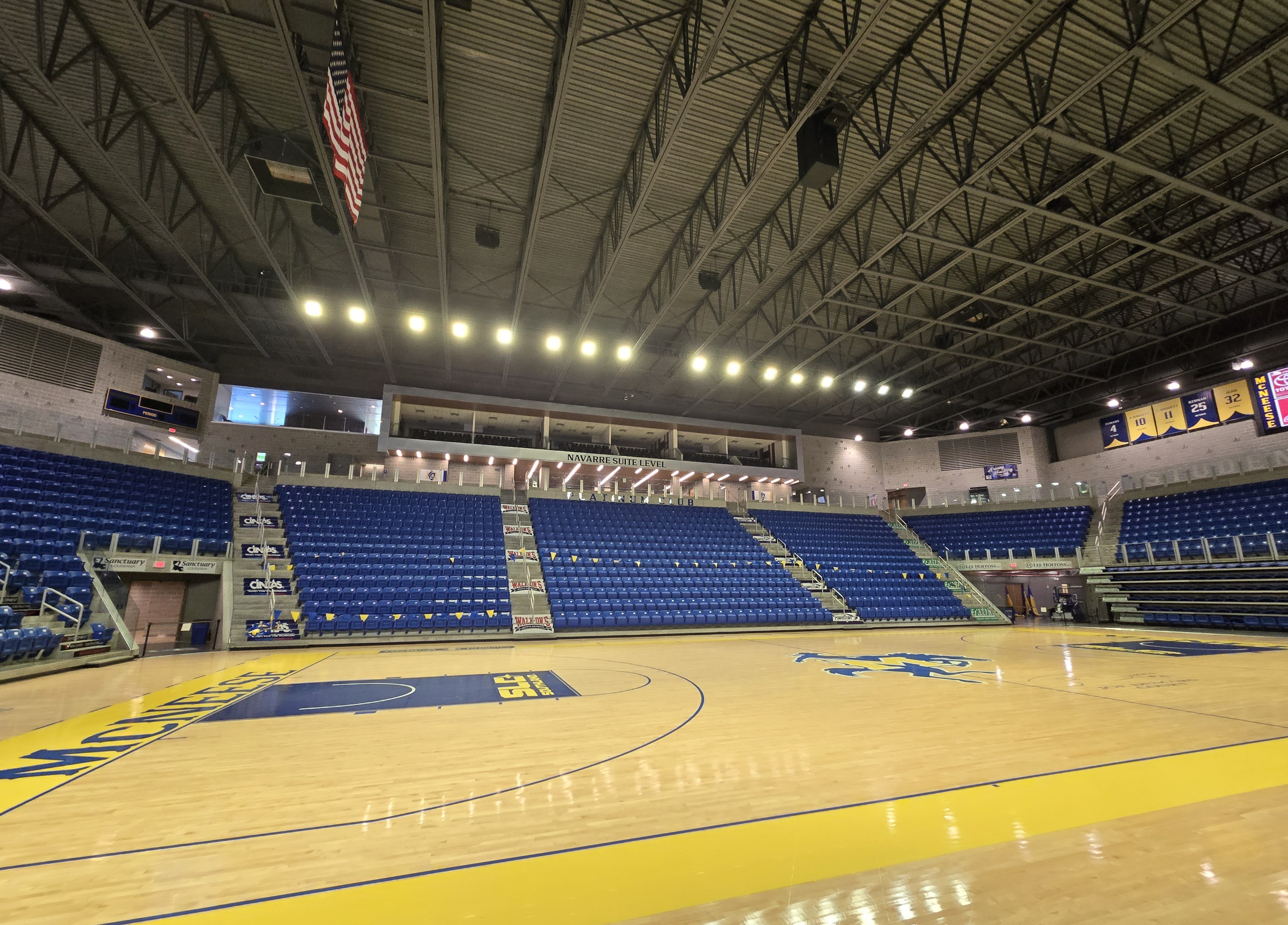
Stands at the Townsley Law Arena

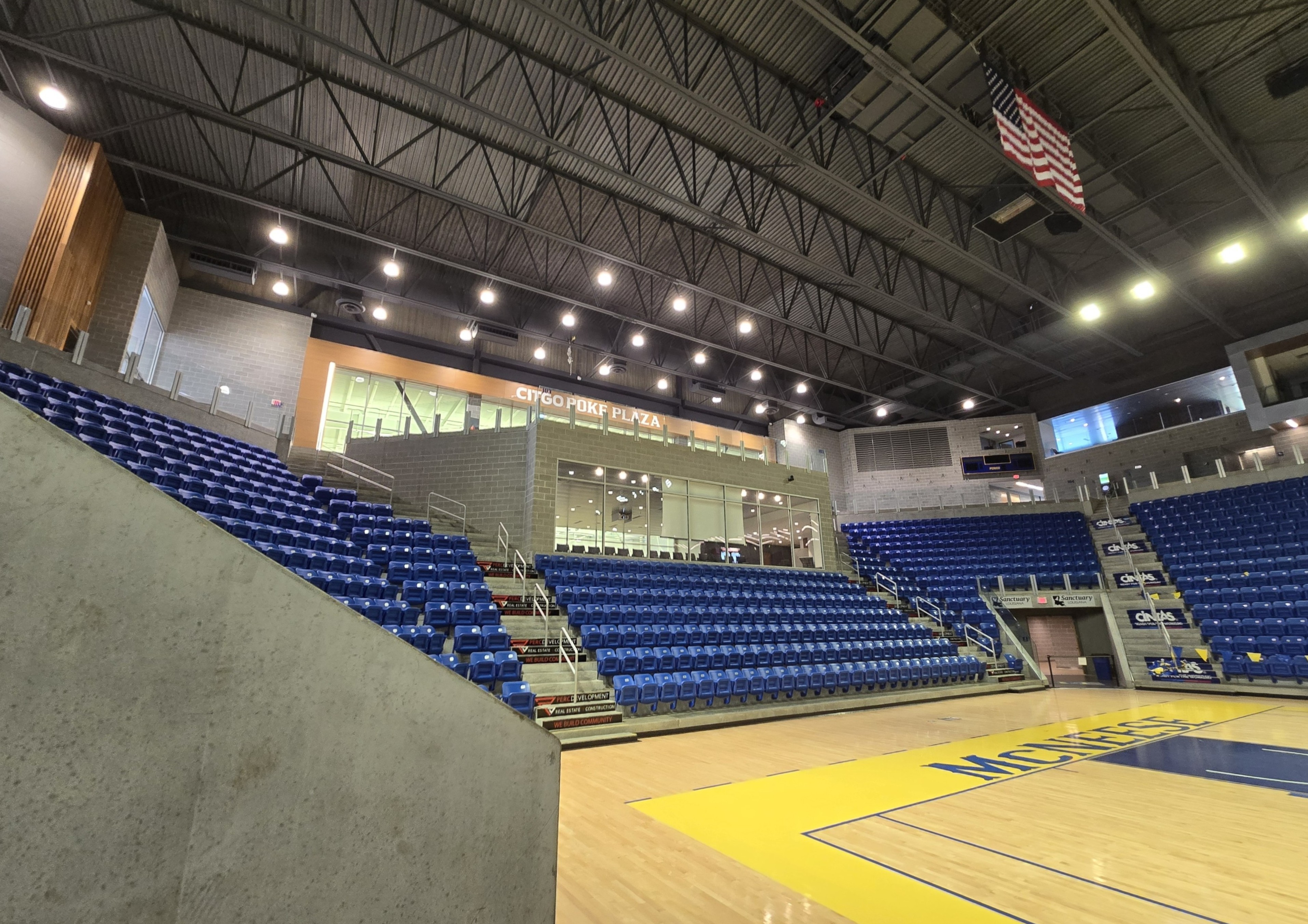
Pokes Plaza at the Townsley Law Arena

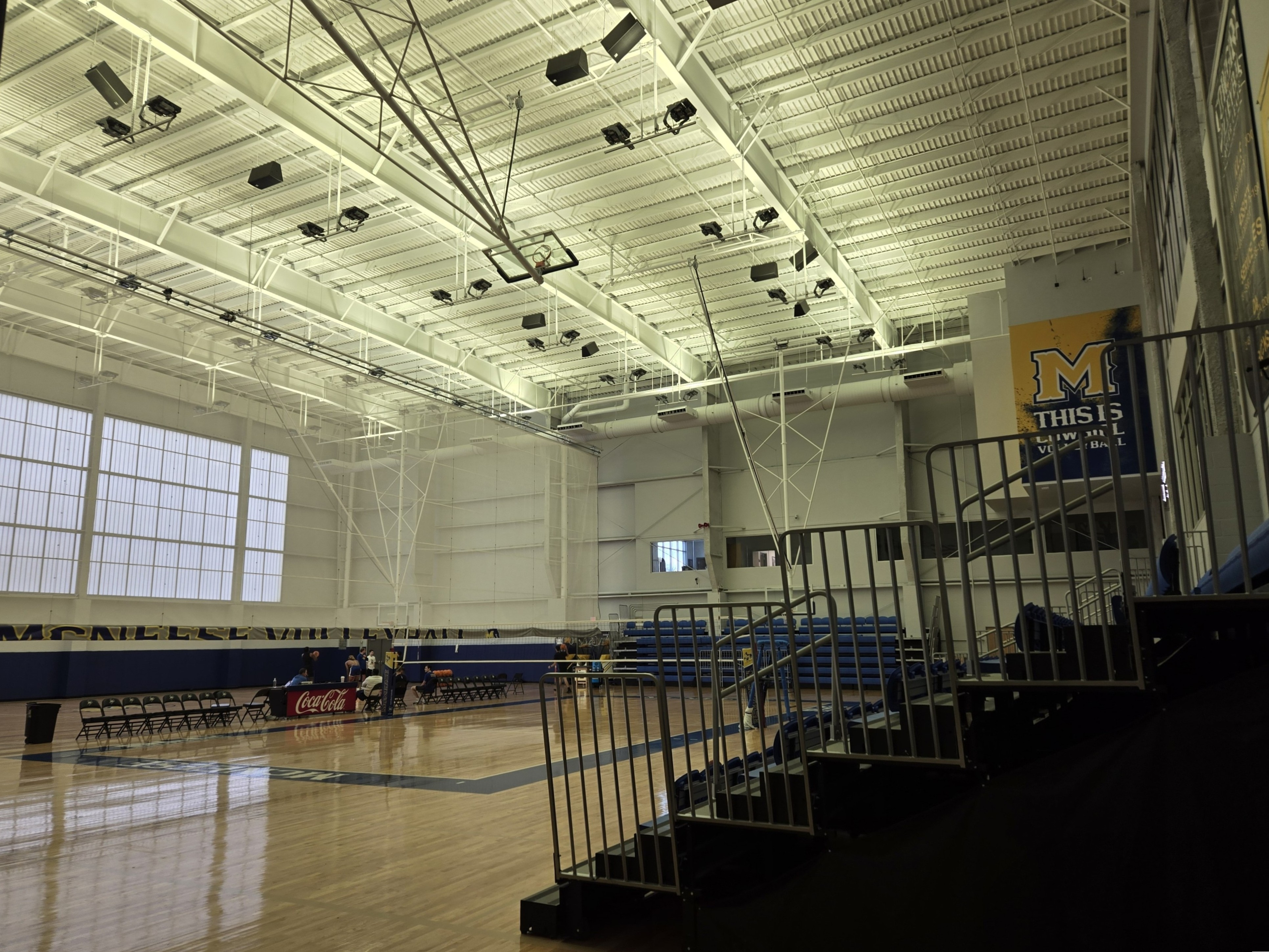
Townsley Law Arena volleyball arena

== See also ==
- List of NCAA Division I basketball arenas
