= 2018–19 Houston Baptist Huskies women's basketball team =

Intercollegiate basketball season

2018–19 Houston Baptist Huskies women's basketball
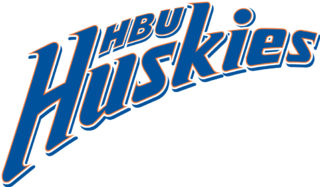
- Conference: Southland Conference
- Record: 9–19 (4–14 Southland)
- Head coach: Donna Finnie (6th season)
- Assistant coaches: Lauren Tippert; Becca Allison; Precious Ivy
- Home arena: Sharp Gymnasium (Capacity: 1,000)

2018–19 Southland Conference women's basketball standings
	Conf.				Overall
Team	W		L	PCT	W		L	PCT
Lamar	17	–	1	.944	24	–	7	.774
Stephen F. Austin	16	–	2	.889	25	–	7	.781
Nicholls	14	–	4	.778	20	–	12	.625
Abilene Christian †	13	–	5	.722	23	–	10	.697
Sam Houston State	11	–	7	.611	16	–	13	.552
Texas A&M–CC	8	–	10	.444	17	–	16	.515
New Orleans	8	–	10	.444	12	–	16	.429
Central Arkansas	6	–	12	.333	12	–	18	.400
Northwestern State	6	–	12	.333	11	–	18	.379
McNeese State	5	–	13	.278	7	–	22	.241
Incarnate Word	5	–	13	.278	5	–	24	.172
Houston Baptist	4	–	14	.222	9	–	19	.321
Southeastern Louisiana	4	–	14	.222	9	–	20	.310
† 2019 Southland tournament winner Rankings from AP poll

The 2018–19 Houston Baptist Huskies women's basketball team represented Houston Baptist University in the 2018–19 college basketball season. The Huskies, led by sixth-year head coach Donna Finnie, played their home games at the Sharp Gymnasium and were members of the Southland Conference. They finished the season 8–20, 3–15 in Southland play to finish in a tie for last place. They failed to qualify for the Southland women's tournament.

== Previous season ==
The Huskies finished the 2017–18 season with an overall record of 10–18 and 6–12 in Southland play to finish in tenth place. They failed to qualify for the Southland women's tournament.

== Roster ==
2018–19 Houston Baptist Huskies women's basketball team
Players
Coaches

Pos.	#	Name	Height	Year	Previous school	Hometown
G	0	Takara Wade	5 ft 4 in (1.63 m)	Jr	Desert Vista HS/Mesa CC	Goodyear, AZ
G	3	Shannon Jones	5 ft 10 in (1.78 m)	Jr	Crosby HS	Crosby, TX
G	5	Sophie Taylor	5 ft 9 in (1.75 m)	Jr	Westwood HS	Austin, TX
PG	10	Bria Johnson	5 ft 6 in (1.68 m)	Jr	Sunnyvale HS	Sunnyvale, TX
G	11	Matangiroa Flavell	5 ft 11 in (1.8 m)	Jr	Te Kura Kaupapa Maori o Te Koutu	Rotorua, New Zealand
G	13	Megan Valdez-Crader	5 ft 5 in (1.65 m)	So	Johnson HS	San Antonio, TX
G	14	Amanda Johnson	6 ft 1 in (1.85 m)	Sr	Georgetown HS	Georgetown, TX
G	15	Julija Vujakovic	5 ft 9 in (1.75 m)	Fr	Lycee des Garcons du Luxembourg	Bereldange, Luxembourg
G	22	Sydney Carr	5 ft 8 in (1.73 m)	Jr	Crosby HS	Crosby, TX
F	23	Lauren Calver	6 ft 1 in (1.85 m)	Jr	Heathcote HS	Helensburgh, Australia
F	24	Taylor Kollmorgan	6 ft 0 in (1.83 m)	So	Second Baptist HS	Houston, TX
C	25	Natalia Gwarda	6 ft 3 in (1.91 m)	Sr	NLO PZKosz Lomianki; New Mexico JC	Aleksandrów, Poland
C	33	Marilyn Nzoiwu	6 ft 3 in (1.91 m)	Fr	Cedar Ridge HS	Round Rock, TX
C	45	Veronika Kirienko	6 ft 4 in (1.93 m)	Sr	School 168	Tashkent, Uzbekistan
C	55	Kennedy Collins	6 ft 1 in (1.85 m)	Sr	Cedar Park HS	Bastrop, TX

Head coach

- Donna Finnie (Heriot–Watt)

Assistant coach(es)

- Lauren Tippet (Sam Houston State)
- Becca Allison (Old Dominion)
- Precious Ivy (Houston)

Legend

- (C) Team captain
- (S) Suspended
- (I) Ineligible
- (W) Walk-on
- Injured
- Current redshirt

Roster
Last update: August 29, 2018

== Schedule and results ==
Date time, TV	Rank^{#}	Opponent^{#}	Result	Record	Site (attendance) city, state
Non-conference schedule
Nov 11, 2018*; 4:00 pm		McMurry	W 92–41	1–0	Sharp Gymnasium (513); Houston, TX
Nov 14, 2018*; 7:00 pm		Texas A&M International	W 81–48	2–0	Sharp Gymnasium (446); Houston, TX
Nov 17, 2018*; 2:00 pm, CSTYurview		at Wichita State	L 50–68	2–1	Charles Koch Arena (1,567); Wichita, KS
Nov 21, 2018*; 7:00 pm		Howard Payne	W 93–60	3–1	Sharp Gymnasium (254); Houston, TX
Nov 24, 2018*; 2:00 pm		at Texas Tech	L 76–82	3–2	United Supermarkets Arena (2,775); Lubbock, TX
Nov 27, 2018*; 7:00 pm		Southwest	W 100–77	4–2	Sharp Gymnasium (277); Houston, TX
Dec 5, 2018*; 12:00 pm		at North Texas	L 75–100	4–3	UNT Coliseum (2,351); Denton, TX
Dec 9, 2018*; 12:00 pm		at Oklahoma State	L 44–77	4–4	Gallagher-Iba Arena (1,659); Stillwater, OK
Dec 16, 2018*; 2:00 pm		Oral Roberts	L 56–74	4–5	Sharp Gymnasium (212); Houston, TX
Dec 19, 2019*; 12:00 pm		Louisiana–Monroe	W 68–60	5–5	Sharp Gymnasium (375); Houston, TX
Southland Conference schedule
Jan 2, 2019; 7:00 pm, ESPN+		at Lamar	L 50–63	5–6 (0–1)	Montagne Center (939); Beaumont, TX
Jan 5, 2019; 2:00 pm		New Orleans	W 83–74	6–6 (1–1)	Sharp Gymnasium (314); Houston, TX
Jan 12, 2019; 2:00 pm		at Nicholls	L 54–77	6–7 (1–2)	Stopher Gym (201); Thibodaux, LA
Jan 16, 2019; 7:00 pm		Abilene Christian	L 62–72	6–8 (1–3)	Sharp Gymnasium (325); Houston, TX
Jan 19, 2019; 2:00 pm		Sam Houston State	L 63–74	6–9 (1–4)	Sharp Gymnasium (427); Houston, TX
Jan 23, 2019; 7:00 pm		at Southeastern Louisiana	L 65–73	6–10 (1–5)	University Center (637); Hammond, LA
Jan 26, 2019; 1:00 pm, ESPN+		at McNeese State	L 71–81	6–11 (1–6)	H&HP Complex (2,124); Lake Charles, LA
Jan 30, 2019; 7:00 pm		Incarnate Word	W 60–59	7–11 (2–6)	Sharp Gymnasium (327); Houston, TX
Feb 2, 2019; 2:00 pm		Texas A&M–Corpus Christi	L 56–70	7–12 (2–7)	Sharp Gymnasium (490); Houston, TX
Feb 6, 2019; 7:00 pm, ESPN+		at Stephen F. Austin	L 53–65	7–13 (2–8)	William R. Johnson Coliseum (1,011); Nacogdoches, TX
Feb 13, 2019; 7:00 pm		Central Arkansas	L 58–77	7–14 (2–9)	Sharp Gymnasium (143); Houston, TX
Feb 16, 2019; 2:00 pm		Nicholls State	L 55–58	7–15 (2–10)	Sharp Gymnasium (509); Houston, TX
Feb 21, 2019; 6:30 pm		at Northwestern State	L 46–63	7–16 (2–11)	Prather Coliseum (690); Natchitoches, LA
Feb 23, 2019; 3:00 pm		at Sam Houston State	L 64–83	7–17 (2–12)	Bernard G. Johnson Coliseum (964); Huntsville, TX
Feb 27, 2019; 7:00 pm		Lamar	L 49–97	7–18 (2–13)	Sharp Gymnasium (319); Houston, TX
Mar 2, 2019; 2:00 pm		McNeese State	L 67–72	7–19 (2–14)	Sharp Gymnasium (421); Houston, TX
Mar 6, 2019; 2:30 pm		at Incarnate Word	W 67–52	8–19 (3–14)	McDermott Convocation Center (339); San Antonio, TX
Mar 9, 2019; 2:30 pm		at Texas A&M–Corpus Christi	W 74–56	9–19 (4–14)	Dugan Wellness Center (603); Corpus Christi, TX
*Non-conference game. ^{#}Rankings from AP Poll. (#) Tournament seedings in parentheses. All times are in Central.

== See also ==
- 2018–19 Houston Baptist Huskies men's basketball team
