= 2018–19 McNeese State Cowgirls basketball team =

Intercollegiate basketball season

2018–19 McNeese State Cowgirls basketball
- Conference: Southland Conference
- Record: 7–22 (5–13 Southland)
- Head coach: Kacie Cryer (3rd season)
- Assistant coaches: Edie Higgins; Patrece Carter; Brittany Bigott
- Home arena: Health and Human Performance Education Complex (Capacity: 4,200)

2018–19 Southland Conference women's basketball standings
| | Conf. | | | | Overall |
| Team | W | | L | PCT | W | | L | PCT |
|---|---|---|---|---|---|---|---|---|
| Lamar | 17 | – | 1 | .944 | 24 | – | 7 | .774 |
| Stephen F. Austin | 16 | – | 2 | .889 | 25 | – | 7 | .781 |
| Nicholls | 14 | – | 4 | .778 | 20 | – | 12 | .625 |
| Abilene Christian † | 13 | – | 5 | .722 | 23 | – | 10 | .697 |
| Sam Houston State | 11 | – | 7 | .611 | 16 | – | 13 | .552 |
| Texas A&M–CC | 8 | – | 10 | .444 | 17 | – | 16 | .515 |
| New Orleans | 8 | – | 10 | .444 | 12 | – | 16 | .429 |
| Central Arkansas | 6 | – | 12 | .333 | 12 | – | 18 | .400 |
| Northwestern State | 6 | – | 12 | .333 | 11 | – | 18 | .379 |
| McNeese State | 5 | – | 13 | .278 | 7 | – | 22 | .241 |
| Incarnate Word | 5 | – | 13 | .278 | 5 | – | 24 | .172 |
| Houston Baptist | 4 | – | 14 | .222 | 9 | – | 19 | .321 |
| Southeastern Louisiana | 4 | – | 14 | .222 | 9 | – | 20 | .310 |
† 2019 Southland tournament winner Rankings from AP poll

The 2018–19 McNeese State Cowgirls basketball team represented McNeese State University during the 2018–19 NCAA Division I women's basketball season. The Cowgirls, led by third-year head coach Kacie Cryer, played all their home games at the Health and Human Performance Education Complex in Lake Charles, Louisiana. They were members of the Southland Conference. They finished the season 7–22, 5–13 in Southland play, to finish in a tie for tenth place. They failed to qualify for the Southland women's tournament.

== Previous season ==
The Cowgirls finished the 2017–18 season with a 12–18 overall record and an 8–10 Southland Conference record to finish in eighth place. Their season ended with a loss to Texas A&M–Corpus Christi in the first round of the Southland women's tournament.

== Roster ==
2018–19 McNeese State Cowboys women's basketball team
Players
Coaches

| Pos. | # | Name | Height | Year | Previous school | Hometown |
|---|---|---|---|---|---|---|
| G | 1 | Reagan Bolton | 5 ft 8 in (1.73 m) | Jr | St. Thomas Aquinas HS | Hammond, LA |
| F | 2 | Bre'Ashlee Jones | 5 ft 7 in (1.7 m) | So | Jewel Sumner HS | Kentwood, LA |
| G | 4 | Rayah Haynes | 5 ft 6 in (1.68 m) | Fr | Zachary HS | Zachary, LA |
| G | 12 | Jahquell Robinson | 5 ft 4 in (1.63 m) | RS Fr | West Monroe HS | West Monroe, LA |
| C | 13 | Cynthia Rivas | 6 ft 2 in (1.88 m) | Sr | North Central Texas Academy | Guadalajara, Mexico |
| G | 15 | Jamara Levy | 5 ft 5 in (1.65 m) | Fr | Lake Arthur HS | Lake Arthur, LA |
| G | 20 | Kaylee Hughes | 5 ft 11 in (1.8 m) | Fr | Holden HS | Holden, LA |
| G | 21 | Maddisen Martin | 5 ft 8 in (1.73 m) | Fr | Fairview HS | Mittie, LA |
| G | 22 | Callie Maddox | 6 ft 0 in (1.83 m) | RS Fr | Fairview HS | Grant, LA |
| F | 24 | Divine Tanks | 6 ft 1 in (1.85 m) | Fr | Barbe HS | Lake Charles, LA |
| G | 25 | Sky Jasper | 5 ft 11 in (1.8 m) | Jr | Coffeeville CC | Houma, LA |
| F | 30 | Damilola Balogun | 6 ft 0 in (1.83 m) | Jr | Bossier Parish CC | Lagos, Nigeria |
| | 40 | Maia Robinson | 6 ft 2 in (1.88 m) | Fr | Denham Springs HS | Denham Springs, LA |

Head coach

- Kacie Cryer (LSU–Shreveport)

Assistant coach(es)

- Edie Higgins (LSU–Shreveport)
- Patrece Carter (Louisiana Christian)
- Brittany Bigott (St. Thomas (TX))

Legend

- (C) Team captain
- (S) Suspended
- (I) Ineligible
- (W) Walk-on
- Injured
- Current redshirt

Roster
Last update: March 8, 2025

== Schedule ==
| Date time, TV | Rank^{#} | Opponent^{#} | Result | Record | Site (attendance) city, state |
Non-conference regular season
| November 9, 2018*; 5:30 p.m. | | at Grambling State | L 51–75 | 0–1 | Fredrick C. Hobdy Assembly Center (465); Grambling, LA |
| November 11, 2018*; 2:00 p.m. | | Louisiana | L 59–70 | 0–2 | H&HP Complex (727); Lake Charles, LA |
| November 15, 2018*; 11:00 a.m., LHN | | at No. 11 Texas | L 40–96 | 0–3 | Frank Erwin Center (2,950); Austin, TX |
| November 18, 2018*; 2:00 p.m. | | at Louisiana–Monroe | L 60–69 | 0–4 | Fant–Ewing Coliseum (1,030); Monroe, LA |
| November 21, 2018*; 11:00 a.m. | | LSU–Alexandria | L 60–68 | 0–5 | H&HP Complex (1,528); Lake Charles, LA |
| November 25, 2018*; 2:00 p.m. | | at Rice | L 65–93 | 0–6 | Tudor Fieldhouse (380); Houston, TX |
| December 8, 2018*; 2:00 p.m. | | at UAB | L 48–91 | 0–7 | Bartow Arena (303); Birmingham, AL |
| December 11, 2018*; 11:00 a.m. | | at LSU | L 36–86 | 0–8 | Pete Maravich Assembly Center (6,528); Baton Rouge, LA |
| December 17, 2018*; 6:30 p.m. | | Southern–New Orleans | W 106–54 | 1–8 | H&HP Complex (578); Lake Charles, LA |
| December 19, 2018*; 6:30 p.m. | | Louisiana College | W 86–68 | 2–8 | H&HP Complex (1,555); Lake Charles, LA |
| December 29, 2018*; 1:00 p.m. | | Louisiana Tech | L 48–89 | 2–9 | H&HP Complex (1,651); Lake Charles, LA |
Southland regular season
| January 2, 2019; 6:30 p.m. | | Incarnate Word | L 66–68 | 2–10 (0–1) | H&HP Complex (1,639); Lake Charles, LA |
| January 5, 2019; 1:00 p.m. | | at Northwestern State | L 63–82 | 2–11 (0–2) | Prather Coliseum (1,034); Natchitoches, LA |
| January 9, 2019; 6:00 p.m. | | at Abilene Christian | L 52–109 | 2–12 (0–3) | Moody Coliseum (1,099); Abilene, TX |
| January 12, 2019; 2:00 p.m. | | at New Orleans | L 76–88 | 2–13 (0–4) | Lakefront Arena (221); New Orleans, LA |
| January 16, 2019; 6:30 p.m. | | at Nicholls | W 69–68 | 3–13 (1–4) | Stopher Gym (225); Thibodaux, LA |
| January 19, 2019; 1:00 p.m. | | Southeastern Louisiana | W 62–56 | 4–13 (2–4) | H&HP Complex (637); Lake Charles, LA |
| January 26, 2019; 1:00 p.m., ESPN+ | | Houston Baptist | W 81–71 | 5–13 (3–4) | H&HP Complex (2,124); Lake Charles, LA |
| February 2, 2019; 1:00 p.m. | | Lamar | L 62–64 | 5–14 (3–5) | H&HP Complex (2,201); Lake Charles, LA |
| February 6, 2019; 6:30 p.m. | | Sam Houston State | L 80–93 | 5–15 (3–6) | H&HP Complex (1,784); Lake Charles, LA |
| February 9, 2019; 1:00 p.m. | | Northwestern State | L 73–89 | 5–16 (3–7) | H&HP Complex (2,373); Lake Charles, LA |
| February 13, 2019; 6:30 p.m. | | Stephen F. Austin | L 48–97 | 5–17 (3–8) | H&HP Complex (1,567); Lake Charles, LA |
| February 16, 2019; 1:00 p.m. | | at Southeastern Louisiana | W 75–70 | 6–17 (4–8) | University Center (555); Hammond, LA |
| February 20, 2019; 7:00 p.m. | | at Central Arkansas | L 45–76 | 6–18 (4–9) | Farris Center (328); Conway, AR |
| February 23, 2019; 1:00 p.m. | | New Orleans | L 60–64 | 6–19 (4–10) | H&HP Complex (1,905); Lake Charles, LA |
| February 27, 2019; 6:30 p.m. | | Nicholls | L 55–78 | 6–20 (4–11) | H&HP Complex (1,736); Lake Charles, LA |
| March 2, 2019; 2:00 p.m. | | at Houston Baptist | W 72–67 | 7–20 (5–11) | Sharp Gymnasium (421); Houston, TX |
| March 6, 2019; 7:00 p.m. | | at Texas A&M–Corpus Christi | L 51–62 | 7–21 (5–12) | Dugan Wellness Center (633); Corpus Christi, TX |
| March 9, 2019; 2:00 p.m., ESPN+ | | at Lamar | L 68–81 | 7–22 (5–13) | Montagne Center (5,218); Beaumont, TX |
*Non-conference game. ^{#}Rankings from AP Poll. (#) Tournament seedings in parentheses. All times are in Central Time.

== See also ==
- 2018–19 McNeese State Cowboys basketball team
