= 2019 Southland Conference women's basketball tournament =

- Classification: Division I
- Season: 2018–19
- Teams: 8
- Site: Merrell Center; Katy, Texas
- Champions: Abilene Christian (1st title)
- Winning coach: Julie Goodenough (1st title)
- MVP: Breanna Wright (Abilene Christian)
- Television: ESPN+/CBSSN

2018–19 Southland Conference women's basketball standings
	Conf.				Overall
Team	W		L	PCT	W		L	PCT
Lamar	17	–	1	.944	24	–	7	.774
Stephen F. Austin	16	–	2	.889	25	–	7	.781
Nicholls	14	–	4	.778	20	–	12	.625
Abilene Christian †	13	–	5	.722	23	–	10	.697
Sam Houston State	11	–	7	.611	16	–	13	.552
Texas A&M–CC	8	–	10	.444	17	–	16	.515
New Orleans	8	–	10	.444	12	–	16	.429
Central Arkansas	6	–	12	.333	12	–	18	.400
Northwestern State	6	–	12	.333	11	–	18	.379
McNeese State	5	–	13	.278	7	–	22	.241
Incarnate Word	5	–	13	.278	5	–	24	.172
Houston Baptist	4	–	14	.222	9	–	19	.321
Southeastern Louisiana	4	–	14	.222	9	–	20	.310
† 2019 Southland tournament winner Rankings from AP poll

The 2019 Southland Conference women's basketball tournament, a part of the 2018–19 NCAA Division I women's basketball season, took place March 14–17, 2019 at the Merrell Center in Katy, Texas. The winner of the tournament, Abilene Christian received the Southland Conference's automatic bid to the 2019 NCAA tournament. Breanna Wright was named the tournament's Most Valuable Player.

== Seeds and regular season standings ==
Only the Top 8 teams advanced to the Southland Conference tournament. This chart shows all the teams records and standings and explains why teams advanced to the conference tourney or finished in certain tiebreaking positions.

2018 Southland Conference women's basketball tournament seeds
Seed	School	Conference record	Overall record (end of regular season)	Tiebreaker
1.	‡*Lamar	17–1	24–5	
2.	*Stephen F. Austin	16–2	25–5	
3.	#Nicholls	14–4	20–10	
4.	#Abilene Christian	13–5	20–9	
5.	Sam Houston State	11–7	16–12	
6.	Texas A&M–Corpus Christi	8–10	14–15	1–1 vs UNO; 1–1 vs common opponent UIW; 1–0 vs SFA
7.	New Orleans	8–10	12–15	1–1 vs TAMUCC; 1–1 vs UIW; 0–1 vs SFA
8.	Central Arkansas	6–12	11–17	
	‡ – Southland Conference regular season champions. * – Receive a first-round and second-round bye in the conference tournament. # – Receive a first-round bye in the conference tournament. Overall record are as of the end of the regular season.			

== Schedule ==
Session	Game	Time*	Matchup^{#}	Score	Television
First round – Thursday, March 14
1	1	11:00 am	#5 Sam Houston State vs. #8 Central Arkansas	71–76	ESPN+
1	2	1:30 pm	#6 TAMU–CC vs. #7 New Orleans	69–47	ESPN+
Quarterfinals – Friday, March 15
2	3	11:00 am	#4 Abilene Christian vs. #8 Central Arkansas	82–54	ESPN+
2	4	1:30 pm	#3 Nicholls vs. #6 TAMU–CC	56–69	ESPN+
Semifinals – Saturday, March 16
3	5	1:00 pm	#1 Lamar vs. #4 Abilene Christian	79–88	ESPN+
3	6	3:30 pm	#2 Stephen F. Austin vs. #6 TAMU–CC	56–58	ESPN+
Championship – Sunday, March 17
4	7	1:00 pm	#4 Abilene Christian vs. #6 TAMU–CC	69–68	CBSSN
*Game times in CST. #-Rankings denote tournament seeding.

== Bracket ==
First round Thursday, March 14; ESPN+
5	Sam Houston State	71
8	Central Arkansas	76
7	New Orleans	47
6	Texas A&M–Corpus Christi	69

Quarterfinals; Friday, March 15; ESPN+
4	Abilene Christian	82
8	Central Arkansas	54
3	Nicholls	56
6	Texas A&M CC	69

Semifinals; Saturday, March 16; ESPN+
1	Lamar	79
4	Abilene Christian	88
2	Stephen F. Austin	56
6	Texas A&M CC	58

Championship Game; Sunday, March 17; CBSSN
4	Abilene Christian	69
6	Texas A&M CC	68

== Awards and honors ==
Tournament MVP: Breanna Wright (Abilene Christian)
All-Tournament Team:

- Breanna Wright (Abilene Christian)
- Sara Williamson (Abilene Christian)
- Alexes Bryant (Texas A&M–Corpus Christi)
- Dalesia Booth (Texas A&M–Corpus Christi)
- Moe Kinard (Lamar)

== See also ==
- 2019 Southland Conference men's basketball tournament
- Southland Conference women's basketball tournament
