= Ayla Guzzardo =

American basketball player and coach

Current position
- Title: Head coach
- Team: Georgia
- Conference: SEC
- Record: 5–1 (.833)

Playing career
- 2006–2008: Shelton State CC
- 2008–2010: Akron

Coaching career (HC unless noted)
- 2010–2014: Akron (assistant)
- 2014–2015: Saint Thomas Aquinas HS (assistant)
- 2016–2017: Southeastern Louisiana (assistant)
- 2017–2025: Southeastern Louisiana
- 2025–2026: McNeese
- 2026–present: Georgia

Head coaching record
- Overall: 156–112 (.582)

Accomplishments and honors

Championships
- 3× Southland regular season (2023, 2025, 2026); 1× Southland tournament (2023)

Awards
- 3× Southland Coach of the Year (2023, 2025, 2026)

Ayla Guzzardo is an American basketball coach and former player. She is currently the head coach of the Georgia Lady Bulldogs basketball team.

== Career ==
Guzzardo played college basketball at Shelton State Community College and Akron. She began her coaching career in 2010, serving as an assistant coach at Akron. After four seasons at Akron, Guzzardo served as an assistant coach at her high school alma mater, Saint Thomas Aquinas. In 2016, she was hired as an assistant at Southeastern Louisiana. After one season as an assistant, Guzzardo was promoted to head coach. In 2023, she was named the Southland Conference Coach of the Year, as she led the Lady Lions to their first ever appearance in the NCAA tournament. In eight seasons as Southeastern Louisiana's head coach, Guzzardo compiled a 122–105 overall record. On March 24, 2025, she was named the next head coach at McNeese. In her first season as head coach of the Cowgirls, the team set a program record for overall wins with a 29–6 record and won the Southland regular-season title.

On April 5, 2026, Guzzardo was named the next head coach at Georgia, replacing Katie Abrahamson-Henderson.

== Head coaching record ==
Record table
Season	Team	Overall	Conference	Standing	Postseason
Southeastern Louisiana (Southland Conference) (2017–2025)
2017–18	Southeastern Louisiana	8–21	7–11	9th	
2018–19	Southeastern Louisiana	9–20	4–14	13th	
2019–20	Southeastern Louisiana	12–17	9–11	8th	
2020–21	Southeastern Louisiana	11–8	10–5	2nd	
2021–22	Southeastern Louisiana	16–11	10–4	3rd	
2022–23	Southeastern Louisiana	27–6	19–5	1st	NCAA First Round
2023–24	Southeastern Louisiana	19–12	14–4	T–2nd	
2024–25	Southeastern Louisiana	26–6	19–1	1st	WNIT First Round
Southeastern Louisiana:		122–105 (.537)	87–54 (.617)		
McNeese (Southland Conference) (2025–2026)
2025–26	McNeese	29–6	21–1	1st	WNIT Second Round
McNeese:		29–6 (.829)	21–1 (.955)		
Georgia (Southeastern Conference) (2026–present)
2026–27	Georgia	5–1	0–0		
Georgia:		5–1 (.833)	0–0 (–)		
Total:		156–112 (.582)			
National champion Postseason invitational champion Conference regular season champion Conference regular season and conference tournament champion Division regular season champion Division regular season and conference tournament champion Conference tournament champion
