= 2018–19 Texas A&M–Corpus Christi Islanders women's basketball team =

Intercollegiate basketball season

2018–19 Texas A&M–Corpus Christi Islanders women's basketball
- Conference: Southland Conference
- Record: 17–16 (8–10 Southland)
- Head coach: Royce Chadwick (6th season)
- Assistant coaches: Roxanne White; Darren Brunson; Sherrie Tucker
- Home arena: American Bank Center; Dugan Wellness Center

2018–19 Southland Conference women's basketball standings
	Conf.				Overall
Team	W		L	PCT	W		L	PCT
Lamar	17	–	1	.944	24	–	7	.774
Stephen F. Austin	16	–	2	.889	25	–	7	.781
Nicholls	14	–	4	.778	20	–	12	.625
Abilene Christian †	13	–	5	.722	23	–	10	.697
Sam Houston State	11	–	7	.611	16	–	13	.552
Texas A&M–CC	8	–	10	.444	17	–	16	.515
New Orleans	8	–	10	.444	12	–	16	.429
Central Arkansas	6	–	12	.333	12	–	18	.400
Northwestern State	6	–	12	.333	11	–	18	.379
McNeese State	5	–	13	.278	7	–	22	.241
Incarnate Word	5	–	13	.278	5	–	24	.172
Houston Baptist	4	–	14	.222	9	–	19	.321
Southeastern Louisiana	4	–	14	.222	9	–	20	.310
† 2019 Southland tournament winner Rankings from AP poll

The 2018–19 Texas A&M–Corpus Christi Islanders women's basketball team represented Texas A&M University–Corpus Christi in the 2018–19 NCAA Division I women's basketball season. The Islanders were led by seventh-year head coach Royce Chadwick, and played their home games at the American Bank Center and the Dugan Wellness Center, in Corpus Christi, Texas, as members of the Southland Conference. They finished the season 17–16 overall, 8–10 in Southland play, to finish in a tie for sixth place. As the No. 6 seed in the Southland women's tournament, they defeated New Orleans in the first round, Nicholls in the quarterfinals, Stephen F. Austin in the semifinals, before losing a close game to No. 4 seed Abilene Christian, 68–69, in the championship game.

== Previous season ==
The Islanders finished the 2017–18 season 19–12, 11–7 in Southland play, to finish in a three-way tie for fourth place. They advanced to the semifinals of the Southland women's tournament where they lost to Nicholls State.

== Media ==
Video streaming of all non-televised home games and audio for all road games was made available at GoIslanders.com.

== Roster ==
2018–19 Texas A&M–Corpus Christi Islanders women's basketball team
Players
Coaches

Pos.	#	Name	Height	Year	Previous school	Hometown
F	1	Giana Wright	5 ft 11 in (1.8 m)	So	Castro Valley HS	Castro Valley, CA
F	2	Alexes Bryant	6 ft 3 in (1.91 m)	Jr	New Mexico Junior College	Cibolo, TX
G	3	Torrionna Nesbitt	5 ft 8 in (1.73 m)	Fr	Steele HS	Cibolo, TX
G	4	Heaven Thompson	5 ft 6 in (1.68 m)	So	Bolton HS	Memphis, TN
F	5	Uri Jolivette	5 ft 10 in (1.78 m)	Sr	New Iberia Central HS	New Iberia, LA
G	10	Brianna Jackson	5 ft 6 in (1.68 m)	Sr	Northside HS; Independence College	Fort Smith, AR
G	11	Lajaneira Robinson	5 ft 7 in (1.7 m)	Jr	Odessa JC	Houston, TX
G	12	Dae Dae Evans	5 ft 7 in (1.7 m)	Jr	Bellaire HS	Bellaire, TX
G	15	Brittany Mbamalu	5 ft 8 in (1.73 m)	RS Sr	Dulles HS	Houston, TX
G	20	Makinna Serrata	6 ft 0 in (1.83 m)	RS Fr	McMullen Counts ISD	Tilden, TX
G	21	Emma Young	5 ft 10 in (1.78 m)	Jr	East Jessamine HS	Nicholasville, KY
G	22	Dalesia Booth	5 ft 9 in (1.75 m)	Jr	Cole HS	San Antonio, TX
G	23	Laderica Paul	5 ft 8 in (1.73 m)	Sr	Skyline HS; UMKC	Dallas, TX
G	24	Tasia Foman	5 ft 8 in (1.73 m)	Sr	Duncanville HS; Texas	Duncanville, TX
F	25	Melissa Lockridge	6 ft 0 in (1.83 m)	Fr		San Antonio, TX
G	30	Sydney-Anne Cotrell	5 ft 4 in (1.63 m)	RS Jr	William B. Travis HS	Sugar Land, TX
F	33	Arhianna Sims-Jackson	6 ft 5 in (1.96 m)	RS Jr	Hill College	Arlington, TX
F	34	Tiara Matthews	5 ft 11 in (1.8 m)	Jr	Fort Bend Kemper HS	Sugar Land, TX

Head coach

- Royce Chadwick (Southwestern Oklahoma State)

Assistant coach(es)

- Roxanne White (Stephen F. Austin)
- Darren Brunson (St. Mary's (TX))
- Sherrie Tucker (Coppin State)

Legend

- (C) Team captain
- (S) Suspended
- (I) Ineligible
- (W) Walk-on
- Injured
- Current redshirt

Roster
Last update: October 9, 2024

== Schedule and results ==
Date time, TV	Rank^{#}	Opponent^{#}	Result	Record	Site (attendance) city, state
Non-conference regular season
November 6, 2018*; 7:00 p.m.		St. Thomas	W 78–40	1–0	American Bank Center (587); Corpus Christi, TX
November 12, 2018*; 7:00 p.m.		at Texas–Rio Grande Valley; South Texas Showdown	W 59–49	2–0	UTRGV Fieldhouse (418); Edinburg, TX
November 20, 2018*; 7:00 p.m.		at Texas Tech	L 61–78	2–1	United Supermarkets Arena (2,349); Lubbock, TX
November 26, 2018*; 7:00 p.m.		Texas State	L 53–60	2–2	Dugan Wellness Center (609); Corpus Christi, TX
November 30, 2018*; 4:30 p.m.		vs. Louisiana; UTRGV Fall Classic	W 64–63	3–2	UTRGV Fieldhouse (113); Edinburg, TX
December 1, 2019*; 4:30 p.m.		vs. Prairie View A&M; UTRGV Fall Classic	L 59–67	3–3	UTRGV Fieldhouse (111); Edinburg, TX
December 4, 2018*; 7:00 p.m.		Texas–Rio Grande Valley; South Texas Showdown	L 57–70	3–4	American Bank Center (589); Corpus Christi, TX
December 8, 2018*; 2:00 p.m.		Texas A&M International	W 84–36	4–4	Dugan Wellness Center (611); Corpus Christi, TX
December 14, 2018*; 7:00 p.m.		Schreiner University	W 64–34	5–4	Dugan Wellness Center (521); Corpus Christi, TX
December 18, 2018*; 5:30 p.m., KDF		New Mexico State	L 65–67	5–5	American Bank Center (530); Corpus Christi, TX
December 20, 2018*; 5:30 p.m., KDF		Texas Lutheran	W 73–49	6–5	American Bank Center (589); Corpus Christi, TX
Southland regular season
December 31, 2018; 1:00 p.m.		at Central Arkansas	W 73–65	7–5 (1–0)	Farris Center (295); Conway, AR
January 5, 2019; 2:00 p.m., ESPN3		at Lamar	L 58–76	7–6 (1–1)	Montagne Center (2,628); Beaumont, TX
January 9, 2019; 7:00 p.m.		Northwestern State	W 79–55	8–6 (2–1)	Dugan Wellness Center (513); Corpus Christi, TX
January 16, 2019; 7:00 p.m.		Sam Houston State	W 76–61	9–6 (3–1)	Dugan Wellness Center (641); Corpus Christi, TX
January 19, 2019; 2:30 p.m., ESPN3		New Orleans	W 57–51	10–6 (4–1)	American Bank Center (1,215); Corpus Christi, TX
January 23, 2019; 6:00 p.m.		at Nicholls	L 55–85	10–7 (4–2)	Stopher Gym (405); Thibodaux, LA
January 30, 2019; 7:00 p.m.		Abilene Christian	L 68–72	10–8 (4–3)	Dugan Wellness Center (658); Corpus Christi, TX
February 2, 2019; 2:00 p.m.		at Houston Baptist	W 70–56	11–8 (5–3)	Sharp Gymnasium (490); Houston, TX
February 6, 2019; 7:00 p.m.		at Southeastern Louisiana	L 45–56	11–9 (5–4)	University Center (529); Hammond, LA
February 9, 2019; 3:00 p.m., KRIS-TV		Incarnate Word	W 57–49	12–9 (6–4)	American Bank Center (811); Corpus Christi, TX
February 13, 2019; 6:30 p.m., ESPN+		at Sam Houston State	L 59–61	12–10 (6–5)	Bernard G. Johnson Coliseum (735); Huntsville, TX
February 16, 2019; 2:00 p.m.		at New Orleans	L 55–58	12–11 (6–6)	Lakefront Arena (363); New Orleans, LA
February 20, 2019; 7:00 p.m.		Stephen F. Austin	W 46–44	13–11 (7–6)	Dugan Wellness Center (501); Corpus Christi, TX
February 23, 2019; 1:00 p.m.		Lamar	L 47–72	13–12 (7–7)	Dugan Wellness Center (1,079); Corpus Christi, TX
February 27, 2019; 6:00 p.m., ESPN+		at Abilene Christian	L 55–72	13–13 (7–8)	Moody Coliseum (1,192); Abilene, TX
March 2, 2019; 1:00 p.m.		at Incarnate Word	L 72–77	13–14 (7–9)	McDermott Convocation Center (488); San Antonio, TX
March 6, 2019; 7:00 p.m.		McNeese	W 62–51	14–14 (8–9)	Dugan Wellness Center (633); Corpus Christi, TX
March 9, 2019; 2:30 p.m., KDF		Houston Baptist	L 56–74	14–15 (8–10)	Dugan Wellness Center (603); Corpus Christi, TX
Southland women's tournament
March 14, 2019; 1:30 p.m., ESPN+	(6)	vs. (7) New Orleans; First round	W 69–47	15–15	Merrell Center (946); Katy, TX
March 15, 2019; 1:30 p.m., ESPN+	(6)	vs. (3) Nicholls; Second round	W 69–56	16–15	Merrell Center (1,425); Katy, TX
March 16, 2019; 3:30 p.m., ESPN+	(6)	vs. (2) Stephen F. Austin; Semifinals	W 58–56	17–15	Merrell Center (1,725); Katy, TX
March 17, 2019; 1:00 p.m., CBSSN	(6)	vs. (4) Abilene Christian; Finals	L 68–69	17–16	Merrell Center; Katy, TX
*Non-conference game. ^{#}Rankings from AP poll. (#) Tournament seedings in parentheses. All times are in Central.

== See also ==
- 2018–19 Texas A&M–Corpus Christi Islanders men's basketball team
