= 2018–19 Abilene Christian Wildcats women's basketball team =

Intercollegiate basketball season

2018–19 Abilene Christian Wildcats women's basketball

Southland tournament champions

NCAA tournament, first round
- Conference: Southland Conference
- Record: 23–10 (13–5 Southland)
- Head coach: Julie Goodenough (7th season)
- Assistant coaches: Erika Lambert; Erik Deroo; Drew Cole
- Home arena: Moody Coliseum

2018–19 Southland Conference women's basketball standings
	Conf.				Overall
Team	W		L	PCT	W		L	PCT
Lamar	17	–	1	.944	24	–	7	.774
Stephen F. Austin	16	–	2	.889	25	–	7	.781
Nicholls	14	–	4	.778	20	–	12	.625
Abilene Christian †	13	–	5	.722	23	–	10	.697
Sam Houston State	11	–	7	.611	16	–	13	.552
Texas A&M–CC	8	–	10	.444	17	–	16	.515
New Orleans	8	–	10	.444	12	–	16	.429
Central Arkansas	6	–	12	.333	12	–	18	.400
Northwestern State	6	–	12	.333	11	–	18	.379
McNeese State	5	–	13	.278	7	–	22	.241
Incarnate Word	5	–	13	.278	5	–	24	.172
Houston Baptist	4	–	14	.222	9	–	19	.321
Southeastern Louisiana	4	–	14	.222	9	–	20	.310
† 2019 Southland tournament winner Rankings from AP poll

The 2018–19 Abilene Christian Wildcats women's basketball team represented Abilene Christian University during the 2018–19 NCAA Division I women's basketball season. The Wildcats, led by seventh-year head coach Julie Goodenough, played their home games at the Moody Coliseum in Abilene, Texas as members of the Southland Conference. They finished the season 23–10, 13–5 in Southland play, to finish in fourth place. They won the Southland women's tournament to earn an automatic bid to the NCAA women's tournament for the first time in school history. They lost in the first round to Baylor.

== Previous season ==
The Wildcats finished the 2017–18 season 16–14, 9–9 in Southland play, to finish in seventh place. In the Southland women's tournament, they defeated New Orleans in the first round. Their season ended when they lost to Central Arkansas in the tournament quarterfinals.

== Roster ==
2018–19 Abilene Christian Wildcats women's basketball team
Players
Coaches

Pos.	#	Name	Height	Year	Previous school	Hometown
G	0	Kamryn Mraz	5 ft 6 in (1.68 m)	Fr	Academy HS	Little River, TX
G/F	3	Dominique Golightly	5 ft 11 in (1.8 m)	Jr	Chickasha HS	Chickasha, OK
G	10	Breanna Wright	5 ft 8 in (1.73 m)	Jr	Jarell HS	Jarrell, TX
G	11	Sara Williamson	5 ft 10 in (1.78 m)	Sr	Rockwall HS	Rowlett, TX
G	12	Josie Larson	5 ft 9 in (1.75 m)	So	Johnson HS	San Antonio, TX
G	13	Jazz Taylor	5 ft 7 in (1.7 m)	Jr	Duncanville HS	Duncanville, TX
G	14	Pamela Herrara	5 ft 6 in (1.68 m)	Jr	Bel Air HS	El Paso, TX
G	21	Kayla Galindo	5 ft 4 in (1.63 m)	So	Riverside HS	El Paso, TX
F	23	Jenna Cooper	5 ft 11 in (1.8 m)	Fr	Claude HS	Claude, TX
F	24	Diamond Willcot	5 ft 11 in (1.8 m)	Fr	South Grand Prairie HS	Cedar Hill, TX
C	25	Lexi Kirgan	6 ft 4 in (1.93 m)	Jr	Bullard HS	Bullard, TX
G/F	30	Anna McLeod	6 ft 0 in (1.83 m)	Jr	Home School	Houston, TX
G	31	Madi Miller	5 ft 9 in (1.75 m)	Fr	Wylie HS	Wylie, TX
F/C	32	Makayla Mabry	6 ft 1 in (1.85 m)	So	Incarnate Word HS	San Antonio, TX
F/C	33	Alyssa Adams	6 ft 1 in (1.85 m)	So	Johnson HS	San Antonio, TX
F	44	Lexie Ducat	6 ft 1 in (1.85 m)	Jr	Brock HS	Brock, TX

Head coach

- Julie Goodenough (Abilene Christian)

Assistant coach(es)

- Erika Lambert (College of Charleston)
- Erik DeRoo (Fresno State)
- Drew Cole (Aurora)

Legend

- (C) Team captain
- (S) Suspended
- (I) Ineligible
- (W) Walk-on
- Injured
- Current redshirt

Roster
Last update: October 14, 2024

== Schedule ==
Date time, TV	Rank^{#}	Opponent^{#}	Result	Record	Site (attendance) city, state
Non-conference regular season
November 9, 2018*; 5:30 p.m.		Southwest	W 90–47	1–0	Moody Coliseum (1,018); Abilene, TX
November 15, 2018*; 6:00 p.m.		Howard Payne	W 98–43	2–0	Moody Coliseum (3,500); Abilene, TX
November 17, 2018*; 6:00 p.m.		Eastern New Mexico	W 78–46	3–0	Moody Coliseum (1,017); Abilene, TX
November 20, 2018*; 7:00 p.m., Aggie Vision		at New Mexico State	W 58–46	4–0	Pan American Center (676); Las Cruces, NM
November 23, 2018*; 1:00 p.m.		vs. Texas Southern; UTEP Thanksgiving Classic	W 81–39	5–0	Don Haskins Center; El Paso, TX
November 24, 2018*; 7:00 p.m.		at UTEP; UTEP Thanksgiving Classic	W 70–69	6–0	Don Haskins Center (983); El Paso, TX
November 28, 2018*; 7:00 p.m.		at Tulsa	L 63–75	6–1	Reynolds Center (871); Tulsa, OK
December 1, 2018*; 1:00 p.m.		Schreiner	W 90–43	7–1	Moody Coliseum (1,028); Abilene, TX
December 8, 2018*; 1:00 p.m., ELVN		Arkansas	L 68–80	7–2	Moody Coliseum (1,288); Abilene, TX
December 17, 2018*; 7:05 p.m., ESPN+		at Florida Gulf Coast	L 65–81	7–3	Alico Arena (1,758); Fort Myers, FL
December 29, 2018*; 2:00 p.m., FSSW		at Texas Tech	L 54–105	7–4	United Supermarkets Arena (3,790); Lubbock, TX
Southland regular season
January 2, 2019; 7:00 p.m.		at New Orleans	W 59–52	8–4 (1–0)	Lakefront Arena (212); New Orleans, LA
January 5, 2019; 3:00 p.m.		at Sam Houston State	W 91–79	9–4 (2–0)	Bernard G. Johnson Coliseum (528); Huntsville, TX
January 9, 2019; 6:00 p.m.		McNeese State	W 109–52	10–4 (3–0)	Moody Coliseum (1,099); Abilene, TX
January 12, 2019; 1:00 p.m.		at Southeastern Louisiana	L 71–74	10–5 (3–1)	University Center (502); Hammond, LA
January 16, 2019; 7:00 p.m.		at Houston Baptist	W 72–62	11–5 (4–1)	Sharp Gymnasium (325); Houston, TX
January 19, 2019; 1:00 p.m.		at Northwestern State	W 72–63	12–5 (5–1)	Prather Coliseum (591); Natchitoches, LA
January 23, 2019; 6:00 p.m.		Stephen F. Austin	L 55–71	12–6 (5–2)	Moody Coliseum (1,231); Abilene, TX
January 26, 2019; 1:00 p.m., ESPN+		Central Arkansas	W 77–70	13–6 (6–2)	Moody Coliseum (1,119); Abilene, TX
January 30, 2019; 7:00 p.m.		at Texas A&M–Corpus Christi	W 72–68	14–6 (7–2)	Dugan Wellness Center (658); Corpus Christi, TX
February 6, 2019; 6:00 p.m., ESPN+		Lamar	L 60–63	14–7 (7–3)	Moody Coliseum (1,129); Abilene, TX
February 9, 2019; 1:00 p.m.		Sam Houston State	L 63–72	14–8 (7–4)	Moody Coliseum (1,209); Abilene, TX
February 13, 2019; 6:00 p.m.		vs. Nicholls	W 76–66	15–8 (8–4)	Mabee Complex (1,009); Abilene, TX
February 16, 2019; 1:00 p.m.		Incarnate Word	W 71–50	16–8 (9–4)	McDermott Convocation Center; San Antonio, TX
February 23, 2019; 1:00 p.m.		Southeastern Louisiana	W 61–58	17–8 (10–4)	Moody Coliseum (703); Abilene, TX
February 27, 2019; 6:00 p.m., ESPN+		Texas A&M–Corpus Christi	W 72–55	18–8 (11–4)	Moody Coliseum (1,192); Corpus Christi, TX
March 2, 2019; 2:00 p.m.		at Central Arkansas	W 67–65	19–8 (12–4)	Farris Center; Conway, AR
March 6, 2019; 6:30 p.m., ESPN3		at Stephen F. Austin	L 48–65	19–9 (12–5)	William R. Johnson Coliseum (1,132); Nacogdoches, TX
March 9, 2019; 1:00 p.m.		Incarnate Word	W 102–53	20–9 (13–5)	Moody Coliseum (1,111); Abilene, TX
Southland women's tournament
March 15, 2019; 11:00 a.m., ESPN+	(4)	vs. (8) Central Arkansas; Second round	W 82–54	21–9	Merrell Center; Katy, TX
March 16, 2019; 1:00 p.m., ESPN+	(4)	vs. (1) Lamar; Semifinals	W 88–79	22–9	Merrell Center (1,725); Katy, TX
March 17, 2019; 1:00 p.m., CBSSN	(4)	vs. (6) Texas A&M–Corpus Christi; Finals	W 69–68	23–9	Merrell Center; Katy, TX
NCAA women's tournament
March 23, 2019; 4:30 p.m., ESPN2	(16 C)	at (1 C) No. 1 Baylor; First round	L 38–95	23–10	Ferrell Center (6,669); Waco, TX
*Non-conference game. ^{#}Rankings from AP poll. (#) Tournament seedings in parentheses. C=Chicago Region. All times are in Central.

== See also ==
- 2018–19 Abilene Christian Wildcats men's basketball team
