= 2018–19 Northwestern State Lady Demons basketball team =

Intercollegiate basketball season

2018–19 Northwestern State Lady Demons basketball
- Conference: Southland Conference
- Record: 11–18 (6–12 Southland)
- Head coach: Jordan Dupuy (3rd season)
- Assistant coaches: Deneen Parker; Olivia Grayson; Nicolle Mitchell
- Home arena: Prather Coliseum (Capacity: 3,900)

2018–19 Southland Conference women's basketball standings
	Conf.				Overall
Team	W		L	PCT	W		L	PCT
Lamar	17	–	1	.944	24	–	7	.774
Stephen F. Austin	16	–	2	.889	25	–	7	.781
Nicholls	14	–	4	.778	20	–	12	.625
Abilene Christian †	13	–	5	.722	23	–	10	.697
Sam Houston State	11	–	7	.611	16	–	13	.552
Texas A&M–CC	8	–	10	.444	17	–	16	.515
New Orleans	8	–	10	.444	12	–	16	.429
Central Arkansas	6	–	12	.333	12	–	18	.400
Northwestern State	6	–	12	.333	11	–	18	.379
McNeese State	5	–	13	.278	7	–	22	.241
Incarnate Word	5	–	13	.278	5	–	24	.172
Houston Baptist	4	–	14	.222	9	–	19	.321
Southeastern Louisiana	4	–	14	.222	9	–	20	.310
† 2019 Southland tournament winner Rankings from AP poll

The 2018–19 Northwestern State Lady Demons basketball team represented Northwestern State University during the 2018–19 NCAA Division I women's basketball season. The Demons, led by third-year head coach Jordan Dupuy, played their home games at Prather Coliseum and were members of the Southland Conference. They finished the season 11–18, 6–12 in Southland play to finish in eighth place. Due to a tiebreaker loss to New Orleans, they failed to qualify for the Southland women's tournament.

== Previous season ==
The Lady Demons finished the 2017–18 season 7–22, 2–16 in Southland play to finish in twelfth place. They failed to qualify for the Southland women's tournament.

== Roster ==
2018–19 Northwestern State Demons women's basketball team
Players
Coaches

Pos.	#	Name	Height	Year	Previous school	Hometown
G	0	Nautica Grant	5 ft 5 in (1.65 m)	Sr	Tyler JC	Dallas, TX
G	1	Gabby Bell	5 ft 4 in (1.63 m)	Jr	Martin HS	Arlington, TX
G	2	Nia Randall	5 ft 7 in (1.7 m)	RS So	Garland HS	Garland, TX
G	3	Jada Freeman	5 ft 8 in (1.73 m)	So	Ranchview HS	Irving, TX
F	4	Lacee Savage	6 ft 0 in (1.83 m)	So	Clear Creek HS	Houston, TX
G	5	Sami Thomas	5 ft 5 in (1.65 m)	RS Sr	Pickering HS	Leesville, LA
F	13	Victoria Miller	6 ft 0 in (1.83 m)	Jr	Hebron HS	Carrollton, TX
F	15	Jasmyn Johnson	5 ft 8 in (1.73 m)	Jr	West Monroe HS	West Monroe, LA
F	20	Leah Barnes	6 ft 1 in (1.85 m)	Sr	Richfield HS; North Dakota State College of Science	Richfield, MN
F	22	Libba Gilliam	6 ft 1 in (1.85 m)	Sr	Madison Academy	Huntsville, AL
F	23	Joycelyn Scott	5 ft 11 in (1.8 m)	Jr	McKinney North HS	McKinney, TX

Head coach

- Jordan Dupuy (Southern Miss)

Assistant coach(es)

- Deneen Parker (Stephen F. Austin)
- Olivia Grayson (Tulane)
- Nicole Mitchell (Christopher Newport)

Legend

- (C) Team captain
- (S) Suspended
- (I) Ineligible
- (W) Walk-on
- Injured
- Current redshirt

Roster
Last update: September 14, 2018

== Schedule ==
Date time, TV	Rank^{#}	Opponent^{#}	Result	Record	Site (attendance) city, state
Non-conference regular season
Nov 9, 2018*; 10:30 am, SECN+		at Arkansas	L 53–98	0–1	Bud Walton Arena (5,497); Fayetteville, AR
Nov 12, 2018*; 12:00 pm		LeTourneau	W 100–40	1–1	Prather Coliseum (687); Natchitoches, LA
Nov 15, 2018*; 7:30 pm		at Oklahoma	L 56–93	1–2	Lloyd Noble Center (2,314); Norman, OK
Nov 20, 2018*; 6:30 pm		Alcorn State	W 78–65	2–2	Prather Coliseum (575); Natchitoches, LA
Nov 24, 2018*; 1:00 pm		Loyola (LA)	W 71–66	3–2	Prather Coliseum (578); Natchitoches, LA
Nov 27, 2018*; 6:00 pm		at Southern Miss	L 54–69	3–3	Reed Green Coliseum (1,143); Hattiesburg, MS
Dec 2, 2018*; 2:00 pm		Louisiana–Monroe	L 55–63	3–4	Prather Coliseum (601); Natchitoches, LA
Dec 8, 2018*; 1:00 pm		Centenary	W 94–51	4–4	Prather Coliseum (581); Natchitoches, LA
Dec 16, 2018*; 2:00 pm, SECN+		at Alabama	L 73–87	4–5	Coleman Coliseum (2,113); Tuscaloosa, AL
Dec 20, 2018*; 1:00 pm		Central Baptist	W 82–56	5–5	Prather Coliseum (583); Natchitoches, LA
Dec 29, 2018*; 1:00 pm		at No. 13 Texas	L 66–104	5–6	Frank Erwin Center (3,325); Austin, TX
Southland Conference schedule
Jan 2, 2019; 6:00 pm		at Nicholls	L 87–96	5–7 (0–1)	Stopher Gym (144); Thibodaux, LA
Jan 5, 2019; 1:00 pm		McNeese State	W 82–63	6–7 (1–1)	Prather Coliseum (1,034); Natchitoches, LA
Jan 9, 2019; 7:00 pm		at Texas A&M–Corpus Christi	L 55–79	6–8 (1–2)	Dugan Wellness Center (513); Corpus Christi, TX
Jan 12, 2019; 1:00 pm		at Stephen F. Austin	L 56–84	6–9 (1–3)	William R. Johnson Coliseum (1,556); Nacogdoches, TX
Jan 19, 2019; 1:00 pm		Abilene Christian	L 63–72	6–10 (1–4)	Prather Coliseum (591); Natchitoches, LA
Jan 23, 2019; 6:30 pm		at Sam Houston State	L 55–66	6–11 (1–5)	Bernard G. Johnson Coliseum (693); Huntsville, TX
Jan 26, 2019; 1:00 pm		Southeastern Louisiana	W 58–47	7–11 (2–5)	Prather Coliseum (801); Natchitoches, LA
Jan 30, 2019; 6:30 pm		New Orleans	L 62–67	7–12 (2–6)	Prather Coliseum (615); Natchitoches, LA
Feb 2, 2019; 2:00 pm		at Central Arkansas	L 52–74	7–13 (2–7)	Farris Center (571); Conway, AR
Feb 6, 2019; 6:00 pm		at New Orleans	L 73–84	7–14 (2–8)	Lakefront Arena (259); New Orleans, LA
Feb 9, 2019; 1:00 pm		at McNeese State	W 89–73	8–14 (3–8)	H&HP Complex (2,373); Lake Charles, LA
Feb 13, 2019; 6:30 pm		Lamar	L 70–94	8–15 (3–9)	Prather Coliseum (787); Natchitoches, LA
Feb 16, 2019; 1:00 pm		Stephen F. Austin	L 67–87	8–16 (3–10)	Prather Coliseum (888); Natchitoches, LA
Feb 21, 2019; 6:30 pm		Houston Baptist	W 63–46	9–16 (4–10)	Prather Coliseum (690); Natchitoches, LA
Feb 27, 2019; 6:30 pm		at Incarnate Word	L 91–100	9–17 (4–11)	McDermott Convocation Center (511); San Antonio, TX
Mar 2, 2019; 1:00 pm		at Southeastern Louisiana	W 60–56 ^{2OT}	10–17 (5–11)	University Center (609); Hammond, LA
Mar 6, 2019; 6:30 pm		Nicholls State	L 67–89	10–18 (5–12)	Prather Coliseum (702); Natchitoches, LA
Mar 9, 2019; 1:00 pm		Central Arkansas	W 78–74	11–18 (6–12)	Prather Coliseum (872); Natchitoches, LA
*Non-conference game. ^{#}Rankings from AP Poll. (#) Tournament seedings in parentheses. All times are in Central Time..

== See also ==
- 2018–19 Northwestern State Demons basketball team
