= 2018–19 Stephen F. Austin Ladyjacks basketball team =

Intercollegiate basketball season

2018–19 Stephen F. Austin Ladyjacks basketball

2019 Women's National Invitation Tournament, First round
- Conference: Southland Conference
- Record: 25–7 (16–2 Southland)
- Head coach: Mark Kellogg (4th season)
- Assistant coaches: Rebecca Alvidrez; Jessica Grayson; Leonard Bishop
- Home arena: William R. Johnson Coliseum

2018–19 Southland Conference women's basketball standings
	Conf.				Overall
Team	W		L	PCT	W		L	PCT
Lamar	17	–	1	.944	24	–	7	.774
Stephen F. Austin	16	–	2	.889	25	–	7	.781
Nicholls	14	–	4	.778	20	–	12	.625
Abilene Christian †	13	–	5	.722	23	–	10	.697
Sam Houston State	11	–	7	.611	16	–	13	.552
Texas A&M–CC	8	–	10	.444	17	–	16	.515
New Orleans	8	–	10	.444	12	–	16	.429
Central Arkansas	6	–	12	.333	12	–	18	.400
Northwestern State	6	–	12	.333	11	–	18	.379
McNeese State	5	–	13	.278	7	–	22	.241
Incarnate Word	5	–	13	.278	5	–	24	.172
Houston Baptist	4	–	14	.222	9	–	19	.321
Southeastern Louisiana	4	–	14	.222	9	–	20	.310
† 2019 Southland tournament winner Rankings from AP poll

The 2018–19 Stephen F. Austin Ladyjacks basketball team represented Stephen F. Austin University during the 2018–19 NCAA Division I women's basketball season. The Ladyjacks were led by fourth-year head coach Mark Kellogg and played their home games at the William R. Johnson Coliseum. They were members of the Southland Conference.

The Ladyjacks finished the 2018–19 season 25–7, 16–2 in Southland play, to finish in second place. They lost to Texas A&M–Corpus Christi in the semifinal round of the Southland women's tournament. They received an at-large bid to the WNIT where they lost in the first round to UT Arlington.

== Previous season ==
The Ladyjacks finished the 2017–18 season 25–7, 12–6 in Southland play, to finish in second place. They advanced to the championship game of the Southland women's tournament where they lost to Nicholls State. They received an at-large bid to the WNIT where they lost in the first round to George Mason.

== Roster ==
2018–19 Stephen F. Austin Lumberjacks women's basketball team
Players
Coaches

Pos.	#	Name	Height	Year	Previous school	Hometown
G	1	Brioenne Burns	5 ft 11 in (1.8 m)	So	William Chrisman HS	Independence, MO
G	2	Alyssa Mayfield	5 ft 11 in (1.8 m)	So	John Tyler HS	Tyler, TX
G	3	Chanell Hayes	5 ft 11 in (1.8 m)	Sr	Texas HS	Texarkana, AR
G	4	Kennedy Harris	5 ft 8 in (1.73 m)	Sr	Anderson HS	Austin, TX
G	10	Brianna Mitchell	5 ft 4 in (1.63 m)	Fr	Anderson HS	Marshall, TX
G	11	Heaven Hamling	5 ft 8 in (1.73 m)	Fr	Grand Rapids HS	Grand Rapids, MI
F	12	Kia Fisher	6 ft 2 in (1.88 m)	Sr	Århus Statsgymnasium; Panola College	Aarhus, Denmark
F	13	Stephanie Visscher	6 ft 0 in (1.83 m)	Fr	BG Luleå	Luleå, Sweden
G	14	Marissa Banfield	5 ft 8 in (1.73 m)	So	Westbury Christian HS	Friendswood, TX
F	21	Aiyanna Johnson	6 ft 3 in (1.91 m)	Fr	Lee's Summit North HS	Lee's Summit, MO
F	23	Riley Harvey	6 ft 0 in (1.83 m)	Jr	Howe HS	Howe, TX
F	32	Imani Johnson	6 ft 0 in (1.83 m)	RS Sr	Lee's Summit North HS; Southeast Missouri State	Lee's Summit, MO
C	33	Aaliyah Johnson	6 ft 2 in (1.88 m)	So	Lee's Summit North HS	Lee's Summit, MO

Head coach

- Mark Kellogg (Austin College)

Assistant coach(es)

- Rebecca Alvidrez (Montana State)
- Jessica Grayson (Austin Peay)
- Leonard Bishop (East Texas A&M)

Legend

- (C) Team captain
- (S) Suspended
- (I) Ineligible
- (W) Walk-on
- Injured
- Current redshirt

Roster
Last update: July 20, 2024

== Schedule ==
Date time, TV	Rank^{#}	Opponent^{#}	Result	Record	Site (attendance) city, state
Non-conference regular season
November 9, 2018*; 10:00 a.m.		at Miami (FL); Preseason WNIT first round	L 60–81	0–1	Watsco Center (3,079); Coral Gables, FL
November 16, 2018*; 6:30 p.m.		Morgan State; Preseason WNIT consolation round	W 69–42	1–1	William R. Johnson Coliseum (762); Nacogdoches, TX
November 17, 2018*; 4:30 p.m.		Yale; Preseason WNIT consolation round	W 67–57	2–1	William R. Johnson Coliseum (1,307); Nacogdoches, TX
November 20, 2018*; 5:00 p.m., ESPN3		Our Lady of the Lake	W 93–77	3–1	William R. Johnson Coliseum (1,247); Nacogdoches, TX
November 24, 2018*; 2:00 p.m., ESPN3		Tulsa	W 76–34	4–1	William R. Johnson Coliseum (1,303); Nacogdoches, TX
November 28, 2018*; 7:00 p.m.		at Texas Tech	L 69–77	4–2	United Supermarkets Arena (2,616); Lubbock, TX
December 1, 2018*; 2:00 p.m.		Wiley College	W 97–38	5–2	William R. Johnson Coliseum (1,306); Nacogdoches, TX
December 6, 2018*; 11:00 a.m.		Montana State	W 60–53	6–2	William R. Johnson Coliseum (2,198); Nacogdoches, TX
December 15, 2018*; 8:00 p.m.		Texas Southern	W 74–55	7–2	William R. Johnson Coliseum (1,092); Nacogdoches, TX
December 19, 2018*; 5:30 p.m.		vs. Hampton; New Mexico Lobo Invitational	W 70–68	8–2	Dreamstyle Arena; Albuquerque, NM
December 20, 2018*; 8:00 p.m.		at New Mexico; New Mexico Lobo Invitational	L 33–74	8–3	Dreamstyle Arena (4,702); Albuquerque, NM
December 29, 2018*; 2:00 p.m., ESPN3		Cameron	W 86–59	9–3	William R. Johnson Coliseum (1,233); Nacogdoches, TX
Southland Conference regular season
January 2, 2019; 7:00 p.m.		at Southeastern Louisiana	W 62–51	10–3 (1–0)	University Center (487); Hammond, LA
January 9, 2019; 6:30 p.m., ESPN3		Nicholls	W 70–62	11–3 (2–0)	William R. Johnson Coliseum (1,303); Nacogdoches, TX
January 12, 2019; 2:00 p.m., ESPN3		Northwestern State	W 84–56	12–3 (3–0)	William R. Johnson Coliseum (1,556); Nacogdoches, TX
January 16, 2019; 6:00 p.m., ESPN3		New Orleans	W 97–38	13–3 (4–0)	William R. Johnson Coliseum (1,088); Nacogdoches, TX
January 19, 2019; 1:00 p.m., ESPN3		at Incarnate Word	W 66–56	14–3 (5–0)	McDermott Convocation Center (854); San Antonio, TX
January 23, 2019; 6:00 p.m.		at Abilene Christian	W 71–55	15–3 (6–0)	Moody Coliseum (1,231); Abilene, TX
January 30, 2019; 7:00 p.m.		at Central Arkansas	W 59–53	16–3 (7–0)	Farris Center (421); Conway, AR
February 2, 2019; 2:00 p.m.		at Sam Houston State	W 78–68	17–3 (8–0)	Bernard G. Johnson Coliseum (1,238); Huntsville, TX
February 6, 2019; 7:00 p.m., ESPN3		Houston Baptist	W 65–53	18–3 (9–0)	William R. Johnson Coliseum (1,011); Nacogdoches, TX
February 9, 2019; 2:00 p.m., ESPN3		Lamar	W 70–58	19–3 (10–0)	William R. Johnson Coliseum (4,676); Nacogdoches, TX
February 13, 2019; 6:30 p.m.		at McNeese State	W 97–48	20–3 (11–0)	H&HP Complex (1,567); Lake Charles, LA
February 16, 2019; 1:00 p.m.		at Northwestern State	W 87–67	21–3 (12–0)	Prather Coliseum (888); Natchitoches, LA
February 20, 2019; 7:00 p.m.		at Texas A&M–Corpus Christi	L 44–46	21–4 (12–1)	Dugan Wellness Center (501); Corpus Christi, TX
February 23, 2019; 2:00 p.m., ESPN3		Incarnate Word	W 65–48	22–4 (13–1)	William R. Johnson Coliseum (2,684); Nacogdoches, TX
February 27, 2019; 7:00 p.m., ESPN3		Central Arkansas	W 79–43	23–4 (14–1)	William R. Johnson Coliseum (1,504); Nacogdoches, TX
March 2, 2019; 2:00 p.m., ESPN3		at Lamar	L 46–62	23–5 (14–2)	Montagne Center (3,551); Beaumont, TX
March 6, 2019; 6:30 p.m., ESPN3		Abilene Christian	W 65–48	24–5 (15–2)	William R. Johnson Coliseum (1,132); Nacogdoches, TX
March 9, 2019; 2:00 p.m., ESPN3		Sam Houston State	W 83–75	25–5 (16–2)	William R. Johnson Coliseum (3,611); Nacogdoches, TX
Southland women's tournament
March 16, 2019; 3:30 p.m., ESPN+	(2)	vs. (6) Texas A&M–Corpus Christi; Semifinals	L 56–58	25–6	Merrell Center (1,725); Katy, TX
WNIT
March 21, 2019; 7:00 p.m.		at UT Arlington; First round	L 54–60	25–7	College Park Center (1,159); Arlington, TX
*Non-conference game. ^{#}Rankings from AP poll. (#) Tournament seedings in parentheses. All times are in Central.

== See also ==
- 2018–19 Stephen F. Austin Lumberjacks basketball team
