= 2018–19 Central Arkansas Sugar Bears basketball team =

Intercollegiate basketball season

2018–19 Central Arkansas Sugar Bears basketball
- Conference: Southland Conference
- Record: 12–18 (6–12 Southland)
- Head coach: Sandra Rushing (7th season)
- Assistant coaches: Greg Long; Jason Conner; Heather Karner
- Home arena: Farris Center (Capacity: 6,000)

2018–19 Southland Conference women's basketball standings
	Conf.				Overall
Team	W		L	PCT	W		L	PCT
Lamar	17	–	1	.944	24	–	7	.774
Stephen F. Austin	16	–	2	.889	25	–	7	.781
Nicholls	14	–	4	.778	20	–	12	.625
Abilene Christian †	13	–	5	.722	23	–	10	.697
Sam Houston State	11	–	7	.611	16	–	13	.552
Texas A&M–CC	8	–	10	.444	17	–	16	.515
New Orleans	8	–	10	.444	12	–	16	.429
Central Arkansas	6	–	12	.333	12	–	18	.400
Northwestern State	6	–	12	.333	11	–	18	.379
McNeese State	5	–	13	.278	7	–	22	.241
Incarnate Word	5	–	13	.278	5	–	24	.172
Houston Baptist	4	–	14	.222	9	–	19	.321
Southeastern Louisiana	4	–	14	.222	9	–	20	.310
† 2019 Southland tournament winner Rankings from AP poll

The 2018–19 Central Arkansas Sugar Bears basketball team represented the University of Central Arkansas during the 2018–19 NCAA Division I women's basketball season. The Sugar Bears were led by seventh-year head coach Sandra Rushing and played their home games at the Farris Center in Conway, Arkansas. They were members of the Southland Conference. The Sugar Bears finished the season 12–18, 6–12 in Southland play, to finish in a tie for eighth place.

== Previous season ==
The Sugar Bears finished the 2017–18 season 25–10, 14–4 in Southland play, to finish in third place. They advanced to the semifinals of the Southland women's tournament, where they lost to Stephen F. Austin. They received an invitation to the WBI, where they defeated SIU Ewardsville, Weber State and Nevada in the first round, quarterfinals and semifinals, respectively, to advance to the championship game, where they lost to Yale in the championship game.

== Roster ==
2018–19 Central Arkansas Sugar Bears women's basketball team
Players
Coaches

Pos.	#	Name	Height	Year	Previous school	Hometown
G	2	Kamry Orr	5 ft 6 in (1.68 m)	Sr	Little Rock HS	Little Rock, AR
G	4	Taylor Sells	5 ft 7 in (1.7 m)	Jr	Booker T. Washington HS	Tulsa, OK
G	5	Maddie Goodner	5 ft 6 in (1.68 m)	Jr	Greenwood HS	Greenwood, AR
G	10	Antonjia Bozic	5 ft 10 in (1.78 m)	Sr	Jacksonville College	Slavonski Brod, Croatia
F	11	Mekaylan Hicks	6 ft 0 in (1.83 m)	So	El Dorado HS	El Dorado, AR
G	12	Carley Hudspeth	5 ft 11 in (1.8 m)	Fr	Kirk Academy	Grenada, MS
G	15	Savannah Lowe	5 ft 8 in (1.73 m)	So	Conway HS	Conway, AR
G	21	Kavaci-A Johnson	5 ft 5 in (1.65 m)	Fr	Byhalia HS	Byhalia, MS
F	22	Alana Canady	5 ft 11 in (1.8 m)	Fr	Sylvan Hills HS	Sherwood, AR
F	23	Keturah Bingham	6 ft 1 in (1.85 m)	Jr	Ouachita Parish HS; SW Mississippi CC	Monroe, LA
G	24	Alanie Fisher	5 ft 9 in (1.75 m)	Sr	University HS; Coffeyville CC	Baton Rouge, LA
C	33	Alexyse Thomas	6 ft 3 in (1.91 m)	RS Jr	Horn Lake HS; Wright State	Horn Lake, MS
C	42	Hannah Langhi	6 ft 2 in (1.88 m)	So	Marshall County HS	Hardin, KY

Head coach

- Sandra Rushing (Alabama)

Assistant coach(es)

- Greg Long (Chowan)
- Jason Conner (Delta State)
- Heather Karner (Youngstown State)

Legend

- (C) Team captain
- (S) Suspended
- (I) Ineligible
- (W) Walk-on
- Injured
- Current redshirt

Roster
Last update: April 2, 2025

== Schedule ==
Date time, TV	Rank^{#}	Opponent^{#}	Result	Record	Site (attendance) city, state
Non-conference regular schedule
November 6, 2018*; 7:00 p.m.		Central Baptist	W 55–34	1–0	Farris Center (521); Conway, AR
November 10, 2018*; 12:00 p.m.		Hendrix College	W 72–40	2–0	Farris Center (459); Conway, AR
November 13, 2018*; 12:00 p.m.		at Jackson State	L 56–65	2–1	Williams Assembly Center (302); Jackson, MS
November 17, 2018*; 2:00 p.m.		South Alabama	L 50–58	2–2	Farris Center (325); Conway, AR
November 28, 2018*; 5:30 p.m.		at Alcorn State	W 57–46	3–2	Davey Whitney Complex (114); Lorman, MS
December 1, 2018*; 2:00 p.m.		Crowley's Ridge College	W 91–35	4–2	Farris Center (375); Conway, AR
December 5, 2018*; 2:00 p.m., FSNOK		at Oklahoma	L 52–65	4–3	Lloyd Noble Center (2,381); Norman, OK
December 8, 2018*; 2:00 p.m.		at Texas A&M	L 27–84	4–4	Reed Arena (3,154); College Station, TX
December 17, 2018*; 2:00 p.m.		Williams Baptist College	W 70–35	5–4	Farris Center (326); Conway, AR
December 20, 2018*; 7:00 p.m., ESPN3		at Kansas State	L 54–70	5–5	Bramlage Coliseum (2,858); Manhattan, KS
Southland Conference schedule
December 31, 2018; 1:00 p.m.		Texas A&M–Corpus Christi	L 65–73	5–6 (0–1)	Farris Center (295); Conway, AR
January 5, 2019; 1:00 p.m.		at Southeastern Louisiana	L 53–62	5–7 (0–2)	University Center (521); Hammond, LA
January 9, 2019; 6:30 p.m.		at Sam Houston State	L 62–66	5–8 (0–3)	Bernard G. Johnson Coliseum (428); Huntsville, TX
January 12, 2019; 2:00 p.m., ESPN3		at Lamar	L 37–57	5–9 (0–4)	Montagne Center (1,220); Beaumont, TX
January 16, 2019; 7:00 p.m.		Incarnate Word	W 74–43	6–9 (1–4)	Farris Center (327); Conway, AR
January 19, 2019; 1:00 p.m.		Nicholls	L 60–64	6–10 (1–5)	Farris Center (512); Conway, AR
January 23, 2019; 7:00 p.m.		at New Orleans	W 62–60	7–10 (2–5)	Lakefront Arena (232); New Orleans, LA
January 26, 2019; 1:00 p.m., ESPN+		at Abilene Christian	L 70–77	7–11 (2–6)	Moody Coliseum (1,119); Abilene, TX
January 30, 2019; 7:00 p.m.		Stephen F. Austin	L 53–59	7–12 (2–7)	Farris Center (421); Conway, AR
February 2, 2019; 2:00 p.m.		Northwestern State	W 74–52	8–12 (3–7)	Farris Center (571); Conway, AR
February 9, 2019; 2:00 p.m.		Southeastern Louisiana	W 75–33	9–12 (4–7)	Farris Center (1,825); Conway, AR
February 13, 2019; 7:00 p.m.		at Houston Baptist	W 77–58	10–12 (5–7)	Sharp Gymnasium (143); Houston, TX
February 20, 2019; 7:00 p.m.		McNeese State	W 76–45	11–12 (6–7)	Farris Center (328); Conway, AR
February 23, 2019; 4:00 p.m.		at Nicholls	L 52–68	11–13 (6–8)	Stopher Gym (409); Thibodaux, LA
February 27, 2019; 7:00 p.m., ESPN+		at Stephen F. Austin	L 43–79	11–14 (6–9)	William R. Johnson Coliseum (1,504); Nacogdoches, TX
March 2, 2019; 2:00 p.m.		Abilene Christian	L 65–67	11–15 (6–10)	Farris Center; Conway, AR
March 6, 2019; 7:00 p.m.		Sam Houston State	L 59–71	11–16 (6–11)	Farris Center (558); Conway, AR
March 9, 2019; 1:00 p.m.		at Northwestern State	L 74–78	11–17 (6–12)	Prather Coliseum (872); Natchitoches, LA
Southland women's tournament
March 14, 2019; 11:00 a.m., ESPN+	(8)	vs. (5) Sam Houston State; First round	W 76–71	12–17	Merrell Center; Katy, TX
March 15, 2019; 11:00 a.m., ESPN+	(8)	vs. (4) Abilene Christian; Second round	L 54–82	12–18	Merrell Center; Katy, TX
*Non-conference game. ^{#}Rankings from AP poll. (#) Tournament seedings in parentheses. All times are in Central.

== See also ==
- 2018–19 Central Arkansas Bears basketball team
