= 2018–19 Nicholls Colonels women's basketball team =

Intercollegiate basketball season

2018–19 Nicholls Colonels women's basketball

2019 Women's Basketball Invitational, First round
- Conference: Southland Conference
- Record: 20–12 (14–4 Southland)
- Head coach: DoBee Plaisance (11th season)
- Assistant coaches: Justin Payne; Kris Goff; Jenny Nash
- Home arena: Stopher Gym

2018–19 Southland Conference women's basketball standings
	Conf.				Overall
Team	W		L	PCT	W		L	PCT
Lamar	17	–	1	.944	24	–	7	.774
Stephen F. Austin	16	–	2	.889	25	–	7	.781
Nicholls	14	–	4	.778	20	–	12	.625
Abilene Christian †	13	–	5	.722	23	–	10	.697
Sam Houston State	11	–	7	.611	16	–	13	.552
Texas A&M–CC	8	–	10	.444	17	–	16	.515
New Orleans	8	–	10	.444	12	–	16	.429
Central Arkansas	6	–	12	.333	12	–	18	.400
Northwestern State	6	–	12	.333	11	–	18	.379
McNeese State	5	–	13	.278	7	–	22	.241
Incarnate Word	5	–	13	.278	5	–	24	.172
Houston Baptist	4	–	14	.222	9	–	19	.321
Southeastern Louisiana	4	–	14	.222	9	–	20	.310
† 2019 Southland tournament winner Rankings from AP poll

The 2018–19 Nicholls Colonels women's basketball team represented Nicholls State University during the 2018–19 NCAA Division I women's basketball season. The Colonels, led by eleventh year head coach DoBee Plaisance, played their home games at Stopher Gym and are members of the Southland Conference. The Colonels finished the 2018–19 season 20–12, 14–4 in Southland play to finish in third place. They lost to Texas A&M–Corpus Christi in the second round of the Southland women's tournament. They received an invitation to the 2019 Women's Basketball Invitational tournament where they lost in the first round to Southern Miss.

== Previous season ==
The Colonels finished the 2017–18 season 19–13, 11–7 in Southland play to finish in a three way tie for fourth place. They won their first Southland women's tournament and earned an automatic trip to their first NCAA women's tournament in school history where they lost in the first round to Mississippi State.

== Schedule ==
Date time, TV	Rank^{#}	Opponent^{#}	Result	Record	Site (attendance) city, state
Exhibition
Nov 1, 2018*; 6:00 pm		Spring Hill College	W 85–71		Stopher Gymnasium (201); Thibodaux, LA
Non-conference regular season
Nov 6, 2018*; 6:00 pm		at No. 4 Baylor	L 39–100	0–1	Ferrell Center (4,866); Waco, TX
Nov 9, 2018*; 7:00 pm, SECN+		at Auburn; 2018 Preseason WNIT First Round	L 59–80	0–2	Auburn Arena (2,316); Auburn, AL
Nov 16, 2018*; 6:30 pm		at Texas State; 2018 Preseason WNIT Consolation First Round	L 67–72	0–3	Strahan Arena (625); San Marcos, TX
Nov 17, 2018*; 4:00 pm		vs. Delaware; 2018 Preseason WNIT Consolation Second Round	L 56–71	0–4	Strahan Arena; San Marcos, TX
Nov 23, 2018*; 3:30 pm		at UTEP; UTEP Thanksgiving Classic	W 58–56	1–4	Don Haskins Center (381); El Paso, TX
Nov 24, 2018*; 5:00 pm		vs. Texas Southern; UTEP Thanksgiving Classic	W 58–57	2–4	Don Haskins Center; El Paso, TX
Nov 28, 2018*; 11:30 am		Southern University (New Orleans)	W 86–49	3–4	Stopher Gymnasium (807); Thibodaux, LA
Dec 1, 2018*; 1:00 am		Mississippi Valley State	W 72–47	4–4	Stopher Gymnasium (141); Thibodaux, LA
Dec 4, 2018*; 7:00 pm		at Tulane	L 46–71	4–5	Devlin Fieldhouse (809); New Orleans, LA
Dec 14, 2018*; 6:30 pm		at Louisiana–Monroe	W 55–54	5–5	Fant–Ewing Coliseum (1,221); Monroe, LA
Dec 18, 2018*; 6:30 pm, SECN+		at LSU	L 44–76	5–6	Pete Maravich Assembly Center (1,492); Baton Rouge, LA
Dec 21, 2018*; 11:30 am		William Carey	W 86–45	6–6	Stopher Gymnasium (96); Thibodaux, LA
Southland regular season
Jan 2, 2019; 6:00 pm		Northwestern State	W 97–86	7–6 (1–0)	Stopher Gym (144); Thibodaux, LA
Jan 5, 2019; 1:00 pm		Incarnate Word	W 86–62	8–6 (2–0)	Stopher Gym (161); Thibodaux, LA
Jan 9, 2019; 6:30 pm, ESPN3		at Stephen F. Austin	L 62–70	8–7 (2–1)	William R. Johnson Coliseum (1,303); Nacogdoches, TX
Jan 12, 2019; 1:00 pm		Houston Baptist	W 77–54	9–7 (3–1)	Stopher Gym (201); Thibodaux, LA
Jan 16, 2019; 6:30 pm		McNeese State	L 68–69	9–8 (3–2)	Stopher Gym (225); Thibodaux, LA
Jan 19, 2019; 1:00 pm		at Central Arkansas	W 64–60	10–8 (4–2)	Farris Center (512); Conway, AR
Jan 23, 2019; 6:00 pm		Texas A&M–Corpus Christi	W 85–55	11–8 (5–2)	Stopher Gym (405); Thibodaux, LA
Jan 30, 2019; 7:00 pm, ESPN+		at Lamar	L 65–78	11–9 (5–3)	Montagne Center (1,411); Beaumont, TX
Feb 2, 2019; 1:00 pm, ESPN3		at Southeastern Louisiana	W 73–66	12–9 (6–3)	University Center (635); Hammond, LA
Feb 9, 2019; 2:00 pm		at New Orleans	W 76–62	13–9 (7–3)	Lakefront Arena (344); New Orleans, LA
Feb 13, 2019; 7:00 pm		vs. Abilene Christian	L 66–76	13–10 (7–4)	Mabee Complex (1,009); Abilene, TX
Feb 16, 2019; 2:00 pm		at Houston Baptist	W 58–55	14–10 (8–4)	Sharp Gymnasium (509); Houston, TX
Feb 20, 2019; 6:00 pm		Sam Houston State	W 84–81	15–10 (9–4)	Stopher Gym (414); Thibodaux, LA
Feb 23, 2019; 4:00 pm		Central Arkansas	W 68–52	16–10 (10–4)	Stopher Gym (409); Thibodaux, LA
Feb 27, 2019; 6:30 pm		at McNeese State	W 78–55	17–10 (11–4)	H&HP Complex (1,736); Lake Charles, LA
Mar 2, 2019; 1:00 pm		New Orleans	W 66–58	18–10 (12–4)	Stopher Gym (411); Thibodaux, LA
Mar 6, 2019; 6:30 pm		at Northwestern State	W 89–67	19–10 (13–4)	Prather Coliseum (702); Natchitoches, LA
Mar 9, 2019; 4:00 pm		Southeastern Louisiana	W 72–55	20–10 (14–4)	Stopher Gym (504); Thibodaux, LA
Southland Women's Tournament
Mar 15, 2019; 1:30 pm, ESPN+	(3)	vs. (6) Texas A&M–Corpus Christi; Second Round	L 56–69	20–11	Merrell Center (1,425); Katy, TX
WBI Tournament
Mar 21, 2019; 6:00 pm		at Southern Miss; First Round	L 71–77	20–12	Reed Green Coliseum (530); Hattiesburg, MS
*Non-conference game. ^{#}Rankings from AP Poll. (#) Tournament seedings in parentheses. All times are in Central Time.

== See also ==
- 2018–19 Nicholls Colonels men's basketball team
