= 2018–19 Sam Houston State Bearkats women's basketball team =

Intercollegiate basketball season

2018–19 Sam Houston State Bearkats women's basketball
- Conference: Southland Conference
- Record: 16–13 (11–7 Southland)
- Head coach: Ravon Justice (1st season)
- Assistant coaches: Anthony Anderson; Kira Carter; Brittany Mason
- Home arena: Bernard Johnson Coliseum (Capacity: 6,100)

2018–19 Southland Conference women's basketball standings
	Conf.				Overall
Team	W		L	PCT	W		L	PCT
Lamar	17	–	1	.944	24	–	7	.774
Stephen F. Austin	16	–	2	.889	25	–	7	.781
Nicholls	14	–	4	.778	20	–	12	.625
Abilene Christian †	13	–	5	.722	23	–	10	.697
Sam Houston State	11	–	7	.611	16	–	13	.552
Texas A&M–CC	8	–	10	.444	17	–	16	.515
New Orleans	8	–	10	.444	12	–	16	.429
Central Arkansas	6	–	12	.333	12	–	18	.400
Northwestern State	6	–	12	.333	11	–	18	.379
McNeese State	5	–	13	.278	7	–	22	.241
Incarnate Word	5	–	13	.278	5	–	24	.172
Houston Baptist	4	–	14	.222	9	–	19	.321
Southeastern Louisiana	4	–	14	.222	9	–	20	.310
† 2019 Southland tournament winner Rankings from AP poll

The 2018–19 Sam Houston State Bearkats women's basketball team represented Sam Houston State University during the 2018–19 NCAA Division I women's basketball season. The Bearkats, led by first year head coach Ravon Justice, played their home games at the Bernard Johnson Coliseum as members of the Southland Conference. They finished the season 16–13 overall, 11–7 in Southland play to finish in fifth place. As the No. 5 seed in the Southland women's tournament, they were defeated in the first round by Central Arkansas.

== Previous season ==
The Bearkats finished the 2017–18 season 4–23, 1–17 in Southland play to finish in thirteenth place. They failed to qualify for the Southland women's tournament.

On March 7, Welch-Nicholls agreed to part ways. She finished at Sam Houston State with a 12 year record of 119–234. On April 12, former Prairie View A&M head coach Ravon Justice was announced as her replacement.

== Roster ==
2018–19 Sam Houston State Bearkats women's basketball team
Players
Coaches

Pos.	#	Name	Height	Year	Previous school	Hometown
G	1	Jennifer Oramas	5 ft 5 in (1.65 m)	Jr	Charles W. Flannigan HS	Pembroke Pines, FL
F	2	Amber Leggett	5 ft 11 in (1.8 m)	Fr	Choctawhatchee HS	Navarre, FL
G	3	Alyssa Osborne	5 ft 6 in (1.68 m)	So	Oakridge HS	Spring, TX
G	5	Dominique Maxwell	5 ft 9 in (1.75 m)	Sr	St. Joseph HS; Odessa JC	Toronto, Canada
G	15	Tia Harston	5 ft 7 in (1.7 m)	Jr	Killeen HS	Killeen, TX
F	20	La'Sha Haynes	5 ft 10 in (1.78 m)	RS Sr	Port Gibson HS; Prairie View A&M	New Orleans, LA
F	21	Lydia Baxter	6 ft 0 in (1.83 m)	Sr	Bowie HS	Austin, TX
G	23	Jaylonn Walker	5 ft 7 in (1.7 m)	Jr	Calvert HS/McClennan CC	Calvert, TX
G	25	Faith Cook	5 ft 2 in (1.57 m)	RS Jr	Goose Creek HS; UTEP	Baytown, TX
G	34	Rachell Harrell	5 ft 9 in (1.75 m)	Jr	Brock HS	Weatherford, TX
C	35	Courtney Cook	6 ft 2 in (1.88 m)	Jr	Brennan HS; Incarnate Word/Tyler JC	San Antonio, TX
F	42	Kiera McKinney	6 ft 2 in (1.88 m)	Jr	Tascosa HS	Amarillo, TX
G		Destini Whitehead	5 ft 8 in (1.73 m)	Fr	Tenaha HS	Athens, TX

Head coach

- Ravon Justice (USAO)

Assistant coach(es)

- Anthony Anderson (FIU)
- Kira Carter (Coastal Carolina)
- Brittany Mason (Houston)

Legend

- (C) Team captain
- (S) Suspended
- (I) Ineligible
- (W) Walk-on
- Injured
- Current redshirt

Roster
Last update: September 11, 2018

== Schedule ==
Date time, TV	Rank^{#}	Opponent^{#}	Result	Record	Site (attendance) city, state
Non–conference games
Nov 6, 2018*; 5:30 pm		at LSU	L 52–66	0–1	Pete Maravich Assembly Center (1,891); Baton Rouge, LA
Nov 8, 2018*; 4:00 pm		Jarvis Christian	W 100–55	1–1	Bernard Johnson Coliseum (591); Huntsville, TX
Nov 14, 2018*; 6:30 pm		at Wichita State	L 55–63	1–2	Charles Koch Arena (1,357); Wichita, KS
Nov 19, 2018*; 6:30 pm		Wiley College	W 101–63	2–2	Bernard Johnson Coliseum (489); Huntsville, TX
Nov 23, 2018*; 4:00 pm		vs. Troy; Lady Eagle Thanksgiving Classic	L 79–84	2–3	Reed Green Coliseum (1,255); Hattiesburg, MS
Nov 24, 2018*; 4:00 pm		at Southern Miss; Lady Eagle Thanksgiving Classic	W 65–61	3–3	Reed Green Coliseum (1,180); Hattiesburg, MS
Dec 1, 2018*; 3:00 pm		St. Thomas	W 94–46	4–3	Bernard Johnson Coliseum (463); Huntsville, TX
Dec 8, 2018*; 2:00 pm		at Louisiana	W 68–62	5–3	Cajundome (1,124); Lafayette, LA
Dec 14, 2018*; 6:30 pm		Oral Roberts	L 62–73	5–4	Bernard Johnson Coliseum (425); Huntsville, TX
Dec 20, 2018*; 7:00 pm		at TCU	L 59–72	5–5	Schollmaier Arena (1,875); Fort Worth, TX
Southland Conference regular season
Jan 5, 2019; 3:00 pm		Abilene Christian	L 79–91	5–6 (0–1)	Bernard Johnson Coliseum (528); Huntsville, TX
Jan 9, 2019; 6:30 pm		Central Arkansas	W 66–62	6–6 (1–1)	Bernard Johnson Coliseum (428); Huntsville, TX
Jan 12, 2019; 1:00 pm		at Incarnate Word	W 76–56	7–6 (2–1)	McDermott Convocation Center (358); San Antonio, TX
Jan 16, 2019; 7:00 pm		at Texas A&M–Corpus Christi	L 61–76	7–7 (2–2)	Dugan Wellness Center (641); Corpus Christi, TX
Jan 19, 2019; 2:00 pm		at Houston Baptist	W 74–63	8–7 (3–2)	Sharp Gymnasium (427); Houston, TX
Jan 23, 2019; 6:30 pm		Northwestern State	W 66–55	9–7 (4–2)	Bernard Johnson Coliseum (693); Huntsville, TX
Jan 26, 2019; 3:00 pm		Lamar	L 72–83	9–8 (4–3)	Bernard Johnson Coliseum (881); Huntsville, TX
Jan 30, 2019; 6:30 pm		Southeastern Louisiana	W 94–63	10–8 (5–3)	Bernard Johnson Coliseum (609); Huntsville, TX
Feb 2, 2019; 3:00 pm		Stephen F. Austin	L 68–78	10–9 (5–4)	Bernard Johnson Coliseum (1,238); Huntsville, TX
Feb 6, 2019; 6:30 pm		at McNeese State	W 93–80	11–9 (6–4)	H&HP Complex (1,784); Lake Charles, LA
Feb 9, 2019; 1:00 pm		at Abilene Christian	W 72–63	12–9 (7–4)	Moody Coliseum (1,209); Abilene, TX
Feb 13, 2019; 6:30 pm		Texas A&M–Corpus Christi	W 61–59	13–9 (8–4)	Bernard Johnson Coliseum (735); Huntsville, TX
Feb 16, 2019; 2:00 pm, ESPN3		at Lamar	L 76–81	13–10 (8–5)	Montagne Center (2,855); Beaumont, TX
Feb 20, 2019; 6:00 pm		at Nicholls	L 81–84	13–11 (8–6)	Stopher Gym (414); Thibodaux, LA
Feb 23, 2019; 3:00 pm		Houston Baptist	W 83–64	14–11 (9–6)	Bernard Johnson Coliseum (964); Huntsville, TX
Feb 27, 2019; 6:30 pm		New Orleans	W 86–62	15–11 (10–6)	Bernard Johnson Coliseum (715); Huntsville, TX
Mar 6, 2019; 2:00 pm		at Central Arkansas	W 71–59	16–11 (11–6)	Farris Center (558); Conway, AR
Mar 9, 2019; 2:00 pm, ESPN3		at Stephen F. Austin	L 75–83	16–12 (11–7)	William R. Johnson Coliseum (3,611); Nacogdoches, TX
Southland Women's Tournament
March 14, 2019; 11:00 am, ESPN+	(5)	vs. (8) Central Arkansas; First Round	L 71–76	16–13	Merrell Center; Katy, TX
*Non-conference game. ^{#}Rankings from AP Poll. (#) Tournament seedings in parentheses. All times are in Central Time.

== See also ==
2018–19 Sam Houston State Bearkats men's basketball team
