= 2018–19 New Orleans Privateers women's basketball team =

Intercollegiate basketball season

2018–19 New Orleans Privateers women's basketball
- Conference: Southland Conference
- Record: 12–16 (8–10 Southland)
- Head coach: Keeshawn Davenport (8th season)
- Assistant coaches: Wyketha Harrell; Alpha English; Kristin Moore
- Home arena: Lakefront Arena

2018–19 Southland Conference women's basketball standings
	Conf.				Overall
Team	W		L	PCT	W		L	PCT
Lamar	17	–	1	.944	24	–	7	.774
Stephen F. Austin	16	–	2	.889	25	–	7	.781
Nicholls	14	–	4	.778	20	–	12	.625
Abilene Christian †	13	–	5	.722	23	–	10	.697
Sam Houston State	11	–	7	.611	16	–	13	.552
Texas A&M–CC	8	–	10	.444	17	–	16	.515
New Orleans	8	–	10	.444	12	–	16	.429
Central Arkansas	6	–	12	.333	12	–	18	.400
Northwestern State	6	–	12	.333	11	–	18	.379
McNeese State	5	–	13	.278	7	–	22	.241
Incarnate Word	5	–	13	.278	5	–	24	.172
Houston Baptist	4	–	14	.222	9	–	19	.321
Southeastern Louisiana	4	–	14	.222	9	–	20	.310
† 2019 Southland tournament winner Rankings from AP poll

The 2018–19 New Orleans Privateers women's basketball team represented the University of New Orleans during the 2018–19 NCAA Division I women's basketball season. The Privateers were led by eighth year head coach Keeshawn Davenport and played their home games at the Lakefront Arena. They are members of the Southland Conference.

== Previous season ==
The Privateers finished the 2017–18 season 15–15, 11–7 in Southland play to finish in a three-way tie for fourth place. They lost in the first round of the Southland women's tournament to Abilene Christian.

== Roster ==
2018–19 New Orleans Privateers women's basketball team
Players
Coaches

Pos.	#	Name	Height	Year	Previous school	Hometown
G	1	Jada Duncantell	5 ft 4 in (1.63 m)	So	Natchitoches Central HS	Natchitoches, LA
G	3	Rehema Franklin	5 ft 3 in (1.6 m)	Jr	Pearl River CC	Pearl River, LA
G	4	Vaqueia Pimpton	5 ft 8 in (1.73 m)	Jr	Holmes CC	Tallahatchie, MS
G	5	Traya Bruce	5 ft 7 in (1.7 m)	Fr	South LaFourche HS	Cut Off, LA
G	11	Annalise Brisco	5 ft 10 in (1.78 m)	So	Clear Falls HS	Houston, TX
C	13	Kayla Thomas	6 ft 5 in (1.96 m)	RS Jr	Mastery Charter HS; Central Florida	Philadelphia, PA
G	20	Jada Swafford	5 ft 10 in (1.78 m)	Jr	Union Academy HS	Alexandria, LA
F	22	Jana Thomas-Reid	6 ft 2 in (1.88 m)	Fr	Benjamin O Davis HS	Houston, TX
G	23	Dionjhae Thomas	5 ft 6 in (1.68 m)	RS So	Houma Christian HS	Thibodaux, LA
G	25	Alyssa Quixley	5 ft 9 in (1.75 m)	Jr	St. Augustine HS	St. Augustine, FL
C	30	Shania Woods	6 ft 1 in (1.85 m)	Sr	Lutheran HS	Houston, TX
F	31	Asia Woods	6 ft 0 in (1.83 m)	Jr	Lutheran HS	Houston, TX
F	32	Whitley Larry	6 ft 1 in (1.85 m)	Jr	Rayne HS	Rayne, LA
F	34	Kayla Malone	5 ft 11 in (1.8 m)	Jr	Pearl River CC	Oxford, MS

Head coach

- Keeshawn Davenport (New Orleans)

Assistant coach(es)

- Wyketha Harrell (UMKC)
- Alpha English (San José State)
- Kristin Moore (St. John's)

Legend

- (C) Team captain
- (S) Suspended
- (I) Ineligible
- (W) Walk-on
- Injured
- Current redshirt

Roster
Last update: August 25, 2018

== Schedule ==
Date time, TV	Rank^{#}	Opponent^{#}	Result	Record	Site (attendance) city, state
Exhibition
Nov 3, 2018*; 2:00 pm		West Alabama	W 84–64	–	Lakefront Arena (267); New Orleans, LA
Non-conference regular season
Nov 6, 2018*; 5:30 pm		Centenary	W 104–42	1–0	Lakefront Arena (267); New Orleans, LA
Nov 9, 2018*; 3:00 pm, ACC+		at Pittsburgh	L 38–90	1–1	Petersen Events Center (531); Pittsburgh, PA
Nov 17, 2018*; 7:00 pm		Trinity Baptist	W 93–38	2–1	Lakefront Arena (271); New Orleans, LA
Nov 25, 2018*; 2:00 pm		Louisiana–Monroe	L 44–57	2–2	Lakefront Arena (221); New Orleans, LA
Dec 1, 2018*; 2:00 pm		at Rice	L 56–67	2–3	Tudor Fieldhouse (1,621); Houston, TX
Dec 4, 2018*; 5:30 pm		at Memphis	W 66–59	3–3	Elma Roane Fieldhouse (412); Memphis, TN
Dec 9, 2018*; 12:00 pm, ACC+		at No. 25 Miami (FL)	L 38–78	3–4	BankUnited Center (766); Coral Gables, FL
December 14*; 11:00 am		Regent (VA)	W 68–59	4–4	Lakefront Arena (221); New Orleans, LA
Dec 22, 2018*; 11:00 am		at Xavier	L 45–61	4–5	Cintas Center (458); Cincinnati, OH
Southland regular season
Jan 2, 2019; 7:00 pm		Abilene Christian	L 52–59	4–6 (0–1)	Lakefront Arena (212); New Orleans, LA
Jan 5, 2019; 2:00 pm		at Houston Baptist	L 74–83	4–7 (0–2)	Sharp Gymnasium (314); Houston, TX
Jan 9, 2019; 7:00 pm		Lamar	L 57–79	4–8 (0–3)	Lakefront Arena (190); New Orleans, LA
Jan 12, 2019; 2:00 pm		McNeese State	W 88–76	5–8 (1–3)	Lakefront Arena (221); New Orleans, LA
Jan 16, 2019; 7:00 pm, ESPN+		at Stephen F. Austin	L 38–97	5–9 (1–4)	William R. Johnson Coliseum (1,088); Nacogdoches, TX
Jan 19, 2019; 2:30 pm, ESPN3		at Texas A&M–Corpus Christi	L 51–57	5–10 (1–5)	American Bank Center (1,215); Corpus Christi, TX
Jan 23, 2019; 7:00 pm		Central Arkansas	L 60–62	5–11 (1–6)	Lakefront Arena (232); New Orleans, LA
Jan 26, 2019; 12:15 pm		at Incarnate Word	L 69–81	5–12 (1–7)	McDermott Convocation Center; San Antonio, TX
Jan 30, 2019; 7:00 pm		at Northwestern State	W 67–62	6–12 (2–7)	Prather Coliseum (615); Natchitoches, LA
Feb 2, 2019; 2:00 pm		Incarnate Word	W 58–55	7–12 (3–7)	Lakefront Arena (240); New Orleans, LA
Feb 6, 2019; 7:00 pm		Northwestern State	W 84–73	8–12 (4–7)	Lakefront Arena (259); New Orleans, LA
Feb 9, 2019; 2:00 pm		Nicholls; Homecomming	L 62–76	8–13 (4–8)	Lakefront Arena (344); New Orleans, LA
Feb 16, 2019; 2:00 pm		Texas A&M–Corpus Christi	W 56–54	9–13 (5–8)	Lakefront Arena (363); New Orleans, LA
Feb 20, 2019; 7:00 pm		at Southeastern Louisiana	W 61–58	10–13 (6–8)	University Center (703); Hammond, LA
Feb 23, 2019; 1:00 pm		at McNeese State	W 64–60	11–13 (7–8)	H&HP Complex (1,905); Lake Charles, LA
Feb 27, 2019; 6:30 pm		at Sam Houston State	L 62–86	11–14 (7–9)	Bernard G. Johnson Coliseum (715); Huntsville, TX
Mar 2, 2019; 1:00 pm		at Nicholls State	L 58–66	11–15 (7–10)	Stopher Gym (411); Thibodaux, LA
Mar 6, 2019; 7:00 pm		Southeastern Louisiana	W 46–45	12–15 (8–10)	Lakefront Arena (315); New Orleans, LA
Southland Women's Tournament
Mar 13, 2019; 1:30 pm, ESPN+	(7)	vs. (6) Texas A&M–Corpus Christi; First Round	L 47–69	12–16	Merrell Center (946); Katy, TX
*Non-conference game. ^{#}Rankings from AP Poll. (#) Tournament seedings in parentheses. All times are in Central Time.

== See also ==
2018–19 New Orleans Privateers men's basketball team
