= 2018–19 Lamar Lady Cardinals basketball team =

Intercollegiate basketball season

2018–19 Lamar Lady Cardinals basketball

Southland regular season champions

Women's National Invitation Tournament, First round
- Conference: Southland Conference
- Record: 24–7 (17–1 Southland)
- Head coach: Robin Harmony (6th season)
- Assistant coaches: Randy Schneider (6th season); Hana Haden (2nd season); Cameron Miles (3rd season)
- Home arena: Montagne Center (Capacity: 10,080)

2018–19 Southland Conference women's basketball standings
	Conf.				Overall
Team	W		L	PCT	W		L	PCT
Lamar	17	–	1	.944	24	–	7	.774
Stephen F. Austin	16	–	2	.889	25	–	7	.781
Nicholls	14	–	4	.778	20	–	12	.625
Abilene Christian †	13	–	5	.722	23	–	10	.697
Sam Houston State	11	–	7	.611	16	–	13	.552
Texas A&M–CC	8	–	10	.444	17	–	16	.515
New Orleans	8	–	10	.444	12	–	16	.429
Central Arkansas	6	–	12	.333	12	–	18	.400
Northwestern State	6	–	12	.333	11	–	18	.379
McNeese State	5	–	13	.278	7	–	22	.241
Incarnate Word	5	–	13	.278	5	–	24	.172
Houston Baptist	4	–	14	.222	9	–	19	.321
Southeastern Louisiana	4	–	14	.222	9	–	20	.310
† 2019 Southland tournament winner Rankings from AP poll

The 2018–19 Lamar Lady Cardinals basketball team represented Lamar University during the 2018–19 NCAA Division I women's basketball season. The Lady Cardinals, led by sixth year head coach Robin Harmony, played their home games at the Montagne Center as members of the Southland Conference.The Lady Cardinals finished the 2018–19 season with an overall record of 24-7. They won the Southland Conference regular season championship were 17-1 in Southland play. After losing to Abilene Christian in the Southland Conference tournament semi-final game 79-88, the Lady Cardinals were an automatic qualifier to the WNIT. Their season ended with a first round 71-73 loss to the South Alabama in the first round. The loss ended a 42 home court win streak which started on November 16, 2016. Chastadie Barrs set the NCAA Division I steals record in the WNIT game at 192. She had tied the steals record of 191 the previous season.

== Previous season ==
The Lady Cardinals finished the 2017–18 season with an overall record of 22-8. They won the Southland Conference regular season championship were 17-1 in Southland play. After losing to Nicholls State in a Southland Conference tournament semi-final game 68-74, the Lady Cardinals were an automatic qualifier to the WNIT. Their season ended with a first round 68-80 loss to the TCU in the first round.

== Roster ==
2018–19 Lamar Lady Cardinals women's basketball team
Players
Coaches

Pos.	#	Name	Height	Year	Previous school	Hometown
G	1	Jadyn Pimentel	5 ft 5 in (1.65 m)	So	Parkway North HS	St. Louis, MO
G	2	Angel Hastings	5 ft 6 in (1.68 m)	Fr	Wagner HS	San Antonio, TX
F	3	Kyla Green	5 ft 10 in (1.78 m)	Jr	Overton HS	Memphis, TN
C	4	Briana Laidler	6 ft 1 in (1.85 m)	Jr	Spruce Creek HS	Port Orange, FL
G	5	Amber Vidal (redshirt)	5 ft 6 in (1.68 m)	Sr	O'Conner HS; Nebraska–Omaha	San Antonio, TX
G	10	Chastadie Barrs	5 ft 8 in (1.73 m)	Sr	DeSoto HS	DeSoto, TX
G	13	Shedricka Pierson	5 ft 9 in (1.75 m)	So	Brusly HS	Brusly, LA
G	15	DeJa Roberts	5 ft 7 in (1.7 m)	Sr	Nova HS	Davie, FL
C	20	Rikiah Cowart	6 ft 2 in (1.88 m)	So	Nova HS	Lauderhill, FL
F	22	Miya Crump	6 ft 1 in (1.85 m)	Fr	Yates HS	Houston, TX
G	23	Moe Kinard	5 ft 9 in (1.75 m)	RS Sr	New Iberia HS; Houston	New Iberia, LA
G	24	Ashlan Miles	5 ft 9 in (1.75 m)	Jr	Dallas Christian HS	Dallas, TX
C	32	Umaja Collins	6 ft 2 in (1.88 m)	Fr	Mesquite Horn HS	Mesquite, TX

Head coach

- Robin Harmony (Miami (FL))

Assistant coach(es)

- Randy Schneider (FIU)
- Hana Haden (Harris–Stowe State)
- Cameron Miles (San Diego)

Legend

- (C) Team captain
- (S) Suspended
- (I) Ineligible
- (W) Walk-on
- Injured
- Current redshirt

Roster
Last update: September 13, 2018

== Schedule ==
Date time, TV	Rank^{#}	Opponent^{#}	Result	Record	High points	High rebounds	High assists	Site (attendance) city, state
Non-Conference schedule
Nov 6, 2018*; 5:00 pm, ESPN+		at Louisiana	W 79–77 ^{OT}	1–0	23 – Barrs	8 – Crump	4 – Barrs	Cajundome (1,059); Lafayette, LA
Nov 10, 2018*; 7:30 pm, ESPN+		McMurry	W 100–37	2–0	21 – Crump	9 – Laidler	6 – Barrs	Montagne Center (1,263); Beaumont, TX
Nov 12, 2018*; 7:00 pm, ESPN+		Louisiana College	W 94–43	3–0	31 – Kinard	9 – Kinard	5 – 2 tied	Montagne Center (856); Beaumont, TX
Nov 15, 2018*; 7:00 pm, SECN		at No. 6 Mississippi State	L 53–104	3–1	16 – Barrs	5 – Kinard	2 – 2 tied	Humphrey Coliseum (7,107); Starkville, MS
Nov 20, 2018*; 7:00 pm, ESPN+		LeTourneau	W 104–27	4–1	22 – Bracy	6 – Laidler	6 – Hastings	Montagne Center (862); Beaumont, TX
Nov 23, 2018*; 4:30 pm		at Denver; Denver Thanksgiving Classic	L 110–117 ^{2OT}	4–2	58 – Kinard	11 – Barrs	8 – Barrs	Hamilton Gymnasium (370); Denver, CO
Nov 24, 2018*; 2:00 pm		vs. Ohio; Denver Thanksgiving Classic	L 62–87	4–3	20 – Barrs	8 – Barrs	2 – 2 tied	Hamilton Gymnasium; Denver, CO
Nov 29, 2018*; 11:00 am, SECN		at No. 17 Texas A&M	W 74–68	5–3	23 – Barrs	7 – 2 tied	4 – Barrs	Reed Arena (7,133); College Station, TX
Dec 5, 2018*; 7:00 pm, FCS Central		at Kansas State	L 55–73	5–4	19 – Crump	10 – Barrs	4 – Barrs	Bramlage Coliseum (2,683); Manhattan, KS
Dec 17, 2018*; 12:00 pm, ESPN3		Howard Payne	W 93–37	6–4	20 – Barrs	12 – Barrs	6 – Barrs	Montagne Center (4,213); Beaumont, TX
Dec 20, 2018*; 7:00 pm, ESPN3		Pacific	W 82–66	7–4	23 – 2 tied	10 – Barrs	8 – Barrs	Montagne Center (933); Beaumont, TX
Conference schedule
Jan 2, 2019; 7:00 pm, ESPN+		Houston Baptist	W 63–50	8–4 (1–0)	18 – Crump	7 – Crump	8 – Barrs	Montagne Center (939); Beaumont, TX
Jan 5, 2019; 2:00 pm, ESPN3		Texas A&M–Corpus Christi	W 76–58	9–4 (2–0)	25 – Kinard	6 – Crump	9 – Barrs	Montagne Center (2,628); Beaumont, TX
Jan 9, 2019; 7:00 pm		at New Orleans	W 79–57	10–4 (3–0)	29 – Kinard	10 – Barrs	9 – Barrs	Lakefront Arena (190); New Orleans, LA
Jan 12, 2019; 2:00 pm, ESPN3		Central Arkansas	W 57–37	11–4 (4–0)	18 – Kinard	11 – Barrs	10 – Barrs	Montagne Center (1,220); Beaumont, TX
Jan 16, 2019; 7:00 pm, ESPN+		Southeastern Louisiana	W 94–54	12–4 (5–0)	31 – Crump	10 – Barrs	11 – Barrs	Montagne Center (952); Beaumont, TX
Jan 23, 2019; 6:30 pm		at Incarnate Word	W 77–51	13–4 (6–0)	23 – Barrs	13 – Laidler	6 – Barrs	McDermott Convocation Center (344); San Antonio, TX
Jan 26, 2019; 3:00 pm, ESPN3		at Sam Houston State	W 83–72	14–4 (7–0)	29 – Kinard	7 – 2 tied	7 – Barrs	Bernard G. Johnson Coliseum (881); Huntsville, TX
Jan 30, 2019; 7:00 pm, ESPN+		Nicholls	W 78–65	15–4 (8–0)	22 – Crump	7 – Kinard	5 – Barrs	Montagne Center (1,411); Beaumont, TX
Feb 2, 2019; 1:00 pm		at McNeese State	W 64–62	16–4 (9–0)	22 – Kinard	7 – Crump	3 – 2 tied	H&HP Complex (2,201); Lake Charles, LA
Feb 6, 2019; 7:00 pm, ESPN+		at Abilene Christian	W 63–60	17–4 (10–0)	18 – Kinard	7 – 2 tied	7 – Barrs	Moody Coliseum (1,129); Abilene, TX
Feb 9, 2019; 2:00 pm, ESPN3		at Stephen F. Austin	L 58–70	17–5 (10–1)	23 – Moe	8 – Moe	2 – 2 tied	William R. Johnson Coliseum (4,676); Nacogdoches, TX
Feb 13, 2019; 6:30 pm		at Northwestern State	W 94–70	18–5 (11–1)	31 – Kinard	17 – Collins	7 – Barrs	Prather Coliseum (787); Natchitoches, LA
Feb 16, 2019; 2:00 pm, ESPN3		Sam Houston State	W 81–76	19–5 (12–1)	22 – Crump	8 – 2 tied	7 – Bars	Montagne Center (2,855); Beaumont, TX
Feb 20, 2019; 7:00 pm, ESPN+		Incarnate Word	W 79–53	20–5 (13–1)	16 – Barrs	10 – Collins	7 – Barrs	Montagne Center (1,150); Beaumont, TX
Feb 23, 2019; 1:00 pm		at Texas A&M–Corpus Christi	W 72–47	21–5 (14–1)	16 – Kinard	17 – Barrs	6 – Barrs	American Bank Center (1,079); Corpus Christi, TX
Feb 27, 2019; 7:00 pm		at Houston Baptist	W 97–49	22–5 (15–1)	31 – Kinard	8 – Kinard	9 – Barrs	Sharp Gymnasium (319); Houston, TX
Mar 2, 2019; 2:00 pm, ESPN3		Stephen F. Austin	W 62–46	23–5 (16–1)	23 – Kinard	10 – Barrs	9 – Barrs	Montagne Center (3,551); Beaumont, TX
Mar 9, 2019; 2:00 pm, ESPN+		McNeese State	W 81–68	24–5 (17–1)	34 – Kinard	8 – Crump	13 – Barrs	Montagne Center (5,218); Beaumont, TX
Southland Tournament
Mar 16, 2019; 1:00 pm, ESPN+	(1)	vs. (4) Abilene Christian; Semifinals	L 79–88	24–6	34 – Kinard	8 – Collins	10 – Barrs	Merrell Center (1,725); Katy, TX
NIT Tournament
Mar 22, 2019*; 7:00 pm		South Alabama; First round	L 71–73	24–7	36 – Kinard	9 – Laidler	6 – Barrs	Montagne Center (1,829); Beaumont, TX
*Non-conference game. ^{#}Rankings from AP Poll. (#) Tournament seedings in parentheses. All times are in Central Time.

== See also ==
2018–19 Lamar Cardinals basketball team
