= Kacie Cryer =

American basketball coach

Current position
- Title: Assistant coach
- Team: Louisiana
- Conference: Sun Belt Conference

Biographical details
- Born: Abbeville, Louisiana

Playing career
- 2004–2008: LSU–Shreveport
- Position: Forward

Coaching career (HC unless noted)
- 2008–2010: McNeese State (graduate assistant)
- 2011–2016: McNeese State (asst.)
- 2016–2021: McNeese State
- 2021–2022: Houston Baptist (asst.)
- 2025–present: Louisiana (asst.)

Head coaching record
- Overall: 44–97 (.312)

Kacie Cryer is an American college basketball coach, currently serving as an assistant coach for the Louisiana Ragin' Cajuns women's basketball team.

Cryer was formerly the assistant head coach at Houston Baptist and head coach of McNeese State women's basketball team from 2016 to 2021. Before being named head coach, Cryer served for eight seasons on Donald-Williams's staff at McNeese State as an assistant, helping lead the program to two NCAA tournament appearances. She earned a bachelor's degree in general studies from Louisiana State University in Shreveport in 2008 and her master's degree in instructional technology from McNeese State in 2012.

== Coaching career ==
=== McNeese State ===
On April 8, 2016, Cryer was announced as the new head coach of the McNeese State women's basketball program.

On March 12, 2021, Cryer's contract was not renewed by McNeese State after leading the Cowboys to a sixth straight losing season.

=== Houston Baptist ===
On August 2, 2021, Cryer was named an assistant coach for the Houston Baptist Huskies women's basketball team.

== Head coaching record ==
=== College ===
Record table
Season	Team	Overall	Conference	Standing	Postseason
McNeese State (Southland Conference) (2016–2021)
2016–17	McNeese State	14–17	8–10	T–5th	
2017–18	McNeese State	12–18	8–10	6th	
2018–19	McNeese State	7–22	5–13	T–8th	
2019–20	McNeese State	5–24	2–18	9th	
2020–21	McNeese State	6–16	6–8	8th	
McNeese State:		44–97 (.312)	32–59 (.352)		
Total:		44–97 (.312)			
National champion Postseason invitational champion Conference regular season champion Conference regular season and conference tournament champion Division regular season champion Division regular season and conference tournament champion Conference tournament champion
