= 2018–19 Southeastern Louisiana Lady Lions basketball team =

Intercollegiate basketball season

2018–19 Southeastern Louisiana Lady Lions basketball
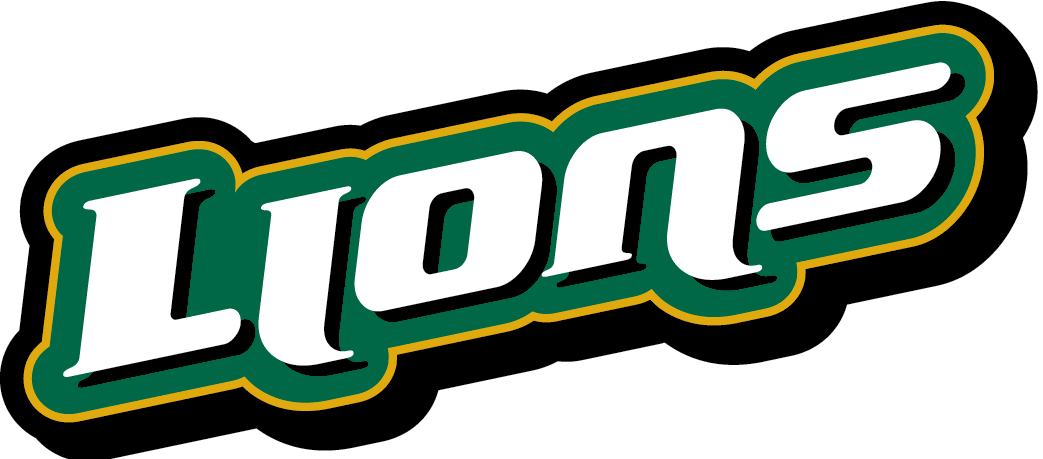
- Conference: Southland Conference
- Record: 9–20 (4–14 Southland)
- Head coach: Ayla Guzzardo (2nd season)
- Assistant coaches: Kenneth Lee Jr.; Aja Ochie; Chelsie Butler
- Home arena: University Center (Capacity: 7,500)

2018–19 Southland Conference women's basketball standings
	Conf.				Overall
Team	W		L	PCT	W		L	PCT
Lamar	17	–	1	.944	24	–	7	.774
Stephen F. Austin	16	–	2	.889	25	–	7	.781
Nicholls	14	–	4	.778	20	–	12	.625
Abilene Christian †	13	–	5	.722	23	–	10	.697
Sam Houston State	11	–	7	.611	16	–	13	.552
Texas A&M–CC	8	–	10	.444	17	–	16	.515
New Orleans	8	–	10	.444	12	–	16	.429
Central Arkansas	6	–	12	.333	12	–	18	.400
Northwestern State	6	–	12	.333	11	–	18	.379
McNeese State	5	–	13	.278	7	–	22	.241
Incarnate Word	5	–	13	.278	5	–	24	.172
Houston Baptist	4	–	14	.222	9	–	19	.321
Southeastern Louisiana	4	–	14	.222	9	–	20	.310
† 2019 Southland tournament winner Rankings from AP poll

The 2018–19 Southeastern Louisiana Lady Lions basketball team represented Southeastern Louisiana University during the 2018–19 NCAA Division I women's basketball season. The Lady Lions were led by second-year head coach Ayla Guzzardo, and played their home games at the University Center in Hammond, Louisiana as members of the Southland Conference. They finished the season 9–20, 4–14 in Southland play, to finish in a tie for last place. They failed to qualify for the Southland women's tournament.

== Previous season ==
The Lady Lions finished the 2017–18 season with an 8–21 overall record and a 7–11 record in Southland play to finish in ninth place. They failed to qualify for the Southland women's tournament.

== Roster ==
2018–19 Southeastern Louisiana Lions women's basketball team
Players
Coaches

Pos.	#	Name	Height	Year	Previous school	Hometown
F	0	Kyla Williams	5 ft 11 in (1.8 m)	Sr	Cabrini HS; Hutchinson CC	New Orleans, LA
G/F	3	Morgan Carrier	5 ft 9 in (1.75 m)	So	New Iberia HS	New Iberia, LA
G	5	Charliee Dugas	5 ft 8 in (1.73 m)	Jr	Rayne HS	Rayne, LA
F	11	Sydney Rivers	6 ft 1 in (1.85 m)	Fr	Loranger HS	Loranger, LA
F	12	Jyar Francis	6 ft 1 in (1.85 m)	Sr	Ponchatoula HS; Wichita State	Ponchatoula, LA
G	13	Rhomyia Tate	5 ft 3 in (1.6 m)	Sr	Ponchatoula HS; Baton Rouge CC	Tickfaw, LA
F	15	Lauren Bush	5 ft 9 in (1.75 m)	So	Lusher HS	New Orleans, LA
G	20	Celica Sterling	5 ft 8 in (1.73 m)	Jr	Scotlandville HS; Baton Rouge CC	Baton Rouge, LA
G	23	Jaclyn Scovin	5 ft 7 in (1.7 m)	Sr	Fontainebleau HS	Mandeville, LA
G	24	Tyler Morrison	5 ft 8 in (1.73 m)	Jr	St. Michael HS	Baton Rouge, LA
F	25	Caitlyn Williams	6 ft 0 in (1.83 m)	So	Brusly HS	Brusly, LA
G	30	Ashailee Brailey	5 ft 8 in (1.73 m)	Sr	Vermillion Catholic HS; Jones County JC	Abbeville, LA
C	33	Aminat Jubril	6 ft 2 in (1.88 m)	Jr	New Era Girls Secondary School; Pensacola State College	Lagos, Nigeria

Head coach

- Ayla Guzzardo (Akron)

Assistant coach(es)

- Kenneth Lee Jr. (Nicholls State)
- Aja Ochie (Southeastern Louisiana)
- Chelsie Butler (Marquette)

Legend

- (C) Team captain
- (S) Suspended
- (I) Ineligible
- (W) Walk-on
- Injured
- Current redshirt

Roster
Last update: September 10, 2025

== Schedule ==
Date time, TV	Rank^{#}	Opponent^{#}	Result	Record	Site (attendance) city, state
Non-conference regular season
November 7, 2018*; 7:00 p.m., SECN+		at Alabama	L 40–88	0–1	Coleman Coliseum (1,938); Tuscaloosa, AL
November 12, 2018*; 6:00 p.m.		Mobile	W 70–57	1–1	University Center (602); Hammond, LA
November 15, 2018*; 5:30 p.m.		at Alcorn State	W 77–59	2–1	Davey Whitney Complex (159); Lorman, MS
November 20, 2018; 7:00 p.m.		at SMU	W 63–62	3–1	Moody Coliseum (566); Dallas, TX
November 27, 2018*; 6:00 p.m.		at Jackson State	W 50–45	4–1	Williams Assembly Center (353); Jackson, MS
November 30, 2018*; 6:00 p.m.		Xavier (LA)	L 47–59	4–2	University Center (526); Hammond, LA
December 12, 2018*; 6:30 p.m., CUSA-TV		at Louisiana Tech	L 53–72	4–3	Thomas Assembly Center (1,154); Ruston, LA
December 15, 2018*; 3:00 p.m.		at Alabama A&M	L 48–51	4–4	Elmore Gymnasium (211); Normal, AL
December 17, 2018*; 5:30 p.m.		Louisiana–Monroe	W 49–42	5–4	University Center (521); Hammond, LA
December 20, 2018*; 6:00 p.m.		at Southern Miss	L 52–59	5–5	Reed Green Coliseum (463); Hattiesburg, MS
December 27, 2018*; 6:30 p.m., SEC+		at LSU	L 52–72	5–6	Pete Maravich Assembly Center (1,654); Baton Rouge, LA
Southland Conference regular season
January 2, 2019; 7:00 p.m.		Stephen F. Austin	L 51–62	5–7 (0–1)	University Center (487); Hammond, LA
January 5, 2019; 1:00 p.m.		Central Arkansas	W 62–53	6–7 (1–1)	University Center (521); Hammond, LA
January 12, 2019; 1:00 p.m.		Abilene Christian	W 74–71	7–7 (2–1)	University Center (502); Hammond, LA
January 16, 2019; 7:00 p.m., ESPN+		at Lamar	L 54–94	7–8 (2–2)	Montagne Center (952); Beaumont, TX
January 19, 2019; 11:00 a.m.		at McNeese State	L 56–62	7–9 (2–3)	H&HP Complex; Lake Charles, LA
January 23, 2019; 7:00 p.m.		Houston Baptist	W 73–65	8–9 (3–3)	University Center (637); Hammond, LA
January 26, 2019; 1:00 p.m.		at Northwestern State	L 47–58	8–10 (3–4)	Prather Coliseum (801); Natchitoches, LA
January 30, 2019; 6:30 p.m., ESPN+		at Sam Houston State	L 63–94	8–11 (3–5)	Bernard G. Johnson Coliseum (609); Huntsville, TX
February 2, 2019; 1:00 p.m., ESPN3		Nicholls State	L 66–73	8–12 (3–6)	University Center (635); Hammond, LA
February 6, 2019; 7:00 p.m.		Texas A&M–Corpus Christi	W 56–45	9–12 (4–6)	University Center (529); Hammond, LA
February 9, 2019; 2:00 p.m.		at Central Arkansas	L 33–75	9–13 (4–7)	Farris Center (1,825); Conway, AR
February 13, 2019; 6:30 p.m.		at Incarnate Word	L 69–76	9–14 (4–8)	McDermott Convocation Center (274); San Antonio, TX
February 16, 2019; 1:00 p.m.		McNeese State	L 70–75	9–15 (4–9)	University Center (555); Hammond, LA
February 20, 2019; 7:00 p.m.		New Orleans	L 58–61	9–16 (4–10)	University Center (703); Hammond, LA
February 23, 2019; 1:00 p.m., ESPN3		at Abilene Christian	L 58–61	9–17 (4–11)	Moody Coliseum (703); Abilene, TX
March 2, 2019; 1:00 p.m.		Northwestern State	L 56–60 ^{2OT}	9–18 (4–12)	University Center (609); Hammond, LA
March 6, 2019; 7:00 p.m.		at New Orleans	L 45–46	9–19 (4–13)	Lakefront Arena (315); New Orleans, LA
March 9, 2019; 1:00 p.m.		at Nicholls	L 55–72	9–20 (4–14)	Stopher Gym (504); Thibodaux, LA
*Non-conference game. ^{#}Rankings from AP poll. (#) Tournament seedings in parentheses. All times are in Central.

== See also ==
- 2018–19 Southeastern Louisiana Lions basketball team
