= 2018–19 Incarnate Word Cardinals women's basketball team =

Intercollegiate basketball season

2018–19 Incarnate Word Cardinals women's basketball
- Conference: Southland Conference
- Record: 5–24 (5–13 Southland)
- Head coach: Christy Smith (3rd season)
- Assistant coaches: Betsy Adams; John Clark; Marvin Walker
- Home arena: McDermott Center (Capacity: 2,000)

2018–19 Southland Conference women's basketball standings
	Conf.				Overall
Team	W		L	PCT	W		L	PCT
Lamar	17	–	1	.944	24	–	7	.774
Stephen F. Austin	16	–	2	.889	25	–	7	.781
Nicholls	14	–	4	.778	20	–	12	.625
Abilene Christian †	13	–	5	.722	23	–	10	.697
Sam Houston State	11	–	7	.611	16	–	13	.552
Texas A&M–CC	8	–	10	.444	17	–	16	.515
New Orleans	8	–	10	.444	12	–	16	.429
Central Arkansas	6	–	12	.333	12	–	18	.400
Northwestern State	6	–	12	.333	11	–	18	.379
McNeese State	5	–	13	.278	7	–	22	.241
Incarnate Word	5	–	13	.278	5	–	24	.172
Houston Baptist	4	–	14	.222	9	–	19	.321
Southeastern Louisiana	4	–	14	.222	9	–	20	.310
† 2019 Southland tournament winner Rankings from AP poll

The 2018–19 Incarnate Word Cardinals women's basketball team represented the University of the Incarnate Word in the 2018-19 NCAA Division I women's basketball season. They were led by coach Christy Smith, in her third season. They finished the season 5–24, 5–13 in Southland play to finish in a tie for tenth place. They failed to qualify for the Southland women's tournament.

On March 10, Christy Smith's contract was not renewed. She finished with a 3 year record of 21–68.

== Previous season ==
The Cardinals finished the 2017–18 season 5–24, 4–14 in Southland play to finish in eleventh place. They failed to qualify for the Southland women's tournament.

== Roster ==
2018–19 Incarnate Word Cardinals women's basketball team
Players
Coaches

Pos.	#	Name	Height	Year	Previous school	Hometown
G	3	Alexandra Busby-Leija	5 ft 8 in (1.73 m)	Jr	Southwest HS	San Antonio, TX
G	4	Gabbi Bowie	5 ft 8 in (1.73 m)	RS Sr	Johnson HS; University of Utah	San Antonio, TX
SG	5	Kara Speer	5 ft 9 in (1.75 m)	So	Metro Christian Academy	Tulsa, OK
G	11	Imani Robinson	5 ft 11 in (1.8 m)	Jr	Cedar Ridge HS	Round Rock, TX
F	20	Charmaine McBride	5 ft 9 in (1.75 m)	Jr	Vista Ridge HS	Cedar Park, TX
G	22	Liz Holter	5 ft 9 in (1.75 m)	So	Seton Catholic Prep	Gilbert, AZ
C	24	Quincy Baker	6 ft 2 in (1.88 m)	RS Sr	Klein HS	Houston, TX
F	32	Olivia Noah	6 ft 1 in (1.85 m)	So	Cy-Fair HS	Cypress, TX
F	33	Kandyce Shepard	6 ft 2 in (1.88 m)	Fr	Westwood HS	Round Rock, TX

Head coach

Christy Smith

Assistant coach(es)

Betsy Adams
John Clark
Marvin Walker

Legend

- (C) Team captain
- (S) Suspended
- (I) Ineligible
- (W) Walk-on
- Injured
- Current redshirt

Roster
Last update: January 17, 2018

== Schedule ==
Date time, TV	Opponent	Result	Record	High points	High rebounds	High assists	Site (attendance) city, state
Non-conference regular season
Nov 6, 2018*; 9:30 pm	at Arizona State	L 43–81	0–1	7 – 2 tied	8 – Henry	2 – 2 tied	Wells Fargo Arena (2,221); Tempe, AZ
Nov 9, 2018*; 7:00 pm	at Grand Canyon	L 63–74	0–2	17 – Robinson	15 – Omozee	1 – 4 tied	GCU Arena (958); Phoenix, AZ
Nov 11, 2018*; 3:15 pm, Midco SN	at South Dakota	L 43–96	0–3	11 – Henry	5 – Omozee	2 – Robinson	Sanford Coyote Sports Center (1,799); Vermillion, SD
Nov 16, 2018*; 11:30 am	Houston	L 60–79	0–4	19 – Omozee	10 – Omozee	5 – Robinson	McDermott Convocation Center (404); San Antonio, TX
Nov 18, 2018*; 3:00 pm, MTN	at San Diego State	L 38–81	0–5	8 – Henry	7 – Henry	1 – 6 tied	Viejas Arena (1,477); San Diego, CA
Nov 21, 2018*; 5:00 pm	Weber State	L 64–72	0–6	19 – Wiggins	10 – Omozee	4 – Tied	McDermott Convocation Center (432); San Antonio, TX
Nov 27, 2018*; 7:30 pm	at Arizona	L 42–84	0–7	11 – Wiggins	5 – Tied	3 – Bowie	McKale Center (1,059); Tucson, AZ
Dec 2, 2018*; 2:00 pm	UT Arlington	L 49–97	0–8	15 – Noah	9 – Henry	3 – Tied	McDermott Convocation Center (349); San Antonio, TX
Dec 5, 2018*; 12:00 pm, BTN+	at No. 14 Minnesota	L 39–75	0–9	13 – Wiggins	6 – Omozee	3 – Robinson	Williams Arena (7,835); Minneapolis, MN
Dec 7, 2018*; 8:00 pm	at UMass	L 59–71	0–10	21 – Wiggins	4 – Robinson	3 – 2 tied	Mullins Center (555); Amherst, MA
Dec 29, 2018*; 1:00 pm	Rice	L 63–74	0–11	16 – Robinson	5 – Robinson	9 – Ray	McDermott Convocation Center (247); San Antonio, TX
Southland regular season
Jan 2, 2019; 6:30 pm	at McNeese State	W 68–66	1–11 (1–0)	16 – Wiggins	11 – Henry	2 – 4 tied	H&HP Complex (1,639); Lake Charles, LA
Jan 5, 2019; 1:00 pm	at Nicholls State	L 62–86	1–12 (1–1)	16 – Robinson	8 – Henry	3 – Omozee	Stopher Gym (161); Thibodaux, LA
Jan 12, 2019; 1:00 pm	Sam Houston State	L 56–76	1–13 (1–2)	10 – 2 tied	6 – Henry	4 – Robinson	McDermott Convocation Center (358); San Antonio, TX
Jan 16, 2019; 7:00 pm	at Central Arkansas	L 43–74	1–14 (1–3)	13 – 2 tied	9 – Omozee	1 – 4 tied	Farris Center (327); Conway, AR
Jan 19, 2019; 1:00 pm, ESPN3	Stephen F. Austin	L 56–66	1–15 (1–4)	13 – Speer	7 – Omozee	5 – Omozee	McDermott Convocation Center (854); San Antonio, TX
Jan 23, 2019; 6:30 pm	Lamar	L 51–77	1–16 (1–5)	11 – Omozee	10 – Omozee	4 – Bowie	McDermott Convocation Center (344); San Antonio, TX
Jan 26, 2019; 12:15 pm	New Orleans	W 81–69	2–16 (2–5)	26 – Robinson	6 – 2 tied	7 – Bowie	McDermott Convocation Center; San Antonio, TX
Jan 30, 2019; 7:00 pm	at Houston Baptist	L 59–60	2–17 (2–6)	18 – Omozee	9 – 2 tied	4 – Robinson	Sharp Gymnasium (327); Houston, TX
Feb 2, 2019; 2:00 pm	at New Orleans	L 55–58	2–18 (2–7)	18 – Omozee	9 – Omozee	2 – 3 tied	Lakefront Arena (240); New Orleans, LA
Feb 9, 2019; 3:00 pm	at Texas A&M–Corpus Christi	L 49–57	2–19 (2–8)	10 – Omozee	6 – Henry	2 – 2 tied	American Bank Center (811); Corpus Christi, TX
Feb 13, 2019; 6:30 pm	Southeastern Louisiana	W 76–69	3–19 (3–8)	17 – Bowie	8 – 2 tied	5 – Bowie	McDermott Convocation Center (274); San Antonio, TX
Feb 16, 2019; 1:00 pm	Abilene Christian	L 50–71	3–20 (3–9)	12 – Holter	6 – Speer	3 – 2 tied	McDermott Convocation Center; San Antonio, TX
Feb 20, 2019; 7:00 pm, ESPN+	at Lamar	L 53–79	3–21 (3–10)	12 – Noah	11 – Speer	2 – 4 tied	Montagne Center (1,150); Beaumont, TX
Feb 23, 2019; 2:00 pm, ESPN3	at Stephen F. Austin	L 48–65	3–22 (3–11)	15 – Robinson	10 – Robinson	2 – 2 tied	William R. Johnson Coliseum (2,684); Nacogdoches, TX
Feb 27, 2019; 6:30 pm	Northwestern State	W 100–91	4–22 (4–11)	28 – Wiggins	6 – Henry	9 – Bowie	McDermott Convocation Center (511); San Antonio, TX
Mar 2, 2019; 1:00 pm	Texas A&M–Corpus Christi	W 77–72	5–22 (5–11)	17 – 2 tied	7 – Speer	4 – Robinson	McDermott Convocation Center (488); San Antonio, TX
Mar 6, 2019; 6:30 pm	Houston Baptist	L 52–67	5–23 (5–12)	12 – Henry	11 – Robinson	5 – Bowie	McDermott Convocation Center (339); San Antonio, TX
Mar 9, 2019; 1:00 pm	at Abilene Christian	L 53–102	5–24 (5–13)	13 – Noah	6 – Henry	3 – Wiggins	Moody Coliseum (1,111); Abilene, TX
*Non-conference game. ^{#}Rankings from AP Poll. (#) Tournament seedings in parentheses. All times are in Central.

== See also ==
- 2018–19 Incarnate Word Cardinals men's basketball team
