= Julie Goodenough =

American college basketball coach (born 1969)

Current position
- Title: Head coach
- Team: Abilene Christian
- Conference: UAC
- Record: 274–154 (.640)

Biographical details
- Born: March 25, 1969 (age 57); Dallas, Texas, U.S.

Playing career
- 1987–1989: Western Texas CC
- 1989–1991: Texas–Arlington
- Position: Forward

Coaching career (HC unless noted)
- 1991–1992: Texas–Arlington (grad. asst.)
- 1992–1993: Lubbock Christian (asst.)
- 1993–2002: Hardin–Simmons
- 2002–2005: Oklahoma State
- 2006–2012: Charleston Southern
- 2012–present: Abilene Christian

Head coaching record
- Overall: 562–373 (.601)
- Tournaments: 4–4 (WNIT); 0–2 (WBI); 0–1 (NCAA D-I); 0–1 (NCAA D-II); 9–4 (NCAA D-III); 0–2 (NAIA D-II)

Accomplishments and honors

Championships
- ASC regular season (1998); 4× ASC West Division (1999–2002); 4× ASC Tournament (1999–2002); LSC regular season (2013); Southland 2x regular season (2016, 2017)

Julie Ann Goodenough (née Roewe; born March 25, 1969) is an American college basketball coach who is currently the head women's basketball coach at Abilene Christian.

== Early life and college playing career ==
Born Julie Ann Roewe in Dallas, Goodenough graduated from Haskell High School in Haskell, Texas in 1987 and first played college basketball at the junior college level at Western Texas College before transferring to the University of Texas at Arlington in 1989. At Texas–Arlington, Goodenough played two years at forward. She averaged 8.9 points and 4.4 rebounds as a junior in 1989–90, then 14.3 points and 5.5 rebounds as a senior in 1990–91. Goodenough graduated in 1991 with a bachelor's degree in exercise and sport science.

== Coaching career ==
Goodenough began her coaching career as a graduate assistant at Texas–Arlington in 1991–92. She transferred to Texas Tech University after the season to finish her master's degree in sports administration. In the 1992–93 season, the year Texas Tech Lady Raiders basketball won the NCAA championship, Goodenough was a volunteer assistant coach at nearby Lubbock Christian University and taught physical education courses at Texas Tech.

From 1993 to 2002, Goodenough was head coach at Hardin–Simmons, which transitioned from NAIA Division II to NCAA Division III in 1996. In nine seasons, Goodenough went 82–35. Under Goodenough, Hardin–Simmons made the NCAA Division III Tournament four consecutive times from 1999 to 2002, including a trip to the Elite Eight in 2000.

From 2002 to 2005, she served as the head women's basketball coach at Oklahoma State University, going 23–61 in three seasons. Goodenough resigned on March 14, 2005.

She then coached at Charleston Southern University from 2006 to 2012 before being hired at Abilene Christian in 2012.

== Personal life ==
Julie Goodenough married school administrator Rob Goodenough in 1994. They have two children.

== Head coaching record ==
Record table
Season	Team	Overall	Conference	Standing	Postseason
Hardin–Simmons Cowgirls (Texas Intercollegiate Athletic Association) (1993–1996)
1993–94	Hardin–Simmons	24–4	9–1	T–1st	NAIA D-II First Round
1994–95	Hardin–Simmons	19–9	10–2	T–1st	NAIA D-II First Round
1995–96	Hardin–Simmons	14–9	5–5		
Hardin–Simmons Cowgirls (American Southwest Conference) (1996–2002)
1996–97	Hardin–Simmons	14–11	6–6	4th	
1997–98	Hardin–Simmons	17–7	11–3	T–1st	
1998–99	Hardin–Simmons	24–4	8–0	1st (West)	NCAA D-III Sweet 16
1999–2000	Hardin–Simmons	27–2	11–1	T–1st (West)	NCAA D-III Elite Eight
2000–01	Hardin–Simmons	22–6	15–3	1st (West)	NCAA D-III Sweet 16
2001–02	Hardin–Simmons	26–2	13–1	1st (West)	NCAA D-III Sweet 16
Hardin–Simmons:		187–54 (.776)	88–22 (.800)		
Oklahoma State Cowgirls (Big 12 Conference) (2002–2005)
2002–03	Oklahoma State	8–21	3–13	10th	
2003–04	Oklahoma State	8–20	3–13	10th	
2004–05	Oklahoma State	7–20	2–14	11th	
Oklahoma State:		23–61 (.274)	8–40 (.167)		
Charleston Southern Buccaneers (Big South Conference) (2006–2013)
2006–07	Charleston Southern	10–20	2–12	T–6th	
2007–08	Charleston Southern	8–22	3–9	T–6th	
2008–09	Charleston Southern	12–18	6–10	8th	
2009–10	Charleston Southern	17–14	9–7	T–3rd	WBI First Round
2010–11	Charleston Southern	14–16	8–8	5th	
2011–12	Charleston Southern	17–14	9–9	T–5th	WBI First Round
Charleston Southern:		78–104 (.429)	37–55 (.402)		
Abilene Christian Wildcats (Lone Star Conference) (2012–2013)
2012–13	Abilene Christian	21–7	16–4	T–1st	NCAA D-II First Round
Abilene Christian Wildcats (Southland Conference) (2013–2021)
2013–14	Abilene Christian	18–12	8–6	7th	
2014–15	Abilene Christian	17–12	9–9	8th	
2015–16	Abilene Christian	26–4	17–1	1st	WNIT First Round
2016–17	Abilene Christian	23–9	16–2	T–1st	WNIT Second Round
2017–18	Abilene Christian	16–14	9–9	7th	
2018–19	Abilene Christian	23–10	13–5	4th	NCAA D-1 First Round
2019–20	Abilene Christian	24–5	16–4	T–2nd	
2020–21	Abilene Christian	14–13	6–7	T–7th	
Abilene Christian Wildcats (Western Athletic Conference) (2021–2026)
2021–22	Abilene Christian	17–13	9–9	T–5th	
2022–23	Abilene Christian	15–15	9–9	7th	
2023–24	Abilene Christian	14–16	10–10	6th	
2024–25	Abilene Christian	22–13	9–7	6th	WNIT Super 16
2025–26	Abilene Christian	24–11	13–5	2nd	WNIT Super 16
Abilene Christian:		274–154 (.640)	160–87 (.648)		
Total:		562–373 (.601)			
National champion Postseason invitational champion Conference regular season champion Conference regular season and conference tournament champion Division regular season champion Division regular season and conference tournament champion Conference tournament champion
