= Te Kura Kaupapa Māori o Te Koutu =

Te Kura o Te Koutu

Location
- Russell Road; Koutu; Rotorua 3015; New Zealand; 38.1207°S 176.2349°E

Information
- School type: Kura Kaupapa Māori, co-educational, composite
- Motto: Mahia e tōna ringa, tino kai tino mākona
- Established: 1993
- Educational authority: Ministry of Education
- Ministry of Education Institution no.: 1153
- Chairperson: Roxanne Smith
- Principal: Koa Angus Douglas
- Years offered: 0-13
- Enrolment: 382 (July 2026)
- Language: Māori, English, Spanish
- Socio-economic decile: 3I
- Website: Koutu School Website

Te Kura Kaupapa Māori o Te Koutu is a co-educational Māori immersion school in Rotorua, New Zealand offering education within a unique Maori environment for Māori students from Year 1 to Year 13. Te Koutu students from all years learn Spanish as well as Māori and English.

== History ==
Founded in 1993 the Kura's purpose was to serve the education of Te Arawa Māori students. The school first started as a limited school with two teachers and a roll of 20–30 students. The school was first situated at Tumahourangi Marae on the shores of Lake Rotorua. When the school was moved to new facilities on Russell Rd, it gave Te Koutu an opportunity to expand and to increase the student roll.

== Roll ==
Te Kura o Te Koutu has a relatively small number of students ranging from 200 to 230. The school excels in sport, cultural activities and Spanish.

== Te Koutu houses (Rahinga) ==
- "Pareterā"
- "Kārenga"
- "Te Ririu"
- "Waoku"
- "Hinekura"

The houses are named after the five Kuia (elderly woman) of the rohe.
