= Saint Thomas Aquinas Regional Catholic High School =

Saint Thomas Aquinas High School

Location
- 14520 Voss Drive; Hammond, (Tangipahoa Parish), Louisiana 70401; United States; 30°31′45″N 90°29′17″W

Information
- Type: Private, Coeducational
- Religious affiliation: Roman Catholic
- Established: August 27, 1986
- Dean: Aaron Lips
- Principal: Will Johnson
- Teaching staff: 25.6 (on an FTE basis) (2021–22)
- Grades: 9–12
- Student to teacher ratio: 11.6 (2021–22)
- Colors: Maroon and White
- Slogan: Veritas
- Sports: Football, Cross Country, Volleyball, Boys'/Girls' Soccer, Boys'/Girls' Basketball, Baseball, Softball, Golf, Tennis, Track, Swimming, Powerlifting
- Mascot: Falcon
- Team name: Falcons/Lady Falcons
- Rival: Doyle High School
- Accreditation: Southern Association of Colleges and Schools
- Newspaper: Falcon Nest/The Flame
- Tuition: $7,800
- Website: http://www.stafalcons.org

Saint Thomas Aquinas Regional Catholic High School is a private, Roman Catholic high school in unincorporated Tangipahoa Parish, Louisiana, near Hammond. It is located in the Roman Catholic Diocese of Baton Rouge.

== History ==
The school began operations in August 1986 with 35 students.

== Students ==
The school offers grades 9, 10, 11, and 12. In the 2019–2020 school year, the student body was distributed as shown:

Grade	Students
9	95
10	72
11	89
12	58

This school has about 314 students. Of these, 271 are categorized as "white, non-Hispanic." The school is about 86% white.

== Athletics ==
Saint Thomas Aquinas Regional Catholic athletics competes in the LHSAA.

== Notable people ==
- Modestas Bukauskas, known as the "Baltic Gladiator" (born February 10, 1994), is a Lithuanian-British mixed martial artist who competes in the light heavyweight division of the Ultimate Fighting Championship (class of 2012).
- Cameron Dantzler NFL player, played cornerback for the Minnesota Vikings
