= 2015–16 Abilene Christian Wildcats men's basketball team =

American college basketball season

2015–16 Abilene Christian Wildcats men's basketball
- Conference: Southland Conference
- Record: 13–18 (8–10 Southland)
- Head coach: Joe Golding (5th season)
- Assistant coaches: Brette Tanner; Patrice Days; Cooper Schmidt
- Home arena: Moody Coliseum (Capacity: 4,600)

2015–16 Southland Conference men's basketball standings
	Conf.				Overall
Team	W		L	PCT	W		L	PCT
Stephen F. Austin †	18	–	0	1.000	28	–	6	.824
Texas A&M–CC	15	–	3	.833	25	–	8	.758
Sam Houston State	12	–	6	.667	18	–	16	.529
Incarnate Word*	12	–	6	.667	17	–	12	.586
Houston Baptist	10	–	8	.556	17	–	17	.500
Southeastern Louisiana	9	–	9	.500	12	–	21	.364
Abilene Christian*	8	–	10	.444	13	–	18	.419
McNeese State	7	–	11	.389	9	–	20	.310
Central Arkansas**	6	–	12	.333	7	–	21	.250
New Orleans	6	–	12	.333	10	–	20	.333
Nicholls State	6	–	12	.333	11	–	23	.324
Northwestern State	5	–	13	.278	8	–	20	.286
Lamar	3	–	15	.167	11	–	19	.367
† 2016 Southland tournament winner * Ineligible for postseason during transition to Division I ** Ineligible for postseason due to APR violations

The 2015–16 Abilene Christian Wildcats men's basketball team represented Abilene Christian University during the 2015–16 NCAA Division I men's basketball season. The Wildcats were led by fifth year head coach Joe Golding and played their home games at the Moody Coliseum. They were members of the Southland Conference. The Wildcats finished the season with a record of 13–18, 8–10 in Southland play to finish in seventh place.

Abilene Christian, in their third year of Division II to Division I transition, were not eligible for the Southland tournament, but were considered a Division I team for scheduling purposes and a Division I RPI member.

== Preseason ==
The Wildcats were picked to finish thirteenth (13th) in both the Southland Conference Coaches' Poll and the conference Sports Information Director's Poll.

== Roster ==
2015–16 Abilene Christian Wildcats men's basketball team
Players
Coaches

Pos.	#	Name	Height	Weight	Year	Previous school	Hometown
G	0	Javlen Franklin	6 ft 2 in (1.88 m)	195 lb (88 kg)	Fr	Parkview HS (Little Rock)	Jacksonville, AR
F	1	Jaren Lewis	6 ft 6 in (1.98 m)	210 lb (95 kg)	Fr	Lake Highland Prep	Orlando, FL
G	3	Parker Wentz	5 ft 9 in (1.75 m)	170 lb (77 kg)	Sr	Trinity Christian HS	Lubbock, TX
G	4	Jovan Crnic	6 ft 5 in (1.96 m)	220 lb (100 kg)	Jr	Northern Oklahoma College	Nis, Serbia
G	5	Jalen Little	5 ft 11 in (1.8 m)	170 lb (77 kg)	Sr	Otero Junior College	Colorado Springs, CO
G	10	Isaiah Tripp	6 ft 1 in (1.85 m)	190 lb (86 kg)	So	Future College Prep	Baltimore, MD
F	12	Austin Cooke	6 ft 7 in (2.01 m)	235 lb (107 kg)	Sr	Central Arizona College	Scottsdale, AZ
F	15	Hayden Farquhar	6 ft 7 in (2.01 m)	230 lb (104 kg)	Fr	Throckmorton HS	Throckmorton, TX
G	22	Drake Green	6 ft 3 in (1.91 m)	170 lb (77 kg)	So	Clear Lake HS	Houston, TX
F	23	Hayden Howell	6 ft 7 in (2.01 m)	225 lb (102 kg)	So	Carl Albert HS	Midwest City, OK
F	33	Duran Porter	6 ft 8 in (2.03 m)	240 lb (109 kg)	Sr	Tallahassee CC	Macon, GA
C		Jalone Friday	6 ft 9 in (2.06 m)	250 lb (113 kg)	Fr	Oklahoma City, OK
G		Jerod Martin	6 ft 1 in (1.85 m)	185 lb (84 kg)	Fr	Home school	Wichita, KS
G		B. J. Maxwell	6 ft 4 in (1.93 m)	175 lb (79 kg)	Fr	Home school	Austin, TX
G		Jadon Reynolds	6 ft 1 in (1.85 m)	170 lb (77 kg)	Fr	Fort Worth, TX

Head coach

- Joe Golding

Assistant coach(es)

- Brette Tanner
- Solomon Bozeman
- Ron Holmes

Legend

- (C) Team captain
- (S) Suspended
- (I) Ineligible
- (W) Walk-on
- Injured
- Current redshirt

Roster
Last update: 2015-11-20

== Schedule and results ==
Date time, TV	Opponent	Result	Record	Site (attendance) city, state
Non-Conference regular season
11/13/2015*; 6:00 pm	University of the Southwest	W 94–63	1–0	Moody Coliseum (1,150); Abilene, TX
11/17/2015*; 7:00 pm	Howard Payne	W 70–56	2–0	Moody Coliseum (1,075); Abilene, TX
11/22/2015*; 9:00 pm	at Portland	L 57–87	2–1	Chiles Center (1,541); Portland, OR
11/24/2015*; 6:00 pm	at Colorado State	L 100–108 ^{2OT}	2–2	Moby Arena (2,801); Fort Collins, CO
11/27/2015*; 5:00 pm	vs. Florida A&M; Corpus Christi Coastal Classic	W 72–62	3–2	American Bank Center (176); Corpus Christi, TX
11/28/2015*; 2:30 pm	vs. Oakland; Corpus Christi Coastal Classic	L 57–85	3–3	American Bank Center (168); Corpus Christi, TX
12/03/2015*; 7:00 pm	New Hampshire	L 75–86	3–4	Moody Coliseum (1,450); Abilene, TX
12/05/2015*; 1:00 pm	at Nebraska	L 63–73	3–5	Pinnacle Bank Arena (15,491); Lincoln, NE
12/12/2015*; 1:00 pm	Schreiner	W 69–46	4–5	Moody Coliseum (512); Abilene, TX
12/18/2015*; 7:00 pm	UC Riverside	L 56–60	4–6	Moody Coliseum (1,002); Abilene, TX
12/20/2015*; 1:00 pm	at TCU	L 69–80	4–7	Ed and Rae Schollmaier Arena (5,791); Fort Worth, TX
12/22/2015*; 6:00 pm	at Drake	L 70–87	4–8	Knapp Center (2,701); Des Moines, IA
12/30/2015*; 7:00 pm	Hillsdale Baptist	W 90–48	5–8	Moody Coliseum; Abilene, TX
Southland regular season
01/02/2016; 4:00 pm	at Central Arkansas	W 62–61	6–8 (1–0)	Farris Center (512); Conway, AR
01/09/2016; 3:30 pm	at Nicholls State	L 62–63	6–9 (1–1)	Stopher Gym (1,297); Thibodaux, LA
01/12/2016; 7:00 pm	Northwestern State	W 87–72	7–9 (2–1)	Moody Coliseum (1,512); Abilene, TX
01/16/2016; 6:00 pm, ESPN3	at Stephen F. Austin	L 62–97	7–10 (2–2)	William R. Johnson Coliseum (3,873); Nacogdoches, TX
01/19/2016; 7:00 pm	McNeese State	W 75–67	8–10 (3–2)	Moody Coliseum (1,619); Abilene, TX
01/23/2016; 4:30 pm	at Incarnate Word	L 60–74	8–11 (3–3)	McDermott Center (1,722); San Antonio, TX
01/25/2016; 6:00 pm	at Sam Houston State	L 51–72	8–12 (3–4)	Bernard Johnson Coliseum (1,051); Huntsville, TX
01/30/2015; 4:00 pm	Lamar	W 80–71	9–12 (4–4)	Moody Coliseum (2,103); Abilene, TX
02/02/2016; 7:00 pm	Houston Baptist	W 79–72	10–12 (5–4)	Moody Coliseum (1,226); Abilene, TX
02/06/2016; 4:00 pm	at Southeastern Louisiana	L 61–80	10–13 (5–5)	University Center (763); Hammond, LA
02/08/2016; 7:00 pm, ESPN3	at Lamar	W 71–67	11–13 (6–5)	Montagne Center (1,743); Beaumont, TX
02/15/2016; 7:30 pm	vs. Sam Houston State	L 71–84	11–14 (6–6)	Mabee Complex (Hardin Simmons University) (1,075); Abilene, TX
02/18/2016; 7:00 pm	at Houston Baptist	L 71–73	11–15 (6–7)	Sharp Gymnasium (827); Houston, TX
02/21/2016; 1:00 pm	Southeastern Louisiana	W 91–80	12–15 (7–7)	Moody Coliseum (1,065); Abilene, TX
02/23/2016; 7:00 pm	at Texas A&M–Corpus Christi	L 59–65	12–16 (7–8)	American Bank Center (1,428); Corpus Christi, TX
02/27/2016; 4:00 pm	New Orleans	W 87–84	13–16 (8–8)	Moody Coliseum (1,987); Abilene, TX
03/03/2016; 7:00 pm	Incarnate Word	L 70–74	13–17 (8–9)	Moody Coliseum (1,633); Abilene, TX
03/05/2015; 4:00 pm	Texas A&M–Corpus Christi	L 69–74	13–18 (8–10)	Moody Coliseum (1,363); Abilene, TX
*Non-conference game. ^{#}Rankings from AP Poll. (#) Tournament seedings in parentheses. All times are in Central Time.

== See also ==
- 2015–16 Abilene Christian Wildcats women's basketball team
