= 2015–16 Central Arkansas Bears basketball team =

American college basketball season

2015–16 Central Arkansas Bears basketball
- Conference: Southland Conference
- Record: 7–21 (6–12 Southland)
- Head coach: Russ Pennell (2nd season)
- Assistant coaches: Anthony Boone (2nd season); Matt Scherbenske; Josh Lowery
- Home arena: Farris Center (Capacity: 6,000)

2015–16 Southland Conference men's basketball standings
| | Conf. | | | | Overall |
| Team | W | | L | PCT | W | | L | PCT |
|---|---|---|---|---|---|---|---|---|
| Stephen F. Austin † | 18 | – | 0 | 1.000 | 28 | – | 6 | .824 |
| Texas A&M–CC | 15 | – | 3 | .833 | 25 | – | 8 | .758 |
| Sam Houston State | 12 | – | 6 | .667 | 18 | – | 16 | .529 |
| Incarnate Word* | 12 | – | 6 | .667 | 17 | – | 12 | .586 |
| Houston Baptist | 10 | – | 8 | .556 | 17 | – | 17 | .500 |
| Southeastern Louisiana | 9 | – | 9 | .500 | 12 | – | 21 | .364 |
| Abilene Christian* | 8 | – | 10 | .444 | 13 | – | 18 | .419 |
| McNeese State | 7 | – | 11 | .389 | 9 | – | 20 | .310 |
| Central Arkansas** | 6 | – | 12 | .333 | 7 | – | 21 | .250 |
| New Orleans | 6 | – | 12 | .333 | 10 | – | 20 | .333 |
| Nicholls State | 6 | – | 12 | .333 | 11 | – | 23 | .324 |
| Northwestern State | 5 | – | 13 | .278 | 8 | – | 20 | .286 |
| Lamar | 3 | – | 15 | .167 | 11 | – | 19 | .367 |
† 2016 Southland tournament winner * Ineligible for postseason during transition to Division I ** Ineligible for postseason due to APR violations

The 2015–16 Central Arkansas Bears basketball team represented the University of Central Arkansas during the 2015–16 NCAA Division I men's basketball season. The Bears were led by head coach Russ Pennell and played their home games at the Farris Center. They were members of the Southland Conference. They finished the season 7–21, 6–12 in Southland play to finish in a three-way tie for ninth place. Due to APR penalties, they were not eligible for postseason play, including the Southland tournament.

== Preseason ==
The Bears were picked to finish 12th in both the Southland Conference Coaches' Poll and the Sports Information Director's Poll.

== Roster ==
2015–16 Central Arkansas Bears men's basketball team
Players
Coaches

| Pos. | # | Name | Height | Weight | Year | Previous school | Hometown |
|---|---|---|---|---|---|---|---|
| F | 00 | Boo Milligan | 6 ft 6 in (1.98 m) | 200 lb (91 kg) | So | Future College Prep | Los Angeles, CA |
| G | 1 | Jordan Howard | 5 ft 11 in (1.8 m) | 180 lb (82 kg) | So | Perry HS | Chandler, AZ |
| F | 2 | Ethan Lee | 6 ft 7 in (2.01 m) | 200 lb (91 kg) | Jr | Camden Fairview | Camden, AR |
| G | 3 | Tyler Simmons | 6 ft 1 in (1.85 m) | 175 lb (79 kg) | So | Greenbrier | Greenbrier, AR |
| F/C | 4 | Albert Christensson | 6 ft 9 in (2.06 m) | 215 lb (98 kg) | So | South Kent Prep (Conn.) | Lund Sweden |
| F | 5 | Justin Foreman | 6 ft 5 in (1.96 m) | 225 lb (102 kg) | Sr | Grand Canyon University | Bellaire, TX |
| G | 10 | Mathieu Kamba | 6 ft 5 in (1.96 m) | 210 lb (95 kg) | So | Bishop McNally | Calgary Alberta Canada |
| G | 11 | Jeff Lowery | 6 ft 2 in (1.88 m) | 195 lb (88 kg) | Jr | Grand Canyon University | Phoenix, AZ |
| F | 13 | Otas Iyekekpolor | 6 ft 8 in (2.03 m) | 220 lb (100 kg) | So | Lillian Osborne HS | Edmonton, AB, Canada |
| F/C | 22 | Tanner Schmit | 6 ft 8 in (2.03 m) | 222 lb (101 kg) | Fr | Nicholls School | Buffalo, NY |
| G | 25 | Thatch Unruh | 6 ft 5 in (1.96 m) | 190 lb (86 kg) | So | Quakerdale Prep | Branson, MO |
| G | 30 | Mike Martin | 6 ft 0 in (1.83 m) | 190 lb (86 kg) | Sr | Coffeyville CC | Wichita, KS |
| G | 32 | Derreck Brooks | 6 ft 6 in (1.98 m) | 185 lb (84 kg) | Jr | Phoenix College | Portland, OR |
| C | 52 | Jake Zuilhof | 6 ft 9 in (2.06 m) | 240 lb (109 kg) | GS | Grand Canyon University | Azle, TX |

Head coach

- Russ Pennell

Assistant coach(es)

- Anthony Boone (Mississippi)
- Matt Scherbenske
- Josh Lowery

Legend

- (C) Team captain
- (S) Suspended
- (I) Ineligible
- (W) Walk-on
- Injured
- Current redshirt

Roster
Last update: 2015-12-05

== Schedule and results ==
| Date time, TV | Opponent | Result | Record | Site (attendance) city, state |
Exhibition
| 10/31/2015*; 3:00 pm | Lyon College | W 77–69 | | Farris Center (N/A); Conway, AR |
| 11/07/2015*; 7:00 pm | Central Baptist College | W 83–80 | | Farris Center (N/A); Conway, AR |
Non-conference regular season
| 11/14/2015*; 4:00 pm | at Tulsa | L 81–98 | 0–1 | Reynolds Center (3,839); Tulsa, OK |
| 11/19/2015*; 6:00 pm | at UMass; Men Who Speak Up Main Event | L 62–89 | 0–2 | William D. Mullins Memorial Center (3,158); Amherst, MA |
| 11/21/2015*; 4:00 pm | at Rutgers; Men Who Speak Up Main Event | L 84–87 | 0–3 | Louis Brown Athletic Center (4,113); Piscataway, NJ |
| 11/23/2016*; 12:30 pm | vs. UTSA; Men Who Speak Up Main Event; Middleweight semifinals | W 94–84 | 1–3 | MGM Grand Garden Arena (323); Paradise, NV |
| 11/25/2015*; 3:30 pm | vs. Howard; Men Who Speak Up Main Event; Middleweight championship | L 54–73 | 1–4 | MGM Grand Garden Arena (217); Paradise, NV |
| 12/01/2015*; 7:00 pm | at Arkansas–Little Rock | L 73–79 | 1–5 | Jack Stephens Center (3,638); Little Rock, AR |
| 12/03/2015*; 8:00 pm | at Oklahoma | L 68–111 | 1–6 | Lloyd Noble Center (7,109); Norman, OK |
| 12/06/2015*; 11:00 am, ESPN3 | at Pittsburgh | L 47–100 | 1–7 | Petersen Events Center (7,049); Pittsburgh, PA |
| 12/16/2015*; 7:00 pm | at Arkansas–Little Rock | L 54–77 | 1–8 | Farris Center (3,055); Conway, AR |
| 12/22/2015*; 7:05 pm | at Arkansas State | L 67–77 | 1–9 | Convocation Center (1,040); Jonesboro, AR |
Conference Games
| 01/02/2016> 4:00 pm | Abilene Christian | L 61–62 | 1–10 (0–1) | Farris Center (512); Conway, AR |
| 01/05/2016; 7:30 pm | at Texas A&M-Corpus Christi | L 82–94 | 1–11 (0–2) | American Bank Center (837); Corpus Christi, TX |
| 01/09/2016; 4:00 pm | Lamar | W 93–76 | 2–11 (1–2) | Farris Center (1,225); Conway, AR |
| 01/12/2016; 7:00 pm | at Stephen F. Austin | L 64–85 | 2–12 (1–3) | William R. Johnson Coliseum (2,142); Nacogdoches, TX |
| 01/19/2016; 7:00 pm | Houston Baptist | L 61–72 | 2–13 (1–4) | Farris Center; Conway, AR |
| 01/23/2016; 3:00 pm | at Nicholls State | W 94–83 | 3–13 (2–4) | Stopher Gym (1,567); Thibodaux, LA |
| 01/25/2016; 7:00 pm | at New Orleans | L 83–94 | 3–14 (2–5) | Lakefront Arena (414); New Orleans, LA |
| 02/02/2016; 6:30 pm | at Northwestern State | L 75–91 | 3–15 (2–6) | Prather Coliseum (1,423); Natchitoches, LA |
| 02/06/2016; 4:00 pm | New Orleans | W 112–77 | 4–15 (3–6) | Farris Center (2,192); Conway, AR |
| 02/09/2016; 7:00 pm | Southeastern Louisiana | W 88–72 | 5–15 (4–6) | Farris Center (513); Conway, AR |
| 02/12/2016; 7:00 pm | at Incarnate Word | L 69–71 | 5–16 (4–7) | McDermott Center (827); San Antonio, TX |
| 02/15/2016; 7:00 pm | Northwestern State | W 107–94 | 6–16 (5–7) | Farris Center (715); Conway, AR |
| 02/20/2016; 4:30 pm | at Sam Houston State | L 75–105 | 6–17 (5–8) | Bernard Johnson Coliseum (2,139); Huntsville, TX |
| 02/22/2016; 7:00 pm | at McNeese State | W 88–82 | 7–17 (6–8) | Burton Coliseum (331); Lake Charles, LA |
| 02/27/2016; 4:00 pm | at Southeastern Louisiana | L 56–75 | 7–18 (6–9) | University Center (831); Hammond, LA |
| 02/29/2016; 7:00 pm | Sam Houston State | L 73–83 | 7–19 (6–10) | Farris Center (748); Conway, AR |
| 03/03/2016; 7:00 pm | Nicholls State | L 64–68 | 7–20 (6–11) | Farris Center (948); Conway, AR |
| 03/05/2016; 4:00 pm | McNeese State | L 77–85 | 7–21 (6–12) | Farris Center (823); Conway, AR |
*Non-conference game. ^{#}Rankings from AP Poll. (#) Tournament seedings in parentheses. All times are in Central Time.

== See also ==
- 2015–16 Central Arkansas Sugar Bears basketball team
