= 2016 Southland Conference men's basketball tournament =

- Classification: Division I
- Season: 2015–16
- Teams: 8
- Site: Merrell Center; Katy, Texas
- Champions: Stephen F. Austin (4th title)
- Winning coach: Brad Underwood (3rd title)
- MVP: Thomas Walkup (Stephen F. Austin)
- Attendance: 9,793
- Television: ESPN3, ESPN2

2015–16 Southland Conference men's basketball standings
	Conf.				Overall
Team	W		L	PCT	W		L	PCT
Stephen F. Austin †	18	–	0	1.000	28	–	6	.824
Texas A&M–CC	15	–	3	.833	25	–	8	.758
Sam Houston State	12	–	6	.667	18	–	16	.529
Incarnate Word*	12	–	6	.667	17	–	12	.586
Houston Baptist	10	–	8	.556	17	–	17	.500
Southeastern Louisiana	9	–	9	.500	12	–	21	.364
Abilene Christian*	8	–	10	.444	13	–	18	.419
McNeese State	7	–	11	.389	9	–	20	.310
Central Arkansas**	6	–	12	.333	7	–	21	.250
New Orleans	6	–	12	.333	10	–	20	.333
Nicholls State	6	–	12	.333	11	–	23	.324
Northwestern State	5	–	13	.278	8	–	20	.286
Lamar	3	–	15	.167	11	–	19	.367
† 2016 Southland tournament winner * Ineligible for postseason during transition to Division I ** Ineligible for postseason due to APR violations

The 2016 Southland Conference men's basketball tournament, a part of the 2015–16 NCAA Division I men's basketball season, took place March 9–12 at the Merrell Center in Katy, Texas. The winner of the tournament will receive the Southland Conference's automatic bid to the 2016 NCAA tournament.

Two programs in their third year of the transition from NCAA Division II to Division I, Abilene Christian and Incarnate Word, were ineligible for the tournament. In addition, Central Arkansas was ineligible for the tournament for failure to meet enhanced NCAA Academic Performance Rating (APR) requirements.

== Seeds ==
The top 8 teams in the conference qualified for the tournament. The top 2 seeds earned double byes into the Semifinals. The #3 and #4 seeds received a single buy to the Quarterfinals.

Teams were seeded by record within the division and conference, with a tiebreaker system to seed teams with identical conference records.

Seed	School	Conference	Tiebreaker
1	Stephen F. Austin	18–0	
2	Texas A&M–CC	15–3	
3	Sam Houston State	12–6	
4	Houston Baptist	10–8	
5	Southeastern Louisiana	9–9	
6	McNeese State	7–11	
7	Nicholls State	6–12	1–1 vs. Southeastern Louisiana
8	New Orleans	6–12	0–2 vs. Southeastern Louisiana

== Schedule ==
Session	Game	Time*	Matchup^{#}	Score	Television
First round – Wednesday, March 9
1	1	5:00 pm	#5 Southeastern Louisiana vs. #8 New Orleans	84–74	ESPN3
1	2	7:30 pm	#6 McNeese State vs. #7 Nicholls State	90–94^{2OT}	ESPN3
Quarterfinals – Thursday, March 10
2	3	5:00pm	#4 Houston Baptist vs. #5 Southeastern Louisiana	73–68	ESPN3
2	4	7:30pm	#3 Sam Houston State vs. #7 Nicholls State	60–59	ESPN3
Semifinals – Friday, March 11
3	5	5:00 pm	#1 Stephen F. Austin vs. #4 Houston Baptist	104–68	ESPN3
3	6	7:30pm	#2 Texas A&M–CC vs. #3 Sam Houston State	79–76	ESPN3
Championship – Saturday, March 12
4	7	8:30pm	#1 Stephen F. Austin vs. #2 Texas A&M–CC	82–60	ESPN2
*Game times in CST. #-Rankings denote tournament seeding.

== Bracket ==
First round Wednesday, March 9 ESPN3
5	SE Louisiana	84
8	New Orleans	74
6	McNeese State	90
7	Nicholls State	94**

Quarterfinals; Thursday, March 10; ESPN3
4	Houston Baptist	73
5	SE Louisiana	68
3	Sam Houston State	60
7	Nicholls State	59

Semifinals; Friday, March 11; ESPN3
1	Stephen F. Austin	104
4	Houston Baptist	68
2	Texas A&M–CC	79
3	Sam Houston State	76

Championship; Saturday, March 12; ESPN2
1	Stephen F. Austin	82
2	Texas A&M–CC	60

* – denotes overtime period

== Game summaries ==
=== First round ===
ESPN3

03/09/2016
5:00 pm

Recap

#8 New Orleans 74, #5 Southeastern Louisiana 84
Scoring by half: 42–49, 32–35
Pts: Nate Frye 21; Rebs: Kevin Hill 8 Asts: Frye, Gill 5	Pts: Zay Jackson 17; Rebs: Jordan Capps 10; Asts: Joshua Filmore 7

Merrell Center
Katy, TX
Attendance: 1,077
Referees: Rob Wolff, Jon Stigliano, Kerby Sitton

ESPN3

03/09/2016
7:30 pm

Recap

#7 Nicholls State 94, #6 McNeese State 90 (2OT)
Scoring by half: 48–37, 25–36 Overtime: 21–17
Pts: T.J. Carpenter 22; Rebs: Liam Thomas 8 Asts: Liam Thomas 3	Pts: Jarren Greenwood 23; Rebs: Austin Lewis 11; Asts: Jamaya Burr 4

Merrell Center
Katy, TX
Attendance: 1,077
Referees: Brent Dugas, Dave Cusick, Ross Cullins

=== Quarterfinals ===
ESPN3

03/10/2016
5:00 pm

Recap

#5 Southeastern Louisiana 68, #4 Houston Baptist 73
Scoring by half: 20–33, 48–40
Pts: Jordan Capps 23; Rebs: Jordan Capps 10; Asts: Jackson, Veal 4	Pts: Anthony Odunsi 20; Rebs: Isaiah Robinson 12; Asts: Lasher, Odunsi 3

Merrell Center
Katy, TX
Attendance: 1,298
Referees: Joe Wilbert III, Jeff Malham, Patrick Boeh

ESPN3

03/10/2016
7:30 pn

Recap

#7 Nicholls State 59, #3 Sam Houston State 60
Scoring by half: 34–38, 25–22
Pts: Quinton Thomas 12; Rebs: Carpenter, Thomas 5 Asts: Schane Rillieux 4	Pts: Aurimas Majauskas 16; Rebs: Torry Butler 10; Asts: Almanza, Delaney 3

Merrell Center
Katy, TX
Attendance: 1,298
Referees: Gerald Williams, Danny Chance, Sean Casey

=== Semifinals ===
ESPN3

03/11/2016
5:00 pm

Recap

#4 Houston Baptist 68, #1 Stephen F. Austin 104
Scoring by half: 32–54, 36–50
Pts: Caleb Crayton 20; Rebs: Lasher, Robinson 5 Asts: Anthony Odunsi 3	Pts: Demetrious Floyd 30; Rebs: Charles, Geffrard Jr. 9 Asts: Pinkney, Walkup 6

Merrell Center
Katy, TX
Attendance: 3,019
Referees: Kerry Sitton, James Durham, Toby Martinez

ESPN3

03/11/2016
7:30 pm

Recap

#3 Sam Houston State 76, #2 Texas A&M–CC 79
Scoring by half: 40–28, 36–51
Pts: Albert Almanza 17; Rebs: Torry Butler 6 Asts: Jovante' Spivey 5	Pts: Hameed Ali 18; Rebs: Bryce Douvier 8 Asts: Hameed Ali 4

Merrell Center
Katy, TX
Attendance: 3,019
Referees: Marques Pettigrew, Brooks Wells, Roger Schmitz

=== Championship ===
ESPN2

03/12/2016
8:30 pm

Recap

#2 Texas A&M–CC 60, #1 Stephen F. Austin 82
Scoring by half: 29–48, 31–34
Pts: Joe Kilgore 14; Rebs: Rashawn Thomas 9 Asts: Four Tied 2	Pts: Thomas Walkup 19; Rebs: Clide Geffrard Jr. 8 Asts: Ty Charles 4

Merrell Center
Katy, TX
Attendance: 4,399
Referees: Brent Meaux, Keith Kimble, Kelly Hunt

== Awards and honors ==
Tournament MVP: Thomas Walkup

All-Tournament Team:

- Hameed Ali (Texas A&M–CC)
- Demetrious Floyd (Stephen F. Austin)
- Thomas Walkup (Stephen F. Austin) (MVP)
- Clide Geffrard (Stephen F. Austin)
- Jordan Capps (Southeastern Louisiana)

== See also ==
2016 Southland Conference women's basketball tournament
