= 2015–16 Stephen F. Austin Lumberjacks basketball team =

American college basketball season

2015–16 Stephen F. Austin Lumberjacks basketball

Southland regular season & tournament champions

NCAA tournament, Second Round
- Conference: Southland Conference
- Record: 0–6, 28 wins vacated (0–0 Southland, 18 wins vacated)
- Head coach: Brad Underwood (3rd season)
- Assistant coaches: Mike Boynton.; Stephen Gentry; Erik Pastrana
- Home arena: William R. Johnson Coliseum (Capacity: 7,203)

2015–16 Southland Conference men's basketball standings
	Conf.				Overall
Team	W		L	PCT	W		L	PCT
Stephen F. Austin †	18	–	0	1.000	28	–	6	.824
Texas A&M–CC	15	–	3	.833	25	–	8	.758
Sam Houston State	12	–	6	.667	18	–	16	.529
Incarnate Word*	12	–	6	.667	17	–	12	.586
Houston Baptist	10	–	8	.556	17	–	17	.500
Southeastern Louisiana	9	–	9	.500	12	–	21	.364
Abilene Christian*	8	–	10	.444	13	–	18	.419
McNeese State	7	–	11	.389	9	–	20	.310
Central Arkansas**	6	–	12	.333	7	–	21	.250
New Orleans	6	–	12	.333	10	–	20	.333
Nicholls State	6	–	12	.333	11	–	23	.324
Northwestern State	5	–	13	.278	8	–	20	.286
Lamar	3	–	15	.167	11	–	19	.367
† 2016 Southland tournament winner * Ineligible for postseason during transition to Division I ** Ineligible for postseason due to APR violations

The 2015–16 Stephen F. Austin Lumberjacks basketball team represented Stephen F. Austin State University during the 2015–16 NCAA Division I men's basketball season. The Lumberjacks were led by head coach Brad Underwood and played their home games at the William R. Johnson Coliseum. They were members of the Southland Conference. The Lumberjacks finished the season with a record of 28–6, 18–0 in Southland play to win the regular season championship. They won the Southland tournament championship to earn the conference's automatic bid to the NCAA tournament. As a #14 seed, they upset #3 ranked West Virginia in the first round before losing in the final seconds to Notre Dame in the second round.

On March 21, 2016, head coach Brad Underwood left the school and was named the head coach at Oklahoma State.

On May 20, 2020, following the discovery of an administrative error in certifying eligibility for student-athletes, Stephen F. Austin reached an agreement with the NCAA to vacate hundreds of wins across multiple sports from 2013 to 2019, including all 117 men's basketball wins from the 2014–15 to 2018–19 seasons.

== Preseason ==
The Lumberjacks were picked to finish first (1st) in both the Southland Conference Coaches' Poll and in the Sports Information Directors Poll receiving eleven (12) first place votes in the Coaches' poll and ten (9) first place votes in the SID poll.

== Roster ==
2015–16 Stephen F. Austin Lumberjacks men's basketball team
Players
Coaches

Pos.	#	Name	Height	Weight	Year	Previous school	Hometown
G/F	0	Thomas Walkup	6 ft 4 in (1.93 m)	195 lb (88 kg)	RS Sr	Deer Park HS	Pasadena, TX
G	1	Demetrious Floyd	5 ft 11 in (1.8 m)	170 lb (77 kg)	Sr	McCluer HS; Chipola College	St. Louis, MO
F	2	CJ Williams	6 ft 7 in (2.01 m)	240 lb (109 kg)	Jr	Pebblebrook	Powder Springs, GA
G	3	Jared Johnson	6 ft 0 in (1.83 m)	170 lb (77 kg)	Sr	Ridge View HS; Hill College	Columbia, SC
G	4	Ty Charles	6 ft 5 in (1.96 m)	190 lb (86 kg)	So	Kennedale HS	Kennedale, TX
G	5	Lasani Johnson	6 ft 1 in (1.85 m)	178 lb (81 kg)	Fr	Bishop Dunne	Dallas, TX
G	10	Trey Pinkney	5 ft 9 in (1.75 m)	160 lb (73 kg)	Sr	Seven Lakes HS	Katy, TX
F	11	Clide Geffrard	6 ft 5 in (1.96 m)	220 lb (100 kg)	Sr	Ely HS; Northwest Florida State College	Pompano Beach, FL
G	12	Dallas Cameron	6 ft 3 in (1.91 m)	180 lb (82 kg)	Jr	Ely HS	Pompano Beach, FL
G	15	Payton Stephens	6 ft 4 in (1.93 m)	215 lb (98 kg)	Fr	McPherson	McPherson, KS
F	22	T. J. Holyfield	6 ft 8 in (2.03 m)	210 lb (95 kg)	Fr	Elev8 Sports Institute (Fla.)	Albuquerque, NM
F	23	Nathan Bain	6 ft 6 in (1.98 m)	200 lb (91 kg)	Fr	Sunrise Christian Academy (Kan.)	Freeport, Bahamas
G	24	Jonny Dahl	6 ft 4 in (1.93 m)	195 lb (88 kg)	Fr	Keokuk	Keokuk, IA
G	30	Tyler Underwood	6 ft 1 in (1.85 m)	160 lb (73 kg)	Fr	Nacogdoches	Nacogdoches, TX
C	32	Jovan Grujić	7 ft 0 in (2.13 m)	225 lb (102 kg)	Fr	South Kent School (Conn.)	Pančevo, Serbia
F	35	JaQuan Smith	6 ft 9 in (2.06 m)	250 lb (113 kg)	Jr	Edmondson	Baltimore, MD

Head coach

- Brad Underwood (Kansas State)

Assistant coach(es)

- Mike Boynton, Jr. (South Carolina)
- Stephen Gentry (Gonzaga)
- Erik Pastrana (Florida State)

Legend

- (C) Team captain
- (S) Suspended
- (I) Ineligible
- (W) Walk-on
- Injured
- Current redshirt

Roster
Last update: 12/05/2015

== Schedule ==
Source: Access date: 11/15/2015

Date time, TV	Rank^{#}	Opponent^{#}	Result	Record	Site (attendance) city, state
Out of Conference
11/13/2015*; 8:30 pm, Fox Sports SW		at No. 22 Baylor	L 55–97	0–1	Ferrell Center (7,041); Waco, TX
11/17/2015*; 7:00 am, ESPN2		at Northern Iowa; ESPN Tip-Off Marathon	L 60–70	0–2	McLeod Center (4,720); Cedar Rapids, IA
11/22/2015*; 2:00 pm		LSU–Alexandria	W 88–64	1–2	William R. Johnson Coliseum (2,119); Nacogdoches, TX
11/26/2015*; 4:30 pm, ASN		vs. Western Michigan; Music City Challenge	W 79–71	2–2	Nashville Municipal Auditorium (N/A); Nashville, TN
11/27/2015*; 7:30 pm		vs. Tulane; Music City Challenge	L 59–60	2–3	Nashville Municipal Auditorium (N/A); Nashville, TN
11/29/2015*; 3:30 pm, ASN		vs. Appalachian State; Music City Challenge	W 94–84	3–3	Nashville Municipal Auditorium (N/A); Nashville, TN
12/05/2015*; 4:00 pm, ESPN3		Texas Southern	W 66–62	4–3	William R. Johnson Coliseum (2,392); Nacogdoches, TX
12/08/2015*; 7:00 pm, ESPN3		Henderson State	W 87–54	5–3	William R. Johnson Coliseum (1,832); Nacogdoches, TX
12/12/2015*; 6:00 pm, ESPN3		Arkansas Tech	W 86–48	6–3	William R. Johnson Coliseum (2,063); Nacogdoches, TX
12/19/2015*; 5:00 pm, ESPN3		Our Lady of the Lake	W 95–56	7–3	Shelton Gym (635); Nacogdoches, TX
12/22/2015*; 2:00 pm, Pac12		at Arizona State	L 73–80	7–4	Wells Fargo Arena (4,373); Tempe, AZ
12/29/2015*; 2:30 pm, ASN		at UAB	L 66–76	7–5	Bartow Arena (3,956); Birmingham, AL
Conference Games
01/02/2016; 6:00 pm, ESPN3		McNeese State	W 86–57	8–5 (1–0)	William R. Johnson Coliseum (2,284); Nacogdoches, TX
01/04/2016; 7:00 pm		at Southeastern Louisiana	W 89–69	9–5 (2–0)	University Center (540); Hammond, LA
01/12/2016; 7:00 pm, ESPN3		Central Arkansas	W 85–64	10–5 (3–0)	William R. Johnson Coliseum (2,142); Nacogdoches, TX
01/16/2016; 6:00 pm, ESPN3		Abilene Christian	W 97–62	11–5 (4–0)	William R. Johnson Coliseum (3,873); Nacogdoches, TX
01/18/2016; 7:00 pm, ASN		at New Orleans	W 82–58	12–5 (5–0)	Lakefront Arena; New Orleans, LA
01/23/2016; 6:00 pm, ESPN3		Sam Houston State	W 76–64	13–5 (6–0)	William R. Johnson Coliseum (7,123); Nacogdoches, TX
01/25/2016; 7:00 pm, ESPN3		Lamar	W 86–52	14–5 (7–0)	William R. Johnson Coliseum (2,485); Nacogdoches, TX
01/30/2016; 2:00 pm		at Texas A&M–Corpus Christi	W 66–61	15–5 (8–0)	American Bank Center (2,348); Corpus Christi, TX
02/06/2016; 7:00 pm		at Houston Baptist	W 72–66	16–5 (9–0)	Sharp Gymnasium (1,082); Houston, TX
02/08/2016; 7:00 pm, ESPN3		Northwestern State	W 83–72	17–5 (10–0)	William R. Johnson Coliseum (3,723); Nacogdoches, LA
02/13/2016; 6:00 pm, ESPN3		Texas A&M–Corpus Christi	W 70–58	18–5 (11–0)	William R. Johnson Coliseum (6,264); Nacogdoches, TX
02/15/2016; 7:00 pm, ESPN3		Incarnate Word	W 84–46	19–5 (12–0)	William R. Johnson Coliseum (2,892); Nacogdoches, TX
02/20/2016; 6:00 pm		at Nicholls	W 88–53	20–5 (13–0)	Stopher Gym (522); Thibodaux, LA
02/22/2016; 7:00 pm, ESPN3		at Lamar	W 79–58	21–5 (14–0)	Montagne Center (1,931); Beaumont, TX
02/27/2016; 6:00 pm, ESPN3		Houston Baptist	W 82–54	22–5 (15–0)	William R. Johnson Coliseum (6,012); Nacogdoches, TX
02/29/2016; 6:00 pm, ASN		at Incarnate Word	W 84–58	23–5 (16–0)	McDermott Center (876); San Antonio, TX
03/03/2016; 7:00 pm		at Northwestern State	W 95–55	24–5 (17–0)	Prather Coliseum (3,020); Natchitoches, LA
03/05/2016; 7:00 pm, ESPNCE		at Sam Houston State	W 85–64	25–5 (18–0)	Bernard Johnson Coliseum (2,091); Huntsville, TX
Southland tournament
03/11/2016; 5:00 pm, ESPN3	(1)	vs. (4) Houston Baptist; Semifinals	W 104–68	26–5	Merrell Center (3,019); Katy, TX
03/12/2016; 8:30 pm, ESPN2	(1)	vs. (2) Texas A&M–Corpus Christi; Championship	W 82–60	27–5	Merrell Center (4,399); Katy, TX
NCAA tournament
03/18/2016*; 6:10 PM, CBS	(14 E)	vs. (3 E) No. 8 West Virginia; First Round	W 70–56	28–5	Barclays Center (17,502); Brooklyn, NY
03/20/2016*; 1:40 PM, CBS	(14 E)	vs. (6 E) Notre Dame; Second Round	L 75–76	28–6	Barclays Center (17,401); Brooklyn, NY
*Non-conference game. ^{#}Rankings from AP Poll. (#) Tournament seedings in parentheses. E=East Region. All times are in Central Time.

== See also ==
- 2015–16 Stephen F. Austin Ladyjacks basketball team
- List of vacated and forfeited games in college basketball
