= 2015–16 Lamar Cardinals basketball team =

American college basketball season

2015–16 Lamar Cardinals basketball
- Conference: Southland Conference
- Record: 11–19 (3–15 Southland)
- Head coach: Tic Price (2nd season)
- Assistant coaches: Anthony Anderson (2nd season); Bobby Kummer (2nd season); Brian Burton (2nd season)
- Home arena: Montagne Center (Capacity 10,080)

2015–16 Southland Conference men's basketball standings
	Conf.				Overall
Team	W		L	PCT	W		L	PCT
Stephen F. Austin †	18	–	0	1.000	28	–	6	.824
Texas A&M–CC	15	–	3	.833	25	–	8	.758
Sam Houston State	12	–	6	.667	18	–	16	.529
Incarnate Word*	12	–	6	.667	17	–	12	.586
Houston Baptist	10	–	8	.556	17	–	17	.500
Southeastern Louisiana	9	–	9	.500	12	–	21	.364
Abilene Christian*	8	–	10	.444	13	–	18	.419
McNeese State	7	–	11	.389	9	–	20	.310
Central Arkansas**	6	–	12	.333	7	–	21	.250
New Orleans	6	–	12	.333	10	–	20	.333
Nicholls State	6	–	12	.333	11	–	23	.324
Northwestern State	5	–	13	.278	8	–	20	.286
Lamar	3	–	15	.167	11	–	19	.367
† 2016 Southland tournament winner * Ineligible for postseason during transition to Division I ** Ineligible for postseason due to APR violations

The 2015–16 Lamar Cardinals basketball team represented Lamar University during the 2015–16 NCAA Division I men's basketball season. The Cardinals were led by second year head coach Tic Price. The team played their home games at the Montagne Center in Beaumont, Texas and are members of the Southland Conference. The Cardinals finished the season with a record of 11–19, 3–15 to finish in last place in conference. As a result, they failed to qualify for the Southland tournament.

== Previous season ==
The Cardinals were picked to finish 10th in the conference in both the Coaches' Poll and the Sports Information Director polls. The Cardinals finished the season 15–15, 9–9 in Southland play to finish in sixth place. Due to APR penalties, the Cardinals were not eligible for postseason play, including the Southland tournament.

== Preseason ==
The Cardinals were picked to finish fifth (5th) in the conference in the Coaches' Poll and sixth (6th) in the Sports Information Director polls.

== Roster ==
2015–16 Lamar Cardinals men's basketball team
Players
Coaches

Pos.	#	Name	Height	Weight	Year	Hometown
PG	0	Kevin Booze	5 ft 11 in (1.8 m)	185 lb (84 kg)	Fr	Irving, TX
F	2	Dorian Chapman	6 ft 7 in (2.01 m)	224 lb (102 kg)	Fr	Port Arthur, TX
G	3	Nick Garth	6 ft 0 in (1.83 m)	185 lb (84 kg)	Fr	Houston, TX
C	4	LeMon Gregory	6 ft 9 in (2.06 m)	251 lb (114 kg)	Sr	Greenville, KY / Angelina College
G	5	Lincoln Davis	6 ft 1 in (1.85 m)	173 lb (78 kg)	Jr	Pittsburgh, PA / South Plains College
F	11	Josh Nzeakor	6 ft 7 in (2.01 m)	207 lb (94 kg)	Fr	Mesquite, TX
G	12	Zjori Bosha	6 ft 5 in (1.96 m)	173 lb (78 kg)	So	Nome, TX
C	14	Christian Kennedy	6 ft 11 in (2.11 m)	202 lb (92 kg)	Jr	Warner Robins, GA / Daytona State College
C	15	Terrance Hubby	6 ft 5 in (1.96 m)	191 lb (87 kg)	Fr	Arlington, TX
G/F	20	Marcus Owens	6 ft 2 in (1.88 m)	193 lb (88 kg)	Jr	Fort Lauderdale, FL
F	21	Boaz Williams	6 ft 6 in (1.98 m)	197 lb (89 kg)	Fr	Houston, TX
G	22	Preston Mattingly	6 ft 2 in (1.88 m)	204 lb (93 kg)	Jr	Evansville, IN
F	23	Dontavious Sears	6 ft 3 in (1.91 m)	184 lb (83 kg)	Sr	Memphis, TN / Eastern Oklahoma State College
G	24	Quan Jones	6 ft 3 in (1.91 m)	168 lb (76 kg)	Sr	Little Rock, AR / Connors State College

Head coach

- Tic Price (Virginia Tech)

Assistant coach(es)

- Anthony Anderson (McNeese State)
- Bobby Kummer (Charlotte)
- Brian Burton (UT Dallas)

Legend

- (C) Team captain
- (S) Suspended
- (I) Ineligible
- (W) Walk-on
- Injured
- Current redshirt

Roster
Last update: 2015-12-06

== Media ==
All 2015 Lamar Cardinals home games except those otherwise contracted for through were broadcast online live by Big Red Sports Network (BRSN). Starting January 4, 2016 all home games except for the January 11, 2016 game will be broadcast on ESPN3. The January 11 game will be broadcast on the ASN.

== Schedule and results ==
Season Results:

Date time, TV	Opponent	Result	Record	High points	High rebounds	High assists	Site (attendance) city, state
Out of Conference
11/13/2015*; 7:00 pm, BRSN	Austin College	W 101–58	1–0	17 – Owens, M.	13 – Owens, M.	7 – Booze, K.	Montagne Center (937); Beaumont, TX
11/16/2015*; 9:00 pm, MW Net	at Fresno State; Roundball Showcase	L 72–80	1–1	20 – Booze, K.	9 – Chatman, D.	4 – Booze, K.	Save Mart Center (4,799); Fresno, CA
11/21/2015*; 11:00 am	at Delaware State; Roundball Showcase	W 77–66	2–1	18 – Davis, L.; Garth, N.	7 – Chatman, D.	9 – Davis, L.	Memorial Hall (209); Dover, DE
11/25/2015*; 7:00 pm, ASN	at Rice; Roundball Showcase	L 82–94	2–2	25 – Booze, K.	7 – Mattingly, P.	5 – Booze, K.	Tudor Fieldhouse (1,376); Houston, TX
11/29/2015*; 2:00 pm, BRSN	UC Riverside; Roundball Showcase	L 69–74	2–3	16 – Nzeakor, J.	8 – Sears, D.	4 – Booze, K.	Montagne Center (1,481); Beaumont, TX
12/2/2015*; 7:00 pm, TWCS Alt.	UTRGV	W 83–60	3–3	21 – Garth, N.	10 – Sears, D.	3 – Three players	Montagne Center (1,766); Beaumont, TX
12/05/2015*; 8:00 pm, BRSN	Idaho State	W 82–70	4–3	21 – Gregory, L.	11 – Gregory, L.	5 – Booze, K.	Montagne Center (2,137); Beaumont, TX
12/12/2015*; 1:00 pm, ESPN3	at Liberty	W 73–58	–	22 – Garth, N.	5 – Davis, L.	8 – Booze, K.	Vines Center (1,990); Lynchburg, VA
12/13/2015*; 2:00 pm, ESPN3	at Virginia Tech	L 53–88	5–4	12 – Owens, M; Garth, N	7 – Mattingly, P	3 – Booze, K; Garth, N	Cassell Coliseum (4,870); Blacksburg, VA
12/18/2015*; 12:00 pm, BRSN	Jarvis Christian	W 80–56	6–4	24 – Sears, D.	16 – Mattingly, P.	6 – Owens, M.	Montagne Center (1,377); Beaumont, TX
12/21/2015*; 7:00 pm, BRSN	Texas Lutheran	W 86–69	7–4	15 – Davis, L.	7 – Mattingly, P.	7 – Jones, Q.	Montagne Center (1,592); Beaumont, TX
12/29/2015*; 7:00 pm, BRSN	Howard Payne	W 97–74	8–4	23 – Chatman, D.	7 – Gregory, L.	5 – Garth, N.	Montagne Center (1,695); Beaumont, TX
Conference Games
01/02/2016; 3:30 pm	at Nicholls State	W 79–67	9–4 (1–0)	17 – Garth, N.	9 – Chatman, D.	6 – Booze, K.	Stopher Gym (792); Thibodaux, LA
01/04/2016; 7:30 pm, ESPN3	New Orleans	L 64–68	9–5 (1–1)	15 – Garth, N.	11 – Sears, D.	4 – Booze, K.	Montagne Center (1,731); Beaumont, TX
01/9/2016; 4:00 pm	at Central Arkansas	L 76–93	9–6 (1–2)	16 – Garth, N.	13 – Sears, D.	3 – Garth, N.	Farris Center (1,225); Conway, AR
01/11/2016; 7:00 pm, ASN	Texas A&M–Corpus Christi	L 82–91	9–7 (1–3)	25 – Garth, N.	10 – Sears, D.	4 – Mattingly, P.; Garth, N.	Montagne Center (1,539); Beaumont, TX
01/16/2016; 4:40 pm, ESPN3	Northwestern State	W 86–82	10–7 (2–3)	19 – Sears, D.; Garth, N.	15 – Nzeakor, j.	10 – Booze, K.	Montagne Center (1,825); Beaumont, TX
01/18/2016; 7:00 pm	at Southeastern Louisiana	L 70–98	10–8 (2–4)	15 – Booze, K.	8 – Nzeakor, J.	4 – Booze, K.	University Center (641); Hammond, LA
01/23/2016; 4:30 pm, ESPN3	Houston Baptist	L 79–92	10–9 (2–5)	18 – Owens, M.	6 – Owens, M.	5 – Booze, K.	Montagne Center (2,312); Beaumont, TX
01/25/2016; 7:00 pm, ESPN3	at Stephen F. Austin	L 52–86	10–10 (2–6)	12 – Garth, N.	6 – Owens, M.	4 – Booze, K.	William R. Johnson Coliseum (2,485); Nacogdoches, TX
01/30/2016; 4:00 pm	at Abilene Christian	L 71–80	10–11 (2–7)	24 – Chatman, D.	9 – Nzeakor, J.	2 – Booze, K.	Moody Coliseum (2,103); Abilene, TX
02/01/2016; 7:00 pm, ESPN3	Sam Houston State	L 66–69	10–12 (2–8)	12 – 3 players	6 – Nzeakor, J.	3 – Mattingly, P.	Montagne Center (2,076); Beaumont, TX
02/06/2016; 4:30 pm, ESPN3	Incarnate Word	L 71–74	10–13 (2–9)	14 – Garth, N.	13 – Nzeakor, J.	4 – Garth, N.; Jones, Q.	Montagne Center (2,128); Beaumont, TX
02/08/2016; 7:00 pm, ESPN3	Abilene Christian	L 67–71	10–14 (2–10)	20 – Garth, N.	6 – Mattingly, P.	3 – Davis, L.	Montagne Center (1,743); Beaumont, TX
02/15/2016; 7:00 pm	at Houston Baptist	L 78–79	10–15 (2–11)	17 – Booze, K.	9 – Chatman, D.	11 – Booze, K.	Sharp Gymnasium (703); Houston, TX
02/20/2016; 6:00 pm	at McNeese State	W 87–76	11–15 (3–11)	21 – Owens, M.	8 – Nzeakor, J.	5 – Booze, K.	Burton Coliseum (1,403); Lake Charles, LA
02/22/2016; 7:00 pm, ESPN3	Stephen F. Austin	L 58–79	11–16 (3–12)	11 – Nzeakor, J.	6 – Chatman, D.	– Booze, K.	Montagne Center (1,931); Beaumont, TX
02/27/2016; 4:30 pm, TWCS	at Incarnate Word	L 70–89	11–17 (3–13)	22 – Mattingly, P.	5 – Nzeakor, J.	4 – Garth, N.	McDermott Convocation Center (824); San Antonio, TX
02/29/2016; 7:00 pm, ESPN3	McNeese State	L 74–77	11–18 (3–14)	14 – Three players	12 – Mattingly, P.	5 – Garth, N.	Montagne Center (2,143); Beaumont, TX
03/03/2016; 6:30 pm	at Sam Houston State	L 76–94	11–19 (3–15)	17 – Booze, K.	5 – Bosha, Z.	– Booze, K.	Bernard Johnson Coliseum (1,257); Huntsville, TX
*Non-conference game. ^{#}Rankings from AP Poll. (#) Tournament seedings in parentheses. All times are in Central Time.

== See also ==
- 2015–16 Lamar Lady Cardinals basketball team
