= 2015–16 Sam Houston State Bearkats men's basketball team =

American college basketball season

2015–16 Sam Houston State Bearkats men's basketball

CIT, First round
- Conference: Southland Conference
- Record: 18–16 (12–6 Southland)
- Head coach: Jason Hooten (6th season)
- Assistant coaches: Chris Mudge (6th season); Matt Braeuer (3rd season); Omar Lowery (1st season)
- Home arena: Bernard Johnson Coliseum

2015–16 Southland Conference men's basketball standings
	Conf.				Overall
Team	W		L	PCT	W		L	PCT
Stephen F. Austin †	18	–	0	1.000	28	–	6	.824
Texas A&M–CC	15	–	3	.833	25	–	8	.758
Sam Houston State	12	–	6	.667	18	–	16	.529
Incarnate Word*	12	–	6	.667	17	–	12	.586
Houston Baptist	10	–	8	.556	17	–	17	.500
Southeastern Louisiana	9	–	9	.500	12	–	21	.364
Abilene Christian*	8	–	10	.444	13	–	18	.419
McNeese State	7	–	11	.389	9	–	20	.310
Central Arkansas**	6	–	12	.333	7	–	21	.250
New Orleans	6	–	12	.333	10	–	20	.333
Nicholls State	6	–	12	.333	11	–	23	.324
Northwestern State	5	–	13	.278	8	–	20	.286
Lamar	3	–	15	.167	11	–	19	.367
† 2016 Southland tournament winner * Ineligible for postseason during transition to Division I ** Ineligible for postseason due to APR violations

The 2015–16 Sam Houston State Bearkats men's basketball team represented Sam Houston State University during the 2015–16 NCAA Division I men's basketball season. The Bearkats, led by sixth year head coach Jason Hooten, played their home games at the Bernard Johnson Coliseum and were members of the Southland Conference. They finished the season 18–16, 12–6 in Southland play to finish in a tie for third place. They defeated Nicholls State in the quarterfinals of the Southland tournament to advance to the semifinals where they lost to Texas A&M–Corpus Christi. They were invited to the CollegeInsider.com Tournament where they lost in the first round to Jackson State.

== Preseason ==
The Bearkats were picked to finish fourth (4th) in both the Southland Conference Coaches' Poll and the Sports Information Directors Poll.

== Roster ==
2015–16 Sam Houston State Bearkats men's basketball team
Players
Coaches

Pos.	#	Name	Height	Weight	Year	Previous school	Hometown
G/F	0	Albert Almanza	6 ft 6 in (1.98 m)	195 lb (88 kg)	Fr	Saint Stephens	Austin, TX
G	1	Ameer Jackson	6 ft 4 in (1.93 m)	185 lb (84 kg)	Jr	Evelyn Mack Academy/Dodge CC	Concord, NC
G	3	Cameron Delaney (redshirt)	6 ft 4 in (1.93 m)	200 lb (91 kg)	So	Harker Heights/Denver	Harker Heights, TX
G	3	Dakrai Henderson	6 ft 2 in (1.88 m)	192 lb (87 kg)	So	Dawson HS	Pearland, TX
G	4	Jovante Spivey	6 ft 0 in (1.83 m)	165 lb (75 kg)	RS Jr	Savannah/South Georgia St	Savannah, GA
F	5	Jesse Lopez	6 ft 7 in (2.01 m)	205 lb (93 kg)	So	Bowie	El Paso, TX
G	11	Jalin Barnes	6 ft 1 in (1.85 m)	180 lb (82 kg)	Jr	Christian Faith/Barton County CC	Raleigh, NC
F/C	13	Aurimas Majauskas	6 ft 8 in (2.03 m)	228 lb (103 kg)	Jr	Future Prep	Marijampolė, Lithuania
G	15	Josh Delaney	6 ft 0 in (1.83 m)	173 lb (78 kg)	RS Fr	Harker Heights HS	Killeen, TX
G	20	Jamal Williams	6 ft 4 in (1.93 m)	190 lb (86 kg)	So	Episcopal HS	Houston, TX
G	21	Paul Baxter	6 ft 2 in (1.88 m)	205 lb (93 kg)	Sr	Bowie HS	Austin, TX
C	23	Andre Sands	6 ft 81 in (3.89 m)	242 lb (110 kg)	Jr	Bel Air - Kansas/Sun Rise Christian	Freeport, Bahamas
C	33	Marc Andre Fortin	6 ft 9 in (2.06 m)	230 lb (104 kg)	Fr	Cegep De Sainte-Foy	Quebec City, Quebec Canada

Head coach

- Jason Hooten (Tarleton State)

Assistant coach(es)

- Chris Mudge (Texas)
- Matt Braeuer (Wichita State)
- Omar Lowery (Concordia (WI))

Legend

- (C) Team captain
- (S) Suspended
- (I) Ineligible
- (W) Walk-on
- Injured
- Current redshirt

Roster
Last update: 2015-11-20

== Schedule ==
Source: Access Date: November 15, 2015

Date time, TV	Opponent	Result	Record	Site (attendance) city, state
Non-Conference regular season
11/14/2015*; 7:00 pm, ESPN3	at SMU	L 50–85	0–1	Moody Coliseum (6,892); Dallas, TX
11/172015*; 6:30 pm	St. Thomas	W 114–92	1–1	Bernard Johnson Coliseum (1,402); Huntsville, TX
11/21/2015*; 1:00 pm	Southern Illinois	L 81–86 ^{OT}	1–2	Bernard Johnson Coliseum; Huntsville, TX
11/23/2015*; 10:00 pm, P12	at No. 14 California; Las Vegas Invitational	L 63–89	1–3	Haas Pavilion (8,492); Berkeley, CA
11/27/2015*; 1:30 pm	vs. Bethune–Cookman; Las Vegas Invitational	W 71–46	2–3	Orleans Arena (N/A); Las Vegas, NV
11/29/2015*; 6:30 pm	Wiley College	L 66–67	2–4	Bernard Johnson Coliseum (687); Huntsville, TX
12/02/2015*; 8:00 pm, FSSW+	at Texas Tech	L 56–71	2–5	United Spirit Arena (6,545); Lubbock, TX
12/06/2015*; 2:00 pm	Sul Ross	W 100–61	3–5	Bernard Johnson Coliseum (739); Huntsville, TX
12/14/2015*; 6:30 pm	LeTourneau	W 96–54	4–5	Bernard Johnson Coliseum (629); Huntsville, TX
12/18/2015*; 6:00 pm	at LIU Brooklyn	W 75–69	5–5	Wellness, Recreation & Athletics Center (1,231); Brooklyn, NY
12/21/2015*; 6:00 pm	vs. UC Irvine; Sun Bowl Invitational	L 53–63	5–6	Don Haskins Center (7,746); El Paso, TX
12/22/2015*; TBA	at UTEP; Sun Bowl Invitational	L 68–87	5–7	Dan Haskins Center (5,946); El Paso, TX
12/29/2015*; 8:00 pm	at North Texas	L 64–69	5–8	UNT Coliseum (1,906); Denton, TX
Southland regular season
01/02/2016; 4:30 pm	at Incarnate Word	W 78–72	6–8 (1–0)	McDermott Center (809); San Antonio, TX
01/04/2016; 7:00 pm	at Northwestern State	W 94–79	7–8 (2–0)	Prather Coliseum (1,223); Natchitoches, LA
01/09/2016; 4:30 pm	New Orleans	W 73–70	8–8 (3–0)	Bernard Johnson Coliseum (580); Huntsville, TX
01/11/2016; 6:30 pm	Southeastern Louisiana	W 70–63	9–8 (4–0)	Bernard Johnson Coliseum (796); Huntsville, TX
01/16/2016; 3:00 pm	at McNeese State	L 68–72	9–9 (4–1)	Burton Coliseum (453); Lake Charles, LA
01/18/2016; 6:30 pm	Nicholls State	W 87–76	10–9 (5–1)	Bernard Johnson Coliseum (1,260); Huntsville, TX
01/23/2016; 6:00 pm, ESPN3	at Stephen F. Austin	L 64–76	10–10 (5–2)	William R. Johnson Coliseum (7,123); Natchitoches, LA
01/25/2016; 6:00 pm, ASN	Abilene Christian	W 72–51	11–10 (6–2)	Bernard Johnson Coliseum (1,051); Huntsville, TX
01/30/2016; 7:00 pm	at Houston Baptist	L 69–70	11–11 (6–3)	Sharp Gymnasium (1,075); Houston, TX
02/01/2016; 7:00 pm, ESPN3	at Lamar	W 69–66	12–11 (7–3)	Montagne Center (2,076); Beaumont, TX
02/06/2016; 7:00 pm, RTSW	at Texas A&M–Corpus Christi	L 48–51	12–12 (7–4)	American Bank Center (3,713); Corpus Christi, TX
02/13/2016; 4:30 pm	Houston Baptist	W 80–68	13–12 (8–4)	Bernard Coliseum (1,172); Huntsville, TX
02/15/2016; 7:30 pm	at Abilene Christian	W 84–71	14–12 (9–4)	Moody Coliseum (1,075); Abilene, TX
02/20/2016; 4:30 pm	Central Arkansas	W 105–75	15–12 (10–4)	Bernard Johnson Coliseum (2,139); Huntsville, TX
02/27/2016; 7:00 pm, ESPN3	Texas A&M–Corpus Christi	L 70–75	15–13 (10–5)	Bernard Johnson Coliseum (1,217); Huntsville, TX
02/29/2016; 4:00 pm	at Central Arkansas	W 83–73	16–13 (11–5)	Farris Center (748); Conway, AR
03/03/2016; 6:30 pm	Lamar	W 94–76	17–13 (12–5)	Bernard Johnson Coliseum (1,257); Huntsville, TX
03/05/2016; 7:00 pm	Stephen F. Austin	L 64–85	17–14 (12–6)	Bernard Johnson Coliseum (2,091); Huntsville, TX
Southland tournament
03/10/2016; 7:30 pm	vs. Nicholls State; Quarterfinals	W 60–59	18–14	Merrell Center (1,298); Katy, TX
03/11/2016; 7:30 pm	vs. Texas A&M–Corpus Christi; Semifinals	L 76–79	18–15	Merrell Center (3,019); Katy, TX
CIT
03/14/2016*; 6:30 pm	Jackson State; First round	L 77–81 ^{OT}	18–16	Bernard Johnson Coliseum (376); Huntsville, TX
*Non-conference game. (#) Tournament seedings in parentheses. All times are in Central Time.

== See also ==
- 2015–16 Sam Houston State Bearkats women's basketball team
