= 2015–16 Texas A&M–Corpus Christi Islanders men's basketball team =

American college basketball season

2015–16 Texas A&M–Corpus Christi Islanders men's basketball

CIT, First round
- Conference: Southland Conference
- Record: 25–8 (15–3 Southland)
- Head coach: Willis Wilson (5th season)
- Assistant coaches: Marty Gross; Mark Dannhoff; Yaphett King
- Home arena: American Bank Center (Capacity: 8,280); Dugan Wellness Center

2015–16 Southland Conference men's basketball standings
| | Conf. | | | | Overall |
| Team | W | | L | PCT | W | | L | PCT |
|---|---|---|---|---|---|---|---|---|
| Stephen F. Austin † | 18 | – | 0 | 1.000 | 28 | – | 6 | .824 |
| Texas A&M–CC | 15 | – | 3 | .833 | 25 | – | 8 | .758 |
| Sam Houston State | 12 | – | 6 | .667 | 18 | – | 16 | .529 |
| Incarnate Word* | 12 | – | 6 | .667 | 17 | – | 12 | .586 |
| Houston Baptist | 10 | – | 8 | .556 | 17 | – | 17 | .500 |
| Southeastern Louisiana | 9 | – | 9 | .500 | 12 | – | 21 | .364 |
| Abilene Christian* | 8 | – | 10 | .444 | 13 | – | 18 | .419 |
| McNeese State | 7 | – | 11 | .389 | 9 | – | 20 | .310 |
| Central Arkansas** | 6 | – | 12 | .333 | 7 | – | 21 | .250 |
| New Orleans | 6 | – | 12 | .333 | 10 | – | 20 | .333 |
| Nicholls State | 6 | – | 12 | .333 | 11 | – | 23 | .324 |
| Northwestern State | 5 | – | 13 | .278 | 8 | – | 20 | .286 |
| Lamar | 3 | – | 15 | .167 | 11 | – | 19 | .367 |
† 2016 Southland tournament winner * Ineligible for postseason during transition to Division I ** Ineligible for postseason due to APR violations

The 2015–16 Texas A&M–Corpus Christi Islanders men's basketball team represented Texas A&M University–Corpus Christi in the 2015–16 NCAA Division I men's basketball season. This was head coach Willis Wilson's fifth season at Texas A&M–Corpus Christi. The Islanders were members of the Southland Conference and played their home games at the American Bank Center and the Dugan Wellness Center. They finished the season 25–8, 15–3 in Southland play to finish in second place. They defeated Sam Houston State to advance to the championship game of the Southland tournament where they lost to Stephen F. Austin. They received an invite to the CollegeInsider.com Tournament where they lost in the first round to Louisiana–Lafayette.

== Preseason ==
The Islanders were picked to finish third (3rd) in both the Southland Conference Coaches' Poll and the Sports Information Director Poll.

== Media ==
Texas A&M–Corpus Christi men's basketball airs on KKTX with Steven King on the call all season long. Video streaming of all non-televised home games is available at GoIslanders.com.

== Roster ==
2015–16 Texas A&M–Corpus Christi Islanders men's basketball team
Players
Coaches

| Pos. | # | Name | Height | Weight | Year | Previous school | Hometown |
|---|---|---|---|---|---|---|---|
| G | 0 | Brandon Pye | 6 ft 0 in (1.83 m) | 175 lb (79 kg) | Sr | Timberview HS | Mansfield, TX |
| G | 1 | Hameed Ali | 6 ft 2 in (1.88 m) | 180 lb (82 kg) | RS Sr | San Leandro HS | Hayward, CA |
| G | 2 | Cole Martinez | 6 ft 2 in (1.88 m) | 185 lb (84 kg) | Sr | Air Force Academy Prep | San Antonio, TX |
| G | 3 | Joe Kilgore | 6 ft 5 in (1.96 m) | 185 lb (84 kg) | So | Dekaney HS | Spring, TX |
| G | 4 | Ehab Amin | 6 ft 3 in (1.91 m) | 200 lb (91 kg) | So | St. John's Military Academy | Alexandria, Egypt |
| F | 5 | T. J. Traylor | 6 ft 8 in (2.03 m) | 215 lb (98 kg) | Sr | Dominguez HS | Los Angeles, CA |
| G | 10 | Kyle Brown | 5 ft 10 in (1.78 m) | 150 lb (68 kg) | Fr | Ridge Point | Fresno, TX |
| G | 11 | Jelani Currie | 6 ft 4 in (1.93 m) | 190 lb (86 kg) | Sr | Albany Academy | Albany, NY |
| G | 15 | David Bloom | 6 ft 4 in (1.93 m) | 205 lb (93 kg) | So | Prince of Peace Christian High School | Plano, TX |
| G | 22 | Emmanuel Toney | 6 ft 2 in (1.88 m) | 185 lb (84 kg) | Jr | Annapolis Area Christian | Annapolis, MD |
| F | 23 | Bryce Douvier | 6 ft 7 in (2.01 m) | 235 lb (107 kg) | RS Sr | Sedgwick HS; Northern Colorado | Sedgwick, KS |
| F | 25 | Rashawn Thomas | 6 ft 8 in (2.03 m) | 230 lb (104 kg) | Jr | Southeast HS | Oklahoma City, OK |
| F | 31 | Viktor Juricek | 6 ft 11 in (2.11 m) | 220 lb (100 kg) | Sr | Canarias Basketball Academy | Prievidza, Slovakia |
| F | 34 | Dale Francis | 6 ft 8 in (2.03 m) | 260 lb (118 kg) | Sr | Canarias Basketball Academy | Leighton Buzzard, England |

Head coach

- Willis Wilson (Rice)

Assistant coach(es)

- Marty Gross (Jacksonville)
- Mark Dannhoff (UW–La Crosse)
- Yaphett King (Cal State Fullerton)

Legend

- (C) Team captain
- (S) Suspended
- (I) Ineligible
- (W) Walk-on
- Injured
- Current redshirt

Roster
Last update: 2015-11-20

== Schedule and results ==
| Date time, TV | Opponent | Result | Record | Site (attendance) city, state |
Exhibition
| 11/07/2015*; 9:28 pm | St. Mary's University, Texas | W 94–63 | | Dugan Wellness Center (904); Corpus Christi, TX |
Non-conference regular season
| 11/13/2015*; 9:40 pm | Our Lady of the Lake | W 94–72 | 1–0 | American Bank Center (1,045); Corpus Christi, TX |
| 11/19/2015*; 7:00 pm, SECN+ | at Texas A&M; Battle 4 Atlantis | L 70–95 | 1–1 | Reed Arena (5,392); College Station, TX |
| 11/21/2015*; 7:00 pm, LHN | at Texas; Battle 4 Atlantis | L 56–67 | 1–2 | Frank Erwin Center (11,315); Austin, TX |
| 11/23/2015*; 7:30 pm | St. Edward's University | W 78–50 | 2–2 | American Bank Center (868); Corpus Christi, TX |
| 11/26/2015*; 3:30 pm | vs. Furman; Battle 4 Atlantis | W 73–69 | 3–2 | Alumni Gym (611); Elon, NC |
| 11/27/2015*; 7:05 pm | vs. Elon; Battle 4 Atlantis | W 85–81 | 4–2 | Alumni Gym (847); Elon, NC |
| 12/02/2015*; 7:00 pm | Austin Peay | W 61–48 | 5–2 | American Bank Center (948); Corpus Christi, TX |
| 12/05/2015*; 7:00 pm, TWCS | Texas State | W 47–39 | 6–2 | American Bank Center (1,586); Corpus Christi, TX |
| 12/12/2015*; 2:00 pm, TWCS | at UTSA | W 85–79 | 7–2 | Convocation Center (704); San Antonio, TX |
| 12/15/2015*; 8:00 pm, BTN | Wisconsin | L 49–64 | 7–3 | Kohl Center (17,287); Madison, WI |
| 12/20/2015*; 7:00 pm | Cal Poly | W 80–74 | 8–3 | American Bank Center (917); Corpus Christi, TX |
| 12/28/2015*; 7:00 pm | Austin Peay | W 74–70 | 9–3 | Dunn Center (1,345); Clarksville, TN |
Southland regular season
| 01/05/2016; 7:30 pm | Central Arkansas | W 94–82 | 10–3 (1–0) | American Bank Center (837); Corpus Christi, TX |
| 01/09/2016; 3:00 pm | at McNeese State | W 77–68 | 11–3 (2–0) | Burton Coliseum (520); Lake Charles, LA |
| 01/11/2016; 7:00 pm, ASN | at Lamar | W 91–82 | 12–3 (3–0) | Montagne Center (1,539); Beaumont, TX |
| 01/16/2016; 7:00 pm | Nicholls State | W 76–71 | 13–3 (4–0) | American Bank Center (1,247); Corpus Christi, TX |
| 01/19/2016; 3:30 pm | at Northwestern State | W 89–79 | 14–3 (5–0) | Prather Coliseum (1,620); Natchitoches, LA |
| 01/23/2016; 7:00 pm | New Orleans | W 97–76 | 15–3 (6–0) | American Bank Center (1,708); Corpus Christi, TX |
| 01/26/2016; 8:00 pm, CBSSN | Southeastern Louisiana | W 73–63 | 16–3 (7–0) | American Bank Center (1,906); Corpus Christi, TX |
| 01/30/2016; 2:00 pm, ESPN3 | Stephen F. Austin | L 61–66 | 16–4 (7–1) | American Bank Center (2,348); Corpus Christi, TX |
| 02/02/2016; 7:00 pm, TWCS | at Incarnate Word | L 65–70 | 16–5 (7–2) | McDermott Center (1,230); San Antonio, TX |
| 02/06/2016; 7:00 pm, RTSW | Sam Houston State; Homecoming | W 51–48 | 17–5 (8–2) | American Bank Center (3,713); Corpus Christi, TX |
| 02/08/2016; 8:00 pm, ASN | Houston Baptist | W 83–76 | 18–5 (9–2) | American Bank Center (1,038); Corpus Christi, TX |
| 02/13/2016; 6:00 pm, ESPN3 | at Stephen F. Austin | L 58–70 | 18–6 (9–3) | William R. Johnson Coliseum (6,264); Nacogdoches, TX |
| 02/15/2016; 7:00 pm | at New Orleans | W 65–57 | 19–6 (10–3) | Lakefront Arena (332); New Orleans, LA |
| 02/20/2016; 7:00 pm | Incarnate Word | W 90–69 | 20–6 (11–3) | Dugan Wellness Center (1,422); Corpus Christi, TX |
| 02/23/2016; 7:00 pm | Abilene Christian | W 65–59 | 21–6 (12–3) | American Bank Center (1,428); Corpus Christi, TX |
| 02/27/2016; 7:00 pm, ESPN3 | at Sam Houston State | W 75–70 | 22–6 (13–3) | Bernard Johnson Coliseum (1,217); Huntsville, TX |
| 03/03/2016; 7:30 pm | at Houston Baptist | W 81–71 | 23–6 (14–3) | Sharp Gymnasium (957); Houston, TX |
| 03/05/2016; 4:00 pm | at Abilene Christian | W 74–69 | 24–6 (15–3) | Moody Coliseum (1,363); Abilene, TX |
Southland tournament
| 03/11/2016; 7:30 pm, ESPN3 | vs. Sam Houston State; Semifinal | W 79–76 | 25–6 | Merrell Center (3,019); Katy, TX |
| 03/12/2016; 8:30 pm, ESPN2 | vs. Stephen F. Austin; Championship game | L 60–82 | 25–7 | Merrell Center (4,399); Katy, TX |
CIT
| 03/16/2016*; 7:00 pm | at Louisiana–Lafayette; First round | L 72–96 | 25–8 | Cajundome (1,205); Lafayette, LA |
*Non-conference game. (#) Tournament seedings in parentheses.

== See also ==
- 2015–16 Texas A&M–Corpus Christi Islanders women's basketball team
