= 2015–16 McNeese State Cowboys basketball team =

American college basketball season

2015–16 McNeese State Cowboys basketball
- Conference: Southland Conference
- Record: 8–21 (6–12 Southland)
- Head coach: Dave Simmons (10th season)
- Assistant coaches: David Dumars; Steve Welch; Preston David
- Home arena: Burton Coliseum (Capacity: 8,000)

2015–16 Southland Conference men's basketball standings
	Conf.				Overall
Team	W		L	PCT	W		L	PCT
Stephen F. Austin †	18	–	0	1.000	28	–	6	.824
Texas A&M–CC	15	–	3	.833	25	–	8	.758
Sam Houston State	12	–	6	.667	18	–	16	.529
Incarnate Word*	12	–	6	.667	17	–	12	.586
Houston Baptist	10	–	8	.556	17	–	17	.500
Southeastern Louisiana	9	–	9	.500	12	–	21	.364
Abilene Christian*	8	–	10	.444	13	–	18	.419
McNeese State	7	–	11	.389	9	–	20	.310
Central Arkansas**	6	–	12	.333	7	–	21	.250
New Orleans	6	–	12	.333	10	–	20	.333
Nicholls State	6	–	12	.333	11	–	23	.324
Northwestern State	5	–	13	.278	8	–	20	.286
Lamar	3	–	15	.167	11	–	19	.367
† 2016 Southland tournament winner * Ineligible for postseason during transition to Division I ** Ineligible for postseason due to APR violations

The 2015–16 McNeese State Cowboys basketball team represented McNeese State University during the 2015–16 NCAA Division I men's basketball season. The Cowboys were led by tenth year head coach Dave Simmons and played their home games at Burton Coliseum. The Cowboys were members of the Southland Conference. They finished the season with a record of 8–21, 6–12 in Southland play to finish in eighth place. They lost to Nicholls State in the first round of the Southland tournament.

== Preseason ==
The Cowboys were picked to finish tenth (10th) in both the Southland Conference Coaches' Poll and eighth (8th) in the Sports Information Directors Poll.

== Roster ==
2015–16 McNeese State Cowboys men's basketball team
Players
Coaches

Pos.	#	Name	Height	Weight	Year	Previous school	Hometown
G	0	Shaun Johnson	5 ft 10 in (1.78 m)	175 lb (79 kg)	Sr	Pineville HS	Pineville, LA
G	1	Jamaya Burr	6 ft 0 in (1.83 m)	175 lb (79 kg)	Jr	Ruston HS	Ruston, LA
G	2	James Harvey	6 ft 2 in (1.88 m)	170 lb (77 kg)	Fr	Amite HS	Amite, LA
F	3	Richard Laku	6 ft 8 in (2.03 m)	170 lb (77 kg)	Fr	Sachse HS	Dallas, TX
G	5	Kevin Ross	6 ft 3 in (1.91 m)	185 lb (84 kg)	RS Fr	Ontario Christian HS	Chino Hills, CA
G	10	Jarren Greenwood	6 ft 2 in (1.88 m)	175 lb (79 kg)	Fr	Bellaire HS	Houston, TX
C	13	Matthew Moss	6 ft 9 in (2.06 m)	212 lb (96 kg)	Sr	Charis Preparatory (Louisiana); Louisiana-Lafayette	Anacoco, LA
G	14	Andrija Milovanovic	6 ft 5 in (1.96 m)	210 lb (95 kg)	So	Koledz Beograd HS	Belgrade, Serbia
	15	Craig McFerrin	6 ft 7 in (2.01 m)	250 lb (113 kg)	Sr	Warren Harding HS	Baton Rouge, LA
G/F	21	Tevin Jackson	6 ft 7 in (2.01 m)	210 lb (95 kg)	Jr	Willettson Senior HS; Jacksonville College	Perth, Western Australia
G	23	Derrell Joubert	6 ft 1 in (1.85 m)	185 lb (84 kg)	So	Northwest HS	Opelousas, LA
G/F	24	Lance Potier	6 ft 6 in (1.98 m)	200 lb (91 kg)	Jr	St. Martinville HS	St. Martinville, LA
F	30	Adrian Brown	6 ft 7 in (2.01 m)	210 lb (95 kg)	Fr	Northshore HS	Houston, TX
G	31	Stephen Ugochukwu	6 ft 7 in (2.01 m)	220 lb (100 kg)	So	Argyle Liberty Christian	Lewisville, TX
F	44	Austin Lewis	6 ft 8 in (2.03 m)	235 lb (107 kg)	Sr	Westfield HS	Houston, TX

Head coach

- Dave Simmons

Assistant coach(es)

- David Dumars
- Steve Welch
- Preston David

Legend

- (C) Team captain
- (S) Suspended
- (I) Ineligible
- (W) Walk-on
- Injured
- Current redshirt

Roster
Last update: 2015-12-05

== Schedule and results ==
Date time, TV	Opponent	Result	Record	Site (attendance) city, state
Non-Conference regular season
November 13, 2015*; 8:00 pm	at No. 21 LSU	L 70–81	0–1	Pete Maravich Assembly Center (11,679); Baton Rouge, LA
November 17, 2015*; 7:00 pm	Louisiana College	L 70–73	0–2	Burton Coliseum; Lake Charles, LA
November 20, 2015*; 7:00 pm	at No. 8 Oklahoma	L 56–85	0–3	Lloyd Noble Center (8,364); Norman, OK
November 25, 2015*; 2:00 pm	Dillard	W 80–79	1–3	Burton Coliseum; Lake Charles, LA
November 28, 2015*; 3:00 pm, Root	Texas State	L 67–70	1–4	Burton Coliseum (N/A); Lake Charles, LA
November 30, 2015*; 6:00 pm	at Central Michigan	L 73–74	1–5	McGuirk Arena (2,153); Mount Pleasant, MI
September 12, 2015*; 7:00 pm	at Louisiana–Lafayette	L 64–97	1–6	CajunDome (3,571); Lafayette, LA
December 12, 2015*; 6:30 pm, BTN	at Indiana	L 60–105	1–7	Assembly Hall (17,472); Bloomington, IN
December 16, 2015*; 7:30 pm	LSU–Alexandria	W 77–72	2–7	Burton Coliseum; Lake Charles, LA
December 22, 2015*; 10:00 pm, Pac-12	at UCLA	L 53–67	2–8	Pauley Pavilion (6,499); Los Angeles
December 29, 2015*; 7:00 pm	Jarvis Christian			Burton Coliseum; Lake Charles, LA
Southland regular season
February 1, 2016; 6:00 pm, ESPN3	at Stephen F. Austin	L 57–86	2–9 (0–1)	William R. Johnson Coliseum (2,284); Nacogdoches, TX
May 1, 2016; 7:00 pm	at Houston Baptist	L 73–82	2–10 (0–2)	Sharp Gymnasium (657); Houston, TX
September 1, 2016; 3:00 pm	Texas A&M–Corpus Christi	L 68–77	2–11 (0–3)	Burton Coliseum (520); Lake Charles, LA
January 16, 2016; 3:00 pm	Sam Houston State	W 72–68	3–11 (1–3)	Burton Coliseum (453); Lake Charles, LA
January 19, 2016; 7:00 pm	at Abilene Christian	L 67–75	3–12 (1–4)	Moody Coliseum (1,619); Abilene, TX
January 23, 2016; 3:00 pm	Northwestern State	W 75–74	4–12 (2–4)	Burton Coliseum (1,231); Lake Charles, LA
January 25, 2016; 7:00 pm	Incarnate Word	W 79–76 ^{OT}	5–12 (3–4)	Burton Coliseum (401); Lake Charles, LA
January 30, 2016; 6:15 pm	at New Orleans	L 64–76	5–13 (3–5)	Lakefront Arena (1,108); New Orleans, LA
January 2, 2016; 7:00 pm	at Southeastern Louisiana	L 80–82	5–14 (3–6)	University Center (1,030); Hammond, LA
June 2, 2016; 3:30 pm	at Nicholls State	L 56–71	5–15 (3–7)	Stopher Gym (592); Thibodaux, LA
November 2, 2016; 7:00 pm	New Orleans	W 87–76	6–15 (4–7)	Burton Coliseum (302); Lake Charles, LA
February 13, 2016; 3:00 pm, ESPN3	at Northwestern State	L 78–87	6–16 (4–8)	Prather Coliseum (1,837); Natchitoches, LA
February 15, 2016; 8:00 pm, ASN	Southeastern Louisiana	L 76–79	6–17 (4–9)	Burton Coliseum (350); Lake Charles, LA
February 20, 2010; 3:00 pm	Lamar	L 76–87	6–18 (4–10)	Burton Coliseum (1,403); Lake Charles, LA
February 22, 2016; 7:00 pm	Central Arkansas	L 82–88	6–19 (4–11)	Burton Coliseum (331); Lake Charles, LA
February 27, 2016; 3:00 pm	Nicholls State	W 71–69 ^{OT}	7–19 (5–11)	Burton Coliseum (N/A); Lake Charles, LA
February 29, 2016; 7:00 pm, ESPN3	at Lamar	W 77–74	8–19 (6–11)	Montagne Center (2,143); Beaumont, TX
May 3, 2016; 4:00 pm	at Central Arkansas	L 77–85	8–20 (6–12)	Farris Center (823); Conway, AR
Southland tournament
September 3, 2016; Nicholls State	vs. Nicholls State; First round	L 90–94 ^{2OT}	8–21	Merrell Center (1,077); Katy, TX
*Non-conference game. ^{#}Rankings from AP Poll. (#) Tournament seedings in parentheses. All times are in Central Time.

== See also ==
- 2015–16 McNeese State Cowgirls basketball team
