= 2015–16 Southland Conference men's basketball season =

- League: NCAA Division I
- Sport: Basketball
- Duration: November, 2015 - March, 2016
- Teams: 13
- TV partner(s): ESPN, ASN

Regular Season
- Season champions: Stephen F. Austin
- Runners-up: Texas A&M–Corpus Christi
- Season MVP: Thomas Walkup (Stephen F. Austin)
- Top scorer: Zeek Woodley (Northwestern State)

Tournament
- Champions: Stephen F. Austin
- Runners-up: Texas A&M–Corpus Christi
- Finals MVP: Thomas Walkup (Stephen F. Austin)

Southland Conference men's basketball seasons
- ← 2014–15 2016–17 →

2015–16 Southland Conference men's basketball standings
	Conf.				Overall
Team	W		L	PCT	W		L	PCT
Stephen F. Austin †	18	–	0	1.000	28	–	6	.824
Texas A&M–CC	15	–	3	.833	25	–	8	.758
Sam Houston State	12	–	6	.667	18	–	16	.529
Incarnate Word*	12	–	6	.667	17	–	12	.586
Houston Baptist	10	–	8	.556	17	–	17	.500
Southeastern Louisiana	9	–	9	.500	12	–	21	.364
Abilene Christian*	8	–	10	.444	13	–	18	.419
McNeese State	7	–	11	.389	9	–	20	.310
Central Arkansas**	6	–	12	.333	7	–	21	.250
New Orleans	6	–	12	.333	10	–	20	.333
Nicholls State	6	–	12	.333	11	–	23	.324
Northwestern State	5	–	13	.278	8	–	20	.286
Lamar	3	–	15	.167	11	–	19	.367
† 2016 Southland tournament winner * Ineligible for postseason during transition to Division I ** Ineligible for postseason due to APR violations

The 2015–16 SLC men's basketball season was the 53rd season of Southland Conference basketball, taking place between November 2015 and March 2016. Practices began in October 2015, and the season ended with the 2016 Southland Conference men's basketball tournament.

== Preseason ==
=== Preseason Polls ===
==== Coaches Poll ====
Rank	Team
1	Stephen F. Austin
2	Northwestern State
3	Texas A&M–Corpus Christi
4	Sam Houston State
5	Lamar
6	Incarnate Word
7	Southeastern Louisiana
8	New Orleans
9	Houston Baptist
10	McNeese State
11	Nicholls State
12	Central Arkansas
13	Abilene Christian

==== Sports Information Directors' Poll ====
Rank	Team
1	Stephen F. Austin
2	Northwestern State
3	Texas A&M–Corpus Christi
4	Sam Houston State
5	Incarnate Word
6	Lamar
7	Southeastern Louisiana
8	McNeese State
9	Houston Baptist
10	New Orleans
11	Nicholls State
12	Central Arkansas
13	Abilene Christian

=== Preseason All-Conference Teams ===
Award	Recipients
First Team	Thomas Walkup (Stephen F. Austin) Jalen West (Northwestern State); Zeek Woodley (Northwestern State); Rashawn Thomas (Texas A&M–Corpus Christi); Paul Baxter (Sam Houston State)
Second Team	Ty Charles (Stephen F. Austin) Zay Jackson (Southeastern Louisiana); Craig McFerrin (McNeese State); Kyle Hittle (Incarnate Word); Anthony Odunsi (Houston Baptist)

Southland Conference Preseason Player of the Year: Thomas Walkup, Stephen F. Austin

== Regular season ==
=== Head coaches ===
Note: Stats shown are before the beginning of the season. Overall and SLC records are from time at current school.

Team	Head coach	Previous job	Seasons at school	Overall record	SLC record	NCAA Tournaments
Abilene Christian	Joe Golding	Arkansas–Little Rock	5th	45–71	6–26	0
Central Arkansas	Russ Pennell	Grand Canyon	2nd	0–2	2–16	0
Houston Baptist	Ron Cottrell	Arkansas	25th	18–41	9–27	0
Incarnate Word	Ken Burmeister	Trinity	10th	39–17	19–13	1
Lamar	Tic Price	North Texas	2nd	16–19	10–13	2
McNeese State	Dave Simmons	Northwestern State	10th	127–152	80–79	0
New Orleans	Mark Slessinger	Northwestern State	5th	22–33	14–22	0
Nicholls State	J. P. Piper	Nicholls (assistant)	12th	121–201	76–106	0
Northwestern State	Mike McConathy	Bossier Parish CC	17th	259–240	157–117	3
Sam Houston State	Jason Hooten	Tarleton State	6th	99–69	53–33	0
Southeastern Louisiana	Jay Ladner	Jones County JC	2nd	9–23	6–12	0
Stephen F. Austin	Brad Underwood	South Carolina	3rd	61–8	35–1	2
Texas A&M–Corpus Christi	Willis Wilson	Memphis	5th	50–77	36–34	0

== Postseason ==
=== Southland Conference tournament ===
- March 9–12, 2016: Southland Conference Men's Basketball Tournament, Leonard E. Merrill Center, Katy, Texas

=== NCAA tournament ===
- The winner of the conference tournament will be awarded an automatic bid to the NCAA Division I Basketball Tournament.

== Awards and honors ==
=== Regular season ===
==== SLC Player-of-the-Week ====
- Nov. 16 – Jalan West (Northwestern State)
- Nov. 23 – Thomas Walkup (Stephen F. Austin)
- Nov. 31 – Rashawn Thomas (Texas A&M-Corpus Christi)
- Dec. 7 – Rashawn Thomas (Texas A&M-Corpus Christi)
- Dec. 14 – Rashawn Thomas (Texas A&M-Corpus Christi)
- Dec. 21 – Jontrell Walker (Incarnate Word)
- Dec. 28 – Ja'Donte' Frye (Nicholls)
- Jan. 4 – Anthony Odunsi (Houston Baptist)
- Jan. 11 – Rashawn Thomas (Texas A&M-Corpus Christi)
- Jan. 18 – Rashawn Thomas (Texas A&M-Corpus Christi)
- Jan. 25 – Demetrious Floyd (Stephen F. Austin)
- Feb. 1 – Kevin Hill (University of New Orleans)
- Feb. 8 – Jordan Howard (Central Arkansas)
- Feb. 15 – Zeek Woodley (Northwestern State)
- Feb. 22 –
- Mar. 1 –

=== Postseason ===
==== SLC All-Conference Teams and Awards ====
Award	Recipients
Coach of the Year	Brad Underwood (Stephen F. Austin)
Player of the Year	Thomas Walkup (Stephen F. Austin)
Defensive Player of the Year	Rashawn Thomas (Texas A&M-Corpus Christi)
Freshman of the Year	Jaylen Franklin (Abilene Christian)
Newcomer of the Year	Derreck Brooks (Central Arkansas)
First Team	Thomas Walkup (Stephen F. Austin); Rashawn Thomas (Texas A&M-Corpus Christi); Zeek Woodley (Northwestern State); Anthony Odunsi (Houston Baptist); Jordan Howard (Central Arkansas)
Second Team	Kyle Hittle (Incarnate Word); Jaylen Franklin (Abilene Christian); Demetrious Floyd (Stephen F. Austin); Aurimas Majauskas (Sam Houston State); Dakarai Henderson (Sam Houston State)
Third Team	Zay Jackson (Southeastern Louisiana); Jamaya Burr (McNeese State); Glide Geffrard (Stephen F. Austin); Hameed Ali (Texas A&M Corpus Christi); Christavious Gill (New Orleans)
All-Defensive Team	Rashawn Thomas (Texas A&M-Corpus Christi); Thomas Walkup (Stephen F. Austin); Hameed Ali (Texas A&M Corpus Christi); Liam Thomas (Nicholls State); Trey Pinkney (Stephen F. Austin)
First Team All-Academic	Kyle Hittle (Incarnate Word); Thomas Walkup (Stephen F. Austin); Jordan Howard (Central Arkansas); Aurimas Majauskas (Sam Houston State); Parker Wentz ( Abilene Christian)
Second Team All-Academic	Bryce Douvier (Texas A&M Corpus Christi); Sabri Thompson (Northwestern State); Mitchell Badillo (Incarnate Word); Reveal Chukwujekwu (Houston Baptist); Kevin Hill (New Orleans)
All-Tournament Team	Thomas Walkup (Stephen F. Austin); Jared Johnson (Stephen F. Austin); Michael Holyfield (Sam Houston State); Jabari Peters (Sam Houston State); Zeek Woodley (Northwestern State)
Tournament MVP	Thomas Walkup (Stephen F. Austin)
