= 2015–16 Houston Baptist Huskies men's basketball team =

American college basketball season

2015–16 Houston Baptist Huskies men's basketball
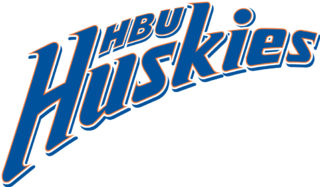

CBI, First round
- Conference: Southland Conference
- Record: 17–17 (10–8 Southland)
- Head coach: Ron Cottrell (25th season)
- Assistant coaches: Steven Key; Justin "Jud" Kinne; Jeremy Case
- Home arena: Sharp Gymnasium (Capacity: 1,000)

2015–16 Southland Conference men's basketball standings
	Conf.				Overall
Team	W		L	PCT	W		L	PCT
Stephen F. Austin †	18	–	0	1.000	28	–	6	.824
Texas A&M–CC	15	–	3	.833	25	–	8	.758
Sam Houston State	12	–	6	.667	18	–	16	.529
Incarnate Word*	12	–	6	.667	17	–	12	.586
Houston Baptist	10	–	8	.556	17	–	17	.500
Southeastern Louisiana	9	–	9	.500	12	–	21	.364
Abilene Christian*	8	–	10	.444	13	–	18	.419
McNeese State	7	–	11	.389	9	–	20	.310
Central Arkansas**	6	–	12	.333	7	–	21	.250
New Orleans	6	–	12	.333	10	–	20	.333
Nicholls State	6	–	12	.333	11	–	23	.324
Northwestern State	5	–	13	.278	8	–	20	.286
Lamar	3	–	15	.167	11	–	19	.367
† 2016 Southland tournament winner * Ineligible for postseason during transition to Division I ** Ineligible for postseason due to APR violations

The 2015–16 Houston Baptist Huskies men's basketball team represented Houston Baptist University in the 2015–16 NCAA Division I men's basketball season. This season was head coach Ron Cottrell's twenty-fifth season at HBU. The Huskies played their home games at the Sharp Gymnasium. They were members of the Southland Conference. They finished the season 17–17, 10–8 in Southland play to finish in fifth place. They defeated Southeastern Louisiana to advance to the semifinals of the Southland tournament where they lost to Stephen F. Austin. They were invited to the College Basketball Invitational where they lost in the first round to UNC Greensboro.

== Media ==
All Houston Baptist games will be broadcast online live by the Legacy Sports Network (LSN). LSN will also provide online video for every non-televised Huskies home game. However HBU games can air on ESPN3 as part of the Southland Conference TV packages.

== Preseason ==
The Huskies finished ninth in both the Southland Conference Coaches' Poll and the Sports Information Director's Poll.

== Roster ==
2015–16 Houston Baptist Huskies men's basketball team
Players
Coaches

Pos.	#	Name	Height	Weight	Year	Previous school	Hometown
G	2	Anthony Odunsi	6 ft 4 in (1.93 m)	205 lb (93 kg)	RS Sr	Travis; Utah/Tyler JC/Albany	Sugar Land, TX
G	3	Asa Cantwell	6 ft 3 in (1.91 m)	180 lb (82 kg)	Fr	Johnson	San Antonio, TX
C	4	Cody Stetler	6 ft 9 in (2.06 m)	235 lb (107 kg)	Jr	Hoisington	Hoisington, KS
F	5	Colter Lasher	6 ft 7 in (2.01 m)	215 lb (98 kg)	Jr	Dimond; Impact Prep	Anchorage, AK
G	10	Trey Patterson	6 ft 4 in (1.93 m)	180 lb (82 kg)	So	Plano East	Plano, TX
G/F	11	Caleb Crayton	6 ft 3 in (1.91 m)	205 lb (93 kg)	Sr	Northeast Academy	Oklahoma City, OK
G/F	12	Terry Harris	6 ft 6 in (1.98 m)	215 lb (98 kg)	So	Half Hollow Hills West	Dix Hills, NY
G	13	Stephen O'Suji	5 ft 10 in (1.78 m)	190 lb (86 kg)	So	Kinkaid	Houston, TX
G	14	Nic Thomas	6 ft 2 in (1.88 m)	180 lb (82 kg)	Fr	HSAA	Arlington, TX
G	15	Reveal Chukwujekwu	6 ft 3 in (1.91 m)	205 lb (93 kg)	Jr	Strake Jesuit	Houston, TX
G/F	23	Alex Fountain	6 ft 7 in (2.01 m)	210 lb (95 kg)	Jr	Wartburg Central	Wartburg, TN
G	24	Kyren Block	6 ft 6 in (1.98 m)	180 lb (82 kg)	Fr	Brennan	San Antonio, TX
G	25	Will Gates, Jr.	6 ft 1 in (1.85 m)	190 lb (86 kg)	Jr	Clemens; Furman	San Antonio, TX
G/F	30	Jourdan Stickler	6 ft 4 in (1.93 m)	180 lb (82 kg)	Sr	Annapolis High School; Morehead State/Blinn	Annapolis, MD
C	33	Isaiah Robinson	6 ft 10 in (2.08 m)	215 lb (98 kg)	Fr	Jefferson	Portland, OR
C	44	Josh Ibarra	6 ft 11 in (2.11 m)	250 lb (113 kg)	So	Angleton High School	Angleton, TX
G	55	Evan Anderson	6 ft 0 in (1.83 m)	170 lb (77 kg)	Fr	Bradford	Kenosha, WI

Head coach

- Ron Cottrell (Arkansas)

Assistant coach(es)

- Steven Key (Houston Baptist)
- Justin 'Jud' Kinne (Albion)
- Jeremy Case (Kansas)

Legend

- (C) Team captain
- (S) Suspended
- (I) Ineligible
- (W) Walk-on
- Injured
- Current redshirt

Roster
Last update: 2015-12-05

== Schedule and results ==
Date time, TV	Opponent	Result	Record	Site (attendance) city, state
Regular season
11/13/2015*; 7:00 pm, ESPN3	at New Mexico State	L 69–91	0–1	Pan American Center (5,130); Las Cruces, NM
11/16/2015*; 7:00 pm	Crowley's Ridge	W 102–62	1–1	Sharp Gymnasium (848); Houston, TX
11/19/2015*; 7:00 pm	at TCU; Cancún Challenge	L 63–90	1–2	Daniel–Meyer Coliseum (3,233); Fort Worth, TX
11/21/2015*; 7:30 pm	at Illinois State; Cancún Challenge	L 56–72	1–3	Redbird Arena (4,100); Normal, IL
11/24/2015*; 2:00 pm	vs. South Dakota State; Cancún Challenge	L 68–92	1–4	Hard Rock Hotel Riviera Maya (982); Cancún
11/25/2015*; 11:30 am	vs. Rider; Cancún Challenge	L 56–67	1–5	Hard Rock Hotel Riviera Maya (982); Cancún
12/02/2015*; 7:30 pm	Rice	W 77–73	2–5	Sharp Gymnasium (887); Houston, TX
12/05/2015*; 1:00 pm, ESPNU	at Michigan	L 57-82	2-6	Crisler Center (11,399); Ann Arbor, MI
12/12/2015*; 7:00 pm	Arlington Baptist	W 110–53	3–6	Sharp Gymnasium (542); Houston, TX
12/15/2015*; 7:30 pm	UC Riverside	W 72–59	4–6	Sharp Gymnasium (532); Houston, TX
12/19/2015*; 1:30 pm	at Arizona State	L 79–98	4–7	Wells Fargo Arena (4,573); Tempe, AZ
12/29/2015*; 7:00 pm	Ecclesia	W 101–47	5–7	Sharp Gymnasium (501); Houston, TX
01/02/2016; 3:00 pm	at Northwestern State	W 99–73	6–7 (1–0)	Prather Coliseum (1,218); Natchitoches, LA
01/05/2016; 7:00 pm	McNeese State	W 82–73	7–7 (2–0)	Sharp Gymnasium (657); Houston, TX
01/09/2016; 7:00 pm	Southeastern Louisiana	W 77–58	8–7 (3–0)	Sharp Gymnasium (621); Houston, TX
01/13/2016; 7:00 pm	Nicholls State	W 78–69	9–7 (4–0)	Sharp Gymnasium (517); Houston, TX
01/16/2016; 6:30 pm, ESPN3	at New Orleans	W 73–69	10–7 (5–0)	Lakefront Arena (1,066); New Orleans, LA
01/19/2016; 7:00 pm	at Central Arkansas	W 72–61	11–7 (6–0)	Farris Center; Conway, AR
01/23/2016; 6:00 pm, ESPN3	at Lamar	W 92–79	12–7 (7–0)	Montagne Center (2,312); Beaumont, TX
01/25/2016*; 7:00 pm	Hillsdale Free Will Baptist	W 109–84	13–7	Sharp Gymnasium (683); Houston, TX
01/30/2016; 7:00 pm	Sam Houston State	W 70–69	14–7 (8–0)	Sharp Gymnasium (1,075); Houston, TX
02/02/2016; 7:00 pm	at Abilene Christian	L 72–79	14–8 (8–1)	Moody Coliseum (1,226); Abilene, TX
02/06/2016; 7:00 pm	Stephen F. Austin	L 66–72	14–9 (8–2)	Sharp Gymnasium (1,082); Houston, TX
02/08/2016; 8:00 pm, ASN	at Texas A&M–Corpus Christi	L 76–83	14–10 (8–3)	American Bank Center (1,038); Corpus Christi, TX
02/13/2016; 7:00 pm	at Sam Houston State	L 68–80	14–11 (8–4)	Bernard Johnson Coliseum (1,172); Huntsville, TX
02/15/2016; 7:00 pm	Lamar	W 79–78	15–11 (9–4)	Sharp Gymnasium (703); Houston, TX
02/18/2016; 7:00 pm	Abilene Christian	W 73–71	16–11 (10–4)	Sharp Gymnasium (827); Houston, TX
02/22/2016; 7:00 pm	Incarnate Word	L 91–97	16–12 (10–5)	Sharp Gymnasium (818); Houston, TX
02/27/2016; 6:00 pm, ESPN3	at Stephen F. Austin	L 54–82	16–13 (10–6)	William R. Johnson Coliseum (6,012); Nacogdoches, TX
03/03/2016; 7:30 pm	Texas A&M–Corpus Christi	L 71–81	16–14 (10–7)	Sharp Gymnasium (957); Houston, TX
03/05/2016; 4:00 pm	at Incarnate Word	L 86–97	16–15 (10–8)	McDermott Center (1,058); San Antonio, TX
Southland tournament
03/10/2016; 5:00 pm, ESPN3	vs. Southeastern Louisiana; Quarterfinals	W 73–68	17–15	Merrell Center (1,298); Katy, TX
03/11/2016; 5:00 pm	vs. Stephen F. Austin; Semifinals	L 68–104	17–16	Merrell Center (3,019); Katy, TX
CBI
03/16/2016*; 6:00 pm	at UNC Greensboro; First round	L 65–69	17–17	Greensboro Coliseum (1,031); Greensboro, NC
*Non-conference game. ^{#}Rankings from AP Poll. (#) Tournament seedings in parentheses. All times are in Central.

== See also ==
- 2015–16 Houston Baptist Huskies women's basketball team
