= 2015–16 Nicholls State Colonels men's basketball team =

American college basketball season

2015–16 Nicholls State Colonels men's basketball
- Conference: Southland Conference
- Record: 11–23 (6–12 Southland)
- Head coach: J. P. Piper (12th season)
- Assistant coaches: Rennie Bailey; David Amata; Chris DeFelice
- Home arena: Stopher Gym (Capacity: 3,800)

2015–16 Southland Conference men's basketball standings
	Conf.				Overall
Team	W		L	PCT	W		L	PCT
Stephen F. Austin †	18	–	0	1.000	28	–	6	.824
Texas A&M–CC	15	–	3	.833	25	–	8	.758
Sam Houston State	12	–	6	.667	18	–	16	.529
Incarnate Word*	12	–	6	.667	17	–	12	.586
Houston Baptist	10	–	8	.556	17	–	17	.500
Southeastern Louisiana	9	–	9	.500	12	–	21	.364
Abilene Christian*	8	–	10	.444	13	–	18	.419
McNeese State	7	–	11	.389	9	–	20	.310
Central Arkansas**	6	–	12	.333	7	–	21	.250
New Orleans	6	–	12	.333	10	–	20	.333
Nicholls State	6	–	12	.333	11	–	23	.324
Northwestern State	5	–	13	.278	8	–	20	.286
Lamar	3	–	15	.167	11	–	19	.367
† 2016 Southland tournament winner * Ineligible for postseason during transition to Division I ** Ineligible for postseason due to APR violations

The 2015–16 Nicholls State Colonels men's basketball team represented Nicholls State University during the 2015–16 NCAA Division I men's basketball season. The Colonels, led by twelfth year head coach J. P. Piper, played their home games at Stopher Gym and were members of the Southland Conference. They finished the season with a record of 11–23, 6–12 to finish in a three-way tie for 9th place in conference. They beat McNeese State in the first round of the Southland tournament to advance to the quarterfinals where they lost to Sam Houston State.

On March 29, head coach J. P. Piper was fired. He finished at Nicholls State with a 12 year record of 132–224.

== Preseason ==
The Colonels were picked to finish eleventh (11th) in both the Southland Conference Coaches' Poll and the Sports Information Directors Poll.

== Roster ==
2015–16 Nicholls State Colonels men's basketball team
Players
Coaches

Pos.	#	Name	Height	Weight	Year	Previous school	Hometown
G	1	Marquis Nelson	6 ft 0 in (1.83 m)	185 lb (84 kg)	So	Helen Cox HS	New Orleans, LA
C	2	Kyle Caudill	7 ft 0 in (2.13 m)	209 lb (95 kg)		Boston College	Brea, CA
G	4	Cameron Burke	6 ft 4 in (1.93 m)	185 lb (84 kg)	Fr	Dutchtown HS	Dutchtown, LA
G	5	Tre O'neal	6 ft 1 in (1.85 m)	190 lb (86 kg)	Jr	Otero JC	Denver, CO
G	10	Zach Young	6 ft 1 in (1.85 m)	195 lb (88 kg)	So	Impact Academy	Wellington, New Zealand
F	11	Adam Ward	6 ft 5 in (1.96 m)	210 lb (95 kg)	Jr	Lee College	Houston, TX
G	12	Jaden Weldon	6 ft 1 in (1.85 m)	165 lb (75 kg)	Fr	Trinity Grammar School	Sydney, Australia
G	13	Jonathan Bell	6 ft 2 in (1.88 m)	170 lb (77 kg)	RS Jr	Garden City CC	Los Angeles, CA
F	14	Ja'Dante' Frye	6 ft 4 in (1.93 m)	190 lb (86 kg)	RS Jr	E.D. White HS	Thibodaux, LA
F	15	Sam McBeath	6 ft 7 in (2.01 m)	210 lb (95 kg)	RS Sr	Cambelltown HS	Sydney, Australia
F	20	Brett Weaver	5 ft 10 in (1.78 m)	185 lb (84 kg)	So	Ottawa	Canyon, TX
G	21	Shane Rillieux	6 ft 0 in (1.83 m)	180 lb (82 kg)	RS Sr	Brother Martin HS	New Orleans, LA
G	22	T. J. Carpenter	6 ft 4 in (1.93 m)	200 lb (91 kg)	Sr	Lakeside HS	Sibley, LA
G	23	Quinton Thomas	6 ft 2 in (1.88 m)	175 lb (79 kg)		Dunham HS	Baton Rouge, LA
F	24	Liam Thomas	7 ft 0 in (2.13 m)	200 lb (91 kg)	Jr	Central Private School	Sydney, Australia
	30	Robert Bissant	5 ft 10 in (1.78 m)	160 lb (73 kg)	So	Delago CC	New Orleans, LA
G	32	Davon Spencer	6 ft 5 in (1.96 m)	170 lb (77 kg)	So	Delago CC	New Orleans, LA
G	40	Stevie Repichowski	6 ft 5 in (1.96 m)	195 lb (88 kg)	Jr	Tulsa	Lansing, MI
F	44	Luka Kamber	6 ft 8 in (2.03 m)	215 lb (98 kg)	Jr	Louisiana-Lafayette	Berlin, Germany

Head coach

- J. P. Piper

Assistant coach(es)

- Rennie Bailey
- David Amata
- Chris DeFelice

Legend

- (C) Team captain
- (S) Suspended
- (I) Ineligible
- (W) Walk-on
- Injured
- Current redshirt

== Schedule ==
Date time, TV	Opponent	Result	Record	Site (attendance) city, state
Exhibition
11/9/2015*; 6:30 pm	Arkansas–Monticello	W 93–81	1–0	Stopher Gym; Thibodaux, LA
Regular season
11/15/2015*; 2:00 pm	at Florida State	L 62–109	0–1	Donald L. Tucker Civic Center (6,094); Tallahassee, FL
11/19/2015*; 6:30 pm	Mobile	W 80–58	1–1	Stopher Gym (489); Thibodaux, LA
11/23/2015*; 12:30 am	at Hawaii	L 74–99	1–2	Stan Sheriff Center (5,576); Honolulu, HI
11/25/2015*; 8:00 pm	at New Mexico	L 63–75	1–3	WisePies Arena (12,383); Albuquerque, NM
12/01/2015*; 6:30 pm	Louisiana College	W 80–62	2–3	Stopher Gym (698); Thibodaux, LA
12/05/2015*; 3:30 pm	Loyola	W 89–74	3–3	Stopher Gym (690); Thibodaux, LA
12/10/2015*; 9:00 pm	at San Diego State	L 47–84	3–4	Viejas Arena (12,414); San Diego, CA
12/14/2015*; 7:00 pm	at North Texas	L 60–78	3–5	UNT Coliseum; Denton, TX
12/16/2015*; 7:00 pm	at SMU; Las Vegas Classic	L 46–82	3–6	Moody Coliseum (6,460); University Park, TX
12/18/2015*; 8:00 pm	at Colorado; Las Vegas Classic	L 68–85	3–7	Coors Events Center (8,125); Boulder, CO
12/22/2015*; 2:00 pm	vs. Hampton; Las Vegas Classic	W 84–81	4–7	Orleans Arena; Paradise, NV
12/23/2015*; 4:00 pm	vs. Canisius; Las Vegas Classic	L 74–83	4–8	Orleans Arena; Paradise, NV
12/28/2015*; 1:00 pm	at Houston	L 49–76	4–9	Hofheinz Pavilion (3,403); Houston, TX
01/02/2016; 3:30 pm	Lamar	L 67–79	4–10 (0–1)	Stopher Gym (792); Thibodaux, LA
01/05/2016; 7:00 pm	at Memphis	L 46–82	4–11	FedExForum (10,290); Memphis, TN
01/09/2016; 3:40 pm	Abilene Christian	W 63–62	5–11 (1–1)	Stopher Gym (1,297); Natchitoches, LA
01/13/2016; 7:00 pm	at Houston Baptist	L 69–78	5–12 (1–2)	Sharp Gymnasium (517); Houston, TX
01/16/2016; 7:00 pm	at Texas A&M–Corpus Christi	L 71–76	5–13 (1–3)	American Bank Center (1,247); Corpus Christi, TX
01/18/2016; 6:30 pm	at Sam Houston State	L 76–87	5–14 (1–4)	Bernard Johnson Coliseum (1,260); Huntsville, TX
01/23/2016; 3:00 pm, ESPN3	Central Arkansas	L 83–94	5–15 (1–5)	Stopher Gym (1,567); Thibodaux, LA
01/25/2016; 6:30 pm	Northwestern State	L 80–88	5–16 (1–6)	Stopher Gym (2,147); Thibodaux, LA
01/30/2016; 4:30 pm	at Incarnate Word	L 61–68	5–17 (1–7)	McDermott Center (408); San Antonio, TX
02/01/2016; 7:00 pm	at New Orleans	L 53–74	5–18 (1–8)	Lakefront Arena (468); New Orleans, LA
02/06/2016; 3:30 pm	McNeese State	W 71–56	6–18 (2–8)	Stopher Gym (592); Thibodaux, LA
02/08/2016; 6:30 pm	Incarnate Word	W 71–60	7–18 (3–8)	Stopher Gym (561); Thibodaux, LA
02/13/2016; 4:00 pm	at Southeastern Louisiana	L 61–69	7–19 (3–9)	University Center (786); Hammond, LA
02/20/2016; 3:40 pm	Stephen F. Austin	L 53–88	7–20 (3–10)	Stopher Gym (522); Thibodaux, LA
02/22/2016; 6:30 pm	at Northwestern State	L 67–81	7–21 (3–11)	Prather Coliseum (1,923); Natchitoches, LA
02/27/2016; 3:00 pm	at McNeese State	L 69–71 ^{OT}	7–22 (3–12)	Burton Coliseum (N/A); Lake Charles, LA
02/29/2016; 6:30 pm	New Orleans	W 80–76	8–22 (4–12)	Stopher Gym (782); Thibodaux, LA
03/03/2016; 7:00 pm	at Central Arkansas	W 68–64	9–22 (5–12)	Farris Center (948); Conway, AR
03/05/2016; 3:30 pm	Southeastern Louisiana	W 64-45	10-22 (6-12)	Stopher Gym (901); Thibodaux, LA
Southland tournament
03/09/2016; 7:30 pm	vs. McNeese State; First round	W 94–90 ^{2OT}	11–22	Merrill Center (1,077); Katy, TX
03/10/2016; 7:30 pm	vs. Sam Houston State; Quarterfinals	L 59–60	11–23	Merrill Center (1,298); Katy, TX
*Non-conference game. ^{#}Rankings from AP Poll. (#) Tournament seedings in parentheses. All times are in Central Time.

== See also ==
- 2015–16 Nicholls State Colonels women's basketball team
