= 2015–16 New Orleans Privateers men's basketball team =

American college basketball season

2015–16 New Orleans Privateers men's basketball
- Conference: Southland Conference
- Record: 10–20 (6–12 Southland)
- Head coach: Mark Slessinger (5th season)
- Assistant coaches: Jody Bailey; Kris Arkenberg; Bill Duany
- Home arena: Lakefront Arena (Capacity: 10,000)

2015–16 Southland Conference men's basketball standings
	Conf.				Overall
Team	W		L	PCT	W		L	PCT
Stephen F. Austin †	18	–	0	1.000	28	–	6	.824
Texas A&M–CC	15	–	3	.833	25	–	8	.758
Sam Houston State	12	–	6	.667	18	–	16	.529
Incarnate Word*	12	–	6	.667	17	–	12	.586
Houston Baptist	10	–	8	.556	17	–	17	.500
Southeastern Louisiana	9	–	9	.500	12	–	21	.364
Abilene Christian*	8	–	10	.444	13	–	18	.419
McNeese State	7	–	11	.389	9	–	20	.310
Central Arkansas**	6	–	12	.333	7	–	21	.250
New Orleans	6	–	12	.333	10	–	20	.333
Nicholls State	6	–	12	.333	11	–	23	.324
Northwestern State	5	–	13	.278	8	–	20	.286
Lamar	3	–	15	.167	11	–	19	.367
† 2016 Southland tournament winner * Ineligible for postseason during transition to Division I ** Ineligible for postseason due to APR violations

The 2015–16 New Orleans Privateers men's basketball team represented the University of New Orleans during the 2015–16 NCAA Division I men's basketball season. The Privateers were led by fifth year head coach Mark Slessinger and played their home games at Lakefront Arena. They were members of the Southland Conference. They finished the season 10–20, 6–12 to finish in a three-way tie for ninth place Southland play. They lost to Southeastern Louisiana in the first round of the Southland tournament.

== Preseason ==
The Privateers were picked to finish eighth (8th) in the Southland Conference Coaches' Poll and tenth (10th) in the Sports Information Directors Poll.

== Roster ==
2015–16 New Orleans Privateers men's basketball team
Players
Coaches

Pos.	#	Name	Height	Weight	Year	Previous school	Hometown
G	0	Danny Cohen	6 ft 2 in (1.88 m)	190 lb (86 kg)	Fr	Natchitoches Central	Natchitoches, LA
G	1	Tevin Broyles	6 ft 4 in (1.93 m)	210 lb (95 kg)	Jr	Gautier HS	Gautier, MS
G	2	Coleman Edwards	6 ft 1 in (1.85 m)	170 lb (77 kg)	Fr	Fort Bend Clements	Sugar Land, TX
G	3	Nate Frye	6 ft 1 in (1.85 m)	210 lb (95 kg)	Jr	Houma Christian HS	Houma, LA
F	4	Kevin Hill	6 ft 7 in (2.01 m)	215 lb (98 kg)	Sr	John Ehret HS	Westwego, LA
G	5	Christavious Gill	5 ft 8 in (1.73 m)	168 lb (76 kg)	Jr	Alexandria HS	Alexandria, LA
G/F	11	Michael Zeno	6 ft 6 in (1.98 m)	215 lb (98 kg)	So	Westbrook HS	Beaumont, TX
F	14	Erik Thomas	6 ft 5 in (1.96 m)	215 lb (98 kg)	Jr	West Chapel; Baton Rouge CC	Wesley Chapel, FL
F	15	Cameron Reed	6 ft 5 in (1.96 m)	195 lb (88 kg)	Fr	Eastern	Louisville, KY
G/F	20	Evans Ganapamo	6 ft 5 in (1.96 m)	195 lb (88 kg)	Jr	Mandeville HS	France
G	23	Venijie Wallis	6 ft 3 in (1.91 m)	170 lb (77 kg)	Fr	Brother Martin	New Orleans, LA
G	24	Corey Vinson	6 ft 1 in (1.85 m)	170 lb (77 kg)	Fr	Salmen	Slidell, LA
F	25	Travin Thibodeaux	6 ft 8 in (2.03 m)	245 lb (111 kg)	So	Brusly HS	Plaquemine, LA
G	32	Matthew Jiles	5 ft 10 in (1.78 m)	155 lb (70 kg)	So	Phoenix	Braithwaite, LA
F	33	Lamine Mbodji	6 ft 8 in (2.03 m)	230 lb (104 kg)	Jr	St. Francis Catholic; Otero JC	Senegal Africa
C	45	Travis Avery	6 ft 8 in (2.03 m)	215 lb (98 kg)	Sr	Country Day	Algiers, LA

Head coach

- Mark Slessinger (Aurora)

Assistant coach(es)

- Jody Bailey (Louisville)
- Kris Arkenberg (Franklin (IN))
- Bill Duany (Indiana)

Legend

- (C) Team captain
- (S) Suspended
- (I) Ineligible
- (W) Walk-on
- Injured
- Current redshirt

Roster
Last update: 2015-12-05

== Schedule ==
Date time, TV	Opponent	Result	Record	Site (attendance) city, state
Out of Conference
11/14/2015*; 1:00 pm	at Bowling Green	L 61–79	0–1	Stroh Center (1,592); Bowling Green, OH
11/16/2015*; 6:00 pm	at Duquesne	L 75–95	0–2	Palumbo Center (1,016); Pittsburgh, PA
11/19/2015*; 7:45 pm	Pensacola Christian	W 94–57	1–2	Lakefront Arena (580); New Orleans, LA
11/25/2015*; 7:00 pm	at Bradley	W 64–51	2–2	Carver Arena (5,379); Peoria, IL
11/28/2015*; 7:00 pm, BTN	at Northwestern	L 63–90	2–3	Welsh–Ryan Arena (6,015); Evanston, IL
12/02/2015*; 7:00 pm	at Tulane	L 62–64	2–4	Devlin Fieldhouse (1,581); New Orleans, LA
12/05/2015*; 2:00 pm	at Ball State	L 52–66	2–5	John E. Worthen Arena (2,528); Muncie, IN
12/12/2015*; 6:15 pm	Williams Baptist College	W 83–66	3–5	Lakefront Arena (487); New Orleans, LA
12/16/2015*; 6:00 pm	at UMass	L 95–103 ^{OT}	3–6	William D. Mullins Memorial Center (4,273); Amherst, MA
12/21/2015*; 7:00 pm	at Louisiana–Lafayette	L 69–79	3–7	CajunDome (3,401); Lafayette, LA
12/29/2015*; 5:30 pm	Blue Mountain College	W 94–61	4–7	Lakefront Arena (412); New Orleans, LA
Conference Games
01/04/2016; 7:00 pm, ESPN3	at Lamar	W 68–64	5–7 (1–0)	Montagne Center (1,731); Beaumont, TX
01/9/2016; 4:30 pm	at Sam Houston State	L 70–73	5–8 (1–1)	Bernard Johnson Coliseum (580); Huntsville, TX
01/11/2016; 7:00 pm	Incarnate Word	L 68–71	5–9 (1–2)	Lakefront Arena (481); New Orleans, LA
01/16/2016; 6:45 pm	Houston Baptist	L 69–73	5–10 (1–3)	Lakefront Arena (1,066); New Orleans, LA
01/18/2016; 7:00 pm	Stephen F. Austin	L 58–82	5–11 (1–4)	Lakefront Arena (684); New Orleans, LA
01/23/2016; 7:00 pm	at Texas A&M–Corpus Christi	L 76–87	5–12 (1–5)	American Bank Center (1,708); Corpus Christi, TX
01/25/2016; 7:00 pm	Central Arkansas	W 94–83	6–12 (2–5)	Lakefront Arena (414); New Orleans, LA
01/30/2015; 6:15 pm	McNeese State	W 76–64	7–12 (3–5)	Lakefront Arena (1,108); New Orleans, LA
02/01/2016; 7:00 pm	Nicholls State	W 74–53	8–12 (4–5)	Lakefront Arena (468); New Orleans, LA
02/06/2016; 4:00 pm	at Central Arkansas	L 77–112	8–13 (4–6)	Farris Center (2,192); Conway, AR
02/11/2016; 7:00 pm	at McNeese State	L 76–87	8–14 (4–7)	Burton Coliseum (302); Lake Charles, LA
02/15/2016; 7:00 pm	Texas A&M–Corpus Christi	L 57–65	8–15 (4–8)	Lakefront Arena (332); New Orleans, LA
02/20/2016; 3:00 pm	at Northwestern State	W 102–99	9–15 (5–8)	Prather Coliseum (1,928); Natchitoches, LA
02/23/2016; 7:00 pm	at Southeastern Louisiana	L 81–93	9–16 (5–9)	University Center (734); Hammond, LA
02/27/2016; 4:00 pm	at Abilene Christian	L 84–87	9–17 (5–10)	Moody Coliseum (1,987); Abilene, TX
02/29/2016; 6:30 pm	at Nicholls State	L 76–80	9–18 (5–11)	Stopher Gym (782); Thibodaux, LA
03/03/2016; 7:45 pm	Southeastern Louisiana	L 60–61	9–19 (5–12)	Lakefront Arena (684); New Orleans, LA
03/05/2016; 6:15 pm	Northwestern State	W 97–86	10–19 (6–12)	Lakefront Arena (866); New Orleans, LA
Southland tournament
03/09/2016; 5:00 pm	vs. Southeastern Louisiana; First round	L 74–84	10–20	Merrell Center (1,077); Katy, TX
*Non-conference game. ^{#}Rankings from AP Poll. (#) Tournament seedings in parentheses. All times are in Central Time.

== See also ==
- 2015–16 New Orleans Privateers women's basketball team
