= 2015–16 Southeastern Louisiana Lions basketball team =

American college basketball season

2015–16 Southeastern Louisiana Lions basketball
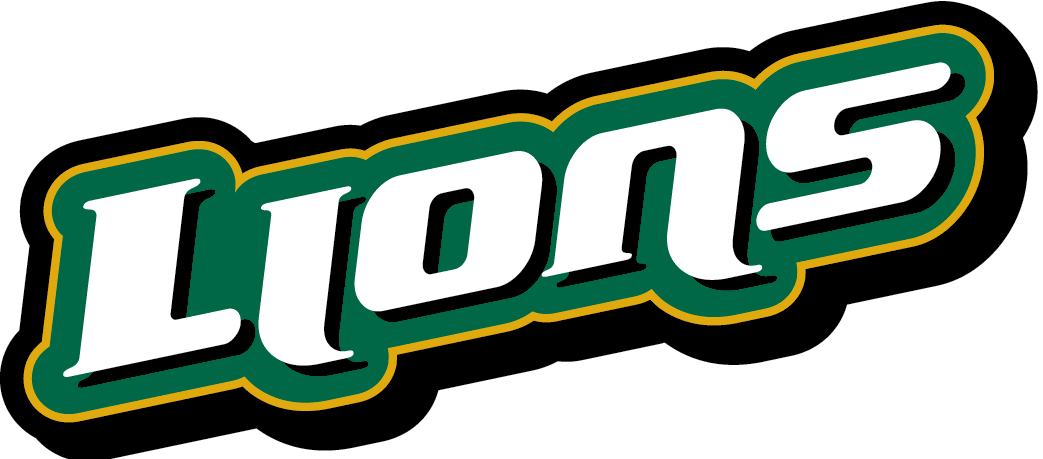
- Conference: Southland Conference
- Record: 12–21 (9–9 Southland)
- Head coach: Jay Ladner (2nd season)
- Assistant coaches: Errol Gauff; Kyle Roane; David Kiefer
- Home arena: University Center (Capacity: 7,500)

2015–16 Southland Conference men's basketball standings
	Conf.				Overall
Team	W		L	PCT	W		L	PCT
Stephen F. Austin †	18	–	0	1.000	28	–	6	.824
Texas A&M–CC	15	–	3	.833	25	–	8	.758
Sam Houston State	12	–	6	.667	18	–	16	.529
Incarnate Word*	12	–	6	.667	17	–	12	.586
Houston Baptist	10	–	8	.556	17	–	17	.500
Southeastern Louisiana	9	–	9	.500	12	–	21	.364
Abilene Christian*	8	–	10	.444	13	–	18	.419
McNeese State	7	–	11	.389	9	–	20	.310
Central Arkansas**	6	–	12	.333	7	–	21	.250
New Orleans	6	–	12	.333	10	–	20	.333
Nicholls State	6	–	12	.333	11	–	23	.324
Northwestern State	5	–	13	.278	8	–	20	.286
Lamar	3	–	15	.167	11	–	19	.367
† 2016 Southland tournament winner * Ineligible for postseason during transition to Division I ** Ineligible for postseason due to APR violations

The 2015–16 Southeastern Louisiana Lions basketball team represented Southeastern Louisiana University during the 2015–16 NCAA Division I men's basketball season. The Lions, led by second year head coach Jay Ladner, played their home games at the University Center and were members of the Southland Conference. They finished the season 12–21, 9–9 in Southland play to finish in sixth place. They defeated New Orleans in the first round of the Southland tournament to advance to the quarterfinals where they lost to Houston Baptist.

== Preseason ==
The Lions were picked to finish seventh (7th) in both the Southland Conference Coaches' Poll and the Sports Information Directors Poll.

== Roster ==
2015–16 Southeastern Louisiana Lions men's basketball team
Players
Coaches

Pos.	#	Name	Height	Weight	Year	Previous school	Hometown
G	0	Marlain Veal	5 ft 9 in (1.75 m)	145 lb (66 kg)	Fr	Helen Cox HS	New Orleans, LA
F	1	Jordan Capps	6 ft 7 in (2.01 m)	220 lb (100 kg)	Jr	Peachtree Ridge HS; Northwest Florida State College	Norcross, GA
G	2	Dimi Cook	6 ft 2 in (1.88 m)	183 lb (83 kg)	RS Fr	Gulfport HS	Gulfport, MS
G	3	Joshua Filmore	6 ft 0 in (1.83 m)	175 lb (79 kg)	Jr	Wekiva HS	Orlando, FL
C	4	Dominic Nelson	6 ft 10 in (2.08 m)	250 lb (113 kg)	Jr	Wings Academy; Southwest Tennessee CC	Harlem, NY
G	5	JaMichael Hawkins	6 ft 4 in (1.93 m)	200 lb (91 kg)	RS Sr	Wingfield HS; Mississippi Gulf Coast CC	Raymond, MS
G	10	Zay Jackson	6 ft 0 in (1.83 m)	178 lb (81 kg)	Sr	St. Thomas Aquinas HS; Murray State	Hammond, LA
G	11	Keith Charleston	6 ft 8 in (2.03 m)	207 lb (94 kg)	Jr	Jacksonville HS; Northwest Florida State College	Little Rock, AR
G	12	Malcolm Reid	5 ft 2 in (1.57 m)	140 lb (64 kg)	Jr	St. Stanislaus College	Diamondhead, MS
F	13	Moses Greenwood	6 ft 7 in (2.01 m)	221 lb (100 kg)	Fr	Velma Jackson HS	Sharon, MS
F	20	Bret Barclay	6 ft 6 in (1.98 m)	210 lb (95 kg)	So	Crown Point HS	Crown Point, IN
G	21	Jabbar Singleton	5 ft 11 in (1.8 m)	190 lb (86 kg)	Jr	Brother Martin HS; Oral Roberts	New Orleans, LA
G	22	Jerrod Rigby	6 ft 0 in (1.83 m)	160 lb (73 kg)	Fr	St. Stanislaus College	Bay St. Louis, MS
F	23	James Currington	6 ft 7 in (2.01 m)	195 lb (88 kg)	RS So	Paul W. Bryant HS; Mississippi Valley State	Tuscaloosa, AL
F	44	Byron Smith	6 ft 8 in (2.03 m)	280 lb (127 kg)	Sr	Colony HS; Citrus College	Ontario, CA

Head coach

- Jay Ladner

Assistant coach(es)

- Errol Gauff
- Kyle Roane
- David Kiefer

Legend

- (C) Team captain
- (S) Suspended
- (I) Ineligible
- (W) Walk-on
- Injured
- Current redshirt

Roster
Last update: 11/15/2015

== Schedule ==
Date time, TV	Opponent	Result	Record	Site (attendance) city, state
Exhibition
10/28/2015*; 7:00 pm	LSU–Alexandria	L 68–82		University Center (965); Hammond, LA
11/04/2015*; 7:00 pm	Xavier of Louisiana	W 79–61		University Center (765); Hammond, LA
Non-conference
11/13/2015*; 8:30 pm	at TCU	L 77–90	0–1	University Recreation Center (3,341); Fort Worth, TX
11/16/2015*; 7:00 pm	at Texas A&M	L 58–100	0–2	Reed Arena (4,903); College Station, TX
11/18/2015*; 7:00 pm	Mississippi College	W 76–69	1–2	University Center (810); Hammond, LA
11/22/2015*; 6:00 pm, BTN	at Nebraska; Barclays Center Classic	L 65–92	1–3	Pinnacle Bank Arena (15,533); Lincoln, NE
11/24/2015*; 6:00 pm, FSO/ESPN3	at No. 24 Cincinnati; Barclays Center Classic	L 49–64	1–4	Fifth Third Arena (6,824); Cincinnati, OH
11/27/2015*; 4:00 pm	vs. Gardner–Webb; Barclays Center Classic	L 68–77	1–5	Christl Arena (885); West Point, NY
11/28/2015*; 4:00 pm	vs. Arkansas–Pine Bluff; Barclays Center Classic	L 60-62	1–6	Christl Arena; West Point, NY
12/01/2015*; 7:00 pm	Loyola New Orleans	W 101–65	2–6	University Center (737); Hammond, LA
12/04/2015*; 7:00 pm	Southern	L 69–73	2–7	University Center (1,506); Hammond, LA
12/13/2015*; 2:00 pm	at Florida State	L 58–75	2–8	Donald L. Tucker Civic Center (4,992); Tallahassee, FL
12/15/2015*; 7:00 pm	Florida A&M	L 64–67	2–9	Teaching Gym (383); Tallahassee, FL
12/21/2015*; 6:00 pm	at Georgia Tech	L 62–75	2–10	Hank McCamish Pavilion (4,563); Atlanta, GA
12/30/2015*; 7:30 pm	at Jackson State	L 66–89	2–11	Williams Assembly Center (703); Jackson, MS
Southland regular season
01/04/2016; 7:00 pm	Stephen F. Austin	L 69–89	2–12 (0–1)	University Center (540); Hammond, LA
01/09/2016; 7:00 pm	at Houston Baptist	L 58–77	2–13 (0–2)	Sharp Gymnasium (621); Houston, TX
01/11/2016; 6:30 pm	at Sam Houston State	L 63–70	2–14 (0–3)	Bernard Johnson Coliseum (796); Huntsville, TX
01/16/2016; 4:00 pm	Incarnate Word	L 71–75	2–15 (0–4)	University Center (644); Hammond, LA
01/18/2016; 7:00 pm	at Lamar	W 98–70	3–15 (1–4)	University Center (641); Hammond, LA
01/26/2016; 7:00 pm	at Texas A&M–Corpus Christi	L 63–73	3–16 (1–5)	American Bank Center (1,906); Corpus Christi, TX
01/30/2016; 3:00 pm	at Northwestern State	L 76–91	3–17 (1–6)	Prather Coliseum (1,920); Natchitoches, LA
02/01/2016; 7:00 pm	McNeese State	W 82–80	4–17 (2–6)	University Center (1,030); Hammond, LA
02/06/2016; 4:00 pm	Abilene Christian	W 81–60	5–17 (3–6)	University Center (763); Hammond, LA
02/09/2016; 7:00 pm	at Central Arkansas	L 72–88	5–18 (3–7)	Farris Center (513); Conway, AR
02/13/2016; 8:00 pm	Nicholls State	W 69–61	6–18 (4–7)	University Center (786); Hammond, LA
02/15/2016; 8:00 pm	at McNeese State	W 79–76	7–18 (5–7)	Burton Coliseum (350); Lake Charles, LA
02/21/2016; 7:00 pm	at Abilene Christian	L 80–91	7–19 (5–8)	Abilene Christian (1,065); Abilene, TX
02/23/2016; 7:00 pm	New Orleans	W 91–83	8–19 (6–8)	University Center (734); Hammond, LA
02/27/2016; 4:00 pm	Central Arkansas	W 75–56	9–19 (7–8)	University Center (831); Hammond, LA
02/29/2016; 7:00 pm	Northwestern State	W 84–82	10–19 (8–8)	University Center (1,050); Hammond, LA
03/03/2016; 7:45 pm	at New Orleans	W 61–60	11–19 (9–8)	Lakefront Arena (684); New Orleans, LA
03/05/2016; 3:30 pm	Nicholls State	L 45–64	11–20 (9–9)	Stopher Gym (901); Thibodaux, LA
Southland tournament
03/09/2016; 5:00 pm, ESPN3	vs. New Orleans; First round	L 74–84	12–20	Merrell Center (1,077); Katy, TX
03/10/2016; 5:00 pm, ESPN3	vs. Houston Baptist; Quarterfinals	L 68–72	12–21	Merrell Center (1,298); Katy, TX
*Non-conference game. ^{#}Rankings from AP Poll. (#) Tournament seedings in parentheses. All times are in Central Time.

== See also ==
- 2015–16 Southeastern Louisiana Lady Lions basketball team
