= 2015–16 Incarnate Word Cardinals men's basketball team =

American college basketball season

2015–16 Incarnate Word Cardinals men's basketball
- Conference: Southland Conference
- Record: 17–12 (12–6 Southland)
- Head coach: Ken Burmeister (10th season)
- Assistant coaches: Brian Curtis; John Smith; Johnny Brown
- Home arena: McDermott Convocation Center (Capacity: 2,000)

2015–16 Southland Conference men's basketball standings
	Conf.				Overall
Team	W		L	PCT	W		L	PCT
Stephen F. Austin †	18	–	0	1.000	28	–	6	.824
Texas A&M–CC	15	–	3	.833	25	–	8	.758
Sam Houston State	12	–	6	.667	18	–	16	.529
Incarnate Word*	12	–	6	.667	17	–	12	.586
Houston Baptist	10	–	8	.556	17	–	17	.500
Southeastern Louisiana	9	–	9	.500	12	–	21	.364
Abilene Christian*	8	–	10	.444	13	–	18	.419
McNeese State	7	–	11	.389	9	–	20	.310
Central Arkansas**	6	–	12	.333	7	–	21	.250
New Orleans	6	–	12	.333	10	–	20	.333
Nicholls State	6	–	12	.333	11	–	23	.324
Northwestern State	5	–	13	.278	8	–	20	.286
Lamar	3	–	15	.167	11	–	19	.367
† 2016 Southland tournament winner * Ineligible for postseason during transition to Division I ** Ineligible for postseason due to APR violations

The 2015–16 Incarnate Word Cardinals men's basketball team represented the University of the Incarnate Word during the 2015–16 NCAA Division I men's basketball season. The Cardinals were led by tenth year head coach Ken Burmeister and played their home games at McDermott Convocation Center. They were members of the Southland Conference. The Cardinals finished the season with a record of 17–12, 12–6 in conference play to finish in a tie for third place.

This was year three of a four-year transitional period for Incarnate Word from Division II to Division I. During year three, the Cardinals played a normal conference schedule. They were Division I for scheduling purposes and were also considered as a Division I RPI member. Although Incarnate Word was classified as a Division I school for scheduling purposes in years two through four and can win the regular season conference title, they cannot participate in the conference tournament until the 2017–18 season at which time they will also be able to enter the NCAA Tournament, should they win the conference.

== Preseason ==
The Cardinals were picked to finish sixth (6th) in both the Southland Conference Coaches' Poll and fifth (5th) in the Sports Information Directors Poll.

== Audio streaming ==
All Incarnate Word games were broadcast on KKYX. KKYX's broadcasts were available at their website. KUIW Radio also produced a student media broadcast for each non-televised home game, that was to be available online, and they were to provide streaming of all non-televised home games to be shown via UIW TV.

== Roster ==
2015–16 Incarnate Word Cardinals men's basketball team
Players
Coaches

Pos.	#	Name	Height	Weight	Year	Previous school	Hometown
PG	0	Jontrell Walker	6 ft 1 in (1.85 m)	188 lb (85 kg)	So	Aurora West	Aurora, IL
F	1	Derail Green	6 ft 7 in (2.01 m)	215 lb (98 kg)	Jr	Klein Forest; Wichita State University	Houston, TX
PG	2	Mitchell Badillo	5 ft 9 in (1.75 m)	170 lb (77 kg)	Sr	Cy Falls	Houston, TX
F	3	Simi Socks	6 ft 6 in (1.98 m)	210 lb (95 kg)	Fr	Coppell; Bridgton Academy	Coppell, TX
F	4	Kyle Hittle	6 ft 5 in (1.96 m)	210 lb (95 kg)	Sr	New Braunfels	New Braunfels, TX
PF	5	Tavin Askew	6 ft 8 in (2.03 m)	215 lb (98 kg)	Jr	Woodale; Shelton CC	Memphis, TN
PG	10	Tyler Singleton	6 ft 3 in (1.91 m)	175 lb (79 kg)	Fr	Triple A Academy	Dallas, TX
G	15	Sam Burmeister	6 ft 5 in (1.96 m)	200 lb (91 kg)	So	Churchill	San Antonio, TX
SG	23	Jorden Kite	6 ft 5 in (1.96 m)	180 lb (82 kg)	Fr	Clark	San Antonio, TX
G	24	Phillip Johnson	6 ft 5 in (1.96 m)	200 lb (91 kg)	Jr	Edison High School (New Orleans)	New Orleans, LA
F	32	Jerred Kite	6 ft 11 in (2.11 m)	215 lb (98 kg)	Jr	Antonian High School; Texas A&M-Corpus Christi	San Antonio, TX
G	41	Shawn Johnson	6 ft 4 in (1.93 m)	195 lb (88 kg)	So	Alief Hastings	New Orleans, LA

Head coach

- Ken Burmeister (Saint Mary's)

Assistant coach(es)

- Brian Curtis (Incarnate Word)
- John Smith (Northwestern State)
- Johnny Brown (New Mexico)

Legend

- (C) Team captain
- (S) Suspended
- (I) Ineligible
- (W) Walk-on
- Injured
- Current redshirt

Roster
Last update: 2015-11-20

== Schedule and results ==
Date time, TV	Opponent	Result	Record	Site (attendance) city, state
Non-Conference regular season
11/13/2015*; 8:30 pm	Texas Lutheran	W 86–65	1–0	McDermott Center (2,108); San Antonio, TX
11/16/2015*; 8:30 pm	Schreiner	W 79–43	2–0	McDermott Center (502); San Antonio, TX
11/18/2015*; 6:00 pm	at No. 21 Purdue	L 61–96	2–1	Mackey Arena (11,536); West Lafayette, IN
11/24/2015*; 7:00 pm	at No. 7 Oklahoma	L 63–96	2–2	Lloyd Noble Center (7,332); Norman, OK
12/03/2015*; 8:30 pm	Dallas Christian	W 108–71	3–2	McDermott Center (602); San Antonio, TX
12/07/2015*; 7:05 pm	at Sacramento State	L 70–73	3–3	Hornets Nest (803); Sacramento, CA
12/09/2015*; 10:00 pm	at California	L 62–74	3–4	Haas Pavilion (9,324); Berkeley, CA
12/15/2015*; 7:00 pm	Our Lady of the Lake	L 97–99	3–5	McDermott Center (502); San Antonio, TX
12/18/2015*; 6:00 pm	at St. John's	W 73–51	4–5	Carnesecca Arena (4,120); Queens, NY
12/22/2015*; 7:00 pm	vs. LIU Brooklyn	L 59–66	4–6	Barclays Center (791); Brooklyn, NY
12/29/2015*; 7:00 pm	at Rice	W 82–76	5–6	Tudor Fieldhouse (1,747); Houston, TX
Southland regular season
01/02/2016; 4:30 pm	Sam Houston State	L 72–78	5–7 (0–1)	McDermott Center (809); San Antonio, TX
01/09/2016; 4:30 pm	Northwestern State	W 70–56	6–7 (1–1)	McDermott Center (554); San Antonio, TX
01/11/2016; 7:00 pm	at New Orleans	W 71–68	7–7 (2–1)	Lakefront Arena (481); New Orleans, LA
01/16/2016; 4:00 pm	at Southeastern Louisiana	W 75–71	8–7 (3–1)	University Center (644); Hammond, LA
01/23/2016; 4:30 pm	Abilene Christian	W 74–60	9–7 (4–1)	McDermott Center (1,722); San Antonio, TX
01/25/2016; 7:00 pm	at McNeese State	L 76–79	9–8 (4–2)	Burton Coliseum (401); Lake Charles, LA
01/30/2016; 4:30 pm	Nicholls State	W 68–61	10–8 (5–2)	McDermott Center (408); San Antonio, TX
02/02/2016; 7:00 pm, TWCS	Texas A&M–Corpus Christi	W 70–65	11–8 (6–2)	McDermott Center (1,230); San Antonio, TX
02/06/2016; 7:30 pm, ESPN3	at Lamar	W 74–71	12–8 (7–2)	Montagne Center (2,128); Beaumont, TX
02/08/2016; 6:30 pm	at Nicholls State	L 60–71	12–9 (7–3)	Stopher Gym (561); Thibodaux, LA
02/12/2016; 7:00 pm	Central Arkansas	W 71–69	13–9 (8–3)	McDermott Center (827); San Antonio, TX
02/15/2016; 7:00 pm, ESPN3	at Stephen F. Austin	L 46–84	13–10 (8–4)	William R. Johnson Coliseum (2,892); Nacogdoches, TX
02/20/2016; 7:00 pm	at Texas A&M–Corpus Christi	L 69–90	13–11 (8–5)	Dugan Wellness Center (1,422); Corpus Christi, TX
02/22/2016; 7:00 pm	at Houston Baptist	W 97–91	14–11 (9–5)	Sharp Gymnasium (818); Houston, TX
02/27/2016; 4:30 pm, TWCS	Lamar	W 89–70	15–11 (10–5)	McDermott Center (824); San Antonio, TX
02/29/2016; 6:00 pm	Stephen F. Austin	L 58–84	15–12 (10–6)	McDermott Center (876); San Antonio, TX
03/03/2016; 7:00 pm	at Abilene Christian	W 74–70	16–12 (11–6)	Moody Coliseum (1,633); Abilene, TX
03/05/2016; 4:00 pm	Houston Baptist	W 97–86	17–12 (12–6)	McDermott Center; San Antonio, TX
*Non-conference game. ^{#}Rankings from AP Poll. (#) Tournament seedings in parentheses. All times are in Central Time.

== See also ==
- 2015–16 Incarnate Word Cardinals women's basketball team
