= 2015–16 Northwestern State Demons basketball team =

American college basketball season

2015–16 Northwestern State Demons basketball
- Conference: Southland Conference
- Record: 8–20 (5–13 Southland)
- Head coach: Mike McConathy (17th season)
- Assistant coaches: Jeff Moore; Bill Lewit; Jacob Spielbauer
- Home arena: Prather Coliseum (Capacity: 3,900)

2015–16 Southland Conference men's basketball standings
	Conf.				Overall
Team	W		L	PCT	W		L	PCT
Stephen F. Austin †	18	–	0	1.000	28	–	6	.824
Texas A&M–CC	15	–	3	.833	25	–	8	.758
Sam Houston State	12	–	6	.667	18	–	16	.529
Incarnate Word*	12	–	6	.667	17	–	12	.586
Houston Baptist	10	–	8	.556	17	–	17	.500
Southeastern Louisiana	9	–	9	.500	12	–	21	.364
Abilene Christian*	8	–	10	.444	13	–	18	.419
McNeese State	7	–	11	.389	9	–	20	.310
Central Arkansas**	6	–	12	.333	7	–	21	.250
New Orleans	6	–	12	.333	10	–	20	.333
Nicholls State	6	–	12	.333	11	–	23	.324
Northwestern State	5	–	13	.278	8	–	20	.286
Lamar	3	–	15	.167	11	–	19	.367
† 2016 Southland tournament winner * Ineligible for postseason during transition to Division I ** Ineligible for postseason due to APR violations

The 2015–16 Northwestern State Demons basketball team represented Northwestern State University during the 2015–16 NCAA Division I men's basketball season. The Demons, led by 17th-year head coach Mike McConathy, played their home games at Prather Coliseum in Natchitoches, Louisiana and were members of the Southland Conference. They finished the season with a record of 8–20, 5–13, to finish 12th place in conference. As a result, they failed to qualify for the Southland tournament.

== Previous season ==
The Demons were picked to finish second (2nd) in both the Southland Conference Coaches' Poll and the Sports Information Directors Poll receiving one first-place vote in the coaches' poll and three first-place votes in the SID poll. They finished the season 19–13, 13–5 in Southland play, to finish in a tie for third place. They advanced to the semifinals of the Southland tournament where they lost to Stephen F. Austin. They were invited to the CollegeInsdier.com Tournament where they lost in the first round to UT Martin.

== Roster ==
2015–16 Northwestern State Demons men's basketball team
Players
Coaches

Pos.	#	Name	Height	Weight	Year	Previous school	Hometown
G	0	Tra'von Joseph	6 ft 5 in (1.96 m)	185 lb (84 kg)	Jr	North Central HS	Morrow, LA
F	1	Levi Yancy	6 ft 8 in (2.03 m)	185 lb (84 kg)	Jr	White Oak HS; Tyler JC	White Oak, TX
G	2	Ta'Jon Welcome	6 ft 4 in (1.93 m)	165 lb (75 kg)	Sr	Booker T. Washington HS; Tyler JC	Houston, TX
G	3	Devonte Hall	6 ft 1 in (1.85 m)	180 lb (82 kg)	So	Bossier HS	Bossier City, LA
G/F	10	Reginald Kissoonial	6 ft 11 in (2.11 m)	195 lb (88 kg)	RS Fr	William M. Raines HS	Jacksonville, FL
G	12	Jalan West	5 ft 11 in (1.8 m)	185 lb (84 kg)	Sr	Bossier HS	Bossier City, LA
F	13	Matt Killian	6 ft 5 in (1.96 m)	180 lb (82 kg)	Sr	Hornbeck HS	Hornbeck, LA
G	15	Malik Metoyer	6 ft 7 in (2.01 m)	190 lb (86 kg)	Fr	Lakeview HS	Clarence, LA
F/C	20	Ishmael Lane	6 ft 8 in (2.03 m)	250 lb (113 kg)	Fr	Port Allen HS	Port Allen, LA
G	21	Sabri Thompson	6 ft 3 in (1.91 m)	195 lb (88 kg)	Jr	Sanford HS	Newark, DE
G	22	Cody Cambre	6 ft 4 in (1.93 m)	205 lb (93 kg)	Fr	French Settlement HS	French Settlement, LA
G	23	Zeek Woodley	6 ft 2 in (1.88 m)	209 lb (95 kg)	Jr	Pelican All-Saints HS	Pelican, LA
F/C	35	Colby Koontz	6 ft 9 in (2.06 m)	250 lb (113 kg)	Fr	Pioneer-Pleasant Vale HS	Enid, OK
G	40	Daniel Hazlewood	6 ft 2 in (1.88 m)	200 lb (91 kg)	Jr	Huntsville HS	Huntsville, TX
G	42	Will Poole	6 ft 0 in (1.83 m)	160 lb (73 kg)	Jr	C.E. Byrd HS	Shreveport, LA
G	44	Bailey Walker	6 ft 0 in (1.83 m)	180 lb (82 kg)	Fr	Florien HS	Florien, LA
G		Stan Mays	6 ft 2 in (1.88 m)	190 lb (86 kg)	Jr	Episcopal HS; Texas Tech	Baton Rouge, LA

Head coach

- Mike McConathy

Assistant coach(es)

- Jeff Moore
- Bill Lewit
- Jacob Spielbauer

Legend

- (C) Team captain
- (S) Suspended
- (I) Ineligible
- (W) Walk-on
- Injured
- Current redshirt

Roster
Last update: September 20, 2024

== Radio ==
Most games were carried live on the Demon Sports Radio Network. There were three affiliates for the Demon Sports Radio Network.

- KZBL (Flagship)
- KSYR
- KTEZ

== Schedule ==
Date time, TV	Opponent	Result	Record	Site (attendance) city, state
Non-conference regular season
November 13, 2015*; 4:00 p.m., SEC+	at Ole Miss	L 76–90	0–1	Tad Smith Coliseum (6,386); Oxford, MS
November 16, 2015*; 6:30 p.m.	LSU–Alexandria	L 97–99	0–2	Prather Coliseum (1,726); Natchitoches, LA
November 19, 2015*; 6:30 p.m.	Louisiana–Monroe	L 64–80	0–3	Prather Coliseum (1,917); Natchitoches, LA
November 22, 2015*; 7:00 p.m., P12N	at No. 12 Arizona	L 42–61	0–4	McKale Center (14,396); Tucson, AZ
November 25, 2015*; 6:30 p.m.	Louisiana College	W 86–80	1–4	Prather Coliseum (1,220); Natchitoches, LA
November 27, 2015*; 7:30 p.m., SEC+	at Auburn	L 81–119	1–5	Auburn Arena (8,529); Auburn, AL
December 1, 2015*; 7:00 p.m., SEC+	at Arkansas	L 78–117	1–6	Bud Walton Arena (13,984); Fayetteville, AR
December 8, 2015*; 7:00 p.m., FSSW+	at No. 16 Baylor	L 62–75	1–7	Ferrell Center (4,627); Waco, TX
December 19, 2015*; 2:00 p.m.	Missouri Valley	W 105–79	2–7	Prather Coliseum (1,244); Natchitoches, LA
December 29, 2015*; 6:00 p.m.	at Centenary	W 92–69	3–7	Gold Dome (1,377); Shreveport, LA
Southland Conference season
January 2, 2016; 3:00 p.m.	Houston Baptist	L 73–99	3–8 (0–1)	Prather Coliseum (1,218); Natchitoches, LA
January 4, 2016; 7:00 p.m.	Sam Houston State	L 79–94	3–9 (0–2)	Prather Coliseum (1,223); Natchitoches, LA
January 9, 2016; 4:30 p.m.	at Incarnate Word	L 56–70	3–10 (0–3)	McDermott Center (554); San Antonio, TX
January 12, 2016; 7:00 p.m.	at Abilene Christian	L 72–87	3–11 (0–4)	Moody Coliseum (1,512); Abilene, TX
January 16, 2016; 4:30 p.m., ESPN3	at Lamar	L 82–86	3–12 (0–5)	Montagne Center (1,825); Beaumont, TX
January 19, 2016; 6:30 p.m.	Texas A&M–Corpus Christi	L 79–89	3–13 (0–6)	Prather Coliseum (1,620); Natchitoches, LA
January 23, 2016; 3:00 p.m.	at McNeese State	L 74–75	3–14 (0–7)	Burton Coliseum (1,231); Lake Charles, LA
January 25, 2016; 6:30 p.m.	at Nicholls State	W 88–80	4–14 (1–7)	Stopher Gym (2,147); Thibodaux, LA
January 30, 2016; 3:00 p.m.	Southeastern Louisiana	W 91–76	5–14 (2–7)	Prather Coliseum (1,920); Natchitoches, LA
February 2, 2016; 6:30 p.m.	Central Arkansas	W 91–75	6–14 (3–7)	Prather Coliseum (1,423); Natchitoches, LA
February 8, 2016; 7:00 p.m., ESPN3	at Stephen F. Austin	L 72–83	6–15 (3–8)	William R. Johnson Coliseum; Nacogdoches, TX
February 13, 2016; 3:30 p.m.	McNeese State	W 87–78	7–15 (4–8)	Prather Coliseum (1,837); Natchitoches, LA
February 15, 2016; 7:00 p.m.	at Central Arkansas	L 94–107	7–16 (4–9)	Farris Center (715); Conway, AR
February 20, 2016; 3:00 p.m.	New Orleans	L 99–102	7–17 (4–10)	Prather Coliseum (1,928); Natchitoches, LA
February 22, 2016; 6:30 p.m.	Nicholls State	W 81–67	8–17 (5–10)	Prather Coliseum (1,923); Natchitoches, LA
February 29, 2016; 7:00 p.m.	at Southeastern Louisiana	L 82–84	8–18 (5–11)	University Center (1,050); Hammond, LA
March 3, 2016; 7:00 p.m.	Stephen F. Austin	L 55–95	8–19 (5–12)	Prather Coliseum (3,020); Natchitoches, LA
March 5, 2016; 6:15 p.m.	at New Orleans	L 86–97	8–20 (5–13)	Lakefront Arena (866); New Orleans, LA
*Non-conference game. ^{#}Rankings from AP poll. (#) Tournament seedings in parentheses. All times are in Central.

== See also ==
- 2015–16 Northwestern State Lady Demons basketball team
