= 2017–18 New Orleans Privateers men's basketball team =

American college basketball season

2017–18 New Orleans Privateers men's basketball

CBI, Quarterfinals
- Conference: Southland Conference
- Record: 16–17 (11–7 Southland)
- Head coach: Mark Slessinger (7th season)
- Assistant coaches: Jody Bailey; Kris Arkenberg; Bill Duany
- Home arena: Lakefront Arena

2017–18 Southland Conference men's basketball standings
	Conf.				Overall
Team	W		L	PCT	W		L	PCT
Southeastern Louisiana	15	–	3	.833	22	–	12	.647
Nicholls State	15	–	3	.833	21	–	11	.656
Stephen F. Austin †	14	–	4	.778	28	–	7	.800
Sam Houston State	12	–	6	.667	21	–	15	.583
Lamar	11	–	7	.611	19	–	14	.576
New Orleans	11	–	7	.611	16	–	17	.485
Central Arkansas	10	–	8	.556	18	–	17	.514
Abilene Christian	8	–	10	.444	16	–	16	.500
Texas A&M–CC	8	–	10	.444	11	–	18	.379
McNeese State	8	–	10	.444	11	–	17	.393
Incarnate Word	2	–	16	.111	7	–	21	.250
Houston Baptist	2	–	16	.111	6	–	25	.194
Northwestern State	1	–	17	.056	4	–	25	.138
† 2018 Southland tournament winner

The 2017–18 New Orleans Privateers men's basketball team represented the University of New Orleans during the 2017–18 NCAA Division I men's basketball season. The Privateers were led by seventh-year head coach Mark Slessinger and played their home games at Lakefront Arena as members of the Southland Conference. They finished the season 16–17, 11–7 in Southland play to finish in a tie for fifth place. As the No. 5 seed in the Southland tournament, they defeated Texas A&M–Corpus Christi in the first round before losing to Sam Houston State in the quarterfinals. They received an invitation to the College Basketball Invitational where they defeated Texas–Rio Grande Valley in the first round and received a second round bye before losing in the quarterfinals to Campbell.

== Previous season ==
The Privateers finished the 2016–17 season 20–12, 13–5 in Southland play to win the regular season Southland championship. They defeated Sam Houston State and Texas A&M–Corpus Christi to win the Southland Conference tournament. As a result, they earned the conference's automatic bid to the NCAA tournament where they lost in the First Four to Mount St. Mary's.

== Roster ==
2017–18 New Orleans Privateers men's basketball team
Players
Coaches

Pos.	#	Name	Height	Weight	Year	Hometown
G	0	Diontae Champion	6 ft 5 in (1.96 m)	180 lb (82 kg)	Jr	Pearl, Mississippi
G	1	Damion Rosser	6 ft 4 in (1.93 m)	205 lb (93 kg)	Fr	McDonough, Georgia
G	2	Lamont Berzat	5 ft 6 in (1.68 m)	155 lb (70 kg)	Fr	New Orleans, Louisiana
G	3	Troy Green	6 ft 3 in (1.91 m)	210 lb (95 kg)	Fr	St. Rose, Louisiana
G	4	Bryson Robinson	6 ft 4 in (1.93 m)	195 lb (88 kg)	So	Mesquite, Texas
G	5	Charles Bohannon	6 ft 90 in (4.11 m)	195 lb (88 kg)	Fr	Austin, Texas
G/F	11	Michael Zeno	6 ft 6 in (1.98 m)	230 lb (104 kg)	Sr	Beaumont, Texas
G	13	Jorge Rosa	6 ft 4 in (1.93 m)	203 lb (92 kg)	Sr	Orlando, Florida
G	15	Tyren Harrison	6 ft 5 in (1.96 m)	185 lb (84 kg)	Jr	Queens, New York
C	21	Bol Riek	7 ft 3 in (2.21 m)	222 lb (101 kg)	Fr	Bentiu, South Sudan
F	22	Makur Puou	6 ft 9 in (2.06 m)	210 lb (95 kg)	Sr	Rumbek, South Sudan
F	25	Travin Thibodeaux	6 ft 8 in (2.03 m)	235 lb (107 kg)	Sr	Plaquemine, Louisiana
G	32	Matthew Jiles	5 ft 10 in (1.78 m)	155 lb (70 kg)	Sr	Braithwaite, Louisiana
G	33	Ezekiel Charles	6 ft 4 in (1.93 m)	205 lb (93 kg)	Jr	Brooklyn, New York
F	55	Scott Plaisance	6 ft 9 in (2.06 m)	220 lb (100 kg)	RS Jr	Marrero, Louisiana

Head coach

- Mark Slessinger (Aurora)

Assistant coach(es)

- Jody Bailey (Louisville)
- Kris Arkenberg (Franklin (IN))
- Bill Duany (Indiana)

Legend

- (C) Team captain
- (S) Suspended
- (I) Ineligible
- (W) Walk-on
- Injured
- Current redshirt

Roster
Last update: 2018-02-08

== Schedule and results ==
Date time, TV	Rank^{#}	Opponent^{#}	Result	Record	Site (attendance) city, state
Exhibition
Oct 25, 2017*; 7:00 pm		Huntingdon	W 94–71		Lakefront Arena (652); New Orleans, LA
Non-conference regular season
Nov 10, 2017*; 6:00 pm, FCS		at St. John's	L 61–77	0–1	Carnesecca Arena (4,921); Queens, NY
Nov 13, 2017*; 6:00 pm, ESPN3		at Oakland	L 68–87	0–2	Athletics Center O'rena (2,944); Rochester, MI
Nov 21, 2017*; 7:00 pm, ESPN3		at Memphis	L 52–63	0–3	FedEx Forum (7,224); Memphis, TN
Nov 24, 2017*; 2:00 pm		Spring Hill	W 74–67	1–3	Lakefront Arena (532); New Orleans, LA
Nov 26, 2017*; 3:05 pm		at South Alabama	L 52–55	1–4	Mitchell Center (1,548); Mobile, AL
Nov 29, 2017*; 7:00 pm		at Houston	L 66–75	1–5	H&PE Arena (2,586); Houston, TX
Dec 2, 2017*; 2:00 pm		Williams Baptist	W 87–70	2–5	Lakefront Arena (302); New Orleans, LA
Dec 13, 2017*; 8:00 pm, ESPN3		at SMU	L 66–79	2–6	Moody Coliseum (6,512); Dallas, TX
Dec 16, 2017*; 7:00 pm		at Louisiana	L 65–87	2–7	Cajundome (3,445); Lafayette, LA
Dec 18, 2017*; 7:00 pm		Oklahoma Panhandle State	W 107–59	3–7	Lakefront Arena (418); New Orleans, LA
Dec 20, 2017*; 7:00 pm		at UAB	L 67–74	3–8	Bartow Arena (3,229); Birmingham, AL
Southland regular season
Dec 28, 2018; 7:00 pm		Abilene Christian	W 77–74	4–8 (1–0)	Lakefront Arena (528); New Orleans, LA
Dec 30, 2018; 7:00 pm		at Houston Baptist	W 64–57	5–8 (2–0)	Sharp Gym (602); Houston, TX
Jan 3, 2018; 7:00 pm		Lamar	W 72–62	6–8 (3–0)	Lakefront Arena (513); New Orleans, LA
Jan 6, 2018; 3:30 pm		at McNeese State	W 82–75 ^{OT}	7–8 (4–0)	Burton Coliseum (913); Lake Charles, LA
Jan 10, 2018; 7:00 pm		at Stephen F. Austin	L 68–78	7–9 (4–1)	William R. Johnson Coliseum (4,173); Nacogdoches, TX
Jan 13, 2018; 4:15 pm		Texas A&M–Corpus Christi	W 61–55	8–9 (5–1)	Lakefront Arena (731); New Orleans, LA
Jan 17, 2018; 7:00 pm		Central Arkansas	L 57–81	8–10 (5–2)	Lakefront Arena (471); New Orleans, LA
Jan 20, 2018; 4:15 pm		Incarnate Word	W 74–70	9–10 (6–2)	Lakefront Arena (1,407); New Orleans, LA
Jan 24, 2018; 6:30 pm		at Northwestern State	W 73–67	10–10 (7–2)	Prather Coliseum (1,522); Natchitoches, LA
Jan 27, 2018; 3:00 pm		at Incarnate Word	W 68–58	11–10 (8–2)	McDermott Convocation Center (1,394); San Antonio, TX
Jan 31, 2018; 7:00 pm		Northwestern State	W 82–64	12–10 (9–2)	Lakefront Arena (731); New Orleans, LA
Feb 3, 2018; 4:15 pm		Nicholls State	L 64–81	12–11 (9–3)	Lakefront Arena (2,103); New Orleans, LA
Feb 10, 2018; 7:00 pm		at Texas A&M–Corpus Christi	W 62–53	13–11 (10–3)	American Bank Center (3,317); Corpus Christi, TX
Feb 14, 2018; 7:00 pm		at Southeastern Louisiana	L 64–71	13–12 (10–4)	University Center (816); Hammond, LA
Feb 17, 2018; 4:15 pm		McNeese State	W 90–74	14–12 (11–4)	Lakefront Arena (1,571); New Orleans, LA
Feb 21, 2018; 6:30 pm		at Sam Houston State	L 54–57	14–13 (11–5)	Bernard G. Johnson Coliseum (1,043); Huntsville, TX
Feb 24, 2018; 6:00 pm		at Nicholls State	L 64–78	14–14 (11–6)	Stopher Gymnasium (1,007); Thibodaux, LA
Feb 28, 2018; 7:00 pm		Southeastern Louisiana	L 64–68	14–15 (11–7)	Lakefront Arena (1,182); New Orleans, LA
Southland tournament
Mar 7, 2018; 5:00 pm, ESPN3	(5)	vs. (8) Texas A&M–Corpus Christi; First round	W 83–76	15–15	Merrell Center (970); Katy, TX
Mar 8, 2018; 5:00 pm, ESPN3	(5)	vs. (4) Sam Houston State; Quarterfinals	L 63–85	15–16	Merrell Center (1,839); Katy, TX
CBI
Mar 14, 2018*; 7:00 pm		Texas–Rio Grande Valley; First round	W 77–74	16–16	Lakefront Arena (741); New Orleans, LA
Mar 19, 2018*; 6:00 pm		at Campbell; Quarterfinals	L 69–71	16–17	Gore Arena (1,316); Buies Creek, NC
*Non-conference game. ^{#}Rankings from AP Poll. (#) Tournament seedings in parentheses. All times are in Central Time.

== See also ==
- 2017–18 New Orleans Privateers women's basketball team
