= 2017–18 McNeese State Cowboys basketball team =

American college basketball season

2017–18 McNeese State Cowboys basketball
- Conference: Southland Conference
- Record: 11–17 (8–10 Southland)
- Head coach: Dave Simmons (12th season)
- Assistant coaches: David Dumars; Preston David; Eric Wills
- Home arena: Burton Coliseum

2017–18 Southland Conference men's basketball standings
	Conf.				Overall
Team	W		L	PCT	W		L	PCT
Southeastern Louisiana	15	–	3	.833	22	–	12	.647
Nicholls State	15	–	3	.833	21	–	11	.656
Stephen F. Austin †	14	–	4	.778	28	–	7	.800
Sam Houston State	12	–	6	.667	21	–	15	.583
Lamar	11	–	7	.611	19	–	14	.576
New Orleans	11	–	7	.611	16	–	17	.485
Central Arkansas	10	–	8	.556	18	–	17	.514
Abilene Christian	8	–	10	.444	16	–	16	.500
Texas A&M–CC	8	–	10	.444	11	–	18	.379
McNeese State	8	–	10	.444	11	–	17	.393
Incarnate Word	2	–	16	.111	7	–	21	.250
Houston Baptist	2	–	16	.111	6	–	25	.194
Northwestern State	1	–	17	.056	4	–	25	.138
† 2018 Southland tournament winner

The 2017–18 McNeese State Cowboys basketball team represented McNeese State University during the 2017–18 NCAA Division I men's basketball season. The Cowboys were led by 12th-year head coach Dave Simmons and played their home games at Burton Coliseum in Lake Charles, Louisiana as members of the Southland Conference. The Cowboys finished the season 11–17, 8–10 in Southland play to finish in a three-way tie for eighth place. They failed to qualify for the Southland tournament.

On March 5, 2018, the school announced that Dave Simmons would not return as head coach after 12 seasons at McNeese State. On March 15, the school hired BYU assistant Heath Schroyer as head coach.

== Previous season ==
The Cowboys finished the 2016–17 season 7–22, 4–14 in Southland play to finish in last place. They failed to qualify for the Southland tournament.

== Roster ==
2017–18 McNeese State Cowboys men's basketball team
Players
Coaches

Pos.	#	Name	Height	Weight	Year	Hometown
F	0	Quatarrius Wilson	6 ft 8 in (2.03 m)	200 lb (91 kg)	Jr	Mobile, Alabama
G	1	Kalob Ledoux	6 ft 3 in (1.91 m)	215 lb (98 kg)	So	Port Barre, Louisiana
G	2	James Harvey	6 ft 2 in (1.88 m)	172 lb (78 kg)	Jr	Amite, Louisiana
F	3	Richard Laku	6 ft 8 in (2.03 m)	190 lb (86 kg)	RS So	Dallas, Texas
F	5	Fred Haywood	6 ft 5 in (1.96 m)	186 lb (84 kg)	RS Fr	Mound Bayou, Mississippi
G	10	Jarren Greenwood	6 ft 2 in (1.88 m)	172 lb (78 kg)	Jr	Houston, Texas
G	11	Myles Hutchinson	6 ft 0 in (1.83 m)	170 lb (77 kg)	Fr	Abbeville, Louisiana
G	12	Jacob Ledoux	6 ft 3 in (1.91 m)	177 lb (80 kg)	So	Port Barre, Louisiana
F	13	Jacob Bonnington	6 ft 11 in (2.11 m)	228 lb (103 kg)	RS Fr	Sugar Land, Texas
F	15	LaBarrius Hill	6 ft 8 in (2.03 m)	199 lb (90 kg)	Sr	Parrish, Alabama
G	20	Kelvin Henry, Jr.	6 ft 0 in (1.83 m)	190 lb (86 kg)	RS Fr	Lake Charles, Louisiana
F	30	Adrian Brown	6 ft 7 in (2.01 m)	211 lb (96 kg)	Jr	Houston, Texas
G	31	Stephen Ugochukwu	6 ft 7 in (2.01 m)	220 lb (100 kg)	Sr	Lewisville, Texas
C	33	Demarco Owens	6 ft 8 in (2.03 m)	260 lb (118 kg)	Jr	St. Louis, Missouri

Head coach

- Dave Simmons

Assistant coach(es)

- David Dumars
- Preston David
- Eric Willis

Legend

- (C) Team captain
- (S) Suspended
- (I) Ineligible
- (W) Walk-on
- Injured
- Current redshirt

Roster
Last update: 2018-02-08

== Schedule and results ==
Date time, TV	Opponent	Result	Record	Site (attendance) city, state
Non-conference regular season
Nov 10, 2017*; 7:00 pm, ESPN3	at Houston	L 53–81	0–1	H&PE Arena (3,241); Houston, TX
Nov 13, 2017*; 7:00 pm	Ecclesia	W 101–54	1–1	Burton Coliseum (732); Lake Charles, LA
Nov 17, 2017*; 9:30 pm	at San Diego State	L 52–83	1–2	Viejas Arena (10,702); San Diego, CA
Nov 19, 2017*; 5:00 pm	at Loyola Marymount	W 86–82 ^{OT}	1–3	Gersten Pavilion (718); Los Angeles, CA
Nov 25, 2017*; 3:00 pm	Southern-New Orleans	W 103–79	2–3	Burton Coliseum (783); Lake Charles, LA
Nov 28, 2017*; 7:00 pm	at Louisiana	L 78–89	2–4	Cajundome (3,489); Lafayette, LA
Dec 9, 2017*; 5:00 pm	at North Texas	L 47–85	2–5	The Super Pit (1,612); Denton, TX
Dec 14, 2017*; 6:00 pm	at North Carolina Central	L 71–77	2–6	McDougald–McLendon Gymnasium (377); Durham, NC
Dec 16, 2017*; 1:00 pm, ACC Extra	at Pittsburgh	L 51–72	2–7	Petersen Events Center (2,830); Pittsburgh, PA
Dec 19, 2017*; 7:00 pm	Texas College	W 84–68	3–7	Burton Coliseum (729); Lake Charles, LA
Southland regular season
Dec 28, 2017; 6:30 pm	Incarnate Word	W 85–62	4–7 (1–0)	Burton Coliseum (743); Lake Charles, LA
Dec 30, 2017; 3:30 pm	Northwestern State	W 72–63	5–7 (2–0)	Burton Coliseum (997); Lake Charles, LA
Jan 3, 2018; 7:00 pm	at Abilene Christian	L 74–79	5–8 (2–1)	Moody Coliseum (1,183); Abilene, TX
Jan 6, 2018; 3:30 pm	New Orleans	L 75–85 ^{OT}	5–9 (2–2)	Burton Coliseum (913); Lake Charles, LA
Jan 10, 2018; 7:00 pm	at Nicholls State	L 80–85	5–10 (2–3)	Stopher Gymnasium (266); Thibodaux, LA
Jan 13, 2018; 5:00 pm	at Southeastern Louisiana	W 71–62	6–10 (3–3)	University Center (744); Hammond, LA
Jan 20, 2018; 7:00 pm	at Houston Baptist	W 86–81	7–10 (4–3)	Sharp Gymnasium (962); Houston, TX
Jan 27, 2018; 4:30 pm, ESPN3	at Lamar	L 80–86	7–11 (4–4)	Montagne Center (2,196); Beaumont, TX
Jan 30, 2018; 6:30 pm	Sam Houston State	W 67–57	7–12 (4–5)	Burton Coliseum (902); Lake Charles, LA
Feb 3, 2018; 3:30 pm	at Northwestern State	W 75–62	8–12 (5–5)	Prather Coliseum (1,315); Natchitoches, LA
Feb 8, 2018; 6:30 pm, ELVN	Stephen F. Austin	L 95–99	8–13 (5–6)	Burton Coliseum (647); Lake Charles, LA
Feb 10, 2018; 3:30 pm	Southeastern Louisiana	L 67–74	8–14 (5–7)	Burton Coliseum (617); Lake Charles, LA
Feb 14, 2018; 7:00 pm	at Central Arkansas	W 76–72	9–14 (6–7)	Farris Center (873); Conway, AR
Feb 17, 2018; 4:15 pm	at New Orleans	L 74–90	9–15 (6–8)	Lakefront Arena (1,571); New Orleans, LA
Feb 21, 2018; 6:30 pm	Nicholls State	L 79–96	9–16 (6–9)	Burton Coliseum (807); Lake Charles, LA
Feb 24, 2018; 3:30 pm	Houston Baptist	W 88–79	10–16 (7–9)	Burton Coliseum (717); Lake Charles, LA
Feb 28, 2018; 7:00 pm	at Texas A&M–Corpus Christi	L 70–82	10–17 (7–10)	American Bank Center (1,235); Corpus Christi, TX
Mar 3, 2018; 3:30 pm	Lamar	W 69–60	11–17 (8–10)	Burton Coliseum (940); Lake Charles, LA
*Non-conference game. ^{#}Rankings from AP Poll. (#) Tournament seedings in parentheses. All times are in Central Time.

== See also ==
- 2017–18 McNeese State Cowgirls basketball team
