= 2017–18 Incarnate Word Cardinals men's basketball team =

American college basketball season

2017–18 Incarnate Word Cardinals men's basketball
- Conference: Southland Conference
- Record: 7–21 (2–16 Southland)
- Head coach: Ken Burmeister (12th season)
- Assistant coaches: Brian Curtis; John Smith; Kenyon Spears
- Home arena: McDermott Convocation Center

2017–18 Southland Conference men's basketball standings
	Conf.				Overall
Team	W		L	PCT	W		L	PCT
Southeastern Louisiana	15	–	3	.833	22	–	12	.647
Nicholls State	15	–	3	.833	21	–	11	.656
Stephen F. Austin †	14	–	4	.778	28	–	7	.800
Sam Houston State	12	–	6	.667	21	–	15	.583
Lamar	11	–	7	.611	19	–	14	.576
New Orleans	11	–	7	.611	16	–	17	.485
Central Arkansas	10	–	8	.556	18	–	17	.514
Abilene Christian	8	–	10	.444	16	–	16	.500
Texas A&M–CC	8	–	10	.444	11	–	18	.379
McNeese State	8	–	10	.444	11	–	17	.393
Incarnate Word	2	–	16	.111	7	–	21	.250
Houston Baptist	2	–	16	.111	6	–	25	.194
Northwestern State	1	–	17	.056	4	–	25	.138
† 2018 Southland tournament winner

The 2017–18 Incarnate Word Cardinals men's basketball team represented the University of the Incarnate Word during the 2017–18 NCAA Division I men's basketball season. The Cardinals were led by 12th-year head coach Ken Burmeister and played their home games at McDermott Convocation Center in San Antonio, Texas as members of the Southland Conference. The Cardinals finished the season 7–21, 2–16 in Southland play to finish in a tie for 11th place. They failed to qualify for the Southland tournament.

The season marked the Cardinals' first full season as a Division I school after a four-year transition period from Division II to Division I and were thus eligible for postseason play.

On March 6, 2018, the school announced that head coach Ken Burmeister would not return as head coach. The Cardinals hired Carson Cunningham from Carroll College of the NAIA as the new head coach on March 22, 2018.

== Previous season ==
The Cardinals finished the 2016–17 season 12–17, 7–11 in Southland play to finish in a five-way tie for eighth place.

The season was the final year of a four-year transitional period for Incarnate Word from Division II to Division I. During year four, the Cardinals played a normal conference schedule. They were Division I for scheduling purposes and were also considered as a Division I RPI member, but were not eligible for postseason play.

== Roster ==
2017–18 Incarnate Word Cardinals men's basketball team
Players
Coaches

Pos.	#	Name	Height	Weight	Year	Previous school	Hometown
PF	00	Myles Thornton	6 ft 6 in (1.98 m)	200 lb (91 kg)	Jr	Smithson Valley HS	Selma, Texas
PG	1	Jalin Hart	5 ft 11 in (1.8 m)	160 lb (73 kg)	Sr	New Mexico Junior College	Houston, Texas
PF	3	Simi Socks	6 ft 6 in (1.98 m)	210 lb (95 kg)	Jr	Coppell HS	Bulawayo, Zimbabwe
SF	4	Christian Peevy	6 ft 6 in (1.98 m)	185 lb (84 kg)	RS Fr	Mount Carmel HS	Chicago, Illinois
C	5	Devin Wyatt	6 ft 8 in (2.03 m)	205 lb (93 kg)	Sr	Loyola Marymount	Desoto, Texas
PG	10	Cody Graham	5 ft 10 in (1.78 m)	165 lb (75 kg)	Fr	St. Pius X HS	Fresno, Texas
G	12	Augustine Ene	6 ft 4 in (1.93 m)	195 lb (88 kg)	Fr	Creekview HS	Carrollton, Texas
PF	13	Charles Brown III	6 ft 7 in (2.01 m)	215 lb (98 kg)	Jr	Murray State	New Orleans, Louisiana
G	14	Keaton Hervey	6 ft 7 in (2.01 m)	190 lb (86 kg)	Fr	Cedar Park HS	Cedar Park, Texas
G	15	Sam Burmeister	6 ft 4 in (1.93 m)	200 lb (91 kg)	RS Sr	Churchill HS	San Antonio, Texas
C	20	Marek Hulva	6 ft 8 in (2.03 m)	230 lb (104 kg)	RS So	Lewis and Clark Community College	Opava, Czech Republic
SG	23	Jorden Kite	6 ft 3 in (1.91 m)	185 lb (84 kg)	RS So	Clark HS	San Antonio, Texas
C	32	Konstantin Kulikov	7 ft 0 in (2.13 m)	235 lb (107 kg)	Jr	San Jacinto College	Oryol, Russia
G	41	Shawn Johnson	6 ft 5 in (1.96 m)	200 lb (91 kg)	Sr	Alief Hastings HS	New Orleans, Louisiana

Head coach

- Ken Burmeister (St. Mary's)

Assistant coach(es)

- Brian Curtis (Incarnate Word)
- John Smith (Northwestern State)
- Kenyon Spears (Lamar)

Legend

- (C) Team captain
- (S) Suspended
- (I) Ineligible
- (W) Walk-on
- Injured
- Current redshirt

Roster
Last update: 2017-10-04

== Schedule and results ==
Date time, TV	Opponent	Result	Record	High points	High rebounds	High assists	Site (attendance) city, state
Non-conference regular season
Nov 10, 2017*; 7:00 pm	Southwestern	W 87–71	1–0	24 – Brown III	13 – Brown III	4 – Tied	McDermott Convocation Center (1,530); San Antonio, TX
Nov 13, 2017*; 7:00 pm	Trinity	W 93–57	2–0	19 – Socks	11 – Johnson	4 – Hart	McDermott Convocation Center (1,234); San Antonio, TX
Nov 17, 2017*; 7:00 pm	McMurry	W 88–49	3–0	19 – Tied	8 – Johnson	5 – Johnson	McDermott Convocation Center (1,311); San Antonio, TX
Nov 22, 2017*; 7:00 pm	Loyola Marymount	L 87–91	3–1	20 – Peevy	9 – Johnson	7 – Hart	McDermott Convocation Center (1,588); San Antonio, TX
Nov 25, 2017*; 7:00 pm	at Houston	L 58–97	3–2	17 – Socks	9 – Peevy	3 – Tied	H&PE Arena (2,724); Houston, TX
Nov 29, 2017*; 8:00 pm, KHQ/RTNW	at No. 15 Gonzaga	L 68–103	3–3	17 – Hart	5 – Socks	3 – Johnson	McCarthey Athletic Center (6,000); Spokane, WA
Dec 5, 2017*; 7:00 pm	Texas Lutheran	W 91–63	4–3	17 – Hervey	7 – Tied	7 – Hart	McDermott Convocation Center (721); San Antonio, TX
Dec 16, 2017*; 7:00 pm	UMKC	W 77–73	5–3	20 – Socks	11 – Johnson	6 – Hart	McDermott Convocation Center (988); San Antonio, TX
Dec 19, 2017*; 8:00 pm	at UTEP	L 66–72	5–4	21 – Socks	7 – Brown III	5 – Hart	Don Haskins Center (6,023); El Paso, TX
Dec 22, 2017*; 6:00 pm, SECN	at Florida	L 60–75	5–5	13 – Brown III	7 – Johnson	1 – 5 tied	O'Connell Center (8,021); Gainesville, FL
Southland regular season
Dec 28, 2017; 6:30 pm	at McNeese State	L 62–85	5–6 (0–1)	18 – Peevy	7 – Johnson	2 – 3 tied	Burton Coliseum (743); Lake Charles, LA
Dec 30, 2017; 6:00 pm	at Nicholls State	L 60–77	5–7 (0–2)	14 – Burmeister	5 – 3 tied	3 – Hart	Stopher Gym (203); Thibodaux, LA
Jan 6, 2018; 3:00 pm	Sam Houston State	L 74–85	5–8 (0–3)	21 – Brown III	2 – 4 tied	4 – Graham	McDermott Convocation Center (1,052); San Antonio, TX
Jan 10, 2018; 7:00 pm	at Central Arkansas	L 76–92	5–9 (0–4)	24 – Tied	9 – Peevy	4 – Graham	Farris Center (1,156); Conway, AR
Jan 13, 2018; 6:00 pm, ESPN3	at Stephen F. Austin	L 63–83	5–10 (0–5)	11 – Johnson	8 – Johnson	4 – Graham	William R. Johnson Coliseum (4,699); Nacogdoches, TX
Jan 17, 2018; 7:00 pm	Lamar	L 69–90	5–11 (0–6)	24 – Brown III	3 – 3 tied	3 – Graham	McDermott Convocation Center (735); San Antonio, TX
Jan 20, 2018; 6:30 pm, ESPN3	at New Orleans	L 70–74	5–12 (0–7)	22 – Johnson	9 – Kulikov	4 – Hervey	Lakefront Arena (1,407); New Orleans, LA
Jan 24, 2018; 7:00 pm	at Houston Baptist	L 86–102	5–13 (0–8)	22 – Brown III	9 – Brown III	6 – Graham	Sharp Gymnasium (631); Houston, TX
Jan 27, 2018; 3:00 pm, ELVN	New Orleams	L 58–68	5–14 (0–9)	11 – Graham	11 – Kulikov	3 – Graham	McDermott Convocation Center (1,394); San Antonio, TX
Feb 3, 2018; 3:00 pm	Texas A&M–Corpus Christi	L 51–56	5–15 (0–10)	14 – Tied	9 – Johnson	3 – Graham	McDermott Convocation Center (1,532); San Antonio, TX
Feb 7, 2018; 7:00 pm	Southeastern Louisiana	L 68–86	5–16 (0–11)	26 – Brown III	8 – Brown III	4 – Tied	McDermott Convocation Center (601); San Antonio, TX
Feb 10, 2018; 4:00 pm	at Abilene Christian	L 69–80	5–17 (0–12)	17 – Hervey	5 – Brown III	2 – Brown III	Moody Coliseum (1,210); Abilene, TX
Feb 14, 2018; 7:00 pm, ESPN3	at Lamar	L 62–85	5–18 (0–13)	27 – Johnson	8 – Johnson	5 – Graham	Montagne Center (1,594); Beaumont, TX
Feb 17, 2018; 3:00 pm	Stephen F. Austin	L 70–81	5–19 (0–14)	23 – Johnson	8 – Johnson	5 – Tied	McDermott Convocation Center (567); San Antonio, TX
Feb 21, 2018; 7:00 pm	Northwestern State	L 54–66	5–20 (0–15)	19 – Burmeister	8 – Brown III	4 – Graham	McDermott Convocation Center (876); San Antonio, TX
Feb 24, 2018; 1:30 pm	at Texas A&M–Corpus Christi	W 69–62	6–20 (1–15)	18 – Brown III	10 – Johnson	4 – Ene	American Bank Center (1,970); Corpus Christi, TX
Feb 28, 2018; 7:00 pm	Houston Baptist	W 83–71	7–20 (2–15)	28 – Johnson	17 – Johnson	4 – Johnson	McDermott Convocation Center (1,052); San Antonio, TX
Mar 3, 2018; 3:00 pm	Abilene Christian	L 59–69	7–21 (2–16)	12 – Brown III	7 – Tied	1 – 3 Tied	McDermott Convocation Center (1,256); San Antonio, TX
*Non-conference game. ^{#}Rankings from AP Poll. (#) Tournament seedings in parentheses. All times are in Central Time.

== See also ==
- 2017–18 Incarnate Word Cardinals women's basketball team
