= 2017–18 Southeastern Louisiana Lions basketball team =

American college basketball season

2017–18 Southeastern Louisiana Lions basketball
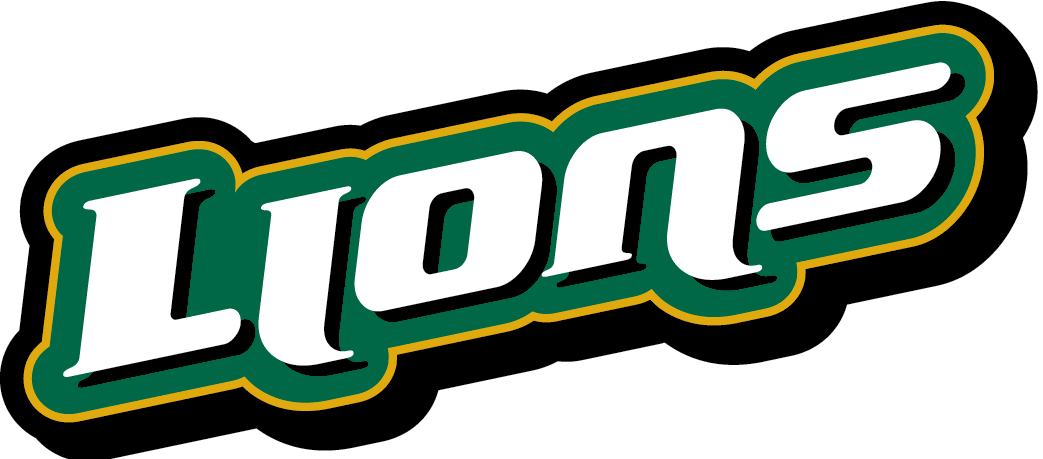

Southland regular season co-champions

NIT, First round
- Conference: Southland Conference
- Record: 22–12 (15–3 Southland)
- Head coach: Jay Ladner (4th season)
- Assistant coaches: David Kiefer; Joey Stiebing; Kyle Roane
- Home arena: University Center (Capacity: 7,500)

2017–18 Southland Conference men's basketball standings
	Conf.				Overall
Team	W		L	PCT	W		L	PCT
Southeastern Louisiana	15	–	3	.833	22	–	12	.647
Nicholls State	15	–	3	.833	21	–	11	.656
Stephen F. Austin †	14	–	4	.778	28	–	7	.800
Sam Houston State	12	–	6	.667	21	–	15	.583
Lamar	11	–	7	.611	19	–	14	.576
New Orleans	11	–	7	.611	16	–	17	.485
Central Arkansas	10	–	8	.556	18	–	17	.514
Abilene Christian	8	–	10	.444	16	–	16	.500
Texas A&M–CC	8	–	10	.444	11	–	18	.379
McNeese State	8	–	10	.444	11	–	17	.393
Incarnate Word	2	–	16	.111	7	–	21	.250
Houston Baptist	2	–	16	.111	6	–	25	.194
Northwestern State	1	–	17	.056	4	–	25	.138
† 2018 Southland tournament winner

The 2017–18 Southeastern Louisiana Lions basketball team represented Southeastern Louisiana University during the 2017–18 NCAA Division I men's basketball season. The Lions, led by fourth-year head coach Jay Ladner, played their home games at the University Center in Hammond, Louisiana as members of the Southland Conference. They finished the season 22–12, 15–3 in Southland play to finish in a tie for the Southland regular season championship with Nicholls State. As the No. 1 seed in the Southland tournament, they defeated Sam Houston State in the semifinals before losing in the championship game to Stephen F. Austin. As a regular season champion, and No. 1 seed in their conference tournament, who failed to win their conference tournament, they received an automatic bid to the National Invitation Tournament where they lost in the first round to Saint Mary's.

== Previous season ==
The Lions finished the 2016–17 season 16–16, 9–9 in Southland play to finish in seventh place. They lost in the first round of the Southland tournament to Lamar.

== Roster ==
2017–18 Southeastern Louisiana Lions men's basketball team
Players
Coaches

Pos.	#	Name	Height	Weight	Year	Hometown
G	0	Marlain Veal	5 ft 9 in (1.75 m)	145 lb (66 kg)	Jr	New Orleans, Louisiana
G	1	Quinton Thomas	6 ft 2 in (1.88 m)	175 lb (79 kg)	Sr	Baton Rouge, Louisiana
G	2	Matthew Strange	5 ft 11 in (1.8 m)	165 lb (75 kg)	Fr	The Woodlands, Texas
G	3	Joshua Filmore	6 ft 0 in (1.83 m)	175 lb (79 kg)	RS Sr	Orlando, Florida
G	4	D'Angelo West	6 ft 4 in (1.93 m)	195 lb (88 kg)	Jr	Jackson, Mississippi
	10	Eddy Polanco	6 ft 3 in (1.91 m)	195 lb (88 kg)	Sr	Bronx, New York
SG	11	Chris Mejia	6 ft 3 in (1.91 m)	190 lb (86 kg)	So	Hialeah Gardens, Florida
G	12	Von Julien	6 ft 1 in (1.85 m)	160 lb (73 kg)	Jr	Reserve, Louisiana
F	13	Moses Greenwood	6 ft 7 in (2.01 m)	221 lb (100 kg)	Jr	Sharon, Mississippi
F	15	Maxwell Starwood	6 ft 9 in (2.06 m)	250 lb (113 kg)	So	Baton Rouge, Louisiana
SF	20	Brandon Gonzalez	6 ft 6 in (1.98 m)	200 lb (91 kg)	RS Fr	Punta Gorda, Florida
F	21	Jordan Capps	6 ft 7 in (2.01 m)	220 lb (100 kg)	RS Sr	Norcross, Georgia
F	22	Patrick Bossetta	6 ft 3 in (1.91 m)	210 lb (95 kg)	So	Folsom, Louisiana
F	23	James Currington	6 ft 7 in (2.01 m)	195 lb (88 kg)	RS Sr	Tuscaloosa, Alabama
G	24	Keith Charleston	6 ft 8 in (2.03 m)	207 lb (94 kg)	RS Jr	Little Rock, Arkansas

Head coach

- Jay Ladner (Southern Miss)

Assistant coach(es)

- David Kiefer (Kansas State)
- Joey Stiebing (New Orleans)
- Kyle Roane (Southern Miss)

Legend

- (C) Team captain
- (S) Suspended
- (I) Ineligible
- (W) Walk-on
- Injured
- Current redshirt

Roster
Last update: January 20, 2018

== Schedule and results ==
Date time, TV	Rank^{#}	Opponent^{#}	Result	Record	Site (attendance) city, state
Exhibition
Nov 2, 2017*; 7:00 pm		vs. Jackson State	W 57–51		Gulfport High School; Gulfport, MS
Nov 7, 2017*; 7:00 pm		William Carey	W 80–71		University Center; Hammond, LA
Non-conference regular season
Nov 10, 2017*; 7:30 pm		Centenary	W 99–67	1–0	University Center (717); Hammond, LA
Nov 13, 2017*; 7:00 pm, CST/ESPN3		at Tulane	L 66–89	1–1	Devlin Fieldhouse (1,316); New Orleans, LA
Nov 16, 2017*; 7:00 pm		at Louisiana–Monroe	L 75–86	1–2	Fant-Ewing Coliseum (1,602); Monroe, LA
Nov 19, 2017*; 3:00 pm, ESPN3		at Valparaiso	L 50–83	1–3	Athletics-Recreation Center (2,651); Valparaiso, IN
Nov 21, 2017*; 6:00 pm, ESPN3		at Kent State	W 70–66	2–3	MAC Center (1,827); Kent, OH
Nov 24, 2017*; 1:00 pm		vs. Samford; Savannah Invitational	W 77–71	3–3	Pete Hanna Center (561); Homewood, AL
Nov 25, 2017*; 1:00 pm		vs. Mississippi Valley State; Savannah Invitational	W 73–59	4–3	Pete Hanna Center (137); Birmingham AL
Nov 28, 2017*; 7:00 pm, CST/ESPN3		Loyola New Orleans	W 80–53	5–3	University Center (754); Hammond, LA
Dec 12, 2017*; 6:00 pm, ESPN3		at UCF	L 53–61	5–4	CFE Arena (3,449); Orlando, FL
Dec 14, 2017*; 7:00 pm		Southern-New Orleans	W 106–77	6–4	University Center (525); Hammond, LA
Dec 16, 2017*; 2:00 pm		Grambling State	L 67–68	6–5	University Center (425); Hammond, LA
Dec 19, 2017*; 7:00 pm		at Louisiana	L 74–82	6–6	Cajundome (3,323); Lafayette, LA
Dec 21, 2017*; 6:00 pm, ACC Extra		at Notre Dame	L 50–86	6–7	Joyce Center (7,134); Notre Dame, IN
Southland regular season
Dec 28, 2017; 7:00 pm		Stephen F. Austin	W 73–62	7–7 (1–0)	University Center (693); Hammond, LA
Dec 31, 2017; 3:00 pm		at Central Arkansas	W 73–69	8–7 (2–0)	Farris Center (731); Conway, AR
Jan 6, 2018; 4:00 pm		at Abilene Christian	W 72–70	9–7 (3–0)	Moody Coliseum (1,106); Abilene, TX
Jan 10, 2018; 7:00 pm, ESPN3		at Lamar	W 63–58	10–7 (4–0)	Montagne Center (1,297); Beaumont, TX
Jan 13, 2018; 5:00 pm		McNeese State	L 62–71	10–8 (4–1)	University Center (744); Hammond, LA
Jan 17, 2018; 7:00 pm		Houston Baptist	W 85–69	11–8 (5–1)	University Center (762); Hammond, LA
Jan 20, 2018; 5:00 pm, ESPN3		Northwestern State	W 85–58	12–8 (6–1)	University Center (868); Hammond, LA
Jan 24, 2018; 6:30 pm, ESPN3		at Sam Houston State	L 65–75	12–9 (6–2)	Bernard G. Johnson Coliseum (1,238); Huntsville, TX
Jan 27, 2018; 6:30 pm, ESPN3		at Nicholls State	W 67–63	13–9 (7–2)	Stopher Gymnasium (1,131); Thibodaux, LA
Jan 31, 2018; 7:00 pm, ELVN/ESPN3		Texas A&M–Corpus Christi	W 67–54	13–10 (7–3)	University Center (1,023); Hammond, LA
Feb 3, 2018; 5:00 pm		Central Arkansas	W 89–84	14–10 (8–3)	University Center (769); Hammond, LA
Feb 7, 2018; 7:00 pm		at Incarnate Word	W 86–68	15–10 (9–3)	McDermott Convocation Center (601); San Antonio, TX
Feb 10, 2018; 3:30 pm		at McNeese State	W 74–67	16–10 (10–3)	Burton Coliseum (617); Lake Charles, LA
Feb 14, 2018; 7:00 pm		New Orleans	W 71–64	17–10 (11–3)	University Center (816); Hammond, LA
Feb 17, 2018; 5:00 pm		Abilene Christian	W 68–54	18–10 (12–3)	University Center (1,011); Hammond, LA
Feb 24, 2018; 6:00 pm		at Northwestern State	W 86–62	19–10 (13–3)	Prather Coliseum (1,344); Natchitoches, LA
Feb 28, 2018; 7:00 pm		at New Orleans	W 68–64	20–10 (14–3)	Lakefront Arena (1,182); New Orleans, LA
Mar 3, 2018; 5:00 pm		Nicholls State	W 69–57	21–10 (15–3)	University Center (1,774); Hammond, LA
Southland tournament
Mar 9, 2018; 5:00 pm, ESPN3	(1)	vs. (4) Sam Houston State; Semifinals	W 89–79	22–10	Leonard E. Merrell Center (2,545); Katy, TX
Mar 10, 2018; 8:00 pm, ESPN2	(1)	vs. (3) Stehphen F. Austin; Championship game	L 55–59	22–11	Leonard E. Merrell Center (3,279); Katy, TX
NIT
Mar 13, 2018*; 9:00 pm, ESPNU	(8)	at (1) No. 25 Saint Mary's; First round - Saint Mary's Bracket	L 45–89	22–12	McKeon Pavilion (1,249); Moraga, CA
*Non-conference game. ^{#}Rankings from AP Poll. (#) Tournament seedings in parentheses. All times are in Central Time.

== See also ==
- 2017–18 Southeastern Louisiana Lady Lions basketball team
