= 2017–18 Abilene Christian Wildcats men's basketball team =

American college basketball season

2017–18 Abilene Christian Wildcats men's basketball

CIT, First round
- Conference: Southland Conference
- Record: 16–16 (8–10 Southland)
- Head coach: Joe Golding (7th season)
- Assistant coaches: Brette Tanner; Ted Crass; Antonio Bostic
- Home arena: Moody Coliseum

2017–18 Southland Conference men's basketball standings
	Conf.				Overall
Team	W		L	PCT	W		L	PCT
Southeastern Louisiana	15	–	3	.833	22	–	12	.647
Nicholls State	15	–	3	.833	21	–	11	.656
Stephen F. Austin †	14	–	4	.778	28	–	7	.800
Sam Houston State	12	–	6	.667	21	–	15	.583
Lamar	11	–	7	.611	19	–	14	.576
New Orleans	11	–	7	.611	16	–	17	.485
Central Arkansas	10	–	8	.556	18	–	17	.514
Abilene Christian	8	–	10	.444	16	–	16	.500
Texas A&M–CC	8	–	10	.444	11	–	18	.379
McNeese State	8	–	10	.444	11	–	17	.393
Incarnate Word	2	–	16	.111	7	–	21	.250
Houston Baptist	2	–	16	.111	6	–	25	.194
Northwestern State	1	–	17	.056	4	–	25	.138
† 2018 Southland tournament winner

The 2017–18 Abilene Christian Wildcats men's basketball team represented Abilene Christian University during the 2017–18 NCAA Division I men's basketball season. The Wildcats were led by seventh-year head coach Joe Golding and played their home games at the Moody Coliseum in Abilene, Texas as members of the Southland Conference. They finished the season 16–16, 8–10 in Southland play to finish in a three-way tie for eighth place. They failed to qualify for the Southland tournament. They received an invitation to the CollegeInsider.com Tournament where they lost in the first round to Drake.

The season marked the Wildcats' first full season as a Division I school after a four-year transition period from Division II to Division I.

== Previous season ==
The Wildcats finished the 2016–17 season 13–16, 7–11 in Southland play to finish in a five-way tie for eighth place.

The Wildcats, in their final year of a four-year transition from Division II to Division I, were not eligible for a postseason tournament including the Southland tournament, but were considered a Division I team for scheduling purposes and a Division I RPI member.

== Roster ==
2017–18 Abilene Christian Wildcats men's basketball team
Players
Coaches

Pos.	#	Name	Height	Weight	Year	Hometown
G	0	Jaylen Franklin	6 ft 2 in (1.88 m)	205 lb (93 kg)	Jr	Jacksonville, Arkansas
G/F	1	Jaren Lewis	6 ft 6 in (1.98 m)	215 lb (98 kg)	Jr	Orlando, Florida
G	2	B. J. Maxwell	6 ft 4 in (1.93 m)	190 lb (86 kg)	RS So	Austin, Texas
G	3	Tevin Foster	5 ft 11 in (1.8 m)	180 lb (82 kg)	Sr	Lawton, Oklahoma
G	5	Payten Ricks	6 ft 2 in (1.88 m)	190 lb (86 kg)	So	Wichita, Kansas
G	10	Isaiah Tripp	6 ft 1 in (1.85 m)	190 lb (86 kg)	Sr	Baltimore, Maryland
G	11	Drake Green	6 ft 3 in (1.91 m)	195 lb (88 kg)	Sr	Houston, Texas
G	13	Paul Hiepler	6 ft 4 in (1.93 m)	170 lb (77 kg)	Fr	Camarillo, California
G	14	Trey Lenox	6 ft 3 in (1.91 m)	220 lb (100 kg)	So	Hot Springs, Arkansas
F	15	Hayden Farquhar	6 ft 7 in (2.01 m)	215 lb (98 kg)	Jr	Throckmorton, Texas
C	21	Jalone Friday	6 ft 9 in (2.06 m)	235 lb (107 kg)	RS So	Oklahoma City, Oklahoma
G	22	Chase Cobb	6 ft 1 in (1.85 m)	190 lb (86 kg)	So	Richmond, Texas
F	23	Hayden Howell	6 ft 7 in (2.01 m)	225 lb (102 kg)	Jr	Midwest City, Oklahoma
C	34	Kolton Kohl	7 ft 0 in (2.13 m)	225 lb (102 kg)	RS Fr	San Angelo, Texas
G	42	Tobias Cameron	6 ft 4 in (1.93 m)	210 lb (95 kg)	Fr	Gold Coast, Queensland, Australia

Head coach

- Joe Golding (Abilene Christian)

Assistant coach(es)

- Brette Tanner (Emporia State)
- Ted Crass (Little Rock)
- Antonio Bostic (Stephen F. Austin)

Legend

- (C) Team captain
- (S) Suspended
- (I) Ineligible
- (W) Walk-on
- Injured
- Current redshirt

Roster
Last update: January 26, 2018

== Schedule and results ==
Date time, TV	Opponent	Result	Record	Site (attendance) city, state
Non-conference regular season
Nov 10, 2017*; 7:30 pm	Randall	W 86–68	1–0	Moody Coliseum (1,117); Abilene, TX
Nov 13, 2017*; 7:00 pm	at Arkansas State	L 69–83	1–1	First National Bank Arena (2,730); Jonesboro, AR
Nov 16, 2017*; 7:00 pm	Howard Payne	W 112–62	2–1	Moody Coliseum (1,016); Abilene, TX
Nov 20, 2017*; 7:00 pm	Lipscomb	W 75–67	2–2	Moody Coliseum (1,075); Abilene, TX
Nov 25, 2017*; 1:00 pm	at Campbell; Campbell Tournament	W 85–80	3–2	Gore Arena (1,083); Buies Creek, NC
Nov 25, 2017*; 4:00 pm	vs. USC Upstate; Campbell Tournament	L 78–88	3–3	Gore Arena (1,208); Buies Creek, NC
Nov 26, 2017*; 1:00 pm	vs. Bowling Green; Campbell Tournament	W 88–83	4–3	Gore Arena (450); Buies Creek, NC
Dec 2, 2017*; 4:00 pm	Schreiner	W 71–43	5–3	Moody Coliseum (1,202); Abilene, TX
Dec 6, 2017*; 8:00 pm	at Air Force	W 62–58	6–3	Clune Arena (1,602); Colorado Springs, CO
Dec 9, 2017*; 4:00 pm	Texas State	W 72–68	7–3	Moody Coliseum (1,356); Abilene, TX
Dec 17, 2017*; 12:00 pm, ESPN3	at Lipscomb	L 65–67	7–4	Allen Arena (1,205); Nashville, TN
Dec 19, 2017*; 7:00 pm	Arlington Baptist	W 109–60	8–4	Moody Coliseum (1,219); Abilene, TX
Dec 22, 2017*; 2:00 pm, FSSW+	at No. 21 Texas Tech	L 47–74	8–5	United Supermarkets Arena (7,907); Lubbock, TX
Southland regular season
Dec 28, 2017; 7:00 pm	at New Orleans	L 74–77	8–6 (0–1)	Lakefront Arena (528); New Orleans, LA
Dec 30, 2017; 7:30 pm	Sam Houston State	W 75–72	9–6 (1–1)	Moody Coliseum (1,125); Abilene, TX
Jan 3, 2018; 7:00 pm	McNeese State	W 79–74	10–6 (2–1)	Moody Coliseum (1,183); Abilene, TX
Jan 6, 2018; 4:00 pm	Southeastern Louisiana	L 70–72	10–7 (2–2)	Moody Coliseum (1,106); Abilene, TX
Jan 10, 2018; 7:00 pm	at Houston Baptist	W 82–74	11–7 (3–2)	Sharp Gymnasium (576); Houston, TX
Jan 13, 2018; 3:00 pm	at Northwestern State	W 69–58	12–7 (4–2)	Prather Coliseum (820); Natchitoches, LA
Jan 17, 2018; 7:00 pm, ELVN	Stephen F. Austin	L 66–76	12–8 (4–3)	Moody Coliseum (1,972); Abilene, TX
Jan 20, 2018; 3:00 pm, ESPN3	at Central Arkansas	W 80–63	13–8 (5–3)	Farris Center (1,317); Conway, AR
Jan 24, 2018; 7:00 pm	at Texas A&M–Corpus Christi	L 66–80	13–9 (5–4)	American Bank Center (700); Corpus Christi, TX
Jan 31, 2018; 7:00 pm	Lamar	W 74–69	14–9 (6–4)	Moody Coliseum (1,131); Abilene, TX
Feb 3, 2018; 6:15 pm, ESPN3	at Sam Houston State	W 84–77	14–10 (6–5)	Bernard Johnson Coliseum (1,078); Huntsville, TX
Feb 7, 2018; 7:00 pm	Nicholls State	L 65–69	14–11 (6–6)	Moody Coliseum (1,207); Abilene, TX
Feb 10, 2018; 4:00 pm	Incarnate Word	W 80–69	15–11 (7–6)	Moody Coliseum (1,210); Abilene, TX
Feb 17, 2018; 5:00 pm	at Southeastern Louisiana	L 54–68	15–12 (7–7)	University Center (1,011); Hammond, LA
Feb 21, 2018; 7:00 pm	Texas A&M–Corpus Christi; Postponed (inclement weather), Make-up Feb. 22			Moody Coliseum; Abilene, TX
Feb 22, 2018; 7:00 pm	Texas A&M–Corpus Christi	L 67–76	15–13 (7–8)	Moody Coliseum (1,221); Abilene, TX
Feb 24, 2018; 4:00 pm	Central Arkansas	L 72–74	15–14 (7–9)	Moody Coliseum (1,450); Abilene, TX
Feb 28, 2018; 7:00 pm, ESPN3	at Stephen F. Austin	L 56–76	15–15 (7–10)	William R. Johnson Coliseum (2,912); Nacogdoches, TX
Mar 3, 2018; 3:00 pm	at Incarnate Word	W 69–59	16–15 (8–10)	McDermott Center (1,256); San Antonio, TX
CIT
Mar 12, 2018*; 1:00 pm, CBSSN	at Drake; First Round – Lou Henson Classic	L 73–80 ^{OT}	16–16	Knapp Center (3,565); Des Moines, IA
*Non-conference game. ^{#}Rankings from AP Poll. (#) Tournament seedings in parentheses. All times are in Central Time.

== See also ==
- 2017–18 Abilene Christian Wildcats women's basketball team
