= 2017–18 Nicholls State Colonels men's basketball team =

American college basketball season

2017–18 Nicholls State Colonels men's basketball

Southland regular season co-champions
- Conference: Southland Conference
- Record: 21–11 (15–3 Southland)
- Head coach: Richie Riley (2nd season)
- Assistant coaches: John Aiken; Austin Claunch; Amorrow Morgan
- Home arena: Stopher Gym

2017–18 Southland Conference men's basketball standings
	Conf.				Overall
Team	W		L	PCT	W		L	PCT
Southeastern Louisiana	15	–	3	.833	22	–	12	.647
Nicholls State	15	–	3	.833	21	–	11	.656
Stephen F. Austin †	14	–	4	.778	28	–	7	.800
Sam Houston State	12	–	6	.667	21	–	15	.583
Lamar	11	–	7	.611	19	–	14	.576
New Orleans	11	–	7	.611	16	–	17	.485
Central Arkansas	10	–	8	.556	18	–	17	.514
Abilene Christian	8	–	10	.444	16	–	16	.500
Texas A&M–CC	8	–	10	.444	11	–	18	.379
McNeese State	8	–	10	.444	11	–	17	.393
Incarnate Word	2	–	16	.111	7	–	21	.250
Houston Baptist	2	–	16	.111	6	–	25	.194
Northwestern State	1	–	17	.056	4	–	25	.138
† 2018 Southland tournament winner

The 2017–18 Nicholls State Colonels men's basketball team represented Nicholls State University during the 2017–18 NCAA Division I men's basketball season. The Colonels, led by second-year head coach Richie Riley, played their home games at Stopher Gym in Thibodaux, Louisiana as members of the Southland Conference. They finished the season 21–11, 15–3 in Southland play to earn a share of the regular season championship. As the No. 2 seed in the Southland tournament, they lost in the semifinals to Stephen F. Austin.

On March 15, 2018, head coach Richie Riley left Nicholls to take the head coaching job at South Alabama. Two weeks later, the school promoted assistant coach Austin Claunch to head coach.

== Previous season ==
The Colonels finished the 2016–17 season 14–17, 7–11 in Southland play to finish in a five-way tie for eighth place. They failed to qualify for the Southland tournament. Senior forward Liam Thomas led Division I in blocks per game with a 4.19 average.

== Roster ==
2017–18 Nicholls State Colonels men's basketball team
Players
Coaches

Pos.	#	Name	Height	Weight	Year	Hometown
C	0	Legend Robertin	7 ft 1 in (2.16 m)	280 lb (127 kg)	Sr	London, England
G	1	Tevon Saddler	6 ft 6 in (1.98 m)	215 lb (98 kg)	Sr	Aberdeen, Maryland
G	2	Jahvaughn Powell	6 ft 0 in (1.83 m)	170 lb (77 kg)	Sr	Tallahassee, Florida
G	3	Lafayette Rutledge	6 ft 0 in (1.83 m)	175 lb (79 kg)	Sr	Gautier, Mississippi
G	4	Zaquavian Smith	6 ft 0 in (1.83 m)	170 lb (77 kg)	Jr	Statesboro, Georgia
G/F	5	Maurice O'Field	6 ft 5 in (1.96 m)	220 lb (100 kg)	GS	Cleveland, Ohio
G	10	Zach Young	6 ft 1 in (1.85 m)	195 lb (88 kg)	Sr	Wellington, New Zealand
F/C	22	Ryghe Lyons	6 ft 10 in (2.08 m)	230 lb (104 kg)	Fr	Slidell, Louisiana
G	23	Roddy Peters	6 ft 4 in (1.93 m)	195 lb (88 kg)	Sr	Washington, D.C.
C	24	Daniel Regis	6 ft 7 in (2.01 m)	235 lb (107 kg)	Jr	Grenada
G	25	Kevin Johnson	5 ft 10 in (1.78 m)	160 lb (73 kg)	Fr	Thibodaux, Louisiana
G/F	33	Rafe Blades	6 ft 5 in (1.96 m)	170 lb (77 kg)	Fr	Thibodaux, Louisiana
F	35	Kimani Jackson	6 ft 7 in (2.01 m)	225 lb (102 kg)	RS Sr	Flint, Michigan
G	40	Stevie Repichowski	6 ft 5 in (1.96 m)	195 lb (88 kg)	RS Sr	Lansing, Michigan

Head coach

- Richie Riley (Eastern Kentucky)

Assistant coach(es)

- John Aiken (Southern Maine)
- Austin Claunch (Emory)
- Amorrow Morgan

Legend

- (C) Team captain
- (S) Suspended
- (I) Ineligible
- (W) Walk-on
- Injured
- Current redshirt

Roster
Last update: January 20, 2018

== Schedule and results ==
Date time, TV	Rank^{#}	Opponent^{#}	Result	Record	Site (attendance) city, state
Non-conference regular season
Nov 10, 2017*; 7:00 pm		at Texas–Rio Grande Valley	W 111–106	1–0	UTRGV Fieldhouse (924); Edinburg, TX
Nov 14, 2017*; 5:30 pm, FS1		at No. 5 Villanova; Battle 4 Atlantis campus site game	L 77–113	1–1	Wells Fargo Center (8,517); Philadelphia, PA
Nov 17, 2017*; 7:00 pm		Spring Hill	W 127–83	2–1	Stopher Gym; Thibodaux, LA
Nov 19, 2017*; 5:00 pm, FCS Central		at Western Kentucky; Battle 4 Atlantis campus site game	L 86–100	2–2	E.A. Diddle Arena (3,378); Bowling Green, KY
Nov 23, 2017*; 1:00 pm		vs. Presbyterian; Battle 4 Atlantis Mainland Bracket semifinals	W 76–64	3–2	Retriever Activities Center (146); Catonsville, MD
Nov 24, 2017*; 1:30 pm		vs. UMBC; Battle 4 Atlantis Mainland Bracket championship	L 88–89	3–3	Retriever Activities Center (489); Catonsville, MD
Nov 27, 2017*; 7:00 pm		Blue Mountain	W 104–68	4–3	Stopher Gym (237); Thibodaux, LA
Dec 1, 2017*; 7:00 pm		Louisiana	L 80–105	4–4	Stopher Gym (733); Thibodaux, LA
Dec 3, 2017*; 6:00 pm		Idaho	L 68–79	4–5	Stopher Gym (253); Thibodaux, LA
Dec 16, 2017*; 6:00 pm		Culver-Stockton	W 92–51	5–5	Stopher Gym (122); Thibodaux, LA
Dec 18, 2017*; 7:00 pm, ESPN3		at Tulane	L 69–76	5–6	Devlin Fieldhouse (1,162); New Orleans, LA
Dec 20, 2017*; 7:00 pm		Mobile	W 96–52	6–6	Stopher Gym (158); Thibodaux, LA
Dec 23, 2017*; 3:00 pm		at Seattle	L 89–95	6–7	Connolly Center (841); Seattle, WA
Southland regular season
Dec 28, 2017; 7:00 pm		Northwestern State	W 87–46	7–7 (1–0)	Stopher Gym (333); Thibodaux, LA
Dec 30, 2017; 3:30 pm		Incarnate Word	W 77–60	8–7 (2–0)	Stopher Gym (203); Thibodaux, LA
Jan 3, 2018; 7:00 pm, ESPN3		at Stephen F. Austin	L 64–81	8–8 (2–1)	William R. Johnson Coliseum (2,241); Nacogdoches, TX
Jan 6, 2018; 7:00 pm		at Houston Baptist	W 72–71	9–8 (3–1)	Sharp Gymnasium (598); Houston, TX
Jan 10, 2018; 7:00 pm		McNeese State	W 85–80	10–8 (4–1)	Stopher Gym (266); Thibodaux, LA
Jan 13, 2018; 3:00 pm		Central Arkansas	W 86–79	11–8 (5–1)	Stopher Gym (315); Thibodaux, LA
Jan 16, 2018; 7:00 pm		Texas A&M–Corpus Christi	W 91–61	12–8 (6–1)	Stopher Gym (213); Thibodaux, LA
Jan 24, 2018; 7:00 pm, ESPN3		at Lamar	W 79–74	13–8 (7–1)	Montagne Center (1,834); Beaumont, TX
Jan 27, 2018; 6:30 pm, ESPN3		Southeastern Louisiana	L 63–67	13–9 (7–2)	Stopher Gym (1,131); Thibodaux, LA
Feb 3, 2018; 4:15 pm		at New Orleans	W 81–64	14–9 (8–2)	Lakefront Arena (2,103); New Orleans, LA
Feb 7, 2018; 7:00 pm		at Abilene Christian	W 69–65	15–9 (9–2)	Moody Coliseum (1,207); Abilene, TX
Feb 10, 2018; 3:00 pm		Houston Baptist	W 94–67	16–9 (10–2)	Stopher Gym (477); Thibodaux, LA
Feb 14, 2018; 8:15 pm, ELVN		Sam Houston State	W 73–72	17–9 (11–2)	Stopher Gym (505); Thibodaux, LA
Feb 17, 2018; 3:00 pm, ESPN3		at Central Arkansas	W 87–83	18–9 (12–2)	Farris Center (2,912); Conway, AR
Feb 21, 2018; 6:30 pm		at McNeese State	W 96–79	19–9 (13–2)	Burton Coliseum (807); Lake Charles, LA
Feb 24, 2018; 6:00 pm		New Orleans	W 78–64	20–9 (14–2)	Stopher Gym (1,007); Thibodaux, LA
Feb 28, 2018; 6:30 pm		at Northwestern State	W 73–70	21–9 (15–2)	Prather Coliseum (903); Natchitoches, LA
Mar 3, 2018; 5:00 pm		at Southeastern Louisiana	L 57–69	21–10 (15–3)	University Center (1,774); Hammond, LA
Southland tournament
Mar 9, 2018; 7:30 pm, ESPN3	(2)	vs. (3) Stephen F. Austin; Semifinals	L 66–78	21–11	Merrell Center (2,545); Katy, TX
*Non-conference game. ^{#}Rankings from AP Poll. (#) Tournament seedings in parentheses. All times are in Central Time.

== See also ==
2017–18 Nicholls State Colonels women's basketball team
