= 2017–18 Sam Houston State Bearkats men's basketball team =

American college basketball season

2017–18 Sam Houston State Bearkats men's basketball

CIT, Semifinals
- Conference: Southland Conference
- Record: 21–15 (12–6 Southland)
- Head coach: Jason Hooten (8th season)
- Assistant coaches: Kyle Campbell (1st season); Chris Mudge (8th season); Chuck Taylor (2nd season)
- Home arena: Bernard Johnson Coliseum (Capacity: 6,110)

2017–18 Southland Conference men's basketball standings
	Conf.				Overall
Team	W		L	PCT	W		L	PCT
Southeastern Louisiana	15	–	3	.833	22	–	12	.647
Nicholls State	15	–	3	.833	21	–	11	.656
Stephen F. Austin †	14	–	4	.778	28	–	7	.800
Sam Houston State	12	–	6	.667	21	–	15	.583
Lamar	11	–	7	.611	19	–	14	.576
New Orleans	11	–	7	.611	16	–	17	.485
Central Arkansas	10	–	8	.556	18	–	17	.514
Abilene Christian	8	–	10	.444	16	–	16	.500
Texas A&M–CC	8	–	10	.444	11	–	18	.379
McNeese State	8	–	10	.444	11	–	17	.393
Incarnate Word	2	–	16	.111	7	–	21	.250
Houston Baptist	2	–	16	.111	6	–	25	.194
Northwestern State	1	–	17	.056	4	–	25	.138
† 2018 Southland tournament winner

The 2017–18 Sam Houston State Bearkats men's basketball team represented Sam Houston State University during the 2017–18 NCAA Division I men's basketball season. The Bearkats, led by eighth-year head coach Jason Hooten, played their home games at the Bernard Johnson Coliseum in Huntsville, Texas as members of the Southland Conference. They finished the season 21–15, 12–6 in Southland play to finish in fourth place. They defeated New Orleans in the quarterfinals of the Southland tournament before losing in the semifinals to Southeastern Louisiana. They were invited to the CollegeInsider.com Tournament where, after a first round bye, they defeated Eastern Michigan in the second round and UTSA in the quarterfinals before losing in the semifinals to Northern Colorado.

== Previous season ==
The Bearkats finished the 2016–17 season 1–13, 10–8 in Southland play to finish in a tie for fifth place. They defeated Central Arkansas and Houston Baptist to advance to the semifinals of the Southland tournament where they lost to New Orleans. Despite having 21 wins, they did not participate in a postseason tournament.

== Roster ==
2017–18 Sam Houston State Bearkats men's basketball team
Players
Coaches

Pos.	#	Name	Height	Weight	Year	Hometown
G/F	0	Albert Almanza	6 ft 6 in (1.98 m)	195 lb (88 kg)	Jr	Austin, Texas
F	1	Abrian Edwards	6 ft 5 in (1.96 m)	210 lb (95 kg)	Jr	Pflugerville, Texas
G	2	Cameron Delaney	6 ft 4 in (1.93 m)	205 lb (93 kg)	Jr	Harker Heights, Texas
G	3	Devin Jackson	6 ft 2 in (1.88 m)	175 lb (79 kg)	Jr	Houston, Texas
G	4	Dajuan Jones	5 ft 10 in (1.78 m)	165 lb (75 kg)	Fr	Killeen, Texas
F/C	5	Josh Boutte	6 ft 6 in (1.98 m)	225 lb (102 kg)	Jr	New Iberia, Louisiana
G/F	10	Dillon Todd	6 ft 4 in (1.93 m)	180 lb (82 kg)	Fr	Huffman, Texas
G	11	John Dewey III	6 ft 0 in (1.83 m)	170 lb (77 kg)	Jr	Bronx, New York
F/C	13	Bubba Furlong	6 ft 9 in (2.06 m)	240 lb (109 kg)	Fr	Waco, Texas
G	15	Josh Delaney	6 ft 0 in (1.83 m)	173 lb (78 kg)	Jr	Harker Heights, Texas
G	20	Jamal Williams	6 ft 5 in (1.96 m)	200 lb (91 kg)	Sr	Houston, Texas
G	22	Marcus Harris	6 ft 0 in (1.83 m)	180 lb (82 kg)	Jr	San Antonio, Texas
F	23	Christopher Galbreath Jr.	6 ft 7 in (2.01 m)	210 lb (95 kg)	Sr	Chicago, Illinois
F	24	Manny Gatkek	6 ft 8 in (2.03 m)	160 lb (73 kg)	Fr	Amarillo, Texas
F	32	Freddy Bitondo	6 ft 7 in (2.01 m)	215 lb (98 kg)	Jr	Montreal, Quebec, Canada
C	33	Justin Van Pelt	6 ft 11 in (2.11 m)	220 lb (100 kg)	RS Fr	Cypress, Texas
F/C	35	Chidozie Ndu	6 ft 11 in (2.11 m)	225 lb (102 kg)	Fr	Lagos, Nigeria

Head coach

- Jason Hooten (Tarleton State)

Assistant coach(es)

- Kyle Campbell (Hastings)
- Chris Mudge (Texas)
- Chuck Taylor (Wayne State (MI))

Legend

- (C) Team captain
- (S) Suspended
- (I) Ineligible
- (W) Walk-on
- Injured
- Current redshirt

Roster
Last update: January 20, 2018

== Schedule and results ==
Date time, TV	Rank^{#}	Opponent^{#}	Result	Record	Site (attendance) city, state
Non-conference regular season
Nov 11, 2017*; 6:30 pm		UT Tyler	W 91–51	1–0	Bernard G. Johnson Coliseum (821); Huntsville, TX
Nov 14, 2017*; 6:30 pm		Hardin-Simmons	W 72–56	2–0	Bernard G. Johnson Coliseum (805); Huntsville, TX
Nov 18, 2017*; 9:00 pm		at Idaho	L 54–63	2–1	Memorial Gym (1,187); Moscow, ID
Nov 22, 2017*; 5:30 pm, FloSports		vs. Central Michigan; Great Alaska Shootout quarterfinals	L 60–71	2–2	Alaska Airlines Center (1,579); Anchorage, AK
Nov 23, 2017*; 8:30 pm, FloSports		vs. College of Charleston; Great Alaska Shootout consolation round	L 49–59	2–3	Alaska Airlines Center; Anchorage, AK
Nov 25, 2017*; 3:00 pm, FloSports		vs. Santa Clara; Great Alaska Shootout 7th place game	W 73–59	3–3	Alaska Airlines Arena (1,823); Seattle, WA
Nov 28, 2017*; 6:30 pm, ESPN3		Schreiner	W 81–55	4–3	Bernard G. Johnson Coliseum (873); Huntsville, TX
Nov 30, 2017*; 6:30 pm, ESPN3		St. Thomas	W 77–54	5–3	Bernard G. Johnson Coliseum (727); Huntsville, TX
Dec 4, 2017*; 7:00 pm, FSSW		at No. 23 Baylor	L 56–84	5–4	Ferrell Center (5,015); Waco, TX
Dec 13, 2017*; 7:00 pm, SECN		at Ole Miss	L 69–82	5–5	The Pavilion at Ole Miss (5,054); Oxford, MS
Dec 15, 2017*; 6:30 pm		Little Rock	W 57–55	6–5	Bernard G. Johnson Coliseum (636); Huntsville, TX
Dec 19, 2017*; 7:00 pm, SECN		at LSU	L 58–80	6–6	Pete Maravich Assembly Center (8,151); Baton Rouge, LA
Dec 22, 2017*; 12:00 pm		Utah Valley	L 64–75	6–7	Bernard G. Johnson Coliseum (610); Huntsville, TX
Southland regular season
Dec 30, 2017; 7:30 pm		at Abilene Christian	L 72–75	6–8 (0–1)	Moody Coliseum (1,125); Abilene, TX
Jan 3, 2018; 6:30 pm		Central Arkansas	W 82–76	7–8 (1–1)	Bernard G. Johnson Coliseum (599); Huntsville, TX
Jan 6, 2018; 3:00 pm		at Incarnate Word	W 85–74	8–8 (2–1)	McDermott Convocation Center (1,052); San Antonio, TX
Jan 10, 2018; 7:00 pm		at Texas A&M–Corpus Christi	W 82–50	9–8 (3–1)	American Bank Center (1,722); Corpus Christi, TX
Jan 13, 2018; 6:15 pm		Houston Baptist	W 81–68	10–8 (4–1)	Bernard G. Johnson Coliseum (946); Huntsville, TX
Jan 17, 2018; 6:30 pm		Northwestern State	W 75–52	11–8 (5–1)	Bernard G. Johnson Coliseum (1,075); Huntsville, TX
Jan 20, 2018; 4:30 pm, ESPN3		at Lamar	L 77–84 ^{OT}	11–9 (5–2)	Montagne Center (1,500); Beaumont, TX
Jan 24, 2018; 6:30 pm, ESPN3		Southeastern Louisiana	W 75–65	12–9 (6–2)	Bernard G. Johnson Coliseum (1,238); Huntsville, TX
Jan 27, 2018; 6:00 pm, ESPN3		at Stephen F. Austin	L 66–82	12–10 (6–3)	William R. Johnson Coliseum (7,081); Nacogdoches, TX
Jan 30, 2018; 6:30 pm		at McNeese State	W 67–57	13–10 (7–3)	Burton Coliseum (902); Lake Charles, LA
Feb 3, 2018; 6:15 pm, ESPN3		Abilene Christian	W 84–77	14–10 (8–3)	Bernard G. Johnson Coliseum (1,078); Huntsville, TX
Feb 7, 2018; 6:30 pm, ESPN3		Texas A&M–Corpus Christi	W 66–64	15–10 (9–3)	Bernard G. Johnson Coliseum (1,123); Huntsville, TX
Feb 10, 2018; 6:15 pm, ESPN3		Lamar	W 71–69	16–10 (10–3)	Bernard G. Johnson Coliseum (1,166); Huntsville, TX
Feb 14, 2018; 8:15 pm		at Nicholls State	L 72–73	16–11 (10–4)	Stopher Gymnasium (505); Thibodaux, LA
Feb 17, 2018; 7:00 pm		at Houston Baptist	W 86–78	17–11 (11–4)	Sharp Gymnasium (918); Houston, TX
Feb 21, 2018; 6:30 pm		New Orleans	W 57–54	18–111 (12–4)	Bernard G. Johnson Coliseum (1,043); Huntsville, TX
Feb 28, 2018; 7:00 pm		at Central Arkansas	L 70–88	18–12 (12–5)	Farris Center (1,312); Conway, AR
Mar 3, 2018; 7:00 pm, ESPN3		Stephen F. Austin	L 53–65	18–13 (12–6)	Bernard G. Johnson Coliseum (2,043); Huntsville, TX
Southland tournament
Mar 8, 2018; 5:00 pm, ESPN3	(4)	vs. (5) New Orleans; Quarterfinals	W 85–63	19–13	Leonard E. Merrell Center (1,839); Katy, TX
Mar 9, 2018; 5:00 pm, ESPN3	(4)	vs. (1) Southeastern Louisiana; Semifinals	L 79–89	19–14	Leonard E. Merrell Center (2,545); Katy, TX
CIT
Mar 19, 2018*; 6:30 pm		Eastern Michigan; Second round	W 69–62	20–14	Bernard G. Johnson Coliseum (322); Huntsville, TX
Mar 22, 2018*; 7:00 pm		at UTSA; Quarterfinals	W 76–69	21–14	Convocation Center (1,352); San Antonio, TX
Mar 28, 2018*; 8:00 pm, CBSSN		at Northern Colorado; Semifinals	L 80–99	21–15	Bank of Colorado Arena (2,019); Greeley, CO
*Non-conference game. (#) Tournament seedings in parentheses. All times are in Central Time.

== See also ==
- 2017–18 Sam Houston State Bearkats women's basketball team
