= 2017–18 Stephen F. Austin Lumberjacks basketball team =

American college basketball season

2017–18 Stephen F. Austin Lumberjacks basketball

Southland tournament champions

NCAA tournament, First round
- Conference: Southland Conference
- Record: 0–7, 28 wins vacated (0–4 Southland, 14 wins vacated)
- Head coach: Kyle Keller (2nd season)
- Assistant coaches: Jeremy Cox; Desmond Haymon; Wade Mason
- Home arena: William R. Johnson Coliseum (Capacity: 7,203)

2017–18 Southland Conference men's basketball standings
	Conf.				Overall
Team	W		L	PCT	W		L	PCT
Southeastern Louisiana	15	–	3	.833	22	–	12	.647
Nicholls State	15	–	3	.833	21	–	11	.656
Stephen F. Austin †	14	–	4	.778	28	–	7	.800
Sam Houston State	12	–	6	.667	21	–	15	.583
Lamar	11	–	7	.611	19	–	14	.576
New Orleans	11	–	7	.611	16	–	17	.485
Central Arkansas	10	–	8	.556	18	–	17	.514
Abilene Christian	8	–	10	.444	16	–	16	.500
Texas A&M–CC	8	–	10	.444	11	–	18	.379
McNeese State	8	–	10	.444	11	–	17	.393
Incarnate Word	2	–	16	.111	7	–	21	.250
Houston Baptist	2	–	16	.111	6	–	25	.194
Northwestern State	1	–	17	.056	4	–	25	.138
† 2018 Southland tournament winner

The 2017–18 Stephen F. Austin Lumberjacks basketball team represented Stephen F. Austin State University during the 2017–18 NCAA Division I men's basketball season. The Lumberjacks were led by second-year head coach Kyle Keller and played their home games at the William R. Johnson Coliseum in Nacogdoches, Texas as members of the Southland Conference. They finished the season 28–7, 14–4 in Southland play, to finish in third place. They defeated Central Arkansas, Nicholls State, and Southeastern Louisiana to become champions of the Southland tournament. They received the Southland's automatic bid to the NCAA tournament where they lost in the first round to Texas Tech.

On May 20, 2020, following the discovery of an administrative error in certifying eligibility for student-athletes, Stephen F. Austin reached an agreement with the NCAA to vacate hundreds of wins across multiple sports from 2013 to 2019, including all 117 men's basketball wins from the 2014–15 to 2018–19 seasons.

== Previous season ==
The Lumberjacks finished the 2016–17 season 18–18, 12–6 in Southland play, to finish in a three-way tie for second place. They defeated Lamar in the quarterfinals of the Southland tournament to advance to the semifinals where they lost to Texas A&M–Corpus Christi. They were invited to the CollegeInsider.com Tournament where they lost in the first round to Idaho.

== Roster ==
2017–18 Stephen F. Austin Lumberjacks men's basketball team
Players
Coaches

Pos.	#	Name	Height	Weight	Year	Hometown
G	0	Aaron Augustin	5 ft 11 in (1.8 m)	185 lb (84 kg)	So	Suwanee, GA
G/F	1	Kevon Harris	6 ft 6 in (1.98 m)	225 lb (102 kg)	So	Ellenwood, GA
F	3	Leon Gilmore III	6 ft 7 in (2.01 m)	220 lb (100 kg)	Sr	Houston, TX
G	4	Ty Charles	6 ft 5 in (1.96 m)	210 lb (95 kg)	Sr	Kennedale, TX
G	5	Shannon Bogues	6 ft 2 in (1.88 m)	185 lb (84 kg)	Jr	Killeen, TX
G	10	John Comeaux	5 ft 11 in (1.8 m)	185 lb (84 kg)	So	Beaumont, TX
G	11	Ivan Canete	6 ft 4 in (1.93 m)	190 lb (86 kg)	Sr	Lake Worth, FL
F	12	Stefon Fisher	6 ft 9 in (2.06 m)	235 lb (107 kg)	Fr	Hyattsville, MD
G	15	Rance Cole	5 ft 11 in (1.8 m)	165 lb (75 kg)	So	Coldspring, TX
G	20	Harrison Perkins	6 ft 4 in (1.93 m)	200 lb (91 kg)	Jr	Nacogdoches, TX
F	22	T. J. Holyfield	6 ft 8 in (2.03 m)	220 lb (100 kg)	Jr	Albuquerque, NM
F	23	Nathan Bain	6 ft 6 in (1.98 m)	200 lb (91 kg)	So	Freeport, Bahamas
F	24	Samuli Nieminen	6 ft 7 in (2.01 m)	215 lb (98 kg)	So	Helsinki, Finland
C	32	Jovan Grujic	7 ft 0 in (2.13 m)	230 lb (104 kg)	Jr	Pančevo, Serbia

Head coach

- Kyle Keller (Louisiana Tech)

Assistant coach(es)

- Jeremy Cox (Colorado Mesa)
- Desmond Haymon (Stephen F. Austin)
- Wade Mason (Tulane)

Legend

- (C) Team captain
- (S) Suspended
- (I) Ineligible
- (W) Walk-on
- Injured
- Current redshirt

Roster
Last update: May 24, 2024

== Schedule and results ==
Date time, TV	Rank^{#}	Opponent^{#}	Result	Record	Site (attendance) city, state
Non-conference regular season
Nov 11, 2017*; 2:00 p.m.		at Longwood	W 74–61	1–0	Willett Hall (1,412); Farmville, VA
Nov 15, 2017*; 7:00 p.m., ESPN3		St. Edward's	W 89–66	2–0	William R. Johnson Coliseum (3,127); Nacogdoches, TX
Nov 16, 2017*; 7:00 p.m., ESPN3		LeTourneau	W 91–68	3–0	William R. Johnson Coliseum (2,642); Nacogdoches, TX
Nov 18, 2017*; 4:00 p.m., Facebook Live		Howard Payne	W 118–64	4–0	William R. Johnson Coliseum (1,881); Nacogdoches, TX
Nov 22, 2017*; 7:00 p.m., SECN		at Mississippi State	L 75–80	4–1	Humphrey Coliseum (7,687); Starkville, MS
Nov 26, 2017*; 2:00 p.m., Facebook Live		Florida A&M	W 79–63	5–1	William R. Johnson Coliseum (1,691); Nacogdoches, TX
Nov 28, 2017*; 7:30 p.m., ESPN3		North Dakota State	W 54–50	6–1	William R. Johnson Coliseum (4,398); Nacogdoches, TX
Dec 2, 2017*; 3:30 p.m., ESPN3		Louisiana–Monroe	W 68–65	7–1	William R. Johnson Coliseum (3,941); Nacogdoches, TX
Dec 6, 2017*; 6:30 p.m.		at Louisiana Tech	W 85–83	8–1	Thomas Assembly Center (3,041); Ruston, LA
Dec 9, 2017*; 2:00 p.m., ESPN3		Rice	W 81–62	9–1	William R. Johnson Coliseum (4,071); Nacogdoches, TX
Dec 16, 2017*; 12:00 p.m., SECN		at LSU	W 83–82	10–1	Pete Maravich Assembly Center (9,695); Baton Rouge, LA
Dec 19, 2017*; 8:00 p.m., ESPNU		at Missouri	L 81–82	10–2	Mizzou Arena (15,061); Columbia, MO
Dec 21, 2017*; 6:00 p.m., ESPN3		Arlington Baptist	W 116–66	11–2	William R. Johnson Coliseum (1,859); Nacogdoches, TX
Southland regular season
Dec 28, 2017; 7:00 p.m.		at Southeastern Louisiana	L 62–73	11–3 (0–1)	University Center (693); Hammond, LA
Jan 3, 2018; 7:00 p.m., ESPN3		Nicholls State	W 81–64	12–3 (1–1)	William R. Johnson Coliseum (2,241); Nacogdoches, TX
Jan 6, 2018; 3:30 p.m., ELVN		at Northwestern State	W 64–56	13–3 (2–1)	Prather Coliseum (1,322); Natchitoches, LA
Jan 10, 2018; 7:00 p.m., ESPN3		New Orleans	W 78–68	14–3 (4–1)	William R. Johnson Coliseum (4,173); Nacogdoches, TX
Jan 13, 2018; 6:00 p.m., ESPN3		Incarnate Word	W 83–63	15–3 (5–1)	William R. Johnson Coliseum (4,699); Nacogdoches, TX
Jan 17, 2018; 7:00 p.m., ELVN		at Abilene Christian	W 76–66	16–3 (5–1)	Moody Coliseum (1,972); Abilene, TX
Jan 24, 2018; 7:00 p.m.		at Central Arkansas	L 92–100	16–4 (5–2)	Farris Center (2,225); Conway, AR
Jan 27, 2018; 6:00 p.m., ESPN3		Sam Houston State	W 82–66	17–4 (6–2)	William R. Johnson Coliseum (7,081); Nacogdoches, TX
Jan 31, 2018; 7:00 p.m., ESPN3		Houston Baptist	W 102–82	18–4 (7–2)	William R. Johnson Coliseum (3,312); Nacogdoches, TX
Feb 3, 2018; 4:30 p.m., ESPN3		at Lamar	L 54–76	18–5 (7–3)	Montagne Center (1,743); Beaumont, TX
Feb 8, 2018; 6:30 p.m., ELVN		at McNeese State	W 99–95	19–5 (8–3)	Burton Coliseum (647); Lake Charles, LA
Feb 10, 2018; 6:00 p.m., ESPN3		Northwestern State	W 97–50	20–5 (9–3)	William R. Johnson Coliseum (6,238); Nacogdoches, TX
Feb 14, 2018; 7:00 p.m.		at Texas A&M–Corpus Christi	W 87–68	21–5 (10–3)	American Bank Center (1,216); Corpus Christi, TX
Feb 17, 2018; 3:00 p.m.		at Incarnate Word	W 81–70	22–5 (11–3)	McDermott Convocation Center (567); San Antonio, TX
Feb 21, 2018; 7:00 p.m., ESPN3		Central Arkansas	W 97–62	23–5 (12–3)	William R. Johnson Coliseum (3,012); Nacogdoches, TX
Feb 24, 2018; 6:00 p.m., ESPN3		Lamar	L 66–71	23–6 (12–4)	William R. Johnson Coliseum (7,023); Nacogdoches, TX
Feb 28, 2018; 7:00 p.m., ESPN3		Abilene Christian	W 76–56	24–6 (13–4)	William R. Johnson Coliseum (2,912); Nacogdoches, TX
Mar 3, 2018; 7:00 p.m., ESPN3		at Sam Houston State	W 65–53	25–6 (14–4)	Bernard G. Johnson Coliseum (2,043); Huntsville, TX
Southland Conference tournament
Mar 8, 2018; 7:30 p.m.	(3)	vs. (7) Central Arkansas; Quarterfinals	W 86–64	26–6	Leonard E. Merrell Center (1,839); Katy, TX
Mar 9, 2018; 7:30 p.m., ESPN3	(3)	vs. (2) Nicholls State; Semifinals	W 78–66	27–6	Leonard E. Merrell Center (2,545); Katy, TX
Mar 10, 2018; 8:00 p.m., ESPN2	(3)	vs. (1) Southeastern Louisiana; Championship	W 59–55	28–6	Leonard E. Merrell Center (3,279); Katy, TX
NCAA tournament
Mar 15, 2018*; 6:27 p.m., truTV	(14 E)	vs. (3 E) No. 14 Texas Tech; First round	L 60–70	28–7	American Airlines Center (18,703); Dallas, TX
*Non-conference game. ^{#}Rankings from AP poll. (#) Tournament seedings in parentheses. E=East. All times are in Central Time.

== See also ==
- 2017–18 Stephen F. Austin Ladyjacks basketball team
- List of vacated and forfeited games in college basketball
