= 2018 Southland Conference men's basketball tournament =

- Classification: Division I
- Season: 2017–18
- Teams: 8
- Site: Merrell Center; Katy, Texas
- Champions: Stephen F. Austin (5th title)
- Winning coach: Kyle Keller (1st title)
- MVP: T. J. Holyfield (Stephen F. Austin)
- Television: ESPN3, ESPN2

2017–18 Southland Conference men's basketball standings
	Conf.				Overall
Team	W		L	PCT	W		L	PCT
Southeastern Louisiana	15	–	3	.833	22	–	12	.647
Nicholls State	15	–	3	.833	21	–	11	.656
Stephen F. Austin †	14	–	4	.778	28	–	7	.800
Sam Houston State	12	–	6	.667	21	–	15	.583
Lamar	11	–	7	.611	19	–	14	.576
New Orleans	11	–	7	.611	16	–	17	.485
Central Arkansas	10	–	8	.556	18	–	17	.514
Abilene Christian	8	–	10	.444	16	–	16	.500
Texas A&M–CC	8	–	10	.444	11	–	18	.379
McNeese State	8	–	10	.444	11	–	17	.393
Incarnate Word	2	–	16	.111	7	–	21	.250
Houston Baptist	2	–	16	.111	6	–	25	.194
Northwestern State	1	–	17	.056	4	–	25	.138
† 2018 Southland tournament winner

The 2018 Southland Conference men's basketball tournament was the postseason men's basketball tournament that completes 2017–18 season in the Southland Conference. The tournament was held at the Merrell Center in Katy, Texas from March 7–10, 2018.

Stephen F. Austin won the tournament by defeating Southeastern Louisiana in the championship game. As a result, the Lumberjacks received the conference's automatic bid to the NCAA tournament.

== Seeds ==
Teams were seeded by record within the conference, with a tiebreaker system to seed teams with identical conference records. Only the top eight teams in the conference qualified for the tournament. The top two seeds received double byes into the semifinals in the merit-based format. The No. 3 and No. 4 seeds received single byes to the quarterfinals.

Seed	School	Conference	Tiebreaker 1
1	Southeastern Louisiana	15–3	2–0 vs. Nicholls State
2	Nicholls State	15–3	0–2 vs. Southeastern Louisiana
3	Stephen F. Austin	14–4	
4	Sam Houston State	12–6	
5	New Orleans	11–7	2–0 vs. McNeese
6	Lamar	11–7	1–1 vs. McNeese
7	Central Arkansas	10–8	
8	Texas A&M–Corpus Christi	8–10	3–0 vs. ACU/McNeese
–	Abilene Christian	8–10	1–2 vs. TAMU–CC/McNeese
–	McNeese State	8–10	0–2 vs. ACU/TAMU–CC

== Schedule ==
Session	Game	Time*	Matchup^{#}	Score	Television
First round – Wednesday, March 7, 2018
1	1	5:00 pm	No. 5 New Orleans vs. No. 8 Texas A&M–Corpus Christi	86–73	ESPN3
1	2	7:30 pm	No. 6 Lamar vs. No. 7 Central Arkansas	57–67	ESPN3
Quarterfinals – Thursday, March 8, 2018
2	3	5:00 pm	No. 4 Sam Houston State vs. No. 5 New Orleans	85–63	ESPN3
2	4	7:30 pm	No. 3 Stephen F. Austin vs. No. 7 Central Arkansas	86–64	ESPN3
Semifinals – Friday, March 9, 2018
3	5	5:00 pm	No. 1 Southeastern Louisiana vs. No. 4 Sam Houston State	89–79	ESPN3
3	6	7:30 pm	No. 2 Nicholls State vs. No. 3 Stephen F. Austin	66–78	ESPN3
Championship – Saturday, March 10, 2018
4	7	8:30 pm	No. 1 Southeastern Louisiana vs. No. 3 Stephen F. Austin	55–59	ESPN2
*Game times in CST. #-Rankings denote tournament seeding.

== Bracket ==
First round Wednesday, March 7 ESPN3
5	New Orleans	86
8	Texas A&M–CC	73
6	Lamar	57
7	Central Arkansas	67

Quarterfinals; Thursday, March 8 ESPN3
4	Sam Houston State	85
5	New Orleans	63
3	Stephen F. Austin	86
7	Central Arkansas	64

Semifinals; Friday, March 9 ESPN3
1	SE Louisiana	89
4	Sam Houston State	79
2	Nicholls State	66
3	Stephen F. Austin	78

Championship; Saturday, March 10; ESPN2
1	SE Louisiana	55
3	Stephen F. Austin	59

== See also ==
- 2018 Southland Conference women's basketball tournament
