= 2017–18 Houston Baptist Huskies men's basketball team =

American college basketball season

2017–18 Houston Baptist Huskies men's basketball
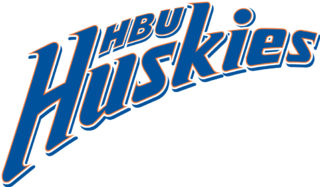
- Conference: Southland Conference
- Record: 6–25 (2–16 Southland)
- Head coach: Ron Cottrell (27th season)
- Assistant coaches: Steven Key; Justin "Jud" Kinne; Keith Berard
- Home arena: Sharp Gymnasium

2017–18 Southland Conference men's basketball standings
	Conf.				Overall
Team	W		L	PCT	W		L	PCT
Southeastern Louisiana	15	–	3	.833	22	–	12	.647
Nicholls State	15	–	3	.833	21	–	11	.656
Stephen F. Austin †	14	–	4	.778	28	–	7	.800
Sam Houston State	12	–	6	.667	21	–	15	.583
Lamar	11	–	7	.611	19	–	14	.576
New Orleans	11	–	7	.611	16	–	17	.485
Central Arkansas	10	–	8	.556	18	–	17	.514
Abilene Christian	8	–	10	.444	16	–	16	.500
Texas A&M–CC	8	–	10	.444	11	–	18	.379
McNeese State	8	–	10	.444	11	–	17	.393
Incarnate Word	2	–	16	.111	7	–	21	.250
Houston Baptist	2	–	16	.111	6	–	25	.194
Northwestern State	1	–	17	.056	4	–	25	.138
† 2018 Southland tournament winner

The 2017–18 Houston Baptist Huskies men's basketball team represented Houston Baptist University in the 2017–18 NCAA Division I men's basketball season. They were led by head coach Ron Cottrell in his 27th season at HBU. The Huskies played their home games at Sharp Gymnasium as members of the Southland Conference. They finished the season 6–25, 2–16 in Southland play to finish in a tie for 11th place. They failed to qualify for the Southland tournament.

== Previous season ==
The Huskies finished the 2016–17 season 17–14, 12–6 in Southland play to finish in a three-way tie for second place. They lost in the quarterfinals of the Southland tournament to Sam Houston State. The Huskies received an invitation to the CollegeInsider.com Tournament where they lost in the first round to Campbell.

== Roster ==
2017–18 Houston Baptist Huskies men's basketball team
Players
Coaches

Pos.	#	Name	Height	Weight	Year	Hometown
G	0	Ian DuBose	6 ft 3 in (1.91 m)	220 lb (100 kg)	Fr	Durham, North Carolina
F	2	Philip McKenzie	6 ft 4 in (1.93 m)	185 lb (84 kg)	Fr	Nassau, Bahamas
G	4	Stephen O'Suji	6 ft 0 in (1.83 m)	190 lb (86 kg)	RS Jr	Houston, Texas
F	5	David Caraher	6 ft 6 in (1.98 m)	220 lb (100 kg)	Fr	Chapel Hill, North Carolina
G	10	Tyquon Jordan	6 ft 3 in (1.91 m)	200 lb (91 kg)	So	Houston, Texas
F	11	Chukuka Emili	6 ft 7 in (2.01 m)	210 lb (95 kg)	Jr	New York, New York
F/C	12	Tim Myles	6 ft 6 in (1.98 m)	235 lb (107 kg)	GS	Rancho Cucamonga, California
G	14	Waseem Ali Jr.	6 ft 4 in (1.93 m)	185 lb (84 kg)	Fr	Schertz, Texas
C	15	Edward Hardt	6 ft 10 in (2.08 m)	245 lb (111 kg)	Jr	Phoenix, Arizona
G	21	Will Gates Jr.	6 ft 1 in (1.85 m)	190 lb (86 kg)	RS Sr	Selma, Texas
G	22	Jalon Gates	6 ft 0 in (1.83 m)	155 lb (70 kg)	So	Selma, Texas
G	23	Oliver Lynch-Daniels	6 ft 2 in (1.88 m)	180 lb (82 kg)	Fr	Chapel Hill, North Carolina
G	25	Michael Saladin	6 ft 0 in (1.83 m)	160 lb (73 kg)	So	Beaumont, Texas
G	30	Braxton Bonds	6 ft 2 in (1.88 m)	175 lb (79 kg)	RS Jr	Nashville, Tennessee
F	32	Colin Just	6 ft 6 in (1.98 m)	215 lb (98 kg)	So	Magnolia, Texas
C	44	Josh Ibarra	6 ft 11 in (2.11 m)	250 lb (113 kg)	Sr	Angleton, Texas

Head coach

- Ron Cottrell (Arkansas)

Assistant coach(es)

- Steven Key (Houston Baptist)
- Jud Kinne (Albion)
- Keith Berard (Southern Utah)

Legend

- (C) Team captain
- (S) Suspended
- (I) Ineligible
- (W) Walk-on
- Injured
- Current redshirt

Roster
Last update: January 26, 2018

== Schedule and results ==
Date time, TV	Opponent	Result	Record	Site (attendance) city, state
Non-conference regular season
Nov 10, 2017*; 6:00 pm, FSN	at Providence; 2K Classic	L 55–84	0–1	Alumni Hall (2,620); Providence, RI
Nov 14, 2017*; 7:00 pm	Arlington Baptist	W 108–67	1–1	Sharp Gymnasium (563); Houston, TX
Nov 18, 2017*; 7:30 pm	at Belmont; 2K Classic	L 88–93	1–2	Curb Event Center (1,502); Nashville, TN
Nov 19, 2017*; 3:00 pm	vs. Detroit; 2K Classic	L 109–116	1–3	Curb Events Center (350); Nashville, TN
Nov 21, 2017*; 6:00 pm, ACCN Extra	at Virginia Tech; 2K Classic	L 73–99	1–4	Cassell Coliseum (4,951); Blacksburg, VA
Nov 26, 2017*; 2:00 pm, FSN	at Oklahoma State	L 74–101	1–5	Gallagher-Iba Arena (4,325); Stillwater, OK
Nov 28, 2017*; 7:00 pm	Dallas Christian	W 96–66	2–5	Sharp Gymnasium (606); Houston, TX
Dec 2, 2017*; 7:00 pm	Texas State	W 71–52	3–5	Sharp Gymnasium (963); Houston, TX
Dec 6, 2017*; 6:00 pm	at Saint Peter's	L 74–76	3–6	Yanitelli Center (605); Jersey City, NJ
Dec 9, 2017*; 7:00 pm	at UTSA	L 71–87	3–7	Convocation Center (1,040); San Antonio, TX
Dec 15, 2017*; 7:00 pm	Barclay	W 100–65	4–7	Sharp Gymnasium (437); Houston, TX
Dec 18, 2017*; 5:00 pm, BTN	at No. 2 Michigan State	L 62–107	4–8	Breslin Center (14,797); East Lansing, MI
Dec 20, 2017*; 6:00 pm, SECN+	at Vanderbilt	L 48–81	4–9	Memorial Gymnasium (7,623); Nashville, TN
Southland regular season
Dec 28, 2017; 7:00 pm, ESPN3	at Lamar	L 68–86	4–10 (0–1)	Montagne Center (1,800); Beaumont, TX
Dec 30, 2017; 7:00 pm	New Orleans	L 57–64	4–11 (0–2)	Sharp Gymnasium (602); Houston, TX
Jan 6, 2018; 7:00 pm	Nicholls State	L 71–72	4–12 (0–3)	Sharp Gymnasium (598); Houston, TX
Jan 10, 2018; 7:00 pm	Abilene Christian	L 74–82	4–13 (0–4)	Sharp Gymnasium (576); Houston, TX
Jan 13, 2018; 6:15 pm	at Sam Houston State	L 68–81	4–14 (0–5)	Bernard Johnson Coliseum (946); Huntsville, TX
Jan 17, 2018; 7:00 pm	at Southeastern Louisiana	L 69–85	4–15 (0–6)	University Center (762); Hammond, LA
Jan 20, 2018; 7:00 pm	McNeese State	L 81–86	4–16 (0–7)	Sharp Gymnasium (962); Houston, TX
Jan 24, 2018; 7:00 pm	Incarnate Word	W 102–86	5–16 (1–7)	Sharp Gymnasium (631); Houston, TX
Jan 27, 2018; 7:00 pm, ESPN3	at Texas A&M–Corpus Christi	L 69–79 ^{OT}	5–17 (1–8)	American Bank Center; Corpus Christi, TX
Jan 31, 2018; 7:00 pm, ESPN3	at Stephen F. Austin	L 82-102	5–18 (1–9)	William R. Johnson Coliseum (3,312); Nacogdoches, TX
Feb 7, 2018; 7:00 pm, ELVN	Central Arkansas	L 80–100	5–19 (1–10)	Sharp Gymnasium (532); Houston, TX
Feb 10, 2018; 3:00 pm	at Nicholls State	L 67–94	5–20 (1–11)	Stopher Gymnasium (477); Thibodaux, LA
Feb 14, 2018; 6:30 pm	at Northwestern State	W 77–70	6–20 (2–11)	Prather Coliseum (920); Natchitoches, LA
Feb 17, 2018; 7:00 pm	Sam Houston State	L 78–86	6–21 (2–12)	Sharp Gymnasium (918); Houston, TX
Feb 21, 2018; 7:00 pm	Lamar	L 73–87	6–22 (2–13)	Sharp Gymnasium (612); Houston, TX
Feb 24, 2018; 3:30 pm	at McNeese State	L 79–88	6–23 (2–14)	Burton Coliseum (717); Lake Charles, LA
Feb 28, 2018; 7:00 pm	at Incarnate Word	L 71–83	6–24 (2–15)	McDermott Center (1,052); San Antonio, TX
Mar 3, 2018; 7:00 pm	Texas A&M–Corpus Christi	L 87–92	6–25 (2–16)	Sharp Gymnasium (842); Houston, TX
*Non-conference game. ^{#}Rankings from AP Poll. (#) Tournament seedings in parentheses. All times are in Central Source:.

== See also ==
- 2017–18 Houston Baptist Huskies women's basketball team
