= 2017–18 Texas A&M–Corpus Christi Islanders men's basketball team =

American college basketball season

2017–18 Texas A&M–Corpus Christi Islanders men's basketball
- Conference: Southland Conference
- Record: 11–18 (8–10 Southland)
- Head coach: Willis Wilson (7th season)
- Assistant coaches: Marty Gross; Mark Dannhoff; Terry Johnson
- Home arena: American Bank Center; Dugan Wellness Center

2017–18 Southland Conference men's basketball standings
	Conf.				Overall
Team	W		L	PCT	W		L	PCT
Southeastern Louisiana	15	–	3	.833	22	–	12	.647
Nicholls State	15	–	3	.833	21	–	11	.656
Stephen F. Austin †	14	–	4	.778	28	–	7	.800
Sam Houston State	12	–	6	.667	21	–	15	.583
Lamar	11	–	7	.611	19	–	14	.576
New Orleans	11	–	7	.611	16	–	17	.485
Central Arkansas	10	–	8	.556	18	–	17	.514
Abilene Christian	8	–	10	.444	16	–	16	.500
Texas A&M–CC	8	–	10	.444	11	–	18	.379
McNeese State	8	–	10	.444	11	–	17	.393
Incarnate Word	2	–	16	.111	7	–	21	.250
Houston Baptist	2	–	16	.111	6	–	25	.194
Northwestern State	1	–	17	.056	4	–	25	.138
† 2018 Southland tournament winner

The 2017–18 Texas A&M–Corpus Christi Islanders men's basketball team represented Texas A&M University–Corpus Christi in the 2017–18 NCAA Division I men's basketball season. The Islanders were led by head coach Willis Wilson, in his seventh season at Texas A&M–Corpus Christi as members of the Southland Conference. They played their home games at the American Bank Center and the Dugan Wellness Center. They finished the season 11–18, 8–10 in Southland play to finish in a three-way tie for eighth place. Due to tiebreakers, they received the No. 8 seed in the Southland tournament where they lost to New Orleans in the first round.

== Previous season ==
The Islanders finished the 2016–17 season 24–12, 12–6 in Southland play to finish in a three-way tie for second place. They defeated Stephen F. Austin to advance to the championship game of the Southland tournament where they lost to New Orleans. They received an invitation to the CollegeInsider.com Tournament where they defeated Georgia State, Weber State, Fort Wayne, and UMBC to advance to the championship game where they lost to Saint Peter's.

== Roster ==
2017–18 Texas A&M–Corpus Christi Islanders men's basketball team
Players
Coaches

Pos.	#	Name	Height	Weight	Year	Hometown
G	0	Kyle Brown	5 ft 10 in (1.78 m)	150 lb (68 kg)	RS So	Missouri City, Texas
G	2	Myles Smith	6 ft 0 in (1.83 m)	195 lb (88 kg)	Fr	Klein, Texas
G	3	Joe Kilgore	6 ft 5 in (1.96 m)	190 lb (86 kg)	Sr	Houston, Texas
G	4	Ehab Amin	6 ft 4 in (1.93 m)	200 lb (91 kg)	Sr	Alexandria, Egypt
G	5	David Bloom	6 ft 4 in (1.93 m)	205 lb (93 kg)	Sr	Plano, Texas
F	10	Perry Francois	6 ft 8 in (2.03 m)	225 lb (102 kg)	So	North Miami, Florida
G	11	Kareem South	6 ft 2 in (1.88 m)	185 lb (84 kg)	RS So	Toronto, Ontario, Canada
G	12	Peyton Smith	6 ft 0 in (1.83 m)	190 lb (86 kg)	Fr	Corpus Christi, Texas
F	13	Deion Rhea	6 ft 7 in (2.01 m)	225 lb (102 kg)	Fr	Porter, Texas
F	14	Elijah Schmidt	6 ft 8 in (2.03 m)	195 lb (88 kg)	So	Spring, Texas
F	15	Sean Rhea	6 ft 7 in (2.01 m)	230 lb (104 kg)	Fr	Porter, Texas
G	20	Colin Hale	6 ft 1 in (1.85 m)	170 lb (77 kg)	So	Aransas Pass, Texas
G	21	Tre Gray	6 ft 2 in (1.88 m)	170 lb (77 kg)	Fr	Oakland, California
G	22	Emmanuel Toney	6 ft 2 in (1.88 m)	185 lb (84 kg)	RS Sr	Bowie, Maryland
G/F	24	Jamell Bradley	6 ft 6 in (1.98 m)	205 lb (93 kg)	RS Fr	San Antonio, Texas
F	34	York Benjamin	6 ft 8 in (2.03 m)	215 lb (98 kg)	RS Fr	Tulsa, Oklahoma

Head coach

- Willis Wilson (Rice)

Assistant coach(es)

- Marty Gross (Jacksonville)
- Mark Dannhoff (UW–La Crosse)
- Terry Johnson (Stanislaus State)

Legend

- (C) Team captain
- (S) Suspended
- (I) Ineligible
- (W) Walk-on
- Injured
- Current redshirt

Roster
Last update: January 26, 2018

== Schedule and results ==
Date time, TV	Rank^{#}	Opponent^{#}	Result	Record	Site (attendance) city, state
Exhibition
Nov. 2, 2017*; 7:00 pm		Texas A&M–Kingsville	L 80–82 ^{OT}		American Bank Center (1,947); Corpus Christi, TX
Non-conference regular season
Nov. 10, 2017*; 7:30 pm		Our Lady of the Lake	W 69–68	1–0	Dugan Wellness Center (1,177); Corpus Christi, TX
Nov. 13, 2017*; 7:00 pm, FCS		at No. 25 Baylor	L 46–70	1–1	Ferrell Center (4,454); Waco, TX
Nov. 15, 2017*; 7:00 pm		Texas–Rio Grande Valley; South Texas Showdown	L 75–82	1–2	American Bank Center (1,437); Corpus Christi, TX
Nov. 19, 2017*; 12:00 pm, SECN+		at Georgia	L 65–68	1–3	Stegeman Coliseum (6,220); Athens, GA
Nov. 24, 2017*; TBA		at UTSA	L 58–72	1–4	UTSA Convocation Center (965); San Antonio, TX
Nov. 29, 2017*; 7:00 pm		Texas State	L 53–66	1–5	Strahan Coliseum (1,548); San Marcos, TX
Dec. 1, 2017*; 7:00 pm		Texas Lutheran	W 80–42	2–5	Dugan Wellness Center (1,072); Corpus Christi, TX
Dec. 6, 2017*; 7:00 pm		at UTRGV; South Texas Showdown	L 78–82	2–6	UTRGV Fieldhouse (764); Edinburg, TX
Dec. 15, 2017*; 7:00 pm		St. Mary's (TX)	W 71–55	3–6	Dugan Wellness Center (1,011); Corpus Christi, TX
Dec. 19, 2017*; 6:00 pm, SECN		at Ole Miss	L 63–85	3–7	The Pavilion at Ole Miss (6,102); Oxford, MS
Southland regular season
Dec 28, 2017; 1:00 pm		at Central Arkansas	L 69–81	3–8 (0–1)	Farris Center (548); Conway, AR
Dec 30, 2017; 7:30 pm		Lamar	L 72–77	3–9 (0–2)	American Bank Center (2,472); Corpus Christi, TX
Jan 3, 2018; 7:00 pm		Northwestern State	W 67–65	4–9 (1–2)	American Bank Center (1,117); Corpus Christi, TX
Jan 10, 2018; 7:00 pm, KDF		Sam Houston State	L 50–82	4–10 (1–3)	American Bank Center (1,722); Corpus Christi, TX
Jan 13, 2018; 4:15 pm		at New Orleans	L 55–61	4–11 (1–4)	Lakefront Arena (731); New Orleans, LA
Jan 16, 2018; 7:30 pm		at Nicholls State	L 61–91	4–12 (1–5)	Stopher Gymnasium (213); Thibodaux, LA
Jan 24, 2018; 7:00 pm, KDF		Abilene Christian	W 80–66	5–12 (2–5)	American Bank Center (700); Corpus Christi, TX
Jan 27, 2018; 7:30 pm, ESPN3		Houston Baptist	W 79–69 ^{OT}	6–12 (3–5)	American Bank Center; Corpus Christi, TX
Jan 31, 2018; 7:00 pm, ELVN		at Southeastern Louisiana	W 67–54	7–12 (4–5)	University Center (1,023); Hammond, LA
Feb 3, 2018; 3:00 pm		at Incarnate Word	W 56–51	8–12 (5–5)	McDermott Convocation Center (1,532); San Antonio, TX
Feb 7, 2018; 6:30 pm, ESPN3		at Sam Houston State	L 64–66	8–13 (5–6)	Bernard G. Johnson Coliseum (1,123); Huntsville, TX
Feb 10, 2018; 7:00 pm, ESPN3		New Orleans	L 53–62	8–14 (5–7)	American Bank Center (3,317); Corpus Christi, TX
Feb 14, 2018; 7:00 pm, KDF		Stephen F. Austin	L 68–87	8–15 (5–8)	American Bank Center (1,216); Corpus Christi, TX
Feb 17, 2018; 4:30 pm, ESPN3		at Lamar	L 76–79	8–16 (5–9)	Montagne Center (1,953); Beaumont, TX
Feb 21, 2018; 7:00 pm		at Abilene Christian; Postponed (inclement weather), Make-up Feb. 22			Moody Coliseum; Abilene, TX
Feb 22, 2018; 7:00 pm		at Abilene Christian	W 76–67	9–16 (6–9)	Moody Coliseum (1,221); Abilene, TX
Feb 24, 2018; 1:30 pm, KDF		Incarnate Word	L 62–69	9–17 (6–10)	American Bank Center (1,970); Corpus Christi, TX
Feb 28, 2018; 7:00 pm, ELVN		McNeese State	W 82–70	10–17 (7–10)	American Bank Center (1,235); Corpus Christi, TX
Mar 3, 2018; 7:00 pm		at Houston Baptist	W 92–87	11–17 (8–10)	Sharp Gymnasium (842); Houston, TX
Southland tournament
Mar 7, 2018; 5:00 pm	(8)	vs. (5) New Orleans; First Round	L 76–83	11–18	Leonard E. Merrell Center (970); Katy, TX
*Non-conference game. ^{#}Rankings from AP Poll. (#) Tournament seedings in parentheses.

== See also ==
2017–18 Texas A&M–Corpus Christi Islanders women's basketball team
