= 2017–18 Northwestern State Demons basketball team =

American college basketball season

2017–18 Northwestern State Demons basketball
- Conference: Southland Conference
- Record: 4–25 (1–17 Southland)
- Head coach: Mike McConathy (19th season)
- Assistant coaches: Jeff Moore; Bill Lewit; Jacob Spielbauer
- Home arena: Prather Coliseum

2017–18 Southland Conference men's basketball standings
	Conf.				Overall
Team	W		L	PCT	W		L	PCT
Southeastern Louisiana	15	–	3	.833	22	–	12	.647
Nicholls State	15	–	3	.833	21	–	11	.656
Stephen F. Austin †	14	–	4	.778	28	–	7	.800
Sam Houston State	12	–	6	.667	21	–	15	.583
Lamar	11	–	7	.611	19	–	14	.576
New Orleans	11	–	7	.611	16	–	17	.485
Central Arkansas	10	–	8	.556	18	–	17	.514
Abilene Christian	8	–	10	.444	16	–	16	.500
Texas A&M–CC	8	–	10	.444	11	–	18	.379
McNeese State	8	–	10	.444	11	–	17	.393
Incarnate Word	2	–	16	.111	7	–	21	.250
Houston Baptist	2	–	16	.111	6	–	25	.194
Northwestern State	1	–	17	.056	4	–	25	.138
† 2018 Southland tournament winner

The 2017–18 Northwestern State Demons basketball team represented Northwestern State University during the 2017–18 NCAA Division I men's basketball season. The Demons, led by 19th-year head coach Mike McConathy, played their home games at Prather Coliseum in Natchitoches, Louisiana as members of the Southland Conference. They finished the season 4–25, 1–17 in Southland play to finish in last place. They failed to qualify for the Southland tournament.

== Previous season ==
The Demons finished the 2016–17 season 13–16, 7–11 in Southland play to finish in a five-way tie for eighth place. They failed to qualify for the Southland tournament.

== Roster ==
2017–18 Northwestern State Demons men's basketball team
Players
Coaches

Pos.	#	Name	Height	Weight	Year	Hometown
G	0	C.J. Jones	5 ft 10 in (1.78 m)	160 lb (73 kg)	Fr	Monroe, Louisiana
G	1	Iziahiah Sweeney	6 ft 3 in (1.91 m)	190 lb (86 kg)	Sr	Compton, California
G	2	Caleb Starks	6 ft 3 in (1.91 m)	195 lb (88 kg)	Fr	Lafayette, Louisiana
G	10	Malik Metoyer	6 ft 7 in (2.01 m)	200 lb (91 kg)	Jr	Clarence, Louisiana
G	13	Jacob Guest	6 ft 4 in (1.93 m)	190 lb (86 kg)	So	Bossier City, Louisiana
G	15	Czar Perry	6 ft 0 in (1.83 m)	170 lb (77 kg)	Fr	El Dorado, Arkansas
F/C	20	Ishmael Lane	6 ft 8 in (2.03 m)	250 lb (113 kg)	Jr	Port Allen, Louisiana
G	21	Vontay Ott	6 ft 3 in (1.91 m)	185 lb (84 kg)	Fr	Victorville, California
G	22	DeAndre Love	6 ft 4 in (1.93 m)	190 lb (86 kg)	Jr	Seattle, Washington
F	23	Darian Dixon	6 ft 8 in (2.03 m)	220 lb (100 kg)	Fr	Bowie, Maryland
G	32	Cody Cambre	6 ft 4 in (1.93 m)	205 lb (93 kg)	Jr	French Settlement, Louisiana
F	34	Brandon Hutton	6 ft 5 in (1.96 m)	215 lb (98 kg)	So	Chicago, Illinois
C	42	Larry Owens	6 ft 8 in (2.03 m)	260 lb (118 kg)	So	Monroe, Louisiana
G	44	Cameron Lazare	5 ft 11 in (1.8 m)	202 lb (92 kg)	Sr	Baton Rouge, Louisiana

Head coach

- Mike McConathy (Louisiana Tech)

Assistant coach(es)

- Jeff Moore (Missouri Valley)
- Bill Lewit (Salisbury)
- Jacob Spielbauer (William Penn)

Legend

- (C) Team captain
- (S) Suspended
- (I) Ineligible
- (W) Walk-on
- Injured
- Current redshirt

Roster
Last update: January 26, 2018

== Schedule and results ==
Date time, TV	Opponent	Result	Record	Site (attendance) city, state
Non-conference regular season
Nov 10, 2017*; 7:15 pm, LHN	at Texas	L 59–105	0–1	Erwin Center (9,516); Austin, TX
Nov 12, 2017*; 4:00 pm	Le Tourneau	L 84–99	0–2	Prather Coliseum (1,203); Natchitoches, LA
Nov 15, 2017*; 7:00 pm, ESPN3	at SMU	L 35–81	0–3	Moody Coliseum (6,769); Dallas, TX
Nov 17, 2017*; 6:30 pm	Rice	L 65–87	0–4	Prather Coliseum (1,312); Natchitoches, LA
Nov 21, 2017*; 7:30 pm	at Louisiana–Monroe	W 76–61	1–4	Fant–Ewing Coliseum (1,927); Monroe, LA
Nov 24, 2017*; 8:00 pm	at Colorado State	L 60–72	1–5	Moby Arena (2,819); Fort Collins, CO
Nov 29, 2017*; 6:30 pm	Lyon	W 67–56	2–5	Prather Coliseum (760); Natchitoches, LA
Dec 9, 2017*; 4:00 pm	at Louisiana College	W 88–58	3–5	Prather Coliseum (1,137); Natchitoches, LA
Dec 16, 2017*; 5:45 pm	LSU–Shreveport	L 84–85	3–6	Prather Coliseum (877); Natchitoches, LA
Dec 19, 2017*; 6:00 pm, FSOK	at No. 17 Oklahoma	L 68–105	3–7	Lloyd Noble Center (7,945); Norman, OK
Dec 20, 2017*; 8:00 pm, P12N	at Utah	L 62–84	3–8	Huntsman Center (13,125); Salt Lake City, UT
Southland regular season
Dec 28, 2017; 7:00 pm	at Nicholls State	L 46–87	3–9 (0–1)	Stopher Gymnasium (333); Thibodaux, LA
Dec 30, 2017; 3:30 pm	at McNeese State	L 63–72	3–10 (0–2)	Burton Coliseum (997); Lake Charles, LA
Jan 3, 2018; 7:00 pm	at Texas A&M–Corpus Christi	L 65–67	3–11 (0–3)	American Bank Center (1,117); Corpus Christi, TX
Jan 6, 2018; 3:30 pm, ELVN	Stephen F. Austin	L 56–64	3–12 (0–4)	Prather Coliseum (1,322); Natchitoches, LA
Jan 13, 2018; 3:00 pm	Abilene Christian	L 58–69	3–13 (0–5)	Prather Coliseum (820); Natchitoches, LA
Jan 17, 2018; 6:30 pm	at Sam Houston State	L 52–75	3–14 (0–6)	Bernard G. Johnson Coliseum (1,075); Huntsville, TX
Jan 20, 2018; 5:00 pm	at Southeastern Louisiana	L 58–85	3–15 (0–7)	University Center (868); Hammond, LA
Jan 24, 2018; 6:30 pm	New Orleans	L 67–73	3–16 (0–8)	Prather Coliseum (1,522); Natchitoches, LA
Jan 27, 2018; 3:00 pm	Central Arkansas	L 78–95	3–17 (0–9)	Prather Coliseum (1,920); Natchitoches, LA
Jan 31, 2018; 7:00 pm	at New Orleans	L 64–82	3–18 (0–10)	Lakefront Arena (731); New Orleans, LA
Feb 3, 2018; 3:30 pm, ESPN3	McNeese State	L 62–75	3–19 (0–11)	Prather Coliseum (1,315); Natchitoches, LA
Feb 7, 2018; 6:30 pm	Lamar	L 75–79	3–20 (0–12)	Prather Coliseum (820); Natchitoches, LA
Feb 10, 2018; 6:00 pm, ESPN3	at Stephen F. Austin	L 50–97	3–21 (0–13)	William R. Johnson Coliseum (6,238); Nacogdoches, TX
Feb 14, 2018; 6:30 pm	Houston Baptist	L 70–77	3–22 (0–14)	Prather Coliseum (920); Natchitoches, LA
Feb 21, 2018; 7:00 pm	at Incarnate Word	W 66–54	4–22 (1–14)	McDermott Convocation Center (876); San Antonio, TX
Feb 24, 2018; 3:00 pm	Southeastern Louisiana	L 62–86	4–23 (1–15)	Prather Coliseum (1,344); Natchitoches, LA
Feb 28, 2018; 6:30 pm	Nicholls State	L 70–73	4–24 (1–16)	Prather Coliseum (903); Natchitoches, LA
Mar 3, 2018; 3:00 pm	at Central Arkansas	L 58–61	4–25 (1–17)	Farris Center (1,835); Conway, AR
*Non-conference game. ^{#}Rankings from AP Poll. (#) Tournament seedings in parentheses. All times are in Central Time.

== See also ==
- 2017–18 Northwestern State Lady Demons basketball team
