= 2017–18 Central Arkansas Bears basketball team =

American college basketball season

2017–18 Central Arkansas Bears basketball

CBI, Quarterfinals
- Conference: Southland Conference
- Record: 18–17 (10–8 Southland)
- Head coach: Russ Pennell (4th season)
- Assistant coaches: Anthony Boone (4th season); Matt Scherbenske; Tyler Miller (1st season)
- Home arena: Farris Center (Capacity: 6,000)

2017–18 Southland Conference men's basketball standings
	Conf.				Overall
Team	W		L	PCT	W		L	PCT
Southeastern Louisiana	15	–	3	.833	22	–	12	.647
Nicholls State	15	–	3	.833	21	–	11	.656
Stephen F. Austin †	14	–	4	.778	28	–	7	.800
Sam Houston State	12	–	6	.667	21	–	15	.583
Lamar	11	–	7	.611	19	–	14	.576
New Orleans	11	–	7	.611	16	–	17	.485
Central Arkansas	10	–	8	.556	18	–	17	.514
Abilene Christian	8	–	10	.444	16	–	16	.500
Texas A&M–CC	8	–	10	.444	11	–	18	.379
McNeese State	8	–	10	.444	11	–	17	.393
Incarnate Word	2	–	16	.111	7	–	21	.250
Houston Baptist	2	–	16	.111	6	–	25	.194
Northwestern State	1	–	17	.056	4	–	25	.138
† 2018 Southland tournament winner

The 2017–18 Central Arkansas Bears basketball team represented the University of Central Arkansas during the 2017–18 NCAA Division I men's basketball season. The Bears were led by fourth-year head coach Russ Pennell and played their home games at the Farris Center in Conway, Arkansas as members of the Southland Conference. They finished the season 18–17, 10–8 in Southland play to finish in seventh place. They defeated Lamar in the first round of the Southland tournament before losing in the quarterfinals to Stephen F. Austin. They were invited to the College Basketball Invitational where they defeated Seattle before losing in the quarterfinals to Jacksonville State.

== Previous season ==
The Bears finished the 2016–17 season 8–24, 7–11 in Southland play to finish in a five-way tie for eighth place. They lost in the first round of the Southland tournament to Sam Houston State.

== Roster ==
2017–18 Central Arkansas Bears men's basketball team
Players
Coaches

Pos.	#	Name	Height	Weight	Year	Hometown
PF	0	S. K. Shittu	6 ft 9 in (2.06 m)	209 lb (95 kg)	Fr	Rogers, Arkansas
PG	1	Jordan Howard	5 ft 11 in (1.8 m)	180 lb (82 kg)	Sr	Chandler, Arizona
F	2	Ethan Lee	6 ft 6 in (1.98 m)	205 lb (93 kg)	Sr	Camden, Arkansas
G	3	Tyler Simmons	6 ft 2 in (1.88 m)	175 lb (79 kg)	Jr	Greenbrier, Arkansas
G	10	Mathieu Kamba	6 ft 5 in (1.96 m)	210 lb (95 kg)	Sr	Calgary, Alberta, Canada
G	12	Darraja Parnell	6 ft 4 in (1.93 m)	195 lb (88 kg)	So	Andover, Kansas
F	13	Otas Iyekekpolor	6 ft 8 in (2.03 m)	220 lb (100 kg)	Jr	Edmonton, Canada
C	15	Hayden Koval	7 ft 0 in (2.13 m)	210 lb (95 kg)	Fr	Prosper, Texas
G	20	Matthew Mondesir	6 ft 5 in (1.96 m)	200 lb (91 kg)	Fr	Los Angeles, California
F/C	22	Tanner Schmit	6 ft 8 in (2.03 m)	220 lb (100 kg)	Jr	Buffalo, New York
F	23	Aaron Weidenaar	6 ft 7 in (2.01 m)	205 lb (93 kg)	So	Bozeman, Montana
F	24	Jared Chatham	6 ft 8 in (2.03 m)	185 lb (84 kg)	RS Fr	Los Angeles, California
SG	25	Thatch Unruh	6 ft 5 in (1.96 m)	190 lb (86 kg)	Jr	Branson, Missouri
G	33	Jordan Grant	6 ft 1 in (1.85 m)	185 lb (84 kg)	So	Harrison, Arkansas
C	35	Brandon Vanover	7 ft 0 in (2.13 m)	250 lb (113 kg)	RS Fr	Little Rock, Arkansas
PG	55	DeAndre Jones	5 ft 11 in (1.8 m)	160 lb (73 kg)	Fr	Boise, Idaho

Head coach

- Russ Pennell (Central Arkansas)

Assistant coach(es)

- Anthony Boone (Mississippi)
- Matt Scherbenske (Kentucky)
- Tyler Miller (Montana Western)

Legend

- (C) Team captain
- (S) Suspended
- (I) Ineligible
- (W) Walk-on
- Injured
- Current redshirt

Roster
Last update: 26 January 2018

== Schedule and results ==
Date time, TV	Rank^{#}	Opponent^{#}	Result	Record	Site (attendance) city, state
Non-Conference regular season
10 Nov 2017*; 12:00 pm, FSSW		at No. 24 Baylor	L 66–107	0–1	Ferrell Center (7,791); Waco, TX
12 Nov 2017*; 4:00 pm		University of the Ozarks	W 99–51	1–1	Farris Center (685); Conway, AR
15 Nov 2017*; 10:00 pm, P12N		at No. 23 UCLA	L 101–106 ^{OT}	1–2	Pauley Pavilion (6,782); Los Angeles, CA
19 Nov 2017*; 1:00 pm		Alcorn State	W 102–76	2–2	Farris Center (542); Conway, AR
21 Nov 2017*; 6:50 pm		at South Carolina State	W 73–64	3–2	SHM Memorial Center (254); Orangeburg, SC
25 Nov 2017*; 11:00 pm		at Tulsa	L 72–92	3–3	Reynolds Center (3,259); Tulsa, OK
27 Nov 2017*; 7:00 pm		Morehead State	W 82–78	4–3	Farris Center (715); Conway, AR
29 Nov 2017*; 6:30 pm		at Little Rock	L 65–71	4–4	Jack Stephens Center (3,189); Little Rock, AR
4 Dec 2017*; 9:00 pm		at San Francisco	L 76–78	4–5	War Memorial Gym (1,087); San Francisco, CA
6 Dec 2017*; 9:00 pm, P12N		at California	W 96–69	5–5	Haas Pavilion (7,813); Berkeley, CA
9 Dec 2017*; 7:00 pm		Little Rock	W 69–54	6–5	Farris Center (2,412); Conway, AR
17 Dec 2017*; 1:00 pm		at Morehead State	L 94–98 ^{OT}	6–6	Ellis Johnson Arena (2,208); Morehead, KY
20 Dec 2017*; 10:00 pm, P12N		at Oregon	L 82–96	6–7	Matthew Knight Arena (6,908); Eugene, OR
Southland regular season
28 Dec 2017; 1:00 pm		Texas A&M–Corpus Christi	W 81–69	7–7 (1–0)	Farris Center (548); Conway, AR
31 Dec 2017; 3:00 pm		Southeastern Louisiana	L 69–73	7–7 (1–1)	Farris Center (731); Conway, AR
3 Jan 2018; 6:30 pm		at Sam Houston State	L 76–82	7–9 (1–2)	Bernard G. Johnson Coliseum (599); Huntsville, TX
6 Jan 2018; 4:30 pm, ESPN3		at Lamar	W 100–91 ^{2OT}	8–9 (2–2)	Montagne Center (1,478); Beaumont, TX
10 Jan 2018; 7:00 pm		Incarnate Word	W 92–76	9–9 (3–2)	Farris Center (1,156); Conway, AR
13 Jan 2018; 4:00 pm		at Nicholls State	L 79–86	9–10 (3–3)	Stopher Gymnasium (315); Thibodaux, LA
17 Jan 2018; 7:00 pm		at New Orleans	W 81–57	10–10 (4–3)	Lakefront Arena (471); New Orleans, LA
20 Jan 2018; 3:00 pm, ESPN3		Abilene Christian	L 63–80	10–11 (4–4)	Farris Center (1,317); Conway, AR
24 Jan 2018; 7:00 pm		Stephen F. Austin	W 100–92	11–11 (5–4)	Farris Center (2,225); Conway, AR
27 Jan 2018; 3:00 pm		at Northwestern State	W 95–78	12–11 (6–4)	Prather Coliseum (1,920); Natchitoches, LA
3 Feb 2018; 5:00 pm		at Southeastern Louisiana	W 89–84	12–12 (6–5)	University Center (769); Hammond, LA
7 Feb 2018; 7:00 pm		at Houston Baptist	W 100–80	13–12 (7–5)	Sharp Gymnasium (532); Houston, TX
14 Feb 2018; 7:00 pm		McNeese State	L 72–76	13–13 (7–6)	Farris Center (873); Conway, AR
17 Feb 2018; 3:00 pm, ESPN3		Nicholls State	L 83–87	13–14 (7–7)	Farris Center (2,912); Conway, AR
21 Feb 2018; 7:00 pm, ESPN3		at Stephen F. Austin	L 62–97	13–15 (7–8)	William R. Johnson Coliseum (3,012); Nacogdoches, TX
24 Feb 2018; 4:00 pm		at Abilene Christian	W 74–72	14–15 (8–8)	Moody Coliseum (1,450); Abilene, TX
28 Feb 2018; 7:00 pm		Sam Houston State	W 88–70	15–15 (9–8)	Farris Center (1,312); Conway, AR
3 Mar 2018; 3:00 pm		Northwestern State	W 61–58	16–15 (10–8)	Farris Center (1,835); Conway, AR
Southland tournament
7 Mar 2018; 7:30 pm, ESPN3	(7)	vs. (6) Lamar; First round	W 67–57	17–15	Leonard E. Merrill Center (970); Katy, TX
8 Mar 2018; 7:30 pm, ESPN3	(7)	vs. (3) Stephen F. Austin; Quarterfinals	L 64–86	17–16	Leonard E. Merrill Center (1,839); Katy, TX
CBI
14 Mar 2018*; 9:00 pm		at Seattle; First round	W 92–90 ^{OT}	18–16	Connolly Center (639); Seattle, WA
19 Mar 2018*; 5:30 pm		Jacksonville State; Quarterfinals	L 59–80	18–17	Farris Center (2,570); Conway, AR
*Non-conference game. ^{#}Rankings from AP Poll. (#) Tournament seedings in parentheses. All times are in Central Time.

== See also ==
- 2017–18 Central Arkansas Sugar Bears basketball team
