= Kyle Keller (basketball) =

American basketball coach (born 1968)

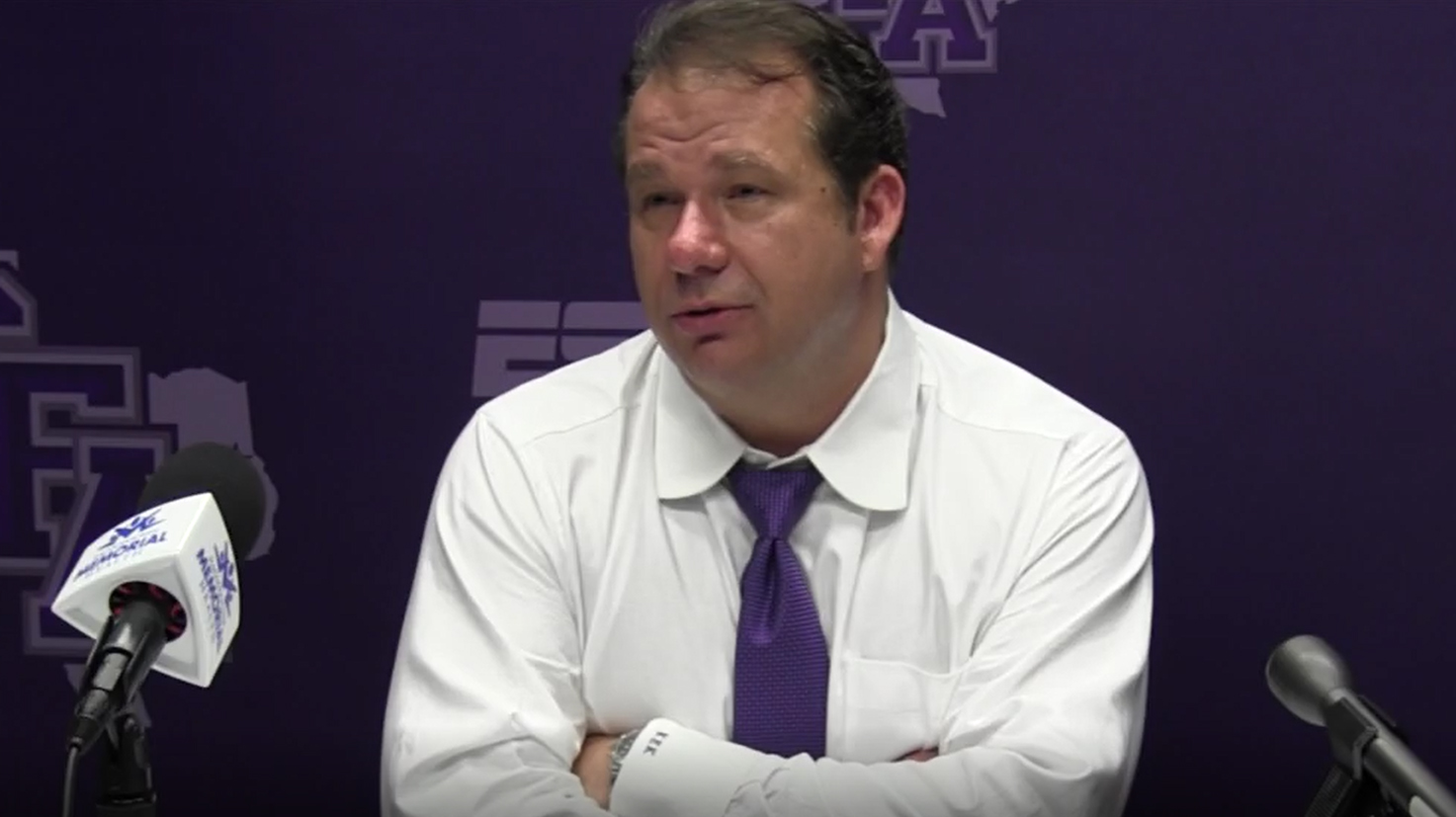
- Keller in 2017

Current position
- Title: Assistant coach
- Team: Texas A&M
- Conference: SEC

Biographical details
- Born: January 16, 1968 (age 58); Dallas, Texas, U.S.
- Education: Oklahoma State ('90)

Coaching career (HC unless noted)
- 1990–1994: Louisiana Tech (assistant)
- 1994–1996: Tyler JC (assistant)
- 1996–1997: UTSA (assistant)
- 1997–1999: Tyler JC
- 1999–2008: Oklahoma State (assistant)
- 2008–2011: Kansas (assistant)
- 2011–2016: Texas A&M (assistant)
- 2016–2025: Stephen F. Austin
- 2025–present: Texas A&M (assistant)

Head coaching record
- Overall: 163–84 (.660)
- Tournaments: 0–1 (NCAA Division I); 0–1 (CIT); 0–1 (CBI)

Accomplishments and honors

Championships
- Southland tournament (2018*); Southland regular season (2020); WAC regular season (2022); *Vacated by the NCAA

Kyle Edward Keller (born January 16, 1968) is an American basketball coach who is currently an assistant coach at Texas A&M University. Previously, he served as an assistant coach at Kansas, Oklahoma State, UTSA, and Louisiana Tech, as well as head coach at Tyler Junior College and Stephen F. Austin State University.

== Coaching career ==
Keller started his coaching career as an assistant at Louisiana Tech. After a four-year stint, Keller joined the staff at Tyler Junior College before taking a position as an assistant at UTSA for one season. In 1997, Keller returned to Tyler Junior College and accepted his first head coaching job. Keller joined the staff of head coach Eddie Sutton at Oklahoma State in 1999, where he would remain until 2008. Keller's time in Stillwater was marred by the plane crash that killed 10 players and staffers in early 2001, including Keller's cousin, Nate Fleming, who replaced Keller on the plane during a last-minute switch. Keller's experience and that of Fleming's family in the aftermath of the crash was documented by ESPN's Outside the Lines in 2011. Following the resignation of then-head coach Sean Sutton in 2008, Keller relocated to Kansas where he served as an assistant to Bill Self. After three seasons, Keller became an assistant to Billy Kennedy at Texas A&M.

On April 4, 2016, Keller was hired as the head coach at Stephen F. Austin. He replaced Brad Underwood who left after 3 seasons to become the head coach at Oklahoma State. SFA athletic director Robert Hill said in a statement, "Kyle brings a wealth of experience having worked for great coaches like Eddie Sutton, Bill Self and Billy Kennedy. This experience will fit well to continue our SFA basketball culture of winning championships and making NCAA tournament appearances. He cares deeply for his players and is a wonderful husband and father. We are so happy he has agreed to become a Lumberjack. I look forward to having our fans and students get to know him."

Keller won his first game as a Division I head coach against the Longwood Lancers on November 15, 2016. Keller led Stephen F. Austin to an 18–15 record in his first season. In 2017–18, Stephen F. Austin finished 28–7, won the 2018 Southland tournament as the No. 3 seed, and appeared in the NCAA tournament. Keller reached 100 wins on February 11, 2021, making him the fastest coach at SFA to reach this milestone.

On November 26, 2019, Stephen F. Austin upset No. 1 Duke 85–83 in overtime, giving Duke their first non-conference home loss in 150 games. Stephen F. Austin finished the 2019–20 season with a 28–3 (19–1 Southland) record and the regular season Southland title. However, due to the COVID-19 pandemic, the Southland and NCAA tournaments were cancelled. He also led the team to two other Power 5 victories, 59–58 vs. Baylor and 83–82 over LSU.

Following the discovery of an administrative error in declaring student-athletes eligible, on May 20, 2020, Stephen F. Austin reached an agreement with the NCAA to vacate hundreds of wins across multiple sports from 2013 to 2019, including all 117 men's basketball wins from the 2014–15 to 2018–19 seasons.

In 2021–22, SFA were co-champions in the WAC. Kyle Keller is currently the 19th most winning basketball coach in all the NCAA of coaches that have been a head coach for a minimum of 4 years.

On January 22, 2025, SFASU announced they had parted ways with Keller.

On April 6, 2025, it was announced that Keller would return to Texas A&M University as an assistant under head coach Bucky McMillan.

== Head coaching record ==
Record table
| Season | Team | Overall | Conference | Standing | Postseason |
|---|---|---|---|---|---|
Stephen F. Austin Lumberjacks (Southland Conference) (2016–2021)
| 2016–17 | Stephen F. Austin | 18–15 | 12–6 | T–2nd (vacated) | CIT First Round (vacated) |
| 2017–18 | Stephen F. Austin | 28–7 | 14–4 | 3rd (vacated) | NCAA Division I Round of 64 (vacated) |
| 2018–19 | Stephen F. Austin | 14–16 | 7–11 | T–9th (vacated) | |
| 2019–20 | Stephen F. Austin | 28–3 | 19–1 | 1st | No postseason held |
| 2020–21 | Stephen F. Austin | 16–5 | 12–3 | 4th | Not eligible for Postseason |
Stephen F. Austin Lumberjacks (Western Athletic Conference) (2021–2024)
| 2021–22 | Stephen F. Austin | 22–9 | 14–4 | T–1st | CBI First Round |
| 2022–23 | Stephen F. Austin | 19–13 | 11–7 | T-4th | |
| 2023–24 | Stephen F. Austin | 18–15 | 10–10 | T–6th | |
Stephen F. Austin Lumberjacks (Southland Conference) (2024–2025)
| 2024–25 | Stephen F. Austin | 8–11 | 1–7 | | |
| Stephen F. Austin: | | 171–95 (.643) | 98–49 (.667) | | |
| Total: | | 171–95 (.643) | | | |
National champion Postseason invitational champion Conference regular season champion Conference regular season and conference tournament champion Division regular season champion Division regular season and conference tournament champion Conference tournament champion

== Personal ==
A native of Dallas, Texas, Keller attended Oklahoma State University where he played baseball. He is married to Chaunsea Keller and has two children: Kenzie and Kemper.
