= 2017–18 Lamar Cardinals basketball team =

American college basketball season

2017–18 Lamar Cardinals basketball

CIT, First round
- Conference: Southland Conference
- Record: 19–14 (11–7 Southland)
- Head coach: Tic Price (4th season)
- Assistant coaches: Bobby Kummer; Justin Bailey; Brandon Chappell
- Home arena: Montagne Center

2017–18 Southland Conference men's basketball standings
	Conf.				Overall
Team	W		L	PCT	W		L	PCT
Southeastern Louisiana	15	–	3	.833	22	–	12	.647
Nicholls State	15	–	3	.833	21	–	11	.656
Stephen F. Austin †	14	–	4	.778	28	–	7	.800
Sam Houston State	12	–	6	.667	21	–	15	.583
Lamar	11	–	7	.611	19	–	14	.576
New Orleans	11	–	7	.611	16	–	17	.485
Central Arkansas	10	–	8	.556	18	–	17	.514
Abilene Christian	8	–	10	.444	16	–	16	.500
Texas A&M–CC	8	–	10	.444	11	–	18	.379
McNeese State	8	–	10	.444	11	–	17	.393
Incarnate Word	2	–	16	.111	7	–	21	.250
Houston Baptist	2	–	16	.111	6	–	25	.194
Northwestern State	1	–	17	.056	4	–	25	.138
† 2018 Southland tournament winner

The 2017–18 Lamar Cardinals basketball team represented Lamar University during the 2017–18 NCAA Division I men's basketball season. The Cardinals were led by fourth-year head coach Tic Price and played their home games at the Montagne Center in Beaumont, Texas as members of the Southland Conference. They finished the season 19–14, 11–7 in Southland play to finish in a tie for fifth place. They lost in the first round of the Southland tournament to Central Arkansas. They were invited to the CollegeInsider.com Tournament where they lost in the first round to UTSA.

== Previous season ==
The Cardinals finished the 2016–17 season 19–15, 10–8 in Southland play to finish in a tie for fifth place. They defeated Southeastern Louisiana in the first round of the Southland tournament to advance to the quarterfinals where they lost to Stephen F. Austin. They were invited to the CollegeInsider.com Tournament where they lost in the first round to Texas State.

== Roster ==
2017–18 Lamar Cardinals men's basketball team
Players
Coaches

Pos.	#	Name	Height	Weight	Year	Hometown
F	1	James Harrison	6 ft 5 in (1.96 m)	200 lb (91 kg)	Sr	Houston, Texas
G	3	Nick Garth	6 ft 0 in (1.83 m)	191 lb (87 kg)	Jr	Houston, Texas
F/C	5	Avery Sullivan	6 ft 8 in (2.03 m)	220 lb (100 kg)	Fr	Pflugerville, Texas
G	10	Torey Noel	5 ft 10 in (1.78 m)	190 lb (86 kg)	Sr	Midwest City, Oklahoma
F	11	Josh Nzeakor	6 ft 8 in (2.03 m)	225 lb (102 kg)	Jr	Mesquite, Texas
G	12	Zjori Bosha	6 ft 5 in (1.96 m)	177 lb (80 kg)	Sr	Nome, Texas
G/F	15	T. J. Atwood	6 ft 6 in (1.98 m)	203 lb (92 kg)	So	Beaumont, Texas
G	20	Da'Shawn Robinson	6 ft 3 in (1.91 m)	210 lb (95 kg)	Sr	Houston, Texas
F	21	Colton Weisbrod	6 ft 5 in (1.96 m)	218 lb (99 kg)	Sr	Nederland, Texas
C	23	Jordan Foster	6 ft 9 in (2.06 m)	225 lb (102 kg)	Fr	Lafayette, Louisiana
G	25	Cannon Broussard	6 ft 1 in (1.85 m)	170 lb (77 kg)	Fr	Beaumont, Texas
G	32	Joey Frenchwood	6 ft 1 in (1.85 m)	184 lb (83 kg)	Sr	Newark, California
G		V.J. Holmes	6 ft 4 in (1.93 m)	185 lb (84 kg)	Jr	Jupiter, Florida
G		Jordan Hunter	5 ft 11 in (1.8 m)	180 lb (82 kg)	Jr	Beaumont, Texas
G		Mike Kolawole	6 ft 5 in (1.96 m)	195 lb (88 kg)	Jr	Rowlett, Texas
G		Laquarious Paige	6 ft 3 in (1.91 m)	180 lb (82 kg)	Jr	West Orange, Texas

Head coach

- Tic Price (Virginia Tech)

Assistant coach(es)

- Bobby Kummer (Charlotte)
- Justin Bailey (UT-Permian Basin)
- Brandon Chappell (Lamar)

Legend

- (C) Team captain
- (S) Suspended
- (I) Ineligible
- (W) Walk-on
- Injured
- Current redshirt

Roster
Last update: January 26, 2018

== Schedule and results ==
Date time, TV	Rank^{#}	Opponent^{#}	Result	Record	Site (attendance) city, state
Non-conference regular season
Nov 10, 2017*; 7:00 pm		Tulsa	W 74–67	1–0	Reynolds Center (7,431); Tulsa, OK
Nov 14, 2017*; 7:00 pm, ESPN3		Coastal Carolina	W 66–60	2–0	Montagne Center (700); Beaumont, TX
Nov 16, 2017*; 7:30 pm, ESPN3		Jarvis Christian	W 103–66	3–0	Montagne Center (1,350); Beaumont, TX
Nov 19, 2017*; 3:00 pm, ESPN3		Cal State Bakersfield	L 73–85	3–1	Montagne Center (1,500); Beaumont, TX
Nov 22, 2017*; 7:00 pm, ESPN3		Southern-New Orleans	W 105–67	4–1	Montagne Center (1,350); Beaumont, TX
Nov 27, 2017*; 8:00 pm		at UTEP	W 66–52	5–1	Don Haskins Center (5,855); El Paso, TX
Dec 2, 2017*; 6:00 pm		Coastal Carolina	W 69–67 ^{OT}	6–1	HTC Center (1,180); Conway, SC
Dec 5, 2017*; 7:00 pm, ESPN3		St. Thomas	W 60–46	7–1	Montagne Center (1,467); Beaumont, TX
Dec 9, 2017*; 4:30 pm, ESPN3		Howard Payne	W 112–56	8–1	Montagne Center (1,638); Beaumont, TX
Dec 17, 2017*; 3:00 pm, ESPN3		at Southern Illinois; Las Vegas Classic	L 61–71	8–2	SIU Arena (2,136); Carbondale, IL
Dec 19, 2017*; 6:00 pm		at Duquesne; Las Vegas Classic	L 64–65	8–3	Palumbo Center (1,156); Pittsburgh, PA
Dec 22, 2017*; 4:20 pm		vs. UC Davis; Las Vegas Classic semifinals	L 68–77	8–4	Orleans Arena; Paradise, NV
Dec 23, 2017*; 2:00 pm		vs. North Carolina A&T; Las Vegas Classic 3rd place game	L 70–74	8–5	Orleans Arena; Paradise, NV
Southland Conference regular season
Dec 28, 2017; 7:00 pm, ESPN3		Houston Baptist	W 86–68	9–5 (1–0)	Montagne Center (1,800); Beaumont, TX
Dec 30, 2017; 7:30 pm		at Texas A&M–Corpus Christi	W 77–72	10–5 (2–0)	American Bank Center (2,472); Corpus Christi, TX
Jan 3, 2018; 7:00 pm		at New Orleans	L 62–72	10–6 (2–1)	Lakefront Arena (513); New Orleans, LA
Jan 6, 2018; 4:30 pm, ESPN3		Central Arkansas	L 91–100 ^{2OT}	10–7 (2–2)	Montagne Center (1,478); Beaumont, TX
Jan 10, 2018; 7:00 pm, ESPN3		Southeastern Louisiana	L 58–63	10–8 (2–3)	Montagne Center (1,297); Beaumont, TX
Jan 17, 2018; 7:00 pm		at Incarnate Word	W 90–69	11–8 (3–3)	McDermott Convocation Center (735); San Antonio, TX
Jan 20, 2018; 4:30 pm, ESPN3		Sam Houston State	W 84–77 ^{OT}	12–8 (4–3)	Montagne Center (1,500); Beaumont, TX
Jan 24, 2018; 7:00 pm, ESPN3		Nicholls State	L 74–79	12–9 (4–4)	Montagne Center (1,834); Beaumont, TX
Jan 27, 2018; 4:30 pm, ESPN3		McNeese State	W 86–80	13–8 (5–4)	Montagne Center (2,196); Beaumont, TX
Jan 31, 2018; 7:00 pm		at Abilene Christian	W 74–69	13–9 (5–5)	Moody Coliseum (1,131); Abilene, TX
Feb 3, 2018; 4:30 pm, ESPN3		Stephen F. Austin	W 76–54	14–10 (6–5)	Montagne Center (1,743); Beaumont, TX
Feb 7, 2018; 6:30 pm		at Northwestern State	W 79–75	15–10 (7–5)	Prather Coliseum (820); Natchitoches, LA
Feb 10, 2018; 6:15 pm, ESPN3		at Sam Houston State	L 69–71	15–11 (7–6)	Bernard G. Johnson Coliseum (1,166); Huntsville, TX
Feb 14, 2018; 7:00 pm, ESPN3		Incarnate Word	W 85–62	16–11 (8–6)	Montagne Center (1,594); Beaumont, TX
Feb 17, 2018; 4:30 pm, ESPN3		Texas A&M–Corpus Christi	W 79–76	17–11 (9–6)	Montagne Center (1,953); Beaumont, TX
Feb 21, 2018; 7:00 pm		at Houston Baptist	W 87–73	18–11 (10–6)	Sharp Gymnasium (612); Houston, TX
Feb 24, 2018; 6:00 pm, ESPN3		at Stephen F. Austin	W 71–66	19–11 (11–6)	William R. Johnson Coliseum (7,023); Nacogdoches, TX
Mar 3, 2018; 3:30 pm		at McNeese State	L 60–69	19–12 (11–7)	Burton Coliseum (940); Lake Charles, LA
Southland tournament
Mar 7, 2018; 7:30 pm, ESPN3	(6)	vs. (7) Central Arkansas; First round	L 57–67	19–13	Leonard E. Merrell Center (970); Katy, TX
CIT
Mar 14, 2018*; 7:00 pm		at UTSA; First round	L 69–76	19–14	Convocation Center (1,012); San Antonio, TX
*Non-conference game. ^{#}Rankings from AP Poll. (#) Tournament seedings in parentheses. All times are in Central Time.

== See also ==
- 2017–18 Lamar Lady Cardinals basketball team
