= 2016–17 New Orleans Privateers men's basketball team =

American college basketball season

2016–17 New Orleans Privateers men's basketball

Southland regular season and tournament champions

NCAA tournament, First Four
- Conference: Southland Conference
- Record: 20–12 (13–5 Southland)
- Head coach: Mark Slessinger (6th season)
- Assistant coaches: Jody Bailey; Kris Arkenberg; Bill Duany
- Home arena: Lakefront Arena (Capacity: 10,000)

2016–17 Southland Conference men's basketball standings
	Conf.				Overall
Team	W		L	PCT	W		L	PCT
New Orleans †	13	–	5	.722	20	–	12	.625
Texas A&M–CC	12	–	6	.667	24	–	12	.667
Houston Baptist	12	–	6	.667	17	–	14	.548
Stephen F. Austin	12	–	6	.667	18	–	15	.545
Sam Houston State	10	–	8	.556	21	–	13	.618
Lamar	10	–	8	.556	19	–	15	.559
Southeastern Louisiana	9	–	9	.500	16	–	16	.500
Nicholls State	7	–	11	.389	14	–	17	.452
Abilene Christian*	7	–	11	.389	13	–	16	.448
Northwestern State	7	–	11	.389	13	–	16	.448
Incarnate Word*	7	–	11	.389	12	–	17	.414
Central Arkansas	7	–	11	.389	8	–	24	.250
McNeese State	4	–	14	.222	7	–	22	.241
† 2017 Southland tournament winner * Ineligible for postseason during transition to Division I

The 2016–17 New Orleans Privateers men's basketball team represented the University of New Orleans during the 2016–17 NCAA Division I men's basketball season. The Privateers were led by sixth-year head coach Mark Slessinger and played their home games at Lakefront Arena as members of the Southland Conference. They finished the season 20–12, 13–5 in Southland play to win the regular season Southland championship. They defeated Sam Houston State and Texas A&M–Corpus Christi to win the Southland Conference tournament. As a result, they earned the conference's automatic bid to the NCAA tournament where they lost in the First Four to Mount St. Mary's.

== Previous season ==
The Privateers finished the 2015–16 season 10–20, 6–12 to finish in a three-way tie for ninth place Southland play. They lost to Southeastern Louisiana in the first round of the Southland tournament.

== Roster ==
2016–17 New Orleans Privateers men's basketball team
Players
Coaches

Pos.	#	Name	Height	Weight	Year	Previous school	Hometown
G	1	Tevin Broyles	6 ft 4 in (1.93 m)	210 lb (95 kg)	Sr	Gautier HS	Gautier, MS
G	2	Coleman Edwards	6 ft 2 in (1.88 m)	175 lb (79 kg)	So	Fort Bend Clements	Sugar Land, TX
G	3	Nate Frye	6 ft 0 in (1.83 m)	215 lb (98 kg)	Sr	Houma Christian HS	Houma, LA
G	4	Bryson Robinson	6 ft 4 in (1.93 m)	202 lb (92 kg)	Fr	Mesquite HS	Mesquite, TX
G	5	Christavious Gill	5 ft 8 in (1.73 m)	165 lb (75 kg)	Sr	Alexandria HS	Alexandria, LA
F	10	A. J. Cheeseman	6 ft 6 in (1.98 m)	230 lb (104 kg)	Fr	Collins Hill HS	Lawrenceville, GA
G/F	11	Michael Zeno	6 ft 6 in (1.98 m)	230 lb (104 kg)	Jr	Westbrook HS	Beaumont, TX
F	12	Gavin Sabo	6 ft 6 in (1.98 m)	230 lb (104 kg)	Fr	Baytown Christian Academy	Baytown, TX
G	13	Jorge Rosa	6 ft 3 in (1.91 m)	205 lb (93 kg)	Jr	Lee Christian Academy; Indian Hills CC	Orlando, FL
F	14	Erik Thomas	6 ft 5 in (1.96 m)	215 lb (98 kg)	Sr	West Chapel; Baton Rouge CC	Wesley Chapel, FL
F	15	Cameron Reed	6 ft 4 in (1.93 m)	190 lb (86 kg)	So	Eastern	Louisville, KY
F	22	Maker Puou	6 ft 9 in (2.06 m)	228 lb (103 kg)	Jr	Mooseheart HS; Vincennes	Rumbek, South Sudan
G	23	Danny Cohen	6 ft 2 in (1.88 m)	190 lb (86 kg)	So	Natchitoches Central HS	Natchitoches, LA
F	25	Travin Thibodeaux	6 ft 8 in (2.03 m)	242 lb (110 kg)	Jr	Brusly HS	Plaquemine, LA
G	32	Matthew Jiles	5 ft 10 in (1.78 m)	165 lb (75 kg)	Jr	Phoenix	Braithwaite, LA
F	55	Scott Plaisance Jr.	6 ft 9 in (2.06 m)	215 lb (98 kg)	RS So	Country Day; Louisiana	Marrero, LA

Head coach

- Mark Slessinger (Aurora)

Assistant coach(es)

- Jody Bailey (Louisville)
- Kris Arkenberg (Franklin (IN))
- Bill Duany (Indiana)

Legend

- (C) Team captain
- (S) Suspended
- (I) Ineligible
- (W) Walk-on
- Injured
- Current redshirt

Roster
Last update: 2022-08-05

== Schedule and results ==
Date time, TV	Rank^{#}	Opponent^{#}	Result	Record	Site (attendance) city, state
Non-conference regular season
November 11, 2016*; 7:00 pm		LaGrange	W 103–67	1–0	Lakefront Arena (739); New Orleans, LA
November 16, 2016*; 7:00 pm, FSOK+		at Oklahoma State	L 72–117	1–1	Gallagher-Iba Arena (4,992); Stillwater, OK
November 19, 2016*; 3:00 pm, ESPN3		at Tulsa	L 68–77	1–2	Reynolds Center (3,271); Tulsa, OK
November 22, 2016*; 8:00 pm, P12N		at USC	L 54–88	1–3	Galen Center (2,711); Los Angeles, CA
November 25, 2016*; 7:00 pm		Florida College	W 90–63	2–3	Lakefront Arena (413); New Orleans, LA
November 29, 2016*; 7:00 pm, CST		Tulane	W 74–59	3–3	Lakefront Arena (1,308); New Orleans, LA
December 3, 2016*; 5:00 pm, P12N		at Washington State	W 70–54	4–3	Beasley Coliseum (2,617); Pullman, WA
December 11, 2016*; 6:00 pm, BTN		at Northwestern	L 49–83	4–4	Welsh-Ryan Arena (6,635); Evanston, IL
December 17, 2016*; 6:15 pm		Louisiana–Lafayette	L 71–76	4–5	Lakefront Arena (1,411); New Orleans, LA
December 19, 2016*; 8:00 pm		at Utah State	L 66–76	4–6	Smith Spectrum (5,825); Logan, UT
December 21, 2016*; 7:00 pm		Williams Baptist	W 91–74	5–6	Lakefront Arena (311); New Orleans, LA
Southland regular season
December 29, 2016; 7:45 pm		Abilene Christian	W 75–66	6–6 (1–0)	Lakefront Arena (608); New Orleans, LA
December 31, 2016; 6:15 pm		Texas A&M–Corpus Christi	W 73–72 ^{OT}	7–6 (2–0)	Lakefront Arena (517); New Orleans, LA
January 5, 2017; 8:00 pm, ESPN3		at Lamar	W 66–62 ^{OT}	8–6 (3–0)	Montagne Center (2,017); Beaumont, TX
January 7, 2017; 3:00 pm		at Incarnate Word	W 87–72	9–6 (4–0)	McDermott Center (751); San Antonio, TX
January 12, 2017; 7:45 pm		Sam Houston State	L 68–77	9–7 (4–1)	Lakefront Arena (721); New Orleans, LA
January 19, 2017; 7:00 pm		Houston Baptist	W 72–64	10–7 (5–1)	Lakefront Arena (727); New Orleans, LA
January 21, 2017; 4:00 pm		at Central Arkansas	W 81–63	11–7 (6–1)	Farris Center (429); Conway, AR
January 26, 2017; 7:00 pm		McNeese State	W 75–56	12–7 (7–1)	Lakefront Arena (789); New Orleans, LA
January 28, 2017; 6:00 pm		at Stephen F. Austin	L 61–71	12–8 (7–2)	William R. Johnson Coliseum (4,166); Nacogdoches, TX
February 1, 2017; 7:00 pm		at Abilene Christian	L 69–70 ^{OT}	12–9 (7–3)	Moody Coliseum (1,485); Abilene, TX
February 4, 2017; 6:15 pm		Nicholls	W 78–69	13–9 (8–3)	Lakefront Arena (1,782); New Orleans, LA
February 9, 2017; 7:00 pm		at McNeese State	W 69–63	14–9 (9–3)	Burton Coliseum (375); Lake Charles, LA
February 11, 2017; 5:00 pm, ESPN3		at Southeastern Louisiana	W 60–52	15–9 (10–3)	University Center (708); Hammond, LA
February 18, 2017; 4:00 pm		Central Arkansas	W 84–61	16–9 (11–3)	Lakefront Arena (812); New Orleans, LA
February 23, 2017; 7:45 pm		Stephen F. Austin	W 82–65	17–9 (12–3)	Lakefront Arena (1,211); New Orleans, LA
February 25, 2017; 3:00 pm		at Northwestern State	L 82–83	17–10 (12–4)	Prather Coliseum (1,423); Natchitoches, LA
March 2, 2017; 7:45 pm		Southeastern Louisiana	L 58–63	17–11 (12–5)	Lakefront Arena (1,302); New Orleans, LA
March 4, 2017; 3:00 pm		at Nicholls	W 74–64	18–11 (13–5)	Stopher Gym (702); Thibodaux, LA
Southland tournament
March 10, 2017; 5:00 pm, ESPN3	(1)	vs. (5) Sam Houston State; Semifinals	W 75–63	19–11	Merrell Center (2,318); Katy, TX
March 10, 2017; 8:30 pm, ESPN2	(1)	vs. (2) Texas A&M–Corpus Christi; Championship	W 68–65 ^{OT}	20–11	Merrell Center (2,068); Katy, TX
NCAA tournament
March 14, 2017*; 5:40 pm, truTV	(16 E)	vs. (16 E) Mount St. Mary's; First Four	L 66–67	20–12	UD Arena (11,855); Dayton, OH
*Non-conference game. ^{#}Rankings from AP Poll. (#) Tournament seedings in parentheses. E=East Region. All times are in Central Time.

== See also ==
- 2016–17 New Orleans Privateers women's basketball team
