= 2016–17 McNeese State Cowboys basketball team =

American college basketball season

2016–17 McNeese State Cowboys basketball
- Conference: Southland Conference
- Record: 7–22 (4–14 Southland)
- Head coach: Dave Simmons (11th season)
- Assistant coaches: David Dumars; Preston David; Eric Wills
- Home arena: Burton Coliseum (Capacity: 8,000)

2016–17 Southland Conference men's basketball standings
	Conf.				Overall
Team	W		L	PCT	W		L	PCT
New Orleans †	13	–	5	.722	20	–	12	.625
Texas A&M–CC	12	–	6	.667	24	–	12	.667
Houston Baptist	12	–	6	.667	17	–	14	.548
Stephen F. Austin	12	–	6	.667	18	–	15	.545
Sam Houston State	10	–	8	.556	21	–	13	.618
Lamar	10	–	8	.556	19	–	15	.559
Southeastern Louisiana	9	–	9	.500	16	–	16	.500
Nicholls State	7	–	11	.389	14	–	17	.452
Abilene Christian*	7	–	11	.389	13	–	16	.448
Northwestern State	7	–	11	.389	13	–	16	.448
Incarnate Word*	7	–	11	.389	12	–	17	.414
Central Arkansas	7	–	11	.389	8	–	24	.250
McNeese State	4	–	14	.222	7	–	22	.241
† 2017 Southland tournament winner * Ineligible for postseason during transition to Division I

The 2016–17 McNeese State Cowboys basketball team represented McNeese State University during the 2016–17 NCAA Division I men's basketball season. The Cowboys were led by 11th-year head coach Dave Simmons and played their home games at Burton Coliseum in Lake Charles, Louisiana as members of the Southland Conference. They finished the season 7–22, 4–14 in Southland play to finish in last place. They failed to qualify for the Southland tournament.

== Previous season ==
The Cowboys finished the 2015–16 season with a record of 8–21, 6–12 in Southland play to finish in eighth place. They lost to Nicholls State in the first round of the Southland tournament.

== Roster ==
2016–17 McNeese State Cowboys men's basketball team
Players
Coaches

Pos.	#	Name	Height	Weight	Year	Previous school	Hometown
G	1	Jamaya Burr	6 ft 0 in (1.83 m)	175 lb (79 kg)	Sr	Ruston HS	Ruston, LA
G	2	James Harvey	6 ft 2 in (1.88 m)	170 lb (77 kg)	So	Amite HS	Amite, LA
F	3	Richard Laku	6 ft 8 in (2.03 m)	190 lb (86 kg)	RS Fr	Sachse HS	Dallas, TX
F	5	Fred Haywood	6 ft 5 in (1.96 m)	190 lb (86 kg)	Fr	John F. Kennedy HS	Mound Bayou, MS
G	10	Jarren Greenwood	6 ft 2 in (1.88 m)	175 lb (79 kg)	So	Bellaire HS	Houston, TX
G	11	Kalob Ledoux	6 ft 3 in (1.91 m)	215 lb (98 kg)	Fr	Lafayette Christian Academy	Port Barre, LA
F	13	Jacob Bonnington	6 ft 10 in (2.08 m)	215 lb (98 kg)	Fr	Clements HS	Sugar Land, TX
F	14	Howard Thomas	6 ft 7 in (2.01 m)	258 lb (117 kg)	Jr	Brandon HS; Itawamba CC	Brandon, MS
G	15	Labarrius Hill	6 ft 8 in (2.03 m)	210 lb (95 kg)	Jr	Parrish HS; Itawamba CC	Parrish, AL
G	20	Kelvin Henry Jr.	6 ft 0 in (1.83 m)	175 lb (79 kg)	Fr	St. Louis Catholic HS	Lake Charles, LA
G	23	Jacob Ledoux	6 ft 3 in (1.91 m)	210 lb (95 kg)	Fr	Lafayette Christian Academy	Port Barre, LA
G/F	24	Lance Potier	6 ft 6 in (1.98 m)	200 lb (91 kg)	Sr	St. Martinville HS	St. Martinville, LA
F	30	Adrian Brown	6 ft 7 in (2.01 m)	210 lb (95 kg)	So	Northshore HS	Houston, TX
F	31	Stephen Ugochukwu	6 ft 7 in (2.01 m)	220 lb (100 kg)	Jr	Argyle Liberty Christian	Lewisville, TX

Head coach

- Dave Simmons

Assistant coach(es)

- David Dumars
- Preston David
- Eric Willis

Legend

- (C) Team captain
- (S) Suspended
- (I) Ineligible
- (W) Walk-on
- Injured
- Current redshirt

Roster
Last update: 2016-09-24

== Schedule and results ==
Date time, TV	Opponent	Result	Record	Site (attendance) city, state
Non-conference regular season
November 11, 2016*; 6:00 pm	at No. 15 Purdue	L 65-109	0-1	Mackey Arena (13,523); West Lafayette, IN
November 15, 2016*; 7:00 pm	Louisiana College	L 75-85	0-2	Burton Coliseum (323); Lake Charles, LA
November 20, 2016*; 7:00 pm	Southerns-New Orleans	W 96-73	1-2	Burton Coliseum (597); Lake Charles, LA
November 22, 2016*; 6:00 pm	at Memphis	L 65-104	1-3	FedExForum (8,941); Memphis, TN
November 26, 2016*; 1:00 pm	LSU–Alexandria	W 80–78	2–3	Burton Coliseum (588); Lake Charles, LA
November 29, 2016*; 7:00 pm	at Texas State	L 68–80	2–4	Strahan Coliseum (1,590); San Marcos, TX
December 3, 2016*; 1:00 pm	Louisiana–Lafayette	L 72–92	2–5	Burton Coliseum (1,500); Lake Charles, LA
December 14, 2016*; 7:00 pm, ESPN3	at SMU	L 56–92	2–6	Moody Coliseum (6,498); Dallas, TX
December 17, 2016*; 3:00 pm	North Carolina Central	L 66–74	2–7	Burton Coliseum (597); Lake Charles, LA
December 19, 2016*; 7:00 pm, ESPN3	at Tulane	W 70–63	3–7	Devlin Fieldhouse (1,029); New Orleans, LA
December 22, 2016*; 7:00 pm	at North Carolina State	W 89–57	3–8	PNC Arena (15,186); Raleigh, NC
Southland regular season
December 31, 2016; 3:00 pm	at Northwestern State	W 79–72 ^{OT}	4–8 (1–0)	Prather Coliseum (1,472); Natchitoches, LA
January 2, 2017; 7:30 pm, ESPN3	at Stephen F. Austin	W 69–54	5–8 (2–0)	William R. Johnson Coliseum (531); Nacogdoches, TX
January 5, 2017; 7:30 pm	Sam Houston State	L 67–74	5–9 (2–1)	Burton Coliseum (722); Lake Charles, LA
January 7, 2017; 1:00 pm	at Houston Baptist	L 49–60	5–10 (2–2)	Sharp Gym (694); Houston, TX
January 15, 2017; 3:00 pm	at Southeastern Louisiana	L 75–79	5–11 (2–3)	University Center (1,353); Hammond, LA
January 18, 2017; 7:00 pm	Central Arkansas	W 82–72	6–11 (3–3)	Burton Coliseum (307); Lake Charles, LA
January 21, 2017; 3:00 pm	Northwestern State	L 65–78	6–12 (3–4)	Burton Coliseum (1,022); Lake Charles, LA
January 26, 2017; 7:00 pm	at New Orleans	L 56–75	6–13 (3–5)	Lakefront Arena (789); New Orleans, LA
January 28, 2017; 6:30 pm	at Nicholls	L 74–78	6–14 (3–6)	Stopher Gym (609); Thibodaux, LA
February 2, 2017; 7:30 pm	at Incarnate Word	W 87–77	7–14 (4–6)	McDermott Center (2,000); San Antonio, TX
February 4, 2017; 4:00 pm, ESPN3	at Lamar	L 57–77	7–15 (4–7)	Montagne Center (2,774); Beaumont, TX
February 9, 2017; 7:00 pm	New Orleans	L 63–69	7–16 (4–8)	Burton Coliseum (375); Lake Charles, LA
February 11, 2017; 3:00 pm	Texas A&M–Corpus Christi	L 66–73	7–17 (4–9)	Burton Coliseum (833); Lake Charles, LA
February 16, 2017; 7:00 pm	Abilene Christian	L 78–82	7–18 (4–10)	Burton Coliseum (434); Lake Charles, LA
February 23, 2017; 7:00 pm	Houston Baptist	L 79–81	7–19 (4–11)	Burton Coliseum (479); Lake Charles, LA
February 25, 2017; 1:30 pm	at Texas A&M–Corpus Christi	L 70–81	7–20 (4–12)	American Bank Center (1,462); Corpus Christi, TX
March 2, 2017; 7:15 pm	at Sam Houston State	L 74–79	7–21 (4–13)	Bernard Johnson Coliseum (1,253); Huntsville, TX
March 4, 2017; 3:00 pm	Lamar	L 83–90	7–22 (4–14)	Burton Coliseum (400); Lake Charles, LA
*Non-conference game. ^{#}Rankings from AP Poll. (#) Tournament seedings in parentheses. All times are in Central Time.

== See also ==
- 2016–17 McNeese State Cowgirls basketball team
