= 2016–17 Northwestern State Demons basketball team =

American college basketball season

2016–17 Northwestern State Demons basketball
- Conference: Southland Conference
- Record: 13–16 (7–11 Southland)
- Head coach: Mike McConathy (18th season)
- Assistant coaches: Jeff Moore; Bill Lewit; Jacob Spielbauer
- Home arena: Prather Coliseum (Capacity: 3,900)

2016–17 Southland Conference men's basketball standings
	Conf.				Overall
Team	W		L	PCT	W		L	PCT
New Orleans †	13	–	5	.722	20	–	12	.625
Texas A&M–CC	12	–	6	.667	24	–	12	.667
Houston Baptist	12	–	6	.667	17	–	14	.548
Stephen F. Austin	12	–	6	.667	18	–	15	.545
Sam Houston State	10	–	8	.556	21	–	13	.618
Lamar	10	–	8	.556	19	–	15	.559
Southeastern Louisiana	9	–	9	.500	16	–	16	.500
Nicholls State	7	–	11	.389	14	–	17	.452
Abilene Christian*	7	–	11	.389	13	–	16	.448
Northwestern State	7	–	11	.389	13	–	16	.448
Incarnate Word*	7	–	11	.389	12	–	17	.414
Central Arkansas	7	–	11	.389	8	–	24	.250
McNeese State	4	–	14	.222	7	–	22	.241
† 2017 Southland tournament winner * Ineligible for postseason during transition to Division I

The 2016–17 Northwestern State Demons basketball team represented Northwestern State University during the 2016–17 NCAA Division I men's basketball season. The Demons, led by 18th-year head coach Mike McConathy, played their home games at Prather Coliseum in Natchitoches, Louisiana as members of the Southland Conference. They finished the season 13–16, 7–11 in Southland play to finish in a five-way tie for eighth place. They failed to qualify for the Southland tournament.

== Previous season ==
The Demons finished the 2015–16 season with a record of 8–20, 5–13 in Southland play to finish in 12th place. As a result, they failed to qualify for the Southland tournament

== Roster ==
2016–17 Northwestern State Demons men's basketball team
Players
Coaches

Pos.	#	Name	Height	Weight	Year	Previous school	Hometown
G	0	Tra'von Joseph	6 ft 5 in (1.96 m)	200 lb (91 kg)	Jr	North Central HS	Morrow, LA
G	2	Ta'Jon Welcome	6 ft 3 in (1.91 m)	175 lb (79 kg)	Sr	Booker T. Washington HS; Tyler JC	Houston, TX
G	3	Devonte Hall	6 ft 1 in (1.85 m)	185 lb (84 kg)	So	Bossier HS	Bossier City, LA
G/F	10	Reginald Kissoonial	6 ft 11 in (2.11 m)	195 lb (88 kg)	So	William M. Raines HS	Jacksonville, FL
G	11	Paxson Guest	6 ft 5 in (1.96 m)	200 lb (91 kg)	Sr	Airline HS	Bossier City, LA
G	12	Jalan West	5 ft 10 in (1.78 m)	175 lb (79 kg)	Sr	Bossier HS	Bossier City, LA
F	13	Matt Killian	6 ft 5 in (1.96 m)	180 lb (82 kg)	Sr	Hornbeck HS	Hornbeck, LA
G	21	Sabri Thompson	6 ft 3 in (1.91 m)	190 lb (86 kg)	Jr	Sanford HS	Newark, DE
G	22	Tony Dobbinson	5 ft 10 in (1.78 m)	175 lb (79 kg)	Sr	Westhill HS; McCook CC	Stamford, CT
G	23	Zeek Woodley	6 ft 2 in (1.88 m)	200 lb (91 kg)	Jr	Pelican All-Saints HS	Pelican, LA
F	42	Deji Adekunle	6 ft 11 in (2.11 m)	230 lb (104 kg)	Sr	Woodside HS; Williston State College	London, England
G	44	Peyton Prudhomme	6 ft 4 in (1.93 m)	195 lb (88 kg)	So	Westwind Preparatory Academy	Newport Beach, CA

Head coach

- Mike McConathy

Assistant coach(es)

- Jeff Moore
- Bill Lewit
- Jacob Spielbauer

Legend

- (C) Team captain
- (S) Suspended
- (I) Ineligible
- (W) Walk-on
- Injured
- Current redshirt

Roster
Last update: September 25, 2016

== Radio ==
Most games will be carried live on the Demon Sports Radio Network. There are three affiliates for the Demon Sports Radio Network.

- KZBL (Flagship)
- KSYR
- KTEZ

== Schedule and results ==
Date time, TV	Opponent	Result	Record	Site (attendance) city, state
Non-conference regular season
November 11, 2016*; 8:00 pm, SECN	at Texas A&M	L 44–72	0–1	Reed Arena (7,539); College Station, TX
November 13, 2016*; 4:00 pm	at Oklahoma	L 61–97	0–2	Lloyd Noble Center (8,456); Norman, OK
November 18, 2016*; 12:00 pm	LeTourneau	W 92–87	1–2	Prather Coliseum (1,701); Natchitoches, LA
November 22, 2016*; 6:30 pm	LSU–Alexandria	W 82–69	2–2	Prather Coliseum (1,202); Natchitoches, LA
November 26, 2016*; 2:00 pm	at Missouri	L 60–84	2–3	Mizzou Arena (4,669); Columbia, MO
November 28, 2016*; 7:00 pm, SECN	at Mississippi State	L 59–65	2–4	Humphrey Coliseum (6,070); Starkville, MS
December 1, 2016*; 6:30 pm	LSU–Shreveport	W 88–74	3–4	Prather Coliseum (1,415); Natchitoches, LA
December 3, 2016*; 8:00 pm	at UTEP	W 79–67	4–4	Don Haskins Center (5,928); El Paso, TX
December 17, 2016*; 4:30 pm	vs. Louisiana–Monroe	W 68–64	5–4	CenturyLink Center (737); Bossier City, LA
December 19, 2016*; 7:00 pm	at Rice	L 93–100	5–5	Tudor Fieldhouse (1,555); Houston, TX
December 28, 2016*; 6:30 pm	Louisiana College	W 86–66	6–5	Prather Coliseum (877); Natchitoches, LA
Southland Conference regular season
December 31, 2016; 3:00 pm	McNeese State	L 72–79 ^{OT}	6–6 (0–1)	Prather Coliseum (1,472); Natchitoches, LA
January 5, 2017; 7:30 pm	at Incarnate Word	L 80–84	6–7 (0–2)	McDermott Center (698); San Antonio, TX
January 7, 2017; 7:00 pm	at Texas A&M–Corpus Christi	L 82–99	6–8 (0–3)	American Bank Center (1,172); Corpus Christi, TX
January 12, 2017; 7:00 pm	Nicholls	W 86–81	6–9 (1–3)	Prather Coliseum (1,121); Natchitoches, LA
January 14, 2017; 3:00 pm	Sam Houston State	L 68–77	7–9 (1–4)	Prather Coliseum (1,316); Natchitoches, LA
January 21, 2017; 3:00 pm	at McNeese State	W 78–65	8–9 (2–4)	Burton Coliseum (1,022); Lake Charles, LA
January 25, 2017; 7:30 pm	at Southeastern Louisiana	W 85–71	9–9 (3–4)	University Center (1,241); Hammond, LA
January 28, 2017; 4:30 pm, ESPN3	at Lamar	L 64–85	9–10 (3–5)	Montagne Center (2,109); Beaumont, TX
February 2, 2017; 7:00 pm	at Central Arkansas	L 97–107	9–11 (3–6)	Farris Center (754); Conway, AR
February 4, 2017; 3:30 pm	Stephen F. Austin	L 73–75 ^{OT}	9–12 (3–7)	Prather Coliseum (2,303); Natchitoches, LA
February 9, 2017; 7:30 pm	Houston Baptist	L 69–86	9–13 (3–8)	Prather Coliseum (1,522); Natchitoches, LA
February 11, 2017; 4:00 pm	at Abilene Christian	L 72–76	9–14 (3–9)	Moody Coliseum (1,271); Abilene, TX
February 16, 2017; 8:00 pm	Southeastern Louisiana	L 66–73	9–15 (3–10)	Prather Coliseum (1,711); Natchitoches, LA
February 18, 2017; 7:00 pm	at Nicholls	W 80–78	10–15 (4–10)	Stopher Gym (509); Thibodaux, LA
February 22, 2017; 8:00 pm	Lamar	L 68–88	10–16 (4–11)	Prather Coliseum (1,323); Natchitoches, LA
February 25, 2017; 3:00 pm	New Orleans	W 83–82	11–16 (5–11)	Prather Coliseum (1,423); Natchitoches, LA
March 2, 2017; 8:00 pm, ESPN3	at Stephen F. Austin	W 72–67	12–16 (6–11)	William R. Johnson Coliseum (6,207); Nacogdoches, TX
03/04/2017; 3:00 pm	Central Arkansas	W 97–83	13–16 (7–11)	Prather Coliseum (1,523); Natchitoches, LA
*Non-conference game. ^{#}Rankings from AP Poll. (#) Tournament seedings in parentheses. All times are in Central Time.

== See also ==
- 2016–17 Northwestern State Lady Demons basketball team
