= 2016–17 Nicholls State Colonels men's basketball team =

American college basketball season

2016–17 Nicholls State Colonels men's basketball
- Conference: Southland Conference
- Record: 14–17 (7–11 Southland)
- Head coach: Richie Riley (1st season)
- Assistant coaches: John Aiken; Marlon Terry; Austin Claunch
- Home arena: Stopher Gym (Capacity: 3,800)

2016–17 Southland Conference men's basketball standings
	Conf.				Overall
Team	W		L	PCT	W		L	PCT
New Orleans †	13	–	5	.722	20	–	12	.625
Texas A&M–CC	12	–	6	.667	24	–	12	.667
Houston Baptist	12	–	6	.667	17	–	14	.548
Stephen F. Austin	12	–	6	.667	18	–	15	.545
Sam Houston State	10	–	8	.556	21	–	13	.618
Lamar	10	–	8	.556	19	–	15	.559
Southeastern Louisiana	9	–	9	.500	16	–	16	.500
Nicholls State	7	–	11	.389	14	–	17	.452
Abilene Christian*	7	–	11	.389	13	–	16	.448
Northwestern State	7	–	11	.389	13	–	16	.448
Incarnate Word*	7	–	11	.389	12	–	17	.414
Central Arkansas	7	–	11	.389	8	–	24	.250
McNeese State	4	–	14	.222	7	–	22	.241
† 2017 Southland tournament winner * Ineligible for postseason during transition to Division I

The 2016–17 Nicholls State Colonels men's basketball team represented Nicholls State University during the 2016–17 NCAA Division I men's basketball season. The Colonels, led by first-year head coach Richie Riley, played their home games at Stopher Gym in Thibodaux, Louisiana as members of the Southland Conference. They finished the season 14–17, 7–11 in Southland play to finish in a five-way tie for eighth place. They failed to qualify for the Southland tournament. Senior forward Liam Thomas led Division I in blocks per game with a 4.19 average.

== Previous season ==
The Colonels finished the 2015–16 season with a record of 11–23, 6–12 in Southland play to finish in a three-way tie for ninth place. They defeated McNeese State in the first round of the Southland tournament to advance to the quarterfinals where they lost to Sam Houston State.

On March 29, 2016, head coach J. P. Piper was fired. He finished at Nicholls State with a 12-year record of 132–224. On April 27, the school announced that Richie Riley had been hired as head coach.

== Offseason ==
Coach Riley announced his assistant coaches on June 6, 2016. The new assistant coaches were John Aiken, Marlon Terry, and Austin Claunch.

== Roster ==
2016–17 Nicholls State Colonels men's basketball team
Players
Coaches

Pos.	#	Name	Height	Weight	Year	Previous school	Hometown
G	1	Marquis Nelson	6 ft 0 in (1.83 m)	185 lb (84 kg)	So	Helen Cox HS	New Orleans, LA
C	2	Kyle Caudill	7 ft 0 in (2.13 m)	209 lb (95 kg)	GS	Boston College	Brea, CA
G	4	Cameron Burke	6 ft 4 in (1.93 m)	185 lb (84 kg)	Fr	Dutchtown HS	Dutchtown, LA
G	5	Tre O'neal	6 ft 1 in (1.85 m)	190 lb (86 kg)	Jr	Otero JC	Denver, CO
G	10	Zach Young	6 ft 1 in (1.85 m)	195 lb (88 kg)	So	Impact Academy	Wellington, New Zealand
F	11	Adam Ward	6 ft 5 in (1.96 m)	210 lb (95 kg)	Jr	Lee College	Houston, TX
G	12	Jaden Weldon	6 ft 1 in (1.85 m)	165 lb (75 kg)	Fr	Trinity Grammar School	Sydney, Australia
G	13	Jonathan Bell	6 ft 2 in (1.88 m)	170 lb (77 kg)	RS Jr	Garden City CC	Los Angeles, CA
F	14	Ja'Dante' Frye	6 ft 4 in (1.93 m)	190 lb (86 kg)	RS Jr	E.D. White HS	Thibodaux, LA
F	15	Sam McBeath	6 ft 7 in (2.01 m)	210 lb (95 kg)	RS Sr	Cambelltown HS	Sydney, Australia
F	20	Brett Weaver	5 ft 10 in (1.78 m)	185 lb (84 kg)	So	Ottawa	Canyon, TX
G	21	Shane Rillieux	6 ft 0 in (1.83 m)	180 lb (82 kg)	RS Sr	Brother Martin HS	New Orleans, LA
G	22	T. J. Carpenter	6 ft 4 in (1.93 m)	200 lb (91 kg)	Sr	Lakeside HS	Sibley, LA
G	23	Quinton Thomas	6 ft 2 in (1.88 m)	175 lb (79 kg)		Dunham HS	Baton Rouge, LA
F	24	Liam Thomas	7 ft 0 in (2.13 m)	200 lb (91 kg)	Sr	Central Private School	Sydney, Australia
	30	Robert Bissant	5 ft 10 in (1.78 m)	160 lb (73 kg)	So	Delago CC	New Orleans, LA
G	32	Davon Spencer	6 ft 5 in (1.96 m)	170 lb (77 kg)	So	Delago CC	New Orleans, LA
G	40	Stevie Repichowski	6 ft 5 in (1.96 m)	195 lb (88 kg)	Jr	Tulsa	Lansing, MI
F	44	Luka Kamber	6 ft 8 in (2.03 m)	215 lb (98 kg)	Jr	Louisiana-Lafayette	Berlin, Germany

Head coach

- Richie Riley

Assistant coach(es)

- John Aiken
- Marlon Terry
- Austin Claunch

Legend

- (C) Team captain
- (S) Suspended
- (I) Ineligible
- (W) Walk-on
- Injured
- Current redshirt

[ Roster]
Last update: September 29, 2016

== Schedule and results ==
Date time, TV	Opponent	Result	Record	Site (attendance) city, state
Non-conference regular season
November 11, 2016*; 6:00 p.m.	at Boston College	W 79–73	1–0	Conte Forum (3,122); Chestnut Hill, MA
November 14*; 6:00 p.m., ESPN3	at UCF	L 56–80	1–1	CFE Arena (5,274); Orlando, FL
November 17*; 6:00 p.m.	at Mississippi College	W 86–55	2–1	Stopher Gym (847); Thibodaux, LA
November 20*; 4:00 p.m.	at San Diego; San Diego Classic	L 72–81	2–2	Jenny Craig Pavilion (849); San Diego, CA
November 22*; 8:00 p.m.	at New Mexico State; San Diego Classic	L 74–86	2–3	Pan American Center (3,301); Las Cruces, NM
November 25*; 2:00 p.m.	vs. Bethune–Cookman; San Diego Classic	W 76–69	3–3	Pete Hanna Center (167); Birmingham, AL
November 27*; 3:00 p.m.	at Samford; San Diego Classic	W 106–103 ^{2OT}	4–3	Pete Hanna Center (802); Birmingham, AL
December 1*; 7:15 pm	at Louisiana–Lafayette	L 69–101	4–4	CajunDome (4,982); Lafayette, LA
December 8*; 8:00 p.m.	at Florida State	L 63–118	4–5	Donald L. Tucker Civic Center (4,807); Tallahassee, FL
December 11*; 4:00 p.m.	Thomas (GA)	W 95–63	5–5	Stopher Gym (344); Thibodaux, LA
December 14*; 8:00 p.m.	at Texas Tech	L 46–89	6–5	United Supermarkets Arena (7,019); Lubbock, TX
December 18*; 8:00 p.m.	Mobile	W 83–66	6–6	Stopher Gym (368); Thibodaux, LA
December 28*; 6:30 pm	Spring Hill	W 88–64	7–6	Stopher Gym (433); Thibodaux, LA
Southland Conference regular season
December 31, 2016; 3:00 pm	Incarnate Word	W 94–84	8–6 (1–0)	Stopher Gym (501); Thibodaux, LA
January 2, 2017; 8:00 pm	Texas A&M–Corpus Christi	W 68–64	9–6 (2–0)	Stopher Gym (404); Thibodaux, LA
January 7; 6:15 p.m.	at Sam Houston State	L 61–74	9–7 (2–1)	Bernard Johnson Coliseum (678); Huntsville, TX
January 12; 7:00 p.m.	at Northwestern State	L 81–86	9–8 (2–2)	Prather Coliseum (1,121); Natchitoches, LA
January 14; 4:00 p.m.	Stephen F. Austin	L 60–80	9–9 (2–3)	William R. Johnson Coliseum (2,273); Nacogdoches, TX
January 19; 6:30 pm	Abilene Christian	W 62–59	10–9 (3–3)	Moody Coliseum (1,468); Abilene, TX
January 21; 3:30 pm	Lamar	L 76–87	10–10 (3–4)	Stopher Gym (533); Thibodaux, LA
January 26; 7:00 p.m.	at Houston Baptist	L 80–83	10–11 (3–5)	Sharp Gym (783); Houston, TX
January 28; 6:30 pm	McNeese State	W 78–74	11–11 (4–5)	Stopher Gym (609); Thibodaux, LA
February 1; 7:30 p.m.	at Southeastern Louisiana	L 44–72	11–12 (4–6)	University Center (1,125); Hammond, LA
February 4; 6:15 p.m.	at New Orleans	L 69–78	11–13 (4–7)	Lakefront Arena (1,782); New Orleans, LA
February 11; 4:00 p.m.	at Central Arkansas	L 83–106	11–14 (4–8)	Farris Center (1,845); Conway, AR
February 16; 6:30 pm	Central Arkansas	W 96–89 ^{OT}	12–14 (5–8)	Stopher Gym (601); Thibodaux, LA
February 18; 7:00 pm	Northwestern State	L 78–80	12–15 (5–9)	Stopher Gym (509); Thibodaux, LA
February 23; 7:00 p.m.	at Incarnate Word	W 77–68	13–15 (6–9)	McDermott Center (1,743); San Antonio, TX
February 25; 8:00 p.m.	Southeastern Louisiana	W 77–71	14–15 (7–9)	Stopher Gym (338); Thibodaux, LA
March 2; 7:00 p.m., ESPN3	at Lamar	L 75–87	14–16 (7–10)	Montagne Center (2,278); Beaumont, TX
March 4; 3:00 pm	New Orleans	L 64–74	14–17 (7–11)	Stopher Gym (702); Thibodaux, LA
*Non-conference game. ^{#}Rankings from AP Poll. (#) Tournament seedings in parentheses. All times are in Central Time.
