= 2016–17 Incarnate Word Cardinals men's basketball team =

American college basketball season

2016–17 Incarnate Word Cardinals men's basketball
- Conference: Southland Conference
- Record: 12–17 (7–11 Southland)
- Head coach: Ken Burmeister (11th season)
- Assistant coaches: Brian Curtis; John Smith; Johnny Brown
- Home arena: McDermott Convocation Center (Capacity: 2,000)

2016–17 Southland Conference men's basketball standings
| | Conf. | | | | Overall |
| Team | W | | L | PCT | W | | L | PCT |
|---|---|---|---|---|---|---|---|---|
| New Orleans † | 13 | – | 5 | .722 | 20 | – | 12 | .625 |
| Texas A&M–CC | 12 | – | 6 | .667 | 24 | – | 12 | .667 |
| Houston Baptist | 12 | – | 6 | .667 | 17 | – | 14 | .548 |
| Stephen F. Austin | 12 | – | 6 | .667 | 18 | – | 15 | .545 |
| Sam Houston State | 10 | – | 8 | .556 | 21 | – | 13 | .618 |
| Lamar | 10 | – | 8 | .556 | 19 | – | 15 | .559 |
| Southeastern Louisiana | 9 | – | 9 | .500 | 16 | – | 16 | .500 |
| Nicholls State | 7 | – | 11 | .389 | 14 | – | 17 | .452 |
| Abilene Christian* | 7 | – | 11 | .389 | 13 | – | 16 | .448 |
| Northwestern State | 7 | – | 11 | .389 | 13 | – | 16 | .448 |
| Incarnate Word* | 7 | – | 11 | .389 | 12 | – | 17 | .414 |
| Central Arkansas | 7 | – | 11 | .389 | 8 | – | 24 | .250 |
| McNeese State | 4 | – | 14 | .222 | 7 | – | 22 | .241 |
† 2017 Southland tournament winner * Ineligible for postseason during transition to Division I

The 2016–17 Incarnate Word Cardinals men's basketball team represented the University of the Incarnate Word during the 2016–17 NCAA Division I men's basketball season. The Cardinals were led by 11th-year head coach Ken Burmeister and played their home games at McDermott Convocation Center in San Antonio, Texas as members of the Southland Conference. They finished the season 12–17, 7–11 in Southland play to finish in a five-way tie for eighth place.

The 2016–17 season was the final year of a four-year transitional period for Incarnate Word from Division II to Division I. During year four, the Cardinals played a normal conference schedule. They were Division I for scheduling purposes and were also considered as a Division I RPI member. They could not participate in the conference tournament until the 2017–18 season at which time they will also be able to participate in the NCAA tournament.

== Previous season ==
The Cardinals finished the 2015–16 season 16–12, 11–6 in Southland play to finish in a tie for third place.

== Roster ==
2016–17 Incarnate Word Cardinals men's basketball team
Players
Coaches

| Pos. | # | Name | Height | Weight | Year | Previous school | Hometown |
|---|---|---|---|---|---|---|---|
| PF | 00 | Myles Thornton | 6 ft 6 in (1.98 m) | 190 lb (86 kg) | So | Smithson Valley | Selma, TX |
| PG | 1 | Jalin Hart | 5 ft 11 in (1.8 m) | 150 lb (68 kg) | Jr | North Shore; New Mexico Junior College | Houston, TX |
| G | 2 | Evan Beucler | 6 ft 5 in (1.96 m) | 205 lb (93 kg) | So | Highland Park; Kansas State | Dallas, TX |
| F | 3 | Simi Socks | 6 ft 6 in (1.98 m) | 210 lb (95 kg) | So | Coppell; Bridgton Academy | Coppell, TX |
| G | 4 | Christian Peevy | 6 ft 6 in (1.98 m) | 185 lb (84 kg) | Fr | Mount Carmel | Chicago, IL |
| PF | 5 | Devin Wyatt | 6 ft 8 in (2.03 m) | 195 lb (88 kg) | Jr | DeSoto; Loyola Marymount | Desoto, TX |
| PG | 10 | Tyler Singleton | 6 ft 3 in (1.91 m) | 175 lb (79 kg) | So | Triple A Academy | Dallas, TX |
| C | 12 | Miles Banks | 6 ft 9 in (2.06 m) | 250 lb (113 kg) | Jr | Martin Van Buren; Kilgore College | Queens, NY |
| G | 15 | Sam Burmeister | 6 ft 4 in (1.93 m) | 200 lb (91 kg) | RS Jr | Churchill | San Antonio, TX |
| PF | 20 | Marek Hulva | 6 ft 8 in (2.03 m) | 230 lb (104 kg) | RS Fr | Slezske Gymnazium Opava; Lewis and Clark Community College | Opava, Czech Republic |
| SG | 23 | Jorden Kite | 6 ft 3 in (1.91 m) | 180 lb (82 kg) | RS Fr | Clark | San Antonio, TX |
| G | 24 | Phillip Johnson | 6 ft 5 in (1.96 m) | 197 lb (89 kg) | Sr | Edison | New Orleans, LA |
| F | 32 | Jerred Kite | 6 ft 11 in (2.11 m) | 215 lb (98 kg) | Sr | Antonian; Texas A&M-Corpus Christi | San Antonio, TX |
| G | 41 | Shawn Johnson | 6 ft 5 in (1.96 m) | 195 lb (88 kg) | Jr | Alief Hastings | New Orleans, LA |

Head coach

- Ken Burmeister (Saint Mary's)

Assistant coach(es)

- Brian Curtis (Incarnate Word)
- John Smith (Northwestern State)
- Johnny Brown (New Mexico)

Legend

- (C) Team captain
- (S) Suspended
- (I) Ineligible
- (W) Walk-on
- Injured
- Current redshirt

Roster
Last update: 2016-12-02

== Schedule and results ==
| Date time, TV | Opponent | Result | Record | Site (attendance) city, state |
Non-Conference regular season
| November 11, 2016*; 7:00 pm, LHN | at No. 21 Texas | L 73–78 | 0–1 | Frank Erwin Center (10,922); Austin, TX |
| November 15*; 7:00 pm, SPEC TX | St. Edward's | W 93–90 | 1–1 | McDermott Center (685); San Antonio, TX |
| November 21*; 7:00 pm, SPEC TX | Howard Payne | W 91–61 | 2–1 | McDermott Center (400); San Antonio, TX |
| November 26*; 3:00 pm | Rice | L 79–87 | 2–2 | McDermott Center (530); San Antonio, TX |
| November 30*; 6:30 pm, FCS | at Texas Tech | L 48–69 | 2–3 | United Supermarkets Arena (6,365); Lubbock, TX |
| December 3*; 3:00 pm | LIU Brooklyn | W 90–79 | 3–3 | McDermott Center (500); San Antonio, TX |
| December 7*; 7:00 pm | Texas Lutheran | W 78–71 | 4–3 | McDermott Center (395); San Antonio, TX |
| December 10*; 7:00 pm, SPEC TX | Texas A&M International | W 83–68 | 5–3 | McDermott Center (220); San Antonio, TX |
| December 14*; 9:00 pm, MW Net | at UNLV | L 64–92 | 5–4 | Thomas & Mack Center (8,202); Las Vegas, NV |
| December 17*; 6:00 pm, TheW.tv | at Loyola Marymount | L 90–91 | 5–5 | Gersten Pavilion (1,612); Los Angeles, CA |
| December 21*; 7:00 pm, ESPN3 | at Memphis | L 71–95 | 5–6 | FedEx Forum (7,919); Memphis, TN |
Southland regular season
| December 31; 1:00 pm | at Nicholls | L 84–94 | 5–7 (0–1) | Stopher Gym (501); Thibodaux, LA |
| January 2, 2017; 2:00 pm | at Southeastern Louisiana | L 63–74 | 5–8 (0–2) | University Center (552); Hammond, LA |
| January 5; 7:30 pm | Northwestern State | W 84–80 | 6–8 (1–2) | McDermott Center (698); San Antonio, TX |
| January 7; 3:00 pm | New Orleans | L 72–87 | 6–9 (1–3) | McDermott Center (751); San Antonio, TX |
| January 11; 7:00 pm, SPEC TX | at Lamar | L 72–87 | 6–10 (1–4) | Montagne Center (1,812); Beaumont, TX |
| January 14; 3:00 pm | Houston Baptist | W 82–77 | 7–10 (2–4) | McDermott Center (726); San Antonio, TX |
| January 21; 7:30 pm, ESPN3 | Stephen F. Austin | W 70–68 | 8–10 (3–4) | McDermott Center (1,698); San Antonio, TX |
| January 26; 7:00 pm | Abilene Christian | W 82–79 | 9–10 (4–4) | McDermott Center (1,177); San Antonio, TX |
| January 28; 4:00 pm | at Central Arkansas | W 81–80 | 10–10 (5–4) | Farris Center (538); Conway, AR |
| February 2; 7:30 pm | McNeese State | L 79–87 | 10–11 (5–5) | McDermott Center (803); San Antonio, TX |
| February 4; 7:00 pm | at Houston Baptist | L 70–84 | 10–12 (5–6) | Sharp Gymnasium (864); Houston, TX |
| February 9; 8:00 pm, ASN | at Stephen F. Austin | L 79–87 | 10–13 (5–7) | William R. Johnson Coliseum (3,008); Nacogdoches, TX |
| February 11; 6:15 pm | at Sam Houston State | L 63–72 | 10–14 (5–8) | Bernard Johnson Coliseum (1,634); Huntsville, TX |
| February 15; 7:30 pm | Texas A&M–Corpus Christi | L 81–97 | 10–15 (5–9) | McDermott Center (1,058); San Antonio, TX |
| February 18; 3:00 pm | Sam Houston State | W 69–53 | 11–15 (6–9) | McDermott Center (1,068); San Antonio, TX |
| February 23; 7:00 pm | Nicholls | L 68–77 | 11–16 (6–10) | McDermott Center (1,743); San Antonio, TX |
| March 1; 7:30 pm | at Abilene Christian | W 89–75 | 12–16 (7–10) | Moody Coliseum (1,875); Abilene, TX |
| March 4; 1:30 pm | at Texas A&M–Corpus Christi | L 64–81 | 12–17 (7–11) | American Bank Center (1,689); Corpus Christi, TX |
*Non-conference game. ^{#}Rankings from AP Poll. (#) Tournament seedings in parentheses. All times are in Central Time.

== See also ==
- 2016–17 Incarnate Word Cardinals women's basketball team
