= 2016–17 Houston Baptist Huskies men's basketball team =

American college basketball season

2016–17 Houston Baptist Huskies men's basketball
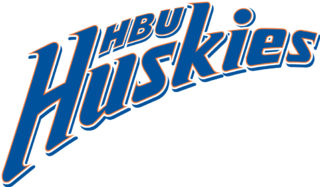

CIT, First Round
- Conference: Southland Conference
- Record: 17–14 (12–6 Southland)
- Head coach: Ron Cottrell (26th season)
- Assistant coaches: Steven Key; Justin "Jud" Kinne; Keith Berard
- Home arena: Sharp Gymnasium (Capacity: 1,000)

2016–17 Southland Conference men's basketball standings
| | Conf. | | | | Overall |
| Team | W | | L | PCT | W | | L | PCT |
|---|---|---|---|---|---|---|---|---|
| New Orleans † | 13 | – | 5 | .722 | 20 | – | 12 | .625 |
| Texas A&M–CC | 12 | – | 6 | .667 | 24 | – | 12 | .667 |
| Houston Baptist | 12 | – | 6 | .667 | 17 | – | 14 | .548 |
| Stephen F. Austin | 12 | – | 6 | .667 | 18 | – | 15 | .545 |
| Sam Houston State | 10 | – | 8 | .556 | 21 | – | 13 | .618 |
| Lamar | 10 | – | 8 | .556 | 19 | – | 15 | .559 |
| Southeastern Louisiana | 9 | – | 9 | .500 | 16 | – | 16 | .500 |
| Nicholls State | 7 | – | 11 | .389 | 14 | – | 17 | .452 |
| Abilene Christian* | 7 | – | 11 | .389 | 13 | – | 16 | .448 |
| Northwestern State | 7 | – | 11 | .389 | 13 | – | 16 | .448 |
| Incarnate Word* | 7 | – | 11 | .389 | 12 | – | 17 | .414 |
| Central Arkansas | 7 | – | 11 | .389 | 8 | – | 24 | .250 |
| McNeese State | 4 | – | 14 | .222 | 7 | – | 22 | .241 |
† 2017 Southland tournament winner * Ineligible for postseason during transition to Division I

The 2016–17 Houston Baptist Huskies men's basketball team represented Houston Baptist University in the 2016–17 NCAA Division I men's basketball season. The season was head coach Ron Cottrell's 26th season at HBU. The Huskies played their home games at Sharp Gymnasium as members of the Southland Conference. They finished the season 17–14, 12–6 in Southland play to finish in a three-way tie for second place. They lost in the quarterfinals of the Southland tournament to Sam Houston State. The Huskies received an invitation to the CollegeInsider.com Tournament where they lost in the first round to Campbell.

== Previous season ==
The Huskies finished the 2015–16 season 17–17, 10–8 in Southland play to finish in fifth place. They defeated Southeastern Louisiana in the quarterfinals of the Southland tournament before losing to Stephen F. Austin in the semifinals. The Huskies received an invitation to the College Basketball Invitational where they lost in the first round to UNC Greensboro.

== Media ==
All Houston Baptist games were broadcast online live by the Legacy Sports Network (LSN). LSN also provided online video for every non-televised Huskies home game. However HBU games did air on ESPN3 as part of the Southland Conference TV packages.

== Roster ==
2016–17 Houston Baptist Huskies men's basketball team
Players
Coaches

| Pos. | # | Name | Height | Weight | Year | Previous school | Hometown |
|---|---|---|---|---|---|---|---|
| G | 2 | Anthony Odunsi | 6 ft 4 in (1.93 m) | 205 lb (93 kg) | RS Sr | Travis; Utah/Tyler JC/Albany | Sugar Land, TX |
| G | 3 | Asa Cantwell | 6 ft 3 in (1.91 m) | 180 lb (82 kg) | Fr | Johnson | San Antonio, TX |
| C | 4 | Cody Stetler | 6 ft 9 in (2.06 m) | 235 lb (107 kg) | Jr | Hoisington | Hoisington, KS |
| F | 5 | Colter Lasher | 6 ft 7 in (2.01 m) | 215 lb (98 kg) | Jr | Dimond; Impact Prep | Anchorage, AK |
| G | 10 | Trey Patterson | 6 ft 4 in (1.93 m) | 180 lb (82 kg) | So | Plano East | Plano, TX |
| G/F | 11 | Caleb Crayton | 6 ft 3 in (1.91 m) | 205 lb (93 kg) | Sr | Northeast Academy | Oklahoma City, OK |
| G/F | 12 | Terry Harris | 6 ft 6 in (1.98 m) | 215 lb (98 kg) | So | Half Hollow Hills West | Dix Hills, NY |
| G | 13 | Stephen O'Suji | 5 ft 10 in (1.78 m) | 190 lb (86 kg) | So | Kinkaid | Houston, TX |
| G | 14 | Nic Thomas | 6 ft 2 in (1.88 m) | 180 lb (82 kg) | Fr | HSAA | Arlington, TX |
| G | 15 | Reveal Chukwujekwu | 6 ft 3 in (1.91 m) | 205 lb (93 kg) | Jr | Strake Jesuit | Houston, TX |
| G/F | 23 | Alex Fountain | 6 ft 7 in (2.01 m) | 210 lb (95 kg) | Jr | Wartburg Central | Wartburg, TN |
| G | 24 | Kyren Block | 6 ft 6 in (1.98 m) | 180 lb (82 kg) | Fr | Brennan | San Antonio, TX |
| G | 25 | Will Gates, Jr. | 6 ft 1 in (1.85 m) | 190 lb (86 kg) | Jr | Clemens; Furman | San Antonio, TX |
| G/F | 30 | Jourdan Stickler | 6 ft 4 in (1.93 m) | 180 lb (82 kg) | Sr | Annapolis High School; Morehead State/Blinn | Annapolis, MD |
| C | 33 | Isaiah Robinson | 6 ft 10 in (2.08 m) | 215 lb (98 kg) | Fr | Jefferson | Portland, OR |
| C | 44 | Josh Ibarra | 6 ft 11 in (2.11 m) | 250 lb (113 kg) | So | Angleton High School | Angleton, TX |
| G | 55 | Evan Anderson | 6 ft 0 in (1.83 m) | 170 lb (77 kg) | Fr | Bradford | Kenosha, WI |

Head coach

- Ron Cottrell (Arkansas)

Assistant coach(es)

- Steven Key (Houston Baptist)
- Justin 'Jud' Kinne (Albion)
- Keith Berard (Southern Utah)

Legend

- (C) Team captain
- (S) Suspended
- (I) Ineligible
- (W) Walk-on
- Injured
- Current redshirt

Roster
Last update: 2016-09-24

== Schedule and results ==
| Date time, TV | Rank^{#} | Opponent^{#} | Result | Record | Site (attendance) city, state |
Regular season
| November 11, 2016*; 6:30 pm | | at Texas Tech | L 67–93 | 0–1 | United Supermarkets Arena (10,989); Lubbock, TX |
| November 14*; 8:00 pm | | at New Mexico | L 79–95 | 0–2 | The Pit (11,666); Albuquerque, NM |
| November 18*; 7:00 pm | | Dallas Christian | W 98–54 | 1–2 | Sharp Gym (678); Houston, TX |
| November 22*; 7:00 pm | | Ecclesia | W 116–80 | 2–2 | Sharp Gym (542); Houston, TX |
| November 26*; 6:30 pm | | at Marquette | L 79–101 | 2–3 | BMO Harris Bradley Center (11,740); Milwaukee, WI |
| November 30*; 7:00 pm | | at Rice | L 77–90 | 2–4 | Tudor Fieldhouse (1,766); Houston, TX |
| December 7*; 7:00 pm | | Saint Peter's | W 62–47 | 3–4 | Sharp Gym (589); Houston, TX |
| December 10*; 4:00 pm, BTN | | at No. 9 Indiana | L 61–103 | 3–5 | Assembly Hall (Bloomington) (17,222); Bloomington, IN |
| December 17*; 7:00 pm | | Arlington Baptist | W 103–77 | 4–5 | Sharp Gym (584); Houston, TX |
| December 22*; 7:00 pm, BTN+ | | at Northwestern | L 63–72 | 4–6 | Welsh-Ryan Arena (6,372); Evanston, IL |
| December 29; 6:30 pm | | at Sam Houston State | W 79–65 | 5–6 (1–0) | Bernard Johnson Coliseum (860); Huntsville, TX |
| December 31; 4:00 pm, ESPN3 | | at Stephen F. Austin | L 51–61 | 5–7 (1–1) | William R. Johnson Coliseum (2,489); Nacogdoches, TX |
| January 5, 2017; 7:00 pm | | Southeastern Louisiana | W 81–74 | 6–7 (2–1) | Sharp Gym (761); Houston, TX |
| January 7; 7:00 pm | | McNeese State | W 60–49 | 7–7 (3–1) | Sharp Gym (694); Houston, TX |
| January 12; 8:00 pm | | Central Arkansas | L 78–89 | 7–8 (3–2) | Sharp Gym (597); Houston, TX |
| January 14; 3:00 pm | | at Incarnate Word | L 77–82 | 7–9 (3–3) | McDermott Center (726); San Antonio, TX |
| January 19; 7:00 pm | | at New Orleans | L 64–72 | 7–10 (3–4) | Lakefront Arena (727); New Orleans, LA |
| January 21; 5:00 pm | | at Southeastern Louisiana | L 71–83 | 7–11 (3–5) | University Center (674); Hammond, LA |
| January 26; 7:00 pm | | Nicholls | W 83–80 | 8–11 (4–5) | Sharp Gym (783); Houston, TX |
| February 1; 7:30 pm | | at Texas A&M–Corpus Christi | L 79–90 | 8–12 (4–6) | American Bank Center (1,132); Corpus Christi, TX |
| February 4; 7:00 pm | | Incarnate Word | W 84–70 | 9–12 (5–6) | Sharp Gym (864); Houston, TX |
| February 9; 7:30 pm | | at Northwestern State | W 86–69 | 10–12 (6–6) | Prather Coliseum (1,522); Natchitoches, LA |
| February 11; 7:00 pm | | Lamar | W 94–87 | 11–12 (7–6) | Sharp Gym (952); Houston, TX |
| February 16; 7:00 pm | | Sam Houston State | W 88–77 | 12–12 (8–6) | Sharp Gym (872); Houston, TX |
| February 18*; 7:00 pm | | Randall | W 92–78 | 13–12 | Sharp Gym (572); Houston, TX |
| February 23; 7:00 pm | | at McNeese State | W 81–79 | 14–12 (9–6) | Burton Coliseum (479); Lake Charles, LA |
| February 25; 4:30 pm, ESPN3 | | at Lamar | W 75–68 | 15–12 (10–6) | Montagne Center (2,134); Beaumont, TX |
| March 1; 7:30 pm | | Texas A&M–Corpus Christi | W 94–80 | 16–12 (11–6) | Sharp Gym (787); Houston, TX |
| March 4; 7:00 pm | | Abilene Christian | W 81–72 | 17–12 (12–6) | Sharp Gym (963); Houston, TX |
Southland tournament
| March 9; 5:00 pm, ESPN3 | (4) | vs. (5) Sam Houston State; Quarterfinals | L 59–63 | 17–13 | Merrell Center (1,756); Katy, TX |
CIT
| March 14*; 6:00 pm, Facebook Live | | at Campbell; First Round | L 79–98 | 17–14 | Gore Arena (1,735); Buies Creek, NC |
*Non-conference game. ^{#}Rankings from AP Poll. (#) Tournament seedings in parentheses. All times are in Central Source:.

== See also ==
- 2016–17 Houston Baptist Huskies women's basketball team
