= 2016–17 Stephen F. Austin Lumberjacks basketball team =

American college basketball season

2016–17 Stephen F. Austin Lumberjacks basketball

CIT, First Round
- Conference: Southland Conference
- Record: 0–15, 18 wins vacated (0–6 Southland, 12 wins vacated)
- Head coach: Kyle Keller (1st season)
- Assistant coaches: Jeremy Cox; Derrick Jones; Wade Mason
- Home arena: William R. Johnson Coliseum (Capacity: 7,203)

2016–17 Southland Conference men's basketball standings
	Conf.				Overall
Team	W		L	PCT	W		L	PCT
New Orleans †	13	–	5	.722	20	–	12	.625
Texas A&M–CC	12	–	6	.667	24	–	12	.667
Houston Baptist	12	–	6	.667	17	–	14	.548
Stephen F. Austin	12	–	6	.667	18	–	15	.545
Sam Houston State	10	–	8	.556	21	–	13	.618
Lamar	10	–	8	.556	19	–	15	.559
Southeastern Louisiana	9	–	9	.500	16	–	16	.500
Nicholls State	7	–	11	.389	14	–	17	.452
Abilene Christian*	7	–	11	.389	13	–	16	.448
Northwestern State	7	–	11	.389	13	–	16	.448
Incarnate Word*	7	–	11	.389	12	–	17	.414
Central Arkansas	7	–	11	.389	8	–	24	.250
McNeese State	4	–	14	.222	7	–	22	.241
† 2017 Southland tournament winner * Ineligible for postseason during transition to Division I

The 2016–17 Stephen F. Austin Lumberjacks basketball team represented Stephen F. Austin State University during the 2016–17 NCAA Division I men's basketball season. The Lumberjacks were led by first-year head coach Kyle Keller and played their home games at the William R. Johnson Coliseum as members of the Southland Conference. They finished the season 18–18, 12–6 in Southland play to finish in a three-way tie for second place. They defeated Lamar in the quarterfinals of the Southland tournament to advance to the Semifinals where they lost to Texas A&M–Corpus Christi. They were invited to the CollegeInsider.com Tournament where they lost in the first round to Idaho.

On May 20, 2020, following the discovery of an administrative error in certifying eligibility for student-athletes, Stephen F. Austin reached an agreement with the NCAA to vacate hundreds of wins across multiple sports from 2013 to 2019, including all 117 men's basketball wins from the 2014–15 to 2018–19 seasons.

== Previous season ==
The Lumberjacks finished the 2015–16 season with a record of 28–6, 18–0 in Southland play to win the regular season championship. They won the Southland tournament championship to earn the conference's automatic bid to the NCAA tournament. As a No. 14 seed, they upset No. 3-ranked West Virginia in the first round before losing in the final seconds to Notre Dame in the second round.

On March 21, 2016, head coach Brad Underwood left the school and was named the head coach at Oklahoma State. On April 4, 2016, Kyle Keller was named head coach.

== Roster ==
2016–17 Stephen F. Austin Lumberjacks men's basketball team
Players
Coaches

Pos.	#	Name	Height	Weight	Year	Previous school	Hometown
G	1	Demetrious Floyd	5 ft 11 in (1.8 m)	170 lb (77 kg)	Sr	McCluer HS; Chipola College	St. Louis, MO
F	2	CJ Williams	6 ft 7 in (2.01 m)	240 lb (109 kg)	Jr	Pebblebrook	Powder Springs, GA
G	3	Jared Johnson	6 ft 0 in (1.83 m)	170 lb (77 kg)	Sr	Ridge View HS; Hill College	Columbia, SC
G	4	Ty Charles	6 ft 5 in (1.96 m)	190 lb (86 kg)	So	Kennedale HS	Kennedale, TX
G	5	Lasani Johnson	6 ft 1 in (1.85 m)	178 lb (81 kg)	Fr	Bishop Dunne	Dallas, TX
G	10	Trey Pinkney	5 ft 9 in (1.75 m)	160 lb (73 kg)	Sr	Seven Lakes HS	Katy, TX
F	11	Clide Geffrard	6 ft 5 in (1.96 m)	220 lb (100 kg)	Sr	Ely HS; Northwest Florida State College	Pompano Beach, FL
G	12	Dallas Cameron	6 ft 3 in (1.91 m)	180 lb (82 kg)	Jr	Ely HS	Pompano Beach, FL
G	15	Payton Stephens	6 ft 4 in (1.93 m)	215 lb (98 kg)	Fr	McPherson	McPherson, KS
F	22	T. J. Holyfield	6 ft 8 in (2.03 m)	210 lb (95 kg)	So	Elev8 Sports Institute (Fla.)	Albuquerque, NM
F	23	Nathan Bain	6 ft 6 in (1.98 m)	200 lb (91 kg)	Fr	Sunrise Christian Academy (Kan.)	Freeport, Bahamas
G	24	Jonny Dahl	6 ft 4 in (1.93 m)	195 lb (88 kg)	Fr	Keokuk	Keokuk, IA
C	32	Jovan Grujić	7 ft 0 in (2.13 m)	225 lb (102 kg)	Fr	South Kent School (Conn.)	Pančevo, Serbia
F	35	JaQuan Smith	6 ft 9 in (2.06 m)	250 lb (113 kg)	Jr	Edmondson	Baltimore, MD

Head coach

- Kyle Keller (Oklahoma State)

Assistant coach(es)

- Jeremy Cox (Colorado Mesa)
- Derrick Jones (Samford)
- Wade Mason (Tulane)

Legend

- (C) Team captain
- (S) Suspended
- (I) Ineligible
- (W) Walk-on
- Injured
- Current redshirt

Roster
Last update: September 27, 2016

== Schedule and results ==
Date time, TV	Rank^{#}	Opponent^{#}	Result	Record	Site (attendance) city, state
Exhibition
November 4, 2016*; 6:30 pm, ESPN3		Huston–Tillotson	W 93–72		William R. Johnson Coliseum; Nacogdoches, TX
Non-conference regular season
November 11, 2016*; 6:00 pm, SECN		at No. 2 Kentucky	L 64–87	0–1	Rupp Arena (22,683); Lexington, KY
November 15, 2016*; 10:00 am, ESPN3		Longwood	W 66–60	1–1	William R. Johnson Coliseum (5,944); Nacogdoches, TX
November 18, 2016*; 7:00 pm, ESPN3		Northeastern State	W 75–70	2–1	William R. Johnson Coliseum (4,103); Nacogdoches, TX
November 28, 2016*; 7:00 pm		at Louisiana–Monroe	L 72–77	2–2	Fant–Ewing Coliseum (645); Monroe, LA
December 1, 2016*; 8:00 pm, SECN		at Arkansas	L 62–78	2–3	Bud Walton Arena (13,358); Fayetteville, AR
December 3, 2016*; 2:00 pm, ESPN3		Centenary	W 90–59	3–3	William R. Johnson Coliseum (3,024); Nacogdoches, TX
December 7, 2016*; 7:00 pm, ESPN3		UAB	L 73–84	3–4	William R. Johnson Coliseum (3,650); Nacogdoches, TX
December 10, 2016*; 7:00 pm		at Rice	L 63–70	3–5	Tudor Fieldhouse (2,205); Houston, TX
12/19/2016*; 5:00 pm, ESPN3		LSU Shreveport	W 93–73	4–5	William R. Johnson Coliseum (1,464); Nacogdoches, TX
December 22, 2016*; 3:30 pm, ESPNU		vs. Tulsa; Diamond Head Classic quarterfinals	L 51–74	4–6	Stan Sheriff Center (5,942); Honolulu, HI
December 23, 2016*; 5:30 pm, ESPN3		vs. Southern Miss; Diamond Head Classic consolation round	W 67–64	5–6	Stan Sheriff Center (5,873); Honolulu, HI
December 25, 2016*; 1:30 pm		vs. Utah; Diamond Head Classic 5th place game	L 66–74	5–7	Stan Sheriff Center (5,769); Honolulu, HI
Southland Conference regular season
December 31, 2016; 4:00 pm, ESPN3		Houston Baptist	W 61–51	6–7 (1–0)	William R. Johnson Coliseum (2,489); Nacogdoches, TX
January 2, 2017; 7:30 pm		at McNeese State	L 54–69	6–8 (1–1)	Burton Coliseum (531); Lake Charles, LA
January 7, 2017; 4:00 pm		at Abilene Christian	L 60–69	6–9 (1–2)	Moody Coliseum (1,217); Abilene, TX
January 11, 2017; 7:00 pm, ESPN3		Texas A&M–Corpus Christi	W 79–46	7–9 (2–2)	William R. Johnson Coliseum (1,749); Nacogdoches, TX
January 14, 2017; 4:00 pm, ESPN3		Nicholls	W 80–60	8–9 (3–2)	William R. Johnson Coliseum (2,273); Nacogdoches, TX
January 19, 2017; 7:00 pm		at Texas A&M–Corpus Christi	W 61–58	9–9 (4–2)	American Bank Center (2,377); Corpus Christi, TX
January 21, 2017; 7:30 pm		at Incarnate Word	L 68–70	9–10 (4–3)	McDermott Center (1,698); San Antonio, TX
January 25, 2017; 8:00 pm, ESPN3		Central Arkansas	W 78–76	10–10 (5–3)	William R. Johnson Coliseum (3,612); Nacogdoches, TX
January 28, 2017; 6:00 pm, ESPN3		New Orleans	W 71–61	11–10 (6–3)	William R. Johnson Coliseum (4,166); Nacogdoches, TX
February 2, 2017; 7:30 pm		at Sam Houston State	L 63–72	11–11 (6–4)	Bernard Johnson Coliseum (3,034); Huntsville, TX
February 4, 2017; 3:00 pm		at Northwestern State	W 75–73 ^{OT}	12–11 (7–4)	Prather Coliseum (2,303); Natchitoches, LA
February 9, 2017; 8:00 pm		Incarnate Word	W 87–79	13–11 (8–4)	William R. Johnson Coliseum (3,008); Nacogdoches, LA
February 16, 2017; 8:00 pm, ESPN3		Lamar	W 70–61	14–11 (9–4)	William R. Johnson Coliseum (3,719); Nacogdoches, TX
February 18, 2017; 5:00 pm, ESPN3		at Southeastern Louisiana	W 60–52	15–11 (10–4)	University Center (641); Hammond, LA
February 23, 2017; 7:45 pm, ESPN3		at New Orleans	L 65–82	15–12 (10–5)	Lakefront Arena (1,211); New Orleans, LA
February 25, 2017; 6:00 pm, ESPN3		at Central Arkansas	W 90–85	16–12 (11–5)	Farris Center (858); Conway, AR
March 2, 2017; 8:00 pm, ESPN3		Northwestern State	L 67–72	16–13 (11–6)	William R. Johnson Coliseum (6,207); Nacogdoches, TX
March 4, 2017; 6:00 pm, ESPN3		Sam Houston State	W 64–56	17–13 (12–6)	William R. Johnson Coliseum (5,938); Nacogdoches, TX
Southland Conference tournament
March 9, 2017; 7:30 pm, ESPN3	(3)	vs. (6) Lamar; Quarterfinals	W 75–59	18–13	Merrell Center (1,756); Katy, TX
March 10, 2017; 7:30 pm, ESPN3	(3)	vs. (2) Texas A&M–Corpus Christi; Semifinals	L 69–77	18–14	Merrell Center (2,318); Katy, TX
CIT
March 15, 2017*; 9:00 pm, Facebook Live		at Idaho; First Round	L 50–73	18–15	Memorial Gym (1,109); Moscow, ID
*Non-conference game. ^{#}Rankings from AP Poll. (#) Tournament seedings in parentheses. All times are in Central Time.

== See also ==
- 2016–17 Stephen F. Austin Ladyjacks basketball team
- List of vacated and forfeited games in college basketball
