= 2016–17 Lamar Cardinals basketball team =

American college basketball season

2016–17 Lamar Cardinals basketball

CIT, First Round
- Conference: Southland Conference
- Record: 19–15 (10–8 Southland)
- Head coach: Tic Price (3rd season)
- Assistant coaches: Bobby Kummer (3rd season); Brian Burton (3rd season); Justin Bailey (1st season)
- Home arena: Montagne Center (Capacity 10,080)

For information on all Lamar University sports, see Lamar Cardinals and Lady Cardinals

2016–17 Southland Conference men's basketball standings
	Conf.				Overall
Team	W		L	PCT	W		L	PCT
New Orleans †	13	–	5	.722	20	–	12	.625
Texas A&M–CC	12	–	6	.667	24	–	12	.667
Houston Baptist	12	–	6	.667	17	–	14	.548
Stephen F. Austin	12	–	6	.667	18	–	15	.545
Sam Houston State	10	–	8	.556	21	–	13	.618
Lamar	10	–	8	.556	19	–	15	.559
Southeastern Louisiana	9	–	9	.500	16	–	16	.500
Nicholls State	7	–	11	.389	14	–	17	.452
Abilene Christian*	7	–	11	.389	13	–	16	.448
Northwestern State	7	–	11	.389	13	–	16	.448
Incarnate Word*	7	–	11	.389	12	–	17	.414
Central Arkansas	7	–	11	.389	8	–	24	.250
McNeese State	4	–	14	.222	7	–	22	.241
† 2017 Southland tournament winner * Ineligible for postseason during transition to Division I

The 2016–17 Lamar Cardinals basketball team represented Lamar University during the 2016–17 NCAA Division I men's basketball season. The Cardinals were led by third-year head coach Tic Price and played their home games at the Montagne Center in Beaumont, Texas as members of the Southland Conference. They finished the season 19–15, 10–8 in Southland play to finish in a tie for fifth place. They defeated Southeastern Louisiana in the first round of the Southland tournament to advance to the quarterfinals where they lost to Stephen F. Austin. They were invited to the CollegeInsider.com Tournament where they lost in the first round to Texas State.

== Previous season ==
The Cardinals finished the 2015–16 season 11–19. 3–15 in Southland play to finish in last place. As a result, they failed to qualify for the Southland tournament.

== Media ==
All 2016–17 Lamar Cardinals home games, except those otherwise contracted for, will be broadcast online live on ESPN3. Games will be broadcast over the radio by KLVI AM 560 radio with audio streaming over iheart radio.

== Offseason ==
=== Departures ===
Lamar head coach, Tic Price, announced on March 17, 2016, that sophomore point guard Kevin Booze, freshman forward Boaz Williams, and junior center Christian Kennedy were leaving the team. Assistant coach Anthony Anderson resigned in April, 2016.

Name	Number	Pos.	Height	Weight	Year	Hometown	Notes
Departures
Kevin Booze	0	Guard	5'11"	185	Sophomore	Irving, TX	Left team.
LeMon Gregory	4	Forward	6'9"	251	Senior	Greenville, KY	Completed eligibility
Christian Kennedy	14	Center	6'11"	202	Junior	Warner Robins, GA	Left team.
Boaz Williams	21	Forward	6'6"	197	Freshman	Houston, TX	Left team.
Dontavious Sears	23	Forward	6'3"	184	Senior	Memphis, TN / Eastern Oklahoma State College	Graduated
Quan Jones	24	Guard	6'3"	168	Senior	Little Rock, AR / Connors State College	Completed eligibility

=== Additions ===
On June 2, 2016, Lamar University announced hiring Justin Bailey as assistant coach. Bailey had been an assistant at Arkansas–Fort Smith for four years and was a graduate assistant at Arizona State.

Name	Number	Pos.	Height	Weight	Year	Hometown	Notes
Additions
Torey Noel	1	Guard	5'10"	190	Junior	Oklahoma City, OK	
Cameron McGee	4	Guard	6'2"		Freshman	Dallas, TX	
Tyrin Atwood	15	Forward	6'6"		Freshman	Beaumont, TX	
Colton Wiesbrod	21	Forward	6'5"		Junior	Nederland, TX	
Christian Albright	30	Post	6'8"		Junior	Dallas, TX	
Joey Frenchwood	32	Guard	6'1"	180	Junior	Newark, CA	

== Roster ==
2016–17 Lamar Cardinals men's basketball team
Players
Coaches

Pos.	#	Name	Height	Weight	Year	Previous school	Hometown
F	2	Dorian Chatman	6 ft 7 in (2.01 m)	208 lb (94 kg)	So	Memorial High School	Port Arthur, Texas
G	3	Nick Garth	6 ft 0 in (1.83 m)	191 lb (87 kg)	So	Cypress Lakes High School	Houston, Texas
G	4	Cameron McGee	6 ft 2 in (1.88 m)	185 lb (84 kg)	Fr	Newman Smith High School	Dallas, Texas
G	5	Lincoln Davis	6 ft 1 in (1.85 m)	165 lb (75 kg)	Sr	South Plains College	Pittsburgh, Pennsylvania
G	10	Torey Noel	5 ft 10 in (1.78 m)	190 lb (86 kg)	Jr	Northern Oklahoma College	Oklahoma City, Oklahoma
F	11	Josh Nzeakor	6 ft 8 in (2.03 m)	211 lb (96 kg)	So	Mesquite High School	Mesquite, Texas
G	12	Zjori Bosha	6 ft 5 in (1.96 m)	177 lb (80 kg)	Jr	Hardin-Jefferson High School	Nome, Texas
F	13	Terrance Hubby	6 ft 5 in (1.96 m)	198 lb (90 kg)	So	Mansfield Summit High School	Arlington, Texas
G/F	15	T. J. Atwood	6 ft 6 in (1.98 m)	203 lb (92 kg)	Fr	Central High School	Beaumont, Texas
G/F	20	Marcus Owens	6 ft 2 in (1.88 m)	199 lb (90 kg)	Sr	Deerfield Beach High School	Fort Lauderdale, Florida
F	21	Colton Weisbrod	6 ft 5 in (1.96 m)	218 lb (99 kg)	Jr	Lamar State College–Port Arthur	Nederland, Texas
F	30	Christian Albright	6 ft 8 in (2.03 m)	235 lb (107 kg)	Jr	Lamar State College–Port Arthur	Dallas, Texas
G	32	Joey Frenchwood	6 ft 1 in (1.85 m)	184 lb (83 kg)	Jr	Hill College	Newark, California
F		James Harrison (redshirt)	6 ft 5 in (1.96 m)	200 lb (91 kg)	Sr	UT Martin	Houston, Texas

Head coach

- Tic Price (Virginia Tech)

Assistant coach(es)

- Bobby Kummer (Charlotte)
- Brian Burton (UT Dallas)
- Justin Bailey (Arkansas–Fort Smith)

Legend

- (C) Team captain
- (S) Suspended
- (I) Ineligible
- (W) Walk-on
- Injured
- Current redshirt

Roster

== Schedule and results ==
Date time, TV	Rank^{#}	Opponent^{#}	Result	Record	High points	High rebounds	High assists	Site (attendance) city, state
Non-conference regular season
November 11, 2016*; 7:00 p.m., ESPN3		Howard Payne	W 90–47	1–0	20 – J. Nzeakor	8 – C. Weisbrod	7 – T. Noel	Montagne Center (1,905); Beaumont, TX
November 16*; 8:00 p.m.		at Oregon State	W 63–60	1–0	16 – Weisbrod	12 – Weisbrod	6 – Frenchwood	Gill Coliseum (4,182); Corvallis, OR
November 19*; 1:00 p.m.		at Fresno State	L 64–83	2–1	10 – Tied	8 – Owens	3 – 3 tied	Save Mart Center (5,269); Fresno, CA
November 22*; 7:00 p.m., ESPN3		UTSA	W 78–58	3–1	24 – Garth	8 – Tied	5 – Noel	Montagne Center (1,865); Beaumont, TX
November 25*; 4:00 p.m.		at Prairie View A&M	W 91–83	4–1	25 – Weisbrod	13 – Weisbrod	10 – Noel	William Nicks Building (183); Prairie View, TX
November 29*; 8:05 p.m.		at Idaho State	L 60–77	4–2	14 – Weisbrod	17 – Weisbrod	3 – Tied	Reed Gym (1,534); Pocatello, ID
December 2*; 9:00 p.m.		at San Francisco	L 63–82	4–3	24 – Weisbrod	8 – Weisbrod	2 – Frenchwood	War Memorial Gymnasium (963); San Francisco, CA
December 6*; 8:00 p.m., FSN/WCIU		at DePaul	L 61–80	4–4	21 – Chatman	9 – Weisbrod	7 – Frenchwood	Allstate Arena (4,516); Chicago, IL
December 10*; 2:00 p.m., ESPN3		Austin College	W 109–58	5–4	18 – Weisbrod	8 – Tied	4 – Noel	Montagne Center (1,556); Beaumont, TX
December 16*; 7:00 p.m.		at UTRGV	L 81–95	5–5	21 – Bosha	14 – Weisbrod	5 – Garth	UTRGV Fieldhouse (835); Edinburg, TX
December 19*; 7:00 p.m.		Liberty	W 82–65	6–5	22 – Garth	7 – Chatman	12 – Frenchwood	Montagne Center (1,677); Beaumont, TX
December 21*; 7:00 p.m.		Arlington Baptist	W 126–75	7–5	14 – Garth	5 – Albright	13 – Frenchwood	Montagne Center (1,453); Beaumont, TX
December 29*; 7:30 p.m.		Huston–Tillotson	W 90–63	8–5	19 – Weisbrod	10 – Weisbrod	10 – Frenchwood	Montagne Center (1,947); Beaumont, TX
Southland Conference regular season
January 2, 2017; 8:00 p.m.		at Central Arkansas	W 78–75	9–5 (1–0)	22 – Nzeakor	12 – Weisbrod	7 – Frenchwood	Farris Center (635); Conway, AR
January 5; 7:30 p.m., ESPN3		New Orleans	L 62–66 ^{OT}	9–6 (1–1)	13 – Garth	11 – Bosha	3 – Noel	Montagne Center (2,017); Beaumont, TX
January 7; 4:30 p.m., ESPN3		Southeastern Louisiana	W 74–54	10–6 (2–1)	34 – Weisbrod	8 – Tied	3 – Noel	Montagne Center (1,988); Beaumont, TX
January 11; 7:00 p.m., ESPN3		Incarnate Word	W 87–72	11–6 (3–1)	26 – Weisbrod	13 – Weisbrod	4 – Nzeakor	Montagne Center (1,812); Beaumont, TX
January 14; 4:00 p.m.		at Abilene Christian	L 64–67	11–7 (3–2)	21 – Weisbrod	10 – Weisbrod	2 – Tied	Moody Coliseum (1,144); Abilene, TX
January 19; 6:30 p.m.		at Sam Houston State	L 65–87	11–8 (3–3)	11 – Nzeakor	10 – Nzeakor	7 – Frenchwood	Bernard Johnson Coliseum (1,071); Huntsville, TX
January 21; 3:30 p.m.		at Nicholls	W 87–76	12–8 (4–3)	18 – Garth	11 – Nzeakor	6 – Noel	Stopher Gym (533); Thibodaux, LA
January 25; 8:00 p.m., ESPN3		Texas A&M–Corpus Christi	L 66–69 ^{OT}	12–9 (4–4)	14 – Weisbrod	8 – Nzeakor	8 – Frenchwood	Montagne Center (2,188); Beaumont, TX
January 28; 4:30 p.m., ESPN3		Northwestern State	W 85–64	13–9 (5–4)	18 – Tied	9 – Weisbrod	8 – Noel	Montagne Center (2,109); Beaumont, TX
February 4; 4:30 p.m., ESPN3		McNeese State	W 77–57	14–9 (6–4)	20 – Weisbrod	14 – Weisbrod	3 – Tied	Montagne Center (2,774); Beaumont, TX
February 9; 7:30 p.m., ESPN3		Sam Houston State	W 80–76 ^{OT}	15–9 (7–4)	16 – Weisbrod	9 – Owens	8 – Frenchwood	Montagne Center (2,538); Beaumont, TX
February 11; 7:00 p.m.		at Houston Baptist	L 87–94	15–10 (7–5)	24 – Garth	4 – Tied	6 – Garth	Sharp Gymnasium (952); Houston, TX
February 16; 8:00 p.m., ESPN3		at Stephen F. Austin	L 61–70	15–11 (7–6)	12 – Nzeakor	7 – Bosha	4 – Frenchwood	William R. Johnson Coliseum (3,719); Nacogdoches, TX
February 18; 7:00 p.m.		at Texas A&M–Corpus Christi	L 63–70	15–12 (7–7)	18 – Weisbrod	12 – Weisbrod	2 – Tied	American Bank Center (3,535); Corpus Christi, TX
February 22; 8:00 p.m.		at Northwestern State	W 88–68	16–12 (8–7)	16 – Weisbrod	9 – Bosha	4 – Frenchwood	Prather Coliseum (1,323); Natchitoches, LA
February 25; 4:30 p.m., ESPN3		Houston Baptist	L 68–75	6–13 (8–8)	24 – Weisbrod	7 – Weisbrod	3 – Tied	Montagne Center (2,134); Beaumont, TX
March 2; 7:00 p.m., ESPN3		Nicholls	W 87–75	17–13 (9–8)	23 – Davis	7 – Albright	10 – Frenchwood	Montagne Center (2,278); Beaumont, TX
March 4; 3:00 p.m., ESPN3		at McNeese State	W 90–83	18–13 (10–8)	32 – Weisbrod	9 – Weisbrod	5 – Frenchwood	Burton Coliseum (400); Lake Charles, LA
Southland tournament
March 8; 7:30 pm, ESPN3	(6)	vs. (7) Southeastern Louisiana; First Round	W 77–65	19–13	17 – Garth	9 – Weisbrod	3 – Tied	Merrell Center (1,127); Katy, TX
March 9; 7:30 pm, ESPN3	(6)	vs. (3) Stephen F. Austin; Quarterfinals	L 59–75	19–14	14 – Noel	3 – 3 tied	4 – Garth	Merrell Center (1,756); Katy, TX
CIT
March 16*; 7:30 pm, Facebook Live		at Texas State; First Round	L 60–70	19–15	11 – Atwood	5 – Bosha	3 – Garth	Strahan Coliseum (1,255); San Marcos, TX
*Non-conference game. ^{#}Rankings from AP Poll. (#) Tournament seedings in parentheses. All times are in Central Time.

== See also ==
- 2016–17 Lamar Lady Cardinals basketball team
