= 2016–17 Central Arkansas Bears basketball team =

American college basketball season

2016–17 Central Arkansas Bears basketball
- Conference: Southland Conference
- Record: 8–24 (7–11 Southland)
- Head coach: Russ Pennell (3rd season)
- Assistant coaches: Anthony Boone (3rd season); Matt Scherbenske; Josh Lowery
- Home arena: Farris Center (Capacity: 6,000)

2016–17 Southland Conference men's basketball standings
| | Conf. | | | | Overall |
| Team | W | | L | PCT | W | | L | PCT |
|---|---|---|---|---|---|---|---|---|
| New Orleans † | 13 | – | 5 | .722 | 20 | – | 12 | .625 |
| Texas A&M–CC | 12 | – | 6 | .667 | 24 | – | 12 | .667 |
| Houston Baptist | 12 | – | 6 | .667 | 17 | – | 14 | .548 |
| Stephen F. Austin | 12 | – | 6 | .667 | 18 | – | 15 | .545 |
| Sam Houston State | 10 | – | 8 | .556 | 21 | – | 13 | .618 |
| Lamar | 10 | – | 8 | .556 | 19 | – | 15 | .559 |
| Southeastern Louisiana | 9 | – | 9 | .500 | 16 | – | 16 | .500 |
| Nicholls State | 7 | – | 11 | .389 | 14 | – | 17 | .452 |
| Abilene Christian* | 7 | – | 11 | .389 | 13 | – | 16 | .448 |
| Northwestern State | 7 | – | 11 | .389 | 13 | – | 16 | .448 |
| Incarnate Word* | 7 | – | 11 | .389 | 12 | – | 17 | .414 |
| Central Arkansas | 7 | – | 11 | .389 | 8 | – | 24 | .250 |
| McNeese State | 4 | – | 14 | .222 | 7 | – | 22 | .241 |
† 2017 Southland tournament winner * Ineligible for postseason during transition to Division I

The 2016–17 Central Arkansas Bears basketball team represented the University of Central Arkansas during the 2016–17 NCAA Division I men's basketball season. The Bears were led by third-year head coach Russ Pennell and played their home games at the Farris Center in Conway, Arkansas as members of the Southland Conference. They finished the season 8–24, 7–11 in Southland play to finish in a five-way tie for eighth place. They lost in the first round of the Southland tournament to Sam Houston State.

== Previous season ==
The Bears finished the 2015–16 season 7–21, 6–12 in Southland play to finish in a three-way tie for ninth place. Due to APR penalties, they were not eligible for postseason play, including the Southland tournament.

== Roster ==
2016–17 Central Arkansas Bears men's basketball team
Players
Coaches

| Pos. | # | Name | Height | Weight | Year | Previous school | Hometown |
|---|---|---|---|---|---|---|---|
| F | 00 | Boo Milligan | 6 ft 6 in (1.98 m) | 200 lb (91 kg) | So | Future College Prep | Los Angeles, CA |
| G | 1 | Jordan Howard | 5 ft 11 in (1.8 m) | 180 lb (82 kg) | So | Perry HS | Chandler, AZ |
| F | 2 | Ethan Lee | 6 ft 7 in (2.01 m) | 200 lb (91 kg) | Jr | Camden Fairview | Camden, AR |
| G | 3 | Tyler Simmons | 6 ft 1 in (1.85 m) | 175 lb (79 kg) | So | Greenbrier | Greenbrier, AR |
| F/C | 4 | Albert Christensson | 6 ft 9 in (2.06 m) | 215 lb (98 kg) | So | South Kent Prep (Conn.) | Lund, Sweden |
| F | 5 | Justin Foreman | 6 ft 5 in (1.96 m) | 225 lb (102 kg) | Sr | Grand Canyon University | Bellaire, TX |
| G | 10 | Mathieu Kamba | 6 ft 5 in (1.96 m) | 210 lb (95 kg) | So | Bishop McNally | Calgary, AB, Canada |
| G | 11 | Jeff Lowery | 6 ft 2 in (1.88 m) | 195 lb (88 kg) | Jr | Grand Canyon University | Phoenix, AZ |
| F | 13 | Otas Iyekekpolor | 6 ft 8 in (2.03 m) | 220 lb (100 kg) | So | Lillian Osborne HS | Edmonton, AB, Canada |
| F/C | 22 | Tanner Schmit | 6 ft 8 in (2.03 m) | 222 lb (101 kg) | Fr | Nicholls School | Buffalo, NY |
| G | 25 | Thatch Unruh | 6 ft 5 in (1.96 m) | 190 lb (86 kg) | So | Quakerdale Prep | Branson, MO |
| G | 30 | Mike Martin | 6 ft 0 in (1.83 m) | 190 lb (86 kg) | Sr | Coffeyville CC | Wichita, KS |
| G | 32 | Derreck Brooks | 6 ft 6 in (1.98 m) | 185 lb (84 kg) | Jr | Phoenix College | Portland, OR |
| C | 52 | Jake Zuilhof | 6 ft 9 in (2.06 m) | 240 lb (109 kg) | GS | Grand Canyon University | Azle, TX |

Head coach

- Russ Pennell

Assistant coach(es)

- Anthony Boone (Mississippi)
- Matt Scherbenske
- Josh Lowery

Legend

- (C) Team captain
- (S) Suspended
- (I) Ineligible
- (W) Walk-on
- Injured
- Current redshirt

Roster
Last update: 2015-12-05

== Schedule and results ==
| Date time, TV | Rank^{#} | Opponent^{#} | Result | Record | Site (attendance) city, state |
Exhibition
| Oct 29, 2016*; 3:00 pm | | Southwest Baptist | W 90–55 | | Farris Center; Conway, AR |
Non-Conference regular season
| Nov 11, 2016*; 7:00 pm, BTN+ | | at No. 9 Wisconsin; Maui on the Mainland | L 47–79 | 0–1 | Kohl Center (17,287); Madison, WI |
| Nov 14, 2016*; 7:00 pm, FSOK+ | | at Oklahoma State; Maui on the Mainland | L 90–102 | 0–2 | Gallagher-Iba Arena (4,911); Stillwater, OK |
| Nov 19, 2016*; 7:30 pm | | vs. Chattanooga; Maui on the Mainland | L 64–75 | 0–3 | Christl Arena (921); West Point, NY |
| Nov 20, 2016*; 1:30 pm | | vs. Army; Maui on the Mainland | W 81–76 | 1–3 | Christl Arena (670); West Point, NY |
| Nov 26, 2016*; 1:00 pm, ESPN3 | | at Western Michigan | L 63–80 | 1–4 | University Arena (1,844); Kalamazoo, MI |
| Nov 29, 2016*; 7:30 pm | | Little Rock | L 87–89 ^{OT} | 1–5 | Farris Center (2,643); Conway, AR |
| Dec 1, 2016*; 6:30 pm | | at Southeast Missouri State | L 63–87 | 1–6 | Show Me Center (1,437); Cape Girardeau, MO |
| Dec 3, 2016*; 3:00 pm, FS2 | | at No. 18 Butler | L 58–82 | 1–7 | Hinkle Fieldhouse (7,117); Indianapolis, IN |
| Dec 10, 2016*; 3:00 pm | | at Little Rock | L 59–70 | 1–8 | Jack Stephens Center (3,044); Little Rock, AR |
| Dec 13, 2016*; 8:00 pm, BTN | | at Michigan | L 53–97 | 1–9 | Crisler Center (9,486); Ann Arbor, MI |
| Dec 16, 2016*; 7:00 pm | | Arkansas State | L 77–89 | 1–10 | Farris Center (1,942); Conway, AR |
| Dec 19, 2016*; 7:30 pm | | at Morehead State | L 85–111 | 1–11 | Ellis Johnson Arena (1,505); Morehead, KY |
| Dec 22, 2016*; 2:00 pm, P12N | | at Arizona State | L 62–98 | 1–12 | Wells Fargo Arena (4,479); Tempe, AZ |
Southland Conference regular season
| Dec 31, 2016; 4:00 pm | | Sam Houston State | W 67–65 | 2–12 (1–0) | Farris Center (612); Conway, AR |
| Jan 2, 2017; 8:00 pm | | Lamar | L 75–78 | 2–13 (1–1) | Farris Center (635); Conway, AR |
| Jan 5, 2017; 7:00 pm | | at Abilene Christian | W 81–76 | 3–13 (2–1) | Moody Coliseum (1,215); Abilene, TX |
| Jan 12, 2017; 7:00 pm, ASN | | at Houston Baptist | W 89–78 | 4–13 (3–1) | Sharp Gym (597); Houston, TX |
| Jan 14, 2017; 7:00 pm | | at Texas A&M–Corpus Christi | L 81–88 | 4–14 (3–2) | American Bank Center (1,223); Corpus Christi, TX |
| Jan 18, 2017; 7:00 pm | | at McNeese State | L 72–82 | 4–15 (3–3) | Burton Coliseum (307); Lake Charles, LA |
| Jan 21, 2017; 4:00 pm | | New Orleans | L 63–81 | 4–16 (3–4) | Farris Center (429); Conway, AR |
| Jan 25, 2017; 8:00 pm, ESPN3 | | at Stephen F. Austin | L 76–78 | 4–17 (3–5) | William R. Johnson Coliseum (3,612); Nacogdoches, TX |
| Jan 28, 2017; 4:00 pm | | Incarnate Word | L 80–81 | 4–18 (3–6) | Farris Center (538); Conway, AR |
| Feb 2, 2017; 7:00 pm | | Northwestern State | W 107–97 | 5–18 (4–6) | Farris Center (754); Conway, AR |
| Feb 4, 2017; 4:00 pm | | Southeastern Louisiana | W 68–66 | 6–18 (5–6) | Farris Center (742); Conway, AR |
| Feb 9, 2017; 7:00 pm | | Abilene Christian | W 84–73 | 7–18 (6–6) | Farris Center (958); Conway, AR |
| Feb 11, 2017; 4:00 pm | | Nicholls | W 106–83 | 8–18 (7–6) | Farris Center (1,845); Conway, AR |
| Feb 16, 2017; 6:30 pm | | at Nicholls | L 89–96 ^{OT} | 8–19 (7–7) | Stopher Gym (601); Thibodaux, LA |
| Feb 18, 2017; 4:00 pm | | at New Orleans | L 61–84 | 8–20 (7–8) | Lakefront Arena (812); New Orleans, LA |
| Feb 22, 2017; 7:30 pm | | at Southeastern Louisiana | L 70–87 | 8–21 (7–9) | University Center (837); Hammond, LA |
| Feb 25, 2017; 6:00 pm | | Stephen F. Austin | L 85–90 | 8–22 (7–10) | Farris Center (858); Conway, AR |
| Mar 4, 2017; 3:00 pm | | at Northwestern State | L 83–97 | 8–23 (7–11) | Prather Coliseum (1,523); Natchitoches, LA |
Southland tournament
| March 8, 2017; 5:00 pm, ESPN3 | (8) | vs. (5) Sam Houston State; First Round | L 69–77 | 8–24 | Merrell Center (1,127); Katy, TX |
*Non-conference game. ^{#}Rankings from AP Poll. (#) Tournament seedings in parentheses. All times are in Central Time Source.

== See also ==
- 2016–17 Central Arkansas Sugar Bears basketball team
