= 2016–17 Abilene Christian Wildcats men's basketball team =

American college basketball season

2016–17 Abilene Christian Wildcats men's basketball
- Conference: Southland Conference
- Record: 13–16 (7–11 Southland)
- Head coach: Joe Golding (6th season)
- Assistant coaches: Brette Tanner; Ted Crass; Antonio Bostic
- Home arena: Moody Coliseum (Capacity: 4,600)

2016–17 Southland Conference men's basketball standings
	Conf.				Overall
Team	W		L	PCT	W		L	PCT
New Orleans †	13	–	5	.722	20	–	12	.625
Texas A&M–CC	12	–	6	.667	24	–	12	.667
Houston Baptist	12	–	6	.667	17	–	14	.548
Stephen F. Austin	12	–	6	.667	18	–	15	.545
Sam Houston State	10	–	8	.556	21	–	13	.618
Lamar	10	–	8	.556	19	–	15	.559
Southeastern Louisiana	9	–	9	.500	16	–	16	.500
Nicholls State	7	–	11	.389	14	–	17	.452
Abilene Christian*	7	–	11	.389	13	–	16	.448
Northwestern State	7	–	11	.389	13	–	16	.448
Incarnate Word*	7	–	11	.389	12	–	17	.414
Central Arkansas	7	–	11	.389	8	–	24	.250
McNeese State	4	–	14	.222	7	–	22	.241
† 2017 Southland tournament winner * Ineligible for postseason during transition to Division I

The 2016–17 Abilene Christian Wildcats men's basketball team represented Abilene Christian University during the 2016–17 NCAA Division I men's basketball season. The Wildcats were led by sixth-year head coach Joe Golding and played their home games at the Moody Coliseum in Abilene, Texas as members of the Southland Conference. They finished the season 13–16, 7–11 in Southland play to finish in a five-way tie for eighth place.

The Wildcats, in their final year of a four-year transition from Division II to Division I, were not eligible for a postseason tournament including the Southland tournament, but were considered a Division I team for scheduling purposes and a Division I RPI member.

== Previous season ==
The Wildcats finished the 2015–16 season with a record of 13–18, 8–10 in Southland play to finish in seventh place.

== Roster ==
2016–17 Abilene Christian Wildcats men's basketball team
Players
Coaches

Pos.	#	Name	Height	Weight	Year	Previous school	Hometown
G	0	Jaylen Franklin	6 ft 2 in (1.88 m)	200 lb (91 kg)	So	Parkview HS	Jacksonville, AR
G/F	1	Jaren Lewis	6 ft 6 in (1.98 m)	230 lb (104 kg)	So	Lake Highland Prep	Orlando, FL
G	2	B. J. Maxwell	6 ft 4 in (1.93 m)	185 lb (84 kg)	RS Fr	Home School	Austin, TX
G	3	Diamante Langston	6 ft 2 in (1.88 m)	185 lb (84 kg)	Jr	South Plains College	Lewisville, TX
G	5	Payten Ricks	6 ft 2 in (1.88 m)	175 lb (79 kg)	Fr	Maize South HS	Wichita, KS
G	10	Isaiah Tripp	6 ft 1 in (1.85 m)	195 lb (88 kg)	Jr	Future College Prep	Baltimore, MD
G	11	Drake Green	6 ft 3 in (1.91 m)	190 lb (86 kg)	Jr	Clear Lake HS	Houston, TX
G	14	Trey Lenox	6 ft 3 in (1.91 m)	210 lb (95 kg)	Fr	Hot Springs HS	Hot Springs, AR
F	15	Hayden Farquhar	6 ft 7 in (2.01 m)	240 lb (109 kg)	So	Throckmorton HS	Throckmorton, TX
C	21	Jalone Friday	6 ft 9 in (2.06 m)	250 lb (113 kg)	RS Fr	Home School	Oklahoma City, OK
G	22	Jadon Reynolds	6 ft 1 in (1.85 m)	170 lb (77 kg)	So	Grace Prep Academy	Fort Worth, TX
F	23	Hayden Howell	6 ft 7 in (2.01 m)	235 lb (107 kg)	So	Carl Albert HS	Midwest City, OK
C	34	Kolton Kohl (redshirt)	7 ft 0 in (2.13 m)	210 lb (95 kg)	Fr	Central HS	San Angelo, TX

Head coach

- Joe Golding (Abilene Christian)

Assistant coach(es)

- Brette Tanner (Emporia State)
- Ted Crass (Little Rock)
- Antonio Bostic (Stephen F. Austin)

Legend

- (C) Team captain
- (S) Suspended
- (I) Ineligible
- (W) Walk-on
- Injured
- Current redshirt

Roster
Last update: February 8, 2017

== Schedule and results ==
Date time, TV	Opponent	Result	Record	Site (attendance) city, state
Non-conference regular season
November 11, 2016*; 7:00 p.m.	Schreiner	W 73–59	1–0	Moody Coliseum (1,750); Abilene, TX
November 17*; 6:00 pm	at New Hampshire	W 65–57	2–0	Lundholm Gym (473); Durham, NH
November 22*; 7:00 pm	Charleston Southern	L 65–66	2–1	Moody Coliseum (1,585); Abilene, TX
November 22*; 2:00 pm	at Oklahoma	L 64–72	2–2	Lloyd Noble Center (9,303); Norman, OK
November 27*; 4:00 pm	Howard Payne	W 71–55	3–2	Moody Coliseum (1,275); Abilene, TX
November 30*; 8:00 pm, RTRM	at New Mexico	L 55–64	3–3	The Pit (11,154); Albuquerque, NM
December 3*; 4:30 pm	at Charleston Southern	W 85–82	4–3	CSU Field House (671); North Charleston, SC
December 10*; 4:00 pm	Northern New Mexico	W 90–69	5–3	Moody Coliseum (1,122); Abilene, TX
December 14*; 7:00 pm	Randall	W 78–74	6–3	Moody Coliseum (750); Abilene, TX
December 17*; 9:00 pm	at Sacramento State	L 86–88 ^{OT}	6–4	Colberg Court (556); Sacramento, CA
December 19*; 9:00 pm	at San Francisco	L 51–86	6–5	War Memorial Gymnasium (1,163); San Francisco, CA
Southland regular season
December 29; 7:00 pm	at New Orleans	L 66–75	6–6 (0–1)	Lakefront Arena (608); New Orleans, LA
December 31; 2:00 pm	at Southeastern Louisiana	L 73–75	6–7 (0–2)	University Center (539); Hammond, LA
January 5, 2017; 7:00 pm	Central Arkansas	L 76–81	6–8 (0–3)	Moody Coliseum (1,215); Abilene, TX
January 7; 4:00 pm	Stephen F. Austin	W 69–60	7–8 (1–3)	Moody Coliseum (1,217); Abilene, TX
January 12; 7:30 pm	Southeastern Louisiana	L 50–56	7–9 (1–4)	Moody Coliseum (1,217); Abilene, TX
January 14; 4:00 pm	Lamar	L 64–67	8–9 (2–4)	Moody Coliseum (1,144); Abilene, TX
January 19; 4:30 pm	at Nicholls	L 59–62	8–10 (2–5)	Stopher Gym (1,468); Thibodaux, LA
January 26; 8:00 pm	at Incarnate Word	L 79–82	8–11 (2–6)	McDermott Center (1,177); San Antonio, TX
January 28; 7:00 pm	at Texas A&M–Corpus Christi	L 60–72	8–12 (2–7)	American Bank Center (1,857); Corpus Christi, TX
February 1; 7:00 pm	New Orleans	W 70–69 ^{OT}	9–12 (3–7)	Moody Coliseum (1,485); Abilene, TX
February 4; 4:00 pm	Sam Houston State	W 71–64	10–12 (4–7)	Moody Coliseum (1,249); Abilene, TX
February 9; 7:00 pm	at Central Arkansas	L 73–84	10–13 (4–8)	Farris Center (958); Conway, AR
February 11; 4:00 pm	Northwestern State	W 76–72	11–13 (5–8)	Moody Coliseum (1,271); Abilene, TX
February 16; 7:00 pm	at McNeese State	W 82–78	12–13 (6–8)	Burton Coliseum (434); Lake Charles, LA
February 22; 7:30 pm	Texas A&M–Corpus Christi	L 44–56	12–14 (6–9)	Moody Coliseum (1,227); Abilene, TX
February 25; 6:15 pm	at Sam Houston State	W 84–81	13–14 (7–9)	Bernard Johnson Coliseum (1,578); Huntsville, TX
March 1; 7:30 pm	Incarnate Word	L 75–89	13–15 (7–10)	Moody Coliseum (1,875); Abilene, TX
March 4; 7:00 pm	at Houston Baptist	L 72–81	13–16 (7–11)	Sharp Gymnasium (963); Houston, TX
*Non-conference game. ^{#}Rankings from AP Poll. (#) Tournament seedings in parentheses. All times are in Central Time.

== See also ==
- 2016–17 Abilene Christian Wildcats women's basketball team
