= 2017 Southland Conference men's basketball tournament =

- Classification: Division I
- Season: 2016–17
- Teams: 8
- Site: Merrell Center; Katy, Texas
- Champions: New Orleans (1st title)
- Winning coach: Mark Slessinger (1st title)
- MVP: Erik Thomas (New Orleans)
- Television: ESPN3, ESPN2

2016–17 Southland Conference men's basketball standings
	Conf.				Overall
Team	W		L	PCT	W		L	PCT
New Orleans †	13	–	5	.722	20	–	12	.625
Texas A&M–CC	12	–	6	.667	24	–	12	.667
Houston Baptist	12	–	6	.667	17	–	14	.548
Stephen F. Austin	12	–	6	.667	18	–	15	.545
Sam Houston State	10	–	8	.556	21	–	13	.618
Lamar	10	–	8	.556	19	–	15	.559
Southeastern Louisiana	9	–	9	.500	16	–	16	.500
Nicholls State	7	–	11	.389	14	–	17	.452
Abilene Christian*	7	–	11	.389	13	–	16	.448
Northwestern State	7	–	11	.389	13	–	16	.448
Incarnate Word*	7	–	11	.389	12	–	17	.414
Central Arkansas	7	–	11	.389	8	–	24	.250
McNeese State	4	–	14	.222	7	–	22	.241
* Ineligible for postseason during transition to Division I
† 2017 Southland tournament winner

The 2017 Southland Conference men's basketball tournament, was the postseason men's basketball tournament that completed 2016–17 season in the Southland Conference. The tournament was held at the Merrell Center in Katy, Texas from March 8–11, 2017. The winner of the tournament, New Orleans, received the conference's automatic bid to the NCAA tournament with a 68–65 OT win over Texas A&M-Corpus Christi.

Two programs in their final year of the transition from NCAA Division II to Division I, Abilene Christian and Incarnate Word, were ineligible for the tournament.

== Seeds ==
The top 8 teams in the conference qualified for the tournament. The top two seeds earned double byes into the semifinals in the merit-based format. The No. 3 and No. 4 seeds received single byes to the quarterfinals.

Teams were seeded by record within the conference, with a tiebreaker system to seed teams with identical conference records.

Seed	School	Conference	Tiebreaker 1	Tiebreaker 2
1	New Orleans	13–5		
2	Texas A&M–CC	12–6	2–0 vs. Incarnate Word	
3	Stephen F. Austin	12–6	1–1 vs. Incarnate Word	2–0 vs. Texas A&M-CC
4	Houston Baptist	12–6	1–1 vs. Incarnate Word	1–1 vs. Texas A&M-CC
5	Sam Houston State	10–8	1–0 vs. New Orleans	
6	Lamar	10–8	0–1 vs. New Orleans	
7	Southeastern Louisiana	9–9		
8	Central Arkansas	7–11	4–3 vs. UIW/Nicholls State/Northwestern State/ACU	1–1 vs. Northwestern State
N/A	Nicholls State	7–11	4–3 vs. UIW/Central Arkansas/Northwestern State/ACU	0–2 vs. Northwestern State
N/A	Northwestern State	7–11	3–3 vs. UIW/Central Arkansas/Nicholls State/ACU	

== Schedule ==
Session	Game	Time*	Matchup^{#}	Score	Television
First round – Wednesday, March 8, 2017
1	1	5:00 pm	No. 5 Sam Houston State vs. No. 8 Central Arkansas	77–69	ESPN3
1	2	7:30 pm	No. 6 Lamar vs. No. 7 Southeastern Louisiana	77–65	ESPN3
Quarterfinals – Thursday, March 9, 2017
2	3	5:00 pm	No. 4 Houston Baptist vs. No. 5 Sam Houston State	59–63	ESPN3
2	4	7:30 pm	No. 3 Stephen F. Austin vs. No. 6 Lamar	75–59	ESPN3
Semifinals – Friday, March 10, 2017
3	5	5:00 pm	No. 1 New Orleans vs. No. 5 Sam Houston State	75–63	ESPN3
3	6	7:30 pm	No. 2 Texas A&M Corpus Christi vs. No. 3 Stephen F. Austin	77–69	ESPN3
Championship – Saturday, March 11, 2017
4	7	8:30 pm	No. 1 New Orleans vs. No. 2 Texas A&M Corpus Christi	68–65 ^{OT}	ESPN2
*Game times in CST. #-Rankings denote tournament seeding.

== Bracket ==
First round Wednesday, March 8 ESPN3
5	Sam Houston State	77
8	Central Arkansas	69
6	Lamar	77
7	SE Louisiana	65

Quarterfinals; Thursday, March 9 ESPN3
4	Houston Baptist	59
5	Sam Houston State	63
3	Stephen F. Austin	75
6	Lamar	59

Semifinals; Friday, March 10; ESPN3
1	New Orleans	75
5	Sam Houston State	63
2	Texas A&M–CC	77
3	Stephen F. Austin	69

Championship; Saturday, March 11; ESPN2
1	New Orleans	68*
2	Texas A&M–CC	65

* – denotes overtime period

== Game summaries ==
=== First round ===
ESPN3

03/09/2017
5:00 pm

Central Arkansas 69, Sam Houston State 77
Scoring by half: 35–49, 34–28
Pts: M. Kamba – 21; Rebs: D. Brooks – 10; Asts: J. Howard – 3	Pts: D. Henderson – 16; Rebs: C. Galbreath Jr. – 9 Asts: P. Baxter – 4

Merrell Center
Katy, TX
Referees: Rob Wolff, Rodrick Dixon, Dave Cusick

ESPN3

03/09/2017
7:30 pm

SE Louisiana 65, Lamar 77
Scoring by half: 30–34, 35–43
Pts: M. Veal – 16; Rebs: D. Hayes – 6 Asts: M. Veal – 5 D. Cook – 13 Pts	Pts: N. Garth – 17; Rebs: C. Weisbrod – 9 Asts: 2 Tied – 3 Z. Bosha – 6 Reb

Merrell Center
Katy, TX
Attendance: 1,127
Referees: Danny Chance, Ross Cullins, Owen Shortt

=== Quarterfinals ===
ESPN3

03/10/2017
5:00 pm

Sam Houston State 63, Houston Baptist 59
Scoring by half: 28–26, 35–33
Pts: C. Galbreath Jr. – 15; Rebs: C. Galbreath Jr. – 10; Asts: J. Dewey III – 4 J. Dewey III – 14 Pts, 6 Reb	Pts: J. Ibarra – 16; Rebs: J. Ibarra – 9 Asts: B. Bonds – 4 R. Chukwujekwu – 14 Pts, 6 Reb

Merrell Center
Katy, TX
Referees: Rodrick Dixon, Jeff Malham, Roger Schmitz

ESPN3

03/10/2017
7:30 pm

Lamar 59, Stephen F. Austin 75
Scoring by half: 25–39, 34–36
Pts: T. Noel – 14; Rebs: 3 Tied – 3 Asts: N. Garth – 4 J. Frenchwood – 11 Pts	Pts: L. Gilmore III – 19; Rebs: T. Holyfield – 8 Asts: 2 Tied – 4 L. Gilmore III – 7 Reb

Merrell Center
Katy, TX
Attendance: 1,756
Referees: James Durham, Patrick Boeh, Kerby Sitton

=== Semifinals ===
ESPN3

03/11/2017
5:00 pm

Sam Houston State 63, New Orleans 75
Scoring by half: 25–39, 38–36
Pts: D. Henderson – 16; Rebs: T. Butler – 13; Asts: J. Dewey III – 4 C. Galbreath Jr. – 11 Pts, 4 Reb	Pts: E. Thomas – 18; Rebs: M. Puou – 7 Asts: E. Thomas – 3 C. Gill – 15 Pts

Merrell Center
Katy, TX
Referees: Kerry Sitton, Brooks Wells, Chance Moore

ESPN3

03/11/2017
7:30 pm

Stephen F. Austin 69, Texas A&M–Corpus Christi 77
Scoring by half: 29–42, 40–35
Pts: L. Gilmore III – 20; Rebs: L. Gilmore III – 10; Asts: D. Cameron – 4 T. Holyfield – 8 Reb	Pts: R. Thomas – 27; Rebs: R. Thomas – 9 Asts: 3 Tied – 3; 2 Tied – 3 Stls

Merrell Center
Katy, TX
Attendance: 2,318
Referees: Brent Dugas, Gerald Williams, Kelly Hunt

=== Championship ===
ESPN2

03/12/2017
8:30 pm

Texas A&M–Corpus Christi 65, New Orleans 68 (OT)
Scoring by half: 33–26, 27–34, 5–8
Pts: R. Thomas – 22; Rebs: R. Thomas – 8 Asts: 2 Tied – 4 C. Martinez – 15 Pts	Pts: T. Broyles – 15; Rebs: E. Thomas – 11; Asts: E. Thomas – 3 T. Thibodeaux 8 Pts, 8 Reb

Merrell Center
Katy, TX
Attendance: 2,068
Referees: Brent Meaux, Marques Pettigrew, Rod Dixon

== Awards and honors ==
Tournament MVP:

All-Tournament Team:

== See also ==
2017 Southland Conference women's basketball tournament
