= 2016–17 Sam Houston State Bearkats men's basketball team =

American college basketball season

2016–17 Sam Houston State Bearkats men's basketball
- Conference: Southland Conference
- Record: 21–13 (10–8 Southland)
- Head coach: Jason Hooten (7th season)
- Assistant coaches: Chris Mudge (7th season); Jimmy Smith (1st season); Chuck Taylor (1st season)
- Home arena: Bernard Johnson Coliseum (Capacity: 6,110)

2016–17 Southland Conference men's basketball standings
	Conf.				Overall
Team	W		L	PCT	W		L	PCT
New Orleans †	13	–	5	.722	20	–	12	.625
Texas A&M–CC	12	–	6	.667	24	–	12	.667
Houston Baptist	12	–	6	.667	17	–	14	.548
Stephen F. Austin	12	–	6	.667	18	–	15	.545
Sam Houston State	10	–	8	.556	21	–	13	.618
Lamar	10	–	8	.556	19	–	15	.559
Southeastern Louisiana	9	–	9	.500	16	–	16	.500
Nicholls State	7	–	11	.389	14	–	17	.452
Abilene Christian*	7	–	11	.389	13	–	16	.448
Northwestern State	7	–	11	.389	13	–	16	.448
Incarnate Word*	7	–	11	.389	12	–	17	.414
Central Arkansas	7	–	11	.389	8	–	24	.250
McNeese State	4	–	14	.222	7	–	22	.241
† 2017 Southland tournament winner * Ineligible for postseason during transition to Division I

The 2016–17 Sam Houston State Bearkats men's basketball team represented Sam Houston State University during the 2016–17 NCAA Division I men's basketball season. The Bearkats, led by seventh-year head coach Jason Hooten, played their home games at the Bernard Johnson Coliseum in Huntsville, Texas as members of the Southland Conference. They finished the season 21–13, 10–8 in Southland play to finish in a tie for fifth place. They defeated Central Arkansas and Houston Baptist to advance to the semifinals of the Southland tournament where they lost to New Orleans. Despite having 21 wins, they did not participate in a postseason tournament.

== Previous season ==
The Bearkats finished the 2015–16 season 18–16, 12–6 in Southland play to finish in a tie for third place. They defeated Nicholls State in the quarterfinals of the Southland tournament to advance to the semifinals where they lost to Texas A&M–Corpus Christi. They were invited to the CollegeInsider.com Tournament where they lost in the first round to Jackson State.

== Roster ==
2016–17 Sam Houston State Bearkats men's basketball team
Players
Coaches

Pos.	#	Name	Height	Weight	Year	Previous school	Hometown
G/F	0	Albert Almanza	6 ft 6 in (1.98 m)	195 lb (88 kg)	Fr	Saint Stephens	Austin, TX
G	1	Ameer Jackson	6 ft 4 in (1.93 m)	185 lb (84 kg)	Jr	Evelyn Mack Academy/Dodge CC	Concord, NC
G	2	Cameron Delaney	6 ft 4 in (1.93 m)	200 lb (91 kg)	So	Harker Heights/Denver	Harker Heights, TX
G	3	Dakrai Henderson	6 ft 2 in (1.88 m)	192 lb (87 kg)	So	Dawson HS	Pearland, TX
G	4	Jovante Spivey	6 ft 0 in (1.83 m)	165 lb (75 kg)	RS Jr	Savannah/South Georgia St	Savannah, GA
F	5	Jesse Lopez	6 ft 7 in (2.01 m)	205 lb (93 kg)	So	Bowie	El Paso, TX
G	11	Jalin Barnes	6 ft 1 in (1.85 m)	180 lb (82 kg)	Jr	Christian Faith/Barton County CC	Raleigh, NC
F/C	13	Aurimas Majauskas	6 ft 8 in (2.03 m)	228 lb (103 kg)	Jr	Future Prep	Marijampolė, Lithuania
G	15	Josh Delaney	6 ft 0 in (1.83 m)	173 lb (78 kg)	RS Fr	Harker Heights HS	Killeen, TX
G	20	Jamal Williams	6 ft 4 in (1.93 m)	190 lb (86 kg)	So	Episcopal HS	Houston, TX
G	21	Paul Baxter	6 ft 2 in (1.88 m)	205 lb (93 kg)	Sr	Bowie HS	Austin, TX
C	23	Andre Sands	6 ft 81 in (3.89 m)	242 lb (110 kg)	Jr	Bel Air - Kansas/Sun Rise Christian	Freeport, Bahamas
C	33	Marc Andre Fortin	6 ft 9 in (2.06 m)	230 lb (104 kg)	Fr	Cegep De Sainte-Foy	Quebec City, Quebec Canada

Head coach

- Jason Hooten (Tarleton State)

Assistant coach(es)

- Chris Mudge (Texas)
- Jimmy Smith (Mary Hardin–Baylor)
- Chuck Taylor (Wayne State (MI))

Legend

- (C) Team captain
- (S) Suspended
- (I) Ineligible
- (W) Walk-on
- Injured
- Current redshirt

Roster
Last update: September 29, 2017

== Schedule and results ==
Date time, TV	Rank^{#}	Opponent^{#}	Result	Record	Site (attendance) city, state
Non-conference regular season
November 12, 2016*; 2:00 pm		LeTourneau	W 104–57	1–0	Bernard Johnson Coliseum; Huntsville, TX
November 14, 2016*; 7:00 pm		at Ohio	L 75–96	1–1	Convocation Center (6,669); Athens, OH
November 17, 2016*; 6:30 pm		Southern	W 91–83	2–1	Bernard Johnson Coliseum (1,116); Huntsville, TX
November 20, 2016*; 2:00 pm		at Tennessee Tech	W 78–71	3–1	Eblen Center (768); Cookeville, TN
November 22, 2016*; 6:30 pm		at Georgia Tech	L 73–81	3–2	Hank McCamish Pavilion (4,181); Atlanta, GA
November 25, 2016*; 6:30 pm		Idaho	W 69–62	4–2	Bernard Johnson Coliseum (625); Huntsville, TX
November 30, 2016*; 8:00 pm		at No. 9 Baylor	L 45–79	4–3	Ferrell Center (5,029); Waco, TX
December 3, 2016*; 6:30 pm		LSU–Shreveport	W 91–59	5–3	Bernard Johnson Coliseum (856); Huntsville, TX
December 10, 2016*; 1:00 pm		at Southern Illinois	W 79–73	6–3	SIU Arena (4,278); Carbondale, IL
December 13, 2016*; 6:30 pm		Sul Ross	W 78–57	7–3	Bernard Johnson Coliseum (498); Huntsville, TX
December 17, 2016*; 6:30 pm		North Texas	W 76–70	8–3	Bernard Johnson Coliseum (763); Huntsville, TX
December 19, 2016*; 6:30 pm		Randall	W 119–81	9–3	Bernard Johnson Coliseum (691); Huntsville, TX
December 22, 2016*; 7:00 pm, SECN		vs. Arkansas	L 56–90	9–4	Verizon Arena (12,153); North Little Rock, AR
Southland Conference regular season
December 29, 2016; 6:30 pm		Houston Baptist	L 65–79	9–5 (0–1)	Bernard Johnson Coliseum (860); Huntsville, TX
December 31, 2016; 5:00 pm		at Central Arkansas	L 65–67	9–6 (0–2)	Farris Center (612); Conway, AR
January 5, 2017; 7:30 pm		at McNeese State	W 74–67	10–6 (1–2)	Burton Coliseum (722); Lake Charles, LA
January 7, 2017; 6:15 pm		Nicholls	W 74–61	11–6 (2–2)	Bernard Johnson Coliseum (678); Huntsville, TX
January 12, 2017; 7:45 pm		at New Orleans	W 70–68	12–6 (3–2)	Lakefront Arena (721); New Orleans, LA
January 14, 2017; 3:00 pm		at Northwestern State	W 77–68	13–6 (4–2)	Prather Coliseum (1,316); Natchitoches, LA
January 19, 2017; 6:30 pm		Lamar	W 87–65	14–6 (5–2)	Bernard Johnson Coliseum (1,071); Huntsville, TX
January 21, 2017; 6:15 pm		Texas A&M–Corpus Christi	W 76–62	15–6 (6–2)	Bernard Johnson Coliseum (1,340); Huntsville, TX
January 28, 2017; 6:15 pm		Southeastern Louisiana	W 71–69	16–6 (7–2)	Bernard Johnson Coliseum (1,265); Huntsville, TX
February 2, 2017; 7:30 pm		Stephen F. Austin	W 72–63	17–6 (8–2)	Bernard Johnson Coliseum (3,034); Huntsville, TX
February 4, 2017; 7:00 pm		at Abilene Christian	L 64–71	17–7 (8–3)	Moody Coliseum (1,249); Abilene, TX
February 9, 2017; 7:30 pm, ESPN3		at Lamar	L 76–80 ^{OT}	17–8 (8–4)	Montagne Center (2,538); Beaumont, TX
February 11, 2017; 6:15 pm, ESPN3		Incarnate Word	W 72–63	18–8 (9–4)	Bernard Johnson Coliseum (1,634); Huntsville, TX
February 16, 2017; 7:00 pm		at Houston Baptist	L 77–88	18–9 (9–5)	Sharp Gym (872); Houston, TX
February 18, 2017; 7:00 pm		at Incarnate Word	L 53–69	18–10 (9–6)	McDermott Center (1,068); San Antonio, TX
February 25, 2017; 6:15 pm		Abilene Christian	L 81–84	18–11 (9–7)	Bernard Johnson Coliseum (1,578); Huntsville, TX
March 2, 2017; 8:00 pm		McNeese State	W 79–74	19–11 (10–7)	Bernard Johnson Coliseum (1,253); Huntsville, TX
March 4, 2017; 6:00 pm, ESPN3		at Stephen F. Austin	L 56–64	19–12 (10–8)	William R. Johnson Coliseum (5,938); Nacogdoches, TX
Southland tournament
March 8, 2017; 5:00 pm, ESPN3	(5)	vs. (8) Central Arkansas; First Round	W 77–69	20–12	Merrell Center (1,127); Katy, TX
March 9, 2017; 5:00 pm, ESPN3	(5)	vs. (4) Houston Baptist; Quarterfinals	W 63–59	21–12	Merrell Center (1,756); Katy, TX
March 10, 2017; 5:00 pm, ESPN3	(5)	vs. (1) New Orleans; Semifinals	L 63–75	21–13	Merrell Center (2,318); Katy, TX
*Non-conference game. (#) Tournament seedings in parentheses. All times are in Central Time.

== See also ==
- 2016–17 Sam Houston State Bearkats women's basketball team
