= 2016–17 Southeastern Louisiana Lions basketball team =

American college basketball season

2016–17 Southeastern Louisiana Lions basketball
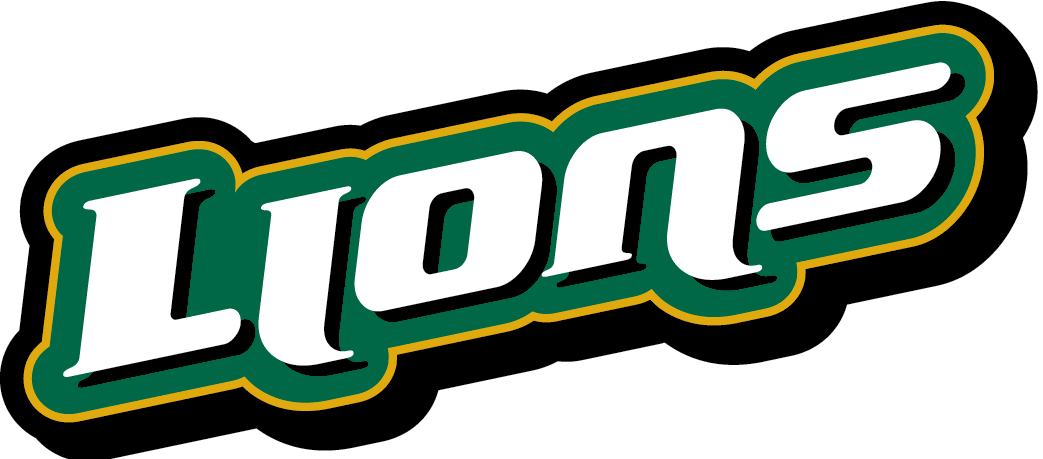
- Conference: Southland Conference
- Record: 16–16 (9–9 Southland)
- Head coach: Jay Ladner (3rd season)
- Assistant coaches: David Kiefer; Joey Stiebing; Odell Witherspoon III
- Home arena: University Center (Capacity: 7,500)

2016–17 Southland Conference men's basketball standings
	Conf.				Overall
Team	W		L	PCT	W		L	PCT
New Orleans †	13	–	5	.722	20	–	12	.625
Texas A&M–CC	12	–	6	.667	24	–	12	.667
Houston Baptist	12	–	6	.667	17	–	14	.548
Stephen F. Austin	12	–	6	.667	18	–	15	.545
Sam Houston State	10	–	8	.556	21	–	13	.618
Lamar	10	–	8	.556	19	–	15	.559
Southeastern Louisiana	9	–	9	.500	16	–	16	.500
Nicholls State	7	–	11	.389	14	–	17	.452
Abilene Christian*	7	–	11	.389	13	–	16	.448
Northwestern State	7	–	11	.389	13	–	16	.448
Incarnate Word*	7	–	11	.389	12	–	17	.414
Central Arkansas	7	–	11	.389	8	–	24	.250
McNeese State	4	–	14	.222	7	–	22	.241
† 2017 Southland tournament winner * Ineligible for postseason during transition to Division I

The 2016–17 Southeastern Louisiana Lions basketball team represented Southeastern Louisiana University during the 2016–17 NCAA Division I men's basketball season. The Lions, led by third-year head coach Jay Ladner, played their home games at the University Center in Hammond, Louisiana as members of the Southland Conference. They finished the season 16–16, 9–9 in Southland play to finish in seventh place. They lost in the first round of the Southland tournament to Lamar.

== Previous season ==
The Lions finished the 2015–16 season 12–21, 9–9 in Southland play to finish in sixth place. They defeated New Orleans in the first round of the Southland tournament before losing to Houston Baptist in the quarterfinals.

== Roster ==
2016–17 Southeastern Louisiana Lions men's basketball team
Players
Coaches

Pos.	#	Name	Height	Weight	Year	Previous school	Hometown
G	0	Marlain Veal	5 ft 9 in (1.75 m)	145 lb (66 kg)	So	Helen Cox HS	New Orleans, LA
F	1	Jordan Capps	6 ft 7 in (2.01 m)	220 lb (100 kg)	Sr	Peachtree Ridge HS; Northwest Florida State College	Norcross, GA
G	2	Dimi Cook	6 ft 2 in (1.88 m)	183 lb (83 kg)	RS So	Gulfport HS	Gulfport, MS
G	3	Joshua Filmore	6 ft 0 in (1.83 m)	175 lb (79 kg)	Sr	Wekiva HS	Orlando, FL
G/F	4	Davon Hayes	6 ft 6 in (1.98 m)	198 lb (90 kg)	Jr	St. Stanislaus College; Northeast Mississippi CC; Southern Miss	Portsmouth, VA
G	5	Jabbar Singleton	5 ft 11 in (1.8 m)	190 lb (86 kg)	RS Jr	Brother Martin HS; Oral Roberts	New Orleans, LA
	10	Eddy Polanco	6 ft 3 in (1.91 m)	195 lb (88 kg)	Jr	Wheels HS; College of Central Florida	Bronx, New York
SG	11	Chris Mejia	6 ft 3 in (1.91 m)	190 lb (86 kg)	Fr	Mater Academy	Hialeah Gardens, FL
PG	12	Michael Corchiani	6 ft 0 in (1.83 m)	185 lb (84 kg)	Fr	Metairie Park Country Day HS	Metairie, LA
F	13	Moses Greenwood	6 ft 7 in (2.01 m)	221 lb (100 kg)	So	Velma Jackson HS	Sharon, MS
C	15	Dominic Nelson	6 ft 10 in (2.08 m)	250 lb (113 kg)	Sr	Wings Academy; Southwest Tennessee CC	Harlem, NY
SF	20	Brandon Gonzalez	6 ft 6 in (1.98 m)	200 lb (91 kg)	Fr	Charlotte HS	Punta Gorda, FL
G	22	George Brock	5 ft 11 in (1.8 m)	160 lb (73 kg)	Jr	McDonogh 35; Dodge City CC College	New Orleans, LA
F	23	James Currington	6 ft 7 in (2.01 m)	195 lb (88 kg)	RS Jr	Paul W. Bryant HS; Mississippi Valley State	Tuscaloosa, AL
G	24	Keith Charleston	6 ft 8 in (2.03 m)	207 lb (94 kg)	Sr	Jacksonville HS; Northwest Florida State College	Little Rock, AR

Head coach

- Jay Ladner

Assistant coach(es)

- David Kiefer
- Joey Stiebing
- Odell Witherspoon III

Legend

- (C) Team captain
- (S) Suspended
- (I) Ineligible
- (W) Walk-on
- Injured
- Current redshirt

Roster
Last update: September 27, 2016

== Schedule and results ==
Date time, TV	Rank^{#}	Opponent^{#}	Result	Record	Site (attendance) city, state
Exhibition
October 26, 2016*; 7:00 pm		Southern–New Orleans	W 81–53		University Center (764); Hammond, LA
November 2, 2016*; 7:00 pm		LSU–Alexandria	W 59–53		University Center; Hammond, LA
Non-conference regular season
November 11, 2016*; 7:00 pm		Millsaps	W 85–39	1–0	University Center (930); Hammond, LA
November 14, 2016*; 7:00 pm, ESPN3		at Tulane	L 76–93	1–1	Devlin Fieldhouse (1,239); New Orleans, LA
November 16, 2016*; 7:30 pm		Jackson State	W 84–71	2–1	University Center (907); Hammond, LA
November 21, 2016*; 7:00 pm		Xavier (LA)	W 89–72	3–1	University Center (696); Hammond, LA
November 23, 2016*; 8:00 pm		at UTEP	W 72–56	4–1	Don Haskins Center (6,348); El Paso, TX
November 25, 2016*; 3:00 pm, MWN		at Colorado State	L 59–67	4–2	Moby Arena (3,381); Fort Collins, CO
November 27, 2016*; 7:00 pm, PAC-12 Network		at California; California Bears Classic	L 55–67	4–3	Haas Pavilion (8,387); Berkeley, CA
November 30, 2016*; 7:00 pm		Maryland Eastern Shore; California Bears Classic	W 85–75	5–3	University Center (866); Hammond, LA
December 3, 2016*; 6:00 pm		at Louisiana Tech	L 59–88	5–4	Thomas Assembly Center (2,764); Ruston, LA
December 12, 2016*; 7:00 pm		Florida A&M	W 108–69	6–4	University Center (488); Hammond, LA
December 17, 2016*; 6:00 pm, ESPN3		at Toledo	L 56–78	6–5	Savage Arena (3,474); Toledo, OH
December 20, 2016*; 7:00 pm, CUSA.tv		at North Texas	L 65–71	6–6	UNT Coliseum (1,707); Denton, TX
December 28, 2016*; 7:00 pm		at Southern	W 64–53	7–6	F. G. Clark Center (328); Baton Rouge, LA
Southland regular season
December 31, 2016; 2:00 pm		Abilene Christian	W 75–53	8–6 (1–0)	University Center (539); Hammond, LA
January 2, 2017; 2:00 pm		Incarnate Word	W 74–63	9–6 (2–0)	University Center (552); Hammond, LA
January 5, 2017; 7:00 pm		at Houston Baptist	L 74–81	9–7 (2–1)	Sharp Gym (761); Houston, TX
January 7, 2017; 5:30 pm, ESPN3		at Lamar	L 54–74	9–8 (2–2)	Montagne Center (1,988); Beaumont, TX
January 12, 2017; 7:30 pm		at Abilene Christian	W 56–50	10–8 (3–2)	Moody Coliseum (1,217); Abilene, TX
January 15, 2017; 3:00 pm		at McNeese State	W 79–75	11–8 (4–2)	Burton Coliseum (1,353); Lake Charles, LA
January 21, 2017; 5:00 pm		Houston Baptist	W 83–71	12–8 (5–2)	University Center (674); Hammond, LA
January 25, 2017; 7:30 pm		Northwestern State	L 71–85	12–9 (5–3)	University Center (1,241); Hammond, LA
January 28, 2017; 6:15 pm		at Sam Houston State	L 69–71	12–10 (5–4)	Bernard Johnson Coliseum (1,265); Huntsville, TX
February 1, 2017; 7:30 pm		Nicholls	W 72–44	13–10 (6–4)	University Center (1,125); Hammond, LA
February 4, 2017; 4:00 pm		at Central Arkansas	L 66–68	13–11 (6–5)	Farris Center (742); Conway, AR
February 8, 2017; 7:00 pm		at Texas A&M–Corpus Christi	L 75–80	13–12 (6–6)	American Bank Center (1,373); Corpus Christi, TX
February 11, 2017; 5:45 pm, ESPN3		New Orleans	L 52–60	13–13 (6–7)	University Center (708); Hammond, LA
February 16, 2017; 8:00 pm		at Northwestern State	W 73–66	14–13 (7–7)	Prather Coliseum (1,711); Natchitoches, LA
February 18, 2017; 5:00 pm		Stephen F. Austin	L 52–60	14–14 (7–8)	University Center (641); Hammond, LA
February 22, 2017; 7:30 pm		Central Arkansas	W 87–70	15–14 (8–8)	University Center (837); Hammond, LA
February 25, 2017; 3:30 pm		at Nicholls	L 71–77	15–15 (8–9)	Stopher Gym (338); Thibodaux, LA
March 2, 2017; 7:45 pm		at New Orleans	W 63–58	16–15 (9–9)	Lakefront Arena (1,302); New Orleans, LA
Southland tournament
March 8, 2017; 7:30 pm, ESPN3	(7)	vs. (6) Lamar; First Round	L 65–77	16–16	Merrell Center (1,127); Katy, TX
*Non-conference game. ^{#}Rankings from AP Poll. (#) Tournament seedings in parentheses. All times are in Central Time.

== See also ==
- 2016–17 Southeastern Louisiana Lady Lions basketball team
