= Wesley Chapel High School =

Location
- 30651 Wells Road; Wesley Chapel, Florida 33545; United States
- Coordinates: 28.255328°N 82.310057°W

Information
- Other name: WCHS
- Type: Public high school
- Established: August 16, 1999; 26 years ago
- School district: Pasco County Schools
- NCES School ID: 120153003650
- Principal: Matt McDermott
- Teaching staff: 88.40 (on an FTE basis)
- Grades: 9–12
- Enrollment: 1,886 (2023-2024)
- Student to teacher ratio: 21.33
- Colors: Navy and white
- Mascot: Wesley The Wildcat
- Nickname: Wildcats
- Newspaper: Paw Prints
- Website: wchs.pasco.k12.fl.us

Wesley Chapel High School (WCHS) is a public high school in Wesley Chapel, Florida, United States. It is part of the Pasco County Schools district. The school opened on August 16, 1999.

As of 2019, it is ranked 186th in Florida and 3,757th nationally. The graduation rate lists at 91%. Students have the opportunity to take Advanced Placement coursework and exams. The AP participation rate at the school is 47%. The total minority enrollment is 47%, and 46% of students are economically disadvantaged.

== Notable alumni ==
- Erik Thomas, professional basketball power forward for the Astros de Jalisco.
- Greg Jenkins, professional american football wide receiver.
- Tre' McKitty, NFL tight end for the Cleveland Browns.
