= Mark Slessinger =

American basketball coach (born 1974)

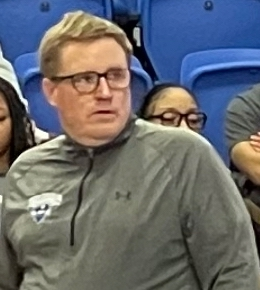
- Slessinger in 2023

Current position
- Title: Associate head coach
- Team: Indiana State
- Conference: MVC

Biographical details
- Born: May 2, 1974 (age 52); Bloomington, Indiana, U.S.

Playing career
- 1991–1994: Aurora
- Position: Point guard

Coaching career (HC unless noted)
- 1995–1996: Aurora (assistant)
- 1996–1997: Central Michigan (assistant)
- 1997–1999: Northland Pioneer
- 1999–2011: Northwestern State (assistant)
- 2011–2024: New Orleans
- 2024–present: Indiana State (associate HC)

Head coaching record
- Overall: 171–222 (college); 36–25 (junior college)
- Tournaments: 0–1 (NCAA Division I); 1–1 (CBI); 0–1 (CIT); 0–1 (TBC)

Accomplishments and honors

Championships
- Southland regular season (2017); Southland tournament (2017)

Awards
- Southland Coach of the Year (2017)

Mark Edward Slessinger (born May 2, 1974) is an American college basketball coach who is currently the associate head coach at Indiana State University. Previously, he was the men's basketball head coach at the University of New Orleans. Under Slessinger, New Orleans won over 160 games, with two Southland Conference titles and an NCAA Tournament appearance in the 2016–17 season.

== Early life and education ==
Born in Bloomington, Indiana, Slessinger grew up in nearby Ellettsville and graduated from Edgewood High School in 1992. Slessinger attended Aurora University, where he played both basketball (three seasons) and soccer (four seasons) before graduating with a bachelor's degree in physical education in 1996.

== Coaching career ==
=== Early coaching career (1995–2011) ===
While completing his college degree, Slessinger was an assistant coach for Aurora in 1995–96. He then got his first NCAA Division I job in 1996 as an assistant coach at Central Michigan under Leonard Drake.

From 1997 to 2000, Slessinger worked at Northland Pioneer College, a junior college in Arizona. After one season as an assistant coach, Slessinger was head coach from 1998 to 2000, going 19–12 in 1998–99 and 17–13 in 1999–2000.

In July 2000, Slessinger returned to the NCAA Division I level as assistant coach and recruiting coordinator at Northwestern State under Mike McConathy. Slessinger would remain at Northwestern State for 11 seasons, during which the team twice qualified for the NCAA Tournament and won three Southland Conference championships.

=== New Orleans (2011–2024) ===
Slessinger became the 12th head coach in the history of the New Orleans program on June 28, 2011. With Slessinger at the helm, the Privateers re-integrated into full time Division I status for athletics, despite budget challenges following Hurricane Katrina. In 2013-14 New Orleans became a member of the Southland Conference, and in just its fourth full season, won both the regular season championship and conference tournament championship in 2016–17.

With the conference tournament championship in March 2017, Slessinger ended a 21-year NCAA tournament drought and earned the program's first NCAA berth since 1996. In addition to the NCAA tournament appearance, Slessinger also received several individual awards for the 2016–17 season. Slessinger was named the Southland Conference Coach of the Year. The award was voted on by other conference head coaches after New Orleans was the preseason 9th place pick and then won the conference outright with a 13–5 record. Slessinger also received the prestigious Eddie Robinson Award in the summer of 2017. The award is sponsored by the New Orleans Sports Hall of Fame and recognizes outstanding achievements in athletics, academics, and citizenship to a member of the Louisiana sports community. Slessinger was also named Coach of the Year by the Louisiana Writers' Association and the Louisiana Basketball Coaches Association. Following the season, he received a new seven-year contract with the team.

On April 19, 2024, Slessinger left UNO after 13 seasons to become associate head coach at Indiana State under new head coach Matthew Graves.

== Head coaching record ==
=== College ===
Record table
Season	Team	Overall	Conference	Standing	Postseason
New Orleans Privateers (NCAA Division I independent) (2011–2013)
2011–12	New Orleans	17–15			
2012–13	New Orleans	8–18			
New Orleans Privateers (Southland Conference) (2013–2024)
2013–14	New Orleans	11–15	8–10	6th	
2014–15	New Orleans	11–18	6–12	T–8th	
2015–16	New Orleans	10–20	6–12	T–8th	
2016–17	New Orleans	20–12	13–5	1st	NCAA Division I First Four
2017–18	New Orleans	16–17	11–7	T–4th	CBI quarterfinal
2018–19	New Orleans	19–14	12–6	T–3rd	CIT first round
2019–20	New Orleans	9–21	5–15	T–9th	
2020–21	New Orleans	10–15	8–7	T–5th	
2021–22	New Orleans	18–14	10–4	T–2nd	TBC first round
2022–23	New Orleans	12–20	7–11	T–6th	
2023–24	New Orleans	10–23	4–14	T–8th	
New Orleans:		171–222 (.435)	90–103 (.466)		
Total:		171–222 (.435)			
National champion Postseason invitational champion Conference regular season champion Conference regular season and conference tournament champion Division regular season champion Division regular season and conference tournament champion Conference tournament champion
