= Baytown Christian Academy =

Location
- Coordinates: 29.7853°N 94.9653°W

Information
- Type: Private
- Founded: 1979
- NCES School ID: 02061312
- Faculty: 32.1
- Enrollment: 225 (2016)
- Website: www.gobca.org
- Last updated: 8 January 2018

Baytown Christian Academy is a private Christian primary and secondary school located in Baytown, Texas. The school's administrative offices and campus are together. The school was established in 1979.

== History ==
Previously, the main campus only had grades 4-12, while the campus for PK-3 through 3rd grades was located at Baker Road Baptist Church in Baytown.

== Athletics ==
Baytown Christian Academy has a six-man football team.
