= Erik Thomas (basketball) =

Argentine basketball player (born 1995)

No. 4 – Soles de Mexicali
- Position: Small forward
- League: LNBP

Personal information
- Born: January 16, 1995 (age 31) Paraná, Entre Ríos, Argentina
- Listed height: 6 ft 5 in (1.96 m)
- Listed weight: 215 lb (98 kg)

Career information
- High school: Wesley Chapel (Wesley Chapel, Florida)
- College: East Georgia State (2013–2014); Baton Rouge CC (2014–2015); New Orleans (2015–2017)
- NBA draft: 2017: undrafted
- Playing career: 2017–present

Career history
- 2017–2018: Regatas Corrientes
- 2019: Libertad
- 2019–2020: Ferro Carril Oeste
- 2020: Soles de Mexicali
- 2020–2021: Club Athletico Paulistano
- 2021: Soles de Mexicali
- 2021–2022: Brasília Basquete
- 2022: Abejas de León
- 2022–2023: Lions de Genève
- 2023: Astros de Jalisco
- 2024: Soles de Mexicali
- 2025–2026: Panteras de Aguascalientes
- 2026: Guangzhou Loong Lions
- 2026: Nacional
- 2026–present: Soles de Mexicali

Career highlights
- LNBP champion (2022); AP Honorable Mention All-American (2017); Southland Player of the Year (2017); First-team All-Southland (2017); Southland tournament MVP (2017)

Erik Thomas (born January 16, 1995) is an Argentine basketball player for Soles de Mexicali of the Liga Nacional de Baloncesto Profesional (LNBP). He played college basketball for the New Orleans Privateers, where in 2017 he was named the Southland Conference Player of the Year.

Thomas was born in Paraná, Entre Ríos to an American professional basketball player and an Argentine mother. He starred at Wesley Chapel High School in Florida, where he was named the state Class A Player of the Year as a senior. He was lightly recruited due to his small size for a power forward and a torn ligament in his ankle, so he opted for junior college, enrolling first at East Georgia State College and then at Baton Rouge Community College. He ultimately committed to New Orleans to finish his college career. Thomas started for two seasons, and in 2016–17 he averaged 19.3 points and 7.8 rebounds per game, leading the Privateers to a Southland Conference championship and earning Southland Player of the Year honors.

Thomas spent the 2019–20 season with Ferro Carril Oeste of the Liga Nacional de Básquet, averaging 13 points, 7.1 rebounds and 2.7 assists per game. On July 14, 2020, he signed with Soles de Mexicali of the Liga Nacional de Baloncesto Profesional.

Thomas is eligible to play for the Argentina national basketball team, having tried out for the Argentine U-17 team in 2010.
