= List of schools reclassifying their athletic programs to NCAA Division I =

The following is a list of United States colleges and universities that are either in the process of reclassifying their athletic programs to NCAA Division I, or have announced future plans to do the same.

== Current reclassifications ==
These schools have begun the formal Division I reclassification process. On January 16, 2025, the NCAA announced that it was lessening the reclassification period for schools, by one year, with schools already in the process of reclassifying to Division I being given the option to use either the new, shorter period or the original, longer period they initially agreed to. The new reclassification period will be three years instead of the previous four for schools transitioning from Division II and four years instead of the previous five for schools transitioning from Division III.

West Georgia has announced that it will seek to reclassify under the new three-year transition process. Mercyhurst is also potentially eligible for the three-year transition period. New Haven and West Florida entered the transition process after the three-year period was instituted.

Institution name		Teams	Former classification		Current conferences		Transition	
Full	Common	Teams	Division	Conference	Primary	Others	Start (Note: First year of transition.)	End (Note: First year of full Division I membership.)
University of West Georgia	West Georgia	Wolves	II	Gulf South Conference	Atlantic Sun Conference	United Athletic Conference	2024–25	2027–28
Mercyhurst University	Mercyhurst	Lakers	II	Pennsylvania State Athletic Conference	NEC	Atlantic Hockey America	2024–25	2028–29 (Note: Mercyhurst is potentially eligible for a shorter transition with full membership in 2027–28.)
University of New Haven	New Haven	Chargers	II	Northeast-10 Conference	NEC		2025–26	2028–29
University of West Florida	West Florida	Argonauts	II	Gulf South Conference	Atlantic Sun Conference	United Athletic Conference	2026–27	2029–30

== Reclassifying to Division III ==
This is limited to Division I schools that have announced plans to classify to Division III.

Institution		Athletics	Current Division I conference	Future Division III conference	Start year	Active (Full member)	Notes
Full	Common	Athletics	Current Division I conference	Future Division III conference	Start year	Active (Full member)	Notes
Saint Francis University	Saint Francis (PA)	Red Wolves	NEC	Presidents' Athletic Conference	2026–27	2029–30	
