= 2017–18 Seattle Redhawks men's basketball team =

American college basketball season

2017–18 Seattle Redhawks men's basketball

CBI, First round
- Conference: Western Athletic Conference
- Record: 20–14 (8–6 WAC)
- Head coach: Jim Hayford (1st season)
- Assistant coaches: Chris Victor; Nick Robinson; Ryan Madry
- Home arena: KeyArena; Connolly Center

2017–18 WAC men's basketball standings
| | Conf. | | | | Overall |
| Team | W | | L | PCT | W | | L | PCT |
|---|---|---|---|---|---|---|---|---|
| New Mexico State † | 12 | – | 2 | .857 | 28 | – | 6 | .824 |
| Utah Valley | 10 | – | 4 | .714 | 23 | – | 11 | .676 |
| Grand Canyon | 9 | – | 5 | .643 | 22 | – | 12 | .647 |
| Seattle | 8 | – | 6 | .571 | 20 | – | 14 | .588 |
| Texas–Rio Grande Valley | 6 | – | 8 | .429 | 15 | – | 18 | .455 |
| Cal State Bakersfield | 5 | – | 9 | .357 | 12 | – | 18 | .400 |
| UMKC | 5 | – | 9 | .357 | 10 | – | 22 | .313 |
| Chicago State | 1 | – | 13 | .071 | 3 | – | 29 | .094 |
† 2018 WAC tournament winner

The 2017–18 Seattle Redhawks men's basketball team represented Seattle University during the 2017–18 NCAA Division I men's basketball season. The Redhawks, led by first-year head coach Jim Hayford, played their home games at KeyArena and the Connolly Center as members of the Western Athletic Conference. They finished the season 20–14, 8–6 in WAC play to finish in fourth place. It was the Redhawks' first 20-win season since 2008 and first 20-win season in Division I play since the 1960s.

In the postseason, they defeated Texas–Rio Grande Valley to advance to the semifinals of the WAC tournament where they lost to New Mexico State. They received an invitation to the College Basketball Invitational where they lost in the first round to Central Arkansas.

== Previous season ==
The Redhawks finished the 2016–17 season 13–17, 5–9 WAC play to finish in fifth place. Due to Grand Canyon's postseason ineligibility, they received the No. 4 seed in the WAC tournament where they lost in the quarterfinals to Utah Valley.

On March 13, 2017, the school fired head coach Cameron Dollar. His eight-year record at the school was 107–138. On March 29, the school hired Jim Hayford from in-state rival Eastern Washington as their new head coach.

== Offseason ==
=== Departures ===
| Name | Number | Pos. | Height | Weight | Year | Hometown | Reason for departure |
|---|---|---|---|---|---|---|---|
| Brandan Westendorf | 0 | G | 6'5" | 195 | RS Senior | Auburn, WA | Graduated |
| Malik Montoya | 2 | G | 6'5" | 190 | Sophomore | Federal Way, WA | Graduate transferred to Central Washington |
| Emmanuel Chibuogwu | 13 | G | 6'6" | 215 | RS Senior | Shoreline, WA | Walk-on; graduated |
| Jack Shaughnessy | 14 | G | 6'2" | 190 | RS Sophomore | Woodstock, GA | Graduate transferred to West Georgia |
| William Powell | 21 | F | 6'6" | 225 | Senior | Huntsville, AL | Graduated |
| Manroop Clair | 23 | G | 6'2" | 185 | RS Senior | Vancouver, BC | Graduated |
| Zack Moore | 30 | F | 6'5" | 200 | Sophomore | Bellevue, WA | Transferred to UC Santa Barbara |
| Marko Cuze | 42 | F | 6'9" | 235 | Freshman | Zagreb, Croatia | Transferred to Cal State East Bay |

=== Incoming transfers ===
| Name | Number | Pos. | Height | Weight | Year | Hometown | Previous School |
|---|---|---|---|---|---|---|---|
| Dashawn McDowell | 0 | G | 6'5" | 185 | Sophomore | Oklahoma City, OK | Transferred from SMU. Under NCAA transfer rules, McDowell will have to sit out for the 2017–18 season. Will have three years of remaining eligibility. |
| Jordan Hill | 2 | G | 6'4" | 172 | RS Senior | Pasadena, CA | Transferred from Wisconsin. Will be eligible to play immediately since Hill graduated from Wisconsin. |
| Richaud Gittens | 10 | G | 6'4" | 200 | Senior | Tempe, AZ | Transferred from Weber State. Will be eligible to play immediately since Gittens graduated from Weber State. |
| Josh Hearlihy | 13 | G/F | 6'8" | 213 | RS Senior | Los Angeles, CA | Transferred from Vermont. Will be eligible to play immediately since Hearlihy graduated from Vermont. |
| Delante Jones | 24 | G/F | 6'5" | 195 | Junior | Lynchburg, VA | Transferred from American. Under NCAA transfer rules, Jones will have to sit out for the 2017–18 season. Will have two years of remaining eligibility. |
| Matthew Owies | | G | 6'0" | 180 | Sophomore | Melbourne, Australia | Transferred from Hawaii. Under NCAA transfer rules, Owies will have to sit out for the 2017–18 season. Will have three years of remaining eligibility. |

=== Recruiting class of 2017 ===
College recruiting
| Name | Hometown | School | Height | Weight | Commit date |
|---|---|---|---|---|---|
| Aaron Nettles; PG | Seattle, WA | Seattle Prep | 5 ft 10 in (1.78 m) | N/A | Jul 19, 2015 |
| Aaron Nettles; PG | Recruit ratings: Scout: Rivals: (NR) | | | | |
Overall recruit ranking:
Note: In many cases, Scout, Rivals, 247Sports, On3, and ESPN may conflict in their listings of height and weight.; In these cases, the average was taken. ESPN grades are on a 100-point scale.; Sources: "2017 Team Ranking". Rivals.

== Roster ==
2017–18 Seattle Redhawks men's basketball team
Players
Coaches

| Pos. | # | Name | Height | Weight | Year | Previous school | Hometown |
|---|---|---|---|---|---|---|---|
| G | 0 | Dashawn McDowell (redshirt) | 6 ft 5 in (1.96 m) | 185 lb (84 kg) | So | Southeast HS; SMU | Oklahoma City, OK |
| G | 1 | Morgan Means | 6 ft 3 in (1.91 m) | 175 lb (79 kg) | So | Redondo Union HS | Compton, CA |
| G | 2 | Jordan Hill | 6 ft 4 in (1.93 m) | 183 lb (83 kg) | RS Sr | La Salle HS; Wisconsin | Pasadena, CA |
| G | 5 | Matej Kavas | 6 ft 8 in (2.03 m) | 200 lb (91 kg) | RS So | Gimnazija Bezigrad HS | Ljubljana, Slovenia |
| G | 10 | Richard Gittens | 6 ft 4 in (1.93 m) | 195 lb (88 kg) | RS Sr | Marcos de Niza HS; Weber State | Boston, MA |
| F | 11 | Scott Ulaneo | 6 ft 10 in (2.08 m) | 215 lb (98 kg) | So | Stella Azura Academy | Rome, Italy |
| G | 12 | Mattia Da Campo | 6 ft 5 in (1.96 m) | 210 lb (95 kg) | So | Stella Azura Academy | Venice, Italy |
| G/F | 13 | Josh Hearlihy | 6 ft 8 in (2.03 m) | 215 lb (98 kg) | RS Sr | Northfield Mount Hermon HS; Vermont | Los Angeles, CA |
| G | 14 | Eric Alperin (W) | 6 ft 2 in (1.88 m) | 170 lb (77 kg) | RS So | Phillips Academy | Los Angeles, CA |
| G | 15 | Jake Spurgeon | 6 ft 7 in (2.01 m) | 215 lb (98 kg) | RS So | Lakeridge HS | Lake Oswego, OR |
| G | 21 | Collin Huun (W) | 6 ft 0 in (1.83 m) | 175 lb (79 kg) | Jr | South Salem HS; Chemeketa CC | Salem, OR |
| G | 23 | Aaron Nettles | 5 ft 11 in (1.8 m) | 175 lb (79 kg) | Fr | Seattle Prep | Seattle, WA |
| G | 24 | Delante Jones (redshirt) | 6 ft 5 in (1.96 m) | 195 lb (88 kg) | Jr | Virginia Episcopal HS; American | Chantilly, VA |
| F | 30 | Latio Cosmos (W) | 6 ft 0 in (1.83 m) | 170 lb (77 kg) | So | Overlake School | Redmond, WA |
| G/F | 35 | Brennan Corrigan (W) | 6 ft 4 in (1.93 m) | 180 lb (82 kg) | Fr | Oaks Christian School | Westlake Village, CA |
| C | 41 | Aaron Menzies | 7 ft 3 in (2.21 m) | 285 lb (129 kg) | RS Jr | Loreto Academy | Manchester, England |
| F | 42 | Myles Carter | 6 ft 9 in (2.06 m) | 230 lb (104 kg) | Jr | St. Rita of Cascia HS | Chicago, IL |
| F | | Matt Owies (redshirt) | 6 ft 0 in (1.83 m) | 180 lb (82 kg) | So | St Kevin's College; Hawaii | Melbourne, Australia |

Head coach

- Jim Hayford (Azusa Pacific)

Assistant coach(es)

- Chris Victor (Concordia–Irvine)
- Nick Robinson (Stanford)
- Ryan Madry (West Georgia)

Legend

- (C) Team captain
- (S) Suspended
- (I) Ineligible
- (W) Walk-on
- Injured
- Current redshirt

Roster
Last update: November 9, 2017

== Schedule and results ==
| Date time, TV | Rank^{#} | Opponent^{#} | Result | Record | Site (attendance) city, state |
Non-conference regular season
| November 10, 2017*; 5:00 pm | | at Saint Louis; 2K Sports Classic | L 46–62 | 0–1 | Chaifetz Arena (7,246); St. Louis, MO |
| November 12, 2017*; 4:00 pm | | Puget Sound | W 121–70 | 1–1 | Connolly Complex (907); Seattle, WA |
| November 15, 2017*; 6:00 pm, P12N | | at Washington State | L 59–75 | 1–2 | Beasley Coliseum (2,340); Pullman, WA |
| November 18, 2017*; 11:00 am | | vs. Detroit; 2K Sports Classic subregional semifinals | W 102–71 | 2–2 | Curb Event Center (1,502); Nashville, TN |
| November 19, 2017*; 11:00 am | | vs. Belmont; 2K Sports Classic subregional finals | L 77–90 | 2–3 | Curb Event Center (1,087); Nashville, TN |
| November 24, 2017*; 12:00 pm, P12N | | at Washington; 2K Sports Classic Seattle regional | L 84–89 | 2–4 | Alaska Airlines Arena (6,428); Seattle, WA |
| November 27, 2017*; 7:00 pm | | Idaho State | W 73–67 | 3–4 | KeyArena (1,178); Seattle, WA |
| November 30, 2017*; 7:30 pm | | Kennesaw State | W 66–54 | 4–4 | Connolly Complex (782); Seattle, WA |
| December 3, 2017*; 1:00 pm | | Eastern Washington | W 84–65 | 5–4 | KeyArena (1,487); Seattle, WA |
| December 4, 2017*; 7:00 pm | | Pacific Lutheran | W 99–69 | 6–4 | Connolly Complex (729); Seattle, WA |
| December 9, 2017*; 5:00 pm | | at Saint Mary's | L 73–97 | 6–5 | McKeon Pavilion (3,324); Moraga, CA |
| December 13, 2017*; 7:00 pm | | Saint Martin's | W 88–72 | 7–5 | Connolly Center (773); Seattle, WA |
| December 16, 2017*; 7:00 pm | | Portland | W 89–76 | 8–5 | KeyArena (1,569); Seattle, WA |
| December 19, 2017*; 7:00 pm | | California | L 59–81 | 8–6 | KeyArena (2,418); Seattle, WA |
| December 23, 2017*; 1:00 pm | | Nicholls State | W 95–89 | 9–6 | Connolly Center (841); Seattle, WA |
| December 28, 2017*; 7:00 pm | | Grambling State | W 93–63 | 10–6 | Connolly Center (999); Seattle, WA |
| December 30, 2017*; 1:00 pm | | UC Riverside | W 95–71 | 11–6 | Connolly Center (833); Seattle, WA |
WAC regular season
| January 6, 2018; 7:00 pm | | Grand Canyon | L 57–73 | 11–7 (0–1) | KeyArena (2,156); Seattle, WA |
| January 11, 2018; 7:00 pm | | Chicago State | W 67–64 | 12–7 (1–1) | Connolly Center (911); Seattle, WA |
| January 13, 2018; 7:00 pm | | UMKC | W 77–75 | 13–7 (2–1) | KeyArena (1,449); Seattle, WA |
| January 18, 2018; 6:00 pm, ESPN3 | | at New Mexico State | L 62–75 | 13–8 (2–2) | Pan American Center (5,035); Las Cruces, NM |
| January 20, 2018; 5:00 pm | | at Texas–Rio Grande Valley | W 79–76 ^{OT} | 14–8 (3–2) | UTRGV Fieldhouse (1,155); Edinburg, TX |
| January 26, 2018; 7:00 pm | | Cal State Bakersfield | W 59-55 | 15-8 (4-2) | KeyArena (4,448); Seattle, WA |
| February 3, 2018; 7:00 pm | | Utah Valley | W 55–54 | 16–8 (5–2) | KeyArena (3,242); Seattle, WA |
| February 8, 2018; 5:00 pm, ESPN3 | | at UMKC | L 67–74 | 16–9 (5–3) | Municipal Auditorium (1,155); Kansas City, MO |
| February 10, 2018; 12:00 pm | | at Chicago State | W 91–81 | 17–9 (6–3) | Jones Convocation Center (163); Chicago, IL |
| February 15, 2018; 7:00 pm | | Texas–Rio Grande Valley | W 85–68 | 18–9 (7–3) | Connolly Center (999); Seattle, WA |
| February 17, 2018; 1:00 pm | | New Mexico State | W 73–63 ^{OT} | 19–9 (8–3) | KeyArena (2,270); Seattle, WA |
| February 22, 2018; 6:00 pm, ESPN3 | | at Grand Canyon | L 64–76 | 19–10 (8–4) | GCU Arena (6,925); Phoenix, AZ |
| February 24, 2018; 6:00 pm, ESPN3 | | at Cal State Bakersfield | L 57–64 | 19–11 (8–5) | Icardo Center (2,887); Bakersfield, CA |
| March 3, 2018; 6:00 pm | | at Utah Valley | L 47–73 | 19–12 (8–6) | UCCU Center (4,271); Orem, UT |
WAC tournament
| March 8, 2018; 8:30 pm, ESPN3 | (4) | vs. (5) Texas–Rio Grande Valley; Quarterfinals | W 77–60 | 20–12 | Orleans Arena (1,349); Paradise, NV |
| March 9, 2018; 8:30 pm, ESPN3 | (4) | vs. (1) New Mexico State; Semifinals | L 79–84 | 20–13 | Orleans Arena (2,739); Paradise, NV |
CBI
| March 14, 2018*; 7:00 pm | | Central Arkansas; First round | L 90–92 ^{OT} | 20–14 | Connolly Center (639); Seattle, WA |
*Non-conference game. ^{#}Rankings from AP Poll. (#) Tournament seedings in parentheses. All times are in Pacific Time Source:.
