= 2017–18 Texas–Rio Grande Valley Vaqueros men's basketball team =

American college basketball season

2017–18 Texas–Rio Grande Valley Vaqueros men's basketball
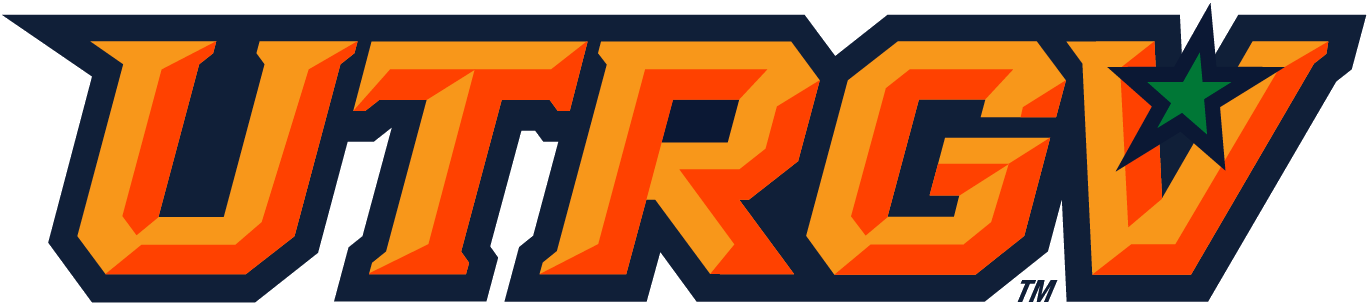

CBI, First round
- Conference: Western Athletic Conference
- Record: 15–18 (6–8 WAC)
- Head coach: Lew Hill (2nd season)
- Assistant coaches: Jai Steadman; Kenya Crandell; Luke Mackay
- Captains: Nick Dixon; Lew Stallworth; Mike Hoffman
- Home arena: UTRGV Fieldhouse

2017–18 WAC men's basketball standings
| | Conf. | | | | Overall |
| Team | W | | L | PCT | W | | L | PCT |
|---|---|---|---|---|---|---|---|---|
| New Mexico State † | 12 | – | 2 | .857 | 28 | – | 6 | .824 |
| Utah Valley | 10 | – | 4 | .714 | 23 | – | 11 | .676 |
| Grand Canyon | 9 | – | 5 | .643 | 22 | – | 12 | .647 |
| Seattle | 8 | – | 6 | .571 | 20 | – | 14 | .588 |
| Texas–Rio Grande Valley | 6 | – | 8 | .429 | 15 | – | 18 | .455 |
| Cal State Bakersfield | 5 | – | 9 | .357 | 12 | – | 18 | .400 |
| UMKC | 5 | – | 9 | .357 | 10 | – | 22 | .313 |
| Chicago State | 1 | – | 13 | .071 | 3 | – | 29 | .094 |
† 2018 WAC tournament winner

The 2017–18 Texas–Rio Grande Valley Vaqueros men's basketball team represented the University of Texas Rio Grande Valley during the 2017–18 NCAA Division I men's basketball season. The Vaqueros, led by second-year head coach Lew Hill, played their home games at the UTRGV Fieldhouse as members of the Western Athletic Conference. They finished the season 15–18, 6–8 in WAC play to finish in fifth place. They lost in the quarterfinals of the WAC tournament to Seattle. They were invited to the College Basketball Invitational where they lost in the first round to New Orleans.

== Previous season ==
The Vaqueros finished the 2016–17 season 10–22, 2–12 in WAC play to finish in seventh place. Due to Grand Canyon's ineligibility for postseason play, they received the No. 6 seed in the WAC tournament where they lost in the quarterfinals to UMKC.

== Offseason ==
=== Departures ===
| Name | Number | Pos. | Height | Weight | Year | Hometown | Reason for departure |
|---|---|---|---|---|---|---|---|
| Mike Nwabuzor | 0 | G | 6'2" | 190 | Junior | Bellflower, CA | Graduate transferred to New Mexico Highlands |
| Solomon Yon | 2 | G | 6'0" | 175 | RS Sophomore | Denver, CO | Walk-on; left the team for personal reasons |
| Walter Jones | 5 | G | 6'4" | 200 | Sophomore | Newbern, AL | Transferred to Alabama A&M |
| Adrean Johnson | 15 | F | 6'9" | 235 | Freshman | Red Oak, TX | Transferred to Paris JC |
| Clarke Cooper | 30 | G | 6'0" | 155 | Freshman | Houston, TX | Walk-on; transferred to New Mexico Military Institute |
| Gage Loy | 35 | F | 6'9" | 210 | Junior | Wichita, KS | Graduate transferred to Rogers State |
| Antonio Green | 55 | G | 6'2" | 165 | Sophomore | Tupelo, MS | Transferred to Middle Tennessee |

=== Incoming transfers ===
| Name | Number | Pos. | Height | Weight | Year | Hometown | Previous School |
|---|---|---|---|---|---|---|---|
| Terry Winn | 3 | F | 6'7" | 230 | RS Junior | Monroe, LA | Transferred from UTEP. Under NCAA transfer rules, Winn will have to sit out in the 2017–18 season. Will have two years of eligibility left. |
| Johnny Crnogorac | 20 | C | 7'1" | 220 | RS Junior | Sydney, Australia | Junior college transferred from SW Tennessee CC |

== 2017 incoming recruits ==
College recruiting information
| Name | Hometown | School | Height | Weight | Commit date |
|---|---|---|---|---|---|
| Greg Bowie II; SG | San Antonio, TX | ATHLOS Leadership Academy | 6 ft 3 in (1.91 m) | 160 lb (73 kg) | |
| Greg Bowie II; SG | Recruit ratings: Scout: Rivals: (NR) | | | | |
| Javon Levi; PG | Killeen, TX | Shoemaker High School | 5 ft 10 in (1.78 m) | N/A | Oct 27, 2016 |
| Javon Levi; PG | Recruit ratings: Scout: Rivals: (NR) | | | | |
Overall recruit ranking:
Note: In many cases, Scout, Rivals, 247Sports, On3, and ESPN may conflict in their listings of height and weight.; In these cases, the average was taken. ESPN grades are on a 100-point scale.; Sources: "2017 Team Ranking". Rivals.

== Roster ==
2017–18 Texas–Rio Grande Valley Vaqueros men's basketball team
Players
Coaches

| Pos. | # | Name | Height | Weight | Year | Previous school | Hometown |
|---|---|---|---|---|---|---|---|
| G | 0 | Greg Bowie | 6 ft 3 in (1.91 m) | 165 lb (75 kg) | Fr | Athlos Leadership Academy | San Antonio, TX |
| F | 3 | Terry Winn | 6 ft 6 in (1.98 m) | 240 lb (109 kg) | RS Jr | Westwind Preparatory Academy; UTEP | Monroe, LA |
| G | 4 | Nick Dixon (C) | 6 ft 2 in (1.88 m) | 180 lb (82 kg) | RS Sr | Proviso West; Morton College | Hillside, IL |
| G | 10 | Moe McDonald (W) | 6 ft 4 in (1.93 m) | 195 lb (88 kg) | RS Sr | IMG Academy; Highland CC | McAllen, TX |
| F | 11 | Lesley Varner II | 6 ft 7 in (2.01 m) | 180 lb (82 kg) | So | Cedar Hill | Dallas, TX |
| G | 12 | Nick Mora (W) | 6 ft 1 in (1.85 m) | 167 lb (76 kg) | So | Weslaco | Weslaco, TX |
| G | 13 | Lew Stallworth (C) | 6 ft 1 in (1.85 m) | 195 lb (88 kg) | RS Jr | William S. Hart; UTEP | Santa Clarita, CA |
| G | 14 | Javon Levi | 5 ft 10 in (1.78 m) | 165 lb (75 kg) | Fr | Shoemaker | Killeen, TX |
| C | 20 | Johnny Crnograc | 7 ft 1 in (2.16 m) | 220 lb (100 kg) | RS Jr | Marshall Academy; SW Tennessee CC | Sydney, Australia |
| F | 21 | Mike Hoffman (C) | 6 ft 8 in (2.03 m) | 205 lb (93 kg) | RS Sr | Nolan Catholic; Lafayette | Burleson, TX |
| G | 22 | Jordan Jackson | 6 ft 3 in (1.91 m) | 180 lb (82 kg) | Jr | St. Pius X Midland College | Houston, TX |
| F | 23 | Dan Kimasa | 6 ft 8 in (2.03 m) | 225 lb (102 kg) | Sr | Tampa Bay Christian Academy | Kigali City, Rwanda |
| G | 24 | Marlon Williams (W) | 6 ft 2 in (1.88 m) | 188 lb (85 kg) | Fr | United | Laredo, TX |
| G | 25 | Xavier McDaniel Jr. | 6 ft 6 in (1.98 m) | 190 lb (86 kg) | So | Hammond | Columbia, SC |
| F | 32 | Adonis Rwabigwi | 6 ft 8 in (2.03 m) | 215 lb (98 kg) | RS Sr | Tampa Prep; Furman | Kigali City, Rwanda |

Head coach

- Lew Hill (Wichita State)

Assistant coach(es)

- Jai Steadman (Nebraska)
- Kenya Crandell (Nebraska–Kearney)
- Luke Mackay (East Carolina)

Legend

- (C) Team captain
- (S) Suspended
- (I) Ineligible
- (W) Walk-on
- Injured
- Current redshirt

Roster
Last update: Oct 23, 2017

== Schedule and results ==
| Date time, TV | Rank^{#} | Opponent^{#} | Result | Record | Site (attendance) city, state |
Regular season
| Nov 10, 2017*; 7:00 pm | | Nicholls State | L 106–111 | 0–1 | UTRGV Fieldhouse (924); Edinburg, TX |
| Nov 13, 2017*; 7:00 pm | | Bethune–Cookman | W 92–74 | 1–1 | UTRGV Fieldhouse (523); Edinburg, TX |
| Nov 15, 2017*; 7:00 pm | | at Texas A&M–Corpus Christi; South Texas Showdown | W 82–75 ^{OT} | 2–1 | American Bank Center (1,437); Corpus Christi, TX |
| Nov 18, 2017*; 4:30 pm | | at Texas State | L 58–75 | 2–2 | Strahan Coliseum (1,467); San Marcos, TX |
| Nov 20, 2017*; 7:00 pm | | at North Texas | W 75–63 | 3–2 | The Super Pit (1,892); Denton, TX |
| Nov 22, 2017*; 6:00 pm, ESPN3 | | at Georgia Tech | L 68–78 | 3–3 | McCamish Pavilion (4,504); Atlanta, GA |
| Nov 25, 2017*; 7:00 pm | | Grambling State | L 76–82 | 3–4 | UTRGV Fieldhouse (478); Edinburg, TX |
| Nov 28, 2017*; 7:00 pm, ESPN3 | | at SMU | L 64–95 | 3–5 | Moody Coliseum (6,326); University Park, TX |
| Nov 30, 2017*; 7:00 pm, SECN | | at No. 9 Texas A&M | L 60–78 | 3–6 | Reed Arena (7,121); College Station, TX |
| Dec 2, 2017*; 2:00 pm | | at Rice | W 69–67 | 4–6 | Tudor Fieldhouse (1,548); Houston, TX |
| Dec 6, 2017*; 7:00 pm | | Texas A&M–Corpus Christi; South Texas Showdown | W 82–78 | 5–6 | UTRGV Fieldhouse (764); Edinburg, TX |
| Dec 9, 2017*; 7:00 pm | | UC Irvine | W 73–59 | 6–6 | UTRGV Fieldhouse (602); Edinburg, TX |
| Dec 16, 2017*; 7:00 pm | | Texas–Arlington | L 65–86 | 6–7 | UTRGV Fieldhouse (774); Edinburg, TX |
| Dec 22, 2017*; 12:00 pm, FSOK | | at Oklahoma State | L 83–102 | 6–8 | Gallagher-Iba Arena (5,287); Stillwater, OK |
| Dec 30, 2017*; 7:00 pm | | Hampton | W 80–69 | 7–8 | UTRGV Fieldhouse (546); Edinburg, TX |
| Jan 2, 2018*; 7:00 pm | | Our Lady of the Lake | W 96–75 | 8–8 | UTRGV Fieldhouse (536); Edinburg, TX |
| Jan 6, 2018; 7:00 pm | | at UMKC | W 73–61 | 9–8 (1–0) | Municipal Auditorium (955); Kansas City, MO |
| Jan 11, 2018; 9:00 pm, ESPN3 | | at Cal State Bakersfield | W 87–74 | 10–8 (2–0) | Icardo Center (2,603); Bakersfield, CA |
| Jan 13, 2018; 8:00 pm, ESPN3 | | at Grand Canyon | L 71–84 | 10–9 (2–1) | GCU Arena (7,222); Phoenix, AZ |
| Jan 18, 2018; 7:00 pm | | Utah Valley | L 76–84 | 10–10 (2–2) | UTRGV Fieldhouse (828); Edinburg, TX |
| Jan 20, 2018; 7:00 pm | | Seattle | L 76–79 ^{OT} | 10–11 (2–3) | UTRGV Fieldhouse (1,155); Edinburg, TX |
| Jan 27, 2018; 7:00 pm | | at Chicago State | W 87–81 | 11–11 (3–3) | Jones Convocation Center (463); Chicago, IL |
| Jan 30, 2018*; 7:00 pm | | Wayland Baptist | W 86–50 | 12–11 | UTRGV Fieldhouse (725); Edinburg, TX |
| Feb 3, 2018; 5:00 pm, ESPN3 | | at New Mexico State | L 67–90 | 12–12 (3–4) | Pan American Center (5,115); Las Cruces, NM |
| Feb 8, 2018; 7:00 pm | | Grand Canyon | W 83–81 | 13–12 (4–4) | UTRGV Fieldhouse (1,038); Edinburg, TX |
| Feb 10, 2018; 7:00 pm | | Cal State Bakersfield | W 68–66 | 14–12 (5–4) | UTRGV Fieldhouse (1,175); Edinburg, TX |
| Feb 15, 2018; 9:00 pm | | at Seattle | L 68–85 | 14–13 (5–5) | Connolly Center (999); Seattle, WA |
| Feb 17, 2018; 8:00 pm | | at Utah Valley | L 72–84 | 14–14 (5–6) | UCCU Center (4,271); Orem, UT |
| Feb 22, 2018; 7:00 pm | | UMKC | L 59–83 | 14–15 (5–7) | UTRGV Fieldhouse (1,163); Edinburg, TX |
| Feb 24, 2018; 7:00 pm, ESPN3 | | Chicago State | W 83–75 | 15–15 (6–7) | UTRGV Fieldhouse (1,088); Edinburg, TX |
| Mar 3, 2018; 7:00 pm | | New Mexico State | L 71–86 | 15–16 (6–8) | UTRGV Fieldhouse (1,203); Edinburg, TX |
WAC tournament
| Mar 8, 2018; 10:30 pm, ESPN3 | (5) | vs. (4) Seattle; Quarterfinals | L 60–77 | 15–17 | Orleans Arena (1,349); Paradise, NV |
CBI
| Mar 14, 2018*; 7:00 pm | | at New Orleans; First round | L 74–77 | 15–18 | Lakefront Arena (741); New Orleans, LA |
*Non-conference game. ^{#}Rankings from AP Poll. (#) Tournament seedings in parentheses. All times are in Central Source.

== See also ==
- 2017–18 Texas–Rio Grande Valley Vaqueros women's basketball team
