= 2017–18 Chicago State Cougars men's basketball team =

American college basketball season

2017–18 Chicago State Cougars men's basketball
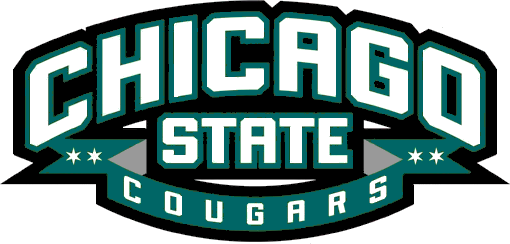
- Conference: Western Athletic Conference
- Record: 3–29 (1–13 WAC)
- Head coach: Tracy Dildy (8th season)
- Assistant coaches: James Farr; Matt Raidbard; Eddie Denard
- Home arena: Jones Convocation Center

2017–18 WAC men's basketball standings
| | Conf. | | | | Overall |
| Team | W | | L | PCT | W | | L | PCT |
|---|---|---|---|---|---|---|---|---|
| New Mexico State † | 12 | – | 2 | .857 | 28 | – | 6 | .824 |
| Utah Valley | 10 | – | 4 | .714 | 23 | – | 11 | .676 |
| Grand Canyon | 9 | – | 5 | .643 | 22 | – | 12 | .647 |
| Seattle | 8 | – | 6 | .571 | 20 | – | 14 | .588 |
| Texas–Rio Grande Valley | 6 | – | 8 | .429 | 15 | – | 18 | .455 |
| Cal State Bakersfield | 5 | – | 9 | .357 | 12 | – | 18 | .400 |
| UMKC | 5 | – | 9 | .357 | 10 | – | 22 | .313 |
| Chicago State | 1 | – | 13 | .071 | 3 | – | 29 | .094 |
† 2018 WAC tournament winner

The 2017–18 Chicago State Cougars men's basketball team represented Chicago State University during the 2017–18 NCAA Division I men's basketball season. The Cougars, led by eighth-year head coach Tracy Dildy, played their home games at the Emil and Patricia Jones Convocation Center as members of the Western Athletic Conference. They finished the season 3–29, 1–13 in WAC play to finish in last place. They lost in the quarterfinals of the WAC tournament to New Mexico State.

The Cougars had the worst average point margin in Division I at –22.7 points, despite winning two games by over 40 points.

After the season, Chicago State fired Dildy during the week of March 5, 2018, although it was not officially announced until a week later. After a nearly a five-month search, Lance Irvin, a Chicago native and former assistant coach at DePaul and several other schools, was named the new head coach of the Cougars on August 7.

== Previous season ==
The Cougars finished the 2016–17 season 6–26, 1–13 in WAC play to finish in last place. Due to Grand Canyon's ineligibility for postseason play, they received the No. 7 seed in the WAC tournament where they lost in the quarterfinals to New Mexico State.

== Offseason ==
=== Departures ===
| Name | Number | Pos. | Height | Weight | Year | Hometown | Reason for departure |
|---|---|---|---|---|---|---|---|
| Clemmye Owens V | 2 | G | 6'2" | 185 | Senior | Toledo, OH | Graduated |
| Anthony Eaves | 5 | G | 6'2" | 160 | Sophomore | Louisville, KY | Graduate transferred to Cumberlands |
| Trayvon Palmer | 15 | G/F | 6'5" | 200 | Senior | Milwaukee, WI | Graduated |
| Joshua Batson | 21 | G | 6'0" | 175 | Senior | Chicago, IL | Graduated |
| Gentry Hunt | 30 | G | 6'3" | 180 | Junior | Glenwood, IL | Graduate transferred to Grand Valley State |
| Jordan Madrid-Andrews | 33 | F | 6'8" | 240 | Senior | Denver, CO | Graduated |
| Brian Greene Jr. | 35 | G | 6'3" | 210 | Senior | Chicago, IL | Graduated |
| Charles Dent | 42 | F | 6'6" | 239 | Junior | Chicago, IL | Walk-on; transferred |

=== 2017 recruiting class ===
College recruiting information
| Name | Hometown | School | Height | Weight | Commit date |
|---|---|---|---|---|---|
| Leonard Caples; C | Chicago, IL | North Lawndale College Prep High School | 6 ft 7 in (2.01 m) | N/A | Oct 7, 2016 |
| Leonard Caples; C | Recruit ratings: Scout: Rivals: (NR) | | | | |
Overall recruit ranking:
Note: In many cases, Scout, Rivals, 247Sports, On3, and ESPN may conflict in their listings of height and weight.; In these cases, the average was taken. ESPN grades are on a 100-point scale.; Sources: "2017 Team Ranking". Rivals.

== Roster ==
2017–18 Chicago State Cougars men's basketball team
Players
Coaches

| Pos. | # | Name | Height | Weight | Year | Previous school | Hometown |
|---|---|---|---|---|---|---|---|
| G | 0 | Glen Burns | 6 ft 3 in (1.91 m) | 205 lb (93 kg) | Sr | West Memphis Christian; Danville Area CC | West Memphis, AR |
| G/F | 2 | Jelani Pruitt | 6 ft 5 in (1.96 m) | 185 lb (84 kg) | RS Sr | Merrillville HS; West Florida | Gary, IN |
| F/C | 3 | Deionte Simmons | 6 ft 8 in (2.03 m) | 230 lb (104 kg) | RS Sr | Lewisville HS; Danville Area CC | Detroit, MI |
| G/F | 5 | Alex Dubovitskiy | 6 ft 6 in (1.98 m) | 200 lb (91 kg) | Sr | Marianapolis Prep; Arizona Western CC | Moscow, Russia |
| G/F | 10 | Anthony Harris | 6 ft 5 in (1.96 m) | 195 lb (88 kg) | Jr | Griffith HS; South Suburban CC | Gary, IN |
| G | 11 | Nathan Townsen, Jr. (W) | 5 ft 11 in (1.8 m) | 160 lb (73 kg) | Fr | Bogan HS | Chicago, IL |
| G | 14 | Fred Sims, Jr. | 6 ft 4 in (1.93 m) | 193 lb (88 kg) | Jr | North Lawndale Prep | Chicago, IL |
| G | 15 | Simeon Henton | 6 ft 2 in (1.88 m) | 152 lb (69 kg) | Fr | North Chicago HS | North Chicago, IL |
| F | 21 | Cameron Bowles | 6 ft 7 in (2.01 m) | 185 lb (84 kg) | Fr | Kenwood Academy | Chicago, IL |
| F/C | 23 | Patrick Szpir | 6 ft 9 in (2.06 m) | 230 lb (104 kg) | So | Wheeling HS | Wheeling, IL |
| G | 30 | Travon Bell | 6 ft 3 in (1.91 m) | 180 lb (82 kg) | RS Fr | Mather HS | Chicago, IL |
| F | 31 | Ken Odiase (W) | 6 ft 7 in (2.01 m) | 205 lb (93 kg) | RS Jr | Homewood-Flossmoor HS; Kankakee CC | Glenwood, IL |
| G | 32 | Montana Byrd | 6 ft 4 in (1.93 m) | 225 lb (102 kg) | Sr | Mount Carmel | Chicago, IL |
| F | 33 | John Joyce | 6 ft 6 in (1.98 m) | 220 lb (100 kg) | Jr | Taft HS; Triton CC | Chicago, IL |
| G | 35 | Rob Shaw (W) | 6 ft 0 in (1.83 m) | 180 lb (82 kg) | Jr | St. Xavier HS; Kentucky State | Louisville, KY |
| F | 42 | Jalen Stephens-Holmes (W) | 6 ft 7 in (2.01 m) | 200 lb (91 kg) | Fr | Washington HS | Milwaukee, WI |

Head coach

- Tracy Dildy (UIC)

Assistant coach(es)

- James Farr (Creighton)
- Matt Raidbard (Indiana)
- Eddie Denard (Chicago State)

Legend

- (C) Team captain
- (S) Suspended
- (I) Ineligible
- (W) Walk-on
- Injured
- Current redshirt

Roster
Last update: November 9, 2017

== Schedule and results ==
| Date time, TV | Rank^{#} | Opponent^{#} | Result | Record | Site (attendance) city, state |
Non-conference regular season
| Nov 10, 2017*; 8:00 pm, BTN+ | | at Iowa | L 62–95 | 0–1 | Carver-Hawkeye Arena (12,100); Iowa City, IA |
| Nov 12, 2017*; 4:00 pm, BTN | | at No. 20 Purdue; Battle 4 Atlantis campus game | L 42–111 | 0–2 | Mackey Arena (13,509); West Lafayette, IN |
| Nov 14, 2017*; 7:05 pm | | Silver Lake | W 101–53 | 1–2 | Jones Convocation Center (650); Chicago, IL |
| Nov 16, 2017*; 6:00 pm, ACCN Extra | | at No. 13 Notre Dame | L 66–105 | 1–3 | Joyce Center (8,046); Notre Dame, IN |
| Nov 18, 2017*; 11:00 am, ESPN3 | | at Northern Iowa; Battle 4 Atlantis campus game | L 44–82 | 1–4 | McLeod Center (3,051); Cedar Falls, IA |
| Nov 23, 2017*; 7:05 pm | | East–West | W 113–65 | 2–4 | Jones Convocation Center (355); Chicago, IL |
| Nov 23, 2017*; 11:00 am | | at UMBC; Battle 4 Atlantis | L 73–84 | 2–5 | Retriever Activities Center (334); Baltimore, MD |
| Nov 24, 2017*; 11:00 am | | vs. Presbyterian; Battle 4 Atlantis | L 73–75 | 2–6 | Retriever Activities Center (113); Baltimore, MD |
| Nov 26, 2017*; 2:00 pm, ESPN3 | | at Drake | L 67–79 | 2–7 | Knapp Center (2,386); Des Moines, IA |
| Nov 29, 2017*; 8:00 pm, FS2 | | at Marquette | L 69–95 | 2–8 | BMO Harris Bradley Center (11,685); Milwaukee, WI |
| Dec 2, 2017*; 2:05 pm | | Northern Illinois | L 77–95 | 2–9 | Jones Convocation Center (463); Chicago, IL |
| Dec 9, 2017*; 2:00 pm, ESPN3 | | at Oakland | L 50–82 | 2–10 | Athletics Center O'rena (3,286); Rochester, MI |
| Dec 11, 2017*; 6:00 pm, FS1 | | at Northwestern | L 31–96 | 2–11 | Allstate Arena (5,007); Evanston, IL |
| Dec 16, 2017*; 2:05 pm | | Bradley | L 58–84 | 2–12 | Jones Convocation Center (750); Chicago, IL |
| Dec 19, 2017*; 7:00 pm | | at SIU Edwardsville | L 76–88 | 2–13 | Vadalabene Center (1,005); Edwardsville, IL |
| Dec 27, 2017*; 8:00 pm, ESPNU | | at Wisconsin | L 70–82 | 2–14 | Kohl Center (17,022); Madison, WI |
| Dec 30, 2017*; 3:30 pm | | at Western Michigan | L 71–92 | 2–15 | University Arena (2,364); Kalamazoo, MI |
WAC regular season
| Jan 6, 2018; 2:05 pm | | New Mexico State | L 60–97 | 2–16 (0–1) | Jones Convocation Center (563); Chicago, IL |
| Jan 11, 2018; 9:00 pm | | at Seattle | L 64–67 | 2–17 (0–2) | Connolly Center (911); Seattle, WA |
| Jan 13, 2018; 8:00 pm | | at Utah Valley | L 58–83 | 2–18 (0–3) | UCCU Center (3,741); Orem, UT |
| Jan 18, 2018; 7:05 pm | | Grand Canyon | L 58–86 | 2–19 (0–4) | Jones Convocation Center (463); Chicago, IL |
| Jan 20, 2018; 2:05 pm | | Cal State Bakersfield | L 78–89 | 2–20 (0–5) | Jones Convocation Center (363); Chicago, IL |
| Jan 27, 2018; 3:05 pm | | Texas–Rio Grande Valley | L 81–87 | 2–21 (0–6) | Jones Convocation Center (463); Chicago, IL |
| Feb 1, 2018; 9:00 pm | | at Cal State Bakersfield | L 61–91 | 2–22 (0–7) | Icardo Center (2,343); Bakersfield, CA |
| Feb 3, 2018; 8:00 pm, ESPN3 | | at Grand Canyon | L 55–89 | 2–23 (0–8) | GCU Arena (7,244); Phoenix, AZ |
| Feb 8, 2018; 7:05 pm | | Utah Valley | L 57–97 | 2–24 (0–9) | Jones Convocation Center (163); Chicago, IL |
| Feb 10, 2018; 2:05 pm | | Seattle | L 81–91 | 2–25 (0–10) | Jones Convocation Center (163); Chicago, IL |
| Feb 15, 2018; 7:00 pm | | at UMKC | L 67–76 | 2–26 (0–11) | Municipal Auditorium (1,325); Kansas City, MO |
| Feb 22, 2018; 7:00 pm | | at New Mexico State | L 67–78 | 2–27 (0–12) | Pan American Center (4,404); Las Cruces, NM |
| Feb 24, 2018; 7:00 pm, ESPN3 | | at Texas–Rio Grande Valley | L 75–83 | 2–28 (0–13) | UTRGV Fieldhouse (1,088); Edinburg, TX |
| Mar 3, 2018; 4:35 pm | | UMKC | W 96–82 | 3–28 (1–13) | Jones Convocation Center (553); Chicago, IL |
WAC tournament
| Mar 8, 2018; 8:00 pm, ESPN3 | (8) | vs. (1) New Mexico State; Quarterfinals | L 70–97 | 3–29 | Orleans Arena; Paradise, NV |
*Non-conference game. ^{#}Rankings from AP Poll. (#) Tournament seedings in parentheses. All times are in Central Source.
