= 2017–18 Utah Valley Wolverines men's basketball team =

American college basketball season

2017–18 Utah Valley Wolverines men's basketball

CBI, Quarterfinals
- Conference: Western Athletic Conference
- Record: 23–11 (10–4 WAC)
- Head coach: Mark Pope (3rd season)
- Assistant coaches: Cody Fueger; Chris Burgess; Eric Daniels
- Home arena: UCCU Center

2017–18 WAC men's basketball standings
	Conf.				Overall
Team	W		L	PCT	W		L	PCT
New Mexico State †	12	–	2	.857	28	–	6	.824
Utah Valley	10	–	4	.714	23	–	11	.676
Grand Canyon	9	–	5	.643	22	–	12	.647
Seattle	8	–	6	.571	20	–	14	.588
Texas–Rio Grande Valley	6	–	8	.429	15	–	18	.455
Cal State Bakersfield	5	–	9	.357	12	–	18	.400
UMKC	5	–	9	.357	10	–	22	.313
Chicago State	1	–	13	.071	3	–	29	.094
† 2018 WAC tournament winner

The 2017–18 Utah Valley Wolverines men's basketball team represented Utah Valley University in the 2017–18 NCAA Division I men's basketball season. The Wolverines, led by third-year head coach Mark Pope, played their home games at the UCCU Center in Orem, Utah as members of the Western Athletic Conference. They finished the season 23–11, 10–4 in WAC play to finish in second place. They defeated Cal State Bakersfield in the quarterfinals of the WAC tournament before losing in the semifinals to Grand Canyon. They were invited to the College Basketball Invitational where they defeated Eastern Washington in the first round before losing in the quarterfinals to San Francisco.

== Previous season ==
The Wolverines finished the 2016–17 season 17–17, 6–8 in WAC play to finish in fifth place. They defeated Seattle in the quarterfinals of the WAC tournament before losing in the semifinals to Cal State Bakersfield. They received an invitation to the College Basketball Invitational where they defeated Georgia Southern and Rice before losing in the semifinals to Wyoming.

== Offseason ==
=== Departures ===
Name	Number	Pos.	Height	Weight	Year	Hometown	Reason for departure
Telly Davenport	3	G	6'4"	195	Sophomore	Idaho Falls, ID	Transferred to College of Southern Idaho
Jordan Poydras	10	G	6'3"	185	Senior	Los Angeles, CA	Graduated
Ivory Young	13	G	6'3"	185	Senior	Houston, TX	Graduated
Jared Stutzman	24	G	6'6"	205	Freshman	Idaho Falls, ID	Transferred to Idaho State
Andrew Bastien	42	F	6'9"	235	Senior	Tustin, CA	Graduated

=== Incoming transfers ===
Name	Number	Pos.	Height	Weight	Year	Hometown	Previous School
Ben Nakwaasah	10	G	6'2"	175	Junior	Richardson, TX	Junior college transferred from Jacksonville College
Jerrelle DeBerry	15	G	6'5"	205	Senior	Milwaukee, WI	Transferred from Kent State. Under NCAA transfer rules, DeBerry will have to sit out for the 2017–18 season. Will have one year of remaining eligibility.
Baylee Steele	44	F/C	6'11"	235	Junior	Norwalk, IA	Transferred from Eastern Michigan. Under NCAA transfer rules, Harris will have to sit out for the 2017–18 season. Will have two years of remaining eligibility.

=== Recruiting class of 2017 ===
College recruiting information
Name	Hometown	School	Height	Weight	Commit date
Richard Harward #70 C	Orem, UT	Orem High School	6 ft 9 in (2.06 m)	255 lb (116 kg)	Aug 11, 2014
Richard Harward #70 C	Recruit ratings: Scout: Rivals: (62)				
Overall recruit ranking:
Note: In many cases, Scout, Rivals, 247Sports, On3, and ESPN may conflict in their listings of height and weight.; In these cases, the average was taken. ESPN grades are on a 100-point scale.; Sources: "2017 Team Ranking". Rivals.

== Roster ==
2017–18 Utah Valley Wolverines men's basketball team
Players
Coaches

Pos.	#	Name	Height	Weight	Year	Previous school	Hometown
C	0	Akolda Manyang	7 ft 0 in (2.13 m)	245 lb (111 kg)	RS Sr	Potter House Christian; Oklahoma	Rochester, MN
G	1	Cory Calvert (W)	6 ft 3 in (1.91 m)	190 lb (86 kg)	RS Jr	Chaparral; BYU	Parker, CO
G	2	Jake Toolson	6 ft 5 in (1.96 m)	205 lb (93 kg)	RS So	Highland; BYU	Gilbert, AZ
G	3	Brandon Randolph	6 ft 2 in (1.88 m)	190 lb (86 kg)	RS Sr	Inglewood; Xavier	Inglewood, CA
G	5	Hayden Scheneck	6 ft 4 in (1.93 m)	195 lb (88 kg)	RS So	Weber; Salt Lake CC	Eden, UT
G	10	Ben Nakwaasah	6 ft 2 in (1.88 m)	175 lb (79 kg)	Jr	Richardson; Jacksonville College	Richardson, TX
G	11	Connor Toolson	6 ft 4 in (1.93 m)	185 lb (84 kg)	Jr	Lone Peak; Jacksonville College	Highland, UT
F	12	Joonas Tahvanainen	6 ft 6 in (1.98 m)	220 lb (100 kg)	So	HBA-Marksy	Helsinki, Finland
G	13	McKay Johnson (W)	6 ft 5 in (1.96 m)	195 lb (88 kg)	RS So	Viewmont; Salt Lake CC	Centerville, UT
G	14	Daniel Nyman (W)	6 ft 2 in (1.88 m)	185 lb (84 kg)	RS So	American Fork; Snow College	Highland, UT
G	15	Jerrelle DeBerry (redshirt)	6 ft 5 in (1.96 m)	205 lb (93 kg)	Sr	Quality; Kent State	Milwaukee, WI
G	21	Zach Nelson	6 ft 8 in (2.03 m)	220 lb (100 kg)	RS Sr	Yuba City	Yuba City, CA
C	22	Isaac Neilson	6 ft 10 in (2.08 m)	245 lb (111 kg)	RS Sr	Mission Viejo; BYU	Mission Viejo, CA
G	25	Kenneth Ogbe	6 ft 6 in (1.98 m)	190 lb (86 kg)	RS Sr	Urspring Academy; Utah	Ehingen, Germany
C	44	Baylee Steele (redshirt)	6 ft 11 in (2.11 m)	245 lb (111 kg)	Jr	Norwalk; Eastern Michigan	Norwalk, IA
C	55	Richard Harward	6 ft 11 in (2.11 m)	255 lb (116 kg)	Fr	Orem	Orem, UT

Head coach

- Mark Pope (Kentucky)

Assistant coach(es)

- Cody Fueger (Utah)
- Chris Burgess (Utah)
- Eric Daniels (Johnson & Wales)

Legend

- (C) Team captain
- (S) Suspended
- (I) Ineligible
- (W) Walk-on
- Injured
- Current redshirt

Roster

== Schedule and results ==
The Wolverines notably promoted their first two regular-season games as the "Toughest 24 Hours in College Basketball History", complete with a Twitter hashtag of #Toughest24, which involved the Wolverines visiting Pope's alma mater of Kentucky on November 10, followed the next day by a visit to Duke. With Duke ranked No. 1 in the preseason AP Poll and Kentucky ranked No. 5, this marked the first time in the AP Poll era (1948–49 to present) that a team opened its season with road games against two top-5 opponents.

Date time, TV	Rank^{#}	Opponent^{#}	Result	Record	High points	High rebounds	High assists	Site (attendance) city, state
Exhibition
November 1, 2017*; 7:00 pm		Dixie State	W 81–70		19 – Manyang	10 – Manyang	3 – Tied	UCCU Center (1,488); Orem, UT
Non-conference regular season
November 10, 2017*; 5:00 pm, SECN		at No. 5 Kentucky	L 63–73	0–1	12 – Ogbe	9 – Neilson	7 – Randolph	Rupp Arena (19,807); Lexington, KY
November 11, 2017*; 5:00 pm, ACCN Extra		at No. 1 Duke	L 69–99	0–2	17 – Manyang	12 – Manyang	6 – Manyang	Cameron Indoor Stadium (9,314); Durham, NC
November 14, 2017*; 7:00 pm, Pluto TV 243		at Idaho State	L 71–84	1–2	27 – J. Toolson	7 – Manyang	4 – Tied	Holt Arena (1,387); Pocatello, ID
November 18, 2017*; 3:00 pm		UC Davis	W 80–71	2–2	21 – Ogbe	8 – Manyang	6 – Randolph	UCCU Center (2,726); Orem, UT
November 20, 2017*; 6:00 pm		Eastern Oregon	W 97–52	3–2	20 – Manyang	11 – Manyang	6 – C. Toolson	UCCU Center (2,329); Orem, UT
November 25, 2017*; 1:00 pm, FS NO, Pluto TV 240		at North Dakota	L 75–83 ^{OT}	4–2	24 – Manyang	10 – J. Toolson	2 – Tied	Betty Engelstad Sioux Center (1,669); Grand Forks, ND
November 29, 2017*; 7:00 pm, BYUtv		BYU; Old Oquirrh Bucket	L 58–85	4–3	16 – Randolph	5 – Manyang	2 – Randolph	UCCU Center (7,574); Orem, UT
December 2, 2017*; 7:00 pm		UTSA	W 88–80	5–3	19 – Tied	12 – Neilson	6 – Randolph	UCCU Center (2,762); Orem, UT
December 6, 2017*; 7:00 pm		Weber State; Old Oquirrh Bucket	W 83–56	6–3	25 – Manyang	15 – Manyang	9 – J. Toolson	UCCU Center (3,389); Orem, UT
December 9, 2017*; 7:00 pm		at Cal State Fullerton	L 83–91	6–4	17 – Ogbe	9 – Manyang	5 – Randolph	Titan Gym (914); Fullerton, CA
December 14, 2017*; 7:00 pm		Bethesda	W 106–44	7–4	19 – J. Toolson	8 – 3 tied	7 – Randolph	UCCU Center (2,705); Orem, UT
December 17, 2017*; 9:00 pm, SPEC HI		at Hawaii	L 69–70	7–5	18 – J. Toolson	8 – Manyang	3 – Randolph	Stan Sheriff Center (5,187); Honolulu, HI
December 20, 2017*; 7:00 pm		Montana Tech	W 84–56	8–5	17 – Ogbe	7 – Tied	4 – Tied	UCCU Center (2,105); Orem, UT
December 22, 2017*; 11:00 am		at Sam Houston State	W 75–64	9–5	21 – Manyang	10 – Manyang	8 – Randolph	Bernard Johnson Coliseum (610); Huntsville, TX
December 28, 2017*; 7:00 pm		UC Riverside	W 90–82	10–5	20 – Tied	8 – Neilson	6 – Nakwaasah	UCCU Center (2,936); Orem, UT
December 30, 2017*; 7:00 pm		Cal State Fullerton	W 87–78	11–5	23 – Ogbe	9 – Manyang	5 – Ogbe	UCCU Center (3,158); Orem, UT
WAC regular season
January 6, 2018; 7:00 pm		Cal State Bakersfield	W 75–42	12–5 (1–0)	15 – J. Toolson	7 – J. Toolson	4 – Tied	UCCU Center (3,178); Orem, UT
January 11, 2018; 7:00 pm		UMKC	W 95–59	13–5 (2–0)	18 – Ogbe	9 – Neilson	6 – J. Toolson	UCCU Center (2,733); Orem, UT
January 13, 2018; 7:00 pm		Chicago State	W 83–58	14–5 (3–0)	22 – Manyang	9 – Manyang	6 – Nakwaasah	UCCU Center (3,741); Orem, UT
January 18, 2018; 6:00 pm		at Texas–Rio Grande Valley	W 84–76	15–5 (4–0)	23 – C. Toolson	12 – Manyang	12 – Randolph	UTRGV Fieldhouse (828); Edinburg, TX
January 20, 2018; 4:00 pm, ESPN3		at New Mexico State	L 59–86	15–6 (4–1)	13 – Ogbe	4 – Tied	3 – Randolph	Pan American Center (6,046); Las Cruces, NM
January 27, 2018; 3:00 pm, ESPN3		Grand Canyon	W 68–56	16–6 (5–1)	14 – Manyang	6 – Manyang	4 – Tied	UCCU Center (4,881); Orem, UT
February 3, 2018; 7:00 pm		at Seattle	L 54–55	16–7 (5–2)	15 – Randolph	9 – Neilson	6 – Randolph	KeyArena (3,242); Seattle, WA
February 8, 2018; 6:00 pm		at Chicago State	W 97–57	17–7 (6–2)	18 – Tied	11 – Manyang	4 – 3 tied	Jones Convocation Center (163); Chicago, IL
February 10, 2018; 6:00 pm		at UMKC	L 70–77	17–8 (6–3)	22 – Manyang	9 – Manyang	9 – Randolph	Municipal Auditorium (1,357); Kansas City, MO
February 15, 2018; 7:00 pm		New Mexico State	W 86–79	18–8 (7–3)	22 – Ogbe	7 – C. Toolson	5 – J. Toolson	UCCU Center (4,271); Orem, UT
February 17, 2018; 7:00 pm		Texas–Rio Grande Valley	W 84–72	19–8 (8–3)	16 – Tied	8 – J. Toolson	6 – Randolph	UCCU Center (4,271); Orem, UT
February 22, 2018; 8:00 pm		at Cal State Bakersfield	W 70–47	20–8 (9–3)	22 – C. Toolson	7 – Neilson	4 – J. Toolson	Icardo Center (2,644); Bakersfield, CA
February 24, 2018; 7:00 pm, ESPN3		at Grand Canyon	L 59–60	20–9 (9–4)	15 – Randolph	7 – C. Toolson	2 – Randolph	GCU Arena (7,179); Phoenix, AZ
March 3, 2018; 7:00 pm		Seattle	W 73–47	21–9 (10–4)	17 – C. Toolson	6 – C. Toolson	3 – C. Toolson	UCCU Center (4,271); Orem, UT
WAC tournament
March 8, 2018; 3:30 pm, ESPN3	(2)	vs. (7) Cal State Bakersfield; Quarterfinals	W 81–74	22–9	19 – J. Toolson	10 – Nelson	3 – Randolph	Orleans Arena (1,508); Paradise, NV
March 9, 2018; 7:00 pm, ESPN3	(2)	vs. (3) Grand Canyon; Semifinals	L 60–75	22–10	18 – Manyang	12 – Manyang	2 – Randolph	Orleans Arena (2,739); Paradise, NV
CBI
March 13, 2018*; 7:00 pm		Eastern Washington; First round	W 87–65	23–10	20 – Manyang	11 – Manyang	5 – Tied	UCCU Center (997); Orem, UT
March 19, 2018*; 8:00 pm		at San Francisco; Quarterfinals	L 73–78	23–11	20 – Ogbe	11 – Manyang	4 – Randolph	War Memorial Gymnasium (1,239); San Francisco, CA
*Non-conference game. ^{#}Rankings from AP Poll. (#) Tournament seedings in parentheses. All times are in Mountain Time.
