= Chris Jans =

American basketball player and coach (born 1969)

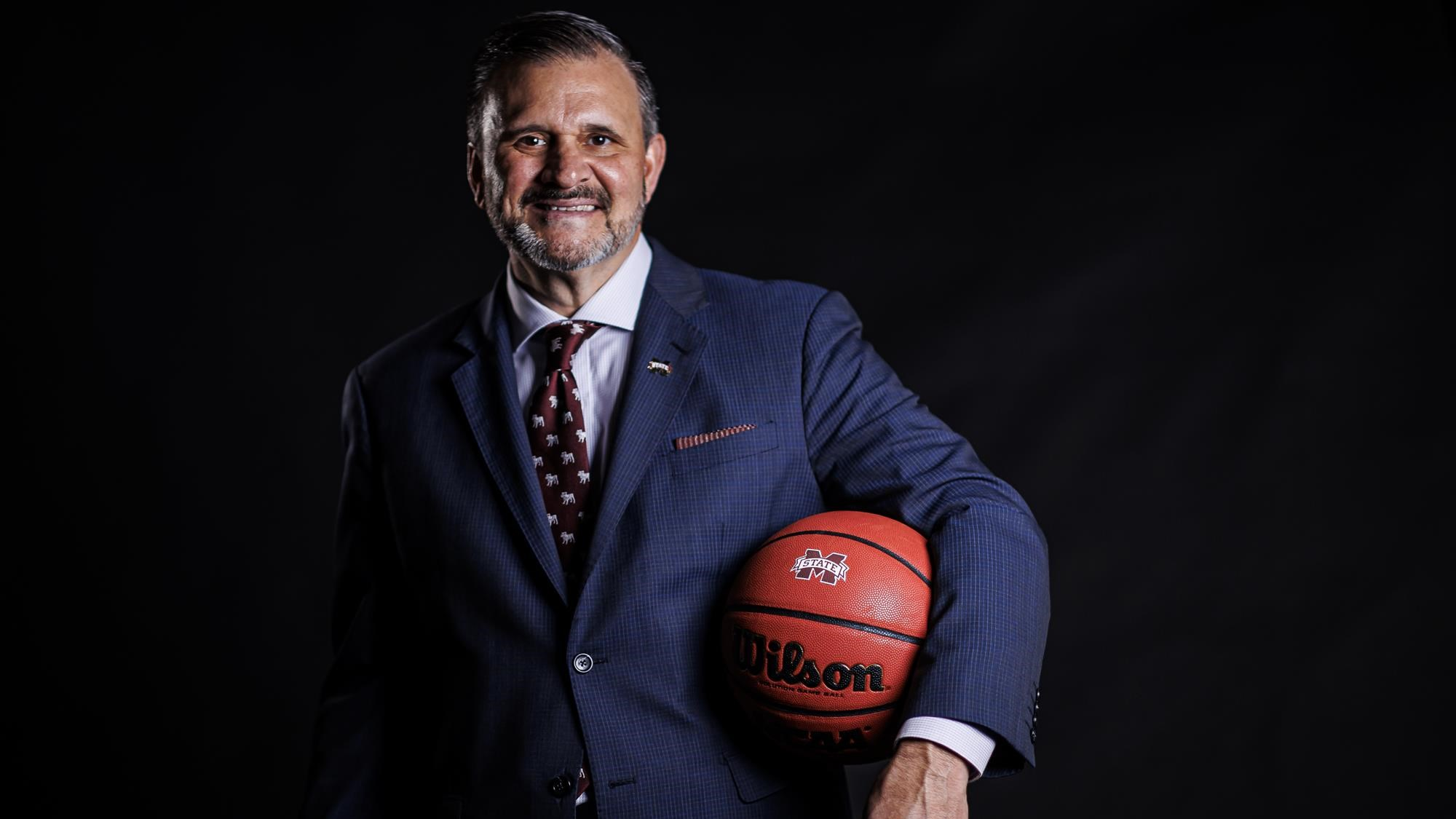

Current position
- Title: Head coach
- Team: Mississippi State
- Conference: SEC
- Record: 81–60 (.574)

Biographical details
- Born: April 12, 1969 (age 57); Fairbank, Iowa, U.S.

Playing career
- 1987–1991: Loras

Coaching career (HC unless noted)
- 1991–1994: Elmhurst (assistant)
- 1994–1996: Grand View (assistant)
- 1996–1998: Kirkwood CC
- 1998–1999: Independence CC
- 1999–2001: Idaho (assistant)
- 2001–2003: Howard JC
- 2003–2004: Chipola
- 2004–2007: Illinois State (assistant)
- 2007–2014: Wichita State (assistant)
- 2014–2015: Bowling Green
- 2015–2017: Wichita State (special assistant)
- 2017–2022: New Mexico State
- 2022–present: Mississippi State

Head coaching record
- Overall: 224–104 (.683) (college); 159–45 (.779) (junior college)
- Tournaments: 1–6 (NCAA); 1–1 (CIT)

Accomplishments and honors

Championships
- NJCAA Division II tournament (1998); 2 ICCAC regular season (1997, 1998); Panhandle regular season (2004); 4 WAC regular season (2018–2020, 2022); 3 WAC tournament (2018, 2019, 2022)

Awards
- NJCAA Division II Coach of the Year (1998); 3× WAC Coach of the Year (2018–2020)

Christopher Paul Jans (born April 12, 1969) is an American college basketball coach who is currently the head coach of the Mississippi State Bulldogs men's basketball team. Jans previously coached at New Mexico State, where he led the Aggies from 2017 to 2022.

== Biography ==
Jans is a graduate of Loras College, and hails from Fairbank, Iowa.

Jans was hired by Bowling Green in March 2014—his first Division I job. He led Bowling Green to its most wins in 13 years. On March 21, shortly after losing to Canisius in the 2nd round of the 2015 CollegeInsider.com Postseason Tournament, a drunken Jans was seen engaging in lewd and inappropriate behavior toward women at a bar near campus. A witness sent a video of the incident to school officials. Following an internal investigation, Bowling Green fired Jans for violating a morals clause in his contract.

Jans was hired at New Mexico State in 2017 and led the team to a 27–7 record in 2021–22, including an NCAA Tournament victory. He finished with a 122–32 mark at New Mexico State, winning four regular-season and three Western Athletic Conference tournament championships.

On March 20, 2022, Jans was hired as head coach at Mississippi State. He made the NCAA Tournament in his first three years with the team.

== Personal life ==
Jans resides in Starkville with his wife Sheri and they have two children.

== Head coaching record ==
=== Junior college ===
Record table
Season	Team	Overall	Conference	Standing	Postseason
Kirkwood Eagles (Iowa Community College Athletic Conference) (1996–1998)
1996–97	Kirkwood	25–10			NJCAA Division II Tournament
1997–98	Kirkwood	31–6			NJCAA Division II Champion
Kirkwood:		56–16 (.778)			
Independence Pirates (Kansas Jayhawk Community College Conference) (1998–1999)
1998–99	Independence	22–10	14–4		
Independence:		22–10 (.688)	14–4 (.778)		
Howard College Hawks (Western Junior College Athletic Conference) (2001–2003)
2001–02	Howard College	20–10			
2002–03	Howard College	29–4			
Howard College:		49–14 (.778)			
Chipola Indians (Panhandle Conference) (2003–2004)
2003–04	Chipola	32–5	11–1	1st	NJCAA Division I Tournament
Chipola:		32–5 (.865)	11–1 (.917)		
Total:		159–45 (.779)			
National champion Postseason invitational champion Conference regular season champion Conference regular season and conference tournament champion Division regular season champion Division regular season and conference tournament champion Conference tournament champion

=== College ===
Record table
Season	Team	Overall	Conference	Standing	Postseason
Bowling Green Falcons (Mid-American Conference) (2014–2015)
2014–15	Bowling Green	21–12	11–7	3rd (East)	CIT Second Round
Bowling Green:		21–12 (.636)	11–7 (.611)		
New Mexico State Aggies (Western Athletic Conference) (2017–2022)
2017–18	New Mexico State	28–6	12–2	1st	NCAA Division I Round of 64
2018–19	New Mexico State	30–5	15–1	1st	NCAA Division I Round of 64
2019–20	New Mexico State	25–6	16–0	1st	No postseason held
2020–21	New Mexico State	12–8	7–6	3rd	
2021–22	New Mexico State	27–7	14–4	T–1st	NCAA Division I Round of 32
New Mexico State:		122–32 (.792)	64–13 (.831)		
Mississippi State Bulldogs (Southeastern Conference) (2022–present)
2022–23	Mississippi State	21–13	8–10	T–9th	NCAA Division I First Four
2023–24	Mississippi State	21–14	8–10	9th	NCAA Division I Round of 64
2024–25	Mississippi State	21–13	8–10	T–9th	NCAA Division I Round of 64
2025–26	Mississippi State	13–19	5–13	13th	
2026–27	Mississippi State	5–1	0–0		
Mississippi State:		81–60 (.574)	29–43 (.403)		
Total:		224–104 (.683)			
National champion Postseason invitational champion Conference regular season champion Conference regular season and conference tournament champion Division regular season champion Division regular season and conference tournament champion Conference tournament champion
