= 2017–18 New Mexico State Aggies men's basketball team =

American college basketball season

2017–18 New Mexico State Aggies men's basketball

WAC regular season and tournament champions

NCAA tournament, First Round
- Conference: Western Athletic Conference
- Record: 28–6 (12–2 WAC)
- Head coach: Chris Jans (1st season)
- Assistant coaches: Lou Gudino; David Anwar; Jeff Mailhot
- Home arena: Pan American Center

2017–18 WAC men's basketball standings
	Conf.				Overall
Team	W		L	PCT	W		L	PCT
New Mexico State †	12	–	2	.857	28	–	6	.824
Utah Valley	10	–	4	.714	23	–	11	.676
Grand Canyon	9	–	5	.643	22	–	12	.647
Seattle	8	–	6	.571	20	–	14	.588
Texas–Rio Grande Valley	6	–	8	.429	15	–	18	.455
Cal State Bakersfield	5	–	9	.357	12	–	18	.400
UMKC	5	–	9	.357	10	–	22	.313
Chicago State	1	–	13	.071	3	–	29	.094
† 2018 WAC tournament winner

The 2017–18 New Mexico State Aggies men's basketball team represented New Mexico State University during the 2017–18 NCAA Division I men's basketball season. The Aggies, led by first-year head coach Chris Jans, played their home games at the Pan American Center in Las Cruces, New Mexico as members of the Western Athletic Conference. They finished the season 28–6, 12–2 in WAC play to win the WAC regular season championship. In the WAC tournament, they defeated Chicago State, Seattle, and Grand Canyon to become WAC Tournament champions. They received the WAC's automatic bid to the NCAA tournament where they lost in the first round to Clemson.

== Previous season ==
The Aggies finished the 2016–17 season 28–6, 11–3 in WAC play to finish in a tie for second place. They defeated Chicago State, UMKC, and Cal State Bakersfield to win the WAC tournament. As a result, they received the conference's automatic bid to the NCAA tournament where they lost in the first round to Baylor.

On April 11, 2017, head coach Paul Weir resigned to become the head coach at New Mexico. On April 17, the school hired Chris Jans as head coach.

== Offseason ==
=== Departures ===
Name	Number	Pos.	Height	Weight	Year	Hometown	Reason for departure
Travon Landry	0	G	6'1"	184	RS Junior	San Antonio, TX	Left the team for personal reasons
Jermaine Haley	1	G	6'7"	185	RS Freshman	Burnaby, BC	Transferred to Odessa College
Braxton Huggins	2	G	6'3"	184	Junior	Bakersfield, CA	Transferred to Fresno State
Chance Ellis	3	G	6'3"	217	Sophomore	Queens, NY	Transferred to Prairie View A&M
Ian Baker	4	G	6'0"	190	Senior	Washington, D.C.	Graduated
Matt Taylor	5	G	6'4"	173	Junior	Toronto, ON	Declare for 2017 NBA draft
Tanveer Bhullar	21	C	7'2"	285	RS Junior	Toronto, ON	Graduate transferred to Missouri State
Marlon Jones	23	F	6'9"	222	Junior	Chicago, IL	Left Program
Bollo Gnahore	34	C	6'10"	258	RS Freshman	Abidjan, Ivory Coast	Left Program
Jalyn Pennie	35	G	6'5"	185	Junior	Toronto, ON	Graduate transferred to Cal State Los Angeles

=== Incoming transfers ===
Name	Number	Pos.	Height	Weight	Year	Hometown	Previous School
Keyon Jones	0	G	6'2"	185	Junior	Dorchester, MA	Junior college transferred from Odessa College
Shunn Buchanan	1	G	6'0"	165	Sophomore	Madison, MS	Junior college transferred from NE Mississippi CC
Wayne Stewart	2	G	6'5"	170	Sophomore	Philadelphia, PA	Junior college transferred from Lamar CC
Zach Lofton	23	G	6'3"	180	RS Senior	St. Paul, MN	Graduate transferred from Texas Southern. Will be eligible to play immediately, graduated from Texas Southern.
Leston Gordon	24	C	6'7"	225	Junior	Tunapuna, Trinidad and Tobago	Junior college transferred from Lee College
C. J. Bobbitt		F	6'7"	225	Junior	Harker Heights, TX	Transferred from Denver. Under NCAA transfer rules, Bobbitt will have to sit out in the 2017–18 season. Will have two years of eligibility left.
JoJo Zamora		G	6'2"	170	Senior	Oakland, CA	Transferred from Utah. Under NCAA transfer rules, Zamora will have to sit out in the 2017–18 season. Will have one year of eligibility left.

=== 2017 recruiting class ===
College recruiting
Name	Hometown	School	Height	Weight	Commit date
Robert Brown #52 PF	Dallas, TX	Advanced Prep International	6 ft 8 in (2.03 m)	N/A	
Robert Brown #52 PF	Recruit ratings: Rivals: (78)				
Gabe Hadley; PG	Launceston, Australia	Scotch College	6 ft 2 in (1.88 m)	177 lb (80 kg)	
Gabe Hadley; PG	Recruit ratings: No ratings found				
Jabari Rice; SG	Houston, TX	Fort Bend Marshall	6 ft 4 in (1.93 m)	180 lb (82 kg)	Jun 1, 2017
Jabari Rice; SG	Recruit ratings: No ratings found				
Kortrijk Miles; SF	Dallas, TX	Lincoln High School	6 ft 4 in (1.93 m)	180 lb (82 kg)	Aug 16, 2017
Kortrijk Miles; SF	Recruit ratings: Rivals:				
Overall recruit ranking:
Note: In many cases, Scout, Rivals, 247Sports, On3, and ESPN may conflict in their listings of height and weight.; In these cases, the average was taken. ESPN grades are on a 100-point scale.; Sources: "2017 New Mexico State Basketball Commits". ESPN.

== Roster ==
2017–18 New Mexico State Aggies men's basketball team
Players
Coaches

Pos.	#	Name	Height	Weight	Year	Previous school	Hometown
G	0	Keyon Jones	6 ft 1 in (1.85 m)	207 lb (94 kg)	Jr	Milton HS; Odessa JC	Dorchester, MA
G	1	Shunn Buchanan	6 ft 0 in (1.83 m)	170 lb (77 kg)	So	Madison Central HS; Northeast Mississippi CC	Durant, MS
G	2	Wayne Stewart	6 ft 6 in (1.98 m)	185 lb (84 kg)	Jr	Philadelphia Military Academy; Lamar CC	Philadelphia, PA
G	3	Gabe Hadley	6 ft 3 in (1.91 m)	195 lb (88 kg)	Fr	Templestowe College	Melbourne, Australia
G	5	Kortrijk Miles	6 ft 4 in (1.93 m)	180 lb (82 kg)	Fr	Lincoln HS	Dallas, TX
G	10	Jemerrio Jones	6 ft 5 in (1.96 m)	200 lb (91 kg)	Sr	Melrose HS; Hill JC	Memphis, TN
F	11	Johnathon Wilkins	6 ft 10 in (2.08 m)	230 lb (104 kg)	RS Sr	La Lumiere HS	Lille, France
G	12	A. J. Harris	5 ft 9 in (1.75 m)	170 lb (77 kg)	RS So	Dunbar HS; Ohio State	Dayton, OH
G	13	Sidy N'Dir	6 ft 2 in (1.88 m)	190 lb (86 kg)	RS Jr	West Oaks Academy	Cosne-Cours-sur-Loire, France
G	15	Joe Garza (W)	6 ft 0 in (1.83 m)	185 lb (84 kg)	Sr	Las Cruces HS	Las Cruces, NM
F	22	Eli Chuha	6 ft 7 in (2.01 m)	230 lb (104 kg)	RS Jr	Redlands East Valley HS	Redlands, CA
G/F	23	Zach Lofton	6 ft 4 in (1.93 m)	180 lb (82 kg)	RS Sr	Columbia Heights HS; Texas Southern	Saint Paul, MN
C	24	Leston Gordon	6 ft 8 in (2.03 m)	215 lb (98 kg)	Jr	Tunapuna Secondary; Lee CC	Tunapuna, Trinidad and Tobago
F	35	Johnny McCants	6 ft 7 in (2.01 m)	220 lb (100 kg)	RS Fr	Oñate HS	Las Cruces, NM
F		C. J. Bobbitt (I)	6 ft 7 in (2.01 m)	225 lb (102 kg)	Jr	Harker Heights HS; Denver	Killeen, TX
F		Robert Brown (redshirt)	6 ft 9 in (2.06 m)	238 lb (108 kg)	Fr	Advanced Preparatory International	Dallas, TX
G		Jabari Rice (redshirt)	6 ft 4 in (1.93 m)	160 lb (73 kg)	Fr	Marshall HS	Houston, TX
G		JoJo Zamora (I)	6 ft 2 in (1.88 m)	175 lb (79 kg)	Sr	Newark Memorial HS; Utah	Oakland, CA

Head coach

- Chris Jans (Loras)

Assistant coach(es)

- Lou Gudino (Incarnate Word)
- David Anwar (Fitchburg State)
- Jeff Mailhot (San Jacinto)

Legend

- (C) Team captain
- (S) Suspended
- (I) Ineligible
- (W) Walk-on
- Injured
- Current redshirt

Roster
Last update: November 9, 2017

== Schedule and results ==
Date time, TV	Rank^{#}	Opponent^{#}	Result	Record	High points	High rebounds	High assists	Site (attendance) city, state
Exhibition
Nov 1, 2017*; 7:00 pm		Southeastern Oklahoma State	W 90–83		–	–	–	Pan American Center; Las Cruces, NM
Nov 5, 2017*; 12:00 pm		vs. Texas Tech; Charity exhibition benefiting Greater Houston Community Foundation	L 54–84		–	–	–	Chaparral Center; Midland, TX
Regular season
Nov 10, 2017*; 7:00 pm		East Central	W 81–55	1–0	25 – Lofton	19 – J. Jones	6 – Harris	Pan American Center (3,920); Las Cruces, NM
Nov 13, 2017*; 8:00 pm, CHN		at No. 21 Saint Mary's	L 74–93	1–1	18 – Lofton	10 – J. Jones	4 – Harris	McKeon Pavilion (2,811); Moraga, CA
Nov 17, 2017*; 7:00 pm		New Mexico; Rio Grande Rivalry	W 75–56	2–1	28 – Lofton	16 – J. Jones	2 – 6 tied	Pan American Center (6,839); Las Cruces, NM
Nov 22, 2017*; 7:00 pm		Colorado State	W 89–76	3–1	30 – Lofton	8 – Lofton	5 – Harris	Pan American Center (3,883); Las Cruces, NM
Nov 25, 2017*; 7:00 pm		UTEP; Battle of I-10	W 72–63	4–1	21 – Lofton	8 – Lofton	4 – J. Jones	Pan American Center (6,069); Las Cruces, NM
Nov 30, 2017*; 8:00 pm, Stadium		at UTEP; Battle of I-10	W 80–60	5–1	18 – Harris	13 – J. Jones	3 – N'Dir	Don Haskins Center (7,078); El Paso, TX
Dec 3, 2017*; 4:00 pm		Prairie View A&M	W 69–57	6–1	18 – J. Jones	12 – J. Jones	4 – Harris	Pan American Center (3,591); Las Cruces, NM
Dec 6, 2017*; 7:00 pm		San Diego	L 60–65	6–2	16 – N'Dir	11 – J. Jones	3 – Tied	Pan American Center (3,798); Las Cruces, NM
Dec 9, 2017*; 7:00 pm, ESPN3		at New Mexico; Rio Grande Rivalry	W 65–62	7–2	22 – Lofton	10 – Tied	3 – Harris	Dreamstyle Arena (12,768); Albuquerque, NM
Dec 12, 2017*; 7:00 pm		Eastern New Mexico	W 84–62	8–2	29 – Lofton	11 – J. Jones	11 – J. Jones	Pan American Center (3,431); Las Cruces, NM
Dec 16, 2017*; 6:00 pm, BTN		vs. Illinois; Lou Henson Classic	W 74–69	9–2	23 – Lofton	13 – J. Jones	3 – Chuha	United Center (5,695); Chicago, IL
Dec 22, 2017*; 9:00 pm, ESPNU		vs. Davidson; Diamond Head Classic quarterfinals	W 69–68	10–2	13 – Tied	8 – Tied	3 – Chuha	Stan Sheriff Center (7,669); Honolulu, HI
Dec 23, 2017*; 8:00 pm, ESPN2		vs. No. 6 Miami (FL); Diamond Head Classic semifinals	W 63–54	11–2	15 – Lofton	9 – Lofton	3 – Lofton	Stan Sheriff Center (5,946); Honolulu, HI
Dec 25, 2017*; 4:00 pm, ESPN2		vs. USC; Diamond Head Classic championship game	L 72–77	11–3	28 – Lofton	11 – J. Jones	8 – J. Jones	Stan Sheriff Center (6,062); Honolulu, HI
Dec 28, 2017*; 8:00 pm		at UC Irvine	W 65–60	12–3	17 – Lofton	14 – J. Jones	4 – J. Jones	Bren Events Center (2,036); Irvine, CA
Jan 6, 2018; 1:00 pm		at Chicago State	W 97–60	13–3 (1–0)	18 – J. Jones	16 – J. Jones	8 – Harris	Jones Convocation Center (563); Chicago, IL
Jan 11, 2018; 7:00 pm, ESPN3		at Grand Canyon	W 70–59	14–3 (2–0)	29 – Lofton	15 – J. Jones	3 – J. Jones	GCU Arena (7,521); Phoenix, AZ
Jan 13, 2018; 8:00 pm, ESPN3		at Cal State Bakersfield	W 66–53	15–3 (3–0)	28 – Lofton	8 – J. Jones	6 – Harris	Icardo Center (3,326); Bakersfield, CA
Jan 18, 2018; 7:00 pm, ESPN3		Seattle	W 75–62	16–3 (4–0)	15 – Lofton	11 – J. Jones	5 – Harris	Pan American Center (5,035); Las Cruces, NM
Jan 20, 2018; 4:00 pm, ESPN3		Utah Valley	W 86–59	17–3 (5–0)	24 – Lofton	10 – J. Jones	6 – J. Jones	Pan American Center (6,046); Las Cruces, NM
Jan 27, 2018; 6:00 pm		at UMKC	W 73–48	18–3 (6–0)	19 – Lofton	15 – J. Jones	3 – J. Jones	Municipal Auditorium (1,410); Kansas City, MO
Jan 30, 2018*; 7:00 pm		Northern New Mexico	W 71–45	19–3	14 – J. Jones	16 – J. Jones	6 – Buchanan	Pan American Center (4,094); Las Cruces, NM
Feb 3, 2018; 4:00 pm		Texas–Rio Grande Valley	W 90–67	20–3 (7–0)	34 – Lofton	20 – J. Jones	6 – Lofton	Pan American Center (5,115); Las Cruces, NM
Feb 8, 2018; 7:00 pm, ESPN3		Cal State Bakersfield	W 69–43	21–3 (8–0)	14 – Lofton	20 – J. Jones	3 – Tied	Pan American Center (4,206); Las Cruces, NM
Feb 10, 2018; 7:00 pm, ESPN3		Grand Canyon	W 74–70	22–3 (9–0)	27 – J. Jones	20 – J. Jones	2 – Harris	Pan American Center (12,989); Las Cruces, NM
Feb 15, 2018; 7:00 pm		at Utah Valley	L 79–86	22–4 (9–1)	19 – Lofton	6 – J. Jones	6 – N'Dir	UCCU Center (4,271); Orem, UT
Feb 17, 2018; 2:00 pm		at Seattle	L 63–73 ^{OT}	22–5 (9–2)	26 – Lofton	12 – Lofton	5 – Lofton	KeyArena (2,270); Seattle, WA
Feb 22, 2018; 7:00 pm		Chicago State	W 78–67	23–5 (10–2)	15 – N'Dir	11 – J. Jones	4 – J. Jones	Pan American Center (4,404); Las Cruces, NM
Feb 24, 2018; 7:00 pm		UMKC	W 82–58	24–5 (11–2)	15 – Tied	23 – J. Jones	7 – J. Jones	Pan American Center (5,989); Las Cruces, NM
Mar 3, 2018; 6:00 pm		at Texas–Rio Grande Valley	W 86–71	25–5 (12–2)	18 – J. Jones	13 – J. Jones	7 – Harris	UTRGV Fieldhouse (1,203); Edinburg, TX
WAC tournament
Mar 8, 2018; 7:00 pm, ESPN3	(1)	vs. (8) Chicago State; Quarterfinals	W 97–70	26–5	21 – Lofton	15 – J. Jones	8 – Buchanan	Orleans Arena (1,521); Paradise, NV
Mar 9, 2018; 9:30 pm, ESPN3	(1)	vs. (4) Seattle; Semifinals	W 84–79	27–5	31 – Lofton	22 – J. Jones	3 – Harris	Orleans Arena (2,739); Paradise, NV
Mar 10, 2018; 8:00 pm, ESPNU	(1)	vs. (3) Grand Canyon; Championship	W 72–58	28–5	21 – Lofton	18 – J. Jones	2 – Harris	Orleans Arena (3,065); Paradise, NV
NCAA tournament
Mar 16, 2018*; 7:57 pm, truTV	(12 MW)	vs. (5 MW) No. 20 Clemson; First Round	L 68–79	28–6	29 – Lofton	14 – Jones	4 – Jones	Viejas Arena (10,092); San Diego, CA
*Non-conference game. ^{#}Rankings from AP Poll. (#) Tournament seedings in parentheses. MW=Midwest Region. All times are in Mountain Time Source.
