= Jarkel Joiner =

American basketball player (born 1999)

No. 1 – Greensboro Swarm
- Position: Point guard
- League: NBA G League

Personal information
- Born: May 20, 1999 (age 27) Oxford, Mississippi, U.S.
- Listed height: 6 ft 1 in (1.85 m)
- Listed weight: 181 lb (82 kg)

Career information
- High school: Oxford (Oxford, Mississippi)
- College: Cal State Bakersfield (2017–2019); Ole Miss (2020–2022); NC State (2022–2023)
- NBA draft: 2023: undrafted
- Playing career: 2023–present

Career history
- 2023–2025: College Park Skyhawks
- 2025–2026: Raptors 905
- 2026: Vancouver Bandits
- 2026–present: Greensboro Swarm

Career highlights
- First-team All-WAC (2019); Second-team All-ACC (2023)
- Stats at NBA.com
- Stats at Basketball Reference

Jarkel Joiner (born May 20, 1999) is an American professional basketball player for the Greensboro Swarm of the NBA G League. He played college basketball for Cal State Bakersfield, Mississippi, and NC State. Joiner has previously played for the College Park Skyhawks and the Raptors 905.

== High school career ==
Joiner attended Oxford High School. As a senior, he ranked fourth nationally with 36.5 points per game. Joiner was named the 2017 Mississippi Boys Basketball Player of the Year by the Daily Journal, and helped lead the Chargers to the state semifinals. He was not highly recruited and committed to play college basketball at Cal State Bakersfield.

== College career ==
Joiner averaged 10.3 points per game as a freshman. As a sophomore, he averaged 15.6 points per game and was named to the First Team All-WAC. Joiner transferred to Ole Miss and sat out the season. He averaged 12 points and 2.6 rebounds per game as a junior. As a senior, Joiner averaged 13.2 points and 2.3 assists per game despite being hampered by a back injury. Following the season he transferred to NC State. Joiner averaged 17 points, 4.8 rebounds and 3.6 assists per game at NC State. He was named to the Second Team All-ACC and led the Wolfpack to the NCAA Tournament for the first time since 2018.

== Professional career ==
=== College Park Skyhawks (2023–2025) ===
After going undrafted in the 2023 NBA draft, Joiner joined the Atlanta Hawks for the 2023 NBA Summer League and on October 4, 2023, he signed with them However, he was waived on October 8 and joined the team's G League affiliate the College Park Skyhawks on October 29.

On October 15, 2024, Joiner signed with the Atlanta Hawks, but was waived the next day. On October 26, he re-joined the College Park Skyhawks.

=== Raptors 905 (2025–2026) ===
On October 27, 2025, Joiner joined the Raptors 905.

=== Vancouver Bandits (2026) ===
On May 23, 2026, Joiner signed with the Vancouver Bandits of the Canadian Elite Basketball League (CEBL).

=== Greensboro Swarm (2026–present) ===
On September 3, 2026, Joiner signed an Exhibit 10 contract with the Charlotte Hornets, only to be waived the following day. He subsequently joined the Greensboro Swarm for the 2026–27 NBA G League season.

== Career statistics ==
Legend
GP	Games played	GS	Games started	MPG	Minutes per game
FG%	Field goal percentage	3P%	3-point field goal percentage	FT%	Free throw percentage
RPG	Rebounds per game	APG	Assists per game	SPG	Steals per game
BPG	Blocks per game	PPG	Points per game	**Bold**	Career high

=== College ===
Year	Team	GP	GS	MPG	FG%	3P%	FT%	RPG	APG	SPG	BPG	PPG
2017–18	Cal State Bakersfield	30	27	28.0	.379	.286	**.908**	3.4	.7	.5	.0	10.4
2018–19	Cal State Bakersfield	**34**	**34**	32.2	**.451**	**.370**	.710	3.6	1.4	1.1	**.1**	15.6
2019–20	Ole Miss	Redshirt										
2020–21	Ole Miss	28	24	30.6	.390	.261	.845	2.6	1.7	1.1	**.1**	12.0
2021–22	Ole Miss	22	17	31.0	.410	.340	.825	3.0	2.3	1.2	.0	13.2
2022–23	NC State	**34**	**34**	**35.9**	.428	.354	.853	**4.8**	**3.6**	**1.3**	**.1**	**17.0**
Career		148	136	31.7	.417	.330	.828	3.5	2.0	1.0	.1	13.8
