= 2017–18 Cal State Bakersfield Roadrunners men's basketball team =

American college basketball season

2017–18 Cal State Bakersfield Roadrunners men's basketball
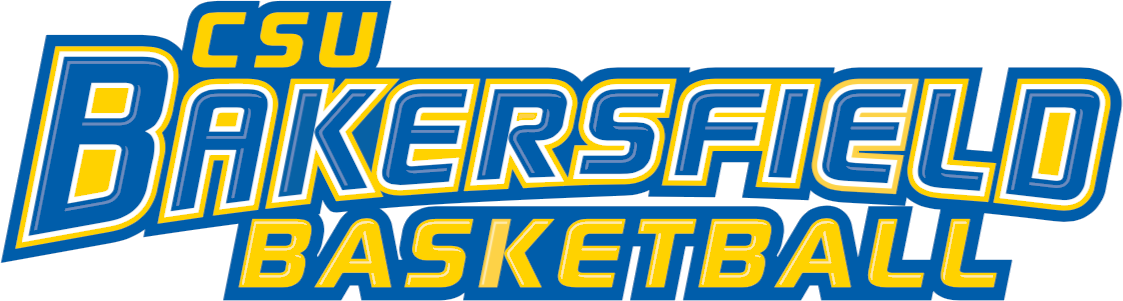
- Conference: Western Athletic Conference
- Record: 12–18 (5–9 WAC)
- Head coach: Rod Barnes (7th season)
- Assistant coaches: Jeff Conarroe; Benjy Taylor; Mike Scott
- Home arena: Icardo Center

2017–18 WAC men's basketball standings
| | Conf. | | | | Overall |
| Team | W | | L | PCT | W | | L | PCT |
|---|---|---|---|---|---|---|---|---|
| New Mexico State † | 12 | – | 2 | .857 | 28 | – | 6 | .824 |
| Utah Valley | 10 | – | 4 | .714 | 23 | – | 11 | .676 |
| Grand Canyon | 9 | – | 5 | .643 | 22 | – | 12 | .647 |
| Seattle | 8 | – | 6 | .571 | 20 | – | 14 | .588 |
| Texas–Rio Grande Valley | 6 | – | 8 | .429 | 15 | – | 18 | .455 |
| Cal State Bakersfield | 5 | – | 9 | .357 | 12 | – | 18 | .400 |
| UMKC | 5 | – | 9 | .357 | 10 | – | 22 | .313 |
| Chicago State | 1 | – | 13 | .071 | 3 | – | 29 | .094 |
† 2018 WAC tournament winner

The 2017–18 Cal State Bakersfield Roadrunners men's basketball team represented California State University, Bakersfield during the 2017–18 NCAA Division I men's basketball season. The Roadrunners, led by seventh-year head coach Rod Barnes, played their home games at the Icardo Center as members of the Western Athletic Conference. They finished the season 12–18, 5–9 in WAC play to finish in a tie for sixth place. They lost in the quarterfinals of the WAC tournament to Utah Valley.

== Previous season ==
The Roadrunners finished the 2016–17 season 25–10, 12–2 in WAC play to win the regular season WAC championship. They defeated Utah Valley to advance to the championship game of the WAC tournament where they lost to New Mexico State. As a regular season conference champion who failed to win their conference tournament, they received an automatic bid to the National Invitation Tournament. As a No. 8 seed, they defeated California, Colorado State, and Texas–Arlington to become the first No. 8 seed to advance to the semifinals since the NIT introduced seeding in 2006. In the semifinals at Madison Square Garden they lost to Georgia Tech.

== Offseason ==
=== Departures ===
| Name | Number | Pos. | Height | Weight | Year | Hometown | Reason for departure |
|---|---|---|---|---|---|---|---|
| Matt Smith | 0 | F | 6'6" | 190 | RS Senior | Jackson, MS | Graduated |
| Dedrick Basile | 5 | G | 5'10" | 160 | Senior | Houston, TX | Graduated |
| Jaylin Airington | 11 | F | 6'4" | 190 | RS Senior | East Chicago, IN | Graduated |
| Justin Pride | 51 | G | 5'10" | 180 | Senior | Huntsville, AL | Graduated |

=== Incoming transfers ===
| Name | Number | Pos. | Height | Weight | Year | Hometown | Previous School |
|---|---|---|---|---|---|---|---|
| Ricky Holden | 2 | G | 5'10" | | Junior | Ellisville, MS | Junior college transferred from Jones County JC |

== 2017 recruiting class ==
College recruiting information
| Name | Hometown | School | Height | Weight | Commit date |
|---|---|---|---|---|---|
| Darrin Persons #92 PF | Clovis, CA | Immanuel High School | 6 ft 5 in (1.96 m) | 215 lb (98 kg) | Aug 8, 2015 |
| Darrin Persons #92 PF | Recruit ratings: Scout: Rivals: (64) | | | | |
| Justin McCall; SG | Bakersfield, CA | Ridgeview High School | 6 ft 5 in (1.96 m) | 180 lb (82 kg) | Aug 15, 2016 |
| Justin McCall; SG | Recruit ratings: Scout: Rivals: (NR) | | | | |
| Jarkel Joiner; PG | Oxford, MS | Oxford High School | 6 ft 1 in (1.85 m) | 168 lb (76 kg) | Oct 22, 2016 |
| Jarkel Joiner; PG | Recruit ratings: Scout: Rivals: (NR) | | | | |
Overall recruit ranking:
Note: In many cases, Scout, Rivals, 247Sports, On3, and ESPN may conflict in their listings of height and weight.; In these cases, the average was taken. ESPN grades are on a 100-point scale.; Sources: "2017 Team Ranking". Rivals.

=== 2018 recruiting class ===
College recruiting information (2018)
| Name | Hometown | School | Height | Weight | Commit date |
|---|---|---|---|---|---|
| Ronnie Stapp; SF | Bakersfield, CA | Bakersfield High School | 6 ft 65 in (3.48 m) | 195 lb (88 kg) | Apr 1, 2016 |
| Ronnie Stapp; SF | Recruit ratings: Scout: Rivals: (NR) | | | | |
Overall recruit ranking:
Note: In many cases, Scout, Rivals, 247Sports, On3, and ESPN may conflict in their listings of height and weight.; In these cases, the average was taken. ESPN grades are on a 100-point scale.; Sources: "2018 Team Ranking". Rivals.

== Roster ==
2017–18 Cal State Bakersfield Roadrunners men's basketball team
Players
Coaches

| Pos. | # | Name | Height | Weight | Year | Previous school | Hometown |
|---|---|---|---|---|---|---|---|
| G | 0 | Jarkel Joiner | 6 ft 1 in (1.85 m) | 170 lb (77 kg) | Fr | Oxford HS | Oxford, MS |
| G | 1 | Brent Wrapp | 6 ft 3 in (1.91 m) | 175 lb (79 kg) | RS Sr | Fairview HS | Boulder, CO |
| G | 2 | Rickey Holden | 5 ft 10 in (1.78 m) | 170 lb (77 kg) | Jr | Laurel HS; Jones County JC | Laurel, MS |
| F | 3 | Tazé Moore | 6 ft 5 in (1.96 m) | 180 lb (82 kg) | So | Southaven HS | Southaven, MS |
| F | 4 | James Suber | 6 ft 7 in (2.01 m) | 210 lb (95 kg) | Sr | Philadelphia Electrical & Tech Charter HS; Panola CC | Philadelphia, PA |
| G | 5 | Jeremiah Dickerson (W) | 5 ft 10 in (1.78 m) | 150 lb (68 kg) | Fr | Bakersfield HS | Bakersfield, CA |
| G/F | 10 | Justin Davis | 6 ft 4 in (1.93 m) | 180 lb (82 kg) | RS Fr | Morse HS | San Diego, CA |
| G/F | 11 | Justin McCall | 6 ft 5 in (1.96 m) | 205 lb (93 kg) | Fr | Ridgeview HS | Bakersfield, CA |
| G/F | 13 | Shon Briggs | 6 ft 6 in (1.98 m) | 200 lb (91 kg) | Sr | Heritage HS; CC of San Francisco | Brentwood, CA |
| C | 15 | Fallou Ndoye | 6 ft 11 in (2.11 m) | 225 lb (102 kg) | RS Sr | Findlay Prep; Mississippi State | Ta'if, Senegal |
| G | 21 | Greg Lee | 6 ft 7 in (2.01 m) | 200 lb (91 kg) | RS Fr | Westside HS | Houston, TX |
| C | 22 | Moataz Aly | 6 ft 10 in (2.08 m) | 205 lb (93 kg) | Sr | Sunrise Christian Academy; Hutchinson CC | Alexandria, Egypt |
| G | 23 | Damiyne Durham | 6 ft 4 in (1.93 m) | 175 lb (79 kg) | RS Jr | Oakwood HS | Oakwood, TX |
| F | 24 | Bray Barnes (W) | 6 ft 5 in (1.96 m) | 185 lb (84 kg) | RS Jr | Liberty HS | Bakersfield, CA |
| F | 25 | Darrin Person, Jr. | 6 ft 6 in (1.98 m) | 215 lb (98 kg) | Fr | Immanuel HS | Fresno, CA |
| F | 35 | Cartrell Thompson | 6 ft 8 in (2.03 m) | 195 lb (88 kg) | Fr | Price HS | Compton, CA |

Head coach

- Rod Barnes (Mississippi)

Assistant coach(es)

- Jeff Conarroe (Colorado College)
- Benjy Taylor (Richmond)
- Mike Scott (Fairleigh Dickinson)

Legend

- (C) Team captain
- (S) Suspended
- (I) Ineligible
- (W) Walk-on
- Injured
- Current redshirt

Roster
Last update: November 9, 2017

== Schedule and results ==
| Date time, TV | Rank^{#} | Opponent^{#} | Result | Record | Site (attendance) city, state |
Exhibition
| Oct 30, 2017*; 8:00 pm | | at Long Beach State; Community Foundation of Sonoma County | W 63–55 | | Walter Pyramid (4,227); Long Beach, CA |
| Nov 4, 2017*; 7:00 pm | | Biola | W 84–64 | | Icardo Center; Bakersfield, CA |
Non-conference regular season
| Nov 10, 2017*; 7:00 pm | | Whittier | W 88–66 | 1–0 | Icardo Center (2,306); Bakersfield, CA |
| Nov 13, 2017*; 4:30 pm | | at Georgia Southern | L 53–77 | 1–1 | Hanner Fieldhouse (2,423); Statesboro, GA |
| Nov 16, 2017*; 7:00 pm, P12N | | at No. 3 Arizona | L 59–91 | 1–2 | McKale Center (14,301); Tucson, AZ |
| Nov 19, 2017*; 1:00 pm, ESPN3 | | at Lamar | W 85–73 | 2–2 | Montagne Center (1,500); Beaumont, TX |
| Nov 22, 2017*; 9:00 pm | | at Alaska Anchorage; Great Alaska Shootout quarterfinals | W 59–39 | 3–2 | Alaska Airlines Center (2,732); Anchorage, AK |
| Nov 24, 2017*; 9:00 pm | | vs. Idaho; Great Alaska Shootout semifinals | W 64–62 | 4–2 | Alaska Airlines Center (3,082); Anchorage, AK |
| Nov 25, 2017*; 8:59 pm | | vs. Central Michigan; Great Alaska Shootout championship game | L 72–75 | 4–3 | Alaska Airlines Center (3,962); Anchorage, AK |
| Nov 29, 2017*; 7:00 pm, P12N | | at UCLA | L 66–75 | 4–4 | Pauley Pavilion (5,973); Los Angeles, CA |
| Dec 2, 2017*; 7:00 pm, ESPN3 | | Northern Arizona | L 52–60 | 4–5 | Icardo Center (2,509); Bakersfield, CA |
| Dec 5, 2017*; 7:00 pm | | at Fresno State | L 55–70 | 4–6 | Save Mart Center (5,040); Fresno, CA |
| Dec 8, 2017*; 11:00 am | | Life Pacific | W 100–71 | 5–6 | Icardo Center (3,497); Bakersfield, CA |
| Dec 9, 2017*; 7:00 pm, ESPN3 | | Idaho | W 66–55 | 6–6 | Icardo Center (2,633); Bakersfield, CA |
| Dec 16, 2017*; 2:00 pm, ESPN3 | | Georgia Southern | W 55–53 | 7–6 | Icardo Center (2,588); Bakersfield, CA |
| Dec 20, 2017*; 4:00 pm | | at Delaware | L 62–76 | 7–7 | Bob Carpenter Center (1,922); Newark, DE |
| Dec 27, 2017*; 5:00 pm, SECN | | at Arkansas | L 68–95 | 7–8 | Bud Walton Arena (15,829); Fayetteville, AR |
WAC regular season
| Jan 6, 2018; 6:00 pm | | at Utah Valley | L 42–75 | 7–9 (0–1) | UCCU Center (3,178); Orem, UT |
| Jan 11, 2018; 7:00 pm, ESPN3 | | Texas–Rio Grande Valley | L 74–87 | 7–10 (0–2) | Icardo Center (2,603); Bakersfield, CA |
| Jan 13, 2018; 7:00 pm, ESPN3 | | New Mexico State | L 53–66 | 7–11 (0–3) | Icardo Center (3,326); Bakersfield, CA |
| Jan 18, 2018; 5:00 pm | | at UMKC | L 59–62 | 7–12 (0–4) | Municipal Auditorium (1,003); Kansas City, MO |
| Jan 20, 2018; 12:00 pm | | at Chicago State | W 89–78 | 8–12 (1–4) | Jones Convocation Center (363); Chicago, IL |
| Jan 26, 2018; 7:00 pm | | at Seattle | L 55-59 | 8-13 (1-5) | KeyArena (4,448); Seattle, WA |
| Feb 1, 2018; 7:00 pm, ESPN3 | | Chicago State | W 91–61 | 9–13 (2–5) | Icardo Center (2,343); Bakersfield, CA |
| Feb 3, 2018; 7:00 pm, ESPN3 | | at UMKC | W 81–58 | 10–13 (3–5) | Icardo Center (3,209); Bakersfield, CA |
| Feb 8, 2018; 7:00 pm, ESPN3 | | at New Mexico State | L 43–69 | 10–14 (3–6) | Pan American Center (4,206); Las Cruces, NM |
| Feb 10, 2018; 5:00 pm | | at Texas–Rio Grand Valley | L 66–68 | 10–15 (3–7) | UTRGV Fieldhouse (1,175); Edinburg, TX |
| Feb 17, 2018; 7:00 pm, ESPN3 | | Grand Canyon | W 71–58 | 11–15 (4–7) | Icardo Center (3,002); Bakersfield, CA |
| Feb 22, 2018; 7:00 pm, ESPN3 | | Utah Valley | L 47–70 | 11–16 (4–8) | Icardo Center (2,644); Bakersfield, CA |
| Feb 24, 2018; 6:00 pm, ESPN3 | | Seattle | W 64–57 | 12–16 (5–8) | Icardo Center (2,887); Bakersfield, CA |
| Mar 3, 2018; 6:00 pm, ESPN3 | | at Grand Canyon | L 68–81 | 12–17 (5–9) | GCU Arena (7,372); Phoenix, AZ |
WAC tournament
| Mar 8, 2018; 2:30 pm, ESPN3 | (7) | vs. (2) Utah Valley; Quarterfinals | L 74–81 | 12–18 | Orleans Arena (1,508); Paradise, NV |
*Non-conference game. ^{#}Rankings from AP Poll. (#) Tournament seedings in parentheses. All times are in Pacific Time.
