= 2018 College Basketball Invitational =

College basketball tournament

- Teams: 16
- Finals site: War Memorial Gymnasium; The Super Pit, San Francisco, California; Denton, Texas
- Champions: North Texas Mean Green (1st title)
- Runner-up: San Francisco Dons (1st title game)
- Semifinalists: Jacksonville State Gamecocks (1st semifinal); Campbell Fighting Camels (1st semifinal)
- Winning coach: Grant McCasland (1st title)
- MVP: Roosevelt Smart (North Texas)
- Attendance: 35,348

The 2018 College Basketball Invitational (CBI) was a single-elimination men's college basketball tournament consisting of 16 National Collegiate Athletic Association (NCAA) Division I teams that did not participate in the 2018 NCAA Men's Division I Basketball Tournament or the NIT. It was held from March 13 through March 30, 2018 in various arenas. This marked the 11th year the Tournament had been held.

North Texas defeated San Francisco two games to one in the best-of-three championship series to win the CBI championship.

== Participating teams ==
The following teams were announced as participants Sunday, March 11 after the NCAA Selection Show.

Team	Conference	Overall record	Conference record
Campbell	Big South	16–15	10–8
Canisius	MAAC	21–11	15–3
Central Arkansas	Southland	17–16	10–8
Colgate	Patriot	19–13	12–6
Eastern Washington	Big Sky	20–14	13–5
Grand Canyon	WAC	22–11	9–5
Jacksonville State	Ohio Valley	21–12	11–7
Miami (OH)	Mid-American	16–17	8–10
Mercer	Southern	18–14	11–7
New Orleans	Southland	15–16	11–7
North Texas	C-USA	15–17	8–10
San Francisco	West Coast	18–15	9–9
Seattle	WAC	20–13	8–6
South Dakota	Summit	26–8	11–3
UT Rio Grande Valley	WAC	15–17	6–8
Utah Valley	WAC	22–10	10–4

=== Declined invitations ===
The following programs received an invitation to the CBI, but declined to participate:

- Bradley
- Georgetown
- Maryland
- Northeastern
- Oakland
- SMU
- Toledo
- Tulsa
- VCU
- Weber State

== Format ==
The 2018 CBI had 16 teams organized into four regional brackets of four teams. The four teams that advanced to the semifinals were reseeded. The finals were a best-of-three series.

The participants were announced Sunday, March 11 after the NCAA Selection Show.

== Schedule ==
Date	Time*	Matchup	Television	Score	Attendance
First round
March 13	9:00 pm	Eastern Washington at **Utah Valley**	WAC DN	65–87	997
March 14	7:00 pm	Miami (OH) at **Campbell**	Big South Net	87–97	1,411
March 14	7:00 pm	**Jacksonville State** at Canisius	ESPN3	80–78^{OT}	870
March 14	8:00 pm	**North Texas** at South Dakota	GoYotes	90–77	1,348
March 14	8:00 pm	UT Rio Grande Valley at **New Orleans**	Southland DN	74–77	741
March 14	10:00 pm	Colgate at **San Francisco**	TheW.tv	68–72	1,339
March 14	10:00 pm	**Mercer** at Grand Canyon	YurView AZ; ESPN3	78–73	5,941
March 14	10:00 pm	**Central Arkansas** at Seattle	WAC DN	92–90^{OT}	639
Quarterfinals
March 19	6:30 pm	**Jacksonville State** at Central Arkansas	UCA Channel 6 Southland DN	80–59	2,570
March 19	7:00 pm	New Orleans at **Campbell**	Big South Net	69–71	1,316
March 19	8:00 pm	Mercer at **North Texas**	ESPN3	67–96	1,145
March 19	10:00 pm	Utah Valley at **San Francisco**	TheW.tv	73–78	1,239
Semifinals
March 21	8:00 pm	Jacksonville State at **North Texas**	ESPN3	68–90	2,784
March 22	10:00 pm	Campbell at **San Francisco**	ESPN3	62–65	1,163
Finals
March 26	10:00 pm	North Texas at **San Francisco**	ESPNU	62–72	1,358
March 28	8:30 pm	San Francisco at **North Texas**	ESPNU	55–69	4,196
March 30	7:00 pm	San Francisco at **North Texas**	ESPNU	77–88	6,291
*All times are listed as Eastern Daylight Time (UTC-4). Winning team in **bold**.

== Bracket ==
First round March 13–14
South Dakota	77
North Texas	90
Grand Canyon	73
Mercer	78
Seattle	90
Central Arkansas	92*
Canisius	78
Jacksonville State	80*
San Francisco	72
Colgate	68
Utah Valley	87
Eastern Washington	65
Campbell	97
Miami (OH)	87
New Orleans	77
Texas–Rio Grande Valley	74

Quarterfinals; March 19
North Texas	96
Mercer	67
Central Arkansas	59
Jacksonville State	80
San Francisco	78
Utah Valley	73
Campbell	71
New Orleans	69

Semifinals (Reseeded); March 21–22
North Texas	90
Jacksonville State	68
San Francisco	65
Campbell	62

Finals (Best of three); March 26, 28, 30
North Texas	62	69	88
San Francisco	72	55	77

Home teams listed first.
* Denotes overtime period.
