= 2018 WAC men's basketball tournament =

- Classification: Division I
- Season: 2017–18
- Teams: 8
- Site: Orleans Arena; Paradise, Nevada
- Champions: New Mexico State (8th title)
- Winning coach: Chris Jans (1st title)
- MVP: Jemerrio Jones (New Mexico State)
- Television: ESPN3, ESPNU

2017–18 WAC men's basketball standings
	Conf.				Overall
Team	W		L	PCT	W		L	PCT
New Mexico State †	12	–	2	.857	28	–	6	.824
Utah Valley	10	–	4	.714	23	–	11	.676
Grand Canyon	9	–	5	.643	22	–	12	.647
Seattle	8	–	6	.571	20	–	14	.588
Texas–Rio Grande Valley	6	–	8	.429	15	–	18	.455
Cal State Bakersfield	5	–	9	.357	12	–	18	.400
UMKC	5	–	9	.357	10	–	22	.313
Chicago State	1	–	13	.071	3	–	29	.094
† 2018 WAC tournament winner

The 2018 WAC men's basketball tournament was the postseason men's basketball tournament for the Western Athletic Conference for the 2017–18 season. All tournament games will be played at the Orleans Arena in Paradise, Nevada, from March 8–10, 2018. The winner of the tournament will receive the conference's automatic bid to the NCAA tournament. Regular-season champion New Mexico State also won the WAC Tournament championship and received the conference's automatic bid to the NCAA tournament.

== Seeds ==
All eight teams in the WAC were eligible to compete in the conference tournament. Teams were seeded by record within the conference, with a tiebreaker system to seed teams with identical conference records.

Seed	School	Conference	Tiebreaker	Tiebreaker 2
1	New Mexico State	12–2		
2	Utah Valley	10–4		
3	Grand Canyon	9–5		
4	Seattle	8–6		
5	UT Rio Grande Valley	6–8		
6	UMKC	5–9	1–1 vs. CSUB	1–1 vs. UVU
7	Cal State Bakersfield	5–9	1–1 vs. UMKC	0–2 vs. UVU
8	Chicago State	1–13		

== Schedule and results ==
Game	Time	Matchup	Score	Television
Quarterfinals – Thursday, March 8
1	12:00 pm	No. 3 Grand Canyon vs No. 6 UMKC	77–74	ESPN3
2	2:30 pm	No. 2 Utah Valley vs No. 7 Cal State Bakersfield	81–74	ESPN3
3	6:00 pm	No. 1 New Mexico State vs No. 8 Chicago State	97–70	ESPN3
4	8:30 pm	No. 4 Seattle vs No. 5 UT Rio Grande Valley	77–60	ESPN3
Semifinals – Friday, March 9
5	6:00 pm	No. 3 Grand Canyon vs No. 2 Utah Valley	75–60	ESPN3
6	8:30 pm	No. 1 New Mexico State vs No. 4 Seattle	84–79	ESPN3
Final – Saturday, March 10
7	7:00 pm	No. 3 Grand Canyon vs No. 1 New Mexico State	58–72	ESPNU
Game times in PST. Rankings denote tournament seed.

== Bracket ==
Quarterfinals; March 8 ESPN3
1	New Mexico State	97
8	Chicago State	70
4	Seattle	77
5	UT Rio Grande Valley	60
2	Utah Valley	81
7	Cal State Bakersfield	74
3	Grand Canyon	77
6	UMKC	74

Semifinals; March 9 ESPN3
1	New Mexico State	84
4	Seattle	79
2	Utah Valley	60
3	Grand Canyon	75

Championship; March 10; ESPNU
1	New Mexico State	72
3	Grand Canyon	58
