= 2017–18 Grand Canyon Antelopes men's basketball team =

American college basketball season

2017–18 Grand Canyon Antelopes men's basketball

CBI, First round
- Conference: Western Athletic Conference
- Record: 22–12 (9–5 WAC)
- Head coach: Dan Majerle (5th season)
- Assistant coaches: Todd Lee; Chris Crevelone; T. J. Benson
- Home arena: GCU Arena

2017–18 WAC men's basketball standings
	Conf.				Overall
Team	W		L	PCT	W		L	PCT
New Mexico State †	12	–	2	.857	28	–	6	.824
Utah Valley	10	–	4	.714	23	–	11	.676
Grand Canyon	9	–	5	.643	22	–	12	.647
Seattle	8	–	6	.571	20	–	14	.588
Texas–Rio Grande Valley	6	–	8	.429	15	–	18	.455
Cal State Bakersfield	5	–	9	.357	12	–	18	.400
UMKC	5	–	9	.357	10	–	22	.313
Chicago State	1	–	13	.071	3	–	29	.094
† 2018 WAC tournament winner

The 2017–18 Grand Canyon Antelopes men's basketball team represented Grand Canyon University during the 2017–18 NCAA Division I men's basketball season. They were led by head coach Dan Majerle in his fifth season at Grand Canyon. The Antelopes played their home games at the GCU Arena in Phoenix, Arizona as members of the Western Athletic Conference. They finished the season 22–12, 9–5 in WAC play to finish in third place. They defeated UMKC and Utah Valley to advance to the championship game of the WAC tournament where they lost to New Mexico. They were invited to the College Basketball Invitational where they lost in the first round to Mercer.

The season marked the Antelopes' first full season as a Division I school after a four-year transition period from Division II to Division I. This means the team was officially eligible for the NCAA tournament if they had qualified, as well as becoming fully eligible for the WAC tournament.

== Previous season ==
The Antelopes finished the 2016–17 season 22–9, 11–3 in WAC play to finish in a tie for second place. Citing injuries, they decided to not participate in a postseason tournament. They had participated in the CIT the previous three seasons.

== Offseason ==
=== Departures ===
Name	Number	Pos.	Height	Weight	Year	Hometown	Notes
Darion Clark	23	F	6'7"	235	RS Senior	Conyers, GA	Graduated
DeWayne Russell	0	G	5'11"	155	RS Senior	Peoria, AZ	Graduated

=== Incoming transfers ===
Name	Pos.	Height	Weight	Year	Hometown	Note	Previous School
Casey Benson	G	6'3"	185	Jr.	Tempe, AZ	Graduate transfer from Oregon. Immediately eligible with one year eligibility.	Oregon

=== Incoming recruits ===
College recruiting
Name	Hometown	School	Height	Weight	Commit date
Damarion Milstead; PG	Hayward, CA	Moreau Catholic High School	6 ft 2 in (1.88 m)	155 lb (70 kg)	Mar 1, 2016
Damarion Milstead; PG	Recruit ratings: Scout: Rivals: 247Sports: ESPN: (79)				
Roberts Blumbergs; PF	Latvia	Get Better Academy	6 ft 10 in (2.08 m)	209 lb (95 kg)	Jun 26, 2016
Roberts Blumbergs; PF	Recruit ratings: No ratings found				
Alessandro Lever; PF	Bolzano, Italy	Istituto Secchi	6 ft 10 in (2.08 m)	209 lb (95 kg)	Mar 14, 2017
Alessandro Lever; PF	Recruit ratings: No ratings found				
Overall recruit ranking:
Note: In many cases, Scout, Rivals, 247Sports, On3, and ESPN may conflict in their listings of height and weight.; In these cases, the average was taken. ESPN grades are on a 100-point scale.; Sources: "2017 Team Ranking". Rivals.

== Roster ==
2017–18 Grand Canyon Antelopes men's basketball team
Players
Coaches

Pos.	#	Name	Height	Weight	Year	Previous school	Hometown
G	--	Adrian Carrion Armas (W)	5 ft 11 in (1.8 m)	173 lb (78 kg)	Sr	Canarias Basketball Academy	Seville, Spain
G	0	Shaq Carr	6 ft 2 in (1.88 m)	172 lb (78 kg)	Sr	Canyon Springs; College of Southern Idaho	Las Vegas, NV
G	1	Fiifi Aidoo	6 ft 2 in (1.88 m)	200 lb (91 kg)	So	Helsinki Basketball Academy	Helsinki, Finland
G	2	Joshua Braun	6 ft 4 in (1.93 m)	220 lb (100 kg)	RS Sr	Westwind Prep Academy	Anthem, AZ
G	3	Parker Dale	6 ft 4 in (1.93 m)	205 lb (93 kg)	Fr	Scots College	Sydney, Australia
F	4	Oscar Frayer	6 ft 6 in (1.98 m)	191 lb (87 kg)	So	Moreau Catholic	Hayward, CA
F	5	Matt Jackson	6 ft 8 in (2.03 m)	230 lb (104 kg)	RS Jr	Diamond Valley	Diamond Creek, Australia
G	10	Damari Milstead	6 ft 2 in (1.88 m)	160 lb (73 kg)	Fr	Moreau Catholic HS	Hayward, CA
G	11	Casey Benson	6 ft 3 in (1.91 m)	185 lb (84 kg)	Sr	Corona del Sol HS; Oregon	Tempe, AZ
F	12	Roberts Blumbergs	6 ft 10 in (2.08 m)	220 lb (100 kg)	Fr	GBA (Prague)	Ventspils, Latvia
G	13	Ibrahima Sankaré	6 ft 7 in (2.01 m)	200 lb (91 kg)	RS Fr	SEED Academy	Thiès, Senegal
G	15	Cheick Sy-Savane	6 ft 3 in (1.91 m)	180 lb (82 kg)	Sr	Our Savior New American	Harlem, NY
F	21	Kerwin Smith	6 ft 9 in (2.06 m)	222 lb (101 kg)	RS Jr	Woodrow Wilson	Dallas, TX
G	22	Nehemiah Allen (W)	6 ft 6 in (1.98 m)	170 lb (77 kg)	So	Lake Oswego	Lake Oswego, OR
F	24	Keonta Vernon	6 ft 6 in (1.98 m)	242 lb (110 kg)	Sr	Tulare Union; College of Southern Idaho	Tulare, CA
F	25	Alessandro Lever	6 ft 10 in (2.08 m)	230 lb (104 kg)	Fr	Istituto Secchi, Reggio Emilia	Bolzano, Italy
G	35	Kenzo Nudo	6 ft 4 in (1.93 m)	204 lb (93 kg)	RS So	Chaparral	Scottsdale, AZ
G	42	Gerard Martin	6 ft 6 in (1.98 m)	223 lb (101 kg)	RS Jr	Australian Institute of Sport	Manly, Australia

Head coach

- Dan Majerle (Central Michigan)

Assistant coach(es)

- Todd Lee (Azusa Pacific)
- Chris Crevelone (Adams State)
- T. J. Benson (Grand Canyon)

Legend

- (C) Team captain
- (S) Suspended
- (I) Ineligible
- (W) Walk-on
- Injured
- Current redshirt

Roster

== Schedule and results ==
Date time, TV	Rank^{#}	Opponent^{#}	Result	Record	High points	High rebounds	High assists	Site (attendance) city, state
Exhibition
Oct 22, 2017*; 5:00 pm		at Nevada; Charity exhibition benefiting North Bay Fire Relief	L 72–81		15 – Frayer	7 – Blumbergs	3 – Martin	Lawlor Events Center (3,072); Reno, NV
Nov 2, 2017*; 7:00 pm, YurView/ESPN3		St. Francis (IL)	W 89–49		17 – Lever	8 – Smith	9 – Benson	GCU Arena (7,118); Phoenix, AZ
Regular season
Nov 10, 2017*; 7:00 pm, YurView/ESPN3		Florida A&M	W 67–51	1–0	11 – Aidoo/Braun	9 – Vernon	4 – Benson/Braun	GCU Arena (7,202); Phoenix, AZ
Nov 13, 2017*; 7:00 pm, YurView/ESPN3		Robert Morris; Grand Canyon Classic	W 75–61	2–0	20 – Braun	9 – Frayer	5 – Benson	GCU Arena (6,833); Phoenix, AZ
Nov 18, 2017*; 7:00 pm, YurView/ESPN3		Little Rock; Grand Canyon Classic	W 76–51	3–0	29 – Braun	6 – Frayer/Vernon	3 – 5 players tied	GCU Arena (7,394); Phoenix, AZ
Nov 20, 2017*; 7:00 pm, YurView/ESPN3		Norfolk State; Grand Canyon Classic	W 75–60	4–0	19 – Frayer	8 – Blumbergs/Vernon	8 – Benson	GCU Arena (6,889); Phoenix, AZ
Nov 25, 2017*; 7:00 pm, YurView/ESPN3		San Diego; Grand Canyon Classic	L 62–75	4–1	20 – Braun	10 – Benson	6 – Benson	GCU Arena (7,391); Phoenix, AZ
Dec 2, 2017*; 7:00 pm, YurView/ESPN3		UC Riverside	W 68–56	5–1	14 – Blumbergs	7 – Blumbergs/Braun/Vernon	7 – Benson	GCU Arena (6,844); Phoenix, AZ
Dec 5, 2017*; 9:30 pm, ESPNU		vs. St. John's; Valley of the Sun Showcase	L 60–68	5–2	18 – Benson	15 – Vernon	3 – Aidoo	Talking Stick Resort Arena (8,907); Phoenix, AZ
Dec 9, 2017*; 7:00 pm, YurView/ESPN3		Grambling State	W 87–53	6–2	19 – Vernon	6 – Martin/Vernon	8 – Benson	GCU Arena (6,829); Phoenix, AZ
Dec 11, 2017*; 7:00 pm, YurView/ESPN3		North Carolina Central	W 64–59	7–2	20 – Braun	7 – Braun	7 – Benson	GCU Arena (6,276); Phoenix, AZ
Dec 13, 2017*; 7:00 pm		at Boise State	L 80–85 ^{2OT}	7–3	16 – Benson	12 – Vernon	5 – Carr	Taco Bell Arena (4,628); Boise, ID
Dec 18, 2017*; 7:00 pm, YurView/ESPN3		Mississippi Valley State	W 71–38	8–3	16 – Braun	6 – Braun/Lever	6 – Benson	GCU Arena (6,464); Phoenix, AZ
Dec 21, 2017*; 7:00 pm, YurView/ESPN3		Longwood	W 86–56	9–3	14 – Aidoo	10 – Lever	5 – Benson/Carr	GCU Arena (7,006); Phoenix, AZ
Dec 23, 2017*; 11:00 am, ACCN Extra		at Louisville	L 56–74	9–4	14 – Frayer	9 – Vernon	7 – Benson	KFC Yum! Center (16,841); Louisville, KY
Dec 27, 2017*; 6:00 pm, YurView/ESPN3		vs. Morgan State; Las Vegas Showcase	W 100–74	10–4	18 – Braun	9 – Lever	6 – Carr	Orleans Arena (1,544); Paradise, NV
Dec 30, 2017*; 2:00 pm, BTN+		at Illinois	L 58–62	10–5	14 – Vernon	5 – Braun/Lever/Vernon	3 – Braun/Carr	State Farm Center (13762); Champaign, IL
Jan 6, 2018; 8:00 pm		at Seattle	W 73–57	11–5 (1–0)	18 – Frayer	7 – Frayer/Martin	3 – Carr/Vernon	KeyArena (2,156); Seattle, WA
Jan 11, 2018; 7:00 pm, YurView/ESPN3		New Mexico State	L 59–70	11–6 (1–1)	15 – Braun	12 – Vernon	2 – 5 players tied	GCU Arena (7,521); Phoenix, AZ
Jan 13, 2018; 7:00 pm, YurView/ESPN3		Texas–Rio Grande Valley	W 84–71	12–6 (2–1)	25 – Blumbergs	15 – Vernon	3 – Braun/Carr	GCU Arena (7,222); Phoenix, AZ
Jan 18, 2018; 6:00 pm		at Chicago State	W 86–58	13–6 (3–1)	28 – Lever	8 – Lever	6 – Benson	Jones Convocation Center (463); Chicago, IL
Jan 20, 2018; 6:00 pm		at UMKC	W 86–69	14–6 (4–1)	24 – Lever	10 – Lever	9 – Benson	Municipal Auditorium (1,440); Kansas City, MO
Jan 23, 2018*; 7:00 pm, YurView/ESPN3		William Jessup	W 96–80	15–6	25 – Lever	8 – Blumbergs/Vernon	10 – Benson	GCU Arena (6,952); Phoenix, AZ
Jan 27, 2018; 7:00 pm, ESPN3		at Utah Valley	L 56–68	15–7 (4–2)	22 – Lever	9 – Frayer	5 – Benson	UCCU Center (4,881); Orem, UT
Feb 1, 2018; 7:00 pm, YurView/ESPN3		UMKC	W 79–62	16–7 (5–2)	18 – Vernon	13 – Frayer	4 – Benson/Martin	GCU Arena (7,005); Phoenix, AZ
Feb 3, 2018; 7:00 pm, YurView/ESPN3		Chicago State	W 89–55	17–7 (6–2)	14 – Braun	8 – Vernon	6 – Benson	GCU Arena (7,244); Phoenix, AZ
Feb 8, 2018; 7:00 pm		at Texas–Rio Grande Valley	L 81–83	17–8 (6–3)	22 – Lever	10 – Benson	6 – Benson	UTRGV Fieldhouse (1,038); Edinburg, TX
Feb 10, 2018; 6:00 pm, ESPN3		at New Mexico State	L 70–74	17–9 (6–4)	23 – Frayer	10 – Frayer	3 – Benson/Blumbergs/Vernon	Pan American Center (12,989); Las Cruces, NM
Feb 17, 2018; 8:00 pm, ESPN3		at Cal State Bakersfield	L 58–71	17–10 (6–5)	11 – Frayer	6 – Lever	2 – Lever/Milstead	Icardo Center (3,002); Bakersfield, CA
Feb 22, 2018; 7:00 pm, YurView/ESPN3		Seattle	W 76–64	18–10 (7–5)	30 – Lever	10 – Lever	5 – Benson	GCU Arena (6,925); Phoenix, AZ
Feb 24, 2018; 7:00 pm, YurView/ESPN3		Utah Valley	W 60–59	19–10 (8–5)	16 – Frayer/Lever	8 – Jackson	5 – Jackson	GCU Arena (7,179); Phoenix, AZ
Mar 3, 2018; 7:00 pm, YurView/ESPN3		Cal State Bakersfield	W 81–62	20–10 (9–5)	23 – Lever	9 – Vernon	5 – Vernon	GCU Arena (7,372); Phoenix, AZ
WAC tournament
Mar 8, 2018; 1:00 pm, ESPN3	(3)	vs. (6) UMKC; Quarterfinals	W 77–74	21–10	29 – Lever	15 – Frayer	3 – Martin/Milstead	Orleans Arena (1,508); Paradise, NV
Mar 9, 2018; 7:00 pm, ESPN3	(3)	vs. (2) Utah Valley; Semifinals	W 75–60	22–10	15 – Tied	8 – Tied	5 – Frayer	Orleans Arena (2,739); Paradise, NV
Mar 10, 2018; 7:00 pm, ESPNU	(3)	vs. (1) New Mexico State; Championship game	L 58–72	22–11	20 – Lever	8 – Vernon	4 – Vernon	Orleans Arena (3,065); Paradise, NV
CBI
Mar 14, 2018*; 7:00 pm, YurView/ESPN3		Mercer; First round	L 73–78	22–12	20 – Vernon	8 – Benson	7 – Benson	GCU Arena (5,941); Phoenix, AZ
*Non-conference game. ^{#}Rankings from AP Poll. (#) Tournament seedings in parentheses. All times are in Mountain Time.
