= 2017–18 UMKC Kangaroos men's basketball team =

American college basketball season

2017–18 UMKC Kangaroos men's basketball
- Conference: Western Athletic Conference
- Record: 10–22 (5–9 WAC)
- Head coach: Kareem Richardson (5th season)
- Associate head coach: Angres Thorpe (5th season)
- Assistant coaches: Conner Hampton (2nd season); Josh Sash (1st season)
- Home arena: Municipal Auditorium, Swinney Recreation Center

2017–18 WAC men's basketball standings
| | Conf. | | | | Overall |
| Team | W | | L | PCT | W | | L | PCT |
|---|---|---|---|---|---|---|---|---|
| New Mexico State † | 12 | – | 2 | .857 | 28 | – | 6 | .824 |
| Utah Valley | 10 | – | 4 | .714 | 23 | – | 11 | .676 |
| Grand Canyon | 9 | – | 5 | .643 | 22 | – | 12 | .647 |
| Seattle | 8 | – | 6 | .571 | 20 | – | 14 | .588 |
| Texas–Rio Grande Valley | 6 | – | 8 | .429 | 15 | – | 18 | .455 |
| Cal State Bakersfield | 5 | – | 9 | .357 | 12 | – | 18 | .400 |
| UMKC | 5 | – | 9 | .357 | 10 | – | 22 | .313 |
| Chicago State | 1 | – | 13 | .071 | 3 | – | 29 | .094 |
† 2018 WAC tournament winner

The 2017–18 UMKC Kangaroos men's basketball team represented the University of Missouri–Kansas City during the 2017–18 NCAA Division I men's basketball season. The Kangaroos, led by fifth-year head coach Kareem Richardson, played most of their home games off-campus at Municipal Auditorium (with one game on-campus at Swinney Recreation Center) in Kansas City, Missouri as a member of the Western Athletic Conference (WAC).

The Kangaroos finished the season 10–22, 5–9 in WAC play to finish in a tie for sixth place. They were defeated by Grand Canyon University in the WAC tournament quarterfinal round.

== Previous season ==
The Kangaroos finished the 2016–17 season with a record of 18–17 overall, 10–6 in conference to finish in fourth place. They accepted an invitation to the College Basketball Invitational (CBI) where they were victorious over the University of Wisconsin–Green Bay in the first round but were defeated by the University of Wyoming in the quarterfinal round.

== Offseason ==
=== Departures ===
| Pos. | # | Name | Height | Weight | Year | Hometown | Notes |
|---|---|---|---|---|---|---|---|
| G/F | 25 | Broderick Newbill | 6'5" | 190 | RS Sr | Kansas City, MO | Graduated |
| G/F | 4 | LaVell Boyd | 6'0" | 175 | Sr | Chicago, IL | Graduated |
| G | 12 | Martez Harrison | 5'11" | 200 | Sr | Kansas City, MO | Graduated/undrafted (signed with Glasgow Rocks) |
| G/F | 1 | Dashawn King | 6'3" | 195 | Sr | Bronx, NY | Graduated |
| F | 3 | Kyle Steward | 6'7" | 195 | Sr | Detroit, MI | Graduated |
| C | 54 | Darnell Tillman | 6'8" | 265 | Sr | St. Louis, MO | Graduated |
| G | 11 | Grant Leach | 6'3" | 190 | So | Fishers, IN | IU East |
| G | 32 | Broderick Ross | 6'1" | 175 | So | St. Louis, MO | Lindenwood |
| F | 22 | Duane Clark | 6'8" | 245 | Fr | St. Louis, Mo | Central Missouri |
| G/F | 42 | Daniel Hailey | 6'5" | 200 | Fr | Stanberry, MO | Southwestern CC |

=== Incoming transfers ===
| Pos. | # | Name | Height | Weight | Year | Previous school | Hometown |
|---|---|---|---|---|---|---|---|
| F | 4 | Danny Dixon | 6'10" | 228 | Jr | George Mason | Grosse Pointe South, MI |
| F | 22 | Brandon Suggs | 6'8" | 215 | So | Bethune–Cookman | Winnebago, IL |

=== Incoming Recruits ===
College recruiting information
| Name | Hometown | School | Height | Weight | Commit date |
|---|---|---|---|---|---|
| Tony Jackson; SF | Montgomery, AL | North Hardin HS | 6 ft 5 in (1.96 m) | 205 lb (93 kg) | |
| Tony Jackson; SF | Recruit ratings: Scout: Rivals: 247Sports: (NR) | | | | |
| Brandon McKissic; PG | Ferguson, MO | St. Louis University HS | 6 ft 2 in (1.88 m) | 185 lb (84 kg) | Aug 10, 2016 |
| Brandon McKissic; PG | Recruit ratings: Scout: Rivals: 247Sports: (NR) | | | | |
| Marvin Nesbitt, Jr. SF | Chicago, IL | Butler College Preparatory HS | 6 ft 4 in (1.93 m) | 180 lb (82 kg) | |
| Marvin Nesbitt, Jr. SF | Recruit ratings: Scout: Rivals: 247Sports: (NR) | | | | |
| DeMarco Smith; PG | Kansas City, KS | Washington HS | 6 ft 1 in (1.85 m) | 165 lb (75 kg) | |
| DeMarco Smith; PG | Recruit ratings: Scout: Rivals: 247Sports: (NR) | | | | |
Overall recruit ranking:
Note: In many cases, Scout, Rivals, 247Sports, On3, and ESPN may conflict in their listings of height and weight.; In these cases, the average was taken. ESPN grades are on a 100-point scale.; Sources: "2017 Team Ranking". Rivals.

== Roster ==
2017–18 UMKC Kangaroos men's basketball team
Players
Coaches

| Pos. | # | Name | Height | Weight | Year | Previous school | Hometown |
|---|---|---|---|---|---|---|---|
| G | 15 | Robert Knar | 6 ft 1 in (1.85 m) | 185 lb (84 kg) | RS Sr | Northern Iowa; Mundelein HS | Mundelein, IL |
| G | 10 | Broderick Robinson | 6 ft 1 in (1.85 m) | 195 lb (88 kg) | Sr | Northwest Kansas Technical; Grand Junction HS | Grand Junction, CO |
| C | 14 | Mo Ahmed | 7 ft 2 in (2.18 m) | 235 lb (107 kg) | Jr | Northern Oklahoma CC; Bishop Kelley HS | Tulsa, OK |
| F | 4 | Danny Dixon (redshirt) | 6 ft 10 in (2.08 m) | 230 lb (104 kg) | Jr | George Mason; Grosse Pointe South HS | Grosse Pointe Park, MI |
| F/C | 30 | Aleer Leek | 6 ft 9 in (2.06 m) | 225 lb (102 kg) | Jr | Victory Rock Prep/ IMG Academy | Juba, South Sudan |
| G | 0 | Xavier Bishop | 5 ft 8 in (1.73 m) | 150 lb (68 kg) | So | Lanphier HS | Springfield, IL |
| F | 5 | Jordan Giles | 6 ft 7 in (2.01 m) | 225 lb (102 kg) | So | Tennessee Christian Preparatory/ Holy Spirit Catholic | Tuscaloosa, AL |
| G | 2 | Isaiah Ross | 6 ft 4 in (1.93 m) | 195 lb (88 kg) | So | Hillcrest/ Davenport West HS | Davenport, IA |
| F | 22 | Brandon Suggs (redshirt) | 6 ft 8 in (2.03 m) | 220 lb (100 kg) | So | Bethune–Cookman; Winnebago HS | Rockford, IL |
| G | 25 | Steve Dulley (W) | 6 ft 3 in (1.91 m) | 200 lb (91 kg) | Fr | Lincoln College Preparatory | Kansas City, MO |
| G/F | 11 | Tony Jackson | 6 ft 5 in (1.96 m) | 205 lb (93 kg) | Fr | North Hardin HS | Montgomery, AL |
| G | 3 | Brandon McKissic | 6 ft 3 in (1.91 m) | 195 lb (88 kg) | Fr | St. Louis University HS | Ferguson, MO |
| G | 33 | Marvin Nesbitt, Jr. | 6 ft 4 in (1.93 m) | 180 lb (82 kg) | Fr | Butler College Preparatory HS | Chicago, IL |
| G | 12 | Kaleb Roy (W) (redshirt) | 6 ft 3 in (1.91 m) | 180 lb (82 kg) | Fr | Shaker Heights HS | Shaker Heights, OH |
| G/F | 1 | Marco Smith | 6 ft 2 in (1.88 m) | 165 lb (75 kg) | Fr | Washington HS | Kansas City, KS |

Head coach

- Kareem Richardson (Evansville)

Assistant coach(es)

- Angres Thorpe (Saint Leo)
- Conner Hampton (Tabor)
- Josh Sash (William Penn)

Legend

- (C) Team captain
- (S) Suspended
- (I) Ineligible
- (W) Walk-on
- (5Y) Fifth-year Senior
- Injured
- Current redshirt

Roster
Last update: November 3, 2024

== Schedule & Results ==
| Date time, TV | Rank^{#} | Opponent^{#} | Result | Record | High points | High rebounds | High assists | Site (attendance) city, state |
Exhibition Season
| November 3, 2017*; 6:00 PM | | Sterling (Kansas) | W 110–58 | | 16 – Bishop, Smith | 8 – Nesbitt, Jr. | 4 – Robinson | Municipal Auditorium; Kansas City, MO |
Regular Season
| November 10, 2017*; 7:00 PM, Cox HD 2022 | | at No. 7 Wichita State | L 57–109 | 0–1 | 12 – Ross | 5 – Robinson | 3 – Bishop | Charles Koch Arena (10,506); Wichita, KS |
| November 12, 2017*; 4:00 PM, KSMO–TV | | Haskell Indian Nations; Gulf Coast Showcase [Campus Game] | W 110–59 | 1–1 | 21 – Giles | 7 – Robinson | 6 – Nesbitt, Jr. | Municipal Auditorium (1,004); Kansas City, MO |
| November 10, 2017*; 7:00 PM, FSKC | | at Kansas State | L 51–72 | 1–2 | 12 – Ross | 5 – Nesbitt, Jr. | 4 – Bishop | Fred Bramlage Coliseum (7,373); Manhattan, KS |
| November 16, 2017*; 7:00 PM, KSMO–TV | | Loyola Chicago | L 56–66 | 1–3 | 16 – Robinson | 7 – Robinson | 3 – McKissic | Municipal Auditorium (1,482); Kansas City, MO |
| November 20, 2017*; 10:00 AM, FloHoops | | vs. Manhattan; Gulf Coast Showcase [Quarterfinal] | W 74–63 | 2–3 | 26 – Robinson | 5 – Robinson, Nesbitt, Jr. | 5 – Robinson | Germain Arena (823); Estero, FL |
| November 21, 2017*; 4:00 PM, FloHoops | | vs. Georgia Southern; Gulf Coast Showcase [Semifinal] | L 75–78 | 2–4 | 16 – Ross | 6 – Leek | 4 – Robinson | Germain Arena; Estero, FL |
| November 22, 2017*; 4:00 PM, FloHoops | | vs. Penn; Gulf Coast Showcase [Third Place] | L 65–68 | 2–5 | 18 – Robinson | 6 – Robinson, Bishop, Nesbitt, Jr. | 5 – Nesbitt, Jr. | Germain Arena; Estero, FL |
| November 26, 2017*; 4:00 PM, OVC DN | | at UT Martin | W 65–55 | 3–5 | 27 – Ross | 5 – Leek, Bishop | 6 – Bishop | Skyhawk Arena (1,338); Martin, TN |
| November 30, 2017*; 7:00 PM, KMCI–TV | | South Dakota | L 63–82 | 3–6 | 16 – Bishop | 6 – Leek | 2 – Bishop, Ross | Swinney Recreation Center (1,257); Kansas City, MO |
| December 6, 2017*; 6:30 PM, KSMO–TV | | at Southeast Missouri State | L 87–91 | 3–7 | 24 – Robinson | 10 – Robinson | 5 – Bishop | Show Me Center (1,586); Cape Girardeau, MO |
| December 9, 2017*; 1:00 PM, ACCN Extra | | at North Carolina State | L 69–88 | 3–8 | 15 – Leek | 5 – Ross, Nesbitt, Jr. | 2 – Leek, Bishop, Giles, Nesbitt, Jr. | PNC Arena (5,500); Raleigh, NC |
| December 16, 2017*; 3:00 PM | | at Incarnate Word | L 73–77 | 3–9 | 25 – Bishop | 8 – Bishop | 3 – Bishop, Smith | Alice P. McDermott; Convocation Center (988); San Antonio, TX |
| December 19, 2017*; 7:00 PM, KMCI–TV | | Central Michigan | L 86–92 ^{OT} | 3–10 | 23 – Bishop | 7 – Ross | 6 – McKissic | Municipal Auditorium (1,158); Kansas City, MO |
| December 22, 2017*; 6:00 PM, KMCI–TV | | South Dakota State | L 60–85 | 3–11 | 15 – Bishop | 8 – Robinson | 2 – Knar, Bishop, Dulley | Municipal Auditorium (1,203); Kansas City, MO |
| December 28, 2017*; 7:00 PM, KSMO–TV | | Avila | W 89–58 | 4–11 | 20 – Ross | 6 – Ross | 7 – Bishop | Municipal Auditorium (1,145); Kansas City, MO |
| January 2, 2018*; 6:00 PM, ESPN3 | | at USC Upstate | W 79–77 | 5–11 | 21 – Ross | 6 – Robinson, Giles | 6 – Bishop | G. B. Hodge Center (837); Spartanburg, SC |
| January 6, 2018; 7:00 PM, KSMO–TV | | UT Rio Grande Valley | L 61–73 | 5–12 (0–1) | 20 – Robinson | 6 – Leek | 3 – Giles | Municipal Auditorium (955); Kansas City, MO |
| January 11, 2018; 8:00 PM, KSMO–TV | | at Utah Valley | L 59–95 | 5–13 (0–2) | 12 – McKissic | 5 – McKissic | 5 – McKissic | UCCU Center (2,733); Orem, UT |
| January 13, 2018; 3:00 PM, WAC DN | | at Seattle | L 75–77 | 5–14 (0–3) | 21 – Giles | 5 – Giles | 5 – Bishop | KeyArena (1,449); Seattle, WA |
| January 18, 2018; 7:00 PM, KMCI–TV | | CSU Bakersfield | W 62–59 | 6–14 (1–3) | 16 – McKissic | 5 – Leek | 7 – Bishop | Municipal Auditorium (1,003); Kansas City, MO |
| January 20, 2018; 7:00 PM, KSMO–TV | | Grand Canyon | L 69–86 | 6–15 (1–4) | 23 – Bishop | 5 – Robinson | 2 – Robinson, Jackson, McKissic | Municipal Auditorium (1,440); Kansas City, MO |
| January 23, 2018*; 6:00 PM, KSMO–TV | | William Jewell | L 74–86 | 6–16 | 14 – Robinson | 7 – Robinson | 4 – Bishop | Municipal Auditorium (1,057); Kansas City, MO |
| January 27, 2018; 7:00 PM, KMCI–TV | | New Mexico State | L 48–73 | 6–17 (1–5) | 12 – Bishop | 10 – Leek | 2 – Robinson, Bishop | Municipal Auditorium (1,410); Kansas City, MO |
| February 1, 2018; 8:00 PM, KSMO–TV | | at Grand Canyon | L 62–79 | 6–18 (1–6) | 16 – Robinson | 5 – Robinson, McKissic | 4 – Robinson | GCU Arena (7,005); Phoenix, AZ |
| February 3, 2018; 9:00 PM, WAC DN | | at CSU Bakersfield | L 58–81 | 6–19 (1–7) | 17 – Bishop | 5 – Robinson, Ross | 5 – Bishop | Jimmie and Marjorie; Icardo Center (3,209); Bakersfield, CA |
| February 8, 2018; 7:00 PM, KMCI–TV | | Seattle | W 74–67 | 7–19 (2–7) | 18 – Bishop, Giles | 10 – Giles | 2 – Robinson, Bishop, Giles, McKissic | Municipal Auditorium (1,155); Kansas City, MO |
| February 10, 2018; 7:00 PM, KSMO–TV | | Utah Valley | W 77–70 | 8–19 (3–7) | 23 – Giles | 11 – Robinson | 3 – Robinson, Bishop, McKissic | Municipal Auditorium (1,357); Kansas City, MO |
| February 15, 2018; 7:00 PM, WAC DN | | Chicago State | W 76–67 | 9–19 (4–7) | 17 – Giles, McKissic | 9 – Robinson | 4 – Bishop | Municipal Auditorium (1,325); Kansas City, MO |
| February 22, 2018; 7:00 PM, WAC DN | | at UT Rio Grande Valley | W 83–59 | 10–19 (5–7) | 18 – Robinson | 9 – Robinson | 5 – Bishop | UTRGV Fieldhouse (1,163); Bakersfield, CA |
| February 24, 2018; 8:00 PM | | at New Mexico State | L 58–82 | 10–20 (5–8) | 9 – McKissic, Smith | 7 – Robinson | 3 – McKissic | Pan American Center (5,989); Las Cruces, NM |
| March 3, 2018; 4:30 PM, WAC DN | | at Chicago State | L 82–96 | 10–21 (5–9) | 24 – Ross | 9 – Ross | 5 – Bishop | Emil and Patricia; Jones Convocation Center (553); Chicago, IL |
Conference Tournament
| March 8, 2018*; 2:00 PM, ESPN3 | (6) | vs. (3) Grand Canyon [Quarterfinal] | L 74–77 | 10–22 | 17 – McKissic | 7 – Robinson | 3 – Bishop | Orleans Arena (1,508); Paradise, NV |
*Non-conference game. ^{#}Rankings from AP Poll. (#) Tournament seedings in parentheses. All times are in Central Standard Time (CST).
