= 2025 Birthday Honours =

Appointments made by King Charles III

The 2025 King's Birthday and Operational Honours are appointments by some of the 15 Commonwealth realms of King Charles III to various orders and honours to reward and highlight good works by citizens of those countries. The Birthday Honours are awarded as part of the King's Official Birthday celebrations during the month of June. The honours list for the United Kingdom was announced on 14 June 2025. The 2025 Operational Honours (June) were awarded embedded with the Birthday Honours list.

The King appoints members to the orders upon the advice of his ministers. However, the Order of the Garter, the Order of the Thistle, the Order of Merit and the Royal Victorian Order are bestowed solely by the sovereign.

In the 2025 Birthday Honours, former rugby league player Billy Boston received a knighthood for his services, becoming the first rugby league personality to have that honour. His knighthood was made public earlier than the official announcement due to concerns regarding Boston's health. The knighthood came one week after media criticism regarding the fact that no one from the sport had ever been knighted, with analysts stating that this is an illustration of how people from working class backgrounds are overlooked in the honours lists. In the previous honours list, the BBC reported that 4% of recipients were from a working class upbringing.

== United Kingdom ==
Below are the individuals appointed by Charles III in his right as King of the United Kingdom with honours within his own gift, and with the advice of the Government for other honours.

=== Order of the Companions of Honour ===
Order of the Companions of Honour ribbon

==== Member of the Order of Companions of Honour (CH) ====
- Professor Dame Susan Jocelyn Bell Burnell, DBE, FRS, FRSE. Visiting Professor, University of Oxford. For services to Astronomy and Physics and to Diversity.
- Sir Antony Mark David Gormley, OBE. Sculptor. For services to Art.

=== Knight Bachelor ===
Knight Bachelor ribbon

- Alexander Charles Beard, CBE. Chief Executive, Royal Ballet and Opera. For services to the Arts.
- David Robert Joseph Beckham, OBE. For services to Sport and to Charity.
- William John Boston, MBE. For services to Rugby League Football. (To be dated 10 June 2025)
- Andrew George Christie CBE. Lately Children’s Commissioner, North Northamptonshire Council and West Northamptonshire Council, and lately Chair, Birmingham Children's Trust. For services to Children's Services.
- Roger Harry Daltrey CBE. Patron, Teenage Cancer Trust. For services to Charity and to Music.
- Professor Vernon Charles Gibson, CB, FRS. Visiting Professor, Department of Materials, Imperial College London. For services to Science and to Defence.
- Peter Rene Lauener, CB. Lately Chief Executive, Education and Skills Funding Agency, and lately Board Member, Department for Education. For services to Education.
- Rufus John Norris. Director and Chief Executive Officer, The National Theatre. For services to Theatre.
- Gary Leonard Oldman. Actor. For services to Drama.
- Hans Kristian Anders Ruben Rausing. Philanthropist. For services to the Arts.
- Thomas Gordon Roddick. Founder, The Roddick Foundation. For services to Charity and Philanthropy.
- The Right Honourable Mark Richard Tami, MP. Member of Parliament for Alyn and Deeside and Government Deputy Chief Whip. For Political and Public Service.
- Paul Terence Tarn. Chief Executive Officer, Delta Academies Trust, West Yorkshire. For services to Education.
- Stephen Watson, QPM. Chief Constable, Greater Manchester Police. For services to Policing

=== Most Honourable Order of the Bath ===
Order of the Bath ribbon

==== Knight/Dame Commander of the Order of the Bath (KCB / DCB) ====
Military

- Air Marshal John Jackson Stringer, CBE, Royal Air Force, 5206233K.

Civil

- Madeleine Kay Alessandri, CMG. Chair, Joint Intelligence Committee. For Public Service.
- Sarah Elizabeth Healey, CB, CVO. Permanent Secretary, Ministry of Housing, Communities and Local Government. For Public Service.

==== Companion of the Order of the Bath (CB) ====
Military

- Rear Admiral Steven McCarthy, Royal Navy, C036106N.
- Rear Admiral Robert George Pedre, Royal Navy, C038334J.
- Major General Zachary Raymond Stenning, OBE, 538652.
- Air Vice-Marshal Mark William James Chapell, Royal Air Force, 8304193C.
- Air Vice-Marshal Alastair Peter Thomas Smith, Royal Air Force,2636507P.

Civil

- Richard Chettleburgh. Director, Ministry of Defence. For services to Defence.
- Philip Douglas. Director General, Border Force, Home Office. For services to Border Security and Public Service.
- Katie Ruth Farrington. Lately Director General for Social Security Disability and Pensions, Department for Work and Pensions. For Public Service.
- Alison Mary Giles. Director of Security for Parliament, Houses of Parliament. For Parliamentary and Public Service.
- Jerome Alexander Pierre Glass. Director General, Courts and Access to Justice, International Justice and Legal, Ministry of Justice. For Public Service.
- Sarah Harrison, MBE. Chief Operating Officer, Cabinet Office. For services to Government Productivity and Regulatory Excellence.
- Peter William May. Lately Permanent Secretary, Department of Health, Northern Ireland Civil Service. For Public Service.
- Matthew Thurstan. Chief Finance Officer and Director General, Ministry of Housing, Communities and Local Government. For Public Service.

=== Most Distinguished Order of St Michael and St George ===
Order of St Michael and St George ribbon

==== Knight Grand Cross of the Order of St Michael and St George (GCMG) ====
- Sir Philip Robert Barton, KCMG, OBE – Former Permanent Under-Secretary, Foreign, Commonwealth and Development Office. For services to British Foreign Policy.

==== Knight Commander of the Order of St Michael and St George (KCMG) ====
- Stephen James Kavanagh, QPM, DL. Lately INTERPOL Executive Director of Police Services. For services to International Policing and Public Safety.

==== Companion of the Order of St Michael and St George (CMG) ====
- Christopher Anderson. Head, TED Conferences. For services to Entrepreneurship, Education and Global Understanding.
- Mark Bassett. Lately Special Assistant to the Director General of the International Atomic Energy Agency, Vienna. For services to Global Nuclear Safety and Security.
- Professor Frances Gardner. Professor of Child and Family Psychology. For services to reducing Violence against Children.
- Professor Edith Heard, FRS. Director General, the European Molecular Biology Laboratory. For services to Science and to UK/France relations.
- James Kariuki. UK Deputy Permanent Representative to the United Nations, New York. For services to British Foreign Policy and National Security.
- Professor David Lalloo. Vice Chancellor, Liverpool School of Tropical Medicine. For services to Global Health and International Development, and leadership in Higher Education.
- Andrew Murdoch. Governor of Bermuda and lately Legal Director, Foreign, Commonwealth and Development Office. For services to British Foreign Policy.
- Christopher Rampling, MBE. Lately Director, National Security, Foreign, Commonwealth and Development Office. For services to British Foreign Policy and National Security.
- Corin Robertson. Director General, Finance and Corporate, Foreign, Commonwealth and Development Office. For services to British Foreign Policy.
- Katherine Rowe. Director General, Foreign, Commonwealth and Development Office. For services to British Foreign Policy and National Security.
- Dr Paul Smith. Secretary General, Botanic Gardens Conservation International. For services to International Plant Conservation.
- Beverley Tew. Lead Non-Executive Director, Foreign, Commonwealth and Development Office; Trustee and Chair of the Audit Committee of Plan International UK. For services to International Development, Commerce and Charity.
- Charles Walker, MBE. Director International Operations, British Council. For services to UK Cultural relations.

=== Royal Victorian Order ===
Royal Victorian Order ribbon

==== Knight/Dame Commander of the Royal Victorian Order (KCVO / DCVO) ====
- Robert William Lowry Scott, OBE. Lord-Lieutenant of County Tyrone.
- Susan Snowdon. Lord-Lieutenant of County Durham.

==== Commander of the Royal Victorian Order (CVO) ====
- Mark Francis Whitlock Blundell. Lord-Lieutenant of Merseyside.
- Timothy Aidan John Knox. Director, Royal Collection.
- The Lady Clare Amabel Margaret, Countess of Euston. Lord-Lieutenant of Suffolk.
- Commander Anne Gillian Sullivan, LVO, RN. Deputy Private Secretary to The Princess Royal, Royal Household.
- The Reverend Andrew David Gibson Wright. Lately Secretary General, The Mission to Seafarers.

==== Lieutenant of the Royal Victorian Order (LVO) ====
- Dr Nicholas Hugh Brown. Apothecary to The Queen.
- Major Marco Ciotti. Secretary and ADC to the Lieutenant-Governor of the Bailiwick of Guernsey.
- Ranan Dasgupta. Sergeant-Surgeon to the Royal Medical Household.
- Lee Dobson, MVO, RVM. Head Valet to The King, The Royal Household.
- The Reverend Canon Roger John Hall MBE. Deputy Priest in Ordinary and Chaplain, His Majesty's Royal Palace and Fortress, the Tower of London.
- Bronwyn Kay Jolly. Aide to the Governor of South Australia.
- Robert John Baptist Noel. Clarenceux King of Arms, College of Arms.
- David Donald Owen. Lately Official Secretary to the Governor of Tasmania.
- Adrian Douglas Phillips. Director of Palaces and Collections, Historic Royal Palaces.
- Dominic Charles David Richards, OAM. Chairman, The King's Foundation Australia.
- Dr Timothy David Wakeford. Apothecary to the Royal Medical Household, Highgrove House.

==== Member of the Royal Victorian Order (MVO) ====
- Tjeerd Bakker. Senior Horological Conservator, Royal Collection.
- Jessica Kate Ball. Senior People Partner and HR Operations Lead, Royal Household.
- Jacqueline Betts. Accounts Ledger Administrator, Royal Household.
- Christopher John Conrad. Chief Inspector, Metropolitan Police Service. For services to Royalty and Specialist Protection.
- Terence David Cotter. Head, Financial Administration, Duchy of Cornwall.
- Rachel Elizabeth Eaton. Retail Manager, Royal Collection, Windsor.
- Robin Michael George Fuller. Chief Yeoman Warder, His Majesty's Royal Palace and Fortress, the Tower of London.
- Robert Anthony Galloway. Sergeant, Metropolitan Police Service. For services to Royalty and Specialist Protection.
- Major Antony Michael Peter Harris. Assistant to the Crown Equerry, Royal Household.
- Richard John Jackson. Sergeant, Metropolitan Police Service. For services to Royalty and Specialist Protection.
- Stuart Major. Executive Head Chief, Private Royal Residences, Royal Household.
- Duncan Charles Mousseau. Director, Knowledge and Protocol, Office of the Governor-General of Canada.
- Heather Jane Pickering. IT Project Manager, Royal Household.
- Lauren Porter. Senior Curator of Works on Paper, Royal Collection.
- Charlotte Mary Reece. Engagement and Operations Manager, Buckingham Palace Reservicing Programme.
- Victoria Claire Rutter. Correspondence Officer, Private Secretary's Office, Royal Household.
- William Stockting. Archives Manager, Royal Collection, Windsor.
- Jodie Elizabeth Sutton. Senior People Partner, Human Resources, Royal Household.
- Robert Joseph Szewczyk. Head Chef, Cumberland Lodge.
- Karl Michael Tinkler. Assistant Nursery Manager, Royal Gardens Nursery, Windsor.
- Sean Allen Whinray. Senior Support Officer, Staffordshire Lieutenancy.
- Thomas William Gwynn Wilson. Secretary, Association of Lord-Lieutenants.

=== Royal Victorian Medal (RVM) ===
Royal Victorian Medal ribbon

Gold

- David John Oates, MVO, RVM. State Harness Cleaner, Royal Mews, Buckingham Palace.
- David Russell Quick, MVO, RVM. House Manager, Bagshot Park.

Silver – Bar

- David Richard Seymour, RVM. Landscape Operative, Valley Gardens, Windsor Great Park.

Silver

- Nivek Amichund. Chief Exhibitor, Historic Royal Palaces.
- Pilar Isabel Aran Molina. Assistant Visitor Services Manager, Royal Collection, Palace of Holyroodhouse.
- Stephen William Canning. Lately Senior Patrol Officer, Government House, Queensland.
- Evahn Joel Derkley. IT Manager, Government House, Canberra.
- Gavin Sean Doel. Horticulturalist, Crown Estate, Windsor.
- The Reverend Kayode John Gbadeyan. General Catering Assistant, Royal Household.
- Peter Harris. Groom, Hampton Court Palace Stables.
- Justin John Kemp. Liveried Helper, Royal Mews, Buckingham Palace.
- Richard Charles Marshall. Tractor and Machinery Operator, Crown Estate, Windsor.
- Lisa Ann Mills. Under-Butler, Government House, Adelaide.
- Kim Searle. Community Manager and People Adviser, Crown Estate, Windsor.
- Christopher James Walker. Deer Stalker, Balmoral Estate.
- Linda Anne Wroth. Warehouse Administrator, Royal Collection, Windsor Castle.

=== Most Excellent Order of the British Empire ===
Civil division ribbon

Military division ribbon

==== Knight/Dame Grand Cross of the Order of the British Empire (GBE) ====
Civil

- Professor Sir Simon Charles Wessely, FMedSci, FRS. Regius Professor of Psychiatry, King's College London. For services to Mental Health.

==== Knight/Dame Commander of the Order of the British Empire (KBE / DBE) ====
Military

- Lieutenant General Charles Seymour Collins, DSO, OBE

Civil

- Clare Louise Barclay. Lately Chief Executive Officer, Microsoft UK. For services to Business, Technology and Leadership.
- Patricia Margaret Barker, CBE. Author. For services to Literature.
- Professor Julia Mary Black, CBE, FBA. President, The British Academy. For services to Research in the Arts, Humanities and Social Sciences.
- Emma Mary Bridgewater, CBE. Founder, Emma Bridgewater Pottery. For services to Ceramics.
- Caroline Clarke. London Regional Director, NHS England. For services to the NHS.
- Deborah Anne Crosbie. Chief Executive Officer, Nationwide Building Society. For services to the Financial Sector.
- Anne Margaret Glover, CBE, HonFREng, FRSE. Chief Executive Officer and Co-Founder, Amadeus Capital Partners. For services to Engineering and Science Business.
- Annie Hudson. Chair, Child Safeguarding Practice Review Panel, England. For services to Child Safeguarding and Child Protection.
- Celia Louise Ingham Clark, MBE. Lately Medical Director for Professional Leadership and Professional Standards, NHS England. For services to the NHS.
- Professor Jane Frances Lovely (Jane Cummings) CBE. Chair, Royal College of Nursing Foundation. For voluntary services to Nursing and to Health and Social Care.
- Professor Ursula Hilda Mary Martin, CBE, FREng, FRSE. Emeritus Professor in the Mathematical Institute, University of Oxford. For services to Science and Education.
- The Rt. Hon. Penelope Mary Mordaunt. Lately Lord President of the Privy Council, Leader of the House of Commons and Member of Parliament for Portsmouth North. For Political and Public Service.
- The Rt. Hon. Chi Onwurah, MP. Member of Parliament for Newcastle Upon Tyne Central and West, and Chair of the Science, Innovation and Technology Select Committee. For Political and Public Service.
- Elaine Paige, OBE. Singer and Actress. For services to Music and to Charity.
- Lesley Anne Powell, CBE. Chief Executive Officer, North East Learning Trust. For services to Education.
- Dr. Anna Lisbet Kristina Rausing. Philanthropist and Co-Founder, Arcadia. For services to the Art.

==== Commander of the Order of the British Empire (CBE) ====
Military

- Commodore Paul Edward Dunn, OBE
- Commodore Philip Gordon Game
- Commodore Timothy Cooper Green, ADC
- Colonel Nicholas Owen Fitzgerald, MBE, Army Reserve
- Colonel Iain Edward Gibb, KHS
- Colonel Graham John Sefton
- Brigadier Alexander James Smith
- Group Captain Andrew Butron
- Air Commodore Ian James Sharrocks, OBE

Civil

- The Hon. Joseph Cyril Edward Bamford. HydraB Power Group. For services to Innovating and Developing the Clean Hydrogen Economy.
- James Barton. Executive Director, HMPPS Change, HM Prison and Probation Service. For Public Service.
- Joanna Cynthia Berry. Founder, Building Bridges for Peace. For services to Peace and Reconciliation.
- James Leigh Stuart Best. Chair, Credos and Chair, Committees of Advertising Practice. For services to the Advertising Industry.
- Thomas Paul Richard Bloxham MBE. Chair, Manchester International Festival and Factory International. For services to Culture.
- David John Bolt. Independent Chief Inspector of Borders and Immigration. For Public Service.
- Professor Owen Bowden-Jones. Clinical Psychiatrist and Chair, Advisory Council on the Misuse of Drugs. For services to Addiction Rehabilitation and Public Service.
- Susan Amanda Brookes. Interim Director of Strategy and Stakeholder Engagement, The Scottish Prison Service. For services to People in Custody.
- Rosalie Brown. Co-Chief Executive Officer of COOK. For services to Former Prisoner Employment.
- Paul Caldwell. Chief Executive Officer, Rural Payments Agency. For services to Agriculture and to Rural Areas.
- Maria Caulfield. Lately Minister of State for Health and Member of Parliament for Lewes. For Political and Public Service.
- Susan Valerie Clews. Lately Chief Executive, Acas. For services to Employment Relations.
- Professor Timothy James Cole FMedSci. Professor Emeritus of Population, Health and Practice, Great Ormond Street Institute of Child Health, University College London. For services to Medical Statistics.
- Philip Albert Colligan. Chief Executive Officer, Raspberry Pi Foundation. For services to Engineering and Technology for Societal Impact.
- Caroline Jane Cotterell. Lately Director, Resilient Landscape and Seas, Natural England. For services to the Natural Environment.
- Jason Victor Coward. National Chair, Royal British Legion. For services to Veterans.
- Michael Francis Cox. Treasurer, Liberal Democrats. For Political and Public Service.
- Peter Michael Cox. Professor of Climate System Dynamics in Mathematics, University of Exeter. For services to Science and to Climate Modelling.
- Roisin Helen Currie. Chief Executive Officer, Greggs PLC. For services to Hospitality.
- Peter William Dawson. Lately Director, Prison Reform Trust. For services to Prisoners and to Prison Reform.
- Damon Patrick de Laszlo DL. For services to the Manufacturing Industry and to Scientific and Charitable Causes.
- Peter-Robert Denton. Lately Chief Executive, Homes England. For services to Housing and to Major Urban Regeneration.
- Professor Gordon Dougan FRS FMedSci. GSK Professor of Microbial Pathogenesis, University of Cambridge. For services to Vaccines and to Global Health.
- Ian Christopher Dyson QPM DL. Lately Commissioner, City of London Police. For Voluntary and Charitable Services and to Policing.
- Lawrence Brian Elliott. Lately Economics Editor, The Guardian. For services to Economics Journalism.
- Professor Ruth Endacott. Director of Nursing and Midwifery, National Institute for Health and Care Research. For services to Nursing Research and Critical Care Education and Practice.
- Professor Julie Lydia Fitzpatrick OBE FRSE. Chief Scientific Adviser, Scottish Government. For services to Science.
- Stephen Edward Foots. Chief Executive Officer, Croda. For services to the Chemical and Life Sciences Industries.
- Mark Foy. Chief Executive and Chief Nuclear Inspector, Office for Nuclear Regulation. For services to the Safety and Security Regulation of the Nuclear Industry.
- Prem Babu Goyal OBE. Alderman, City of London Corporation. For Public Service.
- Professor Sarah Greer. Vice-Chancellor, University of Winchester. For services to Higher Education.
- Jane Elizabeth Harbottle. Chief Executive Officer, Legal Aid Agency. For Public Service.
- Julian Vaughan Harrap. Founder, Julian Harrap Architects. For services to Architecture.
- Shevaun Haviland. Director General, British Chambers of Commerce. For services to Business.
- Professor Gabriele Clarissa Hegerl FRS FRSE. Professor of Climate System Science, University of Edinburgh. For services to Climate Science.
- Alison Hilton. Lately Universal Credit Area Director, North East, Department for Work and Pensions. For Public Service.
- Jonathan Mark Holmes. Lately Co-Chair, Infrastructure Exports UK and Deputy Chairman, Mace. For services to Construction.
- David Philip Howden. Founder and Chief Executive Officer, Howden Group. For services to the Insurance Industry.
- Janet Hughes. Director, Farming and Countryside Programme, Department for Environment, Farming and Rural Affairs. For Public Service.
- Nicolas Anthony Hulme. Chief Executive, East Suffolk and North Essex NHS Foundation Trust. For services to the NHS.
- Dr. Sara Jane Hurley. Lately Chief Dental Officer for England, NHS England. For services to Dentistry.
- Alice Michelle Hurrell. Chief People Officer, Department of Energy Security and Net Zero. For Public Service.
- Peter Jonathan Hyman. Lately Senior Advisor to Sir Keir Starmer, Educationalist and CoFounder, School 21 and Voice 21, and Founder, School 360. For services to Politics and to Education.
- Professor Meriel Evelyn Mary Jenney. Paediatric Oncologist, Cardiff and Vale University Health Board. For services to Cancer Treatment and to Research in Children and Young People.
- Gavin Lindsay Jones. Lately Chief Executive, Essex County Council. For services to Local Government.
- Professor Rowland Raymond Kao. Professor of Veterinary Epidemiology and Data Science, University of Edinburgh. For services to Mathematics and Infectious Disease Dynamics.
- Martha Catherine Kearney. Journalist and Broadcaster. For services to Journalism and Broadcasting.
- Michelle Sylvia King (Michelle Scrimgeour). Lately Chief Executive Officer, Legal and General Investment Management. For services to the Asset Management Industry.
- Jane Elizabeth Marie Lapotaire. Actress. For services to Drama.
- Tiina Le-Seong Lee. Chief Executive Officer, Citi UK. For services to the Financial Services Sector.
- The Hon. Arabella Lennox-Boyd. Landscape Designer. For services to Horticulture and to Charity.
- Paul Nigel Livingston. Chief Executive, Lockheed Martin UK. For services to the Defence Industry.
- Professor Jane Longmore DL. Lately Vice-Chancellor, University of Chichester. For services to Higher Education.
- Professor Ewan Beaton Macdonald OBE. Professor and Head, Healthy Working Lives Group, University of Glasgow. For services to Occupational Medicine and to Reducing Health Inequalities.
- Nicholas John Massey. Chief Executive Officer, Forever Manchester. For services to the community in Greater Manchester.
- Paulette Maria Mastin. Solicitor and Chair, The Black Solicitors ' Network. For services to Diversity in Legal Services.
- Peter Mayhew-Smith. Group Principal and Chief Executive Officer, South Thames Colleges Group. For services to Further Education.
- Professor Mariana Mazzucato. Professor in Economics of Innovation and Public Value, University College London. For services to Economics.
- Charles Mindehall. Co-Founder, Blenheim Chalcot and Chair, OnSide Youth Zones and Babyzone. For services to Business, Philanthropy and to Young People.
- Dr. Peter James Musgrove. Engineer and Renewable Energy Pioneer. For services to Renewable Energy.
- Alison Agnes Isabel, Lady Myners. Lately Chair, Royal Academy. For services to the Arts.
- Babatunde Olanrewaju. Managing Partner, Europe, McKinsey & Company. For services to Business.
- Professor Idayat Bolanle Owolabi. Director for Health Inequalities, NHS England and General Practitioner, Creswell and Langwith Centres. For services to Reducing Health Inequalities.
- Catherine Sian Paine. Chief Executive, REAch2 Academy Trust. For services to Education.
- Eric Owen Parry. Founder, Eric Parry Architects. For services to Architecture.
- Douglas John David Perkins. Co-Founder and Chair, Specsavers. For services to Business and Trade.
- Frederick Khandekar Perry. Lately Director, Advanced Manufacturing, Department for Business and Trade. For services to Business and Trade.
- Professor William Powrie FREng. Professor of Geotechnical Engineering, University of Southampton. For services to Engineering.
- Tanuja Randery. Managing Director and Vice President, Amazon Web Services, Europe, Middle East, and Africa. For services to Business and the Technology Sector.
- Professor Andrew Randewich. Executive Director Science, Atomic Weapons Establishment. For services to Defence.
- Helene Reardon-Bond OBE. Lately Deputy Chief of Staff to the Leader of the Labour Party. For Political Service.
- Timothy Iain Reeve. Deputy Director and Chief Operating Officer, Victoria and Albert Museum. For services to Museums.
- Dr. Patrick Roger Roach. Lately General Secretary, National Association of Schoolmasters Union of Women Teachers. For services to Education.
- Sally Robinson. Director of Children's Services, Hartlepool Borough Council. For services to Children.
- Stephen Scrimshaw. Lately Chief Executive Officer, Siemens Energy Ltd. For services to British Manufacturing, to Transport and to the Green Transition to Net Zero.
- Stuart James Shilson. Lately Chair, St John Ambulance. For services to the Order of St John and to Change Management.
- Professor Emily Fleur Shuckburgh OBE. Professor of Environmental Data Science and Director, Cambridge Zero, University of Cambridge. For services to Climate Science and to the Public Communication of Climate Science.
- Professor Jagtar Singh OBE. Lately Chair, Coventry and Warwickshire Partnership NHS Trust. For services to the NHS.
- Nicholas Michael William Smallwood FREng. Lately Chief Executive Officer, Infrastructure and Projects Authority. For services to Infrastructure and Project Delivery.
- Professor Liam Smeeth. Director, London School of Hygiene & Tropical Medicine. For services to Public Health and Education.
- Andy Smith. Strategic Director of People Services, Derby City Council. For services to Disadvantaged and Vulnerable Children.
- Christine Anne Smith KC. Chair, Urology Services Inquiry. For services to Public Inquiries in Northern Ireland.
- Marie Clare Stone. Deputy Director, Ministry of Defence. For services to Defence.
- Dana Strong. Group Chief Executive Officer, Sky. For services to Business and to Media.
- Professor Elizabeth Matilda Tansey OBE FMedSci. Division of Biosciences, University College London and William Harvey Research Institute, Queen Mary University London. For services to the Understanding and Promotion of Medical History and Science.
- Carol Edwina Taylor. Employment Judge. For services to Justice and to Judicial Diversity and Inclusion.
- Benjamin John Terrett. Chief Executive Officer, Public Digital and lately Deputy Chair, University of the Arts London. For services to Design.
- Michael Tobin OBE. Philanthropist and Fundraiser. For services to Charity.
- Jane Tranter. Chief Executive Officer and Co-Founder, Bad Wolf. For services to Television.
- Stephen Andrew Varley. Lately UK Chair and Managing Partner, EY. For services to the Professional Services Industry.
- Sarah Virginia Wade OBE. For services to Tennis and to Charity.
- Faith Helen Wainwright MBE FREng. Lately Director, Arup. For services to Engineering.
- Philip Arthur Walker. Chair of Council, University of Roehampton. For services to Higher Education.
- David Ward. General Secretary, Communication Workers' Union. For services to Trade Unions.
- Dr. John Macgill Watson OBE. Businessman and Philanthropist. For services to Education and to Charity.
- Jemma Rosanne Wiseman (Jemma Read). Global Head of Corporate Philanthropy, Bloomberg LP. For services to Philanthropy.
- Gillian Ann Worgan. Principal and Chief Executive, West Herts College Group. For services to Further Education.

International

- Christian Salbaing. Deputy Chairman, Europe, Hutchison Whampoa (Europe) Ltd. For services to Investment in the UK.
- Valerie Taylor, OBE. Founder, Centre for the Rehabilitation of the Paralysed, Bangladesh. For services to Disadvantaged People in Bangladesh.

==== Officer of the Order of the British Empire (OBE) ====
Military

- Commander Jon James Browett
- Commander Christopher Charles Evans
- Lieutenant Colonel Paul Stanley Fitzpatrick
- Captain Pollyanna Hatchard
- Lieutenant Colonel Liam Michael Metcalfe
- Captain Eugene Peter Morgan, RD, Royal Naval Reserve
- Lieutenant Colonel Alexander Nicholas Pounds
- Colonel Patrick Andrew Allen
- Lieutenant Colonel Rupert Timothy Anderson, The Royal Gurkha Rifles
- Major Paul Christopher Carney, Corps of Royal Engineers
- Lieutenant Colonel Joanne Patrice D’Arcy, Royal Army Medical Service
- Colonel Stephen Weatherley Davies, Army Reserve
- Lieutenant Colonel Stuart Jon Young Elford, The Princess of Wales’s Royal Regiment
- Lieutenant Colonel James Robert Green, Grenadier Guards
- Lieutenant Colonel Glenis Jane Helena Maloney, Royal Corps of Signals, Army Reserve
- Lieutenant Colonel Douglas Andrew Wyville Nelson, Corps of Royal Engineers
- Colonel Richard David Newland
- Lieutenant Colonel Steven Carnell Pengilly, The Rifles
- Lieutenant Colonel Frank Stanley Reeves, MBE, The Royal Regiment of Scotland
- Group Captain Andrew Phillip Baron
- Group Captain Paul Baroni
- Group Captain Hannah Mary Bishop
- Group Captain Rachel Louise Dixon
- Wing Commander Gemma Ann Lonsdale
- Wing Commander Timothy Charles Page
- Wing Commander Ankur Narendra Pandya

Civil

- Dr. Sayed Ali Abbas. For services to Peacebuilding and to Interfaith Dialogue.
- Robert Alexander. For services to Leadership in the NHS.
- Professor Robin Raihan Ali, FMedSci. Professor of Human Molecular Genetics, King 's College London. For services to Gene and Cell Therapies.
- Karen Anne Allen. Deputy Director, Northern Place Based Team and European Social Fund Programmes, Department for Education. For services to Further Education.
- Paul Joseph Anticoni. Chief Executive Officer, World Jewish Relief. For services to Vulnerable People.
- Tony Armstrong. Chief Executive Officer, Locality. For services to Local Community Organisations.
- Sunita Arora. Founder, The Arora Charitable Foundation. For services to the Charitable Sector and to Philanthropy.
- Matthew Austin. Team Leader, Ministry of Defence. For services to Defence.
- Dr. Stephen Baker. Scottish Government Trade Envoy to Japan. For services to Scotland-Japan Trade and Investment.
- Wayne Alan Bantick. Programme Manager, Defence Equipment and Support. For services to Defence.
- Professor Stephen Matthew Barnett. Chair, North West Anglia NHS Foundation Trust. For services to the NHS.
- Craig Beaumont. Executive Director, Federation of Small Businesses. For services to Small Businesses.
- Avinderjit Bhatia. Chief Nurse, Guy's and St Thomas' NHS Foundation Trust. For services to the NHS and Nursing.
- Professor Joanne Blanden. Professor in Economics, University of Surrey. For services to Economics.
- Paul Boucher. Director, Lincolnshire Traveller Initiative. For services to the Traveller Community.
- Carole Mary Boulanger. Consultant Nurse and Advanced Critical Care Practitioner, Royal Devon University Healthcare NHS Foundation Trust, and Board Member, The Faculty of Intensive Care Medicine. For services to Critical Care.
- Professor Peter Andrew Brennan. Consultant Oral and Maxillofacial Surgeon, and Honorary Professor of Surgery, Portsmouth Hospitals University NHS Trust. For services to Surgery and Patient Safety.
- Peter Briggs. Senior Principal Engineer, Positioning, Navigation and Timing, Defence Science and Technology Laboratory. For services to Defence and Security.
- Lorraine Britton. Lead Speech and Language Therapist, Trent Regional Cleft Network. For services to Children with Cleft Lip and Palate.
- Professor Karen Elizabeth Broadhurst. Professor of Social Work, Lancaster University. For services to Child and Family Justice Research.
- The Reverend Canon Dr. Malcolm Arthur Brown. Lately Director of Faith and Public Life, Church of England. For services to the Public Witness of the Church of England.
- Alistair Edward Brownlee, MBE. For services to Triathlon and to Charity.
- Tracy Buckingham. Deputy Director, Security and Cyber Security Exports, Department for Business and Trade. For services to Exports.
- Angus Campbell. Company Director, Kilbride Shellfish Ltd. For services to the Scottish Fishing Industry
- Dr. Wayne Campbell. Lately Academic Registrar, University of York. For services to Higher Education.
- Gareth Roger John Capner. Lately Chair, Housing Design Awards. For services to Good Quality Housing.
- Neil Thomas Carberry. Chief Executive Officer, The Recruitment and Employment Confederation. For services to the Economy and to Business.
- Professor Stephan Charles Chambers. For services to Social Enterprise and to Philanthropy.
- Professor Andrew James Charlton-Perez. For services to Climate Science and to Education.
- John Alan Clarfelt. Founder, Ticketer. For services to the Bus Sector.
- Dr. Jamie Clarke. Chief Executive Officer, Tove Learning Trust. For services to Education.
- Melanie Clark. Health, Safety and Wellbeing Director, National Highways. For services to the Road Network.
- Professor Lucie Dale Cluver. Professor of Child and Family Social Work, University of Oxford. For services to Children 's Wellbeing and to Global Public Health.
- Peter Cohen. Lately Headteacher, Oak Bank School, Bedfordshire. For services to Education.
- Monica Collings. Lately Chief Executive, So Energy. For services to Diversity in the Energy Sector.
- Iona Colvin. Chief Social Work Adviser, Scottish Government. For services to Social Work.
- Dr. Jolene Cook. Head of International Climate Science, Department for Energy Security and Net Zero. For services to International Climate Science.
- Andrew Copson. Chief Executive, Humanists UK. For services to the Non-Religious Community.
- Dr. Christine Estelle Counsell. Director, Opening Worlds. For services to Education.
- Mark Couzens. Team Leader, Ministry of Defence. For services to Defence.
- Davin Anthony Crowley-Sweet. Chief Data Officer, National Highways. For services to the Safety of the Road Network.
- Professor Christina Cunliffe. Chief Executive and Principal, The College of Health. For services to Health Education.
- Brenda Vanessa Dacres. Mayor of Lewisham. For Political and Public Service.
- Stephen William Dance. Director, National Infrastructure and Service Transformation Authority. For services to Major Infrastructure Project Delivery.
- Joanne Darbyshire. Co-Founder, National Leasehold Campaign. For services to Housing and to Leaseholders.
- Peter John Davies. Director and Owner, Southern Antennae Ltd. For services to Charity.
- Victoria Anne Davies. Chief Executive, Danske Bank UK. For services to the Economy in Northern Ireland.
- Howard Dawber. Deputy Mayor of London for Business and Growth, London Assembly and Chair, London and Partners. For services to Local Government and to the community in East London.
- Elizabeth Dean. Lately Executive Director, Corporate Development and Delivery, Liverpool City Region Combined Authority. For services to Transport.
- Julie Deville. Chief Executive Officer, Extol Academy Trust. For services to Education.
- Marion Dickson. Executive Director of Nursing, Midwifery and Allied Health Professionals, and Executive Director for Surgery and Community Services, Northumbria Healthcare NHS Foundation Trust. For services to the NHS.
- Jill Dilks, DL. Chair, National Approved Premises Association. For services to Residents of Approved Premises and to the Wider Criminal Justice System.
- Professor Lynn Dobbs. Lately Vice-Chancellor, London Metropolitan University. For services to Higher Education.
- Anita Dobson. Philanthropist, Fundraiser and Patron. For services to Charitable Fundraising and to Philanthropy.
- Professor Anthony Dorling. Lately Professor of Transplant Inflammation and Repair, Guy's and St Thomas' NHS Foundation Trust and King's College London. For services to Kidney Patient Care.
- Nicholas Ashley Down. Head of Payments, HM Revenue and Customs. For services to the Transformation of Tax Payment Services.
- Michael John Downes. Director of Music, University of St Andrews. For services to Music and Education.
- Allison Dowzell. Managing Director, Screen Alliance Wales. For services to Broadcasting.
- Louise Mary Edwards. Chair, Women in Bus and Coach and lately Head, TfL Buses and Hull Trains. For services to the Transport Sector and to Diversity.
- Dr. Stefanie Guene Edwards. Lately Chief Executive Officer, Learn Academies Trust, Leicestershire. For services to Education.
- Harris Wayne Engelbert Elliott. Artist, Curator and Stylist. For services to the Arts and to Cultural Diversity.
- Peter Alun Eslea MacDonald. Head of Research, Scottish Tartans Authority. For services to the Tartan Industry.
- John Evans. Lately Group Principal and Chief Executive Officer, Cornwall College Group. For services to Further Education.
- Martin Fairley. Service Delivery Manager, Scottish Police Authority Forensic Services. For services to Criminal Justice.
- Alex James Farquharson. Director, Tate Britain. For services to Art.
- Lisa Fathers. Deputy Chief Executive Officer, Bright Futures Educational Trust. For services to Education.
- Rosie Bess Ferguson. Chair and Trustee, Association of Chief Executives of Voluntary Organisations. For services to Charity and Charity Governance.
- Susan Elizabeth Ferns. Deputy General Secretary, Prospect Trade Union. For services to Green Jobs and Workforce Transition.
- Paul Charles Flaum. Chief Executive Officer, Bourne Leisure. For services to the Hospitality, Travel and Leisure Industries, to Holocaust Education and to Charity.
- Anthony Frederick Ernest Fletcher. Project Delivery Director, Property Directorate, Ministry of Justice. For Public Service.
- Professor David Vincent Ford. Professor of Informatics, Swansea University. For services to Social Science.
- Professor Adam Tobias Fox. Professor of Paediatric Allergy, Guy's and St Thomas' NHS Foundation Trust, and Chair, National Allergy Strategy Group. For services to Paediatric Allergy.
- Peter Francis. Chief of Staff, Commonwealth War Graves Commission. For services to Global Commemoration.
- Alice Shona Johnston Frost. Director, Knowledge Exchange. For services to Research Innovation.
- Janet Gardner. Chief Executive Officer and Principal, Waltham Forest College. For services to Further Education.
- Rachel Helen Gardner-Poole. Director, Aviascia. For services to Aviation.
- Zoe Erin Gascoyne. Deputy Director, Offshore Corporate and Wealthy, HM Revenue and Customs. For services to Complex Tax Investigations.
- Hannah Gibson. Chief Executive Officer, Ocado Retail. For services to Retail.
- Mark David Gifford. Lately Chief Executive Officer, National Citizen Service. For Public Service.
- Stephen Bernard Albert Frederick Henry Giles-Medhurst. Councillor and Council Leader, Three Rivers Council. For services to Local Government.
- Kerry Marina Glazer. Chair, AAR and Untold Studios and Trustee, The National Advertising and Benevolent Society. For services to the Advertising and Communication Industries and to Charity.
- Keith Glazier. Councillor and Leader, East Sussex County Council. For Public Service.
- Ivo Antony Gormley. Founder, GoodGym. For services to Social Enterprise.
- Nicola Jane Granger. Chief Information and Financial Officer, North Sea Transition Authority. For services to Digital Transformation.
- Christopher Edward Wastie Green. For services to the Railway.
- Sian Elizabeth Hampton. Chief Executive Officer, Archway Learning Trust. For services to Education.
- Verity Anne Hancock. Lately Principal and Chief Executive Officer, Leicester College. For services to Further Education.
- Ruth Anna Handcock. Chief Executive Officer, Octopus Money. For services to Financial Services and Investment.
- John George Hawkins. Director, Resettlement Services, Home Office. For Public Service.
- Deta Hedman. For services to Darts and to Charity.
- Paulette Henry. Co-Founder, Black Rootz. For services to Tackling Racial Injustice in the Horticulture and Agricultural Sectors.
- Professor Peter James Higgins. Chair, Field Studies Council. For services to the Environment and Outdoor Education.
- Nicholas Piers Huxley Hillman. Director, Higher Education Policy Institute. For services to Higher Education.
- Peter John Hinton. Lately Chief Executive, Chartered Institute for Archaeologists. For services to Archaeology and Heritage.
- Rita Hirani. Strategic Advisor and Lately Chief Executive Officer, MindOut. For services to Women, to the LGBTQ+ Community, and to Victims of Domestic Abuse.
- Dr. Veronica Barbara Holland. Lately Head of Violence Against the Person Branch, Department of Justice, Northern Ireland Civil Service. For Public Service.
- Phillip Courtney Holliday. Border Force Regional Director, Central Region, Home Office. For Public Service.
- Paul Thomas Keith Holmes. Senior Director of Investigations, Office of the Police Ombudsman for Northern Ireland. For Public Service.
- Susan Ann Horne, MBE. Lately Head of Space Exploration, UK Space Agency. For services to Space Exploration.
- Richard Andrew Howells. Founder, Bronze Software Labs Ltd. For services to Business, Technology and Innovation.
- Keith Robert Hughes. Lately Head of Submarine Structures, Submarine Delivery Agency. For services to Defence.
- Mohammed Umar Hussain, MBE. Police Staff, Chief Finance Officer, South Wales Police. For services to Policing.
- Rebekah Jane Iiyambo. Chief Executive Officer, Eko Trust. For services to Education.
- Richard Howard Jackson. Founder, Gate Safe. For services to the Improvement of the Safety of Automated Gates.
- Ryan Jacob. Team Leader, Ministry of Defence. For services to Defence.
- Professor Muhammad Afzal Javed. Consultant Psychiatrist, Coventry and Warwickshire Partnership NHS Trust and Lately Honorary Associate Clinical Professor, University of Warwick. For services to Mental Health.
- Geraint Wyn Jenkins. Head of Crime and Cross-Cutting, Digital and Technology Services, HM Courts and Tribunals Service. For Public Service.
- Christina Jones. Chief Executive Officer, River Tees Multi Academy Trust. For services to Education.
- Pooja Kanda. Anti-Knife Crime Campaigner, Justice for Ronan. For services to the Prevention of Knife Crime.
- Professor Sano Allan Kellehear. Professor, Department of Social Work, Education and Community Wellbeing, Northumbria University. For services to Palliative Care.
- Katie Kendrick. Councillor, Cheshire West and Cheshire Council and Co-Founder, National Leasehold Campaign. For services to Housing and Leaseholders.
- Dr. Peter Richard Kent. Chair of Trustees, The Griffin Primary School, Warwickshire. For services to Education.
- Mark King. Founder, Oliver King Foundation. For services to Public Health.
- James Robert Dominic Korner. Vice President, Foundling Museum, Trustee, Foyle Foundation and Chair, Andrew Croft Memorial Fund. For services to Philanthropy and to Charity.
- Richard Leslie Kramer. Lately Chief Executive Officer, Sense and Sense International. For services to People with Disabilities.
- Stephen Lambert. Television Producer and Executive. For services to Television.
- Professor Shirley Christine Lane (Shirley Price). Emerita Professor of Toxicology, University of Surrey. For services to Industry and Consumer Protection.
- Yvonne Cecelia Elizabeth Leavy (Yvonne Sibson). Lead Epilepsy Nurse, NHS Lothian. For services to Epilepsy Nursing.
- Piers Frank Bruce Le Marquand. Senior Lawyer, Department for Transport Legal Team, Government Legal Department. For services to the Legal Profession.
- Professor Timothy Michael Lenton. Founding Director, Global Systems Institute, University of Exeter, and Chair in Climate Change and Earth System Science. For services to Understanding Climate Tipping Points.
- David Wyndham Lewis. Founder, Young Voices. For services to Music.
- Sian Lewis-Williams, QPM. Officer, National Crime Agency. For services to Law Enforcement.
- Amanda Lisle. Team Leader, Ministry of Defence. For services to Defence.
- Angela Lockwood. Lately Chief Executive Officer, North Star Housing. For services to Disadvantaged People in the North East.
- Andrew Michael Love. Senior Adviser, The Ritz London. For services to Hospitality.
- Dr. Adam Charles Graham Lowe. Director, Factum Arte and Founder, Factum Foundation for Digital Technology in Preservation. For services to the Arts.
- Keith Lawrence Ludeman. Chair of HS1 Limited and Chair of the London Transport Museum. For services to Transport.
- Mila Lukic. Founder and Chief Executive Officer, Bridges Outcomes Partnerships. For services to Social Enterprise.
- Dr. Joshua Macabuag, FREng. Co-Founder and Chief Product Officer, Renew-Risk, and Engineering Manager, Search and Rescue Assistance in Disasters. For services to Disaster Search and Rescue Engineering.
- Catherine Anne Macdonald (Kiki Macdonald). Co-Founder and Trustee, Euan's Guide. For services to People with Disabilities.
- Dr. Alastair John MacGilchrist. Chair, Scottish Health Action on Alcohol Problems. For services to Medicine and Public Health.
- Claire Odette Mack. Chief Executive Officer, Scottish Renewables. For services to the Economy and to Business.
- Professor Caroline Mackie Ogilvie. Lately Consultant Clinical Scientist in Genetics, South East Genomics Laboratory Hub, Guy's and St Thomas' NHS Foundation Trust. For services to Patients with Genetic Disorders.
- John Grant Macrae. For Charitable Services in Scotland.
- Linda Patricia Magistris. Founder and Chief Executive Officer, The Good Grief Trust. For services to Supporting Bereaved People.
- Andrew Makower. Clerk of Procedural Practice, House of Lords. For services to Parliament.
- Devon Malcolm. For services to Cricket and to Diversity in Cricket.
- Lisa Mannall. Lately Chief Executive Officer, Cornwall Education Learning Trust and Department for Education Regional Schools Commissioner in the South West. For services to Education.
- Noel George Herbert Manns. Chair, Conservative Agents' Superannuation Fund. For Political and Public Service.
- Luke Henry Walter March. For services to Healthcare and Charitable Causes.
- Mariella Marzano. Principal Social Scientist, Forest Research. For services to Forestry.
- Theresa Mary Mason. Chair, Bradford Diocesan Academies Trust. For services to Education.
- Professor Stephen Anthony May. Emeritus Professor, Royal Veterinary College. For services to Veterinary Education and Animals in Science.
- Lyssa McGowan. Chief Executive Officer, Pets at Home. For services to Retail.
- Kate McGrath. Artistic Director and Chief Executive Officer, Fuel. For services to Theatre.
- Roslyn Elizabeth McMullan. For services to Mental Health and Wellbeing in the Dentistry Profession in Northern Ireland.
- Dawn McNally. Group Chief Executive, Age UK North Tyneside. For Charitable Services to Older People in the North East.
- Kevin McNulty. Deputy Head, Martyn 's Law Policy Team, Home Office. For services to National Security.
- Brian Robert Mcritchie. Philanthropist and Ambassador, The King's Trust. For services to Philanthropy and to Charity.
- Michael Charles Mellor, BEM. Co-Ordinator, The National Miners ' Memorial, National Memorial Arboretum. For services to Heritage and to Recognition of the Mining Community.
- Professor Natasha Merat. Chair, Human Factors of Transport Systems, University of Leeds. For services to Future Transport Systems.
- Lynne Mills. Cluster Manager, Criminal Courts, HM Courts and Tribunals Service Wales. For Public Service.
- Michael Peter Mills. Governor, HM Prison and Young Offender Institution Hatfield. For Public Service.
- Rose-Marie Lisa Moore. Advanced Customer Support Senior Leader, Department of Work and Pensions. For services to Vulnerable People.
- Professor Brian Morgan. Director of the Creative Leadership and Enterprise Centre, Cardiff Metropolitan University. For services to the Welsh Economy.
- Dr. Samantha Jane Morton. Actress. For services to Drama and to Charity.
- Duncan Andrew Moss. Technical Relationship Consultant, Ordnance Survey. For services to Technical Consultancy and to Government Resilience.
- Mary Elizabeth Murphy. Principal and Chief Executive Officer, Riverside College Widnes & Runcorn, Halton. For services to Further Education.
- Taryn Jane Pearson Nixon. Director, Taryn Nixon Heritage Works and Trustee, National Lottery Heritage Fund. For services to Archaeology and Heritage.
- Lorna Norgrove. Trustee and Co-Founder, Linda Norgrove Foundation. For services to Women and Children Abroad and in Scotland.
- John Richard Norgrove. Co-Founder, Linda Norgrove Foundation. For services to Women and Children Abroad and in Scotland.
- Wayne Colin Norrie. Chief Executive Officer, The Greenwood Academies Trust. For services to Education.
- Nour Al-Houda Balich Norris. Campaigner at SecureLife and Advocate for Raneem 's Law. For services to Preventing Violence Against Women and Girls.
- The Right Reverend Kenneth Anthony Adam Nowakowski. Bishop, Ukrainian Catholic Eparchy of the Holy Family of London. For services to Ukrainians.
- Robin Marius Osterley. Chief Executive, Charity Retail Association. For services to Charity.
- Dr. Kulin Kantilal Patel. Veterinary Advisor for International Trade, Department for Environment, Food and Rural Affairs. For services to Animal Health and to International Trade.
- Terence Edward Pateman. Chair, Northern Amateur Football League. For services to Grassroots Sport and to Community Relations.
- Stephen Michael Pegge. Lately Managing Director, UK Finance. For services to Business.
- Major (Rtd) Charles Matthew Pelling. Manager, Lady Haig Poppy Factory, Poppy Scotland. For services to Veterans.
- Rasheed Nicholas John Pendry. Director of Practice, Children's Services, Wandsworth Borough Council. For services to Children and Family Social Care.
- Richard Telford Perry. Head of Northern Engagement, Department for Transport. For services to Transport in the North of England.
- David Keith Pickard. Lately Director, BBC Proms. For services to Music.
- Andrew Powell. Team Leader, Ministry of Defence. For services to Defence.
- Dr. Michael Charles Prentice. National Director for NHS Resilience, NHS England. For services to the NHS.
- Ian Price. Director, Confederation of British Industry, Wales. For services to Business and to Charity.
- Russell Charles Prior. Chair, The London Community Foundation. For services to Charity and to Philanthropy.
- Vaibhav Puri. Director of Sector Strategy and Transformation, Rail Safety and Standards Board. For services to Rail Safety and Standards.
- Phil Anthony Raby Smith (Phil Smith). Director General, Incorporated Society of British Advertisers. For services to the Advertising and Marketing Industries.
- Professor Judith Rankin. Professor of Maternal and Child Health, University of Newcastle. For services to Maternal and Child Health and Research Inclusion.
- Peter Geraint Richards, MVO. President, Institute of Chartered Foresters. For services to the Forestry Sector.
- Claire Riley. Chair, Seven Stories. For services to Children 's Literacy and to Health.
- Grant James Ritchie. Associate Director, College Development Network, lately Board Member, Scottish Funding Council and lately Principal, Dundee and Angus College. For services to Further Education.
- Francesca Marie Roberts. Lately Chief Executive Officer, CRASH Charity. For services to Homelessness Charities and Hospices.
- Nicholas John Robinson. Co-Founder and Chair, Future Talent Charity. For services to Disadvantaged Young People, to Charitable Fundraising and to Music.
- Sara Louise Ford Robinson. Probation Director, National Security Division. For Public Service.
- Francis Leigh Rothwell. Philanthropist and Fundraiser, Alzheimer 's Research UK. For charitable services to Dementia Research.
- Mohammad Sadique (Sid Sadique). Chairman and Owner, Electra Commercial Vehicles Ltd. For services to the Automotive and Transport Industry.
- Giulia Maria Said. Chief Executive Officer, Advantage Travel Partnership. For services to Business and to Tourism.
- Isaac Samuels. Co-Chair, Partnership Board, Think Local Act Personal and Co-Chair, National Co-Production Advisory Group. For services to Adult Social Care.
- Darius Sarosh. Founder, The Erach and Roshan Sadri Foundation. For services to Philanthropy.
- Professor Simon Reza Saunders, FREng. Honorary Professor, University of Bristol. For services to Telecommunications.
- Dr. Lesley Ann Schatzberger. Founder and Volunteer, Jessie's Fund. For services to Children with LifeLimiting Illnesses and Communication Difficulties.
- Finlay Thomas Kennedy Scott. Co-Founder and Lately Chair, The Clink Charity. For services to Ex-Offenders.
- Professor Hanifa Unisa Shah. Pro Vice-Chancellor, Birmingham City University. For services to Higher Education.
- Professor Pankaj Sharma. Director, Institute of Cardiovascular Research, Royal Holloway University of London. For services to Research in Strokes in South Asian People.
- Hannah Marie Sidaway. Specialist Prosecutor, Crown Prosecution Service. For services to Law and Order.
- Ranjit Singh. Vice Principal for Quality and Learner Experience, Hull College. For services to Further Education.
- Dr. Parag Singhal. Consultant Endocrinologist, Weston Area Health NHS Trust. For services to Health Education and Black and Minority Ethnic Doctors.
- Professor Fang Gao Smith, FMedSci. Professor of Anaesthesia, Critical Care and Pain, University of Birmingham and University Hospitals Birmingham NHS Foundation Trust. For services to Anaesthesia.
- Dr. Kevin Smith. Officer, National Crime Agency. For services to Law Enforcement.
- Captain Jagjit Singh Sohal. Chair, WW1 Sikh Memorial Fund. For services to the Commemoration of Commonwealth Soldiers who served Great Britain.
- Shaun Mark Spiers. Executive Director, Green Alliance. For services to Environmental Policy and Sustainability.
- Gareth Rhys Stapleton. Founder and Partner, RiSE International. For services to Architecture and to Project and Construction Management.
- Sarah Jane Steel. Lately Chair of Trustees, National Day Nurseries Association and Chief Executive Officer, The Old Station Nursery Group. For services to Early Years Education.
- Alexander James Samuel Stewart. Senior Statistician, Office of the Chief Economic Adviser, Scottish Government. For services to Scottish Economic Statistics.
- Dr. Gillian Margaret Stewart. Director of Qualifications Development, Scottish Qualifications Authority. For services to Education.
- Professor Gerard Thomas Stoker. Chair of Governance, University of Southampton. For services to Local Governance and to the Study of Democracy.
- David Dewar Storrar. Head of Edinburgh Region, Historic Environment Scotland. For services to Heritage.
- Nicholas Lawson Stroud. Head of Accountancy Profession, Serious Fraud Office. For services to the Administration of Justice.
- Stephen John Sutherland. Commercial Manager, Charlton Athletic Football Club. For services to Sport.
- Dr. Diane Swift. Trustee, The Creative Learning Partnership Trust, Stafford, Staffordshire. For services to Education.
- Beverley Felicia Tarka. Lately President, Directors of Adult Social Services. For services to Adult Social Care and Unpaid Carers.
- Dari Jean Taylor. Lately Member of Parliament for Stockton South. For Political and Public Service.
- Richard Brian Taylor. Governor, Northern Ireland Prison Service. For Public Service.
- Ruth Elizabeth Taylor. For services to Victims and Survivors of Domestic Abuse.
- Professor David John Thomas (Dafydd Thomas). Lately Professor Emeritus of Clinical Neuroscience, Imperial College and Imperial College Healthcare NHS Trust. For services to Clinical Neuroscience.
- Professor Russell Adrian Stanton Thomas. Science Area Leader, Medical Radiation Science, National Physical Laboratory. For services to Radiotherapy and Cancer Treatment.
- Professor Sophie Thomas. Designer. For services to Sustainable Design. Elizabeth Tickle. Officer, National Crime Agency. For services to Law Enforcement.
- Catharina Adriana Maria van Doorn. Head of Congenital Cardiac Surgery and Consultant Cardiac Surgeon, The Leeds Teaching Hospitals NHS Trust. For services to Children 's Heart Surgery and to Charity.
- Monica Josephine Vaughan. For services to Sport.
- Peter Edward Waine. For services to the Natural Environment.
- Alasdair William McKinnon Wallace. Head, Civil, Family, Courts and Tribunals Team, Ministry of Justice and Government Legal Department. For services to Civil Justice.
- Richard Alan Warren. For services to Mountain Rescue in Cumbria and the Lake District.
- Robert James Warren. Director of People and Development, Lancashire Fire and Rescue Service. For services to Fire and Rescue.
- Karen Valerie Watt. Lately Chief Executive Officer, Scottish Funding Council. For Public Service.
- Vivien Watts. Founder and Chief Executive Officer, Hope4Kidz. For services to Charity and to the community in the North East.
- Tracy Ann Westall. Non-Executive Director, Department for Transport. For services to the Digital Sector and to Diversity.
- Sian Eleri Westerman. Lately Senior Adviser, Rothschild & Co. For services to Fashion and Beauty and to Charity.
- John Joseph Whiston. Managing Director, Continuing Drama and Head of ITV in the North, ITV Studios. For services to Broadcasting and to Television.
- Professor Iain Stuart Whitaker. Professor of Plastic Surgery, Swansea University Medical School and the Welsh Centre for Burns and Plastic Surgery. For services to Plastic Surgery.
- John William Whitaker. Lately Distinguished Specialist, Atomic Weapons Establishment. For services to Defence.
- Simon Gerard White. Lately Chief Executive Officer, Vision Academy Learning Trust. For services to Education.
- Jane Whitehart. International Lead Associate Consultant, People1st International Limited. For services to International Trade.
- William Elliott Whitehorn. For services to the Aerospace Industry.
- Susan Linda Wilkinson. Trustee and Chair, Finance and Audit Committee, Churches Conservation Trust. For services to Heritage.
- Catherine Ann Williams. Co-Founder, National Leasehold Campaign. For services to Housing and to Leaseholder.
- Alastair John Wilson. Chief Executive Officer, School for Social Entrepreneurs, Co-Founder and Director, Tonic Housing and Chair, The Foyer Federation. For services to Business and to Charity.
- John Richard Wilson. Legal Team Manager, Ofgem. For Public Service.
- Michael William Winstanley. President, National Conservative Convention and lately North West Conservative Party Regional Chairman. For Political and Public Service.
- Derek Winter, DL. Lately Deputy Chief Coroner England and Wales, HM Senior Coroner City of Sunderland. For Public Service
- Stuart Worden. Principal, The BRIT School. For services to Creative Arts Education, to Music and to the Creative Industries.
- Professor Susan Mary Yeandle. Professor of Sociology, University of Sheffield. For services to Research into Care and Caring.
- Thomas Edwin Yendell. For services to Young People with Disabilities.

International

- Professor Michael Bentley. Professor of Geography, Durham University. For services to Antarctic and Sub-Antarctic Science.
- Professor James Brown. Discipline Leader (Maths), University of Technology, Sydney. For services to Statistics in the United Kingdom and internationally.
- Dr. Mary Bunn. Palliative Care Doctor, Sierra Leone; Trustee of Hospice Africa UK. For services to the Development of Palliative Care in Sierra Leone.
- Simon Bush. Director of Neglected Tropical Diseases, Sightsavers. For services to the Control and Elimination of Global Neglected Tropical Diseases.
- David Carter. Team Leader, Foreign, Commonwealth and Development Office. For services to National Security.
- Professor Christopher Clapham. Retired Professor, The Centre of African Studies, Cambridge University. For services to Academia, Foreign Policy, and UK relations with the Horn of Africa.
- Professor Kevin Featherstone. Emeritus Professor (European Institute) and Professorial Research Fellow at the Hellenic Observatory, London School of Economics. For services to Academia and to UK/Greece relations.
- Matthew Featherstone. President, Cricket Brazil. For services to Sport and Disadvantaged Communities, Women and Girls Overseas.
- Dr. Yvonne Greenstreet. Chief Executive Officer, Alnylam Pharmaceuticals. For services to the UK/US Biotechnology and Life Sciences Industry.
- Edward Hannah. Head of Overseas Estates Department and Chief Engineer, Estates, Security & Network Directorate, Foreign, Commonwealth and Development Office. For services to British Foreign Policy.
- Christopher Campbell-Holt. Registrar and Chief Executive of the Astana International Finance Centre Court and International Arbitration Centre, Kazakhstan. For services to the Rule of Law and the English Common Law.
- Dulcie James. Policy advisor for the Ministry of Finance, and Retired Commissioner, Financial Services Commission, Montserrat. For services to Public and Financial services and Community Development in Montserrat.
- Dr. Anne Kerr. Chair of the British Chamber of Commerce in Hong Kong; Global Head of Cities and Managing Director Greater China, Mott MacDonald, Hong Kong. For services to UK Business and Trade.
- Dr. Martin Milton. Director, International Bureau of Weights and Measures (Bureau International des Poids et Mesures, BIPM). For services to Measurement Science.
- Dr. Robin Milton. Lately Deputy Director, Humanitarian Development & Economic Department, Eastern Europe and Central Asia Directorate, Foreign, Commonwealth and Development Office. For services to British Foreign Policy.
- Michael Nithavrianakis, MVO. Lately British Ambassador to Somalia. For services to British Foreign Policy and to Education in Pakistan.
- Stephen Palmer. Team Leader, Foreign, Commonwealth and Development Office. For services to National Security.
- Professor Andrew Rowland, JP. Officer for Child Protection, the Royal College of Paediatrics and Child Health; Board Member, M’Lop Tapang; Chair of the Board of Trustees, SicKids. For services to Safeguarding and the Protection of Children’s Rights.
- Kirsty Smith. Chief Executive Officer, CBM UK. For services to People Living with Disabilities Overseas.
- Professor Mary Steen. Professor of Midwifery, Curtin University and King Edward Memorial Hospital, Perth, Australia. For services to Midwifery and Maternal and Familial Health research.
- Martyn Stewart. Nature Sound Recordist. For Services to the Natural World.
- Billy Stewart, MBE. Lately Development Director, British Consulate General Jerusalem. For services to International Development.
- Sarah Surgenor. Team Leader, Foreign, Commonwealth and Development Office. For services to National Security.
- Ann Swampillai. Deputy Director, Foreign, Commonwealth and Development Office. For services to National Security.
- Helen Twist. Lately Private Secretary to the Permanent Under-Secretaries of the Foreign, Commonwealth and Development Office. For services to British Foreign Policy.
- Professor Natalie Waran. Emeritus Professor (One Welfare), the Eastern Institute of Technology, Honorary Professor, University of Edinburgh and Hartpury University; Director, Companion Animals New Zealand Good Life for Animals Centre. For services to Equine Welfare, Research and Education.
- Professor Andrew Westby. Deputy Vice-Chancellor, Research and Knowledge Exchange, University of Greenwich; Former Director, Natural Resources Institute. For services to Research in Food Security and Leadership of the Natural Resources Institute.

==== Member of the Order of the British Empire (MBE) ====
Military

- Lieutenant Commander William George Barker
- Major Lewis Bodycote
- Chief Petty Officer Air Engineering Technician (Avionics) Rhys Dyas
- Commander Daniel Glover
- Warrant Officer 1 Information Operations Robert Govier, Royal Naval Reserve
- Warrant Officer 1 Air Engineering Technician (Mechanical) Michael Hart
- Commander Carla Lisa Higgins
- Warrant Officer 1 Warfare Specialist (Underwater Warfare) Robin McColl
- Lieutenant Commander Hugo Christopher Mitchell-Heggs
- Surgeon Commander Matthew Alec Osborne
- Major Lee Andrew Stewart
- Commander James Tibbitts
- Chief Petty Officer Air Engineering Technician (Mechanical) Robert Lee Warnett
- Chief Petty Officer Warfare Specialist (Abovewater Warfare Weapons) Michael Watson
- Warrant Officer Class 2 Mehmet Alan Asir, VR
- Lieutenant Colonel Katherine Frances Badham-Thornhill
- Major Timothy Richard Barker
- Lieutenant Colonel Kevin Kenneth Bingham, VR
- Major Stephen Barry Brown
- Staff Sergeant Gordon Alexander Bruce
- Lieutenant Colonel Stephen John Candlin
- Major Christopher Michael Roy Danby
- Major Neil Alan Richard Donaghy
- Captain Michael Wayne Eynon, VR
- Major Alexander James Farrall
- Warrant Officer Class 1 Tracy Anne Freer, VR
- Major William Peter Hodgson
- Captain Thomas William Hulme
- Warrant Officer Class 1 Adam Johnston
- Warrant Officer Class 2 Stephen Alan Jones
- Lieutenant Colonel Bharat Sunil Kara
- Major David James Love
- Lieutenant Colonel James David Lyon
- Major Jonathan Matthew Marsay
- Warrant Officer Class 1 Donald Scott Cameron McGregor
- Sergeant Christopher John Morgan
- Major Amelia Anne Morrissey
- Major Martin James Murphy
- Staff Sergeant Emmanuel Oppong
- Lieutenant John William Pickering
- Major Andrew Victor Poulton
- Major James William Reaney
- Major Marcus Alexander Rokeby Roberts
- Captain Richard Michael St John Sheehan
- Warrant Officer Class 1 Colin Peter James Giblin Sinclair
- Major Luke William Turrell, JP
- Major Tom Paterson Watson
- Major William Welsh
- Corporal Ceiron Alexander Williams
- Lieutenant Colonel Stephen Wilson
- Major Paul William Young
- Corporal Emile-Josiah Bangura
- Squadron Leader Charles Benjamin Marr Emmerson
- Warrant Officer Craig Hamilton
- Sergeant Gareth Lloyd Jones
- Flying Officer David Colin McCrae
- Flight Lieutenant Raj Kiran Mehta
- Flight Lieutenant Marcus William Norman
- Squadron Leader Joseph Robert Rushton
- Squadron Leader Thomas Anthony Smith
- Squadron Leader Mark David Sugden
- Squadron Leader David James Taudevin
- Squadron Leader James Kevin Wilyman

Civil

- The Reverend Pater Martin Abrams. Hospital Chaplain and Spiritual Care and Chaplaincy Manager, Mersey and West Lancashire Teaching Hospitals NHS Trust. For services to the community in Merseyside and West Lancashire.
- Farhan Adam. Headteacher, Crown Hills Community College, Leicester. For services to Education.
- Karen Frances Addington. Chief Executive, Breakthrough T1D. For services to People with Type 1 Diabetes.
- Helen Elizabeth Addis. Founder, Change and Check. For services to Cancer Awareness and to Charitable Fundraising.
- Beverley Adey-Morgan. Lead Business Analyst, Department for Work and Pensions. For services to People Affected by Dementia.
- Bukola Adisa. Head of Digital X Controls and Transformation, NatWest. For services to Diversity and Financial Services.
- Ashleigh Ainsley. Co-Founder, Colorintech. For services to Diversity and Inclusion in Technology.
- Hazel Patricia Ainsworth. For services to Fundraising.
- Norman Marshall Allen. For services to Education in Portadown, County Armagh.
- Steven John Amor. Lately Watch Manager, Mid and West Wales Fire and Rescue Service. For services to the community in Mid Wales.
- Adjoa Aiboom Helen Andoh. Actor. For services to Drama.
- Dr. Paul Stewart Andrew. Chair, Young Asian Voices. For services to Charity and Young People in Sunderland and the North East.
- Professor Frances Elizabeth Andrews. Professor, School of History, University of St Andrews. For services to Higher Education.
- Philip Edward Frederick Andrews. Archaeologist. For services to Community Engagement in Archaeology.
- Gregory James Archer. Deputy County Commissioner and Deputy Lead Volunteer, Greater Manchester West Scout County. For services to Young People.
- Professor Sharon Arkell. Dean of the Faculty of Education, Health and Wellbeing, University of Wolverhampton. For services to Higher Education.
- Joanna Fiona Armitage (Fiona Movley). Chair and Trustee, Harrogate International Festivals. For services to Charity.
- Gillian Arnold, JP, DL. Magistrate and Founder, Yorkshire Champions Group. For services to the Administration of Justice, to Education, and to the community in West Yorkshire.
- Bhishma Fredua Agyeman Kiren Asare. Founder, Rap Therapy. For services to Education and Mental Health Awareness.
- The Right Honourable Viscount Ashbrook. For services to Charity and the community in Cheshire.
- Iain Keith Ashcroft. Operations Officer, North Wales Mountain Rescue Association. For services to Mountain Rescue.
- Rebecca Denise Ashcroft. Chair, North East Wales Search and Rescue. For services to Mountain Rescue.
- Dennis Ernest Ashton. Founder, Stardome. For services to Astronomy Education and to Charity.
- Ann Elizabeth Atkinson Sharp. Opera Singer and Artistic Director, North Wales International Festival. For services to Music.
- Estelle Bailey. Chief Executive, Berkshire, Buckinghamshire and Oxford Wildlife Trust. For services to Nature's Recovery.
- Vanessa Pauline Barden. For services to Animal Welfare.
- Simon Alistair Bareham. Lately Senior Specialist Adviser, Radioactivity and Industry Policy. For services to the Protection of Air Quality and Biodiversity in Wales.
- Anita Ruby Barnard. Foster Carer, East Riding of Yorkshire Council. For services to Foster Care.
- Danielle Barnett. For services to People with Disabilities and their Carers in Lancashire.
- Stephen John Barnett. Director of Care Homes, The Royal British Legion. For services to Veterans.
- Carly Eileen Barrett. Co-Founder, Samantha's Legacy. For services to the Prevention of Knife Crime.
- Nicholas James Barrett. Lately Chief Executive Officer, The Outward Bound Trust. For services to Outdoor Education.
- Nicola Bartlett. Officer, National Crime Agency, For services to Law Enforcement.
- James Matthew Batchelor. Chief Executive Officer, Alertacall. For services to Technology for Older People.
- Nigel John Bates. Engineering Manager, Ratcliffe Power Station, Uniper UK Limited. For services to the Electricity Generation Industry.
- William John Bee. Lately Chair, Local Travel Group, Disabled Persons Transport Advisory Committee. For services to Transport Accessibility.
- Linda Belgrove. Founder and Chair, Essex Retired Police Dogs Fund. For services to Charity.
- Julie Bell. Head of Cultural Services, Lancashire County Council. For services to Public Libraries.
- Peter Richard Bill. Neurophysiology Head of Service and Consultant Clinical Scientist, Birmingham Women 's and Children NHS Foundation Trust. For services to Neurophysiology and Physiological Science.
- Mark Stephen Bills. Lately Director, Gainsborough's House. For services to Art, to Museums and to the community in Suffolk.
- Howard Bines. Senior Policy Lead for Careers, Department for Education. For services to Further Education.
- Andria Birch. Chief Executive Officer, Bassetlaw Community and Voluntary Service and Chair, Worksop Together. For services to the community in Bassetlaw.
- Lynn Blagg. Lately Leader, SureStart Centre, Middlesbrough. For services to Early Years.
- Neil Booth. For services to Lawn Bowls.
- Alex Robert Boucher. Founder and Managing Director, Analog. For services to the Gaming Industry and to Entrepreneurship.
- James Robert Bowen-Dawes. Founder and Director, Dawes Highway Safety and Specialist Advisor for Corporate and Social Responsibility, British Concrete Transport Association. For services to Road Safety.
- Dr. Ian Bowler. Chair and Clinical Lead, Medserve Wales. For services to National PreHospital Emergency Medicine.
- Reverend Canon Samuel Robert Thomas Boyd. Rector, Glendermott Parish, Diocese of Derry and Raphoe. For services to the community in County Tyrone and County Londonderry.
- Tracey Bright. Lately Deputy Chief Executive, Age UK. For services to Older People.
- Lavinia Beth Rose Britton. Campaigner. For services to People with Dementia and to their Carers.
- Paul Bromwell. Founder, Valley Veterans. For services to Veterans and to Vulnerable People.
- Elaine Margaret Brown. Schools Outreach, University of West of England. For services to Education and to Cyber Security.
- Richard Brown. Inspector, Police Service of Northern Ireland. For Public Service.
- Eric Brownlie. Lately Assistant Principal, Curriculum and Quality Enhancement, Glasgow Clyde College. For services to Further Education in Scotland.
- Merleta Bryan. Founder, Black Achievers Award. For services to the Black Community of Nottingham and the East Midlands.
- Margaret Moir Wells Bryan (Margarette Bryan). Retail Consultant. For services to the Retail Sector in Scotland.
- Dr. Alistair William Bryce-Clegg. Consultant, Trainer and Author, Early Years, International and Co-Founder, My First Five Years, UK. For services to Early Years.
- Helen Jane Budge. Lately Director, Children's Services, Shetland Islands Council. For services to Education.
- Catherine Jean Burke. Lately Head, Musculoskeletal Services Occupational Health and Wellbeing, Police Service of Northern Ireland. For services to Health and Wellbeing.
- Noreen Burroughes. President, Organisation for Women in International Trade UK. For services to Women in International Trade and to Entrepreneurship.
- Peter Hugh Burroughs. Lately Trustee and Chair, Exeter Royal Academy for Deaf Education. For services to Education.
- Anwen Butten. For services to Lawn Bowls, to Cancer Care and to the community in Wales.
- Anne Cadman. Administrator, ScotSTAR, Scottish Ambulance Service. For services to Healthcare in Remote and Rural Areas.
- Gillian Margaret Caine. For services to Scouting, to Dewsbury Young Diabetics and to the community in Kirklees, West Yorkshire.
- Jack Adrian Caine. UK Lead Volunteer for People, Scouts UK. For services to Young People.
- John Rodger Cairns. Founder, Western Dales Bus. For services to Public Transport.
- Fiona Campbell. Chief Executive, Association of Scotland's Self-Caterers. For services to Scottish Tourism.
- Maxine Campbell-Downer. Campaigner and Senior Project Manager, Kinship. For services to Kinship Care and to Advocating for and Supporting Families.
- Dr. John Bernard Carlisle. Consultant Anaesthetist, Torbay and South Devon NHS Foundation Trust. For services to Medicine and Patient Care.
- Professor Andrew Jonathan Carr. Nuffield Professor of Orthopaedic Surgery, University of Oxford. For services to Orthopaedic Research and Training.
- Mary Margaret Carroll, JP. Founder Member, Bradford Courts Chaplaincy Service and Magistrate Supplemental List. For services to Court Users and HM Courts and Tribunals Service.
- Charlotte Clair Carter, JP. Magistrate, East Hampshire Bench and Independent Monitoring Board Member, HM Prison Isle of Wight. For services to the Administration of Justice in the Isle of Wight and Hampshire.
- Robert Carter. Lately Deputy Chief Executive, OnSide. For services to Young People.
- David Charles Case. Chair, Diss Heritage Triangle Project. For services to the community in Diss, Norfolk.
- Harry Catherall. Chief Executive, Oldham Council, and Interim Chief Executive, Tameside Council. For Public Service.
- Anthony John Nicholas Chalmers. Assistant Director, Department for Education. For services to Education and Skills.
- Peter Chan. Founder and Managing Director, Herons Bonsai. For services to Business, Entrepreneurship and to Bonsai.
- Surdarshan Singh Chana. Indian Classical Musician. For services to Music and Sikh Culture.
- Anne Marguerite Chapman, BEM. Co-Founder, The Ladies' Tractor Road Run. For services to Fundraising for Cancer Research UK.
- John Richard Chapman. Co-Founder, The Ladies' Tractor Road Run. For services to Fundraising for Cancer Research UK.
- Charlotte Jane Charles. Campaigner. For services to Road Safety.
- Mark Ian Henry Chatterton. For services to the community in Farnborough, Hampshire.
- Jennifer Anne Chaundy. For services to the community in Bampton, Oxfordshire.
- Maurice Christopher Kai-Yau Cheng. Chief Executive, Institute of Osteopathy. For services to Osteopathy.
- Professor Robert Peter Chilcott. Emeritus Professor of Toxicology, University of Hertfordshire. For services to National Security.
- Carmela Chillery-Watson. Fundraiser, Muscular Dystrophy UK. For services to Charitable Fundraising for Muscular Dystrophy UK to Support its Work for the Disabled Community.
- Ben Chisanga. Social Worker, Redcar and Cleveland Borough Council. For services to Unaccompanied Asylum-Seeking Children.
- Matthew Clare. For services to the community in Saffron Walden, Essex.
- Maureen Clark. For services to Netball in Surrey.
- Laura Helen Clarke. Headteacher, Rowan Gate Primary School, Wellingborough. For services to Special Educational Needs.
- Paul Cocoran. Fundraiser, The Rifles Regimental Association. For services to The Rifles Charities and to Veterans.
- Anthony Neil Cole. Chair, South West London Conservatives. For Political and Public Service.
- Shane John Gerard Connolly. For services to Sustainable Floristry.
- Wendy Cook. Director, The Nephrotic Syndrome Trust. For services to People with Nephrotic Syndrome.
- Melanie Louise Cooper. Armed Forces Champion, Department for Work and Pensions. For services to the Armed Forces in Kent.
- Ian Ernest Corner. Patron, Muscular Dystrophy UK. For services to People with Muscular Dystrophy.
- Graham Alexander Corton. District Explorer Scout Leader, MidHerts Scouts. For services to Young People.
- Lady (Kathryn Mary) Cotton. For Charitable Service.
- Winifred Elizabeth Jill Coulter-Sloan. For services to Disability Sport.
- Kevin Savio Marc Coutinho. Chair of Trustees, Windsor Fellowship. For services to Equality, Diversity and Inclusion.
- Dr. Paul Lesley Cowan. Reader in Education, School of Education, University of the West of Scotland, Founder and Director, Vision Schools Scotland. For services to Holocaust Education and Remembrance.
- Montague Cowan. Volunteer, Association of Jewish ExServicemen and Women. For services to the Jewish Community and to the community in Giffnock, Glasgow.
- Hugh Gordon Crabtree. Director, Farmex Limited. For services to the Pig Industry.
- Richard Cracknell. Lately Head of Social and General Statistics, House of Commons. For services to Parliament.
- Dr. Peter John Cranfield. Dentist, Training Programme Director and Associate Postgraduate Dean, NHS England. For services to Dental Education.
- Jacqueline Crawford. For services to the community in Goole, East Yorkshire.
- Anthony Richard Croucher. For services to Heritage.
- Samuel Crowe. For services to the community in County Antrim.
- Joanne Currie. Principal, Cairnshill Integrated Primary School. For services to Education and to the community in South Belfast.
- Hafsha Dadabhai-Shaikh. Director, Smartlyte – Get Families Talking. For services to Digital Inclusion.
- James Dalgleish. Inspector, Clyde Marine Unit, Ministry of Defence Police. For services to Defence Policing.
- John Neil Dalton. Chair, East Sutherland Rescue Association. For services to the community in East Sutherland.
- Roberta Dalton. Principal, Head of Historical Institutional Abuse Implementation Branch, The Executive Office, Northern Ireland Civil Service. For services to Victims and Survivors of Historical Institutional Abuse in Northern Ireland.
- Paula Mary Daly. Mission Area Officer for Southwest Scotland, Royal National Mission to Deep Sea Fishermen. For services to Fishermen and their Families.
- Rachel Daly. For services to Association Football.
- Tess Daly. For services to Broadcasting.
- Tamsin Daniel. Convenor, Bord Ertach Kernow. For services to Heritage, Cornish Distinctiveness and to the community in Cornwall.
- Tracy Ann Darke. Director of Planning and Building Control, Westminster City Council. For services to Town Planning.
- Scott Darraugh. Founder and Chief Executive, Social adVentures. For services to Social Enterprise and the community in Salford, Greater Manchester.
- Karyle Davidge-Stringer. Service Manager, Rushmoor Citizens Advice. For services to the community in Hampshire.
- Christopher Norman Davies. For services to Running and to Health and Wellbeing.
- John Ian Davies. Associate Professor of Biomedical Science Practice, University of Staffordshire. For services to the NHS Diagnostic Pathology Service and to Biomedical Science Education.
- Robert Gregory Davies. Governor, Bank View High School, Merseyside. For services to Children and Adults with Special Educational Needs.
- Stephen Robert Davies, BEM. Co-Founder, Team UnLimbited. For services to People with Disabilities and to Charitable Fundraising.
- Steven Michael Davies. Professional Cricketer. For services to Sport.
- Ruth Davison. Officer, National Crime Agency. For services to Law Enforcement.
- Julie Dawes. Chief Nurse and Deputy Chief Executive, Hampshire Hospitals NHS Foundation Trust. For services to Nursing and the NHS.
- Adam David Dawson. For services to Charitable Fundraising and to the Jewish Community.
- Rhys Deas. Lead IT Product Manager, HM Revenue and Customs. For Public Service.
- Dr. Marcel De Matas. Lately Chair, Bury Football Club. For services to Association Football.
- Umeshkumar Desai. For services to Higher Education.
- Zamiha Desai. Founder, RecommendAsian and Founder, ProfessionalAsian. For services to the British Asian Community.
- Elizabeth Julia de Thierrey. Founder and Chair, Trauma Recovery Centre. For services to Child and Adolescent Mental Health and Trauma Recovery.
- Neelam Devesher. Chair, Community Foundation for Surrey and Chair, Surrey Minority Ethnic Forum. For services to Charity and to the community in Surrey.
- Gabriella Di Laccio. Soprano and Founder, Donne Foundation. For services to Music and to Gender Equality.
- Angela Christine Dixon. Chief Executive Officer, Saffron Hall. For services to Music Education and the Performing Arts.
- Kylie Dixon. Founder, Northern Lass Lounge. For services to Social Enterprise and Female Entrepreneurship.
- Anthea Margaret Donaghue. Lately Chair, Pregnancy Counselling and Care Scotland. For services to Pregnancy Support in Edinburgh.
- Jennifer Donnan. Hospice Palliative Care Nurse. For services to Palliative Care in Northern Ireland.
- Dr. Elizabeth Jean Donnelly. Lead Nurse Tissue Viability Nurse Specialist, Belfast Health and Social Care Trust. For services to Nursing and Health and Social Care.
- John Walker Dreczkowski. Volunteer, Eilidh Brown Respite Home. For services to Charity.
- Catherine Drew. Deputy Head Teacher, Frank Barnes School for Deaf Children. For services to Education.
- Professor Louise Dubras. Foundation Dean, School of Medicine, Ulster University. For services to General Practice and Medical Education.
- Karen Duggan. Trustee and Treasurer, Lewisham Irish Community Centre. For services to Early Years.
- Pamela Duncan-Glancy, MSP. Member of the Scottish Parliament for the Glasgow Region. For Political and Public Service.
- Michael Dunlop. For services to Motor Cycle Racing.
- Robert William Patrick Dunne. Volunteer Treasurer, Veterans' Housing Scotland. For services to Veterans.
- Victoria Spencer Dunnett. Chair, Board of Directors, Boghall Drop in Centre, Bathgate. For services to Vulnerable People in West Lothian.
- Marjorie Dutton. Lead Volunteer Akela, Dane Valley Scout Group. For services to Young People and the community in Congleton, Cheshire.
- Neil Howard Dutton. Group Scout Leader, Dane Valley Scout Group and Chair, Congleton Scout and Guide Liaison Committee. For services to Young People and the community in Congleton, Cheshire.
- Dawn Lousie Edwards. Managing Director, Challenge Training and Consultancy Ltd. For services to the Business Community in Nottinghamshire.
- Peter George Edwards. Chair, Ashfield Health and Wellbeing Partnership. For services to the Economy and the community in Ashfield, Nottinghamshire.
- Professor Bridget Mary Eickhoff, FREng. Principal Infrastructure Engineer, Rail Safety and Standards Board. For services to Railway Engineering.
- Paul Simon Ellison. For services to the community in Rochdale, Greater Manchester.
- Sophie Anne Epstone. Founder and Chief Executive, Trekstock. For services to Young Adults Living With Cancer.
- Jacqueline Falkner. Director of Operations, Sky News. For services to Broadcasting.
- Daniel Thomas Fell. Chief Executive, Doncaster Chamber of Commerce. For services to Business and the Economy in South Yorkshire.
- Anne Teresa Fenton. Home Manager, Birmingham Children's Trust. For services to Children with Disabilities and their Families.
- Lee Fisher. Artistic Director, Freefall Dance Company. For services to Dance and to the Learning-Disabled Community.
- Professor Peter Raymond Flatt. Professor of Biomedical Sciences and Head of Diabetes Research, Ulster University. For services to Diabetes Research.
- Professor Lyndsay Fletcher, FRSE. Professor of Astrophysics, University of Glasgow. For services to Solar Physics and to Diversity and Inclusion in Physics and Astronomy.
- Peter Flinn. For services to Engineering.
- Hazel Fothergill. Police Staff, Executive Assistant, Merseyside Police. For services to Policing.
- Ruth Fox. Founder, Footprints. For services to the community in Redcar.
- Christina Franks. Deputy Head and Manager, Acorns Nursery and Forest School, West Sussex. For services to Early Years and Childcare.
- Dr. Anne Bernadette Mary Friel. Lately Head of Pharmacy and Medicines Management, Western Trust. For services to Pharmacy in Northern Ireland.
- Amanda Jayne Furniss. Witness Liaison Officer and Student Liaison Officer, HM Courts and Tribunals Service North East. For services to Witnesses.
- Sharief Gaafar. Senior Solution Architect, Siemens Mobility Ltd. For services to Innovation in Transport and to Diversity and Inclusion.
- Michael Gallagher. Policy Manager, Home Office. For Public Service.
- Yvonne Patricia Gallagher. Director, Digital Insights, National Audit Office. For services to Digital Transformation in Government.
- Dr. Matthew John Gaskell. Consultant Psychologist and Clinical Lead, NHS Northern Gambling Service. For services to People Experiencing Gambling Harm.
- Cristina George. Vice Chair of Governors, Kirklees College, West Yorkshire. For services to Further Education.
- Geoffrey George. Senior Rough Sleeper Navigator, London Borough of Merton. For services to Relieving Homelessness.
- Jennifer Bryony Gibson. For services to the community in Northumberland.
- James Randolf Gibson Fleming, DL. For services to Charitable Causes and to the community in Dorset.
- Colonel Nigel Ernest Longmore Gilbert. Chair, The Royal Army Service Corps and Royal Corps of Transport Association. For services to Veterans.
- Jennifer Gill. Founder, LoveOliver. For services to Families Affected by Childhood Cancer.
- Claire Louise Gilmore. Head of Service, Early Start Prevention and Sufficiency, Barnsley Metropolitan Borough Council. For services to Children, Young People and to the community in Barnsley.
- Martin John Glasspool. Senior Project Adviser, Government Office for Science. For services to Science in Government.
- Dr. Jennifer Gold. Executive Director of Research, Economic and Social Research Council. For services to Evidence-based Policy Making.
- Manfred Goldberg, BEM. Holocaust Survivor and Educator. For services to Holocaust Remembrance and Education.
- Grahama Goldup. Lately Senior Assistant Headteacher, Cardinal Newman Catholic School, Hove, and Geography Continuing Professional Development Co-Ordinator, The Prince's Teaching Institute. For services to Education.
- Graham Keith Gouldman. Songwriter and Musician. For services to Music.
- Sybille Anne Graham. Technical Lead, HM Revenue and Customs. For Public Service.
- Russell Stuart Granville. Fellow, Amcor Flexibles. For services to Packaging and Environmental Responsibility.
- Sue Graves. Children's Author. For services to Children with Special Educational Needs.
- Janet Green. For services to Alder Hey Children 's Kidney Fund in Merseyside.
- Dr. Linda Helene Greenwall, BEM. Dentist, Linda Greenwall and Associates and Founder, Dental Wellness Trust. For services to Dentistry and to Charity.
- Mary Claire Greenwell. Makeup Artist and Ambassador, British Beauty Council. For services to the Beauty and Fashion Industries and to Charity.
- Kenneth Evan Griffiths. Volunteer. For services to the community in Haslemere, Surrey.
- Timothy Brian Gwilliam. Councillor, Forest of Dean District Council. For services to the community in the Forest of Dean.
- Dr. Philip John Hadley. Lately International Market Development Director, Agriculture and Horticulture Development Board. For services to International Trade in Agriculture.
- Carolyne Ruth Hague. Principal Adult Occupational Therapist, Devon County Council and Chair, National Principal Occupational Therapist Network. For services to Occupational Therapy in Adult Social Care.
- Jo-Anne Halliday. Chief Executive Officer, Talking Medicines. For services to the Economy and to Medical Innovation.
- Hilary Ruth Halter. Care Home Volunteer. For services to Vulnerable People.
- James Haluch. Managing Director, Breedon Group. For services to Improving Safety for Highway Workers.
- Jennifer Catherine Hamilton-Woodthorpe. Lead Sponsor London Underground Major Projects, Transport for London. For services to Transport Planning and Accessibility.
- Camilla Susan Hampshire. Lately Museum Manager and Cultural Lead, Royal Albert Memorial Museum and Art Gallery. For services to Culture in Exeter.
- Rachel Sharon Hancocks. Founder, Your Space. For services to Autism in North Wales.
- Ingrid Aileen Hannaway. For services to the Duke of Edinburgh's Award Scheme in Northern Ireland.
- Janet Mary Harding. Lately Special Educational Needs CoOrdinator, Hamstead Junior School, Birmingham. For services to Education.
- Russell Stephen Mons Hardy. Chair, Foundation Group. For services to the NHS and to Charity.
- Claire Constance Harnden. Deputy Chief Executive Officer, South Farnham Educational Trust. For services to Education.
- Louise Margaret Harris. Co-Founder and Chief Executive Officer, Tramshed Tech. For services to Digital Entrepreneurship.
- Dominic Stephen Harrison. Chair, Audit, Risk and Development Committee and Trustee, GamCare. For services to the Prevention of Gambling Harms.
- Georgia Louise Harrison. Campaigner. For services to Tackling Online Privacy and Cyber Crime Awareness.
- Andrew Francis Harston. Regional Director, Associated British Ports. For services to Ports.
- Giles Simeon Hartill. Chief Technologist, Atomic Weapons Establishment. For services to Engineering.
- Mark Andrew Hartley. Officer in Charge, Eastern Sovereign Base Area, Sovereign Base Areas Customs and Immigration, Ministry of Defence. For services to Law Enforcement and to the Sovereign Base Area Community.
- Riazul Hassan. Head of Anti-Racist Wales Action Plan, Welsh Government. For services to Community Relations and the Vision of a Racism-free Wales.
- James Graham Hatchley. Lately Deputy Chair and Senior Independent Director, Great Ormond Street Hospital for Children NHS Foundation Trust. For services to Fundraising in the NHS.
- John Martin Hayes. Founder, The Axis Foundation. For Charitable Services.
- Deborah Janes Haynes. Head of Dorset Civil Contingencies Unit, Dorset and Wiltshire Fire and Rescue Service. For services to the Resilience Community.
- Nicholas Hayward. Volunteer Station Mechanic and Deputy Launching Authority, Lymington Lifeboat Station, Royal National Lifeboat Institution. For voluntary services to Maritime Safety.
- Mark Richard Heath. Lately Returning Officer, Southampton City Council. For Public Service.
- Katrine Heathcote. Commercial Director and Co-Owner, Witherbys. For services to the People of Scotland.
- Bryan David Henderson. Director of Cricket and NFL, Sky. For services to Cricket.
- Dr. Karen Henderson. Director of Research and Innovation, University of Reading. For services to Higher Education.
- Julian Mark Hetherington. Automotive Transformation Director, Advanced Propulsion Centre. For services to Business Investment and Growth.
- James Desmond Hill. Lately Clerk, County Londonderry Lieutenancy. For services to the community in County Londonderry.
- Dr. Justin Charles David Hill. Lately Chief Executive Officer, YMCA St Helens. For services to the community in Merseyside.
- Mark David Hobin. Police Constable, Merseyside Police. For services to Policing.
- Claire Louise Hopkins. For services to Food Waste Prevention and Food Provision.
- Frederick John Hudson. For services to the Arsenal Football Club Community.
- Professor Graham Robert Vivian Hughes. Founder, Graham Hughes International Charity. For services to Lupus and Hughes Syndrome Patients.
- Luke Humphries. For services to Darts.
- Sally Joy Hunston. Director of Strategy, The Gallery Trust. For services to Education.
- Muhbeen Hussain. For Political Services to Integration, Cohesion and to British Society.
- Amina Hussein. Operations Manager, International Family Tracing, British Red Cross. For services to the Red Cross.
- Dr. Catherine Barbara Hutchinson. Consultant Nurse, Beatson West of Scotland Cancer Centre. For services to Cancer Nursing.
- Eleanor Grace Hutton. Manager, Explorosity Education, Lincolnshire. For services to Early Years Provision.
- Richard Ikin. Founder, Young Farmer Development Award. For services to Farming, Agriculture and Industry.
- Richard Philip Izard. Chair, World Vision UK. For services to Charity.
- John Robert Jackson. Lately National Care and Health Improvement Adviser for Finance, Partners in Care and Health. For services to Adult Social Care.
- Peter Andrew Jackson. Technician, Ratcliffe Power Station, Uniper UK Ltd. For services to the Electricity Generation Industry.
- Richard Jeremy Jackson. Founder President, The Greenfingers Charity. For services to Children's Hospices.
- Jonathan Jacobs. For services to Mental Health.
- Amy Hannah james. Intelligence Manager, Home Office. For services to the Protection of Vulnerable People.
- Nicola Jaques. Chair, Lived Experience Council, GambleAware. For services to the Prevention of Gambling Harms.
- Sharon Elizabeth Jarrett. Headteacher, Amersham School, Buckinghamshire. For services to Education.
- Professor Noor ul Owase Jeelani. Professor of Paediatric Neurosurgery, Great Ormond Street Hospital for Children NHS Foundation Trust. For services to Neurosurgery and Global Child Health.
- Pravin Ravji Kara Jethwa. Delivery Officer, Regions Group London, Department for Education. For services to Education.
- Carole Johnson. Police Staff, Central Authority Bureau Manager, Durham Constabulary. For services to Policing.
- Patricia Mary Johnson. For services to Women 's Golf.
- Natasha Paula Jonas. For services to Boxing and to the community in Liverpool.
- Joanne Judith Jones. Lately Headteacher, Story Wood School, Birmingham. For services to Education.
- Sally Grace Jones. Chair, Northamptonshire Carers. For services to Carers.
- Susanna Jones. Patron and lately Chief Executive, Swindon Carers Centre. For services to Unpaid Carers.
- Julius Joseph. For services to Basketball.
- Lucy Katan. Founder, British Grooms Association. For services to Sport.
- Sujan Katuwal. For services to the community in the Royal Borough of Greenwich.
- Professor David Martin Keene. Chief Executive, Aurrigo. For services to Decarbonisation at Airports.
- Oliver Benjamin Kemp. Chief Executive, Prostate Cancer Research. For services to Prostate Cancer Research.
- William Frederick Kennard. Music Artist and Founder, East London Arts and Music. For services to Music and to Creative Arts Education.
- Elaine Sorca Kennedy. Chair, Board of Governors, Fivemiletown College. For services to Education in Northern Ireland.
- Jane Kenyon. Founder, Girls Out Loud. For services to Gender Equality for Women and Girls.
- Douglas Kerr. Founder, Solway Aviation Museum. For services to Aviation Heritage.
- Sarah Louise Kerr. Private Secretary to the Convenor of Crossbench Peers, House of Lords. For services to Parliament.
- Fazilette Sultana Khan. Founder Trustee, Greenseas Trust. For services to Marine Conservation.
- Muzahid Uddin Khan, DL. For services to Charity and to the community in Oldham.
- Dr. Keith James Kirby. Honorary Visiting Researcher, Department of Biology, University of Oxford. For services to Ecology, Forestry and Woodland Management.
- Malcolm John Kirby. Volunteer, Red Dot Radio. For services to Hospitals in Edinburgh.
- Alison Margaret Knight. Advanced Customer Support Senior Leader, Department for Work and Pensions. For Public Service.
- Mohan Singh Kundi. Chair, Sefton Carers Centre. For services to Charity.
- Dr. Maria Stephenson Lacey. For services to the Arts in Northern Ireland.
- Roy Stanley Lakey. Lately Regional Officer, Labour Party. For Political Service.
- Saffron Fern Lane. Lately Captain, Great Britain Women's Ice Hockey Team. For services to Sport.
- Andrew David Lapthorne. For services to Tennis.
- Lynn Laughland. Chief Executive, HRM Homecare Services. For services to Improving Care Services.
- Graham Craig Law. Development Engineer, Celtic Magic, and Volunteer and Secretary, REMAP. For services to the Design and Production of Bespoke Technological Solutions for the Disabled Community.
- David Valentine Lawrence. For services to Cricket.
- Camille Anna Leavold-Todd. Chief Executive, Abbots Care Ltd. For services to Homecare.
- Graham Lee. Chair, Statfold Narrow Gauge Museum Trust Ltd. For services to Heritage Railway Preservation and to Charity.
- Troi Minh Hong Lee. Founder, Deaf Rave. For services to the Arts and the D/deaf Community.
- Dr. Christine Lingard. Lately Headteacher, Ravenscliffe High School, West Yorkshire. For services to Children and Young People with Special Educational Needs.
- Luke Littler. For services to Darts.
- Dr Vicki Bryony Livesey (Vicki Bryony Worswick). Director, UK Research and Innovation. For services to Industrial Decarbonisation, Carbon Capture and Storage and Net Zero.
- Daniel Lopez. Member, City of London Corporation Competitiveness Advisory Board. For services to Trade Promotion and to the City of London.
- Sarah Elizabeth Ann Lowe. Senior Research Officer, Welsh Government. For services to Data Research.
- Brian Ludlow. Officer, National Crime Agency. For services to Law Enforcement.
- Audrey Ludwig. Founder, Suffolk Law Centre. For services to Legal Aid in Suffolk.
- Simon James Lusty. Lately Publications Manager, Driver and Vehicle Standards Agency. For services to Road Safety.
- Jane Barbara Lyons. Lately Chief Executive, Cancer 52. For services to People with Cancer.
- Marjory MacFarlane. Trustee and Deputy Chair, The National Heritage Memorial Fund and Chair, National Lottery Heritage Fund Scotland Committee. For services to Heritage.
- Captain Alistair Young Mackenzie. Chair, Port of Aberdeen. For services to the Maritime Sector and to Charity.
- Kenneth Macangus Mackenzie. Chief Executive Officer, Target Fund Managers. For services to the Care Home Sector and to Improving the Lives of Older People.
- Charles Macleod. Training Officer, Assynt Mountain Rescue Team. For Voluntary Service in Scotland.
- Donald John MacSween. For services to the community in the Western Isles.
- Alison Madgin. Co-Founder, Samantha's Legacy. For services to the Prevention of Knife Crime.
- Coline Magee. Co-Founder, Leicestershire and Rutland Youth Sailing Association. For services to Young People and to People with Disabilities.
- Zahrah Mahmood. President, Ramblers Scotland. For Voluntary Service in Scotland.
- Amy Charlotte Manning. Lately Managing Director, S12 Solutions. For services to Mental Health.
- Sarah Mansbridge. Gallery Director, Cornwall Contemporary. For services to Art.
- James Paul Manwaring. Director of Music, The Windsor Boys School. For services to Education.
- Gordon Marsden. Lately Member of Parliament for Blackpool South. For Political and Public Service.
- Ruth Alexandra Marshall. Head of Futures Capability, Government Office for Science. For services to Evidence-based Policy Making and Innovation.
- Fiona Geraldine Martin. Founder, The Friends of Alfie Martin Charity. For services to Fundraising in Leeds.
- Simon Martin. Vice Principal, Academy Transformation Trust Further Education, Nottinghamshire. For services to Further Education.
- Margaret Petrina Mathieson. Staff Officer, Department of Finance, Northern Ireland Civil Service. For voluntary services to Athletics in Northern Ireland.
- Sophie Emma-Louise Maxwell. Founder and Director, The Really NEET Project. For services to Young People.
- Pamela McCormick. Director, UD Music, London. For services to Music Education.
- Terence McCourt. Fundraiser, Parachute Regimental Association. For services to Veterans in Scotland.
- Keith McDevitt. Cyber Resilience Team Leader, Scottish Government. For services to Cyber Resilience in Scotland.
- Paul James McGee. Principal Child and Family Social Worker, and Head, Essex Social Care Academy. For services to Social Care.
- James Anthony McGinn. Managing Director, Hastings Hotels. For services to Hospitality and Tourism in Northern Ireland.
- William McHugh, DL. Heritage and Culture Transformation Lead, Doncaster Council. For services to Local Government, Heritage and to the community in South Yorkshire.
- Margaret Anne McManus. Fundraiser. For services to the Deafblind Community in Northern Ireland.
- Ram Kishan Mehmi. Councillor for Pleck, Walsall and Trustee, Darlaston Temple. For services to Faith and Integration.
- Marion Kathryn Mehta. Interim Branch Director, Samaritans of Redbridge. For services to the Samaritans and Suicide Prevention.
- Susan Jane Campbell Melrose (Susan Foard). Procurator Fiscal, Crown Office and Procurator Fiscal Service. For services to the Administration of Justice and to the community in Orkney.
- Brett Ilan Mendell. For services to Sustainability and to Leadership.
- David Ekin Millar. For services to Business and to the community in Northern Ireland.
- David Cameron Mitchell. Executive Headmaster, Dunoon Grammar School, Argyll and Bute. For services to Education.
- Tina Anita Mitchell Skinner. Founder and Lately Chief Executive, Brain Tumour Support. For services to People Affected by Brain Tumours.
- Alistair Murray Moffat. Founder of Borders Book, Lennoxlove Book Festivals and Kelso Arts Festival. For services to Literature and Culture.
- Allison Moise-Dixon. Headteacher, St Bernard's High School, Essex. For services to Education.
- Gerida Montague-Munson. Executive Headteacher, Learning Federation Partnership of Schools, Southampton. For services to Education.
- Professor Calvin Ray Moorley. Professor for Diversity and Social Justice, School of Nursing and Midwifery, London South Bank University. For services to Academia, Nursing and Nurse Education.
- Claire Louise Morris. Senior Nursing Workforce Lead, NHS England. For services to the Nursing Workforce.
- Dr. Roger Lloyd Morris. Lately General Practitioner, Cardiff and Vale University Health Board. For services to Healthcare, to Charity and to the community in Cardiff.
- Fiona Elizabeth Morrison. Outreach Officer, Blesma, The Limbless Veterans. For services to Veterans and their Families in Northern Ireland.
- Donald Morrow. Head of Dairy, Pigs, Poultry and Crops Branch, College of Agriculture, Food and Rural Enterprise, Department for Agriculture, Environment and Rural Affairs. For services to the Agriculture Industry and to Scouting in Northern Ireland.
- Gareth Brian Moss. Chair of Trustees, John Taylor Multi-Academy Trust. For services to Education.
- Angela Helen Mountain. Founder and Director, Sunshine Community Nursery, Little Rascals Private Day Nurseries, and Giggles Day Nurseries, Leeds. For services to Early Years.
- Grace Muir. Founder and Chief Executive Officer, Homing Ex-Racehorses Organisation Scheme. For services to Charity, to Animal Welfare and to Education.
- Michael Joseph Mulholland. Deputy Principal, Historical Institutional Abuse Implementation Branch, The Executive Office, Northern Ireland Civil Service. For services to Victims and Survivors of Historical Institutional Abuse in Northern Ireland.
- Mary Mumvuri. Chief Nursing Officer and Deputy Chief Executive Officer, Coventry and Warwickshire Partnership NHS Trust. For services to Mental Health, Learning Disabilities and Autism.
- Kathryn Mary Murphy. Director of Nursing and Midwifery, Manchester University NHS Foundation Trust. For services to Midwifery Leadership.
- Drew Murray. Co-Founder, Team UnLimbited. For services to People with Disabilities and to Charitable Fundraising.
- Muhammad Abdul Musabbir. Chair, Hyde Bangladesh Welfare Association. For services to Community Cohesion.
- Leon Myers. Headteacher, Swinemoor Primary School, East Riding of Yorkshire. For services to Education.
- Dr. David Gordon Naylor. For services to People with Disabilities in Bradford and Calderdale, West Yorkshire.
- Gary Anthony Nicolas. For services to Emergency Search and Rescue Service and to Adults with Special Needs and Disabilities in Northern Ireland.
- Timothy Martin Noad. Designer. For services to Calligraphy, Heraldry and Design.
- Luljeta Nuzi. Founder and Chief Executive Officer, Shpresa Programme. For services to the Albanian Community.
- Professor Donna-Jean Corrigan O'Boyle. Professional Adviser to the Chief Nursing Officer's Directorate, Scottish Government. For services to Improving Patient Safety.
- Rory Petter O'Connor. Charity Director, Royal Air Forces Association. For services to the Royal Air Force.
- Professor Rachel Kerry O'Reilly, FRS. Pro-Vice-Chancellor (Research), University of Birmingham. For services to Chemistry.
- Martin James O'Vastar. District Civil Engineer, Forestry England. For services to Forestry.
- Julie Lynn Oakley. For services to Youth Mental Health and to the community in South Gloucestershire.
- Tracy-Ann Oberman. Actor and Playwright. For services to Holocaust Education and Combating Antisemitism.
- Dr. Modupeola Obilanade. Principal General Practitioner, St Paul's Clinic, Newport. For services to the community in Newport, Wales.
- Albino Ochero Okello. National Caseworker, International Family Tracing, British Red Cross. For services to the Red Cross.
- Nichola Jane Page. Chief Human Resources Officer, Police Service of Scotland. For services to Policing, to Equality, and to Health.
- Professor Susan Elizabeth Page. Professor of Physical Geography, University of Leicester. For services to Peatland and Climate Research.
- Janet Ann Parker. Chair of Girl Experience, Girlguiding South West England. For services to Young People.
- Lee Parkinson. Education Consultant and Primary School Teacher, Davyhulme Primary School, Manchester. For services to Education.
- Wayne Ian Parmel. Co-Founder, ACE Dance and Music. For services to the Arts.
- Crispin Parry. Chief Executive, British Underground. For services to the Arts, Music and the Creative Industries.
- Michael Charles Parry. Head of Analysis, TARIAN Regional Organised Crime Unit, South Wales Police. For services to Policing.
- Christine Ann Pascall. Lately President, England Golf. For services to Golf.
- Parimalkumar Bhanuprasad Patel. Paralegal Officer, Crown Prosecution Service. For services to Law and Order.
- Sanjay Mahendra Patel. Lately Managing Director, The Hundred. For services to Cricket.
- Sat Paul. For services to the community in Bedford, Bedfordshire.
- Kevin Peach. Chief Executive Officer and Harbourmaster, Ullapool Harbour Trust. For services to the Economy and to the community in Ullapool.
- Professor Emeritus Alan Christopher Perkins. Honorary Fellow, Royal College of Physicians. For services to Patient Care and Clinical Science.
- Dr. Glen Peters. Eco Entrepreneur. For services to Green Energy and Eco Housing.
- Reverend James Mark Pitkin. National Chaplain, RAF Air Cadets. For services to Young People.
- Jennifer Pogue. Principal, Arellian Nursery School, Belfast. For services to Early Years Education.
- Dr. Marie Jean Polley. Co-Founder and Lately Co-Chair, Social Prescribing Network. For services to Social Prescribing.
- Victoria Poole. Lately Deputy Chief Inspector, Care Inspectorate Wales, Welsh Government. For Public Service to Social Care.
- Jeffrey Charles Pope. Writer, Director and Producer. For services to Drama.
- Louise Telford Potter, DL. Advisor, Buxton Vision and Volunteer and Trustee, Buxton International Festival. For services to the Economic Development of Buxton, Derbyshire.
- Ian John Potts. District Commissioner, South West Cheshire Scouts and Group Scout Leader, 26th South West Cheshire Scouts. For services to Young People.
- Meryl Denise Praill. For services to the community in Newbury, Berkshire.
- Professor Raman Kant Prinja. Professor of Astrophysics, Department of Physics and Astronomy, University College London. For services to Academia and Education.
- Pier-Maxine Pritchard. Lately Social Work Senior Manager, Wiltshire Council. For services to Children and Family Social Care.
- Susan Ann Raven. Principal, The Centre School, Cambridgeshire. For services to Children with Social, Emotional and Mental Health Needs.
- Dr. Helen Jane Read. Conservation Officer, City of London Corporation. For services to Conservation and to Arboriculture.
- Sheelagh Redpath. Lately Technical Officials Co-Ordinator for Netball, Commonwealth Games. For services to Netball.
- Lynda Redshaw. Executive Assistant, Northern Housing Consortium. For services to Social Housing in the North of England.
- Claire Render. Chief Executive Officer, The Good Shepherd Multi Academy Trust, Cumbria. For services to Education.
- Stephen Frazer Rhodes. For services to the Environment and to Emergency Response.
- Dr. Dave Rich. Director of Policy, Community Security Trust. For services to Tackling Antisemitism, Hate Crime and Extremism.
- Andrew James Richardson. Chair, Food and Drink Wales Board. For services to the Food and Drink Sector.
- Dr. Heather Anne Richardson. Lately Director of Academic Learning and Action and Chief Executive Officer, St Christopher 's Hospice. For services to Nursing and Palliative Care.
- Arthur Roberts. Lately Chair, Community Foundations for Lancashire and Merseyside and Trustee, Community Foundation for Lancashire. For services to the community in Lancashire and Merseyside.
- Carolyn Roberts. Lately Headteacher, Thomas Tallis School, Royal Borough of Greenwich. For services to Education.
- Paul Anthony Robertson. Senior VAT Manager, Scottish Government. For Public Service.
- William George Robinson. Liaison Officer, Ministry of Defence. For services to Defence.
- Andrew Phillip Rodgers. Volunteer Coxswain, Bridlington Lifeboat Station and Regional Technical Lead, North and East, Royal National Lifeboat Institution. For services to Maritime Safety.
- Dr. Alastair John Roeves. Lately National Clinical Lead for Primary Care and Community Services for Wales, NHS Wales Executive. For services to Healthcare.
- Melvyn Westley Roffe. Lately School Principal, George Watson's College, Edinburgh. For services to Education and to the community in Edinburgh.
- Angela Mary Rook. Associate Director, Fundraising, Marketing and Media, Royal National Lifeboat Institution. For services to the Royal National Lifeboat Institution.
- Stewart Ross. Deputy Chief Operating Officer, University of Leeds. For services to Sport.
- Wendy Elizabeth Ross. Lead Practitioner and Child Protection Co-Ordinator, St Christopher's PreSchool, Southampton. For services to Early Years.
- Suzanne Josephine Rowand, BEM. Personal Assistant, HM Treasury. For Public Service.
- Joanna Rzymowska. Lately Vice President and Managing Director, Celebrity Cruises. For services to Diversity and Inclusion in the Travel Industry.
- Sonia Sabri. Dance Artist. For services to Dance.
- Ann Salt. Scout Leader. For services to Young People in Salford, Greater Manchester.
- Dr. Tracey Fiona Sandom. Lately Chair, British Association of Dental Therapists. For services to Dental Therapy and to the NHS in Wales.
- Geoffrey Sansome. Lately Head of Agriculture, Natural England. For services to Farming and the Voluntary Sector.
- Sean Sapstead. Lately Principal of Cyber Detect and Respond, NHS England. For services to Cyber Security.
- Andrea Louise Scott. Border Force Senior Officer, Home Office. For services to Border Security.
- John Trevor Scott. Lately Chair, South East Wales Branch, Soldiers', Sailors' and Airmen's Families Association. For services to Veterans.
- Fleur Joanna Sexton, DL. For services to the community in Coventry, West Midlands.
- Catherine Sezen. Director of Education Policy, Association of Colleges, London. For services to Further Education.
- Shahbaz Hussain Shah. Firefighter, Lancashire Fire and Rescue Service. For services to the community in Lancashire.
- Monaser Shahzad (Mona Shah). Founder and Managing Director, Harry Specters. For services to Training and Employment for Young People with Autism.
- Kathryn Helen Shane. Managing Director, Blackpool Tourism Ltd. For services to the Visitor Economy and to the community in Blackpool.
- Aruna Kumari Sharma. Lately Headteacher, Villiers High School, London. For services to Education.
- Alvin Shaw. Reading Helper and Tutor. For services to Education.
- Timothy Adam Shaw. Co-Founder, Hospital Rooms. For services to Art.
- Anna Lindsay Shiel. Chief Investment Officer, Better Society Capital. For services to Social Enterprise.
- Kelvin Eusabio Shorte. Deputy Director, Individual and Small Business Compliance, HM Revenue and Customs. For Public Service.
- Laura Jane Silverman. Creator and Head, London School of Economics and Political Science Generate. For services to Social Innovation and Education.
- Christopher James Simmons. Lately Chair, Ad Astra Academy Trust, County Durham. For services to Education.
- Dr. Richa Sinha. Chair, The Scottish Hindu Foundation. For services to the Hindu Community in Scotland and to Tackling Hinduphobia.
- Stephanie Jane Slater. Founder and Chief Executive Officer, School Food Matters and Co-Chair, School Food Alliance. For services to Young People.
- June Elizabeth Slaughter. Ward Councillor, Sidcup, London Borough of Bexley. For Political and Public Service.
- Agnes Celestine Slocombe. Community Leader, Barnet African Caribbean Association. For services to the community in the London Borough of Barnet.
- Andrew Smith. Head of Regional Governance and Local Government North, Labour Party. For Political and Public Service.
- Elizabeth Anne Smith. For services to the community in County Tyrone.
- Sarah Elizabeth Smith. Birmingham Diocesan Director of Education and Chair, Birmingham Diocesan Multi-Academy Trust. For services to Education.
- Philippa Siân Spicer. National Director, The Oliver McGowan Mandatory Training, NHS England. For services to People with a Learning Disability and People with Autism.
- Carole Anita Spiers. For services to Mental Health and Stress Management in Greater London.
- Peter Clive Stanley. Senior Specialist Advisor on Abandoned Mines, Natural Resources Wales. For services to Geoscience and Metal Mines.
- Katharine Staples. For services to the Promotion of Sport and Fitness.
- Lesley Stephen. Patient Advocate, Make 2nds Count. For services to People with Secondary Breast Cancer and to Cancer Research.
- Dawne Melanie Stephenson, DL. Professional Standards Manager, London Fire Brigade. For services to the Fire and Rescue Service.
- Bridget Mary Stevens. Pioneer, Audio Description, Edinburgh. For services to the Arts.
- Julie Frances Stewart (Julie Pringle-Stewart). Chief Finance Officer and Chief Operating Officer, National Oceanography Centre. For services to Ocean Science.
- Christine Margaret Still. For services to Gymnastics.
- Jane-Marie Stobie. Allied Health Professional. For services to People with Brain Injuries in Lanarkshire, Scotland.
- Rodney George Stone. For services to the community in Kingswood, South Gloucestershire.
- Maureen Storey. Lately Director, Vida Sheffield and Coordinator for Strategic Work, Sheffield Domestic Abuse Forum. For services to Survivors of Domestic Abuse.
- Philip Andrew Alfred Storr. Deputy Director, NHS Resilience, NHS England. For services to the NHS.
- Julia Barbara Taylor Streets. Founder and Chief Executive Officer, Streets Consulting. For services to Diversity and Inclusion in Entrepreneurship, particularly in the Financial Services and Technology Sectors.
- Professor Lindsay Carman Stringer. Professor of Environment and Development, University of York. For services to Environmental Development.
- Celia Joyce Suppiah. Founder and Lately Chief Executive, Parents 1st. For services to Families during Pregnancy to Early Childhood.
- Daniel Swift. Chief Executive and Artistic Director, Concrete Youth. For services to the Arts and to People with Disabilities.
- Elizabeth Swift. Casework Administration Manager, Crown Prosecution Service. For services to Law and Order.
- Brian James Swinbanks. Lately Director, Tobermory Harbour Association. For services to the Isle of Mull.
- Oliver James Sykes. Children's Author and Lead Artist and Producer, Stories of Care. For services to Access to the Arts for Underprivileged Young People.
- Professor Jaspal Singh Taggar. Head, Undergraduate Primary Care Education and Director, Primary Care Education Unit, University of Nottingham. For services to General Practice and General Practice Teaching.
- Professor Timothy David Taylor. Creator and Producer, Time Team. For services to Archaeology and Heritage.
- Anastasia Florence Tennant. Lately Senior Policy Adviser, Arts Council England. For services to Museums and Galleries.
- Colin Albert Thackery. For services to Charitable Fundraising and to the Armed Service Community.
- John Thirkettle. Police Staff, Mental Health Operations Manager, Humberside Police. For services to Policing.
- Mark Alan Thoburn. Clinical Lead Prosthetist, Blatchford Prosthetics UK, Defence Medical Rehabilitation Centre Stanford Hall. For services to Defence Healthcare.
- Clive Edward Thomas. Assistant Head of Estates Wales and the West Midlands, Defence Infrastructure Organisation. For services to Defence and to Reservist Troops.
- Nicolette Marie Thomas-Tapper. Radio Presenter. For services to Broadcasting and to the community in the West Midlands.
- Stephen John Thompsett. President, Chartered Institution of Water and Environmental Management. For services to Water Management, Education and the Environment.
- Deborah Thompson. Chair, Ivy Learning Trust. For services to Education.
- Captain John Joseph William Thornhill. National Parade Marshall, Royal British Legion. For services to the Ex-Service Community and to National Events.
- Roderick David Thorpe. Lately Director, Sports Development Centre, Loughborough University, and Founding Member, Loughborough Sporting Club. For services to Physical Education and Sports.
- Richard Donald Titchener. Chief Executive Officer, Sea-Change Sailing Trust and Captain, Blue Mermaid. For services to Disadvantaged Young People and to the community in Essex.
- Shaun Edward Tobin. Race Director, Richard Burton 10K. For services to the community in Afan Valley, West Glamorgan.
- Mark Todd. Chief Executive Officer, Ocean Youth Trust South and Chair, Association of Sail Training Organisations. For services to Sailing and to Young People.
- Lisa-Marie Tonelli. Founder and Festival Director, North East International Film Festival. For services to Film and Charity.
- Angus John Tulloch. Founder Trustee, Scottish Schools Pipes and Drums Trust. For services to Music.
- Matthew William Turner. Chief Executive Officer and Founder, Creative Pod. For services to Business and to Charity.
- Patricia Jane Tuttle. For services to Film.
- Vasim Ul-Haq. Vice Chair and Treasurer, Thames Reach Charity. For services to the Homeless in London.
- Shahid Ullah. Work Coach, Department for Work and Pensions. For Public and Charitable Service.
- George Ussher. For services to the Royal Scottish Pipe Band Association.
- Richard Stephen Vallis. For services to Theatre, to Sport and to People with a Disability.
- Moira McManus Vance. Correspondence Manager, Scotland Office. For Public Service.
- Anthony Alexander Vlasto. President, City of London Committee, Royal National Lifeboat Institution. For services to Maritime Law, to the Royal National Lifeboat Institution and to Maritime Charities.
- Debra Monica Waite. Head of Regulatory Improvement and Operations Chief of Staff, Building Safety Regulator. For services to Health and Housing.
- Sandeep Wales. Quality Improvement Advisor and CoChair, Together Network, North East Ambulance Service NHS Foundation Trust. For services to Supporting Ethnically Diverse Ambulance Staff.
- Alexander Christopher Walker. Lately Conservative Group Leader, Milton Keynes City Council. For Political Service.
- Christopher Brook Walker. Executive Director, Business and Operations, Royal Museums Greenwich. For services to Culture.
- Kirsten Fiona Walker. Director, Collections Care and Estates, Horniman Museum and Gardens. For services to Museums.
- Robert Walker. Neurodiversity Network Founder, Department for Environment, Food and Rural Affairs. For services to Neurodiversity.
- Dr. Stephen Wallace. Chair, Sherwood Observatory and Project Manager, Science Discovery Centre and Planetarium. For services to the community in Ashfield.
- Peter Sylvester Walsh. Lately Chief Executive, Action against Medical Accidents. For services to Patient Safety and Justice.
- Faith Margaret Ward. Chief Responsible Investment Officer, Brunel Pension Partnership. For services to Pensions and to the Environment.
- Annette Ware. Volunteer and Trustee, The Samaritans. For services to the Samaritans.
- Merleen Ann Watson. For services to the Deaf and Hearing Impaired Community in Worcestershire.
- Pauline Margaret Watson. Secretary, The Kinross-shire Volunteer Group and Rural Outreach Scheme. For services to the community in Kinrossshire.
- Trevor George Watson, JP, DL. For services to the community in Teesside and North Yorkshire.
- Dean Frederick Webster. Founder and lately Headteacher, Mercia School, South Yorkshire. For services to Education.
- John Robert Welch. Nurse Consultant, Critical Care and Critical Care Outreach, University College London Hospitals NHS Foundation Trust. For services to Nursing and to Patient Safety.
- Cheryl Julie Amanda Weyman. Chief Executive Officer, The Academies for Character and Excellence Trust, Devon. For services to Education.
- Ann Elizabeth Whittle. Disability Allies Lead, HM Courts and Tribunal Service. For services to Disability Inclusion in H.M. Courts and Tribunals Service and the Ministry of Justice.
- Dr. Amanda Wilcox. Pro Vice-Chancellor, York St John University. For services to Higher Education.
- John Paul Wilkinson. Director of Young People, Volunteer and Business Support, Marine Society and Sea Cadets. For services to Young People.
- Percival Ross Williams. Director, Redruth Revival CIC. For services to Heritage and to Culture in Cornwall.
- Paul Stephen Wilsher. Commercial Support, Department for Education. For services to Education.
- Jason Wilsher-Mills. Artist. For services to the Arts and Disability.
- Jeremy Richard Wilson. Founder and Chief Executive, The Lakeland Climbing Centres and Founder, The Lakeland Climbing Foundation. For services to Indoor Climbing.
- Richard Adrian Wiltshire. Trustee, Business Archives Council, Member, Crisis Management Team for Business Archives and Archivist, London Gay Symphony Orchestra. For services to Heritage.
- Claudia Winkleman. For services to Broadcasting.
- Stephen Lawrence Winwood. Musician and Songwriter. For services to Music.
- Cheryl Wise. For Public Service.
- Yvonne Joy Witter. Chair, Peak District Mosaic. For services to Access to Nature.
- Joanne Wood. Senior Digital Product Manager, HSBC Bank. For services to Financial Inclusion and Vulnerability in Digital Banking.
- Paula Woodman. Founder, Woodentots Montessori Nurseries, North London. For services to Early Years.
- Gamiel Ahmed Yafai. Founder and Chief Executive Officer, Diversity Marketplace. For services to Diversity and Inclusion.
- Brian Douglas Yates. For services to Consumer Protection.
- Catherine Yelf. Lately Chief Executive, Macular Society. For services to People Living with Macular Disease.
- Caroline Young. Wellbeing and Benefits Advisor, Lydcare. For services to the community in the Forest of Dean.

International

- Damian Adams. Lately President of the British Chamber of Commerce Singapore. For services to British Business interests in Singapore.
- Heather Armstrong. Director, Gambia Horse and Donkey Trust. For services to Animal Welfare and the Alleviation of Poverty in The Gambia.
- Stephen Ashworth. Regional Finance Director, British Council in the Americas. For services to UK/Americas Cultural relations.
- Stuart Bagshaw. Chairman, Love of the Game; lately Chairman, the British American Business Network, Chairman and Trustee, the Atlas Foundation Americas and Chairman, Play Rugby USA. For services to UK/US Business and Trade and to Charity.
- Lindsay Baker. Team Leader, Foreign, Commonwealth and Development Office. For services to British Foreign Policy.
- Gary Bennett. Founder, the Scottish Emergency Rescue Association. For services to Charity through the support to Fire Services Internationally.
- Dr. Benjamin Burt. Curator, Oceania Section, the British Museum. For services to UK/Solomon Islands relations.
- Nicola Buxton. Executive Director, Belize Bird Rescue. For services to Conservation, Education and Preservation of Bird Life in Belize.
- Dr. Peter Cooper. Retired Soil Scientist. For services to Science and Scientific Research, particularly Soil Health.
- Khalida Cox. Lately Commonwealth Heads of Government Meeting Operations Manager, British High Commission Apia, Samoa. For services to British Foreign Policy.
- James Dodds. Partner, KPMG Japan; Director, Refugees Empowerment International. For services to The British Community in Japan through Education, Business and Trade and to Charity.
- Professor Toby Dodge. Professor of International Relations, London School of Economics. For services to UK interests in Iraq.
- Stuart D'Souza. Chief Executive Officer, Arabian Enterprise Incubators. For services to UK Business and Trade in Saudi Arabia.
- Niall Fry. Team Leader, Global Health Security, Health and Security Department, Foreign, Commonwealth and Development Office. For services to International Development.
- Raj Ghose. Team Leader, Foreign, Commonwealth and Development Office. For services to British Foreign Policy.
- Annie Green. Co-Chair, Childline Gibraltar. For services to Vulnerable Children in Gibraltar.
- Jonathan Hamilton. Chief Executive Officer and Founder, Inspire Indonesia. For services to Sport for Youth Social Development in Indonesia.
- Dr. Jean Handscombe. Volunteer for the Historical, Archaeological, Archive and Museum Committee, the National Trust Montserrat. For services to the preservation of Cultural and Historical Records in Montserrat.
- Carol Hardman. Founding Director, Vipingo Village Fund Charity. For services to Education and Charity in Kenya.
- Joanne Healey. Executive Director, British American Business Council. For services to British business in the United States of America.
- Caroline Lamb. Founder and Chief Executive Officer, Christian Relief, Education, Skills & Sustainability (CRESS). For services to South Sudanese Refugees.
- Margaret Lloyd. Volunteer, Built Heritage Committee, Bermuda National Trust. For services to Architectural Heritage in Bermuda.
- Professor Mohamed Loutfi. President and Vice-Chancellor, The British University in Egypt. For services to Education in the United Kingdom and Egypt.
- Glenn Ludlow. Team Leader, Foreign, Commonwealth and Development Office. For services to National Security.
- Ainsley Mann. President Director, PT Swire Investments Indonesia; Scottish Government Trade and Investment Envoy to Indonesia. For services to Scottish, and other UK business interests in Indonesia.
- Terrence Martin. Founder, Wessex School, Concepcion Chile. For services to British Education in Chile.
- Kay McArdle. Lawyer; Founder and Director, Equal Justice Ltd. For services to Community Legal Access and Women’s Rights in Hong Kong.
- Lesley Mistry. Trustee and Lead Nurse, Healing Little Hearts Global Foundation. For services to the co-ordination of Heart Surgery for Children Internationally.
- Dr. Winston Moore. Chairman, the Anglo Bolivian Society. For services to the Bolivian Community in the United Kingdom, to UK/Bolivia Business and Trade and to Charity.
- Denise Murton. Chief Inspector, Zimbabwe National Society for the Prevention of Cruelty to Animals. For services to Animal Welfare in Zimbabwe.
- Matthew Osborne. Lately Head of the United Nation Cybercrime Convention Negotiations, Cyber Policy Department, Foreign, Commonwealth and Development Office. For services to British Foreign Policy.
- Susan Ozturk. Founder and Trustee, the Vera Thomson English School, Rakhine State, Myanmar. For services to Children’s Education and Healthcare in Myanmar.
- Joan Pollock. Founder and Chair, The Spiti Projects, Himachal Pradesh, India. For services to Health and Education for the people of the Spiti Valley, Himachal Pradesh, India.
- Lewis Porter. Senior Site Manager, FCDO Services. For services to National Security and Defence in the Falkland Islands.
- Michael Richards. Team Leader, Foreign, Commonwealth and Development Office. For services to National Security.
- Geoffrey Roberts. Battle of Arnhem Veteran. For services to the Commemoration of the Battle of Arnhem and to Charity.
- Martin Smith. Independent Analyst and Reporter; Trustee, Prospect Burma. For services to Development in Myanmar.
- Paul Taylor. Supervisor and Founding Partner, Unique Hotels Group. For services to UK/Estonia relations.
- Janet Varney. Lately Nurse; Volunteer, the Centre for the Rehabilitation of the Paralysed, Bangladesh; Trustee, Harbour Housing, United Kingdom. For services to Disabled and Disadvantaged people in Bangladesh and the United Kingdom.
- Roger Varney. Volunteer, Centre for the Rehabilitation of the Paralysed, Bangladesh and for Harbour Housing, United Kingdom. For services to Disabled and Disadvantaged people in Bangladesh and the United Kingdom.
- David Webb. Independent Investor and Corporate Transparency Campaigner; Founder, Webb-site. For services to Raising Standards of Corporate Economic Governance, particularly in Hong Kong.
- Professor Maurice Whitehead. Director of Heritage Collections and Research Fellow, Venerable English College, Rome. For services to the development of British Heritage in Rome, Italy.
- Garreth Wood. Co-Founder and Chairman, Kids Operating Room. For services to Health and Charity, particularly Surgery for Children internationally.
- Nicola Wood. Co-Founder and Trustee, Kids Operating Room. For services to Health and Charity, particularly Surgery for Children internationally.
- Michael Woollard. Team Leader, Foreign, Commonwealth and Development Office. For services to National Security.

=== British Empire Medal (BEM) ===
British Empire Medal ribbon

- Christy Acton. Founder and Chief Executive Officer, Standing Tall. For services to the Homeless in the West Midlands.
- Joseph William Adams. For services to Altrincham Football Club and to Charitable Fundraising.
- Dr. Muhammad Ahsan. Community Safety Officer, Essex County Fire and Rescue Service. For services to the community in Essex.
- Emmanuel Akpan-Inwang. Founder and Director, Lighthouse Pedagogy Trust. For services to Social Enterprise and Young People.
- Josephine Allen. Chief Executive, The Counselling and Family Centre. For services to Mental Health and to Charity.
- John Amphlet. Lately Chair, Kensington and Chelsea Support Group, Parkinson's UK. For services to people with Parkinson 's Disease.
- Junior Anderson. Police Constable, Youth Violence Intervention Team, Northamptonshire Police. For services to Policing and to the community in Northamptonshire.
- Gillian Tracey Andrews. Guide Leader and Trustee, Northwest Sheffield Division Girlguiding. For services to Young People.
- Holly Jo Aquilina. Employability and Skills Strategy Manager, East Sussex County Council. For services to Integrated Skills, Health and Employment.
- Lorraine Denise Armstrong. Administrative Officer, Labour Relations Agency. For services to Employment Relations in Northern Ireland.
- Vikki Ann Ashton. Group Leader, Stoke Poges Duke of Edinburgh Award. For services to Young People.
- Penelope Jane Aston. Founder and Director, GroOops. For services to Raising Awareness for Dyslexia and Mental Health.
- Kenneth Atigah. Social Worker, Islington Council. For services to Children and Families.
- Edna Auld. Founder and Director, Jambouree Choir. For services to Music.
- Kathleen Margaret Baird. For services to Girlguiding and to the community in Perth and Kinross.
- Patricia May Baker. For services to the community in Clacton-on-Sea, Essex.
- Donald Eric Bannister. Lately Chair, Volunteer Committee, Severn Valley Country Park. For services to the Environment in Shropshire.
- Debra Ann Batchelor. Fundraiser and Volunteer, The Margaret Haes Riding Centre. For services to People with Disabilities in Bury.
- Gary James Beckett. Conservation Officer, Bicester Garrison. For services to the Defence Estate and to Conservation.
- Toby Beckett. For services to the Deaf Community.
- Elaine Anne Bell. Managing Director, Sewing Belle. For services to The Stapleford High Street.
- Karen Blanchfield. Founder, Little Litter Warriors. For services to Environmental Education.
- Alan Borthwick. Artistic Director, Edinburgh Gilbert and Sullivan Society. For services to Music.
- Rosanne Margaret Bostock. Founder, OxClean. For services to the community in Oxford.
- Horace Nigel Boston. Registered Manager, Selig Court, Jewish Care. For services to Older People.
- Roger Bowdery. For services to the community in Streatham, London Borough of Lambeth.
- Lesley Kay Bradfield. Lately Director, TimeNorfolk. For services to People Suffering from Pregnancy Loss.
- Karen Jill Bradley. Lately Team Leader, Resilience Division, Scottish Government. For services to Resilience in Scotland.
- Stuart Bradshaw. Founding Trustee, Slow the Flow. For services to Flood Risk Reduction and Sustainable Land Management.
- Dr. George Peter Bramham. Acute Care Common Stem Doctor, Southport Hospital. For services to the community in Merseyside.
- Eric Alfred Brown. For services to the community in Romney Marsh, Kent.
- Luba Brown. Executive Officer, Department for Work and Pensions. For services to Ukrainian Refugees.
- Peter William Brown. Volunteer Coastguard Rescue Officer, HM Coastguard, Lifeboat Coxswain and Trainer, Hamble Independent Lifeboat. For services to Maritime Safety.
- Elisabeth Brownlees. Foster Carer, Birmingham Children's Trust. For services to Foster Care
- Gavin Brownlees. Foster Carer, Birmingham Children's Trust. For services to Foster Care.
- Kirsty Montgomery Buchanan. Foster Carer. For services to Young People in Argyll and Bute.
- Roderick David Buchanan. Foster Carer and lately Pipe Sergeant, Mid Argyll Pipe Band. For services to Young People in Argyll and Bute and to Piping.
- Nicola Mary Buckingham. Founder, Cooking4Charity and Fundraiser, The National Brain Appeal. For Charitable Services.
- Paul Michael Bunce. Membership Support Officer, Wiltshire, Royal British Legion. For services to Veterans.
- Kathryn Burgess. Founder, Cheshire Girls Football League. For services to Girls Football in Mid Cheshire.
- Beverley Pamela Burke. Chief Executive, Enfield Carers Centre. For services to Health and Social Care in the London Borough of Enfield.
- Sarah Anne Catherine Burt. Manager, Young Sussex Nursery. For services to Early Years.
- Maureen Anne Butler. For services to People with Disabilities, to Young People and to Charity.
- Andrew David Buttery. Volunteer, Staffordshire Fire and Rescue Service. For services to the community in Staffordshire.
- Kathleen Callan. For services to the community in Middlesbrough, North Yorkshire.
- Lois Calvert. Multiply Development Manager, North Yorkshire County Council. For services to Further Education.
- Henrietta Ann Cameron. Police Volunteer, Northamptonshire Police. For services to the community in Northamptonshire.
- Victoria Carter. Swimming Teacher. For services to Diversity in Swimming, to the LGBT+ Community and to Older People.
- Mary Claire Jennifer Cartwright. For services to the community in Springwell, Tyne and Wear.
- Jeremy Chandler. For services to the community in Reigate, Surrey.
- Gillian Anne Chappell. Lately Guide Leader, 1st Henley-on-Thames Girlguiding Unit. For services to Young People.
- Margaret Ann Chatham. For services to the community in Coventry, Warwickshire.
- Margaret Jane Chilestone. Group Lead Volunteer, 1st Red Lodge Scout Group. For services to Young People.
- Charlotte Rebecca Clark. Manager, Community Library. For services to Literacy and to the community in Reydon and Southwold.
- Elaine Margaret Clarke. Chair, Speyside Youth. For services to Young People in Speyside.
- Ryan Paul Clarke. For services to the community in Nottinghamshire.
- Trevor Clower. Founder and Director, Caring Roadshows. For services to Unpaid Carers in Nottinghamshire.
- Angela Cogbill. For services to Children with Special Educational Needs and Adults with Disabilities.
- Brian Cole. On-Call Firefighter, Hampshire and Isle of Wight Fire and Rescue Service. For services to the community in Bishops Waltham.
- Dolores Collins. Tutor, Croydon Adult Education Service. For services to Further Education.
- Dr. Katherine Helen Condon. For services to Charitable Fundraising.
- Stein Connelly. Lately Head of Transport Resilience, Transport Scotland. For services to Transport Resilience.
- Frank Cook. Trustee, Humberside Scouts. For services to Young People.
- Paul Raymond Cotgrove. Founder, Southend-on-Sea Film Festival and Founder, Horror-On-Sea Film Festival. For services to Film and British Film Heritage.
- Anne Mary Cowan. For services to the community in Manton, Rutland.
- Adam Nicholas Cox. Police Staff, Lead Intelligence Analyst, Metropolitan Police Service. For services to Policing.
- Christopher James Cox. Organiser and Fundraiser, Langport Centre Somerset, British Red Cross. For Voluntary Service.
- Sabrina Cresswell. Founder, Tasty Not Wasty. For services to the community in Cwmbran.
- Susan Margaret Crook. Founding Member, Dobcross Youth Band. For services to Music and to the community in Dobcross.
- Bryan Kenneth Cross. For services to the community in Surrey.
- David Harry Crowden. Fundraising Volunteer, The Royal National Lifeboat Institution. For voluntary services to Maritime Safety.
- Margaret Sheelin Cuthbert. For services to the community in North Norfolk.
- Marjory Clark D'Arcy. For services to Older People and to the community in Grampian.
- Colin Dalgarno. President, Strathaven Rugby Club, Chair, Whiteshawgate 3G Sports Trust and Volunteer. For services to the community in Strathhaven.
- Julian Simon Davenne. Play Services Manager, Torfaen County Council. For services to Young People.
- Christopher John Davies. Lately Chair of Trustees, Dorchester Youth and Community Centre. For services to Young People in Dorchester.
- Idwal Davies. Member, Llanelli and District Hospital Friends. For services to Veterans and to the community in Llanelli.
- Patricia Noreen Davis. For services to Charity, Hospices and Healthcare in Bristol.
- Margaret Jean Day. For services to the community in Kidlington, Oxfordshire.
- Robert Christian Deaville. Project Manager for the Cetacean Strandings Investigation Programme, Zoological Society of London. For services to Marine Species Conservation.
- Rebecca Lucy Denniff. Director, Flash Company Arts CIC. For services to Music Education.
- Paul Edward Dennington. Fundraiser, Prostate Cancer. For services to Fundraising for Prostate Cancer.
- James Colin Diggory. For services to the community in Nesscliffe, Shropshire.
- Frank Donoghue. Lately Locality Hub Team Leader, City of Edinburgh Council. For Public Service in Edinburgh.
- Thomas Douglas. Veterans Community Support Manager, Royal British Legion Scotland. For services to Veterans in Scotland.
- Teresa Duncan. For services to the community in Magherafelt, County Londonderry.
- Catherine Greer Duru. Special Educational Needs Co-ordinator and Cover Teacher, Tachbrook Nursery School, London. For services to Early Years and Children with Special Educational Needs.
- Geoffrey Edwards. For services to the community in Barnstaple.
- Angela Mary Ellis. Secretary, Crawley and Horsham Pony Club. For services to Children in West Sussex.
- Anthony Ellis. For services to the community in Hillingdon.
- John Frederick Escott. For services to Sporting Education.
- Cheryl Ferner-Reeves. Founder, New Horizons Theatre Company. For services to Young People and the community in North Finchley.
- Anna Fiorentini. Founder, Fiorentini Foundation and Anna Fiorentini Performing Arts School. For services to Young People from Under Privileged Backgrounds.
- Nigel Philip Ford. For services to Heritage and the community in Norfolk.
- Elizabeth Amy Fordham. For services to the community in Blakeney, Gloucestershire.
- Stephanie Jayne Forman. For services to the community in Dorchester on Thames, Oxfordshire.
- Phillip Michael Freeman. For services to the community in Dunchurch, Warwickshire.
- Nola Mavis French. For services to the community in Evercreech, Somerset.
- Margaret Anne Fuller. For services to the Royal Society of St George and the community in Gloucestershire.
- Linda Jane Gainey. Foster Carer, Wiltshire Council. For services to Foster Care.
- Sandra Alexandria Euphemia Galbraith. Volunteer. For services to the community in the Mearns.
- Avis Vanessa Gallager. Volunteer Coordinator, Cornhill Companions, Royal Voluntary Service. For services to the community in Banbury, Oxfordshire.
- Roger Garrett. For services to the community in Nottinghamshire.
- Andrew David Gee. Volunteer, Whoosh Explore Canoe Club. For services to Floating Pennywort Removal.
- Norma Geoghegan. Volunteer, Imperial War Museum North. For services to Heritage and the community in Manchester.
- Robert John Gibson. For services to the community in County Londonderry.
- James Glennie. Volunteer. For services to the Gordon Highlanders Museum and to the Royal British Legion.
- Dr. Christopher Alan Goddard. Consultant in Anaesthetics and Intensive Care, Mersey and West Lancashire Teaching Hospitals NHS Trust. For services to the community in Merseyside.
- Colin Grace. For services to Young People in Doncaster.
- Margaret Mullan Graham. Chair and Volunteer, Broxburn Family Centre. For services to the community in Broxburn.
- Linda Elizabeth Gray. For services to the community in Chirnside.
- Mabel Greaves. For services to Young Families in County Fermanagh.
- Kerrie Ann Green. Sergeant Major Instructor, Gwent and Powys Army Cadet Force. For services to the Army Cadet Force and to Young People.
- Kevin Frederick Green. Group Scout Leader and Training Adviser, 1st Shevington (Wigan) Scout Group. For services to Young People.
- Janice Greer. Volunteer, Royal Ulster Constabulary George Cross Foundation. For services to the Royal Ulster Constabulary George Cross Foundation.
- Michael Anthony Grimshaw. Watch Manager and On-Call Section Commander, Dorset and Wiltshire Fire and Rescue Service. For Public Service.
- Ram Prakash Gupta. For services to the community in Lancashire and Greater Manchester.
- Raymond Guy. Passenger Carrying Vehicle Driving Instructor, Arriva, North West and Wales. For services to Road Safety for Heavy Vehicles.
- Adrian George Chetwynd Habgood. Principal Forensic Evidence and Exhibits Officer, West Yorkshire Police. For services to Policing.
- Gary John Hackwell. Volunteer, Duke of Edinburgh Award and Treasurer, Medway Open Award Centre. For services to Young People and the community in Medway, Kent.
- Heather Hall. Lately Chief Executive Officer, The Inspired Community Enterprise Trust (The Usual Place). For services to the community in Dumfries and Galloway.
- Dr. Sheila May Halliday-Pegg. For services to the community in Bourne, Lincolnshire.
- James Edward Hamilton. Deacon of the Church of Scotland, Parish of Maryhill Ruchill, Glasgow. For services to the community in Maryhill and Ruchill.
- Kathleen Letitia Hamilton. Samaritan Volunteer and Lately Samaritans Lead HM Prisons High Down. For Public Service.
- Karyn Denise Hannaway. For services to Sport and to the community in Sefton.
- Alison Natalie Harle. Police Constable, City of London Police. For services to Policing.
- Stephen William Hart. Police Community Support Officer, South Yorkshire Police. For services to the Homeless and to Policing.
- Margaret Hartley. For services to the community in West Cumbria.
- Haydn Charles Hassard. For services to Older People in Northern Ireland.
- Richard Patrick Hayhow. Director, Open Theatre. For services to Young People with Learning Disabilities and Artists in Birmingham and Coventry.
- Eric Hepplewhite. For services to the community in Lanchester, County Durham.
- Louis William Hiatt. Watch Manager, North Wales Fire and Rescue Service. For services to the community in Aberdyfi and Tywyn.
- John Richard Hill. Volunteer Manager, Royal National Lifeboat Institution. For voluntary services to Maritime Safety.
- Peter Percy Homewood. Foster Carer, Bexley Fostering Service. For services to Foster Care.
- Rebekah Mary Homewood. Foster Carer, Bexley Fostering Service. For services to Foster Care.
- Andrew James Horner. Crew Manager, West Sussex Fire and Rescue Service. For Public Service.
- Daniel Horrocks. Members' Staff for Kingswinford and South Staffordshire and Brain Tumour Awareness Campaigner. For services to Parliament.
- Jane Horton. Finance Planning and Analysis Manager, British Transport Police. For services to Policing.
- Susanna Louise Howard. Founder, Living Words. For services to Charity, to Mental Health and to the Arts.
- Gillian Howie. Fundraiser. For services to the Royal Air Force Benevolent Fund and to Charity.
- Valerie May Hoyle. Secretary, Rotherham United Women Football Club. For services to Association Football and to the community in Rotherham.
- Dr. Dudley Charles Hubbard. For services to St John Ambulance.
- Alan Stephen Hubbuck. For services to Professional Forestry in Wales.
- Zoe Huggins. Chair, Lighthouse Learning Trust, Hampshire. For services to Education.
- Janet Humphrey. Police Staff, Suffolk Police. For services to the community in Suffolk.
- Keith Hurst. Volunteer, Frenford Clubs. For services to Young People and the community in Essex.
- Zarith Nasa Hussain. For services to Cricket.
- William Norman Wilson Irwin. For services to the community in Coleraine, County Londonderry.
- Lynn Christian Jamieson. Volunteer. For services to the community in Dingwall.
- Shirley Jamieson. Lately School Crossing Patrol Person, City of Edinburgh. For services to the Safety of Pedestrians in Juniper Green, Edinburgh.
- Malik Baboucar Jeng. Founding Director, Yaram Arts. For services to the Arts and Community Relations.
- The Reverend Brian Jennings. For services to the community in Walton-on-the-Naze.
- Keith Jensen. Paramedic, Scottish Ambulance Service. For services to Healthcare and to Charity.
- Sarah Ann John. Pre-School Manager, St Andrews Pre-School, West Sussex. For services to Early Years.
- Elanor Johnson. Lately Regeneration Officer, Churches Conservation Trust. For services to Heritage and the community in the North East.
- Glen Kelsall Johnson. For services to Heritage.
- Martin Johnson. Operating Department Practitioner, Mersey and West Lancashire Teaching Hospitals NHS Trust, Southport General Hospital. For services to the community in North West England.
- Roderick Peter Jones. For services to the community in Hexham.
- Rosalind Frances Barbara Jones. For services to the Victims of the Stavanger Air Disaster.
- Susan Jones. For services to People with Cerebral Palsy.
- Raymond Charles Jukes. For services to Education and Young People.
- Susan Kayser, JP. Magistrate, North West London Bench. For services to the Administration of Justice.
- Jacqueline Mary Keable. Lately Chief Executive, New Forest Disability Information Service. For services to people with Disabilities in the New Forest District.
- Peter David Kelly. For services to the community in Shoeburyness, Essex.
- Heather Kelso. Lately Leader, Kilrea Community Early Years Playgroup. For services to Early Years Education.
- Helen Keneally. Children Centre Manager, North Lincolnshire Council. For services to the community in Lincolnshire.
- Dr. John Bernard Keith Kerr. For services to the community in County Londonderry.
- Mujahid Khan. For services to the Development, Practice, and Teaching of Tang Soo Do.
- Adarsh Khullar. Founder and Chair, Scottish Asian Ekta Group. For services to the Scottish Asian Ekta Group.
- Julia Margaret Knight. Lieutenancy Officer. For services to the Somerset Lieutenancy.
- Richard Charles Knight. For services to Nature Conservation in Rhayader and Powys.
- Patrick Joseph Jeffrey Kowalenko. NHS and Care Volunteer Responder, Royal Voluntary Service. For Charitable Services.
- Dr. Prashant Jayantilal Ladva. Doctor, NHS and Chief Executive Officer, LinkMedics. For services to British Citizen Doctors Trained Overseas.
- Leila Abimbola Lawal. Chair, Aberfeldy Big Local. For services to the community in Tower Hamlets.
- Carl John Ledbury. Trustee, The Ambulance Staff Charity. For services to Ambulance Staff.
- Eileen Judith Lees. Community Volunteer, Bournmoor. For services to Education and to community in County Durham.
- Doris Frieda Levinson. Founder and Editor, Sussex Jewish News. For services to Jewish and Interfaith Charities and to the community in Sussex.
- Janette Audrey Lightfoot. Lately Teaching Assistant, Stewart Fleming Primary School, London. For services to Education.
- Russell George Ling. For services to the community in Otley.
- Nigel Robert Lister. Environment, Health, Safety, Security and Quality Director, Nuclear Waste Services. For services to the Nuclear Industry and to Mountain Rescue.
- Sean Jonathan Lock. Assistant Section Leader, Spixworth Scouts. For services to Young People.
- David Liston Lyle. Musical Director, Edinburgh Gilbert and Sullivan Society. For services to Music.
- Katie Lynch. Managing Director, Allexton Day Nursery, Leicestershire. For services to Children and Families.
- Anne Marie Rose Stella MacDougall. Volunteer. For services to the community in Clydebank.
- Kathryn Mackenzie. Lately Chair, Triangle Housing Association. For services to Social Housing in Northern Ireland.
- Christine Maddocks. Trustee, Alzheimer 's Society. For services to Advocacy and Awareness for Lewy Body Dementia and LGBTQ+ Dementia Communities.
- Winifred Ann Magowan. For services to the community in County Tyrone.
- Mary Hope Maidment. Volunteer Tour Guide and Steward, The Tate Gallery and The Foundling Museum. For services to Heritage.
- Professor Rebecca Louise Malby. Founder, Ilkley Clean River Group and Ilkley Pool and Lido Community Group. For services to National River Cleanliness and to the community in Ilkley, West Yorkshire.
- Jennifer Mallace. Founder, Bo 'ness Belles. For services to Charity.
- Richard Bruce Manning. Chair, United Joint Israel Appeal Programming Leeds. For services to the City of Leeds and to the Jewish Community.
- Margaret McPhillips Manson. Founder, Edinburgh Technician Network. For services to the Provision of Sciences in Education in Edinburgh.
- Susan Mary Mapp. Special Educational Needs and Disability Co-Educator, Cooks Spinney Primary Academy, Essex. For services to Special Educational Needs.
- Melanie Marnell. Ticket Office Officer, Greenwich Railway Station. For services to the Southeastern Railway.
- Julie Ann Matthews. For services to Mental Health in Somerset.
- Noel Maxwell. Driver, Northern Ireland Civil Service. For Public Service and Charitable Work in Northern Ireland.
- Dr. Peter Paul Mayer. Lately Public Governor, Birmingham Community Healthcare NHS Foundation Trust. For services to the NHS.
- Rita McCall. Organiser, Christmas Tree Festival, St Mary Magdalene Church, Newark. For services to the community in Newark.
- Meredith McCammond. Chartered Tax Adviser. For services to Vulnerable Groups.
- Lorraine Ann McCann. Management Side Officer, Education Authority. For services to Education and to Volunteering.
- Jeffrey William Joseph McClure. Lately Emergency Planning Officer, Northern Ireland Ambulance Service. For services to Emergency Planning.
- Wesley McDowell. Chaplain, Northern Ireland Prison Service. For services to Prisoners and their Families in Northern Ireland.
- John Robert McGlasson. Training Development Officer, No1 Radio School, Royal Air Force Cosford. For services to Defence and to Charitable Fundraising.
- Elizabeth Norah McGrath. Service Improvement Manager, Southern Health and Social Care Trust. For services to Suicide Prevention in Northern Ireland.
- Leanne McGuire. Founder and Chair, Glasgow City Parents Group. For services to Parental and Carer Engagement in Education.
- Christine Ruth McKeeman. Lately Unit Catering Supervisor, Straidbilly Primary School. For services to Education in Northern Ireland.
- James McLaren. For services to People with Disabilities and Older People in Clydebank and Glasgow.
- John Mark Meehan. Residential County Manager, Kent County Council. For services to Children and Young People with Special Educational Needs and Disabilities.
- David Nicholas Meredith. Chair, Albany Theatre Trust. For services to Theatre and to the community in Coventry.
- Maria Victoria Miller. Manager, Chipping Barnet Food Bank. For services to the community in Chipping Barnet.
- Ralph Robert Mills. Dresser, Royal National Theatre. For services to Theatre.
- Aruna Bipin Mistry. Laboratory Teacher, Science and Engineering, University of Birmingham. For services to Higher Education.
- Donna Lisa Mitchell. Senior Media Relations Manager, Network Rail. For services to Railway Safety for Young People.
- Michael Mitchell. Field Technical Support Engineer, Network Rail. For services to Young People Joining the Railway Industry.
- John Feroze Gareth Moos. For Charitable Service.
- Robert James Moran. Volunteer. For services to the community in Haddington, East Lothian.
- Karen Irene Morgan. National Lymphoedema Clinical and Education Lead for Wales, Swansea Bay University Health Board. For services to Lymphoedema Care.
- Muriel Beryl Morgan. Lately Volunteer Driver and Co-Ordinator, Royal Voluntary Service. For services to the community in Wrexham.
- Roberta Morrall. For services to the Arts in Nefyn, Wales.
- Jennifer Mary Mountstephens. Welfare Administrator, 14 Signal Regiment. For services to Service Personnel and the community in Brawdy.
- Lily Munday. Leader, Westbury Cadets, St John Ambulance. For Voluntary Service.
- Jayne Mushet. General Manager, Haven Holidays. For services to Hospitality, Travel and the Leisure Industries in the North West.
- Jeanette Mabel Nash. For services to the community in Melksham, Wiltshire.
- Michael Edwin Nash. For services to the community in Melksham, Wiltshire.
- Patricia Prudence Neal. Volunteer, Birmingham Athletic Institute Netball Club. For services to Grassroots Netball.
- Valerie Neal. For services to the community in Stonnall, Staffordshire.
- David Nicholls. Consultant Farrier, Liphook Equine Hospital. For services to Horse Welfare and Farriery.
- Judith Ann Elizabeth Nicholls. Founder and Director, Stage Struck. For services to Young People in Penzance, Cornwall.
- Gloria Brenda Nichols. For services to the community in Chelmsford, Essex.
- Marjorie Anne Nicholson. Artist and Director, Art Gene. For services to the Arts and to the community in Barrow in Furness.
- Mark Andrew Nicholson. For services to the community in the London Borough of Croydon.
- Paul Kinnersley Nixon. For services to Ukrainian Refugees.
- Marcus David Wallace Nutt. Hospital Volunteer, Western Health and Social Care Trust. For services to Volunteering in Northern Ireland.
- Dr. John Anthony O'Connor. Director, Angling Cymru. For services to Recreational Angling in Wales.
- Tracey O'Flaherty. For services to the community in Staffordshire.
- Hafsa Omar. Founder, Moss Side Eco Squad. For services to the community in Manchester.
- Sandra Wyn Owen. Director, Sandville Self Help Centre, Porthcawl. For services to Charity.
- Barbara Page. For services to Women in Cambridgeshire.
- Colin John Parker. Volunteer, Imperial War Museum North. For services to Heritage and the community in Manchester.
- Holly Parkin. For services to the community in West Dorset.
- Norman Parselle. Chief Executive Officer, County in the Community. For services to Sport and to the community in Newport, Wales.
- Elizabeth Helen Louise Parsons. Theatre Practitioner, Mersey West Lancashire NHS Trust, Southport General Hospital. For services to the community in Merseyside.
- Amish Dipakkumar Patel. Director, Hodgson Pharmacy. For services to Community Pharmacy.
- Pauline June Patrick (Polly Patrick). Advocacy Service Manager, Advocacy Northeast Ltd. For services to People Requiring Independent Advocacy in Aberdeenshire.
- Leslie Thomas Patterson. For services to the community in Northampton, Northamptonshire.
- David John Payne. For services to the community in West Bromwich, West Midlands.
- Catherine Elizabeth Pearson. For services to Sport and to the community in Durham and Tees Valley District.
- Damien Penman. Special Constable, Wiltshire Police. For services to Policing.
- Trevor Pepper. Regional Representative and Committee Member, National Pubwatch Scheme. For services to the Nighttime Economy and the Hospitality Industry.
- Beverley Phillips. Premises Manager, Goose Green Primary School, London. For services to Education.
- Emma Louise Phillips. Deputy Headteacher, Limpsfield Grange School, Surrey. For services to Education.
- Derek Alfred Picken. Chair, Rogerstone Welfare Cricket Club. For services to Cricket in South East Wales.
- David Geoffrey Pike. For services to the community in Swanage.
- Stuart Campbell Plaskett. Crew Manager, Cheshire Fire and Rescue Service. For services to Charity.
- Diane Lorraine Powles. Strategic Education Adviser, Health Education and Improvement Wales. For services to Nursing and to Education.
- Jane Charlotte Lee Poynder. Chair and Trustee, The Manor Park Club, Malvern. For services to Sport.
- Anne Margaret Campbell Prentis. For services to the community in Great Ryburgh, Norfolk.
- Susan Alexandra Price. Chief Coach, West Sussex Group and Suffolk County Chair, Riding for the Disabled. For services to People with Disabilities.
- Jessica Prosser. Early Years Learning Support Assistant, Tachbrook Nursery School, London. For services to Early Years.
- Squadron Leader Jonathan Robert Edward Pullen. For services to Military Charities.
- Francis Christopher Purcell. Managing Director, M&M Supplies plc. For services to Supporting Families and People with Disabilities and to the community in Milton Keynes.
- Ali Qadar. For services to the community in Sheffield, South Yorkshire.
- Dr. Steven Juan Quilliam. For Services to the community in Prudhoe, Northumberland.
- Seamus Eamonn Quilty. Councillor, Hertfordshire County Council and Hertsmere Borough Council. For services to Local Government.
- John Eric Rampling. For services to the community in Aylmerton and Holt, North Norfolk.
- Tara Rees. Advanced Nurse Practitioner, Cardiff and Vale University Health Board. For services to Nursing.
- Jonathan Richards. Emergency Response Volunteer, British Red Cross. For Voluntary Service.
- David Frank Richmond-Coggan. Water Safety Advisor and Chair, Christchurch and Bournemouth Fundraising Branch, Royal National Lifeboat Institution. For voluntary services to Maritime Safety.
- Lancelot William Robson. Lately Chair, North East Regional Conservatives. For Political and Public Service.
- Alison Elizabeth Ross. For services to Young People and the community in Rugby, Warwickshire.
- Benjamin Rosser. Founder and Chief Executive Officer, Pythian Youth Club. For services to Disadvantaged Young People in Nottingham.
- Susan Christina Russell. Service Delivery Co-Ordinator, Customer Experience and Service Delivery, House of Commons. For services to Parliament.
- Paul Ralph Salver. Holocaust Educator, Holocaust Education Trust, and Deputy Chair, Remembering Srebrenica Board for the East of England. For services to Holocaust Education and Genocide Awareness.
- Dr. Harvey Charles Reginald Sampson. Lately Director for Strategic Development, Symphony Healthcare Service. For services to General Practice.
- Derek Alan Savidge. For services to the community in Wollaton, Nottinghamshire.
- Michele Karen Scott. Lately Director, MusicSpace. For services to Music Therapy.
- Karen Denise Setchell. Lately Gardens Manager, Loughborough University. For services to Animal Welfare and to Sustainability.
- Santosh Sharma. Volunteer, Oxfam. For Charitable Service.
- Moira Helen Sinclair. Clinical Nurse Manager, Acute Services NHS Orkney. For services to the NHS in Orkney.
- Wendy Irene Skinner Smith. For services to Allotments in Oxford.
- David Charles Slade. Founder, Littlehampton Wave Life Saving Club and Chair and Lead Instructor, Royal Life Saving Society. For services to the community in Littlehampton, West Sussex.
- Pamela Hilda Sloan. For services to the community in Bodmin, North Cornwall.
- Paul Smith. Senior Paramedic Team Leader, North West Ambulance Service NHS Trust. For services to the community in Merseyside.
- Robert Stephen Smith. Chief Executive Officer, Group Recovery Aftercare Community Enterprise. For services to Charity and to the community in East Dunbartonshire.
- Terence Stewart Smith. For services to Music Development in Londonderry.
- Clara Smyth. For services to Fundraising in Northern Ireland.
- Joan Elizabeth Smyth. Administrative Officer, Police Service of Northern Ireland. For services to Policing.
- Paul William Snelling. Scout Leader, 1st Bures Scouting Group. For services to Young People.
- Caroline Jane Speirs. Co-Founder, Calum's Cabin. For services to Charitable Fundraising.
- Duncan Speirs. Co-Founder, Calum's Cabin. For services to Charitable Fundraising.
- Jenna Catherine Helen Speirs. Co-Founder, Calum's Cabin. For services to Charitable Fundraising.
- Peter Gerald Spencer. For services to the community in Bedhampton, Hampshire.
- Simona Stankovska. Founder, The Cavernoma Society. For services to People with Cavernoma.
- Catherine Anne Stanley. Chief Executive, Huntington's Disease Association. For services to People with Huntington's Disease.
- Heather Louise Stevens. Head Gardener, Museum of the Home. For services to Heritage and to Gardening.
- Jeffrey Ernest Stevens. For services to the community in Warwickshire.
- Jean Stewart. For services to Music in Lisburn, County Antrim.
- Neil Stockton. Chair, Oxford Hospital Radio Cherwell. For services to Hospital Radio and to the community in Oxford.
- William Sudworth. Organiser, Duke of Edinburgh Centre, St Mary's Bowdon Parish. For services to Young People and the community in Trafford, Greater Manchester.
- The Reverend Reginald Charles Sweet. For services to the Veteran Community in Gosport, Hampshire (to be dated 3 June 2025).
- Linda Georgina Taylor. Founder, Turnford Gymnastics Club. For services to Gymnastics and the community in East Hertfordshire.
- Keith Albert Taylor. For services to People with Multiple Sclerosis and Other Neurological Conditions.
- Frank Thomson. Musician, Royal Scottish Country Dance Society. For services to Music and Culture.
- Raymond George Elston Thornalley. For services to Bereaved Families in King's Lynn, Norfolk.
- Anne Andrea Kathleen Thorpe. Member and Advisor, Heathrow Access Advisory Group. For services to Accessibility at Airports for Disabled Travellers.
- Patricia Makepeace Trotter. Family Centre Manager, Nottinghamshire Local Authority. For services to Vulnerable Children and their Families.
- David Graham Turner. For services to the community in Chalgrove, Oxfordshire.
- Jason Tutin. Head, 100% Digital Leeds. For services to Digital Inclusion.
- Roger Anthony Valsler. Team Principal, City Racing. For services to Education in the Field of Engineering.
- Joan Mary Vaughan. For services to Older People and to the community in Conwy.
- Colin Robert Veysey. For services to the community in the Prestwood and Great Missenden Area.
- Nina Louisa Villa. Chair, Cheshunt Unit, Sea Cadets. For services to Young People.
- Lisa Marie Vint. For services to Mental Health Awareness and Suicide Prevention in Merseyside.
- Sarah Lorraine Voce. Organiser, Poppy Appeal, Burgess Hill. For services to the Royal British Legion and the community in Burgess Hill.
- Kevin Walsh. For services to the community in Carlisle, Cumbria.
- Colonel Clive Ward. Secretary, Hampshire Branch Soldiers', Sailors' and Airmen's Families Association. For services to Veterans.
- Brenda Warwick. Volunteer, St John Ambulance Wiltshire. For Voluntary Service to Community First Aid.
- Dr. Marrion Joy Watson. Volunteer. For services to People with Dementia in Salford.
- Trevor Watson. Part Time Constable, Police Service of Northern Ireland. For services to Policing.
- Judith Kate Weedon. For services to the community in Berrynarbor, Devonshire.
- Dwayne Michael Wells. Head of Commercial, Arriva Yorkshire. For services to the Bus Sector.
- Philip Wells. Assistant Chief Officer, Bedfordshire Police. For services to Policing.
- Lorraine Wildman. For services to the community in Clapham, North Yorkshire.
- Christopher David Williams. For services to the community in Anglesey.
- Wing Commander Richard Noel Williams. For services to the Veteran Community in Northern Ireland.
- Victoria May Williams. For services to the community in Anglesey.
- Clara Rachel Wilson. For services to Music in Northern Ireland.
- Emily Wilson. Volunteer, Alzheimer's Society and Chair, Dementia Friendly North Belfast. For services to People Living with Dementia in Northern Ireland.
- Fiona Mairi Wilton. For services to Tourism in Wales.
- Derek Charles Windybank. Community First Responder and Marketing Officer, West Leicestershire Community First Responder Group. For services to the community in West Leicestershire.
- Marcus Wolfgang-Hall. Scout Leader, 9th Chelsea and 10th/11th Chelsea Scout Groups. For services to Young People in Chelsea.
- Jacqueline Wood. Founding Member, Fine Cell Work Charity and Member, Guild of Faith, Westminster Abbey. For services to Charity.
- David Woodward. For services to the community in Odiham, Hampshire.
- Keith Andrew Woodward. For services to the community in Yateley, Hampshire.
- Laurie Patricia Woolfenden. For services to the community in Fed Ditton, Cambridgeshire.
- Nicholas Edward Weatherley Wright. Founding Trustee, The Steel Charitable Trust. For services to Charities and to the communities in Luton and Bedfordshire.
- Karen Wylie. Founder, Grub Club. For services to Ending Hunger in the community in Lochside.
- Sandra May Zamenzadeh. National Casework Manager, Department for Transport. For services to the National Transport Casework Service.

International

- John Berry. Co-Founder, Jack Berry Fijian Foundation. For services to Education in Fiji.
- Tina Berry. Co-Founder, Jack Berry Fijian Foundation. For services to Education in Fiji.
- Elizabeth Burrowes. Director of Music Education, Brass for Africa, Uganda. For services to Music Education for Disadvantaged Young People in Africa.
- Jack Nettleton Burrows. Lately Second Secretary Political, British Embassy Tel Aviv, Israel. For services to British Foreign Policy.
- Dr. Jennifer Chandler-Cooke. Lately Second Secretary Political, British Embassy Tel Aviv, Israel. For services to British Foreign Policy.
- Julie Cooper. Charity Fundraiser, the British Virgin Islands. For services to Charity Fundraising in the British Virgin Islands.
- Mark Cooper. Charity Fundraiser for Cancer Relief, Gibraltar. For services to Charity Fundraising in Gibraltar.
- Annabel Mitchell-Gears. Lately Political Consul, British Consulate General Jerusalem. For services to British Foreign Policy.
- Haytham Hamad. Vice Consul, British Consulate General Jeddah, Saudi Arabia. For services to British Nationals Overseas.
- Sharoon Lallmahomed. Corporate Services Manager, British High Commission Port Louis, Mauritius. For services to the British High Commission in Port Louis.
- Denis Lewis. Honorary Representative for the Kings African Rifles Veterans Trust (Malawi). For services to Veterans and their families in Malawi.
- Michael McCarthy. Lay Canon, lately Director of Music, Washington National Cathedral, United States of America. For services to Music and to UK/US relations.
- Angela McGrath. President, Cala Nova Cancer Care charity, Mallorca, Spain. For services to Charity Fundraising in Mallorca, Spain.
- Julian Murray. Vice Consul, British Consulate General Jerusalem. For services to British Nationals in the Occupied Palestinian Territories.
- Warren Robe. Lately Technical Works Supervisor, British Embassy Tehran. For services to the British Embassy in Tehran, Iran.
- Susan Routledge. Founder and Chair, Pitt Hopkins UK. For services to raising awareness of Pitt-Hopkins syndrome.
- Diane Swan. Co-Founder and Treasurer, The Meserani Project, Tanzania. For services to Young People and Communities in Tanzania and the United Kingdom.
- Peter Swan. Co-Founder and Chairman, The Meserani Project, Tanzania. For services to Young People and Communities in Tanzania and the United Kingdom.
- Hannah Turner. Teacher; Chairperson, Manama Theatre Club, Bahrain. For services to the promotion of British Culture and the Arts in Bahrain.
- Robert Williams. Chair and Co-Founder, Knights in White Lycra, Japan. For services to Charity Fundraising in Japan.
- Margaret Kimber-Zaharia. Founder, Little John’s House, Romania. For services to Children and Young Adults with Learning Difficulties and Disabilities in Romania.

=== Royal Red Cross ===
Royal Red Cross ribbon

==== Associate of the Royal Red Cross (ARRC) ====
- Warrant Officer Class 1 Ashley Grant Coull, Royal Army Medical Service
- Flight Sergeant Stephanie Louise Roberts

=== King's Police Medal (KPM) ===
King's Police Medal ribbon

England and Wales

- Kevin Baldwin. Lately Assistant Chief Constable, Essex Police.
- Margaret Blyth. Chief Constable, Gloucestershire Police.
- Justin Burt. Lately Detective Inspector, West Yorkshire Police.
- Carl Daniel Galvin. Assistant Chief Constable, West Yorkshire Police.
- Katherine Frances Goodwin. Detective Superintendent, Metropolitan Police Service.
- Dawn Jeffries. Detective Constable, Metropolitan Police Service.
- Heath Joseph Thomas Keogh. Constable, Metropolitan Police Service.
- Stuart Stephen King. Inspector, Avon and Somerset Police.
- Martin Levi. Lately Detective Inspector, Greater Manchester Police.
- John Donaldson Philip. Chief Officer Special Constabulary, Humberside Police.
- Samantha Ellen Ridding. Lately Detective Chief Superintendent, West Midlands Police.
- Timothy John Rogers. Sergeant, West Midlands Police.
- Paul David Sanford. Chief Constable, Norfolk Constabulary.
- Joanne Elizabeth Shiner. Chief Constable, Sussex Police.
- David Mark Thomason. Detective Sergeant, Cheshire Constabulary.
- Nigel Philip Walsh. Lately Detective Superintendent, West Midlands Police.
- Julia Anne Wellby. Lately Detective Sergeant, Metropolitan Police Service.

Northern Ireland

- Stephen George Dickson. Constable, Police Service of Northern Ireland.
- Thomas Johnston. Sergeant, Police Service of Northern Ireland.
- Dennis Kirk. Constable, Police Service of Northern Ireland.

Crown Dependencies

- Christopher Paul Beechey. Detective Chief Inspector, State of Jersey Police.

=== King's Fire Service Medal (KFSM) ===
King's Fire Service Medal ribbon

England and Wales

- Sonja Samantha Sinclair-Elechi. Payroll Officer, Welfare and CIST Manager, Hereford and Worcester Fire and Rescue Service.
- Patrick Wayne Goulborne. Assistant Commissioner, London Fire Brigade.
- Ian Marritt. Station Manager, Health, Safety and Environment and Organisational Learning, Humberside Fire and Rescue Service.

Crown Dependencies

- Jonathon Paul Le Page. Lately, Chief Fire Officer, States of Guernsey Fire and Rescue Service.

=== King's Ambulance Service Medal (KAM) ===
King's Ambulance Service Medal ribbon

England and Wales

- Laura Livall (Laura Charles). Operations Manager, Welsh Ambulance Service.
- Lee Umpleby. Senior Paramedic, East of England Ambulance Service.
- Jemima Katie Varela. Head of Clinical Operations, East of England Ambulance Service.

Northern Ireland

- Kieran Joseph Devine. Duty Manager, Emergency Operations Centre, Northern Ireland Ambulance Service.

=== King's Volunteer Reserves Medal (KVRM) ===
King's Volunteer Reserves Medal ribbon

- Warrant Officer 1 Logistician (Supply Chain) Samantha Martin, VR, Royal Naval Reserve
- Warrant Officer Class 2 Mark Vere Ebdon, VR, The Royal Welsh, Army Reserve
- Colonel Alexander John Grindlay Forbes, TD, VR, Army Reserve
- Warrant Officer Class 2 James Charles McMillen, VR, The Royal Logistic Corps, Army Reserve
- Colonel Andrew James Gerard Ryan, TD, VR, Army Reserve
- Warrant Officer Class 1 Nathan John Toms, VR, Corps of Royal Engineers, Army Reserve
- Sergeant Darren James Tyler

=== Distinguished Flying Cross (DFC) ===
Distinguished Flying Cross Medal ribbon

- Flight Lieutenant Jason Aaron Chadwick

=== Air Force Cross (AFC) ===
Air Force Cross Medal ribbon

- Squadron Leader Jonathan Mark Gerald Hawkins
- Flight Lieutenant Stephen Benjamin Watson

=== King's Gallantry Medal (KGM) ===
King's Gallantry Medal ribbon

- Leading Logistician (Catering Services) Dave Neala La Croix
- Petty Officer (Diver) Craig Antony Maddock

=== King's Commendation for Valuable Service ===
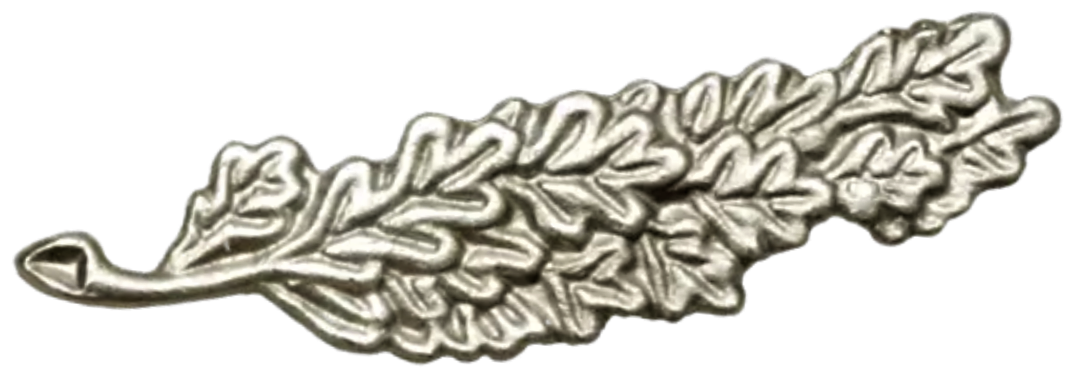
King's Commendation for Valuable Service device

- Warrant Officer Class 2 Engineering Technician (Marine Engineering) Michael John Barker
- Lieutenant Commander Matthew Peter Johnson
- Major Brent Stephen William Carter, Royal Army Medical Service
- Corporal Connor-James Derek Davidson, The Royal Regiment of Scotland
- Lieutenant Colonel Matthew Cameron Long, QGM, The Royal Logistic Corps
- Major Jonathan Grant Studwell, MBE, Intelligence Corps
- Major Paul Robert Wooster, Corps of Royal Electrical and Mechanical Engineers
- Flight Sergeant Jonathan Paul Graham
- Squadron Leader Garry Ross McKay
- Wing Commander Ieuan Donald Eddy Robinson
- Squadron Leader Benjamin Robert Michael Tripp

=== King's Commendation for Bravery ===
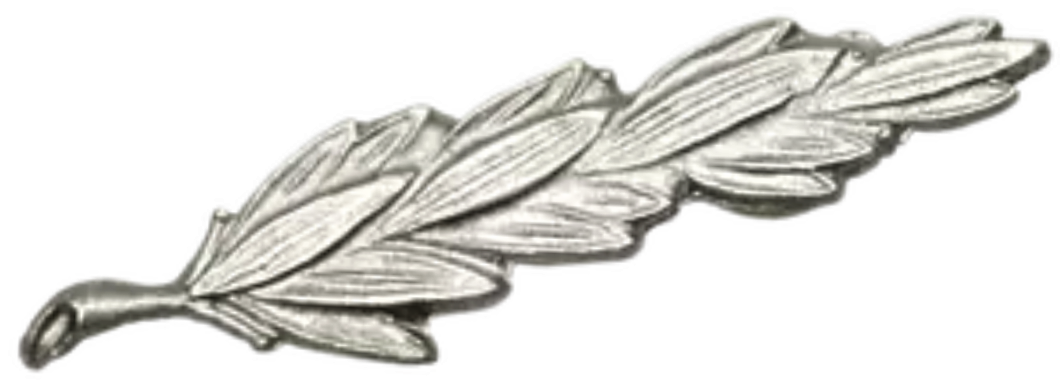
King's Commendation for Bravery device

- Petty Officer (Diver) Paul Anthony Damian Cartwright
- Lance Corporal Charley Dean Draper, Corps of Royal Engineers
- Lance Corporal Rhys Jamie Petersen, Corps of Royal Engineers

=== King's Commendation for Bravery in the Air ===
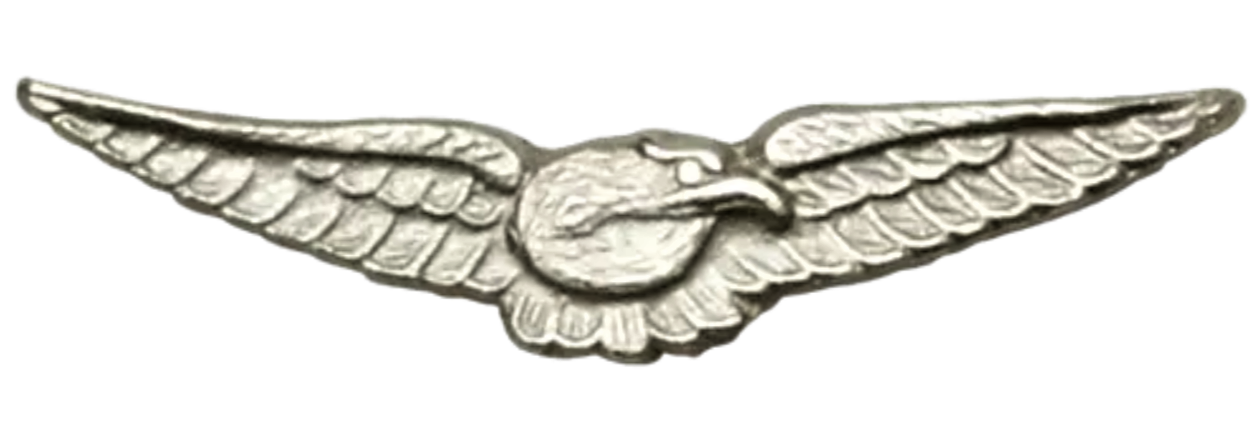
King's Commendation for Bravery in the Air device

- Flight Lieutenant Michael Martin Tenison Howell

=== Honorary promotions ===
The King has been graciously pleased to give orders for the following Honorary appointments in His Majesty’s Army to the rank of Field Marshal.

- General The Right Honourable The Lord Richards of Herstmonceux, GCB, CBE, DSO, DL
- General The Right Honourable The Lord Houghton of Richmond, GCB, CBE, DL

== Australia ==
The 2025 King's Birthday Honours for Australia were announced on 9 June 2025 by the Governor-General, Sam Mostyn.

== Canada ==
See 2025 Canadian honours

== New Zealand ==
The 2025 Birthday Honours for New Zealand were announced on 2 June 2025 by the Governor-General, Dame Cindy Kiro.

== Other Commonwealth Realms ==
=== Cook Islands ===
Appointments made by The King on the advice of his ministers in the Cook Islands.

==== Most Excellent Order of the British Empire ====
Civil division ribbon

===== Knight Commander of the Order of the British Empire (KBE) =====
Civil

- Trevor Clarke. For services to Business and Tourism.

===== Member of the Order of the British Empire (MBE) =====
Civil

- Dr. James Alcide Gosselin. For services to Public Service and to International Relations.

==== British Empire Medal (BEM) ====
British Empire Medal ribbon

- Ngatokorua Mataio. For services to Public Service and Community.

=== Bahamas ===
Appointments made by The King on the advice of his ministers in the Bahamas.

==== Most Excellent Order of the British Empire ====
Civil division ribbon

===== Officer of the Order of the British Empire (OBE) =====
Civil

- Talmage Raymond Leo Pinder. For services to the Seafood Industry.

===== Member of the Order of the British Empire (MBE) =====
Civil

- Dr. Idamae Hanna. For services to the field of Health and Wellness.
- Eva Hilton. For service in the field of Education.
- Cynthia Allison Donaldson Nee Johnson. For services in the field of Public Service and Activism.

==== King's Police Medal (KPM) ====
King's Police Medal ribbon

- Shanta Emily Knowles, Commissioner, Royal Bahamas Police Force.

=== Most Excellent Order of the British Empire ===
Civil division ribbon

==== Commander of the Order of the British Empire (CBE) ====
- Justice Andrew Crowe. For services to the Legal Training Institute, Papua New Guinea.
- Justice Colin Kenway Makail. For services to the Papua New Guinea Judiciary Service.
- Justice Mark Marai Pupaka. For services to Papua New Guinea Magisterial Services.

==== Officer of the Order of the British Empire (OBE) ====
- Humphrey John. For services to the National Judicial Staff Services.
- Robert Kaure Nilkare. For services to Business Development in Papua New Guinea.
- Amos Tepi. For services to Business.

==== Member of the Order of the British Empire (MBE) ====
- Eric Kiso. For services to the National Judicial Staff Service.
- Elijah Koju, BEM. For services to the Community.
- Bertha Punim. For services to the National Judicial Staff Service.

=== Tuvalu ===
Appointments made by The King on the advice of his ministers in Tuvalu.

==== Most Distinguished Order of St Michael and St George ====
Order of St Michael and St George ribbon

===== Companion of the Order of St Michael and St George (CMG) =====
- Sir Iftikhar Ayaz, KBE. For services to Tuvalu.

==== Most Excellent Order of the British Empire ====
Civil division ribbon

===== Officer of the Order of the British Empire (OBE) =====
- Aunese Makoi Simati. For services to the Government and to Diplomacy.

===== Member of the Order of the British Empire (MBE) =====
- Kakee Pese Kaitu. For services to Tuvalu.
- Itaia Lausaveve. For service to Public Service.
- Mila Saiumau. For services to Community Development.

==== British Empire Medal (BEM) ====
British Empire Medal ribbon

- Apiseka Mate Fousaga. For services to Community and Public Health.
- Eline Soloseni Moeava. For services to Healthcare.
- Paisi Teuki. For services to Tuvalu’s Energy Sector.

=== St Lucia ===
Appointments made by The King on the advice of his ministers in St Lucia.

==== Most Distinguished Order of St Michael and St George ====
Order of St Michael and St George ribbon

===== Companion of the Order of St Michael and St George (CMG) =====
- Henry Cecil Lay OBE. For services to the Community and to alleviating Poverty.

==== Most Excellent Order of the British Empire ====
Civil division ribbon

===== Officer of the Order of the British Empire (OBE) =====
- Noel Samuel Cadasse. For services to Community Infrastructure and Development.
- Peter Hilary Modeste. For services to Community Infrastructure and Development.

===== Member of the Order of the British Empire (MBE) =====
- Constance Aldonza. For services to Community Infrastructure and Development.
- Anthony Biddy Ifiel Goodman. For services to Community Development.
- Gregory Isidore. For services to Community Infrastructure and Development.
- Ausbert Regis. For services to Community Infrastructure and Development.

==== British Empire Medal (BEM) ====
British Empire Medal ribbon

- Elvina Phillips-Raveneau. For services to Community Development.
- Carolyn Annette Simmons. For services to the Community and towards alleviating Poverty
- Catherine Sonia Thornille. For services to Community Development.

=== Antigua & Barbuda ===
==== Most Excellent Order of the British Empire ====
Civil division ribbon

===== Officer of the Order of the British Empire (OBE) =====
- Cordel Eden Alexander Josiah, MBE. For services to Public Administration and to Community Development.

===== Member of the Order of the British Empire (MBE) =====
- Daniel Harrison. For services to Philanthropy in Antigua and Barbuda and the Commonwealth.

=== St Kitts & Nevis ===
==== Most Excellent Order of the British Empire ====
Civil division ribbon

===== Officer of the Order of the British Empire (OBE) =====
- Jacinth Lorna Henry-Martin. For service to Public Life, Diplomacy and Culture.

===== Member of the Order of the British Empire (MBE) =====
- Irma Christina Johnson. For service to Public Service and Community Outreach.

== Other nations ==
Below are awards made by Commonwealth and non-Commonwealth nations that have been authorised by Charles III in his right as King of the United Kingdom as part of the Operational Honours.

=== Canada ===
==== General Service Medal – Expedition ====
General Service Medal ribbon

- Captain James Timothy Ashlin Heath, The Royal Regiment of Fusiliers, 30213778.

==== Operational Service Medal – Expedition ====
Operational Service Medal ribbon

- Captain Harriet Colquhoun, The Royal Lancers (Queen Elizabeths’ Own), 30253692.

==== Special Service Medal – NATO ====
Special Service Medal ribbon

- Flight Lieutenant Edward George Craig, Royal Air Force, 2672365Q.
- Captain Peter Ashley Maceachen Blood, Royal Regiment of Artillery, 30075602.
- Captain Alexander John Snell, The Rifles, 30280213.

=== United States of America ===
==== Legion of Merit ====
Legion of Merit ribbon

===== Legionnaire of the Legion of Merit =====
- Colonel Samuel David Hughes, 546894.
- Colonel James Samuel Skelton, OBE, 551814.
