= 2020–21 Lamar Cardinals basketball team =

American college basketball season

2020–21 Lamar Cardinals basketball
- Conference: Southland Conference
- Record: 10–18 (6–10 Southland)
- Head coach: Tic Price (7th season)
- Assistant coaches: David Dumars (3rd season); Brandon Chappell (4th season); Joey Cantafio (2nd season)
- Home arena: Montagne Center (Capacity: 10,080)

2020–21 Southland Conference men's basketball standings
	Conf.				Overall
Team	W		L	PCT	W		L	PCT
Nicholls	14	–	2	.875	18	–	7	.720
Abilene Christian †	13	–	2	.867	24	–	5	.828
Sam Houston State	13	–	3	.813	19	–	9	.679
Stephen F. Austin*	12	–	3	.800	16	–	5	.762
Northwestern State	9	–	7	.563	11	–	18	.379
New Orleans	8	–	7	.533	10	–	15	.400
Lamar	6	–	10	.375	10	–	18	.357
Incarnate Word	5	–	9	.357	8	–	14	.364
Southeastern Louisiana	5	–	10	.333	8	–	18	.308
McNeese State	4	–	10	.286	10	–	14	.417
Houston Baptist	4	–	11	.267	6	–	19	.240
Central Arkansas	4	–	12	.250	5	–	19	.208
Texas A&M–CC	2	–	13	.133	5	–	19	.208
† 2021 Southland tournament winner *Ineligible for postseason due to postseason ban

The 2020–21 Lamar Cardinals basketball team represented Lamar University during the 2020–21 NCAA Division I men's basketball season. The Cardinals were led by seventh-year head coach Tic Price and played their home games at the Montagne Center in Beaumont, Texas. This season was the Cardinals' last as members of the Southland Conference; Lamar was one of four schools, all from Texas, that left the Southland in July 2021 to join the Western Athletic Conference.

== Previous season ==
The Cardinals finished the 2019–20 season 17–15, 10–10 in Southland play, to finish in a three-way tie for sixth place. They defeated McNeese State in the first round of the Southland tournament and were set to face Nicholls in the second round before the tournament was cancelled amid the COVID-19 pandemic.

== Roster ==
2020–21 Lamar Cardinals men's basketball team
Players
Coaches

Pos.	#	Name	Height	Weight	Year	Hometown
C	0	David Muoka	6 ft 10 in (2.08 m)	211 lb (96 kg)	So	Hong Kong
G	1	Quinlan Bennett	6 ft 3 in (1.91 m)	205 lb (93 kg)	Jr	Chicago, IL
F	2	Tarig Eisa	6 ft 8 in (2.03 m)	202 lb (92 kg)	Jr	Toronto, ON
G	3	Ellis Jefferson	6 ft 0 in (1.83 m)	195 lb (88 kg)	Sr	San Antonio, TX
G	4	Kasen Harrison	6 ft 1 in (1.85 m)	190 lb (86 kg)	Fr	Beaumont, TX
F/C	5	Avery Sullivan	6 ft 8 in (2.03 m)	237 lb (108 kg)	Sr	Pflugerville, TX
F	11	Anderson Kopp	6 ft 6 in (1.98 m)	205 lb (93 kg)	So	Houston, TX
G	13	Davion Buster	5 ft 10 in (1.78 m)	169 lb (77 kg)	Jr	Austin, TX
F	14	Corey Nickerson	6 ft 7 in (2.01 m)	191 lb (87 kg)	So	Houston, TX
F	15	Lincoln Smith	6 ft 5 in (1.96 m)	198 lb (90 kg)	Jr	Columbus, GA
G	21	Ayaan Sohail	6 ft 3 in (1.91 m)	182 lb (83 kg)	So	El Paso, TX
F	23	Mason Senigaur	6 ft 6 in (1.98 m)	201 lb (91 kg)	Jr	Beaumont, TX
F	25	Anthony Cameron	6 ft 8 in (2.03 m)	330 lb (150 kg)	Sr	Chicago, IL
F	35	Clayton Carpenter	6 ft 9 in (2.06 m)	216 lb (98 kg)	Fr	Beaumont, TX

Head coach

- Tic Price (Virginia Tech)

Assistant coach(es)

- David Dumars (Louisiana–Monroe)
- Brandon Chappell (Lamar)
- Joey Cantafio (VMI)

Legend

- (C) Team captain
- (S) Suspended
- (I) Ineligible
- (W) Walk-on
- Injured
- Current redshirt

Roster
Last update: December 10, 2020

== TV and radio media ==
All Lamar games will be broadcast on KLVI, also known as News Talk 560.

Live video of all home games (except those picked up by Southland Conference TV agreements) will be streamed on ESPN3.

== Schedule and results ==
Date time, TV	Rank^{#}	Opponent^{#}	Result	Record	Site (attendance) city, state
Non-conference regular season
November 25, 2020*; 2:00 pm, ESPN+		at No. 17 Houston	L 45–89	0–1	Fertitta Center (1,859); Houston, TX
November 27, 2020*; 1:00 pm, ESPN+		at Tulane; Tulane Classic	L 57–66	0–2	Devlin Fieldhouse (100); New Orleans, LA
November 28, 2020*; 4:00 pm, YouTube		vs. Lipscomb; Tulane Classic	L 73–76	0–3	Devlin Fieldhouse (100); New Orleans, LA
December 5, 2020*; 7:00 pm, MWN		at Air Force	L 44–59	0–4	Clune Arena; Colorado Springs, CO
December 9, 2020*; 6:00 pm, ESPN+		at Louisiana–Monroe	W 63–60	1–4	Fant–Ewing Coliseum (1,016); Monroe, LA
December 15, 2020*; 7:00 pm, ESPN+		Southern Miss	L 63–66	1–5	Montagne Center (1,541); Beaumont, TX
December 19, 2020*; 1:00 pm		at Louisiana Tech	L 57–86	1–6	Thomas Assembly Center (1,200); Ruston, LA
December 22, 2020*; 6:00 pm		at UTSA	L 66–88	1–7	Convocation Center (334); San Antonio, TX
December 29, 2020*; 7:00 pm, ESPN+		Southeastern Louisiana	W 74–64	2–7	Montagne Center (1,529); Beaumont, TX
Southland regular season
January 2, 2021; 3:00 pm, ESPN+		at Abilene Christian	L 65–83	2–8 (0–1)	Teague Special Events Center (245); Abilene, TX
January 6, 2021; 7:00 pm		at Nicholls	L 69–76	2–9 (0–2)	Stopher Gymnasium (200); Thibodaux, LA
January 9, 2021; 2:00 pm		Houston Baptist	W 71–65	3–9 (1–2)	Montagne Center (1,632); Beaumont, TX
January 13, 2021; 6:30 pm, ESPN+		at Sam Houston State	L 71–96	3–10 (1–3)	Bernard Johnson Coliseum (612); Huntsville, TX
January 16, 2021; 4:30 pm		Texas A&M–Corpus Christi	Postponed due to COVID-19 issues		Montagne Center; Beaumont, TX
January 20, 2021; 7:00 pm		Incarnate Word	Postponed due to COVID-19 issues		Montagne Center; Beaumont, TX
January 23, 2021; 4:30 pm		at Stephen F. Austin	L 72–102	3–11 (1–4)	William R. Johnson Coliseum (2,311); Nacogdoches, TX
January 30, 2021; 4:30 pm, ESPN+		McNeese State	W 64–56	4–11 (2–4)	Montagne Center (2,359); Beaumont, TX
February 3, 2021; 7:00 pm, ESPN+		Incarnate Word rescheduled from January 20	L 58–67	4–12 (2–5)	Montagne Center (871); Beaumont, TX
February 6, 2021; 4:30 pm, ESPN+		Abilene Christian	L 62–77	4–13 (2–6)	Montagne Center (1,239); Beaumont, TX
February 10, 2021; 7:00 pm, ESPN+		Nicholls	L 71–76	4–14 (2–7)	Montagne Center (831); Beaumont, TX
February 13, 2021; 5:00 pm		at Houston Baptist	L 75–80	4–15 (2–8)	Sharp Gymnasium; Houston, TX
February 17, 2021; 7:00 pm		Sam Houston State	Postponed due to weather		Montagne Center; Beaumont, TX
February 20, 2021; 3:30 pm		at Texas A&M–Corpus Christi	L 68–77	4–16 (2–9)	American Bank Center (756); Corpus Christi, TX
February 22, 2021; 7:00 pm		Sam Houston State rescheduled from February 17	L 71–77	4–17 (2–10)	Montagne Center (881); Beaumont, TX
February 24, 2021; 7:00 pm		at Incarnate Word	W 67–45	5–17 (3–10)	McDermott Center (176); San Antonio, TX
February 27, 2021; 4:30 pm		Stephen F. Austin	W 88–83 ^{2OT}	6–17 (4–10)	Montagne Center (1,112); Beaumont, TX
March 1, 2021; 7:00 pm, ESPN+		Texas A&M–Corpus Christi rescheduled from January 16	W 66–47	7–17 (5–10)	Montagne Center (828); Beaumont, TX
March 6, 2021; 4:00 pm		at McNeese State	W 60–51	8–17 (6–10)	Burton Coliseum (493); Lake Charles, LA
Southland tournament
March 10, 2021; 8:00 pm, ESPN+	(6)	vs. (10) Houston Baptist; Second round	W 62–52	9–17	Merrell Center (554); Katy, TX
March 11, 2021; 8:00 pm, ESPN+	(6)	vs. (3) Sam Houston State; Third round	W 70–69	10–17	Merrell Center (633); Katy, TX
March 12, 2021; 8:00 pm, ESPN+	(6)	vs. (2) Abilene Christian; Semifinal	L 71–93	10–18	Merrell Center (1,050); Katy, TX
*Non-conference game. ^{#}Rankings from AP poll. (#) Tournament seedings in parentheses. All times are in Central Time.

== See also ==
- 2020–21 Lamar Lady Cardinals basketball team
