= 2020–21 Incarnate Word Cardinals men's basketball team =

2019–20 Incarnate Word Cardinals men's basketball team

2020–21 Incarnate Word Cardinals men's basketball
- Conference: Southland Conference
- Record: 8–14 (5–9 Southland)
- Head coach: Carson Cunningham (3rd season)
- Assistant coaches: Taylor Land (3rd season); Chris Artis (2nd season); Ryne Smith (2nd season)
- Home arena: McDermott Center (Capacity: 2,000)

2020–21 Southland Conference men's basketball standings
	Conf.				Overall
Team	W		L	PCT	W		L	PCT
Nicholls	14	–	2	.875	18	–	7	.720
Abilene Christian †	13	–	2	.867	24	–	5	.828
Sam Houston State	13	–	3	.813	19	–	9	.679
Stephen F. Austin*	12	–	3	.800	16	–	5	.762
Northwestern State	9	–	7	.563	11	–	18	.379
New Orleans	8	–	7	.533	10	–	15	.400
Lamar	6	–	10	.375	10	–	18	.357
Incarnate Word	5	–	9	.357	8	–	14	.364
Southeastern Louisiana	5	–	10	.333	8	–	18	.308
McNeese State	4	–	10	.286	10	–	14	.417
Houston Baptist	4	–	11	.267	6	–	19	.240
Central Arkansas	4	–	12	.250	5	–	19	.208
Texas A&M–CC	2	–	13	.133	5	–	19	.208
† 2021 Southland tournament winner *Ineligible for postseason due to postseason ban

The 2020–21 Incarnate Word Cardinals men's basketball team represented the University of the Incarnate Word during the 2020–21 NCAA Division I men's basketball season. The Cardinals were led by third-year head coach Carson Cunningham and played their home games at McDermott Convocation Center in San Antonio, Texas as members of the Southland Conference. They qualified for the Southland tournament for the first time in school history.

== Previous season ==
The Cardinals finished the 2019–20 season 9–22, 6–14 in Southland play, to finish in tenth place. They failed to qualify for the Southland tournament.

== Roster ==
2020–21 Incarnate Word Cardinals men's basketball team
Players
Coaches

Pos.	#	Name	Height	Weight	Year	Previous school	Hometown
G	0	Charlie Yoder	6 ft 4 in (1.93 m)	185 lb (84 kg)	Fr	Westview HS; Spire Institute	LaGrange, IN
F	1	Bradley Akhile	6 ft 7 in (2.01 m)	200 lb (91 kg)	Jr	Stephen F. Austin HS; Gillette College	Houston, TX
G	2	Keaston Willis	6 ft 3 in (1.91 m)	180 lb (82 kg)	So	Sulphur Springs HS	Sulphur Springs, TX
G	3	Drew Lutz	6 ft 1 in (1.85 m)	165 lb (75 kg)	So	Penn HS	Granger, IN
G/F	4	Derek Van Vlerah	6 ft 6 in (1.98 m)	175 lb (79 kg)	So	Dublin Coffman HS	Dublin, OH
G	5	Brandon Swaby	6 ft 3 in (1.91 m)	170 lb (77 kg)	RS So	Northeast HS	Fort Lauderdale, FL
F	12	Dakota Reber	6 ft 6 in (1.98 m)	185 lb (84 kg)	Fr	Wilsonville HS	Milwaukie, OR
G	13	Josh Morgan	6 ft 3 in (1.91 m)	205 lb (93 kg)	Fr	Father Henry Carr Catholic	Brampton, ON
F	14	Logan Bracamonte	6 ft 5 in (1.96 m)	190 lb (86 kg)	Fr	Randolph HS	Honolulu, HI
F	15	Marcus Larsson	6 ft 11 in (2.11 m)	207 lb (94 kg)	So	Froya Basket	Oslo, Norway
F	21	Thomas Zevgaras	6 ft 8 in (2.03 m)	214 lb (97 kg)	Fr	Athinaiki Agogi & Paideia	Karditsa, Greece
F	23	Godsgift Ezedinma	6 ft 7 in (2.01 m)	200 lb (91 kg)	Fr	Midway HS	Enugu, Nigeria
G	25	Des Balentine	6 ft 0 in (1.83 m)	178 lb (81 kg)	RS Sr	Western HS; Tyler JC	Kokomo, IN
F	33	Kenyon Holcombe	6 ft 8 in (2.03 m)	206 lb (93 kg)	Fr	Concordia Lutheran HS	Houston, TX
F/C	43	Jacob Harvey	6 ft 10 in (2.08 m)	184 lb (83 kg)	Fr	Somerset HS; Western Texas CC	Somerset, TX

Head coach

- Carson Cunningham (Purdue)

Assistant coach(es)

- Kenyon Spears (Lamar)
- Taylor Land (St. Edward's)
- Chris Artis (Valparaiso)
- Ryne Smith (Purdue)

Legend

- (C) Team captain
- (S) Suspended
- (I) Ineligible
- (W) Walk-on
- Injured
- Current redshirt

Roster
Last update: March 24, 2021

== Schedule and results ==
Date time, TV	Rank^{#}	Opponent^{#}	Result	Record	Site (attendance) city, state
Non-conference Regular season
Nov 27, 2020*; 1:00 pm		Rice; UIW Invitational	L 53–68	0–1	McDermott Center; San Antonio, TX
Nov 29, 2020*; 1:00 pm		Our Lady of the Lake; UIW Invitational	W 84–71	1–1	McDermott Center (176); San Antonio, TX
Dec 2, 2020*; 7:00 pm		at Wyoming	L 83–94 ^{OT}	1–2	Arena-Auditorium (1,066); Laramie, WY
Dec 5, 2020*; 2:00 pm, ESPN+		at Texas State	L 64–72	1–3	Strahan Arena (701); San Marcos, TX
Dec 12, 2020*		Grambling State	Canceled due to COVID-19 issues		McDermott Center; San Antonio, TX
Dec 14, 2020*		Texas–Rio Grande Valley	Canceled due to COVID-19 issues		McDermott Center; San Antonio, TX
Dec 18, 2020*		at Arizona State	Canceled due to COVID-19 issues		Desert Financial Arena; Tempe, AZ
Dec 21, 2020*		at Rice	Canceled due to COVID-19 issues		Sharp Gymnasium; Houston, TX
Dec 29, 2020*; 6:00 pm, ESPN+		at No. 13 Texas Tech	L 51–79	1–4	United Supermarkets Arena (3,850); Lubbock, TX
Dec 31, 2020*; 5:00 pm		McMurry	W 92–71	2–4	McDermott Center (176); San Antonio, TX
Jan 1, 2021*; 1:00 pm		McMurry	W 81–54	3–4	McDermott Center (176); San Antonio, TX
Southland regular season
Jan 6, 2021; 6:30 pm		at Northwestern State	W 75–67	4–4 (1–0)	Prather Coliseum (439); Natchitoches, LA
Jan 9, 2021; 6:00 pm, ESPN+		at New Orleans	L 64–86	4–5 (1–1)	Lakefront Arena (425); New Orleans, LA
Jan 13, 2021; 7:00 pm		McNeese State	W 83–61	5–5 (2–1)	McDermott Center (176); San Antonio, TX
Jan 16, 2021; 6:30 pm		Stephen F. Austin	L 65–83	5–6 (2–2)	McDermott Center (176); San Antonio, TX
Jan 20, 2021; 7:00 pm		at Lamar	Postponed due to COVID-19 issues		Montagne Center; Beaumont, TX
Jan 23, 2021; 2:00 pm		Texas A&M–Corpus Christi	W 72–53	6–6 (3–2)	McDermott Center (176); San Antonio, TX
Jan 27, 2021; 7:00 pm		Houston Baptist	L 57–73	6–7 (3–3)	McDermott Center (176); San Antonio, TX
Jan 30, 2021; 6:30 pm		Abilene Christian	L 67–75	6–8 (3–4)	McDermott Center (176); San Antonio, TX
Feb 3, 2021; 7:00 pm, ESPN+		at Lamar; Rescheduled from January 20	W 67–58	7–8 (4–4)	Montagne Center (871); Beaumont, TX
Feb 6, 2021; 3:30 pm		at Texas A&M–Corpus Christi	W 58–53	8–8 (5–4)	American Bank Center (904); Corpus Christi, TX
Feb 10, 2021; 7:00 pm		Northwestern State	L 67–68	8–9 (5–5)	McDermott Center (176); San Antonio, TX
Feb 13, 2021; 6:30 pm		New Orleans	Postponed due to COVID-19 issues		McDermott Center; San Antonio, TX
Feb 17, 2021; 6:30 pm		at McNeese State	Postponed due to weather		Burton Coliseum; Lake Charles, LA
Feb 20, 2021; 4:30 pm		at Stephen F. Austin	Postponed due to weather		William R. Johnson Coliseum; Nacogdoches, TX
Feb 24, 2021; 7:00 pm		Lamar	L 45–67	8–10 (5–6)	McDermott Center (176); San Antonio, TX
Mar 1, 2021; 7:00 pm		New Orleans	L 72–88	8–11 (5–7)	McDermott Center (176); San Antonio, TX
Mar 3, 2021; 7:00 pm		at Houston Baptist	L 67–72	8–12 (5–8)	Sharp Gymnasium (140); Houston, TX
Mar 6, 2021; 3:00 pm		at Abilene Christian	L 60–85	8–13 (5–9)	Teague Special Events Center; Abilene, TX
Southland tournament
March 9, 2021; 8:00 pm, ESPN+	(7)	vs. (10) Houston Baptist; First round	L 68–80	8–14	Merrell Center; Katy, TX
*Non-conference game. ^{#}Rankings from AP poll. (#) Tournament seedings in parentheses. All times are in Central Time.
