= 2020–21 Northwestern State Demons basketball team =

American college basketball season

2020–21 Northwestern State Demons basketball
- Conference: Southland Conference
- Record: 11–18 (9–7 Southland)
- Head coach: Mike McConathy (22nd season)
- Assistant coaches: Jeff Moore; Dave Simmons; Jacob Spielbauer
- Home arena: Prather Coliseum

2020–21 Southland Conference men's basketball standings
	Conf.				Overall
Team	W		L	PCT	W		L	PCT
Nicholls	14	–	2	.875	18	–	7	.720
Abilene Christian †	13	–	2	.867	24	–	5	.828
Sam Houston State	13	–	3	.813	19	–	9	.679
Stephen F. Austin*	12	–	3	.800	16	–	5	.762
Northwestern State	9	–	7	.563	11	–	18	.379
New Orleans	8	–	7	.533	10	–	15	.400
Lamar	6	–	10	.375	10	–	18	.357
Incarnate Word	5	–	9	.357	8	–	14	.364
Southeastern Louisiana	5	–	10	.333	8	–	18	.308
McNeese State	4	–	10	.286	10	–	14	.417
Houston Baptist	4	–	11	.267	6	–	19	.240
Central Arkansas	4	–	12	.250	5	–	19	.208
Texas A&M–CC	2	–	13	.133	5	–	19	.208
† 2021 Southland tournament winner *Ineligible for postseason due to postseason ban

The 2020–21 Northwestern State Demons basketball team represented Northwestern State University in the 2020–21 NCAA Division I men's basketball season. The Demons, led by 22nd-year head coach Mike McConathy, played their home games at Prather Coliseum in Natchitoches, Louisiana as members of the Southland Conference.

== Previous season ==
The Demons finished the 2019–20 season 15–15, 11–9 in Southland play to finish in a tie for fourth place. They defeated Texas A&M–Corpus Christi in the first round of the Southland tournament and were set to take on Sam Houston State in the second round until the tournament was cancelled amid the COVID-19 pandemic.

== Roster ==
2020–21 Northwestern State Demons men's basketball team
Players
Coaches

Pos.	#	Name	Height	Weight	Year	Hometown
G	0	CJ Jones	5 ft 10 in (1.78 m)	161 lb (73 kg)	Sr	Monroe, Louisiana
G	1	LaTerrance Reed	6 ft 2 in (1.88 m)	193 lb (88 kg)	RS Sr	Buffalo, New York
G	2	John Norvel	6 ft 2 in (1.88 m)	170 lb (77 kg)	Sr	Slidell, Louisiana
G	3	Brian White	5 ft 6 in (1.68 m)	164 lb (74 kg)	Jr	Natchitoches, Louisiana
C	4	Kendal Coleman	6 ft 8 in (2.03 m)	229 lb (104 kg)	Fr	Shreveport, Louisiana
G	10	Jairus Roberson	6 ft 2 in (1.88 m)	176 lb (80 kg)	Sr	Dallas, Texas
F	11	Jamaure Gregg	6 ft 7 in (2.01 m)	232 lb (105 kg)	Sr	Oahu, Hawaii
G	12	Carvell Teasett	6 ft 1 in (1.85 m)	190 lb (86 kg)	Fr	Baton Rouge, Louisiana
G	13	Jordan Potts	6 ft 3 in (1.91 m)	175 lb (79 kg)	Jr	Bothell, Washington
G	15	Jovan Zelenbaba	6 ft 4 in (1.93 m)	177 lb (80 kg)	So	Kfar Blum, Israel
G	30	Trenton Massner	6 ft 2 in (1.88 m)	170 lb (77 kg)	Jr	Wapello, Iowa
C	32	Larry Owens	6 ft 7 in (2.01 m)	300 lb (136 kg)	Sr	Monroe, Louisiana
F	34	Robert Chougkaz	6 ft 9 in (2.06 m)	195 lb (88 kg)	So	Athens, Greece
F	35	Dalin Williams	6 ft 9 in (2.06 m)	220 lb (100 kg)	Jr	Stinnett, Texas

Head coach

- Mike McConathy (Louisiana Tech)

Assistant coach(es)

- Jeff Moore (Missouri Valley)
- Dave Simmons (Louisiana Tech)
- Jacob Spielbauer (William Penn)

Legend

- (C) Team captain
- (S) Suspended
- (I) Ineligible
- (W) Walk-on
- Injured
- Current redshirt

Roster
Last update: December 9, 2020

== Schedule and results ==
Date time, TV	Rank^{#}	Opponent^{#}	Result	Record	Site (attendance) city, state
Non-conference Regular season
November 25, 2020*; 6:00 pm, ESPN+		at No. 14 Texas Tech	L 58–101	0–1	United Supermarkets Arena (3,345); Lubbock, TX
November 28, 2020*; 3:00 pm		vs. UT Arlington; Louisiana Tech Classic	L 71–80	0–2	Thomas Assembly Center (152); Ruston, LA
November 29, 2010*; 1:00 pm		at Louisiana Tech; Louisiana Tech Classic	L 77–91	0–3	Thomas Assembly Center (1,200); Ruston, LA
December 3, 2020*; 7:00 pm, ESPN+		at TCU	L 68–74	0–4	Schollmaier Arena (1,659); Fort Worth, TX
December 6, 2020*; 2:00 pm		Louisiana–Monroe	L 83–92	0–5	Prather Coliseum (825); Natchitoches, LA
December 12, 2020*; 4:00 pm		Champion Christian	W 77–44	1–5	Prather Coliseum (419); Natchitoches, LA
December 18, 2020*; 12:00 pm, ESPN+		at Tulsa	L 55–82	1–6	Reynolds Center; Tulsa, OK
December 19, 2020*; 7:00 pm, ESPN3		at Missouri State	L 67–94	1–7	JQH Arena (1,064); Springfield, MO
December 21, 2020*; 8:00 pm, RTNW		at No. 1 Gonzaga	L 57–95	1–8	McCarthey Athletic Center; Spokane, WA
December 22, 2020*; 8:00 pm, RTNW		at No. 1 Gonzaga	L 78–95	1–9	McCarthey Athletic Center; Spokane, WA
December 23, 2020*; 4:00 pm, P12N		at Washington State	L 52–62	1–10	Beasley Coliseum; Pullman, WA
Southland Regular season
January 2, 2021; 7:00 pm		at Houston Baptist	L 93–99 ^{OT}	1–11 (0–1)	Sharp Gymnasium (101); Houston, TX
January 6, 2021; 6:30 pm		Incarnate Word	L 67–75	1–12 (0–2)	Prather Coliseum (439); Natchitoches, LA
January 9, 2021; 4:00 pm		at McNeese State	W 78–75	2–12 (1–2)	Burton Coliseum; Lake Charles, LA
January 13, 2021; 6:30 pm		Nicholls	L 66–76	2–13 (1–3)	Prather Coliseum (1,000); Natchitoches, LA
January 20, 2021; 6:30 pm, ESPN+		at Stephen F. Austin	L 74–86	2–14 (1–4)	William R. Johnson Coliseum (1,297); Nacogdoches, TX
January 23, 2021; 4:00 pm, ESPN+		at Southeastern Louisiana	W 73–68	3–14 (2–4)	University Center (403); Hammond, LA
January 27, 2021; 6:30 pm		New Orleans	W 81–73	4–14 (3–4)	Prather Coliseum (975); Natchitoches, LA
January 30, 2021; 4:00 pm		at Central Arkansas	W 81–77	5–14 (4–4)	Farris Center (147); Conway, AR
February 6, 2021; 3:00 pm		Houston Baptist	Postponed due to COVID-19 issues		Prather Coliseum; Natchitoches, LA
February 10, 2021; 7:00 pm		at Incarnate Word	W 68–67	6–14 (5–4)	McDermott Center (176); San Antonio, TX
February 13, 2021; 7:00 pm, ESPN+		McNeese State	W 69–66	7–14 (6–4)	Prather Coliseum (602); Natchitoches, LA
February 17, 2021; 7:00 pm		at Nicholls	Postponed due to weather		Stopher Gymnasium; Thibodaux, LA
February 22, 2021; 6:30 pm		Houston Baptist rescheduled from February 6	W 86–80	8–14 (7–4)	Prather Coliseum (725); Natchitoches, LA
February 24, 2021; 6:30 pm		Stephen F. Austin	L 57–83	8–15 (7–5)	Prather Coliseum (1,086); Natchitoches, LA
February 27, 2021; 3:00 pm		Southeastern Louisiana	W 79–61	9–15 (8–5)	Prather Coliseum (504); Natchitoches, LA
March 1, 2021; 6:00 pm		at Nicholls rescheduled from February 17	L 71–87	9–16 (8–6)	Stopher Gymnasium (233); Thibodaux, LA
March 3, 2021; 7:00 pm		at New Orleans	L 83–92	9–17 (8–7)	Lakefront Arena (551); New Orleans, LA
March 6, 2021; 1:00 pm		Central Arkansas	W 79–70	10–17 (9–7)	Prather Coliseum; Natchitoches, LA
Southland tournament
March 11, 2021; 5:00 pm, ESPN+	(4)	vs. (5) New Orleans; Quarterfinals	W 82–79	11–17	Merrell Center; Katy, TX
March 12, 2021; 5:00 pm, ESPN+	(4)	vs. (1) Nicholls; 3rd Round	L 76–88	11–18	Merrell Center; Katy, TX
*Non-conference game. ^{#}Rankings from AP Poll. (#) Tournament seedings in parentheses. All times are in Central.
