= 2020–21 Sam Houston State Bearkats men's basketball team =

American college basketball season

2020–21 Sam Houston State Bearkats men's basketball
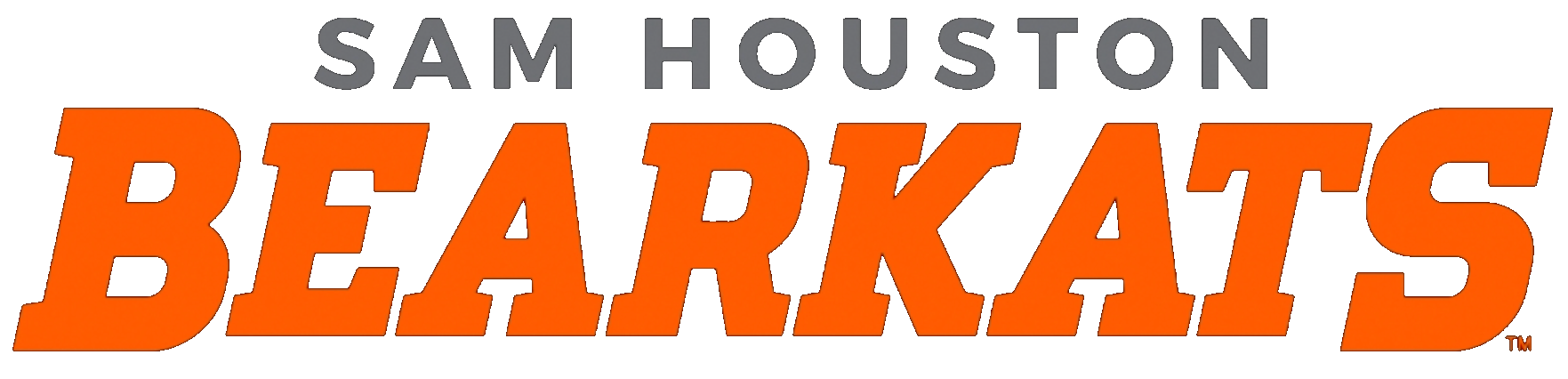
- Conference: Southland Conference
- Record: 19–9 (13–3 Southland)
- Head coach: Jason Hooten (11th season)
- Assistant coaches: Phil Forte (2nd season); Chris Mudge (11th season); Andre Owens (2nd season)
- Home arena: Bernard Johnson Coliseum (Capacity: 6,110)

2020–21 Southland Conference men's basketball standings
	Conf.				Overall
Team	W		L	PCT	W		L	PCT
Nicholls	14	–	2	.875	18	–	7	.720
Abilene Christian †	13	–	2	.867	24	–	5	.828
Sam Houston State	13	–	3	.813	19	–	9	.679
Stephen F. Austin*	12	–	3	.800	16	–	5	.762
Northwestern State	9	–	7	.563	11	–	18	.379
New Orleans	8	–	7	.533	10	–	15	.400
Lamar	6	–	10	.375	10	–	18	.357
Incarnate Word	5	–	9	.357	8	–	14	.364
Southeastern Louisiana	5	–	10	.333	8	–	18	.308
McNeese State	4	–	10	.286	10	–	14	.417
Houston Baptist	4	–	11	.267	6	–	19	.240
Central Arkansas	4	–	12	.250	5	–	19	.208
Texas A&M–CC	2	–	13	.133	5	–	19	.208
† 2021 Southland tournament winner *Ineligible for postseason due to postseason ban

The 2020–21 Sam Houston State Bearkats men's basketball team represented Sam Houston State University in the 2020–21 NCAA Division I men's basketball season. The Bearkats, led by 11th-year head coach Jason Hooten, played their home games at the Bernard Johnson Coliseum in Huntsville, Texas.

The season was the Bearkats' last as members of the Southland Conference; Sam Houston is one of four schools, all from Texas, that left the Southland in July 2021 to join the Western Athletic Conference.

== Previous season ==
The Bearkats finished the 2019–20 season 18–13, 11–9 in Southland play to finish in a tie for fourth place. They were set to on Northwestern State in the second round of the Southland tournament until the tournament was cancelled amid the COVID-19 pandemic.

== Roster ==
2020–21 Sam Houston State Bearkats men's basketball team
Players
Coaches

Pos.	#	Name	Height	Weight	Year	Hometown
G	0	Bryce Monroe	5 ft 11 in (1.8 m)	170 lb (77 kg)	Fr	San Francisco, California
F	1	Manny Crump	6 ft 8 in (2.03 m)	205 lb (93 kg)	RS Jr	Miami, Florida
G	2	Jarren Cook	6 ft 4 in (1.93 m)	200 lb (91 kg)	Fr	Carrollton, Texas
G	3	Demarkus Lampley	6 ft 2 in (1.88 m)	170 lb (77 kg)	Sr	Phenix City, Alabama
G	5	Terryonte Thomas	6 ft 4 in (1.93 m)	205 lb (93 kg)	Sr	Columbus, Mississippi
G	10	Zach Nutall	6 ft 3 in (1.91 m)	185 lb (84 kg)	Jr	Bryan, Texas
G	11	Javion Mary	6 ft 2 in (1.88 m)	190 lb (86 kg)	Jr	Chicago, Illinois
F	12	Tristan Ikpe	6 ft 6 in (1.98 m)	210 lb (95 kg)	Jr	Deer Park, Texas
G	13	Pierce Hellums	6 ft 2 in (1.88 m)	170 lb (77 kg)	RS Fr	Tomball, Texas
G	21	DJ Kelley	6 ft 3 in (1.91 m)	225 lb (102 kg)	RS Fr	Cantonment, Florida
F	22	Dylan Robertson	6 ft 10 in (2.08 m)	210 lb (95 kg)	RS Jr	Tuscaloosa, Alabama
G	24	Donte Powers	6 ft 2 in (1.88 m)	180 lb (82 kg)	Jr	Starkville, Mississippi
C	33	Austin Brewer	6 ft 10 in (2.08 m)	185 lb (84 kg)	Fr	Abilene, Texas
F	24	Kian Scroggins	6 ft 7 in (2.01 m)	235 lb (107 kg)	Fr	Raymore, Missouri
F	54	Cyrus Johnson	6 ft 5 in (1.96 m)	220 lb (100 kg)	RS So	Culver City, California

Head coach

- Jason Hooten (Tarleton State)

Assistant coach(es)

- Phil Forte (Oklahoma State)
- Chris Mudge (Texas)
- Andre Owens (Texas–San Antonio)

Legend

- (C) Team captain
- (S) Suspended
- (I) Ineligible
- (W) Walk-on
- Injured
- Current redshirt

Roster
Last update: December 8, 2020

== Schedule and results ==
Date time, TV	Rank^{#}	Opponent^{#}	Result	Record	Site (attendance) city, state
Non-conference Regular season
November 25, 2020*; 7:00 pm, ESPN+		at SMU	L 67–97	0–1	Moody Coliseum (1,530); University Park, TX
November 27, 2020*; 1:00 pm, ESPNU		at No. 14 Texas Tech; Southwest Showcase	L 52–84	0–2	United Supermarkets Arena (3,176); Lubbock, TX
November 29, 2020*; 1:00 pm		vs. Boise State; Southwest Showcase	L 55–86	0–3	Dickies Arena (3,568); Fort Worth, TX
December 4, 2020*; 6:30 pm		Dallas Christian	W 117–42	1–3	Bernard Johnson Coliseum (498); Huntsville, TX
December 6, 2020*; 5:00 pm, ESPN+		Howard Payne	W 117–54	2–3	Bernard Johnson Coliseum (463); Huntsville, TX
December 9, 2020*; 7:00 pm, ESPN+		at No. 7 Houston	Canceled due to COVID-19 issues		Fertitta Center; Houston, TX
December 10, 2020*; 6:30 pm		LeTourneau	W 107–65	3–3	Bernard Johnson Coliseum (427); Huntsville, TX
December 14, 2020*; 11:00 am, SECN		at LSU	L 66–88	3–4	Pete Maravich Assembly Center (55); Baton Rouge, LA
December 16, 2020*; 7:00 pm, LHN		at No. 11 Texas	L 63–79	3–5	Frank Erwin Center (2,411); Austin, TX
December 19, 2020*; 2:00 pm		Rice	W 82–69	4–5	Bernard Johnson Coliseum (504); Huntsville, TX
December 21, 2020*; 6:00 pm		at Texas–Rio Grande Valley	W 69–66	5–5	UTRGV Fieldhouse (131); Edinburg, TX
December 29, 2020*; 6:30 pm		Mary Hardin–Baylor	W 101–59	6–5	Bernard Johnson Coliseum (501); Huntsville, TX
Southland Regular season
January 2, 2021; 5:00 pm, ESPN+		at Nicholls	W 84–81	7–5 (1–0)	Stopher Gymnasium (200); Thibodaux, LA
January 6, 2021; 7:00 pm, ESPN+		at Southeastern Louisiana	W 70–52	8–5 (2–0)	University Center (318); Hammond, LA
January 9, 2021; 4:00 pm, ESPN+		at Central Arkansas	W 91–80	9–5 (3–0)	Farris Center (485); Conway, AR
January 13, 2021; 6:30 pm, ESPN+		Lamar	W 96–71	10—5 (4–0)	Bernard Johnson Coliseum (612); Huntsville, TX
January 16, 2021; 5:00 pm, ESPN+		Houston Baptist	W 87–80	11–5 (5–0)	Bernard Johnson Coliseum (695); Huntsville, TX
January 20, 2021; 8:30 pm, ESPN+		Abilene Christian	W 64–57	12–5 (6–0)	Bernard Johnson Coliseum (707); Huntsville, TX
January 27, 2021; 7:00 pm		at Texas A&M–Corpus Christi	W 75–70	13–5 (7–0)	American Bank Center (837); Corpus Christi, TX
January 31, 2021; 3:00 pm, ESPNU		at Stephen F. Austin	L 68–78	13–6 (7–1)	William R. Johnson Coliseum (1,989); Nacogdoches, TX
February 6, 2021; 5:00 pm, ESPN+		Nicholls	W 78–71	14–6 (8–1)	Bernard Johnson Coliseum (812); Huntsville, TX
February 10, 2021; 6:30 pm, ESPN+		Southeastern Louisiana	W 79–61	15–6 (9–1)	Bernard Johnson Coliseum (554); Huntsville, TX
February 13, 2021; 5:00 pm, ESPN+		Central Arkansas	W 97–57	16–6 (10–1)	Bernard Johnson Coliseum (677); Huntsville, TX
February 17, 2021; 7:00 pm, ESPN+		at Lamar	Postponed due to weather		Montagne Center; Beaumont, TX
February 20, 2021; 7:00 pm		at Houston Baptist	Postponed due to weather		Sharp Gymnasium; Houston, TX
February 22, 2021; 7:00 pm, ESPN+		at Lamar rescheduled from February 17	W 77–71	17–6 (11–1)	Montagne Center (881); Beaumont, TX
February 24, 2021; 7:30 pm, ESPN+		at Abilene Christian	L 72–86	17–7 (11–2)	Teague Special Events Center (507); Abilene, TX
March 1, 2021; 7:00 pm		at Houston Baptist rescheduled from February 20	W 83–70	18–7 (12–2)	Sharp Gymnasium (140); Houston, TX
March 3, 2021; 6:30 pm, ESPN+		Texas A&M–Corpus Christi	W 84–61	19–7 (13–2)	Bernard Johnson Coliseum (684); Huntsville, TX
March 6, 2021; 5:00 pm, ESPN+		Stephen F. Austin	L 59–64	19–8 (13–3)	Bernard Johnson Coliseum (1,215); Huntsville, TX
Southland tournament
March 11, 2021; 8:00 pm, ESPN+	(3)	vs. (6) Lamar; Quarterfinals	L 69–70	19–9	Merrell Center (633); Katy, TX
*Non-conference game. ^{#}Rankings from AP Poll. (#) Tournament seedings in parentheses. All times are in Central.
