= 2020–21 Texas A&M–Corpus Christi Islanders men's basketball team =

American college basketball season

2020–21 Texas A&M–Corpus Christi Islanders men's basketball
- Conference: Southland Conference
- Record: 5–19 (2–13 Southland)
- Head coach: Willis Wilson (10th season)
- Associate head coach: Marty Gross
- Assistant coaches: Mark Dannhoff; Terry Johnson
- Home arena: American Bank Center; Dugan Wellness Center

2020–21 Southland Conference men's basketball standings
| | Conf. | | | | Overall |
| Team | W | | L | PCT | W | | L | PCT |
|---|---|---|---|---|---|---|---|---|
| Nicholls | 14 | – | 2 | .875 | 18 | – | 7 | .720 |
| Abilene Christian † | 13 | – | 2 | .867 | 24 | – | 5 | .828 |
| Sam Houston State | 13 | – | 3 | .813 | 19 | – | 9 | .679 |
| Stephen F. Austin* | 12 | – | 3 | .800 | 16 | – | 5 | .762 |
| Northwestern State | 9 | – | 7 | .563 | 11 | – | 18 | .379 |
| New Orleans | 8 | – | 7 | .533 | 10 | – | 15 | .400 |
| Lamar | 6 | – | 10 | .375 | 10 | – | 18 | .357 |
| Incarnate Word | 5 | – | 9 | .357 | 8 | – | 14 | .364 |
| Southeastern Louisiana | 5 | – | 10 | .333 | 8 | – | 18 | .308 |
| McNeese State | 4 | – | 10 | .286 | 10 | – | 14 | .417 |
| Houston Baptist | 4 | – | 11 | .267 | 6 | – | 19 | .240 |
| Central Arkansas | 4 | – | 12 | .250 | 5 | – | 19 | .208 |
| Texas A&M–CC | 2 | – | 13 | .133 | 5 | – | 19 | .208 |
† 2021 Southland tournament winner *Ineligible for postseason due to postseason ban

The 2020–21 Texas A&M–Corpus Christi Islanders men's basketball team represented Texas A&M University–Corpus Christi in the 2020–21 NCAA Division I men's basketball season. The Islanders, led by tenth-year head coach Willis Wilson, played their home games at American Bank Center, with two games at the Dugan Wellness Center, both of which are in Corpus Christi, Texas, as members of the Southland Conference.

== Previous season ==
The Islanders finished the 2019–20 season 14–18, 10–10 in Southland play, to finish in a three-way tie for sixth place. They lost in the first round of the Southland tournament to Northwestern State.

== Roster ==
2020–21 Texas A&M–Corpus Christi Islanders men's basketball team
Players
Coaches

| Pos. | # | Name | Height | Weight | Year | Hometown |
|---|---|---|---|---|---|---|
| G | 0 | Cyrie Jr. Coates | 6 ft 6 in (1.98 m) | 190 lb (86 kg) | Jr | Philadelphia, PA |
| G | 1 | Jordan Hairston | 6 ft 0 in (1.83 m) | 160 lb (73 kg) | So | Centreville, VA |
| G | 2 | Myles Smith | 6 ft 0 in (1.83 m) | 190 lb (86 kg) | Sr | Klein, TX |
| G/F | 3 | Jalen White | 6 ft 5 in (1.96 m) | 245 lb (111 kg) | So | St. Petersburg, FL |
| F | 4 | Lado Laku | 6 ft 10 in (2.08 m) | 215 lb (98 kg) | Fr | Dallas, TX |
| G | 5 | Javae Lampkins | 6 ft 1 in (1.85 m) | 180 lb (82 kg) | Jr | Washington, D.C. |
| F | 10 | Perry Francois | 6 ft 8 in (2.03 m) | 240 lb (109 kg) | Sr | North Miami, FL |
| G | 11 | Rasheed Browne | 6 ft 2 in (1.88 m) | 175 lb (79 kg) | Jr | Philadelphia, PA |
| G | 12 | Peyton Smith | 6 ft 2 in (1.88 m) | 195 lb (88 kg) | Sr | Corpus Christi, TX |
| F | 13 | De'Lazarus Keys | 6 ft 8 in (2.03 m) | 230 lb (104 kg) | Jr | Orlando, FL |
| G | 14 | Eden Davis | 5 ft 9 in (1.75 m) | 160 lb (73 kg) | Fr | Dover, DE |
| G | 21 | Evan Smith | 6 ft 0 in (1.83 m) | 185 lb (84 kg) | So | Spring, TX |
| G | 22 | Simeon Fryer | 6 ft 5 in (1.96 m) | 185 lb (84 kg) | Jr | Philadelphia, PA |
| F | 23 | Jalen Myers | 6 ft 7 in (2.01 m) | 190 lb (86 kg) | Fr | Madison, AL |
| F | 24 | Kerry Richardson | 6 ft 8 in (2.03 m) | 195 lb (88 kg) | Jr | Riverdale, GA |
| G | 32 | Nolan Bertain | 6 ft 4 in (1.93 m) | 185 lb (84 kg) | Sr | Portland, OR |

Head coach

- Willis Wilson (Rice)

Assistant coach(es)

- Marty Gross (Jacksonville)
- Mark Dannhoff (UW–La Crosse)
- Terry Johnson (Stanislaus State)

Legend

- (C) Team captain
- (S) Suspended
- (I) Ineligible
- (W) Walk-on
- Injured
- Current redshirt

Roster
Last update: December 9, 2020

== Schedule and results ==
| Date time, TV | Rank^{#} | Opponent^{#} | Result | Record | Site (attendance) city, state |
Non-conference regular season
| November 25, 2020*; 7:30 p.m., KDF | | Texas A&M–International | W 64–53 | 1–0 | American Bank Center (527); Corpus Christi, TX |
| November 28, 2020*; 2:00 p.m. | | Texas State | L 63–75 | 1–1 | American Bank Center (445); Corpus Christi, TX |
| November 30, 2020*; 7:00 p.m., ESPN+ | | at SMU | L 54–91 | 1–2 | Moody Coliseum (1,501); University Park, TX |
| December 2, 2020*; 7:00 p.m. | | at Texas–Rio Grande Valley; South Texas Showdown | L 59–62 | 1–3 | Bert Ogden Arena (962); Edinburg, TX |
| December 4, 2020* | | Arlington Baptist | Canceled due to COVID-19 issues | | Dugan Wellness Center; Corpus Christi, TX |
| December 10, 2020*; 7:00 p.m. | | Texas–Rio Grande Valley; South Texas Showdown | L 64–68 | 1–4 | American Bank Center (465); Corpus Christi, TX |
| December 12, 2020*; 1:00 p.m. | | at No. 17 Texas Tech | L 57–77 | 1–5 | United Supermarkets Arena (1,380); Lubbock, TX |
| December 15, 2020*; 7:00 p.m., ESPN+ | | at Texas State | L 46–51 | 1–6 | Strahan Arena (752); San Marcos, TX |
| December 19, 2020*; 2:00 p.m. | | Our Lady of the Lake | W 99–72 | 2–6 | Dugan Wellness Center (144); Corpus Christi, TX |
| December 22, 2020*; 2:00 p.m. | | Paul Quinn | W 59–35 | 3–6 | Dugan Wellness Center (109); Corpus Christi, TX |
| December 29, 2020*; 7:00 p.m., LHN | | at No. 8 Texas | Canceled due to COVID-19 issues | | Frank Erwin Center; Austin, TX |
Southland regular season
| January 2, 2021; 4:00 p.m., ESPN+ | | at Southeastern Louisiana | Postponed due to COVID-19 issues | | University Center; Hammond, LA |
| January 6, 2021; 7:00 p.m. | | Stephen F. Austin | Postponed due to COVID-19 issues | | American Bank Center; Corpus Christi, TX |
| January 9, 2021; 3:30 p.m. | | Abilene Christian | Postponed due to COVID-19 issues | | American Bank Center; Corpus Christi, TX |
| January 13, 2021; 7:00 p.m., ESPN+ | | at Southeastern Louisiana; Rescheduled from January 2 | L 63–76 | 3–7 (0–1) | University Center (283); Hammond, LA |
| January 16, 2021; 4:30 p.m. | | at Lamar | Postponed due to COVID-19 issues | | Montagne Center; Beaumont, TX |
| January 20, 2021; 7:00 p.m. | | at New Orleans | L 68–87 | 3–8 (0–2) | Lakefront Arena (500); New Orleans, LA |
| January 23, 2021; 2:00 p.m. | | at Incarnate Word | L 53–72 | 3–9 (0–3) | McDermott Center (176); San Antonio, TX |
| January 27, 2021; 7:00 p.m. | | Sam Houston State | L 70–75 | 3–10 (0–4) | American Bank Center (837); Corpus Christi, TX |
| January 30, 2021; 3:30 p.m. | | Houston Baptist | Postponed due to COVID-19 issues | | American Bank Center; Corpus Christi, TX |
| February 1, 2021; 7:00 p.m. | | Abilene Christian; Rescheduled from January 9 | Postponed due to COVID-19 issues | | American Bank Center; Corpus Christi, TX |
| February 3, 2021; 7:00 p.m. | | Stephen F. Austin; Rescheduled from January 6 | L 75–84 | 3–11 (0–5) | American Bank Center (699); Corpus Christi, TX |
| February 6, 2021; 7:00 p.m. | | Incarnate Word | L 53–58 | 3–12 (0–6) | American Bank Center (904); Corpus Christi, TX |
| February 8, 2021; 7:00 p.m. | | Abilene Christian; Rescheduled from February 1 | L 69–82 | 3–13 (0–7) | American Bank Center (464); Corpus Christi, TX |
| February 10, 2021; 6:30 p.m., ESPN+ | | at Stephen F. Austin | L 68–80 | 3–14 (0–8) | William R. Johnson Coliseum; Nacogdoches, TX |
| February 13, 2021; 7:30 p.m., ESPN+ | | at Abilene Christian | L 55–83 | 3–15 (0–9) | Teague Special Events Center (416); Abilene, TX |
| February 15, 2021; 7:00 p.m. | | Houston Baptist; Rescheduled from January 30 | Canceled due to weather | | American Bank Center; Corpus Christi, TX |
| February 17, 2021; 7:30 p.m. | | Southeastern Louisiana | Postponed due to weather | | American Bank Center; Corpus Christi, TX |
| February 20, 2021; 4:00 p.m., ESPN+ | | Lamar | W 77–68 | 4–15 (1–9) | American Bank Center (756); Corpus Christi, TX |
| February 22, 2021; 6:30 p.m. | | Southeastern Louisiana; Rescheduled from February 17 | L 75–78 | 4–16 (1–10) | American Bank Center (633); Corpus Christi, TX |
| February 24, 2021; 7:00 p.m. | | New Orleans | L 61–69 | 4–17 (1–11) | American Bank Center (708); Corpus Christi, TX |
| March 1, 2021; 7:00 p.m., ESPN+ | | at Lamar; Rescheduled from January 16 | L 47–66 | 4–18 (1–12) | Montagne Center (828); Beaumont, TX |
| March 3, 2021; 6:30 p.m., ESPN+ | | at Sam Houston State | L 61–84 | 4–19 (1–13) | Bernard Johnson Coliseum (684); Huntsville, TX |
| March 6, 2021; 5:00 p.m. | | at Houston Baptist | W 94–70 | 5–19 (2–13) | Sharp Gymnasium (140); Houston, TX |
*Non-conference game. ^{#}Rankings from AP poll. (#) Tournament seedings in parentheses. All times are in Central.
