= 2020–21 Nicholls Colonels men's basketball team =

American college basketball season

2020–21 Nicholls Colonels men's basketball

Southland regular season champions
- Conference: Southland Conference
- Record: 18–7 (14–2 Southland)
- Head coach: Austin Claunch (3rd season)
- Associate head coach: Trevor Deloach
- Assistant coaches: Nick Bowman; Joey Brooks
- Home arena: Stopher Gymnasium

2020–21 Southland Conference men's basketball standings
	Conf.				Overall
Team	W		L	PCT	W		L	PCT
Nicholls	14	–	2	.875	18	–	7	.720
Abilene Christian †	13	–	2	.867	24	–	5	.828
Sam Houston State	13	–	3	.813	19	–	9	.679
Stephen F. Austin*	12	–	3	.800	16	–	5	.762
Northwestern State	9	–	7	.563	11	–	18	.379
New Orleans	8	–	7	.533	10	–	15	.400
Lamar	6	–	10	.375	10	–	18	.357
Incarnate Word	5	–	9	.357	8	–	14	.364
Southeastern Louisiana	5	–	10	.333	8	–	18	.308
McNeese State	4	–	10	.286	10	–	14	.417
Houston Baptist	4	–	11	.267	6	–	19	.240
Central Arkansas	4	–	12	.250	5	–	19	.208
Texas A&M–CC	2	–	13	.133	5	–	19	.208
† 2021 Southland tournament winner *Ineligible for postseason due to postseason ban

The 2020–21 Nicholls Colonels men's basketball team represented Nicholls State University in the 2020–21 NCAA Division I men's basketball season. The Colonels, led by third-year head coach Austin Claunch, played their home games at Stopher Gymnasium in Thibodaux, Louisiana as members of the Southland Conference.

== Previous season ==
The Colonels finished the 2019–20 season 21–10, 15–5 in Southland play to finish in a tie for second place. They were set to take on Lamar in the second round of the Southland tournament until the tournament was cancelled amid the COVID-19 pandemic.

== Roster ==
2020–21 Nicholls Colonels men's basketball team
Players
Coaches

Pos.	#	Name	Height	Weight	Year	Hometown
G	0	Ty Gordon	6 ft 1 in (1.85 m)	200 lb (91 kg)	RS Jr	Tunica, Mississippi
F	1	Jaylen Fornes	6 ft 3 in (1.91 m)	210 lb (95 kg)	RS Sr	Pamlico County, North Carolina
G	1	AJ Fainey	5 ft 10 in (1.78 m)	155 lb (70 kg)	RS Jr	Gray, Louisiana
G	3	Kevin Johnson	6 ft 0 in (1.83 m)	160 lb (73 kg)	Sr	Thibodaux, Louisiana
F	4	Damien Sears	6 ft 7 in (2.01 m)	245 lb (111 kg)	RS Sr	Haughton, Louisiana
F	5	Najee Garvin	6 ft 7 in (2.01 m)	210 lb (95 kg)	RS Jr	Lexington, South Carolina
F	10	Anquaevious Pollard	6 ft 7 in (2.01 m)	200 lb (91 kg)	Jr	Lanett, Alabama
G	11	Jeremiah Buford	6 ft 5 in (1.96 m)	185 lb (84 kg)	Sr	Atlanta, Georgia
G	13	Andre Jones	6 ft 4 in (1.93 m)	200 lb (91 kg)	RS Sr	Little Rock, Arkansas
F	14	Taylor Blanchard	6 ft 5 in (1.96 m)	165 lb (75 kg)	Fr	Morgan City, Louisiana
G	15	Tyrease Terrell	6 ft 4 in (1.93 m)	165 lb (75 kg)	So	Slidell, Louisiana
C	21	Ryghe Lyons	6 ft 11 in (2.11 m)	280 lb (127 kg)	Sr	Slidell, Louisiana
G	24	Quinn Strander	5 ft 10 in (1.78 m)	175 lb (79 kg)	Fr	Thibodaux, Louisiana
G	25	Pierce Spencer	6 ft 3 in (1.91 m)	175 lb (79 kg)	Fr	Porter, Texas
G	35	Isaac Johnson	6 ft 3 in (1.91 m)	210 lb (95 kg)	RS Jr	Minneapolis, Minnesota
G	55	Shawn Williams	6 ft 1 in (1.85 m)	180 lb (82 kg)	Sr	Little Rock, Arkansas

Head coach

- Austin Claunch (Emory)

Assistant coach(es)

- Trevor Deloach (UNCW)
- Nick Bowman (Eastern Kentucky)
- Joey Brooks (Notre Dame)

Legend

- (C) Team captain
- (S) Suspended
- (I) Ineligible
- (W) Walk-on
- Injured
- Current redshirt

Roster
Last update: December 8, 2020

== Schedule and results ==
Due to COVID-19 protocol, Nicholls suspended activities from December 7 through December 26, cancelling five scheduled games.

Date time, TV	Rank^{#}	Opponent^{#}	Result	Record	Site (attendance) city, state
Regular season
November 25, 2020*; 9:00 pm		vs. UC Davis; Bronco Invitational	W 101–93	1–0	Leavey Center; Santa Clara, CA
November 27, 2020*; 6:00 pm		vs. Idaho State; Bronco Invitational	W 70–51	2–0	Leavey Center; Santa Clara, CA
November 28, 2020*; 6:00 pm		at Santa Clara; Bronco Invitational	L 57–73	2–1	Leavey Center; Santa Clara, CA
November 30, 2020*; 6:30 pm, P12N		at California	W 60–49	2–2	Haas Pavilion; Berkeley, CA
December 1, 2020*; 9:00 pm		at Saint Mary's	L 50–73	2–3	University Credit Union Pavilion; Moraga, CA
December 8, 2020*; 8:00 pm		at No. 2 Baylor	Canceled due to COVID-19 issues		Ferrell Center; Waco, Texas
December 10, 2020*; 7:00 pm		Campbellsville	Canceled due to COVID-19 issues		Stopher Gymnasium; Thibodaux, LA
December 12, 2020*; 7:00 pm		Carver	Canceled due to COVID-19 issues		Stopher Gymnasium; Thibodaux, LA
December 15, 2020*; 7:00 pm		Arlington Baptist	Canceled due to COVID-19 issues		Stopher Gymnasium; Thibodaux, LA
December 23, 2020*		at Southern Illinois	Canceled due to COVID-19 issues		Banterra Center; Carbondale, IL
December 26, 2020*; 1:00 pm, SECN		at LSU	L 80–86	2–4	Pete Maravich Assembly Center (2,198); Baton Rouge, LA
December 27, 2020*; 5:00 pm		Paul Quinn	Canceled due to COVID-19 issues		Stopher Gymnasium; Thibodaux, LA
December 28, 2020*; 12:00 pm		Paul Quinn	Canceled due to COVID-19 issues		Stopher Gymnasium; Thibodaux, LA
January 2, 2021; 5:00 pm, ESPN+		Sam Houston State	L 81–84	2–5 (0–1)	Stopher Gymnasium (200); Thibodaux, LA
January 6, 2021; 7:00 pm		Lamar	W 76–69	3–5 (1–1)	Stopher Gymnasium (200); Thibodaux, LA
January 9, 2021; 5:00 pm		Southeastern Louisiana	W 87–67	4–5 (2–1)	Stopher Gymnasium (211); Thibodaux, LA
January 13, 2021; 6:30 pm		at Northwestern State	W 76–66	5–5 (3–1)	Prather Coliseum (1,000); Natchitoches, LA
January 16, 2021; 4:00 pm		at Central Arkansas	W 74–72	6–5 (4–1)	Stopher Gymnasium (258); Thibodaux, LA
January 20, 2021; 7:00 pm		at Houston Baptist	W 92–83	7–5 (5–1)	Sharp Gymnasium (140); Houston, TX
January 23, 2021; 5:00 pm		New Orleans	W 86–62	8–5 (6–1)	Stopher Gymnasium (230); Thibodaux, LA
January 24, 2021; 2:00 pm		Carver rescheduled from December 12	W 105–60	9–5	Stopher Gymnasium (97); Thibodaux, LA
January 27, 2021; 7:00 pm		McNeese State	W 76–69	10–5 (7–1)	Stopher Gymnasium (230); Thibodaux, LA
February 6, 2021; 5:00 pm, ESPN+		at Sam Houston State	L 71–78	10–6 (7–2)	Bernard Johnson Coliseum (812); Huntsville, TX
February 10, 2021; 7:00 pm, ESPN+		at Lamar	W 76–71	11–6 (8–2)	Montagne Center (831); Thibodaux, LA
February 13, 2021; 7:00 pm, ESPN+		at Southeastern Louisiana	W 86–84 ^{OT}	12–6 (9–2)	University Center (531); Hammond, LA
February 17, 2021; 7:00 pm		Northwestern State	Postponed due to weather		Stopher Gymnasium; Thibodaux, LA
February 20, 2021; 5:00 pm		Central Arkansas	W 79–68	13–6 (10–2)	Stopher Gymnasium (132); Thibodaux, LA
February 24, 2021; 7:00 pm		Houston Baptist	W 83–68	14–6 (11–2)	Stopher Gymnasium (231); Thibodaux, LA
February 27, 2021; 6:00 pm		at New Orleans	W 105–101 ^{OT}	15–6 (12–2)	Lakefront Arena (726); New Orleans, LA
March 1, 2021; 6:00 pm		Northwestern State rescheduled from February 17	W 87–71	16–6 (13–2)	Stopher Gymnasium (233); Thibodaux, LA
March 4, 2021; 6:30 pm		at McNeese State	W 80–67	17–6 (14–2)	Burton Coliseum (255); Lake Charles, LA
Southland tournament
March 12, 2021; 5:00 pm, ESPN+	(1)	vs. (4) Northwestern State; Semifinals	W 88–76	18–6	Merrell Center; Katy, TX
March 13, 2021; 8:30 pm, ESPN2	(1)	vs. (2) Abilene Christian; Championship	L 45–79	18–7	Merrell Center; Katy, TX
*Non-conference game. ^{#}Rankings from AP Poll. (#) Tournament seedings in parentheses. All times are in Central.
