= 2020–21 McNeese State Cowboys basketball team =

American college basketball season

2020–21 McNeese State Cowboys basketball
- Conference: Southland Conference
- Record: 10–14 (4–10 Southland)
- Head coach: Heath Schroyer (3rd season)
- Associate head coach: John Aiken
- Assistant coaches: Mike Dubose; Jalen Courtney
- Home arena: Burton Coliseum

2020–21 Southland Conference men's basketball standings
	Conf.				Overall
Team	W		L	PCT	W		L	PCT
Nicholls	14	–	2	.875	18	–	7	.720
Abilene Christian †	13	–	2	.867	24	–	5	.828
Sam Houston State	13	–	3	.813	19	–	9	.679
Stephen F. Austin*	12	–	3	.800	16	–	5	.762
Northwestern State	9	–	7	.563	11	–	18	.379
New Orleans	8	–	7	.533	10	–	15	.400
Lamar	6	–	10	.375	10	–	18	.357
Incarnate Word	5	–	9	.357	8	–	14	.364
Southeastern Louisiana	5	–	10	.333	8	–	18	.308
McNeese State	4	–	10	.286	10	–	14	.417
Houston Baptist	4	–	11	.267	6	–	19	.240
Central Arkansas	4	–	12	.250	5	–	19	.208
Texas A&M–CC	2	–	13	.133	5	–	19	.208
† 2021 Southland tournament winner *Ineligible for postseason due to postseason ban

The 2020–21 McNeese State Cowboys basketball team represented McNeese State University in the 2020–21 NCAA Division I men's basketball season. The Cowboys, led by third-year head coach Heath Schroyer, played their home games at Burton Coliseum, due to hurricane damage at the HH&P Complex, in Lake Charles, Louisiana as members of the Southland Conference.

== Previous season ==
The Cowboys finished the 2019–20 season 15–17, 10–10 in Southland play to finish in a three-way tie for sixth place. They lost in the first round of the Southland tournament to Lamar.

== Roster ==
2020–21 McNeese State Cowboys men's basketball team
Players
Coaches

Pos.	#	Name	Height	Weight	Year	Hometown
G	0	Dru Kuxhausen	6 ft 0 in (1.83 m)	180 lb (82 kg)	Sr	Scottsbluff, Nebraska
F	1	Jeremy Harrell	6 ft 8 in (2.03 m)	240 lb (109 kg)	Sr	Pickens, Mississippi
F	2	Keyshawn Feazell	6 ft 9 in (2.06 m)	235 lb (107 kg)	Sr	New Hebron, Mississippi
G	3	Collin Warren	6 ft 4 in (1.93 m)	190 lb (86 kg)	RS Fr	Houston, Texas
G	5	Evan Palmquist	6 ft 4 in (1.93 m)	185 lb (84 kg)	RS Fr	Houston, Texas
G	10	Braelon Bush	5 ft 6 in (1.68 m)	155 lb (70 kg)	Fr	Silsbee, Texas
G	11	Myles Hutchinson	6 ft 1 in (1.85 m)	180 lb (82 kg)	Sr	Abbeville, Louisiana
G	12	A.J. Lawson	6 ft 5 in (1.96 m)	215 lb (98 kg)	RS Sr	Bryan, Texas
G	13	Luis Rivas	6 ft 5 in (1.96 m)	190 lb (86 kg)	RS Jr	Guadalajara, Mexico
G	15	Zach Scott	6 ft 4 in (1.93 m)	175 lb (79 kg)	Jr	Miami, Florida
F	20	Jordan Henderson	6 ft 8 in (2.03 m)	195 lb (88 kg)	Fr	Katy, Texas
F	23	Carlos Rosario	6 ft 8 in (2.03 m)	220 lb (100 kg)	Sr	Santo Domingo, Dominican Republic
F	24	Chris Orlina	6 ft 6 in (1.98 m)	185 lb (84 kg)	Sr	Norfolk, Virginia
G	31	Colson Snider	5 ft 11 in (1.8 m)	165 lb (75 kg)	Fr	Lake Charles, Louisiana
G	45	Ra'Shawn Langston	6 ft 3 in (1.91 m)	200 lb (91 kg)	Sr	Little Rock, Arkansas
G		Harwin Francois	6 ft 4 in (1.93 m)	190 lb (86 kg)	Jr	Fort Myers, Florida

Head coach

- Heath Schroyer

Assistant coach(es)

- John Aiken
- Mike Dubose
- Jalen Courtney

Legend

- (C) Team captain
- (S) Suspended
- (I) Ineligible
- (W) Walk-on
- Injured
- Current redshirt

Roster
Last update: December 20, 2020

== Schedule and results ==
Date time, TV	Rank^{#}	Opponent^{#}	Result	Record	Site (attendance) city, state
Non-conference regular season
November 25, 2020*; 11:00 am, BTN		at Nebraska	L 55–102	0–1	Pinnacle Bank Arena; Lincoln, NE
November 30, 2020*; 6:30 pm		Bacone College	Canceled due to COVID-19 issues		Burton Coliseum; Lake Charles, LA
December 2, 2020*; 6:30 pm		Dallas Christian	W 140–37	1–1	Burton Coliseum (353); Lake Charles, LA
December 4, 2020*; 6:30 pm, ESPN+		at Stephen F. Austin	L 76–86	1–2	William R. Johnson Coliseum; Nacogdoches, TX
December 11, 2020*; 6:30 pm		Campbellsville	Canceled due to COVID-19 issues		Burton Coliseum; Lake Charles, LA
December 12, 2020*; 6:30 pm		Carver	W 96–53	2–2	Burton Coliseum (366); Lake Charles, LA
December 14, 2020*; 6:30 pm		Arlington Baptist	W 110–64	3–2	Burton Coliseum (240); Lake Charles, LA
December 15, 2020*; 6:30 pm		Arlington Baptist	W 114–50	4–2	Burton Coliseum (244); Lake Charles, LA
December 18, 2020*; 6:00 pm, ESPN+		at Austin Peay	Canceled due to COVID-19 issues		Dunn Center; Clarksville, TN
December 19, 2020*; 7:00 pm, ESPN+		at Louisiana	L 65–75	4–3	Cajundome (314); Lafayette, LA
December 29, 2020*; 6:30 pm		Champion Christian	W 94–36	5–3	Burton Coliseum (377); Lake Charles, LA
December 30, 2020*; 6:30 pm		Champion Christian	W 91–76	6–3	Burton Coliseum (311); Lake Charles, LA
Southland regular season
January 2, 2021; 4:00 pm		Central Arkansas	L 67–81	6–4 (0–1)	Burton Coliseum (477); Lake Charles, LA
January 9, 2021; 4:00 pm		Northwestern State	L 75–78	6–5 (0–2)	Burton Coliseum (535); Lake Charles, LA
January 13, 2021		at Incarnate Word	L 61–63	6–6 (0–3)	McDermott Center (176); San Antonio, TX
January 16, 2021; 6:00 pm		at New Orleans	L 84–99	6–7 (0–4)	Lakefront Arena (486); New Orleans, LA
January 20, 2021; 6:30 pm		Southeastern Louisiana	L 88–92	6–8 (0–5)	Burton Coliseum (261); Lake Charles, LA
January 23, 2021; 7:00 pm		at Houston Baptist	W 74–71	7–8 (1–5)	Sharp Gymnasium (140); Houston, TX
January 27, 2021; 7:00 pm		at Nicholls	L 69–76	7–9 (1–6)	Stopher Gymnasium (230); Thibodaux, LA
January 30, 2021; 4:30 pm, ESPN+		at Lamar	L 56–64	7–10 (1–7)	Montagne Center (2,359); Thibodaux, LA
February 6, 2021; 4:00 pm		at Central Arkansas	W 80–70	8–10 (2–7)	Farris Center (486); Conway, AR
February 13, 2021; 3:00 pm, ESPN+		at Northwestern State	L 66–69	8–11 (2–8)	Prather Coliseum (602); Natchitoches, LA
February 17, 2021; 6:30 pm		Incarnate Word	Postponed due to weather		Burton Coliseum; Lake Charles, LA
February 20, 2021; 4:00 pm		New Orleans	Postponed due to weather		Burton Coliseum; Lake Charles, LA
February 24, 2021; 7:00 pm		at Southeastern Louisiana	W 95–91	9–11 (3–8)	University Center (511); Hammond, LA
February 27, 2021; 7:30 pm		Houston Baptist	W 85–58	10–11 (4–8)	Burton Coliseum (291); Lake Charles, LA
March 4, 2021; 6:30 pm		Nicholls	L 67–80	10–12 (4–9)	Burton Coliseum (255); Lake Charles, LA
March 6, 2021; 4:00 pm		Lamar	L 51–60	10–13 (4–10)	Burton Coliseum; Lake Charles, LA
Southland tournament
March 9, 2021; 5:00 pm, ESPN+	(9)	vs. (8) Southeastern Louisiana; First round	L 68–71	10–14	Merrell Center; Katy, TX
*Non-conference game. ^{#}Rankings from AP Poll. (#) Tournament seedings in parentheses. All times are in Central.
