= 2020–21 Abilene Christian Wildcats men's basketball team =

American college basketball season

2020–21 Abilene Christian Wildcats men's basketball

Southland tournament champions Gulf Coast Showcase champions

NCAA tournament, Second Round
- Conference: Southland Conference
- Record: 24–5 (13–2 Southland)
- Head coach: Joe Golding (10th season)
- Associate head coach: Brette Tanner
- Assistant coaches: Antonio Bostic; Jon Trilli
- Home arena: Teague Special Events Center

2020–21 Southland Conference men's basketball standings
	Conf.				Overall
Team	W		L	PCT	W		L	PCT
Nicholls	14	–	2	.875	18	–	7	.720
Abilene Christian †	13	–	2	.867	24	–	5	.828
Sam Houston State	13	–	3	.813	19	–	9	.679
Stephen F. Austin*	12	–	3	.800	16	–	5	.762
Northwestern State	9	–	7	.563	11	–	18	.379
New Orleans	8	–	7	.533	10	–	15	.400
Lamar	6	–	10	.375	10	–	18	.357
Incarnate Word	5	–	9	.357	8	–	14	.364
Southeastern Louisiana	5	–	10	.333	8	–	18	.308
McNeese State	4	–	10	.286	10	–	14	.417
Houston Baptist	4	–	11	.267	6	–	19	.240
Central Arkansas	4	–	12	.250	5	–	19	.208
Texas A&M–CC	2	–	13	.133	5	–	19	.208
† 2021 Southland tournament winner *Ineligible for postseason due to postseason ban

The 2020–21 Abilene Christian Wildcats men's basketball team represented Abilene Christian University (ACU) in the 2020–21 NCAA Division I men's basketball season. The Wildcats, led by tenth-year head coach Joe Golding, were members of the Southland Conference. Due to renovations at their usual home arena of Moody Coliseum in Abilene, Texas, they played their home games on temporary stands and court set up on the indoor tennis courts of the Teague Special Events Center.

This was the Wildcats' final season in the Southland Conference. ACU and three other schools from Texas will leave that league on July 1, 2021 to join the Western Athletic Conference. The Wildcats finished the season 24–5, 13–2 in Southland play, to finish in second place. They defeated Lamar and Nicholls to be champions of the Southland tournament. They received the conference's automatic bid to the NCAA tournament where they upset Texas in the first round before losing in the second round to UCLA.

== Previous season ==
The Wildcats finished the 2019–20 season 20–11, 15–5 in Southland play, to finish in a tie for second place. As the No. 2 seed, they received a double-bye to the semifinals of the Southland tournament; however, the tournament was cancelled amid the COVID-19 pandemic.

== Roster ==
2020–21 Abilene Christian Wildcats men's basketball team
Players
Coaches

Pos.	#	Name	Height	Weight	Year	Hometown
G	1	Logan McLaughlin	6 ft 1 in (1.85 m)	185 lb (84 kg)	Fr	Carrollton, TX
F	3	Airion Simmons	6 ft 5 in (1.96 m)	264 lb (120 kg)	So	Little Rock, AR
G	4	Damien Daniels	5 ft 7 in (1.7 m)	140 lb (64 kg)	Jr	Kansas City, MO
F	5	Cameron Steele	6 ft 8 in (2.03 m)	205 lb (93 kg)	Fr	Excelsior, MN
F	10	Reggie Miller	6 ft 0 in (1.83 m)	150 lb (68 kg)	Sr	Houston, TX
G	11	Tobias Cameron	6 ft 5 in (1.96 m)	210 lb (95 kg)	RS Jr	Gold Coast, Australia
G	12	Mahki Morris	6 ft 3 in (1.91 m)	184 lb (83 kg)	Sr	Philadelphia, PA
G	13	Payton Brooks	6 ft 2 in (1.88 m)	193 lb (88 kg)	Fr	Abilene, TX
G	15	Immanuel Allen	6 ft 4 in (1.93 m)	215 lb (98 kg)	RS So	Lake Oswego, OR
G	20	Coryon Mason	6 ft 0 in (1.83 m)	190 lb (86 kg)	Sr	Oklahoma City, OK
F	21	Jameson Richardson	6 ft 8 in (2.03 m)	230 lb (104 kg)	Fr	Duke, OK
F	32	Joe Pleasant	6 ft 8 in (2.03 m)	220 lb (100 kg)	Jr	Overland Park, KS
G	33	Paul Hiepler	6 ft 4 in (1.93 m)	190 lb (86 kg)	Sr	Camarillo, CA
C	34	Kolton Kohl	7 ft 0 in (2.13 m)	240 lb (109 kg)	RS Sr	San Angelo, TX
F	42	Clay Gayman	6 ft 6 in (1.98 m)	220 lb (100 kg)	Jr	Nevada, MO

Head coach

- Joe Golding (Abilene Christian)

Assistant coach(es)

- Brette Tanner (Emporia State)
- Antonio Bostic (Stephen F. Austin)
- Jon Trilli (Midwestern State)

Legend

- (C) Team captain
- (S) Suspended
- (I) Ineligible
- (W) Walk-on
- Injured
- Current redshirt

Roster
Last update: December 6, 2020

== Schedule and results ==
Date time, TV	Rank^{#}	Opponent^{#}	Result	Record	Site (attendance) city, state
Non-conference regular season
November 25, 2020*; 10:00 a.m., FloHoops		vs. East Tennessee State; Gulf Coast Showcase	W 70–47	1–0	Hertz Arena (50); Estero, FL
November 27, 2020*; 1:00 p.m., FloHoops		vs. Austin Peay; Gulf Coast Showcase	W 80–72	2–0	Hertz Arena (50); Estero, FL
November 28, 2020*; 10:00 a.m., FloHoops		vs. Omaha; Gulf Coast Showcase	W 70–58	3–0	Hertz Arena (50); Estero, FL
December 1, 2020*; 7:30 p.m., ESPN+		Howard Payne; West Texas Classic	W 81–51	4–0	Teague Special Events Center (212); Abilene, TX
December 5, 2020*; 7:00 p.m., ESPN+		Tarleton State; West Texas Classic	W 69–48	5–0	Teague Special Events Center (296); Abilene, TX
December 9, 2020*; 6:00 p.m., ESPN+		at No. 17 Texas Tech	L 44–51	5–1	United Supermarkets Arena (4,175); Lubbock, TX
December 12, 2020*; 7:00 p.m., ESPN+		McMurry	W 83–46	6–1	Teague Special Events Center (210); Abilene, TX
December 16, 2020*; 7:00 p.m., ESPN+		Hardin–Simmons	W 95–73	7–1	Teague Special Events Center (228); Abilene, TX
December 22, 2020*; 4:00 p.m., SECN		at Arkansas	L 72–85	7–2	Bud Walton Arena (4,110); Fayetteville, AR
December 29, 2020*; 7:00 p.m.		Dallas Christian	W 82–44	8–2	Teague Special Events Center (194); Abilene, TX
Southland regular season
January 2, 2021; 3:00 p.m., ESPN+		Lamar	W 83–65	9–2 (1–0)	Teague Special Events Center (245); Abilene, TX
January 6, 2021; 7:00 p.m.		at Houston Baptist	W 66–63	10–2 (2–0)	Sharp Gymnasium (140); Houston, TX
January 9, 2021; 3:30 p.m.		at Texas A&M–Corpus Christi	Postponed due to COVID-19 issues		American Bank Center; Corpus Christi, TX
January 16, 2021; 3:00 p.m., ESPN+		Southeastern Louisiana	W 76–42	11–2 (3–0)	Teague Special Events Center (332); Abilene, TX
January 20, 2021; 8:30 p.m., ESPN+		at Sam Houston State	L 57–64	11–3 (3–1)	Bernard Johnson Coliseum (707); Huntsville, TX
January 23, 2021; 3:00 p.m., ESPN+		Central Arkansas	W 93–58	12–3 (4–1)	Teague Special Events Center (411); Abilene, TX
January 27, 2021; 7:30 p.m., ESPN+		Stephen F. Austin	W 82–62	13–3 (5–1)	Teague Special Events Center (382); Abilene, TX
January 30, 2021; 6:30 p.m.		at Incarnate Word	W 75–67	14–3 (6–1)	McDermott Center (176); San Antonio, TX
February 1, 2021; 7:00 p.m.		at Texas A&M–Corpus Christi; Rescheduled from January 9	Postponed due to COVID-19 issues		American Bank Center; Corpus Christi, TX
February 6, 2021; 4:30 p.m.		at Lamar	W 77–62	15–3 (7–1)	Montagne Center (1,239); Beaumont, TX
February 8, 2021; 7:00 p.m.		at Texas A&M–Corpus Christi; Rescheduled from February 1	W 82–69	16–3 (8–1)	American Bank Center (464); Corpus Christi, TX
February 10, 2021; 7:00 p.m., ESPN+		Houston Baptist	W 88–59	17–3 (9–1)	Teague Special Events Center (294); Abilene, TX
February 13, 2021; 7:30 p.m., ESPN+		Texas A&M–Corpus Christi	W 83–55	18–3 (10–1)	Teague Special Events Center (416); Abilene, TX
February 20, 2021; 4:00 p.m.		at Southeastern Louisiana	Canceled due to weather		University Center; Hammond, LA
February 24, 2021; 7:30 p.m., ESPN+		Sam Houston State	W 86–72	19–3 (11–1)	Teague Special Events Center (507); Abilene, TX
February 27, 2021; 7:00 p.m., ESPN+		at Central Arkansas	L 82–84	19–4 (11–2)	Farris Center (489); Conway, AR
March 3, 2021; 8:00 p.m., ESPN+		at Stephen F. Austin	W 63–61	20–4 (12–2)	William R. Johnson Coliseum (1,636); Nacogdoches, TX
March 6, 2021; 3:00 p.m., ESPN+		Incarnate Word	W 85–60	21–4 (13–2)	Teague Special Events Center; Abilene, TX
Southland tournament
March 12, 2021; 8:00 p.m., ESPN+	(2)	vs. (6) Lamar; Semifinals	W 93–71	22–4	Merrell Center (1,050); Katy, TX
March 13, 2021; 8:30 p.m., ESPN2	(2)	vs. (1) Nicholls; Championship	W 79–45	23–4	Merrell Center (1,205); Katy, TX
NCAA tournament
March 20, 2021; 8:50 p.m., truTV, TNT (Note: The game against Texas, which was originally scheduled to air exclusively on truTV, was simulcasted on TNT after the Oregon–VCU game, which was scheduled to air on the latter network around the same time, was cancelled due to VCU having to withdraw from the tournament due to COVID-19 protocols.)	(14 E)	vs. (3 E) No. 9 Texas; First round	W 53–52	24–4	Lucas Oil Stadium; Indianapolis, IN
March 22, 2021; 4:15 p.m., TBS	(14 E)	vs. (11 E) UCLA; Second round	L 47–67	24–5	Bankers Life Fieldhouse; Indianapolis, IN
*Non-conference game. ^{#}Rankings from AP poll. (#) Tournament seedings in parentheses. All times are in Central.
