= 2020–21 Stephen F. Austin Lumberjacks basketball team =

American college basketball season

2020–21 Stephen F. Austin Lumberjacks basketball
- Conference: Southland Conference
- Record: 16–5 (12–3 Southland)
- Head coach: Kyle Keller (5th season)
- Assistant coaches: Jeremy Cox; Wade Mason; Mitch Vanya
- Home arena: William R. Johnson Coliseum (Capacity: 7,203)

2020–21 Southland Conference men's basketball standings
	Conf.				Overall
Team	W		L	PCT	W		L	PCT
Nicholls	14	–	2	.875	18	–	7	.720
Abilene Christian †	13	–	2	.867	24	–	5	.828
Sam Houston State	13	–	3	.813	19	–	9	.679
Stephen F. Austin*	12	–	3	.800	16	–	5	.762
Northwestern State	9	–	7	.563	11	–	18	.379
New Orleans	8	–	7	.533	10	–	15	.400
Lamar	6	–	10	.375	10	–	18	.357
Incarnate Word	5	–	9	.357	8	–	14	.364
Southeastern Louisiana	5	–	10	.333	8	–	18	.308
McNeese State	4	–	10	.286	10	–	14	.417
Houston Baptist	4	–	11	.267	6	–	19	.240
Central Arkansas	4	–	12	.250	5	–	19	.208
Texas A&M–CC	2	–	13	.133	5	–	19	.208
† 2021 Southland tournament winner *Ineligible for postseason due to postseason ban

The 2020–21 Stephen F. Austin Lumberjacks basketball team represented Stephen F. Austin State University (SFA) during the 2020–21 NCAA Division I men's basketball season. The Lumberjacks, led by fifth-year head coach Kyle Keller, played home games at the William R. Johnson Coliseum in Nacogdoches, Texas. This season was the Lumberjacks' last as members of the Southland Conference; SFA is one of four schools, all from Texas, that will leave the Southland in July 2021 to join the Western Athletic Conference.

== Previous season ==
The 2019–20 Stephen F. Austin Lumberjacks basketball team finished the season 28–3, 19–1 in Southland play to win the Southland regular season championship. As the No. 1 seed, they received a double-bye to the semifinals of the Southland tournament, however, the tournament was cancelled amid the COVID-19 pandemic. With the Southland tournament's cancellation, they were awarded the Southland's automatic bid to the NCAA tournament, however, the NCAA tournament was also cancelled due to the same outbreak.

== Roster ==
2020–21 Stephen F. Austin Lumberjacks men's basketball team
Players
Coaches

Pos.	#	Name	Height	Weight	Year	Hometown
G	1	DeAndre Heckard	6 ft 1 in (1.85 m)	173 lb (78 kg)	Jr	Romeoville, Illinois
G	2	Roti Ware	6 ft 3 in (1.91 m)	187 lb (85 kg)	Sr	Morton, Mississippi
F	3	Cameron Johnson	6 ft 4 in (1.93 m)	216 lb (98 kg)	Sr	Little Rock, Arkansas
G	4	David Kachelries	6 ft 1 in (1.85 m)	170 lb (77 kg)	Sr	Emmaus, Pennsylvania
G	5	Jaylin Jackson-Posey	6 ft 2 in (1.88 m)	196 lb (89 kg)	Fr	Midland, Texas
G	10	Elijah Elliott	6 ft 3 in (1.91 m)	182 lb (83 kg)	So	Southlake, Texas
G	11	Nigel Hawkins	6 ft 4 in (1.93 m)	191 lb (87 kg)	Jr	Houston, Texas
F	12	Charlie Daniels	6 ft 9 in (2.06 m)	222 lb (101 kg)	Sr	Jacksonville, Florida
F	13	Calvin Solomon	6 ft 7 in (2.01 m)	194 lb (88 kg)	So	Houston, Texas
F	14	Gavin Kensmil	6 ft 7 in (2.01 m)	260 lb (118 kg)	Sr	Paramaribo, Suriname
G	15	Kharee McDaniel	5 ft 10 in (1.78 m)	173 lb (78 kg)	RS Fr	Houston, Texas
G	21	Russell Hyman	6 ft 1 in (1.85 m)	168 lb (76 kg)	Fr	Southlake, Texas
F	22	Nana Antwi-Boasiako	6 ft 9 in (2.06 m)	220 lb (100 kg)	Fr	Nacogdoches, Texas
F	35	Demiere Brown	6 ft 6 in (1.98 m)	260 lb (118 kg)	RS Jr	Powder Springs, Georgia

Head coach

- Kyle Keller (Louisiana Tech)

Assistant coach(es)

- Jeremy Cox (Colorado Mesa)
- Desmond Haymon (Stephen F. Austin)
- Mitch Vanya (Texas A&M)

Legend

- (C) Team captain
- (S) Suspended
- (I) Ineligible
- (W) Walk-on
- Injured
- Current redshirt

Roster
Last update: December 7, 2020

== Schedule ==
Date time, TV	Rank^{#}	Opponent^{#}	Result	Record	Site (attendance) city, state
Non-conference Regular season
December 1, 2020*; 6:30 pm, ESPN+		LeTourneau	W 102–57	1–0	William R. Johnson Coliseum (1,288); Nacogdoches, TX
December 4, 2020*; 6:30 pm, ESPN+		McNeese State	W 86–76	2–0	William R. Johnson Coliseum; Nacogdoches, TX
December 6, 2020*; 4:00 pm, ESPN+		LSU–Alexandria	W 97–79	3–0	William R. Johnson Coliseum (250); Nacogdoches, TX
December 9, 2020*; 7:00 pm, ESPN+		at No. 2 Baylor	L 52–83	3–1	Ferrell Center (2,350); Waco, TX
December 12, 2020*; 6:30 pm, ESPN+		at Louisiana–Monroe	L 55–66	3–2	Fant–Ewing Coliseum (638); Monroe, LA
December 16, 2020*; 6:30 pm		Arkansas State	Canceled due to COVID-19 issues		William R. Johnson Coliseum; Nacogdoches, TX
December 18, 2020*; 6:30 pm		LSU–Shreveport	Canceled due to COVID-19 issues		William R. Johnson Coliseum; Nacogdoches, TX
December 21, 2020*; 5:00 pm		Southeastern Louisiana	Canceled due to COVID-19 issues		William R. Johnson Coliseum; Nacogdoches, TX
December 22, 2020*; 3:00 pm		Paul Quinn	Canceled due to COVID-19 issues		William R. Johnson Coliseum; Nacogdoches, TX
Southland Regular season
January 2, 2021; 4:30 pm, ESPN+		New Orleans	W 78–67	4–2 (1–0)	William R. Johnson Coliseum (1,035); Nacogdoches, TX
January 6, 2021; 7:00 pm		at Texas A&M–Corpus Christi	Postponed due to COVID-19 issues		American Bank Center; Corpus Christi, TX
January 8, 2021*; 6:30 pm, ESPN+		Midwestern State	W 87–71	5–2	William R. Johnson Coliseum; Nacogdoches, TX
January 13, 2021; 6:30 pm, ESPN+		Central Arkansas	W 95–69	6–2 (2–0)	William R. Johnson Coliseum (1,089); Nacogdoches, TX
January 16, 2021; 4:30 pm		at Incarnate Word	W 83–65	7–2 (3–0)	McDermott Center (176); San Antonio, TX
January 20, 2021; 6:30 pm, ESPN+		Northwestern State	W 86–74	8–2 (4–0)	William R. Johnson Coliseum (1,297); Nacogdoches, TX
January 23, 2021; 4:30 pm, ESPN+		Lamar	W 102–72	9–2 (5–0)	William R. Johnson Coliseum (2,311); Nacogdoches, TX
January 27, 2021; 8:00 pm, ESPN+		at Abilene Christian	L 62–82	9–3 (5–1)	Teague Special Events Center (382); Abilene, TX
January 31, 2021; 3:00 pm, ESPNU		Sam Houston State	W 78–68	10–3 (6–1)	William R. Johnson Coliseum (1,989); Nacogdoches, TX
February 3, 2021; 6:00 pm, ESPN+		at Texas A&M–Corpus Christi rescheduled from January 6	W 84–75	11–3 (7–1)	American Bank Center (699); Corpus Christi, TX
February 6, 2021; 6:00 pm, ESPN+		at New Orleans	Postponed due to COVID-19 issues		Lakefront Arena; New Orleans, LA
February 10, 2021; 6:30 pm, ESPN+		Texas A&M–Corpus Christi	W 80–68	12–3 (8–1)	William R. Johnson Coliseum; Nacogdoches, TX
February 15, 2021; 3:00 pm, ESPN+		at New Orleans rescheduled from February 6	W 89–79	13–3 (9–1)	Lakefront Arena (500); New Orleans, LA
February 17, 2021; 6:30 pm		at Central Arkansas	Postponed due to weather		Farris Center; Conway, AR
February 20, 2021; 4:30 pm		Incarnate Word	Canceled due to weather		William R. Johnson Coliseum; Nacogdoches, TX
February 24, 2021; 6:30 pm		at Northwestern State	W 83–57	14–3 (10–1)	Prather Coliseum (1,086); Natchitoches, LA
February 27, 2021; 4:30 pm, ESPN+		at Lamar	L 83–88	14–4 (10–2)	Montagne Center (1,112); Beaumont, TX
March 1, 2021; 3:00 pm		at Central Arkansas rescheduled from February 17	W 79–66	15–4 (11–2)	Farris Center (297); Conway, AR
March 3, 2021; 8:00 pm, ESPN+		Abilene Christian	L 61–63	15–5 (11–3)	William R. Johnson Coliseum (1,636); Nacogdoches, TX
March 6, 2021; 5:00 pm		at Sam Houston State	W 64–59	16–5 (12–3)	Bernard Johnson Coliseum (1,215); Huntsville, TX
*Non-conference game. ^{#}Rankings from AP Poll. (#) Tournament seedings in parentheses. All times are in Central Time.
