= 2020–21 Southeastern Louisiana Lions basketball team =

American college basketball season

2020–21 Southeastern Louisiana Lions basketball
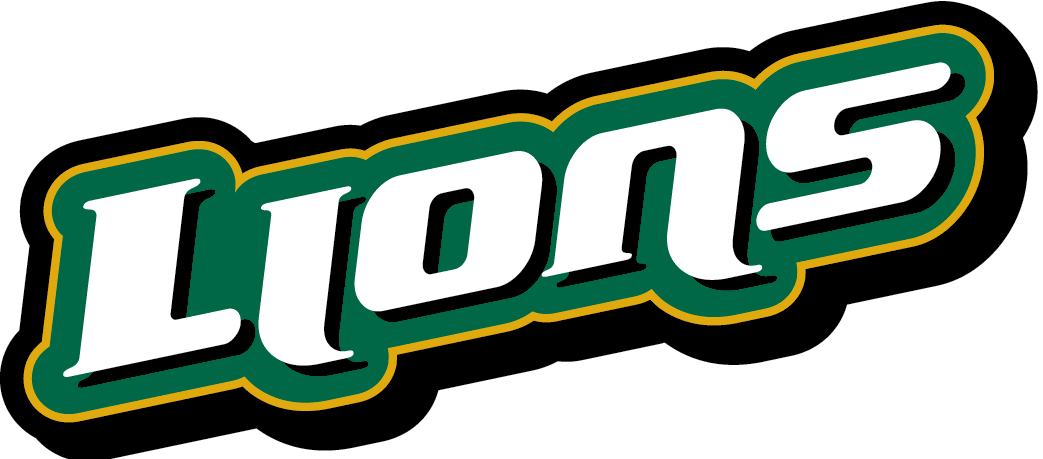
- Conference: Southland Conference
- Record: 8–18 (5–10 Southland)
- Head coach: David Kiefer (2nd season)
- Assistant coaches: Mark Lieberman; Jordan Brooks; Riley Conroy
- Home arena: University Center (Capacity: 7,500)

2020–21 Southland Conference men's basketball standings
	Conf.				Overall
Team	W		L	PCT	W		L	PCT
Nicholls	14	–	2	.875	18	–	7	.720
Abilene Christian †	13	–	2	.867	24	–	5	.828
Sam Houston State	13	–	3	.813	19	–	9	.679
Stephen F. Austin*	12	–	3	.800	16	–	5	.762
Northwestern State	9	–	7	.563	11	–	18	.379
New Orleans	8	–	7	.533	10	–	15	.400
Lamar	6	–	10	.375	10	–	18	.357
Incarnate Word	5	–	9	.357	8	–	14	.364
Southeastern Louisiana	5	–	10	.333	8	–	18	.308
McNeese State	4	–	10	.286	10	–	14	.417
Houston Baptist	4	–	11	.267	6	–	19	.240
Central Arkansas	4	–	12	.250	5	–	19	.208
Texas A&M–CC	2	–	13	.133	5	–	19	.208
† 2021 Southland tournament winner *Ineligible for postseason due to postseason ban

The 2020–21 Southeastern Louisiana Lions basketball team represented Southeastern Louisiana University during the 2020–21 NCAA Division I men's basketball season. The Lions were led by second-year head coach David Kiefer, and played their home games at the University Center in Hammond, Louisiana as members of the Southland Conference. In a season limited due to the ongoing COVID-19 pandemic, the Lions finished the 2020–21 season 8–18, 5–10 in Southland play to finish in ninth place. They defeated McNeese State in the first round of the Southland tournament before losing to New Orleans.

== Previous season ==
The Lions finished the 2019–20 season 8–23, 5–15 in Southland play to finish in a tie for 11th place. They failed to qualify for the Southland tournament.

== Roster ==
2020–21 Southeastern Louisiana Lions men's basketball team
Players
Coaches

Pos.	#	Name	Height	Weight	Year	Hometown
F	0	Elijah Ifejah	6 ft 9 in (2.06 m)	240 lb (109 kg)	Sr	Montreal, Quebec, Canada
G	1	Avery Wilson	6 ft 4 in (1.93 m)	225 lb (102 kg)	Jr	Forest Park, Georgia
G	2	Isiah Kirby	6 ft 4 in (1.93 m)	195 lb (88 kg)	So	Fort Lauderdale, Florida
G	3	Maxim Romanov	6 ft 8 in (2.03 m)	200 lb (91 kg)	So	Nahariya, Israel
G	4	Keon Clergeot	6 ft 1 in (1.85 m)	190 lb (86 kg)	Sr	Winter Haven, Florida
G	5	Byron Smith	6 ft 3 in (1.91 m)	185 lb (84 kg)	So	Palatka, Florida
G	10	JonDarius Warren	6 ft 0 in (1.83 m)	190 lb (86 kg)	So	Corinth, Mississippi
F	11	McKay Howell	6 ft 7 in (2.01 m)	195 lb (88 kg)	So	Louisville, Kentucky
G	12	Matthew Strange	5 ft 11 in (1.8 m)	170 lb (77 kg)	RS Jr	The Woodlands, Texas
F	13	Pape Diop	6 ft 9 in (2.06 m)	215 lb (98 kg)	Sr	Ziguinchor, Senegal
SF	20	Brandon Gonzalez	6 ft 6 in (1.98 m)	205 lb (93 kg)	Sr	Punta Gorda, Florida
G/F	22	Nick Caldwell	6 ft 7 in (2.01 m)	215 lb (98 kg)	So	Geismar, Louisiana
G	24	Jamon Kemp	6 ft 6 in (1.98 m)	195 lb (88 kg)	Fr	Seattle, Washington
G	25	Joe Kasperzyk	6 ft 3 in (1.91 m)	190 lb (86 kg)	Jr	New Haven, Connecticut
C	33	Max Brackmann	7 ft 2 in (2.18 m)	270 lb (122 kg)	RS Fr	Löhne, Germany
G/F	35	Gus Okafor	6 ft 6 in (1.98 m)	230 lb (104 kg)	RS Jr	Baltimore, Maryland

Head coach

- David Kiefer (Kansas State)

Assistant coach(es)

- Mark Lieberman (FIU)
- Jordan Brooks (Hampton)
- Riley Conroy (Tulane)

Legend

- (C) Team captain
- (S) Suspended
- (I) Ineligible
- (W) Walk-on
- Injured
- Current redshirt

Roster
Last update: December 10, 2020

== Schedule and results ==
Date time, TV	Rank^{#}	Opponent^{#}	Result	Record	Site (attendance) city, state
Non-conference Regular season
November 25, 2020*; 6:00 pm, ESPN3		at Purdue Fort Wayne	L 63–67 ^{OT}	0–1	Hilliard Gates Sports Center; Fort Wayne, IN
November 28, 2020*; 2:00 pm		at UAB	L 59–84	0–2	Bartow Arena (709); Birmingham, AL
November 30, 2020*; 7:00 pm, SECN+		at LSU	L 43–96	0–3	Pete Maravich Assembly Center (2,008); Baton Rouge, LA
December 2, 2020*; 9:00 pm		at Cal Baptist	W 81–80	1–3	CBU Events Center; Riverside, CA
December 4, 2020*; 4:00 pm		at Cal Baptist	L 66–83	1–4	CBU Events Center; Riverside, CA
December 9, 2020*; 6:30 pm		at Louisiana Tech	L 69–78	1–5	Thomas Assembly Center (1,200); Ruston, LA
December 12, 2020*; 7:00 pm		at Missouri State	Canceled due to COVID-19 issues		JQH Arena; Springfield, MO
December 15, 2020*; 6:00 pm, SECN+		at Texas A&M	L 52–69	1–6	Reed Arena (712); College Station, TX
December 21, 2020*; 5:00 pm		at Stephen F. Austin	Canceled due to COVID-19 issues		William R. Johnson Coliseum; Nacogdoches, TX
December 23, 2020*; 7:00 pm		at Grambling State	W 77–70	2–6	Fredrick C. Hobdy Assembly Center (100); Grambling, LA
December 29, 2020*; 7:00 pm, ESPN+		at Lamar	L 64–74	2–7	Montagne Center (1,529); Beaumont, TX
Southland Regular season
January 6, 2021; 7:00 pm, ESPN+		Sam Houston State	L 52–70	2–8 (0–1)	University Center (318); Hammond, LA
January 9, 2021; 5:00 pm		at Nicholls	L 67–87	2–9 (0–2)	Stopher Gymnasium (211); Thibodaux, LA
January 13, 2021; 7:00 pm, ESPN+		Texas A&M–Corpus Christi	W 76–63	3–9 (1–2)	University Center (283); Hammond, LA
January 16, 2021; 3:00 pm, ESPN+		at Abilene Christian	L 42–76	3–10 (1–3)	Teague Special Events Center (332); Abilene, TX
January 20, 2021; 6:30 pm		at McNeese State	W 92–88	4–10 (2–3)	Burton Coliseum (261); Lake Charles, LA
January 23, 2021; 4:00 pm, ESPN+		Northwestern State	L 68–73	4–11 (2–4)	University Center (403); Hammond, LA
January 27, 2021; 8:00 pm, ESPN+		Central Arkansas	W 69–57	5–11 (3–4)	University Center (527); Hammond, LA
January 30, 2021; 4:00 pm, ESPN+		New Orleans	W 79–73	6–11 (4–4)	University Center (317); Hammond, LA
February 10, 2021; 6:30 pm, ESPN+		at Sam Houston State	L 61–79	6–12 (4–5)	Bernard Johnson Coliseum (554); Huntsville, TX
February 13, 2021; 7:00 pm, ESPN+		Nicholls	L 84–86 ^{OT}	6–13 (4–6)	University Center (531); Hammond, LA
February 17, 2021; 7:30 pm		at Texas A&M–Corpus Christi	Postponed due to weather		American Bank Center; Corpus Christi, TX
February 20, 2021; 4:00 pm, ESPN+		Abilene Christian	Canceled due to weather		University Center; Hammond, LA
February 22, 2021; 6:30 pm		at Texas A&M–Corpus Christi rescheduled from February 17	W 78–75	7–13 (5–6)	American Bank Center (633); Corpus Christi, TX
February 24, 2021; 7:00 pm, ESPN+		McNeese State	L 91–95	7–14 (5–7)	University Center (511); Hammond, LA
February 27, 2021; 3:00 pm		at Northwestern State	L 61–79	7–15 (5–8)	Prather Coliseum (504); Natchitoches, LA
March 3, 2021; 7:00 pm		at Central Arkansas	L 71–88	7–16 (5–9)	Farris Center (372); Conway, AR
March 6, 2021; 7:00 pm		at New Orleans	L 76–81 ^{OT}	7–17 (5–10)	Lakefront Arena (940); New Orleans, LA
Southland tournament
March 9, 2021; 5:00 pm, ESPN+	(8)	vs. (9) McNeese State; First round	W 71–68	8–17	Merrell Center; Katy, TX
March 10, 2021; 5:00 pm, ESPN+	(8)	vs. (5) New Orleans; Second round	L 63–80	8–18	Merrell Center; Katy, TX
*Non-conference game. ^{#}Rankings from AP Poll. (#) Tournament seedings in parentheses. All times are in Central Time.
