= 2020–21 Houston Baptist Huskies men's basketball team =

American college basketball season

2020–21 Houston Baptist Huskies men's basketball
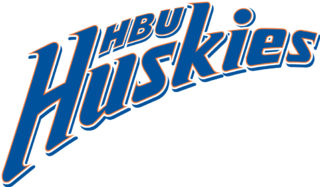
- Conference: Southland Conference
- Record: 6–19 (4–11 Southland)
- Head coach: Ron Cottrell (30th season)
- Assistant coaches: Steven Key; Jud Kinne; Keith Berard
- Home arena: Sharp Gymnasium

2020–21 Southland Conference men's basketball standings
	Conf.				Overall
Team	W		L	PCT	W		L	PCT
Nicholls	14	–	2	.875	18	–	7	.720
Abilene Christian †	13	–	2	.867	24	–	5	.828
Sam Houston State	13	–	3	.813	19	–	9	.679
Stephen F. Austin*	12	–	3	.800	16	–	5	.762
Northwestern State	9	–	7	.563	11	–	18	.379
New Orleans	8	–	7	.533	10	–	15	.400
Lamar	6	–	10	.375	10	–	18	.357
Incarnate Word	5	–	9	.357	8	–	14	.364
Southeastern Louisiana	5	–	10	.333	8	–	18	.308
McNeese State	4	–	10	.286	10	–	14	.417
Houston Baptist	4	–	11	.267	6	–	19	.240
Central Arkansas	4	–	12	.250	5	–	19	.208
Texas A&M–CC	2	–	13	.133	5	–	19	.208
† 2021 Southland tournament winner *Ineligible for postseason due to postseason ban

The 2020–21 Houston Baptist Huskies men's basketball team represented Houston Baptist University in the 2020–21 NCAA Division I men's basketball season. The Huskies, led by 30th-year head coach Ron Cottrell, played their home games at Sharp Gymnasium in Houston, Texas as members of the Southland Conference.

In a season limited due to the ongoing COVID-19 pandemic, the Huskies finished the season 6–19, 4–11 in Southland play, to finish in eleventh place. They defeated Incarnate Word in the first round of the Southland tournament before falling to Lamar in the second round.

== Previous season ==
The Huskies finished the 2019–20 season 4–25, 4–16 in Southland play, to finish in last place. They failed to qualify for the Southland tournament.

== Roster ==
2020–21 Houston Baptist Huskies men's basketball team
Players
Coaches

Pos.	#	Name	Height	Weight	Year	Hometown
G	0	Jade Tse	6 ft 1 in (1.85 m)	185 lb (84 kg)	Fr	Queens, NY
G	2	Za-Ontay Boothman	6 ft 1 in (1.85 m)	175 lb (79 kg)	Fr	Buckeye, AZ
G	3	Brycen Long	6 ft 2 in (1.88 m)	175 lb (79 kg)	Fr	Gilbert, AZ
G	4	Myles Pierre	6 ft 2 in (1.88 m)	190 lb (86 kg)	So	Charlotte, NC
G	5	Hunter Janacek	6 ft 5 in (1.96 m)	185 lb (84 kg)	RS Jr	Houston, TX
G/F	10	Ty Dalton	6 ft 4 in (1.93 m)	215 lb (98 kg)	Sr	Houston, TX
F	11	Jason Thompson	6 ft 7 in (2.01 m)	195 lb (88 kg)	So	Charlotte, NC
F	13	Philip McKenzie	6 ft 5 in (1.96 m)	205 lb (93 kg)	Sr	Nassau, the Bahamas
G	14	Andre Jr. Charles	6 ft 0 in (1.83 m)	170 lb (77 kg)	Jr	Houston, TX
G/F	21	Pedro Castro	6 ft 6 in (1.98 m)	185 lb (84 kg)	Jr	Fort Worth, TX
G/F	23	Darius Lee	6 ft 6 in (1.98 m)	230 lb (104 kg)	Jr	Harlem, NY
F	24	Cameron Hart	6 ft 7 in (2.01 m)	215 lb (98 kg)	Jr	Lufkin, TX
G/F	25	Collin Plummer	6 ft 5 in (1.96 m)	175 lb (79 kg)	Fr	Missouri City, TX
C	34	Zach Iyeyemi	6 ft 9 in (2.06 m)	250 lb (113 kg)	So	Cypress, TX
C	50	Ryan Gomes	6 ft 10 in (2.08 m)	250 lb (113 kg)	Sr	Westminster, MD
G/F	55	Joshua Nkwo	6 ft 2 in (1.88 m)	205 lb (93 kg)	Fr	Hamilton, ON

Head coach

- Ron Cottrell (Arkansas)

Assistant coach(es)

- Steven Key (Houston Baptist)
- Jud Kinne (Albion)
- Keith Berard (Southern Utah)

Legend

- (C) Team captain
- (S) Suspended
- (I) Ineligible
- (W) Walk-on
- Injured
- Current redshirt

Roster
Last update: December 10, 2020

== Schedule and results ==
Date time, TV	Rank^{#}	Opponent^{#}	Result	Record	Site (attendance) city, state
Non-conference regular season
November 25, 2020*; 7:00 p.m., ESPN+		at TCU	L 45–69	0–1	Schollmaier Arena (1,672); Fort Worth, TX
November 29, 2020*; 3:00 p.m., P12N		at No. 18 Arizona State	L 77–100	0–2	Desert Financial Arena; Tempe, AZ
December 2, 2020*; 7:00 p.m., ESPN+		at SMU	L 75–102	0–3	Moody Coliseum (1,507); University Park, TX
December 5, 2020*; 7:00 p.m.		Rice	L 64–86	0–4	Sharp Gymnasium (150); Houston, TX
December 11, 2020*; 7:00 p.m.		Champion Christian	W 93–60	1–4	Sharp Gymnasium (109); Houston, TX
December 15, 2020*; 2:00 p.m.		at Rice	L 79–90	1–5	Tudor Fieldhouse; Houston, TX
December 17, 2020*; 7:00 p.m.		at North Texas	L 55–85	1–6	The Super Pit (1,251); Denton, TX
December 19, 2020*; 7:00 p.m., FSSW		at Oklahoma	L 65–84	1–7	Lloyd Noble Center (611); Norman, OK
December 30, 2020*; 7:00 p.m.		Dallas Christian	Canceled due to COVID-19 issues		Sharp Gymnasium; Houston, TX
Southland regular season
January 2, 2021; 7:00 p.m.		Northwestern State	W 99–93 ^{OT}	2–7 (1–0)	Sharp Gymnasium (101); Houston, TX
January 6, 2021; 7:00 p.m.		Abilene Christian	L 63–66	2–8 (1–1)	Sharp Gymnasium (140); Houston, TX
January 9, 2020; 2:00 p.m.		at Lamar	L 65–71	2–9 (1–2)	Montagne Center (1,632); Beaumont, TX
January 16, 2021; 5:00 p.m.		at Sam Houston State	L 80–87	2–10 (1–3)	Bernard Johnson Coliseum (695); Huntsville, TX
January 20, 2021; 7:00 p.m.		Nicholls	L 83–92	2–11 (1–4)	Sharp Gymnasium (140); Houston, TX
January 23, 2021; 7:00 p.m.		McNeese State	L 71–74	2–12 (1–5)	Sharp Gymnasium (140); Houston, TX
January 27, 2021; 7:00 p.m.		at Incarnate Word	W 73–57	3–12 (2–5)	McDermott Center (176); San Antonio, TX
January 30, 2021; 3:30 p.m.		at Texas A&M–Corpus Christi	Postponed due to COVID-19 issues		American Bank Center; Corpus Christi, TX
February 6, 2021; 3:00 p.m.		at Northwestern State	Postponed due to COVID-19 issues		Prather Coliseum; Natchitoches, LA
February 10, 2021; 7:00 p.m., ESPN+		at Abilene Christian	L 59–88	3–13 (2–6)	Teague Special Events Center (294); Abilene, TX
February 13, 2021; 7:00 p.m.		Lamar	W 80–75	4–13 (3–6)	Sharp Gymnasium; Houston, TX
February 15, 2021; 7:00 p.m.		at Texas A&M–Corpus Christi rescheduled from January 30	Canceled due to weather		American Bank Center; Corpus Christi, TX
February 20, 2021; 7:00 p.m.		Sam Houston State	Postponed due to weather		Sharp Gymnasium; Houston, TX
February 22, 2021; 6:30 p.m.		at Northwestern State; Rescheduled from February 6	L 80–86	4–14 (3–7)	Prather Coliseum (725); Natchitoches, LA
February 24, 2021; 7:00 p.m.		at Nicholls	L 68–83	4–15 (3–8)	Stopher Gymnasium (231); Thibodaux, LA
February 27, 2021; 4:00 p.m.		at McNeese State	L 58–85	4–16 (3–9)	Burton Coliseum (291); Lake Charles, LA
March 1, 2021; 7:00 p.m.		Sam Houston State; Rescheduled from February 20	L 70–83	4–17 (3–10)	Sharp Gymnasium (140); Houston, TX
March 3, 2021; 7:00 p.m.		Incarnate Word	W 72–67	5–17 (4–10)	Sharp Gymnasium (140); Houston, TX
March 6, 2021; 5:00 p.m.		Texas A&M–Corpus Christi	L 70–94	5–18 (4–11)	Sharp Gymnasium (140); Houston, TX
Southland tournament
March 9, 2021; 8:00 p.m., ESPN+	(10)	vs. (7) Incarnate Word; First round	W 80–68	6–18	Merrell Center (416); Katy, TX
March 10, 2021; 8:00 p.m., ESPN+	(10)	vs. (6) Lamar; Second round	L 52–62	6–19	Merrell Center (554); Katy, TX
*Non-conference game. ^{#}Rankings from AP poll. (#) Tournament seedings in parentheses. All times are in Central.
