= Joe Golding (basketball) =

American basketball coach (born 1975)

Current position
- Title: Head coach
- Team: UTEP
- Conference: Mountain West
- Record: 84–84 (.500)

Biographical details
- Born: October 15, 1975 (age 51); Wichita Falls, Texas, U.S.

Playing career
- 1994–1998: Abilene Christian
- Position: Guard

Coaching career (HC unless noted)
- 2000–2001: South Garland HS (assistant)
- 2001–2002: Seminole JC (assistant)
- 2002–2004: Sachse HS
- 2004–2005: Collin County CC (assistant)
- 2005–2008: Abilene Christian (assistant)
- 2008–2011: Arkansas–Little Rock (assistant)
- 2011–2021: Abilene Christian
- 2021–present: UTEP

Head coaching record
- Overall: 242–228 (.515) (college); 33–24 (.579) (high school)
- Tournaments: 1–2 (NCAA Division I); 0–1 (CIT); 1–1 (TBC)

Accomplishments and honors

Championships
- 2× Southland tournament (2019, 2021)

Awards
- Southland Coach of the Year (2019)

Joseph Charles Golding (born October 15, 1975) is an American basketball coach and former player. He is currently the head men's basketball coach at the University of Texas at El Paso, having previously served in the same capacity at Abilene Christian University, where he played point guard from 1994 to 1998.

== Early years ==
Golding grew up in Midland, Texas, before relocating with his family as a teenager to Wichita Falls, Texas, where he graduated from Wichita Falls High School. He then played varsity basketball at Abilene Christian, earning four letters from 1994 to 1998, and graduated from ACU in 1999.

== Coaching career ==
The beginning of Golding's career was spent at the high school and junior college levels, with assistant coaching positions at South Garland High School, Seminole State College and Collin College. His first head coaching job came in 2002 when, at age 27, he was hired to lead the program at Sachse High School.

In 2005, he was hired as an assistant coach at his alma mater, Abilene Christian, spending three seasons with the Wildcats before joining the coaching staff under Steve Shields at the University of Arkansas at Little Rock in 2008. During his final season in Little Rock, Golding helped lead the Trojans to a championship in the Sun Belt Conference tournament and a berth in the 2011 NCAA tournament.

=== Abilene Christian ===
Golding's first head coaching job was at his alma mater, when he was hired to lead the program at Abilene Christian in 2011 at age 36. The difficulty of his first two losing seasons with the Wildcats in the Division II Lone Star Conference was compounded when ACU accepted an invitation to join the Southland Conference and make the transition to playing NCAA Division I basketball.

After the transition to Division I, Golding and the Wildcats endured four more losing seasons before making their first postseason appearance with a berth in the CIT following the 2017–2018 season. The next year, the Wildcats won 27 games, captured the title at the Southland Conference tournament and earned the school's first-ever invitation to the NCAA tournament, where they lost to Kentucky in the first round.

While the Wildcats' second consecutive 20-win season in 2019–20 did not produce a postseason appearance because of the COVID-19 pandemic, they returned to the Big Dance in 2021 by winning their second Southland Conference tournament title. As the 14th seed in the East Regional, ACU entered the 2021 NCAA tournament as a heavy underdog in the first round against 3rd-seeded Texas, who had just won the Big 12 Conference tournament. Utilizing a stifling defense that forced 23 turnovers, the Wildcats shocked the Longhorns, 53–52. It was the school's first-ever NCAA Tournament victory and the first win for a 14-seed since 2016. The Wildcats' season concluded two days later, when they were defeated by eventual Final Four participant UCLA in the second round.

=== UTEP ===
On April 14, 2021, Golding was officially introduced as the 20th head men's basketball coach at UTEP in a press conference held at the Don Haskins Center in El Paso.

== Family ==
Golding's grandfather and great-uncle were brothers, both named Joe Golding, who each left their own athletic legacy. His grandfather, Joseph Lester Golding, was a longtime high school football coach who led Wichita Falls High to four state championships. The field at Wichita Falls' Memorial Stadium was named in his honor and he was posthumously elected to the Texas High School Football Hall of Fame in 1988. His great-uncle, Joseph Griffith Golding, was an All-American halfback at Oklahoma in 1946 before playing for five seasons in the NFL. His sister, Kate, is married to current TCU football coach Sonny Dykes. He and his wife, Amanda, have two sons named Chase and Cason Golding.

== Head coaching record ==
Record table
Season	Team	Overall	Conference	Standing	Postseason
Abilene Christian Wildcats (Lone Star Conference) (2011–2013)
2011–12	Abilene Christian	12–16	4–14		
2012–13	Abilene Christian	12–14	6–12		
Abilene Christian Wildcats (Southland Conference) (2013–2021)
2013–14	Abilene Christian	11–20	2–12	13th	
2014–15	Abilene Christian	10–21	4–14	12th	
2015–16	Abilene Christian	13–18	8–10	7th	
2016–17	Abilene Christian	13–16	7–11	T–8th	
2017–18	Abilene Christian	16–16	8–10	T–8th	CIT First Round
2018–19	Abilene Christian	27–7	14–4	2nd	NCAA Division I Round of 64
2019–20	Abilene Christian	20–11	15–5	T–2nd	
2020–21	Abilene Christian	24–5	13–2	2nd	NCAA Division I Round of 32
Abilene Christian:		158–144 (.523)	71–68 (.511)		
UTEP Miners (Conference USA) (2021–2026)
2021–22	UTEP	20–14	11–7	4th (West)	TBC Second Round
2022–23	UTEP	14–18	7–13	T–9th	
2023–24	UTEP	18–16	7–9	T–4th	
2024–25	UTEP	18–15	7–11	8th	
2025–26	UTEP	11–20	7–13	11th	
UTEP Miners (Mountain West Conference) (2026–present)
2026–27	UTEP	3–1	0–0		
UTEP:		84–84 (.500)	39–53 (.424)		
Total:		242–228 (.515)			
