= 2020–21 Central Arkansas Bears basketball team =

American college basketball season

2020–21 Central Arkansas Bears basketball
- Conference: Southland Conference
- Record: 5–19 (4–12 Southland)
- Head coach: Anthony Boone (1st season)
- Assistant coaches: Matt Scherbenske; Brock Widders
- Home arena: Farris Center (Capacity: 6,000)

2020–21 Southland Conference men's basketball standings
	Conf.				Overall
Team	W		L	PCT	W		L	PCT
Nicholls	14	–	2	.875	18	–	7	.720
Abilene Christian †	13	–	2	.867	24	–	5	.828
Sam Houston State	13	–	3	.813	19	–	9	.679
Stephen F. Austin*	12	–	3	.800	16	–	5	.762
Northwestern State	9	–	7	.563	11	–	18	.379
New Orleans	8	–	7	.533	10	–	15	.400
Lamar	6	–	10	.375	10	–	18	.357
Incarnate Word	5	–	9	.357	8	–	14	.364
Southeastern Louisiana	5	–	10	.333	8	–	18	.308
McNeese State	4	–	10	.286	10	–	14	.417
Houston Baptist	4	–	11	.267	6	–	19	.240
Central Arkansas	4	–	12	.250	5	–	19	.208
Texas A&M–CC	2	–	13	.133	5	–	19	.208
† 2021 Southland tournament winner *Ineligible for postseason due to postseason ban

The 2020–21 Central Arkansas Bears basketball team represented the University of Central Arkansas (UCA) in the 2020–21 NCAA Division I men's basketball season. The Bears, led by first-year head coach Anthony Boone, played their home games at the on-campus Farris Center in Conway, Arkansas. This was the Bears' last season as members of the Southland Conference; UCA left the Southland in July 2021 to join the ASUN Conference.

== Previous season ==
The Bears finished the 2019–20 season 10–21, 9–11 in Southland play to finish in ninth place. They failed to qualify for the Southland Conference tournament.

== Roster ==
2020–21 Central Arkansas Bears men's basketball team
Players
Coaches

Pos.	#	Name	Height	Weight	Year	Hometown
PF	0	SK Shittu	6 ft 9 in (2.06 m)	215 lb (98 kg)	Jr	Rogers, Arkansas
G	1	Rylan Bergersen	6 ft 6 in (1.98 m)	205 lb (93 kg)	Sr	Boise, Idaho
G	2	Lewis McDaniel	6 ft 3 in (1.91 m)	180 lb (82 kg)	So	Nashville, Tennessee
G	3	Suazell Farmer	6 ft 0 in (1.83 m)	164 lb (74 kg)	Fr	West Helena, Arkansas
G	4	Khaleem Bennett	6 ft 4 in (1.93 m)	200 lb (91 kg)	So	Hamilton, Ontario
G	5	Masai Olowokere	6 ft 5 in (1.96 m)	190 lb (86 kg)	So	Brooklyn, New York
G	10	Masai Olowokere	6 ft 5 in (1.96 m)	190 lb (86 kg)	Fr	Clinton, Arkansas
G	12	Trey South	6 ft 3 in (1.91 m)	170 lb (77 kg)	Fr	Spring, Texas
G/F	13	Eddy Kayouloud	6 ft 7 in (2.01 m)	220 lb (100 kg)	Jr	Paris, France
G	14	Collin Cooper	6 ft 2 in (1.88 m)	185 lb (84 kg)	So	Fayetteville, Arkansas
G	15	Brendan Simmons	6 ft 2 in (1.88 m)	192 lb (87 kg)	Fr	El Dorado, Arkansas
C	21	Jonas Munson	7 ft 0 in (2.13 m)	220 lb (100 kg)	RS Fr	Alexandria, Virginia
F	23	Samson George	6 ft 7 in (2.01 m)	220 lb (100 kg)	GS	Minna, Nigeria
F	24	Jared Chatham	6 ft 8 in (2.03 m)	185 lb (84 kg)	Sr	Los Angeles, California
C	32	Churchill Bounds	6 ft 10 in (2.08 m)	260 lb (118 kg)	Fr	Cumberland, Maryland
G/F	34	Jaxson Baker	6 ft 7 in (2.01 m)	200 lb (91 kg)	RS So	Phoenix, Arizona
PG	55	DeAndre Jones	5 ft 11 in (1.8 m)	160 lb (73 kg)	Sr	Boise, Idaho

Head coach

- Anthony Boone (Mississippi)

Assistant coach(es)

- Matt Scherbenske (Kentucky)
- Brock Widders (Lyon)

Legend

- (C) Team captain
- (S) Suspended
- (I) Ineligible
- (W) Walk-on
- Injured
- Current redshirt

Roster
Last update: December 6, 2020

== Schedule and results ==
Date time, TV	Rank^{#}	Opponent^{#}	Result	Record	Site (attendance) city, state
Non-conference Regular season
November 25, 2020*; 1:00 pm		at Ole Miss; Justin Reed Ole Miss Classic	Canceled due to COVID-19 issues		The Pavilion at Ole Miss; Oxford, MS
November 26, 2020*; 4:00 pm		vs. Arkansas State; Justin Reed Ole Miss Classic	Canceled due to COVID-19 issues		The Pavilion at Ole Miss; Oxford, MS
November 27, 2020*; 4:00 pm		vs. Jackson State; Justin Reed Ole Miss Classic	Canceled due to COVID-19 issues		The Pavilion at Ole Miss; Oxford, MS
December 1, 2020*; 7:00 pm		at Missouri State	Canceled due to COVID-19 issues		JQH Arena; Springfield, MO
December 4, 2020*; 7:00 pm, ESPN+		at Memphis	L 68–85	0–1	FedExForum (2,564); Memphis, TN
December 6, 2020*; 2:00 pm		at Little Rock; Governor's I-40 Showdown	L 83–86	0–2	Jack Stephens Center; Little Rock, AR
December 8, 2020*; 7:00 pm, FSMW		at Saint Louis	L 65–88	0–3	Chaifetz Arena; St. Louis, MO
December 12, 2020*; 5:00 pm, SECN		at Arkansas	L 75–100	0–4	Bud Walton Arena (4,189); Fayetteville, AR
December 14, 2020*; 7:00 pm, SECN		at Ole Miss	L 54–68	0–5	The Pavilion at Ole Miss (895); Oxford, MS
December 16, 2020*; 7:00 pm, SECN		at Mississippi State	L 65–81	0–6	Humphrey Coliseum (1,000); Starkville, MS
December 19, 2020*; 2:00 pm		Champion Christian	W 92–28	1–6	Farris Center (157); Conway, AR
December 29, 2020*; 3:00 pm, ESPN+		at No. 2 Baylor	L 56–93	1–7	Ferrell Center; Waco, TX
Southland Regular season
January 2, 2021; 4:00 pm		at McNeese State	W 81–67	2–7 (1–0)	HH&P Complex (477); Lake Charles, LA
January 6, 2021; 7:00 pm		New Orleans	W 83–79	3–7 (2–0)	Farris Center (348); Conway, AR
January 9, 2021; 4:00 pm		Sam Houston State	L 80–91	3–8 (2–1)	Farris Center (485); Conway, AR
January 13, 2021; 6:30 pm, ESPN+		at Stephen F. Austin	L 69–95	3–9 (2–2)	William R. Johnson Coliseum (1,089); Nacogdoches, TX
January 16, 2021; 4:00 pm		Nicholls	L 72–74	3–10 (2–3)	Farris Center (258); Conway, AR
January 23, 2021; 1:00 pm		at Abilene Christian	L 58–93	3–11 (2–4)	Moody Coliseum (411); Abilene, TX
January 27, 2021; 7:00 pm		at Southeastern Louisiana	L 57–69	3–12 (2–5)	University Center (527); Hammond, LA
January 30, 2021; 7:00 pm		Northwestern State	L 77–81	3–13 (2–6)	Farris Center (147); Conway, AR
February 6, 2021; 4:00 pm		McNeese State	L 70–80	3–14 (2–7)	Farris Center (486); Conway, AR
February 10, 2021; 7:00 pm		at New Orleans	Postponed due to COVID-19 issues		Lakefront Arena; New Orleans, LA
February 13, 2021; 5:00 pm		at Sam Houston State	L 57–97	3–15 (2–8)	Bernard Johnson Coliseum (677); Huntsville, TX
February 17, 2021; 7:00 pm		Stephen F. Austin	Postponed due to weather		Farris Center; Conway, AR
February 20, 2021; 5:00 pm		at Nicholls	L 68–79	3–16 (2–9)	Stopher Gymnasium (132); Thibodaux, LA
February 22, 2021; 7:00 pm		at New Orleans rescheduled from February 10	L 63–88	3–17 (2–10)	Lakefront Arena (484); New Orleans, LA
February 27, 2021; 7:00 pm		Abilene Christian	W 84–82	4–17 (3–10)	Farris Center (489); Conway, AR
March 1, 2021; 3:00 pm		Stephen F. Austin rescheduled from February 17	L 66–79	4–18 (3–11)	Farris Center (297); Conway, AR
March 3, 2021; 7:00 pm		Southeastern Louisiana	W 88–71	5–18 (4–11)	Farris Center (372); Conway, AR
March 6, 2021; 3:00 pm		at Northwestern State	L 70–79	5–19 (4–12)	Prather Coliseum; Natchitoches, LA
*Non-conference game. ^{#}Rankings from AP Poll. (#) Tournament seedings in parentheses. All times are in Central.
