= 2020–21 New Orleans Privateers men's basketball team =

American college basketball season

2020–21 New Orleans Privateers men's basketball
- Conference: Southland Conference
- Record: 10–15 (8–7 Southland)
- Head coach: Mark Slessinger (10th season)
- Assistant coaches: Jody Bailey; Kris Arkenberg; Jay Smith
- Home arena: Lakefront Arena

2020–21 Southland Conference men's basketball standings
	Conf.				Overall
Team	W		L	PCT	W		L	PCT
Nicholls	14	–	2	.875	18	–	7	.720
Abilene Christian †	13	–	2	.867	24	–	5	.828
Sam Houston State	13	–	3	.813	19	–	9	.679
Stephen F. Austin*	12	–	3	.800	16	–	5	.762
Northwestern State	9	–	7	.563	11	–	18	.379
New Orleans	8	–	7	.533	10	–	15	.400
Lamar	6	–	10	.375	10	–	18	.357
Incarnate Word	5	–	9	.357	8	–	14	.364
Southeastern Louisiana	5	–	10	.333	8	–	18	.308
McNeese State	4	–	10	.286	10	–	14	.417
Houston Baptist	4	–	11	.267	6	–	19	.240
Central Arkansas	4	–	12	.250	5	–	19	.208
Texas A&M–CC	2	–	13	.133	5	–	19	.208
† 2021 Southland tournament winner *Ineligible for postseason due to postseason ban

The 2020–21 New Orleans Privateers men's basketball team represented the University of New Orleans during the 2020–21 NCAA Division I men's basketball season. The Privateers were led by tenth-year head coach Mark Slessinger and played their home games at Lakefront Arena as members of the Southland Conference.

== Previous season ==
The Privateers finished the season 9–21, 5–15 in Southland play to finish in a tie for 11th place. They failed to qualify for the Southland Conference tournament.

== Roster ==
2020–21 New Orleans Privateers men's basketball team
Players
Coaches

Pos.	#	Name	Height	Weight	Year	Hometown
G	0	Jay Rodgers	6 ft 3 in (1.91 m)	185 lb (84 kg)	Fr	Columbus, Ohio
G	1	Damion Rosser	6 ft 4 in (1.93 m)	220 lb (100 kg)	RS Jr	McDonough, Georgia
G	2	Lamont Berzat	5 ft 6 in (1.68 m)	155 lb (70 kg)	Sr	New Orleans, Louisiana
G	3	Troy Green	6 ft 3 in (1.91 m)	215 lb (98 kg)	Sr	St. Rose, Louisiana
F	4	Jahmel Myers	6 ft 6 in (1.98 m)	215 lb (98 kg)	Jr	Cape Coral, Florida
G	5	Charles Bohannon	6 ft 4 in (1.93 m)	205 lb (93 kg)	Sr	Austin, Texas
G	10	Derek St. Hilaire	6 ft 0 in (1.83 m)	180 lb (82 kg)	GS	Atlanta, Georgia
F	11	Haren Freeman	6 ft 6 in (1.98 m)	235 lb (107 kg)	So	Orange Park, Florida
G	12	Norris Williams	6 ft 2 in (1.88 m)	165 lb (75 kg)	Fr	New Orleans, Louisiana
G	13	Kmani Doughty	6 ft 5 in (1.96 m)	195 lb (88 kg)	RS Fr	Brooklyn, New York
G	15	Tamir Bynum	6 ft 2 in (1.88 m)	160 lb (73 kg)	Jr	Houston, Texas
G	20	Larry Robinson III	5 ft 11 in (1.8 m)	175 lb (79 kg)	RS Sr	Bossier City, Louisiana
F	21	Bol Tong	6 ft 9 in (2.06 m)	215 lb (98 kg)	Jr	Kansas City, Missouri
F	23	Ladarius Marshall	6 ft 6 in (1.98 m)	230 lb (104 kg)	Jr	Jackson, Mississippi
G	24	Rodney Carson Jr.	6 ft 3 in (1.91 m)	180 lb (82 kg)	So	Philadelphia, Pennsylvania
G	32	Rashad Holmes	5 ft 11 in (1.8 m)	160 lb (73 kg)	Fr	New Orleans, Louisiana
F	33	D'Ante Bell	6 ft 9 in (2.06 m)	225 lb (102 kg)	Fr	Shreveport, Louisiana

Head coach

- Mark Slessinger (Aurora)

Assistant coach(es)

- Jody Bailey (Louisville)
- Kris Arkenberg (IUPUI)
- Jay Smith (LSU–Alexandria)

Legend

- (C) Team captain
- (S) Suspended
- (I) Ineligible
- (W) Walk-on
- Injured
- Current redshirt

Roster
Last update: 2020-12-07

== Schedule and results ==
Date time, TV	Rank^{#}	Opponent^{#}	Result	Record	Site (attendance) city, state
Non-conference Regular season
Nov 26, 2020*; 8:00 pm, BYUtv		at BYU	L 61–86	0–1	Marriott Center; Provo, UT
Nov 29, 2020*; 2:00 pm, SECN+		at Texas A&M	L 53–82	0–2	Reed Arena (1,114); College Station, TX
Dec 2, 2020*; 7:00 pm		Louisiana	L 63–66	0–3	Lakefront Arena (500); New Orleans, LA
Dec 8, 2020*; 1:30 pm		vs. Florida National; Dolphin Classic	W 74–57	1–3	Swisher Gymnasium (42); Jacksonville, FL
Dec 9, 2020*; 1:30 pm		vs. Campbell; Dolphin Classic	L 70–79	1–4	Swisher Gymnasium (38); Jacksonville, FL
Dec 10, 2020*; 4:00 pm, ESPN+		at Jacksonville; Dolphin Classic	L 70–77	1–5	Swisher Gymnasium (180); Jacksonville, FL
Dec 15, 2020*; 6:00 pm, ESPN+		at Louisiana	L 63–73	1–6	Cajundome (366); Lafayette, LA
Dec 16, 2020*; 8:00 pm, SECN		at LSU	Canceled due to COVID-19 issues		Pete Maravich Assembly Center; Baton Rouge, LA
Dec 21, 2020*; 2:00 pm		at Rice	L 62–73	1–7	Tudor Fieldhouse; Houston, TX
Southland Regular season
Jan 2, 2021; 4:30 pm, ESPN+		at Stephen F. Austin	L 67–78	1–8 (0–1)	William R. Johnson Coliseum (1,035); Nacogdoches, TX
Jan 6, 2021; 4:30 pm		at Central Arkansas	L 79–83	1–9 (0–2)	Farris Center (348); Conway, AR
Jan 9, 2021; 6:00 pm, ESPN+		Incarnate Word	W 86–64	2–9 (1–2)	Lakefront Arena (425); New Orleans, LA
Jan 16, 2021; 6:00 pm		McNeese State	W 99–84	3–9 (2–2)	Lakefront Arena (486); New Orleans, LA
Jan 20, 2021; 7:00 pm		Texas A&M–Corpus Christi	W 87–68	4–9 (3–2)	Lakefront Arena (500); New Orleans, LA
Jan 23, 2021; 5:00 pm		at Nicholls	L 62–86	4–10 (3–3)	Stopher Gymnasium (230); Thibodaux, LA
Jan 27, 2021; 6:30 pm		at Northwestern State	L 73–81	4–11 (3–4)	Prather Coliseum (975); Natchitoches, LA
Jan 30, 2021; 4:00 pm, ESPN+		at Southeastern Louisiana	L 73–79	4–12 (3–5)	University Center (317); Hammond, LA
Feb 6, 2021; 6:00 pm, ESPN+		Stephen F. Austin	Postponed due to COVID-19 issues		Lakefront Arena; New Orleans, LA
Feb 10, 2021; 7:00 pm		Central Arkansas	Postponed due to COVID-19 issues		Lakefront Arena; New Orleans, LA
Feb 13, 2021; 6:30 pm		at Incarnate Word	Postponed due to COVID-19 issues		McDermott Center; San Antonio, TX
Feb 15, 2021; 6:00 pm, ESPN+		Stephen F. Austin rescheduled from February 6	L 79–89	4–13 (3–6)	Lakefront Arena (500); New Orleans, LA
Feb 20, 2021; 4:00 pm		at McNeese State	Canceled due to COVID-19 issues		Burton Coliseum; Lake Charles, LA
Feb 22, 2021; 7:00 pm		Central Arkansas rescheduled from February 10	W 88–63	5–13 (4–6)	Lakefront Arena (484); New Orleans, LA
Feb 24, 2021; 7:00 pm		at Texas A&M–Corpus Christi	W 69–61	6–13 (5–6)	American Bank Center (708); Corpus Christi, TX
Feb 27, 2020; 6:00 pm		Nicholls	L 101–105 ^{OT}	6–14 (5–7)	Lakefront Arena (726); New Orleans, LA
Mar 1, 2021; 7:00 pm		at Incarnate Word rescheduled from February 13	W 88–72	7–14 (6–7)	McDermott Center (176); San Antonio, TX
Mar 3, 2021; 7:00 pm		Northwestern State	W 92–83	8–14 (7–7)	Lakefront Arena (551); New Orleans, LA
Mar 6, 2021; 7:00 pm		Southeastern Louisiana	W 81–76 ^{OT}	9–14 (8–7)	Lakefront Arena (940); New Orleans, LA
Southland tournament
March 10, 2021; 5:00 pm, ESPN+	(5)	vs. (8) Southeastern Louisiana; Second round	W 80–63	10–14	Merrell Center; Katy, TX
March 11, 2021; 5:00 pm, ESPN+	(5)	vs. (4) Northwestern State; Quarterfinals	L 79–82	10–15	Merrell Center; Katy, TX
*Non-conference game. ^{#}Rankings from AP Poll. (#) Tournament seedings in parentheses. All times are in Central Time.
