= 2021 Southland Conference men's basketball tournament =

2021 men's basketball championship tournament

- Classification: Division I
- Season: 2020–21
- Teams: 10
- Site: Merrell Center; Katy, Texas
- Champions: Abilene Christian (2nd title)
- Winning coach: Joe Golding (2nd title)
- MVP: Damien Daniels (Abilene Christian)
- Attendance: 3,858 (total); 1,205 (championship)
- Television: ESPN+, ESPN2

2020–21 Southland Conference men's basketball standings
	Conf.				Overall
Team	W		L	PCT	W		L	PCT
Nicholls	14	–	2	.875	18	–	7	.720
Abilene Christian †	13	–	2	.867	24	–	5	.828
Sam Houston State	13	–	3	.813	19	–	9	.679
Stephen F. Austin*	12	–	3	.800	16	–	5	.762
Northwestern State	9	–	7	.563	11	–	18	.379
New Orleans	8	–	7	.533	10	–	15	.400
Lamar	6	–	10	.375	10	–	18	.357
Incarnate Word	5	–	9	.357	8	–	14	.364
Southeastern Louisiana	5	–	10	.333	8	–	18	.308
McNeese State	4	–	10	.286	10	–	14	.417
Houston Baptist	4	–	11	.267	6	–	19	.240
Central Arkansas	4	–	12	.250	5	–	19	.208
Texas A&M–CC	2	–	13	.133	5	–	19	.208
† 2021 Southland tournament winner *Ineligible for postseason due to postseason ban

The 2021 Southland Conference men's basketball tournament was the postseason men's basketball tournament for the 2020–21 season in the Southland Conference. The tournament took place from March 9–13, 2021. The tournament winner received an automatic invitation to the 2021 NCAA Division I men's basketball tournament.

== Seeds ==
Teams were seeded by record within the conference, with a tie–breaker system to seed teams with identical conference records. Only the top 10 teams in the conference qualified for the tournament. The top two seeds received triple byes into the semifinals in the merit-based format. The No. 3 and No. 4 seeds received double byes to the quarterfinals. Stephen F. Austin is serving a postseason ban and did not compete.

Seed	School	Conference	Tiebreaker 1
1	Nicholls	14–2	
2	Abilene Christian	13–2	
3	Sam Houston State	13–3	
4	Northwestern State	9–7	
5	New Orleans	8–7	
6	Lamar	6–10	
7	Incarnate Word	5–9	
8	Southeastern Louisiana	5–10	
9	McNeese State	4–10	
10	Houston Baptist	4–11	

== Schedule ==
Session	Game	Time*	Matchup^{#}	Score	Television	Attendance
First round – Tuesday, March 9, 2021
1	1	5:00 p.m.	No. 8 Southeastern Louisiana vs. No. 9 McNeese State	71–68	ESPN+	416
1	2	8:00 p.m.	No. 7 Incarnate Word vs. No. 10 Houston Baptist	68–80	ESPN+	416
Second round – Wednesday, March 10, 2021
2	3	5:00 p.m.	No. 8 Southeastern Louisiana vs. No. 5 New Orleans	63–80	ESPN+	554
2	4	8:00 p.m.	No. 10 Houston Baptist vs. No. 6 Lamar	52–62	ESPN+	554
Quarterfinals – Thursday, March 11, 2021
3	5	5:00 p.m.	No. 5 New Orleans vs. No. 4 Northwestern State	79–82	ESPN+	633
3	6	8:00 p.m.	No. 6 Lamar vs. No. 3 Sam Houston State	70–69	ESPN+	633
Semifinals – Friday, March 12, 2021
3	7	5:00 p.m.	No. 4 Northwestern State vs. No. 1 Nicholls	76–88	ESPN+	1,050
3	8	8:00 p.m.	No. 6 Lamar vs. No. 2 Abilene Christian	71–93	ESPN+	1,050
Championship – Saturday, March 13, 2021
4	7	8:30 p.m.	No. 1 Nicholls vs. No. 2 Abilene Christian	45–79	ESPN2	1,205
*Game times in CST. #-Rankings denote tournament seeding.

== Bracket ==
First round Tuesday, March 9 ESPN+
8	Southeastern Louisiana	71
9	McNeese State	68
7	Incarnate Word	68
10	Houston Baptist	80

Second round Wednesday, March 10; ESPN+
5	New Orleans	80
8	Southeastern Louisiana	63
6	Lamar	62
10	Houston Baptist	52

Quarterfinals; Thursday, March 11; ESPN+
4	Northwestern State	82
5	New Orleans	79
3	Sam Houston State	69
6	Lamar	70

Semifinals; Friday, March 12; ESPN+
1	Nicholls	88
4	Northwestern State	76
2	Abilene Christian	93
6	Lamar	71

Championship; Saturday, March 13; ESPN2
1	Nicholls	45
2	Abilene Christian	79

== See also ==
- 2021 Southland Conference women's basketball tournament
- Southland Conference men's basketball tournament
