= Sharp Gymnasium =

Multi-purpose arena in Houston, Texas

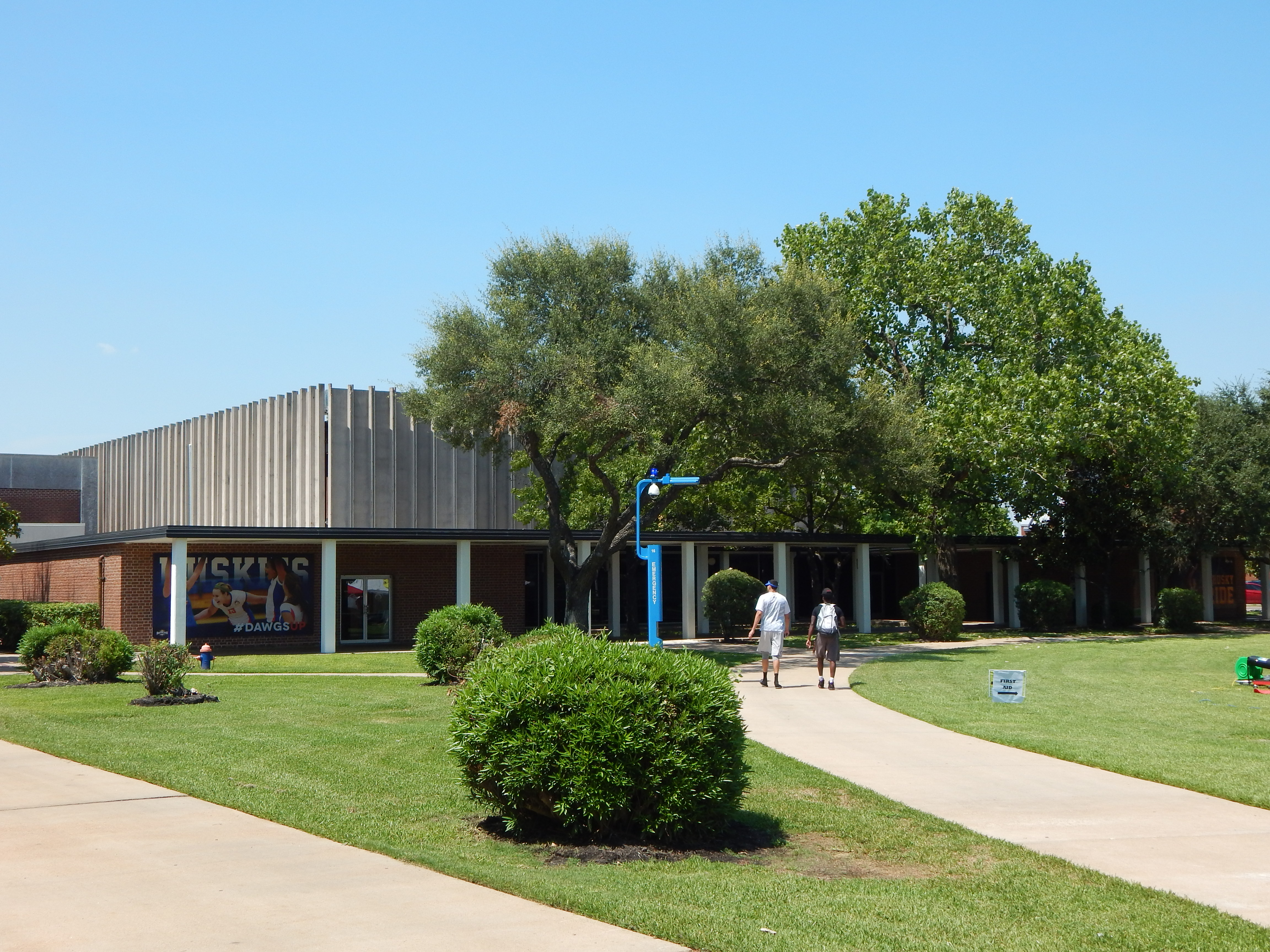
- Interactive map of Sharp Gymnasium
- Full name: Frank and Lucille Sharp Physical Education Building
- Location: 7502 Fondren Road; Houston, Texas 77074
- Coordinates: 29°41′42″N 95°31′01″W
- Owner: Houston Christian University
- Operator: Houston Christian University
- Capacity: 1,000
- Surface: Multi-surface

Construction
- Built: 1963
- Opened: 1964
- Renovated: 1994, 2011

Tenants
- Houston Christian Huskies men's basketball Houston Christian Huskies women's basketball Houston Christian Huskies women's volleyball

Website
- hcuhuskies.com/sports/2011/9/21/Facilities

The Frank and Lucille Sharp Gymnasium is a 1,000-seat multi-purpose arena in Houston, Texas. It was built in 1963 and is home to the Houston Christian University (Note: Known as Houston Baptist College from 1960 to 1973 and Houston Baptist University from 1973 to 2022.) Huskies basketball and volleyball teams.

Sharp Gymnasium served as the temporary home court for the 2007–08 Rice Owls women's team for nine home games while Rice University renovated Autry Court to Tudor Fieldhouse.

== Year by year ==
The Huskies joined the Southland Conference prior to the 2013–2014 season. In the past 10 seasons they have had a winning record at home 6 times, and have hit double digits wins at home 3 times.

Houston Christian Huskies
Season	Average Crowd	Largest Crowd	Home Record
2011–12	628	1,041	9–5
2012–13	607	824	8–4
2013–14	701	922	5–8
2014–15	788	1,046	10–3
2015–16	750	1,082	12–3
2016–17	731	963	13–1
2017–18	680	963	5–8
2018–19	727	1,000	9–4
2019–20	689	921	2–9
2020–21	133*	150*	4–6
2021–22	631	1,000	7–6
2022–23	653	1,000	8–8
2023–24	577	924	5–8
2024–25	668	988	8–7
2025–26	707	985	9–5
Total			114–85 (.573)

== Gallery ==
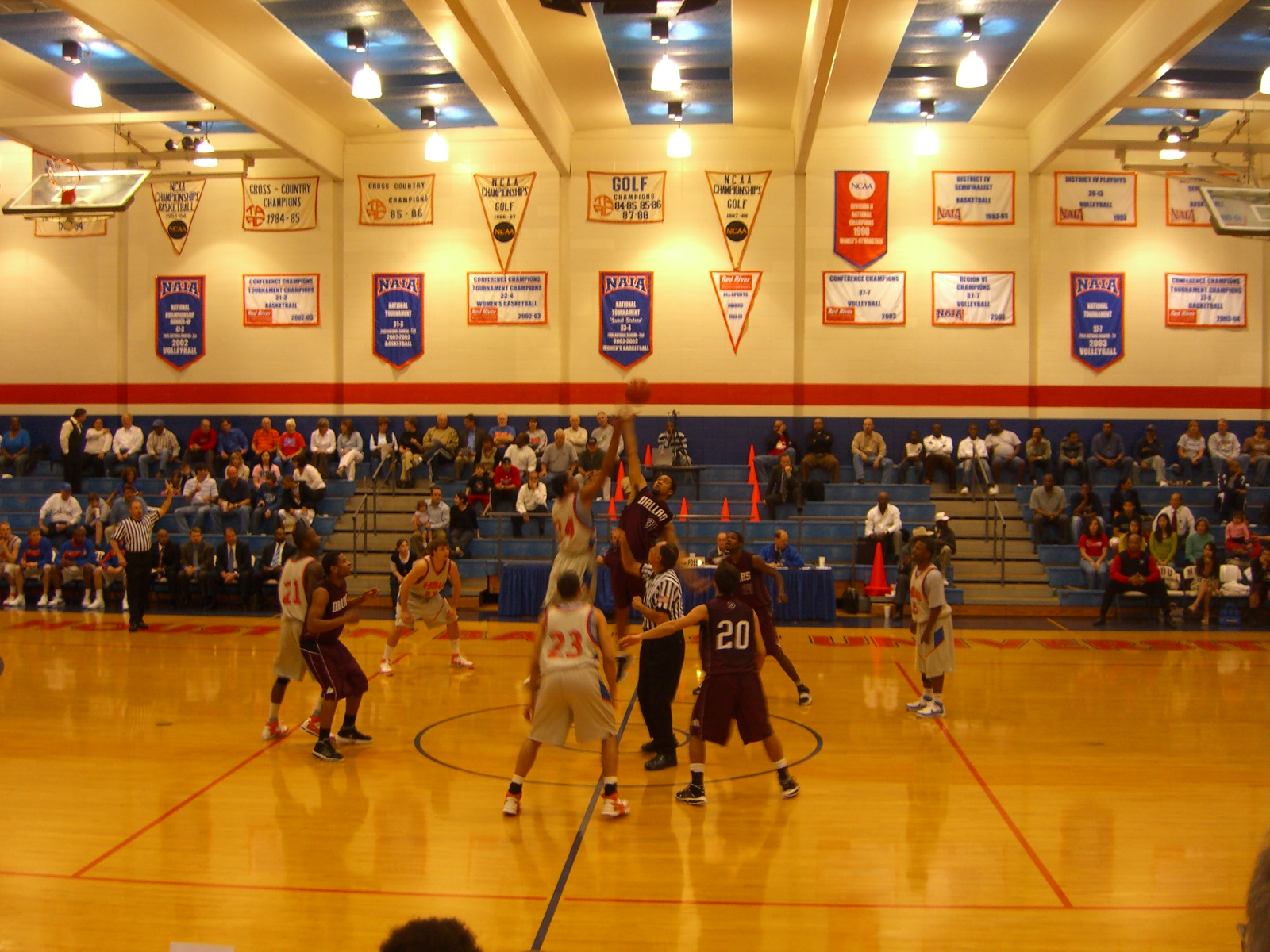
A tip-off begins a men's basketball game at Sharp Gymnasium on February 18, 2008, between against the Dallas Christian Crusaders

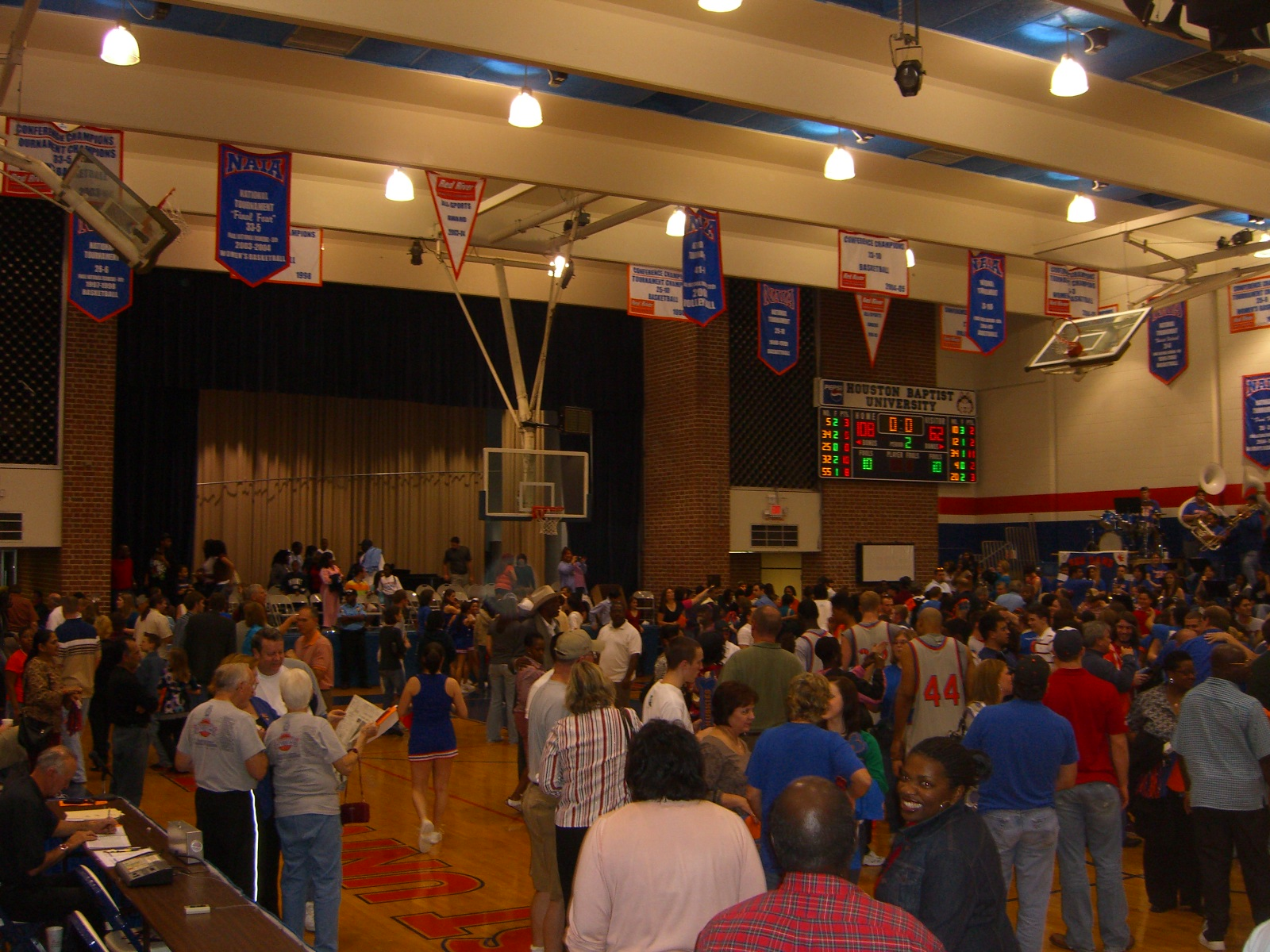
A crowd gathers on the basketball court at Sharp Gymnasium after a men's basketball game between the Houston Baptist Huskies and Bacone Warriors on February 9, 2008.

== See also ==
- List of NCAA Division I basketball arenas
