= 2019–20 Lamar Cardinals basketball team =

American college basketball season

2019–20 Lamar Cardinals basketball
- Conference: Southland Conference
- Record: 17–15 (10–10 Southland)
- Head coach: Tic Price (6th season)
- Assistant coaches: David Dumars (2nd season); Brandon Chappell (3rd season); Joey Cantafio (1st season)
- Home arena: Montagne Center (Capacity: 10,080)

2019–20 Southland Conference men's basketball standings
	Conf.				Overall
Team	W		L	PCT	W		L	PCT
Stephen F. Austin	19	–	1	.950	28	–	3	.903
Abilene Christian	15	–	5	.750	20	–	11	.645
Nicholls	15	–	5	.750	21	–	10	.677
Sam Houston State	11	–	9	.550	18	–	13	.581
Northwestern State	11	–	9	.550	15	–	15	.500
Lamar	10	–	10	.500	17	–	15	.531
McNeese State	10	–	10	.500	15	–	17	.469
Texas A&M–CC	10	–	10	.500	14	–	18	.438
Central Arkansas	9	–	11	.450	10	–	21	.323
Incarnate Word	6	–	14	.300	9	–	22	.290
New Orleans	5	–	15	.250	9	–	21	.300
Southeastern Louisiana	5	–	15	.250	8	–	23	.258
Houston Baptist	4	–	16	.200	4	–	25	.138
Note: The 2020 SLC tournament was canceled after the first round due to the COVID-19 pandemic.

The 2019–20 Lamar Cardinals basketball team represented Lamar University during the 2019–20 NCAA Division I men's basketball season. The Cardinals were led by sixth-year head coach Tic Price and played their home games at the Montagne Center in Beaumont, Texas as members of the Southland Conference. They finished the season 17–15, 10–10 in Southland play to finish in a three-way tie for sixth place. They defeated McNeese State in the first round of the Southland tournament and were set to face Nicholls in the second round before the tournament was cancelled amid the COVID-19 pandemic.

== Previous season ==
The Cardinals finished conference play with as 12–6 record in a three-way tie with New Orleans and Southeastern Louisiana for third place. The team qualified for the 2019 Southland Conference men's basketball tournament as the fifth seeded team. They won the first-round game against eighth seed Houston Baptist by a score of 81–79. The season ended when the Cardinals were eliminated in the second round by fourth seed New Orleans with a score of 72–76.

== Roster ==
2019–20 Lamar Cardinals men's basketball team
Players
Coaches

Pos.	#	Name	Height	Weight	Year	Hometown
C	0	David Muoka	6 ft 10 in (2.08 m)	210 lb (95 kg)	Fr	Hong Kong
F	1	Kain Harris	6 ft 4 in (1.93 m)	200 lb (91 kg)	Sr	Chicago, Illinois
F	2	Corey Nickerson	6 ft 7 in (2.01 m)	190 lb (86 kg)	Fr	Houston, Texas
G	3	Ellis Jefferson	6 ft 0 in (1.83 m)	180 lb (82 kg)	Jr	San Antonio, Texas
F/C	5	Avery Sullivan	6 ft 8 in (2.03 m)	220 lb (100 kg)	Jr	Pflugerville, Texas
F	10	Dylan Morrison	6 ft 7 in (2.01 m)	180 lb (82 kg)	Jr	Brampton Ontario Canada
F	11	Anderson Kopp	6 ft 5 in (1.96 m)	190 lb (86 kg)	Fr	Houston, Texas
G	12	V.J. Holmes	6 ft 4 in (1.93 m)	185 lb (84 kg)	Sr	Jupiter, Florida
G	13	Davion Buster	5 ft 10 in (1.78 m)	150 lb (68 kg)	So	Austin, Texas
G/F	15	T. J. Atwood	6 ft 6 in (1.98 m)	203 lb (92 kg)	Sr	Beaumont, Texas
G	21	Ayaan Sohail	6 ft 3 in (1.91 m)	185 lb (84 kg)	Fr	El Paso, Texas
F	23	Jordan Wallace	6 ft 8 in (2.03 m)	185 lb (84 kg)	So	Missouri City, Texas
F	25	Anthony Cameron	6 ft 8 in (2.03 m)	270 lb (122 kg)	Jr	Chicago, Illinois

Head coach

- Tic Price (Virginia Tech)

Assistant coach(es)

- David Dumars (Louisiana–Monroe)
- Brandon Chappell (Lamar)
- Joey Cantafio (VMI)

Legend

- (C) Team captain
- (S) Suspended
- (I) Ineligible
- (W) Walk-on
- Injured
- Current redshirt

Roster
Last update: November 27, 2019

== TV and radio media ==
All Lamar games will be broadcast on KLVI, also known as News Talk 560.

Live video of all home games (except those picked up by Southland Conference TV agreements) will be streamed on ESPN3.

== Schedule and results ==
Date time, TV	Rank^{#}	Opponent^{#}	Result	Record	High points	High rebounds	High assists	Site (attendance) city, state
Non-conference regular season
November 5, 2019*; 11:00 am, ESPN3		Champion Christian	W 86–40	1–0	21 – Buster	7 – Tied, 3	9 – Buster	Montagne Center (3,856); Beaumont, TX
Nov 8, 2019*; 7:00 pm		Arlington Baptist	W 106–61	2–0	25 – Atwood	11 – Nickerson	6 – Holmes	Montagne Center (1,660); Beaumont, TX
Nov 12, 2019*; 6:00 pm, ESPN+		at Duquesne	L 56–66	2–1	15 – Atwood	8 – Atwood	4 – Tied, 2	Kerr Fitness Center (859); McCandless, PA
Nov 15, 2019*; 7:00 pm, ESPN3		Mount St. Mary's; BBN Showcase	W 76–61	3–1	20 – Buster	7 – Sullivan	5 – Holmes	Montagne Center (1,590); Beaumont, TX
Nov 21, 2019*; 8:00 pm, WAC DN		at Utah Valley; BBN Showcase	W 74–68	4–1	17 – Sullivan	14 – Sullivan	2 – Tied, 2	UCCU Center (1,928); Orem, UT
Nov 24, 2019*; 5:00 pm, SECN		at No. 9 Kentucky; BBN Showcase	L 56–81	4–2	19 – Buster	13 – Sullivan	4 – Holmes	Rupp Arena (20,048); Lexington, KY
Nov 26, 2019*; 7:00 pm, CUSA.TV		at UAB; BBN Showcase	L 48–57	4–3	16 – Atwood	12 – Atwood	4 – Holmes	Bartow Arena (2,187); Birmingham, AL
Nov 30, 2019*; 7:30 pm		at Texas Southern	L 73–76	4–4	23 – Buster	12 – Sullivan	6 – Holmes	Health and Physical Education Arena (1,949); Houston, TX
December 7, 2019*; 2:00 pm, ESPN+		Rice	W 73–60	5–4	22 – Atwood	9 – Nickerson	5 – Holmes	Montagne Center (1,807); Beaumont, TX
Dec 11, 2019*; 7:00 pm, ESPN3		Southern University (New Orleans)	W 73–56	6–4	24 – Sullivan	16 – Sullivan	7 – Holmes	Montagne Center (1,513); Beaumont, TX
Dec 14, 2019*; 2:00 pm, FSSW		at TCU	W 79–50	6–5	14 – Tied, 2	14 – Sullivan	5 – Buster	Schollmaier Arena (6,313); Fort Worth, TX
Southland Conference regular season
December 18, 2019; 7:00 pm, ESPN+		Southeastern Louisiana	W 79–73 ^{OT}	7–5 (1–0)	34 – Atwood	13 – Muoka	6 – Jefferson	Montagne Center (1,412); Beaumont, TX
Dec 21, 2019; 3:00 pm		at Northwestern State	L 61–67	7–6 (1–1)	12 – Tied, 2	9 – Sullivan	3 – Buster	Prather Coliseum (951); Natchitoches, LA
January 2, 2020; 7:00 pm		at New Orleans	W 74–67	8–6 (2–1)	23 – Buster	12 – Sullivan	2 – Buster	Lakefront Arena (518); New Orleans, LA
Jan 4, 2020; 2:00 pm, ESPN3		Abilene Christian	L 62–74	8–7 (2–2)	21 – Atwood	7 – Sullivan	3 – Sullivan	Montagne Center (1,936); Beaumont, TX
Jan 8, 2020; 7:00 pm, ESPN3		Nicholls	L 52–61	8–8 (2–3)	13 – Jefferson	11 – Atwood	7 – Jefferson	Montagne Center (1,811); Beaumont, TX
Jan 11, 2020; 7:00 pm		at Houston Baptist	W 102–92	9–8 (3–3)	21 – Atwood	10 – Sullivan	7 – Holmes	Sharp Gymnasium (684); Houston, TX
Jan 15, 2020; 7:00 pm, ESPN+		Sam Houston State	L 75–80 ^{OT}	9–9 (3–4)	19 – Holmes	12 – Atwood	7 – Holmes	Montagne Center (1,952); Beaumont, TX
Jan 18, 2020; 3:30 pm		at Texas A&M–Corpus Christi	L 58–64	9–10 (3–5)	15 – Kopp	6 – Sullivan	3 – Holmes	American Bank Center (1,711); Corpus Christi, TX
Jan 22, 2020; 7:00 pm		at Incarnate Word	W 89–77	10–10 (4–5)	23 – Atwood	11 – Atwood	5 – Holmes	McDermott Center (310); San Antonio, TX
Jan 25, 2020; 4:30 pm, ESPN+		Stephen F. Austin	L 62–70	10–11 (4–6)	17 – Buster	6 – Muoka	4 – Holmes	Montagne Center (4,254); Beaumont, TX
February 1, 2020; 3:00 pm		at McNeese State	W 96–91	11–11 (5–6)	39 – Buster	7 – Atwood	10 – Holmes	H&HP Complex (4,134); Lake Charles, LA
Feb 5, 2020; 7:00 pm, ESPN+		Central Arkansas	W 74–67	12–11 (6–6)	14 – Kopp	10 – Atwood	9 – Holmes	Montagne Center (1,944); Beaumont, TX
Feb 8, 2020; 7:00 pm, ESPN+		at Abilene Christian	L 49–84	12–12 (6–7)	19 – Holmes	8 – Muoka	2 – Tied	Moody Coliseum (1,489); Abilene, TX
Feb 12, 2020; 7:00 pm		at Nicholls	L 65–69	12–13 (6–8)	24 – Sullivan	9 – Atwood	3 – Tied	Stopher Gymnasium (807); Thibodaux, LA
Feb 15, 2020; 2:00 pm, ESPN3		Houston Baptist	W 79–69	13–13 (7–8)	22 – Sullivan	9 – Atwood	6 – Holmes	Montagne Center (1,664); Beaumont, TX
Feb 19, 2020; 6:30 pm, ESPN+		at Sam Houston State	W 77–65	14–13 (8–8)	20 – Atwood	6 – Sullivan	6 – Holmes	Bernard Johnson Coliseum (896); Huntsville, TX
Feb 22, 2020; 4:30 pm, ESPN+		Texas A&M–Corpus Christi	W 79–62	15–13 (9–8)	22 – Atwood	10 – Sullivan	6 – Holmes	Montagne Center (2,841); Beaumont, TX
Feb 26, 2020; 7:00 pm, ESPN+		Incarnate Word	W 86–66	16–13 (10–8)	26 – Atwood	9 – Sullivan	8 – Holmes	Montagne Center (1,755); Beaumont, TX
Feb 29, 2020; 4:30 pm, ESPN3		at Stephen F. Austin	L 76–95	16–14 (10–9)	17 – Atwood	12 – Atwood	3 – Kopp	William R. Johnson Coliseum (4,184); Nacogdoches, TX
March 7, 2020; 4:30 pm, ESPN+		McNeese State	L 66–70	16–15 (10–10)	23 – Atwood	10 – Atwood	8 – Holmes	Montagne Center (3,847); Beaumont, TX
Southland Tournament
Mar 11, 2020; 7:30 pm, ESPN+	(6)	vs. (7) McNeese State; First round	W 80–59	17–15	20 – Atwood	10 – Sullivan	6 – Holmes	Leonard E. Merrell Center; Katy, TX
Mar 12, 2020; 7:30 pm, ESPN+	(6)	vs. (3) Nicholls; Second round	Cancelled due to the COVID-19 pandemic					Leonard E. Merrell Center; Katy, TX
*Non-conference game. ^{#}Rankings from AP Poll. (#) Tournament seedings in parentheses. All times are in Central Time.

== See also ==
- 2019–20 Lamar Lady Cardinals basketball team
