= 2019–20 New Orleans Privateers men's basketball team =

American college basketball season

2019–20 New Orleans Privateers men's basketball
- Conference: Southland Conference
- Record: 9–21 (5–15 Southland)
- Head coach: Mark Slessinger (9th season)
- Assistant coaches: Jody Bailey; Kris Arkenberg; Jay Smith
- Home arena: Lakefront Arena

2019–20 Southland Conference men's basketball standings
	Conf.				Overall
Team	W		L	PCT	W		L	PCT
Stephen F. Austin	19	–	1	.950	28	–	3	.903
Abilene Christian	15	–	5	.750	20	–	11	.645
Nicholls	15	–	5	.750	21	–	10	.677
Sam Houston State	11	–	9	.550	18	–	13	.581
Northwestern State	11	–	9	.550	15	–	15	.500
Lamar	10	–	10	.500	17	–	15	.531
McNeese State	10	–	10	.500	15	–	17	.469
Texas A&M–CC	10	–	10	.500	14	–	18	.438
Central Arkansas	9	–	11	.450	10	–	21	.323
Incarnate Word	6	–	14	.300	9	–	22	.290
New Orleans	5	–	15	.250	9	–	21	.300
Southeastern Louisiana	5	–	15	.250	8	–	23	.258
Houston Baptist	4	–	16	.200	4	–	25	.138
Note: The 2020 SLC tournament was canceled after the first round due to the COVID-19 pandemic.

The 2019–20 New Orleans Privateers men's basketball team represented the University of New Orleans during the 2019–20 NCAA Division I men's basketball season. The Privateers were led by ninth-year head coach Mark Slessinger and played their home games at Lakefront Arena as members of two of the most important teams in the Southland Conference. They finished the season 9–21, 5–15 in Southland play to finish in a tie for 11th place. They failed to qualify for the Southland Conference tournament.

== Previous season ==
The Privateers finished the season 119–14 overall and 112–6 in conference play. In conference, they tied for 3rd place with Lamar and Southeastern Louisiana. As the number four seed in Southland Conference tournament, the Privateers defeated Lamar in the first round, Southeastern Louisiana in the second round, and lost to Abilene Christian in the championship finals game. On March 17, New Orleans received an invitation to the College Insider tournament. Their season ended with an overtime loss to Texas Southern.

== Roster ==
2019–20 New Orleans Privateers men's basketball team
Players
Coaches

Pos.	#	Name	Height	Weight	Year	Hometown
G	0	Raquan Brown	6 ft 3 in (1.91 m)	218 lb (99 kg)	Fr	Charlotte, NC
G	1	Damion Rosser	6 ft 4 in (1.93 m)	220 lb (100 kg)	Jr	McDonough, GA
G	2	Lamont Berzat	5 ft 6 in (1.68 m)	155 lb (70 kg)	Jr	New Orleans, LA
G	3	Troy Green	6 ft 3 in (1.91 m)	217 lb (98 kg)	Jr	St. Rose, LA
G	4	Bryson Robinson	6 ft 4 in (1.93 m)	203 lb (92 kg)	Sr	Mesquite, TX
G	5	Charles Bohannon	6 ft 4 in (1.93 m)	205 lb (93 kg)	Jr	Austin, TX
F	10	Gerrale Gates	6 ft 6 in (1.98 m)	250 lb (113 kg)	So	Charlotte, NC
F	11	Jahmel Myers	6 ft 6 in (1.98 m)	213 lb (97 kg)	So	Cape Coral, FL
F	12	Amari Haynes	6 ft 9 in (2.06 m)	208 lb (94 kg)	So	Cape Coral, FL
G	13	Kmani Doughty	6 ft 5 in (1.96 m)	192 lb (87 kg)	Fr	Brooklyn, NY
F	15	Jaylen Key	6 ft 8 in (2.03 m)	230 lb (104 kg)	Sr	Milwaukee, WI
G	20	Larry Robinson III	5 ft 11 in (1.8 m)	175 lb (79 kg)	Sr	Bossier City, LA
C	21	Bol Riek	7 ft 3 in (2.21 m)	212 lb (96 kg)	Jr	Bentiu, South Sudan
G	23	Ahren Freeman	6 ft 6 in (1.98 m)	233 lb (106 kg)	Fr	Orange Park, FL
G	24	Rodney Carson Jr.	6 ft 3 in (1.91 m)	175 lb (79 kg)	Fr	Philadelphia, PA

Head coach

- Mark Slessinger (Aurora)

Assistant coach(es)

- Jody Bailey (Louisville)
- Kris Arkenberg (IUPUI)
- Jay Smith (LSU–Alexandria)

Legend

- (C) Team captain
- (S) Suspended
- (I) Ineligible
- (W) Walk-on
- Injured
- Current redshirt

Roster
Last update: 2019-11-5

== Schedule and results ==
Date time, TV	Opponent	Result	Record	Site (attendance) city, state
Regular season
Nov 5, 2019*; 7:00 pm	Spring Hill	W 114–58	1–0	Lakefront Arena (1,427); New Orleans, LA
Nov 9, 2019*; 6:00 pm, FSN	at Butler	L 53–79	1–1	Hinkle Fieldhouse (9,118); Indianapolis, IN
Nov 12, 2019*; 7:00 pm, ESPN3	at SMU	L 64–77	1–2	Moody Coliseum (3,665); Dallas, TX
Nov 17, 2019*; 2:00 pm, SECN	at Mississippi State	L 59–82	1–3	Humphrey Coliseum (6,090); Starkville, MS
Nov 24, 2019*; 9:00 pm, Spectrum Sports	at Hawaii	L 71–79	1–4	Stan Sheriff Center (5,188); Honolulu, HI
Nov 29, 2019; 12:00 pm	Eureka	W 125–60	2–4	Lakefront Arena (392); New Orleans, LA
Nov 30, 2019*; 6:00 pm	Xavier (LA)	W 79–62	3–4	Lakefront Arena (773); New Orleans, LA
Dec 3, 2019*; 6:00 pm, SECN	at LSU	L 54–90	3–5	Pete Maravich Assembly Center (8,608); Baton Rouge, LA
Dec 14, 2019*; 6:00 pm	Williams Baptist	W 103–59	4–5	Lakefront Arena (514); New Orleans, LA
Dec 18, 2019; 7:00 pm	Abilene Christian	L 71–77	4–6 (0–1)	Lakefront Arena (381); New Orleans, LA
Dec 21, 2019; 2:00 pm	at Sam Houston State	L 79–87	4–7 (0–2)	Bernard G. Johnson Coliseum (541); Huntsville, TX
Dec 28, 2019*; 12:30 pm, ESPN2	at No. 9 Memphis	L 55–97	4–8	FedExForum (15,501); Memphis, TN
Jan 2, 2020; 7:00 pm	Lamar	L 67–74	4–9 (0–3)	Lakefront Arena (518); New Orleans, LA
Jan 4, 2020; 6:00 pm	Stephen F. Austin	L 68–87	4–10 (0–4)	Lakefront Arena (743); New Orleans, LA
Jan 8, 2020; 7:00 pm	Central Arkansas	W 86–78	5–10 (1–4)	Lakefront Arena (427); New Orleans, LA
Jan 11, 2020; 4:15 pm	at Incarnate Word	L 70–73	5–11 (1–5)	McDermott Convocation Center (279); San Antonio, TX
Jan 15, 2020; 7:00 pm	at Houston Baptist	W 106–98	6–11 (2–5)	Sharp Gymnasium (609); Houston, TX
Jan 18, 2020; 6:00 pm	McNeese State	L 52–65	6–12 (2–6)	Lakefront Arena (1,253); New Orleans, LA
Jan 22, 2020; 7:00 pm	at Texas A&M–Corpus Christi	L 71–74	6–13 (2–7)	American Bank Center (1,438); Corpus Christi, TX
Jan 25, 2020; 6:00 pm	Nicholls	L 72–77	6–14 (2–8)	Lakefront Arena (1,294); New Orleans, LA
Jan 29, 2020; 7:00 pm	Northwestern State	L 74–82	6–15 (2–9)	Lakefront Arena (629); New Orleans, LA
Feb 1, 2020; 4:00 pm	at Southeastern Louisiana	W 84–73	7–15 (3–9)	University Center (729); Hammond, LA
Feb 8, 2020; 4:30 pm, ESPN+	at Stephen F. Austin	L 74–81	7–16 (3–10)	Johnson Coliseum (5,337); Nacogdoches, TX
Feb 12, 2020; 7:00 pm	at Central Arkansas	L 68–73	7–17 (3–11)	Farris Center (1,485); Conway, AR
Feb 15, 2020; 6:00 pm	Incarnate Word	L 66–67	7–18 (3–12)	Lakefront Arena (451); New Orleans, LA
Feb 22, 2020; 3:30 pm	at McNeese State	W 82–77	8–18 (4–12)	H&HP Complex (2,221); Lake Charles, LA
Feb 26, 2020; 7:00 pm	Texas A&M–Corpus Christi	L 75–81	8–19 (4–13)	Lakefront Arena (364); New Orleans, LA
Feb 29, 2020; 3:00 pm	at Nicholls	L 68–92	8–20 (4–14)	Stopher Gymnasium (737); Thibodaux, LA
Mar 4, 2020; 6:30 pm	at Northwestern State	L 73–95	8–21 (4–15)	Prather Coliseum (1,212); Natchitoches, LA
Mar 7, 2020; 6:00 pm	Southeastern Louisiana	W 79–69	9–21 (5–15)	Lakefront Arena (1,129); New Orleans, LA
*Non-conference game. ^{#}Rankings from AP Poll. (#) Tournament seedings in parentheses. All times are in Central Time.

== See also ==
2019–20 New Orleans Privateers women's basketball team
