= Vincent Holmes =

American basketball player

Personal information
- Born: July 1, 1996 (age 30) Jupiter, Florida
- Listed height: 6 ft 4 in (1.93 m)
- Listed weight: 185 lb (84 kg)

Career information
- High school: Oxbridge Academy of the Palm Beaches (West Palm Beach, Florida); IMG Academy (Bradenton, Florida)
- College: Otero JC (2015–2016); James Madison (2016–2017); Lamar (2018–2020)
- NBA draft: 2020: undrafted
- Position: Point guard / shooting guard

Vincent Holmes (also known as V.J. Holmes or Vince Holmes, born July 1, 1996) is an American basketball player. As an NCAA Division I men's basketball player, he has played for the Lamar Cardinals from 2018 to 2020. He went undrafted in the 2020 NBA draft. Holmes was coached by Lamar Cardinals head coach Tic Price and assistant coach Brandon Chappell.

== Early life ==
Holmes was born in Jupiter, Florida and attended the Oxbridge Academy of the Palm Beaches, where he played for the school's basketball team from 2013–14. While at Oxbridge Academy, Holmes averaged 18.5 points per game scoring a high of 24 points in the divisional playoff game, leading the team to its first ever conference championship. He holds the title of Leading Scorer in a single season 2013–2014. Holmes also received Player of the Game awards from 2013–14, and was named to the All-County Team and as Defensive Player of the Year. From 2014–2015, Holmes played for IMG Academy.

== College career ==
Holmes played for Otero Junior College from 2015–16. While at Otero Junior College, he was named to the All-conference Tournament Team and lead the team to its first ever top 10 NJCAA national ranking. After playing for the men's basketball team at Otero Junior College, Holmes played for the 2016–17 James Madison Dukes men's basketball team. After the season, he transferred to the Lamar Cardinals. Along with T. J. Atwood, he was one of Lamar's top scorers during their 2019–20 season. Holmes was coached by Lamar Cardinals head coach Tic Price and assistant coach Brandon Chappell.

== Statistics ==
Statistics for Holmes:

Legend
GP	Games played	MPG	Minutes per game	FG%	Field goal percentage
3P%	3-point field goal percentage	FT%	Free throw percentage	RPG	Rebounds per game
APG	Assists per game	SPG	Steals per game	BPG	Blocks per game
PPG	Points per game	**Bold**	Career high		Led the league

NCAA Division I

Year	Team	League	GP	MPG	FG%	3P%	FT%	RPG	APG	SPG	BPG	PPG
2016–17	James Madison Dukes	Southland	25	12.8	0.300	0.000	0.667	1.6	1.2	0.2	0.2	1.4
2018–19	Lamar Cardinals	Southland	33	24.2	0.424	0.185	0.561	3.0	2.6	1.2	0.6	5.1
2019–20	Lamar Cardinals	Southland	31	30.4	0.437	0.294	0.717	3.7	4.8	2.2	0.3	10.2

High school and junior college

Year	Team	League	GP	MPG	FG%	3P%	FT%	RPG	APG	SPG	BPG	PPG
2013–14	Oxbridge		23		0.51	0.33	0.59	3.5	6.0	2.9	0.7	18.3
2015–16	Otero		27	25.0	0.429	0.250	0.720	5.0	6.0	1.6	0.7	10.2

== See also ==
- 2019–20 Lamar Cardinals basketball team
- 2018–19 Lamar Cardinals basketball team
- 2017–18 Lamar Cardinals basketball team
- 2016–17 James Madison Dukes men's basketball team
