= 2019–20 Houston Baptist Huskies men's basketball team =

American college basketball season

2019–20 Houston Baptist Huskies men's basketball
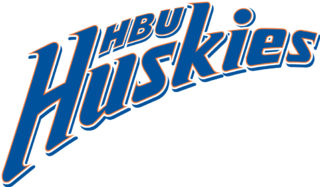
- Conference: Southland Conference
- Record: 4–25 (4–16 Southland)
- Head coach: Ron Cottrell (29th season)
- Assistant coaches: Steven Key; Jud Kinne; Keith Berard
- Home arena: Sharp Gymnasium

2019–20 Southland Conference men's basketball standings
| | Conf. | | | | Overall |
| Team | W | | L | PCT | W | | L | PCT |
|---|---|---|---|---|---|---|---|---|
| Stephen F. Austin | 19 | – | 1 | .950 | 28 | – | 3 | .903 |
| Abilene Christian | 15 | – | 5 | .750 | 20 | – | 11 | .645 |
| Nicholls | 15 | – | 5 | .750 | 21 | – | 10 | .677 |
| Sam Houston State | 11 | – | 9 | .550 | 18 | – | 13 | .581 |
| Northwestern State | 11 | – | 9 | .550 | 15 | – | 15 | .500 |
| Lamar | 10 | – | 10 | .500 | 17 | – | 15 | .531 |
| McNeese State | 10 | – | 10 | .500 | 15 | – | 17 | .469 |
| Texas A&M–CC | 10 | – | 10 | .500 | 14 | – | 18 | .438 |
| Central Arkansas | 9 | – | 11 | .450 | 10 | – | 21 | .323 |
| Incarnate Word | 6 | – | 14 | .300 | 9 | – | 22 | .290 |
| New Orleans | 5 | – | 15 | .250 | 9 | – | 21 | .300 |
| Southeastern Louisiana | 5 | – | 15 | .250 | 8 | – | 23 | .258 |
| Houston Baptist | 4 | – | 16 | .200 | 4 | – | 25 | .138 |
Note: The 2020 SLC tournament was canceled after the first round due to the COVID-19 pandemic.

The 2019–20 Houston Baptist Huskies men's basketball team represented Houston Baptist University in the 2019–20 NCAA Division I men's basketball season. The Huskies, led by 29th-year head coach Ron Cottrell, played their home games at Sharp Gymnasium in Houston, Texas as members of the Southland Conference. They finished the season 4–25, 4–16 in Southland play to finish in last place. They failed to qualify for the Southland Conference tournament.

== Previous season ==
The Huskies finished the 2018–19 season 12–18 overall, 8–10 in Southland play, to finish in a tie for seventh place. In the Southland tournament, they were defeated by Lamar in the first round.

== Roster ==
2019–20 Houston Baptist Huskies men's basketball team
Players
Coaches

| Pos. | # | Name | Height | Weight | Year | Hometown |
|---|---|---|---|---|---|---|
| G | 0 | Ian DuBose | 6 ft 4 in (1.93 m) | 210 lb (95 kg) | Jr | Durham, North Carolina |
| G | 2 | Qon Murphy | 6 ft 5 in (1.96 m) | 190 lb (86 kg) | So | Cornelius, North Carolina |
| F | 3 | Jackson Stent | 6 ft 8 in (2.03 m) | 215 lb (98 kg) | Sr | Christchurch, New Zealand |
| G | 4 | Myles Pierre | 6 ft 2 in (1.88 m) | 190 lb (86 kg) | Fr | Charlotte, North Carolina |
| G | 5 | Hunter Janacek | 6 ft 5 in (1.96 m) | 185 lb (84 kg) | Jr | Houston, Texas |
| G/F | 10 | Ty Dalton | 6 ft 4 in (1.93 m) | 215 lb (98 kg) | Jr | Houston, Texas |
| F | 11 | Jason Thompson | 6 ft 7 in (2.01 m) | 195 lb (88 kg) | Fr | Charlotte, North Carolina |
| F | 13 | Philip McKenzie | 6 ft 5 in (1.96 m) | 205 lb (93 kg) | Jr | Nassau, Bahamas |
| G | 14 | Andre Charles Jr. | 6 ft 0 in (1.83 m) | 170 lb (77 kg) | So | Houston, Texas |
| F | 20 | Nick Jones | 6 ft 6 in (1.98 m) | 205 lb (93 kg) | Jr | Houston, Texas |
| G | 21 | Noah Thomasson | 6 ft 3 in (1.91 m) | 180 lb (82 kg) | Fr | Richmond, Texas |
| G | 22 | Jalon Gates | 6 ft 0 in (1.83 m) | 160 lb (73 kg) | Sr | Selma, Texas |
| F | 32 | Benjamin Uloko | 6 ft 7 in (2.01 m) | 265 lb (120 kg) | So | Clemmons, North Carolina |
| C | 34 | Zach Iyeyemi | 6 ft 9 in (2.06 m) | 280 lb (127 kg) | Fr | Cypress, Texas |
| C | 50 | Ryan Gomes | 6 ft 10 in (2.08 m) | 250 lb (113 kg) | Jr | Westminster, Maryland |

Head coach

- Ron Cottrell (Arkansas)

Assistant coach(es)

- Steven Key (Houston Baptist)
- Jud Kinne (Albion)
- Keith Berard (Southern Utah)

Legend

- (C) Team captain
- (S) Suspended
- (I) Ineligible
- (W) Walk-on
- Injured
- Current redshirt

Roster
Last update: November 26, 2019

== Schedule and results ==
| Date time, TV | Opponent | Result | Record | Site (attendance) city, state |
Regular season
| November 5, 2019*; 12:00 pm, ESPN3 | at Tulsa | L 72–80 | 0–1 | Reynolds Center (5,607); Tulsa, OK |
| November 8, 2019*; 7:30 pm | at Oral Roberts | L 81–95 | 0–2 | Mabee Center (2,159); Tulsa, OK |
| November 13, 2019*; 7:00 pm | at No. 11 Texas Tech | L 74–103 | 0–3 | Chaparral Center (4,535); Midland, TX |
| November 22, 2019*; 6:00 pm, BTN+ | at Michigan | L 68–111 | 0–4 | Crisler Center (12,707); Ann Arbor, MI |
| November 26, 2019*; 7:00 pm, ESPN3 | at Houston | L 73–112 | 0–5 | Fertitta Center (5,862); Houston, TX |
| December 3, 2019*; 6:00 pm | at No. 19 Dayton | L 68–99 | 0–6 | UD Arena (13,166); Dayton, OH |
| December 7, 2019*; 7:00 pm | Samford | L 90–113 | 0–7 | Sharp Gymnasium (605); Houston, TX |
| December 14, 2019*; 7:00 pm | at Rice | L 84–96 | 0–8 | Tudor Fieldhouse (1,725); Houston, TX |
| December 18, 2019; 6:30 pm, ESPN3 | at Stephen F. Austin | L 68–96 | 0–9 (0–1) | William R. Johnson Coliseum (2,357); Nacogdoches, TX |
| December 22, 2019*; 1:30 pm | at New Mexico | L 88–107 | 0–10 | The Pit (10,423); Albuquerque, NM |
| January 2, 2020; 7:00 pm | Central Arkansas | W 111–107 ^{OT} | 1–10 (1–1) | Sharp Gymnasium (529); Houston, TX |
| January 5, 2020; 4:00 pm | at Northwestern State | L 79–106 | 1–11 (1–2) | Prather Coliseum (767); Natchitoches, LA |
| January 11, 2020; 7:00 pm | Lamar | L 92–102 | 1–12 (1–3) | Sharp Gymnasium (684); Houston, TX |
| January 15, 2020; 7:00 pm | New Orleans | L 98–106 | 1–13 (1–4) | Sharp Gymnasium (609); Houston, TX |
| January 18, 2020; 7:00 pm | Sam Houston State | L 75–95 | 1–14 (1–5) | Sharp Gymnasium (921); Houston, TX |
| January 22, 2020; 7:00 pm | at Nicholls | L 83–91 | 1–15 (1–6) | Stopher Gymnasium (1,137); Thibodaux, LA |
| January 25, 2020; 3:30 pm | at McNeese State | L 89–102 | 1–16 (1–7) | H&HP Complex (3,214); Lake Charles, LA |
| January 29, 2020; 7:00 pm | Incarnate Word | L 82–84 | 1–17 (1–8) | Sharp Gymnasium (506); Houston, TX |
| February 1, 2020; 7:00 pm | Texas A&M–Corpus Christi | W 82–77 | 2–17 (2–8) | Sharp Gymnasium (802); Houston, TX |
| February 5, 2020; 7:00 pm | at Southeastern Louisiana | W 79–76 | 3–17 (3–8) | University Center (858); Hammond, LA |
| February 8, 2020; 7:00 pm | Northwestern State | L 79–93 | 3–18 (3–9) | Sharp Gymnasium (889); Houston, TX |
| February 12, 2020; 7:30 pm, ESPN+ | at Abilene Christian | L 67–81 | 3–19 (3–10) | Moody Coliseum (1,124); Abilene, TX |
| February 15, 2020; 2:00 pm, ESPN3 | at Lamar | L 69–79 | 3–20 (3–11) | Montagne Center (1,664); Beaumont, TX |
| February 19, 2020; 7:00 pm | Abilene Christian | L 68–82 | 3–21 (3–12) | Sharp Gymnasium (590); Houston, TX |
| February 22, 2020; 5:30 pm, ESPN+ | at Sam Houston State | L 73–77 | 3–22 (3–13) | Bernard Johnson Coliseum (2,049); Huntsville, TX |
| February 26, 2020; 7:00 pm | Nicholls | L 85–93 | 3–23 (3–14) | Sharp Gymnasium (595); Houston, TX |
| February 29, 2020; 7:00 pm | McNeese State | L 80–100 | 3–24 (3–15) | Sharp Gymnasium (853); Houston, TX |
| March 4, 2020; 7:00 pm | at Incarnate Word | W 88–76 | 4–24 (4–15) | McDermott Center (343); San Antonio, TX |
| March 7, 2020; 3:30 pm | at Texas A&M–Corpus Christi | L 78–84 | 4–25 (4–16) | American Bank Center (1,637); Corpus Christi, TX |
*Non-conference game. ^{#}Rankings from AP Poll. (#) Tournament seedings in parentheses. All times are in Central.

== See also ==
2019–20 Houston Baptist Huskies women's basketball team
