= 2019–20 Sam Houston State Bearkats men's basketball team =

American college basketball season

2019–20 Sam Houston State Bearkats men's basketball
- Conference: Southland Conference
- Record: 18–13 (11–9 Southland)
- Head coach: Jason Hooten (10th season)
- Assistant coaches: Phil Forte (1st season); Chris Mudge (10th season); Andre Owens (1st season)
- Home arena: Bernard Johnson Coliseum (Capacity: 6,110)

2019–20 Southland Conference men's basketball standings
	Conf.				Overall
Team	W		L	PCT	W		L	PCT
Stephen F. Austin	19	–	1	.950	28	–	3	.903
Abilene Christian	15	–	5	.750	20	–	11	.645
Nicholls	15	–	5	.750	21	–	10	.677
Sam Houston State	11	–	9	.550	18	–	13	.581
Northwestern State	11	–	9	.550	15	–	15	.500
Lamar	10	–	10	.500	17	–	15	.531
McNeese State	10	–	10	.500	15	–	17	.469
Texas A&M–CC	10	–	10	.500	14	–	18	.438
Central Arkansas	9	–	11	.450	10	–	21	.323
Incarnate Word	6	–	14	.300	9	–	22	.290
New Orleans	5	–	15	.250	9	–	21	.300
Southeastern Louisiana	5	–	15	.250	8	–	23	.258
Houston Baptist	4	–	16	.200	4	–	25	.138
Note: The 2020 SLC tournament was canceled after the first round due to the COVID-19 pandemic.

The 2019–20 Sam Houston State Bearkats men's basketball team represented Sam Houston State University in the 2019–20 NCAA Division I men's basketball season. The Bearkats, led by tenth-year head coach Jason Hooten, played their home games at the Bernard Johnson Coliseum in Huntsville, Texas as members of the Southland Conference. They finished the season 18–13, 11–9 in Southland play to finish in a tie for fourth place. They were set to on Northwestern State in the second round of the Southland tournament until the tournament was cancelled amid the COVID-19 pandemic.

== Previous season ==
The Bearkats finished the 2018–19 season 21–12 overall, 16–2 in Southland play, to finish as Southland Conference regular season champions. In the Southland tournament, they were upset by New Orleans in the semifinals. As a regular season league champion who failed to win their league tournament, they received an automatic bid to the NIT, where they lost to TCU in the first round.

== Roster ==
2019–20 Sam Houston State Bearkats men's basketball team
Players
Coaches

Pos.	#	Name	Height	Weight	Year	Hometown
F/C	0	Bubba Furlong	6 ft 9 in (2.06 m)	240 lb (109 kg)	Jr	Waco, Texas
F	1	RJ Smith	6 ft 5 in (1.96 m)	220 lb (100 kg)	RS Jr	Olathe, Kansas
G	2	Dajuan Jones	5 ft 10 in (1.78 m)	165 lb (75 kg)	RS So	Killeen, Texas
G	3	Demarkus Lampley	6 ft 2 in (1.88 m)	170 lb (77 kg)	Jr	Phenix City, Alabama
G	4	Chad Bowie	6 ft 4 in (1.93 m)	205 lb (93 kg)	Sr	Houston, Texas
G	5	Terryonte Thomas	6 ft 4 in (1.93 m)	205 lb (93 kg)	Jr	Columbus, Mississippi
G	10	Zach Nutall	6 ft 3 in (1.91 m)	185 lb (84 kg)	So	Bryan, Texas
G	11	Xavier Bryant	6 ft 0 in (1.83 m)	180 lb (82 kg)	So	DeSoto, Texas
G	12	Pierce Hellums	6 ft 2 in (1.88 m)	170 lb (77 kg)	Fr	Tomball, Texas
G	13	Dainan Swoope	6 ft 0 in (1.83 m)	185 lb (84 kg)	GS	Overland Park, Kansas
F/C	14	Kai Mitchell	6 ft 7 in (2.01 m)	245 lb (111 kg)	Sr	Haverstraw, New York
F	15	Mark Tikhonenko	6 ft 10 in (2.08 m)	240 lb (109 kg)	RS So	Moscow, Russia
G	20	Cade Kortan	6 ft 0 in (1.83 m)	185 lb (84 kg)	Fr	College Station, Texas
G	24	DJ Kelley	6 ft 3 in (1.91 m)	225 lb (102 kg)	Fr	Cantonment, Florida
F	54	Cyrus Johnson	6 ft 5 in (1.96 m)	220 lb (100 kg)	RS Fr	Culver City, California

Head coach

- Jason Hooten (Tarleton State)

Assistant coach(es)

- Phil Forte (Oklahoma State)
- Chris Mudge (Texas)
- Andre Owens (Texas–San Antonio)

Legend

- (C) Team captain
- (S) Suspended
- (I) Ineligible
- (W) Walk-on
- Injured
- Current redshirt

Roster
Last update: November 27, 2019

== Schedule and results ==
Date time, TV	Rank^{#}	Opponent^{#}	Result	Record	Site (attendance) city, state
Regular season
November 5, 2019*; 6:30 pm, ESPN3		Paul Quinn	W 95–57	1–0	Bernard Johnson Coliseum (1,087); Huntsville, TX
November 8, 2019*; 7:00 pm, SECN+		at Mississippi State	L 58–67	1–1	Humphrey Coliseum (6,255); Starkville, MS
November 16, 2019*; 1:00 pm, ESPN3		at Central Michigan	L 77–84	1–2	McGuirk Arena (1,683); Mount Pleasant, MI
November 20, 2019*; 6:30 pm, ESPN3		LeTourneau	W 88–58	2–2	Bernard Johnson Coliseum (1,115); Huntsville, TX
November 23, 2019*; 7:00 pm		at San Francisco	L 81–90	2–3	War Memorial Gymnasium (1,705); San Francisco, CA
November 26, 2019*; 9:30 pm, ESPN+		at Cal State Bakersfield	W 74–65	3–3	Icardo Center (2,207); Bakersfield, CA
November 30, 2019*; 2:00 pm		Randall	W 86–51	4–3	Bernard Johnson Coliseum (515); Huntsville, TX
December 3, 2019*; 7:00 pm, WAC Digital Network		at Texas–Rio Grande Valley	L 86–90 ^{2OT}	4–4	UTRGV Fieldhouse (1,196); Edinburg, TX
December 8, 2019*; 4:30 pm, ESPN+		Louisiana Tech	W 71–68	5–4	Bernard Johnson Coliseum (713); Huntsville, TX
December 15, 2019*; 4:30 pm		Wiley College	W 91–58	6–4	Bernard Johnson Coliseum (480); Huntsville, TX
December 18, 2019; 6:30 pm		Northwestern State	W 92–79	7–4 (1–0)	Bernard Johnson Coliseum (650); Huntsville, TX
December 21, 2019; 2:00 pm		New Orleans	W 87–79	8–4 (2–0)	Bernard Johnson Coliseum (541); Huntsville, TX
December 29, 2019*; 2:00 pm, CUSA.TV		at Rice	W 75–61	9–4	Tudor Fieldhouse (1,763); Houston, TX
January 2, 2020; 7:30 pm		at McNeese State	W 94–75	10–4 (3–0)	H&HP Complex (2,461); Lake Charles, LA
January 4, 2020; 5:30 pm		Nicholls	L 58–70	10–5 (3–1)	Bernard Johnson Coliseum (767); Huntsville, TX
January 8, 2020; 6:30 pm		Southeastern Louisiana	W 67–62	11–5 (4–1)	Bernard Johnson Coliseum (646); Huntsville, TX
January 11, 2020; 3:00 pm		at Central Arkansas	L 82–89	11–6 (4–2)	Farris Center (879); Conway, AR
January 15, 2020; 7:00 pm, ESPN+		at Lamar	W 80–75 ^{OT}	12–6 (5–2)	Montagne Center (1,952); Beaumont, TX
January 18, 2020; 7:00 pm		at Houston Baptist	W 95–75	13–6 (6–2)	Sharp Gymnasium (921); Houston, TX
January 22, 2020; 7:30 pm, ESPN+		Abilene Christian	W 82–76 ^{OT}	14–6 (7–2)	Bernard Johnson Coliseum (1,197); Huntsville, TX
January 29, 2020; 6:30 pm, ESPN+		Texas A&M–Corpus Christi	W 80–61	15–6 (8–2)	Bernard Johnson Coliseum (1,029); Huntsville, TX
February 1, 2020; 5:30 pm, ESPN3		Stephen F. Austin	L 76–81	15–7 (8–3)	Bernard Johnson Coliseum (2,889); Huntsville, TX
February 5, 2020; 7:00 pm		at Incarnate Word	L 71–72 ^{OT}	15–8 (8–4)	McDermott Center (452); San Antonio, TX
February 8, 2020; 3:00 pm		at Nicholls	L 82–88	15–9 (8–5)	Stopher Gymnasium (743); Thibodaux, LA
February 12, 2020; 7:00 pm		at Southeastern Louisiana	W 79–70	16–9 (9–5)	University Center (620); Hammond, LA
February 15, 2020; 3:30 pm, ESPN3		Central Arkansas	W 82–67	17–9 (10–5)	Bernard Johnson Coliseum (775); Huntsville, TX
February 19, 2020; 6:30 pm, ESPN+		Lamar	L 65–77	17–10 (10–6)	Bernard Johnson Coliseum (896); Huntsville, TX
February 22, 2020; 5:30 pm, ESPN+		Houston Baptist	W 77–73	18–10 (11–6)	Bernard Johnson Coliseum (2,049); Huntsville, TX
February 26, 2020; 7:30 pm, ESPN+		at Abilene Christian	L 69–85	18–11 (11–7)	Moody Coliseum (1,439); Abilene, TX
March 4, 2020; 7:00 pm		at Texas A&M–Corpus Christi	L 60–71	18–12 (11–8)	American Bank Center (1,202); Corpus Christi, TX
March 7, 2020; 4:30 pm, ESPN+		at Stephen F. Austin	L 57–68	18–13 (11–9)	William R. Johnson Coliseum (4,631); Nacogdoches, TX
Southland tournament
March 12, 2020; 5:00 pm, ESPN+	(4)	vs. (5) Northwestern State; Second round	Cancelled due to the COVID-19 pandemic		Merrell Center; Katy, TX
*Non-conference game. ^{#}Rankings from AP Poll. (#) Tournament seedings in parentheses. All times are in Central.

== See also ==
- 2019–20 Sam Houston State Bearkats women's basketball team
