= 2019–20 Incarnate Word Cardinals men's basketball team =

2019–20 Incarnate Word Cardinals men's basketball
- Conference: Southland Conference
- Record: 9–22 (6–14 Southland)
- Head coach: Carson Cunningham (2nd season)
- Assistant coaches: Kenyon Spears (3rd season); Taylor Land (2nd season); Ryne Smith (1st season)
- Home arena: McDermott Center (Capacity: 2,000)

2019–20 Southland Conference men's basketball standings
	Conf.				Overall
Team	W		L	PCT	W		L	PCT
Stephen F. Austin	19	–	1	.950	28	–	3	.903
Abilene Christian	15	–	5	.750	20	–	11	.645
Nicholls	15	–	5	.750	21	–	10	.677
Sam Houston State	11	–	9	.550	18	–	13	.581
Northwestern State	11	–	9	.550	15	–	15	.500
Lamar	10	–	10	.500	17	–	15	.531
McNeese State	10	–	10	.500	15	–	17	.469
Texas A&M–CC	10	–	10	.500	14	–	18	.438
Central Arkansas	9	–	11	.450	10	–	21	.323
Incarnate Word	6	–	14	.300	9	–	22	.290
New Orleans	5	–	15	.250	9	–	21	.300
Southeastern Louisiana	5	–	15	.250	8	–	23	.258
Houston Baptist	4	–	16	.200	4	–	25	.138
Note: The 2020 SLC tournament was canceled after the first round due to the COVID-19 pandemic.

The 2019–20 Incarnate Word Cardinals men's basketball team represented the University of the Incarnate Word during the 2019–20 NCAA Division I men's basketball season. The Cardinals were led by second-year head coach Carson Cunningham and played their home games at McDermott Convocation Center in San Antonio, Texas as members of the Southland Conference. They finished the season 10–21, 6–14 in Southland play to finish in tenth place. They failed to qualify for the Southland tournament.

== Previous season ==
The Cardinals finished the 2018–19 season 6–25, 1–17 in Southland play to finish in 13th place. They failed to qualify for the Southland tournament.

== Roster ==
2019–20 Incarnate Word Cardinals men's basketball team
Players
Coaches

Pos.	#	Name	Height	Weight	Year	Previous school	Hometown
G	0	Dwight Murray, Jr.	6 ft 0 in (1.83 m)	165 lb (75 kg)	So	Pebblebrook HS	Austell, Georgia
F	1	Antoine Smith Jr.	6 ft 7 in (2.01 m)	215 lb (98 kg)	So	Bosco Institute	Westerville, Ohio
G	2	Keaston Willis	6 ft 3 in (1.91 m)	180 lb (82 kg)	Fr	Sulphur Springs HS	Sulphur Springs, Texas
G	3	Drew Lutz	6 ft 1 in (1.85 m)	165 lb (75 kg)	Fr	Penn HS	Granger, Indiana
G/F	4	Derek Van Vlerah	6 ft 6 in (1.98 m)	175 lb (79 kg)	Fr	Dublin Coffman HS	Dublin, Ohio
G	5	Brandon Swaby	6 ft 3 in (1.91 m)	170 lb (77 kg)	RS Fr	Northeast HS	Fort Lauderdale, Florida
G	10	Cody Graham	5 ft 10 in (1.78 m)	165 lb (75 kg)	Jr	St. Pius X HS	Fresno, Texas
G	12	Augustine Ene	6 ft 4 in (1.93 m)	205 lb (93 kg)	Jr	Creekview HS	Carrollton, Texas
G	13	Ryan Flores	6 ft 5 in (1.96 m)	187 lb (85 kg)	Jr	Chisholm Trail HS	Saginaw, Texas
F	15	Marcus Larsson	6 ft 10 in (2.08 m)	207 lb (94 kg)	Fr	Froya Basket	Oslo, Norway
G	20	Morgan Taylor	6 ft 3 in (1.91 m)	174 lb (79 kg)	So	Marist HS	Chicago, Illinois
F	21	Corey Sato	6 ft 6 in (1.98 m)	190 lb (86 kg)	RS Fr	Randall HS	Amarillo, Texas
F	24	Bryce Davis	6 ft 7 in (2.01 m)	215 lb (98 kg)	So	Deer Valley HS	Glendale, Arizona
G	25	Des Balentine (C)	6 ft 0 in (1.83 m)	178 lb (81 kg)	RS Jr	Tyler JC	Kokomo, Indiana
F	33	Vincent Miszkiewicz	6 ft 7 in (2.01 m)	206 lb (93 kg)	Fr	South Elgin HS	South Elgin, Illinois

Head coach

- Carson Cunningham (Purdue)

Assistant coach(es)

- Kenyon Spears (Lamar)
- Taylor Land (St. Edward's)
- Ryne Smith (Purdue)
- Zach Taylor (Carroll College)

Legend

- (C) Team captain
- (S) Suspended
- (I) Ineligible
- (W) Walk-on
- Injured
- Current redshirt

Roster
Last update: 2019-11-06

== Schedule and results ==
Date time, TV	Opponent	Result	Record	High points	High rebounds	High assists	Site (attendance) city, state
Regular season
Nov 6, 2019*; 7:00 pm, SECN+	at Missouri	L 42–82	0–1	16 – Lutz	10 – Miszkiewicz	2 – Tied	Mizzou Arena (8,185); Columbia, MO
Nov 8, 2019*; 7:00 pm	at Northern Colorado	L 61–83	0–2	16 – Morgan	5 – Swaby	2 – Morgan	Bank of Colorado Arena (1,455); Greeley, CO
Nov 12, 2019*; 7:00 pm	Texas Lutheran	W 86–60	1–2	15 – Murray	8 – Ene	4 – Murray	McDermott Center (490); San Antonio, TX
Nov 16, 2019*; 1:00 pm	SIU Edwardsville	L 55–57	1–3	14 – Willis	12 – Miszkiewicz	5 – Lutz	McDermott Center (96); San Antonio, TX
Nov 22, 2019*; 12:00 pm	Bethune–Cookman	L 58–83	1–4	15 – Murray Jr.	12 – Miskiewicz	4 – Murray Jr.	McDermott Center (125); San Antonio, TX
Nov 23, 2019*; 10:00 am	St. Francis (IL)	W 68–44	2–4	14 – Davis	11 – Miszkiewicz	3 – Lutz	McDermott Center (213); San Antonio, TX
Nov 24, 2019*; 2:00 pm	Eastern Illinois	W 72–63	2–5	20 – Lutz	9 – Miszkiewicz	5 – Lutz	McDermott Center (349); San Antonio, TX
Dec 1, 2019*; 5:00 pm	at Portland	L 56–65	2–6	16 – Willis	6 – Tied	3 – Balentine	Chiles Center (1,088); Portland, OR
Dec 3, 2019*; 7:00 pm	at Seattle	L 60–81	2–7	14 – Willis	4 – Murray Jr.	3 – Lutz	Redhawk Center (820); Seattle, WA
Dec 7, 2019*; 7:00 pm	Trinity	W 101–65	3–7	19 – Tied	9 – Miszkiewicz	5 – Murray Jr.	McDermott Center (293); San Antonio, TX
Dec 18, 2019; 12:30 pm	at Central Arkansas	L 82–88	3–8 (0–1)	28 – Willis	8 – Murray	8 – Murray	Farris Center (426); Conway, AR
Dec 21, 2019*; 6:00 pm, P12N	at Washington State	L 59–87	3–9	10 – Murray	8 – Miszkiewicz	3 – Murray	Beasley Coliseum (2,037); Pullman, WA
Jan 2, 2020; 7:00 pm	at Nicholls	L 60–76	3–10 (0–2)	15 – Ene	6 – Lutz	3 – Miszkiewicz	Stopher Gymnasium (327); Thibodaux, LA
Jan 8, 2020; 7:00 pm	Northwestern State	L 60–76	3–11 (0–3)	16 – Willis	9 – Larsson	8 – Lutz	McDermott Center (124); San Antonio, TX
Jan 11, 2020; 4:15 pm	New Orleans	W 73–70	4–11 (1–3)	19 – Larsson	9 – Miszkiewicz	7 – Lutz	McDermott Center (279); San Antonio, TX
Jan 15, 2020; 6:30 pm	at McNeese State	L 56–72	4–12 (1–5)	15 – Lutz	13 – Miszkiewicz	3 – Murray	H&HP Complex (2,356); Lake Charles, LA
Jan 18, 2020; 4:30 pm, ESPN+	at Stephen F. Austin	L 56–80	4–13 (1–5)	16 – Lutz	9 – Miszkiewicz	6 – Lutz	William R. Johnson Coliseum (4,147); Nacogdoches, TX
Jan 22, 2020; 7:00 pm	Lamar	L 77–89	4–14 (1–6)	25 – Lutz	7 – Miszkiewicz	4 – Lutz	McDermott Center (310); San Antonio, TX
Jan 25, 2020; 4:15 pm	Texas A&M–Corpus Christi	L 47–68	4–15 (1–7)	15 – Ene	7 – Miszkiewicz	3 – Lutz	McDermott Center (444); San Antonio, TX
Jan 29, 2020; 7:00 pm	at Houston Baptist	W 84–82	5–15 (2–7)	23 – Willis	8 – Miszkiewicz	4 – Balentine	Sharp Gymnasium (506); Houston, TX
Feb 1, 2020; 3:30 pm, ESPN3	at Abilene Christian	L 58–72	5–16 (2–8)	11 – Miszkiewicz	9 – Miszkiewicz	1 – Balentine	Moody Coliseum (1,192); Abilene, TX
Feb 5, 2020; 7:00 pm	Sam Houston State	W 72–71 ^{OT}	6–16 (3–8)	17 – Lutz	9 – Miszkiewicz	5 – Lutz	McDermott Center (452); San Antonio, TX
Feb 8, 2020; 4:15 pm	Southeastern Louisiana	W 82–75	7–16 (4–8)	17 – Tied	6 – Van Vlerah	5 – Balentine	McDermott Center (477); San Antonio, TX
Feb 12, 2020; 6:30 pm	at Northwestern State	L 60–70	7–17 (4–9)	14 – Balentine	7 – Balentine	4 – Lutz	Prather Coliseum (802); Natchitoches, LA
Feb 15, 2020; 6:00 pm	at New Orleans	W 67–66	8–17 (5–9)	19 – Lutz	8 – Murray Jr.	7 – Lutz	Lakefront Arena (451); New Orleans, LA
Feb 19, 2020; 7:00 pm	McNeese State	W 65–59	9–17 (6–9)	23 – Willis	9 – Miszkiewicz	5 – Balentine	McDermott Center (409); San Antonio, TX
Feb 22, 2020; 4:15 pm	Stephen F. Austin	L 56–80	9–18 (6–10)	13 – Murray	6 – Mizskiewicz	4 – Lutz	McDermott Center (691); San Antonio, TX
Feb 26, 2020; 7:00 pm, ESPN+	at Lamar	L 66–86	9–19 (6–11)	23 – Murray Jr.	9 – Miszkiewicz	4 – Balentine	Montagne Center (1,755); Beaumont, TX
Feb 29, 2020; 5:30 pm, ESPN+	at Texas A&M–Corpus Christi	L 70–78	9–20 (6–12)	18 – Balentine	5 – Murray	5 – Murray	American Bank Center (2,678); Corpus Christi, TX
Mar 4, 2020; 7:00 pm	Houston Baptist	L 76–88	9–21 (6–13)	23 – Willis	5 – Tied	6 – Lutz	McDermott Center (343); San Antonio Texas
Mar 7, 2020; 4:15 pm	Abilene Christian	L 68–71 ^{OT}	9–22 (6–14)	16 – Lutz	9 – Larsson	4 – Balentine	McDermott Center (831); San Antonio, TX
*Non-conference game. ^{#}Rankings from AP Poll. (#) Tournament seedings in parentheses. All times are in Central Time.

== See also ==
2019–20 Incarnate Word Cardinals women's basketball team
