= 2019–20 Southeastern Louisiana Lions basketball team =

American college basketball season

2019–20 Southeastern Louisiana Lions basketball
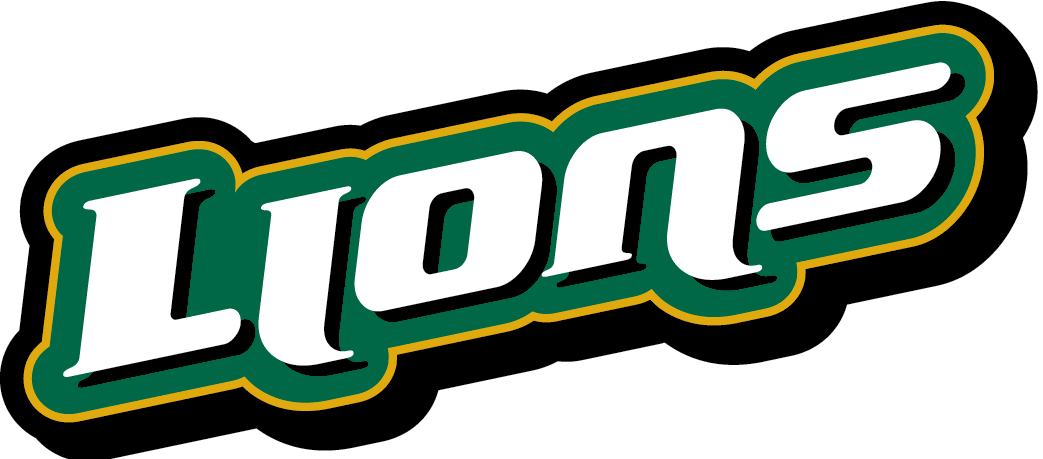
- Conference: Southland Conference
- Record: 8–23 (5–15 Southland)
- Head coach: David Kiefer (1st season)
- Assistant coaches: Mark Lieberman; Jordan Brooks; Patrick Schulte
- Home arena: University Center (Capacity: 7,500)

2019–20 Southland Conference men's basketball standings
	Conf.				Overall
Team	W		L	PCT	W		L	PCT
Stephen F. Austin	19	–	1	.950	28	–	3	.903
Abilene Christian	15	–	5	.750	20	–	11	.645
Nicholls	15	–	5	.750	21	–	10	.677
Sam Houston State	11	–	9	.550	18	–	13	.581
Northwestern State	11	–	9	.550	15	–	15	.500
Lamar	10	–	10	.500	17	–	15	.531
McNeese State	10	–	10	.500	15	–	17	.469
Texas A&M–CC	10	–	10	.500	14	–	18	.438
Central Arkansas	9	–	11	.450	10	–	21	.323
Incarnate Word	6	–	14	.300	9	–	22	.290
New Orleans	5	–	15	.250	9	–	21	.300
Southeastern Louisiana	5	–	15	.250	8	–	23	.258
Houston Baptist	4	–	16	.200	4	–	25	.138
Note: The 2020 SLC tournament was canceled after the first round due to the COVID-19 pandemic.

The 2019–20 Southeastern Louisiana Lions basketball team represented Southeastern Louisiana University during the 2019–20 NCAA Division I men's basketball season. The Lions were led by first-year head coach David Kiefer, and played their home games at the University Center in Hammond, Louisiana as members of the Southland Conference. They finished the season 8–23, 5–15 in Southland play to finish in a tie for 11th place. They failed to qualify for the Southland Conference tournament.

== Previous season ==
They finished the season 17–16 overall, 12–6 in Southland play to finish in a three-way tie for third place. As the No. 3 seed in the Southland tournament, they advanced to the semifinals, where they lost to Abilene Christian. Head coach Jay Ladner left at the conclusion of the season to become head coach at Southern Miss. Former Lion assistant David Kiefer was hired as his replacement.

== Roster ==
2019–20 Southeastern Louisiana Lions men's basketball team
Players
Coaches

Pos.	#	Name	Height	Weight	Year	Hometown
G	1	Jeremiah Saunders	6 ft 3 in (1.91 m)	200 lb (91 kg)	So	Fort Lauderdale, FL
G	2	Isiah Kirby	6 ft 3 in (1.91 m)	180 lb (82 kg)	Fr	Fort Lauderdale, FL
G	3	Maxim Romanov	6 ft 6 in (1.98 m)	200 lb (91 kg)	Fr	Nahariya, Israel
F	4	Maxwell Starwood	6 ft 9 in (2.06 m)	230 lb (104 kg)	Jr	Baton Rouge, LA
G	5	Byron Smith	6 ft 1 in (1.85 m)	170 lb (77 kg)	Fr	Palatka, FL
G	10	Von Julien	6 ft 1 in (1.85 m)	170 lb (77 kg)	Sr	Reserve, LA
F	11	McKay Howell	6 ft 7 in (2.01 m)	225 lb (102 kg)	Fr	Louisville, KY
G	12	Bryce Johnson	6 ft 6 in (1.98 m)	180 lb (82 kg)	Fr	Springfield, LA
F	13	Pape Diop	6 ft 9 in (2.06 m)	210 lb (95 kg)	So	Ziguinchor, Senegal
SF	20	Brandon Gonzalez	6 ft 6 in (1.98 m)	205 lb (93 kg)	Jr	Punta Gorda, FL
G/F	22	Nick Caldwell	6 ft 7 in (2.01 m)	205 lb (93 kg)	Fr	Geismar, LA
G	23	Avery Wilson	6 ft 4 in (1.93 m)	225 lb (102 kg)	So	Forest Park, GA
F	25	Ty Brewer	6 ft 7 in (2.01 m)	210 lb (95 kg)	So	Meridian, MS
C	33	Max Brackmann	7 ft 2 in (2.18 m)	275 lb (125 kg)	Fr	Löhne, Germany

Head coach

- David Kiefer (Kansas State)

Assistant coach(es)

- Mark Lieberman (FIU)
- Jordan Brooks (Hampton)
- Patrick Schulte (Kansas State)

Legend

- (C) Team captain
- (S) Suspended
- (I) Ineligible
- (W) Walk-on
- Injured
- Current redshirt

Roster
Last update: September 20, 2019

== Schedule and results ==
Date time, TV	Opponent	Result	Record	Site (attendance) city, state
Exhibition
October 26, 2019*; 1:00 pm	William Carey	W 75–49		University Center; Hammond, LA
Regular season
November 6, 2019*; 7:00 pm, ESPN3	at Tulane	L 55–76	0–1	Devlin Fieldhouse (2,179); New Orleans, LA
November 11, 2019*; 7:00 pm	Xavier (LA)	W 77–70	1–1	University Center (690); Hammond, LA
November 13, 2019*; 7:00 pm	Grambling State	L 70–81	1–2	University Center (814); Hammond, LA
November 17, 2019*; 1:00 pm	Mobile	W 65–58	2–2	University Center (440); Hammond, LA
November 20, 2019*; 7:00 pm	at Tulsa	L 66–73	2–3	Reynolds Center (3,036); Tulsa, OK
November 23, 2019*; 7:00 pm, ESPN+	at Austin Peay	L 60–81	2–4	Dunn Center (980); Clarksville, TN
November 25, 2019*; 7:00 pm, SECN+	at Vanderbilt	L 70–78	2–5	Memorial Gymnasium (8,589); Nashville, TN
December 3, 2019*; 7:00 pm, ESPN+	at Louisiana	L 81–98	2–6	Cajundome (3,509); Lafayette, LA
December 6, 2019*; 7:00 pm	Southern–New Orleans	W 79–74	3–6	University Center (556); Hammond, LA
December 18, 2019; 7:00 pm, ESPN+	at Lamar	L 73–79 ^{OT}	3–7 (0–1)	Montagne Center (1,412); Beaumont, TX
December 21, 2019*; 1:00 pm, SECN	vs. Ole Miss	L 76–83	3–8	Mississippi Coliseum (2,042); Jackson, MS
December 29, 2019*; 1:30 pm, ESPN+	at Oklahoma State	L 31–82	3–9	Gallagher-Iba Arena (7,722); Stillwater, OK
January 2, 2020; 1:00 pm	Stephen F. Austin	L 71–82	3–10 (0–2)	University Center (611); Hammond, LA
January 4, 2020; 3:30 pm	at Texas A&M–Corpus Christi	W 84–80	4–10 (1–2)	American Bank Center (1,107); Corpus Christi, TX
January 8, 2020; 6:30 pm	at Sam Houston State	L 62–67	4–11 (1–3)	Bernard Johnson Coliseum (646); Huntsville, TX
January 11, 2020; 4:00 pm	Nicholls	L 58–69	4–12 (1–4)	University Center (756); Hammond, LA
January 15, 2020; 7:00 pm	Texas A&M–Corpus Christi	W 62–56	5–12 (2–4)	University Center (570); Hammond, LA
January 18, 2020; 7:00 pm, ESPN+	at Abilene Christian	L 55–76	5–13 (2–5)	Moody Coliseum (1,683); Abilene, TX
January 22, 2020; 7:00 pm	McNeese State	L 61–77	5–14 (2–6)	University Center (772); Hammond, LA
January 25, 2020; 3:30 pm, ESPN3	at Northwestern State	W 84–81 ^{OT}	6–14 (3–6)	Prather Coliseum (1,303); Natchitoches, LA
January 29, 2020; 7:00 pm	at Central Arkansas	L 68–88	6–15 (3–7)	Farris Center (1,255); Conway, AR
February 1, 2020; 4:00 pm	New Orleans	L 73–84	6–16 (3–8)	University Center (729); Hammond, LA
February 5, 2020; 7:00 pm	Houston Baptist	L 76–79	6–17 (3–9)	University Center (858); Hammond, LA
February 8, 2020; 4:15 pm	at Incarnate Word	L 75–82 ^{OT}	6–18 (3–10)	McDermott Center (477); San Antonio, TX
February 12, 2020; 7:00 pm	Sam Houston State	L 70–79	6–19 (3–11)	University Center (620); Hammond, LA
February 15, 2020; 3:00 pm, ESPN3	at Nicholls	L 71–81	6–20 (3–12)	Stopher Gymnasium (566); Thibodaux, LA
February 22, 2020; 4:00 pm	Abilene Christian	L 69–75	6–21 (3–13)	University Center (816); Hammond, LA
February 26, 2020; 6:30 pm	at McNeese State	L 82–104	6–22 (3–14)	H&HP Complex (2,670); Lake Charles, LA
February 29, 2020; 4:00 pm	Northwestern State	W 95–92	7–22 (4–14)	University Center (603); Hammond, LA
March 4, 2020; 7:00 pm	Central Arkansas	W 69–65	8–22 (5–14)	University Center (554); Hammond, LA
March 7, 2020; 6:00 pm	at New Orleans	L 69–79	8–23 (5–15)	Lakefront Arena (1,129); New Orleans, LA
*Non-conference game. ^{#}Rankings from AP Poll. (#) Tournament seedings in parentheses. All times are in Central Time.

== See also ==
2019–20 Southeastern Louisiana Lady Lions basketball team
