= 2019–20 Nicholls Colonels men's basketball team =

American college basketball season

2019–20 Nicholls Colonels men's basketball
- Conference: Southland Conference
- Record: 21–10 (15–5 Southland)
- Head coach: Austin Claunch (2nd season)
- Associate head coach: Trevor Deloach
- Assistant coaches: Nick Bowman; Joey Brooks
- Home arena: Stopher Gymnasium

2019–20 Southland Conference men's basketball standings
	Conf.				Overall
Team	W		L	PCT	W		L	PCT
Stephen F. Austin	19	–	1	.950	28	–	3	.903
Abilene Christian	15	–	5	.750	20	–	11	.645
Nicholls	15	–	5	.750	21	–	10	.677
Sam Houston State	11	–	9	.550	18	–	13	.581
Northwestern State	11	–	9	.550	15	–	15	.500
Lamar	10	–	10	.500	17	–	15	.531
McNeese State	10	–	10	.500	15	–	17	.469
Texas A&M–CC	10	–	10	.500	14	–	18	.438
Central Arkansas	9	–	11	.450	10	–	21	.323
Incarnate Word	6	–	14	.300	9	–	22	.290
New Orleans	5	–	15	.250	9	–	21	.300
Southeastern Louisiana	5	–	15	.250	8	–	23	.258
Houston Baptist	4	–	16	.200	4	–	25	.138
Note: The 2020 SLC tournament was canceled after the first round due to the COVID-19 pandemic.

The 2019–20 Nicholls Colonels men's basketball team represented Nicholls State University in the 2019–20 NCAA Division I men's basketball season. The Colonels, led by second-year head coach Austin Claunch, played their home games at Stopher Gymnasium in Thibodaux, Louisiana as members of the Southland Conference. They finished the season 21–10, 15–5 in Southland play to finish in a tie for second place. They were set to take on Lamar in the second round of the Southland tournament until the tournament was cancelled amid the COVID-19 pandemic.

== Previous season ==
The Colonels finished the 2018–19 season 14–17 overall, 7–11 in Southland play to finish in 10th place. Since only the top eight teams are eligible for the Southland tournament, they failed to qualify.

== Roster ==
2019–20 Nicholls Colonels men's basketball team
Players
Coaches

Pos.	#	Name	Height	Weight	Year	Hometown
G	0	D'Angelo Hunter	6 ft 7 in (2.01 m)	200 lb (91 kg)	RS Sr	Louisville, Kentucky
F	1	Jaylen Fornes	6 ft 3 in (1.91 m)	210 lb (95 kg)	Sr	Pamlico County, North Carolina
G	3	Kevin Johnson	6 ft 0 in (1.83 m)	160 lb (73 kg)	Jr	Thibodaux, Louisiana
G	4	Tom Clement	6 ft 2 in (1.88 m)	175 lb (79 kg)	Sr	Thibodaux, Louisiana
G	11	Jeremiah Buford	6 ft 5 in (1.96 m)	185 lb (84 kg)	Jr	Atlanta, Georgia
G	13	Andre Jones	6 ft 4 in (1.93 m)	200 lb (91 kg)	RS Jr	Little Rock, Arkansas
G	14	Lorenzo McGhee	6 ft 5 in (1.96 m)	200 lb (91 kg)	So	Decatur, Georgia
G	15	Tyrease Terrell	6 ft 4 in (1.93 m)	165 lb (75 kg)	Fr	Slidell, Louisiana
G/F	21	Brandon Moore Jr.	6 ft 5 in (1.96 m)	210 lb (95 kg)	Sr	Dallas, Texas
G	22	Dexter McClanahan	6 ft 4 in (1.93 m)	185 lb (84 kg)	RS Sr	Ellenwood, Georgia
F	23	Elvis Harvey Jr.	6 ft 8 in (2.03 m)	220 lb (100 kg)	Sr	South Bay, Florida
F	24	Najee Garvin	6 ft 7 in (2.01 m)	210 lb (95 kg)	RS So	Lexington, South Carolina
F	25	Warith Alatishe	6 ft 7 in (2.01 m)	200 lb (91 kg)	So	Houston, Texas
G	33	Isaac Johnson	6 ft 3 in (1.91 m)	210 lb (95 kg)	RS So	Minneapolis, Minnesota
F/C	35	Ryghe Lyons	6 ft 10 in (2.08 m)	240 lb (109 kg)	Jr	Slidell, Louisiana
G		Lafayette Dorsey	6 ft 0 in (1.83 m)	200 lb (91 kg)	RS So	Los Angeles, California

Head coach

- Austin Claunch (Emory)

Assistant coach(es)

- Trevor Deloach (UNCW)
- Nick Bowman (Eastern Kentucky)
- Joey Brooks (Notre Dame)

Legend

- (C) Team captain
- (S) Suspended
- (I) Ineligible
- (W) Walk-on
- Injured
- Current redshirt

Roster
Last update: November 25, 2019

== Schedule and results ==
Date time, TV	Rank^{#}	Opponent^{#}	Result	Record	Site (attendance) city, state
Non-conference regular season
November 5, 2019*; 7:00 pm, BTN+		at Illinois	L 70–78 ^{OT}	0–1	State Farm Center (10,034); Champaign, IL
November 9, 2019*; 11:00 am, ACCNX		at Pittsburgh	W 75–70	1–1	Petersen Events Center (7,956); Pittsburgh, PA
November 13, 2019*; 7:00 pm		Paul Quinn	W 81–66	2–1	Stopher Gymnasium (721); Thibodaux, LA
November 16, 2019*; 3:00 pm, SECN+		at No. 23 LSU	L 65–75	2–2	Pete Maravich Assembly Center (8,833); Baton Rouge, LA
November 19, 2019*; 6:00 pm, ESPN+		at Rhode Island; Jamaica Classic campus game	L 65–70	2–3	Ryan Center (4,520); Kingston, RI
November 22, 2019*; 10:30 am, CBSSN		vs. North Carolina A&T; Jamaica Classic	L 54–66	2–4	Montego Bay Convention Centre; Montego Bay, Jamaica
November 24, 2019*; 8:00 pm, CBSSN		vs. UMBC; Jamaica Classic	W 82–72	3–4	Montego Bay Convention Centre; Montego Bay, Jamaica
November 26, 2019*; 7:00 pm		Blue Mountain College	W 102–56	4–4	Stopher Gymnasium (203); Thibodaux, LA
December 2, 2019*; 7:00 pm		Campbellsville Harrodsburg	W 120–69	5–4	Stopher Gymnasium (273); Thibodaux, LA
December 11, 2019*; 7:00 pm		Carver College	W 118–44	6–4	Stopher Gymnasium (283); Thibodaux, LA
December 14, 2019*; ATTSNPT		at West Virginia	L 57–83	6–5	WVU Coliseum (10,991); Morgantown, WV
Southland regular season
December 18, 2019; 7:00 pm		Texas A&M–Corpus Christi	W 64–58	7–5 (1–0)	Stopher Gymnasium (360); Thibodaux, LA
December 21, 2019; 7:00 pm, ESPN+		at Abilene Christian	L 61–79	7–6 (1–1)	Moody Coliseum (461); Abilene, TX
January 2, 2020; 7:00 pm		Incarnate Word	W 76–60	8–6 (2–1)	Stopher Gymnasium (327); Thibodaux, LA
January 5, 2020; 5:30 pm		at Sam Houston State	W 70–58	9–6 (3–1)	Bernard Johnson Coliseum (767); Huntsville, TX
January 8, 2020; 7:00 pm, ESPN3		at Lamar	W 61–52	10–6 (4–1)	Montagne Center (1,811); Beaumont, TX
January 11, 2020; 4:00 pm		at Southeastern Louisiana	W 69–58	11–6 (5–1)	University Center (756); Hammond, LA
January 15, 2020; 7:00 pm		Northwestern State	L 72–73	11–7 (5–2)	Stopher Gymnasium (577); Thibodaux, LA
January 18, 2020; 3:00 pm		Central Arkansas	W 79–72	12–7 (6–2)	Stopher Gymnasium (679); Thibodaux, LA
January 22, 2020; 7:00 pm		Houston Baptist	W 91–83	13–7 (7–2)	Stopher Gymnasium (1,137); Thibodaux, LA
January 25, 2020; 6:15 pm		at New Orleans	W 77–72	14–7 (8–2)	Lakefront Arena (1,294); New Orleans, LA
January 29, 2020; 6:30 pm		at McNeese State	L 74–80 ^{OT}	14–8 (8–3)	H&HP Complex (3,623); Lake Charles, LA
February 5, 2020; 6:30 pm, ESPN+		at Stephen F. Austin	L 64–70	14–9 (8–4)	William R. Johnson Coliseum (2,943); Nacogdoches, TX
February 8, 2020; 3:00 pm		Sam Houston State	W 88–82	15–9 (9–4)	Stopher Gymnasium (743); Thibodaux, LA
February 12, 2020; 7:00 pm		Lamar	W 69–65	16–9 (10–4)	Stopher Gymnasium (807); Thibodaux, LA
February 15, 2020; 3:00 pm		Southeastern Louisiana	W 81–71	17–9 (11–4)	Stopher Gymnasium (566); Thibodaux, LA
February 19, 2020; 6:30 pm		at Northwestern State	W 73–69	18–9 (12–4)	Prather Coliseum (1,200); Natchitoches, LA
February 22, 2020; 3:00 pm		at Central Arkansas	L 65–84	18–10 (12–5)	Farris Center (2,912); Conway, AR
February 26, 2020; 7:00 pm		at Houston Baptist	W 93–85	19–10 (13–5)	Sharp Gymnasium (595); Houston, TX
February 29, 2020; 3:00 pm		New Orleans	W 92–68	20–10 (14–5)	Stopher Gymnasium (737); Thibodaux, LA
March 4, 2020; 7:00 pm		McNeese State	W 80–56	21–10 (15–5)	Stopher Gymnasium (879); Thibodaux, LA
Southland tournament
March 12, 2020; 7:30 pm, ESPN+	(3)	vs. (6) Lamar; Second round	Cancelled due to the COVID-19 pandemic		Merrell Center; Katy, TX
*Non-conference game. ^{#}Rankings from AP Poll. (#) Tournament seedings in parentheses. All times are in Central.

== See also ==
- 2019–20 Nicholls Colonels women's basketball team
