= 2019–20 Stephen F. Austin Lumberjacks basketball team =

American college basketball season

2019–20 Stephen F. Austin Lumberjacks basketball

Southland regular season champions
- Conference: Southland Conference
- Record: 28–3 (19–1 Southland)
- Head coach: Kyle Keller (4th season)
- Assistant coaches: Jeremy Cox; Wade Mason; Mitch Vanya
- Home arena: William R. Johnson Coliseum (Capacity: 7,203)

2019–20 Southland Conference men's basketball standings
	Conf.				Overall
Team	W		L	PCT	W		L	PCT
Stephen F. Austin	19	–	1	.950	28	–	3	.903
Abilene Christian	15	–	5	.750	20	–	11	.645
Nicholls	15	–	5	.750	21	–	10	.677
Sam Houston State	11	–	9	.550	18	–	13	.581
Northwestern State	11	–	9	.550	15	–	15	.500
Lamar	10	–	10	.500	17	–	15	.531
McNeese State	10	–	10	.500	15	–	17	.469
Texas A&M–CC	10	–	10	.500	14	–	18	.438
Central Arkansas	9	–	11	.450	10	–	21	.323
Incarnate Word	6	–	14	.300	9	–	22	.290
New Orleans	5	–	15	.250	9	–	21	.300
Southeastern Louisiana	5	–	15	.250	8	–	23	.258
Houston Baptist	4	–	16	.200	4	–	25	.138
Note: The 2020 SLC tournament was canceled after the first round due to the COVID-19 pandemic.

The 2019–20 Stephen F. Austin Lumberjacks basketball team represented Stephen F. Austin State University during the 2019–20 NCAA Division I men's basketball season. The Lumberjacks were led by fourth-year head coach Kyle Keller and played their home games at the William R. Johnson Coliseum in Nacogdoches, Texas as members of the Southland Conference. They finished the season 28–3, 19–1 in Southland play to win the Southland regular season championship. As the No. 1 seed, they received a double-bye to the semifinals of the Southland tournament, however, the tournament was cancelled amid the COVID-19 pandemic. With the Southland tournament's cancellation, they were awarded the Southland's automatic bid to the NCAA tournament, however, the NCAA tournament was also cancelled due to the same outbreak.

During the season, they achieved a notable upset road win over Duke, then ranked #1 in the AP Poll, by the score of 85–83 in overtime. They became the first non-conference team to defeat Duke at Cameron Indoor Stadium since St. John's in the 1999–2000 season, breaking a streak of 150 consecutive Duke non-conference home wins.

== Previous season ==
The 2018–19 Stephen F. Austin Lumberjacks basketball team finished the season 14–16, 7–11 in Southland play to finish in ninth place.

== Offseason ==
=== Departures ===
Name	Number	Pos.	Height	Weight	Year	Hometown	Notes
Davonte Fitzgerald	4	F	6'7"	205	Graduate	Atlanta, GA	Final year of eligibility
Shannon Bogues	5	G	6'2"	185	Senior	Killeen, TX	Graduated
T. J. Holyfield	22	F	6'8"	220	Senior	Albuquerque, NM	Graduated
Jovan Grujić	32	C	7'0"	230	Senior	Pančevo, SER	Graduated

== Roster ==
2019–20 Stephen F. Austin Lumberjacks men's basketball team
Players
Coaches

Pos.	#	Name	Height	Weight	Year	Hometown
G	0	Sama’zha Hart	5 ft 11 in (1.8 m)	185 lb (84 kg)	Sr	Dallas, Texas
G/F	1	Kevon Harris	6 ft 6 in (1.98 m)	225 lb (102 kg)	Sr	Ellenwood, Georgia
G	2	Roti Ware	6 ft 3 in (1.91 m)	172 lb (78 kg)	Jr	Morton, Mississippi
F	3	Cameron Johnson	6 ft 4 in (1.93 m)	209 lb (95 kg)	Jr	Little Rock, Arkansas
G	4	David Kachelries	6 ft 1 in (1.85 m)	—	Jr	Emmaus, Pennsylvania
G	10	John Comeaux	5 ft 11 in (1.8 m)	185 lb (84 kg)	Sr	Beaumont, Texas
G	11	Oddyste Walker	6 ft 2 in (1.88 m)	178 lb (81 kg)	So	Baton Rouge, Louisiana
F	12	Charlie Daniels	6 ft 9 in (2.06 m)	—	Jr	Jacksonville, Florida
F	13	Calvin Solomon	6 ft 7 in (2.01 m)	—	Fr	Houston, Texas
F	14	Gavin Kensmil	6 ft 7 in (2.01 m)	—	Jr	Paramaribo, Suriname
G	15	Kharee McDaniel	5 ft 10 in (1.78 m)	—	Fr	Houston, Texas
F	20	Landon Badgley	6 ft 9 in (2.06 m)	—	Fr	Houston, Texas
F	23	Nathan Bain	6 ft 6 in (1.98 m)	200 lb (91 kg)	Sr	Freeport, Bahamas
G	24	Tyler Zivney	6 ft 2 in (1.88 m)	—	So	Rockwall, Texas
G	25	Gabe Matturro	6 ft 0 in (1.83 m)	—	Fr	Katy, Texas
F	35	Demiere Brown	6 ft 6 in (1.98 m)	—	Jr	Powder Springs, Georgia

Head coach

- Kyle Keller (Louisiana Tech)

Assistant coach(es)

- Jeremy Cox (Colorado Mesa)
- Desmond Haymon (Stephen F. Austin)
- Mitch Vanya (Texas A&M)

Legend

- (C) Team captain
- (S) Suspended
- (I) Ineligible
- (W) Walk-on
- Injured
- Current redshirt

Roster
Last update: February 20, 2020

== Schedule ==
Date time, TV	Rank^{#}	Opponent^{#}	Result	Record	High points	High rebounds	High assists	Site (attendance) city, state
Regular season
November 6, 2019*; 6:30 pm, ESPN+		LeTourneau	W 89–70	1–0	18 – Harris	10 – Kensmil	2 – West	William R. Johnson Coliseum (2,588); Nacogdoches, TX
November 9, 2019*; 1:30 pm, ESPN3		North Carolina Central	W 94–64	2–0	32 – Harris	7 – Harris	5 – Comeaux	William R. Johnson Coliseum (3,167); Nacogdoches, TX
November 13, 2019*; 6:30 pm, ESPN+		Niagara	W 89–80	3–0	19 – Johnson	10 – Solomon	3 – Johnson	William R. Johnson Coliseum (2,441); Nacogdoches, TX
November 16, 2019*; 5:30 pm, ESPN3		Drexel	W 82–67	4–0	18 – Harris	10 – Solomon	7 – Comeaux	William R. Johnson Coliseum (2,365); Nacogdoches, TX
November 20, 2019*; 6:00 pm, BTN Plus		at Rutgers	L 57–69	4–1	18 – Harris	10 – Kensmil	2 – Walker	Louis Brown Athletic Center (4,536); Piscataway, NJ
November 26, 2019*; 8:00 pm, ACCNX		at No. 1 Duke	W 85–83 ^{OT}	5–1	26 – Harris	7 – Kensmil	4 – Harris	Cameron Indoor Stadium (9,314); Durham, NC
November 30, 2019*; 4:00 pm		at Arkansas State	W 76–57	6–1	22 – Harris	15 – Kensmil	3 – Kachelries	First National Bank Arena (1,606); Jonesboro, AR
December 2, 2019*; 6:30 pm, ESPN3		Arlington Baptist	W 114–49	7–1	22 – Johnson	10 – Kensmil	7 – Kachelries	William R. Johnson Coliseum (3,228); Nacogdoches, TX
December 6, 2019*; 7:00 pm, SECN+		at Alabama	L 68–78	7–2	18 – Johnson	7 – Harris	2 – Comeaux	Coleman Coliseum (9,545); Tuscaloosa, AL
December 14, 2019*; 8:00 pm, ESPN+		Louisiana–Monroe	W 66–59	8–2	17 – Harris	8 – Harris	7 – Harris	William R. Johnson Coliseum (2,143); Nacogdoches, TX
December 18, 2019; 6:30 pm, ESPN3		Houston Baptist	W 96–68	9–2 (1–0)	18 – Harris	7 – Tied, 2	4 – Comeaux	William R. Johnson Coliseum (2,357); Nacogdoches, TX
December 21, 2019; 3:00 pm		at McNeese State	W 81–73	10–2 (2–0)	21 – Kensmil	11 – Kensmil	5 – Kachelries	H&HP Complex (3,565); Lake Charles, LA
December 28, 2019*; 2:00 pm, ESPN+		Paul Quinn	W 94–62	11–2	16 – Kachelries	7 – Solomon	4 – Tied, 2	William R. Johnson Coliseum (2,182); Nacogdoches, TX
January 2, 2020; 1:00 pm		at Southeastern Louisiana	W 82–71	12–2 (3–0)	21 – Harris	11 – Harris	3 – Tied, 2	University Center (611); Hammond, LA
January 4, 2020; 6:00 pm		at New Orleans	W 87–68	13–2 (4–0)	21 – Harris	6 – Harris	3 – Harris	Lakefront Arena (743); New Orleans, LA
January 8, 2020; 6:30 pm, ESPN3		Texas A&M–Corpus Christi	L 72–73	13–3 (4–1)	24 – Harris	6 – Harris	4 – Kensmil	William R. Johnson Coliseum (822); Nacogdoches, TX
January 15, 2020; 7:00 pm		at Central Arkansas	W 77–76	14–3 (5–1)	19 – Harris	10 – Harris	4 – Harris	Farris Center (1,455); Conway, AR
January 18, 2020; 4:30 pm, ESPN+		Incarnate Word	W 80–56	15–3 (6–1)	19 – Johnson	9 – Kensmil	5 – Ware	William R. Johnson Coliseum (4,147); Nacogdoches, TX
January 22, 2020; 6:30 pm		at Northwestern State	W 69–62	16–3 (7–1)	25 – Harris	8 – Harris	4 – Ware	Prather Coliseum (1,524); Natchitoches, LA
January 25, 2020; 4:30 pm, ESPN+		at Lamar	W 70–62	17–3 (8–1)	18 – Comeaux	11 – Solomon	6 – Harris	Montagne Center (4,254); Beaumont, TX
January 29, 2020; 7:30 pm, ESPN+		Abilene Christian	W 71–61	18–3 (9–1)	19 – Harris	7 – Johnson	4 – Ware	William R. Johnson Coliseum (4,341); Nacogdoches, TX
February 1, 2020; 5:30 pm, ESPN3		at Sam Houston State	W 81–76	19–3 (10–1)	17 – Kensmil	6 – Kensmil	4 – Bain	Bernard Johnson Coliseum (2,889); Huntsville, TX
February 5, 2020; 6:30 pm, ESPN+		Nicholls	W 70–64	20–3 (11–1)	17 – Bain	9 – Bain	3 – Bain	William R. Johnson Coliseum (2,943); Nacogdoches, TX
February 8, 2020; 4:30 pm, ESPN+		New Orleans	W 81–74	21–3 (12–1)	23 – Harris	7 – Kensmil	7 – Bain	William R. Johnson Coliseum (5,337); Nacogdoches, TX
February 12, 2020; 7:00 pm		at Texas A&M–Corpus Christi	W 75–67	22–3 (13–1)	23 – Kensmil	8 – Bain	5 – Ware	American Bank Center (1,537); Corpus Christi, TX
February 19, 2020; 6:30 pm, ESPN+		Central Arkansas	W 83–68	23–3 (14–1)	14 – Kensmil	6 – Kensmil	3 – Kensmil	William R. Johnson Coliseum (2,780); Nacogdoches, TX
February 22, 2020; 4:15 pm		at Incarnate Word	W 80–56	24–3 (15–1)	16 – Johnson	7 – Harris	5 – Bain	McDermott Center (691); San Antonio, TX
February 26, 2020; 6:30 pm, ESPN+		Northwestern State	W 90–59	25–3 (16–1)	18 – Harris	9 – Harris	5 – Johnson	William R. Johnson Coliseum (3,126); Nacogdoches, TX
February 29, 2020; 4:30 pm, ESPN3		Lamar	W 95–76	26–3 (17–1)	20 – Harris	9 – Kensmil	5 – Harris	William R. Johnson Coliseum (4,184); Nacogdoches, TX
March 3, 2020; 7:30 pm, ESPN+		at Abilene Christian	W 77–72	27–3 (18–1)	23 – Harris	9 – Solomon	2 – Tied	Moody Coliseum (2,893); Abilene, TX
March 7, 2020; 4:30 pm, ESPN+		Sam Houston State	W 68–57	28–3 (19–1)	17 – Kensmil	10 – Kensmil	2 – Ware	William R. Johnson Coliseum (4,631); Nacogdoches, TX
Southland Conference tournament
March 13, 2020; 5:00 pm, ESPN+	(1)	vs. Semifinals	Cancelled due to the COVID-19 pandemic					Merrell Center; Katy, TX
*Non-conference game. ^{#}Rankings from AP Poll. (#) Tournament seedings in parentheses. All times are in Central Time.

== Rankings ==
Ranking movements Legend: RV = Received votes
	Week																				
Poll	Pre	1	2	3	4	5	6	7	8	9	10	11	12	13	14	15	16	17	18	19	Final
AP																			RV		Not released
Coaches	RV																				

*AP does not release post-NCAA Tournament rankings

== See also ==
2019–20 Stephen F. Austin Ladyjacks basketball team
