= David Kiefer =

American basketball coach (born 1984)

Current position
- Title: Head coach
- Team: Southeastern Louisiana
- Conference: Southland
- Record: 95–123 (.436)

Biographical details
- Born: September 16, 1984 (age 42); St. Petersburg, Florida, U.S.
- Education: Kansas State ('07); Salem International ('13)

Coaching career (HC unless noted)
- 2005–2006: Cincinnati (student manager)
- 2006–2008: Kansas State (student manager)
- 2008–2010: St. Mary's Ryken HS (assistant)
- 2011–2012: Arlington Country Day School (assistant)
- 2012–2013: Jones County JC (assistant)
- 2013–2014: Northwest Florida State (assistant)
- 2015–2019: Southeastern Louisiana (assistant/assoc. HC)
- 2019–present: Southeastern Louisiana

Administrative career (AD unless noted)
- 2010–2011: UCF (video assistant)
- 2014–2015: South Carolina (video coordinator)

Head coaching record
- Overall: 95–123 (.436)
- Tournaments: 0–1 (TBC)

Accomplishments and honors

Awards
- Southland Coach of the Year (2022)

David Kiefer (born September 16, 1984) is the current head coach of the Southeastern Louisiana Lions basketball team.

== Head coaching record ==
Record table
Season	Team	Overall	Conference	Standing	Postseason
Southeastern Louisiana Lions (Southland Conference) (2019–present)
2019–20	Southeastern Louisiana	8–23	5–15	T–11th	
2020–21	Southeastern Louisiana	8–18	5–10	9th	
2021–22	Southeastern Louisiana	19–15	10–4	T–2nd	TBC First Round
2022–23	Southeastern Louisiana	18–14	12–6	3rd	
2023–24	Southeastern Louisiana	15–17	10–8	5th	
2024–25	Southeastern Louisiana	18–14	12–8	T-4th	
2025–26	Southeastern Louisiana	9–22	6–16	12th	
2026–27	Southeastern Louisiana	0–0	0–0		
Southeastern Louisiana:		95–123 (.436)	60–67 (.472)		
Total:		95–123 (.436)			
National champion Postseason invitational champion Conference regular season champion Conference regular season and conference tournament champion Division regular season champion Division regular season and conference tournament champion Conference tournament champion
