= 2019–20 Northwestern State Demons basketball team =

American college basketball season

2019–20 Northwestern State Demons basketball
- Conference: Southland Conference
- Record: 15–15 (11–9 Southland)
- Head coach: Mike McConathy (21st season)
- Assistant coaches: Jeff Moore; Dave Simmons; Jacob Spielbauer
- Home arena: Prather Coliseum

2019–20 Southland Conference men's basketball standings
| | Conf. | | | | Overall |
| Team | W | | L | PCT | W | | L | PCT |
|---|---|---|---|---|---|---|---|---|
| Stephen F. Austin | 19 | – | 1 | .950 | 28 | – | 3 | .903 |
| Abilene Christian | 15 | – | 5 | .750 | 20 | – | 11 | .645 |
| Nicholls | 15 | – | 5 | .750 | 21 | – | 10 | .677 |
| Sam Houston State | 11 | – | 9 | .550 | 18 | – | 13 | .581 |
| Northwestern State | 11 | – | 9 | .550 | 15 | – | 15 | .500 |
| Lamar | 10 | – | 10 | .500 | 17 | – | 15 | .531 |
| McNeese State | 10 | – | 10 | .500 | 15 | – | 17 | .469 |
| Texas A&M–CC | 10 | – | 10 | .500 | 14 | – | 18 | .438 |
| Central Arkansas | 9 | – | 11 | .450 | 10 | – | 21 | .323 |
| Incarnate Word | 6 | – | 14 | .300 | 9 | – | 22 | .290 |
| New Orleans | 5 | – | 15 | .250 | 9 | – | 21 | .300 |
| Southeastern Louisiana | 5 | – | 15 | .250 | 8 | – | 23 | .258 |
| Houston Baptist | 4 | – | 16 | .200 | 4 | – | 25 | .138 |
Note: The 2020 SLC tournament was canceled after the first round due to the COVID-19 pandemic.

The 2019–20 Northwestern State Demons basketball team represented Northwestern State University in the 2019–20 NCAA Division I men's basketball season. The Demons, led by 21st-year head coach Mike McConathy, played their home games at Prather Coliseum in Natchitoches, Louisiana as members of the Southland Conference. They finished the season 15–15, 11–9 in Southland play to finish in a tie for fourth place. They defeated Texas A&M–Corpus Christi in the first round of the Southland tournament and were set to take on Sam Houston State in the second round until the tournament was cancelled amid the COVID-19 pandemic.

== Previous season ==
The Demons finished the 2018–19 season 11–20 overall, 6–12 in Southland play to finish in 11th place. Since only the top eight teams are eligible for the Southland tournament, they failed to qualify.

== Roster ==
2019–20 Northwestern State Demons men's basketball team
Players
Coaches

| Pos. | # | Name | Height | Weight | Year | Hometown |
|---|---|---|---|---|---|---|
| G | 0 | C.J. Jones | 5 ft 10 in (1.78 m) | 160 lb (73 kg) | Jr | Monroe, Louisiana |
| G | 1 | LaTerrance Reed | 6 ft 2 in (1.88 m) | 193 lb (88 kg) | Sr | Buffalo, New York |
| G | 2 | John Norvel | 6 ft 2 in (1.88 m) | 170 lb (77 kg) | Jr | Slidell, Louisiana |
| G | 3 | Brian White | 5 ft 6 in (1.68 m) | 164 lb (74 kg) | So | Natchitoches, Louisiana |
| F | 4 | Chudier Bile | 6 ft 6 in (1.98 m) | 195 lb (88 kg) | RS Jr | Denver, Colorado |
| G | 10 | Jairus Roberson | 6 ft 2 in (1.88 m) | 175 lb (79 kg) | Jr | Dallas, Texas |
| F | 11 | Jamaure Gregg | 6 ft 7 in (2.01 m) | 225 lb (102 kg) | Jr | Oahu, Hawaii |
| G | 13 | Gatdoar Kueth | 6 ft 6 in (1.98 m) | 195 lb (88 kg) | Jr | Des Moines, Iowa |
| G | 14 | Jacob Guest | 6 ft 4 in (1.93 m) | 210 lb (95 kg) | Sr | Bossier City, Louisiana |
| G | 15 | Jovan Zelenbaba | 6 ft 4 in (1.93 m) | 180 lb (82 kg) | Fr | Kfar Blum, Israel |
| G | 30 | Trenton Massner | 6 ft 2 in (1.88 m) | 163 lb (74 kg) | So | Wapello, Iowa |
| C | 32 | Larry Owens | 6 ft 7 in (2.01 m) | 300 lb (136 kg) | Jr | Monroe, Louisiana |
| G | 33 | Nikos Chougkaz | 6 ft 9 in (2.06 m) | 200 lb (91 kg) | Fr | Athens, Greece |
| F | 34 | Robert Chougkaz | 6 ft 9 in (2.06 m) | 195 lb (88 kg) | Fr | Athens, Greece |
| F | 35 | Dalin Williams | 6 ft 9 in (2.06 m) | 215 lb (98 kg) | So | Stinnett, Texas |

Head coach

- Mike McConathy (Louisiana Tech)

Assistant coach(es)

- Jeff Moore (Missouri Valley)
- Dave Simmons (Louisiana Tech)
- Jacob Spielbauer (William Penn)

Legend

- (C) Team captain
- (S) Suspended
- (I) Ineligible
- (W) Walk-on
- Injured
- Current redshirt

Roster
Last update: November 24, 2019

== Schedule and results ==
| Date time, TV | Rank^{#} | Opponent^{#} | Result | Record | Site (attendance) city, state |
Regular season
| November 5, 2019*; 5:30 pm, Demon TV | | Centenary | W 84–57 | 1–0 | Prather Coliseum (1,245); Natchitoches, LA |
| November 6, 2019*; 7:00 pm, SECN+ | | at Texas A&M | L 63–77 | 1–1 | Reed Arena (5,751); College Station, TX |
| November 12, 2019*; 6:30 pm | | Rice | L 74–80 | 1–2 | Prather Coliseum (1,606); Natchitoches, LA |
| November 16, 2019*; 1:00 pm, ESPN3 | | at Tulane | L 52–79 | 1–3 | Devlin Fieldhouse (919); New Orleans, LA |
| November 19, 2019*; 6:30 pm | | Louisiana College | W 67–60 | 2–3 | Prather Coliseum (1,335); Natchitoches, LA |
| November 26, 2019*; 7:00 pm | | at Louisiana–Monroe | L 69–77 | 2–4 | Fant–Ewing Coliseum (1,515); Monroe, LA |
| December 3, 2019*; 7:00 pm, ESPN3 | | at SMU | L 51–77 | 2–5 | Moody Coliseum (3,641); University Park, TX |
| December 8, 2019*; 3:00 pm, SECN | | at LSU | L 59–109 | 2–6 | Pete Maravich Assembly Center (9,483); Baton Rouge, LA |
| December 18, 2019; 6:30 pm | | at Sam Houston State | L 79–92 | 2–7 (0–1) | Bernard Johnson Coliseum (650); Huntsville, TX |
| December 21, 2019; 3:00 pm | | Lamar | W 67–61 | 3–7 (1–1) | Prather Coliseum (951); Natchitoches, LA |
| December 29, 2019*; 4:00 pm | | Champion Christian | W 101–61 | 4–7 | Prather Coliseum (765); Natchitoches, LA |
| January 2, 2020; 7:00 pm | | at Texas A&M–Corpus Christi | L 62–67 | 4–8 (1–2) | American Bank Center (1,237); Corpus Christi, TX |
| January 5, 2020; 4:00 pm | | Houston Baptist | W 106–79 | 5–8 (2–2) | Prather Coliseum (767); Natchitoches, LA |
| January 8, 2020; 7:00 pm | | at Incarnate Word | W 72–66 | 6–8 (3–2) | McDermott Center (124); San Antonio, TX |
| January 11, 2020; 3:30 pm | | at McNeese State | L 76–85 | 6–9 (3–3) | H&HP Complex (3,016); Lake Charles, LA |
| January 15, 2020; 7:00 pm | | at Nicholls | W 73–72 | 7–9 (4–3) | Stopher Gymnasium (577); Thibodaux, LA |
| January 22, 2020; 6:30 pm | | Stephen F. Austin | L 62–69 | 7–10 (4–4) | Prather Coliseum (1,524); Natchitoches, LA |
| January 25, 2020; 3:00 pm | | Southeastern Louisiana | L 81–84 ^{OT} | 7–11 (4–5) | Prather Coliseum (1,306); Natchitoches, LA |
| January 29, 2020; 7:00 pm | | at New Orleans | W 82–74 | 8–11 (5–5) | Lakefront Arena (629); New Orleans, LA |
| February 1, 2020; 3:00 pm | | Central Arkansas | L 71–79 | 8–12 (5–6) | Prather Coliseum (1,104); Natchitoches, LA |
| February 5, 2020; 6:30 pm | | Abilene Christian | W 73–69 | 9–12 (6–6) | Prather Coliseum (1,001); Natchitoches, LA |
| February 8, 2020; 7:00 pm | | at Houston Baptist | W 93–79 | 10–12 (7–6) | Sharp Gymnasium (889); Houston, TX |
| February 12, 2020; 6:30 pm | | Incarnate Word | W 70–60 | 11–2 (8–6) | Prather Coliseum (802); Natchitoches, LA |
| February 15, 2020; 3:00 pm | | McNeese State | W 84–79 | 12–12 (9–6) | Prather Coliseum (907); Natchitoches, LA |
| February 19, 2020; 6:30 pm | | Nicholls | L 69–73 | 12–13 (9–7) | Prather Coliseum (1,200); Natchitoches, LA |
| February 26, 2020; 6:30 pm | | at Stephen F. Austin | L 59–90 | 12–14 (9–8) | William R. Johnson Coliseum (3,126); Nacogdoches, TX |
| February 29, 2020; 4:00 pm | | at Southeastern Louisiana | L 92–95 | 12–15 (9–9) | University Center (603); Hammond, LA |
| March 4, 2020; 6:30 pm | | New Orleans | W 95–73 | 13–15 (10–9) | Prather Coliseum (1,212); Natchitoches, LA |
| March 7, 2020; 3:00 pm | | at Central Arkansas | W 100–85 | 14–15 (11–9) | Farris Center (1,245); Conway, AR |
Southland tournament
| March 11, 2020; 5:00 pm, ESPN+ | (5) | vs. (8) Texas A&M–Corpus Christi; First round | W 79–62 | 15–15 | Merrell Center; Katy, TX |
| March 12, 2020; 5:00 pm, ESPN+ | (5) | vs. (4) Sam Houston State; Second round | Cancelled due to the COVID-19 pandemic | | Merrell Center; Katy, TX |
*Non-conference game. ^{#}Rankings from AP Poll. (#) Tournament seedings in parentheses. All times are in Central.

== See also ==
2019–20 Northwestern State Lady Demons basketball team
