= 2019–20 Central Arkansas Bears basketball team =

American college basketball season

2019–20 Central Arkansas Bears basketball
- Conference: Southland Conference
- Record: 10–21 (9–11 Southland)
- Head coach: Russ Pennell (6th season, resigned 1/7/20); Anthony Boone (interim)
- Assistant coaches: Matt Scherbenske; Tyler Miller; Brock Widders
- Home arena: Farris Center (Capacity: 6,000)

2019–20 Southland Conference men's basketball standings
	Conf.				Overall
Team	W		L	PCT	W		L	PCT
Stephen F. Austin	19	–	1	.950	28	–	3	.903
Abilene Christian	15	–	5	.750	20	–	11	.645
Nicholls	15	–	5	.750	21	–	10	.677
Sam Houston State	11	–	9	.550	18	–	13	.581
Northwestern State	11	–	9	.550	15	–	15	.500
Lamar	10	–	10	.500	17	–	15	.531
McNeese State	10	–	10	.500	15	–	17	.469
Texas A&M–CC	10	–	10	.500	14	–	18	.438
Central Arkansas	9	–	11	.450	10	–	21	.323
Incarnate Word	6	–	14	.300	9	–	22	.290
New Orleans	5	–	15	.250	9	–	21	.300
Southeastern Louisiana	5	–	15	.250	8	–	23	.258
Houston Baptist	4	–	16	.200	4	–	25	.138
Note: The 2020 SLC tournament was canceled after the first round due to the COVID-19 pandemic.

The 2019–20 Central Arkansas Bears basketball team represented the University of Central Arkansas in the 2019–20 NCAA Division I men's basketball season. The Bears were led by interim head coach Anthony Boone, who took over for then sixth-year head coach Russ Pennell following Pennell's resignation on January 7, and played their home games at the Farris Center in Conway, Arkansas as members of the Southland Conference. They finished the season 10–21, 9–11 in Southland play to finish in ninth place. They failed to qualify for the Southland Conference tournament.

== Previous season ==
The Bears finished the 2018–19 season 14–19 overall, 8–10 in Southland play, to finish in a tie for seventh place. In the Southland tournament, they defeated Texas A&M–Corpus Christi in the first round, before being defeated by Southeastern Louisiana in the second round.

== Roster ==
2019–20 Central Arkansas Bears men's basketball team
Players
Coaches

Pos.	#	Name	Height	Weight	Year	Hometown
PF	0	SK Shittu	6 ft 9 in (2.06 m)	215 lb (98 kg)	So	Rogers, Arkansas
G	1	Rylan Bergersen	6 ft 6 in (1.98 m)	205 lb (93 kg)	Jr	Boise, Idaho
G	2	Lewis McDaniel	6 ft 3 in (1.91 m)	180 lb (82 kg)	Fr	Nashville, Tennessee
F	3	Aaron Weidenaar	6 ft 7 in (2.01 m)	205 lb (93 kg)	Sr	Bozeman, Montana
G	4	Khaleem Bennett	6 ft 4 in (1.93 m)	200 lb (91 kg)	So	Hamilton, Ontario
G	5	Masai Olowokere	6 ft 5 in (1.96 m)	190 lb (86 kg)	Fr	Brooklyn, New York
G/F	13	Eddy Kayouloud	6 ft 7 in (2.01 m)	220 lb (100 kg)	So	Paris, France
G	14	Collin Cooper	6 ft 2 in (1.88 m)	185 lb (84 kg)	Fr	Fayetteville, Arkansas
C	15	Hayden Koval	7 ft 0 in (2.13 m)	220 lb (100 kg)	Jr	Prosper, Texas
C	21	Jonas Munson	7 ft 0 in (2.13 m)	220 lb (100 kg)	Fr	Alexandria, Virginia
F	24	Jared Chatham	6 ft 8 in (2.03 m)	185 lb (84 kg)	Jr	Los Angeles, California
G/F	34	Jaxson Baker	6 ft 7 in (2.01 m)	200 lb (91 kg)	RS Fr	Phoenix, Arizona
C	35	Brandon Vanover	7 ft 0 in (2.13 m)	250 lb (113 kg)	Jr	Little Rock, Arkansas
PG	55	DeAndre Jones	5 ft 11 in (1.8 m)	160 lb (73 kg)	Jr	Boise, Idaho

Head coach

- Anthony Boone (Mississippi)

Assistant coach(es)

- Matt Scherbenske (Kentucky)
- Tyler Miller (Montana Western)
- Brock Widders (Lyon)

Legend

- (C) Team captain
- (S) Suspended
- (I) Ineligible
- (W) Walk-on
- Injured
- Current redshirt

Roster
Last update: November 26, 2019

== Schedule and results ==
Date time, TV	Opponent	Result	Record	Site (attendance) city, state
Exhibition
October 27, 2019*; 4:30 pm	vs. Oral Roberts; Hoops for Disaster Relief	W 92–84		Stubblefield Center; Fort Smith, AR
October 30, 2019*; 7:00 pm	University of the Ozarks	W 96–63		Farris Center; Conway, AR
Regular season
November 5, 2019*; 11:00 am, ESPN+	at No. 16 Baylor	L 61–105	0–1	Ferrell Center (8,805); Waco, TX
November 7, 2019*; 7:00 pm	Hendrix College	W 71–51	1–1	Farris Center (1,207); Conway, AR
November 9, 2019*; 11:00 am, FSSW	at Georgetown	L 78–89	1–2	Capital One Arena (5,785); Washington, D.C.
November 12, 2019*; 6:00 pm, ACCN	at No. 2 Duke	L 54–105	1–3	Cameron Indoor Stadium (9,314); Durham, NC
November 17, 2019*; 2:00 pm	Little Rock; Governor's I-40 Showdown	L 56–76	1–4	Farris Center (1,709); Conway, AR
November 22, 2019*; 9:00 pm	at California Baptist; 2K Empire Classic	L 98–104 ^{OT}	1–5	CBU Events Center (2,628); Riverside, CA
November 23, 2019*; 6:30 pm, ESPN3	vs. Prairie View A&M; 2K Empire Classic	L 72–78 ^{OT}	1–6	CBU Events Center (492); Riverside, CA
December 5, 2019*; 7:00 pm	at Wichita State	L 69–95	1–7	Charles Koch Arena (10,018); Wichita, KS
December 7, 2019*; 4:00 pm, P12N	at Utah	L 67–98	1–8	Jon M. Huntsman Center (9,888); Salt Lake City, UT
December 14, 2019*; 7:00 pm	at Pepperdine	L 79–92	1–9	Firestone Fieldhouse (835); Malibu, CA
December 18, 2019; 12:30 pm	Incarnate Word	W 88–82	2–9 (1–0)	Farris Center (426); Conway, AR
December 21, 2019; 1:00 pm	Texas A&M–Corpus Christi	W 71–67	3–9 (2–0)	Farris Center (207); Conway, AR
December 28, 2019*; 1:00 pm, FS1	at Marquette	L 54–106	3–10	Fiserv Forum (16,242); Milwaukee, WI
January 2, 2020; 7:00 pm	at Houston Baptist	L 107–111 ^{OT}	3–11 (2–1)	Sharp Gymnasium (529); Houston, TX
January 4, 2020; 3:00 pm	McNeese State	W 79–69	4–11 (3–1)	Farris Center (678); Conway, AR
January 8, 2020; 7:00 pm	at New Orleans	L 78–86	4–12 (3–2)	Lakefront Arena (427); New Orleans, LA
January 11, 2020; 3:00 pm	Sam Houston State	W 89–82	5–12 (4–2)	Farris Center (879); Conway, AR
January 15, 2020; 7:00 pm	Stephen F. Austin	L 76–77	5–13 (4–3)	Farris Center (1,455); Conway, AR
January 18, 2020; 3:00 pm	at Nicholls	L 72–79	5–14 (4–4)	Stopher Gymnasium (679); Thibodaux, LA
January 25, 2020; 3:00 pm	Abilene Christian	L 69–70 ^{OT}	5–15 (4–5)	Farris Center (1,486); Conway, AR
January 29, 2020; 7:00 pm	Southeastern Louisiana	W 88–68	6–15 (5–5)	Farris Center (1,255); Conway, AR
February 1, 2020; 3:00 pm	at Northwestern State	W 79–71	7–15 (6–5)	Prather Coliseum (1,104); Natchitoches, LA
February 5, 2020; 7:00 pm	at Lamar	L 67–74	7–16 (6–6)	Montagne Center (1,944); Beaumont, TX
February 8, 2020; 3:00 pm	at McNeese State	W 82–76 ^{OT}	8–16 (7–6)	H&HP Complex (3,789); Lake Charles, LA
February 12, 2020; 7:00 pm	New Orleans	W 73–68	9–16 (8–6)	Farris Center (1,485); Conway, AR
February 15, 2020; 3:30 pm	at Sam Houston State	L 67–82	9–17 (8–7)	Bernard Johnson Coliseum (775); Huntsville, TX
February 19, 2020; 6:30 pm	at Stephen F. Austin	L 68–83	9–18 (8–8)	William R. Johnson Coliseum (2,780); Nacogdoches, TX
February 22, 2020; 3:00 pm	Nicholls	W 84–65	10–18 (9–8)	Farris Center (2,912); Conway, AR
February 29, 2020; 3:30 pm	at Abilene Christian	L 70–75	10–19 (9–9)	Moody Coliseum (1,433); Abilene, TX
March 4, 2020; 7:00 pm	at Southeastern Louisiana	L 65–69	10–20 (9–10)	University Center (554); Hammond, LA
March 7, 2020; 3:00 pm	Northwestern State	L 85–100	10–21 (9–11)	Farris Center (1,245); Conway, AR
*Non-conference game. ^{#}Rankings from AP Poll. (#) Tournament seedings in parentheses. All times are in Central.

== See also ==
2019–20 Central Arkansas Sugar Bears basketball team
