= 2019–20 SMU Mustangs men's basketball team =

American college basketball season

2019–20 SMU Mustangs men's basketball
- Conference: American Athletic Conference
- Record: 19–11 (9–9 AAC)
- Head coach: Tim Jankovich (4th season)
- Assistant coaches: K. T. Turner; Shawn Forrest; Yaphett King
- Home arena: Moody Coliseum

2019–20 American Athletic Conference men's basketball standings
	Conf.				Overall
Team	W		L	PCT	W		L	PCT
Cincinnati	13	–	5	.722	20	–	10	.667
No. 22 Houston	13	–	5	.722	23	–	8	.742
Tulsa	13	–	5	.722	21	–	10	.677
Wichita State	11	–	7	.611	23	–	8	.742
UConn	10	–	8	.556	19	–	12	.613
Memphis	10	–	8	.556	21	–	10	.677
SMU	9	–	9	.500	19	–	11	.633
UCF	7	–	11	.389	16	–	14	.533
South Florida	7	–	11	.389	14	–	17	.452
Temple	6	–	12	.333	14	–	17	.452
East Carolina	5	–	13	.278	11	–	20	.355
Tulane	4	–	14	.222	12	–	18	.400
Note: The 2020 AAC tournament was canceled due to the COVID-19 pandemic. Rankings from AP poll

The 2019–20 SMU Mustangs men's basketball team represented Southern Methodist University during the 2019–20 NCAA Division I men's basketball season. The Mustangs were led by fourth-year head coach Tim Jankovich and played their home games at Moody Coliseum on their campus in University Park, Texas as members of the American Athletic Conference.

== Previous season ==
The Mustangs finished the 2018–19 season 15–17, 6–12 in AAC play and tied for the ninth place. In the AAC tournament, the team defeated Tulsa before losing to Cincinnati in the quarterfinals.

== Offseason ==
=== Departures ===
Name	Number	Pos.	Height	Weight	Year	Hometown	Reason for departure
Jahmal McMurray	0	G	6'0"	175	Senior	Topeka, KS	Graduated
Nat Dixon	5	G	6'4"	180	Graduate Student	Panama City, FL	Graduated
Jarrey Foster	10	G	6'6"	220	Senior	Houston, TX	Graduated
James Pyle	12	G	6'3"	175	Junior	Overland Park, KS	Walk-on; not on team roster
Luke Wilfong	22	G	6'1"	170	Sophomore	Memphis, TN	Walk-on; not on team roster
Jimmy Whitt	31	G	6'3"	175	RS Junior	Columbia, MO	Graduate transferred to Arkansas

=== Incoming transfers ===
Name	Number	Pos.	Height	Weight	Year	Hometown	Previous college
Tyson Jolly	0	G	6'4"	190	RS Junior	Putnam, OK	Junior college transferred from Trinity Valley CC.
Darius McNeill	2	G	6'3"	182	Junior	Houston, TX	Transferred from California. Under NCAA transfer rules, McNeill will have to sit out for the 2019–20 season. Will have two years of remaining eligibility.
Kendric Davis	3	G	5'11"	180	Sophomore	Houston, TX	Transferred from TCU. Davis was granted a waiver for immediate eligibility on November 20. Will have three years of remaining eligibility.
Emmanuel Bandoumel	5	F	6'5"	180	Sophomore	Quebec City, Canada	Junior college transferred from Hill College.
Isiah Jasey	22	F	6'10"	250	Junior	Killeen, TX	Transferred from Texas A&M in December during the 2018–19 season. Under NCAA transfer rules, Jasey has to sit out until December and will be eligible to start in January during the 2019–20 season. Jasey has one and a half years of remaining eligibility.

=== 2019 recruiting class ===
College recruiting
Name	Hometown	School	Height	Weight	Commit date
Charles Smith; SG	Powder Springs, GA	McEachern High School	6 ft 4 in (1.93 m)	185 lb (84 kg)	May 1, 2019
Charles Smith; SG	Recruit ratings: Scout: Rivals: 247Sports: (4)				
Bryce Cook; PG	Grand Prairie, TX	Sunrise Christian Academy	5 ft 9 in (1.75 m)	150 lb (68 kg)	Aug 3, 2018
Bryce Cook; PG	Recruit ratings: Scout: Rivals: 247Sports: (3)				
Darius McBride; SG	Austin, TX	Westlake High School	6 ft 3 in (1.91 m)	165 lb (75 kg)	Nov 14, 2018
Darius McBride; SG	Recruit ratings: Scout: Rivals: 247Sports: (NR)				
Overall recruit ranking:
Note: In many cases, Scout, Rivals, 247Sports, On3, and ESPN may conflict in their listings of height and weight.; In these cases, the average was taken. ESPN grades are on a 100-point scale.; Sources: "2019 SMU Recruiting List". Rivals.; "2019 SMU Recruiting List". Scout.; "2019 SMU Recruiting List". ESPN.; "Scout.com Team Recruiting Rankings". Scout.; "2019 Team Ranking". Rivals.

== Roster ==
2019–20 SMU Mustangs men's basketball team
Players
Coaches

Pos.	#	Name	Height	Weight	Year	Previous school	Hometown
G	0	Tyson Jolly	6 ft 4 in (1.93 m)	190 lb (86 kg)	RS Jr	Trinity Valley CC	Muskogee, Oklahoma
F	1	Feron Hunt	6 ft 8 in (2.03 m)	195 lb (88 kg)	So	DeSoto High School	DeSoto, Texas
G	2	Darius McNeill (redshirt)	6 ft 3 in (1.91 m)	185 lb (84 kg)	Jr	California	Houston, Texas
G	3	Kendric Davis	5 ft 11 in (1.8 m)	180 lb (82 kg)	So	TCU	Houston, Texas
G	4	Charles Smith IV	6 ft 5 in (1.96 m)	185 lb (84 kg)	Fr	Wheeler High School	Atlanta, Georgia
G	5	Emmanuel Bandoumel	6 ft 4 in (1.93 m)	180 lb (82 kg)	So	Hill College	Quebec City, Canada
G	13	C. J. White (W)	6 ft 5 in (1.96 m)	215 lb (98 kg)	So	Parkview High School	Little Rock, Arkansas
G	14	William Douglas (redshirt)	6 ft 5 in (1.96 m)	193 lb (88 kg)	Jr	Christian Brothers High School	Memphis, Tennessee
F	15	Isiaha Mike	6 ft 8 in (2.03 m)	215 lb (98 kg)	RS Jr	Duquesne	Scarborough, Canada
G	20	Grant Youngkin (W)	6 ft 3 in (1.91 m)	190 lb (86 kg)	RS Jr	Rice	Washington, D.C.
F	21	Jahmar Young Jr. (redshirt)	6 ft 9 in (2.06 m)	215 lb (98 kg)	So	DeSoto High School	Oak Cliff, Texas
F	22	Isiah Jasey	6 ft 10 in (2.08 m)	250 lb (113 kg)	Jr	Texas A&M	Killeen, Texas
G	23	Alex Tabor Jr. (W)	6 ft 2 in (1.88 m)	175 lb (79 kg)	Fr	Charlotte Country Day	Charlotte, North Carolina
F	24	Everett Ray	6 ft 7 in (2.01 m)	220 lb (100 kg)	RS So	Trinity Christian Academy	Irving, Texas
F	25	Ethan Chargois	6 ft 9 in (2.06 m)	235 lb (107 kg)	Jr	Union High School	Tulsa, Oklahoma
G	33	Darius McBride (redshirt)	6 ft 4 in (1.93 m)	190 lb (86 kg)	Fr	Westlake High School	Cedar Park, Texas

Head coach

- Tim Jankovich (Kansas State)

Assistant coach(es)

- K.T. Turner (Oklahoma City)
- Jay Duncan (Northwood)
- Yaphett King (Cal State Fullerton)

Legend

- (C) Team captain
- (S) Suspended
- (I) Ineligible
- (W) Walk-on
- Injured
- Current redshirt

Roster

== Schedule and results ==
Date time, TV	Rank^{#}	Opponent^{#}	Result	Record	Site (attendance) city, state
Regular season
November 5, 2019*; 7:00 pm, ESPN3		Jacksonville State	W 74–65	1–0	Moody Coliseum (4,010); University Park, TX
November 12, 2019*; 7:00 pm, ESPN3		New Orleans	W 77–64	2–0	Moody Coliseum (3,665); University Park, TX
November 16, 2019*; 6:00 pm		Jackson State; Southwestern Showdown	W 80–63	3–0	Moody Coliseum (3,889); University Park, TX
November 18, 2019*; 6:00 pm, ESPN+		at Evansville	W 59–57	4–0	Ford Center (5,639); Evansville, IN
November 23, 2019*; 9:30 pm, Stadium		at UNLV; Southwestern Showdown	W 72–68	5–0	Thomas & Mack Center (7,083); Paradise, NV
November 27, 2019*; 6:00 pm, ESPN3		Hartford; Southwestern Showdown	W 90–58	6–0	Moody Coliseum (3,874); University Park, TX
November 29, 2019*; 7:00 pm, ESPN3		Abilene Christian; Southwestern Showdown	W 70–51	7–0	Moody Coliseum (4,154); University Park, TX
December 3, 2019*; 7:00 pm, ESPN3		Northwestern State	W 77–51	8–0	Moody Coliseum (3,641); University Park, TX
December 7, 2019*; 8:30 pm, ESPNU		Georgetown	L 74–91	8–1	Moody Coliseum (5,855); University Park, TX
December 20, 2019*; 6:00 pm, SECN		at Georgia	L 85–87 ^{2OT}	8–2	Stegeman Coliseum (10,351); Athens, GA
December 23, 2019*; 6:00 pm, ESPN3		Georgia State	W 85–76	9–2	Moody Coliseum (4,085); University Park, TX
January 1, 2020; 4:00 pm, ESPNU		South Florida	W 82–64	10–2 (1–0)	Moody Coliseum (3,980); University Park, TX
January 4, 2020*; 8:00 pm, SECN		at Vanderbilt; American/SEC Alliance	W 92–81 ^{OT}	11–2	Memorial Gymnaisum (9,141); Nashville, TN
January 8, 2020; 7:00 pm, ESPN3		UCF	W 81–74	12–2 (2–0)	Moody Coliseum (4,011); University Park, TX
January 11, 2020; 1:00 pm, ESPNU		at East Carolina	L 68–71	12–3 (2–1)	Williams Arena (4,014); Greenville, NC
January 15, 2020; 8:00 pm, CBSSN		at Houston; Rivalry	L 62–71	12–4 (2–2)	Fertitta Center (6,584); Houston, TX
January 18, 2020; 7:00 pm, ESPNU		Temple	W 68–52	13–4 (3–2)	Moody Coliseum (4,726); University Park, TX
January 22, 2020; 7:00 pm, ESPN3		East Carolina	W 84–64	14–4 (4–2)	Moody Coliseum (3,878); University Park, TX
January 25, 2020; 3:00 pm, CBSSN		at No. 20 Memphis	W 74–70	15–4 (5–2)	FedExForum (17,090); Memphis, TN
January 28, 2020; 6:00 pm, ESPNews		at Cincinnati	L 43–65	15–5 (5–3)	Fifth Third Arena (11,221); Cincinnati, OH
February 1, 2020; 7:00 pm, ESPNU		Tulane	W 82–67	16–5 (6–3)	Moody Coliseum (4,477); University Park, TX
February 8, 2020; 11:00 am, ESPNU		at Temple	L 90–97 ^{OT}	16–6 (6–4)	Liacouras Center (7,615); Philadelphia, PA
February 12, 2020; 6:00 pm, ESPNews		UConn	W 79–75	17–6 (7–4)	Moody Coliseum (4,249); University Park, TX
February 15, 2020; 5:00 pm, ESPNU		No. 20 Houston; Rivalry	W 73–72 ^{OT}	18–6 (8–4)	Moody Coliseum (5,534); University Park, TX
February 19, 2020; 7:00 pm, ESPN3		at Tulane	L 72–80	18–7 (8–5)	Devlin Fieldhouse (1,150); New Orleans, LA
February 22, 2020; 2:00 pm, ESPNews		at Tulsa	L 57–79	18–8 (8–6)	Reynolds Center (4,690); Tulsa, OK
February 25, 2020; 8:00 pm, CBSSN		Memphis	W 58–53	19–8 (9–6)	Moody Coliseum (5,211); University Park, TX
March 1, 2020; 3:00 pm, ESPNU		Wichita State	L 62–66	19–9 (9–7)	Moody Coliseum (5,483); University Park, TX
March 4, 2020; 6:00 pm, ESPN3		at UCF	L 58–61	19–10 (9–8)	Addition Financial Arena (4,591); Orlando, FL
March 7, 2020; 6:00 pm, ESPN3		at South Florida	L 60–61	19–11 (9–9)	Yuengling Center (3,587); Tampa, FL
AAC tournament
March 12, 2020; 7:00 pm, ESPNU	(7)	vs. (10) Temple; First Round	Cancelled		Dickies Arena; Fort Worth, TX
*Non-conference game. ^{#}Rankings from AP Poll. (#) Tournament seedings in parentheses. All times are in Central Time.

1.Cancelled due to the Coronavirus Pandemic

== Awards and honors ==
=== American Athletic Conference honors ===
==== All-AAC Third Team ====
- Kendric Davis
- Tyson Jolly
- Isiaha Mike
