= 2019–20 McNeese State Cowboys basketball team =

American college basketball season

2019–20 McNeese State Cowboys basketball
- Conference: Southland Conference
- Record: 15–17 (10–10 Southland)
- Head coach: Heath Schroyer (2nd season)
- Associate head coach: John Aiken
- Assistant coaches: Mike Dubose; Jalen Courtney
- Home arena: Health and Human Performance Education Complex; Capacity (4,200)

2019–20 Southland Conference men's basketball standings
	Conf.				Overall
Team	W		L	PCT	W		L	PCT
Stephen F. Austin	19	–	1	.950	28	–	3	.903
Abilene Christian	15	–	5	.750	20	–	11	.645
Nicholls	15	–	5	.750	21	–	10	.677
Sam Houston State	11	–	9	.550	18	–	13	.581
Northwestern State	11	–	9	.550	15	–	15	.500
Lamar	10	–	10	.500	17	–	15	.531
McNeese State	10	–	10	.500	15	–	17	.469
Texas A&M–CC	10	–	10	.500	14	–	18	.438
Central Arkansas	9	–	11	.450	10	–	21	.323
Incarnate Word	6	–	14	.300	9	–	22	.290
New Orleans	5	–	15	.250	9	–	21	.300
Southeastern Louisiana	5	–	15	.250	8	–	23	.258
Houston Baptist	4	–	16	.200	4	–	25	.138
Note: The 2020 SLC tournament was canceled after the first round due to the COVID-19 pandemic.

The 2019–20 McNeese State Cowboys basketball team represented McNeese State University in the 2019–20 NCAA Division I men's basketball season. The Cowboys, led by second-year head coach Heath Schroyer, played their home games at the Health and Human Performance Education Complex in Lake Charles, Louisiana as members of the Southland Conference. They finished the season 15–17, 10–10 in Southland play to finish in a three-way tie for sixth place. They lost in the first round of the Southland tournament to Lamar.

== Previous season ==
The Cowboys finished the 2018–19 season 9–22 overall, 5–13 in Southland play to finish in 12th place. Since only the top eight teams are eligible for the Southland tournament, they failed to qualify.

== Roster ==
2019–20 McNeese State Cowboys men's basketball team
Players
Coaches

Pos.	#	Name	Height	Weight	Year	Hometown
G	0	Dru Kuxhausen	6 ft 0 in (1.83 m)	180 lb (82 kg)	Jr	Scottsbluff, Nebraska
F	1	Jeremy Harrell	6 ft 8 in (2.03 m)	240 lb (109 kg)	Jr	Pickens, Mississippi
G	2	Sam Baker	6 ft 4 in (1.93 m)	220 lb (100 kg)	Jr	Rochester, Minnesota
G	3	Leondre Washington	6 ft 0 in (1.83 m)	170 lb (77 kg)	Jr	Englewood, New Jersey
G	5	Evan Palmquist	6 ft 4 in (1.93 m)	185 lb (84 kg)	Fr	Houston, Texas
G	10	Luis Rivas	6 ft 5 in (1.96 m)	190 lb (86 kg)	Jr	Guadalajara, Mexico
PG	11	Myles Hutchinson	6 ft 1 in (1.85 m)	180 lb (82 kg)	Jr	Abbeville, Louisiana
G	12	A.J. Lawson	6 ft 5 in (1.96 m)	215 lb (98 kg)	RS Jr	Bryan, Texas
G	13	Trey Johnson	6 ft 2 in (1.88 m)	175 lb (79 kg)	So	Baton Rouge, Louisiana
G	20	Jalen Poyser	6 ft 4 in (1.93 m)	180 lb (82 kg)	Sr	Malton, Ontario, Canada
G	22	Roydell Brown	6 ft 6 in (1.98 m)	220 lb (100 kg)	Sr	New Orleans, Louisiana
F	23	Sha'markus Kennedy	6 ft 8 in (2.03 m)	220 lb (100 kg)	Sr	Tuscaloosa, Alabama
F	24	Chris Orlina	6 ft 6 in (1.98 m)	185 lb (84 kg)	Jr	Norfolk, Virginia
F	44	Truman Moore	6 ft 8 in (2.03 m)	240 lb (109 kg)	So	Gilbert, Arizona
F/C		Kentrevious Jones	6 ft 10 in (2.08 m)	290 lb (132 kg)	Fr	Macon, Georgia
G		Ra'Shawn Langston	6 ft 3 in (1.91 m)	200 lb (91 kg)	Jr	Little Rock, Arkansas
G		Collin Warren	6 ft 4 in (1.93 m)	188 lb (85 kg)	Fr	Houston, Texas

Head coach

- Heath Schroyer

Assistant coach(es)

- John Aiken
- Mike Dubose
- Jalen Courtney

Legend

- (C) Team captain
- (S) Suspended
- (I) Ineligible
- (W) Walk-on
- Injured
- Current redshirt

Roster
Last update: November 26, 2019

== Schedule and results ==
Date time, TV	Rank^{#}	Opponent^{#}	Result	Record	Site (attendance) city, state
Non-conference regular season
November 6, 2019*; 6:00 pm, ESPN+		at Western Michigan	L 65–75	0–1	University Arena (1,690); Kalamazoo, MI
November 9, 2019*; 7:00 pm, ESPN+		at Louisiana	L 80–85	0–2	Cajundome (4,233); Lafayette, LA
November 11, 2019*; 6:30 pm, Cowboy Insider		Southern–New Orleans	W 104–33	1–2	H&HP Complex (2,514); Lake Charles, LA
November 13, 2019*; 6:00 pm, BTN		at Wisconsin; Legends Classic campus-site game	L 63–83	1–3	Kohl Center (16,816); Madison, WI
November 16, 2019*; 5:00 pm, Mountain West Network		at New Mexico; Legends Classic campus-site game	L 80–90	1–4	The Pit (10,501); Albuquerque, NM
November 18, 2019*; 6:30 pm, Cowboy Insider		Arlington Baptist	W 103–51	2–4	H&HP Complex (2,566); Lake Charles, LA
November 22, 2019*; 6:00 pm, ESPN+		at Richmond; Legends Classic campus-site game	L 57–87	2–5	Robins Center (4,765); Richmond, VA
November 30, 2019*; 1:00 pm, LHN		at Texas	L 71–73	2–6	Frank Erwin Center (8,482); Austin, TX
December 3, 2019*; 6:30 pm		Campbellsville–Harrodsburg	W 107–61	3–6	H&HP Complex (2,237); Lake Charles, LA
December 10, 2019*; 6:30 pm		Kansas City	W 82–73	4–6	H&HP Complex (2,449); Lake Charles, LA
December 18, 2019*; 7:30 pm		Paul Quinn	W 109–67	5–6	H&HP Complex (2,489); Lake Charles, LA
Southland regular season
December 21, 2019; 3:00 pm		Stephen F. Austin	L 73–81	5–7 (0–1)	H&HP Complex (3,565); Lake Charles, LA
January 2, 2020; 6:30 pm		Sam Houston State	L 75–94	5–8 (0–2)	H&HP Complex (2,461); Lake Charles, LA
January 4, 2020; 3:00 pm		at Central Arkansas	L 69–79	5–9 (0–3)	Farris Center (678); Conway, AR
January 8, 2020; 7:00 pm		at Abilene Christian	W 88–84	6–9 (1–3)	Moody Coliseum (815); Abilene, TX
January 11, 2020; 3:30 pm		Northwestern State	W 85–76	7–9 (2–3)	H&HP Complex (3,016); Lake Charles, LA
January 15, 2020; 6:30 pm		Incarnate Word	W 72–56	8–9 (3–3)	H&HP Complex (2,356); Lake Charles, LA
January 18, 2020; 6:00 pm		at New Orleans	W 65–52	9–9 (4–3)	Lakefront Arena (1,253); New Orleans, LA
January 22, 2020; 7:00 pm		at Southeastern Louisiana	W 77–61	10–9 (5–3)	University Center (772); Hammond, LA
January 25, 2020; 3:30 pm		Houston Baptist	W 102–89	11–9 (6–3)	H&HP Complex (3,214); Lake Charles, LA
January 29, 2020; 6:30 pm		Nicholls	W 80–74 ^{OT}	12–9 (7–3)	H&HP Complex (3,623); Lake Charles, LA
February 1, 2020; 3:30 pm		Lamar	L 91–96	12–10 (7–4)	H&HP Complex (4,134); Lake Charles, LA
February 5, 2020; 7:00 pm		at Texas A&M–Corpus Christi	L 62–69	12–11 (7–5)	American Bank Center (1,400); Corpus Christi, TX
February 8, 2020; 7:00 pm		Central Arkansas	L 76–82 ^{OT}	12–12 (7–6)	H&HP Complex (3,789); Lake Charles, LA
February 15, 2020; 3:00 pm		at Northwestern State	L 79–84	12–13 (7–7)	Prather Coliseum (907); Natchitoches, LA
February 19, 2020; 7:00 pm		at Incarnate Word	L 59–65	12–14 (7–8)	McDermott Center (409); San Antonio, TX
February 22, 2020; 3:30 pm		New Orleans	L 77–82	12–15 (7–9)	H&HP Complex (2,221); Lake Charles, LA
February 26, 2020; 6:30 pm		Southeastern Louisiana	W 104–82	13–15 (8–9)	H&HP Complex (2,670); Lake Charles, LA
February 29, 2020; 7:00 pm		at Houston Baptist	W 100–80	14–15 (9–9)	Sharp Gymnasium (853); Houston, TX
March 4, 2020; 7:00 pm		at Nicholls	L 56–80	14–16 (9–10)	Stopher Gymnasium (879); Thibodaux, LA
March 7, 2020; 7:00 pm, ESPN3		at Lamar	W 70–66	15–16 (10–10)	Montagne Center (3,847); Beaumont, TX
Southland tournament
March 11, 2020; 7:30 pm, ESPN+	(7)	vs. (6) Lamar; First round	L 59–80	15–17	Merrell Center; Katy, TX
*Non-conference game. ^{#}Rankings from AP Poll. (#) Tournament seedings in parentheses. All times are in Central.

== See also ==
2019–20 McNeese State Cowgirls basketball team
