= 2019–20 Texas A&M–Corpus Christi Islanders men's basketball team =

American college basketball season

2019–20 Texas A&M–Corpus Christi Islanders men's basketball
- Conference: Southland Conference
- Record: 14–18 (10–10 Southland)
- Head coach: Willis Wilson (9th season)
- Associate head coach: Marty Gross
- Assistant coaches: Mark Dannhoff; Terry Johnson
- Home arena: American Bank Center; Dugan Wellness Center

2019–20 Southland Conference men's basketball standings
| | Conf. | | | | Overall |
| Team | W | | L | PCT | W | | L | PCT |
|---|---|---|---|---|---|---|---|---|
| Stephen F. Austin | 19 | – | 1 | .950 | 28 | – | 3 | .903 |
| Abilene Christian | 15 | – | 5 | .750 | 20 | – | 11 | .645 |
| Nicholls | 15 | – | 5 | .750 | 21 | – | 10 | .677 |
| Sam Houston State | 11 | – | 9 | .550 | 18 | – | 13 | .581 |
| Northwestern State | 11 | – | 9 | .550 | 15 | – | 15 | .500 |
| Lamar | 10 | – | 10 | .500 | 17 | – | 15 | .531 |
| McNeese State | 10 | – | 10 | .500 | 15 | – | 17 | .469 |
| Texas A&M–CC | 10 | – | 10 | .500 | 14 | – | 18 | .438 |
| Central Arkansas | 9 | – | 11 | .450 | 10 | – | 21 | .323 |
| Incarnate Word | 6 | – | 14 | .300 | 9 | – | 22 | .290 |
| New Orleans | 5 | – | 15 | .250 | 9 | – | 21 | .300 |
| Southeastern Louisiana | 5 | – | 15 | .250 | 8 | – | 23 | .258 |
| Houston Baptist | 4 | – | 16 | .200 | 4 | – | 25 | .138 |
Note: The 2020 SLC tournament was canceled after the first round due to the COVID-19 pandemic.

The 2019–20 Texas A&M–Corpus Christi Islanders men's basketball team represented Texas A&M University–Corpus Christi in the 2019–20 NCAA Division I men's basketball season. The Islanders, led by ninth-year head coach Willis Wilson, played their home games at American Bank Center, with three games at the Dugan Wellness Center, both of which are in Corpus Christi, Texas, as members of the Southland Conference. They finished the season 14–18, 10–10 in Southland play to finish in a three-way tie for sixth place. They lost in the first round of the Southland tournament to Northwestern State.

== Previous season ==
The Islanders finished the 2018–19 season 14–18 overall, 9–9 in Southland play to finish in sixth place. As the No. 6 seed in the Southland tournament, they were defeated in the first round by Central Arkansas.

== Roster ==
2019–20 Texas A&M–Corpus Christi Islanders men's basketball team
Players
Coaches

| Pos. | # | Name | Height | Weight | Year | Hometown |
|---|---|---|---|---|---|---|
| F | 0 | Aristotelis Sotiriou | 6 ft 8 in (2.03 m) | 210 lb (95 kg) | Fr | Athens, Greece |
| G | 1 | Jordan Hairston | 6 ft 0 in (1.83 m) | 160 lb (73 kg) | Fr | Centreville, Virginia |
| G | 2 | Myles Smith | 6 ft 0 in (1.83 m) | 190 lb (86 kg) | Jr | Klein, Texas |
| G/F | 3 | Jalen White | 6 ft 5 in (1.96 m) | 245 lb (111 kg) | Fr | St. Petersburg, Florida |
| G | 4 | Jashawn Talton-Thomas | 6 ft 5 in (1.96 m) | 210 lb (95 kg) | Sr | Oklahoma City, Oklahoma |
| G | 5 | Javae Lampkins | 6 ft 1 in (1.85 m) | 180 lb (82 kg) | So | Washington, D.C. |
| F | 10 | Perry Francois | 6 ft 8 in (2.03 m) | 240 lb (109 kg) | Jr | North Miami, Florida |
| G | 11 | Evan Smith | 6 ft 0 in (1.83 m) | 185 lb (84 kg) | Fr | Spring, Texas |
| G | 12 | Peyton Smith | 6 ft 2 in (1.88 m) | 195 lb (88 kg) | Jr | Corpus Christi, Texas |
| F | 14 | Elijah Schmidt | 6 ft 8 in (2.03 m) | 220 lb (100 kg) | Sr | Spring, Texas |
| F | 15 | Irshaad Hunte | 6 ft 8 in (2.03 m) | 215 lb (98 kg) | Sr | Toronto, Ontario |
| G | 23 | Jalon Clark | 6 ft 6 in (1.98 m) | 230 lb (104 kg) | So | Houston, Texas |
| G/F | 24 | Edgars Kaufmanis | 6 ft 4 in (1.93 m) | 200 lb (91 kg) | So | Valmiera, Latvia |
| G | 32 | Nolan Bertain | 6 ft 4 in (1.93 m) | 185 lb (84 kg) | Jr | Portland, Oregon |
| F | 35 | Tony Lewis | 6 ft 10 in (2.08 m) | 265 lb (120 kg) | Sr | San Antonio, Texas |

Head coach

- Willis Wilson (Rice)

Assistant coach(es)

- Marty Gross (Jacksonville)
- Mark Dannhoff (UW–La Crosse)
- Terry Johnson (Stanislaus State)

Legend

- (C) Team captain
- (S) Suspended
- (I) Ineligible
- (W) Walk-on
- Injured
- Current redshirt

Roster
Last update: November 26, 2019

== Schedule and results ==
| Date time, TV | Rank^{#} | Opponent^{#} | Result | Record | Site (attendance) city, state |
Exhibition
| November 1, 2019*; 7:30 pm | | Concordia (TX) | W 81–71 | | American Bank Center; Corpus Christi, TX |
Regular season
| November 6, 2019*; 7:00 pm, KDF | | Louisiana Tech | L 49–82 | 0–1 | American Bank Center (1,027); Corpus Christi, TX |
| November 11, 2019*; 7:00 pm, SECN | | at Vanderbilt | L 66–71 | 0–2 | Memorial Gymnasium (8,300); Nashville, TN |
| November 15, 2019*; 7:30 pm | | Stony Brook; Islander Invitational | L 63–68 | 0–3 | American Bank Center (1,078); Corpus Christi, TX |
| November 16, 2019*; 6:30 pm, KRIS | | North Dakota State; Islander Invitational | L 45–57 | 0–4 | American Bank Center (1,108); Corpus Christi, TX |
| November 17, 2019*; 4:00 pm, KRIS-DT2 CW | | Texas–Rio Grande Valley; South Texas Showdown | W 63–55 | 1–4 | American Bank Center (978); Corpus Christi, TX |
| November 23, 2019*; 3:30 pm | | St. Thomas (TX) | W 69–59 | 2–4 | Dugan Wellness Center (1,005); Corpus Christi, TX |
| November 30, 2019*; 7:00 pm | | at Texas–Rio Grande Valley; South Texas Showdown | W 63–55 | 3–4 | UTRGV Fieldhouse (978); Edinburg, TX |
| December 3, 2019*; 7:00 pm | | at UTSA | L 67–89 | 3–5 | Convocation Center (939); San Antonio, TX |
| December 7, 2019*; 3:30 pm | | St. Mary's (TX) | W 81–53 | 4–5 | Dugan Wellness Center (975); Corpus Christi, TX |
| December 15, 2019*; 5:00 pm, SECN+ | | at Texas A&M | L 60–63 | 4–6 | Reed Arena (5,846); College Station, TX |
| December 18, 2019; 7:00 pm | | at Nicholls | L 58–64 | 4–7 (0–1) | Stopher Gymnasium (360); Thibodaux, LA |
| December 21, 2019; 1:00 pm | | at Central Arkansas | L 67–71 | 4–8 (0–2) | Farris Center (207); Conway, AR |
| December 29, 2019*; 3:00 pm, BTN | | at Nebraska | L 52–73 | 4–9 | Pinnacle Bank Arena (14,968); Lincoln, NE |
| January 2, 2020; 7:00 pm, KZTV | | Northwestern State | W 67–62 | 5–9 (1–2) | American Bank Center (1,237); Corpus Christi, TX |
| January 4, 2020; 3:30 pm | | Southeastern Louisiana | L 80–84 | 5–10 (1–3) | American Bank Center (1,107); Corpus Christi, TX |
| January 8, 2020; 6:30 pm, ESPN3 | | at Stephen F. Austin | W 73–72 | 6–10 (2–3) | William R. Johnson Coliseum (822); Nacogdoches, TX |
| January 11, 2020; 3:30 pm, ESPN3 | | at Abilene Christian | L 56–68 | 6–11 (2–4) | Moody Coliseum (1,011); Abilene, TX |
| January 15, 2020; 7:00 pm | | at Southeastern Louisiana | L 56–62 | 6–12 (2–5) | University Center (570); Hammond, LA |
| January 18, 2020; 3:30 pm, KDF or KRIS | | Lamar | W 64–58 | 7–12 (3–5) | American Bank Center (1,711); Corpus Christi, TX |
| January 22, 2020; 7:00 pm | | New Orleans | W 74–71 | 8–12 (4–5) | American Bank Center (1,438); Corpus Christi, TX |
| January 25, 2020; 4:15 pm | | at Incarnate Word | W 68–47 | 9–12 (5–5) | McDermott Center (444); San Antonio, TX |
| January 29, 2020; 6:30 pm, ESPN+ | | at Sam Houston State | L 61–80 | 9–13 (5–6) | Bernard Johnson Coliseum (1,029); Huntsville, TX |
| February 1, 2020; 7:00 pm | | at Houston Baptist | L 77–82 | 9–14 (5–7) | Sharp Gymnasium (802); Houston, TX |
| February 5, 2020; 7:00 pm, KDF | | McNeese State | W 69–62 | 10–14 (6–7) | American Bank Center (1,400); Corpus Christi, TX |
| February 12, 2020; 7:00 pm, KDF | | Stephen F. Austin | L 67–75 | 10–15 (6–8) | American Bank Center (1,537); Corpus Christi, TX |
| February 15, 2020; 3:30 pm, KDF | | Abilene Christian | L 64–78 | 10–16 (6–9) | American Bank Center (1,259); Corpus Christi, TX |
| February 22, 2020; 4:30 pm, ESPN+ | | at Lamar | L 62–79 | 10–17 (6–10) | Montagne Center (2,841); Beaumont, TX |
| February 26, 2020; 7:00 pm | | at New Orleans | W 81–75 | 11–17 (7–10) | Lakefront Arena (364); New Orleans, LA |
| February 29, 2020; 5:30 pm, ESPN+ | | Incarnate Word | W 78–70 | 12–17 (8–10) | American Bank Center (2,678); Corpus Christi, TX |
| March 4, 2020; 7:00 pm, KDF or KRIS | | Sam Houston State | W 71–60 | 13–17 (9–10) | American Bank Center (1,202); Corpus Christi, TX |
| March 7, 2020; 3:30 pm | | Houston Baptist | W 84–78 | 14–17 (10–10) | American Bank Center (1,637); Corpus Christi, TX |
Southland tournament
| March 11, 2020; 5:00 pm, ESPN+ | (8) | vs. (5) Northwestern State; First round | L 62–79 | 14–18 | Merrell Center; Katy, TX |
*Non-conference game. ^{#}Rankings from AP Poll. (#) Tournament seedings in parentheses. All times are in Central.

== See also ==
- 2019–20 Texas A&M–Corpus Christi Islanders women's basketball team
