= Big Blue Nation =

Fans of University of Kentucky sports

The Big Blue Nation is the fan base of University of Kentucky (UK) athletics programs, particularly the men's basketball team, the women's basketball team and the football team. The Big Blue Nation is a reference to both the signature color of UK athletics (blue) and the fact that when the Wildcats play at a neutral site and occasionally at an away game, the school's fans frequently make up a disproportionate majority of the crowd. For example, Pat Forde, a resident of Kentucky's largest city of Louisville and then a columnist with Yahoo Sports, remarked after the 2014–15 men's basketball team finished its regular season undefeated,

The Southeastern Conference tournament is in nearby Nashville, and you can expect the seats to be 90 percent blue when the Cats play. Then they'll start the NCAA tournament in Louisville's home area, the Yum Center (sic), in a city where about 40 percent of the population roots for UK. The following weekend assuredly will be spent in Cleveland, a manageable drive from the Bluegrass State, and the Final Four is in Indianapolis, which is 114 miles up I-65 from the Ohio River that separates Kentucky and Indiana. You could put NCAA tourney sites in Kabul, Marrakesh and Reykjavík, and Kentucky would have the most fans in the gym. But when you make the commute this easy, the Big Blue occupation will be overwhelming.

Fans sometimes range beyond the borders of their nation, with anecdotal evidence suggesting the Wildcats men's basketball team once even drew a sizable horde of blue-clad supporters at an exhibition game in Japan.

In The Winning Tradition: A History of Kentucky Wildcat Basketball, Bert Nelli wrote that many rival coaches consider Wildcat fans to be among the most knowledgeable in the country. Former Wildcat Jack "Goose" Givens, who later played for the NBA's Atlanta Hawks, has said that UK fans are generally more interested and informed than the typical NBA fan.

'Citizens' of the Big Blue Nation often go to extremes in showing their support. It is not uncommon to see fans with everything from blue wigs to bodies covered in blue paint. While known for being fiercely loyal, these fans are at times impatient and highly critical of their teams. Former coach Tubby Smith drew the ire of his fan base because of a perceived decline in the quality of both recruiting and on-court play.

On July 2, 2015, Sports Dating Inc., a company based in UK's home city of Lexington, launched BBNMeetup.com, an online dating site devoted to UK fans, with users allowed to create profiles before the site went fully live on July 15. The site will offer most features of mainstream dating sites, with an additional metric of "fandom" (i.e., level of enthusiasm for the Wildcats). As of 2025, that site is no longer active. The site's Twitter feed alleged that the user demand for the site was high enough to cause a server crash, although ESPN.com writer Eamonn Brennan dismissed that claim as "clever marketing".

== Records ==
The UK men's basketball team was first in the nation in home court attendance from 1978 to 1984 and again from 1996 to 2004. In the intervening period from 1985 to 1995, they were led only by Syracuse University. After again finishing number 2 to Syracuse in 2005, the Wildcats reclaimed the top spot in 2006 and have led every year since (up to 2011).

When the Wildcats also played Michigan State University in 'The Basketbowl' at Detroit's Ford Field on December 13, 2003, the game set the all-time attendance record for a men's college basketball game at 78,129. The game was also a 79–74 victory for the Wildcats.
