= Colt =

Colt(s) or COLT may refer to:

- Colt (horse), a young male horse

== Arts and entertainment ==
- Colts Drum and Bugle Corps, from Dubuque, Iowa, US
- The Colt (film), a 2005 television movie
- The Colt (Supernatural), a fictional firearm

== Businesses and brands ==
- Colt Car Company, the British importer of Mitsubishi Motors
- Colt Group, a heating, ventilation, and air conditioning company
- Colt International, an aviation service company
- Colt Studio Group, an American gay pornography company
- Colt Technology Services, formerly City Of London Telecommunications, a multinational telecommunications company
- Colt's Manufacturing Company, an American firearms company
- Colt (cigarette), a cigarette brand

== People and fictional characters ==
- Colt (given name), including a list of people and fictional characters with the given name or nickname
- Colt (surname), including a list of people and fictional characters with the surname
- Colt baronets, a title in the Baronetage of England

== Places ==
- Colt, Arkansas, United States, a town
- Colt, Louisiana, United States, an unincorporated community
- Camp Colt, Pennsylvania, United States, a World War I tank training installation
- Colt Island, County Dublin, Ireland

== Sport ==
=== Mascots ===
- Sanford H. Calhoun High School
- Covina High School
- Parkway Central High School
- West Jessamine High School
- Thurston High School

=== Sports teams ===
==== Baseball ====
- Augusta Colts, a former indoor football team based in Augusta, Georgia, US
- Calgary Colts, a junior football team based in Calgary, Alberta, Canada
- Chicago Cubs, a Major League Baseball franchise known as the Colts 1890–1897
- Houston Colt .45s, former Major League Baseball club, later renamed as the Houston Astros
- Portland Colts, a former minor league baseball team in Portland, Oregon, US
- Richmond Colts, a minor league baseball team based in Richmond, Virginia, US on-and-off from 1894 to 1953
- San Angelo Colts, a professional baseball team based in San Angelo, Texas, US
  - San Angelo Colts (1948–1957), a minor league baseball team

==== Gridiron football ====
- Baltimore Colts (1947–1950), an All-American Football Conference franchise
- Baltimore Colts, a National Football League team 1953–1983, afterward relocating to Indianapolis
  - Indianapolis Colts

==== Ice hockey in Canada ====
- Barrie Colts, an Ontario Hockey League franchise
- Cornwall Colts, a hockey team
- Cranbrook Colts, a defunct Junior "A" and "B" hockey team in Cranbrook, British Columbia
- Mountainview Colts a Junior "B" ice hockey team based in Didsbury, Alberta

==== Association football ====
- Devonshire Colts F.C., a football club in Bermuda

=== Stadiums ===
- Colt Stadium, in Houston, Texas, United States

== Transportation ==
=== Automobiles ===
- Colt, a marque used by Colt Car Company to sell Mitsubishi Motors vehicles in the UK 1974–1984
- Mitsubishi Colt, the name of several Mitsubishi Motors automobiles
- Dodge Colt and Plymouth Colt, a subcompact car manufactured by Mitsubishi 1971–1994
- Dodge/Plymouth Colt Vista, a version of the Mitsubishi Chariot 1983–1996
- Colt Runabout, an early American automobile

=== Aircraft ===
- Antonov An-2, a Soviet biplane, NATO reporting name Colt
- Colt, a version of the Piper PA-20 training aircraft
- Texas Aircraft Colt, an American light-sport aircraft

=== Other uses in transportation ===
- County of Lackawanna Transit System (COLTS), the public transport operator in Lackawanna County, Pennsylvania, US

== Other uses ==
- Colt (libraries), open source JAVA programming libraries
- Ragen's Colts, an early 20th century Irish Chicago street gang
- Bergen Corpus of London Teenage Language, a spoken language corpus of English

== See also ==
- Colt 45 (disambiguation)
- Kolt (disambiguation)
- Cult
