= History of jewellery in Ukraine =

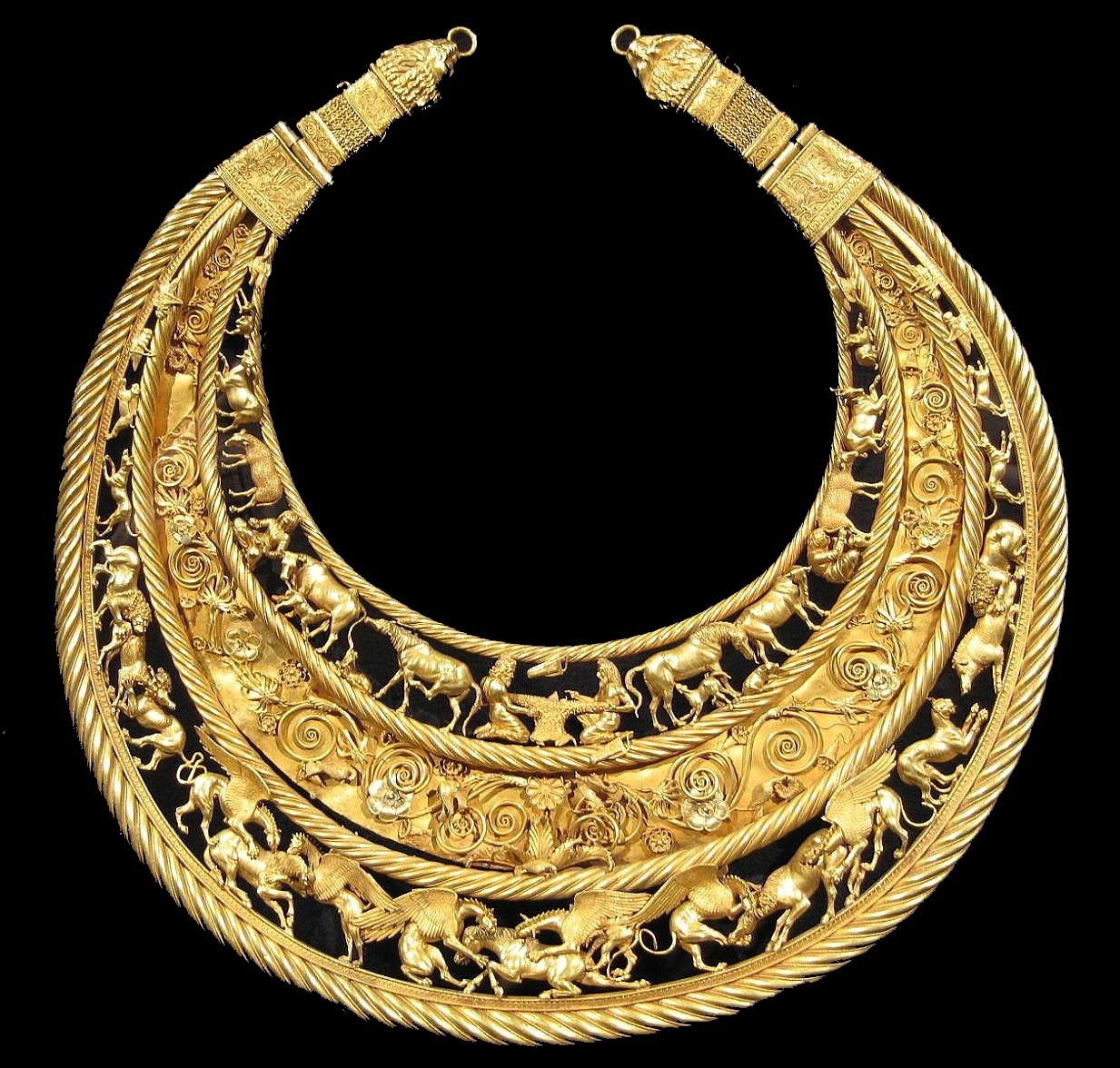
Golden pectoral, 4th century BC, Tovsta Mohyla, Museum of Historical Treasures of Ukraine.

The history of jewellery in Ukraine reflects the influence of many cultures and peoples who have occupied the territory in the past and present.

== Contribution of autochthon cultures ==
Jewellery as an art form originated as an expression of human culture. Body ornamentation, one purpose of jewellery, has been known since at least the Stone Age.

The first known jewellery from the territory that is now Ukraine dates back to the Mousterian period (Old Stone Age). It is represented by two bracelets made of Mammoth ivory, decorated with the earliest known meander ornamentation, and a shell necklace found at the Mizyn archeological site. Archeological data prove the presence of many precursory cultures (Neolithic Corded Ware culture, Globular Amphora culture, Yamna culture, pre-Slavic Cherniakhiv culture, Zarubyntsi culture, Przeworsk culture and others) that have existed on Ukrainian terrain. These cultures were advanced in metal craft techniques. Some of them co-existed with the Trypillian farmers and nomadic tribes. Copper production workshops have been found at Yamna culture archaeological sites. Forging, Lost-wax casting, and casting in forms became common techniques. Artisans of the Bronze Age made armlets, hairpins, pendants, and fibulae.

Jewellery artifacts from the Bronze Age found in Ukraine
Choker?	Torc?	Torc	Armlet	Pendant-knife

== Jewellery of peoples that migrated through Ukraine ==
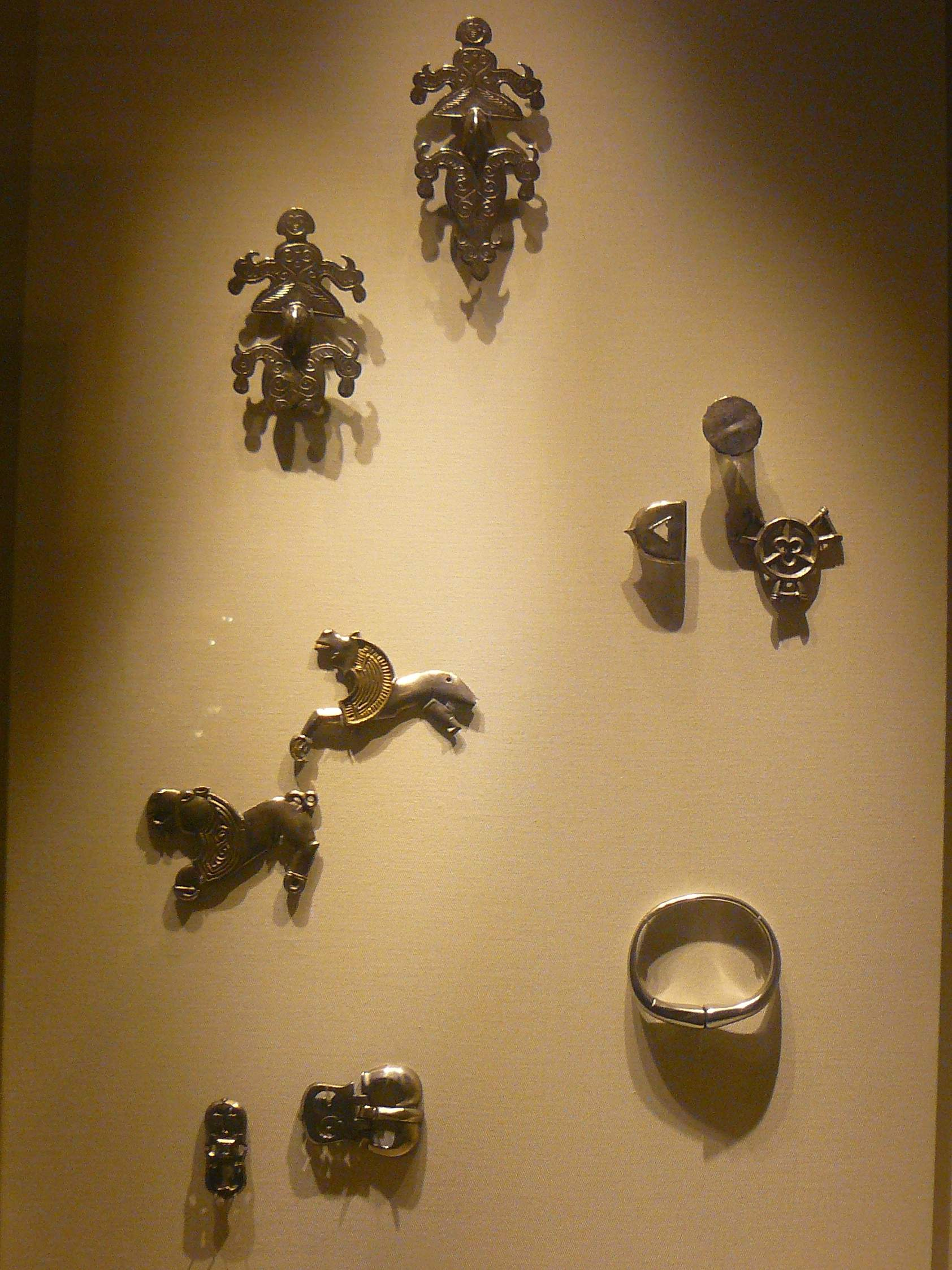
Martynivka Treasure of the Penkovka culture

In the Neolithic, the Trypillians in Ukraine made jewellery of naturally occurring metals such as copper. The pieces included spiral armlets, rings, diadems, and necklaces from shells, copper tubes, and mother-of-pearl discs. In the 8th to 6th centuries BCE, the Cimmerians brought new artistry to jewellery making. Many Cimmerian pieces, made of bronze and iron, had floral and animal-based themes.

Fertile soils and a favorable climate along the Black Sea coast and the Dnieper River attracted Greek traders and colonists from the 7th century BCE onwards. Scythians, who had come from Iran and who displaced the Cimmerians, appeared in the territories around the Black Sea around 500 BCE. They prospered in the area for a long time, and traded with the Greeks. Many masterpieces created by Greek and Scythian goldsmiths are widely known. For body, armament and harness ornaments, they employed all of the metalwork techniques common at the time. These consisted of casting, chasing, engraving, gilding, inlaying, stonesetting and others. The images of fantastic animals, (griffins, sphinxes, winged animals, and beasts with human heads) were depicted in their works with a distinctive style. Stylization of images developed into a realistic method of interpreting complicated zoomorphic compositions. Techniques improved considerably during the prosperous times of the Scythian state.

The Sarmatians conquered and then occupied the Scythian kingdom by c. 200 BCE. Sarmatian culture introduced new traditions, including polychrome style, an example of which is a process by which an image of an animal's body is covered with inserts of blue paste or turquoise in soldered mountings

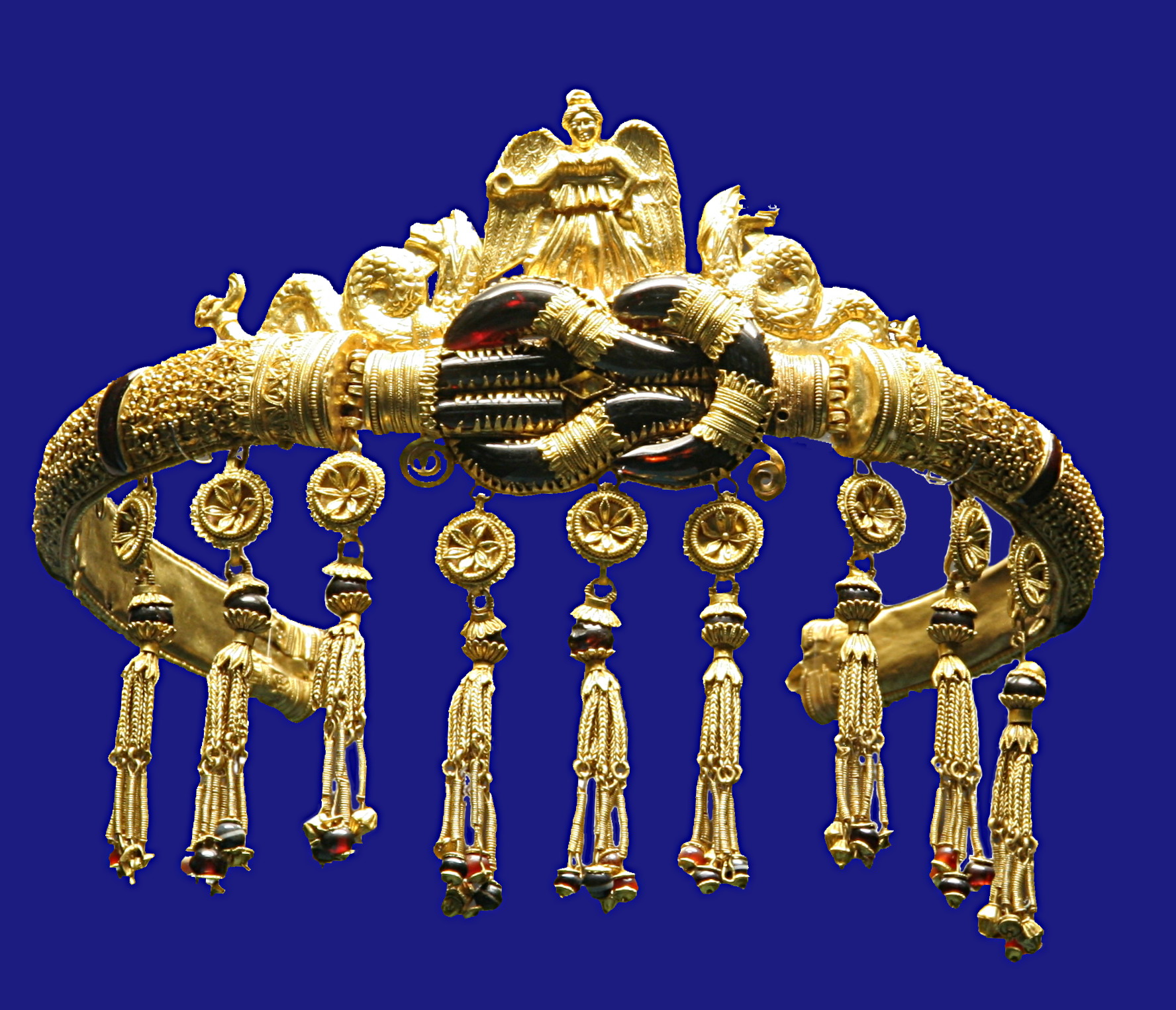
Greek jewellery, 300 BCE, showing a Heracles knot

Greek art of the Black Sea region influenced the Sarmatian style. Most notably it increased the color range. Together with precious metals and gems, glass is found in the jewellery of this time. Greek brooch-fibulas were often made in this style.

By the 3rd century BCE Celtic art began to penetrate into southern regions of present-day Ukrainian territory. In Roman provinces a renaissance of Celtic handicrafts took place, in particularly in the form of jewellery. These ornaments were introduced near the Black Sea and points further north. Another entry point for Celtic jewellery into the present-day territory of Ukraine was trade and cultural contacts with northern tribes. Celtic art and culture spread into the British Isles, Germany and the Baltic Sea coast and from there into Ukraine. Every region in Ukraine shows some Celtic influence in the styles of arms and jewellery production. Jewellery-making traditions of Ukraine also influenced other cultures. For example, the Goths came to the area sometime before 400 CE and adopted some of the techniques prevalent in Ukraine, including polychrome and animal-styles later reflected in the Merovingian style of jewellery.

Many Goths left the Black Sea region c. 370s CE under pressure from the Huns. These Asiatic people brought a somewhat different version of the polychrome style, which was characterized by color inlays in soldered partitions and the presence of background patterns of filigree and granulation. Also during this time, migration of other Asians (including Avars, Bulgars, Khazars, Ugrs and Pechenegs) influenced and were influenced by the culture of Ukraine.

== Traditional Ukrainian jewellery ==
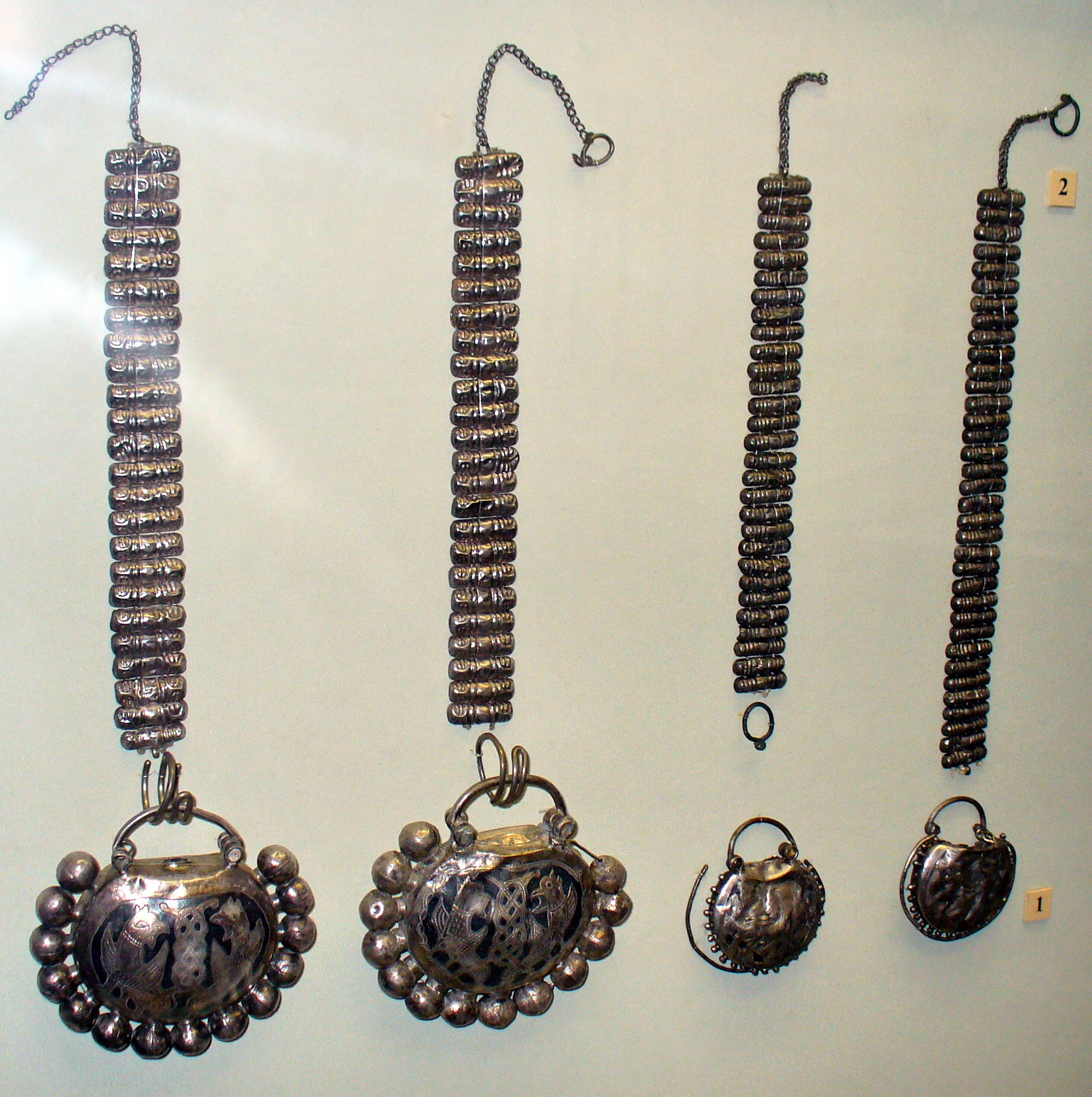
Kolts found in Nizovka, Chernihiv Oblast. 12th century

The early 6th century saw the spread of Slavic people, and the state of Kyivan Rus was founded in around 880 CE. Traditions of previous inhabitants did not vanish, and this was quite apparent in the jewellery. Alongside original autochthon forms, there is a mix of Scythian, Sarmatian, Hun, Greek, Celtic and Viking influence on Slavic jewellery. The techniques which were familiar to the ancient Slavs included forging, stamping, chasing, granulation, lost-wax casting enameling, and niello. Artisans reached a very high level of technical proficiency. The Benedictine monk Theophilus rated jewelers of Kyivan Rus second only after the Byzantines. Besides the pendants, rings, torques, armlets, fibulas, necklaces and other such jewellery, which had been common to all nations, Slavs had original jewellery – silver armlets of a distinctive Kyiv type, temple rings, enameled kolts and diadems. Slavic metal amulets such as spoons, hatchets, horses, ducks, zoomorphic and anthropomorphic sewed plates are also well known.

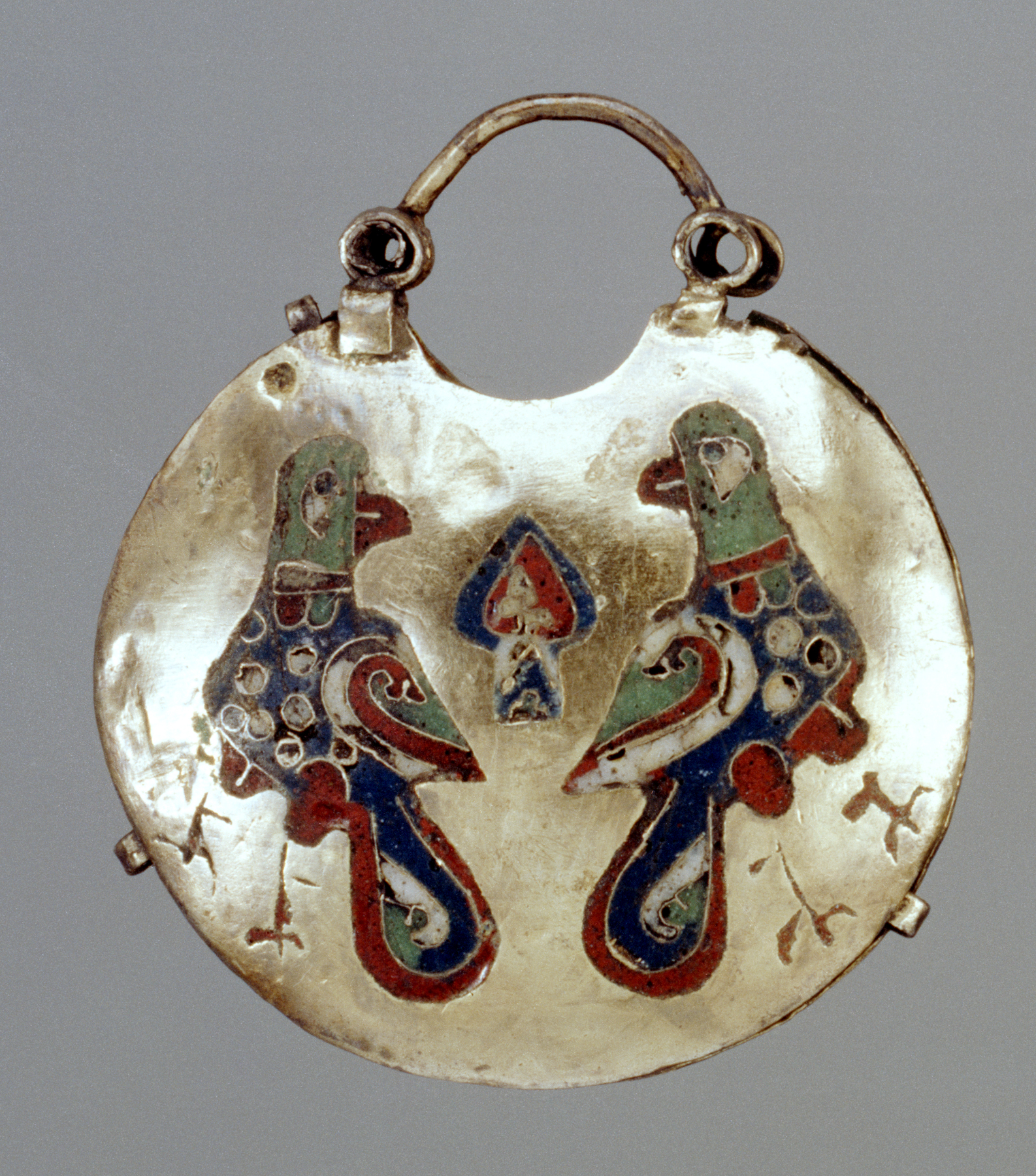
Ukrainian kolt

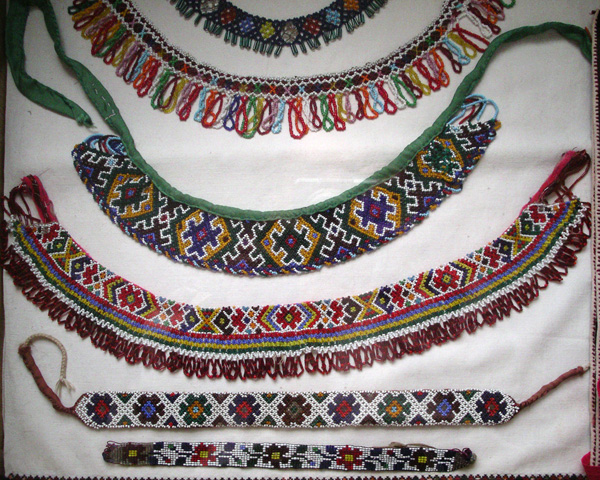
Ukrainian beadwork

Around this time, Ukraine also began to feel the influences of the Byzantine Empire, most notably in world view, culture and art. New types of creative works appeared, such as rich book settings, often embroidered with pearls (mainly from the Dnieper river), liturgical cups, crosses, icon setting frameworks, and later on boxes for storing relics, church chandeliers, cups, and plates. In 1240 the Mongol invasion of Rus led by Batu Khan completely destroyed Kyiv. The artisans of Rus' were made prisoners and forced to work for the Tatars. The Mongol occupation lasted for several centuries. Revived centres in Halych and Volodymyr tried to continue Kyivan traditions. Simultaneously, small colonies of north-eastern Slavs along the Volga River and its tributaries were borrowing some of the better Rus' handicraft traditions. In combination with local cultural traditions as well as under the influence of Baltic people they contributed to the new culture that would later be called Russian.

Traditional jewellery in Hutsul and Pokuttya regions includes beadwork and Ukrainian embroidery.

=== Amulets ===
In Slavic mythology amulets play a large role in keeping away evil spirits. During the eleventh and twelfth century, snake medallions were very popular. The medallion was round, oval or octagon in shape. On the outside, it had an image of one or more Christian saints, but on the inside facing toward the wearer and unseen by the public, it had an image of a snakelike Slavic female deity, possibly Melusine. This is an example of a "double faith" in the culture of ancient Rus.

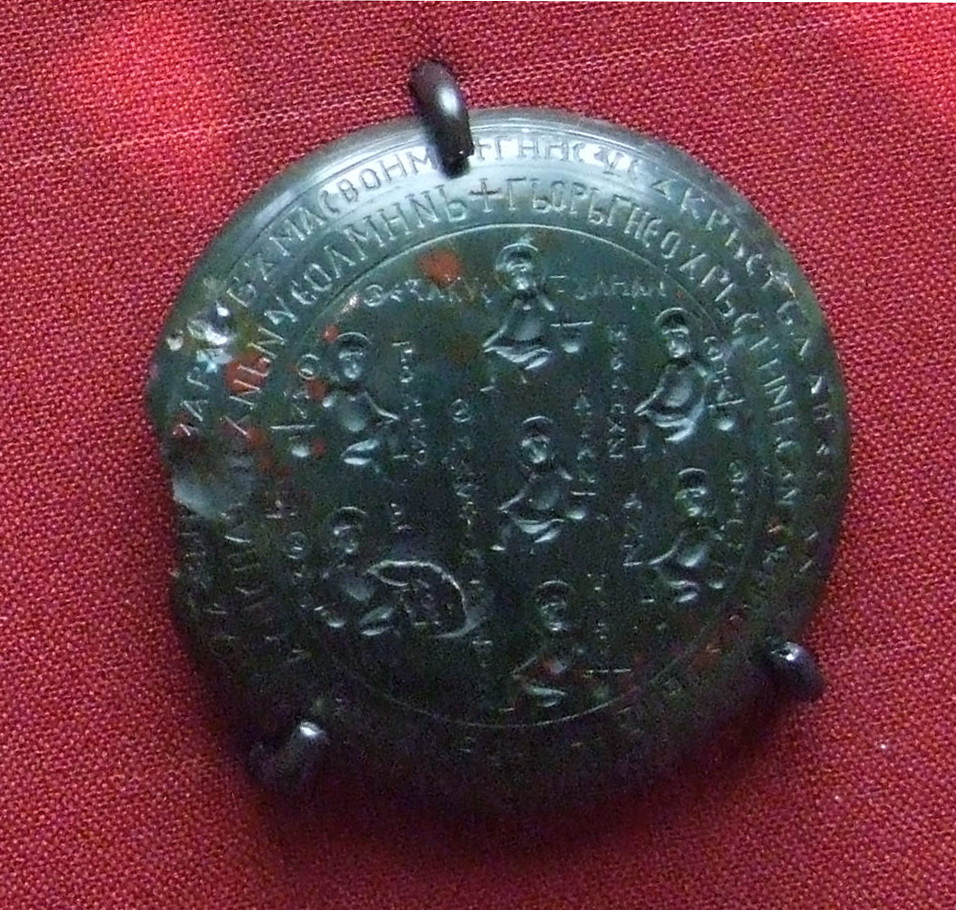
Amulet with saints on one side

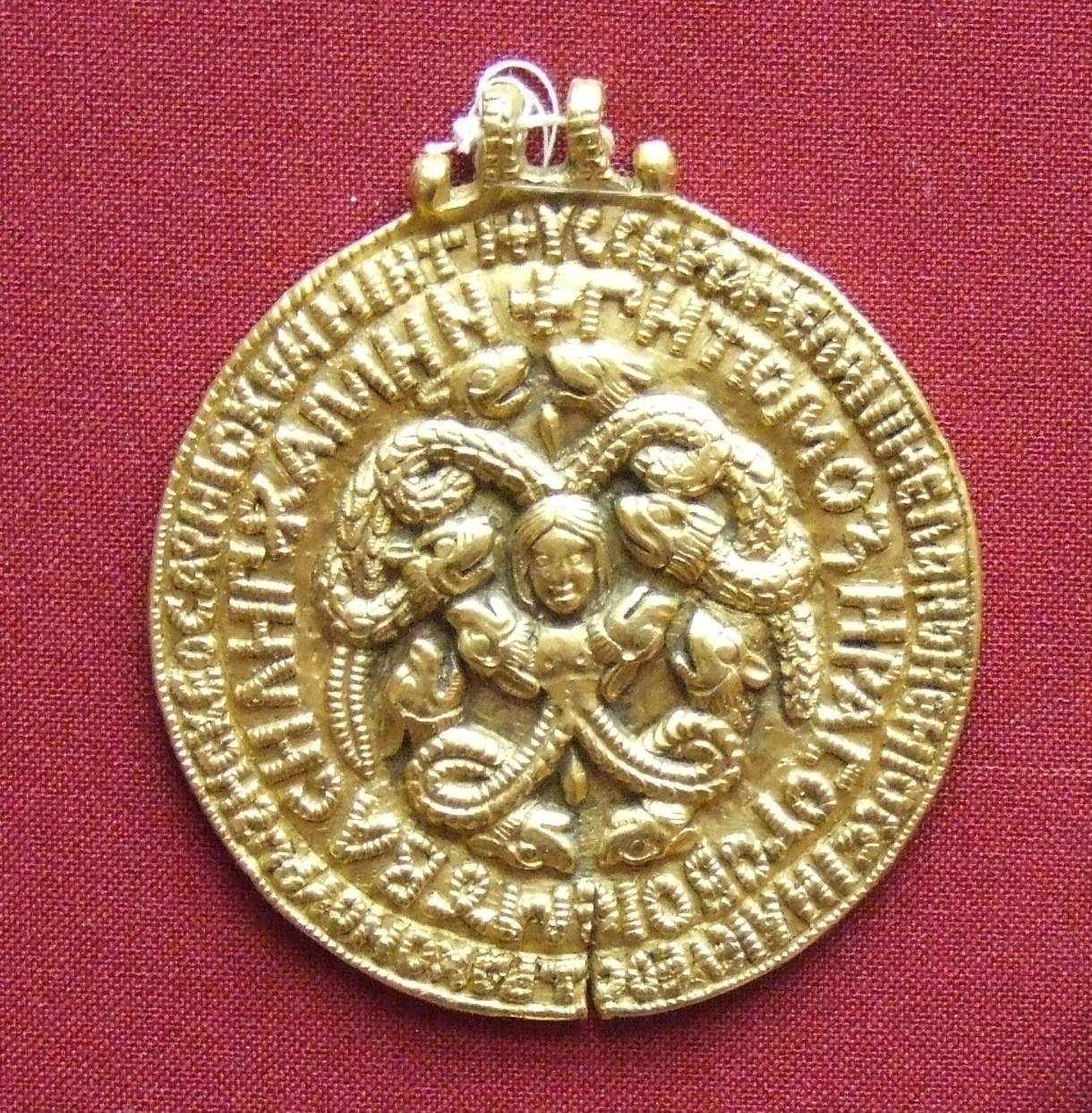
Chernihiv hryvnia

== The Renaissance period ==
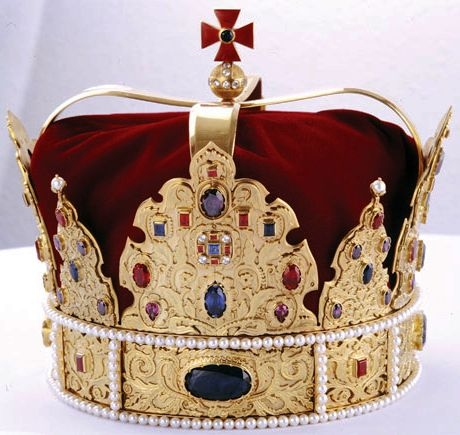
Crown of the Kingdom of Galicia–Volhynia

A further stage of development of jewellery art in Ukraine happened under the period of Polish-Lithuanian State rule and is characterized by the expansion of a new style of the Renaissance period. The most powerful centers of jewellery making at the time were Lviv, Kyiv, and Kamianets-Podilskyi. Lviv was the leading center for a substantial period of time. The main feature of Renaissance jewellery in Ukraine was technical sophistication using ancient decorative elements. Some of the most famous Ukrainian jewelers whom we know of today were Nykolay, Lavrentiy, Symon, A. Kasiyanovych, and H. Ostafiyevych. They worked hand in hand with Poles, Germans, Jews, Hungarians, Armenians, Italians and Scotsmen. The independent goldsmiths' guild in Lviv was founded more than four centuries ago. Jewellers of this period were involved both in the production of items for monasteries and churches, and the production of items for secular use such as dishes and jewellery. Silver belts were a specialty of the craftsmen of Lviv. They had characteristic silver or gilded engraved alternating oval and rectangular plates.

Cutting of diamonds and other gemstones was invented in the mid 14th century. This allowed for lighter settings that covered less of the stone. The arrival of the first imported cut diamonds therefore were of great interest to the merchants in Ukraine.

Ukrainian jewellery was also influenced in this period by works originating in Augsburg, Nierenberg, Turkey and Poland. Jewelers supplied the local market and filled orders from as far away as Moldova and Moscow. Ukrainian products were available in the foreign markets of Poland, at fairs in Ukraine, and elsewhere.

The techniques that were used in jewellery making continued to be perfected. Jewellery became smaller and lighter. Earrings were more often worn in pierced ears rather than at the temple or plaited into hair. The form of armlets changed, becoming light solid bands or chains made of gilded niello with diamonds or pearls. Pearls, buckles and decorative buttons became popular among men and women of all social classes.

== The Baroque period ==
Along with goldsmiths' guilds jewellers also worked in private workshops. The masterpieces of Baroque from the studios of I. Ravych, M. Yurjevych, P. Volokh, I. Zavadovskyi include a tsar gate made of solid pieces of silver, altar framework in Kyiv Pechersk Lavra and Saint Sophia Cathedral in Kyiv. This era also brought considerable interest in precious stones. Masters of diamond and gem faceting began appearing.

== Later periods ==
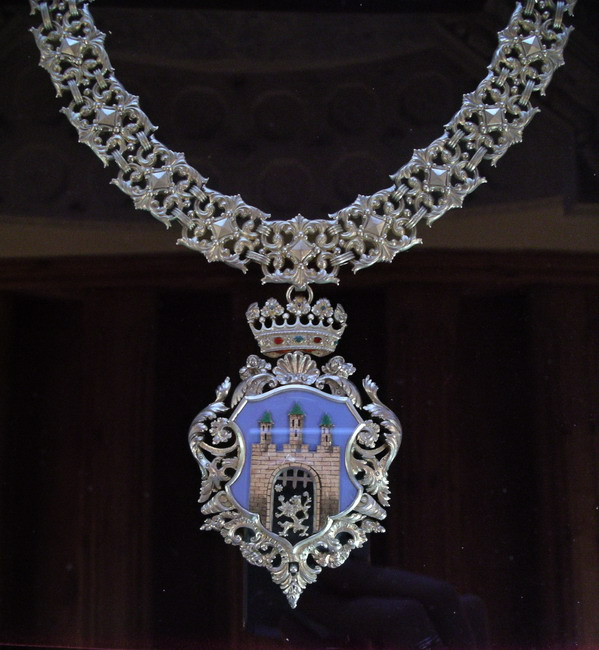
Photo of ceremonial chain created by Lviv jeweller Jan Jazyna in 1892. Silver, enamel, gilding. Currently at the Lviv History Museum.

In the countryside, the production of rural, non-professional jewellery became more common. It drew ideas from ancient heathen forms and patterns. At the turn of the 19th century master jewellers arose in the Carpathian Mountains, especially among the Hutsuls. Among them were brass masters Dudchak, Medvidchuk, and Fedyuk. In the eastern regions of Ukraine, dukach (stamped medallions or golden coins hanging on a chain) became common. In Western Ukraine a popular item was zgarda (a rope of silver coins in the form of necklace).

World War I and the Russian Civil War stopped any progress in the development of jewellery making in Ukraine.

== Soviet times ==
Under the Communist regime, Soviet goldsmiths largely copied old-fashioned patterns of the 19th century. Instead of expensive adornments intended for wealthy people, specimens made of relatively inexpensive materials with inlays of cheap stones and glass became the norm. This change was a result of a ruling of the Central Committee of the Communist Party of the USSR “Regarding the Elimination of Excessiveness in Design and Construction”. This set the task for artists – to find new forms and techniques with the use of allowed materials.

During the period of Socialism a long list of restrictions existed. The right to manufacture any wares of precious metals and stones was granted only to a monopoly of State enterprises. Small workshops were allowed to exist exclusively for repairing items. The “classic Soviet” design (berries, flowers, leaves) became characteristic of industrially produced patterns. Due to the shortage of specialized designers, flexibility in reacting to the needs of the consumer as well as innovation in jewellery design was greatly lacking.

For many years Ukraine was deprived of the opportunity to participate in the processes of contemporary artistic jewellery creation. There were many reasons for this, such as ideological prejudices of the Soviet regime, lack of contact with craftsmen in other countries, prohibition of individual artists to work with precious materials, and a lack of artistic education in many artists.

== Modern era ==
At present, no college or university in Ukraine offers study of the design of specifically Ukrainian jewellery. However, five secondary art-oriented institutions exist where students can study the technology and design of jewellery. In the Lviv Academy of Fine Arts, at the only faculty of metal working in Ukraine, one semester is devoted to the small forms. It is still impossible to work officially with precious materials in the workshops of the academy because of confusing and complicated legislation.

The absence of specialized galleries and artistic critics makes it difficult for individual artists to realize their works. The lack of regular exhibitions and competitions means that creative ideas are not being exchanged. A lack of tools and materials is present, even though the number of jewellery workshops during the post-Soviet period has increased almost tenfold. Legislation allows workshops to be opened by persons who are not professionally skilled. Copyright laws are not enforced. Goldsmiths in Ukraine are isolated from each other since there is no union or association. There are few contacts with colleagues from abroad, and there is still no professional literature in Ukrainian.

The first attempt to congregate jewellers from different regions of Ukraine was the 1997 exhibition "Treasures of Ukraine" in the newly created museum of the National Bank of Ukraine in Kyiv. In 1999, the "Jeweller-Expo" exhibition was held in Kyiv for the first time. In Ukraine, there are four state jewellery factories, two state factories of stone cutting, and one state enterprise of the mining and processing of amber. Only recently Ukraine began to extract its own gold.

Some small private companies have been founded in recent years. Also, some personal and group exhibitions of jewellery have taken place in Kyiv, Lviv and other cities. Ukrainian artists participate successfully in competitions and exhibitions abroad. Every year, many young artists are joining the search for new forms and innovative materials.

== See also ==
- Scythian art
- Celtic art
- Ukrainian Baroque
