= Colby (given name) =

- Gender: Unisex
- Language: Old Norse, Old English

Origin
- Meaning: Koli's town, Cola's town, coal town

Other names
- Alternative spelling: Colbie
- Related names: Cole, Colton, Coley

Colby is a gender-neutral given name, meaning "Koli's town", "Cola's town", or "coal town".

== Notable people with the given name "Colby" include ==
- Colby Armstrong (born 1982), Canadian ice hockey player
- Colby Barlow (born 2005), Canadian ice hockey player
- Colbie Bell (born 1971), American wrestler
- Colby Bishop (born 1996), English footballer
- Colby Bockwoldt (born 1981), American football player
- Colby Burnett, American game show contestant
- Colby Buzzell (born 1976), American soldier and journalist
- Colbie Caillat (born 1985), American singer-songwriter
- Colby Cameron (born 1990), American football player
- Colby Carthel (born 1976), American football coach
- Colby Cave (1994–2020), Canadian ice hockey player
- Colby Chandler (disambiguation), multiple people
- Colby Donovan (born 2006), Scottish footballer
- Colby Mitchell Chester (1844–1932), American admiral
- Colby Coash (born 1975), American politician
- Colby Cohen (born 1989), American ice hockey player
- Colby Corino (born 1996), Canadian-American professional wrestler
- Colby Covington (born 1988), American mixed martial artist
- Colby Donaldson (born 1974), American television personality
- Colby Fainga'a (born 1991), Australian rugby union footballer
- Colby French, American actor
- Colby Fulfer (born 1978), American politician
- Colby Genoway (born 1983), Canadian ice hockey player
- Colby Gossett (born 1995), American football player
- Colby Howard (born 2001), American stock car racing driver
- Colby Jones (born 2002), American basketball player
- Colby Keller (born 1980), American visual artist
- Colby Lewis (born 1979), American baseball player
- Colby Lopez (born 1986), American professional wrestler known as Seth Rollins
- Colby McKercher (born 2005), Australian Rules footballer
- Colby Miller (born 1980), American video jockey
- Colby Minifie (born 1992), American actress
- Colby O'Donis (born 1989), American singer-songwriter
- Colby Parkinson (born 1999), American football player
- Colby Pearce (born 1972), American cyclist
- Colby Pridham (born 1987), Canadian ice hockey player
- Colby Quiñones (born 2003), Puerto Rican footballer
- Colby Raha (born 1994), American motocross racer
- Colby Rasmus (born 1986), American baseball player
- Colby Robak (born 1990), Canadian ice hockey player
- Colby Schwartz (born 1974), American politician
- Colby Simmons (born 2003), American road cyclist
- Colby Slater (1896–1965), American rugby union footballer
- Colby Sorsdal (born 2000), American football player
- Colby Starck, American drummer
- Colby Stevenson (born 1997), American skier
- Colby Vokey (born 1965), American lawyer
- Colby Wadman (born 1995), American football player
- Colby Ward (born 1964), American baseball player
- Colby Wedgeworth (born 1985), American musician
- Colby James West (born 1985), American skier
- Colby Williams (born 1995), Canadian ice hockey player
- Colby Wooden (born 2000), American football player
- Colbie Young (born 2002), American football player

== Fictional characters ==
- Colby Granger, a character on the television series Numb3rs
- Colby Thorne, a character on the soap opera Home and Away

== See also ==
- Colton, given name
- Cole, given name
