= Kolton =

Kolton is both a given name and a Polish and Jewish surname. Notable people with the name include:

== Given name ==
- Kolton Browning (born 1990), American football player
- Kolton Ingram (born 1996), American baseball player
- Kolton Kohl (born 1998), American basketball player
- Kolton Lee, British film director
- Kolton Miller (born 1995), American football player

== Surname ==
- Adam Kolton (1968–2021), American environmentalist
- Chad Kolton, American public relations person
- Paul Kolton (1923–2010), American reporter
- Tamara Kolton (born 1970), American spiritual teacher

== See also ==
- Colton (given name)
- Kolten, given name
- Colton (surname)
