= Tanuja Randery =

- Born: 1966 (age 59–60); Kolkata, India
- Education: Boston University
- Occupation: Business executive
- Known for: Managing director of Amazon Web Services for EMEA
- Title: CBE (2025)
- Spouse: Mehul Randery
- Children: 1

Tanuja Randery is a London-based business executive. She is a specialist in commercial transformations. Since 2020, she has been VP and managing director of Amazon Web Services (AWS) UKI, Europe, Middle East and Africa (EMEA). She is the founder of the PowerWomen Network.

She was appointed a Commander of the Order of the British Empire (CBE) in the 2025 Birthday Honours, for "services to business and the technology sector".

In 2025, She was awarded the Commander of the Order of the British Empire (CBE).

== Early years ==
Tanuja Randery was born in Kolkata, India. She studied in Mumbai, then moved to the USA where she obtained an MBA from Boston University.

== Career ==
She met Neil Rackham and contributed to his research for the book Getting Partnering Right. Through Rackham, in 1995 she met McKinsey and after some time became a partner at McKinsey & Company. Seven years later, she moved to London invited by EMC to be head of strategy and transformation. Her next positions included: president for strategy and marketing for BT Global Services, CEO of UK & Ireland for Schneider Electric, CEO of UKI and Benelux for COLT, Independent Non Executive Director for Zensar Technologies, and others.

In 2017, she was included into the top-50 Champions for Women in Business by the Financial Times’ HERoes list.

In line with her strong advocacy of inclusion, diversity and equity in tech business, in November 2018 she founded PowerWomen Network for senior women business leaders.

In 2019, re-joined McKinsey in London from Apax Partners.

Since 2020, she has been VP and managing director of Amazon Web Services (AWS) UKI, Europe, Middle East and Africa (EMEA). In 2022, she was ranked number 6 on the UK Tech50 2022 list of most influential people in IT.

== Recognition ==
Randery was awarded a CBE (Commander of the Order of the British Empire) for services to business and the technology sector in the King's Birthday Honours in June 2025.

== Public roles ==
Randery served as non-executive director on the board of BusinessLDN (2019–2024), and Proximus Group as a trustee for Save the Children UK (2019–2021).

In March 2025, she was appointed trustee of the Natural History Museum by the prime minister of Great Britain.

== Private life ==
Randery is married to Mehul Randery, the couple have a son, Varun. She holds US and UK citizenships and resides in London.
