= Kolt (disambiguation) =

Kolt is a type of personal ornament used in mediaeval Rus.

Kolt or KOLT may also refer to:

- Kolt, Denmark, a suburb of the Danish city of Aarhus
- KOLT (AM), a radio station serving Terrytown, Nebraska, US
- KOLT-FM, a radio station serving Cheyenne, Wyoming, US
- KOLT (1320 AM), a defunct radio station serving Scottsbluff, Nebraska, US
- KPAW, a radio station serving F. E. Warren Air Force Base, Wyoming, US, as KOLT-FM 2007–2016

== See also ==
- Colt (disambiguation)
