= Kolten =

Kolten is a given name. Notable people with the name include:

- Kolten Solomon (born 1989), Canadian football player
- Kolten Wong (born 1990), American baseball player

== See also ==
- Colton, given name
- Colten, given name
- Kolton, given name and surname
