= Colton (given name) =

- Pronunciation: /ˈkoʊltən/ COL-ten
- Gender: Male

Origin
- Language: Old English
- Meaning: Cola's town, coal town

Other names
- Alternative spelling: Colten, Kolten, Kolton
- Related names: Colby, Cole, Colt

Colton is a male given name, and may refer to:

- Colton Avery (born 1991), American singer and songwriter
- Colton Beck (born 1990), Canadian ice hockey player
- Colton Brennan (1983–2021), American football player
- Colton Brown (born 1991), American judoka
- Colton Burpo (born 1999), American pastor and electrician
- Colton Collins (born 2004), American stock car racer
- Colton Cowser (born 2000), American baseball player
- Colton Dixon (born 1991), American singer
- Colton Dowell (born 1999), American football player
- Colton Dunn (born 1977), American comedian, actor, writer, and producer
- Colton Flasch (born 1991), Canadian curler
- Colton Ford (1962–2025), American singer and actor
- Colton Fretter (born 1982), Canadian ice hockey player
- Colton Gillies (born 1989), Canadian ice hockey player
- Colton Gordon (born 1998), American baseball pitcher
- Colton Greene (1833–1900), American general
- Colton Harris-Moore (born 1991), American fugitive
- Colton Haynes (born 1988), American model and actor
- Colton Herta (born 2000), American racing driver
- Colton Hood (born 2005), American football player
- Colton Hunchak (born 1997), Canadian football player
- Colton Iverson (born 1989), American basketball player
- Colton LeBlanc (born 1992), Canadian politician
- Colton Ledbetter (born 2001), American baseball player
- Colton Lott (born 1995), Canadian curler
- Colton McKivitz (born 1996), American football player
- Colton Moore (born 1993), American politician
- Colton Murray (born 1990), American baseball player
- Colton Orr (born 1982), Canadian ice hockey player
- Colton Parayko (born 1993), Canadian ice hockey player
- Colton Roche (born 1993), Irish rugby league footballer
- Colton Ryan (born 1995), American actor and singer
- Colton Sceviour (born 1989), Canadian ice hockey player
- Colton Schmidt (born 1990), American football player
- Colton Sissons (born 1993), Canadian ice hockey player
- Colton Smith (born 1987), American mixed martial artist
- Colton Storm (born 1994), American soccer player
- Colton Swan (born 1980), American football coach
- Colton Underwood (born 1992), American reality television personality
- Colton Yellow Horn (born 1987), Canadian ice hockey player
- Colton Welker (born 1997), American baseball player
- Colton White (born 1997), Canadian ice hockey player

== In fiction ==
- Colton Rivera, a DC Comics character in Gotham Academy (comic book)
- Colton Rogers, the father of Shaggy Rogers in the Scooby-Doo franchise

== See also ==
- Colten, given name
- Kolton, given name and surname
- Kolten, given name
- Colston, given name and surname
- Colson, given name and surname
- Colt, given name
