= Colt (given name) =

- Pronunciation: /ˈkoʊlt/
- Gender: Male
- Language: Old English

Other names
- Alternative spelling: Kolt

Colt is a masculine given name. It could also be a nickname for Colton.

== People with the name ==
- Colt Anderson (born 1985), American football coach and former player
- Colt Brennan (1983–2021), American football player
- Colt David (born 1985), American football player
- Colt Emerson (born 2005), American baseball player
- Colt Gray (born 2010), American criminal
- Colt Keith (born 2001), American baseball player
- Colt Knost (born 1985), American golfer
- Colt McCoy (born 1986), American football quarterback
- Colt Nichols (born 1994), motorcycle racer
- Colt Walker (gymnast) (born 2001), American artistic gymnast

== Fictional characters with the name ==
- Colt Reagan Bennet, in the 2016 Netflix series The Ranch
- Colt Fathom, a posthumous character in the cartoon Miraculous: Tales of Ladybug & Cat Noir
- Colt Grice, in the manga series Attack on Titan
- Colt Seavers, protagonist of the 1981 TV show The Fall Guy
- Colt Wilcox, in the 1987 animated TV series Saber Rider and the Star Sheriffs
- Colt (Hunter × Hunter), in the manga series Hunter × Hunter
- Colt, in the mobile video game Brawl Stars
- Colt Vahn, protagonist of the 2021 video game Deathloop

== See also ==
- Colt (disambiguation)
- Colt (surname)
