= Colt (surname) =

Colt is a surname.

== People with the name ==
- Colt baronets, a title in the Baronetage of England, including a list of baronets
- Alvin Colt (1916–2008), American costume designer
- Elizabeth Jarvis Colt (1826–1905), American businesswoman and philanthropist, widow and heir of Samuel Colt
- Ethel Barrymore Colt (1912–1977), American actress, producer, and singer
- Harry Colt (1869–1951), English golf-course architect
- Helen Colt (1882–1939), English gardening columnist & philanthropist
- James Colt (1932–2008), American lawyer and politician
- John C. Colt (1810–1842), American bookkeeping authority and murderer, brother of Samuel Colt
- Johnny Colt (born 1968), American bass guitarist
- Judah Colt (1761–1832), early settler of Erie County, Pennsylvania
- LeBaron B. Colt (1846–1924), US Senator from Rhode Island and judge
- Marshall Colt (born 1948), former actor and currently a practicing psychologist
- Maximilian Colt (died after 1641), Flemish sculptor who emigrated to England and became the King's Master Carver
- Roswell L. Colt (1779–1856), American businessman
- Samuel Colt (1814–1862), American inventor and industrialist, founder of Colt's Patent Fire-Arms Manufacturing Company
- Samuel P. Colt (1852–1921), American industrialist and politician, nephew of Samuel Colt

== Fictional characters with the name ==
- Christopher Colt, protagonist of the Colt .45 (TV series) TV series

== See also ==
- Colt (disambiguation)
- Colt (given name)
- Colt clan incest case, an Australian family engaging in generations of incest
