= Ryasna =

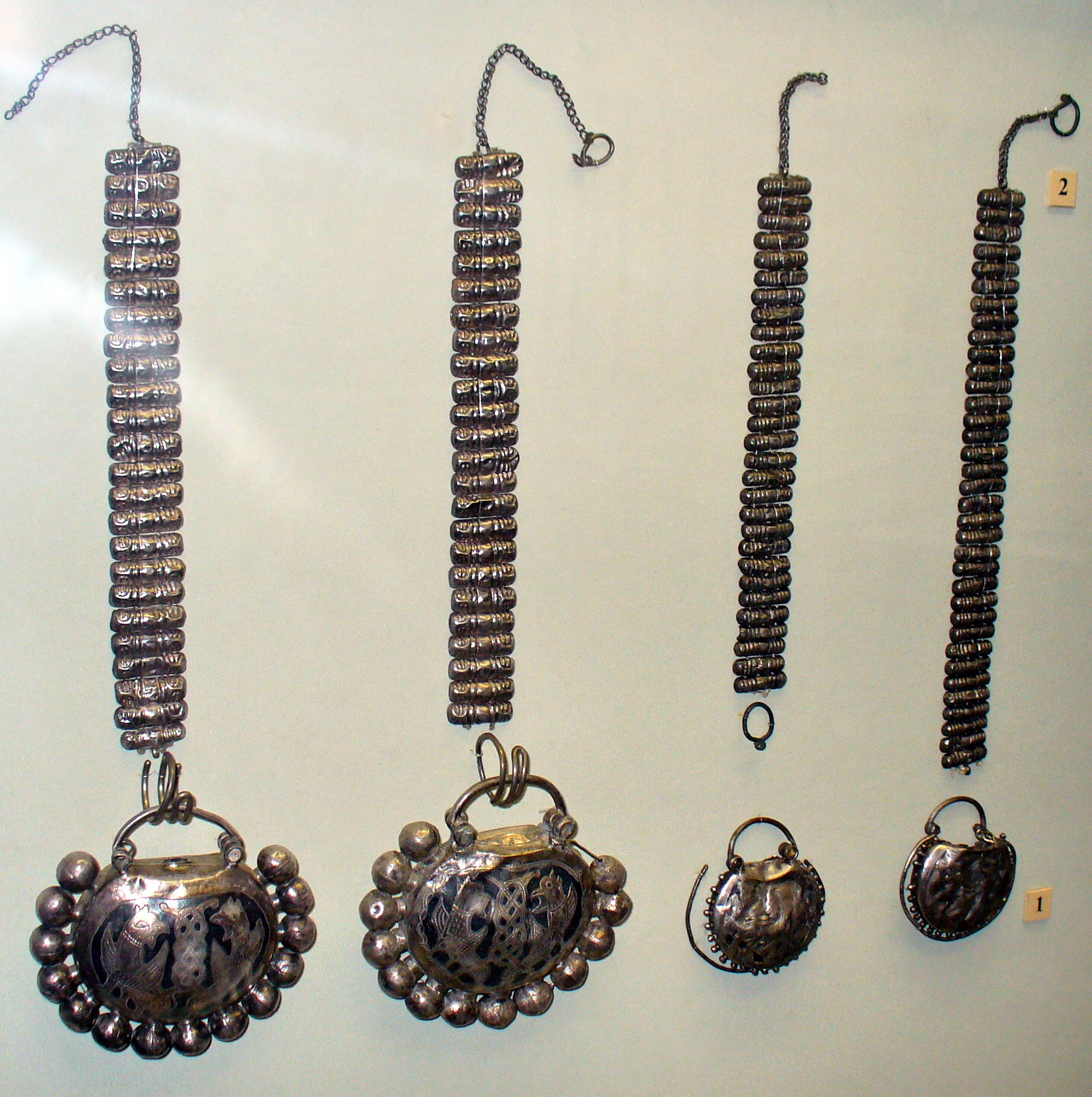
Kolts hanging on ryasnas found in Nizovka, Chernihiv Oblast. 12th century

Ryasna (Russian: рясна) was part of a Russian woman's headgear, hanging from a kokoshnik or as a temporal pendant.

It was a sign of family's prosperity common in the 11th–13th centuries in Kievan Rus', made in the shape of a chain linking golden, silver or copper pieces, medallions, used as a suspension for a kolt or a similar pendant.

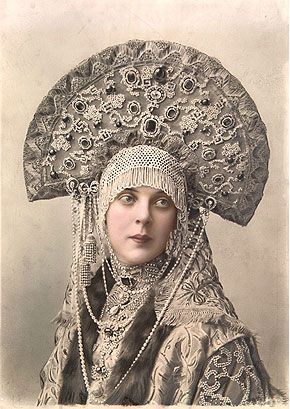
Ryasna pearls attached to a kokoshnik

== Design ==
Ryasnas were designed to hang down from each side of the headdress, reaching the woman's shoulders with the kolt reaching her chest. The design was in the form of a rain chain and the imagery portrayed always had the same theme: sky and fertile agriculture.

== See also ==
- Temple ring
