= 2019–20 Abilene Christian Wildcats men's basketball team =

American college basketball season

2019–20 Abilene Christian Wildcats men's basketball
- Conference: Southland Conference
- Record: 20–11 (15–5 Southland)
- Head coach: Joe Golding (9th season)
- Associate head coach: Brette Tanner
- Assistant coaches: Ted Crass; Antonio Bostic
- Home arena: Moody Coliseum

2019–20 Southland Conference men's basketball standings
	Conf.				Overall
Team	W		L	PCT	W		L	PCT
Stephen F. Austin	19	–	1	.950	28	–	3	.903
Abilene Christian	15	–	5	.750	20	–	11	.645
Nicholls	15	–	5	.750	21	–	10	.677
Sam Houston State	11	–	9	.550	18	–	13	.581
Northwestern State	11	–	9	.550	15	–	15	.500
Lamar	10	–	10	.500	17	–	15	.531
McNeese State	10	–	10	.500	15	–	17	.469
Texas A&M–CC	10	–	10	.500	14	–	18	.438
Central Arkansas	9	–	11	.450	10	–	21	.323
Incarnate Word	6	–	14	.300	9	–	22	.290
New Orleans	5	–	15	.250	9	–	21	.300
Southeastern Louisiana	5	–	15	.250	8	–	23	.258
Houston Baptist	4	–	16	.200	4	–	25	.138
Note: The 2020 SLC tournament was canceled after the first round due to the COVID-19 pandemic.

The 2019–20 Abilene Christian Wildcats men's basketball team represented Abilene Christian University in the 2019–20 NCAA Division I men's basketball season. The Wildcats, led by ninth-year head coach Joe Golding, played their home games at the Moody Coliseum in Abilene, Texas as members of the Southland Conference. They finished the season 20–11, 15–5 in Southland play to finish in a tie for second place. As the No. 2 seed, they received a double-bye to the semifinals of the Southland tournament, however, the tournament was cancelled amid the COVID-19 pandemic.

== Previous season ==
The Wildcats finished the 2018–19 season 27–7 overall, 14–4 in Southland play, to finish in second place. In the Southland tournament, they defeated Southeastern Louisiana in the semifinals, advancing to the championship game, where they defeated New Orleans, earning their first trip to the NCAA tournament in school history. They received the No. 15 seed in the Midwest Region, where they were matched up against No. 2 seeded Kentucky, ultimately losing 44–79.

== Roster ==
2019–20 Abilene Christian Wildcats men's basketball team
Players
Coaches

Pos.	#	Name	Height	Weight	Year	Hometown
G	1	Reggie Miller	6 ft 0 in (1.83 m)	150 lb (68 kg)	Jr	Houston, Texas
F	3	Airion Simmons	6 ft 5 in (1.96 m)	264 lb (120 kg)	Fr	Little Rock, Arkansas
G	4	Damien Daniels	5 ft 7 in (1.7 m)	140 lb (64 kg)	So	Kansas City, Missouri
G	5	Payten Ricks	6 ft 2 in (1.88 m)	190 lb (86 kg)	Sr	Wichita, Kansas
G	11	Tobias Cameron	6 ft 5 in (1.96 m)	210 lb (95 kg)	So	Gold Coast, Queensland, Australia
G	12	Mahki Morris	6 ft 3 in (1.91 m)	184 lb (83 kg)	Jr	Philadelphia, Pennsylvania
G	14	Trey Lenox	6 ft 3 in (1.91 m)	220 lb (100 kg)	Sr	Hot Springs, Arkansas
G	15	Immanuel Allen	6 ft 4 in (1.93 m)	215 lb (98 kg)	So	Lake Oswego, Oregon
G	20	Coryon Mason	6 ft 0 in (1.83 m)	190 lb (86 kg)	Jr	Oklahoma City, Oklahoma
F	23	Hayden Howell	6 ft 7 in (2.01 m)	225 lb (102 kg)	Sr	Midwest City, Oklahoma
F	32	Joe Pleasant	6 ft 8 in (2.03 m)	220 lb (100 kg)	So	Overland Park, Kansas
G	33	Paul Hiepler	6 ft 4 in (1.93 m)	170 lb (77 kg)	Jr	Camarillo, California
C	34	Kolton Kohl	7 ft 0 in (2.13 m)	240 lb (109 kg)	RS Jr	San Angelo, Texas
F	42	Clay Gayman	6 ft 6 in (1.98 m)	220 lb (100 kg)	So	Nevada, Missouri

Head coach

- Joe Golding (Abilene Christian)

Assistant coach(es)

- Brette Tanner (Emporia State)
- Ted Crass (Little Rock)
- Antonio Bostic (Stephen F. Austin)

Legend

- (C) Team captain
- (S) Suspended
- (I) Ineligible
- (W) Walk-on
- Injured
- Current redshirt

Roster
Last update: November 24, 2019

== Schedule and results ==
Date time, TV	Rank^{#}	Opponent^{#}	Result	Record	Site (attendance) city, state
Regular season
November 5, 2019*; 7:30 pm, ESPN3		Arlington Baptist	W 90–39	1–0	Moody Coliseum (1,439); Abilene, TX
November 9, 2019*; 1:00 pm, FloSports		at Drexel	L 83–86	1–1	Daskalakis Athletic Center (795); Philadelphia, PA
November 16, 2019*; 7:30 pm, ESPN3		Pepperdine	L 69–73	1–2	Moody Coliseum (2,553); Abilene, TX
November 18, 2019*; 9:00 pm		at UNLV; Southwestern Showdown	L 58–72	1–3	Thomas & Mack Center (6,906); Paradise, NV
November 21, 2019*; 11:00 am		Champion Christian; Southwestern Showdown	W 90–58	2–3	Moody Coliseum (1,937); Abilene, TX
November 25, 2019*; 7:00 pm, ESPN+		at Texas State; Southwestern Showdown	L 56–61	2–4	Strahan Arena (1,533); San Marcos, TX
November 29, 2019*; 7:00 pm, ESPN3		at SMU; Southwestern Showdown	L 51–70	2–5	Moody Coliseum (4,154); University Park, TX
December 5, 2019*; 7:30 pm, ESPN+		Southeast Missouri State	W 73–64	3–5	Moody Coliseum (1,982); Abilene, TX
December 7, 2019*; 7:00 pm, ESPN3		Dallas Christian	W 102–34	4–5	Moody Coliseum (1,270); Abilene, TX
December 12, 2019*; 6:00 pm		Howard Payne	W 105–36	5–5	Moody Coliseum (868); Abilene, TX
December 18, 2019; 7:00 pm		at New Orleans	W 77–71	6–5 (1–0)	Lakefront Arena (381); New Orleans, LA
December 21, 2019; 7:00 pm, ESPN+		Nicholls	W 79–61	7–5 (2–0)	Moody Coliseum (461); Abilene, TX
December 29, 2019*; 2:00 pm, ESPN3		at Wichita State	L 66–84	7–6	Charles Koch Arena (10,506); Wichita, KS
January 4, 2020; 4:30 pm, ESPN3		at Lamar	W 74–62	8–6 (3–0)	Montagne Center (1,936); Beaumont, TX
January 8, 2020; 7:00 pm, ESPN+		McNeese State	L 84–88	8–7 (3–1)	Moody Coliseum (815); Abilene, TX
January 11, 2020; 3:30 pm, ESPN3		Texas A&M–Corpus Christi	W 68–56	9–7 (4–1)	Moody Coliseum (1,011); Abilene, TX
January 18, 2020; 7:00 pm, ESPN+		Southeastern Louisiana	W 76–55	10–7 (5–1)	Moody Coliseum (1,683); Abilene, TX
January 22, 2020; 7:30 pm, ESPN+		at Sam Houston State	L 76–82 ^{OT}	10–8 (5–2)	Bernard Johnson Coliseum (1,197); Huntsville, TX
January 25, 2020; 3:00 pm		at Central Arkansas	W 70–69 ^{OT}	11–8 (6–2)	Farris Center (1,486); Conway, AR
January 29, 2020; 7:30 pm, ESPN+		at Stephen F. Austin	L 61–71	11–9 (6–3)	William R. Johnson Coliseum (4,341); Nacogdoches, TX
February 1, 2020; 7:00 pm, ESPN3		Incarnate Word	W 72–58	12–9 (7–3)	Moody Coliseum (1,192); Abilene, TX
February 5, 2020; 6:30 pm		at Northwestern State	L 69–73	12–10 (7–4)	Prather Coliseum (1,001); Natchitoches, LA
February 8, 2020; 7:00 pm, ESPN+		Lamar	W 84–49	13–10 (8–4)	Moody Coliseum (1,489); Abilene, TX
February 12, 2020; 7:30 pm, ESPN+		Houston Baptist	W 81–67	14–10 (9–4)	Moody Coliseum (1,124); Abilene, TX
February 15, 2020; 3:30 pm		at Texas A&M–Corpus Christi	W 78–64	15–10 (10–4)	American Bank Center (1,259); Corpus Christi, TX
February 19, 2020; 7:00 pm		at Houston Baptist	W 82–68	16–10 (11–4)	Sharp Gymnasium (590); Houston, TX
February 22, 2020; 4:00 pm		at Southeastern Louisiana	W 75–69	17–10 (12–4)	University Center (816); Hammond, LA
February 26, 2020; 7:30 pm, ESPN+		Sam Houston State	W 85–69	18–10 (13–4)	Moody Coliseum (1,439); Abilene, TX
February 29, 2020; 3:30 pm, ESPN+		Central Arkansas	W 75–70	19–10 (14–4)	Moody Coliseum (1,433); Abilene, TX
March 3, 2020; 7:30 pm, ESPN+		Stephen F. Austin	L 72–77	19–11 (14–5)	Moody Coliseum (2,893); Abilene, TX
March 7, 2020; 4:15 pm		at Incarnate Word	W 71–68 ^{OT}	20–11 (15–5)	McDermott Center (831); San Antonio, TX
Southland tournament
March 13, 2020; 7:00 pm, ESPN+	(2)	vs. Semifinals	Cancelled due to the COVID-19 pandemic		Merrell Center; Katy, TX
*Non-conference game. ^{#}Rankings from AP Poll. (#) Tournament seedings in parentheses. All times are in Central.

== See also ==
2019–20 Abilene Christian Wildcats women's basketball team
