= Colten =

Colten is a given name. Notable people with the name include:

== People ==
- Colten Boushie (1993–2016), Indigenous homicide victim
- Colten Brewer (born 1992), American baseball player
- Colten Ellis (born 2000), Canadian ice hockey player
- Colten Gunn (born 1991), American wrestler
- Colten Hayes (born 1990), Canadian ice hockey player
- Colten Teubert (born 1990), Canadian-German ice hockey player

== See also ==
- Colton (given name)
- Kolten
