= Colt International =

American aviation service company

Colt International (founded in 1999) is an aviation service company that specializes in contract jet fuel and international trip support. The corporate headquarters is in Webster (a suburb of Houston), Texas, United States with satellite offices based in Calgary, Canada, São Paulo, Brazil, and Geneva, Switzerland. The company started with 5 employees in 1999 and has grown to over 150 employees in 2011.

== Awards ==
Colt International was ranked as the #1 Best International Trip Planning company for 2012 based on survey data with questions about customer satisfaction, service quality, dependability and value in Professional Pilot magazine for its annual Preferences Regarding Aviation Services and Equipment (PRASE) award rankings.
