= 2020 Southland Conference men's basketball tournament =

- Classification: Division I
- Season: 2019–20
- Teams: 8
- Site: Merrell Center; Katy, Texas
- Champions: Tournament cancelled
- Television: ESPN+, ESPN2

2019–20 Southland Conference men's basketball standings
| | Conf. | | | | Overall |
| Team | W | | L | PCT | W | | L | PCT |
|---|---|---|---|---|---|---|---|---|
| Stephen F. Austin | 19 | – | 1 | .950 | 28 | – | 3 | .903 |
| Abilene Christian | 15 | – | 5 | .750 | 20 | – | 11 | .645 |
| Nicholls | 15 | – | 5 | .750 | 21 | – | 10 | .677 |
| Sam Houston State | 11 | – | 9 | .550 | 18 | – | 13 | .581 |
| Northwestern State | 11 | – | 9 | .550 | 15 | – | 15 | .500 |
| Lamar | 10 | – | 10 | .500 | 17 | – | 15 | .531 |
| McNeese State | 10 | – | 10 | .500 | 15 | – | 17 | .469 |
| Texas A&M–CC | 10 | – | 10 | .500 | 14 | – | 18 | .438 |
| Central Arkansas | 9 | – | 11 | .450 | 10 | – | 21 | .323 |
| Incarnate Word | 6 | – | 14 | .300 | 9 | – | 22 | .290 |
| New Orleans | 5 | – | 15 | .250 | 9 | – | 21 | .300 |
| Southeastern Louisiana | 5 | – | 15 | .250 | 8 | – | 23 | .258 |
| Houston Baptist | 4 | – | 16 | .200 | 4 | – | 25 | .138 |
Note: The 2020 SLC tournament was canceled after the first round due to the COVID-19 pandemic.

The 2020 Southland Conference men's basketball tournament is the postseason men's basketball tournament for the 2019–20 season in the Southland Conference. The tournament was scheduled from March 11–14, 2020. The first two games of the tournament were held at the Merrell Center in Katy, Texas on March 11, 2020. On March 12, the Southland Conference announced the remainder of the tournament would be canceled due to the COVID-19 pandemic. The tournament winner would have received an automatic invitation to the 2020 NCAA Division I men's basketball tournament, which was later cancelled for the same reason.

== Seeds ==
Teams were seeded by record within the conference, with a tie–breaker system to seed teams with identical conference records. Only the top eight teams in the conference qualified for the tournament. The top two seeds received double byes into the semifinals in the merit-based format. The No. 3 and No. 4 seeds received single byes to the quarterfinals.

| Seed | School | Conference | Tiebreaker 1 |
|---|---|---|---|
| 1 | Stephen F. Austin | 19–1 | |
| 2 | Abilene Christian | 15–5 | 1–0 vs Nicholls |
| 3 | Nicholls | 15–5 | 0–1 vs Abilene Christian |
| 4 | Sam Houston State | 11–9 | 1–0 vs Northwestern State |
| 5 | Northwestern State | 11–9 | 0–1 vs Sam Houston State |
| 6 | Lamar | 10–10 | LU is No. 6 seed by virtue of record against all other teams each played two times (LU 4-0 vs. HBU/UIW; MCN 3-1 vs. HBU/UIW; AMCC 3-1 vs. HBU/UIW) |
| 7 | McNeese State | 10–10 | MCN is No. 7 seed by virtue of record against all other teams each played two times (MCN 7-3 vs. HBU/UIW/LU/UNO/SLU; AMCC 6-4 vs. HBU/UIW/LU/UNO/SLU) Note: This contradicts the tie-breaker rules listed on the conference website, which indicates that after the three-team tie is broken, the first step of the two-team tiebreaker should apply, which would have then awarded the higher seed to Texas A&M-Corpus Christi based on its 1-0 record vs. McNeese State. |
| 8 | Texas A&M–CC | 10–10 | |

== Schedule ==
Tournament cancelled on March 12

| Session | Game | Time* | Matchup^{#} | Score | Television |
First round – Wednesday, March 11, 2020
| 1 | 1 | 5:00 pm | No. 5 Northwestern State vs. No. 8 Texas A&M–Corpus Christi | 79–62 | ESPN+ |
| 1 | 2 | 7:30 pm | No. 6 Lamar vs. No. 7 McNeese State | 80–59 | ESPN+ |
Second round – Thursday, March 12, 2020
| 2 | 3 | 5:00 pm | No. 4 Sam Houston State vs. No. 5 Northwestern State | – | ESPN+ |
| 2 | 4 | 7:30 pm | No. 3 Nicholls vs. No. 6 Lamar | – | ESPN+ |
Semifinals – Friday, March 13, 2020
| 3 | 5 | 5:00 pm | No. 1 Stephen F. Austin vs. Game 3 winner | – | ESPN+ |
| 3 | 6 | 7:30 pm | No. 2 Abilene Christian vs. Game 4 winner | – | ESPN+ |
Championship – Saturday, March 14, 2020
| 4 | 7 | 8:30 pm | Game 5 Winner vs. Game 6 winner | – | ESPN2 |
*Game times in CDT. #-Rankings denote tournament seeding.

== Bracket ==
Tournament cancelled on March 12.

First round Wednesday, March 11; ESPN+
5 | Northwestern State | 79
8 | Texas A&M–CC | 62
6 | Lamar | 80
7 | McNeese State | 59

Second round Thursday, March 12; ESPN+
4 | Sam Houston State
5 | Northwestern State
3 | Nicholls
6 | Lamar

Semifinals; Friday, March 13; ESPN+
1 | Stephen F. Austin
2 | Abilene Christian

Championship; Saturday, March 14; ESPN2

== See also ==
- 2020 Southland Conference women's basketball tournament
