= Professional Pilot =

- Art Director: Jose L Vasquez
- Categories: Aerospace
- Frequency: Monthly
- Publisher: Murray Smith
- Founded: 1967
- Company: Queensmith Communications Corp.
- Country: United States
- Based in: Alexandria, Virginia
- Language: English
- Website: propilotmag.com
- ISSN: 0191-6238

Professional Pilot (or ProPilot) is a monthly aerospace publication produced in the United States focusing on business aviation, including issues affecting pilots, managers and dispatchers. Editorial content includes pilot technique, airmanship, operations, weather, reader surveys, helicopters, airplanes and avionics.

== History and profile ==
ProPilot was started in 1967. The magazine is published monthly by Queensmith Communications Corporation and is headquartered in Alexandria, Virginia.

ProPilot is known in the business aviation industry for its annual PRASE (Preferences Regarding Aviation Services and Equipment) survey.
