= Kolton Kohl =

American basketball player (born 1998)

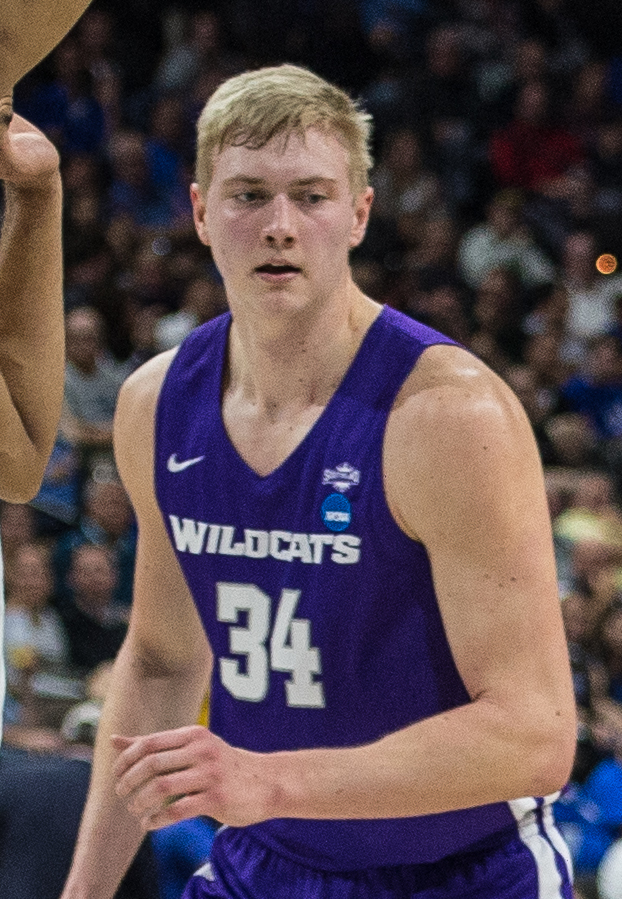
- Kohl with Abilene Christian in 2019

Personal information
- Born: May 6, 1998 (age 28)
- Listed height: 7 ft 0 in (2.13 m)
- Listed weight: 240 lb (109 kg)

Career information
- High school: Central (San Angelo, Texas)
- College: Abilene Christian (2017–2021)
- NBA draft: 2021: undrafted
- Position: Center

Career highlights
- First-team All-Southland (2021)

Kolton Alan Kohl (born May 6, 1998) is an American basketball player. He played college basketball for the Abilene Christian Wildcats.

== High school career ==
Kohl attended Central High School in San Angelo, Texas. He grew six inches (15 cm) in his final three years of high school. Kohl was a First Team All-District 3-6A selection and district Defensive MVP.

== College career ==
Prior to his first season at Abilene Christian, Kohl suffered a torn anterior cruciate ligament in his right knee during a summer workout. Following surgery, he developed a bacterial blood infection in his knee. He recovered after three months, losing about 20 pounds (9 kg) during that time, and was granted a redshirt. In his first two years, Kohl received limited playing time, before entering the starting lineup in his junior season. As a junior, he averaged 9.6 points and 4.3 rebounds per game. In his senior season, Kohl earned First Team All-Southland honors and led his team to a 2021 Southland tournament title, being named to the All-Tournament Team. In the first round of the 2021 NCAA tournament, he helped 14th-seeded Abilene Christian achieve a 53–52 win over third-seeded Texas.

== Career statistics ==
Legend
GP	Games played	GS	Games started	MPG	Minutes per game
FG%	Field goal percentage	3P%	3-point field goal percentage	FT%	Free throw percentage
RPG	Rebounds per game	APG	Assists per game	SPG	Steals per game
BPG	Blocks per game	PPG	Points per game	**Bold**	Career high

=== College ===
Year	Team	GP	GS	MPG	FG%	3P%	FT%	RPG	APG	SPG	BPG	PPG
2016–17	Abilene Christian	Redshirt										
2017–18	Abilene Christian	25	0	4.2	.417	–	.500	.9	.1	.0	.4	1.6
2018–19	Abilene Christian	**31**	5	4.6	.462	–	.657	1.6	.2	.2	.4	1.9
2019–20	Abilene Christian	**31**	20	17.9	.535	.000	**.717**	4.3	.8	**.5**	.8	9.6
2020–21	Abilene Christian	29	**29**	**18.7**	**.540**	**.267**	.716	**4.8**	**1.4**	.4	**.9**	**11.9**
Career		116	54	11.6	.524	.211	.693	3.0	.6	.3	.6	6.4
