= Colby Chandler =

Colby Chandler may refer to:

- Colby Chandler (CEO), former CEO of Eastman Kodak
- Colby Chandler (All My Children), a character on U.S. soap opera All My Children
