= Colt 45 =

Colt 45 may refer to:

== Firearms ==
- .45 ACP cartridge
- .45 Colt cartridge
- Colt Single Action Army, a revolver produced by Colt's Manufacturing Company
- M1911 pistol, a semi-automatic pistol produced by Colt's Manufacturing Company

== Arts, entertainment and media ==
- Colt .45 (1950 film), a Randolph Scott Western
- Colt 45 (2014 film), a French thriller
- Colt .45 (TV series), a Western television series
- "Colt 45" (song) or "2 Zig Zags", alternate names for "Crazy Rap", a 2000 single by Afroman
- Colts Drum and Bugle Corps, previously named the Colt .45 Drum and Bugle Corps

== Sports ==
- Colt 45 (basketball), a Philippine Basketball League team
- Colt 45, the finishing maneuver of professional wrestlers Colt Cabana and Colten Gunn
- Houston Colt .45s, a baseball team that was renamed the Houston Astros

== Other uses ==
- Colt 45 (malt liquor), an American alcoholic beverage brewed by the Pabst Brewing Company

== See also ==
- .45 caliber
