= Kolten Solomon =

Canadian football player (born 1989)

No. 71
- Position: Wide receiver

Personal information
- Born: July 16, 1989 (age 37); Regina, Saskatchewan, Canada
- Listed height: 5 ft 11 in (1.80 m)
- Listed weight: 190 lb (86 kg)

Career information
- CJFL: Regina Thunder
- University: Regina Rams
- CFL draft: 2011: undrafted

Career history
- 2011: Saskatchewan Roughriders*
- 2013: Saskatchewan Roughriders*
- * Offseason or practice squad member only
- Stats at CFL.ca

Kolten Solomon (born July 16, 1989) is a Canadian former professional football wide receiver. He attended the Saskatchewan Roughriders' 2011 training camp but, following an injury, he was released. After the completion of his junior career in 2011, Solomon signed with Saskatchewan on December 11, 2011. He was later released on May 11, 2012, and joined the Regina Rams of the CIS. He re-signed with the Roughriders on December 19, 2012. He played junior football for the Regina Thunder of the Canadian Junior Football League from 2009 to 2011.

On April 19, 2013, Solomon was released a second time by the Riders.
