= Temple ring =

Headwear ornament

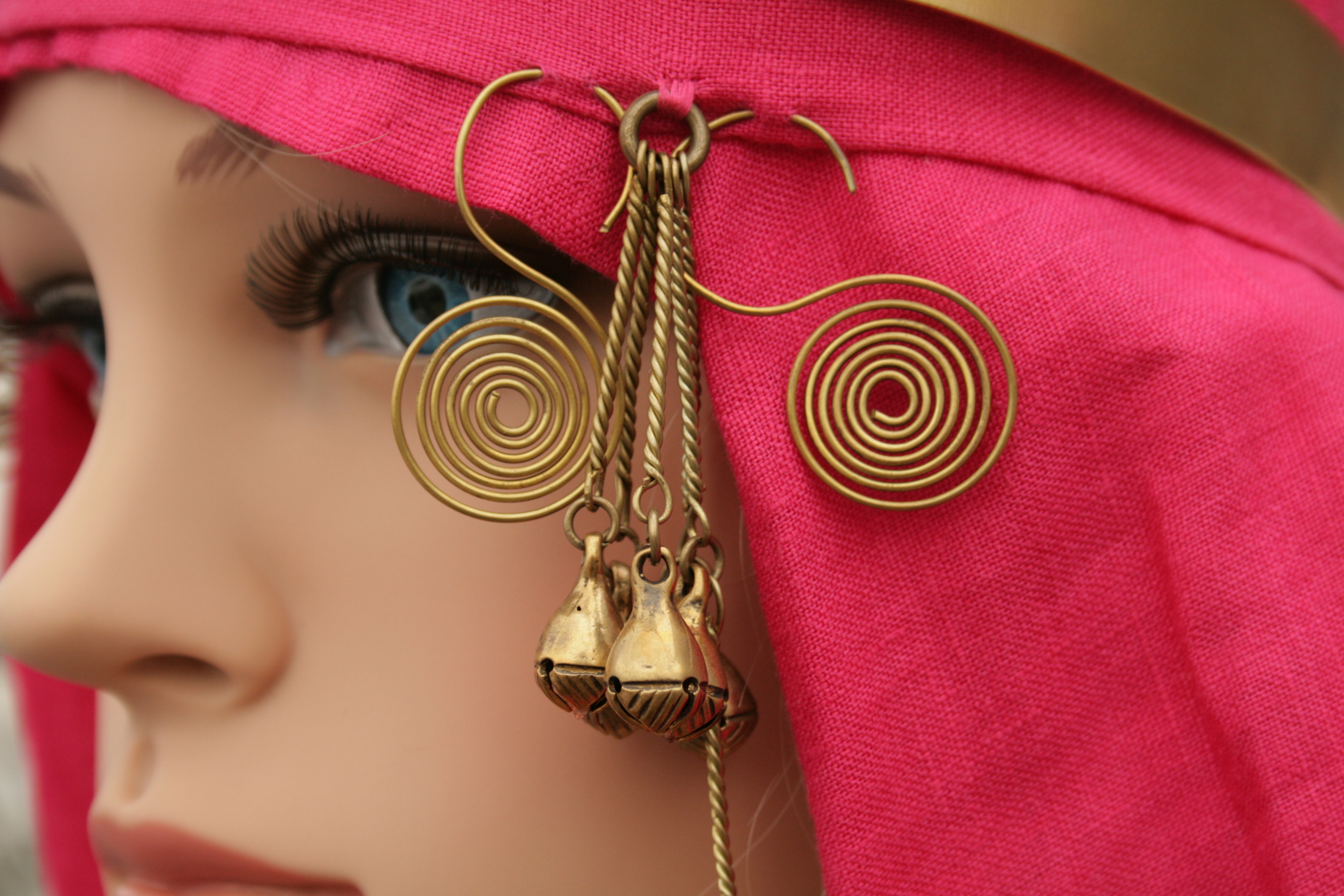
Reconstruction of Severian headdress with temple rings

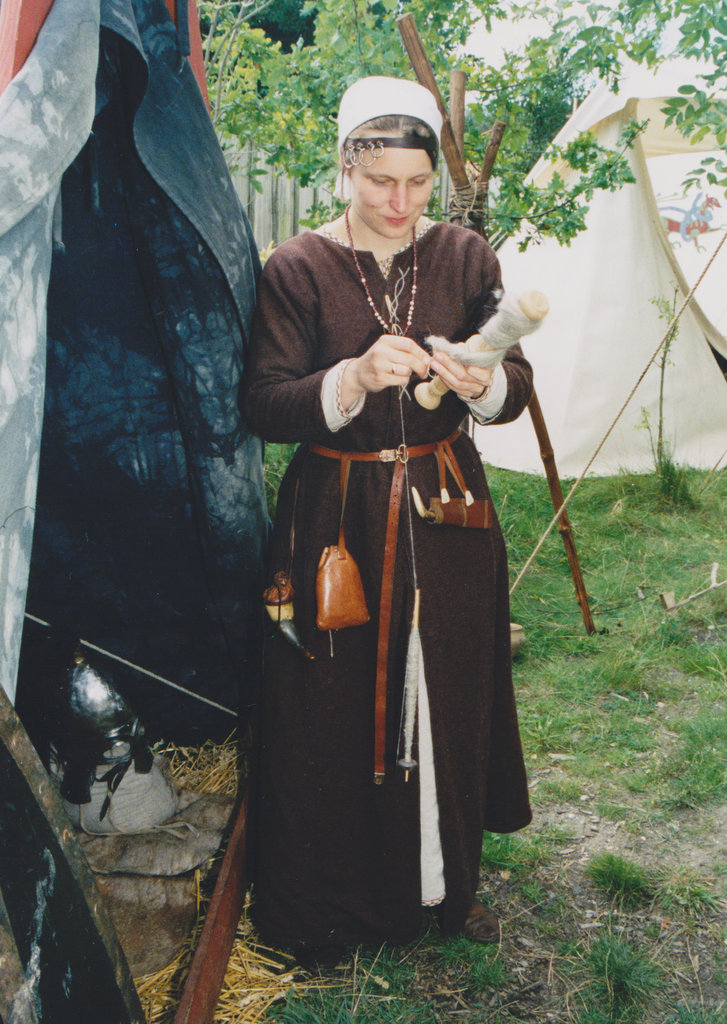
Woman in medieval Viking dress using a drop spindle and wearing multiple temple rings

A temple ring is an ornament that hangs from a headdress or in braids of hair in the front area at the side of the head – i.e. near a person's anatomical temple. Temple rings were part of Slavic, Scandinavian and others' medieval women's dress. Most were made of base metals such as copper alloys or iron, though silver and even gold were occasionally used. These were known as temple rings because they were worn on the head, near the temples of a woman or a girl.

== Slavic temple rings ==
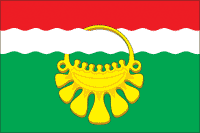
Flag of Rybolovsk in Ramensky District

Temple rings were characteristic decorations of Slavic women. Different tribes had their own designs and they were made out of various metals. The rings were attached to a string that became part of a headdress or they were woven directly into braids of hair. The earliest archeological evidence of temple rings was found in the Catacomb culture, Únětice culture and Karasuk culture. Later they were also found in the Chernoles culture. Temple rings were most popular between the 8th and 12th centuries, possibly influenced by the Arab and Byzantine cultures.

In later fashion styles, a temple ring was replaced by the kolt hanging from a ryasna.

Types of Slavic temple rings

| Type | Ethnic origin | Description | Region | Time period |
|---|---|---|---|---|
| Seven rays | Ramensk, Radimichs, Severians | | Kursk Oblast | 8th–12th centuries |
| Braceleted | Krivichs | Wire rings with a diameter of 5 to 10 cm, with the ends tied in a knot. Sometimes additional dandles or bangles were added to the ring. | Vitebsk Region Minsk Region Pskov Oblast, Kaluga Oblast, Nizhny Novgorod Oblast, Ryazan Oblast Smolensk Oblast | 5th–7th centuries |
| Shield | Ilmen Slavs | bronze rings with the shape of a lozenge either hammered into the ring or attached. | Gatchinsky District Novgorod Oblast. | |
| Seven blades | Vyatichi | | Moscow Oblast | |
| Spiral | Severians | | Kursk Oblast Poltava Oblast | |
| Three beads | Dregovichs | | Kyiv Oblast Chernihiv Oblast | |
