= Kolt =

Slavic female headgear

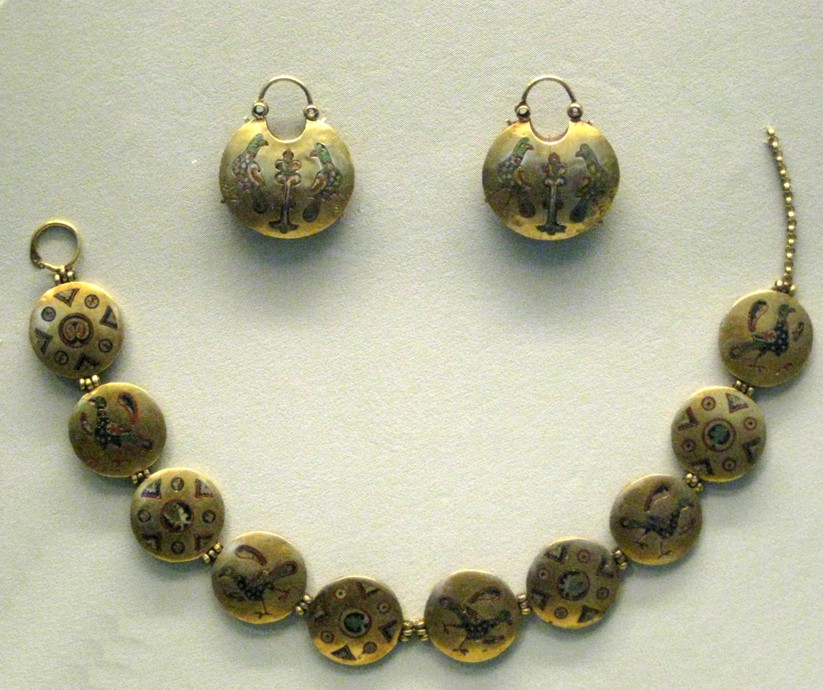
A pair of kolts featuring two birds flanking the tree of life and a ryasna, a chain of medallions, found in 1842 in or near the Church of the Tithes in Kiev). Cloisonné enamel on Gold. 12th century.

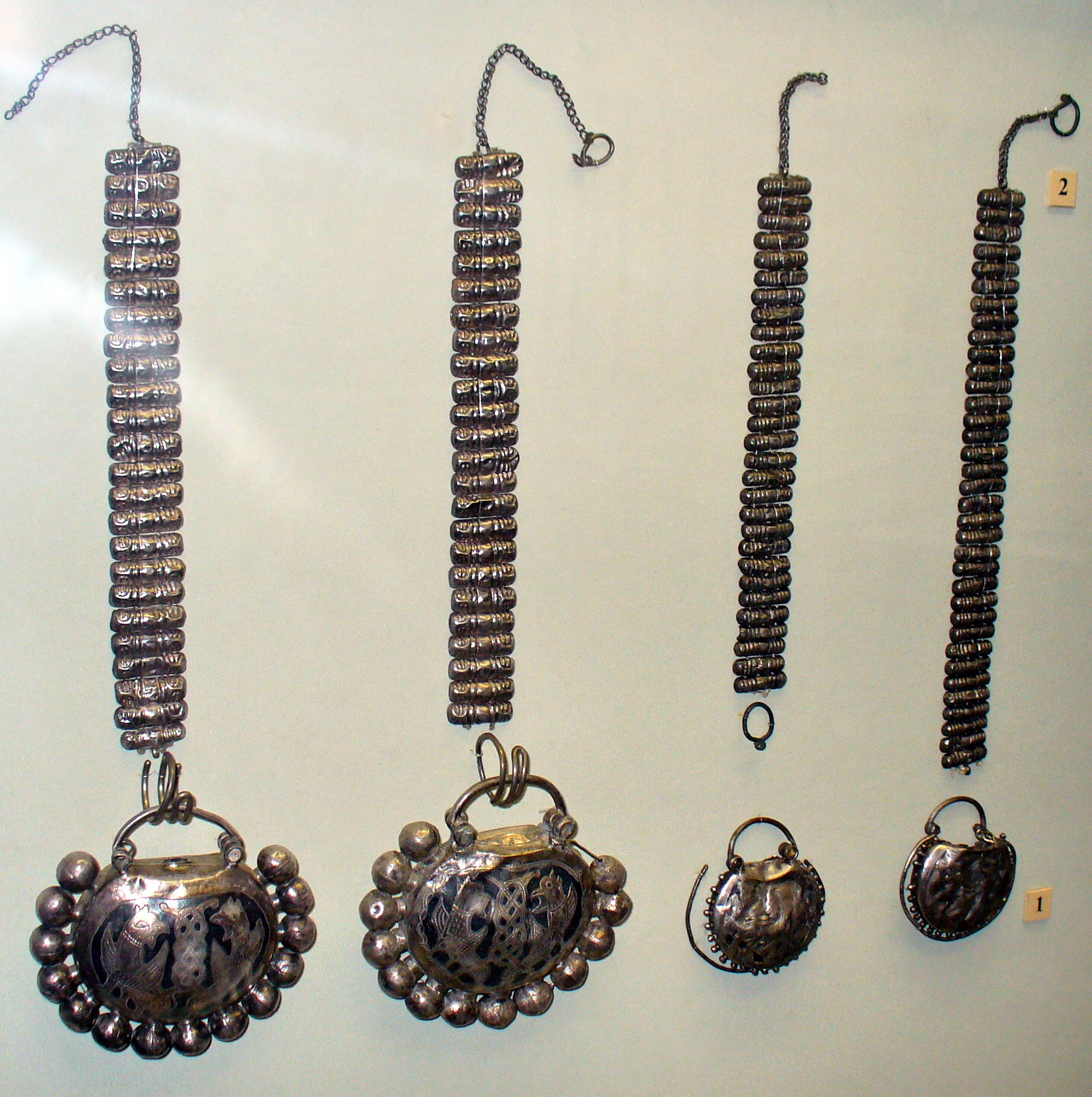
Kolts found in Nizovka, Chernihiv Oblast. 12th century.

Kolt or kolty was a part of a female headgear, hanging on a ryasna at both temples as a sign of the family's wealth, common in 11th-13th centuries in Old Rus'. It comprised a pair of metal pieces, joined to form a hollow medallion or star that, presumably, contained a piece of cloth, impregnated with fragrances.

== Origin ==
The origin of the word “kolt” is obscure. As a term, it was introduced in the late 19th century in the course of ethnographic surveys. According to a version it derived from the Ukrainian: ковтки, meaning 'earrings', also in West-Ukrainian dialects “колток”. In a Novgorod dialect the word “колтки” means pendants of earrings, it was also mentioned in birch bark document No. 644, found in Novgorod, dating back to Novgorod Republic.

== See also ==
Temple ring
