= 2021–22 Texas–Rio Grande Valley Vaqueros men's basketball team =

American college basketball season

2021–22 Texas–Rio Grande Valley Vaqueros men's basketball
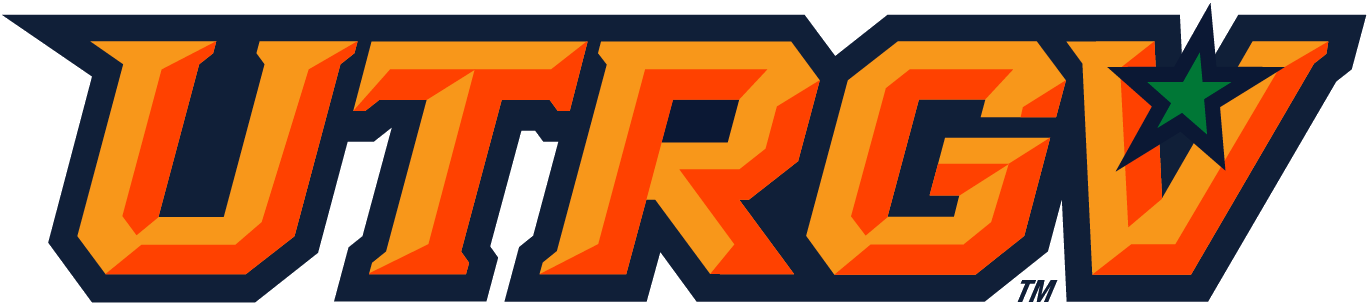
- Conference: Western Athletic Conference
- Record: 8–23 (3–15 WAC)
- Head coach: Matt Figger (1st season)
- Assistant coaches: Jovan Austin; Dean Cooper; Nikita Johnson
- Home arena: UTRGV Fieldhouse

2021–22 WAC men's basketball standings
	Conf.				Overall
Team	W		L	PCT	W		L	PCT
New Mexico State †	14	–	4	.778	27	–	7	.794
Seattle	14	–	4	.778	23	–	9	.719
Stephen F. Austin	14	–	4	.778	22	–	10	.688
Grand Canyon	13	–	5	.722	23	–	8	.742
Sam Houston State	13	–	5	.722	19	–	14	.576
Abilene Christian	11	–	7	.611	25	–	11	.694
Utah Valley	10	–	8	.556	20	–	12	.625
Tarleton State *	9	–	9	.500	14	–	17	.452
California Baptist *	7	–	11	.389	18	–	16	.529
Dixie State *	6	–	12	.333	13	–	17	.433
Texas–Rio Grande Valley	3	–	15	.167	8	–	23	.258
Chicago State	3	–	15	.167	7	–	25	.219
Lamar	0	–	18	.000	2	–	27	.069
† 2022 WAC tournament winner * ineligible for the 2022 NCAA tournament due to transition from NCAA Division II

The 2021–22 Texas–Rio Grande Valley Vaqueros men's basketball team represented the University of Texas Rio Grande Valley in the 2021–22 NCAA Division I men's basketball season as members of the Western Athletic Conference. The team was led by first-year head coach Matt Figger. With the exception of two games at Bert Ogden Arena, the Vaqueros played their home games at the UTRGV Fieldhouse. Both venues are in Edinburg, Texas.

== Previous season ==
The Vaqueros finished the 2020–21 season 9–10, 2–5 in WAC play to finish in a tie for seventh place. In the first round of the WAC tournament, they lost to New Mexico State.

On February 6, 2021, following a game against Texas Southern, head coach Lew Hill announced that he would be stepping away to focus on his health. Unfortunately, the next day, Hill would pass away due to COVID-19. Four days later, assistant coach Jai Steadman was named interim coach for the remainder of the season.

== Roster ==
2021–22 Texas–Rio Grande Valley Vaqueros men's basketball team
Players
Coaches

Pos.	#	Name	Height	Weight	Year	Hometown
G	0	Mike Adewunmi	6 ft 6 in (1.98 m)	205 lb (93 kg)	GS	Dallas, TX
G/F	1	Justin Johnson	6 ft 6 in (1.98 m)	185 lb (84 kg)	Jr	Fort Lauderdale, FL
G	2	Quinton Johnson II	6 ft 6 in (1.98 m)	205 lb (93 kg)	RS So	Oklahoma City, OK
G	5	Ricky "Doc" Nelson	6 ft 1 in (1.85 m)	170 lb (77 kg)	RS Jr	Houston, TX
G	10	BJ Simmons	6 ft 3 in (1.91 m)	195 lb (88 kg)	RS So	Cedar Hill, TX
F	11	Marek Nelson	6 ft 7 in (2.01 m)	200 lb (91 kg)	GS	Plano, TX
G	13	Xavier Johnson	5 ft 11 in (1.8 m)	160 lb (73 kg)	GS	Dallas, TX
F	15	Shavaul Butters	6 ft 8 in (2.03 m)	210 lb (95 kg)	Fr	Freeport, Bahamas
G	20	Isaiah Garcia	5 ft 10 in (1.78 m)	160 lb (73 kg)	So	Weslaco, TX
F	23	Donte Houston Jr.	6 ft 9 in (2.06 m)	215 lb (98 kg)	Fr	Garland, TX
F	24	Malik Lawrence-Anderson	6 ft 6 in (1.98 m)	215 lb (98 kg)	Jr	Kingston, Jamaica
F	30	RayQuan Taylor	6 ft 9 in (2.06 m)	195 lb (88 kg)	Fr	Montgomery, AL
G	32	LaQuan Butler	6 ft 0 in (1.83 m)	170 lb (77 kg)	Jr	Benton Harbor, MI
G	33	Lee Hatcher	6 ft 0 in (1.83 m)	205 lb (93 kg)	Fr	Liberal, KS

Head coach

- Matt Figger (Eastern Kentucky)

Assistant coach(es)

- Jovan Austin (East Texas A&M)
- Dean Cooper (Aquinas (MI))
- Nikita Johnson (West Georgia)

Legend

- (C) Team captain
- (S) Suspended
- (I) Ineligible
- (W) Walk-on
- Injured
- Current redshirt

Roster
Last update: February 10, 2022

== Schedule and results ==
Date time, TV	Rank^{#}	Opponent^{#}	Result	Record	Site (attendance) city, state
Exhibition
November 3, 2021*; 7:00 pm		UT Tyler	W 101–72	–	UTRGV Fieldhouse; Edinburg, TX
Non-conference regular season
November 9, 2021*; 7:00 pm, ESPN+		Texas A&M International	W 74–59	1–0	UTRGV Fieldhouse (1,711); Edinburg, TX
November 12, 2021*; 8:00 pm, P12N		at Arizona	L 50–104	1–1	McKale Center (11,862); Tucson, AZ
November 16, 2021*; 7:00 pm, ESPN+		Paul Quinn	W 85–68	2–1	UTRGV Fieldhouse (873); Edinburg, TX
November 20, 2021*; 7:00 pm, ESPN+		vs. Northern Arizona; UTRGV South Padre Island Battle on the Beach	L 87–89	2–2	South Padre Island Convention Centre (1,340); South Padre Island, TX
November 22, 2021*; 7:00 pm, ESPN+		at Northern Arizona	W 82–80	3–2	Rolle Activity Center (400); Flagstaff, AZ
November 23, 2021*; 7:00 pm, ESPN+		vs. Cal State Fullerton	W 72–67	4–2	Rolle Activity Center (84); Flagstaff, AZ
November 26, 2021*; 7:00 pm, BTN		at No. 14 Illinois	L 85–94	4–3	State Farm Center (12,782); Champaign, IL
December 1, 2021*; 7:00 pm, ESPN+		Texas A&M–Corpus Christi; South Texas Showdown	L 77–83	4–4	UTRGV Fieldhouse (1,681); Edinburg, TX
December 3, 2021*; 6:00 pm, LHN		at No. 7 Texas	L 58–88	4–5	Frank Erwin Center (10,865); Austin, TX
December 8, 2021*; 7:00 pm, ESPN+		at Texas A&M–Corpus Christi; South Texas Showdown	L 69–75	4–6	American Bank Center (1,349); Corpus Christi, TX
December 14, 2021*; 7:30 pm, ESPN+		Texas Southern	L 60–70	4–7	Bert Ogden Arena (1,189); Edinburg, TX
December 17, 2021*; 7:00 pm		at UTSA	W 68–50	5–7	Convocation Center (748); San Antonio, TX
December 21, 2021*; 7:00 pm, ESPN+		Southwestern Adventist	Canceled due to COVID-19 protocols		UTRGV Fieldhouse; Edinburg, TX
WAC conference season
January 3, 2022; 2:00 pm, ESPN+		at Sam Houston State	L 78–86	5–8 (0–1)	Bernard Johnson Coliseum (131); Huntsville, TX
January 6, 2022; 7:00 pm, ESPN+		Grand Canyon	L 70–84	5–9 (0–2)	UTRGV Fieldhouse (878); Edinburg, TX
January 8, 2022; 7:00 pm, ESPN+		New Mexico State	L 73–85	5–10 (0–3)	UTRGV Fieldhouse (846); Edinburg, TX
January 11, 2022; 6:30 pm, ESPN+		at Stephen F. Austin; Rescheduled from Dec. 30	L 75–86	5–11 (0–4)	William R. Johnson Coliseum (1,709); Nacogdoches, TX
January 13, 2022; 7:00 pm, ESPN+		Chicago State	W 85–63	6–11 (1–4)	UTRGV Fieldhouse (537); Edinburg, TX
January 20, 2022; 7:00 pm, ESPN+		at Utah Valley	L 56–66	6–12 (1–5)	UCCU Center (1,574); Orem, UT
January 22, 2022; 8:00 pm, ESPN+		at Dixie State	L 74–85	6–13 (1–6)	Burns Arena (1,560); St,. George, UT
January 26, 2022; 7:00 pm, ESPN+		Abilene Christian	L 85–87	6–14 (1–7)	UTRGV Fieldhouse (713); Edinburg, TX
January 29, 2022; 7:00 pm, ESPN+		Tarleton State	L 64–79	6–15 (1–8)	UTRGV Fieldhouse (1,453); Edinburg, TX
February 2, 2022; 7:00 pm, ESPN+		Lamar	W 93–79	7–15 (2–8)	UTRGV Fieldhouse (818); Edinburg, TX
February 5, 2022; 3:00 pm, ESPN+		at Abilene Christian	L 66–83	7–16 (2–9)	Teague Center (1,088); Abilene, TX
February 10, 2022; 9:00 pm, ESPN+		at Seattle	L 59–67	7–17 (2–10)	Climate Pledge Arena (2,488); Seattle, WA
February 12, 2022; 9:00 pm, ESPN+		at California Baptist	L 72–80	7–18 (2–11)	CBU Events Center (4,651); Riverside, CA
February 16, 2022; 7:00 pm, ESPN+		Seattle	L 62–102	7–19 (2–12)	UTRGV Fieldhouse (1,618); Edinburg, TX
February 19, 2022; 7:00 pm, ESPN+		Sam Houston State	L 61–67	7–20 (2–13)	Bert Ogden Arena (2,717); Edinburg, TX
February 24, 2022; 7:00 pm, ESPN+		at Tarleton State	L 62–75	7–21 (2–14)	Wisdom Gymnasium (1,074); Stephenville, TX
March 2, 2022; 7:00 pm, ESPN+		at Lamar	W 67–63	8–21 (3–14)	Montagne Center (2,122); Beaumont, TX
March 5, 2022; 7:00 pm, ESPN+		Stephen F. Austin	L 63–93	8–22 (3–15)	UTRGV Fieldhouse (974); Edinburg, TX
WAC tournament
March 8, 2022; 8:00 pm, ESPN+	(9)	vs. (8) California Baptist; First round	L 80–81	8–23	Orleans Arena (307); Paradise, NV
*Non-conference game. ^{#}Rankings from AP Poll. (#) Tournament seedings in parentheses. All times are in Central.

== See also ==
- 2021–22 Texas–Rio Grande Valley Vaqueros women's basketball team
