= 2021–22 Sam Houston State Bearkats men's basketball team =

American college basketball season

2021–22 Sam Houston State Bearkats men's basketball
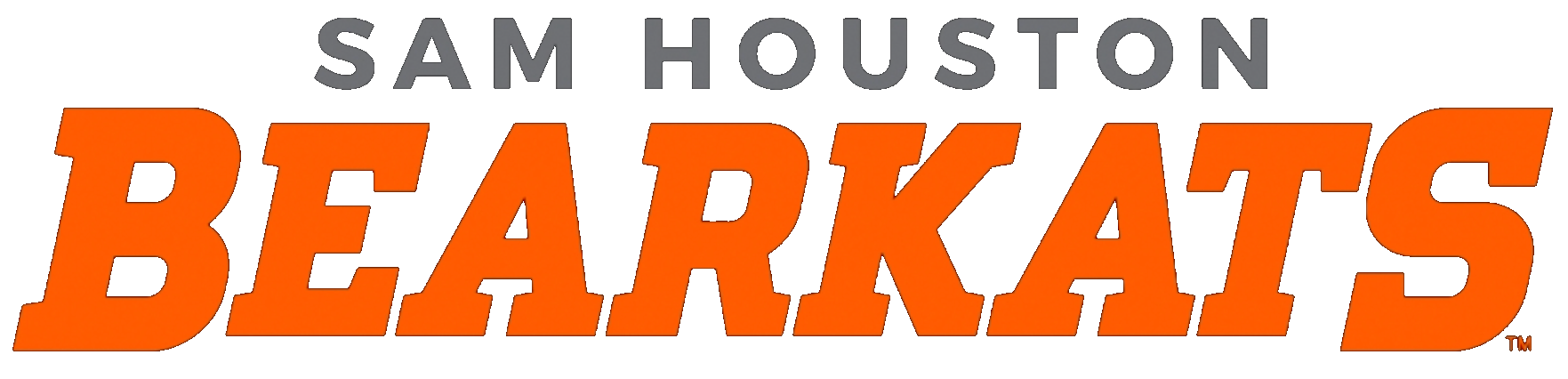
- Conference: Western Athletic Conference
- Record: 19–14 (13–5 WAC)
- Head coach: Jason Hooten (12th season)
- Associate head coach: Chris Mudge (1st as AHC; 12th overall season)
- Assistant coaches: Andre Owens (3rd season); Justin Bailey (1st season)
- Home arena: Bernard Johnson Coliseum

2021–22 WAC men's basketball standings
	Conf.				Overall
Team	W		L	PCT	W		L	PCT
New Mexico State †	14	–	4	.778	27	–	7	.794
Seattle	14	–	4	.778	23	–	9	.719
Stephen F. Austin	14	–	4	.778	22	–	10	.688
Grand Canyon	13	–	5	.722	23	–	8	.742
Sam Houston State	13	–	5	.722	19	–	14	.576
Abilene Christian	11	–	7	.611	25	–	11	.694
Utah Valley	10	–	8	.556	20	–	12	.625
Tarleton State *	9	–	9	.500	14	–	17	.452
California Baptist *	7	–	11	.389	18	–	16	.529
Dixie State *	6	–	12	.333	13	–	17	.433
Texas–Rio Grande Valley	3	–	15	.167	8	–	23	.258
Chicago State	3	–	15	.167	7	–	25	.219
Lamar	0	–	18	.000	2	–	27	.069
† 2022 WAC tournament winner * ineligible for the 2022 NCAA tournament due to transition from NCAA Division II

The 2021–22 Sam Houston State Bearkats men's basketball team represented Sam Houston State University in the 2021–22 NCAA Division I men's basketball season. They played their home games at the Bernard Johnson Coliseum in Huntsville, Texas and were led by 12th-year head coach Jason Hooten, as first-year members of the Western Athletic Conference.

== Previous season ==
The Bearkats finished the 2020–21 season 19–9, 13–3 in Southland Conference play to finish in third place. They were upset by Lamar in the quarterfinals of the Southland tournament. This season was the Bearkats' last as members of the Southland Conference, as they joined the Western Athletic Conference for the 2021–22 season.

== Roster ==
2021–22 Sam Houston State Bearkats men's basketball team
Players
Coaches

Pos.	#	Name	Height	Weight	Year	Hometown
G	0	Javon Grant	5 ft 11 in (1.8 m)	155 lb (70 kg)	Fr	Pittsburg, KS
G/F	1	Savion Flagg	6 ft 7 in (2.01 m)	225 lb (102 kg)	GS	Alvin, TX
G	2	Jarren Perry	6 ft 4 in (1.93 m)	205 lb (93 kg)	Fr	Carrollton, TX
G	3	Demarkus Lampley	6 ft 2 in (1.88 m)	175 lb (79 kg)	Sr	Phenix City, AL
G	10	Damon Nicholas Jr.	6 ft 4 in (1.93 m)	195 lb (88 kg)	Fr	Duncanville, TX
G	11	Javion May	6 ft 2 in (1.88 m)	190 lb (86 kg)	Jr	Chicago, IL
F	12	Tristan Ikpe	6 ft 6 in (1.98 m)	210 lb (95 kg)	Jr	Deer Park, TX
G	13	Jaden Ray	5 ft 10 in (1.78 m)	165 lb (75 kg)	Jr	Midwest City, OK
F	22	Kevin Martina	6 ft 7 in (2.01 m)	215 lb (98 kg)	Fr	Geneva, Switzerland
G	24	Donte Powers	6 ft 2 in (1.88 m)	170 lb (77 kg)	Jr	Starkville, MS
F/C	33	Giovanni Emejuru	6 ft 10 in (2.08 m)	270 lb (122 kg)	Fr	Loughborough, UK
F	40	Kian Scroggins	6 ft 7 in (2.01 m)	235 lb (107 kg)	Fr	Raymore, MO
C	54	Kuba Karwowski	7 ft 2 in (2.18 m)	235 lb (107 kg)	GS	Warsaw, Poland

Head coach

- Jason Hooten (Tarleton State)

Assistant coach(es)

- Chris Mudge (Texas)
- Andre Owens (Texas–San Antonio)
- Justin Bailey (UT Permian Basin)

Legend

- (C) Team captain
- (S) Suspended
- (I) Ineligible
- (W) Walk-on
- Injured
- Current redshirt

Roster
Last update: October 25, 2021

== Schedule and results ==
Date time, TV	Rank^{#}	Opponent^{#}	Result	Record	Site (attendance) city, state
Non-conference regular season
November 10, 2021*; 6:30 pm, ESPN+		LeTourneau	W 97–54	1–0	Bernard Johnson Coliseum (1,017); Huntsville, TX
November 12, 2021*; 7:30 p.m., BTN+		at Nebraska	L 65–74	1–1	Pinnacle Bank Arena (15,474); Lincoln, NE
November 17, 2021*; 7:30 pm, ESPN+		Missouri State	L 55–77	1–2	Bernard Johnson Coliseum (741); Huntsville, TX
November 21, 2021*; 1:30 pm		vs. Little Rock; Jacksonville Classic Jax semifinals	W 77–59	2–2	UNF Arena (745); Jacksonville, FL
November 22, 2021*; 1:30 pm		vs. Boston University; Jacksonville Classic Jax Championship	L 59–72	2–3	UNF Arena (330); Jacksonville, FL
November 24, 2021*; 7:00 pm, ESPN+		at SMU; Jacksonville Classic campus game	L 66–75	2–4	Moody Coliseum (3,198); University Park, TX
November 29, 2021*; 7:30 pm, LHN		at No. 7 Texas	L 57–73	2–5	Gregory Gymnasium (2,834); Austin, TX
December 2, 2021*; 6:30 pm, ESPN+		Schreiner	W 106–46	3–5	Bernard Johnson Coliseum (301); Huntsville, TX
December 11, 2021*; 3:00 pm		vs. UTSA	L 73–78	3–6	Toyota Center; Houston, TX
December 14, 2021*; 7:00 pm, ESPN+		at North Texas	L 55–65	3–7	The Super Pit (2,608); Denton, TX
December 18, 2021*; 2:00 pm, ESPN+		Hardin–Simmons	W 103–53	4–7	Bernard Johnson Coliseum (197); Huntsville, TX
December 21, 2021*; 6:00 pm		vs. Bradley; WestStar Sun Bowl Invitational	L 61–87	4–8	Don Haskins Center; El Paso, TX
December 22, 2021*; 5:00 pm		vs. North Carolina Central; WestStar Sun Bowl Invitational	W 68–51	5–8	Don Haskins Center; El Paso, TX
WAC regular season
December 30, 2021; 6:30 pm, ESPN+		Lamar	W 75–64	6–8 (1–0)	Bernard Johnson Coliseum (214); Huntsville, TX
January 3, 2022; 2:00 pm, ESPN+		Texas–Rio Grande Valley	W 86–78	7–8 (2–0)	Bernard Johnson Coliseum (131); Huntsville, TX
January 6, 2022; 7:00 pm, ESPN+		at Tarleton State	L 64–75	7–9 (2–1)	Wisdom Gym (1,627); Stephenville, TX
January 8, 2022; 6:00 pm, ESPN+		at Abilene Christian	W 65–63	8–9 (3–1)	Teague Center (1,098); Abilene, TX
January 13, 2022; 7:00 pm, ESPN+		at Lamar	W 73–56	9–9 (4–1)	Montagne Center (1,712); Beaumont, TX
January 15, 2022; 2:00 pm, ESPN+		Stephen F. Austin	W 49–41	10–9 (5–1)	Bernard Johnson Coliseum (1,114); Huntsville, TX
January 20, 2022; 6:30 pm, ESPN+		New Mexico State	W 71–46	11–9 (6–1)	Bernard Johnson Coliseum (491); Huntsville, TX
January 22, 2022; 2:00 pm, ESPN+		Grand Canyon	W 58–56	12–9 (7–1)	Bernard Johnson Coliseum (602); Huntsville, TX
January 26, 2022; 9:00 pm, ESPN+		at California Baptist	W 73–68	13–9 (8–1)	CBU Events Center (3,005); Riverside, CA
January 29, 2022; 3:00 pm, ESPN+		at Seattle	L 63–78	13–10 (8–2)	Redhawk Center (725); Seattle, WA
February 3, 2022; 6:30 pm, ESPN+		Dixie State	W 77–53	14–10 (9–2)	Bernard Johnson Coliseum (426); Huntsville, TX
February 5, 2022; 2:00 pm, ESPN+		Utah Valley	L 54–57	14–11 (9–3)	Bernard Johnson Coliseum (640); Huntsville, TX
February 12, 2022; 2:00 pm, ESPN+		at Chicago State	W 72–59	15–11 (10–3)	Jones Convocation Center (147); Chicago, IL
February 17, 2022; 6:30 pm, ESPN+		Abilene Christian	W 75–71 ^{OT}	16–11 (11–3)	Bernard Johnson Coliseum (382); Huntsville, TX
February 19, 2022; 7:00 pm, ESPN+		at Texas–Rio Grande Valley	W 67–61	17–11 (12–3)	Bert Ogden Arena (2,717); Edinburg, TX
February 24, 2022; 3:00 pm, ESPN+		at Stephen F. Austin	L 67–69	17–12 (12–4)	William R. Johnson Coliseum (2,353); Nacogdoches, TX
February 26, 2022; 6:00 pm, ESPN+		at Grand Canyon	L 41–67	17–13 (12–5)	GCU Arena (7,112); Phoenix, AZ
March 3, 2022; 6:30 pm, ESPN+		Tarleton State	W 69–50	18–13 (13–5)	Bernard Johnson Coliseum (1,319); Huntsville, TX
WAC tournament
March 9, 2022; 6:00 pm, ESPN+	(5)	vs. (8) Cal Baptist; Second round	W 65–35	19–13	Orleans Arena; Paradise, NV
March 10, 2022; 6:00 pm, ESPN+	(5)	vs. (4) Grand Canyon; Third round	L 66–69	19–14	Orleans Arena; Paradise, NV
*Non-conference game. ^{#}Rankings from AP Poll. (#) Tournament seedings in parentheses. All times are in Central.

== See also ==
2021–22 Sam Houston State Bearkats women's basketball team
