= 2021–22 Utah Valley Wolverines men's basketball team =

American college basketball season

2021–22 Utah Valley Wolverines men's basketball

SoCal Challenge Sand Division champions
- Conference: Western Athletic Conference
- Record: 20–12 (10–8 WAC)
- Head coach: Mark Madsen (3rd season)
- Associate head coach: Todd Phillips
- Assistant coaches: Todd Okeson; Jarred Jackson
- Home arena: UCCU Center (Capacity: 8,500)

2021–22 WAC men's basketball standings
	Conf.				Overall
Team	W		L	PCT	W		L	PCT
New Mexico State †	14	–	4	.778	27	–	7	.794
Seattle	14	–	4	.778	23	–	9	.719
Stephen F. Austin	14	–	4	.778	22	–	10	.688
Grand Canyon	13	–	5	.722	23	–	8	.742
Sam Houston State	13	–	5	.722	19	–	14	.576
Abilene Christian	11	–	7	.611	25	–	11	.694
Utah Valley	10	–	8	.556	20	–	12	.625
Tarleton State *	9	–	9	.500	14	–	17	.452
California Baptist *	7	–	11	.389	18	–	16	.529
Dixie State *	6	–	12	.333	13	–	17	.433
Texas–Rio Grande Valley	3	–	15	.167	8	–	23	.258
Chicago State	3	–	15	.167	7	–	25	.219
Lamar	0	–	18	.000	2	–	27	.069
† 2022 WAC tournament winner * ineligible for the 2022 NCAA tournament due to transition from NCAA Division II

The 2021–22 Utah Valley Wolverines men's basketball team represented Utah Valley University in the 2021–22 NCAA Division I men's basketball season. The Wolverines, led by third-year head coach Mark Madsen, played their home games at the UCCU Center in Orem, Utah, and competed as members of the Western Athletic Conference (WAC).

== Roster ==
2021–22 Utah Valley Wolverines men's basketball team
Players
Coaches

Pos.	#	Name	Height	Weight	Year	Previous school	Hometown
F	0	Asa McCord	6 ft 6 in (1.98 m)	210 lb (95 kg)	Jr	Salt Lake CC	Saratoga Springs, UT
G	1	Le'Tre Darthard	6 ft 4 in (1.93 m)	180 lb (82 kg)	So	McCook CC	Denton, TX
F	2	Tim Ceaser	6 ft 9 in (2.06 m)	210 lb (95 kg)	So	Coastal Carolina	Marion, AR
G	3	Blaze Nield	6 ft 1 in (1.85 m)	185 lb (84 kg)	Jr	BYU	Lehi, UT
G	4	Trey Woodbury	6 ft 4 in (1.93 m)	200 lb (91 kg)	Jr	UNLV	Las Vegas, NV
F/C	5	Tim Fuller	6 ft 9 in (2.06 m)	235 lb (107 kg)	So	Weber State	Gilbert, AZ
G	10	Jaden McClanahan	5 ft 10 in (1.78 m)	175 lb (79 kg)	So	Independence CC	Vallejo, CA
C	11	Fardaws Aimaq	6 ft 11 in (2.11 m)	245 lb (111 kg)	RS So	Mercer	Vancouver, BC
G	13	Colby Leifson	6 ft 4 in (1.93 m)	190 lb (86 kg)	So	BYU	Suwanee, GA
G	14	Claude McKesey	6 ft 0 in (1.83 m)	185 lb (84 kg)	Jr	Salt Lake CC	View Park, CA
G	15	Connor Harding	6 ft 6 in (1.98 m)	185 lb (84 kg)	Jr	BYU	Pocatello, ID
F	20	Brady Arbon	6 ft 5 in (1.96 m)	—	Fr	Grantsville HS	Grantsville, UT
F/C	21	Trey Farrer	6 ft 9 in (2.06 m)	235 lb (107 kg)	So	Snow College	St. George, UT
G	22	Jordan Battle	6 ft 2 in (1.88 m)	200 lb (91 kg)	Fr	Hargrave Military Academy	Chesapeake, VA
G	24	Justin Harmon	6 ft 4 in (1.93 m)	180 lb (82 kg)	Jr	Barton CC	Chicago, IL
G	35	Tyrel Phillips	6 ft 1 in (1.85 m)	205 lb (93 kg)	So	Rigby HS	Rigby, ID
F	45	Brock Anderson	6 ft 8 in (2.03 m)	230 lb (104 kg)	So	Bingham HS	Riverton, UT

Head coach

- Mark Madsen (Stanford)

Assistant coach(es)

- Todd Phillips (Lewis–Clark State)
- Todd Okeson (Nevada)
- Jarred Jackson (Liberty)

Legend

- (C) Team captain
- (S) Suspended
- (I) Ineligible
- (W) Walk-on
- Injured
- Current redshirt

Roster
Last update: December 14, 2021

== Schedule and results ==
Date time, TV	Rank^{#}	Opponent^{#}	Result	Record	High points	High rebounds	High assists	Site (attendance) city, state
Non-conference regular season
November 9, 2021*; 7:00 p.m., MW Network		at Boise State	L 56–76	0–1	15 – Aimaq	5 – tied	1 – tied	ExtraMile Arena (7,457); Boise, ID
November 12, 2021*; 6:00 p.m., ESPN+		Antelope Valley	W 82–48	1–1	25 – Aimaq	15 – Aimaq	9 – Nield	UCCU Center; Orem, UT
November 15, 2021*; 8:00 p.m., WCC Network		at Pepperdine; SoCal Challenge campus game	W 86–74	2–1	34 – Aimaq	14 – Aimaq	7 – Nield	Firestone Fieldhouse (435); Malibu, CA
November 17, 2021*; 8:00 p.m., ESPN+		at Long Beach State	W 84–78 ^{OT}	3–1	25 – Aimaq	16 – Aimaq	3 – tied	Walter Pyramid (1,126); Long Beach, CA
November 22, 2021*; 3:30 p.m., FloHoops		vs. Idaho; SoCal Challenge Sand Division semifinals	W 83–45	4–1	14 – tied	16 – Aimaq	5 – Nield	The Pavilion at JSerra (317); San Juan Capistrano, CA
November 24, 2021*; 3:30 p.m., FloHoops		vs. Nicholls; SoCal Challenge Sand Division championship	W 74–63	5–1	13 – tied	16 – Aimaq	5 – Nield	The Pavilion at JSerra (1,700); San Juan Capistrano, CA
November 27, 2021*; 3:00 p.m., ESPN+		Denver	W 77–68 ^{OT}	6–1	19 – Aimaq	14 – Aimaq	6 – Darthard	UCCU Center (1,386); Orem, UT
December 1, 2021*; 7:00 p.m., BYUtv/ESPN+		No. 12 BYU; UCCU Crosstown Clash	W 72–65 ^{OT}	7–1	24 – tied	22 – Aimaq	4 – Aimaq	UCCU Center (7,503); Orem, UT
December 3, 2021*; 6:00 p.m., ESPN+		Yellowstone Christian	Canceled					UCCU Center; Orem, UT
December 8, 2021*; 7:00 p.m., ESPN+		at Southern Utah	L 56–60	7–2	18 – Aimaq	10 – Aimaq	1 – tied	America First Event Center (2,053); Cedar City, UT
December 11, 2021*; 7:30 p.m., MW Network		at Wyoming	L 62–74	7–3	14 – Aimaq	7 – Ceaser	4 – tied	Arena-Auditorium (3,927); Laramie, WY
December 17, 2021*; 6:00 p.m., ESPN+		Bethesda	W 107–65	8–3	30 – Darthard	16 – Aimaq	9 – Nield	UCCU Center (1,363); Orem, UT
December 21, 2021*; 7:00 p.m., P12N		at Washington	W 68–52	9–3	16 – Darthard	15 – Aimaq	5 – Nield	Alaska Airlines Arena (5,618); Seattle, WA
WAC regular season
December 30, 2021; 6:00 p.m., ESPN+		Abilene Christian	L 76–80	9–4 (0–1)	27 – Nield	10 – Aimaq	11 – Nield	UCCU Center (1,472); Orem, UT
January 1, 2022; 2:00 p.m., ESPN+		Tarleton State	W 77–55	10–4 (1–1)	21 – Aimaq	16 – Aimaq	7 – Harding	UCCU Center (1,267); Orem, UT
January 8, 2022; 2:00 p.m., ESPN+		Dixie State	W 79–71	11–4 (2–1)	20 – Aimaq	17 – Aimaq	6 – Nield	UCCU Center (2,523); Orem, UT
January 12, 2022; 8:00 p.m., ESPN+		at Seattle	L 65–71	11–5 (2–2)	16 – Aimaq	15 – Ceaser	3 – tied	Climate Pledge Arena (1,260); Seattle, WA
January 15, 2022; 8:00 p.m., ESPN+		at Cal Baptist	L 73–75	11–6 (2–3)	27 – Aimaq	18 – Aimaq	4 – Aimaq	CBU Events Center (2,305); Riverside, CA
January 20, 2022; 6:00 p.m., ESPN+		UTRGV	W 66–56	12–6 (3–3)	13 – tied	14 – Aimaq	6 – Aimaq	UCCU Center (1,574); Orem, UT
January 22, 2022; 2:00 p.m., ESPN+		Lamar	W 58–41	13–6 (4–3)	15 – Aimaq	14 – Aimaq	3 – Harding	UCCU Center (1,511); Orem, UT
January 27, 2022; 6:00 p.m., ESPN+		at Chicago State	W 101–87	14–6 (5–3)	18 – Harding	5 – tied	4 – tied	Jones Convocation Center (250); Chicago, IL
February 3, 2022; 5:30 p.m., ESPN+		at Stephen F. Austin	L 59–78	14–7 (5–4)	12 – Aimaq	10 – Aimaq	4 – Nield	William R. Johnson Coliseum (0); Nacogdoches, TX
February 5, 2022; 1:00 p.m., ESPN+		at Sam Houston State	W 57–54	15–7 (6–4)	24 – Aimaq	10 – Aimaq	2 – tied	Bernard Johnson Coliseum (640); Huntsville, TX
February 10, 2022; 6:00 p.m., ESPN+		Grand Canyon	L 69–79	15–8 (6–5)	16 – Darthard	12 – Aimaq	6 – Harding	UCCU Center (3,724); Orem, UT
February 12, 2022; 2:00 p.m., ESPN+		New Mexico State	W 72–68	16–8 (7–5)	23 – Aimaq	12 – Aimaq	6 – Nield	UCCU Center (1,868); Orem, UT
February 16, 2022; 6:00 p.m., ESPN+		at Tarleton State	W 69–56	17–8 (8–5)	22 – Aimaq	20 – Aimaq	5 – Harding	Wisdom Gymnasium (3,017); Stephenville, TX
February 19, 2022; 7:00 p.m., ESPN+		at Dixie State	L 75–80 ^{OT}	17–9 (8–6)	23 – Harmon	21 – Aimaq	4 – Nield	Burns Arena (4,270); St. George, UT
February 24, 2022; 6:00 p.m., ESPN+		Seattle	W 67–52	18–9 (9–6)	19 – Aimaq	18 – Aimaq	7 – Harding	UCCU Center (2,547); Orem, UT
February 26, 2022; 2:00 p.m., ESPN+		Cal Baptist	W 63–54	19–9 (10–6)	20 – Aimaq	16 – Aimaq	5 – Harding	UCCU Center (2,187); Orem, UT
March 3, 2022; 7:00 p.m., ESPN+		at Grand Canyon	L 57–68	19–10 (10–7)	19 – Aimaq	19 – Aimaq	2 – tied	GCU Arena (6,950); Phoenix, AZ
March 5, 2022; 7:00 p.m., ESPN+		at New Mexico State	L 46–62	19–11 (10–8)	13 – Darthard	9 – Aimaq	4 – Nield	Pan American Center (5,707); Las Cruces, NM
WAC tournament
March 8, 2022; 6:00 p.m., ESPN+	(7)	vs. (10) Chicago State; First round	W 69–47	20–11	20 – Aimaq	7 – Harmon	6 – Nield	Orleans Arena (867); Paradise, NV
March 9, 2022; 8:30 p.m., ESPN+	(7)	vs. (6) Abilene Christian; Second round	L 74–82	20–12	20 – Aimaq	11 – Aimaq	3 – tied	Orleans Arena (1,136); Paradise, NV
*Non-conference game. ^{#}Rankings from AP poll. (#) Tournament seedings in parentheses. All times are in Mountain.

== See also ==
- 2021–22 Utah Valley Wolverines women's basketball team
