= 2021–22 Tarleton State Texans men's basketball team =

American college basketball season

2021–22 Tarleton State Texans men's basketball
- Conference: Western Athletic Conference
- Record: 14–17 (9–9 WAC)
- Head coach: Billy Gillispie (2nd season)
- Assistant coaches: Tra Arnold; Kyle Cooper; Joseph Jones
- Home arena: Wisdom Gym

2021–22 WAC men's basketball standings
	Conf.				Overall
Team	W		L	PCT	W		L	PCT
New Mexico State †	14	–	4	.778	27	–	7	.794
Seattle	14	–	4	.778	23	–	9	.719
Stephen F. Austin	14	–	4	.778	22	–	10	.688
Grand Canyon	13	–	5	.722	23	–	8	.742
Sam Houston State	13	–	5	.722	19	–	14	.576
Abilene Christian	11	–	7	.611	25	–	11	.694
Utah Valley	10	–	8	.556	20	–	12	.625
Tarleton State *	9	–	9	.500	14	–	17	.452
California Baptist *	7	–	11	.389	18	–	16	.529
Dixie State *	6	–	12	.333	13	–	17	.433
Texas–Rio Grande Valley	3	–	15	.167	8	–	23	.258
Chicago State	3	–	15	.167	7	–	25	.219
Lamar	0	–	18	.000	2	–	27	.069
† 2022 WAC tournament winner * ineligible for the 2022 NCAA tournament due to transition from NCAA Division II

The 2021–22 Tarleton State Texans men's basketball team represented Tarleton State University in the 2021–22 NCAA Division I men's basketball season. The Texans, led by second-year head coach Billy Gillispie, played their home games at the Wisdom Gym in Stephenville, Texas as members of the Western Athletic Conference (WAC).

The Texans finished the season 14–17, 9–9 in WAC play, to finish in eighth place. The season marked Tarleton State's second year of a four-year transition period from Division II to Division I. As a result, the Texans were not eligible to play in the NCAA tournament or the WAC tournament. However, they were eligible to play in the CIT or CBI.

== Previous season ==
In a season limited due to the ongoing COVID-19 pandemic, the Texans finished the 2020–21 season 10–10, 5–7 in WAC play, to finish in sixth place. They were not eligible for the WAC tournament.

== Roster ==
2021–22 Tarleton State Texans men's basketball team
Players
Coaches

Pos.	#	Name	Height	Weight	Year	Previous school	Hometown
G	1	Noah McDavid	6 ft 5 in (1.96 m)	—	Fr	Lake Highlands HS	Dallas, TX
G/F	2	Freddy Hicks	6 ft 6 in (1.98 m)	210 lb (95 kg)	So	Searcy HS	Searcy, AR
G	3	Shamir Bogues	6 ft 4 in (1.93 m)	190 lb (86 kg)	So	Killeen Ellison HS	Killeen, TX
G	4	Tahj Small	6 ft 5 in (1.96 m)	195 lb (88 kg)	Sr	Troy	Durham, NC
G	10	Jahlen Jack	6 ft 4 in (1.93 m)	—	Jr	Cerritos College	Atlanta, GA
G	11	Montre Gipson	5 ft 11 in (1.8 m)	200 lb (91 kg)	Sr	Ranger College	DeSoto, TX
F	12	Kylon Owens	6 ft 9 in (2.06 m)	—	So	Blinn College	Dallas, TX
G	13	Shakur Daniel	6 ft 6 in (1.98 m)	185 lb (84 kg)	Sr	Ranger College	Toronto, ON
G	14	Javontae Hopkins	6 ft 0 in (1.83 m)	165 lb (75 kg)	Jr	Fort Bend Travis HS	Houston, TX
G	20	Luke Winslow	6 ft 2 in (1.88 m)	—	Fr	Christian Heritage Academy	Oklahoma City, OK
G	21	Stefan Bryant	6 ft 4 in (1.93 m)	—	Sr	McNeil HS	Round Rock, TX
G/F	22	Garrett Levesque	6 ft 6 in (1.98 m)	—	Fr	Vermont Academy	El Paso, TX
G	24	Jaheim Holden	5 ft 10 in (1.78 m)	—	Jr	Barton CC	Chicago, IL
F	25	Bryce Brown	6 ft 8 in (2.03 m)	—	Jr	South Georgia State College	Atlanta, GA
G/F	55	Jayshawn Moore	6 ft 6 in (1.98 m)	—	Fr	Combine Academy	Detroit, MI

Head coach

- Billy Gillispie (Texas State)

Assistant coach(es)

- Tra Arnold (Biola)
- Kyle Cooper (Waldorf)
- Joseph Jones (Texas A&M)

Legend

- (C) Team captain
- (S) Suspended
- (I) Ineligible
- (W) Walk-on
- Injured
- Current redshirt

Roster
Last update: May 5, 2025

== Schedule and results ==
Date time, TV	Rank^{#}	Opponent^{#}	Result	Record	Site (attendance) city, state
Exhibition
November 1, 2021*; 7:00 p.m., ESPN+		Central Christian (KS)	W 73–50	–	Wisdom Gym (729); Stephenville, TX
Non-conference regular season
November 9, 2021*; 9:00 p.m., P12N		at Stanford	L 50–62	0–1	Maples Pavilion (3,080); Stanford, CA
November 12, 2021*; 7:00 p.m., ESPN+		at No. 3 Kansas	L 62–88	0–2	Allen Fieldhouse (16,300); Lawrence, KS
November 16, 2021*; 7:00 p.m., ESPN+		at Wichita State; Roman Main Event on-campus game	L 51–65	0–3	Charles Koch Arena; Wichita, KS
November 19, 2021*; 7:00 p.m., ESPN+		Paul Quinn	W 69–42	1–3	Wisdom Gym (838); Stephenville, TX
November 22, 2021*; 7:00 p.m., ESPN+		at North Dakota State; Roman Main Event on-campus game	L 53–54	1–4	Scheels Center (1,673); Fargo, ND
November 24, 2021*; 8:00 p.m., BTN		at No. 20 Michigan; Roman Main Event on-campus game	L 54–65	1–5	Crisler Center (12,336); Ann Arbor, MI
November 29, 2021*; 9:00 p.m., ESPN+		at No. 3 Gonzaga	L 55–64	1–6	McCarthey Athletic Center (6,000); Spokane, WA
December 5, 2021*; 7:00 p.m., ESPN+		Charleston Southern	L 57–59	1–7	Wisdom Gym (2,112); Stephenville, TX
December 7, 2021*; 7:00 p.m., ESPN+		Dallas Christian	W 84–65	2–7	Wisdom Gym (712); Stephenville, TX
December 8, 2021*; 7:00 p.m., ESPN+		Southwestern Assemblies of God	W 81–75	3–7	Wisdom Gym (848); Stephenville, TX
December 14, 2021*; 7:00 p.m., ESPN+		at South Alabama	L 62–69	3–8	Mitchell Center (1,607); Mobile, AL
December 17, 2021*; 7:00 p.m., ESPN+		South Alabama	W 65–52	4–8	Wisdom Gym (802); Stephenville, TX
December 21, 2021*; 7:00 p.m., ESPN+		Air Force	W 67–45	5–8	Wisdom Gym (1,423); Stephenville, TX
WAC conference season
December 30, 2021; 8:00 p.m., ESPN+		at Dixie State	W 83–69	6–8 (1–0)	Burns Arena (967); St. George, UT
January 1, 2022; 3:00 p.m., ESPN+		at Utah Valley	L 55–77	6–9 (1–1)	UCCU Center (1,267); Orem, UT
January 6, 2022; 7:00 p.m., ESPN+		Sam Houston State	W 75–64	7–9 (2–1)	Wisdom Gym (1,627); Stephenville, TX
January 8, 2022; 7:00 p.m., ESPN+		Stephen F. Austin	W 77–71 ^{OT}	8–9 (3–1)	Wisdom Gym (2,022); Stephenville, TX
January 13, 2022; 8:00 p.m., ESPN+		at New Mexico State	L 57–73	8–10 (3–2)	Pan American Center (5,131); Las Cruces, NM
January 15, 2022; 7:00 p.m., ESPNU		at Grand Canyon	L 59–80	8–11 (3–3)	GCU Arena (7,499); Phoenix, AZ
January 20, 2022; 7:00 p.m., ESPN+		California Baptist	L 84–88	8–12 (3–4)	Wisdom Gym (1,899); Stephenville, TX
January 22, 2022; 7:00 p.m., ESPN+		Seattle	L 68–76	8–13 (3–5)	Wisdom Gym (2,022); Stephenville, TX
January 26, 2022; 7:00 p.m., ESPN+		at Lamar	W 62–57	9–13 (4–5)	Montagne Center (2,116); Beaumont, TX
January 29, 2022; 7:00 p.m., ESPN+		at Texas–Rio Grande Valley	W 79–64	10–13 (5–5)	UTRGV Fieldhouse (1,453); Edinburg, TX
February 5, 2022; 7:00 p.m., ESPN+		Chicago State	W 57–54	11–13 (6–5)	Wisdom Gym (2,223); Stephenville, TX
February 12, 2022; 7:00 p.m., ESPN+		Abilene Christian	L 63–77	11–14 (6–6)	Wisdom Gym (2,884); Stephenville, TX
February 16, 2022; 7:00 p.m., ESPN+		Utah Valley	L 56–69	11–15 (6–7)	Wisdom Gym (3,017); Stephenville, TX
February 19, 2022; 2:00 p.m., ESPN+		at Chicago State	W 79–60	12–15 (7–7)	Jones Convocation Center (128); Chicago, IL
February 24, 2022; 7:00 p.m., ESPN+		Texas–Rio Grande Valley	W 75–62	13–15 (8–7)	Wisdom Gym (1,074); Stephenville, TX
February 26, 2022; 7:00 p.m., ESPN+		Lamar	W 57–49	14–15 (9–7)	Wisdom Gym (1,763); Stephenville, TX
March 3, 2022; 6:30 p.m., ESPN+		at Sam Houston State	L 50–69	14–16 (9–8)	Bernard Johnson Coliseum (1,319); Huntsville, TX
March 5, 2022; 6:00 p.m., ESPN+		at Abilene Christian	L 56–61	14–17 (9–9)	Teague Center (1,213); Abilene, TX
*Non-conference game. ^{#}Rankings from AP poll. (#) Tournament seedings in parentheses. All times are in Central.

== See also ==
- 2021–22 Tarleton State Texans women's basketball team
