= 2021–22 New Mexico State Aggies men's basketball team =

American college basketball season

2021–22 New Mexico State Aggies men's basketball

WAC regular season co-champions WAC tournament champions

NCAA tournament, Second Round
- Conference: Western Athletic Conference
- Record: 27–7 (14–4 WAC)
- Head coach: Chris Jans (5th season)
- Assistant coaches: James Miller; David Anwar; Dominique Taylor
- Home arena: Pan American Center

2021–22 WAC men's basketball standings
	Conf.				Overall
Team	W		L	PCT	W		L	PCT
New Mexico State †	14	–	4	.778	27	–	7	.794
Seattle	14	–	4	.778	23	–	9	.719
Stephen F. Austin	14	–	4	.778	22	–	10	.688
Grand Canyon	13	–	5	.722	23	–	8	.742
Sam Houston State	13	–	5	.722	19	–	14	.576
Abilene Christian	11	–	7	.611	25	–	11	.694
Utah Valley	10	–	8	.556	20	–	12	.625
Tarleton State *	9	–	9	.500	14	–	17	.452
California Baptist *	7	–	11	.389	18	–	16	.529
Dixie State *	6	–	12	.333	13	–	17	.433
Texas–Rio Grande Valley	3	–	15	.167	8	–	23	.258
Chicago State	3	–	15	.167	7	–	25	.219
Lamar	0	–	18	.000	2	–	27	.069
† 2022 WAC tournament winner * ineligible for the 2022 NCAA tournament due to transition from NCAA Division II

The 2021–22 New Mexico State Aggies men's basketball team represented New Mexico State University during the 2021–22 NCAA Division I men's basketball season. The Aggies were led by fifth-year head coach Chris Jans and competed as members of the Western Athletic Conference. They finished the season 27–7, 14–4 in WAC play to finish a three-way tie for the regular season championship. As No. 1 seed, they defeated Grand Canyon and Abilene Christian to be champions of the WAC tournament. They received the conference’s automatic bid to the NCAA tournament as the No. 12 seed in the West Region, where they upset UConn in the first round before losing in the second round to Arkansas.

== Previous season ==
The Aggies finished the 2020–21 season 12–8, 7–6 and in third place in WAC play. The Aggies' season ended with a 74–56 loss to Grand Canyon in the 2021 WAC men's basketball tournament.

== Roster ==
2021–22 New Mexico State Aggies men's basketball team
Players
Coaches

Pos.	#	Name	Height	Weight	Year	Previous school	Hometown
G	0	Teddy Allen	6 ft 6 in (1.98 m)	212 lb (96 kg)	RS Jr	Nebraska	Phoenix, AZ
F	1	Marchelus Avery	6 ft 8 in (2.03 m)	205 lb (93 kg)	Fr	Northwest Florida State	Richmond, VA
F	2	Donnie Tillman	6 ft 7 in (2.01 m)	225 lb (102 kg)	Sr	UNLV	Detroit, MI
G	3	Nate Pryor	6 ft 3 in (1.91 m)	175 lb (79 kg)	Jr	Washington	Seattle, WA
G	4	Mario McKinney Jr.	6 ft 1 in (1.85 m)	175 lb (79 kg)	So	John A. Logan College	St. Louis, MO
G	5	Clayton Henry	6 ft 4 in (1.93 m)	201 lb (91 kg)	RS Sr	Palm Beach State College	Calgary, Canada
G	10	Sir'Jabari Rice	6 ft 4 in (1.93 m)	180 lb (82 kg)	RS Jr	Fort Bend Marshall HS	Houston, TX
G	12	Virshon Cotton	6 ft 2 in (1.88 m)	170 lb (77 kg)	RS Jr	LIU	Milwaukee, WI
F	13	Will McNair Jr.	6 ft 10 in (2.08 m)	277 lb (126 kg)	So	Martin Luther King HS	Philadelphia, PA
F	15	Mike Peake	6 ft 7 in (2.01 m)	218 lb (99 kg)	So	Austin Peay	Chicago, IL
G	20	Cameron Crawford	6 ft 1 in (1.85 m)	165 lb (75 kg)	Fr	Kirtland Central HS	Kirtland, NM
G	23	Levar Williams	6 ft 1 in (1.85 m)	190 lb (86 kg)	So	Indian Hills CC	Hyde Park, MA
F	25	Jorge Moreno	6 ft 10 in (2.08 m)	273 lb (124 kg)	Fr	Strength 'n Motion International	Cananea, Sonora, Mexico
F	35	Johnny McCants	6 ft 7 in (2.01 m)	229 lb (104 kg)	RS Sr	Oñate HS	Las Cruces, NM
F	42	Yuat Alok	6 ft 11 in (2.11 m)	211 lb (96 kg)	GS	Coppin State	Auckland, New Zealand
F		Shakiru Odunewu	6 ft 10 in (2.08 m)	255 lb (116 kg)	Fr	Universal Academy	Providence, RI
G		Kiran Oliver	6 ft 3 in (1.91 m)	185 lb (84 kg)	Fr	PHH Prep	Chicago, IL

Head coach

- Chris Jans (Loras)

Assistant coach(es)

- James Miller (CSU Pueblo)
- David Anwar (Fitchburg State)
- Dominique Taylor (East Texas A&M)

Legend

- (C) Team captain
- (S) Suspended
- (I) Ineligible
- (W) Walk-on
- Injured
- Current redshirt

Roster
Last update: February 8, 2022

== Schedule and results ==
Date time, TV	Rank^{#}	Opponent^{#}	Result	Record	High points	High rebounds	High assists	Site (attendance) city, state
Non-conference regular season
November 9, 2021*; 7:00 pm, BSAZ/ESPN+		UC Irvine	W 62–51	1–0	14 – Allen	8 – 2 Tied	4 – McKinney Jr.	Pan American Center (5,056); Las Cruces, NM
November 13, 2021*; 7:00 pm, ESPN+/BSAZ		UTEP; Battle of I-10	W 77–71	2–0	15 – Rice	9 – McCants	3 – Tillman	Pan American Center (8,089); Las Cruces, NM
November 18, 2021*; 10:00 am, ESPNU		vs. Davidson; Myrtle Beach Invitational Quarterfinals	W 76–64	3–0	22 – Allen	6 – McNair Jr.	7 – Rice	HTC Center (1,168); Conway, SC
November 19, 2021*; 10:00 a.m., ESPN2		vs. Utah State; Myrtle Beach Invitational Semifinals	L 58–85	3–1	14 – Allen	7 – Allen	4 – Alok	HTC Center; Conway, SC
November 21, 2021*; 6:30 p.m., ESPN2		vs. Indiana State; Myrtle Beach Invitational 3rd Place Game	W 80–66	4–1	23 – Tillman	15 – McNair Jr.	5 – 2 Tied	HTC Center (1,083); Conway, SC
November 24, 2021*; 6:00 pm, ESPN+		New Mexico Highlands	W 94–67	5–1	21 – Allen	9 – Avery	6 – McKinney Jr.	Pan American Center (4,739); Las Cruces, NM
November 30, 2021*; 7:00 pm, ESPN+/BSAZ		New Mexico; Rio Grande Rivalry	L 94–101	5–2	31 – Allen	9 – Allen	8 – Rice	Pan American Center (6,208); Las Cruces, NM
December 3, 2021*; 7:00 pm, Stadium		at UTEP; Battle of I-10	W 72–69	6–2	19 – Rice	7 – Allen	4 – Rice	Don Haskins Center (6,392); El Paso, TX
December 6, 2021*; 7:00 pm, MWN		at New Mexico; Rio Grande Rivalry	W 78–76 ^{OT}	7–2	20 – Allen	11 – Allen	6 – Rice	The Pit (13,019); Albuquerque, NM
December 11, 2021*; 5:00 pm, WCCN		at Loyola Marymount	W 63–58	8–2	12 – Allen	8 – Allen	2 – 3 Tied	Gersten Pavilion (996); Los Angeles, CA
December 15, 2021*; 8:00 pm, P12N		at Washington State	W 64–61	9–2	22 – Rice	8 – McNair Jr.	5 – Allen	Beasley Coliseum (2,702); Pullman, WA
December 18, 2021*; 4:00 pm, ESPN+		Northern New Mexico	W 93–60	10–2	19 – Allen	11 – McKinney Jr.	8 – Allen	Pan American Center (4,086); Las Cruces, NM
December 20, 2021*; 4:00 pm, ESPN+		UT Permian Basin	W 84–59	11–2	22 – Avery	9 – Allen	4 – McKinney Jr.	Pan American Center (4,315); Las Cruces, NM
WAC Conference Season
January 1, 2022; 4:00 pm, ESPN+/BSAZ/The CW		Chicago State	W 78–61	12–2 (1–0)	15 – Rice	9 – Rice	3 – McNair Jr.	Pan American Center (5,360); Las Cruces, NM
January 6, 2022; 6:00 pm, ESPN+		at Lamar	W 2–0 (Forfeit)	12–2 (2–0)	–	–	–	Montagne Center; Beaumont, TX
January 8, 2022; 6:00 pm, ESPN+		at Texas–Rio Grande Valley	W 85–73	13–2 (3–0)	19 – Allen	11 – Allen	5 – Pryor	UTRGV Fieldhouse (846); Edinburg, TX
January 13, 2022; 7:00 pm, ESPN+/BSAZ		Tarleton State	W 73–57	14–2 (4–0)	15 – 2 Tied	9 – Rice	4 – Rice	Pan American Center (5,131); Las Cruces, NM
January 15, 2022; 4:00 pm, ESPN+/BSAZ+/The CW		Abilene Christian	W 77–63	15–2 (5–0)	41 – Allen	7 – Allen	3 – Rice	Pan American Center (5,014); Las Cruces, NM
January 20, 2022; 5:30 pm, ESPN+		at Sam Houston State	L 46–71	15–3 (5–1)	8 – 2 Tied	5 – Allen	2 – Allen	Bernard Johnson Coliseum (497); Huntsville, TX
January 22, 2022; 1:00 pm, ESPN+		at Stephen F. Austin	W 72–58	17–3 (6–1)	26 – Allen	8 – 2 Tied	4 – Rice	William R. Johnson Coliseum (2,551); Nacogdoches, TX
January 29, 2022; 7:00 pm, ESPN+/BSAZ		Grand Canyon	W 71–61	17–3 (7–1)	28 – Allen	12 – Allen	2 – 2 Tied	Pan American Center (12,307); Las Cruces, NM
February 3, 2022; 7:00 pm, ESPN+/BSAZ		California Baptist	W 68–57	18–3 (8–1)	22 – Allen	7 – McNair Jr.	5 – Rice	Pan American Center (4,431); Las Cruces, NM
February 5, 2022; 4:00 pm, ESPN+/BSAZ+/The CW		Seattle	W 79–64	19–3 (9–1)	33 – Allen	12 – McCants	7 – Rice	Pan American Center (6,302); Las Cruces, NM
February 10, 2022; 7:00 pm, ESPN+		at Dixie State	W 77–69	20–3 (10–1)	20 – Allen	10 – Rice	4 – Rice	Burns Arena (1,333); St. George, UT
February 12, 2022; 2:00 pm, ESPN+		at Utah Valley	L 68–72	20–4 (10–2)	24 – Allen	11 – Allen	6 – McCants	UCCU Center (1,868); Orem, UT
February 16, 2022; 7:00 pm, ESPN+/BSAZ+		Dixie State	W 75–64	21–4 (11–2)	20 – Allen	10 – Allen	5 – Rice	Pan American Center (4,424); Las Cruces, NM
February 19, 2022; 6:00 pm, ESPN+		at Grand Canyon	W 82–66	22–4 (12–2)	30 – Allen	10 – Allen	5 – Allen	GCU Arena (7,174); Phoenix, AZ
February 21, 2022; 8:00 pm, ESPN+		at Seattle	W 68–55	23–4 (13–2)	19 – Allen	14 – McNair Jr.	5 – Allen	Redhawk Center (999); Seattle, WA
February 26, 2022; 1:00 pm, ESPN+		at Chicago State	L 59–61	23–5 (13–3)	15 – Rice	10 – Tillman	7 – Rice	Jones Convocation Center (207); Chicago, IL
March 2, 2022; 7:00 pm, ESPN+/BSAZ+		Stephen F. Austin	L 71–73	23–6 (13–4)	20 – McCants	10 – McCants	4 – Pryor	Pan American Center (5,611); Las Cruces, NM
March 5, 2022; 7:00 pm, ESPN+/BSAZ		Utah Valley	W 62–46	24–6 (14–4)	20 – Allen	13 – McCants	5 – Allen	Pan American Center (5,707); Las Cruces, NM
WAC tournament
March 11, 2022; 6:00 pm, ESPN+	(1)	vs. (4) Grand Canyon; Semifinals	W 75–70	25–6	25 – Allen	7 – Allen	6 – Allen	Orleans Arena; Paradise, NV
March 12, 2022; 7:00 pm, ESPNU	(1)	vs. (6) Abilene Christian; Championship	W 66–52	26–6	15 – Henry	9 – McNair Jr.	3 – Allen	Orleans Arena (3,679); Paradise, NV
NCAA tournament
March 17, 2022*; 4:50 pm, TNT	(12 W)	vs. (5 W) No. 21 UConn; First Round	W 70–63	27–6	37 – Allen	6 – Allen	4 – Rice	KeyBank Center; Buffalo, NY
March 19, 2022*; 6:40 pm, TNT	(12 W)	vs. (4 W) No. 17 Arkansas; Second Round	L 48–53	27–7	16 – McCants	12 – McCants	4 – Pryor	KeyBank Center (18,299); Buffalo, NY
*Non-conference game. ^{#}Rankings from AP Poll. (#) Tournament seedings in parentheses. W=West. All times are in Mountain Time Source.

== See also ==
2021–22 New Mexico State Aggies women's basketball team
