= 2022 WAC men's basketball tournament =

Postseason men's basketball tournament

- Classification: Division I
- Season: 2021–22
- Teams: 10
- Site: Michelob Ultra Arena (first round); Orleans Arena (all other games); Paradise, Nevada
- Champions: New Mexico State (10th title)
- Winning coach: Chris Jans (3rd title)
- MVP: Teddy Allen (New Mexico State)
- Television: ESPN+, ESPNU

2021–22 WAC men's basketball standings
	Conf.				Overall
Team	W		L	PCT	W		L	PCT
New Mexico State †	14	–	4	.778	27	–	7	.794
Seattle	14	–	4	.778	23	–	9	.719
Stephen F. Austin	14	–	4	.778	22	–	10	.688
Grand Canyon	13	–	5	.722	23	–	8	.742
Sam Houston State	13	–	5	.722	19	–	14	.576
Abilene Christian	11	–	7	.611	25	–	11	.694
Utah Valley	10	–	8	.556	20	–	12	.625
Tarleton State *	9	–	9	.500	14	–	17	.452
California Baptist *	7	–	11	.389	18	–	16	.529
Dixie State *	6	–	12	.333	13	–	17	.433
Texas–Rio Grande Valley	3	–	15	.167	8	–	23	.258
Chicago State	3	–	15	.167	7	–	25	.219
Lamar	0	–	18	.000	2	–	27	.069
† 2022 WAC tournament winner * ineligible for the 2022 NCAA tournament due to transition from NCAA Division II

The 2022 WAC men's basketball tournament is the postseason men's basketball tournament of the Western Athletic Conference (WAC) for the 2021–22 season. Held during March 8–12, 2022, in Paradise, Nevada, first-round games were played at the Michelob Ultra Arena with all remaining games at the Orleans Arena. The tournament champion, the New Mexico State Aggies, received the conference's automatic bid to the 2022 NCAA tournament.

== Seeds ==
11 of the 13 teams in the WAC were eligible to compete in the conference tournament. Dixie State and Tarleton State were ineligible due to their transition from Division II to Division I. Teams were seeded by record within the conference, with a tiebreaker system to seed teams with identical conference records. Only the top 10 teams in the conference qualified for the tournament.

Seed	School	Conference	Tiebreaker 1	Tiebreaker 2
1	New Mexico State	14–4	3–1 vs Seattle/Stephen F. Austin	
2	Seattle	14–4	1–2 vs New Mexico State/Stephen F. Austin	1–0 vs Stephen F. Austin
3	Stephen F. Austin	14–4	1–2 vs Seattle/New Mexico State	0–1 vs Seattle
4	Grand Canyon	13–5	1–1 vs Sam Houston State	1–0 vs Seattle
5	Sam Houston State	13–5	1–1 vs Grand Canyon	0–1 vs Seattle
6	Abilene Christian	11–7		
7	Utah Valley	10–8		
8	California Baptist	7–11		
9	UTRGV	3–15	1–0 vs Chicago State	
10	Chicago State	3–15	0–1 vs UTRGV	

With Grand Canyon and Sam Houston State having split their regular-season head-to-head games, the tie for the fourth seed was broken by comparing the tied teams' records against teams that finished tied for the conference's best regular-season record but only including the team or teams Grand Canyon and Sam Houston State each played the same number of times. Grand Canyon played New Mexico State twice and Stephen F. Austin once. Sam Houston State played New Mexico State once and Stephen F. Austin twice. Therefore, the games Grand Canyon and Sam Houston State played against Seattle were used to break the tie, since each team played Seattle once.

== Schedule ==
Session	Game	Time*	Matchup^{#}	Score	Television	Attendance
First round – Tuesday, March 8, 2022
1	1	6:00 pm	No. 8 California Baptist vs. No. 9 UTRGV	81–80	ESPN+	
1	2	8:00 pm	No. 7 Utah Valley vs. No. 10 Chicago State	69–47	ESPN+	
Second round – Wednesday, March 9, 2022
2	3	6:00 pm	No. 5 Sam Houston State vs. No. 8 California Baptist	65–35	ESPN+	
2	4	8:00 pm	No. 6 Abilene Christian vs. No. 7 Utah Valley	82–74	ESPN+	
Third round – Thursday, March 10, 2022
3	5	6:00 pm	No. 4 Grand Canyon vs. No. 5 Sam Houston State	71–66	ESPN+	
3	6	8:30 pm	No. 3 Stephen F. Austin vs. No. 6 Abilene Christian	62–76	ESPN+	
Semifinals – Friday, March 11, 2022
4	7	6:00 pm	No. 1 New Mexico State vs. No. 4 Grand Canyon	75–70	ESPN+	
4	8	8:30 pm	No. 2 Seattle vs. No. 6 Abilene Christian	76–78	ESPN+	
Championship – Saturday, March 12, 2022
5	9	7:00 pm	No. 1 New Mexico State vs. No. 6 Abilene Christian	66–52	ESPNU	
*Game times in PT. #-Rankings denote tournament seeding.

== Bracket ==
First round Tuesday, March 8 ESPN+
8	Cal Baptist	81
9	UTRGV	80
7	Utah Valley	69
10	Chicago State	47

Second round Wednesday, March 9 ESPN+
5	Sam Houston State	65
8	Cal Baptist	35
6	Abilene Christian	82
7	Utah Valley	74

Third round Thursday, March 10; ESPN+
4	Grand Canyon	71
5	Sam Houston State	66
3	Stephen F. Austin	62
6	Abilene Christian	76

Semifinals; Friday, March 11; ESPN+
1	New Mexico State	75
4	Grand Canyon	70
2	Seattle	76
6	Abilene Christian	78

Championship; Saturday, March 12; ESPNU
1	New Mexico State	66
6	Abilene Christian	52

* denotes overtime period
