= 2021–22 Grand Canyon Antelopes men's basketball team =

American college basketball season

2021–22 Grand Canyon Antelopes men's basketball
- Conference: Western Athletic Conference
- Record: 23–8 (13–5 WAC)
- Head coach: Bryce Drew (2nd season)
- Assistant coaches: Jamall Walker; Ed Schilling; Casey Shaw
- Home arena: GCU Arena

2021–22 WAC men's basketball standings
	Conf.				Overall
Team	W		L	PCT	W		L	PCT
New Mexico State †	14	–	4	.778	27	–	7	.794
Seattle	14	–	4	.778	23	–	9	.719
Stephen F. Austin	14	–	4	.778	22	–	10	.688
Grand Canyon	13	–	5	.722	23	–	8	.742
Sam Houston State	13	–	5	.722	19	–	14	.576
Abilene Christian	11	–	7	.611	25	–	11	.694
Utah Valley	10	–	8	.556	20	–	12	.625
Tarleton State *	9	–	9	.500	14	–	17	.452
California Baptist *	7	–	11	.389	18	–	16	.529
Dixie State *	6	–	12	.333	13	–	17	.433
Texas–Rio Grande Valley	3	–	15	.167	8	–	23	.258
Chicago State	3	–	15	.167	7	–	25	.219
Lamar	0	–	18	.000	2	–	27	.069
† 2022 WAC tournament winner * ineligible for the 2022 NCAA tournament due to transition from NCAA Division II

The 2021–22 Grand Canyon Antelopes men's basketball team represented Grand Canyon University during the 2021–22 NCAA Division I men's basketball season. They were led by head coach Bryce Drew in his second season. The Antelopes played their home games at GCU Arena in Phoenix, Arizona as members of the Western Athletic Conference.

== Previous season ==
The 2020–21 Antelopes won the WAC regular-season championship and the 2021 WAC men's basketball tournament. The 2020–21 team is the first-ever Grand Canyon team to be selected for March Madness, being selected as a 15-seed in the West region for the 2021 NCAA Division I men's basketball tournament, where they lost to Iowa in the first round.

== Roster ==
2021–22 Grand Canyon Antelopes men's basketball team
Players
Coaches

Pos.	#	Name	Height	Weight	Year	Hometown
G	0	Sean Miller-Moore	6 ft 4 in (1.93 m)	210 lb (95 kg)	Sr	Toronto, ON
F/C	1	Dima Zdor	6 ft 10 in (2.08 m)	230 lb (104 kg)	Jr	Yalta, Ukraine
G	2	Chance McMillian	6 ft 4 in (1.93 m)	185 lb (84 kg)	Fr	Vallejo, CA
G	3	Kobe Knox	6 ft 5 in (1.96 m)	185 lb (84 kg)	Fr	Tampa, FL
G	5	Jalen Blackmon	6 ft 3 in (1.91 m)	180 lb (82 kg)	Fr	Marion, IN
G	10	Jovan Blacksher Jr.	5 ft 11 in (1.8 m)	165 lb (75 kg)	So	Oakland, CA
G	11	Holland Woods II	6 ft 1 in (1.85 m)	190 lb (86 kg)	Sr	Phoenix, AZ
F	13	Aidan Igiehon	6 ft 10 in (2.08 m)	245 lb (111 kg)	So	Dublin, Ireland
G	14	Jayden Stone	6 ft 4 in (1.93 m)	195 lb (88 kg)	Fr	Perth, Australia
F	15	Raef Gerdes	6 ft 7 in (2.01 m)	185 lb (84 kg)	Jr	Lee's Summit, MO
G	21	Liam Lloyd	6 ft 5 in (1.96 m)	200 lb (91 kg)	Fr	Spokane, WA
F	24	Yvan Ouedraogo	6 ft 9 in (2.06 m)	255 lb (116 kg)	So	Bordeaux, France
F	30	Gabe McGlothan	6 ft 7 in (2.01 m)	230 lb (104 kg)	RS So	Gilbert, AZ
F	31	Ethan Spry	6 ft 7 in (2.01 m)	215 lb (98 kg)	So	Phoenix, AZ
G	33	Isaiah Shaw	6 ft 7 in (2.01 m)	190 lb (86 kg)	Fr	Rome, Italy
F	35	Taeshon Cherry	6 ft 8 in (2.03 m)	225 lb (102 kg)	Jr	El Cajon, CA
G	55	Walter Ellis	6 ft 5 in (1.96 m)	190 lb (86 kg)	Jr	Granger, IN

Head coach

- Bryce Drew (Valparaiso)

Assistant coach(es)

- Jamall Walker (Saint Louis)
- Ed Schilling (Miami (OH))
- Casey Shaw (Toledo)

Legend

- (C) Team captain
- (S) Suspended
- (I) Ineligible
- (W) Walk-on
- Injured
- Current redshirt

Roster
Last update: February 8, 2022

== Schedule and results ==
Date time, TV	Rank^{#}	Opponent^{#}	Result	Record	Site (attendance) city, state
Exhibition
October 30, 2021*; 6:00 pm, Fox 10 Xtra/ESPN+		Western New Mexico	W 85–59	–	GCU Arena (7,319); Phoenix, AZ
Non-conference regular season
November 9, 2021*; 7:00 pm, Fox 10 Xtra/ESPN+		Grambling	W 74–53	1–0	GCU Arena (7,145); Phoenix, AZ
November 12, 2021*; 7:00 pm, Fox 10 Xtra/ESPN+		North Florida	W 65–51	2–0	GCU Arena (7,305); Phoenix, AZ
November 17, 2021*; 7:00 pm, Fox 10 Xtra/ESPN+		Prairie View A&M	W 91–64	3–0	GCU Arena (6,854); Phoenix, AZ
November 22, 2021*; 7:00 pm, Fox 10 Xtra/ESPN+		Wyoming	L 61–68	3–1	GCU Arena (6,872); Phoenix, AZ
November 24, 2021*; 6:00 pm, Fox 10 Xtra/ESPN+		Life Pacific	W 82–47	4–1	GCU Arena (6,529); Phoenix, AZ
November 27, 2021*; 4:00 pm, WCCN		at Pepperdine	W 59–56	5–1	Firestone Fieldhouse (1,570); Malibu, CA
November 29, 2021*; 8:00 pm, WCCN		at Loyola Marymount	W 78–72	6–1	Gersten Pavilion (1,135); Los Angeles, CA
December 2, 2021*; 7:00 pm, Fox 10 Xtra/ESPN+		UTSA	W 74–71	7–1	GCU Arena (6,844); Phoenix, AZ
December 4, 2021*; 6:00 pm, Fox 10 Xtra/ESPN+		Mississippi Valley State	W 91–44	8–1	GCU Arena (6,715); Phoenix, AZ
December 9, 2021*; 7:30 pm, P12N		at Arizona State	L 62–67	8–2	Desert Financial Arena (11,391); Tempe, AZ
December 11, 2021*; 6:00 pm, Fox 10 Xtra/ESPN+		Ottawa (AZ)	W 81–53	9–2	GCU Arena (7,007); Phoenix, AZ
December 18, 2021*; 5:30 pm, FloSports		vs. San Francisco; Jerry Colangelo Classic	W 49–48	10–2	Footprint Center (1,578); Phoenix, AZ
December 21, 2021*; 8:00 pm, MWN		at Nevada	Canceled due to COVID19 protocols		Lawlor Events Center; Reno, NV
WAC Conference Season
December 30, 2021; 6:00 pm, Fox 10 Xtra/ESPN+		Chicago State	W 80–63	11–2 (1–0)	GCU Arena (6,817); Phoenix, AZ
January 6, 2022; 6:00 pm, ESPN+		at Texas–Rio Grande Valley	W 84–70	12–2 (2–0)	UTRGV Fieldhouse (878); Edinburg, TX
January 8, 2022; 2:00 pm, ESPN+		at Lamar	W 2–0 (Forfeit)	12–2 (3–0)	Montagne Center; Beaumont, TX
January 13, 2022; 7:00 pm, Fox 10 Xtra/ESPN+		Abilene Christian	W 95–68	13–2 (4–0)	GCU Arena (6,815); Phoenix, AZ
January 15, 2022; 6:00 pm, ESPNU		Tarleton State	W 80–59	14–2 (5–0)	GCU Arena (7,499); Phoenix, AZ
January 20, 2022; 5:30 pm, ESPN+		at Stephen F. Austin	L 46–71	14–3 (5–1)	William R. Johnson Coliseum (2,304); Nacogdoches, TX
January 22, 2022; 1:00 pm, ESPN+		at Sam Houston State	L 56–58	14–4 (5–2)	Bernard Johnson Coliseum (602); Huntsville, TX
January 29, 2022; 7:00 pm, ESPN+		at New Mexico State	L 61–71	14–5 (5–3)	Pan American Center (12,307); Las Cruces, NM
February 3, 2022; 7:00 pm, Fox 10 Xtra/ESPN+		Seattle	W 78–66	15–5 (6–3)	GCU Arena (6,905); Phoenix, AZ
February 5, 2022; 6:00 pm, Fox 10 Xtra/ESPN+		California Baptist	W 56–50	16–5 (7–3)	GCU Arena (7,107); Phoenix, AZ
February 10, 2022; 6:00 pm, ESPN+		at Utah Valley	W 79–69	17–5 (8–3)	UCCU Center (3,724); Orem, UT
February 12, 2022; 7:00 pm, ESPN+		at Dixie State	L 60–61	17–6 (8–4)	Burns Arena (1,898); St. George, UT
February 16, 2022; 8:00 pm, ESPN+		at California Baptist	W 65–60	18–6 (9–4)	CBU Events Center (5,050); Riverside, CA
February 19, 2022; 6:00 pm, Fox 10 Xtra/ESPN+		New Mexico State	L 66–82	18–7 (9–5)	GCU Arena (7,174); Phoenix, AZ
February 23, 2022; 6:00 pm, ESPN+		at Chicago State	W 85–64	19–7 (10–5)	Jones Convocation Center; Chicago, IL
February 26, 2022; 6:00 pm, Fox 10 Xtra/ESPN+		Sam Houston State	W 67–41	20–7 (11–5)	GCU Arena (7,112); Phoenix, AZ
March 3, 2022; 7:00 pm, Fox 10 Xtra/ESPN+		Utah Valley	W 68–57	21–7 (12–5)	GCU Arena (6,950); Phoenix, AZ
March 5, 2022; 6:00 pm, Fox 10 Xtra/ESPN+		Dixie State	W 70–53	22–7 (13–5)	GCU Arena (7,412); Phoenix, AZ
WAC tournament
March 10, 2022; 7:00 pm, ESPN+	(4)	vs. (5) Sam Houston State; Third round	W 69–66	23–7	Orleans Arena; Paradise, NV
March 11, 2022; 6:00 pm, ESPN+	(4)	vs. (1) New Mexico State; Semifinals	L 70–75	23–8	Orleans Arena; Paradise, NV
*Non-conference game. ^{#}Rankings from AP poll. (#) Tournament seedings in parentheses. W=West. All times are in Mountain Time.

== See also ==
- 2021–22 Grand Canyon Antelopes women's basketball team
