= 2021–22 Chicago State Cougars men's basketball team =

American college basketball season

2021–22 Chicago State Cougars men's basketball
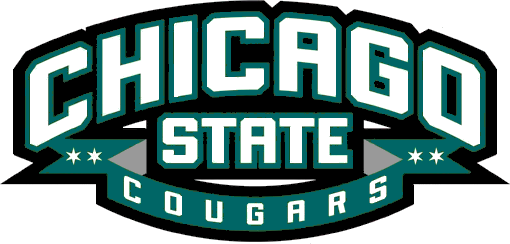
- Conference: Western Athletic Conference
- Record: 7–25 (3–15 WAC)
- Head coach: Gerald Gillion (1st season)
- Assistant coaches: Baronton Terry; Tramaine Stevens; Jelani Hewitt
- Home arena: Jones Convocation Center

2021–22 WAC men's basketball standings
	Conf.				Overall
Team	W		L	PCT	W		L	PCT
New Mexico State †	14	–	4	.778	27	–	7	.794
Seattle	14	–	4	.778	23	–	9	.719
Stephen F. Austin	14	–	4	.778	22	–	10	.688
Grand Canyon	13	–	5	.722	23	–	8	.742
Sam Houston State	13	–	5	.722	19	–	14	.576
Abilene Christian	11	–	7	.611	25	–	11	.694
Utah Valley	10	–	8	.556	20	–	12	.625
Tarleton State *	9	–	9	.500	14	–	17	.452
California Baptist *	7	–	11	.389	18	–	16	.529
Dixie State *	6	–	12	.333	13	–	17	.433
Texas–Rio Grande Valley	3	–	15	.167	8	–	23	.258
Chicago State	3	–	15	.167	7	–	25	.219
Lamar	0	–	18	.000	2	–	27	.069
† 2022 WAC tournament winner * ineligible for the 2022 NCAA tournament due to transition from NCAA Division II

The 2021–22 Chicago State Cougars men's basketball team represented Chicago State University in the 2021–22 NCAA Division I men's basketball season. The Cougars were led by first-year head coach Gerald Gillion and played their home games at the Emil and Patricia Jones Convocation Center as members of the Western Athletic Conference (WAC).

This was Chicago State's final season in the WAC, and a new conference was not officially announced.

The Cougars finished the season 7–25, 3–15 in WAC play, to finish in a tie for 11th place. As the No. 10 seed in the WAC tournament, they were defeated by 7th seed Utah Valley in the first round.

== Previous season ==
In a season limited due to the ongoing COVID-19 pandemic, the Cougars finished the 2020–21 season 0–9, 0–0 in WAC play, before suspending the season due to COVID-19 and an insufficient number of players.

On July 1, 2021, the school fired head coach Lance Irvin after three years at the school. On July 19, the school named Samford assistant Gerald Gillion the new head coach.

== Roster ==
2021–22 Chicago State Cougars men's basketball team
Players
Coaches

Pos.	#	Name	Height	Weight	Year	Hometown
G	0	Jameon "J.J." Harris	6 ft 3 in (1.91 m)	190 lb (86 kg)	Fr	Tallahassee, FL
G	1	Andrew Lewis	6 ft 3 in (1.91 m)	180 lb (82 kg)	Sr	Milwaukee, WI
G	2	Dominique Alexander	5 ft 10 in (1.78 m)	160 lb (73 kg)	Sr	Los Angeles, CA
G	3	Bryce Johnson	6 ft 3 in (1.91 m)	172 lb (78 kg)	Fr	Orlando, FL
G	5	Favour Chukwukelu	6 ft 1 in (1.85 m)	170 lb (77 kg)	Jr	Las Vegas, NV
G	10	Carlo Marble	6 ft 5 in (1.96 m)	200 lb (91 kg)	Sr	Des Moines, IA
G	11	Brandon Betson	6 ft 1 in (1.85 m)	180 lb (82 kg)	Jr	Hercules, CA
G	13	Robert Pierce Blount	6 ft 1 in (1.85 m)	185 lb (84 kg)	Fr	Lutz, FL
G	14	Ali Abdou Dibba	6 ft 4 in (1.93 m)	185 lb (84 kg)	Fr	Bredäng, Sweden
G	15	Coreyoun Rushin	6 ft 5 in (1.96 m)	200 lb (91 kg)	Sr	Chicago, IL
G	21	Kedrick Green	6 ft 2 in (1.88 m)	180 lb (82 kg)	Fr	Atlanta, GA
F	22	Teddy Bayi Ba Mandeng	6 ft 9 in (2.06 m)	200 lb (91 kg)	Jr	Paris, France
G	23	Jincho Rivera	6 ft 5 in (1.96 m)	195 lb (88 kg)	Fr	Carolina, Puerto Rico
G	24	Jahsean Corbett	6 ft 6 in (1.98 m)	195 lb (88 kg)	Fr	Kissimmee, FL
F	25	Noah Bigirumwami	6 ft 10 in (2.08 m)	225 lb (102 kg)	Sr	Santa Clarita, CA

Head coach

- Gerald Gillion (Florida State)

Assistant coach(es)

- Baronton Terry
- Tramaine Stevens (Morehead State)
- Jelani Hewitt (Georgia Southern)

Legend

- (C) Team captain
- (S) Suspended
- (I) Ineligible
- (W) Walk-on
- Injured
- Current redshirt

Roster
Last update: February 10, 2022

== Schedule ==
Date time, TV	Rank^{#}	Opponent^{#}	Result	Record	High points	High rebounds	High assists	Site (attendance) city, state
Non-conference regular season
November 9, 2021*; 7:00 p.m., ESPN+		St. Thomas (MN)	W 77–72	1–0	22 – Betson	8 – Corbett	4 – Betson	Jones Convocation Center (300); Chicago, IL
November 12, 2021*; 7:00 p.m., ESPN+		SIU Edwardsville	W 67–56	2–0	17 – Johnson	8 – Rushin	4 – Green	Jones Convocation Center (350); Chicago, IL
November 16, 2021*; 7:00 p.m., NBCSC		at Loyola–Chicago	L 56–92	2–1	21 – Betson	9 – Rushin	4 – Betson	Joseph J. Gentile Arena (2,637); Chicago, IL
November 20, 2021*; 4:00 p.m., ESPN+		at UC Santa Barbara	L 50–81	2–2	11 – Betson	7 – Rushin	3 – Betson	The Thunderdome (824); Santa Barbara, CA
November 22, 2021*; 9:00 p.m.		at Pacific	L 58–74	2–3	24 – Johnson	6 – Corbett	3 – Betson	Alex G. Spanos Center (173); Stockton, CA
Nov 28, 2021*; 2:00 p.m., ESPN3		at Bowling Green	L 57–75	2–4	17 – Betson	13 – Chukwukelu	4 – Betson	Stroh Center (1,314); Bowling Green, OH
December 1, 2021*; 7:00 p.m.		at Loyola (MD)	L 64–78	2–5	15 – tied	13 – Chukwukelu	4 – tied	Reitz Arena (814); Baltimore, MD
December 4, 2021*; 4:00 p.m., ESPN+		Tennessee State	W 59–49	3–5	17 – Corbett	8 – Corbett	3 – tied	Jones Convocation Center (597); Chicago, IL
December 11, 2021*; 2:00 p.m., ESPN+		Illinois State	L 71–80	3–6	17 – Corbett	9 – Rushin	4 – Alexander	Jones Convocation Center (267); Chicago, IL
December 13, 2021*; 12:00 p.m., ESPN+		Northern Illinois	L 59–70	3–7	13 – Betson	6 – Chukwukelu	3 – Betson	Jones Convocation Center (262); Chicago, IL
December 16, 2021*; 6:00 p.m., ESPN+		at IUPUI	W 61–55	4–7	17 – Alexander	9 – Rushin	3 – Betson	Indiana Farmers Coliseum (725); Indianapolis, IN
December 21, 2021*; 6:00 p.m., Big 12 Now		at No. 9 Iowa State	L 48–79	4–8	14 – Corbett	11 – tied	3 – tied	Hilton Coliseum (11,894); Ames, IA
December 22, 2021*; 5:00 pm		at Drake	L 50–87	4–9	13 – Rushin	9 – Chukwukelu	2 – tied (3)	Knapp Center (11,894); Des Moines, IA
WAC conference season
December 30, 2021; 8:00 p.m., ESPN+		at Grand Canyon	L 63–80	4–10 (0–1)	21 – Dibba	9 – Rushin	1 – tied (3)	GCU Arena (6,817); Phoenix, AZ
January 1, 2022; 4:00 p.m., ESPN+		at New Mexico State	L 61–78	4–11 (0–2)	26 – Corbett	7 – Rushin	3 – Betson	Pan American Center (5,360); Las Cruces, NM
January 6, 2022; 7:00 p.m., ESPN+		Seattle	L 77–93	4–12 (0–3)	24 – Dibba	6 – tied	5 – Alexander	Jones Convocation Center (187); Chicago, IL
January 8, 2022; 12:00 p.m., ESPN+		California Baptist	W 58–56	5–12 (1–3)	13 – Corbett	9 – Corbett	4 – Alexander	Jones Convocation Center (102); Chicago, IL
January 13, 2022; 7:00 p.m., ESPN+		at Texas–Rio Grande Valley	L 63–85	5–12 (1–4)	15 – Alexander	7 – tied	5 – tied	UTRGV Fieldhouse (537); Edinburg, TX
January 15, 2022; 3:00 p.m., ESPN+		at Lamar	W 67–56	6–13 (2–4)	18 – Betson	11 – Bigirumwami	5 – tied	Montagne Center (1,582); Beaumont, TX
January 27, 2022; 7:00 p.m., ESPN+		Utah Valley	L 87–101	6–14 (2–5)	23 – Alexander	5 – Alexander	5 – Alexander	Jones Convocation Center (250); Chicago, IL
January 29, 2022; 2:00 p.m., ESPN+		Dixie State	L 65–79	6–15 (2–6)	16 – Rushin	7 – tied	3 – Johnson	Jones Convocation Center (119); Chicago, IL
February 2, 2022; 7:00 p.m., ESPN+		at Abilene Christian	L 73–77	6–16 (2–7)	22 – Betson	10 – Rushin	4 – Betson	Teague Center (444); Abilene, TX
February 5, 2022; 7:00 p.m., ESPN+		at Tarleton State	L 54–57	6–17 (2–8)	16 – Betson	15 – Rushin	5 – Rushin	Wisdom Gymnasium (2,233); Stephenville, TX
February 10, 2022; 7:00 p.m., ESPN+		Stephen F. Austin	L 59–72	6–18 (2–9)	13 – Corbett	9 – Corbett	2 – tied	Jones Convocation Center (147); Chicago, IL
February 12, 2022; 7:00 p.m., ESPN+		Sam Houston State	L 61–81	6–19 (2–10)	15 – Johnson	7 – Alexander	5 – Betson	Jones Convocation Center (142); Chicago, IL
February 16, 2022; 2:00 p.m., ESPN+		Stephen F. Austin	L 71–88	6–20 (2–11)	17 – Johnson	8 – Johnson	5 – Betson	Johnson Coliseum (1,524); Nacogdoches, TX
February 19, 2022; 2:00 p.m., ESPN+		Tarleton State	L 60–79	6–21 (2–12)	12 – Betson	12 – Corbett	4 – Harris	Jones Convocation Center (128); Chicago, IL
February 23, 2022; 7:00 p.m., ESPN+		Grand Canyon	L 64–85	6–22 (2–13)	16 – Harris	5 – Rushin	3 – Betson	Jones Convocation Center (151); Chicago, IL
February 26, 2022; 2:00 p.m., ESPN+		New Mexico State	W 61–59	7–22 (3–13)	17 – Betson	9 – Corbett	8 – Betson	Jones Convocation Center (207); Chicago, IL
March 2, 2022; 9:00 p.m., ESPN+		at California Baptist	L 53–62	7–23 (3–14)	24 – Betson	8 – Corbett	1 – tied	CBU Events Center (3,565); Riverside, CA
Mar 5, 2022; 3:00 p.m., ESPN+		at Seattle	L 66–74	7–24 (3–15)	31 – Betson	14 – Corbett	2 – tied	Redhawk Center (999); Seattle, WA
WAC tournament
March 8, 2022; 6:00 p.m., ESPN+	(10)	vs. (7) Utah Valley; First round	L 47–69	7–25	21 – Corbett	8 – Corbett	2 – tied	Orleans Arena (867); Paradise, NV
*Non-conference game. ^{#}Rankings from AP poll. (#) Tournament seedings in parentheses. All times are in Central.

== See also ==
- 2021–22 Chicago State Cougars women's basketball team
