= 2021–22 California Baptist Lancers men's basketball team =

American college basketball season

2021–22 California Baptist Lancers men's basketball

CBI, First Round
- Conference: Western Athletic Conference
- Record: 18–16 (7–11 WAC)
- Head coach: Rick Croy (9th season)
- Associate head coach: Hardy Asprilla
- Assistant coaches: Adam Jacobsen; Geoff McIntosh
- Home arena: CBU Events Center

2021–22 WAC men's basketball standings
	Conf.				Overall
Team	W		L	PCT	W		L	PCT
New Mexico State †	14	–	4	.778	27	–	7	.794
Seattle	14	–	4	.778	23	–	9	.719
Stephen F. Austin	14	–	4	.778	22	–	10	.688
Grand Canyon	13	–	5	.722	23	–	8	.742
Sam Houston State	13	–	5	.722	19	–	14	.576
Abilene Christian	11	–	7	.611	25	–	11	.694
Utah Valley	10	–	8	.556	20	–	12	.625
Tarleton State *	9	–	9	.500	14	–	17	.452
California Baptist *	7	–	11	.389	18	–	16	.529
Dixie State *	6	–	12	.333	13	–	17	.433
Texas–Rio Grande Valley	3	–	15	.167	8	–	23	.258
Chicago State	3	–	15	.167	7	–	25	.219
Lamar	0	–	18	.000	2	–	27	.069
† 2022 WAC tournament winner * ineligible for the 2022 NCAA tournament due to transition from NCAA Division II

The 2021–22 California Baptist Lancers men's basketball team represented California Baptist University (CBU) in the 2021–22 NCAA Division I men's basketball season. The Lancers, led by ninth-year head coach Rick Croy, played their home games at the CBU Events Center in Riverside, California as members of the Western Athletic Conference.

The season marked CBU's final year of a four-year transition period from Division II to Division I. As a result, the Lancers were not eligible for NCAA postseason play, but could participate in the WAC tournament. They finished the regular season 17–14, 7–11 in WAC play, to finish in 9th place. They defeated Texas–Rio Grande Valley in the first round of the WAC Tournament before losing in the second round to Sam Houston State.

The Lancers accepted an invitation to the College Basketball Invitational, where they lost to Middle Tennessee in the first round.

== Previous season ==
In a season limited by the ongoing COVID-19 pandemic, the Lancers finished the 2020–21 season 13–10, 6–6 in WAC play, to finish in fourth place. They lost to Seattle in the quarterfinals of the WAC tournament.

== Roster ==
2021–22 California Baptist Lancers men's basketball team
Players
Coaches

Pos.	#	Name	Height	Weight	Year	Hometown
G	0	Tyree Campbell	6 ft 5 in (1.96 m)	190 lb (86 kg)	Fr	Rancho Cucamonga, CA
G	1	Taran Armstrong	6 ft 5 in (1.96 m)	185 lb (84 kg)	Fr	Burnie, Australia
G	2	Freddie Dybala	6 ft 3 in (1.91 m)	190 lb (86 kg)	Fr	Corona, CA
G	3	Aldo Ruiz Ortiz	6 ft 1 in (1.85 m)	185 lb (84 kg)	Fr	Veracruz, Mexico
G	4	Elijah Thomas	6 ft 5 in (1.96 m)	220 lb (100 kg)	GS	Peoria, AZ
G	5	Reed Nottage	6 ft 7 in (2.01 m)	220 lb (100 kg)	So	Sydney, Australia
G	11	Tre Armstrong	6 ft 5 in (1.96 m)	205 lb (93 kg)	So	Burnie, Australia
G	12	Scotty Washington	6 ft 4 in (1.93 m)	165 lb (75 kg)	Fr	Bellflower, CA
G	13	Chance Hunter	6 ft 6 in (1.98 m)	200 lb (91 kg)	Jr	Inglewood, CA
G	14	Tobin Kund	6 ft 1 in (1.85 m)	180 lb (82 kg)	Jr	Riverside, CA
F	21	Malik Wade	6 ft 8 in (2.03 m)	230 lb (104 kg)	Fr	Espírito Santo do Pinhal, Brazil
G	25	Ty Rowell	6 ft 2 in (1.88 m)	185 lb (84 kg)	RS Jr	Langley, BC
F	30	Dan Akin	6 ft 9 in (2.06 m)	225 lb (102 kg)	GS	London, England
F	32	Juhlawnei Stone	6 ft 7 in (2.01 m)	230 lb (104 kg)	Fr	Lancaster, CA
G	33	Keanu Rasmussen	6 ft 3 in (1.91 m)	185 lb (84 kg)	Fr	Adelaide, Australia
F	35	Te'Jon Sawyer	6 ft 8 in (2.03 m)	255 lb (116 kg)	Fr	San Francisco, CA

Head coach

- Rick Croy (Azusa Pacific)

Assistant coach(es)

- Hardy Asprilla (Cal State Fullerton)
- Adam Jacobsen (Pacific)
- Geoff McIntosh (Cal State Monterey Bay)

Legend

- (C) Team captain
- (S) Suspended
- (I) Ineligible
- (W) Walk-on
- Injured
- Current redshirt

Roster
Last update: February 9, 2022

== Schedule and results ==
Date time, TV	Rank^{#}	Opponent^{#}	Result	Record	Site (attendance) city, state
Non-conference season
November 9, 2021*; 7:00 pm, ESPN+		San Francisco State	W 87–65	1–0	CBU Events Center (4,308); Riverside, CA
November 13, 2021*; 7:00 pm, ESPN+		Mississippi Valley State	W 95–66	2–0	CBU Events Center (4,957); Riverside, CA
November 16, 2021*; 7:00 pm, ESPN+		Jackson State	W 77–64	3–0	CBU Events Center (2,631); Riverside, CA
November 18, 2021*; 7:00 pm, ESPN+		San José State	W 67–66	4–0	CBU Events Center (3,004); Riverside, CA
November 21, 2021*; 7:00 pm, ESPN+		Northern Colorado	W 74–70	5–0	CBU Events Center (2,229); Riverside, CA
November 24, 2021*; 5:30 pm, LHN		at No. 8 Texas	L 44–68	5–1	Frank Erwin Center (10,878); Austin, TX
November 27, 2021*; 7:00 pm, ESPN+		San Diego Christian	W 85–38	6–1	CBU Events Center (2,248); Riverside, CA
December 2, 2021*; 7:00 pm, ESPN+		Cal Poly	W 64–55	7–1	CBU Events Center (3,401); Riverside, CA
December 7, 2021*; 7:00 pm, ESPN+		North Dakota	W 89–71	8–1	CBU Events Center (2,606); Riverside, CA
December 12, 2021*; 4:00 pm, ESPN+		at UC Riverside	L 54–70	8–2	SRC Arena (884); Riverside, CA
December 18, 2021*; 3:00 pm, P12N		at No. 8 Arizona	L 60–84	8–3	McKale Center (14,623); Tucson, AZ
December 21, 2021*; 3:00 pm, ESPN+		Southeast Missouri State	W 84–68	9–3	CBU Events Center (2,220); Riverside, CA
December 28, 2021*; 7:00 pm, ESPN+		La Verne	W 96–41	10–3	CBU Events Center (1,892); Riverside, CA
WAC conference season
January 8, 2022; 10:00 am, ESPN+		at Chicago State	L 56–58	10–4 (0–1)	Jones Convocation Center (102); Chicago, IL
January 12, 2022; 7:00 pm, ESPN+		Dixie State	L 76–79	10–5 (0–2)	CBU Events Center (2,014); Riverside, CA
January 15, 2022; 7:00 pm, ESPN+		Utah Valley	W 75–73	11–5 (1–2)	CBU Events Center (2,305); Riverside, CA
January 17, 2022; 7:00 pm, ESPN+		Seattle; Rescheduled from Jan. 1	L 85–92 ^{OT}	11–6 (1–3)	CBU Events Center (2,531); Riverside, CA
January 20, 2022; 5:00 pm, ESPN+		at Tarleton State	W 88–84	12–6 (2–3)	Wisdom Gymnasium (1,899); Stephenville, TX
January 22, 2022; 1:00 pm, ESPN+		at Abilene Christian	L 68–77	12–7 (2–4)	Teague Center (726); Abilene, TX
January 26, 2022; 7:00 pm, ESPN+		Sam Houston State	L 68–73	12–8 (2–5)	CBU Events Center (3,005); Riverside, CA
January 29, 2022; 7:00 pm, ESPN+		Stephen F. Austin	L 77–81	12–9 (2–6)	CBU Events Center (4,311); Riverside, CA
February 3, 2022; 6:00 pm, ESPN+		at New Mexico State	L 57–68	12–10 (2–7)	Pan American Center (4,431); Las Cruces, NM
February 5, 2022; 6:00 pm, ESPN+		at Grand Canyon	L 50–56	12–11 (2–8)	GCU Arena (7,107); Phoenix, AZ
February 10, 2022; 7:00 pm, ESPN+		Lamar	W 83–61	13–11 (3–8)	CBU Events Center (2,436); Riverside, CA
February 12, 2022; 7:00 pm, ESPN+		Texas–Rio Grande Valley	W 80–72	14–11 (4–8)	CBU Events Center (4,651); Riverside, CA
February 16, 2022; 7:00 pm, ESPN+		Grand Canyon	L 60–65	14–12 (4–9)	CBU Events Center (5,050); Riverside, CA
February 19, 2022; 1:00 pm, ESPN+		at Seattle	L 64–67	14–13 (4–10)	Redhawk Center (1,670); Seattle, WA
February 24, 2022; 6:00 pm, ESPN+		at Dixie State	W 71–61	15–13 (5–10)	Burns Arena (1,269); St. George, UT
February 26, 2022; 1:00 pm, ESPN+		at Utah Valley	L 54–63	15–14 (5–11)	UCCU Center (2,187); Orem, UT
March 2, 2022; 7:00 pm, ESPN+		Chicago State	W 62–53	16–14 (6–11)	CBU Events Center (3,565); Riverside, CA
March 5, 2022; 1:00 pm, ESPN+		at Lamar	W 78–66	17–14 (7–11)	Montagne Center (2,345); Beaumont, TX
WAC tournament
March 8, 2022; 8:00 pm, ESPN+	(8)	vs. (9) Texas–Rio Grande Valley; First round	W 81–80	18–14	Orleans Arena (307); Paradise, NV
March 9, 2022; 6:00 pm, ESPN+	(8)	vs. (5) Sam Houston State; Second round	L 35–65	18–15	Orleans Arena; Paradise, NV
CBI
March 19, 2022; 2:00 pm, FloHoops	(15)	vs. (2) Middle Tennessee; First round	L 58–64	18–16	Ocean Center (578); Daytona Beach, FL
*Non-conference game. ^{#}Rankings from AP poll. (#) Tournament seedings in parentheses. All times are in Pacific.

== See also ==
- 2021–22 California Baptist Lancers women's basketball team
