= 2021–22 Dixie State Trailblazers men's basketball team =

American college basketball season

2021–22 Dixie State Trailblazers men's basketball
- Conference: Western Athletic Conference
- Record: 13–18 (6–12 WAC)
- Head coach: Jon Judkins (17th season)
- Assistant coaches: Jake Schroeder (3rd season); Andrew May (3rd season); Anthony Morris (1st season)
- Home arena: Burns Arena

2021–22 WAC men's basketball standings
	Conf.				Overall
Team	W		L	PCT	W		L	PCT
New Mexico State †	14	–	4	.778	27	–	7	.794
Seattle	14	–	4	.778	23	–	9	.719
Stephen F. Austin	14	–	4	.778	22	–	10	.688
Grand Canyon	13	–	5	.722	23	–	8	.742
Sam Houston State	13	–	5	.722	19	–	14	.576
Abilene Christian	11	–	7	.611	25	–	11	.694
Utah Valley	10	–	8	.556	20	–	12	.625
Tarleton State *	9	–	9	.500	14	–	17	.452
California Baptist *	7	–	11	.389	18	–	16	.529
Dixie State *	6	–	12	.333	13	–	17	.433
Texas–Rio Grande Valley	3	–	15	.167	8	–	23	.258
Chicago State	3	–	15	.167	7	–	25	.219
Lamar	0	–	18	.000	2	–	27	.069
† 2022 WAC tournament winner * ineligible for the 2022 NCAA tournament due to transition from NCAA Division II

The 2021–22 Dixie State Trailblazers men's basketball team represented Dixie State University in the 2021–22 NCAA Division I men's basketball season. The Trailblazers, led by 17th-year head coach Jon Judkins, played their home games at Burns Arena in St. George, Utah as members of the Western Athletic Conference (WAC).

The 2021–22 season was Dixie State's second year of a four-year transition period from Division II to Division I. As a result, the Trailblazers were not eligible for NCAA postseason play and could not participate in the WAC tournament. However, they were eligible to play in the CIT or CBI, if invited.

This was also Dixie State's final season under that name; the school changed its name to Utah Tech University effective with the 2022–23 school year. The Trailblazers nickname is not affected.

== Previous season ==
The Trailblazers finished the 2020–21 season 8-13 overall, and 4-10 in WAC play. The season was Dixie's worst as an institution at the NCAA level, and their first losing season since 2007-08. However, six contests were canceled due to the COVID-19 pandemic.

== Offseason ==
=== Coaching changes ===
==== Departures ====
Name	Position	Year at Dixie State	Alma mater (year)	Reason for departure
David Foster	Volunteer Assistant Coach	4th	Utah (2012)	Left team

==== Additions to staff ====
Name	Position	Year at Dixie State	Alma mater (year)	Previous job
Anthony Morris	Assistant coach	1st	Washington (2018)	Assistant coach at Eastern New Mexico

=== Player departures ===
Name	Number	Pos.	Height	Weight	Year	Hometown	Reason for departure
Dayson Youngblood	14	G	6'2"	195	Senior	South Jordan, UT	Graduated
Jamar Ergas	20	G	6'4"	205	Senior	Mansfield, TX	Graduated
Lleyton Parker	32	G	6'3"	195	Sophomore	South Jordan, UT	Left team
Mikey Frazier	42	F	6'11"	250	Freshman	Salt Lake City, UT	Left team
Jarod Greene	50	G/C	6'9"	255	Senior	Blackfoot, ID	Graduated

=== Incoming transfers ===
Name	Number	Pos.	Height	Weight	Year	Hometown	Previous school	Years remaining	Date eligible
Jamaal Barnes	5	G	6'2"	170	Sophomore	Moreno Valley, CA	MSJC	3	June 2, 2021
Dancell Leter	14	G	6'8"	195	Junior	Paramaribo, Suriname	Odessa College	2	April 21, 2021

== Roster ==
2020–21 Dixie State Trailblazers men's basketball team
Players
Coaches

Pos.	#	Name	Height	Weight	Year	Previous school	Hometown
G	1	Brock Gilbert	5 ft 10 in (1.78 m)	160 lb (73 kg)	Jr	Umpqua CC	Syracuse, Utah
F/C	2	Trey Edmonds	6 ft 9 in (2.06 m)	240 lb (109 kg)	Fr	George Washington HS	Denver, Colorado
G	3	Cameron Gooden	5 ft 11 in (1.8 m)	175 lb (79 kg)	Jr	Kilgore CC	Frisco, Texas
F	4	Andre Mulibea	6 ft 6 in (1.98 m)	210 lb (95 kg)	Fr	East HS	Salt Lake City, Utah
G	5	Jamaal Barnes	6 ft 2 in (1.88 m)	170 lb (77 kg)	So	MSJC	Moreno Valley, California
G	10	Hunter Bohls	6 ft 0 in (1.83 m)	165 lb (75 kg)	Fr	Centennial HS	Las Vegas, Nevada
G	11	Noa Gonsalves	6 ft 1 in (1.85 m)	170 lb (77 kg)	Fr	Lehi HS	Lehi, Utah
F	14	Dancell Leter	6 ft 8 in (2.03 m)	195 lb (88 kg)	Jr	Odessa JC	Paramaribo, Suriname
G	21	Isaiah Pope	6 ft 6 in (1.98 m)	200 lb (91 kg)	So	Humboldt State	Yorba Linda, California
G/F	22	Frank Staine	6 ft 6 in (1.98 m)	200 lb (91 kg)	So	St. Anthony HS	Inglewood, California
G	24	Jacob Nicolds	6 ft 5 in (1.96 m)	215 lb (98 kg)	Jr	Gilbert HS	Gilbert, Arizona
G	30	Chase Berry	6 ft 6 in (1.98 m)	225 lb (102 kg)	Sr	Boise State	Lehi, Utah
G	34	Emad Elniel	6 ft 6 in (1.98 m)	195 lb (88 kg)	Fr	Independence HS	Phoenix, Arizona
F	40	Trevon Allfrey	6 ft 7 in (2.01 m)	230 lb (104 kg)	RS Fr	Seattle	West Jordan, Utah
F	44	Hunter Schofield	6 ft 8 in (2.03 m)	225 lb (102 kg)	Sr	Salt Lake CC	Spanish Fork, Utah
G	54	Mark Hatch	6 ft 0 in (1.83 m)	180 lb (82 kg)	Jr	Scottsdale CC	Mesa, Arizona

Head coach

- Jon Judkins (Utah State)

Assistant coach(es)

- Jake Schroeder (Portland State)
- Andrew May (BYU)
- Anthony Morris (Washington)

Legend

- (C) Team captain
- (S) Suspended
- (I) Ineligible
- (W) Walk-on
- Injured
- Current redshirt

Roster
Last update: September 20, 2021

== Schedule and results ==
Date time, TV	Rank^{#}	Opponent^{#}	Result	Record	High points	High rebounds	High assists	Site (attendance) city, state
Non-conference regular season
November 9, 2021*; 7:00 pm, RSNW		at No. 1 Gonzaga	L 63–97	0–1	15 – Gooden	5 – Gonsalves	5 – Gooden	McCarthey Athletic Center (6,000); Spokane, WA
November 12, 2021*; 7:00 pm, ESPN+		Southern Utah	W 83–76	1–1	29 – Schofield	8 – Nicolds	9 – Gooden	Burns Arena (4,105); St. George, UT
November 19, 2021*; 12:00 pm		vs. Texas State; Empire Classic at CSUN	L 65–85	1–2	18 – Gooden	4 – Gooden	4 – Gooden	Matadome (75); Northridge, CA
November 20, 2021*; 12:00 pm		vs. Cal State Northridge; Empire Classic at CSUN	L 73–79	1–3	20 – Gooden	8 – Gooden	7 – Gilbert	Matadome (193); Northridge, CA
November 22, 2021*; 9:00 pm, P12N		at No. 24 USC	L 71–98	1–4	17 – Tied	8 – Schofield	4 – Tied	Galen Center (2,189); Los Angeles, CA
November 27, 2021*; 7:00 pm, ESPN+		Weber State	L 70–87	1–5	17 – Leter	8 – Leter	4 – Gooden	Burns Arena (2,352); St. George, UT
November 30, 2021*; 7:00 pm, ESPN+		Bethesda	W 99–61	2–5	18 – Schofield	10 – Allfrey	5 – Gooden	Burns Arena (1,501); St. George, UT
December 1, 2021*; 7:00 pm, ESPN+		Bethesda	W 99–67	3–5	18 – Gooden	10 – Schofield	6 – Gilbert	Burns Arena (1,672); St. George, UT
December 4, 2021*; 7:00 pm, ESPN+		St. Katherine	W 97–65	4–5	16 – Schofield	7 – Leter; Schofield	8 – Gilbert	Burns Arena (2,017); St. George, UT
December 11, 2021*; 7:00 pm, ESPN+		Denver	W 82–62	5–5	22 – Gooden	7 – Schofield	6 – Gooden	Burns Arena (1,276); St. George, UT
December 15, 2021*; 7:00 pm, ESPN+		SAGU American Indian College	W 114–49	6–5	16 – Gooden	8 – Edmonds	4 – Gooden	Burns Arena (512); St. George, UT
December 18, 2021*; 12:00 pm		at North Dakota	W 78–69	7–5	18 – Schofield	5 – Gonsalves	4 – Gilbert	Betty Engelstad Sioux Center (1,187); Grand Forks, ND
December 22, 2021*; 7:00 pm, ESPN+		at Southern Utah	L 59–87	7–6	13 – Leter	5 – Gonsalves	3 – Gooden	America First Event Center (2,638); Cedar City, UT
WAC regular season
December 30, 2021; 7:00 pm, ESPN+		Tarleton State	L 69–83	7–7 (0–1)	15 – Gooden	8 – Gooden	5 – Gilbert	Burns Arena (967); St. George, UT
January 1, 2022; 7:00 pm, ESPN+		Abilene Christian	L 50–64	7–8 (0–2)	15 – Leter	8 – Schofield	3 – Gilbert	Burns Arena (719); St. George, UT
January 8, 2022; 2:00 pm, ESPN+		at Utah Valley	L 71–79	7–9 (0–3)	15 – Staine	7 – Leter	2 – Tied	UCCU Center (2,523); Orem, UT
January 13, 2022; 8:00 pm, ESPN+		at California Baptist	W 79–76	8–9 (1–3)	26 – Gooden	10 – Schofield	4 – Tied	CBU Events Center (2,014); Riverside, CA
January 15, 2022; 2:00 pm, ESPN+		at Seattle	L 68–79	8–10 (1–4)	25 – Schofield	8 – Schofield	5 – Gooden	Redhawk Center (456); Seattle, WA
January 20, 2022; 7:00 pm, ESPN+		Lamar	W 71–55	9–10 (2–4)	22 – Schofield	12 – Schofield	4 – Gooden	Burns Arena (1,228); St. George, UT
January 22, 2022; 7:00 pm, ESPN+		UTRGV	W 85–74	10–10 (3–4)	22 – Schofield	10 – Staine	5 – Gooden	Burns Arena (1,560); St. George, UT
January 29, 2022; 1:00 pm, ESPN+		at Chicago State	W 79–65	11–10 (4–4)	23 – Schofield	11 – Leter	4 – Staine	Jones Convocation Center (119); Chicago, IL
February 3, 2022; 5:30 pm, ESPN+		at Sam Houston	L 53–77	11–11 (4–5)	15 – Schofield	7 – Schofield	6 – Gooden	Bernard Johnson Coliseum (426); Huntsville, TX
February 5, 2022; 1:00 pm, ESPN+		at Stephen F. Austin	L 52–81	11–2 (4–6)	13 – Leter	6 – Leter	3 – Gooden	William R. Johnson Coliseum (1,859); Nacogdoches, TX
February 10, 2022; 7:00 pm, ESPN+		New Mexico State	L 69–77	11–13 (4–7)	17 – Staine	5 – Staine	4 – Gooden	Burns Arena (1,333); St. George, UT
February 12, 2022; 7:00 pm, ESPN+		Grand Canyon	W 61–60	12–13 (5–7)	18 – Schofield	9 – Schofield	3 – Schofield	Burns Arena (1,898); St. George, UT
February 16, 2022; 7:00 pm, ESPN+		at New Mexico State	L 64–75	12–14 (5–8)	14 – Schofield	6 – Edmonds	3 – Schofield	Pan American Center (4,424); Las Cruces, NM
February 19, 2022; 7:00 pm, ESPN+		Utah Valley	W 80–75 ^{OT}	13–14 (6–8)	26 – Schofield	8 – Staine	4 – Gooden	Burns Arena (4,270); St. George, UT
February 24, 2022; 7:00 pm, ESPN+		California Baptist	L 61–71	13–15 (6–9)	26 – Schofield	11 – Schofield	3 – Tied	Burns Arena (1,269); St. George, UT
February 26, 2022; 7:00 pm, ESPN+		Seattle	L 65–73	13–16 (6–10)	15 – Gooden	9 – Schofield	4 – Gooden	Burns Arena (1,288); St. George, UT
March 3, 2022; 6:00 pm, ESPN+		at Abilene Christian	L 64–80	13–17 (6–11)	15 – Schofield	7 – Leter	4 – Gooden	Teague Center (829); Abilene, TX
March 5, 2022; 6:00 pm, ESPN+		at Grand Canyon	L 53–70	13–18 (6–12)	16 – Staine	11 – Schofield	4 – Gooden	GCU Arena (7,412); Phoenix, AZ
*Non-conference game. ^{#}Rankings from AP Poll. (#) Tournament seedings in parentheses. All times are in Mountain.

== See also ==
- 2021–22 Dixie State Trailblazers women's basketball team
