= 2021–22 Abilene Christian Wildcats men's basketball team =

American college basketball season

2021–22 Abilene Christian Wildcats men's basketball

CBI, semifinals
- Conference: Western Athletic Conference
- Record: 25–11 (11–7 WAC)
- Head coach: Brette Tanner (1st season)
- Associate head coach: Antonio Bostic
- Assistant coaches: Jon Trilli; Kyle Bankhead
- Home arena: Teague Special Events Center

2021–22 WAC men's basketball standings
	Conf.				Overall
Team	W		L	PCT	W		L	PCT
New Mexico State †	14	–	4	.778	27	–	7	.794
Seattle	14	–	4	.778	23	–	9	.719
Stephen F. Austin	14	–	4	.778	22	–	10	.688
Grand Canyon	13	–	5	.722	23	–	8	.742
Sam Houston State	13	–	5	.722	19	–	14	.576
Abilene Christian	11	–	7	.611	25	–	11	.694
Utah Valley	10	–	8	.556	20	–	12	.625
Tarleton State *	9	–	9	.500	14	–	17	.452
California Baptist *	7	–	11	.389	18	–	16	.529
Dixie State *	6	–	12	.333	13	–	17	.433
Texas–Rio Grande Valley	3	–	15	.167	8	–	23	.258
Chicago State	3	–	15	.167	7	–	25	.219
Lamar	0	–	18	.000	2	–	27	.069
† 2022 WAC tournament winner * ineligible for the 2022 NCAA tournament due to transition from NCAA Division II

The 2021–22 Abilene Christian Wildcats men's basketball team represented Abilene Christian University (ACU) in the 2021–22 NCAA Division I men's basketball season. The Wildcats, led by first-year head coach Brette Tanner, were first-year members of the Western Athletic Conference. Due to renovations at their usual home arena of Moody Coliseum, they played their home games on temporary stands and court set up on the indoor tennis courts of the Teague Special Events Center.

This season was the Wildcats' first season in the WAC. Abilene Christian and three other schools from Texas joined the conference on July 1, 2021 after leaving the Southland Conference.

== Previous season ==
In a season limited due to the ongoing COVID-19 pandemic, the Wildcats finished the 2020–21 season 24–5, 13–2 in Southland play to finish in second place. They received a bye to the semifinals of the Southland tournament where they defeated Lamar and Nicholls to win the tournament championship. As a result, they received the conference's automatic bid to the NCAA tournament as the No. 14 seed in the East region. There the Wildcats upset No. 9-ranked Texas in the first round. They lost to eventual Final Four participant UCLA in the second round.

== Roster ==
2021–22 Abilene Christian Wildcats men's basketball team
Players
Coaches

Pos.	#	Name	Height	Weight	Year	Previous school	Hometown
G	0	Ja'Sean Jackson	6 ft 0 in (1.83 m)	170 lb (77 kg)	Fr	Karen Wagner HS	San Antonio, TX
G	1	Logan McLaughlin	6 ft 1 in (1.85 m)	185 lb (84 kg)	So	Hebron HS (TX)	Carrollton, TX
F	3	Leonardo Bettiol	6 ft 8 in (2.03 m)	214 lb (97 kg)	Fr	Liceo Duca degli Abruzzi	Roncade, Italy
G	4	Damien Daniels	5 ft 7 in (1.7 m)	140 lb (64 kg)	Sr	Hogan Prep	Kansas City, MO
F	5	Cameron Steele	6 ft 8 in (2.03 m)	205 lb (93 kg)	So	Minnetonka HS	Excelsior, MN
G	10	Reggie Miller	6 ft 0 in (1.83 m)	150 lb (68 kg)	Sr	Seward County CC	Houston, TX
G	11	Tobias Cameron	6 ft 5 in (1.96 m)	210 lb (95 kg)	Sr	Hillcrest Christian Academy	Gold Coast, AUS
G	12	Mahki Morris	6 ft 3 in (1.91 m)	184 lb (83 kg)	Sr	Cochise Junior College	Philadelphia, PA
G	13	Stevie Smith	6 ft 6 in (1.98 m)	200 lb (91 kg)	Jr	College of Southern Idaho	Seattle, WA
F	15	Furaha Cadeux de Dieu	6 ft 8 in (2.03 m)	220 lb (100 kg)	Jr	New Mexico Military Institute	Kigali, Rwanda
G	20	Coryon Mason	6 ft 0 in (1.83 m)	190 lb (86 kg)	Sr	Ranger College	Oklahoma City, OK
F	21	Jameson Richardson	6 ft 8 in (2.03 m)	230 lb (104 kg)	So	Duke HS	Duke, OK
F	23	Airion Simmons	6 ft 5 in (1.96 m)	264 lb (120 kg)	Jr	Parkview Magnet HS	Little Rock, AR
G	25	Immanuel Allen	6 ft 4 in (1.93 m)	215 lb (98 kg)	Jr	Butler CC	Phoenix, AZ
F	34	Yuot Gai	6 ft 11 in (2.11 m)	210 lb (95 kg)	Jr	South Plains College	Melbourne, AUS

Head coach

- Brette Tanner (Emporia State)

Assistant coach(es)

- Antonio Bostic (Stephen F. Austin)
- Jon Trilli (Midwestern State)
- Kyle Bankhead (Gonzaga)

Legend

- (C) Team captain
- (S) Suspended
- (I) Ineligible
- (W) Walk-on
- Injured
- Current redshirt

Roster
Last update: December 1, 2021

== Schedule and results ==
Date time, TV	Rank^{#}	Opponent^{#}	Result	Record	Site (attendance) city, state
Non-conference Regular season
November 9, 2021*; 7:00 pm, PAC12		at Utah	L 56–70	0–1	Jon M. Huntsman Center (2,355); Salt Lake City, UT
November 12, 2021*; 7:00 pm, SECN+		at Texas A&M	L 80–81 ^{2OT}	0–2	Reed Arena (5,206); College Station, TX
November 16, 2021*; 7:00 pm, ESPN+		at UT Arlington	W 80–71 ^{OT}	1–2	College Park Center (1,480); Arlington, TX
November 27, 2021*; 6:00 pm, ESPN+		McMurry	W 89–54	2–2	Teague Center (414); Abilene, TX
November 29, 2021*; 7:00 pm, ESPN+		Schreiner	W 88–47	3–2	Teague Center (605); Abilene, TX
December 1, 2021*; 7:00 pm, ESPN+		Dallas	W 108–65	4–2	Teague Center (598); Abilene, TX
December 4, 2021*; 3:00 pm, ESPN+		Incarnate Word	W 98–65	5–2	Teague Center (842); Abilene, TX
December 11, 2021*; 6:00 pm, ESPN+		Drexel	W 73–56	6–2	Teague Center (603); Abilene, TX
December 15, 2021*; 7:30 pm, ESPN+		Cal State Bakersfield	W 69–59	7–2	Teague Center (513); Abilene, TX
December 19, 2021*; 3:00 pm, ESPN+		Howard Payne	W 112–41	8–2	Teague Center (1,000); Abilene, TX
December 22, 2021*; 7:00 pm, ESPN+		Longwood	W 74–58	9–2	Teague Center (474); Abilene, TX
WAC conference season
December 30, 2021; 7:00 pm, ESPN+		at Utah Valley	W 80–76	10–2 (1–0)	UCCU Center (1,472); Orem, UT
January 1, 2022; 8:00 pm, ESPN+		at Dixie State	W 64–50	11–2 (2–0)	Burns Arena (719); St. George, UT
January 6, 2022; 7:00 pm, ESPN+		Stephen F. Austin	L 58–64	11–3 (2–1)	Teague Center (807); Abilene, TX
January 8, 2022; 6:00 pm, ESPN+		Sam Houston State	L 63–65	11–4 (2–2)	Teague Center (1,098); Abilene, TX
January 13, 2022; 8:00 pm, ESPN+		at Grand Canyon	L 68–95	11–5 (2–3)	GCU Arena (6,815); Phoenix, AZ
January 15, 2022; 5:00 pm, ESPN+		at New Mexico State	L 63–77	11–6 (2–4)	Pan American Center (5,014); Las Cruces, NM
January 20, 2022; 7:00 pm, ESPN+		Seattle	L 62–72	11–7 (2–5)	Teague Center (1,179); Abilene, TX
January 22, 2022; 3:00 pm, ESPN+		California Baptist	W 77–68	12–7 (3–5)	Teague Center (726); Abilene, TX
January 26, 2022; 7:00 pm, ESPN+		at Texas–Rio Grande Valley	W 87–85	13–7 (4–5)	UTRGV Fieldhouse (713); Edinburg, TX
January 29, 2022; 3:00 pm, ESPN+		at Lamar	W 85–82	14–7 (5–5)	Montagne Center (2,487); Beaumont, TX
February 2, 2022; 7:00 pm, ESPN+		Chicago State	W 77–73	15–7 (6–5)	Teague Center (444); Abilene, TX
February 5, 2022; 3:00 pm, ESPN+		Texas–Rio Grande Valley	W 83–66	16–7 (7–5)	Teague Center (1,088); Abilene, TX
February 12, 2022; 7:00 pm, ESPN+		at Tarleton State	W 77–63	17–7 (8–5)	Wisdom Gymnasium (2,884); Stephenville, TX
February 17, 2022; 6:30 pm, ESPN+		at Sam Houston State	L 71–75 ^{OT}	17–8 (8–6)	Johnson Coliseum (382); Huntsville, TX
February 24, 2022; 7:00 pm, ESPN+		Lamar	W 77–42	18–8 (9–6)	Teague Center (928); Abilene, TX
February 26, 2022; 4:00 pm, ESPN+		at Stephen F. Austin	L 71–73	18–9 (9–7)	William R. Johnson Coliseum (2,580); Nacogdoches, TX
March 3, 2022; 7:00 pm, ESPN+		Dixie State	W 80–64	19–9 (10–7)	Teague Center (829); Abilene, TX
March 5, 2022; 6:00 pm, ESPN+		Tarleton State	W 61–56	20–9 (11–7)	Teague Center (1,213); Abilene, TX
WAC tournament
March 9, 2022; 8:00 pm, ESPN+	(6)	vs. (7) Utah Valley; Second round	W 82–74	21–9	Orleans Arena (1,136); Paradise, NV
March 10, 2022; 8:30 pm, ESPN+	(6)	vs. (3) Stephen F. Austin; Third round	W 76–62	22–9	Orleans Arena (2,623); Paradise, NV
March 11, 2022; 8:30 pm, ESPN+	(6)	vs. (2) Seattle; Semifinals	W 78–76	23–9	Orleans Arena (2,730); Paradise, NV
March 12, 2022; 7:00 pm, ESPNU	(6)	vs. (1) New Mexico State; Championship	L 52–66	23–10	Orleans Arena (3,697); Paradise, NV
CBI
March 20, 2022; 6:00 pm, FloHoops	(6)	vs. (11) Troy; First Round	W 82–70	24–10	Ocean Center (762); Daytona Beach, FL
March 21, 2022; 6:30 pm, FloHoops	(6)	vs. (3) Ohio; Quarterfinals	W 91–86	25–10	Ocean Center (706); Daytona Beach, FL
March 22, 2022; 8:30 pm, ESPN2	(6)	vs. (2) Middle Tennessee; Semifinals	L 69–85	25–11	Ocean Center (633); Daytona Beach, FL
*Non-conference game. ^{#}Rankings from AP Poll. (#) Tournament seedings in parentheses. All times are in Central.

== See also ==
2021–22 Abilene Christian Wildcats women's basketball team
