= 2021–22 Lamar Cardinals basketball team =

American college basketball season

2021–22 Lamar Cardinals basketball
- Conference: Western Athletic Conference
- Record: 2–27 (0–18 WAC)
- Head coach: Alvin Brooks (1st season)
- Assistant coaches: Charles Harral (1st season); Wendell Moore (1st season); Mikhail McLean (1st season)
- Home arena: Montagne Center (Capacity: 10,080)

2021–22 WAC men's basketball standings
	Conf.				Overall
Team	W		L	PCT	W		L	PCT
New Mexico State †	14	–	4	.778	27	–	7	.794
Seattle	14	–	4	.778	23	–	9	.719
Stephen F. Austin	14	–	4	.778	22	–	10	.688
Grand Canyon	13	–	5	.722	23	–	8	.742
Sam Houston State	13	–	5	.722	19	–	14	.576
Abilene Christian	11	–	7	.611	25	–	11	.694
Utah Valley	10	–	8	.556	20	–	12	.625
Tarleton State *	9	–	9	.500	14	–	17	.452
California Baptist *	7	–	11	.389	18	–	16	.529
Dixie State *	6	–	12	.333	13	–	17	.433
Texas–Rio Grande Valley	3	–	15	.167	8	–	23	.258
Chicago State	3	–	15	.167	7	–	25	.219
Lamar	0	–	18	.000	2	–	27	.069
† 2022 WAC tournament winner * ineligible for the 2022 NCAA tournament due to transition from NCAA Division II

The 2021–22 Lamar Cardinals basketball team represented Lamar University during the 2021–22 NCAA Division I men's basketball season. The Cardinals were led by first-year head coach Alvin Brooks and played their home games at the Montagne Center in Beaumont, Texas as members of the first-year members of the Western Athletic Conference.

The school announced on January 14, 2021, that the Cardinals would leave the Southland Conference to join the WAC for the 2021–22 season.

== Previous season ==
In a season limited due to the ongoing COVID-19 pandemic, the Cardinals finished the 2020–21 season 10–18, 6–10 in Southland play to finish seventh place. In the Southland tournament, the Cardinals defeated Houston Baptist and Sam Houston State before losing to Abilene Christian in the semifinals.

Following the season, the school announced that head coach Tic Price would not be retained. Shortly thereafter, Alvin Brooks, previously an assistant coach at Houston, was named the new head coach

== Offseason ==
=== Coaching changes ===
New assistants, Charles Harral, Mikhail McClean, Wendell Moore, and Aaron Proctor, were added to the staff.

=== Departures ===
Lamar Departures
Name	Number	Pos.	Height	Weight	Year	Hometown	Reason for Departure
David Muoka	0	C	6'10"	211	Sophomore	Hong Kong China	Transferred to UNLV
Quinlan Bennett	1	G	6'3"	205	Junior	Chicago, IL	Transferred to Western Illinois
Tarig Eisa	2	F	6'8"	202	Junior	Toronto Ontario Canada	Left team
Avery Sullivan	5	F	6'8"	237	Senior	Pflugerville, TX	Completed eligibility
Anderson Kopp	11	G	6'6"	205	Sophomore	Houston, TX	Transferred to Kansas City
Anthony Cameron	25	F	6'8"	330	Senior	Chicago, IL	Completed eligibility

=== Incoming transfers ===
Lamar incoming transfers
Name	Number	Pos.	Height	Weight	Year	Hometown	Previous School
Jordyn Adams	5	G	6'3"	200	Junior	Silsbee, TX	Austin Peay
Xavier Ball	11	F	6'6"	230	Junior	Winnfield, LA	John A. Logan College
Valentin Catt	12	F	6'10"	220	Sophomore	Orangefield, TX	South Plains College
CJ Roberts	20	G	6'1"	190	Junior	North Richland Hills, TX	New Mexico State

== Roster ==
2021–22 Lamar Cardinals men's basketball team
Players
Coaches

Pos.	#	Name	Height	Weight	Year	Hometown
F	0	Lincoln Smith	6 ft 5 in (1.96 m)	198 lb (90 kg)	Sr	Columbus, Georgia
G	1	Bryan Gordon	6 ft 2 in (1.88 m)	170 lb (77 kg)	Fr	Houston, Texas
G	2	Avontez Ledet	6 ft 2 in (1.88 m)	170 lb (77 kg)	Fr	Breaux Bridge, Louisiana
G	3	Ellis Jefferson	6 ft 0 in (1.83 m)	195 lb (88 kg)	Sr	San Antonio, Texas
G	4	Kasen Harrison	6 ft 1 in (1.85 m)	190 lb (86 kg)	So	Beaumont, Texas
G	5	Jordyn Adams	6 ft 3 in (1.91 m)	200 lb (91 kg)	Jr	Silsbee, Texas
G	10	Trey Harris	6 ft 5 in (1.96 m)	180 lb (82 kg)	Fr	Houston, Texas
F	11	Xavier Ball	6 ft 6 in (1.98 m)	230 lb (104 kg)	Jr	Winnfield, Louisiana
C	12	Valentin Catt	6 ft 10 in (2.08 m)	220 lb (100 kg)	So	Orangefield, Texas
G	13	Davion Buster	5 ft 10 in (1.78 m)	169 lb (77 kg)	Sr	Austin, Texas
F	14	Corey Nickerson	6 ft 7 in (2.01 m)	191 lb (87 kg)	Jr	Houston, Texas
F	15	Deiman Reyes	6 ft 8 in (2.03 m)	225 lb (102 kg)	Fr	Barranquilla Colombia
G	20	C.J. Roberts	6 ft 1 in (1.85 m)	190 lb (86 kg)	Sr	Irving, Texas
G	21	Ayaan Sohail	6 ft 3 in (1.91 m)	182 lb (83 kg)	Jr	El Paso, Texas
G	22	Casey Brooks	5 ft 9 in (1.75 m)	159 lb (72 kg)	So	Kingsville, Texas
F	23	Mason Senigaur	6 ft 6 in (1.98 m)	185 lb (84 kg)	Jr	Beaumont, Texas
G/F	24	Brock McClure	6 ft 6 in (1.98 m)	195 lb (88 kg)	Fr	Lumberton, Texas
F	35	Clayton Carpenter	6 ft 9 in (2.06 m)	216 lb (98 kg)	Fr	Beaumont, Texas

Head coach

- Alvin Brooks (Lamar)

Assistant coach(es)

- Charles Harral (Texas Tech)
- Wendell Moore (Georgia Southern)
- Mikhail McClean (Houston)

Legend

- (C) Team captain
- (S) Suspended
- (I) Ineligible
- (W) Walk-on
- Injured
- Current redshirt

Roster
Last update: October 16, 2021

== TV and radio media ==
All Lamar games will be broadcast on KLVI, also known as News Talk 560.

Live video of all home games will be broadcast on ESPN platforms.

== Schedule and results ==
Date time, TV	Rank^{#}	Opponent^{#}	Result	Record	High points	High rebounds	High assists	Site (attendance) city, state
Exhibition
November 3, 2021*; 6:00 pm, ESPN+		St. Thomas (TX)	W 88–56		18 – Roberts	11 – Smith	7 – Harrison	Montagne Center; Beaumont, TX
Non-conference regular season
November 9, 2021*; 7:00 pm, ESPN+		Wiley College	W 67–50	1–0	15 – Adams	9 – Harrison	8 – Harrison	Montagne Center (2,586); Beaumont, TX
November 13, 2021*; 1:00 pm, ESPN3		at Miami (OH)	L 75–104	1–1	15 – Ledet	7 – McClure	4 – Buster	Millett Hall (1,163); Oxford, OH
November 15, 2021*; 6:30 pm, ESPN+		at Georgia Tech	L 66–75	1–2	17 – Adams	5 – Roberts	4 – Tied	McCamish Pavilion (3,625); Atlanta, GA
November 19, 2021*; 7:00 pm, ESPN+		Stetson	L 59–60	1–3	15 – Adams	8 – Smith	5 – Harrison	Montagne Center (3,532); Beaumont, TX
November 21, 2021*; 2:00 pm		at Southern Miss	L 75–82	1–4	14 – Roberts	6 – Roberts	4 – Tied	Reed Green Coliseum (3,037); Hattiesburg, MS
November 24, 2021*; 2:00 pm		at UTSA	L 73–79	1–5	22 – Buster	13 – Catt	5 – Ellis	Convocation Center (758); San Antonio, TX
November 27, 2021*; 3:00 pm		at Texas Tech	L 57–89	1–6	20 – Tied	3 – Jefferson	4 – Roberts	United Supermarkets Arena (12,223); Lubbock, TX
December 2, 2021*; 7:00 pm, SECN+		at Mississippi State	L 60–75	1–7	25 – Roberts	6 – Tied	4 – Jefferson	Humphrey Coliseum (5,981); Starkville, MS
December 5, 2021*; 3:00 pm, ESPN+		Our Lady of the Lake	W 67–64	2–7	23 – Roberts	13 – Smith	4 – Jefferson	Montagne Center (1,512); Beaumont, TX
December 11, 2021*; 2:00 pm, ESPN+		at UT Arlington	L 47–56	2–8	21 – Buster	10 – Smith	2 – Catt	College Park Center (1,306); Arlington, TX
December 15, 2021*; 7:00 pm		at Texas State	L 47–67	2–9	11 – Harrison	11 – Smith	2 – Harrison	Strahan Coliseum (1,059); San Marcos, TX
December 18, 2021*; 12:00 pm, ESPN+		at Texas A&M–Corpus Christi	L 53–57	2–10	14 – Harrison	11 – Seniguar	3 – Seniguar	Dugan Wellness Center (816); Corpus Christi, TX
December 20, 2021*; 7:00 pm, ESPN+		Louisiana–Monroe	L 77–80	2–11	21 – Adams	11 – Nickerson	6 – Harrison	Montagne Center (1,543); Beaumont, TX
WAC regular season
December 30, 2021; 6:30 pm, ESPN+		at Sam Houston State	L 65–74	2–12 (0–1)	20 – Smith	9 – Nickerson	4 – Jefferson	Bernard Johnson Coliseum (214); Huntsville, TX
January 6, 2022; 7:00 pm, ESPN+		New Mexico State	L 0–2 (Forfeit)	2–12 (0–2)	– -	– -	– -	Montagne Center; Beaumont, TX
January 8, 2022; 3:00 pm, ESPN+		Grand Canyon	L 0–2 (Forfeit)	2–12 (0–3)	– -	– -	– -	Montagne Center; Beaumont, TX
January 13, 2022; 7:00 pm, ESPN+		Sam Houston State	L 56–73	2–13 (0–4)	22 – Roberts	6 – McClure	2 – Tied	Montagne Center (1,712); Beaumont, TX
January 15, 2022; 3:00 pm, ESPN+		Chicago State	L 56–67	2–14 (0–5)	16 – Harrison	10 – McClure	4 – Roberts	Montagne Center (1,582); Beaumont, TX
January 17, 2022; 6:30 pm, ESPN+		at Stephen F. Austin; Rescheduled from Jan. 1	L 78–86	2–15 (0–6)	20 – Roberts	7 – McClure	4 – Smith	William R. Johnson Coliseum (1,703); Nacogdoches, TX
January 20, 2022; 8:00 pm, ESPN+		at Dixie State	L 55–71	2–16 (0–7)	14 – Smith	9 – Carpenter	3 – Roberts	Burns Arena (1,712); St. George, UT
January 22, 2022; 3:00 pm, ESPN+		at Utah Valley	L 41–58	2–17 (0–8)	11 – Smith	8 – Smith	3 – Jefferson	UCCU Center (1,511); Orem, UT
January 26, 2022; 7:00 pm, ESPN+		Tarleton State	L 57–62	2–18 (0–9)	14 – McClure	12 – Smith	6 – Harrison	Montagne Center (2,116); Beaumont, TX
January 29, 2022; 7:00 pm, ESPN+		Abilene Christian	L 82–85	2–19 (0–10)	19 – Harrison	8 – Smith	4 – Harrison	Montagne Center (2,487); Beaumont, TX
February 2, 2022; 7:00 pm, ESPN+		Texas–Rio Grande Valley	L 79–93	2–20 (0–11)	26 – Roberts	7 – Smith	5 – Adams	Montagne Center (818); Beaumont, TX
February 10, 2022; 9:00 pm, ESPN+		at California Baptist	L 61–83	2–21 (0–12)	16 – Roberts	10 – Smith	5 – Roberts	CBU Events Center (2,436); Riverside, CA
February 12, 2022; 3:00 pm, ESPN+		at Seattle	L 50–76	2–22 (0–13)	16 – Smith	10 – McClure	4 – Smith	Redhawk Center (592); Seattle, WA
February 19, 2022; 3:00 pm, ESPN+		Stephen F. Austin	L 56–70	2–23 (0–14)	18 – Roberts	7 – Nickerson	4 – Roberts	Montagne Center (2,896); Beaumont, TX
February 24, 2022; 7:00 pm, ESPN+		at Abilene Christian	L 42–77	2–24 (0–15)	11 – Nickerson	8 – McClure	1 – Tied	Teague Center (928); Abilene, TX
February 26, 2022; 7:00 pm, ESPN+		at Tarleton State	L 49–57	2–25 (0–16)	13 – McClure	10 – McClure	3 – Catt	Wisdom Gymnasium (1,763); Stephen, TX
March 2, 2022; 7:00 pm, ESPN+		at Texas–Rio Grande Valley	L 63–67	2–26 (0–17)	12 – McClure	8 – Nickerson	5 – Adams	UTRGV Fieldhouse (2,122); Edinburg, TX
March 5, 2022; 3:00 pm, ESPN+		California Baptist	L 66–78	2–27 (0–18)	15 – Smith	7 – Nickerson	3 – Tied	Montagne Center (2,345); Beaumont, TX
*Non-conference game. ^{#}Rankings from AP Poll. (#) Tournament seedings in parentheses. All times are in Central Time.

== See also ==
2021–22 Lamar Lady Cardinals basketball team
