= 2021–22 Stephen F. Austin Lumberjacks basketball team =

American college basketball season

2021–22 Stephen F. Austin Lumberjacks basketball

WAC regular season co-champions

CBI, First Round
- Conference: Western Athletic Conference
- Record: 22–10 (14–4 WAC)
- Head coach: Kyle Keller (6th season)
- Associate head coach: Tony Jasick
- Assistant coaches: Dalonte Hill; Tanner Smith
- Home arena: William R. Johnson Coliseum (Capacity: 7,203)

2021–22 WAC men's basketball standings
	Conf.				Overall
Team	W		L	PCT	W		L	PCT
New Mexico State †	14	–	4	.778	27	–	7	.794
Seattle	14	–	4	.778	23	–	9	.719
Stephen F. Austin	14	–	4	.778	22	–	10	.688
Grand Canyon	13	–	5	.722	23	–	8	.742
Sam Houston State	13	–	5	.722	19	–	14	.576
Abilene Christian	11	–	7	.611	25	–	11	.694
Utah Valley	10	–	8	.556	20	–	12	.625
Tarleton State *	9	–	9	.500	14	–	17	.452
California Baptist *	7	–	11	.389	18	–	16	.529
Dixie State *	6	–	12	.333	13	–	17	.433
Texas–Rio Grande Valley	3	–	15	.167	8	–	23	.258
Chicago State	3	–	15	.167	7	–	25	.219
Lamar	0	–	18	.000	2	–	27	.069
† 2022 WAC tournament winner * ineligible for the 2022 NCAA tournament due to transition from NCAA Division II

The 2021–22 Stephen F. Austin Lumberjacks basketball team represented Stephen F. Austin State University (SFA) during the 2021–22 NCAA Division I men's basketball season. The Lumberjacks, led by sixth-year head coach Kyle Keller, played their home games at the William R. Johnson Coliseum in Nacogdoches, Texas. This season was the Lumberjacks' first as members of the Western Athletic Conference; SFA was one of four schools, all from Texas, that left the Southland Conference in July 2021 joining the WAC.

== Previous season ==
The Lumberjacks finished the 2020–21 season 16–5, 12–3 in Southland Conference play to finish in fourth place. They did not participate in the Southland tournament due to a postseason ban for low APR scores. This season was the Lumberjacks' last as members of the Southland Conference, as they joined the Western Athletic Conference for the 2021–22 season.

== Roster ==
2021–22 Stephen F. Austin Lumberjacks men's basketball team
Players
Coaches

Pos.	#	Name	Height	Weight	Year	Hometown
G	0	Nigel Hawkins	6 ft 4 in (1.93 m)	191 lb (87 kg)	Jr	Houston, Texas
G	1	Derrick Tezeno	6 ft 5 in (1.96 m)	—	Fr	Melville, Louisiana
F	2	Jonathan Aku	6 ft 10 in (2.08 m)	—	So	Kaduna, Nigeria
F	3	Sadaidriene Hall	6 ft 5 in (1.96 m)	—	Fr	Sulphur Springs, Texas
G	4	David Kachelries	6 ft 1 in (1.85 m)	170 lb (77 kg)	Sr	Emmaus, Pennsylvania
G	5	Jaylin Jackson-Posey	6 ft 2 in (1.88 m)	196 lb (89 kg)	Fr	Midland, Texas
G	10	Latrell Jossell	5 ft 11 in (1.8 m)	—	Fr	Chicago, Illinois
F	13	Calvin Solomon	6 ft 7 in (2.01 m)	194 lb (88 kg)	So	Houston, Texas
F	14	Gavin Kensmil	6 ft 7 in (2.01 m)	260 lb (118 kg)	Sr	Paramaribo, Suriname
G	21	Russell Hyman	6 ft 1 in (1.85 m)	168 lb (76 kg)	So	Southlake, Texas
F	22	Nana Antwi-Boasiako	6 ft 9 in (2.06 m)	220 lb (100 kg)	Fr	Nacogdoches, Texas
G	23	Roti Ware	6 ft 3 in (1.91 m)	187 lb (85 kg)	Sr	Morton, Mississippi
G	24	Jimel Cofer	6 ft 3 in (1.91 m)	182 lb (83 kg)	Fr	Lansing, Michigan
G	25	Diego Willis	6 ft 4 in (1.93 m)	180 lb (82 kg)	Sr	Hermosillo, Mexico

Head coach

- Kyle Keller (Louisiana Tech)

Assistant coach(es)

- Tony Jasick (Mars Hill)
- Dalonte Hill (Charlotte)
- Tanner Smith (Clemson)

Legend

- (C) Team captain
- (S) Suspended
- (I) Ineligible
- (W) Walk-on
- Injured
- Current redshirt

Roster
Last update: February 9, 2022

== Schedule ==
Date time, TV	Rank^{#}	Opponent^{#}	Result	Record	Site (attendance) city, state
Non-conference Regular season
November 9, 2021*; 6:30 pm, ESPN+		LSU–Alexandria	W 82–73	1–0	William R. Johnson Coliseum (1,442); Nacogdoches, TX
November 11, 2021*; 6:30 pm, ESPN+		Mary Hardin–Baylor	W 76–63	2–0	William R. Johnson Coliseum (1,537); Nacogdoches, TX
November 14, 2021*; 2:00 pm, ESPN+		South Dakota State	L 71–83	2–1	William R. Johnson Coliseum (1,878); Nacogdoches, TX
November 19, 2021*; 6:30 pm, ESPN+		Middle Tennessee; Cancún Challenge campus-site game	W 87–74	3–1	William R. Johnson Coliseum (1,901); Nacogdoches, TX
November 23, 2021*; 5:00 pm, CBSSN		vs. Buffalo; Cancún Challenge Riviera semifinal	W 79–78	4–1	Hard Rock Hotel (103); Riviera Maya, Mexico
November 24, 2021*; 7:30 pm, CBSSN		vs. Saint Louis; Cancún Challenge Riviera championship	L 68–79	4–2	Hard Rock Hotel (461); Riviera Maya, Mexico
November 28, 2021*; 3:00 pm, NSUDemons.com		at Northwestern State	W 72–68	5–2	Prather Coliseum (1,005); Natchitoches, LA
December 1, 2021*; 6:30 pm, ESPN+		Lincoln (CA)	W 90–54	6–2	William R. Johnson Coleseum (1,702); Nacogdoches, TX
December 4, 2021*; 2:00 pm, ESPN+		Wiley	W 100–76	7–2	William R. Johnson Coleseum (1,431); Nacogdoches, TX
December 11, 2021*; 6:00 pm, FloSports		vs. Liberty; Hall of Fame Classic	W 73–51	8–2	Dickies Arena; Fort Worth, TX
December 14, 2021*; 6:30 pm, ESPN+		Louisiana–Monroe	L 69–82	8–3	William R. Johnson Coliseum (1,550); Nacogdoches, TX
December 18, 2021*; 7:00 pm, Big 12 Now		at No. 7 Kansas	L 72–80	8–4	Allen Fieldhouse (16,300); Lawrence, KS
December 21, 2021*; 2:00 pm, ESPN+		Jackson State	Canceled due to COVID-19 protocols at Jackson State		William R. Johnson Coliseum; Nacogdoches, TX
WAC Conference season
January 6, 2022; 7:00 pm, ESPN+		at Abilene Christian	W 64–58	9–4 (1–0)	Teague Center (807); Abilene, TX
January 8, 2022; 7:00 pm, ESPN+		at Tarleton State	L 71–77 ^{OT}	9–5 (1–1)	Wisdom Gymnasium (2,022); Stephenville, TX
January 11, 2022; 6:30 pm, ESPN+		Texas–Rio Grande Valley; Rescheduled from December 30	W 86–75	10–5 (2–1)	William R. Johnson Coliseum (1,709); Nacogdoches, TX
January 15, 2022; 2:00 pm, ESPN+		at Sam Houston State	L 41–49	10–6 (2–2)	Bernard Johnson Coliseum (1,114); Huntsville, TX
January 17, 2022; 6:30 pm, ESPN+		Lamar; Rescheduled from January 1	W 86–78	11–6 (3–2)	William R. Johnson Coliseum (1,703); Nacogdoches, TX
January 20, 2022; 6:30 pm, ESPN+		Grand Canyon	W 71–46	12–6 (4–2)	William R. Johnson Coliseum (2,304); Nacogdoches, TX
January 22, 2022; 2:00 pm, ESPN+		New Mexico State	L 58–72	12–7 (4–3)	William R. Johnson Coliseum (2,551); Nacogdoches, TX
January 26, 2022; 9:00 pm, ESPN+		at Seattle	L 62–70	12–8 (4–4)	Climate Pledge Arena (1,621); Seattle, WA
January 29, 2022; 9:00 pm, ESPN+		at California Baptist	W 81–77	13–8 (5–4)	CBU Events Center (4,311); Riverside, CA
February 3, 2022; 6:30 pm, ESPN+		Utah Valley	W 78–59	14–8 (6–4)	William R. Johnson Coliseum; Nacogdoches, TX
February 5, 2022; 2:00 pm, ESPN+		Dixie State	W 81–52	15–8 (7–4)	William R. Johnson Coliseum (1,859); Nacogdoches, TX
February 10, 2022; 7:00 pm, ESPN+		at Chicago State	W 81–61	16–8 (8–4)	Jones Convocation Center (142); Chicago, IL
February 16, 2022; 6:30 pm, ESPN+		Chicago State	W 88–71	17–8 (9–4)	William R. Johnson Coliseum (1,524); Nacogdoches, TX
February 19, 2022; 3:00 pm, ESPN+		at Lamar	W 70–56	18–8 (10–4)	Montagne Center (2,896); Beaumont, TX
February 24, 2022; 6:30 pm, ESPN+		Sam Houston State	W 69–67	19–8 (11–4)	William R. Johnson Coliseum (2,353); Nacogdoches, TX
February 26, 2022; 2:00 pm, ESPN+		Abilene Christian	W 73–71	20–8 (12–4)	William R. Johnson Coliseum (2,580); Nacogdoches, TX
March 2, 2022; 8:00 pm, ESPN+		at New Mexico State	W 73–71	21–8 (13–4)	Pan American Center (5,611); Las Cruces, NM
March 5, 2022; 7:00 pm, ESPN+		at Texas–Rio Grande Valley	W 93–63	22–8 (14–4)	UTRGV Fieldhouse (974); Edinburg, TX
WAC tournament
March 10, 2022; 8:30 pm, ESPN+	(3)	vs. (6) Abilene Christian; Third round	L 62–76	22–9	Orleans Arena (2,623); Paradise, NV
CBI
March 19, 2022; 1:30 pm, FloSports	(4)	vs. (13) UNC Asheville; First Round	L 68–80	22–10	Ocean Center (588); Daytona Beach, FL
*Non-conference game. ^{#}Rankings from AP Poll. (#) Tournament seedings in parentheses. All times are in Central Time.

== See also ==
- 2021–22 Stephen F. Austin Ladyjacks basketball team
