= Bert Ogden Arena =

Indoor arena in Edinburg, Texas

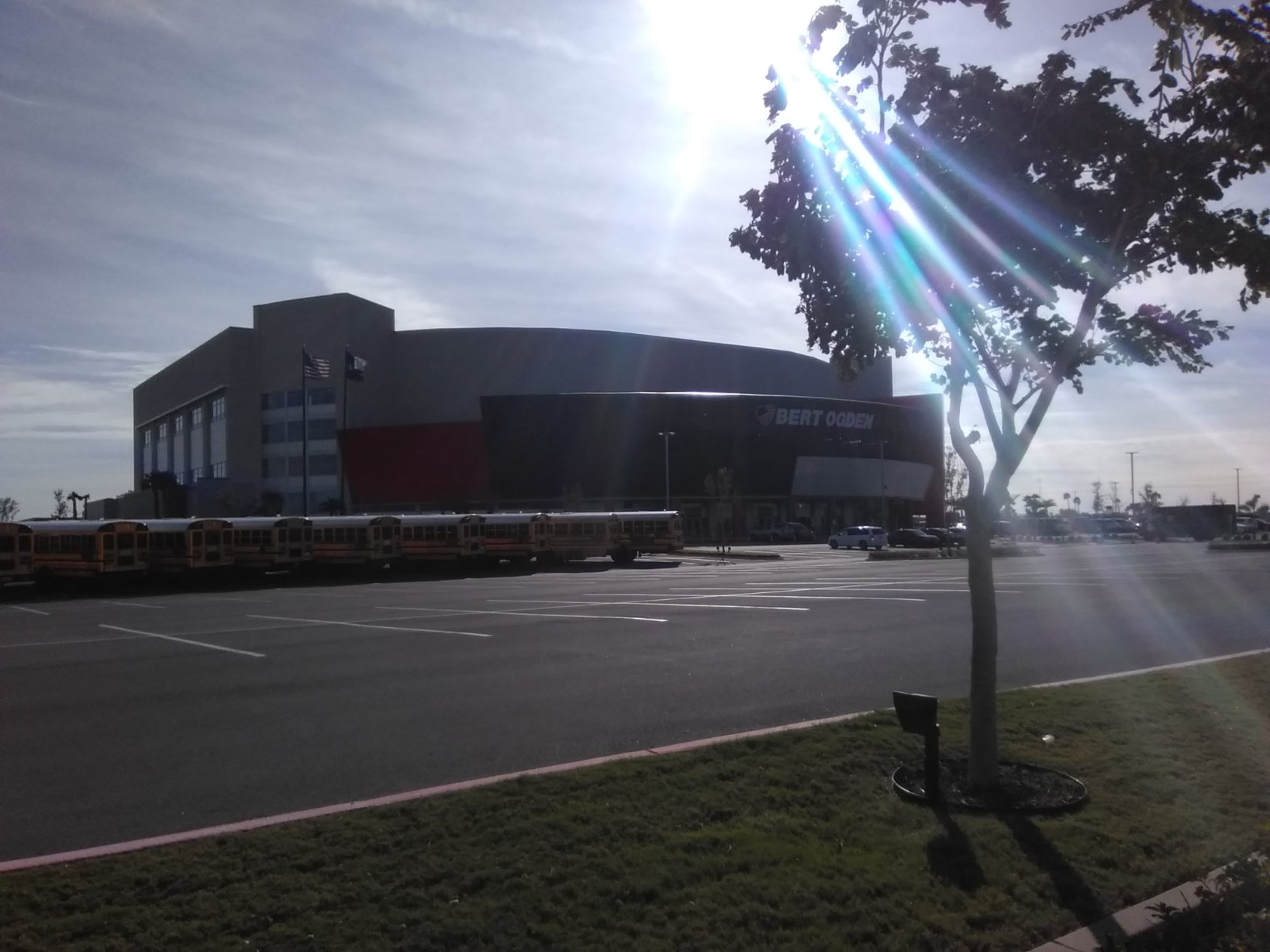

- Location within Texas Location within the United States
- Former names: New Edinburg Arena (planning/construction)
- Address: 4900 S I-69 C
- Location: Edinburg, Texas, U.S.
- Coordinates: 26.256568°N 98.164631°W
- Owner: City of Edinburg
- Operator: Golden Grape Entertainment
- Capacity: 7,688

Construction
- Groundbreaking: February 27, 2015; 11 years ago
- Opened: August 27, 2018; 8 years ago
- Cost: $88.3 million
- Architect: Cantu Construction

Tenant
- Rio Grande Valley Vipers (NBAGL) (2018–present)

Website
- bertogdenarena.com

The Bert Ogden Arena is an indoor arena in Edinburg, Texas, United States. The arena officially opened in August 2018 and currently houses the Rio Grande Valley Vipers, the NBA G League affiliate of the Houston Rockets. The arena seats nearly 7,700, which can be expanded up to a maximum capacity of 9,000 for concerts.

== Location and design ==
The arena is located just off the I-69C highway and is 5 miles northwest of downtown McAllen, Texas in the Rio Grande Valley region.

The arena was mainly built for basketball to replace the former home of the Rio Grande Valley Vipers at Payne Arena; but it also hosts concerts and other indoor events. It boasts a 40 x 20 foot LED video scoreboard and wrap-around ribbon board, Wi-Fi, and concourse TVs.

== History ==
The arena held its first event on August 31, 2018, featuring Latin music artist Luis Miguel.

Additional opening events featured AEW, WWE Live, J Balvin, Romeo Santos, George Lopez and Marc Anthony.

In addition to being the current home of the Rio Grande Valley Vipers, the Bert Ogden Arena also served as one of the temporary home arenas for the Capitanes de la Ciudad de México during their inaugural season at the NBA G League despite also being temporarily stationed at Fort Worth, Texas at the time due to the long-term effects of the COVID-19 pandemic. The Capitanes would later lose both of their home games to the original G League home team in question, the Rio Grande Valley Vipers.
