= 2021–22 Seattle Redhawks men's basketball team =

American college basketball season

2021–22 Seattle Redhawks men's basketball

WAC regular season co-champions
- Conference: Western Athletic Conference
- Record: 23–9 (14–4 WAC)
- Head coach: Chris Victor (1st season)
- Assistant coaches: Alex Pribble; D'Marques Tyson
- Home arena: Climate Pledge Arena; Redhawk Center

2021–22 WAC men's basketball standings
	Conf.				Overall
Team	W		L	PCT	W		L	PCT
New Mexico State †	14	–	4	.778	27	–	7	.794
Seattle	14	–	4	.778	23	–	9	.719
Stephen F. Austin	14	–	4	.778	22	–	10	.688
Grand Canyon	13	–	5	.722	23	–	8	.742
Sam Houston State	13	–	5	.722	19	–	14	.576
Abilene Christian	11	–	7	.611	25	–	11	.694
Utah Valley	10	–	8	.556	20	–	12	.625
Tarleton State *	9	–	9	.500	14	–	17	.452
California Baptist *	7	–	11	.389	18	–	16	.529
Dixie State *	6	–	12	.333	13	–	17	.433
Texas–Rio Grande Valley	3	–	15	.167	8	–	23	.258
Chicago State	3	–	15	.167	7	–	25	.219
Lamar	0	–	18	.000	2	–	27	.069
† 2022 WAC tournament winner * ineligible for the 2022 NCAA tournament due to transition from NCAA Division II

The 2021–22 Seattle Redhawks men's basketball team represented Seattle University during the 2021–22 NCAA Division I men's basketball season. The Redhawks, led by first-year head coach Chris Victor, competed as members of the Western Athletic Conference. They played their home games at the on-campus Redhawk Center and the recently renovated Climate Pledge Arena.

== Previous season ==
The Redhawks finished the 2020–21 season 12–11, 4–5 WAC play to finish in fifth place. They defeated California Baptist in the quarterfinals of the WAC tournament before losing to Grand Canyon in the semifinals.

== Offseason ==
=== Departures ===
Name	Number	Pos.	Height	Weight	Year	Hometown	Reason for departure
Trey Hopkins	2	G	6'3"	180	Junior	Midwest City, OK	Left the team for personal reasons
Angelo Stuart	13	G	6'1	165	Sophomore	Queens, NY	Transferred to Hutchinson CC
Daron Henson	23	F	6'8"	205	GS Senior	Pasadena, CA	Left the team due personal reasons
Jared Pearre	25	F	6'8"	205	RS Freshman	McKinney, TX	Transferred
Tiago Zibecchi	30	G	6'6"	200	RS Junior	Rio de Janeiro, Brazil	Walk-on; left the team for personal reasons
Robert Hutchens	31	G	6'4"	190	Freshman	Arroyo Granede, CA	Walk-on; transferred to Northern Arizona

=== Incoming transfers ===
Name	Number	Pos.	Height	Weight	Year	Hometown	Previous School
Cameron Tyson	5	G	6'2"	190	RS Junior	Bothell, WA	Houston
Brandon Chatfield	25	F	6'10"	210	RS Sophomore	Clarkston, WA	Washington State

=== Recruiting class of 2021 ===
College recruiting information
Name	Hometown	School	Height	Weight	Commit date
Brody Nunn; PG	Melbourne, Australia	Haileybury and Imperial Service College	6 ft 1 in (1.85 m)	175 lb (79 kg)	Mar 4, 2020
Brody Nunn; PG	Recruit ratings: Scout: Rivals: (0)				
Clancy Bird; PF	Sydney, Australia	St Augustine's College	6 ft 9 in (2.06 m)	200 lb (91 kg)	Dec 9, 2020
Clancy Bird; PF	Recruit ratings: Scout: Rivals: (0)				
Overall recruit ranking:
Note: In many cases, Scout, Rivals, 247Sports, On3, and ESPN may conflict in their listings of height and weight.; In these cases, the average was taken. ESPN grades are on a 100-point scale.; Sources: "2021 Team Ranking". Rivals.

== Roster ==
2021–22 Seattle Redhawks men's basketball team
Players
Coaches

Pos.	#	Name	Height	Weight	Year	Previous school	Hometown
G	0	Rip Economou	6 ft 8 in (2.03 m)	190 lb (86 kg)	Sr	Santa Monica HS	Santa Monica, CA
G	1	Vasja Pandža	6 ft 8 in (2.03 m)	210 lb (95 kg)	So	The Hotchkiss School	Leeds, England
G	2	Darrion Trammell	5 ft 10 in (1.78 m)	165 lb (75 kg)	Jr	St. Ignatius College Prep; City College of San Francisco	Marin City, CA
G	5	Cameron Tyson	6 ft 2 in (1.88 m)	190 lb (86 kg)	RS Jr	Bothell HS; Idaho/Houston	Bothell, WA
G	10	Aaron Nettles	6 ft 0 in (1.83 m)	175 lb (79 kg)	RS Sr	Seattle Prep	Seattle, WA
G/F	11	Riley Grigsby	6 ft 6 in (1.98 m)	220 lb (100 kg)	Sr	Archbishop Mitty HS	San Jose, CA
G	12	Brody Nunn	6 ft 1 in (1.85 m)	175 lb (79 kg)	Fr	Haileybury College	Melbourne, Australia
G	13	Kyree Brown	6 ft 0 in (1.83 m)	170 lb (77 kg)	RS So	Berkeley HS; City College of San Francisco	Oakland, CA
F	14	Matt Vail (W)	6 ft 5 in (1.96 m)	190 lb (86 kg)	RS Jr	Stanwood HS	Stanwood, WA
F	15	Emeka Udenyi	6 ft 6 in (1.98 m)	225 lb (102 kg)	Sr	De La Salle HS; City College of San Francisco	Oakland, CA
C	21	Viktor Rajković	6 ft 6 in (1.98 m)	210 lb (95 kg)	RS Fr	The Branson School	Mill Valley, CA
G	24	Nate Robinson	6 ft 4 in (1.93 m)	185 lb (84 kg)	Sr	Las Lomas HS; City College of San Francisco	Walnut Creek, CA
F	25	Brandon Chatfield	6 ft 10 in (2.08 m)	210 lb (95 kg)	RS So	Clarkston HS; Washington State	Orofino, ID
G	33	Kobe Williamson	6 ft 8 in (2.03 m)	225 lb (102 kg)	So	Haileybury College	Melbourne, Australia
G	35	Matthew Levis	6 ft 1 in (1.85 m)	175 lb (79 kg)	Fr	Jesuit HS	Portland, OR
G	41	Jaren Nafarrete	5 ft 7 in (1.7 m)	140 lb (64 kg)	RS So	Foothills Christian HS	San Diego, CA
F	45	Clancy Bird	6 ft 9 in (2.06 m)	200 lb (91 kg)	Fr	St Augustine's College	Sydney, Australia
F	55	Joe Wall (W)	6 ft 7 in (2.01 m)	215 lb (98 kg)	RS Jr	Jesuit HS	Portland, OR

Head coach

- Chris Victor (interim) (Concordia–Irvine)

Assistant coach(es)

- Alex Pribble (California)
- D'Marques Tyson (Portland)

Legend

- (C) Team captain
- (S) Suspended
- (I) Ineligible
- (W) Walk-on
- Injured
- Current redshirt

Roster

== Schedule and results ==
Date time, TV	Rank^{#}	Opponent^{#}	Result	Record	Site (attendance) city, state
Non-conference regular season
November 10, 2021*; 7:00 p.m., ESPN+		Alcorn State; Washington State Multi-Team Event	W 69–66	1–0	Redhawk Center (503); Seattle, WA
November 12, 2021*; 7:00 p.m., P12N		at Washington State; Washington State Multi-Team Event	L 61–79	1–1	Beasley Coliseum (3,878); Pullman, WA
November 14, 2021*; 5:00 p.m., ESPN+		Idaho State	W 77–51	2–1	Climate Pledge Arena (2,302); Seattle, WA
November 18, 2021*; 7:00 p.m., ESPN+		Morgan State	W 93–80	3–1	Redhawk Center (524); Seattle, WA
November 22, 2021*; 7:00 p.m., ESPN+		Arkansas–Pine Bluff	W 77–56	4–1	Climate Pledge Arena (1,082); Seattle, WA
November 23, 2021*; 7:00 p.m., ESPN+		Pacific Lutheran	W 89–40	5–1	Redhawk Center (450); Seattle, WA
November 27, 2021*; 1:00 p.m., ESPN+		St. Thomas (MN)	W 81–64	6–1	Redhawk Center (314); Seattle, WA
December 1, 2021*; 7:00 p.m., ESPN+		McNeese State	W 78–62	7–1	Climate Pledge Arena (775); Seattle, WA
December 5, 2021*; 1:00 p.m., ESPN+		VMI	L 82–89	7–2	Climate Pledge Arena (1,334); Seattle, WA
December 8, 2021*; 7:00 p.m.		at UNLV; UNLV at the Mandalay Bay	L 56–76	7–3	Michelob Ultra Arena (637); Paradise, NV
December 12, 2021*; 5:00 p.m., ESPN+		UC San Diego	W 73–51	8–3	Climate Pledge Arena (1,998); Seattle, WA
December 18, 2021*; 7:00 p.m., P12N		at Washington	L 56–64	8–4	Alaska Airlines Arena (6,084); Seattle, WA
December 22, 2021*; 2:00 p.m., ESPN+		Northwest	W 100–68	9–4	Redhawk Center (465); Seattle, WA
WAC regular season
January 6, 2022; 5:00 p.m., ESPN+		at Chicago State	W 93–77	10–4 (1–0)	Jones Convocation Center (187); Chicago, IL
January 12, 2022; 7:00 p.m., ESPN+		Utah Valley	W 71–65	11–4 (2–0)	Climate Pledge Arena (1,260); Seattle, WA
January 15, 2022; 1:00 p.m., ESPN+		Dixie State	W 79–68	12–4 (3–0)	Redhawk Center (456); Seattle, WA
January 17, 2022; 7:00 p.m., ESPN+		at California Baptist; Rescheduled from Jan. 1	W 92–85 ^{OT}	13–4 (4–0)	CBU Events Center (2,531); Riverside, CA
January 20, 2022; 5:00 p.m., ESPN+		at Abilene Christian	W 72–62	14–4 (5–0)	Teague Center (1,179); Abilene, TX
January 22, 2022; 5:00 p.m., ESPN+		at Tarleton State	W 76–68	15–4 (6–0)	Wisdom Gym (2,022); Stephenville, TX
January 26, 2022; 7:00 p.m., ESPN+		Stephen F. Austin	W 70–62	16–4 (7–0)	Climate Pledge Arena (1,621); Seattle, WA
January 29, 2022; 1:00 p.m., ESPN+		Sam Houston State	W 78–63	17–4 (8–0)	Redhawk Center (725); Seattle, WA
February 3, 2022; 6:00 p.m., ESPN+		at Grand Canyon	L 66–78	17–5 (8–1)	GCU Arena (6,905); Phoenix, AZ
February 5, 2022; 3:00 p.m., ESPN+		at New Mexico State	L 64–79	17–6 (8–2)	Pan American Center (6,302); Las Cruces, NM
February 10, 2022; 7:00 p.m., ESPN+		Texas–Rio Grande Valley	W 67–59	18–6 (9–2)	Climate Pledge Arena (2,488); Seattle, WA
February 12, 2022; 1:00 p.m., ESPN+		Lamar	W 76–50	19–6 (10–2)	Redhawk Center (592); Seattle, WA
February 16, 2022; 5:00 p.m., ESPN+		at Texas–Rio Grande Valley	W 102–62	20–6 (11–2)	UTRGV Fieldhouse (1,618); Edinburg, TX
February 19, 2022; 1:00 p.m., ESPN+		California Baptist	W 67–64	21–6 (12–2)	Climate Pledge Arena (1,670); Seattle, WA
February 21, 2022; 7:00 p.m., ESPN+		New Mexico State; Rescheduled from Dec. 30	L 55–68	21–7 (12–3)	Redhawk Center (999); Seattle, WA
February 24, 2022; 5:00 p.m., ESPN+		at Utah Valley	L 52–67	21–8 (12–4)	UCCU Center (2,547); Orem, UT
February 26, 2022; 6:00 p.m., ESPN+		at Dixie State	W 73–65	22–8 (13–4)	Burns Arena (1,288); St. George, UT
March 5, 2022; 1:00 p.m., ESPN+		Chicago State	W 74–66	23–8 (14–4)	Redhawk Center (999); Seattle, WA
WAC tournament
March 11, 2022; 8:30 pm, ESPN+	(2)	vs. (6) Abilene Christian; Semifinals	L 76–78	23–9	Orleans Arena (2,730); Paradise, NV
*Non-conference game. ^{#}Rankings from AP Poll. (#) Tournament seedings in parentheses. All times are in Pacific Time.

== See also ==
2021–22 Seattle Redhawks women's basketball team
