= Utah Tech Trailblazers men's basketball statistical leaders =

The Utah Tech Trailblazers basketball statistical leaders are individual statistical leaders of the Utah Tech Trailblazers men's basketball program in various categories, including points, rebounds, assists, steals, and blocks. Within those areas, the lists identify single-game, single-season, and career leaders. The Trailblazers represent Utah Tech University, formerly Dixie State University, in the NCAA Division I Big Sky Conference.

Utah Tech^{(then Dixie State)} began competing in NCAA basketball in 2006. These lists are updated through the end of the 2020–21 season.

== Scoring ==
Career
Rk	Player	Points	Seasons
1	Zach Robbins	1,470	2009–10 2012–13 2013–14 2014–15
2	Trevor Hill	1,441	2014–15 2015–16 2016–17 2017–18
3	Noa Gonsalves	1,238	2021–22 2022–23 2023–24 2024–25
4	Hunter Schofield	1,223	2019–20 2020–21 2021–22
5	DeQuan Thompson	1,185	2011–12 2012–13 2013–14 2014–15
6	Brandon Simister	1,145	2012–13 2015–16 2016–17 2017–18
7	Cameron Gooden	1,108	2020–21 2021–22 2022–23
8	Ryan Sanchez	1,052	2006–07 2007–08 2008–09
9	Dalton Groskreutz	1,049	2008–09 2011–12 2012–13 2013–14
10	Tom Whitehead	1,038	2008–09 2009–10 2010–11

Season
Rk	Player	Points	Season
1	Ethan Potter	572	2025–26
2	Hunter Schofield	492	2019–20
3	Kasey Winters	484	2007–08
4	Cameron Gooden	475	2022–23
5	Matt Conway	467	2018–19
6	Hunter Schofield	464	2021–22
7	Trevor Hill	456	2017–18
	Noa Gonsalves	456	2024–25
9	Zach Robbins	454	2014–15
10	Jack Pagenkopf	453	2019–20

Single game
Rk	Player	Points	Season	Opponent
1	Trevor Hill	35	2017–18	E. New Mexico
	Cameron Gooden	35	2022–23	Southern Utah
3	Matt Conway	34	2018–19	Adams State
4	Jaylen Searles	33	2023–24	California Baptist
	Matt Conway	33	2018–19	Western Colorado
	Steven Larson	33	2012–13	Notre Dame de Namur
7	Jack Pagenkopf	32	2019–20	Colorado Mesa
	Ryan Sanchez	32	2007–08	Notre Dame de Namur
	Ryan Sanchez	32	2007–08	CU-Colorado Springs
10	Hunter Schofield	31	2020–21	Utah Valley

== Rebounds ==
Career
Rk	Player	Rebounds	Seasons
1	Zach Robbins	932	2009–10 2012–13 2013–14 2014–15
2	Trevor Hill	596	2014–15 2015–16 2016–17 2017–18
3	Hunter Schofield	499	2019–20 2020–21 2021–22
4	Ryan Sanchez	474	2006–07 2007–08 2008–09
5	Mark Ogden Jr.	465	2014–15 2015–16
6	Zac Hunter	440	2014–15 2015–16 2016–17 2017–18
7	Jacob Nicolds	438	2018–19 2019–20 2020–21 2021–22 2022–23
8	Tanner Christensen	433	2022–23 2023–24
9	Frank Staine	417	2019–20 2020–21 2021–22 2022–23
10	Dub Price	382	2015–16 2016–17 2017–18 2018–19

Season
Rk	Player	Rebounds	Season
1	Mark Ogden Jr.	276	2015–16
2	Zach Robbins	266	2013–14
	Ethan Potter	266	2025–26
4	Kasey Winters	260	2007–08
5	Zach Robbins	249	2012–13
6	Tanner Christensen	223	2022–23
7	Zach Robbins	222	2014–15
8	Beon Riley	221	2024–25
9	Tanner Christensen	210	2023–24
10	Noah Bolanga	204	2025–26

Single game
Rk	Player	Rebounds	Season	Opponent
1	Zach Robbins	19	2014–15	Point Loma
2	Zach Robbins	18	2012–13	Fresno Pacific
3	Mark Ogden Jr.	17	2015–16	Point Loma
	Zach Robbins	17	2009–10	Academy of Art
5	Mark Ogden Jr.	16	2015–16	Academy of Art
	Mark Ogden Jr.	16	2015–16	Chaminade
	Jordan Rex	16	2013–14	Hawai’i Hilo
	Kasey Winters	16	2007–08	Metro State
9	Sammy Howlin	15	2024–25	Whittier
	Isaiah Clark	15	2017–18	Cal Poly Pomona
	Trevor Hill	15	2016–17	Central Washington
	Marcus Bradley	15	2016–17	BYU-Hawaii
	Mark Ogden Jr.	15	2015–16	Concordia-Irvine
	Mark Ogden Jr.	15	2015–16	California Baptist
	Zach Robbins	15	2013–14	Academy of Art 2013-14
	Zach Robbins	15	2013–14	Chaminade
	Zach Robbins	15	2009–10	Hawai'i Pacific
	Zach Robbins	15	2013–14	Western Oregon
	Zach Robbins	15	2014–15	Western Oregon
	Zach Robbins	15	2013–14	Fresno Pacific
	Kasey Winters	15	2007–08	Grand Canyon
	Kasey Winters	15	2007–08	Hawai'i Pacific
	Kasey Winters	15	2007–08	Colorado Christian
	Kasey Winters	15	2007–08	CU-Colorado Springs

== Assists ==
Career
Rk	Player	Assists	Seasons
1	Trevor Hill	418	2014–15 2015–16 2016–17 2017–18
2	Kimball Payne	395	2008–09 2011–12 2012–13 2013–14
3	Brandon Simister	307	2012–13 2015–16 2016–17 2017–18
4	Mason Sawyer	278	2013–14 2014–15 2015–16
5	Cameron Gooden	274	2020–21 2021–22 2022–23
6	Jack Pagenkopf	257	2018–19 2019–20
7	McKay Massey	253	2009–10 2010–11 2011–12 2012–13
8	Dan Stock	238	2006–07 2007–08
9	Maurice Cole	223	2010–11 2011–12
10	Jeremiah Barnes	215	2009–10 2010–11

Season
Rk	Player	Assists	Season
1	Jack Pagenkopf	180	2019–20
2	Dan Stock	147	2006–07
3	Kimball Payne	145	2012–13
	Kimball Payne	145	2013–14
5	Trevor Hill	142	2017–18
6	Trevor Hill	135	2016–17
7	Maurice Cole	134	2011–12
8	Jeremiah Barnes	127	2010–11
9	Mason Sawyer	114	2014–15
10	Jusaun Holt	113	2025–26

Single game
Rk	Player	Assists	Season	Opponent
1	Jeremiah Barnes	13	2010–11	Pacifica
2	Jusaun Holt	12	2025–26	Southern Utah
	Kimball Payne	12	2013–14	Chaminade
	Dan Stock	12	2006–07	Carroll College
5	Unisa Turay	10	2023–24	UT Rio Grande Valley
	Jack Pagenkopf	10	2019–20	Texas-Tyler
	Jack Pagenkopf	10	2019–20	Fort Lewis
	Mason Sawyer	10	2015–16	Azusa Pacific
	Mason Sawyer	10	2014–15	Azusa Pacific
	Dan Stock	10	2006–07	Northwest Nazarene
	Dan Stock	10	2006–07	Carroll College
	Dan Stock	10	2006–07	Seattle Pacific

== Steals ==
Career
Rk	Player	Steals	Seasons
1	Trevor Hill	164	2014–15 2015–16 2016–17 2017–18
2	Ryan Sanchez	142	2006–07 2007–08 2008–09
3	Noa Gonsalves	126	2021–22 2022–23 2023–24 2024–25
4	Frank Staine	121	2019–20 2020–21 2021–22 2022–23
5	McKay Massey	111	2009–10 2010–11 2011–12 2012–13
6	Robbie Nielson	107	2012–13 2013–14 2014–15 2015–16
7	Jack Pagenkopf	94	2018–19 2019–20
	Cameron Gooden	94	2020–21 2021–22 2022–23
9	Kimball Payne	86	2008–09 2011–12 2012–13 2013–14
10	Brandon Simister	85	2012–13 2015–16 2016–17 2017–18

Season
Rk	Player	Steals	Season
1	Trevor Hill	61	2017–18
2	Jack Pagenkopf	60	2019–20
3	Ryan Sanchez	55	2008–09
	Tanner Davis	55	2025–26
5	Ryan Sanchez	47	2006–07
6	Robbie Nielson	46	2014–15
7	Noah Bolanga	45	2025–26
8	Dan Stock	44	2006–07
9	McKay Massey	43	2011–12
10	Trevor Hill	41	2016–17

Single game
Rk	Player	Steals	Season	Opponent
1	Trevor Hill	6	2017–18	Dominican
	Dan Stock	6	2006–07	Adams State
	McKay Massey	6	2011–12	Grand Canyon
	Ryan Sanchez	6	2006–07	BYU-Hawaii
5	Tanner Davis	5	2025–26	Abilene Christian
	Frank Staine	5	2022–23	Lindenwood
	Frank Staine	5	2021–22	Utah Valley
	Cameron Gooden	5	2020–21	California Baptist
	Jack Pagenkopf	5	2019–20	Colo. Sch. of Mines
	Trevor Hill	5	2017–18	E. New Mexico
	Brandon Simister	5	2015–16	Holy Names
	Louis Garrett	5	2013–14	Chaminade
	Louis Garrett	5	2013–14	Notre Dame de Namur
	Donovan Plunkett	5	2009–10	Montana State Billings
	Adam Ross	5	2009–10	Academy of Art
	Adam Ross	5	2009–10	Academy of Art
	Ryan Sanchez	5	2006–07	Adams State
	Ryan Sanchez	5	2008–09	Chaminade
	Mason Sawyer	5	2014–15	Fresno Pacific
	Dan Stock	5	2006–07	Texas A&M-Kingsville

== Blocks ==
Career
Rk	Player	Blocks	Seasons
1	Zach Robbins	198	2009–10 2012–13 2013–14 2014–15
2	Tom Whitehead	74	2008–09 2009–10 2010–11
3	Tanner Christensen	73	2022–23 2023–24
4	Trevor Hill	59	2014–15 2015–16 2016–17 2017–18
5	Derek Owen	58	2007–08 2010–11 2011–12 2012–13
6	Samuel Ariyibi	52	2024–25 2025–26
7	Hamed Olayinka	51	2023–24
8	Julien Ducree	46	2017–18 2018–19
9	Mark Ogden Jr.	44	2014–15 2015–16
10	Hunter Schofield	42	2019–20 2020–21 2021–22

Season
Rk	Player	Blocks	Season
1	Zach Robbins	55	2012–13
2	Zach Robbins	53	2013–14
3	Hamed Olayinka	51	2023–24
4	Zach Robbins	50	2014–15
5	Tanner Christensen	48	2023–24
6	Samuel Ariyibi	44	2024–25
7	Zach Robbins	40	2009–10
8	Kasey Winters	34	2007–08
9	Marcus Bradley	33	2016–17
10	Tom Whitehead	31	2009–10

Single game
Rk	Player	Blocks	Season	Opponent
1	Zach Robbins	7	2012–13	BYU-Hawaii
2	Julien Ducree	6	2018–19	Regis
	Zach Robbins	6	2013–14	CS Dominguez Hills
	Zach Robbins	6	2012–13	Fresno Pacific
5	Tanner Christensen	5	2023–24	Utah Valley
	Larry Olayinka	5	2023–24	Cal State Northridge
	Zach Robbins	5	2009–10	Hawai'i Pacific
	Zach Robbins	5	2013–14	Colorado Mesa
	Zach Robbins	5	2014–15	Texas A&M-Commerce
	Zach Robbins	5	2014–15	Point Loma
	Tom Whitehead	5	2009–10	Chaminade
