= Lance Irvin =

American basketball player and coach

Biographical details
- Born: Chicago, Illinois, U.S.

Playing career
- 1987–1988: Colorado State
- 1990–1991: Idaho

Coaching career (HC unless noted)
- 1991–1992: Idaho (asst.)
- 1992–1997: DePaul (asst.)
- 1998–2001: Loyola-Chicago (asst.)
- 2001–2002: Iowa State (asst.)
- 2002–2003: Illinois State (asst.)
- 2003–2004: Texas A&M (asst.)
- 2005–2006: Missouri (asst.)
- 2006–2008: SMU (asst.)
- 2008–2012: Southern Illinois (asst.)
- 2012–2018: Morgan Park HS (asst.)
- 2018–2021: Chicago State

Head coaching record
- Overall: 7–63 (.100)

Lance Irvin is an American college basketball coach, formerly head coach of the Chicago State Cougars men's basketball team.

== Playing career ==
Irvin played college basketball at Colorado State during the 1987–88 season before transferring to Idaho where he played under Larry Eustachy from 1990 to 1991.

== Coaching career ==
Serving as a graduate assistant under Eustachy at Idaho, Irvin got his first coaching opportunity. He then returned home to his native Chicago as an assistant coach at DePaul from 1992 to 1997, followed by an assistant coaching stint at Loyola-Chicago from 1998 to 2001 before reuniting with Eustachy at Iowa State for one season. In 2002, Irvin joined the coaching staff at Illinois State, and made subsequent stops at Texas A&M and Missouri under Melvin Watkins and Quin Snyder respectively. After Missouri, Irvin became an assistant coach at SMU from 2006 to 2008, and then an assistant at Southern Illinois from 2008 to 2012.

Irvin returned home to Chicago and assisted his brother Nick coaching the Morgan Park HS boys basketball team, while also serving as the school's dean of students.

On August 7, 2018, Irvin was named the 13th head men's basketball coach in Chicago State history, replacing Tracy Dildy.

== Personal life ==
Irvin is part of a prominent Chicago basketball family. His late father McGlother "Mac" Irvin is the founder of the Mac Irvin Fire AAU program. Brother Byron is a former NBA first round draft choice and three seasons in the NBA with the Portland Trail Blazers and Washington Bullets, while brothers Mac, Nick and sister Cynthia have all been involved in the Chicago basketball scene.

== Head coaching record ==
Record table
Season	Team	Overall	Conference	Standing	Postseason
Chicago State (WAC) (2018–2021)
2018–19	Chicago State	3–29	0–16	9th	
2019–20	Chicago State	4–25	0–14	9th	
2020–21	Chicago State	0–9 (Note: Chicago State cancelled their season on December 23, 2020 due to concerns over the COVID-19 Pandemic.)	0–0	N/A	
Chicago State:		7–63 (.100)	0–30 (.000)		
Total:		7–63 (.100)			
National champion Postseason invitational champion Conference regular season champion Conference regular season and conference tournament champion Division regular season champion Division regular season and conference tournament champion Conference tournament champion
