= 2020–21 Grand Canyon Antelopes men's basketball team =

American college basketball season

2020–21 Grand Canyon Antelopes men's basketball

WAC regular season co–champions and tournament champions

NCAA tournament, first round
- Conference: Western Athletic Conference
- Record: 17–7 (9–3 WAC)
- Head coach: Bryce Drew (1st season)
- Assistant coaches: Jamall Walker; Ed Schilling; Casey Shaw
- Home arena: GCU Arena

2020–21 WAC men's basketball standings
	Conf.				Overall
Team	W		L	PCT	W		L	PCT
Grand Canyon †	9	–	3	.750	17	–	7	.708
Utah Valley	9	–	4	.692	11	–	11	.500
New Mexico State	7	–	6	.538	12	–	8	.600
California Baptist*	6	–	6	.500	13	–	10	.565
Seattle	4	–	5	.444	12	–	11	.522
Tarleton State*	5	–	7	.417	10	–	10	.500
Dixie State*	4	–	10	.286	8	–	13	.381
Texas–Rio Grande Valley	2	–	5	.286	9	–	10	.474
Chicago State	0	–	0	–	0	–	9	.000
† 2021 WAC tournament winner * Ineligible for the 2021 NCAA tournament due to transition period Chicago State suspended their season on December 23, 2020

The 2020–21 Grand Canyon Antelopes men's basketball team represented Grand Canyon University during the 2020–21 NCAA Division I men's basketball season. They were led by first-year head coach Bryce Drew and played their home games at GCU Arena in Phoenix, Arizona as members of the Western Athletic Conference (WAC). They finished the season 17–7, 9–3 in WAC play, to finish in a tie for the regular-season championship. They defeated Seattle and New Mexico State to win the WAC tournament and received the conference's automatic bid to the NCAA tournament where they lost in the first round to Iowa.

== Previous season ==
The Antelopes finished the 2019–20 season 13–17, 8–8 in WAC play, to finish in a tie for fifth place. They were set to be the No. 4 seed in the WAC tournament; however, the tournament was canceled amid concerns over the COVID-19 pandemic.

On March 13, 2020, the school fired Dan Majerle as head coach of the Antelopes. A few days later, the school named former Vanderbilt and Valparaiso head coach Bryce Drew as the Antelopes' next head coach.

== Roster ==
2020–21 Grand Canyon Antelopes men's basketball team
Players
Coaches

Pos.	#	Name	Height	Weight	Year	Hometown
G	0	Sean Miller-Moore	6 ft 4 in (1.93 m)	200 lb (91 kg)	Sr	Toronto, ON
F/C	1	Dima Zdor	6 ft 10 in (2.08 m)	215 lb (98 kg)	Jr	Yalta, Ukraine
G	2	Chance McMillian	6 ft 2 in (1.88 m)	170 lb (77 kg)	Fr	Vallejo, CA
G	3	Mikey Dixon	6 ft 2 in (1.88 m)	165 lb (75 kg)	RS Sr	New Castle, DE
F	4	Oscar Frayer	6 ft 7 in (2.01 m)	195 lb (88 kg)	RS Sr	Oakland, CA
G	10	Jovan Jr. Blacksher	5 ft 11 in (1.8 m)	155 lb (70 kg)	So	Oakland, CA
G	11	Rashad Smith	6 ft 5 in (1.96 m)	190 lb (86 kg)	Jr	Chandler, AZ
F	15	Raef Gerdes	6 ft 7 in (2.01 m)	180 lb (82 kg)	Jr	Lee's Summit, MO
G	21	Liam Lloyd	6 ft 5 in (1.96 m)	190 lb (86 kg)	Fr	Spokane, WA
G	22	Jayden Stone	6 ft 4 in (1.93 m)	180 lb (82 kg)	Fr	Perth, Australia
F	24	Bryce Okpoh	6 ft 6 in (1.98 m)	190 lb (86 kg)	So	The Colony, TX
C	25	Alessandro Lever	6 ft 10 in (2.08 m)	225 lb (102 kg)	Sr	Bolzano, Italy
F	30	Gabe McGlothan	6 ft 8 in (2.03 m)	220 lb (100 kg)	RS So	Gilbert, AZ
F	31	Ethan Spry	6 ft 6 in (1.98 m)	200 lb (91 kg)	So	Scottsdale, AZ
C	33	Asbjørn Midtgaard	7 ft 0 in (2.13 m)	270 lb (122 kg)	Sr	Helsingør, Denmark

Head coach

- Bryce Drew (Valparaiso)

Assistant coach(es)

- Jamall Walker (Saint Louis)
- Ed Schilling (Miami (OH))
- Casey Shaw (Toledo)

Legend

- (C) Team captain
- (S) Suspended
- (I) Ineligible
- (W) Walk-on
- Injured
- Current redshirt

Roster
Last update: January 3, 2021

== Schedule and results ==
Date time, TV	Rank^{#}	Opponent^{#}	Result	Record	Site (attendance) city, state
Non-conference regular season
November 25, 2020*; 7:00 p.m., ESPN3		Grambling State	W 69–53	1–0	GCU Arena (285); Phoenix, AZ
November 28, 2020*; 6:00 p.m., ESPN3		Benedictine Mesa	W 94–63	2–0	GCU Arena (203); Phoenix, AZ
December 1, 2020*; 7:00 p.m., ESPN3		Mississippi Valley State	W 88–49	3–0	GCU Arena (254); Phoenix, AZ
December 5, 2020*; 7:00 p.m.		Prairie View A&M	Canceled due to COVID-19 issues		GCU Arena; Phoenix, AZ
December 11, 2020*; 6:00 p.m., ESPN3		Nevada	W 87–77	4–0	GCU Arena (328); Phoenix, AZ
December 13, 2020*; 2:00 p.m., ESPN3		No. 23 Arizona State	L 70-71	4–1	GCU Arena; Phoenix, AZ
December 15, 2020*; 7:00 p.m.		American Indian College	Canceled due to COVID-19 issues		GCU Arena; Phoenix, AZ
December 20, 2020*; 5:00 p.m.		vs. San Francisco; Far West Classic	L 65–68	4–2	T-Mobile Arena; Paradise, NV
December 22, 2020*; 9:00 p.m., P12N		vs. Colorado; Far West Classic	L 64–74	4–3	T-Mobile Arena; Paradise, NV
December 29, 2020*; 7:00 p.m.		Denver	Canceled due to COVID-19 issues		GCU Arena; Phoenix, AZ
December 30, 2020*; 7:00 p.m.		Bethesda	Canceled due to COVID-19 issues		GCU Arena; Phoenix, AZ
WAC regular season
January 8, 2021; 6:00 p.m., WAC DN		at Tarleton State	W 75–72	5–3 (1–0)	Wisdom Gym (962); Stephenville, TX
January 9, 2021; 6:00 p.m., WAC DN		at Tarleton State	W 59-48	6–3 (2–0)	Wisdom Gym (833); Stephenville, TX
January 15, 2021*; 7:00 p.m., ESPN3		Bethesda	W 121–62	7–3	GCU Arena (250); Phoenix, AZ
January 16, 2021*; 2:00 p.m., ESPN3		Bethesda	W 98–47	8–3	GCU Arena (304); Phoenix, AZ
January 22, 2021; 7:00 p.m., WAC DN		at Dixie State	W 77–74	9–3 (3–0)	Burns Arena (738); St. George, UT
January 23, 2021; 7:00 p.m., WAC DN		at Dixie State	W 81–46	10–3 (4–0)	Burns Arena (769); St. George, UT
January 29, 2021; 7:00 p.m., ESPN3		New Mexico State	W 70–62	11–3 (5–0)	GCU Arena (1,000); Phoenix, AZ
January 30, 2021; 7:00 p.m., ESPN3		New Mexico State	W 65–53	12–3 (6–0)	GCU Arena (909); Phoenix, AZ
February 5, 2021; 6:00 p.m., WAC DN		at Texas–Rio Grande Valley	Canceled		UTRGV Fieldhouse; Edinburg, TX
February 6, 2021; 6:00 p.m., WAC DN		at Texas–Rio Grande Valley	Canceled		UTRGV Fieldhouse; Edinburg, TX
February 12, 2021*; 5:30 p.m., ESPN3		Cal State Northridge	Canceled		GCU Arena; Phoenix, AZ
February 19, 2021; 7:00 p.m., ESPN3		California Baptist	W 71–61	13–3 (7–0)	GCU Arena (723); Phoenix, AZ
February 20, 2021; 7:00 p.m., ESPN3		California Baptist	L 62–65	13–4 (7–1)	GCU Arena (723); Phoenix, AZ
February 26, 2021; 7:00 p.m., WAC DN		at Seattle	L 57–63	13–5 (7–2)	Redhawk Center; Seattle, WA
February 27, 2021; 7:00 p.m., WAC DN		at Seattle	W 81–71	14–5 (8–2)	Redhawk Center; Seattle, WA
March 5, 2021; 7:00 p.m., ESPN3		Utah Valley	L 55–59	14–6 (8–3)	GCU Arena (822); Phoenix, AZ
March 6, 2021; 7:00 p.m., ESPN3		Utah Valley	W 74–64	15–6 (9–3)	GCU Arena (929); Phoenix, AZ
WAC tournament
March 12, 2021; 6:00 p.m., ESPN+	(1)	vs. (5) Seattle; Semifinals	W 81–47	16–6	Orleans Arena (210); Paradise, NV
March 13, 2021; 7:00 p.m., ESPNU	(1)	vs. (3) New Mexico State; Championship	W 74–56	17–6	Orleans Arena; Paradise, NV
NCAA tournament
March 20, 2021; 3:25 p.m., TBS	(15 W)	vs. (2 W) No. 8 Iowa; First round	L 74–86	17–7	Indiana Farmers Coliseum; Indianapolis, IN
*Non-conference game. ^{#}Rankings from AP poll. (#) Tournament seedings in parentheses. W=West. All times are in Mountain.
