= 2020–21 Chicago State Cougars men's basketball team =

American college basketball season

2020–21 Chicago State Cougars men's basketball
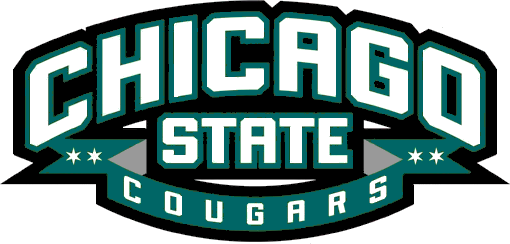
- Conference: Western Athletic Conference
- Record: 0–9 (0–0 WAC)
- Head coach: Lance Irvin (3rd season)
- Assistant coaches: Rodell Davis; Brett Putz
- Home arena: Jones Convocation Center

2020–21 WAC men's basketball standings
	Conf.				Overall
Team	W		L	PCT	W		L	PCT
Grand Canyon †	9	–	3	.750	17	–	7	.708
Utah Valley	9	–	4	.692	11	–	11	.500
New Mexico State	7	–	6	.538	12	–	8	.600
California Baptist*	6	–	6	.500	13	–	10	.565
Seattle	4	–	5	.444	12	–	11	.522
Tarleton State*	5	–	7	.417	10	–	10	.500
Dixie State*	4	–	10	.286	8	–	13	.381
Texas–Rio Grande Valley	2	–	5	.286	9	–	10	.474
Chicago State	0	–	0	–	0	–	9	.000
† 2021 WAC tournament winner * Ineligible for the 2021 NCAA tournament due to transition period Chicago State suspended their season on December 23, 2020

The 2020–21 Chicago State Cougars men's basketball team represented Chicago State University in the 2020–21 NCAA Division I men's basketball season. The Cougars were led by third-year head coach Lance Irvin. They played their home games at the Emil and Patricia Jones Convocation Center as members of the Western Athletic Conference. They finished the season 0–9, 0–0 in WAC play before suspending the season due to COVID-19 and an insufficient number of players.

== Previous season ==
The 2019–20 Cougars finished the 2019–20 season 4–25, 0–14 in WAC play to finish in last place. They were set to be the eighth overall seed in the WAC tournament, but the tournament was cancelled due to the COVID-19 pandemic.

== Offseason ==
=== Departures ===
Name	Number	Pos.	Height	Weight	Year	Hometown	Notes
Leondre Townsen	2	G	6'5"	160	Freshman	Chicago, Illinois	Left program
Amir Gholizadeh	10	F	6'6"	195	Freshman	Toronto, Ontario	Transferred to Tallahassee CC
Christian Jacob	13	F	6'8"	230	Senior	Gary, Indiana	Graduated
Noah Bigirumwami	15	F	6'10"	225	RS-Junior	Santa Clarita, California	Left program
Jace Colley	23	F	6'7"	200	Junior	Preston, Nova Scotia	Left program
Eugene Witherspoon	32	F	6'6"	200	Senior	Chicago, Illinois	Graduated

=== Transfers ===
- Levelle Ziegler - East LA College
- Isaiah Simpson - Santa Monica College
- Aaris-Monte Bonds - Southeastern CC
- Coreyoun Rushin - Idaho State
- Jordan Polynice - East LA College

=== 2020 recruiting class ===
College recruiting information
Name	Hometown	School	Height	Weight	Commit date
Lou Demuth; C	Luxembourg City, LUX	BBC Gréngewald Hueschtert	7 ft 0 in (2.13 m)	235 lb (107 kg)	May 27, 2020
Lou Demuth; C	Recruit ratings: Scout: Rivals: 247Sports: (NR)				
Overall recruit ranking:
Note: In many cases, Scout, Rivals, 247Sports, On3, and ESPN may conflict in their listings of height and weight.; In these cases, the average was taken. ESPN grades are on a 100-point scale.; Sources: "Chicago State 2020 Player Commits". ESPN.; "2020 Team Ranking". Rivals.

== Preseason ==
=== WAC media poll ===
The WAC men's basketball media poll was released on October 27, 2020. Chicago State was picked to finish ninth.

WAC Preseason Poll
Predicted finish	Team
1	New Mexico State (8)
2	Grand Canyon (1)
3	UTRGV
4	California Baptist
5	Seattle U
6	Tarleton State
7	Utah Valley
8	Dixie State
9	Chicago State

== Roster ==
2020–21 Chicago State Cougars men's basketball team
Players
Coaches

Pos.	#	Name	Height	Weight	Year	Hometown
G	0	Rajeir Jones	6 ft 3 in (1.91 m)	190 lb (86 kg)	So	Baltimore, Maryland
G	1	Andrew Lewis	6 ft 3 in (1.91 m)	180 lb (82 kg)	Sr	Milwaukee, Wisconsin
PG	2	Levelle Zeigler	6 ft 1 in (1.85 m)	175 lb (79 kg)	Jr	Oakland, California
G	3	Isaiah Lewis	6 ft 1 in (1.85 m)	155 lb (70 kg)	RS Fr	Romulus, Michigan
F	4	Ke'Sean Davis	6 ft 7 in (2.01 m)	210 lb (95 kg)	Sr	Compton, California
G	5	Xavier Johnson	5 ft 11 in (1.8 m)	160 lb (73 kg)	Sr	Dallas, Texas
F	10	Carlo Marble	6 ft 5 in (1.96 m)	200 lb (91 kg)	Sr	West Des Moines, Iowa
F	11	Kalil Whitehead	6 ft 5 in (1.96 m)	195 lb (88 kg)	So	Detroit, Michigan
C	12	Isaiah Simpson	6 ft 9 in (2.06 m)	240 lb (109 kg)	Jr	Richmond, Virginia
F	13	Aaris-Monte Bonds	6 ft 6 in (1.98 m)	215 lb (98 kg)	Jr	Denver, Colorado
F	15	Coreyoun Rushin	6 ft 6 in (1.98 m)	200 lb (91 kg)	Jr	Chicago, Illinois
C	20	Lou Demuth	7 ft 0 in (2.13 m)	235 lb (107 kg)	Fr	Luxembourg City, Luxembourg
G/F	23	Jordan Polynice	6 ft 6 in (1.98 m)	175 lb (79 kg)	Jr	Santa Clarita, California
C	35	Solomon Hunt	6 ft 9 in (2.06 m)	272 lb (123 kg)	Sr	Pomona, California

Head coach

- Lance Irvin (Idaho)

Assistant coach(es)

- Rodell Davis (Iowa)
- Tommy Strine (Anderson (IN))

Legend

- (C) Team captain
- (S) Suspended
- (I) Ineligible
- (W) Walk-on
- Injured
- Current redshirt

Roster
Last update: March 2, 2021

== Schedule ==
Date time, TV	Rank^{#}	Opponent^{#}	Result	Record	High points	High rebounds	High assists	Site (attendance) city, state
Non-conference regular season
Nov 25, 2020*; 4:00 p.m.		vs. Ohio; Illinois Multi–team Event	L 61–84	0–1	11 – I. Lewis	7 – Bonds	3 – Bonds	State Farm Center (132); Champaign, IL
Nov 26, 2020*; 11:00 a.m., BTN		at No. 8 Illinois; Illinois Multi–team Event	L 38–97	0–2	10 – Johnson	2 – Marble	4 – I. Lewis	State Farm Center (143); Champaign, IL
Nov 27, 2020*; 3:00 p.m.		vs. North Carolina A&T; Illinois Multi–team Event	L 44–74	0–3	12 – Tied	8 – Davis	4 – Johnson	State Farm Center (155); Champaign, IL
Dec 3, 2020*; 2:00 p.m., ESPN+		at Eastern Illinois	L 56–78	0–4	11 – Tied	8 – Bonds	3 – Bonds	Lantz Arena (0); Charleston, IL
Dec 5, 2020*; 4:00 p.m., BTN		at Northwestern	L 66–111	0–5	18 – Zeigler	4 – Tied	6 – Johnson	Welsh–Ryan Arena (0); Evanston, IL
Dec 9, 2020*; 2:00 p.m., NBCSCHI		at Loyola Chicago	L 51–88	0–6	12 – Zeigler	6 – Davis	3 – Johnson	Gentile Arena (0); Chicago, IL
Dec 15, 2020*; 2:00 p.m., ESPN3		at Illinois State	L 62–91	0–7	22 – Johnson	12 – Davis	2 – Tied	Redbird Arena (0); Normal, IL
Dec 18, 2020*; 6:00 p.m., ESPN3		at Northern Illinois	L 54–64	0–8	23 – Johnson	8 – Rushin	4 – Zeigler	Convocation Center (0); DeKalb, IL
Dec 20, 2020*; 2:00 p.m., ESPN3		at Drake	L 67–111	0–9	18 – Zeigler	9 – Rushin	3 – Marble	Knapp Center (331); Des Moines, IA
Dec 22, 2020*; 12:00 p.m., B12N		at Iowa State	Canceled due to insufficient number of available players					Hilton Coliseum; Ames, IA
WAC regular season
Jan 8, 2021; 4:00 p.m., WACDN		UTRGV	Season suspended due to COVID-19					Jones Convocation Center; Chicago, IL
Jan 9, 2021; 4:00 p.m., WACDN		UTRGV	Season suspended due to COVID-19					Jones Convocation Center; Chicago, IL
Jan 15, 2021; 8:00 p.m., WACDN		at Grand Canyon	Season suspended due to COVID-19					GCU Arena; Phoenix, AZ
Jan 16, 2021; 5:00 p.m., WACDN		at Grand Canyon	Season suspended due to COVID-19					GCU Arena; Phoenix, AZ
Jan 22, 2021; 1:00 p.m., WACDN		California Baptist	Season suspended due to COVID-19					Jones Convocation Center; Chicago, IL
Jan 23, 2021; 12:00 p.m., WACDN		California Baptist	Season suspended due to COVID-19					Jones Convocation Center; Chicago, IL
Jan 29, 2021; 8:00 p.m., WACDN		at Seattle	Season suspended due to COVID-19					Redhawk Center; Seattle, WA
Jan 30, 2021; 8:00 p.m., WACDN		at Seattle	Season suspended due to COVID-19					Redhawk Center; Seattle, WA
Feb 5, 2021; 2:00 p.m., WACDN		Utah Valley	Season suspended due to COVID-19					Jones Convocation Center; Chicago, IL
Feb 6, 2021; 2:00 p.m., WACDN		Utah Valley	Season suspended due to COVID-19					Jones Convocation Center; Chicago, IL
Feb 12, 2021; 1:00 p.m., WACDN		at Tarleton State	Season suspended due to COVID-19					Wisdom Gymnasium; Stephenville, TX
Feb 13, 2021; 1:00 p.m., WACDN		at Tarleton State	Season suspended due to COVID-19					Wisdom Gymnasium; Stephenville, TX
Feb 26, 2021; 2:00 p.m., WACDN		Dixie State	Season suspended due to COVID-19					Jones Convocation Center; Chicago, IL
Feb 27, 2021; 2:00 p.m., WACDN		Dixie State	Season suspended due to COVID-19					Jones Convocation Center; Chicago, IL
Mar 5, 2021; WACDN		vs. New Mexico State	Season suspended due to COVID-19					Eastwood High School Gymnasium; El Paso, TX
Mar 6, 2021; WACDN		vs. New Mexico State	Season suspended due to COVID-19					Eastwood High School Gymnasium; El Paso, TX
*Non-conference game. ^{#}Rankings from AP Poll. (#) Tournament seedings in parentheses. All times are in Central.

== Rankings ==
Ranking movements Legend: — = Not ranked
	Week																			
Poll	Pre	1	2	3	4	5	6	7	8	9	10	11	12	13	14	15	16	17	18	Final
AP	—	—	—	—	—	—	—	—	—	—	—	—	—	—	—	—	—	—	—	Not released
Coaches	—	—	—	—	—	—	—	—	—	—	—	—	—	—	—	—	—	—	—	—

*AP does not release post-NCAA Tournament rankings
