= 2020–21 New Mexico State Aggies men's basketball team =

American college basketball season

2020–21 New Mexico State Aggies men's basketball
- Conference: Western Athletic Conference
- Record: 12–8 (7–6 WAC)
- Head coach: Chris Jans (4th season)
- Assistant coaches: James Miller; David Anwar; Corey Barker

2020–21 WAC men's basketball standings
	Conf.				Overall
Team	W		L	PCT	W		L	PCT
Grand Canyon †	9	–	3	.750	17	–	7	.708
Utah Valley	9	–	4	.692	11	–	11	.500
New Mexico State	7	–	6	.538	12	–	8	.600
California Baptist*	6	–	6	.500	13	–	10	.565
Seattle	4	–	5	.444	12	–	11	.522
Tarleton State*	5	–	7	.417	10	–	10	.500
Dixie State*	4	–	10	.286	8	–	13	.381
Texas–Rio Grande Valley	2	–	5	.286	9	–	10	.474
Chicago State	0	–	0	–	0	–	9	.000
† 2021 WAC tournament winner * Ineligible for the 2021 NCAA tournament due to transition period Chicago State suspended their season on December 23, 2020

The 2020–21 New Mexico State Aggies men's basketball team represented New Mexico State University during the 2020–21 NCAA Division I men's basketball season. The Aggies were led by fourth-year head coach Chris Jans and were members of the Western Athletic Conference. Due to COVID-19 restrictions in the state of New Mexico, the Aggies did not play their home games at their normal home arena, the Pan American Center. Instead, they played their "home" games at various different locations, mainly in the Phoenix, Arizona area.

== Previous season ==
The Aggies finished the 2019–20 season 25–6, 16–0 in WAC play to win the WAC regular season championship. They were set to be the No. 1 seed in the WAC tournament, however, the tournament was cancelled amid the COVID-19 pandemic. Due to the WAC Tournament cancellation, they were awarded the WAC's automatic bid to the NCAA tournament. However, the NCAA Tournament was also cancelled due to the same outbreak.

== Roster ==
2020–21 New Mexico State Aggies men's basketball team
Players
Coaches

Pos.	#	Name	Height	Weight	Year	Previous school	Hometown
G	0	C.J. Roberts	6 ft 1 in (1.85 m)	190 lb (86 kg)	Jr	Richland HS; Ranger College	North Richland Hills, TX
F	1	Mayan Kiir	6 ft 9 in (2.06 m)	220 lb (100 kg)	RS Jr	Victory Rock Prep; South Florida	Bradenton, FL
F	2	Donnie Tillman	6 ft 7 in (2.01 m)	225 lb (102 kg)	Sr	Findlay Prep; UNLV	Detroit, Michigan
G	3	Evan Gilyard II	5 ft 10 in (1.78 m)	170 lb (77 kg)	Sr	Simeon Career Academy; UTEP	Chicago, Illinois
F	4	Rashaun Agee	6 ft 7 in (2.01 m)	210 lb (95 kg)	RS Fr	Bogan HS	Chicago, Illinois
G	5	Clayton Henry	6 ft 4 in (1.93 m)	200 lb (91 kg)	RS Sr	Bishop McNally HS; Palm Beach State	Calgary, Alberta, Canada
G	10	Sir'Jabari Rice	6 ft 4 in (1.93 m)	180 lb (82 kg)	RS Jr	Fort Bend Marshall HS	Houston, TX
G	11	Kalen Williams	6 ft 2 in (1.88 m)	170 lb (77 kg)	So	Lakeside HS; Western Nebraska CC	Hephzibah, GA
G	13	Jason King	6 ft 4 in (1.93 m)	200 lb (91 kg)	Jr	Parker HS; Snead State CC	Birmingham, AL
F	14	Marcus Watson	6 ft 6 in (1.98 m)	215 lb (98 kg)	RS Fr	Buford HS; Oklahoma State	Buford, GA
G	20	Tennessee Owens	5 ft 10 in (1.78 m)	165 lb (75 kg)	RS Sr	Centennial HS; Alabama–Huntsville	Las Cruces, NM
F	22	Wilfried Likayi	6 ft 9 in (2.06 m)	210 lb (95 kg)	RS Jr	Parkrose HS; Casper College	Portland, OR
F	24	William McNair	6 ft 10 in (2.08 m)	265 lb (120 kg)	RS So	Martin Luther King HS	Philadelphia, PA
G	32	Bryce Rewalt	5 ft 11 in (1.8 m)	165 lb (75 kg)	GS	Centennial HS	Las Cruces, NM
F	35	Johnny McCants	6 ft 7 in (2.01 m)	225 lb (102 kg)	RS Sr	Oñate HS	Las Cruces, NM

Head coach

- Chris Jans (Loras)

Assistant coach(es)

- James Miller (CSU Pueblo)
- David Anwar (Fitchburg State)
- Corey Barker (Prairie View A&M)

Legend

- (C) Team captain
- (S) Suspended
- (I) Ineligible
- (W) Walk-on
- Injured
- Current redshirt

Roster
Last update: December 30, 2020

== Schedule and results ==
Date time, TV	Rank^{#}	Opponent^{#}	Result	Record	High points	High rebounds	High assists	Site (attendance) city, state
Non-conference regular season
Nov 29, 2020*; 5:30 pm, FSAZ		at Arizona Christian	W 83–77	1–0	20 – Henry	9 – Rice	4 – Rice	ACU Events Center (72); Glendale, AZ
Dec 1, 2020*; 7:00 pm, Facebook Live		vs. Benedictine Mesa	W 92–54	2–0	17 – Tied	12 – McCants	7 – Gilyard II	The PHHacility (0); Phoenix, AZ
Dec 5, 2020*; 3:00 pm, WCC Network		at Santa Clara	Canceled due to COVID-19 issues					Kaiser Permanente Arena; Santa Cruz, CA
Dec 7, 2020*; 7:00 pm, Big West.TV		at Cal Poly	Canceled due to COVID-19 issues					Mott Athletics Center; San Luis Obispo, CA
Dec 12, 2020*		at Arizona	Canceled due to COVID-19 issues					McKale Center; Tucson, AZ
Dec 28, 2020*; 3:00 pm, BigWest.TV		at Cal State Northridge	L 63–66	2–1	19 – McCants	17 – Tillman	3 – Tillman	Matadome; Northridge, CA
Dec 31, 2020*; 3:00 pm, WCC Network		at Santa Clara	Canceled due to COVID-19 issues					Toyota Arena; Ontario, CA
Jan. 2, 2021*; 3:00 pm, BigWest.TV		at UC Riverside	Canceled due to COVID-19 issues					SRC Arena; Riverside, CA
Jan. 3, 2021*; 5:00 pm, BigWest.TV		at UC Riverside	Canceled due to COVID-19 issues					SRC Arena; Riverside, CA
WAC Regular Season
Jan. 8, 2021; 7:00 pm, WAC DN		at Dixie State	Postponed due to COVID-19 issues					Burns Arena; St. George, UT
Jan. 9, 2021; 5:00 pm, WAC DN		at Dixie State	Postponed due to COVID-19 issues					Burns Arena; St. George, UT
Jan. 22, 2021; 3:00 pm, FSAZ		UT Rio Grande Valley	Postponed due to COVID-19 issues					Don Haskins Center; El Paso, TX
Jan. 23, 2021; 7:00 pm, FSAZ		UT Rio Grande Valley	Canceled due to COVID-19 issues					Don Haskins Center; El Paso, TX
Jan 25, 2021*; 4:00 pm, FSAZ		vs. Western New Mexico	W 70–41	3–1	20 – Likayi	8 – McNair	2 – 3 tied	Don Haskins Center (0); El Paso, TX
Jan 29, 2021; 7:00 pm, ESPN3		at Grand Canyon	L 62–70	3–2 (0–1)	13 – McCants	8 – McCants	3 – Gilyard II	GCU Arena (1,000); Phoenix, AZ
Jan 30, 2021; 7:00 pm, ESPN3		at Grand Canyon	L 53–65	3–3 (0–2)	13 – Likayi	5 – Henry	3 – Tied	GCU Arena (909); Phoenix, AZ
Feb 5, 2021; 7:00 pm, FSSW		California Baptist	L 75–85	3–4 (0–3)	17 – Rice	7 – Henry	4 – Tied	Eastwood High School; El Paso, TX
Feb 6, 2021; 7:00 pm, FSSW		California Baptist	W 97–70	4–4 (1–3)	20 – Rice	6 – McCants	3 – Tied	Eastwood High School; El Paso, TX
Feb 12, 2021; 7:00 pm, ESPN+		at Seattle	L 72–83	4–5 (1–4)	16 – Tillman	9 – Tillman	6 – Rice	Redhawk Center; Seattle, WA
Feb 13, 2021; 7:00 pm, ESPN+		at Seattle	W 65–58	5–5 (2–4)	19 – Rice	10 – Henry	6 – Gilyard	Redhawk Center; Seattle, WA
Feb 19, 2021; 7:00 pm, FSSW		Utah Valley	L 66–69	5–6 (2–5)	13 – Roberts	6 – Likayi	4 – Gilyard	Eastwood High School; El Paso, TX
Feb 20, 2021; 7:00 pm, FSSW		Utah Valley	W 67–60	6–6 (3–5)	20 – Rice	6 – Tillman	2 – Tillman	Eastwood High School; El Paso, TX
Feb 26, 2021; 6:00 pm, ESPN+		at Tarleton State	W 78–51	7–6 (4–5)	18 – McCants	7 – Tillman	5 – Roberts	Wisdom Gym (1,172); Stephanville, TX
Feb 27, 2021; 6:00 pm, WAC DN		at Tarleton State	L 55–64	7–7 (4–6)	12 – Roberts	8 – Tied	3 – Henry	Wisdom Gym (1,464); Stephenville, TX
Mar. 2, 2021; 1:00 pm, FSAZ		UT Rio Grande Valley rescheduled from January 22	W 69–51	8–7 (5–6)	16 – Rice	8 – Rice	5 – Gilyard	Don Haskins Center; El Paso, TX
Mar. 4, 2021; WAC DN		Chicago State	Canceled due to COVID-19 issues					Eastwood High School; El Paso, TX
Mar. 5, 2021; WAC DN		Chicago State	Canceled due to COVID-19 issues					Eastwood High School; El Paso, TX
Mar 5, 2021; 7:00 pm, WAC DN		at Dixie State rescheduled from January 8	W 76–66	9–7 (6–6)	20 – Rice	14 – McCants	4 – Williams	Burns Arena (403); St. George, UT
Mar 6, 2021; 7:00 pm, WAC DN		at Dixie State rescheduled from January 9	W 68–56	10–7 (7–6)	22 – Tillman	6 – Tillman	5 – McCants	Burns Arena (415); St. George, UT
WAC tournament
Mar 11, 2021; 7:00 pm, ESPN+	(3)	vs. (6) UT Rio Grande Valley; Quarterfinals	W 77–61	11–7	15 – Likayi	9 – Rice	4 – Williams	Orleans Arena; Paradise, NV
Mar 12, 2021; 7:00 pm, ESPN+	(3)	vs. (2) Utah Valley; Semifinals	W 78–62	12–7	23 – Tillman	6 – McCants	3 – McCants	Orleans Arena; Paradise, NV
Mar 13, 2021; 6:00 pm, ESPNU	(3)	vs. (1) Grand Canyon; Championship	L 56–74	12–8	18 – Gilyard II	5 – Tied	2 – Gilyard II	Orleans Arena (325); Paradise, NV
*Non-conference game. ^{#}Rankings from AP Poll. (#) Tournament seedings in parentheses. All times are in Mountain Time Source.
