= 2020–21 Dixie State Trailblazers men's basketball team =

American college basketball season

2020–21 Dixie State Trailblazers men's basketball
- Conference: Western Athletic Conference
- Record: 8–13 (4–10 WAC)
- Head coach: Jon Judkins (16th season)
- Assistant coaches: Jake Schroeder (2nd season); Andrew May (1st season); David Foster (4th season)
- Home arena: Burns Arena

2020–21 WAC men's basketball standings
	Conf.				Overall
Team	W		L	PCT	W		L	PCT
Grand Canyon †	9	–	3	.750	17	–	7	.708
Utah Valley	9	–	4	.692	11	–	11	.500
New Mexico State	7	–	6	.538	12	–	8	.600
California Baptist*	6	–	6	.500	13	–	10	.565
Seattle	4	–	5	.444	12	–	11	.522
Tarleton State*	5	–	7	.417	10	–	10	.500
Dixie State*	4	–	10	.286	8	–	13	.381
Texas–Rio Grande Valley	2	–	5	.286	9	–	10	.474
Chicago State	0	–	0	–	0	–	9	.000
† 2021 WAC tournament winner * Ineligible for the 2021 NCAA tournament due to transition period Chicago State suspended their season on December 23, 2020

The 2020–21 Dixie State Trailblazers men's basketball team represented Dixie State University, now Utah Tech University, in the 2020–21 NCAA Division I men's basketball season. The Trailblazers, led by 16th-year head coach Jon Judkins, played their home games at Burns Arena in St. George, Utah as members of the Western Athletic Conference (WAC).

The season marked Dixie State's first year of a four-year transition period from Division II to Division I. As a result, the Trailblazers were not eligible for NCAA postseason play and could not participate in the WAC tournament. They were eligible to play in the CIT or CBI, but were not invited.

== Previous season ==
The Trailblazers finished the 2019–20 season 23–7 overall, 17–5 in RMAC play to win the conference regular season championship. As the 1st seed in the 2020 RMAC Tournament, they were defeated by the No. 4 seeded Colorado Mesa in the semifinals 79–86. They received the No. 3 seed in the South Central Region of the NCAA DII tournament. However, like many other sporting events, the tournament was cancelled due to the ongoing COVID-19 pandemic.

== Roster ==
2020–21 Dixie State Trailblazers men's basketball team
Players
Coaches

Pos.	#	Name	Height	Weight	Year	Previous school	Hometown
G	10	Brock Gilbert	5 ft 10 in (1.78 m)	160 lb (73 kg)	Jr	Umpqua CC	Syracuse, Utah
G	12	Cameron Gooden	5 ft 11 in (1.8 m)	175 lb (79 kg)	Jr	Kilgore CC	Frisco, Texas
G	14	Dason Youngblood	6 ft 2 in (1.88 m)	195 lb (88 kg)	Sr	Skagit Valley CC	South Jordan, Utah
G	20	Jamar Ergas	6 ft 4 in (1.93 m)	205 lb (93 kg)	Sr	South Plains CC	Scarborough, Toronto
G/F	22	Frank Staine	6 ft 6 in (1.98 m)	205 lb (93 kg)	So	St. Anthony HS	Inglewood, California
G	24	Jacob Nicolds	6 ft 5 in (1.96 m)	220 lb (100 kg)	So	Gilbert HS	Gilbert, Arizona
G	30	Andre Mulibea	6 ft 6 in (1.98 m)	210 lb (95 kg)	Fr	East HS	Salt Lake City, Utah
G	32	Lleyton Parker	6 ft 3 in (1.91 m)	195 lb (88 kg)	So	Bingham HS	South Jordan, Utah
G	34	Emad Elniel	6 ft 6 in (1.98 m)	195 lb (88 kg)	Fr	Independence HS	Phoenix, Arizona
F	40	Trevon Allfrey	6 ft 7 in (2.01 m)	240 lb (109 kg)	RS So	Seattle	West Jordan, Utah
F	42	Mikey Frazier	6 ft 11 in (2.11 m)	250 lb (113 kg)	RS So	Garden City CC	Salt Lake City, Utah
F	44	Hunter Schofield	6 ft 8 in (2.03 m)	225 lb (102 kg)	Sr	Salt Lake CC	Spanish Fork, Utah
F	50	Jarod Greene	6 ft 9 in (2.06 m)	255 lb (116 kg)	Sr	North Idaho CC	Blackfoot, Idaho
G	52	Mark Hatch	6 ft 0 in (1.83 m)	190 lb (86 kg)	Jr	Scottsdale CC	Mesa, Arizona
G	54	Isaiah Pope	6 ft 5 in (1.96 m)	200 lb (91 kg)	So	Humboldt State	Yorba Linda, California
G		Mason Chase	6 ft 4 in (1.93 m)	165 lb (75 kg)	Fr	Desert Hills HS	St. George, Utah
F		Noah Lemke	6 ft 10 in (2.08 m)	205 lb (93 kg)	Fr	Dixie HS	St. George, Utah
G		Brock Staheli	6 ft 3 in (1.91 m)	210 lb (95 kg)	So	Snow Canyon HS	Santa Clara, Utah

Head coach

- Jon Judkins (Utah State)

Assistant coach(es)

- Jake Schroeder (Portland State)
- Andrew May (BYU)
- David Foster (Utah)

Legend

- (C) Team captain
- (S) Suspended
- (I) Ineligible
- (W) Walk-on
- Injured
- Current redshirt

Roster
Last update: November 27, 2020

== Schedule and results ==
Dixie State was scheduled to begin their season on November 28 at home against Weber State, but due to COVID-19, this game was canceled. Chicago State announced on December 23, 2020, that they would suspend all further men's basketball operations, canceling all conference games in the process.

Date time, TV	Rank^{#}	Opponent^{#}	Result	Record	Site (attendance) city, state
Non-conference regular season
November 28, 2020*; 2:00 pm, WAC DN		Weber State	Canceled due to COVID-19 issues		Burns Arena; St. George, UT
December 2, 2020*; 7:00 pm, WAC DN		North Dakota	W 74–73	1–0	Burns Arena (475); St. George, UT
December 5, 2020*; 2:00 pm, WAC DN		Saint Katherine	W 86–48	2–0	Burns Arena (411); St. George, UT
December 12, 2020*; 1:00 pm		at Denver	W 73–70	3–0	Hamilton Gymnasium (0); Denver, CO
December 15, 2020*; 7:00 pm		at Utah State	Canceled due to COVID-19 issues		Smith Spectrum; Logan, UT
December 17, 2020*; 7:00 pm		at Southern Utah	L 78–85	3–1	America First Event Center (750); Cedar City, UT
December 19, 2020*; 7:00 pm, WAC Digital Network		Bethesda	W 90–69	4–1	Burns Arena (182); St. George, UT
December 29, 2020*; 7:00 pm, ROOT Sports Northwest		at No. 1 Gonzaga	L 67–112	4–2	McCarthey Athletic Center (0); Spokane, WA
January 2, 2021*; 7:00 pm, WAC Digital Network		American Indian College	Canceled due to COVID-19 issues		Burns Arena; St. George, UT
WAC regular season
January 8, 2021; WAC DN		New Mexico State	Postponed due to COVID-19 issues		Burns Arena; St. George, UT
January 9, 2021; WAC DN		New Mexico State	Postponed due to COVID-19 issues		Burns Arena; St. George, UT
January 13, 2021*; 7:00 pm, WAC Digital Network		New Mexico	L 63–72	4–3	Burns Arena (771); St. George, UT
January 15, 2021; 8:00 pm, WAC DN		at UTRGV	L 49–82	4–4 (0–1)	UTRGV Fieldhouse (185); Edinburg, TX
January 16, 2021; 8:00 pm, WAC DN		at UTRGV	L 65–72	4–5 (0–2)	UTRGV Fieldhouse (164); Edinburg, TX
January 22, 2021; 7:00 pm, ESPN+		Grand Canyon	L 74–77	4–6 (0–3)	Burns Arena (738); St. George, UT
January 23, 2021; 7:00 pm, WAC DN		Grand Canyon	L 46–81	4–7 (0–4)	Burns Arena (769); St. George, UT
January 29, 2021; 8:00 pm, WAC DN		at California Baptist	L 74–89	4–8 (0–5)	CBU Events Center (0); Riverside, CA
January 30, 2021; 8:00 pm, WAC DN		at California Baptist	W 79–75	5–8 (1–5)	CBU Events Center (0); Riverside, CA
February 5, 2021; 7:00 pm, WAC DN		Seattle	W 77–76	6–8 (2–5)	Burns Arena (582); St. George, UT
February 6, 2021; 7:00 pm, WAC DN		Seattle	L 56–77	6–9 (2–6)	Burns Arena (645); St. George, UT
February 12, 2021; 7:00 pm, WAC DN		at Utah Valley	L 72–87	6–10 (2–7)	UCCU Center (270); Orem, UT
February 13, 2021; 7:00 pm, WAC DN		at Utah Valley	W 93–89	7–10 (3–7)	UCCU Center (150); Orem, UT
February 19, 2021; 7:00 pm, WAC DN		Tarleton State	L 59–77	7–11 (3–8)	Burns Arena (559); St. George, UT
February 20, 2021; 7:00 pm, WAC DN		Tarleton State	W 64–46	8–11 (4–8)	Burns Arena (437); St. George, UT
February 26, 2021; 7:00 pm, WAC DN		Chicago State	Canceled due to COVID-19 issues		Jones Convocation Center; Chicago, IL
February 27, 2021; 7:00 pm, WAC DN		Chicago State	Canceled due to COVID-19 issues		Jones Convocation Center; Chicago, IL
March 2, 2021*; 7:00 pm, WAC DN		Park–Gilbert	Canceled due to COVID-19 issues		Burns Arena; St. George, UT
March 5, 2021; 7:00 pm, WAC DN		New Mexico State rescheduled from January 8	L 66–76	8–12 (4–9)	Burns Arena (403); St. George, UT
March 6, 2021; 7:00 pm, WAC DN		New Mexico State rescheduled from January 9	L 56–68	8–13 (4–10)	Burns Arena (415); St. George, UT
*Non-conference game. ^{#}Rankings from AP Poll. (#) Tournament seedings in parentheses. All times are in Mountain.
