= 2020–21 Gonzaga Bulldogs men's basketball team =

American college basketball season

2020–21 Gonzaga Bulldogs men's basketball

NCAA tournament, Runner-up WCC regular season and tournament champions Fort Myers Tip-Off champions

National Championship Game, L 70–86 vs. Baylor
- Conference: West Coast Conference

Ranking
- Coaches: No. 2
- AP: No. 1
- Record: 31–1 (15–0 WCC)
- Head coach: Mark Few (22nd season)
- Assistant coaches: Tommy Lloyd (20th season); Brian Michaelson (8th season); Roger Powell Jr. (2nd season)
- Home arena: McCarthey Athletic Center

2020–21 West Coast Conference men's basketball standings
	Conf.				Overall
Team	W		L	PCT	W		L	PCT
No. 1 Gonzaga †	15	–	0	1.000	31	–	1	.969
No. 23 BYU	10	–	3	.769	20	–	7	.741
Loyola Marymount	7	–	5	.583	13	–	9	.591
Pepperdine	7	–	6	.538	15	–	12	.556
Pacific	6	–	7	.462	9	–	9	.500
Santa Clara	4	–	5	.444	12	–	8	.600
Saint Mary's	4	–	6	.400	14	–	10	.583
San Francisco	4	–	9	.308	11	–	14	.440
San Diego	2	–	7	.222	3	–	11	.214
Portland	0	–	11	.000	6	–	15	.286
† 2021 WCC tournament winner Rankings from AP poll

The 2020–21 Gonzaga Bulldogs men's basketball team represented Gonzaga University, located in Spokane, Washington, in the 2020–21 NCAA Division I men's basketball season. The team was led by head coach Mark Few, in his 22nd season as head coach. This was the Bulldogs' 17th season at the on-campus McCarthey Athletic Center and 41st season as a member of the West Coast Conference.

The Bulldogs became the first undefeated team to advance to the national championship game since Indiana State in 1979. Gonzaga lost to fellow 1-seed Baylor in the championship game 86–70, denying the Bulldogs a perfect season.

== Previous season ==
The Bulldogs finished the season 31–2, 15–1 in WCC play to be WCC regular-season champions. They then defeated San Francisco and Saint Mary's to be champions of the WCC tournament. They earned the WCC's automatic bid to the NCAA tournament. However, all postseason play, including the NCAA Tournament, was cancelled amid the COVID-19 pandemic. The Bulldogs finished #2 in the final AP and Coaches poll.

== Offseason ==
=== Coaching changes ===
==== Departures ====
Name	Position	Year at Gonzaga	Alma mater (year)	Reason for departure
Gary Bell Jr.	Graduate assistant	1st	Gonzaga (2015)	Left team

==== Additions to staff ====
Name	Position	Year at Gonzaga	Alma mater (year)	Previous job
Evan Manning	Graduate assistant	1st	Kansas (2016)	Director of Player Development at Wake Forest

=== Player departures ===
Name	Number	Pos.	Height	Weight	Year	Hometown	Reason for departure
Admon Gilder	1	G	6'4"	200	Senior (redshirt)	Dallas, TX	Completed college eligibility (Note: Gilder and Woolridge were both graduate transfers in the 2019–20 season, with Gilder having graduated from Texas A&M and Woolridge from North Texas.)
Ryan Woolridge	4	G	6'3"	175	Senior (redshirt)	Mansfield, TX	Completed college eligibility
Killian Tillie	33	F	6'10"	220	Senior	Cagnes-sur-Mer, France	Graduated
Filip Petrušev	3	F	6'11"	235	Sophomore	Belgrade, Serbia	Signed with Mega Soccerbet
Brock Ravet	32	G	6'1"	175	Freshman	Kittitas, WA	Left team

=== Incoming transfers ===
Name	Number	Pos.	Height	Weight	Year	Hometown	Previous school	Years remaining	Date eligible
Aaron Cook Jr.	4	G	6'1"	180	Senior (redshirt)	St. Louis, MO	Southern Illinois	2 (Note: Initially, Cook and Nembhard were to be eligible for one and two years respectively. However, on October 14, 2020, the NCAA granted an extra year of eligibility for all athletes who participate in a winter sport in 2020–21, including basketball.)	October 1, 2020
Andrew Nembhard	3	G	6'5"	193	Junior	Aurora, ON	Florida	3	November 24, 2020

=== 2020 recruiting class ===
College recruiting
Name	Hometown	School	Height	Weight	Commit date
Dominick Harris #10 PG	Murrieta, CA	Rancho Christian	6 ft 3 in (1.91 m)	190 lb (86 kg)	Jan 28, 2018
Dominick Harris #10 PG	Recruit ratings: Rivals: 247Sports: ESPN:				
Julian Strawther #18 SG	Las Vegas, NV	Liberty HS	6 ft 7 in (2.01 m)	205 lb (93 kg)	Apr 18, 2019
Julian Strawther #18 SG	Recruit ratings: Rivals: 247Sports: ESPN:				
Jalen Suggs #2 CG	West St. Paul, MN	Minnehaha	6 ft 4 in (1.93 m)	195 lb (88 kg)	Jan 3, 2020
Jalen Suggs #2 CG	Recruit ratings: Rivals: 247Sports: ESPN:				
Ben Gregg #21 SF	Clackamas, OR	Clackamas	6 ft 10 in (2.08 m)	225 lb (102 kg)	Sep 9, 2020
Ben Gregg #21 SF	Recruit ratings: Rivals: 247Sports: ESPN: (88)				
Overall recruit ranking: 247Sports: 14 ESPN: 7
Note: In many cases, Scout, Rivals, 247Sports, On3, and ESPN may conflict in their listings of height and weight.; In these cases, the average was taken. ESPN grades are on a 100-point scale.; Sources: "Gonzaga 2020 Basketball Commitments". Rivals.; "2020 Gonzaga Bulldogs Recruiting Class". ESPN.; "2020 Team Ranking". Rivals.

== Roster ==
2020–21 Gonzaga Bulldogs men's basketball team
Players
Coaches

Pos.	#	Name	Height	Weight	Year	Previous school	Hometown
G	4	Aaron Cook Jr.	6 ft 1 in (1.85 m)	180 lb (82 kg)	RS Sr	Westminster Christian; Southern Illinois	St. Louis, MO
F	24	Corey Kispert	6 ft 7 in (2.01 m)	220 lb (100 kg)	Sr	King's	Edmonds, WA
G	11	Joël Ayayi	6 ft 5 in (1.96 m)	180 lb (82 kg)	RS Jr	INSEP	Bordeaux, France
G	23	Matthew Lang (W)	6 ft 3 in (1.91 m)	185 lb (84 kg)	Jr	Jesuit	Portland, OR
G	35	Will Graves (W)	6 ft 5 in (1.96 m)	185 lb (84 kg)	Jr	South Eugene; Lane CC	Eugene, OR
G	3	Andrew Nembhard	6 ft 5 in (1.96 m)	193 lb (88 kg)	Jr	Montverde Academy; Florida	Aurora, ON
F	22	Anton Watson	6 ft 8 in (2.03 m)	225 lb (102 kg)	So	Gonzaga Prep	Spokane, WA
G	5	Martynas Arlauskas	6 ft 7 in (2.01 m)	205 lb (93 kg)	So	President Valdas Adamkus Gymnasium	Kaunas, Lithuania
F	2	Drew Timme	6 ft 10 in (2.08 m)	235 lb (107 kg)	So	Pearce	Richardson, TX
F	10	Pavel Zakharov	7 ft 0 in (2.13 m)	235 lb (107 kg)	So	Montverde Academy	St. Petersburg, Russia
C	21	Oumar Ballo	7 ft 0 in (2.13 m)	260 lb (118 kg)	RS Fr	NBA Academy Latin America	Koulikoro, Mali
G	55	Dominick Harris	6 ft 3 in (1.91 m)	190 lb (86 kg)	Fr	Rancho Christian	Murrieta, CA
G	0	Julian Strawther	6 ft 7 in (2.01 m)	205 lb (93 kg)	Fr	Liberty HS	Las Vegas, NV
G	1	Jalen Suggs	6 ft 4 in (1.93 m)	205 lb (93 kg)	Fr	Minnehaha	West St. Paul, MN
G	32	Evan Inglesby (W)	6 ft 4 in (1.93 m)	200 lb (91 kg)	Fr	Barlow	Gresham, OR
F	30	Abe Eagle (W)	6 ft 9 in (2.06 m)	225 lb (102 kg)	Fr	Chaminade Prep	Los Angeles, CA
F	20	Colby Brooks (W)	6 ft 7 in (2.01 m)	210 lb (95 kg)	Fr	Loyola HS	Los Angeles, CA
F	33	Ben Gregg	6 ft 10 in (2.08 m)	225 lb (102 kg)	Fr	Clackamas	Clackamas, OR

Head coach

- Mark Few (Oregon)

Assistant coach(es)

- Tommy Lloyd (Whitman)
- Brian Michaelson (Gonzaga)
- Roger Powell Jr. (Illinois)

Legend

- (C) Team captain
- (S) Suspended
- (I) Ineligible
- (W) Walk-on
- Injured
- Current redshirt

Roster
Last update: December 17, 2020

- Roster is subject to change as/if players transfer or leave the program for other reasons.
- Andrew Nembhard was initially ruled as a redshirt prior to the start of the 2020–21 season. However, on November 24, 2020, the NCAA granted him immediate eligibility. Additionally, the NCAA has granted an additional year of eligibility to all individuals who participate in winter sports during the 2020–21 school year. Nembhard will thus have three years of eligibility remaining at the start of the 2020–21 season.
- Ben Gregg joined the team on December 17, 2020, after graduating high school early.

=== Coaching staff ===
Name	Position	Year at Gonzaga	Alma mater (year)
Mark Few	Head coach	22nd	Oregon (1987)
Tommy Lloyd	Associate head coach	20th	Whitman (1998)
Brian Michaelson	Assistant coach	8th	Gonzaga (2005)
Roger Powell Jr.	Assistant coach	2nd	Illinois (2005)
Jorge Sanz	Director of basketball operations	3rd	Florida Atlantic (2011)
Evan Manning	Graduate assistant	1st	Kansas (2016)
Ken Nakagawa	Video coordinator	5th	Long Beach State (2014)
Josh Therrien	Athletic trainer	5th	Washington State (2007)
Travis Knight	Strength & conditioning coach	15th	Gonzaga (2000)

== Schedule and results ==
Until the championship game, Gonzaga was the only NCAA basketball team, either men's or women's, to remain undefeated in every game (within and outside its conference) during the 2020–21 season. During the championship game, Baylor University became the season champions after defeating Gonzaga 86–70.

Date time, TV	Rank^{#}	Opponent^{#}	Result	Record	High points	High rebounds	High assists	Site (attendance) city, state
Non-conference regular season
November 26, 2020*; 10:30 am, FOX	No. 1	vs. No. 6 Kansas; Fort Myers Tip-Off	W 102–90	1–0	25 – Timme	9 – Ayayi	8 – Suggs	Suncoast Credit Union Arena (175); Fort Myers, FL
November 27, 2020*; 8:00 am, FOX	No. 1	vs. Auburn; Fort Myers Tip-Off	W 90–67	2–0	28 – Timme	10 – Timme	6 – Suggs	Suncoast Credit Union Arena (288); Fort Myers, FL
December 2, 2020*; 4:00 pm, ESPN	No. 1	vs. No. 11 West Virginia; Jimmy V Classic	W 87–82	3–0	21 – Ayayi	7 – Ayayi	6 – Nembhard	Bankers Life Fieldhouse; Indianapolis, IN
December 5, 2020*; 10:00 am, CBS	No. 1	vs. No. 2 Baylor	Canceled due to COVID-19 issues					Bankers Life Fieldhouse; Indianapolis, IN
December 8, 2020*; 6:00 pm, KHQ/RTNW	No. 1	Tarleton State	Canceled due to COVID-19 issues					McCarthey Athletic Center; Spokane, WA
December 10, 2020*; 6:00 pm, KHQ/RTNW	No. 1	Southern	Canceled due to COVID-19 issues					McCarthey Athletic Center; Spokane, WA
December 12, 2020*; 7:30 pm, KHQ/RTNW	No. 1	Northern Arizona	Canceled due to COVID-19 issues					McCarthey Athletic Center; Spokane, WA
December 14, 2020*; 6:00 pm, KHQ/RTNW	No. 1	Idaho	Canceled due to COVID-19 issues					McCarthey Athletic Center; Spokane, WA
December 19, 2020*; 9:00 am, CBS	No. 1	vs. No. 3 Iowa	W 99–88	4–0	27 – Suggs	18 – Ayayi	6 – Ayayi, Kispert	Sanford Pentagon (243); Sioux Falls, SD
December 21, 2020*; 6:00 pm, KHQ/RTNW	No. 1	Northwestern State	W 95–57	5–0	27 – Kispert	8 – Timme	7 – Suggs	McCarthey Athletic Center; Spokane, WA
December 22, 2020*; 6:00 pm, KHQ/RTNW	No. 1	Northwestern State	W 95–78	6–0	25 – Timme	9 – Timme	5 – Ayayi, Suggs	McCarthey Athletic Center; Spokane, WA
December 26, 2020*; 1:00 pm, CBS	No. 1	vs. No. 16 Virginia	W 98–75	7–0	32 – Kispert	8 – Timme	8 – Nembhard	Dickies Arena (2,795); Fort Worth, TX
December 28, 2020*; 6:00 pm, KHQ/RTNW	No. 1	Northern Arizona	W 88–58	8–0	17 – Ayayi	10 – Ayayi	7 – Nembhard	McCarthey Athletic Center; Spokane, WA
December 29, 2020*; 6:00 pm, KHQ/RTNW	No. 1	Dixie State	W 112–67	9–0	25 – Kispert	11 – Ayayi	6 – Ayayi	McCarthey Athletic Center; Spokane, WA
WCC regular season
January 2, 2021; 7:00 pm, ESPN2	No. 1	San Francisco	W 85–62	10–0 (1–0)	26 – Kispert	11 – Timme	4 – Nembhard	McCarthey Athletic Center; Spokane, WA
January 7, 2021; 7:00 pm	No. 1	Santa Clara	Postponed due to COVID-19 issues					McCarthey Athletic Center; Spokane, WA
January 7, 2021; 5:30 pm, ESPN	No. 1	BYU; Rivalry/moved from February 6	W 86–69	11–0 (2–0)	23 – Kispert	8 – Watson	6 – Ayayi	McCarthey Athletic Center; Spokane, WA
January 9, 2021; 5:00 pm, KAYU/RTNW	No. 1	at Portland	W 116–88	12–0 (3–0)	26 – Timme	13 – Ayayi	14 – Ayayi	Chiles Center; Portland, OR
January 14, 2021; 6:00 pm, ESPN	No. 1	Pepperdine	W 95–70	13–0 (4–0)	23 – Kispert	10 – Watson	4 – Nembhard, Timme	McCarthey Athletic Center; Spokane, WA
January 16, 2021; 7:00 pm, ESPN	No. 1	at Saint Mary's; Rivalry	W 73–59	14–0 (5–0)	17 – Kispert	8 – Timme	2 – Suggs	University Credit Union Pavilion; Moraga, CA
January 23, 2021; 7:00 pm, KHQ/RTNW	No. 1	Pacific	W 95–49	15–0 (6–0)	22 – Timme	11 – Suggs	8 – Suggs	McCarthey Athletic Center; Spokane, WA
January 28, 2021; 6:00 pm, KHQ/RTNW	No. 1	at San Diego	W 90–62	16–0 (7–0)	21 – Timme	8 – Kispert	10 – Nembhard	Jenny Craig Pavilion; San Diego, CA
January 30, 2021; 5:00 pm, ESPN	No. 1	at Pepperdine	W 97–75	17–0 (8–0)	19 – Timme	7 – Ayayi	8 – Nembhard	Firestone Fieldhouse; Malibu, CA
February 4, 2021; 6:00 pm, CBSSN	No. 1	at Pacific; Moved from February 25	W 76–58	18–0 (9–0)	21 – Timme	9 – Suggs	3 – Nembhard, Suggs	Alex G. Spanos Center; Stockton, CA
February 4, 2021; 6:00 pm	No. 1	Loyola Marymount	Postponed due to COVID-19 issues					McCarthey Athletic Center; Spokane, WA
February 6, 2021; 7:00 pm	No. 1	Santa Clara rescheduled from January 7	Postponed due to COVID-19 issues					McCarthey Athletic Center; Spokane, WA
February 8, 2021; 8:00 pm, ESPN	No. 1	at BYU; Rivalry/moved from February 27	W 82–71	19–0 (10–0)	24 – Suggs	13 – Timme	4 – Ayayi	Marriott Center; Provo, UT
February 11, 2021; 7:00 pm, KHQ/RTNW	No. 1	at Santa Clara	Canceled due to COVID-19 issues					Leavey Center; Santa Clara, CA
February 13, 2021; 3:00 pm, ESPN2	No. 1	at San Francisco	W 100–61	20–0 (11–0)	28 – Timme	10 – Timme	5 – Nembhard, Suggs	War Memorial Gymnasium; San Francisco, CA
February 18, 2021; 6:00 pm, ESPN	No. 1	Saint Mary's; Rivalry	W 87–65	21–0 (12–0)	20 – Kispert	6 – Ayayi	5 – Nembhard, Suggs	McCarthey Athletic Center; Spokane, WA
February 20, 2021; 5:00 pm, ESPN2	No. 1	San Diego	W 106–69	22–0 (13–0)	21 – Timme	8 – Kispert, Timme	3 – Kispert	McCarthey Athletic Center (200); Spokane, WA
February 25, 2021; 4:00 pm, CBSSN	No. 1	Santa Clara rescheduled from February 6	W 89–75	23–0 (14–0)	25 – Kispert	11 – Suggs	8 – Suggs	McCarthey Athletic Center (200); Spokane, WA
February 27, 2021; 7:00 pm, ESPN	No. 1	Loyola Marymount rescheduled from February 4	W 86–69	24–0 (15–0)	24 – Kispert	7 – Timme	7 – Suggs	McCarthey Athletic Center (200); Spokane, WA
WCC Tournament
March 8, 2021; 6:00 pm, ESPN	(1) No. 1	vs. (4) Saint Mary's; Semifinals	W 78–55	25–0	18 – Timme	8 – Timme	4 – Timme	Orleans Arena; Paradise, NV
March 9, 2021; 6:00 pm, ESPN	(1) No. 1	vs. (2) BYU; Championship/Rivalry	W 88–78	26–0	23 – Suggs	9 – Ayayi	5 – Suggs	Orleans Arena; Paradise, NV
NCAA tournament
March 20, 2021*; 6:20 pm, TBS	(1 W) No. 1	vs. (16 W) Norfolk State; First Round	W 98–55	27–0	23 – Kispert	9 – Ayayi	7 – Cook	Bankers Life Fieldhouse; Indianapolis, IN
March 22, 2021*; 11:40 am, CBS	(1 W) No. 1	vs. (8 W) Oklahoma; Second Round	W 87–71	28–0	30 – Timme	13 – Timme	4 – Timme	Hinkle Fieldhouse; Indianapolis, IN
March 28, 2021*; 11:10 am, CBS	(1 W) No. 1	vs. (5 W) No. 19 Creighton; Sweet Sixteen	W 83–65	29–0	22 – Timme	8 – Ayayi	8 – Nembhard	Hinkle Fieldhouse; Indianapolis, IN
March 30, 2021*; 4:15 pm, TBS	(1 W) No. 1	vs. (6 W) No. 23 USC; Elite Eight	W 85–66	30–0	23 – Timme	10 – Suggs	8 – Suggs	Lucas Oil Stadium; Indianapolis, IN
April 3, 2021*; 5:34 pm, CBS	(1 W) No. 1	vs. (11 E) UCLA; Final Four	W 93–90 ^{OT}	31–0	25 – Timme	6 – Ayayi	8 – Nembhard	Lucas Oil Stadium (8,131); Indianapolis, IN
April 5, 2021*; 6:20 pm, CBS	(1 W) No. 1	vs. (1 S) No. 3 Baylor; National Championship	L 70–86	31–1	22 – Suggs	5 – Timme	4 – Nembhard	Lucas Oil Stadium; Indianapolis, IN
*Non-conference game. ^{#}Rankings from AP Poll. (#) Tournament seedings in parentheses. W=West. All times are in Pacific Time.

== Rankings ==
Ranking movements Legend: ██ Increase in ranking ██ Decrease in ranking ( ) = First-place votes
	Week																	
Poll	Pre	1	2	3	4	5	6	7	8	9	10	11	12	13	14	15	16	Final
AP	1 (28)	1 (57)	1 (54)	1 (54)	1 (61)	1 (62)	1 (63)	1 (63)	1 (62)	1 (62)	1 (61)	1 (55)	1 (59)	1 (60)	1 (59)	1 (61)	1 (60)	Not released
Coaches	2 (10)	2^ (10)	1 (23)	1 (24)	1 (25)	1 (29)	1 (29)	1 (29)	1 (28)	1 (29)	1 (28)	1 (28)	1 (28)	1 (28)	1 (31)	1 (31)	1 (32)	2

^Coaches did not release a Week 1 poll.
