= 2020–21 Tarleton State Texans men's basketball team =

American college basketball season

2020–21 Tarleton State Texans men's basketball
- Conference: Western Athletic Conference
- Record: 10–10 (5–7 WAC)
- Head coach: Billy Gillispie (1st season)
- Assistant coaches: Steve Shields; Jim Shaw
- Home arena: Wisdom Gym

2020–21 WAC men's basketball standings
	Conf.				Overall
Team	W		L	PCT	W		L	PCT
Grand Canyon †	9	–	3	.750	17	–	7	.708
Utah Valley	9	–	4	.692	11	–	11	.500
New Mexico State	7	–	6	.538	12	–	8	.600
California Baptist*	6	–	6	.500	13	–	10	.565
Seattle	4	–	5	.444	12	–	11	.522
Tarleton State*	5	–	7	.417	10	–	10	.500
Dixie State*	4	–	10	.286	8	–	13	.381
Texas–Rio Grande Valley	2	–	5	.286	9	–	10	.474
Chicago State	0	–	0	–	0	–	9	.000
† 2021 WAC tournament winner * Ineligible for the 2021 NCAA tournament due to transition period Chicago State suspended their season on December 23, 2020

The 2020–21 Tarleton State Texans men's basketball team represented Tarleton State University in the 2020–21 NCAA Division I men's basketball season. The Texans, led by first-year head coach Billy Gillispie, played their home games at the Wisdom Gym in Stephenville, Texas as first-year members of the Western Athletic Conference (WAC).

The season marked Tarleton State's first year of a four-year transition period from Division II to Division I. As a result, the Texans were not eligible for NCAA postseason play and could not participate in the WAC tournament. They were eligible to play in the CIT or CBI, but were not invited.

== Previous season ==
The Texans finished the 2019–20 season 18–12, 13–9 in Lone Star Conference (LSC) play, to finish in a tie for seventh place. They received the No. 7 seed in the LSC tournament, and defeated the No. 10 seed UT Permian Basin in the opening round, 84–68. They advanced to the quarterfinals where they lost to St. Edward's, 52–60.

The season marked the school's final season as a Division II school.

== Roster ==
2020–21 Tarleton State Texans men's basketball team
Players
Coaches

Pos.	#	Name	Height	Weight	Year	Previous school	Hometown
G	0	Joey Madimba	6 ft 5 in (1.96 m)	210 lb (95 kg)	Fr	Mansfield Timberview High School	Mansfield, TX
G	1	Montre' Gipson	5 ft 11 in (1.8 m)	200 lb (91 kg)	Jr	Ranger College	DeSoto, TX
G	2	Freddy Hicks	6 ft 6 in (1.98 m)	210 lb (95 kg)	Fr	Searcy High School	Searcy, AR
F	3	Konstantin Dotsenko	6 ft 7 in (2.01 m)	210 lb (95 kg)	So	Freed–Hardeman	Vorkuta, Russia
G	4	Tahj Small	6 ft 5 in (1.96 m)	195 lb (88 kg)	Jr	Troy	Durham, NC
G	5	Sam Sparks	6 ft 2 in (1.88 m)	185 lb (84 kg)	Fr	Santa Fe Prep	Santa Fe, NM
G	10	Caleb Golden	6 ft 4 in (1.93 m)	190 lb (86 kg)	Fr	Shiloh High School	Austin, TX
G	12	Cadarius Baggett	6 ft 1 in (1.85 m)	180 lb (82 kg)	So	Ranger College	Altheimer, AR
G	13	Shakur Daniel	6 ft 6 in (1.98 m)	185 lb (84 kg)	Jr	Ranger College	Toronto, ON
G	14	Javontae Hopkins	6 ft 0 in (1.83 m)	165 lb (75 kg)	So	Fort Bend Travis High School	Houston, TX
G	20	Caleb Starks	6 ft 3 in (1.91 m)	190 lb (86 kg)	RS Jr	LSU	Lafayette, LA
G	22	Tanner Ford	6 ft 2 in (1.88 m)	165 lb (75 kg)	Fr	Graford High School	Palo Pinto, TX
G	24	Isaiah Range	6 ft 3 in (1.91 m)	215 lb (98 kg)	So	Trinity Christian School	Cedar Hill, TX
G	25	Shamir Bogues	6 ft 4 in (1.93 m)	190 lb (86 kg)	Fr	Killeen Ellison High School	Killeen, TX
G	30	Roman Garcia	5 ft 10 in (1.78 m)	165 lb (75 kg)	Fr	Franklin High School	El Paso, TX
F	34	Heri Ngalamulume	6 ft 9 in (2.06 m)	230 lb (104 kg)	Jr	Ranger College	Kinshasa, DR Congo
F	35	Jonathan Jr. Jackson	6 ft 6 in (1.98 m)	230 lb (104 kg)	Sr	Prairie View A&M	Fort Worth, TX

Head coach

- Billy Gillispie (Texas State)

Assistant coach(es)

- Steve Shields (Baylor)
- Jim Shaw (Grinnell)

Legend

- (C) Team captain
- (S) Suspended
- (I) Ineligible
- (W) Walk-on
- Injured
- Current redshirt

Roster
Last update: December 2, 2020

== Schedule and results ==
Date time, TV	Rank^{#}	Opponent^{#}	Result	Record	Site (attendance) city, state
Non-conference regular season
November 25, 2020*; 7:00 p.m.		Dallas Christian	W 103–48	1–0	Wisdom Gym (256); Stephenville, TX
November 28, 2020*		Howard Payne; West Texas Classic	Postponed due to COVID-19 issues at Howard Payne		Wisdom Gym; Stephenville, TX
December 2, 2020*; 6:00 p.m., SECN		at Texas A&M	L 66–73	1–1	Reed Arena (1,316); College Station, TX
December 5, 2020*; 7:00 p.m., ESPN+		at Abilene Christian; West Texas Classic	L 48–69	1–2	Teague Special Events Center (296); Abilene, TX
December 8, 2020*; 8:00 p.m., Root Sports		at No. 1 Gonzaga	Canceled due to COVID-19 issues at Gonzaga		McCarthey Athletic Center; Spokane, WA
December 9, 2020*; 7:00 p.m.		Arlington Baptist	W 84–43	2–2	Wisdom Gym (482); Stephenville, TX
December 13, 2020*; 1:00 p.m.		at No. 5 Kansas	Canceled due to COVID-19 issues at Tarleton State		Allen Fieldhouse; Lawrence, KS
December 15, 2020*; 7:00 p.m., ESPN+		at No. 2 Baylor	Postponed due to COVID-19 issues at Baylor		Ferrell Center; Waco, TX
December 19, 2020*; 4:00 p.m.		McMurry	Postponed due to COVID-19 issues at Tarleton State		Wisdom Gym; Stephenville, TX
December 23, 2020*; 3:00 p.m.		at Pepperdine	Canceled due to COVID-19 issues		Firestone Fieldhouse; Malibu, CA
December 31, 2020*; 4:00 p.m.		Paul Quinn	Canceled due to COVID-19 issues		Wisdom Gym; Stephenville, TX
WAC regular season
January 8, 2021; 7:00 p.m., ESPN+		Grand Canyon	L 72–75	2–3 (0–1)	Wisdom Gym (962); Stephenville, TX
January 9, 2021; 7:00 p.m., ESPN+		Grand Canyon	L 48–59	2–4 (0–2)	Wisdom Gym (833); Stephenville, TX
January 15, 2021; 8:00 p.m., WAC DN		at California Baptist	L 74–83	2–5 (0–3)	CBU Events Center (0); Riverside, CA
January 16, 2021; 8:00 p.m., WAC DN		at California Baptist	L 67–73	2–6 (0–4)	CBU Events Center (0); Riverside, CA
January 17, 2021*; 8:00 p.m., Pluto TV		at Weber State	L 79–94	2–7	Dee Events Center (0); Ogden, UT
January 22, 2021; 7:00 p.m., ESPN+		Seattle	Canceled due to COVID-19 issues		Wisdom Gym; Stephenville, TX
January 23, 2021; 7:00 p.m., WAC DN		Seattle	Canceled due to COVID-19 issues		Wisdom Gym; Stephenville, TX
January 25, 2021*; 7:00 p.m., WAC DN		Howard Payne	W 113–53	3–7	Wisdom Gym (1,093); Stephenville, TX
January 29, 2021; 7:00 p.m., WAC DN		at Utah Valley	L 60–72	3–8 (0–5)	UCCU Center (100); Orem, UT
January 30, 2021; 7:00 p.m., WAC DN		at Utah Valley	W 70–62	4–8 (1–5)	UCCU Center (100); Orem, UT
February 6, 2021*; 8:00 p.m.		Southwestern Adventist	W 97–26	5–8	Wisdom Gym (284); Stephenville, TX
February 9, 2021*; 6:00 p.m.		McMurry	W 112–54	6–8	Wisdom Gym (335); Stephenville, TX
February 12, 2021; 1:00 p.m., ESPN+		Chicago State	Canceled due to COVID-19 issues		Wisdom Gym; Stephenville, TX
February 13, 2021; 1:00 p.m., WAC DN		Chicago State	Canceled due to COVID-19 issues		Wisdom Gym; Stephenville, TX
February 19, 2021; 8:00 p.m., WAC DN		at Dixie State	W 77–59	7–8 (2–5)	Burns Arena (559); St. George, UT
February 20, 2021; 8:00 p.m., WAC DN		at Dixie State	L 48–64	7–9 (2–6)	Burns Arena (437); St. George, UT
February 26, 2021; 7:00 p.m., ESPN+		New Mexico State	L 51–78	7–10 (2–7)	Wisdom Gym (1,172); Stephenville, TX
February 27, 2021; 7:00 p.m., WAC DN		New Mexico State	W 64–55	8–10 (3–7)	Wisdom Gym (1,464); Stephenville, TX
March 5, 2021; 7:00 p.m., WAC DN		at Texas–Rio Grande Valley	W 65–47	9–10 (4–7)	UTRGV Fieldhouse (510); Edinburg, TX
March 6, 2021; 7:00 p.m., WAC DN		at Texas–Rio Grande Valley	W 69–58	10–10 (5–7)	UTRGV Fieldhouse (161); Edinburg, TX
*Non-conference game. ^{#}Rankings from AP poll. (#) Tournament seedings in parentheses. All times are in Central.
