= 2020–21 Utah Valley Wolverines men's basketball team =

American college basketball season

2020–21 Utah Valley Wolverines men's basketball

WAC regular season co–champions
- Conference: Western Athletic Conference
- Record: 11–11 (9–4 WAC)
- Head coach: Mark Madsen (2nd season)
- Assistant coaches: Todd Phillips; Todd Okeson; Jarred Jackson
- Home arena: UCCU Center

2020–21 WAC men's basketball standings
	Conf.				Overall
Team	W		L	PCT	W		L	PCT
Grand Canyon †	9	–	3	.750	17	–	7	.708
Utah Valley	9	–	4	.692	11	–	11	.500
New Mexico State	7	–	6	.538	12	–	8	.600
California Baptist*	6	–	6	.500	13	–	10	.565
Seattle	4	–	5	.444	12	–	11	.522
Tarleton State*	5	–	7	.417	10	–	10	.500
Dixie State*	4	–	10	.286	8	–	13	.381
Texas–Rio Grande Valley	2	–	5	.286	9	–	10	.474
Chicago State	0	–	0	–	0	–	9	.000
† 2021 WAC tournament winner * Ineligible for the 2021 NCAA tournament due to transition period Chicago State suspended their season on December 23, 2020

The 2020–21 Utah Valley Wolverines men's basketball team represented Utah Valley University in the 2020–21 NCAA Division I men's basketball season. The Wolverines, led by second-year head coach Mark Madsen, played their home games at the UCCU Center in Orem, Utah as members of the Western Athletic Conference.

== Previous season ==
The Wolverines finished the 2019–20 season 11–19, 5–10 in WAC play to finish in finish in eighth place. Due to irregularities in the WAC standings due to cancelled games, they were set to be the No. 6 seed in the WAC tournament, however, the tournament was cancelled amid the COVID-19 pandemic.

== Roster ==
2020–21 Utah Valley Wolverines men's basketball team
Players
Coaches

Pos.	#	Name	Height	Weight	Year	Previous school	Hometown
G	0	Josh Lear	6 ft 3 in (1.91 m)	175 lb (79 kg)	Fr	Sumner High School	Sumner, Washington
G	1	Le'Tre Darthard	6 ft 4 in (1.93 m)	180 lb (82 kg)	So	McCook Community College	Denton, Texas
F	2	Evan Cole	6 ft 10 in (2.08 m)	230 lb (104 kg)	GS	Georgia Tech	Atlanta, Georgia
G	3	Blaze Nield	6 ft 1 in (1.85 m)	185 lb (84 kg)	Jr	BYU	Lehi, Utah
G	4	Trey Woodbury	6 ft 4 in (1.93 m)	200 lb (91 kg)	Jr	UNLV	Las Vegas, Nevada
F/C	5	Tim Fuller	6 ft 9 in (2.06 m)	235 lb (107 kg)	So	Weber State	Gilbert, Arizona
G	10	Jaden McClanahan	5 ft 10 in (1.78 m)	175 lb (79 kg)	So	Independence Community College	Vallejo, California
C	11	Fardaws Aimaq	6 ft 11 in (2.11 m)	245 lb (111 kg)	RS So	Mercer	Vancouver, British Columbia
G	12	Cade Whicker	6 ft 4 in (1.93 m)	180 lb (82 kg)	So	Willamette	Fruit Heights, Utah
G	13	Colby Leifson	6 ft 4 in (1.93 m)	190 lb (86 kg)	So	BYU	Suwanee, Georgia
F	15	Asa McCord	6 ft 6 in (1.98 m)	210 lb (95 kg)	Jr	Salt Lake Community College	Saratoga Springs, Utah
G	20	Truman Brown	6 ft 3 in (1.91 m)	185 lb (84 kg)	Fr	Layton High School	Layton, Utah
F/C	21	Trey Farrer	6 ft 8 in (2.03 m)	235 lb (107 kg)	So	Snow College	St. George, Utah
G	22	Jamison Overton	6 ft 6 in (1.98 m)	190 lb (86 kg)	Sr	Saddleback College	San Diego, California
G	23	Jordan Brinson	6 ft 3 in (1.91 m)	175 lb (79 kg)	So	UAB	Inglewood, California
G/F	25	Chase Potter	6 ft 5 in (1.96 m)	185 lb (84 kg)	Fr	Layton High School	Layton, Utah
G	35	Tyrel Phillips	6 ft 1 in (1.85 m)	205 lb (93 kg)	So	Rigby High School	Rigby, Idaho
F	45	Brock Anderson	6 ft 8 in (2.03 m)	230 lb (104 kg)	So	Bingham High School	Riverton, Utah

Head coach

- Mark Madsen (Stanford)

Assistant coach(es)

- Todd Phillips (Lewis–Clark State)
- Todd Okeson (Nevada)
- Jarred Jackson (Liberty)

Legend

- (C) Team captain
- (S) Suspended
- (I) Ineligible
- (W) Walk-on
- Injured
- Current redshirt

Roster
Last update: January 5, 2021

== Schedule and results ==
Date time, TV	Rank^{#}	Opponent^{#}	Result	Record	Site (attendance) city, state
Non-conference regular season
November 25, 2020*; 3:00 pm, P12N		at Stanford	Canceled due to COVID-19		Maples Pavilion; Stanford, CA
November 26, 2020*; 11:00 am, WAC DN		Adams State	W 100–75	1–0	UCCU Center; Orem, UT
November 28, 2020*; 7:00 pm, BYUtv		at BYU	L 60–82	1–1	Marriott Center; Provo, UT
December 2, 2020*; 6:00 pm, WAC DN		Westminster	W 79–71	2–1	UCCU Center; Orem, UT
December 9, 2020*; 6:00 pm, WAC DN		Southern Utah	L 71–81	2–2	UCCU Center; Orem, UT
December 12, 2020*; 2:00 pm, WAC DN		Wyoming	L 88–93	2–3	UCCU Center; Orem, UT
December 15, 2020*; 5:00 pm, P12N		at Utah	L 67–75	2–4	Jon M. Huntsman Center; Salt Lake City, UT
December 19, 2020*; 2:00 pm, WAC DN		Idaho State	Canceled due to COVID-19		UCCU Center; Orem, UT
December 23, 2020*; 1:00 pm, MWN		at Air Force	Canceled due to COVID-19		Clune Arena; Colorado Springs, CO
December 29, 2020*; 6:00 pm, WAC DN		San Diego Christian	Canceled due to COVID-19		UCCU Center; Orem, UT
January 2, 2021*; 2:30 pm, Pluto TV		at Weber State	L 62–70	2–5	Dee Events Center; Ogden, UT
WAC regular season
January 8, 2021; 6:00 pm, WAC DN		California Baptist	W 77–50	3–5 (1–0)	UCCU Center; Orem, UT
January 9, 2021; 6:00 pm, WAC DN		California Baptist	W 81–77	4–5 (2–0)	UCCU Center; Orem, UT
January 15, 2020; 7:00 pm, WAC DN		at Seattle	W 93–92 ^{OT}	5–5 (3–0)	Redhawk Center; Seattle, WA
January 16, 2021; 7:00 pm, WAC DN		at Seattle	Canceled due to COVID-19		Redhawk Center; Seattle, WA
January 23, 2021*; 2:00 pm, FS1		at St. John's	L 78–96	5–6	Carnesecca Arena; Queens, NY
January 29, 2021; 6:00 pm, WAC DN		Tarleton State	W 73–60	6–6 (4–0)	UCCU Center (100); Orem, UT
January 30, 2021; 6:00 pm, WAC DN		Tarleton State	L 62–70	6–7 (4–1)	UCCU Center (100); Orem, UT
February 5, 2021; 1:00 pm, WAC DN		at Chicago State	Canceled due to Chicago State suspending their season		Jones Convocation Center; Chicago, IL
February 6, 2021; 1:00 pm, WAC DN		at Chicago State	Canceled due to Chicago State suspending their season		Jones Convocation Center; Chicago, IL
February 12, 2021; 6:00 pm, WAC DN		Dixie State	W 87–72	7–7 (5–1)	UCCU Center (270); Orem, UT
February 13, 2021; 6:00 pm, WAC DN		Dixie State	L 89–93	7–8 (5–2)	UCCU Center (150); Orem, UT
February 19, 2021; 7:00 pm, WAC DN		at New Mexico State	W 69–66	8–8 (6–2)	Eastwood High School (0); El Paso, TX
February 20, 2021; 7:00 pm, WAC DN		at New Mexico State	L 60–67	8–9 (6–3)	Eastwood High School (0); El Paso, TX
February 26, 2021; 6:00 pm, WAC DN		Texas–Rio Grande Valley	W 78–74	9–9 (7–3)	UCCU Center (646); Orem, UT
February 27, 2021; 6:00 pm, WAC DN		Texas–Rio Grande Valley	W 73–64	10–9 (8–3)	UCCU Center (705); Orem, UT
March 5, 2021; 7:00 pm, WAC DN		at Grand Canyon	W 59–55	11–9 (9–3)	GCU Arena (822); Phoenix, AZ
March 6, 2021; 7:00 pm, WAC DN		at Grand Canyon	L 64–74	11–10 (9–4)	GCU Arena (929); Phoenix, AZ
WAC tournament
March 12, 2021; 9:00 pm, ESPN+	(2)	vs. (3) New Mexico State; Semifinals	L 62–78	11–11	Orleans Arena; Paradise, NV
*Non-conference game. ^{#}Rankings from AP Poll. (#) Tournament seedings in parentheses. All times are in Mountain.
