= 2020–21 Texas–Rio Grande Valley Vaqueros men's basketball team =

American college basketball season

2020–21 Texas–Rio Grande Valley Vaqueros men's basketball
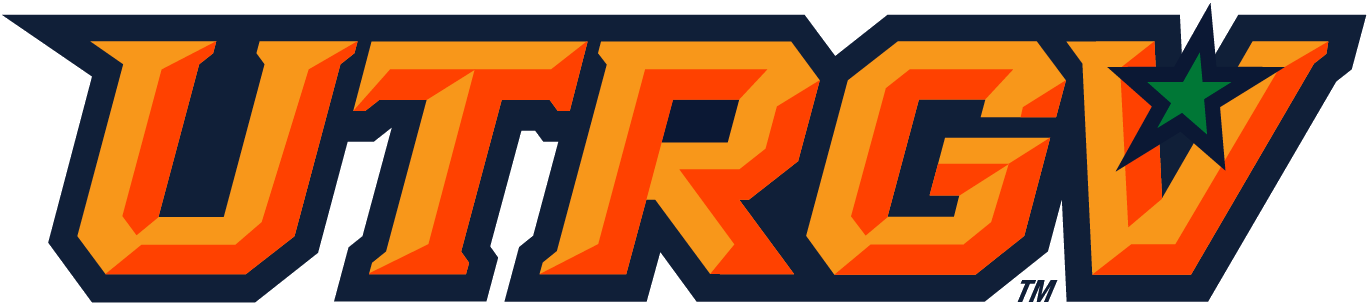
- Conference: Western Athletic Conference
- Record: 9–10 (2–5 WAC)
- Head coach: Lew Hill (5th season; 12 games); Jai Steadman (interim) (remainder of season)
- Assistant coaches: Jai Steadman; Kenya Crandell; Luke Mackay
- Home arena: UTRGV Fieldhouse

2020–21 WAC men's basketball standings
	Conf.				Overall
Team	W		L	PCT	W		L	PCT
Grand Canyon †	9	–	3	.750	17	–	7	.708
Utah Valley	9	–	4	.692	11	–	11	.500
New Mexico State	7	–	6	.538	12	–	8	.600
California Baptist*	6	–	6	.500	13	–	10	.565
Seattle	4	–	5	.444	12	–	11	.522
Tarleton State*	5	–	7	.417	10	–	10	.500
Dixie State*	4	–	10	.286	8	–	13	.381
Texas–Rio Grande Valley	2	–	5	.286	9	–	10	.474
Chicago State	0	–	0	–	0	–	9	.000
† 2021 WAC tournament winner * Ineligible for the 2021 NCAA tournament due to transition period Chicago State suspended their season on December 23, 2020

The 2020–21 Texas–Rio Grande Valley Vaqueros men's basketball team represented the University of Texas Rio Grande Valley in the 2020–21 NCAA Division I men's basketball season. The Vaqueros played their home games at the UTRGV Fieldhouse in Edinburg, Texas, with three games at Bert Ogden Arena, as members of the Western Athletic Conference. The team was led by fifth-year head coach Lew Hill until his death on February 7, 2021. Four days later, assistant head coach Jai Steadman was announced as the interim head coach.

== Previous season ==
The Vaqueros finished the 2019–20 season 14–16, 9–7 in WAC play to finish in third place. They were set to be the No. 2 seed in the WAC tournament, and face Cal State Bakersfield, however, the tournament was cancelled amid the COVID-19 pandemic.

== Roster ==
2020–21 Texas–Rio Grande Valley Vaqueros men's basketball team
Players
Coaches

Pos.	#	Name	Height	Weight	Year	Previous school	Hometown
G	0	Chris Freeman	6 ft 6 in (1.98 m)	190 lb (86 kg)	Sr	NW Kansas Technical College	Winston-Salem, NC
F	1	Sean Rhea	6 ft 8 in (2.03 m)	230 lb (104 kg)	RS Jr	New Mexico Junior College	Houston, TX
G	2	Quinton Johnson II	6 ft 4 in (1.93 m)	195 lb (88 kg)	RS So	Next Level Prep	Oklahoma City, OK
F	3	Connor Raines	6 ft 6 in (1.98 m)	190 lb (86 kg)	So	Notre Dame High School	Beacon Falls, CT
F	4	Jeff Otchere	6 ft 11 in (2.11 m)	240 lb (109 kg)	GS	Stony Brook	Bronx, New York
F	5	Jamal Gaines	6 ft 8 in (2.03 m)	225 lb (102 kg)	RS So	Universal Academy	Red Oak, Texas
G	10	Nick Mora	6 ft 1 in (1.85 m)	167 lb (76 kg)	GS	Weslaco High School	Weslaco, Texas
F	11	Marek Nelson	6 ft 7 in (2.01 m)	200 lb (91 kg)	RS Jr	Western Kentucky	Plano, Texas
G	12	Rob McClain Jr.	6 ft 5 in (1.96 m)	185 lb (84 kg)	Sr	United Tribes Technical College	Red Lake, Minnesota
G	13	Ricky "Doc" Nelson	6 ft 1 in (1.85 m)	170 lb (77 kg)	RS Jr	Weber State	Houston, Texas
G	14	Javon Levi	5 ft 11 in (1.8 m)	175 lb (79 kg)	Sr	Shoemaker High School	Killeen, Texas
G	15	Uche Dibiamaka	6 ft 4 in (1.93 m)	195 lb (88 kg)	Jr	Second Baptist School	Adelaide, SA, Australia
G	20	Isaiah Garcia	5 ft 10 in (1.78 m)	160 lb (73 kg)	So	Weslaco High School	Weslaco, Texas
F	23	Anthony Bratton	6 ft 8 in (2.03 m)	236 lb (107 kg)	Sr	Indian Hills Community College	Omaha, Nebraska
F	24	Malik Lawrence-Anderson	6 ft 6 in (1.98 m)	215 lb (98 kg)	Jr	Tyler Junior College	Kingston, Jamaica
G	32	LaQuan Butler	6 ft 0 in (1.83 m)	170 lb (77 kg)	Jr	Southeastern Louisiana	Lancaster, Texas

Head coach

- Lew Hill (Wichita State)

Assistant coach(es)

- Jai Steadman (Nebraska)
- Kenya Crandell (Nebraska–Kearney)
- Luke Mackay (East Carolina)

Legend

- (C) Team captain
- (S) Suspended
- (I) Ineligible
- (W) Walk-on
- Injured
- Current redshirt

Roster
Last update: December 21, 2020

== Schedule and results ==
Date time, TV	Rank^{#}	Opponent^{#}	Result	Record	Site (attendance) city, state
Non-conference regular season
November 25, 2020*; 7:00 pm, LHN		at No. 19 Texas	L 55–91	0–1	Frank Erwin Center (2,451); Austin, TX
November 28, 2020*; 3:00 pm, WAC DN		UTSA	W 81–64	1–1	UTRGV Fieldhouse (0); Edinburg, TX
December 2, 2020*; 7:00 pm, WAC DN		Texas A&M–Corpus Christi; South Texas Showdown	W 62–59	2–1	Bert Ogden Arena (962); Edinburg, TX
December 4, 2020*; 6:00 pm, WAC DN		Our Lady of the Lake	W 91–68	3–1	UTRGV Fieldhouse (0); Edinburg, TX
December 6, 2020*; 3:00 pm, SECN		at Texas A&M	L 68–81	3–2	Reed Arena (838); College Station, TX
December 10, 2020*; 7:00 pm, Team1Sports		at Texas A&M–Corpus Christi; South Texas Showdown	W 68–64	4–2	American Bank Center (465); Corpus Christi, TX
December 14, 2020*; 6:00 pm, WAC DN		at Incarnate Word	Canceled due to COVID-19 issues		McDermott Center; San Antonio, TX
December 14, 2020*; 6:00 pm, WAC DN		Texas A&M International	W 89–51	5–2	UTRGV Fieldhouse (0); Edinburg, TX
December 21, 2020*; 6:00 pm, WAC DN		Sam Houston State	L 66–69	5–3	UTRGV Fieldhouse (131); Edinburg, TX
January 5, 2021; 7:00 pm, WAC DN		Dallas Christian College	Postponed		Bert Ogden Arena; Edinburg, TX
January 7, 2021*; 6:00 pm, WAC DN		St. Mary's (TX)	W 96–67	6–3	UTRGV Fieldhouse (160); Edinburg, TX
WAC regular season
January 8, 2021; WAC DN		at Chicago State	Canceled		Jones Convocation Center; Chicago, IL
January 9, 2021; WAC DN		at Chicago State	Canceled		Jones Convocation Center; Chicago, IL
January 15, 2021; 6:00 pm, WAC DN		Dixie State	W 82–49	7–3 (1–0)	UTRGV Fieldhouse (185); Edinburg, TX
January 16, 2021; 6:00 pm, WAC DN		Dixie State	W 72–65	8–3 (2–0)	UTRGV Fieldhouse (164); Edinburg, TX
January 22, 2021; WAC DN		at New Mexico State	Canceled		Pan American Center; Las Cruces, NM
January 23, 2021; WAC DN		at New Mexico State	Canceled		Pan American Center; Las Cruces, NM
February 5, 2021; 7:00 pm, WAC DN		Grand Canyon	Canceled		Bert Ogden Arena; Edinburg, TX
February 6, 2021; 7:00 pm, WAC DN		Grand Canyon	Canceled		Bert Ogden Arena; Edinburg, TX
February 6, 2021*; 7:00 pm, WAC DN		Texas Southern	L 75–77	8–4	Bert Ogden Arena (473); Edinburg, TX
February 12, 2021; 8:00 pm, WAC DN		at California Baptist	Canceled		CBU Events Center; Riverside, CA
February 13, 2021; 8:00 pm, WAC DN		at California Baptist	Canceled		CBU Events Center; Riverside, CA
February 19, 2021; 6:00 pm, WAC DN		Seattle	Canceled		UTRGV Fieldhouse; Edinburg, TX
February 20, 2021; 7:00 pm, WAC DN		Seattle	Canceled		UTRGV Fieldhouse; Edinburg, TX
February 21, 2021; 5:00 pm		Dallas Christian College rescheduled from January 5	W 116–51	9–4	UTRGV Fieldhouse (55); Edinburg, TX
February 26, 2021; 7:00 pm, WAC DN		at Utah Valley	L 74–78	9–5 (2–1)	UCCU Center (646); Orem, UT
February 27, 2021; 7:00 pm, WAC DN		at Utah Valley	L 64–73	9–6 (2–2)	UCCU Center (705); Orem, UT
March 2, 2021; 12:00 pm, WAC DN		at New Mexico State	L 51–69	9–7 (2–3)	Don Haskins Center (0); El Paso, TX
March 5, 2021; 6:00 pm, WAC DN		Tarleton State	L 47–65	9–8 (2–4)	UTRGV Fieldhouse (510); Edinburg, TX
March 6, 2021; 7:00 pm, WAC DN		Tarleton State	L 58–69	9–9 (2–5)	UTRGV Fieldhouse; Edinburg, TX
WAC tournament
March 10, 2021; 10:00 pm, ESPN+	(6)	vs. (3) New Mexico State; Quarterfinals	L 61–77	9–10	Orleans Arena; Paradise, NV
*Non-conference game. ^{#}Rankings from AP Poll. (#) Tournament seedings in parentheses. All times are in Central.
