= 2020–21 California Baptist Lancers men's basketball team =

American college basketball season

2020–21 California Baptist Lancers men's basketball
- Conference: Western Athletic Conference
- Record: 13–10 (6–6 WAC)
- Head coach: Rick Croy (8th season)
- Associate head coach: Hardy Asprilla
- Assistant coaches: Adam Jacobsen; Geoffrey McIntosh
- Home arena: CBU Events Center

2020–21 WAC men's basketball standings
	Conf.				Overall
Team	W		L	PCT	W		L	PCT
Grand Canyon †	9	–	3	.750	17	–	7	.708
Utah Valley	9	–	4	.692	11	–	11	.500
New Mexico State	7	–	6	.538	12	–	8	.600
California Baptist*	6	–	6	.500	13	–	10	.565
Seattle	4	–	5	.444	12	–	11	.522
Tarleton State*	5	–	7	.417	10	–	10	.500
Dixie State*	4	–	10	.286	8	–	13	.381
Texas–Rio Grande Valley	2	–	5	.286	9	–	10	.474
Chicago State	0	–	0	–	0	–	9	.000
† 2021 WAC tournament winner * Ineligible for the 2021 NCAA tournament due to transition period Chicago State suspended their season on December 23, 2020

The 2020–21 California Baptist Lancers men's basketball team represented California Baptist University in the 2020–21 NCAA Division I men's basketball season. The Lancers, led by eighth-year head coach Rick Croy, played their home games at the CBU Events Center in Riverside, California as members of the Western Athletic Conference.

The season marked CBU's third year of a four-year transition period from Division II to Division I. As a result, the Lancers were not eligible for NCAA postseason play, but could participate in the WAC tournament. They were eligible to play in the CIT or CBI, but not invited.

== Previous season ==
The Lancers finished the 2019–20 season finished the season 21–10, 10–6 in WAC play to finish in second place.

== Roster ==
2020–21 California Baptist Lancers men's basketball team
Players
Coaches

Pos.	#	Name	Height	Weight	Year	Hometown
G	1	Mark Carbone	6 ft 2 in (1.88 m)	190 lb (86 kg)	GS	Wethersfield, Connecticut
G	2	Tyree Ccampbell	6 ft 5 in (1.96 m)	185 lb (84 kg)	Fr	Etiwanda, California
G	3	Jermaine Miranda	6 ft 3 in (1.91 m)	200 lb (91 kg)	So	Juncos, Puerto Rico
G	4	Elijah Thomas	6 ft 5 in (1.96 m)	200 lb (91 kg)	GS	Peoria, Arizona
G	5	Reed Nottage	6 ft 6 in (1.98 m)	215 lb (98 kg)	So	Sydney, Australia
G	10	Jordan Caruso	6 ft 3 in (1.91 m)	185 lb (84 kg)	RS So	New York City, New York
G	11	Tre Armstrong	6 ft 5 in (1.96 m)	210 lb (95 kg)	So	Burnie, Tasmania
C	12	Gorjok Gak	6 ft 11 in (2.11 m)	235 lb (107 kg)	GS	Canberra, Sydney, Australia
G	13	Freddie Dybala	6 ft 3 in (1.91 m)	190 lb (86 kg)	Fr	Corona, California
G	14	Tobin Kund	6 ft 1 in (1.85 m)	185 lb (84 kg)	Jr	Riverside, California
G	15	Suraj Gahir	6 ft 5 in (1.96 m)	185 lb (84 kg)	Fr	North Delta, British Columbia
F	21	Malik Wade	6 ft 8 in (2.03 m)	235 lb (107 kg)	RS Fr	Espírito Santo do Pinhal, Brazil
G	25	Ty Rowell	6 ft 2 in (1.88 m)	190 lb (86 kg)	RS Jr	Langley, British Columbia
F	32	Juhlawnei Stone	6 ft 7 in (2.01 m)	230 lb (104 kg)	Fr	Lancaster, California
C	34	Russell Barlow	6 ft 10 in (2.08 m)	240 lb (109 kg)	Jr	Dallas, Texas
F	35	Te'Jon Sawyer	6 ft 8 in (2.03 m)	270 lb (122 kg)	Fr	San Francisco, California

Head coach

- Rick Croy (Azusa Pacific)

Assistant coach(es)

- Hardy Asprilla (Cal State Fullerton)
- Adam Jacobsen (Pacific)
- Geoffrey McIntosh (Cal State Monterey Bay)

Legend

- (C) Team captain
- (S) Suspended
- (I) Ineligible
- (W) Walk-on
- Injured
- Current redshirt

Roster
Last update: January 1, 2021

== Schedule and results ==
Date time, TV	Rank^{#}	Opponent^{#}	Result	Record	Site (attendance) city, state
Regular season
November 25, 2020*; 6:00 pm, P12N		at USC	L 87–95 ^{OT}	0–1	Galen Center; Los Angeles, CA
December 2, 2020*; 7:00 pm		Southeastern Louisiana	L 80–81	0–2	CBU Events Center; Riverside, CA
December 4, 2020*; 2:00 pm		Southeastern Louisiana	W 83–66	1–2	CBU Events Center; Riverside, CA
December 8, 2020*		UC Davis	Canceled due to COVID-19 issues		CBU Events Center; Riverside, CA
December 10, 2020*; 4:30 pm		Saint Katherine	W 93–47	2–2	CBU Events Center; Riverside, CA
December 12, 2020*; 3:00 pm		Fresno Pacific	W 110–71	3–2	CBU Events Center; Riverside, CA
December 16, 2020*		at Arizona	Canceled due to COVID-19 issues		McKale Center; Tucson, AZ
December 19, 2020*		Long Beach State	Canceled due to COVID-19 issues		CBU Events Center; Riverside, CA
December 21, 2020*		at Loyola Marymount	Canceled due to COVID-19 issues		Gersten Pavilion; Los Angeles, CA
January 8, 2021; 5:00 pm, WAC DN		at Utah Valley	L 50–77	3–3 (0–1)	UCCU Center; Orem, UT
January 9, 2021; 5:00 pm, WAC DN		at Utah Valley	L 77–81	3–4 (0–2)	UCCU Center; Orem, UT
January 15, 2021; 6:00 pm, WAC DN		Tarleton State	W 83–74	4–4 (1–2)	CBU Events Center; Riverside, CA
January 16, 2021; 6:00 pm, WAC DN		Tarleton State	W 73–67	5–4 (2–2)	CBU Events Center; Riverside, CA
January 20, 2021*; 6:00 pm, WAC DN		San Diego Christian	W 89–37	6–4	CBU Events Center; Riverside, CA
Jan 22, 2021; 11:00 a.m., WACDN		at Chicago State	Canceled due to COVID-19 issues		Jones Convocation Center; Chicago, IL
Jan 23, 2021; 10:00 a.m., WACDN		at Chicago State	Canceled due to COVID-19 issues		Jones Convocation Center; Chicago, IL
January 23, 2021*; 6:00 pm, WAC DN		Long Beach State	W 96–75	7–4	CBU Events Center; Riverside, CA
January 29, 2021; 6:00 pm, WAC DN		Dixie State	W 89–74	8–4 (3–2)	CBU Events Center; Riverside, CA
January 30, 2021; 6:00 pm, WAC DN		Dixie State	L 75–79	8–5 (3–3)	CBU Events Center; Riverside, CA
February 5, 2021; 6:00 pm, WAC DN		vs. New Mexico State	W 85–75	9–5 (4–3)	Antelope Gymnasium; Phoenix, AZ
February 6, 2021; 6:00 pm, WAC DN		vs. New Mexico State	L 70–97	9–6 (4–4)	Antelope Gymnasium; Phoenix, AZ
February 12, 2021; 6:00 pm, WAC DN		Texas–Rio Grande Valley	Canceled due to COVID-19 issues		CBU Events Center; Riverside, CA
February 13, 2021; 6:00 pm, WAC DN		Texas–Rio Grande Valley	Canceled due to COVID-19 issues		CBU Events Center; Riverside, CA
February 12, 2021*; 12:00 pm, WAC DN		Sacramento State	W 83–71	10–6	CBU Events Center; Riverside, CA
February 13, 2021*; 12:00 pm, WAC DN		Sacramento State	L 69–70	10–7	CBU Events Center; Riverside, CA
February 19, 2021; 6:00 pm, WAC DN		at Grand Canyon	L 61–71	10–8 (4–5)	GCU Arena (723); Phoenix, AZ
February 20, 2021; 6:00 pm, WAC DN		at Grand Canyon	W 65–62	11–8 (5–5)	GCU Arena (723); Phoenix, AZ
February 27, 2021*; 12:00 pm, WAC DN		Vanguard	W 78–65	12–8	CBU Events Center; Riverside, CA
March 5, 2021; 6:00 pm, WAC DN		Seattle	L 79–80	12–9 (5–6)	CBU Events Center; Riverside, CA
March 6, 2021; 6:00 pm, WAC DN		Seattle	W 79–76	13–9 (6–6)	CBU Events Center; Riverside, CA
WAC tournament
Mar 10, 2021; 4:30 pm, ESPN+	(4)	vs. (5) Seattle; Quarterfinals	L 66–83	13–10	Orleans Arena; Paradise, NV
*Non-conference game. ^{#}Rankings from AP Poll. (#) Tournament seedings in parentheses. All times are in Pacific.
