= 2021 WAC men's basketball tournament =

- Classification: Division I
- Season: 2020–21
- Teams: 6
- Site: Orleans Arena; Paradise, Nevada
- Champions: Grand Canyon (1st title)
- Winning coach: Bryce Drew (1st title)
- MVP: Jovan Blacksher Jr. (Grand Canyon)
- Television: ESPN+, ESPNU

2020–21 WAC men's basketball standings
	Conf.				Overall
Team	W		L	PCT	W		L	PCT
Grand Canyon †	9	–	3	.750	17	–	7	.708
Utah Valley	9	–	4	.692	11	–	11	.500
New Mexico State	7	–	6	.538	12	–	8	.600
California Baptist*	6	–	6	.500	13	–	10	.565
Seattle	4	–	5	.444	12	–	11	.522
Tarleton State*	5	–	7	.417	10	–	10	.500
Dixie State*	4	–	10	.286	8	–	13	.381
Texas–Rio Grande Valley	2	–	5	.286	9	–	10	.474
Chicago State	0	–	0	–	0	–	9	.000
† 2021 WAC tournament winner * Ineligible for the 2021 NCAA tournament due to transition period Chicago State suspended their season on December 23, 2020

The 2021 WAC men's basketball tournament was the postseason men's basketball tournament for the Western Athletic Conference during the 2020–21 season. All tournament games were played at the Orleans Arena in Paradise, Nevada, from March 11–13, 2021. The tournament champion received the WAC's automatic bid to the 2021 NCAA tournament.

== Seeds ==
6 of the 9 teams in the WAC were eligible to compete in the conference tournament. Dixie State and Tarleton State were ineligible due to their transition from Division II to Division I. California Baptist is eligible for the WAC basketball tournament this year after a change in rules from the WAC Board of Directors, which changed the transition period from four years to two years to compete in the conference tournament. CBU would still have to wait two more years to be able to compete in the NCAA Tournament. Chicago State cancelled their season after going 0–9, so they did not compete in the conference tournament. Teams were seeded by record within the conference, with a tiebreaker system to seed teams with identical conference records.

Seed	School	Conference	Tiebreaker	Tiebreaker 2
1	Grand Canyon	9–3		
2	Utah Valley	9–4		
3	New Mexico State	7–6		
4	California Baptist	6–6		
5	Seattle	4–5		
6	UTRGV	2–5		

== Schedule and results ==
Game	Time	Matchup	Score	Television
Quarterfinals – Thursday, March 11
1	4:30 pm	No. 4 California Baptist vs No. 5 Seattle	66–83	ESPN+
2	8:00 pm	No. 3 New Mexico State vs No. 6 UTRGV	77–61	ESPN+
Semifinals – Friday, March 12
3	5:00 pm	No. 1 Grand Canyon vs. No. 5 Seattle	81–47	ESPN+
4	8:00 pm	No. 2 Utah Valley vs. No. 3 New Mexico State	62–78	ESPN+
Final – Saturday, March 13
5	7:00 pm	No. 1 Grand Canyon vs. No. 3 New Mexico State	74–56	ESPNU
Game times in PST. Rankings denote tournament seed.

== Bracket ==
Quarterfinals; Thursday, March 11; ESPN+
4	Cal Baptist	66
5	Seattle	83
3	New Mexico State	77
6	UTRGV	61

Semifinals; Friday, March 12; ESPN+
1	Grand Canyon	81
5	Seattle	47
2	Utah Valley	62
3	New Mexico State	78

Championship; Saturday, March 13; ESPNU
1	Grand Canyon	74
3	New Mexico State	56
