= 2020–21 Seattle Redhawks men's basketball team =

American college basketball season

2020–21 Seattle Redhawks men's basketball
- Conference: Western Athletic Conference
- Record: 12–11 (4–5 WAC)
- Head coach: Jim Hayford (4th season)
- Assistant coaches: Chris Victor; Alex Pribble; Sam Kirby
- Home arena: Redhawk Center

2020–21 WAC men's basketball standings
	Conf.				Overall
Team	W		L	PCT	W		L	PCT
Grand Canyon †	9	–	3	.750	17	–	7	.708
Utah Valley	9	–	4	.692	11	–	11	.500
New Mexico State	7	–	6	.538	12	–	8	.600
California Baptist*	6	–	6	.500	13	–	10	.565
Seattle	4	–	5	.444	12	–	11	.522
Tarleton State*	5	–	7	.417	10	–	10	.500
Dixie State*	4	–	10	.286	8	–	13	.381
Texas–Rio Grande Valley	2	–	5	.286	9	–	10	.474
Chicago State	0	–	0	–	0	–	9	.000
† 2021 WAC tournament winner * Ineligible for the 2021 NCAA tournament due to transition period Chicago State suspended their season on December 23, 2020

The 2020–21 Seattle Redhawks men's basketball team represented Seattle University during the 2020–21 NCAA Division I men's basketball season. The Redhawks, led by fourth-year head coach Jim Hayford, played their home games at the Redhawk Center as members of the Western Athletic Conference.

== Previous season ==
They finished the season 14–15, 7–7 in WAC play to finish in a tie for fifth place. Due to irregularities in conference standings due to cancelled games, they were set to be the No. 3 seed in the WAC tournament, however, the tournament was cancelled amid the COVID-19 pandemic.

== Roster ==
2020–21 Seattle Redhawks men's basketball team
Players
Coaches

Pos.	#	Name	Height	Weight	Year	Hometown
G	0	Rip Economou	6 ft 8 in (2.03 m)	190 lb (86 kg)	Jr	Santa Monica, CA
G	1	Vasja Pandža	6 ft 8 in (2.03 m)	210 lb (95 kg)	Fr	Leeds, England
G	2	Trey Hopkins	6 ft 3 in (1.91 m)	180 lb (82 kg)	Jr	Midwest City, OK
F	5	Joe Wall	6 ft 7 in (2.01 m)	215 lb (98 kg)	RS So	Portland, OR
G	10	Aaron Nettles	6 ft 0 in (1.83 m)	175 lb (79 kg)	Sr	Seattle, WA
G/F	11	Riley Grigsby	6 ft 6 in (1.98 m)	220 lb (100 kg)	Jr	San Jose, CA
G	12	Darrion Trammell	5 ft 10 in (1.78 m)	165 lb (75 kg)	So	Marin City, CA
G	13	Angelo Stuart	6 ft 1 in (1.85 m)	165 lb (75 kg)	So	Queens, NY
F	14	Matt Vail	6 ft 5 in (1.96 m)	190 lb (86 kg)	RS So	Stanwood, WA
F	15	Emeka Udenyi	6 ft 6 in (1.98 m)	225 lb (102 kg)	Jr	Oakland, CA
C	21	Viktor Rajković	6 ft 6 in (1.98 m)	210 lb (95 kg)	Fr	Mill Valley, CA
G	23	Daron Henson	6 ft 8 in (2.03 m)	205 lb (93 kg)	GS	Pasadena, CA
G	24	Nate Robinson	6 ft 4 in (1.93 m)	185 lb (84 kg)	Jr	Walnut Creek, CA
F	25	Jared Pearre	6 ft 8 in (2.03 m)	205 lb (93 kg)	RS Fr	McKinney, TX
G	30	Tiago Zibecchi	6 ft 6 in (1.98 m)	200 lb (91 kg)	RS Jr	Rio de Janeiro, Brazil
G	31	Robert Hutchens	6 ft 4 in (1.93 m)	190 lb (86 kg)	Fr	Arroyo Grande, CA
G	33	Kobe Williamson	6 ft 8 in (2.03 m)	225 lb (102 kg)	Fr	Melbourne, Australia
G	35	Matthew Levis	6 ft 1 in (1.85 m)	175 lb (79 kg)	Fr	Portland, OR
G	41	Jaren Nafarrete	5 ft 7 in (1.7 m)	140 lb (64 kg)	RS Fr	San Diego, CA

Head coach

- Jim Hayford (Azusa Pacific)

Assistant coach(es)

- Chris Victor (Concordia–Irvine)
- Alex Pribble (California)
- Sam Kirby (Seattle)

Legend

- (C) Team captain
- (S) Suspended
- (I) Ineligible
- (W) Walk-on
- Injured
- Current redshirt

Roster
Last update: January 4, 2021

== Schedule and results ==
Date time, TV	Rank^{#}	Opponent^{#}	Result	Record	Site (attendance) city, state
Regular season
November 25, 2020*; 8:00 pm		at Portland; Portland Invitational	W 84–72	1–0	Chiles Center (0); Portland, OR
November 27, 2020*; 12:00 pm		vs. William Jessup; Portland Invitational	W 77–53	2–0	Chiles Center (0); Portland, OR
November 29, 2020*; 12:00 pm, FloSports		vs. Air Force; Vegas Bubble	W 63–45	3–0	T-Mobile Arena (0); Paradise, NV
November 30, 2020*; 2:00 pm, FloSports		vs. Cal State Northridge; Vegas Bubble	L 65–76	3–1	T-Mobile Arena (0); Paradise, NV
December 3, 2020*; 5:00 pm, P12N		at UCLA	L 52–78	3–2	Pauley Pavilion (0); Los Angeles, CA
December 6, 2020*; 2:00 pm		at Long Beach State	L 75–80	3–3	Walter Pyramid (0); Long Beach, CA
December 9, 2020*; 8:00 pm, P12N		vs. Washington	L 41–73	3–4	Alaska Airlines Arena (0); Seattle, WA
December 13, 2020*; 6:00 pm		Northwest	W 89–40	4–4	Redhawk Center (0); Seattle, WA
December 15, 2020*; 6:00 pm		Corban University	Canceled due to COVID-19 issues		Redhawk Center; Seattle, WA
December 17, 2020*; 6:00 pm		College of Idaho	W 78–54	5–4	Redhawk Center (0); Seattle, WA
December 22, 2020*; 2:00 pm, P12N		at California	L 65–70	5–5	Haas Pavilion (0); Berkeley, CA
December 30, 2020*; 6:00 pm		Portland	W 84–68	6–5	Redhawk Center (0); Seattle, WA
January 9, 2021*; 6:00 pm		Saint Martin's	W 98–63	7–5	Redhawk Center; Seattle, WA
WAC regular season
January 15, 2021; 6:00 pm, ESPN+		Utah Valley	L 92–93 ^{OT}	7–6 (0–1)	Redhawk Center; Seattle, WA
January 16, 2021; 6:00 pm, ESPN+		Utah Valley	Canceled due to COVID-19		Redhawk Center; Seattle, WA
January 22, 2021; 5:00 pm, WAC DN		at Tarleton State	Canceled due to COVID-19		Wisdom Gym; Stephenville, TX
January 23, 2021; 5:00 pm, WAC DN		at Tarleton State	Canceled due to COVID-19		Wisdom Gym; Stephenville, TX
January 29, 2021; 6:00 pm		at Chicago State	Canceled due to COVID-19 issues		Redhawk Center; Seattle, WA
January 30, 2021; 6:00 pm		at Chicago State	Canceled due to COVID-19 issues		Redhawk Center; Seattle, WA
February 5, 2021; 5:00 pm, WAC DN		at Dixie State	L 76–77	7–7 (0–2)	Burns Arena (582); St. George, UT
February 6, 2021; 5:00 pm, WAC DN		at Dixie State	W 77–56	8–7 (1–2)	Burns Arena (645); St. George, UT
February 12, 2021; 6:00 pm, ESPN+		New Mexico State	W 83–72	9–7 (2–2)	Redhawk Center; Seattle, WA
February 13, 2021; 6:00 pm, ESPN+		New Mexico State	L 58–65	9–8 (2–3)	Redhawk Center; Seattle, WA
February 19, 2021; 5:00 pm, WAC DN		at Texas–Rio Grande Valley	Canceled due to COVID-19		UTRGV Fieldhouse; Edinburg, TX
February 20, 2021; 5:00 pm, WAC DN		at Texas–Rio Grande Valley	Canceled due to COVID-19		UTRGV Fieldhouse; Edinburg, TX
February 26, 2021; 6:00 pm, ESPN+		Grand Canyon	W 63–57	10–8 (3–3)	Redhawk Center; Seattle, WA
February 27, 2021; 6:00 pm, ESPN+		Grand Canyon	L 71–81	10–9 (3–4)	Redhawk Center; Seattle, WA
March 5, 2021; 6:00 pm, ESPN+		at California Baptist	W 80–79	11–9 (4–4)	CBU Events Center; Riverside, CA
March 6, 2021; 6:00 pm, WAC DN		at California Baptist	L 76–79	11–10 (4–5)	CBU Events Center; Riverside, CA
WAC tournament
March 11, 2021; 4:30 pm, ESPN+	(5)	vs. (4) California Baptist; Quarterfinals	W 83–66	12–10	Orleans Arena; Paradise, NV
March 12, 2021; 5:00 pm, ESPN+	(5)	vs. (1) Grand Canyon; Semifinals	L 47–81	12–11	Orleans Arena; Paradise, NV
*Non-conference game. ^{#}Rankings from AP Poll. (#) Tournament seedings in parentheses. All times are in Pacific Time.

Schedule source:
