= American Indian College =

Private Christian college in Phoenix, Arizona

Nelson American Indian College
- Type: Private college
- Established: 1957; 69 years ago
- Religious affiliation: Assemblies of God
- President: Jonathan Gannon
- Students: 175
- Location: Phoenix, Arizona, United States; 33°34′39″N 112°05′32″W
- Campus: Urban
- Sporting affiliations: NCCAA
- Website: aicag.edu
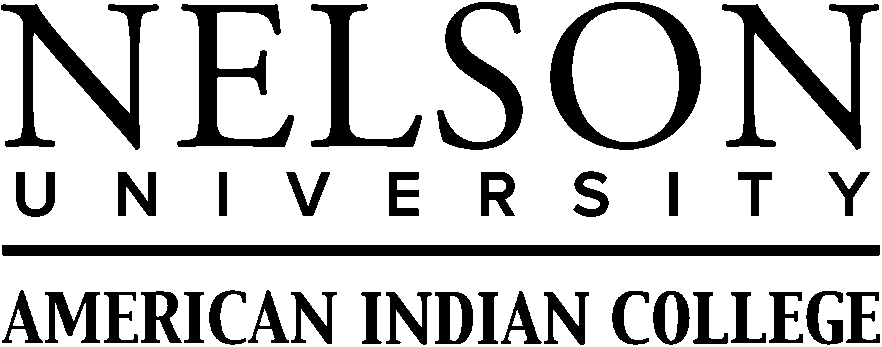

Nelson American Indian College (Nelson AIC) is a private Christian college in Phoenix, Arizona, United States. It was originally founded in 1957 by missionary Alta Washburn, who saw a need to prepare Native Americans for church ministry. Nelson AIC educates students from about 25 tribes but welcomes students of all ethnicities. It is a regional Assemblies of God college. In 2016, it became a campus of Nelson University (formerly Southwestern Assemblies of God University, or SAGU) and now shares that university's accreditation by the Southern Association of Colleges and Schools Commission on Colleges (SACSCOC).

== History ==
Nelson AIC was established in 1957 as a Bible institute. Over years of Pentecostal ministry, it has changed location three times and has grown into a regionally accredited college offering multiple degree programs. In September 2007, to commemorate the fiftieth anniversary of the college's establishment, Nelson AIC began a new "Jubilee Walkway" connecting the parking lot with the Henson Memorial Chapel. In 2016, AIC partnered with Nelson University, formerly Southwestern Assemblies of God University (SAGU), in Waxahachie, Texas, becoming Nelson AIC.

== Academics ==
Nelson AIC offers several on-campus degree programs: Associate in Arts, Associate in Science, Bachelor of Arts, and Bachelor of Science. The academic department chairs for each major hold an earned doctorate and all full-time faculty hold at least a master's degree in their field.

Nelson AIC offers its students several opportunities for ministry: Semester outreach programs are offered throughout Arizona. There are summer ministry traveling teams throughout the country and abroad. Finally, there are also local church opportunities.

== Campus ==
The campus centers around the Alta Washburn multi-purpose building, built in 1972, which houses the Dorothy L. Cummings Library and the John McPherson Education Center. The Henson Memorial Chapel, finished in 1978, is an arrowhead-shaped building that houses both a chapel and the offices of the president, dean of students, and director of student services. Most classes take place in the Lee Academic Center. Other notable buildings include the Charles W.H. Scott Student Center, the Rodger Cree Student Union, the Washburn and Gannon Dormitories, and the Ramsey Cafeteria.

== Student life ==
All Nelson AIC students are required to participate in religious activities regularly. The college requires attendance at all chapel services and weekly dormitory devotions. Nelson AIC encourages students to be fully committed Christians in all aspects of life. Student organizations include the Associated Student Body.

=== Athletics ===
Nelson AIC has men's basketball and baseball, men's and women's soccer, plus women's basketball and softball. There is a gymnasium on campus where students can participate in athletic activities or practice. The Nelson AIC Warriors won the men's basketball NCCAA National Championship in 2024.
