= UT Rio Grande Valley Vaqueros men's basketball statistical leaders =

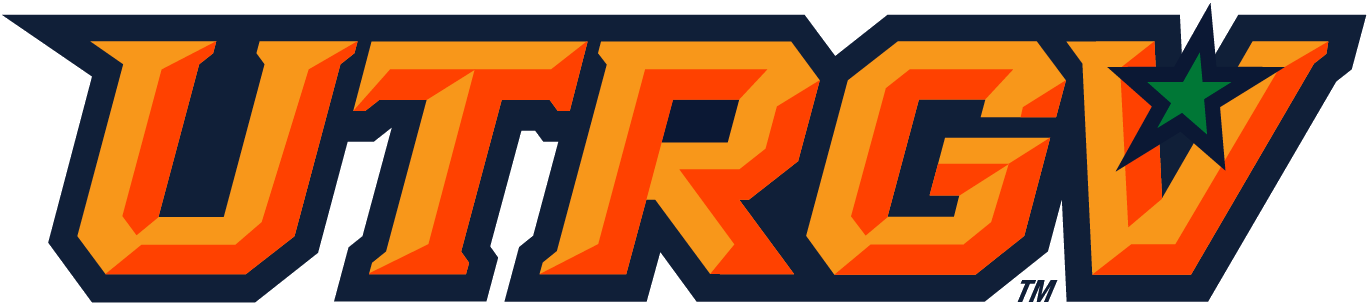

The UT Rio Grande Valley Vaqueros men's basketball statistical leaders are individual statistical leaders of the Texas–Rio Grande Valley Vaqueros men's basketball program in various categories, including points, three-pointers, assists, blocks, rebounds, and steals. Within those areas, the lists identify single-game, single-season, and career leaders. As of the next college basketball season in 2024–25, the Vaqueros represent the University of Texas Rio Grande Valley (UTRGV) in the NCAA Division I Southland Conference.

UTRGV did not formally exist until 2013, and did not begin operation until 2015. The school was established by the merger of two campuses of the University of Texas System—the University of Texas at Brownsville (UTB) and University of Texas–Pan American (UTPA). Before the merger, UTB was a member of the National Association of Intercollegiate Athletics (NAIA), competing as the UT Brownsville Ocelots, while UTPA competed as the Texas–Pan American (or UT Pan American) Broncs in NCAA Division I. Before the merger took full effect, the UT System announced that the UTPA athletic program would transfer directly to UTRGV, with the new school thus fully inheriting UTPA's athletic history. In turn, this means that the history of UTRGV men's basketball officially begins with UTPA's first season of intercollegiate basketball in 1952–53 (when that school was known as Pan American College). The NCAA did not officially record assists as a stat until the 1983–84 season, and blocks and steals until the 1985–86 season, but the UTRGV record books include players in these stats before these seasons. These lists are updated through the end of the 2023–24 season.

== Scoring ==
Career
Rk	Player	Points	Seasons
1	Otto Moore	1,880	1964–65 1965–66 1966–67 1967–68
2	Luke Jackson	1,858	1961–62 1962–63 1963–64
3	Brian Merriweather	1,738	1998–99 1999–00 2000–01
4	Fred Taylor	1,721	1967–68 1968–69 1969–70
5	Marshall Rogers	1,507	1974–75 1975–76
6	Mitchell Edwards	1,423	1962–63 1963–64 1964–65
7	Shaquille Hines	1,325	2012–13 2013–14 2014–15 2015–16
8	Anthony Eatmon	1,309	1963–64 1964–65 1965–66 1966–67
9	Melvin Thomas	1,306	1987–88 1988–89 1989–90
10	Ellis Appling	1,290	1959–60 1960-61 1961-62

Season
Rk	Player	Points	Season
1	Marshall Rogers	919	1975–76
2	Luke Jackson	836	1963–64
3	Luke Jackson	792	1962–63
4	Mire Chatman	760	2001–02
5	Bruce King	681	1973–74
6	Fred Taylor	671	1969–70
7	Nick Dixon	670	2017–18
8	Otto Moore	664	1967–68
9	Brian Merriweather	641	1998–99
10	Michael Edwards	631	1977–78

Single game
Rk	Player	Points	Season	Opponent
1	Marshall Rogers	58	1975–76	Texas Lutheran
2	Bruce King	55	1973–74	Baptist
3	Luke Jackson	51	1962–63	Western Illinois
4	Bruce King	49	1973–74	Tulsa
5	Marshall Rogers	48	1975–76	Texas-Arlington
6	Marshall Rogers	47	1975–76	Hawaii
7	Mire Chatman	46	2001–02	Texas A&M-Corpus Christi
	Marshall Rogers	46	1974–75	Baptist
9	Mire Chatman	46	2001–02	New Mexico State
	Bruce King	44	1973–74	Oral Roberts

== Rebounds ==
Career
Rk	Player	Rebounds	Seasons
1	Otto Moore	1,679	1964–65 1965–66 1966–67 1967–68
2	Luke Jackson	1,427	1961–62 1962–63 1963–64
3	Jim McGurk	948	1960–61 1961–62 1962–63 1963–64
4	Anthony Eatmon	836	1963–64 1964–65 1965–66 1966–67
5	Frank Lorthridge	804	1968–69 1969–70 1970–71
6	Carlos McCullough	785	1971–72 1972–73 1973–74
7	Fred Taylor	699	1967–68 1968–69 1969–70
8	Pete Perry	670	1971–72 1972–73
9	Henry Taylor	664	1976–77 1977–78
10	Calvin Oliver	646	1968–69 1969–70 1970–71
	Kenneth Green	646	1979–80 1980–81

Season
Rk	Player	Rebounds	Season
1	Luke Jackson	626	1962–63
2	Luke Jackson	618	1963–64
3	Otto Moore	562	1965–66
4	Walter Sampson	529	1959–60
5	Otto Moore	497	1967–68
6	Otto Moore	463	1966–67
7	Howard Montgomery	398	1961–62
8	Pete Perry	388	1972–73
9	Henry Taylor	368	1977–78
10	Carlos McCullough	358	1972–73
	Carlos McCullough	358	1972–73

Single game
Rk	Player	Rebounds	Season	Opponent
1	Otto Moore	35	1966–67	Lamar Tech
2	Walter Sampson	34	1959–60	Huston-Tillotson
3	Otto Moore	31	1967–68	Trinity
4	Otto Moore	30	1967–68	Jackson State
	Luke Jackson	30	1962–63	East Texas Baptist
6	Otto Moore	29	1967–68	Illinois State
7	Luke Jackson	28	1962–63	Corpus Christi
8	Otto Moore	27	1965–66	LeTourneau
9	Otto Moore	26	1966–67	St. Benedict’s
	Luke Jackson	26	1963–64	St. Edward’s

== Assists ==
Career
Rk	Player	Assists	Seasons
1	Jesus Guerra	771	1972–73 1973–74 1974–75 1975–76
2	John Wilbanks	634	1976–77 1977–78
3	Paul Friddle	601	1958–59 1959–60 1960–61 1961–62 1962–63
4	Javon Levi	599	2017–18 2018–19 2019–20 2020–21
5	Mike Carroll	511	1979–80 1980–81
6	Lalo Rios	444	1995–96 1996–97 1997–98 1998–99
7	Nick Weiermiller	409	2007–08 2008–09 2009–10 2011–12
8	Paul Stoll	378	2006–07 2007–08
9	Greg Black	362	1993–94 1994–95
10	Kirk Brown	310	1970–71 1971–72

Season
Rk	Player	Assists	Season
1	John Wilbanks	323	1977–78
2	John Wilbanks	311	1976–77
3	Jesus Guerra	289	1975–76
4	Mike Carroll	275	1980–81
5	Mike Carroll	236	1979–80
6	Paul Stoll	224	2007–08
7	Javon Levi	211	2018–19
8	Greg Black	202	1993–94
9	Javon Levi	199	2019–20
10	Jesus Guerra	189	1974–75

Single game
Rk	Player	Assists	Season	Opponent
1	John Wilbanks	22	1976–77	Arkansas State
2	John Wilbanks	20	1977–78	Southwestern Louisiana
	Jesus Guerra	20	1974–75	Denver
4	John Wilbanks	19	1977–78	Texas A&I
	John Wilbanks	19	1976–77	Hardin-Simmons
6	John Wilbanks	17	1976–77	New Mexico State
7	Mike Carroll	16	1980–81	East Carolina
	John Wilbanks	16	1976–77	Hardin-Simmons
	Jesus Guerra	16	1975–76	Texas-Arlington
	Jesus Guerra	16	1975–76	Hardin-Simmons

== Steals ==
Career
Rk	Player	Steals	Seasons
1	Javon Levi	244	2017–18 2018–19 2019–20 2020–21
2	Lalo Rios	231	1995–96 1996–97 1997–98 1998–99
3	Mire Chatman	183	2000–01 2001–02
4	Greg Black	176	1993–94 1994–95
5	Lesley Varner II	156	2016–17 2017–18 2018–19 2019–20
6	John Wilbanks	149	1976–77 1977–78
7	Brian Merriweather	139	1998–99 1999–00 2000–01
8	Paul Stoll	133	2006–07 2007–08
9	Eric Montalvo	132	2001–02 2002–03 2003–04 2004–05
	Gilbert King	132	1974–75 1975–76

Season
Rk	Player	Steals	Season
1	Javon Levi	109	2018–19
2	Mire Chatman	105	2001–02
3	Greg Black	94	1994–95
4	Gilbert King	89	1975–76
5	Michael Anderson	87	1985–86
6	Greg Black	82	1993–94
7	Paul Stoll	79	2007–08
8	Mire Chatman	78	2000–01
9	John Wilbanks	76	1976–77
10	John Wilbanks	73	1977–78

Single game
Rk	Player	Steals	Season	Opponent
1	John Wilbanks	10	1977–78	Texas A&I
2	Paul Stoll	9	2007–08	New Jersey Institute of Technology
	Greg Black	9	1994–95	Minnesota-Duluth
4	Mire Chatman	8	2001–02	New Mexico State
	Mire Chatman	8	2001–02	Sul Ross State
	Greg Black	8	1993–94	Arkansas-Little Rock
	Arturo Ormond	8	1990–91	Grambling State
	Tyrone Scott	8	1985–86	U.S. International
	Gilbert King	8	1975–76	Houston Baptist
10	Elijah Elliott	7	2023–24	South Dakota
	Javon Levi	7	2020–21	Utah Valley
	Lesley Varner II	7	2019–20	California Baptist
	Javon Levi	7	2018–19	Texas Southern
	Javon Levi	7	2018–19	Seattle U
	Shaquille Boga	7	2013–14	Bakersfield
	Paul Stoll	7	2006–07	IPFW

== Blocks ==
Career
Rk	Player	Blocks	Seasons
1	Pete Perry	216	1971–72 1972–73
2	Melvin Thomas	107	1987–88 1988–89 1989–90
3	Dan Kimasa	98	2014–15 2015–16 2016–17 2017–18
4	Shaquille Hines	74	2012–13 2013–14 2014–15 2015–16
5	Matt Palmquist	70	1996–97 1997–98 1998–99 1999–00
6	Chris Jones	66	1989–90 1990–91 1991–92
7	Danny Salisbury	58	1977–78 1978–79
	Terrell Hill	58	2000–01 2001–02
9	Anthony White	54	1985–86 1986–87
10	Marcus Quinn	51	2000–01 2001–02

Season
Rk	Player	Blocks	Season
1	Pete Perry	120	1972–73
2	Pete Perry	96	1971–72
3	Travis Ross	46	1971–72
4	Dan Kimasa	44	2014–15
5	Melvin Thomas	42	1989–90
6	Dima Zdor	40	2022–23
7	Danny Salisbury	39	1978–79
8	Koree Cotton	38	2025–26
9	Melvin Thomas	36	1988–89
	Anthony White	36	1986–87

Single game
Rk	Player	Blocks	Season	Opponent
1	Pete Perry	11	1971–72	Lamar
2	Pete Perry	9	1971–72	Tennessee Tech
3	Pete Perry	8	1971–72	Southern Mississippi
4	Melvin Thomas	7	1988–89	Texas Lutheran
	Pete Perry	7	1972–73	Southwestern
	Pete Perry	7	1971–72	Lamar
