= 2019–20 Chicago State Cougars men's basketball team =

American college basketball season

2019–20 Chicago State Cougars men's basketball
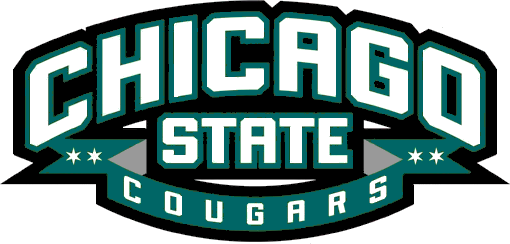
- Conference: Western Athletic Conference
- Record: 4–25 (0–14 WAC)
- Head coach: Lance Irvin (2nd season)
- Assistant coaches: Rodell Davis; Brett Putz
- Home arena: Jones Convocation Center

2019–20 WAC men's basketball standings
	Conf.				Overall
Team	W		L	PCT	W		L	PCT
New Mexico State	16	–	0	1.000	25	–	6	.806
California Baptist *	10	–	6	.625	21	–	10	.677
Texas–Rio Grande Valley	9	–	7	.563	14	–	16	.467
Kansas City	8	–	7	.533	16	–	14	.533
Seattle	7	–	7	.500	14	–	15	.483
Grand Canyon	8	–	8	.500	13	–	17	.433
Cal State Bakersfield	6	–	10	.375	12	–	19	.387
Utah Valley	5	–	10	.333	11	–	19	.367
Chicago State	0	–	14	.000	4	–	25	.138
* Ineligible for the 2020 NCAA tournament due to transition period. NOTE: The 2020 WAC tournament was canceled due to the COVID-19 pandemic.

The 2019–20 Chicago State Cougars men's basketball team represented Chicago State University in the 2019–20 NCAA Division I men's basketball season. The Cougars were led by second-year head coach Lance Irvin. They played their home games at the Emil and Patricia Jones Convocation Center as members of the Western Athletic Conference. They finished the season 4–25, 0–14 in WAC play to finish in last place. They were set to be the No. 8 seed in the WAC tournament, however, the tournament was cancelled amid the COVID-19 pandemic.

== Previous season ==
The 2018–19 Cougars finished the 2018–19 season 3–29, 0–16 in WAC play to finish in last place. They lost in the quarterfinals of the WAC tournament to New Mexico State.

For the third time in four years, the Cougars had the worst average point margin in Division I (−25.5 points).

== Roster ==
2019–20 Chicago State Cougars men's basketball team
Players
Coaches

Pos.	#	Name	Height	Weight	Year	Hometown
F	0	Rajeir Jones	6 ft 3 in (1.91 m)	190 lb (86 kg)	Fr	Baltimore, Maryland
G	1	Andrew Lewis	6 ft 3 in (1.91 m)	180 lb (82 kg)	Jr	Milwaukee, Wisconsin
G	2	Leondre Townsen	6 ft 5 in (1.96 m)	160 lb (73 kg)	Fr	Chicago, Illinois
G	3	Isaiah Lewis	6 ft 1 in (1.85 m)	155 lb (70 kg)	Fr	Romulus, Michigan
F	4	Ke'Sean Davis	6 ft 7 in (2.01 m)	210 lb (95 kg)	Jr	Compton, California
G	5	Xavier Johnson	5 ft 11 in (1.8 m)	160 lb (73 kg)	Jr	Dallas, Texas
F	10	Amir Gholizadeh	6 ft 6 in (1.98 m)	195 lb (88 kg)	Fr	Toronto, Ontario
F	11	Kalil Whitehead	6 ft 5 in (1.96 m)	195 lb (88 kg)	Fr	Detroit, Michigan
F	12	Carlo Marble	6 ft 5 in (1.96 m)	200 lb (91 kg)	Jr	West Des Moines, Iowa
F	13	Christian Jacob	6 ft 8 in (2.03 m)	230 lb (104 kg)	Sr	Gary, Indiana
F	15	Noah Bigirumwami	6 ft 10 in (2.08 m)	225 lb (102 kg)	RS Jr	Santa Clarita, California
G	22	Michael Johnson	6 ft 1 in (1.85 m)	180 lb (82 kg)	RS Jr	Chicago, Illinois
F	23	Jace Colley	6 ft 7 in (2.01 m)	200 lb (91 kg)	Jr	Preston, Nova Scotia
F	32	Eugene Witherspoon	6 ft 6 in (1.98 m)	200 lb (91 kg)	Sr	Chicago, IL
C	35	Solomon Hunt	6 ft 9 in (2.06 m)	272 lb (123 kg)	Jr	Pomona, California

Head coach

- Lance Irvin (Idaho)

Assistant coach(es)

- Rodell Davis (Iowa)
- Brett Putz (St. Cloud State)

Legend

- (C) Team captain
- (S) Suspended
- (I) Ineligible
- (W) Walk-on
- Injured
- Current redshirt

Roster
Last update: November 8, 2019

== Schedule and results ==
Date time, TV	Rank^{#}	Opponent^{#}	Result	Record	High points	High rebounds	High assists	Site (attendance) city, state
Non-conference regular season
Nov 5, 2019*; 7:05 pm		Judson	W 103–60	1–0	37 – X. Johnson	7 – Hunt	5 – Tied	Jones Convocation Center (407); Chicago, IL
Nov 9, 2019*; 2:05 pm		Loyola (MD)	L 85–98	1–1	19 – X. Johnson	9 – Davis	6 – X. Johnson	Jones Convocation Center (603); Chicago, IL
Nov 12, 2019*; 7:00 pm		at Eastern Illinois	L 34–98	1–2	14 – Lewis	6 – Colley	2 – Lewis	Lantz Arena (1,198); Charleston, IL
Nov 16, 2019*; 2:00 pm, BTN Plus		at Purdue; Emerald Coast Classic campus site game	L 49–93	1–3	12 – X. Johnson	5 – Jones	5 – X. Johnson	Mackey Arena (14,804); West Lafayette, IN
Nov 19, 2019*; 4:30 pm		Purdue-Northwest	W 89–77	2–3	18 – X. Johnson	10 – Colley	8 – X. Johnson	Jones Convocation Center (223); Chicago, IL
Nov 20, 2019*; 7:05 pm		North Park	W 79–66	3–3	22 – Colley	13 – Colley	4 – Colley	Jones Convocation Center (225); Chicago, IL
Nov 25, 2019*; 7:00 pm, ACCNX		at Florida State; Emerald Coast Classic campus site game	L 56–113	3–4	18 – Lewis	5 – Hunt	2 – Gholizadeh	Donald L. Tucker Civic Center (6,102); Tallahassee, FL
Nov 29, 2019*; 11:00 am, YouTube		vs. Jacksonville State; Emerald Coast Classic third round game	L 62–71	3–5	18 – Lewis	11 – Hunt	4 – Lewis	The Arena at NWFSC (230); Niceville, FL
Nov 30, 2019*; 10:00 am/12:30 pm, YouTube		vs. Alabama State; Emerald Coast Classic final round game	L 54–67	3–6	18 – Lewis	8 – Lewis	1 – Tied	The Arena at NWFSC (110); Niceville, FL
Dec 4, 2019*; 7:30 pm		at SIU Edwardsville	W 89–81	4–6	23 – X. Johnson	6 – Hunt	5 – X. Johnson	Vadalabene Center (607); Edwardsville, IL
Dec 6, 2019*; 12:00 pm		at Tennessee State	L 74–80	4–7	34 – X. Johnson	6 – Tied	2 – Tied	Gentry Complex (594); Nashville, TN
Dec 17, 2019*; 12:00 pm		Oral Roberts; WAC/Summit Challenge	L 59–97	4–8	19 – X. Johnson	11 – Colley	4 – Lewis	Jones Convocation Center (407); Chicago, IL
Dec 19, 2019*; 7:05 pm		Northern Illinois	L 60–75	4–9	15 – X. Johnson	7 – X. Johnson	5 – X. Johnson	Jones Convocation Center (255); Chicago, IL
Dec 22, 2019*; 2:00 pm		at Indiana State	L 64–85	4–10	17 – X. Johnson	10 – X. Johnson	4 – X. Johnson	Hulman Center (3,449); Terre Haute, IN
Dec 30, 2019*; 7:00 pm, SECN+		at Missouri	L 33–91	4–11	7 – Jones	7 – Davis	1 – Tied	Mizzou Arena (9,359); Columbia, MO
WAC Regular Season
Jan 2, 2020; 7:05 pm		Utah Valley	L 73–94	4–12 (0–1)	20 – X. Johnson	8 – Davis	3 – Davis	Jones Convocation Center (322); Chicago, IL
Jan 4, 2020; 12:00 pm		Seattle	L 54–86	4–13 (0–2)	18 – X. Johnson	7 – Hunt	2 – Tied	Jones Convocation Center (307); Chicago, IL
Jan 9, 2020; 8:00 pm		at New Mexico State	L 54–93	4–14 (0–3)	14 – X. Johnson	8 – Hunt	4 – Marble	Pan American Center (4,367); Las Cruces, NM
Jan 11, 2020; 7:00 pm		at Texas–Rio Grande Valley	L 63–87	4–15 (0–4)	12 – Tied	6 – Hunt	5 – X. Johnson	UTRGV Fieldhouse (1,085); Edinburg, TX
Jan 16, 2020; 7:00 pm		Grand Canyon	L 64–78	4–16 (0–5)	19 – Jones	4 – Tied	4 – Tied	Jones Convocation Center (444); Chicago, IL
Jan 19, 2020; 11:05 am		Cal State Bakersfield	L 54–72	4–17 (0–6)	17 – Jones	4 – Tied	2 – Tied	Jones Convocation Center (255); Chicago, IL
Jan 22, 2020; 9:00 pm		at California Baptist	L 53–85	4–18 (0–7)	14 – Gholizadeh	6 – Bigirumwami	2 – Davis	CBU Events Center (3,461); Riverside, CA
Feb 1, 2020; 12:00 pm		Kansas City	L 51–69	4–19 (0–8)	14 – Hunt	7 – Hunt	3 – X. Johnson	Jones Convocation Center (325); Chicago, IL
Feb 6, 2020; 7:05 pm		New Mexico State	L 49–71	4–20 (0–9)	12 – Lewis	6 – Hunt	3 – Hunt	Jones Convocation Center; Chicago, IL
Feb 8, 2020; 12:05 pm		Texas–Rio Grande Valley	L 64–75	4–21 (0–10)	22 – Lewis	6 – Marble	4 – X. Johnson	Jones Convocation Center; Chicago, IL
Feb 13, 2020; 9:00 pm		at Cal State Bakersfield	L 54–64	4–22 (0–11)	23 – Lewis	5 – Lewis	2 – Tied	Icardo Center (1,709); Bakersfield, CA
Feb 15, 2020; 7:00 pm		at Grand Canyon	L 47–71	4–23 (0–12)	18 – Gholizadeh	7 – Marble	4 – Jones	GCU Arena (6,888); Phoenix, AZ
Feb 22, 2020; 12:05 pm		California Baptist	L 53–95	4–24 (0–13)	11 – Hunt	6 – Hunt	3 – Jones	Jones Convocation Center (368); Chicago, IL
Feb 29, 2020; 6:00 pm		at Kansas City	L 58–80	4–25 (0–14)	18 – Davis	8 – Davis	2 – Davis	Swinney Recreation Center (1,599); Kansas City, MO
Mar 5, 2020; 9:00 pm		at Seattle	Cancelled due to the COVID-19 pandemic					Redhawk Center; Seattle, WA
Mar 7, 2020; 3:00 pm		at Utah Valley	Cancelled due to the COVID-19 pandemic					UCCU Center; Orem, UT
WAC tournament
Mar 12, 2020; 2:00 pm, ESPN+	(8)	vs. (1) New Mexico State; Quarterfinals	Cancelled due to the COVID-19 pandemic					Orleans Arena; Paradise, NV
*Non-conference game. ^{#}Rankings from AP Poll. (#) Tournament seedings in parentheses. All times are in Central.
