= 2019–20 Grand Canyon Antelopes men's basketball team =

American college basketball season

2019–20 Grand Canyon Antelopes men's basketball
- Conference: Western Athletic Conference
- Record: 13–17 (8–8 WAC)
- Head coach: Dan Majerle (7th season)
- Assistant coaches: Marvin Menzies; Chris Crevelone; Isaac Chew
- Home arena: GCU Arena

2019–20 WAC men's basketball standings
	Conf.				Overall
Team	W		L	PCT	W		L	PCT
New Mexico State	16	–	0	1.000	25	–	6	.806
California Baptist *	10	–	6	.625	21	–	10	.677
Texas–Rio Grande Valley	9	–	7	.563	14	–	16	.467
Kansas City	8	–	7	.533	16	–	14	.533
Seattle	7	–	7	.500	14	–	15	.483
Grand Canyon	8	–	8	.500	13	–	17	.433
Cal State Bakersfield	6	–	10	.375	12	–	19	.387
Utah Valley	5	–	10	.333	11	–	19	.367
Chicago State	0	–	14	.000	4	–	25	.138
* Ineligible for the 2020 NCAA tournament due to transition period. NOTE: The 2020 WAC tournament was canceled due to the COVID-19 pandemic.

The 2019–20 Grand Canyon Antelopes men's basketball team represented Grand Canyon University during the 2019–20 NCAA Division I men's basketball season. They were led by seventh-year head coach Dan Majerle and played their home games at GCU Arena in Phoenix, Arizona as members of the Western Athletic Conference (WAC). They finished the season 13–17, 8–8 in WAC play, to finish in a tie for fifth place. They were set to be the No. 4 seed in the WAC tournament; however, the tournament was canceled amid concerns over the coronavirus pandemic.

On March 13, 2020, the school fired Dan Majerle as head coach of the Antelopes. A few days later, the school named former Vanderbilt and Valparaiso head coach Bryce Drew as the Antelopes' next head coach.

== Previous season ==
The Antelopes finished the 2018–19 season 20–14, 10–6 in WAC play, to finish in third place. They defeated Seattle and Utah Valley to advance to the championship game of the WAC tournament where they lost to New Mexico State. They were invited to the College Basketball Invitational where they lost in the first round to West Virginia.

== Roster ==
2019–20 Grand Canyon Antelopes men's basketball team
Players
Coaches

Pos.	#	Name	Height	Weight	Year	Hometown
G	0	J.J. Rhymes	6 ft 4 in (1.93 m)	200 lb (91 kg)	RS Jr	Phoenix, AZ
G	1	Isiah Brown	6 ft 2 in (1.88 m)	180 lb (82 kg)	RS Jr	Lynnwood, WA
G	3	Mikey Dixon	6 ft 2 in (1.88 m)	165 lb (75 kg)	RS Jr	New Castle, DE
F	4	Oscar Frayer	6 ft 7 in (2.01 m)	195 lb (88 kg)	Sr	Oakland, CA
C	5	Louis Bangai	6 ft 10 in (2.08 m)	230 lb (104 kg)	RS Jr	Yaounde, Cameroon
G	10	Jovan Jr. Blacksher	5 ft 11 in (1.8 m)	155 lb (70 kg)	Fr	Oakland, CA
G	11	Jaylen Fisher	6 ft 2 in (1.88 m)	195 lb (88 kg)	Jr	Memphis, TN
F	13	Lorenzo Jenkins	6 ft 7 in (2.01 m)	215 lb (98 kg)	RS Sr	Naples, FL
F	15	Raef Gerdes	6 ft 7 in (2.01 m)	180 lb (82 kg)	So	Lee's Summit, MO
G	23	Carlos Johnson	6 ft 4 in (1.93 m)	220 lb (100 kg)	Sr	Centralia, IL
F	24	Bryce Okpoh	6 ft 7 in (2.01 m)	190 lb (86 kg)	Fr	The Colony, TX
C	25	Alessandro Lever	6 ft 10 in (2.08 m)	225 lb (102 kg)	Jr	Bolzano, Italy
F	30	Gabe McGlothan	6 ft 8 in (2.03 m)	220 lb (100 kg)	So	Gilbert, AZ
F	31	Ethan Spry	6 ft 6 in (1.98 m)	200 lb (91 kg)	Fr	Scottsdale, AZ

Head coach

- Dan Majerle (Central Michigan)

Assistant coach(es)

- Marvin Menzies (UCLA)
- Chris Crevelone (Adams State)
- Isaac Chew (Avila)

Legend

- (C) Team captain
- (S) Suspended
- (I) Ineligible
- (W) Walk-on
- Injured
- Current redshirt

Roster
Last update: October 17, 2024

== Schedule and results ==
Date time, TV	Rank^{#}	Opponent^{#}	Result	Record	Site (attendance) city, state
Exhibition
October 30, 2019*; 7:00 p.m., KUTP		Cal State San Bernardino	W 87–60		GCU Arena (7,190); Phoenix, AZ
Non-conference regular season
November 5, 2019*; 7:00 p.m., ESPN3/KUTP		Davenport	L 73–82	0–1	GCU Arena (7,014); Phoenix, AZ
November 8, 2019*; 7:00 p.m., ESPN3/KUTP		Illinois	L 71–83	0–2	GCU Arena (7,498); Phoenix, AZ
November 13, 2019*; 8:00 p.m., Stadium		at San Diego State	L 61–86	0–3	Viejas Arena (10,440); San Diego, CA
November 16, 2019*; 6:00 p.m., KUTP		Arkansas–Pine Bluff	W 67–54	1–3	GCU Arena (7,150); Phoenix, AZ
November 19, 2019*; 7:00 p.m., KUTP		Montana State	W 69–56	2–3	GCU Arena (6,862); Phoenix, AZ
November 22, 2019*; 11:00 a.m., FloHoops		vs. Valparaiso; U.S. Virgin Islands Paradise Jam quarterfinals	L 74–78	2–4	Sports and Fitness Center; Saint Thomas, USVI
November 24, 2019*; 1:00 p.m., FloHoops		vs. Fordham; U.S. Virgin Islands Paradise Jam consolation 2nd round	L 58–70	2–5	Sports and Fitness Center; St. Thomas, USVI
November 25, 2019*; 11:00 a.m., FloHoops		vs. Illinois State; U.S. Virgin Islands Paradise Jam 7th-place game	W 68–63	3–5	Sports and Fitness Center; St. Thomas, USVI
November 30, 2019*; 6:00 p.m., KUTP		Purdue Fort Wayne	L 60–71	3–6	GCU Arena (6,894); Phoenix, AZ
December 3, 2019*; 7:00 p.m., KUTP		Mount St. Mary's	W 75–67 ^{OT}	4–6	GCU Arena (6,785); Phoenix, AZ
December 8, 2019*; 4:30 p.m., ESPNU		Liberty	L 61–70	4–7	GCU Arena (5,406); Phoenix, AZ
December 12, 2019*; 7:00 p.m., KUTP		Northern Iowa	L 58–82	4–8	GCU Arena (7,186); Phoenix, AZ
December 17, 2019*; 7:00 p.m.		at New Mexico	L 71–91	4–9	Dreamstyle Arena (10,925); Albuquerque, NM
December 21, 2019*; 6:00 p.m., KUTP		Eastern Illinois	W 85–63	5–9	GCU Arena (6,634); Phoenix, AZ
WAC regular season
January 4, 2020; 8:00 p.m., ESPN3		at Cal State Bakersfield	L 62–69	5–10 (0–1)	Icardo Center (2,513); Bakersfield, CA
January 11, 2020; 6:00 p.m., KUTP		California Baptist	L 57–61	5–11 (0–2)	GCU Arena (7,054); Phoenix, AZ
January 16, 2020; 6:00 p.m.		at Chicago State	W 78–64	6–11 (1–2)	Jones Convocation Center (444); Chicago, IL
January 18, 2020; 6:00 p.m.		at Kansas City	W 69–66	7–11 (2–2)	Swinney Recreation Center (1,103); Kansas City, MO
January 23, 2020; 7:00 p.m., KUTP		Seattle	W 80–77	8–11 (3–2)	GCU Arena (6,572); Phoenix, AZ
January 25, 2020; 6:00 p.m., KUTP		Utah Valley	L 69–73	8–12 (3–3)	GCU Arena (7,034); Phoenix, AZ
January 30, 2020; 6:00 p.m., ESPN+		at Texas–Rio Grande Valley	W 87–79	9–12 (4–3)	UTRGV Fieldhouse (1,165); Edinburg, TX
February 1, 2020; 6:00 p.m.		at New Mexico State	L 52–72	9–13 (4–4)	Pan American Center (13,960); Las Cruces, NM
February 8, 2020; 8:00 p.m., ESPN+		at California Baptist	W 103–98	10–13 (5–4)	CBU Events Center (5,050); Riverside, CA
February 13, 2020; 7:00 p.m., KUTP		Kansas City	W 71–66 ^{OT}	11–13 (6–4)	GCU Arena (6,717); Phoenix, AZ
February 15, 2020; 6:00 p.m., KUTP		Chicago State	W 71–47	12–13 (7–4)	GCU Arena (6,888); Phoenix, AZ
February 20, 2020; 8:00 p.m., ESPN3		at Seattle	L 89–95	12–14 (7–5)	Redhawk Center; Seattle, WA
February 22, 2020; 2:00 p.m.		at Utah Valley	L 80–92	12–15 (7–6)	UCCU Center (5,236); Orem, UT
February 27, 2020; 7:00 p.m., KUTP		New Mexico State	L 53–67	12–16 (7–7)	GCU Arena (7,155); Phoenix, AZ
February 29, 2020; 6:00 p.m., KUTP		Texas–Rio Grande Valley	L 80–88	12–17 (7–8)	GCU Arena (7,002); Phoenix, AZ
March 7, 2020; 6:00 p.m., KUTP		Cal State Bakersfield	W 64–61	13–17 (8–8)	GCU Arena (7,142); Phoenix, AZ
WAC tournament
Canceled
*Non-conference game. ^{#}Rankings from AP poll. (#) Tournament seedings in parentheses. All times are in Mountain.
