= 2019–20 Cal State Bakersfield Roadrunners men's basketball team =

American college basketball season

2019–20 Cal State Bakersfield Roadrunners men's basketball
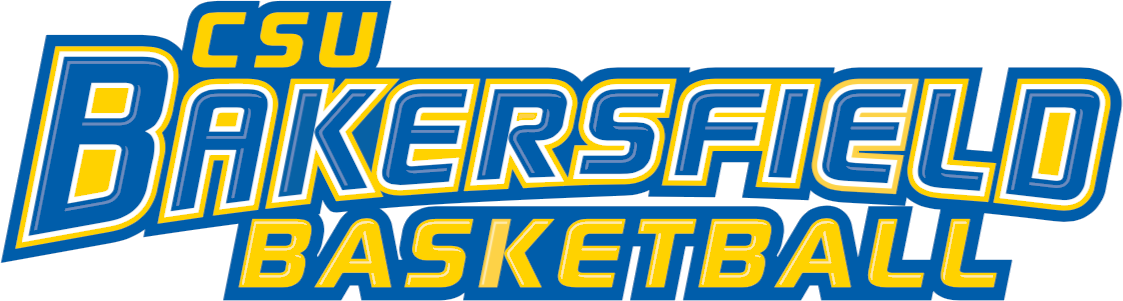
- Conference: Western Athletic Conference
- Record: 12–19 (6–10 WAC)
- Head coach: Rod Barnes (9th season)
- Assistant coaches: Jeff Conarroe; Mike Scott
- Home arena: Icardo Center (Capacity: 3,497)

2019–20 WAC men's basketball standings
	Conf.				Overall
Team	W		L	PCT	W		L	PCT
New Mexico State	16	–	0	1.000	25	–	6	.806
California Baptist *	10	–	6	.625	21	–	10	.677
Texas–Rio Grande Valley	9	–	7	.563	14	–	16	.467
Kansas City	8	–	7	.533	16	–	14	.533
Seattle	7	–	7	.500	14	–	15	.483
Grand Canyon	8	–	8	.500	13	–	17	.433
Cal State Bakersfield	6	–	10	.375	12	–	19	.387
Utah Valley	5	–	10	.333	11	–	19	.367
Chicago State	0	–	14	.000	4	–	25	.138
* Ineligible for the 2020 NCAA tournament due to transition period. NOTE: The 2020 WAC tournament was canceled due to the COVID-19 pandemic.

The 2019–20 Cal State Bakersfield Roadrunners men's basketball team represented California State University, Bakersfield in the 2019–20 NCAA Division I men's basketball season. The Roadrunners were led by ninth-year head coach Rod Barnes and played their home games at the Icardo Center as member of the Western Athletic Conference. They finished the season 12–19, 6–10 in WAC play to finish in seventh place. They were set to be the No. 7 seed in the WAC tournament, however, the tournament was cancelled amid the COVID-19 pandemic.

The season marked the final year in the WAC for the Roadrunners, as they will join the Big West Conference on July 1, 2020.

== Before the season ==
The Roadrunners finished the 2018–19 season 18–16 overall, and 7–9 in WAC play to finish in a tie for fifth place. They lost in the quarterfinals of the WAC tournament to Texas–Rio Grande Valley. They were invited to the CollegeInsider.com Tournament where they defeated Cal State Fullerton in the first round to win the Riley Wallace Classic and defeated Southern Utah in the second round. In the quarterfinals of the CIT, they lost to Green Bay.

== Roster ==
2019–20 Cal State Bakersfield Roadrunners men's basketball team
Players
Coaches

Pos.	#	Name	Height	Weight	Year	Hometown
C	0	Ronne Readus	6 ft 9 in (2.06 m)	240 lb (109 kg)	Jr	San Diego, CA
G	3	Cam Allen	6 ft 0 in (1.83 m)	180 lb (82 kg)	RS Jr	Greenville, SC
F	4	Tazé Moore	6 ft 5 in (1.96 m)	180 lb (82 kg)	RS Jr	Southaven, MS
G	5	Czar Perry	6 ft 2 in (1.88 m)	190 lb (86 kg)	Jr	El Dorado, AR
G/F	10	Justin Edler-Davis	6 ft 4 in (1.93 m)	215 lb (98 kg)	RS Jr	San Diego, CA
F	11	Jack Schoemann	6 ft 7 in (2.01 m)	200 lb (91 kg)	So	Prairie Village, KS
G	13	De'Monte Buckingham	6 ft 4 in (1.93 m)	220 lb (100 kg)	RS Jr	Richmond, VA
F	21	Greg Lee	6 ft 9 in (2.06 m)	210 lb (95 kg)	RS Jr	Rockford, IL
G/F	22	Justin McCall	6 ft 6 in (1.98 m)	210 lb (95 kg)	Jr	Bakersfield, CA
C	24	Ray Somerville	6 ft 10 in (2.08 m)	230 lb (104 kg)	Fr	Media, PA
F	25	Darrin Person Jr.	6 ft 7 in (2.01 m)	225 lb (102 kg)	RS So	Fresno, CA
F	32	Shawn Stith	6 ft 8 in (2.03 m)	265 lb (120 kg)	Jr	East Oakland, CA

Head coach

- Rod Barnes (Ole Miss)

Assistant coach(es)

- Jeff Conarroe (Colorado College)
- Mike Scott (Fairleigh Dickinson)

Legend

- (C) Team captain
- (S) Suspended
- (I) Ineligible
- (W) Walk-on
- Injured
- Current redshirt

Roster

== Schedule ==
Date time, TV	Rank^{#}	Opponent^{#}	Result	Record	High points	High rebounds	High assists	Site (attendance) city, state
Exhibition
November 2, 2019*; 7:00 pm		Westcliff	W 90–49		20 – Moore	7 – Readus	5 – Tied	Icardo Center (1,649); Bakersfield, CA
Non-conference regular season
November 5, 2019*; 7:30 pm, ESPN+		Notre Dame de Namur	W 103–51	1–0	18 – Moore, Stith	8 – Lee	8 – Buckingham	Icardo Center (2,007); Bakersfield, CA
November 9, 2019*; 7:00 pm, ESPN+		South Dakota State; Summit League/WAC Challenge	L 91–93 ^{2OT}	1–1	26 – Stith	9 – Edler-Davis	3 – Buckingham	Icardo Center (1,918); Bakersfield, CA
November 13, 2019*; 5:00 pm, ESPN+		at Northern Iowa	L 55–67	1–2	16 – Allen	5 – Tied	5 – Allen	McLeod Center (3,151); Cedar Falls, IA
November 15, 2019*; 11:00 am, ESPN+		Life Pacific	W 91–51	2–2	19 – Buckingham	8 – Readus	6 – Perry	Icardo Center; Bakersfield, CA
November 19, 2019*; 7:00 pm		at San Francisco	L 70–100	2–3	15 – Allen	6 – Moore	2 – Perry	The Sobrato Center (1,503); San Francisco, CA
November 23, 2019*; 5:00 pm		at No. 8 Gonzaga	L 49–77	2–4	11 – Edler-Davis	7 – Buckingham	3 – Perry	McCarthey Athletic Center (6,000); Spokane, WA
November 26, 2019*; 7:30 pm, ESPN+		Sam Houston State	L 65–74	2–5	19 – Bowie	5 – Bryant	4 – Bowie	Icardo Center (2,207); Bakersfield, CA
November 29, 2019*; 7:00 pm, ESPN+		Hampton	W 70–57	3–5	16 – Moore	10 – Moore	4 – Moore	Icardo Center (1,668); Bakersfield, CA
November 30, 2019*; 7:00 pm, ESPN+		San Diego Christian	W 87–59	4–5	16 – Buckingham	8 – Readus	6 – Perry	Icardo Center (1,545); Bakersfield, CA
December 3, 2019*; 7:00 pm, ESPN3		UC Santa Barbara	L 60-64	4-6	23 – Perry	5 – Tied	3 – Moore	Icardo Center (2,808); Bakersfield, CA
December 7, 2019*; 11:00 am, SECN+		at Ole Miss	L 67–83	4–7	17 – Moore	5 – Tied	8 – Perry	The Pavilion at Ole Miss; Oxford, MS
December 14, 2019*; 4:00 pm, Pluto TV		at Idaho	L 70–76 ^{OT}	4–8	16 – Buckingham	16 – Readus	7 – Perry	Cowan Spectrum (956); Moscow, ID
December 19, 2019*; 7:00 pm, ESPN3		Montana State	W 74–72	5–8	15 – Allen	5 – Tied	7 – Perry	Icardo Center (1,877); Bakersfield, CA
December 21, 2019*; 7:00 pm		at Cal Poly	W 72–50	6–8	13 – Moore	8 – Buckingham	5 – Moore	Robert A. Mott Athletics Center (1,545); San Luis Obispo, CA
December 29, 2019*; 1:00 pm, FSSW		at No. 23 Texas Tech	L 58–73	6–9	10 – Edler-Davis	6 – Tied	7 – Perry	United Supermarkets Arena (14,055); Lubbock, TX
WAC Regular Season
January 4, 2020; 7:00 pm, ESPN+		Grand Canyon	W 69–62	7–9 (1–0)	25 – Buckingham	13 – Lee	6 – Perry	Icardo Center (2,513); Bakersfield, CA
January 8, 2020; 7:00 pm, ESPN3		California Baptist	L 75–83	7–10 (1–1)	23 – Tied	7 – Moore	7 – Perry	Icardo Center (1,988); Bakersfield, CA
January 16, 2020; 5:00 pm		at Kansas City	W 74–64 ^{OT}	8–10 (2–1)	25 – Elder-Davis	12 – McCall	6 – Perry	Municipal Auditorium (1,216); Kansas City, MO
January 18, 2020; 10:00 am		at Chicago State	W 72–54	9–10 (3–1)	19 – Lee	6 – 3 tied	4 – Buckingham	Jones Convocation Center (255); Chicago, IL
January 23, 2020; 7:00 pm, ESPN3		Utah Valley	W 58–57 ^{OT}	10–10 (4–1)	15 – Moore	11 – Lee	4 – Perry	Icardo Center (2,071); Bakersfield, CA
January 25, 2020; 7:00 pm, ESPN3		Seattle	L 79–86	10–11 (4–2)	23 – Moore	7 – Moore	8 – Perry	Icardo Center (3,515); Bakersfield, CA
January 30, 2020; 6:00 pm		at New Mexico State	L 57–61	10–12 (5–2)	11 – Tied	6 – Person Jr.	5 – Perry	Pan American Center (5,126); Las Cruces, NM
February 1, 2020; 5:00 pm		at Texas–Rio Grande Valley	L 59–70	10–13 (5–3)	18 – Lee	6 – Tied	4 – Allen	UTRGV Fieldhouse (1,065); Edinburg, TX
February 6, 2020; 7:00 pm		at California Baptist	L 69–74	10–14 (4–5)	22 – Allen	7 – Buckingham	3 – 3 tied	CBU Events Center (3,325); Riverside, CA
February 13, 2020; 7:00 pm, ESPN+		Chicago State	W 64–54	11–14 (5–5)	16 – Lee	8 – Moore	7 – Buckingham	Icardo Center (1,709); Bakersfield, CA
February 15, 2020; 7:00 pm, ESPN3		Kansas City	L 53–59	11–15 (5–6)	13 – Lee	8 – Buckingham	4 – Moore	Icardo Center (1,909); Bakersfield, CA
February 6, 2020; 6:00 pm		at Utah Valley	L 58–72	11–16 (5–7)	25 – Allen	6 – Stith	2 – Perry	UCCU Center (2,029); Orem, UT
February 22, 2020; 7:00 pm		at Seattle	L 54–69	11–17 (5–8)	12 – Perry	7 – Lee	1 – 6 tied	Redhawk Center (999); Seattle, WA
February 27, 2020; 7:00 pm, ESPN3		Texas–Rio Grande Valley	W 79–59	12–17 (6–8)	21 – Stith	5 – Tied	3 – Tied	Icardo Center (2,134); Bakersfield, CA
February 29, 2020; 7:00 pm, ESPN3		New Mexico State	L 46–62	12–18 (6–9)	18 – Moore	8 – Edler-Davis	5 – Perry	Icardo Center (2,947); Bakersfield, CA
March 7, 2020; 5:00 pm, ESPN3		at Grand Canyon	L 61–64	12–19 (6–10)	15 – Moore	8 – Readus	6 – Perry	GCU Arena (7,142); Phoenix, AZ
WAC tournament
Mar 12, 2020; 6:00 pm, ESPN+	(7)	vs. (2) Texas–Rio Grande Valley; Quarterfinals	Cancelled due to the COVID-19 pandemic					Orleans Arena; Paradise, NV
*Non-conference game. ^{#}Rankings from AP Poll. (#) Tournament seedings in parentheses. All times are in Pacific.

Schedule source:
