= 2019–20 California Baptist Lancers men's basketball team =

American college basketball season

2019–20 California Baptist Lancers men's basketball
- Conference: Western Athletic Conference
- Record: 21–10 (10–6 WAC)
- Head coach: Rick Croy (7th season)
- Associate head coach: Hardy Asprilla
- Assistant coaches: Adam Jacobsen; Geoffrey McIntosh
- Home arena: CBU Events Center

2019–20 WAC men's basketball standings
	Conf.				Overall
Team	W		L	PCT	W		L	PCT
New Mexico State	16	–	0	1.000	25	–	6	.806
California Baptist *	10	–	6	.625	21	–	10	.677
Texas–Rio Grande Valley	9	–	7	.563	14	–	16	.467
Kansas City	8	–	7	.533	16	–	14	.533
Seattle	7	–	7	.500	14	–	15	.483
Grand Canyon	8	–	8	.500	13	–	17	.433
Cal State Bakersfield	6	–	10	.375	12	–	19	.387
Utah Valley	5	–	10	.333	11	–	19	.367
Chicago State	0	–	14	.000	4	–	25	.138
* Ineligible for the 2020 NCAA tournament due to transition period. NOTE: The 2020 WAC tournament was canceled due to the COVID-19 pandemic.

The 2019–20 California Baptist Lancers men's basketball team represented California Baptist University (CBU) in the 2019–20 NCAA Division I men's basketball season. The Lancers, led by seventh-year head coach Rick Croy, played their home games at the CBU Events Center in Riverside, California as members of the Western Athletic Conference (WAC). They finished the season 21–10, 10–6 in WAC play, to finish in second place.

The season marked CBU's second year of a four-year transition period from Division II to Division I. As a result, the Lancers were not eligible for NCAA postseason play and could not participate in the WAC tournament. They were eligible to play in the CIT or CBI, if invited. However, all postseason play was cancelled due to they COVID-19 pandemic.

== Previous season ==
The Lancers finished the 2018–19 season 16–15, 7–9 in WAC play, to finish in a tie for fifth place. They were ineligible to participate in the WAC tournament due to their transition from Division II to Division I. They received an invite to the CBI, where they lost to Loyola Marymount in the first round.

== Roster ==
2019–20 California Baptist Lancers men's basketball team
Players
Coaches

Pos.	#	Name	Height	Weight	Year	Hometown
G	0	Milan Acquaah	6 ft 3 in (1.91 m)	195 lb (88 kg)	Jr	Bakersfield, CA
G	3	Tre Armstrong	6 ft 5 in (1.96 m)	200 lb (91 kg)	Fr	Burnie, Australia
F	4	Omar Lo	6 ft 9 in (2.06 m)	210 lb (95 kg)	RS Sr	Los Angeles, CA
G	5	Reed Nottage	6 ft 6 in (1.98 m)	200 lb (91 kg)	Fr	Sydney, Australia
G	10	Jordan Caruso	6 ft 3 in (1.91 m)	180 lb (82 kg)	So	New York City, NY
F	11	Bul Kuol	6 ft 7 in (2.01 m)	215 lb (98 kg)	RS Jr	Canberra, Australia
C	12	Glenn Morison	6 ft 10 in (2.08 m)	240 lb (109 kg)	So	Canberra, Australia
G	15	Brandon Boyd	6 ft 1 in (1.85 m)	180 lb (82 kg)	RS Sr	Los Angeles, CA
G	23	Jordan Gonzalez	6 ft 2 in (1.88 m)	190 lb (86 kg)	RS So	Pasadena, CA
G	25	Ty Rowell	6 ft 2 in (1.88 m)	185 lb (84 kg)	Jr	Langley, BC
G	31	Ferron Jr. Flavors	6 ft 3 in (1.91 m)	190 lb (86 kg)	RS Jr	Federal Way, WA
G	32	Micah Robinson	6 ft 4 in (1.93 m)	180 lb (82 kg)	RS Sr	Rancho Cucamonga, CA
C	33	Zach Pirog	6 ft 11 in (2.11 m)	245 lb (111 kg)	RS Sr	Highlands Ranch, CO
F	34	Tristan Forsyth	6 ft 10 in (2.08 m)	235 lb (107 kg)	Jr	Melbourne, Australia
F	35	De'jon Davis	6 ft 7 in (2.01 m)	225 lb (102 kg)	Sr	Oakland, CA

Head coach

- Rick Croy (Azusa Pacific)

Assistant coach(es)

- Hardy Asprilla (Cal State Fullerton)
- Adam Jacobsen (Pacific)
- Geoffrey McIntosh (Cal State Monterey Bay)

Legend

- (C) Team captain
- (S) Suspended
- (I) Ineligible
- (W) Walk-on
- Injured
- Current redshirt

Roster
Last update: September 29, 2025

== Schedule and results ==
Date time, TV	Opponent	Result	Record	Site (attendance) city, state
Regular season
November 5, 2019*; 7:00 p.m., WAC DN	Jackson State	W 93–70	1–0	CBU Events Center (4,976); Riverside, CA
November 8, 2019*; 7:00 p.m., WAC DN	Cal Lutheran	W 112–56	2–0	CBU Events Center (5,050); Riverside, CA
November 12, 2019*; 5:00 p.m., LHN	at Texas	L 54–67	2–1	Frank Erwin Center (8,157); Austin, TX
November 15, 2019*; 7:00 p.m., P12N	at California	L 62–82	2–2	Haas Pavilion (4,115); Berkeley, CA
November 22, 2019*; 7:00 p.m., FloHoops	Central Arkansas; 2K Empire Classic	W 104–98 ^{OT}	3–2	CBU Events Center (2,628); Riverside, CA
November 23, 2019*; 7:00 p.m., FloHoops	Georgia State; 2K Empire Classic	L 60–69	3–3	CBU Events Center (1,946); Riverside, CA
November 27, 2019*; 7:00 p.m., WAC DN	South Dakota; Summit League/WAC Challenge	L 83–84	3–4	CBU Events Center (1,760); Riverside, CA
December 4, 2019*; 7:00 p.m., ESPN+/RiversideTV	UC Riverside	W 79–67	4–4	CBU Events Center (4,067); Riverside, CA
December 7, 2019*; 7:00 p.m.	at UC Irvine	W 68–60	5–4	Bren Events Center (1,938); Irvine, CA
December 14, 2019*; 7:00 p.m., WAC DN	Bethune–Cookman	W 87–68	6–4	CBU Events Center; Riverside, CA
December 18, 2019*; 7:00 p.m., WAC DN	Southern	W 78–61	7–4	CBU Events Center (1,874); Riverside, CA
December 22, 2019*; 7:00 p.m., WAC DN	Mississippi Valley State	W 103–66	8–4	CBU Events Center (2,003); Riverside, CA
December 28, 2019*; 7:00 p.m., WAC DN	Ottawa (AZ)	W 92–75	9–4	CBU Events Center (1,833); Riverside, CA
January 2, 2020; 7:00 p.m., WAC DN	Texas–Rio Grande Valley	W 76–67	10–4 (1–0)	CBU Events Center (2,493); Riverside, CA
January 4, 2020; 7:00 p.m., ESPN+	New Mexico State	L 71–86	10–5 (1–1)	CBU Events Center (4,754); Riverside, CA
January 8, 2020; 7:00 p.m., ESPN+	at Cal State Bakersfield	W 83–75	11–5 (2–1)	Icardo Center (1,988); Bakersfield, CA
January 11, 2020; 6:00 p.m., ESPN3	at Grand Canyon	W 61–57	12–5 (3–1)	GCU Arena (7,054); Phoenix, AZ
January 17, 2020*; 7:00 p.m., WAC DN	Bethesda	W 96–62	13–5	CBU Events Center (3,039); Riverside, CA
January 22, 2020; 7:00 p.m., WAC DN	Chicago State	W 85–53	14–5 (4–1)	CBU Events Center (3,461); Riverside, CA
January 25, 2020; 7:00 p.m., ESPN+	Kansas City	L 57–67	14–6 (4–2)	CBU Events Center (4,047); Riverside, CA
January 29, 2020; 6:00 p.m., WAC DN	at Utah Valley	W 65–61	15–6 (5–2)	UCCU Center (3,367); Orem, UT
February 1, 2020; 1:00 p.m., WAC DN	at Seattle	W 72–65	16–6 (6–2)	Redhawk Center (880); Seattle, WA
February 6, 2020; 7:00 p.m., WAC DN	Cal State Bakersfield	W 74–69	17–6 (7–2)	CBU Events Center (3,325); Riverside, CA
February 8, 2020; 7:00 p.m., ESPN+	Grand Canyon	L 98–103	17–7 (7–3)	CBU Events Center (5,050); Riverside, CA
February 13, 2020*; 7:00 p.m., WAC DN	Westcliff	W 107–45	18–7	CBU Events Center (1,610); Riverside, CA
February 19, 2020; 5:00 p.m., WAC DN	at Kansas City	L 63–69	18–8 (7–4)	Swinney Recreation Center (1,211); Kansas City, MO
February 22, 2020; 10:00 a.m., WAC DN	at Chicago State	W 95–53	19–8 (8–4)	Jones Convocation Center (368); Chicago, IL
February 26, 2020; 7:00 p.m., ESPN+	Utah Valley	W 73–66	20–8 (9–4)	CBU Events Center (2,834); Riverside, CA
February 29, 2020; 7:00 p.m., ESPN+/RiversideTV	Seattle	W 88–87 ^{OT}	21–8 (10–4)	CBU Events Center (5,058); Riverside, CA
March 5, 2020; 6:00 p.m., WAC DN	at New Mexico State	L 50–83	21–9 (10–5)	Pan American Center (7,015); Las Cruces, NM
March 7, 2020; 5:00 p.m., WAC DN	at Texas–Rio Grande Valley	L 76–79	21–10 (10–6)	UTRGV Fieldhouse (1,523); Edinburg, TX
*Non-conference game. ^{#}Rankings from AP poll. (#) Tournament seedings in parentheses. All times are in Pacific.
