= 2019–20 Seattle Redhawks men's basketball team =

American college basketball season

2019–20 Seattle Redhawks men's basketball
- Conference: Western Athletic Conference
- Record: 14–15 (7–7 WAC)
- Head coach: Jim Hayford (3rd season)
- Assistant coaches: Chris Victor; Alex Pribble; Sam Kirby
- Home arena: Redhawk Center; ShoWare Center

2019–20 WAC men's basketball standings
	Conf.				Overall
Team	W		L	PCT	W		L	PCT
New Mexico State	16	–	0	1.000	25	–	6	.806
California Baptist *	10	–	6	.625	21	–	10	.677
Texas–Rio Grande Valley	9	–	7	.563	14	–	16	.467
Kansas City	8	–	7	.533	16	–	14	.533
Seattle	7	–	7	.500	14	–	15	.483
Grand Canyon	8	–	8	.500	13	–	17	.433
Cal State Bakersfield	6	–	10	.375	12	–	19	.387
Utah Valley	5	–	10	.333	11	–	19	.367
Chicago State	0	–	14	.000	4	–	25	.138
* Ineligible for the 2020 NCAA tournament due to transition period. NOTE: The 2020 WAC tournament was canceled due to the COVID-19 pandemic.

The 2019–20 Seattle Redhawks men's basketball team represented Seattle University during the 2019–20 NCAA Division I men's basketball season. The Redhawks, led by third-year head coach Jim Hayford, played their home games at the Redhawk Center, with three home games at the ShoWare Center, as members of the Western Athletic Conference (WAC). They finished the season 14–15, 7–7 in WAC play, to finish in a tie for fifth place. Due to irregularities in conference standings due to cancelled games, they were set to be the No. 3 seed in the WAC tournament; however, the tournament was cancelled amid the COVID-19 pandemic.

== Previous season ==
They finished the season 18–15, 6–10 in WAC play, to finish in a tie for seventh place. In the postseason, they were defeated by Grand Canyon in the 2019 WAC tournament. They received an invitation to the CIT where they lost in the first round to Presbyterian.

== Roster ==
2019–20 Seattle Redhawks men's basketball team
Players
Coaches

Pos.	#	Name	Height	Weight	Year	Hometown
G	0	Rip Economou	6 ft 8 in (2.03 m)	190 lb (86 kg)	So	Santa Monica, CA
F	1	Myles Carter	6 ft 9 in (2.06 m)	230 lb (104 kg)	RS Sr	Chicago, IL
G	2	Trey Hopkins	6 ft 3 in (1.91 m)	180 lb (82 kg)	So	Midwest City, OK
F	5	Joe Wall	6 ft 7 in (2.01 m)	215 lb (98 kg)	So	Portland, OR
G	10	Aaron Nettles	6 ft 0 in (1.83 m)	175 lb (79 kg)	Jr	Seattle, WA
G/F	11	Riley Grigsby	6 ft 6 in (1.98 m)	220 lb (100 kg)	So	San Jose, CA
G	12	Mattia Da Campo	6 ft 7 in (2.01 m)	210 lb (95 kg)	Sr	Venice, Italy
G	13	Morgan Means	6 ft 3 in (1.91 m)	175 lb (79 kg)	Sr	Compton, CA
F	14	Matt Vail	6 ft 5 in (1.96 m)	190 lb (86 kg)	So	Stanwood, WA
C	21	Jordan Dallas	6 ft 10 in (2.08 m)	220 lb (100 kg)	Sr	Long Beach, CA
G	23	Terrell Brown Jr.	6 ft 1 in (1.85 m)	175 lb (79 kg)	RS Jr	Seattle, WA
G	24	Delante Jones	6 ft 5 in (1.96 m)	195 lb (88 kg)	RS Sr	Chantilly, VA
F	25	Cade Alger	6 ft 9 in (2.06 m)	190 lb (86 kg)	Fr	Ripon, CA
G	30	Tiago Zibecchi	6 ft 6 in (1.98 m)	200 lb (91 kg)	RS So	Rio de Janeiro, Brazil
G	33	Mikkel Hauge	6 ft 4 in (1.93 m)	200 lb (91 kg)	Fr	Copenhagen, Denmark
F	34	Anand Hundal	6 ft 10 in (2.08 m)	230 lb (104 kg)	Sr	Manteca, CA
F	35	Dovy Pinskus	6 ft 7 in (2.01 m)	195 lb (88 kg)	Fr	Vilnius, Lithuania
G	41	Jaren Nafarrete	5 ft 7 in (1.7 m)	140 lb (64 kg)	Fr	San Diego, CA

Head coach

- Jim Hayford (Azusa Pacific)

Assistant coach(es)

- Chris Victor (Concordia–Irvine)
- Alex Pribble (California)
- Sam Kirby (Seattle)

Legend

- (C) Team captain
- (S) Suspended
- (I) Ineligible
- (W) Walk-on
- Injured
- Current redshirt

Roster
Last update: September 26, 2019

== Schedule and results ==
Date time, TV	Rank^{#}	Opponent^{#}	Result	Record	Site (attendance) city, state
Exhibition
October 22, 2019*; 7:00 p.m.		Saint Martin's	W 92–71		Redhawk Center (663); Seattle, WA
Non-conference regular season
November 5, 2019*; 7:00 p.m., WAC DN		Pacific Lutheran	W 98–64	1–0	Redhawk Center (828); Seattle, WA
November 7, 2019*; 6:00 p.m., P12N		at Washington State	L 54–85	1–1	Beasley Coliseum (2,810); Pullman, WA
November 9, 2019*; 7:00 p.m., RTNW		Eastern Washington	L 66–74	1–2	Redhawk Center (999); Seattle, WA
November 12, 2019*; 7:00 p.m., WAC DN		Pacific University	W 115–81	2–2	Redhawk Center (921); Seattle, WA
November 16, 2019*; 4:00 p.m., ACCNX		at Syracuse; NIT Season Tip-Off campus-site game	L 67–89	2–3	Carrier Dome (21,487); Syracuse, NY
November 19, 2019*; 4:30 p.m., SECN+		at Ole Miss; NIT Season Tip-Off campus-site game	L 52–65	2–4	The Pavilion at Ole Miss (6,316); Oxford, MS
November 25, 2019*; 11:00 a.m., ESPNU		vs. Bucknell; NIT Season Tip-Off Orlando Subregional	L 70–77	2–5	HP Field House (250); Orlando, FL
November 26, 2019*; 9:00 a.m., ESPNU		vs. Western Michigan; NIT Season Tip-Off Orlando Subregional	W 59–55	3–5	HP Field House (250); Orlando, FL
November 30, 2019*; 7:00 p.m., WAC DN		Idaho	W 74–55	4–5	Redhawk Center (863); Seattle, WA
December 3, 2019*; 7:00 p.m., WAC DN		Incarnate Word	W 81–60	5–5	Redhawk Center (820); Seattle, WA
December 7, 2019*; 7:00 p.m., WAC DN		Portland; Elgin Baylor Classic	W 73–71	6–5	ShoWare Center (753); Kent, WA
December 17, 2019*; 8:00 p.m., P12N		at No. 22 Washington	L 59–81	6–6	Alaska Airlines Arena (7,760); Seattle, WA
December 21, 2019*; 7:00 p.m., WAC DN		Florida A&M	L 57–71	6–7	Redhawk Center (806); Seattle, WA
December 23, 2019*; 3:00 p.m., WAC DN		Long Beach State	W 79–57	7–7	Redhawk Center (940); Seattle, WA
December 28, 2019*; 5:00 p.m.		at Saint Mary's	L 58–84	7–8	University Credit Union Pavilion (3,500); Moraga, CA
WAC regular season
January 2, 2020; 5:00 p.m., WAC DN		at Kansas City	L 86–90 ^{3OT}	7–9 (0–1)	Municipal Auditorium (1,158); Kansas City, MO
January 4, 2020; 10:00 a.m., WAC DN		at Chicago State	W 86–54	8–9 (1–1)	Jones Convocation Center (307); Chicago, IL
January 11, 2020; 7:00 p.m., WAC DN		Utah Valley	W 83–50	9–9 (2–1)	Redhawk Center (999); Seattle, WA
January 16, 2020; 7:00 p.m., WAC DN		Texas–Rio Grande Valley	W 91–74	10–9 (3–1)	Redhawk Center (862); Seattle, WA
January 18, 2020; 7:00 p.m., WAC DN		New Mexico State	L 67–75	10–10 (3–2)	Redhawk Center (999); Seattle, WA
January 23, 2020; 6:00 p.m., WAC DN		at Grand Canyon	L 77–80	10–11 (3–3)	GCU Arena (6,572); Phoenix, AZ
January 25, 2020; 7:00 p.m., WAC DN		at Cal State Bakersfield	W 86–79	11–11 (4–3)	Icardo Center (3,515); Bakersfield, CA
February 1, 2020; 1:00 p.m., WAC DN		California Baptist	L 65–72	11–12 (4–4)	ShoWare Center (880); Kent, WA
February 8, 2020; 1:00 p.m., WAC DN		at Utah Valley	W 87–85 ^{OT}	12–12 (5–4)	UCCU Center (2,975); Orem, UT
February 13, 2020; 6:00 p.m., WAC DN		at New Mexico State	L 64–72	12–13 (5–5)	Pan American Center (4,794); Las Cruces, NM
February 15, 2020; 5:00 p.m., WAC DN		at Texas–Rio Grande Valley	L 72–79	12–14 (5–6)	UTRGV Fieldhouse (1,667); Edinburg, TX
February 20, 2020; 7:00 p.m., ESPN+		Grand Canyon	W 95–89	13–14 (6–6)	Redhawk Center; Seattle, WA
February 22, 2020; 7:00 p.m., WAC DN		Cal State Bakersfield	W 69–54	14–14 (7–6)	Redhawk Center (999); Seattle, WA
February 29, 2020; 7:00 p.m., WAC DN		at California Baptist	L 87–88 ^{OT}	14–15 (7–7)	CBU Events Center (5,058); Riverside, CA
March 5, 2020; 7:00 p.m., WAC DN		Chicago State	Cancelled due to the COVID-19 pandemic		Redhawk Center; Seattle, WA
March 7, 2020; 1:00 p.m., WAC DN		Kansas City	Cancelled due to the COVID-19 pandemic		ShoWare Center; Kent, WA
WAC tournament
March 12, 2020; 8:30 p.m., ESPN+	(3)	vs. (6) Utah Valley; Quarterfinals	Cancelled due to the COVID-19 pandemic		Orleans Arena; Paradise, NV
*Non-conference game. ^{#}Rankings from AP poll. (#) Tournament seedings in parentheses. All times are in Pacific.

Schedule Source:
