= 2019–20 Kansas City Roos men's basketball team =

American college basketball season

2019–20 Kansas City Roos men's basketball
- Conference: Western Athletic Conference
- Record: 16–14 (8–7 WAC)
- Head coach: Billy Donlon (1st season)
- Assistant coaches: Lucas McKay (1st season); Steve Payne (1st season); Rodney Perry (1st season)
- Home arena: Swinney Recreation Center

2019–20 WAC men's basketball standings
	Conf.				Overall
Team	W		L	PCT	W		L	PCT
New Mexico State	16	–	0	1.000	25	–	6	.806
California Baptist *	10	–	6	.625	21	–	10	.677
Texas–Rio Grande Valley	9	–	7	.563	14	–	16	.467
Kansas City	8	–	7	.533	16	–	14	.533
Seattle	7	–	7	.500	14	–	15	.483
Grand Canyon	8	–	8	.500	13	–	17	.433
Cal State Bakersfield	6	–	10	.375	12	–	19	.387
Utah Valley	5	–	10	.333	11	–	19	.367
Chicago State	0	–	14	.000	4	–	25	.138
* Ineligible for the 2020 NCAA tournament due to transition period. NOTE: The 2020 WAC tournament was canceled due to the COVID-19 pandemic.

The 2019–20 Kansas City Roos men's basketball team represented the University of Missouri–Kansas City during the 2019–20 NCAA Division I men's basketball season. The Roos, led by first-year head coach Billy Donlon, played their home games on-campus at Swinney Recreation Center in Kansas City, Missouri as a member of the Western Athletic Conference (WAC).

The Roos finished the season 16–14, 8–7 in WAC play, to finish in fourth place. They were slated to be the fifth seed in the WAC tournament; however, the event was canceled as the initial breakout of the COVID-19 pandemic was commencing.

This would be the Roos' last season as a member of the WAC, as they would rejoin the Summit League in July 2020 after a seven-year absence.

On July 1, 2019, the University of Missouri–Kansas City (UMKC) announced that its athletic program, formerly known as the UMKC Kangaroos, would officially be referred to as the Kansas City Roos.

== Previous season ==
The Roos finished the 2018–19 season with a record of 11–21 overall, 6–10 in conference play, to finish in a tie for seventh place.

== Roster ==
2019–20 Kansas City Roos men's basketball team
Players
Coaches

Pos.	#	Name	Height	Weight	Year	Previous school	Hometown
F	5	Jordan Giles	6 ft 7 in (2.01 m)	225 lb (102 kg)	Sr	Tennessee Christian Preparatory/ Holy Spirit Catholic	Tuscaloosa, AL
G	4	Jahshire Hardnett	5 ft 11 in (1.8 m)	193 lb (88 kg)	Sr	BYU/ Chipola; Gulfport HS	Gulfport, MS
F	14	Arkel Lamar	6 ft 5 in (1.96 m)	235 lb (107 kg)	Sr	UMBC; St. Thomas More School/ St. Thomas Aquinas HS	Bridgeport, CT
F	25	Javan White	6 ft 10 in (2.08 m)	230 lb (104 kg)	Sr	Clemson/ Oral Roberts; Ames HS	Ames, IA
G	2	Rob Whitfield	6 ft 3 in (1.91 m)	175 lb (79 kg)	Sr	Hutchinson CC; Wake Christian Academy	Raleigh, NC
F	22	Brandon Suggs	6 ft 8 in (2.03 m)	220 lb (100 kg)	RS Jr	Bethune–Cookman; Winnebago HS	Rockford, IL
G	23	Steve Dulley (W)	6 ft 3 in (1.91 m)	200 lb (91 kg)	Jr	Lincoln College Preparatory	Kansas City, MO
G	3	Brandon McKissic	6 ft 3 in (1.91 m)	195 lb (88 kg)	Jr	St. Louis University HS	Ferguson, MO
G	33	Marvin Jr. Nesbitt	6 ft 4 in (1.93 m)	180 lb (82 kg)	Jr	Butler College Preparatory HS	Chicago, IL
G	0	Zion Williams	6 ft 4 in (1.93 m)	193 lb (88 kg)	Jr	Wallace State CC; Saint Mark's HS	Maybrook, NY
G	11	Franck Kamgain	6 ft 2 in (1.88 m)	195 lb (88 kg)	So	Wheeling Jesuit; DME Academy/ Center HS	Kansas City, MO
G		Demarius Pitts (redshirt)	6 ft 4 in (1.93 m)	180 lb (82 kg)	So	Virginia Union; Springfield Commonwealth Academy/ Frederick Douglass HS	Clinton, MD
G		FoFo Adetogun (redshirt)	6 ft 1 in (1.85 m)	189 lb (86 kg)	Fr	Edge School/ Athol Murray College of Notre Dame HS	Regina, SK
F	20	Josiah Allick	6 ft 7 in (2.01 m)	215 lb (98 kg)	Fr	Lincoln North Star HS	Lincoln, NE
G		Malik Cherry (W) (redshirt)	6 ft 0 in (1.83 m)	178 lb (81 kg)	Fr	St. Michael the Archangel Catholic HS	Kansas City, MO
G		Jacob Johnson (redshirt)	6 ft 5 in (1.96 m)	180 lb (82 kg)	Fr	Champlin Park HS	Brooklyn Park, MN
G	12	Maks Klanjscek	6 ft 5 in (1.96 m)	200 lb (91 kg)	Fr	Hoosac School	Ljubljana, Slovenia
G	21	Sam Martin (redshirt)	6 ft 0 in (1.83 m)	185 lb (84 kg)	Fr	Burleson HS	Houston, TX

Head coach

- Billy Donlon (UNC Wilmington)

Assistant coach(es)

- Lucas McKay (UNC Wilmington)
- Steve Payne (Union Commonwealth)
- Rodney Perry (Missouri State)

Legend

- (C) Team captain
- (S) Suspended
- (I) Ineligible
- (W) Walk-on
- (5Y) Fifth-year senior
- Injured
- Current redshirt

Roster
Last update: November 3, 2024

== Schedule & results ==
Date time, TV	Rank^{#}	Opponent^{#}	Result	Record	High points	High rebounds	High assists	Site (attendance) city, state
Regular season
November 5, 2019*; 7:30 p.m., Roo Sports Network		Avila	W 102–49	1–0	27 – McKissic	11 – Nesbitt Jr.	7 – Williams	Swinney Recreation Center (785); Kansas City, MO
November 9, 2019*; 2:00 p.m., ESPN+		at Oklahoma State	L 51–69	1–1	20 – White	5 – White	4 – Whitfield	Gallagher-Iba Arena (6,239); Stillwater, OK
November 13, 2019*; 7:00 p.m., ESPN+		at Drake	L 58–76	1–2	15 – Giles	6 – Giles	3 – Giles, Hardnett	Knapp Center (2,415); Des Moines, IA
November 15, 2019*; 7:00 p.m., ESPN+		at Milwaukee	L 52–61	1–3	10 – Whitfield, McKissic	9 – White	4 – Giles	UWMilwaukee Panther Arena (1,590); Milwaukee, WI
November 18, 2019*; 7:00 p.m., Roo Sports Network		Bacone	W 111–38	2–3	24 – White	15 – White	10 – Hardnett	Swinney Recreation Center (478); Kansas City, MO
November 22, 2019*; 4:00 p.m., FloHoops		vs. George Washington; Islands of the Bahamas Showcase quarterfinal	W 74–68	3–3	25 – Hardnett	7 – Nesbitt Jr.	5 – McKissic	Baha Mar Convention Center (300); Nassau, Bahamas
November 23, 2019*; 8:00 p.m., FloHoops		vs. East Carolina; Islands of the Bahamas Showcase semifinal	W 74–68	4–3	29 – Whitfield	11 – White	6 – McKissic	Baha Mar Convention Center (300); Nassau, Bahamas
November 24, 2019*; 8:00 p.m., FloHoops		vs. Liberty; Islands of the Bahamas Showcase final	L 49–62	4–4	13 – Giles	8 – Giles	3 – Giles	Baha Mar Convention Center (300); Nassau, Bahamas
November 30, 2019*; 7:00 p.m., Roo Sports Network		Western Illinois	W 68–67	5–4	19 – Hardnett	13 – White	5 – White	Swinney Recreation Center (964); Kansas City, MO
December 4, 2019*; 7:00 p.m., Cyclones.tv		at Iowa State	L 61–79	5–5	11 – Nesbitt Jr.	5 – White, Nesbitt Jr.	2 – Hardnett, White, McKissic	James H. Hilton Coliseum (13,718); Ames, IA
December 10, 2019*; 6:30 p.m., Cowboy Insider		at McNeese	L 73–82	5–6	16 – Hardnett	5 – White, Suggs	2 – Williams, Kamgain	Health and Human Performance Education Complex (2,449); Lake Charles, LA
December 14, 2019*; 4:00 p.m., ESPN+		vs. No. 2 Kansas	L 57–98	5–7	12 – White, Nesbitt Jr.	8 – White	8 – McKissic	Sprint Center (17,702); Kansas City, MO
December 17, 2019*; 7:00 p.m., Roo Sports Network		Toledo	W 72–57	6–7	18 – McKissic	11 – White	6 – McKissic	Swinney Recreation Center (773); Kansas City, MO
December 22, 2019*; 3:30 p.m., Goyotes Live		at South Dakota	W 78–75	7–7	25 – Giles	5 – Giles	4 – White	Sanford Coyote Sports Center (1,483); Vermillion, SD
January 2, 2020; 7:00 p.m., Roo Sports Network		Seattle	W 90–86 ^{3OT}	8–7 (1–0)	28 – Hardnett	9 – White	4 – Hardnett	Swinney Recreation Center (1,158); Kansas City, MO
January 5, 2020; 7:00 p.m., Roo Sports Network		Utah Valley	W 68–63	9–7 (2–0)	17 – Hardnett	9 – White	2 – Giles, Hardnett, Whitfield, McKissic, Nesbitt Jr.	Swinney Recreation Center (1,147); Kansas City, MO
January 9, 2020; 7:00 p.m., WAC DN		at UTRGV	L 64–76	9–8 (2–1)	17 – Hardnett	5 – McKissic	3 – Hardnett, Whitfield, McKissic	UTRGV Fieldhouse (708); Edinburg, TX
January 11, 2020; 5:00 p.m., ESPN+		at New Mexico State	L 71–74	9–9 (2–2)	16 – Giles	5 – Giles	5 – McKissic	Pan American Center (4,517); Las Cruces, NM
January 16, 2020; 7:00 p.m., Roo Sports Network		CSU Bakersfield	L 64–74 ^{OT}	9–10 (2–3)	19 – Giles	8 – Allick	5 – Hardnett	Swinney Recreation Center (1,216); Kansas City, MO
January 19, 2020; 4:00 p.m., Roo Sports Network		Grand Canyon	L 66–69	9–11 (2–4)	16 – McKissic	13 – Allick	4 – McKissic	Swinney Recreation Center (1,103); Kansas City, MO
January 25, 2020; 9:00 p.m., ESPN+		at California Baptist	W 67–57	10–11 (3–4)	16 – Kamgain	9 – Allick	3 – Giles, McKissic	CBU Events Center (4,047); Riverside, CA
January 27, 2020*; 7:00 p.m., Roo Sports Network		Crowley's Ridge	W 99–41	11–11	18 – Allick	9 – Allick	7 – Kamgain	Swinney Recreation Center (854); Kansas City, MO
February 1, 2020; 12:00 p.m., WAC DN		at Chicago State	W 69–51	12–11 (4–4)	21 – Whitfield	8 – White	4 – Williams, Kamgain	Emil and Patricia Jones Convocation Center (325); Chicago, IL
February 6, 2020; 7:00 p.m., Roo Sports Network		UTRGV	L 60–73	12–12 (4–5)	13 – Whitfield	7 – White	6 – Kamgain	Swinney Recreation Center (1,097); Kansas City, MO
February 8, 2020; 7:00 p.m., Roo Sports Network		New Mexico State	L 61–67	12–13 (4–6)	20 – Giles	7 – Giles	3 – Kamgain	Swinney Recreation Center (1,513); Kansas City, MO
February 13, 2020; 8:00 p.m., WAC DN		at Grand Canyon	L 66–71 ^{OT}	12–14 (4–7)	13 – Whitfield	7 – Allick	6 – Hardnett	GCU Arena (6,717); Phoenix, AZ
February 15, 2020; 9:00 p.m., WAC DN		at CSU Bakersfield	W 59–53	13–14 (5–7)	20 – McKissic	7 – White	3 – Hardnett, McKissic	Jimmie and Marjorie Icardo Center (1,909); Bakersfield, CA
February 19, 2020; 7:00 p.m., Roo Sports Network		California Baptist	W 69–63	14–14 (6–7)	17 – Giles	9 – White	3 – Nesbitt Jr.	Swinney Recreation Center (1,211); Kansas City, MO
February 29, 2020; 7:00 p.m., Roo Sports Network		Chicago State	W 80–58	15–14 (7–7)	16 – White	8 – White	5 – Williams	Swinney Recreation Center (1,599); Kansas City, MO
March 5, 2020; 8:00 p.m., WAC DN		at Utah Valley	W 61–51	16–14 (8–7)	18 – McKissic	8 – White	4 – Hardnett	UCCU Center (2,613); Orem, UT
March 7, 2020; 3:00 p.m., WAC DN		at Seattle	Canceled (COVID–19 pandemic)					Redhawk Center; Seattle, WA
WAC tournament
March 12, 2020*; 4:30 p.m., ESPN+	(5)	vs. (4) Grand Canyon; Quarterfinal	Canceled (COVID–19 pandemic)					Orleans Arena; Paradise, NV
*Non-conference game. ^{#}Rankings from AP poll. (#) Tournament seedings in parentheses. All times are in Central.
