= 2019–20 Utah Valley Wolverines men's basketball team =

American college basketball season

2019–20 Utah Valley Wolverines men's basketball
- Conference: Western Athletic Conference
- Record: 11–19 (5–10 WAC)
- Head coach: Mark Madsen (1st season)
- Assistant coaches: Todd Phillips; Todd Okeson; Jarred Jackson
- Home arena: UCCU Center

2019–20 WAC men's basketball standings
	Conf.				Overall
Team	W		L	PCT	W		L	PCT
New Mexico State	16	–	0	1.000	25	–	6	.806
California Baptist *	10	–	6	.625	21	–	10	.677
Texas–Rio Grande Valley	9	–	7	.563	14	–	16	.467
Kansas City	8	–	7	.533	16	–	14	.533
Seattle	7	–	7	.500	14	–	15	.483
Grand Canyon	8	–	8	.500	13	–	17	.433
Cal State Bakersfield	6	–	10	.375	12	–	19	.387
Utah Valley	5	–	10	.333	11	–	19	.367
Chicago State	0	–	14	.000	4	–	25	.138
* Ineligible for the 2020 NCAA tournament due to transition period. NOTE: The 2020 WAC tournament was canceled due to the COVID-19 pandemic.

The 2019–20 Utah Valley Wolverines men's basketball team represented Utah Valley University in the 2019–20 NCAA Division I men's basketball season. The Wolverines, led by first-year head coach Mark Madsen, played their home games at the UCCU Center in Orem, Utah as members of the Western Athletic Conference. They finished the season 11–19, 5–10 in WAC play to finish in finish in eighth place. Due to irregularities in the WAC standings due to cancelled games, they were set to be the No. 6 seed in the WAC tournament, however, the tournament was cancelled amid the COVID-19 pandemic.

== Previous season ==
The Wolverines finished the 2018–19 season with an overall record of 25–10, including 12–4 in WAC play, to finish in second place. In the 2019 WAC tournament, they defeated UMKC in the quarterfinals before losing to Grand Canyon in the semifinals the following day. On March 17, they accepted a bid to play in the 2019 College Basketball Invitational. They defeated Cal State Northridge in the first round before losing in the quarterfinals to South Florida.

This was Mark Pope's final season as head coach of Utah Valley; he replaced the retiring Dave Rose as head coach of the BYU men's basketball team.

== Roster ==
2019–20 Utah Valley Wolverines men's basketball team
Players
Coaches

Pos.	#	Name	Height	Weight	Year	Previous school	Hometown
G	0	Isaiah White	6 ft 7 in (2.01 m)	205 lb (93 kg)	Jr	Damien HS; Salt Lake CC	Rancho Cucamonga, CA
G	2	Jamison Overton	6 ft 6 in (1.98 m)	190 lb (86 kg)	Jr	Rancho Bernardo HS; Saddleback College	San Diego, CA
G	3	T. J. Washington	6 ft 0 in (1.83 m)	175 lb (79 kg)	Sr	Jenks HS; Coffeyville CC	Tulsa, OK
F	4	Emmanuel Olojakpoke	6 ft 8 in (2.03 m)	190 lb (86 kg)	Sr	Cypress Springs HS; Akron	Houston, TX
G	5	Ege Havsa	6 ft 4 in (1.93 m)	165 lb (75 kg)	RS Jr	Esenyurt Okyanus HS; Fordham	Istanbul, Turkey
F	10	Travis Wagstaff	6 ft 7 in (2.01 m)	185 lb (84 kg)	Fr	Olympus HS	Salt Lake City, UT
G	11	Brandon Averette	5 ft 11 in (1.8 m)	185 lb (84 kg)	RS Jr	Richardson HS; Oklahoma State	Richardson, TX
F/C	13	Brandon Morley	7 ft 0 in (2.13 m)	235 lb (107 kg)	Sr	Bingham HS; Utah	South Jordan, UT
F	15	Jacob Heese	6 ft 3 in (1.91 m)	200 lb (91 kg)	So	Desert Oasis HS; Howard (TX)	Las Vegas, NV
G	20	Bradley Kitchen	6 ft 3 in (1.91 m)	195 lb (88 kg)	Sr	Springville HS	Springville, UT
F	21	Fardaws Aimaq (redshirt)	6 ft 11 in (2.11 m)	245 lb (111 kg)	So	Steveston-London Secondary; Mercer	Vancouver, Canada
G/F	22	Casdon Jardine	6 ft 7 in (2.01 m)	218 lb (99 kg)	RS Jr	Twin Falls HS; Boise State	Twin Falls, ID
G	24	Trey Woodbury	6 ft 4 in (1.93 m)	200 lb (91 kg)	So	Clark HS; UNLV	Las Vegas, NV
G	32	Lewis Johnson	6 ft 5 in (1.96 m)	193 lb (88 kg)	Fr	Viewmont HS	Centerville, UT

Head coach

- Mark Madsen (Stanford)

Assistant coach(es)

- Todd Phillips (Lewis–Clark State)
- Todd Okeson (Nevada)
- Jarred Jackson (Liberty)

Legend

- (C) Team captain
- (S) Suspended
- (I) Ineligible
- (W) Walk-on
- Injured
- Current redshirt

Roster
Last update: November 27, 2019

== Schedule and results ==
Date time, TV	Rank^{#}	Opponent^{#}	Result	Record	Site (attendance) city, state
Exhibition
November 1, 2019*; 7:00pm		College of Idaho	W 59–42		Lockhart Arena; Orem, UT
Non-conference regular season
Nov 5, 2019*; 7:00 pm, WAC DN		Westminster (UT)	W 72–55	1–0	UCCU Center (2,091); Orem, UT
Nov 9, 2019*; 1:00 pm, Altitude		at Denver	L 62–74	1–1	Magness Arena (921); Denver, CO
Nov 12, 2019*; 7:00 pm, UVUtv/WAC DN		Ottawa (AZ)	W 101–70	2–1	UCCU Center (2,091); Orem, UT
Nov 15, 2019*; 6:00 pm, CSU.TV		at UAB; BBN Showcase	W 66–55	3–1	Bartow Arena (2,532); Birmingham, AL
Nov 18, 2019*; 5:00 pm, ESPN2		at No. 9 Kentucky; BBN Showcase	L 74–82	3–2	Rupp Arena (18,859); Lexington, KY
Nov 21, 2019*; 7:00 pm, WAC DN		Lamar; BBN Showcase	L 68–74	3–3	UCCU Center (1,928); Orem, UT
Nov 23, 2019*; 4:00 pm, ESPN3		at North Dakota State	W 68–62	4–3	Scheels Center (2,323); Fargo, ND
Nov 26, 2019*; 5:00 pm, NEC Front Row		at Mount St. Mary's; BBN Showcase	L 61–64	4–4	Knott Arena (1,405); Emmitsburg, MD
Dec 1, 2019*; 2:30 pm, MWN		at Colorado State	L 61–92	4–5	Moby Arena (3,168); Fort Collins, CO
Dec 4, 2019*; 7:00 pm, UVUtv/WAC DN		Weber State	L 67–72	4–6	UCCU Center (2,063); Orem, UT
Dec 7, 2019*; 2:00 pm, Pluto TV		at Southern Utah	L 72–73	4–7	America First Event Center (3,017); Cedar City, UT
Dec 14, 2019*; 7:30 pm, WAC DN		Northern Arizona	L 73–79	4–8	UCCU Center (1,582); Orem, UT
Dec 18, 2019*; 7:00 pm, MWN		at Wyoming	W 69–67	5–8	Arena-Auditorium (2,716); Laramie, WY
Dec 21, 2019*; 5:00 pm		at Long Beach State	L 65–68	5–9	Walter Pyramid (1,386); Long Beach, CA
Dec 28, 2019*; 7:30 pm, WAC DN		Antelope Valley	W 80–65	6–9	UCCU Center (1,949); Orem, UT
WAC regular season
Jan 2, 2020; 6:00 pm, WAC DN		at Chicago State	W 94–73	7–9 (1–0)	Jones Convocation Center (322); Chicago, IL
Jan 4, 2020; 6:00 pm, WAC DN		at Kansas City	L 63–68	7–10 (1–1)	Swinney Recreation Center (1,147); Kansas City, MO
Jan 11, 2020; 8:00 pm, WAC DN		at Seattle	L 50–83	7–11 (1–2)	Redhawk Center (999); Seattle, WA
Jan 16, 2020; 7:00 pm, WAC DN		New Mexico State	L 56–70	7–12 (1–3)	UCCU Center (2,119); Orem, UT
Jan 18, 2020; 2:00 pm, WAC DN		Texas–Rio Grande Valley	W 72–70	8–12 (2–3)	UCCU Center; Orem, UT
Jan 23, 2020; 8:00 pm, WAC DN		at Cal State Bakersfield	L 57–58	8–13 (2–4)	Icardo Center (2,071); Bakersfield, CA
Jan 25, 2020; 6:00 pm, WAC DN		at Grand Canyon	W 73–69	9–13 (3–4)	GCU Arena (7,034); Phoenix, AZ
Jan 28, 2020; 7:00 pm, WAC DN		California Baptist	L 61–65	9–14 (3–5)	UCCU Center (3,367); Orem, UT
Feb 8, 2020; 2:00 pm, WAC DN		Seattle	L 85–87 ^{OT}	9–15 (3–6)	UCCU Center (2,975); Orem, UT
Feb 13, 2020; 6:00 pm, WAC DN		at Texas–Rio Grande Valley	L 72–80	9–16 (3–7)	UTRGV Fieldhouse (2,218); Edinburg, TX
Feb 15, 2020; 4:00 pm, WAC DN		at New Mexico State	L 82–84	9–17 (3–8)	Pan American Center (5,492); Las Cruces, NM
Feb 20, 2020; 7:00 pm, WAC DN		Cal State Bakersfield	W 72–58	10–17 (4–8)	UCCU Center (2,029); Orem, UT
Feb 22, 2020; 2:00 pm, WAC DN		Grand Canyon	W 92–80	11–17 (5–8)	UCCU Center (5,236); Orem, UT
Feb 26, 2020; 8:00 pm, WAC DN		at California Baptist	L 66–73	11–18 (5–9)	CBU Events Center (2,834); Riverside, CA
Mar 5, 2020; 7:00 pm, WAC DN		Kansas City	L 51–61	11–19 (5–10)	UCCU Center (2,613); Orem, UT
Mar 7, 2020; 2:00 pm, WAC DN		Chicago State	Cancelled due to the COVID-19 pandemic		UCCU Center; Orem UT
WAC tournament
Mar 12, 2020; 9:30 pm, ESPN+	(6)	vs. (3) Seattle; Quarterfinals	Cancelled due to the COVID-19 pandemic		Orleans Arena; Paradise, NV
*Non-conference game. ^{#}Rankings from AP Poll. (#) Tournament seedings in parentheses. All times are in Mountain Time.
