= 2019–20 Texas–Rio Grande Valley Vaqueros men's basketball team =

American college basketball season

2019–20 Texas–Rio Grande Valley Vaqueros men's basketball
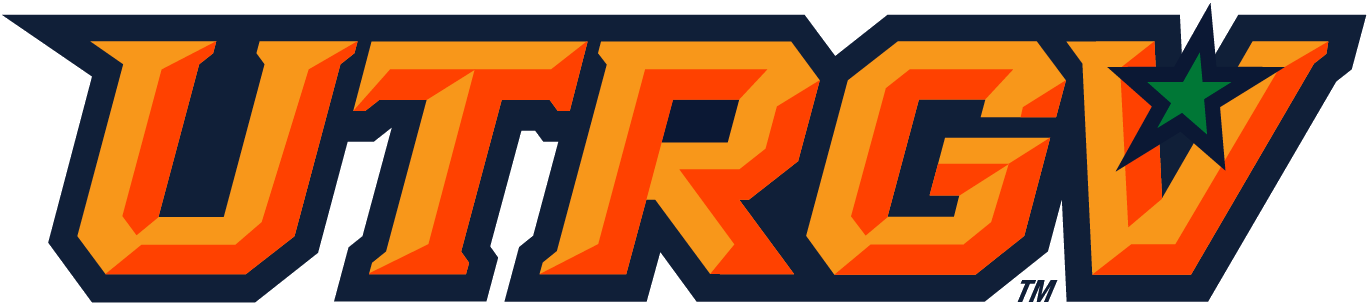
- Conference: Western Athletic Conference
- Record: 14–16 (9–7 WAC)
- Head coach: Lew Hill (4th season)
- Assistant coaches: Jai Steadman; Kenya Crandell; Luke Mackay
- Home arena: UTRGV Fieldhouse

2019–20 WAC men's basketball standings
	Conf.				Overall
Team	W		L	PCT	W		L	PCT
New Mexico State	16	–	0	1.000	25	–	6	.806
California Baptist *	10	–	6	.625	21	–	10	.677
Texas–Rio Grande Valley	9	–	7	.563	14	–	16	.467
Kansas City	8	–	7	.533	16	–	14	.533
Seattle	7	–	7	.500	14	–	15	.483
Grand Canyon	8	–	8	.500	13	–	17	.433
Cal State Bakersfield	6	–	10	.375	12	–	19	.387
Utah Valley	5	–	10	.333	11	–	19	.367
Chicago State	0	–	14	.000	4	–	25	.138
* Ineligible for the 2020 NCAA tournament due to transition period. NOTE: The 2020 WAC tournament was canceled due to the COVID-19 pandemic.

The 2019–20 Texas–Rio Grande Valley Vaqueros men's basketball team represented the University of Texas Rio Grande Valley in the 2019–20 NCAA Division I men's basketball season. The Vaqueros, led by fourth-year head coach Lew Hill, played their home games at the UTRGV Fieldhouse in Edinburg, Texas as members of the Western Athletic Conference. They finished the season 14–16, 9–7 in WAC play to finish in third place. They were set to be the No. 2 seed in the WAC tournament, however, the tournament was cancelled amid the COVID-19 pandemic.

== Previous season ==
The Vaqueros finished the 2018–19 season 20–17, 9–7 in WAC play to finish in 4th place. In the WAC tournament, they defeated Cal State Bakersfield in the quarterfinals, before falling to top-seeded New Mexico State in the semifinals. They received an invitation to the CollegeInsider.com Tournament, where they defeated Grambling State in the first round, before losing to Texas Southern in the second round.

== Roster ==
2019–20 Texas–Rio Grande Valley Vaqueros men's basketball team
Players
Coaches

Pos.	#	Name	Height	Weight	Year	Hometown
G	0	Chris Freeman	6 ft 6 in (1.98 m)	190 lb (86 kg)	Jr	Winston-Salem, North Carolina
F	1	Sean Rhea	6 ft 8 in (2.03 m)	230 lb (104 kg)	RS So	Houston, Texas
G	2	Quinton Johnson II	6 ft 4 in (1.93 m)	195 lb (88 kg)	RS Fr	Oklahoma City, Oklahoma
F	3	Connor Raines	6 ft 6 in (1.98 m)	190 lb (86 kg)	Fr	Beacon Falls, Connecticut
G	4	Ricky "Doc" Nelson	6 ft 1 in (1.85 m)	170 lb (77 kg)	Jr	Houston, Texas
F	5	Jamal Gaines	6 ft 8 in (2.03 m)	225 lb (102 kg)	RS Fr	Red Oak, Texas
G	10	Nick Mora	6 ft 1 in (1.85 m)	167 lb (76 kg)	RS Jr	Weslaco, Texas
F	11	Lesley Varner II	6 ft 7 in (2.01 m)	190 lb (86 kg)	Sr	Cedar Hill, Texas
G	12	Rob McClain Jr.	6 ft 5 in (1.96 m)	185 lb (84 kg)	Jr	Red Lake, Minnesota
G	14	Javon Levi	5 ft 11 in (1.8 m)	175 lb (79 kg)	Jr	Killeen, Texas
G	15	Uche Dibiamaka	6 ft 4 in (1.93 m)	195 lb (88 kg)	So	Adelaide, SA, Australia
G	20	Isaiah Garcia	5 ft 10 in (1.78 m)	160 lb (73 kg)	Fr	Weslaco, Texas
F	21	Isaiah Fontaine	6 ft 9 in (2.06 m)	200 lb (91 kg)	Sr	Chelsea, Massachusetts
G	22	Jordan Jackson	6 ft 3 in (1.91 m)	180 lb (82 kg)	GS	Houston, Texas
F	23	Anthony Bratton	6 ft 8 in (2.03 m)	236 lb (107 kg)	Jr	Omaha, Nebraska
F	24	Marek Nelson	6 ft 7 in (2.01 m)	190 lb (86 kg)	Jr	Plano, Texas

Head coach

- Lew Hill (Wichita State)

Assistant coach(es)

- Jai Steadman (Nebraska)
- Kenya Crandell (Nebraska–Kearney)
- Luke Mackay (East Carolina)

Legend

- (C) Team captain
- (S) Suspended
- (I) Ineligible
- (W) Walk-on
- Injured
- Current redshirt

Roster
Last update: December 26, 2019

== Schedule and results ==
Date time, TV	Rank^{#}	Opponent^{#}	Result	Record	Site (attendance) city, state
Regular season
November 5, 2019*; 7:00 pm, ESPN+		at South Dakota State	L 57–70	0–1	Frost Arena (1,704); Brookings, SD
November 11, 2019*; 7:00 pm, WAC DN		Howard Payne	W 93–42	1–1	UTRGV Fieldhouse (976); Edinburg, TX
November 15, 2019*; 5:00 pm, Team1Sports		vs. North Dakota State; Islander Invitational	L 70–76	1–2	American Bank Center (209); Corpus Christi, TX
November 16, 2019*; 4:00 pm, Team1Sports		vs. Stony Brook; Islander Invitational	L 58–69	1–3	American Bank Center (457); Corpus Christi, TX
November 17, 2019*; 4:00 pm		at Texas A&M–Corpus Christi; South Texas Showdown	L 55–63	1–4	American Bank Center (978); Corpus Christi, TX
November 25, 2019*; 7:00 pm, WAC DN		Texas A&M International	W 79–52	2–4	UTRGV Fieldhouse (1,005); Edinburg, TX
November 30, 2019*; 7:00 pm, WAC DN		Texas A&M–Corpus Christi; South Texas Showdown	L 52–55	2–5	UTRGV Fieldhouse (1,760); Edinburg, TX
December 3, 2019*; 7:00 pm, WAC DN		Sam Houston State	W 90–86 ^{2OT}	3–5	UTRGV Fieldhouse (1,196); Edinburg, TX
December 6, 2019*; 7:00 pm, WAC DN		Mid-America Christian	W 92–50	4–5	UTRGV Fieldhouse (718); Edinburg, TX
December 13, 2019*; 7:00 pm, FS1		at Creighton	L 58–89	4–6	CHI Health Center Omaha (16,346); Omaha, NE
December 15, 2019*; 12:30 pm		at Omaha; Summit League/WAC Challenge	L 82–92	4–7	Baxter Arena (2,840); Omaha, NE
December 21, 2019*; 1:00 pm, FSSW+		at No. 24 Texas Tech	L 58–68	4–8	United Supermarkets Arena (13,516); Lubbock, TX
December 30, 2019*; 6:00 pm, FSOK		at Oklahoma	L 72–91	4–9	Lloyd Noble Center (6,755); Norman, OK
January 2, 2020; 9:00 pm, WAC DN		at California Baptist	L 67–76	4–10 (0–1)	CBU Events Center (2,493); Riverside, CA
January 9, 2020; 7:00 pm, WAC DN		Kansas City	W 76–64	5–10 (1–1)	UTRGV Fieldhouse (708); Edinburg, TX
January 11, 2020; 7:00 pm, WAC DN		Chicago State	W 87–63	6–10 (1–2)	UTRGV Fieldhouse (1,085); Edinburg, TX
January 16, 2020; 9:00 pm, WAC DN		at Seattle	L 74–91	6–1 (2–2)	Redhawk Center (862); Seattle, WA
January 18, 2020; 3:00 pm, WAC DN		at Utah Valley	L 70–72	6–12 (2–3)	UCCU Center; Orem, UT
January 25, 2020; 7:00 pm, WAC DN		New Mexico State	L 62–67	6–13 (2–4)	UTRGV Fieldhouse (2,618); Edinburg, TX
January 30, 2020; 7:00 pm, ESPN+		Grand Canyon	L 79–87	6–14 (2–5)	UTRGV Fieldhouse (1,165); Edinburg, TX
February 1, 2020; 7:00 pm, WAC DN		Cal State Bakersfield	W 70–59	7–14 (3–5)	UTRGV Fieldhouse (1,065); Edinburg, TX
February 6, 2020; 7:00 pm, WAC DN		at Kansas City	W 73–60	8–14 (4–5)	Swinney Recreation Center (1,097); Kansas City, MO
February 8, 2020; 12:00 pm, WAC DN		at Chicago State	W 75–64	9–14 (5–5)	Jones Convocation Center (378); Chicago, IL
February 13, 2020; 7:00 pm, WAC DN		Utah Valley	W 80–72	10–14 (6–5)	UTRGV Fieldhouse (2,218); Edinburg, TX
February 15, 2020; 7:00 pm, WAC DN		Seattle	W 79–72	11–14 (7–5)	UTRGV Fieldhouse (1,667); Edinburg, TX
February 18, 2020*; 12:00 pm, WAC DN		UT Permian Basin	W 93–80	12–14	UTRGV Fieldhouse (1,012); Edinburg, TX
February 22, 2020; 8:00 pm, WAC DN		at New Mexico State	L 62–78	12–15 (7–6)	Pan American Center (11,680); Las Cruces, NM
February 27, 2020; 9:00 pm, ESPN3		at Cal State Bakersfield	L 59–79	12–16 (7–7)	Icardo Center (2,134); Bakersfield, CA
February 29, 2020; 7:00 pm, WAC DN		at Grand Canyon	W 88–80	13–16 (8–7)	GCU Arena (7,002); Phoenix, AZ
March 7, 2020; 7:00 pm, WAC DN		California Baptist	W 79–76 ^{OT}	14–16 (9–7)	UTRGV Fieldhouse (1,523); Edinburg, TX
WAC tournament
Mar 12, 2020; 8:00 pm, ESPN+	(2)	vs. (7) Cal State Bakersfield; Quarterfinals	Cancelled due to the COVID-19 pandemic		Orleans Arena; Paradise, NV
*Non-conference game. ^{#}Rankings from AP Poll. (#) Tournament seedings in parentheses. All times are in Central.
