= 2020 WAC men's basketball tournament =

- Classification: Division I
- Season: 2019–20
- Teams: 8
- Site: Orleans Arena; Paradise, Nevada
- Television: ESPN+, ESPNU

2019–20 WAC men's basketball standings
	Conf.				Overall
Team	W		L	PCT	W		L	PCT
New Mexico State	16	–	0	1.000	25	–	6	.806
California Baptist *	10	–	6	.625	21	–	10	.677
Texas–Rio Grande Valley	9	–	7	.563	14	–	16	.467
Kansas City	8	–	7	.533	16	–	14	.533
Seattle	7	–	7	.500	14	–	15	.483
Grand Canyon	8	–	8	.500	13	–	17	.433
Cal State Bakersfield	6	–	10	.375	12	–	19	.387
Utah Valley	5	–	10	.333	11	–	19	.367
Chicago State	0	–	14	.000	4	–	25	.138
* Ineligible for the 2020 NCAA tournament due to transition period. NOTE: The 2020 WAC tournament was canceled due to the COVID-19 pandemic.

The 2020 WAC men's basketball tournament was to be the postseason men's basketball tournament for the Western Athletic Conference during the 2019–20 season. All tournament games were to be played at the Orleans Arena in Paradise, Nevada, from March 12–14, 2020. The tournament champion would have received the WAC's automatic bid to the 2020 NCAA tournament.

On March 12, both the WAC Tournament and the NCAA Tournaments were cancelled amid the COVID-19 pandemic.

== Seeds ==
8 of the 9 teams in the WAC were eligible to compete in the conference tournament. California Baptist was ineligible due to their transition from Division II to Division I. Teams were seeded by record within the conference, with a tiebreaker system to seed teams with identical conference records.

Seed	School	Conference Record	Seeding ° Record	Tiebreaker 1	Tiebreaker 2
1	New Mexico State	16–0	16–0		
2	UT Rio Grande Valley	9–7	9–7	1–1 v SU	1–1 v CBU
3	Seattle	7–7	9–7	1–1 v UTRGV	0–2 v CBU
4	Grand Canyon	8–8	8–8	2–0 v UMKC	
5	Kansas City	8–7	8–8	0–2 v GCU	
6	Utah Valley	5–10	6–10	1–1 v CSUB	2–0 v GCU
7	CSU Bakersfield	6–10	6–10	1–1 v UVU	1–1 v GCU
8	Chicago State	0–14	0–16		

° Solely for the purposes of tournament seeding, the conference added two losses to Chicago State, one loss to Kansas City, one win to Utah Valley and two wins to Seattle's conference records for those games not played on March 5th (Chicago State at Seattle) and 7th (Chicago State at Utah Valley, Kansas City at Seattle), 2020. The conference then applied their standard tiebreaking formulas against the revised results to break any ties.

== Schedule and results ==
Game	Time	Matchup	Score	Television
Quarterfinals – Thursday, March 12
1	12:00 pm	No. 1 New Mexico State vs. No. 8 Chicago State	canceled	ESPN+
2	2:30 pm	No. 4 Grand Canyon vs. No. 5 Kansas City	canceled	ESPN+
3	6:00 pm	No. 2 UT Rio Grande Valley vs. No. 7 CSU Bakersfield	canceled	ESPN+
4	8:30 pm	No. 3 Seattle vs. No. 6 Utah Valley	canceled	ESPN+
Semifinals – Friday, March 13
5	6:00 pm	Game 1 winner vs. Game 2 winner	canceled	ESPN+
6	8:30 pm	Game 3 winner vs. Game 4 winner	canceled	ESPN+
Final – Saturday, March 14
7	7:00 pm	Game 5 winner vs. Game 6 winner	canceled	ESPNU
Game times in Pacific Daylight Time (PDT). Rankings denote tournament seed.

== Bracket ==
Quarterfinals; March 12; ESPN+
1	New Mexico State
8	Chicago State
4	Grand Canyon
5	Kansas City
2	UT Rio Grande Valley
7	CSU Bakersfield
3	Seattle
6	Utah Valley

Semifinals; March 13; ESPN+

Final; March 14; ESPNU
