= Lesley Varner II =

American basketball player (born 1998)

No. 11 – MZT Skopje
- Position: Small forward
- League: Macedonian League

Personal information
- Born: April 29, 1998 (age 28) Dallas, Texas, USA
- Listed height: 6 ft 7 in (2.01 m)
- Listed weight: 190 lb (86 kg)

Career information
- High school: Cedar Hill (Cedar Hill, Texas)
- College: UT Rio Grande Valley (2016–2020)
- NBA draft: 2020: undrafted
- Playing career: 2021–present

Career history
- 2021–2022: UBSC Graz
- 2022: Newcastle Eagles
- 2022–2023: Kapfenberg Bulls
- 2023–2024: Slavia Prague
- 2024–2025: Sluneta Ústí nad Labem
- 2025–2026: Koroivos
- 2026: Jonava Hipocredit
- 2026–present: MZT Skopje

Career highlights
- First-team All-WAC (2020)

Lesley Varner II (born April 29, 1998) is an American professional basketball player for MZT Skopje of the Macedonian League. He played college basketball for the Texas–Rio Grande Valley Vaqueros.

== Early life ==
Varner attended Cedar Hill High School. During his senior season, he guided the team to a 25–7 record and 11th ranking in Texas. Varner committed to play college basketball at Texas–Rio Grande Valley, turning down offers from Arkansas–Pine Bluff, UC Riverside, and Milwaukee. He stated that he knew Texas–Rio Grande Valley was a good fit after his visit, and he connected with coach Lew Hill.

== College career ==
After posting his first double-double with 14 points and 11 rebounds in an 85–77 win against Chicago State, Varner was named WAC player of the week on January 24, 2017. Varner averaged 11.2 points, 5.4 rebounds, and 1.4 steals per game as a junior. On December 3, 2019, he scored 33 points and had 13 rebounds, both career-highs, while tying his career-high with five steals in a 90–86 overtime win against Sam Houston State. As a senior, Varner averaged 15.6 points, 6.0 rebounds, 1.7 assists and 1.5 steals per game, while shooting 43.3 percent from the field. He was named to the First Team All-WAC. Varner finished his career with 1,182 points, 16th highest in school history.

== Professional career ==
Varner signed his first professional contract with UBSC Graz of the Austrian Basketball Superliga on August 26, 2021.

On 21 January 2026, Varner signed with Jonava Hipocredit of the Lithuanian Basketball League (LKL).

== Career statistics ==
Legend
GP	Games played	GS	Games started	MPG	Minutes per game
FG%	Field goal percentage	3P%	3-point field goal percentage	FT%	Free throw percentage
RPG	Rebounds per game	APG	Assists per game	SPG	Steals per game
BPG	Blocks per game	PPG	Points per game	**Bold**	Career high

=== College ===
Year	Team	GP	GS	MPG	FG%	3P%	FT%	RPG	APG	SPG	BPG	PPG
2016–17	Texas–Rio Grande Valley	32	3	14.8	.357	.276	.647	2.3	.9	.8	.2	4.1
2017–18	Texas–Rio Grande Valley	33	5	16.9	.374	.269	.714	3.2	.6	1.0	.3	5.1
2018–19	Texas–Rio Grande Valley	**37**	**37**	26.1	**.469**	.290	.633	5.4	1.1	1.4	**.4**	11.2
2019–20	Texas–Rio Grande Valley	30	30	**28.0**	.433	**.406**	**.871**	**6.0**	**1.7**	**1.5**	.3	**15.6**
Career		132	75	21.5	.426	.322	.736	4.2	1.1	1.2	.3	8.9
