= 2019–20 New Mexico State Aggies men's basketball team =

American college basketball season

2019–20 New Mexico State Aggies men's basketball

WAC regular season champions
- Conference: Western Athletic Conference
- Record: 25–6 (16–0 WAC)
- Head coach: Chris Jans (3rd season)
- Assistant coaches: James Miller; David Anwar; Corey Barker
- Home arena: Pan American Center

2019–20 WAC men's basketball standings
	Conf.				Overall
Team	W		L	PCT	W		L	PCT
New Mexico State	16	–	0	1.000	25	–	6	.806
California Baptist *	10	–	6	.625	21	–	10	.677
Texas–Rio Grande Valley	9	–	7	.563	14	–	16	.467
Kansas City	8	–	7	.533	16	–	14	.533
Seattle	7	–	7	.500	14	–	15	.483
Grand Canyon	8	–	8	.500	13	–	17	.433
Cal State Bakersfield	6	–	10	.375	12	–	19	.387
Utah Valley	5	–	10	.333	11	–	19	.367
Chicago State	0	–	14	.000	4	–	25	.138
* Ineligible for the 2020 NCAA tournament due to transition period. NOTE: The 2020 WAC tournament was canceled due to the COVID-19 pandemic.

The 2019–20 New Mexico State Aggies men's basketball team represented New Mexico State University during the 2019–20 NCAA Division I men's basketball season. The Aggies were led by third-year head Chris Jans, and played their home games at the Pan American Center in Las Cruces, New Mexico as members of the Western Athletic Conference. They finished the season 25–6, 16–0 in WAC play to win the WAC regular season championship. They were set to be the No. 1 seed in the WAC tournament, however, the tournament was cancelled amid the COVID-19 pandemic. Due to the WAC Tournament cancellation, they were awarded the WAC's automatic bid to the NCAA tournament. However, the NCAA Tournament was also cancelled due to the same outbreak.

== Previous season ==
The Aggies finished the 2018–19 season 30–5, 15–1 in WAC play to win the WAC regular season championship. They defeated Chicago State, Texas-Rio Grande Valley, and Grand Canyon to win the WAC tournament. As a result, they received the WAC's automatic bid to the NCAA tournament where they lost in the first round to Auburn.

== Roster ==
2019–20 New Mexico State Aggies men's basketball team
Players
Coaches

Pos.	#	Name	Height	Weight	Year	Previous school	Hometown
G	1	Shunn Buchanan	6 ft 0 in (1.83 m)	170 lb (77 kg)	Sr	Madison Central HS; Northeast Mississippi CC	Durant, MS
G	2	Tennessee Owens	5 ft 10 in (1.78 m)	165 lb (75 kg)	RS So	Centennial HS; Alabama–Huntsville	Las Cruces, NM
G	3	Terrell Brown	6 ft 1 in (1.85 m)	165 lb (75 kg)	Sr	Moreau Catholic HS; CCSF	Hayward, CA
G	5	Clayton Henry	6 ft 4 in (1.93 m)	195 lb (88 kg)	Sr	Bishop McNally HS; Palm Beach State	Calgary, Alberta, Canada
G	10	Sir'Jabari Rice	6 ft 4 in (1.93 m)	165 lb (75 kg)	RS So	Fort Bend Marshall HS	Houston, TX
G	12	AJ Harris	5 ft 9 in (1.75 m)	170 lb (77 kg)	RS Sr	Dunbar HS; Ohio State	Dayton, OH
F	13	C.J. Bobbitt	6 ft 7 in (2.01 m)	225 lb (102 kg)	RS Sr	Harker Heights HS; Denver	Killeen, TX
F	15	Ivan Aurrecoechea	6 ft 8 in (2.03 m)	240 lb (109 kg)	Sr	Canarias Basketball Academy; Indian Hills CC	Madrid, Spain
G	20	Dajour Joseph	6 ft 6 in (1.98 m)	205 lb (93 kg)	Jr	Boyd H. Anderson HS; South Plains College	Ft. Lauderdale, FL
G	21	Trevelin Queen	6 ft 6 in (1.98 m)	190 lb (86 kg)	Sr	North County HS	Glen Burnie, MD
F	22	Wilfried Likayi	6 ft 9 in (2.06 m)	210 lb (95 kg)	Jr	Parkrose HS; Casper College	Portland, OR
F	24	William McNair	6 ft 9 in (2.06 m)	210 lb (95 kg)	Jr	Martin Luther King HS	Philadelphia, PA
F	25	Robert Brown	6 ft 9 in (2.06 m)	230 lb (104 kg)	RS So	Advanced Preparatory International	Dallas, TX
F	35	Johnny McCants	6 ft 7 in (2.01 m)	225 lb (102 kg)	RS Jr	Oñate HS	Las Cruces, NM
G	55	Shawn Williams	6 ft 1 in (1.85 m)	175 lb (79 kg)	Jr	Southwest Christian Academy; East Carolina	Little Rock, AR
F		Rashaun Agee	6 ft 7 in (2.01 m)	210 lb (95 kg)	Fr	Bogan HS	Chicago, IL
G		Evan Gilyard	5 ft 10 in (1.78 m)	170 lb (77 kg)	Jr	Simeon Career Academy; UTEP	Chicago, IL
G		Jihaun Westbrook	6 ft 7 in (2.01 m)	175 lb (79 kg)	Fr	Serrando HS	Adelanto, CA

Head coach

- Chris Jans (Loras)

Assistant coach(es)

- James Miller (CSU Pueblo)
- David Anwar (Fitchburg State)
- Corey Barker (Prairie View A&M)

Legend

- (C) Team captain
- (S) Suspended
- (I) Ineligible
- (W) Walk-on
- Injured
- Current redshirt

Roster
Last update: October 3, 2019

== Schedule and results ==
Date time, TV	Rank^{#}	Opponent^{#}	Result	Record	High points	High rebounds	High assists	Site (attendance) city, state
Non-conference regular season
Nov 5, 2019*; 7:00 pm, WAC DN		Western New Mexico	W 92–46	1–0	21 – Rice	8 – McCants	4 – Queen	Pan American Center (5,066); Las Cruces, NM
Nov 12, 2019*; 7:00 pm		at UTEP; Battle of I-10	L 50–65	1–1	21 – Queen	7 – Tied	4 – Queen	Don Haskins Center (8,993); El Paso, TX
Nov 14, 2019*; 7:00 pm, AggieVision		Southern	W 79–63	2–1	20 – Queen	6 – Aurrecoechea	7 – Buchanan	Pan American Center (5,929); Las Cruces, NM
Nov 17, 2019*; 12:00 pm, P12N		at No. 19 Arizona	L 53–83	2–2	14 – Rice	7 – Queen	3 – Buchanan	McKale Center (13,161); Tucson, AZ
Nov 21, 2019*; 7:00 pm, AggieVision		New Mexico; Rio Grande Rivalry	L 77–78	2–3	23 – Queen	9 – Queen	5 – Brown	Pan American Center (7,268); Las Cruces, NM
Nov 25, 2019*; 11:00 am, FloSports		vs. Colorado State; Cayman Islands Classic Quarterfinals	W 78–70 ^{OT}	3–3	21 – Rice	8 – Rice	3 – Buchanan	John Gray Gymnasium (1,251); George Town, Cayman Islands
Nov 26, 2019*; 1:30 pm, FloSports		vs. South Florida; Cayman Islands Classic Semifinals	W 65–45	4–3	13 – Williams	7 – Tied	5 – Buchanan	John Gray Gymnasium (755); George Town, Cayman Islands
Nov 27, 2019*; 5:30 pm, FloSports		vs. George Mason; Cayman Islands Classic Final	L 64–68	4–4	19 – Rice	8 – McCants	5 – Buchanan	John Gray Gymnasium (1,492); George Town, Cayman Islands
Dec 3, 2019*; 7:00 pm		UTEP; Battle of I-10	W 59–56	5–4	14 – Bobbitt	7 – Aurrecoechea	4 – Queen	Pan American Center (7,048); Las Cruces, NM
Dec 7, 2019*; 1:00 pm, P12N		vs. Washington State	L 54–63	5–5	14 – Tied	9 – Rice	4 – Buchanan	Spokane Arena (1,222); Spokane, WA
Dec 10, 2019*; 7:00 pm		at Denver	W 72–67	6–5	18 – Rice	8 – Rice	7 – Queen	Magness Arena (910); Denver, CO
Dec 14, 2019*; 5:00 pm, ATTSNRM		at New Mexico; Rio Grande Rivalry	L 62–69	6–6	19 – Queen	9 – McCants	8 – Queen	Dreamstyle Arena (14,488); Albuquerque, NM
Dec 18, 2019*; 7:00 pm, WAC DN		Arkansas–Pine Bluff	W 65–40	7–6	19 – Aurrecoechea	9 – Aurrecoechea	3 – Queen	Pan American Center (4,288); Las Cruces, NM
Dec 22, 2019*; 1:00 pm, SECN		vs. Mississippi State	W 58–52	8–6	18 – McCants	10 – Queen	3 – Gilyard	Mississippi Coliseum (2,761); Jackson, MS
Dec 29, 2019*; 4:00 pm, WAC DN		Northern New Mexico	W 104–30	9–6	17 – Queen	6 – Aurrecoechea	8 – Queen	Pan American Center (4,490); Las Cruces, NM
WAC Regular Season
Jan 4, 2020; 8:00 pm, WAC DN		at California Baptist	W 86–71	10–6 (1–0)	20 – Aurrecoechea	8 – Aurrecoechea	4 – Tied	CBU Events Center (4,754); Riverside, CA
Jan 9, 2020; 7:00 pm, WAC DN		Chicago State	W 93–54	11–6 (2–0)	17 – Queen	8 – Aurrecoechea	9 – Buchanan	Pan American Center (4,367); Las Cruces, NM
Jan 11, 2020; 4:00 pm, ESPN+		Kansas City	W 74–71	12–6 (3–0)	18 – Brown	10 – Rice	6 – Rice	Pan American Center (4,517); Las Cruces, NM
Jan 16, 2020; 7:00 pm, ESPN+		at Utah Valley	W 70–56	13–6 (4–0)	17 – Tied	8 – McCants	3 – Tied	UCCU Center (2,119); Orem, UT
Jan 18, 2020; 8:00 pm, WAC DN		at Seattle	W 75–67	14–6 (5–0)	19 – Aurrecoechea	11 – Tied	3 – Buchanan	Redhawk Center (999); Seattle, WA
Jan 25, 2020; 6:00 pm, WAC DN		at Texas–Rio Grande Valley	W 67–62	15–6 (6–0)	19 – Aurrecoechea	7 – McCants	4 – Rice	UTRGV Fieldhouse (2,618); Edinburg, TX
Jan 30, 2020; 7:00 pm, AggieVision		Cal State Bakersfield	W 61–57	16–6 (7–0)	23 – Aurrecoechea	8 – Aurrecoechea	3 – Gilyard	Pan American Center (5,126); Las Cruces, NM
Feb 1, 2020; 7:00 pm, AggieVision		Grand Canyon	W 72–52	17–6 (8–0)	18 – Rice	12 – McCants	5 – Tied	Pan American Center (13,960); Las Cruces, NM
Feb 6, 2020; 6:00 pm, WAC DN		at Chicago State	W 71–49	18–6 (9–0)	15 – Williams	6 – Aurrecoechea	4 – Buchanan	Jones Convocation Center; Chicago, IL
Feb 8, 2020; 6:00 pm, WAC DN		at Kansas City	W 67–61	19–6 (10–0)	23 – Aurrecoechea	9 – McCants	3 – Brown	Municipal Auditorium (1,513); Kansas City, MO
Feb 13, 2020; 7:00 pm, AggieVision		Seattle	W 72–64	20–6 (11–0)	16 – Brown	18 – McCants	3 – Tied	Pan American Center (4,794); Las Cruces, NM
Feb 15, 2020; 4:00 pm, AggieVision		Utah Valley	W 84–82	21–6 (12–0)	29 – Rice	8 – Rice	6 – Buchanan	Pan American Center (5,492); Las Cruces, NM
Feb 22, 2020; 7:00 pm, AggieVision		Texas–Rio Grande Valley	W 78–62	22–6 (13–0)	20 – Rice	10 – Aurrecoechea	5 – Rice	Pan American Center (11,680); Las Cruces, NM
Feb 27, 2020; 7:00 pm, ESPN3		at Grand Canyon	W 67–53	23–6 (14–0)	16 – Rice	9 – Rice	12 – Buchanan	GCU Arena (7,155); Phoenix, AZ
Feb 29, 2020; 8:00 pm, ESPN3		at Cal State Bakersfield	W 62–46	24–6 (15–0)	14 – McCants	6 – McCants	6 – Gilyard	Icardo Center (2,947); Bakersfield, CA
Mar 5, 2020; 7:00 pm, Aggievision		California Baptist	W 83–50	25–6 (16–0)	19 – Queen	8 – Aurrecoechea	4 – Gilyard	Pan American Center (7,015); Las Cruces, NM
WAC tournament
Mar 12, 2020; 1:00 pm, ESPN+	(1)	vs. (8) Chicago State; Quarterfinals	Cancelled due to the COVID-19 pandemic					Orleans Arena; Paradise, NV
*Non-conference game. ^{#}Rankings from AP Poll. (#) Tournament seedings in parentheses. All times are in Mountain Time Source.
