= Lew Hill (basketball) =

American basketball coach (1965–2021)

Biographical details
- Born: April 11, 1965; Clinton, North Carolina, U.S.
- Died: February 7, 2021 (aged 55); Edinburg, Texas, U.S.

Playing career
- 1983–1985: San Jacinto
- 1985–1988: Wichita State
- 1988–1989: DTV Charlottenburg

Coaching career (HC unless noted)
- 1989–1990: Wichita East HS (assistant)
- 1990–1992: South Alabama (assistant)
- 1992–1994: SE Missouri State (assistant)
- 1994–1998: East Carolina (assistant)
- 1998–2004: Texas A&M (assistant)
- 2004–2011: UNLV (assistant)
- 2011–2016: Oklahoma (assistant)
- 2016–2021: Texas–Rio Grande Valley

Head coaching record
- Overall: 67–77 (.465)
- Tournaments: 0–1 (CBI); 1–1 (CIT)

Accomplishments and honors

Awards
- WAC Coach of the Year (2021); Skip Prosser Man of the Year Award (2021)

Lewis Daniel Hill (April 11, 1965 – February 7, 2021) was an American basketball coach. He was the head coach for the University of Texas–Rio Grande Valley (UTRGV) Vaqueros men's basketball team.

== Playing career ==
Hill, a 1983 graduate of Mount Vernon High School in the state of New York, began his college career at San Jacinto College where he helped the team win the 1984 NJCAA Division I men's basketball championship title, while also earning JUCO All-American honors. Hill completed his college career at Wichita State under Eddie Fogler, earning All-Missouri Valley Conference honors as a senior.

In the 1988–89 season, Hill played professionally for DTV Charlottenburg in the German Basketball Bundesliga and in the FIBA Korać Cup. A car accident ended his playing days.

== Coaching career ==
After his playing career, Hill got his coaching start at Wichita East High School as an assistant coach for one season before entering the college ranks to join the staff of South Alabama. Following stops at SE Missouri State and East Carolina, Hill joined Melvin Watkins's staff at Texas A&M, where he stayed until 2004.

Hill then joined Lon Kruger's staff at UNLV, and followed him to Oklahoma, where he was part of eight NCAA tournament appearances, including a Final Four appearance by the Sooners during the 2015–16 season.

In 2016, Hill accepted the head coaching position at Texas–Rio Grande Valley, replacing Dan Hipsher. At the close of the 2020–21 season he was posthumously named the Western Athletic Conference Coach of the Year. He was also posthumously named as the recipient of the 2021 Skip Prosser Man of the Year Award.

== Death ==
Hill developed COVID-19 in late January 2021, during the COVID-19 pandemic in Texas, while battling other medical issues. He was preparing to step down amid his fifth season as head coach at UTRGV, when he died on February 7, 2021, at age 55. He is survived by his wife and their two children and three other children from previous relationships.

== Head coaching record ==
Record table
Season	Team	Overall	Conference	Standing	Postseason
Texas–Rio Grande Valley Vaqueros (Western Athletic Conference) (2016–2021)
2016–17	Texas–Rio Grande Valley	10–22	2–12	7th	
2017–18	Texas–Rio Grande Valley	15–18	6–8	5th	CBI first round
2018–19	Texas–Rio Grande Valley	20–17	9–7	4th	CIT second round
2019–20	Texas–Rio Grande Valley	14–16	9–7	3rd	
2020–21	Texas–Rio Grande Valley	8–4	2–0		
Texas–Rio Grande Valley:		67–77 (.465)	28–34 (.452)		
Total:		67–77 (.465)			
