= Pete Perry (basketball) =

American basketball player, center

Personal information
- Born: March 24, 1948 (age 78) Utica, Mississippi, U.S.
- Listed height: 6 ft 11 in (2.11 m)
- Listed weight: 220 lb (100 kg)

Career information
- College: Hinds CC (1969–1971); UT Rio Grande Valley (1971–1973)
- NBA draft: 1973: 2nd round, 34th overall pick
- Drafted by: Los Angeles Lakers
- Position: Center
- Stats at Basketball Reference

John "Pete" Perry (born March 24, 1948) is an American former basketball player. He played college basketball for the Pan American Broncs.

== College career ==
Perry attended high school in Hinds County, Mississippi. He played his freshman and sophomore seasons of college basketball at Utica Junior College (now Hinds Community College). Perry transferred to Pan American College (now University of Texas Rio Grande Valley) at the end of his sophomore season.

As a junior, Perry set a school single-season record with 96 total blocks. He also established a school single-game record with 8 blocked shots against the Southern Miss Golden Eagles on December 6, 1971, which he later broke with 11 blocks against the Lamar Cardinals on February 21, 1972.

As a senior, Perry played in 26 games, averaging 20.1 points, 14.9 rebounds (seventh in school history), for a single-season total of 388 rebounds (seventh in school history) and a total of 120 blocked shots (school record).

Perry was a prolific shot blocker while playing for the Broncs and set the program record for most career blocks with 216, which is over double that of the second highest player. He also ranks eighth in career rebounds with 670.

== Professional career ==
Perry was selected by the Los Angeles Lakers in the second round (34th overall) of the 1973 NBA draft. He was also selected by the Virginia Squires in the 1973 ABA draft. He signed with the Lakers on July 3, 1973, but did not play for the team.

In September 1974, he signed as a free agent with the New York Knicks. In October, he was released before the start of the season after the re-signing of Tom Riker. Perry never played in the National Basketball Association (NBA).

== Personal life ==
Perry was one of 14 children born to reverend Reverend Charlie Perry and his wife. He had a stutter.

Perry married Jacqui who was a fellow student at Pan American. Their son, Makeba, played college basketball for the Tulane Green Wave.
