= Marshall Rogers (basketball) =

American basketball player

Personal information
- Born: August 27, 1953 St. Louis, Missouri, U.S.
- Died: June 15, 2011 (aged 57) Berkeley, Missouri, U.S.
- Listed height: 6 ft 1 in (1.85 m)
- Listed weight: 190 lb (86 kg)

Career information
- High school: Sumner (St. Louis, Missouri)
- College: Kansas (1972–1973); Texas–Rio Grande Valley (1974–1976)
- NBA draft: 1976: 2nd round, 34th overall pick
- Drafted by: Golden State Warriors
- Playing career: 1976–1977
- Position: Point guard
- Number: 11

Career history
- 1976–1977: Golden State Warriors

Career highlights
- 2× Honorable mention All-American (1975, 1976); NCAA scoring champion (1976)

Career NBA statistics
- Points: 100 (3.8 ppg)
- Rebounds: 11 (0.4 rpg)
- Assists: 10 (0.4 apg)
- Stats at NBA.com
- Stats at Basketball Reference

Marshall Lee Rogers (August 27, 1953 – June 15, 2011) was an American professional basketball player and former NCAA scoring champion with Pan American University.

== Basketball career ==
=== High school ===
Rogers attended Sumner High School in St. Louis, Missouri. He was on the Bulldogs 1969 Missouri Class L state champion basketball team as a reserve. In 1970 and 1971, Rogers led Sumner to consecutive Public High League titles. In his senior year he averaged 26.4 points per game and was named to the all-state team.

In addition to basketball, Rogers was also an accomplished track athlete. He was the 1971 Missouri state champion in the triple jump.

=== College ===
A 6'1" guard from Pan American University and the University of Kansas. While at Kansas Rogers played in 18 games and averaged 7.6 ppg. After not getting along with head coach Ted Owens, Rogers transferred to Pan American University, who had just hired Abe Lemons, where he sat out his sophomore season due to NCAA transfer rules. In the 1974–75 season, Rogers averaged 26.7 points per game as he led the Broncs to a 22–2 record. The following year, Rogers averaged 36.8 ppg and led the nation in scoring.

=== Professional ===
Rogers played one season (1976–1977) in the National Basketball Association as a member of the Golden State Warriors. He averaged 3.8 points in his 26-game NBA career.

== Later life ==
After his basketball career ended, he worked as a substitute teacher in his hometown of St. Louis, Missouri. He then began a lawn care company. In his later years, he suffered from complications related to diabetes. He died at age 57 in June 2011.

== Career statistics ==
Legend
GP	Games played	GS	Games started	MPG	Minutes per game
FG%	Field goal percentage	3P%	3-point field goal percentage	FT%	Free throw percentage
RPG	Rebounds per game	APG	Assists per game	SPG	Steals per game
BPG	Blocks per game	PPG	Points per game	**Bold**	Career high

=== NBA ===
==== Regular season ====
Year	Team	GP	MPG	FG%	FT%	RPG	APG	SPG	BPG	PPG
1976–77	Golden State	26	6.8	.371	.933	.4	.4	.3	.1	3.8
