= 2020 NCAA Division I men's basketball tournament =

Edition of USA college basketball tournament

- Season: 2019–20
- Teams: 68 (planned)
- Finals site: Mercedes-Benz Stadium, Atlanta, Georgia
- Cancelled due to the COVID-19 pandemic

The 2020 NCAA Division I men's basketball tournament was a planned single-elimination tournament of 68 teams to determine the National Collegiate Athletic Association (NCAA) Division I men's college basketball national champion for the 2019–20 season. The 82nd edition of the tournament would have begun on March 17, 2020, and concluded with the championship game on April 6 at Mercedes-Benz Stadium in Atlanta, Georgia.

On March 12, the tournament, as well as all other NCAA championships for the remainder of the academic year, were canceled due to the COVID-19 pandemic in the United States, just five days before it was set to begin. It was the first time the tournament had been canceled since its creation in 1939. Four years later in 2024, Atlanta successfully bid for the right to host the 2031 tournament in lieu of the canceled event.

== COVID-19 impact and cancelation ==
The timing of the tournament coincided with the wider spread of the COVID-19 pandemic in the United States. On March 10, the Ivy League announced it had canceled the conference's tournament, and would award its championship and automatic qualification to Yale based on regular season records. Harvard University was scheduled to host the event at Lavietes Pavilion in Boston on March 14 and 15. Some conferences subsequently announced they would go on with their tournaments while holding their games behind closed doors with no outside spectators and limited attendance, especially on March 11 (when the World Health Organization declared COVID-19 a pandemic).

The NCAA subsequently announced it would go on with its winter-sport championships, including its basketball tournaments, with attendance limited to essential staff and family members. Some venues (such as those in Ohio and California) enacted further local numerical restrictions on the numbers of those who could attend an event, which the NCAA agreed to respect. Reports also stated that for practicality reasons, the NCAA was considering re-locating some of the later rounds (including the regional finals and the Final Four, the latter scheduled to be held at the 71,000-seat Mercedes-Benz Stadium) to smaller venues within the same host cities. Construction of the Final Four tournament in Mercedes-Benz Stadium would have started on March 23.

On March 11, hours after the WHO's pandemic declaration, the NBA suspended its regular season after Utah Jazz player Rudy Gobert was diagnosed with COVID-19. On the same night, Nebraska coach Fred Hoiberg fell visibly ill during a game in the first round of the Big Ten tournament. There were initial fears that Hoiberg had COVID-19, but he was ultimately diagnosed with influenza A. The following day, due in part to Gobert's diagnosis and Hoiberg's health scare, all conferences that had not yet concluded tournament play announced they would be scrapping their tournaments. Many of them had announced they would play without fans, but it was decided to scrap play altogether. With the decision to cancel the 2020 Mid-Eastern Athletic Conference tournament, all games that had yet to be played in the basketball season were cancelled, while the Big East called off its tournament at halftime during a quarter-final game between Creighton and St. John's. Most major conferences also announced suspensions of all athletics to varying degrees. Later in the day, the NCAA announced the tournament would be canceled, along with all remaining winter and spring championships for the academic year.

The NCAA had not ruled out publishing what would have been its at-large selections and bracket. Vice president of men's basketball Dan Gavitt told the Associated Press that he had proposed holding a shortened, 16-team tournament in Atlanta (split between State Farm Arena and Mercedes-Benz Stadium) as an alternative, with all participants chosen by the selection committee, before the decision was made to cancel the entire tournament due to Rudy Gobert's diagnosis. The NCAA ultimately decided against releasing any brackets, with Gavitt stating, "Brackets based on hypotheticals can’t substitute for a complete selection, seeding and bracketing process."

As part of a cycle that began in 2016, TBS was scheduled to televise the 2020 Final Four and national championship game. CBS was scheduled to televise the selection show. CBS Sports and Turner Sports announced on March 16 that all technicians and utility staff who were expected to work the NCAA March Madness coverage would still be paid. Radio rightsholder Westwood One announced plans to offer encores of radio broadcasts from classic NCAA tournament games—accompanied by interviews with notable figures from the respective games—to fill the time slots it had originally devoted to the tournament. CBS similarly announced on March 19 that it would also air nine classic Final Four games across the weekend afternoons of March 21, 22, and 29.

== Originally scheduled dates, venues, and television coverage ==
2020 First Four (orange) and first and second rounds (green)
2020 Regionals (blue) and Final Four (red)

Prior to cancellation, 14 venues had been scheduled to host games in the 2020 tournament:

First Four

- March 17 and 18
  - University of Dayton Arena, Dayton, Ohio (Host: University of Dayton)

First and Second Rounds

- March 19 and 21
  - Times Union Center, Albany, New York (Hosts: Siena College, Metro Atlantic Athletic Conference)
  - Spokane Arena, Spokane, Washington (Host: University of Idaho)
  - Enterprise Center, St. Louis, Missouri (Host: Missouri Valley Conference)
  - Amalie Arena, Tampa, Florida (Host: University of South Florida)
- March 20 and 22
  - Greensboro Coliseum Complex, Greensboro, North Carolina (Host: Atlantic Coast Conference)
  - CHI Health Center Omaha, Omaha, Nebraska (Host: Creighton University)
  - Golden 1 Center, Sacramento, California (Host: Sacramento State University)
  - Rocket Mortgage FieldHouse, Cleveland, Ohio (Hosts: Cleveland State University, Mid-American Conference)

Regional semifinals and finals (Sweet Sixteen and Elite Eight)

- March 26 and 28
  - Midwest Regional, Lucas Oil Stadium, Indianapolis, Indiana (Hosts: IUPUI, Horizon League)
  - West Regional, Staples Center, Los Angeles, California (Host: Pepperdine University)
- March 27 and 29
  - South Regional, Toyota Center, Houston, Texas (Host: University of Houston)
  - East Regional, Madison Square Garden, New York, New York (Hosts: St. John's University, Big East Conference)

National semifinals and championship (Final Four and championship)

- April 4 and 6
  - Mercedes-Benz Stadium, Atlanta, Georgia (Host: Georgia Institute of Technology)

Television channels, studio hosts, studio analysts, and commentary teams
- First Four – TruTV
- First and Second Rounds – CBS, TBS, TNT, and TruTV
- Regional semifinals and final (Sweet Sixteen & Elite Eight) – CBS and TBS
- National semifinals (Final Four) and championship – TBS
Studio hosts
- Greg Gumbel (New York City and Atlanta) – First round, second round, Regionals, Final Four and National Championship Game
- Ernie Johnson (New York City and Atlanta) – First round, second round, Regional Semi-Finals, Final Four and National Championship Game
- Adam Zucker (Atlanta) – First Four, first round and Second Round
- Adam Lefkoe - First round and Second Round (Game Breaks)
Studio analysts
- Charles Barkley (New York City and Atlanta) – First round, second round, Regionals, Final Four and National Championship Game
- Seth Davis (Atlanta) – First Four, first round, second round, Regional Semi-Finals, Final Four and National Championship Game
- Brendan Haywood (Atlanta) – First Four, first round, second round and Regional Semi-Finals
- Clark Kellogg (New York City and Atlanta) – First round, second round, Regionals, Final Four and National Championship Game
- Candace Parker (Atlanta) – First Four, first round, second round and Regional Semi-Finals
- Kenny Smith (New York City and Atlanta) – First round, second round, Regionals, Final Four and National Championship Game
- Gene Steratore (New York City and Atlanta) (Rules Analyst) – First Four, first round, second round, Regionals, Final Four and National Championship Game
- Dwyane Wade (Atlanta) – Final Four and National Championship Game
Commentary teams
- Jim Nantz/Bill Raftery/Grant Hill/Tracy Wolfson – Final Four and National Championship at Atlanta, Georgia
- Brian Anderson/Chris Webber/Allie LaForce
- Ian Eagle/Jim Spanarkel/Jamie Erdahl
- Kevin Harlan/Reggie Miller/Dan Bonner/Dana Jacobson
- Brad Nessler/Jim Jackson/Steve Lavin (First Four only)/Evan Washburn – First Four at Dayton, Ohio (Tuesday)
- Spero Dedes/Steve Smith/Wally Szczerbiak/Lisa Byington
- Andrew Catalon/Steve Lappas/Steve Lavin (First Four only)/Lauren Shehadi or Lisa Byington – First Four at Dayton, Ohio (Wednesday)
- Carter Blackburn/Debbie Antonelli/John Schriffen

== Automatic qualifiers ==
Twelve teams had automatically qualified for the 2020 NCAA field by virtue of winning their conference's tournament.

All conference tournaments that had not been completed were cancelled, the majority without naming an automatic qualifier. Teams with a † next to their names were named automatic qualifiers by their conferences after their tournament was cancelled.

Of the 12 programs that won their conference tournaments in 2020, eight have appeared in subsequent NCAA tournaments as of 2026: Gonzaga (next appeared in 2021), Liberty (2021), Utah State (2021), Winthrop (2021), Northern Kentucky (2023), Robert Morris (2025), Hofstra (2026), and North Dakota State (2026). Four have yet to subsequently appear: Belmont, Boston University, Bradley, and East Tennessee State.

Conference	Team	Record	Appearance	Last bid
Tournament completed
ASUN	Liberty	30–4	5th	2019
Big South	Winthrop	24–10	11th	2017
Colonial	Hofstra	26–8	5th	2001
Horizon	Northern Kentucky	23–9	3rd	2019
Missouri Valley	Bradley	23–11	10th	2019
Mountain West	Utah State	26–8	22nd	2019
NEC	Robert Morris	20–14	9th	2015
Ohio Valley	Belmont	26–7	9th	2019
Patriot League	Boston University	21–13	8th	2011
Southern	East Tennessee State	30–4	11th	2017
Summit League	North Dakota State	25–8	5th	2019
WCC	Gonzaga	31–2	23rd	2019
Cancelled during final round
America East	Vermont †	26–7	8th	2019
Cancelled during semifinals
Ivy League	Yale †	23–7	6th	2019
SWAC	No automatic bid awarded			
Cancelled during quarterfinals
ACC	Florida State †	26–5	18th	2019
Big 12	No automatic bid awarded			
Big East	No automatic bid awarded			
Big Sky	No automatic bid awarded			
Big Ten	No automatic bid awarded			
Big West	No automatic bid awarded			
C-USA	No automatic bid awarded			
MAAC	Siena †	20–10	7th	2010
MAC	Akron †	24–7	5th	2013
MEAC	No automatic bid awarded			
Pac-12	No automatic bid awarded			
Southland	No automatic bid awarded			
Sun Belt	No automatic bid awarded			
WAC	New Mexico State †	25–6	23rd	2019
Cancelled during an earlier round
American	No automatic bid awarded			
Atlantic 10	No automatic bid awarded			
SEC	Kentucky †	25–6	60th	2019

== See also ==
- Impact of the COVID-19 pandemic on sports
- 2004–05 NHL lockout
- 1994 World Series
- 2020 NCAA Division I women's basketball tournament
- 2020 NCAA Division II men's basketball tournament
- 2020 NCAA Division III men's basketball tournament
- 2020 NAIA Division I men's basketball tournament
- 2020 National Invitation Tournament
