= 2025–26 Basketball Champions League regular season =

The 2025–26 Basketball Champions League regular season was played between 7 October and 17 December 2025.

== Format ==
The regular season will be played by 32 teams divided into eight groups of four in which 29 teams receive direct spots plus the three qualifying round tournaments winners. The regular season will begin on 7 October and will conclude on 17 December 2025. In each group, teams will play against each other home-and-away in a round-robin format where the eight group winners from each regular season group will qualify directly to the round of 16. Moreover, the second-placed and third-placed will qualify to the play-ins, where the series winners will qualify for the round of 16, while the remanining last-placed teams will be eliminated after the regular season.

== Draw ==
The draw for the regular season was held on 2 July 2025 at the Olympic Museum in Lausanne, Switzerland.

Pot 1
Team	Pts
(Spanish Basketball Federation) Unicaja	156
(Spanish Basketball Federation) La Laguna Tenerife	142
(Hellenic Basketball Federation) AEK Betsson	103
(Turkish Basketball Federation) Galatasaray	94
(Lithuanian Basketball Federation) Rytas	72
(Spanish Basketball Federation) Joventut Badalona	97.70^{†}
(Spanish Basketball Federation) Dreamland Gran Canaria	97.70^{†}
(German Basketball Federation) Alba Berlin	54.75^{†}

Pot 2
Team	Pts
(Israeli Basketball Association) Hapoel Netanel Holon	68
(Czech Basketball Federation) ERA Nymburk	49
(Hellenic Basketball Federation) Promitheas Vikos Cola	48
(Basketball Belgium) Filou Oostende	48
(Turkish Basketball Federation) Tofaş	37
(Portuguese Basketball Federation) Benfica	34
(Basketball Federation of Bosnia and Herzegovina) Igokea m:tel	31
(Latvian Basketball Association) VEF Rīga	27

Pot 3
Team	Pts
(German Basketball Federation) FIT/One Würzburg	26
(French Federation of Basketball) Cholet	25
(French Federation of Basketball) Le Mans	15
(Israeli Basketball Association) Bnei Penlink Herzliya	11
(Polish Basketball Federation) Legia Warszawa	10
(Azerbaijan Basketball Federation) Sabah	1
(Turkish Basketball Federation) Mersin	65.95^{†}
(Hungarian Basketball Federation) NHSZ-Szolnoki Olajbányász	36.00^{†}

Pot 4
Team	Pts
(Basketball Federation of Serbia) Spartak Office Shoes	1
(Hellenic Basketball Federation) Karditsa Iaponiki	65.00^{†}
(German Basketball Federation) MLP Academics Heidelberg	54.75^{†}
(Italian Basketball Federation) Trapani Shark	43.92^{†}
(Italian Basketball Federation) Pallacanestro Trieste	43.92^{†}
Winner of QRT 1	
Winner of QRT 2	
Winner of QRT 3	

Notes

^† Indicates teams with no club points, therefore using the country points as a tiebreaker.

== Groups ==
=== Group A ===
Pos	Team	Pld	W	L	PF	PA	PD	Pts	Qualification	VIL	HDB	PRO	WAR
1	(Lithuanian Basketball Federation) Rytas	6	4	2	564	534	+30	10	Advance to round of 16	—	116–90	98–79	93–85
2	(German Basketball Federation) MLP Academics Heidelberg	6	3	3	502	507	−5	9	Advance to play-ins	92–83	—	82–62	67–74
3	(Hellenic Basketball Federation) Promitheas Vikos Cola	6	3	3	481	507	−26	9	Advance to play-ins	111–95	89–83	—	72–85
4	(Polish Basketball Federation) Legia Warszawa	6	2	4	468	467	+1	8		77–79	83–88	64–68	—

Source: FIBA
Legend: Blue = home team win; Red = away team win.

7 October 2025	Promitheas Vikos Cola (Hellenic Basketball Federation)	89–83	(German Basketball Federation) MLP Academics Heidelberg	Dimitris Tofalos Arena
19:00 (EEST)	Scoring by quarter: 32–13, 18–24, 24–19, 15–27
	Pts: Gray 20; Rebs: Paulicap 12; Asts: Gray 4	Boxscore	Pts: Horne 22; Rebs: Ma. Weathers 5 Asts: Mi. Weathers 6	Attendance: 943; Referees: Paulo Marques, Marius Ciulin, Ofer Manheim

7 October 2025	Rytas (Lithuanian Basketball Federation)	93–85	(Polish Basketball Federation) Legia Warsaw	Twinsbet Arena
20:00 (EEST)	Scoring by quarter: 29–23, 21–25, 24–22, 19–15
	Pts: Harding 20; Rebs: Wiley 8 Asts: Radzevicius 3	Boxscore	Pts: Graves 23; Rebs: Hunter 10; Asts: Graves 8	Attendance: 4,037; Referees: Petar Pesic, Fernando Calatrava, Elvis Binders-Coders

15 October 2025	MLP Academics Heidelberg (German Basketball Federation)	92–83	(Lithuanian Basketball Federation) Rytas	SNP Dome
18:30 (CEST)	Scoring by quarter: 21–26, 21–21, 28–20, 22–16
	Pts: Horne 33; Rebs: Neskovic 8 Asts: Mi. Weathers 9	Boxscore	Pts: Sargiunas 15; Rebs: Gudaitis 8 Asts: Sargiunas 5	Attendance: 3,221; Referees: Ademir Zurapovic, Valenstin Oliot, Çisil Güngör

15 October 2025	Legia Warsaw (Polish Basketball Federation)	64–68	(Hellenic Basketball Federation) Promitheas Vikos Cola	Arena COS Torwar
20:00 (CEST)	Scoring by quarter: 17–16, 16–16, 16–18, 15–18
	Pts: Graves 14; Rebs: Hunter 9 Asts: Graves 6	Boxscore	Pts: Hammonds 20; Rebs: McCullum 6 Asts: McCullum 9	Attendance: 4,600; Referees: Luis Castillo, Yann Vezo Davidson, Mehmet Sahin

22 October 2025	MLP Academics Heidelberg (German Basketball Federation)	67–74	(Polish Basketball Federation) Legia Warsaw	SNP Dome
18:30 (CEST)	Scoring by quarter: 13–21, 15–18, 23–24, 16–11
	Pts: Mi. Weathers 17; Rebs: Ma. Weathers 10; Asts: Mi. Weathers 4	Boxscore	Pts: Graves 19; Rebs: Tass 9 Asts: Pluta Jr. 5	Attendance: 3,329; Referees: Antonio Conde, Martin Horozov, Josip Jurcevic

22 October 2025	Rytas (Lithuanian Basketball Federation)	98–79	(Hellenic Basketball Federation) Promitheas Vikos Cola	Twinsbet Arena
19:30 (EEST)	Scoring by quarter: 29–19, 24–20, 24–18, 21–22
	Pts: Gudaitis 19; Rebs: Masiulis 11; Asts: Walker 6	Boxscore	Pts: Coleman 18; Rebs: Coleman 6 Asts: McCullum 4	Attendance: 4,199; Referees: Yohan Rosso, Julio Anaya, Lorenzo Baldini

5 November 2025	Rytas (Lithuanian Basketball Federation)	116–90	(German Basketball Federation) MLP Academics Heidelberg	Twinsbet Arena
19:30 (EET)	Scoring by quarter: 31–23, 28–22, 33–21, 24–24
	Pts: Harding 30; Rebs: Radzevicius 9 Asts: Walker 7	Boxscore	Pts: Mi. Weathers 23; Rebs: Ma. Weathers 7 Asts: McClain 5	Attendance: 4,011; Referees: Luis Castillo, Mihkel Männiste, Calentin Oliot

5 November 2025	Promitheas Vikos Cola (Hellenic Basketball Federation)	72–85	(Polish Basketball Federation) Legia Warsaw	Dimitris Tofalos Arena
20:00 (EET)	Scoring by quarter: 15–28, 17–24, 15–14, 25–19
	Pts: Bazinas 23; Rebs: Karagiannidis 6 Asts: Gray 3	Boxscore	Pts: Pluta 17; Rebs: Hunter 9 Asts: Pluta 6	Referees: Ademir Zurapovic, Ariadna Chueca, Geert Jacobs

18 November 2025	Legia Warsaw (Polish Basketball Federation)	77–79	(Lithuanian Basketball Federation) Rytas	Arena COS Torwar
18:00 (CET)	Scoring by quarter: 25–22, 17–20, 16–17, 19–20
	Pts: Pluta 23; Rebs: Graves 8 Asts: Pluta 8	Boxscore	Pts: Harding 22; Rebs: Radzevicius 9 Asts: Radzevicius 3	Attendance: 4,600

18 November 2025	MLP Academics Heidelberg (German Basketball Federation)	82–62	(Hellenic Basketball Federation) Promitheas Vikos Cola	SNP Dome
18:30 (CET)	Scoring by quarter: 21–17, 17–20, 23–15, 21–10
	Pts: Keßen 17; Rebs: Keßen 8 Asts: McClain 8	Boxscore	Pts: Harris Jr. 21; Rebs: Karagiannidis 5 Asts: Bazinas, Karagiannidis, Macura 2	Attendance: 3,729

17 December 2025	Promitheas Vikos Cola (Hellenic Basketball Federation)	111–95	(Lithuanian Basketball Federation) Rytas	Dimitris Tofalos Arena
19:00 (EET)	Scoring by quarter: 18–32, 34–22, 35–22, 24–19
	Pts: Gray 30; Rebs: Karagiannidis 11; Asts: Harris Jr. 7	Boxscore	Pts: Sargiūnas 24; Rebs: Gudaitis 15; Asts: Walker 7	Attendance: 1,093; Referees: Ariadna Chueca, Ventsislav Velikov, Mehmet Şahin

17 December 2025	Legia Warsaw (Polish Basketball Federation)	83–88(OT)	(German Basketball Federation) MLP Academics Heidelberg	Arena COS Torwar
18:00 (CET)	Scoring by quarter: 21–10, 27–17, 8–27, 13–15, Overtime: 9–9, 5–10
	Pts: Graves 19; Rebs: Hunter 9 Asts: Pluta Jr. 9	Boxscore	Pts: Weathers 22; Rebs: Osunniyi, Williamson 10; Asts: Weathers 6	Attendance: 3,700; Referees: Ademir Zurapović, Lorenzo Baldini, Paulo Marques

=== Group B ===
Pos	Team	Pld	W	L	PF	PA	PD	Pts	Qualification	ALB	CHA	NYM	SAB
1	(German Basketball Federation) Alba Berlin	6	5	1	549	483	+66	11	Advance to round of 16	—	76–81	94–78	106–82
2	(French Federation of Basketball) Élan Chalon	6	5	1	539	513	+26	11	Advance to play-ins	91–100	—	97–84	84–71
3	(Czech Basketball Federation) ERA Nymburk	6	1	5	512	546	−34	7	Advance to play-ins	75–88	95–97	—	93–65
4	(Azerbaijan Basketball Federation) Sabah	6	1	5	486	544	−58	7		76–85	87–89	105–87	—

Source: FIBA
Legend: Blue = home team win; Red = away team win.

7 October 2025	ERA Nyumburk (Czech Basketball Federation)	93–65	(Azerbaijan Basketball Federation) Sabah	Královka Arena
18:30 (CEST)	Scoring by quarter: 25–23, 20–11, 22–13, 26–18
	Pts: Rice 22; Rebs: Santos-Silva 11; Asts: Brickus 5	Boxscore	Pts: Gravett 14; Rebs: Pansa 10; Asts: Gravett 7	Attendance: 1,920; Referees: Martin Horozov, Sinisa Prpa, Blaz Zupancic

8 October 2025	Alba Berlin (German Basketball Federation)	76–81	(French Federation of Basketball) Élan Chalon	Uber Arena
20:00 (CEST)	Scoring by quarter: 22–20, 21–15, 15–25, 18–21
	Pts: Ellis 27; Rebs: Ellis 7 Asts: Hermannsson 5	Boxscore	Pts: Hill 15; Rebs: Gaudoux 11; Asts: Nadolny 5	Attendance: 7,533; Referees: Martin Vulic, Yener Yilmaz, Ioannis Agrafiotis

14 October 2025	ERA Nyumburk (Czech Basketball Federation)	95–972OT	(French Federation of Basketball) Élan Chalon	Královka Arena
18:30 (CEST)	Scoring by quarter: 26–22, 22–20, 13–22, 18–15, Overtime: 7–7, 9–11
	Pts: Rice 24; Rebs: Santos-Silva 19; Asts: Sehnal 7	Boxscore	Pts: Cuthbertson 20; Rebs: Gaudoux 10; Asts: Nadolny 5	Attendance: 1,686; Referees: Boris Krejic, Georgios Poursanidis, Ioannis Tsibouris

15 October 2025	Sabah (Azerbaijan Basketball Federation)	76–85	(German Basketball Federation) Alba Berlin	National Gymnastics Arena
20:00 (AZT)	Scoring by quarter: 16–16, 13–20, 21–24, 26–25
	Pts: Tillman 22; Rebs: Tillman 9 Asts: Gravett 11	Boxscore	Pts: Ellis 17; Rebs: Roberts 14; Asts: Hermannsson 9	Attendance: 4,050; Referees: Martins Kozlovskis, Josip Jurcevic, Juozas Barkauskas

28 October 2025	Alba Berlin (German Basketball Federation)	94–78	(Czech Basketball Federation) ERA Nyumburk	Uber Arena
20:00 (CET)	Scoring by quarter: 19–22, 24–16, 26–23, 25–17
	Pts: Griesel 18; Rebs: Roberts 5 Asts: Roberts 5	Boxscore	Pts: Rice 20; Rebs: Feazell 4 Asts: Rice 4	Attendance: 6,981; Referees: Antonio Conde, Martins Kozlovskis, Lorenzo Baldini

29 October 2025	Élan Chalon (French Federation of Basketball)	84–71	(Azerbaijan Basketball Federation) Sabah	Le Colisée
20:00 (CET)	Scoring by quarter: 24–18, 30–17, 8–23, 22–13
	Pts: Hill 14; Rebs: Hill 12; Asts: Gaudoux 5	Boxscore	Pts: Pansa 19; Rebs: Čavars 7 Asts: Čavars 6	Attendance: 4,425; Referees: Adriadna Chueca, Gatis Salins, Alberto Sanchez

12 November 2025	Sabah (Azerbaijan Basketball Federation)	87–89	(French Federation of Basketball) Élan Chalon	National Gymnastics Arena
20:00 (AZT)	Scoring by quarter: 20–21, 31–17, 26–31, 10–20
	Pts: Jordan 28; Rebs: Čavars 8 Asts: Gravett 8	Boxscore	Pts: Tucker 23; Rebs: Gaudoux 12; Asts: Hill 6

12 November 2025	ERA Nyumburk (Czech Basketball Federation)	75–88	(German Basketball Federation) Alba Berlin	Královka Arena
18:30 (CET)	Scoring by quarter: 19–20, 16–21, 15–20, 25–27
	Pts: Rice 28; Rebs: Feazell, Shumate 5 Asts: Sehnal 7	Boxscore	Pts: Agbakoko 13; Rebs: Bean 5 Asts: Hermannsson 8	Attendance: 2,286

9 December 2025	Sabah (Azerbaijan Basketball Federation)	105–87	(Czech Basketball Federation) ERA Nyumburk	National Gymnastics Arena
20:00 (AZT)	Scoring by quarter: 30–21, 20–20, 22–21, 35–26
	Pts: Jordan 23; Rebs: Pansa, Tillman 9 Asts: Blakes 6	Boxscore	Pts: Rice 24; Rebs: Dreamer, Feazell, Rice 3 Asts: Sehnal 5	Referees: Ariadna Chueca, Lorenzo Baldini, Josip Jurčević

9 December 2025	Élan Chalon (French Federation of Basketball)	91–100	(German Basketball Federation) Alba Berlin	Le Colisée
19:30 (CET)	Scoring by quarter: 24–25, 25–22, 18–24, 24–29
	Pts: Hill 26; Rebs: Mutts 8 Asts: Leray 8	Boxscore	Pts: Delow 18; Rebs: Delow 9 Asts: Kayil 9	Attendance: 4,350; Referees: Mārtiņš Kozlovskis, Luis Castillo, Georgios Poursanidis

16 December 2025	Élan Chalon (French Federation of Basketball)	97–84	(Czech Basketball Federation) ERA Nyumburk	Le Colisée
19:00 (CET)	Scoring by quarter: 36–18, 24–16, 18–31, 19–19
	Pts: Hill 20; Rebs: Gaudoux, Hill 6 Asts: Hill 6	Boxscore	Pts: Rice 20; Rebs: Feazell 8 Asts: Sehnal 12	Attendance: 4,050; Referees: Antonio Conde, Elvis Binders-Čoders, Alberto Sánchez

16 December 2025	Alba Berlin (German Basketball Federation)	106–82	(Azerbaijan Basketball Federation) Sabah	Uber Arena
19:00 (CET)	Scoring by quarter: 25–24, 17–22, 33–12, 31–24
	Pts: Wood 17; Rebs: Delow, O'Connell, Roberts 5 Asts: Hundt 11	Boxscore	Pts: Blakes 20; Rebs: Jordan 7 Asts: Gravett 9	Attendance: 9,165; Referees: Petar Pešić, Valentin Oliot, Viola Györgyi

=== Group C ===
Pos	Team	Pld	W	L	PF	PA	PD	Pts	Qualification	CJB	CHO	HOL	BUR
1	(Spanish Basketball Federation) Joventut Badalona	6	6	0	531	455	+76	12	Advance to round of 16	—	91–73	97–95	94–67
2	(French Federation of Basketball) Cholet	6	3	3	539	524	+15	9	Advance to play-ins	87–89	—	92–103	109–77
3	(Israeli Basketball Association) Hapoel Netanel Holon	6	3	3	531	521	+10	9	Advance to play-ins	65–81	92–94	—	84–74
4	(Turkish Basketball Federation) Bursaspor	6	0	6	441	542	−101	6		68–79	72–84	83–92	—

Source: FIBA
Legend: Blue = home team win; Red = away team win.

7 October 2025	Joventut Badalona (Spanish Basketball Federation)	91–73	(French Federation of Basketball) Cholet	Pavelló Olímpic de Badalona
20:30 (CEST)	Scoring by quarter: 29–17, 24–18, 21–20, 17–18
	Pts: Tomić 14; Rebs: Dekker 7 Asts: Rubio 6	Boxscore	Pts: Ayayi 14; Rebs: Diarra 8 Asts: De Sousa 5	Attendance: 3,765; Referees: Wojciech Liszka, Juozas Barkauskas, Dariusz Zapolski

8 October 2025	Hapoel Netanel Holon (Israeli Basketball Association)	84–74	(Turkish Basketball Federation) Bursaspor	Arena Savaria
17:00 (CEST)	Scoring by quarter: 16–16, 17–26, 29–17, 22–15
	Pts: Munford 26; Rebs: Munford 8 Asts: Walton 11	Boxscore	Pts: Nnoko 16; Rebs: Nnoko 7 Asts: Childress 5	Referees: Gvidas Gedvilas, Gintaras Maciulis, Zdenko Tomasovic

14 October 2025	Hapoel Netanel Holon (Israeli Basketball Association)	65–81	(Spanish Basketball Federation) Joventut Badalona	Arena Savaria
18:30 (CEST)	Scoring by quarter: 19–24, 14–16, 22–22, 10–19
	Pts: Walton 14; Rebs: Walton 5 Asts: Walton 4	Boxscore	Pts: Drell 14; Rebs: Kraag 9 Asts: Tomić 5	Referees: Julio Anaya, Ventsislav Velikov, Valerio Grigioni

14 October 2025	Bursaspor (Turkish Basketball Federation)	72–84	(French Federation of Basketball) Cholet	Tofaş Nilüfer Spor Salonu
19:30 (EEST)	Scoring by quarter: 23–20, 14–18, 17–22, 18–24
	Pts: Crawford 19; Rebs: Nnoko 13; Asts: Childress 4	Boxscore	Pts: Agbo 16; Rebs: Diarra 7 Asts: Campbell 8	Attendance: 4,271; Referees: Peter Praksch, Mihkel Männiste, Ritvars Helmsteins

22 October 2025	Cholet (French Federation of Basketball)	92–103	(Israeli Basketball Association) Hapoel Netanel Holon	La Meilleraie
20:00 (CEST)	Scoring by quarter: 27–25, 21–25, 22–28, 22–25
	Pts: Kountz 15; Rebs: McNeace 6 Asts: Ayayi 8	Boxscore	Pts: McRae 24; Rebs: Zalmanson 7 Asts: Zalmanson 6	Attendance: 4,621; Referees: Gatis Salins, Petar Pesic, Georgios Poursanidis

22 October 2025	Joventut Badalona (Spanish Basketball Federation)	94–67	(Turkish Basketball Federation) Bursaspor	Pavelló Olímpic de Badalona
20:45 (CEST)	Scoring by quarter: 27–8, 13–21, 31–25, 23–13
	Pts: Hunt 14; Rebs: Kraag 6 Asts: Hakanson 7	Boxscore	Pts: Konontšuk 15; Rebs: DeLaurier 6 Asts: Crawford 7	Attendance: 3,612; Referees: Boris Krejic, Michal Proc, Paulo Marques

4 November 2025	Hapoel Netanel Holon (Israeli Basketball Association)	92–94(OT)	(French Federation of Basketball) Cholet	Arena Savaria
18:00 (CET)	Scoring by quarter: 15–22, 19–25, 26–24, 24–13, Overtime: 8–10
	Pts: McRae 37; Rebs: Martin 8 Asts: Walton 8	Boxscore	Pts: Ayayi 19; Rebs: Diarra 8 Asts: De Sousa 5	Referees: Boris Krejic, Martin Vulic, Michal Proc

5 November 2025	Bursaspor (Turkish Basketball Federation)	68–79	(Spanish Basketball Federation) Joventut Badalona	Tofaş Nilüfer Spor Salonu
20:30 (TRT)	Scoring by quarter: 16–20, 20–22, 15–10, 17–27
	Pts: Childress 14; Rebs: Childress 7 Asts: Childress 11	Boxscore	Pts: Rubio 24; Rebs: Kraag 7 Asts: Rubio 5	Attendance: 3,701; Referees: Wojciech Liszka, Gatis Salins, Andris Aunkrogers

19 November 2025	Cholet (French Federation of Basketball)	109–77	(Turkish Basketball Federation) Bursaspor	La Meilleraie
20:00 (CET)	Scoring by quarter: 34–20, 30–20, 22–26, 23–11
	Pts: Kountz 17; Rebs: Diarra 8 Asts: Campbell 8	Boxscore	Pts: King 20; Rebs: King 7 Asts: Childress 6	Attendance: 3,939

19 November 2025	Joventut Badalona (Spanish Basketball Federation)	97–95(OT)	(Israeli Basketball Association) Hapoel Netanel Holon	Pavelló Olímpic de Badalona
20:45 (CET)	Scoring by quarter: 19–17, 24–29, 24–16, 14–19, Overtime: 16–14
	Pts: Hunt 20; Rebs: Tomić 10; Asts: Rubio 6	Boxscore	Pts: Walton Jr. 24; Rebs: Rosser 7 Asts: Zalmanson 4

17 December 2025	Cholet (French Federation of Basketball)	87–89	(Spanish Basketball Federation) Joventut Badalona	La Meilleraie
20:00 (CET)	Scoring by quarter: 14–28, 28–16, 22–20, 23–25
	Pts: Gholston 17; Rebs: Diawara 7 Asts: Campbell 10	Boxscore	Pts: Håkanson 17; Rebs: Kraag, Ružić 7 Asts: Vives 7	Attendance: 4,557; Referees: Gvidas Gedvilas, Ritvars Helmsteins, Ioannis Tsibouris

17 December 2025	Bursaspor (Turkish Basketball Federation)	83–92	(Israeli Basketball Association) Hapoel Netanel Holon	Tofaş Nilüfer Spor Salonu
15:00 (TRT)	Scoring by quarter: 27–32, 26–21, 14–22, 16–17
	Pts: Crawford, Parsons 17; Rebs: DeLaurier 7 Asts: Childress, Crawford 4	Boxscore	Pts: Zalmanson 23; Rebs: Brooks, Walton 6 Asts: Walton 9	Referees: Gatis Saliņš, Josip Jurčević, Dariusz Zapolski

=== Group D ===
Pos	Team	Pld	W	L	PF	PA	PD	Pts	Qualification	LLT	TOF	TPS	HER
1	(Spanish Basketball Federation) La Laguna Tenerife	6	4	2	519	474	+45	10	Advance to round of 16	—	80–70	80–83	108–85
2	(Turkish Basketball Federation) Tofaş	6	3	3	495	511	−16	9	Advance to play-ins	64–81	—	99–93	90–86
3	(Italian Basketball Federation) Trapani Shark	6	3	3	521	516	+5	9	Advance to play-ins	78–84	89–91	—	101–88
4	(Israeli Basketball Association) Bnei Penlink Herzliya	6	2	4	509	543	−34	8		94–86	82–81	74–77	—

Source: FIBA
Legend: Blue = home team win; Red = away team win.

8 October 2025	Tofaş (Turkish Basketball Federation)	90–86	(Israeli Basketball Association) Bnei Penlink Herzliya	Arena SamElyon
20:00 (EEST)	Scoring by quarter: 24–22, 25–27, 14–26, 27–11
	Pts: Blaževič 25; Rebs: Blaževič 12; Asts: Geçim 13	Boxscore	Pts: Stewart 23; Rebs: Varnado 6 Asts: Heidegger 10	Referees: Ademir Zurapovic, Ventsislav Velikov, Ioannis Tsibouris

8 October 2025	Trapani Shark (Italian Basketball Federation)	78–84	(Spanish Basketball Federation) La Laguna Tenerife	Pala Shark
20:30 (CEST)	Scoring by quarter: 12–21, 26–20, 20–24, 20–19
	Pts: Ford 16; Rebs: Rossato 5 Asts: Ford 5	Boxscore	Pts: Doornekamp 13; Rebs: Doornekamp 3 Asts: Fitipaldo 6	Referees: Boris Krejic, Georgios Poursanidis, Valentin Oliot

14 October 2025	Trapani Shark (Italian Basketball Federation)	89–91	(Turkish Basketball Federation) Tofaş	Pala Shark
20:30 (CEST)	Scoring by quarter: 17–26, 19–27, 28–19, 25–19
	Pts: Allen 15; Rebs: Eboua 8 Asts: Ford 5	Boxscore	Pts: Blaževič 23; Rebs: Blaževič 6 Asts: Perez 9	Referees: Paulo Marques, Michal Proc, Carsten Straube

14 October 2025	La Laguna Tenerife (Spanish Basketball Federation)	108–85	(Israeli Basketball Association) Bnei Penlink Herzliya	Santiago Martin Arena
20:00 (WEST)	Scoring by quarter: 29–15, 31–24, 25–20, 23–26
	Pts: Fernández 25; Rebs: Abromaitis 8 Asts: Huertas 5	Boxscore	Pts: Stewart 19; Rebs: Onuaku 5 Asts: Dawson 5	Referees: Gvidas Gedvilas, Ivor Matejek, Elvis Binders-Coders

28 October 2025	Bnei Penlink Herzliya (Israeli Basketball Association)	74–77	(Italian Basketball Federation) Trapani Shark	Víceúčelová Hala Opava
17:30 (CET)	Scoring by quarter: 20–19, 17–23, 16–19, 21–16
	Pts: Onuaku 21; Rebs: Stewart 8 Asts: Stewart 6	Boxscore	Pts: Hurt 14; Rebs: Eboua 9 Asts: Cappelletti 3	Attendance: 455; Referees: Yohan Rosso, Yahn Vezo Davidson, Mihkel Männiste

28 October 2025	Tofaş (Turkish Basketball Federation)	64–81	(Spanish Basketball Federation) La Laguna Tenerife	Tofaş Spor Salonu
20:00 (EEST)	Scoring by quarter: 12–20, 16–20, 23–16, 13–25
	Pts: Blaževič 12; Rebs: Blaževič 5 Asts: Geçim 6	Boxscore	Pts: Fitipaldo 15; Rebs: Shermadini 11; Asts: Huertas 5	Attendance: 3,100; Referees: Wojciech Liszka, Julio Anaya, Ventsislav Velikov

11 November 2025	Trapani Shark (Italian Basketball Federation)	101–88	(Israeli Basketball Association) Bnei Penlink Herzliya	Pala Shark
20:30 (CET)	Scoring by quarter: 22–30, 24–21, 27–21, 28–16
	Pts: Allen 24; Rebs: Eboua 7 Asts: Notae 5	Boxscore	Pts: Stewart 20; Rebs: Onuaku 10; Asts: Douglas 6	Attendance: 3,365

11 November 2025	La Laguna Tenerife (Spanish Basketball Federation)	80–70	(Turkish Basketball Federation) Tofaş	Santiago Martin Arena
20:00 (WET)	Scoring by quarter: 18–22, 21–16, 20–10, 21–22
	Pts: Fitipaldo, Giedraitis 17; Rebs: Guerrera, Shermadini, Scrubb 4 Asts: Huertas 7	Boxscore	Pts: Besson 17; Rebs: Saybir 8 Asts: Gecim 4	Attendance: 3,541

9 December 2025	Bnei Penlink Herzliya (Israeli Basketball Association)	82–81	(Turkish Basketball Federation) Tofaş	Víceúčelová Hala Opava
18:00 (CET)	Scoring by quarter: 18–20, 24–22, 18–23, 22–16
	Pts: Stewart 19; Rebs: Carter 9 Asts: Francis, Stewart 4	Boxscore	Pts: Saybir 28; Rebs: Saybir 8 Asts: Pérez 11	Attendance: 285; Referees: Gvidas Gedvilas, Péter Praksch, Valentin Oliot

10 December 2025	La Laguna Tenerife (Spanish Basketball Federation)	80–83	(Italian Basketball Federation) Trapani Shark	Santiago Martin Arena
20:00 (WET)	Scoring by quarter: 20–22, 19–24, 17–21, 24–16
	Pts: Fernández 16; Rebs: Shermadini 9 Asts: Fitipaldo 9	Boxscore	Pts: Notae 24; Rebs: Arcidiacono, Eboua, Ford, Sanogo 4 Asts: Ford, Rossato 3	Attendance: 2,717; Referees: Gatis Salins, Julio Anaya, Paulo Marques

16 December 2025	Tofaş (Turkish Basketball Federation)	99–93(OT)	(Italian Basketball Federation) Trapani Shark	Tofaş Spor Salonu
20:30 (TRT)	Scoring by quarter: 18–28, 24–18, 20–19, 22–19, Overtime: 15–9
	Pts: Pérez 22; Rebs: Pérez 9 Asts: Pérez 13	Boxscore	Pts: Notae 27; Rebs: Eboua, Notae, Hurt 7 Asts: Cappelletti 13	Attendance: 2,261; Referees: Andris Aunkrogers, Georgios Poursanidis, Carsten Straube

16 December 2025	Bnei Penlink Herzliya (Israeli Basketball Association)	94–86	(Spanish Basketball Federation) La Laguna Tenerife	Víceúčelová Hala Opava
18:30 (CET)	Scoring by quarter: 25–19, 24–29, 19–21, 26–17
	Pts: Onuaku 22; Rebs: Onuaku 9 Asts: Dawson 6	Boxscore	Pts: Van Beck 19; Rebs: Van Beck 5 Asts: Bordón, Van Beck (6)	Attendance: 620; Referees: Yohan Rosso, Geert Jacobs, Juozas Barkauskas

=== Group E ===
Pos	Team	Pld	W	L	PF	PA	PD	Pts	Qualification	GSM	WUE	TS	IGO
1	(Turkish Basketball Federation) Galatasaray MCT Technic	6	5	1	534	474	+60	11	Advance to round of 16	—	89–83	79–80	94–82
2	(German Basketball Federation) Fitness First Würzburg Baskets	6	4	2	480	452	+28	10	Advance to play-ins	74–99	—	78–63	70–68
3	(Italian Basketball Federation) Pallacanestro Trieste	6	2	4	501	519	−18	8	Advance to play-ins	90–91	77–90	—	115–90
4	(Basketball Federation of Bosnia and Herzegovina) Igokea m:tel	6	1	5	452	522	−70	7		65–82	56–85	91–76	—

Source: FIBA
Legend: Blue = home team win; Red = away team win.

7 October 2025	Fitness First Würzburg Baskets (German Basketball Federation)	78–63	(Italian Basketball Federation) Pallacanestro Trieste	Tectake Arena
18:30 (CEST)	Scoring by quarter: 21–12, 16–24, 20–16, 21–11
	Pts: Mintz 24; Rebs: Muenkat 7 Asts: Carr 6	Boxscore	Pts: Ramsey 18; Rebs: Sissoko 6 Asts: Ruzzier 4	Attendance: 2,100; Referees: Ariadna Chueca, Geert Jacobs, Ilias Kounelles

7 October 2025	Galatasaray MCT Technic (Turkish Basketball Federation)	94–82	(Basketball Federation of Bosnia and Herzegovina) Igokea m:tel	Basketball Development Center
20:00 (EEST)	Scoring by quarter: 21–18, 22–27, 29–10, 22–27
	Pts: White Jr. 26; Rebs: White Jr. 6 Asts: Cummings 5	Boxscore	Pts: Tyree 23; Rebs: Gavrilović 7 Asts: Tyree 8	Attendance: 1,805; Referees: Antonio Conde, Andris Aunkrogers, Alberto Sanchez

14 October 2025	Fitness First Würzburg Baskets (German Basketball Federation)	70–68	(Basketball Federation of Bosnia and Herzegovina) Igokea m:tel	Tectake Arena
18:30 (CEST)	Scoring by quarter: 21–19, 17–15, 16–18, 16–16
	Pts: Stove 13; Rebs: Edigin 7 Asts: Mintz 5	Boxscore	Pts: Caesar 15; Rebs: Bess 7 Asts: Lewis 6	Attendance: 2,617; Referees: Wojciech Liszka, Gintaras Maciulis, Edgard Ceccarelli

15 October 2025	Pallacanestro Trieste (Italian Basketball Federation)	90–91	(Turkish Basketball Federation) Galatasaray MCT Technic	PalaTrieste
21:00 (CEST)	Scoring by quarter: 17–21, 21–28, 29–21, 23–21
	Pts: Sissoko 18; Rebs: Sissoko 12; Asts: Toscano-Anderson 4	Boxscore	Pts: Cummings 25; Rebs: White Jr. 9 Asts: Palmer Jr. 7	Attendance: 5,018; Referees: Yohan Rosso, Fernando Calatrava, Blaz Zupancic

21 October 2025	Igokea m:tel (Basketball Federation of Bosnia and Herzegovina)	91–76	(Italian Basketball Federation) Pallacanestro Trieste	Laktaši Sports Hall
18:00 (CEST)	Scoring by quarter: 27–12, 28–27, 15–14, 21–23
	Pts: Tyree 27; Rebs: Milosavljevic 7 Asts: Tyree 6	Boxscore	Pts: Sissoko 17; Rebs: Sissoko 9 Asts: Brown 6	Attendance: 600; Referees: Martins Kozlovskis, Peter Praksch, Mihkel Männiste

21 October 2025	Galatasaray MCT Technic (Turkish Basketball Federation)	89–83	(German Basketball Federation) Fitness First Würzburg Baskets	Basketball Development Center
20:00 (EEST)	Scoring by quarter: 24–16, 20–24, 25–24, 20–19
	Pts: Palmer Jr. 24; Rebs: White Jr. 7 Asts: Cummings 6	Boxscore	Pts: Carr 20; Rebs: Thompson 8 Asts: Carr 3	Attendance: 1,579; Referees: Luis Castillo, Martin Vulic, Ventsislav Velikov

4 November 2025	Fitness First Würzburg Baskets (German Basketball Federation)	74–99	(Turkish Basketball Federation) Galatasaray MCT Technic	Tectake Arena
18:30 (CET)	Scoring by quarter: 15–23, 25–26, 13–27, 21–23
	Pts: Muenkat 19; Rebs: Muenkat 8 Asts: Carr 7	Boxscore	Pts: Cummings 19; Rebs: Palmer Jr. 8 Asts: Palmer Jr. 8	Attendance: 3,140; Referees: Antonio Conde, Martin Horozov, Georgios Poursanidis

4 November 2025	Pallacanestro Trieste (Italian Basketball Federation)	115–90	(Basketball Federation of Bosnia and Herzegovina) Igokea m:tel	PalaTrieste
20:30 (CET)	Scoring by quarter: 23–16, 33–28, 21–18, 38–28
	Pts: Ramsey 26; Rebs: Sissoko 11; Asts: Ross 6	Boxscore	Pts: Milosavljevic 17; Rebs: Milosavljevic 6 Asts: Lewis 8	Attendance: 4,854; Referees: Yohan Rosso, Gvidas Gedvilas, Paulo Marques

18 November 2025	Galatasaray MCT Technic (Turkish Basketball Federation)	79–80	(Italian Basketball Federation) Pallacanestro Trieste	Basketball Development Center
20:00 (TRT)	Scoring by quarter: 18–18, 21–21, 22–18, 18–23
	Pts: McCollum 26; Rebs: Bishop, White Jr. 7 Asts: Korkmaz, Robinson Jr. 3	Boxscore	Pts: Sissoko 21; Rebs: Sissoko 10; Asts: Ruzzier 7	Attendance: 1,280

19 November 2025	Igokea m:tel (Basketball Federation of Bosnia and Herzegovina)	56–85	(German Basketball Federation) Fitness First Würzburg Baskets	Laktaši Sports Hall
18:00 (CET)	Scoring by quarter: 17–25, 12–21, 9–18, 18–21
	Pts: Bess 15; Rebs: Bess, N. Popović 5 Asts: Milosavljević, P. Popović 3	Boxscore	Pts: Carr 19; Rebs: Muenkat 7 Asts: Carr 10	Attendance: 1,450

17 December 2025	Igokea m:tel (Basketball Federation of Bosnia and Herzegovina)	65–82	(Turkish Basketball Federation) Galatasaray MCT Technic	Laktaši Sports Hall
18:30 (CET)	Scoring by quarter: 11–22, 22–19, 14–20, 18–21
	Pts: Bess, Jeremić 14; Rebs: Bess 7 Asts: Popović 6	Boxscore	Pts: Tuncer 16; Rebs: Gillespie 9 Asts: Tuncer 5	Attendance: 650; Referees: Júlio Anaya, Edgard Ceccarelli, Zdenko Tomasovic

17 December 2025	Pallacanestro Trieste (Italian Basketball Federation)	77–90	(German Basketball Federation) Fitness First Würzburg Baskets	PalaTrieste
18:30 (CET)	Scoring by quarter: 16–24, 21–17, 12–27, 28–22
	Pts: Ross 17; Rebs: Brooks 8 Asts: Ross 5	Boxscore	Pts: Ivey 16; Rebs: Muenkat, Thompson 7 Asts: Carr 7	Attendance: 4,732; Referees: Martin Vulić, Ilias Kounellis, Blaž Zupančič

=== Group F ===
Pos	Team	Pld	W	L	PF	PA	PD	Pts	Qualification	AEK	OLA	PAT	VEF
1	(Hellenic Basketball Federation) AEK Betsson	6	5	1	494	431	+63	11	Advance to round of 16	—	91–77	99–88	95–64
2	(Hungarian Basketball Federation) NHSZ-Szolnoki Olajbányász	6	3	3	451	439	+12	9	Advance to play-ins	80–69	—	84–54	77–76
3	(Slovak Basketball Association) Patrioti Levice	6	3	3	461	467	−6	9	Advance to play-ins	69–71	73–71	—	85–69
4	(Latvian Basketball Association) VEF Rīga	6	1	5	411	480	−69	7		53–69	76–62	73–92	—

Source: FIBA
Legend: Blue = home team win; Red = away team win.

7 October 2025	VEF Rīga (Latvian Basketball Association)	53–69	(Hellenic Basketball Federation) AEK Betsson	Xiaomi Arena
21:00 (EEST)	Scoring by quarter: 12–26, 12–15, 16–16, 13–12
	Pts: Porter 16; Rebs: Toro 8 Asts: Porter 3	Boxscore	Pts: Katsivelis 13; Rebs: Katsivelis 6 Asts: Gray 8	Attendance: 3,494; Referees: Yohan Rosso, Michal Proc, Zafer Yilmaz

8 October 2025	NHSZ-Szolnoki Olajbányász (Hungarian Basketball Federation)	84–54	(Slovak Basketball Association) Patrioti Levice	DVTK Aréna
18:00 (CEST)	Scoring by quarter: 18–14, 28–15, 22–14, 16–11
	Pts: Holt 19; Rebs: Skeens 19; Asts: Somogyi 6	Boxscore	Pts: Kivimäki 14; Rebs: Carius 7 Asts: Musić 4	Referees: Luis Catillo, Josip Jurcevic, Tolga Edis

14 October 2025	VEF Rīga (Latvian Basketball Association)	73–92	(Slovak Basketball Association) Patrioti Levice	Xiaomi Arena
19:00 (EEST)	Scoring by quarter: 25–25, 16–15, 14–27, 18–25
	Pts: Porter 20; Rebs: Toro 11; Asts: Toro 4	Boxscore	Pts: McGill 22; Rebs: Dorsey 8 Asts: McGill 10	Attendance: 3,243; Referees: Ariadna Chueca, Dariusz Zapolski, Alberto Sanchez

15 October 2025	AEK Betsson (Hellenic Basketball Federation)	91–77	(Hungarian Basketball Federation) NHSZ-Szolnoki Olajbányász	SUNEL Arena
19:30 (EEST)	Scoring by quarter: 22–10, 23–23, 22–23, 24–21
	Pts: Silva 19; Rebs: Gray 10; Asts: Bartley 4	Boxscore	Pts: Darthard 23; Rebs: Skeens 11; Asts: Somogyi 8	Attendance: 2,698; Referees: Antonio Conde, Geert Jacobs, Ofer Manheim

28 October 2025	Patrioti Levice (Slovak Basketball Association)	69–71	(Hellenic Basketball Federation) AEK Betsson	Gopass Arena
18:00 (CET)	Scoring by quarter: 17–19, 19–19, 15–18, 18–15
	Pts: McGill 20; Rebs: Carius 9 Asts: McGill 7	Boxscore	Pts: Bartley 21; Rebs: Silva 14; Asts: Lekavicius 4	Attendance: 3,122; Referees: Gvidas Gedvilas, Luis Castillo, Paulo Marques

29 October 2025	NHSZ-Szolnoki Olajbányász (Hungarian Basketball Federation)	77–76	(Latvian Basketball Association) VEF Rīga	DVTK Aréna
18:00 (CET)	Scoring by quarter: 16–19, 26–20, 24–17, 11–20
	Pts: Pallai 21; Rebs: Somogyi 5 Asts: Somogyi 12	Boxscore	Pts: Porter 18; Rebs: Toro 14; Asts: Kilps 7	Attendance: 1,550; Referees: Martin Vulic, Petar Pesic, Yener Yilmaz

11 November 2025	Patrioti Levice (Slovak Basketball Association)	73–71	(Hungarian Basketball Federation) NHSZ-Szolnoki Olajbányász	Gopass Arena
18:30 (CET)	Scoring by quarter: 17–30, 22–14, 15–17, 19–10
	Pts: McGill 29; Rebs: Wesson Jr 9 Asts: Bojanovsky 3	Boxscore	Pts: Barnes 25; Rebs: Skeens 11; Asts: Pallai, Rudner, Somogyi 4	Attendance: 2,979

12 November 2025	AEK Betsson (Hellenic Basketball Federation)	95–64	(Latvian Basketball Association) VEF Rīga	SUNEL Arena
19:30 (EET)	Scoring by quarter: 26–20, 15–21, 24–7, 30–16
	Pts: Bartley 23; Rebs: Silva 9 Asts: Lekavicius 7	Boxscore	Pts: Kilps 14; Rebs: Toro 14; Asts: Kilps 4

10 December 2025	VEF Rīga (Latvian Basketball Association)	76–62	(Hungarian Basketball Federation) NHSZ-Szolnoki Olajbányász	Xiaomi Arena
19:00 (EET)	Scoring by quarter: 19–20, 20–8, 18–21, 19–13
	Pts: Ķilps 19; Rebs: Toro 18; Asts: Andževs 4	Boxscore	Pts: Barnes, Skeens 17; Rebs: Skeens 11; Asts: Pallai 6	Attendance: 2,962; Referees: Antonio Conde, Fernando Calatrava, Ventsislav Velikov

10 December 2025	AEK Betsson (Hellenic Basketball Federation)	99–88(OT)	(Slovak Basketball Association) Patrioti Levice	SUNEL Arena
19:30 (EET)	Scoring by quarter: 27–24, 22–23, 19–16, 14–19, Overtime: 17–6
	Pts: Bartley 22; Rebs: Silva 9 Asts: Bartley 7	Boxscore	Pts: Mawein 24; Rebs: Wesson Jr. 10; Asts: Musić 7	Attendance: 2,279; Referees: Wojciech Liszka, Yener Yılmaz, Carsten Straube

16 December 2025	NHSZ-Szolnoki Olajbányász (Hungarian Basketball Federation)	80–69	(Hellenic Basketball Federation) AEK Betsson	DVTK Aréna
18:00 (CET)	Scoring by quarter: 20–18, 20–28, 22–15, 18–8
	Pts: Krnjajski 24; Rebs: Skeens 11; Asts: Krnjajski 15	Boxscore	Pts: Arms 15; Rebs: Skordilis 9 Asts: Katsivelis 3	Attendance: 1,430; Referees: Luis Castillo, Marius Ciulin, Valerio Grigioni

16 December 2025	Patrioti Levice (Slovak Basketball Association)	85–69	(Latvian Basketball Association) VEF Rīga	Gopass Arena
18:00 (CET)	Scoring by quarter: 27–14, 21–24, 20–11, 17–20
	Pts: McGill 21; Rebs: Wesson Jr. 10; Asts: Musić 5	Boxscore	Pts: Porter 17; Rebs: Toro 13; Asts: Porter 5	Attendance: 3,200; Referees: Martin Horozov, Ioannis Agrafiotis, Orhan Çağrı Hekimoğlu

=== Group G ===
Pos	Team	Pld	W	L	PF	PA	PD	Pts	Qualification	UNI	MSK	KAR	OOS
1	(Spanish Basketball Federation) Unicaja	6	6	0	575	435	+140	12	Advance to round of 16	—	97–66	115–84	102–80
2	(Turkish Basketball Federation) Mersin	6	4	2	415	404	+11	10	Advance to play-ins	77–100	—	81–73	84–76
3	(Hellenic Basketball Federation) Karditsa Iaponiki	6	2	4	461	519	−58	8	Advance to play-ins	55–72	72–80	—	82–78
4	(Basketball Belgium) Filou Oostende	6	0	6	563	656	−93	6		73–89	86–104	93–95	—

Source: FIBA
Legend: Blue = home team win; Red = away team win.

8 October 2025	Unicaja (Spanish Basketball Federation)	97–66	(Turkish Basketball Federation) Mersin	Jose Maria Martin Carpena Arena
20:30 (CEST)	Scoring by quarter: 22–11, 29–20, 19–16, 27–19
	Pts: Castañeda 17; Rebs: Pérez 6 Asts: Balcerowski 4	Boxscore	Pts: Cowan 17; Rebs: Olaseni 7 Asts: Cowan 4	Attendance: 6,962; Referees: Julio Anaya, Yann Vezo Davidson, Ritvars Helmsteins

8 October 2025	Filou Oostende (Basketball Belgium)	93–95(OT)	(Hellenic Basketball Federation) Karditsa Iaponiki	COREtec Dôme
20:30 (CEST)	Scoring by quarter: 21–21, 18–24, 24–13, 20–25, Overtime: 10–12
	Pts: Yaacov 27; Rebs: Gillet 8 Asts: Yaacov 8	Boxscore	Pts: Jefferson 23; Rebs: Wiggins 12; Asts: Jefferson 5	Attendance: 2,810; Referees: Gatis Salins, Carsten Straube, Edgard Ceccarelli

14 October 2025	Karditsa Iaponiki (Hellenic Basketball Federation)	55–72	(Spanish Basketball Federation) Unicaja	Giannis Bourousis Karditsa Municipal Indoor Sports Hall
20:00 (EEST)	Scoring by quarter: 11–23, 9–17, 14–16, 21–16
	Pts: Wiggins 15; Rebs: Wiggins 9 Asts: Jefferson 4	Boxscore	Pts: Kalinoski 12; Rebs: Pérez 8 Asts: Kalinoski 4	Attendance: 2,475; Referees: Martin Horozov, Korenzo Baldini, Marius Ciulin

15 October 2025	Filou Oostende (Basketball Belgium)	86–104	(Turkish Basketball Federation) Mersin	COREtec Dôme
21:00 (CEST)	Scoring by quarter: 17–30, 31–19, 16–24, 22–31
	Pts: Melson 18; Rebs: Yaacov 4 Asts: Estrada 5	Boxscore	Pts: Cobbs 19; Rebs: March Jr. 10; Asts: Cowan 4	Attendance: 3,336; Referees: Petar Pesic, Andris Aunkrogers, Andrea Bongiorni

29 October 2025	Mersin (Turkish Basketball Federation)	81–73	(Hellenic Basketball Federation) Karditsa Iaponiki	Servet Tazegül Arena
20:00 (TRT)	Scoring by quarter: 20–23, 17–16, 27–17, 17–17
	Pts: Olaseni 17; Rebs: March 9 Asts: Cobbs 5	Boxscore	Pts: Jefferson 20; Rebs: Horchler, Madsen 9 Asts: Diplaros 9	Attendance: 2,048; Referees: Boris Krejic, Martin Horozov, Gintaras Maciulis

29 October 2025	Unicaja (Spanish Basketball Federation)	102–80	(Basketball Belgium) Filou Oostende	Jose Maria Martin Carpena Arena
20:30 (CET)	Scoring by quarter: 29–19, 25–22, 25–24, 23–15
	Pts: Perry 22; Rebs: Pérez 8 Asts: Díaz 6	Boxscore	Pts: Estrada 15; Rebs: Bratanovic 7 Asts: Yaacov 7	Attendance: 6,701; Referees: Ademir Zurapovic, Peter Praksch, Juozas Barkauskas

11 November 2025	Karditsa Iaponiki (Hellenic Basketball Federation)	82–78	(Basketball Belgium) Filou Oostende	Giannis Bourousis Karditsa Municipal Indoor Sports Hall
20:00 (EET)	Scoring by quarter: 18–21, 16–16, 24–19, 24–22
	Pts: B. Jefferson 17; Rebs: Madsen 9 Asts: B. Jefferson 5	Boxscore	Pts: Bratanovic 17; Rebs: Gillet 9 Asts: Yaacov 10	Attendance: 1,803

12 November 2025	Mersin (Turkish Basketball Federation)	77–100	(Spanish Basketball Federation) Unicaja	Servet Tazegül Arena
20:00 (TRT)	Scoring by quarter: 22–31, 19–29, 15–21, 21–19
	Pts: March Jr. 14; Rebs: Tırpancı 6 Asts: Cruz 7	Boxscore	Pts: Balcerowski 18; Rebs: Webb III 9 Asts: Perry 8	Attendance: 3,102

9 December 2025	Karditsa Iaponiki (Hellenic Basketball Federation)	72–80	(Turkish Basketball Federation) Mersin	Giannis Bourousis Karditsa Municipal Indoor Sports Hall
20:00 (EET)	Scoring by quarter: 10–26, 18–20, 18–17, 26–17
	Pts: D. Jefferson 20; Rebs: Madsen 9 Asts: Bothwell, Diplaros 4	Boxscore	Pts: White 21; Rebs: Olaseni 14; Asts: Cowan Jr. 9	Attendance: 1,900; Referees: Ademir Zurapović, Michal Proc, Petar Pešić

9 December 2025	Filou Oostende (Basketball Belgium)	73–89	(Spanish Basketball Federation) Unicaja	COREtec Dôme
20:30 (CET)	Scoring by quarter: 16–19, 18–21, 22–25, 17–24
	Pts: Gillet 22; Rebs: Estrada, Fielder, Gillet, Mennes 3 Asts: Yaacov 5	Boxscore	Pts: Balcerowski, Barreiro 13; Rebs: Webb III 8 Asts: Kalinoski 6	Attendance: 2,749; Referees: Martin Vulić, Martin Horozov, Andris Aunkrogers

17 December 2025	Mersin (Turkish Basketball Federation)	84–76	(Basketball Belgium) Filou Oostende	Servet Tazegül Arena
20:30 (TRT)	Scoring by quarter: 18–16, 26–17, 23–15, 17–28
	Pts: March Jr. 30; Rebs: White 18; Asts: Cowan Jr. 11	Boxscore	Pts: Melson, Yaacov 19; Rebs: Gustavson 12; Asts: Yaacov 9	Attendance: 1,960; Referees: Mārtiņš Kozlovskis, Yann Vézo Davidson, Sinisa Prpa

17 December 2025	Unicaja (Spanish Basketball Federation)	115–84	(Hellenic Basketball Federation) Karditsa Iaponiki	Jose Maria Martin Carpena Arena
18:30 (CET)	Scoring by quarter: 35–15, 27–29, 25–20, 28–20
	Pts: Barreiro 15; Rebs: Duarte, Sulejmanović 6 Asts: Perry 7	Boxscore	Pts: Jefferson 26; Rebs: Madsen 5 Asts: Diplaros 10	Attendance: 6,080; Referees: Yener Yılmaz, Ivor Matejek, Silvia Marziali

=== Group H ===
Pos	Team	Pld	W	L	PF	PA	PD	Pts	Qualification	DGC	SPA	MSB	SLB
1	(Spanish Basketball Federation) Dreamland Gran Canaria	6	6	0	518	425	+93	12	Advance to round of 16	—	77–62	73–68	87–63
2	(Basketball Federation of Serbia) Spartak Office Shoes	6	3	3	469	462	+7	9	Advance to play-ins	83–93	—	74–73	99–69
3	(French Federation of Basketball) Le Mans	6	2	4	484	460	+24	8	Advance to play-ins	88–90	76–61	—	89–69
4	(Portuguese Basketball Federation) Benfica	6	1	5	429	553	−124	7		61–98	74–90	93–90	—

Source: FIBA
Legend: Blue = home team win; Red = away team win.

7 October 2025	Benfica (Portuguese Basketball Federation)	61–98	(Spanish Basketball Federation) Dreamland Gran Canaria	Pavilhão Fidelidade
20:30 (WEST)	Scoring by quarter: 16–32, 8–33, 19–22, 18–11
	Pts: McEwen 17; Rebs: Sueing 7 Asts: Crandall 6	Boxscore	Pts: Wong 16; Rebs: Kuath 7 Asts: Samar 10	Attendance: 1,388; Referees: Martins Kozlovskis, Mihkel Männiste, Ivor Matejek

8 October 2025	Spartak Office Shoes (Basketball Federation of Serbia)	74–73	(French Federation of Basketball) Le Mans	Hala Sportova Dudova Šuma
20:00 (CEST)	Scoring by quarter: 18–18, 12–20, 19–13, 25–22
	Pts: Hanlan 15; Rebs: Nikolić 9 Asts: Rebić 5	Boxscore	Pts: Berhanemeskel 17; Rebs: Williams 8 Asts: Hudgins 8	Referees: Lorenzo Baldini, Peter Praksch, Valerio Grigioni

15 October 2025	Dreamland Gran Canaria (Spanish Basketball Federation)	73–68	(French Federation of Basketball) Le Mans	Gran Canaria Arena
20:00 (WEST)	Scoring by quarter: 19–18, 27–21, 13–19, 14–10
	Pts: Wong 18; Rebs: Tobey 10; Asts: Albicy 8	Boxscore	Pts: Hudgins 14; Rebs: Hudgins 6 Asts: Bogues 4	Attendance: 3,581; Referees: Martin Vulic, Yener Yilmaz, Ilias Kounelles

15 October 2025	Benfica (Portuguese Basketball Federation)	74–90	(Basketball Federation of Serbia) Spartak Office Shoes	Pavilhão Fidelidade
20:30 (WEST)	Scoring by quarter: 18–23, 17–25, 24–24, 15–18
	Pts: Crandall 17; Rebs: Sueing 7 Asts: Crandall 6	Boxscore	Pts: Drobnjak 19; Rebs: Thompson 9 Asts: Drobnjak 7	Attendance: 997; Referees: Gatis Salins, Zafer Yilmaz, Zdenko Tomasovic

21 October 2025	Le Mans (French Federation of Basketball)	89–69	(Portuguese Basketball Federation) Benfica	Antarès
20:00 (CEST)	Scoring by quarter: 21–24, 24–19, 17–8, 27–18
	Pts: Hudgins 13; Rebs: DiLeo 9 Asts: Hudgins 6	Boxscore	Pts: Crandall 19; Rebs: Relvão 4 Asts: Crandall 11	Attendance: 5,878; Referees: Ademir Zurapovic, Ariadna Chueca, Geert Jacobs

21 October 2025	Spartak Office Shoes (Basketball Federation of Serbia)	83–93	(Spanish Basketball Federation) Dreamland Gran Canaria	Hala Sportova Dudova Šuma
20:00 (CEST)	Scoring by quarter: 17–23, 22–23, 23–26, 21–21
	Pts: Hanlan 28; Rebs: Nikolić 6 Asts: Hanlan 5	Boxscore	Pts: Angola 24; Rebs: Tobey 7 Asts: Albicy 7	Attendance: 2,650; Referees: Wojciech Liszka, Gvidas Gedvilas, Andris Aunkrogers

5 November 2025	Benfica (Portuguese Basketball Federation)	93–90	(French Federation of Basketball) Le Mans	Pavilhão Fidelidade
17:30 (WET)	Scoring by quarter: 26–19, 21–23, 23–22, 23–26
	Pts: Dziewa 18; Rebs: Sueing 7 Asts: Broussard 8	Boxscore	Pts: Hudgins 30; Rebs: Yeguete 10; Asts: Thomas 7	Attendance: 949; Referees: Peter Praksch, Petar Pesic, Josip Jurcevic

5 November 2025	Dreamland Gran Canaria (Spanish Basketball Federation)	77–62	(Basketball Federation of Serbia) Spartak Office Shoes	Gran Canaria Arena
20:00 (WET)	Scoring by quarter: 28–18, 14–15, 12–16, 23–13
	Pts: Brussino 22; Rebs: Brussino 5 Asts: Brussino 5	Boxscore	Pts: Thompson 15; Rebs: Thompson 11; Asts: Hanlan 6	Attendance: 4,366; Referees: Martins Kozlovskis, Julio Anaya, Lorenzo Baldini

18 November 2025	Le Mans (French Federation of Basketball)	88–90	(Spanish Basketball Federation) Dreamland Gran Canaria	Antarès
20:00 (CET)	Scoring by quarter: 24–16, 21–25, 30–24, 13–25
	Pts: DiLeo 14; Rebs: Dufeal 7 Asts: Hudgins 7	Boxscore	Pts: Angola 25; Rebs: Kuath, Samar 6 Asts: Samar 8	Attendance: 4,157

19 November 2025	Spartak Office Shoes (Basketball Federation of Serbia)	99–69	(Portuguese Basketball Federation) Benfica	Hala Sportova Dudova Šuma
20:00 (CET)	Scoring by quarter: 22–18, 21–15, 30–16, 26–18
	Pts: Thompson 21; Rebs: Ilić, Thompson 6 Asts: Rebić 9	Boxscore	Pts: Crandall 18; Rebs: Crandall 4 Asts: Crandall 5	Attendance: 2,150

16 December 2025	Dreamland Gran Canaria (Spanish Basketball Federation)	87–63	(Portuguese Basketball Federation) Benfica	Gran Canaria Arena
19:00 (WET)	Scoring by quarter: 18–18, 20–17, 22–13, 27–15
	Pts: Brussino 16; Rebs: Kuath 9 Asts: Angola 6	Boxscore	Pts: McEwen 12; Rebs: Romdhane 10; Asts: Crandall 5	Attendance: 2,908; Referees: Péter Praksch, Michal Proc, Cisil Güngör

16 December 2025	Le Mans (French Federation of Basketball)	76–61	(Basketball Federation of Serbia) Spartak Office Shoes	Antarès
20:00 (CET)	Scoring by quarter: 17–16, 14–10, 32–23, 13–12
	Pts: Hudgins 15; Rebs: Dufeal 9 Asts: Dufeal 3	Boxscore	Pts: Hanlan 16; Rebs: Medarević 6 Asts: Medarević, Thompson 3	Attendance: 4,440; Referees: Wojciech Liszka, Fernando Calatrava, Zafer Yilmaz

== See also ==
- 2025–26 Basketball Champions League
- 2025–26 EuroLeague
- 2025–26 EuroCup Basketball
- 2025–26 FIBA Europe Cup
