= Shevon =

Shevon is a given name. Notable people with the name include:

- Shevon John-Brown (born 1995), Grenadian footballer
- Shevon Jemie Lai (born 1993), Malaysian badminton player
- Shevon Nieto (born 1982), former Jamaican hurdler
- Shevon Thompson (born 1993), Jamaican professional basketball player
