= 2021–22 Western Athletic Conference men's basketball season =

2021–22 WAC men's basketball season
- League: NCAA Division I
- Sport: Basketball
- Teams: 13
- TV partner(s): ESPN, ESPN+

Regular season
- Regular season champions: New Mexico State, Seattle, Stephen F. Austin
- Season MVP: Teddy Allen

WAC tournament
- Champions: New Mexico State
- Tournament MVP: Teddy Allen

WAC men's basketball seasons
- ← 2020–21 2022–23 →

2021–22 WAC men's basketball standings
	Conf.				Overall
Team	W		L	PCT	W		L	PCT
New Mexico State †	14	–	4	.778	27	–	7	.794
Seattle	14	–	4	.778	23	–	9	.719
Stephen F. Austin	14	–	4	.778	22	–	10	.688
Grand Canyon	13	–	5	.722	23	–	8	.742
Sam Houston State	13	–	5	.722	19	–	14	.576
Abilene Christian	11	–	7	.611	25	–	11	.694
Utah Valley	10	–	8	.556	20	–	12	.625
Tarleton State *	9	–	9	.500	14	–	17	.452
California Baptist *	7	–	11	.389	18	–	16	.529
Dixie State *	6	–	12	.333	13	–	17	.433
Texas–Rio Grande Valley	3	–	15	.167	8	–	23	.258
Chicago State	3	–	15	.167	7	–	25	.219
Lamar	0	–	18	.000	2	–	27	.069
† 2022 WAC tournament winner * ineligible for the 2022 NCAA tournament due to transition from NCAA Division II

The 2021–22 WAC men's basketball season began with practices in October 2021 followed by the 2021–22 NCAA Division I men's basketball season in November 2021. The conference began play in December 2021. This is the WAC's 60th season of basketball. On July 1, 2021, The WAC officially welcomed four new members: Abilene Christian, Lamar, Sam Houston, and Stephen F. Austin to grow and revitalize the conference. All four were previously in the Southland Conference. The WAC now has 6 full members in Texas, making it the largest DI conference in the state. Each WAC member will play an 18-game conference schedule.

The WAC tournament was held March 9–12, 2022 at the Orleans Arena in Las Vegas, Nevada.

== Pre-season ==
=== WAC Media days ===
The WAC's 2021 WAC media days were October 19–21, 2021 on the (WAC Digital Network).

The teams and representatives in respective order were as follows:

- UTRGV – Matt Figger (HC), Marek Nelson (F), Ricky Nelson (G)
- NM State - Chris Jans (HC), Johhny Mcants (F), Jabari Rice (G)
- Tarleton - Billy Gillispie (HC), Shakur Daniel (G), Freddy Hicks (G/F)
- Sam Houston - Jason Hooten (HC), Demarkus Lampley (G), Savion Flagg (G/F)
- Lamar - Alvin Brooks (HC), Kasen Harrison (G), Lincoln Smith (F)
- Abilene Chrisitan - Brette Tanner (HC), Coryon Mason (G), Reggie Miller (G)
- Seattle U - Jim Hayford (HC), Darrion Trammell (G), Riley Grigsby (G/F)
- Dixie State - Jon Judkins (HC), Cameron Gooden (G), Hunter Schofield (F)
- Chicago State - Gerald Gillion (HC), Bryce Johnson (G), Coreyoun Rushin (G)
- SFA - Kyle Keller (HC), Gavin Kensmil (F), Roti Ware (G), David Kachelries (G)
- Utah Valley - Mark Madsen (HC), Fardaws Aimaq (C), Trey Woodbury (G)
- California Baptist - Rick Croy (HC), Ty Rowell (G), Dan Akin (F)
- Grand Canyon - Bryce Drew (HC), Javon Blacksher (G), Gabe McGlothan (F)

Men's Basketball Coaches Preseason Poll
Place	Team	Points	First place votes
1.	New Mexico State	138	8
2.	Grand Canyon	131	3
3.	Stephen F. Austin	106	1
4.	Utah Valley	103	--
5.	Abilene Christian	92	1
6.	Seattle U	90	--
7.	Sam Houston	86	--
8.	California Baptist	84	--
T-9.	Tarleton State	48	--
T-9.	UTRGV	48	--
11.	Lamar	41	--
12.	Dixie State	35	--
13.	Chicago State	12	--

Men's Basketball Media Preseason Poll
Place	Team
1.	New Mexico State
2.	Stephen F. Austin
3.	Grand Canyon
4.	Abilene Christian
5.	Utah Valley
6.	California Baptist
7.	Sam Houston
8.	Seattle U
9.	Tarleton State
10.	Lamar
11.	UTRGV
12.	Dixie State
13.	Chicago State

=== WAC Preseason All-Conference ===
First Team

Name	School	Yr.	Pos.	Ht., Wt.	Hometown (Last School)
Fardaws Aimaq	Utah Valley	R-So.	C	6'11”, 245	Steveston-London Secondary
Jovan Blacksher Jr.	Grand Canyon	Jr.	G	5'11", 165	Shadow Mountain High School
Montre' Gipson	Tarleton	Sr.	G	6'8”, 259	DeSoto, TX (Ranger College)
Gavin Kensmil	SFA	Sr.	F	6'7”, 260	Paramaribo, Suriname (Iona)
DeMarkus Lampley	Sam Houston	Sr.	G	6'2”, 175	Phenix City, AL (Wallace State CC)
Jabari Rice	NM State	R-Jr.	G	6'4”, 180	Thurgood Marshall High School
Ty Rowell	Cal Baptist	R-Jr.	G	6'2”, 185	Walnut Grove Secondary School
Darrion Trammell	Seattle U	So.	G	5'10”, 165	Marin City, CA (City College of San Francisco)

Second Team

Name	School	Yr.	Pos.	Ht., Wt.	Hometown (Last School)
Teddy Allen	NM State	R-Jr.	G	6'6”, 210	Phoenix, AZ (Nebraska)
Johnny McCants	NM State	R-Sr.	F	6'7”, 230	Oñate High School
Coryon Mason	Abilene Christian	Sr.	G	6'0”, 190	Douglass High School
Reggie Miller	Abilene Christian	Sr.	G	6'0”, 160	Klein Forest High School
Reed Nottage	Cal Baptist	So.	G	6'7”, 220	Newington College
Roti Ware	SFA	Sr.	G	6'3”, 190	Morton, MS (East Central Community College)
Trey Woodbury	Utah Valley	Jr.	G	6'4”, 200	Las Vegas, NV (UNLV)
Holland Woods II	Grand Canyon	Sr.	G	6'1”, 190	Phoenix, AZ (Arizona State)

Preseaon Player of the Year

Fardaws Aimaq

== Regular season ==
Before the season, the WAC announced a new media deal in which most regular season conference games would be broadcast on ESPN+, with select regular season games and all conference tournament games airing on ESPN Linear Networks.

=== Early season tournaments ===
Team	Tournament	Finish
Dixie State	Good Sam Empire Classic at CSUN	4th
New Mexico State	Myrtle Beach Invitational	4th
Sam Houston	Jacksonville Classic	6th
Stephen F. Austin	Cancun Challenge	2nd
Utah Valley	SoCal Challenge	1st

=== Records against other conferences ===
2021–22 records against non-conference foes through (December 29, 2021):

Regular season

Power Conferences & Gonzaga	Record
ACC	0–1
Big East	0–0
Big Ten	0–3
Big 12	0–7
Pac-12	2–8
SEC	0–2
Gonzaga	0–2
Power Conference Total	2–23
Other NCAA Division I Conferences	Record
America East	0–0
American	0–2
A-10	1–1
ASUN	2–1
Big Sky	5–4
Big South	1–1
Big West	6–3
CAA	1–0
C-USA	4–3
Horizon	1–0
Ivy League	0–0
MAAC	0–0
MAC	1–3
MEAC	2–0
MVC	1–5
Mountain West	3–6
NEC	0–0
OVC	3–0
Patriot League	0–2
SoCon	0–1
Southland	4–3
SWAC	7–1
The Summit	6–2
Sun Belt	4–7
WCC (except Gonzaga)	6–1
Other Division I Total	0–0
Division II Total	4–0
NCAA Division I Total	61–69

=== Record against ranked non-conference opponents ===
This is a list of games against ranked opponents only (rankings from the AP Poll):

Date	Visitor	Home	Site	Significance	Score	Conference record
Nov. 9, 2021	Dixie State	No. 1 Gonzaga	McCarthey Athletic Center ● Spokane, WA	—	L 63-97	0-1
Nov. 12, 2021	Tarleton State	No. 3 Kansas	Allen Fieldhouse ● Lawrence, KS	―	L 62-88	0-2
Nov. 22, 2021	Dixie State	No. 24 USC	Galen Center ● Los Angeles, CA	―	L 71-98	0-3
Nov. 24, 2021	California Baptist	No. 8 Texas	Frank Erwin Center ● Austin, TX	Abe Lemons Classic	L 44-68	0-4
Nov. 24, 2021	Tarleton State	No. 20 Michigan	Crisler Center ● Ann Arbor, MI	―	L 54-65	0-5
Nov. 26, 2021	UTRGV	No. 14 Illinois	State Farm Center ● Champaign, IL	―	L 85-94	0-6
Nov. 29, 2021	Tarleton State	No. 3 Gonzaga	McCarthey Athletic Center ● Spokane, WA	―	L 55-64	0-7
Nov. 29, 2021	Sam Houston	No. 7 Texas	Gregory Gymnasium ● Austin, TX	―	L 57-73	0-8
Dec. 1, 2021	No. 12 BYU	Utah Valley	UCCU Center ● Orem, UT	UCCU Crosstown Clash	W 72-65 OT	1-8
Dec. 3, 2021	UTRGV	No. 7 Texas	Frank Erwin Center ● Austin, TX	―	L 58-88	1-9
Dec. 18, 2021	California Baptist	No. 8 Arizona	McKale Center ● Tucson, AZ	―	L 60-84	1-10
Dec. 18, 2021	SFA	No. 7 Kansas	Allen Fieldhouse ● Lawrence, KS	―	L 72-80	1-11
Dec. 21, 2021	Chicago State	No. 9 Iowa State	Hilton Coliseum ● Ames, IA	―	L 48-79	1-12

Team rankings are reflective of AP poll when the game was played, not current or final ranking

† denotes game was played on neutral site

=== Conference schedule ===
This table summarizes the head-to-head results between teams in conference play.

	Abilene Christian	California Baptist	Chicago State	Dixie State	Grand Canyon	Lamar	New Mexico State	Sam Houston	Seattle U	Stephen F. Austin	Tarleton State	UTRGV	Utah Valley
vs. Abilene Christian	–	0–1	0–1	0–2	1–0	0–2	1–0	2–0	1–0	2–0	0–2	0–2	0–1
vs. California Baptist	1–0	–	1–1	1–1	2–0	0–2	1–0	1–0	2–0	1–0	0–1	0–1	1–1
vs. Chicago State	1–0	1–1	–	1–0	2–0	0–1	1–1	1–0	2–0	2–0	2–0	1–0	1–0
vs. Dixie State	2–0	1–1	0–1	–	1–1	0–1	2–0	1–0	2–0	1–0	1–0	0–1	1–1
vs. Grand Canyon	0–1	0–2	0–2	1–1	–	0–1	2–0	1–1	0–1	1–0	0–1	0–1	0–2
vs. Lamar	2–0	2–0	1–0	1–0	1–0	–	1–0	2–0	1–0	2–0	2–0	2–0	1–0
vs. New Mexico State	0–1	0–1	1–1	0–2	0–2	0–1	–	1–0	0–2	1–1	0–1	0–1	1–1
vs. Sam Houston	0–2	0–1	0–1	0–1	1–1	0–2	0–1	–	1–0	1–1	1–1	0–2	1–0
vs. Seattle U	0–1	0–2	0–2	0–2	1–0	0–1	2–0	0–1	–	0–1	0–1	0–2	1–1
vs. Stephen F. Austin	0–2	0–1	0–2	0–1	0–1	0–2	1–1	1–1	1–0	–	1–0	0–2	0–1
vs. Tarleton State	2–0	1–0	0–2	0–1	1–0	0–2	1–0	1–1	1–0	0–1	–	0–2	2–0
vs. UTRGV	2–0	1–0	0–1	1–0	1–0	0–2	1–0	2–0	2–0	2–0	2–0	–	1-0
vs. Utah Valley	1–0	1–1	0–1	1–1	2–0	0–1	1–1	0–1	1–1	1–0	0–2	0-1	–
Total	11–7	7–11	3–15	6–12	13–5	0–18	14–4	13–5	14–4	14–4	9–9	3–15	10–8

=== Points scored ===
Team	For	Against	Difference
Abilene Christian	2,519	2,191	+328
California Baptist	2,344	2,220	+124
Chicago State	1,987	2,380	-393
Dixie State	2,247	2,296	-49
Grand Canyon	2,204	1,898	+306
Lamar	1,778	2,116	-338
New Mexico State	2,346	2,081	+265
Sam Houston	2,272	2,082	+190
Seattle U	2,393	2,132	+261
Stephen F. Austin	2,317	2,110	+207
Tarleton State	2,002	2,025	-23
UTRGV	2,212	2,436	-224
Utah Valley	2,279	2,084	+195

Through end of season

=== Rankings ===
	Improvement in ranking
	Drop in ranking
RV	Received votes but were not ranked in Top 25
NV	No votes received

		Pre	Wk 2	Wk 3	Wk 4	Wk 5	Wk 6	Wk 7	Wk 8	Wk 9	Wk 10	Wk 11	Wk 12	Wk 13	Wk 14	Wk 15	Wk 16	Wk 17	Wk 18	Wk 19	Final
Abilene Christian	AP	NV	NV	NV	NV	NV	NV	NV	NV	NV	NV	NV	NV	NV	NV	NV	NV	NV	NV	NV	NV
Abilene Christian	C	NV	NV	NV	NV	NV	NV	NV	NV	NV	NV	NV	NV	NV	NV	NV	NV	NV	NV	NV	NV
California Baptist	AP	NV	NV	NV	NV	NV	NV	NV	NV	NV	NV	NV	NV	NV	NV	NV	NV	NV	NV	NV	NV
California Baptist	C	NV	NV	NV	NV	NV	NV	NV	NV	NV	NV	NV	NV	NV	NV	NV	NV	NV	NV	NV	NV
Chicago State	AP	NV	NV	NV	NV	NV	NV	NV	NV	NV	NV	NV	NV	NV	NV	NV	NV	NV	NV	NV	NV
Chicago State	C	NV	NV	NV	NV	NV	NV	NV	NV	NV	NV	NV	NV	NV	NV	NV	NV	NV	NV	NV	NV
Dixie State	AP	NV	NV	NV	NV	NV	NV	NV	NV	NV	NV	NV	NV	NV	NV	NV	NV	NV	NV	NV	NV
Dixie State	C	NV	NV	NV	NV	NV	NV	NV	NV	NV	NV	NV	NV	NV	NV	NV	NV	NV	NV	NV	NV
Grand Canyon	AP	NV	NV	NV	NV	NV	NV	NV	NV	NV	NV	NV	NV	NV	NV	NV	NV	NV	NV	NV	NV
Grand Canyon	C	NV	NV	NV	NV	NV	NV	NV	NV	NV	NV	NV	NV	NV	NV	NV	NV	NV	NV	NV	NV
Lamar	AP	NV	NV	NV	NV	NV	NV	NV	NV	NV	NV	NV	NV	NV	NV	NV	NV	NV	NV	NV	NV
Lamar	C	NV	NV	NV	NV	NV	NV	NV	NV	NV	NV	NV	NV	NV	NV	NV	NV	NV	NV	NV	NV
New Mexico State	AP	NV	NV	NV	NV	NV	NV	NV	NV	NV	NV	NV	NV	NV	NV	NV	NV	NV	NV	NV	NV
New Mexico State	C	NV	NV	NV	NV	NV	NV	NV	NV	NV	NV	NV	NV	NV	NV	NV	NV	NV	NV	NV	NV
Sam Houston	AP	NV	NV	NV	NV	NV	NV	NV	NV	NV	NV	NV	NV	NV	NV	NV	NV	NV	NV	NV	NV
Sam Houston	C	NV	NV	NV	NV	NV	NV	NV	NV	NV	NV	NV	NV	NV	NV	NV	NV	NV	NV	NV	NV
Seattle U	AP	NV	NV	NV	NV	NV	NV	NV	NV	NV	NV	NV	NV	NV	NV	NV	NV	NV	NV	NV	NV
Seattle U	C	NV	NV	NV	NV	NV	NV	NV	NV	NV	NV	NV	NV	NV	NV	NV	NV	NV	NV	NV	NV
Stephen F. Austin	AP	NV	NV	NV	NV	NV	NV	NV	NV	NV	NV	NV	NV	NV	NV	NV	NV	NV	NV	NV	NV
Stephen F. Austin	C	NV	NV	NV	NV	NV	NV	NV	NV	NV	NV	NV	NV	NV	NV	NV	NV	NV	NV	NV	NV
Tarleton State	AP	NV	NV	NV	NV	NV	NV	NV	NV	NV	NV	NV	NV	NV	NV	NV	NV	NV	NV	NV	NV
Tarleton State	C	NV	NV	NV	NV	NV	NV	NV	NV	NV	NV	NV	NV	NV	NV	NV	NV	NV	NV	NV	NV
UTRGV	AP	NV	NV	NV	NV	NV	NV	NV	NV	NV	NV	NV	NV	NV	NV	NV	NV	NV	NV	NV	NV
UTRGV	C	NV	NV	NV	NV	NV	NV	NV	NV	NV	NV	NV	NV	NV	NV	NV	NV	NV	NV	NV	NV
Utah Valley	AP	NV	NV	NV	NV	NV	NV	NV	NV	NV	NV	NV	NV	NV	NV	NV	NV	NV	NV	NV	NV
Utah Valley	C	NV	NV	NV	RV	NV	NV	NV	NV	NV	NV	NV	NV	NV	NV	NV	NV	NV	NV	NV	NV

== Head coaches ==
=== Coaching changes ===
Many coaching changes were made during the offseason. UTRGV Coach Lew Hill shockingly died during the previous season on February 7, 2021. Jai Steadman then acted as interim head coach for the remainder of the season. Several months later, UTRGV announced Matt Figger as Hill's permanent replacement. Chicago State head coach Lance Irvin was fired in the offseason, posting a 7-54 overall record during his tenure. The Cougars tabbed Samford assistant coach Gerald Gillion to be their new head coach. Former Abilene Christian head coach Joe Golding left his position to take on a new position at UTEP, and his replacement was announced to be Brette Tanner, who was the associate head coach for ACU for 7 seasons. Lamar head coach Tic Price was fired shortly after the season ended, and Lamar hired Alvin Brooks, a former Lamar player himself, as their new head coach.

=== Coaches ===
Note: Stats shown are before the beginning of the season. Overall and WAC records are from time at current school.

Team	Head coach	Previous job	Seasons at school	Overall record	WAC record	WAC titles	NCAA tournaments	NCAA Final Fours	NCAA Championships
Abilene Christian	Brette Tanner	(Associate HC)	1st	0–0 (–)	0–0 (–)	0	0	0	0
California Baptist	Rick Croy	Buffalo (assistant)	3rd	50-35 (.588)	23-21 (.523)	0	0	0	0
Chicago State	Gerald Gillion	Samford (assistant)	1st	0-0 (–)	0-0 (–)	0	0	0	0
Dixie State	Jon Judkins	Snow College	2nd	8-13 (.381)	4-10 (.286)	0	0	0	0
Grand Canyon	Bryce Drew	Vanderbilt	2nd	17-7 (.708)	9-3 (.750)	1	1	0	0
Lamar	Alvin Brooks	Houston (associate HC)	1st	0-0 (–)	0-0 (–)	0	0	0	0
New Mexico State	Chris Jans	Bowling Green	5th	95-27 (.779)	50-9 (.847)	3	3	0	0
Sam Houston	Jason Hooten	(Assistant HC)	12th	0-0 (–)	0-0 (–)	0	0	0	0
Seattle U	Jim Hayford	Eastern Washington	5th	64-55 (.538)	25-27 (.481)	0	0	0	0
Stephen F. Austin	Kyle Keller	Texas A&M (assistant)	6th	0-0 (–)	0–0 (–)	0	0	0	0
Tarleton State	Billy Gillispie	Ranger College	2nd	10-10 (.500)	5-7 (.417)	0	1	0	0
UTRGV	Matt Figger	Austin Peay	1st	0-0 (–)	0-0 (–)	0	0	0	0
Utah Valley	Mark Madsen	Los Angeles Lakers (player development)	3rd	22-30 (.423)	14-14 (.500)	1	0	0	0

Notes:

- Overall and WAC records, conference titles, etc. are from time at current school and are through the end the 2020–21 season.
- Records and season totals only include time spent at Division I as head coach.
- NCAA tournament appearances are from time at current school only.
- NCAA Final Fours and Championship include time at other schools.

== Postseason ==
=== WAC tournament ===
The conference tournament is scheduled to be played from March 9–12, 2022, at the Orleans Arena in Las Vegas, NV. However, the site for the first round of games has yet to be determined. Ten members will be invited to the tournament, with the top six seeds receiving at least one bye. Dixie and Tarleton are ineligible for the tournament until 2022-23 due to Division I transitions.

=== NCAA tournament ===
Teams from the conference that were selected to participate:

Seed	Region	School	First Four	First Round	Second Round	Sweet Sixteen	Elite Eight	Final Four	Championship
12	West	New Mexico State	–	defeated (5) Connecticut 70–63	lost to (4) Arkansas 53–48	–	–	–	–
	Bids	W-L (%):	0–0 (–)	1–0 (1.000)	0–1 (.000)	0–0 (–)	0–0 (–)	0–0 (–)	TOTAL: 1–1 (.500)

=== National Invitation Tournament ===
Number from the conference that were selected to participate: 0

Seed	Bracket	School	First Round	Second Round	Quarterfinals	Semifinals	Finals
N/A	N/A	N/A	−	−	−	−	−
	Bid	W-L (%):	0–0 (–)	0–0 (–)	0–0 (–)	0–0 (–)	TOTAL: 0–0 (–)

Index to colors and formatting
WAC member won
WAC member lost

== Awards and honors ==
=== Players of the week ===
Throughout the conference regular season, the WAC offices name a player of the week, and a freshman of the week each Monday.

Week	Player of the Week	School	Freshman of the Week	School	Ref.
Nov. 15	Brandon Betson	Chicago St.	Taran Armstrong	California Baptist	
Nov. 22	Fardaws Aimaq	Utah Valley	Taran Armstrong	California Baptist	
Nov. 29	Fardaws Aimaq	Utah Valley	Viktor Rajković	Seattle U	
Dec. 6	Fardaws Aimaq	Utah Valley	Taran Armstrong	California Baptist	
Dec. 13	Cameron Gooden	Dixie State	RayQuan Taylor	UTRGV	
Dec. 20	Teddy Allen	New Mexico State	Noa Gonsalves	Dixie State	
Dec. 27	Emeka Udenyi	Seattle U	Marchelus Avery	New Mexico State	
Jan. 3	Cameron Steele	Abilene Christian	Ali Abdou Dibba	Chicago St.	
Jan. 10	Tahj Small	Tarleton	Noah McDavid	Tarleton	
Jan. 17	Teddy Allen	New Mexico State	Juhlawnei Stone	California Baptist	
Jan. 24	Cameron Tyson	Seattle U	Vas Pandža	Seattle U	
Jan. 31	Teddy Allen	New Mexico State	Noah McDavid	Tarleton	
Feb. 7	Airion Simmons	Abilene Christian	RayQuan Taylor	UTRGV	
Feb. 14	Fardaws Aimaq	Utah Valley	Taran Armstrong	California Baptist	
Feb. 21	Teddy Allen	New Mexico State	Derrick Tezeno	Stephen F. Austin	
Feb. 28	Fardaws Aimaq	Utah Valley	Chance McMillian	Grand Canyon	
Mar. 6	Gavin Kensmil	Stephen F. Austin	Taran Armstrong	California Baptist	

==== Totals per school - Players of the week ====
School	Total
Abilene Christian University	2
California Baptist University	6
Chicago State	2
Dixie State	2
Grand Canyon University	1
New Mexico State University	5
Seattle University	4
Stephen F. Austin State University	2
Tarleton State University	3
University of Texas Rio Grande Valley	2
Utah Valley University	5

=== All-WAC ===
First team

Name	School	Yr.	Pos.	Ht.	Hometown
Fardaws Aimaq‡‡	Utah Valley	R-So.	C	6-11	Vancouver, B.C., Canada
Teddy Allen‡	NM State	R-Jr.	G	6-6	Phoenix
Jovan Blacksher Jr.	Grand Canyon	So.	G	5-11	Oakland, Calif.
Gavin Kensmil	Stephen F. Austin	Sr.	F	6-7	Paramaribo, Suriname
Savion Flagg	Sam Houston	Gr.	G/F	6-7	Alvin, Texas
Hunter Schofield	Dixie State	Sr.	F	6-8	Spanish Fork, Utah
Darrion Trammell	Seattle U	So.	G	5-10	Marin City, Calif.
Cameron Tyson	Seattle U	R-So.	G	6-2	Bothell, Wash.

- ‡ WAC Player of the Year
- ‡‡ WAC Defensive Player of the Year

Second team

Name	School	Yr.	Pos.	Ht.	Hometown
Brandon Betson	Chicago State	Jr.	G	6-1	Hercules, Calif.
Montre' Gipson	Tarleton	Sr.	G	5-11	DeSoto, Texas
Justin Johnson	UT Rio Grande Valley	Jr.	G/F	6-6	Fort Lauderdale, Fla.
David Kachelries	Stephen F. Austin	Sr.	G	6-1	Emmaus, Pa.
Johnny McCants	NM State	R-Sr.	F	6-7	Las Cruces, N.M.
Sir'Jabari Rice$	NM State	R-Jr.	G	6-4	Houston
Airion Simmons	Abilene Christian	Jr.	F	6-5	Little Rock, Ark.
Holland Woods	Grand Canyon	Sr.	G	6-1	Phoenix

==== All-Newcomer team ====
Name	School	Yr.	Pos.	Ht.,	Hometown
Teddy Allen†	NM State	R-Jr.	G	6-6	Phoenix
Savion Flagg	Sam Houston	Gr.	G/F	6-7	Alvin, Texas
Justin Johnson	UT Rio Grande Valley	Jr.	G/F	6-6	Fort Lauderdale, Fla.
Cameron Tyson	Seattle U	R-So.	G	6-2	Bothell, Wash.
Holland Woods	Grand Canyon	Sr.	G	6-1	Phoenix

† WAC Player of the Year & Newcomer of the Year

==== All-Defensive team ====
Name	School	Yr.	Pos.	Ht.	Hometown
Fardaws Aimaq‡	Utah Valley	R-So.	C	6-11	Vancouver, B.C., Canada
Shamir Bogues	Tarleton	So.	G	6-4	Killeen, Texas
Javion May	Sam Houston	Jr.	G	6-2	Chicago
Johnny McCants	NM State	R-Sr.	F	6-7	Las Cruces, N.M.
Darrion Trammell	Seattle U	So.	G	5-10	Marin City, Calif.

- ‡WAC Defensive Player of the Year

==== Other awards ====
Sixth Man of the Year: Jaylin Jackson-Posey, Stephen F. Austin

Freshman of the Year: Taran Armstrong, California Baptist

Don Haskins Coach of the Year: Chris Victor, Seattle U

== 2022 NBA draft ==
No players from the Western Athletic Conference were drafted in the 2022 NBA Draft.

Round	Pick	Player	Position	Nationality	Team	School/club team
−	−				−	

== Home game attendance ==
Team	Stadium	Capacity	Game 1	Game 2	Game 3	Game 4	Game 5	Game 6	Game 7	Game 8	Game 9	Game 10	Game 11	Game 12	Game 13	Game 14	Game 15	Game 16	Game 17	Game 18	Game 19	Total	Average	% of Capacity
Abilene Christian	Teague Center	1,000	414	605	598	842	603	513	321	474	807	**1,098**	**1,179**	726	444	**1,088**	928	829	**1,213†**			12,682	746	74.6%
California Baptist	CBU Events Center	5,050	4,308	4,957	2,631	3,004	2,229	2,248	3,401	2,606	2,220	1,892	2,014	2,305	2,531	3,005	4,311	2,436	4,651	**5,050†**	3,565	59,364	3,124	61.9%
Chicago State	Emil and Patricia Jones Convocation Center	7,000	300	350	597†	267	262	187	102	250	119	147	142	128	151	207						3,209	229	3.3%
Dixie State	Burns Arena	4,779	4,105	2,352	1,501	1,672	2,017	1,276	512	967	719	1,228	1,560	1,333	1,898	4,270†	1,269	1,288				27,967	1,748	36.6%
Grand Canyon	GCU Arena	7,000	**7,145**	**7,305**	6,854	6,872	6,529	6,844	6,715	**7,007**	6,817	6,815	**7,499†**	6,905	**7,107**	**7,174**	**7,112**	6,950	**7,412**			119,062	7,004	100.1%
Lamar	Montagne Center	10,080	2,586	3,532†	1,512	1,543			1,712	1,582	2,116	2,487	818	2,896	2,345							23,129	2,103	20.9%
New Mexico State	Pan American Center	12,482	5,056	8,089	4,739	6,208	4,086	4,315	5,360	5,131	5,014	12,307†	4,431	6,302	4,424	5,611	5,707					86,780	5,785	46.3%
Sam Houston	Bernard Johnson Coliseum	6,110	1,017	741	301	197	214	131	1,114	491	602	426	640	382	1,319†							7,575	583	9.5%
Seattle U	Redhawk Center/Climate Pledge Arena	999/18,100	503††	2,302‡	524††	1,082‡	450††	314††	775‡	1,334‡	1,998‡	465††	1,260‡	456††	1,621‡	725††	2,488‡†	592††	1,670‡	**999††**	**999††**	20,557	1,082	11.9%
Stephen F. Austin	William R. Johnson Coliseum	7,203	1,442	1,537	1,878	1,901	1,702	1,431	1,550		1,709	1,703	2,304	2,551	N/A	1,859	1,524	2,353	2,580†			28,024	1,868	25.9%
Tarleton State	Wisdom Gymnasium	3,000	838	2,112	712	848	802	1,423	1,627	2,022	1,899	2,022	2,223	2,884	**3,017†**	1,074	1,763					25,266	1,684	56.1%
UTRGV	UTRGV Fieldhouse/Bert Ogden Arena	2,500/7,688	1,711	873	1,681	1,189‡‡		878	846	537	713	1,453	818	1,618	2,717†‡‡	974						16,008	1,100/1,953	44.0%/25.4%
Utah Valley	UCCU Center	8,500	N/A	1,386	7,503†		1,363	1,472	1,267	2,523	1,574	1,511	3,724	1,868	2,547	2,187						28,925	2,410	28.4%
Total		93,803																				458,548	2,340	–

Bold – At or exceed capacity

- †Season high
- ††Redhawk Center
- ‡Climate Pledge Arena
- ‡‡Bert Ogden Arena
