= Our Saviour Lutheran School =

Location
- 1734 Williamsbridge Road, Morris Park, Bronx; New York City, New York 10461; United States; 40.84989°N 73.85058°W

Information
- Type: Private school
- Religious affiliation: Lutheran Church–Missouri Synod
- Established: 1942
- Oversight: Lutheran Church of Our Saviour
- NCES School ID: 00938512
- Teaching staff: 13.0 (on an FTE basis)
- Grades: K–12
- Gender: Co-educational
- Enrollment: 16 (2017–2018)
- Student to teacher ratio: 1.2
- Nickname: Falcons
- Website: www.oslbronx.org

Our Saviour Lutheran School is a private, Lutheran Church–Missouri Synod, co-educational school in Morris Park, Bronx, New York City, New York, United States. The origins of its younger grades' school began in 1942, and its high school was established in 1955. It is part of the Lutheran Church of Our Saviour.

Its class sizes are small and there is a dress code. It is an accredited member of the Middle States Association of Colleges and Schools.

== Athletics ==
The school's athletic teams are known as the Falcons. Three sports are offered: basketball, track and field, and volleyball. The basketball program has produced several NCAA Division I college recruits. During the school's 2022–23 years, the basketball program joined the Word of God Christian Academy in Raleigh, North Carolina and Hillcrest Prep Academy in Phoenix, Arizona as a part of Overtime Elite alongside the program's own YNG Dreamerz, Cold Hearts, and City Reapers teams.

== Notable alumni ==
- Precious Achiuwa, basketball player for the Sacramento Kings
- Posh Alexander, basketball player
- Justin Burrell, basketball player
- Ace Frehley, guitarist and co-founding member of the hard rock band Kiss
- Ian Jackson, basketball player at St. John's University
- Zahir Porter, professional basketball player in the Israeli Basketball Premier League
- Jared Rhoden, basketball player for Paris Basketball
- Will Calhoun, drummer for the band Living Colour
