= Jean-Marc Pansa =

French basketball player

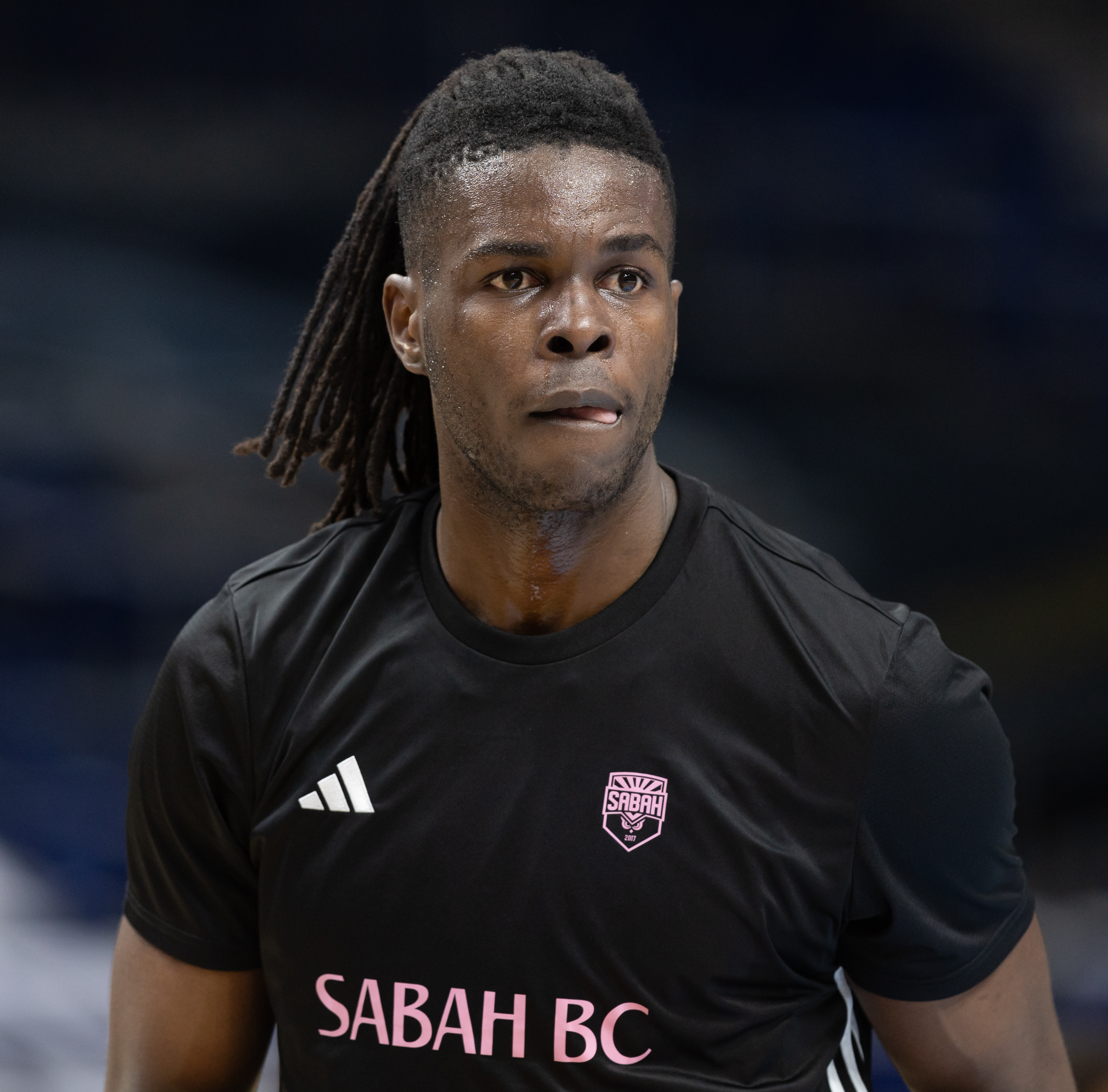
- Pansa in 2025

No. 20 – UCAM Murcia
- Position: Center
- League: Liga ACB; Champions League

Personal information
- Born: 20 August 1997 (age 29) Kourou, French Guiana
- Listed height: 2.08 m (6 ft 10 in)
- Listed weight: 93 kg (205 lb)

Career information
- Playing career: 2016–present

Career history
- 2016–2020: Nanterre 92
- 2020–2023: Antibes Sharks
- 2023–2024: Boulazac Basket
- 2024–2025: JL Bourg
- 2025–2026: Sabah BC
- 2026–present: UCAM Murcia

Career highlights
- FIBA Europe Cup champion (2017); French Cup champion (2017)

Jean-Marc Pansa (born 20 August 1997) is a French professional basketball player for UCAM Murcia of the Liga ACB. Standing at 2.08 m (6 ft 10 in), Pansa plays as center.

== Professional career ==
Pansa made his professional debut in the 2016–17 season, as he played in 6 matches with Nanterre 92 in the LNB Pro A, averaging 1.0 point per game.

In April 2018, Pansa declared for the 2018 NBA draft.

On June 30, 2020, he has signed with Antibes Sharks of the LNB Pro B.

On June 22, 2024, he signed with JL Bourg of the LNB Pro A.

On July 19, 2025, he signed with Sabah BC of the Azerbaijan Basketball League.

On July 3, 2026, he signed with UCAM Murcia of the Liga ACB.
