= Hassani Gravett =

American basketball player (born 1996)

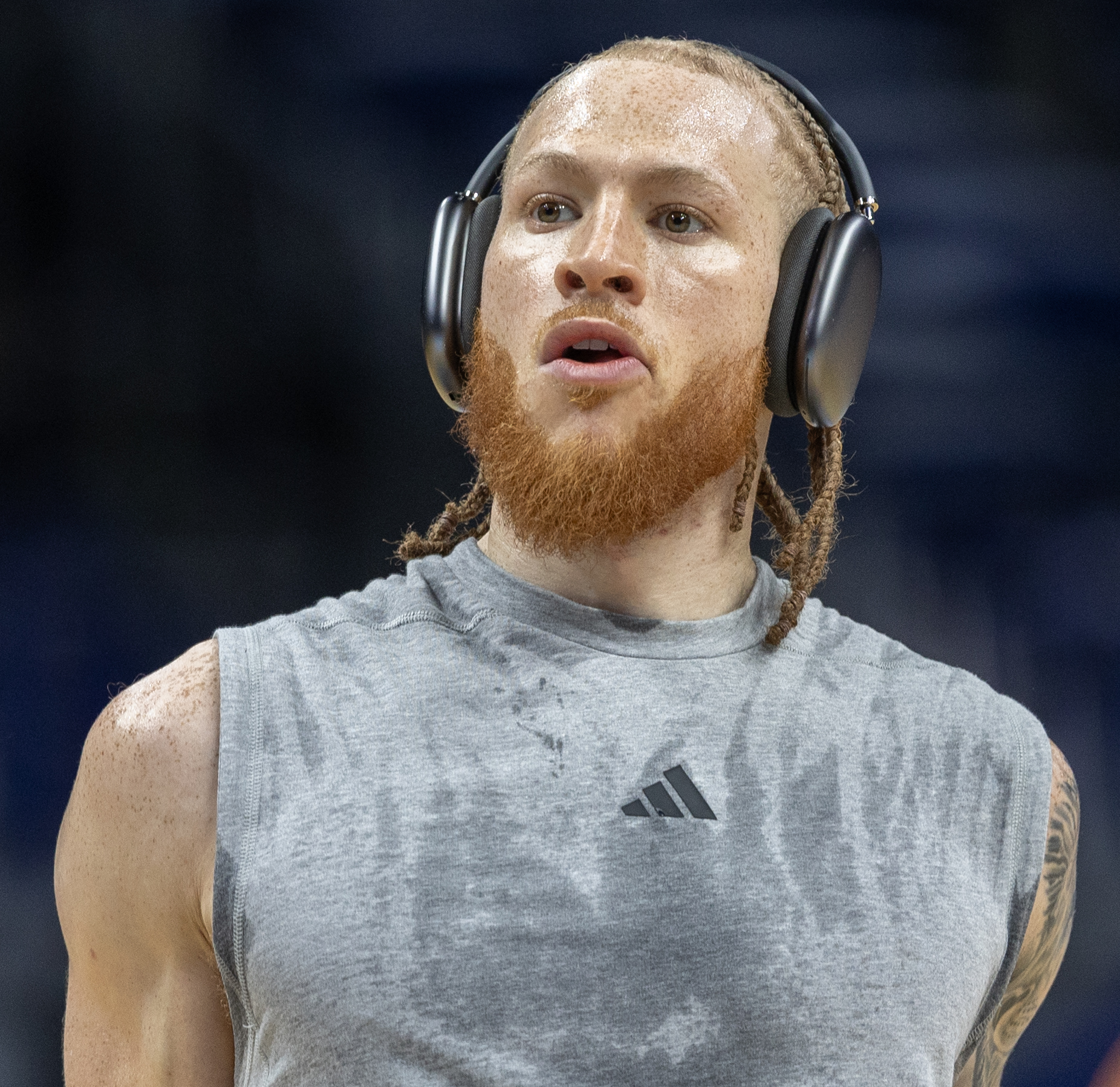
- Gravett in 2025

No. 3 – Pallacanestro Cantù
- Position: Point guard
- League: LBA

Personal information
- Born: July 16, 1996 (age 30) Villa Rica, Georgia, U.S.
- Listed height: 6 ft 2 in (1.88 m)
- Listed weight: 187 lb (85 kg)

Career information
- High school: Robert S. Alexander (Douglasville, Georgia); Hargrave Military Academy (Chatham, Virginia)
- College: Pensacola State (2015–2016); South Carolina (2016–2019)
- NBA draft: 2019: undrafted
- Playing career: 2019–present

Career history
- 2019–2020: Lakeland Magic
- 2020–2021: MZT Skopje
- 2021: Lakeland Magic
- 2021–2022: Orlando Magic
- 2022: Lakeland Magic
- 2022: Memphis Hustle
- 2022–2023: Raptors 905
- 2023: Baskets Oldenburg
- 2023–2024: Śląsk Wrocław
- 2024: Indios
- 2024–2026: Sabah
- 2026–present: Pallacanestro Cantù

Career highlights
- Macedonian League champion (2021); Macedonian Cup winner (2021); SEC Sixth Man of the Year (2019)
- Stats at NBA.com
- Stats at Basketball Reference

Hassani Jevon Rooks Gravett (born July 16, 1996) is an American professional basketball player for Pallacanestro Cantù of the Lega Basket Serie A (LBA). He played college basketball for South Carolina.

== Early life and high school career ==
Gravett was born in Anniston, Alabama. Due to his family having military backgrounds, he has lived in many states as well as abroad. He spent two years in Italy, and spent several summers in Germany. However, he was mainly raised in the city of Atlanta, Georgia.

Gravett attended Robert S. Alexander High School in Douglasville, Georgia. As a senior, he scored a career-high 46 points in a state tournament semifinal loss. He was named the Georgia Class 4A Player of the Year by the Atlanta Journal-Constitution, an All-Metro selection by the Atlanta Tipoff Club, and was picked to play in the GACA All-Star Game. Gravett originally signed with Gardner–Webb out of high school before deciding to do a prep year at the Hargrave Military Academy. He committed to Louisiana-Lafayette in November 2014. He later rescinded his commitment and decided to play at Pensacola State College.

== College career ==
Gravett dealt with injuries in his freshman season at Pensacola State and only played 12 of the final 14 games. He averaged 16.1 points, 7.1 rebounds and 3.8 assists per game. On April 18, 2016, Gravett signed with South Carolina, choosing the Gamecocks over offers from West Virginia, Missouri, St. Louis and East Carolina.

In his sophomore season at South Carolina, he helped the Gamecocks reach the Final Four. He averaged 3.2 points and 1.6 rebounds per game as a sophomore. As a junior, Gravett averaged 7.4 points, 3.6 rebounds, and 3.6 assists per game as South Carolina missed the postseason. In his senior season, the addition of transfer Tre Cambell and freshmen A. J. Lawson and T.J. Moss allowed Gravett to move to shooting guard, and he had 22 points in a win against Florida. He was teased by the Florida student section for his hair, as they chanted "Blooming Onion". Gravett started five of 32 games as a senior, averaging 11.4 points, 3.8 rebounds and 2.4 assists per game, while shooting 39.9 percent from behind the arc and led the Gamecocks with 65 three-pointers. Gravett was named SEC Sixth Man of the Year by the coaches.

== Professional career ==
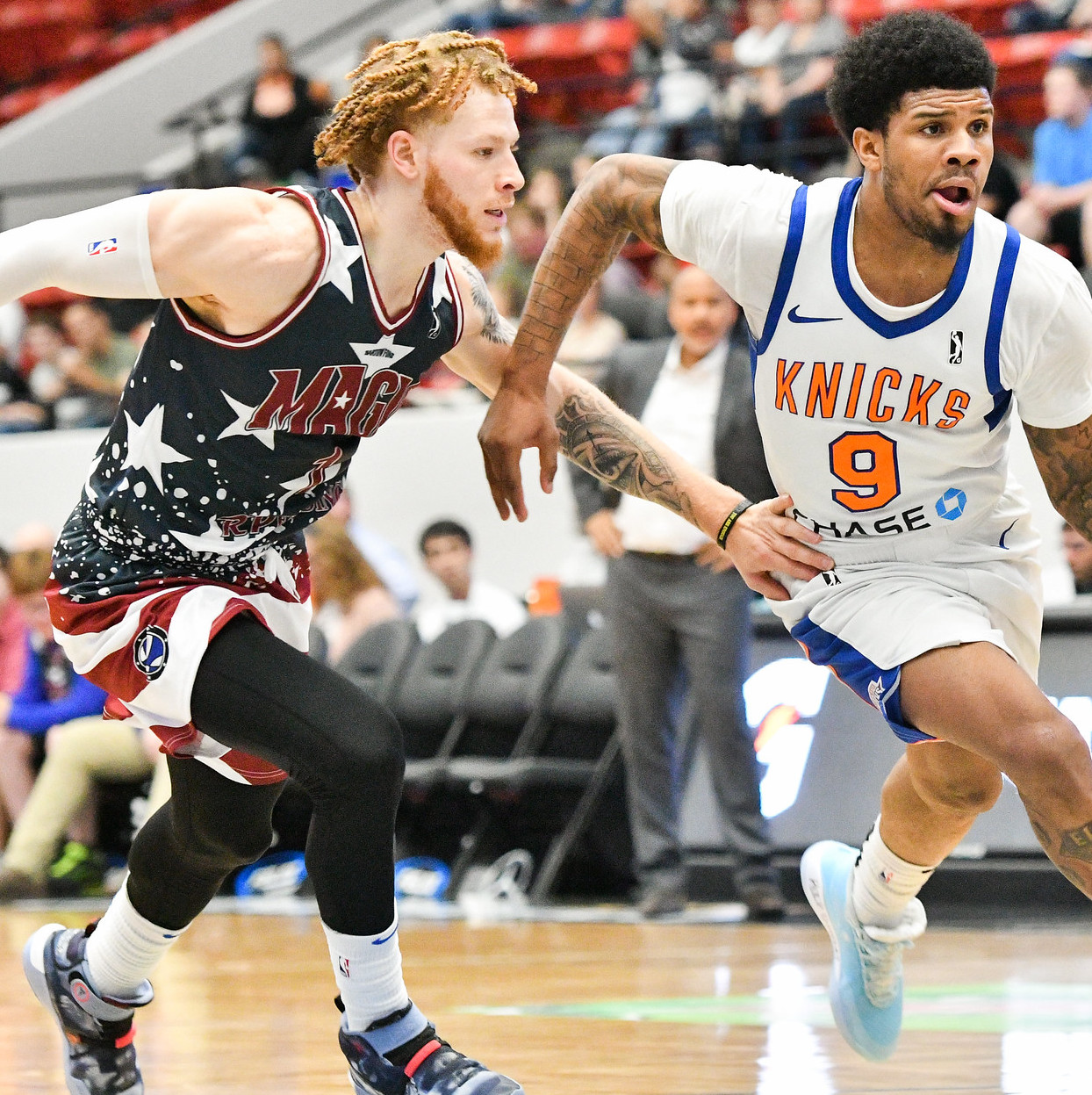
Gravett defending Lamar Peters of the Westchester Knicks

=== Lakeland Magic (2019–2020) ===
Prior to the 2019 NBA draft, Gravett worked out with the Cleveland Cavaliers and Charlotte Hornets and attended the Pro Basketball Combine. Gravett was signed by the Orlando Magic on August 13, 2019. Davis was assigned to the Magic's G League affiliate, the Lakeland Magic. Gravett had 21 points, four rebounds, four assists and two steals in a loss to the Long Island Nets on December 15. On January 7, he had his first double-double with 21 points and 11 rebounds in a loss to the College Park Skyhawks. Gravett averaged 11.7 points, 4.1 rebounds and 3.4 assists for the Lakeland Magic, shooting 43 percent from the field and including 38.6 percent from behind the arc.

=== MZT Skopje Aerodrom (2020–2021) ===
On July 31, 2020, Gravett signed with MZT Skopje of the Macedonian League. He averaged 12.4 points, 4.0 rebounds, 3.1 assists and 1.2 steals per game. Gravett helped the team win the Macedonian League championship as well as the 2021 Macedonian Basketball Cup.

=== Return to Lakeland (2021) ===
On September 8, 2021, Gravett signed with the Orlando Magic. However, he was waived on October 16. Gravett subsequently rejoined the Lakeland Magic where he played 12 games and averaged 13.6 points, 5.2 rebounds, 2.8 assists and 1.83 steals in 34.5 minutes.

=== Orlando Magic (2021–2022) ===
On December 17, 2021, Gravett signed a 10-day contract with the Orlando Magic. He signed a second 10-day contract with the team on December 27.

=== Third stint with Lakeland (2022) ===
On January 7, 2022, Gravett was reacquired by the Lakeland Magic.

=== Memphis Hustle (2022) ===
On August 25, 2022, Gravett was traded to the Windy City Bulls, and on October 21, he was again traded to the Memphis Hustle. On November 4, Gravett was named to the opening night roster for the Hustle. On November 16, he was waived after appearing in 3 games.

=== Raptors 905 (2022–2023) ===
On November 26, 2022, Gravett was acquired by the Raptors 905. On January 25, 2023, Gravett was waived.

=== EWE Baskets Oldenburg (2023) ===
On February 11, 2023, Gravett signed with Baskets Oldenburg of the Basketball Bundesliga.

=== Śląsk Wrocław (2023–2024) ===
On July 18, 2023, Gravett signed with Śląsk Wrocław of the PLK.

=== Indios de San Francisco de Macorís (2024) ===
On June 29, 2024, Gravett signed with the Indios de San Francisco de Macorís of the Liga Nacional de Baloncesto.

=== Sabah (2024–2026) ===
On July 8, 2024, he signed with Sabah of the Azerbaijan Basketball League.

=== Pallacanestro Cantù (2026–present) ===
On July 16, 2026, Gravett signed with Pallacanestro Cantù of the Italian Lega Basket Serie A (LBA).

== Career statistics ==
Legend
GP	Games played	GS	Games started	MPG	Minutes per game
FG%	Field goal percentage	3P%	3-point field goal percentage	FT%	Free throw percentage
RPG	Rebounds per game	APG	Assists per game	SPG	Steals per game
BPG	Blocks per game	PPG	Points per game	**Bold**	Career high

=== NBA ===
Year	Team	GP	GS	MPG	FG%	3P%	FT%	RPG	APG	SPG	BPG	PPG
2021–22	Orlando	8	3	21.4	.474	.423	.750	2.6	2.5	.6	.1	6.3
Career		8	3	21.4	.474	.423	.750	2.6	2.5	.6	.1	6.3

=== College ===
Year	Team	GP	GS	MPG	FG%	3P%	FT%	RPG	APG	SPG	BPG	PPG
2016–17	South Carolina	**35**	3	17.0	.293	.217	.645	1.6	1.4	.4	.0	3.2
2017–18	South Carolina	30	**22**	25.9	.399	.322	.688	3.6	**3.6**	.4	.2	7.4
2018–19	South Carolina	32	5	**29.6**	**.418**	**.399**	**.767**	**3.8**	2.4	**.8**	**.3**	**11.4**
Career		97	30	23.9	.385	.339	.714	3.0	2.4	.5	.2	7.2
