= Shane Hunter =

American/Israeli basketball player (born 2001)

- Hunter with Maccabi Tel Aviv in 2026

No. 40 – Maccabi Tel Aviv
- Position: Power forward / center
- League: Israeli Premier League; EuroLeague

Personal information
- Born: June 27, 2001 (age 25) Fort Lauderdale, Florida, U.S.
- Listed height: 6 ft 10 in (2.08 m)
- Listed weight: 210 lb (95 kg)

Career information
- High school: St. Thomas Aquinas (Fort Lauderdale, Florida)
- College: Nova Southeastern (2019–2024)
- NBA draft: 2024: undrafted
- Playing career: 2024–present

Career history
- 2024–2025: Norrköping Dolphins
- 2025–present: Maccabi Tel Aviv
- 2025–2026: →Legia Warsaw

Career highlights
- PLK champion (2026); SBL champion (2025); SBL champion (2025); SBL Finals MVP (2025)

Shane Hunter (born June 27, 2001) is an American and Israeli professional basketball player for Maccabi Tel Aviv of the Israeli Premier League and the EuroLeague.

== College career ==
Hunter played college ball for Nova Southeastern. In his last season Hunter averaged 15.9 points, 6.7 rebounds, 1.7 assists, 1.3 steals and 2.0 blocks per game. Hunter was named Sunshine State All-First Team, Sunshine State All-Defensive Team, Sunshine State Conference All-Tournament Team and Sunshine State Conference Tournament MVP.

== Professional career ==
After graduating from college, Hunter signed with the Norrköping Dolphins of the Swedish Basketball League. He won the League title and was named Finals MVP.

On July 27, 2025, Hunter signed a three-year deal with Euroleague team Maccabi Tel Aviv. He was immediately loaned out to Polish champions Legia Warsaw.
