= Zahir Porter =

American basketball player

No. 0 – Wilki Morskie Szczecin
- Position: Shooting guard
- League: PLK

Personal information
- Born: January 11, 2000 (age 26) Bronx, New York, U.S.
- Listed height: 6 ft 6 in (1.98 m)
- Listed weight: 180 lb (82 kg)

Career information
- High school: Our Saviour Lutheran School (Bronx, New York)
- College: New York Institute of Technology (2018–2019); Independence Community College (2019–2020); Weber State University (2020–2023)
- NBA draft: 2023: undrafted
- Playing career: 2023–present

Career history
- 2023–2024: Kamza Basket
- 2024: BK Iskra Svit
- 2024–2025: Vitória
- 2025–2026: VEF Rīga
- 2026: Hapoel Galil Elyon
- 2026–present: Wilki Morskie Szczecin

Zahir Christian Porter (born January 11, 2000) is an American professional basketball player for Wilki Morskie Szczecin of the Polish Basketball League (PLK). He played college basketball for the Weber State Wildcats.

== Early life and high school ==
Porter attended Our Saviour Lutheran School in Bronx, NY where he averaged 14.6 points per game as a senior. He played three seasons of varsity basketball.

== College career ==
In 2018, Porter committed to New York Institute of Technology. He averaged 12.2 points and 2.9 rebounds per game.

In 2019, Porter transferred to Independence Community College. He averaged 10.1 points and 3 rebounds per game.

In April 2020, Porter transferred to Weber State University.

During the 2020–2021 season, he played in 22 games and started in 21 games. He finished third on the team in scoring at 12 points per game.

During the 2021–2022 season, he played in all 33 games. He averaged 5.8 points.

In his final season, he played in all 33 games as a senior. He averaged 6 points per game.

== Professional career ==
=== Kamza (2023–2024) ===
On October 9, 2023, Porter signed with BC Kamza Basket for the season.

On November 7, 2023, Porter received Hoops Agents Player of the Week award for Round 5. He had 57 points, 4 rebounds and 5 assists for his team's win.

=== BK Iskra Svit (2024) ===
On August 14, 2024, Porter signed with BK Iskra Svit for the season. On October 24, 2024, Porter left the team after playing in 5 games where he averaged 21.6 points, 3.8 rebounds and 2.8 assists per game.

=== Wilki Morskie Szczecin (2026–present) ===
On July 15, 2026, he signed with Wilki Morskie Szczecin of the Polish Basketball League (PLK).

== Personal life ==
Porter is the son of Erin Porter and Yolanda Roberson. He has two siblings, Zion and Ari.
