= Keith Jordan =

American politician

Member of the Tennessee Senate from the 23rd district
- In office January 8, 1991 – January 12, 1999
- Preceded by: William Allen Richardson Jr.
- Succeeded by: Marsha Blackburn

Personal details
- Born: November 24, 1950 (age 75) West Point, New York
- Party: Republican

Keith Jordan (born November 24, 1950) is an American politician who served in the Tennessee Senate from the 23rd district from 1991 to 1999.
