= Shevon Thompson =

Jamaican basketball player

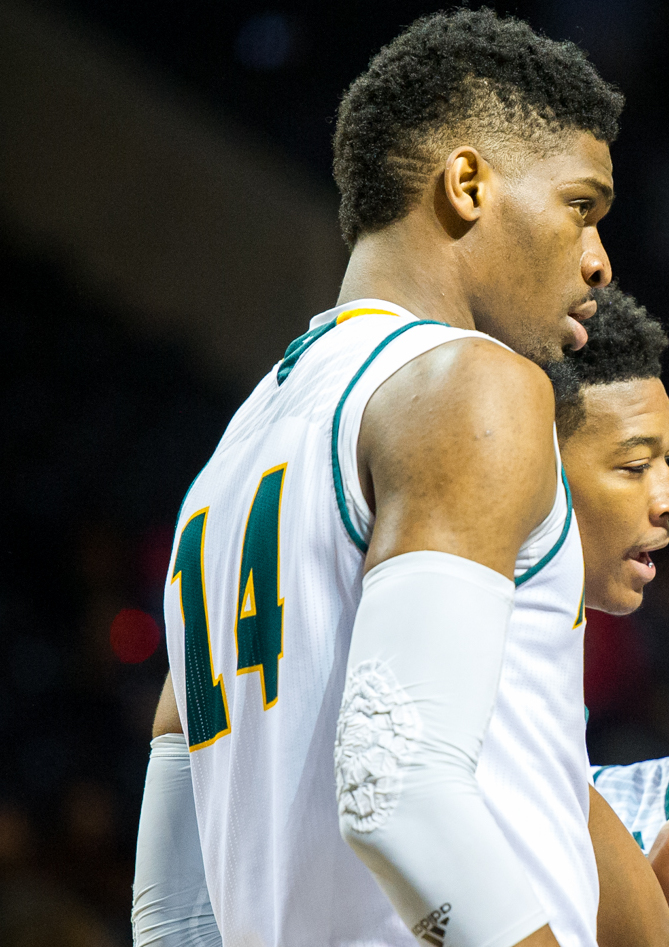
- Thompson playing for George Mason in 2016

No. 21 – JDA Dijon
- Position: Center
- League: LNB Élite

Personal information
- Born: June 10, 1993 (age 33) Clarendon Parish, Jamaica
- Listed height: 7 ft 0 in (2.13 m)
- Listed weight: 225 lb (102 kg)

Career information
- High school: Vere Technical (Clarendon, Jamaica)
- College: Midland (2012–2013); Harcum (2013–2014); George Mason (2014–2016)
- NBA draft: 2016: undrafted
- Playing career: 2016–present

Career history
- 2016–2017: Erie BayHawks
- 2017–2018: Raptors 905
- 2018: İstanbul BB
- 2018–2019: Wisconsin Herd
- 2019–2020: Oostende
- 2020: Alba Berlin
- 2020–2021: Fuenlabrada
- 2021: Brose Bamberg
- 2021–2022: Agua Caliente Clippers
- 2022–2023: Fos Provence
- 2023–2025: SLUC Nancy
- 2025–2026: Spartak Subotica
- 2026–present: JDA Dijon

Career highlights
- All-LNB Élite First Team (2025); All-LNB Élite Second Team (2024); 2× Belgian League champion (2019, 2020); Serbian League champion (2026)

Shevon Thompson (born June 10, 1993) is a Jamaican professional basketball player for JDA Dijon of the LNB Élite. He played college basketball for Midland College, Harcum College, and George Mason.

== Early life ==
Thompson grew up playing soccer in Jamaica. He never played basketball until his junior year of high school, when a woman noticed his height and asked if he knew how to play. Thompson replied no, so the woman offered to teach him later. Thompson became more comfortable the more he played and began attracting attention in the United States.

== College career ==
Thompson began his college career at Midland College and played a season at Harcum College. He transferred to George Mason as a junior, selecting the Patriots over offers from Butler, Wichita State and Old Dominion partially because coach Paul Hewitt grew up in Jamaica. As a junior, he averaged 12.5 points and 10.9 rebounds per game. As a senior at George Mason, Thompson averaged 9.9 points and 10.6 rebounds per game. He was selected to play in the Reese's College All-Star Game.

== Professional career ==
Thompson was selected in the second round with the 33rd pick of the 2016 NBA Development League draft by the Erie BayHawks. He averaged 12.1 points and 7.5 rebounds in 17 games in his rookie season. On November 17, 2017, he was traded to Raptors 905 in exchange for Scott Suggs.

On August 5, 2018, Thompson signed with Istanbul BB of the Turkish Basketball Super League. On November 16, 2018, Istanbul BB parted ways with Thompson.

On December 20, 2018, the Wisconsin Herd acquired Thompson's returning rights from the Raptors 905, in exchange for MiKyle McIntosh and the returning rights to JeQuan Lewis. On December 28, 2018, the Herd added Thompson to the roster.

On March 25, 2019, Thompson signed with BC Oostende of the Pro Basketball League. He averaged 13.5 points and 10.1 rebounds per game. On September 8, 2020, Thompson signed a one-month deal with Alba Berlin. He parted ways with the team on October 13, after the team declined to sign him for the rest of the season.

On October 16, 2020, he has signed with Fuenlabrada of the Spanish Liga ACB.

On January 9, 2021, he signed with Brose Bamberg of the German Basketball Bundesliga (BBL).

He re-joined the G League for the 2021–22 season, making the roster of the Ontario Clippers.

On July 7, 2022, he has signed with Fos Provence Basket of the LNB Pro A.

On June 7, 2023, he signed with SLUC Nancy Basket of the LNB Pro A.

On July 22, 2025, he signed with Spartak Subotica of the Serbian League (KLS).

On August 7, 2026, he signed with JDA Dijon of the LNB Élite.
