= Sir'Jabari Rice =

American basketball player (born 1998)

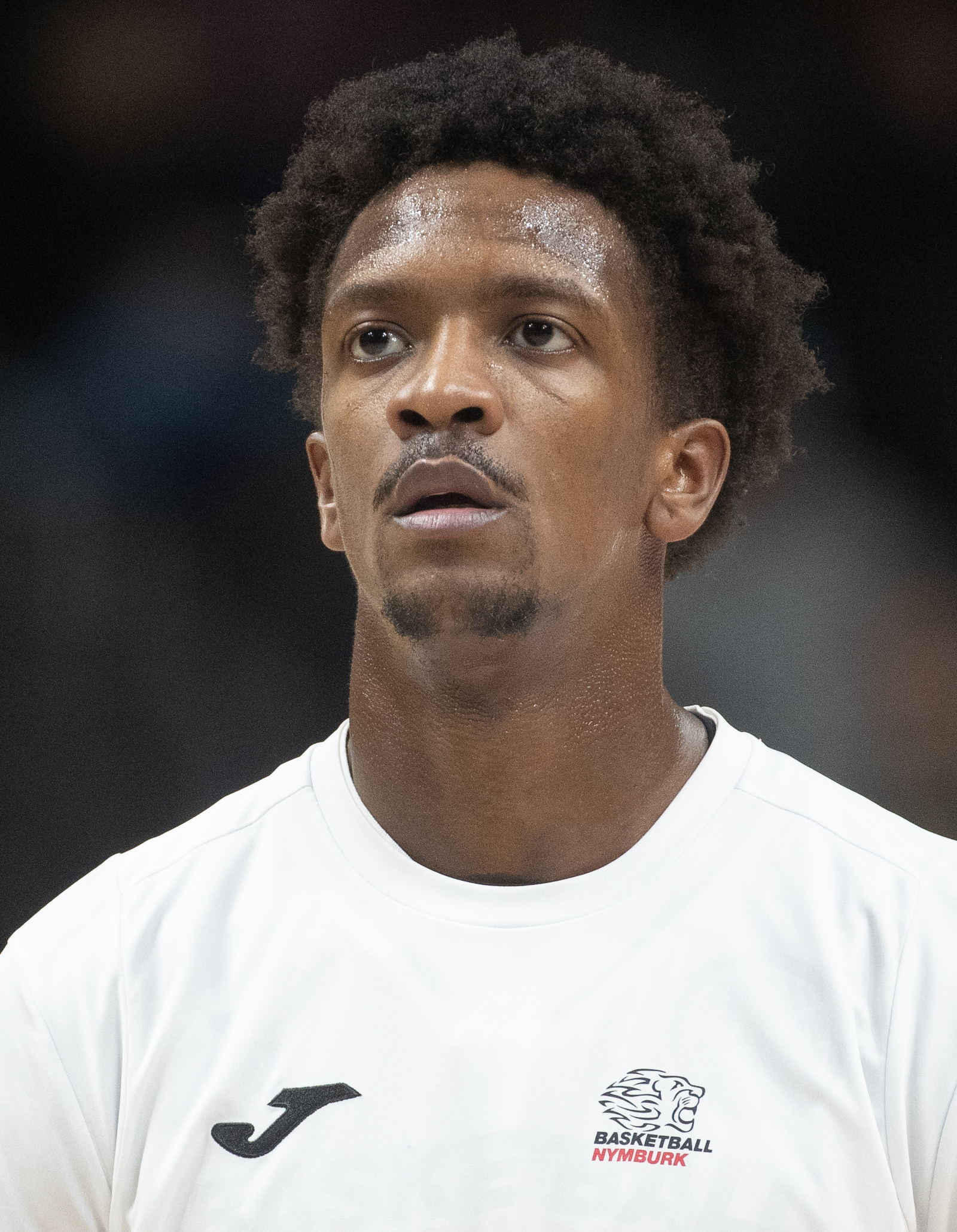
- Rice in 2025

No. 10 – Umana Reyer Venezia
- Position: Shooting guard
- League: LBA; EuroCup

Personal information
- Born: December 28, 1998 (age 27) Houston, Texas, U.S.
- Listed height: 6 ft 4 in (1.93 m)
- Listed weight: 180 lb (82 kg)

Career information
- High school: Thurgood Marshall (Missouri City, Texas)
- College: New Mexico State (2018–2022); Texas (2022–2023)
- NBA draft: 2023: undrafted
- Playing career: 2023–present

Career history
- 2023–2024: Austin Spurs
- 2024: Metros de Santiago
- 2024: Sioux Falls Skyforce
- 2024–2025: South Bay Lakers
- 2025–2026: ERA Nymburk
- 2026: MoraBanc Andorra
- 2026–present: Reyer Venezia

Career highlights
- First-team All-WAC (2020); Big 12 All-Newcomer Team (2023); 2× Second-team All-WAC (2021, 2022); Third-team All-Big 12 (2023); Big 12 Sixth Man of the Year (2023)
- Stats at NBA.com
- Stats at Basketball Reference

Sir'Jabari Prince Rice (born December 28, 1998) is an American professional basketball player for Reyer Venezia of the Italian Lega Basket Serie A (LBA) and the EuroCup. He played college basketball for the Texas Longhorns and New Mexico State Aggies. He has also previously played for the Austin Spurs and South Bay Lakers for the NBA G League.

== High school career ==
Rice grew up playing football and did not play organized basketball until his sophomore year in high school. He attended Thurgood Marshall High School in Missouri City, Texas, joining the varsity basketball team in his junior season, after a year at the junior varsity level. As a senior, Rice helped his team reach the Class 5A state title game. He committed to play college basketball for New Mexico State, with UMass being the only other program to offer him a scholarship.

== College career ==
Rice redshirted his first season with New Mexico State to build strength and improve his diet and skills. After coming off the bench as a freshman, he averaged 12.8 points and 5.1 rebounds per game and was named first-team All-Western Athletic Conference (WAC) in his sophomore season. As a junior, Rice averaged 13.2 points, 5.3 rebounds and 2.2 assists per game, earning second-team All-WAC honors. In his senior season, he averaged 11.9 points, 4.8 rebounds and 3.2 assists per game, repeating as a second-team All-WAC selection. Rice transferred to Texas as a graduate student. He was one of the team's key players despite mostly coming off the bench, and was named third-team All-Big 12 and Big 12 Sixth Man of the Year.

== Professional career ==
=== Austin Spurs (2023–2024) ===
After going undrafted in the 2023 NBA draft, Rice signed a two-way contract with the San Antonio Spurs on July 5, 2023. However, he was waived on December 14, after playing four games with the Austin Spurs. Two days later, he re-joined Austin. During the season with the Spurs, Rice averaged 10.2 points, 3.1 rebounds, and 3.0 assists per game in 22.1 minutes a game.

=== Metros de Santiago (2024) ===
On June 10, 2024, Rice signed with the Metros de Santiago of the Liga Nacional de Baloncesto.

=== Sioux Falls Skyforce (2024) ===
On October 28, 2024, Rice joined the Sioux Falls Skyforce. However, he was waived on November 27. In his short time with the Skyforce, Rice played 3 games. He averaged 3.3 points, 0.7 rebounds, and 1.1 assists per game in 10 minutes a game.

=== South Bay Lakers (2024–2025) ===
On December 3, 2024, Rice signed with the South Bay Lakers. Throughout the regular season, he played in 33 games, averaging 13.6 points, 1.8 rebounds, and 3.2 assists per game.

=== Basketball Nymburk (2025–2026) ===
On August 3, 2025, Rice signed with ERA Nymburk of the National Basketball League. He played 23 games, averaging 14.8 points, 3.6 rebounds, and 4.2 assists per game.

=== Andorra (2026) ===
On March 3, 2026, Rice signed with MoraBanc Andorra of the Liga ACB until the end of the season. He played 14 games, averaging 13.7 points, 3.8 rebounds, and 3.9 assists per game.

=== Reyer Venezia (2026–present) ===
On June 30, 2026, Rice signed with Reyer Venezia of the Lega Basket Serie A (LBA) for the upcoming 2026-27 season.

== Career statistics ==
Legend
| GP | Games played | GS | Games started | MPG | Minutes per game |
| FG% | Field goal percentage | 3P% | 3-point field goal percentage | FT% | Free throw percentage |
| RPG | Rebounds per game | APG | Assists per game | SPG | Steals per game |
| BPG | Blocks per game | PPG | Points per game | **Bold** | Career high |

=== Professional ===
| Year | Team | GP | GS | MPG | FG% | 3P% | FT% | RPG | APG | SPG | BPG | PPG |
|---|---|---|---|---|---|---|---|---|---|---|---|---|
| 2023-24 | Austin Spurs | 32 | 10 | 22.1 | .430 | .336 | .796 | 3.1 | 3.0 | 0.9 | 0.3 | 10.2 |
| 2024-25 | South Bay Lakers | 33 | - | 21.9 | .495 | .435 | .810 | 1.8 | 3.2 | 0.9 | 0.1 | 13.6 |
| 2025-26 | ERA Nymburk | 23 | 3 | 19.7 | .547 | .373 | .836 | 3.6 | 4.2 | 1.5 | 0.8 | 14.8 |
| 2025-26 | ERA Nymburk | 11 | 0 | 25.7 | .528 | .420 | .788 | 3.6 | 3.1 | 0.8 | 0.6 | 18.6 |
| 2025-26 | MoraBanc Andorra | 14 | 6 | 24.5 | .493 | .417 | .769 | 3.8 | 3.9 | 0.6 | 0.4 | 13.7 |

=== College ===
| Year | Team | GP | GS | MPG | FG% | 3P% | FT% | RPG | APG | SPG | BPG | PPG |
|---|---|---|---|---|---|---|---|---|---|---|---|---|
| 2018-19 | NMSU | 31 | 5 | 10.9 | .326 | .157 | .654 | 2.2 | 0.8 | 0.5 | 0.2 | 3.4 |
| 2019-20 | NMSU | 30 | 19 | 26.3 | .468 | **.388** | .827 | 5.1 | 1.9 | 0.8 | 0.2 | 12.8 |
| 2020-21 | NMSU | 18 | 18 | 30.2 | **.469** | .355 | .816 | **5.3** | 2.2 | 0.7 | **0.4** | **13.2** |
| 2021–22 | NMSU | 32 | **32** | **32.3** | .391 | .335 | .779 | 5.1 | **3.1** | 0.6 | 0.3 | 11.9 |
| 2022–23 | Texas | **38** | 3 | 25.3 | .464 | .371 | **.863** | 3.5 | 2.0 | **0.9** | 0.3 | 13.0 |
| Career | | 149 | 77 | 24.6 | .436 | .344 | .804 | 4.1 | 2.0 | 0.7 | 0.3 | 10.7 |
