= 2021–22 Grambling State Tigers men's basketball team =

American college basketball season

2021–22 Grambling State Tigers men's basketball
- Conference: Southwestern Athletic Conference
- West Division
- Record: 12–20 (9–9 SWAC)
- Head coach: Donte Jackson (5th season)
- Assistant coaches: Winston Hines; Kyle Jones; Eshaunte Jones
- Home arena: Fredrick C. Hobdy Assembly Center

2021–22 SWAC men's basketball standings
| | Conf. | | | | Overall |
| Team | W | | L | PCT | W | | L | PCT |
|---|---|---|---|---|---|---|---|---|
| Alcorn State | 14 | – | 4 | .778 | 17 | – | 17 | .500 |
| Texas Southern † | 13 | – | 5 | .722 | 19 | – | 13 | .594 |
| Southern | 12 | – | 6 | .667 | 17 | – | 14 | .548 |
| Florida A&M | 11 | – | 7 | .611 | 13 | – | 17 | .433 |
| Alabama A&M | 10 | – | 8 | .556 | 12 | – | 18 | .400 |
| Grambling State | 9 | – | 9 | .500 | 12 | – | 20 | .375 |
| Jackson State | 9 | – | 9 | .500 | 11 | – | 19 | .367 |
| Prairie View A&M | 8 | – | 10 | .444 | 8 | – | 19 | .296 |
| Alabama State | 8 | – | 10 | .444 | 9 | – | 21 | .300 |
| Bethune–Cookman | 7 | – | 11 | .389 | 9 | – | 21 | .300 |
| Arkansas–Pine Bluff | 5 | – | 13 | .278 | 7 | – | 24 | .226 |
| Mississippi Valley State | 2 | – | 16 | .111 | 2 | – | 26 | .071 |
† 2022 SWAC tournament winner

The 2021–22 Grambling State Tigers men's basketball team represented Grambling State University in the 2021–22 NCAA Division I men's basketball season. The Tigers, led by fifth-year head coach Donte Jackson, played their home games at the Fredrick C. Hobdy Assembly Center in Grambling, Louisiana as members of the Southwestern Athletic Conference (SWAC).

The Tigers finished the season 12–20, 9–9 in SWAC play, to finish in a tie for sixth place. In the SWAC tournament, they defeated Southern in the quarterfinals before losing to second-seeded Texas Southern in the semifinals.

== Previous season ==
The Tigers finished the 2020–21 season 11–11, 9–6 in SWAC play, to finish in fourth place. In the SWAC tournament, they defeated Southern in the quarterfinals, before falling to top-seeded Prairie View A&M in the semifinals.

== Roster ==
2021–22 Grambling State Tigers men's basketball team
Players
Coaches

| Pos. | # | Name | Height | Weight | Year | Hometown |
|---|---|---|---|---|---|---|
| G | 0 | Chanse Robinson | 6 ft 1 in (1.85 m) | 175 lb (79 kg) | Fr | Grambling, LA |
| G | 1 | Cameron Christon | 6 ft 6 in (1.98 m) | 190 lb (86 kg) | RS Sr | Allen, TX |
| G | 2 | Zahad Munford | 6 ft 3 in (1.91 m) | 170 lb (77 kg) | Jr | Dallas, TX |
| G | 3 | Danya Kingsby | 6 ft 1 in (1.85 m) | 175 lb (79 kg) | GS | Milwaukee, WI |
| G | 5 | Tra'Michael Moton | 6 ft 1 in (1.85 m) | 170 lb (77 kg) | Jr | Shreveport, LA |
| G | 10 | Shawndarius Cowart | 6 ft 3 in (1.91 m) | 180 lb (82 kg) | Jr | Pensacola, FL |
| F | 11 | A'Mari McCray | 6 ft 10 in (2.08 m) | 260 lb (118 kg) | GS | Ruston, LA |
| G | 12 | Eric Parrish | 6 ft 6 in (1.98 m) | 195 lb (88 kg) | GS | Cypress, TX |
| F | 14 | AJ Taylor | 6 ft 8 in (2.03 m) | 210 lb (95 kg) | Jr | Davenport, IA |
| F | 21 | Terreon Randolph | 6 ft 8 in (2.03 m) | 220 lb (100 kg) | GS | Dallas, TX |
| G | 22 | Prince Moss | 6 ft 7 in (2.01 m) | 180 lb (82 kg) | GS | Bessemer, AL |
| G | 23 | Quintin Murrell | 6 ft 4 in (1.93 m) | 175 lb (79 kg) | Fr | Milwaukee, WI |
| G | 24 | Terrence Lewis | 6 ft 6 in (1.98 m) | 205 lb (93 kg) | Jr | Milwaukee, WI |
| G | 30 | Payton Parrish | 6 ft 0 in (1.83 m) | 180 lb (82 kg) | Fr | Milwaukee, WI |
| F | 32 | Malik Lamin | 6 ft 11 in (2.11 m) | 235 lb (107 kg) | RS Fr | Champlin, MN |
| G | 33 | Tyson Duncan | 6 ft 0 in (1.83 m) | 160 lb (73 kg) | So | Atlanta, GA |

Head coach

- Donte Jackson (Central State)

Assistant coach(es)

- Winston Hines (Stillman)
- Kyle Jones (Arkansas–Pine Bluff)
- Eshaunte Jones (Northern Kentucky)

Legend

- (C) Team captain
- (S) Suspended
- (I) Ineligible
- (W) Walk-on
- Injured
- Current redshirt

Roster
Last update: December 6, 2021

== Schedule and results ==
| Date time, TV | Rank^{#} | Opponent^{#} | Result | Record | High points | High rebounds | High assists | Site (attendance) city, state |
Non-conference regular season
| November 9, 2021*; 8:00 p.m. | | at Grand Canyon | L 53–74 | 0–1 | 10 – 2 tied | 6 – Lamin | 3 – Moton | GCU Arena (7,145); Phoenix, AZ |
| November 12, 2021*; 7:00 p.m., Big 12 Now | | at Texas Tech | L 62–88 | 0–2 | 22 – Kingsby | 5 – Cowart | 3 – Moton | United Supermarkets Arena (14,171); Lubbock, TX |
| November 15, 2021*; 8:00 p.m. | | at New Mexico | L 61–86 | 0–3 | 20 – Kingsby | 9 – Lamin | 4 – Moton | The Pit (8,010); Albuquerque, NM |
| November 21, 2021*; 5:00 p.m., Big 12 Now | | at Iowa State | L 47–82 | 0–4 | 12 – Taylor | 8 – Christon | 3 – Moton | Hilton Coliseum (10,533); Ames, IA |
| November 24, 2021*; 12:00 p.m. | | Louisiana Christian | W 71–61 | 1–4 | 21 – Christon | 11 – Christon | 5 – 2 tied | Fredrick C. Hobdy Assembly Center (231); Grambling, LA |
| November 28, 2021*; 9:30 p.m., ESPNU | | vs. Morgan State; HBCU Challenge hosted by Chris Paul | W 74–59 | 2–4 | 24 – Christon | 9 – Taylor | 4 – Moton | Footprint Center (2,103); Phoenix, AZ |
| November 29, 2021*; 5:00 p.m., ESPNU | | vs. Norfolk State; HBCU Challenge hosted by Chris Paul | L 63–70 | 2–5 | 16 – Taylor | 14 – Taylor | 4 – Moton | Footprint Center (720); Phoenix, AZ |
| December 2, 2021*; 6:00 p.m. | | Jarvis Christian | W 71–44 | 3–5 | 17 – Moton | 5 – 4 tied | 6 – Moton | Fredrick C. Hobdy Assembly Center (781); Grambling, LA |
| December 4, 2021*; 3:00 p.m., FS2 | | at No. 17 UConn | L 59–88 | 3–6 | 18 – Christon | 10 – Taylor | 3 – 3 tied | Harry A. Gampel Pavilion (9,159); Storrs, CT |
| December 11, 2021*; 2:30 p.m. | | at Incarnate Word | L 62–72 | 3–7 | 20 – Kingsby | 13 – Taylor | 3 – Moton | McDermott Center (227); San Antonio, TX |
| December 14, 2021*; 6:30 p.m., ESPN+ | | at UAB | L 61–79 | 3–8 | 17 – Cowart | 9 – Parrish | 2 – Moss | Bartow Arena (2,543); Birmingham, AL |
| December 18, 2021*; 1:00 p.m., ESPN+ | | at Tulane | Canceled due to COVID-19 protocols | | | | | Devlin Fieldhouse; New Orleans, LA |
| December 21, 2021*; 7:00 p.m., Big 12 Now | | at TCU | L 55–90 | 3–9 | 16 – Moton | 4 – Moton | 3 – Moton | Schollmaier Arena (4,920); Fort Worth, TX |
| December 28, 2021*; 7:00 p.m., ESPN3 | | at Southern Illinois | L 64–75 | 3–10 | – | – | – | Banterra Center (4,026); Carbondale, IL |
SWAC regular season
| January 3, 2022; 7:30 p.m. | | Prairie View A&M | W 2–0 (Forfeit) | 3–10 (1–0) | – | – | – | Fredrick C. Hobdy Assembly Center; Grambling, LA |
| January 5, 2022; 7:30 p.m. | | Texas Southern | L 61–67 | 3–11 (1–1) | 13 – McCray | 10 – Taylor | 5 – 2 tied | Fredrick C. Hobdy Assembly Center (486); Grambling, LA |
| January 8, 2022; 5:30 p.m. | | at Bethune–Cookman | W 68–66 | 4–11 (2–1) | 24 – Moton | 8 – 2 tied | 4 – Moton | Moore Gymnasium (234); Daytona Beach, FL |
| January 10, 2022; 7:30 p.m. | | at Florida A&M | L 66–75 | 4–12 (2–2) | 18 – Moton | 6 – Taylor | 4 – Moton | Al Lawson Center (1,687); Tallahassee, FL |
| January 15, 2022; 7:00 p.m. | | Southern | W 83–77 | 5–12 (3–2) | 23 – Christon | 7 – Moss | 4 – Moss | Fredrick C. Hobdy Assembly Center (5,079); Grambling, LA |
| January 22, 2022; 2:30 p.m. | | Mississippi Valley State | W 68–64 | 6–12 (4–2) | 17 – Parrish | 12 – Parrish | 4 – Moton | Fredrick C. Hobdy Assembly Center (1,713); Grambling, LA |
| January 24, 2022; 7:30 p.m. | | Arkansas–Pine Bluff | W 76–65 | 7–12 (5–2) | 23 – Cowart | 8 – Parrish | 6 – Cowart | Fredrick C. Hobdy Assembly Center (2,137); Grambling, LA |
| January 29, 2022; 5:00 p.m. | | vs. Jackson State; Bridge Builder Classic | W 73–64 | 8–12 (6–2) | 22 – Christon | 9 – Lamin | 5 – Moton | Mitchell Center (1,917); Mobile, AL |
| January 31, 2022; 7:30 p.m. | | at Alcorn State | W 80–73 | 9–12 (7–2) | 25 – Christon | 10 – Parrish | 5 – Moton | Davey Whitney Complex (1,191); Lorman, MS |
| February 5, 2022; 2:30 p.m. | | Alabama State | L 72–80 | 9–13 (7–3) | 19 – Cowart | 9 – Randolph | 7 – Cowart | Fredrick C. Hobdy Assembly Center (2,191); Grambling, LA |
| February 7, 2022; 8:00 p.m., ESPNU | | Alabama A&M | W 58–50 | 10–13 (8–3) | 12 – Christon | 10 – Parrish | 3 – 2 tied | Fredrick C. Hobdy Assembly Center (3,271); Grambling, LA |
| February 12, 2022; 3:30 p.m., NBA TV | | at Texas Southern | L 65–68 | 10–14 (8–4) | 14 – Christon | 8 – Cowart | 3 – Cowart | H&PE Arena (6,034); Houston, TX |
| February 14, 2022; 7:00 p.m. | | at Prairie View A&M | L 70–71 | 10–15 (8–5) | 20 – Cowart | 8 – Taylor | 5 – Moton | William Nicks Building (794); Prairie View, TX |
| February 19, 2022; 4:30 p.m. | | at Southern | W 61–57 | 11–15 (9–5) | 14 – Moton | 10 – Cowart | 4 – Moton | F. G. Clark Center (7,359); Baton Rouge, LA |
| February 26, 2022; 2:30 p.m. | | Florida A&M | L 73–79 | 11–16 (9–6) | 16 – Moss | 9 – Moton | 7 – Moton | Fredrick C. Hobdy Assembly Center (2,971); Grambling, LA |
| February 28, 2022; 7:30 p.m. | | Bethune–Cookman | L 63–69 | 11–17 (9–7) | 18 – Christon | 14 – McCray | 4 – Moton | Fredrick C. Hobdy Assembly Center (1,219); Grambling, LA |
| March 3, 2022; 7:30 p.m. | | at Alabama A&M | L 63–71 | 11–18 (9–8) | 18 – Munford | 8 – Lamin | 5 – Cowart | Elmore Gymnasium (856); Normal, AL |
| March 5, 2022; 4:30 p.m. | | at Alabama State | L 75–78 | 11–19 (9–9) | 21 – Christon | 9 – Lamin | 3 – Christon | Dunn–Oliver Acadome (1,201); Montgomery, AL |
SWAC tournament
| March 10, 2022; 2:00 p.m., ESPN+ | (6) | vs. (3) Southern; Quarterfinals | W 60–58 | 12–19 | 12 – Moton | 11 – Moton | 9 – Moton | Bartow Arena (333); Birmingham, AL |
| March 11, 2022; 2:00 p.m., ESPN+ | (6) | vs. (2) Texas Southern; Semifinals | L 54–73 | 12–20 | 20 – Cowart | 7 – Cowart | 2 – Moton | Bartow Arena (444); Birmingham, AL |
*Non-conference game. ^{#}Rankings from AP poll. (#) Tournament seedings in parentheses. All times are in Central.
