= 2021–22 Southern Jaguars basketball team =

American college basketball season

2021–22 Southern Jaguars basketball
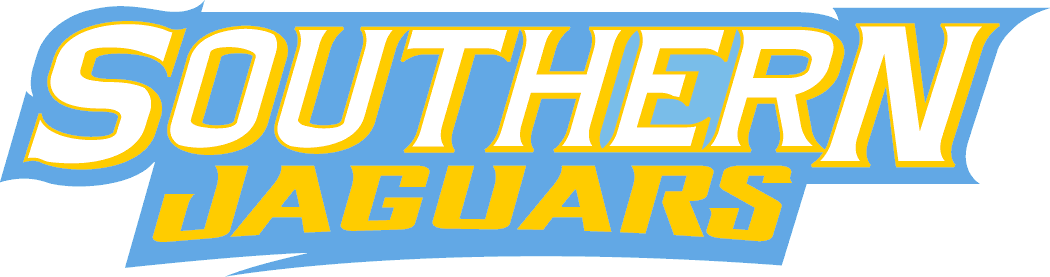
- Conference: Southwestern Athletic Conference
- Record: 17–14 (12–6 SWAC)
- Head coach: Sean Woods (4th season)
- Assistant coaches: Ryan Price; Pedro Cipriano; Jethro Hillman
- Home arena: F. G. Clark Center

2021–22 SWAC men's basketball standings
	Conf.				Overall
Team	W		L	PCT	W		L	PCT
Alcorn State	14	–	4	.778	17	–	17	.500
Texas Southern †	13	–	5	.722	19	–	13	.594
Southern	12	–	6	.667	17	–	14	.548
Florida A&M	11	–	7	.611	13	–	17	.433
Alabama A&M	10	–	8	.556	12	–	18	.400
Grambling State	9	–	9	.500	12	–	20	.375
Jackson State	9	–	9	.500	11	–	19	.367
Prairie View A&M	8	–	10	.444	8	–	19	.296
Alabama State	8	–	10	.444	9	–	21	.300
Bethune–Cookman	7	–	11	.389	9	–	21	.300
Arkansas–Pine Bluff	5	–	13	.278	7	–	24	.226
Mississippi Valley State	2	–	16	.111	2	–	26	.071
† 2022 SWAC tournament winner

The 2021–22 Southern Jaguars basketball team represented Southern University in the 2021–22 NCAA Division I men's basketball season. The Jaguars, led by fourth-year head coach Sean Woods, played their home games at the F. G. Clark Center in Baton Rouge, Louisiana as members of the Southwestern Athletic Conference.

== Previous season ==
The Jaguars finished the 2020–21 season 8–11 overall, 8–6 in SWAC play, to finish in 5th place. In the SWAC tournament, they were defeated by Grambling State in the quarterfinals.

== Roster ==
2021–22 Southern Jaguars men's basketball team
Players
Coaches

Pos.	#	Name	Height	Weight	Year	Hometown
F	0	Terrell Williams, Jr	6 ft 6 in (1.98 m)	200 lb (91 kg)	RS So	Arlington, Texas
G	1	Ahsante Shivers	6 ft 4 in (1.93 m)	205 lb (93 kg)	RS Sr	Seat Pleasant, Maryland
F	2	J'Quan Ewing	6 ft 9 in (2.06 m)	195 lb (88 kg)	Fr	Clarksville, Tennessee
G	3	P.J. Byrd	6 ft 1 in (1.85 m)	175 lb (79 kg)	Jr	Houston, Texas
G	4	Isaiah Rollins	6 ft 3 in (1.91 m)	185 lb (84 kg)	Sr	Opelousas, Louisiana
G	5	Jayden Saddler	6 ft 1 in (1.85 m)	195 lb (88 kg)	Sr	Aberdeen, Maryland
G/F	10	Delor Johnson	6 ft 3 in (1.91 m)	195 lb (88 kg)	Jr	Houston, Texas
G	11	DeSean Woods	6 ft 0 in (1.83 m)	165 lb (75 kg)	So	Lexington, Kentucky
F/C	12	Damien Sears	6 ft 7 in (2.01 m)	245 lb (111 kg)	RS Sr	Haughton, Louisiana
G	13	Dre'Shawn Allen	6 ft 1 in (1.85 m)	170 lb (77 kg)	Jr	Auburn Hills, Michigan
G	14	Jason Holliday	6 ft 5 in (1.96 m)	205 lb (93 kg)	RS Sr	Baton Rouge, Louisiana
G	20	Gavin Harris	6 ft 2 in (1.88 m)	155 lb (70 kg)	RS Fr	Gonzales, Louisiana
G	22	Brion Whitley	6 ft 4 in (1.93 m)	200 lb (91 kg)	RS Jr	Sarasota, Florida
C	23	Kirk Parker	6 ft 7 in (2.01 m)	245 lb (111 kg)	RS Sr	Vicksburg, Mississippi
G	25	Da'Tayvious Gabriel	6 ft 4 in (1.93 m)	160 lb (73 kg)	Fr	St. Martinville, Louisiana
G	30	Brendon Brooks	5 ft 10 in (1.78 m)	165 lb (75 kg)	RS Sr	Dallas, Texas
F	33	Gavin Flowers	6 ft 7 in (2.01 m)	200 lb (91 kg)	Fr	East Orange, New Jersey
G/F	35	Tyrone Lyons	6 ft 7 in (2.01 m)	190 lb (86 kg)	RS Jr	North Amityville, New York

Head coach

- Sean Woods (Kentucky)

Assistant coach(es)

- Ryan Price (Henderson State)
- Pedro Cipriano (Southern)
- Jethro Hillman (Miami (FL))

Legend

- (C) Team captain
- (S) Suspended
- (I) Ineligible
- (W) Walk-on
- Injured
- Current redshirt

Roster
Last update: January 4, 2022

== Schedule and results ==
Date time, TV	Rank^{#}	Opponent^{#}	Result	Record	High points	High rebounds	High assists	Site (attendance) city, state
Non-conference regular season
November 9, 2021*; 8:00 pm, ACCNX		at Louisville	L 60–72	0–1	17 – Whitley	14 – Sears	4 – Saddler	KFC Yum! Center (12,643); Louisville, KY
November 13, 2021*; 11:30 am, ESPN+		at Tulane	W 73–70	1–1	13 – Saddler	8 – Sears	11 – Saddler	Devlin Fieldhouse (1,043); New Orleans, LA
November 16, 2021*; 7:00 pm		at Rice	L 63–81	1–2	19 – Lyons	6 – Lyons	4 – Saddler	Tudor Fieldhouse (1,565); Houston, TX
November 19, 2021*; 7:00 pm		at South Dakota	L 68–71	1–3	19 – Saddler	6 – Sears	4 – Saddler	Sanford Coyote Sports Center (1,130); Vermillion, SD
November 21, 2021*; 7:00 pm, ESPNU		at Nebraska; Nebraska MTE	L 59–82	1–4	17 – Whitley	5 – 3 Tied	6 – Byrd	Pinnacle Bank Arena (15,255); Lincoln, NE
November 23, 2021*; 7:00 pm		Ecclesia	W 109–53	2–4	29 – Whitley	6 – 4 Tied	7 – Lyons	F. G. Clark Center (875); Baton Rouge, LA
November 28, 2021*; 2:00 pm, ESPN+		at Tennessee State	W 82–80	3–4	19 – Williams Jr.	5 – Sears	4 – Byrd	Gentry Complex (1,452); Nashville, TN
December 4, 2021*; 7:00 pm, ESPN+		at Akron	L 62–79	3–5	13 – Lyons	7 – Rollins	3 – Saddler	James A. Rhodes Arena (1,690); Akron, OH
December 7, 2021*; 7:00 pm, SECN		at No. 10 Kentucky	L 64–76	3–6	18 – Saddler	6 – Ewing	6 – Saddler	Rupp Arena (18,947); Lexington, KY
December 9, 2021*; 7:00 pm		Lindsey Wilson	W 86–68	4–6	16 – Williams Jr.	5 – 3 Tied	4 – Williams Jr.	F. G. Clark Center (476); Baton Rouge, LA
December 11, 2021*; 5:30 pm		Southeastern Louisiana	W 72–66	5–6	19 – Lyons	9 – Sears	4 – Byrd	F. G. Clark Center (1,725); Baton Rouge, LA
December 19, 2021*; 4:30 pm, ESPN3		at Kent State	W 78–76	6–6	17 – 2 Tied	4 – Lyons	6 – Saddler	MAC Center (1,234); Kent, OH
December 21, 2021*; 6:00 pm, ESPN3		at Dayton	L 60–69	6–7	14 – Whitley	5 – Lyons	6 – 2 Tied	UD Arena (13,407); Dayton, OH
SWAC regular season
January 3, 2022; 7:30 pm		Texas Southern	W 63–50	7–7 (1–0)	15 – Whitley	7 – Sears	7 – Byrd	F. G. Clark Center (2,675); Baton Rouge, LA
January 5, 2022; 7:30 pm		Prairie View A&M	W 2–0 (Forfeit)	7–7 (2–0)	–	–	–	F. G. Clark Center; Baton Rouge, LA
January 8, 2022; 4:00 pm		at Florida A&M	W 80–66	8–7 (3–0)	14 – Saddler	7 – Saddler	5 – Saddler	Al Lawson Center; Tallahassee, FL
January 10, 2022; 7:30 pm		at Bethune–Cookman	W 69–59	9–7 (4–0)	20 – Saddler	9 – Saddler	5 – Saddler	Moore Gymnasium (318); Daytona Beach, FL
January 15, 2022; 5:00 pm		at Grambling State	L 77–83	9–8 (4–1)	25 – Lyons	5 – Sears	6 – Byrd	Fredrick C. Hobdy Assembly Center (5,079); Grambling, LA
January 22, 2022; 5:00 pm		Arkansas–Pine Bluff	W 99–51	10–8 (5–1)	21 – Williams Jr.	7 – Williams Jr.	7 – Brooks	F. G. Clark Center (3,274); Baton Rouge, LA
January 24, 2022; 7:30 pm		Mississippi Valley State	W 100–72	11–8 (6–1)	21 – Saddler	7 – Whitley	8 – Byrd	F. G. Clark Center (3,879); Baton Rouge, LA
January 29, 2022; 5:00 pm		at Alcorn State	L 64–68	11–9 (6–2)	18 – Saddler	3 – 5 Tied	6 – Saddler	Davey Whitney Complex (650); Lorman, MS
January 31, 2022; 7:30 pm		at Jackson State	W 75–64	12–9 (7–2)	18 – Whitley	9 – Sears	5 – 2 Tied	Williams Assembly Center (850); Jackson, MS
February 5, 2022; 5:00 pm		Alabama A&M	W 73–64	13–9 (8–2)	14 – Whitley	9 – Williams Jr.	6 – Byrd	F. G. Clark Center (4,155); Baton Rouge, LA
February 7, 2022; 7:30 pm		Alabama State	W 72–58	14–9 (9–2)	17 – Williams Jr.	13 – Lyons	5 – Saddler	F. G. Clark Center (4,989); Baton Rouge, LA
February 12, 2022; 5:30 pm		at Prairie View A&M	L 77–84	14–10 (9–3)	24 – Lyons	11 – Lyons	4 – Byrd	William Nicks Building (824); Prairie View, TX
February 14, 2022; 7:30 pm		at Texas Southern	W 70–58	15–10 (10–3)	18 – Lyons	5 – Sears	5 – Saddler	H&PE Arena (3,187); Houston, TX
February 19, 2022; 5:00 pm		Grambling State	L 57–61	15–11 (10–4)	12 – Lyons	16 – Sears	6 – Byrd	F. G. Clark Center (7,359); Baton Rouge, LA
February 26, 2022; 5:00 pm		Bethune–Cookman	L 84–87 ^{OT}	15–12 (10–5)	26 – Whitley	6 – Sears	11 – Saddler	F. G. Clark Center (2,139); Baton Rouge, LA
February 28, 2022; 5:30 pm		Florida A&M	W 58–49	16–12 (11–5)	15 – Saddler	9 – Holliday	7 – Saddler	F. G. Clark Center (4,128); Baton Rouge, LA
March 3, 2022; 8:00 pm		at Alabama State	L 67–77	16–13 (11–6)	21 – Lyons	10 – Lyons	1 – Tied	Dunn–Oliver Acadome (1,098); Montgomery, AL
March 5, 2022; 6:30 pm		at Alabama A&M	W 50–49	17–13 (12–6)	13 – Saddler	8 – Williams	2 – Sears	Elmore Gymnasium (998); Normal, AL
SWAC tournament
March 10, 2022; 2:00 pm, ESPN+	(3)	vs. (6) Grambling State; Quarterfinals	L 58–60	17–14	13 – Lyons	8 – Lyons	7 – Saddler	Bartow Arena (333); Birmingham, AL
*Non-conference game. ^{#}Rankings from AP Poll. (#) Tournament seedings in parentheses. All times are in Central.
