= 2021–22 Florida A&M Rattlers basketball team =

American college basketball season

2021–22 Florida A&M Rattlers basketball
- Conference: Southwestern Athletic Conference
- Record: 13–17 (11–7 SWAC)
- Head coach: Robert McCullum (5th season)
- Assistant coaches: Willie Powers III; Isaac Brown; Craig Brown
- Home arena: Al Lawson Center

2021–22 SWAC men's basketball standings
	Conf.				Overall
Team	W		L	PCT	W		L	PCT
Alcorn State	14	–	4	.778	17	–	17	.500
Texas Southern †	13	–	5	.722	19	–	13	.594
Southern	12	–	6	.667	17	–	14	.548
Florida A&M	11	–	7	.611	13	–	17	.433
Alabama A&M	10	–	8	.556	12	–	18	.400
Grambling State	9	–	9	.500	12	–	20	.375
Jackson State	9	–	9	.500	11	–	19	.367
Prairie View A&M	8	–	10	.444	8	–	19	.296
Alabama State	8	–	10	.444	9	–	21	.300
Bethune–Cookman	7	–	11	.389	9	–	21	.300
Arkansas–Pine Bluff	5	–	13	.278	7	–	24	.226
Mississippi Valley State	2	–	16	.111	2	–	26	.071
† 2022 SWAC tournament winner

The 2021–22 Florida A&M Rattlers basketball team represented Florida A&M University in the 2021–22 NCAA Division I men's basketball season. The Rattlers, led by fifth-year head coach Robert McCullum, played their home games at the Al Lawson Center in Tallahassee, Florida as members of the Southwestern Athletic Conference.

== Previous season ==
In a season limited due to the ongoing COVID-19 pandemic, the Rattlers finished the 2020–21 season 8–12, 7–5 in MEAC play to finish in second place in the Southern Division. In the MEAC tournament, they were defeated by Morgan State in the quarterfinals.

On July 1, 2021, the Rattlers officially returned to the SWAC after being a member of the Mid-Eastern Athletic Conference since 1986.

== Roster ==
2021–22 Florida A&M Rattlers men's basketball team
Players
Coaches

Pos.	#	Name	Height	Weight	Year	Hometown
F	0	Dimingus Stevens	6 ft 6 in (1.98 m)	180 lb (82 kg)	So	Washington, D.C.
G	1	Jalen Speer	6 ft 1 in (1.85 m)	172 lb (78 kg)	So	Gainesville, FL
G	2	Kamron Reaves	6 ft 2 in (1.88 m)	170 lb (77 kg)	GS	Champaign, IL
G	3	M. J. Randolph	6 ft 4 in (1.93 m)	170 lb (77 kg)	Sr	Pensacola, FL
G	4	Jahvon Smith	6 ft 4 in (1.93 m)	200 lb (91 kg)	So	Hallandale Beach, FL
G	5	Keith Littles	6 ft 4 in (1.93 m)	170 lb (77 kg)	Sr	Augusta, GA
F	10	Chase Barrs	6 ft 9 in (2.06 m)	185 lb (84 kg)	Jr	Tampa, FL
F	11	Caleb Muller	—	—	Fr	Boca Raton, FL
G	13	Jamir Williams	6 ft 5 in (1.96 m)	170 lb (77 kg)	RS Jr	Newnan, GA
F	14	Alex Andrews	6 ft 7 in (2.01 m)	200 lb (91 kg)	So	Ocoee, FL
G	20	Jai Clark	6 ft 2 in (1.88 m)	185 lb (84 kg)	Sr	Orlando, FL
F	21	Johnny Brown	6 ft 9 in (2.06 m)	210 lb (95 kg)	Jr	Daytona Beach, FL
F	22	Saiyd Burnside	—	—	Fr	Greenville, SC
F	23	Bryce Moragne	6 ft 5 in (1.96 m)	220 lb (100 kg)	GS	Tampa, FL
C	24	Wylie Howard III	6 ft 11 in (2.11 m)	250 lb (113 kg)	RS Jr	Lauderhill, FL
F	25	DJ Jones	6 ft 9 in (2.06 m)	200 lb (91 kg)	GS	Baton Rouge, LA
G	32	Jordan Jackson	5 ft 8 in (1.73 m)	160 lb (73 kg)	Fr	Miami, FL
F	34	Richard Mathews	—	—	Fr	Estero, FL
F	44	Legend Stamps	—	—	Jr	Rancho Cucamonga, CA
F	55	Hnric Murray Jr.	6 ft 5 in (1.96 m)	215 lb (98 kg)	Sr	Orlando, FL

Head coach

- Robert McCullum (Birmingham–Southern)

Assistant coach(es)

- Willie Powers III (Georgia Southern)
- Isaac Brown (Florida A&M)
- Craig Brown (Florida)

Legend

- (C) Team captain
- (S) Suspended
- (I) Ineligible
- (W) Walk-on
- Injured
- Current redshirt

Roster
Last update: December 6, 2021

== Schedule and results ==
Date time, TV	Rank^{#}	Opponent^{#}	Result	Record	High points	High rebounds	High assists	Site (attendance) city, state
Non-conference regular season
November 10, 2021*; 8:00 pm, ESPN+		at Kansas State	L 57–67	0–1	27 – Randolph	9 – Barrs	6 – Randolph	Bramlage Coliseum (5,296); Manhattan, KS
November 15, 2021*; 7:00 pm		LeMoyne–Owen	W 95–70	1–1	21 – Randolph	9 – Randolph	10 – Randolph	Al Lawson Center (2,269); Tallahassee, FL
November 21, 2021*; 8:00 pm, ACCN		at Miami (FL)	L 59–86	1–2	24 – Jones	8 – Jones	3 – Randolph	Watsco Center (3,175); Coral Gables, FL
November 24, 2021*; 9:00 pm, CUSA.tv		at UTEP; Golden Turkey Classic	L 53–67	1–3	17 – Randolph	6 – Jones	3 – Speer	Don Haskins Center (4,196); El Paso, TX
November 26, 2021*; 5:00 pm, ESPN+		at UC Riverside; Golden Turkey Classic	L 49–60	1–4	14 – Randolph	8 – Moragne	4 – Reaves	SRC Arena (212); Riverside, CA
December 1, 2021*; 7:00 pm		Fort Valley State	W 76–63	2–4	23 – Randolph	8 – Moragne	4 – Moragne	Al Lawson Center (2,087); Tallahassee, FL
December 7, 2021*; 7:00 pm, Facebook		Florida Gulf Coast	L 55–69	2–5	13 – Moragne	9 – Moragne	4 – Randolph	Al Lawson Center (2,313); Tallahassee, FL
December 12, 2021*; 3:00 pm, ESPN+		at Akron	L 66–73	2–6	21 – Randolph	6 – 2 Tied	5 – Speer	James A. Rhodes Arena (1,529); Akron, OH
December 14, 2021*; 8:00 pm, ESPN+		at Cincinnati	L 50–77	2–7	22 – Randolph	11 – Moragne	4 – Speer	Fifth Third Arena (7,701); Cincinnati, OH
December 17, 2021*; 9:00 pm		at Santa Clara	L 66–80	2–8	31 – Randolph	8 – Jones	4 – 2 Tied	Leavey Center (675); Santa Clara, CA
December 19, 2021*; 10:00 pm, ESPN+		at UC Santa Barbara	L 62–73	2–9	16 – 2 Tied	7 – 2 Tied	6 – Speer	The Thunderdome; Santa Barbara, CA
December 21, 2021*; 5:00 pm, P12N		at Arizona State	Canceled due to a power outage at Desert Financial Arena					Desert Financial Arena; Tempe, AZ
December 29, 2021*; 9:00 pm		at Illinois	Canceled due to COVID-19 protocols					State Farm Center; Champaign, IL
SWAC regular season
January 3, 2022; 7:30 pm		at Bethune–Cookman	L 59–66	2–10 (0–1)	17 – Randolph	9 – Randolph	5 – Randolph	Moore Gymnasium (176); Daytona Beach, FL
January 8, 2022; 4:00 pm		Southern	L 66–80	2–11 (0–2)	30 – Randolph	9 – Moragne	3 – Littles	Al Lawson Center; Tallahassee, FL
January 10, 2022; 7:30 pm		Grambling State	W 75–66	3–11 (1–2)	24 – Randolph	9 – Jones	4 – Moragne	Al Lawson Center (1,687); Tallahassee, FL
January 15, 2022; 6:30 pm		at Arkansas–Pine Bluff	W 71–66 ^{OT}	4–11 (2–2)	25 – Randolph	11 – Jones	4 – 2 Tied	K. L. Johnson Complex (1,254); Pine Bluff, AR
January 17, 2022; 8:30 pm		at Mississippi Valley State	W 78–70	5–11 (3–2)	22 – Randolph	10 – Barrs	6 – Moragne	Harrison HPER Complex (605); Itta Bena, MS
January 22, 2022; 4:00 pm		Alcorn State	W 70–68	6–11 (4–2)	21 – Randolph	5 – 2 Tied	5 – Randolph	Al Lawson Center (2,169); Tallahassee, FL
January 24, 2022; 7:30 pm		Jackson State	W 67–64	7–11 (5–2)	18 – Littles	9 – Morgane	3 – 3 Tied	Al Lawson Center; Tallahassee, FL
January 29, 2022; 3:00 pm		at Alabama A&M	W 65–60	8–11 (6–2)	16 – Randolph	7 – 2 Tied	6 – Reaves	Elmore Gymnasium (1,706); Normal, AL
January 31, 2022; 9:00 pm		at Alabama State	W 66–65	9–11 (7–2)	17 – Randolph	10 – 2 Tied	4 – Reaves	Dunn–Oliver Acadome (2,150); Montgomery, AL
February 5, 2022; 4:30 pm, NBA TV		Texas Southern	L 55–67	9–12 (7–3)	22 – Randolph	10 – Randolph	4 – Randolph	Al Lawson Center (3,087); Tallahassee, FL
February 7, 2022; 7:30 pm		Prairie View A&M	W 61–60	10–12 (8–3)	17 – Randolph	11 – Jones	6 – Randolph	Al Lawson Center (2,087); Tallahassee, FL
February 12, 2022; 6:30 pm		at Jackson State	L 56–60	10–13 (8–4)	22 – Moragne	8 – Randolph	5 – Randolph	Williams Assembly Center (2,745); Jackson, MS
February 14, 2022; 8:30 pm		at Alcorn State	L 56–68	10–14 (8–5)	12 – Stevens	9 – Randolph	4 – Randolph	Davey Whitney Complex (440); Lorman, MS
February 19, 2022; 4:00 pm		Alabama State	W 86–83 ^{OT}	11–14 (9–5)	30 – Randolph	6 – Randolph	8 – Randolph	Al Lawson Center (0); Tallahassee, FL
February 21, 2022; 7:30 pm		Alabama A&M	L 63–71	11–15 (9–6)	20 – Randolph	6 – Jones	2 – 4 Tied	Al Lawson Center (2,287); Tallahassee, FL
February 26, 2022; 2:30 pm		at Grambling State	W 79–73	12–15 (10–6)	18 – Randolph	11 – Jones	5 – Randolph	Fredrick C. Hobdy Assembly Center (2,971); Grambling, LA
February 28, 2022; 6:30 pm		at Southern	L 49–58	12–16 (10–7)	14 – Moragne	5 – Speer	1 – Tied	F. G. Clark Center (4,128); Baton Rouge, LA
March 5, 2022; 4:00 pm		Bethune–Cookman	W 84–73	13–16 (11–7)	19 – Randolph	7 – Jones	9 – Speer	Al Lawson Center (4,687); Tallahassee, FL
SWAC tournament
March 10, 2022; 8:30 pm, ESPN+	(4)	vs. (5) Alabama A&M; Quarterfinals	L 56–61	13–17	19 – Randolph	8 – Jones	3 – Moragne	Bartow Arena (777); Birmingham, AL
*Non-conference game. ^{#}Rankings from AP Poll. (#) Tournament seedings in parentheses. All times are in Eastern.
