= 2021–22 Mississippi Valley State Delta Devils basketball team =

American college basketball season

2021–22 Mississippi Valley State Delta Devils basketball
- Conference: Southwestern Athletic Conference
- Record: 2–26 (2–16 SWAC)
- Head coach: Lindsey Hunter (3rd season; first 25 games); George Ivory (interim)
- Assistant coaches: Allen Perry; Ernest Pearsall; Zach Barnes
- Home arena: Harrison HPER Complex

2021–22 SWAC men's basketball standings
	Conf.				Overall
Team	W		L	PCT	W		L	PCT
Alcorn State	14	–	4	.778	17	–	17	.500
Texas Southern †	13	–	5	.722	19	–	13	.594
Southern	12	–	6	.667	17	–	14	.548
Florida A&M	11	–	7	.611	13	–	17	.433
Alabama A&M	10	–	8	.556	12	–	18	.400
Grambling State	9	–	9	.500	12	–	20	.375
Jackson State	9	–	9	.500	11	–	19	.367
Prairie View A&M	8	–	10	.444	8	–	19	.296
Alabama State	8	–	10	.444	9	–	21	.300
Bethune–Cookman	7	–	11	.389	9	–	21	.300
Arkansas–Pine Bluff	5	–	13	.278	7	–	24	.226
Mississippi Valley State	2	–	16	.111	2	–	26	.071
† 2022 SWAC tournament winner

The 2021–22 Mississippi Valley State Delta Devils basketball team represented Mississippi Valley State University (MVSU) during the 2021–22 NCAA Division I men's basketball season. The Delta Devils were led by third-year head coach Lindsey Hunter for the first 25 games of the season and by interim head coach George Ivory for the final three games of the season. They played their home games at the Harrison HPER Complex in Itta Bena, Mississippi as members of the Southwestern Athletic Conference (SWAC).

They finished the season 2–26, 2–13 in SWAC play, to finish in last place. They failed to qualify for the SWAC tournament.

On February 24, 2022, head coach Lindsey Hunter was placed on paid administrative leave for an unspecified period of time. Former MVSU player and Arkansas–Pine Bluff coach George Ivory was named interim coach for the remainder of the season. On March 11, Hunter resigned as head coach. Three days later, the school officially removed the interim tag and named Ivory the team's new head coach.

== Previous season ==
In a season limited due to the ongoing COVID-19 pandemic, the Delta Devils finished the 2020–21 season 2–22 overall, 2–13 in SWAC play, to finish in last place.

== Roster ==
2021–22 Mississippi Valley State Delta Devils men's basketball team
Players
Coaches

Pos.	#	Name	Height	Weight	Year	Hometown
G	0/31	David McCoy	6 ft 0 in (1.83 m)	—	Fr	Meridian, MS
F	1	Gary Grant	6 ft 6 in (1.98 m)	—	Fr	Queens, NY
G	2	Elijah Davis	6 ft 1 in (1.85 m)	—	Fr	Severn, MD
G	3	Kadar Waller	6 ft 0 in (1.83 m)	—	So	Bakersfield, CA
F	5	Alexander Perry	6 ft 5 in (1.96 m)	—	Sr	Tallahassee, FL
G	10	Devin Gordon	6 ft 4 in (1.93 m)	—	Fr	Powder Springs, GA
G	11	Caleb Hunter	5 ft 10 in (1.78 m)	—	So	Detroit, MI
F	13	Tyler Foster	6 ft 5 in (1.96 m)	—	Jr	Baltimore, MD
F	14	John Aguer	6 ft 9 in (2.06 m)	—	So	Aweil, South Sudan
G	15	Jordan Johnson	6 ft 1 in (1.85 m)	—	Jr	Memphis, TN
F	20	Quoiren Waldon	6 ft 9 in (2.06 m)	—	Fr	Atlanta, GA
F	21	Robert Carpenter	6 ft 7 in (2.01 m)	—	Jr	Detroit, MI
G	22	Terry Collins	6 ft 3 in (1.91 m)	—	Sr	Kenner, LA
C	25	Daniel Umoh	6 ft 9 in (2.06 m)	—	Fr	Lagos, Nigeria
C	32	Lee'Andre Howard	7 ft 1 in (2.16 m)	—	Fr	Los Angeles, CA
G	33	George III Ivory	6 ft 0 in (1.83 m)	—	So	Jackson, MS

Head coach

- Lindsey Hunter (Jackson State)

Assistant coach(es)

- Alan Perry
- Ernest Pearsall
- Zach Barnes

Legend

- (C) Team captain
- (S) Suspended
- (I) Ineligible
- (W) Walk-on
- Injured
- Current redshirt

Roster
Last update: February 23, 2022

== Schedule and results ==
Date time, TV	Rank^{#}	Opponent^{#}	Result	Record	High points	High rebounds	High assists	Site (attendance) city, state
Non-conference regular season
November 9, 2021*; 6:45 p.m., FS1		at St. John's	L 61–119	0–1	16 – Hunter	5 – Davis	7 – Davis	Carnesecca Arena (4,749); Queens, NY
November 13, 2021*; 9:00 p.m., ESPN+		at California Baptist	L 66–95	0–2	17 – Carpenter	8 – Umoh	5 – Davis	CBU Events Center (4,957); Riverside, CA
November 26, 2021*; 3:00 p.m., SECN+		at Ole Miss	L 58–73	0–3	27 – Carpenter	9 – Aguer	6 – Davis	SJB Pavilion (5,905); Oxford, MS
November 29, 2021*; 7:00 p.m., SECN+		at Vanderbilt	L 36–75	0–4	11 – Carpenter	8 – Carpenter	2 – 2 tied	Memorial Gymnasium (5,181); Nashville, TN
December 1, 2021*; 8:00 p.m., ESPN+		at North Alabama	L 58–72	0–5	15 – Hunter	6 – Carpenter	4 – Davis	Flowers Hall (543); Florence, AL
December 4, 2021*; 7:00 p.m., ESPN+		at Grand Canyon	L 44–91	0–6	12 – Carpenter	4 – 4 tied	3 – Davis	GCU Arena (6,715); Phoenix, AZ
December 9, 2021*; 6:00 p.m.		Nicholls	L 80–95	0–7	19 – Carpenter	9 – Carpenter	5 – Hunter	Harrison HPER Complex (202); Itta Bena, MS
December 11, 2021*; 4:00 p.m.		Arkansas State	L 77–82	0–8	20 – Hunter	6 – Grant	4 – Collins	Harrison HPER Complex (237); Itta Bena, MS
December 18, 2021*; 3:00 p.m.		at Nicholls	L 73–104	0–9	23 – Carpenter	4 – 3 tied	4 – Hunter	Stopher Gymnasium (287); Thibodaux, LA
December 22, 2021*; 6:30 p.m., CUSA.tv		at UAB	L 58–100	0–10	14 – Carpenter	9 – McCoy	5 – McCoy	Bartow Arena (2,695); Birmingham, AL
December 29, 2021*; 6:00 p.m., ESPN+		at South Florida	Canceled due to COVID-19 protocols					Yuengling Center; Tampa, FL
SWAC regular season
January 3, 2022; 4:00 p.m.		Alabama State	L 75–84	0–11 (0–1)	23 – Carpenter	8 – McCoy	7 – Davis	Harrison HPER Complex (156); Itta Bena, MS
January 5, 2022; 7:30 p.m.		Alabama A&M	L 67–72	0–12 (0–2)	32 – Gordon	8 – Grant	6 – 2 tied	Harrison HPER Complex (395); Itta Bena, MS
January 8, 2022; 5:30 p.m.		at Prairie View A&M	W 84–82 ^{OT}	1–12 (1–2)	26 – Carpenter	7 – Carpenter	4 – Davis	William Nicks Building; Prairie View, TX
January 10, 2022; 7:30 p.m.		at Texas Southern	L 58–95	1–13 (1–3)	17 – Gordon	11 – Umoh	2 – 3 tied	H&PE Arena (580); Houston, TX
January 15, 2022; 4:00 p.m.		Bethune–Cookman	L 60–62	1–14 (1–4)	21 – Hunter	11 – Umoh	6 – Waller	Harrison HPER Complex (314); Itta Bena, MS
January 17, 2022; 7:30 p.m.		Florida A&M	L 70–78	1–15 (1–5)	31 – Hunter	6 – Grant	7 – Davis	Harrison HPER Complex (605); Itta Bena, MS
January 22, 2022; 2:30 p.m.		at Grambling State	L 64–68	1–16 (1–6)	17 – Grant	7 – Gordon	4 – Grant	Fredrick C. Hobdy Assembly Center (1,713); Grambling, LA
January 24, 2022; 7:30 p.m.		at Southern	L 72-100	1–17 (1–7)	20 – Waller	5 – Umoh	3 – Davis	F. G. Clark Center (3,879); Baton Rouge, LA
January 29, 2022; 4:00 p.m.		Arkansas–Pine Bluff	L 68–74	1–18 (1–8)	14 – Hunter	11 – Grant	4 – Davis	Harrison HPER Complex (1,985); Itta Bena, MS
February 5, 2022; 4:00 p.m.		Jackson State	L 65–69	1–19 (1–9)	16 – Hunter	6 – 2 tied	3 – Davis	Harrison HPER Complex (4,689); Itta Bena, MS
February 7, 2022; 7:30 p.m.		Alcorn State	L 71–79	1–20 (1–10)	22 – Hunter	6 – Grant	3 – 2 tied	Harrison HPER Complex (3,829); Itta Bena, MS
February 12, 2022; 4:00 p.m.		at Alabama A&M	L 92–94 ^{4OT}	1–21 (1–11)	21 – Gordon	16 – Grant	8 – Grant	Elmore Gymnasium (1,700); Normal, AL
February 14, 2022; 7:30 p.m.		at Alabama State	W 85–71	2–21 (2–11)	24 – Collins	9 – Umoh	8 – Hunter	Dunn–Oliver Acadome (0); Montgomery, AL
February 19, 2022; 4:00 p.m.		Texas Southern	L 59–79	2–22 (2–12)	14 – Collins	6 – Grant	5 – Collins	Harrison HPER Complex (2,232); Itta Bena, MS
February 21, 2022; 7:30 p.m.		Prairie View A&M	L 64–69	2–23 (2–13)	23 – Grant	7 – McCoy	4 – McCoy	Harrison HPER Complex (3,702); Itta Bena, MS
February 26, 2022; 4:00 p.m.		at Arkansas–Pine Bluff	L 79–93	2–24 (2–14)	22 – Gordon	6 – McCoy	4 – McCoy	K. L. Johnson Complex (2,445); Pine Bluff, AR
March 3, 2022; 7:30 p.m.		at Alcorn State	L 69–72	2–25 (2–15)	24 – Collins	10 – Grant	4 – Grant	Davey Whitney Complex (398); Lorman, MS
March 5, 2022; 4:00 p.m.		at Jackson State	L 69–76	2–26 (2–16)	16 – Collins	7 – McCoy	6 – McCoy	Williams Assembly Center (2,997); Jackson, MS
*Non-conference game. ^{#}Rankings from AP poll. (#) Tournament seedings in parentheses. All times are in Central.
