= 2021–22 Alabama State Hornets basketball team =

American college basketball season

2021–22 Alabama State Hornets basketball
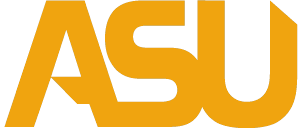
- Conference: Southwestern Athletic Conference
- Record: 9–21 (8–10 SWAC)
- Head coach: Mo Williams (2nd season)
- Associate head coach: Trey Johnson
- Assistant coaches: Tyrone Levett; Keith Williams
- Home arena: Dunn–Oliver Acadome

2021–22 SWAC men's basketball standings
	Conf.				Overall
Team	W		L	PCT	W		L	PCT
Alcorn State	14	–	4	.778	17	–	17	.500
Texas Southern †	13	–	5	.722	19	–	13	.594
Southern	12	–	6	.667	17	–	14	.548
Florida A&M	11	–	7	.611	13	–	17	.433
Alabama A&M	10	–	8	.556	12	–	18	.400
Grambling State	9	–	9	.500	12	–	20	.375
Jackson State	9	–	9	.500	11	–	19	.367
Prairie View A&M	8	–	10	.444	8	–	19	.296
Alabama State	8	–	10	.444	9	–	21	.300
Bethune–Cookman	7	–	11	.389	9	–	21	.300
Arkansas–Pine Bluff	5	–	13	.278	7	–	24	.226
Mississippi Valley State	2	–	16	.111	2	–	26	.071
† 2022 SWAC tournament winner

The 2021–22 Alabama State Hornets basketball team represented Alabama State University in the 2021–22 NCAA Division I men's basketball season. The Hornets, led by second-year head coach Mo Williams, played their home games at the Dunn–Oliver Acadome in Montgomery, Alabama as members of the Southwestern Athletic Conference (SWAC).

== Previous season ==
The Hornets finished the 2020–21 season 4–14 in SWAC play, to finish in eighth place. They were ineligible for postseason due to APR violations.

== Roster ==
2021–22 Alabama State Hornets men's basketball team
Players
Coaches

Pos.	#	Name	Height	Weight	Year	Previous school	Hometown
F	0	Trace Young	6 ft 8 in (2.03 m)	183 lb (83 kg)	Jr	John A. Logan College	Owensboro, KY
G	1	DJ Jackson	6 ft 1 in (1.85 m)	165 lb (75 kg)	Fr	Etiwanda High School	Los Angeles, CA
F	2	Jordan O'Neal	6 ft 7 in (2.01 m)	197 lb (89 kg)	So	Coahoma Community College	Mobile, AL
F	3	Gerald Liddell	6 ft 8 in (2.03 m)	203 lb (92 kg)	Jr	Texas	Cibolo, TX
G	4	E.J. Clark	5 ft 11 in (1.8 m)	165 lb (75 kg)	Jr	Bossier Parish Community College	Dallas, TX
G	5	Juan Reyna	6 ft 2 in (1.88 m)	182 lb (83 kg)	Fr	Duncanville High School	San Antonio, TX
F	10	Michael Barber	6 ft 8 in (2.03 m)	212 lb (96 kg)	RS So	Southwest Mississippi Community College	Jackson, MS
G	11	Jayme Mitchell	6 ft 5 in (1.96 m)	187 lb (85 kg)	Fr	Forest Hill High School	Jackson, MS
G	12	Malik Smiley	6 ft 3 in (1.91 m)	165 lb (75 kg)	RS Fr	IMG Academy	Birmingham, AL
G	13	Kareem Clark	6 ft 2 in (1.88 m)	191 lb (87 kg)	Jr	South Mountain Community College	Sacramento, CA
G	14	Christian McCray	6 ft 6 in (1.98 m)	171 lb (78 kg)	Jr	Cal State Fullerton	Las Vegas, NV
G	15	Kevion Stewart	6 ft 3 in (1.91 m)	193 lb (88 kg)	RS Sr	SIU Edwardsville	Memphis, TN
G	20	Kenny Strawbridge	6 ft 6 in (1.98 m)	202 lb (92 kg)	RS So	Western Nebraska	Rockford, IL
F	22	Darrell Reed	6 ft 8 in (2.03 m)	211 lb (96 kg)	Fr	Hammond High School	Hammond, IN
G	23	Ashton McClelland	6 ft 0 in (1.83 m)	153 lb (69 kg)	RS So	Texas Southern	Houston, TX
F	24	Isaiah Range	6 ft 3 in (1.91 m)	215 lb (98 kg)	So	Tarleton State	Cedar Hill, TX

Head coach

- Mo Williams (Alabama)

Assistant coach(es)

- Trey Johnson (Jackson State)
- Tyrone Levett (Alabama State)
- Keith Williams (Arkansas–Pine Bluff)

Legend

- (C) Team captain
- (S) Suspended
- (I) Ineligible
- (W) Walk-on
- Injured
- Current redshirt

Roster
Last update: January 3, 2022

== Schedule and results ==
Date time, TV	Rank^{#}	Opponent^{#}	Result	Record	High points	High rebounds	High assists	Site (attendance) city, state
Non-conference regular season
November 9, 2021*; 7:00 p.m., ESPN3		at Western Kentucky	L 74–79	0–1	23 – Young	9 – Young	5 – Strawbridge	E. A. Diddle Arena (4,023); Bowling Green, KY
November 10, 2021*; 7:00 p.m., SECN+		at Vanderbilt	L 72–91	0–2	11 – Young	5 – 3 tied	3 – Mitchell	Memorial Gymnasium (5,459); Nashville, TN
November 13, 2021*; 7:00 p.m., ESPN3		at Missouri State	L 60–78	0–3	14 – Liddell	6 – Range	2 – Young	JQH Arena (3,922); Springfield, MO
November 16, 2021*; 7:00 p.m., ESPN+		at Iowa State	L 60–68	0–4	15 – Range	10 – Range	3 – 2 tied	Hilton Coliseum (12,100); Ames, IA
November 18, 2021*; 6:00 p.m., BTN		at Iowa	L 82–108	0–5	20 – McCray	10 – Barber	4 – Liddell	Carver–Hawkeye Arena (9,957); Iowa City, IA
November 20, 2021*; 7:00 p.m.		North Carolina Central	W 80–74	1–5	22 – Liddell	14 – O'Neal	4 – 2 tied	Dunn–Oliver Acadome (932); Montgomery, AL
November 28, 2021*; 3:30 p.m.		North Alabama	L 69–81	1–6	16 – Strawbridge	8 – O'Neal	3 – Liddell	Dunn–Oliver Acadome (450); Montgomery, AL
December 1, 2021*; 6:00 p.m., ESPN+		at Dayton	L 54–93	1–7	10 – 2 tied	7 – Barber	2 – 4 tied	UD Arena (13,407); Dayton, OH
December 8, 2021*; 6:00 p.m.		Samford	L 64–74	1–8	14 – Strawbridge	9 – Range	3 – Clark	Dunn–Oliver Acadome (175); Montgomery, AL
December 11, 2021*; 5:00 p.m., WCC Network		at Pepperdine	L 62–79	1–9	16 – Strawbridge	11 – Strawbridge	4 – Jackson	Firestone Fieldhouse (500); Malibu, CA
December 15, 2021*; 10:00 p.m., P12N		at UCLA	Canceled due to COVID-19 protocols					Pauley Pavilion; Los Angeles, CA
December 21, 2021*; 7:00 p.m., ESPN+		at Memphis	Canceled due to COVID-19 protocols					FedExForum; Memphis, TN
December 22, 2021*; 1:00 p.m., LHN		at No. 16 Texas	L 48–68	1–10	16 – Liddell	6 – Young	2 – 2 tied	Frank Erwin Center (11,732); Austin, TX
December 28, 2021*; 1:00 p.m., ESPN+		at Texas Tech	L 53–75	1–11	15 – Liddell	6 – 2 tied	2 – Strawbridge	United Supermarkets Arena (12,059); Lubbock, TX
SWAC regular season
January 3, 2022; 4:00 p.m.		at Mississippi Valley State	W 84–75	2–11 (1–0)	27 – Strawbridge	11 – Barber	7 – Clark	Harrison HPER Complex (156); Itta Bena, MS
January 5, 2022; 7:30 p.m.		at Arkansas–Pine Bluff	L 68–70	2–12 (1–1)	12 – 2 tied	10 – O'Neal	4 – Clark	K. L. Johnson Complex (564); Pine Bluff, AR
January 8, 2022; 4:30 p.m.		Jackson State	W 72–57	3–12 (2–1)	17 – Strawbridge	5 – 2 tied	4 – Clark	Dunn–Oliver Acadome (525); Montgomery, AL
January 10, 2022; 8:00 p.m.		Alcorn State	L 60–70	3–13 (2–2)	13 – Liddell	8 – Liddell	5 – Jackson	Dunn–Oliver Acadome (400); Montgomery, AL
January 15, 2022; 4:30 p.m.		Alabama A&M	W 59–55	4–13 (3–2)	15 – Young	7 – 2 tied	4 – Clark	Dunn–Oliver Acadome (1,150); Montgomery, AL
January 22, 2022; 5:30 p.m.		at Prairie View A&M	L 67–70	4–14 (3–3)	15 – Range	6 – 3 tied	4 – Clark	William Nicks Building (1,206); Prairie View, TX
January 24, 2022; 7:30 p.m.		at Texas Southern	L 66–73	4–15 (3–4)	17 – Young	10 – Strawbridge	3 – Jackson	H&PE Arena (2,163); Houston, TX
January 29, 2022; 7:00 p.m.		vs. Bethune–Cookman; Bridge Builder Classic	W 79–73	5–15 (4–4)	21 – Young	8 – Young	4 – Clark	Mitchell Center (1,310); Mobile, AL
January 31, 2022; 8:00 p.m.		Florida A&M	L 65–66	5–16 (4–5)	29 – Young	8 – Young	5 – Jackson	Dunn–Oliver Acadome (2,150); Montgomery, AL
February 5, 2022; 2:30 p.m.		at Grambling State	W 80–72	6–16 (5–5)	25 – Reyna	7 – 2 tied	4 – Range	Fredrick C. Hobdy Assembly Center (2,191); Grambling, LA
February 7, 2022; 7:30 p.m.		at Southern	L 58–72	6–17 (5–6)	19 – Range	8 – Young	3 – Jackson	F. G. Clark Center (4,989); Baton Rouge, LA
February 12, 2022; 4:30 p.m.		Arkansas–Pine Bluff	L 70–75	6–18 (5–7)	19 – Strawbridge	6 – Liddell	5 – Liddell	Dunn–Oliver Acadome (980); Montgomery, AL
February 14, 2022; 8:00 p.m.		Mississippi Valley State	L 71–85	6–19 (5–8)	18 – Strawbridge	5 – O'Neal	5 – Strawbridge	Dunn–Oliver Acadome (0); Montgomery, AL
February 19, 2022; 3:00 p.m.		at Florida A&M	L 83–86 ^{OT}	6–20 (5–9)	24 – Reyna	12 – Liddell	4 – Strawbridge	Al Lawson Center (0); Tallahassee, FL
February 21, 2022; 7:00 p.m.		at Bethune–Cookman	W 79–68	7–20 (6–9)	28 – Strawbridge	12 – Liddell	6 – Strawbridge	Moore Gymnasium (1,000); Daytona Beach, FL
February 26, 2022; 4:00 p.m.		at Alabama A&M	L 65–80	7–21 (6–10)	13 – Liddell	14 – Liddell	3 – Strawbridge	Elmore Gymnasium (2,400); Normal, AL
March 3, 2022; 8:00 p.m.		Southern	W 77–67	8–21 (7–10)	16 – Clark	10 – Liddell	3 – Clark	Dunn–Oliver Acadome (1,098); Montgomery, AL
March 5, 2022; 4:30 p.m.		Grambling State	W 78–75	9–21 (8–10)	21 – Young	10 – Young	4 – Clark	Dunn–Oliver Acadome (1,201); Montgomery, AL
*Non-conference game. ^{#}Rankings from AP poll. (#) Tournament seedings in parentheses. All times are in Central.
