= 2021–22 Jackson State Tigers basketball team =

American college basketball season

2021–22 Jackson State Tigers basketball
- Conference: Southwestern Athletic Conference
- East Division
- Record: 11–19 (9–9 SWAC)
- Head coach: Wayne Brent (9th season)
- Assistant coaches: De'Suan Dixon; Christopher Woodall
- Home arena: Williams Assembly Center

2021–22 SWAC men's basketball standings
	Conf.				Overall
Team	W		L	PCT	W		L	PCT
Alcorn State	14	–	4	.778	17	–	17	.500
Texas Southern †	13	–	5	.722	19	–	13	.594
Southern	12	–	6	.667	17	–	14	.548
Florida A&M	11	–	7	.611	13	–	17	.433
Alabama A&M	10	–	8	.556	12	–	18	.400
Grambling State	9	–	9	.500	12	–	20	.375
Jackson State	9	–	9	.500	11	–	19	.367
Prairie View A&M	8	–	10	.444	8	–	19	.296
Alabama State	8	–	10	.444	9	–	21	.300
Bethune–Cookman	7	–	11	.389	9	–	21	.300
Arkansas–Pine Bluff	5	–	13	.278	7	–	24	.226
Mississippi Valley State	2	–	16	.111	2	–	26	.071
† 2022 SWAC tournament winner

The 2021–22 Jackson State Tigers basketball team represented Jackson State University in the 2021–22 NCAA Division I men's basketball season. The Tigers, led by ninth-year head coach Wayne Brent, played their home games at the Williams Assembly Center in Jackson, Mississippi as members of the Southwestern Athletic Conference.

== Previous season ==
The Tigers finished the 2020–21 season 12–6, 11–0 in SWAC play, and were SWAC regular season co-champions alongside Prairie View A&M. In the SWAC tournament, they defeated Arkansas–Pine Bluff in the quarterfinals, but were upset by eventual champions Texas Southern in overtime in the semifinals.

== Roster ==
2021–22 Jackson State Tigers men's basketball team
Players
Coaches

Pos.	#	Name	Height	Weight	Year	Hometown
G	0	Gabe Watson	6 ft 2 in (1.88 m)	190 lb (86 kg)	Jr	Ridgeland, Mississippi
F	1	Darius Hicks	6 ft 8 in (2.03 m)	235 lb (107 kg)	GS	Quitman, Mississippi
G	2	Ken Evans Jr.	6 ft 5 in (1.96 m)	200 lb (91 kg)	RS Fr	Jackson, Mississippi
G	3	Jonas James III	6 ft 0 in (1.83 m)	160 lb (73 kg)	Sr	Jackson, Mississippi
G	4	Coltie Young	6 ft 3 in (1.91 m)	201 lb (91 kg)	Fr	Starkville, Mississippi
G	5	John Wes Taylor	5 ft 10 in (1.78 m)	160 lb (73 kg)	Fr	Olive Branch, Mississippi
G	10	Dyllan Taylor	6 ft 1 in (1.85 m)	190 lb (86 kg)	GS	Brandon, Mississippi
F/C	11	Jayveous McKinnis	6 ft 7 in (2.01 m)	225 lb (102 kg)	Sr	Pearl, Mississippi
G	12	Darrian Wilson	6 ft 4 in (1.93 m)	205 lb (93 kg)	GS	Brookhaven, Mississippi
F	13	Isaiah Williams	6 ft 7 in (2.01 m)	225 lb (102 kg)	GS	Dayton, Ohio
G	14	Justin Brown	6 ft 0 in (1.83 m)	180 lb (82 kg)	Jr	Alpharetta, Georgia
G	15	Malachai Wideman	6 ft 5 in (1.96 m)	190 lb (86 kg)	Fr	Venice, Florida
F	20	Darryl Jordan	6 ft 7 in (2.01 m)	210 lb (95 kg)	So	Hattiesburg, Mississippi
G/F	21	Chris Freeman	6 ft 6 in (1.98 m)	190 lb (86 kg)	GS	Winston–Salem, North Carolina
G/F	22	Chance Moore	6 ft 8 in (2.03 m)	200 lb (91 kg)	Jr	Louisville, Kentucky
F	23	Kelvin Wesley	6 ft 4 in (1.93 m)	195 lb (88 kg)	Jr	Houston, Texas
G	24	Jalani Bell	6 ft 0 in (1.83 m)	185 lb (84 kg)	Fr	Jackson, Mississippi
F	25	Joseph Dupree II	6 ft 6 in (1.98 m)	240 lb (109 kg)	Fr	Jackson, Mississippi
F	30	David McDaniel	6 ft 9 in (2.06 m)	210 lb (95 kg)	Fr	Alpharetta, Georgia
F	31	Jamarcus Jones	6 ft 7 in (2.01 m)	200 lb (91 kg)	Jr	Sardis, Mississippi
G	33	Geronimo Warner	6 ft 3 in (1.91 m)	175 lb (79 kg)	RS Fr	Phoenix, Arizona
F	34	Terence Lewis II	6 ft 6 in (1.98 m)	205 lb (93 kg)	Jr	Upper Marlboro, Maryland

Head coach

- Wayne Brent (Louisiana–Monroe)

Assistant coach(es)

- Cason Burk (Jackson State)
- De'Suan Dixon (Jackson State)
- Christopher Woodall (William Carey)

Legend

- (C) Team captain
- (S) Suspended
- (I) Ineligible
- (W) Walk-on
- Injured
- Current redshirt

Roster
Last update: November 22, 2021

== Schedule and results ==
Date time, TV	Rank^{#}	Opponent^{#}	Result	Record	High points	High rebounds	High assists	Site (attendance) city, state
Non-conference regular season
November 9, 2021*; 7:00 pm, BTN		at No. 11 Illinois	L 47–71	0–1	12 – Young	12 – McKinnis	2 – 2 Tied	State Farm Center (14,032); Champaign, IL
November 12, 2021*; 6:30 pm, ESPN+		at Louisiana Tech	L 68–70	0–2	20 – McKinnis	10 – McKinnis	3 – 3 Tied	Thomas Assembly Center (2,449); Ruston, LA
November 16, 2021*; 9:00 pm, ESPN+		at California Baptist	L 64–77	0–3	21 – Williams	8 – Evans	5 – James	CBU Events Center (2,631); Riverside, CA
November 21, 2021*; 3:00 pm, ESPN+		at Marshall	L 66–80	0–4	18 – Watson	12 – McKinnis	3 – 2 Tied	Cam Henderson Center (3,839); Huntington, WV
November 23, 2021*; 7:00 pm, BTN		at Indiana	L 35–70	0–5	14 – Watson	10 – McKinnis	4 – James	Simon Skjodt Assembly Hall (10,958); Bloomington, IN
November 27, 2021*; 11:00 am, ESPN+		at Louisiana	W 75–70	1–5	22 – Watson	12 – McKinnis	3 – James	Cajundome (2,756); Lafayette, LA
December 1, 2021*; 8:00 pm, CBSSN		at Marquette	L 54–83	1–6	13 – McKinnis	14 – McKinnis	4 – Evans	Fiserv Forum (11,539); Milwaukee, WI
December 4, 2021*; 3:00 pm, ESPN3		at Illinois State	W 61–55	2–6	13 – 2 Tied	12 – Evans	4 – Evans	Redbird Arena (3,089); Normal, IL
December 12, 2021*; 12:00 pm, ESPN+		at No. 17 Iowa State	L 37–47	2–7	11 – James	7 – Lewis II	5 – Evans	Hilton Coliseum (12,537); Ames, IA
December 14, 2021*; 7:00 pm, ESPN3		at Northern Iowa	L 56–66	2–8	12 – 2 Tied	14 – McKinnis	4 – James	McLeod Center (1,679); Cedar Falls, IA
December 16, 2021*; 7:00 pm, ESPN+		at Drake	L 65–70 ^{OT}	2–9	19 – McKinnis	10 – McKinnis	3 – Evans	Knapp Center (2,660); Des Moines, IA
December 21, 2021*; 2:00 pm, ESPN+		at Stephen F. Austin	Canceled due to COVID-19 protocols					William R. Johnson Coliseum; Nacogdoches, TX
December 29, 2021*; 6:00 pm		Southeastern Baptist	Canceled due to COVID-19 protocols					Williams Assembly Center; Jackson, MS
SWAC regular season
January 5, 2022; 7:30 pm		Alcorn State	L 50–65	2–10 (0–1)	15 – James	8 – McKinnis	2 – Taylor	Williams Assembly Center (717); Jackson, MS
January 8, 2022; 5:30 pm		at Alabama State	L 57–72	2–11 (0–2)	21 – Moore	8 – McKinnis	3 – Moore	Dunn–Oliver Acadome (525); Montgomery, AL
January 10, 2022; 7:30 pm		at Alabama A&M	L 58–60	2–12 (0–3)	16 – McKinnis	9 – 2 Tied	3 – James	Elmore Gymnasium (767); Normal, AL
January 15, 2022; 5:30 pm		Prairie View A&M	W 75–64	3–12 (1–3)	16 – Lewis	8 – McKinnis	1 – 4 Tied	Williams Assembly Center (213); Jackson, MS
January 17, 2022; 7:30 pm		Texas Southern	W 61–58	4–12 (2–3)	19 – Lewis	12 – McKinnis	4 – 2 Tied	Williams Assembly Center (500); Jackson, MS
January 22, 2022; 3:00 pm		at Bethune–Cookman	L 50–55	4–13 (2–4)	16 – McKinnis	9 – 2 Tied	4 – James	Moore Gymnasium (351); Daytona Beach, FL
January 24, 2022; 6:30 pm		at Florida A&M	L 64–67	4–14 (2–5)	13 – Brown	13 – McKinnis	2 – 3 Tied	Al Lawson Center; Tallahassee, FL
January 29, 2022; 5:30 pm		vs. Grambling State; Bridge Builder Classic	L 64–73	4–15 (2–6)	15 – McKinnis	16 – McKinnis	4 – Evans	Mitchell Center (1,917); Mobile, AL
January 31, 2022; 7:30 pm		Southern	L 64–75	4–16 (2–7)	16 – Moore	9 – Jones	8 – James	Williams Assembly Center (850); Jackson, MS
February 5, 2022; 5:30 pm		at Mississippi Valley State	W 69–65	5–16 (3–7)	28 – Lewis	12 – Jones	8 – James	Harrison HPER Complex (4,689); Itta Bena, MS
February 7, 2022; 7:30 pm		at Arkansas–Pine Bluff	W 60–47	6–16 (4–7)	14 – 2 Tied	12 – Lewis	4 – James	H.O. Clemmons Arena (1,861); Pine Bluff, AR
February 12, 2022; 5:30 pm		Florida A&M	W 60–56	7–16 (5–7)	19 – Lewis	9 – Lewis	3 – Evans	Williams Assembly Center (2,745); Jackson, MS
February 14, 2022; 7:30 pm		Bethune–Cookman	W 71–51	8–16 (6–7)	22 – Evans	10 – Evans	5 – Wilson	Williams Assembly Center (1,318); Jackson, MS
February 19, 2022; 5:30 pm		at Alcorn State	L 60–61	8–17 (6–8)	26 – Hicks	6 – Tied	6 – James	Davey Whitney Complex (3,500); Lorman, MS
February 26, 2022; 8:00 pm		at Texas Southern	L 66–81	8–18 (6–9)	12 – Taylor	11 – Lewis	4 – James	H&PE Arena (2,456); Houston, TX
February 28, 2022; 7:30 pm		at Prairie View A&M	W 59–53	9–18 (7–9)	18 – Lewis	13 – McKinnis	4 – James	William J. Nicks Building (1,149); Prairie View, TX
March 3, 2022; 7:30 pm		Arkansas–Pine Bluff	W 87–79	10–18 (8–9)	24 – Evans	14 – McKinnis	7 – Evans	Williams Assembly Center (2,190); Jackson, MS
March 5, 2022; 5:30 pm		Mississippi Valley State	W 76–69	11–18 (9–9)	16 – James	12 – McKinnis	4 – James	Williams Assembly Center (2,997); Jackson, MS
SWAC tournament
March 9, 2022; 2:00 pm, ESPN+	(7)	vs. (2) Texas Southern; Quarterfinals	L 50–54	11–19	15 – McKinnis	13 – McKinnis	3 – Taylor	Bartow Arena (266); Birmingham, AL
*Non-conference game. ^{#}Rankings from AP Poll. (#) Tournament seedings in parentheses. All times are in Central.
