= 2021–22 Prairie View A&M Panthers basketball team =

American college basketball season

2021–22 Prairie View A&M Panthers basketball
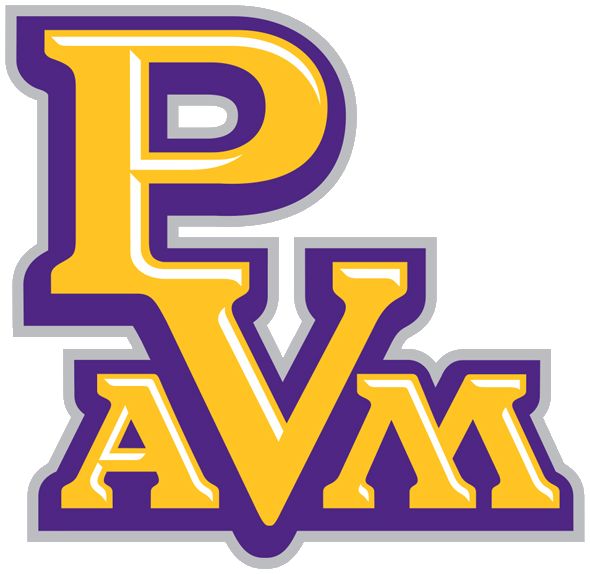
- Conference: Southwestern Athletic Conference
- West Division
- Record: 8–19 (8–10 SWAC)
- Head coach: Byron Smith (6th season)
- Assistant coaches: Spencer Robertson; Noah Croak; James Stafford
- Home arena: William Nicks Building

2021–22 SWAC men's basketball standings
	Conf.				Overall
Team	W		L	PCT	W		L	PCT
Alcorn State	14	–	4	.778	17	–	17	.500
Texas Southern †	13	–	5	.722	19	–	13	.594
Southern	12	–	6	.667	17	–	14	.548
Florida A&M	11	–	7	.611	13	–	17	.433
Alabama A&M	10	–	8	.556	12	–	18	.400
Grambling State	9	–	9	.500	12	–	20	.375
Jackson State	9	–	9	.500	11	–	19	.367
Prairie View A&M	8	–	10	.444	8	–	19	.296
Alabama State	8	–	10	.444	9	–	21	.300
Bethune–Cookman	7	–	11	.389	9	–	21	.300
Arkansas–Pine Bluff	5	–	13	.278	7	–	24	.226
Mississippi Valley State	2	–	16	.111	2	–	26	.071
† 2022 SWAC tournament winner

The 2021–22 Prairie View A&M Panthers basketball team represented Prairie View A&M University in the 2021–22 NCAA Division I men's basketball season. The Panthers, led by sixth-year head coach Byron Smith, played their home games at the William Nicks Building in Prairie View, Texas as members of the Southwestern Athletic Conference.

== Previous season ==
In a season limited due to the ongoing COVID-19 pandemic, the Panthers finished the 2020–21 season 16–5, 13–0 in SWAC play to finish as the regular season co-champions, alongside Jackson State. In the SWAC tournament, they defeated Mississippi Valley State and Grambling State before being upset in the championship game by Texas Southern.

== Roster ==
2021–22 Prairie View A&M Panthers men's basketball team
Players
Coaches

Pos.	#	Name	Height	Weight	Year	Hometown
F	0	Jerroda Briscoe	6 ft 8 in (2.03 m)	185 lb (84 kg)	Sr	St. Petersburg, FL
PG	1	DeAngelo Ware	6 ft 0 in (1.83 m)	175 lb (79 kg)	So	Evansville, IN
G	2	Jock Hughes	6 ft 4 in (1.93 m)	177 lb (80 kg)	So	Houston, TX
PF	3	Markedric Bell	6 ft 8 in (2.03 m)	200 lb (91 kg)	GS	Starkville, MS
G	4	Christian Guess	6 ft 7 in (2.01 m)	195 lb (88 kg)	Jr	Cleveland, OH
G	5	D'Rell Roberts	6 ft 7 in (2.01 m)	190 lb (86 kg)	Sr	Dallas, TX
G	10	Jeremiah Gambrell, Jr.	6 ft 3 in (1.91 m)	180 lb (82 kg)	Jr	Houston, TX
G	11	DeWayne Cox	6 ft 2 in (1.88 m)	190 lb (86 kg)	GS	Ripley, MS
G	12	Faite Williams	6 ft 2 in (1.88 m)	175 lb (79 kg)	Sr	Dickinson, TX
F	13	Jeremiah Kendall	6 ft 6 in (1.98 m)	205 lb (93 kg)	So	Bronx, NY
G	15	Miles McDougal	5 ft 10 in (1.78 m)	185 lb (84 kg)	Sr	Dallas, TX
G	21	Will Douglas	6 ft 5 in (1.96 m)	195 lb (88 kg)	GS	Memphis, TN
G	22	Jawaun Daniels	6 ft 7 in (2.01 m)	205 lb (93 kg)	Sr	Harlem, NY
PF	23	Brian Myles	6 ft 7 in (2.01 m)	200 lb (91 kg)	Fr	Shreveport, LA
F	24	Elijah Ifejeh	6 ft 8 in (2.03 m)	236 lb (107 kg)	GS	Montreal, Canada
G	30	Danario Edgar, II	6 ft 1 in (1.85 m)	165 lb (75 kg)	Jr	Houston, TX
SG	31	Tyler Poindexter	6 ft 5 in (1.96 m)	205 lb (93 kg)	So	Miami, FL
PG	32	Patrick Neal	6 ft 3 in (1.91 m)	200 lb (91 kg)	Fr	Houston, TX

Head coach

- Byron Smith (Houston)

Assistant coach(es)

- Spencer Robertson (Wichita State)
- Noah Croak (Indiana)
- James Stafford

Legend

- (C) Team captain
- (S) Suspended
- (I) Ineligible
- (W) Walk-on
- Injured
- Current redshirt

Roster
Last update: October 30, 2021

== Schedule and results ==
Date time, TV	Rank^{#}	Opponent^{#}	Result	Record	High points	High rebounds	High assists	Site (attendance) city, state
Non-conference regular season
November 9, 2021*; 6:00 pm		at Saint Mary's	L 68–87	0–1	15 – 2 Tied	5 – Daniels	2 – Roberts	University Credit Union Pavilion (2,283); Moraga, CA
November 11, 2021*; 9:30 pm		at San Francisco	L 76–92	0–2	25 – Daniels	5 – 2 Tied	2 – 2 Tied	War Memorial Gymnasium (1,233); San Francisco, CA
November 13, 2021*; 7:00 pm, BTN		vs. No. 6 Michigan; Coaches vs. Racism	L 49–77	0–3	15 – Douglas	8 – Daniels	2 – Douglas	Capital One Arena (1,476); Washington, D.C.
November 14, 2021*; 2:00 pm, ESPN+		at Oklahoma State	L 59–72	0–4	27 – Roberts	7 – 2 Tied	4 – Roberts	Gallagher-Iba Arena (7,346); Stillwater, OK
November 15, 2021*; 7:00 pm, ESPN+		at Texas Tech	L 49–84	0–5	12 – Roberts	4 – 2 Tied	3 – Roberts	United Supermarkets Arena (12,419); Lubbock, TX
November 17, 2021*; 8:00 pm, ESPN+		at Grand Canyon	L 64–91	0–6	18 – Roberts	6 – Cox	2 – 2 Tied	GCU Arena (6,854); Phoenix, AZ
November 27, 2021*; 7:00 pm		at Loyola Marymount	L 80–83	0–7	31 – Daniels	5 – Daniels	6 – Gambrell	Gersten Pavilion (677); Los Angeles, CA
November 30, 2021*; 7:00 pm		at South Dakota State	L 90–99	0–8	24 – Douglas	6 – Guess	7 – Gambrell	Frost Arena (1,296); Brookings, SD
December 10, 2021*		at Boise State	L 60–97	0–9	21 – Roberts	5 – Bell	1 – 3 Tied	ExtraMile Arena (6,646); Boise, ID
December 22, 2021*; 6:00 pm		at Wichita State	L 66–102	0–10	22 – Gambrell	6 – Myles	2 – 3 Tied	Charles Koch Arena (8,128); Wichita, KS
December 28, 2021*; 12:00 pm		at Valparaiso	Canceled due to COVID-19 protocols					Athletics–Recreation Center; Valparaiso, IN
December 30, 2021*; 4:00 pm, BTN		at Northwestern	Canceled due to COVID-19 protocols					Welsh–Ryan Arena; Evanston, IL
January 1, 2022*; 2:00 pm		North American	Canceled due to COVID-19 protocols					William Nicks Building; Prairie View, TX
SWAC regular season
January 3, 2022; 7:30 pm		at Grambling State	L 0–2 (Forfeit)	0–10 (0–1)	–	–	–	Fredrick C. Hobdy Assembly Center; Grambling, LA
January 5, 2022; 7:30 pm		at Southern	L 0–2 (Forfeit)	0–10 (0–2)	–	–	–	F. G. Clark Center; Baton Rouge, LA
January 8, 2022; 5:30 pm		Mississippi Valley State	L 82–84 ^{OT}	0–11 (0–3)	21 – 2 Tied	12 – Kendall	5 – Gambrell	William Nicks Building; Prairie View, TX
January 10, 2022; 7:30 pm		Arkansas–Pine Bluff	W 75–58	1–11 (1–3)	18 – Cox	6 – 2 Tied	7 – Gambrell	William Nicks Building (257); Prairie View, TX
January 15, 2022; 2:00 pm		at Jackson State	L 64–75	1–12 (1–4)	16 – 2 Tied	6 – Daniels	1 – 2 Tied	Williams Assembly Center (213); Jackson, MS
January 17, 2022; 7:30 pm		at Alcorn State	W 74–73	2–12 (2–4)	21 – Douglas	9 – Daniels	4 – 2 Tied	Davey Whitney Complex (264); Lorman, MS
January 22, 2022; 5:30 pm		Alabama State	W 70–67	3–12 (3–4)	26 – Gambrell	11 – Bell	6 – Gambrell	William Nicks Building (1,206); Prairie View, TX
January 24, 2022; 7:30 pm		Alabama A&M	W 72–48	4–12 (4–4)	30 – Daniels	7 – Daniels	4 – Cox	William Nicks Building (1,282); Prairie View, TX
January 29, 2022; 5:30 pm		Texas Southern	L 74–75 ^{OT}	4–13 (4–5)	25 – Douglas	10 – Daniels	6 – Gambrell	William Nicks Building (3,047); Prairie View, TX
February 5, 2022; 5:30 pm		at Bethune–Cookman	L 67–68	4–14 (4–6)	20 – Daniels	9 – Kendall	2 – Douglas	Moore Gymnasium (378); Daytona Beach, FL
February 7, 2022; 7:30 pm		at Florida A&M	L 60–61	4–15 (4–7)	13 – Bell	9 – Daniels	3 – Roberts	Al Lawson Center (2,087); Tallahassee, FL
February 12, 2022; 5:30 pm		Southern	W 84–77	5–15 (5–7)	25 – Gambrell	11 – Daniels	8 – Daniels	William Nicks Building (824); Prairie View, TX
February 14, 2022; 7:30 pm		Grambling State	W 71–70	6–15 (6–7)	23 – Douglas	12 – Daniels	5 – Daniels	William Nicks Building; Prairie View, TX
February 19, 2022; 5:30 pm		at Arkansas–Pine Bluff	W 92–84	7–15 (7–7)	31 – Gambrell	7 – Daniels	5 – Douglas	K. L. Johnson Complex (1,628); Pine Bluff, AR
February 21, 2022; 5:30 pm		at Mississippi Valley State	W 69–64	8–15 (8–7)	22 – Gambrell	7 – Gambrell	5 – Daniels	Harrison HPER Complex (3,702); Itta Bena, MS
February 26, 2022; 5:30 pm		Alcorn State	L 69–72	8–16 (8–8)	23 – Daniels	10 – Daniels	4 – Daniels	William Nicks Building (0); Prairie View, TX
February 28, 2022; 7:30 pm		Jackson State	L 53–59	8–17 (8–9)	28 – Daniels	8 – Daniels	2 – Tied	William Nicks Building (1,149); Prairie View, TX
March 5, 2022; 5:30 pm		at Texas Southern	L 77–78	8–18 (8–10)	27 – Gambrell	8 – Daniels	3 – Douglas	H&PE Arena (7,284); Houston, TX
SWAC tournament
March 9, 2022; 8:30 pm, ESPN+	(8)	vs. (1) Alcorn State; Quarterfinals	L 63–64 ^{OT}	8–19	20 – Gambrell	16 – Daniels	5 – Daniels	Bartow Arena (299); Birmingham, AL
*Non-conference game. ^{#}Rankings from AP Poll. (#) Tournament seedings in parentheses. All times are in Central.
