= 2021–22 Alabama A&M Bulldogs basketball team =

American college basketball season

2021–22 Alabama A&M Bulldogs basketball
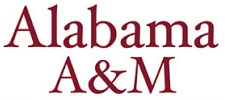
- Conference: Southwestern Athletic Conference
- East Division
- Record: 12–18 (10–8 SWAC)
- Head coach: Dylan Howard (4th season)
- Assistant coaches: Emmanuel Tommy; Johnnie Williams
- Home arena: Elmore Gymnasium

2021–22 SWAC men's basketball standings
	Conf.				Overall
Team	W		L	PCT	W		L	PCT
Alcorn State	14	–	4	.778	17	–	17	.500
Texas Southern †	13	–	5	.722	19	–	13	.594
Southern	12	–	6	.667	17	–	14	.548
Florida A&M	11	–	7	.611	13	–	17	.433
Alabama A&M	10	–	8	.556	12	–	18	.400
Grambling State	9	–	9	.500	12	–	20	.375
Jackson State	9	–	9	.500	11	–	19	.367
Prairie View A&M	8	–	10	.444	8	–	19	.296
Alabama State	8	–	10	.444	9	–	21	.300
Bethune–Cookman	7	–	11	.389	9	–	21	.300
Arkansas–Pine Bluff	5	–	13	.278	7	–	24	.226
Mississippi Valley State	2	–	16	.111	2	–	26	.071
† 2022 SWAC tournament winner

The 2021–22 Alabama A&M Bulldogs basketball team represented Alabama A&M University in the 2021–22 NCAA Division I men's basketball season. The Bulldogs, led by fourth-year head coach Dylan Howard, played their home games at the Elmore Gymnasium in Normal, Alabama as members of the Southwestern Athletic Conference (SWAC). The Bulldogs finished the season 12–18, 10–8 in SWAC play, to finish in fifth place. In the SWAC tournament, they defeated Florida A&M before falling to Alcorn State in the semifinals.

This was the Bulldogs' final season at the Elmore Gymnasium, with the new Alabama A&M Events Center set to open for the 2022–23 season.

This was also Dylan Howard's final season as head coach at Alabama A&M, as the school parted ways with him on March 22, 2022. Otis Hughley Jr. was named as his replacement on April 18.

== Previous season ==
The Bulldogs finished the 2020–21 season 6–9, 4–9 in SWAC play, to finish in seventh place. However, they were ineligible for postseason play due to APR violations.

== Roster ==
2021–22 Alabama A&M Bulldogs men's basketball team
Players
Coaches

Pos.	#	Name	Height	Weight	Year	Hometown
G	0	DJ Fairley	6 ft 2 in (1.88 m)	190 lb (86 kg)	Fr	Hoover, AL
F	1	Myles Parker	6 ft 7 in (2.01 m)	210 lb (95 kg)	Sr	Huntsville, AL
G	2	Jevon Tatum	6 ft 1 in (1.85 m)	180 lb (82 kg)	So	Snellville, GA
G	3	Cameron Tucker	6 ft 1 in (1.85 m)	170 lb (77 kg)	Jr	Birmingham, AL
G	4	Jabiri Smith	6 ft 5 in (1.96 m)	205 lb (93 kg)	Fr	Duluth, GA
F	5	Jalen Johnson	6 ft 7 in (2.01 m)	230 lb (104 kg)	Jr	Indianapolis, IN
G	10	Garrett Hicks	6 ft 0 in (1.83 m)	160 lb (73 kg)	Jr	Madison, AL
C	11	Abba Lawal	7 ft 0 in (2.13 m)	210 lb (95 kg)	So	Kaduna, Nigeria
G/F	12	Brandon Powell	6 ft 3 in (1.91 m)	205 lb (93 kg)	Sr	Huntsville, AL
G	13	Alec Hickman	6 ft 4 in (1.93 m)	190 lb (86 kg)	GS	Fresno, CA
G/F	15	Dailin Smith	6 ft 6 in (1.98 m)	185 lb (84 kg)	So	Colorado Springs, CO
G	22	London Riley	6 ft 3 in (1.91 m)	175 lb (79 kg)	So	Atlanta, GA
F	23	Anjay Cortez	6 ft 8 in (2.03 m)	185 lb (84 kg)	So	Charlotte, NC
G	24	Eric Lee	6 ft 4 in (1.93 m)	195 lb (88 kg)	RS Fr	Tampa, FL
C	34/20	EJ Williams	6 ft 10 in (2.08 m)	275 lb (125 kg)	Jr	Cincinnati, OH

Head coach

- Dylan Howard (UAB)

Assistant coach(es)

- Emmanuel Tommy (Western Michigan)
- Johnnie Williams (Morehead State)

Legend

- (C) Team captain
- (S) Suspended
- (I) Ineligible
- (W) Walk-on
- Injured
- Current redshirt

Roster
Last update: November 13, 2021

== Schedule and results ==
Date time, TV	Rank^{#}	Opponent^{#}	Result	Record	High points	High rebounds	High assists	Site (attendance) city, state
Non-conference regular season
November 9, 2021*; 7:00 p.m.		vs. Tennessee State	W 82–73	1–0	17 – Johnson	12 – Johnson	8 – Tucker	Von Braun Center (2,561); Huntsville, AL
November 13, 2021*; 4:00 p.m., ESPN+		at Jacksonville State	L 47–70	1–1	11 – 3 tied	6 – Hicks	3 – Williams	Pete Mathews Coliseum (749); Jacksonville, AL
November 16, 2021*; 7:00 p.m., ESPN+		at Cincinnati	L 66–89	1–2	30 – Johnson	7 – Johnson	4 – Tucker	Fifth Third Arena (9,816); Cincinnati, OH
November 21, 2021*; 2:00 p.m., ESPN+		at UAB	L 41–86	1–3	9 – Johnson	8 – Johnson	2 – 2 tied	Bartow Arena (2,918); Birmingham, AL
November 24, 2021*; 4:00 p.m., ESPN+		at Western Kentucky	L 62–88	1–4	21 – Hicks	5 – Smith	3 – Hicks	E. A. Diddle Arena (3,152); Bowling Green, KY
December 8, 2021*; 6:00 p.m., ESPN+		at North Alabama	L 46–56	1–5	16 – Hicks	7 – Johnson	3 – Tucker	Flowers Hall (633); Florence, AL
December 11, 2021*; 6:00 p.m.		at Samford	L 50–52	1–6	18 – Johnson	8 – Johnson	5 – Tucker	Pete Hanna Center (1,841); Homewood, AL
December 14, 2021*; 6:00 p.m., ESPN+		at Troy	L 57–66	1–7	15 – Johnson	8 – Cortez	7 – Tucker	Trojan Arena (1,567); Troy, AL
December 18, 2021*; 1:00 p.m., ESPN3		at Indiana State	L 43–67	1–8	10 – Hicks	7 – Tucker	4 – Tucker	Hulman Center (3,011); Terre Haute, IN
December 23, 2021*; 7:00 p.m., ACCN		at Georgia Tech	Canceled due to COVID-19 issues					McCamish Pavilion; Atlanta, GA
December 30, 2021*; 7:00 p.m., ESPN+		at Lipscomb	L 63–66	1–9	19 – Hicks	7 – Williams	5 – Tucker	Allen Arena (1,175); Nashville, TN
SWAC regular season
January 3, 2022		Arkansas–Pine Bluff	W 70–50	2–9 (1–0)	18 – Johnson	8 – Johnson	6 – Tucker	Elmore Gymnasium (842); Normal, AL
January 5, 2022; 7:30 p.m., YouTube		at Mississippi Valley State	W 72–67	3–9 (2–0)	25 – Johnson	14 – Johnson	4 – Tucker	Harrison HPER Complex (395); Itta Bena, MS
January 8, 2022		Alcorn State	L 71–78	3–10 (2–1)	22 – Hicks	12 – Johnson	3 – Powell	Elmore Gymnasium (956); Normal, AL
January 10, 2022; 6:30 p.m.		Jackson State	W 60–58	4–10 (3–1)	22 – Hicks	9 – 2 tied	4 – Williams	Elmore Gymnasium (767); Normal, AL
January 15, 2022; 4:30 p.m.		at Alabama State	L 55–59	4–11 (3–2)	16 – Johnson	5 – 2 tied	4 – Tucker	Dunn–Oliver Acadome (1,150); Montgomery, AL
January 22, 2022; 7:30 p.m.		at Texas Southern	L 44–78	4–12 (3–3)	11 – 2 tied	8 – Lee	2 – 2 tied	H&PE Arena (1,042); Houston, TX
January 24, 2022; 7:30 p.m.		at Prairie View A&M	L 48–72	4–13 (3–4)	15 – Johnson	11 – Lawal	3 – Tucker	William Nicks Building (1,282); Prairie View, TX
January 29, 2022; 2:00 p.m.		Florida A&M	L 60–65	4–14 (3–5)	26 – Johnson	5 – Smith	7 – Tucker	Elmore Gymnasium (1,706); Normal, AL
January 31, 2022; 5:00 p.m.		Bethune–Cookman	W 67–52	5–14 (4–5)	18 – 2 tied	9 – Johnson	5 – Tucker	Elmore Gymnasium (1,130); Normal, AL
February 5, 2022; 5:00 p.m.		at Southern	L 64–73	5–15 (4–6)	25 – Hicks	10 – Johnson	5 – Tucker	F. G. Clark Center (4,155); Baton Rouge, LA
February 7, 2022; 5:30 p.m., ESPNU		at Grambling State	L 50–58	5–16 (4–7)	20 – Johnson	7 – 2 tied	3 – Smith	Fredrick C. Hobdy Assembly Center (3,271); Grambling, LA
February 12, 2022; 2:00 p.m.		Mississippi Valley State	W 94–92 ^{4OT}	6–16 (5–7)	28 – Tucker	13 – Johnson	7 – Tucker	Elmore Gymnasium (1,700); Normal, AL
February 14, 2022; 5:00 p.m.		Arkansas–Pine Bluff	W 74–69	7–16 (6–7)	21 – Cortez	9 – Cortez	5 – Williams	Elmore Gymnasium (788); Normal, AL
February 19, 2022; 3:00 p.m.		at Bethune–Cookman	W 62–60	8–16 (7–7)	15 – Smith	7 – Cortez	4 – Tucker	Moore Gymnasium (671); Daytona Beach, FL
February 21, 2022; 6:30 p.m.		at Florida A&M	W 71–63	9–16 (8–7)	18 – Tucker	10 – Johnson	1 – 5 tied	Al Lawson Center (2,287); Tallahassee, FL
February 26, 2022; 4:00 p.m.		Alabama State	W 80–65	10–16 (9–7)	18 – Smith	9 – Smith	7 – Tucker	Elmore Gymnasium (2,400); Normal, AL
March 3, 2022; 7:30 p.m.		Grambling State	W 71–63	11–16 (10–7)	21 – Johnson	10 – Johnson	4 – Tucker	Elmore Gymnasium (856); Normal, AL
March 5, 2022; 4:00 p.m.		Southern	L 49–50	11–17 (10–7)	16 – Johnson	8 – Johnson	2 – Tucker	Elmore Gymnasium (998); Normal, AL
SWAC tournament
March 10, 2022; 8:30 p.m., ESPN+	(5)	vs. (4) Florida A&M; Quarterfinals	W 61–56	12–17	15 – Johnson	9 – Johnson	5 – Tucker	Bartow Arena (777); Birmingham, AL
March 11, 2022; 8:30 p.m., ESPN+	(5)	vs. (1) Alcorn State; Semifinals	L 64–69	12–18	20 – Johnson	11 – Johnson	3 – Tucker	Bartow Arena (579); Birmingham, AL
*Non-conference game. ^{#}Rankings from AP poll. (#) Tournament seedings in parentheses. All times are in Central.
