= 2022 SWAC men's basketball tournament =

- Classification: Division I
- Season: 2021–22
- Teams: 8
- Site: Bartow Arena; Birmingham, Alabama
- Champions: Texas Southern (10th title)
- Winning coach: Johnny Jones (2nd title)
- Television: ESPN+, ESPNU

2021–22 SWAC men's basketball standings
	Conf.				Overall
Team	W		L	PCT	W		L	PCT
Alcorn State	14	–	4	.778	17	–	17	.500
Texas Southern †	13	–	5	.722	19	–	13	.594
Southern	12	–	6	.667	17	–	14	.548
Florida A&M	11	–	7	.611	13	–	17	.433
Alabama A&M	10	–	8	.556	12	–	18	.400
Grambling State	9	–	9	.500	12	–	20	.375
Jackson State	9	–	9	.500	11	–	19	.367
Prairie View A&M	8	–	10	.444	8	–	19	.296
Alabama State	8	–	10	.444	9	–	21	.300
Bethune–Cookman	7	–	11	.389	9	–	21	.300
Arkansas–Pine Bluff	5	–	13	.278	7	–	24	.226
Mississippi Valley State	2	–	16	.111	2	–	26	.071
† 2022 SWAC tournament winner

The 2022 SWAC men's basketball tournament was the postseason men's basketball tournament for the 2021–22 season in the Southwestern Athletic Conference (SWAC). The tournament was held March 9–12, 2022. The tournament winner, the Texas Southern Tigers, received the conference's automatic invitation to the 2022 NCAA Division I men's basketball tournament. The tournament was sponsored by Cricket Wireless.

== Seeds ==
Teams will be seeded by record within the conference, with a tie–breaker system to seed teams with identical conference records. Only the top eight teams in the conference will qualify for the tournament.

Seed	School	Conference	Tiebreaker
1	Alcorn State	14–4	
2	Texas Southern	13–5	
3	Southern	12–6	
4	Florida A&M	11–7	
5	Alabama A&M	10–8	
6	Grambling State	9–9	1–0 vs. Jackson State
7	Jackson State	9–9	0–1 vs. Grambling State
8	Prairie View A&M	8–10	1–0 vs. Alabama State
DNQ	Alabama State	8–10	0–1 vs. Prairie View A&M
DNQ	Bethune–Cookman	7–11	
DNQ	Arkansas–Pine Bluff	5–13	
DNQ	Mississippi Valley State	2–16	

== Schedule ==
Game	Time*	Matchup^{#}	Score	Television
Quarterfinals – Wednesday, March 9, 2022
1	2:00 p.m.	No. 2 Texas Southern vs. No. 7 Jackson State	54–50	ESPN+
2	8:30 p.m.	No. 1 Alcorn State vs. No. 8 Prairie View A&M	64–63 (OT)	ESPN+
Quarterfinals – Thursday, March 10, 2022
3	2:00 p.m.	No. 3 Southern vs. No. 6 Grambling State	58–60	ESPN+
4	8:30 p.m.	No. 4 Florida A&M vs. No. 5 Alabama A&M	56–61	ESPN+
Semifinals – Friday, March 11, 2022
5	2:00 p.m.	No. 2 Texas Southern vs. No. 6 Grambling State	73–54	ESPN+
6	8:30 p.m.	No. 1 Alcorn State vs. No. 5 Alabama A&M	69-64	ESPN+
Championship – Saturday, March 12, 2022
7	5:00 p.m.	No. 2 Texas Southern vs. No. 1 Alcorn State	87-62	ESPNU
*Game times in CDT. #-Rankings denote tournament seeding.

== Bracket ==
Quarterfinals; March 9–10, 2022; ESPN+
1	Alcorn State	64*
8	Prairie View A&M	63
4	Florida A&M	56
5	Alabama A&M	61
2	Texas Southern	54
7	Jackson State	50
3	Southern	58
6	Grambling State	60

Semifinals; March 11, 2022; ESPN+
1	Alcorn State	69
5	Alabama A&M	64
2	Texas Southern	73
6	Grambling State	54

Championship; March 12, 2022; ESPNU
1	Alcorn State	62
2	Texas Southern	87
