= 2021–22 Texas Southern Tigers basketball team =

American college basketball season

2021–22 Texas Southern Tigers basketball
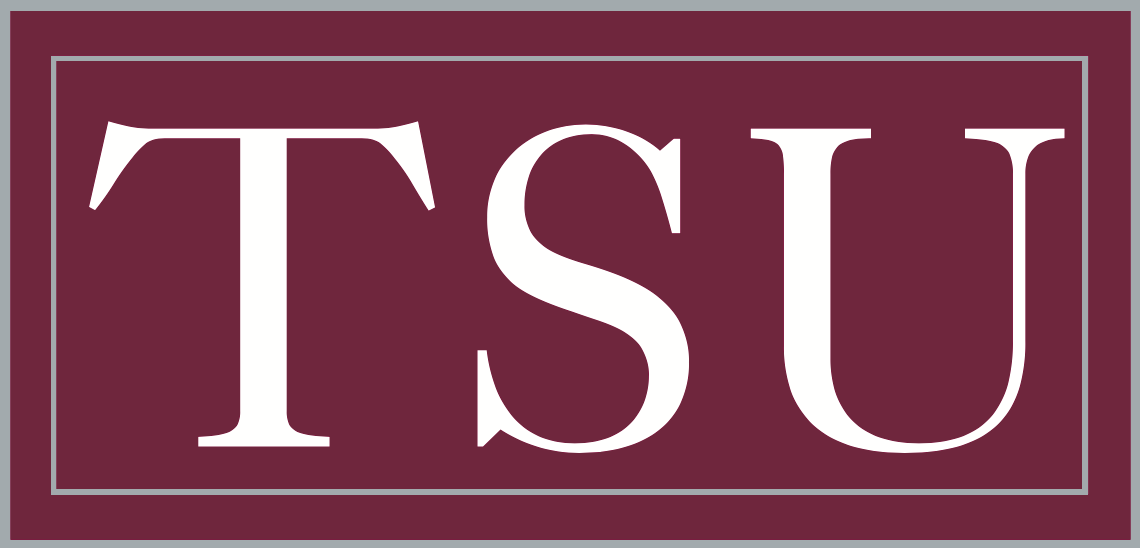

SWAC tournament champions

NCAA tournament, First round
- Conference: Southwestern Athletic Conference
- West Division
- Record: 19–13 (13–5 SWAC)
- Head coach: Johnny Jones (4th season)
- Assistant coaches: Randy Peele; Shyrone Chatman; Josh White
- Home arena: Health and Physical Education Arena

2021–22 SWAC men's basketball standings
| | Conf. | | | | Overall |
| Team | W | | L | PCT | W | | L | PCT |
|---|---|---|---|---|---|---|---|---|
| Alcorn State | 14 | – | 4 | .778 | 17 | – | 17 | .500 |
| Texas Southern † | 13 | – | 5 | .722 | 19 | – | 13 | .594 |
| Southern | 12 | – | 6 | .667 | 17 | – | 14 | .548 |
| Florida A&M | 11 | – | 7 | .611 | 13 | – | 17 | .433 |
| Alabama A&M | 10 | – | 8 | .556 | 12 | – | 18 | .400 |
| Grambling State | 9 | – | 9 | .500 | 12 | – | 20 | .375 |
| Jackson State | 9 | – | 9 | .500 | 11 | – | 19 | .367 |
| Prairie View A&M | 8 | – | 10 | .444 | 8 | – | 19 | .296 |
| Alabama State | 8 | – | 10 | .444 | 9 | – | 21 | .300 |
| Bethune–Cookman | 7 | – | 11 | .389 | 9 | – | 21 | .300 |
| Arkansas–Pine Bluff | 5 | – | 13 | .278 | 7 | – | 24 | .226 |
| Mississippi Valley State | 2 | – | 16 | .111 | 2 | – | 26 | .071 |
† 2022 SWAC tournament winner

The 2021–22 Texas Southern Tigers basketball team represented Texas Southern University during the 2021–22 NCAA Division I men's basketball season. The Tigers are led by fourth-year head coach Johnny Jones and played their home games at the Health and Physical Education Arena in Houston, Texas as members of the West Division of the Southwestern Athletic Conference (SWAC). They finished the season 19–13, 13–5 in SWAC play, to finish in second place. As the No. 2 seed, they defeated Jackson State, Grambling State and Alcorn State to win the SWAC tournament. They received the conference’s automatic bid to the NCAA tournament as the No. 16 seed in the Midwest Region, where they defeated Texas A&M–Corpus Christi in the First Four before losing in the first round to eventual national champion Kansas.

== Previous season ==
In a season limited due to the ongoing COVID-19 pandemic, the Tigers finished the 2020–21 season 17–9 overall, 10–3 in SWAC play, to finish third place in the conference. The Tigers defeated Alcorn State, Jackson State and Prairie View A&M to win the SWAC tournament, their ninth SWAC championship. As a result, the Tigers received the conference's automatic bid to the NCAA tournament as the No. 16 seed in the East region. There they defeated Mount St. Mary's before losing to No. 1-seeded Michigan in the first round.

== Offseason ==
=== Departures ===
| Name | Pos. | Height | Weight | Year | Hometown | Reason for departure |
|---|---|---|---|---|---|---|
| Chris Baldwin | F | 6' 9" | 220 | Senior | Springfield, MA | Transferred to Central Michigan |
| Quinton Brigham | G | 6' 5" | 215 | Senior | Fort Worth, TX | Entered transfer portal |
| Ashton McClelland | G | 6' 1" | 155 | Sophomore (redshirt) | Houston, TX | Entered transfer portal |
| Ja'Mare Redus | G | 5' 11" | 170 | Sophomore | Houston, TX | |
| Michael Weathers | G | 6' 3" | 175 | Senior | Roeland Park, KS | Transferred to SMU |

=== Incoming transfers ===
| Name | Pos. | Height | Weight | Year | Hometown | Previous school |
|---|---|---|---|---|---|---|
| Grayson Carter | F | 6' 10" | 225 | Junior (redshirt) | Dallas, TX | UT Arlington |
| Kehlin Farooq | G | 6' 5" | 180 | Sophomore | Houston, TX | Hampton |
| Brison Gresham | F | 6' 9" | 240 | Senior | New Orleans, LA | Houston |
| PJ Henry | G | 5' 10" | 175 | Junior | Houston, TX | Hartford |
| AJ Lawson | G | 6' 5" | 205 | Graduate student | Bryan, TX | McNeese State |

=== Recruiting class ===
College recruiting information
| Name | Hometown | School | Height | Weight | Commit date |
|---|---|---|---|---|---|
| Davon Barnes; F | Memphis, TN | Collierville | 6 ft 5 in (1.96 m) | 215 lb (98 kg) | – |
| Davon Barnes; F | Recruit ratings: Rivals: 247Sports: ESPN: (NR) | | | | |
| Kolby Granger; G | Missouri City, TX | Ridge Point | 6 ft 5 in (1.96 m) | 180 lb (82 kg) | – |
| Kolby Granger; G | Recruit ratings: Rivals: 247Sports: ESPN: (NR) | | | | |
| Shaqir O'Neal; SF | Los Angeles, CA | Union Grove | 6 ft 6 in (1.98 m) | 185 lb (84 kg) | May 1, 2021 |
| Shaqir O'Neal; SF | Recruit ratings: Rivals: 247Sports: ESPN: (76) | | | | |
Overall recruit ranking:
Note: In many cases, Scout, Rivals, 247Sports, On3, and ESPN may conflict in their listings of height and weight.; In these cases, the average was taken. ESPN grades are on a 100-point scale.; Sources: "2021 Texas Southern Tigers Recruiting Class". ESPN.; "2021 Team Ranking". Rivals.

== Roster ==
2021–22 Texas Southern Tigers men's basketball team
Players
Coaches

| Pos. | # | Name | Height | Weight | Year | Previous school | Hometown |
|---|---|---|---|---|---|---|---|
| F | 0 | Yahuza Rasas | 6 ft 7 in (2.01 m) | 200 lb (91 kg) | Sr | Mineral Area College | St. Louis, MO |
| F | 1 | Galen Alexander | 6 ft 6 in (1.98 m) | 220 lb (100 kg) | GS | Georgetown | Breaux Bridge, LA |
| G | 2 | AJ Lawson | 6 ft 5 in (1.96 m) | 205 lb (93 kg) | GS | McNeese State | Bryan, TX |
| G | 3 | PJ Henry | 5 ft 10 in (1.78 m) | 175 lb (79 kg) | Jr | Hartford | Houston, TX |
| G | 4 | Bryson Etienne | 6 ft 3 in (1.91 m) | 190 lb (86 kg) | Sr | Temple College | Houston, TX |
| F | 5 | Joirdon Nicholas | 6 ft 9 in (2.06 m) | 220 lb (100 kg) | Sr | Stephen F. Austin | Pearland, TX |
| G | 11 | Jordan Gilliam | 6 ft 5 in (1.96 m) | 175 lb (79 kg) | RS Sr | UC Riverside | Houston, TX |
| G | 12 | John Jones | 6 ft 0 in (1.83 m) | 165 lb (75 kg) | GS | Nevada | Baton Rouge, LA |
| G | 14 | Kolby Granger | 6 ft 5 in (1.96 m) | 180 lb (82 kg) | Fr | Ridge Point HS | Missouri City, TX |
| F | 15 | Justin Hopkins | 6 ft 5 in (1.96 m) | 205 lb (93 kg) | GS | Samford | Huntsville, AL |
| G | 20 | Kehlin Farooq | 6 ft 5 in (1.96 m) | 180 lb (82 kg) | So | Hampton | Houston, TX |
| F | 23 | Shaqir O'Neal | 6 ft 7 in (2.01 m) | 185 lb (84 kg) | Fr | Union Grove HS | Los Angeles, CA |
| F | 24 | John III Walker | 6 ft 9 in (2.06 m) | 200 lb (91 kg) | Sr | Texas A&M | Houston, TX |
| F | 25 | Grayson Carter | 6 ft 10 in (2.08 m) | 225 lb (102 kg) | RS Jr | UT Arlington | Dallas, TX |
| G | 32 | Andrew III Malveaux | 5 ft 10 in (1.78 m) | 170 lb (77 kg) | RS Jr | Strake Jesuit College Prep | Houston, TX |
| F | 42 | Davon Barnes | 6 ft 5 in (1.96 m) | 215 lb (98 kg) | Fr | Collierville HS | Memphis, TN |
| F | 44 | Brison Gresham | 6 ft 9 in (2.06 m) | 240 lb (109 kg) | Sr | Houston | New Orleans, LA |

Head coach

- Johnny Jones (LSU)

Assistant coach(es)

- Randy Peele
- Shyrone Chatman
- Josh White

Legend

- (C) Team captain
- (S) Suspended
- (I) Ineligible
- (W) Walk-on
- Injured
- Current redshirt

Roster
Last update: October 28, 2021

== Schedule and results ==
| Date time, TV | Rank^{#} | Opponent^{#} | Result | Record | High points | High rebounds | High assists | Site (attendance) city, state |
Exhibition
| November 4, 2021*; 7:00 p.m. | | Texas College | W 97–55 | | 12 – Nicholas | 6 – tied | 5 – Henry | H&PE Arena (2,842); Houston, TX |
Non-conference regular season
| November 9, 2021*; 4:00 p.m., P12N | | at No. 13 Oregon | L 66–83 | 0–1 | 19 – Walker | 6 – Walker | 3 – Henry | Matthew Knight Arena (7,037); Eugene, OR |
| November 12, 2021*; 7:00 p.m., WCC Network | | at Saint Mary's | L 58–67 | 0–2 | 16 – Nicholas | 7 – Nicholas | 5 – Henry | University Credit Union Pavilion (2,602); Moraga, CA |
| November 15, 2021*; 6:00 p.m., P12N | | at Washington | L 65–72 | 0–3 | 16 – Nicholas | 11 – Gresham | 3 – Henry | Alaska Airlines Arena (5,315); Seattle, WA |
| November 17, 2021*; 7:00 p.m., MW Network/FalconVision | | at Air Force | L 57–61 | 0–4 | 16 – Walker | 6 – Nicholas | 2 – tied | Clune Arena (1,331); Colorado Springs, CO |
| November 21, 2021*; 6:00 p.m., ACCRSN | | at NC State | L 57–65 | 0–5 | 12 – Henry | 13 – Rasas | 1 – tied | PNC Arena (11,806); Raleigh, NC |
| November 24, 2021*; 7:00 p.m., BYUtv | | at No. 18 BYU | L 64–81 | 0–6 | 21 – Henry | 9 – Gresham | 2 – tied | Marriott Center (15,646); Provo, UT |
| December 1, 2021*; 6:30 p.m., ESPN+ | | at Louisiana Tech | L 60–87 | 0–7 | 15 – Walker | 10 – Walker | 3 – Walker | Thomas Assembly Center (2,286); Ruston, LA |
| December 6, 2021*; 5:00 p.m., SECN+ | | at No. 20 Florida | W 69–54 | 1–7 | 16 – Henry | 13 – Gresham | 7 – Walker | O'Connell Center (7,623); Gainesville, FL |
| December 14, 2021*; 7:30 p.m., ESPN+ | | at Texas–Rio Grande Valley | W 70–60 | 2–7 | 18 – Gresham | 12 – Gresham | 4 – Hopkins | Bert Ogden Arena (1,189); Edinburg, TX |
| December 18, 2021*; 11:00 a.m., ESPN+ | | at Cincinnati | Canceled due to COVID-19 issues within TSU program | | | | | Fifth Third Arena; Cincinnati, OH |
| December 29, 2021*; 3:00 p.m., ESPN+ | | at TCU | Canceled due to COVID-19 issues within TCU program | | | | | Schollmaier Arena; Fort Worth, TX |
SWAC regular season
| January 3, 2022; 7:30 p.m. | | at Southern | L 50–63 | 2–8 (0–1) | 14 – Nicholas | 12 – Nicholas | 3 – 2 tied | F. G. Clark Center (2,675); Baton Rouge, LA |
| January 5, 2022; 7:30 p.m. | | at Grambling State | W 67–61 | 3–8 (1–1) | 16 – Henry | 8 – Walker | 2 – 2 tied | Fredrick C. Hobdy Assembly Center (486); Grambling, LA |
| January 8, 2022; 7:30 p.m., AT&T SportsNet | | Arkansas–Pine Bluff | W 90–71 | 4–8 (2–1) | 21 – Etienne | 7 – Rasas | 5 – Lawson | H&PE Arena (878); Houston, TX |
| January 10, 2022; 7:30 p.m., YouTube | | Mississippi Valley State | W 95–58 | 5–8 (3–1) | 16 – Walker | 8 – Gresham | 5 – Etienne | H&PE Arena (580); Houston, TX |
| January 15, 2022; 3:00 p.m. | | at Alcorn State | L 72–73 | 5–9 (3–2) | 22 – Etienne | 12 – Nicholas | 2 – 2 tied | Davey Whitney Complex (312); Lorman, MS |
| January 17, 2022; 7:30 p.m. | | at Jackson State | L 58–61 | 5–10 (3–3) | 13 – Walker | 5 – Gresham | 2 – 2 tied | Williams Assembly Center (500); Jackson, MS |
| January 22, 2022; 7:30 p.m., AT&T SportsNet | | Alabama A&M | W 78–44 | 6–10 (4–3) | 15 – Jones | 8 – Lawson | 5 – Gilliam | H&PE Arena (1,042); Houston, TX |
| January 24, 2022; 7:30 p.m. | | Alabama State | W 73–66 | 7–10 (5–3) | 11 – 2 tied | 16 – Gresham | 6 – Gilliam | H&PE Arena (2,163); Houston, TX |
| January 29, 2022; 5:30 p.m., ESPNU | | at Prairie View A&M | W 75–74 ^{OT} | 8–10 (6–3) | 20 – Etienne | 11 – Rasas | 3 – Walker | William J. Nicks Building (3,047); Prairie View, TX |
| February 5, 2022; 3:30 p.m., NBA TV | | at Florida A&M | W 67–55 | 9–10 (7–3) | 18 – Etienne | 7 – Rasas | 4 – Gilliam | Al Lawson Center (3,087); Tallahassee, FL |
| February 7, 2022; 7:30 p.m. | | at Bethune–Cookman | W 66–63 | 10–10 (8–3) | 15 – Nicholas | 11 – Nicholas | 3 – Nicholas | Moore Gymnasium (411); Daytona Beach, FL |
| February 12, 2022; 3:30 p.m., NBA TV | | Grambling State | W 68–65 | 11–10 (9–3) | 15 – Jones | 8 – Gresham | 3 – Gilliam | H&PE Arena (6,034); Houston, TX |
| February 14, 2022; 7:30 p.m. | | Southern | L 58–70 | 11–11 (9–4) | 14 – Nicholas | 7 – Gilliam | 4 – Etienne | H&PE Arena (3,187); Houston, TX |
| February 19, 2022; 4:00 p.m. | | at Mississippi Valley State | W 79–59 | 12–11 (10–4) | 14 – Hopkins | 10 – Rasas | 3 – Jones | Harrison HPER Complex (2,232); Itta Bena, MS |
| February 21, 2022; 7:30 p.m. | | at Arkansas–Pine Bluff | W 70–68 | 13–11 (11–4) | 13 – Gresham | 7 – Henry | 3 – 2 tied | K. L. Johnson Complex (2,312); Pine Bluff, AR |
| February 26, 2022; 7:30 p.m. | | Jackson State | W 81–66 | 14–11 (12–4) | 14 – Henry | 10 – Nicholas | 3 – Gilliam | H&PE Arena (2,456); Houston, TX |
| February 28, 2022; 7:30 p.m. | | Alcorn State | L 72–75 | 14–12 (12–5) | 15 – Etienne | 10 – Gresham | 5 – Gilliam | H&PE Arerna (1,971); Houston, TX |
| March 5, 2022; 7:30 p.m. | | Prairie View A&M | W 78–77 | 15–12 (13–5) | 16 – Lawson | 10 – Gresham | 3 – Gilliam | H&PE Arena (7,284); Houston, TX |
SWAC tournament
| March 9, 2022; 2:00 p.m., ESPN+ | (2) | vs. (7) Jackson State; Quarterfinal | W 54–50 | 16–12 | 14 – Walker | 7 – Gresham | 2 – Etienne | Bartow Arena (266); Birmingham, AL |
| March 11, 2022; 2:00 p.m., ESPN+ | (2) | vs. (6) Grambling State; Semifinal | W 73–54 | 17–12 | 18 – Henry | 7 – Henry | 4 – Nicholas | Bartow Arena (444); Birmingham, AL |
| March 12, 2022; 5:00 p.m., ESPNU | (2) | vs. (1) Alcorn State; Championship | W 87–62 | 18–12 | 17 – Walker | 8 – Nicholas | 4 – Lawson | Bartow Arena (776); Birmingham, AL |
NCAA tournament
| March 15, 2022*; 5:40 p.m., TruTV | (16 MW) | vs. (16 MW) Texas A&M–Corpus Christi; First Four | W 76–67 | 19–12 | 21 – Etienne | 14 – Gresham | 2 – Henry | UD Arena (12,522); Dayton, OH |
| March 17, 2022*; 9:43 p.m., TruTV | (16 MW) | vs. (1 MW) No. 3 Kansas; First round | L 56–83 | 19–13 | 13 – Walker III | 9 – Nicholas | 4 – Gilliam | Dickies Arena (10,560); Fort Worth, TX |
*Non-conference game. ^{#}Rankings from AP poll. (#) Tournament seedings in parentheses. All times are in Central.
