= 2021–22 Arkansas–Pine Bluff Golden Lions men's basketball team =

American college basketball season

2021–22 Arkansas–Pine Bluff Golden Lions men's basketball
- Conference: Southwestern Athletic Conference
- Record: 7–24 (5–13 SWAC)
- Head coach: Solomon Bozeman (1st season)
- Assistant coaches: Cameron Henderson; Bryan Sherrer; Dakota Brasher
- Home arena: H. O. Clemmons Arena

2021–22 SWAC men's basketball standings
	Conf.				Overall
Team	W		L	PCT	W		L	PCT
Alcorn State	14	–	4	.778	17	–	17	.500
Texas Southern †	13	–	5	.722	19	–	13	.594
Southern	12	–	6	.667	17	–	14	.548
Florida A&M	11	–	7	.611	13	–	17	.433
Alabama A&M	10	–	8	.556	12	–	18	.400
Grambling State	9	–	9	.500	12	–	20	.375
Jackson State	9	–	9	.500	11	–	19	.367
Prairie View A&M	8	–	10	.444	8	–	19	.296
Alabama State	8	–	10	.444	9	–	21	.300
Bethune–Cookman	7	–	11	.389	9	–	21	.300
Arkansas–Pine Bluff	5	–	13	.278	7	–	24	.226
Mississippi Valley State	2	–	16	.111	2	–	26	.071
† 2022 SWAC tournament winner

The 2021–22 Arkansas–Pine Bluff Golden Lions men's basketball team represented the University of Arkansas at Pine Bluff in the 2021–22 NCAA Division I men's basketball season. The Golden Lions, led by first-year head coach Solomon Bozeman, played their home games at the H. O. Clemmons Arena in Pine Bluff, Arkansas as members of the Southwestern Athletic Conference.

== Previous season ==
In a season limited due to the ongoing COVID-19 pandemic, the Golden Lions finished the 2020–21 season 4–21, 3–12 in SWAC play to finish in ninth place. In the SWAC tournament, they lost in the quarterfinals to Fairfield.

On April 17, 2021, head coach George Ivory announced his resignation, leaving the program after 13 years at the helm. On June 11, the school named Oral Roberts assistant Solomon Bozeman as Ivory's replacement.

== Roster ==
2021–22 Arkansas–Pine Bluff Golden Lions men's basketball team
Players
Coaches

Pos.	#	Name	Height	Weight	Year	Hometown
G	0	Kshun Stokes	6 ft 2 in (1.88 m)	190 lb (86 kg)	Jr	Headland, Alabama
G	1	Kylen Milton	6 ft 4 in (1.93 m)	192 lb (87 kg)	So	Conway, Arkansas
G	2	Travonta Doolittle	6 ft 4 in (1.93 m)	179 lb (81 kg)	Sr	Hughes, Arkansas
G	3	Jaylan Thomas	6 ft 8 in (2.03 m)	183 lb (83 kg)	So	Tulsa, Oklahoma
G	4	Gabriel Vargas	6 ft 5 in (1.96 m)	180 lb (82 kg)	Fr	Miami, Florida
G	5	Dequan Morris	6 ft 4 in (1.93 m)	182 lb (83 kg)	Sr	Pine Bluff, Arkansas
G	10	Isaiah Haralson	6 ft 2 in (1.88 m)	178 lb (81 kg)	Jr	Pearland, Texas
G	11	Brandon Brown	6 ft 5 in (1.96 m)	210 lb (95 kg)	Jr	Memphis, Tennessee
G	14	Brahm Harris	6 ft 6 in (1.98 m)	215 lb (98 kg)	Jr	Maumelle, Arkansas
F	15	AJ Stredic	6 ft 8 in (2.03 m)	215 lb (98 kg)	Jr	Bay City, Texas
F	22	Omar Parchman	6 ft 8 in (2.03 m)	210 lb (95 kg)	Sr	Wynne, Arkansas
F	23	Trey Sampson	6 ft 9 in (2.06 m)	210 lb (95 kg)	Jr	Davenport, Iowa
F	30	Dreshaun Doyne	6 ft 8 in (2.03 m)	192 lb (87 kg)	Fr	Little Rock, Arkansas
F	34	Amadou Fall	6 ft 10 in (2.08 m)	225 lb (102 kg)	Jr	Kaolack, Senegal
G	55	Shawn Williams	6 ft 1 in (1.85 m)	180 lb (82 kg)	Sr	Little Rock, Arkansas

Head coach

- Solomon Bozeman (Little Rock)

Assistant coach(es)

- Cameron Henderson (Montana State)
- Bryan Sherrer (South Alabama)
- Dakota Brasher (Indiana)

Legend

- (C) Team captain
- (S) Suspended
- (I) Ineligible
- (W) Walk-on
- Injured
- Current redshirt

Roster
Last update: December 10, 2021

== Schedule and results ==
Date time, TV	Rank^{#}	Opponent^{#}	Result	Record	High points	High rebounds	High assists	Site (attendance) city, state
Non-conference regular season
November 9, 2021*; 7:00 pm, FS1		at Creighton	L 77–90	0–1	29 – Sampson	14 – Brown	3 – 2 Tied	CHI Health Center Omaha (15,072); Omaha, NE
November 12, 2021*; 9:00 pm, KCDO		at Colorado State	L 71–91	0–2	26 – Williams	6 – Brown	3 – 2 Tied	Moby Arena (4,776); Fort Collins, CO
November 14, 2021*; 3:00 pm, MW Network		at Wyoming	L 45–85	0–3	17 – Milton	6 – Sampson	3 – Williams	Arena-Auditorium (3,023); Laramie, WY
November 18, 2021*; 10:00 pm, KRCW		at Portland	L 74–86	0–4	31 – Williams	11 – Brown	5 – Williams	Chiles Center (1,018); Portland, OR
November 22, 2021*; 9:00 pm, ESPN+		at Seattle	L 56–77	0–5	17 – Brown	17 – Brown	2 – Milton	Climate Pledge Arena (1,082); Seattle, WA
November 24, 2021*; 9:00 pm, ESPN+		at UC Santa Barbara	L 58–86	0–6	17 – Milton	5 – Milton	5 – Williams	The Thunderdome (702); Santa Barbara, CA
November 26, 2021*; 9:00 pm, WCC Network		at Pacific	L 50–74	0–7	14 – Williams	4 – 3 Tied	3 – Williams	Alex G. Spanos Center (1,016); Stockton, CA
November 29, 2021*; 7:30 pm, UAPB Sports Network		Arkansas Baptist	W 75–70	1–7	21 – Sampson	12 – Brown	6 – Williams	H. O. Clemmons Arena (1,483); Pine Bluff, AR
December 1, 2021*; 7:00 pm, Big 12 Now		at No. 19 Iowa State	L 64–83	1–8	21 – Williams	6 – Sampson	5 – Williams	Hilton Coliseum (12,305); Ames, IA
December 4, 2021*; 4:00 pm, Big 12 Now		at No. 4 Baylor	L 54–99	1–9	19 – Brown	6 – Brown	5 – Williams	Ferrell Center (6,207); Waco, TX
December 8, 2021*; 7:00 pm, UAPB Sports Network		Arkansas State	L 73–84	1–10	21 – Brown	11 – Brown	7 – Williams	H. O. Clemmons Arena (3,148); Pine Bluff, AR
December 14, 2021*; 8:00 pm, ESPNU		at No. 17 Texas	L 31–63	1–11	8 – Milton	6 – Milton	3 – Milton	Frank Erwin Center (10,513); Austin, TX
December 18, 2021*; 2:00 pm, UAPB Sports Network		Ecclesia	W 97-56	2–11	23 – Morris	8 – Brown	6 – Vargas	H. O. Clemmons Arena (648); Pine Bluff, AR
SWAC regular season
January 3, 2022; 5:30 pm, UAPB Sports Network		Alabama A&M	L 50–70	2–12 (0–1)	15 – Doolittle	5 – Milton	4 – Williams	H. O. Clemmons Arena (842); Pine Bluff, AR
January 5, 2022; 5:30 pm, UAPB Sports Network		Alabama State	W 70–68	3–12 (1–1)	22 – Williams	7 – 2 Tied	4 – Williams	H. O. Clemmons Arena (564); Pine Bluff, AR
January 8, 2022; 7:30 pm, UAPB Sports Network		at Texas Southern	L 71–90	3–13 (1–2)	30 – Williams	6 – Stredic	3 – Sampson	H&PE Arena (878); Houston, TX
January 10, 2022; 7:30 pm, UAPB Sports Network		at Prairie View A&M	L 58–75	3–14 (1–3)	33 – Morris	5 – Morris	4 – Williams	William Nicks Building (257); Prairie View, TX
January 15, 2022; 5:30 pm, UAPB Sports Network		Florida A&M	L 66–71 ^{OT}	3–15 (1–4)	17 – Brown	8 – Brown	3 – 3 Tied	H. O. Clemmons Arena (1,254); Pine Bluff, AR
January 17, 2022; 7:30 pm, UAPB Sports Network		Bethune–Cookman	W 69–63	4–15 (2–4)	20 – Morris	7 – Sampson	6 – Brown	H. O. Clemmons Arena (941); Pine Bluff, AR
January 22, 2022; 5:00 pm, UAPB Sports Network		at Southern	L 51–99	4–16 (2–5)	21 – Morris	7 – Brown	2 – 4 Tied	F. G. Clark Center (3,274); Baton Rouge, LA
January 24, 2022; 7:30 pm, UAPB Sports Network		at Grambling State	L 65–76	4–17 (2–6)	22 – Morris	8 – Brown	6 – Williams	Fredrick C. Hobdy Assembly Center (2,137); Grambling, LA
January 29, 2022; 4:30 pm, UAPB Sports Network		at Mississippi Valley State	W 74–68	5–17 (3–6)	26 – Williams	7 – Stokes	5 – Stokes	Harrison HPER Complex (1,985); Itta Bena, MS
February 5, 2022; 5:30 pm, UAPB Sports Network		Alcorn State	L 64–70	5–18 (3–7)	20 – Morris	6 – 2 Tied	5 – Brown	H. O. Clemmons Arena (2,149); Pine Bluff, AR
February 7, 2022; 7:30 pm, UAPB Sports Network		Jackson State	L 47–60	5–19 (3–8)	16 – Morris	4 – 2 Tied	8 – Williams	H. O. Clemmons Arena (1,861); Pine Bluff, AR
February 12, 2022; 4:30 pm, UAPB Sports Network		at Alabama State	W 75–70	6–19 (4–8)	17 – Milton	11 – Brown	3 – Vargas	Dunn–Oliver Acadome (980); Montgomery, AL
February 14, 2022; 7:30 pm, UAPB Sports Network		at Alabama A&M	L 69–74	6–20 (4–9)	28 – Williams	8 – Morris	4 – Morris	Elmore Gymnasium (788); Normal, AL
February 19, 2022; 5:30 pm, UAPB Sports Network		Prairie View A&M	L 84–92	6–21 (4–10)	26 – Williams	10 – Brown	5 – Brown	H. O. Clemmons Arena (1,628); Pine Bluff, AR
February 21, 2022; 7:30 pm, UAPB Sports Network		Texas Southern	L 68–70	6–22 (4–11)	29 – Williams	8 – Stokes	3 – Stokes	H. O. Clemmons Arena (2,312); Pine Bluff, AR
February 26, 2022; 5:30 pm, UAPB Sports Network		Mississippi Valley State	W 93–79	7–22 (5–11)	34 – Williams	13 – Brown	5 – Milton	H. O. Clemmons Arena (2,445); Pine Bluff, AR
March 3, 2022; 7:30 pm, UAPB Sports Network		at Jackson State	L 79–87	7–23 (5–12)	32 – Williams	8 – Morris	4 – Stredic	Williams Assembly Center (2,190); Jackson, MS
March 5, 2022; 7:30 pm, UAPB Sports Network		at Alcorn State	L 77–100	7–24 (5–13)	42 – Milton	4 – Tied	2 – Tied	Davey Whitney Complex (385); Lorman, MS
*Non-conference game. ^{#}Rankings from AP Poll. (#) Tournament seedings in parentheses. All times are in Central.
