= 2021–22 Bethune–Cookman Wildcats men's basketball team =

American college basketball season

2021–22 Bethune–Cookman Wildcats men's basketball
- Conference: Southwestern Athletic Conference
- East Division
- Record: 9–21 (7–11 SWAC)
- Head coach: Reggie Theus (1st season)
- Associate head coach: Chris Pompey
- Assistant coaches: Ross Rix; Billy Garrett
- Home arena: Moore Gymnasium

2021–22 SWAC men's basketball standings
| | Conf. | | | | Overall |
| Team | W | | L | PCT | W | | L | PCT |
|---|---|---|---|---|---|---|---|---|
| Alcorn State | 14 | – | 4 | .778 | 17 | – | 17 | .500 |
| Texas Southern † | 13 | – | 5 | .722 | 19 | – | 13 | .594 |
| Southern | 12 | – | 6 | .667 | 17 | – | 14 | .548 |
| Florida A&M | 11 | – | 7 | .611 | 13 | – | 17 | .433 |
| Alabama A&M | 10 | – | 8 | .556 | 12 | – | 18 | .400 |
| Grambling State | 9 | – | 9 | .500 | 12 | – | 20 | .375 |
| Jackson State | 9 | – | 9 | .500 | 11 | – | 19 | .367 |
| Prairie View A&M | 8 | – | 10 | .444 | 8 | – | 19 | .296 |
| Alabama State | 8 | – | 10 | .444 | 9 | – | 21 | .300 |
| Bethune–Cookman | 7 | – | 11 | .389 | 9 | – | 21 | .300 |
| Arkansas–Pine Bluff | 5 | – | 13 | .278 | 7 | – | 24 | .226 |
| Mississippi Valley State | 2 | – | 16 | .111 | 2 | – | 26 | .071 |
† 2022 SWAC tournament winner

The 2021–22 Bethune–Cookman Wildcats men's basketball team represented Bethune–Cookman University in the 2021–22 NCAA Division I men's basketball season. The Wildcats, led by first-year head coach Reggie Theus, played their home games at Moore Gymnasium in Daytona Beach, Florida as members of the Southwestern Athletic Conference (SWAC).

On July 1, 2021, the Wildcats officially joined the SWAC after being a member of the Mid-Eastern Athletic Conference since 1979.

== Previous season ==
The Wildcats did not participate in the 2020–21 NCAA Division I men's basketball season due to the ongoing COVID-19 pandemic.

Head coach Ryan Ridder left the Wildcats to become the head coach at UT−Martin on March 30, 2021. Theus was named head coach and athletic director at Bethune−Cookman in July 2021.

== Roster ==
2021–22 Bethune–Cookman Wildcats men's basketball team
Players
Coaches

| Pos. | # | Name | Height | Weight | Year | Hometown |
|---|---|---|---|---|---|---|
| G | 0 | Mikey West | 6 ft 0 in (1.83 m) | 170 lb (77 kg) | Fr | Waterbury, CT |
| G | 1 | Collins Joseph | 6 ft 9 in (2.06 m) | 160 lb (73 kg) | | Clayton County, GA |
| G/F | 2 | Jakolby Long | 6 ft 4 in (1.93 m) | 215 lb (98 kg) | GS | Oklahoma City, OK |
| G | 3 | Marcus Garrett | 6 ft 1 in (1.85 m) | 195 lb (88 kg) | | Chicago, IL |
| G | 4 | Kendall Bean | 6 ft 1 in (1.85 m) | 195 lb (88 kg) | | Port Orange, FL |
| G | 5 | Damani McEntire | 6 ft 4 in (1.93 m) | 190 lb (86 kg) | Jr | Indianapolis, IN |
| G | 10 | Shakur Poteat | 6 ft 1 in (1.85 m) | 175 lb (79 kg) | Fr | Orlando, FL |
| G | 11 | Aaron Jasper | 6 ft 2 in (1.88 m) | 185 lb (84 kg) | Fr | Clinton, MD |
| G/F | 12 | Kevin Davis | 6 ft 5 in (1.96 m) | 180 lb (82 kg) | Sr | Portsmouth, VA |
| F | 13 | Calvin Poulina | 6 ft 7 in (2.01 m) | 250 lb (113 kg) | Jr | Leiden, Netherlands |
| G | 15 | Matthew Mondesir | 6 ft 5 in (1.96 m) | 210 lb (95 kg) | Jr | Los Angeles, CA |
| F | 21 | Jonathan Bolden | 6 ft 6 in (1.98 m) | 215 lb (98 kg) | Sr | Harvest, AL |
| C | 22 | Dylan Robertson | 6 ft 9 in (2.06 m) | 205 lb (93 kg) | Sr | Tuscaloosa, AL |
| G | 23 | Quavon Blackwood | 6 ft 0 in (1.83 m) | 198 lb (90 kg) | Sr | Hyattsville, MD |
| G | 30 | Joe French | 6 ft 5 in (1.96 m) | 180 lb (82 kg) | So | Orlando, FL |
| G | 32 | Jon Brown | 6 ft 6 in (1.98 m) | 195 lb (88 kg) | GS | Miami, FL |

Head coach

- Reggie Theus (UNLV)

Assistant coach(es)

- Chris Pompey (Pittsburgh)
- Ross Rix (Louisiana)
- Billy Garrett (DePaul)

Legend

- (C) Team captain
- (S) Suspended
- (I) Ineligible
- (W) Walk-on
- Injured
- Current redshirt

Roster
Last update: January 4, 2022

== Schedule and results ==
| Date time, TV | Rank^{#} | Opponent^{#} | Result | Record | High points | High rebounds | High assists | Site (attendance) city, state |
Regular season
| November 9, 2021*; 5:00 p.m., ESPN+ | | at South Florida | L 54–75 | 0–1 | 14 – French | 11 – Davis | 6 – Joseph | Yuengling Center; Tampa, FL |
| November 12, 2021*; 7:00 p.m. | | at Middle Tennessee | L 51–71 | 0–2 | 18 – French | 7 – Robertson | 5 – West | Murphy Center (2,317); Murfreesboro, TN |
| November 15, 2021*; 10:00 p.m., P12N | | at Utah; Sunshine Slam campus game | L 55–86 | 0–3 | 20 – McEntire | 6 – Robertson | 4 – McEntire | Jon M. Huntsman Center (6,638); Salt Lake City, UT |
| November 20, 2021*; 12:00 p.m., FloSports | | vs. Bryant; Sunshine Slam Bracket B semifinals | W 81–75 | 1–3 | 21 – Robertson | 9 – McEntire | 5 – Long | Ocean Center; Daytona Beach, FL |
| November 21, 2021*; 2:30 p.m., FloSports | | vs. Air Force; Sunshine Slam championship | L 65–73 | 1–4 | 13 – 2 tied | 5 – 2 tied | 4 – Long | Ocean Center; Daytona Beach, FL |
| November 23, 2021*; 5:00 p.m. | | vs. Liberty | L 51–59 | 1–5 | 25 – French | 7 – 2 tied | 1 – 2 tied | Ocean Center; Daytona Beach, FL |
| November 28, 2021*; 12:00 p.m., FS1 | | at No. 21 Seton Hall | L 70–84 | 1–6 | 30 – French | 4 – 2 tied | 6 – West | Prudential Center (8,913); Newark, NJ |
| December 5, 2021*; 2:00 p.m., ESPN+ | | at UCF | L 45–81 | 1–7 | 12 – French | 4 – 3 tied | 2 – 2 tied | Addition Financial Arena (3,804); Orlando, FL |
| December 9, 2021*; 6:30 p.m., ACCRSN | | at NC State | L 48–65 | 1–8 | 14 – French | 6 – Garrett | 2 – 2 tied | Reynolds Coliseum (5,429); Raleigh, NC |
| December 15, 2021*; 7:05 p.m. | | Johnson | W 88–41 | 2–8 | 14 – Joseph | 7 – 2 tied | 7 – West | Moore Gymnasium (125); Daytona Beach, FL |
| December 22, 2021*; 10:00 p.m., ESPN3 | | at Marist | L 45–68 | 2–9 | 9 – Garrett | 8 – 2 tied | 2 – West | McCann Arena (793); Poughkeepsie, NY |
| December 29, 2021*; 5:00 p.m. | | Fort Lauderdale | Canceled due to COVID-19 protocols | | | | | Moore Gymnasium; Daytona, FL |
| January 3, 2022; 7:30 p.m. | | Florida A&M | W 66–59 | 3–9 (1–0) | 26 – Davis | 13 – Davis | 3 – 2 tied | Moore Gymnasium (176); Daytona, FL |
| January 5, 2022*; 12:00 p.m. | | at FIU | L 65–68 | 3–10 | 16 – 2 tied | 8 – Davis | 5 – McEntire | Ocean Bank Convocation Center (107); Miami, FL |
| January 8, 2022; 4:00 p.m. | | Grambling State | L 66–68 | 3–11 (1–1) | 31 – French | 15 – Davis | 8 – Garrett | Moore Gymnasium (243); Daytona, FL |
| January 10, 2022; 7:30 p.m. | | Southern | L 59–69 | 3–12 (1–2) | 16 – Garrett | 8 – McEntire | 2 – Davis | Moore Gymnasium (318); Daytona, FL |
| January 15, 2022; 5:00 p.m. | | at Mississippi Valley State | W 62–60 | 4–12 (2–2) | 19 – Davis | 9 – 2 tied | 4 – McEntire | Harrison HPER Complex (314); Itta Bena, MS |
| January 17, 2022; 8:30 p.m. | | at Arkansas–Pine Bluff | L 63–69 | 4–13 (2–3) | 16 – 2 tied | 13 – Davis | 4 – 2 tied | K. L. Johnson Complex (941); Pine Bluff, AR |
| January 22, 2022; 4:00 p.m. | | Jackson State | W 55–50 | 5–13 (3–3) | 18 – Davis | 6 – Long | 7 – Garrett | Moore Gymnasium (351); Daytona, FL |
| January 24, 2022; 7:30 p.m. | | Alcorn State | L 67–70 | 5–14 (3–4) | 21 – Garrett | 7 – Robertson | 3 – McEntire | Moore Gymnasium (366); Daytona, FL |
| January 29, 2022; 8:00 p.m. | | vs. Alabama State; Bridge Builder Classic | L 73–79 | 5–15 (3–5) | 27 – French | 7 – Robertson | 6 – Garrett | Mitchell Center (1,310); Mobile, AL |
| January 31, 2022; 6:00 p.m. | | at Alabama A&M | L 52–67 | 5–16 (3–6) | 16 – Davis | 8 – Bolden | 3 – 2 tied | Elmore Gymnasium (1,130); Normal, AL |
| February 5, 2022; 4:00 p.m. | | Prairie View A&M | W 68–67 | 6–16 (4–6) | 25 – French | 7 – Long | 5 – Garrett | Moore Gymnasium (378); Daytona, FL |
| February 7, 2022; 7:30 p.m. | | Texas Southern | L 63–66 | 6–17 (4–7) | 23 – Davis | 11 – Davis | 4 – Long | Moore Gymnasium (411); Daytona, FL |
| February 12, 2022; 4:00 p.m. | | at Alcorn State | W 71–63 ^{OT} | 7–17 (5–7) | 24 – Garrett | 9 – Davis | 5 – Garrett | Davey Whitney Complex (0); Lorman, MS |
| February 14, 2022; 8:30 p.m. | | at Jackson State | L 51–71 | 7–18 (5–8) | 16 – French | 6 – Davis | 3 – McEntire | Williams Assembly Center (1,318); Jackson, MS |
| February 19, 2022; 4:00 p.m. | | Alabama A&M | L 60–62 | 7–19 (5–9) | 21 – Garrett | 8 – Garrett | 2 – tied | Moore Gymnasium (671); Daytona, FL |
| February 21, 2022; 8:00 p.m., ESPNU | | Alabama State | L 78–89 | 7–20 (5–10) | 25 – French | 9 – Davis | 9 – Garrett | Moore Gymnasium (1,000); Daytona, FL |
| February 26, 2022; 6:00 p.m. | | at Southern | W 87–84 ^{OT} | 8–20 (6–10) | 24 – Davis | 7 – Garrett | 5 – McEntire | F. G. Clark Center (2,139); Baton Rouge, LA |
| February 28, 2022; 8:30 p.m. | | at Grambling State | W 69–63 | 9–20 (7–10) | 27 – Garrett | 9 – Davis | 3 – Garrett | Fredrick C. Hobdy Assembly Center (1,219); Grambling, LA |
| March 5, 2022; 4:00 p.m. | | at Florida A&M | L 73–84 | 9–21 (7–11) | 19 – Garrett | 6 – Garrett | 4 – Garrett | Al Lawson Center (4,687); Tallahassee, FL |
*Non-conference game. ^{#}Rankings from AP poll. (#) Tournament seedings in parentheses. All times are in Eastern.
