= Eshaunte Jones =

American college basketball player

Personal information
- Born: California, U.S.
- Listed height: 6 ft 4 in (1.93 m)
- Listed weight: 200 lb (91 kg)

Career information
- High school: North Side (Fort Wayne, Indiana)
- College: Nebraska (2008–2011); Northern Kentucky (2012–2013)
- NBA draft: 2013: undrafted
- Position: Point guard / shooting guard
- Number: 40

Eshaunte "Bear" Jones (born in 1989), is an American former basketball player. In June 2007, he announced his intention to pass on an oral commitment to play college basketball at Indiana University. In October 2007, he announced his decision to attend Oregon State University the following season after playing as a 5th year senior at Hargrave Military Academy in Virginia. He would later de-commit from Oregon State after a coaching change. In June 2008, Jones signed financial-agreement paperwork with the University of Nebraska, Lincoln. Because it was after the NCAA signing period, Coach Doc Sadler could not confirm at that time that he had accepted a scholarship. Once he cleared the NCAA clearinghouse process, he enrolled at the University of Nebraska-Lincoln for the 2008 fall term. On March 31, 2011, Jones announced that he was leaving Nebraska to take care of personal things back in Indiana with his family. After leaving Nebraska, Jones popped up at Division II Northern Kentucky.

== High school career ==
Jones attended North Side High School in Fort Wayne, Indiana, where he was ranked as one of the top players in the state from the class of 2007. As a sophomore, he led the North Side Redskins to the Class 4A Sectional 6 title with a victory over Snider High School. The following year, nearly the entire team returned as Jones led them to their first Summit Athletic Conference Title in seven years, culminating with a win over Bishop Luers High School in By Hey Arena. After the season, he was named an Indiana Junior All-Star.

As a senior, Jones orally committed to play for coach Kelvin Sampson at Indiana University and then later in the day went on to score 37 points in his team's season opening scrimmage that night. He broke the school record for point in a single game twice in the first four games with 41 against Muncie Southside and 43 against Paul Harding High School in an overtime win. In December, he, alongside former Indiana University wide receiver Damarlo Belcher and former University of Arkansas at Pine Bluff forward Dominic Moore, led the Redskins to their first SAC Holiday Tournament Title since 1985 after losing in the finals the previous year. When the season ended, he averaged just under 28 points per game, finishing third in the state behind now former Indiana Hoosier and current New Orleans Hornet Eric Gordon and high-profile college recruit Deshaun Thomas, now of Ohio State.

Jones was named an Indiana Senior All-Star (the fifth in school history) before eventually de-committing from Indiana and choosing to spend a year of prep school at Hargrave Military Academy.

== Hargrave Military Academy (2007–2008) ==
Jones attended Hargrave Military Academy (Va.) for one season following high school. He played only a partial season because of a foot injury, but quickly made a name for himself. Jones averaged about 16 points and five rebounds per contest over the first 12 games of the 2007–08 season. His efforts helped Hargrave to a 12–0 start before the team continued on to an undefeated season with a 29–0 record, including winning the National Prep Invitational title. During the season, he signed a NLI with Oregon State.

== Oregon State ==
In 2008, it was uncertain if Jones would end up at Oregon State as they signed a new coach for the 2008–2009 season and sources said that he had asked out of his national letter of intent upon request. He was later granted the release from Oregon State and within a short time agreed to sign with Nebraska.

== Nebraska ==
=== True Freshman (2008–2009) ===
Jones sat out his true freshman season in 2008–2009 as a medical redshirt. He scored 16 points in 16 minutes in a preseason exhibition before the decision to sit out the season to fix a previous foot injury from his one season at prep school. Before the redshirt, he played just 46 minutes over the first four games of the season, including only four painful minutes against Saint Louis in his final game of the year. He scored seven points and hit just 2-of-7 from the floor, including 2-of-5 shots from 3-point range, over those four contests. Jones added five rebounds but had just one assist to four turnovers before deciding to sit out the remainder of the season.

=== Redshirt Freshman (2009–2010) ===
Jones returned from a redshirt season when he had his left foot and a sports hernia surgically repaired and played in 29 games, averaging 16.9 minutes per contest in his first extended college action. Jones averaged 6.0 points and 1.6 rebounds per game while adding 1.0 assist per contest.

On the season, Jones hit 42.7 percent from the field, but it was his accuracy from beyond the arc that made opposing coaches take notice. Jones drained 43.5 percent from 3-point range while helping Nebraska set the school record by hitting 39.7 percent from long range as a team. Jones' proficiency shooting outside the arc helped him rank sixth on the Huskers' single-season 3-point percentage chart. His average was also the second-highest ever by a Husker freshman. On the year, he hit 40 3-pointers to rank second on the team while his total was the fifth-highest mark in the Nebraska freshman record book.

Jones' top performance came in the championship of the Las Vegas Classic when he scored 21 points, one of six double-figure scoring games on the season. He hit 6-of-11 shots from the field, including 5-of-7 from 3-point range, while adding three rebounds, two assists and a steal in 27 minutes off the bench. His 21 points made him one of just 23 freshmen in Nebraska history to record at least 20 points in a contest. In opening game of the tournament, Jones had 12 points on 4-of-5 shooting, all from 3-point range, in a victory over Tulsa, helping Jones earn all-tournament team honors.

On the year, Jones cracked the starting lineup twice, against UMKC and Kansas. Jones hit four three-pointers against the Jayhawks. Other games of note for Jones include a November 18 loss to Saint Louis where he had 9 points against former high school teammate Justin Jordan, who played for the Billikens, and also a December 12 game where he scored 4 points against Oregon State, a previous school of commitment. Jones missed the January 16 game against Iowa State, two days after the death of high school teammate Jeron Lewis, a basketball player at University of Southern Indiana, who collapsed on the court and later died on January 14. His next game, against Missouri, he was scoreless in just 8 minutes of play.

=== Bahamas Trip ===
Jones helped Nebraska go 4–0 on the Huskers' foreign trip in the 2010 preseason, averaging 7.0 points, 2.5 rebounds and 2.0 assists per game.

=== Sophomore (2010–2011) ===
Jones saw a significant drop off in his contributions as a sophomore, averaging just 4 points/game (10th on the team). His total three-pointers made (27-of-80) was still ranked third on the team, but his decrease in production also saw his minutes go down to just 12.4 per game over the 28 games he played. Jones did not start a single game, while averaging 1.4 rebounds and shooting just 33% from the field. Eshaunte led the team in scoring on two separate occasions, with 13 points against Jackson State on December 1 and 11 points against North Dakota on January 3. Both games were wins for the 19–13 Huskers. Nebraska's NCAA Tournament hopes were seemingly strong until a March 5 loss to Colorado, who also was left out from an at-large bid to the NCAA Tournament. Nebraska played in the NIT Tournament, but fell to Wichita State in the first round, 76–49, with Jones scoring just three points in 6 minutes of play. Shortly into the offseason, Husker coach Doc Sadler was not quiet about his team's need to shoot the ball better, something that Jones was expected to lead the way in during his sophomore campaign.

== Northern Kentucky ==
=== Junior (2011–2012) ===
After leaving Nebraska, Jones debuted for Division II Northern Kentucky on November 18, 2011, with 10 points in 19 minutes against Lane (Tennessee). On December 6, against Ohio Midwestern, he posted a team high 25 points after hitting 7 three-point shots. Northern Kentucky was ultimately eliminated in the first round of the NCAA Division II Tournament by Findlay, 50–49. Jones scored just 5 points in 33 minutes, missing a shot just after the final buzzer.

No. 11 ranked NKU finished 23–7 in its last season as a Division II member. The Norse, at the end of the 2012 season, began the reclassification process to Division I next season as a member of the Atlantic Sun Conference.

Jones played in 29 of 30 game, starting 14 and leading the team in scoring six different times. Jones finished second on the team, averaging 10.7 points per game while shooting 69-for-156 from three-point range. In 22.6 minute per game, he shot 45% from the field during the season.

On February 28, 2013, Jones scored his 1000th career point at home against North Florida.

== Awards ==
=== High school ===
- 2007 North Side Most Valuable Player
- 2007 Fort Wayne News Sentinel Player of the Year
- 2007 Fort Wayne Journal Gazette Player of the Year
- 2007 McDonald's All-American Nominee
- 2007 Basketball FortWayne Co-Player of the Year
- 2007 Indiana News Center Player of the Year
- 2007 Indiana All-Star
- 2007 Summit Athletic Conference First Team (Unanimous Selection)
- 2006–2007 Basketball FortWayne Preseason Player of the Year
- 2006 Fort Wayne News Sentinel All-Area Team
- 2006 Fort Wayne Journal Gazette All-Area Team
- 2006 North Side Most Valuable Player
- 2006 Summit Athletic Conference First Team
- 2006 Indiana Junior All-Star
- 2005 Summit Athletic Conference First Team
- 2004 Summit Athletic Conference Second Team
