= 2021–22 Nicholls Colonels men's basketball team =

American college basketball season

2021–22 Nicholls Colonels men's basketball

Southland regular season champions

NIT, First Round
- Conference: Southland Conference
- Record: 21–12 (11–3 Southland)
- Head coach: Austin Claunch (4th season)
- Associate head coach: Nick Bowman
- Assistant coaches: Darion Brown; Stevie Taylor
- Home arena: Stopher Gymnasium

2021–22 Southland Conference men's basketball standings
| | Conf. | | | | Overall |
| Team | W | | L | PCT | W | | L | PCT |
|---|---|---|---|---|---|---|---|---|
| Nicholls | 11 | – | 3 | .786 | 21 | – | 12 | .636 |
| Southeastern Louisiana | 10 | – | 4 | .714 | 19 | – | 15 | .559 |
| New Orleans | 10 | – | 4 | .714 | 18 | – | 14 | .563 |
| Texas A&M–Corpus Christi † | 7 | – | 7 | .500 | 23 | – | 12 | .657 |
| Houston Baptist | 6 | – | 8 | .429 | 11 | – | 18 | .379 |
| Northwestern State | 5 | – | 9 | .357 | 9 | – | 23 | .281 |
| McNeese State | 4 | – | 10 | .286 | 11 | – | 22 | .333 |
| Incarnate Word | 3 | – | 11 | .214 | 7 | – | 25 | .219 |
† 2022 Southland tournament winner

The 2021–22 Nicholls Colonels men's basketball team represented Nicholls State University in the 2021–22 NCAA Division I men's basketball season. The Colonels, led by fourth-year head coach Austin Claunch, played their home games at Stopher Gymnasium in Thibodaux, Louisiana as members of the Southland Conference. They finished the season 21–12, 11–3 in Southland Play to finish as regular season champions. They lost in the semifinals of the Southland tournament to Texas A&M Corpus-Christi. As a No. 1 seed who didn’t win their conference tournament, they received an automatic bid to the National Invitation Tournament where they lost in the first round to SMU.

== Previous season ==
The Colonels finished the 2020–21 season 18–7, 14–2 in Southland play to finish as Southland regular season champions. In the Southland tournament, they defeated Northwestern State in the semifinals, before falling to Abilene Christian in the championship game.

== Roster ==
2021–22 Nicholls Colonels men's basketball team
Players
Coaches

| Pos. | # | Name | Height | Weight | Year | Hometown |
|---|---|---|---|---|---|---|
| G | 0 | Ty Gordon | 6 ft 1 in (1.85 m) | 200 lb (91 kg) | RS Sr | Tunica, MS |
| F | 1 | Emmanuel Little | 6 ft 6 in (1.98 m) | 225 lb (102 kg) | RS Sr | Indianapolis, IN |
| G | 2 | Tyrease Terrell | 6 ft 4 in (1.93 m) | 165 lb (75 kg) | Jr | Slidell, LA |
| G | 3 | Jon'Quarius McGhee | 6 ft 2 in (1.88 m) | 195 lb (88 kg) | Fr | Opelousas, LA |
| G | 4 | Caleb Huffman | 6 ft 4 in (1.93 m) | 185 lb (84 kg) | Sr | Broken Arrow, OK |
| G | 5 | Pierce Spencer | 6 ft 3 in (1.91 m) | 175 lb (79 kg) | So | Porter, TX |
| F | 10 | Ryan Maxwell | 6 ft 7 in (2.01 m) | 250 lb (113 kg) | Fr | Jacksonville, AR |
| G | 11 | Latrell Jones | 6 ft 5 in (1.96 m) | 180 lb (82 kg) | Sr | New Orleans, LA |
| F | 12 | Taylor Blanchard | 6 ft 5 in (1.96 m) | 165 lb (75 kg) | So | Morgan City, LA |
| F | 13 | Mekhi Collins | 6 ft 8 in (2.03 m) | 225 lb (102 kg) | Fr | Baton Rouge, LA |
| G | 14 | Devante Carter | 6 ft 3 in (1.91 m) | 210 lb (95 kg) | RS Sr | Newport News, VA |
| G | 21 | Jalen White | 6 ft 4 in (1.93 m) | 180 lb (82 kg) | So | Pasadena, TX |
| F | 22 | Manny Littles | 6 ft 7 in (2.01 m) | 215 lb (98 kg) | Sr | Lanett, AL |
| F | 23 | Edoardo Del Cadia | 6 ft 8 in (2.03 m) | 240 lb (109 kg) | Sr | Senigallia, Italy |
| G | 24 | Quinn Strander | 5 ft 10 in (1.78 m) | 175 lb (79 kg) | So | Thibodaux, LA |
| C | 35 | Ryghe Lyons | 6 ft 11 in (2.11 m) | 280 lb (127 kg) | RS Sr | Slidell, LA |

Head coach

- Austin Claunch (Emory)

Assistant coach(es)

- Nick Bowman (Eastern Kentucky)
- Darion Brown (Our Lady of the Lake)
- Stevie Taylor (Ohio)

Legend

- (C) Team captain
- (S) Suspended
- (I) Ineligible
- (W) Walk-on
- Injured
- Current redshirt

Roster
Last update: November 13, 2021

== Schedule and results ==
| Date time, TV | Rank^{#} | Opponent^{#} | Result | Record | Site (attendance) city, state |
Exhibition
| October 23, 2021*; 1:00 pm | | LSU; Hurricane Ida Charity Relief | L 62–74 | – | Stopher Gymnasium; Thibodaux, LA |
Non-conference regular season
| November 9, 2021*; 7:00 pm, ESPN3 | | at Northern Iowa | W 62–58 | 1–0 | McLeod Center (2,328); Cedar Falls, IA |
| November 12, 2021*; 7:00 pm | | Carver | W 120–52 | 2–0 | Stopher Gymnasium (321); Thibodaux, LA |
| November 13, 2021*; 12:00 pm | | Carver | W 101–44 | 3–0 | Stopher Gymnasium (202); Thibodaux, LA |
| November 15, 2021*; 11:00 am, ESPN+ | | at No. 9 Baylor | L 60–89 | 3–1 | Ferrell Center (9,307); Waco, TX |
| November 18, 2021*; 7:00 pm, ESPN+ | | at TCU; SoCal Challenge campus-site game | L 50–63 | 3–2 | Schollmaier Arena (4,825); Fort Worth, TX |
| November 22, 2021*; 2:00 pm, FloHoops | | vs. Cal Poly; SoCal Challenge Sand Division semifinals | W 75–72 ^{OT} | 4–2 | The Pavilion at JSerra; San Juan Capistrano, CA |
| November 24, 2021*; 4:30 pm, FloHoops | | vs. Utah Valley; SoCal Challenge Sand Division championship | L 63–74 | 4–3 | The Pavilion at JSerra (1,700); San Juan Capistrano, CA |
| November 27, 2021*; 1:30 pm | | Southwestern Christian | W 87–58 | 5–3 | Stopher Gymnasium (504); Thibodaux, LA |
| December 9, 2021*; 7:00 pm | | at Mississippi Valley State | W 95–80 | 6–3 | Harrison HPER Complex (202); Itta Bena, MS |
| December 13, 2021*; 7:00 pm | | Blue Mountain | W 87–69 | 7–3 | Stopher Gymnasium (285); Thibodaux, LA |
| December 15, 2021*; 7:00 pm, BTN | | at Wisconsin | L 68–71 | 7–4 | Kohl Center (15,752); Madison, WI |
| December 18, 2021*; 3:00 pm | | Mississippi Valley State | W 104–73 | 8–4 | Stopher Gymnasium (287); Thibodaux, LA |
| December 21, 2021*; 10:00 pm, P12N | | at Oregon State | L 61–83 | 8–5 | Gill Coliseum (2,873); Corvallis, OR |
| December 29, 2021*; 4:00 pm, BTN | | at No. 3 Purdue | L 90–104 | 8–6 | Mackey Arena (14,804); West Lafayette, IN |
| January 6, 2022*; 7:30 pm, ESPN+ | | vs. Incarnate Word; Southland Basketball Tip-Off First Round | W 87–56 | 9–6 | Merrell Center (102); Katy, TX |
| January 7, 2022*; 7:30 pm, ESPN+ | | vs. Texas A&M–Corpus Christi; Southland Tip-Off Tournament semifinals | W 84–75 | 10–6 | Merrell Center; Katy, TX |
| January 8, 2022*; 7:30 pm, ESPN+ | | vs. Southeastern Louisiana; Southland Tip-Off tournament championship | L 72–77 | 10–7 | Merrell Center; Katy, TX |
Southland regular season
| January 15, 2022; 4:00 pm, ESPN+ | | at New Orleans | L 66–78 | 10–8 (0–1) | Lakefront Arena (1,102); New Orleans, LA |
| January 20, 2022; 7:30 pm | | Northwestern State | W 69–58 | 11–8 (1–1) | Stopher Gymnasium (325); Thibodaux, LA |
| January 22, 2022; 3:00 pm, ESPN+ | | Southeastern Louisiana | L 93–101 | 11–9 (1–2) | Stopher Gymnasium (501); Thibodaux, LA |
| January 27, 2022; 7:30 pm | | at McNeese State | W 81–71 | 12–9 (2–2) | The Legacy Center (1,734); Lake Charles, LA |
| January 29, 2022; 7:00 pm, ESPN+ | | at Houston Baptist | W 73–61 | 13–9 (3–2) | Sharp Gymnasium (901); Houston, TX |
| February 3, 2022; 7:30 pm | | at Incarnate Word | W 63–60 | 14–9 (4–2) | McDermott Center (20); San Antonio, TX |
| February 10, 2022; 7:00 pm | | Incarnate Word | W 69–58 | 15–9 (5–2) | Stopher Gymnasium (401); Thibodaux, LA |
| February 12, 2022; 3:00 pm | | Texas A&M–Corpus Christi | W 83–80 ^{OT} | 16–9 (6–2) | Stopher Gymnasium (332); Thibodaux, LA |
| February 17, 2022; 7:00 pm | | McNeese State | W 82–73 | 17–9 (7–2) | Stopher Gymnasium (1,121); Thibodaux, LA |
| February 19, 2022; 3:00 pm | | Houston Baptist | W 84–70 | 18–9 (8–2) | Stopher Gymnasium (487); Thibodaux, LA |
| February 24, 2022; 7:30 pm | | at Northwestern State | W 80–62 | 19–9 (9–2) | Prather Coliseum (772); Natchitoches, LA |
| February 26, 2022; 4:00 pm, ESPN+ | | at Southeastern Louisiana | L 81–83 | 19–10 (9–3) | University Center (771); Hammond, LA |
| March 2, 2022; 7:30 pm, ESPN+ | | at Texas A&M–Corpus Christi | W 86–75 | 20–10 (10–3) | American Bank Center (1,648); Corpus Christi, TX |
| March 5, 2022; 3:00 pm | | New Orleans | W 92–85 | 21–10 (11–3) | Stopher Gymnasium (1,355); Thibodaux, LA |
Southland tournament
| March 11, 2022; 5:00 pm, ESPN+ | (1) | vs. (4) Texas A&M–Corpus Christi; Semifinals | L 64–71 | 21–11 | Merrell Center; Katy, TX |
NIT
| March 16, 2022; 7:00 pm, ESPN+ | | at (1) SMU; First Round – SMU Bracket | L 58–68 | 21–12 | Moody Coliseum (2,038); University Park, TX |
*Non-conference game. ^{#}Rankings from AP Poll. (#) Tournament seedings in parentheses. All times are in Central.
