= 2021–22 McNeese State Cowboys basketball team =

American college basketball season

2021–22 McNeese State Cowboys basketball
- Conference: Southland Conference
- Record: 11–22 (4–10 Southland)
- Head coach: John Aiken (1st season)
- Associate head coach: Thomas Gray
- Assistant coaches: Michael Moynihan; Tevon Saddler
- Home arena: The Legacy Center; Burton Coliseum

2021–22 Southland Conference men's basketball standings
	Conf.				Overall
Team	W		L	PCT	W		L	PCT
Nicholls	11	–	3	.786	21	–	12	.636
Southeastern Louisiana	10	–	4	.714	19	–	15	.559
New Orleans	10	–	4	.714	18	–	14	.563
Texas A&M–Corpus Christi †	7	–	7	.500	23	–	12	.657
Houston Baptist	6	–	8	.429	11	–	18	.379
Northwestern State	5	–	9	.357	9	–	23	.281
McNeese State	4	–	10	.286	11	–	22	.333
Incarnate Word	3	–	11	.214	7	–	25	.219
† 2022 Southland tournament winner

The 2021–22 McNeese State Cowboys basketball team represented McNeese State University in the 2021–22 NCAA Division I men's basketball season. The Cowboys, led by first-year head coach John Aiken, played their home games at Burton Coliseum until moving to The Legacy Center on January 15, 2022 following hurricane damage repairs, in Lake Charles, Louisiana as members of the Southland Conference.

== Previous season ==
In a season limited due to the ongoing COVID-19 pandemic, the Cowboys finished the 2020–21 season 10–14, 4–10 in Southland play to finish in tenth place. They lost to Southeastern Louisiana in the first round of the Southland tournament.

== Roster ==
2021–22 McNeese State Cowboys men's basketball team
Players
Coaches

Pos.	#	Name	Height	Weight	Year	Hometown
G	0	Trae English	6 ft 0 in (1.83 m)	180 lb (82 kg)	Fr	Baltimore, MD
G	2	Johnathan Massie	6 ft 5 in (1.96 m)	200 lb (91 kg)	Fr	Houston, TX
G	3	Collin Warren	6 ft 4 in (1.93 m)	200 lb (91 kg)	So	Houston, TX
F	5	Myles Lewis	6 ft 5 in (1.96 m)	190 lb (86 kg)	GS	Herndon, VA
G	11	Trevor Passmore	6 ft 4 in (1.93 m)	180 lb (82 kg)	Fr	Houston, TX
F	12	Kellon Taylor	6 ft 6 in (1.98 m)	215 lb (98 kg)	GS	Landover, MD
G	13	Remy Robert II	6 ft 3 in (1.91 m)	195 lb (88 kg)	Jr	Baton Rouge, LA
F	14	Caleb Rawls	6 ft 7 in (2.01 m)	195 lb (88 kg)	Fr	Columbia, MS
G	15	Zach Scott	6 ft 4 in (1.93 m)	175 lb (79 kg)	Jr	Miami, FL
G	22	Harwin Francois	6 ft 5 in (1.96 m)	200 lb (91 kg)	RS Jr	Fort Myers, FL
F	23	Jonathan Lucas	6 ft 8 in (2.03 m)	200 lb (91 kg)	Fr	Jackson, MS
F	24	Christian Shumate	6 ft 7 in (2.01 m)	194 lb (88 kg)	Fr	Chicago, IL
C	35	Brendan Medley-Bacon	7 ft 1 in (2.16 m)	245 lb (111 kg)	Jr	Baltimore, MD
F	50	Shaun Walker	6 ft 8 in (2.03 m)	280 lb (127 kg)	Fr	Houston, TX

Head coach

- John Aiken (Southern Maine)

Assistant coach(es)

- Thomas Gray (Mississippi College)
- Michael Moynihan (North Georgia)
- Tevon Saddler (Nicholls State)

Legend

- (C) Team captain
- (S) Suspended
- (I) Ineligible
- (W) Walk-on
- Injured
- Current redshirt

Roster
Last update: February 2, 2022

== Schedule and results ==
Date time, TV	Rank^{#}	Opponent^{#}	Result	Record	Site (attendance) city, state
Non-conference regular season
November 9, 2021*; 7:00 pm, ESPN+		at SMU	L 62–86	0–1	Moody Coliseum (3,259); Dallas, TX
November 11, 2021*; 7:00 pm, ESPN+		at TCU	L 61–77	0–2	Schollmaier Arena (5,267); Fort Worth, TX
November 15, 2021*; 6:30 pm		Champion Christian	W 116–66	1–2	Burton Coliseum (667); Lake Charles, LA
November 18, 2021*; 7:00 pm, SECN+/ESPN+		at LSU; Emerald Coast Classic campus-site game	L 46–85	1–3	Maravich Center (9,062); Baton Rouge, LA
November 22, 2021*; 6:30 pm		Carver	W 98–54	2–3	Burton Coliseum (1,905); Lake Charles, LA
November 26, 2021*; 11:00 am		vs. St. Francis Brooklyn; Emerald Coast Classic Second Round	W 95–71	3–3	Raider Arena (250); Destin, FL
November 27, 2021*; 12:30 pm		vs. Samford; Emerald Coast Classic Championship	L 75–83	3–4	Raider Arena (125); Destin, FL
December 1, 2021*; 9:00 pm, ESPN+		at Seattle	L 62–78	3–5	Climate Pledge Arena (775); Seattle, WA
December 4, 2021*; 3:00 pm		at Wyoming	L 58-79	3–6	Arena-Auditorium (3,726); Laramie, WY
December 8, 2021*; 7:05 pm, ESPN+		at Louisiana	L 68–83	3–7	Cajundome (2,524); Lafayette, LA
December 16, 2021*; 7:00 pm, CUSA-TV		at UTEP	L 72–82	3–8	Don Haskins Center (5,522); El Paso, TX
December 18, 2021*; 4:00 pm		Dallas Christian	Canceled due to COVID-19 protocols		Burton Coliseum; Lake Charles, LA
December 21, 2021*; 7:00 pm, ESPN+		at Kansas State	L 59–74	3–9	Bramlage Coliseum (5,223); Manhattan, KS
December 30, 2021*; 11:00 am		Ecclesia	W 115–66	4–9	Burton Coliseum (1,101); Lake Charles, LA
January 6, 2022*; 1:30 pm, ESPN+		vs. New Orleans; Southland Basketball Tip-Off First Round	W 92–82 ^{2OT}	5–9	Merrell Center; Katy, TX
January 7, 2022*; 5:00 pm, ESPN+		vs. Southeastern Louisiana; Southland Basketball Tip-Off Semifinals	L 78–83	5–10	Merrell Center; Katy, TX
January 8, 2022*; 5:00 pm, ESPN+		vs. Texas A&M–Corpus Christi; Southland Basketball Tip-Off 3rd Place Game	L 54–67	5–11	Merrell Center; Katy, TX
January 12, 2022; 4:00 pm, ESPN+		Arlington Baptist	W 120–44	6–11	The Legacy Center (150); Lake Charles, LA
Southland Conference season
January 15, 2022; 4:00 pm, ESPN+		Houston Baptist	W 78–75	7–11 (1–0)	The Legacy Center (2,405); Lake Charles, LA
January 20, 2022; 7:30 pm, ESPN+		at Texas A&M–Corpus Christi	L 56–60	7–12 (1–1)	American Bank Center (1,023); Corpus Christi, TX
January 22, 2022; 4:00 pm		at Incarnate Word	W 82–72	8–12 (2–1)	McDermott Center (216); San Antonio, TX
January 27, 2022; 7:30 pm		Nicholls	L 71–81	8–13 (2–2)	The Legacy Center (1,734); Lake Charles, LA
January 30, 2022; 5:00 pm, ESPNU		New Orleans	L 78–84	8–14 (2–3)	The Legacy Center (1,712); Lake Charles, LA
February 3, 2022; 7:30 pm		Southeastern Louisiana	L 78–83	8–15 (2–4)	The Legacy Center (1,435); Lake Charles, LA
February 5, 2022; 4:00 pm		Northwestern State	W 93–84	9–15 (3–4)	The Legacy Center (2,115); Lake Charles, LA
February 10, 2022; 8:00 pm, ESPN+		at Southeastern Louisiana	L 86–91	9–16 (3–5)	University Center (743); Hammond, LA
February 12, 2022; 3:00 pm, ESPN+		at Northwestern State	W 80–75	10–16 (4–5)	Prather Coliseum (738); Natchitoches, LA
February 17, 2022; 7:00 pm		at Nicholls	L 73–82	10–17 (4–6)	Stopher Gym (1,121); Thibodaux, LA
February 19, 2022; 4:00 pm, ESPN+		at New Orleans	L 75–88	10–18 (4–7)	Lakefront Arena (1,245); New Orleans, LA
February 24, 2022; 7:30 pm		Texas A&M–Corpus Christi	L 53–65	10–19 (4–8)	The Legacy Center (1,474); Lake Charles, LA
February 26, 2022; 4:00 pm, ESPN+		Incarnate Word	L 67–69	10–20 (4–9)	The Legacy Center (1,643); Lake Charles, LA
March 5, 2022; 7:00 pm		at Houston Baptist	L 144–149 ^{4OT}	10–21 (4–10)	Sharp Gym (792); Houston, TX
Southland tournament
March 9, 2022; 7:30 pm, ESPN+	(7)	vs. (6) Northwestern State; First round	W 80–67	11–21	Merrell Center; Katy, TX
March 10, 2022; 7:30 pm, ESPN+	(7)	vs. (3) New Orleans; Second round	L 78–82	11–22	Merrell Center; Katy, TX
*Non-conference game. ^{#}Rankings from AP Poll. (#) Tournament seedings in parentheses. All times are in Central.
