= 2021–22 Houston Baptist Huskies men's basketball team =

American college basketball season

2021–22 Houston Baptist Huskies men's basketball
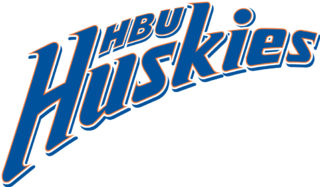
- Conference: Southland Conference
- Record: 11–18 (6–8 Southland)
- Head coach: Ron Cottrell (31st season)
- Assistant coaches: Steven Key; Jud Kinne; Byron Rimm II
- Home arena: Sharp Gymnasium

2021–22 Southland Conference men's basketball standings
	Conf.				Overall
Team	W		L	PCT	W		L	PCT
Nicholls	11	–	3	.786	21	–	12	.636
Southeastern Louisiana	10	–	4	.714	19	–	15	.559
New Orleans	10	–	4	.714	18	–	14	.563
Texas A&M–Corpus Christi †	7	–	7	.500	23	–	12	.657
Houston Baptist	6	–	8	.429	11	–	18	.379
Northwestern State	5	–	9	.357	9	–	23	.281
McNeese State	4	–	10	.286	11	–	22	.333
Incarnate Word	3	–	11	.214	7	–	25	.219
† 2022 Southland tournament winner

The 2021–22 Houston Baptist Huskies men's basketball team represented Houston Baptist University, now known as Houston Christian University, in the 2021–22 NCAA Division I men's basketball season. The Huskies, led by 31st-year head coach Ron Cottrell, played their home games at Sharp Gymnasium in Houston, Texas as members of the Southland Conference. They finished the season 11–18, 6–8 in Southland play to finish in fifth place. They defeated Incarnate Word in the first round of the Southland tournament before losing to Texas A&M–Corpus Christi.

On September 21, 2022, the university announced that it had changed its name to Houston Christian University. The Huskies nickname was not affected.

== Previous season ==
In a season limited due to the ongoing COVID-19 pandemic, the Huskies finished the 2020–21 season 6–19, 4–11 in Southland play to finish in eleventh place. They upset Incarnate Word in the first round of the Southland tournament, before falling to Lamar in the second round.

== Roster ==
2021–22 Houston Baptist Huskies men's basketball team
Players
Coaches

Pos.	#	Name	Height	Weight	Year	Hometown
C	0	Zach Iyeyemi	6 ft 9 in (2.06 m)	250 lb (113 kg)	Jr	Cypress, TX
G	2	Za-Ontay Boothman	6 ft 1 in (1.85 m)	175 lb (79 kg)	So	Buckeye, AZ
G	3	Brycen Long	6 ft 2 in (1.88 m)	175 lb (79 kg)	So	Gilbert, AZ
G	5	Hunter Janacek	6 ft 5 in (1.96 m)	185 lb (84 kg)	Sr	Houston, TX
G	10	Jade Tse	6 ft 1 in (1.85 m)	185 lb (84 kg)	So	Queens, NY
F	11	Jason Thompson	6 ft 7 in (2.01 m)	195 lb (88 kg)	Jr	Charlotte, NC
F	12	Deshon Proctor	6 ft 5 in (1.96 m)	205 lb (93 kg)	Fr	Tyrone, GA
G	13	Khristion Courseault	6 ft 2 in (1.88 m)	180 lb (82 kg)	Jr	Los Angeles, CA
G	14	Andre Charles Jr.	6 ft 0 in (1.83 m)	170 lb (77 kg)	Sr	Houston, TX
F	15	Zion Tordoff	6 ft 8 in (2.03 m)	225 lb (102 kg)	Sr	Bradford, England
F	21	Tristan Moore	6 ft 7 in (2.01 m)	195 lb (88 kg)	Fr	Albuquerque, NM
G	22	Marques Gates	6 ft 0 in (1.83 m)	170 lb (77 kg)	Fr	Selma, TX
G/F	23	Darius Lee	6 ft 6 in (1.98 m)	230 lb (104 kg)	Sr	Harlem, NY
G	24	Jake Arnold	6 ft 2 in (1.88 m)	185 lb (84 kg)	Fr	Katy, TX
G/F	25	Collin Plummer	6 ft 5 in (1.96 m)	175 lb (79 kg)	So	Missouri City, TX
F	33	Sam Hofman	6 ft 5 in (1.96 m)	255 lb (116 kg)	Jr	Brussels, Belgium

Head coach

- Ron Cottrell (Arkansas)

Assistant coach(es)

- Steven Key (Houston Baptist)
- Jud Kinne (Albion)
- Byron Rimm II (Cal State LA)

Legend

- (C) Team captain
- (S) Suspended
- (I) Ineligible
- (W) Walk-on
- Injured
- Current redshirt

Roster
Last update: February 3, 2022

== Schedule and results ==
Date time, TV	Rank^{#}	Opponent^{#}	Result	Record	Site (attendance) city, state
Non-conference Regular season
November 9, 2021*; 8:00 pm, LHN		at Texas	L 48–92	0–1	Frank Erwin Center (14,863); Austin, TX
November 13, 2021*; 7:00 pm		Barclay	W 122–44	1–1	Sharp Gymnasium (490); Houston, TX
November 17, 2021*; 12:00 pm, SECN+/ESPN+		at Texas A&M	L 39–73	1–2	Reed Arena (4,409); College Station, TX
November 21, 2021*; 3:00 pm		at Denver	L 61–74	1–3	Hamilton Gymnasium (550); Denver, CO
November 24, 2021*; 7:00 pm, BSOK		at Oklahoma	L 40–57	1–4	Lloyd Noble Center (5,828); Norman, OK
November 29, 2021*; 7:00 pm		Southwestern Adventist	W 100–62	2–4	Sharp Gymnasium (523); Houston, TX
December 4, 2021*; 7:00 pm		Oral Roberts	L 67–85	2–5	Sharp Gymnasium (1,000); Houston, TX
December 7, 2021*; 7:00 pm		Champion Christian	W 84–67	3–5	Sharp Gymnasium (376); Houston, TX
December 11, 2021*; 7:00 pm		Rice	L 73–88	3–6	Sharp Gymnasium (703); Houston, TX
December 21, 2021*; 6:00 pm		at FIU	Canceled due to COVID-19 protocols		Ocean Bank Convocation Center; Miami, FL
January 3, 2022*; 3:00 pm		Ecclesia	W 94–63	4–6	Sharp Gymnasium (201); Houston, TX
January 6, 2022*; 11:00 am, ESPN+		vs. Southeastern Louisiana; Southland Basketball Tip-Off First Round	L 81–90	4–7	Merrell Center; Katy, TX
January 7, 2022*; 11:00 am, ESPN+		vs. New Orleans; Southland Basketball Tip-Off Consolation 2nd Round	L 65–81	4–8	Merrell Center; Katy, TX
January 8, 2022*; 11:00 am, ESPN+		vs. Incarnate Word; Southland Basketball Tip-Off 7th Place Game	L 50–60	4–9	Merrell Center; Katy, TX
Southland Conference season
January 15, 2022; 4:00 pm, ESPN+		at McNeese State	L 75–78	4–10 (0–1)	The Legacy Center (2,405); Lake Charles, LA
January 20, 2022; 7:30 pm		at Incarnate Word	W 68–65	5–10 (1–1)	McDermott Center (181); San Antonio, TX
January 22, 2022; 3:30 pm, ESPN+		at Texas A&M–Corpus Christi	W 77–71	6–10 (2–1)	American Bank Center (1,343); Corpus Christi, TX
January 27, 2022; 7:00 pm		New Orleans	L 66–77	6–11 (2–2)	Sharp Gymnasium (742); Houston, TX
January 29, 2022; 7:00 pm, ESPN+		Nicholls	L 61–73	6–12 (2–3)	Sharp Gymnasium (901); Houston, TX
February 3, 2022; 7:00 pm, ESPN+		Northwestern State	L 87–97	6–13 (2–4)	Sharp Gymnasium (462); Houston, TX
February 5, 2022; 7:00 pm, ESPN+		Southeastern Louisiana	W 93–80	7–13 (3–4)	Sharp Gymnasium (721); Houston, TX
February 10, 2022; 7:30 pm		at Northwestern State	W 76–69	8–13 (4–4)	Prather Coliseum (1,202); Natchitoches, LA
February 12, 2022; 4:00 pm, ESPN+		at Southeastern Louisiana	L 84–89	8–14 (4–5)	University Center (558); Hammond, LA
February 19, 2022; 3:00 pm		at Nicholls	W 84–70	8–15 (4–6)	Stopher Gym (487); Thibodaux, LA
February 24, 2022; 7:00 pm, ESPN+		Incarnate Word	W 82–68	9–15 (5–6)	Sharp Gymnasium (594); Houston, TX
February 26, 2022; 7:00 pm, ESPN+		Texas A&M–Corpus Christi	L 70–75	9–16 (5–7)	Sharp Gymnasium (694); Houston, TX
March 2, 2022; 7:00 pm, ESPN+		at New Orleans	L 74–75	9–17 (5–8)	Lakefront Arena (1,002); New Orleans, LA
March 5, 2022; 7:00 pm, ESPN+		McNeese State	W 149–144 ^{4OT}	10–17 (6–8)	Sharp Gym (792); Houston, TX
Southland tournament
March 9, 2022; 5:00 pm, ESPN+	(5)	vs. (8) Incarnate Word; First round	W 74–64	11–17	Merrell Center (650); Katy, TX
March 10, 2022; 5:00 pm, ESPN+	(5)	vs. (4) Texas A&M–Corpus Christi; Second round	L 60–75	11–18	Merrell Center; Katy, TX
*Non-conference game. ^{#}Rankings from AP Poll. (#) Tournament seedings in parentheses. All times are in Central.
