= 2021–22 Southeastern Louisiana Lions basketball team =

American college basketball season

2021–22 Southeastern Louisiana Lions basketball

Southland Basketball Tip-Off champions

The Basketball Classic, first round
- Conference: Southland Conference
- Record: 19–15 (10–4 Southland)
- Head coach: David Kiefer (3rd season)
- Assistant coaches: Mark Lieberman; Riley Conroy; Roger Woods
- Home arena: University Center (Capacity: 7,500)

2021–22 Southland Conference men's basketball standings
	Conf.				Overall
Team	W		L	PCT	W		L	PCT
Nicholls	11	–	3	.786	21	–	12	.636
Southeastern Louisiana	10	–	4	.714	19	–	15	.559
New Orleans	10	–	4	.714	18	–	14	.563
Texas A&M–Corpus Christi †	7	–	7	.500	23	–	12	.657
Houston Baptist	6	–	8	.429	11	–	18	.379
Northwestern State	5	–	9	.357	9	–	23	.281
McNeese State	4	–	10	.286	11	–	22	.333
Incarnate Word	3	–	11	.214	7	–	25	.219
† 2022 Southland tournament winner

The 2021–22 Southeastern Louisiana Lions basketball team represented Southeastern Louisiana University during the 2021–22 NCAA Division I men's basketball season. The Lions were led by third-year head coach David Kiefer, and played their home games at the University Center in Hammond, Louisiana as members of the Southland Conference (SoCon).

The Lions finished the season 19–15, 10–4 in Southland play, to finish tied for second place. They defeated New Orleans in the semifinals of the Southland tournament before falling to Texas A&M–Corpus Christi in the championship game. They were invited to The Basketball Classic, where they lost to South Alabama in the first round.

== Previous season ==
In a season limited due to the ongoing COVID-19 pandemic, the Lions finished the 2020–21 season 8–18, 5–10 in Southland play, to finish in ninth place. They defeated McNeese State in the first round of the Southland tournament before losing to New Orleans.

== Roster ==
2021–22 Southeastern Louisiana Lions men's basketball team
Players
Coaches

Pos.	#	Name	Height	Weight	Year	Previous school	Hometown
F	0	Jalyn Hinton	6 ft 6 in (1.98 m)	200 lb (91 kg)	Sr	The Governor's Academy; Florida Southern College	Boston, MA
G	1	Avery Wilson	6 ft 4 in (1.93 m)	225 lb (102 kg)	RS Jr	Forest Park HS; Boston College	Forest Park, GA
G	2	Roscoe Eastmond	5 ft 9 in (1.75 m)	150 lb (68 kg)	So	Wheeler HS; Denver	Marietta, GA
G	3	Roger McFarlane	6 ft 5 in (1.96 m)	205 lb (93 kg)	RS Fr	University HS; Dodge City JC	Fort Lauderdale, FL
G	4	Keon Clergeot	6 ft 1 in (1.85 m)	190 lb (86 kg)	Sr	Auburndale HS; UMass	Winter Haven, FL
G	5	Gage Larvadain (W)	5 ft 10 in (1.78 m)	160 lb (73 kg)	Fr	Riverside Academy	Donaldsonville, LA
G	10	JonDarius Warren	6 ft 0 in (1.83 m)	190 lb (86 kg)	Jr	Corinth HS; Northeast JC	Corinth, MS
G	12	Matthew Strange	5 ft 11 in (1.8 m)	170 lb (77 kg)	RS Jr	St. Pius HS; New Mexico JC	The Woodlands, TX
F	13	Antonio Gordon	6 ft 9 in (2.06 m)	215 lb (98 kg)	So	Eisenhower HS; Kansas State	Lawton, OK
G	21	Ryan Burkhardt	6 ft 5 in (1.96 m)	185 lb (84 kg)	Sr	St. Augustine HS; North Florida	St. Augustine, FL
G/F	22	Nick Caldwell	6 ft 7 in (2.01 m)	215 lb (98 kg)	So	Dutchtown HS	Prairieville, LA
G	25	Joe Kasperzyk	6 ft 3 in (1.91 m)	190 lb (86 kg)	Jr	Hillhouse HS; Odessa College	New Haven, CT
C	33	Max Brackmann	7 ft 2 in (2.18 m)	270 lb (122 kg)	RS Fr	Staedtische Loehne	Löhne, Germany
G/F	35	Gus Okafor	6 ft 6 in (1.98 m)	230 lb (104 kg)	Jr	Eleanor Roosevelt HS; Miami Dade College	Baltimore, MD

Head coach

- David Kiefer (Kansas State)

Assistant coach(es)

- Mark Lieberman (FIU)
- Riley Conroy (Tulane)
- Roger Woods (Little Rock)

Legend

- (C) Team captain
- (S) Suspended
- (I) Ineligible
- (W) Walk-on
- Injured
- Current redshirt

Roster
Last update: February 2, 2022

== Schedule and results ==
Date time, TV	Rank^{#}	Opponent^{#}	Result	Record	Site (attendance) city, state
Non-conference regular season
November 9, 2021*; 7:00 p.m., ESPN+		at Tulane	L 67–70	0–1	Devlin Fieldhouse (1,132); New Orleans, LA
November 12, 2021*; 7:00 p.m., ESPN+		Southeastern Baptist	W 128–58	1–1	University Center (381); Hammond, LA
November 14, 2021*; 1:00 p.m., ESPN+		Paul Quinn	W 77–60	2–1	University Center (462); Hammond, LA
November 18, 2021*; 7:00 p.m., ESPN+		at SMU	L 61–78	2–2	Moody Coliseum (3,020); Dallas, TX
November 22, 2021*; 7:00 p.m., ESPN+		Ecclesia	W 121–79	3–2	University Center (364); Hammond, LA
November 26, 2021*; 3:30 p.m., ESPN+		vs. Purdue Fort Wayne; Hilton Garden Inn FGCU Invitational	L 66–74	3–3	Alico Arena (113); Fort Myers, FL
November 27, 2021*; 6:00 p.m., ESPN+		at Florida Gulf Coast; Hilton Garden Inn FGCU Invitational	L 71–90	3–4	Alico Arena (1,857); Fort Myers, FL
November 28, 2021*; 12:30 p.m., ESPN+		vs. Western Michigan; Hilton Garden Inn FGCU Invitational	L 77–81	3–5	Alico Arena (212); Fort Myers, FL
December 5, 2021*; 4:00 p.m., ESPN+		at Troy	W 72–68	4–5	Trojan Arena (1,805); Troy, AL
December 11, 2021*; 5:30 p.m.		at Southern	L 66–72	4–6	F. G. Clark Center (1,725); Baton Rouge, LA
December 14, 2021*; 5:00 p.m., ACCNX		at Louisville	L 60–86	4–7	KFC Yum! Center (12,247); Louisville, KY
December 19, 2021*; 12:00 p.m., ESPN+		at No. 11 Iowa State	L 54–77	4–8	Hilton Coliseum (11,809); Ames, IA
December 21, 2021*; 7:00 p.m.		at Iowa	L 62–93	4–9	Carver–Hawkeye Arena (10,891); Iowa City, IA
December 29, 2021*; 7:00 p.m., ESPN+		Millsaps	Canceled due to COVID-19 protocols		University Center; Hammond, LA
January 6, 2022*; 11:00 a.m., ESPN+		vs. Houston Baptist; Southland Basketball Tip-Off first round	W 90–81	5–9	Merrell Center; Katy, TX
January 7, 2022*; 5:00 p.m., ESPN+		vs. McNeese State; Southland Basketball Tip-Off semifinals	W 83–78	6–9	Merrell Center; Katy, TX
January 8, 2022*; 7:30 p.m., ESPN+		vs. Nicholls; Southland Basketball Tip-Off championship	W 77–72	7–9	Merrell Center; Katy, TX
January 12, 2022*; 7:00 p.m.		Tougaloo	W 77–72	8–9	University Center (386); Hammond, LA
Southland Conference season
January 15, 2022; 4:00 p.m., ESPN+		Northwestern State	W 79–74	9–9 (1–0)	University Center (375); Hammond, LA
January 20, 2022; 7:00 p.m., ESPN+		at New Orleans	L 72–78	9–10 (1–1)	Lakefront Arena (921); New Orleans, LA
January 22, 2022; 3:00 p.m., ESPN+		at Nicholls	W 101–93	10–10 (2–1)	Stopher Gym (501); Thibodaux, LA
January 27, 2022; 8:00 p.m., ESPN+		Texas A&M–Corpus Christi	L 71–86	10–11 (2–2)	University Center (670); Hammond, LA
January 29, 2022; 4:00 p.m., ESPN+		Incarnate Word	W 78–68	11–11 (3–2)	University Center (545); Hammond, LA
February 3, 2022; 7:30 p.m.		at McNeese State	W 83–78	12–11 (4–2)	The Legacy Center (1,435); Lake Charles, LA
February 5, 2022; 7:00 p.m., ESPN+		at Houston Baptist	L 80–93	12–12 (4–3)	Sharp Gym (721); Houston, TX
February 10, 2022; 8:00 p.m., ESPN+		McNeese State	W 91–86	13–12 (5–3)	University Center (743); Hammond, LA
February 12, 2022; 4:00 p.m., ESPN+		Houston Baptist	W 89–84	14–12 (6–3)	University Center (558); Hammond, LA
February 17, 2022; 7:30 p.m., ESPN+		at Texas A&M–Corpus Christi	W 83–74	15–12 (7–3)	American Bank Center (1,458); Corpus Christi, TX
February 19, 2022; 4:00 p.m.		at Incarnate Word	L 84–92	15–13 (7–4)	McDermott Center (269); San Antonio, TX
February 24, 2022; 8:00 p.m., ESPN+		New Orleans	W 84–79	16–13 (8–4)	University Center (621); Hammond, LA
February 26, 2022; 4:00 p.m., ESPN+		Nicholls	W 83–81	17–13 (9–4)	University Center (771); Hammond, LA
March 5, 2022; 3:00 p.m., ESPN+		at Northwestern State	W 85–80	18–13 (10–4)	Prather Coliseum (654); Natchitoches, LA
Southland tournament
March 11, 2022; 7:30 p.m., ESPN+	(2)	vs. (3) New Orleans; Semifinals	W 74–65	19–13	Merrell Center; Katy, TX
March 12, 2022; 8:30 p.m., ESPN2	(2)	vs. (4) Texas A&M–Corpus Christi; Championship	L 65–73	19–14	Merrell Center; Katy, TX
The Basketball Classic
March 16, 2022*; 7:00 p.m., ESPN+		at South Alabama; First round – The Travis Grant Game	L 68–70	19–15	Mitchell Center (885); Mobile, AL
*Non-conference game. ^{#}Rankings from AP poll. (#) Tournament seedings in parentheses. All times are in Central.
