= 2021–22 Incarnate Word Cardinals men's basketball team =

2019–20 Incarnate Word Cardinals men's basketball team

2021–22 Incarnate Word Cardinals men's basketball
- Conference: Southland Conference
- Record: 7–25 (3–11 Southland)
- Head coach: Carson Cunningham (4th season)
- Assistant coaches: Taylor Land (4th season); Chris Artis (3rd season); Carlito Labarda (1st season)
- Home arena: McDermott Center (Capacity: 2,000)

2021–22 Southland Conference men's basketball standings
	Conf.				Overall
Team	W		L	PCT	W		L	PCT
Nicholls	11	–	3	.786	21	–	12	.636
Southeastern Louisiana	10	–	4	.714	19	–	15	.559
New Orleans	10	–	4	.714	18	–	14	.563
Texas A&M–Corpus Christi †	7	–	7	.500	23	–	12	.657
Houston Baptist	6	–	8	.429	11	–	18	.379
Northwestern State	5	–	9	.357	9	–	23	.281
McNeese State	4	–	10	.286	11	–	22	.333
Incarnate Word	3	–	11	.214	7	–	25	.219
† 2022 Southland tournament winner

The 2021–22 Incarnate Word Cardinals men's basketball team represented the University of the Incarnate Word during the 2021–22 NCAA Division I men's basketball season. The Cardinals were led by fourth-year head coach Carson Cunningham and played their home games at McDermott Convocation Center in San Antonio, Texas as members of the Southland Conference. They finished the season 7–25, 3–11 in Southland play to finish in last place. They lost in the first round of the Southland tournament to Houston Baptist.

== Previous season ==
In a season limited due to the ongoing COVID-19 pandemic, the Cardinals finished the 2020–21 season 8–14, 5–9 in Southland play to finish in eighth place. They lost Houston Baptist in the first round of the Southland tournament.

== Roster ==
2021–22 Incarnate Word Cardinals men's basketball team
Players
Coaches

Pos.	#	Name	Height	Weight	Year	Previous school	Hometown
F	0	Bradley Akhile	6 ft 7 in (2.01 m)	200 lb (91 kg)	Sr	Gillette College	Houston, TX
G	1	Robert "RJ" Glasper	6 ft 0 in (1.83 m)	180 lb (82 kg)	GS	Oral Roberts	Forrest City, AR
G	2	Charlie Yoder	6 ft 4 in (1.93 m)	190 lb (86 kg)	Fr	Spire Institute	LaGrange, IN
G	3	Drew Lutz	6 ft 1 in (1.85 m)	175 lb (79 kg)	Jr	Penn HS	Granger, IN
F	4	Davante Dennis	6 ft 7 in (2.01 m)	220 lb (100 kg)	Fr	Red Lion Area Senior HS	Baltimore, MD
G	5	Brandon Swaby	6 ft 3 in (1.91 m)	195 lb (88 kg)	RS Jr	Northeast HS	Fort Lauderdale, FL
G	10	Sese Hassan Mobutu	6 ft 3 in (1.91 m)	185 lb (84 kg)	Fr	Olympus Prep	Gbadolite, DR Congo
F	11	Johnny Hughes III	6 ft 8 in (2.03 m)	210 lb (95 kg)	GS	Mount Olive	Fayetteville, NC
G/F	12	Dylan Hayman	6 ft 6 in (1.98 m)	190 lb (86 kg)	Fr	Healdsburg HS	Healdsburg, CA
G	13	Josh Morgan	6 ft 3 in (1.91 m)	215 lb (98 kg)	So	Father Henry Carr Secondary School	Brampton, ON
F	14	Logan Bracamonte	6 ft 5 in (1.96 m)	210 lb (95 kg)	So	Randolph HS	Honolulu, HI
C	15	Kevin Schutte	6 ft 9 in (2.06 m)	240 lb (109 kg)	GS	Hofstra	Zwolle, Netherlands
G	20	Bryon Armstrong	6 ft 2 in (1.88 m)	240 lb (109 kg)	Fr	Antonian College Prep	San Antonio, TX
F	21	Thomas Zevgaras	6 ft 8 in (2.03 m)	214 lb (97 kg)	So	Athinaiki Agogi & Paideia	Karditsa, Greece
F	23	Godsgift "GG" Ezedinma	6 ft 7 in (2.01 m)	205 lb (93 kg)	So	Midway HS	Enugu, Nigeria
F/C	24	Benjamin Griscti	6 ft 11 in (2.11 m)	220 lb (100 kg)	Fr	Cabra Dominican College	Adelaide, Australia
G	25	Reggie Abram	5 ft 9 in (1.75 m)	165 lb (75 kg)	Fr	Hammond HS	Merrillville, IN
F	33	Jacob Teer	6 ft 7 in (2.01 m)	225 lb (102 kg)	Fr	St. Anthony Catholic HS	San Antonio, TX

Head coach

- Carson Cunningham (Purdue)

Assistant coach(es)

- Taylor Land (St. Edward's)
- Chris Artis (Valparaiso)
- Carlito Labarda (Purdue)

Legend

- (C) Team captain
- (S) Suspended
- (I) Ineligible
- (W) Walk-on
- Injured
- Current redshirt

Roster
Last update: February 5, 2022

== Schedule and results ==
Date time, TV	Rank^{#}	Opponent^{#}	Result	Record	Site (attendance) city, state
Non-conference Regular season
November 9, 2021*; 6:30 pm		Texas State	L 57–75	0–1	McDermott Center (657); San Antonio, TX
November 12, 2021*; 7:30 pm, Big 12 Now		at No. 8 Baylor	L 60–87	0–2	Ferrell Center (8,895); Waco, TX
November 16, 2021*; 6:30 pm		Concordia (TX)	L 78–82	0–3	McDermott Center (369); San Antonio, TX
November 20, 2021*; 4:00 pm, Big 12 Now		vs. Texas Tech; South Padre Island Battle on the Beach	L 62–84	0–4	South Padre Island Convention Centre (1,340); South Padre Island, TX
November 26, 2021*; 12:00 pm		Southeast Missouri State; UIW Thanksgiving Invitational	L 76–79	0–5	McDermott Center; San Antonio, TX
November 27, 2021*; 11:30 am		Montana State; UIW Thanksgiving Invitational	L 64–83	0–6	McDermott Center (100); San Antonio, TX
November 28, 2021*; 2:00 pm		Portland; UIW Thanksgiving Invitational	L 68–77	0–7	McDermott Center (195); San Antonio, TX
December 1, 2021*; 6:30 pm		Our Lady of the Lake	W 93–66	1–7	McDermott Center (224); San Antonio, TX
December 4, 2021*; 3:00 pm, ESPN+		at Abilene Christian	L 65–98	1–8	Teague Center (842); Abilene, TX
December 11, 2021*; 2:30 pm		Grambling State	W 72–62	2–8	McDermott Center (227); San Antonio, TX
December 16, 2021*; 11:15 am		at Rice	L 55–85	2–9	Tudor Fieldhouse (2,021); Houston, TX
December 20, 2021*; 7:00 pm, BTN		at No. 3 Purdue	L 59–79	2–10	Mackey Arena (14,804); West Lafayette, IN
December 28, 2021*; 7:30 pm, LHN		at No. 17 Texas	L 33–78	2–11	Frank Erwin Center (11,197); Austin, TX
Dec 30, 2021*; 6:30 pm		Trinity	Canceled due to COVID-19 protocols		McDermott Center; San Antonio, TX
January 1, 2022*; 4:00 pm		Dallas Christian	W 90–45	3–11	McDermott Center (157); San Antonio, TX
January 6, 2022*; 7:30 pm, ESPN+		vs. Nicholls; Southland Basketball Tip-Off First Round	L 56–87	3–12	Merrell Center (102); Katy, TX
January 7, 2022*; 1:30 pm, ESPN+		vs. Northwestern State; Southland Basketball Tip-Off Consolation 2nd Round	L 80–83	3–13	Merrell Center; Katy, TX
January 8, 2022*; 11:00 am, ESPN+		vs. Houston Baptist; Southland Basketball Tip-Off 7th Place Game	W 60–50	4–13	Merrell Center (101); Katy, TX
Southland Regular season
January 15, 2022; 3:30 pm, ESPN+		at Texas A&M–Corpus Christi	L 64–80	4–14 (0–1)	American Bank Center (1,007); Corpus Christi, TX
January 20, 2022; 7:30 pm		Houston Baptist	L 65–68	4–15 (0–2)	McDermott Center (181); San Antonio, TX
January 22, 2022; 4:00 pm		McNeese State	L 72–82	4–16 (0–3)	McDermott Center (216); San Antonio, TX
January 27, 2022; 7:30 pm		at Northwestern State	L 70–79	4–17 (0–4)	Prather Coliseum (1,022); Natchitoches, LA
January 29, 2022; 4:00 pm, ESPN+		at Southeastern Louisiana	L 68–78	4–18 (0–5)	University Center (545); Hammond, LA
February 3, 2022; 7:30 pm		Nicholls	L 60–63	4–19 (0–6)	McDermott Center (20); San Antonio, TX
February 5, 2022; 4:00 pm, ESPN+		New Orleans	W 78–70	5–19 (1–6)	McDermott Center (273); San Antonio, TX
February 10, 2022; 7:00 pm		at Nicholls	L 58–69	5–20 (1–7)	Stopher Gymnasium (401); Thibodaux, LA
February 12, 2022; 4:00 pm, ESPN+		at New Orleans	L 57–84	5–21 (1–8)	Lakefront Arena (1,127); New Orleans, LA
February 17, 2022; 7:30 pm		Northwestern State	L 64–88	5–22 (1–9)	McDermott Center (267); San Antonio, TX
February 19, 2022; 4:00 pm		Southeastern Louisiana	W 92–84	6–22 (2–9)	McDermott Center (269); San Antonio, TX
February 24, 2022; 7:00 pm, ESPN+		at Houston Baptist	L 68–82	6–23 (2–10)	Sharp Gymnasium (594); Houston, TX
February 26, 2022; 3:00 pm, ESPN+		at McNeese State	W 69–67	7–23 (3–10)	The Legacy Center (1,643); Lake Charles, LA
March 5, 2022; 4:00 pm		Texas A&M–Corpus Christi	L 68–77	7–24 (3–11)	McDermott Center (737); San Antonio, TX
Southland tournament
March 9, 2022; 5:00 pm, ESPN+	(8)	vs. (5) Houston Baptist; First round	L 64–74	7–25	Merrell Center; Katy, TX
*Non-conference game. ^{#}Rankings from AP Poll. (#) Tournament seedings in parentheses. All times are in Central Time.
