= 2021–22 SMU Mustangs men's basketball team =

American college basketball season

2021–22 SMU Mustangs men's basketball
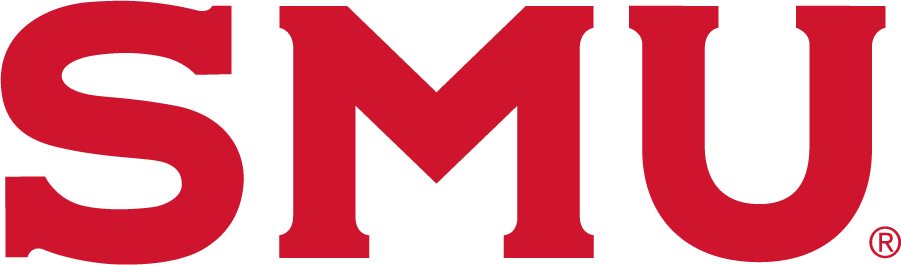

NIT, Second Round
- Conference: American Athletic Conference
- Record: 24–9 (13–4 AAC)
- Head coach: Tim Jankovich (6th season)
- Assistant coaches: Jay Duncan; Yaphett King; John Cooper
- Home arena: Moody Coliseum

2021–22 American Athletic Conference men's basketball standings
	Conf.				Overall
Team	W		L	PCT	W		L	PCT
No. 15 Houston †	15	–	3	.833	32	–	6	.842
SMU	13	–	4	.765	24	–	9	.727
Memphis	13	–	5	.722	22	–	11	.667
Temple	10	–	7	.588	17	–	12	.586
Tulane	10	–	8	.556	14	–	15	.483
UCF	9	–	9	.500	18	–	12	.600
Wichita State	6	–	9	.400	15	–	13	.536
Cincinnati	7	–	11	.389	18	–	15	.545
East Carolina	6	–	11	.353	15	–	15	.500
Tulsa	4	–	14	.222	11	–	20	.355
South Florida	3	–	15	.167	8	–	23	.258
† 2022 AAC tournament winner Rankings from AP poll

The 2021–22 SMU Mustangs men's basketball team represented Southern Methodist University during the 2021–22 NCAA Division I men's basketball season. The Mustangs were led by sixth-year head coach Tim Jankovich and played their home games at Moody Coliseum on their campus in University Park, Texas as members of the American Athletic Conference. They finished the season 24–9, 13–4 in AAC play to finish in second place. They defeated Tulsa in the quarterfinals of the AAC tournament before losing to Memphis in the semifinals. They received an at-large bid to the National Invitation Tournament as a No. 1 seed. They defeated Nichols in the first round before losing to Washington State in the second round.

On March 22, 2022, head coach Tim Jankovich announced his retirement from coaching. On March 27, the school named Georgia State head coach Rob Lanier the team's new head coach.

== Previous season ==
In a season limited due to the ongoing COVID-19 pandemic, the Mustangs finished the 2020–21 season 11–6, 7–4 in AAC play to finish in fourth place. They lost in the quarterfinals of the AAC tournament to Cincinnati. They were invited to the NIT where they lost in the first round to Boise State.

== Offseason ==
=== Departures ===
Name	Number	Pos.	Height	Weight	Year	Hometown	Reason for departure
Tyson Jolly	0	G	6'4"	190	RS Senior	Muskogee, OK	Graduate transferred to Iona
Feron Hunt	1	F	6'8"	195	Junior	DeSoto, TX	Declared for the 2021 NBA draft
Darius McNeill	2	G	6'3"	185	RS Junior	Houston, TX	Graduate transferred to UTSA
Charles Smith IV	4	G	6'5"	185	Sophomore	Atlanta, GA	Transferred to Old Dominion
Yor Anei	10	F	6'10"	235	Junior	Overland Park, KS	Transferred to DePaul
William Douglas	14	G	6'5"	193	RS Junior	Memphis, TN	Graduate transferred to Prairie View A&M
Alex Tabor Jr.	23	G	6'2"	175	Sophomore	Charlotte, NC	Walk-on; didn't return
Everett Ray	24	F	6'7"	220	RS Junior	Irving, TX	Graduate transferred
Ethan Chargois	25	F	6'9"	235	Senior	Tulsa, OK	Graduate transferred to Oklahoma

=== Incoming transfers ===
Name	Num	Pos.	Height	Weight	Year	Hometown	Previous school
Zach Nutall	10	G	6'3"	185	Senior	Bryan, TX	Sam Houston State
Michael Weathers	23	G	6'3"	175	RS Senior	Roeland Park, KS	Texas Southern
Tristan Clark	25	F	6'10"	245	Senior	San Antonio, TX	Baylor
Franklin Agunanne	33	F	6'9"	245	RS Junior	Abuja, Nigeria	Loyola–Chicago
Marcus Weathers	50	F	6'5"	215	Graduate Student	Roeland Park, KS	Duquesne

=== 2021 recruiting class ===
College recruiting information
Name	Hometown	School	Height	Weight	Commit date
Zhuric Phelps #19 PG	Midland, TX	Duncanville High School	6 ft 3 in (1.91 m)	180 lb (82 kg)	Oct 21, 2020
Zhuric Phelps #19 PG	Recruit ratings: Rivals: 247Sports: ESPN: (82)				
Tyler Lundblade #58 SG	Dallas, TX	Greensboro Day School	6 ft 4 in (1.93 m)	185 lb (84 kg)	Apr 23, 2021
Tyler Lundblade #58 SG	Recruit ratings: Rivals: 247Sports: ESPN: (75)				
Jalen Smith; PG	Orlando, Florida	Oak Ridge High School	6 ft 3 in (1.91 m)	180 lb (82 kg)	Aug 30, 2020
Jalen Smith; PG	Recruit ratings: Rivals: 247Sports: ESPN: (NR)				
Stefan Todorović; SG	Belgrade, Serbia	Prolific Prep	6 ft 8 in (2.03 m)	N/A	Apr 20, 2021
Stefan Todorović; SG	Recruit ratings: Rivals: 247Sports: (NR)				
Overall recruit ranking:
Note: In many cases, Scout, Rivals, 247Sports, On3, and ESPN may conflict in their listings of height and weight.; In these cases, the average was taken. ESPN grades are on a 100-point scale.; Sources: "SMU 2021 Basketball Commitments". Rivals.; "2021 Team Ranking". Rivals.; "2021 SMU Mustangs Basketball 24/7 Sports Commits". 247Sports.

=== 2022 Recruiting class ===
College recruiting information (2022)
Name	Hometown	School	Height	Weight	Commit date
Alex Anamekwe; SF	McKinney, TX	McKinney High School	6 ft 6 in (1.98 m)	195 lb (88 kg)	Sep 23, 2021
Alex Anamekwe; SF	Recruit ratings: Rivals: 247Sports: ESPN: (NR)				
Mouhamadou Cisse; C	Senegal	Hillcrest Prep	7 ft 0 in (2.13 m)	245 lb (111 kg)	Oct 9, 2021
Mouhamadou Cisse; C	Recruit ratings: Rivals: 247Sports: ESPN: (NR)				
Overall recruit ranking:
Note: In many cases, Scout, Rivals, 247Sports, On3, and ESPN may conflict in their listings of height and weight.; In these cases, the average was taken. ESPN grades are on a 100-point scale.; Sources: "SMU 2022 Basketball Commitments". Rivals.; "2022 Team Ranking". Rivals.; "2022 SMU Mustangs Basketball 24/7 Sports Commits". 247Sports.

== Roster ==
2021–22 SMU Mustangs men's basketball team
Players
Coaches

Pos.	#	Name	Height	Weight	Year	Previous school	Hometown
G	1	Zhuric Phelps	6 ft 3 in (1.91 m)	175 lb (79 kg)	Fr	Duncanville High School	Midland, Texas
G	2	Jalen Smith	6 ft 4 in (1.93 m)	175 lb (79 kg)	Fr	Oak Ridge High School	Orlando, Florida
G	3	Kendric Davis	6 ft 0 in (1.83 m)	180 lb (82 kg)	Sr	TCU	Houston, Texas
G	4	Tyler Lundblade	6 ft 5 in (1.96 m)	185 lb (84 kg)	Fr	Greensboro Day School	Dallas, Texas
G	5	Emmanuel Bandoumel	6 ft 4 in (1.93 m)	180 lb (82 kg)	Sr	Hill College	Quebec City, Canada
G	10	Zach Nutall	6 ft 3 in (1.91 m)	185 lb (84 kg)	Sr	Sam Houston State	Bryan, Texas
F	13	Stefan Todorović (injured)	6 ft 8 in (2.03 m)	190 lb (86 kg)	Fr	Prolific Prep	Belgrade, Serbia
G	15	Darius McBride	6 ft 4 in (1.93 m)	190 lb (86 kg)	RS So	Westlake High School	Cedar Park, Texas
F	21	Jahmar Young Jr. (W)	6 ft 9 in (2.06 m)	215 lb (98 kg)	RS Jr	DeSoto High School	Oak Cliff, Texas
F	22	Isiah Jasey (injured)	6 ft 10 in (2.08 m)	250 lb (113 kg)	GS	Texas A&M	Killeen, Texas
G	23	Michael Weathers	6 ft 3 in (1.91 m)	175 lb (79 kg)	RS Sr	Texas Southern	Roeland Park, Kansas
F	25	Tristan Clark	6 ft 10 in (2.08 m)	245 lb (111 kg)	Sr	Baylor	San Antonio, Texas
F	33	Franklin Agunanne	6 ft 9 in (2.06 m)	245 lb (111 kg)	RS Jr	Loyola–Chicago	Abuja, Nigeria
F	50	Marcus Weathers	6 ft 5 in (1.96 m)	215 lb (98 kg)	GS	Duquesne	Roeland Park, Kansas

Head coach

- Tim Jankovich (Kansas State)

Assistant coach(es)

- Jay Duncan (Northwood)
- Yaphett King (Cal State Fullerton)
- John Cooper (Wichita State)

Legend

- (C) Team captain
- (S) Suspended
- (I) Ineligible
- (W) Walk-on
- Injured
- Current redshirt

Roster

== Schedule and results ==
Date time, TV	Rank^{#}	Opponent^{#}	Result	Record	High points	High rebounds	High assists	Site (attendance) city, state
Non-conference regular season
November 9, 2021*; 7:00 p.m., ESPN+		McNeese State	W 86–62	1–0	18 – Davis	8 – Tie	5 – Davis	Moody Coliseum (3,259); University Park, TX
November 12, 2021*; 10:00 p.m., P12N		at No. 13 Oregon	L 63–86	1–1	14 – Bandoumel	5 – Tied	5 – Davis	Matthew Knight Arena (8,164); Eugene, OR
November 15, 2021*; 7:00 p.m., ESPN+		Northwestern State	W 95–48	2–1	22 – Ma. Weathers	11 – Ma. Weathers	10 – Davis	Moody Coliseum (3,184); University Park, TX
November 18, 2021*; 7:00 p.m., ESPN+		Southeastern Louisiana	W 78–61	3–1	25 – Davis	12 – Ma. Weathers	4 – Davis	Moody Coliseum (3,020); University Park, TX
November 21, 2021*; 7:00 p.m., CBSSN		vs. Missouri; Jacksonville Classic semifinals	L 75–80 ^{OT}	3–2	29 – Davis	5 – Tied	3 – Tied	UNF Arena; Jacksonville, FL
November 22, 2021*; 5:00 p.m., CBSSN		vs. Loyola Marymount; Jacksonville Classic Consolation	L 70–76	3–3	17 – Davis	6 – Tied	5 – Davis	UNF Arena (1,100); Jacksonville, FL
November 24, 2021*; 7:00 p.m., ESPN+		Sam Houston State; Jacksonville Classic campus game	W 75–66	4–3	21 – Davis	8 – Ma. Weathers	4 – Tied	Moody Coliseum (3,198); University Park, TX
November 28, 2021*; 2:00 p.m., ESPN+		Louisiana–Monroe	W 74–67	5–3	26 – Davis	7 – Davis	7 – Davis	Moody Coliseum (2,931); University Park, TX
December 1, 2021*; 7:00 p.m., ESPN+		UNLV	W 83–64	6–3	18 – Davis	9 – Mi. Weathers	8 – Davis	Moody Coliseum (3,399); University Park, TX
December 4, 2021*; 8:00 p.m., ESPN+		Vanderbilt; American/SEC Alliance	W 84–72	7–3	21 – Davis	7 – Ma. Weathers	5 – Davis	Moody Coliseum (3,835); University Park, TX
December 8, 2021*; 7:00 p.m., ESPN+		Dayton	W 77–69	8–3	19 – Davis	7 – Mi. Weathers	5 – Davis	Moody Coliseum (3,431); University Park, TX
December 19, 2021*; 1:00 p.m., Stadium		at New Mexico	W 90–72	9–3	33 – Davis	10 – Mi. Weathers	3 – Tied	The Pit (8,394); Albuquerque, NM
December 21, 2021*; 7:00 p.m., ESPN+		Evansville	Canceled due to COVID-19 issues					Moody Coliseum; University Park, TX
AAC Regular Season
December 29, 2021; 7:00 p.m., ESPN+		at Tulsa	W 74–69	10–3 (1–0)	26 – Davis	12 – Ma. Weathers	3 – Tied	Reynolds Center (2,614); Tulsa, OK
January 2, 2022; 1:00 p.m., ESPNU		UCF	W 72–60	11–3 (2–0)	20 – Davis	8 – Tied	8 – Davis	Moody Coliseum (3,267); University Park, TX
January 6, 2022; 8:30 p.m., ESPN		at Cincinnati	L 60–77	11–4 (2–1)	16 – Davis	7 – Ma. Weathers	7 – Ma. Weathers	Fifth Third Arena (7,978); Cincinnati, OH
January 12, 2022; 7:00 p.m., ESPN+		South Florida	W 77–65	12–4 (3–1)	17 – Davis	5 – Nutall	5 – Davis	Moody Coliseum (3,021); University Park, TX
January 15, 2022; 1:00 p.m., ESPN+		at Tulane	W 75–66	13–4 (4–1)	24 – Davis	10 – Ma. Weathers	4 – Davis	Devlin Fieldhouse (1,107); New Orleans, LA
January 20, 2022; 6:00 p.m., ESPN2		at Memphis	W 70–62	14–4 (5–1)	20 – Davis	8 – Mi. Weathers	4 – Phelps	FedExForum (13,723); Memphis, TN
January 26, 2022; 6:00 p.m., ESPN+		at South Florida	W 74–54	15–4 (6–1)	17 – Ma. Weathers	6 – Davis	5 – Davis	Yuengling Center (1,849); Tampa, FL
January 29, 2022; 5:00 p.m., ESPN+		Temple	W 69–61	16–4 (7–1)	27 – Ma. Weathers	9 – Ma. Weathers	4 – Davis	Moody Coliseum (3,914); University Park, TX
February 3, 2022; 6:00 p.m., ESPN+		Wichita State; Previously scheduled for Jan. 3	Postponed due to weather					Moody Coliseum; University Park, TX
February 5, 2022; 5:00 p.m., ESPN2		at Wichita State	L 57–71	16–5 (7–2)	14 – Ma. Weathers	8 – Ma. Weathers	5 – Davis	Charles Koch Arena (8,285); Wichita, KS
February 9, 2022; 6:00 p.m., ESPN2		No. 6 Houston; Rivalry	W 85–83	17–5 (8–2)	22 – Davis	7 – Tied	7 – Davis	Moody Coliseum (5,247); University Park, TX
February 12, 2022; 5:00 p.m., ESPNU		at East Carolina	W 80–66	18–5 (9–2)	23 – Bandoumel	6 – Ma. Weathers	5 – Davis	Williams Arena (3,443); Greenville, NC
February 16, 2022; 1:00 p.m., ESPNU		at Temple	L 57–64	18–6 (9–3)	22 – Mi. Weathers	10 – Ma. Weathers	4 – Mi. Weathers	Liacouras Center (4,035); Philadelphia, PA
February 20, 2022; 2:00 p.m., ESPN		Memphis	W 73–57	19–6 (10–3)	27 – Davis	10 – Mi. Weathers	5 – Mi. Weathers	Moody Coliseum (5,657); University Park, TX
February 23, 2022; 7:00 p.m., ESPN+		Tulsa	W 75–61	20–6 (11–3)	17 – Davis	13 – Ma. Weathers	7 – Davis	Moody Coliseum (3,877); University Park, TX
February 27, 2022; 11:30 a.m., ESPN		at No. 14 Houston; Rivalry	L 61–75	20–7 (11–4)	19 – Davis	4 – Tied	4 – Bandoumel	Fertitta Center (7,603); Houston, TX
March 3, 2022; 6:00 p.m., ESPNU		Cincinnati	W 76–71	21–7 (12–4)	25 – Davis	11 – Mi. Weathers	5 – Davis	Moody Coliseum (4,261); University Park, TX
March 6, 2022; 2:00 p.m., ESPN+		Tulane	W 74–68	22–7 (13–4)	19 – Davis	13 – Ma. Weathers	4 – Tied	Moody Coliseum (5,068); University Park, TX
AAC tournament
March 11, 2022; 6:00 p.m., ESPNU	(2)	vs. (10) Tulsa; Quarterfinals	W 83–58	23–7	24 – Davis	9 – Ma. Weathers	5 – Davis	Dickies Arena; Fort Worth, TX
March 12, 2022; 4:36 p.m., ESPN2	(2)	vs. (3) Memphis; Semifinals	L 63–70	23–8	16 – Ma. Weathers	6 – Ma. Weathers	2 – Tied	Dickies Arena; Fort Worth, TX
NIT
March 16, 2022; 7:00 p.m., ESPN+	(1)	Nicholls; First Round – SMU Bracket	W 68–58	24–8	16 – Tied	12 – Mi. Weathers	4 – Tied	Moody Coliseum (2,038); University Park, TX
March 20, 2022; 2:00 p.m., ESPN+	(1)	(4) Washington State; Second Round – SMU Bracket	L 63–75	24–9	30 – Davis	8 – Mi. Weathers	2 – Tied	Moody Coliseum (2,179); University Park, TX
*Non-conference game. ^{#}Rankings from AP Poll. (#) Tournament seedings in parentheses. All times are in Central Time.
