= 2022 The Basketball Classic =

American college basketball tournament

- Season: 2021–22
- Teams: 32 planned 21 bids accepted 18 teams competed
- Finals site: HTC Center, Conway, South Carolina
- Champions: Fresno State (1st title)
- Runner-up: Coastal Carolina (1st title game)
- Semifinalists: South Alabama (1st semifinal); Southern Utah (1st semifinal)
- Winning coach: Justin Hutson (1st title)
- MVP: Orlando Robinson (Fresno State)
- Attendance: 1,407 (championship game)

The 2022 The Basketball Classic (TBC) was a single-elimination men's college basketball postseason tournament featuring National Collegiate Athletic Association (NCAA) Division I teams not selected to participate in the NCAA tournament or the National Invitation Tournament (NIT). The tournament began on March 15 with the championship game played on April 1. The tournament was won by the Fresno State Bulldogs. All games were streamed on ESPN+.

== Structure ==
Tournament organizers originally announced that there would be 32 teams in the field; however, when the list of participating teams was released, only 21 were present. Three of the 21 teams subsequently withdrew prior to competing, leaving the actual field size for the tournament at 18. Due to the fluidity of the field, rather than adhering to the traditional bracket, a model previously used by the National Invitation Tournament was leveraged in which matchups were set only one round at a time. Later-round host sites were determined, at least in part, by earlier-round game attendance figures.

Five matchups in the tournament were designated as "Legend Games", honoring Zelmo Beaty, Travis Grant, Marques Haynes, Cleo Hill and Willis Reed, all of whom played college basketball at historically black colleges and universities (HBCUs). In addition to advancing in the tournament, the winning teams received a trophy honoring the legend for whom the particular game was named. Due to scheduling issues, the designated Cleo Hill game was unable to be held.

== Participating teams ==
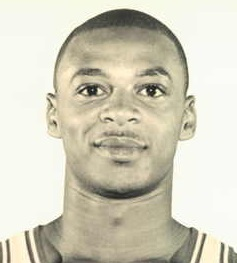
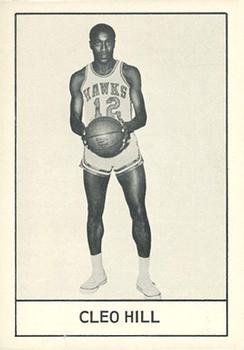
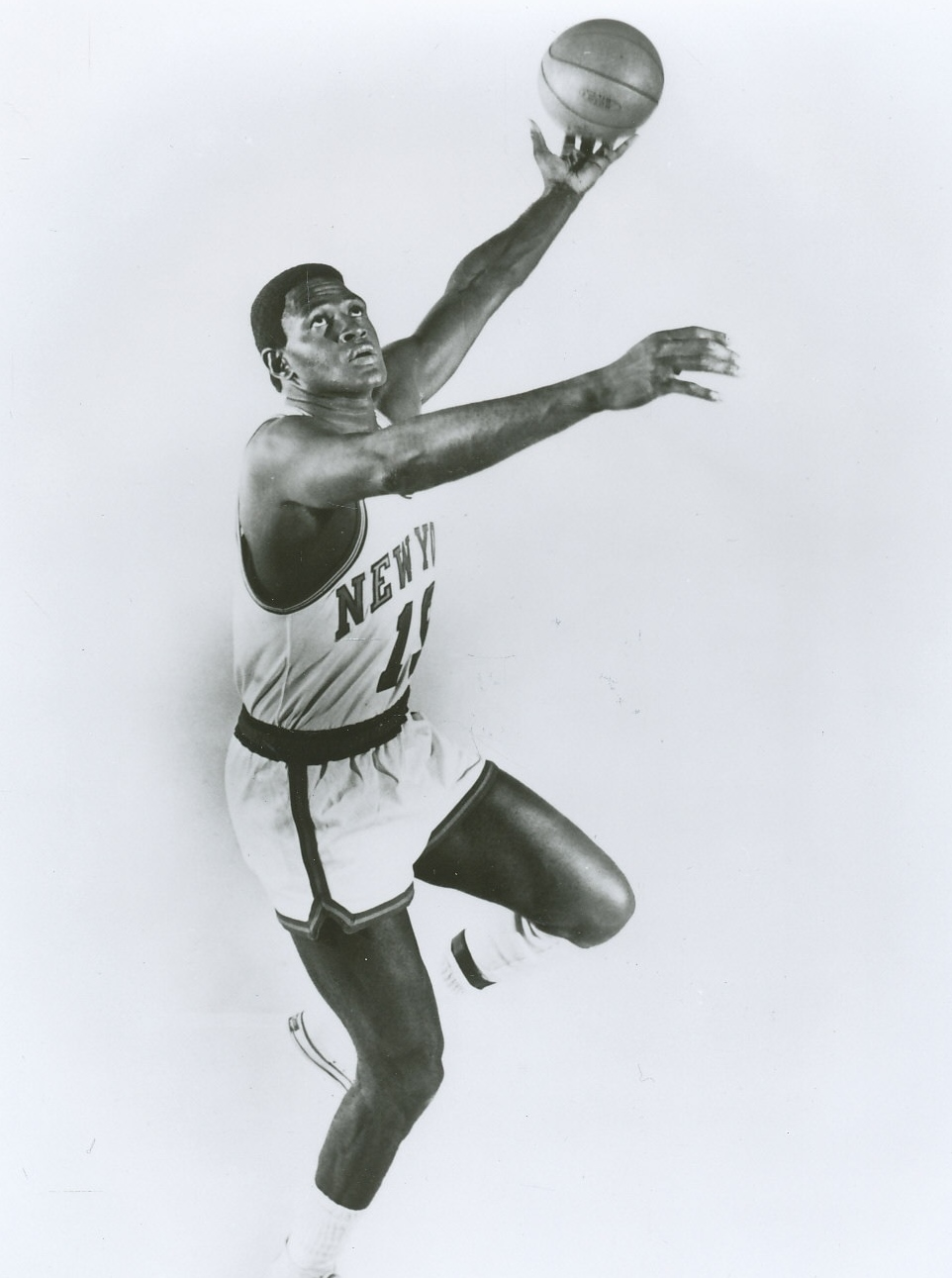
Zelmo Beaty, Cleo Hill, and Willis Reed, three Legend Game namesakes

The following eighteen teams accepted invitations to the tournament and competed. Team records are as of the end of the regular season and prior to the beginning of the tournament.

Team	Conference	Overall Record
Appalachian State	Sun Belt	19–14 (.576)
Coastal Carolina	Sun Belt	16–13 (.552)
Detroit Mercy	Horizon	14–15 (.483)
Eastern Washington	Big Sky	18–15 (.545)
Florida Gulf Coast	Atlantic Sun	21–11 (.656)
Fresno State	Mountain West	19–13 (.594)
Kent State	Mid-American	23–10 (.697)
Maryland Eastern Shore	Mid-Eastern Athletic	11–15 (.423)
Morgan State	Mid-Eastern Athletic	13–14 (.481)
New Orleans	Southland	18–13 (.581)
Portland	West Coast	18–14 (.563)
South Alabama	Sun Belt	19–11 (.633)
USC Upstate	Big South	14–16 (.467)
Southeastern Louisiana	Southland	19–14 (.576)
Southern Utah	Big Sky	20–11 (.645)
UTEP	USA	19–13 (.594)
Western Illinois	The Summit	16–15 (.516)
Youngstown State	Horizon	18–14 (.563)

The following three teams accepted invitations to the tournament, but withdrew prior to competing. Team records are as of the end of the regular season and prior to the beginning of the tournament.

Team	Conference	Overall Record
UMBC	America East	18–14 (.563)
Merrimack (Note: After Merrimack's first-round opponent (UMBC) withdrew, Merrimack no longer appeared in the schedule section of the tournament's website.)	Northeast	14–16 (.467)
Wofford	Southern	19–13 (.594)

The following seven programs declined invitations: Arkansas State, Liberty, Oakland, Sam Houston State, Samford, Utah Valley, Weber State.

== Schedule ==
Date	Time	Matchup	Score	Attendance	Reference
First Round
March 15	6:30 p.m.	USC Upstate at Appalachian State	80–74	2,146	
March 16	7:00 p.m.	Detroit Mercy at Florida Gulf Coast	79–95	505	
March 16	7:00 p.m.	Zelmo Beaty Game; Maryland Eastern Shore at Coastal Carolina	42–66	923	
March 16	8:00 p.m.	Travis Grant Game; Southeastern Louisiana at South Alabama	68–70	885	
March 16	8:00 p.m.	Marques Haynes Game; Morgan State at Youngstown State	65–70	1,045	
March 16	9:00 p.m.	Willis Reed Game; Kent State at Southern Utah	79–83	1,316	
March 17	10:00 p.m.	Eastern Washington at Fresno State	74–83	1,166	
March 19	3:00 p.m.	Western Illinois at UTEP (Note: Western Illinois at UTEP was originally scheduled for March 15, then postponed to March 19 due to travel issues for Western Illinois.)	54–80	3,500	
March 19	10:00 p.m.	New Orleans at Portland	73–94	659	
Second Round
March 21	7:00 p.m.	Florida Gulf Coast at Coastal Carolina	68–84	825	
March 21	8:00 p.m.	USC Upstate at South Alabama	79–83	699	
March 22	9:00 p.m.	Southern Utah at UTEP	82–69	3,510	
Quarterfinals
March 23	10:00 p.m.	Youngstown State at Fresno State	71–80	1,754	
March 26	6:00 p.m.	Portland at Southern Utah	66–77	1,504	
Semifinals
March 28	8:00 p.m.	Coastal Carolina at South Alabama	69–68 ^{OT}	1,039	
March 28	10:00 p.m.	Southern Utah at Fresno State	48–67	3,006	
Final
April 1	6:00 p.m.	Fresno State at Coastal Carolina	85–74	1,407	
Game times in Eastern Daylight Time (UTC−4). All games broadcast on ESPN+.

The following games were announced but never played.

Date	Time	Matchup	Score	Attendance	Reference
First Round
March 16	6:30 p.m.	Merrimack at UMBC			
Second Round
March 19	2:00 p.m.	Cleo Hill Game; Youngstown State at Wofford			
Game times in Eastern Daylight Time (UTC−4). All games broadcast on ESPN+.

== Bracket ==
The Basketball Classic field was announced after the field for the NIT was released on March 13.

With an 18-team bracket, organizers chose to match one second-round winner against Portland, with three other second-round winners advancing directly to the semifinals.

Note: Bracket is for visual purposes only. In lieu of a traditional bracket, the field and matchups were determined following the completion of the preceding round.

First Round; March 16
Kent State	79
Southern Utah	83
Western Illinois	54
UTEP	80

First/Second Round; March 15–19/March 22
New Orleans	73
Portland	94
Southern Utah	82
UTEP	69
Morgan State	65
Youngstown State	70
Eastern Washington	74
Fresno State	83
Detroit Mercy	79
Florida Gulf Coast	95
Maryland Eastern Shore	42
Coastal Carolina	66
USC Upstate	80
Appalachian State	74
Southeastern Louisiana	68
South Alabama	70

Second Round/Quarterfinals; March 21–23/March 26
Portland	66
Southern Utah	77
Youngstown State	71
Fresno State	80
Florida Gulf Coast	68
Coastal Carolina	84
USC Upstate	79
South Alabama	83

Semifinals; March 28
Southern Utah	48
Fresno State	67
Coastal Carolina	69
South Alabama	68 ^{OT}

Final; April 1
Fresno State	85
Coastal Carolina	74

Home teams listed second.

== Awards ==
The following were the most valuable players selected for each of the Legend Games:

- Zelmo Beaty Game – Rudi Williams, Coastal Carolina
- Travis Grant Game – Javon Franklin, South Alabama
- Marques Haynes Game – Dwayne Cohill, Youngstown State
- Cleo Hill Game – Canceled
- Willis Reed Game – Dre Marin, Southern Utah

== Editorials & Opinions ==
Joel Whetzel: "Disappointing, to be sure ... simply a microcosm of how this tournament has gone since conference tournaments ended. The shame is the tournament could serve a great purpose if things were to go correctly."
