= 2021–22 New Orleans Privateers men's basketball team =

American college basketball season

2021–22 New Orleans Privateers men's basketball

The Basketball Classic, first round
- Conference: Southland Conference
- Record: 18–14 (10–4 Southland)
- Head coach: Mark Slessinger (11th season)
- Assistant coaches: Jody Bailey; Kris Arkenberg; Jay Smith
- Home arena: Lakefront Arena

2021–22 Southland Conference men's basketball standings
	Conf.				Overall
Team	W		L	PCT	W		L	PCT
Nicholls	11	–	3	.786	21	–	12	.636
Southeastern Louisiana	10	–	4	.714	19	–	15	.559
New Orleans	10	–	4	.714	18	–	14	.563
Texas A&M–Corpus Christi †	7	–	7	.500	23	–	12	.657
Houston Baptist	6	–	8	.429	11	–	18	.379
Northwestern State	5	–	9	.357	9	–	23	.281
McNeese State	4	–	10	.286	11	–	22	.333
Incarnate Word	3	–	11	.214	7	–	25	.219
† 2022 Southland tournament winner

The 2021–22 New Orleans Privateers men's basketball team represented the University of New Orleans during the 2021–22 NCAA Division I men's basketball season. The Privateers were led by eleventh-year head coach Mark Slessinger and played their home games at Lakefront Arena in New Orleans, Louisiana as members of the Southland Conference.

The Privateers finished the season 18–14, 10–4 in Southland play, to finish in sixth place. In the Southland tournament, they defeated McNeese State in the second round before falling to Southeastern Louisiana in the semifinals. The Privateers were invited to the 2022 The Basketball Classic. Their season ended with a loss to Portland.

== Previous season ==
The Privateers finished the 2020–21 season 10–14, 8–7 in Southland play, to finish in sixth place. In the Southland tournament, they defeated Southeastern Louisiana in the second round before falling to Northwestern State in the quarterfinals.

== Roster ==
2021–22 New Orleans Privateers men's basketball team
Players
Coaches

Pos.	#	Name	Height	Weight	Year	Hometown
G	0	Daniel Sackey	5 ft 9 in (1.75 m)	175 lb (79 kg)	Jr	Winnipeg, Canada
G	2	Kmani Doughty	6 ft 5 in (1.96 m)	195 lb (88 kg)	RS Fr	Brooklyn, NY
G	3	Troy Green	6 ft 3 in (1.91 m)	215 lb (98 kg)	Sr	St. Rose, LA
F	4	Jahmel Myers	6 ft 6 in (1.98 m)	215 lb (98 kg)	Jr	Cape Coral, FL
F	5	Tyson Jackson	6 ft 9 in (2.06 m)	245 lb (111 kg)	So	Fairburn, GA
G	10	Derek St. Hilaire	6 ft 0 in (1.83 m)	180 lb (82 kg)	GS	Atlanta, GA
F	11	Simeon Kirkland	6 ft 10 in (2.08 m)	225 lb (102 kg)	Jr	Ocala, FL
G	12	Norris Williams	6 ft 2 in (1.88 m)	165 lb (75 kg)	Fr	New Orleans, LA
G	13	Jamond Vincent	6 ft 4 in (1.93 m)	215 lb (98 kg)	Fr	New Orleans, LA
F	22	Darrius Washington	6 ft 8 in (2.03 m)	230 lb (104 kg)	Fr	Louisville, KY
G	24	Rodney Jr. Carson	6 ft 3 in (1.91 m)	180 lb (82 kg)	So	Philadelphia, PA
G	32	Dorian Hill	6 ft 2 in (1.88 m)	165 lb (75 kg)	Fr	Hampton, VA
F	33	D'Ante Bell	6 ft 9 in (2.06 m)	225 lb (102 kg)	Fr	Shreveport, LA
G	34	De'Sean Allen-Eikens	6 ft 6 in (1.98 m)	215 lb (98 kg)	So	Williston, ND

Head coach

- Mark Slessinger (Aurora)

Assistant coach(es)

- Jody Bailey (Louisville)
- Kris Arkenberg (IUPUI)
- Jay Smith (LSU–Alexandria)

Legend

- (C) Team captain
- (S) Suspended
- (I) Ineligible
- (W) Walk-on
- Injured
- Current redshirt

Roster
Last update: February 1, 2022

== Schedule and results ==
Date time, TV	Rank^{#}	Opponent^{#}	Result	Record	Site (attendance) city, state
Exhibition
November 6, 2021*; 3:00 p.m., ESPN+		Loyola (NO); Homecoming	L 72–80	–	Lakefront Arena (1,862); New Orleans, LA
Non-conference regular season
November 9, 2021*; 6:30 p.m., SECN+/ESPN+		at Ole Miss	L 61–82	0–1	SJB Pavilion; Oxford, MS
November 13, 2021*; 3:00 p.m., ESPN+		Spring Hill	W 79–41	1–1	Lakefront Arena (1,027); New Orleans, LA
November 16, 2021*; 7:00 p.m., BTN+		at Northwestern	L 67–83	1–2	Welsh–Ryan Arena (2,593); Evanston, IL
November 19, 2021*; 7:00 p.m., ESPN+		Rice	L 78–83	1–3	Lakefront Arena (959); New Orleans, LA
November 24, 2021*; 1:00 p.m., ESPN+		Central Arkansas; UNO Classic	W 90–63	2–3	Lakefront Arena (994); New Orleans, LA
November 25, 2021*; 1:00 p.m., ESPN+		Presbyterian; UNO Classic	L 66–68	2–4	Lakefront Arena (927); New Orleans, LA
November 26, 2021*; 1:00 p.m., ESPN+		VMI; UNO Classic	W 79–71	3–4	Lakefront Arena (856); New Orleans, LA
November 30, 2021*; 6:00 p.m., SECN+		at Texas A&M	L 65–85	3–5	Reed Arena (4,958); College Station, TX
December 3, 2021*; 7:00 p.m., ESPN+		at Louisiana	L 67–80	3–6	Cajundome (2,826); Lafayette, LA
December 11, 2021*; 8:00 p.m.		at Utah State	L 50–82	3–7	Smith Spectrum (8,727); Logan, UT
December 17, 2021*; 7:00 p.m., ESPN+		Dillard	Postponed due to COVID-19		Lakefront Arena; New Orleans, LA
December 21, 2021*; 7:00 p.m., ESPN+		at Tulane	Canceled due to COVID-19		Devlin Fieldhouse; New Orleans, LA
December 28, 2021*; 5:30 p.m., BTN		at No. 13 Ohio State	Canceled due to COVID-19		Value City Arena; Columbus, OH
December 31, 2021*; 1:00 p.m., ESPN+		Belhaven	W 94–54	4–7	Lakefront Arena (905); New Orleans, LA
January 6, 2022*; 1:30 p.m., ESPN+		vs. McNeese State; Southland Basketball Tip-Off first round	L 82–92 ^{2OT}	4–8	Merrell Center; Katy, TX
January 7, 2022*; 11:00 a.m., ESPN+		vs. Houston Baptist; Southland Basketball Tip-Off consolation 2nd round	W 81–65	5–8	Merrell Center; Katy, TX
January 8, 2022*; 1:30 p.m., ESPN+		vs. Northwestern State; Southland Basketball Tip-Off 5th-place game	W 80–79	6–8	Merrell Center (101); Katy, TX
January 11, 2022*; 7:00 p.m., ESPN+		Dillard; Rescheduled from December 17	W 93–66	7–8	Lakefront Arena (835); New Orleans, LA
Southland regular season
January 15, 2022; 4:00 p.m., ESPN+		Nicholls	W 78–66	8–8 (1–0)	Lakefront Arena (1,102); New Orleans, LA
January 20, 2022; 7:00 p.m., ESPN+		Southeastern Louisiana	W 78–72	9–8 (2–0)	Lakefront Arena (921); New Orleans, LA
January 22, 2022; 4:00 p.m., ESPN+		Northwestern State	W 85–77	10–8 (3–0)	Lakefront Arena (921); New Orleans, LA
January 27, 2022; 7:00 p.m., ESPN+		at Houston Baptist	W 77–66	11–8 (4–0)	Sharp Gym (742); Houston, TX
January 30, 2022; 5:00 p.m., ESPNU		at McNeese State	W 84–78	12–8 (5–0)	The Legacy Center (1,712); Lake Charles, LA
February 3, 2022; 7:30 p.m., ESPN+		at Texas A&M–Corpus Christi	W 79–70	13–8 (6–0)	Dugan Wellness Center (1,348); Corpus Christi, TX
February 5, 2022; 4:00 p.m., ESPN+		at Incarnate Word	L 70–78	13–9 (6–1)	McDermott Center (273); San Antonio, TX
February 10, 2022; 7:00 p.m., ESPN+		Texas A&M–Corpus Christi	W 78–69	14–9 (7–1)	Lakefront Arena (1,179); New Orleans, LA
February 12, 2022; 4:00 p.m., ESPN+		Incarnate Word	W 84–57	15–9 (8–1)	Lakefront Arena (1,127); New Orleans, LA
February 19, 2022; 4:00 p.m., ESPN+		McNeese State	W 88–75	16–9 (9–1)	Lakefront Arena (1,245); New Orleans, LA
February 24, 2022; 8:00 p.m., ESPN+		at Southeastern Louisiana	L 79–84	16–10 (9–2)	University Center (621); Hammond, LA
February 26, 2022; 3:00 p.m.		at Northwestern State	L 77–87	16–11 (9–3)	Prather Coliseum (648); Natchitoches, LA
March 2, 2022; 7:00 p.m., ESPN+		Houston Baptist	W 75–74	17–11 (10–3)	Lakefront Arena (1,002); New Orleans, LA
March 5, 2022; 3:00 p.m.		at Nicholls	L 85–92	17–12 (10–4)	Stopher Gym (1,355); Thibodaux, LA
Southland tournament
March 10, 2022; 7:30 p.m., ESPN+	(3)	vs. (7) McNeese State; Second round	W 82–78	18–12	Merrell Center; Katy, TX
March 11, 2022; 7:30 p.m., ESPN+	(3)	vs. (2) Southeastern Louisiana; Semifinals	L 65–74	18–13	Merrell Center; Katy, TX
The Basketball Classic
March 19, 2022*; 9:00 p.m., ESPN+		at Portland; First round	L 73–94	18–14	Chiles Center (659); Portland, OR
*Non-conference game. ^{#}Rankings from AP poll. (#) Tournament seedings in parentheses. All times are in Central.
