= 2021–22 Northwestern State Demons basketball team =

American college basketball season

2021–22 Northwestern State Demons men's basketball
- Conference: Southland Conference
- Record: 9–23 (5–9 Southland)
- Head coach: Mike McConathy (23rd season)
- Associate head coach: Jeff Moore
- Assistant coaches: Dave Simmons; Blake Cochran
- Home arena: Prather Coliseum

2021–22 Southland Conference men's basketball standings
	Conf.				Overall
Team	W		L	PCT	W		L	PCT
Nicholls	11	–	3	.786	21	–	12	.636
Southeastern Louisiana	10	–	4	.714	19	–	15	.559
New Orleans	10	–	4	.714	18	–	14	.563
Texas A&M–Corpus Christi †	7	–	7	.500	23	–	12	.657
Houston Baptist	6	–	8	.429	11	–	18	.379
Northwestern State	5	–	9	.357	9	–	23	.281
McNeese State	4	–	10	.286	11	–	22	.333
Incarnate Word	3	–	11	.214	7	–	25	.219
† 2022 Southland tournament winner

The 2021–22 Northwestern State Demons basketball team represented Northwestern State University in the 2021–22 NCAA Division I men's basketball season. The Demons, led by 23rd-year head coach Mike McConathy, played their home games at Prather Coliseum in Natchitoches, Louisiana as members of the Southland Conference. They finished the season 9–23, 5–9 in Southland play to finish sixth place. They lost in the first round of the Southland tournament to McNeese State.

After the season, head coach Mike McConathy announced his retirement. On March 23, 2022, the school named former Missouri State assistant Corey Gipson the team's new head coach.

== Previous season ==
In a season limited due to the ongoing COVID-19 pandemic, the Demons finished the 2020–21 season 11–18, 9–7 in Southland play to finish in fifth place. They defeated New Orleans in the quarterfinals of the Southland tournament, before falling to New Orleans in the semifinals.

== Roster ==
2021–22 Northwestern State Demons men's basketball team
Players
Coaches

Pos.	#	Name	Height	Weight	Year	Hometown
G	0	Brian White	5 ft 6 in (1.68 m)	160 lb (73 kg)	Jr	Natchitoches, LA
G	2	Emareyon McDonald	6 ft 2 in (1.88 m)	165 lb (75 kg)	Fr	Coushatta, LA
G	3	LaTerrance Reed	6 ft 1 in (1.85 m)	190 lb (86 kg)	Sr	Buffalo, NY
C	4	Kendal Coleman	6 ft 8 in (2.03 m)	220 lb (100 kg)	Fr	Shreveport, LA
G	10	Jalen King	6 ft 5 in (1.96 m)	180 lb (82 kg)	So	Columbus, GA
F	11	Shaun Riley II	6 ft 6 in (1.98 m)	195 lb (88 kg)	Fr	O'Fallon, IL
G	12	Carvell Teasett	6 ft 1 in (1.85 m)	180 lb (82 kg)	Fr	Baton Rouge, LA
G	13	Jordan Potts	6 ft 3 in (1.91 m)	180 lb (82 kg)	Jr	Bothell, WA
G	15	Jovan Zelenbaba	6 ft 4 in (1.93 m)	200 lb (91 kg)	So	Kfar Blum, Israel
G/F	22	Cedric Garrett	6 ft 5 in (1.96 m)	205 lb (93 kg)	So	Houston, TX
G	30	Jackson Waggoner	6 ft 2 in (1.88 m)	170 lb (77 kg)	Fr	Colleyville, TX
C	32	Larry Owens	6 ft 8 in (2.03 m)	275 lb (125 kg)	Sr	Monroe, LA
F/C	33	Stavros Polatoglou	6 ft 11 in (2.11 m)	220 lb (100 kg)	Fr	Athens, Greece
F	34	Robert Chougkaz	6 ft 9 in (2.06 m)	195 lb (88 kg)	So	Athens, Greece
F	35	Zurabi Zhgenti	6 ft 9 in (2.06 m)	225 lb (102 kg)	So	Tbilisi, Georgia
G	44	Cooper Smith	6 ft 4 in (1.93 m)	—	Fr	Hornbeck, LA

Head coach

- Mike McConathy (Louisiana Tech)

Assistant coach(es)

- Jeff Moore (Missouri Valley)
- Dave Simmons (Louisiana Tech)
- Blake Cochran (McMurry)

Legend

- (C) Team captain
- (S) Suspended
- (I) Ineligible
- (W) Walk-on
- Injured
- Current redshirt

Roster
Last update: November 21, 2021

== Schedule and results ==
Date time, TV	Rank^{#}	Opponent^{#}	Result	Record	Site (attendance) city, state
Non-conference regular season
November 9, 2021*; 7:00 pm, BSOK		at Oklahoma	L 59–77	0–1	Lloyd Noble Center (6,022); Norman, OK
November 10, 2021*; 7:00 pm, ESPN+		at Tulsa	L 75–82	0–2	Reynolds Center (2,461); Tulsa, OK
November 13, 2021*; 7:30 pm		Champion Christian	W 91–62	1–2	Prather Coliseum (508); Natchitoches, LA
November 15, 2021*; 7:00 pm, ESPN+		at SMU	L 48–95	1–3	Moody Coliseum (3,184); University Park, TX
November 19, 2021*; 7:30 pm		Louisiana Tech; Lanky Wells Memorial Classic	L 64–83	1–4	Prather Coliseum (1,378); Natchitoches, LA
November 22, 2021*; 2:00 pm		vs. Louisiana–Monroe; Lanky Wells Memorial Classic	L 66–96	1–5	Thomas Assembly Center (112); Ruston, LA
November 28, 2021*; 3:00 pm		Stephen F. Austin	L 68–72	1–6	Prather Coliseum (1,005); Natchitoches, LA
November 30, 2021*; 7:00 pm, ESPN+		at No. 15 Houston	L 58–99	1–7	Fertitta Center (6,639); Houston, TX
December 4, 2021*; 2:00 pm, ESPN+		at Louisiana–Monroe	L 71–84	1–8	Fant–Ewing Coliseum (1,321); Monroe, LA
December 11, 2021*; 3:00 pm		Dallas Christian	W 89–67	2–8	Prather Coliseum (835); Natchitoches, LA
December 14, 2021*; 6:00 pm, SECN		at No. 19 LSU	L 49–89	2–9	Pete Maravich Assembly Center (8,904); Baton Rouge, LA
December 18, 2021*; 6:00 pm		Southwestern Adventist	W 104–50	3–9	Prather Coliseum (348); Natchitoches, LA
December 21, 2021*; 5:00 pm, SECN+/ESPN+		at Texas A&M	L 61–80	3–10	Reed Arena (5,440); College Station, TX
December 28, 2021*; 7:00 pm, Big 12 Now		at No. 1 Baylor	L 68–104	3–11	Ferrell Center (6,516); Waco, TX
January 6, 2022*; 5:00 pm, ESPN+		vs. Texas A&M–Corpus Christi; Southland Basketball Tip-Off First Round	L 67–89	3–12	Merrell Center (87); Katy, TX
January 7, 2022*; 1:30 pm, ESPN+		vs. Nicholls; Southland Basketball Tip-Off Consolation 2nd Round	W 83–80	4–11	Merrell Center; Katy, TX
January 8, 2022*; 1:30 pm, ESPN+		vs. New Orleans; Southland Basketball Tip-Off 5th Place Game	L 79–80	4–13	Merrell Center (101); Katy, TX
Southland regular season
January 15, 2022; 4:00 pm, ESPN+		at Southeastern Louisiana	L 74–79	4–14 (0–1)	University Center (375); Hammond, LA
January 20, 2022; 7:00 pm		at Nicholls	L 58–69	4–15 (0–2)	Stopher Gymnasium (325); Thibodaux, LA
January 22, 2022; 4:00 pm, ESPN+		at New Orleans	L 77–85	4–16 (0–3)	Lakefront Arena (921); New Orleans, LA
January 27, 2022; 7:30 pm		Incarnate Word	W 79–70	5–16 (1–3)	Prather Coliseum (1,022); Natchitoches, LA
January 29, 2022; 3:00 pm		Texas A&M–Corpus Christi	W 90–76	6–16 (2–3)	Prather Coliseum (1,005); Natchitoches, LA
February 3, 2022; 7:00 pm, ESPN+		at Houston Baptist	W 97–87	7–16 (3–3)	Sharp Gymnasium (462); Houston, TX
February 5, 2022; 3:00 pm		at McNeese State	L 84–93	7–17 (3–4)	The Legacy Center (2,115); Lake Charles, LA
February 10, 2022; 7:30 pm		Houston Baptist	L 69–76	7–18 (3–5)	Prather Coliseum (1,202); Natchitoches, LA
February 12, 2022; 3:00 pm, ESPN+		McNeese State	L 75–80	7–19 (3–6)	Prather Coliseum (738); Natchitoches, LA
February 17, 2022; 7:30 pm		at Incarnate Word	W 88–64	8–19 (4–6)	McDermott Center (267); San Antonio, TX
February 19, 2022; 3:30 pm, ESPN+		at Texas A&M–Corpus Christi	L 76–83	8–20 (4–7)	American Bank Center (2,301); Corpus Christi, TX
February 24, 2022; 7:30 pm		Nicholls	L 62–80	8–21 (4–8)	Prather Coliseum (772); Natchitoches, LA
February 26, 2022; 3:00 pm		New Orleans	W 87–77	9–21 (5–8)	Prather Coliseum (648); Natchitoches, LA
March 5, 2022; 3:00 pm		Southeastern Louisiana	L 80–85	9–22 (5–9)	Prather Coliseum (654); Natchitoches, LA
Southland tournament
March 9, 2022; 7:30 pm, ESPN+	(6)	vs. (7) McNeese State; First round	L 67–80	9–23	Merrell Center; Katy, TX
*Non-conference game. ^{#}Rankings from AP Poll. (#) Tournament seedings in parentheses. All times are in Central.
