= 2022 Southland Conference men's basketball tournament =

Postseason men's basketball tournament

- Classification: Division I
- Season: 2021–22
- Teams: 8
- Site: Merrell Center; Katy, Texas
- Champions: Texas A&M–Corpus Christi (2nd title)
- Winning coach: Steve Lutz (1st title)
- MVP: Terrion Murdix (Texas A&M–Corpus Christi)
- Attendance: 1,252 (championship)
- Television: ESPN+, ESPN2

2021–22 Southland Conference men's basketball standings
	Conf.				Overall
Team	W		L	PCT	W		L	PCT
Nicholls	11	–	3	.786	21	–	12	.636
Southeastern Louisiana	10	–	4	.714	19	–	15	.559
New Orleans	10	–	4	.714	18	–	14	.563
Texas A&M–Corpus Christi †	7	–	7	.500	23	–	12	.657
Houston Baptist	6	–	8	.429	11	–	18	.379
Northwestern State	5	–	9	.357	9	–	23	.281
McNeese State	4	–	10	.286	11	–	22	.333
Incarnate Word	3	–	11	.214	7	–	25	.219
† 2022 Southland tournament winner

The 2022 Southland Conference men's basketball tournament was the postseason men's basketball tournament for the 2021–22 season in the Southland Conference. The tournament was held March 9–12, 2022, at the Merrell Center in Katy, Texas. The tournament winner, the Texas A&M–Corpus Christi Islanders, received the conference's automatic invitation to the 2022 NCAA Division I men's basketball tournament.

== Seeds ==
Teams will be seeded by record within the conference, with a tie–breaker system to seed teams with identical conference records. All eight teams in the conference qualify for the tournament. The top two seeds received double byes into the semifinals in the merit-based format. The No. 3 and No. 4 seeds received single byes to the quarterfinals. Tiebreakers used are 1) Head-to-head results, 2) comparison of records against individual teams in the conference starting with the top-ranked team(s) and working down and 3) NCAA NET rankings available on day following the conclusion of regular-season play.

Seed	School	Conference	Tiebreaker 1	Tiebreaker 2
1	Nicholls	11–3		
2	Southeastern Louisiana	10–4	1–1 vs New Orleans	2–0 vs Nicholls
3	New Orleans	10–4	1–1 vs Southeastern Louisiana	1–1 vs Nicholls
4	Texas A&M-Corpus Christi	7–7		
5	Houston Baptist	6–8		
6	Northwestern State	5–9		
7	McNeese State	4–10		
8	Incarnate Word	3–11		

== Schedule ==
Session	Game	Time*	Matchup^{#}	Score	Television	Attendance
First round – Wednesday, March 9, 2022
1	1	5:00 pm	No. 5 Houston Baptist vs. No. 8 Incarnate Word	74–64	ESPN+	650
1	2	7:30 pm	No. 6 Northwestern State vs. No. 7 McNeese State	67–80	ESPN+	650
Second round – Thursday, March 10, 2022
2	3	5:00 pm	No. 4 Texas A&M-CC vs. No. 5 Houston Baptist	75–60	ESPN+	
2	4	7:30 pm	No. 3 New Orleans vs. No. 7 McNeese State	82–78	ESPN+	
Semifinals – Friday, March 11, 2022
3	5	5:00 pm	No. 1 Nicholls vs. No. 4 Texas A&M-CC	64–71	ESPN+	
3	6	7:30 pm	No. 2 Southeastern Louisiana vs. No. 3 New Orleans	74–65	ESPN+	
Championship – Saturday, March 12, 2022
4	7	8:30 pm	No. 4 Texas A&M-CC vs. No. 2 Southeastern Louisiana	73–65	ESPN2	1,252
*Game times in CDT. #-Rankings denote tournament seeding.

== Bracket ==
First round Wednesday, March 9 ESPN+
5	Houston Baptist	74
8	Incarnate Word	64
6	Northwestern State	67
7	McNeese State	80

Second round Thursday, March 10; ESPN+
4	Texas A&M-CC	75
5	Houston Baptist	60
3	New Orleans	82
7	McNeese State	78

Semifinals; Friday, March 11; ESPN+
1	Nicholls	64
4	Texas A&M-CC	71
2	Southeastern Louisiana	74
3	New Orleans	65

Championship; Saturday, March 12; ESPN2
4	Texas A&M-CC	73
2	Southeastern Louisiana	65

* denotes number of overtime periods
