= 2021–22 Texas A&M–Corpus Christi Islanders men's basketball team =

American college basketball season

2021–22 Texas A&M–Corpus Christi Islanders men's basketball

Southland tournament champions

NCAA tournament, First Four
- Conference: Southland Conference
- Record: 23–12 (7–7 Southland)
- Head coach: Steve Lutz (1st season)
- Associate head coach: Ralph Davis
- Assistant coaches: Cole Dewey; Jim Shaw
- Home arena: American Bank Center; Dugan Wellness Center

2021–22 Southland Conference men's basketball standings
	Conf.				Overall
Team	W		L	PCT	W		L	PCT
Nicholls	11	–	3	.786	21	–	12	.636
Southeastern Louisiana	10	–	4	.714	19	–	15	.559
New Orleans	10	–	4	.714	18	–	14	.563
Texas A&M–Corpus Christi †	7	–	7	.500	23	–	12	.657
Houston Baptist	6	–	8	.429	11	–	18	.379
Northwestern State	5	–	9	.357	9	–	23	.281
McNeese State	4	–	10	.286	11	–	22	.333
Incarnate Word	3	–	11	.214	7	–	25	.219
† 2022 Southland tournament winner

The 2021–22 Texas A&M–Corpus Christi Islanders men's basketball team represented Texas A&M University–Corpus Christi in the 2021–22 NCAA Division I men's basketball season. The Islanders, led by first-year head coach Steve Lutz, competed as members of the Southland Conference. With the exception of four games at the on-campus Dugan Wellness Center, they played most of their home games at American Bank Center. Both venues are in Corpus Christi, Texas. They finished the season 23–12, 7–7 in Southland play to finish in fourth place. As the No. 4 seed, they defeated Houston Baptist, Nicholls, and Southeastern Louisiana to win the Southland tournament. They received the conference’s automatic bid to the NCAA tournament as a No. 16 seed in the Midwest Region, where they lost in the First Four to Texas Southern.

== Previous season ==
The Islanders finished the 2020–21 season 5–19, 2–13 in Southland play to finish in last place. Since only the top 10 teams in the conference qualify for the Southland tournament, the Islanders failed to qualify.

== Roster ==
2021–22 Texas A&M–Corpus Christi Islanders men's basketball team
Players
Coaches

Pos.	#	Name	Height	Weight	Year	Hometown
G	0	Trevian Tennyson	6 ft 4 in (1.93 m)	180 lb (82 kg)	Jr	Arlington, TX
F/C	1	Jasman Sangha	6 ft 8 in (2.03 m)	225 lb (102 kg)	Jr	Brampton, ON
G	2	Myles Smith	6 ft 0 in (1.83 m)	190 lb (86 kg)	GS	Klein, TX
G	3	Tyrese Nickelson	6 ft 2 in (1.88 m)	170 lb (77 kg)	Jr	Waterloo, IA
G	4	Jalen Jackson	5 ft 11 in (1.8 m)	180 lb (82 kg)	Jr	San Antonio, TX
G	5	Jordan Roberts	6 ft 4 in (1.93 m)	170 lb (77 kg)	Fr	Grand Prairie, TX
F	10	Isaac Mushila	6 ft 5 in (1.96 m)	208 lb (94 kg)	Jr	Lubumbashi, Congo
G	11	Terrion Murdix	6 ft 1 in (1.85 m)	170 lb (77 kg)	Jr	Springfield, IL
F	12	Owen Dease	6 ft 8 in (2.03 m)	180 lb (82 kg)	Fr	Evansville, IN
F	13	De'Lazarus Keys	6 ft 8 in (2.03 m)	230 lb (104 kg)	Sr	Orlando, FL
G	14	Donovan Ray	6 ft 4 in (1.93 m)	175 lb (79 kg)	Jr	Fresno, TX
G	21	Ethan White	6 ft 3 in (1.91 m)	185 lb (84 kg)	GS	San Antonio, TX
G	22	Simeon Fryer	6 ft 5 in (1.96 m)	185 lb (84 kg)	Sr	Philadelphia, PA
F	23	San Antonio Brinson	6 ft 8 in (2.03 m)	220 lb (100 kg)	GS	Thomson, GA
C	32	Stephen Faramade	6 ft 9 in (2.06 m)	220 lb (100 kg)	So	Houston, TX

Head coach

- Steve Lutz (Texas Lutheran)

Assistant coach(es)

- Ralph Davis (Texas A&M–Kingsville)
- Cole Dewey (Campbell)
- Jim Shaw (Grinnell)

Legend

- (C) Team captain
- (S) Suspended
- (I) Ineligible
- (W) Walk-on
- Injured
- Current redshirt

Roster
Last update: February 2, 2022

== Schedule and results ==
Date time, TV	Rank^{#}	Opponent^{#}	Result	Record	Site (attendance) city, state
Non-conference Regular season
November 9, 2021*; 7:00 pm, KDF		Texas Lutheran	W 102–64	1–0	American Bank Center (1,289); Corpus Christi, TX
November 14, 2021*; 2:00 pm, SECN+/ESPN+		at Texas A&M	L 65–86	1–1	Reed Arena (4,696); College Station, TX
November 16, 2021*; 5:00 pm		vs. IUPUI; UTSA Tournament	W 65–59	2–1	Convocation Center (148); San Antonio, TX
November 17, 2021*; 1:00 pm		vs. Denver; UTSA Tournament	W 69–67	3–1	Convocation Center (124); San Antonio, TX
November 21, 2021*; 3:00 pm		at UTSA; UTSA Tournament	W 77–58	4–1	Convocation Center (1,065); San Antonio, TX
November 27, 2021*; 2:00 pm		St. Mary's (TX)	W 83–78	5–1	Dugan Wellness Center (688); Corpus Christi, TX
December 1, 2021*; 7:30 pm, ESPN+		at Texas–Rio Grande Valley; South Texas Showdown	W 83–77	6–1	UTRGV Fieldhouse (2,500); Edinburg, TX
December 4, 2021*; 2:00 pm		Southwestern	W 111–60	7–1	American Bank Center (841); Corpus Christi, TX
December 8, 2021*; 7:00 pm, ESPN+		Texas–Rio Grande Valley; South Texas Showdown	W 75–69	8–1	American Bank Center (1,349); Corpus Christi, TX
December 11, 2021*; 7:00 pm		at Omaha	W 87–73	9–1	Baxter Arena (1,058); Omaha, NE
December 14, 2021*; 7:00 pm, BTN		at Minnesota	L 71–79	9–2	Williams Arena (9,001); Minneapolis, MN
December 18, 2021*; 12:00 pm, ESPN+		Lamar	W 57–53	10–2	Dugan Wellness Center (816); Corpus Christi, TX
December 22, 2021*; 12:00 pm, ACCN/ESPN+		at Notre Dame	L 73–83	10–3	Edmund P. Joyce Center (5,970); Notre Dame, IN
December 31, 2021*; 12:00 pm		Sul Ross State	W 101–49	11–3	Dugan Wellness Center (689); Corpus Christi, TX
January 6, 2022*; 5:00 pm, ESPN+		vs. Northwestern State; Southland Basketball Tip-Off First Round	W 89–67	12–3	Merrell Center (87); Katy, TX
January 7, 2022*; 7:30 pm, ESPN+		vs. Nicholls; Southland Basketball Tip-Off Semifinals	L 75–84	12–4	Merrell Center; Katy, TX
January 8, 2022*; 5:00 pm, ESPN+		vs. McNeese State; Southland Basketball Tip-Off 3rd Place Game	W 67–54	13–4	Merrell Center; Katy, TX
Southland Conference season
January 15, 2022; 3:30 pm, ESPN+		Incarnate Word	W 80–64	14–4 (1–0)	American Bank Center (1,007); Corpus Christi, TX
January 20, 2022; 7:30 pm, ESPN+		McNeese State	W 60–56	15–4 (2–0)	American Bank Center (1,023); Corpus Christi, TX
January 22, 2022; 3:30 pm, ESPN+		Houston Baptist	L 71–77	15–5 (2–1)	American Bank Center (1,343); Corpus Christi, TX
January 27, 2022; 8:00 pm, ESPN+		at Southeastern Louisiana	W 86–71	16–5 (3–1)	University Center (670); Hammond, LA
January 29, 2022; 3:00 pm		at Northwestern State	L 76–90	16–6 (3–2)	Prather Coliseum (1,005); Natchitoches, LA
February 3, 2022; 7:30 pm, ESPN+		New Orleans	L 70–79	16–7 (3–3)	Dugan Wellness Center (1,348); Corpus Christi, TX
February 10, 2022; 7:00 pm, ESPN+		at New Orleans	L 69–78	16–8 (3–4)	Lakefront Arena (1,179); New Orleans, LA
February 12, 2022; 3:00 pm		at Nicholls	L 80–83 ^{OT}	16–9 (3–5)	Stopher Gymnasium (332); Thibodaux, LA
February 17, 2022; 7:30 pm, ESPN+		Southeastern Louisiana	L 74–83	16–10 (3–6)	American Bank Center (1,458); Corpus Christi, TX
February 19, 2022; 5:00 pm, ESPN+		Northwestern State; Homecoming	W 83–76	17–10 (4–6)	American Bank Center (2,301); Corpus Christi, TX
February 24, 2022; 7:00 pm		at McNeese State	W 65–53	18–10 (5–6)	The Legacy Center (1,474); Lake Charles, LA
February 26, 2022; 7:00 pm, ESPN+		at Houston Baptist	W 75–70	19–10 (6–6)	Sharp Gymnasium (694); Houston, TX
March 2, 2022; 7:30 pm, ESPN+		Nicholls	L 75–86	19–11 (6–7)	American Bank Center (1,648); Corpus Christi, TX
March 5, 2022; 4:00 pm		at Incarnate Word	W 77–68	20–11 (7–7)	McDermott Center (737); San Antonio, TX
Southland tournament
March 10, 2022; 5:00 pm, ESPN+	(4)	vs. (5) Houston Baptist; Quarterfinal	W 75–60	21–11	Merrell Center; Katy, TX
March 11, 2022; 6:00 pm, ESPN+	(4)	vs. (1) Nicholls; Semifinal	W 71–63	22–11	Merrell Center; Katy, TX
March 12, 2022; 9:30 pm, ESPN2	(4)	vs. (2) Southeastern Louisiana; Championship	W 73–65	23–11	Merrell Center (1,252); Katy, TX
NCAA tournament
March 15, 2022*; 5:40 pm, TruTV	(16 MW)	vs. (16 MW) Texas Southern; First Four	L 67–76	23–12	UD Arena (12,522); Dayton, OH
*Non-conference game. ^{#}Rankings from AP Poll. (#) Tournament seedings in parentheses. All times are in Central.
