= 2021–22 Portland Pilots men's basketball team =

American college basketball season

2021–22 Portland Pilots men's basketball

The Basketball Classic, quarterfinals
- Conference: West Coast Conference
- Record: 19–15 (7–7 WCC)
- Head coach: Shantay Legans (1st season)
- Assistant coaches: Bobby Suarez; T.J. Lipold; Jeremy Pope
- Home arena: Chiles Center

2021–22 West Coast Conference men's basketball standings
	Conf.				Overall
Team	W		L	PCT	W		L	PCT
No. 1 Gonzaga †	13	–	1	.929	28	–	4	.875
No. 18 Saint Mary's	12	–	3	.800	26	–	8	.765
Santa Clara	10	–	5	.667	21	–	12	.636
San Francisco	10	–	6	.625	24	–	10	.706
BYU	9	–	6	.600	24	–	11	.686
Portland	7	–	7	.500	19	–	15	.559
San Diego	7	–	9	.438	15	–	16	.484
Pacific	3	–	11	.214	8	–	22	.267
Loyola Marymount	3	–	12	.200	11	–	18	.379
Pepperdine	1	–	15	.063	7	–	25	.219
† 2022 WCC tournament winner Rankings from AP poll

The 2021–22 Portland Pilots men's basketball team represented the University of Portland during the 2021–22 NCAA Division I men's basketball season. The Pilots, led by first-year head coach Shantay Legans, played their home games at the Chiles Center in Portland, Oregon as members of the West Coast Conference (WCC).

The Pilots finished the season 19–15, 7–7 in WCC play, to finish in sixth place. They defeated San Diego in the second round of the WCC tournament before losing to Santa Clara in the quarterfinals. They Pilots received an invitation to The Basketball Classic where they defeated New Orleans before losing to Southern Utah in the quarterfinals.

== Previous season ==
In a season limited due to the ongoing COVID-19 pandemic, the Pilots finished the 2020–21 season 6–15, 0–11 in WCC play, to finish in last place. They lost in the first round of the WCC tournament to Santa Clara.

On February 5, 2021, head coach Terry Porter was fired after 17 games. Assistant Ben Johnson coached the team for the remainder of the season. On March 22, the school named Eastern Washington head coach Shantay Legans as the team's new head coach.

== Offseason ==
=== Departures ===
Name	Number	Pos.	Height	Weight	Year	Hometown	Reason for departure
Clythus Griffith	0	G	6' 2"	180	RS Junior	Mississauga, ON	Transferred
Zac Triplett	1	G	6' 5"	165	Freshman	Melbourne, Australia	Signed to play professionally in Australia with Melbourne United
Ahmed Ali	2	G	5' 11"	170	Senior	Toronto, ON	Graduate transferred
Isiah Dasher	3	G	6' 3"	175	Junior	Jersey City, NJ	Transferred to Saint Peter's
Quincy Ferebee	4	G	6' 1"	175	Senior	San Diego, CA	Transferred
Chase Adams	10	G	5' 7"	150	Sophomore	Chicago, IL	Transferred to Salt Lake CC
Latrell Jones	11	G	6' 5"	175	Junior	Avondale, LA	Transferred to Nicholls State
Eddie Davis	13	F	6' 6"	190	Junior	Port Salerno, FL	Transferred
Tahirou Diabate	14	F	6' 9"	225	Senior	Bamako, Mali	Graduate transferred to San Diego State
Hayden Curtiss	15	F	6' 9"	205	Freshman	North Bend, WA	Transferred to Portland State
Takiula Faheresohn	20	G	6' 7"	185	RS Junior	Auckland, New Zealand	Signed to play semi-professionally in New Zealand with Auckland Huskies
Hunter Seymour	23	F	6' 8"	215	Junior	Charlotte, NC	Transferred to Cal State Dominguez Hills
Michael Henn	24	F	6' 8"	225	Senior	Bellevue, WA	Graduate transferred to Denver

=== Incoming transfers ===
Name	Number	Pos.	Height	Weight	Year	Hometown	Previous school
Moses Wood	1	F	6' 8"	210	RS Junior	Reno, NV	UNLV
Tyler Robertson	2	G/F	6' 6"	200	Junior	Melbourne, Australia	Eastern Washington
Chris Austin	5	G	6' 4"	205	Junior	Pasadena, CA	Fordham
Jack Perry	11	G	6' 2"	175	RS Senior	Melbourne, Australia	Eastern Washington
Kristian Sjolund	12	F	6' 8"	206	RS Junior	Kongsberg, Norway	UTEP
Matheus Silveira	24	C	7' 0"	255	RS Junior	Três Pontas, Brazil	Pensacola State College
Michael Meadows	25	G	6' 2"	175	RS Junior	Hollywood, CA	Eastern Washington

=== 2021 recruiting class ===
College recruiting information
Name	Hometown	School	Height	Weight	Commit date
Yaru Harvey; PG	Sacramento, CA	Southern California Academy	6 ft 2 in (1.88 m)	170 lb (77 kg)	
Yaru Harvey; PG	Recruit ratings: No ratings found				
Skylar Wilson; SF	Castaic, CA	Southern California Academy	6 ft 7 in (2.01 m)	170 lb (77 kg)	
Skylar Wilson; SF	Recruit ratings: No ratings found				
Nikola Milošević; SG	Podgorica, Montenegro	BKK Radnički	6 ft 5 in (1.96 m)	N/A	
Nikola Milošević; SG	Recruit ratings: No ratings found				
Matija Svetozarevic; SG	Niš, Serbia	KK Dynamic	6 ft 8 in (2.03 m)	190 lb (86 kg)	
Matija Svetozarevic; SG	Recruit ratings: No ratings found				
Vasilije Vučinić; C	Bijelo Polje, Montenegro	KK Budućnost	6 ft 10 in (2.08 m)	N/A	
Vasilije Vučinić; C	Recruit ratings: No ratings found				
Overall recruit ranking: Scout: nr Rivals: nr ESPN: nr
Note: In many cases, Scout, Rivals, 247Sports, On3, and ESPN may conflict in their listings of height and weight.; In these cases, the average was taken. ESPN grades are on a 100-point scale.; Sources: "Portland Pilots 2021 Basketball Commitments". Rivals.; "2021 Portland Pilots Basketball Commits". Scout.; "ESPN 2021 Portland Pilots Basketball recruits". ESPN.; "Scout.com Team Recruiting Rankings". Scout.; "2021 Team Ranking". Rivals.

== Roster ==
2021–22 Portland Pilots men's basketball team
Players
Coaches

Pos.	#	Name	Height	Weight	Year	Previous school	Hometown
G	0	Yaru Harvey	6 ft 3 in (1.91 m)	175 lb (79 kg)	Fr	Sheldon HS	Sacramento, CA
F	1	Moses Wood	6 ft 8 in (2.03 m)	210 lb (95 kg)	RS Jr	Galena HS; Tulane/UNLV	Reno, NV
G/F	2	Tyler Robertson	6 ft 6 in (1.98 m)	200 lb (91 kg)	Jr	Box Hill Sr. Secondary; Eastern Washington	Melbourne, Australia
G	3	Skylar Wilson	6 ft 7 in (2.01 m)	185 lb (84 kg)	Fr	Eaglecrest HS	Aurora, CO
G	4	Nikola Milošević	6 ft 5 in (1.96 m)	190 lb (86 kg)	Fr	BKK Radnički	Podgorica, Montenegro
G	5	Chris Austin	6 ft 4 in (1.93 m)	205 lb (93 kg)	Jr	Maranatha HS; Fordham	Pasadena, CA
F	10	Coleman Lemke (W)	6 ft 7 in (2.01 m)	185 lb (84 kg)	Fr	Faith Lutheran HS	Las Vegas, NV
G	11	Jack Perry	6 ft 2 in (1.88 m)	180 lb (82 kg)	RS Sr	Camberwell Grammar School; Eastern Washington	Melbourne, Australia
F	12	Kristian Sjolund	6 ft 8 in (2.03 m)	206 lb (93 kg)	RS Jr	Topkins HS; Georgia Tech/UTEP	Kongsberg, Norway
G/F	13	Matija Svetozarevic	6 ft 8 in (2.03 m)	180 lb (82 kg)	Fr	KK Dynamic	Niš, Serbia
G/F	15	Chika Nduka (W)	6 ft 6 in (1.98 m)	220 lb (100 kg)	Fr	Eastside Catholic HS	Seattle, WA
G	21	Miles Turner (W)	6 ft 2 in (1.88 m)	190 lb (86 kg)	RS Jr	Tracy HS	Tracy, CA
G	22	Liam Faler (W)	5 ft 10 in (1.78 m)	180 lb (82 kg)	Fr	St. Monica Catholic HS	Santa Monica, CA
F	23	Vasilije Vučinić	6 ft 11 in (2.11 m)	220 lb (100 kg)	Fr	BKK Radnički	Bijelo Polje, Montenegro
C	24	Matheus Silveira	7 ft 0 in (2.13 m)	255 lb (116 kg)	RS So	Calusa Preparatory School; Austin Peay/Pensacola State College	Três Pontas, Brazil
G	25	Michael Meadows	6 ft 2 in (1.88 m)	175 lb (79 kg)	RS So	Campbell Hall School; Eastern Washington	Hollywood, CA
F	34	Wyatt Watson (W)	6 ft 9 in (2.06 m)	195 lb (88 kg)	RS Jr	Sehome HS	Bellingham, WA

Head coach

- Shantay Legans (Fresno State)

Assistant coach(es)

- Bobby Suarez (Florida Gulf Coast)
- T.J. Lipold (Westmont College)
- Jeremy Pope (Biola)

Legend

- (C) Team captain
- (S) Suspended
- (I) Ineligible
- (W) Walk-on
- Injured
- Current redshirt

Roster
Last update: February 17, 2024

== Schedule and results ==
The Pilots' January 8 game against Santa Clara was postponed due to COVID-19 protocols. The game was rescheduled for February 14, but Santa Clara canceled the game on February 10. The Pilots scheduled a game against the NAIA's Bushnell on February 15.

Date time, TV	Rank^{#}	Opponent^{#}	Result	Record	High points	High rebounds	High assists	Site (attendance) city, state
Exhibition
November 1, 2021*; 7:00 p.m.		Lewis & Clark College	W 93–67		20 – Austin	11 – Vucinic	7 – Robertson	Chiles Center; Portland, OR
Regular season
November 9, 2021*; 4:00 p.m., P12N		at Arizona State	L 60–76	0–1	22 – Austin	7 – tied	7 – Perry	Desert Financial Arena (6,912); Tucson, AZ
November 11, 2021*; 7:30 p.m., KRCW		Willamette	W 122–78	1–1	16 – tied	14 – Wood	11 – Meadows	Chiles Center (1,056); Portland, OR
November 13, 2021*; 5:00 p.m.		Alcorn State	W 62–58	2–1	19 – Robertson	4 – tied	4 – Meadows	Chiles Center (1,092); Portland, OR
November 18, 2021*; 7:00 p.m., KRCW		Arkansas–Pine Bluff	W 86–74	3–1	21 – Wood	9 – Robertson	6 – Robertson	Chiles Center (1,018); Portland, OR
November 20, 2021*; 7:00 p.m.		Morgan State	W 74–63	4–1	22 – Robertson	8 – tied	8 – Robertson	Chiles Center (1,122); Portland, OR
November 23, 2021*; 7:00 p.m., KRCW		at Portland State	W 69–54	5–1	15 – Austin	10 – Wood	5 – Robertson	Viking Pavilion (1,352); Portland, OR
November 26, 2021*; 12:00 p.m.		vs. Montana State; Incarnate Word Tournament	L 66–69	5–2	20 – Wood	8 – Wood	3 – Meadows	McDermott Center (170); San Antonio, TX
November 27, 2021*; 12:00 p.m.		vs. Southeast Missouri State; Incarnate Word Tournament	W 74–68	6–2	20 – Robertson	12 – Robertson	5 – Robertson	McDermott Center (100); San Antonio, TX
November 28, 2021*; 12:00 p.m.		at Incarnate Word; Incarnate Word Tournament	W 77–68	7–2	22 – Meadows	9 – Austin	4 – Meadows	McDermott Center (195); San Antonio, TX
December 3, 2021*; 7:00 p.m.		VMI	L 82–90	7–3	26 – Austin	10 – Robertson	7 – Meadows	Chiles Center (1,171); Portland, OR
December 13, 2021*; 7:00 p.m.		Cal Poly	W 78–77	8–3	20 – Sjolund	5 – Wood	7 – Robertson	Chiles Center (889); Portland, OR
December 15, 2021*; 6:00 p.m., P12N		at Oregon	L 71–96	8–4	19 – Austin	7 – tied	3 – Wood	Matthew Knight Arena (5,251); Eugene, OR
December 17, 2021*; 7:00 p.m., KRCW		San Jose State	L 78–90	8–5	16 – Meadows	6 – tied	5 – Meadows	Chiles Center (982); Portland, OR
December 19, 2021*; 12:00 p.m.		at Montana State	L 59–61	8–6	19 – Austin	12 – Austin	2 – Meadows	Brick Breeden Fieldhouse (2,234); Bozeman, MT
December 22, 2021*; 2:00 p.m., ESPN+		at UC Davis	W 65–60	9–6	18 – Wood	6 – tied	6 – Meadows	University Credit Union Center (574); Davis, CA
January 1, 2022; 7:00 p.m., Stadium		BYU	Canceled					Chiles Center; Portland, OR
January 13, 2022; 7:00 p.m.		at San Diego	L 63–68 ^{OT}	9–7 (0–1)	16 – Meadows	12 – Wood	3 – Austin	Jenny Craig Pavilion (0); San Diego, CA
January 15, 2022; 5:00 p.m.		at Pepperdine	W 82–63	10–7 (1–1)	22 – Austin	10 – Nduka	6 – Robertson	Firestone Fieldhouse (465); Malibu, CA
January 17, 2022; 4:00 p.m.		at Loyola Marymount; Rescheduled from Jan. 6	L 58–70	10–8 (1–2)	16 – Nduka	7 – Nduka	4 – Austin	Gersten Pavilion (635); Los Angeles, CA
January 22, 2022; 6:00 p.m., Stadium		at BYU	L 65–78	10–9 (1–3)	15 – Robertson	10 – Wood	4 – Robertson	Marriott Center (14,837); Provo, UT
January 27, 2022; 7:00 p.m., KRCW		Pacific	W 64–56	11–9 (2–3)	19 – Wood	10 – Robertson	5 – Robertson	Chiles Center (1,010); Portland, OR
January 29, 2022; 6:00 p.m., RTNW		at No. 2 Gonzaga	L 72–104	11–10 (2–4)	19 – Meadows	11 – Sjolund	3 – Austin	McCarthey Athletic Center (6,000); Spokane, WA
February 3, 2022; 8:00 p.m., RTNW		Saint Mary's	L 54–75	11–11 (2–5)	15 – Robertson	10 – Nduka	3 – Robertson	Chiles Center (1,113); Portland, OR
February 5, 2022; 5:00 p.m., KRCW		San Francisco	L 71–74	11–12 (2–6)	25 – Austin	8 – Wood	5 – Robertson	Chiles Center (1,206); Portland, OR
February 8, 2022; 7:00 p.m.		at San Francisco	W 69–68	12–12 (3–6)	23 – Sjolund	18 – Sjolund	2 – tied	War Memorial Gymnasium (1,827); San Francisco, CA
February 12, 2022; 7:00 p.m., RTNW		Loyola Marymount	W 86–76	13–12 (4–6)	31 – Robertson	11 – Robertson	11 – Robertson	Chiles Center (1,569); Portland, OR
February 14, 2022; 6:00 p.m., KRCW		Santa Clara; Rescheduled from Jan. 8	Canceled					Chiles Center; Portland, OR
February 15, 2022*; 5:00 p.m.		Bushnell	W 84–39	14–12	11 – tied	14 – Nduka	4 – Harvey	Chiles Center (668); Portland, OR
February 17, 2022; 7:00 p.m., KRCW		San Diego	W 92–60	15–12 (5–6)	26 – Austin	10 – Wood	8 – Robertson	Chiles Center (1,188); Portland, OR
February 19, 2022; 5:00 p.m.		Pepperdine	W 77–74	16–12 (6–6)	24 – Wood	8 – Wood	9 – Robertson	Chiles Center (2,409); Portland, OR
February 24, 2022; 7:00 p.m.		at Pacific	W 75–69	17–12 (7–6)	18 – Wood	8 – Wood	6 – Austin	Alex G. Spanos Center (1,093); Stockton, CA
February 26, 2022; 2:00 p.m.		at Santa Clara	L 89–102	17–13 (7–7)	23 – Wood	7 – Wood	6 – Robertson	Leavey Center (2,113); Santa Clara, CA
WCC tournament
March 4, 2022; 8:00 p.m., RTNW/BYUtv	(6)	vs. (7) San Diego; Second round	W 73–55	18–13	28 – Wood	11 – Sjolund	9 – Robertson	Orleans Arena; Paradise, NV
March 5, 2022; 9:30 p.m., ESPN2	(6)	vs. (3) Santa Clara; Third round	L 67–91	18–14	19 – Austin	6 – tied	2 – Wood	Orleans Arena; Paradise, NV
The Basketball Classic
March 19, 2022*; 7:00 p.m., ESPN+		New Orleans; First round	W 94–73	19–14	21 – Sjolund	9 – Nduka	7 – Robertson	Chiles Center (659); Portland, OR
March 26, 2022*; 3:00 p.m., ESPN+		at Southern Utah; Quarterfinals	L 66–77	19–15	27 – Robertson	10 – Robertson	4 – Wood	America First Event Center (1,504); Cedar City, UT
*Non-conference game. ^{#}Rankings from AP poll. (#) Tournament seedings in parentheses. All times are in Pacific.
