= 2021–22 LSU Tigers men's basketball team =

American college basketball season

2021–22 LSU Tigers men's basketball

Emerald Coast Classic champions

NCAA tournament, First Round
- Conference: Southeastern Conference
- Record: 22–12 (9–9 SEC)
- Head coach: Will Wade (5th season); Kevin Nickelberry (interim)
- Associate head coach: Bill Armstrong
- Assistant coaches: Tasmin Mitchell; Kevin Nickelberry
- Home arena: Pete Maravich Assembly Center

2021–22 Southeastern Conference men's basketball standings
	Conf.				Overall
Team	W		L	PCT	W		L	PCT
No. 14 Auburn	15	–	3	.833	28	–	6	.824
No. 16 Kentucky	14	–	4	.778	26	–	8	.765
No. 15 Tennessee †	14	–	4	.778	27	–	8	.771
No. 8 Arkansas	13	–	5	.722	28	–	9	.757
LSU	9	–	9	.500	22	–	12	.647
Alabama	9	–	9	.500	19	–	14	.576
South Carolina	9	–	9	.500	18	–	13	.581
Texas A&M	9	–	9	.500	27	–	13	.675
Florida	9	–	9	.500	20	–	14	.588
Mississippi State	8	–	10	.444	18	–	16	.529
Vanderbilt	7	–	11	.389	19	–	17	.528
Missouri	5	–	13	.278	12	–	21	.364
Ole Miss	4	–	14	.222	13	–	19	.406
Georgia	1	–	17	.056	6	–	26	.188
† 2022 SEC tournament winner Rankings from AP poll

The 2021–22 LSU Tigers basketball team represented Louisiana State University during the 2021–22 NCAA Division I men's basketball season. The team's head coach was Will Wade, in his fifth (and final) season at LSU. They played their home games at the Pete Maravich Assembly Center in Baton Rouge, Louisiana, as a member of the Southeastern Conference. They finished the season 22–12, 9–9 in SEC Play to finish a five-way tie for fifth place. As the No. 5 seed in the SEC tournament, they defeated Missouri in the Second Round, before losing in the quarterfinals to Arkansas. They received an at-large bid to the NCAA tournament as the No. 6 seed in the Midwest Region, where they were upset in the First Round by Iowa State.

Following the team's loss in the SEC Tournament, the school fired head coach Will Wade after receiving notification of significant NCAA violations by Wade. Assistant coach Kevin Nickelberry coached the team in their NCAA Tournament game. On March 21, 2022, the school named Murray State head coach Matt McMahon the team's new head coach.

== Previous season ==
In a season limited due to the ongoing COVID-19 pandemic, the Tigers finished the season 19–10, 11–6 in SEC play to finish in third place. They defeated Ole Miss and Arkansas in the SEC tournament to advance to the championship game where they lost to Alabama. They received an at-large bid to the NCAA tournament as the No. 8 seed in the East Region where they defeated St. Bonaventure in the first round before losing to Michigan in the second round.

== Offseason ==
=== Departures ===
Name	Number	Pos.	Height	Weight	Year	Hometown	Reason for departure
Javonte Smart	1	G	6'4"	205	Junior	Baton Rouge, LA	Declared for the 2021 NBA draft
Trendon Watford	2	F	6'9"	240	Sophomore	Birmingham, AL	Declared for the 2021 NBA draft
Jalen Cook	3	G	6'0"	205	Freshman	Walker, LA	Transferred to Tulane
Josh LeBlanc Sr.	11	G	6'7"	230	Junior	Baton Rouge, LA	Transferred to UAB
Aundre Hyatt	15	F	6'6"	225	RS Sophomore	The Bronx, NY	Transferred to Rutgers
Charles Manning Jr.	21	G	6'5"	205	Junior	Riverhead, NY	Transferred to South Alabama
Bryan Penn-Johnson	22	C	7'0"	260	Sophomore	Long Beach, CA	Transferred to East Los Angeles College
Cameron Thomas	24	G	6'4"	210	Freshman	Chesapeake, VA	Declared for the 2021 NBA draft
Josh Gray	34	C	6'11"	255	Freshman	Brooklyn, NY	Transferred to South Carolina

=== Incoming transfers ===
Name	Number	Pos.	Height	Weight	Year	Hometown	Previous School
Xavier Pinson	1	G	6'2"	154	Senior	Chicago, IL	Missouri
Tari Eason	13	F	6'8"	216	Sophomore	Seattle, WA	Cincinnati
Adam Miller	44	G	6'2"	185	Sophomore	Peoria, IL	Illinois

=== 2021 recruiting class ===
College recruiting information
Name	Hometown	School	Height	Weight	Commit date
Efton Reid; C	Richmond, VA	IMG Academy (FL)	6 ft 11 in (2.11 m)	240 lb (110 kg)	May 9, 2021
Efton Reid; C	Recruit ratings: Rivals: 247Sports: ESPN: (91)				
Jerrell Colbert; C	Houston, TX	Houston (TN)	6 ft 9 in (2.06 m)	205 lb (93 kg)	Mar 1, 2020
Jerrell Colbert; C	Recruit ratings: Rivals: 247Sports: ESPN: (84)				
Brandon Murray; SG	Baltimore, MD	IMG Academy (FL)	6 ft 5 in (1.96 m)	220 lb (100 kg)	Aug 15, 2020
Brandon Murray; SG	Recruit ratings: Rivals: 247Sports: ESPN: (82)				
Justice Williams; SG	Philadelphia, PA	Montverde Academy (FL)	6 ft 3 in (1.91 m)	170 lb (77 kg)	Jun 17, 2021
Justice Williams; SG	Recruit ratings: Rivals: 247Sports: ESPN: (81)				
Bradley Ezewiro; C	Torrance, CA	Oak Hill Academy (VA)	6 ft 8 in (2.03 m)	225 lb (102 kg)	Oct 26, 2019
Bradley Ezewiro; C	Recruit ratings: Rivals: 247Sports: ESPN: (77)				
Overall recruit ranking:
Note: In many cases, Scout, Rivals, 247Sports, On3, and ESPN may conflict in their listings of height and weight.; In these cases, the average was taken. ESPN grades are on a 100-point scale.; Sources: "LSU 2021 Basketball Commitments". Rivals.; "2021 LSU Basketball Commits". Scout.; "ESPN". ESPN.; "Scout.com Team Recruiting Rankings". Scout.; "2021 Team Ranking". Rivals.

=== 2022 Recruiting class ===
College recruiting information (2022)
Name	Hometown	School	Height	Weight	Commit date
Julian Phillips #5 SF	Blythewood, SC	Link Year Prep	6 ft 7 in (2.01 m)	210 lb (95 kg)	Oct 8, 2021
Julian Phillips #5 SF	Recruit ratings: Scout: Rivals: 247Sports: ESPN: (91)				
Devin Ree #26 SF	Terry, MS	Terry High School	6 ft 7 in (2.01 m)	185 lb (84 kg)	Dec 10, 2020
Devin Ree #26 SF	Recruit ratings: Scout: Rivals: 247Sports: ESPN: (82)				
Overall recruit ranking:
Note: In many cases, Scout, Rivals, 247Sports, On3, and ESPN may conflict in their listings of height and weight.; In these cases, the average was taken. ESPN grades are on a 100-point scale.; Sources: "LSU 2022 Basketball Commitments". Rivals.; "2022 LSU Basketball Commits". Scout.; "ESPN". ESPN.; "Scout.com Team Recruiting Rankings". Scout.; "2022 Team Ranking". Rivals.

== Roster ==
2021–22 LSU Tigers men's basketball team
Players
Coaches

Pos.	#	Name	Height	Weight	Year	Previous school	Hometown
G	0	Brandon Murray	6 ft 5 in (1.96 m)	214 lb (97 kg)	Fr	IMG Academy	Baltimore, MD
G	1	Xavier Pinson	6 ft 2 in (1.88 m)	154 lb (70 kg)	Sr	Missouri	Chicago, IL
G	2	Eric Gaines	6 ft 2 in (1.88 m)	150 lb (68 kg)	So	Lithonia HS	Lithonia, GA
F	3	Alex Fudge	6 ft 8 in (2.03 m)	185 lb (84 kg)	Fr	Robert E. Lee HS	Jacksonville, FL
F	4	Darius Days	6 ft 7 in (2.01 m)	245 lb (111 kg)	Sr	IMG Academy	Raleigh, FL
F	5	Mwani Wilkinson	6 ft 5 in (1.96 m)	206 lb (93 kg)	So	Bishop Gorman HS	Las Vegas, NV
G	10	Brandon Egemo (W)	6 ft 0 in (1.83 m)	166 lb (75 kg)	So	University HS	Los Angeles, CA
G	11	Justice Williams	6 ft 3 in (1.91 m)	170 lb (77 kg)	Fr	Montverde Academy	Philadelphia, PA
F	13	Tari Eason	6 ft 8 in (2.03 m)	216 lb (98 kg)	So	Cincinnati	Seattle, WA
C	15	Efton Reid	7 ft 0 in (2.13 m)	238 lb (108 kg)	Fr	IMG Academy	Richmond, VA
C	20	Jerrell Colbert	6 ft 10 in (2.08 m)	216 lb (98 kg)	Fr	Houston HS	Houston, TX
F	21	Bradley Ezewiro	6 ft 8 in (2.03 m)	246 lb (112 kg)	Fr	Oak Hill Academy	Torrance, CA
G	22	Spencer Mays (W)	6 ft 3 in (1.91 m)	196 lb (89 kg)	Jr	Baton Rouge CC	Baton Rouge, LA
F	24	Shareef O'Neal	6 ft 10 in (2.08 m)	220 lb (100 kg)	RS Jr	UCLA	Los Angeles, CA
F	25	Adam Benhayoune (W)	6 ft 5 in (1.96 m)	230 lb (104 kg)	Fr	Sandra Day O'Connor HS	Helotes, TX
G	30	Parker Edwards (W)	6 ft 2 in (1.88 m)	214 lb (97 kg)	RS Jr	Southeastern Louisiana	Covington, LA
G	44	Adam Miller (injured) (redshirt)	6 ft 2 in (1.88 m)	185 lb (84 kg)	So	Illinois	Peoria, IL

Head coach

- Will Wade (Clemson)

Assistant coach(es)

- Bill Armstrong (UAB)
- Tasmin Mitchell (LSU)
- Kevin Nickelberry (Virginia Wesleyan University)

Legend

- (C) Team captain
- (S) Suspended
- (I) Ineligible
- (W) Walk-on
- Injured
- Current redshirt

Roster

== Schedule and results ==
Date time, TV	Rank^{#}	Opponent^{#}	Result	Record	High points	High rebounds	High assists	Site (attendance) city, state
Regular season
November 9, 2021*; 7:00 p.m., SECN+		Louisiana–Monroe	W 101–39	1–0	30 – Days	10 – Eason	7 – Tied	Pete Maravich Assembly Center (9,969); Baton Rouge, LA
November 12, 2021*; 7:00 p.m., SECN+		Texas State	W 84–59	2–0	17 – Tied	10 – Eason	5 – Gaines	Pete Maravich Assembly Center (11,030); Baton Rouge, LA
November 15, 2021*; 6:00 p.m., ESPNU		Liberty	W 74–58	3–0	26 – Days	7 – Tied	7 – Pinson	Pete Maravich Assembly Center (8,940); Baton Rouge, LA
November 18, 2021*; 7:00 p.m., SECN+		McNeese State; Emerald Coast Classic campus-site game	W 85–46	4–0	19 – Eason	14 – Eason	8 – Pinson	Pete Maravich Assembly Center (9,062); Baton Rouge, LA
November 22, 2021*; 7:00 p.m., SECN+		Belmont	W 83–53	5–0	15 – Tied	9 – Reid	3 – Tied	Pete Maravich Assembly Center (9,923); Baton Rouge, LA
November 26, 2021*; 6:00 p.m., CBSSN		vs. Penn State; Emerald Coast Classic semifinals	W 68–63 ^{OT}	6–0	20 – Eason	9 – Eason	3 – Tied	The Arena at NFSC (2,146); Niceville, FL
November 27, 2021*; 6:00 p.m., CBSSN		vs. Wake Forest; Emerald Coast Classic championship game	W 75–61	7–0	14 – Reid	9 – Fudge	5 – Pinson	The Arena at NFSC (1,700); Niceville, FL
December 1, 2021*; 7:00 p.m., SECN+		Ohio	W 66–51	8–0	20 – Eason	13 – Days	5 – Gaines	Pete Maravich Assembly Center (11,328); Baton Rouge, LA
December 11, 2021*; 5:00 p.m., ESPN2	No. 25	vs. Georgia Tech; Holiday Hoopsgiving	W 69–53	9–0	23 – Eason	10 – Days	6 – Pinson	State Farm Arena (6,137); Atlanta, GA
December 14, 2021*; 6:00 p.m., SECN	No. 19	Northwestern State	W 89–49	10–0	18 – Eason	10 – Reid	4 – Pinson	Pete Maravich Assembly Center (8,904); Baton Rouge, LA
December 18, 2021*; 6:00 p.m., CBSSN	No. 19	vs. Louisiana Tech; Bossier City Showcase	W 66–57	11–0	21 – Eason	18 – Days	2 – Tied	Brookshire Grocery Arena (6,868); Bossier City, LA
December 22, 2021*; 6:00 p.m., SECN	No. 17	Lipscomb	W 95–60	12–0	21 – Days	9 – Reid	6 – Gaines	Pete Maravich Assembly Center (10,767); Baton Rouge, LA
December 29, 2021; 6:00 p.m., ESPNU	No. 16	at No. 11 Auburn	L 55–70	12–1 (0–1)	13 – Pinson	7 – Eason	3 – Pinson	Auburn Arena (9,121); Auburn, AL
January 4, 2022; 6:00 p.m., ESPN	No. 21	No. 16 Kentucky	W 65–60	13–1 (1–1)	13 – Eason	7 – Days	4 – Pinson	Pete Maravich Assembly Center (11,808); Baton Rouge, LA
January 8, 2022; 5:00 p.m., ESPN2	No. 21	No. 18 Tennessee	W 79–67	14–1 (2–1)	24 – Eason	12 – Eason	7 – Pinson	Pete Maravich Assembly Center (12,881); Baton Rouge, LA
January 12, 2022; 6:00 p.m., ESPN2	No. 12	at Florida	W 64–58	15–1 (3–1)	20 – Days	8 – Wilkinson	2 – Tied	O'Connell Center (10,110); Gainesville, FL
January 15, 2022; 1:00 p.m., ESPN2	No. 12	Arkansas	L 58–65	15–2 (3–2)	14 – Gaines	6 – Gaines	5 – Gaines	Pete Maravich Assembly Center (12,734); Baton Rouge, LA
January 19, 2022; 6:00 p.m., ESPN2	No. 13	at Alabama	L 67–70	15–3 (3–3)	26 – Eason	10 – Eason	3 – Wilkinson	Coleman Coliseum (10,368); Tuscaloosa, AL
January 22, 2022; 5:00 p.m., ESPN	No. 13	at No. 24 Tennessee	L 50–64	15–4 (3–4)	16 – Eason	7 – Days	3 – Tied	Thompson–Boling Arena (21,061); Knoxville, TN
January 26, 2022; 8:00 p.m., SECN	No. 19	Texas A&M	W 70–64	16–4 (4–4)	21 – Murray	9 – Eason	3 – Tied	Pete Maravich Assembly Center (10,929); Baton Rouge, LA
January 29, 2022*; 11:00 a.m., ESPN2	No. 19	at TCU; Big 12/SEC Challenge	L 68–77	16–5	16 – Eason	12 – Days	6 – Gaines	Schollmaier Arena (6,539); Fort Worth, TX
February 1, 2022; 8:00 p.m., SECN	No. 25	Ole Miss	L 72–76	16–6 (4–5)	21 – Days	13 – Days	3 – Tied	Pete Maravich Assembly Center (9,707); Baton Rouge, LA
February 5, 2022; 5:00 p.m., SECN	No. 25	at Vanderbilt	L 66–75	16–7 (4–6)	16 – Eason	11 – Days	2 – Tied	Memorial Gymnasium (7,381); Nashville, TN
February 8, 2022; 6:00 p.m., SECN		at Texas A&M	W 76–68	17–7 (5–6)	25 – Eason	12 – Eason	5 – Murray	Reed Arena (6,636); College Station, TX
February 12, 2022; 7:00 p.m., ESPN2		Mississippi State	W 69–65	18–7 (6–6)	23 – Eason	7 – Days	5 – Gaines	Pete Maravich Assembly Center (10,975); Baton Rouge, LA
February 16, 2022; 7:00 p.m., SECN		Georgia	W 84–65	19–7 (7–6)	21 – Eason	12 – Days	10 – Pinson	Pete Maravich Assembly Center (9,064); Baton Rouge, LA
February 19, 2022; 2:30 p.m., SECN		at South Carolina	L 75–77	19–8 (7–7)	21 – Eason	10 – Eason	8 – Pinson	Colonial Life Arena (11,292); Columbia, SC
February 23, 2022; 8:00 p.m., ESPN		at No. 6 Kentucky	L 66–71	19–9 (7–8)	26 – Pinson	8 – Days	8 – Pinson	Rupp Arena (20,199); Lexington, KY
February 26, 2022; 7:30 p.m., SECN		Missouri	W 75–55	20–9 (8–8)	18 – Eason	7 – O'Neal	3 – Pinson	Pete Maravich Assembly Center (9,304); Baton Rouge, LA
March 2, 2022; 8:00 p.m., ESPN2		at No. 14 Arkansas	L 76–77	20–10 (8–9)	24 – Eason	7 – Tied	5 – Pinson	Bud Walton Arena (19,200); Fayetteville, AR
March 5, 2022; 11:00 a.m., CBS		No. 25 Alabama	W 80–77 ^{OT}	21–10 (9–9)	24 – Days	9 – Eason	8 – Pinson	Pete Maravich Assembly Center (11,237); Baton Rouge, LA
SEC Tournament
March 10, 2022; 1:00 p.m., SECN	(5)	vs. (12) Missouri; Second Round	W 76–68	22–10	19 – Eason	8 – Days	8 – Murray	Amalie Arena; Tampa, FL
March 11, 2022; 1:30 p.m., ESPN	(5)	vs. (4) No. 15 Arkansas; Quarterfinals	L 67–79	22–11	15 – Eason	10 – Days	4 – Murray	Amalie Arena; Tampa, FL
NCAA tournament
Mar 18, 2022; 6:20 p.m., TBS	(6 MW)	vs. (11 MW) Iowa State; First Round	L 54–59	22–12	18 – Eason	12 – Days	7 – Pinson	Fiserv Forum (17,500); Milwaukee, WI
*Non-conference game. ^{#}Rankings from AP Poll. (#) Tournament seedings in parentheses. All times are in Central Time.

Schedule Source

== Rankings ==
Ranking movements Legend: ██ Increase in ranking ██ Decrease in ranking — = Not ranked RV = Received votes
	Week																				
Poll	Pre	1	2	3	4	5	6	7	8	9	10	11	12	13	14	15	16	17	18	19	Final
AP	RV	RV	RV	RV	25	19	17	16	21	12	13	19	25	RV							Not released
Coaches	RV	^	RV	RV	24	20	16	16	21	12	16	18	25	—	—	—	—	—	—	—	

*AP does not release post-NCAA Tournament rankings
^Coaches did not release a Week 2 poll

== See also ==
- 2021–22 LSU Tigers women's basketball team
