= 2021–22 Houston Cougars men's basketball team =

American college basketball season

2021–22 Houston Cougars men's basketball

AAC tournament champions AAC regular season champions

NCAA tournament, Elite Eight
- Conference: American Athletic Conference

Ranking
- Coaches: No. 7
- AP: No. 15
- Record: 32–6 (15–3 AAC)
- Head coach: Kelvin Sampson (8th season)
- Assistant coaches: K.C. Beard; Hollis Price; Kellen Sampson; Quannas White
- Home arena: Fertitta Center

2021–22 American Athletic Conference men's basketball standings
	Conf.				Overall
Team	W		L	PCT	W		L	PCT
No. 15 Houston †	15	–	3	.833	32	–	6	.842
SMU	13	–	4	.765	24	–	9	.727
Memphis	13	–	5	.722	22	–	11	.667
Temple	10	–	7	.588	17	–	12	.586
Tulane	10	–	8	.556	14	–	15	.483
UCF	9	–	9	.500	18	–	12	.600
Wichita State	6	–	9	.400	15	–	13	.536
Cincinnati	7	–	11	.389	18	–	15	.545
East Carolina	6	–	11	.353	15	–	15	.500
Tulsa	4	–	14	.222	11	–	20	.355
South Florida	3	–	15	.167	8	–	23	.258
† 2022 AAC tournament winner Rankings from AP poll

The 2021–22 Houston Cougars men's basketball team represented the University of Houston in the 2021–22 NCAA Division I men's basketball season. The Cougars were led by eighth-year head coach Kelvin Sampson. The team played their home games at the Fertitta Center as members of the American Athletic Conference.

Houston finished its 2021–22 regular season with an overall record of 26–5. They were regular-season champions of the American Conference with a record of 15–3 in conference play. They entered the conference tournament as the #1 seed and proceeded to win the tournament, defeating Memphis 71–53 in the final. The Cougars entered the NCAA tournament as the #5 seed in the South Regional. Houston went 3–1 in the tournament, reaching the Elite Eight before falling 50–44 to Villanova in the regional final.

Houston finished the season with a record of 32–6 and a ranking of #7 in the final Coaches Poll.

== Previous season ==
Houston finished the 2020–21 regular season 21–3, 14–3 in AAC play, finishing in second place for the regular season. They entered as the No. 2 seed in the AAC tournament, which the Cougars would go on to win for the first time to clinch an auto-bid to the NCAA tournament. They were selected as a #2 seed in the Midwest Region. The team advanced to the Final Four for the first time since 1984, where they lost to eventual national champions Baylor.

== Offseason ==
=== Departing players ===
Houston departing players
Name	Number	Pos.	Height	Weight	Year	Hometown	Reason for departure
Caleb Mills	2	G	6'3"	180	(redshirt) Sophomore	Arden, NC	Transferred to Florida State (mid-season)
DeJon Jarreau	3	G	6'5"	185	(redshirt) Senior	New Orleans, LA	Graduated; declared for the 2021 NBA draft (Note: For the 2021 draft only, the NBA and its players union agreed that seniors would have to declare themselves eligible for the draft. This was an aftereffect of the NCAA's announcement that the 2020–21 season would not count against the athletic eligibility of any participant in the organization's winter sports, including basketball. This in turn meant that every senior in the 2020–21 season had remaining eligibility.)
Justin Gorham	4	F	6'7"	225	(redshirt) Senior	Baltimore, MD	Graduated; declared for the 2021 NBA draft
Cameron Tyson	5	G	6'2"	190	(redshirt) Sophomore	Bothell, WA	Transferred to Seattle
Quentin Grimes	24	G	6'5"	205	Junior	The Woodlands, TX	Declared for the 2021 NBA draft; selected 25th overall by the Los Angeles Clippers
Brison Gresham	55	F/C	6'8"	230	(redshirt) Senior	New Orleans, LA	Graduate transferred to Texas Southern

=== Incoming transfers ===
Houston incoming transfers
Name	Number	Pos.	Height	Weight	Year	Hometown	Previous school	Years remaining	Date eligible
Tazé Moore	4	G	6'5"	195	Graduate student	Southaven, MS	CSU Bakersfield	1	October 1, 2021
Kyler Edwards	11	G	6'4"	205	Senior	Arlington, TX	Texas Tech	2	October 1, 2021
Josh Carlton	25	F/C	6'10"	245	Graduate student	Winterville, NC	UConn	1	October 1, 2021

=== 2021 recruiting class ===
College recruiting
Name	Hometown	School	Height	Weight	Commit date
Ramon Walker Jr. SF	Pearland, TX	Shadow Creek High School	6 ft 5 in (1.96 m)	195 lb (88 kg)	May 20, 2020
Ramon Walker Jr. SF	Recruit ratings: Rivals: 247Sports: (76)				
Robbie Armbrester; PF	Atlanta, GA	Wasatch Academy	6 ft 6 in (1.98 m)	215 lb (98 kg)	Sep 7, 2020
Robbie Armbrester; PF	Recruit ratings: Rivals: 247Sports: (77)				
Ja'Vier Francis; C	New Orleans, LA	Montverde Academy	6 ft 8 in (2.03 m)	200 lb (91 kg)	Sep 27, 2020
Ja'Vier Francis; C	Recruit ratings: Rivals: 247Sports: (78)				
Overall recruit ranking: 247Sports: 29
Note: In many cases, Scout, Rivals, 247Sports, On3, and ESPN may conflict in their listings of height and weight.; In these cases, the average was taken. ESPN grades are on a 100-point scale.; Sources: "2021 Team Ranking". Rivals.

=== 2022 recruiting class ===
College recruiting (2022)
Name	Hometown	School	Height	Weight	Commit date
Emanuel Sharp; SG	Tampa, FL	Bishop McLaughlin Catholic High School	6 ft 4 in (1.93 m)	200 lb (91 kg)	May 13, 2021
Emanuel Sharp; SG	Recruit ratings: Rivals: 247Sports: (82)				
Terrance Arceneaux; SF	Beaumont, TX	Beaumont United High School	6 ft 7 in (2.01 m)	190 lb (86 kg)	Sep 17, 2021
Terrance Arceneaux; SF	Recruit ratings: Rivals: 247Sports: (83)				
Jarace Walker; PF / SF	New Freedom, PA	IMG Academy	6 ft 8 in (2.03 m)	220 lb (100 kg)	Nov 4, 2021
Jarace Walker; PF / SF	Recruit ratings: Rivals: 247Sports: (92)				
Overall recruit ranking: 247Sports: 12
Note: In many cases, Scout, Rivals, 247Sports, On3, and ESPN may conflict in their listings of height and weight.; In these cases, the average was taken. ESPN grades are on a 100-point scale.; Sources: "2022 Team Ranking". Rivals.

== Preseason ==
=== AAC preseason media poll ===
On October 13, The American released the preseason poll and other preseason awards.

Coaches Poll
Predicted finish	Team	Votes (1st place)
1	Houston	98 (8)
2	Memphis	92 (3)
3	SMU	77
4	Wichita State	76
5	UCF	66
6	Cincinnati	52
7	Tulsa	43
8	Temple	37
T-9	South Florida	25
T-9	Tulane	25
11	East Carolina	14

=== Preseason awards ===
- All-AAC First Team – Marcus Sasser

== Roster ==
2021–22 Houston Cougars men's basketball team
Players
Coaches

Pos.	#	Name	Height	Weight	Year	Previous school	Hometown
G	0	Marcus Sasser	6 ft 2 in (1.88 m)	195 lb (88 kg)	Jr	Red Oak HS	Dallas, TX
G	1	Jamal Shead	6 ft 1 in (1.85 m)	190 lb (86 kg)	So	Manor HS	Manor, TX
G	2	Robbie Armbrester	6 ft 4 in (1.93 m)	220 lb (100 kg)	Fr	Wasatch Academy	Atlanta, GA
G	3	Ramon Walker Jr.	6 ft 4 in (1.93 m)	210 lb (95 kg)	Fr	Shadow Creek HS	Pearland, TX
G	4	Tazé Moore	6 ft 5 in (1.96 m)	195 lb (88 kg)	GS	CSU Bakersfield	Southaven, MS
F	5	Ja'Vier Francis	6 ft 8 in (2.03 m)	225 lb (102 kg)	Fr	Montverde Academy	New Orleans, LA
G	11	Kyler Edwards	6 ft 4 in (1.93 m)	205 lb (93 kg)	Sr	Texas Tech	Arlington, TX
G	12	Tramon Mark	6 ft 5 in (1.96 m)	195 lb (88 kg)	So	Dickinson HS	Dickinson, TX
F	13	J'Wan Roberts	6 ft 7 in (2.01 m)	230 lb (104 kg)	RS So	Shoemaker HS	Saint Thomas, USVI
G	20	Ryan Elvin (W)	6 ft 0 in (1.83 m)	165 lb (75 kg)	So	Cedar Ridge HS	Round Rock, TX
F/C	25	Josh Carlton	6 ft 10 in (2.08 m)	245 lb (111 kg)	GS	UConn	Winterville, NC
F	32	Reggie Chaney	6 ft 8 in (2.03 m)	230 lb (104 kg)	Sr	Arkansas	Tulsa, OK
F	35	Fabian White Jr.	6 ft 8 in (2.03 m)	230 lb (104 kg)	GS	Atascocita HS	Atascocita, TX
C	52	Kiyron Powell (redshirt)	6 ft 8 in (2.03 m)	210 lb (95 kg)	So	Benjamin Bosse HS	Evansville, IN

Head coach

- Kelvin Sampson (UNC Pembroke)

Assistant coach(es)

- K.C. Beard (Boise State)
- Hollis Price (Oklahoma)
- Kellen Sampson (Oklahoma)
- Quannas White (Oklahoma)

Legend

- (C) Team captain
- (S) Suspended
- (I) Ineligible
- (W) Walk-on
- Injured
- Current redshirt

Roster
Last update: July 6, 2021

- December 22, 2021 – Tramon Mark had shoulder surgery, leading him to miss the rest of the season.
- December 24, 2021 – Marcus Sasser announced he would miss the rest of the season due to a foot injury.

== Schedule and results ==
Date time, TV	Rank^{#}	Opponent^{#}	Result	Record	High points	High rebounds	High assists	Site (attendance) city, state
Exhibition
November 6, 2021*; 3:00 p.m.	No. 15	Montana Tech	W 78–51		21 – Sasser	9 – White Jr.	7 – Shead	Fertitta Center; Houston, TX
Non-conference regular season
November 9, 2021*; 7:00 p.m., ESPN+	No. 15	Hofstra	W 83–75 ^{OT}	1–0	25 – Sasser	15 – Roberts	3 – Tied	Fertitta Center (6,883); Houston, TX
November 12, 2021*; 7:00 p.m., ESPN+	No. 15	Rice; Rivalry	W 79–46	2–0	26 – Sasser	9 – Roberts	5 – Sasser	Fertitta Center (6,967); Houston, TX
November 16, 2021*; 7:00 p.m., ESPN	No. 15	Virginia	W 67–47	3–0	19 – Sasser	8 – White Jr.	4 – Sasser	Fertitta Center (7,051); Houston, TX
November 22, 2021*; 3:30 p.m., ESPN2	No. 12	vs. Butler; Maui Invitational Tournament quarterfinal	W 70–52	4–0	21 – White Jr.	8 – White Jr.	4 – Edwards	Michelob Ultra Arena (2,937); Paradise, NV
November 23, 2021*; 4:00 p.m., ESPN	No. 12	vs. Wisconsin; Maui Invitational Tournament semifinal	L 63–65	4–1	18 – Edwards	6 – Roberts	5 – Shead	Michelob Ultra Arena (3,391); Paradise, NV
November 24, 2021*; 1:30 p.m., ESPN2	No. 12	vs. Oregon; Maui Invitational Tournament 3rd-place game	W 78–49	5–1	15 – White Jr.	7 – White Jr.	6 – Shead	Michelob Ultra Arena (2,901); Paradise, NV
November 30, 2021*; 7:00 p.m., ESPN+	No. 15	Northwestern State	W 99–58	6–1	26 – Sasser	8 – White Jr.	9 – Shead	Fertitta Center (6,639); Houston, TX
December 3, 2021*; 7:00 p.m., ESPN+	No. 15	Bryant	W 111–44	7–1	22 – Mark	12 – Roberts	4 – Tied	Fertitta Center (7,051); Houston, TX
December 6, 2021*; 7:00 p.m., ESPN+	No. 14	Alcorn State	W 77–45	8–1	18 – Mark	7 – Edwards	11 – Shead	Fertitta Center (6,649); Houston, TX
December 11, 2021*; 9:00 p.m., ESPN2	No. 14	at No. 9 Alabama	L 82–83	8–2	25 – Sasser	13 – Roberts	3 – Shead	Coleman Coliseum (10,613); Tuscaloosa, AL
December 14, 2021*; 7:00 p.m., ESPN+	No. 14	Louisiana	W 71–56	9–2	17 – Carlton	10 – Moore	5 – Shead	Fertitta Center (6,955); Houston, TX
December 18, 2021*; 6:00 p.m., ESPNU	No. 14	vs. Oklahoma State; Hoop Hype XL College Basketball Showcase	W 72–61	10–2	18 – Shead	11 – Carlton	8 – Shead	Dickies Arena (1,800); Fort Worth, TX
December 22, 2021*; 7:00 p.m., ESPN+	No. 13	Texas State	W 80–47	11–2	20 – Carlton	5 – Tied	10 – Shead	Fertitta Center (7,488); Houston, TX
AAC regular season
January 2, 2022; 4:00 p.m., ESPN	No. 12	at Temple	W 66–61	12–2 (1–0)	15 – White Jr.	14 – White Jr.	6 – Shead	Liacouras Center (3,229); Philadelphia, PA
January 5, 2022; 6:00 p.m., ESPN+	No. 12	at South Florida	W 83–66	13–2 (2–0)	30 – Carlton	11 – Carlton	8 – Edwards	Yuengling Center (2,291); Tampa, FL
January 8, 2022; 11:00 a.m., CBS	No. 12	Wichita State	W 76–66	14–2 (3–0)	22 – Carlton	12 – Carlton	7 – Shead	Fertitta Center (7,051); Houston, TX
January 15, 2022; 7:00 p.m., ESPN2	No. 11	at Tulsa	W 66–64	15–2 (4–0)	29 – Edwards	11 – Moore	3 – Edwards	Reynolds Center (3,349); Tulsa, OK
January 18, 2022; 7:00 p.m., ESPN+	No. 10	South Florida	W 74–55	16–2 (5–0)	23 – Edwards	7 – Edwards	5 – Shead	Fertitta Center (6,959); Houston, TX
January 22, 2022; 5:00 p.m., ESPN2	No. 10	East Carolina	W 79–36	17–2 (6–0)	25 – Edwards	9 – Carlton	7 – Edwards	Fertitta Center (7,287); Houston, TX
January 29, 2022; 7:00 p.m., ESPN2	No. 7	at UCF	W 63–49	18–2 (7–0)	17 – Edwards	15 – Carlton	4 – Edwards	Addition Financial Arena (8,142); Orlando, FL
February 2, 2022; 7:00 p.m., ESPN+	No. 6	Tulane	W 73–62	19–2 (8–0)	21 – White Jr.	9 – Carlton	6 – Tied	Fertitta Center (7,312); Houston, TX
February 6, 2022; 5:00 p.m., ESPN2	No. 6	at Cincinnati	W 80–58	20–2 (9–0)	22 – White Jr.	9 – White Jr.	6 – Shead	Fifth Third Arena (11,742); Cincinnati, OH
February 9, 2022; 6:00 p.m., ESPN2	No. 6	at SMU; Rivalry	L 83–85	20–3 (9–1)	17 – Tied	13 – White Jr.	12 – Shead	Moody Coliseum (5,247); University Park, TX
February 12, 2022; 2:30 p.m., ABC	No. 6	Memphis	L 59–69	20–4 (9–2)	15 – Tied	8 – Moore	4 – Moore	Fertitta Center (7,450); Houston, TX
February 17, 2022; 8:00 p.m., ESPN2	No. 14	UCF	W 70–52	21–4 (10–2)	14 – Moore	10 – Carlton	8 – Shead	Fertitta Center (6,957); Houston, TX
February 20, 2022; 12:00 p.m., ESPN	No. 14	at Wichita State	W 76–74 ^{2OT}	22–4 (11–2)	23 – Carlton	11 – Carlton	9 – Shead	Charles Koch Arena (9,070); Wichita, KS
February 23, 2022; 7:00 p.m., ESPN+	No. 14	at Tulane	W 81–67	23–4 (12–2)	21 – Edwards	11 – Roberts	7 – Shead	Devlin Fieldhouse (2,707); New Orleans, LA
February 27, 2022; 11:30 a.m., ESPN	No. 14	SMU; Rivalry	W 75–61	24–4 (13–2)	21 – White Jr.	9 – White Jr.	11 – Shead	Fertitta Center (7,603); Houston, TX
March 1, 2022; 8:00 p.m., ESPNU	No. 14	Cincinnati; Previously scheduled for Dec. 28	W 71–53	25–4 (14–2)	28 – White Jr.	10 – White Jr.	4 – Edwards	Fertitta Center (7,598); Houston, TX
March 3, 2022; 6:00 p.m., ESPN2	No. 14	Temple	W 84–46	26–4 (15–2)	26 – White Jr.	8 – Carlton	13 – Shead	Fertitta Center (7,562); Houston, TX
March 6, 2022; 11:00 a.m., CBS	No. 14	at Memphis	L 61–75	26–5 (15–3)	19 – Edwards	7 – Edwards	8 – Shead	FedExForum (17,946); Memphis, TN
AAC tournament
March 11, 2022; 12:00 p.m., ESPN2	(1) No. 18	vs. (8) Cincinnati; Quarterfinals	W 69–56	27–5	18 – White Jr.	8 – White Jr.	7 – Shead	Dickies Arena; Fort Worth, TX
March 12, 2022; 2:00 p.m., ESPN2	(1) No. 18	vs. (5) Tulane; Semifinals	W 86–66	28–5	20 – Edwards	13 – Roberts	8 – Edwards	Dickies Arena; Fort Worth, TX
March 13, 2022; 2:15 p.m., ESPN	(1) No. 18	vs. (3) Memphis; Championship	W 71–53	29–5	20 – White Jr.	11 – Edwards	8 – Moore	Dickies Arena; Fort Worth, TX
NCAA tournament
March 18, 2022*; 8:40 p.m., TNT	(5 S) No. 15	vs. (12 S) UAB; First Round	W 82–68	30–5	25 – Edwards	7 – Edwards	7 – Shead	PPG Paints Arena (17,410); Pittsburgh, PA
March 20, 2022*; 11:10 a.m., CBS	(5 S) No. 15	vs. (4 S) No. 19 Illinois; Second Round	W 68–53	31–5	21 – Moore	7 – Tied	4 – Edwards	PPG Paints Arena (18,506); Pittsburgh, PA
March 24, 2022*; 8:55 p.m., TBS	(5 S) No. 15	vs. (1 S) No. 2 Arizona; Sweet Sixteen	W 72–60	32–5	21 – Shead	7 – Carlton	6 – Shead	AT&T Center (17,357); San Antonio, TX
March 26, 2022*; 5:09 p.m., TBS	(5 S) No. 15	vs. (2 S) No. 6 Villanova; Elite Eight	L 44–50	32–6	15 – Moore	10 – Moore	4 – Edwards	AT&T Center (17,186); San Antonio, TX
*Non-conference game. ^{#}Rankings from AP poll. (#) Tournament seedings in parentheses. All times are in Central Time.

== Rankings ==
Ranking movements Legend: ██ Increase in ranking ██ Decrease in ranking т = Tied with team above or below
	Week																			
Poll	Pre	1	2	3	4	5	6	7	8	9	10	11	12	13	14	15	16	17	18	Final
AP	15	15	12	15	14	14	13	12	12	11	10	7т	6	6	14	14	14т	18	15	Not released
Coaches	14	14^	11	14	13	13	14	14	14	11	10	9	9	7	15	15	14	18	15	7

*AP does not release post-NCAA tournament rankings.
^Coaches did not release a week 1 poll.

== Awards and honors ==
=== American Athletic Conference honors ===
==== All-AAC Awards ====
- Coach of the Year: Kelvin Sampson

==== All-AAC First Team ====
- Josh Carlton
- Fabian White Jr.

==== All-AAC Second Team ====
- Kyler Edwards

==== All-AAC Third Team ====
- Jamal Shead
