= 2021–22 Tulane Green Wave men's basketball team =

American college basketball season

2021–22 Tulane Green Wave men's basketball
- Conference: American Athletic Conference
- Record: 14–15 (10–8 AAC)
- Head coach: Ron Hunter (3rd season)
- Assistant coaches: Ray McCallum; Claude Pardue; Kevin Johnson
- Home arena: Devlin Fieldhouse

2021–22 American Athletic Conference men's basketball standings
	Conf.				Overall
Team	W		L	PCT	W		L	PCT
No. 15 Houston †	15	–	3	.833	32	–	6	.842
SMU	13	–	4	.765	24	–	9	.727
Memphis	13	–	5	.722	22	–	11	.667
Temple	10	–	7	.588	17	–	12	.586
Tulane	10	–	8	.556	14	–	15	.483
UCF	9	–	9	.500	18	–	12	.600
Wichita State	6	–	9	.400	15	–	13	.536
Cincinnati	7	–	11	.389	18	–	15	.545
East Carolina	6	–	11	.353	15	–	15	.500
Tulsa	4	–	14	.222	11	–	20	.355
South Florida	3	–	15	.167	8	–	23	.258
† 2022 AAC tournament winner Rankings from AP poll

The 2021–22 Tulane Green Wave men's basketball team represented Tulane University during the 2021–22 NCAA Division I men's basketball season. The Green Wave, led by third-year head coach Ron Hunter, played their home games at Devlin Fieldhouse in New Orleans, Louisiana as seventh-year members of the American Athletic Conference. They finished the season 14–15, 10–8 in AAC Play to finish in 5th place. They defeated Temple in the quarterfinals of the AAC tournament before losing in the semifinals to Houston.

== Previous season ==
In a season limited due to the ongoing COVID-19 pandemic, the Green Wave 10–13, 4–13 in AAC play to finish in 10th place. In the AAC tournament, they defeated Tulsa in the first round before losing to Houston in the quarterfinals.

== Offseason ==
=== Departures ===
Name	Number	Pos.	Height	Weight	Year	Hometown	Reason for departure
Gabe Watson	0	G	6'2"	190	Junior	Jackson, MS	Transferred to Jackson State
Jordan Walker	2	G	5'11"	170	RS Junior	Port Washington, NY	Graduate transferred to UAB
Ibrahim Ali	11	F	6'10"	245	RS Sophomore	Lagos, Nigeria	
Ben Callahan-Gold	32	G/F	6'7"	205	Freshman	New York, NY	Walk-on; transferred
Alec Zaccardo	34	G	6'0"	160	Junior	Boston, MA	Walk-on; didn't return

=== Incoming transfers ===
Name	Num	Pos.	Height	Weight	Year	Hometown	Previous School
Braelee Albert	0	G/F	6'5"	220	Junior	Los Angeles, CA	Vanderbilt
Jalen Cook	3	G	6'0"	205	Sophomore	Walker, LA	LSU
Quentin Scott	15	F	6'7"	215	Graduate Student	Houma, LA	Texas State
DeVon Baker	20	G	6'2"	190	Senior	Dayton, OH	UNC Asheville
Scott Spencer	22	G	6'6"	210	Graduate Student	Suffolk, VA	La Salle

=== 2021 recruiting class ===
There were no incoming recruits for the class of 2021.

== Roster ==
2021–22 Tulane Green Wave men's basketball team
Players
Coaches

Pos.	#	Name	Height	Weight	Year	Previous school	Hometown
G/F	0	Braelee Albert (W)	6 ft 5 in (1.96 m)	220 lb (100 kg)	Jr	Brentwood School; Vanderbilt	Los Angeles, CA
G	1	Sion James	6 ft 5 in (1.96 m)	205 lb (93 kg)	So	Lanier	Sugar Hill, GA
G	2	Jadan Coleman	6 ft 4 in (1.93 m)	170 lb (77 kg)	So	Bob Jones	Madison, AL
G	3	Jalen Cook	6 ft 0 in (1.83 m)	205 lb (93 kg)	So	Walker; LSU	Walker, LA
F	4	Nobal Days	6 ft 9 in (2.06 m)	220 lb (100 kg)	Jr	Racine Park	Racine, WI
F	10	Oton Jankovic	6 ft 10 in (2.08 m)	215 lb (98 kg)	Jr	Montverde Academy; Vanderbilt	Zagreb, Croatia
G	11	Sandy Ryan (W)	6 ft 3 in (1.91 m)	180 lb (82 kg)	Sr	St. John Bosco	Los Angeles, CA
G	14	Max Bowman (W)	6 ft 0 in (1.83 m)	175 lb (79 kg)	Fr	JSerra Catholic	Newport Beach, CA
F	15	Quentin Scott	6 ft 7 in (2.01 m)	215 lb (98 kg)	GS	Ellender Memorial; Texas State	Houma, LA
G	20	DeVon Baker	6 ft 2 in (1.88 m)	190 lb (86 kg)	Sr	SPIRE Academy; UNC Asheville	Dayton, OH
G	22	Scott Spencer	6 ft 6 in (1.98 m)	210 lb (95 kg)	GS	Blue Ridge; La Salle	Suffolk, VA
G	23	R. J. McGee	6 ft 5 in (1.96 m)	200 lb (91 kg)	Jr	TaylorMade Academy	Chicago, IL
F	24	Kevin Cross Jr.	6 ft 8 in (2.03 m)	240 lb (109 kg)	Jr	Mills HS; Nebraska	Little Rock, AR
G	25	Jaylen Forbes	6 ft 5 in (1.96 m)	185 lb (84 kg)	Jr	Florence HS; Alabama	Florence, MS
F	33	Tylan Pope	6 ft 6 in (1.98 m)	220 lb (100 kg)	RS So	Franklinton	Franklinton, LA

Head coach

- Ron Hunter (Miami (OH))

Assistant coach(es)

- Ray McCallum (Ball State)
- Claude Pardue (Emory)
- Kevin Johnson (Texas–Pan American)

Legend

- (C) Team captain
- (S) Suspended
- (I) Ineligible
- (W) Walk-on
- Injured
- Current redshirt

Roster

== Schedule and results ==
Date time, TV	Rank^{#}	Opponent^{#}	Result	Record	High points	High rebounds	High assists	Site (attendance) city, state
Exhibition
October 29, 2021*; 3:00 p.m.		Louisiana–Monroe	W 92–61		24 – Forbes	8 – Pope	9 – Cook	Devlin Fieldhouse (300); New Orleans, LA
November 3, 2021*; 7:00 p.m.		Louisiana College	W 64–56		16 – James	10 – Cross	5 – Cross	Devlin Fieldhouse (803); New Orleans, LA
Non-conference regular season
November 9, 2021*; 7:00 p.m., ESPN+		Southeastern Louisiana	W 70–67	1–0	28 – Cook	13 – Pope	4 – Cook	Devlin Fieldhouse (1,132); New Orleans, LA
November 13, 2021*; 11:30 a.m., ESPN+		Southern	L 70–73	1–1	20 – Cross	5 – Tied	7 – Cook	Devlin Fieldhouse (1,043); New Orleans, LA
November 17, 2021*; 7:00 p.m., ACCN		at Florida State	L 54–59	1–2	21 – Cook	8 – Forbes	4 – Cook	Donald L. Tucker Civic Center (9,030); Tallahassee, FL
November 22, 2021*; 1:30 p.m., FloHoops		vs. Drexel; Nassau Championship quarterfinals	W 90–87 ^{OT}	2–2	30 – Forbes	11 – Forbes	4 – Cook	Baha Mar Convention Center; Nassau, Bahamas
November 23, 2021*; 4:30 p.m., FloHoops		vs. Toledo; Nassau Championship	L 67–68	2–3	25 – Cook	8 – Cross	2 – Cook	Baha Mar Convention Center; Nassau, Bahamas
November 24, 2021*; 4:30 p.m., FloHoops		vs. Valparaiso; Nassau Championship	L 64–68	2–4	18 – Cross	8 – Cross	3 – Cook	Baha Mar Convention Center; Nassau, Bahamas
November 30, 2021*; 6:00 p.m.		at College of Charleston	L 77–81	2–5	20 – Forbes	7 – Cross	4 – Cross	TD Arena (3,852); Charleston, SC
December 4, 2021*; 1:00 p.m., ESPN+		Alcorn State	W 85–64	3–5	25 – Forbes	7 – Cross	13 – Cross	Devlin Fieldhouse (1,033); New Orleans, LA
December 7, 2021*; 7:00 p.m., ESPN+		College of Charleston	L 72–86	3–6	17 – Tied	7 – Cross	4 – Tied	Devlin Fieldhouse (653); New Orleans, LA
December 14, 2021*; 7:00 p.m., SECN+/ESPN+		at Texas A&M; American/SEC Alliance	Canceled due to COVID-19 protocols					Reed Arena; College Station, TX
December 18, 2021*; 1:00 p.m., ESPN+		Grambling State	Canceled due to COVID-19 protocols					Devlin Fieldhouse; New Orleans, LA
December 21, 2021*; 7:00 p.m., ESPN+		New Orleans	Canceled due to COVID-19 protocols					Devlin Fieldhouse; New Orleans, LA
AAC Regular Season
December 29, 2021; 7:00 p.m., ESPN+		Memphis	W 85–84	4–6 (1–0)	25 – Cook	4 – Forbes	5 – James	Devlin Fieldhouse (1,705); New Orleans, LA
January 1, 2022; 6:00 p.m., ESPN+		at Cincinnati	W 68–60	5–6 (2–0)	20 – Cook	9 – James	4 – Cross	Fifth Third Arena (7,922); Cincinnati, OH
January 5, 2022; 6:00 p.m., ESPN+		at East Carolina	L 80–88 ^{OT}	5–7 (2–1)	24 – Forbes	11 – Cross	5 – Cook	Williams Arena (1,414); Greenville, NC
January 8, 2022; 3:00 p.m., ESPNU		South Florida	W 68–54	6–7 (3–1)	17 – Tied	8 – Tied	4 – Cook	Devlin Fieldhouse (927); New Orleans, LA
January 12, 2022; 7:00 p.m., ESPN+		at Wichita State	W 68–67	7–7 (4–1)	20 – Forbes	7 – Forbes	5 – Cook	Charles Koch Arena (8,089); Wichita, KS
January 15, 2022; 1:00 p.m., ESPN+		SMU	L 66–75	7–8 (4–2)	23 – Cook	8 – Cross	3 – Days	Devlin Fieldhouse (1,107); New Orleans, LA
January 22, 2022; 1:00 p.m., ESPNU		at UCF	L 66–68	7–9 (4–3)	17 – Forbes	5 – Forbes	5 – Cook	Addition Financial Arena (4,508); Orlando, FL
January 26, 2022; 8:00 p.m., ESPNU		Tulsa	W 97–63	8–9 (5–3)	24 – Forbes	8 – Cross	8 – James	Devlin Fieldhouse (1,345); New Orleans, LA
January 29, 2022; 11:00 a.m., ESPNU		Wichita State	W 67–66	9–9 (6–3)	23 – Cook	11 – Cross	4 – James	Devlin Fieldhouse (2,556); New Orleans, LA
February 2, 2022; 7:00 p.m., ESPN+		at No. 6 Houston	L 62–73	9–10 (6–4)	17 – Cross	8 – Tied	3 – Cook	Fertitta Center (7,312); Houston, TX
February 5, 2022; 1:00 p.m., ESPN+		East Carolina	W 86–66	10–10 (7–4)	26 – Forbes	7 – Sion	6 – Cross	Devlin Fieldhouse (1,579); New Orleans, LA
February 9, 2022; 7:00 p.m., ESPN+		at Memphis	L 69–80	10–11 (7–5)	24 – Forbes	9 – Forbes	4 – Tied	FedExForum (13,865); Memphis, TN
February 12, 2022; 2:00 p.m., ESPN+		Temple	W 92–83 ^{OT}	11–11 (8–5)	25 – Forbes	9 – James	8 – Cross	Devlin Fieldhouse (1,448); New Orleans, LA
February 15, 2022; 6:00 p.m., ESPN+		South Florida	W 76–57	12–11 (9–5)	22 – Forbes	8 – Cross	8 – Cook	Yuengling Center (2,078); Tampa, FL
February 23, 2022; 7:00 p.m., ESPN+		No. 14 Houston	L 67–81	12–12 (9–6)	19 – Cook	8 – Cross	3 – Tied	Devlin Fieldhouse (2,707); New Orleans, LA
February 27, 2022; 2:00 p.m., ESPNU		at Temple	L 70–75	12–13 (9–7)	19 – Forbes	8 – Cross	3 – James	Liacouras Center (4,915); Philadelphia, PA
March 3, 2022; 7:00 p.m., ESPN+		UCF	W 82–67	13–13 (10–7)	16 – Forbes	9 – James	6 – Cross	Devlin Fieldhouse (1,569); New Orleans, LA
March 6, 2022; 2:00 p.m., ESPN+		at SMU	L 68–74	13–14 (10–8)	19 – Coleman	10 – Cross	6 – Cross	Moody Coliseum; University Park, TX
AAC tournament
March 11, 2022; 2:00 p.m., ESPN2	(5)	vs. (4) Temple; Quarterfinals	W 69–60	14–14	18 – Cross	9 – Tied	9 – James	Dickies Arena; Fort Worth, TX
March 12, 2022; 2:00 p.m., ESPN2	(5)	vs. (1) No. 18 Houston; Semifinals	L 66–86	14–15	19 – Forbes	7 – Forbes	7 – Cross	Dickies Arena; Fort Worth, TX
*Non-conference game. ^{#}Rankings from AP Poll. (#) Tournament seedings in parentheses. All times are in Central Time.
