= 2021–22 Wichita State Shockers men's basketball team =

American college basketball season

2021–22 Wichita State Shockers men's basketball
- Conference: American Athletic Conference
- Record: 15–13 (6–9 AAC)
- Head coach: Isaac Brown (2nd season)
- Assistant coaches: Tyson Waterman; Lou Gudino; Billy Kennedy
- Home arena: Charles Koch Arena

2021–22 American Athletic Conference men's basketball standings
	Conf.				Overall
Team	W		L	PCT	W		L	PCT
No. 15 Houston †	15	–	3	.833	32	–	6	.842
SMU	13	–	4	.765	24	–	9	.727
Memphis	13	–	5	.722	22	–	11	.667
Temple	10	–	7	.588	17	–	12	.586
Tulane	10	–	8	.556	14	–	15	.483
UCF	9	–	9	.500	18	–	12	.600
Wichita State	6	–	9	.400	15	–	13	.536
Cincinnati	7	–	11	.389	18	–	15	.545
East Carolina	6	–	11	.353	15	–	15	.500
Tulsa	4	–	14	.222	11	–	20	.355
South Florida	3	–	15	.167	8	–	23	.258
† 2022 AAC tournament winner Rankings from AP poll

The 2021–22 Wichita State Shockers men's basketball team represented Wichita State University in the 2021–22 NCAA Division I men's basketball season. The Shockers, led by second-year head coach Isaac Brown, played their home games at Charles Koch Arena in Wichita, Kansas as members of the American Athletic Conference (AAC). They finished the season 15–13, 6–9 in AAC play, to finish in seventh place.

== Previous season ==
In a season limited due to the ongoing COVID-19 pandemic, the Shockers finished the 2020–21 season 16–6, 11–2 in AAC play, to win the regular-season championship. On February 26, 2021 then-interim coach Isaac Brown was named permanent head coach, agreeing to a five-year deal. In the AAC tournament, they defeated South Florida before losing to Cincinnati in the semifinals. The Shockers received an at-large bid to the NCAA tournament, where they lost to Drake in the First Four.

== Offseason ==
=== Departures ===
Wichita State departing players
Name	Number	Pos.	Height	Weight	Year	Hometown	Notes (Note: Due to COVID-19 issues, the NCAA announced that the 2020–21 season would not be counted against the eligibility of any player in any sport held during the organization's winter season, including basketball. This meant that all players had the option to return for 2021–22.)
Alterique Gilbert	3	G	6' 0"	180	Graduate student	Atlanta, GA	Chose not to return to program (Note: Gilbert was a graduate transfer in the 2020–21 season, having graduated from UConn.)
Trey Wade	5	F	6' 6"	221	Senior	Marietta, GA	Graduated; transferred to Arkansas
Remy Robert II	10	G	6' 2"	188	Junior	Baton Rouge, LA	Walk-on; transferring
Trevin Wade	12	G	5' 11"	175	Junior	Marietta, GA	Transferred to Eastern Kentucky
Jacob Herrs	14	G	6' 2"	185	Senior	Wichita, KS	Walk-on; graduated and chose not to return to program
Brycen Bush	15	G	6' 0"	172	Senior	Wichita, KS	Walk-on; graduated and chose not to return to program
Jaden Seymour	22	F	6' 9"	205	Freshman	Charlotte, NC	Transferred to East Tennessee State
Josaphat Bilau	40	F	6' 10"	232	(redshirt) Freshman	La Roche-sur-Yon, France	Transferred to New Mexico JC
Isaiah Poor Bear-Chandler	44	F	6' 9"	250	Junior	Omaha, NE	Transferred to Omaha

=== Incoming transfers ===
Wichita State incoming transfers
Name	Number	Pos.	Height	Weight	Year	Hometown	Notes
Qua Grant	22	G	6' 1"	195	Senior	DeSoto, TX	Transferred from West Texas A&M. Will have two years of eligibility beginning immediately.
Joe Pleasant	32	F	6' 7"	231	Senior	Overland Park, KS	Transferred from Abilene Christian. Will have two years of eligibility beginning immediately.

=== 2021 recruiting class ===
College recruiting information
Name	Hometown	School	Height	Weight	Commit date
Kenny Pohto; C	Stockholm, Sweden	Sunrise Christian Academy	6 ft 11 in (2.11 m)	240 lb (110 kg)	05/04/21
Kenny Pohto; C	Recruit ratings: Rivals: 247Sports: ESPN: (81)				
Jalen Ricks; SG	Sherwood, AR	Oak Hill Academy	6 ft 6 in (1.98 m)	195 lb (88 kg)	06/03/21
Jalen Ricks; SG	Recruit ratings: Rivals: 247Sports: (NR)				
Isaac Abidde; PF	Albany, GA	Westover Comprehensive High School	6 ft 8 in (2.03 m)	200 lb (91 kg)	08/18/21
Isaac Abidde; PF	Recruit ratings: (NR)				
Overall recruit ranking:
Note: In many cases, Scout, Rivals, 247Sports, On3, and ESPN may conflict in their listings of height and weight.; In these cases, the average was taken. ESPN grades are on a 100-point scale.; Sources: "2021 Team Ranking". Rivals.

== Preseason ==
=== AAC preseason media poll ===
On October 13, The American released the preseason Poll and other preseason awards.

Coaches Poll
Predicted finish	Team	Votes (1st place)
1	Houston	98 (8)
2	Memphis	92 (3)
3	SMU	77
4	Wichita State	76
5	UCF	66
6	Cincinnati	52
7	Tulsa	43
8	Temple	37
T-9	South Florida	25
T-9	Tulane	25
11	East Carolina	14

=== Preseason Awards ===
- AAC Preseason Player of the Year – Tyson Etienne
- AAC Preseason All-Conference First Team – Tyson Etienne

== Roster ==
2021–22 Wichita State Shockers men's basketball team
Players
Coaches

Pos.	#	Name	Height	Weight	Year	Previous school	Hometown
G	0	Dexter Dennis	6 ft 5 in (1.96 m)	210 lb (95 kg)	Sr	Believe Academy	Baker, LA
G	1	Tyson Etienne	6 ft 2 in (1.88 m)	203 lb (92 kg)	Jr	Putnam Science Academy	Englewood, NJ
G	2	Chaunce Jenkins	6 ft 4 in (1.93 m)	175 lb (79 kg)	So	Menchville HS	Newport News, VA
G	3	Craig Porter Jr.	6 ft 2 in (1.88 m)	187 lb (85 kg)	Sr	Vincennes University	Terre Haute, IN
G	4	Ricky Council IV	6 ft 6 in (1.98 m)	204 lb (93 kg)	So	Northern HS	Durham, NC
F	5	Clarence Jackson	6 ft 7 in (2.01 m)	223 lb (101 kg)	Jr	Polk State	Dublin, GA
G	10	Jalen Ricks	6 ft 7 in (2.01 m)	201 lb (91 kg)	Fr	Oak Hill Academy	Sherwood, AR
F	11	Kenny Pohto	6 ft 11 in (2.11 m)	235 lb (107 kg)	Fr	Sunrise Christian Academy	Stockholm, Sweden
G	12	Steele Gaston-Chapman (W)	6 ft 1 in (1.85 m)	185 lb (84 kg)	So	Campus HS	Wichita, KS
F	15	Isaac Abidde	6 ft 9 in (2.06 m)	201 lb (91 kg)	Fr	Westover HS	Albany, GA
G	22	Qua Grant	6 ft 1 in (1.85 m)	195 lb (88 kg)	Sr	West Texas A&M	DeSoto, TX
F	24	Morris Udeze	6 ft 8 in (2.03 m)	245 lb (111 kg)	Sr	Montverde Academy	Houston, TX
F	32	Joe Pleasant	6 ft 7 in (2.01 m)	231 lb (105 kg)	Sr	Abilene Christian	Overland Park, KS

Head coach

- Isaac Brown (Louisiana–Monroe)

Assistant coach(es)

- Tyson Waterman (Winthrop)
- Lou Gudino (Incarnate Word)
- Billy Kennedy (Southeastern Louisiana)

Legend

- (C) Team captain
- (S) Suspended
- (I) Ineligible
- (W) Walk-on
- Injured
- Current redshirt

Roster
Last update: September 21, 2021

== Schedule and results ==
Date time, TV	Rank^{#}	Opponent^{#}	Result	Record	High points	High rebounds	High assists	Site (attendance) city, state
Exhibition
November 1, 2021*; 6:00 p.m.		Missouri Southern	W 90–58	–	15 – Council IV	6 – tied	4 – Grant	Charles Koch Arena (8,040); Wichita, KS
Non-conference regular season
November 9, 2021*; 7:00 p.m., ESPN+		Jacksonville State	W 60–57	1–0	16 – Etienne	8 – Dennis	3 – tied	Charles Koch Arena (8,222); Wichita, KS
November 13, 2021*; 3:00 p.m., ESPN+		South Alabama	W 64–58	2–0	19 – Council IV	12 – Udeze	3 – tied	Charles Koch Arena (8,507); Wichita, KS
November 16, 2021*; 7:00 p.m., ESPN+		Tarleton State; Roman Main Event on-campus game	W 65–51	3–0	15 – Udeze	6 – Udeze	4 – Grant	Charles Koch Arena; Wichita, KS
November 19, 2021*; 9:00 p.m., ESPNU		vs. Arizona; Roman Main Event semifinals	L 78–82 ^{OT}	3–1	27 – Etienne	7 – Porter Jr.	3 – Dennis	T-Mobile Arena; Paradise, NV
November 21, 2021*; 9:00 p.m., ESPN2		vs. UNLV; Roman Main Event consolation	W 74–73	4–1	28 – Etienne	6 – Udeze	4 – Etienne	T-Mobile Arena (8,624); Paradise, NV
November 26, 2021*; 8:00 p.m., SECN		at Missouri	W 61–55	5–1	18 – Etienne	7 – tied	4 – Porter Jr.	Mizzou Arena; Columbia, MO
December 1, 2021*; 7:00 p.m., ESPN+		at Oklahoma State	W 60–51	6–1	17 – Council IV	8 – Porter Jr.	4 – Porter Jr.	Gallagher-Iba Arena (8,134); Stillwater, OK
December 5, 2021*; 5:00 p.m., ESPNU		Kansas State	L 59–65	6–2	19 – Udeze	7 – tied	3 – Etienne	Intrust Bank Arena (14,488); Wichita, KS
December 11, 2021*; 6:00 p.m., ESPN+		Norfolk State	W 71–58	7–2	16 – tied	7 – Udeze	7 – Porter Jr.	Charles Koch Arena; Wichita, KS
December 14, 2021*; 7:00 p.m., ESPN+		Alcorn State	W 82–63	8–2	15 – Udeze	8 – Pohto	6 – Porter Jr.	Charles Koch Arena (8,002); Wichita, KS
December 18, 2021*; 3:00 p.m., ESPN+		North Texas	L 52–62	8–3	17 – Udeze	9 – Council IV	3 – Porter Jr.	Charles Koch Arena (8,277); Wichita, KS
December 22, 2021*; 6:00 p.m., ESPN+		Prairie View A&M	W 102–66	9–3	20 – Etienne	9 – tied	8 – Grant	Charles Koch Arena (8,128); Wichita, KS
AAC regular season
December 29, 2021; 6:00 p.m., ESPN+		at East Carolina	Canceled due to COVID-19					Williams Arena; Greenville, NC
January 1, 2022; 11:00 a.m., CBS		Memphis	L 64–82	9–4 (0–1)	17 – Etienne	7 – Udeze	2 – Qua	Charles Koch Arena (8,751); Wichita, KS
January 8, 2022; 11:00 a.m, CBS		at No. 12 Houston	L 66–76	9–5 (0–2)	11 – Etienne	8 – Jackson	4 – Porter Jr.	Fertitta Center (7,051); Houston, TX
January 12, 2022; 7:00 p.m., ESPN+		Tulane	L 67–68	9–6 (0–3)	20 – Etienne	15 – Council IV	4 – Porter Jr.	Charles Koch Arena (8,089); Wichita, KS
January 16, 2022; 12:00 p.m., ESPN		Cincinnati	L 57–61	9–7 (0–4)	14 – Etienne	11 – Udeze	6 – Etienne	Charles Koch Arena (8,439); Wichita, KS
January 19, 2022; 6:00 p.m., ESPN+		at Temple	Canceled due to COVID-19					Liacouras Center; Philadelphia, PA
January 26, 2022; 7:00 p.m., ESPN+		UCF	W 84–79	10–7 (1–4)	31 – Council IV	6 – Dennis	5 – Porter Jr.	Charles Koch Arena (8,041); Wichita, KS
January 29, 2022; 11:00 a.m., ESPNU		at Tulane	L 66–67	10–8 (1–5)	21 – Etienne	12 – Udeze	4 – Porter Jr.	Devlin Fieldhouse (2,556); New Orleans, LA
February 1, 2022; 8:00 p.m., ESPNU		Tulsa; Rivalry	W 58–48	11–8 (2–5)	11 – Council IV	8 – Udeze	3 – Porter Jr.	Charles Koch Arena (8,132); Wichita, KS
February 3, 2022; 6:00 p.m., ESPN+		at SMU; Previously scheduled for January 23	Canceled due to weather					Moody Coliseum; University Park, TX
February 5, 2022; 5:00 p.m., ESPN2/ESPNU		SMU	W 72–57	12–8 (3–5)	20 – tied	8 – Porter Jr.	4 – tied	Charles Koch Arena (8,285); Wichita, KS
February 8, 2022; 8:00 p.m., ESPNU		at UCF	L 66–71	12–9 (3–6)	26 – Etienne	7 – Etienne	5 – Porter	Addition Financial Arena (4,276); Orlando, FL
February 12, 2022; 7:00 p.m., ESPNU		South Florida	W 73–69	13–9 (4–6)	18 – Council IV	7 – Porter Jr.	6 – Porter Jr.	Charles Koch Arena (8,312); Wichita, KS
February 17, 2022; 6:00 p.m., ESPN2		at Cincinnati	L 76–85	13–10 (4–7)	17 – Council IV	8 – Porter Jr.	6 – Porter Jr.	Fifth Third Arena (9,655); Cincinnati, OH
February 20, 2022; 12:00 p.m., ESPN		No. 14 Houston	L 74–76 ^{2OT}	13–11 (4–8)	17 – tied	10 – tied	4 – tied	Charles Koch Arena (9,070); Wichita, KS
February 27, 2022; 1:30 p.m., ESPN		at Memphis	L 57–81	13–12 (4–9)	11 – Etienne	11 – Udeze	6 – Porter Jr.	FedExForum (14,147); Memphis, TN
March 2, 2022; 8:00 p.m., ESPNU		at Tulsa; Rivalry	W 72–62	14–12 (5–9)	18 – Etienne	8 – Udeze	3 – Etienne	Reynolds Center (3,450); Tulsa, OK
March 5, 2022; 2:00 p.m., ESPNU		East Carolina	W 70–62	15–12 (6–9)	20 – Council IV	10 – Porter Jr.	5 – Grant	Charles Koch Arena (8,177); Wichita, KS
AAC tournament
March 10, 2022; 2:00 p.m., ESPNU	(7)	vs. (10) Tulsa; First round	L 67–73	15–13	19 – Council IV	6 – tied	5 – Etienne	Dickies Arena; Fort Worth, TX
*Non-conference game. ^{#}Rankings from AP poll. (#) Tournament seedings in parentheses. All times are in Central.
