= 2021–22 Temple Owls men's basketball team =

American college basketball season

2021–22 Temple Owls men's basketball
- Conference: American Athletic Conference
- Record: 17–12 (10–7 AAC)
- Head coach: Aaron McKie (3rd season)
- Associate head coach: Monté Ross
- Assistant coaches: Chris Clark; Jimmy Fenerty
- Home arena: Liacouras Center

2021–22 American Athletic Conference men's basketball standings
	Conf.				Overall
Team	W		L	PCT	W		L	PCT
No. 15 Houston †	15	–	3	.833	32	–	6	.842
SMU	13	–	4	.765	24	–	9	.727
Memphis	13	–	5	.722	22	–	11	.667
Temple	10	–	7	.588	17	–	12	.586
Tulane	10	–	8	.556	14	–	15	.483
UCF	9	–	9	.500	18	–	12	.600
Wichita State	6	–	9	.400	15	–	13	.536
Cincinnati	7	–	11	.389	18	–	15	.545
East Carolina	6	–	11	.353	15	–	15	.500
Tulsa	4	–	14	.222	11	–	20	.355
South Florida	3	–	15	.167	8	–	23	.258
† 2022 AAC tournament winner Rankings from AP poll

The 2021–22 Temple Owls men's basketball team represented Temple University during the 2021–22 NCAA Division I men's basketball season. The Owls, led by third-year head coach Aaron McKie, played their home games at the Liacouras Center in Philadelphia, Pennsylvania as a member of the American Athletic Conference. They finished the season 17–12, 10–7 in AAC Play, to finish in 4th place. They lost in the quarterfinals of the AAC tournament to Tulane.

== Previous season ==
In a season limited due to the ongoing COVID-19 pandemic, the Owls finished the 2020–21 season 5–11, 4–10 in AAC play to finish in a tie for eighth place. They lost in the first round of the conference tournament to South Florida.

== Offseason ==
=== Departures ===
Name	Number	Pos.	Height	Weight	Year	Hometown	Reason for departure
J. P. Moorman	4	F	6'7"	210	Senior	Greensboro, NC	Graduate transferred to UC Riverside
Brendan Barry	15	G	6'2"	180	Graduate student	Fair Haven, NJ	Graduate transferred to Dartmouth
De'Vondre Perry	22	F	6'7"	220	Senior	Baltimore, MD	Graduate transferred to Albany
Tim Waddington	24	F	6'5"	195	RS senior	Warrington, PA	Walk-on; graduated

=== Incoming transfers ===
Name	Num	Pos.	Height	Weight	Year	Hometown	Previous school
Emmanuel Okpomo	21	C	6'10"	225	Sophomore	Delta State, Nigeria	Wake Forest

=== 2021 recruiting class ===
College recruiting
Name	Hometown	School	Height	Weight	Commit date
Hysier Miller; PG	Philadelphia, PA	Neumann Goretti High School	6 ft 1 in (1.85 m)	170 lb (77 kg)	Aug 7, 2020
Hysier Miller; PG	Recruit ratings: Rivals: 247Sports: (78)				
Zach Hicks; PF	Camden, NJ	Camden Catholic High School	6 ft 7 in (2.01 m)	185 lb (84 kg)	Sep 4, 2020
Zach Hicks; PF	Recruit ratings: Rivals: 247Sports: (NR)				
Overall recruit ranking: 247Sports: 80
Note: In many cases, Scout, Rivals, 247Sports, On3, and ESPN may conflict in their listings of height and weight.; In these cases, the average was taken. ESPN grades are on a 100-point scale.; Sources: "2021 Team Ranking". Rivals.

== Roster ==
2021–22 Temple Owls men's basketball team
Players
Coaches

Pos.	#	Name	Height	Weight	Year	Previous school	Hometown
G	0	Khalif Battle	6 ft 5 in (1.96 m)	175 lb (79 kg)	Jr	Trenton Catholic Academy; Butler	Hillside, New Jersey
G	1	Damian Dunn	6 ft 5 in (1.96 m)	195 lb (88 kg)	RS So	Meadowcreek High School	Kinston, North Carolina
G	2	Jahlil White	6 ft 7 in (2.01 m)	205 lb (93 kg)	RS Fr	Wildwood Catholic High School	Whitesboro, New Jersey
F	3	Sage Tolbert III	6 ft 8 in (2.03 m)	210 lb (95 kg)	RS Jr	Combine Academy; Southeast Missouri State	New Orleans, Louisiana
G	4	Hysier Miller	6 ft 1 in (1.85 m)	170 lb (77 kg)	Fr	Neumann Goretti High School	Philadelphia, Pennsylvania
F	10	Jake Forrester	6 ft 9 in (2.06 m)	225 lb (102 kg)	Sr	Westtown School; Indiana	Harrisburg, Pennsylvania
F	11	Nick Jourdain	6 ft 8 in (2.03 m)	205 lb (93 kg)	So	Covenant College Prep	Clifton, New Jersey
G	13	Tai Strickland	6 ft 2 in (1.88 m)	180 lb (82 kg)	RS Jr	St. Petersburg High School; Wisconsin	Tampa, Florida
F	14	Arashma Parks	6 ft 9 in (2.06 m)	230 lb (104 kg)	RS Jr	The Phelps School	Cleveland, Ohio
C	21	Emmanuel Okpomoy	6 ft 10 in (2.08 m)	225 lb (102 kg)	So	Wake Forest	Delta State, Nigeria
G	22	Ryan Sayers (W)	6 ft 1 in (1.85 m)	175 lb (79 kg)	Jr	Owen J. Roberts High School	Pottstown, Pennsylvania
G	23	Quincy Ademokoya (S)	6 ft 6 in (1.98 m)	185 lb (84 kg)	So	Dacula High School	Bloomington, Illinois
F	24	Zach Hicks	6 ft 7 in (2.01 m)	185 lb (84 kg)	Fr	Camden Catholic High School	Camden, New Jersey
G	25	Jeremiah Williams	6 ft 5 in (1.96 m)	185 lb (84 kg)	So	Simeon Career Academy	Chicago, Illinois
G	33	Colin Daly (W)	6 ft 4 in (1.93 m)	185 lb (84 kg)	GS	Archbishop John Carroll High School; West Chester	Havertown, Pennsylvania

Head coach

- Aaron McKie (Temple)

Assistant coach(es)

- Monté Ross (Winston-Salem State)
- Chris Clark (Temple)
- Jimmy Fenerty (Dickinson)

Legend

- (C) Team captain
- (S) Suspended
- (I) Ineligible
- (W) Walk-on
- Injured
- Current redshirt

Roster

== Schedule and results ==
Date time, TV	Rank^{#}	Opponent^{#}	Result	Record	High points	High rebounds	High assists	Site (attendance) city, state
Regular season
November 10, 2021*; 7:00 p.m., ESPN+		Maryland Eastern Shore	W 72–49	1–0	22 – Battle	9 – Jourdain	4 – Williams	Liacouras Center (3,486); Philadelphia, PA
November 13, 2021*; 7:00 p.m., ESPN+		USC	L 71–76	1–1	26 – Battle	9 – Jourdain	5 – Williams	Liacouras Center (5,323); Philadelphia, PA
November 18, 2021*; 4:00 p.m., ESPN2		vs. Clemson; Charleston Classic First Round	L 48–75	1–2	16 – Strickland	7 – Dunn	3 – Hicks	TD Arena (3,639); Charleston, SC
November 19, 2021*; 12:00 p.m., ESPNU		vs. Boise State; Charleston Classic Consolation Round	L 62–82	1–3	19 – Battle	7 – Tolbert	2 – 2 tied	TD Arena (3,424); Charleston, SC
November 21, 2021*; 10:30 a.m., ESPNU		vs. Elon; Charleston Classic Consolation – 7th Place Game	W 75–58	2–3	28 – Battle	8 – 3 tied	8 – Williams	TD Arena; Charleston, SC
November 27, 2021*; 7:00 p.m., ESPN+		Delaware	W 75–74	3–3	29 – Battle	5 – Dunn	4 – Williams	Liacouras Center (3,979); Philadelphia, PA
December 1, 2021*; 7:00 p.m., ESPN+		La Salle; Philadelphia Big 5	W 73–57	4–3	22 – Battle	8 – Forrester	6 – Williams	Liacouras Center (4,025); Philadelphia, PA
December 4, 2021*; 4:00 p.m., ESPNU		Penn; Philadelphia Big 5	W 81–72	5–3	27 – Dunn	9 – Forrester	5 – Williams	Liacouras Center (4,421); Philadelphia, PA
December 7, 2021*; 8:00 p.m., SECN+/ESPN+		at Vanderbilt	W 72–68 ^{OT}	6–3	21 – Strickland	8 – Tolbert III	6 – Williams	Memorial Gymnasium (5,239); Nashville, TN
December 11, 2021*; 1:00 p.m., ESPN+		at Saint Joseph's; Philadelphia Big 5/Rivalry	L 49–68	6–4	12 – 2 tied	7 – Dunn	3 – Williams	Hagan Arena (2,400); Philadelphia, PA
December 15, 2021; 7:00 p.m., ESPN2		UCF	L 48–65	6–5 (0–1)	11 – Williams	12 – 2 tied	2 – 2 tied	Liacouras Center (3,002); Philadelphia, PA
December 18, 2021*; 2:00 p.m., ESPN+		Drexel; City 6	Canceled due to COVID-19 issues on Drexel's team					Liacouras Center; Philadelphia, PA
December 22, 2021*; 7:00 p.m., ESPN+		Delaware State	W 85–48	7–5	35 – Hicks	7 – 2 tied	9 – Williams	Liacouras Center (3,122); Philadelphia, PA
December 29, 2021*; 9:00 p.m., FS1		at No. 22 Villanova; Philadelphia Big 5	Canceled due to COVID-19 issues					Finneran Pavilion; Villanova, PA
January 2, 2022; 5:00 p.m., ESPN		No. 12 Houston	L 61–66	7–6 (0–2)	14 – Dunn	7 – White	6 – Williams	Liacouras Center (3,229); Philadelphia, PA
January 5, 2022; 7:00 p.m., ESPN+		at UCF	W 66–62	8–6 (1–2)	17 – White	5 – White	6 – Williams	Addition Financial Arena (3,268); Orlando, FL
January 8, 2022; 12:00 p.m., ESPN+		East Carolina	W 78–75	9–6 (2–2)	33 – Dunn	6 – White	6 – Williams	Liacouras Center (2,774); Philadelphia, PA
January 12, 2022; 7:00 p.m., ESPNU		at Tulsa	W 69–64	10–6 (3–2)	23 – Jourdain	10 – White	4 – Williams	Reynolds Center (2,918); Tulsa, OK
January 19, 2022; 7:00 p.m., ESPN+		Wichita State	Canceled due to COVID-19 issues on Wichita State's team					Liacouras Center; Philadelphia, PA
January 25, 2022; 7:00 p.m., ESPNU		Cincinnati	W 61–58	11–6 (4–2)	18 – Dunn	10 – Strickland	2 – Tied	Liacouras Center (4,752); Philadelphia, PA
January 29, 2022; 6:00 p.m., ESPN+		at SMU	L 61–69	11–7 (4–3)	16 – Dunn	11 – White	4 – White	Moody Coliseum (3,914); University Park, TX
February 2, 2022; 7:00 p.m., ESPN+		at East Carolina	W 71–63	12–7 (5–3)	26 – Dunn	10 – White	6 – Williams	Williams Arena (3,321); Greenville, NC
February 5, 2022; 2:00 p.m., ESPN+		Tulsa	W 67–58	13–7 (6–3)	15 – Jourdain	12 – Jourdain	8 – White	Liacouras Center (5,045); Philadelphia, PA
February 7, 2022; 7:00 p.m., ESPN+		at South Florida; Rescheduled from January 22	L 49–52	13–8 (6–4)	11 – Dunn	9 – Hicks	4 – Dunn	Yuengling Center (2,046); Tampa, FL
February 12, 2022; 3:00 p.m., ESPN+		at Tulane	L 83–92 ^{OT}	13–9 (6–5)	21 – Hicks	8 – White	8 – Miller	Devlin Fieldhouse (1,448); New Orleans, LA
February 16, 2022; 2:00 p.m., ESPNU		SMU	W 64–57	14–9 (7–5)	27 – Strickland	12 – Jourdain	2 – Tied	Liacouras Center (4,035); Philadelphia, PA
February 20, 2022; 2:00 p.m., ESPN2		at Cincinnati	W 75–71	15–9 (8–5)	16 – Hicks	7 – Hicks	3 – Miller	Fifth Third Arena (9,122); Cincinnati, OH
February 24, 2022; 7:00 p.m., ESPN2		at Memphis	L 64–78	15–10 (8–6)	17 – White	5 – White	3 – 2 tied	FedExForum (14,013); Memphis, TN
February 27, 2022; 3:00 p.m., ESPNU		Tulane	W 75–70	16–10 (9–6)	19 – Dunn	12 – White	6 – Miller	Liacouras Center (4,915); Philadelphia, PA
March 3, 2022; 7:00 p.m., ESPN2		at No. 14 Houston	L 46–84	16–11 (9–7)	10 – Jourdain	5 – Strickland	3 – Strickland	Fertitta Center (7,562); Houston, TX
March 6, 2022; 2:00 p.m., ESPN+		South Florida	W 75–47	17–11 (10–7)	27 – Dunn	9 – Dunn	5 – Dunn	Liacouras Center; Philadelphia, PA
AAC Tournament
March 11, 2022; 3:00 p.m., ESPN2	(4)	vs. (5) Tulane; Quarterfinals	L 60–69	17–12	21 – Miller	10 – White	4 – 2 tied	Dickies Arena; Fort Worth, TX
*Non-conference game. ^{#}Rankings from AP Poll. (#) Tournament seedings in parentheses. All times are in Eastern Time.
