= 2021–22 South Florida Bulls men's basketball team =

American college basketball season

2021–22 South Florida Bulls men's basketball
- Conference: American Athletic Conference
- Record: 8–23 (3–15 AAC)
- Head coach: Brian Gregory (5th season)
- Assistant coaches: Larry Dixon; Louis Rowe; Jason Slay
- Home arena: Yuengling Center

2021–22 American Athletic Conference men's basketball standings
	Conf.				Overall
Team	W		L	PCT	W		L	PCT
No. 15 Houston †	15	–	3	.833	32	–	6	.842
SMU	13	–	4	.765	24	–	9	.727
Memphis	13	–	5	.722	22	–	11	.667
Temple	10	–	7	.588	17	–	12	.586
Tulane	10	–	8	.556	14	–	15	.483
UCF	9	–	9	.500	18	–	12	.600
Wichita State	6	–	9	.400	15	–	13	.536
Cincinnati	7	–	11	.389	18	–	15	.545
East Carolina	6	–	11	.353	15	–	15	.500
Tulsa	4	–	14	.222	11	–	20	.355
South Florida	3	–	15	.167	8	–	23	.258
† 2022 AAC tournament winner Rankings from AP poll

The 2021–22 South Florida Bulls men's basketball team represented the University of South Florida during the 2021–22 NCAA Division I men's basketball season. The season marked the 50th basketball season for USF, the ninth as a member of the American Athletic Conference, and the fifth season under head coach Brian Gregory. The Bulls played their home games at Yuengling Center on the university's Tampa, Florida campus. They finished the regular season 8–22, 3–15 in AAC play to finish in last place.

== Previous season ==
In a season limited due to the ongoing COVID-19 pandemic, the Bulls finished the 2020–21 season 9–13, 4–10 in AAC play to finish in a tie for eighth place. They defeated Temple in the first round of the AAC tournament before losing to Wichita State in the quarterfinals.

== Offseason ==
=== Departures ===
Name	Number	Pos.	Height	Weight	Year	Hometown	Reason for departure
David Collins	0	G	6'4"	218	Senior	Youngstown, OH	Graduate transferred to Clemson
Xavier Castaneda	1	G	6'1"	188	Junior	Chicago, IL	Transferred to Xavier
Ezacuras Dawson III	2	G	6'3"	200	RS Junior	Miami, FL	Transferred
Price Oduro	3	F	6'8"	250	RS Junior	Miami, FL	Graduate transferred to Detroit Mercy
Michael Durr	4	F	7'0"	250	Junior	Bradenton, FL	Transferred to Indiana
Rashun Williams	5	F	6'6"	222	Junior	Edison, GA	Transferred to Radford
Alexis Yetna	10	F	6'8"	235	RS Junior	Paris, France	Graduate transferred to Seton Hall
Justin Brown	13	G/F	6'6"	218	RS Senior	Birmingham, AL	Graduate transferred UAB
Madut Akec	22	F	6'7"	208	RS Sophomore	Brandeton, FL	Transferred to Detroit Mercy
Luke Anderson	44	G/F	6'8"	215	RS Freshman	Lakeland, FL	Transferred to Florida Southern

=== Incoming transfers ===
Name	Num	Pos.	Height	Weight	Year	Hometown	Previous school
Javon Greene	1	G	6'4"	195	Graduate Student	McDonough, GA	George Mason
DJ Patrick	3	F	6'6"	200	Sophomore	Power Springs, GA	Triton College
Jalyn McCreary	4	F	6'8"	225	Junior	Marietta, GA	South Carolina
Jake Boggs	5	F	6'7"	200	Junior	Charlotte, NC	UNC Wilmington
Serrel Smith Jr.	10	G	6'4"	175	Senior	St. Petersburg, FL	East Tennessee State
Bayron Matos	14	F	6'9"	260	RS Sophomore	Santo Domingo, DR	New Mexico
Corey Walker Jr.	15	F	6'8"	215	RS Freshman	Jacksonville, FL	Tennessee
Sam Hines Jr.	20	F	6'6"	215	Sophomore	Marietta, GA	Denver

=== Recruiting classes ===
==== 2021 recruiting class ====
College recruiting
Name	Hometown	School	Height	Weight	Commit date
Trey Moss; PG	Windermere, FL	Windermere Prep	6 ft 3 in (1.91 m)	170 lb (77 kg)	Jun 12, 2020
Trey Moss; PG	Recruit ratings: Rivals: 247Sports: (NR)				
Overall recruit ranking:
Note: In many cases, Scout, Rivals, 247Sports, On3, and ESPN may conflict in their listings of height and weight.; In these cases, the average was taken. ESPN grades are on a 100-point scale.; Sources: "2021 Team Ranking". Rivals.

==== 2022 recruiting class ====
College recruiting (2022)
Name	Hometown	School	Height	Weight	Commit date
Ryan Conwell; CG	Indianapolis, IN	Pike High School	6 ft 3 in (1.91 m)	190 lb (86 kg)	Jul 25, 2021
Ryan Conwell; CG	Recruit ratings: No ratings found				
Overall recruit ranking:
Note: In many cases, Scout, Rivals, 247Sports, On3, and ESPN may conflict in their listings of height and weight.; In these cases, the average was taken. ESPN grades are on a 100-point scale.; Sources: "2022 Team Ranking". Rivals.

== Roster ==
2021–22 South Florida Bulls men's basketball team
Players
Coaches

Pos.	#	Name	Height	Weight	Year	Previous school	Hometown
G	1	Javon Greene	6 ft 4 in (1.93 m)	195 lb (88 kg)	GS	George Mason	McDonough, Georgia
G	2	Mark Calleja	6 ft 2 in (1.88 m)	185 lb (84 kg)	Sr	Hudson High School	Hudson, Florida
F	3	DJ Patrick	6 ft 6 in (1.98 m)	200 lb (91 kg)	So	Triton College	Powder Springs, Georgia
F	4	Jalyn McCreary	6 ft 8 in (2.03 m)	225 lb (102 kg)	Jr	South Carolina	Marietta, Georgia
F	5	Jake Boggs	6 ft 7 in (2.01 m)	200 lb (91 kg)	Jr	UNC Wilmington	Charlotte, North Carolina
G	10	Serrel Smith Jr.	6 ft 4 in (1.93 m)	175 lb (79 kg)	Sr	East Tennessee State	St. Petersburg, Florida
G	11	Trey Moss	6 ft 3 in (1.91 m)	180 lb (82 kg)	Fr	Windermere High School	Windermere, Florida
F	14	Bayron Matos	6 ft 9 in (2.06 m)	260 lb (118 kg)	RS So	New Mexico	Santo Domingo, Dominican Republic
F	15	Corey Walker Jr.	6 ft 8 in (2.03 m)	215 lb (98 kg)	RS Fr	Tennessee	Jacksonville, Florida
F	20	Sam Hines Jr.	6 ft 6 in (1.98 m)	215 lb (98 kg)	So	Denver	Marietta, Georgia
G	23	Caleb Murphy	6 ft 4 in (1.93 m)	185 lb (84 kg)	So	Grayson High School	Youngstown, Ohio
G	24	Jamir Chaplin	6 ft 5 in (1.96 m)	200 lb (91 kg)	Jr	Meadowcreek High School	Norcross, Georgia
G	33	Lamont Evans IV (W)	6 ft 0 in (1.83 m)	155 lb (70 kg)	Fr	Blanche Ely High School	Hollywood, Florida
C	54	Russel Tchewa	7 ft 0 in (2.13 m)	280 lb (127 kg)	Jr	Texas Tech	Douala, Cameroon

Head coach

- Brian Gregory (Oakland)

Assistant coach(es)

- Larry Dixon (Johnson C. Smith)
- Louis Rowe (James Madison)
- Jason Slay (West Virginia State)

Legend

- (C) Team captain
- (S) Suspended
- (I) Ineligible
- (W) Walk-on
- Injured
- Current redshirt

Roster

== Schedule and results ==
Date time, TV	Rank^{#}	Opponent^{#}	Result	Record	High points	High rebounds	High assists	Site (attendance) city, state
Exhibition
November 1, 2021*; 7:00 p.m.		Voorhees	W 92–42		17 – McCreary	13 – Matos	4 – Greene	Yuengling Center (313); Tampa, FL
Non-conference regular season
November 9, 2021*; 4:00 p.m., ESPN+		Bethune–Cookman	W 75–54	1–0	16 – Tchewa	8 – Chaplin	4 – Murphy	Yuengling Center; Tampa, FL
November 13, 2021*; 12:00 p.m., ESPN+		Georgia Southern	L 41-53	1–1	18 – Patrick	9 – Tchewa	4 – Moss	Yuengling Center (2,259); Tampa, FL
November 15, 2021*; 7:00 p.m., ESPN+		North Carolina A&T	W 56–54	2–1	12 – Tied	10 – Boggs	6 – Murphy	Yuengling Center (1,931); Tampa, FL
November 19, 2021*; 7:00 p.m., ESPN+		vs. No. 21 Auburn; Tampa Showcase	L 52–58	2–2	19 – Murphy	6 – Murphy	4 – Murphy	Amalie Arena (4,040); Tampa, FL
November 24, 2021*; 7:00 p.m., ESPN+		Hampton	W 58–52	3–2	12 – Murphy	8 – Boggs	4 – Greene	Yuengling Center (2,175); Tampa, FL
November 29, 2021*; 7:00 p.m., ACCN		at Boston College	L 49–64	3–3	11 – Murphy	7 – Tied	3 – Murphy	Conte Forum (3,718); Chestnut Hill, MA
December 3, 2021*; 7:00 p.m., ESPN+		South Carolina State	L 64–65	3–4	18 – Murphy	10 – Tchewa	4 – Murphy	Yuengling Center (2,143); Tampa, FL
December 14, 2021*; 7:00 p.m., ESPN+		Austin Peay	W 60–51	4–4	14 – Greene	8 – Greene	5 – Murphy	Yuengling Center (1,870); Tampa, FL
December 18, 2021*; 1:00 p.m., BSSUN		vs. Florida; Orange Bowl Basketball Classic	L 55–66	4–5	16 – Murphy	5 – Tied	5 – Murphy	FLA Live Arena; Sunrise, FL
December 22, 2021*; 9:30 p.m., ESPNU		vs. BYU; Diamond Head Classic quarterfinals	L 39–54	4–6	9 – Greene	6 – Chaplin	3 – Greene	Stan Sheriff Center; Honolulu, HI
December 23, 2021*; 12:30 a.m., ESPN2		vs. Hawaii; Diamond Head Classic	W 76–69	5–6	18 – Greene	6 – McCreary	6 – Murphy	Stan Sheriff Center (3,880); Honolulu, HI
December 25, 2021*; 1:30 p.m., ESPNU		vs. Wyoming; Diamond Head Classic	L 57–77	5–7	14 – Tied	6 – Chaplin	3 – Greene	Stan Sheriff Center; Honolulu, HI
December 29, 2021*; 7:00 p.m., ESPN+		Mississippi Valley State	Cancelled due to COVID-19					Yuengling Center (–); Tampa, FL
AAC Regular Season
January 5, 2022; 7:00 p.m., ESPN+		No. 12 Houston	L 66–83	5–8 (0–1)	16 – Tied	7 – Chaplin	5 – Chaplin	Yuengling Center (2,291); Tampa, FL
January 8, 2022; 4:00 p.m., ESPNU		at Tulane	L 54–68	5–9 (0–2)	17 – Chaplin	9 – Greene	4 – Murphy	Devlin Fieldhouse (927); New Orleans, LA
January 12, 2022; 7:00 p.m., ESPN+		at SMU	L 65–77	5–10 (0–3)	17 – Chaplin	6 – Tchewa	3 – McCreary	Moody Coliseum (3,021); University Park, TX
January 15, 2022; 7:00 p.m., ESPN+		UCF; War on I-4	W 75–51	6–10 (1–3)	19 – Greene	9 – Greene	3 – Murphy	Yuengling Center (3,072); Tampa, FL
January 18, 2022; 8:00 p.m., ESPN+		at No. 10 Houston	L 55–74	6–11 (1–4)	19 – Patrick	8 – Tied	8 – Murphy	Fertitta Center (6,959); Houston, TX
January 26, 2022; 7:00 p.m., ESPN+		SMU	L 54–74	6–12 (1–5)	14 – Murphy	6 – Greene	2 – Tied	Yuengling Center (1,849); Tampa, FL
January 29, 2022; 8:00 p.m., ESPN+		at Tulsa	L 45–76	6–13 (1–6)	13 – Murphy	7 – Tchewa	2 – Chaplin	Reynolds Center (3,012); Tulsa, OK
February 3, 2022; 7:00 p.m., ESPN+		at UCF; War on I-4	L 49–68	6–14 (1–7)	13 – Tchewa	6 – Chaplin	7 – Greene	Addition Financial Arena (6,722); Orlando, FL
February 7, 2022; 7:00 p.m., ESPN+		Temple; Rescheduled from January 22	W 52–49	7–14 (2–7)	14 – Chaplin	4 – Tied	3 – Tied	Yuengling Center (2,046); Tampa, FL
February 9, 2022; 7:00 p.m., ESPN+		Cincinnati	L 59–70	7–15 (2–8)	12 – Hines Jr.	6 – Chaplin	5 – Greene	Yuengling Center (2,011); Tampa, FL
February 12, 2022; 8:00 p.m., ESPNU		at Wichita State	L 69–73	7–16 (2–9)	15 – Greene	11 – Walker Jr.	5 – Hines Jr.	Charles Koch Arena (8,312); Wichita, KS
February 15, 2022; 7:00 p.m., ESPN+		Tulane	L 57–76	7–17 (2–10)	17 – Smith Jr.	10 – Tchewa	3 – Tied	Yuengling Center (2,078); Tampa, FL
February 17, 2022; 7:00 p.m., ESPN+		East Carolina; Previously scheduled for Jan. 1	L 57–65	7–18 (2–11)	18 – Smith Jr.	6 – Walker Jr.	6 – Murphy	Yuengling Center (2,034); Tampa, FL
February 19, 2022; 12:00 p.m., ESPNU		Tulsa	L 57–65	7–19 (2–12)	15 – Greene	7 – Tchewa	3 – Murphy	Yuengling Center (2,085); Tampa, FL
February 23, 2022; 7:00 p.m., ESPN+		at East Carolina	L 60–64	7–20 (2–13)	18 – Tchewa	10 – Tchewa	4 – Greene	Williams Arena (3,193); Greenville, NC
February 26, 2022; 7:00 p.m., ESPN+		at Cincinnati	W 56–54	8–20 (3–13)	13 – Tchewa	8 – Walker Jr.	3 – Murphy	Fifth Third Arena (0); Cincinnati, OH
March 3, 2022; 9:00 p.m., ESPNU		Memphis	L 64–73	8–21 (3–14)	13 – Tchewa	11 – Walker Jr.	8 – Murphy	Yuengling Center (3,186); Tampa, FL
March 6, 2022; 2:00 p.m., ESPN+		at Temple	L 47–75	8–22 (3–15)	12 – Hines Jr.	7 – Tchewa	2 – Tied	Liacouras Center; Philadelphia, PA
AAC tournament
March 10, 2022; 7:00 p.m., ESPNU	(11)	vs. (6) UCF; First Round	L 58–60	8–23	15 – Murphy	10 – Tchewa	8 – Murphy	Dickies Arena; Fort Worth, TX
*Non-conference game. ^{#}Rankings from AP Poll. (#) Tournament seedings in parentheses. All times are in Eastern Time.
