= 2021–22 UCF Knights men's basketball team =

American college basketball season

2021–22 UCF Knights men's basketball
- Conference: American Athletic Conference
- Record: 18–12 (9–9 AAC)
- Head coach: Johnny Dawkins (6th season)
- Assistant coaches: Kevin Norris (6th season); Robbie Laing (6th season); Mamadou N'Diaye (1st season)
- Home arena: Addition Financial Arena

2021–22 American Athletic Conference men's basketball standings
	Conf.				Overall
Team	W		L	PCT	W		L	PCT
No. 15 Houston †	15	–	3	.833	32	–	6	.842
SMU	13	–	4	.765	24	–	9	.727
Memphis	13	–	5	.722	22	–	11	.667
Temple	10	–	7	.588	17	–	12	.586
Tulane	10	–	8	.556	14	–	15	.483
UCF	9	–	9	.500	18	–	12	.600
Wichita State	6	–	9	.400	15	–	13	.536
Cincinnati	7	–	11	.389	18	–	15	.545
East Carolina	6	–	11	.353	15	–	15	.500
Tulsa	4	–	14	.222	11	–	20	.355
South Florida	3	–	15	.167	8	–	23	.258
† 2022 AAC tournament winner Rankings from AP poll

The 2021–22 UCF Knights men's basketball team represented the University of Central Florida during the 2021–22 NCAA Division I men's basketball season. The Knights competed as members of the American Athletic Conference. The Knights, in the program's 53rd season of basketball, were led by sixth-year head coach Johnny Dawkins and played their home games at the Addition Financial Arena on the university's main campus in Orlando, Florida. They finished the season 18–12, 9–9 in AAC Play to finish in 6th place. They defeated South Florida in the first round of the AAC Tournament before losing in the quarterfinals to Memphis.

== Previous season ==
The Knights finished the 2020–21 season 10–11 overall and 8–10 in AAC play to finish in sixth place. They defeated East Carolina in the first round of the AAC tournament before losing to Memphis in the quarterfinals.

== Offseason ==
=== Departures ===
Name	Number	Pos.	Height	Weight	Year	Hometown	Reason for departure
Josh Kaplan	0	G	6'0"	160	Junior	Merrick, NY	Walk-on; didn't return
Avery Diggs	5	C	6'11"	245	Senior	Brandon, FL	Graduate transferred to Chatttanoga
Xavier Grant	11	G	6'3"	185	Junior	Fort Lauderdale, FL	Walk-on; didn't return
Issac Ward	15	G	6'0"	185	Freshman	Tampa, FL	Transferred to Spring Hill
Moses Bol	33	C	7'1"	230	RS junior	Wau, South Sudan	Graduate transferred to Milwaukee

=== Incoming transfers ===
Name	Num	Pos.	Height	Weight	Year	Hometown	Previous school
Tyem Freeman	11	G	6'6"	210	RS sophomore	Springfield, IL	Indian Hills CC
Cheikh Mbacke Diong	34	F	6'11"	235	RS senior	Dakar, Senegal	UNLV

=== 2021 recruiting class ===
College recruiting
Name	Hometown	School	Height	Weight	Commit date
Darius Johnson #26 PG	Boyds, MD	Episcopal High School	6 ft 0 in (1.83 m)	180 lb (82 kg)	Oct 1, 2020
Darius Johnson #26 PG	Recruit ratings: Scout: Rivals: 247Sports: ESPN: (81)				
P. J. Edwards; SG	Springfield, IL	Liberty Heights Athletic Institute	6 ft 5 in (1.96 m)	200 lb (91 kg)	Dec 14, 2020
P. J. Edwards; SG	Recruit ratings: Scout: Rivals: 247Sports: ESPN: (NR)				
Ed'Xavior Rhodes; SG	Dallas, TX	Skyline High School	6 ft 8 in (2.03 m)	205 lb (93 kg)	Apr 19, 2021
Ed'Xavior Rhodes; SG	Recruit ratings: Scout: Rivals: 247Sports: ESPN: (NR)				
Overall recruit ranking:
Note: In many cases, Scout, Rivals, 247Sports, On3, and ESPN may conflict in their listings of height and weight.; In these cases, the average was taken. ESPN grades are on a 100-point scale.; Sources: "2021 Team Ranking". Rivals.

=== 2022 recruiting class ===
College recruiting (2022)
Name	Hometown	School	Height	Weight	Commit date
Taylor Hendricks #13 C	Fort Lauderdale, FL	Calvary Christian Academy	6 ft 9 in (2.06 m)	210 lb (95 kg)	Mar 21, 2021
Taylor Hendricks #13 C	Recruit ratings: Scout: Rivals: 247Sports: ESPN: (85)				
Tyler Hendricks #50 SG	Fort Lauderdale, FL	Calvary Christian Academy	6 ft 4 in (1.93 m)	185 lb (84 kg)	Mar 21, 2021
Tyler Hendricks #50 SG	Recruit ratings: Scout: Rivals: 247Sports: ESPN: (79)				
Overall recruit ranking:
Note: In many cases, Scout, Rivals, 247Sports, On3, and ESPN may conflict in their listings of height and weight.; In these cases, the average was taken. ESPN grades are on a 100-point scale.; Sources: "2022 Team Ranking". Rivals.

== Roster ==
2021–22 UCF Knights men's basketball team
Players
Coaches

Pos.	#	Name	Height	Weight	Year	Previous school	Hometown
G	0	Darius Johnson	6 ft 1 in (1.85 m)	190 lb (86 kg)	Fr	Episcopal High School	Boyds, Maryland
G	1	Tony Johnson Jr.	6 ft 3 in (1.91 m)	185 lb (84 kg)	Jr	The Skill Factory	Eufaula, Alabama
G	2	Darius Perry	6 ft 2 in (1.88 m)	185 lb (84 kg)	GS	Louisville	Marietta, Georgia
F	3	Isaiah Adams	6 ft 6 in (1.98 m)	210 lb (95 kg)	Fr	Paxon School for Advanced Studies	Jacksonville, Florida
F	4	Jamille Reynolds	6 ft 10 in (2.08 m)	285 lb (129 kg)	So	Lakewood Senior High School	St. Petersburg, Florida
G	5	P. J. Edwards	6 ft 4 in (1.93 m)	200 lb (91 kg)	Fr	Liberty Heights Athletic Institute	Springfield, Illinois
G	10	Levy Renaud (W)	6 ft 2 in (1.88 m)	185 lb (84 kg)	Sr	NSU University School	Fort Lauderdale, Florida
G	11	Tyem Freeman	6 ft 6 in (1.98 m)	210 lb (95 kg)	RS So	Indian Hills CC	Springfield, Missouri
F	12	Ed'Xavior Rhodes	6 ft 9 in (2.06 m)	210 lb (95 kg)	Fr	Skyline	Dallas, Texas
G	13	Brandon Mahan	6 ft 5 in (1.96 m)	205 lb (93 kg)	GS	Texas A&M	Birmingham, Alabama
F	20	Sean Mobley	6 ft 8 in (2.03 m)	235 lb (107 kg)	RS Sr	VCU	Orlando, Florida
F	21	C. J. Walker	6 ft 8 in (2.03 m)	205 lb (93 kg)	Jr	Oregon	Sanford, Florida
G	22	Darin Green Jr.	6 ft 5 in (1.96 m)	190 lb (86 kg)	Jr	Wharton High School	Charlotte, North Carolina
G	24	Dre Fuller Jr.	6 ft 5 in (1.96 m)	215 lb (98 kg)	RS Jr	Admiral Farragut Academy	Fayetteville, North Carolina
F	25	Ryan Anders (W)	6 ft 6 in (1.98 m)	235 lb (107 kg)	Sr	Wharton High School	Tampa, Florida
F	34	Cheikh Mbacke Diong	6 ft 11 in (2.11 m)	235 lb (107 kg)	RS Sr	UNLV	Dakar, Senegal

Head coach

- Johnny Dawkins (Duke)

Assistant coach(es)

- Kevin Norris (Miami (FL))
- Robbie Laing (Troy)
- Mamadou N'Diaye (Auburn)

Legend

- (C) Team captain
- (S) Suspended
- (I) Ineligible
- (W) Walk-on
- Injured
- Current redshirt

Roster

== Schedule and results ==
Date time, TV	Rank^{#}	Opponent^{#}	Result	Record	High points	High rebounds	High assists	Site (attendance) city, state
Regular season
November 10, 2021*; 7:00 p.m., ESPN+		Robert Morris	W 69–59	1–0	18 – Perry	8 – Mbacke Diong	4 – Perry	Addition Financial Arena (4,869); Orlando, FL
November 13, 2021*; 1:00 p.m., ACCNX		at Miami (FL)	W 95–89	2–0	23 – Green Jr.	11 – Walker	6 – Perry	Watsco Center (2,950); Coral Gables, FL
November 16, 2021*; 7:00 p.m., ESPN+		Jacksonville	W 63–54	3–0	11 – Green Jr.	6 – Fuller Jr.	6 – Perry	Addition Financial Arena (3,937); Orlando, FL
November 20, 2021*; 2:00 p.m., ESPN+		at Evansville	W 75–59	4–0	17 – Green Jr.	6 – Adams	2 – Tied	Ford Center (3,233); Evansville, IN
November 27, 2021*; 2:00 p.m., ESPN+		Oklahoma	L 62–65	4–1	17 – Green Jr.	7 – Mbacke Diong	8 – Perry	Addition Financial Arena (4,198); Orlando, FL
December 1, 2021*; 8:00 p.m., SECN+		at No. 21 Auburn	L 68–85	4–2	18 – Perry	7 – Walker	4 – Perry	Auburn Arena (9,121); Auburn, AL
December 5, 2021*; 2:00 p.m., ESPN+		Bethune–Cookman	W 81–45	5–2	18 – Green Jr.	9 – Diong	6 – Perry	Addition Financial Arena (3,804); Orlando, FL
December 11, 2021*; 2:00 p.m., ESPN+		North Carolina A&T	W 83–68	6–2	18 – Green Jr.	4 – Walker	6 – Perry	Addition Financial Arena (3,507); Orlando, FL
December 15, 2021; 7:00 p.m., ESPN2		at Temple	W 65–48	7–2 (1–0)	18 – Mahan	4 – Walker	3 – Tied	Liacouras Center (3,002); Philadelphia, PA
December 18, 2021*; 3:30 p.m., BSSUN		vs. Florida State; Orange Bowl Basketball Classic	Canceled due to COVID-19					FLA Live Arena; Sunrise, FL
December 22, 2021*; 7:00 p.m., ESPN+		North Alabama	W 75–64	8–2	15 – Perry	9 – Diong	9 – Perry	Addition Financial Arena (3,273); Orlando, FL
December 30, 2021*; 7:00 p.m., ESPN2		Michigan	W 85–71	9–2	27 – Green	7 – Tied	7 – Perry	Addition Financial Arena (9,358); Orlando, FL
January 2, 2022; 2:00 p.m., ESPNU		at SMU	L 60–72	9–3 (1–1)	17 – Mahan	8 – Walker	2 – Johnson	Moody Coliseum (3,267); University Park, TX
January 5, 2022; 7:00 p.m., ESPN+		Temple	L 62–66	9–4 (1–2)	14 – Perry	9 – Walker	4 – Perry	Addition Financial Arena (3,268); Orlando, FL
January 12, 2022; 7:00 p.m., ESPN+		Memphis	W 74–64	10–4 (2–2)	20 – Green Jr.	7 – Walker	5 – Perry	Additional Financial Arena (6,163); Orlando, FL
January 15, 2022; 7:00 p.m., ESPN+		at South Florida; War on I-4	L 51–75	10–5 (2–3)	9 – Walker	4 – Walker	3 – Johnson	Yuengling Center (3,072); Tampa, FL
January 18, 2022; 7:00 p.m., ESPN+		at East Carolina	W 92–85 ^{OT}	11–5 (3–3)	19 – Perry	6 – Adams	8 – Perry	Williams Arena (4,167); Greenville, NC
January 22, 2022; 2:00 p.m., ESPNU		Tulane	W 68–66	12–5 (4–3)	17 – Johnson	10 – Mbacke Diong	4 – Johnson	Addition Financial Arena (4,508); Orlando, FL
January 26, 2022; 8:00 p.m., ESPN+		at Wichita State	L 79–84	12–6 (4–4)	20 – Mahan	13 – Mahan	6 – Perry	Charles Koch Arena (8,041); Wichita, KS
January 29, 2022; 8:00 p.m., ESPN2		No. 7 Houston	L 49–63	12–7 (4–5)	14 – Green Jr.	7 – Mahan	6 – Perry	Addition Financial Arena (8,142); Orlando, FL
February 3, 2022; 7:00 p.m., ESPN+		South Florida; War on I-4	W 68–49	13–7 (5–5)	23 – Green Jr.	7 – Mbacke Diong	5 – Perry	Addition Financial Arena (6,722); Orlando, FL
February 5, 2022; 8:00 p.m., ESPN2		at Memphis	L 60–88	13–8 (5–6)	11 – Tied	8 – Diong	5 – Johnson	FedExForum (15,280); Memphis, TN
February 8, 2022; 9:00 p.m., ESPNU		Wichita State	W 71–66	14–8 (6–6)	19 – Mahan	9 – Tied	5 – Johnson	Addition Financial Arena (4,276); Orlando, FL
February 14, 2022; 7:00 p.m., ESPNU		Tulsa; Rescheduled from January 8	W 76–67	15–8 (7–6)	14 – Johnson	6 – Tied	5 – Johnson	Addition Financial Arena (4,077); Orlando, FL
February 17, 2022; 9:00 p.m., ESPN2		at No. 14 Houston	L 52–70	15–9 (7–7)	12 – Tied	7 – Walker	5 – Johnson	Fertitta Center (6,957); Houston, TX
February 20, 2022; 2:00 p.m., ESPN+		East Carolina	W 69–66	16–9 (8–7)	19 – Green Jr.	8 – Johnson	6 – Johnson	Addition Financial Arena (4,427); Orlando, FL
February 23, 2022; 9:00 p.m., ESPNU		Cincinnati	W 75–61	17–9 (9–7)	13 – Walker	7 – Johnson	5 – Tied	Addition Financial Arena (5,102); Orlando, FL
March 3, 2022; 8:00 p.m., ESPN+		at Tulane	L 67–82	17–10 (9–8)	15 – Johnson	16 – Walker	5 – Perry	Devlin Fieldhouse (1,569); New Orleans, LA
March 6, 2022; 2:00 p.m., ESPNU		at Tulsa	L 72–73	17–11 (9–9)	19 – Tied	8 – Diong	9 – Johnson	Reynolds Center; Tulsa, OK
AAC tournament
March 10, 2022; 7:00 p.m., ESPNU	(6)	vs. (11) South Florida; First Round	W 60–58	18–11	13 – Perry	7 – Walker	4 – Tied	Dickies Arena; Fort Worth, TX
March 11, 2022; 9:00 p.m., ESPNU	(6)	vs. (3) Memphis; Quarterfinals	L 69–85	18–12	23 – Perry	5 – Tied	7 – Tied	Dickies Arena; Fort Worth, TX
*Non-conference game. ^{#}Rankings from AP Poll. (#) Tournament seedings in parentheses. All times are in Eastern Time.
