= 2021–22 Alcorn State Braves basketball team =

American college basketball season

2021–22 Alcorn State Braves basketball
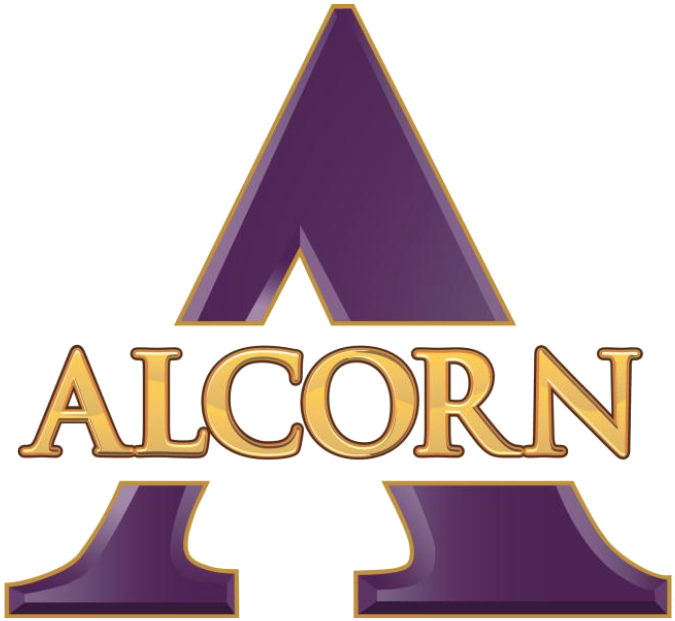

SWAC regular-season champions

NIT, first round
- Conference: Southwestern Athletic Conference
- Record: 17–17 (14–4 SWAC)
- Head coach: Landon Bussie (2nd season)
- Assistant coaches: Marco Borne (1st season); Tyler Adams (2nd season); Gary Smith (1st season)
- Home arena: Davey Whitney Complex

2021–22 SWAC men's basketball standings
	Conf.				Overall
Team	W		L	PCT	W		L	PCT
Alcorn State	14	–	4	.778	17	–	17	.500
Texas Southern †	13	–	5	.722	19	–	13	.594
Southern	12	–	6	.667	17	–	14	.548
Florida A&M	11	–	7	.611	13	–	17	.433
Alabama A&M	10	–	8	.556	12	–	18	.400
Grambling State	9	–	9	.500	12	–	20	.375
Jackson State	9	–	9	.500	11	–	19	.367
Prairie View A&M	8	–	10	.444	8	–	19	.296
Alabama State	8	–	10	.444	9	–	21	.300
Bethune–Cookman	7	–	11	.389	9	–	21	.300
Arkansas–Pine Bluff	5	–	13	.278	7	–	24	.226
Mississippi Valley State	2	–	16	.111	2	–	26	.071
† 2022 SWAC tournament winner

The 2021–22 Alcorn State Braves basketball team represented Alcorn State University in the 2021–22 NCAA Division I men's basketball season. The Braves, led by second-year head coach Landon Bussie, played their home games at the Davey Whitney Complex in Lorman, Mississippi as members of the Southwestern Athletic Conference (SWAC).

The Braves finished the season 17–17, 14–4 in SWAC play, to finish as conference regular-season champions. In the SWAC tournament, they defeated Prairie View A&M and Alabama A&M, before falling to Texas Southern in the SWAC championship game. As a regular-season conference champion who failed to win their conference tournament title, they received an automatic bid to the NIT, where they lost in the first round to Texas A&M.

== Previous season ==
The Braves finished the 2020–21 season 6–13, 6–7 in SWAC play, to finish in sixth place in conference. They lost in the first round of the SWAC tournament to Texas Southern.

== Offseason ==
=== Departures ===
Departures
Name	Pos.	Height	Weight	Year	Hometown	Notes
Mark Carter	F	6' 6"	195	Senior	Los Angeles, CA	Graduated
Tyree Corbett	F	6' 7"	180	Junior	Philadelphia, PA	Transferred to Coppin State
Troymain Crosby	G/F	6' 4"	200	Senior	Laurel, MS	Graduated
Anthony Fairley	F	6' 8"	190	Senior	Mobile, AL	Transferred to Miles College
Malik Hardmon	F	6' 6"	205	Junior	Chicago, IL	
Kurk Lee	G	5' 10"	150	Redshirt junior	Baltimore, MD	
Myson Lowe	G	5' 10"	165	Freshman	Smyrna, GA	Transferred to Wallace State Community College
Arne Morris	G	6' 3"	190	Senior	Raleigh, NC	Graduated
David Pierce III	G	6' 3"	215	Junior	St. Petersburg, FL	
KJ Riley	G/F	6' 4"	190	Junior	Greenville, MS	Transferred to Truett McConnell
Jacoby Ross	G	5' 10"	165	Senior	New Orleans, LA	Transferred to Lindenwood
Kobe Wilson	F/C	6' 9"	220	Redshirt senior	Kennesaw, GA	Graduated

=== Incoming transfers ===
Transfers
Name	Pos.	Height	Weight	Year	Hometown	Previous school
Darrious Agnew	F	6' 8"	230	Graduate student	Starkville, MS	Southeast Missouri State
Dominic "DJ" Brewton	G	6' 4"	191	Junior	Cincinnati, OH	Vincennes University
Sam'zha Hart	F	6' 7"	211	Junior	Dallas, TX	Stephen F. Austin
Lenell Henry	F	6' 8"	215	Graduate student	Chicago, IL	Prairie View A&M
Paul King	G	6' 0"	179	Sophomore	Monroe, LA	Bossier Parish Community College
LaDarius Marshall	F	6' 7"	228	Junior	Jackson, MS	New Orleans
Marco Morency	G	6' 3"	175	Junior	Mount Vernon, NY	Louisiana–Monroe
Dontrell "DJ" McQuarter	F	6' 7"	181	Junior	Baton Rouge, LA	Rider
Oddyst Walker	G	6' 2"	185	Junior	Baton Rouge, LA	Stephen F. Austin

=== Recruiting class ===
College recruiting information
Name	Hometown	School	Height	Weight	Commit date
Devin Carter; PG	Edwards, MS	Florence High School	6 ft 2 in (1.88 m)	165 lb (75 kg)	
Devin Carter; PG	Recruit ratings: Scout: Rivals: 247Sports: (NR)				
Jordin Farrell; PG	New Orleans, LA	Crescent City Christian School	6 ft 2 in (1.88 m)	189 lb (86 kg)	
Jordin Farrell; PG	Recruit ratings: (NR)				
Keondre Montgomery; SF	Jackson, MS	Forest Hill High School	6 ft 7 in (2.01 m)	200 lb (91 kg)	
Keondre Montgomery; SF	Recruit ratings: Scout: Rivals: 247Sports: (NR)				
Mike Pajeaud; PG	New Orleans, LA	George Washington Carver High School	6 ft 2 in (1.88 m)	180 lb (82 kg)	Jul 8, 2021
Mike Pajeaud; PG	Recruit ratings: Scout: Rivals: (NR)				
Overall recruit ranking:
Note: In many cases, Scout, Rivals, 247Sports, On3, and ESPN may conflict in their listings of height and weight.; In these cases, the average was taken. ESPN grades are on a 100-point scale.; Sources: "2021 Team Ranking". Rivals.

== Roster ==
2021–22 Alcorn State Braves men's basketball team
Players
Coaches

Pos.	#	Name	Height	Weight	Year	Hometown
C	0	Lenell Henry	6 ft 8 in (2.03 m)	215 lb (98 kg)	GS	Chicago, IL
F	1	Dontrell McQuarter	6 ft 7 in (2.01 m)	181 lb (82 kg)	Jr	Baton Rouge, LA
G	2	Byron Joshua	5 ft 11 in (1.8 m)	160 lb (73 kg)	Fr	New Orleans, LA
G	3	Justin Thomas	6 ft 0 in (1.83 m)	185 lb (84 kg)	GS	Indianapolis, IN
C	4	Darrious Agnew	6 ft 8 in (2.03 m)	230 lb (104 kg)	GS	Starkville, MS
F	5	Keondre Montgomery	6 ft 7 in (2.01 m)	200 lb (91 kg)	Fr	Jackson, MS
G	10	Paul King	6 ft 0 in (1.83 m)	179 lb (81 kg)	So	Monroe, LA
G	11	Oddyst Walker	6 ft 2 in (1.88 m)	185 lb (84 kg)	Jr	Baton Rouge, LA
G	12	Dekedran Thorn	6 ft 4 in (1.93 m)	187 lb (85 kg)	Jr	Houston, TX
G	13	Marco Morency	6 ft 3 in (1.91 m)	175 lb (79 kg)	Jr	Mount Vernon, NY
G	15	Dominic Brewton	6 ft 4 in (1.93 m)	191 lb (87 kg)	Jr	Cincinnati, OH
G	20	Jordin Farrell (W)	6 ft 2 in (1.88 m)	189 lb (86 kg)	Sr	New Orleans, LA
F	21	LaDarius Marshall	6 ft 11 in (2.11 m)	230 lb (104 kg)	Jr	Jackson, MS
F	22	Sama'zha Hart	6 ft 7 in (2.01 m)	211 lb (96 kg)	Jr	Dallas, TX
G	23	Devin Carter	6 ft 2 in (1.88 m)	160 lb (73 kg)	Fr	Edwards, MS
G	24	Mike Pajeaud (W)	6 ft 1 in (1.85 m)	180 lb (82 kg)	Fr	New Orleans, LA
G	55	Tajah Fraley	6 ft 4 in (1.93 m)	195 lb (88 kg)	Jr	Atlanta, GA

Head coach

- Landon Bussie (XULA)

Assistant coach(es)

- Marco Borne (Dillard)
- Tyler Adams (Georgetown)
- Gary Smith (XULA)

Legend

- (C) Team captain
- (S) Suspended
- (I) Ineligible
- (W) Walk-on
- Injured
- Current redshirt

Roster
Last update: June 30, 2024

== Schedule and results ==
Date time, TV	Rank^{#}	Opponent^{#}	Result	Record	High points	High rebounds	High assists	Site (attendance) city, state
Non-conference regular season
November 9, 2021*; 2:00 p.m.		at Washington State	L 67–85	0–1	10 – King	5 – Agnew	3 – Thomas	Beasley Coliseum (1,023); Pullman, WA
November 10, 2021*; 9:00 p.m.		at Seattle	L 66–69	0–2	17 – Montgomery	8 – Agnew	7 – Joshua	Redhawk Center (503); Seattle, WA
November 13, 2021*; 7:00 p.m.		at Portland	L 58–62	0–3	20 – Joshua	12 – Henry	2 – King	Chiles Center (1,092); Portland, OR
November 15, 2021*; 8:00 p.m.		at No. 1 Gonzaga	L 57–84	0–4	13 – Montgomery	4 – 2 tied	4 – Joshua	McCarthey Athletic Center (6,000); Spokane, WA
November 26, 2021*; 7:00 p.m.		at Southern Illinois	L 59–62	0–5	15 – Henry	10 – Henry	4 – Thomas	Banterra Center (4,190); Carbondale, IL
November 28, 2021*; 1:00 p.m.		at Milwaukee	W 61–57	1–5	18 – King	12 – Henry	6 – Thomas	UW–Milwaukee Panther Arena (1,604); Milwaukee, WI
December 4, 2021*; 1:00 p.m.		at Tulane	L 64–85	1–6	11 – 2 tied	11 – Henry	7 – Thomas	Devlin Fieldhouse (1,033); New Orleans, LA
December 6, 2021*; 7:00 p.m.		at No. 14 Houston	L 45–77	1–7	8 – Brewton	7 – McQuarter	1 – 4 tied	Fertitta Center (6,649); Houston, TX
December 14, 2021*; 7:00 p.m.		at Wichita State	L 63–82	1–8	16 – Walker	7 – Agnew	6 – Joshua	Charles Koch Arena (8,002); Wichita, KS
December 16, 2021*; 7:00 p.m.		at Tulsa	L 62–83	1–9	21 – King	6 – Agnew	6 – Joshua	Reynolds Center (2,556); Tulsa, OK
December 20, 2021*; 6:00 p.m., ESPN+		at No. 1 Baylor	L 57–94	1–10	19 – Brewton	6 – Agnew	3 – 3 tied	Ferrell Center (6,923); Waco, TX
December 22, 2021*; 7:00 p.m.		at Oklahoma	L 48–72	1–11	13 – King	7 – Agnew	3 – Joshua	Lloyd Noble Center (5,938); Norman, OK
December 29, 2021*; 7:00 p.m.		at Minnesota	Canceled due to COVID-19 issues at Alcorn State					Williams Arena; Minneapolis, MN
SWAC regular season
January 5, 2022; 7:30 p.m.		at Jackson State	W 65–50	2–11 (1–0)	22 – Henry	7 – Thomas	3 – Thomas	Williams Assembly Center (717); Jackson, MS
January 8, 2022; 3:00 p.m.		at Alabama A&M	W 78–71	3–11 (2–0)	27 – Montgomery	5 – 4 tied	5 – Thomas	Elmore Gymnasium (956); Normal, AL
January 10, 2022; 7:30 p.m.		at Alabama State	W 70–60	4–11 (3–0)	15 – King	7 – Agnew	6 – Thomas	Dunn–Oliver Acadome (400); Montgomery, AL
January 15, 2022; 3:00 p.m.		Texas Southern	W 73–72	5–11 (4–0)	26 – Thomas	8 – Thomas	5 – Thomas	Davey Whitney Complex (312); Lorman, MS
January 17, 2022; 7:30 p.m.		Prairie View A&M	L 73–74	5–12 (4–1)	21 – Agnew	9 – Agnew	8 – Thomas	Davey Whitney Complex (264); Lorman, MS
January 22, 2022; 3:00 p.m.		at Florida A&M	L 68–70	5–13 (4–2)	17 – Montgomery	5 – 4 tied	4 – Brewton	Al Lawson Center (2,169); Tallahassee, FL
January 24, 2022; 7:30 p.m.		at Bethune–Cookman	W 70–67	6–13 (5–2)	16 – 2 tied	6 – 2 tied	4 – 2 tied	Moore Gymnasium (366); Daytona Beach, FL
January 29, 2022; 3:00 p.m.		Southern	W 68–64	7–13 (6–2)	15 – Montgomery	8 – Brewton	3 – Joshua	Davey Whitney Complex (650); Lorman, MS
January 31, 2022; 7:30 p.m.		Grambling State	L 73–80	7–14 (6–3)	16 – Brewton	7 – Montgomery	6 – Thomas	Davey Whitney Complex (1,191); Lorman, MS
February 5, 2022; 3:00 p.m.		at Arkansas–Pine Bluff	W 70–64	8–14 (7–3)	15 – Agnew	9 – Montgomery	2 – Thomas	K. L. Johnson Complex (2,149); Pine Bluff, AR
February 7, 2022; 3:00 p.m.		at Mississippi Valley State	W 79–71	9–14 (8–3)	16 – 2 tied	7 – Agnew	2 – 2 tied	Harrison HPER Complex (3,829); Itta Bena, MS
February 12, 2022; 3:00 p.m.		Bethune–Cookman	L 63–71 ^{OT}	9–15 (8–4)	19 – Thomas	9 – Henry	4 – Thomas	Davey Whitney Complex (0); Lorman, MS
February 14, 2022; 7:30 p.m.		Florida A&M	W 68–56	10–15 (9–4)	14 – Agnew	8 – McQuarter	7 – Thomas	Davey Whitney Complex (440); Lorman, MS
February 19, 2022; 3:00 p.m.		Jackson State	W 61–60	11–15 (10–4)	11 – Joshua	8 – Joshua	2 – Thomas	Davey Whitney Complex (3,500); Lorman, MS
February 26, 2022; 3:00 p.m.		at Prairie View A&M	W 72–69	12–15 (11–4)	26 – Thomas	9 – Henry	3 – Thomas	William J. Nicks Building (0); Prairie View, TX
February 28, 2022; 7:30 p.m.		at Texas Southern	W 75–72	13–15 (12–4)	12 – Agnew	8 – Brewton	5 – Thomas	H&PE Arena (1,971); Houston, TX
March 3, 2022; 7:30 p.m.		Mississippi Valley State	W 72–69	14–15 (13–4)	14 – Thomas	13 – Henry	4 – Thomas	Davey Whitney Complex (398); Lorman, MS
March 5, 2022; 3:00 p.m.		Arkansas–Pine Bluff	W 100–77	15–15 (14–4)	21 – Montgomery	9 – Henry	10 – Thomas	Davey Whitney Complex (385); Lorman, MS
SWAC tournament
March 9, 2021; 8:30 p.m., ESPN+	(1)	vs. (8) Prairie View A&M; Quarterfinals	W 64–63 ^{OT}	16–15	13 – Agnew	10 – Agnew	3 – Thomas	Bartow Arena (299); Birmingham, AL
March 9, 2021; 8:30 p.m., ESPN+	(1)	vs. (5) Alabama A&M; Semifinals	W 69–64	17–15	19 – Thomas	11 – Brewton	2 – tied	Bartow Arena (579); Birmingham, AL
March 12, 2021; 5:00 p.m., ESPNU	(1)	vs. (2) Texas Southern; Championship	L 62–87	17–16	18 – Thomas	7 – Henry	1 – tied	Bartow Arena (776); Birmingham, AL
NIT
March 15, 2022*; 8:00 p.m., ESPN2		at (1) Texas A&M; First round – Texas A&M Bracket	L 62–74	17–17	20 – Brewton	10 – Henry	4 – tied	Reed Arena (6,379); College Station, TX
*Non-conference game. ^{#}Rankings from AP poll. (#) Tournament seedings in parentheses. All times are in Central.
