= 2021–22 Tulsa Golden Hurricane men's basketball team =

American college basketball season

2021–22 Tulsa Golden Hurricane men's basketball
- Conference: American Athletic Conference
- Record: 11–20 (4–14 AAC)
- Head coach: Frank Haith (8th season)
- Assistant coaches: Kwanza Johnson; Shea Seals; Toby Lane
- Home arena: Reynolds Center

2021–22 American Athletic Conference men's basketball standings
	Conf.				Overall
Team	W		L	PCT	W		L	PCT
No. 15 Houston †	15	–	3	.833	32	–	6	.842
SMU	13	–	4	.765	24	–	9	.727
Memphis	13	–	5	.722	22	–	11	.667
Temple	10	–	7	.588	17	–	12	.586
Tulane	10	–	8	.556	14	–	15	.483
UCF	9	–	9	.500	18	–	12	.600
Wichita State	6	–	9	.400	15	–	13	.536
Cincinnati	7	–	11	.389	18	–	15	.545
East Carolina	6	–	11	.353	15	–	15	.500
Tulsa	4	–	14	.222	11	–	20	.355
South Florida	3	–	15	.167	8	–	23	.258
† 2022 AAC tournament winner Rankings from AP poll

The 2021–22 Tulsa Golden Hurricane men's basketball team represented the University of Tulsa during the 2021–22 NCAA Division I men's basketball season. The Golden Hurricane, led by eighth-year head coach Frank Haith, played their home games at the Reynolds Center in Tulsa, Oklahoma as members of the American Athletic Conference. They finished the season 11–20, 4–14 in AAC play to finish in 10th place. They defeated Wichita State in the first round of the AAC tournament before losing to SMU in the second round.

On March 12, 2022, head coach Frank Haith resigned. On March 22, the school named Louisiana Tech head coach Eric Konkol the team's new head coach.

== Previous season ==
In a season limited due to the ongoing COVID-19 pandemic, the Golden Hurricane finished the 2020–21 season 11–12, 7–9 in AAC play to finish in seventh place. They lost in the first round of the AAC tournament to Tulane.

== Offseason ==
=== Departures ===
Name	Number	Pos.	Height	Weight	Year	Hometown	Reason for departure
Brandon Rachal	1	G	6'6"	218	Senior	Natchitoches, LA	Graduated
Elijah Joiner	3	G	6'3"	201	Senior	Chicago, IL	Graduate transferred to Iona
Keshawn Williams	4	G	6'3"	177	Freshman	Chicago, IL	Transferred to Northern Illinois
Ryan Gendron	10	G	6'4"	204	RS Freshman	Tulsa, OK	Walk-on; transferred to Northeastern State
Emmanuel Ugboh	12	C	7'0"	247	Senior	Lagos, Nigeria	Graduated
Bradley Alcime	13	F	6'8"	216	Freshman	Fort Lauderdale, FL	Transferred to Bethune–Cookman
Christian Shumate	22	G	6'6"	202	Freshman	Chicago Heights, IL	Transferred to McNeese State
Austin Richie	32	G/F	6'6"	226	Junior	Glenwood, IL	Transferred to Florida Gulf Coast

=== Incoming transfers ===
Name	Num	Pos.	Height	Weight	Year	Hometown	Previous school
Sam Griffin	1	G	6'3"	180	Junior	Miami, FL	UT Arlington
Tim Dalger	10	F	6'7"	218	Junior	Fort Lauderdale, FL	Independence CC
Nikita Konstantynovskyi	12	C	6'10"	235	Sophomore	Kyiv, Ukraine	Northeastern Oklahoma A&M College
LaDavius Draine	31	G	6'4"	210	Graduate Student	Calhoun City, MS	Southern Miss
Jeriah Horne	41	F	6'7"	205	Graduate Student	Overland Park, KS	Colorado

=== Recruiting classes ===
==== 2021 recruiting class ====
College recruiting information
Name	Hometown	School	Height	Weight	Commit date
Gavyn Elkamil; SG	Branson, Missouri	Link Year Prep	6 ft 3 in (1.91 m)	185 lb (84 kg)	Aug 10, 2020
Gavyn Elkamil; SG	Recruit ratings: (NR)				
Sterling Gaston-Chapman; SG	Wichita, KS	Campus High School	6 ft 5 in (1.96 m)	N/A	Nov 18, 2020
Sterling Gaston-Chapman; SG	Recruit ratings: (NR)				
Anthony Pritchard; PG	Tulsa, OK	Daniel Webster High School	6 ft 1 in (1.85 m)	170 lb (77 kg)	Mar 29, 2021
Anthony Pritchard; PG	Recruit ratings: (NR)				
Overall recruit ranking:
Note: In many cases, Scout, Rivals, 247Sports, On3, and ESPN may conflict in their listings of height and weight.; In these cases, the average was taken. ESPN grades are on a 100-point scale.; Sources: "Tulsa 2021 Basketball Commitments". Rivals.; "2021 Team Ranking". Rivals.; "2021 Tulsa Golden Hurricane Basketball 24/7 Sports Commits". 247Sports.

==== 2022 recruiting class ====
College recruiting information (2022)
Name	Hometown	School	Height	Weight	Commit date
Charles Chukwu #46 C	Katy, TX	Patricia E. Paetow High School	6 ft 10 in (2.08 m)	240 lb (110 kg)	Sep 6, 2021
Charles Chukwu #46 C	Recruit ratings: Scout: Rivals: 247Sports: ESPN: (79)				
D.J. Jefferson; SF	St. Paul, MN	Minnesota Preparatory Academy	6 ft 5 in (1.96 m)	190 lb (86 kg)	Aug 7, 2021
D.J. Jefferson; SF	Recruit ratings: Scout: Rivals: 247Sports:				
Overall recruit ranking:
Note: In many cases, Scout, Rivals, 247Sports, On3, and ESPN may conflict in their listings of height and weight.; In these cases, the average was taken. ESPN grades are on a 100-point scale.; Sources: "Tulsa 2022 Basketball Commitments". Rivals.; "2022 Team Ranking". Rivals.; "2022 Tulsa Golden Hurricane Basketball 24/7 Sports Commits". 247Sports.

== Roster ==
2021–22 Tulsa Golden Hurricane men's basketball team
Players
Coaches

Pos.	#	Name	Height	Weight	Year	Previous school	Hometown
G	0	Curtis Haywood II	6 ft 5 in (1.96 m)	198 lb (90 kg)	RS Sr	Brewster Academy; Georgia Tech	Oklahoma City, OK
G	1	Sam Griffin	6 ft 3 in (1.91 m)	180 lb (82 kg)	Jr	Westminster HS; UT Arlington	Miami, FL
G	2	Keyshawn Embery-Simpson	6 ft 3 in (1.91 m)	193 lb (88 kg)	RS Jr	Midwest City HS; Arkansas	Midwest City, OK
G	3	Sterling Gaston-Chapman	6 ft 5 in (1.96 m)	210 lb (95 kg)	Fr	Campus HS	Wichita, KS
G	4	Gavyn Elkamil	6 ft 5 in (1.96 m)	190 lb (86 kg)	Fr	Link Year Prep	Pittsburg, KS
G	5	Peyton Urbancic	6 ft 6 in (1.98 m)	199 lb (90 kg)	So	First Baptist Academy	Naples, FL
F	10	Tim Dalger	6 ft 7 in (2.01 m)	218 lb (99 kg)	Jr	Calvary Christian HS; Independence CC	Fort Lauderdale, FL
G	11	Darien Jackson	6 ft 3 in (1.91 m)	203 lb (92 kg)	GS	Blue Valley Northwest HS	Overland Park, KS
C	12	Nikita Konstantynovskyi	6 ft 10 in (2.08 m)	235 lb (107 kg)	So	Secondary School No. 163; Northeastern Oklahoma A&M College	Kyiv, Ukraine
G	14	Anthony Pritchard	6 ft 3 in (1.91 m)	170 lb (77 kg)	Fr	Webster HS	Tulsa, OK
F	15	Josh Earley	6 ft 7 in (2.01 m)	242 lb (110 kg)	Jr	Bishop Miege HS	Shawnee Mission, KS
G	23	Ari Seals (W)	6 ft 3 in (1.91 m)	171 lb (78 kg)	So	Frisco HS	Frisco, TX
F	25	Rey Idowu	6 ft 9 in (2.06 m)	243 lb (110 kg)	Sr	Clearwater Academy; Illinois State	Melbourne, FL
G	31	LaDavius Draine	6 ft 4 in (1.93 m)	210 lb (95 kg)	GS	Calhoun City HS; Southern Miss	Calhoun City, MS
F	41	Jeriah Horne	6 ft 7 in (2.01 m)	205 lb (93 kg)	GS	The Barstow School; Colorado	Overland Park, KS

Head coach

- Frank Haith (Elon)

Assistant coach(es)

- Kwanza Johnson (Tulsa)
- Shea Seals (Tulsa)
- Toby Lane (Wichita State)

Legend

- (C) Team captain
- (S) Suspended
- (I) Ineligible
- (W) Walk-on
- Injured
- Current redshirt

Roster

== Schedule and results ==
Date time, TV	Rank^{#}	Opponent^{#}	Result	Record	High points	High rebounds	High assists	Site (attendance) city, state
Exhibition
November 3, 2021*; 7:00 p.m.		Northeastern State	W 84–53	–	19 – Griffin	7 – Tied	5 – Haywood II	Reynolds Center (2,543); Tulsa, OK
Non-conference regular season
November 10, 2021*; 7:00 p.m., ESPN+		Northwestern State	W 82–75	1–0	22 – Coleman	8 – Garrett	4 – Tied	Reynolds Center (2,461); Tulsa, OK
November 13, 2021*; 12:00 p.m., ESPN+		Air Force; Sunshine Slam campus site game	L 58–59	1–1	21 – Griffin	9 – Horne	2 – Embry–Simpson	Reynolds Center (2,538); Tulsa, OK
November 15, 2021*; 8:00 p.m., ESPNU		Oregon State	W 64–58	2–1	17 – Horne	10 – Horne	3 – Tie	Reynolds Center (2,759); Tulsa, OK
November 20, 2021*; 6:30 p.m., FloSports		vs. Rhode Island; Sunshine Slam semifinals	W 77–71	3–1	21 – Griffin	8 – Dalger	3 – Griffin	Ocean Center (1,357); Daytona Beach, FL
November 21, 2021*; 6:30 p.m., FloSports		vs. Utah; Sunshine Slam Championship	L 58–72	3–2	18 – Griffin	7 – Horne	2 – Jackson	Ocean Center (1,264); Daytona Beach, FL
November 26, 2021*; 7:00 p.m., ESPN+		Little Rock	W 77–63	4–2	17 – Horne	8 – Horne	6 – Pritchard	Reynolds Center (2,687); Tulsa, OK
November 29, 2021*; 7:00 p.m.		at Oral Roberts; PSO Mayor's Cup	L 80–87	4–3	30 – Horne	8 – Horne	5 – Jackson	Mabee Center (5,239); Tulsa, OK
December 3, 2021*; TBA		at Boise State	L 58–63	4–4	17 – Horne	6 – Idowu	4 – Griffin	ExtraMile Arena (6,684); Boise, ID
December 7, 2021*; 8:00 p.m., ESPNU		Loyola Marymount	L 55–60	4–5	16 – Griffin	11 – Horne	2 – Tied	Reynolds Center (2,518); Tulsa, OK
December 11, 2021*; 1:00 p.m., ESPN+		Southern Illinois	W 69–65	5–5	20 – Griffin	9 – Haywood II	3 – Tied	Reynolds Center (2,388); Tulsa, OK
December 16, 2021*; 7:00 p.m., ESPN+		Alcorn State	W 83–62	6–5	19 – Griffin	11 – Haywood II	7 – Pritchard	Reynolds Center (2,556); Tulsa, OK
December 18, 2021*; 3:30 p.m., ESPN+		vs. No. 23 Colorado State; Hoop Hype XL College Basketball Showcase	Canceled due to COVID-19 protocols					Dickies Arena; Fort Worth, TX
December 21, 2021*; 5:30 p.m., ESPN+		vs. North Texas; Compete 4 Cause Classic	Canceled due to COVID-19 protocols					Paycom Center; Oklahoma City, OK
AAC regular season
December 29, 2021; 7:00 p.m., ESPN+		SMU	L 69–74	6–6 (0–1)	14 – Griffin	12 – Horne	2 – Griffin	Reynolds Center (2,614); Tulsa, OK
January 4, 2022; 8:00 p.m., ESPNU		at Memphis	L 64–67	6–7 (0–2)	20 – Horne	7 – Idowu	7 – Pritchard	FedExForum (12,863); Memphis, TN
January 12, 2022; 6:00 p.m., ESPNU		Temple	L 64–69	6–8 (0–3)	15 – Horne	7 – Horne	3 – Pritchard	Reynolds Center (2,918); Tulsa, OK
January 15, 2022; 5:00 p.m., ESPN2		No. 11 Houston	L 64–66	6–9 (0–4)	24 – Horne	6 – Horne	4 – Jackson	Reynolds Center (3,349); Tulsa, OK
January 20, 2022; 8:00 p.m., ESPNU		at Cincinnati	L 69–90	6–10 (0–5)	21 – Jackson	7 – Horne	4 – Griffin	Fifth Third Arena (9,033); Cincinnati, OH
January 23, 2022; 2:00 p.m., ESPN		Memphis	L 81–83	6–11 (0–6)	19 – Horne	7 – Horne	4 – Pritchard	Reynolds Center (3,524); Tulsa, OK
January 26, 2022; 8:00 p.m., ESPNU		at Tulane	L 63–97	6–12 (0–7)	21 – Griffin	5 – Dalger	5 – Griffin	Devlin Fieldhouse (1,345); New Orleans, LA
January 29, 2022; 7:00 p.m., ESPN+		South Florida	W 76–45	7–12 (1–7)	23 – Horne	6 – Horne	4 – Haywood	Reynolds Center (3,012); Tulsa, OK
February 1, 2022; 8:00 p.m., ESPNU		at Wichita State	L 48–58	7–13 (1–8)	17 – Griffin	8 – Idowu	1 – Tied	Charles Koch Arena (8,132); Wichita, KS
February 5, 2022; 1:00 p.m., ESPN+		at Temple	L 58–67	7–14 (1–9)	21 – Idouw	7 – Horne	5 – Pritchard	Liacouras Center (5,045); Philadelphia, PA
February 8, 2022; 7:00 p.m., ESPN+		East Carolina	L 71–73	7–15 (1–10)	18 – Horne	6 – Tied	2 – Tied	Reynolds Center (2,809); Tulsa, OK
February 12, 2022; 7:00 p.m., ESPN+		Cincinnati	W 83–77	8–15 (2–10)	21 – Horne	9 – Horne	10 – Pritchard	Reynolds Center (3,405); Tulsa, OK
February 14, 2022; 6:00 p.m., ESPNU		at UCF; Rescheduled from January 8	L 67–76	8–16 (2–11)	18 – Horne	8 – Horne	3 – Pritchard	Addition Financial Arena (4,077); Orlando, FL
February 19, 2022; 11:00 a.m., ESPNU		at South Florida	W 65–57	9–16 (3–11)	23 – Griffin	8 – Iwodu	4 – Horne	Yuengling Center (2,085); Tampa, FL
February 23, 2022; 7:00 p.m., ESPN+		at SMU	L 61–75	9–17 (3–12)	24 – Horne	5 – Horne	4 – Horne	Moody Coliseum (3,877); University Park, TX
February 26, 2022; 4:00 p.m., ESPN+		at East Carolina	L 59–64	9–18 (3–13)	17 – Jackson	9 – Idowu	5 – Haywood	Williams Arena (3,569); Greenville, NC
March 2, 2022; 8:00 p.m., ESPNU		Wichita State; Rivalry	L 62–72	9–19 (3–14)	15 – Horne	6 – Horne	4 – Horne	Reynolds Center (3,450); Tulsa, OK
March 6, 2022; 1:00 p.m., ESPNU		UCF	W 73–72	10–19 (4–14)	22 – Jackson	9 – Horne	5 – Haywood II	Reynolds Center; Tulsa, OK
AAC tournament
March 10, 2022; 2:00 p.m., ESPNU	(10)	vs. (7) Wichita State; First Round	W 73–67	11–19	21 – Griffin	10 – Jackson	2 – Tied	Dickies Arena; Fort Worth, TX
March 11, 2022; 6:00 p.m., ESPNU	(10)	vs. (2) SMU; Quarterfinals	L 58–83	11–20	16 – Griffin	8 – Idowu	7 – Haywood II	Dickies Arena; Fort Worth, TX
*Non-conference game. ^{#}Rankings from AP Poll. (#) Tournament seedings in parentheses. All times are in Central Time.
