= 2022 American Athletic Conference men's basketball tournament =

U.S. college basketball tournament

- Classification: Division I
- Season: 2021–22
- Teams: 11
- Site: Dickies Arena; Fort Worth, Texas
- Champions: Houston (2nd title)
- Winning coach: Kelvin Sampson (2nd title)
- MVP: Fabian White Jr. (Houston)
- Television: ESPN, ESPN2, ESPNU

2021–22 American Athletic Conference men's basketball standings
	Conf.				Overall
Team	W		L	PCT	W		L	PCT
No. 15 Houston †	15	–	3	.833	32	–	6	.842
SMU	13	–	4	.765	24	–	9	.727
Memphis	13	–	5	.722	22	–	11	.667
Temple	10	–	7	.588	17	–	12	.586
Tulane	10	–	8	.556	14	–	15	.483
UCF	9	–	9	.500	18	–	12	.600
Wichita State	6	–	9	.400	15	–	13	.536
Cincinnati	7	–	11	.389	18	–	15	.545
East Carolina	6	–	11	.353	15	–	15	.500
Tulsa	4	–	14	.222	11	–	20	.355
South Florida	3	–	15	.167	8	–	23	.258
† 2022 AAC tournament winner Rankings from AP poll

The 2022 American Athletic Conference men's basketball tournament was held March 10–13, 2022, at Dickies Arena in Fort Worth, Texas. All games of the tournament were televised by ESPN Inc. The winner of the tournament, the Houston Cougars, received the conference's automatic bid to the 2022 NCAA tournament.

== Seeds ==
Teams were seeded by conference record (tiebreakers were not required as no teams had identical conference records). The top five teams received byes to the quarterfinals.

With the COVID-19 pandemic in the United States still ongoing and the possibility of cancelled games, teams were required to play a minimum of 75% of the average number of conference games played in order to be seeded by winning percentage for the conference tournament; those with less games would be seeded below those meeting the minimum. However, only three games were completely cancelled, so all teams met the 75% requirement.

Seed	School	Conference Record	Tiebreaker
1	Houston	15–3	
2	SMU	13–4	
3	Memphis	13–5	
4	Temple	10–7	
5	Tulane	10–8	
6	UCF	9–9	
7	Wichita State	6–9	
8	Cincinnati	7–11	
9	East Carolina	6–11	
10	Tulsa	4–14	
11	South Florida	3–15	

== Schedule ==
Game	Time	Matchup	Score	Television	Attendance
First Round – March 10, 2022
1	12:00 PM	No. 8 Cincinnati vs. No. 9 East Carolina	74–63	ESPNU	
2	2:00 PM	No. 7 Wichita State vs. No. 10 Tulsa	67–73	ESPNU	
3	6:00 PM	No. 6 UCF vs. No. 11 South Florida	60–58	ESPNU	
Quarterfinals – March 11, 2022
4	12:00 PM	No. 1 Houston vs. No. 8 Cincinnati	69–56	ESPN2	
5	2:00 PM	No. 4 Temple vs. No. 5 Tulane	60–69	ESPN2	
6	6:00 PM	No. 2 SMU vs. No. 10 Tulsa	83–58	ESPNU	
7	8:00 PM	No. 3 Memphis vs. No. 6 UCF	85–69	ESPNU	
Semifinals – March 12, 2022
8	2:00 PM	No. 1 Houston vs. No. 5 Tulane	86–66	ESPN2	
9	4:00 PM	No. 2 SMU vs. No. 3 Memphis	63–70	ESPN2	
Championship – March 13, 2022
10	2:15 PM	No. 1 Houston vs No. 3 Memphis	71–53	ESPN	
*Game times in CT. ()-Rankings denote tournament seeding.

== Bracket ==
* – Denotes overtime period

First round Thursday, March 10
8	Cincinnati	74
9	East Carolina	63
7	Wichita State	67
10	Tulsa	73
6	UCF	60
11	South Florida	58

Quarterfinals; Friday, March 11
1	#18 Houston	69
8	Cincinnati	56
4	Temple	60
5	Tulane	69
2	SMU	83
10	Tulsa	58
3	Memphis	85
6	UCF	69

Semifinals; Saturday, March 12
1	#18 Houston	86
5	Tulane	66
2	SMU	63
3	Memphis	70

Championship; Sunday, March 13
1	#18 Houston	71
3	Memphis	53

== Game summaries ==
=== First Round ===
ESPNU

March 10, 2022
12:00 PM

Report

No. 8 Cincinnati 74, No. 9 East Carolina 63
Scoring by half: 40–41, 34–22
Pts: D. DeJulius (22); Rebs: J. Newman III (8); Asts: J. Newman III (5)	Pts: T. Newton (26); Rebs: V. Jackson (10); Asts: T. Newton (6)

Dickies Arena
Ft. Worth, Texas
Referees: Todd Austin, Olandis Poole, Josue Nieves

ESPNU

March 10, 2022
2:00 PM

Report

No. 7 Wichita State 67, No. 10 Tulsa 73
Scoring by half: 34–24, 39–43
Pts: R. Council IV (19); Rebs: Tied (6); Asts: T. Etienne (5)	Pts: S. Griffin (21); Rebs: J. Horne (10); Asts: Tied (2)

Dickies Arena
Ft. Worth, Texas
Referees: Anthony Jordan, Vladimir Voyard-Tadal, Sean Casady

ESPNU

March 10, 2022
6:00 PM

Report

No. 6 UCF 60, No. 11 South Florida 58
Scoring by half: 29–29, 31–29
Pts: D. Perry (13); Rebs: C. Diong (8); Asts: Tied (4)	Pts: C. Murphy (16); Rebs: R. Tchewa (10); Asts: C. Murphy (8)

Dickies Arena
Ft. Worth, Texas
Referees: Jason Baker, Wil Howard, Robert Felder

=== Quarterfinals ===
ESPN2

March 11, 2022
12:00 PM

Report

No. 1 Houston 69, No. 8 Cincinnati 56
Scoring by half: 27–32, 42–24
Pts: White Jr. (18); Rebs: White Jr. (8); Asts: Shead (7)	Pts: Tied (13); Rebs: Tied (5); Asts: Tied (4)

Dickies Arena
Ft. Worth, Texas
Referees: Jason Baker, Wil Howard, Vladimir Voyard-Tadal

ESPN2

March 11, 2022
2:00 PM

Report

No. 4 Temple 60, No. 5 Tulane 69
Scoring by half: 27–36, 33–33
Pts: Miller (21); Rebs: White (10); Asts: Tied (4)	Pts: Cross (18); Rebs: Tied (9); Asts: James (9)

Dickies Arena
Ft. Worth, Texas
Referees: Anthony Jordan, Sean Casady, Robert Felder

ESPNU

March 11, 2022
6:00 PM

Report

No. 2 SMU 83, No. 10 Tulsa 58
Scoring by half: 43–29, 40–29
Pts: Davis (24); Rebs: Ma. Weathers (9); Asts: Davis (5)	Pts: Griffin (16); Rebs: Idowu (8); Asts: Haywood II (7)

Dickies Arena
Ft. Worth, Texas
Referees: Rob Rorke, Owen Shortt, Bill Jacobson

ESPNU

March 11, 2022
8:00 PM

No. 3 Memphis 85, No. 6 UCF 69
Scoring by half: 41–31, 44–38
Pts: Quiñones (22); Rebs: Duren (20); Asts: Lomax (7)	Pts: Perry (23); Rebs: Tied (5); Asts: Tied (7)

Dickies Arena
Ft. Worth, Texas
Referees: Olandis Poole, Todd Austin, Josue Nieves

=== Semifinals ===
ESPN2

March 12, 2022
2:00 PM

No.1 Houston 86, No. 5 Tulane 66
Scoring by half: 37–29, 49–37
Pts: Edwards (20); Rebs: Roberts (13); Asts: Edwards (8)	Pts: Forbes (19); Rebs: Forbes (7); Asts: Cross (7)

Dickies Arena
Ft. Worth, Texas
Referees: Patrick Evans, K.B. Burdett, Rob Rorke

ESPN2

March 12
4:00 PM

No. 2 SMU 63, No. 3 Memphis 70
Scoring by half: 32–26, 38–37
Pts: Weathers (16); Rebs: Weathers (6); Asts: Tied (2)	Pts: Tied (12); Rebs: Williams (10); Asts: Tied (3)

Dickies Arena
Ft. Worth, Texas
Referees: Steven Anderson, Mike Nance, Owen Shortt

=== Championship Game ===
ESPN

March 13, 2022
2:15 PM

No.1 Houston 71, No. 3 Memphis 53
Scoring by half: 36–24, 35–29
Pts: White Jr. (20); Rebs: Edwards (11); Asts: Moore (8)	Pts: Duren (14); Rebs: Duren (10); Asts: Tied (4)

Dickies Arena
Ft. Worth, Texas
Referees: Don Daily, Floyd Shuler, Pat Adams

*Game times: CT

== See also ==
- 2022 American Athletic Conference women's basketball tournament
- American Athletic Conference men's basketball tournament
- American Athletic Conference
