= 2021–22 East Carolina Pirates men's basketball team =

American college basketball season

2021–22 East Carolina Pirates men's basketball
- Conference: American Athletic Conference
- Record: 15–15 (6–11 AAC)
- Head coach: Joe Dooley (4th season of 2nd stint, 8th overall season)
- Assistant coaches: Steve DeMeo; Antwon Jackson; George Wright-Easy
- Home arena: Williams Arena

2021–22 American Athletic Conference men's basketball standings
| | Conf. | | | | Overall |
| Team | W | | L | PCT | W | | L | PCT |
|---|---|---|---|---|---|---|---|---|
| No. 15 Houston † | 15 | – | 3 | .833 | 32 | – | 6 | .842 |
| SMU | 13 | – | 4 | .765 | 24 | – | 9 | .727 |
| Memphis | 13 | – | 5 | .722 | 22 | – | 11 | .667 |
| Temple | 10 | – | 7 | .588 | 17 | – | 12 | .586 |
| Tulane | 10 | – | 8 | .556 | 14 | – | 15 | .483 |
| UCF | 9 | – | 9 | .500 | 18 | – | 12 | .600 |
| Wichita State | 6 | – | 9 | .400 | 15 | – | 13 | .536 |
| Cincinnati | 7 | – | 11 | .389 | 18 | – | 15 | .545 |
| East Carolina | 6 | – | 11 | .353 | 15 | – | 15 | .500 |
| Tulsa | 4 | – | 14 | .222 | 11 | – | 20 | .355 |
| South Florida | 3 | – | 15 | .167 | 8 | – | 23 | .258 |
† 2022 AAC tournament winner Rankings from AP poll

The 2021–22 East Carolina Pirates men's basketball team represented East Carolina University during the 2021–22 NCAA Division I men's basketball season. The Pirates were led by fourth year head coach, Joe Dooley, who previously coached the Pirates from 1995 to 1999, and played their home games at Williams Arena at Minges Coliseum as eighth-year members of the American Athletic Conference.

== Previous season ==
The Pirates finished the 2020–21 season 8–11, 2–10 in AAC play to finish in last place. They lost in the first round of the AAC tournament to UCF.

== Offseason ==
=== Departures ===
| Name | Number | Pos. | Height | Weight | Year | Hometown | Reason for departure |
|---|---|---|---|---|---|---|---|
| Derrick Quansah | 0 | F/C | 7'0" | 230 | Freshman | Cape Coast, Ghana | Left the team for personal reasons |
| Jayden Gardner | 1 | F | 6'7" | 235 | Junior | Wale Forest, NC | Graduate transferred to Virginia |
| Noah Farrakhan | 3 | G | 6'0" | 165 | Freshman | Newark, NJ | Transferred to Eastern Michigan |
| Tyrie Jackson | 10 | G | 6'2" | 215 | RS Senior | Tifton, GA | Graduate transferred to Prairie View A&M |
| Ian Jones | 13 | G | 6'3" | 195 | Senior | Lillington, NC | Walk-on; graduated |
| Bitumba Baruti | 20 | G | 6'7" | 225 | RS Senior | Lubumbashi, DR Congo | Graduate transferred to Florida Atlantic |
| Ludgy Debaut | 21 | C | 7'0" | 245 | Senior | Les Abymes, Guadeloupe | Graduate transferred to Northeastern State |
| Evan Umastead | 24 | G | 6'0" | 195 | Senior | Cary, NC | Walk-on; graduated |
| Samson Strickland | 25 | F | 6'5" | 220 | Junior | Wilson, NC | Walk-on; didn't return |
| Charles Coleman | 32 | F/C | 7'0" | 255 | Sophomore | Boston, MA | Transferred to Saint Joseph's |
| Miles James | 33 | G | 6'6" | 215 | Junior | Inglewood, CA | Transferred to Cal State Northridge |
| Edra Luster | 44 | F/C | 7'0" | 230 | Senior | Oakland, CA | Graduate transferred to Northeastern State |

=== Incoming transfers ===
| Name | Num | Pos. | Height | Weight | Year | Hometown | Previous school |
|---|---|---|---|---|---|---|---|
| Wynston Tabbs | 10 | G | 6'2" | 195 | RS Junior | Suitland, MD | Boston College |
| Vance Jackson | 13 | F | 6'9" | 230 | Graduate Student | Pasadena, CA | Arkansas |
| Alanzo Frink | 20 | F | 6'8" | 270 | RS Junior | Jersey City, NJ | South Carolina |
| Brandon Johnson | 23 | F | 6'8" | 210 | Sophomore | Raleigh, NC | Brunswick CC |

=== 2021 recruiting class ===
College recruiting information
| Name | Hometown | School | Height | Weight | Commit date |
|---|---|---|---|---|---|
| Tay Mosher; SF | The Colony, TX | The Colony High School | 6 ft 7 in (2.01 m) | 215 lb (98 kg) | 07/13/2020 |
| Tay Mosher; SF | Recruit ratings: 247Sports: (NR) | | | | |
| RJ Felton; SG | Aiken, SC | Aiken High School | 6 ft 4 in (1.93 m) | 190 lb (86 kg) | 08/24/2020 |
| RJ Felton; SG | Recruit ratings: (NR) | | | | |
| Alexis Reyes; SG | Roxbury, MA | Cushing Academy | 6 ft 6 in (1.98 m) | 190 lb (86 kg) | 09/22/2020 |
| Alexis Reyes; SG | Recruit ratings: Rivals: 247Sports: (NR) | | | | |
| Marlon Lestin; PF | Montreal, QC | Halton Prep | 6 ft 9 in (2.06 m) | 200 lb (91 kg) | Feb 17, 2021 |
| Marlon Lestin; PF | Recruit ratings: (NR) | | | | |
| Javon Small; CG | South Bend, IN | Compass Prep | 6 ft 2 in (1.88 m) | 200 lb (91 kg) | Mar 2, 2021 |
| Javon Small; CG | Recruit ratings: (NR) | | | | |
Overall recruit ranking:
Note: In many cases, Scout, Rivals, 247Sports, On3, and ESPN may conflict in their listings of height and weight.; In these cases, the average was taken. ESPN grades are on a 100-point scale.; Sources: "East Carolina 2021 Basketball Commitments". Rivals.; "2021 East Carolina Pirates Recruiting Class". ESPN.; "2021 Team Ranking". Rivals.; "2021 East Carolina Pirates Basketball 24/7 Sports Commits". 247Sports.

== Roster ==
2021–22 East Carolina Pirates men's basketball team
Players
Coaches

| Pos. | # | Name | Height | Weight | Year | Previous school | Hometown |
|---|---|---|---|---|---|---|---|
| G/F | 0 | Alexis Reyes | 6 ft 7 in (2.01 m) | 195 lb (88 kg) | Fr | Putnam Science Academy | Roxbury, MA |
| G | 1 | Javon Small | 6 ft 2 in (1.88 m) | 180 lb (82 kg) | Fr | AZ Compass Prep | South Bend, IN |
| G | 2 | Tristen Newton | 6 ft 5 in (1.96 m) | 190 lb (86 kg) | Jr | Burges | El Paso, TX |
| G | 3 | RJ Felton | 6 ft 3 in (1.91 m) | 200 lb (91 kg) | Fr | Aiken | Aiken, SC |
| G/F | 4 | Brandon Suggs | 6 ft 6 in (1.98 m) | 185 lb (84 kg) | Jr | Massanutten Military Academy | Powder Springs, GA |
| G | 10 | Wynston Tabbs | 6 ft 2 in (1.88 m) | 195 lb (88 kg) | RS Jr | Boston College | Suitland, MD |
| G | 11 | J. J. Miles | 6 ft 7 in (2.01 m) | 215 lb (98 kg) | GS | Cape Fear CC | Garysburg, NC |
| G | 12 | Tremont Robinson-White | 6 ft 1 in (1.85 m) | 170 lb (77 kg) | Sr | Garden City CC | Little Rock, AR |
| F | 13 | Vance Jackson | 6 ft 9 in (2.06 m) | 230 lb (104 kg) | GS | Arkansas | Pasadena, CA |
| F | 15 | Tay Mosher | 6 ft 7 in (2.01 m) | 215 lb (98 kg) | Fr | The Colony | The Colony, TX |
| F | 20 | Alanzo Frink | 6 ft 8 in (2.03 m) | 270 lb (122 kg) | RS Jr | South Carolina | Jersey City, NJ |
| C | 21 | Ludgy Debaut | 7 ft 0 in (2.13 m) | 245 lb (111 kg) | RS Sr | NW Florida State College | Les Abymes, Guadeloupe |
| F | 23 | Brandon Johnson | 6 ft 8 in (2.03 m) | 210 lb (95 kg) | So | Brunswick CC | Raleigh, NC |
| F | 25 | Marlon Lestin | 6 ft 9 in (2.06 m) | 200 lb (91 kg) | Fr | Halton Prep | Montreal, QC |
| G | 42 | David Kasanganay (W) | 6 ft 2 in (1.88 m) | 180 lb (82 kg) | RS Jr | Navy | Charlotte, NC |
| G | 44 | Brenden Kelly (W) | 5 ft 9 in (1.75 m) | 165 lb (75 kg) | So | Elizabeth | Clark, NJ |

Head coach

- Joe Dooley (George Washington)

Assistant coach(es)

- Steve DeMeo (Buffalo)
- Antwon Jackson (Pikeville)
- George Wright-Easy (Saint Francis (PA))

Legend

- (C) Team captain
- (S) Suspended
- (I) Ineligible
- (W) Walk-on
- Injured
- Current redshirt

Roster

== Schedule and results ==
| Date time, TV | Rank^{#} | Opponent^{#} | Result | Record | High points | High rebounds | High assists | Site (attendance) city, state |
Non-conference regular season
| November 9, 2021*; 7:00 p.m., ESPN+ | | South Carolina State | W 70–62 | 1–0 | 18 – Miles | 13 – Tied | 9 – Robinson-White | Williams Arena (3,605); Greenville, NC |
| November 12, 2021*; 7:00 p.m., ESPN+ | | Canisius | W 83–71 | 2–0 | 14 – Tied | 7 – Tied | 6 – Tied | Williams Arena (3,507); Greenville, NC |
| November 14, 2021*; 4:00 p.m., ESPN+ | | Western Carolina | W 95–79 | 3–0 | 30 – Newton | 6 – Tied | 6 – Newton | Williams Arena (3,245); Greenville, NC |
| November 18, 2021*; 7:00 p.m., ESPN2 | | vs. Oklahoma; Myrtle Beach Invitational Quarterfinals | L 74–79 | 3–1 | 18 – Newton | 6 – Debaut | 6 – Suggs | HTC Center (1,237); Conway, SC |
| November 19, 2021*; 7:30 p.m., ESPNU | | vs. Old Dominion; Myrtle Beach Invitational Consolation round | W 73–60 | 4–1 | 18 – Newton | 9 – Johnson | 6 – Newton | HTC Center (1,183); Conway, SC |
| November 21, 2021*; 6:00 p.m., ESPNU | | vs. Davidson; Myrtle Beach Invitational – 5th place Game | L 67–76 | 4–2 | 28 – Newton | 11 – Jackson | 5 – Newton | HTC Center (1,101); Conway, SC |
| November 27, 2021*; 4:00 p.m., ESPN+ | | Coppin State | W 70–68 | 5–2 | 25 – Suggs | 19 – Johnson | 5 – Newton | Williams Arena (4,027); Greenville, NC |
| November 30, 2021*; 7:00 p.m., ESPN+ | | Old Dominion | W 63–62 | 6–2 | 21 – Jackson | 8 – Suggs | 8 – Newton | Williams Arena; Greenville, NC |
| December 4, 2021*; 3:00 p.m., ESPN+ | | Gardner–Webb | W 62–52 | 7–2 | 15 – Miles | 11 – Debaut | 4 – Newton | Williams Arena; Greenville, NC |
| December 7, 2021*; 7:00 p.m., ESPN+ | | North Carolina A&T | W 82–71 | 8–2 | 23 – Jackson | 9 – Miles | 8 – Newton | Williams Arena (3,859); Greenville, NC |
| December 17, 2021*; 1:30 p.m., ESPN+ | | vs. Liberty; Basketball Hall of Fame Shootout | L 64–74 | 8–3 | 15 – Tied | 10 – Jackson | 3 – Tied | Spectrum Center; Charlotte, NC |
| December 21, 2021*; 12:00 p.m., ESPN+ | | Southern Miss | W 68–67 | 9–3 | 22 – Newton | 7 – Jackson | 6 – Newton | Williams Arena (2,054); Greenville, NC |
AAC Regular Season
| December 29, 2021; 7:00 p.m., ESPN+ | | Wichita State | Postponed due to COVID-19 | | | | | Williams Arena (–); Greenville, NC |
| January 5, 2022; 7:00 p.m., ESPN+ | | Tulane | W 88–80 ^{OT} | 10–3 (1–0) | 32 – Newton | 10 – Johnson | 11 – Suggs | Williams Arena (1,414); Greenville, NC |
| January 8, 2022; 12:00 p.m., ESPN+ | | at Temple | L 75–78 | 10–4 (1–1) | 15 – Frink | 6 – Tied | 9 – Newton | Liacouras Center (2,774); Philadelphia, PA |
| January 12, 2022; 7:00 p.m., ESPN+ | | at Cincinnati | L 71–79 | 10–5 (1–2) | 35 – Jackson | 9 – Jackson | 4 – Tied | Fifth Third Arena (7,911); Cincinnati, OH |
| January 15, 2022; 4:00 p.m., ESPN+ | | Memphis | W 72–71 | 11–5 (2–2) | 17 – Jackson | 7 – Jackson | 7 – Newton | Williams Arena (5,107); Greenville, NC |
| January 18, 2022; 7:00 p.m., ESPN+ | | UCF | L 85–92 ^{OT} | 11–6 (2–3) | 27 – Newton | 8 – Johnson | 5 – Tied | Williams Arena (4,167); Greenville, NC |
| January 22, 2022; 6:00 p.m., ESPN2 | | at No. 10 Houston | L 36–79 | 11–7 (2–4) | 14 – Newton | 6 – Newton | 1 – Tied | Fertitta Center (7,287); Houston, TX |
| January 27, 2022; 9:00 p.m., ESPN2 | | at Memphis | L 54–71 | 11–8 (2–5) | 19 – Newton | 12 – Jackson | 4 – Robinson-White | FedExForum (13,418); Memphis, TN |
| January 30, 2022; 12:00 p.m., ESPNU | | Cincinnati | L 59–60 | 11–9 (2–6) | 25 – Jackson | 10 – Jackson | 5 – Newton | Williams Arena (3,834); Greenville, NC |
| February 2, 2022; 7:00 p.m., ESPN+ | | Temple | L 63–71 | 11–10 (2–7) | 22 – Newton | 7 – Jackson | 4 – Tied | Williams Arena (3,321); Greenville, NC |
| February 5, 2022; 2:00 p.m., ESPN+ | | at Tulane | L 66–86 | 11–11 (2–8) | 27 – Jackson | 9 – Newton | 8 – Newton | Devlin Fieldhouse (1,579); New Orleans, LA |
| February 8, 2022; 8:00 p.m., ESPN+ | | at Tulsa | W 73–71 | 12–11 (3–8) | 22 – Jackson | 4 – Tied | 6 – Tied | Reynolds Center (2,809); Tulsa, OK |
| February 12, 2022; 6:00 p.m., ESPNU | | SMU | L 66–80 | 12–12 (3–9) | 19 – Newton | 11 – Debaut | 5 – Newton | Williams Arena (3,443); Greenville, NC |
| February 17, 2022; 7:00 p.m., ESPN+ | | at South Florida; Previously scheduled for Jan. 1 | W 65–57 | 13–12 (4–9) | 16 – Jackson | 8 – Debaut | 10 – Newton | Yuengling Center (2,034); Tampa, FL |
| February 20, 2022; 2:00 p.m., ESPN+ | | at UCF | L 66–69 | 13–13 (4–10) | 19 – Newton | 9 – Debaut | 3 – Suggs | Addition Financial Arena (4,427); Orlando, FL |
| February 23, 2022; 7:00 p.m., ESPN+ | | South Florida | W 64–60 | 14–13 (5–10) | 15 – Suggs | 10 – Debaut | 5 – Newton | Williams Arena (3,193); Greenville, NC |
| February 26, 2022; 4:00 p.m., ESPN+ | | Tulsa | W 64–59 | 15–13 (6–10) | 27 – Newton | 7 – Debaut | 5 – Newton | Williams Arena (3,569); Greenville, NC |
| March 5, 2021; 3:00 p.m., ESPNU | | at Wichita State | L 62–70 | 15–14 (6–11) | 16 – Newton | 11 – Newton | 6 – Newton | Charles Koch Arena (8,177); Wichita, KS |
AAC tournament
| March 10, 2022; 1:00 p.m., ESPNU | (9) | vs. (8) Cincinnati; First Round | L 63–74 | 15–15 | 26 – Newton | 10 – Jackson | 6 – Newton | Dickies Arena; Fort Worth, TX |
*Non-conference game. ^{#}Rankings from AP Poll. (#) Tournament seedings in parentheses. All times are in Eastern Time.
