= 2012–13 Arkansas–Pine Bluff Golden Lions men's basketball team =

American college basketball season

2012–13 Arkansas–Pine Bluff Golden Lions men's basketball
- Conference: Southwestern Athletic Conference
- Record: 16–14 (15–3 SWAC)
- Head coach: George Ivory (5th season)
- Assistant coach: Eddie McCarter
- Home arena: K. L. Johnson Complex

2012–13 SWAC men's basketball standings
	Conf.				Overall
Team	W		L	PCT	W		L	PCT
Texas Southern**	16	–	2	.889	17	–	14	.548
Southern †	15	–	3	.833	23	–	10	.697
Arkansas–Pine Bluff*	15	–	3	.833	16	–	14	.533
Jackson State	9	–	9	.500	11	–	18	.379
Prairie View A&M	8	–	10	.444	15	–	19	.441
Alabama State	8	–	10	.444	10	–	22	.313
Alcorn State	8	–	10	.444	10	–	24	.294
Alabama A&M	6	–	12	.333	11	–	20	.355
Mississippi Valley State*	5	–	13	.278	5	–	23	.179
Grambling State	0	–	18	.000	0	–	28	.000
† 2013 SWAC tournament winner As of March 21, 2013; *Ineligible for postseason play due to APR penalties **Ineligible for postseason play due to NCAA sanctions Rankings from AP Poll

The 2012–13 Arkansas–Pine Bluff Golden Lions men's basketball team represented the University of Arkansas at Pine Bluff during the 2012–13 NCAA Division I men's basketball season. The Golden Lions, led by fifth year head coach George Ivory, played their home games at the K. L. Johnson Complex and were members of the Southwestern Athletic Conference.

Due to low APR scores, the Golden Lions were ineligible for post season play, including the SWAC Tournament. They finished the season 16–14, 15–3 in SWAC play to finish in a tie for second place with Southern.

== Roster ==
Number	Name	Position	Height	Weight	Year	Hometown
1	Marcel Mosley	Guard	6–0	180	Junior	Marion, Arkansas
3	DaVon Haynes	Forward	6–8	215	Junior	Detroit, Michigan
5	Vince Martin	Guard	6–1	200	Junior	Marietta, Georgia
10	Lazabian Jackson	Guard	6–3	190	Senior	Eufaula, Alabama
12	Jaylon Floyd	Guard	6–4	190	Sophomore	Detroit, Michigan
13	Warren Boyd	Guard	6–3	195	Freshman	Terrell, Arkansas
14	Tevin Hammond	Guard	6–0	185	Sophomore	Little Rock, Arkansas
15	Trent Whiting	Forward	6–6	195	Freshman	Des Arc, Arkansas
22	Mitchell Anderson	Forward	6–7	190	Senior	Chicago, Illinois
30	Kyle Jones	Guard	5–10	185	Junior	Shreveport, Louisiana
34	Austin Allen	Forward	6–6	230	Junior	Powder Springs, Georgia
44	Daniel Broughton	Forward	6–8	225	Junior	Pine Bluff, Arkansas
52	Terrell Kennedy	Forward/Center	6–6	250	Senior	Jackson, Mississippi

== Schedule ==
Date time, TV	Opponent	Result	Record	Site (attendance) city, state
Regular Season
11/09/2012*; 8:30 pm	vs. Houston Baptist; Rainbow Classic	L 68–72	0–1	Stan Sheriff Center (5,674); Honolulu, HI
11/11/2012*; 10:00 pm	at Hawaiʻi; Rainbow Classic	L 54–81	0–2	Stan Sheriff Center (5,339); Honolulu, HI
11/12/2012*; 11:00 pm	vs. Maryland–Eastern Shore; Rainbow Classic	W 62–52	1–2	Stan Sheriff Center (5,388); Honolulu, HI
11/21/2012*; 9:30 pm, FSSD	at No. 25 San Diego State	L 43–79	1–3	Viejas Arena (12,414); San Diego, CA
11/24/2012*; 8:30 pm, P12N	at Washington State	L 38–66	1–4	Beasley Coliseum (4,571); Pullman, WA
11/28/2012*; 7:00 pm, P12N	at Arizona State	L 54–67	1–5	Wells Fargo Arena (4,545); Tempe, AZ
12/01/2012*; 9:00 pm, P12N	at Oregon	L 59–80	1–6	Matthew Knight Arena (5,281); Eugene, OR
12/05/2012*; 7:00 pm, BTN	at No. 19 Michigan State	L 44–76	1–7	Breslin Center (14,797); East Lansing, MI
12/08/2012*; 3:00 pm	at Air Force	L 49–65	1–8	Clune Arena (1,553); Colorado Springs, CO
12/18/2012*; 7:00 pm	at Akron	L 46–76	1–9	James A. Rhodes Arena (2,639); Akron, OH
12/22/2012*; 8:25 pm	UTEP; Sun Bowl Invitational	L 61–83	1–10	Don Haskins Center (7,132); El Paso, TX
12/23/2012*; 6:00 pm	Central Michigan; Sun Bowl Invitational	L 45–62	1–11	Don Haskins Center (7,532); El Paso, TX
01/02/2013; 7:30 pm	Mississippi Valley State	W 79–64	2–11 (1–0)	K. L. Johnson Complex (1,651); Pine Bluff, AR
01/06/2013; 6:00 pm	at Alabama State	W 73–58	3–11 (2–0)	K. L. Johnson Complex (2,333); Pine Bluff, AR
01/08/2013; 7:30 pm	Alabama A&M	W 77–61	4–11 (3–0)	K. L. Johnson Complex (3,989); Pine Bluff, AR
01/12/2013; 4:25 pm	at Southern	L 50–84	4–12 (3–1)	F. G. Clark Center (1,880); Baton Rouge, LA
01/14/2013; 7:45 pm	at Alcorn State	W 62–52	5–12 (4–1)	Davey Whitney Complex (500); Lorman, MS
01/19/2013; 7:30 pm	Texas Southern	W 66–63	6–12 (5–1)	K. L. Johnson Complex (3,674); Pine Bluff, AR
01/21/2013; 7:30 pm	Prairie View A&M	W 55–51	7–12 (6–1)	K. L. Johnson Complex (3,173); Pine Bluff, AR
01/26/2013; 5:00 pm	at Grambling State	W 79–67	8–12 (7–1)	Fredrick C. Hobdy Assembly Center (1,384); Grambling, LA
01/28/2013; 7:30 pm	at Jackson State	L 67–82	8–13 (7–2)	Williams Assembly Center (1,055); Jackson, MS
02/02/2013; 5:40 pm	at Alabama State	W 81–77	9–13 (8–2)	Dunn–Oliver Acadome (2,256); Montgomery, AL
02/04/2013; 8:00 pm	at Alabama A&M	W 76–67	10–13 (9–2)	Elmore Gymnasium (808); Normal, AL
02/09/2013; 7:30 pm	Southern	W 55–52	11–13 (10–2)	K. L. Johnson Complex (3,462); Pine Bluff, AR
02/11/2013; 8:00 pm, ESPNU	Alcorn State	W 80–52	12–13 (11–2)	K. L. Johnson Complex (4,355); Pine Bluff, AR
02/16/2013; 1:30 pm	at Texas Southern	L 69–75	12–14 (11–3)	Health and Physical Education Arena (1,824); Houston, TX
02/18/2013; 8:00 pm	at Prairie View A&M	W 76–47	13–14 (12–3)	William Nicks Building (1,412); Prairie View, TX
02/23/2013; 7:30 pm	Grambling State	W 61–45	14–14 (13–3)	K. L. Johnson Complex (5,047); Pine Bluff, AR
02/25/2013; 8:20 pm	Jackson State	W 73–72	15–14 (14–3)	K. L. Johnson Complex (3,026); Pine Bluff, AR
02/28/2013; 7:30 pm	at Mississippi Valley State	W 78–70 ^{OT}	16–14 (15–3)	Harrison HPER Complex (2,073); Itta Bena, MS
*Non-conference game. ^{#}Rankings from AP Poll. (#) Tournament seedings in parentheses. All times are in Central Time.
