= 2009–10 Mississippi Valley State Delta Devils basketball team =

American college basketball season

2009–10 Mississippi Valley State Delta Devils men's basketball
- Conference: Southwestern Athletic Conference
- Record: 9-23 (8-10 SWAC)
- Head coach: Sean Woods (2nd season)
- Assistant coach: Dylan Howard (2nd season)
- Home arena: Harrison HPER Complex

2009–10 SWAC men's basketball standings
	Conf.				Overall
Team	W		L	PCT	W		L	PCT
Jackson State	17	–	1	.944	19	–	12	.613
Arkansas–Pine Bluff†	16	–	4	.800	17	–	15	.531
Alabama State	12	–	7	.632	15	–	15	.500
Prairie View A&M	11	–	7	.611	16	–	13	.552
Texas Southern	12	–	8	.600	16	–	16	.500
Alabama A&M	8	–	10	.444	11	–	15	.423
Mississippi Valley State	8	–	10	.444	9	–	23	.281
Grambling State	4	–	15	.211	7	–	21	.250
Southern	3	–	15	.167	5	–	25	.167
Alcorn State	2	–	16	.111	2	–	29	.065
† 2010 SWAC tournament winner As of March 13, 2010; Rankings from AP Poll

The 2009–10 Mississippi Valley State Delta Devils basketball team represented Mississippi Valley State University during the 2009–10 NCAA Division I men's basketball season. The Delta Devils, led by second year head coach Sean Woods, played their home games at Harrison HPER Complex as members of the Southwestern Athletic Conference. The Delta Devils finished the season 9–23 overall and 8–10 in SWAC conference play. They lost 69–66 in the first round of the SWAC Basketball tournament to Arkansas-Pine Bluff.

== Roster ==
Number	Name	Position	Height	Weight	Year	Hometown
1	Darian Donald	Forward	6–5	185	Junior	Columbus, Mississippi
2	Michael Mayo	Guard	6–3	180	Junior	Los Angeles, California
3	Tashan Newsome	Guard	6–4	200	Sophomore	Albany, New York
5	Joshua Mack	Guard	6–0	185	Junior	Hopkinsville, Kentucky
10	Julius Cheeks	Guard	6–2	190	Senior	Missouri City, Texas
11	D'Angelo Jackson	Guard	6–1	170	Junior	Milwaukee, Wisconsin
12	Amos Studivant	Forward	6-8	230	Sophomore	Bessemer, Alabama
15	Shannon Behling	Guard	6–7	200	Senior	Columbia, South Carolina
21	Cor-J Cox	Guard	6-5	190	Sophomore	Washington, North Carolina
22	Orlando Smith	Forward	6–5	210	Junior	Columbus, Mississippi
25	Kevin Burwell	Guard	5-10	185	Sophomore	Philadelphia, Pennsylvania
30	Mark Holmes	Forward	6-6	215	Freshman	River Grove, Illinois
33	Ricky Lamb	Forward	6–6	190	Freshman	Jacksonville, Florida
42	Jason Holmes	Forward	6–9	225	Sophomore	River Grove, Illinois

== Schedule and results ==
Date time, TV	Rank^{#}	Opponent^{#}	Result	Record	High points	High rebounds	High assists	Site (attendance) city, state
Non-conference regular season
November 13, 2009*; 9:00 pm		at Washington State	L 66-94	0–1	14 – Newsome	4 – J. Holmes	4 – Cheeks	Beasley Coliseum (9,188); Pullman, WA
November 14, 2009*; 7:00 pm, KHQ-TV/FSN		at Gonzaga	L 74-92	0–2	12 – J. Holmes	8 – Newsome	5 – Newsome	McCarthey Athletic Center (6,000); Spokane, WA
November 19, 2009*; 7:00 pm		Champion Christian	W 102-56	1-2	13 – 2 Tied	9 – Behling	8 – Burwell	Harrison HPER Complex; Itta Bena, MS
November 22, 2009*; 1:00 pm		at Iowa State; Chicago Invitational	L 55-96	1-3	17 – Cheeks	5 – J. Holmes	3 – 2 Tied	Hilton Coliseum (11,077); Ames, IA
November 24, 2009*; 7:00 pm		at Saint Louis; Chicago Invitational Challenge	L 39-75	1-4	13 – J. Holmes	6 – 2 Tied	1 – 4 Tied	Chaifetz Arena (6,842); St. Louis, MO
November 27, 2009*; 2:30 pm		vs. Liberty; Chicago Invitational Challenge	L 53-72	1–5	18 – Cheeks	7 – Behling	4 – Jackson	Credit Union 1 Arena; Chicago, IL
November 28, 2009*; 11:30 am		vs. Kennesaw State; Chicago Invitational Challenge	L 68-85	1–6	16 – Lamb	7 – Lamb	4 – Mack	Credit Union 1 Arena; Chicago, IL
December 5, 2009*; 2:00 pm		at Arkansas	L 54-91	1–7	17 – Newsome	6 – 2 Tied	3 – Jackson	Bud Walton Arena (13,474); Fayetteville, AR
December 12, 2009*; 1:00 pm		at Chattanooga	L 60-82	1–8	20 – Behling	6 – 2 Tied	3 – 2 Tied	McKenzie Arena; Chattanooga, TN
December 16, 2009*; 9:00 pm		at Oregon	L 51-79	1–9	21 – Cheeks	6 – Behling	3 – Lamb	McArthur Court (5,713); Eugene, OR
December 19, 2009*; 9:00 pm		at Oregon State	L 62-76	1–10	15 – Behling	9 – Behling	6 – Cheeks	Gill Coliseum (4,723); Corvallis, OR
December 22, 2009*; 7:30 pm		Arkansas State	L 64-71	1–11	19 – Cheeks	8 – Studivant	6 – Burwell	Harrison HPER Complex; Itta Bena, MS
December 28, 2009*; 7:00 pm		at Mississippi State	L 45-73	1–12	16 – Behling	14 – Behling	3 – Cheeks	Humphrey Coliseum (5,421); Starkville, MS
SWAC regular season
January 4, 2010; 7:30 pm		Arkansas-Pine Bluff	L 68-69 ^{OT}	1-13 (0-1)	18 – Behling	10 – Behling	5 – Burwell	Harrison HPER Complex; Itta Bena, MS
January 9, 2010; 5:00 pm		at Alabama State	W 76-73	2-13 (1-1)	21 – Cheeks	7 – Cheeks	6 – Burwell	Dunn-Oliver Acadome; Montgomery, AL
January 11, 2010; 7:30 pm		at Alabama A&M	L 56-72	2-14 (1-2)	11 – 2 Tied	7 – Smith	3 – Cheeks	T.M. Elmore Gymnasium; Normal, AL
January 16, 2010; 4:30 pm		Alcorn State	W 80-70	3-14 (2-2)	14 – Smith	11 – Behling	6 – Burwell	Harrison HPER Complex; Itta Bena, MS
January 18, 2010; 6:00 pm		Southern	W 57-45	4-14 (3-2)	14 – Behling	12 – Behling	4 – Cheeks	Harrison HPER Complex; Itta Bena, MS
January 23, 2010; 4:30 pm		at Texas Southern	L 73-74	4-15 (3-3)	27 – Behling	5 – J. Holmes	9 – Burwell	H&PE Arena; Houston, TX
January 25, 2010; 7:30 pm		at Prairie View A&M	L 63-69	4-16 (3-4)	21 – Cheeks	9 – Behling	3 – 2 Tied	William Nicks Building; Prairie View, TX
January 30, 2010; 4:30 pm		Jackson State	L 59-77	4-17 (3-5)	21 – Cheeks	9 – Studivant	4 – Jackson	Harrison HPER Complex; Itta Bena, MS
February 1, 2010; 7:30 pm		Grambling State	W 93-83	5-17 (4-5)	18 – Cheeks	6 – 2 Tied	5 – 2 Tied	Harrison HPER Complex; Itta Bena, MS
February 6, 2010; 4:30 pm		Alabama State	W 82-71	6-17 (5-5)	19 – Behling	12 – Donald	3 – 2 Tied	Harrison HPER Complex; Itta Bena, MS
February 8, 2010; 7:30 pm		Alabama A&M	L 69-77	6-18 (5-6)	18 – Cheeks	11 – Studivant	8 – Cheeks	Harrison HPER Complex; Itta Bena, MS
February 13, 2010; 4:30 pm		at Alcorn State	L 54-55	6-19 (5-7)	19 – Behling	8 – J. Holmes	6 – Burwell	Davey Whitney Complex; Lorman, MS
February 15, 2010; 5:30 pm		at Southern	W 54-48	7-19 (6-7)	17 – Cox	10 – Behling	5 – Burwell	F.G. Clark Center; Baton Rouge, LA
February 20, 2010; 4:30 pm		Texas Southern	W 62-44	8-19 (7-7)	14 – Behling	5 – 3 Tied	5 – 2 Tied	Harrison HPER Complex; Itta Bena, MS
February 22, 2010; 7:30 pm		Prairie View A&M	L 68-69	8-20 (7-8)	17 – Behling	10 – Behling	6 – Burwell	Harrison HPER Complex; Itta Bena, MS
February 27, 2010; 5:30 pm		at Jackson State	L 51-63	8-21 (7-9)	10 – 2 Tied	8 – Behling	3 – Jackson	Williams Assembly Center; Jackson, MS
March 1, 2010; 7:30 pm		at Grambling State	W 65-61	9-21 (8-9)	18 – Cheeks	11 – Behling	10 – Burwell	Fredrick C. Hobdy Assembly Center; Grambling, LA
March 4, 2010; 8:15 pm		at Arkansas-Pine Bluff	L 68-84	9-22 (8-10)	33 – Cheeks	7 – Smith	5 – Burwell	H.O. Clemmons Arena; Pine Bluff, AR
SWAC men's basketball tournament
March 10, 2010; 2:30 pm	(7)	vs. (2) Arkansas-Pine Bluff; Quarterfinals	L 66-69	9-23	24 – Jackson	8 – 2 Tied	4 – Jackson	CenturyTel Center; Bossier City, LA
*Non-conference game. ^{#}Rankings from AP Poll. (#) Tournament seedings in parentheses. All times are in Central Time.
