= 2012–13 Alabama State Hornets basketball team =

American college basketball season

2012–13 Alabama State Hornets men's basketball
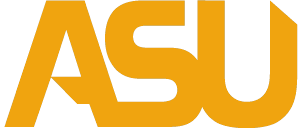
- Conference: Southwestern Athletic Conference
- Record: 10–22 (8–10 SWAC)
- Head coach: Lewis Jackson (8th season)
- Home arena: Dunn–Oliver Acadome

2012–13 SWAC men's basketball standings
	Conf.				Overall
Team	W		L	PCT	W		L	PCT
Texas Southern**	16	–	2	.889	17	–	14	.548
Southern †	15	–	3	.833	23	–	10	.697
Arkansas–Pine Bluff*	15	–	3	.833	16	–	14	.533
Jackson State	9	–	9	.500	11	–	18	.379
Prairie View A&M	8	–	10	.444	15	–	19	.441
Alabama State	8	–	10	.444	10	–	22	.313
Alcorn State	8	–	10	.444	10	–	24	.294
Alabama A&M	6	–	12	.333	11	–	20	.355
Mississippi Valley State*	5	–	13	.278	5	–	23	.179
Grambling State	0	–	18	.000	0	–	28	.000
† 2013 SWAC tournament winner As of March 21, 2013; *Ineligible for postseason play due to APR penalties **Ineligible for postseason play due to NCAA sanctions Rankings from AP Poll

The 2012–13 Alabama State Hornets basketball team represented Alabama State University during the 2012–13 NCAA Division I men's basketball season. The Hornets, led by eighth year head coach Lewis Jackson, played their home games at the Dunn–Oliver Acadome and were members of the Southwestern Athletic Conference. They finished the season 10–22, 8–10 in SWAC play to finish in a three way tie for fifth place. They lost in the quarterfinals of the SWAC tournament to Jackson State.

== Roster ==
Number	Name	Position	Height	Weight	Year	Hometown
0	Devonte' Neal	Center	6–10	220	Freshman	Memphis, Tennessee
2	Luther Page	Forward	6–6	190	Sophomore	Ann Arbor, Michigan
3	Josh Mason	Guard	6–4	170	Senior	Minneapolis
4	Josh Freelove	Guard	6–2	180	Junior	North Lauderdale, Florida
5	Bobby Brown	Guard/Forward	6–6	185	Freshman	Chicago, Illinois
10	Ryan Watts	Guard	6–0	170	Graduate	Conyers, Georgia
11	Phillip Crawford	Forward	6–7	210	Senior	Mobile, Alabama
12	Jamel Waters	Guard	5–9	160	Freshman	Birmingham, Alabama
13	Dominique Miller	Guard	6–5	215	Freshman	Hopkins, South Carolina
15	Jonathan Jefferson	Forward	6–6	200	Junior	Tuscaloosa, Alabama
21	Denzel McDaniel	Guard	6–3	185	Junior	Mobile, Alabama
22	Anthony Price	Guard	5–10	190	Senior	Tuscaloosa, Alabama
23	Shawntez Patterson	Forward	6–7	200	Senior	Detroit, Michigan
24	Stephawn Brown	Guard	6–4	190	Senior	Detroit, Michigan
25	Terrelle Green	Guard	6–2	190	Freshman	Chicago, Illinois
30	Kimani Key	Guard	6–0	170	Freshman	Birmingham, Alabama
35	Devin Jackson	Guard	6–2	165	Freshman	Huntsville, Alabama
40	Timothy Coleman	Forward/Center	6–10	220	Junior	Memphis, Tennessee
50	London Burris	Guard	5–9	160	Freshman	Muskegon, Michigan

== Schedule ==
Date time, TV	Opponent	Result	Record	Site (attendance) city, state
Exhibition
10/31/2012*; 6:00 pm	Huntingdon	W 90–73		Dunn–Oliver Acadome (1,526); Montgomery, Alabama
11/04/2012*; 6:00 pm	Fort Valley State	W 69–58		Dunn–Oliver Acadome (N/A); Montgomery, Alabama
Regular season
11/09/2012*; 7:45 pm	at Middle Tennessee; Global Sports Challenge	L 53–97	0–1	Murphy Center (5,806); Murfreesboro, Tennessee
11/11/2012*; 3:30 pm, Sun Sports/FS Florida	at No. 10 Florida; Global Sports Challenge	L 35–84	0–2	O'Connell Center (8,047); Gainesville, Florida
11/13/2012*; 7:00 pm	at UCF; Global Sports Challenge	L 56–85	0–3	UCF Arena (4,454); Orlando, Florida
11/16/2012*; 6:00 pm	Savannah State; Global Sports Challenge	L 54–59	0–4	Dunn–Oliver Acadome (1,236); Montgomery, Alabama
11/25/2012*; 2:00 pm	at Troy	L 62–66	0–5	Trojan Arena (767); Troy, Alabama
12/08/2012*; 2:05 pm	at Chicago State	L 54–67	0–6	Emil and Patricia Jones Convocation Center (379); Chicago
12/10/2012*; 6:30 pm	at Detroit	L 68–81	0–7	Calihan Hall (1,520); Detroit
12/13/2012*; 7:30 pm	Troy	W 74–68	1–7	Dunn–Oliver Acadome (N/A); Montgomery, Alabama
12/15/2012*; 1:05 pm	at Evansville	L 67–80	1–8	Ford Center (4,116); Evansville, Indiana
12/17/2012*; 6:00 pm, RSN/ESPN3	at Georgia Tech	L 41–75	1–9	McCamish Pavilion (6,203); Atlanta
12/19/2012*; 4:00 pm	vs. Pepperdine; Tulane Classic	L 58–66	1–10	Devlin Fieldhouse (1,502); New Orleans
12/20/2012*; 4:00 pm	vs. Texas–Pan American; Tulane Classic	L 70–76 ^{OT}	1–11	Devlin Fieldhouse (1,571); New Orleans, Louisiana
12/29/2012*; 4:00 pm	Auburn—Montgomery	W 73–50	2–11	Dunn–Oliver Acadome (400); Montgomery, Alabama
01/02/2013; 7:30 pm	Jackson State	W 70–66	3–11 (1–0)	Dunn–Oliver Acadome (524); Montgomery, Alabama
01/04/2013; 8:00 pm	Grambling State	W 69–56	4–11 (2–0)	Dunn–Oliver Acadome (724); Montgomery, Alabama
01/06/2013; 6:00 pm	at Arkansas–Pine Bluff	L 58–73	4–12 (2–1)	K. L. Johnson Complex (2,333); Pine Bluff, Arkansas
01/08/2013; 7:30 pm	at Mississippi Valley State	W 69–65	5–12 (3–1)	Harrison HPER Complex (952); Itta Bena, Mississippi
01/12/2013; 6:00 pm	at Alabama A&M	L 57–64	5–13 (3–2)	Elmore Gymnasium (3,449); Normal, Alabama
01/19/2013; 5:25 pm	Southern	L 67–79	5–14 (3–3)	Dunn–Oliver Acadome (1,224); Montgomery, Alabama
01/21/2013; 5:00 pm	Alcorn State	W 49–46	6–14 (4–3)	Dunn–Oliver Acadome (954); Montgomery, Alabama
01/26/2013; 5:30 pm	at Prairie View A&M	L 72–74	6–15 (4–4)	William Nicks Building (1,303); Prairie View, Texas
01/28/2013; 6:00 pm, ESPNU	at Texas Southern	L 65–97	6–16 (4–5)	Health and Physical Education Arena (2,287); Houston, Texas
02/02/2013; 5:40 pm	Arkansas-Pine Bluff	L 77–81	6–17 (4–6)	Dunn–Oliver Acadome (2,256); Montgomery, Alabama
02/04/2013; 7:50 pm	Mississippi Valley State	W 73–65	7–17 (5–6)	Dunn–Oliver Acadome (3,813); Montgomery, Alabama
02/09/2013; 5:30 pm	Alabama A&M	W 69–62	8–17 (6–6)	Dunn–Oliver Acadome (5,354); Montgomery, Alabama
02/16/2013; 4:20 pm	at Southern	L 49–58	8–18 (6–7)	F. G. Clark Center (1,849); Baton Rouge, Louisiana
02/18/2013; 8:15 pm	at Alcorn State	W 66–58	9–18 (7–7)	Davey Whitney Complex (700); Lorman, Mississippi
02/23/2013; 5:30 pm	Prairie View A&M	L 56–65	9–19 (7–8)	Dunn–Oliver Acadome (N/A); Montgomery, Alabama
02/25/2013; 7:50 pm	Texas Southern	L 50–70	9–20 (7–9)	Dunn–Oliver Acadome (876); Montgomery, Alabama
02/28/2013; 7:30 pm	at Jackson State	L 65–70 ^{OT}	9–21 (7–10)	Williams Assembly Center (945); Jackson, Mississippi
03/02/2013; 5:00 pm	at Grambling State	W 74–62	10–21 (8–10)	Fredrick C. Hobdy Assembly Center (2,350); Grambling, Louisiana
2013 SWAC Basketball tournament
03/14/2013; 12:30 pm	vs. Jackson State; Quarterfinals	L 59–66	10–22	Curtis Culwell Center (415); Garland, Texas
*Non-conference game. ^{#}Rankings from AP Poll. (#) Tournament seedings in parentheses. All times are in Central Time.
