= 2012–13 Jackson State Tigers basketball team =

American college basketball season

2012–13 Jackson State Tigers men's basketball
- Conference: Southwestern Athletic Conference
- Record: 11–18 (9–9 SWAC)
- Head coach: Tevester Anderson (10th season)
- Assistant coaches: Eric Strothers; Wright Busching; Mario Coleman
- Home arena: Williams Assembly Center

2012–13 SWAC men's basketball standings
	Conf.				Overall
Team	W		L	PCT	W		L	PCT
Texas Southern**	16	–	2	.889	17	–	14	.548
Southern †	15	–	3	.833	23	–	10	.697
Arkansas–Pine Bluff*	15	–	3	.833	16	–	14	.533
Jackson State	9	–	9	.500	11	–	18	.379
Prairie View A&M	8	–	10	.444	15	–	19	.441
Alabama State	8	–	10	.444	10	–	22	.313
Alcorn State	8	–	10	.444	10	–	24	.294
Alabama A&M	6	–	12	.333	11	–	20	.355
Mississippi Valley State*	5	–	13	.278	5	–	23	.179
Grambling State	0	–	18	.000	0	–	28	.000
† 2013 SWAC tournament winner As of March 21, 2013; *Ineligible for postseason play due to APR penalties **Ineligible for postseason play due to NCAA sanctions Rankings from AP Poll

The 2012–13 Jackson State Tigers basketball team represented Jackson State University during the 2012–13 NCAA Division I men's basketball season. The Tigers, led by tenth year head coach Tevester Anderson, played their home games at the Williams Assembly Center and were members of the Southwestern Athletic Conference. They finished the season 11–18, 9–9 in SWAC play to finish in fourth place. They advanced to the semifinals of the SWAC tournament where they lost to Prairie View A&M.

== Roster ==
Number	Name	Position	Height	Weight	Year	Hometown
1	Emmanuel Donald	Guard	6–6	190	Junior	Lake, Mississippi
2	Derrell Taylor	Guard	6–5	195	Sophomore	Morton, Mississippi
3	Kendall Deese	Guard	6–1	175	Freshman	Murray, Kentucky
4	Jeff Stubbs	Guard	6–1	165	Junior	Jackson, Mississippi
10	Travis Ballard	Guard	5–10	175	Senior	Moreno Valley, California
11	Keeslee Stewart	Guard	5–9	165	Sophomore	Edwards, Mississippi
12	Kelsey Howard	Guard	6–4	190	Sophomore	Vicksburg, Mississippi
13	Christian Williams	Guard	6–1	180	Senior	Manteca, California
15	Jonathan Lewis	Guard	5–10	180	Senior	Jackson, Mississippi
20	Sydney Coleman	Forward	6–7	215	Sophomore	Meridian, Mississippi
21	Phillip Williams	Guard	6–1	195	Senior	Gary, Indiana
22	Kenny Demouchet	Guard/Forward	6–4	200	Senior	Opelousas, Louisiana
25	Davon Jones	Forward/Center	6–8	230	Senior	Detroit, Michigan
32	Willie Readus	Forward	6–6	260	Junior	Morton, Mississippi
35	Josh Armstrong	Forward	6–6	185	Junior	St. Louis, Missouri
44	Raymond Gregory	Center	6–9	255	Senior	Plainfield, New Jersey

== Schedule ==
Date time, TV	Opponent	Result	Record	Site (attendance) city, state
Exhibition
11/01/2012*; 7:30 pm	Miles	W 68–54		Williams Assembly Center; Jackson, Mississippi
Regular season
11/11/2012*; 4:00 pm, FS Southwest	at No. 16 Baylor	L 47–78	0–1	Ferrell Center (5,846); Waco, Texas
11/21/2012*; 7:00 pm	at Tulsa	L 66–86	0–2	Reynolds Center (4,134); Tulsa, Oklahoma
11/26/2012*; 8:00 pm, FS Southwest/FCS Atlantic	at Texas Tech	L 75–84	0–3	United Spirit Arena (7,404); Lubbock, Texas
11/28/2012*; 7:00 pm	at Air Force	L 47–76	0–4	Clune Arena (1,547); Colorado Springs, Colorado
12/08/2012*; 7:00 pm	at North Texas	L 65–83	0–5	UNT Coliseum (2,872); Denton, Texas
12/11/2012*; 9:00 pm	at Saint Mary's	L 67–120	0–6	McKeon Pavilion (2,033); Moraga, California
12/13/2012*; 9:00 pm, Pac-12 Network	at Washington State	L 41–52	0–7	Beasley Coliseum (2,686); Pullman, Washington
12/15/2012*; 6:00 pm, Pac-12 Network	at Washington	L 67–75	0–8	Alaska Airlines Arena (7,836); Seattle
12/17/2012*; 9:00 pm	at Seattle	W 91–82	1–8	KeyArena (1,907); Seattle
01/02/2013; 7:30 pm	at Alabama State	L 66–70	1–9 (0–1)	Dunn–Oliver Acadome (524); Montgomery, Alabama
01/04/2013; 8:00 pm	at Alabama A&M	L 87–88 ^{2OT}	1–10 (0–2)	Elmore Gymnasium; Normal, Alabama
01/06/2013; 5:30 pm	Alcorn State	L 48–51	1–11 (0–3)	Williams Assembly Center (798); Jackson, Mississippi
01/08/2013; 7:30 pm	Southern	L 67–80	1–12 (0–4)	Williams Assembly Center (729); Jackson, Mississippi
01/12/2013; 8:00 pm	at Texas Southern	L 57–84	1–13 (0–5)	Health and Physical Education Arena (916); Houston
01/14/2013; 8:00 pm, ESPNU	at Prairie View A&M	L 59–73	1–14 (0–6)	William Nicks Building (3,212); Prairie View, Texas
01/19/2013; 5:30 pm	at Grambling State	W 57–46	2–14 (1–6)	Fredrick C. Hobdy Assembly Center (1,472); Grambling, Louisiana
01/26/2013; 7:30 pm	Mississippi Valley State	W 60–57	3–14 (2–6)	Williams Assembly Center (6,315); Jackson, Mississippi
01/28/2013; 7:30 pm	Arkansas–Pine Bluff	W 82–67	4–14 (3–6)	Williams Assembly Center (1,055); Jackson, Mississippi
02/02/2013; 5:00 pm	at Alcorn State	W 84–71	5–14 (4–6)	Davey Whitney Complex (3,100); Lorman, Mississippi
02/04/2013; 8:00 pm	at Southern	L 58–78	5–15 (4–7)	F. G. Clark Center (2,722); Baton Rouge, Louisiana
02/09/2013; 5:30 pm	Texas Southern	L 54–61	5–16 (4–8)	Williams Assembly Center (401); Jackson, Mississippi
02/11/2013; 7:50 pm	Prairie View A&M	W 65–60	6–16 (5–8)	Williams Assembly Center (402); Jackson, Mississippi
02/16/2013; 5:30 pm	Grambling State	W 77–38	7–16 (6–8)	Williams Assembly Center (799); Jackson, Mississippi
02/23/2013; 5:00 pm	at Mississippi Valley State	W 90–71	8–16 (7–8)	Harrison HPER Complex (4,929); Itta Bena, Mississippi
02/25/2013; 8:20 pm	at Arkansas–Pine Bluff	L 72–73	8–17 (7–9)	K. L. Johnson Complex (3,026); Pine Bluff, Arkansas
02/28/2013; 7:30 pm	Alabama State	W 70–65 ^{OT}	9–17 (8–9)	Williams Assembly Center (945); Jackson, Mississippi
03/02/2013; 5:30 pm	Alabama A&M	W 60–57	10–17 (9–9)	Williams Assembly Center (797); Jackson, Mississippi
2013 SWAC Basketball tournament
03/14/2013; 12:30 pm	vs. Alabama State; Quarterfinals	W 66–59	11–17	Curtis Culwell Center (415); Garland, Texas
03/15/2013; 2:30 pm	vs. Prairie View A&M; Semifinals	L 75–88	11–18	Curtis Culwell Center (595); Garland, Texas
*Non-conference game. ^{#}Rankings from AP Poll. (#) Tournament seedings in parentheses. All times are in Central Time.
