= 2012–13 Mississippi Valley State Delta Devils basketball team =

American college basketball season

2012–13 Mississippi Valley State Delta Devils men's basketball
- Conference: Southwestern Athletic Conference
- Record: 5–23 (5–13 SWAC)
- Head coach: Chico Potts (1st season)
- Assistant coaches: Marcus Thomas; Richard Cannon
- Home arena: Harrison HPER Complex

2012–13 SWAC men's basketball standings
	Conf.				Overall
Team	W		L	PCT	W		L	PCT
Texas Southern**	16	–	2	.889	17	–	14	.548
Southern †	15	–	3	.833	23	–	10	.697
Arkansas–Pine Bluff*	15	–	3	.833	16	–	14	.533
Jackson State	9	–	9	.500	11	–	18	.379
Prairie View A&M	8	–	10	.444	15	–	19	.441
Alabama State	8	–	10	.444	10	–	22	.313
Alcorn State	8	–	10	.444	10	–	24	.294
Alabama A&M	6	–	12	.333	11	–	20	.355
Mississippi Valley State*	5	–	13	.278	5	–	23	.179
Grambling State	0	–	18	.000	0	–	28	.000
† 2013 SWAC tournament winner As of March 21, 2013; *Ineligible for postseason play due to APR penalties **Ineligible for postseason play due to NCAA sanctions Rankings from AP Poll

The 2012–13 Mississippi Valley State Delta Devils basketball team represented Mississippi Valley State University during the 2012–13 NCAA Division I men's basketball season. The Delta Devils, led by first year head coach Chico Potts, played their home games at the Harrison HPER Complex and were members of the Southwestern Athletic Conference.

Due to low Academic Progress Rate scores, the Delta Devils were ineligible to participate in the post season, including the SWAC Tournament. One year after winning the SWAC and participating in the NCAA Tournament, they finished the season 5–23, 5–13 in SWAC play to finish in ninth place.

== Roster ==
Number	Name	Position	Height	Weight	Year	Hometown
0	Davon Usher	Guard	6–6	209	Junior	South Baltimore, Maryland
1	Matt Smith	Guard	6–4	181	Freshman	Jackson, Tennessee
2	Jordan Washington	Guard	5–10	174	Freshman	Memphis, Tennessee
3	Darryl Marshall	Guard	5–11	167	Junior	Memphis, Tennessee
11	Cameron Dobbs	Guard	6–0	173	Freshman	Albany, New York
12	Cordarius Samples	Guard	6–3	206	Freshman	Birmingham, Alabama
13	Cortland Henry	Guard	6–2	194	Junior	Selma, Alabama
21	Nate Brandt	Forward	6–6	189	Sophomore	Burlington, Wisconsin
22	Blake Ralling	Forward	6–6	211	Sophomore	Smyrna, Georgia
24	Arthur Framery	Guard	6–3	185	Freshman	Paris, France
25	Darius Tomlin	Guard	5–10	170	Freshman	Jackson, Tennessee
31	Julius Francis	Center	6–11	255	Junior	Gaithersburg, Maryland
42	Montreal Holley	Center	7–0	263	Junior	Montgomery, Alabama

== Schedule ==
Date time, TV	Opponent	Result	Record	Site (attendance) city, state
Exhibition
11/01/2012*; 7:00 pm	Delta State	W 62–59		Harrison HPER Complex; Itta Bena, MS
11/06/2012*; 7:00 pm	Victory	W 89–86		Harrison HPER Complex; Itta Bena, MS
Regular Season
11/09/2012*; 8:00 pm	at Ole Miss	L 57–93	0–1	Tad Smith Coliseum (4,992); Oxford, MS
11/13/2012*; 6:00 pm, ESPN3	at No. 24 Cincinnati	L 60–102	0–2	Fifth Third Arena (5,617); Cincinnati, OH
11/15/2012*; 7:00 pm	at Northwestern	L 68–81	0–3	Welsh-Ryan Arena (5,004); Evanston, IL
11/24/2012*; 7:00 pm, CST/ESPN3	at LSU	L 50–75	0–4	Pete Maravich Assembly Center (6,237); Baton Rouge, LA
12/08/2012*; 3:00 pm, ESPN3	at Virginia	L 39–67	0–5	John Paul Jones Arena (8,691); Charlottesville, VA
12/10/2012*; 6:00 pm, ESPN3	at Virginia Tech; Las Vegas Classic	L 49–70	0–6	Cassell Coliseum (4,926); Blacksburg, VA
12/19/2012*; 7:00 pm	at Bradley; Las Vegas Classic	L 42–77	0–7	Carver Arena (6,066); Peoria, IL
12/22/2012*; 2:00 pm	vs. Georgia Southern; Las Vegas Classic	L 52–63	0–8	Orleans Arena (N/A); Paradise, NV
12/23/2012*; 2:45 pm	vs. Cal State Bakersfield; Las Vegas Classic	L 64–69	0–9	Orleans Arena (N/A); Paradise, NV
12/30/2012*; 3:00 pm, FSSW	at TCU	L 64–67	0–10	Daniel-Meyer Coliseum (3,868); Ft. Worth, TX
01/02/2013; 7:30 pm	at Arkansas–Pine Bluff	L 64–79	0–11 (0–1)	K. L. Johnson Complex (1,651); Pine Bluff, AR
01/06/2013; 7:30 pm	Alabama A&M	W 79–68	1–11 (1–1)	Harrison HPER Complex (1,076); Itta Bena, MS
01/08/2013; 7:30 pm	Alabama State	L 65–69	1–12 (1–2)	Harrison HPER Complex (952); Itta Bena, MS
01/12/2013; 5:00 pm	at Alcorn State	L 67–72	1–13 (1–3)	Davey Whitney Complex (1,100); Lorman, MS
01/14/2013; 8:00 pm	at Southern	L 54–88	1–14 (1–4)	F. G. Clark Center (1,641); Baton Rouge, LA
01/19/2013; 5:30 pm	Prairie View A&M	W 73–64	2–14 (2–4)	Harrison HPER Complex (2,108); Itta Bena, MS
01/21/2013; 7:30 pm	Texas Southern	L 48–75	2–15 (2–5)	Harrison HPER Complex (2,019); Itta Bena, MS
01/26/2013; 7:30 pm	at Jackson State	L 57–60	2–16 (2–6)	Williams Assembly Center (6,315); Jackson, MS
01/28/2013; 7:30 pm	at Grambling State	W 65–50	3–16 (3–6)	Fredrick C. Hobdy Assembly Center (1,234); Grambling, LA
02/02/2013; 5:30 pm	at Alabama A&M	L 64–65	3–17 (3–7)	Elmore Gymnasium (728); Normal, AL
02/04/2013; 7:50 pm	at Alabama State	L 65–73	3–18 (3–8)	Dunn–Oliver Acadome (3,813); Montgomery, AL
02/09/2013; 5:00 pm	Alcorn State	W 80–75	4–18 (4–8)	Harrison HPER Complex (4,120); Itta Bena, MS
02/11/2013; 7:50 pm	Southern	L 74–78	4–19 (4–9)	Harrison HPER Complex (3,014); Itta Bena, MS
02/16/2013; 5:20 pm	at Prairie View A&M	L 77–80	4–20 (4–10)	William Nicks Building (765); Prairie View, TX
02/18/2013; 8:00 pm	at Texas Southern	L 57–73	4–21 (4–11)	Health and Physical Education Arena (650); Houston, TX
02/23/2013; 5:00 pm	Jackson State	L 71–90	4–22 (4–12)	Harrison HPER Complex (4,929); Itta Bena, MS
02/25/2013; 7:30 pm	Grambling State	W 90–68	5–22 (5–12)	Harrison HPER Complex (1,468); Itta Bena, MS
02/28/2013; 7:30 pm	Arkansas-Pine Bluff	L 70–78 ^{OT}	5–23 (5–13)	Harrison HPER Complex (2,073); Itta Bena, MS
*Non-conference game. ^{#}Rankings from AP Poll. (#) Tournament seedings in parentheses. All times are in Central Time.
