= 2012–13 Prairie View A&M Panthers basketball team =

American college basketball season

2012–13 Prairie View A&M Panthers men's basketball
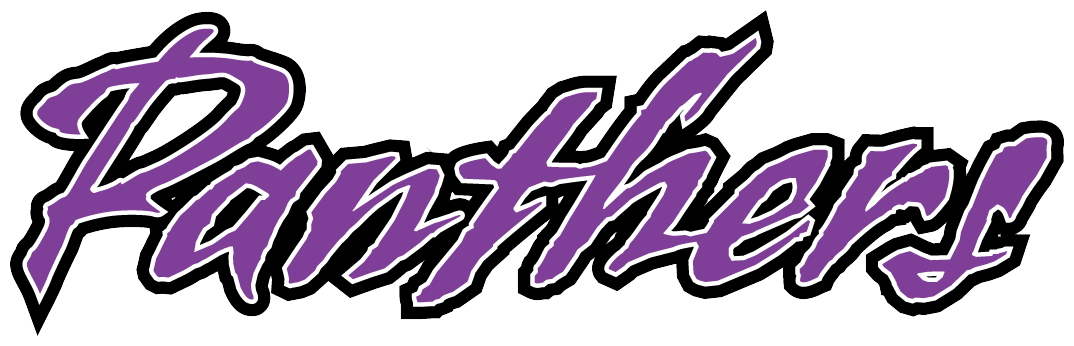
- Conference: Southwestern Athletic Conference
- Record: 15–19 (8–10 SWAC)
- Head coach: Byron Rimm II (7th season)
- Assistant coaches: Jethro Hillman; Ansar Al-Ameen; Randy Washington
- Home arena: William Nicks Building

2012–13 SWAC men's basketball standings
	Conf.				Overall
Team	W		L	PCT	W		L	PCT
Texas Southern**	16	–	2	.889	17	–	14	.548
Southern †	15	–	3	.833	23	–	10	.697
Arkansas–Pine Bluff*	15	–	3	.833	16	–	14	.533
Jackson State	9	–	9	.500	11	–	18	.379
Prairie View A&M	8	–	10	.444	15	–	19	.441
Alabama State	8	–	10	.444	10	–	22	.313
Alcorn State	8	–	10	.444	10	–	24	.294
Alabama A&M	6	–	12	.333	11	–	20	.355
Mississippi Valley State*	5	–	13	.278	5	–	23	.179
Grambling State	0	–	18	.000	0	–	28	.000
† 2013 SWAC tournament winner As of March 21, 2013; *Ineligible for postseason play due to APR penalties **Ineligible for postseason play due to NCAA sanctions Rankings from AP Poll

The 2012–13 Prairie View A&M Panthers basketball team represented Prairie View A&M University during the 2012–13 NCAA Division I men's basketball season. The Panthers, led by seventh year head coach Byron Rimm II, played their home games at the William Nicks Building and were members of the Southwestern Athletic Conference. They finished the season 15–19, 8–10 in SWAC play to finish in a three-way tie for fifth place. They advanced to the championship game of the SWAC tournament where they lost to Southern.

== Roster ==
Number	Name	Position	Height	Weight	Year	Hometown
0	Josh Eleby	Forward	6–10	255	Junior	Houston, Texas
1	Jourdan DeMuynck	Guard	6–6	205	Senior	San Leandro, California
2	Ronald Wright	Guard	6–1	190	Senior	Jacksonville, Florida
3	Louis Munks	Guard	6–3	200	Junior	Arlington, Texas
4	Babajidne Aina	Guard	6–2	180	Freshman	Garland, Texas
5	John Love	Guard	6–0	170	Sophomore	Jacksonville, Florida
10	Cory Jones	Forward	6–4	180	Freshman	Katy, Texas
11	Wesley Afolayan	Forward	6–6	189	Freshman	Houston, Texas
13	Jimmie Duplessis	Guard	6–4	210	Sophomore	New Orleans, Louisiana
14	Carl Blair	Guard	6–2	205	Senior	Houston, Texas
15	Patrick Agho	Forward	6–8	205	Junior	Houston, Texas
20	Jules Montgomery	Forward	6–11	220	Junior	West Hills, California
22	Rasi Jenkins	Forward	6–8	215	Junior	Brooklyn, New York
24	Ryan Gesiakowski	Guard	6–4	195	Senior	Albuquerque, New Mexico
31	Montrael Scott	Guard	6–3	195	Sophomore	Dallas
32	Demondre Chapman	Forward	6–7	220	Junior	Flint, Michigan
33	Mayol Riathin	Center	6–9	215	Senior	Sudan

== Schedule ==
Date time, TV	Opponent	Result	Record	Site (attendance) city, state
Regular season
11/09/2012*; 8:00 pm, FCS Atlantic	at Texas Tech	L 79–89	0–1	United Spirit Arena (8,550); Lubbock, Texas
11/11/2012*; 4:00 pm	Schreiner	W 80–51	1–1	William Nicks Building (1,175); Prairie View, Texas
11/13/2012*; 7:00 pm	Arlington Baptist	W 91–38	2–1	William Nicks Building (2,887); Prairie View, Texas
11/15/2012*; 7:00 pm, FS Southwest	at Texas A&M	L 59–81	2–2	Reed Arena (4,201); College Station, Texas
11/18/2012*; 4:00 pm, FS Southwest/FCS Central	at TCU; South Padre Island Invitational	L 39–44	2–3	Daniel-Meyer Coliseum (3,839); Fort Worth, Texas
11/20/2012*; 8:00 pm	at UAB; South Padre Island Invitational	L 70–76	2–4	Bartow Arena (3,391); Birmingham, Alabama
11/23/2012*; 3:30 pm	vs. Navy; South Padre Island Invitational	W 42–40	3–4	South Padre Island Convention Centre (N/A); South Padre Island, Texas
11/24/2012*; 1:15 pm	vs. Fairleigh Dickinson; South Padre Island Invitational	L 70–84	3–5	South Padre Island Convention Centre (N/A); South Padre Island, Texas
11/28/2012*; 8:00 pm	Houston	W 81–80	4–5	William Nicks Building (4,900); Prairie View, Texas
12/07/2012*; 8:00 pm	Dallas Christian	W 107–59	5–5	William Nicks Building (1,887); Prairie View, Texas
12/15/2012*; 8:00 pm, Pac-12 Network	at UCLA	L 53–95	5–6	Pauley Pavilion (6,351); Los Angeles
12/22/2012*; 4:00 pm, Pac-12 Network	at California	L 53–85	5–7	Haas Pavilion (5,427); Berkeley, California
12/29/2012*; 3:00 pm	at Houston	L 75–80	5–8	Hofheinz Pavilion (3,437); Houston, Texas
01/02/2013; 7:30 pm	at Alcorn State	L 54–68	5–9 (0–1)	Davey Whitney Complex (150); Lorman, Mississippi
01/04/2013; 7:30 pm	at Southern	L 45–50	5–10 (0–2)	F. G. Clark Center (1,668); Baton Rouge, Louisiana
01/06/2013; 7:00 pm	Texas Southern	L 60–65	5–11 (0–3)	William Nicks Building (2,877); Prairie View, Texas
01/12/2013; 5:25 pm	Grambling State	W 60–44	6–11 (1–3)	William Nicks Building (1,138); Prairie View, Texas
01/14/2013; 8:00 pm, ESPNU	Jackson State	W 73–59	7–11 (2–3)	William Nicks Building (3,212); Prairie View, Texas
01/19/2013; 5:30 pm	at Mississippi Valley State	L 64–73	7–12 (2–4)	Harrison HPER Complex (2,108); Itta Bena, Mississippi
01/21/2013; 7:30 pm	at Arkansas–Pine Bluff	L 51–55	7–13 (2–5)	K. L. Johnson Complex (3,173); Pine Bluff, Arkansas
01/26/2013; 5:30 pm	Alabama State	W 74–72	8–13 (3–5)	William Nicks Building (1,303); Prairie View, Texas
01/28/2013; 7:30 pm	Alabama A&M	W 65–46	9–13 (4–5)	William Nicks Building (1,765); Prairie View, Texas
02/02/2013; 8:00 pm	at Texas Southern	L 48–84	9–14 (4–6)	Health and Physical Education Arena (8,024); Houston
02/09/2013; 5:00 pm	at Grambling State	W 63–53	10–14 (5–6)	Fredrick C. Hobdy Assembly Center (1,123); Grambling, Louisiana
02/11/2013; 7:50 pm	at Jackson State	L 60–65	10–15 (5–7)	Williams Assembly Center (402); Jackson, Mississippi
02/16/2013; 5:20 pm	Mississippi Valley State	W 80–77	11–15 (6–7)	William Nicks Building (765); Prairie View, Texas
02/18/2013; 8:00 pm	Arkansas–Pine Bluff	L 47–76	11–16 (6–8)	William Nicks Building (1,412); Prairie View, Texas
02/23/2013; 5:30 pm	at Alabama State	W 65–56	12–16 (7–8)	Dunn–Oliver Acadome (N/A); Montgomery, Alabama
02/25/2013; 7:30 pm	at Alabama A&M	W 61–57 ^{OT}	13–16 (8–8)	Elmore Gymnasium (912); Normal, Alabama
02/28/2013; 7:30 pm	Alcorn State	L 75–81	13–17 (8–9)	William Nicks Building (1,312); Prairie View, Texas
03/02/2013; 5:00 pm	Southern	L 39–61	13–18 (8–10)	William Nicks Building (1,112); Prairie View, Texas
2013 SWAC Basketball tournament
03/14/2013; 8:00 pm	vs. Alcorn State; Quarterfinals	W 67–59	14–18	Curtis Culwell Center (605); Garland, Texas
03/15/2013; 2:30 pm	vs. Jackson State; Semifinals	W 88–75	15–18	Curtis Culwell Center (595); Garland, Texas
03/16/2013; 3:30 pm, ESPN2	vs. Southern; Championship Game	L 44–45	15–19	Curtis Culwell Center (2,030); Garland, Texas
*Non-conference game. ^{#}Rankings from AP Poll. (#) Tournament seedings in parentheses. All times are in Central Time.
