= 2012–13 Grambling State Tigers men's basketball team =

American college basketball season

2012–13 Grambling State Tigers men's basketball
- Conference: Southwestern Athletic Conference
- Record: 0–28 (0–18 SWAC)
- Head coach: Joseph Price (1st season)
- Assistant coaches: Allen Odum; Ray Martin; Mario Coleman
- Home arena: Fredrick C. Hobdy Assembly Center

2012–13 SWAC men's basketball standings
	Conf.				Overall
Team	W		L	PCT	W		L	PCT
Texas Southern**	16	–	2	.889	17	–	14	.548
Southern †	15	–	3	.833	23	–	10	.697
Arkansas–Pine Bluff*	15	–	3	.833	16	–	14	.533
Jackson State	9	–	9	.500	11	–	18	.379
Prairie View A&M	8	–	10	.444	15	–	19	.441
Alabama State	8	–	10	.444	10	–	22	.313
Alcorn State	8	–	10	.444	10	–	24	.294
Alabama A&M	6	–	12	.333	11	–	20	.355
Mississippi Valley State*	5	–	13	.278	5	–	23	.179
Grambling State	0	–	18	.000	0	–	28	.000
† 2013 SWAC tournament winner As of March 21, 2013; *Ineligible for postseason play due to APR penalties **Ineligible for postseason play due to NCAA sanctions Rankings from AP Poll

The 2012–13 Grambling State Tigers men's basketball team represented Grambling State University during the 2012–13 NCAA Division I men's basketball season. The Tigers, led by first year head coach Joseph Price, played their home games at the Fredrick C. Hobdy Assembly Center and were members of the Southwestern Athletic Conference. They finished the season 0–28, 0–18 in SWAC play to finish in last place. They lost in the quarterfinals of the SWAC tournament to Alabama A&M to become the eighth Division I team in NCAA history to finish a season winless.

The 2012-2013 Grambling State Tigers men's basketball team holds the distinction of being the worst team ever tracked by Ken Pomeroy's Adjusted Efficiency Margin with a net rating of -46.10.

== Roster ==
Number	Name	Position	Height	Weight	Year	Hometown
0	Derron Hobbs	Guard	6–0	170	Senior	St. Louis, Missouri
2	Will Hornsby	Guard	6–2	185	Freshman	Slidell, Louisiana
3	Carl Cobbins	Guard	6–0	185	Senior	New Orleans, Louisiana
4	Justin Dobbs	Guard	6–2	195	Freshman	Pittsburgh, Pennsylvania
5	Brandon Dorsett	Guard	6–0	170	Sophomore	Greensboro, North Carolina
10	David Copeland	Guard	6–0	190	Sophomore	Chesterfield, Virginia
20	Terry Rose	Guard/Forward	6–4	195	Freshman	Davenport, Florida
22	Brauhnye' Turner	Forward	6–4	205	Freshman	Grambling, Louisiana
32	Roman Higgins	Guard/Forward	6–4	200	Sophomore	Grambling, Louisiana
40	Peter Roberson	Center	7–0	245	Senior	Oklahoma City, Oklahoma
42	Steven Danridge	Forward/Center	6–8	260	Junior	Dolton, Illinois

== Schedule ==
Date time, TV	Opponent	Result	Record	Site (attendance) city, state
Regular season
11/09/2012*; 6:30 pm	at Cleveland State	L 49–92	0–1	Wolstein Center (4,127); Cleveland, OH
11/11/2012*; 1:00 pm	at Ball State	L 51–78	0–2	John E. Worthen Arena (3,141); Muncie, IN
11/13/2012*; 6:00 pm	at Miami (OH)	L 54–80	0–3	Millett Hall (1,708); Oxford, OH
11/17/2012*; 7:00 pm	at Houston	L 47–87	0–4	Hofheinz Pavilion (3,178); Houston, TX
11/20/2012*; 8:00 pm, FSSW+/FCS Pacific	at Texas Tech	L 56–91	0–5	United Spirit Arena (7,952); Lubbock, TX
12/08/2012*; 3:00 pm, Pac-12 Network	at Oregon State	L 54–85	0–6	Gill Coliseum (3,291); Corvallis, OR
12/11/2012*; 7:00 pm	at Auburn	L 42–92	0–7	Auburn Arena (4,314); Auburn, AL
12/15/2012*; 6:30 pm	at Southern Miss	L 45–93	0–8	Reed Green Coliseum (3,297); Hattiesburg, MS
12/20/2012*; 7:00 pm	at Stephen F. Austin	L 38–60	0–9	William R. Johnson Coliseum (1,104); Nacogdoches, TX
01/02/2013; 7:45 pm	at Alabama A&M	L 53–78	0–10 (0–1)	Elmore Gymnasium (489); Normal, AL
01/04/2013; 8:00 pm	at Alabama State	L 56–69	0–11 (0–2)	Dunn–Oliver Acadome (724); Montgomery, AL
01/06/2013; 7:30 pm	Southern	L 43–82	0–12 (0–3)	Fredrick C. Hobdy Assembly Center (N/A); Grambling, LA
01/08/2013; 7:30 pm	Alcorn State	L 46–80	0–13 (0–4)	Fredrick C. Hobdy Assembly Center (832); Grambling, LA
01/12/2013; 5:25 pm	at Prairie View A&M	L 44–60	0–14 (0–5)	William Nicks Building (1,138); Prairie View, TX
01/14/2013; 8:00 pm	at Texas Southern	L 50–95	0–15 (0–6)	Health and Physical Education Arena (1,836); Houston, TX
01/19/2013; 5:30 pm	Jackson State	L 46–57	0–16 (0–7)	Fredrick C. Hobdy Assembly Center (1,472); Grambling, LA
01/26/2013; 5:00 pm	Arkansas–Pine Bluff	L 67–79	0–17 (0–8)	Fredrick C. Hobdy Assembly Center (1,384); Grambling, LA
01/28/2013; 7:30 pm	Mississippi Valley State	L 50–65	0–18 (0–9)	Fredrick C. Hobdy Assembly Center (1,234); Grambling, LA
02/02/2013; 5:00 pm	at Southern	L 31–59	0–19 (0–10)	F. G. Clark Center (4,800); Baton Rouge, LA
02/04/2013; 7:30 pm	at Alcorn State	L 53–78	0–20 (0–11)	Davey Whitney Complex (3,500); Lorman, MS
02/09/2013; 5:00 pm	Prairie View A&M	L 53–63	0–21 (0–12)	Fredrick C. Hobdy Assembly Center (1,123); Grambling, LA
02/11/2013; 7:30 pm	Texas Southern	L 52–80	0–22 (0–13)	Fredrick C. Hobdy Assembly Center (1,356); Grambling, LA
02/16/2013; 5:30 pm	at Jackson State	L 38–77	0–23 (0–14)	Williams Assembly Center (799); Jackson, MS
02/23/2013; 7:30 pm	at Arkansas–Pine Bluff	L 45–61	0–24 (0–15)	K. L. Johnson Complex (5,047); Pine Bluff, AR
02/25/2013; 7:30 pm	at Mississippi Valley State	L 68–90	0–25 (0–16)	Harrison HPER Complex (1,468); Itta Bena, MS
02/28/2013; 7:30 pm	Alabama A&M	L 47–74	0–26 (0–17)	Fredrick C. Hobdy Assembly Center (N/A); Grambling, LA
03/02/2013; 5:00 pm	Alabama State	L 62–74	0–27 (0–18)	Fredrick C. Hobdy Assembly Center (2,350); Grambling, LA
2013 SWAC Basketball tournament
03/13/2013; 8:00 pm	vs. Alabama A&M; Quarterfinals	L 51–59	0–28	Garland Special Events Center (425); Garland, TX
*Non-conference game. ^{#}Rankings from AP Poll. (#) Tournament seedings in parentheses. All times are in Central Time.
