= 2012–13 Alcorn State Braves basketball team =

American college basketball season

2012–13 Alcorn State Braves men's basketball
- Conference: Southwestern Athletic Conference
- Record: 10–24 (8–10 SWAC)
- Head coach: Luther Riley
- Assistant coaches: Christopher Giles; Joezon Darby
- Home arena: Davey Whitney Complex

2012–13 SWAC men's basketball standings
	Conf.				Overall
Team	W		L	PCT	W		L	PCT
Texas Southern**	16	–	2	.889	17	–	14	.548
Southern †	15	–	3	.833	23	–	10	.697
Arkansas–Pine Bluff*	15	–	3	.833	16	–	14	.533
Jackson State	9	–	9	.500	11	–	18	.379
Prairie View A&M	8	–	10	.444	15	–	19	.441
Alabama State	8	–	10	.444	10	–	22	.313
Alcorn State	8	–	10	.444	10	–	24	.294
Alabama A&M	6	–	12	.333	11	–	20	.355
Mississippi Valley State*	5	–	13	.278	5	–	23	.179
Grambling State	0	–	18	.000	0	–	28	.000
† 2013 SWAC tournament winner As of March 21, 2013; *Ineligible for postseason play due to APR penalties **Ineligible for postseason play due to NCAA sanctions Rankings from AP Poll

The 2012–13 Alcorn State Braves basketball team represented Alcorn State University during the 2012–13 NCAA Division I men's basketball season. The Braves, led by head coach Luther Riley, played their home games at the Davey Whitney Complex and were members of the Southwestern Athletic Conference. They finished the season 10–24, 8–10 in SWAC play to finish in a three way tie for fifth place. They lost in the quarterfinals of the SWAC tournament to Prairie View A&M.

== Roster ==
Number	Name	Position	Height	Weight	Year	Hometown
0	Tyrel Hunt	Guard	6–6	202	Freshman	Queens, New York
1	Clint Nwosuh	Guard	6–2	195	Freshman	Houston, Texas
2	Twann Oakley	Guard	6–4	195	Senior	Memphis, Tennessee
3	Anthony Evans	Guard	6–1	175	Junior	Greenville, Mississippi
4	Larry Johnson	Guard	6–1	165	Freshman	Greenwood, Mississippi
5	Marquiz Baker	Guard	6–2	200	Senior	Austin, Texas
10	Devonte Hampton	Forward	6–2	175	Freshman	Memphis, Tennessee
11	Martrevious Sanders	Guard	5–11	175	Senior	Tunica, Mississippi
12	Anthony Nieves	Guard	6–4	185	Senior	Bronx, New York
15	LeAntwan Luckett	Guard	6–5	180	Sophomore	Ridgeland, Mississippi
21	Josh Nicholas	Forward/Center	7–0	225	Junior	Fort Myers, Florida
22	Terrance Birdie	Guard	6–0	175	Freshman	Dallas
24	Ian Francis	Forward	6–8	225	Senior	Los Angeles
25	Jamaal Hester	Forward	6–8	260	Freshman	Ridgeland, Mississippi
32	Michael Starks	Forward	6–8	230	Senior	Belzoni, Mississippi
34	Stephane Raquil	Forward/Center	6–10	220	Junior	Shreveport, Louisiana
40	Marius Myles	Forward	6–2	165	Junior	Jackson, Mississippi
44	McDarion Abron	Center	6–11	285	Freshman	Canton, Mississippi

== Schedule ==
Date time, TV	Opponent	Result	Record	Site (attendance) city, state
Regular season
11/11/2012*; 2:00 pm	Oakwood	W 85–41	1–0	Davey Whitney Complex (200); Lorman, Mississippi
11/13/2012*; 7:00 pm, FS Midwest	at No. 14 Missouri; Battle 4 Atlantis	L 54–91	1–1	Mizzou Arena (8,013); Columbia, Missouri
11/15/2012*; 8:00 pm, Pac-12 Network	at Stanford; Battle 4 Atlantis	L 51–69	1–2	Maples Pavilion (4,028); Stanford, California
11/19/2012*; 7:00 pm	Fort Valley State	L 78–86	1–3	Davey Whitney Complex (N/A); Lorman, Mississippi
11/21/2012*; 6:05 pm	at Florida Gulf Coast; Battle 4 Atlantis	L 48–50	1–4	Alico Arena (1,370); Fort Myers, Florida
11/22/2012*; 3:30 pm	vs. Samford; Battle 4 Atlantis	W 69–65 ^{OT}	2–4	Alico Arena (676); Fort Myers, Florida
11/27/2012*; 7:00 pm	at Mississippi State	L 42–60	2–5	Humphrey Coliseum (6,101); Starkville, Mississippi
12/01/2012*; 3:00 pm	Jacksonville State	L 52–56	2–6	Davey Whitney Complex (424); Lorman, Mississippi
12/15/2012*; 7:00 pm, ESPN3	at Arkansas	L 59–97	2–7	Bud Walton Arena (12,484); Fayetteville, Arkansas
12/17/2012*; 6:00 pm	at Temple; Gotham Classic	L 46–63	2–8	Liacouras Center (3,435); Philadelphia
12/19/2012*; 2:00 pm	Detroit; Gotham Classic	L 58–74	2–9	Davey Whitney Complex (50); Lorman, Mississippi
12/21/2012*; 10:15 pm	at Santa Clara; Cable Car Classic	L 58–70	2–10	Leavey Center (1,530); Santa Clara, California
12/22/2012*; 8:00 pm	vs. SMU; Cable Car Classic	L 52–67	2–11	Leavey Center (1,523); Santa Clara, California
12/27/2012*; 6:00 pm	at Canisius; Gotham Classic	L 74–87	2–12	Koessler Athletic Center (1,388); Buffalo, New York
12/29/2012*; 6:00 pm, ESPN3	at No. 9 Syracuse; Gotham Classic	L 36–57	2–13	Carrier Dome (19,365); Syracuse, New York
01/02/2013; 7:30 pm	Prairie View A&M	W 68–54	3–13 (1–0)	Davey Whitney Complex (150); Lorman, Mississippi
01/04/2013; 8:00 pm	Texas Southern	L 48–57	3–14 (1–1)	Davey Whitney Complex (175); Lorman, Mississippi
01/06/2013; 5:30 pm	at Jackson State	W 51–48	4–14 (2–1)	Williams Assembly Center (798); Jackson, Mississippi
01/08/2013; 7:30 pm	at Grambling State	W 80–46	5–14 (3–1)	Fredrick C. Hobdy Assembly Center (832); Grambling, Louisiana
01/12/2013; 5:00 pm	Mississippi Valley State	W 72–67	6–14 (4–1)	Davey Whitney Complex (1,100); Lorman, Mississippi
01/14/2013; 7:45 pm	Arkansas–Pine Bluff	L 52–62	6–15 (4–2)	Davey Whitney Complex (500); Lorman, Mississippi
01/19/2013; 5:30 pm	at Alabama A&M	W 69–59	7–15 (5–2)	Elmore Gymnasium (951); Normal, Alabama
01/21/2013; 5:00 pm	at Alabama State	L 46–49	7–16 (5–3)	Dunn–Oliver Acadome (954); Montgomery, Alabama
01/26/2013; 5:30 pm	Southern	W 61–57	8–16 (6–3)	Davey Whitney Complex (3,000); Lorman, Mississippi
02/02/2013; 5:00 pm	Jackson State	L 71–84	8–17 (6–4)	Davey Whitney Complex (3,100); Lorman, Mississippi
02/04/2013; 7:30 pm	Grambling State	W 78–53	9–17 (7–4)	Davey Whitney Complex (3,500); Lorman, Mississippi
02/09/2013; 5:00 pm	at Mississippi Valley State	L 75–80	9–18 (7–5)	Harrison HPER Complex (4,120); Itta Bena, Mississippi
02/11/2013; 8:00 pm, ESPNU	at Arkansas–Pine Bluff	L 52–80	9–19 (7–6)	K. L. Johnson Complex (4,355); Pine Bluff, Arkansas
02/16/2013; 5:00 pm	Alabama A&M	L 65–72	9–20 (7–7)	Davey Whitney Complex (700); Lorman, Mississippi
02/18/2013; 8:15 pm	Alabama State	L 58–66	9–21 (7–8)	Davey Whitney Complex (700); Lorman, Mississippi
02/23/2013; 4:00 pm	at Southern	L 48–61	9–22 (7–9)	F. G. Clark Center (3,442); Baton Rouge, Louisiana
02/28/2013; 7:30 pm	at Prairie View A&M	W 81–75	10–22 (8–9)	William Nicks Building (1,312); Prairie View, Texas
03/02/2013; 8:00 pm	at Texas Southern	L 59–78	10–23 (8–10)	Health and Physical Education Arena (1,845); Houston, Texas
2013 SWAC Basketball tournament
03/14/2013; 8:00 pm	vs. Prairie View A&M; Quarterfinals	L 59–67	10–24	Curtis Culwell Center (605); Garland, Texas
*Non-conference game. ^{#}Rankings from AP Poll. (#) Tournament seedings in parentheses. All times are in Central Time.
