= 2012–13 Southern Jaguars basketball team =

American college basketball season

2012–13 Southern Jaguars men's basketball
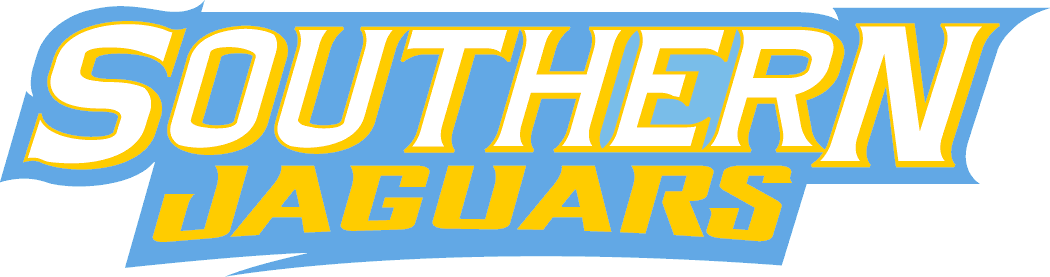

SWAC tournament champions

NCAA tournament, round of 64
- Conference: Southwestern Athletic Conference
- Record: 23–10 (15–3 SWAC)
- Head coach: Roman Banks (2nd season)
- Assistant coaches: Rodney Kirschner; Morris Scott; Ryan Price; Sheldon Jones
- Home arena: F. G. Clark Center

2012–13 SWAC men's basketball standings
	Conf.				Overall
Team	W		L	PCT	W		L	PCT
Texas Southern**	16	–	2	.889	17	–	14	.548
Southern †	15	–	3	.833	23	–	10	.697
Arkansas–Pine Bluff*	15	–	3	.833	16	–	14	.533
Jackson State	9	–	9	.500	11	–	18	.379
Prairie View A&M	8	–	10	.444	15	–	19	.441
Alabama State	8	–	10	.444	10	–	22	.313
Alcorn State	8	–	10	.444	10	–	24	.294
Alabama A&M	6	–	12	.333	11	–	20	.355
Mississippi Valley State*	5	–	13	.278	5	–	23	.179
Grambling State	0	–	18	.000	0	–	28	.000
† 2013 SWAC tournament winner As of March 21, 2013; *Ineligible for postseason play due to APR penalties **Ineligible for postseason play due to NCAA sanctions Rankings from AP Poll

The 2012–13 Southern Jaguars basketball team represented Southern University during the 2012–13 NCAA Division I men's basketball season. The Jaguars, led by second year head coach Roman Banks, played their home games at the F. G. Clark Center and were members of the Southwestern Athletic Conference. They finished the season 23–10, 15–3 in SWAC play to finish in a tie for second place. They were champions of the SWAC tournament to earn an automatic bid to the 2013 NCAA tournament where they lost in the second round to Gonzaga.

== Roster ==
Number	Name	Position	Height	Weight	Year	Hometown
2	Derick Beltran	Guard	6–4	190	Senior	Riverview, Florida
5	Jameel Grace	Guard	6–0	185	Senior	Newark, New Jersey
10	Cameron Monroe	Guard	6–2	190	Sophomore	Shreveport, Louisiana
23	Yondarius Johnson	Guard	6–4	180	Junior	Plain Dealing, Louisiana
25	Thomas Marshall	Guard	5–9	175	Sophomore	Atlanta, Georgia
30	Aaron Alston	Forward	6–7	190	Sophomore	Hesperia, California
31	Christopher Hyder	Guard	5–11	170	Freshman	Dallas, Texas
32	Brandon Moore	Center	6–10	215	Senior	New Orleans, Louisiana
33	Malcolm Miller	Guard	6–6	200	Junior	Midland, Texas
35	Madut Bol	Center	6–9	200	Senior	Jersey City, New Jersey
40	Damien Goodwin	Forward	6–8	200	Freshman	Atlanta, Georgia
44	Javan Mitchell	Center	6–9	250	Junior	St. Martinville, Louisiana

== Schedule ==
Date time, TV	Rank^{#}	Opponent^{#}	Result	Record	Site (attendance) city, state
Regular season
11/09/2012*; 7:00 pm		at Iowa State	L 59–82	0–1	Hilton Coliseum (13,975); Ames, Iowa
11/11/2012*; 6:00 pm, BTN		at Nebraska	L 55–66	0–2	Bob Devaney Sports Center (9,214); Lincoln, Nebraska
11/14/2012*; 5:30 pm		vs. South Dakota; Global Sports Showcase	W 83–79	1–2	Arena-Auditorium (253); Laramie, Wyoming
11/15/2012*; 5:30 pm		vs. North Carolina Central; Global Sports Showcase	L 55–59	1–3	Arena-Auditorium (153); Laramie, Wyoming
11/16/2012*; 8:00 pm		at Wyoming; Global Sports Showcase	L 60–67	1–4	Arena-Auditorium (5,019); Laramie, Wyoming
11/24/2012*; 7:00 pm		at Tulane	L 65–68	1–5	Devlin Fieldhouse (1,606); New Orleans
12/01/2012*; 3:00 pm		Champion Baptist	W 90–36	2–5	F. G. Clark Center (518); Baton Rouge, Louisiana
12/10/2012*; 7:00 pm		William Carey	W 77–50	3–5	F. G. Clark Center (199); Baton Rouge, Louisiana
12/13/2012*; 7:00 pm		at Louisiana–Monroe	W 68–39	4–5	Fant–Ewing Coliseum (1,082); Monroe, Louisiana
12/18/2012*; 8:00 pm, FSSW+		at TCU	L 57–68	4–6	Daniel-Meyer Coliseum (3,896); Fort Worth, Texas
12/22/2012*; 3:00 pm		at Texas A&M	W 53–51	5–6	Reed Arena (5,325); College Station, Texas
12/28/2012*; 8:30 pm		Spring Hill	W 67–46	6–6	F. G. Clark Center (389); Baton Rouge, Louisiana
01/02/2013; 8:00 pm		Texas Southern	W 63–57	7–6 (1–0)	F. G. Clark Center (869); Baton Rouge, Louisiana
01/04/2013; 7:30 pm		Prairie View A&M	W 50–45	8–6 (2–0)	F. G. Clark Center (1,668); Baton Rouge, Louisiana
01/06/2013; 7:30 pm		at Grambling State	W 82–43	9–6 (3–0)	Fredrick C. Hobdy Assembly Center (N/A); Grambling, Louisiana
01/08/2013; 7:30 pm		at Jackson State	W 80–67	10–6 (4–0)	Williams Assembly Center (729); Jackson, Mississippi
01/12/2013; 4:25 pm		Arkansas–Pine Bluff	W 84–50	11–6 (5–0)	F. G. Clark Center (1,880); Baton Rouge, Louisiana
01/14/2013; 8:00 pm		Mississippi Valley State	W 88–54	12–6 (6–0)	F. G. Clark Center (1,641); Baton Rouge, Louisiana
01/19/2013; 5:25 pm		at Alabama State	W 79–67	13–6 (7–0)	Dunn–Oliver Acadome (1,224); Montgomery, Alabama
01/21/2013; 8:30 pm, ESPNU		at Alabama A&M	W 82–68	14–6 (8–0)	Elmore Gymnasium (1,284); Normal, Alabama
01/26/2013; 5:30 pm		at Alcorn State	L 57–61	14–7 (8–1)	Davey Whitney Complex (3,000); Lorman, Mississippi
02/02/2013; 5:00 pm		Grambling State	W 59–31	15–7 (9–1)	F. G. Clark Center (4,800); Baton Rouge, Louisiana
02/04/2013; 8:00 pm		Jackson State	W 78–58	16–7 (10–1)	F. G. Clark Center (2,722); Baton Rouge, Louisiana
02/09/2013; 7:30 pm		at Arkansas–Pine Bluff	L 52–55	16–8 (10–2)	K. L. Johnson Complex (3,462); Pine Bluff, Arkansas
02/11/2013; 7:50 pm		at Mississippi Valley State	W 78–74	17–8 (11–2)	Harrison HPER Complex (3,014); Itta Bena, Mississippi
02/16/2013; 4:20 pm		Alabama State	W 58–49	18–8 (12–2)	F. G. Clark Center (1,849); Baton Rouge, Louisiana
02/18/2013; 8:05 pm		Alabama A&M	W 81–67	19–8 (13–2)	F. G. Clark Center (1,576); Baton Rouge, Louisiana
02/23/2013; 4:00 pm		Alcorn State	W 61–48	20–8 (14–2)	F. G. Clark Center (3,442); Baton Rouge, Louisiana
02/28/2013; 8:00 pm		at Texas Southern	L 66–79	20–9 (14–3)	Health and Physical Education Arena (4,108); Houston, Texas
03/02/2013; 5:00 pm		at Prairie View A&M	W 61–39	21–9 (15–3)	William Nicks Building (1,112); Prairie View, Texas
2013 SWAC tournament
03/15/2013; 8:00 pm		vs. Alabama A&M; Semifinals	W 72–59	22–9	Curtis Culwell Center (1,155); Garland, Texas
03/16/2013; 3:30 pm, ESPN2		vs. Prairie View A&M; Championship Game	W 45–44	23–9	Curtis Culwell Center (2,030); Garland, Texas
2013 NCAA tournament
03/21/2013*; 3:45 pm, TBS	(16 W)	vs. (1 W) No. 1 Gonzaga; Second Round	L 58–64	23–10	EnergySolutions Arena (12,621); Salt Lake City
*Non-conference game. ^{#}Rankings from AP Poll. (#) Tournament seedings in parentheses. W=West region. All times are in Central Time.
