= 2012–13 Texas Southern Tigers basketball team =

American college basketball season

2012–13 Texas Southern Tigers men's basketball
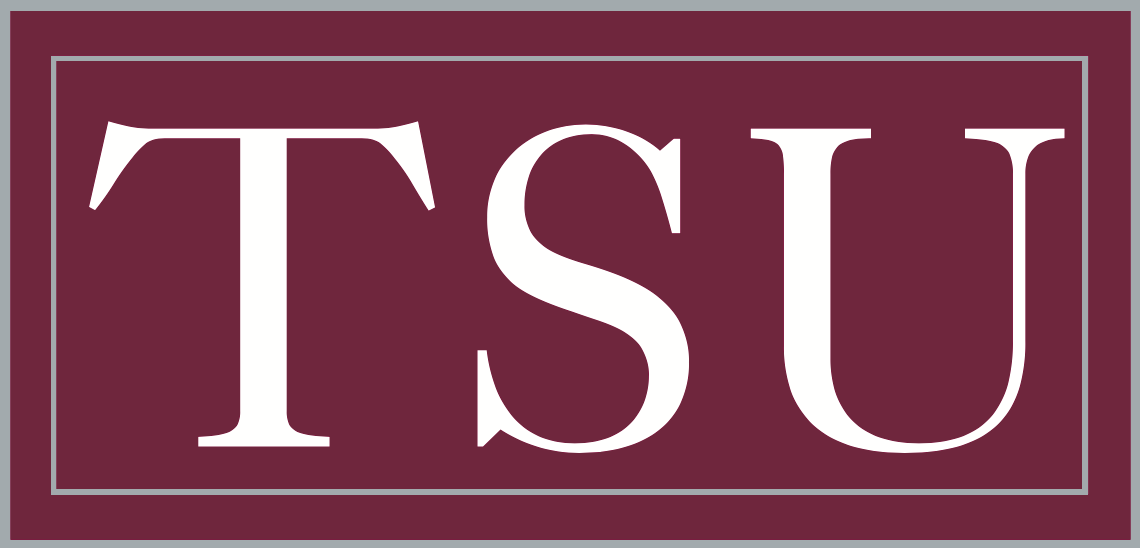

SWAC Regular Season Champions
- Conference: Southwestern Athletic Conference
- Record: 17–14 (16–2 SWAC)
- Head coach: Mike Davis (1st season)
- Assistant coaches: Donald Marsh; Walter Pitts; J. Keith LeGree
- Home arena: Health and Physical Education Arena

2012–13 SWAC men's basketball standings
	Conf.				Overall
Team	W		L	PCT	W		L	PCT
Texas Southern**	16	–	2	.889	17	–	14	.548
Southern †	15	–	3	.833	23	–	10	.697
Arkansas–Pine Bluff*	15	–	3	.833	16	–	14	.533
Jackson State	9	–	9	.500	11	–	18	.379
Prairie View A&M	8	–	10	.444	15	–	19	.441
Alabama State	8	–	10	.444	10	–	22	.313
Alcorn State	8	–	10	.444	10	–	24	.294
Alabama A&M	6	–	12	.333	11	–	20	.355
Mississippi Valley State*	5	–	13	.278	5	–	23	.179
Grambling State	0	–	18	.000	0	–	28	.000
† 2013 SWAC tournament winner As of March 21, 2013; *Ineligible for postseason play due to APR penalties **Ineligible for postseason play due to NCAA sanctions Rankings from AP Poll

The 2012–13 Texas Southern Tigers basketball team represented Texas Southern University during the 2012–13 NCAA Division I men's basketball season. The Tigers, led by first year head coach Mike Davis, played their home games at the Health and Physical Education Arena and were members of the Southwestern Athletic Conference. Texas Southern is serving a two-year postseason ban for men's basketball, after the NCAA Division I Infractions Committee said it found a lack of institutional control and outlined problems spanning 13 sports over a seven-year period, including booster-related recruiting violations, academic improprieties, the use of ineligible athletes and exceeding scholarship limits. The Tigers finished the season 17–14, 16–2 in SWAC play to claim the SWAC regular season championship. They ended the season on a 12-game winning streak. Due to the post season ban, they could not participate in the 2013 SWAC men's basketball tournament.

== Roster ==
Number	Name	Position	Height	Weight	Year	Hometown
2	Dexter Ellington	Guard	6–1	173	Senior	Cuthbert, Georgia
3	Madarious Gibbs	Guard	6–0	180	Sophomore	Newnan, Georgia
4	Fred Sturdivant	Forward	6–7	185	Senior	Chattanooga, Tennessee
5	Omar Strong	Guard	5–9	176	Senior	Baltimore, Maryland
11	Lawrence Johnson-Danner	Guard	6–4	180	Junior	Detroit, Michigan
12	Kyrie Sutton	Forward	6–9	240	Graduate	Brooklyn, New York
14	Raymond Penn	Guard	5–9	160	Junior	Houston, Texas
15	De Angelo Scott	Forward	6–7	215	Senior	Los Angeles, California
20	Nick Barnes	Guard	6–5	170	Freshman	Valley, Alabama
23	Stephen Bedford	Guard	5–9	175	Freshman	Houston, Texas
32	Aaron Clayborn	Forward	6–6	215	Junior	Benton Harbor, Michigan
33	Ethan Blackwell	Guard	5–7	135	Freshman	Detroit, Michigan

== Schedule ==
Date time, TV	Opponent	Result	Record	Site (attendance) city, state
Regular Season
November 11, 2012*; 3:00 pm	at Boise State	L 63–81	0–1	Taco Bell Arena (1,950); Boise, ID
November 13, 2012*; 7:00 pm, BTN	at Northwestern	L 49–79	0–2	Welsh-Ryan Arena (5,043); Evanston, IL
November 16, 2012*; 7:00 pm	Louisiana–Lafayette	W 74–71 ^{OT}	1–2	Health and Physical Education Arena (1,204); Houston, TX
November 18, 2012*; 11:00 am	at No. 21 Michigan State	L 41–69	1–3	Breslin Student Events Center (14,797); East Lansing, MI
November 20, 2012*; 7:00 pm	Oakland	L 69–71	1–4	Health and Physical Education Arena (1,114); Houston, TX
November 24, 2012*; 6:00 pm	at Middle Tennessee	L 52–79	1–5	Murphy Center (5,411); Murfreesboro, TN
November 27, 2012*; 8:00 pm, P12N	at No. 19 Colorado	L 80–85 ^{2OT}	1–6	Coors Events Center (8,325); Boulder, CO
December 3, 2012*; 9:00 pm, TWCSN	at No. 17 San Diego State	L 62–74	1–7	Viejas Arena (12,414); San Diego, CA
December 8, 2012*; 5:00 pm	at Houston	L 75–78 ^{OT}	1–8	Hofheinz Pavilion (3,513); Houston, TX
December 16, 2012*; 2:00 pm	Cal State Fullerton	L 86–93	1–9	Health and Physical Education Arena (369); Houston, TX
December 18, 2012*; 7:00 pm, FSKC	at Kansas State	L 69–78	1–10	Bramlage Coliseum (12,005); Manhattan, KS
December 22, 2012*; 1:00 pm	FIU	L 45–48	1–11	Health and Physical Education Arena (315); Houston, TX
December 27, 2012*; 6:00 pm	at Akron	L 68–83	1–12	James A. Rhodes Arena (2,503); Akron, OH
January 2, 2013; 8:00 pm	at Southern	L 57–63	1–13 (0–1)	F. G. Clark Center (869); Baton Rouge, LA
January 4, 2013; 8:00 pm	at Alcorn State	W 57–48	2–13 (1–1)	Davey Whitney Complex (175); Lorman, MS
January 6, 2013; 7:00 pm	at Prairie View A&M	W 65–60	3–13 (2–1)	William Nicks Building (2,877); Prairie View, TX
January 12, 2013; 8:00 pm	Jackson State	W 84–57	4–13 (3–1)	Health and Physical Education Arena (916); Houston, TX
January 14, 2013; 8:00 pm	Grambling State	W 95–50	5–13 (4–1)	Health and Physical Education Arena (1,836); Houston, TX
January 19, 2013; 7:30 pm	at Arkansas–Pine Bluff	L 63–66	5–14 (4–2)	K. L. Johnson Complex (3,674); Pine Bluff, AR
January 21, 2013; 7:30 pm	at Mississippi Valley State	W 75–48	6–14 (5–2)	Harrison HPER Complex (2,019); Itta Bena, MS
January 26, 2013; 8:00 pm	Alabama A&M	W 89–56	7–14 (6–2)	Health and Physical Education Arena (652); Houston, TX
January 28, 2013; 6:00 pm, ESPNU	Alabama State	W 97–65	8–14 (7–2)	Health and Physical Education Arena (2,287); Houston, TX
February 2, 2013; 8:00 pm	Prairie View A&M	W 84–48	9–14 (8–2)	Health and Physical Education Arena (8,024); Houston, TX
February 9, 2013; 5:30 pm	at Jackson State	W 61–54	10–14 (9–2)	Williams Assembly Center (401); Jackson, MS
February 11, 2013; 7:30 pm	at Grambling State	W 80–52	11–14 (10–2)	Fredrick C. Hobdy Assembly Center (1,356); Grambling, LA
February 16, 2013; 1:30 pm	Arkansas–Pine Bluff	W 75–69	12–14 (11–2)	Health and Physical Education Arena (1,824); Houston, TX
February 18, 2013; 8:00 pm	Mississippi Valley State	W 73–57	13–14 (12–2)	Health and Physical Education Arena (650); Houston, TX
February 23, 2013; 6:00 pm	at Alabama A&M	W 64–62	14–14 (13–2)	Elmore Gymnasium (967); Normal, AL
February 25, 2013; 7:50 pm	at Alabama State	W 70–50	15–14 (14–2)	Dunn–Oliver Acadome (876); Montgomery, AL
February 28, 2013; 8:00 pm	Southern	W 79–66	16–14 (15–2)	Health and Physical Education Arena (4,108); Houston, TX
March 2, 2013; 8:00 pm	Alcorn State	W 78–59	17–14 (16–2)	Health and Physical Education Arena (1,845); Houston, TX
*Non-conference game. ^{#}Rankings from AP Poll. (#) Tournament seedings in parentheses. All times are in Central Time.
