= 2009–10 Arkansas–Pine Bluff Golden Lions men's basketball team =

American college basketball season

2009–10 Arkansas–Pine Bluff Golden Lions men's basketball

SWAC tournament champions

NCAA tournament, Round of 64
- Conference: Southwestern Athletic Conference
- Record: 18–16 (14–4 SWAC)
- Head coach: George Ivory (2nd season)
- Assistant coaches: Kenneth Broyles; Richard Cannon; Cary Shelton
- Home arena: K. L. Johnson Complex

2009–10 SWAC men's basketball standings
	Conf.				Overall
Team	W		L	PCT	W		L	PCT
Jackson State	17	–	1	.944	19	–	12	.613
Arkansas–Pine Bluff†	16	–	4	.800	17	–	15	.531
Alabama State	12	–	7	.632	15	–	15	.500
Prairie View A&M	11	–	7	.611	16	–	13	.552
Texas Southern	12	–	8	.600	16	–	16	.500
Alabama A&M	8	–	10	.444	11	–	15	.423
Mississippi Valley State	8	–	10	.444	9	–	23	.281
Grambling State	4	–	15	.211	7	–	21	.250
Southern	3	–	15	.167	5	–	25	.167
Alcorn State	2	–	16	.111	2	–	29	.065
† 2010 SWAC tournament winner As of March 13, 2010; Rankings from AP Poll

The 2009–10 Arkansas–Pine Bluff Golden Lions men's basketball team represented the University of Arkansas at Pine Bluff in the 2009–10 NCAA Division I men's basketball season. The Golden Lions, led by 2nd-year head coach George Ivory, played their home games at the K. L. Johnson Complex in Pine Bluff, Arkansas as members of the Southwestern Athletic Conference. Despite not playing a home game until the 15th game of the season, and starting the season with 11 consecutive losses, Arkansas–Pine Bluff finished second in the SWAC regular season standings. The Golden Lions then won the SWAC tournament to earn an automatic bid to the NCAA tournament. After defeating Winthrop in the play-in game, the Golden Lions advanced as the No. 16 seed in the South region where they lost to No. 1 seed and eventual National champion Duke, 73–44.

== Roster ==
2009–10 Arkansas–Pine Bluff Golden Lions men's basketball team
Players
Coaches

Pos.	#	Name	Height	Weight	Year	Hometown
G	14	Terrance Calvin	6 ft 2 in (1.88 m)	170 lb (77 kg)	Sr	Clarksdale, Mississippi
G	21	Tavaris Washington	6 ft 5 in (1.96 m)	215 lb (98 kg)	Sr	Pensacola, Florida
G	23	Savalance Townsend	6 ft 3 in (1.91 m)	190 lb (86 kg)	So	Long Beach, Mississippi
F	35	Lebaron Weathers	6 ft 8 in (2.03 m)	245 lb (111 kg)	Sr	Hattiesburg, Mississippi
F	44	Tyree Glass	6 ft 7 in (2.01 m)	220 lb (100 kg)	Sr	Fort Wayne, Indiana

Head coach

- George Ivory (Mississippi Valley State)

Assistant coach(es)

- Kenneth Broyles (Arkansas–Pine Bluff)
- Richard Cannon (Mississippi Valley State)
- Cary Shelton (Arkansas State)

Legend

- (C) Team captain
- (S) Suspended
- (I) Ineligible
- (W) Walk-on
- Injured
- Current redshirt

Roster
Last update: August 23, 2021

== Schedule and results ==
Date time, TV	Rank^{#}	Opponent^{#}	Result	Record	Site (attendance) city, state
Non-conference regular season
Nov 13, 2009*		at Colorado	L 72–88	0–1	Coors Events/Conference Center; Boulder, Colorado
Nov 15, 2009*		at Denver	L 56–75	0–2	Magness Arena; Denver, Colorado
Nov 18, 2009*		at UTEP	L 52–70	0–3	Don Haskins Center; El Paso, Texas
Nov 27, 2009*		at Akron	L 65–68	0–4	James A. Rhodes Arena; Akron, Ohio
Nov 30, 2009*		at Arizona State	L 57–74	0–5	Wells Fargo Arena; Tempe, Arizona
Dec 5, 2009*		at Michigan	L 53–67	0–6	Crisler Arena; Ann Arbor, Michigan
Dec 13, 2009*		at Oklahoma State	L 66–81	0–7	Gallagher-Iba Arena; Stillwater, Oklahoma
Dec 16, 2009*		at No. 22 Georgia Tech	L 53–65	0–8	Alexander Memorial Coliseum; Atlanta, Georgia
Dec 19, 2009*		at Missouri	L 70–88	0–9	Mizzou Arena; Columbia, Missouri
Dec 21, 2009*		at No. 12 Kansas State	L 76–90	0–10	Bramlage Coliseum; Manhattan, Kansas
Dec 28, 2009*		at Oregon	L 53–73	0–11	McArthur Court; Eugene, Oregon
SWAC regular season
Jan 4, 2010		at Mississippi Valley State	W 69–68 ^{OT}	1–11 (1–0)	Harrison HPER Complex; Itta Bena, Mississippi
Jan 9, 2010		at Alabama A&M	W 82–72	2–11 (2–0)	Elmore Gymnasium; Huntsville, Alabama
Jan 11, 2010		at Alabama State	L 73–75 ^{OT}	2–12 (2–1)	ASU Acadome; Montgomery, Alabama
Jan 16, 2010		Southern	W 64–51	3–12 (3–1)	K. L. Johnson Complex; Pine Bluff, Arkansas
Jan 18, 2010		Alcorn State	W 93–59	4–12 (4–1)	K. L. Johnson Complex; Pine Bluff, Arkansas
Jan 23, 2010		at Prairie View A&M	W 62–54	5–12 (5–1)	William J. Nicks Building; Prairie View, Texas
Jan 25, 2010		at Texas Southern	L 67–70	5–13 (5–2)	Health and Physical Education Arena; Houston, Texas
Jan 30, 2010		Grambling State	W 92–69	6–13 (6–2)	K. L. Johnson Complex; Pine Bluff, Arkansas
Feb 1, 2010		Jackson State	L 67–72	6–14 (6–3)	K. L. Johnson Complex; Pine Bluff, Arkansas
Feb 6, 2010		Alabama A&M	W 62–55	7–14 (7–3)	K. L. Johnson Complex; Pine Bluff, Arkansas
Feb 8, 2010		Alabama State	W 47–42	8–14 (8–3)	K. L. Johnson Complex; Pine Bluff, Arkansas
Feb 13, 2010		at Southern	W 66–62	9–14 (9–3)	F. G. Clark Center; Baton Rouge, Louisiana
Feb 15, 2010		at Alcorn State	W 59–45	10–14 (10–3)	Davey Whitney Complex; Lorman, Mississippi
Feb 20, 2010		Prairie View A&M	W 57–55 ^{OT}	11–14 (11–3)	K. L. Johnson Complex; Pine Bluff, Arkansas
Feb 22, 2010		Texas Southern	W 57–53 ^{OT}	12–14 (12–3)	K. L. Johnson Complex; Pine Bluff, Arkansas
Feb 27, 2010		at Grambling State	W 68–56	13–14 (13–3)	HPER Complex; Grambling, Louisiana
Mar 1, 2010		at Jackson State	L 54–57	13–15 (13–4)	Williams Assembly Center; Jackson, Mississippi
Mar 4, 2010		Mississippi Valley State	W 84–68	14–15 (14–4)	K. L. Johnson Complex; Pine Bluff, Arkansas
SWAC tournament
Mar 10, 2010	(2)	vs. (7) Mississippi Valley State; SWAC Quarterfinals	W 69–66	15–15	CenturyTel Center; Bossier City, Louisiana
Mar 12, 2010	(2)	vs. (3) Alabama State; SWAC Semifinals	W 46–44	16–15	CenturyTel Center; Bossier City, Louisiana
Mar 13, 2010	(2)	vs. (5) Texas Southern; SWAC Championship Game	W 50–38	17–15	CenturyTel Center; Bossier City, Louisiana
NCAA tournament
Mar 16, 2010*; ESPN	(16 S)	vs. (16 S) Winthrop; NCAA Opening Round	W 61–44	18–15	University of Dayton Arena (8,205); Dayton, Ohio
Mar 19, 2010*	(16 S)	vs. (1 S) No. 3 Duke; NCAA First Round	L 44–73	18–16	Jacksonville Veterans Memorial Arena (12,251); Jacksonville, Florida
*Non-conference game. ^{#}Rankings from AP poll. (#) Tournament seedings in parentheses. S=NCAA South Regional. All times are in Central Time. Sources
