= 2012–13 Alabama A&M Bulldogs basketball team =

American college basketball season

2012–13 Alabama A&M Bulldogs men's basketball
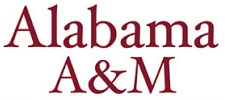
- Conference: Southwestern Athletic Conference
- Record: 11–20 (6–12 SWAC)
- Head coach: Willie Hayes
- Assistant coaches: Dexter Holt; James Wright; Orlando Essex
- Home arena: Elmore Gymnasium

2012–13 SWAC men's basketball standings
	Conf.				Overall
Team	W		L	PCT	W		L	PCT
Texas Southern**	16	–	2	.889	17	–	14	.548
Southern †	15	–	3	.833	23	–	10	.697
Arkansas–Pine Bluff*	15	–	3	.833	16	–	14	.533
Jackson State	9	–	9	.500	11	–	18	.379
Prairie View A&M	8	–	10	.444	15	–	19	.441
Alabama State	8	–	10	.444	10	–	22	.313
Alcorn State	8	–	10	.444	10	–	24	.294
Alabama A&M	6	–	12	.333	11	–	20	.355
Mississippi Valley State*	5	–	13	.278	5	–	23	.179
Grambling State	0	–	18	.000	0	–	28	.000
† 2013 SWAC tournament winner As of March 21, 2013; *Ineligible for postseason play due to APR penalties **Ineligible for postseason play due to NCAA sanctions Rankings from AP Poll

The 2012–13 Alabama A&M Bulldogs basketball team represented Alabama Agricultural and Mechanical University during the 2012–13 NCAA Division I men's basketball season. The Bulldogs, led by head coach Willie Hayes, played their home games at Elmore Gymnasium and were members of the Southwestern Athletic Conference. They finished the season 11–20, 6–12 in SWAC play to finish in eighth place. They advanced to the semifinals of the SWAC tournament where they lost to Southern.

== Roster ==
Number	Name	Position	Height	Weight	Year	Hometown
0	Justan Banks	Center	7–1	215	Junior	Oxford, Alabama
4	Justin Colvin	Guard	6–3	190	Freshman	Lithonia, Georgia
10	Jeremy Crutcher	Guard	5–8	160	Junior	Hazel Green, Alabama
11	Arthur Capers	Forward	6–5	185	Junior	Monroe, Georgia
12	Green Hill	Guard	5–10	175	Junior	Aransas Pass, Texas
20	Jose Long	Guard/Forward	6–5	210	Junior	Madison, Alabama
22	Tyler Davis	Guard	6–2	180	Freshman	Madison, Alabama
30	Demarquelle Tabb	Guard/Forward	6–5	210	Junior	Greensboro, Alabama
33	Baryn Houston	Guard/Forward	6–7	190	Freshman	Birmingham, Alabama
34	David Basil	Forward/Center	6–6	215	Freshman	Savannah, Georgia
35	Nicholas West	Forward	6–10	190	Freshman	LaGrange, Georgia
40	Brandon Ellis	Guard	6–3	200	Junior	Loxley, Alabama
45	Justin Wagner	Guard/Forward	6–4	190	Senior	Greensboro, Alabama
52	Anthony Lanier	Forward/Center	6–6	260	Sophomore	Savannah, Georgia
55	Jerome Hunter	Forward/Center	6–8	230	Junior	Buffalo, New York
	Matthew Cotton	Guard	5–10	185	Freshman	Atlanta

== Schedule ==
Date time, TV	Opponent	Result	Record	Site (attendance) city, state
Regular season
11/09/2012*; 7:00 pm	Miles	W 67–48	1–0	Elmore Gymnasium (1,267); Huntsville, Alabama
11/12/2012*; 7:00 pm	at Iowa State	L 40–98	1–1	Hilton Coliseum (12,615); Ames, Iowa
11/15/2012*; 7:00 pm	at Jacksonville State	L 61–79	1–2	Pete Mathews Coliseum (1,985); Jacksonville, Alabama
11/20/2012*; 7:30 pm	Oakwood	W 103–77	2–2	Elmore Gymnasium (923); Huntsville, Alabama
11/26/2012*; 7:05 pm	at Evansville	L 46–72	2–3	Ford Center (3,510); Evansville, Indiana
12/01/2012*; 7:00 pm	Tennessee State	L 72–83	2–4	Elmore Gymnasium (1,059); Huntsville, Alabama
12/08/2012*; 6:00 pm	at Mercer	L 46–65	2–5	Hawkins Arena (2,261); Macon, Georgia
12/15/2012*; 7:00 pm	at Vanderbilt	L 46–71	2–6	Memorial Gymnasium (9,880); Nashville, Tennessee
12/18/2012*; 7:00 pm, ESPN3	Missouri State	W 59–47	3–6	Elmore Gymnasium (290); Huntsville, Alabama
12/22/2012*; 7:00 pm	vs. Arkansas	L 68–95	3–7	Verizon Arena (9,274); North Little Rock, Arkansas
12/30/2012*; 3:00 pm, ESPN3	at Mississippi State	W 59–57	4–7	Humphrey Coliseum (7,526); Starkville, Mississippi
01/02/2013; 7:45 pm	Grambling State	W 78–53	5–7 (1–0)	Elmore Gymnasium (489); Huntsville, Alabama
01/04/2013; 8:00 pm	Jackson State	W 88–87 ^{2OT}	6–7 (2–0)	Elmore Gymnasium; Huntsville, Alabama
01/06/2013; 7:30 pm	at Mississippi Valley State	L 68–79	6–8 (2–1)	Harrison HPER Complex (1,076); Itta Bena, Mississippi
01/08/2013; 7:30 pm	at Arkansas–Pine Bluff	L 61–77	6–9 (2–2)	K. L. Johnson Complex (3,989); Pine Bluff, Arkansas
01/12/2013; 6:00 pm	Alabama State	W 64–57	7–9 (3–2)	Elmore Gymnasium (3,449); Huntsville, Alabama
01/19/2013; 5:30 pm	Alcorn State	L 59–69	7–10 (3–3)	Elmore Gymnasium (951); Huntsville, Alabama
01/21/2013; 8:30 pm, ESPNU	Southern Jaguars	L 68–82	7–11 (3–4)	Elmore Gymnasium (1,284); Huntsville, Alabama
01/26/2013; 8:00 pm	at Texas Southern	L 56–89	7–12 (3–5)	Health and Physical Education Arena (652); Houston, Texas
01/28/2013; 7:30 pm	at Prairie View A&M	L 46–65	7–13 (3–6)	William Nicks Building (1,765); Prairie View, Texas
02/02/2013; 5:30 pm	Mississippi Valley State	W 65–64	8–13 (4–6)	Elmore Gymnasium (728); Huntsville, Alabama
02/04/2013; 8:00 pm	Arkansas-Pine Bluff	L 67–76	8–14 (4–7)	Elmore Gymnasium (808); Huntsville, Alabama
02/09/2013; 5:30 pm	at Alabama State	L 62–69	8–15 (4–8)	Dunn–Oliver Acadome (5,354); Montgomery, Alabama
02/16/2013; 5:00 pm	at Alcorn State	W 72–65	9–15 (5–8)	Davey Whitney Complex (700); Lorman, Mississippi
02/18/2013; 8:05 pm	at Southern	L 67–81	9–16 (5–9)	F. G. Clark Center (1,576); Baton Rouge, Louisiana
02/23/2013; 6:00 pm	Texas Southern	L 62–64	9–17 (5–10)	Elmore Gymnasium (967); Huntsville, Alabama
02/25/2013; 7:30 pm	Prairie View A&M	L 57–61 ^{OT}	9–18 (5–11)	Elmore Gymnasium (912); Huntsville, Alabama
02/28/2013; 7:30 pm	at Grambling State	W 74–47	10–18 (6–11)	Fredrick C. Hobdy Assembly Center (N/A); Grambling, Louisiana
03/02/2013; 5:30 pm	at Jackson State	L 57–60	10–19 (6–12)	Williams Assembly Center (797); Jackson, Mississippi
2013 SWAC Basketball tournament
03/13/2013; 8:00 pm	vs. Grambling State; Quarterfinals	W 59–51	11–19	Curtis Culwell Center (425); Garland, Texas
03/15/2013; 8:00 pm	vs. Southern; Semifinals	L 59–72	11–20	Curtis Culwell Center (1,155); Garland, Texas
*Non-conference game. ^{#}Rankings from AP Poll. (#) Tournament seedings in parentheses. All times are in Central Time.
