= George Ivory (basketball) =

American basketball player and coach (born 1965)

Biographical details
- Born: August 7, 1965 (age 61); Jackson, Mississippi, U.S.

Playing career
- 1984–1988: Mississippi Valley State

Coaching career (HC unless noted)
- 1991–1998: Jackson State (Women's, asst.)
- 1998–2002: Mississippi Valley State (asst.)
- 2002–2006: Arkansas–Pine Bluff (asst.)
- 2006–2007: Grambling State (asst.)
- 2007–2008: Mississippi Valley State (asst.)
- 2008–2021: Arkansas–Pine Bluff
- 2021–2022: Mississippi Valley State (asst./interim HC)
- 2022–2026: Mississippi Valley State
- 2026–present: Friendship Aspire Southeast

Administrative career (AD unless noted)
- 2024–2025: Mississippi Valley State (Interim AD)

Head coaching record
- Overall: 152–387 (.282)
- Tournaments: 1–1 (NCAA Tournament)

Accomplishments and honors

Championships
- SWAC tournament (2010)

Awards
- SWAC Player of the Year (1987)

George Ivory (born August 7, 1965) is an American college basketball coach who is currently the head coach at Friendship Aspire Southeast. Previously, he was the head men's basketball coach at Mississippi Valley State University from 2022 to 2026 and the University of Arkansas-Pine Bluff from 2008 to 2021. Ivory was also an assistant at Mississippi Valley State, his alma mater, from 1998–2002, 2007–2008, and 2021–2022.

== Playing career ==
Ivory grew up in Jackson, Mississippi, where he attended Murrah High School, one of the top basketball schools in the country. He played at Murrah for three years, winning numerous awards prior to graduating in 1983.

After Ivory finished at Murrah High School, he went on to attend college at Mississippi Valley State University. Ivory started all four years at Mississippi Valley State University, winning Southwestern Athletic Conference Men's Basketball Player of the Year honours in 1987. Ivory led the Southwestern Conference with 21.8 points per game.

Upon graduating from Mississippi Valley State University in 1988 with a bachelor's degree, and after trying out professionally with the Chicago Bulls, Harlem Globetrotters, and Illinois Express, Ivory was drafted by the Wyoming Wildcatters of the CBA.

== Coaching career ==
Ivory later went back to college at Jackson State University to receive his master's degree in 1996 while working as a graduate assistant with the Lady Tigers for three years before becoming a full-time assistant in 1991–1998 under head coach Andrew Pennington.

JSU won two tournament championships, a regular-season championship, and made one NCAA appearance. In the fall of 1998, Ivory accepted a similar position with Mississippi Valley State University as men's assistant coach under then-head coach Lafayette Stribling, where they had several outstanding recruiting classes as well as several outstanding teams which competed for SWAC titles for consecutive years.

Ivory subsequently crossed the state line to become an assistant coach at UAPB in the fall of 2002 under then-head coach Van Holt. Holt and staff led the Golden Lions to the finals of the SWAC Tournament in 2005–06.

In 2006–07, Ivory crossed another state line as he was hired as an assistant coach at Grambling State University under then-head coach Larry Wright. In 2007–08 Ivory went back to his alma mater Mississippi Valley State University as an assistant coach under then-head coach James Green, where they went on to win the SWAC Tournament Championship and advanced to the first round of the NCAA Tournament.

=== Arkansas–Pine Bluff ===
In the spring of 2008, Ivory was named the head coach of Arkansas-Pine Bluff. Prior to the start of his first season, the Golden Lions were picked 9th in the SWAC's preseason poll, but UAPB went on to finish in 4th place in the SWAC during their 2008–09 campaign. Arkansas-Pine Bluff also completed conference play with a winning record for the first time in school history.

The 2009–10 basketball season brought about unprecedented success for the University of Arkansas-Pine Bluff men's basketball team. After starting the year 0–11, the Golden Lions finished the season with a remarkable run all the way to the NCAA tournament. The Golden Lions went 18–5 over the course of their last 23 games as they concluded the season with an 18–16 overall record. UAPB won the 2010 SWAC Basketball Tournament Championship, marking the schools’ first title in over four decades (1967). Arkansas-Pine Bluff followed their undefeated SWAC tourney run with a victory over the Winthrop Eagles in the NCAA Opening Round game, snapping a 17-year conference losing streak in the NCAA tournament.

The Golden Lions eventually faced the NCAA National Champion Duke University basketball team in the first round of the tournament. Arkansas-Pine Bluff was the only Division I institution from the state of Arkansas to qualify for the NCAA tournament. For his teams outstanding accomplishments on the court Ivory was named the 2010 HSRN National Coach of the Year, becoming the first coach from Arkansas-Pine Bluff to be awarded such honors. On April 6, 2021, Ivory resigned from UAPB after 13 seasons at the helm.

=== Mississippi Valley State ===
On March 14, 2022, Ivory was named the 12th head coach at his alma mater, Mississippi Valley State, replacing Lindsey Hunter. In July 2024, Ivory was named Interim Athletic Director. He was fired on March 31, 2026 after compiling a 12–118 record.

== Head coaching record ==
Record table
Season	Team	Overall	Conference	Standing	Postseason
Arkansas–Pine Bluff Golden Lions (Southwestern Athletic Conference) (2008–2021)
2008–09	Arkansas–Pine Bluff	13–18	11–7	4th	
2009–10	Arkansas–Pine Bluff	18–16	14–4	2nd	NCAA Division I Round of 64
2010–11	Arkansas–Pine Bluff	7–24	7–11	7th	
2011–12	Arkansas–Pine Bluff	11–22	9–9	5th	
2012–13	Arkansas–Pine Bluff	16–14	15–3	T–2nd	
2013–14	Arkansas–Pine Bluff	13–18	11–7	4th	
2014–15	Arkansas–Pine Bluff	12–20	9–9	T–5th	
2015–16	Arkansas–Pine Bluff	8–25	6–12	T–7th	
2016–17	Arkansas–Pine Bluff	7–25	6–12	T–8th	
2017–18	Arkansas–Pine Bluff	14–21	12–6	T–2nd	
2018–19	Arkansas–Pine Bluff	13–19	10–8	T–3rd	
2019–20	Arkansas–Pine Bluff	4–26	3–15	T–9th	
2020–21	Arkansas–Pine Bluff	4–21	3–12	9th	
Arkansas–Pine Bluff:		140–269 (.342)	116–115 (.502)		
Mississippi Valley State Delta Devils (Southwestern Athletic Conference) (2022–present)
2021–22	Mississippi Valley State	0–3 (Note: Ivory served as interim head coach after the dismissal of Lindsey Hunter.)	0–3	12th	
2022–23	Mississippi Valley State	5–27	4–14	12th	
2023–24	Mississippi Valley State	1–30	1–17	12th	
2024–25	Mississippi Valley State	3–28	1–17	12th	
2025–26	Mississippi Valley State	3–30	2–16	12th	
Mississippi Valley State:		12–118 (.092)	8–67 (.107)		
Total:		152–387 (.282)			
National champion Postseason invitational champion Conference regular season champion Conference regular season and conference tournament champion Division regular season champion Division regular season and conference tournament champion Conference tournament champion
