= Joseph Price (basketball) =

American basketball coach

Dillard Bleu Devils
- Title: Head coach
- League: HBCUAC

Personal information
- Born: Marion, Indiana, U.S.
- Listed height: 6 ft 5 in (1.96 m)
- Listed weight: 200 lb (91 kg)

Career information
- High school: Marion (Marion, Indiana)
- College: Notre Dame (1982–1986)
- NBA draft: 1986: 7th round, 150th overall pick
- Drafted by: Washington Bullets
- Position: Guard
- Coaching career: 2002–present

Career history

Coaching
- 2002–2007: IUPUI (assistant)
- 2007–2010: Ball State (assistant)
- 2010–2011: Morehead State (assistant)
- 2011–2012: Lamar (assistant)
- 2012–2014: Grambling State
- 2014–2022: Central State
- 2022–present: Dillard
- Stats at Basketball Reference

Joseph Price is a college basketball coach at Dillard University. Prior to his arrival at Dillard, he served as the head coach of Central State and Grambling State.

== Playing career ==
Price played college basketball for Notre Dame under Digger Phelps in the 1980s. He later played professionally overseas for 13 years.

== Coaching career ==
=== IUPUI ===
Price began his college coaching career at IUPUI in 2002–03, that same year, the Jaguars advance to the NCAA Tournament for the first time ever. While at IUPUI, Price coached current Indiana Pacers point guard George Hill, a first round selection in the 2008 NBA Draft.

=== Lamar ===
In the 2011–2012 season, Price helped coach the Cardinals to an outstanding 23–12 record and a spot in the NCAA Tournament for the first time since 2000. It was the team's first 20-win season since 1988 and their third highest win total ever.

=== Grambling State ===
In 2012, Price was hired as the head coach of Grambling State. His first season was not successful, as the 2012-13 team went 0–28, becoming just the eighth Division I team in NCAA history to finish a season winless.

=== Central State ===
Price was hired to lead the Marauders of Central State in the summer of 2014. In his first season at CSU, the team contended for the Great Midwest Athletic Conference championship and finished with an 18–12 overall mark. The 18 wins was the most by any first year Central State coach in over 60 years.

== Head coaching record ==
Record table
Season	Team	Overall	Conference	Standing	Postseason
Grambling State (Southwestern Athletic Conference) (2012–2014)
2012–13	Grambling State	0–28	0–18	10th	
2013–14	Grambling State	5–24	3–15	10th	
Grambling State:		5–52 (.088)	3–33 (.083)		
Central State (Great Midwest Athletic Conference) (2014–2015)
2014–15	Central State	18–12	9–5	T–2nd	
Central State (Southern Intercollegiate Athletic Conference) (2015–2022)
2015–16	Central State	11–15	9–9		
2016–17	Central State	11–18	7–10	7th (West)	
2017–18	Central State	14–15	11–8	T–1st (West)	
2018–19	Central State	6–23	4–15	7th (West)	
2019–20	Central State	16–11	11–7	3rd (West)	
2020–21	Central State	0–0	0–0		
2021–22	Central State	6–19	3–15	7th (West)	
Central State:		82–113 (.421)	54–69 (.439)		
Dillard (HBCU Athletic Conference) (2022–present)
2022–23	Dillard	17–8	9–5	3rd	
2023–24	Dillard	14–16	7–11	8th	
2024–25	Dillard	19–12	12–5	2nd	
Dillard:		50–36 (.581)	28–21 (.571)		
Total:		137–201 (.405)			
