= 2013 SWAC men's basketball tournament =

- Tournament logo
- Classification: Division I
- Season: 2012–13
- Teams: 7
- Site: Curtis Culwell Center; Garland, Texas
- Champions: Southern (8th title)
- Television: ESPN2 (final)

2012–13 SWAC men's basketball standings
	Conf.				Overall
Team	W		L	PCT	W		L	PCT
Texas Southern**	16	–	2	.889	17	–	14	.548
Southern †	15	–	3	.833	23	–	10	.697
Arkansas–Pine Bluff*	15	–	3	.833	16	–	14	.533
Jackson State	9	–	9	.500	11	–	18	.379
Prairie View A&M	8	–	10	.444	15	–	19	.441
Alabama State	8	–	10	.444	10	–	22	.313
Alcorn State	8	–	10	.444	10	–	24	.294
Alabama A&M	6	–	12	.333	11	–	20	.355
Mississippi Valley State*	5	–	13	.278	5	–	23	.179
Grambling State	0	–	18	.000	0	–	28	.000
† 2013 SWAC tournament winner As of March 21, 2013; *Ineligible for postseason play due to APR penalties **Ineligible for postseason play due to NCAA sanctions Rankings from AP Poll

The 2013 SWAC men's basketball tournament took place March 12–16, 2013 at the Curtis Culwell Center in Garland, Texas. The tournament champion, Southern University, received the Southwestern Athletic Conference's automatic bid to the 2013 NCAA Men's Division I Basketball Championship.

== Format ==
Seven teams participated in the 2013 tournament. Arkansas-Pine Bluff and Mississippi Valley State each received one-year postseason bans in men's basketball, and thus were not allowed to participate in the 2013 SWAC Tournament, due to failing to meet the NCAA's APR requirements. Texas Southern was serving a two-year postseason ban, after the NCAA Division I Infractions Committee said it found a lack of institutional control and outlined problems spanning 13 sports over a seven-year period.

== Bracket ==
Quarterfinals, March 13/14
6	Alabama A&M	59
7	Grambling State	51
3	Alcorn State	59
4	Prairie View A&M	67
2	Jackson State	66
5	Alabama State	59

Semifinals, Friday, March 15
1	Southern	72
6	Alabama A&M	59
4	Prairie View A&M	88
2	Jackson State	75

Championship, Saturday, March 16; ESPN2
1	Southern	45
4	Prairie View A&M	44

All times listed are Central
