= Chicago Invitational Challenge =

American college basketball tournament

- Sport: College basketball
- Founded: 2006; 20 years ago
- Folded: 2011; 15 years ago
- No. of teams: 8
- Country: United States
- Venues: Sears Centre Arena; Hoffman Estates, Illinois
- Last champion: Wisconsin Badgers (2011)

The Chicago Invitational Challenge was an annual early-season NCAA Division I college basketball tournament held around Thanksgiving week. The first offering was during the 2006–07 season with the last occurring during the 2011–12 season.

For the format of the tournament, the first two games were hosted at on-campus venues, with the semifinal and final rounds being contested as two distinct four-team brackets (designated as Upper and Lower, with both a championship and consolation game held for each) at a central location. Throughout the duration of the challenge (excluding 2009) the semifinal and final rounds were held at the Sears Centre Arena (currently named NOW® Arena) in Hoffman Estates, Illinois. In 2009 the village of Hoffman Estates acquired the Sears Centre Arena through a Deed in Lieu of Foreclosure process; because of this, that iteration was moved to UIC Pavilion (currently named Credit Union 1 Arena) in Chicago, Illinois.

The tournament was owned and operated by Basketball Tournaments, Inc.

== Tournament history ==
=== Champions ===
Year	Teams
2006	Illinois
2007	Xavier
2009	Northwestern
2010	Richmond
2011	Wisconsin

== Brackets ==
* – Denotes overtime period

=== 2011 ===
Eleventh ranked Wisconsin won the final edition of the tournament 73–56 victory over BYU.

==== First and Second Rounds ====
First Round		Second Round
		Bradley	66
Bradley	68	Wofford	70
UMKC	58

First Round			Second Round
			11	Wisconsin	77
14	Wisconsin	69		UMKC	31
	Wofford	33

First Round		Second Round
		BYU	90
BYU	92	Prairie View A&M	51
Longwood	60

First Round		Second Round
		Nevada	80
Nevada	60	Longwood	78
Prairie View A&M	47

First and Second Round Game played at on campus sites

===== Championship Round =====
Upper Bracket; November 23
Bradley	44
11	Wisconsin	66
BYU	76
Nevada	55

First Place Game; November 24
11	Wisconsin	73
BYU	56
3rd place game November 24
Bradley	59
Nevada	64

Lower Bracket; November 23
Longwood	70
Prairie View A&M	67
UMKC	64
Wofford	58

Fifth Place Game; November 24
Longwood	53
UMKC	93
Seventh Place Game; November 24
Prairie View A&M	49
Wofford	56

=== 2010 ===
Richmond was crowned champions of the 2010 Chicago Invitational Challenge as the Spiders upset tenth ranked Purdue 65–54.

==== First and Second Rounds ====
First Round			Second Round
			14	Purdue	82
10	Purdue	87		Oakland	67
	Austin Peay	65

First Round		Second Round
		Southern Illinois	85
Southern Illinois	72	Charleston Southern	67
Austin Peay	65

First Round		Second Round
		Richmond	81
Richmond	82	Southern	40
Charleston Southern	71

First Round		Second Round
		Wright State	66
Wright State	82	Southern	43
Austin Peay	79

First and Second Round Game played at on campus sites

===== Championship Round =====
Upper Bracket; November 26
10	Purdue	79
Southern Illinois	60
Richmond	71
Wright State	61

First Place Game; November 27
10	Purdue	54
Richmond	65
3rd place game November 24
Southern Illinois	56
Wright State	50

Lower Bracket; November 26
Austin Peay	70
Charleston Southern	64
Oakland	105
Southern	53

Fifth Place Game; November 27
Austin Peay	70
Oakland	78*
Seventh Place Game; November 27
Charleston Southern	89
Southern	54

=== 2009 ===
With the temporary closing of Sears Centre Arena on October 1, 2009, The fourth annual Chicago Invitational Challenge was moved to UIC Pavilion in Chicago, Illinois. Northwestern defeated Iowa State 67–65 in the championship game.

==== First and Second Rounds ====
First Round		Second Round
		Iowa State	84
Iowa State	96	Tennessee State	53
Mississippi Valley State	55

First Round		Second Round
		Northwestern	69
Northwestern	69	Tennessee State	62
Liberty	53

First Round			Second Round
			Notre Dame	80
23	Notre Dame	91	Kennesaw State	62
	Liberty	72

First Round		Second Round
		Saint Louis	75
Saint Louis	76	Mississippi Valley State	39
Kennesaw State	66

First and Second Round Game played at on campus sites

===== Championship Round =====
Upper Bracket; November 27
Iowa State	65
Saint Louis	54
Northwestern	72
23	Notre Dame	71

First Place Game; November 28
Iowa State	65
Northwestern	67
3rd place game November 28
Saint Louis	52
23	Notre Dame	64

Lower Bracket; November 27
Kennesaw State	67
Tennessee State	73
Liberty	72
Mississippi Valley State	53

Fifth Place Game; November 28
Tennessee State	60
Liberty	63
Seventh Place Game; November 24
Kennesaw State	85
Mississippi Valley State	68

=== 2008 ===
The third Chicago Invitational Challenge was held in a non-bracket format for the upper bracket, with matchups set prior to the tournament, the lower bracket was still held as a four team tournament.

==== First and Second Rounds ====
First Round		Second Round
		Auburn	61
Auburn	74	Bethune–Cookman	46
Mercer	78

First Round		Second Round
		Dayton	71
Dayton	78	Mercer	53
Bethune–Cookman	38

First Round			Second Round
			15	Marquette	85
15	Marquette	106		Texas Southern	68
	Chicago State	87

First Round		Second Round
		Northern Iowa	74
Northern Iowa	81	Texas Southern	67
Chicago State	70

First and Second Round Game played at on campus sites

===== Championship Round =====
November 28
Dayton	60
Auburn	59*
15	Marquette	73
Northern Iowa	43

November 29
Northern Iowa	67
Auburn	61
Dayton	89
15	Marquette	75

Lower Bracket; November 28
Bethune-Cookman	64
Chicago State	79
Mercer	71
Texas Southern	68

Fifth Place Game; November 29
Chicago State	77
Mercer	88
3rd place game November 27
Bethune-Cookman	68
Texas Southern	61

=== 2007 ===
Xavier won the second Chicago Invitational Challenge defeating eighth ranked Indiana 80–65 in the championship game.

==== First and Second Rounds ====
First Round		Second Round
		Illinois State	90
Illinois State	89	Southeast Missouri State	71
UNC Wilmington	73

First Round			Second Round
			8	Indiana	95
8	Indiana	100		UNC Wilmington	71
	Longwood	49

First Round		Second Round
		Kent State	80
Kent State	74	Longwood	62
Coppin State	51

First Round		Second Round
		Xavier	90
Xavier	98	Southeast Missouri State	59
Coppin State	49

First and Second Round Game played at on campus sites

===== Championship Round =====
Upper Bracket; November 23
Illinois State	57
8	Indiana	70
Kent State	65
Xavier	78

First Place Game; November 24
8	Indiana	65
Xavier	80
3rd place game November 24
Illinois State	59
Kent State	65

Lower Bracket; November 23
Coppin State	102
Southeast Missouri State	99
Longwood	65
UNC Wilmington	80

Fifth Place Game; November 24
Coppin State	57
UNC Wilmington	78
3rd place game November 24
Southeast Missouri State	59
Longwood	65

=== 2006 ===
Illinois won the inaugural Chicago Invitational Challenge defeating Bradley 75–71 in the championship game.

==== First and Second Rounds ====
First Round		Second Round
		Bradley	81
Bradley	107	UIC	72
Florida A&M	75

Finals
Rutgers	70
Jackson State	71

Finals
Illinois	84
Florida A&M	63

Finals
Illinois	76
Jackson State	55

November 23
Illinois	81
Savannah State	34

First Round		Second Round
		Miami (Ohio)	72
Miami (Ohio)	52	UIC	61
Florida A&M	33

First and Second Round Game played at on campus sites

===== Championship Round =====
Upper Bracket; November 24
Bradley	101
Rutgers	72
Illinois	51
Miami (Ohio)	49

Championship Game; November 25
Bradley	71
Illinois	75
3rd place game November 25
Rutgers	44
Miami (Ohio)	57

Lower Bracket; November 24
Florida A&M	57
UIC	75
Jackson State	72
Savannah State	71

Fifth Place Game; November 25
UIC	68
Jackson State	71
Seventh Place Game; November 24
Florida A&M	74
Savannah State	65
