= 2010 SWAC men's basketball tournament =

- Tournament logo
- Classification: Division I
- Season: 2009–10
- Teams: 8
- Site: CenturyTel Center; Bossier City, Louisiana
- Champions: Arkansas–Pine Bluff (1st title)
- Winning coach: George Ivory (1st title)
- Television: ESPNU

2009–10 SWAC men's basketball standings
| | Conf. | | | | Overall |
| Team | W | | L | PCT | W | | L | PCT |
|---|---|---|---|---|---|---|---|---|
| Jackson State | 17 | – | 1 | .944 | 19 | – | 12 | .613 |
| Arkansas–Pine Bluff† | 16 | – | 4 | .800 | 17 | – | 15 | .531 |
| Alabama State | 12 | – | 7 | .632 | 15 | – | 15 | .500 |
| Prairie View A&M | 11 | – | 7 | .611 | 16 | – | 13 | .552 |
| Texas Southern | 12 | – | 8 | .600 | 16 | – | 16 | .500 |
| Alabama A&M | 8 | – | 10 | .444 | 11 | – | 15 | .423 |
| Mississippi Valley State | 8 | – | 10 | .444 | 9 | – | 23 | .281 |
| Grambling State | 4 | – | 15 | .211 | 7 | – | 21 | .250 |
| Southern | 3 | – | 15 | .167 | 5 | – | 25 | .167 |
| Alcorn State | 2 | – | 16 | .111 | 2 | – | 29 | .065 |
† 2010 SWAC tournament winner As of March 13, 2010; Rankings from AP Poll

The 2010 Southwestern Athletic Conference men's basketball tournament took place March 10–13 at the CenturyTel Center in Bossier City, Louisiana. The winner of the tournament, Arkansas–Pine Bluff, received the Southwestern Athletic Conference's automatic bid to the 2010 NCAA tournament. The Championship game was broadcast on ESPNU.

== Bracket ==
Quarterfinals; March 10–11
1 | Jackson State | 57
8 | Grambling State | 65
4 | Prairie View A&M | 49
5 | Texas Southern | 66
3 | Alabama State | 56
6 | Alabama A&M | 45
2 | Arkansas–Pine Bluff | 69
7 | Mississippi Valley State | 66

Semifinals; March 12
8 | Grambling State | 57
5 | Texas Southern | 60
3 | Alabama State | 44
2 | Arkansas–Pine Bluff | 46

Finals; March 13
5 | Texas Southern | 38
2 | Arkansas–Pine Bluff | 50
