= Arkansas–Pine Bluff Golden Lions men's basketball =

Arkansas–Pine Bluff Golden Lions
2026–27 Arkansas–Pine Bluff Golden Lions men's basketball team
- University: University of Arkansas at Pine Bluff
- Head coach: Solomon Bozeman (6th season)
- Location: Pine Bluff, Arkansas
- Arena: K. L. Johnson Complex (capacity: 4,500)
- Conference: SWAC
- Nickname: Golden Lions
- Colors: Black and gold

NCAA Division I tournament appearances
- Division I 2010*; Division II; 1967

Conference tournament champions
- 2010*

Conference regular-season champions
- 1967

Uniforms
Home	Away
- * vacated by NCAA

The Arkansas–Pine Bluff Golden Lions men's basketball team is the men's basketball team that represents the University of Arkansas at Pine Bluff in Pine Bluff, Arkansas, United States. The school's team currently competes in the Southwestern Athletic Conference and led the conference in average home attendance for six consecutive years (2009–2015). Arkansas Pine-Bluff has been a member of the SWAC since 1997, after leaving it in 1970. In their two tenures in the SWAC, they won the regular season once in 1967 and the SWAC men's basketball tournament in 2010.

== Postseason results ==
=== NCAA Division I ===
The Golden Lions have appeared in the NCAA tournament one time. Their record is 1–1. This appearance was later vacated by the NCAA for allowing ineligible players to participate.

Year	Seed	Round	Opponent	Result
2010	#16	Opening Round; First Round	#16 Winthrop #1 Duke	W 61–44; L 44–73

=== NCAA Division II ===
During their time in Division II as Arkansas AM&N, the team appeared in the NCAA Division II men's basketball tournament one time. Their record was 0–2.

Year	Round	Opponent	Result
1967	Regional Semifinals; Regional Third Place	Southwest Missouri State; Arkansas State	L 80–83; L 93–105
