= Normal, Alabama =

- Neighborhood
- Interactive map of Normal, Alabama
- Coordinates: 34°47′20″N 86°34′19″W
- Country: United States of America
- State: Alabama
- Counties: Madison
- Established: 1890
- Named for: "Normal" school
- Demonym: Normalite
- Time zone: UTC-6 (CST)
  - Summer (DST): UTC-5 (CDT)
- ZIP codes: 35762
- Area codes: 256, 938

Normal, Alabama, is the home of Alabama Agricultural and Mechanical University (AAMU), the largest HBCU in Alabama. The university is situated in Huntsville, Alabama's northern city limits in Madison County.

Normal was established in 1890, when AAMU was then known as State Normal and Industrial School of Huntsville. It was designated a land grant college of Alabama. At that time student enrollment was 300 with 11 teachers. That same year, a United States Post Office was established there. Normal's ZIP Code is 35762. Students were called "Normalites". While Normal does not have any official boundaries, it usually consists of the Alabama A&M campus and some adjacent areas.
