= Elmore Gymnasium =

Multi-purpose arena in Normal, Alabama

T. M. Elmore Gymnasium and Health Sciences Complex
- The Dog House
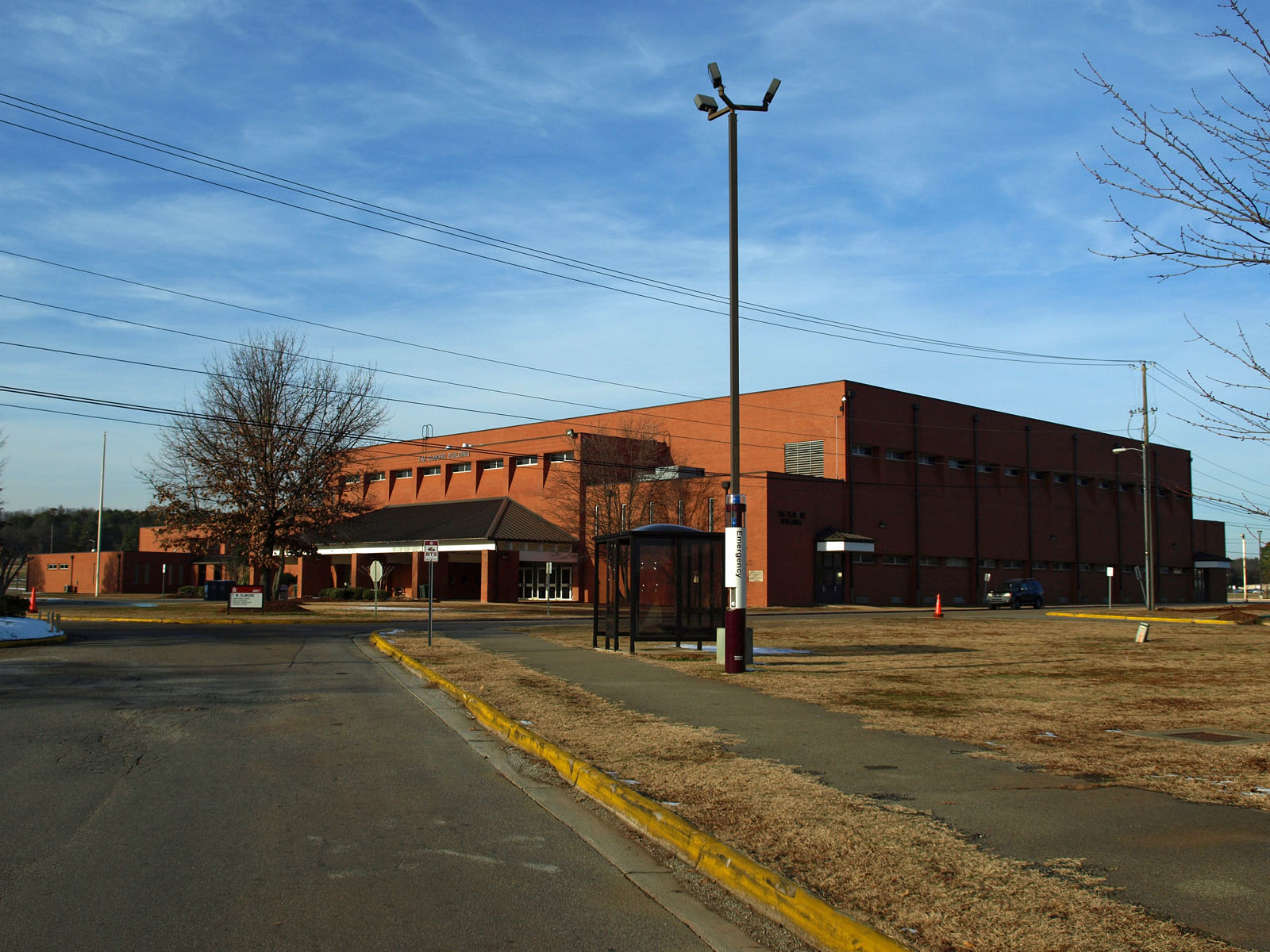
- Interactive map of T. M. Elmore Gymnasium and Health Sciences Complex
- Full name: T. M. Elmore Gymnasium
- Location: 4900 Meridian St N Normal, Alabama, 35762 US
- Coordinates: 34.7852°N 86.5752°W
- Operator: Alabama A&M University
- Capacity: 6,000

Tenants
- Alabama A&M Bulldogs volleyball Alabama A&M Bulldogs basketball 1974-2022; Alabama A&M Lady Bulldogs basketball (1974-2022)

T. M. Elmore Gymnasium is a 6,000-seat multi-purpose arena in Normal, the northern part of Huntsville, Alabama, United States. It is home to the Alabama A&M University Bulldogs women's volleyball team, and was also home to the A&M men's and women's basketball teams before their 2022 move to the new Alabama A&M Events Center. The gymnasium is informally known as "The Dog House" due to the hot temperature and loud environment for opposing teams. In February 1996, Elmore Gymnasium was ranked the "fourth-toughest place to play" in NCAA Division II basketball by Division II Bulletin. The three venues ranked ahead of it were Althouse Hall at Philadelphia Textile (now known as Jefferson); the Owensboro Sportscenter, a municipally-owned venue used by Kentucky Wesleyan College; and the DakotaDome at the now-Division I University of South Dakota (no longer used for basketball since the 2016 opening of the adjacent Sanford Coyote Sports Center). The gymnasium also hosts numerous other civic and institutional activities from concerts and pep rallies, to guest speakers and convocations. The building also houses classrooms, office space, training facilities and the Physical Education department.

As a concert venue, Elmore Gymnasium can seat up to 7,000. It was built in 1974, around the same time as the much larger Von Braun Center which opened the next year, and thus Elmore is often used as an alternative venue to the VBC.

== See also ==
- List of NCAA Division I basketball arenas
