= F. G. Clark Center =

Arena in Baton Rouge, Louisiana

F. G. Clark Activity Center
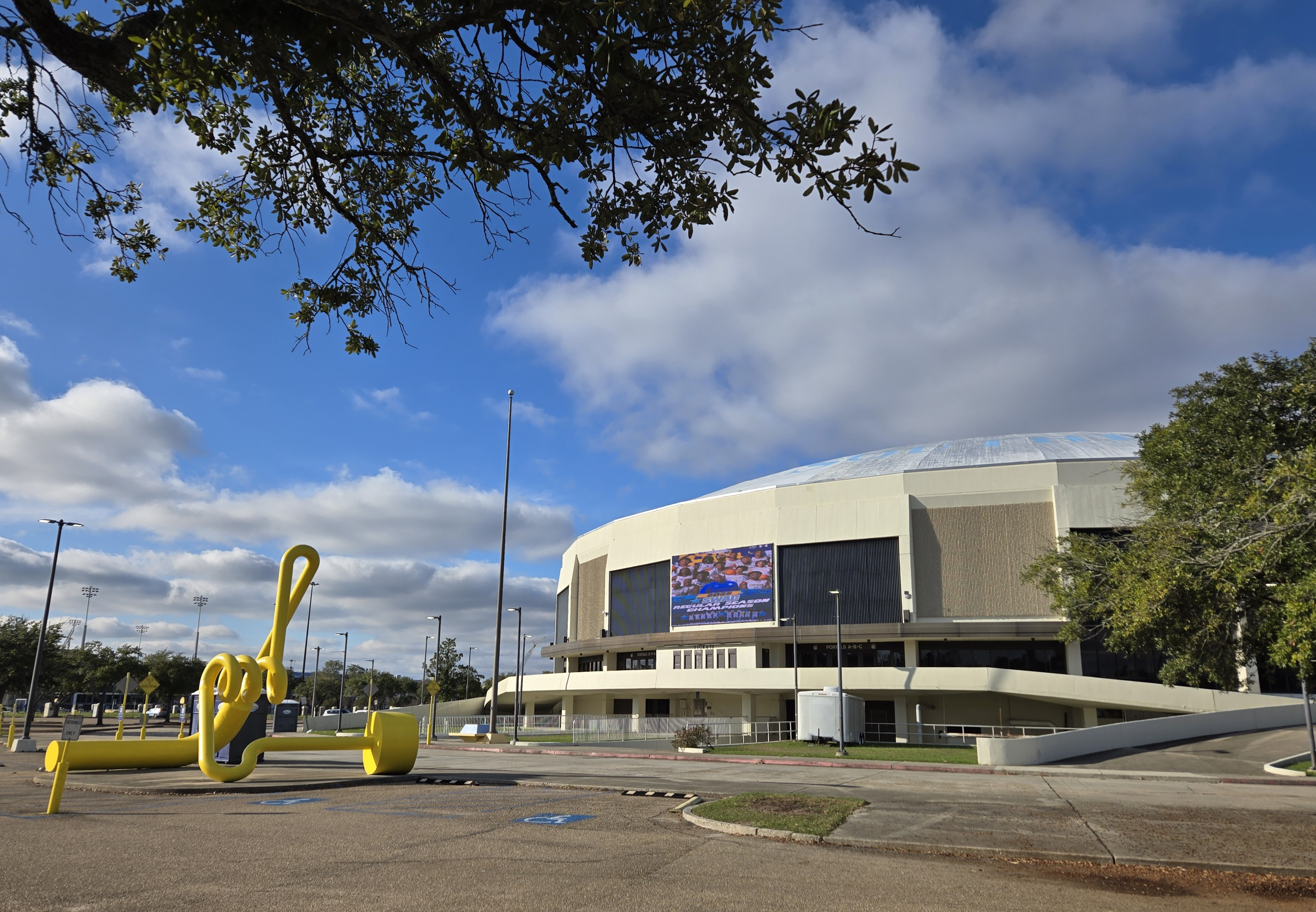
- Interactive map of F. G. Clark Activity Center
- Coordinates: 30°31′18″N 91°11′8″W
- Owner: Southern University
- Operator: Southern University
- Capacity: 7,500
- Surface: Hardwood

Construction
- Opened: 1975

Tenants
- Southern Jaguars basketball (NCAA) (1975–present); Southern Lady Jaguars basketball (NCAA)

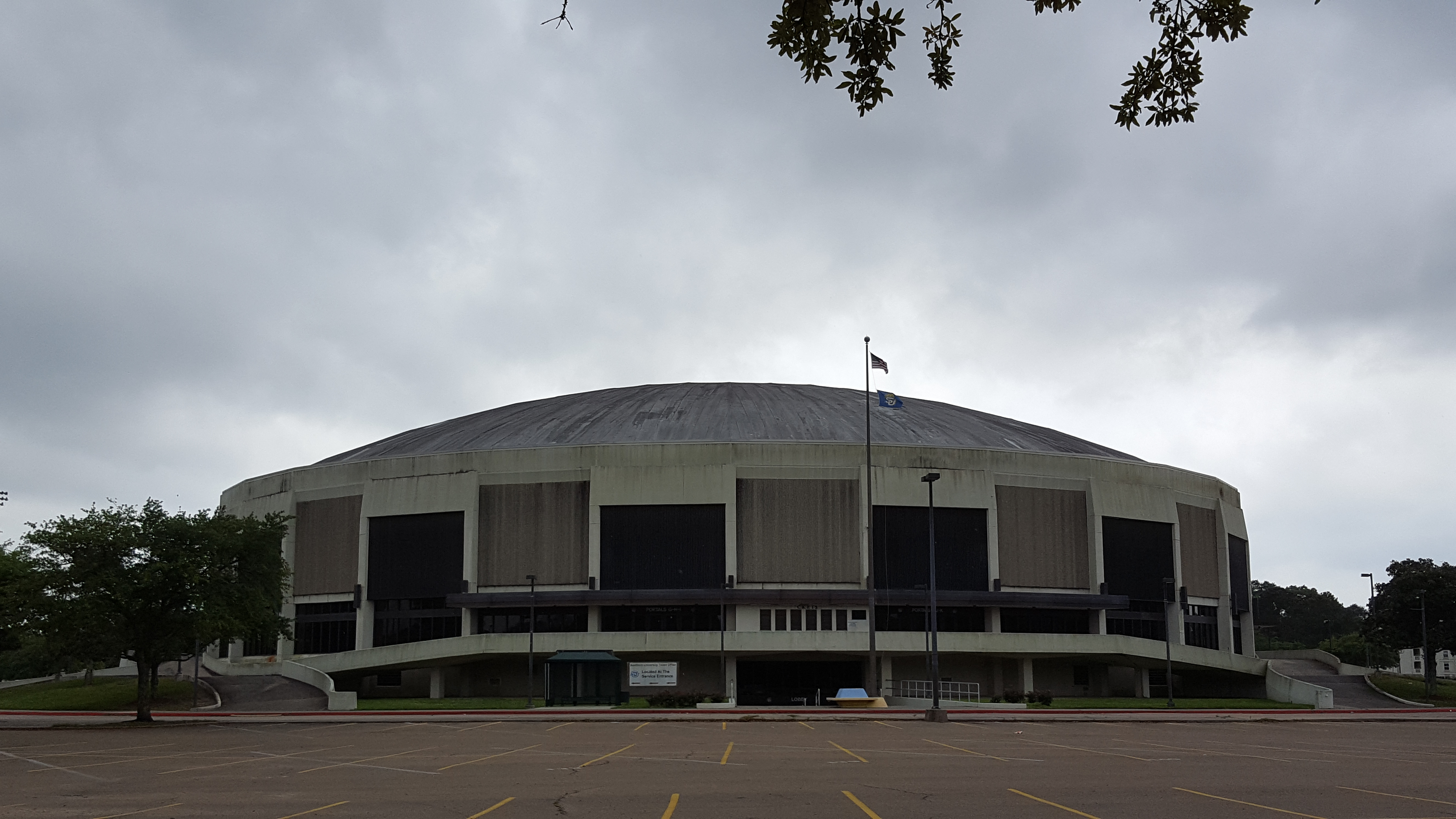
F. G. Clark Activity Center

The F. G. Clark Activity Center is a 7,500-seat multi-purpose arena in Baton Rouge, Louisiana, that opened in 1975. It is home to two Southern University basketball teams, the Southern Jaguars and Southern Lady Jaguars. The arena also holds concerts and other events.

The arena is named for Dr. Felton Grandison Clark, who was the second president of Southern University after it had been designated as a land-grant college, serving from 1938 to 1969.

== See also ==
- List of NCAA Division I basketball arenas
- List of music venues
