= Dunn–Oliver Acadome =

Arena in Montgomery, Alabama, United States

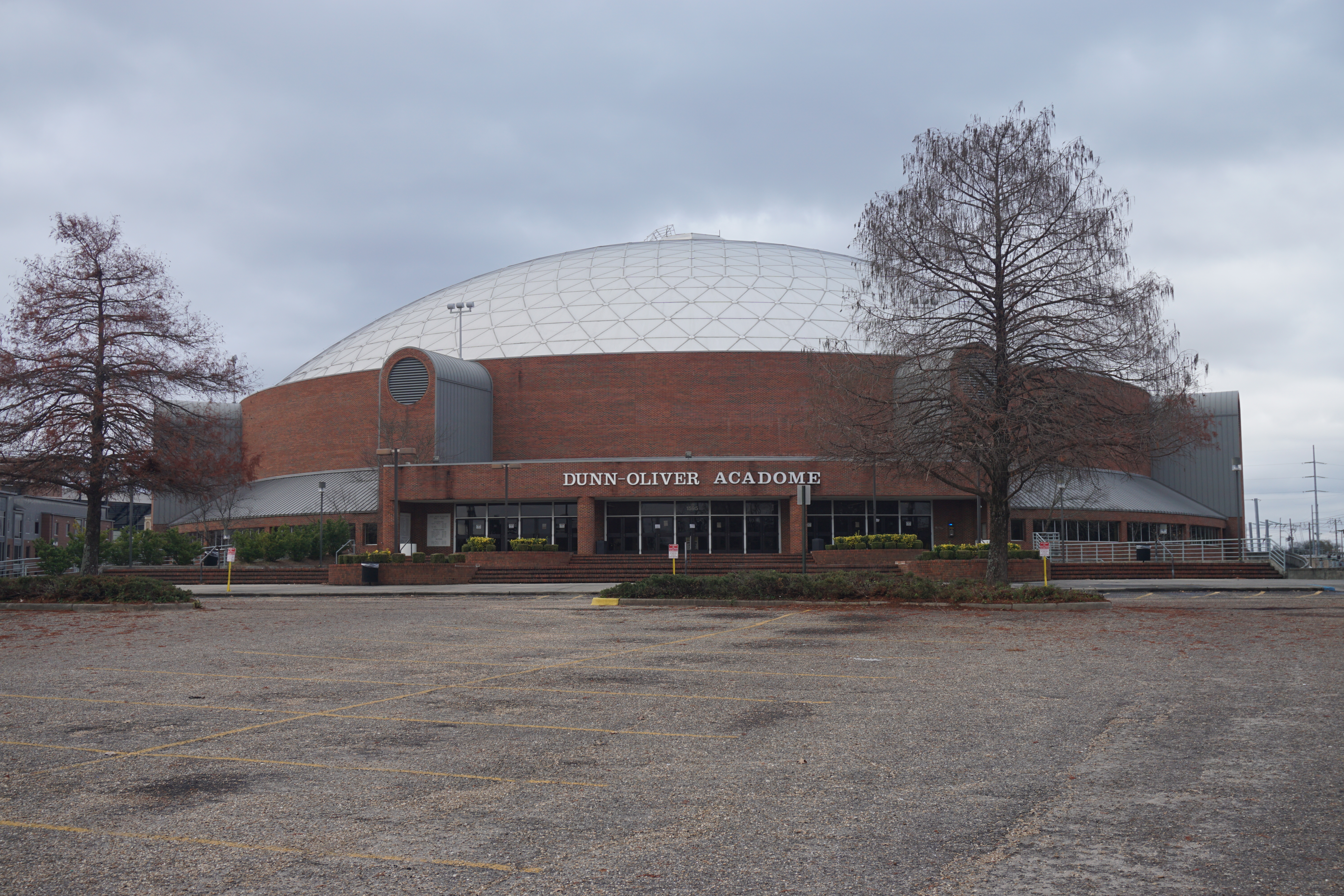
- Interactive map of Dunn–Oliver Acadome
- Former names: Joe. L. Reed Acadome (1992–2008)
- Location: Montgomery, Alabama
- Coordinates: 32.36185°N 86.293158°W
- Operator: Alabama State University
- Capacity: 7,400

Construction
- Opened: 1992

Tenant
- Alabama State Hornets and Lady Hornets

The Dunn–Oliver Acadome is a 7,400-seat multi-purpose arena in Montgomery, Alabama. Opened in 1992, it is home to the Alabama State Hornets basketball team of Alabama State University. In October 1996, the Acadome hosted an NBA preseason game between the Atlanta Hawks and Los Angeles Clippers.

From its opening until May 2008, it was named the Joe L. Reed Acadome, after Joe L. Reed, who played a significant, high-profile leadership role at ASU. In 2008, the Alabama State Board of Trustees voted to remove Reed's name from the building, based upon claims that Reed gave the university negative publicity and wasted taxpayer money by filing too many frivolous lawsuits. The trustees renamed the court in honor of the university's two most successful basketball coaches, Charles Johnson "C.J." Dunn and James V. Oliver. This furthered a debate between members of the board and Reed's supporters. In the 2009 legislative session, two legislators filed bills to restore Reed's name to the building, but both were withdrawn.

== See also ==
- List of NCAA Division I basketball arenas
