= Davey Whitney Complex =

Sports venue in Lorman, Mississippi

- Interactive map of Davey Whitney Complex
- Location: 1000 Asu Drive, Lorman, MS 39096
- Coordinates: 31.873225°N 91.13318°W
- Capacity: 7,000
- Surface: Hardwood

Tenant
- Alcorn State Braves

Davey Whitney Complex is a 7,000-seat multi-purpose arena and physical education center in Lorman, Mississippi. It was built in 1975 and is home to the Alcorn State University Braves men's and women's basketball teams and women's volleyball team.

The Physical Education Complex was built at a cost of $3.5 million. The new facility added much-needed seating capacity and classroom space, as well as an Olympic-size swimming pool. The first game in the complex was the final game of the 1974–75 men's basketball season.

Nicknamed the "Scalping Grounds", stylized later as the Scalpin' Grounds, it was renamed in 1993 after Davey Whitney, who coached the Braves from 1969 to 1989. Whitney returned to Alcorn for a second stint from 1996 to 2003, making him one of the few Division I coaches to have coached in an arena or stadium named for him.

== See also ==
- List of NCAA Division I basketball arenas
