= List of Alabama State Hornets basketball head coaches =

The following is a list of Alabama State Hornets basketball head coaches. The Hornets have had 13 coaches in their 87-season history.

Alabama State's current head coach is Tony Madlock. He was hired in April 2022 to replace Mo Williams, who left to take the same position at Jackson State.

No.	Tenure	Coach	Years	Record	Pct.
1	1934–1955; 1958–1963	C. J. Dunn	22	257–193	.571
2	1955–1958	Ika Moorehead	3	70–20	.778
3	1963–1967	Lucias Mitchell	4	72–28	.720
4	1967–1968	Ben Jobe	1	18–7	.720
5	1968–1969	Willie Parker	1	19–9	.679
6	1969–1974	Bernard Boozer	5	101–36	.737
7	1974–1977	Floyd Laisure	3	52–32	.619
8	1978–1995	James Oliver	17	291–181	.617
9	1995–1996	John L. Williams	1	9–18	.333
10	1996–2005	Rob Spivery	9	129–136	.487
11	2005–2020	Lewis Jackson	15	207–262	.441
12	2020–2022	Mo Williams	2	13–35	.271
13	2022–2026	Tony Madlock	4	51–80	.389
Totals		13 coaches	87 seasons	1,289–1,047	.552
Records updated through end of 2025–26 season Source
