= 2022–23 Alabama State Hornets basketball team =

American college basketball season

2022–23 Alabama State Hornets basketball
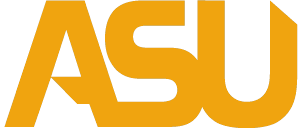
- Conference: Southwestern Athletic Conference
- Record: 8–23 (6–12 SWAC)
- Head coach: Tony Madlock (1st season)
- Assistant coaches: Tyrone Levett; Mardracus Wade; Ed Stephens
- Home arena: Dunn–Oliver Acadome

2022–23 SWAC men's basketball standings
	Conf.				Overall
Team	W		L	PCT	W		L	PCT
Alcorn State	15	–	3	.833	18	–	14	.563
Grambling State	15	–	3	.833	24	–	9	.727
Jackson State	12	–	6	.667	14	–	19	.424
Southern	11	–	7	.611	15	–	17	.469
Alabama A&M	10	–	8	.556	15	–	18	.455
Prairie View A&M	9	–	9	.500	13	–	19	.406
Bethune–Cookman	8	–	10	.444	12	–	20	.375
Texas Southern †	7	–	11	.389	14	–	21	.400
Alabama State	6	–	12	.333	8	–	23	.258
Arkansas–Pine Bluff	6	–	12	.333	10	–	21	.323
Florida A&M	5	–	13	.278	7	–	22	.241
Mississippi Valley State	4	–	14	.222	5	–	27	.156
† 2023 SWAC tournament winner

The 2022–23 Alabama State Hornets basketball team represented Alabama State University in the 2022–23 NCAA Division I men's basketball season. The Hornets, led by first-year head coach Tony Madlock, played their home games at the Dunn–Oliver Acadome in Montgomery, Alabama as members of the Southwestern Athletic Conference (SWAC).

The Hornets finished the season 8–23, 6–12 in SWAC play, to finish in a tie for ninth place. They failed to qualify for the SWAC tournament, since only the top eight teams are qualified to compete.

== Previous season ==
The Hornets finished the 2021–22 season 9–21, 8–10 in SWAC play to finish in a tie for eighth place. They failed to qualify for the SWAC tournament.

On April 9, after just two years as the helm, head coach Mo Williams announced his resignation. Two days later, on April 11, South Carolina State head coach Tony Madlock, was announced as the Hornets' next head coach.

== Roster ==
2022–23 Alabama State Hornets men's basketball team
Players
Coaches

Pos.	#	Name	Height	Weight	Year	Previous school	Hometown
G	0	Alex Anderson	6 ft 6 in (1.98 m)	205 lb (93 kg)	So	South Alabama	Memphis, TN
G	1	Amarr Knox	6 ft 3 in (1.91 m)	170 lb (77 kg)	Fr	Bartlett HS	Memphis, TN
F	2	Jordan O'Neal	6 ft 7 in (2.01 m)	210 lb (95 kg)	Jr	Coahoma CC	Mobile, AL
G	3	Christian McCray	6 ft 6 in (1.98 m)	185 lb (84 kg)	RS Sr	Cal State Fullerton	Las Vegas, NV
F	4	Duane Posey	6 ft 7 in (2.01 m)	215 lb (98 kg)	Jr	Kilgore College	Memphis, TN
G	5	Kendal Parker	6 ft 4 in (1.93 m)	180 lb (82 kg)	Fr	Carver HS	Montgomery, AL
G	10	Ashton McClelland	6 ft 0 in (1.83 m)	150 lb (68 kg)	GS	Texas Southern	Houston, TX
G	11	Damien Madison	6 ft 0 in (1.83 m)	177 lb (80 kg)	GS	Huntingdon College	Montgomery, AL
G	12	Malik Smiley	6 ft 3 in (1.91 m)	165 lb (75 kg)	RS Jr	IMG Academy	Birmingham, AL
G	14	Roland McCoy	6 ft 2 in (1.88 m)	205 lb (93 kg)	Jr	Iowa Western CC	Chicago, IL
G	20	TJ Madlock	6 ft 3 in (1.91 m)	190 lb (86 kg)	So	South Carolina State	Memphis, TN
F	22	Darrell Reed	6 ft 8 in (2.03 m)	215 lb (98 kg)	RS Fr	Hammond HS	Hammond, IN
G	24	Isaiah Range	6 ft 4 in (1.93 m)	215 lb (98 kg)	Jr	Tarleton State	Cedar Hill, TX
F	25	Jasteven Walker	6 ft 10 in (2.08 m)	190 lb (86 kg)	Fr	Fayette Ware HS	Oakland, TN
F	30	Eric Coleman	6 ft 8 in (2.03 m)	210 lb (95 kg)	Jr	South Plains College	Buford, GA
F	55	Keyon Wesley	6 ft 9 in (2.06 m)	205 lb (93 kg)	GS	Arkansas State	Chesilhurst, NJ

Head coach

- Tony Madlock (Memphis)

Assistant coach(es)

- Tyrone Levett (Alabama State)
- Mardracus Wade (Arkansas)
- Ed Stephens (South Carolina State)

Legend

- (C) Team captain
- (S) Suspended
- (I) Ineligible
- (W) Walk-on
- Injured
- Current redshirt

Roster
Last update: December 20, 2022

== Schedule and results ==
Date time, TV	Rank^{#}	Opponent^{#}	Result	Record	High points	High rebounds	High assists	Site (attendance) city, state
Exhibition
October 31, 2022*; 7:00 p.m.		Huntingdon	W 101–46	–	17 – O'Neal	8 – Posey	5 – Range	Dunn–Oliver Acadome (317); Montgomery, AL
Non-conference regular season
November 7, 2022*; 6:30 p.m., CUSA.tv		at UAB	L 70–111	0–1	25 – Madlock	6 – Wesley	5 – Anderson	Bartow Arena (3,991); Birmingham, AL
November 12, 2022*; 10:00 p.m., P12N		at USC; Pac-12/SWAC Legacy Series	L 58–96	0–2	12 – Posey	6 – McCray	9 – Anderson	Galen Center (2,076); Los Angeles, CA
November 13, 2022*; 4:00 p.m., WCC Network		at Pepperdine	L 62–91	0–3	17 – Madlock	6 – Anderson	3 – McCoy	Firestone Fieldhouse (568); Malibu, CA
November 15, 2022*; 9:00 p.m., Stadium		at San Jose State	L 57–70	0–4	18 – Range	5 – Anderson	2 – 2 tied	Provident Credit Union Event Center (1,587); San Jose, CA
November 18, 2022*; 7:00 p.m.		Carver	Canceled					Dunn–Oliver Acadome; Montgomery, AL
November 20, 2022*; 1:00 p.m., ESPN+		at Pittsburgh	L 54–73	0–5	16 – Madlock	12 – Madlock	3 – 2 tied	Petersen Events Center (5,558); Pittsburgh, PA
November 23, 2022*; 6:00 p.m., ESPN+		at Duquesne	L 57–75	0–6	10 – 2 tied	8 – Anderson	4 – Madlock	UPMC Cooper Fieldhouse (1,784); Pittsburgh, PA
November 26, 2022*; 1:00 p.m., YouTube		vs. Eastern Illinois; Ohio University MTE	W 67–58	1–6	18 – Knox	8 – 2 tied	3 – 2 tied	Convocation Center (126); Athens, OH
November 27, 2022*; 1:00 p.m., ESPN+		at Ohio; Ohio University MTE	L 58–72	1–7	26 – Range	8 – Posey	3 – Anderson	Convocation Center (2,729); Athens, OH
December 7, 2022*; 6:00 p.m., ESPN+		at North Alabama	L 63–71	1–8	27 – Range	7 – Madlock	5 – Madlock	Flowers Hall (556); Florence, AL
December 17, 2022*; 1:00 p.m., ESPN+		at Georgia Tech	L 60–96	1–9	12 – Anderson	11 – Madlock	4 – Madlock	McCamish Pavilion (3,798); Atlanta, GA
December 19, 2022*; 7:00 p.m., ESPN+		at Arkansas State	L 65–72	1–10	14 – Anderson	7 – Anderson	7 – Madlock	First National Bank Arena (2,072); Jonesboro, AR
December 21, 2022*; 7:00 p.m., ESPN+		at Memphis	L 61–83	1–11	16 – 2 tied	10 – 2 tied	5 – Madlock	FedExForum (10,193); Memphis, TN
December 29, 2022*; 3:00 p.m.		Lane	W 90–78	2–11	31 – Range	13 – Posey	5 – Madlock	Dunn–Oliver Acadome (345); Montgomery, AL
SWAC regular season
January 2, 2023; 5:30 p.m.		Mississippi Valley State	W 70–61	3–11 (1–0)	23 – Madlock	8 – O'Neal	4 – Range	Dunn–Oliver Acadome (438); Montgomery, AL
January 4, 2023; 7:30 p.m.		Arkansas–Pine Bluff	W 80–66	4–11 (2–0)	18 – O'Neal	18 – O'Neal	7 – Anderson	Dunn–Oliver Acadome (417); Montgomery, AL
January 7, 2023; 5:00 p.m.		at Jackson State	L 58–61	4–12 (2–1)	14 – Range	8 – Range	4 – Madlock	Williams Assembly Center (1,892); Jackson, MS
January 9, 2023; 7:30 p.m.		at Alcorn State	L 76–92	4–13 (2–2)	13 – Anderson	6 – Anderson	5 – Anderson	Davey Whitney Complex (560); Lorman, MS
January 16, 2023; 3:30 p.m.		vs. Alabama A&M; Bridge Builder Classic	W 69–61	5–13 (3–2)	18 – Range	9 – O'Neal	5 – Madlock	Mitchell Center; Mobile, AL
January 21, 2023; 5:30 p.m.		Prairie View A&M	W 56–55 ^{OT}	6–13 (4–2)	11 – O'Neal	13 – O'Neal	3 – Madison	Dunn–Oliver Acadome (748); Montgomery, AL
January 23, 2023; 7:30 p.m.		Texas Southern	L 65–71	6–14 (4–3)	15 – Madlock	11 – O'Neal	4 – Madlock	Dunn–Oliver Acadome (1,022); Montgomery, AL
January 28, 2023; 5:00 p.m.		at Bethune–Cookman	L 62–64	6–15 (4–4)	18 – Range	6 – O'Neal	3 – Madlock	Moore Gymnasium (669); Daytona Beach, FL
January 30, 2023; 8:00 p.m.		at Florida A&M	L 58–69	6–16 (4–5)	16 – Range	5 – Tied	3 – McCoy	Al Lawson Center (2,128); Tallahassee, FL
February 4, 2023; 5:30 p.m.		Grambling State	L 60–73	6–17 (4–6)	18 – Madlock	10 – Madlock	5 – Anderson	Dunn–Oliver Acadome (1,345); Montgomery, AL
February 6, 2023; 7:30 p.m.		Southern	W 73–66	7–17 (5–6)	19 – Anderson	8 – O'Neal	6 – Madlock	Dunn–Oliver Acadome (1,242); Montgomery, AL
February 11, 2023; 3:30 p.m.		at Arkansas–Pine Bluff	W 74–71	8–17 (6–6)	29 – Anderson	5 – O'Neal	3 – Anderson	H.O. Clemmons Arena (2,631); Pine Bluff, AR
February 13, 2023; 7:30 p.m.		at Mississippi Valley State	L 70–76	8–18 (6–7)	15 – Anderson	8 – Tied	2 – Tied	Harrison HPER Complex (1,024); Itta Bena, MS
February 18, 2023; 5:30 p.m.		Florida A&M	L 54–60	8–19 (6–8)	14 – Posey	12 – O'Neal	4 – Madlock	Dunn–Oliver Acadome; Montgomery, AL
February 20, 2023; 7:30 p.m.		Bethune–Cookman	L 65–70	8–20 (6–9)	19 – Madlock	8 – Coleman	9 – Anderson	Dunn–Oliver Acadome (677); Montgomery, AL
February 25, 2023; 5:30 p.m.		Alabama A&M	L 50–55	8–21 (6–10)	18 – McCoy	13 – Madlock	5 – Madlock	Dunn–Oliver Acadome (1,207); Montgomery, AL
March 2, 2023; 8:00 p.m.		at Southern	L 52–66	8–22 (6–11)	11 – Tied	6 – Madlock	3 – O'Neal	F. G. Clark Center (4,389); Baton Rouge, LA
March 4, 2023; 5:30 p.m.		at Grambling State	L 49–69	8–23 (6–12)	13 – O'Neal	6 – O'Neil	2 – Coleman	Fredrick C. Hobdy Assembly Center (1,496); Grambling, LA
*Non-conference game. ^{#}Rankings from AP poll. (#) Tournament seedings in parentheses. All times are in Central.
