= 2024–25 Grambling State Tigers men's basketball team =

American college basketball season

2024–25 Grambling State Tigers men's basketball
- Conference: Southwestern Athletic Conference
- Record: 12–22 (7–11 SWAC)
- Head coach: Donte Jackson (8th season)
- Assistant coaches: Kyle Jones; Devarus Walker; Cameron Prather
- Home arena: Fredrick C. Hobdy Assembly Center

2024–25 SWAC men's basketball standings
	Conf.				Overall
Team	W		L	PCT	W		L	PCT
Southern	15	–	3	.833	20	–	12	.625
Jackson State	14	–	4	.778	16	–	18	.471
Bethune–Cookman	13	–	5	.722	17	–	16	.515
Texas Southern	12	–	6	.667	15	–	17	.469
Alabama State †	12	–	6	.667	20	–	16	.556
Alcorn State	11	–	7	.611	11	–	21	.344
Florida A&M	10	–	8	.556	14	–	17	.452
Grambling State	7	–	11	.389	12	–	22	.353
Alabama A&M	6	–	12	.333	10	–	22	.313
Prairie View A&M	4	–	14	.222	5	–	27	.156
Arkansas–Pine Bluff	3	–	15	.167	6	–	25	.194
Mississippi Valley State	1	–	17	.056	3	–	28	.097
† 2025 SWAC tournament winner

The 2024–25 Grambling State Tigers men's basketball team represented Grambling State University in the 2024–25 NCAA Division I men's basketball season. The Tigers, led by eighth-year head coach Donte Jackson, played their home games at the Fredrick C. Hobdy Assembly Center in Grambling, Louisiana as members of the Southwestern Athletic Conference (SWAC).

The Tigers finished the season 12–22, 7–11 in SWAC play, to finish in eighth place. In the SWAC tournament, they defeated Alabama A&M in the first round and upset top-seeded Southern in the quarterfinals, before falling to eventual tournament champions Alabama State in the semifinals.

On April 3, 2025, it was announced that head coach Donte Jackson would be leaving the program after eight years at the helm, in order to take the head coaching position at Alabama A&M. A week later, on April 10, the school announced that they would be hiring Florida A&M head coach Patrick Crarey as the team's next head coach.

== Previous season ==
The Tigers finished the 2023–24 season 21–15, 14–4 in SWAC play, to win the regular-season championship. As the No. 1 seed in the SWAC tournament, they defeated Alabama State, Bethune–Cookman and Texas Southern to win the SWAC tournament championship; as a result, they received the conference's automatic bid to the NCAA tournament for the first time in school history. As a No. 16 seed in the Midwest region, they defeated Montana State in the First Four, before losing to Purdue in the first round.

== Roster ==
2024–25 Grambling State Tigers men's basketball team
Players
Coaches

Pos.	#	Name	Height	Weight	Year	Hometown
G	00	Kintavious Dozier	6 ft 1 in (1.85 m)	195 lb (88 kg)	Sr	Lanett, AL
G	1	Dupree Fletcher	5 ft 10 in (1.78 m)	190 lb (86 kg)	Fr	Milwaukee, WI
G	2	Mikale Stevenson	6 ft 2 in (1.88 m)	175 lb (79 kg)	Jr	Fort Wayne, IN
G	3	Emareyon McDonald	6 ft 1 in (1.85 m)	180 lb (82 kg)	Jr	Coushatta, LA
G	4	P.J. Edwards	6 ft 4 in (1.93 m)	205 lb (93 kg)	RS Jr	Springfield, IL
G	5	Chilaydrien Newton	6 ft 3 in (1.91 m)	180 lb (82 kg)	RS Fr	Simsboro, LA
F	10	P.J. Eason	6 ft 9 in (2.06 m)	240 lb (109 kg)	Jr	Dadeville, AL
G/F	11	Antwan Burnett	6 ft 5 in (1.96 m)	205 lb (93 kg)	Jr	Montgomery, AL
F	12	Soloman Ray	6 ft 10 in (2.08 m)	235 lb (107 kg)	RS So	Atlanta, GA
F	21	James Graham	6 ft 7 in (2.01 m)	215 lb (98 kg)	Jr	Milwaukee, WI
F	22	Emeka Njaji	6 ft 8 in (2.03 m)	225 lb (102 kg)	RS So	Minneapolis, MN
F	23	Samuel Onu	7 ft 0 in (2.13 m)	265 lb (120 kg)	Jr	Malvern, PA
G	24	Louis Hutchinson	6 ft 6 in (1.98 m)	205 lb (93 kg)	RS So	Upper Marlboro, MD
F	30	James Flippin	6 ft 10 in (2.08 m)	255 lb (116 kg)	Jr	Milwaukee, WI
G	32	Payton Parrish	6 ft 0 in (1.83 m)	180 lb (82 kg)	Sr	Milwaukee, WI
F	55	Ernest Ross	6 ft 9 in (2.06 m)	205 lb (93 kg)	Sr	Alachua, FL

Head coach

- Donte Jackson (Central State)

Assistant coach(es)

- Kyle Jones (Arkansas–Pine Bluff)
- Devarus Walker (William Carey)
- Cameron Prather (Cumberland)

Legend

- (C) Team captain
- (S) Suspended
- (I) Ineligible
- (W) Walk-on
- Injured
- Current redshirt

Roster
Last update: November 11, 2024

== Schedule and results ==
Date time, TV	Rank^{#}	Opponent^{#}	Result	Record	High points	High rebounds	High assists	Site (attendance) city, state
Non-conference regular season
November 4, 2024*; 8:00 p.m.		Southern–New Orleans	W 92–42	1–0	19 – Burnett	8 – Burnett	3 – 2 tied	Fredrick C. Hobdy Assembly Center (2,701); Grambling, LA
November 8, 2024*; 6:00 p.m., SECN		at No. 24 Ole Miss	L 64–66	1–1	16 – Stevenson	9 – Burnett	4 – Stevenson	SJB Pavilion (7,314); Oxford, MS
November 11, 2024*; 6:00 p.m., SECN+		at No. 20 Florida	L 62–86	1–2	19 – Dozier	5 – Dozier	2 – Stevenson	O'Connell Center (7,857); Gainesville, FL
November 21, 2024*; 8:00 p.m., MW Network		at New Mexico; Acrisure Classic on-campus game	L 58–80	1–3	11 – Eason	10 – Eason	8 – Stevenson	The Pit (10,996); Albuquerque, NM
November 24, 2024*; 6:00 p.m., B1G+		at USC; Acrisure Classic on-campus game	L 69–80	1–4	17 – Dozier	6 – Eason	10 – Stevenson	Galen Center (3,068); Los Angeles, CA
November 26, 2024*; 9:00 p.m., ESPN+		at Cal Poly; Acrisure Classic on-campus game	L 79–82	1–5	21 – Burnett	8 – 2 tied	6 – Dozier	Mott Athletics Center (1,128); San Luis Obispo, CA
December 3, 2024*; 6:00 p.m.		Arkansas Baptist	W 82–56	2–5	19 – Burnett	9 – Dozier	9 – Dozier	Fredrick C. Hobdy Assembly Center; Grambling, LA
December 7, 2024*; 4:00 p.m., ESPN+		at Pepperdine	L 57–85	2–6	15 – Burnett	6 – Dozier	3 – 2 tied	Firestone Fieldhouse (366); Malibu, CA
December 16, 2024*; 12:00 p.m., YouTube		Southeastern Louisiana	L 65–75	2–7	16 – 2 tied	4 – 2 tied	4 – 2 tied	Fredrick C. Hobdy Assembly Center (400); Grambling, LA
December 19, 2024*; 6:30 p.m., ESPNU		vs. Delaware State; Chris Paul's HBCU Challenge	L 60–73	2–8	14 – Flippin	6 – 2 tied	3 – Newton	Mohegan Sun Arena; Uncasville, CT
December 20, 2024*; 3:00 p.m., ESPNU		vs. Norfolk State; Chris Paul's HBCU Challenge	L 70–76	2–9	15 – 2 tied	8 – Ross	5 – Stevenson	Mohegan Sun Arena; Uncasville, CT
December 22, 2024*; 3:00 p.m., ESPN+		at No. 19 Cincinnati	L 49–84	2–10	16 – Ross	6 – 2 tied	7 – Stevenson	Fifth Third Arena (11,175); Cincinnati, OH
December 30, 2024*; 12:00 p.m.		Biblical Studies	W 100–55	3–10	21 – Edwards	13 – Eason	5 – Stevenson	Fredrick C. Hobdy Assembly Center (176); Grambling, LA
SWAC regular season
January 4, 2025; 4:30 p.m.		at Prairie View A&M	L 55–73	3–11 (0–1)	15 – Edwards	6 – Edwards	6 – Stevenson	William Nicks Building (426); Prairie View, TX
January 6, 2025; 7:00 p.m., ESPNU/ESPN+		at Texas Southern	L 66–71 ^{OT}	3–12 (0–2)	13 – 2 tied	9 – Stevenson	4 – Stevenson	H&PE Arena; Houston, TX
January 11, 2025; 4:30 p.m.		Bethune–Cookman	L 59–65	3–13 (0–3)	17 – Dozier	10 – Eason	2 – Burnett	Fredrick C. Hobdy Assembly Center (1,200); Grambling, LA
January 13, 2025; 6:30 p.m.		Florida A&M	W 79–72	4–13 (1–3)	18 – Burnett	7 – Eason	4 – Dozier	Fredrick C. Hobdy Assembly Center (1,352); Grambling, LA
January 18, 2025; 4:30 p.m.		at Southern	L 60–67	4–14 (1–4)	15 – Burnett	14 – Burnett	4 – Stevenson	F. G. Clark Center (6,489); Baton Rouge, LA
January 25, 2025; 4:30 p.m.		at Mississippi Valley State	W 65–54	5–14 (2–4)	12 – 2 tied	5 – Burnett	4 – 2 tied	Harrison HPER Complex (2,750); Itta Bena, MS
January 27, 2025; 7:30 p.m.		at Arkansas–Pine Bluff	W 81–77	6–14 (3–4)	18 – Stevenson	9 – Eason	6 – Stevenson	H.O. Clemmons Arena (1,428); Pine Bluff, AR
February 1, 2025; 4:30 p.m.		Jackson State	L 50–65	6–15 (3–5)	14 – Dozier	10 – Stevenson	3 – Stevenson	Fredrick C. Hobdy Assembly Center (2,800); Grambling, LA
February 3, 2024; 6:30 p.m., ESPNU/ESPN+		Alcorn State	L 53–60	6–16 (3–6)	12 – Dozier	7 – Ross	3 – 2 tied	Fredrick C. Hobdy Assembly Center (2,313); Grambling, LA
February 8, 2025; 5:30 p.m.		at Alabama State	W 77–67	7–16 (4–6)	30 – Dozier	10 – 2 tied	4 – Stevenson	Dunn–Oliver Acadome (500); Montgomery, AL
February 10, 2025; 7:00 p.m.		at Alabama A&M	W 72–61	8–16 (5–6)	17 – Dozier	9 – Burnett	7 – Stevenson	Alabama A&M Events Center (1,329); Huntsville, AL
February 15, 2025; 4:30 p.m.		Texas Southern	L 60–67	8–17 (5–7)	15 – Burnett	9 – Dozier	2 – 2 tied	Fredrick C. Hobdy Assembly Center (1,754); Grambling, LA
February 17, 2025; 4:30 p.m.		Prairie View A&M	W 70–48	9–17 (6–7)	17 – Eason	10 – Eason	2 – 4 tied	Fredrick C. Hobdy Assembly Center (2,003); Grambling, LA
February 22, 2025; 4:30 p.m.		Southern	L 64–71	9–18 (6–8)	14 – Dozier	6 – 2 tied	4 – Stevenson	Fredrick C. Hobdy Assembly Center (3,205); Grambling, LA
March 1, 2025; 5:30 p.m.		at Florida A&M	L 68–73	9–19 (6–9)	13 – Dozier	5 – Edwards	4 – Edwards	Al Lawson Center; Tallahassee, FL
March 3, 2025; 7:00 p.m.		at Bethune–Cookman	L 71–78	9–20 (6–10)	24 – Flippin	11 – Flippin	3 – 2 tied	Moore Gymnasium (679); Daytona Beach, FL
March 6, 2025; 4:30 p.m.		Alabama A&M	W 67–51	10–20 (7–10)	18 – Flippin	7 – Eason	3 – 2 tied	Fredrick C. Hobdy Assembly Center (532); Grambling, LA
March 8, 2025; 4:30 p.m.		Alabama State	L 47–59	10–21 (7–11)	19 – Flippin	11 – Eason	4 – Stevenson	Fredrick C. Hobdy Assembly Center (1,102); Grambling, LA
SWAC tournament
March 11, 2025; 2:00 p.m., ESPN+	(8)	vs. (9) Alabama A&M; First round	W 73–56	11–21	17 – Stevenson	7 – 3 tied	6 – Dozier	Gateway Center Arena (450); College Park, GA
March 12, 2025; 1:00 p.m., ESPN+	(8)	vs. (1) Southern; Quarterfinals	W 65–62 ^{OT}	12–21	17 – Stevenson	7 – Eason	5 – Dozier	Gateway Center Arena (801); College Park, GA
March 14, 2025; 1:00 p.m., ESPN+	(8)	vs. (5) Alabama State; Semifinals	L 62–64	12–22	20 – Dozier	9 – Stevenson	6 – Stevenson	Gateway Center Arena (849); College Park, GA
*Non-conference game. ^{#}Rankings from AP poll. (#) Tournament seedings in parentheses. All times are in Central.
