= 2024–25 Alabama State Hornets basketball team =

American college basketball season

2024–25 Alabama State Hornets basketball
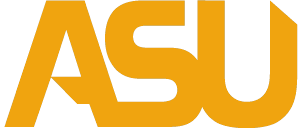

SWAC tournament champions

NCAA tournament, First Round
- Conference: Southwestern Athletic Conference
- Record: 20–16 (12–6 SWAC)
- Head coach: Tony Madlock (3rd season)
- Assistant coaches: Tyrone Levett; Mardracus Wade; Sidney Ball
- Home arena: Dunn–Oliver Acadome

2024–25 SWAC men's basketball standings
	Conf.				Overall
Team	W		L	PCT	W		L	PCT
Southern	15	–	3	.833	20	–	12	.625
Jackson State	14	–	4	.778	16	–	18	.471
Bethune–Cookman	13	–	5	.722	17	–	16	.515
Texas Southern	12	–	6	.667	15	–	17	.469
Alabama State †	12	–	6	.667	20	–	16	.556
Alcorn State	11	–	7	.611	11	–	21	.344
Florida A&M	10	–	8	.556	14	–	17	.452
Grambling State	7	–	11	.389	12	–	22	.353
Alabama A&M	6	–	12	.333	10	–	22	.313
Prairie View A&M	4	–	14	.222	5	–	27	.156
Arkansas–Pine Bluff	3	–	15	.167	6	–	25	.194
Mississippi Valley State	1	–	17	.056	3	–	28	.097
† 2025 SWAC tournament winner

The 2024–25 Alabama State Hornets basketball team represented Alabama State University during the 2024–25 NCAA Division I men's basketball season. The Hornets, led by third-year head coach Tony Madlock, played their home games at the Dunn–Oliver Acadome in Montgomery, Alabama as members of the Southwestern Athletic Conference (SWAC).

== Previous season ==
The Hornets finished the 2023–24 season 13–19, 8–10 in SWAC play, to finish in a tie for eighth place. They were defeated by top-seeded and eventual tournament champions Grambling State in the quarterfinals of the SWAC tournament.

== Roster ==
2024–25 Alabama State Hornets men's basketball team
Players
Coaches

Pos.	#	Name	Height	Weight	Year	Previous school	Hometown
F	0	D'Ante Bass	6 ft 6 in (1.98 m)	205 lb (93 kg)	Jr	Georgetown	Savannah, GA
G	1	Amarr Knox	6 ft 3 in (1.91 m)	170 lb (77 kg)	RS So	Bartlett HS	Memphis, TN
G	2	Micah Simpson	6 ft 2 in (1.88 m)	190 lb (86 kg)	Jr	Walters State CC	Morristown, TN
G	3	CJ Hines	6 ft 2 in (1.88 m)	185 lb (84 kg)	Sr	Faulkner	Atlanta, GA
C	4	Mario Andrews	6 ft 7 in (2.01 m)	200 lb (91 kg)	Jr	Snead State CC	Independence, LA
G	5	Tyler Mack	6 ft 5 in (1.96 m)	185 lb (84 kg)	Sr	Maryland Eastern Shore	Warren, MI
G	10	Jalen Keago	6 ft 6 in (1.98 m)	210 lb (95 kg)	Jr	Pensacola State College	Oshkosh, WI
G	11	Micah Octave	6 ft 5 in (1.96 m)	185 lb (84 kg)	Sr	Indian River State College	Boca Raton, FL
G	12	Shawn Fulcher	6 ft 0 in (1.83 m)	170 lb (77 kg)	Jr	Buffalo	Brooklyn, NY
G	13	Jordon Marshall	6 ft 2 in (1.88 m)	200 lb (91 kg)	Jr	Southern Union State CC	Covington, GA
G	20	TJ Madlock	6 ft 3 in (1.91 m)	190 lb (86 kg)	Sr	South Carolina State	Memphis, TN
F	22	Kevin Alabi	6 ft 9 in (2.06 m)	210 lb (95 kg)	Fr	Skyline Prep	Brampton, ON
F	24	Jerquarius Stanback	6 ft 10 in (2.08 m)	190 lb (86 kg)	Fr	Asheboro HS	Asheboro, NC
F	25	Jasteven Walker	6 ft 10 in (2.08 m)	190 lb (86 kg)	RS So	Fayette Ware HS	Oakland, TN
C	35	Ubong Okon	7 ft 1 in (2.16 m)	230 lb (104 kg)	Sr	Georgia Highlands College	Akwa Ibom, Nigeria

Head coach

- Tony Madlock (Memphis)

Assistant coach(es)

- Tyrone Levett (Alabama State)
- Mardracus Wade (Arkansas)
- Sidney Ball (UAB)

Legend

- (C) Team captain
- (S) Suspended
- (I) Ineligible
- (W) Walk-on
- Injured
- Current redshirt

Roster
Last update: November 30, 2024

== Schedule and results ==
Date time, TV	Rank^{#}	Opponent^{#}	Result	Record	High points	High rebounds	High assists	Site (attendance) city, state
Exhibition
October 28, 2024*; 6:00 p.m.		John Melvin Christian	W 113–48	–	19 – Fulcher	9 – Bass	9 – Fulcher	Dunn–Oliver Acadome (512); Montgomery, AL
Non-conference regular season
November 9, 2024*; 10:30 p.m., MW Network		at UNLV	L 79–93	0–1	19 – Knox	6 – Bass	5 – tied	Thomas & Mack Center (4,608); Paradise, NV
November 10, 2024*; 4:00 p.m., SECN+/ESPN+		at LSU	L 61–74	0–2	21 – Madlock	10 – Andrews	2 – Knox	Pete Maravich Assembly Center (7,247); Baton Rouge, LA
November 18, 2024*; 6:00 p.m.		Virginia Lynchburg	W 115–64	1–2	21 – Hines	11 – Andrews	7 – Fulcher	Dunn–Oliver Acadome (504); Montgomery, AL
November 22, 2024*; 7:30 p.m.		vs. Omaha; Akron Basketball Classic	W 85–67	2–2	19 – Knox	8 – Bass	7 – Madlock	James A. Rhodes Arena; Akron, OH
November 23, 2024*; 5:30 p.m.		vs. Lamar; Akron Basketball Classic	W 77–75	3–2	24 – Hines	9 – Madlock	2 – tied	James A. Rhodes Arena (120); Akron, OH
November 24, 2024*; 2:00 p.m., ESPN+		at Akron; Akron Basketball Classic	L 78–97	3–3	19 – Hines	5 – Madlock	4 – Knox	James A. Rhodes Arena (1,589); Akron, OH
November 27, 2024*; 6:00 p.m., ESPN+		at No. 16 Cincinnati	L 59–77	3–4	24 – Knox	6 – Okon	5 – Madlock	Fifth Third Arena (10,970); Cincinnati, OH
December 3, 2024*; 7:00 p.m., ACCNX/ESPN+		at SMU	L 72–101	3–5	17 – Knox	6 – tied	3 – Hines	Moody Coliseum (5,025); University Park, TX
December 5, 2024*; 2:30 p.m., ESPN+		at Southern Miss	L 64–81	3–6	18 – Hines	9 – Walker	3 – Knox	Reed Green Coliseum (2,888); Hattiesburg, MS
December 11, 2024*; 6:00 p.m.		UT Martin	W 103–93 ^{OT}	4–6	23 – Knox	8 – Octave	11 – Hines	Dunn–Oliver Acadome (550); Montgomery, AL
December 19, 2024*; 11:00 a.m., ESPNU		vs. Norfolk State; Chris Paul HBCU Challenge	L 54–71	4–7	17 – Madlock	6 – Okon	4 – Knox	Mohegan Sun Arena; Uncasville, CT
December 20, 2024*; 12:30 p.m., ESPNU		vs. Delaware State; Chris Paul HBCU Challenge	L 80–83	4–8	25 – Hines	6 – tied	3 – tied	Mohegan Sun Arena; Uncasville, CT
December 30, 2024*; 6:30 p.m., SECN+/ESPN+		at Missouri	L 65–82	4–9	14 – Bass	7 – tied	4 – Fulcher	Mizzou Arena (9,981); Columbia, MO
SWAC regular season
January 4, 2025; 3:00 p.m.		Mississippi Valley State	W 84–55	5–9 (1–0)	14 – tied	9 – Octave	6 – Hines	Dunn–Oliver Acadome (2,152); Montgomery, AL
January 6, 2025; 6:00 p.m.		Arkansas–Pine Bluff	W 93–91	6–9 (2–0)	23 – Hines	6 – tied	5 – Simpson	Dunn–Oliver Acadome (475); Montgomery, AL
January 11, 2025; 3:00 p.m.		at Jackson State	L 70–77	6–10 (2–1)	24 – Knox	10 – Octave	4 – Knox	Williams Assembly Center (1,008); Jackson, MS
January 13, 2025; 6:00 p.m.		at Alcorn State	L 65–67	6–11 (2–2)	13 – Hines	6 – Bass	4 – Knox	Davey Whitney Complex (305); Lorman, MS
January 18, 2025; 4:00 p.m.		at Alabama A&M	W 69–65	7–11 (3–2)	14 – tied	10 – Madlock	5 – Fulcher	AAMU Events Center (6,569); Huntsville, AL
January 25, 2025; 3:00 p.m.		Prairie View A&M	W 66–63	8–11 (4–2)	14 – tied	13 – Madlock	3 – Madlock	Dunn–Oliver Acadome (1,125); Montgomery, AL
January 27, 2025; 6:00 p.m.		Texas Southern	L 69–80	8–12 (4–3)	18 – Madlock	13 – Madlock	5 – Madlock	Dunn–Oliver Acadome (1,129); Montgomery, AL
February 1, 2025; 4:30 p.m.		at Bethune–Cookman	L 64–67	8–13 (4–4)	19 – Hines	7 – Madlock	4 – Madlock	Moore Gymnasium (990); Daytona Beach, FL
February 3, 2025; 6:00 p.m.		at Florida A&M	W 67–66	9–13 (5–4)	32 – Knox	11 – Madlock	2 – Hines	Al Lawson Center (750); Tallahassee, FL
February 8, 2025; 3:00 p.m.		Grambling State	L 67–77	9–14 (5–5)	17 – Knox	7 – Walker	4 – tied	Dunn–Oliver Acadome (500); Montgomery, AL
February 10, 2025; 6:00 p.m.		Southern	W 82–81	10–14 (6–5)	26 – Knox	10 – Octave	6 – tied	Dunn–Oliver Acadome (1,255); Montgomery, AL
February 15, 2025; 5:30 p.m.		at Arkansas–Pine Bluff	W 75–63	11–14 (7–5)	20 – Madlock	9 – tied	5 – Hines	H.O. Clemmons Arena (1,475); Pine Bluff, AR
February 17, 2025; 6:00 p.m.		at Mississippi Valley State	W 79–56	12–14 (8–5)	13 – Tied	9 – Octave	5 – Fulcher	Harrison HPER Complex (1,001); Itta Bena, MS
February 22, 2025; 3:00 p.m.		Florida A&M	W 60–59	13–14 (9–5)	17 – Knox	9 – Octave	2 – Madlock	Dunn–Oliver Acadome (437); Montgomery, AL
February 24, 2025; 6:00 p.m.		Bethune–Cookman	L 68–70	13–15 (9–6)	23 – Madlock	8 – Madlock	4 – Hines	Dunn–Oliver Acadome (801); Montgomery, AL
March 1, 2025; 3:00 p.m.		Alabama A&M	W 94–52	14–15 (10–6)	22 – Knox	6 – Tied	5 – Knox	Dunn–Oliver Acadome (1,916); Montgomery, AL
March 6, 2025; 8:00 p.m.		at Southern	W 66–65	15–15 (11–6)	24 – Madlock	9 – Madlock	7 – Knox	F. G. Clark Center (4,689); Baton Rouge, LA
March 8, 2025; 4:30 p.m.		at Grambling State	W 59–47	16–15 (12–6)	16 – Madlock	10 – Madlock	2 – Knox	Fredrick C. Hobdy Assembly Center (1,102); Grambling, LA
SWAC tournament
March 13, 2025; 2:00 p.m., ESPN+	(5)	vs. (4) Texas Southern; Quarterfinals	W 84–79	17–15	16 – Bass	8 – Tied	6 – Madlock	Gateway Center Arena (1,027); College Park, GA
March 14, 2025; 2:00 p.m., ESPN+	(5)	vs. (8) Grambling State; Semifinals	W 64–62	18–15	15 – Hines	10 – Madlock	5 – Hines	Gateway Center Arena (849); College Park, GA
March 15, 2025; 8:30 p.m., ESPNU	(5)	vs. (2) Jackson State; Championship	W 60–56	19–15	20 – Hines	12 – Madlock	3 – Tied	Gateway Center Arena (3,154); College Park, GA
NCAA tournament
March 18, 2025*; 5:40 p.m., TruTV	(16 S)	vs. (16 S) Saint Francis; First Four	W 70–68	20–15	16 – Knox	7 – Tied	3 – Tied	UD Arena; Dayton, OH
March 20, 2025*; 1:50 p.m., CBS	(16 S)	vs. (1 S) No. 4 Auburn; First Round	L 63–83	20–16	18 – Knox	9 – Bass	2 – Bass	Rupp Arena (18,769); Lexington, KY
*Non-conference game. ^{#}Rankings from AP poll. (#) Tournament seedings in parentheses. S=South. All times are in Central.
