= 2024–25 Texas Southern Tigers basketball team =

American college basketball season

2024–25 Texas Southern Tigers basketball
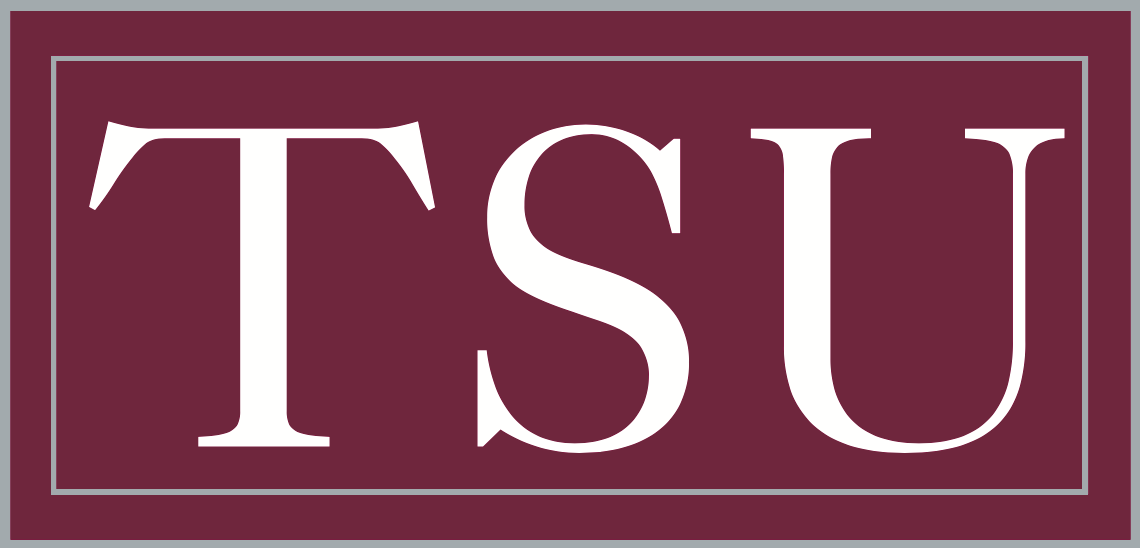
- Conference: Southwestern Athletic Conference
- Record: 15–17 (12–6 SWAC)
- Head coach: Johnny Jones (7th season)
- Assistant coaches: Shyrone Chatman; Josh White; Charlie Hurd; John Jones
- Home arena: Health and Physical Education Arena

2024–25 SWAC men's basketball standings
	Conf.				Overall
Team	W		L	PCT	W		L	PCT
Southern	15	–	3	.833	20	–	12	.625
Jackson State	14	–	4	.778	16	–	18	.471
Bethune–Cookman	13	–	5	.722	17	–	16	.515
Texas Southern	12	–	6	.667	15	–	17	.469
Alabama State †	12	–	6	.667	20	–	16	.556
Alcorn State	11	–	7	.611	11	–	21	.344
Florida A&M	10	–	8	.556	14	–	17	.452
Grambling State	7	–	11	.389	12	–	22	.353
Alabama A&M	6	–	12	.333	10	–	22	.313
Prairie View A&M	4	–	14	.222	5	–	27	.156
Arkansas–Pine Bluff	3	–	15	.167	6	–	25	.194
Mississippi Valley State	1	–	17	.056	3	–	28	.097
† 2025 SWAC tournament winner

The 2024–25 Texas Southern Tigers basketball team represented Texas Southern University during the 2024–25 NCAA Division I men's basketball season. The Tigers, led by seventh-year head coach Johnny Jones, played their home games at the Health and Physical Education Arena located in Houston, Texas, as members of the Southwestern Athletic Conference.

== Previous season ==
The Tigers finished the 2023–24 season 16–17, 12–6 in SWAC play to finish in a tie for third place. As the No. 3 seed in the SWAC Tournament, they defeated Jackson State in the quarterfinals, and Alabama A&M in the semifinals, before losing to Grambling State in the championship. They received an invitation to the CIT, where they lost to Tarleton in the first round.

== Roster ==
2024–25 Texas Southern Tigers men's basketball team
Players
Coaches

Pos.	#	Name	Height	Weight	Year	Hometown
G	0	Jaylin Jackson-Posey	6 ft 3 in (1.91 m)	197 lb (89 kg)	So	Midland, Texas
F	1	Kenny Hunter	6 ft 8 in (2.03 m)	236 lb (107 kg)	RS Sr	Shreveport, Louisiana
G	2	Kavion McClain	5 ft 10 in (1.78 m)	160 lb (73 kg)	Sr	Memphis, Tennessee
F	3	Omar Koureissi	6 ft 11 in (2.11 m)	220 lb (100 kg)	Sr	Harlem, New York
F	4	Josh Farmer	6 ft 10 in (2.08 m)	200 lb (91 kg)	Jr	Houston, Texas
G	5	Jaylen Wysinger	6 ft 0 in (1.83 m)	170 lb (77 kg)	Sr	Houston, Texas
G	6	Bryce Roberts	6 ft 1 in (1.85 m)	180 lb (82 kg)	Sr	Bossier City, Louisiana
G	7	Zaire Hayes	6 ft 2 in (1.88 m)	185 lb (84 kg)	Sr	Houston, Texas
G	8	Alex Anderson	6 ft 6 in (1.98 m)	200 lb (91 kg)	Jr	Memphis, Tennessee
G	12	Zytarious Mortle	6 ft 2 in (1.88 m)	199 lb (90 kg)	Jr	Alexandria, Louisiana
G	14	Kolby Granger	6 ft 5 in (1.96 m)	195 lb (88 kg)	RS Jr	Missouri City, Texas
G	23	Duane Posey	6 ft 7 in (2.01 m)	215 lb (98 kg)	GS	Memphis, Tennessee
F	25	Grayson Carter	6 ft 10 in (2.08 m)	240 lb (109 kg)	GS	Dallas, Texas
G	30	Mario Davis	6 ft 5 in (1.96 m)	180 lb (82 kg)	GS	Houston, Texas
G	32	Kehlin Farooq	6 ft 6 in (1.98 m)	196 lb (89 kg)	RS Jr	Houston, Texas
G	42	Leonard Wilson	6 ft 3 in (1.91 m)	195 lb (88 kg)	Sr	Pearland, Texas

Head coach

- Johnny Jones (LSU)

Assistant coach(es)

- Shyrone Chatman (Memphis)
- Josh White (North Texas)
- Charlie Hurd (Texas A&M–Corpus Christi)
- John Jones (Texas Southern)

Legend

- (C) Team captain
- (S) Suspended
- (I) Ineligible
- (W) Walk-on
- Injured
- Current redshirt

Roster
Last update: November 7, 2024

== Schedule and results ==
Date time, TV	Rank^{#}	Opponent^{#}	Result	Record	High points	High rebounds	High assists	Site (attendance) city, state
Non-conference regular season
November 4, 2024*; 6:30 pm, FS1		at Xavier	L 69–78	0–1	21 – McClain	6 – Hunter	3 – 2 Tied	Cintas Center (10,212); Cincinnati, OH
November 6, 2024*; 6:00 pm		Texas A&M–San Antonio	W 100–66	1–1	22 – McClain	8 – Granger	8 – McClain	H&PE Arena (884); Houston, TX
November 10, 2024*; 2:30 pm, SECN+/ESPN+		at Georgia	L 64–92	1–2	16 – Hunter	3 – 3 Tied	4 – McClain	Stegeman Coliseum (5,405); Athens, GA
November 12, 2024*; 6:30 pm, ACCNX/ESPN+		at Georgia Tech	L 62–81	1–3	15 – Posey	9 – Hunter	5 – McClain	McCamish Pavilion (3,384); Atlanta, GA
November 17, 2024*; 2:00 pm, ESPN+		at Samford	L 82–97	1–4	26 – Posey	12 – Posey	9 – McClain	Pete Hanna Center (1,062); Homewood, AL
November 24, 2024*; 7:00 pm, MW Network		at New Mexico	L 68–99	1–5	15 – McClain	7 – Koureissi	6 – McClain	The Pit (11,286); Albuquerque, NM
November 27, 2024*; 1:00 pm		Texas A&M–Kingsville	W 80–72	2–5	14 – McClain	9 – Hunter	6 – McClain	H&PE Arena (787); Houston, TX
December 1, 2024*; 4:00 pm		Texas State	L 59–72	2–6	12 – McClain	6 – 2 Tied	3 – Anderson	H&PE Arena (385); Houston, TX
December 7, 2024*; 4:30 pm, ESPN+		at Sam Houston	L 71–87	2–7	19 – McClain	4 – 3 Tied	5 – McClain	Bernard Johnson Coliseum (454); Huntsville, TX
December 14, 2024*; 9:00 pm, MW Network		at Nevada	L 73–105	2–8	16 – Hayes	7 – Hunter	6 – Anderson	Lawlor Events Center (7,512); Reno, NV
December 17, 2024*; 8:00 pm, MW Network		at Boise State	L 51–82	2–9	15 – McClain	6 – Hunter	3 – Anderson	ExtraMile Arena (9,968); Boise, ID
December 21, 2024*; 3:00 pm, ESPN+		at Abilene Christian	L 65–69	2–10	19 – McClain	10 – Granger	3 – 2 Tied	Moody Coliseum (1,191); Abilene, TX
December 28, 2024*; 6:00 pm		Biblical Studies	W 103–68	3–10	16 – Posey	9 – Posey	5 – McClain	H&PE Arena (447); Houston, TX
SWAC regular season
January 4, 2025; 5:30 pm		Southern	L 58–67	3–11 (0–1)	19 – Hayes	7 – Hunter	2 – 2 Tied	H&PE Arena (2,079); Houston, TX
January 6, 2025; 8:00 pm, ESPNU		Grambling State	W 71–66 ^{OT}	4–11 (1–1)	24 – Hayes	9 – Jackson-Posey	5 – 2 Tied	H&PE Arena (1,893); Houston, TX
January 13, 2025; 6:00 pm		at Mississippi Valley State	W 82–53	5–11 (2–1)	14 – McClain	9 – Hunter	4 – 2 Tied	Harrison HPER Complex (1,574); Itta Bena, MS
January 18, 2025; 5:00 pm		Alcorn State	W 66–57	6–11 (3–1)	16 – Hayes	6 – Hunter	4 – Wysinger	H&PE Arena (1,489); Houston, TX
January 20, 2025; 7:00 pm		Jackson State	W 81–73	7–11 (4–1)	20 – McClain	7 – 2 Tied	4 – Jackson-Posey	H&PE Arena (1,058); Houston, TX
January 25, 2025; 4:00 pm		at Alabama A&M	W 82–78	8–11 (5–1)	24 – McClain	11 – Posey	7 – McClain	Alabama A&M Events Center (1,311); Huntsville, AL
January 27, 2025; 6:00 pm		at Alabama State	W 80–69	9–11 (6–1)	23 – Wysinger	9 – Wysinger	4 – 2 Tied	Dunn–Oliver Acadome (1,129); Montgomery, AL
February 1, 2025; 5:00 pm		Prairie View A&M	W 79–63	10–11 (7–1)	23 – McClain	8 – Granger	4 – McClain	H&PE Arena (7,528); Houston, TX
February 4, 2025; 5:30 pm		at Arkansas–Pine Bluff	L 68–69	10–12 (7–2)	19 – McClain	15 – Hunter	4 – Jackson-Posey	H.O. Clemmons Arena (1,364); Pine Bluff, AR
February 8, 2025; 5:00 pm		Florida A&M	L 64–66	10–13 (7–3)	14 – 2 Tied	5 – 3 Tied	7 – McClain	H&PE Arena (5,263); Houston, TX
February 10, 2025; 7:00 pm		Bethune–Cookman	L 77–80	10–14 (7–4)	19 – McClain	11 – Farooq	7 – McClain	H&PE Arena (1,487); Houston, TX
February 15, 2025; 6:30 pm		at Grambling State	W 67–60	11–14 (8–4)	13 – 2 Tied	10 – Granger	6 – McClain	Fredrick C. Hobdy Assembly Center (1,754); Grambling, LA
February 17, 2025; 8:00 pm, ESPNU		at Southern	L 57–66	11–15 (8–5)	16 – Granger	7 – 2 Tied	4 – Granger	F. G. Clark Center (5,679); Baton Rouge, LA
February 22, 2025; 5:00 pm		Mississippi Valley State	W 79–38	12–15 (9–5)	17 – Carter	9 – Farooq	6 – Hayes	H&PE Arena (1,224); Houston, TX
February 24, 2025; 7:00 pm		Arkansas–Pine Bluff	W 81–56	13–15 (10–5)	21 – Granger	11 – Granger	4 – Farooq	H&PE Arena (1,489); Houston, TX
March 1, 2025; 3:00 pm		at Jackson State	L 52–67	13–16 (10–6)	10 – Farooq	8 – Carter	2 – 2 Tied	Williams Assembly Center (1,312); Jackson, MS
March 3, 2025; 6:00 pm		at Alcorn State	W 75–59	14–16 (11–6)	20 – Hayes	9 – Carter	4 – 3 Tied	Davey Whitney Complex (458); Lorman, MS
March 8, 2025; 4:30 pm		at Prairie View A&M	W 80–68	15–16 (12–6)	15 – Farmer	10 – Farmer	4 – Granger	William Nicks Building (1,909); Prairie View, TX
SWAC tournament
March 13, 2025; 2:00 pm, ESPN+	(4)	vs. (5) Alabama State; Quarterfinals	L 79–84	15–17	24 – Hayes	8 – Carter	6 – McClain	Gateway Center Arena (1,027); College Park, GA
*Non-conference game. ^{#}Rankings from AP Poll. (#) Tournament seedings in parentheses. All times are in Central.
