= 2024–25 Prairie View A&M Panthers basketball team =

American college basketball season

2024–25 Prairie View A&M Panthers basketball
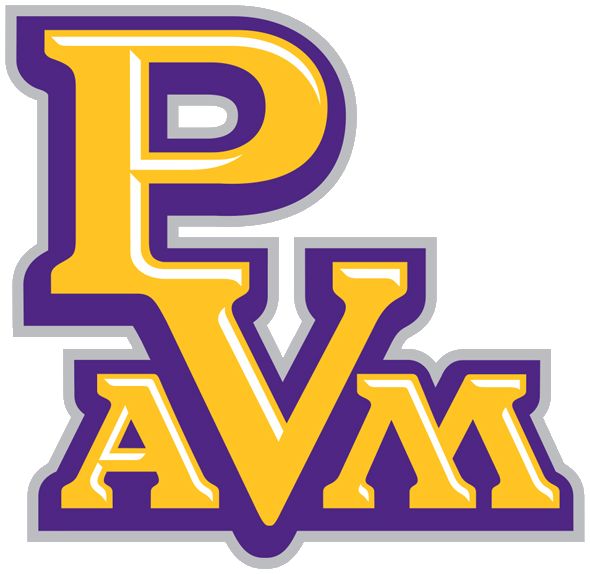
- Conference: Southwestern Athletic Conference
- Record: 5–27 (4–14 SWAC)
- Head coach: Byron Smith (9th season)
- Assistant coaches: Spencer Robertson; Todd Shelton; Keith Berard; Grant Mikita
- Home arena: William Nicks Building

2024–25 SWAC men's basketball standings
	Conf.				Overall
Team	W		L	PCT	W		L	PCT
Southern	15	–	3	.833	20	–	12	.625
Jackson State	14	–	4	.778	16	–	18	.471
Bethune–Cookman	13	–	5	.722	17	–	16	.515
Texas Southern	12	–	6	.667	15	–	17	.469
Alabama State †	12	–	6	.667	20	–	16	.556
Alcorn State	11	–	7	.611	11	–	21	.344
Florida A&M	10	–	8	.556	14	–	17	.452
Grambling State	7	–	11	.389	12	–	22	.353
Alabama A&M	6	–	12	.333	10	–	22	.313
Prairie View A&M	4	–	14	.222	5	–	27	.156
Arkansas–Pine Bluff	3	–	15	.167	6	–	25	.194
Mississippi Valley State	1	–	17	.056	3	–	28	.097
† 2025 SWAC tournament winner

The 2024–25 Prairie View A&M Panthers basketball team represented Prairie View A&M University during the 2024–25 NCAA Division I men's basketball season. The Panthers, led by ninth-year head coach Byron Smith, played their home games at the William Nicks Building in Prairie View, Texas as members of the Southwestern Athletic Conference (SWAC).

== Previous season ==
The Panthers finished the 2023–24 season 10–21, 5–13 in SWAC play, to finish in tenth place. They failed to qualify for the SWAC tournament, as only the top eight teams qualify.

== Roster ==
2024–25 Prairie View A&M Panthers men's basketball team
Players
Coaches

Pos.	#	Name	Height	Weight	Year	Previous school	Hometown
F	0	Evan Williams	6 ft 7 in (2.01 m)	240 lb (109 kg)	GS	Cornell	Plano, TX
G	1	Jordan Tillmon	6 ft 3 in (1.91 m)	185 lb (84 kg)	GS	Watson Chapel High School	Pine Bluff, AR
G	3	John-Paul Ricks	6 ft 1 in (1.85 m)	168 lb (76 kg)	Jr	Hutchinson Community College	Baton Rouge, LA
PG	4	Braelon Bush	5 ft 9 in (1.75 m)	160 lb (73 kg)	GS	Silsbee High School	Silsbee, TX
PG	5	Isaiah Foster	6 ft 1 in (1.85 m)	170 lb (77 kg)	Jr	Quincy	Frisco, TX
G	6	Zaakir Sawyer	6 ft 5 in (1.96 m)	220 lb (100 kg)	GS	Tarleton State	Dallas, TX
SG	7	Solomon Oraegbu	6 ft 3 in (1.91 m)	200 lb (91 kg)	GS	Emporia State	Chicago, IL
G	8	Chauncey Gibson	6 ft 7 in (2.01 m)	206 lb (93 kg)	So	Clemson	Oak Cliff, TX
G	10	Jonathan Nash	6 ft 2 in (1.88 m)	170 lb (77 kg)	Sr	Tompkins High School	Katy, TX
PG	11	Tanahj Pettway	6 ft 2 in (1.88 m)	180 lb (82 kg)	GS	New Mexico State	Worcester, MA
PG	12	Orlando Jr. Horton	5 ft 11 in (1.8 m)	152 lb (69 kg)	So	Clear Falls High School	Houston, TX
G/F	13	Elijah Terry	6 ft 7 in (2.01 m)	205 lb (93 kg)	Jr	Enterprise High School	Enterprise, AL
G	22	Malachi McReed	6 ft 6 in (1.98 m)	220 lb (100 kg)	GS	Bedford	Orlando, FL
G/F	23	Nick Anderson	6 ft 5 in (1.96 m)	195 lb (88 kg)	Jr	St. Thomas (TX)	Houston, TX
F	24	Marcel Bryant	6 ft 7 in (2.01 m)	235 lb (107 kg)	So	Cedar Ridge High School	Austin, TX
G	30	Keddric Mays	6 ft 2 in (1.88 m)	180 lb (82 kg)	Jr	Angelina College	Cypress, TX
F	34	Ryan Jr. Bolton	6 ft 11 in (2.11 m)	232 lb (105 kg)	So	Texas State	Pensacola, FL

Head coach

- Byron Smith (Houston)

Assistant coach(es)

- Spencer Robertson (Wichita State)
- Todd Shelton (Texas Wesleyan)
- Keith Berard (Southern Utah)
- Grant Mikita (North Texas)

Legend

- (C) Team captain
- (S) Suspended
- (I) Ineligible
- (W) Walk-on
- Injured
- Current redshirt

Roster
Last update: December 2, 2024

== Schedule and results ==
Date time, TV	Rank^{#}	Opponent^{#}	Result	Record	High points	High rebounds	High assists	Site (attendance) city, state
Exhibition
October 13, 2024*; 5:00 p.m.		vs. Sam Houston; Charity Exhibition Game	L 87–94	–	–	–	–	Delmar Fieldhouse; Houston, TX
Non-conference regular season
November 4, 2024*; 6:00 p.m.		Biblical Studies	W 111–90	1–0	28 – Horton Jr.	9 – Bryant	6 – tied	William Nicks Building (832); Prairie View, TX
November 7, 2024*; 7:00 p.m., FS1		at DePaul	L 59–92	1–1	20 – Anderson	7 – Anderson	3 – Tillmon	Wintrust Arena (2,725); Chicago, IL
November 12, 2024*; 7:00 p.m., ESPN+		at Incarnate Word	L 81–84	1–2	24 – Gibson	5 – Bryant	4 – Horton Jr.	McDermott Center (236); San Antonio, TX
November 18, 2024*; 7:00 p.m., ACCNX/ESPN+		at SMU; Acrisure Holiday Invitational campus game	L 69–110	1–3	20 – Pettway	7 – Anderson	6 – Horton Jr.	Moody Coliseum (5,056); University Park, TX
November 20, 2024*; 9:00 p.m., MW Network		at Fresno State; Acrisure Holiday Invitational campus game	L 83–94	1–4	18 – Tillmon	9 – Tillmon	3 – Ricks	Save Mart Center (4,615); Fresno, CA
November 23, 2024*; 7:00 p.m., ESPN+		at Northern Colorado; Acrisure Holiday Invitational campus game	L 98–114	1–5	32 – Anderson	6 – Bryant	2 – tied	Bank of Colorado Arena (1,102); Greeley, CO
November 30, 2024*; 3:30 p.m., ESPN+		at Texas A&M–Corpus Christi	L 74–109	1–6	21 – Pettway	10 – Bryant	3 – Anderson	American Bank Center (1,155); Corpus Christi, TX
December 6, 2024*; 6:30 p.m., ESPN+		at UAB	L 66–95	1–7	15 – Anderson	8 – Anderson	3 – Anderson	Bartow Arena (3,153); Birmingham, AL
December 8, 2024*; 3:00 p.m., SECN+/ESPN+		at Mississippi State	L 84–91	1–8	21 – Anderson	7 – Bryant	4 – tied	Humphrey Coliseum (7,111); Starkville, MS
December 14, 2024*; 8:00 p.m., ESPN+		at Loyola Marymount	L 75–76	1–9	20 – Anderson	5 – Pettway	5 – Pettway	Gersten Pavilion (769); Los Angeles, CA
December 17, 2024*; 8:30 p.m., BTN		at No. 18 UCLA	L 75–111	1–10	24 – Tillmon	8 – Anderson	5 – Bush	Pauley Pavilion (5,017); Los Angeles, CA
December 22, 2024*; 7:00 p.m., ESPN+		at Rice	L 46–64	1–11	18 – Anderson	10 – Anderson	2 – tied	Tudor Fieldhouse (1,735); Houston, TX
December 29, 2024*; 1:00 p.m., SECN+/ESPN+		at No. 12 Oklahoma	L 67–89	1–12	22 – Pettway	8 – Terry	3 – Bush	Lloyd Noble Center (6,876); Norman, OK
SWAC regular season
January 4, 2025; 4:30 p.m.		Grambling State	W 73–55	2–12 (1–0)	23 – Pettway	4 – tied	7 – Horton Jr.	William Nicks Building (426); Prairie View, TX
January 6, 2025; 7:30 p.m.		Southern	L 80–84	2–13 (1–1)	21 – Pettway	5 – tied	4 – Horton Jr.	William Nicks Building (253); Prairie View, TX
January 11, 2025; 4:30 p.m.		at Mississippi Valley State	W 74–65	3–13 (2–1)	22 – Pettway	7 – tied	3 – tied	Harrison HPER Complex (1,178); Itta Bena, MS
January 13, 2025; 5:30 p.m.		at Arkansas–Pine Bluff	W 75–64	4–13 (3–1)	33 – Pettway	11 – tied	4 – Tillmon	H.O. Clemmons Arena (2,175); Pine Bluff, AR
January 18, 2025; 4:30 p.m.		Jackson State	L 70–79	4–14 (3–2)	31 – Pettway	8 – Bryant	5 – Bush	William Nicks Building (455); Prairie View, TX
January 20, 2025; 7:30 p.m.		Alcorn State	L 70–78	4–15 (3–3)	26 – Tillmon	5 – Bryant	6 – Bush	William Nicks Building (411); Prairie View, TX
January 25, 2025; 3:00 p.m.		at Alabama State	L 63–66	4–16 (3–4)	25 – Bush	9 – tied	2 – Bryant	Dunn–Oliver Acadome (1,125); Montgomery, AL
January 27, 2025; 7:00 p.m.		at Alabama A&M	L 82–98	4–17 (3–5)	28 – Bush	7 – tied	5 – Pettway	AAMU Event Center (1,239); Huntsville, AL
February 1, 2025; 5:00 p.m.		at Texas Southern	L 63–79	4–18 (3–6)	23 – Pettway	7 – Pettway	2 – tied	H&PE Arena (7,528); Houston, TX
February 8, 2025; 4:30 p.m.		Bethune–Cookman	L 82–85	4–19 (3–7)	23 – Pettway	6 – Terry	4 – tied	William Nicks Building (466); Prairie View, TX
February 10, 2025; 7:30 p.m.		Florida A&M	L 67–78	4–20 (3–8)	22 – Bush	8 – Terry	7 – Horton Jr.	William Nicks Building (704); Prairie View, TX
February 15, 2025; 4:30 p.m.		at Southern	L 60–72	4–21 (3–9)	19 – Bush	7 – Bolton Jr.	3 – Pettway	F. G. Clark Center (4,689); Baton Rouge, LA
February 17, 2025; 4:30 p.m.		at Grambling State	L 48–70	4–22 (3–10)	20 – Bush	6 – tied	2 – tied	Fredrick C. Hobdy Assembly Center (2,003); Grambling, LA
February 22, 2025; 4:30 p.m.		Arkansas–Pine Bluff	L 64–75	4–23 (3–11)	22 – Tillmon	6 – Tillmon	6 – tied	William Nicks Building (876); Prairie View, TX
February 24, 2025; 7:30 p.m.		Mississippi Valley State	W 64–56	5–23 (4–11)	24 – Bush	7 – Bryant	5 – Bush	William Nicks Building (358); Prairie View, TX
March 1, 2025; 4:30 p.m.		at Alcorn State	L 55–71	5–24 (4–12)	19 – Bush	8 – Bush	4 – Bryant	Davey Whitney Complex (300); Lorman, MS
March 3, 2025; 8:00 p.m., ESPNU/ESPN+		at Jackson State	L 74–88	5–25 (4–13)	25 – Bush	5 – tied	3 – tied	Williams Assembly Center (744); Jackson, MS
March 8, 2025; 4:30 p.m.		Texas Southern	L 68–80	5–26 (4–14)	17 – Tillmon	10 – Bryant	4 – tied	William Nicks Building (1,909); Prairie View, TX
SWAC tournament
March 11, 2025; 8:30 p.m., ESPN+	(10)	vs. (7) Florida A&M; First round	L 66–75	5–27	19 – tied	13 – Bryant	6 – tied	Gateway Center Arena (1,200); College Park, GA
*Non-conference game. ^{#}Rankings from AP poll. (#) Tournament seedings in parentheses. All times are in Central.
