= 2024–25 Mississippi Valley State Delta Devils basketball team =

American college basketball season

2024–25 Mississippi Valley State Delta Devils basketball
- Conference: Southwestern Athletic Conference
- Record: 3–28 (1–17 SWAC)
- Head coach: George Ivory (3rd season)
- Assistant coaches: Kevin Sims; Khalid Campbell; Terrance Chatman
- Home arena: Harrison HPER Complex

2024–25 SWAC men's basketball standings
	Conf.				Overall
Team	W		L	PCT	W		L	PCT
Southern	15	–	3	.833	20	–	12	.625
Jackson State	14	–	4	.778	16	–	18	.471
Bethune–Cookman	13	–	5	.722	17	–	16	.515
Texas Southern	12	–	6	.667	15	–	17	.469
Alabama State †	12	–	6	.667	20	–	16	.556
Alcorn State	11	–	7	.611	11	–	21	.344
Florida A&M	10	–	8	.556	14	–	17	.452
Grambling State	7	–	11	.389	12	–	22	.353
Alabama A&M	6	–	12	.333	10	–	22	.313
Prairie View A&M	4	–	14	.222	5	–	27	.156
Arkansas–Pine Bluff	3	–	15	.167	6	–	25	.194
Mississippi Valley State	1	–	17	.056	3	–	28	.097
† 2025 SWAC tournament winner

The 2024–25 Mississippi Valley State Delta Devils basketball team represented Mississippi Valley State University during the 2024–25 NCAA Division I men's basketball season. The Delta Devils, led by third-year head coach George Ivory, played their home games at the Harrison HPER Complex in Itta Bena, Mississippi as members of the Southwestern Athletic Conference (SWAC).

== Previous season ==
The Delta Devils finished the 2023–24 season 1–30, 1–17 in SWAC play, to finish in last place. They failed to qualify for the SWAC tournament, as only the top eight teams were eligible to participate.

== Roster ==
2024–25 Mississippi Valley State Delta Devils men's basketball team
Players
Coaches

Pos.	#	Name	Height	Weight	Year	Previous school	Hometown
G	0	Arthur Tate	6 ft 6 in (1.98 m)	175 lb (79 kg)	Jr	Coahoma CC	Gluckstadt, MS
G	1	Antonio Sisk	6 ft 1 in (1.85 m)	175 lb (79 kg)	Jr	Dallas College CVC	Dallas, TX
G	3	Donovan Sanders	5 ft 11 in (1.8 m)	170 lb (77 kg)	Sr	Mississippi Gulf Coast CC	Walls, MS
F	5	Walter Hamilton	6 ft 8 in (2.03 m)	220 lb (100 kg)	Sr	Itawamba CC	Potts Camp, MS
G	10	Greg Moore	6 ft 3 in (1.91 m)	160 lb (73 kg)	Jr	Walters State CC	Knoxville, TN
G	11	Markell Petro	6 ft 3 in (1.91 m)	180 lb (82 kg)	Sr	East Mississippi CC	Rosedale, MS
G	12	Kendal Parker	6 ft 4 in (1.93 m)	180 lb (82 kg)	Jr	Alabama State	Montgomery, AL
G	13	Raeshun McGregory	6 ft 4 in (1.93 m)	175 lb (79 kg)	Jr	Coahoma CC	Houston, MS
G	14	George III Ivory	6 ft 2 in (1.88 m)	170 lb (77 kg)	Sr	Arkansas–Pine Bluff	Pine Bluff, AR
F	15	Alvin Stredic	6 ft 8 in (2.03 m)	215 lb (98 kg)	Sr	Arkansas–Pine Bluff	Bay City, TX
F	21	Jair Horton	6 ft 6 in (1.98 m)	210 lb (95 kg)	Jr	Walters State CC	Nashville, TN
F	22	Darrion Salery	6 ft 10 in (2.08 m)	207 lb (94 kg)	Jr	Bishop State CC	Montgomery, AL
C	25	Daniel Umoh	6 ft 9 in (2.06 m)	245 lb (111 kg)	Sr	Solid Rock Academy	Lagos, Nigeria
G	32	Moses Horne	6 ft 2 in (1.88 m)	185 lb (84 kg)	Fr	P. K. Yonge HS	Littleton, CO
C	35	Jonathan Pace	6 ft 9 in (2.06 m)	265 lb (120 kg)	Fr	Gulfport HS	Gulfport, MS
G	44	Jaylon Sanders	6 ft 4 in (1.93 m)	180 lb (82 kg)	Fr	Collierville HS	Memphis, TN

Head coach

- George Ivory (Mississippi Valley State)

Assistant coach(es)

- Kevin Sims (Tulane)
- Khalid Campbell (Arkansas–Pine Bluff)
- Terrance Chatman (UMKC)

Legend

- (C) Team captain
- (S) Suspended
- (I) Ineligible
- (W) Walk-on
- Injured
- Current redshirt

Roster
Last update: December 2, 2024

== Schedule and results ==
Date time, TV	Rank^{#}	Opponent^{#}	Result	Record	High points	High rebounds	High assists	Site (attendance) city, state
Non-conference regular season
November 4, 2024*; 7:00 p.m., ESPN+		at No. 5 Iowa State	L 44–83	0–1	12 – D. Sanders	9 – Stredic	3 – Stredic	Hilton Coliseum (13,616); Ames, IA
November 7, 2024*; 6:00 p.m.		Mississippi University for Women	W 66–49	1–1	14 – Stredic	10 – D. Sanders	6 – D. Sanders	Harrison HPER Complex (562); Itta Bena, MS
November 14, 2024*; 6:30 p.m., SECN+/ESPN+		at Missouri	L 39–111	1–2	10 – Tate	7 – Umoh	2 – D. Sanders	Mizzou Arena (8,889); Columbia, MO
November 16, 2024*; 4:00 p.m., SECN+/ESPN+		at Texas	L 43–89	1–3	11 – Stredic	8 – Stredic	1 – 4 tied	Moody Center (10,457); Austin, TX
November 19, 2024*; 7:00 p.m., ESPN+		at Kansas State	L 56–74	1–4	16 – Tate	6 – Hamilton	4 – Sisk	Bramlage Coliseum (8,416); Manhattan, KS
November 23, 2024*; 8:00 p.m., ESPN+		at BYU	L 43–87	1–5	14 – D. Sanders	6 – Hamilton	3 – 2 tied	Marriott Center (16,954); Provo, UT
November 26, 2024*; 7:00 p.m., ESPN+		at Utah	L 48–94	1–6	23 – Tate	5 – 2 tied	3 – Stredic	Jon M. Huntsman Center (6,604); Salt Lake City, UT
November 29, 2024*; 9:00 p.m., ESPN+		at UC Santa Barbara	L 48–81	1–7	11 – Tate	4 – 2 tied	2 – Sisk	The Thunderdome (1,398); Santa Barbara, CA
December 2, 2024*; 6:00 p.m.		Oakwood	W 91–71	2–7	29 – Stredic	7 – 2 tied	8 – Sanders	Harrison HPER Complex (816); Itta Bena, MS
December 7, 2024*; 6:00 p.m., ESPN+		at Liberty	L 52–89	2–8	14 – Sanders	9 – Stredic	2 – Sanders	Liberty Arena (3,169); Lynchburg, VA
December 18, 2024*; 7:00 p.m., ESPN+		at North Texas	L 42–83	2–9	15 – Tate	3 – 2 tied	4 – Sisk	The Super Pit (2,568); Denton, TX
December 21, 2024*; 2:00 p.m., ESPN+		at Tulsa	L 48–93	2–10	15 – Sisk	7 – Umoh	2 – 2 tied	Reynolds Center (2,777); Tulsa, OK
December 29, 2024*; 6:00 p.m., SECN+/ESPN+		at LSU	L 45–110	2–11	8 – Stredic	3 – 4 tied	5 – Sanders	Pete Maravich Assembly Center (8,257); Baton Rouge, LA
SWAC regular season
January 4, 2025; 3:00 p.m.		at Alabama State	L 55–84	2–12 (0–1)	21 – Stredic	9 – Stredic	4 – Horton	Dunn–Oliver Acadome (2,152); Montgomery, AL
January 6, 2025; 7:00 p.m.		at Alabama A&M	L 67–79	2–13 (0–2)	17 – Tate	6 – Tate	4 – Stredic	AAMU Event Center (1,502); Huntsville, AL
January 11, 2025; 7:30 p.m.		Prairie View A&M	L 65–74	2–14 (0–3)	17 – 2 tied	6 – Stredic	2 – 3 tied	Harrison HPER Complex (1,178); Itta Bena, MS
January 13, 2025; 6:00 p.m.		Texas Southern	L 53–82	2–15 (0–4)	11 – Horton	6 – Stredic	3 – Sisk	Harrison HPER Complex (1,574); Itta Bena, MS
January 18, 2025; 4:30 p.m.		at Bethune–Cookman	L 58–83	2–16 (0–5)	19 – Stredic	6 – Sanders	6 – Sanders	Moore Gymnasium (779); Daytona Beach, FL
January 20, 2025; 6:00 p.m.		at Florida A&M	L 53–83	2–17 (0–6)	17 – Tate	8 – Stredic	1 – 3 tied	Al Lawson Center (808); Tallahassee, FL
January 25, 2025; 4:30 p.m.		Grambling State	L 54–65	2–18 (0–7)	21 – Tate	9 – Umoh	3 – Moore	Harrison HPER Complex (2,750); Itta Bena, MS
January 27, 2025; 7:30 p.m.		Southern	L 42–63	2–19 (0–8)	8 – Horton	7 – Stredic	4 – Sisk	Harrison HPER Complex (2,248); Itta Bena, MS
February 1, 2025; 5:30 p.m.		at Arkansas–Pine Bluff	W 79–76	3–19 (1–8)	20 – Tate	8 – Tate	9 – Sanders	H.O. Clemmons Arena (2,147); Pine Bluff, AR
February 8, 2025; 3:00 p.m.		at Jackson State	L 44–92	3–20 (1–9)	7 – Pace	6 – Horton	2 – Sanders	Williams Assembly Center (1,353); Jackson, MS
February 10, 2025; 6:00 p.m.		at Alcorn State	L 39–86	3–21 (1–10)	10 – Sanders	4 – Stredic	2 – Sanders	Davey Whitney Complex (250); Lorman, MS
February 15, 2025; 6:00 p.m.		Alabama A&M	L 70–82	3–22 (1–11)	15 – Horton	7 – Horton	3 – 2 tied	Harrison HPER Complex (1,204); Itta Bena, MS
February 17, 2025; 6:00 p.m.		Alabama State	L 56–79	3–23 (1–12)	12 – Horne	10 – Horton	4 – Horton	Harrison HPER Complex (1,001); Itta Bena, MS
February 22, 2025; 5:00 p.m.		at Texas Southern	L 38–79	3–24 (1–13)	9 – Sisk	8 – Stredic	2 – Stredic	H&PE Arena (1,224); Houston, TX
February 24, 2025; 7:30 p.m.		at Prairie View A&M	L 56–64	3–25 (1–14)	16 – Stredic	9 – Stredic	5 – Sanders	William Nicks Building (358); Prairie View, TX
March 1, 2025; 6:00 p.m.		Arkansas–Pine Bluff	L 58–83	3–26 (1–15)	12 – 2 tied	8 – Umoh	3 – Sanders	Harrison HPER Complex (2,122); Itta Bena, MS
March 6, 2025; 7:30 p.m.		Alcorn State	L 64–72	3–27 (1–16)	17 – Sisk	4 – 2 tied	4 – Sanders	Harrison HPER Complex (1,985); Itta Bena, MS
March 8, 2025; 6:00 p.m.		Jackson State	L 62–66	3–28 (1–17)	16 – Tate	7 – 2 tied	5 – Sanders	Harrison HPER Complex (3,914); Itta Bena, MS
*Non-conference game. ^{#}Rankings from AP poll. (#) Tournament seedings in parentheses. All times are in Central.
