= 2024–25 Bethune–Cookman Wildcats men's basketball team =

American college basketball season

2024–25 Bethune–Cookman Wildcats men's basketball
- Conference: Southwestern Athletic Conference
- Record: 17–16 (13–5 SWAC)
- Head coach: Reggie Theus (4th season)
- Assistant coaches: Patrick Eberhart; Billy Garrett; Richard Grant; Ambrose Mosley
- Home arena: Moore Gymnasium

2024–25 SWAC men's basketball standings
	Conf.				Overall
Team	W		L	PCT	W		L	PCT
Southern	15	–	3	.833	20	–	12	.625
Jackson State	14	–	4	.778	16	–	18	.471
Bethune–Cookman	13	–	5	.722	17	–	16	.515
Texas Southern	12	–	6	.667	15	–	17	.469
Alabama State †	12	–	6	.667	20	–	16	.556
Alcorn State	11	–	7	.611	11	–	21	.344
Florida A&M	10	–	8	.556	14	–	17	.452
Grambling State	7	–	11	.389	12	–	22	.353
Alabama A&M	6	–	12	.333	10	–	22	.313
Prairie View A&M	4	–	14	.222	5	–	27	.156
Arkansas–Pine Bluff	3	–	15	.167	6	–	25	.194
Mississippi Valley State	1	–	17	.056	3	–	28	.097
† 2025 SWAC tournament winner

The 2024–25 Bethune–Cookman Wildcats men's basketball team represented Bethune–Cookman University during the 2024–25 NCAA Division I men's basketball season. The Wildcats, led by fourth-year head coach Reggie Theus, played their home games at Moore Gymnasium in Daytona Beach, Florida as members of the Southwestern Athletic Conference (SWAC).

== Previous season ==
The Wildcats finished the 2023–24 season 17–17, 11–7 in SWAC play, to finish in a tie for fifth place. They defeated Southern, before falling to top-seeded and eventual tournament champions Grambling State in the semifinals of the SWAC tournament. They received an invitation to the CBI, receiving the #13 seed, where they fell to Arkansas State in the first round.

== Roster ==
2024–25 Bethune–Cookman Wildcats men's basketball team
Players
Coaches

Pos.	#	Name	Height	Weight	Year	Previous school	Hometown
G/F	0	William Gonzalez	6 ft 6 in (1.98 m)	180 lb (82 kg)	Fr	Curie HS	Chicago, IL
G	1	Trey Thomas	6 ft 2 in (1.88 m)	185 lb (84 kg)	Jr	Hampton	Washington, D.C.
G	2	Brayon Freeman	6 ft 2 in (1.88 m)	180 lb (82 kg)	Sr	Coastal Carolina	Oxon Hill, MD
G	3	Seneca Willoughby	6 ft 4 in (1.93 m)	185 lb (84 kg)	Jr	Contra Costa College	Philadelphia, PA
G	4	Antwann Jones	6 ft 6 in (1.98 m)	215 lb (98 kg)	GS	UCF	Orlando, FL
G	5	Gianni Hunt	6 ft 4 in (1.93 m)	190 lb (86 kg)	GS	Cal State Northridge	Lakewood, CA
F	10	Kalil Camara	6 ft 7 in (2.01 m)	175 lb (79 kg)	GS	West Virginia State	The Bronx, NY
G/F	11	Mason Dorsey	6 ft 5 in (1.96 m)	195 lb (88 kg)	So	Crespi HS	Los Angeles, CA
F	12	Jesus Carralero Martin	6 ft 7 in (2.01 m)	225 lb (102 kg)	GS	Missouri	Málaga, Spain
F	15	Reggie Jr. Ward	6 ft 6 in (1.98 m)	230 lb (104 kg)	Sr	Riverside City College	Chicago, IL
F	21	Jarrell Love	6 ft 7 in (2.01 m)	180 lb (82 kg)	Jr	Baton Rouge CC	Fort Worth, TX
F	23	Daniel Rouzan	6 ft 8 in (2.03 m)	235 lb (107 kg)	Jr	Manhattan	Las Vegas, NV
G	30	Simeon Womack	6 ft 2 in (1.88 m)	170 lb (77 kg)	Jr	Victory Rock Prep	Jacksonville, FL
F	32	Jerome Beya	6 ft 9 in (2.06 m)	225 lb (102 kg)	Jr	Tennessee Tech	Kinshasa, Democratic Republic of the Congo
C	33	David Onanina	6 ft 8 in (2.03 m)	230 lb (104 kg)	RS So	Eastern Kentucky	Yaoundé, Cameroon

Head coach

- Reggie Theus (UNLV)

Assistant coach(es)

- Patrick Eberhart (Adams State)
- Billy Garrett (DePaul)
- Richard Grant (Bridgeport)
- Ambrose Mosley (Old Dominion)

Legend

- (C) Team captain
- (S) Suspended
- (I) Ineligible
- (W) Walk-on
- Injured
- Current redshirt

Roster
Last update: December 1, 2024

== Schedule and results ==
Date time, TV	Rank^{#}	Opponent^{#}	Result	Record	High points	High rebounds	High assists	Site (attendance) city, state
Non-conference regular season
November 5, 2024*; 8:00 p.m., ESPN+		at Texas Tech	L 61–94	0–1	15 – Ward Jr.	7 – Ward Jr.	3 – 2 tied	United Supermarkets Arena (12,034); Lubbock, TX
November 9, 2024*; 8:00 p.m., B1G+		at Nebraska	L 58–63	0–2	10 – Hunt	7 – 2 tied	4 – 2 tied	Pinnacle Bank Arena (15,138); Lincoln, NE
November 12, 2024*; 7:00 p.m., ESPN+		at Purdue Fort Wayne	L 69–91	0–3	14 – Rouzan	6 – Rouzan	7 – Hunt	Memorial Coliseum (1,956); Fort Wayne, IN
November 16, 2024*; 2:00 p.m.		South Carolina State	W 75–62	1–3	20 – Freeman	15 – Ward Jr.	4 – Freeman	Moore Gymnasium (478); Daytona Beach, FL
November 19, 2024*; 7:30 p.m., ESPN+		at Tulane; Cancún Challenge campus game	L 57–72	1–4	22 – Freeman	7 – 2 tied	4 – Freeman	Devlin Fieldhouse (1,168); New Orleans, LA
November 26, 2024*; 3:00 p.m., FloHoops		vs. North Dakota; Cancún Challenge Mayan Division semifinals	W 79–67	2–4	26 – Freeman	6 – 3 tied	2 – Thomas	Hard Rock Hotel Riviera Maya (123); Cancún, Mexico
November 27, 2024*; 3:00 p.m., FloHoops		vs. Gardner–Webb; Cancún Challenge Mayan Division championship	L 64–79	2–5	14 – 2 tied	11 – Ward Jr.	2 – 2 tied	Hard Rock Hotel Riviera Maya (200); Cancún, Mexico
December 1, 2024*; 3:00 p.m., B1G+		at Minnesota	L 62–79	2–6	21 – Freeman	10 – Ward Jr.	5 – Freeman	Williams Arena (7,314); Minneapolis, MN
December 12, 2024*; 7:00 p.m., ACCN		at Virginia	L 41–59	2–7	14 – Freeman	7 – 2 tied	2 – 2 tied	John Paul Jones Arena (12,021); Charlottesville, VA
December 14, 2024*; 5:00 p.m., ESPN+		at West Virginia	L 61–84	2–8	14 – Freeman	7 – Ward Jr.	3 – Freeman	WVU Coliseum (9,651); Morgantown, WV
December 18, 2024*; 7:00 p.m., ESPN+		at South Florida	W 77–69	3–8	19 – Ward Jr.	10 – Ward Jr.	6 – Thomas	Yuengling Center (3,748); Tampa, FL
December 21, 2024*; 5:00 p.m., ESPN+		at Davidson	L 63–76	3–9	14 – 2 tied	7 – Ward Jr.	1 – 6 tied	John M. Belk Arena (2,192); Davidson, NC
December 30, 2024*; 9:00 p.m., SECN		at No. 17 Mississippi State	L 73–87	3–10	21 – 2 tied	14 – Ward Jr.	2 – Freeman	Humphrey Coliseum (6,567); Starkville, MS
SWAC regular season
January 4, 2025; 6:00 p.m.		at Florida A&M	W 62–55	4–10 (1–0)	14 – 2 tied	8 – 2 tied	3 – Freeman	Al Lawson Center (2,709); Tallahassee, FL
January 11, 2025; 5:30 p.m.		at Grambling State	W 65–59	5–10 (2–0)	26 – Freeman	8 – Ward Jr.	4 – Freeman	Fredrick C. Hobdy Assembly Center (1,200); Grambling, LA
January 13, 2025; 8:00 p.m.		at Southern	L 53–69	5–11 (2–1)	15 – Rouzan	8 – Ward Jr.	3 – Carralero Martin	F. G. Clark Center (3,962); Baton Rouge, LA
January 18, 2025; 5:30 p.m.		Mississippi Valley State	W 83–58	6–11 (3–1)	22 – Thomas	8 – Ward Jr.	6 – Willoughby	Moore Gymnasium (779); Daytona Beach, FL
January 20, 2025; 7:00 p.m.		Arkansas–Pine Bluff	W 73–64	7–11 (4–1)	31 – Thomas	13 – Carralero Martin	5 – Carralero Martin	Moore Gymnasium (799); Daytona Beach, FL
January 25, 2025; 3:00 p.m.		at Jackson State	L 81–86	7–12 (4–2)	20 – Thomas	10 – Camara	3 – Thomas	Williams Assembly Center (1,317); Jackson, MS
January 27, 2025; 5:30 p.m.		at Alcorn State	L 61–70	7–13 (4–3)	17 – Rouzan	8 – Carralero Martin	5 – Willoughby	Davey Whitney Complex (135); Lorman, MS
February 1, 2025; 5:30 p.m.		Alabama State	W 67–64	8–13 (5–3)	19 – Thomas	13 – Camara	4 – Willoughby	Moore Gymnasium (990); Daytona Beach, FL
February 3, 2025; 7:00 p.m.		Alabama A&M	W 89–75	9–13 (6–3)	24 – Thomas	11 – Carralero Martin	12 – Willoughby	Moore Gymnasium (993); Daytona Beach, FL
February 8, 2025; 5:30 p.m.		at Prairie View A&M	W 85–82	10–13 (7–3)	27 – Thomas	8 – 2 tied	5 – Willoughby	William Nicks Building (466); Prairie View, TX
February 10, 2025; 8:00 p.m.		at Texas Southern	W 80–77	11–13 (8–3)	24 – Rouzan	6 – Rouzan	7 – Carralero Martin	H&PE Arena (1,487); Houston, TX
February 15, 2025; 5:30 p.m.		Alcorn State	L 74–78	11–14 (8–4)	28 – Thomas	10 – Rouzan	6 – Carralero Martin	Moore Gymnasium (872); Daytona Beach, FL
February 17, 2025; 7:00 p.m.		Jackson State	L 71–84	11–15 (8–5)	20 – Rouzan	6 – Rouzan	6 – Thomas	Moore Gymnasium (991); Daytona Beach, FL
February 22, 2025; 5:00 p.m.		at Alabama A&M	W 68–64	12–15 (9–5)	19 – Rouzan	10 – Carralero Martin	6 – Carralero Martin	AAMU Events Center (2,461); Huntsville, AL
February 24, 2025; 7:00 p.m.		at Alabama State	W 70–68	13–15 (10–5)	23 – Thomas	8 – 2 tied	6 – Willoughby	Dunn–Oliver Acadome (801); Montgomery, AL
March 1, 2025; 5:30 p.m.		Southern	W 70–69	14–15 (11–5)	20 – Thomas	8 – Willoughby	7 – Carralero Martin	Moore Gymnasium (359); Daytona Beach, FL
March 3, 2025; 7:00 p.m.		Grambling State	W 78–71	15–15 (12–5)	27 – Thomas	10 – Carralero Martin	10 – Carralero Martin	Moore Gymnasium (679); Daytona Beach, FL
March 8, 2025; 5:30 p.m.		Florida A&M	W 76–75	16–15 (13–5)	22 – Camara	5 – 3 tied	5 – Freeman	Moore Gymnasium (992); Daytona Beach, FL
SWAC tournament
March 13, 2025; 8:30 pm, ESPN+	(3)	vs. (6) Alcorn State; Quarterfinals	W 69–60	17–15	19 – Freeman	8 – Thomas	5 – Thomas	Gateway Center Arena (978); College Park, GA
March 14, 2025; 8:30 pm, ESPN+	(3)	vs. (2) Jackson State; Semifinals	L 50–71	17–16	14 – Rouzan	9 – Carralero Martin	4 – Carralero Martin	Gateway Center Arena (2,894); College Park, GA
*Non-conference game. ^{#}Rankings from AP poll. (#) Tournament seedings in parentheses. All times are in Eastern.
