= 2024–25 Arkansas–Pine Bluff Golden Lions men's basketball team =

American college basketball season

2024–25 Arkansas–Pine Bluff Golden Lions men's basketball
- Conference: Southwestern Athletic Conference
- Record: 6–25 (3–15 SWAC)
- Head coach: Solomon Bozeman (4th season)
- Associate head coach: Jeremiah Bozeman
- Assistant coaches: Christian Robertson; Dee Wallace; Reginald Rogers
- Home arena: H.O. Clemmons Arena

2024–25 SWAC men's basketball standings
	Conf.				Overall
Team	W		L	PCT	W		L	PCT
Southern	15	–	3	.833	20	–	12	.625
Jackson State	14	–	4	.778	16	–	18	.471
Bethune–Cookman	13	–	5	.722	17	–	16	.515
Texas Southern	12	–	6	.667	15	–	17	.469
Alabama State †	12	–	6	.667	20	–	16	.556
Alcorn State	11	–	7	.611	11	–	21	.344
Florida A&M	10	–	8	.556	14	–	17	.452
Grambling State	7	–	11	.389	12	–	22	.353
Alabama A&M	6	–	12	.333	10	–	22	.313
Prairie View A&M	4	–	14	.222	5	–	27	.156
Arkansas–Pine Bluff	3	–	15	.167	6	–	25	.194
Mississippi Valley State	1	–	17	.056	3	–	28	.097
† 2025 SWAC tournament winner

The 2024–25 Arkansas–Pine Bluff Golden Lions men's basketball team represented the University of Arkansas at Pine Bluff during the 2024–25 NCAA Division I men's basketball season. The Golden Lions, led by fourth-year head coach Solomon Bozeman, played their home games at the H.O. Clemmons Arena in Pine Bluff, Arkansas as members of the Southwestern Athletic Conference (SWAC).

== Previous season ==
The Golden Lions finished the 2023–24 season 13–18, 8–10 in SWAC play, to finish in a tie for eighth place. Due to a tiebreaking clause, they failed to qualify for the SWAC tournament, as only the top eight teams are eligible to compete.

== Roster ==
2024–25 Arkansas–Pine Bluff Golden Lions men's basketball team
Players
Coaches

Pos.	#	Name	Height	Weight	Year	Previous school	Hometown
G	0	Trejon Ware	5 ft 9 in (1.75 m)	160 lb (73 kg)	Sr	Arkansas Baptist College	Pearland, TX
G	1	Christian Moore	5 ft 11 in (1.8 m)	175 lb (79 kg)	Jr	North Texas	Jacksonville, AR
G	2	Zach Reinhart	6 ft 6 in (1.98 m)	195 lb (88 kg)	Jr	PHS Academy	Orlando, FL
G	3	Anthony Sellars	6 ft 7 in (2.01 m)	215 lb (98 kg)	So	Three Rivers College	Winston-Salem, NC
G	4	Dante Sawyer	6 ft 4 in (1.93 m)	200 lb (91 kg)	Jr	North Idaho College	San Francisco, CA
G	8	Chop Paljor	6 ft 2 in (1.88 m)	185 lb (84 kg)	GS	OTE Prep	Omaha, NE
F	9	Klemen Vuga	6 ft 9 in (2.06 m)	240 lb (109 kg)	Sr	Monmouth	Mengeš, Slovenia
G	10	Landon Johnson	6 ft 0 in (1.83 m)	240 lb (109 kg)	Sr	Bartlett HS	Memphis, TN
G	13	Raphael Dumont	6 ft 4 in (1.93 m)	200 lb (91 kg)	Fr	Vanier Prep	Quebec City, QC
F	15	Dennis Asoro	6 ft 8 in (2.03 m)	215 lb (98 kg)	Jr	Hocking College	Columbus, OH
F	22	Robert Lewis	6 ft 9 in (2.06 m)	210 lb (95 kg)	Jr	Cardinal Ritter Prep	St. Louis, MO
G	23	Matthew Spears	6 ft 4 in (1.93 m)	215 lb (98 kg)	Sr	LeMoyne–Owen	Indianapolis, IN
F	24	Kyle Brown	6 ft 9 in (2.06 m)	240 lb (109 kg)	Jr	Indian River State College	Fort Lauderdale, FL
G	33	Quentin Bolton	6 ft 6 in (1.98 m)	220 lb (100 kg)	Jr	Charleston Southern	Racine, WI
G	55	Caleb Jones	6 ft 1 in (1.85 m)	185 lb (84 kg)	Fr	North Gwinnett HS	Atlanta, GA

Head coach

- Solomon Bozeman (Little Rock)

Assistant coach(es)

- Jeremiah Bozeman (Auburn Montgomery)
- Christian Robertson (Arkansas–Pine Bluff)
- Dee Wallace (Cal State Bakersfield)
- Reginald Rogers (Pitt–Bradford)

Legend

- (C) Team captain
- (S) Suspended
- (I) Ineligible
- (W) Walk-on
- Injured
- Current redshirt

Roster
Last update: November 25, 2024

== Schedule and results ==
Date time, TV	Rank^{#}	Opponent^{#}	Result	Record	High points	High rebounds	High assists	Site (attendance) city, state
Non-conference regular season
November 4, 2024*; 6:00 p.m., ESPN+		at No. 20 Cincinnati	L 54–109	0–1	11 – Sawyer	7 – Reinhart	3 – Moore	Fifth Third Arena (10,290); Cincinnati, OH
November 6, 2024*; 7:00 p.m.		Champion Christian	W 99–57	1–1	24 – Vuga	11 – 2 tied	7 – Reinhart	H.O. Clemmons Arena (642); Pine Bluff, AR
November 9, 2024*; 2:00 p.m., ESPN+		at Tulsa	L 80–103	1–2	15 – 2 tied	10 – Lewis	4 – Reinhart	Reynolds Center (2,753); Tulsa, OK
November 12, 2024*; 6:00 p.m., ESPN+		at South Florida	L 69–85	1–3	24 – Sawyer	8 – 2 tied	5 – Moore	Yuengling Center (4,404); Tampa, FL
November 16, 2024*; 3:00 p.m., ESPN+		at Incarnate Word	L 64–92	1–4	19 – Vuga	6 – Vuga	5 – Moore	McDermott Center (112); San Antonio, TX
November 18, 2024*; 7:00 p.m., ESPN+		at Texas Tech	L 64–98	1–5	20 – Moore	5 – Vuga	5 – Moore	United Supermarkets Arena (9,847); Lubbock, TX
November 24, 2024*; 4:00 p.m., SECN		at Missouri	L 63–112	1–6	22 – Paljor	7 – 2 tied	3 – Jones	Mizzou Arena (8,496); Columbia, MO
November 27, 2024*; 7:00 p.m., ESPN+		at Pacific	L 71–83	1–7	16 – 2 tied	6 – Dumon	4 – 2 tied	Alex G. Spanos Center (1,020); Stockton, CA
December 1, 2024*; 1:00 p.m., ESPN+		at Kansas State	L 73–120	1–8	15 – Paljor	5 – Dumont	8 – Jones	Bramlage Coliseum (7,971); Manhattan, KS
December 7, 2024*; 6:00 p.m., ESPN+		Central Arkansas	W 84–78	2–8	22 – Bolton	7 – 2 tied	11 – Moore	H.O. Clemmons Arena (2,485); Pine Bluff, AR
December 11, 2024*; 6:30 p.m., ESPN+		at Louisiana–Monroe	L 73–89	2–9	14 – 2 tied	6 – Dumont	4 – 3 tied	Fant–Ewing Coliseum (1,032); Monroe, LA
December 15, 2024*; 2:00 p.m., SECN		at Texas	L 57–121	2–10	14 – Moore	6 – Bolton Jr.	3 – Moore	Moody Center (10,514); Austin, TX
December 17, 2024*; 12:00 p.m.		Ecclesia	W 120–61	3–10	16 – Asoro	11 – Dumont	13 – Moore	H.O. Clemmons Arena (3,412); Pine Bluff, AR
SWAC regular season
January 4, 2025; 4:00 p.m.		at Alabama A&M	L 79–89	3–11 (0–1)	30 – Bradley	8 – Bradley	6 – Moore	Alabama A&M Events Center (1,871); Huntsville, AL
January 6, 2025; 6:00 p.m.		at Alabama State	L 91–93	3–12 (0–2)	35 – Bradley	7 – 2 tied	7 – Bradley	Dunn–Oliver Acadome (475); Montgomery, AL
January 13, 2025; 5:30 p.m.		Prairie View A&M	L 64–75	3–13 (0–3)	22 – Moore	12 – Bradley	3 – 2 tied	H.O. Clemmons Arena (2,175); Pine Bluff, AR
January 18, 2025; 5:00 p.m.		at Florida A&M	L 76–86	3–14 (0–4)	24 – Bradley	12 – Bradley	7 – Bradley	Al Lawson Center (910); Tallahassee, FL
January 20, 2025; 7:00 p.m.		at Bethune–Cookman	L 64–73	3–15 (0–5)	23 – Bradley	7 – Bolton	4 – 2 tied	Moore Gymnasium (799); Daytona Beach, FL
January 25, 2025; 5:30 p.m.		Southern	L 67–83	3–16 (0–6)	13 – Bradley	10 – Bradley	5 – Bradley	H.O. Clemmons Arena (2,674); Pine Bluff, AR
January 27, 2025; 5:30 p.m.		Grambling State	L 77–81	3–17 (0–7)	17 – Bradley	7 – Bradley	9 – Moore	H.O. Clemmons Arena (1,428); Pine Bluff, AR
February 1, 2025; 5:30 p.m.		Mississippi Valley State	L 76–79	3–18 (0–8)	29 – Bradley	9 – Bradley	4 – Bradley	H.O. Clemmons Arena (2,147); Pine Bluff, AR
February 4, 2025; 5:30 p.m.		Texas Southern	W 69–68	4–18 (1–8)	13 – 2 tied	16 – Bradley	7 – Bradley	H.O. Clemmons Arena (1,364); Pine Bluff, AR
February 8, 2025; 3:00 p.m.		at Alcorn State	L 60–79	4–19 (1–9)	15 – Bradley	9 – Bradley	4 – 2 tied	Davey Whitney Complex (250); Lorman, MS
February 10, 2025; 7:00 p.m.		at Jackson State	L 78–94	4–20 (1–10)	22 – Bradley	10 – Bradley	10 – Bradley	Williams Assembly Center (741); Jackson, MS
February 15, 2025; 5:30 p.m.		Alabama State	L 63–75	4–21 (1–11)	13 – Brown	11 – Bradley	4 – 2 tied	H.O. Clemmons Arena (1,475); Pine Bluff, AR
February 17, 2025; 5:30 p.m.		Alabama A&M	L 61–75	4–22 (1–12)	21 – Bradley	8 – Bradley	5 – Bradley	H.O. Clemmons Arena (746); Pine Bluff, AR
February 22, 2025; 4:30 p.m.		at Prairie View A&M	W 75–64	5–22 (2–12)	23 – Brown	14 – Bradley	5 – Brown	William Nicks Building (876); Prairie View, TX
February 24, 2025; 7:00 p.m.		at Texas Southern	L 56–81	5–23 (2–13)	13 – Brown	7 – Bradley	5 – Bradley	H&PE Arena (1,489); Houston, TX
March 1, 2025; 6:00 p.m.		at Mississippi Valley State	W 83–58	6–23 (3–13)	26 – Bradley	10 – Vuga	3 – 2 tied	Harrison HPER Complex (2,122); Itta Bena, MS
March 6, 2025; 5:30 p.m.		Jackson State	L 69–76	6–24 (3–14)	20 – Bradley	9 – Bradley	8 – Moore	H.O. Clemmons Arena (1,386); Pine Bluff, AR
March 8, 2025; 5:30 p.m.		Alcorn State	L 63–65	6–25 (3–15)	20 – Bradley	10 – Bradley	5 – Bradley	H.O. Clemmons Arena (1,345); Pine Bluff, AR
*Non-conference game. ^{#}Rankings from AP poll. (#) Tournament seedings in parentheses. All times are in Central.
