= 2024–25 Alabama A&M Bulldogs basketball team =

American college basketball season

2024–25 Alabama A&M Bulldogs basketball
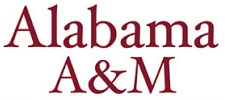
- Conference: Southwestern Athletic Conference
- Record: 10–22 (6–12 SWAC)
- Head coach: Otis Hughley Jr. (3rd season)
- Associate head coach: Cal Cochran
- Assistant coaches: Rodney Broughton Jr.; Brandon Houston; Jero Chun-Chieh Yang
- Home arena: AAMU Event Center

2024–25 SWAC men's basketball standings
	Conf.				Overall
Team	W		L	PCT	W		L	PCT
Southern	15	–	3	.833	20	–	12	.625
Jackson State	14	–	4	.778	16	–	18	.471
Bethune–Cookman	13	–	5	.722	17	–	16	.515
Texas Southern	12	–	6	.667	15	–	17	.469
Alabama State †	12	–	6	.667	20	–	16	.556
Alcorn State	11	–	7	.611	11	–	21	.344
Florida A&M	10	–	8	.556	14	–	17	.452
Grambling State	7	–	11	.389	12	–	22	.353
Alabama A&M	6	–	12	.333	10	–	22	.313
Prairie View A&M	4	–	14	.222	5	–	27	.156
Arkansas–Pine Bluff	3	–	15	.167	6	–	25	.194
Mississippi Valley State	1	–	17	.056	3	–	28	.097
† 2025 SWAC tournament winner

The 2024–25 Alabama A&M Bulldogs basketball team represented Alabama A&M University during the 2024–25 NCAA Division I men's basketball season. The Bulldogs, led by third-year head coach Otis Hughley Jr., played their home games at the Alabama A&M Events Center in Huntsville, Alabama as members of the Southwestern Athletic Conference.

== Previous season ==
The Bulldogs finished the 2023–24 season 12–23, 9–9 in SWAC play to finish in seventh place. In the SWAC tournament, they defeated Alcorn State in the first round, before falling to Texas Southern in the semifinals. They received an invitation to the CIT, defeating Austin Peay in the first round, before falling to Norfolk State in the semifinals.

== Roster ==
2024–25 Alabama A&M Bulldogs men's basketball team
Players
Coaches

Pos.	#	Name	Height	Weight	Year	Hometown
G	0	AC Bryant	6 ft 3 in (1.91 m)	185 lb (84 kg)	Jr	Shreveport, Louisiana
G	2	Bilal Abdur-Rahman	5 ft 11 in (1.8 m)	160 lb (73 kg)	Fr	Atlanta, Georgia
G	3	Eric Lee	6 ft 4 in (1.93 m)	195 lb (88 kg)	Sr	Tampa, Florida
G	5	London Riley	6 ft 3 in (1.91 m)	180 lb (82 kg)	Sr	Atlanta, Georgia
G	6	Jaylen Colon	6 ft 2 in (1.88 m)	168 lb (76 kg)	Fr	Acworth, Georgia
F	7	Saliou Seye	7 ft 0 in (2.13 m)	218 lb (99 kg)	Jr	Dakar, Senegal
G	8	Dylan Mclean	6 ft 4 in (1.93 m)	190 lb (86 kg)	Sr	Brooklyn, New York
G	9	EJay Greer	6 ft 7 in (2.01 m)	170 lb (77 kg)	So	Lansdowne, Pennsylvania
F	10	Clance Crosby	6 ft 9 in (2.06 m)	215 lb (98 kg)	Sr	Oklahoma City, Oklahoma
F	11	Austin Harvell	6 ft 6 in (1.98 m)	215 lb (98 kg)	Sr	Athens, Georgia
G	12	Warren Yeh	6 ft 5 in (1.96 m)	180 lb (82 kg)	Fr	New Taipei, Taiwan
F	13	Angok Anyang	6 ft 9 in (2.06 m)	206 lb (93 kg)	So	Adelaide, South Australia
F	14	Ademola Oladipo	6 ft 6 in (1.98 m)	200 lb (91 kg)	So	Houston, Texas
G/F	22	Lorenzo Downey	6 ft 5 in (1.96 m)	215 lb (98 kg)	Sr	Dartmouth, Nova Scotia
F	23	Chad Moodie	6 ft 8 in (2.03 m)	225 lb (102 kg)	So	Atlanta, Georgia
G	24	Nari Jordan	6 ft 8 in (2.03 m)	215 lb (98 kg)	Sr	Jacksonville, Florida
G	30	Darius Ford	5 ft 11 in (1.8 m)	155 lb (70 kg)	GS	Fort Worth, Texas
F	34	Bol Kuir	7 ft 3 in (2.21 m)	235 lb (107 kg)	Jr	South Sudan
G	55	Aaron Smith	6 ft 4 in (1.93 m)	185 lb (84 kg)	So	Atlanta, Georgia

Head coach

- Otis Hughley Jr. (West Alabama)

Assistant coach(es)

- Cal Cochran (Chattanooga)
- Rodney Broughton Jr. (South Alabama)
- Brandon Houston (Alabama A&M)
- Jero Chun-Chieh Yang (National Chengchi)

Legend

- (C) Team captain
- (S) Suspended
- (I) Ineligible
- (W) Walk-on
- Injured
- Current redshirt

Roster
Last update: November 19, 2024

== Schedule and results ==
Date time, TV	Rank^{#}	Opponent^{#}	Result	Record	Site (attendance) city, state
Non-conference regular season
November 7, 2024*; 5:30 pm		Oakwood	W 121–78	1–0	AAMU Event Center (481); Huntsville, AL
November 11, 2024*; 7:00 pm		Arkansas Baptist	W 103–57	2–0	AAMU Event Center (1,352); Huntsville, AL
November 13, 2024*; 7:00 pm		Fisk	W 103–69	3–0	AAMU Event Center (1,157); Huntsville, AL
November 16, 2024*; 7:00 pm, ESPN+		at Tennessee State	L 71–81	3–1	Gentry Complex (995); Nashville, TN
November 19, 2024*; 6:00 pm, SECN+/ESPN+		at Georgia	L 45–93	3–2	Stegeman Coliseum (5,775); Athens, GA
November 22, 2024*; 7:00 pm		South Carolina State; Bulldog Bash	L 70–82	3–3	AAMU Event Center (1,431); Huntsville, AL
November 23, 2024*; 4:00 pm		Coastal Carolina; Bulldog Bash	W 77–70	4–3	AAMU Event Center (1,651); Huntsville, AL
November 25, 2024*; 2:00 pm		IU Indy; Bulldog Bash	L 83–88	4–4	AAMU Event Center (320); Huntsville, AL
November 30, 2024*; 7:00 pm		Lipscomb	L 44–82	4–5	AAMU Event Center (1,371); Huntsville, AL
December 15, 2024*; 2:00 pm, ESPN+		at Chattanooga	L 63–85	4–6	McKenzie Arena (2,926); Chattanooga, TN
December 18, 2024*; 6:30 pm, ESPN+		at UAB	L 67–96	4–7	Bartow Arena (3,661); Birmingham, AL
December 21, 2024*; 7:00 pm		Samford	L 90–97	4–8	AAMU Event Center (1,003); Huntsville, AL
December 28, 2024*; 11:00 am, ACCN		at Georgia Tech	L 49–92	4–9	McCamish Pavilion (4,430); Atlanta, GA
SWAC regular season
January 4, 2025; 4:00 pm		Arkansas–Pine Bluff	W 89–79	5–9 (1–0)	AAMU Event Center (1,871); Huntsville, AL
January 6, 2025; 7:00 pm		Mississippi Valley State	W 79–67	6–9 (2–0)	AAMU Event Center (1,502); Huntsville, AL
January 11, 2025; 3:00 pm		at Alcorn State	L 52–62	6–10 (2–1)	Davey Whitney Complex (115); Lorman, MS
January 13, 2025; 7:00 pm		at Jackson State	L 93–103 ^{3OT}	6–11 (2–2)	Williams Assembly Center (943); Jackson, MS
January 18, 2025; 4:00 pm		Alabama State	L 65–69	6–12 (2–3)	AAMU Event Center (6,569); Huntsville, AL
January 25, 2025; 4:00 pm		Texas Southern	L 78–82	6–13 (2–4)	AAMU Event Center (1,311); Huntsville, AL
January 27, 2025; 7:00 pm		Prairie View A&M	W 98–82	7–13 (3–4)	AAMU Event Center (1,239); Huntsville, AL
February 1, 2025; 5:00 pm		at Florida A&M	L 79–95	7–14 (3–5)	Al Lawson Center (1,000); Tallahassee, FL
February 3, 2025; 6:00 pm		at Bethune–Cookman	L 75–89	7–15 (3–6)	Moore Gymnasium (993); Daytona Beach, FL
February 8, 2025; 4:00 pm		Southern	L 68–81	7–16 (3–7)	AAMU Event Center (2,751); Huntsville, AL
February 10, 2025; 7:00 pm		Grambling State	L 61–72	7–17 (3–8)	AAMU Event Center (1,329); Huntsville, AL
February 15, 2025; 6:00 pm		at Mississippi Valley State	W 82–70	8–17 (4–8)	Harrison HPER Complex (1,204); Itta Bena, MS
February 17, 2025; 5:30 pm		at Arkansas–Pine Bluff	W 75–61	9–17 (5–8)	H. O. Clemmons Arena (746); Pine Bluff, AR
February 22, 2025; 4:00 pm		Bethune–Cookman	L 64–68	9–18 (5–9)	AAMU Event Center (2,461); Huntsville, AL
February 24, 2025; 7:00 pm		Florida A&M	W 77–66	10–18 (6–9)	AAMU Event Center (2,121); Huntsville, AL
March 1, 2025; 3:00 pm		at Alabama State	L 52–94	10–19 (6–10)	Dunn–Oliver Acadome (1,916); Montgomery, AL
March 6, 2025; 4:30 pm		at Grambling State	L 51–67	10–20 (6–11)	Fredrick C. Hobdy Assembly Center (532); Grambling, LA
March 8, 2025; 4:30 pm		at Southern	L 57–71	10–21 (6–12)	F. G. Clark Center (5,687); Baton Rouge, LA
SWAC tournament
March 11, 2025; 2:00 pm, ESPN+	(9)	vs. (8) Grambling State; First round	L 56–73	10–22	Gateway Center Arena (450); College Park, GA
*Non-conference game. ^{#}Rankings from AP Poll. (#) Tournament seedings in parentheses. All times are in Central.
