= 2024–25 Southern Jaguars basketball team =

American college basketball season

2024–25 Southern Jaguars basketball
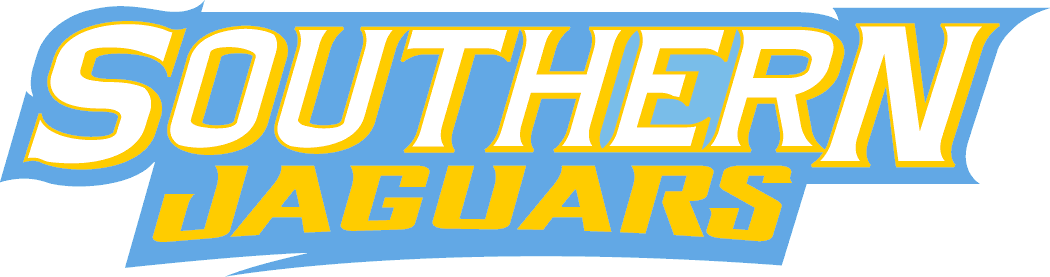

SWAC regular season champions
- Conference: Southwestern Athletic Conference
- Record: 20–12 (15–3 SWAC)
- Head coach: Kevin Johnson (2nd season)
- Assistant coaches: Jethro Hillman; Rennie Bailey; Rashaad Richardson; Jon Tavel
- Home arena: F. G. Clark Center

2024–25 SWAC men's basketball standings
	Conf.				Overall
Team	W		L	PCT	W		L	PCT
Southern	15	–	3	.833	20	–	12	.625
Jackson State	14	–	4	.778	16	–	18	.471
Bethune–Cookman	13	–	5	.722	17	–	16	.515
Texas Southern	12	–	6	.667	15	–	17	.469
Alabama State †	12	–	6	.667	20	–	16	.556
Alcorn State	11	–	7	.611	11	–	21	.344
Florida A&M	10	–	8	.556	14	–	17	.452
Grambling State	7	–	11	.389	12	–	22	.353
Alabama A&M	6	–	12	.333	10	–	22	.313
Prairie View A&M	4	–	14	.222	5	–	27	.156
Arkansas–Pine Bluff	3	–	15	.167	6	–	25	.194
Mississippi Valley State	1	–	17	.056	3	–	28	.097
† 2025 SWAC tournament winner

The 2024–25 Southern Jaguars basketball team represented Southern University during the 2024–25 NCAA Division I men's basketball season. The Jaguars, led by second-year head coach Kevin Johnson, played their home games at the F. G. Clark Center in Baton Rouge, Louisiana as members of the Southwestern Athletic Conference (SWAC).

== Previous season ==
The Jaguars finished the 2023–24 season 18–14, 12–6 in SWAC play, to finish in a tie for third place. They were defeated by Bethune–Cookman in the quarterfinals of the SWAC tournament.

== Roster ==
2024–25 Southern Jaguars men's basketball team
Players
Coaches

Pos.	#	Name	Height	Weight	Year	Previous school	Hometown
C	0	Brentay Noel	6 ft 10 in (2.08 m)	220 lb (100 kg)	So	Baton Rouge Prep	Baton Rouge, LA
F	1	DaMariee Jones	6 ft 5 in (1.96 m)	185 lb (84 kg)	Sr	Mobile	Bessemer, AL
G	2	Joe Manning	6 ft 2 in (1.88 m)	175 lb (79 kg)	Jr	Northwest Florida State	Bossier City, LA
G	3	Cam Amboree	6 ft 3 in (1.91 m)	180 lb (82 kg)	Jr	Oral Roberts	Pearland, TX
F	4	Derrick Tezeno	6 ft 4 in (1.93 m)	205 lb (93 kg)	Sr	Stephen F. Austin	Melville, LA
G	5	Jayce Depron	6 ft 3 in (1.91 m)	175 lb (79 kg)	Fr	Madison Prep Academy	White Castle, LA
C	8/23	Dionjahe Thomas	6 ft 8 in (2.03 m)	230 lb (104 kg)	RS So	McNeese	Houma, LA
G	9/30	Andre Nunley	5 ft 10 in (1.78 m)	180 lb (82 kg)	GS	Prairie View A&M	Euless, TX
G	10	Michael Jacobs	6 ft 2 in (1.88 m)	200 lb (91 kg)	Jr	Lawson State CC	Atlanta, GA
G	11	Jordan Johnson	6 ft 4 in (1.93 m)	195 lb (88 kg)	RS So	Northeastern Oklahoma A&M	West Palm Beach, FL
F	12	AJ Barnes	6 ft 6 in (1.98 m)	210 lb (95 kg)	Jr	Chipola College	Atlanta, GA
F	13	Lionel Bell	6 ft 9 in (2.06 m)	210 lb (95 kg)	Fr	Booker T. Washington HS	New Orleans, LA
G	14	Chase Sample	5 ft 10 in (1.78 m)	165 lb (75 kg)	So	Scotlandville HS	Baton Rouge, LA
G	22	Tidjiane Dioumassi	6 ft 4 in (1.93 m)	200 lb (91 kg)	Sr	Lee College	Paris, France
G/F	24	Puoch "PJ" Dobuol	6 ft 8 in (2.03 m)	180 lb (82 kg)	Jr	LSU Eunice	St. Cloud, MN
F	35	Delang Muon	6 ft 9 in (2.06 m)	210 lb (95 kg)	So	Grace Baptist Academy	Frankston, Australia

Head coach

- Kevin Johnson (UTPA)

Assistant coach(es)

- Jethro Hillman (Miami (FL))
- Rennie Bailey (Louisiana Tech)
- Rashaad Richardson (Georgia State)
- Jon Tavel (Tulane)

Legend

- (C) Team captain
- (S) Suspended
- (I) Ineligible
- (W) Walk-on
- Injured
- Current redshirt

Roster
Last update: November 30, 2024

== Schedule and results ==
Date time, TV	Rank^{#}	Opponent^{#}	Result	Record	High points	High rebounds	High assists	Site (attendance) city, state
Non-conference regular season
November 4, 2024*; 8:00 p.m., SLN		at South Dakota	L 79–93	0–1	30 – Dioumassi	9 – Jones	4 – Jacobs	Sanford Coyote Sports Center (2,013); Vermillion, SD
November 7, 2024*; 7:00 p.m., B1G+		at Iowa	L 74–89	0–2	14 – Barnes	7 – 2 tied	6 – Jacobs	Carver–Hawkeye Arena (8,105); Iowa City, IA
November 13, 2024*; 6:30 p.m., ESPN+		at East Texas A&M	L 68–70	0–3	20 – Amboree	7 – Barnes	6 – Dioumassi	The Field House (624); Commerce, TX
November 17, 2024*; 3:00 p.m.		Ecclesia	W 131–42	1–3	16 – 2 tied	12 – Dobuol	10 – Dioumassi	F. G. Clark Center (2,125); Baton Rouge, LA
November 20, 2024*; 7:00 p.m., SECN+/ESPN+		at No. 23 Texas A&M	L 54–71	1–4	19 – Johnson	5 – Tezeno	4 – Jacobs	Reed Arena (7,061); College Station, TX
November 25, 2024*; 11:00 a.m.		Champion Christian	W 121–58	2–4	19 – Jacobs	7 – 2 tied	4 – Amboree	F. G. Clark Center (1,897); Baton Rouge, LA
November 30, 2024*; 10:30 a.m., ESPN+		at Louisiana Tech	W 73–70	3–4	21 – 2 tied	6 – Tezeno	7 – Dioumassi	Thomas Assembly Center (2,257); Ruston, LA
December 7, 2024*; 2:00 p.m., ESPN+		at Tulsa	W 70–66	4–4	19 – Jacobs	6 – 2 tied	2 – Nunley	Reynolds Center (2,716); Tulsa, OK
December 10, 2024*; 11:00 a.m.		Lindsey Wilson	W 94–69	5–4	23 – Jacobs	8 – Thomas	10 – Amboree	F. G. Clark Center (3,655); Baton Rouge, LA
December 17, 2024*; 6:00 p.m., SECN+/ESPN+		at No. 17 Ole Miss	L 61–74	5–5	11 – 2 tied	7 – Tezeno	9 – Dioumassi	SJB Pavilion (6,796); Oxford, MS
December 20, 2024*; 9:00 p.m., ESPN+		at Loyola Marymount	L 73–89	5–6	19 – Dobuol	10 – Dobuol	4 – Jacobs	Gersten Pavilion (789); Los Angeles, CA
December 22, 2024*; 3:00 p.m., BTN		at USC	L 51–82	5–7	10 – 3 tied	5 – Tezeno	2 – 2 tied	Galen Center (4,127); Los Angeles, CA
December 30, 2024*; 8:00 p.m., BTN		at Nebraska	L 43–77	5–8	13 – Depron	8 – Nunley	3 – Manning	Pinnacle Bank Arena (14,855); Lincoln, NE
SWAC regular season
January 4, 2025; 5:00 p.m.		at Texas Southern	W 67–58	6–8 (1–0)	20 – Johnson	7 – Barnes	3 – Manning	H&PE Arena (2,079); Houston, TX
January 6, 2025; 7:30 p.m.		at Prairie View A&M	W 84–80	7–8 (2–0)	19 – Barnes	9 – Barnes	6 – Jacobs	William Nicks Building (253); Prairie View, TX
January 11, 2025; 5:00 p.m.		Florida A&M	W 91–57	8–8 (3–0)	15 – Jones	11 – Noel	5 – 2 tied	F. G. Clark Center (3,745); Baton Rouge, LA
January 13, 2025; 6:30 p.m.		Bethune–Cookman	W 69–53	9–8 (4–0)	15 – Thomas	13 – Thomas	4 – Manning	F. G. Clark Center (3,962); Baton Rouge, LA
January 18, 2025; 4:00 p.m.		Grambling State	W 67–60	10–8 (5–0)	15 – Jones	9 – Jones	5 – Jacobs	F. G. Clark Center (6,489); Baton Rouge, LA
January 25, 2025; 5:30 p.m.		at Arkansas–Pine Bluff	W 83–67	11–8 (6–0)	19 – Thomas	9 – Thomas	4 – Manning	H.O. Clemmons Arena (2,674); Pine Bluff, AR
January 27, 2025; 6:00 p.m.		at Mississippi Valley State	W 63–42	12–8 (7–0)	16 – Johnson	7 – Dobuol	3 – Johnson	Harrison HPER Complex (2,248); Itta Bena, MS
February 1, 2025; 5:00 p.m.		Alcorn State	W 74–69	13–8 (8–0)	13 – Amboree	11 – Jones	5 – Amboree	F. G. Clark Center (5,673); Baton Rouge, LA
February 3, 2025; 6:30 p.m.		Jackson State	W 91–89 ^{OT}	14–8 (9–0)	18 – Amboree	9 – Thomas	4 – Nunley	F. G. Clark Center (5,621); Baton Rouge, LA
February 8, 2025; 4:00 p.m.		at Alabama A&M	W 81–68	15–8 (10–0)	22 – Manning	11 – Thomas	5 – Jacobs	AAMU Events Center (2,751); Huntsville, AL
February 10, 2025; 6:00 p.m.		at Alabama State	L 81–82	15–9 (10–1)	17 – Amboree	9 – Thomas	5 – Manning	Dunn–Oliver Acadome (1,255); Montgomery, AL
February 15, 2025; 4:30 p.m.		Prairie View A&M	W 72–60	16–9 (11–1)	11 – Jones	7 – 3 tied	5 – Jacobs	F. G. Clark Center (4,689); Baton Rouge, LA
February 17, 2025; 8:00 p.m., ESPNU/ESPN+		Texas Southern	W 66–57	17–9 (12–1)	20 – Jacobs	7 – Jones	4 – Nunley	F. G. Clark Center (5,679); Baton Rouge, LA
February 22, 2025; 4:30 p.m.		at Grambling State	W 71–64	18–9 (13–1)	22 – Johnson	8 – Jones	1 – 6 tied	Fredrick C. Hobdy Assembly Center (3,205); Grambling, LA
March 1, 2025; 4:30 p.m.		at Bethune–Cookman	L 69–70	18–10 (13–2)	19 – Jacobs	5 – 2 tied	3 – 2 tied	Moore Gymnasium (359); Daytona Beach, FL
March 3, 2025; 6:00 p.m.		at Florida A&M	W 73–70	19–10 (14–2)	17 – Johnson	6 – Noel	3 – Jacobs	Al Lawson Center (1,345); Tallahassee, FL
March 6, 2025; 8:00 p.m.		Alabama State	L 65–66	19–11 (14–3)	27 – Jacobs	7 – Noel	4 – Amboree	F. G. Clark Center (4,689); Baton Rouge, LA
March 8, 2025; 4:30 p.m.		Alabama A&M	W 71–57	20–11 (15–3)	14 – Johnson	10 – Tezeno	5 – Manning	F. G. Clark Center (5,687); Baton Rouge, LA
SWAC tournament
March 12, 2025; 3:00 p.m., ESPN+	(1)	vs. (8) Grambling State; Quarterfinals	L 62–65 ^{OT}	20–12	12 – 2 tied	13 – Thomas	3 – 2 tied	Gateway Center Arena (801); College Park, GA
*Non-conference game. ^{#}Rankings from AP poll. (#) Tournament seedings in parentheses. All times are in Central.
