= 2025 SWAC men's basketball tournament =

American collegiate Tournament

- Classification: Division I
- Season: 2024–25
- Teams: 10
- Site: Gateway Center Arena; College Park, Georgia
- Champions: Alabama State (5th title)
- Winning coach: Tony Madlock (1st title)
- Television: ESPN+, ESPNU

2024–25 SWAC men's basketball standings
	Conf.				Overall
Team	W		L	PCT	W		L	PCT
Southern	15	–	3	.833	20	–	12	.625
Jackson State	14	–	4	.778	16	–	18	.471
Bethune–Cookman	13	–	5	.722	17	–	16	.515
Texas Southern	12	–	6	.667	15	–	17	.469
Alabama State †	12	–	6	.667	20	–	16	.556
Alcorn State	11	–	7	.611	11	–	21	.344
Florida A&M	10	–	8	.556	14	–	17	.452
Grambling State	7	–	11	.389	12	–	22	.353
Alabama A&M	6	–	12	.333	10	–	22	.313
Prairie View A&M	4	–	14	.222	5	–	27	.156
Arkansas–Pine Bluff	3	–	15	.167	6	–	25	.194
Mississippi Valley State	1	–	17	.056	3	–	28	.097
† 2025 SWAC tournament winner

The 2025 SWAC Men's Basketball Tournament was the postseason men's basketball tournament for the 2024–25 season in the Southwestern Athletic Conference (SWAC). The tournament was held from March 11–15, 2025 at Gateway Center Arena in College Park, Georgia. The tournament winner, Alabama State, received an automatic invitation to the 2025 NCAA Division I Men's Basketball Tournament. The tournament was sponsored by Pepsi.

== Seeds ==
Teams will be seeded by record within the conference, with a tie–breaker system to seed teams with identical conference records. Only the top ten teams in the conference will qualify for the tournament, after the conference expanded the tournament field from eight to ten teams.

Seed	School	Conference	Tiebreaker
1	Southern	15–3	
2	Jackson State	14–4	
3	Bethune–Cookman	13–5	
4	Texas Southern	12–6	1–0 vs. Alabama State
5	Alabama State	12–6	0–1 vs. Texas Southern
6	Alcorn State	11–7	
7	Florida A&M	10–8	
8	Grambling State	7–11	
9	Alabama A&M	6–12	
10	Prairie View A&M	4–14	
DNQ	Arkansas–Pine Bluff	3–15	
DNQ	Mississippi Valley State	1–17	

== Schedule ==
Game	Time*	Matchup^{#}	Score	Television
First round – Tuesday, March 11
1	2:00 p.m.	No. 8 Grambling State vs. No. 9 Alabama A&M	73–56	ESPN+
2	8:30 p.m.	No. 7 Florida A&M vs. No. 10 Prairie View A&M	75–66	ESPN+
Quarterfinals – Wednesday, March 12
3	2:00 p.m.	No. 1 Southern vs. No. 8 Grambling State	62–65^{OT}	ESPN+
4	8:30 p.m.	No. 2 Jackson State vs. No. 7 Florida A&M	91–76	ESPN+
Quarterfinals – Thursday, March 13
5	2:00 p.m.	No. 4 Texas Southern vs. No. 5 Alabama State	79–84	ESPN+
6	8:30 p.m.	No. 3 Bethune–Cookman vs. No. 6 Alcorn State	69–60	ESPN+
Semifinals – Friday, March 14
7	2:00 p.m.	No. 8 Grambling State vs. No. 5 Alabama State	62–64	ESPN+
8	8:30 p.m.	No. 2 Jackson State vs. No. 3 Bethune–Cookman	71–50	ESPN+
Championship – Saturday, March 15
9	9:30 p.m.	No. 5 Alabama State vs. No. 2 Jackson State	60–56	ESPNU
*Game times in EDT. #-Rankings denote tournament seeding.

== Bracket ==
First round March 11, 2025; ESPN+
8	Grambling State	73
9	Alabama A&M	56
7	Florida A&M	75
10	Prairie View A&M	66

Quarterfinals; March 12–13, 2025; ESPN+
1	Southern	62
8	Grambling State	65^{OT}
4	Texas Southern	79
5	Alabama State	84
2	Jackson State	91
7	Florida A&M	76
3	Bethune–Cookman	69
6	Alcorn State	60

Semifinals; March 14, 2025; ESPN+
8	Grambling State	62
5	Alabama State	64
2	Jackson State	71
3	Bethune–Cookman	50

Championship; March 15, 2025; ESPNU
5	Alabama State	60
2	Jackson State	56
