= 2024–25 Alcorn State Braves basketball team =

American college basketball season

2024–25 Alcorn State Braves basketball
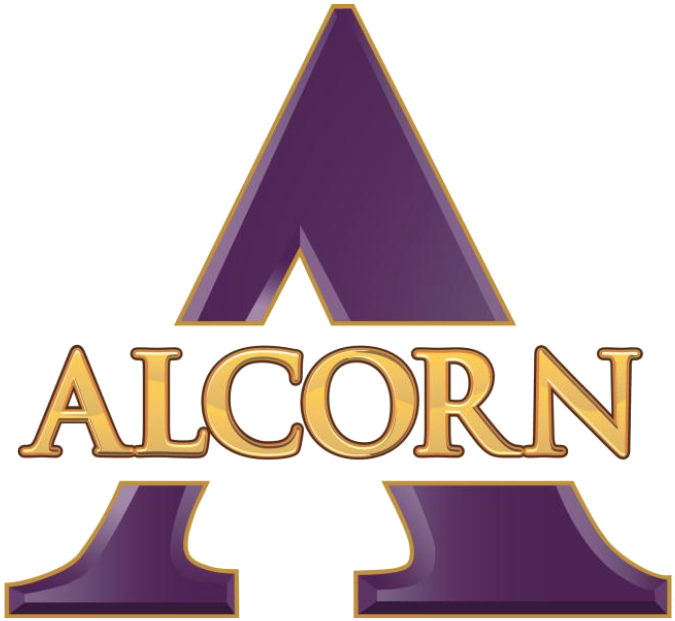
- Conference: Southwestern Athletic Conference
- Record: 11–21 (11–7 SWAC)
- Head coach: Landon Bussie (5th season)
- Assistant coaches: Adam Schwartz; Benjamin Mandelbaum; Travonta Marsaw; Kyron Gibson
- Home arena: Davey Whitney Complex

2024–25 SWAC men's basketball standings
| | Conf. | | | | Overall |
| Team | W | | L | PCT | W | | L | PCT |
|---|---|---|---|---|---|---|---|---|
| Southern | 15 | – | 3 | .833 | 20 | – | 12 | .625 |
| Jackson State | 14 | – | 4 | .778 | 16 | – | 18 | .471 |
| Bethune–Cookman | 13 | – | 5 | .722 | 17 | – | 16 | .515 |
| Texas Southern | 12 | – | 6 | .667 | 15 | – | 17 | .469 |
| Alabama State † | 12 | – | 6 | .667 | 20 | – | 16 | .556 |
| Alcorn State | 11 | – | 7 | .611 | 11 | – | 21 | .344 |
| Florida A&M | 10 | – | 8 | .556 | 14 | – | 17 | .452 |
| Grambling State | 7 | – | 11 | .389 | 12 | – | 22 | .353 |
| Alabama A&M | 6 | – | 12 | .333 | 10 | – | 22 | .313 |
| Prairie View A&M | 4 | – | 14 | .222 | 5 | – | 27 | .156 |
| Arkansas–Pine Bluff | 3 | – | 15 | .167 | 6 | – | 25 | .194 |
| Mississippi Valley State | 1 | – | 17 | .056 | 3 | – | 28 | .097 |
† 2025 SWAC tournament winner

The 2024–25 Alcorn State Braves basketball team represented Alcorn State University during the 2024–25 NCAA Division I men's basketball season. The Braves, led by fifth-year head coach Landon Bussie, played their home games at the Davey Whitney Complex in Lorman, Mississippi as members of the Southwestern Athletic Conference (SWAC).

== Previous season ==
The Braves finished the 2023–24 season 14–17, 13–5 in SWAC play, to finish in second place. In the SWAC tournament, they were defeated in the quarterfinal round by Alabama A&M.

== Roster ==
2024–25 Alcorn State Braves men's basketball team
Players
Coaches

| Pos. | # | Name | Height | Weight | Year | Hometown |
|---|---|---|---|---|---|---|
| F | 0 | Josh Mitchell | 6 ft 8 in (2.03 m) | 230 lb (104 kg) | GS | Tupelo, MS |
| G | 1 | Mike Pajeaud | 6 ft 2 in (1.88 m) | 183 lb (83 kg) | Sr | New Orleans, LA |
| G | 2 | Keionte Cornelius | 6 ft 0 in (1.83 m) | 190 lb (86 kg) | Sr | Flint, MI |
| G | 3 | Davian Williams | 6 ft 0 in (1.83 m) | 160 lb (73 kg) | Fr | Vicksburg, MS |
| G | 4 | Willie Lightfoot | 6 ft 0 in (1.83 m) | 170 lb (77 kg) | Jr | Niagara Falls, NY |
| G | 5 | Tyrese Elliott | 6 ft 3 in (1.91 m) | 170 lb (77 kg) | Jr | Grayson, GA |
| G/F | 7 | Julian Lual | 6 ft 6 in (1.98 m) | 200 lb (91 kg) | Sr | Calgary, AB |
| G/F | 8 | Tycen McDaniels | 6 ft 8 in (2.03 m) | 188 lb (85 kg) | So | Columbus, GA |
| G | 9 | Jalyke Gaines-Wyatt | 6 ft 0 in (1.83 m) | 186 lb (84 kg) | So | Wyandanch, NY |
| F | 10 | Antonio Lisenbee | 6 ft 7 in (2.01 m) | 195 lb (88 kg) | Jr | Indianapolis, IN |
| G | 11 | Marcus Tankersley | 6 ft 4 in (1.93 m) | 190 lb (86 kg) | Jr | Chattanooga, TN |
| G/F | 12 | Omari Hamilton | 6 ft 6 in (1.98 m) | 195 lb (88 kg) | Jr | Brooklyn, NY |
| G | 13 | Dakari Thomas | 6 ft 2 in (1.88 m) | 180 lb (82 kg) | So | Amityville, NY |
| G | 14 | Cameron Butler | 6 ft 0 in (1.83 m) | 175 lb (79 kg) | Sr | Vicksburg, MS |
| F/C | 15 | Djahi Binet | 6 ft 7 in (2.01 m) | 215 lb (98 kg) | Sr | Nice, France |
| G | 21 | Kameron Foman | 6 ft 4 in (1.93 m) | 178 lb (81 kg) | So | Hartsville, SC |
| G | 22 | Kevin Firle | 5 ft 11 in (1.8 m) | 180 lb (82 kg) | So | Collins, MS |
| G/F | 23 | Daniel Braster | 6 ft 8 in (2.03 m) | 215 lb (98 kg) | Sr | Old Westbury, NY |
| G | 24 | Del'Jayvien Harried | 6 ft 3 in (1.91 m) | 175 lb (79 kg) | Sr | Natchez, MS |

Head coach

- Landon Bussie (Xavier (LA))

Assistant coach(es)

- Adam Schwartz (UNLV)
- Benjamin Mandelbaum (Minnesota)
- Travonta Marsaw (Southern Miss)
- Kyron Gibson (Drake)

Legend

- (C) Team captain
- (S) Suspended
- (I) Ineligible
- (W) Walk-on
- Injured
- Current redshirt

Roster
Last update: December 2, 2024

== Schedule and results ==
| Date time, TV | Rank^{#} | Opponent^{#} | Result | Record | High points | High rebounds | High assists | Site (attendance) city, state |
Non-conference regular season
| November 4, 2024*; 8:00 p.m., ESPN+ | | at Utah | L 59–100 | 0–1 | 8 – Cornelius | 6 – Mitchell | 4 – Pajeaud | Jon M. Huntsman Center (6,785); Salt Lake City, UT |
| November 6, 2024*; 8:00 p.m., MSN | | at Utah State | L 46–101 | 0–2 | 11 – Cornelius | 5 – Mitchell | 3 – 2 tied | Smith Spectrum (8,131); Logan, UT |
| November 9, 2024*; 3:00 p.m. | | at Xavier (LA) | L 56–62 | 0–3 | 14 – Gaines-Wyatt | 6 – 4 tied | 3 – 2 tied | Convocation Center (2,264); New Orleans, LA |
| November 11, 2024*; 6:30 p.m., ESPN+ | | at Tulane | L 51–84 | 0–4 | 15 – Braster | 6 – Braster | 7 – Pajeaud | Devlin Fieldhouse (1,202); New Orleans, LA |
| November 19, 2024*; 7:00 p.m., ESPN+ | | at TCU; Acrisure Invitational on-campus game | L 48–71 | 0–5 | 13 – Cornelius | 5 – 3 tied | 4 – Gaines-Wyatt | Schollmaier Arena (4,707); Fort Worth, TX |
| November 22, 2024*; 9:00 p.m., BTN | | at Washington; Acrisure Invitational on-campus game | L 60–77 | 0–6 | 13 – Cornelius | 6 – Pajeaud | 6 – Gaines-Wyatt | Alaska Airlines Arena (6,299); Seattle, WA |
| November 24, 2024*; 4:00 p.m., ESPN+ | | at UC Riverside; Acrisure Invitational on-campus game | L 52–69 | 0–7 | 16 – Hamilton | 16 – Binet | 4 – Gaines-Wyatt | SRC Arena (337); Riverside, CA |
| November 29, 2024*; 10:00 a.m. | | at South Alabama | L 65–74 | 0–8 | 24 – Cornelius | 11 – Binet | 5 – Pajeaud | Mitchell Center (250); Mobile, AL |
| December 1, 2024*; 11:00 a.m., BTN | | at Maryland | L 58–96 | 0–9 | 12 – Cornelius | 6 – Binet | 4 – Gaines-Wyatt | Xfinity Center (9,504); College Park, MD |
| December 4, 2024*; 6:30 p.m., ESPN+ | | at Wichita State | L 54–78 | 0–10 | 14 – Hamilton | 11 – Binet | 4 – Tankersley | Charles Koch Arena (5,642); Wichita, KS |
| December 7, 2024*; 7:00 p.m., SECN+/ESPN+ | | at No. 21 Oklahoma | L 78–94 | 0–11 | 16 – Hamilton | 6 – Binet | 7 – Williams | McCasland Field House (1,611); Norman, OK |
| December 16, 2024*; 7:00 p.m., ESPN+ | | at Rice | L 75–77 | 0–12 | 21 – Gaines-Wyatt | 9 – Pajeaud | 3 – 2 tied | Tudor Fieldhouse (1,297); Houston, TX |
| December 22, 2024*; 2:00 p.m., ESPN+ | | at UAB | L 74–91 | 0–13 | 22 – Cornelius | 5 – 2 tied | 3 – 3 tied | Bartow Arena (3,110); Birmingham, AL |
SWAC regular season
| January 4, 2025; 2:30 p.m. | | Jackson State | L 69–72 | 0–14 (0–1) | 25 – Tankersley | 8 – Tankersley | 2 – Tankersley | Davey Whitney Complex (1,244); Lorman, MS |
| January 11, 2025; 3:00 p.m. | | Alabama A&M | W 62–52 | 1–14 (1–1) | 16 – Binet | 9 – Binet | 6 – Gaines-Wyatt | Davey Whitney Complex (115); Lorman, MS |
| January 13, 2025; 6:00 p.m. | | Alabama State | W 67–65 | 2–14 (2–1) | 13 – 2 tied | 6 – 2 tied | 4 – Pajeaud | Davey Whitney Complex (305); Lorman, MS |
| January 18, 2025; 5:00 p.m. | | at Texas Southern | L 57–66 | 2–15 (2–2) | 13 – Williams | 16 – Binet | 2 – 3 tied | H&PE Arena (1,489); Houston, TX |
| January 20, 2025; 7:30 p.m. | | at Prairie View A&M | W 78–70 | 3–15 (3–2) | 17 – Gaines-Wyatt | 17 – Binet | 4 – Gaines-Wyatt | William Nicks Building (411); Prairie View, TX |
| January 25, 2025; 3:00 p.m. | | Florida A&M | L 64–65 | 3–16 (3–3) | 15 – Williams | 6 – 2 tied | 4 – Pajeaud | Davey Whitney Complex (250); Lorman, MS |
| January 27, 2025; 5:00 p.m. | | Bethune–Cookman | W 70–61 | 4–16 (4–3) | 17 – Tankersley | 9 – Pajeaud | 4 – Pajeaud | Davey Whitney Complex (135); Lorman, MS |
| February 1, 2025; 4:30 p.m. | | at Southern | L 69–74 | 4–17 (4–4) | 15 – Cornelius | 10 – Binet | 7 – Gaines-Wyatt | F. G. Clark Center (5,673); Baton Rouge, LA |
| February 3, 2025; 8:00 p.m., ESPNU | | at Grambling State | W 60–53 | 5–17 (5–4) | 14 – Cornelius | 8 – Mitchell | 3 – Pajeaud | Fredrick C. Hobdy Assembly Center (2,313); Grambling, LA |
| February 8, 2025; 3:00 p.m. | | Arkansas–Pine Bluff | W 79–60 | 6–17 (6–4) | 15 – Tankersley | 12 – Pajeaud | 6 – Gaines-Wyatt | Davey Whitney Complex (250); Lorman, MS |
| February 10, 2025; 6:00 p.m. | | Mississippi Valley State | W 86–39 | 7–17 (7–4) | 14 – Gaines-Wyatt | 10 – Binet | 3 – Tankersley | Davey Whitney Complex (250); Lorman, MS |
| February 15, 2025; 4:30 p.m. | | at Bethune–Cookman | W 78–74 | 8–17 (8–4) | 24 – Gaines-Wyatt | 7 – Pajeaud | 3 – Gaines-Wyatt | Moore Gymnasium (872); Daytona Beach, FL |
| February 17, 2025; 6:00 p.m. | | at Florida A&M | L 76–85 | 8–18 (8–5) | 22 – Gaines-Wyatt | 7 – Binet | 2 – Gaines-Wyatt | Al Lawson Center; Tallahassee, FL |
| February 22, 2025; 3:30 p.m. | | at Jackson State | L 63–71 | 8–19 (8–6) | 18 – Tankersley | 8 – Binet | 5 – Gaines-Wyatt | Williams Assembly Center (2,907); Jackson, MS |
| March 1, 2025; 3:00 p.m. | | Prairie View A&M | W 71–55 | 9–19 (9–6) | 15 – 2 tied | 9 – Pajeaud | 6 – Gaines-Wyatt | Davey Whitney Complex (300); Lorman, MS |
| March 3, 2025; 6:00 p.m. | | Texas Southern | L 59–75 | 9–20 (9–7) | 16 – 2 tied | 11 – Binet | 2 – 2 tied | Davey Whitney Complex (458); Lorman, MS |
| March 6, 2025; 6:00 p.m. | | at Mississippi Valley State | W 72–64 | 10–20 (10–7) | 21 – Binet | 10 – 2 tied | 5 – Williams | Harrison HPER Complex (1,985); Itta Bena, MS |
| March 8, 2025; 5:30 p.m. | | at Arkansas–Pine Bluff | W 65–63 | 11–20 (11–7) | 15 – Lual | 9 – Binet | 5 – Pajeaud | H.O. Clemmons Arena (1,345); Pine Bluff, AR |
SWAC tournament
| March 13, 2025; 8:30 p.m., ESPN+ | (6) | vs. (3) Bethune–Cookman; Quarterfinals | L 60–69 | 11–21 | 21 – Gaines-Wyatt | 9 – Pajeaud | 5 – Gaines-Wyatt | Gateway Center Arena (978); College Park, GA |
*Non-conference game. ^{#}Rankings from AP poll. (#) Tournament seedings in parentheses. All times are in Central.
