= Tony Madlock =

American basketball player and coach (born 1970)

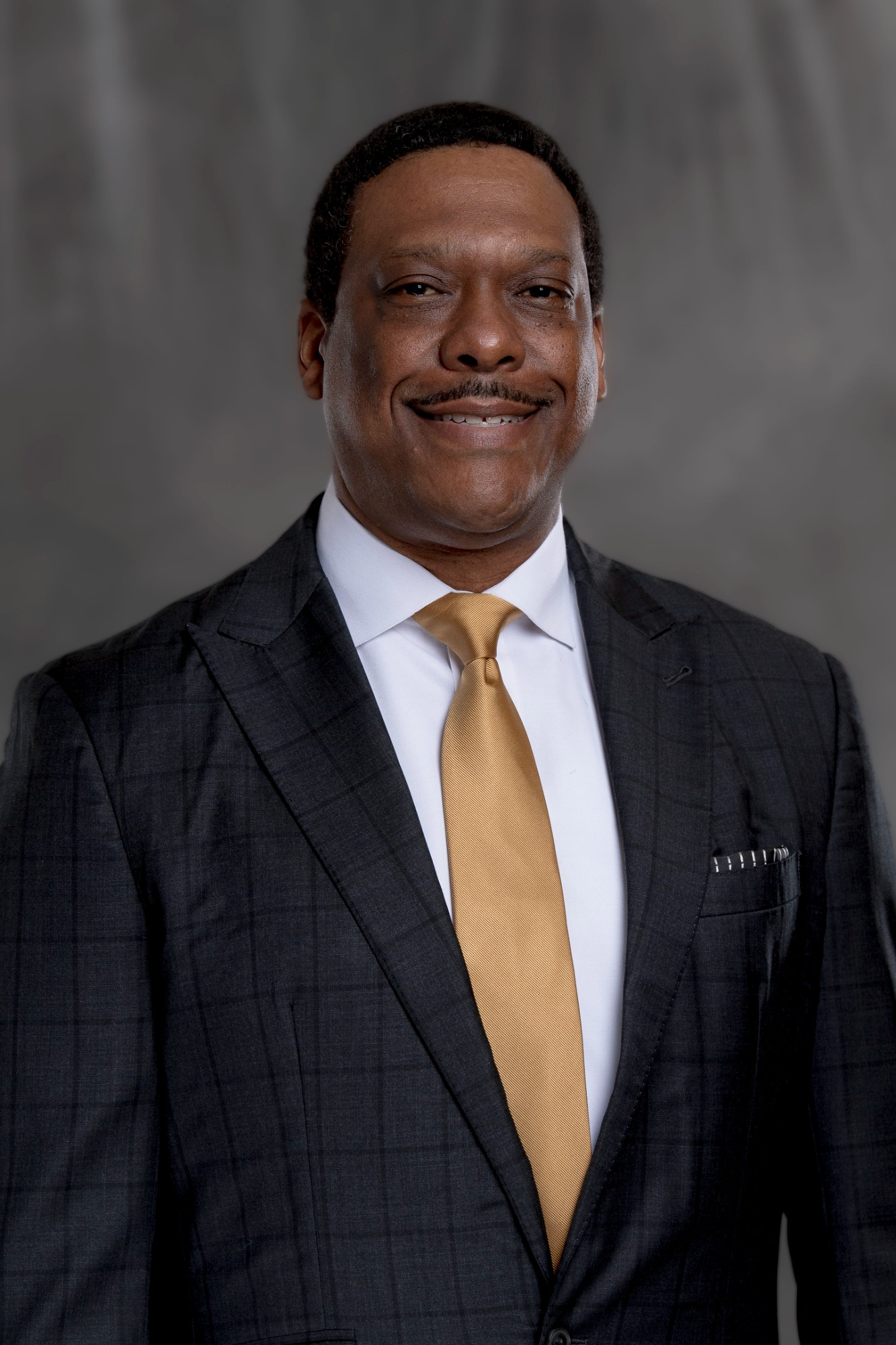
- Madlock in 2022

Current position
- Title: Associate head coach
- Team: Memphis
- Conference: American

Biographical details
- Born: February 17, 1970 (age 56); Memphis, Tennessee, U.S.

Playing career
- 1989–1992: Memphis

Coaching career (HC unless noted)
- 1995–1997: Melrose HS (TN) (assistant)
- 1997–2006: Arkansas State (assistant)
- 2006–2010: UTEP (assistant)
- 2010–2014: Auburn (assistant)
- 2014–2018: Ole Miss (assistant)
- 2018: Ole Miss (interim HC)
- 2018–2021: Memphis (assistant)
- 2021–2022: South Carolina State
- 2022–2026: Alabama State
- 2026–present: Memphis (associate HC)

Head coaching record
- Overall: 67–100 (.401)
- Tournaments: 1–1 (NCAA)

Accomplishments and honors

Championships
- SWAC tournament (2025)

Antonio Dewane Madlock (born February 17, 1970) is an American basketball coach who is currently the associate head coach for the Memphis Tigers. He was previously head coach of the Alabama State Hornets men's basketball team and the South Carolina State. Madlock was named as a finalist for the Joe B. Hall Award, given to college basketball’s top first-year coach after leading South Carolina State to its highest win total since 2015–16.

== Playing career ==
A Memphis native who starred at Melrose High School, Madlock played collegiately for Memphis under Larry Finch from 1988 to 1992, and was part of the Tigers' 1992 Elite Eight squad during his senior year. He still ranks as the all-time leader in games played with 128.

== Coaching career ==
Madlock began his coaching career at his high school alma mater for three seasons, helping guide Melrose to a state tournament runner-up finish in 1997. He'd get his first college coaching position at Arkansas State, working under Dickey Nutt. There he was part of the Red Wolves' 1999 NCAA tournament squad. In 2006, Madlock would join Tony Barbee's staff at UTEP, helping the Miners to a Conference USA regular season title and NCAA Tournament appearance in 2010. He'd follow Barbee to Auburn the following season, and in 2014, Madlock would join Andy Kennedy's staff at Ole Miss. On February 18, 2018, Kennedy announced his resignation from the head coaching position, and Madlock was named interim head coach for the remainder of the season. Madlock would compile a 1–4 record.

After the 2018 season, Madlock would return to Memphis, reuniting with college teammate Penny Hardaway as an assistant coach for the Tigers. On March 25, 2021, Madlock was named the head coach at South Carolina State, replacing Murray Garvin. After one season at South Carolina State where he guided the team to a 15–16 overall record, Madlock was named the head coach at Alabama State, replacing Mo Williams who departed for the Jackson State head coaching position.

== Head coaching record ==
Record table
Season	Team	Overall	Conference	Standing	Postseason
Ole Miss Rebels (Southeastern Conference) (2018)
2017–18	Ole Miss	1–4	1–3	14th	
Ole Miss:		1–4 (.200)	1–3 (.250)		
South Carolina State Bulldogs (Mid-Eastern Athletic Conference) (2021–2022)
2021–22	South Carolina State	15–16	7–7	5th	
South Carolina State:		15–16 (.484)	7–7 (.500)		
Alabama State Hornets (Southwestern Athletic Conference) (2022–2026)
2022–23	Alabama State	8–23	6–12	9th	
2023–24	Alabama State	13–19	8–10	T–8th	
2024–25	Alabama State	20–16	12–6	T–4th	NCAA Division I Round of 64
2025–26	Alabama State	10–22	7–11	T–9th	
Alabama State:		51–80 (.389)	33–39 (.458)		
Total:		67–100 (.401)			
National champion Postseason invitational champion Conference regular season champion Conference regular season and conference tournament champion Division regular season champion Division regular season and conference tournament champion Conference tournament champion
