= 2025–26 Southwestern Athletic Conference men's basketball season =

College men's basketball season

- League: NCAA Division I
- Sport: Basketball
- Teams: 12
- TV partner(s): ESPN, HBCU GO, SWAC TV

Regular season
- Regular season champion: Bethune-Cookman (3rd title)
- Season MVP: Daeshun Ruffin

SWAC tournament
- Venue: Gateway Center Arena, College Park, GA
- Champions: Prairie View A&M (3rd title)
- Runners-up: Southern
- Tournament MVP: Dontae Horne (Prairie View)

SWAC men's basketball seasons
- ← 2024–25 2026–27 →

2025–26 SWAC men's basketball standings
	Conf.				Overall
Team	W		L	PCT	W		L	PCT
Bethune–Cookman	14	–	4	.778	17	–	15	.531
Florida A&M	11	–	7	.611	15	–	16	.484
Southern	11	–	7	.611	17	–	17	.500
Texas Southern	10	–	8	.556	12	–	18	.400
Alabama A&M	10	–	8	.556	18	–	15	.545
Arkansas–Pine Bluff	10	–	8	.556	13	–	19	.406
Jackson State	10	–	8	.556	12	–	21	.364
Prairie View A&M †	9	–	9	.500	19	–	18	.514
Grambling State	7	–	11	.389	14	–	19	.424
Alabama State	7	–	11	.389	10	–	22	.313
Alcorn State	7	–	11	.389	9	–	23	.281
Mississippi Valley State	2	–	16	.111	3	–	30	.091
† 2026 SWAC tournament winner

The 2025–26 Southwestern Athletic Conference (SWAC) men's basketball season started with non-conference play on November 3, 2025, and conference play started on January 3, 2026. The regular season ended on March 5, 2026, and set up the 2026 SWAC men's basketball tournament, which took place from March 9–14, 2026, at the Gateway Center Arena in Atlanta, Georgia.

== Head coaches ==
=== Coaches ===
Team	Head Coach	Previous Job	Years At School (Note: Year at school includes 2025–26 season.)	Record at School (Note: Overall and SWAC records are from the time at their current school and are through the end of the 2024–25 season.)	SWAC Record	SWAC Titles (Note: SWAC regular-season titles at current school only.)	NCAA tournaments (Note: NCAA tournament appearances are from the time at current school only.)	NCAA Sweet 16's
Alabama A&M	Donte Jackson	Grambling State	1	0–0	0–0	0	0	0
Alabama State	Tony Madlock	South Carolina State	4	41–58	26–28	0	1	0
Alcorn State	Jake Morton	Florida State (Assistant)	1	0–0	0–0	0	0	0
Arkansas-Pine Bluff	Solomon Bozeman	Oral Roberts (Assistant)	5	36–88	22–50	0	0	0
Bethune-Cookman	Reggie Theus	Cal State Northridge	5	55–74	39–33	0	0	0
Florida A&M	Charlie Ward	Florida HS	1	0–0	0–0	0	0	0
Grambling State	Patrick Crarey II	Florida A&M	1	0–0	0–0	0	0	0
Jackson State	Mo Williams	Alabama State	4	44–53	37–17	0	0	0
Mississippi Valley State	George Ivory	Mississippi Valley State (Assistant)	3	9–85	6–47	0	0	0
Prairie View A&M	Byron Smith	Prairie View A&M	10	128–161	98–70	3	1	0
Southern	Kevin P. Johnson	Tulane (Assistant)	2	37–24	24–8	1	0	0
Texas Southern	Johnny Jones	Nevada (Associate HC)	8	121–107	80–41	0	3	0

== Preseason awards ==
=== Preseason rankings ===
SWAC Preseason Poll
Place	Team	Votes
1	Bethune–Cookman	232 (12)
2	Southern	214 (5)
3	Jackson State	208 (1)
4	Alabama State	183 (3)
5	Texas Southern	182
6	Alabama A&M	163
7	Grambling State	151
8	Florida A&M	115
9	Prairie View A&M	99
10	Alcorn State	74
11	Arkansas–Pine Bluff	70 (1)
12	Mississippi Valley State	25
(#) first-place votes

=== Preseason honors ===
Honor	Recipient	School
Preseason Player of the Year	Daeshun Ruffin	Jackson State
Preseason DPOY	Doctor Bradley	Bethune-Cookman
Preseason All-SWAC First Team	Michael Jacobs	Southern
Preseason All-SWAC First Team	Daniel Rouzan	Bethune-Cookman
Preseason All-SWAC First Team	Daeshun Ruffin	Jackson State
Preseason All-SWAC First Team	Kintavious Dozier	Alabama A&M
Preseason All-SWAC First Team	Doctor Bradley	Bethune-Cookman
Preseason All-SWAC Second Team	Zaire Hayes	Texas Southern
Preseason All-SWAC Second Team	Dorian McMillian	Jackson State
Preseason All-SWAC Second Team	Jordan Chatman	Florida A&M
Preseason All-SWAC Second Team	Seneca Willoughby	Bethune-Cookman
Preseason All-SWAC Second Team	Micah Simpson	Alabama State

== Regular season ==
=== Conference standings ===
Thru January 24, 2026

		Conference		Overall		
Rank	Team	Record	Percent	Record	Percent	Tiebreaker
1	Bethune-Cookman	5–1	.833	8–11	.421	
2	Florida A&M	5–1	.833	8–9	.471	
3	Jackson State	4–2	.667	5–14	.263	
4	Arkansas-Pine Bluff	4–3	.571	7–13	.350	
5	Alabama A&M	3–3	.500	10–9	.526	
6	Southern	3–3	.500	7–12	.368	
7	Alabama State	3–3	.500	6–13	.316	
8	Prairie View A&M	3–4	.429	8–12	.400	
9	Texas Southern	3–4	.429	5–13	.278	
10	Grambling State	2–3	.400	8–10	.444	
11	Alcorn State	2–4	.333	3–15	.167	
12	Mississippi Valley State	0–6	.000	1–19	.050	

=== Conference matrix ===
	Alabama A&M	Alabama State	Alcorn State	Arkansas-Pine Bluff	Bethune-Cookman	Florida A&M	Grambling State	Jackson State	Mississippi Valley State	Prairie View A&M	Southern	Texas Southern
vs. Alabama A&M	–	0–0	0–0	1–0	0–0	0–0	0–0	0–0	0–1	0–0	0–0	0–0
vs. Alabama State	0–0	–	1–0	0–0	0–0	0–0	0–0	0–0	0–1	0–0	0–0	0–0
vs. Alcorn State	0–0	0–0	–	0–0	0–0	0–0	0–0	1–0	0–0	0–0	0–0	0–0
vs. Arkansas-Pine Bluff	0–1	0–1	0–0	–	0–0	0–0	0–0	0–0	0–0	0–0	0–0	0–0
vs. Bethune-Cookman	0–0	0–0	0–0	0–0	–	0–1	0–0	0–0	0–0	0–0	0–0	0–0
vs. Florida A&M	0–0	0–0	0–0	0–0	1–0	–	0–0	0–0	0–0	0–0	0–0	0–0
vs. Grambling State	0–0	0–0	0–0	0–0	0–0	0–0	–	0–0	0–0	0–1	0–0	0–1
vs. Jackson State	0–0	0–0	0–1	0–0	0–0	0–0	0–0	–	0–0	0–0	0–0	0–0
vs. Mississippi Valley State	1–0	1–0	0–0	0–0	0–0	0–0	0–0	0–0	–	0–0	0–0	0–0
vs. Prairie View A&M	0–0	0–0	0–0	0–0	0–0	0–0	1–0	0–0	0–0	–	0–1	0–0
vs. Southern	0–0	0–0	0–0	0–0	0–0	0–0	0–0	0–0	0–0	1–0	–	0–1
vs. Texas Southern	0–0	0–0	0–0	0–0	0–0	0–0	1–0	0–0	0–0	0–0	1–0	–
Total	0–0	0–0	0–0	0–0	0–0	0–0	0–0	0–0	0–0	0–0	0–0	0–0

Thru January 9, 2026

=== Players of the Week ===
Week	Player of the Week	Impact Performer	Newcomer of the Week
Nov. 11	Michael James; Mississippi Valley State	Daeshun Ruffin; Jackson State	Michael James; Mississippi Valley State
Nov. 19	Troy Hupstead; Texas Southern	Troy Hupstead; Texas Southern	Sami Pissis; Alabama A&M
Nov. 25	Michael Jacobs; Southern	Tai'Reon Joseph; Prairie View A&M	Jakobi Heady; Bethune-Cookman
Dec. 3	Kintavious Dozier; Alabama A&M	Asjon Anderson; Alabama State	Michael James (**2**); Mississippi Valley State
Dec. 10	Quion Williams; Arkansas-Pine Bluff	Daeshun Ruffin (**2**); Jackson State	Milhan Charles; Arkansas-Pine Bluff
Dec. 17	Kintavious Dozier (**2**); Alabama A&M	Sami Pissis; Alabama A&M	Koron Davis; Alabama A&M
Dec. 23	Tai'Reon Joseph; Prairie View A&M	Daeshun Ruffin (**3**); Jackson State	Antonio Munoz; Grambling State
Dec. 30	Tai'Reon Joseph (**2**); Prairie View A&M	Dorian McMillian; Jackson State	Michael James (**3**); Mississippi Valley State
Jan. 6	Tai'Reon Joseph (**3**); Prairie View A&M	Alex Mirhosseini; Arkansas-Pine Bluff	Quion Williams; Arkansas-Pine Bluff
Jan. 13	Daeshun Ruffin; Jackson State	Micah Octave; Florida A&M	Cory Wells; Prairie View A&M
Jan. 20	Jakobi Heady; Bethune-Cookman	Daeshun Ruffin (**4**); Jackson State & Bryce Roberts; Texas Southern	Dontae Horne; Prairie View A&M
Jan. 29	Daeshun Ruffin (**2**); Jackson State	Doctor Bradley; Bethune-Cookman	Troy Hupstead; Texas Southern
Feb. 3	Daeshun Ruffin (**3**); Jackson State	Tai'Reon Joseph (**2**); Prairie View A&M	Koron Davis (**2**); Alabama A&M
Feb. 10	Jakobi Heady (**2**); Bethune-Cookman	Quion Williams; Arkansas-Pine Bluff & Jayme Mitchell Jr. Jackson State	Michael James (**4**); Mississippi Valley State
Feb. 17	Dontae Horne; Prairie View A&M	Daeshun Ruffin (**5**); Jackson State	Jamil Muttilib; Grambling State

=== Records against other conferences ===
Thru January 26, 2026

Major 6 Conferences	Record	Major 6 Conferences	Record
ACC	0–9	American	1–7
Big East	0–2	Big Ten	0–11
Big 12	0–15	SEC	0–22
Major 6 Total			1–66
Other Division I Conferences	Record	Other Division I Conferences	Record
Atlantic 10	0–2	ASUN	3–3
America East	0–0	Big Sky	0–0
Big South	1–1	Big West	0–3
CAA	1–2	Conference USA	0–5
Horizon League	1–0	Ivy League	0–0
Independents	0–0	MAAC	0–1
MAC	1–1	MVC	2–1
MWC	0–3	NEC	0–0
OVC	2–3	Patriot League	0–0
SoCon	0–2	Southland	1–0
**MEAC**	3–2	Summit League	0–1
Sun Belt	2–7	WAC	0–6
WCC	0–4		
Other Division I Total			17–47
NCAA Division I Total			18–113
NCAA Division II Total			1–0
NCAA Division III Total			3–0
NAIA Total			9–0
NCCAA/USCAA Total			8–0
Total Non-Conference Record			39–113

=== Record against ranked non-conference opponents ===
SWAC records against ranked teams (rankings from AP Poll, SWAC teams in Bold):

Date	Visitor	Home	Site	Score	Conference record
November 3	Southern	No. 14 Arkansas	Bud Walton Arena; Fayetteville, AR	77–109	0–1
November 3	Jackson State	No. 17 Illinois	State Farm Center; Champaign, IL	55–113	0–2
November 3	Bethune-Cookman	No. 20 Auburn	Neville Arena; Auburn, AL	90–95 OT	0–3
November 3	Texas Southern	No. 21 Gonzaga	McCarthey Athletic Center; Spokane, WA	43–98	0–4
November 6	Grambling State	No. 16 Iowa State	Hilton Coliseum; Ames, IA	62–102	0–5
November 6	Jackson State	No. 11 Louisville	KFC Yum! Center; Louisville, KY	70–106	0–6
November 19	Jackson State	No. 22 Auburn	Neville Arena; Auburn, AL	66–112	0–7
November 21	Jackson State	No. 21 Arkansas	Bud Walton Arena; Fayetteville, AR	61–115	0–8
November 29	Bethune-Cookman	No. 25 Indiana	Simon Skjodt Assembly Hall; Bloomington, IN	56–100	0–9
December 3	Alcorn State	No. 10 Iowa State	Hilton Coliseum; Ames, IA	68–132	0–10
December 10	Jackson State	No. 7 Houston	Fertitta Center; Houston, TX	38–80	0–11
December 22	Bethune-Cookman	No. 1 Arizona	McKale Memorial Center; Tucson, AZ	71–107	0–12
December 29	Southern	No. 20 Illinois	State Farm Center; Champaign, IL	55–90	0–13

Thru January 26, 2026

== Honors and awards ==
=== All-Conference awards and teams ===
The SWAC announced its all-conference teams and major honors on March 6, 2026.

Honor	Recipient
Player of the Year	Daeshun Ruffin, Jackson State
Coach of the Year	Reggie Theus, Bethune-Cookman
Defensive Player of the Year	Jerquarius Stanback, Alabama State
Newcomer of the Year	Michael James, Mississippi Valley State
Freshman of the Year	Antonio Munoz, Grambling State
First Team
First Team	Daeshun Ruffin, Jackson State
First Team	Dontae Horne, Prairie View A&M
First Team	Jakobi Heady, Bethune-Cookman
First Team	Quion Williams, Arkansas-Pine Bluff
First Team	Michael James, Mississippi Valley State
Second Team
Second Team	Kintavious Dozier, Alabama A&M
Second Team	Michael Jacobs, Southern
Second Team	Troy Hupstead, Texas Southern
Second Team	Daniel Rouzan, Bethune-Cookman
Second Team	Tai'Reon Joseph, Prairie View A&M

== Postseason ==
=== Conference tournament ===
For the first time, all teams in the conference will qualify for the 2026 SWAC men's basketball tournament. The tournament will be held at the Gateway Center Arena in Atlanta, Georgia from March 9 to 14, 2026.

First round March 9, 2026; ESPN+
10	Alabama State	65
11	Alcorn State	77
9	Grambling State	77
12	Mississippi Valley State	52

Second round March 10, 2026; ESPN+
8	Prairie View A&M	65
11	Alcorn State	56
7	Jackson State	68
9	Grambling State	65

Quarterfinals; March 11–12, 2026; ESPN+
1	Bethune–Cookman	67
8	Prairie View A&M	71
4	Texas Southern	74
5	Alabama A&M	85*
2	Florida A&M	70
7	Jackson State	60
3	Southern	84
6	Arkansas–Pine Bluff	81

Semifinals; March 13, 2026; ESPN+
8	Prairie View A&M	74
5	Alabama A&M	55
2	Florida A&M	70
3	Southern	73

Championship; March 14, 2026; ESPNU
8	Prairie View A&M	72
3	Southern	66

* denotes overtime period
