= 2025–26 Prairie View A&M Panthers basketball team =

American college basketball season

2025–26 Prairie View A&M Panthers basketball
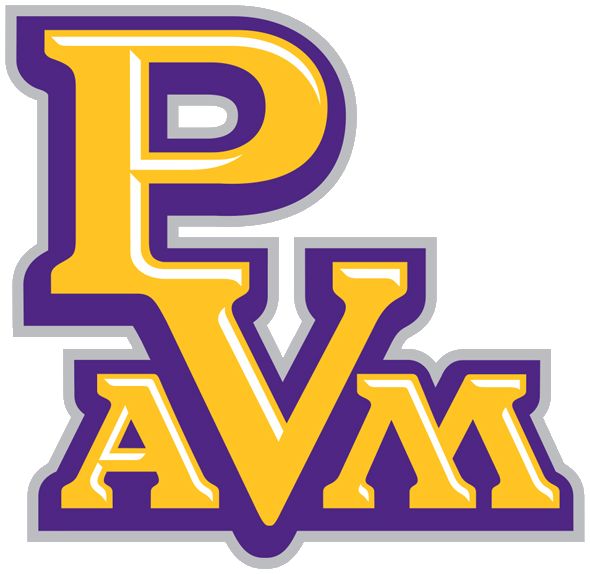

SWAC tournament champions

NCAA tournament, First round
- Conference: Southwestern Athletic Conference
- Record: 19–18 (9–9 SWAC)
- Head coach: Byron Smith (10th season)
- Assistant coaches: Spencer Robertson; Todd Shelton; Keith Berard; Donovan Greer
- Home arena: William Nicks Building

2025–26 SWAC men's basketball standings
	Conf.				Overall
Team	W		L	PCT	W		L	PCT
Bethune–Cookman	14	–	4	.778	17	–	15	.531
Florida A&M	11	–	7	.611	15	–	16	.484
Southern	11	–	7	.611	17	–	17	.500
Texas Southern	10	–	8	.556	12	–	18	.400
Alabama A&M	10	–	8	.556	18	–	15	.545
Arkansas–Pine Bluff	10	–	8	.556	13	–	19	.406
Jackson State	10	–	8	.556	12	–	21	.364
Prairie View A&M †	9	–	9	.500	19	–	18	.514
Grambling State	7	–	11	.389	14	–	19	.424
Alabama State	7	–	11	.389	10	–	22	.313
Alcorn State	7	–	11	.389	9	–	23	.281
Mississippi Valley State	2	–	16	.111	3	–	30	.091
† 2026 SWAC tournament winner

The 2025–26 Prairie View A&M Panthers basketball team represented Prairie View A&M University during the 2025–26 NCAA Division I men's basketball season. The Panthers, led by tenth-year head coach Byron Smith, played their home games at the William Nicks Building in Prairie View, Texas as members of the Southwestern Athletic Conference.

== Previous season ==
The Panthers finished the 2024–25 season 5–27, 4–14 in SWAC play, to finish in tenth place. They were defeated by Florida A&M in the first round of the SWAC tournament.

== Preseason ==
On October 8, 2025, the SWAC released their preseason polls. Prairie View A&M was picked to finish ninth in the conference.

=== Preseason rankings ===
SWAC Preseason Poll
Place	Team	Votes
1	Bethune–Cookman	232 (12)
2	Southern	214 (5)
3	Jackson State	208 (1)
4	Alabama State	183 (3)
5	Texas Southern	182
6	Alabama A&M	163
7	Grambling State	151
8	Florida A&M	115
9	Prairie View A&M	99
10	Alcorn State	74
11	Arkansas–Pine Bluff	70 (1)
12	Mississippi Valley State	25
(#) first-place votes

=== Preseason All-SWAC Teams ===
No players were named to the First or Second Preseason All-SWAC Teams.

== Roster ==
2025–26 Prairie View A&M Panthers men's basketball team
Players
Coaches

Pos.	#	Name	Height	Weight	Year	Previous school	Hometown
G	0	Joey Madimba	6 ft 5 in (1.96 m)	205 lb (93 kg)	GS	Idaho State	Mansfield, Texas
G	1	Isaiah Foster	6 ft 1 in (1.85 m)	170 lb (77 kg)	Jr	Quincy	Frisco, Texas
G	2	Dontae Horne	6 ft 4 in (1.93 m)	190 lb (86 kg)	GS	Georgia Southern	Memphis, Tennessee
G	3	Tai'Reon Joseph	6 ft 3 in (1.91 m)	180 lb (82 kg)	GS	UTSA	Baton Rouge, Louisiana
F	4	Corey Dunning	6 ft 9 in (2.06 m)	225 lb (102 kg)	GS	Xavier (LA)	Lafayette, Louisiana
G	5	Doug Young	6 ft 1 in (1.85 m)	160 lb (73 kg)	GS	Quinnipiac	Houston, Texas
G	10	Jannoy Thomas	5 ft 11 in (1.8 m)	185 lb (84 kg)	Jr	New Mexico Junior College	Toronto, Ontario
F	11	Hassane Diallo	6 ft 8 in (2.03 m)	225 lb (102 kg)	Jr	Fort Valley State	Atlanta, Georgia
G	12	Lance Williams	6 ft 1 in (1.85 m)	181 lb (82 kg)	GS	Xavier (LA)	Baton Rouge, Louisiana
F	13	Cory Wells	6 ft 7 in (2.01 m)	200 lb (91 kg)	GS	Utah Valley	Murphy, Texas
F	15	Seryee Lewis	6 ft 9 in (2.06 m)	220 lb (100 kg)	GS	Western Michigan	Chicago, Illinois
G	23	Elijah Mitchell	6 ft 5 in (1.96 m)	207 lb (94 kg)	So	Navarro College	Roanoke, Virginia
F	24	Marcel Bryant	6 ft 7 in (2.01 m)	235 lb (107 kg)	Jr	Cedar Ridge High School	Austin, Texas
F	25	Keeshawn Mason	6 ft 8 in (2.03 m)	240 lb (109 kg)	GS	Mid-America Christian	Shawnee, Oklahoma
C	34	Ryan Bolton Jr.	6 ft 10 in (2.08 m)	245 lb (111 kg)	So	Texas State	Pensacola, Florida

Head coach

- Byron Smith (Houston)

Assistant coach(es)

- Spencer Robertson (Wichita State)
- Todd Shelton (Texas Wesleyan)
- Keith Berard (Southern Utah)
- Donovan Greer (Prairie View A&M)

Legend

- (C) Team captain
- (S) Suspended
- (I) Ineligible
- (W) Walk-on
- Injured
- Current redshirt

Roster
Last update: December 14, 2025

== Schedule and results ==
Date time, TV	Rank^{#}	Opponent^{#}	Result	Record	High points	High rebounds	High assists	Site (attendance) city, state
Non-conference regular season
November 3, 2025*; 12:00 pm		Biblical Studies	W 95–48	1–0	26 – Joseph	7 – Tied	4 – Wells	William Nicks Building (437); Prairie View, TX
November 5, 2025*; 6:00 pm		Dallas	W 94–53	2–0	20 – Joseph	9 – Mason	4 – Williams	William Nicks Building (626); Prairie View, TX
November 8, 2025*; 6:00 pm, ESPN+		at Wichita State	L 62–105	2–1	15 – Tied	9 – Wells	2 – Williams	Charles Koch Arena (5,352); Wichita, KS
November 12, 2025*; 7:00 pm, ESPN+		at Oklahoma State	L 67−94	2−2	16 – Joseph	6 – Wells	4 – Horne	Gallagher-Iba Arena (5,421); Stillwater, OK
November 17, 2025*; 7:00 pm, SECN+		at Missouri	L 73−91	2−3	17 – Joseph	5 – Tied	7 – Horne	Mizzou Arena (7,595); Columbia, MO
November 22, 2025*; 4:00 pm		vs. UT Martin; Pensacola Invitational semifinals	L 68–69	2–4	22 – Tied	8 – Wells	3 – Horne	Pensacola Bay Center (874); Pensacola, FL
November 23, 2025*; 1:30 pm		vs. North Florida; Pensacola Invitational consolation game	W 85–82	3–4	25 – Joseph	12 – Mason	3 – Williams	Pensacola Bay Center (932); Pensacola, FL
November 30, 2025*; 3:00 pm, ESPN+		at North Texas	L 69–72	3–5	19 – Joseph	7 – Thomas	3 – Horne	The Super Pit (2,658); Denton, TX
December 6, 2025*; 3:00 pm		Champion Christian	W 124–62	4–5	31 – Joseph	10 – Wells	5 – Williams	William Nicks Building (200); Prairie View, TX
December 13, 2025*; 1:00 pm, SLN		at South Dakota	L 85–97	4–6	20 – Horne	6 – Tied	3 – Williams	Sanford Coyote Sports Center (1,136); Vermillion, SD
December 20, 2025*; 1:00 pm		Paul Quinn	W 101–64	5–6	26 – Joseph	12 – Wells	8 – Wells	William Nicks Building (214); Prairie View, TX
December 22, 2025*; 6:00 pm, SECN		at LSU	L 90–104	5–7	34 – Joseph	7 – Madimba	5 – Horne	Pete Maravich Assembly Center (8,174); Baton Rouge, LA
December 29, 2025*; 7:00 pm, SECN+		at Texas A&M	L 82–111	5–8	26 – Joseph	9 – Wells	6 – Williams	Reed Arena (7,797); College Station, TX
SWAC regular season
January 3, 2026; 4:00 pm		at Grambling State	L 72–76	5–9 (0–1)	21 – Joseph	10 – Wells	4 – Horne	Fredrick C. Hobdy Assembly Center (1,002); Grambling, LA
January 5, 2026; 6:00 pm		at Southern	W 89–85	6–9 (1–1)	32 – Joseph	6 – Wells	5 – Williams	F. G. Clark Center (3,876); Baton Rouge, LA
January 10, 2026; 4:30 pm		Mississippi Valley State	W 70–69	7–9 (2–1)	23 – Joseph	8 – Wells	5 – Tied	William Nicks Building (264); Prairie View, TX
January 12, 2026; 6:00 pm		Arkansas–Pine Bluff	W 73–61	8–9 (3–1)	21 – Wells	10 – Tied	7 – Williams	William Nicks Building (225); Prairie View, TX
January 17, 2026; 3:00 pm		at Jackson State	L 78–82	8–10 (3–2)	38 – Horne	11 – Wells	7 – Williams	Williams Assembly Center (1,152); Jackson, MS
January 19, 2026; 2:00 pm		at Alcorn State	L 75–76	8–11 (3–3)	32 – Horne	8 – Wells	5 – Williams	Davey Whitney Complex (454); Lorman, MS
January 24, 2026; 4:30 pm		Alabama State	L 80–95	8–12 (3–4)	30 – Horne	8 – Horne	5 – Horne	William Nicks Building (422); Prairie View, TX
January 27, 2026; 1:00 pm		Alabama A&M	L 60–80	8–13 (3–5)	15 – Joseph	9 – Mason	4 – Horne	William Nicks Building (224); Prairie View, TX
January 31, 2026; 4:30 pm		Texas Southern	W 85–78	9–13 (4–5)	31 – Joseph	8 – Horne	5 – Horne	William Nicks Building (3,040); Prairie View, TX
February 7, 2026; 4:30 pm		at Bethune–Cookman	L 76–82	9–14 (4–6)	22 – Williams	10 – Tied	2 – Horne	Moore Gymnasium (816); Daytona Beach, FL
February 9, 2026; 6:00 pm		at Florida A&M	L 96–100	9–15 (4–7)	32 – Joseph	6 – Wells	4 – Horne	Al Lawson Center (903); Tallahassee, FL
February 14, 2026; 4:30 pm		Southern	L 82–87	9–16 (4–8)	46 – Horne	5 – Tied	3 – Tied	William Nicks Building (1,001); Prairie View, TX
February 16, 2026; 6:00 pm		Grambling State	W 68–63	10–16 (5–8)	26 – Horne	8 – Tied	3 – Tied	William Nicks Building (1,135); Prairie View, TX
February 19, 2026; 7:30 pm		at Mississippi Valley State	W 72–62	11–16 (6–8)	30 – Horne	10 – Dunning	3 – Wells	Harrison HPER Complex; Itta Bena, MS
February 21, 2026; 5:30 pm		at Arkansas–Pine Bluff	L 82–84	11–17 (6–9)	32 – Horne	9 – Dunning	3 – Tied	H.O. Clemmons Arena (2,182); Pine Bluff, AR
February 26, 2026; 8:30 pm		Jackson State	W 85–76	12–17 (7–9)	26 – Horne	13 – Horne	5 – Tied	William Nicks Building (1,526); Prairie View, TX
February 28, 2026; 4:30 pm		Alcorn State	W 72–51	13–17 (8–9)	28 – Madimba	12 – Dunning	6 – Horne	William Nicks Building (965); Prairie View, TX
March 5, 2026; 7:00 pm		at Texas Southern	W 70–59	14–17 (9–9)	26 – Horne	8 – Williams	6 – Williams	H&PE Arena (2,364); Houston, TX
SWAC tournament
March 10, 2026; 1:00 pm, ESPN+	(8)	vs. (11) Alcorn State; Second round	W 65–56	15–17	26 – Horne	9 – Tied	4 – Wells	Gateway Center Arena (628); College Park, GA
March 11, 2026; 1:00 pm, ESPN+	(8)	vs. (1) Bethune–Cookman; Quarterfinal	W 71–67	16–17	30 – Horne	10 – Wells	6 – Williams	Gateway Center Arena (925); College Park, GA
March 13, 2026; 1:00 pm, ESPN+	(8)	vs. (5) Alabama A&M; Semifinal	W 74–55	17–17	25 – Horne	10 – Dunning	6 – Horne	Gateway Center Arena (1,029); College Park, GA
March 14, 2026; 6:30 pm, ESPNU	(8)	vs. (3) Southern; Championship	W 72–66	18–17	18 – Williams	9 – Dunning	5 – Tied	Gateway Center Arena (2,985); College Park, GA
NCAA tournament
March 18, 2026*; 5:40 p.m., truTV	(16 S)	vs. (16 S) Lehigh; First Four	W 67–55	19–17	25 – Horne	11 – Wells	2 – Tied	UD Arena (12,558); Dayton, OH
March 20, 2026*; 8:25 p.m., TNT	(16 S)	vs. (1 S) No. 4 Florida; First round	L 55–114	19–18	16 – Joseph	8 – Diallo	2 – Williams	Benchmark International Arena (20,112); Tampa, FL
*Non-conference game. ^{#}Rankings from AP Poll. (#) Tournament seedings in parentheses. S=South. All times are in Central.
