= 2025–26 Alcorn State Braves basketball team =

American college basketball season

2025–26 Alcorn State Braves basketball
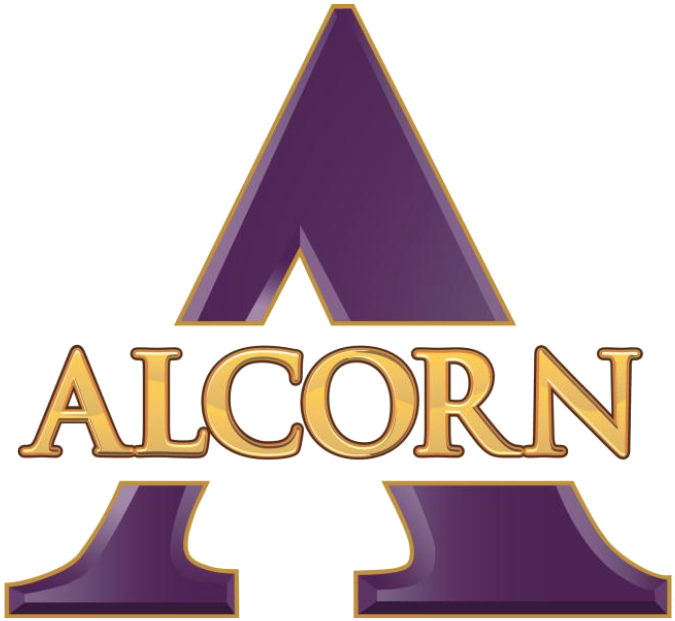
- Conference: Southwestern Athletic Conference
- Record: 9–23 (7–11 SWAC)
- Head coach: Jake Morton (1st season)
- Assistant coaches: Adam Braswell; Devon Smith; Darryl Prue
- Home arena: Davey Whitney Complex

2025–26 SWAC men's basketball standings
	Conf.				Overall
Team	W		L	PCT	W		L	PCT
Bethune–Cookman	14	–	4	.778	17	–	15	.531
Florida A&M	11	–	7	.611	15	–	15	.500
Southern	11	–	7	.611	15	–	16	.484
Texas Southern	10	–	8	.556	12	–	17	.414
Alabama A&M	10	–	8	.556	17	–	14	.548
Arkansas–Pine Bluff	10	–	8	.556	13	–	18	.419
Jackson State	10	–	8	.556	12	–	21	.364
Prairie View A&M	9	–	9	.500	16	–	17	.485
Grambling State	7	–	11	.389	14	–	19	.424
Alabama State	7	–	11	.389	10	–	22	.313
Alcorn State	7	–	11	.389	9	–	23	.281
Mississippi Valley State	2	–	16	.111	3	–	30	.091
† 2026 SWAC tournament winner As of March 11, 2026

The 2025–26 Alcorn State Braves basketball team represented Alcorn State University during the 2025–26 NCAA Division I men's basketball season. The Braves, led by first-year head coach Jake Morton, played their home games at the Davey Whitney Complex in Lorman, Mississippi as members of the Southwestern Athletic Conference (SWAC).

== Previous season ==
The Braves finished the 2024–25 season 11–21, 11–7 in SWAC play, to finish in sixth place. In the SWAC tournament, they were defeated in the quarterfinal round by Bethune–Cookman.

== Preseason ==
On October 8, 2025, the SWAC released their preseason polls. Alcorn State was picked to finish tenth in the conference.

=== Preseason rankings ===
SWAC Preseason Poll
Place	Team	Votes
1	Bethune–Cookman	232 (12)
2	Southern	214 (5)
3	Jackson State	208 (1)
4	Alabama State	183 (3)
5	Texas Southern	182
6	Alabama A&M	163
7	Grambling State	151
8	Florida A&M	115
9	Prairie View A&M	99
10	Alcorn State	74
11	Arkansas–Pine Bluff	70 (1)
12	Mississippi Valley State	25
(#) first-place votes

=== Preseason All-SWAC Teams ===
No players were named to the First or Second Preseason All-SWAC Teams.

== Roster ==
2025–26 Alcorn State Braves men's basketball team
Players
Coaches

Pos.	#	Name	Height	Weight	Year	Previous school	Hometown
G	0	Shane Lancaster	6 ft 4 in (1.93 m)	203 lb (92 kg)	Jr	Miami Dade College	Bowie, MD
G	1	Jameel Morris	6 ft 1 in (1.85 m)	186 lb (84 kg)	Jr	Fairleigh Dickinson	Willingboro, NJ
F	2	Jeremy Ellis	6 ft 8 in (2.03 m)	197 lb (89 kg)	Jr	-	Hamilton, NJ
G	3	Davian Williams	6 ft 0 in (1.83 m)	170 lb (77 kg)	So	Vicksburg HS	Vicksburg, MS
G	4	Bryson Calamese	6 ft 0 in (1.83 m)	190 lb (86 kg)	Jr	Iowa Western Community College	Little Rock, AR
F	6	William Henderson	6 ft 10 in (2.08 m)	200 lb (91 kg)	Jr	Lane College	Richmond, VA
F	7	Nick Woodard	6 ft 7 in (2.01 m)	210 lb (95 kg)	Sr	Stony Brook	Macon, GA
F	8	Tycen McDaniels	6 ft 8 in (2.03 m)	190 lb (86 kg)	Jr	Itawamba CC	Columbus, GA
G	10	Alex Hawkins	6 ft 4 in (1.93 m)	190 lb (86 kg)	Jr	Lawson State CC	Frederick, MD
F	12	Omari Hamilton	6 ft 7 in (2.01 m)	205 lb (93 kg)	Sr	Chattahoochee Valley CC	Atlanta, GA
G/F	22	Mike Jones	6 ft 6 in (1.98 m)	218 lb (99 kg)	Fr	Chicago Prep Academy	Rockford, IL
G	30	Travis Roberts	6 ft 6 in (1.98 m)	200 lb (91 kg)	Sr	Marist	Waldorf, MD

Head coach

- Jake Morton (Miami (FL))

Assistant coach(es)

- Adam Braswell (Morgan State)
- Devon Smith (Ohio State)
- Darryl Prue

Legend

- (C) Team captain
- (S) Suspended
- (I) Ineligible
- (W) Walk-on
- Injured
- Current redshirt

Roster
Last update: December 8, 2025

== Schedule and results ==
Date time, TV	Rank^{#}	Opponent^{#}	Result	Record	High points	High rebounds	High assists	Site (attendance) city, state
Non-conference regular season
November 4, 2025*; 6:00 p.m., ACCNX		at Florida State	L 76–108	0–1	16 – Woodard	6 – Woodard	3 – Woodard	Tucker Civic Center (5,397); Tallahassee, FL
November 6, 2025*; 7:00 p.m., ESPN+		at South Alabama	L 70–76	0–2	25 – Lancaster	7 – Woodard	3 – Woodard	Mitchell Center (1,654); Mobile, AL
November 8, 2025*; 11:00 a.m., Peacock		at Minnesota	L 50–95	0–3	9 – Henderson	4 – Hamilton	3 – Williams	The Barn (7,166); Minneapolis, MN
November 11, 2025*; 6:00 p.m., B1G+		at Maryland	L 64–84	0–4	22 – Morris	5 – Jones	5 – Jones	XFINITY Center (10,461); College Park, MD
November 13, 2025*; 6:00 p.m., ESPN+		at Howard	L 64–72	0–5	14 – Lancaster	7 – McDaniels	2 – Morris	Burr Gymnasium (1,891); Washington, DC
November 18, 2025*; 7:00 p.m., SECN+		at LSU	L 81–107	0–6	21 – Williams	9 – Roberts	3 – Calamese	Pete Maravich Center (6,291); Baton Rouge, LA
November 23, 2025*; 1:00 p.m., SECN+		at Oklahoma	L 53–72	0–7	12 – McDaniels	8 – Jones	2 – Morris	Lloyd Noble Center (4,746); Norman, OK
November 28, 2025*; 1:00 p.m.		vs. Indiana State; Louisiana Tech MTE	W 81–74	1–7	18 – Morris	10 – McDaniels	3 – Woodard	Thomas Assembly Center (160); Ruston, LA
November 29, 2025*; 12:00 p.m., ESPN+		at Louisiana Tech; Louisiana Tech MTE	L 58–83	1–8	11 – McDaniels	6 – Morris	3 – Morris	Thomas Assembly Center (1,938); Ruston, LA
December 3, 2025*; 7:00 p.m., ESPN+		at No. 10 Iowa State	L 68–132	1–9	17 – Morris	6 – Jones	5 – Calamese	Hilton Coliseum (13,429); Ames, IA
December 19, 2025*; 7:00 p.m., ESPN+		at Baylor	L 56–113	1–10	17 – Lancaster	4 – Tied	3 – Calamese	Foster Pavilion (7,019); Waco, TX
December 29, 2025*; 7:00 p.m., SECN		at Ole Miss	L 43–79	1–11	17 – McDaniels	6 – McDaniels	3 – Woodard	SJB Pavilion (8,362); Oxford, MS
SWAC regular season
January 3, 2026; 3:00 p.m.		at Jackson State	L 86–89	1–12 (0–1)	24 – Williams	7 – Woodard	5 – Morris	Williams Assembly Center (2,220); Jackson, MS
January 10, 2026; 4:00 p.m.		at Alabama A&M	W 64–62	2–12 (1–1)	21 – Morris	8 – Morris	4 – Morris	Alabama A&M Events Center (2,312); Huntsville, AL
January 12, 2026; 6:00 p.m.		at Alabama State	L 66–81	2–13 (1–2)	15 – Lancaster	8 – McDaniels	4 – Morris	Dunn–Oliver Acadome (1,101); Montgomery, AL
January 17, 2026; 3:00 p.m.		Texas Southern	L 71–72	2–14 (1–3)	15 – Williams	9 – McDaniels	4 – Morris	Davey Whitney Complex; Lorman, MS
January 19, 2026; 2:00 p.m.		Prairie View A&M	W 76–75	3–14 (2–3)	20 – Hamilton	9 – Hamilton	7 – Morris	Davey Whitney Complex (454); Lorman, MS
January 24, 2026; 5:00 p.m.		at Florida A&M	L 58–66	3–15 (2–4)	20 – McDaniels	9 – McDaniels	3 – Tied	Al Lawson Center (1,101); Tallahassee, FL
January 26, 2026; 6:00 p.m.		at Bethune–Cookman	L 73–82	3–16 (2–5)	16 – Lancaster	8 – McDaniels	3 – Tied	Moore Gymnasium (912); Daytona Beach, FL
January 31, 2026; 3:00 p.m.		Southern	W 78–73	4–16 (3–5)	22 – Lancaster	7 – McDaniels	5 – Lancaster	Davey Whitney Complex (994); Lorman, MS
February 2, 2026; 7:00 p.m.		Grambling State	L 50–74	4–17 (3–6)	15 – Morris	8 – Woodard	3 – Lancaster	Davey Whitney Complex (862); Lorman, MS
February 7, 2026; 5:30 p.m.		at Arkansas–Pine Bluff	L 77–84	4–18 (3–7)	18 – Williams	5 – McDaniels	6 – Morris	H.O. Clemmons Arena (2,173); Pine Bluff, AR
February 9, 2026; 7:00 p.m.		at Mississippi Valley State	W 74–66	5–18 (4–7)	16 – Woodard	4 – Tied	5 – Lancaster	Harrison HPER Complex (219); Itta Bena, MS
February 14, 2026; 3:00 p.m.		Bethune–Cookman	W 57–55	6–18 (5–7)	11 – Hamilton	6 – McDaniels	2 – Tied	Davey Whitney Complex (695); Lorman, MS
February 16, 2026; 7:00 p.m.		Florida A&M	L 78–86	6–19 (5–8)	15 – Morris	7 – Woodard	7 – Morris	Davey Whitney Complex (508); Lorman, MS
February 21, 2026; 3:00 p.m.		Jackson State	W 83–65	7–19 (6–8)	25 – McDaniels	14 – McDaniels	3 – Lancaster	Davey Whitney Complex (1,201); Lorman, MS
February 26, 2026; 7:00 p.m.		at Texas Southern	L 87–92	7–20 (6–9)	26 – McDaniels	13 – McDaniels	4 – Lancaster	H&PE Arena (3,221); Houston, TX
February 28, 2026; 4:30 p.m.		at Prairie View A&M	L 51–72	7–21 (6–10)	13 – Hamilton	10 – Hamilton	2 – McDaniels	William Nicks Building (965); Prairie View, TX
March 3, 2026; 8:00 p.m.		Mississippi Valley State	W 67–64	8–21 (7–10)	29 – McDaniels	7 – Hamilton	4 – Lancaster	Davey Whitney Complex (515); Lorman, MS
March 5, 2026; 8:00 p.m.		Arkansas–Pine Bluff	L 48–83	8–22 (7–11)	16 – McDaniels	10 – Hamilton	5 – Lancaster	Davey Whitney Complex (757); Lorman, MS
SWAC tournament
March 9, 2026; 1:00 pm, ESPN+	(11)	vs. (10) Alabama State; First round	W 77–65	9–22	22 – Tied	9 – McDaniels	5 – Lancaster	Gateway Center Arena (745); College Park, GA
March 10, 2026; 1:00 pm, ESPN+	(11)	vs. (8) Prairie View A&M; Second round	L 56–65	9–23	24 – Morris	11 – McDaniels	2 – Morris	Gateway Center Arena (628); College Park, GA
*Non-conference game. ^{#}Rankings from AP poll. (#) Tournament seedings in parentheses. All times are in Central.
