= 2025–26 Texas Southern Tigers basketball team =

American college basketball season

2025–26 Texas Southern Tigers basketball
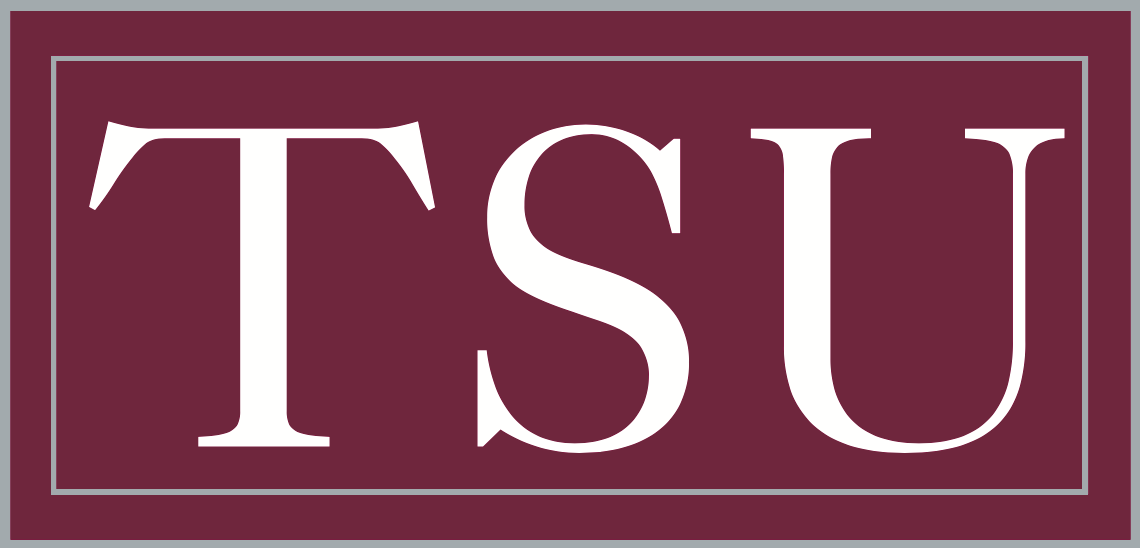
- Conference: Southwestern Athletic Conference
- Record: 12–18 (10–8 SWAC)
- Head coach: Johnny Jones (8th season)
- Assistant coaches: Shyrone Chatman; Otis Hughley Jr.; John Jones; Charlie Hurd
- Home arena: Health and Physical Education Arena

2025–26 SWAC men's basketball standings
	Conf.				Overall
Team	W		L	PCT	W		L	PCT
Bethune–Cookman	14	–	4	.778	17	–	15	.531
Florida A&M	11	–	7	.611	15	–	15	.500
Southern	11	–	7	.611	16	–	16	.500
Texas Southern	10	–	8	.556	12	–	18	.400
Alabama A&M	10	–	8	.556	18	–	14	.563
Arkansas–Pine Bluff	10	–	8	.556	13	–	19	.406
Jackson State	10	–	8	.556	12	–	21	.364
Prairie View A&M	9	–	9	.500	16	–	17	.485
Grambling State	7	–	11	.389	14	–	19	.424
Alabama State	7	–	11	.389	10	–	22	.313
Alcorn State	7	–	11	.389	9	–	23	.281
Mississippi Valley State	2	–	16	.111	3	–	30	.091
† 2026 SWAC tournament winner As of March 12, 2026

The 2025–26 Texas Southern Tigers basketball team represented Texas Southern University during the 2025–26 NCAA Division I men's basketball season. The Tigers, led by eighth-year head coach Johnny Jones, played their home games at the Health and Physical Education Arena in Houston, Texas as members of the Southwestern Athletic Conference.

== Previous season ==
The Tigers finished the 2024–25 season 15–17, 12–6 in SWAC play, to finish in a tie for fourth place. They were defeated by eventual tournament champions Alabama State in the quarterfinals of the SWAC tournament.

== Preseason ==
On October 8, 2025, the SWAC released their preseason polls. Texas Southern was picked to finish fifth in the conference.

=== Preseason rankings ===
SWAC Preseason Poll
Place	Team	Votes
1	Bethune–Cookman	232 (12)
2	Southern	214 (5)
3	Jackson State	208 (1)
4	Alabama State	183 (3)
5	Texas Southern	182
6	Alabama A&M	163
7	Grambling State	151
8	Florida A&M	115
9	Prairie View A&M	99
10	Alcorn State	74
11	Arkansas–Pine Bluff	70 (1)
12	Mississippi Valley State	25
(#) first-place votes

=== Preseason All-SWAC Teams ===
Preseason All-SWAC Team
Team	Player	Year	Position
Second	Zaire Hayes	Graduate Student	Guard

== Roster ==
2025–26 Texas Southern Tigers men's basketball team
Players
Coaches

Pos.	#	Name	Height	Weight	Year	Previous school	Hometown
G	0	Alex Anderson	6 ft 6 in (1.98 m)	200 lb (91 kg)	Sr	Incarnate Word	Memphis, Tennessee
F	1	Oumar Koureissi (S)	6 ft 11 in (2.11 m)	220 lb (100 kg)	Sr	Nicholls	Harlem, New York
F	2	Troy Hupstead	6 ft 7 in (2.01 m)	230 lb (104 kg)	Sr	UT Arlington	Mount Vernon, New York
G	3	Bryce Roberts	6 ft 1 in (1.85 m)	180 lb (82 kg)	Sr	UT Tyler	Bossier City, Louisiana
F	4	Josh Farmer	6 ft 10 in (2.08 m)	200 lb (91 kg)	Sr	UTSA	Houston, Texas
G	5	Jaylen Wysinger	6 ft 0 in (1.83 m)	170 lb (77 kg)	GS	Paris Junior College	Houston, Texas
G	7	Zaire Hayes	6 ft 2 in (1.88 m)	185 lb (84 kg)	GS	Northwest Kansas Tech	Houston, Texas
F	8	Anthony "LJ" Andrews	6 ft 7 in (2.01 m)	215 lb (98 kg)	Fr	Bellaire High School	Houston, Texas
G	9	Ahmed Nedal Abdelrahman	6 ft 8 in (2.03 m)	210 lb (95 kg)	Fr	NBA Academy Africa	Cairo, Egypt
G	11	Cameron Patterson	6 ft 5 in (1.96 m)	180 lb (82 kg)	RS Fr	San Jose State	Houston, Texas
G	12	Zytarious Mortle	6 ft 2 in (1.88 m)	199 lb (90 kg)	Sr	Sunrise Christian Academy	Alexandria, Louisiana
G	14	Kolby Granger	6 ft 5 in (1.96 m)	195 lb (88 kg)	GS	Ridge Point High School	Missouri City, Texas
F	23	Duane Posey	6 ft 7 in (2.01 m)	215 lb (98 kg)	GS	Northwestern State	Memphis, Tennessee
G	24	Jordan Hamilton	6 ft 6 in (1.98 m)	225 lb (102 kg)	Sr	SIU Edwardsville	Memphis, Tennessee
G	32	Kehlin Farooq	6 ft 6 in (1.98 m)	196 lb (89 kg)	GS	Hampton	Houston, Texas
C	34	Jordan Gorecki	6 ft 10 in (2.08 m)	260 lb (118 kg)	Sr	Northern Illinois	Markham, Ontario
F	35	Josh Akpovwa	6 ft 9 in (2.06 m)	270 lb (122 kg)	Jr	Incarnate Word	Houston, Texas

Head coach

- Johnny Jones (LSU)

Assistant coach(es)

- Shyrone Chatman (Memphis)
- Otis Hughley Jr. (West Alabama)
- John Jones (Texas Southern)
- Charlie Hurd (Texas A&M–Corpus Christi)

Legend

- (C) Team captain
- (S) Suspended
- (I) Ineligible
- (W) Walk-on
- Injured
- Current redshirt

Roster
Last update: December 16, 2025

== Schedule and results ==
Date time, TV	Rank^{#}	Opponent^{#}	Result	Record	High points	High rebounds	High assists	Site (attendance) city, state
Non-conference regular season
November 3, 2025*; 8:00 pm, ESPN+		at No. 21 Gonzaga	L 43–98	0–1	8 – Tied	4 – Granger	3 – Wysinger	McCarthey Athletic Center (6,000); Spokane, WA
November 6, 2025*; 7:00 pm, SECN+		at Texas A&M	L 70–104	0–2	18 – Patterson	9 – Hupstead	3 – Tied	Reed Arena (6,821); College Station, TX
November 12, 2025*; 7:00 pm		Samford	L 90–93 ^{OT}	0–3	25 – Hupstead	11 – Posey	2 – Wysinger	H&PE Arena (275); Houston, TX
November 15, 2025*; 4:00 pm, ESPN+		at Texas State	L 67–77	0−4	19 – Hupstead	9 – Hupstead	3 – Patterson	Strahan Arena (1,236); San Marcos, TX
November 20, 2025*; 6:00 pm, ESPN+		at Vanderbilt	L 74-109	0−5	12 – Tied	5 – Mortle	1 – Tied	Memorial Gymnasium (5,673); Nashville, TN
November 26, 2025*; 6:30 pm		Biblical Studies	W 102–44	1–5	18 – Nedal Abdelrahman	11 – Hupstead	5 – Mortle	H&PE Arena (308); Houston, TX
December 6, 2025*; 4:00 pm		Sam Houston	L 70–82	1–6	18 – Hupstead	13 – Hupstead	4 – Roberts	H&PE Arena (567); Houston, TX
December 14, 2025*; 12:00 pm, BTN		at Minnesota	L 53–89	1–7	11 – Anderson	5 – Hupstead	3 – Anderson	Williams Arena (8,254); Minneapolis, MN
December 17, 2025*; 6:00 pm, ACCNX		at NC State	L 72–108	1–8	17 – Hayes	9 – Hupstead	4 – Anderson	Reynolds Coliseum (5,500); Raleigh, NC
December 22, 2025*; 4:00 pm		Abilene Christian	L 68–75	1–9	16 – Tied	6 – Mortle	2 – Tied	H&PE Arena (639); Houston, TX
December 30, 2025*; 6:30 pm		Huston–Tillotson	W 80–56	2–9	30 – Hupstead	17 – Hupstead	4 – Mortle	H&PE Arena (823); Houston, TX
SWAC regular season
January 3, 2026; 5:00 pm		at Southern	L 73–84	2–10 (0–1)	18 – Anderson	11 – Hupstead	5 – Roberts	F. G. Clark Center (4,357); Baton Rouge, LA
January 5, 2026; 6:30 pm		at Grambling State	L 67–84	2–11 (0–2)	25 – Hayes	6 – Hupstead	2 – Wysinger	Hobdy Assembly Center (1,756); Grambling, LA
January 10, 2026; 4:00 pm		Arkansas–Pine Bluff	L 66–74	2–12 (0–3)	16 – Anderson	14 – Hupstead	3 – Anderson	H&PE Arena (486); Houston, TX
January 12, 2026; 7:00 pm		Mississippi Valley State	W 84–51	3–12 (1–3)	22 – Mortle	10 – Hupstead	5 – Anderson	H&PE Arena (1,803); Houston, TX
January 17, 2026; 3:00 pm		at Alcorn State	W 72–71	4–12 (2–3)	20 – Roberts	7 – Hupstead	3 – Hupstead	Davey Whitney Complex; Lorman, MS
January 19, 2026; 7:00 pm		at Jackson State	L 89–94	4–13 (2–4)	26 – Roberts	15 – Hupstead	5 – Hayes	Williams Assembly Center (654); Jackson, MS
January 24, 2026; 2:30 pm		Alabama A&M	W 89–74	5–13 (3–4)	23 – Wysinger	9 – Posey	5 – Anderson	H&PE Arena (1,027); Houston, TX
January 27, 2026; 1:00 pm		Alabama State	W 96–64	6–13 (4–4)	17 – Hayes	16 – Hupstead	4 – Tied	H&PE Arena (806); Houston, TX
January 31, 2026; 4:30 pm		at Prairie View A&M	L 78–85	6–14 (4–5)	19 – Hupstead	11 – Hupstead	1 – Tied	William Nicks Building (3,040); Prairie View, TX
February 7, 2026; 5:00 p.m.		at Florida A&M	W 62–57	7–14 (5–5)	24 – Hupstead	9 – Hupstead	3 – Wysinger	Al Lawson Center (1,080); Tallahassee, FL
February 9, 2026; 6:00 pm		at Bethune–Cookman	L 69–79 ^{OT}	7–15 (5–6)	16 – Roberts	15 – Hupstead	3 – Wysinger	Moore Gymnasium; Daytona Beach, FL
February 14, 2026; 4:00 pm		Grambling State	L 79–82	8–15 (6–6)	17 – Tied	6 – Gorecki	6 – Wysinger	H&PE Arena (1,477); Houston, TX
February 16, 2026; 7:00 pm		Southern	W 74–73	9–15 (7–6)	28 – Wysinger	11 – Mortle	4 – Wysinger	H&PE Arena (1,539); Houston, TX
February 19, 2026; 8:00 pm		at Arkansas–Pine Bluff	W 83–64	10–15 (8–6)	25 – Wysinger	10 – Hupstead	7 – Wysinger	H.O. Clemmons Arena (2,145); Pine Bluff, AR
February 21, 2026; 5:00 pm		at Mississippi Valley State	L 71–72	10–16 (8–7)	17 – Posey	5 – Roberts	3 – Wysinger	Harrison HPER Complex (1,012); Itaa Bena, MS
February 26, 2026; 7:00 pm		Alcorn State	W 92–87 ^{OT}	11–16 (9–7)	33 – Mortle	15 – Posey	6 – Mortle	H&PE Arena (3,221); Houston, TX
February 28, 2026; 4:00 pm		Jackson State	W 82–57	12–16 (10–7)	17 – Hayes	9 – Posey	4 – Anderson	H&PE Arena (1,567); Houston, TX
March 5, 2026; 7:00 pm		Prairie View A&M	L 59–70	12–17 (10–8)	16 – Mortle	12 – Posey	3 – Gorecki	H&PE Arena (2,364); Houston, TX
SWAC tournament
March 12, 2026; 1:00 p.m., ESPN+	(4)	vs. (5) Alabama A&M; Quarterfinals	L 74–85 ^{OT}	12–18	16 – Wysinger	11 – Anderson	3 – Tied	Gateway Center Arena (1,028); College Park, GA
*Non-conference game. ^{#}Rankings from AP Poll. (#) Tournament seedings in parentheses. All times are in Central.
