= 2026 SWAC men's basketball tournament =

American college basketball tournament

- Classification: Division I
- Season: 2025–26
- Teams: 12
- Site: Gateway Center Arena; College Park, Georgia
- Champions: Prairie View A&M (3rd title)
- Winning coach: Byron Smith (2nd title)
- MVP: Dontae Horne (Prairie View A&M)
- Television: ESPN+ and ESPNU

2025–26 SWAC men's basketball standings
	Conf.				Overall
Team	W		L	PCT	W		L	PCT
Bethune–Cookman	14	–	4	.778	17	–	15	.531
Florida A&M	11	–	7	.611	15	–	16	.484
Southern	11	–	7	.611	17	–	17	.500
Texas Southern	10	–	8	.556	12	–	18	.400
Alabama A&M	10	–	8	.556	18	–	15	.545
Arkansas–Pine Bluff	10	–	8	.556	13	–	19	.406
Jackson State	10	–	8	.556	12	–	21	.364
Prairie View A&M †	9	–	9	.500	19	–	18	.514
Grambling State	7	–	11	.389	14	–	19	.424
Alabama State	7	–	11	.389	10	–	22	.313
Alcorn State	7	–	11	.389	9	–	23	.281
Mississippi Valley State	2	–	16	.111	3	–	30	.091
† 2026 SWAC tournament winner

The 2026 SWAC Men's Basketball Tournament was the postseason men's basketball tournament for the 2025–26 season in the Southwestern Athletic Conference (SWAC). The tournament was held from March 9–14, 2026 at Gateway Center Arena in College Park, Georgia. The tournament winner, Prairie View A&M, received the conference's automatic invitation to the 2026 NCAA Division I Men's Basketball Tournament.

== Seeds ==
Teams were seeded by record within the conference, with a tie–breaker system to seed teams with identical conference records. All 12 teams in the conference participated in the tournament.

Seed	School	Conference	Tiebreaker 1	Tiebreaker 2	Tiebreaker 3
1	Bethune–Cookman	14–4			
2	Florida A&M	11–7	2–0 vs. Southern		
3	Southern	11–7	0–2 vs. Florida A&M		
4	Texas Southern	10–8	3–2 vs. AAMU/UAPB/JSU		
5	Alabama A&M	10–8	2–2 vs. TXSO/UAPB/JSU	2–1 vs. UAPB/JSU	
6	Arkansas–Pine Bluff	10–8	3–3 vs. TXSO/AAMU/JSU	2–2 vs. AAMU/JSU	+18 point diff. in season split vs. JSU
7	Jackson State	10–8	2–3 vs. TXSO/AAMU/JSU	1–2 vs. AAMU/UAPB	-18 point diff. in season split vs. UAPB
8	Prairie View A&M	9–9			
9	Grambling State	7–11	3–0 vs. Alabama State/Alcorn State		
10	Alabama State	7–11	1–2 vs. Grambling State/Alcorn State	1-0 vs. Alcorn State	
11	Alcorn State	7–11	0–2 vs. Grambling State/Alabama State	0-1 vs. Alabama State	
12	Mississippi Valley State	2–16			

== Schedule ==
Game	Time*	Matchup^{#}	Score	Television
First round – Monday, March 9
1	2:00 p.m.	No. 10 Alabama State vs. No. 11 Alcorn State	65–77	ESPN+
2	8:30 p.m.	No. 9 Grambling State vs. No. 12 Mississippi Valley State	77–52	ESPN+
Second round – Tuesday, March 10
3	2:00 p.m.	No. 8 Prairie View A&M vs. No. 11 Alcorn State	65–56	ESPN+
4	8:30 p.m.	No. 7 Jackson State vs. No. 9 Grambling State	68–65	ESPN+
Quarterfinals – Wednesday, March 11
5	2:00 p.m.	No. 1 Bethune–Cookman vs. No. 8 Prairie View A&M	67–71	ESPN+
6	8:30 p.m.	No. 2 Florida A&M vs. No. 7 Jackson State	70–60	ESPN+
Quarterfinals – Thursday, March 12
7	2:00 p.m.	No. 4 Texas Southern vs. No. 5 Alabama A&M	74–85^{OT}	ESPN+
8	8:30 p.m.	No. 3 Southern vs. No. 6 Arkansas–Pine Bluff	84–81	ESPN+
Semifinals – Friday, March 13
9	2:00 p.m.	No. 5 Alabama A&M vs. No. 8 Prairie View A&M	55–74	ESPN+
10	8:30 p.m.	No. 2 Florida A&M vs. No. 3 Southern	70–73	ESPN+
Championship – Saturday, March 14
11	7:30 p.m.	No. 3 Southern vs. No. 8 Prairie View A&M	66–72	ESPNU
*Game times in EST. #-Rankings denote tournament seeding.

== Bracket ==
First round March 9, 2026; ESPN+
10	Alabama State	65
11	Alcorn State	77
9	Grambling State	77
12	Mississippi Valley State	52

Second round March 10, 2026; ESPN+
8	Prairie View A&M	65
11	Alcorn State	56
7	Jackson State	68
9	Grambling State	65

Quarterfinals; March 11–12, 2026; ESPN+
1	Bethune–Cookman	67
8	Prairie View A&M	71
4	Texas Southern	74
5	Alabama A&M	85*
2	Florida A&M	70
7	Jackson State	60
3	Southern	84
6	Arkansas–Pine Bluff	81

Semifinals; March 13, 2026; ESPN+
8	Prairie View A&M	74
5	Alabama A&M	55
2	Florida A&M	70
3	Southern	73

Championship; March 14, 2026; ESPNU
8	Prairie View A&M	72
3	Southern	66

* denotes overtime period

== Awards and honors ==
=== All-Tournament team ===
Player	Team
Koron Davis	Alabama A&M
Tyler Shirley	Florida A&M
Michael Jacobs	Southern
Lance Williams	Prairie View A&M
**Dontae Horne**	Prairie View A&M

MVP in bold
