= 2025–26 Alabama State Hornets basketball team =

American college basketball season

2025–26 Alabama State Hornets basketball
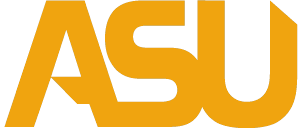
- Conference: Southwestern Athletic Conference
- Record: 10–22 (7–11 SWAC)
- Head coach: Tony Madlock (4th season)
- Assistant coaches: Tyrone Levett; Sidney Ball; Michael Irokansi; Damien Madison
- Home arena: Dunn–Oliver Acadome

2025–26 SWAC men's basketball standings
	Conf.				Overall
Team	W		L	PCT	W		L	PCT
Bethune–Cookman	14	–	4	.778	17	–	15	.531
Florida A&M	11	–	7	.611	15	–	16	.484
Southern	11	–	7	.611	17	–	17	.500
Texas Southern	10	–	8	.556	12	–	18	.400
Alabama A&M	10	–	8	.556	18	–	15	.545
Arkansas–Pine Bluff	10	–	8	.556	13	–	19	.406
Jackson State	10	–	8	.556	12	–	21	.364
Prairie View A&M †	9	–	9	.500	19	–	18	.514
Grambling State	7	–	11	.389	14	–	19	.424
Alabama State	7	–	11	.389	10	–	22	.313
Alcorn State	7	–	11	.389	9	–	23	.281
Mississippi Valley State	2	–	16	.111	3	–	30	.091
† 2026 SWAC tournament winner

The 2025–26 Alabama State Hornets basketball team represented Alabama State University during the 2025–26 NCAA Division I men's basketball season. The Hornets, led by fourth-year head coach Tony Madlock, played their home games at the Dunn-Oliver Acadome in Montgomery, Alabama as members of the Southwestern Athletic Conference.

== Previous season ==
The Hornets finished the 2024-25 season 20-16 and 12-6 in SWAC play to tie for fourth place. Alabama State defeated Jackson State in the SWAC tournament to earn an appearance in the NCAA tournament as a 16 seed. The Hornets won their first ever NCAA tournament game over Saint Francis in the First Four before falling to Auburn in the round of 64.

== Preseason ==
On October 8, 2025, the SWAC released their preseason polls. Alabama State was picked to finish fourth in the conference, while receiving three first-place votes.

=== Preseason rankings ===
SWAC Preseason Poll
Place	Team	Votes
1	Bethune–Cookman	232 (12)
2	Southern	214 (5)
3	Jackson State	208 (1)
4	Alabama State	183 (3)
5	Texas Southern	182
6	Alabama A&M	163
7	Grambling State	151
8	Florida A&M	115
9	Prairie View A&M	99
10	Alcorn State	74
11	Arkansas–Pine Bluff	70 (1)
12	Mississippi Valley State	25
(#) first-place votes

=== Preseason All-SWAC Teams ===
Preseason All-SWAC Team
Team	Player	Year	Position
Second	Micah Simpson	Senior	Guard

== Roster ==
2025–26 Alabama State Hornets men's basketball team
Players
Coaches

Pos.	#	Name	Height	Weight	Year	Previous school	Hometown
G	0	Tyler Byrd	6 ft 3 in (1.91 m)	190 lb (86 kg)	Jr	Northeast Mississippi CC	Memphis, TN
G/F	1	Damarien Yates	6 ft 7 in (2.01 m)	220 lb (100 kg)	Jr	Memphis	Somerville, TN
G	2	Micah Simpson	6 ft 2 in (1.88 m)	190 lb (86 kg)	Sr	Walters State CC	Morristown, TN
G	3	Trey Miller	6 ft 2 in (1.88 m)	180 lb (82 kg)	Sr	UT Rio Grande Valley	Houston, TX
C	4	Mario Andrews	6 ft 6 in (1.98 m)	220 lb (100 kg)	Sr	Snead State CC	Independence, LA
G	5	Tyler Mack	6 ft 5 in (1.96 m)	185 lb (84 kg)	GS	Maryland Eastern Shore	Warren, MI
G	7	Damarion Bonds	6 ft 6 in (1.98 m)	185 lb (84 kg)	Jr	Central Michigan	Pontiac, MI
G	10	Damion Cox, Jr	6 ft 2 in (1.88 m)	160 lb (73 kg)	Fr	Central HS	Memphis, TN
G	11	Cameron Palesse	6 ft 5 in (1.96 m)	205 lb (93 kg)	GS	Canisius	Waukesha, WI
F	12	Tyler Mason	6 ft 9 in (2.06 m)	225 lb (102 kg)	Jr	Howard College	Stafford, VA
G	13	Jordon Marshall	6 ft 2 in (1.88 m)	200 lb (91 kg)	Sr	Southern Union CC	Covington, GA
G	20	Asjon Anderson	6 ft 2 in (1.88 m)	175 lb (79 kg)	Sr	Queens	Tacoma, WA
F	22	Kevin Alabi	6 ft 7 in (2.01 m)	210 lb (95 kg)	RS Fr	Skyline Prep	Brampton, Canada
F	23	R'Chaun King	6 ft 6 in (1.98 m)	225 lb (102 kg)	RS Fr	Arkansas State	Memphis, TN
F	24	Jerquarius Stanback	6 ft 9 in (2.06 m)	210 lb (95 kg)	RS Fr	Asheboro HS	Asheboro, NC
F	25	JaSteven Walker	6 ft 10 in (2.08 m)	200 lb (91 kg)	RS Jr	Fayette Ware HS	Oakland, TN

Head coach

- Tony Madlock (Memphis)

Assistant coach(es)

- Tyrone Levett (Alabama State)
- Sidney Ball (UAB)
- Michael Irokansi (Texas Southern)
- Damien Madison

Legend

- (C) Team captain
- (S) Suspended
- (I) Ineligible
- (W) Walk-on
- Injured
- Current redshirt

Roster
Last update: November 29, 2025

== Schedule and results ==
Date time, TV	Rank^{#}	Opponent^{#}	Result	Record	High points	High rebounds	High assists	Site (attendance) city, state
Exhibition
October 31, 2025*		Ecclesia College	W 101-63	-	–	–	–	Dunn–Oliver Acadome; Montgomery, AL
Non-conference regular season
November 7, 2025*; 7:00 p.m., ACCNX		at Florida State	L 64–101	0–1	16 – Anderson	8 – Yates	3 – Miller	Donald L. Tucker Civic Center (6,137); Tallahassee, FL
November 11, 2025*; 6:30 p.m.		at UAB	W 77–74	1–1	20 – Anderson	8 – Byrd	7 – Anderson	Bartow Arena (3,556); Birmingham, AL
November 14, 2025*; 6:00 p.m.		Virginia Lynchburg	W 124–68	2–1	19 – Tied	16 – Andrews	7 – Simpson	Dunn–Oliver Acadome (350); Montgomery, AL
November 17, 2025*; 7:00 p.m.		at Colorado	L 66–94	2–2	15 – Anderson	6 – Tied	6 – Anderson	CU Events Center (5,047); Boulder, CO
November 19, 2025*; 4:00 p.m.		at Air Force	L 64–66	2–3	30 – Simpson	6 – Palesse	2 – Anderson	Clune Arena (1,025); Colorado Springs, CO
November 21, 2025*; 12:00 p.m.		vs. IU Indy; Air Force Classic	W 101–80	3–3	21 – King	6 – Tied	9 – Simpson	Clune Arena; Colorado Springs, CO
November 23, 2025*; 11:00 a.m.		vs. SIU Edwardsville; Air Force Classic	L 68–83	3–4	20 – Simpson	8 – Andrews	4 – Anderson	Clune Arena; Colorado Springs, CO
November 26, 2025*; 7:00 p.m.		at New Mexico	L 87–93	3–5	30 – Anderson	9 – Stanback	4 – Tied	The Pit (12,027); Albuquerque, NM
December 7, 2025*; 2:00 p.m., ESPN+		at UT Martin	L 64–74	3–6	15 – Byrd	6 – Palesse	4 – Anderson	Elam Center (1,166); Martin, TN
December 11, 2025*; 7:00 p.m., SECN+		at Missouri	L 77–85	3–7	23 – Anderson	7 – Stanback	3 – Byrd	Mizzou Arena (7,976); Columbia, MO
December 17, 2025*; 6:00 p.m., ESPN+		at Cincinnati	L 51–88	3–8	13 – Simpson	7 – Tied	3 – Palesse	Fifth Third Arena (7,757); Cincinnati, OH
December 22, 2025*; 7:00 p.m., ESPN+		at Memphis	L 67–88	3–9	16 – Anderson	9 – Yates	3 – Tied	FedEx Forum (9,673); Memphis, TN
December 29, 2025*; 6:30 p.m., SECN+		at Mississippi State	L 56–94	3–10	17 – Anderson	5 – Tied	3 – Anderson	Humphrey Coliseum; Starkville, MS
SWAC regular season
January 3, 2026; 5:00 p.m.		at Mississippi Valley State	W 89-69	4-10 (1-0)	25 – Simpson	11 – Palesse	6 – Anderson	Harrison HPER Complex (348); Itta Bena, MS
January 5, 2026; 5:30 p.m.		at Arkansas–Pine Bluff	L 79-90	4-11 (1-1)	23 – Anderson	7 – King	4 – Tied	K. L. Johnson Complex (648); Pine Bluff, AR
January 10, 2026; 3:00 p.m., ESPNU		Jackson State	L 64-75	4-12 (1-2)	18 – Byrd	11 – Yates	4 – Simpson	Dunn–Oliver Acadome (895); Montgomery, AL
January 12, 2026; 6:00 p.m.		Alcorn State	W 81-66	5-12 (2-2)	23 – Anderson	6 – Tied	3 – Anderson	Dunn–Oliver Acadome (1,101); Montgomery, AL
January 19, 2026; 4:00 p.m.		vs. Alabama A&M	L 69-73	5-13 (2-3)	20 – Stanback	7 – Tied	9 – Simpson	Mitchell Center (2,350); Mobile, AL
January 24, 2026; 4:30 p.m.		at Prairie View A&M	W 95-80	6-13 (3-3)	23 – Simpson	8 – Stanback	6 – Anderson	William Nicks Building (422); Prairie View, TX
January 27, 2025; 1:00 p.m.		at Texas Southern	L 64-96	6-14 (3-4)	29 – Byrd	8 – Byrd	4 – Simpson	H&PE Arena (806); Houston, TX
January 31, 2026; 3:00 p.m.		Bethune–Cookman	L 54-69	6-15 (3-5)	16 – Simpson	6 – Stanback	5 – Palesse	Dunn–Oliver Acadome (1,454); Montgomery, AL
February 2, 2026; 6:00 p.m.		Florida A&M	W 79-66	7-15 (4-5)	17 – Byrd	7 – Palesse	6 – Simpson	Dunn–Oliver Acadome (1,324); Montgomery, AL
February 7, 2026; 4:00 p.m.		at Grambling State	L 47-57	7-16 (4-6)	15 – Simpson	6 – Simpson	3 – Simpson	Fredrick C. Hobdy Assembly Center (1,075); Grambling, LA
February 9, 2026; 6:30 p.m., ESPNU		at Southern	L 68-69	7-17 (4-7)	19 – Simpson	8 – Stanback	4 – Simpson	F. G. Clark Center (5,127); Baton Rouge, LA
February 14, 2026; 3:00 p.m.		Arkansas-Pine Bluff	W 79–61	8–17 (5–7)	19 – Stanback	8 – Walker	7 – Simpson	Dunn–Oliver Acadome (1,433); Montgomery, AL
February 16, 2026; 6:00 p.m.		Mississippi Valley State	W 92–55	9–17 (6–7)	13 – Tied	10 – Stanback	6 – Anderson	Dunn–Oliver Acadome (1,235); Montgomery, AL
February 19, 2026; 5:00 p.m.		at Bethune-Cookman	L 71–82	9–18 (6–8)	21 – Mack	6 – Stanback	5 – Simpson	Moore Gymnasium (878); Daytona Beach, FL
February 21, 2026; 5:00 p.m.		at Florida A&M	L 63–76	9–19 (6–9)	12 – Palesse	9 – Simpson	5 – Simpson	Al Lawson Center (1,501); Tallahassee, FL
February 28, 2026; 4:00 p.m.		at Alabama A&M	W 89–88	10–19 (7–9)	24 – Simpson	7 – Stanback	3 – Simpson	Alabama A&M Events Center (6,569); Huntsville, AL
March 3, 2026; 7:00 p.m.		Southern	L 64–71	10–20 (7–10)	13 – Anderson	8 – Stanback	5 – Simpson	Dunn–Oliver Acadome (1,234); Montgomery, AL
March 5, 2026; 7:00 p.m.		Grambling State	L 63–65	10–21 (7–11)	15 – Simpson	10 – Byrd	3 – Palesse	Dunn–Oliver Acadome (961); Montgomery, AL
SWAC tournament
March 9, 2026; 1:00 pm, ESPN+	(10)	vs. (11) Alcorn State; First round	L 65–77	10–22	16 – Stanback	12 – Stanback	5 – Simpson	Gateway Center Arena (745); College Park, GA
*Non-conference game. ^{#}Rankings from AP Poll. (#) Tournament seedings in parentheses. All times are in Eastern.
