= 2025–26 Florida A&M Rattlers basketball team =

American college basketball season

2025–26 Florida A&M Rattlers basketball

ESPN HBCU Hoops Invitational champions
- Conference: Southwestern Athletic Conference
- Record: 15–16 (11–7 SWAC)
- Head coach: Charlie Ward (1st season)
- Assistant coaches: Jarrod Lazarus; Rob Lewis; Gene Granger
- Home arena: Al Lawson Center

2025–26 SWAC men's basketball standings
| | Conf. | | | | Overall |
| Team | W | | L | PCT | W | | L | PCT |
|---|---|---|---|---|---|---|---|---|
| Bethune–Cookman | 14 | – | 4 | .778 | 17 | – | 15 | .531 |
| Florida A&M | 11 | – | 7 | .611 | 15 | – | 16 | .484 |
| Southern | 11 | – | 7 | .611 | 17 | – | 16 | .515 |
| Texas Southern | 10 | – | 8 | .556 | 12 | – | 18 | .400 |
| Alabama A&M | 10 | – | 8 | .556 | 18 | – | 15 | .545 |
| Arkansas–Pine Bluff | 10 | – | 8 | .556 | 13 | – | 19 | .406 |
| Jackson State | 10 | – | 8 | .556 | 12 | – | 21 | .364 |
| Prairie View A&M | 9 | – | 9 | .500 | 17 | – | 17 | .500 |
| Grambling State | 7 | – | 11 | .389 | 14 | – | 19 | .424 |
| Alabama State | 7 | – | 11 | .389 | 10 | – | 22 | .313 |
| Alcorn State | 7 | – | 11 | .389 | 9 | – | 23 | .281 |
| Mississippi Valley State | 2 | – | 16 | .111 | 3 | – | 30 | .091 |
† 2026 SWAC tournament winner As of March 13, 2026

The 2025–26 Florida A&M Rattlers basketball team represented Florida A&M University during the 2025–26 NCAA Division I men's basketball season. The Rattlers, led by first-year head coach Charlie Ward, played their home games at the Al Lawson Center in Tallahassee, Florida as members of the Southwestern Athletic Conference.

== Previous season ==
The Rattlers finished the 2024–25 season 14–17, 10–8 in SWAC play to finish in seventh place. In the SWAC tournament, they defeated Prairie View A&M in the first round, before falling to Jackson State in the quarterfinals.

On April 11, 2025, it was announced that head coach Patrick Crarey II would be accepting the head coaching position at Grambling State. On April 15, the school announced the hiring of former NBA player and Heisman Trophy winner Charlie Ward as the team's next head coach.

== Preseason ==
On October 8, 2025, the SWAC released their preseason polls. Florida A&M was picked to finish eighth in the conference.

=== Preseason rankings ===
SWAC Preseason Poll
| Place | Team | Votes |
|---|---|---|
| 1 | Bethune–Cookman | 232 (12) |
| 2 | Southern | 214 (5) |
| 3 | Jackson State | 208 (1) |
| 4 | Alabama State | 183 (3) |
| 5 | Texas Southern | 182 |
| 6 | Alabama A&M | 163 |
| 7 | Grambling State | 151 |
| 8 | Florida A&M | 115 |
| 9 | Prairie View A&M | 99 |
| 10 | Alcorn State | 74 |
| 11 | Arkansas–Pine Bluff | 70 (1) |
| 12 | Mississippi Valley State | 25 |
(#) first-place votes

=== Preseason All-SWAC Teams ===
Preseason All-SWAC Team
| Team | Player | Year | Position |
|---|---|---|---|
| Second | Jordan Chatman | Senior | Guard |

== Roster ==
2025–26 Florida A&M Rattlers men's basketball team
Players
Coaches

| Pos. | # | Name | Height | Weight | Year | Hometown |
|---|---|---|---|---|---|---|
| G | 0 | Lenard Taylor Jr. | 6 ft 2 in (1.88 m) | 195 lb (88 kg) | Sr | Baltimore, Maryland |
| G | 1 | Antonio Baker Jr. | 6 ft 3 in (1.91 m) | 190 lb (86 kg) | Jr | Savannah, Georgia |
| G | 2 | Jordan Chatman | 6 ft 4 in (1.93 m) | 210 lb (95 kg) | Sr | Birmingham, Alabama |
| G | 3 | Jaquan Sanders | 6 ft 4 in (1.93 m) | 180 lb (82 kg) | Sr | Far Rockaway, New York |
| G | 4 | Anquan Boldin Jr. | 6 ft 4 in (1.93 m) | 195 lb (88 kg) | Jr | Delray Beach, Florida |
| G | 8 | Amir Rahman | 6 ft 3 in (1.91 m) | 190 lb (86 kg) | Fr | Brentwood, Tennessee |
| F | 10 | Kaleb Washington | 6 ft 8 in (2.03 m) | 210 lb (95 kg) | Sr | Atlanta, Georgia |
| G | 11 | Micah Octave | 6 ft 5 in (1.96 m) | 185 lb (84 kg) | Sr | Boca Raton, Florida |
| G | 12 | Anthony Knowles | 6 ft 0 in (1.83 m) | 195 lb (88 kg) | Fr | Miami, Florida |
| G | 13 | Devere Palmer Jr. | 6 ft 6 in (1.98 m) | 185 lb (84 kg) | Jr | Queens, New York |
| G | 14 | Malcolm Stute | 6 ft 4 in (1.93 m) | 195 lb (88 kg) | RS Fr | Washington, D.C. |
| F | 22 | Tyler Shirley | 6 ft 8 in (2.03 m) | 210 lb (95 kg) | RS Sr | Atlanta, Georgia |
| C | 34 | Miles Ndalama | 6 ft 11 in (2.11 m) | 245 lb (111 kg) | Jr | Ndola, Zambia |
| F | 55 | Tuscan Onuoha | 6 ft 11 in (2.11 m) | 250 lb (113 kg) | RS Jr | Sydney, Australia |

Head coach

- Charlie Ward (Florida State)

Assistant coach(es)

- Jarrod Lazarus (Florida State)
- Rob Lewis (Florida State)
- Gene Granger (Charleston Southern)

Legend

- (C) Team captain
- (S) Suspended
- (I) Ineligible
- (W) Walk-on
- Injured
- Current redshirt

Roster
Last update: November 17, 2025

== Schedule and results ==
| Date time, TV | Rank^{#} | Opponent^{#} | Result | Record | High points | High rebounds | High assists | Site (attendance) city, state |
Non-conference regular season
| November 3, 2025*; 8:50 p.m., ESPN+ | | at South Florida | L 67–102 | 0–1 | 16 – Octave | 8 – Octave | 3 – Boldin Jr. | Yuengling Center (6,531); Tampa, FL |
| November 8, 2025*; 1:00 p.m., SWAC TV | | Kennesaw State | L 72–92 | 0–2 | 16 – Palmer Jr. | 9 – Octave | 3 – Tied | Al Lawson Center (704); Tallahassee, FL |
| November 11, 2025*; 7:00 p.m., ESPN+ | | at UCF | L 60–97 | 0–3 | 12 – Knowles | 6 – Ndalama | 3 – Tied | Addition Financial Arena (10,057); Orlando, FL |
| November 17, 2025*; 6:30 p.m., SECN | | at Georgia | L 57–87 | 0–4 | 16 – Boldin Jr. | 6 – Shirley | 3 – Washington | Stegeman Coliseum (5,971); Athens, GA |
| December 2, 2025*; 7:00 p.m., ESPN+ | | at Jacksonville | L 82–85 ^{OT} | 0–5 | 20 – Sanders | 5 – Tied | 5 – Tied | Swisher Gymnasium (862); Jacksonville, FL |
| December 5, 2025* | | vs. Barber–Scotia; ESPN HBCU Hoops Invitational Semifinals | Canceled | | | | | State Farm Field House; Orlando, FL |
| December 6, 2025*; 3:30 p.m. | | vs. Florida Memorial; ESPN HBCU Hoops Invitational Championship | W 60–58 | 1–5 | 12 – Washington | 12 – Shirley | 3 – Tied | State Farm Field House (348); Orlando, FL |
| December 15, 2025*; 7:00 p.m. | | Albany State | W 93–77 | 2–5 | 25 – Chatman | 6 – Tied | 7 – Baker Jr. | Al Lawson Center (602); Tallahassee, FL |
| December 17, 2025*; 7:00 p.m. | | Jacksonville | W 72–65 | 3–5 | 17 – Baker Jr. | 6 – Tied | 3 – Tied | Al Lawson Center (791); Tallahassee, FL |
| December 19, 2025*; 8:00 p.m., ESPN+ | | at Tarleton | L 54–78 | 3–6 | 17 – Chatman | 5 – Boldin Jr. | 3 – Shirley | EECU Center (811); Stephenville, TX |
| December 21, 2025*; 4:00 p.m., ESPN+ | | at TCU | L 56–80 | 3–7 | 16 – Sanders | 5 – Tied | 5 – Sanders | Schollmaier Arena (4,962); Fort Worth, TX |
| December 28, 2025*; 3:30 p.m., ACCNX | | at Georgia Tech | L 65–89 | 3–8 | 21 – Washington | 5 – Tied | 4 – Sanders | McCamish Pavilion (5,967); Atlanta, GA |
SWAC regular season
| January 3, 2026; 5:30 p.m. | | at Bethune–Cookman | L 83–87 | 3–9 (0–1) | 22 – Sanders | 9 – Octave | 3 – Tied | Moore Gymnasium (864); Daytona Beach, FL |
| January 10, 2026; 7:00 p.m. | | Southern | W 67–59 | 4–9 (1–1) | 17 – Shirley | 8 – Octave | 3 – Tied | Al Lawson Center (1,005); Tallahassee, FL |
| January 12, 2026; 7:00 p.m. | | Grambling State | W 91–84 | 5–9 (2–1) | 24 – Sanders | 8 – Octave | 4 – Tied | Al Lawson Center (901); Tallahassee, FL |
| January 17, 2026; 6:30 p.m. | | at Arkansas–Pine Bluff | W 71–67 | 6–9 (3–1) | 18 – Sanders | 8 – Octave | 7 – Octave | H.O. Clemmons Arena (2,423); Pine Bluff, AR |
| January 19, 2026; 8:00 p.m. | | at Mississippi Valley State | W 62–48 | 7–9 (4–1) | 16 – Sanders | 9 – Baker Jr. | 6 – Sanders | Harrison HPER Complex (167); Itta Bena, MS |
| January 24, 2026; 6:00 p.m. | | Alcorn State | W 66–58 | 8–9 (5–1) | 17 – Ndalama | 6 – Tied | 7 – Sanders | Al Lawson Center (1,101); Tallahassee, FL |
| January 26, 2026; 7:00 p.m. | | Jackson State | L 65–66 | 8–10 (5–2) | 17 – Washington | 5 – Tied | 4 – Sanders | Al Lawson Center (1,005); Tallahassee, FL |
| January 31, 2026; 5:00 p.m. | | at Alabama A&M | L 65–72 | 8–11 (5–3) | 16 – Shirley | 9 – Shirley | 3 – Shirley | AAMU Event Center (4,988); Huntsville, AL |
| February 2, 2026; 7:00 p.m. | | at Alabama State | L 66–79 | 8–12 (5–4) | 22 – Shirley | 13 – Octave | 3 – Sanders | Dunn–Oliver Acadome (1,324); Montgomery, AL |
| February 7, 2026; 6:00 p.m. | | Texas Southern | L 57–62 | 8–13 (5–5) | 18 – Octave | 10 – Octave | 2 – Tied | Al Lawson Center (1,080); Tallahassee, FL |
| February 9, 2026; 7:00 p.m. | | Prairie View A&M | W 100–96 | 9–13 (6–5) | 15 – Washington | 9 – Tied | 7 – Sanders | Al Lawson Center (903); Tallahassee, FL |
| February 14, 2026; 3:30 p.m. | | at Jackson State | L 60–80 | 9–14 (6–6) | 16 – Octave | 6 – Octave | 3 – Tied | Williams Assembly Center (945); Jackson, MS |
| February 16, 2026; 8:00 p.m. | | at Alcorn State | W 86–78 | 10–14 (7–6) | 17 – Sanders | 7 – Chatman | 8 – Sanders | Davey Whitney Complex (508); Lorman, MS |
| February 19, 2026; 8:30 p.m. | | Alabama A&M | L 61–63 | 10–15 (7–7) | 23 – Shirley | 10 – Octave | 7 – Sanders | Al Lawson Center (1,205); Tallahassee, FL |
| February 21, 2026; 6:00 p.m. | | Alabama State | W 76–63 | 11–15 (8–7) | 19 – Baker Jr. | 14 – Octave | 6 – Sanders | Al Lawson Center (1,501); Tallahassee, FL |
| February 26, 2026; 8:30 p.m. | | at Southern | W 82–71 | 12–15 (9–7) | 25 – Shirley | 10 – Chatman | 10 – Sanders | F. G. Clark Center (5,123); Baton Rouge, LA |
| February 28, 2026; 5:30 p.m. | | at Grambling State | W 66–59 | 13–15 (10–7) | 16 – Sanders | 8 – Shirley | 4 – Shirley | Fredrick C. Hobdy Assembly Center (1,577); Grambling, LA |
| March 5, 2026; 7:30 p.m. | | Bethune–Cookman | W 81–77 | 14–15 (11–7) | 18 – Sanders | 11 – Octave | 2 – Tied | Al Lawson Center (3,100); Tallahassee, FL |
SWAC tournament
| March 11, 2026; 8:30 p.m., ESPN+ | (2) | vs. (7) Jackson State; Quarterfinals | W 70–60 | 15–15 | 14 – Baker Jr. | 10 – Octave | 4 – Tied | Gateway Center Arena (1,274); College Park, GA |
| March 13, 2026; 8:30 p.m., ESPN+ | (2) | vs. (3) Southern; Semifinals | L 70–73 | 15–16 | 16 – Shirley | 9 – Octave | 6 – Baker Jr. | Gateway Center Arena (2,782); College Park, GA |
*Non-conference game. ^{#}Rankings from AP Poll. (#) Tournament seedings in parentheses. All times are in Eastern.
