= 2025–26 Arkansas–Pine Bluff Golden Lions men's basketball team =

American college basketball season

2025–26 Arkansas–Pine Bluff Golden Lions men's basketball
- Conference: Southwestern Athletic Conference
- Record: 13–19 (10–8 SWAC)
- Head coach: Solomon Bozeman (5th season)
- Associate head coach: Jeremiah Bozeman
- Assistant coaches: Dee Wallace; Cam Robinson; Jon Coleman
- Home arena: H.O. Clemmons Arena

2025–26 SWAC men's basketball standings
	Conf.				Overall
Team	W		L	PCT	W		L	PCT
Bethune–Cookman	14	–	4	.778	17	–	15	.531
Florida A&M	11	–	7	.611	15	–	16	.484
Southern	11	–	7	.611	17	–	17	.500
Texas Southern	10	–	8	.556	12	–	18	.400
Alabama A&M	10	–	8	.556	18	–	15	.545
Arkansas–Pine Bluff	10	–	8	.556	13	–	19	.406
Jackson State	10	–	8	.556	12	–	21	.364
Prairie View A&M †	9	–	9	.500	19	–	18	.514
Grambling State	7	–	11	.389	14	–	19	.424
Alabama State	7	–	11	.389	10	–	22	.313
Alcorn State	7	–	11	.389	9	–	23	.281
Mississippi Valley State	2	–	16	.111	3	–	30	.091
† 2026 SWAC tournament winner

The 2025–26 Arkansas–Pine Bluff Golden Lions men's basketball team represented the University of Arkansas at Pine Bluff during the 2025–26 NCAA Division I men's basketball season. The Golden Lions, led by fifth-year head coach Solomon Bozeman, played their home games at the H.O. Clemmons Arena in Pine Bluff, Arkansas as members of the Southwestern Athletic Conference.

== Previous season ==
The Golden Lions finished the 2024–25 season 6–25, 3–15 in SWAC play, to finish in 11th place. They failed to qualify for the SWAC tournament, as only the top ten teams make it.

== Preseason ==
On October 8, 2025, the SWAC released their preseason polls. Arkansas–Pine Bluff was picked to finish 11th in the conference, while receiving one first-place vote.

=== Preseason rankings ===
SWAC Preseason Poll
Place	Team	Votes
1	Bethune–Cookman	232 (12)
2	Southern	214 (5)
3	Jackson State	208 (1)
4	Alabama State	183 (3)
5	Texas Southern	182
6	Alabama A&M	163
7	Grambling State	151
8	Florida A&M	115
9	Prairie View A&M	99
10	Alcorn State	74
11	Arkansas–Pine Bluff	70 (1)
12	Mississippi Valley State	25
(#) first-place votes

=== Preseason All-SWAC Teams ===
No players were named to the First or Second Preseason All-SWAC Teams.

== Roster ==
2025–26 Arkansas–Pine Bluff Golden Lions men's basketball team
Players
Coaches

Pos.	#	Name	Height	Weight	Year	Previous school	Hometown
G	0	Trejon Ware	5 ft 9 in (1.75 m)	160 lb (73 kg)	GS	Arkansas Baptist College	Pearland, Texas
G	1	Alex Mirhosseini	5 ft 10 in (1.78 m)	165 lb (75 kg)	Sr	West Virginia Wesleyan	Arlington, Texas
G	2	Jai'chaunn Hayes	6 ft 7 in (2.01 m)	205 lb (93 kg)	Fr	Hot Springs High School	Hot Springs, Arkansas
G	3	Anthony Sellars	6 ft 7 in (2.01 m)	215 lb (98 kg)	RS Jr	Three Rivers College	Winston-Salem, North Carolina
F	4	Jaquan Scott	6 ft 8 in (2.03 m)	230 lb (104 kg)	Sr	UTSA	Dallas, Texas
G	8	Jahmari Hamilton-Brown	6 ft 7 in (2.01 m)	205 lb (93 kg)	Jr	Independence Community College	Salem, Massachusetts
G	9	Milhan Charles	6 ft 7 in (2.01 m)	215 lb (98 kg)	Fr	PrismaWorx BAL	Manosque, France
G	10	Ahmad Johnson	6 ft 4 in (1.93 m)	195 lb (88 kg)	GS	Southeastern	Punta Gorda, Florida
G	13	Quion Williams	6 ft 5 in (1.96 m)	215 lb (98 kg)	Sr	Abilene Christian	Jonesboro, Arkansas
F	15	Dennis Asoro	6 ft 8 in (2.03 m)	250 lb (113 kg)	Sr	Hocking College	Columbus, Ohio
G	20	Trevon Payton	6 ft 5 in (1.96 m)	215 lb (98 kg)	RS Jr	Limestone	Lilburn, Georgia
G	22	Ramel Lloyd Jr.	6 ft 6 in (1.98 m)	215 lb (98 kg)	Jr	Long Beach State	Long Beach, California
G	23	Harrison Pickett	6 ft 2 in (1.88 m)	210 lb (95 kg)	Fr	Benton High School	Little Rock, Arkansas
F	24	Kyle Brown	6 ft 9 in (2.06 m)	240 lb (109 kg)	Sr	Indian River State College	Fort Lauderdale, Florida
F	33	Travis Porciau	6 ft 10 in (2.08 m)	210 lb (95 kg)	Sr	Lees–McRae College	Colorado Springs, Colorado

Head coach

- Solomon Bozeman (Little Rock)

Assistant coach(es)

- Jeremiah Bozeman (Auburn Montgomery)
- Dee Wallace (Cal State Bakersfield)
- Cam Robinson (Arkansas State)
- Jon Coleman (UAB)

Legend

- (C) Team captain
- (S) Suspended
- (I) Ineligible
- (W) Walk-on
- Injured
- Current redshirt

Roster
Last update: December 17, 2025

== Schedule and results ==
Date time, TV	Rank^{#}	Opponent^{#}	Result	Record	High points	High rebounds	High assists	Site (attendance) city, state
Exhibition
October 17, 2025*; 8:00 pm		at Little Rock; Arkansas Central Tip Off Classic	W 77–69	–	–	–	–	Jack Stephens Center; Little Rock, AR
Non-conference regular season
November 3, 2025*; 10:00 pm, B1G+		at Washington	L 50–94	0–1	13 – Tied	6 – Scott	3 – Payton	Alaska Airlines Arena (5,577); Seattle, WA
November 6, 2025*; 9:30 pm, ESPN+		at Portland	L 74–83	0–2	31 – Williams	13 – Williams	4 – Charles	Chiles Center (792); Portland, OR
November 8, 2025*; 8:00 pm, ESPN+		at LMU	L 72–94	0–3	27 – Scott	12 – Scott	5 – Williams	Gersten Pavilion (877); Los Angeles, CA
November 11, 2025*; 7:00 pm, SECN+		at Oklahoma	L 69−95	0−4	15 – Charles	12 – Williams	3 – Williams	McCasland Field House (3,269); Norman, OK
November 15, 2025*; 2:00 pm, SECN+		at Vanderbilt	L 75−104	0−5	22 – Payton	7 – Scott	3 – Williams	Memorial Gymnasium (6,435); Nashville, TN
November 18, 2025*; 7:00 pm, ACCNX		at SMU	L 60–106	0–6	13 – Payton	5 – Payton	4 – Tied	Moody Coliseum (4,347); Dallas, TX
November 20, 2025*; 3:00 pm, ESPN+		at Marshall; Marshall MTE	L 70–98	0–7	23 – Scott	7 – Scott	4 – Williams	Cam Henderson Center (3,373); Huntington, WV
November 23, 2025*; 12:00 pm, ESPN+		at Miami (OH); Marshall MTE	L 84–111	0–8	19 – Scott	12 – Scott	7 – Williams	Millett Hall (1,176); Oxford, OH
December 3, 2025*; 11:00 am, ESPN+		at UIC	W 63–62	1–8	16 – Williams	9 – Charles	6 – Williams	Credit Union 1 Arena (2,394); Chicago, IL
December 6, 2025*; 8:00 pm, truTV		at DePaul	L 72–76	1–9	27 – Williams	9 – Charles	8 – Williams	Wintrust Arena (4,480); Chicago, IL
December 10, 2025*; 7:00 pm, ESPN+		at Tulsa	L 84–117	1–10	30 – Scott	9 – Scott	8 – Williams	Reynolds Center (2,742); Tulsa, OK
December 15, 2025*; 6:00 pm		Ecclesia	W 114–64	2–10	25 – Williams	16 – Williams	7 – Tied	H.O. Clemmons Arena (341); Pine Bluff, AR
December 17, 2025*; 12:00 pm		Champion Christian	W 138–73	3–10	33 – Scott	14 – Williams	18 – Williams	H.O. Clemmons Arena (1,165); Pine Bluff, AR
SWAC regular season
January 3, 2026; 5:30 pm, SWAC TV		Alabama A&M	W 95–83	4–10 (1–0)	24 – Scott	8 – Scott	5 – Tied	H.O. Clemmons Arena (1,467); Pine Bluff, AR
January 5, 2026; 5:30 pm, SWAC TV		Alabama State	W 90–79	5–10 (2–0)	21 – Mirhosseini	10 – Williams	8 – Williams	H.O. Clemmons Arena (648); Pine Bluff, AR
January 10, 2026; 4:30 pm, SWAC TV		at Texas Southern	W 74–66	6–10 (3–0)	18 – Scott	17 – Williams	8 – Williams	H&PE Arena (486); Houston, TX
January 12, 2026; 6:00 pm, SWAC TV		at Prairie View A&M	L 61–73	6–11 (3–1)	17 – Mirhosseini	9 – Williams	2 – Tied	William Nicks Building (225); Prairie View, TX
January 17, 2026; 5:30 pm, SWAC TV		Florida A&M	L 67–71	6–12 (3–2)	16 – Mirhosseini	10 – Williams	6 – Williams	H.O. Clemmons Arena (2,423); Pine Bluff, AR
January 19, 2026; 5:30 pm, SWAC TV		Bethune–Cookman	L 82–87 ^{OT}	6–13 (3–3)	19 – Tied	6 – Tied	9 – Williams	H.O. Clemmons Arena (1,423); Pine Bluff, AR
January 24, 2026; 5:00 pm, SWAC TV		at Southern	W 75–74	7–13 (4–3)	23 – Williams	7 – Williams	4 – Williams	F. G. Clark Center (3,652); Baton Rouge, LA
January 31, 2026; 3:00 pm, SWAC TV		at Mississippi Valley State	W 78–70	8–13 (5–3)	22 – Charles	8 – Charles	5 – Tied	Harrison HPER Complex (1,078); Itta Bena, MS
February 4, 2026; 6:30 pm, SWAC TV		at Grambling State	W 67–64	9–13 (6–3)	18 – Williams	12 – Scott	9 – Williams	Hobdy Assembly Center (1,737); Grambling, LA
February 7, 2026; 5:30 pm, SWAC TV		Alcorn State	W 84–77	10–13 (7–3)	25 – Williams	11 – Scott	6 – Mirhosseini	H.O. Clemmons Arena (2,173); Pine Bluff, AR
February 9, 2026; 5:30 pm, SWAC TV		Jackson State	W 84–63	11–13 (8–3)	25 – Williams	10 – Williams	6 – Williams	H.O. Clemmons Arena (2,046); Pine Bluff, AR
February 14, 2026; 3:30 pm, SWAC TV		at Alabama State	L 61–79	11–14 (8–4)	23 – Williams	9 – Williams	4 – Mirhosseini	Dunn–Oliver Acadome (1,433); Montgomery, AL
February 16, 2026; 7:00 pm, SWAC TV		at Alabama A&M	L 70–82	11–15 (8–5)	26 – Mirhosseini	8 – Williams	6 – Williams	AAMU Event Center (1,134); Huntsville, AL
February 19, 2026; 8:00 pm, SWAC TV		Texas Southern	L 64–83	11–16 (8–6)	15 – Tied	9 – Scott	5 – Mirhosseini	H.O. Clemmons Arena (2,145); Pine Bluff, AR
February 21, 2026; 5:30 pm, SWAC TV		Prairie View A&M	W 84–82	12–16 (9–6)	20 – Williams	7 – Scott	7 – Payton	H.O. Clemmons Arena (2,182); Pine Bluff, AR
February 28, 2026; 5:30 pm, SWAC TV		Mississippi Valley State	L 69–70	12–17 (9–7)	26 – Scott	12 – Williams	4 – Williams	H.O. Clemmons Arena; Pine Bluff, AR
March 3, 2026; 8:00 p.m., SWAC TV		at Jackson State	L 78–81	12–18 (9–8)	21 – Williams	10 – Scott	3 – Tied	Williams Assembly Center (768); Jackson, MS
March 5, 2026; 8:00 p.m., SWAC TV		at Alcorn State	W 83–48	13–18 (10–8)	18 – Williams	13 – Williams	7 – Payton	Davey Whitney Complex (757); Lorman, MS
SWAC tournament
March 12, 2026; 7:30 p.m., ESPN+	(6)	vs. (3) Southern; Quarterfinals	L 81–84	13–19	21 – Williams	10 – Williams	5 – Tied	Gateway Center Arena (912); College Park, GA
*Non-conference game. ^{#}Rankings from AP Poll. (#) Tournament seedings in parentheses. All times are in Central.
