= 2025–26 Bethune–Cookman Wildcats men's basketball team =

American college basketball season

2025–26 Bethune–Cookman Wildcats men's basketball

SWAC regular season champions
- Conference: Southwestern Athletic Conference
- Record: 17–15 (14–4 SWAC)
- Head coach: Reggie Theus (5th season)
- Assistant coaches: Patrick Eberhart; Billy Garrett; Richard Grant; Ambrose Mosley
- Home arena: Moore Gymnasium

2025–26 SWAC men's basketball standings
	Conf.				Overall
Team	W		L	PCT	W		L	PCT
Bethune–Cookman	14	–	4	.778	17	–	15	.531
Florida A&M	11	–	7	.611	15	–	16	.484
Southern	11	–	7	.611	17	–	17	.500
Texas Southern	10	–	8	.556	12	–	18	.400
Alabama A&M	10	–	8	.556	18	–	15	.545
Arkansas–Pine Bluff	10	–	8	.556	13	–	19	.406
Jackson State	10	–	8	.556	12	–	21	.364
Prairie View A&M †	9	–	9	.500	18	–	17	.514
Grambling State	7	–	11	.389	14	–	19	.424
Alabama State	7	–	11	.389	10	–	22	.313
Alcorn State	7	–	11	.389	9	–	23	.281
Mississippi Valley State	2	–	16	.111	3	–	30	.091
† 2026 SWAC tournament winner As of March 14, 2026

The 2025–26 Bethune–Cookman Wildcats men's basketball team represented Bethune–Cookman University during the 2025–26 NCAA Division I men's basketball season. The Wildcats, led by fifth-year head coach Reggie Theus, played their home games at Moore Gymnasium in Daytona Beach, Florida as members of the Southwestern Athletic Conference (SWAC).

== Previous season ==
The Wildcats finished the 2023–24 season 17–16, 13–5 in SWAC play, to finish in third place. They defeated Alcorn State, before falling to number two-seed Jackson State in the semifinals of the SWAC tournament. The Wildcats did not receive a bid to any post season tournaments.

== Preseason ==
On October 8, 2025, the SWAC released their preseason polls. Bethune–Cookman was picked to finish first in the conference, while receiving twelve first-place votes.

=== Preseason rankings ===
SWAC Preseason Poll
Place	Team	Votes
1	Bethune–Cookman	232 (12)
2	Southern	214 (5)
3	Jackson State	208 (1)
4	Alabama State	183 (3)
5	Texas Southern	182
6	Alabama A&M	163
7	Grambling State	151
8	Florida A&M	115
9	Prairie View A&M	99
10	Alcorn State	74
11	Arkansas–Pine Bluff	70 (1)
12	Mississippi Valley State	25
(#) first-place votes

=== Preseason All-SWAC Teams ===
Preseason All-SWAC Team
Team	Player	Year	Position
First	Daniel Rouzan	Senior	Forward
First	Doctor Bradley	Graduate Senior	Guard/Forward
Second	Seneca Willoughby	Senior	Guard

== Roster ==
2025–26 Bethune–Cookman Wildcats men's basketball team
Players
Coaches

Pos.	#	Name	Height	Weight	Year	Previous school	Hometown
G/F	0	Jakobi Heady	6 ft 6 in (1.98 m)	200 lb (91 kg)	Sr	Central Michigan	Chicago, IL
G	1	Arterio Morris	6 ft 4 in (1.93 m)	200 lb (91 kg)	RS Jr	South Plains Junior College	Dallas, TX
G	2	Rickey Mitchell Jr.	6 ft 4 in (1.93 m)	180 lb (82 kg)	Jr	City College of San Francisco	Aurora, CO
G	3	Seneca Willoughby	6 ft 4 in (1.93 m)	185 lb (84 kg)	Sr	Contra Costa College	Philadelphia, PA
F	4	Ariel Bland	6 ft 7 in (2.01 m)	230 lb (104 kg)	GS	UC Santa Barbara	Eden Prairie, MN
F	5	Quentin Heady	6 ft 6 in (1.98 m)	200 lb (91 kg)	Fr	Central Michigan	Chicago, IL
G	11	Jordan Johnson	6 ft 4 in (1.93 m)	195 lb (88 kg)	RS Jr	Southern	West Palm Beach, FL
G	12	Dailon Minor	6 ft 1 in (1.85 m)	170 lb (77 kg)	Fr	BigTyme Prep Academy	Rowlett, TX
G/F	13	Doctor Bradley	6 ft 8 in (2.03 m)	210 lb (95 kg)	GS	Arkansas-Pine Bluff	Los Angeles, CA
F	15	Reggie Jr. Ward	6 ft 6 in (1.98 m)	230 lb (104 kg)	GS	Riverside City College	Chicago, IL
G/F	22	William Gonzalez	6 ft 6 in (1.98 m)	180 lb (82 kg)	RS Fr	Curie HS	Chicago, IL
F	23	Daniel Rouzan	6 ft 8 in (2.03 m)	235 lb (107 kg)	Sr	Manhattan	Las Vegas, NV
G	24	Trayvon Barbary	6 ft 4 in (1.93 m)	175 lb (79 kg)	Sr	DeLand HS	DeLand, FL
G/F	25	Tyler Andrews	6 ft 6 in (1.98 m)	205 lb (93 kg)	Sr	Eastern Kentucky	Los Angeles, CA
G	30	Simeon Womack	6 ft 2 in (1.88 m)	170 lb (77 kg)	RS Sr	Victory Rock Prep	Jacksonville, FL
C	33	David Onanina	6 ft 8 in (2.03 m)	230 lb (104 kg)	RS Jr	Eastern Kentucky	Yaoundé, Cameroon

Head coach

- Reggie Theus (UNLV)

Assistant coach(es)

- Patrick Eberhart (Adams State)
- Billy Garrett (DePaul)
- Richard Grant (Bridgeport)
- Ambrose Mosley (Old Dominion)

Legend

- (C) Team captain
- (S) Suspended
- (I) Ineligible
- (W) Walk-on
- Injured
- Current redshirt

Roster
Last update: December 3, 2025

== Schedule and results ==
Date time, TV	Rank^{#}	Opponent^{#}	Result	Record	High points	High rebounds	High assists	Site (attendance) city, state
Non-conference regular season
November 3, 2025*; 8:00 p.m., SECN+		at No. 20 Auburn	L 90–95 ^{OT}	0–1	21 – Q. Heady	10 – Morris	5 – Willoughby	Neville Arena (9,121); Auburn, AL
November 6, 2025*; 7:00 p.m., ACCNX		at Miami (FL)	L 61–101	0–2	19 – J. Heady	6 – Tied	3 – Morris	Watsco Center (4,508); Coral Gables, FL
November 11, 2025*; 6:00 p.m.		Coastal Georgia	W 101–60	1–2	21 – Morris	12 – Bland	3 – Morris	Moore Gymnasium (777); Daytona Beach, FL
November 15, 2025*; 7:30 p.m., WHIO-TV/ESPN+		at Dayton	L 82–91	1–3	19 – Morris	6 – Tied	3 – Tied	UD Arena (13,407); Dayton, OH
November 19, 2025*; 7:00 p.m., ESPN+		at Ohio	W 76–73	2–3	20 – J. Heady	6 – Q. Heady	3 – Tied	Convocation Center (3,664); Athens, OH
November 24, 2025*; 2:00 p.m., BallerTV		vs. Jacksonville; Sunshine Slam Semifinals	L 64–69	2–4	19 – J. Heady	6 – Tied	5 – Morris	Ocean Center; Daytona Beach, FL
November 25, 2025*; 11:00 a.m., BallerTV		vs. Stony Brook; Sunshine Slam Consolation	L 54–61	2–5	22 – Q. Heady	12 – Bland	3 – Morris	Ocean Center; Daytona Beach, FL
November 29, 2025*; 12:00 p.m., BTN		at No. 25 Indiana	L 56–100	2–6	15 – J. Heady	8 – J. Heady	2 – Tied	Simon Skjodt Assembly Hall (12,192); Bloomington, IN
December 5, 2025*; 7:00 p.m.		South Carolina State	W 80–59	3–6	22 – J. Heady	7 – J. Heady	5 – Tied	Moore Gymnasium (467); Daytona Beach, FL
December 14, 2025*; 2:00 p.m., SECN		at Missouri	L 60–82	3–7	15 – J. Heady	5 – Rouzan	2 – Morris	Mizzou Arena (8,049); Columbia, MO
December 17, 2025*; 8:00 p.m., ESPN+		at Saint Louis	L 53–112	3–8	23 – J. Heady	8 – Bland	1 – Tied	Chaifetz Arena (4,097); St. Louis, MO
December 22, 2025*; 9:00 p.m., ESPN+		at No. 1 Arizona	L 71–107	3–9	18 – Johnson	8 – Q. Heady	4 – T. Andrews	McKale Center (14,378); Tucson, AZ
December 29, 2025*; 8:00 p.m., ESPN+		at Oklahoma State	L 77–103	3–10	17 – Heady	7 – Bland	5 – Mitchell Jr.	Gallagher-Iba Arena (6,407); Stillwater, OK
SWAC regular season
January 3, 2026; 3:30 p.m., HBCU Go		Florida A&M	W 87–83	4–10 (1–0)	20 – Tied	7 – Andrews	4 – Willoughby	Moore Gymnasium (864); Daytona Beach, FL
January 10, 2026; 5:30 p.m., SWAC TV		Grambling State	W 74–65	5–10 (2–0)	15 – Rouzan	5 – J. Heady	4 – Willoughby	Moore Gymnasium (689); Daytona Beach, FL
January 12, 2026; 7:00 p.m., SWAC TV		Southern	L 73–77	5–11 (2–1)	21 – J. Heady	8 – Q. Heady	3 – Willoughby	Moore Gymnasium (876); Daytona Beach, FL
January 17, 2026; 6:00 p.m.		at Mississippi Valley State	W 79-63	6-11 (3–1)	23 – J. Heady	5 – Tied	6 – Morris	Harrison HPER Complex (554); Itta Bena, MS
January 19, 2026; 6:30 p.m.		at Arkansas–Pine Bluff	W 87–82 ^{OT}	7–11 (4–1)	25 – J. Heady	9 – Bradley	3 – Bradley	H.O. Clemmons Arena (1,423); Pine Bluff, AR
January 24, 2026; 4:00 p.m., ESPNU		Jackson State	W 85–48	8–11 (5–1)	22 – Bradley	10 – Bradley	4 – Tied	Moore Gymnasium (824); Daytona Beach, FL
January 26, 2026; 7:00 p.m., SWAC TV		Alcorn State	W 82–73	9–11 (6–1)	24 – Rouzan	9 – Bradley	5 – Willoughby	Moore Gymnasium (912); Daytona Beach, FL
January 31, 2026; 3:30 p.m., HBCU GO		at Alabama State	W 69–54	10–11 (7–1)	18 – J. Heady	10 – Bradley	4 – Morris	Dunn-Oliver Acadome (1,454); Montgomery, AL
February 2, 2026; 8:00 p.m.		at Alabama A&M	W 80–62	11–11 (8–1)	19 – J. Heady	10 – Bradley	3 – Bland	AAMU Events Center (2,734); Huntsville, AL
February 7, 2026; 5:30 p.m., SWAC TV		Prairie View A&M	W 82–76	12–11 (9–1)	30 – J. Heady	10 – Rouzan	3 – Morris	Moore Gymnasium (816); Daytona Beach, FL
February 9, 2026; 7:00 p.m., SWAC TV		Texas Southern	W 79–69	13–11 (10–1)	17 – Andrews	7 – Tied	5 – Morris	Moore Gymnasium (965); Daytona Beach, FL
February 14, 2026; 4:00 p.m.		at Alcorn State	L 55–57	13–12 (10–2)	13 – Rouzan	7 – Rouzan	4 – Willoughby	Davey Whitney Complex (695); Lorman, MS
February 16, 2026; 7:00 p.m., ESPNU		at Jackson State	L 86–91	13–13 (10–3)	25 – Tied	13 – Rouzan	3 – Tied	Williams Assembly Center (1,056); Jackson, MS
February 19, 2026; 7:00 p.m., SWAC TV		Alabama State	W 82–71	14–13 (11–3)	26 – J. Heady	13 – Bland	6 – Willoughby	Moore Gymnasium (878); Daytona Beach, FL
February 21, 2026; 5:30 p.m., SWAC TV		Alabama A&M	W 85–76	15–13 (12–3)	19 – J. Heady	6 – Bland	6 – Heady	Moore Gymnasium (912); Daytona Beach, FL
February 26, 2026; 5:00 p.m., SWAC TV		at Grambling State	W 76–71	16–13 (13–3)	20 – J. Heady	9 – Bland	7 – Bland	Hobdy Assembly Center (1,015); Grambling, LA
February 28, 2026; 3:30 p.m., HBCU Go		at Southern	W 82–79	17–13 (14–3)	19 – Morris	11 – Bland	3 – Tied	F. G. Clark Center (5,125); Baton Rouge, LA
March 5, 2026; 7:30 p.m., HBCU Go		at Florida A&M	L 77–81	17–14 (14–4)	19 – J. Heady	10 – Bland	4 – Morris	Al Lawson Center (3,100); Tallahassee, FL
SWAC tournament
March 11, 2026; 2:00 p.m., ESPN+	(1)	vs. (8) Prairie View A&M; Quarterfinals	L 67–71	17–15	21 – J. Heady	7 – Tied	5 – Morris	Gateway Center Arena (925); College Park, GA
*Non-conference game. ^{#}Rankings from AP poll. (#) Tournament seedings in parentheses. All times are in Eastern.
