= 2025–26 Mississippi Valley State Delta Devils basketball team =

American college basketball season

2025–26 Mississippi Valley State Delta Devils basketball
- Conference: Southwestern Athletic Conference
- Record: 3–30 (2–16 SWAC)
- Head coach: George Ivory (4th season)
- Assistant coaches: Clinton Young; Khalid Campbell; Antonio Sanders
- Home arena: Harrison HPER Complex

2025–26 SWAC men's basketball standings
	Conf.				Overall
Team	W		L	PCT	W		L	PCT
Bethune–Cookman	14	–	4	.778	17	–	14	.548
Florida A&M	11	–	7	.611	14	–	15	.483
Southern	11	–	7	.611	15	–	16	.484
Texas Southern	10	–	8	.556	12	–	17	.414
Alabama A&M	10	–	8	.556	17	–	14	.548
Arkansas–Pine Bluff	10	–	8	.556	13	–	18	.419
Jackson State	10	–	8	.556	11	–	20	.355
Prairie View A&M	9	–	9	.500	14	–	17	.452
Grambling State	7	–	11	.389	13	–	18	.419
Alabama State	7	–	11	.389	10	–	21	.323
Alcorn State	7	–	11	.389	8	–	22	.267
Mississippi Valley State	2	–	16	.111	3	–	29	.094
† 2026 SWAC tournament winner As of March 5, 2026

The 2025–26 Mississippi Valley State Delta Devils basketball team represented Mississippi Valley State University during the 2025–26 NCAA Division I men's basketball season. The Delta Devils, led by fourth-year head coach George Ivory, played their home games at the Harrison HPER Complex in Itta Bena, Mississippi as members of the Southwestern Athletic Conference (SWAC).

== Previous season ==
The Delta Devils finished the 2023–24 season 3–28, 1–17 in SWAC play, to finish in last place. They failed to qualify for the SWAC tournament, as only the top 10 teams were selected to participate.

== Preseason ==
On October 8, 2025, the SWAC released their preseason polls. Mississippi Valley State was picked to finish last in the conference.

=== Preseason rankings ===
SWAC Preseason Poll
Place	Team	Votes
1	Bethune–Cookman	232 (12)
2	Southern	214 (5)
3	Jackson State	208 (1)
4	Alabama State	183 (3)
5	Texas Southern	182
6	Alabama A&M	163
7	Grambling State	151
8	Florida A&M	115
9	Prairie View A&M	99
10	Alcorn State	74
11	Arkansas–Pine Bluff	70 (1)
12	Mississippi Valley State	25
(#) first-place votes

=== Preseason All-SWAC Teams ===
No players were named to the First or Second Preseason All-SWAC Teams.

== Roster ==
2025–26 Mississippi Valley State Delta Devils men's basketball team
Players
Coaches

Pos.	#	Name	Height	Weight	Year	Previous school	Hometown
G/F	0	Patrick Punch	6 ft 4 in (1.93 m)	185 lb (84 kg)	RS Sr	National Park CC	Houston, TX
G	1	Antonio Sisk	6 ft 1 in (1.85 m)	180 lb (82 kg)	Sr	Cedar Valley CC	Dallas, TX
G	2	Delkedric Holmes	6 ft 2 in (1.88 m)	180 lb (82 kg)	Jr	Texas Wesleyan	Pine Bluff, AR
G/F	3	Lamont Sims	6 ft 9 in (2.06 m)	200 lb (91 kg)	GS	Talladega	Savannah, GA
F	5	Chance Sutton	6 ft 7 in (2.01 m)	205 lb (93 kg)	Jr	Meridian CC	Dallas, TX
G	10	Michael James	6 ft 1 in (1.85 m)	175 lb (79 kg)	Jr	Meridian CC	Byhalia, MS
G	11	Xzayvion Childress	6 ft 0 in (1.83 m)	175 lb (79 kg)	Jr	Meridian CC	Calera, AL
F/C	13	Tyrone Iroghama	6 ft 8 in (2.03 m)	230 lb (104 kg)	Jr	Bossier Parish CC	London, UK
G	14	George Ivory III	6 ft 2 in (1.88 m)	175 lb (79 kg)	GS	Arkansas–Pine Bluff	Pine Bluff, AR
F/C	20	Mussa Mzein	6 ft 10 in (2.08 m)	245 lb (111 kg)	Jr	Eastfield CC	Stockholm, Sweden
G/F	21	Samuel Murray	6 ft 8 in (2.03 m)	200 lb (91 kg)	RS Jr	Missouri State	Gulfport, MS
F	22	Daniel Mayfield	6 ft 8 in (2.03 m)	215 lb (98 kg)	Sr	Mars Hill	Toccoa, GA
F	23	Derrick Singleton	6 ft 4 in (1.93 m)	195 lb (88 kg)	Jr	Texas College	Inglewood, CA
G/F	24	X'Zaevion Barnett	6 ft 2 in (1.88 m)	210 lb (95 kg)	Jr	Bossier Parish CC	Altheimer, AR
C	35	Jonathan Pace	6 ft 10 in (2.08 m)	275 lb (125 kg)	So	Harrison Central HS	Gulfport, MS

Head coach

- George Ivory (Mississippi Valley State)

Assistant coach(es)

- Clinton Young
- Khalid Campbell (Arkansas–Pine Bluff)
- Antonio Sanders

Legend

- (C) Team captain
- (S) Suspended
- (I) Ineligible
- (W) Walk-on
- Injured
- Current redshirt

Roster
Last update: January 29, 2026

== Schedule and results ==
Date time, TV	Rank^{#}	Opponent^{#}	Result	Record	High points	High rebounds	High assists	Site (attendance) city, state
Non-conference regular season
November 3, 2025*; 6:30 p.m., ESPN+		at UAB	L 55–106	0–1	25 – James	5 – Sams	2 – Tied	Bartow Arena (3,013); Birmingham, AL
November 5, 2025*; 6:00 p.m.		Mississippi University for Women	W 97–61	1–1	35 – James	12 – Mayfield	5 – Sisk	Harrison HPER Complex (286); Itta Bena, MS
November 7, 2025*; 7:00 p.m., ESPN+		at Murray State	L 60–108	1–2	17 – Mayfield	10 – Murray	2 – Tied	CFSB Center (5,214); Murray, KY
November 12, 2025*; 11:00 p.m., ESPN+		at Hawai'i; Rainbow Classic	L 56–88	1-3	11 – James	5 – Sutton	2 – Tied	Stan Sheriff Center (4,091); Honolulu, HI
November 14, 2025*; 8:30 p.m.		vs. Utah Tech; Rainbow Classic	L 75–81 ^{2OT}	1–4	20 – James	9 – Mayfield	4 – Punch	Stan Sheriff Center; Honolulu, HI
November 15, 2025*; 8:30 p.m.		vs. Manhattan; Rainbow Classic	L 73–80	1–5	28 – Mayfield	8 – Mayfield	3 – Mayfield	Stan Sheriff Center; Honolulu, HI
November 22, 2025*; 3:00 p.m., ESPN+		at Cal State Bakersfield	L 70–86	1–6	22 – Mayfield	10 – Mayfield	2 – Tied	Icardo Center (309); Bakersfield, CA
November 25, 2025*; 7:00 p.m., SECN+		at Texas A&M	L 84–120	1–7	32 – James	9 – Barnett	7 – Barnett	Reed Arena (6,426); College Station, TX
December 3, 2025*; 6:30 p.m., ESPN+		at UL Monroe	L 52–66	1–8	15 – Mayfield	7 – Murray	3 – Punch	Fant-Ewing Coliseum (938); Monroe, LA
December 8, 2025*; 7:00 p.m., ESPN+		at Kansas State	L 49–108	1–9	23 – James	7 – Barnett	4 – Punch	Bramlage Coliseum (6,682); Manhattan, KS
December 16, 2025*; 6:00 p.m.		Tarleton State	L 64–88	1–10	27 – James	5 – James	6 – Barnett	Harrison HPER Complex (102); Itta Bena, MS
December 19, 2025*; 2:00 p.m., ACCNX		at Florida State	L 49–96	1–11	20 – James	7 – Sams	3 – Sams	Donald L. Tucker Center (3,692); Tallahassee, FL
December 22, 2025*; 6:00 p.m., ESPN+		at West Virginia	L 51–86	1–12	14 – James	5 – Tied	2 – Mzein	Hope Coliseum (10,234); Morgantown, WV
December 29, 2025*; 7:00 p.m., SECN+		at Oklahoma	L 69–93	1–13	24 – James	4 – Punch	7 – Holmes	Lloyd Noble Center (4,866); Norman, OK
SWAC regular season
January 3, 2026; 5:00 p.m., SWAC TV		Alabama State	L 69–89	1–14 (0–1)	22 – Sams	8 – Sams	5 – James	Harrison HPER Complex (348); Itta Bena, MS
January 5, 2026; 7:00 p.m., SWAC TV		Alabama A&M	L 51–71	1–15 (0–2)	22 – James	8 – Sams	4 – James	Harrison HPER Complex (125); Itta Bena, MS
January 10, 2026; 4:30 p.m., SWAC TV		at Prairie View A&M	L 69–70	1–16 (0–3)	20 – Mayfield	11 – Punch	4 – Punch	William Nicks Building (264); Prairie View, TX
January 12, 2026; 7:00 p.m., SWAC TV		at Texas Southern	L 51–84	1–17 (0–4)	18 – Punch	10 – Mzein	4 – Barnett	H&PE Arena (1,803); Houston, TX
January 17, 2026; 5:00 p.m., SWAC TV		Bethune–Cookman	L 63–79	1–18 (0–5)	34 – James	6 – Sutton	4 – James	Harrison HPER Complex (554); Itta Bena, MS
January 19, 2026; 7:00 p.m., SWAC TV		Florida A&M	L 48–62	1–19 (0–6)	14 – Tied	7 – Barnett	3 – Childress	Harrison HPER Complex (167); Itta Bena, MS
January 24, 2026; 4:00 p.m., SWAC TV		at Grambling State	Postponed to February 23 due to inclement weather					Hobdy Assembly Center; Grambling, LA
January 28, 2026; 1:00 p.m., SWAC TV		at Southern	L 69–80	1−20 (0−7)	23 – James	15 – Mayfield	5 – Childress	F.G. Clark Center (2,862); Baton Rouge, LA
January 31, 2026; 5:00 p.m., SWAC TV		Arkansas–Pine Bluff	L 70–78	1−21 (0−8)	25 – James	7 – Mayfield	6 – Childress	Harrison HPER Complex (1,078); Itta Bena, MS
February 7, 2026; 5:00 p.m., SWAC TV		Jackson State	L 81–97	1−22 (0−9)	32 – James	7 – Barnett	6 – Barnett	Harrison HPER Complex (573); Itta Bena, MS
February 9, 2026; 7:00 p.m., SWAC TV		Alcorn State	L 66–74	1−23 (0−10)	28 – James	11 – Mayfield	7 – Barnett	Harrison HPER Complex (219); Itta Bena, MS
February 14, 2026; 4:00 p.m., SWAC TV		at Alabama A&M	L 65–72	1−24 (0−11)	21 – James	7 – Mayfield	5 – Barnett	AAMU Events Center; Huntsville, AL
February 16, 2026; 6:00 p.m., Hornet Sports		at Alabama State	L 55–92	1–25 (0–12)	26 – James	5 – Barnett	3 – Barnett	Dunn-Oliver Acadome (1,235); Montgomery, AL
February 19, 2026; 7:30 p.m., SWAC TV		Prairie View A&M	L 62–72	1–26 (0–13)	20 – James	6 – Mayfield	3 – James	Harrison HPER Complex; Itta Bena, MS
February 21, 2026; 5:00 p.m., SWAC TV		Texas Southern; Senior Day	W 72–71	2–26 (1–13)	24 – James	7 – Mayfield	5 – Childress	Harrison HPER Complex (1,012); Itta Bena, MS
February 23, 2026; 7:00 p.m., SWAC TV		at Grambling State	L 62–83	2–27 (1–14)	19 – Michael	8 – Michael	7 – Barnett	Hodby Assembly Center (751); Grambling, LA
February 28, 2026; 5:00 p.m., SWAC TV		at Arkansas–Pine Bluff	W 70–69	3–27 (2–14)	21 – Michael	9 – Barnettt	4 – Barrett	H.O. Clemmons Arena (3,151); Pine Bluff, AR
March 3, 2026; 7:00 p.m.		at Alcorn State	L 64–67	3–28 (2–15)	18 – Mayfield	10 – Mayfield	7 – James	Davey Whitney Complex (515); Lorman, MS
March 5, 2026; 5:00 p.m., SWAC TV		at Jackson State	L 77–85	3–29 (2–16)	22 – James	8 – Murray	4 – Tied	Williams Assembly Center (1,196); Jackson, MS
SWAC tournament
March 9, 2026; 7:30 pm, ESPN+	(12)	vs. (9) Grambling State; First round	L 52–77	3–30	23 – James	7 – James	4 – James	Gateway Center Arena (807); College Park, GA
*Non-conference game. ^{#}Rankings from AP poll. (#) Tournament seedings in parentheses. All times are in Central.
