= 2025–26 Alabama A&M Bulldogs basketball team =

American college basketball season

2025–26 Alabama A&M Bulldogs basketball
- Conference: Southwestern Athletic Conference
- Record: 18–15 (10–8 SWAC)
- Head coach: Donte' Jackson (1st season)
- Associate head coach: Kyle Jones
- Assistant coaches: Devarus Walker; Cameron Prather; Jerome Gray; R. Cal Cochran Jr.
- Home arena: AAMU Event Center

2025–26 SWAC men's basketball standings
	Conf.				Overall
Team	W		L	PCT	W		L	PCT
Bethune–Cookman	14	–	4	.778	17	–	15	.531
Florida A&M	11	–	7	.611	15	–	16	.484
Southern	11	–	7	.611	17	–	17	.500
Texas Southern	10	–	8	.556	12	–	18	.400
Alabama A&M	10	–	8	.556	18	–	15	.545
Arkansas–Pine Bluff	10	–	8	.556	13	–	19	.406
Jackson State	10	–	8	.556	12	–	21	.364
Prairie View A&M †	9	–	9	.500	19	–	18	.514
Grambling State	7	–	11	.389	14	–	19	.424
Alabama State	7	–	11	.389	10	–	22	.313
Alcorn State	7	–	11	.389	9	–	23	.281
Mississippi Valley State	2	–	16	.111	3	–	30	.091
† 2026 SWAC tournament winner

The 2025–26 Alabama A&M Bulldogs basketball team represented Alabama A&M University during the 2025–26 NCAA Division I men's basketball season. The Bulldogs, led by first-year head coach Donte' Jackson, played their home games at the Alabama A&M Events Center in Huntsville, Alabama as members of the Southwestern Athletic Conference.

== Previous season ==
The Bulldogs finished the 2024–25 season 10–22, 6–12 in SWAC play, to finish in ninth place. They were defeated by Grambling State in the first round of the SWAC tournament.

On March 25, the school announced the resignation of head coach Otis Hughley Jr., ending his three-year tenure with the team. On April 3, the school announced that they would be hiring Grambling State head coach Donte' Jackson as the team's next head coach.

== Preseason ==
On October 8, 2025, the SWAC released their preseason polls. Alabama A&M was picked to finish sixth in the conference.

=== Preseason rankings ===
SWAC Preseason Poll
Place	Team	Votes
1	Bethune–Cookman	232 (12)
2	Southern	214 (5)
3	Jackson State	208 (1)
4	Alabama State	183 (3)
5	Texas Southern	182
6	Alabama A&M	163
7	Grambling State	151
8	Florida A&M	115
9	Prairie View A&M	99
10	Alcorn State	74
11	Arkansas–Pine Bluff	70 (1)
12	Mississippi Valley State	25
(#) first-place votes

=== Preseason All-SWAC Teams ===
Preseason All-SWAC Team
Team	Player	Year	Position
First	Kintavious Dozier	Senior	Guard

== Roster ==
2025–26 Alabama A&M Bulldogs men's basketball team
Players
Coaches

Pos.	#	Name	Height	Weight	Year	Previous school	Hometown
G	00	Kintavious Dozier	6 ft 1 in (1.85 m)	195 lb (88 kg)	Sr	Grambling State	Lanett, Alabama
G	1	Koron Davis	6 ft 7 in (2.01 m)	185 lb (84 kg)	RS Jr	Louisiana	Gary, Indiana
G	2	Bilal Abdur-Rahman	5 ft 11 in (1.8 m)	160 lb (73 kg)	So	Norcross High School	Atlanta, Georgia
G	3	Sami Pissis	6 ft 3 in (1.91 m)	190 lb (86 kg)	Sr	New Hampshire	Paris, France
G/F	4	Gabe Kincy	6 ft 7 in (2.01 m)	210 lb (95 kg)	RS Jr	Grambling State	Broward County, Florida
G/F	5	Jalen Carruth	6 ft 7 in (2.01 m)	190 lb (86 kg)	RS So	Wallace State Community College	Atlanta, Georgia
G	7	Jayden Jackson	5 ft 10 in (1.78 m)	175 lb (79 kg)	Fr	West Monroe High School	West Monroe, Louisiana
G	8	Peyton Daniels Sr.	6 ft 3 in (1.91 m)	180 lb (82 kg)	RS Jr	Jacksonville State	Ellenwood, Georgia
F	10	PJ Eason	6 ft 9 in (2.06 m)	225 lb (102 kg)	Sr	Grambling State	Dadeville, Alabama
G	11	Tajden Davis	6 ft 5 in (1.96 m)	205 lb (93 kg)	RS Jr	Southern Union State Community College	Tallahassee, Florida
F	13	Angok Anyang	6 ft 9 in (2.06 m)	215 lb (98 kg)	Jr	Ottawa	Adelaide, Australia
G	20	Isaiah Ramey	6 ft 7 in (2.01 m)	205 lb (93 kg)	RS Jr	Midway	Cedarville, Ohio
G/F	21	James Graham III	6 ft 8 in (2.03 m)	215 lb (98 kg)	RS Jr	Grambling State	Milwaukee, Wisconsin
F	23	Samuel Onu	6 ft 11 in (2.11 m)	260 lb (118 kg)	RS Jr	Grambling State	Malvern, Pennsylvania
G/F	24	Lou Hutchinson	6 ft 7 in (2.01 m)	195 lb (88 kg)	RS Jr	Grambling State	Washington, D.C.
F	30	James Flippin	6 ft 10 in (2.08 m)	275 lb (125 kg)	Sr	Grambling State	Milwaukee, Wisconsin

Head coach

- Donte' Jackson (Central State)

Assistant coach(es)

- Kyle Jones (Arkansas–Pine Bluff)
- Devarus Walker (William Carey)
- Cameron Prather (Cumberland)
- Jerome Gray (Eastern Illinois)

Legend

- (C) Team captain
- (S) Suspended
- (I) Ineligible
- (W) Walk-on
- Injured
- Current redshirt

Roster
Last update: December 12, 2025

== Schedule and results ==
Date time, TV	Rank^{#}	Opponent^{#}	Result	Record	Site (attendance) city, state
Exhibition
October 13, 2025*; 7:00 pm		vs. Samford; Ballin in Boutwell	W 74–73	–	Boutwell Memorial Auditorium (1,053); Birmingham, AL
October 27, 2025*; 7:00 pm, SWAC TV		UAH; Mayor's Cup	W 75–68	–	AAMU Event Center (3,527); Huntsville, AL
Non-conference regular season
November 3, 2025*; 7:00 pm, SWAC TV		Blue Mountain Christian	W 80–60	1–0	AAMU Event Center (851); Huntsville, AL
November 5, 2025*; 7:00 pm, BTN		at Indiana	L 51–98	1–1	Simon Skjodt Assembly Hall (17,222); Bloomington, IN
November 13, 2025*; 7:00 pm, SWAC TV		Charleston Southern; Bulldog Bash	W 68–64	2–1	AAMU Event Center (1,833); Huntsville, AL
November 16, 2025*; 3:00 pm, SWAC TV		Lindenwood; Bulldog Bash	W 74–65	3–1	AAMU Event Center (1,250); Huntsville, AL
November 28, 2025*; 6:00 pm, ACCNX		at Clemson	L 56–92	3–2	Littlejohn Coliseum (6,118); Clemson, SC
November 30, 2025*; 2:30 pm, ESPN+		at Coastal Carolina	L 60–67	3–3	HTC Center (1,502); Conway, SC
December 3, 2025*; 7:00 pm, SWAC TV		Tennessee State	W 80–53	4–3	AAMU Event Center (3,223); Huntsville, AL
December 7, 2025*; 4:00 pm, ESPN+		at Lipscomb	L 58–92	4–4	Allen Arena (853); Nashville, TN
December 13, 2025*; 4:00 pm, SWAC TV		Arkansas Baptist	W 67–59	5–4	AAMU Event Center (711); Huntsville, AL
December 15, 2025*; 7:00 pm, SWAC TV		North Alabama	W 68–60	6–4	AAMU Event Center (1,209); Huntsville, AL
December 17, 2025*; 7:00 pm, SECN+		vs. Ole Miss	L 66–80	6–5	Cadence Bank Arena (2,317); Tupelo, MS
December 21, 2025*; 2:00 pm, SWAC TV		Chattanooga	L 66–73	6–6	AAMU Event Center (388); Huntsville, AL
December 30, 2025*; 5:00 pm, SWAC TV		Fisk	W 90–58	7–6	AAMU Event Center (405); Huntsville, AL
SWAC regular season
January 3, 2026; 5:30 pm, SWAC TV		at Arkansas–Pine Bluff	L 83–95	7–7 (0–1)	H.O. Clemmons Arena (1,467); Pine Bluff, AR
January 5, 2026; 7:00 pm, SWAC TV		at Mississippi Valley State	W 71–51	8–7 (1–1)	Harrison HPER Complex (125); Itta Bena, MS
January 10, 2026; 4:30 pm, SWAC TV		Alcorn State	L 62–64	8–8 (1–2)	AAMU Event Center (2,312); Huntsville, AL
January 12, 2026; 7:00 pm, SWAC TV		Jackson State	W 100–91	9–8 (2–2)	AAMU Event Center (2,823); Huntsville, AL
January 19, 2026; 4:00 pm, SWAC TV		vs. Alabama State; Bridge Builder Classic	W 73-69	10-8 (3-2)	Mitchell Center (2,350); Mobile, AL
January 24, 2026; 2:30 pm, HBCU GO		at Texas Southern	L 74–89	10–9 (3–3)	H&PE Arena (1,027); Houston, TX
January 27, 2026; 1:00 pm, SWAC TV		at Prairie View A&M	W 80–60	11–9 (4–3)	William Nicks Building (224); Prairie View, TX
January 31, 2026; 4:00 pm, SWAC TV		Florida A&M	W 72–65	12–9 (5–3)	AAMU Event Center (4,988); Huntsville, AL
February 2, 2026; 7:00 pm, SWAC TV		Bethune–Cookman	L 62–80	12–10 (5–4)	AAMU Event Center (2,734); Huntsville, AL
February 7, 2026; 5:00 pm, SWAC TV		at Southern	L 68–81	12–11 (5–5)	F. G. Clark Center (4,985); Baton Rouge, LA
February 9, 2026; 6:30 pm, SWAC TV		at Grambling State	W 66–58	13–11 (6–5)	Fredrick C. Hobdy Assembly Center (2,221); Grambling, LA
February 14, 2026; 4:00 pm, SWAC TV		Mississippi Valley State	W 72–65	14–11 (7–5)	AAMU Event Center; Huntsville, AL
February 16, 2026; 7:00 pm, SWAC TV		Arkansas–Pine Bluff	W 82–70	15–11 (8–5)	AAMU Event Center (1,134); Huntsville, AL
February 19, 2026; 7:30 pm, SWAC TV		at Florida A&M	W 63–61	16–11 (9–5)	Al Lawson Center (1,205); Tallahassee, FL
February 21, 2026; 4:30 pm, SWAC TV		at Bethune–Cookman	L 76–85	16–12 (9–6)	Moore Gymnasium (912); Daytona Beach, FL
February 28, 2026; 4:00 pm, SWAC TV		Alabama State	L 88–89	16–13 (9–7)	AAMU Event Center (6,569); Huntsville, AL
March 3, 2026; 7:30 pm, SWAC TV		Grambling State	W 77–63	17–13 (10–7)	AAMU Event Center (3,098); Huntsville, AL
March 5, 2026; 7:30 pm, SWAC TV		Southern	L 85–88	17–14 (10–8)	AAMU Event Center (2,198); Huntsville, AL
SWAC tournament
March 12, 2026; 1:00 p.m., ESPN+	(5)	vs. (4) Texas Southern; Quarterfinals	W 85–74 ^{OT}	18–14	Gateway Center Arena (1,028); College Park, GA
March 13, 2026; 1:00 p.m., ESPN+	(5)	vs. (8) Prairie View A&M; Quarterfinals	L 55–74	18–15	Gateway Center Arena (1,029); College Park, GA
*Non-conference game. ^{#}Rankings from AP Poll. (#) Tournament seedings in parentheses. All times are in Central.
