= Byron Smith (basketball) =

American basketball player and coach

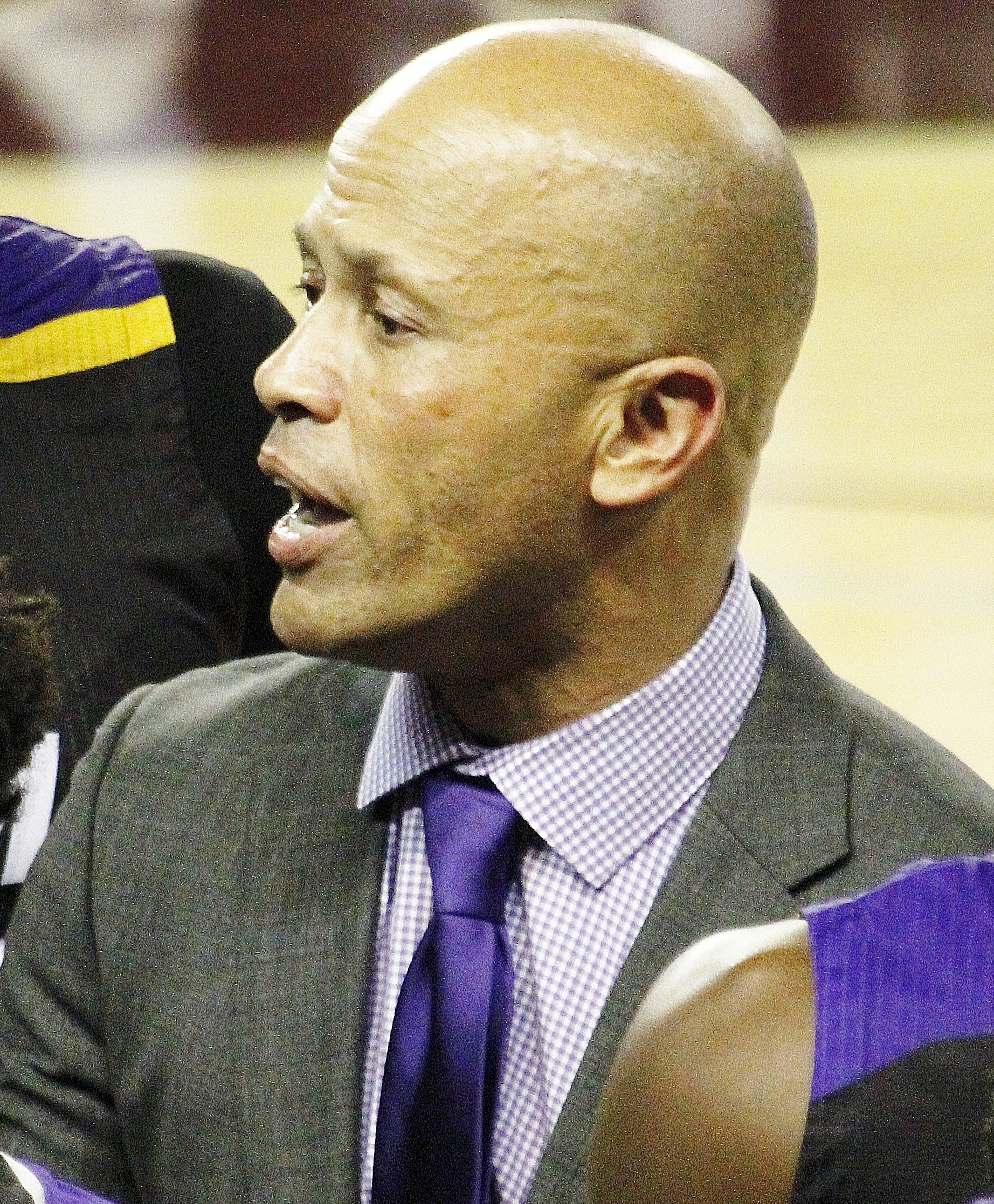
- Smith with Prairie View A&M in 2020

Current position
- Title: Head coach
- Team: Prairie View A&M
- Conference: SWAC
- Record: 147–179 (.451)

Biographical details
- Born: September 26, 1969 (age 57); Bossier City, Louisiana, U.S.

Playing career
- 1987–1988: Northwestern State
- 1988–1989: Tyler JC
- 1989–1991: Houston

Coaching career (HC unless noted)
- 1998–2000: Houston (assistant)
- 2000–2001: Texas Southern (assistant)
- 2001–2002: McLennan CC (assistant)
- 2002–2003: Harlem Globetrotters
- 2007–2009: Texas A&M (assistant)
- 2009–2010: Texas Southern (assistant)
- 2013–2016: Prairie View A&M (assistant)
- 2016–present: Prairie View A&M

Head coaching record
- Overall: 147–179 (.451)
- Tournaments: 1–2 (NCAA Division I)

Accomplishments and honors

Championships
- 2 SWAC tournament (2019, 2026); 3 SWAC regular season (2019–2021)

Awards
- Hugh Durham Award (2021); 3× SWAC Coach of the Year (2019–2021)

Byron Smith (born September 26, 1969) is an American college basketball coach, currently head coach at Prairie View A&M.

== Playing career ==
Smith started off his college career at Northwestern State for one season before transferring to Tyler Junior College, then completing his collegiate career at Houston under Pat Foster, where he was a two-time All-Southwest Conference selection.

After graduation, Smith played professionally in Australia, Turkey, and Greece.

== Coaching career ==
Smith returned to his alma mater as an assistant coach under Clyde Drexler from 1998 to 2000, before joining the staff at Texas Southern for one season. After a one-year assistant coaching stop at McLennan Community College, Smith became the head coach of the Harlem Globetrotters from 2002 to 2003. After his time with the Globetrotters, Smith coached AAU basketball and ran basketball skills camps in the Houston area.

In 2007, Smith returned to the collegiate coaching ranks joining Mark Turgeon's staff at Texas A&M for two seasons, followed by another one-year stint at Texas Southern. He was named an assistant coach at Prairie View A&M under Byron Rimm II. When Rimm resigned on January 26, 2016, Smith was elevated to the interim head coaching position, and subsequently was named the permanent head coach at the conclusion of the season.

== Head coaching record ==
=== NCAA DI ===
Record table
Season	Team	Overall	Conference	Standing	Postseason
Prairie View A&M Panthers (Southwestern Athletic Conference) (2016–present)
2015–16	Prairie View A&M	6–6^{‡}	6–5	6th	
2016–17	Prairie View A&M	13–20	10–8	T–3rd	
2017–18	Prairie View A&M	16–18	12–6	T–2nd	
2018–19	Prairie View A&M	22–13	17–1	1st	NCAA Division I First Four
2019–20	Prairie View A&M	19–13	14–4	1st	No postseason held
2020–21	Prairie View A&M	16–5	13–0	T–1st	
2021–22	Prairie View A&M	8–19	8–10	8th	
2022–23	Prairie View A&M	13–19	9–9	6th	
2023–24	Prairie View A&M	10–21	5–13	10th	
2024–25	Prairie View A&M	5–27	4–14	10th	
2025–26	Prairie View A&M	19–18	9–9	8th	NCAA Division I Round of 64
2026–27	Prairie View A&M	0–0	0–0		
Prairie View A&M:		147–179 (.451)	107–79 (.575)	‡ Rimm II resigned 1/26/16; Smith coached rest of season.	
Total:		147–179 (.451)			
National champion Postseason invitational champion Conference regular season champion Conference regular season and conference tournament champion Division regular season champion Division regular season and conference tournament champion Conference tournament champion
