= Gateway Center Arena =

Indoor arena in suburban Atlanta

Gateway Center at College Park

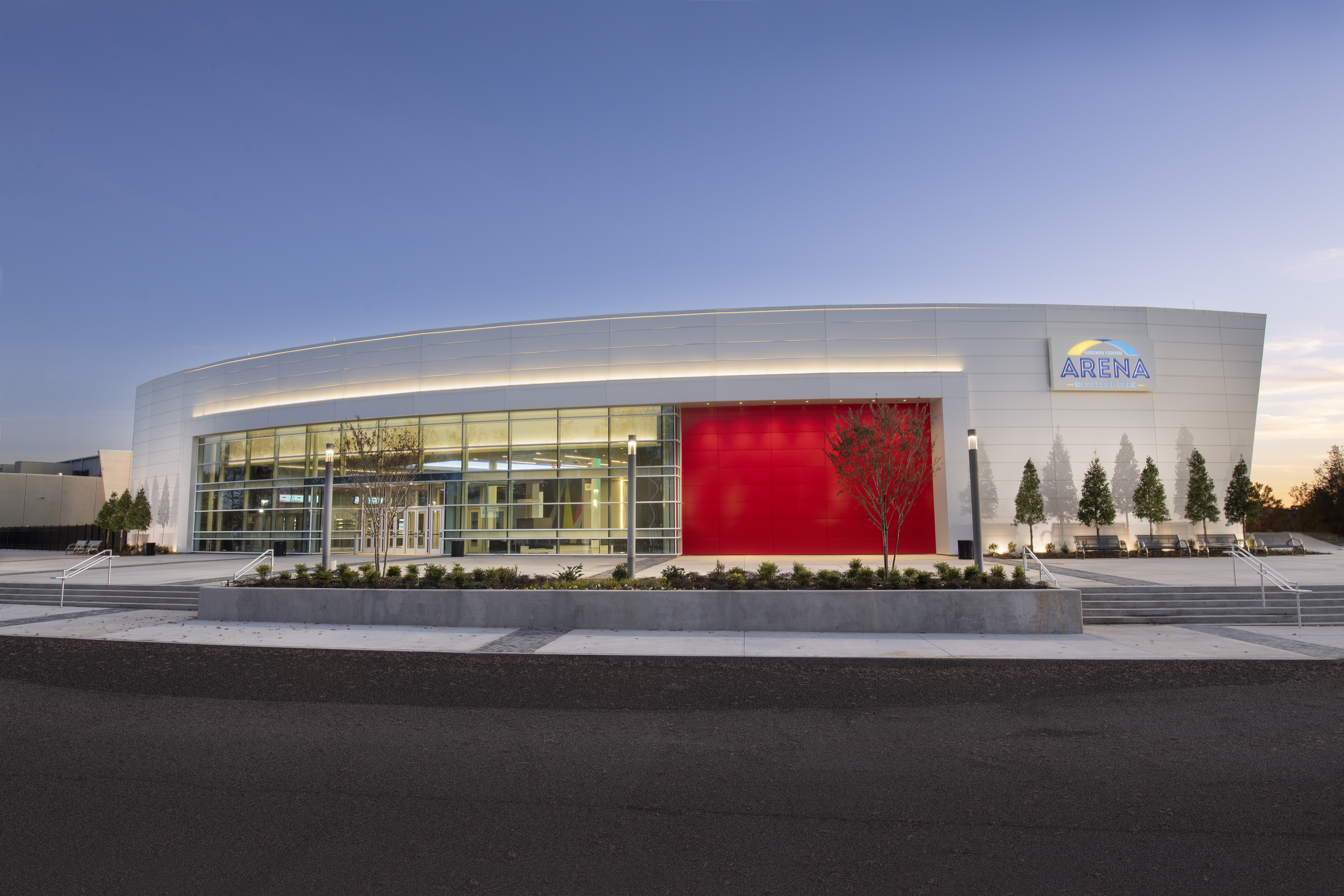

- Location within Georgia Location within the United States
- Address: 2330 Convention Center Concourse
- Location: College Park, Georgia, U.S.
- Coordinates: 33.646800°N 84.459616°W
- Owner: College Park, Georgia
- Capacity: 5,000 (concerts); 3,500 (basketball/volleyball)

Construction
- Groundbreaking: February 2018
- Opened: November 9, 2019
- Cost: $45 million
- Architects: TVS Design; Rosser International

Tenants
- College Park Skyhawks (NBAGL) (2019–present); Atlanta Dream (WNBA) (2021–2026); LOVB Atlanta (League One Volleyball Pro) (2025–present)

Website
- gatewaycenterarena.com

Gateway Center Arena at College Park is a 100,000 square foot (9,290 m^{2}) multi-purpose arena in College Park, Georgia. It is the home venue of the College Park Skyhawks of the NBA G League, LOVB Atlanta of League One Volleyball Pro, and served as the home to the Atlanta Dream of the Women's National Basketball Association from 2021 until the 2026 season.

The arena's first public event was an open house on November 9, 2019, while the Skyhawks' first game at the arena took place on November 21.

== Location and design ==
The 3,500-seat arena is mainly used for basketball; however, there are plans for the facility to also host concerts and other events. It is located adjacent to the Georgia International Convention Center.

Events and tenants
Preceded by State Farm Arena	Home of the Atlanta Dream; 2021–present	Succeeded by current
