= 2026–27 Horizon League men's basketball season =

- League: NCAA Division I
- Sport: Men's basketball
- Teams: 12
- TV partner(s): ESPN+ ESPN2; ESPNU; ESPN

Regular season

Tournament

Basketball seasons
- ← 2025–26 2027–28 →

2026–27 Horizon League men's basketball standings
	Conf.				Overall
Team	W		L	PCT	W		L	PCT
Wright State	0	–	0	–	3	–	0	1.000
IU Indy	0	–	0	–	2	–	0	1.000
Green Bay	0	–	0	–	2	–	2	.500
Northern Kentucky	0	–	0	–	2	–	2	.500
Purdue Fort Wayne	0	–	0	–	1	–	1	.500
Cleveland State	0	–	0	–	1	–	2	.333
Milwaukee	0	–	0	–	1	–	2	.333
Northern Illinois	0	–	0	–	1	–	2	.333
Youngstown State	0	–	0	–	1	–	2	.333
Detroit Mercy*	0	–	0	–	0	–	2	.000
Robert Morris	0	–	0	–	0	–	2	.000
Oakland	0	–	0	–	0	–	4	.000
† 2027 Horizon League tournament winner * Ineligible for both the 2027 NCAA Tournament and Horizon tournament due to APR penalties. As of November 12, 2026; Rankings from AP poll

The 2026–27 Horizon League men's basketball season will begin with practices in September 2026 and end with the 2027 Horizon League men's basketball tournament in March 2027. This is the 47th season for Horizon League men's basketball, and the first with 12 teams since the 2021–22 season, as Northern Illinois rejoined the conference after departing in 1997.

== Head coaches ==
=== Coaching changes ===
- On March 7, 2026, prior to joining the Horizon League, Northern Illinois fired head coach Rashon Burno following five seasons and a combined 39–85. On March 17, the Huskies hired Division II Northern Michigan head coach Matt Majkrzak to replace Burno.

=== Coaches ===
Team	Head coach	Previous job	Season	Overall record	Horizon record	NCAA Tournaments
Cleveland State	Rob Summers	Missouri (asst.)	2nd	11–22 (.333)	6–14 (.300)	0
Detroit Mercy	Mark Montgomery	Michigan State (asst.)	3rd	25–39 (.391)	16–24 (.400)	0
Green Bay	Doug Gottlieb	none	3rd	22–43 (.338)	14–26 (.350)	0
IU Indy	Ben Howlett	West Liberty	2nd	7–25 (.219)	3–17 (.150)	0
Milwaukee	Bart Lundy	Queens	5th	75–58 (.564)	48–32 (.600)	0
Northern Illinois	Matt Majkrzak	Northern Michigan	1st	0–0 (–)	0–0 (–)	0
Northern Kentucky	Darrin Horn	Texas (asst.)	8th	134–90 (.598)	85–51 (.625)	2
Oakland	Greg Kampe	Toledo (asst.)	43rd	726–560 (.565)	140–89 (.611)	1
Purdue Fort Wayne	Jon Coffman	IPFW (asst.)	13th	214–169 (.559)	115–101 (.532)	0
Robert Morris	Andrew Toole	Robert Morris (asst.)	17th	274–252 (.521)	167–127 (.568)	3
Wright State	Clint Sargent	Wright State (asst.)	3rd	38–30 (.559)	23–17 (.575)	1
Youngstown State	Ethan Faulkner	Youngstown State (asst.)	3rd	36–30 (.545)	21–19 (.525)	0

Notes:

- Season number includes 2026–27 season.
- Records are prior to 2026–27 season.

== Preseason ==
=== Preseason coaches poll ===
2026–27 Horizon League Preseason Coaches Poll
Rank	Team	Points
1	Wright State	492
2	Robert Morris	446
3	Green Bay	367
4	Oakland	354
5	Northern Kentucky	336
6	Milwaukee	309
7	Detroit Mercy	271
8	Purdue Fort Wayne	244
9	Youngstown State	192
10	Northern Illinois	142
11	Cleveland State	121
12	IU Indy	80

=== Preseason All-Horizon League ===
First team	Second team
Marcus Hall, Green Bay	Tyler Spratt, Detroit Mercy
Danilo Jovanovich, Milwaukee	Chandler Jackson, Milwaukee
DeAndre Craig Jr., Purdue Fort Wayne	Darius Livingston, Robert Morris
CJ O’Hara, Wright State	Ace Valentine, Robert Morris
Kellen Pickett, Wright State	Dominic Pangonis, Wright State
Preseason Player of the Year: Kellen Pickett, Wright State

== Regular season ==
=== Early-season tournaments ===
On June 24, 2026, the NCAA voted to increase the regular-season game limit from 31 to 32 and eliminate the requirement for teams to participate in multiple-team events (MTEs) or early-season tournaments. The following table summarizes the MTEs or early-season tournaments in which teams from the Horizon League will participate.

Team	Tournament	Location	Dates	Finish
Cleveland State	Alabama A&M MTE	Normal, AL	November 13–15	
Detroit Mercy	Cancún Challenge	Cancún, Mexico	November 24–25	
IU Indy	Youngstown State MTE	Youngstown, OH	November 22–23	
Northern Kentucky	Northern Kentucky MTE	Highland Heights, KY	November 23–25	
Wright State	ESPN Events Invitational	Lake Buena Vista, FL	November 23–27	
Robert Morris	Jacksonville Classic	Jacksonville, FL	November 22–25	
Youngstown State	Youngstown State MTE	Youngstown, OH	November 22–23	

== Postseason ==
=== Horizon League tournament ===
The conference tournament will be played in March 2027, with the championship being played on March 9.

The tournament was originally set to feature 12 teams for the first time since 2022 with the conference's addition of Northern Illinois, but will return to the 11-team format introduced in 2026, as Detroit Mercy is ineligible for postseason play due to Academic Progress Rate violations. After seven years at Corteva Coliseum in Indianapolis, the final three rounds will be played the Riverview Health Arena at Innovation Mile in Noblesville, Indiana, as the first year of a five-year deal with the city of Noblesville, Hamilton County Sports Authority, and REV Entertainment.

Teams are seeded by conference record, with ties broken by record between the tied teams followed by record against the regular-season champion, if necessary.

Play-in; March 1 Campus site
10
11

First round March 4 Campus sites
1
2
9
3
8
4
7
5
6

Second round March 7 Noblesville, IN

Semifinals; March 8 Noblesville, IN

Championship; March 9 Noblesville, IN
