= 2026–27 Jackson State Tigers basketball team =

American college basketball season

2026–27 Jackson State Tigers basketball
- Conference: Southwestern Athletic Conference
- Record: 1–1 (0–0 SWAC)
- Head coach: Trey Johnson (1st season)
- Associate head coach: Darrian Wilson
- Assistant coaches: Tyler Adams; Kydarrius Williams
- Home arena: Williams Assembly Center

2026–27 SWAC men's basketball standings
	Conf.				Overall
Team	W		L	PCT	W		L	PCT
Alabama A&M*	0	–	0	–	2	–	0	1.000
Grambling State	0	–	0	–	1	–	0	1.000
Prairie View A&M	0	–	0	–	2	–	1	.667
Jackson State	0	–	0	–	1	–	1	.500
Alabama State	0	–	0	–	0	–	1	.000
Mississippi Valley State	0	–	0	–	0	–	1	.000
Alcorn State	0	–	0	–	0	–	2	.000
Arkansas–Pine Bluff	0	–	0	–	0	–	2	.000
Florida A&M	0	–	0	–	0	–	2	.000
Texas Southern	0	–	0	–	0	–	2	.000
Bethune–Cookman	0	–	0	–	0	–	3	.000
Southern	0	–	0	–	0	–	3	.000
† 2027 SWAC tournament winner * Ineligible for both the 2027 NCAA Tournament and SWAC tournament due to APR penalties. As of November 9, 2026; Rankings from AP poll

The 2026–27 Jackson State Tigers basketball team represents Jackson State University during the 2026–27 NCAA Division I men's basketball season. The Tigers, led by first-year head coach Trey Johnson, play their home games at the Williams Assembly Center in Jackson, Mississippi, as a member of the Southwestern Athletic Conference.

== Previous season ==
The Tigers finished the 2025–26 season 12–21, 10–8 in SWAC play. As the No. 7 seed in the SWAC tournament, they defeated Grambling State 68–65 before losing to No. 2 seed Florida A&M 70–60 in the quarterfinals.

== Offseason ==
=== Coaching change ===
On March 30, 2026, head coach Mo Williams stepped down after four seasons to join the coaching staff at Kentucky, and associate head coach Trey Johnson was named interim head coach. On April 15, Johnson, the 2006–07 SWAC Player of the Year and a Jackson State Sports Hall of Fame inductee who had spent the previous four seasons as the Tigers' associate head coach, was named the program's head coach.

2025–26 SWAC Player of the Year Daeshun Ruffin, who had announced he would enter the transfer portal after the coaching change, returned to Jackson State for a fifth season.

=== Departures ===
Jackson State departures
Name	Number	Pos.	Height	Weight	Year	Hometown	Reason for Departure
Jalen Tatum	2	G	6'4"	187	(redshirt) Junior	Pine Bluff, Arkansas	Transferred to Arkansas–Pine Bluff
Jayme Mitchell Jr.	3	G/F	6'5"	200	(redshirt) Junior	Jackson, Mississippi	Left the team
Devin Ree	4	F	6'9"	177	Senior	Jackson, Mississippi	Graduated
Keiveon Hunt	5	G	6'0"	184	Senior	Jackson, Mississippi	Graduated
Kedrick Simmons	7	F	6'6"	174	Freshman	Booneville, Mississippi	Left the team
Dionjahe Thomas	8	F	6'8"	236	(redshirt) Junior	Houma, Louisiana	Left the team
Raevon Thomas	20	F	6'9"	217	Senior	Detroit, Michigan	Graduated

=== Incoming transfers ===
Jackson State incoming transfers
Name	Number	Pos.	Height	Weight	Year	Hometown	Previous School
Tyler Husband	2	G	5'11"	163	Junior	Atlanta, Georgia	Albany Tech
AT Manyuon	3	G	6'5"	188	Junior	Austin, Minnesota	Indian Hills CC
Jayden Williams	4	C	6'9"	230	Junior	Chicago, Illinois	Incarnate Word
DJ Davis	6	G	6'2"	195	Junior	Oxford, Mississippi	Itawamba CC
TK Lawson	8	F	6'7"	205	Junior	New Orleans, Louisiana	Lee College
Chip Brunt	10	G	6'5"	168	Senior	Memphis, Tennessee	Northwestern State
Nikk Williams	22	F	6'8"	220	Senior	Dallas, Texas	New Mexico Highlands

=== 2026 recruiting class ===
Jackson State 2026 recruiting class
Name	Number	Pos.	Height	Weight	Hometown	High school
Blake Nettles	0	G	6'2"	190	Pascagoula, Mississippi	Pascagoula High School

== Preseason ==
On October 7, 2026, the SWAC released its preseason poll. Jackson State was picked to finish sixth in the conference while receiving one first-place vote. Daeshun Ruffin was named the SWAC Preseason Player of the Year, and Ruffin and Dorian McMillian were both named to the preseason All-SWAC first team.

=== Preseason rankings ===
SWAC Preseason Poll
Place	Team	Votes
1	Bethune–Cookman	181 (10)
2	Southern	148 (3)
3	Alabama A&M	143
4	Florida A&M	125
5	Prairie View A&M	124
6	Jackson State	105 (1)
7	Alabama State	102 (1)
8	Grambling State	95
9	Texas Southern	75 (1)
10	Alcorn State	61
11	Arkansas–Pine Bluff	57
12	Mississippi Valley State	32
(#) first-place votes

=== Preseason Player of the Year ===
Preseason Player of the Year
Player	Year	Position
Daeshun Ruffin	Graduate student	Guard

=== Preseason All-SWAC Teams ===
Preseason All-SWAC Teams
Team	Player	Year	Position
First	Daeshun Ruffin	Graduate student	Guard
First	Dorian McMillian	Junior	Guard

== Roster ==
2026–27 Jackson State Tigers men's basketball team
Players
Coaches

Pos.	#	Name	Height	Weight	Year	Previous school	Hometown
G	0	Blake Nettles	6 ft 2 in (1.88 m)	190 lb (86 kg)	Fr	Pascagoula High School	Pascagoula, Mississippi
G	1	Dorian McMillian	6 ft 3 in (1.91 m)	180 lb (82 kg)	Jr	Pascagoula High School	Pascagoula, Mississippi
G	2	Tyler Husband	5 ft 11 in (1.8 m)	163 lb (74 kg)	Jr	Albany Tech	Atlanta, Georgia
G	3	AT Manyuon	6 ft 5 in (1.96 m)	188 lb (85 kg)	Jr	Indian Hills CC	Austin, Minnesota
C	4	Jayden Williams	6 ft 9 in (2.06 m)	230 lb (104 kg)	Jr	Incarnate Word	Chicago, Illinois
G/F	5	Tamarion Hoover	6 ft 4 in (1.93 m)	160 lb (73 kg)	Jr	Yazoo City High School	Yazoo City, Mississippi
G	6	DJ Davis	6 ft 2 in (1.88 m)	195 lb (88 kg)	Jr	Itawamba CC	Oxford, Mississippi
C	7	Ebo Wilson	6 ft 10 in (2.08 m)	284 lb (129 kg)	Jr	Ridgeland High School	Accra, Ghana
F	8	TK Lawson	6 ft 7 in (2.01 m)	205 lb (93 kg)	Jr	Lee College	New Orleans, Louisiana
F	9	Deyan Kolev	6 ft 9 in (2.06 m)	205 lb (93 kg)	So	Pierre de Coubertin Sports School	Yambol, Bulgaria
G	10	Chip Brunt	6 ft 5 in (1.96 m)	168 lb (76 kg)	Sr	Northwestern State	Memphis, Tennessee
G	11	Mike Williams	6 ft 2 in (1.88 m)	176 lb (80 kg)	So	Germantown High School	Dallas, Texas
G	12	Delyle Williams	6 ft 3 in (1.91 m)	191 lb (87 kg)	Sr	St. John Bosco High School	Compton, California
G	13	Cael Jones	6 ft 1 in (1.85 m)	149 lb (68 kg)	So	Southaven High School	Southaven, Mississippi
F	21	Kobe Butler	6 ft 7 in (2.01 m)	201 lb (91 kg)	So	Archbishop Shaw High School	Marrero, Louisiana
F	22	Nikk Williams	6 ft 8 in (2.03 m)	220 lb (100 kg)	Sr	New Mexico Highlands	Dallas, Texas
G	24	Daeshun Ruffin	5 ft 10 in (1.78 m)	160 lb (73 kg)	GS	Ole Miss	Jackson, Mississippi

Head coach

- Trey Johnson (Jackson State)

Assistant coach(es)

- Darrian Wilson
- Tyler Adams (Georgetown)
- Kydarrius Williams (Alabama)

Legend

- (C) Team captain
- (S) Suspended
- (I) Ineligible
- (W) Walk-on
- Injured
- Current redshirt

Roster
Last update: November 8, 2026

== Schedule and results ==
Date time, TV	Rank^{#}	Opponent^{#}	Result	Record	High points	High rebounds	High assists	Site (attendance) city, state
Non-conference regular season
November 2, 2026*		at No. 19 Texas Tech	L 42–76	0–1	11 – M. Williams	9 – N. Williams	3 – Ruffin	United Supermarkets Arena (13,087); Lubbock, TX
November 5, 2026*		at Tulane	W 87–85	1–1	23 – McMillian	7 – McMillian	8 – Ruffin	Devlin Fieldhouse (1,077); New Orleans, LA
November 9, 2026*; 6:30 p.m., SEC Network+		at Mississippi State						Humphrey Coliseum; Starkville, MS
November 11, 2026*; 7:00 p.m.		at Southern Miss						Reed Green Coliseum; Hattiesburg, MS
November 14, 2026*; 1:30 p.m.		at Winthrop						Winthrop Coliseum; Rock Hill, SC
November 18, 2026*; 11:00 a.m.		at Baylor						Foster Pavilion; Waco, TX
November 25, 2026*; 2:00 p.m.		at Oklahoma State						Gallagher-Iba Arena; Stillwater, OK
December 2, 2026*; 11:00 a.m.		at Memphis						FedExForum; Memphis, TN
December 8, 2026*; 7:00 p.m.		at Texas						Moody Center; Austin, TX
December 15, 2026*; 7:00 p.m.		at Tulsa						Reynolds Center; Tulsa, OK
December 17, 2026*; 8:00 p.m.		at Oklahoma						Lloyd Noble Center; Norman, OK
December 20, 2026*; 2:00 p.m., ESPN+		at Saint Louis						Chaifetz Arena; St. Louis, MO
December 22, 2026*; 2:00 p.m.		at Louisiana Tech						Thomas Assembly Center; Ruston, LA
December 28, 2026*; 6:00 p.m.		at Ole Miss						SJB Pavilion; Oxford, MS
SWAC regular season
January 2, 2027; 3:00 p.m.		at Alcorn State						Davey Whitney Complex; Lorman, MS
January 9, 2027; 2:30 p.m.		Alabama State						Williams Assembly Center; Jackson, MS
January 11, 2027; 7:00 p.m.		Alabama A&M						Williams Assembly Center; Jackson, MS
January 16, 2027; TBA		at Prairie View A&M						William Nicks Building; Prairie View, TX
January 18, 2027; TBA		at Texas Southern						H&PE Arena; Houston, TX
January 23, 2027; 2:30 p.m.		Bethune–Cookman						Williams Assembly Center; Jackson, MS
January 25, 2027; 7:00 p.m.		Florida A&M						Williams Assembly Center; Jackson, MS
January 30, 2027; TBA		at Grambling State						Fredrick C. Hobdy Assembly Center; Grambling, LA
February 1, 2027; 6:30 p.m.		at Southern						F. G. Clark Center; Baton Rouge, LA
February 6, 2027; 2:30 p.m.		Mississippi Valley State						Williams Assembly Center; Jackson, MS
February 8, 2027; 7:00 p.m.		Arkansas–Pine Bluff						Williams Assembly Center; Jackson, MS
February 13, 2027; 3:00 p.m.		at Florida A&M						Al Lawson Center; Tallahassee, FL
February 15, 2027; TBA		at Bethune–Cookman						Moore Gymnasium; Daytona Beach, FL
February 20, 2027; 3:00 p.m.		Alcorn State						Williams Assembly Center; Jackson, MS
February 25, 2027; 7:00 p.m.		Prairie View A&M						Williams Assembly Center; Jackson, MS
February 27, 2027; 3:00 p.m.		Texas Southern						Williams Assembly Center; Jackson, MS
March 2, 2027; TBA		at Arkansas–Pine Bluff						H.O. Clemmons Arena; Pine Bluff, AR
March 4, 2027; TBA		at Mississippi Valley State						Harrison HPER Complex; Itta Bena, MS
SWAC tournament
March 9–13, 2027; TBA		vs. TBD						Gateway Center Arena; College Park, GA
*Non-conference game. ^{#}Rankings from AP poll. (#) Tournament seedings in parentheses. All times are in Central Time.
