= Crarey =

Crarey is a surname. Notable people with the surname include:

- Patrick Crarey II (born 1983), American basketball coach
- Paul Crarey (born 1966), English rugby league footballer

== See also ==
- Crary (disambiguation)
