= 2026–27 Mississippi Valley State Delta Devils basketball team =

American college basketball season

2026–27 Mississippi Valley State Delta Devils basketball
- Conference: Southwestern Athletic Conference
- Record: 0–5 (0–0 SWAC)
- Head coach: Mike Davis (1st season)
- Associate head coach: Mike Davis Jr.
- Assistant coaches: Bobby Gonzalez; Stevie Taylor; Josh Townsend
- Home arena: Harrison HPER Complex

2026–27 SWAC men's basketball standings
	Conf.				Overall
Team	W		L	PCT	W		L	PCT
Alabama A&M*	0	–	0	–	4	–	2	.667
Alabama State	0	–	0	–	2	–	4	.333
Jackson State	0	–	0	–	2	–	4	.333
Prairie View A&M	0	–	0	–	2	–	4	.333
Grambling State	0	–	0	–	1	–	3	.250
Bethune–Cookman	0	–	0	–	1	–	5	.167
Southern	0	–	0	–	1	–	5	.167
Texas Southern	0	–	0	–	1	–	5	.167
Mississippi Valley State	0	–	0	–	0	–	5	.000
Alcorn State	0	–	0	–	0	–	6	.000
Arkansas–Pine Bluff	0	–	0	–	0	–	6	.000
Florida A&M	0	–	0	–	0	–	6	.000
† 2027 SWAC tournament winner * Ineligible for both the 2027 NCAA Tournament and SWAC tournament due to APR penalties. As of November 21, 2026; Rankings from AP poll

The 2026–27 Mississippi Valley State Delta Devils basketball team represent Mississippi Valley State University during the 2026–27 NCAA Division I men's basketball season. The Delta Devils, led by first-year head coach Mike Davis, will play their home games at the Harrison HPER Complex in Itta Bena, Mississippi as members of the Southwestern Athletic Conference (SWAC).

== Previous season ==
The Delta Devils finished the 2025–26 season 3–30, 2–16 in SWAC play, to finish in 12th (last) place. As the #12 seed in the SWAC tournament, they were defeated by #9 seed Grambling State in the first round.

Following the season, on March 31, 2026, the school announced that they would firing head coach George Ivory, ending his four-year tenure with the program. On April 21, it was announced that the school would be hiring former Detroit Mercy head coach Mike Davis as the team's new head coach.

== Preseason ==
On October 7, 2026, the Southwestern Athletic Conference released their preseason poll. Mississippi Valley State was picked to finish 12th (last) in the conference.

=== Preseason rankings ===
SWAC Preseason Poll
Place	Team	Votes
1	Bethune–Cookman	181 (10)
2	Southern	148 (3)
3	Alabama A&M	143
4	Florida A&M	125
5	Prairie View A&M	124
6	Jackson State	105 (1)
7	Alabama State	102 (1)
8	Grambling State	95
9	Texas Southern	75 (1)
10	Alcorn State	61
11	Arkansas–Pine Bluff	57
12	Mississippi Valley State	32
(#) first-place votes

=== Preseason All-SWAC Teams ===
No players were named to the Preseason All-SWAC First or Second Team.

== Roster ==
2026–27 Mississippi Valley State Delta Devils men's basketball team
Players
Coaches

Pos.	#	Name	Height	Weight	Year	Previous school	Hometown
G	1	Eli Pippins	5 ft 11 in (1.8 m)	160 lb (73 kg)	Jr	Coastal Alabama Community College	Atlanta, Georgia
G	2	AJ Abrams	6 ft 1 in (1.85 m)	—	Jr	South Suburban College	Chicago, Illinois
F	3	Chance Sutton	6 ft 7 in (2.01 m)	205 lb (93 kg)	Sr	Meridian Community College	Dallas, Texas
G	5	Matt Anglo	6 ft 2 in (1.88 m)	170 lb (77 kg)	Jr	Arizona Western College	Waterloo, Ontario
F	7	Tymias Williams	6 ft 7 in (2.01 m)	200 lb (91 kg)	Sr	Rochester Christian	New Baltimore, Michigan
G/F	8	Caleb Cameron	6 ft 5 in (1.96 m)	190 lb (86 kg)	So	Indian River State College	Stone Mountain, Georgia
C	9	Tianhao (Howie) Wu	7 ft 0 in (2.13 m)	—	Fr	St. John Bosco High School	Shandong, China
F	11	Harvey Wilson Jr.	6 ft 7 in (2.01 m)	216 lb (98 kg)	RS Fr	Santa Fe College	Tampa, Florida
F	12	Mykayle McCoy	6 ft 7 in (2.01 m)	215 lb (98 kg)	RS Fr	Lemoore College	Fresno, California
F	13	Qingfang Pang	6 ft 9 in (2.06 m)	245 lb (111 kg)	Jr	Monroe	Flushing, Queens, New York
G	20	Tory James Jr.	6 ft 1 in (1.85 m)	175 lb (79 kg)	So	Cal State Bakersfield	The Woodlands, Texas
PF	21	Gabriel Martinez	6 ft 10 in (2.08 m)	215 lb (98 kg)	Jr	Northwest Florida State College	La Romana, Dominican Republic
G/F	24	Tarique Foster	6 ft 8 in (2.03 m)	195 lb (88 kg)	Sr	Albany	Bronx, New York

Head coach

- Mike Davis (Alabama)

Assistant coach(es)

- Mike Davis Jr. (UAB)
- Bobby Gonzalez (Buffalo State)
- Stevie Taylor (Ohio)
- Josh Townsend (Kutztown)

Legend

- (C) Team captain
- (S) Suspended
- (I) Ineligible
- (W) Walk-on
- Injured
- Current redshirt

Roster
Last update: November 10, 2026

== Schedule and results ==
Date time, TV	Rank^{#}	Opponent^{#}	Result	Record	High points	High rebounds	High assists	Site (attendance) city, state
Non-conference regular season
November 6, 2026*; 7:00 pm, SECN+		at Oklahoma	L 57–84	0–1	19 – Williams	9 – Williams	2 – Tied	McCasland Field House (2,086); Norman, OK
November 9, 2026*; 9:00 pm, BTN		at Washington	L 64–77	0–2	20 – Abrams	8 – Williams	3 – Pippins	Alaska Airlines Arena (4,778); Seattle, WA
November 11, 2026*; 9:00 pm, B1G+		at Oregon	L 66–100	0–3	14 – Martinez	8 – Williams	4 – Pippins	Matthew Knight Arena (4,307); Eugene, OR
November 13, 2026*; 8:30 pm, YouTube		at Oregon State	L 65–81	0–4	16 – Anglo	6 – Tied	5 – Pippins	Gill Coliseum (2,992); Corvallis, OR
November 20, 2026*; 7:00 pm, SECN+		at No. 20 Arkansas	L 48–92	0–5	16 – Cameron	5 – Cameron	4 – Cameron	Bud Walton Arena (19,200); Fayetteville, AR
November 25, 2026*; 9:00 pm, MW+		at New Mexico						The Pit; Albuquerque, NM
December 1, 2026*; 7:00 pm, BTN		at Michigan						Crisler Center; Ann Arbor, MI
December 6, 2026*; 3:00 pm, ESPN+		at North Texas						The Super Pit; Denton, TX
December 8, 2026*; 6:00 pm, truTV		at UConn						Harry A. Gampel Pavilion; Storrs, CT
December 15, 2026*; 6:30 pm, SECN+		at Mississippi State						Humphrey Coliseum; Starkville, MS
December 18, 2026*; 6:30 pm, ESPN+		at Tulane						Devlin Fieldhouse; New Orleans, LA
December 22, 2026*; 3:00 pm, BTN		at Ohio State						Schottenstein Center; Columbus, OH
December 28, 2026*; 6:30 pm, ESPN+		at Texas Tech						United Supermarkets Arena; Lubbock, TX
December 29, 2026*; 6:00 pm, ESPN+		at Baylor						Foster Pavilion; Waco, TX
SWAC regular season
January 2, 2027; 3:00 pm, SWAC TV		at Alabama State						Dunn–Oliver Acadome; Montgomery, AL
January 4, 2027; 7:30 pm, SWAC TV		at Alabama A&M						AAMU Event Center; Huntsville, AL
January 9, 2027; 3:00 pm, SWAC TV		Prairie View A&M						Harrison HPER Complex; Itta Bena, MS
January 11, 2027; 6:30 pm, SWAC TV		Texas Southern						Harrison HPER Complex; Itta Bena, MS
January 16, 2027; SWAC TV		at Bethune–Cookman						Moore Gymnasium; Daytona Beach, FL
January 18, 2027; SWAC TV		at Florida A&M						Al Lawson Center; Tallahassee, FL
January 23, 2027; 7:00 pm, SWAC TV		Grambling State						Harrison HPER Complex; Itta Bena, MS
January 25, 2027; 6:30 pm, SWAC TV		Southern						Harrison HPER Complex; Itta Bena, MS
January 30, 2027; SWAC TV		at Arkansas–Pine Bluff						H.O. Clemmons Arena; Pine Bluff, AR
February 6, 2027; 2:30 pm, SWAC TV		at Jackson State						Williams Assembly Center; Jackson, MS
February 8, 2027; 12:00 pm, SWAC TV		at Alcorn State						Davey Whitney Complex; Lorman, MS
February 13, 2027; 3:00 pm, SWAC TV		Alabama A&M						Harrison HPER Complex; Itta Bena, MS
February 15, 2027; 6:30 pm, SWAC TV		Alabama State						Harrison HPER Complex; Itta Bena, MS
February 18, 2027; SWAC TV		at Prairie View A&M						William Nicks Building; Prairie View, TX
February 20, 2027; SWAC TV		at Texas Southern						H&PE Arena; Houston, TX
February 27, 2027; 3:00 pm, SWAC TV		Arkansas–Pine Bluff						Harrison HPER Complex; Itta Bena, MS
March 2, 2027; 7:30 pm, SWAC TV		Alcorn State						Harrison HPER Complex; Itta Bena, MS
March 6, 2027; 7:30 pm, SWAC TV		Jackson State						Harrison HPER Complex; Itta Bena, MS
SWAC tournament
March 9–13, 2027		vs.						Gateway Center Arena; College Park, GA
*Non-conference game. ^{#}Rankings from AP poll. (#) Tournament seedings in parentheses. All times are in Central.
