= 2026–27 Northern Illinois Huskies men's basketball team =

American college basketball season

2026–27 Northern Illinois Huskies men's basketball
- Conference: Horizon League
- Record: 3–3 (0–0 Horizon)
- Head coach: Matt Majkrzak (1st season)
- Assistant coaches: John-Michael Hughes; Jacob Kurtz; Sean Smith; Charlie Wallrapp; Devin Whitelow
- Home arena: Convocation Center

2026–27 Horizon League men's basketball standings
	Conf.				Overall
Team	W		L	PCT	W		L	PCT
Wright State	0	–	0	–	5	–	0	1.000
IU Indy	0	–	0	–	3	–	2	.600
Purdue Fort Wayne	0	–	0	–	3	–	2	.600
Cleveland State	0	–	0	–	3	–	3	.500
Green Bay	0	–	0	–	3	–	3	.500
Northern Illinois	0	–	0	–	3	–	3	.500
Northern Kentucky	0	–	0	–	3	–	3	.500
Milwaukee	0	–	0	–	2	–	3	.400
Youngstown State	0	–	0	–	2	–	3	.400
Robert Morris	0	–	0	–	1	–	4	.200
Oakland	0	–	0	–	1	–	6	.143
Detroit Mercy*	0	–	0	–	0	–	4	.000
† 2027 Horizon League tournament winner * Ineligible for both the 2027 NCAA Tournament and Horizon tournament due to APR penalties. As of November 20, 2026; Rankings from AP poll

The 2026–27 Northern Illinois Huskies men's basketball team represents Northern Illinois University during the 2026–27 NCAA Division I men's basketball season. The Huskies, led by first-year head coach Matt Majkrzak, play their home games at the Convocation Center in DeKalb, Illinois as members of the Horizon League.

This season marks Northern Illinois' return to the Horizon League for the first time since 1997. The university joined the Mid-American Conference in 1997 and announced its departure following the 2025–26 season to rejoin the Horizon League.

== Previous season ==
The Huskies finished the 2025–26 season 9–21, 4–14 in MAC play, to finish in a tie for last place. They failed to qualify for the MAC tournament, ending their season.

On March 7, 2026, the school announced that head coach Rashon Burno resigned. On March 17, the school named Northern Michigan head coach, Matt Majkrzak, the team's new head coach.

== Roster ==
2026–27 Northern Illinois Huskies men's basketball team
Players
Coaches

Pos.	#	Name	Height	Weight	Year	Previous school	Hometown
G	0	Nino Carter-Smith	6 ft 1 in (1.85 m)	170 lb (77 kg)	Sr	Lake Superior State	Detroit, MI
G	1	Uzziah Buntyn	6 ft 1 in (1.85 m)	180 lb (82 kg)	So	South Dakota	Round Rock, TX
G	2	Colin Hardrick	6 ft 3 in (1.91 m)	180 lb (82 kg)	Sr	Drury	Milwauke, WI
F	3	Tolu Samuels	6 ft 8 in (2.03 m)	205 lb (93 kg)	Sr	Southern Indiana	Chicago, IL
G	4	Cal Klesmit	6 ft 2 in (1.88 m)	190 lb (86 kg)	Sr	Northern Michigan	Neenah, WI
F	5	Mykolas Ivanauskas	6 ft 8 in (2.03 m)	225 lb (102 kg)	Jr	Mercyhurst	Chicago, IL
G	6	Max Weisbrod	6 ft 4 in (1.93 m)	190 lb (86 kg)	GS	Northern Iowa	DeForest, WI
G	7	Izaya Larthridge	6 ft 6 in (1.98 m)	210 lb (95 kg)	Fr	Catholic Central HS	Grand Rapids, MI
G	8	Bennett Basich	6 ft 4 in (1.93 m)	205 lb (93 kg)	Jr	Northern Michigan	Hartland, WI
F	9	Jack Daugherty	6 ft 8 in (2.03 m)	210 lb (95 kg)	Fr	Illinois State	Brookfield, WI
G/F	10	Trevor Polite	6 ft 6 in (1.98 m)	210 lb (95 kg)	So	Northern Michigan	Mequon, WI
G	11	Keller Hanson	6 ft 6 in (1.98 m)	180 lb (82 kg)	So	Northern Michigan	Sauk Rapids, MN
G	14	Nathan Ramus	6 ft 2 in (1.88 m)	185 lb (84 kg)	Fr	Appleton North HS	Appleton, WI
G	15	David Douglas Jr.	6 ft 5 in (1.96 m)	215 lb (98 kg)	Sr	Fresno State	Park Forest, IL
F	32	Brayden Gross	6 ft 7 in (2.01 m)	225 lb (102 kg)	So	Walsh	Louisville, OH
F	70	Akiva McBirney-Griffin	6 ft 9 in (2.06 m)	225 lb (102 kg)	GS	UC Irvine	Hamilton, New Zealand

Head coach

- Matt Majkrzak (Green Bay)

Assistant coach(es)

- John-Michael Hughes (High Point)
- Jacob Kurtz (Florida)
- Sean Smith (Trinity International)
- Charlie Wallrapp (Benedictine)
- Devin Whitelow (Winona State)

Legend

- (C) Team captain
- (S) Suspended
- (I) Ineligible
- (W) Walk-on
- Injured
- Current redshirt

Roster
Last update: November 2, 2026

== Schedule and results ==
Date time, TV	Rank^{#}	Opponent^{#}	Result	Record	High points	High rebounds	High assists	Site (attendance) city, state
Exhibition
October 17, 2026*; 2:00 p.m.		Northern Michigan	W 78–43	–	–	–	–	Convocation Center; DeKalb, IL
October 25, 2026*; 11:00 a.m.		at Toledo	W 79–66	–	–	–	–	Savage Arena; Toledo, OH
Regular season
November 2, 2026*; 2:00 a.m., YouTube		vs. Grambling State; Field of 68 Opening Day Marathon	L 87–89	0–1	15 – Polite	5 – Polite	8 – Weisbrod	Rock Hill Sports & Events Center; Rock Hill, SC
November 5, 2026*; 7:00 p.m., ESPN+		at Tulsa	L 75–94	0–2	21 – Douglas Jr.	4 – Tied	8 – Weisbrod	Reynolds Center (3,080); Tulsa, OK
November 7, 2026*; 7:00 p.m., ESPN+		at Dayton	W 81–76 ^{OT}	1–2	27 – Douglas Jr.	6 – Tied	8 – Weisbrod	UD Arena (13,407); Dayton, OH
November 11, 2026*; 6:00 p.m., ESPN+		Clarke	W 82–43	2–2	14 – Weisbrod	11 – Douglas Jr.	5 – Weisbrod	Convocation Center (1,189); Dekalb, IL
November 14, 2026*; 1:00 p.m., ESPN+		at Bellarmine	W 72–64	3–2	19 – Buntyn	13 – Gross	5 – Weisbrod	Knights Hall (1,025); Louisville, KY
November 18, 2026*; 6:30 p.m., ESPN+		at Marquette	L 65–79	3–3	17 – Douglas Jr.	7 – Douglas Jr.	3 – Tied	Fiserv Forum (12,157); Milwaukee, WI
November 21, 2026*; 1:00 p.m., ESPN+		at Bowling Green						Stroh Center; Bowling Green, OH
November 25, 2026*; 6:00 p.m., ESPN+		at SIU Edwardsville						First Community Arena; Edwardsville, IL
November 28, 2026*; 2:00 p.m., ESPN+		at Eastern Illinois						Groniger Arena; Charleston, IL
December 3, 2026; 6:30 p.m., ESPN+		at Green Bay						Kress Center; Green Bay, WI
December 5, 2026; 2:00 p.m., ESPN+		Milwaukee						Convocation Center; DeKalb, IL
December 12, 2026*; 1:00 p.m., ESPN+		at Lindenwood						Robert F. Hyland Arena; St. Charles, MO
December 19, 2026*; 2:00 p.m., ESPN+		Eastern Illinois						Convocation Center; DeKalb, IL
December 21, 2026*; 8:00 p.m., CBSSN		at Arizona						McKale Center; Tucson, AZ
December 30, 2026; 3:00 p.m., ESPN+		at Youngstown State						Beeghly Center; Youngstown, OH
January 3, 2027; 1:00 p.m., ESPN+		at Robert Morris						UPMC Events Center; Moon Township, PA
January 7, 2027; 8:00 p.m., ESPN+		Cleveland State						Convocation Center; DeKalb, IL
January 9, 2027; 2:00 p.m., ESPN+		Wright State						Convocation Center; DeKalb, IL
January 14, 2027; 6:00 p.m., ESPN+		at Detroit Mercy						Calihan Hall; Detroit, MI
January 17, 2027; 2:00 p.m., ESPN+		Green Bay						Convocation Center; DeKalb, IL
January 21, 2027; 6:00 p.m., ESPN+		at Northern Kentucky						Truist Arena; Highland Heights, KY
January 23, 2027; 1:00 p.m., ESPN+		at Wright State						Nutter Center; Fairborn, OH
January 27, 2027; 6:00 p.m., ESPN+		Oakland						Convocation Center; DeKalb, IL
January 30, 2027; 3:00 p.m., ESPN+		at Milwaukee						UW-Milwaukee Panther Arena; Milwaukee, WI
February 4, 2027; 5:30 p.m., ESPN+		at IU Indy						James T. Morris Arena; Indianapolis, IN
February 7, 2027; 2:00 p.m., ESPN+		Northern Kentucky						Convocation Center; DeKalb, IL
February 10, 2027; 6:00 p.m., ESPN+		Youngstown State						Convocation Center; DeKalb, IL
February 13, 2027; 1:00 p.m., ESPN+		at Purdue Fort Wayne						Gates Sports Center; Fort Wayne, IN
February 17, 2027; 6:00 p.m., ESPN+		Detroit Mercy						Convocation Center; DeKalb, IL
February 21, 2027; 2:00 p.m., ESPN+		Robert Morris						Convocation Center; DeKalb, IL
February 24, 2027; 6:00 p.m., ESPN+		at Cleveland State						Wolstein Center; Cleveland, OH
February 27, 2027; 4:30 p.m., ESPN+		IU Indy						Convocation Center; DeKalb, IL
Horizon League tournament
March 1–4, 2027; TBA		vs. TBD						TBD; TBD
*Non-conference game. ^{#}Rankings from AP poll. (#) Tournament seedings in parentheses. All times are in Central.
