= 2026–27 Milwaukee Panthers men's basketball team =

American college basketball season

2026–27 Milwaukee Panthers men's basketball
- Conference: Horizon League
- Record: 2–4 (0–0 Horizon)
- Head coach: Bart Lundy (5th season)
- Assistant coaches: Julian Swartz; Ben Walker; Jose Winston; Mike Winans
- Home arena: UW–Milwaukee Panther Arena; Klotsche Center

2026–27 Horizon League men's basketball standings
	Conf.				Overall
Team	W		L	PCT	W		L	PCT
Wright State	0	–	0	–	5	–	0	1.000
IU Indy	0	–	0	–	3	–	2	.600
Purdue Fort Wayne	0	–	0	–	4	–	2	.667
Northern Illinois	0	–	0	–	4	–	3	.571
Northern Kentucky	0	–	0	–	3	–	3	.500
Cleveland State	0	–	0	–	3	–	4	.429
Green Bay	0	–	0	–	3	–	4	.429
Youngstown State	0	–	0	–	2	–	3	.400
Milwaukee	0	–	0	–	2	–	4	.333
Robert Morris	0	–	0	–	1	–	4	.200
Oakland	0	–	0	–	1	–	7	.125
Detroit Mercy*	0	–	0	–	0	–	5	.000
† 2027 Horizon League tournament winner * Ineligible for both the 2027 NCAA Tournament and Horizon tournament due to APR penalties. As of November 22, 2026; Rankings from AP poll

The 2026–27 Milwaukee Panthers men's basketball team will represent the University of Wisconsin–Milwaukee during the 2026–27 NCAA Division I men's basketball season. The Panthers, led by fifth-year head coach Bart Lundy, play their home games at the UW–Milwaukee Panther Arena in Milwaukee, Wisconsin, and select games at the on-campus Klotsche Center as members of the Horizon League.

== Previous season ==
The Panthers finished the 2025–26 season tied for eighth place in the Horizon League with a record of 12–20, including 8–12 in conference play, their first losing season under Bart Lundy. In the first round of the Horizon League tournament, they were defeated by third-seeded Detroit Mercy, 84–63.

== Offseason ==
=== Departures ===
Milwaukee departures
Name	No.	Pos.	Ht.	Wt.	Year	Hometown	Reason for departure
Amar Aguillard	1	G	6'5"	225	RS Senior	Zion, IL	Graduated
Josh Dixon	2	G	6'1"	160	Freshman	Charlotte, NC	Transferred to Georgia Southern
Stevie Elam	8	G	6'3"	200	Freshman	Adrian, MI	Transferred to Miami (OH)
Seth Hubbard	11	F	6'7"	225	RS Junior	Indianapolis, IN	Transferred to Hampton
Faizon Fields	22	F	6'10"	220	Graduate Student	Memphis, TN	Graduated
Esyah Pippa-White	24	G	6'2"	180	Junior	Portland, OR	Transferred to Houston Christian
Sekou Konneh	25	F	6'9"	215	RS Freshman	Milwaukee, WI	Transferred to San Diego
Aaron Franklin	29	G	6'5"	210	RS Senior	Kansas City, MO	Graduated
Tate Mackenzie	34	F	6'10"	260	Junior	Ypsilanti, MI	Left program

=== Incoming transfers ===
Milwaukee incoming transfers
Name	No.	Pos.	Ht.	Wt.	Year	Hometown	Previous school
Tre Norman	5	G	6'3"	205	Senior	Dorchester, MA	Marquette
Jake Hansen	4	G	6'1"	185	Sophomore	Wauwatosa, WI	Oklahoma
Dylan Omweno	7	G	6'2"	165	Junior	Minneapolis, MN	Trinidad State College
Al Amadou	21	F	6'9"	213	RS Junior	Philadelphia, PA	Saint Joseph's
Nate Malosa	35	F	6'10"	240	Sophomore	Raleigh, NC	Columbia State CC

=== 2026 recruiting class ===
College recruiting
Name	Hometown	School	Height	Weight	Commit date
Braylon Walker; G	Gurnee, IL	Warren Township High School	6 ft 0 in (1.83 m)	200 lb (91 kg)	Apr 12, 2026
Braylon Walker; G	Recruit ratings: No ratings found				
Amare Hereford; G	Beloit, WI	Beloit Memorial High School	6 ft 2 in (1.88 m)	175 lb (79 kg)	Apr 2, 2026
Amare Hereford; G	Recruit ratings: No ratings found				
SJ Young; G	Willis, TX	Willis High School (TX)	6 ft 5 in (1.96 m)	170 lb (77 kg)	Sep 14, 2025
SJ Young; G	Recruit ratings: No ratings found				
Ben Okoro; F	O'Fallon, IL	O'Fallon Township High School	6 ft 8 in (2.03 m)	205 lb (93 kg)	Oct 7, 2025
Ben Okoro; F	Recruit ratings: No ratings found				
Overall recruit ranking:
Note: In many cases, Scout, Rivals, 247Sports, On3, and ESPN may conflict in their listings of height and weight.; In these cases, the average was taken. ESPN grades are on a 100-point scale.; Sources: "2026 Team Ranking". Rivals.

== Roster ==
2026–27 Milwaukee Panthers men's basketball team
Players
Coaches

Pos.	#	Name	Height	Weight	Year	Previous school	Hometown
G	0	Braylon Walker	6 ft 4 in (1.93 m)	195 lb (88 kg)	Fr	Warren Township HS	Gurnee, IL
G	1	Amare Hereford	6 ft 1 in (1.85 m)	165 lb (75 kg)	Fr	Beloit Memorial HS	Beloit, WI
G	2	Isaiah Dorceus	6 ft 0 in (1.83 m)	180 lb (82 kg)	Sr	Daytona State	Orlando, FL
F	3	Danilo Jovanovich	6 ft 8 in (2.03 m)	227 lb (103 kg)	RS Sr	Louisville	Milwaukee, WI
G	4	Jake Hansen	6 ft 1 in (1.85 m)	185 lb (84 kg)	So	Oklahoma	Wauwatosa, WI
G	5	Tre Norman	6 ft 3 in (1.91 m)	205 lb (93 kg)	Sr	Marquette	Dorchester, MA
G	6	SJ Young	6 ft 5 in (1.96 m)	170 lb (77 kg)	Fr	Willis HS (TX)	Willis, TX
G	7	Dylan Omweno	6 ft 2 in (1.88 m)	165 lb (75 kg)	Jr	Trinidad State	Minneapolis, MN
F	8	Ben Okoro	6 ft 8 in (2.03 m)	205 lb (93 kg)	Fr	O'Fallon Township HS	O'Fallon, IL
F	9	Simeon Murchison (W)	6 ft 9 in (2.06 m)	221 lb (100 kg)	RS Jr	Milwaukee Hamilton HS	Milwaukee, WI
F	11	Chandler Jackson	6 ft 7 in (2.01 m)	225 lb (102 kg)	RS Sr	Parkland	Indianapolis, IN
F	21	Al Amadou	6 ft 9 in (2.06 m)	213 lb (97 kg)	RS Jr	Saint Joseph's	Philadelphia, PA
G	22	John Lovelace Jr.	6 ft 8 in (2.03 m)	215 lb (98 kg)	RS Sr	Youngstown State	Milwaukee, WI
G	24	Aaron Womack III	6 ft 5 in (1.96 m)	195 lb (88 kg)	Fr	Syracuse	Milwaukee, WI
F	35	Nate Malosa	6 ft 10 in (2.08 m)	240 lb (109 kg)	So	Columbia State CC	Raleigh, NC

Head coach

- Bart Lundy (Lenoir–Rhyne)

Assistant coach(es)

- Julian Swartz (Carroll)
- Ben Walker (Creighton)
- Jose Winston (Milwaukee)
- Mike Winans (North Central (IL))

Legend

- (C) Team captain
- (S) Suspended
- (I) Ineligible
- (W) Walk-on
- Injured
- Current redshirt

Roster
Last update: November 13, 2026

== Schedule and results ==
Date time, TV	Rank^{#}	Opponent^{#}	Result	Record	High points	High rebounds	High assists	Site (attendance) city, state
Exhibition
October 28, 2026*; 6:00 p.m.		Luther	W 96–40	–	–	–	–	Klotsche Center; Milwaukee, WI
Regular season
November 2, 2026*; 9:30 p.m., B1G+		at No. 21 USC	L 63–95	0–1	14 – Hereford	5 – Tied	3 – Jackson	Galen Center (4,559); Los Angeles, CA
November 4, 2026*; 9:00 p.m., ESPN+		at Santa Clara	L 72–95	0–2	14 – Womack III	12 – Akoro	5 – Norman	Leavey Center (1,040); Santa Clara, CA
November 8, 2026*; 12:00 p.m., ESPN+		Ripon	W 99–48	1–2	17 – Hansen	11 – Malosa	8 – Hereford	Klotsche Center (1,392); Milwaukee, WI
November 11, 2026*; 6:00 p.m., ESPN+		at Indiana State	W 82–73	2–2	23 – Hereford	7 – Tied	6 – Hereford	Hulman Center (4,217); Terre Haute, IN
November 13, 2026*; 7:00 p.m., ESPN+		at TCU	L 64–76	2–3	18 – Hereford	10 – Jovanovich	5 – Hereford	Schollmaier Arena (4,765); Fort Worth, TX
November 21, 2026*; 2:00 p.m., ESPN+		St. Thomas	L 70–98	2–4	21 – Norman	5 – Tied	4 – Hereford	UW-Milwaukee Panther Arena (1,993); Milwaukee, WI
November 24, 2026*; 6:00 p.m., SECN+		at Florida						O'Connell Center; Gainesville, FL
November 29, 2026*; 1:00 p.m., USA		at Oregon State						Gill Coliseum; Corvallis, OR
December 3, 2026; 7:00 p.m., ESPN+		Wright State						UW-Milwaukee Panther Arena; Milwaukee, WI
December 5, 2026; 2:00 p.m., ESPN+		at Northern Illinois						Convocation Center; DeKalb, IL
December 8, 2026*; 7:00 p.m., SLN		at South Dakota State						First Bank & Trust Arena; Brookings, SD
December 12, 2026*; 2:00 p.m., ESPN+		UIC						UW-Milwaukee Panther Arena; Milwaukee, WI
December 15, 2026*; 7:00 p.m., ESPN+		at Little Rock						Jack Stephens Center; Little Rock, AR
December 21, 2026*; 4:00 p.m., SECN+		at Vanderbilt						Memorial Gymnasium; Nashville, TN
December 30, 2026; 6:00 p.m., ESPN+		at Detroit Mercy						Calihan Hall; Detroit, MI
January 3, 2027; 2:00 p.m., ESPN+		at Oakland						OU Credit Union O'rena; Rochester, MI
January 7, 2027; 7:00 p.m., ESPN+		Purdue Fort Wayne						UW-Milwaukee Panther Arena; Milwaukee, WI
January 9, 2027; 7:00 p.m., ESPN+		Northern Kentucky						UW-Milwaukee Panther Arena; Milwaukee, WI
January 14, 2027; 6:00 p.m., ESPN+		at Cleveland State						Wolstein Center; Cleveland, OH
January 17, 2027; 2:00 p.m., ESPN+		Youngstown State						UW-Milwaukee Panther Arena; Milwaukee, WI
January 20, 2027; 7:00 p.m., ESPN+		Oakland						UW-Milwaukee Panther Arena; Milwaukee, WI
January 23, 2027; 1:00 p.m., ESPN+		at Green Bay						Kress Events Center; Green Bay, WI
January 27, 2027; 7:00 p.m.		Robert Morris						UW-Milwaukee Panther Arena; Milwaukee, WI
January 30, 2027; 7:00 p.m.		Northern Illinois						UW-Milwaukee Panther Arena; Milwaukee, WI
February 4, 2027; 6:00 p.m.		at Purdue Fort Wayne						Allen County War Memorial Coliseum; Fort Wayne, IN
February 7, 2027; 2:00 p.m.		Green Bay						UW-Milwaukee Panther Arena; Milwaukee, WI
February 11, 2027; 6:00 p.m., ESPN+		at Northern Kentucky						Truist Arena; Highland Heights, KY
February 13, 2027; 6:00 p.m., ESPN+		at Wright State						Nutter Center; Fairborn, OH
February 19, 2027; 7:00 p.m., ESPN+		IU Indy						UW-Milwaukee Panther Arena; Milwaukee, WI
February 21, 2027; 2:00 p.m., ESPN+		Cleveland State						UW-Milwaukee Panther Arena; Milwaukee, WI
February 24, 2027; 6:00 p.m., ESPN+		at Robert Morris						UPMC Events Center; Moon Township, PA
February 27, 2027; 1:00 p.m., ESPN+		at Youngstown State						Beeghly Center; Youngstown, OH
Horizon League tournament
March 2027								
*Non-conference game. ^{#}Rankings from AP Poll. (#) Tournament seedings in parentheses. All times are in Central.
