= 2026–27 Grambling State Tigers men's basketball team =

American college basketball season

2026–27 Grambling State Tigers men's basketball
- Conference: Southwestern Athletic Conference
- Record: 1–2 (0–0 SWAC)
- Head coach: Patrick Crarey (2nd season)
- Associate head coach: Tyrone Levett
- Assistant coaches: Aaron Proctor; AJ Register; Desmin Wade
- Home arena: Fredrick C. Hobdy Assembly Center

2026–27 SWAC men's basketball standings
	Conf.				Overall
Team	W		L	PCT	W		L	PCT
Alabama A&M*	0	–	0	–	3	–	2	.600
Alabama State	0	–	0	–	2	–	3	.400
Jackson State	0	–	0	–	2	–	4	.333
Prairie View A&M	0	–	0	–	2	–	4	.333
Grambling State	0	–	0	–	1	–	3	.250
Bethune–Cookman	0	–	0	–	1	–	5	.167
Southern	0	–	0	–	1	–	5	.167
Texas Southern	0	–	0	–	1	–	5	.167
Mississippi Valley State	0	–	0	–	0	–	4	.000
Alcorn State	0	–	0	–	0	–	6	.000
Arkansas–Pine Bluff	0	–	0	–	0	–	6	.000
Florida A&M	0	–	0	–	0	–	6	.000
† 2027 SWAC tournament winner * Ineligible for both the 2027 NCAA Tournament and SWAC tournament due to APR penalties. As of November 21, 2026; Rankings from AP poll

The 2026–27 Grambling State Tigers men's basketball team is representing Grambling State University during the 2026–27 NCAA Division I men's basketball season. The Tigers, are led by second-year head coach Patrick Crarey, will play their home games at the Fredrick C. Hobdy Assembly Center in Grambling, Louisiana as members of the Southwestern Athletic Conference.

== Previous season ==
The Tigers finished the 2025-26 season 14–19, 7–11 in SWAC play. As the nine seed in the SWAC Tournament, they defeated the twelve seed Mississippi Valley State in the first round before losing to Jackson State in the second round.

== Preseason ==
On October 7, 2026, the SWAC released its preseason poll. Grambling was predicted to finish 8th place in the conference.

=== Preseason rankings ===
SWAC Preseason Poll
Place	Team	Votes
1	Bethune–Cookman	181 (10)
2	Southern	148 (3)
3	Alabama A&M	143
4	Florida A&M	125
5	Prairie View A&M	124
6	Jackson State	105 (1)
7	Alabama State	102 (1)
8	Grambling State	95
9	Texas Southern	75 (1)
10	Alcorn State	61
11	Arkansas–Pine Bluff	57
12	Mississippi Valley State	32
(#) first-place votes

=== Preseason All-SWAC Teams ===
No players were named to the Preseason All-SWAC First or Second Team.

== Roster ==
2026–27 Grambling State Tigers men's basketball team
Players
Coaches

Pos.	#	Name	Height	Weight	Year	Previous school	Hometown
G/F	0	Antonio Shannon	6 ft 6 in (1.98 m)	200 lb (91 kg)	So	Kilgore College	Mansfield, Louisiana
G/F	1	Tyler Bey	6 ft 9 in (2.06 m)	200 lb (91 kg)	Jr	Florida SouthWestern State College	Williamstown, New Jersey
G/F	2	Antoine Shannon	6 ft 6 in (1.98 m)	215 lb (98 kg)	So	Kilgore College	Mansfield, Louisiana
G	3	Grigorije Avramovic	6 ft 6 in (1.98 m)	—	Jr	New Mexico Junior College	Pančevo, Serbia
G	4	Brandon Hardy	6 ft 2 in (1.88 m)	205 lb (93 kg)	Sr	Southern	Zachary, Louisiana
G	5	Colin Byrd	6 ft 4 in (1.93 m)	180 lb (82 kg)	Fr	Tuscarora High School	Leesburg, Virginia
G	6	Kyle Layton	5 ft 10 in (1.78 m)	180 lb (82 kg)	Sr	Eastern Illinois	McKinney, Texas
F	7	Hassan Washington	6 ft 8 in (2.03 m)	235 lb (107 kg)	Sr	Northern Illinois	Providence, Rhode Island
F	8	Imoh Erims	6 ft 9 in (2.06 m)	235 lb (107 kg)	Fr	Pace Academy	McKinney, Texas
F	9	AJ Barnes	6 ft 6 in (1.98 m)	210 lb (95 kg)	Sr	Southern	Atlanta, Georgia
G	11	Dwayne Pierce	6 ft 5 in (1.96 m)	210 lb (95 kg)	Jr	North Carolina A&T	New York, New York
F	14	Isaiah Miranda	7 ft 2 in (2.18 m)	230 lb (104 kg)	Sr	LIU	Providence, Rhode Island
G	20	Chancellor Perkins	6 ft 2 in (1.88 m)	185 lb (84 kg)	So	Highland High School	Woodbridge, Virginia
F	23	Mekhi Fitts	6 ft 7 in (2.01 m)	230 lb (104 kg)	Sr	Gadsden State Community College	Birmingham, Alabama
G	43	Isaiah Howard	6 ft 2 in (1.88 m)	180 lb (82 kg)	Sr	Benedictine	Seattle, Washington

Head coach

- Patrick Crarey (La Sierra)

Assistant coach(es)

- Tyrone Levett (Alabama State)
- Aaron Proctor (Cal State San Bernardino)
- AJ Register (Alabama)
- Desmin Wade (Washington Adventist)

Legend

- (C) Team captain
- (S) Suspended
- (I) Ineligible
- (W) Walk-on
- Injured
- Current redshirt

Roster
Last update: November 8, 2026

== Schedule and results ==
Date time, TV	Rank^{#}	Opponent^{#}	Result	Record	High points	High rebounds	High assists	Site (attendance) city, state
Non-conference regular season
November 2, 2026*; 2:00 am, YouTube		vs. Northern Illinois; Field of 68 Opening Day Marathon	W 89–87	1–0	29 – Miranda	8 – Miranda	8 – Pierce	Rock Hill Sports & Event Center; Rock Hill, SC
November 9, 2026*; 6:00 pm, SECN		at No. 7 Texas	L 62–93	1–1	13 – Fitts	7 – Anton. Shannon	2 – Tied	Moody Center (10,872); Austin, TX
November 16, 2026*; 6:00 pm, SECN+		at Kentucky	W 88-59	1–2	18 – Miranda	5 – Miranda	4 – Pierce	Rupp Arena (19,155); Lexington, KY
November 19, 2026*; 6:00 pm		Southern Miss						Fredrick C. Hobdy Assembly Center; Grambling, LA
November 23, 2026*; 12:00 pm		Ecclesia						Fredrick C. Hobdy Assembly Center; Grambling, LA
November 25, 2026*; 3:00 pm, ESPN+		at LSU New Orleans						Lakefront Arena; New Orleans, LA
November 29, 2026*; 3:00 pm, ESPN+		at Southern Miss						Reed Green Coliseum; Hattiesburg, MS
December 3, 2026*; 7:00 pm, BET		at Howard						Burr Gymnasium; Washington, D.C.
December 4, 2026*; 5:00 pm, ESPNU		vs. Tennessee State; Chris Paul HBCU Classic						CareFirst Arena; Washington, D.C.
December 9, 2026*; 7:00 pm		Jarvis Christian						Fredrick C. Hobdy Assembly Center; Grambling, LA
December 13, 2026*; 2:00 pm		LSU New Orleans						Fredrick C. Hobdy Assembly Center; Grambling, LA
December 17, 2026*; 7:00 pm, ACCN		at Duke						Cameron Indoor Stadium; Durham, NC
December 21, 2026*; 1:00 pm		Appalachian State						Fredrick C. Hobdy Assembly Center; Grambling, LA
December 28, 2026*; 2:00 pm		Biblical Studies–Houston						Fredrick C. Hobdy Assembly Center; Grambling, LA
SWAC regular season
January 2, 2027		at Prairie View A&M						William Nicks Building; Prairie View, TX
January 4, 2027		at Texas Southern						H&PE Arena; Houston, TX
January 9, 2027; 4:30 pm		Bethune–Cookman						Fredrick C. Hobdy Assembly Center; Grambling, LA
January 11, 2027; 6:30 pm		Florida A&M						Fredrick C. Hobdy Assembly Center; Grambling, LA
January 16, 2027; 5:30 pm		at Southern						F. G. Clark Center; Baton Rouge, LA
January 23, 2027		at Mississippi Valley State						Harrison HPER Complex; Itta Bena, MS
January 25, 2027		at Arkansas–Pine Bluff						H.O. Clemmons Arena; Pine Bluff, AR
January 30, 2027; 4:30 pm		Jackson State						Fredrick C. Hobdy Assembly Center; Grambling, LA
February 1, 2027; 6:30 pm		Alcorn State						Fredrick C. Hobdy Assembly Center; Grambling, LA
February 6, 2027; 2:00 pm		at Alabama State						Dunn–Oliver Acadome; Montgomery, AL
February 8, 2027; 6:00 pm		at Alabama A&M						AAMU Event Center; Huntsville, AL
February 13, 2027; 4:30 pm		Texas Southern						Fredrick C. Hobdy Assembly Center; Grambling, LA
February 15, 2027; 6:30 pm		Prairie View A&M						Fredrick C. Hobdy Assembly Center; Grambling, LA
February 20, 2027; 4:30 pm		Southern						Fredrick C. Hobdy Assembly Center; Grambling, LA
February 25, 2027		at Florida A&M						Al Lawson Center; Tallahassee, FL
February 27, 2027		at Bethune–Cookman						Moore Gymnasium; Daytona Beach, FL
March 2, 2027; 8:30 pm		Alabama A&M						Fredrick C. Hobdy Assembly Center; Grambling, LA
March 4, 2027; 4:30 pm		Alabama State						Fredrick C. Hobdy Assembly Center; Grambling, LA
*Non-conference game. ^{#}Rankings from AP poll. (#) Tournament seedings in parentheses. All times are in Central.
