= 2026–27 Wright State Raiders men's basketball team =

American college basketball season

2026–27 Wright State Raiders men's basketball
- Conference: Horizon League
- Record: 4–0 (0–0 Horizon)
- Head coach: Clint Sargent (3rd season)
- Assistant coaches: Dan Beré; Travis Trice; Jaaron Simmons
- Home arena: Nutter Center

2026–27 Horizon League men's basketball standings
	Conf.				Overall
Team	W		L	PCT	W		L	PCT
Wright State	0	–	0	–	5	–	0	1.000
IU Indy	0	–	0	–	3	–	2	.600
Purdue Fort Wayne	0	–	0	–	3	–	2	.600
Cleveland State	0	–	0	–	3	–	3	.500
Green Bay	0	–	0	–	3	–	3	.500
Northern Illinois	0	–	0	–	3	–	3	.500
Milwaukee	0	–	0	–	2	–	3	.400
Northern Kentucky	0	–	0	–	2	–	3	.400
Youngstown State	0	–	0	–	2	–	3	.400
Robert Morris	0	–	0	–	1	–	3	.250
Oakland	0	–	0	–	1	–	6	.143
Detroit Mercy*	0	–	0	–	0	–	4	.000
† 2027 Horizon League tournament winner * Ineligible for both the 2027 NCAA Tournament and Horizon tournament due to APR penalties. As of November 20, 2026; Rankings from AP poll

The 2026–27 Wright State Raiders men's basketball team represent Wright State University in the 2026–27 NCAA Division I men's basketball season. The Raiders, led by third-year head coach Clint Sargent, play their home games at the Nutter Center near Dayton as a member of the Horizon League.

== Offseason ==
=== Recruits ===
- Noah Lewis, a 6'6" forward out of George Washington High School in Charleston, WV.
- Tahj Martin, a 6'2" guard out of Blake High School in Silver Spring, MD.
- Terrence Hayes Jr., a 6'2" guard from Gary, Indiana
- Landen Northrop, a 6'5" guard from Richland, Washington.

=== Incoming Transfers ===
- Chadlyn Traylor, 6'3" point guard previously at The College of Charleston.
- Sam Johnson, 6'7" forward previously a two-year standout at Cedarville University.
- C.J. O’Hara, 6'4" guard from Horizon League rival Green Bay, 2025-26 3rd team all Horizon League
- Ilija Milijašević, 6'2" sophomore guard from Belgrade, Serbia who most recently played for DePaul.
- Nikola Djapa, 6'11" senior center from Belgrade, Serbia who most recently played for Colorado State.

=== Outgoing Transfers ===
- Michael Cooper, point guard, transferred to California.
- Alex Bruskotter, shooting guard, transferred to Cleveland State.
- TJ Burch, point guard, transferred to Utah.
- Solomon Callaghan, guard, transferred to Utah State.
- Ayden Davis, center, transferred to Ferris State.
- Logan Woods, guard, Raider since 2022-23, transferred to Niagara

== Previous season ==
The 2025-26 Raiders won the Horizon League regular season and the Horizon League Tournament.

== Roster ==
2026–27 Wright State Raiders men's basketball team
Players
Coaches

Pos.	#	Name	Height	Weight	Year	Previous school	Hometown
G	3	Dominic Pangonis	6 ft 7 in (2.01 m)	210 lb (95 kg)	Jr	Stephen F. Austin	Burlington, Ontario
F	4	Kellen Pickett	6 ft 9 in (2.06 m)	225 lb (102 kg)	So	Blackhawk Christian HS	Fort Wayne, IN
G	12	PJ Douglas	6 ft 4 in (1.93 m)	205 lb (93 kg)	RS Fr	Jeffersonville HS	Jeffersonville, IN
G	15	Isaiah Williams	6 ft 3 in (1.91 m)	190 lb (86 kg)	RS Fr	Beavercreek HS	Beavercreek, OH
F	20	Andrea Holden	6 ft 6 in (1.98 m)	220 lb (100 kg)	Jr	Hamilton HS (OH)	Hamilton, OH
G	6	Ilija Milijašević	6 ft 2 in (1.88 m)	190 lb (86 kg)	So	DePaul	Belgrade, Serbia
C	23	Nikola Djapa	6 ft 11 in (2.11 m)	240 lb (109 kg)	Sr	Colorado State	Belgrade, Serbia
G	10	CJ O'Hara	6 ft 4 in (1.93 m)	200 lb (91 kg)	Jr	Green Bay	Minneapolis, MN
F	2	Sam Johnson	6 ft 7 in (2.01 m)	225 lb (102 kg)	Jr	Cedarville	Columbus, OH
G	1	Chadlyn Traylor	6 ft 3 in (1.91 m)	180 lb (82 kg)	So	Charleston	Charlotte, NC
G	0	Terrence Hayes	6 ft 2 in (1.88 m)	180 lb (82 kg)	Fr	21st Century Charter	Gary, IN
F	5	Noah Lewis	6 ft 7 in (2.01 m)	225 lb (102 kg)	Fr	George Washington	Charleston, WV
G	8	Tahj Martin	6 ft 2 in (1.88 m)	190 lb (86 kg)	Fr	Blake HS (MD)	Silver Springs, MD
G	13	Landen Northrop	6 ft 5 in (1.96 m)	205 lb (93 kg)	Fr	Richland HS (WA)	Richland, WA

Head coach

- Clint Sargent (South Dakota State)

Assistant coach(es)

- Dan Beré (Indiana)
- Travis Trice (Butler)
- Jaaron Simmons (Michigan)

Legend

- (C) Team captain
- (S) Suspended
- (I) Ineligible
- (W) Walk-on
- Injured
- Current redshirt

== Schedule and results ==
Date time, TV	Rank^{#}	Opponent^{#}	Result	Record	Site (attendance) city, state
November 2, 2026*; 7:00 p.m., ESPN+		Air Force; Stars, Stripes, and Flight Classic	W 102–71	1–0	Nutter Center (10,500); Fairborn, OH
November 6, 2026; 7:30 p.m., ESPN+		Florida Atlantic	W 97–71	2–0	Nutter Center (3,199); Fairborn, OH
November 10, 2026*; 7:00 p.m., ESPN+		at Toledo	W 76–68	3–0	Savage Arena; Toledo, OH
November 13, 2026*; 8:00 p.m., ESPN+		at Samford	W 90–66	4–0	Pete Hanna Center (1,627); Homewood, AL
November 18, 2026*; 7:30 p.m., ESPN+		Malone	W 77–60	5–0	Nutter Center (2,904); Fairborn, OH
November 23, 2026*; 1:30 p.m., ESPNU		vs. Akron; ESPN Events Invitational Adventure Group			State Farm Field House; Kissimmee, FL
November 24, 2026*; 10:00 a.m., ESPN2		vs. St. Bonaventure; ESPN Events Invitational Adventure Group			State Farm Field House; Kissimmee, FL
November 25, 2026*; 12:30 p.m., ESPN2		vs. Yale; ESPN Events Invitational Adventure Group			State Farm Field House; Kissimmee, FL
December 3, 2026; 8:00 p.m., ESPN+		at Milwaukee			UW–Milwaukee Panther Arena; Milwaukee, WI
December 5, 2026; 2:00 p.m., ESPN+		at Green Bay			Resch Center; Ashwaubenon, WI
December 9, 2026*; 7:00 p.m., ESPN+		Cornerstone			Nutter Center; Fairborn, OH
December 16, 2026*; 7:00 p.m., ESPN+		Stetson			Nutter Center; Fairborn, OH
December 19, 2026*; 2:00 p.m., ESPN+		at Temple			Liacouras Center; Philadelphia, PA
December 22, 2026*; 7:00 p.m., ESPN+		at Miami (OH)			Millett Hall; Oxford, OH
December 30, 2026; 7:00 p.m., ESPN+		at Cleveland State			Wolstein Center; Cleveland, OH
January 3, 2027; 2:00 p.m., ESPN+		Purdue Fort Wayne			Nutter Center; Fairborn, OH
January 6, 2027; 7:00 p.m., ESPN+		IU Indy			Nutter Center; Fairborn, OH
January 9, 2027; 3:00 p.m., ESPN+		at Northern Illinois			Convocation Center; DeKalb, IL
January 14, 2027; 7:00 p.m., ESPN+		Robert Morris			Nutter Center; Fairborn, OH
January 17, 2027; 2:00 p.m., ESPN+		at Northern Kentucky			Truist Arena; Highland Heights, KY
January 21, 2027; 7:00 p.m., ESPN+		Detroit Mercy			Nutter Center; Fairborn, OH
January 23, 2027; 2:00 p.m., ESPN+		Northern Illinois			Nutter Center; Fairborn, OH
January 28, 2027; 7:30 p.m., ESPN+		Cleveland State			Nutter Center; Fairborn, OH
January 31, 2027; 2:00 p.m., ESPN+		at Purdue Fort Wayne			War Memorial Coliseum; Fort Wayne, IN
February 4, 2027; 7:00 p.m., ESPN+		at Oakland			OU Credit Union O'rena; Auburn Hills, MI
February 7, 2027; 1:00 p.m., ESPN+		at Detroit Mercy			Calihan Hall; Detroit, MI
February 11, 2027; 7:00 p.m., ESPN+		Green Bay			Nutter Center; Fairborn, OH
February 13, 2027; 7:00 p.m., ESPN+		Milwaukee			Nutter Center; Fairborn, OH
February 17, 2027; 6:30 p.m., ESPN+		at Youngstown State			Beeghly Center; Youngstown, OH
February 21, 2027; 2:00 p.m., ESPN+		Northern Kentucky			Nutter Center; Fairborn, OH
February 24, 2027; 6:30 p.m., ESPN+		at IU Indy			James T. Morris Arena; Indianapolis, IN
February 27, 2027; 7:00 p.m., ESPN+		Oakland			Nutter Center; Fairborn, OH
*Non-conference game. ^{#}Rankings from AP Poll. (#) Tournament seedings in parentheses. MW=Midwest. All times are in Eastern.
