= 2024–25 Florida A&M Rattlers basketball team =

American college basketball season

2024–25 Florida A&M Rattlers basketball
- Conference: Southwestern Athletic Conference
- Record: 14–17 (10–8 SWAC)
- Head coach: Patrick Crarey II (1st season)
- Assistant coaches: Fred Lymas; LeBrent Walker; Giovonne Woods
- Home arena: Al Lawson Center

2024–25 SWAC men's basketball standings
	Conf.				Overall
Team	W		L	PCT	W		L	PCT
Southern	15	–	3	.833	20	–	12	.625
Jackson State	14	–	4	.778	16	–	18	.471
Bethune–Cookman	13	–	5	.722	17	–	16	.515
Texas Southern	12	–	6	.667	15	–	17	.469
Alabama State †	12	–	6	.667	20	–	16	.556
Alcorn State	11	–	7	.611	11	–	21	.344
Florida A&M	10	–	8	.556	14	–	17	.452
Grambling State	7	–	11	.389	12	–	22	.353
Alabama A&M	6	–	12	.333	10	–	22	.313
Prairie View A&M	4	–	14	.222	5	–	27	.156
Arkansas–Pine Bluff	3	–	15	.167	6	–	25	.194
Mississippi Valley State	1	–	17	.056	3	–	28	.097
† 2025 SWAC tournament winner

The 2024–25 Florida A&M Rattlers basketball team represented Florida A&M University during the 2024–25 NCAA Division I men's basketball season. The Rattlers, led by first-year head coach Patrick Crarey II, played their home games at the Al Lawson Center in Tallahassee, Florida as members of the Southwestern Athletic Conference.

== Previous season ==
The Rattlers finished the 2023–24 season 6–23, 4–14 in SWAC play to finish in eleventh place. They failed to qualify for the SWAC tournament, as only the top eight teams qualify.

On March 20, 2024, the school announced that they would not be renewing the contract of head coach Robert McCullum, ending his seven-year tenure with the Rattlers. On April 17, the school announced the hiring of St. Thomas (FL) head coach Patrick Crarey II as the team's next head coach.

== Roster ==
2024–25 Florida A&M Rattlers men's basketball team
Players
Coaches

Pos.	#	Name	Height	Weight	Year	Previous school	Hometown
G	0	Lenard Taylor Jr.	6 ft 2 in (1.88 m)	195 lb (88 kg)	Jr	Clarendon College	Baltimore, Maryland
F	1	Roderick Coffee III	6 ft 4 in (1.93 m)	200 lb (91 kg)	Jr	Pensacola State	Painesville, Ohio
G	2	Jordan Chatman	6 ft 4 in (1.93 m)	210 lb (95 kg)	Sr	Shelton State CC	Bessemer, Alabama
G	3	Trey Lewis	5 ft 11 in (1.8 m)	175 lb (79 kg)	Jr	Des Moines Area CC	Johnston, Iowa
G	4	Sterling Young	6 ft 1 in (1.85 m)	175 lb (79 kg)	Sr	Charlotte	Queens, New York
G	5	Milton Matthews	6 ft 3 in (1.91 m)	200 lb (91 kg)	GS	St. Thomas (FL)	District Heights, Maryland
F	8	Shaqir O'Neal	6 ft 8 in (2.03 m)	200 lb (91 kg)	RS Jr	Texas Southern	Los Angeles, California
F	10	Kaleb Washington	6 ft 8 in (2.03 m)	210 lb (95 kg)	Jr	Butler CC	Mableton, Georgia
G	12	Miles Hall	6 ft 3 in (1.91 m)	170 lb (77 kg)	Jr	Windermere HS	Windermere, Florida
G	14	Malcolm Stute	6 ft 4 in (1.93 m)	195 lb (88 kg)	Fr	Episcopal HS	Alexandria, Virginia
F	20	Jamine Charles	6 ft 11 in (2.11 m)	220 lb (100 kg)	Jr	Blinn College	St. John's, Antigua
F	22	Tyler Shirley	6 ft 8 in (2.03 m)	210 lb (95 kg)	Sr	Clayton State	Gary, Indiana
G	23	Jocobi Hendricks	6 ft 0 in (1.83 m)	175 lb (79 kg)	RS Sr	IU Southeast	Louisville, Kentucky
F	24	Ja'Derryus Eatmon	6 ft 10 in (2.08 m)	235 lb (107 kg)	GS	Lawson State CC	Birmingham, Alabama
F	35	Saiyd Burnside	6 ft 9 in (2.06 m)	210 lb (95 kg)	RS Jr	Connors State College	Greenville, South Carolina
F	55	Alex Andrews	6 ft 7 in (2.01 m)	200 lb (91 kg)	RS Sr	Ocoee HS	Ocoee, Florida

Head coach

- Patrick Crarey II (La Sierra)

Assistant coach(es)

- Fred Lymas (Shepherd)
- LeBrent Walker (Washington Adventist)
- Giovonne Woods (Central Washington)

Legend

- (C) Team captain
- (S) Suspended
- (I) Ineligible
- (W) Walk-on
- Injured
- Current redshirt

Roster
Last update: December 1, 2024

== Schedule and results ==
Date time, TV	Rank^{#}	Opponent^{#}	Result	Record	High points	High rebounds	High assists	Site (attendance) city, state
Non-conference regular season
November 4, 2024*; 8:00 pm, ESPN+		at TCU	L 59–105	0–1	16 – Young	6 – Eatmon	2 – Tied	Schollmaier Arena (5,127); Fort Worth, TX
November 7, 2024*; 8:00 pm, ACCNX/ESPN+		at SMU	L 73–102	0–2	15 – Young	6 – Shirley	3 – Tied	Moody Coliseum (5,014); University Park, TX
November 11, 2024*; 7:00 pm, B1G+		at Maryland	L 53–84	0–3	10 – Shirley	7 – Shirley	3 – Lewis	Xfinity Center (10,057); College Park, MD
November 19, 2024*; 7:00 pm, SECN+/ESPN+		at No. 21 Florida	L 60–84	0–4	12 – Young	12 – Charles	2 – Young	O'Connell Center (8,005); Gainesville, FL
November 22, 2024*; 5:00 pm		Trinity Baptist	W 110–68	1–4	26 – O'Neal	9 – O'Neal	4 – Tied	Al Lawson Center; Tallahassee, FL
November 29, 2024*; 7:00 pm, ACCNX/ESPN+		at Clemson	L 58–86	1–5	14 – Matthews	6 – Washington	6 – Coffee III	Littlejohn Coliseum (9,000); Clemson, SC
December 3, 2024*; 7:00 pm		Presbyterian	W 66–63	2–5	17 – Young	6 – Chatman	5 – Coffee III	Al Lawson Center (1,088); Tallahassee, FL
December 6, 2024*; 7:00 pm		Trinity	W 130–58	3–5	25 – Young	7 – O'Neal	5 – Lewis	Al Lawson Center (1,021); Tallahassee, FL
December 17, 2024*; 9:00 pm, ESPN+		at Utah	L 59–89	3–6	11 – Washington	7 – Charles	3 – Washington	Jon M. Huntsman Center (6,699); Salt Lake City, UT
December 20, 2024*; 9:00 pm, ESPN+		at BYU	L 57–103	3–7	14 – Young	6 – Coffee III	3 – Tied	Marriott Center (15,544); Provo, UT
December 29, 2024*; 5:00 pm, ESPN+		at Tarleton State	L 60–70	3–8	16 – Young	8 – Washington	3 – Charles	Wisdom Gym (715); Stephenville, TX
SWAC regular season
January 4, 2025; 6:00 pm		Bethune–Cookman	L 55–62	3–9 (0–1)	20 – Matthews	7 – Coffee III	4 – Coffee III	Al Lawson Center (2,709); Tallahassee, FL
January 11, 2025; 6:00 pm		at Southern	L 57–91	3–10 (0–2)	19 – Young	5 – Burnside	2 – Tied	F. G. Clark Center (3,745); Baton Rouge, LA
January 13, 2025; 7:30 pm		at Grambling State	L 72–79	3–11 (0–3)	27 – Matthews	7 – Coffee III	3 – Young	Fredrick C. Hobdy Assembly Center (1,352); Grambling, LA
January 18, 2025; 6:00 pm		Arkansas–Pine Bluff	W 86–76	4–11 (1–3)	37 – Young	10 – Burnside	4 – Tied	Al Lawson Center (910); Tallahassee, FL
January 20, 2025; 7:00 pm		Mississippi Valley State	W 83–53	5–11 (2–3)	23 – Matthews	6 – O'Neal	4 – Young	Al Lawson Center (808); Tallahassee, FL
January 25, 2025; 3:00 pm		at Alcorn State	W 65–64	6–11 (3–3)	19 – Young	10 – Coffee III	5 – Coffee III	Davey Whitney Complex (250); Lorman, MS
January 27, 2025; 7:00 pm		at Jackson State	W 72–62	7–11 (4–3)	18 – Chatman	9 – Washington	4 – Coffee III	Williams Assembly Center (1,285); Jackson, MS
February 1, 2025; 6:00 pm		Alabama A&M	W 95–79	8–11 (5–3)	25 – Matthews	6 – Matthews	5 – Coffee III	Al Lawson Center (1,000); Tallahassee, FL
February 3, 2025; 7:00 pm		Alabama State	L 66–67	8–12 (5–4)	21 – Young	8 – Eatmon	4 – Coffee III	Al Lawson Center (750); Tallahassee, FL
February 8, 2025; 6:00 pm		at Texas Southern	W 66–64	9–12 (6–4)	19 – Matthews	6 – Matthews	3 – Washington	H&PE Arena (5,263); Houston, TX
February 10, 2025; 8:30 pm		at Prairie View A&M	W 78–67	10–12 (7–7)	22 – Young	8 – Chatman	6 – Young	William Nicks Building (704); Prairie View, TX
February 15, 2025; 6:00 pm		Jackson State	W 76–71	11–12 (8–4)	28 – Young	8 – Charles	5 – Coffee III	Al Lawson Center; Tallahassee, FL
February 17, 2025; 7:00 pm		Alcorn State	W 85–76	12–12 (9–4)	26 – Matthews	10 – O'Neal	6 – Coffee III	Al Lawson Center; Tallahassee, FL
February 22, 2025; 4:00 pm		at Alabama State	L 59–60	12–13 (9–5)	23 – Young	8 – Coffee III	4 – Coffee III	Dunn–Oliver Acadome (437); Montgomery, AL
February 24, 2025; 8:00 pm		at Alabama A&M	L 66–77	12–14 (9–6)	31 – Young	6 – Tied	8 – Coffee III	AAMU Event Center (2,121); Huntsville, AL
March 1, 2025; 6:00 pm		Grambling State	W 73–68	13–14 (10–6)	19 – Coffee III	9 – Matthews	4 – Washington	Al Lawson Center; Tallahassee, FL
March 3, 2025; 7:00 pm		Southern	L 70–73	13–15 (10–7)	20 – Young	8 – Washington	3 – Matthews	Al Lawson Center (1,345); Tallahassee, FL
March 8, 2025; 5:30 pm		at Bethune–Cookman	L 75–76	13–16 (10–8)	21 – Matthews	8 – Charles	9 – Coffee III	Moore Gymnasium (992); Daytona Beach, FL
SWAC tournament
March 11, 2025; 8:30 pm, ESPN+	(7)	vs. (10) Prairie View A&M; First round	W 75–66	14–16	23 – Matthews	11 – Washington	9 – Coffee III	Gateway Center Arena (1,200); College Park, GA
March 12, 2025; 8:30 pm, ESPN+	(7)	vs. (2) Jackson State; Quarterfinals	L 76–91	14–17	30 – Coffee III	5 – Tied	5 – Coffee III	Gateway Center Arena (1,284); College Park, GA
*Non-conference game. ^{#}Rankings from AP Poll. (#) Tournament seedings in parentheses. All times are in Eastern.
