= 2027 Horizon League men's basketball tournament =

American college basketball postseason tournament

- Classification: Division I
- Season: 2026–27
- Teams: 11
- Site: Campus sites (Play-in and first round); Riverview Health Arena at Innovation Mile; Noblesville, Indiana (Second round onwards)
- Television: ESPN+, ESPNU, ESPN2, ESPN

2026–27 Horizon League men's basketball standings
| | Conf. | | | | Overall |
| Team | W | | L | PCT | W | | L | PCT |
|---|---|---|---|---|---|---|---|---|
| Cleveland State | 0 | – | 0 | – | 0 | – | 0 | – |
| Detroit Mercy | 0 | – | 0 | – | 0 | – | 0 | – |
| Green Bay | 0 | – | 0 | – | 0 | – | 0 | – |
| IU Indy | 0 | – | 0 | – | 0 | – | 0 | – |
| Milwaukee | 0 | – | 0 | – | 0 | – | 0 | – |
| Northern Illinois | 0 | – | 0 | – | 0 | – | 0 | – |
| Northern Kentucky | 0 | – | 0 | – | 0 | – | 0 | – |
| Oakland | 0 | – | 0 | – | 0 | – | 0 | – |
| Purdue Fort Wayne | 0 | – | 0 | – | 0 | – | 0 | – |
| Robert Morris | 0 | – | 0 | – | 0 | – | 0 | – |
| Wright State | 0 | – | 0 | – | 0 | – | 0 | – |
| Youngstown State | 0 | – | 0 | – | 0 | – | 0 | – |
† 2027 Horizon League tournament winner

The 2027 Horizon League Men's Basketball Tournament will be the final event of the 2026–27 men's basketball season for the Horizon League. It will be held from March 1–9, 2027; play-in and first-round games will be played at the home courts of the higher seeds, with all remaining games at Riverview Health Arena at Innovation Mile in Noblesville, Indiana in the first year of a five-year deal with the Hamilton County Sports Authority and the city of Noblesville. The winner will receive the conference's automatic berth into the NCAA Tournament.

The tournament was originally set to feature 12 teams for the first time since 2022 with the conference's addition of Northern Illinois, but will return to the 11-team format introduced in 2026, as Detroit Mercy is ineligible for postseason play due to Academic Progress Rate violations.

The bracket includes a play-in for the bottom two teams by conference record, then a ten-team first round on campus sites. The five winners then advance to the final three rounds at Riverview Health Arena. The bottom two teams by seeding play in the second round, while the remaining three teams are reseeded into the semifinals, with the winners advancing to the finals.

== Seeds ==
All eligible teams in the conference will participate in the tournament, with the bottom two teams starting in the play-in round. The bracket is reset after each round so that the lowest remaining seed always plays the highest.

| Seed | School | Conf | Tiebreaker |
|---|---|---|---|
| 1 | | − | |
| 2 | | − | |
| 3 | | − | |
| 4 | | − | |
| 5 | | − | |
| 6 | | − | |
| 7 | | − | |
| 8 | | − | |
| 9 | | − | |
| 10 | | − | |
| 11 | | − | |

== Schedule ==
| Game | Time | Matchup | Score | Television |
Play-in – Monday, March 1
| 1 | TBD | No. 11 at No. 10 | – | ESPN+ |
First round – Thursday, March 4
| 2 | TBD | Winner Game 1 at No. 1 | – | ESPN+ |
| 3 | TBD | No. 9 at No. 2 | – | ESPN+ |
| 4 | TBD | No. 8 at No. 3 | – | ESPN+ |
| 5 | TBD | No. 7 at No. 4 | – | ESPN+ |
| 6 | TBD | No. 6 at No. 5 | – | ESPN+ |
Second round – Sunday, March 7 at Riverview Health Arena at Innovation Mile, Noblesville, IN
| 7 | 5:00 pm | TBD vs. TBD | – | ESPN+ |
Semifinals – Monday, March 8 at Riverview Health Arena at Innovation Mile, Noblesville, IN
| 8 | 7:00 pm | TBD vs. Winner Game 7 | – | ESPN2/ESPNU |
| 9 | 9:30 pm | TBD vs. TBD | – | ESPN2/ESPNU |
Championship – Tuesday, March 9 at Riverview Health Arena at Innovation Mile, Noblesville, IN
| 10 | 7:00 pm | Winner Game 8 vs. Winner Game 9 | – | ESPN/ESPN2 |
Play-in and first-round game times are local. Second-round, semifinal and championship game times are Eastern. Rankings denote tournament seed

== Bracket ==
Play-in; March 1 Campus site
10
11

First round March 4 Campus sites
1
2
9
3
8
4
7
5
6

Second round March 7 Noblesville, IN

Semifinals; March 8 Noblesville, IN

Championship; March 9 Noblesville, IN
