= 2026–27 Youngstown State Penguins men's basketball team =

American college basketball season

2026–27 Youngstown State Penguins men's basketball
- Conference: Horizon League
- Record: 2–4 (0–0 Horizon)
- Head coach: Ethan Faulkner (3rd season)
- Associate head coach: Dwaine Osborne
- Assistant coaches: Danny Reese; Anthony Johnson; Mark Richmond
- Home arena: Beeghly Center

2026–27 Horizon League men's basketball standings
	Conf.				Overall
Team	W		L	PCT	W		L	PCT
Wright State	0	–	0	–	5	–	0	1.000
IU Indy	0	–	0	–	3	–	2	.600
Purdue Fort Wayne	0	–	0	–	4	–	2	.667
Northern Illinois	0	–	0	–	4	–	3	.571
Northern Kentucky	0	–	0	–	3	–	3	.500
Cleveland State	0	–	0	–	3	–	4	.429
Green Bay	0	–	0	–	3	–	4	.429
Youngstown State	0	–	0	–	2	–	3	.400
Milwaukee	0	–	0	–	2	–	4	.333
Robert Morris	0	–	0	–	1	–	4	.200
Oakland	0	–	0	–	1	–	7	.125
Detroit Mercy*	0	–	0	–	0	–	5	.000
† 2027 Horizon League tournament winner * Ineligible for both the 2027 NCAA Tournament and Horizon tournament due to APR penalties. As of November 22, 2026; Rankings from AP poll

The 2026–27 Youngstown State Penguins men's basketball team represents Youngstown State University during the 2026–27 NCAA Division I men's basketball season. The Penguins, led by third-year head coach Ethan Faulkner, play their home games at the Beeghly Center in Youngstown, Ohio as members of the Horizon League.

== Previous season ==
The Penguins finished the 2025–26 season 15–17, 8–12 in Horizon League play, to finish tied for ninth place. They were defeated by Robert Morris in the first round of the Horizon League tournament.

== Offseason ==
=== Departures ===
Youngstown State departures
Name	Number	Pos.	Height	Year	Hometown	Reason for departure
Jason Nelson	0	G	5' 10"	RS Senior	Richmond, VA	Graduated/Exhausted eligibility
Cam Polak	1	G	6' 2"	Sixth-year Senior	West Homestead, PA	Graduated; Signed with Nottingham Hoods
Rich Rolf	2	F	6' 7"	RS Junior	Centerville, OH	Transferred to Miami (OH)
Derrick Anderson	3	G	6' 1"	Fifth-year Senior	Boardman, OH	Graduated/Exhausted eligibility
Tyler Robinett	4	F	6' 8"	Sixth-year Senior	Middleton, ID	Graduated
Shaheed Solebo	5	G	6' 4"	RS Freshman	Chicago, IL	Transferred to Triton College (NJCAA)
Drew King	6	G	6' 3"	RS Junior	Phoenix, AZ	Transferred to Northwest Nazarene (DII)
Vlad Salaridze	7	F	6' 7"	Sixth-year Senior	Tbilisi, Georgia	Graduated; Signed with Palmer Basket Mallorca Palma
Bryson Dawkins	9	G	6' 2"	Senior	Dothan, AL	Graduated; Signed with Sigal Prishtina
Imanuel Zorgvol	10	C	7' 0"	Senior	Paramaribo, Suriname	Transferred to Hofstra
Markus Navarra	13	F	6' 8"	Freshman	Saranac Lake, NY	Transferred to Purdue Northwest (DII)
Cris Carroll	15	F	6' 6"	Senior	Tallahassee, FL	Graduated; Signed with Philadelphia 76ers
Connor Swider	21	F	6' 9"	Freshman	Portsmouth, RI	Transferred to Purdue Northwest (DII)
Tae Blackshear	77	G	6' 6"	Junior	Atlanta, GA	Transferred to Niagara

=== Incoming transfers ===
Youngstown State incoming transfers
Name	No.	Pos.	Ht.	Wt.	Year	Hometown	Previous school
Jayden Tyler	0	G	5' 10"	160	Sophomore	Chicago, IL	Wofford
Jermaine Coleman	1	F	6' 7"	205	Senior	Indianapolis, IN	St. Thomas (MN)
Kelvin Amoako	2	C	6' 11"	255	Senior	Westland, MI	UIndy
Jeff Nwankwo	3	G	6' 6"	210	Fifth-year Senior	Oklahoma City, OK	Oklahoma
Linus Holmstrom	4	G	6' 3"	195	Junior	Stockholm, Sweden	VMI
Dom Aekins	7	G	5' 10"	155	Sophomore	Columbus, OH	Duquesne
Jamar Livingston	20	G	6' 3"	190	Senior	Johnson City, TN	Walters State
Japhet Moupadele	59	F	6' 8"	220	Sophomore	Lille, France	San Jose State

=== 2026 recruiting class ===
College recruiting
Name	Hometown	School	Height	Weight	Commit date
Andrew Adcock-Vidouria; G	San Antonio, TX	St. Mary Central Catholic High School	6 ft 2 in (1.88 m)	185 lb (84 kg)	N/A
Andrew Adcock-Vidouria; G	Recruit ratings: No ratings found				
Kaelen Destin; G	The Bronx, NY	Our Saviour Lutheran School	6 ft 0 in (1.83 m)	160 lb (73 kg)	Oct 6, 2025
Kaelen Destin; G	Recruit ratings: No ratings found				
Luka Lokhmanchuk; F	Kyiv, Ukraine	Andrews Osborne Academy	6 ft 9 in (2.06 m)	207 lb (94 kg)	Mar 5, 2026
Luka Lokhmanchuk; F	Recruit ratings: No ratings found				
Jacob Spurlock; G	Boyd County High School	Boyd County, KY	6 ft 4 in (1.93 m)	215 lb (98 kg)	Jul 28, 2025
Jacob Spurlock; G	Recruit ratings: No ratings found				
Elijah Summers-Livingston; F	Mesa, AZ	Arizona Compass Prep	6 ft 7 in (2.01 m)	195 lb (88 kg)	May 12, 2026
Elijah Summers-Livingston; F	Recruit ratings: ESPN: (80)				
Overall recruit ranking:
Note: In many cases, Scout, Rivals, 247Sports, On3, and ESPN may conflict in their listings of height and weight.; In these cases, the average was taken. ESPN grades are on a 100-point scale.; Sources: "2026 Team Ranking". Rivals.

== Preseason ==
On October 7, 2026, the Horizon League released their preseason poll. Youngstown State was picked to finish ninth in the conference. No players were named to the preseason All-Horizon League First or Second Teams.

=== Preseason rankings ===
Horizon League Preseason Coaches Poll
Place	Team	Votes
1	Wright State	492
2	Robert Morris	446
3	Green Bay	367
4	Oakland	354
5	Northern Kentucky	336
6	Milwaukee	309
7	Detroit Mercy	271
8	Purdue Fort Wayne	244
9	Youngstown State	192
10	Northern Illinois	142
11	Cleveland State	121
12	IU Indy	80

== Roster ==
2026–27 Youngstown State Penguins men's basketball team
Players
Coaches

Pos.	#	Name	Height	Weight	Year	Previous school	Hometown
G	0	Jayden Tyler	5 ft 10 in (1.78 m)	160 lb (73 kg)	So	Wofford	Chicago, IL
F	1	Jermaine Coleman	6 ft 7 in (2.01 m)	205 lb (93 kg)	Sr	St. Thomas (MN)	Indianapolis, IN
C	2	Kelvin Amoako	6 ft 11 in (2.11 m)	255 lb (116 kg)	Sr	UIndy	Westland, MI
G	3	Jeff Nwankwo (5Y)	6 ft 6 in (1.98 m)	210 lb (95 kg)	Sr	Oklahoma	Oklahoma City, OK
G	4	Linus Holmstrom	6 ft 3 in (1.91 m)	195 lb (88 kg)	Jr	VMI	Stockholm, Sweden
G	5	Kaelen Destin	6 ft 0 in (1.83 m)	160 lb (73 kg)	Fr	Our Saviour Lutheran School	The Bronx, NY
G	7	Dom Aekins	5 ft 10 in (1.78 m)	155 lb (70 kg)	So	Duquesne	Columbus, OH
G	8	Jaiden Haynes	6 ft 3 in (1.91 m)	185 lb (84 kg)	So	Moravian Prep	Atlanta, GA
F	11	Luka Lokhmanchuk	6 ft 9 in (2.06 m)	207 lb (94 kg)	Fr	Andrews Osborne Academy	Kyiv, Ukraine
G	13	Andrew Adcock-Vidouria (W)	6 ft 2 in (1.88 m)	185 lb (84 kg)	Fr	St. Mary Central Catholic High School	San Antonio, TX
G	20	Jamar Livingston	6 ft 3 in (1.91 m)	190 lb (86 kg)	Sr	Walters State	Johnson City, TN
F	21	Elijah Summers-Livingston	6 ft 7 in (2.01 m)	215 lb (98 kg)	Fr	Arizona Compass Prep	Mesa, AZ
G	22	Jacob Spurlock	6 ft 4 in (1.93 m)	215 lb (98 kg)	Fr	Boyd County High School	Boyd County, KY
F	59	Japhet Moupadele	6 ft 8 in (2.03 m)	220 lb (100 kg)	So	San Jose State	Lille, France

Head coach

- Ethan Faulkner (Northern Kentucky)

Assistant coach(es)

- Dwaine Osborne (Clearwater Christian)
- Danny Reese (Wooster)
- Anthony Johnson (Clemson)
- Mark Richmond (West Virginia)

Legend

- (C) Team captain
- (S) Suspended
- (I) Ineligible
- (W) Walk-on
- (5Y) Fifth-year senior
- Injured
- Current redshirt

Roster
Last update: October 24, 2026

== Schedule and results ==
Date time, TV	Rank^{#}	Opponent^{#}	Result	Record	High points	High rebounds	High assists	Site (attendance) city, state
Exhibition
October 27, 2026*; 7:00 p.m.		at Akron	L 76–92	–	15 – Tied	9 – Amoako	4 – Aekins	James A. Rhodes Arena (806); Akron, OH
Regular season
November 2, 2026*; 7:00 p.m., ESPN+		at St. Bonaventure	W 79–71	1–0	26 – Holmstrom	10 – Amoako	7 – Aekins	Reilly Center (3,350); St. Bonaventure, NY
November 6, 2026*; 6:30 p.m., B1G+		at Ohio State	L 65–89	1–1	16 – Moupadele	6 – Nwankwo	5 – Aekins	Value City Arena (10,768); Columbus, OH
November 10, 2026*; 7:00 p.m., ESPN+		at Central Michigan	L 78–91	1–2	15 – 2 tied	5 – Nwankwo	7 – Aekins	McGuirk Arena (1,284); Mount Pleasant, MI
November 14, 2026*; 1:00 p.m., ESPN+		Marshall	W 74–71	2–2	17 – Amoako	11 – Amoako	3 – Tyler	Beeghly Center (1,463); Youngstown, OH
November 18, 2026*; 7:30 p.m., ESPN+		at Cincinnati	L 54–91	2–3	13 – Haynes	6 – Haynes	3 – Tied	Fifth Third Arena (9,009); Cincinnati, OH
November 22, 2026*; 2:00 p.m., ESPN+		William & Mary	L 63–75	2–4	19 – Nwankwo	9 – Amoako	3 – 2 tied	Beeghly Center (1,339); Youngstown, OH
November 23, 2026*; 6:30 p.m., ESPN+		Maryland Eastern Shore						Beeghly Center; Youngstown, OH
November 27, 2026*; 1:00 p.m., ESPN+		Bryant & Stratton						Beeghly Center; Youngstown, OH
December 2, 2026; 7:00 p.m., ESPN+		at Cleveland State						Wolstein Center; Cleveland, OH
December 5, 2026; 1:00 p.m., ESPN+		at Robert Morris						UPMC Events Center; Moon Township, PA
December 12, 2026*; 4:00 p.m., SECN+		at South Carolina						Colonial Life Arena; Columbia, SC
December 15, 2026*; 7:00 p.m., SECN+		at Ole Miss						SJB Pavilion; Oxford, MS
December 18, 2026*; 11:00 a.m., ESPN+		Penn State Shenango						Beeghly Center; Youngstown, OH
December 20, 2026*; 2:00 p.m., ESPN+		Bethany						Beeghly Center; Youngstown, OH
December 30, 2026; 4:00 p.m., ESPN+		Northern Illinois						Beeghly Center; Youngstown, OH
January 3, 2027; 2:00 p.m.		at IU Indy						James T. Morris Arena; Indianapolis, IN
January 6, 2027; 6:30 p.m., ESPN+		Oakland						Beeghly Center; Youngstown, OH
January 9, 2027; 2:00 p.m., ESPN+		Detroit Mercy						Beeghly Center; Youngstown, OH
January 14, 2027; 7:30 p.m.		at Green Bay						Resch Center; Ashwaubenon, WI
January 17, 2027; 3:00 p.m.		at Milwaukee						UW–Milwaukee Panther Arena; Milwaukee, WI
January 20, 2027; 6:30 p.m., ESPN+		IU Indy						Beeghly Center; Youngstown, OH
January 23, 2027; 4:30 p.m., ESPN+		Purdue Fort Wayne						Beeghly Center; Youngstown, OH
January 27, 2027; 7:00 p.m.		at Detroit Mercy						Calihan Hall; Detroit, MI
January 30, 2027; 3:00 p.m.		at Oakland						OU Credit Union O'rena; Rochester, MI
February 4, 2027; 7:00 p.m., ESPN+		at Northern Kentucky						Truist Arena; Highland Heights, KY
February 7, 2027; 2:00 p.m., ESPN+		Robert Morris						Beeghly Center; Youngstown, OH
February 10, 2027; 7:00 p.m., ESPN+		at Northern Illinois						NIU Convocation Center; DeKalb, IL
February 13, 2027; 4:00 p.m., ESPN+		Cleveland State						Beeghly Center; Youngstown, OH
February 17, 2027; 6:30 p.m., ESPN+		Wright State						Beeghly Center; Youngstown, OH
February 21, 2027; 2:00 p.m.		at Purdue Fort Wayne						Memorial Coliseum; Fort Wayne, IN
February 24, 2027; 6:30 p.m., ESPN+		Green Bay						Beeghly Center; Youngstown, OH
February 27, 2027; 2:00 p.m., ESPN+		Milwaukee						Beeghly Center; Youngstown, OH
*Non-conference game. ^{#}Rankings from AP poll. (#) Tournament seedings in parentheses. All times are in Eastern.
