= Bart Lundy =

American basketball coach (born 1971)

Current position
- Title: Head coach
- Team: Milwaukee
- Conference: Horizon League
- Record: 77–62 (.554)

Biographical details
- Born: November 5, 1971 (age 55)

Playing career
- ?: UNC Pembroke
- ?: Lenoir–Rhyne

Coaching career (HC unless noted)
- 1993–1995: Winthrop (assistant)
- 1995–1998: Queens (NC) (assistant)
- 1998–2003: Queens (NC)
- 2003–2009: High Point
- 2012–2013: North Texas (assistant)
- 2013–2022: Queens (NC)
- 2022–present: Milwaukee

Administrative career (AD unless noted)
- 2009–2012: Marquette (DBO)

Head coaching record
- Overall: 510–251 (.670)
- Tournaments: 19–9 (NCAA DII); 1–1 (CBI)

Accomplishments and honors

Awards
- 2004 National Rookie Coach of the Year

Bart Lundy (born November 5, 1971) is an American men's college basketball coach, who currently holds the head coach position for the Milwaukee Panthers men's basketball team. He was head coach at Queens University of Charlotte from 2013–2022, and previously an assistant coach at the University of North Texas from 2012–2013. Before going to North Texas, Lundy was the Director of Basketball Operations at Marquette University from 2009–2012. He is a native of Galax, Virginia.

During his college years he played at the University of North Carolina at Pembroke before transferring to Lenoir–Rhyne University. Before moving to Marquette, he was the head coach of the men's basketball team at High Point University from 2003–2009. Lundy had the head coaching job was at Queens University of Charlotte from 1998–2003 and his teams went to the NCAA Div. II Tournament three times in six seasons. He was named the Conference Carolinas Coach of the Year in 2000–01. Lundy is the first coach in the history of the Milwaukee Panthers program to win 20 games in his first two seasons as head coach, a record he would extend with another 20-win season in his third season in Milwaukee.

== Head coaching record ==
Record table
Season	Team	Overall	Conference	Standing	Postseason
Queens Royals (Conference Carolinas) (1998–2003)
1998–99	Queens (NC)	25–9	14–4	T–1st	NCAA Division II Round of 32
1999–00	Queens (NC)	16–12	11–7	T–3rd	
2000–01	Queens (NC)	26–6	19–3	1st	NCAA Division II Elite Eight
2001–02	Queens (NC)	19–10	15–5	3rd	
2002–03	Queens (NC)	29–4	18–2	1st	NCAA Division II Final Four
Queens (NC):		115–41 (.737)	77–21 (.786)		
High Point Panthers (Big South Conference) (2003–2009)
2003–04	High Point	19–11	10–6	T–3rd	
2004–05	High Point	13–18	7–9	T–4th	
2005–06	High Point	16–13	8–8	5th	
2006–07	High Point	22–10	11–3	2nd	
2007–08	High Point	17–14	8–6	3rd	
2008–09	High Point	9–21	4–14	T–9th	
High Point:		96–87 (.525)	48–46 (.511)		
Queens Royals (South Atlantic Conference) (2013–2022)
2013–14	Queens (NC)	14–13	12–10	6th	
2014–15	Queens (NC)	17–13	13–9	T–2nd	
2015–16	Queens (NC)	25–7	17–5	2nd	NCAA Division II Round of 32
2016–17	Queens (NC)	30–4	19–3	1st	NCAA Division II Sweet Sixteen
2017–18	Queens (NC)	32–4	18–2	2nd	NCAA Division II Final Four
2018–19	Queens (NC)	31–5	19–1	1st	NCAA Division II Elite Eight
2019–20	Queens (NC)	27–5	17–5	2nd	NCAA Division II Canceled
2020–21	Queens (NC)	16–6	13–3	2nd	NCAA Division II First Round
2021–22	Queens (NC)	30–4	21–3	1st	NCAA Division II Sweet Sixteen
Queens (NC):		222–61 (.784)	149–41 (.784)		
Milwaukee Panthers (Horizon League) (2022–present)
2022–23	Milwaukee	22–12	14–6	2nd	CBI Quarterfinals
2023-24	Milwaukee	20–15	12–8	6th	
2024-25	Milwaukee	21–11	14–6	T–2nd	
2025–26	Milwaukee	12–20	8–12	T–8th	
2026–27	Milwaukee	2–3	0–0		
Milwaukee:		77–62 (.554)	48–32 (.600)		
Total:		510–251 (.670)			
National champion Postseason invitational champion Conference regular season champion Conference regular season and conference tournament champion Division regular season champion Division regular season and conference tournament champion Conference tournament champion
