= Patrick Crarey II =

American basketball coach (born 1983)

Current position
- Title: Head coach
- Team: Grambling State
- Conference: SWAC
- Record: 15–19 (.441)

Biographical details
- Born: October 8, 1983 (age 43)
- Education: La Sierra ('07)

Coaching career (HC unless noted)
- 2005–2008: La Sierra (assistant/RC)
- 2009–2010: Takoma Academy
- 2010–2021: Washington Adventist
- 2021–2024: St. Thomas (FL)
- 2024–2025: Florida A&M
- 2025–present: Grambling State

Administrative career (AD unless noted)
- 2010–2021: Washington Adventist
- 2021–2024: St. Thomas (FL) (AAD)

Head coaching record
- Overall: 29–36 (.446) (NCAA); 219–145 (.602) (NAIA)

Patrick E. Crarey II (born October 8, 1983) is an American basketball coach who is the current head coach of the Grambling State Tigers men's basketball team. He previously coached for the La Sierra Golden Eagles, at Takoma Academy, for the Washington Adventist Shock, St. Thomas Bobcats and for Florida A&M

== Early life ==
Crarey grew up in Washington, D.C. He attended La Sierra University in Riverside, California, where he received a bachelor of science in exercise science, scientific basis.

== Coaching career ==
Crarey began his coaching career at La Sierra, where he served as assistant basketball coach and recruiting coordinator from 2005 to 2008. He subsequently received his first head coaching job, becoming the head boys basketball coach at Takoma Academy in Maryland.

After serving the 2009–10 season at Takoma, Crarey was named the head coach and athletic director for the Washington Adventist Shock. He served 10 seasons at Washington Adventist (the 2020–21 season was canceled due to the COVID-19 pandemic) and compiled an overall record of 163–129. He became the all-time winningest coach for the school and led them to some of their most successful seasons, helping the team win their first-ever United States Collegiate Athletic Association (USCAA) national championship in 2014. He had four 20-plus win seasons and four NAIA Tournament appearances at Washington Adventist, being named the conference coach of the year twice and the Association of Independent Institutions (AII) athletic director of the year in 2020.

Crarey was named assistant athletic director and head basketball coach for the St. Thomas Bobcats in 2021. He served three seasons in the position and led them to an overall record of 61–27, with winning seasons each year and two appearances in the NAIA Tournament. In his last season, he was named the Sun Conference coach of the year after leading the Bobcats to a 22–9 record and the conference regular season title.

Crarey was named the head coach of the Florida A&M Rattlers on April 17, 2024.

== Head coaching record ==
=== NCAA DI ===
Record table
Season	Team	Overall	Conference	Standing	Postseason
Florida A&M Rattlers (Southwestern Athletic Conference) (2024–2025)
2024–25	Florida A&M	14–17	10–8	7th	
Florida A&M:		14–17 (.452)	10–8 (.556)		
Grambling State Tigers (Southwestern Athletic Conference) (2025–present)
2025–26	Grambling State	14–19	7–11	T–9th	
2026–27	Grambling State	1–0	0–0		
Grambling State:		15–19 (.441)	7–11 (.389)		
Total:		29–36 (.446)			
National champion Postseason invitational champion Conference regular season champion Conference regular season and conference tournament champion Division regular season champion Division regular season and conference tournament champion Conference tournament champion

=== NAIA ===
Record table
Season	Team	Overall	Conference	Standing	Postseason
Washington Adventist Shock (Independent) (2010–2013)
2010–11	Washington Adventist	0–1			
2011–12	Washington Adventist	14–14			
2012–13	Washington Adventist	9–19			
Washington Adventist Shock (CAC) (2013–2021)
2013–14	Washington Adventist	22–8	10–3		USCAA national champion
2014–15	Washington Adventist	13–8	2–1		
2015–16	Washington Adventist	16–4	3–0		NAIA Division II First Round
2016–17	Washington Adventist	22–7	3–0	1st	NAIA Division II First Round
2017–18	Washington Adventist	11–13	0–1		
2018–19	Washington Adventist	22–11	6–0		NAIA Division II First Round
2019–20	Washington Adventist	23–9	1–1		NAIA Division II First Round
Washington Adventist:		152–94 (.618)	25–6 (.806)		
St. Thomas Bobcats (Sun Conference) (2021–2024)
2021–22	St. Thomas (FL)	13–10	10–6		
2022–23	St. Thomas (FL)	26–8	11–5		NAIA Sweet Sixteen
2023–24	St. Thomas (FL)	22–9	10–4		NAIA Second Round
St. Thomas (FL):		61–27 (.693)	31–15 (.674)		
Total:		213–121 (.638)			
National champion Postseason invitational champion Conference regular season champion Conference regular season and conference tournament champion Division regular season champion Division regular season and conference tournament champion Conference tournament champion
