= Ethan Faulkner =

American basketball player and coach

Current position
- Title: Head coach
- Team: Youngstown State
- Conference: Horizon
- Record: 38–32 (.543)

Biographical details
- Born: June 11, 1990 (age 36); Sandy Hook, Kentucky, U.S.

Playing career
- 2009–2013: Northern Kentucky
- Position: Point guard

Coaching career (HC unless noted)
- 2014–2015: Northern Kentucky (assistant)
- 2015–2016: Mount Vernon Nazarene (assistant)
- 2016–2019: Cumberlands (KY) (assistant)
- 2019–2024: Youngstown State (assistant)
- 2024–present: Youngstown State

Head coaching record
- Overall: 38–32 (.543)

Ethan Faulkner (born June 11, 1990) is an American basketball coach and former player, who is currently the head coach of the Youngstown State Penguins men's basketball team. Faulkner played college basketball for the Northern Kentucky Norse. In 2024, he was named the head coach of the Youngstown State Penguins men's basketball team.

== High school career ==
Faulkner was a standout point guard at Elliott County High School in Sandy Hook, Kentucky, winning the 16th Region Tournament MVP three years in a row. He and his twin brother, Evan, had led the Lions to the Kentucky Boy's Sweet 16 tournament three years in a row. As a senior, he led the Lions to the state semi-finals, where they were defeated by eventual state champion Holmes Junior/Senior High School 67–57. He scored 19 points, with 7 assists and 6 rebounds in the game. He was named to the Kentucky Boy's Sweet 16 All-Tournament Team.

== College career ==
Faulkner committed to the Northern Kentucky Norse men's basketball team as a senior in 2008. In his first year at Northern Kentucky University, Faulkner was originally part of the starting lineup of the Norse, but was eventually moved to a reserve role. He averaged 4.0 points per game, as the team eventually lost in the third round of their conference tournament. Faulkner had 6 points and a single assist in their final game of the season.

He was again relegated to a bench role as a backup to senior Malcolm Eleby. Faulkner started only three times during his sophomore year, but played in 28 games. On February 2, 2011, he scored a career-high 12 points against Missouri S&T. He averaged the sixth-most minutes-per-game on the team (19.3), was third in assists (1.64). He averaged 4.1 assists, 2.4 rebounds, and 0.4 steals per game.

== Coaching career ==
Faulkner played college basketball at Northern Kentucky before beginning his coaching career. Following stints coaching at Northern Kentucky, Mount Vernon Nazarene, and the University of the Cumberlands, Faulkner joined the Youngstown State coaching staff in 2019 as an assistant coach.

On April 1, 2024, Faulkner was named the next head coach at Youngstown State, replacing Jerrod Calhoun.

== Head coaching record ==
Record table
Season	Team	Overall	Conference	Standing	Postseason
Youngstown State Penguins (Horizon League) (2024–present)
2024–25	Youngstown State	21–13	13–7	4th	
2025–26	Youngstown State	15–17	8–12	T–8th	
2026–27	Youngstown State	2–2	0–0		
Youngstown State:		38–32 (.543)	21–19 (.525)		
Total:		38–32 (.543)			
National champion Postseason invitational champion Conference regular season champion Conference regular season and conference tournament champion Division regular season champion Division regular season and conference tournament champion Conference tournament champion
