= 2025–26 Grambling State Tigers men's basketball team =

American college basketball season

2025–26 Grambling State Tigers men's basketball
- Conference: Southwestern Athletic Conference
- Record: 14–19 (7–11 SWAC)
- Head coach: Patrick Crarey (1st season)
- Associate head coach: Chris Dorsey
- Assistant coaches: Aaron Proctor; AJ Register; Desmin Wade
- Home arena: Fredrick C. Hobdy Assembly Center

2025–26 SWAC men's basketball standings
	Conf.				Overall
Team	W		L	PCT	W		L	PCT
Bethune–Cookman	14	–	4	.778	17	–	15	.531
Florida A&M	11	–	7	.611	15	–	16	.484
Southern	11	–	7	.611	17	–	17	.500
Texas Southern	10	–	8	.556	12	–	18	.400
Alabama A&M	10	–	8	.556	18	–	15	.545
Arkansas–Pine Bluff	10	–	8	.556	13	–	19	.406
Jackson State	10	–	8	.556	12	–	21	.364
Prairie View A&M †	9	–	9	.500	19	–	18	.514
Grambling State	7	–	11	.389	14	–	19	.424
Alabama State	7	–	11	.389	10	–	22	.313
Alcorn State	7	–	11	.389	9	–	23	.281
Mississippi Valley State	2	–	16	.111	3	–	30	.091
† 2026 SWAC tournament winner

The 2025–26 Grambling State Tigers men's basketball team represented Grambling State University during the 2025–26 NCAA Division I men's basketball season. The Tigers, led by first-year head coach Patrick Crarey, played their home games at the Fredrick C. Hobdy Assembly Center in Grambling, Louisiana as members of the Southwestern Athletic Conference.

== Previous season ==
The Tigers finished the 2024–25 season 12–22, 7–11 in SWAC play, to finish in eighth place. They defeated Alabama A&M, and upset top-seeded Southern, before falling to eventual tournament champions Alabama State in the semifinals of the SWAC tournament.

On April 3, 2025, it was announced that head coach Donte Jackson would be leaving the program, after eight years at the helm, in order to take the head coaching position at Alabama A&M. A week later, on April 10, the school announced that they would be hiring Florida A&M head coach Patrick Crarey as the team's next head coach.

== Preseason ==
On October 8, 2025, the SWAC released their preseason polls. Grambling State was picked to finish seventh in the conference.

=== Preseason rankings ===
SWAC Preseason Poll
Place	Team	Votes
1	Bethune–Cookman	232 (12)
2	Southern	214 (5)
3	Jackson State	208 (1)
4	Alabama State	183 (3)
5	Texas Southern	182
6	Alabama A&M	163
7	Grambling State	151
8	Florida A&M	115
9	Prairie View A&M	99
10	Alcorn State	74
11	Arkansas–Pine Bluff	70 (1)
12	Mississippi Valley State	25
(#) first-place votes

=== Preseason All-SWAC Teams ===
No players were named to the First or Second Preseason All-SWAC Teams.

== Roster ==
2025–26 Grambling State Tigers men's basketball team
Players
Coaches

Pos.	#	Name	Height	Weight	Year	Previous school	Hometown
G	0	Derrius Ward	6 ft 6 in (1.98 m)	205 lb (93 kg)	GS	Coppin State	Philadelphia, Pennsylvania
F	1	Roderick Coffee III	6 ft 4 in (1.93 m)	200 lb (91 kg)	Sr	Florida A&M	Painesville, Ohio
G	2	Nazar Mahmoud	6 ft 5 in (1.96 m)	195 lb (88 kg)	Jr	UTSA	Leander, Texas
F	3	Rickey Ballard	6 ft 7 in (2.01 m)	200 lb (91 kg)	Sr	West Georgia	Coral Springs, Florida
G	4	P.J. Edwards	6 ft 4 in (1.93 m)	205 lb (93 kg)	RS Sr	Bowling Green	Springfield, Illinois
F	5	Jimel Lane	6 ft 7 in (2.01 m)	190 lb (86 kg)	Sr	Barry	Miami, Florida
F	7	Saliou Seye	7 ft 0 in (2.13 m)	218 lb (99 kg)	Sr	Alabama A&M	Dakar, Senegal
F	10	Richard Amaefule	6 ft 9 in (2.06 m)	—	GS	Texas Wesleyan	London, England
G	11	Jamil Muttilib	6 ft 6 in (1.98 m)	189 lb (86 kg)	Sr	Appalachian State	Houston, Texas
F	15	Antonio Munoz	6 ft 6 in (1.98 m)	180 lb (82 kg)	Fr	Whitney Young High School	Chicago, Illinois
G	20	Chancellor Perkins	6 ft 2 in (1.88 m)	185 lb (84 kg)	Fr	Highland High School	Woodbridge, Virginia
G/F	21	Devyn Franklin	6 ft 8 in (2.03 m)	210 lb (95 kg)	Sr	Ouachita Baptist	Terrell, Texas
F	23	Mekhi Fitts	6 ft 7 in (2.01 m)	230 lb (104 kg)	Jr	Gadsden State Community College	Birmingham, Alabama
C	24	Randarius Jones	6 ft 7 in (2.01 m)	235 lb (107 kg)	GS	Troy	Monroe, Louisiana

Head coach

- Patrick Crarey (La Sierra)

Assistant coach(es)

- Chris Dorsey (Lyndon State)
- Aaron Proctor (Cal State San Bernardino)
- AJ Register (Alabama)
- Desmin Wade (Washington Adventist)

Legend

- (C) Team captain
- (S) Suspended
- (I) Ineligible
- (W) Walk-on
- Injured
- Current redshirt

Roster
Last update: December 16, 2025

== Schedule and results ==
Date time, TV	Rank^{#}	Opponent^{#}	Result	Record	High points	High rebounds	High assists	Site (attendance) city, state
Non-conference regular season
November 3, 2025*; 6:30 pm		Huston–Tillotson	W 91–47	1–0	15 – Lane	14 – Franklin	3 – Tied	Fredrick C. Hobdy Assembly Center (1,557); Grambling, LA
November 6, 2025*; 7:00 pm, ESPN+		at No. 16 Iowa State	L 62–102	1–1	16 – Munoz	5 – Lane	7 – Munoz	Hilton Coliseum (13,609); Ames, IA
November 9, 2025*; 5:00 pm, ESPN+		at Howard	W 73–70	2–1	21 – Muttilib	8 – Coffee III	8 – Coffee III	Burr Gymnasium (1,653); Washington, D.C.
November 13, 2025*; 6:30 pm		Southern Miss	W 75−70	3−1	20 – Coffee III	4 – Tied	8 – Coffee III	Fredrick C. Hobdy Assembly Center (1,578); Grambling, LA
November 18, 2025*; 8:00 pm, ESPN+		at San Diego; Acrisure Series campus-site game	L 68−78	3−2	21 – Munoz	7 – Muttilib	3 – Ward	Jenny Craig Pavilion (371); San Diego, CA
November 21, 2025*; 9:00 pm, ESPN+		at California Baptist; Acrisure Series campus-site game	L 59–72	3–3	18 – Ward	7 – Lane	1 – Tied	Fowler Events Center (2,617); Riverside, CA
November 24, 2025*; 2:00 pm, ESPN+		at UC Riverside; Acrisure Series campus-site game	L 74–83	3–4	20 – Ballard	8 – Muttilib	5 – Coffee III	SRC Arena (355); Riverside, CA
December 2, 2025*; 6:30 pm, ESPN+		at Tulane	L 63–65	3–5	18 – Ward	10 – Coffee III	6 – Coffee III	Devlin Fieldhouse (1,255); New Orleans, LA
December 8, 2025*; 7:00 pm, ESPN+		at Southern Miss	L 60–68	3–6	16 – Coffee III	8 – Jones	4 – Tied	Reed Green Coliseum (2,347); Hattiesburg, MS
December 18, 2025*; 6:30 pm, ESPNU		vs. Norfolk State; Chris Paul HBCU Classic	W 80–68	4–6	22 – Munoz	5 – Tied	5 – Tied	Gateway Center Arena (535); College Park, GA
December 19, 2025*; 4:00 pm, ESPNU		vs. Hampton; Chris Paul HBCU Classic	W 81–72	5–6	23 – Munoz	5 – Tied	6 – Coffee III	Gateway Center Arena (486); College Park, GA
December 23, 2025*; 1:00 pm, BTN		at Ohio State	L 63–89	5–7	19 – Munoz	4 – Tied	5 – Coffee III	Value City Arena (10,697); Columbus, OH
December 30, 2025*; 12:00 pm		Centenary (LA)	W 90–58	6–7	18 – Lane	11 – Franklin	4 – Perkins	Fredrick C. Hobdy Assembly Center (219); Grambling, LA
SWAC regular season
January 3, 2026; 4:00 pm		Prairie View A&M	W 76–72	7–7 (1–0)	15 – Munoz	8 – Coffee III	5 – Munoz	Fredrick C. Hobdy Assembly Center (1,002); Grambling, LA
January 5, 2026; 6:30 pm		Texas Southern	W 84–67	8–7 (2–0)	21 – Coffee III	7 – Coffee III	3 – Ward	Fredrick C. Hobdy Assembly Center (1,756); Grambling, LA
January 10, 2026; 4:30 pm		at Bethune–Cookman	L 65–74	8–8 (2–1)	14 – Ballard	8 – Franklin	4 – Coffee III	Moore Gymnasium (689); Daytona Beach, FL
January 12, 2026; 6:00 p.m.		at Florida A&M	L 84–91	8–9 (2–2)	22 – Muttilib	5 – Ward	5 – Ward	Al Lawson Center (901); Tallahassee, FL
January 17, 2026; 4:00 pm		Southern	L 53–71	8–10 (2–3)	11 – Ward	7 – Seye	1 – Tied	Fredrick C. Hobdy Assembly Center (4,787); Grambling, LA
January 31, 2026; 3:00 pm		at Jackson State	W 69–66	9–10 (3–3)	15 – Tied	10 – Franklin	8 – Coffee III	Williams Assembly Center (1,136); Jackson, MS
February 2, 2026; 7:00 p.m.		at Alcorn State	W 74–50	10–10 (4–3)	17 – Coffee III	10 – Munoz	5 – Tied	Davey Whitney Complex (862); Lorman, MS
February 4, 2026; 6:30 pm		Arkansas–Pine Bluff	L 64–67	10–11 (4–4)	26 – Munoz	7 – Munoz	3 – Tied	Fredrick C. Hobdy Assembly Center (1,737); Grambling, LA
February 7, 2026; 4:00 pm		Alabama State	W 57–47	11–11 (5–4)	24 – Coffee III	10 – Coffee III	3 – Ward	Fredrick C. Hobdy Assembly Center (1,075); Grambling, LA
February 9, 2026; 6:30 pm		Alabama A&M	L 58–66	11–12 (5–5)	17 – Coffee III	10 – Franklin	4 – Tied	Fredrick C. Hobdy Assembly Center (2,221); Grambling, LA
February 14, 2026; 4:00 p.m.		at Texas Southern	L 79–82	11–13 (5–6)	26 – Muttilib	11 – Lane	5 – Coffee III	H&PE Arena (1,477); Houston, TX
February 16, 2026; 6:00 pm		at Prairie View A&M	L 63–68	11–14 (5–7)	25 – Muttilib	10 – Muttilib	7 – Coffee III	William Nicks Building (1,135); Prairie View, TX
February 21, 2026; 5:00 pm		at Southern	L 73–87	11–15 (5–8)	19 – Munoz	10 – Lane	4 – Munoz	F. G. Clark Center (6,958); Baton Rouge, LA
February 23, 2026; 8:00 pm		Mississippi Valley State	W 83–62	12–15 (6–8)	21 – Munoz	10 – Lane	7 – Coffee III	Fredrick C. Hobdy Assembly Center (751); Grambling, LA
February 26, 2026; 4:00 pm		Bethune–Cookman	L 71–76	12–16 (6–9)	24 – Ward	11 – Franklin	6 – Coffee III	Fredrick C. Hobdy Assembly Center (1,015); Grambling, LA
February 28, 2026; 6:30 pm		Florida A&M	L 59–66	12–17 (6–10)	17 – Ward	6 – Coffee III	2 – Tied	Fredrick C. Hobdy Assembly Center (1,577); Grambling, LA
March 3, 2026; 7:30 pm		at Alabama A&M	L 63–77	12–18 (6–11)	16 – Muttlib	7 – Muttlib	7 – Coffee III	AAMU Event Center (3,098); Huntsville, AL
March 5, 2026; 7:00 pm		at Alabama State	W 65–63	13–18 (6–12)	27 – Muttlib	7 – Tied	5 – Ward	Dunn–Oliver Acadome (961); Montgomery, AL
SWAC tournament
March 9, 2026; 7:30 pm, ESPN+	(9)	vs. (12) Mississippi Valley State; First round	W 77–52	14–18	22 – Muttilib	6 – Tied	7 – Ward	Gateway Center Arena (807); College Park, GA
March 10, 2026; 7:30 pm, ESPN+	(9)	vs. (7) Jackson State; Second round	L 65–68	14–19	14 – Munoz	7 – Franklin	6 – Ward	Gateway Center Arena (1,024); College Park, GA
*Non-conference game. ^{#}Rankings from AP Poll. (#) Tournament seedings in parentheses. All times are in Central.
