= Youngstown State Penguins men's basketball =

Men's basketball team representing Youngstown State

| 2026–27 Youngstown State Penguins men's basketball team |
- University: Youngstown State University
- First season: 1927–28
- Athletic director: Ron Strollo
- Head coach: Ethan Faulkner; 3rd season, 36–30 (.545)
- Location: Youngstown, Ohio
- Arena: Beeghly Center (capacity: 4,633)
- NCAA division: Division I
- Conference: Horizon League
- Nickname: Penguins
- Colors: Red, white, and black
- All-time record: 1,230–1,265 (.493)

NCAA Division II tournament Sweet Sixteen
- 1972

NCAA Division II tournament appearances
- 1961, 1962, 1963, 1964, 1966, 1970, 1972, 1975, 1977

NIT appearances
- 2023
Other NIT results
| Appearances | 2023 |

NAIA quarterfinals
- 1957, 1958

Appearances
- 1947, 1957, 1958, 1959

Conference regular-season champions
- 2023

The Youngstown State Penguins men's basketball team represents Youngstown State University in Youngstown, Ohio. The team currently competes in National Collegiate Athletic Association (NCAA) at the Division I level as a member of the Horizon League, of which it has been a member since 2001. Since 1972, home games are played at the 4,633-seat Beeghly Center on the YSU campus. The Penguins have never appeared in the NCAA Division I men's basketball tournament.

== History ==
The team was founded in 1927 and played their first game on December 14, 1927, a 53–24 loss to Thiel College. Like many other men's athletic programs, after the 1942–43 season, the program was suspended, but returned in 1946 after World War II. Upon reinstatement in 1946, the Penguins joined the National Association of Intercollegiate Athletics (NAIA), where they competed from 1946 to 1960. As NAIA members, the Penguins qualified for the NAIA tournament four times and had an overall record of 5–4 in tournament play, advancing as far as the quarterfinals in 1957 and 1958.

YSU joined the NCAA in 1960 and competed at the Division II level from 1960 to 1981, joining the Mid-Continent Conference in 1978. During their tenure in Division II, the Penguins qualified for the NCAA tournament nine times and had an overall record of 8–11 in tournament play, advancing as far as the regional finals in 1972. YSU moved to Division I in 1981 and joined the Ohio Valley Conference. They reached the tournament final in 1984 and 1985, losing both times. They played in the OVC until 1988. The Penguins competed as an independent from 1988 to 1992, then rejoined the Mid-Continent Conference, which by then had become a Division I conference. They reached the tournament final in 1998. They joined the Horizon League in 2001.

YSU made their first appearance and recorded their first win in a Division I postseason tournament by playing in the 2013 CollegeInsider.com Postseason Tournament where they went 1–1. The 2022–23 season saw the program win their first-ever conference championship by winning the Horizon League regular-season title, along with their first appearance in the National Invitation Tournament (NIT). In 2025, they reached the final of the Horizon League tournament for the first time ever.

== Postseason results ==
=== NCAA Division II tournament results ===
The Penguins have appeared in the NCAA Division II Tournament nine times. Their combined record is 8–11.

| Year | Round | Opponent | Result |
|---|---|---|---|
| 1961 | Regional semifinals Regional 3rd-place game | Wittenberg; South Carolina State | L 28–43; W 96–82 |
| 1962 | Regional semifinals Regional 3rd-place game | Florida A&M; Gannon | L 60–74; W 58–52 |
| 1963 | Regional semifinals Regional 3rd-place game | Wittenberg; Buffalo | L 31–38; W 65–53 |
| 1964 | Regional semifinals Regional 3rd-place game | Le Moyne; Ithaca | L 53–64; W 91–79 |
| 1966 | Regional semifinals Regional 3rd-place game | Akron; Randolph–Macon | L 63–70; W 94–63 |
| 1970 | Regional semifinals Regional 3rd-place game | Philadelphia; Cheyney | L 52–79; L 91–94 |
| 1972 | Regional Quarterfinals; Regional semifinals Regional Finals | Gannon; Cheyney; Akron | W 81–71; W 90–80; L 71–87 |
| 1975 | Regional semifinals Regional 3rd-place game | Saint Joseph's; Eastern Illinois | L 78–96; L 80–86 |
| 1977 | Regional semifinals Regional 3rd-place game | Randolph–Macon; Bellarmine | L 69–71 ^{OT} W 81–79 |

=== NIT results ===
The Penguins have appeared in the National Invitation Tournament one time. Their combined record is 0–1.

| Year | Round | Opponent | Result |
|---|---|---|---|
| 2023 | First Round | Oklahoma State | L 64–69 |

=== NAIA tournament results ===
The Penguins have appeared in the NAIA Tournament four times. Their combined record is 5–4.

| Year | Round | Opponent | Result |
|---|---|---|---|
| 1947 | First round | Northern Arizona | L 45–49 ^{OT} |
| 1957 | First round Second Round; Quarterfinals | Westmont; Emporia State; Southeastern Oklahoma State | W 81–75; W 80–74; L 65–69 |
| 1958 | First round Second Round; Quarterfinals | Quincy; Platteville State; Western Illinois | W 88–68; W 74–63; L 67–70 |
| 1959 | First round Second Round | Northern State; Tennessee State | W 85–76; L 80–89 |

=== CIT results ===
The Penguins have appeared in one CollegeInsider.com Postseason Tournament (CIT). It was their first Division I postseason tournament appearance in program history. Their record is 1–1. They accepted an invitation to the 2020 CIT, however the tournament was canceled.

| Year | Round | Opponent | Result |
|---|---|---|---|
| 2013 | First round Second Round | Oakland; Canisius | W 99–87; L 82–84 ^{OT} |

=== The Basketball Classic results ===
The Penguins have appeared in one of The Basketball Classic Tournaments. It was their third Division I postseason tournament appearance in program history. Their record is 1–1.

| Year | Round | Opponent | Result |
|---|---|---|---|
| 2022 | First round Quarterfinals | Morgan State; Fresno State | W 70-65; L 71–80 |

== Year by year results ==
Record table
| Season | Coach | Overall | Conference | Standing | Postseason |
|---|---|---|---|---|---|
Al Fairfield () (1927–1930)
| 1927–28 | Al Fairfield | 2–2 | | | |
| 1928–29 | Al Fairfield | 8–2 | | | |
| 1929–30 | Al Fairfield | 6–6 | | | |
| Al Fairfield: | | 16–10 (.615) | | | |
Jack McPhee () (1930–1932)
| 1930–31 | Jack McPhee | 1–13 | | | |
| 1931–32 | Jack McPhee | 3–10 | | | |
| Jack McPhee: | | 4–23 (.148) | | | |
Denton Doll () (1932–1933)
| 1932–33 | Denton Doll | 3–11 | | | |
| Denton Doll: | | 3–11 (.214) | | | |
Jack McPhee () (1933–1935)
| 1933–34 | Jack McPhee | 6–8 | | | |
| 1934–35 | Jack McPhee | 11–9 | | | |
| Jack McPhee: | | 21–40 (.344) | | | |
Ray Sweeney () (1935–1940)
| 1935–36 | Ray Sweeney | 8–11 | | | |
| 1936–37 | Ray Sweeney | 8–10 | | | |
| 1937–38 | Ray Sweeney | 11–9 | | | |
| 1938–39 | Ray Sweeney | 6–12 | | | |
| 1939–40 | Ray Sweeney | 9–9 | | | |
| Ray Sweeney: | | 42–51 (.452) | | | |
Dom Rosselli () (1940–1942)
| 1940–41 | Dom Rosselli | 14–8 | | | |
| 1941–42 | Dom Rosselli | 9–12 | | | |
| Dom Rosselli: | | 23–20 (.535) | | | |
Joe Morbito (NAIA) (1942–1943)
| 1942–43 | Joe Morbito | 11–5 | | | |
| Joe Morbito: | | 11–5 (.688) | | | |
Dom Rosselli (NAIA) (1946–1960)
| 1946–47 | Dom Rosselli | 13–10 | | | NAIA National Tournament, 1st Round |
| 1947–48 | Dom Rosselli | 10–14 | | | |
| 1948–49 | Dom Rosselli | 9–14 | | | |
| 1949–50 | Dom Rosselli | 3–20 | | | |
| 1950–51 | Dom Rosselli | 16–7 | | | |
| 1951–52 | Dom Rosselli | 16–7 | | | |
| 1952–53 | Dom Rosselli | 10–14 | | | |
| 1953–54 | Dom Rosselli | 11–16 | | | |
| 1954–55 | Dom Rosselli | 10–17 | | | |
| 1955–56 | Dom Rosselli | 12–14 | | | |
| 1956–57 | Dom Rosselli | 23–4 | | | NAIA National Tournament, quarterfinals |
| 1957–58 | Dom Rosselli | 23–7 | | | NAIA National Tournament, quarterfinals |
| 1958–59 | Dom Rosselli | 19–9 | | | NAIA National Tournament, 2nd Round |
| 1959–60 | Dom Rosselli | 11–14 | | | |
Dom Rosselli (NCAA Division II Independent) (1960–1978)
| 1960–61 | Dom Rosselli | 21–7 | | | |
| 1961–62 | Dom Rosselli | 16–12 | | | |
| 1962–63 | Dom Rosselli | 18–9 | | | |
| 1963–64 | Dom Rosselli | 24–3 | | | |
| 1964–65 | Dom Rosselli | 20–6 | | | |
| 1965–66 | Dom Rosselli | 19–7 | | | |
| 1966–67 | Dom Rosselli | 18–7 | | | |
| 1967–68 | Dom Rosselli | 17–8 | | | |
| 1968–69 | Dom Rosselli | 19–7 | | | |
| 1969–70 | Dom Rosselli | 22–5 | | | |
| 1970–71 | Dom Rosselli | 19–6 | | | |
| 1971–72 | Dom Rosselli | 22–7 | | | |
| 1972–73 | Dom Rosselli | 10–13 | | | |
| 1973–74 | Dom Rosselli | 10–16 | | | |
| 1974–75 | Dom Rosselli | 19–9 | | | |
| 1975–76 | Dom Rosselli | 17–9 | | | |
| 1976–77 | Dom Rosselli | 22–7 | | | |
| 1977–78 | Dom Rosselli | 16–9 | | | |
Dom Rosselli (Mid-Continent Athletic Association) (1978–1981)
| 1978–79 | Dom Rosselli | 13–13 | 4–6 | | |
| 1979–80 | Dom Rosselli | 17–10 | 2–6 | | |
| 1980–81 | Dom Rosselli | 13–13 | 3–3 | | |
Dom Rosselli (Ohio Valley Conference) (1981–1982)
| 1981–82 | Dom Rosselli | 8–18 | 5–11 | 6th | |
| Dom Rosselli: | | 589–388 (.603) | 14–26 (.350) | | |
Mike Rice (Ohio Valley Conference) (1982–1987)
| 1982–83 | Mike Rice | 15–12 | 5–9 | 6th | |
| 1983–84 | Mike Rice | 18–11 | 9–5 | 3rd | |
| 1984–85 | Mike Rice | 19–11 | 9–5 | 2nd (tie) | |
| 1985–86 | Mike Rice | 12–16 | 8–6 | 3rd (tie) | |
| 1986–87 | Mike Rice | 11–17 | 4–10 | 7th | |
| Mike Rice: | | 75–67 (.528) | 34–36 (.486) | | |
Jim Cleamons (Ohio Valley Conference) (1987–1989)
| 1987–88 | Jim Cleamons | 7–21 | 2–12 | 7th | |
Jim Cleamons (Independent) (1988–1989)
| 1988–89 | Jim Cleamons | 5–23 | | | |
| Jim Cleamons: | | 12–44 (.214) | 2–12 (.143) | | |
John Stroia (Independent) (1989–1992)
| 1989–90 | John Stroia | 8–20 | | | |
| 1990–91 | John Stroia | 12–16 | | | |
| 1991–92 | John Stroia | 6–22 | | | |
John Stroia (Mid-Continent Conference) (1992–1993)
| 1992–93 | John Stroia | 3–23 | 2–14 | 9th | |
| John Stroia: | | 29–81 (.264) | 2–14 (.125) | | |
Dan Peters (Mid-Continent Conference) (1993–1999)
| 1993–94 | Dan Peters | 5–21 | 3–15 | 10th | |
| 1994–95 | Dan Peters | 18–10 | 10–8 | 4th (tie) | |
| 1995–96 | Dan Peters | 12–15 | 7–11 | 9th | |
| 1996–97 | Dan Peters | 9–18 | 4–12 | 7th (tie) | |
| 1997–98 | Dan Peters | 20–9 | 11–5 | 3rd (tie) | |
| 1998–99 | Dan Peters | 14–14 | 9–5 | 3rd (tie) | |
| Dan Peters: | | 78–87 (.473) | 44–56 (.440) | | |
John Robic (Mid-Continent Conference) (1999–2001)
| 1999–00 | John Robic | 12–16 | 9–7 | 5th | |
| 2000–01 | John Robic | 19–11 | 11–5 | 3rd | |
John Robic (Horizon League) (2001–2005)
| 2001–02 | John Robic | 5–23 | 2–14 | 9th | |
| 2002–03 | John Robic | 9–20 | 4–12 | 6th (tie) | |
| 2003–04 | John Robic | 8–20 | 4–12 | 7th (tie) | |
| 2004–05 | John Robic | 5–23 | 2–14 | 9th | |
| John Robic: | | 58–113 (.339) | 32–54 (.372) | | |
Jerry Slocum (Horizon League) (2005–2017)
| 2005–06 | Jerry Slocum | 7–21 | 4–12 | 9th | |
| 2006–07 | Jerry Slocum | 14–17 | 7–9 | 4th (tie) | |
| 2007–08 | Jerry Slocum | 9–21 | 5–13 | 9th | |
| 2008–09 | Jerry Slocum | 11–19 | 7–11 | 6th (tie) | |
| 2009–10 | Jerry Slocum | 8–22 | 2–16 | 10th | |
| 2010–11 | Jerry Slocum | 9–21 | 2–16 | 9th (tie) | |
| 2011–12 | Jerry Slocum | 16–15 | 10–8 | 6th (tie) | |
| 2012–13 | Jerry Slocum | 18–16 | 7–9 | 5th (tie) | CIT 2nd Round |
| 2013–14 | Jerry Slocum | 15–17 | 6–10 | 7th (tie) | |
| 2014–15 | Jerry Slocum | 11–21 | 2–14 | 9th | |
| 2015–16 | Jerry Slocum | 11–21 | 6–12 | 7th | |
| 2016–17 | Jerry Slocum | 13–21 | 5–13 | 8th (tie) | |
| Jerry Slocum: | | 142–232 (.380) | 61–143 (.299) | | |
Jerrod Calhoun (Horizon League) (2017–2024)
| 2017–18 | Jerrod Calhoun | 8–24 | 6–12 | | |
| 2018–19 | Jerrod Calhoun | 12–20 | 8–10 | 6th (tie) | |
| 2019–20 | Jerrod Calhoun | 18–15 | 10–8 | 4th (tie) | |
| 2020–21 | Jerrod Calhoun | 15–12 | 9–11 | 6th | |
| 2021–22 | Jerrod Calhoun | 19–15 | 12–9 | 7th | TBC Second Round |
| 2022–23 | Jerrod Calhoun | 24–10 | 15–5 | 1st | NIT First Round |
| 2023–24 | Jerrod Calhoun | 22–10 | 14–6 | 2nd | |
| Jerrod Calhoun: | | 118–106 (.527) | 74–61 (.548) | | |
Ethan Faulkner (Horizon League) (2024–present)
| 2024–25 | Ethan Faulkner | 21–13 | 13–7 | 4th | |
| 2025–26 | Ethan Faulkner | 15–17 | 8–12 | 8th (tie) | |
| Jerrod Calhoun: | | 36–30 (.545) | 21–19 (.525) | | |
| Total: | | 1,230–1,265 (.493) | | | |
National champion Postseason invitational champion Conference regular season champion Conference regular season and conference tournament champion Division regular season champion Division regular season and conference tournament champion Conference tournament champion
