= Matt Majkrzak =

American college basketball coach (born 1990)

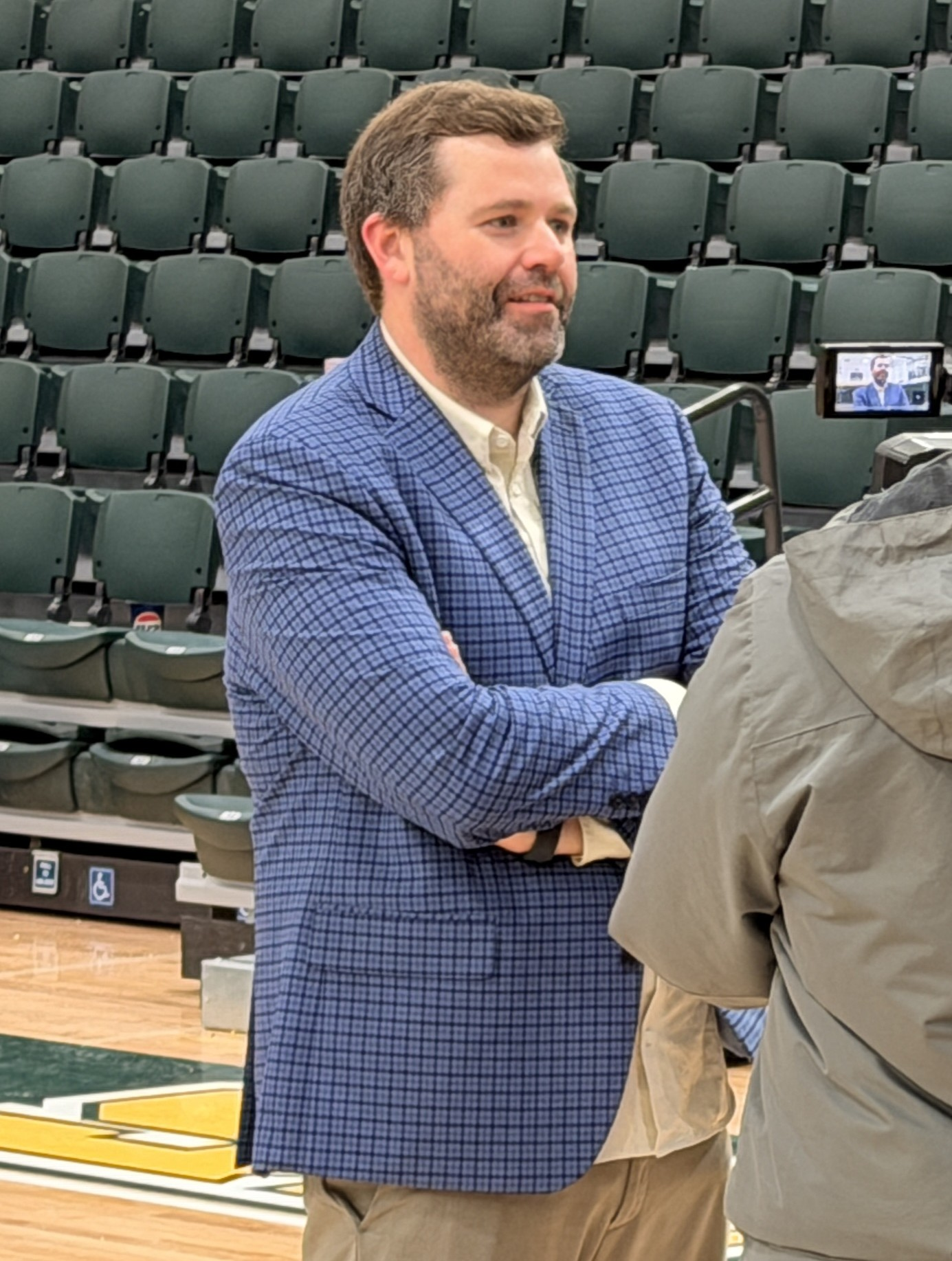
- Majkrzak in 2026

Current position
- Title: Head coach
- Team: Northern Illinois
- Conference: Horizon League
- Record: 0–1 (.000)
- Annual salary: $330,000

Biographical details
- Born: January 31, 1990 (age 36)
- Education: University of Wisconsin–Green Bay

Playing career

Basketball
- 2006–q2008: Elkhart Lake-Glenbeulah High School (Elkhart Lake, WI)
- Position: Forward

Coaching career (HC unless noted)
- 2008–2012: Green Bay (SA)
- 2012–2014: Chadron State (GA)
- 2014–2018: Bemidji State (assistant)
- 2018–2019: Bryant & Stratton
- 2019–2026: Northern Michigan
- 2026–present: Northern Illinois

Head coaching record
- Overall: 161–82 (.663)
- Tournaments: 2–2 (NCAA Division II); 2–1 (NJCAA Division I)

Accomplishments and honors

Championships
- GLIAC Regular Season Champions (2023-24, 2025-26); GLIAC Tournament Champions (2022-23, 2024-25)

Awards
- GLIAC Coach of the year (2023-24, 2025-26)

Matt Majkrzak (born January 31, 1990) is an American college basketball coach. He is currently the head coach of the Northern Illinois Huskies men's basketball team. He previously coached for the Green Bay Phoenix, Chadron State Eagles, Bemidji State Beavers, Bryant & Stratton Bobcats and Northern Michigan Wildcats.

== Biography ==
Majkrzak is from Elkhart Lake, Wisconsin. He attended Elkhart Lake-Glenbeulah High School where he played basketball and golf. He then attended the University of Wisconsin–Green Bay, where he received a Bachelor of Arts in business management. Majkrzak later earned a master's degree in organizational management from Chadron State College in Nebraska.

While attending Green Bay, Majkrzak worked as a student assistant for the Green Bay Phoenix men's basketball team. He served four years in that role. While at Green Bay, Majkrzak also established an Amateur Athletic Union (AAU) basketball team known as the Wisconsin Jets and coached them for several seasons. In 2012, he became a graduate assistant with the Chadron State Eagles, serving two years in that role. He joined the Bemidji State Beavers in 2014 as an assistant coach and was promoted to top assistant in 2016. In 2018, Majkrzak was hired by Bryant & Stratton College as head basketball coach.

Majkrzak was hired as head coach of the NCAA Division II-level Northern Michigan Wildcats in 2019. He posted his first winning record in his third season there, with a record of 18–12, and then had 22 or more wins in each of the next four seasons, with NCAA Division II Tournament appearances each year and a best mark of 28–7 in 2025–26. He helped Northern Michigan win the Great Lakes Intercollegiate Athletic Conference (GLIAC) tournament in 2023 and 2025, while winning the league's regular season title in 2024 and 2026. Majkrzak was selected the conference coach of the year in 2024 and 2026. In seven seasons at Northern Michigan, Majkrzak led the team to a record of 136–73.

In March 2026, Majkrzak was named head coach of the Northern Illinois Huskies for a yearly salary of $330,000.

== Head coaching record ==
Record table
Season	Team	Overall	Conference	Standing	Postseason
Bryant & Stratton College - Wisconsin (NJCAA) (2018–2019)
2018–19	Bryant & Stratton	25–8			NJCAA Region IV Finalists
Bryant & Stratton:		25–8 (.758)			
Northern Michigan Wildcats (GLIAC) (2018–2026)
2019–20	Northern Michigan	13-17	9-11	T-3rd (North Div.)	
2020–21	Northern Michigan	8-8	8-8	T–5th	
2021–22	Northern Michigan	18-12	12-8	T–2nd	
2022–23	Northern Michigan	25-8	13-5	T-2nd	NCAA Division II Round of 32
2023–24	Northern Michigan	22-11	14-4	1st	NCAA Division II Round of 64
2024–25	Northern Michigan	22-10	13-7	4th	NCAA Division II Round of 64
2025–26	Northern Michigan	28-7	16-4	1st	NCAA Division II Round of 32
Northern Michigan:		136–78 (.636)	85–47 (.644)		
Northern Illinois Huskies (Horizon League) (2026–present)
2026–27	Northern Illinois	0–1	0–0		
Northern Illinois:		0–1 (.000)	0–0 (–)		
Total:		161–82 (.663)			
National champion Postseason invitational champion Conference regular season champion Conference regular season and conference tournament champion Division regular season champion Division regular season and conference tournament champion Conference tournament champion

Current through November 2, 2026

== Marriage and family ==
Matt Majkrzak has been married to his wife, Lindsey LeMay Majkrzak (coach for NMU Women's Lacrosse), since 2022. They met each other while Lindsey's first year coaching at Northern Michigan University (2020). They both have a dog.
