= 2025–26 NCAA Division I men's basketball season =

American college basketball season

- Preseason AP No. 1: Purdue Boilermakers
- Regular season: November 3, 2025 − March 15, 2026
- NCAA Tournament: 2026
- Tournament dates: March 17, 2026 – April 6, 2026
- National Championship: Lucas Oil Stadium; Indianapolis, Indiana
- NCAA Champions: Michigan Wolverines
- Other champions: Auburn Tigers (NIT); West Virginia Mountaineers (CBC)
- Player of the Year (Naismith, Wooden): Cameron Boozer, Duke Blue Devils

The 2025–26 NCAA Division I men's basketball season began on November 3, 2025. The regular season ended on March 15, 2026, with the 2026 NCAA Division I men's basketball tournament beginning with the First Four on March 17 and ending with the championship game at Lucas Oil Stadium in Indianapolis, Indiana, on April 6.

== Rule changes ==
On May 9, 2025, the NCAA Basketball Rules Committee proposed a few rule changes for the 2025–26 and 2026–27 seasons. These changes were approved on June 10 by the NCAA Men's Basketball Rules Committee and the Playing Rules Oversight Panel.

- If one of the shot clocks becomes inoperable, the shot clock at the other basket will remain on.
- Headbands up to 4 inches wide will be allowed.
- Continuous motion rule: an offensive player who ends his dribble going toward the basket and absorbs contact from the defense will be permitted to pivot or complete the step the player is on and finish the field goal attempt.
- Officials will have the option to call a flagrant 1 foul when a player is contacted to the groin.
- Bench personnel who physically assist a player with the ball will be penalized if they intentionally interfere (i.e., assisting a player to stay inbounds when their momentum is taking them out of bounds, pushing a player in a direction the coach wants the player to go).
- All fouls or violations below the free throw line extended in a team's frontcourt will result in throw-ins at the nearest-designated spot under the basket and all fouls or violations above the free throw line extended will result in throw-ins at the nearest-designated spot at the 28’ foot mark.
- If a player uses the backboard or rim to gain an advantage, it will be a basket interference violation.
- Musical instruments, amplified music, canned music or artificial noisemakers will be permitted during dead balls.
- A one-game suspension will be required for an individual who failed to serve a suspension for physical abuse of an official or fighting, and a one-game suspension for the team's head coach will be required when the individual who should have served their suspension failed to do so.
- A coach's challenge will be permitted at any point in a game to review out-of-bounds calls, basket interference/goaltending and whether a secondary defender was in the restricted area arc.

On December 18, 2024, a United States District Court issued a preliminary injunction in favor of Vanderbilt quarterback Diego Pavia after preliminarily finding that NCAA Division I by-laws 12.02.06 and 14.3.3 and the rules in the NCAA Division I 2024–25 Manual constitute a commercial agreement, can be replaced by a less restrictive alternative and cause irreparable harm to Pavia. The injunction prevents the NCAA from enforcing its eligibility rules against Pavia and Vanderbilt University. The injunction is not a final determination of the judicial system as to the NCAA's eligibility rules and specifically applies only to Pavia. Nevertheless, the NCAA Division I board of directors approved a temporary blanket waiver for student-athletes who competed at a non-NCAA school for one or more years and would have exhausted their NCAA eligibility following the 2024–25 academic year under existing rules. Such student-athletes are granted an additional year of eligibility for the 2025–26 academic year.

== Season headlines ==
- May 6 – New Haven announced that it accepted an invitation to join the NEC effective July 1, 2025, and begin reclassification from NCAA Division II to be eligible for NCAA-sponsored postseason play in 2028–29.
- June 4 – Utah Valley announced that it would join the Big West Conference from the Western Athletic Conference (WAC) in 2026–27.
- June 18 – Sacramento State announced it would join the Big West Conference from Big Sky Conference in 2026–27.
- June 25 – Southern Utah and Utah Tech announced they would join the Big Sky Conference from the WAC in 2026–27.
- June 26 – The Atlantic Sun Conference (ASUN) and the Western Athletic Conference (WAC) announced a strategic alliance under which the WAC will rebrand as the United Athletic Conference (UAC) beginning with the 2026–27 academic year. The rebranding will allow the continuing conference to retain the WAC’s automatic qualification status for NCAA championship events, including basketball. Under the announced alignment:
  - The rebranded all-sports UAC will include the three remaining WAC institutions—Abilene Christian and Tarleton State, and non-football UT Arlington.
  - The five ASUN members that play football in the UAC—Austin Peay, Central Arkansas, Eastern Kentucky, North Alabama, and West Georgia—will also join the all-sports UAC.
  - Going forward, the ASUN will retain its seven current members that do not play scholarship FCS football. Five of these schools do not sponsor football at all, Stetson plays non-scholarship FCS football in the Pioneer Football League, and Bellarmine plays the non-NCAA variant of sprint football.
- June 30 – Texas State announced it would join the Pac-12 Conference from the Sun Belt Conference in 2026–27.
- July 15 – Louisiana Tech announced it would replace Texas State in the Sun Belt Conference (SBC) from Conference USA (CUSA). Louisiana Tech will join the Sun Belt no later than July 1, 2027.
- July 21 – The American Athletic Conference announced it had dropped the word "Athletic" from its name, becoming the American Conference. The conference also retired the "AAC" initialism, which had been used more by media than by the conference itself; the official short form is now simply the word "American".
- August 13 – Tennessee Tech announced it would join the Southern Conference from the Ohio Valley Conference (OVC) in 2026–27.
- September 3 – UC San Diego announced it would join the West Coast Conference (WCC) from the Big West Conference in 2027–28.
- September 24 – The Loyola Phoenix, the student newspaper of Loyola University Chicago, announced that 106-year-old Sister Jean, who began her tenure at Loyola in 1991, and had been chaplain of the men's basketball team since 1994, retired for health reasons.
- October 2 – The Northeast Conference adopted its longstanding abbreviation of NEC as its official name.
- October 9 – Loyola Chicago announced that Sister Jean, the former basketball team chaplain who first came to prominence during the Ramblers' run in the 2018 NCAA tournament, died at age 106.
- October 10 – Little Rock announced that it would leave the OVC for the UAC in 2026–27.
- October 20 – The Associated Press named its preseason All-America team. The only unanimous selection, and also the only guard on the team, was Purdue's Braden Smith. The other honorees were Texas Tech forward JT Toppin, Michigan forward Yaxel Lendeborg, BYU forward AJ Dybantsa, and Florida forward Alex Condon.
- October 31 – The WCC announced that Denver would join from the Summit League in 2026–27.
- January 14, 2026 – At the annual NCAA convention, the Division I Cabinet approved changes to the transfer portal for several sports, including men's and women's basketball. Effective immediately:
  - A single 15-day portal was adopted for all D-I teams, opening the day after the final game of the NCAA tournament.
  - For players on teams undergoing a head coaching change, the portal will open for 15 days, starting 5 days after a new head coach is hired or publicly announced. If 30 days pass without the announcement of a new head coach, the portal will open for those players on the 31st day, as long as it falls after the championship game. This additional window is available only after the start of the standard portal.
  - Midyear transfers will not be eligible to play for their new school during that season if they were enrolled at an NCAA member institution during the first academic term, regardless of whether they competed.
- March 5 – After several months of failed negotiations between Louisiana Tech and CUSA over the school's terms of departure, the University of Louisiana System, of which Tech is a member, filed suit against CUSA on Tech's behalf in Lincoln Parish. The suit sought to allow Tech to join the SBC on the school's desired July 2026 schedule.
- March 16 – Aden Holloway, Alabama's second-leading scorer, was arrested on two drug-related felony charges. He was removed from the campus pending a university investigation, and Alabama played the NCAA tournament without him. Charging documents indicated that nearly a kilogram of marijuana was seized from his apartment.
- April 2 – West Florida announced that it accepted an invitation to join the Atlantic Sun from the Gulf South effective July 1, 2026, and begin reclassification from NCAA Division II to be eligible for NCAA-sponsored postseason play in 2028–29.

=== Milestones and records ===
- During the season, the following players reached the 2,000-career-point milestone: Indiana swingman Tucker DeVries, Gonzaga forward Graham Ike, Oklahoma guard Nijel Pack, Kansas State guard PJ Haggerty, SMU guard Jaron Pierre Jr., Ohio State guard Bruce Thornton, SMU guard Boopie Miller Texas guard Tramon Mark, and West Virginia guard Honor Huff.
- November 3 – Houston coach Kelvin Sampson earned his 800th career win following the Cougars' win in their season opener against Lehigh. The victory was also Sampson's 300th during his tenure at Houston.
- November 16 – Purdue coach Matt Painter earned his 500th career win following the Boilermakers' 97–79 win over Akron.
- November 25–26 – Michigan became the first team to achieve consecutive victories of 30 points or more against ranked opponents with back-to-back wins over Auburn (21) and Gonzaga (12).
- December 13 – Arizona became the fastest team to achieve victories over 5 ranked opponents in a season, doing so in their 9th game of the season with victories over Florida (3), UCLA (15), UConn (3), Auburn (20), and Alabama (12).
- December 16 – Duke coach Jon Scheyer surpassed Vic Bubas to become the fastest coach to reach 100 career wins in ACC history.
- January 3, 2026 – Purdue guard Braden Smith (893) surpassed former Michigan State guard Cassius Winston (890) to become the Big Ten's all-time leader in assists after he recorded 12 of them in their 89–73 road victory at Wisconsin.
- January 24 – St. John's coach Rick Pitino became just the fourth coach to earn 900 career wins after an 88–83 comeback road win at Xavier, who were led by his son Richard.
- January 28 – Southern Illinois coach Scott Nagy earned his 600th career win following the Salukis' 65–50 win over Northern Iowa.
- February 18
  - Arkansas true freshman guard Darius Acuff scored 49 points, the most by a freshman against a then-AP ranked team in men's college basketball history, on the road at then-#25 Alabama in Tuscaloosa in a 115–117 double overtime loss for the Razorbacks.
  - Butler coach Thad Matta earned his 500th career win following the Bulldogs' 93–89 win at Georgetown.
- March 6 – #19 Miami (Ohio) defeated Ohio 110–108 in overtime to cap a perfect 31–0 undefeated regular season. Miami became just the third team in men's Division I basketball history to enter a conference tournament 31–0, joining 2013–14 Wichita State and 2014–15 Kentucky, according to ESPN Research.
- March 7 – Ohio State guard Bruce Thornton (2,110) became the all-time leading scorer in school history, surpassing Dennis Hopson (2,096) after scoring 25 points in a 91–78 win over Indiana.
- March 9 – Santa Clara coach Herb Sendek earned his 600th career win after the Broncos beat Saint Mary's, 76–71, in the semifinals of the WCC tournament.
- March 13 – Following a 78–68 win over Seton Hall in the semifinals of the Big East tournament, St. John's became the eighth college basketball program in history to earn 2,000 all-time wins, joining Kansas, Kentucky, North Carolina, Duke, UCLA, Temple, and Syracuse.
- March 20 – Purdue guard Braden Smith (1,083) surpassed former Duke guard Bobby Hurley (1,076) to become the all-time career leader in assists in men's Division I basketball history, after recording 8 assists in their 104–71 win against Queens in the First Round of the NCAA Tournament. He would go on to finish his career with 1,103 assists.

== Conference membership changes ==
A total of six schools joined new conferences for the 2025–26 season. Of these, five moved within Division I, and one began reclassification from NCAA Division II.

School	Former conference	Current conference
Delaware	CAA	CUSA
Grand Canyon	Western Athletic	Mountain West
Missouri State	Missouri Valley	CUSA
New Haven	Northeast-10 (D–II)	NEC
Seattle	Western Athletic	West Coast
UMass	A-10	MAC

The 2025–26 season was the last in their respective conferences for at least 28 Division I schools. It was also the last season for West Florida before starting reclassification from Division II.

School	2025–26 conference	Future conference
Austin Peay	Atlantic Sun	United Athletic
Boise State	Mountain West	Pac-12
California Baptist	Western Athletic	Big West
Central Arkansas	Atlantic Sun	United Athletic
Colorado State	Mountain West	Pac-12
Denver	Summit	West Coast
Eastern Kentucky	Atlantic Sun	United Athletic
Fresno State	Mountain West	Pac-12
Gonzaga	West Coast	Pac-12
Hawaii	Big West	Mountain West
Little Rock	Ohio Valley	United Athletic
Louisiana Tech	CUSA	Sun Belt
North Alabama	Atlantic Sun	United Athletic
Northern Illinois	MAC	Horizon
Oregon State	West Coast	Pac-12
Sacramento State	Big Sky	Big West
Saint Francis	NEC	PAC (D–III)
San Diego State	Mountain West	Pac-12
Southern Utah	Western Athletic	Big Sky
Tennessee Tech	Ohio Valley	Southern
Texas State	Sun Belt	Pac-12
UC Davis	Big West	Mountain West
UTEP	CUSA	Mountain West
Utah State	Mountain West	Pac-12
Utah Tech	Western Athletic	Big Sky
Utah Valley	Western Athletic	Big West
Washington State	West Coast	Pac-12
West Florida	Gulf South (D–II)	Atlantic Sun
West Georgia	Atlantic Sun	United Athletic

== Arenas ==
=== New arenas ===
- St. Thomas left the Schoenecker Arena after 44 seasons for the new Lee & Penny Anderson Arena. In the second half of a men's and women's doubleheader that officially opened the new arena on November 8, 2025, the Tommies men defeated Army 83–76.
- Tarleton State left the Wisdom Gym after 55 seasons for the new EECU Center. The Texans defeated Texas A&M–Corpus Christi 85–77 in the first official men's game in the new arena on November 8, 2025.

=== Arena of new D-I team ===
- New Haven played its first Division I home game at the Jeffrey P. Hazell Athletics Center on November 8, losing 87–43 to Penn State.

=== Arena name changes ===
- The Wells Fargo Center in Philadelphia, Pennsylvania, one of the home arenas of the Villanova Wildcats, was renamed the Xfinity Mobile Arena on August 14, 2025. The change follows the expiration of Wells Fargo's naming rights agreement in August and a new naming rights deal with Xfinity Mobile, a subsidiary of Xfinity.
- The XL Center in Hartford, Connecticut, one of the home arenas of the UConn Huskies, was renamed to PeoplesBank Arena on June 2, 2025.

=== Other arena changes ===
- Northeastern played its last game at Matthews Arena on November 15, 2025 against Vermont, losing 85–74. The arena, which had originally opened in 1910, officially closed the next month, and is being demolished and replaced by a new arena and recreation center on the same site that is planned to open in 2028. In the meantime, the Huskies are playing home games at the smaller Cabot Center, already the primary home of Northeastern women's basketball.
- On February 27, 2026, the governing board of Miami University in Ohio approved a planned multipurpose on-campus arena to replace Millett Hall, currently home to the men's and women's basketball teams. The new arena is planned to open for the 2028–29 season.

== Seasonal outlook ==
The Top 25 from the AP and USA Today Coaching polls

=== Preseason polls ===
AP
Ranking	Team
1	Purdue (35)
2	Houston (16)
3	Florida (8)
4	UConn (2)
5	St. John's
6	Duke
7	Michigan
8	BYU
9	Kentucky
10	Texas Tech
11	Louisville
12	UCLA
13	Arizona
14	Arkansas
15	Alabama
16	Iowa State
17	Illinois
18	Tennessee
19	Kansas
20	Auburn
21	Gonzaga
22	Michigan State
23	Creighton
24	Wisconsin
25	North Carolina

USA Today Coaches
Ranking	Team
1	Purdue (18)
2	Houston (12)
3	Florida (1)
4	UConn
5	Duke
6	St. John's
7	Michigan
8	BYU
9	Kentucky
10	Louisville
11	Texas Tech
12	UCLA
13	Arizona
14	Illinois
15	Arkansas
16	Alabama
17	Tennessee
18	Iowa State
19	Kansas
20	Gonzaga
21	Michigan State
22	Auburn
23	Creighton
24	Wisconsin
25	North Carolina

=== Final polls ===
AP
Ranking	Team
1	Michigan (57)
2	UConn
3	Arizona
4	Duke
5	Illinois
6	Purdue
7	Houston
8	Iowa State
9	Florida
10	St. John's
11	Michigan State
12	Tennessee
13	Arkansas
14	Nebraska
15	Iowa
16	Alabama
17	Virginia
18	Gonzaga
19	Vanderbilt
20	Kansas
21	Texas Tech
22	Texas
23	Louisville
24	Miami (FL)
25	Wisconsin

USA Today Coaches
Ranking	Team
1	Michigan (31)
2	UConn
3	Arizona
4	Duke
5	Illinois
6	Houston
7	Purdue
8	Iowa State
9	Florida
10	St. John's
11	Michigan State
12	Tennessee
13	Arkansas
14	Nebraska
15	Virginia
16	Alabama
17	Vanderbilt
18	Gonzaga
19	Iowa
20	Kansas
21	Texas Tech
22	Miami (FL)
23	Louisville
24	Texas
25	Wisconsin

== Top 10 matchups ==
Rankings reflect the AP poll Top 25.

=== Regular season ===
- Nov. 13, 2025
  - No. 2 Purdue defeated No. 8 Alabama, 87–80 (Coleman Coliseum, Tuscaloosa, AL)
- Nov. 15
  - No. 3 UConn defeated No. 7 BYU, 86–84 (Hall of Fame Series – TD Garden, Boston, MA)
- Nov. 19
  - No. 4 Arizona defeated No. 3 UConn, 71–67 (Gampel Pavilion, Storrs, CT)
- Dec. 6
  - No. 10 Iowa State defeated No. 1 Purdue, 81–58 (Mackey Arena, West Lafayette, IN)
  - No. 4 Duke defeated No. 7 Michigan State, 66–60 (Breslin Student Events Center, East Lansing, MI)
- Jan. 27, 2026
  - No. 3 Michigan defeated No. 5 Nebraska, 75–72 (Crisler Center, Ann Arbor, MI)
- Jan. 30
  - No. 3 Michigan defeated No. 7 Michigan State, 83–71 (Rivalry – Breslin Student Events Center, East Lansing, MI)
- Feb. 1
  - No. 9 Illinois defeated No. 5 Nebraska, 78–69 (Pinnacle Bank Arena, Lincoln, NE)
- Feb. 7
  - No. 10 Michigan State defeated No. 5 Illinois, 85–82^{OT} (Breslin Student Events Center, East Lansing, MI)
- Feb. 9
  - No. 9 Kansas defeated No. 1 Arizona, 82–78 (Allen Fieldhouse, Lawrence, KS)
- Feb. 14
  - No. 5 Iowa State defeated No. 9 Kansas, 74–56 (Hilton Coliseum, Ames, IA)
- Feb. 16
  - No. 6 Iowa State defeated No. 2 Houston, 70–67 (Hilton Coliseum, Ames, IA)
- Feb. 17
  - No. 1 Michigan defeated No. 7 Purdue, 91–80 (Mackey Arena, West Lafayette, IN)
- Feb. 21
  - No. 4 Arizona defeated No. 2 Houston, 73–66 (Fertitta Center, Houston, TX)
  - No. 3 Duke defeated No. 1 Michigan, 68–63 (Rivalry/Duel in the District/College GameDay — Capital One Arena, Washington, D.C.)
- Feb. 27
  - No. 3 Michigan defeated No. 10 Illinois, 84–70 (State Farm Center, Champaign, IL)
- Feb. 28
  - No. 2 Arizona defeated No. 6 Iowa State, 73–57 (McKale Center, Tucson, AZ)
- Mar. 8
  - No. 3 Michigan defeated No. 8 Michigan State, 90–80 (Rivalry – Crisler Center, Ann Arbor, MI)

=== Conference tournament ===
- Mar. 13
  - No. 2 Arizona defeated No. 7 Iowa State, 82–80 (Big 12 Tournament – T-Mobile Center, Kansas City, MO)
- Mar. 14
  - No. 2 Arizona defeated No. 5 Houston, 79–74 (Big 12 Tournament – T-Mobile Center, Kansas City, MO)
  - No. 1 Duke defeated No. 10 Virginia, 74–70 (ACC Tournament – Spectrum Center, Charlotte, NC)

=== Postseason tournament ===
- Mar. 28
  - No. 2 Arizona defeated No. 8 Purdue, 79–64 (Elite Eight – SAP Center, San Jose, CA)
- Mar. 29
  - No. 7 UConn defeated No. 1 Duke, 73–72 (Elite Eight – Capital One Arena, Washington D.C.)
- Apr. 4
  - No. 3 Michigan defeated No. 2 Arizona, 91–73 (Final Four – Lucas Oil Stadium, Indianapolis, IN)
- Apr. 6
  - No. 3 Michigan defeated No. 7 UConn, 69–63 (National Championship Game – Lucas Oil Stadium, Indianapolis, IN)

== Regular season ==
=== Early-season tournaments ===
Names	Dates	Location	Teams	Champion	Runner-up	3rd-place winner
Bahamas Championship	November 20–21, 2025	Baha Mar Convention Center (Nassau, Bahamas)	4	Purdue	Texas Tech	Wake Forest
Hall of Fame Classic	November 20–21, 2025	T-Mobile Center (Kansas City, MO)	4	Nebraska	Kansas State	New Mexico
Boardwalk Battle	November 20 & 22, 2025	Ocean Center (Daytona Beach, FL)	4	High Point	Incarnate Word	UIC
Greenbrier Tip-Off	November 15–23, 2025	The Greenbrier (White Sulphur Springs, WV)	8	Kent State (River); Butler (Mountain)	Wright State (River); Virginia (Mountain)	Cleveland State (River); Northwestern (Mountain)
Charleston Classic	November 21 & 23, 2025	TD Arena (Charleston, SC)	8	Utah State (Lowcountry); Clemson (Palmetto)	Davidson (Lowcountry); Georgia (Palmetto)	Tulane (Lowcountry); Xavier (Palmetto)
Pensacola Invitational	November 22–23, 2025	Pensacola Bay Center (Pensacola, FL)	4	Southern Miss	UT Martin	Prairie View A&M
Paradise Jam	November 21–24, 2025	Sports and Fitness Center (Charlotte Amalie West, VI)	8	Yale	Akron	Charleston
Sunshine Slam	November 24–25, 2025	Ocean Center (Daytona Beach, FL)	8	George Mason (Beach); Pacific (Ocean)	Florida Atlantic (Beach); Jacksonville (Ocean)	Loyola Marymount (Beach); Stony Brook (Ocean)
Coconut Hoops	November 24 & 26, 2025	Alico Arena (Fort Myers, FL)	4	Belmont	Toledo	Troy
Maui Invitational	November 24–26, 2025	Lahaina Civic Center (Lahaina, HI)	8	USC	Arizona State	Seton Hall
Acrisure Classic	November 25–26, 2025	Acrisure Arena (Thousand Palms, CA)	4	Iowa	Grand Canyon	Utah
Acrisure Holiday Invitational	November 25–26, 2025	Acrisure Arena (Thousand Palms, CA)	4	Tulsa	Northern Iowa	San Jose State
Players Era Festival	November 24–27, 2025	MGM Grand Garden Arena (Las Vegas, NV)	18	Michigan	Gonzaga	Kansas
ESPN Events Invitational	November 24–28, 2025	State Farm Field House (Lake Buena Vista, FL)	16	UC San Diego (Adventure); Illinois State (Imagination); BYU (Magic)	Towson (Adventure); Furman (Imagination); Dayton (Magic)	Bradley (Adventure); Richmond (Imagination); Miami (Magic)
Battle 4 Atlantis	November 26–28, 2025	Imperial Arena (Paradise Island, Bahamas)	8	Vanderbilt	Saint Mary's	VCU
Acrisure Holiday Classic	November 27–28, 2025	Acrisure Arena (Thousand Palms, CA)	4	Colorado	Washington	Nevada
Acrisure Invitational	November 27–28, 2025	Acrisure Arena (Thousand Palms, CA)	4	Stanford	Saint Louis	Santa Clara
Rady Children's Invitational	November 27–28, 2025	Jenny Craig Pavilion (San Diego, CA)	4	TCU	Wisconsin	Florida
Emerald Coast Classic	November 28–29, 2025	Raider Arena (Niceville, FL)	4	LSU	DePaul	Drake
Resorts World Las Vegas Classic	November 28–29, 2025	Resorts World Event Center (Winchester, Nevada)	4	UC Santa Barbara	Seattle	Lehigh
Big 5 Classic	November 8–December 6, 2025	Xfinity Mobile Arena (final rounds) (Philadelphia, PA)	6	Villanova	Penn	Saint Joseph's
Sun Bowl Invitational	December 21–22, 2025	Don Haskins Center (El Paso, TX)	4	UC Irvine	Norfolk State	UTEP

=== Head-to-head conference challenges ===
Conference matchup	Dates	Conference winner	Conference loser	Record
ACC–SEC Challenge	December 2–3	SEC	ACC	**9–7**
ASUN–SoCon Challenge	November 9–29	SoCon	Atlantic Sun	**10–9**
Big Sky–Summit Challenge	December 3–7	Big Sky	Summit	**11–7**
MAC–SBC Challenge	November 3 – February 7	SBC	MAC	**14–12**

=== Upsets ===
An upset is a victory by an underdog team. In the context of NCAA Division I men's basketball, this generally constitutes an unranked team defeating a team currently ranked in the top 25. This list will highlight those upsets of ranked teams by unranked teams as well as upsets of No. 1 teams. Rankings are from the AP poll.

Bold type indicates winning teams in "true road games"—i.e., those played on an opponent's home court (including secondary homes). Italics type indicates winning teams in an early season tournament (or event). Early season tournaments are tournaments played in the early season. Events are the tournaments with the same teams in it every year (even rivalry games).

Unranked Seton Hall's neutral site win over 23rd-ranked NC State broke a streak of 96 consecutive games won by ranked teams against unranked opponents to start the season, the longest such stretch in a season in AP Poll history.

Winner	Score	Loser	Date	Tournament/event	Spread	Notes
Seton Hall	85–74	No. 23 NC State	November 24, 2025	Maui Invitational	NC State -10.5	
California	80–72	No. 18 UCLA	November 25, 2025	Empire Classic	Ucla -7.5	
Kansas	81–76	No. 17 Tennessee	November 26, 2025	Players Era Festival	Tennessee -3.5	
Texas	102–97	No. 23 NC State	November 26, 2025	Maui Invitational	NC State -1.5 to -2.5	
TCU	84–80	No. 10 Florida	November 27, 2025	Rady Children's Invitational	Florida -11.5	
Syracuse	62–60	No. 13 Tennessee	December 2, 2025	ACC–SEC Challenge	Tennessee -7.5	First win over Tennessee since 1993
Minnesota	73–64	No. 22 Indiana	December 3, 2025		Indiana -7.5	
**No. 10 Iowa State**	81–58	No. 1 Purdue	December 6, 2025		Purdue -4.5	Largest nonconference home loss by a No. 1 team since 1993
**Washington**	84–76	No. 24 USC	December 6, 2025		USC -4.5	
Kentucky	78–66	No. 22 St. John's	December 20, 2025	CBS Sports Classic		
Virginia Tech	95–85^{3OT}	No. 21 Virginia	December 31, 2025	Rivalry		
Stanford	80–76	No. 16 Louisville	January 2, 2026			
UCF	81–75	No. 17 Kansas	January 3, 2026			
SMU	97–83	No. 12 North Carolina	January 3, 2026			
Missouri	76–74	No. 22 Florida	January 3, 2026			
Florida	92–77	No. 18 Georgia	January 6, 2026			
Minnesota	70–67	No. 19 Iowa	January 6, 2026			
Oklahoma State	87–76	No. 25 UCF	January 6, 2026			
Clemson	74–70	No. 24 SMU	January 7, 2026			
West Virginia	86–75	No. 22 Kansas	January 10, 2026			
Florida	91–67	No. 21 Tennessee	January 10, 2026			
**Wisconsin**	91–88	No. 2 Michigan	January 10, 2026			
Auburn	95–73	No. 15 Arkansas	January 10, 2026			
**Texas**	92–88	No. 13 Alabama	January 10, 2026			
Kansas	84–63	No. 2 Iowa State	January 13, 2026			
**Ole Miss**	97–95^{OT}	No. 21 Georgia	January 14, 2026			
Texas	80–64	No. 10 Vanderbilt	January 14, 2026			
Stanford	95–90	No. 14 North Carolina	January 14, 2026			
**Butler**	77–66	No. 25 Seton Hall	January 17, 2026			
**Kentucky**	80–78	No. 24 Tennessee	January 17, 2026	Rivalry		
Cincinnati	79–70	No. 2 Iowa State	January 17, 2026			
Grand Canyon	84–74	No. 23 Utah State	January 17, 2026			
California	84–78	No. 14 North Carolina	January 17, 2026			
**NC State**	80–76^{OT}	No. 18 Clemson	January 20, 2026			
UCLA	69–67	No. 4 Purdue	January 20, 2026			
Texas	87–67	No. 21 Georgia	January 24, 2026			
**Auburn**	76–67	No. 16 Florida	January 24, 2026			First win for Auburn in Gainesville since 1996.
**Tennessee**	79–73	No. 17 Alabama	January 24, 2026			First five game winning streak vs. Alabama since 1968–72.
Indiana	72–67	No. 12 Purdue	January 27, 2026	Rivalry/Indiana National Guard Governor's Cup		
UCF	88–80	No. 11 Texas Tech	January 31, 2026			
**Kentucky**	85–77	No. 15 Arkansas	January 31, 2026			
Minnesota	76–73	No. 10 Michigan State	February 4, 2026			First win over an AP top-10 team in five years
Oklahoma State	99–92	No. 16 BYU	February 4, 2026			
Portland	87–80	No. 6 Gonzaga	February 4, 2026		Gonzaga -22.5	First win over an AP top-10 team and first win over Gonzaga since 2014
**Oklahoma**	92–91	No. 15 Vanderbilt	February 7, 2026			
Kentucky	74–71	No. 25 Tennessee	February 7, 2026	Rivalry		
No. 9 Kansas	82–78	No. 1 Arizona	February 9, 2026			First win over a No. 1 ranked team at Allen Fieldhouse
Miami (FL)	75–66	No. 11 North Carolina	February 10, 2026			
**Wisconsin**	92–90^{OT}	No. 8 Illinois	February 10, 2026			First win in overtime against Illinois
TCU	62–55	No. 5 Iowa State	February 10, 2026			
**Virginia Tech**	76–66	No. 20 Clemson	February 11, 2026			
Wisconsin	92–71	No. 10 Michigan State	February 13, 2026			
**No. 16 Texas Tech**	78–75^{OT}	No. 1 Arizona	February 14, 2026			
SMU	95–85	No. 21 Louisville	February 17, 2026			
NC State	82–58	No. 16 North Carolina	February 17, 2026	Rivalry/Tobacco Road		Largest win over North Carolina since 1962
Rhode Island	81–76	No. 18 Saint Louis	February 17, 2026			First win over a ranked team since 2017
Ohio State	86–69	No. 24 Wisconsin	February 17, 2026			
Iowa	57–52	No. 9 Nebraska	February 17, 2026			
Arizona State	72–67	No. 13 Texas Tech	February 17, 2026			
**Creighton**	91–84	No. 5 UConn	February 18, 2026			
Missouri	81–80	No. 19 Vanderbilt	February 18, 2026			
**Cincinnati**	84–68	No. 8 Kansas	February 21, 2026			First away win over a top–10 ranked team since 1990
**Tennessee**	69–65	No. 19 Vanderbilt	February 21, 2026	Rivalry		
No. 3 Duke	68–63	No. 1 Michigan	February 21, 2026	Rivalry/Capital Showcase		Game played in Washington, D.C.
UCLA	95–94^{OT}	No. 10 Illinois	February 21, 2026			
Dayton	77–62	No. 23 Saint Louis	February 24, 2026			
Missouri	73–69	No. 22 Tennessee	February 24, 2026			
**UCF**	97–84	No. 19 BYU	February 24, 2026			
Kentucky	91–77	No. 25 Vanderbilt	February 28, 2026			
Clemson	80–75	No. 24 Louisville	February 28, 2026			
West Virginia	79–71	No. 19 BYU	February 28, 2026			
Saint Mary's	70–59	No. 9 Gonzaga	February 28, 2026	Rivalry		
Ohio State	82–74	No. 8 Purdue	March 1, 2026			
Georgia	98–88	No. 16 Alabama	March 3, 2026			
**TCU**	73–65	No. 10 Texas Tech	March 3, 2026			
Arizona State	70–60	No. 14 Kansas	March 3, 2026			
UCLA	72–52	No. 9 Nebraska	March 3, 2026			
Marquette	68–62	No. 4 UConn	March 7, 2026			
**Louisville**	92–89	No. 22 Miami (FL)	March 7, 2026			
George Mason	86–57	No. 25 Saint Louis	March 7, 2026			
**Wisconsin**	97–93	No. 15 Purdue	March 7, 2026			
BYU	82–76	No. 10 Texas Tech	March 7, 2026			
Santa Clara	76–71	No. 21 Saint Mary's	March 9, 2026	West Coast Tournament		
UMass	87–83	No. 20 Miami (OH)	March 12, 2026	MAC Tournament		
Miami (FL)	78–73	No. 24 Louisville	March 12, 2026	ACC Tournament		
Clemson	80–79	No. 19 North Carolina	March 12, 2026	ACC Tournament		
Ole Miss	80–79	No. 15 Alabama	March 13, 2026	SEC Tournament		
UCLA	88–84	No. 8 Michigan State	March 13, 2026	Big Ten Tournament		

==== Non-Division I team wins over Division I teams ====
In addition to the above-listed upsets in which an unranked team defeated a ranked team, there have been six non-Division I teams that defeated a Division I team so far this season.

Bold type indicates winning teams in "true road games"—i.e., those played on an opponent's home court (including secondary homes). Italics type indicates winning teams in an early season tournament (or event). Early season tournaments are tournaments played in the early season. Events are the tournaments with the same teams in it every year (even rivalry games).

Winner	Score	Loser	Date	Tournament/event	Notes
**Hawaii Pacific** (Division II)	79–78	Boise State	November 3, 2025		
**Northwood (MI)** (Division II)	85–81	Western Michigan	November 6, 2025		
**Wilmington (DE)** (Division II)	71–62	Delaware	November 7, 2025		
**North Greenville** (Division II)	92–81	Gardner–Webb	November 10, 2025		
Virginia State (Division II)	62–58	Delaware State	November 26, 2025	HBCU in DC Tip-Off	
**Montana Tech** (NAIA)	82–75	Montana	December 17, 2025		

=== Conference winners and tournaments ===
Each of the 31 Division I athletic conferences will end its regular season with a single-elimination tournament. The team with the best regular-season record in each conference receives the number one seed in each tournament, with tiebreakers used as needed in the case of ties for the top seeding. Unless otherwise noted, the winners of these tournaments will receive automatic invitations to the 2026 NCAA Division I men's basketball tournament.

Conference	Regular season first place	Conference player of the year	Conference coach of the year	Conference tournament	Tournament venue (city)	Tournament winner
America East Conference	UMBC	TJ Hurley, Vermont	Jim Ferry, UMBC	2026 America East men's basketball tournament	Campus sites	UMBC
American Conference	South Florida	Izaiyah Nelson, South Florida	Bryan Hodgson, South Florida	2026 American Conference men's basketball tournament	Legacy Arena (Birmingham, AL)	South Florida
Atlantic 10 Conference	Saint Louis (Note: Top seed in conference tournament.) & VCU	Robbie Avila, Saint Louis	Steve Donahue, Saint Joseph’s	2026 Atlantic 10 men's basketball tournament	PPG Paints Arena (Pittsburgh, PA)	VCU
Atlantic Coast Conference	Duke	Cameron Boozer, Duke	Jon Scheyer, Duke	2026 ACC men's basketball tournament	Spectrum Center (Charlotte, NC)	Duke
Atlantic Sun Conference	Austin Peay & Central Arkansas	Camren Hunter, Central Arkansas	John Shulman, Central Arkansas	2026 Atlantic Sun men's basketball tournament	VyStar Veterans Memorial Arena (Jacksonville, FL)	Queens
Big 12 Conference	Arizona	Jaden Bradley, Arizona	Tommy Lloyd, Arizona	2026 Big 12 men's basketball tournament	T-Mobile Center (Kansas City, MO)	Arizona
Big East Conference	St. John's	Zuby Ejiofor, St. John's	Shaheen Holloway, Seton Hall	2026 Big East men's basketball tournament	Madison Square Garden (New York, NY)	St. John's
Big Sky Conference	Portland State	Terri Miller Jr., Portland State	Jase Coburn, Portland State	2026 Big Sky Conference men's basketball tournament	Idaho Central Arena (Boise, ID)	Idaho
Big South Conference	High Point	Logan Duncomb, Winthrop	Flynn Clayman, High Point & Mark Prosser, Winthrop	2026 Big South Conference men's basketball tournament	Freedom Hall Civic Center (Johnson City, TN)	High Point
Big Ten Conference	Michigan	Yaxel Lendeborg, Michigan	Fred Hoiberg, Nebraska (Coaches) & Dusty May, Michigan (Media)	2026 Big Ten men's basketball tournament	United Center (Chicago, IL)	Purdue
Big West Conference	UC Irvine	Josiah Davis, Cal State Northridge	Dedrique Taylor, Cal State Fullerton	2026 Big West Conference men's basketball tournament	Dollar Loan Center (Henderson, NV)	Hawaii
Coastal Athletic Association	UNC Wilmington	Cruz Davis, Hofstra	Takayo Siddle, UNC Wilmington	2026 CAA men's basketball tournament	CareFirst Arena (Washington, DC)	Hofstra
Conference USA	Liberty	Zach Cleveland, Liberty	Ritchie McKay, Liberty & Chris Mudge, Sam Houston	2026 Conference USA men's basketball tournament	Von Braun Center (Huntsville, AL)	Kennesaw State
Horizon League	Wright State	DeSean Goode, Robert Morris	Clint Sargent, Wright State	2026 Horizon League men's basketball tournament	First two rounds: Campus sites Final three rounds: Corteva Coliseum (Indianapolis, IN)	Wright State
Ivy League	Yale	Nick Townsend, Yale	Harvard staff & Yale staff (Note: The Ivy League and Patriot League present their top coaching honor to an entire staff instead of the head coach, with all staff members individually named in the award announcement.)	2026 Ivy League men's basketball tournament	Newman Arena (Ithaca, NY)	Penn
Metro Atlantic Athletic Conference	Merrimack	Kevair Kennedy, Merrimack	Joe Gallo, Merrimack	2026 MAAC men's basketball tournament	Boardwalk Hall (Atlantic City, NJ)	Siena
Mid-American Conference	Miami (OH)	Peter Suder, Miami (OH)	Travis Steele, Miami (OH)	2026 Mid-American Conference men's basketball tournament	Rocket Arena (Cleveland, OH)	Akron
Mid-Eastern Athletic Conference	Howard	Bryce Harris, Howard	Kevin Broadus, Morgan State	2026 MEAC men's basketball tournament	Norfolk Scope (Norfolk, VA)	Howard
Missouri Valley Conference	Belmont	Tyler Lundblade, Belmont	Casey Alexander, Belmont	2026 Missouri Valley Conference men's basketball tournament	Enterprise Center (St. Louis, MO)	Northern Iowa
Mountain West Conference	Utah State	Mason Falslev, Utah State	Jerrod Calhoun, Utah State	2026 Mountain West Conference men's basketball tournament	Thomas & Mack Center (Paradise, NV)	Utah State
Northeast Conference	LIU	Darin Smith Jr., Central Connecticut	Rod Strickland, LIU	2026 NEC men's basketball tournament	Campus sites	LIU
Ohio Valley Conference	Morehead State & Tennessee State	Aaron Nkrumah, Tennessee State	Jonathan Mattox, Morehead State & Nolan Smith, Tennessee State	2026 Ohio Valley Conference men's basketball tournament	Ford Center (Evansville, IN)	Tennessee State
Patriot League	Navy	Austin Benigni, Navy	Navy staff (Note: The Ivy League and Patriot League present their top coaching honor to an entire staff instead of the head coach, with all staff members individually named in the award announcement.)	2026 Patriot League men's basketball tournament	Campus sites	Lehigh
Southeastern Conference	Florida	Darius Acuff Jr., Arkansas	Todd Golden, Florida	2026 SEC men's basketball tournament	Bridgestone Arena (Nashville, TN)	Arkansas
Southern Conference	East Tennessee State	Jadin Booth, Samford	Brooks Savage, East Tennessee State	2026 Southern Conference men's basketball tournament	Harrah's Cherokee Center (Asheville, NC)	Furman
Southland Conference	Stephen F. Austin	Keon Thompson, Stephen F. Austin	Matt Braeuer, Stephen F. Austin	2026 Southland Conference men's basketball tournament	Townsley Law Arena (Lake Charles, LA)	McNeese
Southwestern Athletic Conference	Bethune–Cookman	Daeshun Ruffin, Jackson State	Reggie Theus, Bethune–Cookman	2026 SWAC men's basketball tournament	Gateway Center Arena (College Park, GA)	Prairie View A&M
Summit League	North Dakota State	Carson Johnson, Denver	David Richman, North Dakota State	2026 Summit League men's basketball tournament	Denny Sanford Premier Center (Sioux Falls, SD)	North Dakota State
Sun Belt Conference	Troy	Chaze Harris, South Alabama	Scott Cross, Troy	2026 Sun Belt Conference men's basketball tournament	Pensacola Bay Center (Pensacola, FL)	Troy
West Coast Conference	Gonzaga & Saint Mary's	Graham Ike, Gonzaga	Herb Sendek, Santa Clara	2026 West Coast Conference men's basketball tournament	Orleans Arena (Paradise, NV)	Gonzaga
Western Athletic Conference	Utah Valley	Dominique Daniels Jr., California Baptist	Jon Judkins, Utah Tech	2026 WAC men's basketball tournament	Orleans Arena (Paradise, NV)	California Baptist

=== Statistical leaders ===
Source for additional stats categories

**Points per game**			**Rebounds per game**			**Assists per game**			**Steals per game**		
Player	School	PPG	Player	School	RPG	Player	School	APG	Player	School	SPG
AJ Dybantsa	BYU	25.5	Hannes Steinbach	Washington	11.8	Jeremy Fears Jr.	Michigan St.	9.4	Javontae Campbell	Bowling Green	3.0
Jordan Riley	E. Carolina	23.6	Justin Neely	UNC Greensboro	11.5	Braden Smith	Purdue	8.8	Aaron Nkrumah	Tennessee St.	2.8
Darius Acuff Jr.	Arkansas	23.5	Delrecco Gillespie	Kent St.	11.3	Donovan Dent	UCLA	7.6	Tyler Cochran	Rhode Island	2.7
PJ Haggerty	Kansas St.	23.4	Rueben Chinyelu	Florida	11.2	Josiah Davis	Cal State Northridge	7.4	Duke Miles	Vanderbilt	2.6
Daeshun Ruffin	Jackson St.	23.3	Michael Ajayi	Butler	11.1	Christian Anderson Jr.	Texas Tech	7.4	Prophet Johnson	Sacramento St.	2.6

**Blocked shots per game**			**Field goal percentage**			**Three-point field goal percentage**			**Free throw percentage**		
Player	School	BPG	Player	School	FG%	Player	School	3FG%	Player	School	FT%
Kyle Evans	UC Irvine	3.3	Aidan Kehoe	Navy	73.1	Milan Momcilovic	Iowa St.	48.7	Tyler Lundblade	Belmont	93.4
Ugonna Onyenso	Virginia	2.9	Ben Defty	Boston U.	69.4	Brett Decker	Liberty	47.1	Isaiah Moses	E. Washington	93.4
Will Heimbrodt	Seattle	2.6	Ven-Allen Lubin	NC St.	66.8	Donovan Atwell	Texas Tech	45.8	Coleton Benson	New Orleans	92.8
Flory Bidunga	Kansas	2.6	Aday Mara	Michigan	66.8	Nijel Pack	Oklahoma	44.7	Terrance Jones	Manhattan	92.6
Devin Williams	FAU	2.6	Max Frazier	C. Connecticut	65.8	Michael McNair	Boston U.	44.4	Kenny Noland	Columbia	92.1

== Conference standings ==
2025–26 America East Conference men's basketball standings
	Conf.				Overall
Team	W		L	PCT	W		L	PCT
UMBC †	14	–	2	.875	24	–	9	.727
Vermont	12	–	4	.750	22	–	12	.647
NJIT	10	–	6	.625	16	–	17	.485
UMass Lowell	9	–	7	.563	15	–	18	.455
Albany	7	–	9	.438	11	–	21	.344
Maine	6	–	10	.375	8	–	24	.250
Bryant	5	–	11	.313	9	–	22	.290
New Hampshire	5	–	11	.313	9	–	21	.300
Binghamton	4	–	12	.250	8	–	23	.258
† 2026 AmEast tournament winner

2025–26 American Conference men's basketball standings
	Conf.				Overall
Team	W		L	PCT	W		L	PCT
South Florida †	15	–	3	.833	25	–	9	.735
Wichita State	13	–	5	.722	24	–	12	.667
Tulsa	13	–	5	.722	30	–	8	.789
UAB	11	–	7	.611	20	–	12	.625
Charlotte	9	–	9	.500	17	–	17	.500
North Texas	9	–	9	.500	19	–	14	.576
Florida Atlantic	9	–	9	.500	18	–	15	.545
Memphis	8	–	10	.444	13	–	19	.406
Tulane	8	–	10	.444	18	–	15	.545
Temple	8	–	10	.444	16	–	16	.500
Rice	7	–	11	.389	13	–	18	.419
East Carolina	6	–	12	.333	11	–	20	.355
UTSA	1	–	17	.056	5	–	25	.167
† 2026 American tournament winner

2025–26 Atlantic 10 men's basketball standings
	Conf.				Overall
Team	W		L	PCT	W		L	PCT
Saint Louis	15	–	3	.833	29	–	6	.829
VCU †	15	–	3	.833	28	–	8	.778
Saint Joseph's	13	–	5	.722	24	–	12	.667
Dayton	12	–	6	.667	25	–	12	.676
George Mason	11	–	7	.611	23	–	10	.697
Davidson	10	–	8	.556	20	–	14	.588
Duquesne	9	–	9	.500	18	–	15	.545
Fordham	8	–	10	.444	17	–	15	.531
George Washington	8	–	10	.444	19	–	16	.543
Rhode Island	7	–	11	.389	16	–	16	.500
Richmond	5	–	13	.278	15	–	17	.469
La Salle	5	–	13	.278	9	–	23	.281
St. Bonaventure	4	–	14	.222	17	–	17	.500
Loyola Chicago	4	–	14	.222	9	–	24	.273
† 2026 A-10 tournament winner

2025–26 ACC men's basketball standings
	Conf.				Overall
Team	W		L	PCT	W		L	PCT
No. 4 Duke †	17	–	1	.944	35	–	3	.921
No. 17 Virginia	15	–	3	.833	30	–	6	.833
No. 24 Miami (FL)	13	–	5	.722	26	–	9	.743
North Carolina	12	–	6	.667	24	–	9	.727
Clemson	12	–	6	.667	24	–	11	.686
No. 23 Louisville	11	–	7	.611	24	–	11	.686
NC State	10	–	8	.556	20	–	14	.588
Florida State	10	–	8	.556	18	–	15	.545
California	9	–	9	.500	22	–	12	.647
Stanford	9	–	9	.500	20	–	13	.606
SMU	8	–	10	.444	20	–	14	.588
Virginia Tech	8	–	10	.444	19	–	13	.594
Wake Forest	7	–	11	.389	18	–	17	.514
Syracuse	6	–	12	.333	15	–	17	.469
Pittsburgh	5	–	13	.278	13	–	20	.394
Notre Dame	4	–	14	.222	13	–	18	.419
Boston College	4	–	14	.222	11	–	20	.355
Georgia Tech	2	–	16	.111	11	–	20	.355
† 2026 ACC tournament winner Rankings from AP Poll

2025–26 ASUN men's basketball standings
	Conf.				Overall
Team	W		L	PCT	W		L	PCT
Central Arkansas	15	–	3	.833	22	–	12	.647
Austin Peay	15	–	3	.833	22	–	9	.710
Queens †	13	–	5	.722	21	–	14	.600
Lipscomb	12	–	6	.667	19	–	13	.594
Florida Gulf Coast	8	–	10	.444	16	–	18	.471
West Georgia*	8	–	10	.444	15	–	17	.469
Eastern Kentucky	7	–	11	.389	11	–	21	.344
Bellarmine	7	–	11	.389	13	–	19	.406
Jacksonville	7	–	11	.389	12	–	20	.375
Stetson	7	–	11	.389	12	–	21	.364
North Florida	5	–	13	.278	7	–	25	.219
North Alabama	4	–	14	.222	9	–	21	.300
† 2026 ASUN tournament winner * ineligible for the 2026 NCAA tournament due to transition from Division II

2025–26 Big 12 men's basketball standings
	Conf.				Overall
Team	W		L	PCT	W		L	PCT
No. 3 Arizona †	16	–	2	.889	36	–	3	.923
No. 7 Houston	14	–	4	.778	30	–	7	.811
No. 20 Kansas	12	–	6	.667	24	–	11	.686
No. 21 Texas Tech	12	–	6	.667	23	–	11	.676
No. 8 Iowa State	12	–	6	.667	29	–	8	.784
TCU	11	–	7	.611	23	–	12	.657
West Virginia	9	–	9	.500	21	–	14	.600
UCF	9	–	9	.500	21	–	12	.636
Cincinnati	9	–	9	.500	18	–	15	.545
BYU	9	–	9	.500	23	–	12	.657
Colorado	7	–	11	.389	17	–	16	.515
Arizona State	7	–	11	.389	17	–	16	.515
Baylor	6	–	12	.333	17	–	17	.500
Oklahoma State	6	–	12	.333	20	–	15	.571
Kansas State	3	–	15	.167	12	–	20	.375
Utah	2	–	16	.111	10	–	22	.313
† 2026 Big 12 tournament winner Rankings from AP poll

2025–26 Big East men's basketball standings
	Conf.				Overall
Team	W		L	PCT	W		L	PCT
No. 10 St. John's †	18	–	2	.900	30	–	7	.811
No. 2 UConn	17	–	3	.850	34	–	6	.850
Villanova	15	–	5	.750	24	–	9	.727
Seton Hall	10	–	10	.500	21	–	12	.636
Creighton	9	–	11	.450	16	–	18	.471
DePaul	8	–	12	.400	16	–	16	.500
Marquette	7	–	13	.350	12	–	20	.375
Butler	7	–	13	.350	16	–	16	.500
Providence	7	–	13	.350	15	–	18	.455
Xavier	6	–	14	.300	15	–	18	.455
Georgetown	6	–	14	.300	16	–	18	.471
† 2026 Big East tournament winner Rankings from AP poll

2025–26 Big Sky men's basketball standings
	Conf.				Overall
Team	W		L	PCT	W		L	PCT
Portland State	13	–	5	.722	20	–	11	.645
Montana State	12	–	6	.667	18	–	14	.563
Eastern Washington	11	–	7	.611	14	–	19	.424
Montana	10	–	8	.556	18	–	16	.529
Northern Colorado	10	–	8	.556	20	–	12	.625
Weber State	10	–	8	.556	16	–	16	.500
Idaho †	9	–	9	.500	21	–	15	.583
Sacramento State	6	–	12	.333	10	–	21	.323
Idaho State	5	–	13	.278	13	–	20	.394
Northern Arizona	4	–	14	.222	10	–	22	.313
† 2026 Big Sky tournament winner

2025–26 Big South men's basketball standings
	Conf.				Overall
Team	W		L	PCT	W		L	PCT
High Point †	15	–	1	.938	31	–	5	.861
Winthrop	13	–	3	.813	23	–	11	.676
Radford	9	–	7	.563	16	–	16	.500
UNC Asheville	8	–	8	.500	15	–	17	.469
Longwood	8	–	8	.500	16	–	16	.500
Presbyterian	7	–	9	.438	15	–	18	.455
Charleston Southern	6	–	10	.375	15	–	17	.469
USC Upstate	5	–	11	.313	13	–	19	.406
Gardner–Webb	1	–	15	.063	4	–	29	.121
† 2026 Big South tournament winner

2025–26 Big Ten Conference men's basketball standings
	Conf.				Overall
Team	W		L	PCT	W		L	PCT
No. 1 Michigan	19	–	1	.950	37	–	3	.925
No. 14 Nebraska	15	–	5	.750	28	–	7	.800
No. 5 Illinois	15	–	5	.750	28	–	9	.757
No. 11 Michigan State	15	–	5	.750	27	–	8	.771
No. 25 Wisconsin	14	–	6	.700	24	–	11	.686
No. 6 Purdue †	13	–	7	.650	30	–	9	.769
UCLA	13	–	7	.650	24	–	12	.667
Ohio State	12	–	8	.600	21	–	13	.618
No. 15 Iowa	10	–	10	.500	24	–	13	.649
Indiana	9	–	11	.450	18	–	14	.563
Minnesota	8	–	12	.400	15	–	18	.455
USC	7	–	13	.350	18	–	14	.563
Washington	7	–	13	.350	16	–	17	.485
Rutgers	6	–	14	.300	14	–	20	.412
Northwestern	5	–	15	.250	15	–	19	.441
Oregon	5	–	15	.250	12	–	20	.375
Maryland	4	–	16	.200	12	–	21	.364
Penn State	3	–	17	.150	12	–	20	.375
† 2026 Big Ten tournament winner Rankings from AP poll

2025–26 Big West Conference men's basketball standings
	Conf.				Overall
Team	W		L	PCT	W		L	PCT
UC Irvine	15	–	5	.750	23	–	12	.657
Hawai'i †	14	–	6	.700	24	–	9	.727
Cal State Fullerton	12	–	8	.600	18	–	16	.529
Cal State Northridge	12	–	8	.600	20	–	14	.588
UC San Diego	12	–	8	.600	23	–	11	.676
UC Davis	11	–	9	.550	19	–	14	.576
UC Santa Barbara	11	–	9	.550	18	–	14	.563
Cal Poly	10	–	10	.500	14	–	19	.424
Long Beach State	6	–	14	.300	10	–	22	.313
UC Riverside	5	–	15	.250	10	–	22	.313
Cal State Bakersfield	2	–	18	.100	8	–	24	.250
† 2026 Big West tournament winner

2025–26 CAA men's basketball standings
	Conf.				Overall
Team	W		L	PCT	W		L	PCT
UNC Wilmington	15	–	3	.833	27	–	7	.794
Charleston	14	–	4	.778	21	–	11	.656
Hofstra †	12	–	6	.667	24	–	11	.686
Monmouth	11	–	7	.611	19	–	15	.559
Drexel	10	–	8	.556	17	–	16	.515
William & Mary	10	–	8	.556	20	–	12	.625
Towson	9	–	9	.500	19	–	15	.559
Stony Brook	9	–	9	.500	17	–	15	.531
Campbell	8	–	10	.444	16	–	18	.471
Hampton	7	–	11	.389	13	–	19	.406
Elon	6	–	12	.333	14	–	18	.438
North Carolina A&T	4	–	14	.222	11	–	19	.367
Northeastern	2	–	16	.111	7	–	24	.226
† 2026 CAA tournament winner

2025–26 Conference USA men's basketball standings
	Conf.				Overall
Team	W		L	PCT	W		L	PCT
Liberty	17	–	3	.850	26	–	8	.765
Sam Houston	13	–	7	.650	22	–	12	.647
Western Kentucky	11	–	9	.550	18	–	14	.563
Louisiana Tech	11	–	9	.550	20	–	14	.588
Middle Tennessee	11	–	9	.550	17	–	15	.531
Kennesaw State †	10	–	10	.500	21	–	14	.600
Jacksonville State	10	–	10	.500	15	–	17	.469
FIU	8	–	12	.400	15	–	17	.469
Missouri State	8	–	12	.400	16	–	18	.471
New Mexico State	8	–	12	.400	16	–	16	.500
UTEP	7	–	13	.350	11	–	20	.355
Delaware	6	–	14	.300	10	–	21	.323
† 2026 CUSA tournament winner

2025–26 Horizon League men's basketball standings
	Conf.				Overall
Team	W		L	PCT	W		L	PCT
Wright State †	15	–	5	.750	23	–	12	.657
Robert Morris	13	–	7	.650	22	–	11	.667
Detroit Mercy	12	–	8	.600	17	–	15	.531
Oakland	12	–	8	.600	16	–	16	.500
Green Bay	12	–	8	.600	18	–	15	.545
Purdue Fort Wayne	11	–	9	.550	17	–	15	.531
Northern Kentucky	10	–	10	.500	20	–	14	.588
Milwaukee	8	–	12	.400	12	–	20	.375
Youngstown State	8	–	12	.400	15	–	17	.469
Cleveland State	6	–	14	.300	11	–	22	.333
IU Indy	3	–	17	.150	7	–	25	.219
† 2026 Horizon League tournament winner

2025–26 Ivy League men's basketball standings
	Conf.				Overall
Team	W		L	PCT	W		L	PCT
Yale	11	–	3	.786	24	–	7	.774
Harvard	10	–	4	.714	17	–	12	.586
Penn †	9	–	5	.643	18	–	12	.600
Cornell	8	–	6	.571	15	–	13	.536
Columbia	5	–	9	.357	16	–	12	.571
Dartmouth	5	–	9	.357	11	–	16	.407
Princeton	5	–	9	.357	9	–	20	.310
Brown	3	–	11	.214	9	–	18	.333
† 2026 Ivy League tournament winner

2025–26 MAAC men's basketball standings
	Conf.				Overall
Team	W		L	PCT	W		L	PCT
Merrimack	17	–	3	.850	23	–	11	.676
Saint Peter's	14	–	6	.700	17	–	12	.586
Siena †	13	–	7	.650	23	–	12	.657
Quinnipiac	12	–	8	.600	19	–	13	.594
Marist	12	–	8	.600	19	–	12	.613
Mount St. Mary's	11	–	9	.550	15	–	17	.469
Fairfield	11	–	9	.550	21	–	13	.618
Iona	10	–	10	.500	18	–	14	.563
Sacred Heart	9	–	11	.450	14	–	19	.424
Manhattan	8	–	12	.400	12	–	20	.375
Niagara	5	–	15	.250	8	–	22	.267
Canisius	5	–	15	.250	10	–	21	.323
Rider	3	–	17	.150	4	–	25	.138
† 2026 MAAC tournament winner

2025–26 Mid-American Conference men's basketball standings
	Conf.				Overall
Team	W		L	PCT	W		L	PCT
Miami (OH)	18	–	0	1.000	32	–	2	.941
Akron †	17	–	1	.944	29	–	6	.829
Kent State	14	–	4	.778	24	–	10	.706
Toledo	11	–	7	.611	19	–	15	.559
Bowling Green	9	–	9	.500	18	–	14	.563
Ohio	9	–	9	.500	15	–	17	.469
Buffalo	7	–	11	.389	17	–	15	.531
UMass	7	–	11	.389	17	–	16	.515
Ball State	7	–	11	.389	12	–	19	.387
Central Michigan	6	–	12	.333	10	–	21	.323
Western Michigan	4	–	14	.222	10	–	21	.323
Northern Illinois	4	–	14	.222	9	–	21	.300
Eastern Michigan	4	–	14	.222	10	–	21	.323
† 2026 MAC tournament winner

2025–26 MEAC men's basketball standings
	Conf.				Overall
Team	W		L	PCT	W		L	PCT
Howard †	11	–	3	.786	24	–	11	.686
Morgan State	10	–	4	.714	14	–	16	.467
North Carolina Central	8	–	6	.571	14	–	18	.438
Norfolk State	8	–	6	.571	15	–	17	.469
South Carolina State	7	–	7	.500	10	–	22	.313
Maryland Eastern Shore	5	–	9	.357	9	–	23	.281
Coppin State*	5	–	9	.357	7	–	24	.226
Delaware State	2	–	12	.143	8	–	23	.258
† 2026 MEAC tournament winner * Ineligible for both the 2026 NCAA Tournament and MEAC tournament due to APR penalties.

2025–26 Missouri Valley Conference men's basketball standings
	Conf.				Overall
Team	W		L	PCT	W		L	PCT
Belmont	16	–	4	.800	26	–	6	.813
Bradley	13	–	7	.650	21	–	13	.618
Illinois State	12	–	8	.600	23	–	13	.639
Murray State	12	–	8	.600	20	–	13	.606
UIC	12	–	8	.600	19	–	16	.543
Northern Iowa †	11	–	9	.550	23	–	13	.639
Valparaiso	11	–	9	.550	18	–	15	.545
Southern Illinois	10	–	10	.500	16	–	16	.500
Drake	6	–	14	.300	14	–	20	.412
Indiana State	4	–	16	.200	11	–	21	.344
Evansville	3	–	17	.150	7	–	25	.219
† 2026 MVC tournament winner

2025–26 Mountain West Conference men's basketball standings
	Conf.				Overall
Team	W		L	PCT	W		L	PCT
Utah State †	15	–	5	.750	29	–	7	.806
San Diego State	14	–	6	.700	22	–	11	.667
New Mexico	13	–	7	.650	26	–	11	.703
Grand Canyon	13	–	7	.650	20	–	12	.625
Nevada	12	–	8	.600	24	–	13	.649
Boise State	12	–	8	.600	20	–	12	.625
Colorado State	11	–	9	.550	21	–	13	.618
UNLV	11	–	9	.550	18	–	17	.514
Wyoming	9	–	11	.450	18	–	15	.545
Fresno State	7	–	13	.350	13	–	19	.406
San Jose State	3	–	17	.150	9	–	24	.273
Air Force	0	–	20	.000	3	–	29	.094
† 2026 Mountain West tournament winner

2025–26 NEC men's basketball standings
	Conf.				Overall
Team	W		L	PCT	W		L	PCT
LIU †	15	–	3	.833	24	–	11	.686
Central Connecticut	12	–	6	.667	18	–	12	.600
Mercyhurst *	10	–	8	.556	17	–	17	.500
Le Moyne *	10	–	8	.556	15	–	17	.469
New Haven **	9	–	9	.500	14	–	17	.452
Stonehill	8	–	10	.444	12	–	21	.364
Fairleigh Dickinson	8	–	10	.444	11	–	21	.344
Wagner	8	–	10	.444	14	–	17	.452
Chicago State	5	–	13	.278	7	–	25	.219
Saint Francis	5	–	13	.278	7	–	24	.226
† 2026 NEC tournament winner * ineligible for the 2026 NCAA tournament due to transition from Division II ** ineligible for both the 2026 NEC tournament and the 2026 NCAA tournament due to transition from Division II

2025–26 Ohio Valley Conference men's basketball standings
	Conf.				Overall
Team	W		L	PCT	W		L	PCT
Tennessee State †	15	–	5	.750	23	–	10	.697
Morehead State	15	–	5	.750	20	–	13	.606
Southeast Missouri State	14	–	6	.700	20	–	13	.606
UT Martin	13	–	7	.650	22	–	11	.667
SIU Edwardsville	12	–	8	.600	19	–	13	.594
Lindenwood	11	–	9	.550	18	–	15	.545
Little Rock	9	–	11	.450	12	–	20	.375
Eastern Illinois	8	–	12	.400	13	–	20	.394
Tennessee Tech	8	–	12	.400	13	–	18	.419
Southern Indiana	4	–	16	.200	7	–	23	.233
Western Illinois	1	–	19	.050	5	–	26	.161
† 2026 OVC tournament winner

2025–26 Patriot League men's basketball standings
	Conf.				Overall
Team	W		L	PCT	W		L	PCT
Navy	17	–	1	.944	26	–	8	.765
Lehigh †	11	–	7	.611	18	–	17	.514
Colgate	11	–	7	.611	18	–	15	.545
Boston University	10	–	8	.556	17	–	17	.500
American	9	–	9	.500	16	–	16	.500
Loyola	8	–	10	.444	12	–	20	.375
Lafayette	8	–	10	.444	11	–	21	.344
Bucknell	6	–	12	.333	10	–	23	.303
Army	5	–	13	.278	11	–	21	.344
Holy Cross	5	–	13	.278	11	–	22	.333
† 2026 Patriot League tournament winner

2025–26 Southeastern Conference men's basketball standings
	Conf.				Overall
Team	W		L	PCT	W		L	PCT
No. 9 Florida	16	–	2	.889	27	–	8	.771
No. 16 Alabama	13	–	5	.722	25	–	10	.714
No. 13 Arkansas †	13	–	5	.722	28	–	9	.757
No. 19 Vanderbilt	11	–	7	.611	27	–	9	.750
No. 12 Tennessee	11	–	7	.611	25	–	12	.676
Texas A&M	11	–	7	.611	22	–	12	.647
Georgia	10	–	8	.556	22	–	11	.667
Missouri	10	–	8	.556	20	–	13	.606
Kentucky	10	–	8	.556	22	–	14	.611
No. 22 Texas	9	–	9	.500	21	–	15	.583
Oklahoma	7	–	11	.389	21	–	16	.568
Auburn	7	–	11	.389	22	–	16	.579
Mississippi State	5	–	13	.278	13	–	19	.406
South Carolina	4	–	14	.222	13	–	19	.406
Ole Miss	4	–	14	.222	15	–	20	.429
LSU	3	–	15	.167	15	–	17	.469
† 2026 SEC tournament winner Rankings from AP poll

2025–26 Southern Conference men's basketball standings
	Conf.				Overall
Team	W		L	PCT	W		L	PCT
East Tennessee State	13	–	5	.722	23	–	11	.676
Wofford	11	–	7	.611	19	–	13	.594
Samford	11	–	7	.611	18	–	14	.563
Mercer	11	–	7	.611	19	–	13	.594
Western Carolina	10	–	8	.556	15	–	16	.484
Furman †	10	–	8	.556	22	–	13	.629
UNC Greensboro	9	–	9	.500	15	–	19	.441
Chattanooga	7	–	11	.389	13	–	19	.406
The Citadel	7	–	11	.389	11	–	22	.333
VMI	1	–	17	.056	6	–	26	.188
† 2026 SoCon tournament winner

2025–26 Southland Conference men's basketball standings
	Conf.				Overall
Team	W		L	PCT	W		L	PCT
Stephen F. Austin	20	–	2	.909	28	–	6	.824
McNeese †	19	–	3	.864	28	–	6	.824
UT Rio Grande Valley	14	–	8	.636	19	–	14	.576
Texas A&M–Corpus Christi	13	–	9	.591	18	–	15	.545
New Orleans	12	–	10	.545	15	–	18	.455
Nicholls	12	–	10	.545	14	–	19	.424
Northwestern State	8	–	14	.364	10	–	22	.313
Houston Christian	8	–	14	.364	12	–	20	.375
Incarnate Word	7	–	15	.318	12	–	19	.387
Lamar	7	–	15	.318	12	–	19	.387
East Texas A&M	6	–	16	.273	11	–	21	.344
Southeastern Louisiana	6	–	16	.273	9	–	22	.290
† 2026 Southland tournament winner

2025–26 SWAC men's basketball standings
	Conf.				Overall
Team	W		L	PCT	W		L	PCT
Bethune–Cookman	14	–	4	.778	17	–	15	.531
Florida A&M	11	–	7	.611	15	–	16	.484
Southern	11	–	7	.611	17	–	17	.500
Texas Southern	10	–	8	.556	12	–	18	.400
Alabama A&M	10	–	8	.556	18	–	15	.545
Arkansas–Pine Bluff	10	–	8	.556	13	–	19	.406
Jackson State	10	–	8	.556	12	–	21	.364
Prairie View A&M †	9	–	9	.500	19	–	18	.514
Grambling State	7	–	11	.389	14	–	19	.424
Alabama State	7	–	11	.389	10	–	22	.313
Alcorn State	7	–	11	.389	9	–	23	.281
Mississippi Valley State	2	–	16	.111	3	–	30	.091
† 2026 SWAC tournament winner

2025–26 Summit League men's basketball standings
	Conf.				Overall
Team	W		L	PCT	W		L	PCT
North Dakota State †	14	–	2	.875	27	–	8	.771
St. Thomas	12	–	4	.750	24	–	10	.706
North Dakota	10	–	6	.625	18	–	17	.514
South Dakota	8	–	8	.500	16	–	16	.500
Omaha	8	–	8	.500	16	–	17	.485
Denver	8	–	8	.500	15	–	17	.469
South Dakota State	7	–	9	.438	14	–	18	.438
Oral Roberts	4	–	12	.250	10	–	23	.303
Kansas City	1	–	15	.063	4	–	27	.129
† 2026 Summit League tournament winner

2025–26 Sun Belt Conference men's basketball standings
	Conf.				Overall
Team	W		L	PCT	W		L	PCT
Troy †	12	–	6	.667	22	–	12	.647
Marshall	11	–	7	.611	19	–	13	.594
Coastal Carolina	11	–	7	.611	19	–	13	.594
Appalachian State	11	–	7	.611	19	–	13	.594
Texas State	11	–	7	.611	19	–	13	.594
South Alabama	11	–	7	.611	21	–	12	.636
Arkansas State	11	–	7	.611	20	–	12	.625
Southern Miss	9	–	9	.500	19	–	16	.543
James Madison	9	–	9	.500	18	–	15	.545
Georgia Southern	8	–	10	.444	21	–	16	.568
Old Dominion	7	–	11	.389	12	–	21	.364
Louisiana	7	–	11	.389	11	–	22	.333
Georgia State	7	–	11	.389	10	–	22	.313
Louisiana–Monroe	1	–	17	.056	4	–	28	.125
† 2026 Sun Belt tournament winner

2025–26 WAC men's basketball standings
	Conf.				Overall
Team	W		L	PCT	W		L	PCT
Utah Valley	14	–	4	.778	25	–	9	.735
California Baptist †	13	–	5	.722	25	–	9	.735
Utah Tech	11	–	7	.611	19	–	15	.559
UT Arlington	9	–	9	.500	18	–	14	.563
Southern Utah	6	–	12	.333	10	–	22	.313
Abilene Christian	5	–	13	.278	14	–	19	.424
Tarleton	5	–	13	.278	14	–	18	.438
† 2026 WAC tournament winner

2025–26 West Coast Conference men's basketball standings
	Conf.				Overall
Team	W		L	PCT	W		L	PCT
No. 18 Gonzaga †	16	–	2	.889	31	–	4	.886
Saint Mary's	16	–	2	.889	27	–	6	.818
Santa Clara	15	–	3	.833	26	–	9	.743
Oregon State	9	–	9	.500	17	–	16	.515
San Francisco	8	–	10	.444	17	–	16	.515
Pacific	8	–	10	.444	18	–	15	.545
Seattle	8	–	10	.444	21	–	14	.600
Washington State	7	–	11	.389	12	–	20	.375
Portland	6	–	12	.333	15	–	19	.441
Loyola Marymount	6	–	12	.333	15	–	17	.469
San Diego	5	–	13	.278	12	–	21	.364
Pepperdine	4	–	14	.222	9	–	23	.281
† 2026 WCC tournament winner Rankings from AP poll

== Postseason tournaments ==
The NCAA tournament tipped off on March 17, 2026, with the First Four in Dayton, Ohio, and concluded on April 6 at Lucas Oil Stadium in Indianapolis, Indiana. A total of 68 teams entered the tournament. 31 of the teams earned automatic bids by winning their respective conferences tournaments. The remaining 37 teams were granted "at-large" bids, which were extended by the NCAA Selection Committee.

=== Final Four - Lucas Oil Stadium in Indianapolis, Indiana ===
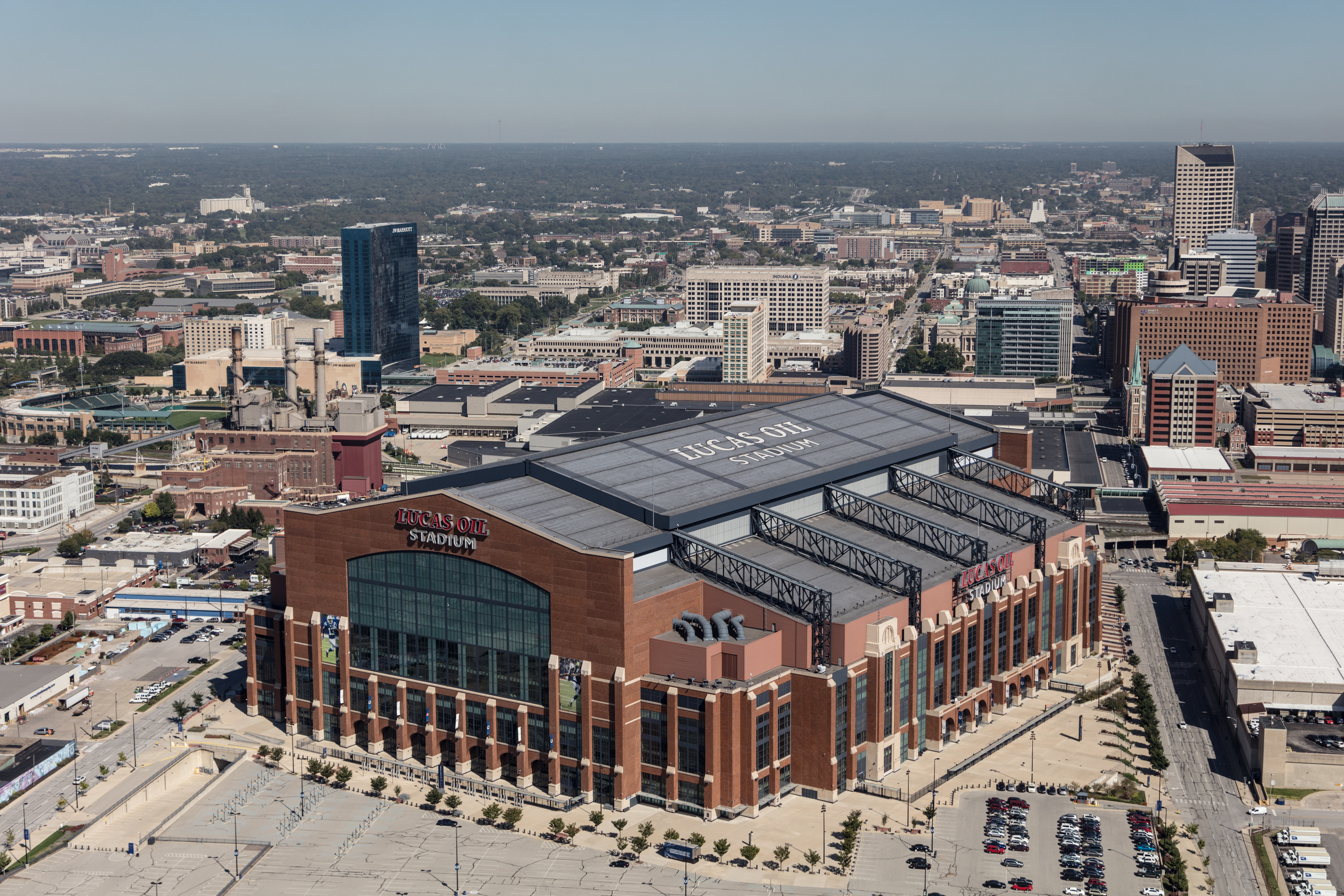
Lucas Oil Stadium in Indianapolis, Indiana, will host the NCAA men's Final Four.

National Semifinals; April 4 Lucas Oil Stadium
E2	UConn	71
S3	Illinois	62
W1	Arizona	73
MW1	Michigan	91

National Championship; April 6 Lucas Oil Stadium
E2	UConn	63
MW1	Michigan	69

=== Tournament upsets ===
Per the NCAA, an upset occurs when the losing team in an NCAA tournament game was seeded at least two seed lines better than the winning team.

Upsets in the 2026 NCAA Division I men's basketball tournament
Round	West Regional	Midwest Regional	South Regional	East Regional
Round of 64	No. 12 High Point defeated No. 5 Wisconsin, 83–82; No. 11 Texas defeated No. 6 BYU, 79–71	None	No. 11 VCU defeated No. 6 North Carolina, 82–78^{OT} No. 10 Texas A&M defeated No. 7 Saint Mary's, 63–50	None
Round of 32	No. 11 Texas defeated No. 3 Gonzaga, 74–68	No. 6 Tennessee defeated No. 3 Virginia, 79–72	No. 9 Iowa defeated No. 1 Florida, 73–72	None
Sweet 16	None	No. 6 Tennessee defeated No. 2 Iowa State, 76–62	No. 9 Iowa defeated No. 4 Nebraska, 77–71	None
Elite 8	None			
Final 4	None			
National Championship	None			

=== National Invitation Tournament ===
Once the NCAA tournament field is announced, the National Invitation Tournament will invite 32 teams to participate. The first three rounds will be played at campus sites, with the semifinals taking place at Hinkle Fieldhouse and the final taking place at Gainbridge Fieldhouse, both in Indianapolis.

=== Semifinals and Final ===
Semifinal; April 2 Hinkle Fieldhouse
1	Auburn	88
4	Illinois State	66
1	New Mexico	69
1	Tulsa	74

Final; April 5 Gainbridge Fieldhouse
1	Auburn	92
1	Tulsa	86 OT

=== College Basketball Crown ===
Once the NCAA tournament field is announced, the College Basketball Crown tournament will invite 8 teams to participate in the event, the Big Ten, Big XII and Big East conferences will receive 2 bids each, the other 2 will be given at-large. The Crown will be held at various venues on the Las Vegas Strip in Paradise, Nevada the week before and during the Final Four.

==== Semifinals and finals ====
Semifinals; April 4 T-Mobile Arena
Oklahoma	82
Baylor	69
West Virginia	87
Creighton	70

Final; April 5 T-Mobile Arena
Oklahoma	82
West Virginia	89*

* denotes overtime period

== Award winners ==
=== 2026 Consensus All-Americans ===
Consensus First Team
Player	Position	Class	Team
Darius Acuff Jr.	PG	Freshman	Arkansas
Cameron Boozer	PF	Freshman	Duke
AJ Dybantsa	SF	Freshman	BYU
Yaxel Lendeborg	SF/PF	Senior	Michigan
Braden Smith	PG	Senior	Purdue

Consensus Second Team
Player	Position	Class	Team
Kingston Flemings	PG	Freshman	Houston
Thomas Haugh	PF	Junior	Florida
Joshua Jefferson	SF/PF	Senior	Iowa State
JT Toppin	PF	Senior	Texas Tech
Keaton Wagler	SG	Freshman	Illinois
Caleb Wilson	PF	Freshman	North Carolina

=== Major player of the year awards ===
- Wooden Award: Cameron Boozer, Duke
- Naismith Award: Cameron Boozer, Duke
- Associated Press Player of the Year: Cameron Boozer, Duke
- NABC Player of the Year: Cameron Boozer, Duke
- Oscar Robertson Trophy (USBWA): Cameron Boozer, Duke
- The Sporting News Player of the Year: Cameron Boozer, Duke

=== Major freshman of the year awards ===
- Wayman Tisdale Award (USBWA): Cameron Boozer, Duke
- NABC Freshman of the Year: Cameron Boozer, Duke

=== Major coach of the year awards ===
- Associated Press Coach of the Year: Fred Hoiberg, Nebraska
- Henry Iba Award (USBWA): Dusty May, Michigan
- NABC Coach of the Year: Jon Scheyer, Duke
- Naismith College Coach of the Year: Tommy Lloyd, Arizona
- The Sporting News Coach of the Year: Tommy Lloyd, Arizona

=== Other major awards ===
- Naismith Starting Five:
  - Bob Cousy Award (best point guard): Darius Acuff Jr., Arkansas
  - Jerry West Award (best shooting guard): Keaton Wagler, Illinois
  - Julius Erving Award (best small forward): AJ Dybantsa, BYU
  - Karl Malone Award (best power forward): Cameron Boozer, Duke
  - Kareem Abdul-Jabbar Award (best center): Zuby Ejiofor, St. John's
- Pete Newell Big Man Award (best big man): Cameron Boozer, Duke
- NABC Defensive Player of the Year: Rueben Chinyelu, Florida
- Naismith Defensive Player of the Year: Rueben Chinyelu, Florida
- Lute Olson Award: Cameron Boozer, Duke
- Robert V. Geasey Trophy (top player in Philadelphia Big 5): Derek Simpson, Saint Joseph's
- Haggerty Award (top player in NYC metro area): Zuby Ejiofor, St. John's
- Ben Jobe Award (top minority coach): Antoine Pettway, Kennesaw State
- Hugh Durham Award (top mid-major coach): Jon Perry, Navy
- Jim Phelan Award (top head coach): Johnny Dawkins, UCF
- Lefty Driesell Award (top defensive player): Maliq Brown, Duke
- Lou Henson Award (top mid-major player): Austin Benigni, Navy
- Skip Prosser Man of the Year Award (coach with moral character): Chris Holtmann, DePaul
- Academic All-American of the Year (top scholar-athlete): Tamin Lipsey, Iowa State
- Elite Scholar-Athlete Award (top GPA among upperclass players at Final Four): AJ Redd, Illinois

== Coaching changes ==
Many teams will change coaches during the season and after it ends.

Team	Former	Interim	New	Reason
Air Force	Joe Scott	Jon Jordan	Joe Crispin	Scott, who was in his sixth season of his second stint as Air Force head coach, and the academy mutually agreed to part ways on February 20, 2026. He had been on indefinite suspension since January 17 among an investigation into treatment of athletes. Falcons assistant coach Jordan, who was serving as the interim head coach during Scott's suspension, would continue in that role for the remainder of the season. On March 18, the Academy hired Penn State assistant Crispin for the job.
Akron	John Groce	—N/a	Dustin Ford	Groce left Akron on March 30, 2026, after nine seasons for the Charleston head coaching job. Zips associate head coach Ford was promoted to the open position that same day.
Alabama State	Tony Madlock	—N/a	Chris Wright	Madlock resigned on March 29, 2026, after four seasons and a 51–80 record at Alabama State. Wright, head coach at NAIA Langston University the last four years, was hired by the Hornets on April 10.
Arizona State	Bobby Hurley	—N/a	Randy Bennett	Following their loss to Iowa State in the second round of the Big 12 tournament, ASU announced on March 11, 2026, that Hurley's contract will not be renewed after 11 seasons, in which the Sun Devils went 185–167 with 3 NCAA tournament appearances. Longtime Saint Mary's head coach Randy Bennett was hired on March 23.
Auburn	Bruce Pearl	—N/a	Steven Pearl	Bruce Pearl announced on September 22, 2025 that he was stepping down from his head coaching role after 11 seasons at Auburn and would remain with the university as an ambassador to the athletic department and serve as special assistant to the athletic director. The elder Pearl led the Tigers to 246 wins, the most as head coach of the program, and made two Final Fours. His son and associate head coach Steven was named as his replacement the same day.
Ball State	Michael Lewis	—N/a	Chris Capko	Ball State fired Lewis on March 7, 2026 after four seasons and a 61–64 record. On March 19, the Cardinals hired SMU Associate Head Coach Chris Capko.
Belmont	Casey Alexander	—N/a	Evan Bradds	Alexander left Belmont on March 13, 2026, after seven seasons for the Kansas State opening. Duke assistant coach and former Bruin star player Bradds was hired on March 19, and was formally introduced at the conclusion of the Blue Devils' season.
Boston College	Earl Grant	—N/a	Luke Murray	Grant was fired on March 8, 2026 after a 72–92 record in five seasons at BC. UConn assistant coach Luke Murray, the son of actor Bill Murray, was hired by the Eagles on March 26, and was formally introduced at the end of the Huskies' season.
Brown	Mike Martin	—N/a	Eric Reveno	Martin left Brown on July 13, 2026, after 13 seasons for an assistant coaching position at Michigan. Stanford associate head coach Reveno was hired by the Bears on July 24.
Butler	Thad Matta	—N/a	Ronald Nored	Matta announced his retirement from coaching on March 16, 2026, after five years at Butler across two stints as coach. He will remain with the program as special assistant to the president and AD. Butler hired Atlanta Hawks assistant Nored, who played on the Bulldogs' back-to-back Final Four teams in 2010 and 2011, on March 25. Nored had also previously served as head coach of the NBA G League's Long Island Nets from 2016 to 2018.
Cal State Bakersfield	Rod Barnes	Mike Scott	Todd Lee	Barnes announced he was stepping away from CSUB on September 24, 2025 after 14 seasons. He led the Roadrunners to a 210–231 record during his tenure, including the Roadrunners' only March Madness appearance in 2016. Assistant coach Scott was named interim head coach for the 2025–26 season. After the season, USC assistant coach Lee, who previously served as head coach of South Dakota from 2018–2022 and was an assistant with CSUB in the mid 1990s, was hired as the permanent replacement on March 26, 2026.
California Baptist	Rick Croy	—N/a	Kyle Getter	Croy left Cal Baptist on March 29, 2026, after 13 seasons to take the associate head coaching position at Arizona State. Notre Dame associate head coach Getter was hired by the Lancers on April 6.
Campbell	John Andrzejek	—N/a	Jimmie Williams	Anderzejek left Campbell after one season on April 1, 2026, to become associate head coach at Louisville. A week later, Division II Anderson (SC) head coach Jimmie Williams was hired by the Fighting Camels.
Charleston	Chris Mack	—N/a	John Groce	Mack left Charleston on March 25, 2026, after two seasons for the South Florida opening. Akron head coach Groce was hired by the Cougars on March 30.
Charlotte	Aaron Fearne	—N/a	Wes Miller	Charlotte fired Fearne on March 17, 2026, after three seasons and a 47–51 record. Former Cincinnati head coach Wes Miller was hired by the 49ers on March 23.
Cincinnati	Wes Miller	—N/a	Jerrod Calhoun	Cincinnati announced on March 19, 2026, that Miller would not return next season. He finished his Cincinnati tenure with an 100–74 record and zero NCAA tournament appearances in five seasons. On March 24, the Bearcats hired Utah State head coach and Cincinnati alum Jerrod Calhoun.
Creighton	Greg McDermott	—N/a	Alan Huss	McDermott announced he will retire at the end of the season on March 23, 2026, after 15 seasons at Creighton and will be succeeded by Bluejays associate head coach Huss. McDermott finished as the program's winningest head coach with 366 wins, and led the team to 10 NCAA tournaments.
Dartmouth	David McLaughlin	—N/a	Brett MacConnell	Dartmouth announced on March 10, 2026, that McLaughlin's contract will not be renewed after nine seasons and an 87–161 record. Stanford assistant coach MacConnell was named the new head coach of the Big Green on March 30.
Eastern Michigan	Stan Heath	—N/a	Billy Donlon	Heath and EMU mutually agreed to part ways on March 8, 2026 after five seasons, in which the Eagles were 57–99 under Heath. Clemson associate head coach Donlon, previously head coach at Wright State and Kansas City, was hired by the Eagles on March 17.
FIU	Jeremy Ballard	—N/a	Joey Cantens	Ballard was dismissed from FIU on March 11, 2026, after a 113–141 record in eight seasons. Joey Cantens, who was head coach at NJCAA Daytona State the past five seasons, was hired by the Panthers on March 20.
Georgia State	Jonas Hayes	—N/a	Jon Cremins	Georgia State dismissed Hayes on March 13, 2026, after four seasons and a 48–78 record. Vanderbilt assistant coach and Atlanta Native Cremins was hired by the Panthers on April 3.
Georgia Tech	Damon Stoudamire	—N/a	Scott Cross	A 42–55 record in three seasons, which was culminated by a 12-game losing streak to end this season, led to Georgia Tech firing Stoudamire on March 8, 2026. Troy head coach Cross was hired by the Yellow Jackets on March 20.
Jackson State	Mo Williams	—N/a	Trey Johnson	Williams left Jackson State on March 30, 2026, after four seasons to join the coaching staff at Kentucky. Tigers associate head coach Johnson, who was named interim head coach after Williams' departure, was officially announced as the new head coach on April 15.
Kansas City	Marvin Menzies	—N/a	Mark Turgeon	Kansas City announced on January 12, 2026 that Menzies, in his fourth season as head coach, would not return following the end of the season. On February 1, the Roos announced the hiring of Mark Turgeon, most recently head coach at Maryland until 2021.
Kansas State	Jerome Tang	Matthew Driscoll	Casey Alexander	Kansas State fired Tang on February 15, 2026 after 3 ½ seasons and a 71–57 record. His termination came 5 days after a post-game rant following a 91–62 loss at home against Cincinnati. Wildcats associate head coach Driscoll was named interim head coach for the remainder of the season. On March 13, Belmont head coach Casey Alexander was announced as the 27th head coach for Kansas State.
Lamar	Alvin Brooks	—N/a	Jordan Fee	Lamar fired Brooks on March 3, 2026 after five seasons and a 62–95 record. Florida Atlantic associate head coach Fee was hired by the Cardinals on March 14.
Little Rock	Darrell Walker	—N/a	Travis Ford	Little Rock parted ways with Walker on March 6, 2026 after a 113–133 record in eight seasons. Travis Ford, most recently head coach at Saint Louis, was hired by the Trojans on March 26.
Louisiana-Monroe	Phil Cunningham	—N/a	Ryan Cross	ULM parted ways with Cunningham on March 9, 2026, after a 4–28 record in his lone season as head coach. UAB associate head coach Cross, a former Warhawk assistant from 2012–2020, was hired on March 25.
LSU	Matt McMahon	—N/a	Will Wade	LSU parted ways with McMahon on March 26, 2026. During his four-year tenure, the Tigers were 60–70, and never made an NCAA Tournament appearance. The same day they replaced him with NC State head coach Will Wade, who coached the Tigers from 2017–2022.
Michigan	Dusty May	Mike Boynton		On June 23, 2026, May agreed to become the head coach of the NBA's Dallas Mavericks. He leaves Michigan after two seasons, going 64–13, and leading the team to winning the 2026 NCAA Division I men's basketball tournament. Wolverines assistant coach Boynton, who was previously head coach at Oklahoma State from 2017–2024, was initially named interim head coach for the 2026–27 season. On July 10, the school announced that Boynton had agreed to a two-year contract to officially be named head coach.
Mississippi Valley State	George Ivory	—N/a	Mike Davis	MVSU parted ways with Ivory after a 12–115 record in four seasons on March 31, 2026. Mike Davis, who previously was head coach at Indiana, UAB, Texas Southern, and most recently Detroit Mercy, was hired by the Delta Devils on April 29.
NC State	Will Wade	—N/a	Justin Gainey	On March 26, 2026, Wade agreed to return to LSU where he was the coach from 2017–2022. In his lone season at NC State, the Wolfpack were 20–14, and made the NCAA Tournament where they lost to Texas in the First Four. On March 31, the Wolfpack hired Tennessee assistant coach Justin Gainey, who played for NC State from 1996–2000.
Nicholls	Tevon Saddler	—N/a	Darion Brown	Saddler left Nicholls on June 29, 2026, after three seasons to become head coach for the Washington Wizards G League affiliate Capital City Go-Go. Former Colonels assistant coach Darion Brown, who had served as the head coach at NAIA Texas A&M University–Texarkana the last two seasons, was hired the following day.
North Carolina	Hubert Davis	—N/a	Michael Malone	UNC announced on March 24, 2026, that Davis will not return after five seasons. During his tenure, the Tar Heels were 125–54, but had lost in the round of 64 in back-to-back NCAA tournaments, the latter after blowing a 19-point lead to VCU. On April 7, longtime NBA coach Michael Malone, who was working as an analyst for ESPN's NBA coverage, was hired by UNC, making him the first head coach to not have been previously affiliated with the school since Frank McGuire was hired in 1952.
Northern Illinois	Rashon Burno	—N/a	Matt Majkrzak	After a 48–106 record in five seasons, NIU parted ways with Burno on March 7, 2026. On March 17, the Huskies hired Division II Northern Michigan head coach Matt Majkrzak who spent six seasons for the Wildcats and finished with the record of 136-73.
Northern Iowa	Ben Jacobson	—N/a	Kyle Green	After 20 seasons at UNI, Jacobson left on March 30, 2026, for the Utah State position. Iowa State assistant coach Kyle Green, who had 4 previous stints as either assistant coach or associate head coach with the Panthers, was hired on April 1.
Oregon State	Wayne Tinkle	—N/a	Justin Joyner	Oregon State announced on February 26, 2026 that Tinkle would not return next season, ending his 12-year tenure at the school. On March 11, the Beavers announced the hiring of Michigan assistant coach Joyner.
Pepperdine	Ed Schilling	—N/a	Griff Aldrich	After a 22–45 record in two seasons, Pepperdine announced on March 9, 2026, that Schilling will not return. Aldrich, who was serving as the associate head coach at Virginia this season after spending the previous seven seasons as head coach at Longwood, was hired by the Waves on March 26.
Providence	Kim English	—N/a	Bryan Hodgson	Weeks after sources first reported on it, Providence officially announced on March 13, 2026, that English will not return after three seasons and a 48–52 record. South Florida head coach Hodgson was hired by the Friars on March 22.
St. Bonaventure	Mark Schmidt	—N/a	Mike MacDonald	Schmidt announced on March 7, 2026 that he would retire after 19 seasons at St. Bonaventure, effective at the end of the season. Schmidt leaves at the Bonnies' all time winningest coach with 340 wins. On March 31, St. Bonaventure alum and head coach of Division II Daemen for the last 14 years in Mike MacDonald was hired as the new head coach.
Saint Joseph's	Billy Lange	—N/a	Steve Donahue	Lange resigned from Saint Joe's on September 10, 2025 after six seasons to take a front-office position with the New York Knicks. Hawks associate head coach Donahue, who had been hired during the off-season, was elevated to head coach the same day.
Saint Mary's	Randy Bennett	—N/a	Mickey McConnell	Bennett left Saint Mary's on March 23, 2026, after 25 seasons for the Arizona State head coaching job. The Gaels immediately promoted associate head coach McConnell to the open position.
San Diego	Steve Lavin	—N/a	JR Blount	USD announced on February 18, 2026 that Lavin would not return for next season, ending his 4-year tenure with the school, but would coach the team through the end of this season. Iowa State assistant Blount was hired by the Toreros on March 9.
Siena	Gerry McNamara	—N/a	Nevada Smith	McNamara left Siena on March 24, 2026, after two seasons for the head coaching job at his alma mater Syracuse. Marquette assistant coach Smith was hired by the Saints on April 1.
South Florida	Bryan Hodgson	—N/a	Chris Mack	Hodgson left USF after one season on March 22, 2026, for the Providence head coaching job. Charleston head coach Mack was hired by the Bulls three days later.
Syracuse	Adrian Autry	—N/a	Gerry McNamara	Syracuse fired Autry on March 11, 2026, after a 49–48 record in three seasons with no NCAA tournament appearances. Siena head coach Gerry McNamara, a former star player and assistant coach for the Orange, was hired on March 24.
Tarleton	Billy Gillispie	—N/a	Eric Haut	Tarleton announced on February 27, 2026 that Gillispie, who had not coached since January 15 due to medical issues, would not return as head coach next season, ending his 6-year tenure. Utah State associate head coach Haut was hired by the Texans on March 12.
Tennessee Tech	John Pelphrey	—N/a	Tobin Anderson	Tennessee Tech parted ways with Pelphrey on March 3, 2026 after a 79–138 record in seven seasons. On March 13, the Golden Eagles hired former Fairleigh Dickinson and Iona head coach Tobin Anderson, who was on the staff at South Florida this season.
Texas Southern	Johnny Jones	—N/a	Corey Lowery	Jones announced on April 7, 2026, that he was leaving TSU after eight seasons to return to his alma mater LSU as an assistant coach under Will Wade. After a 4-month search, the Tigers hired Seton Hall assistant Lowery as his replacement.
Troy	Scott Cross	—N/a	Adam Howard	Cross left Troy on March 20, 2026, after seven seasons for Georgia Tech. NC State assistant coach Howard, who was an assistant with the Trojans from 2016–2018, was hired on March 29.
UNC Greensboro	Mike Jones	—N/a	Jerod Haase	Jones' contract with UNCG was not renewed on March 9, 2026, ending his tenure with a 93–69 record in five seasons. On March 18, the Spartans hired former UAB and Stanford head coach Haase.
Utah State	Jerrod Calhoun	—N/a	Ben Jacobson	On March 24, 2026, Calhoun left Utah State after two seasons to take the head coaching position at his alma mater Cincinnati. Northern Iowa head coach Ben Jacobson was hired by the Aggies on March 30.
UT Rio Grande Valley	Kahil Fennell	—N/a	Brandon Chambers	On March 21, 2026, Fennell left UTRGV after two seasons to take the Western Michigan head coaching position. NC State assistant coach Chambers was hired by the Vaqueros on April 3.
Wagner	Donald Copeland	Dwan McMillan		On April 20, 2026, Wagner fired Copeland, who had been on suspension since September 2025 for allegations of player abuse. Seahawks assistant coach McMillan, who served as interim head coach this season, was officially named as the new head coach the same day.
Weber State	Eric Duft	—N/a	Kaleb Canales	Weber State announced on March 12, 2026, that after four seasons as head coach, Duft was being reassigned to a new role as the President of Basketball Operations and Development for the men's basketball program. On April 3, the Wildcats hired Troy associate head coach Canales as his replacement.
Western Michigan	Dwayne Stephens	—N/a	Kahil Fennell	WMU fired Stephens on March 8, 2026 after four seasons and a 42–84 record. On March 21, the Broncos hired UTRGV head coach Khail Fennell.
Wofford	Dwight Perry	—N/a	Kevin Giltner	Wofford fired Perry, along with associate head coach Tysor Anderson, on September 12, 2025 following an alleged NCAA violation. Under Perry, the Terriers went 48–43 in his 3-year tenure, capped off with an appearance in the NCAA tournament this past season. Virginia Tech assistant coach Giltner, a former assistant and alum of Wofford, was hired on September 22.

== Attendances ==
The top 30 NCAA Division I men's basketball teams by average home attendance:

== Television viewers and ratings ==
=== Most watched regular season games ===
Rank	Game	Date	Time (ET)	Matchup				Network	Viewers (millions)	TV rating
1	CBS Sports Thanksgiving Classic	November 27	7:00 p.m.	No. 4 Duke	80	No. 22 Arkansas	71	CBS	6.8	
2	Fort Myers Tip-Off Beach Division	November 27	4:30 p.m.	No. 11 Michigan State	74	No. 16 North Carolina	58	FOX	6.5	
3	Rivalry/College GameDay/Capital Showcase	February 21	6:30 p.m.	No. 3 Duke	68	No. 1 Michigan	63	ESPN	4.3	
4	Rivalry/College GameDay	February 7	6:30 p.m.	No. 14 North Carolina	71	No. 4 Duke	68	ESPN	3.5	
5	Rivalry/College GameDay	March 7	6:30 p.m.	No. 1 Duke	76	No. 17 North Carolina	61	ESPN	3.4	
6	Rivalry	March 8	4:30 p.m.	No. 3 Michigan	90	No. 8 Michigan State	80	CBS	2.9	
7		January 10	8:00 p.m.	UCLA	67	Maryland	55	FOX	2.86	
8	Rivalry	January 30	8:00 p.m.	No. 3 Michigan	83	No. 7 Michigan State	71	FOX	2.8	
9		February 21	3:00 p.m.	No. 4 Arizona	73	No. 2 Houston	66	ABC	2.45	
10		January 31	6:30 p.m.	Kentucky	85	No. 15 Arkansas	77	ESPN	2.39	

=== Most watched conference tournament games ===
Rank	Tournament	Date	time (ET)	Matchup				Network	Viewers (millions)	TV rating
1	Big Ten Tournament	March 15	3:30 pm	No. 18 Purdue	80	No. 3 Michigan	72	CBS	4.716	
2	ACC Tournament	March 14	8:30 pm	No. 10 Virginia	70	No. 1 Duke	74	ESPN	4.1	
3	Big 12 Tournament	March 14	6:00 pm	No. 5 Houston	74	No. 2 Arizona	79	ESPN	3.1	
4	SEC Tournament	March 15	1:00 pm	No. 22 Vanderbilt	75	Arkansas	86	ESPN	2.6	
5	Big East Tournament	March 14	6:30 pm	No. 6 UConn	52	No. 13 St John's	72	FOX	1.77	

=== Most watched tournament games ===
(#) Tournament seedings and region in parentheses.

Rank	Round	Date and time (ET)	Matchup			Network	Viewers (millions)	TV rating
1	National Championship Game	April 6, 8:50 p.m.	(1 MW) Michigan	69–62	(2 E) UConn	TNT	18.3	
2	Final Four Semifinals	April 4, 9:19 p.m.	(1 W) Arizona	73–91	(1 MW) Michigan	TBS	14.29	
3	Final Four Semifinals	April 4, 6:09 p.m.	(2 E) UConn	71–62	(3 S) Illinois	TBS	14.16	
4	Elite 8	March 29, 5:15 p.m.	(1 E) Duke	72–73	(2 E) UConn	CBS	13.4	
5	Second Round	March 22, 5:15 p.m.	(4 E) Kansas	65–67	(5 E) St. John's	CBS	10.58	
6	Elite 8	March 28, 5:15 p.m.	(1 W) Arizona	79–64	(2 W) Purdue	TBS	10.1	
7	Second Round	March 22, 2:45 p.m.	(2 MW) Iowa State	82–63	(7 MW) Kentucky	CBS	9.79	
8	Second Round	March 21, 5:15 p.m.	(1 E) Duke	81–58	(9 E) TCU	CBS	9.55	
9	Sweet 16	March 27, 7:10 p.m.	(1 E) Duke	80–75	(5 E) St. John's	CBS	9.37	
10	Second Round	March 21, 2:45 p.m.	(3 E) Michigan State	77–69	(6 E) Louisville	CBS	8.47	

== See also ==
- 2025–26 NCAA Division I women's basketball season
