= 2025–26 Jackson State Tigers basketball team =

American college basketball season

2025–26 Jackson State Tigers basketball
- Conference: Southwestern Athletic Conference
- Record: 12–21 (10–8 SWAC)
- Head coach: Mo Williams (4th season)
- Associate head coach: Trey Johnson
- Assistant coaches: Tyler Adams; Keith Williams; Khalill Spencer; Kydarrius Williams
- Home arena: Williams Assembly Center

2025–26 SWAC men's basketball standings
	Conf.				Overall
Team	W		L	PCT	W		L	PCT
Bethune–Cookman	14	–	4	.778	17	–	15	.531
Florida A&M	11	–	7	.611	15	–	16	.484
Southern	11	–	7	.611	17	–	17	.500
Texas Southern	10	–	8	.556	12	–	18	.400
Alabama A&M	10	–	8	.556	18	–	15	.545
Arkansas–Pine Bluff	10	–	8	.556	13	–	19	.406
Jackson State	10	–	8	.556	12	–	21	.364
Prairie View A&M †	9	–	9	.500	19	–	18	.514
Grambling State	7	–	11	.389	14	–	19	.424
Alabama State	7	–	11	.389	10	–	22	.313
Alcorn State	7	–	11	.389	9	–	23	.281
Mississippi Valley State	2	–	16	.111	3	–	30	.091
† 2026 SWAC tournament winner

The 2025–26 Jackson State Tigers basketball team represented Jackson State University during the 2025–26 NCAA Division I men's basketball season. The Tigers, led by fourth-year head coach Mo Williams, played their home games at the Williams Assembly Center in Jackson, Mississippi, as members of the Southwestern Athletic Conference.

== Previous season ==
The Tigers finished the 2024–25 season 16–18, 14–4 in SWAC play, to finish in second place. They defeated Florida A&M, and Bethune–Cookman, before falling to Alabama State in the SWAC tournament championship game.

== Preseason ==
On October 8, 2025, the SWAC released their preseason polls. Jackson State was picked to finish third in the conference, while receiving one first-place vote.

=== Preseason rankings ===
SWAC Preseason Poll
Place	Team	Votes
1	Bethune–Cookman	232 (12)
2	Southern	214 (5)
3	Jackson State	208 (1)
4	Alabama State	183 (3)
5	Texas Southern	182
6	Alabama A&M	163
7	Grambling State	151
8	Florida A&M	115
9	Prairie View A&M	99
10	Alcorn State	74
11	Arkansas–Pine Bluff	70 (1)
12	Mississippi Valley State	25
(#) first-place votes

=== Preseason Player of the Year ===
Preseason Player of the Year
Player	Year	Position
Daeshun Ruffin	Senior	Guard

=== Preseason All-SWAC Teams ===
Preseason All-SWAC Teams
Team	Player	Year	Position
First	Daeshun Ruffin	Senior	Guard
Second	Dorian McMillian	Sophomore	Guard

== Roster ==
2025–26 Jackson State Tigers men's basketball team
Players
Coaches

Pos.	#	Name	Height	Weight	Year	Previous school	Hometown
G/F	0	Tamarion Hoover	6 ft 4 in (1.93 m)	160 lb (73 kg)	So	Yazoo City High School	Yazoo City, Mississippi
G	1	Dorian McMillian	6 ft 3 in (1.91 m)	169 lb (77 kg)	So	Pascagoula High School	Pascagoula, Mississippi
G	2	Jalen Tatum	6 ft 4 in (1.93 m)	187 lb (85 kg)	RS Jr	Holmes Community College	Pine Bluff, Arkansas
G/F	3	Jayme Mitchell Jr.	6 ft 5 in (1.96 m)	200 lb (91 kg)	RS Jr	Alabama State	Jackson, Mississippi
F	4	Devin Ree	6 ft 9 in (2.06 m)	177 lb (80 kg)	Sr	Louisiana Tech	Jackson, Mississippi
G	5	Keiveon Hunt	6 ft 0 in (1.83 m)	184 lb (83 kg)	Sr	Callaway High School	Jackson, Mississippi
F	7	Kedrick Simmons	6 ft 6 in (1.98 m)	174 lb (79 kg)	Fr	Booneville High School	Booneville, Mississippi
F	8	Dionjahe Thomas	6 ft 8 in (2.03 m)	236 lb (107 kg)	RS Jr	Southern	Houma, Louisiana
F	9	Deyan Kolev	6 ft 9 in (2.06 m)	205 lb (93 kg)	Fr	Pierre de Coubertin Sports School	Yambol, Bulgaria
C	10	Ebo Wilson	6 ft 10 in (2.08 m)	284 lb (129 kg)	So	Ridgeland High School	Accra, Ghana
G	11	Mike Williams	6 ft 2 in (1.88 m)	176 lb (80 kg)	Fr	Germantown High School	Gluckstadt, Mississippi
G	12	Delyle Williams	6 ft 3 in (1.91 m)	191 lb (87 kg)	Jr	St. John Bosco High School	Compton, California
G	13	Cael Jones	6 ft 1 in (1.85 m)	149 lb (68 kg)	Fr	Southaven High School	Southaven, Mississippi
F	20	Raevon Thomas	6 ft 9 in (2.06 m)	217 lb (98 kg)	Sr	Central State	Detroit, Michigan
F	21	Kobe Butler	6 ft 7 in (2.01 m)	201 lb (91 kg)	Fr	Archbishop Shaw High School	Marrero, Louisiana
G	24	Daeshun Ruffin	5 ft 10 in (1.78 m)	157 lb (71 kg)	Sr	Ole Miss	Jackson, Mississippi

Head coach

- Mo Williams (Alabama)

Assistant coach(es)

- Trey Johnson (Jackson State)
- Tyler Adams (Georgetown)
- Keith Williams (Arkansas–Pine Bluff)
- Khalill Spencer (Jackson State)
- Kydarrius Williams (Alabama)

Legend

- (C) Team captain
- (S) Suspended
- (I) Ineligible
- (W) Walk-on
- Injured
- Current redshirt

Roster
Last update: December 17, 2025

== Schedule and results ==
Date time, TV	Rank^{#}	Opponent^{#}	Result	Record	Site (attendance) city, state
Exhibition
October 27, 2025*; 8:00 pm		Southern Miss	L 71–81	–	Williams Assembly Center; Jackson, MS
Non-conference regular season
November 3, 2025*; 7:30 pm, BTN		at No. 17 Illinois	L 55–113	0–1	State Farm Center (14,511); Champaign, IL
November 6, 2025*; 6:00 pm, ACCNX		at No. 11 Louisville	L 70–106	0–2	KFC Yum! Center (14,412); Louisville, KY
November 15, 2025*; 6:00 pm, ESPN+		at Louisiana Tech	L 51–68	0–3	Thomas Assembly Center (2,106); Ruston, LA
November 19, 2025*; 8:00 pm, SECN		at No. 22 Auburn	L 66–112	0–4	Neville Arena (9,121); Auburn, AL
November 21, 2025*; 7:00 pm, SECN+		at No. 21 Arkansas	L 61–115	0–5	Bud Walton Arena (19,200); Fayetteville, AR
November 23, 2025*; 7:00 pm, SWAC TV		Winthrop	L 62–80	0–6	Williams Assembly Center (506); Jackson, MS
November 28, 2025*; 7:00 pm, ESPN+		at Louisiana	W 51–45	1–6	Cajundome (2,704); Lafayette, LA
December 2, 2025*; 6:00 pm, ESPN+		at Kennesaw State	L 73–88	1–7	VyStar Arena (1,378); Kennesaw, GA
December 10, 2025*; 7:00 pm, ESPN+		at No. 7 Houston	L 38–80	1–8	Fertitta Center (7,035); Houston, TX
December 13, 2025*; 1:00 pm, BTN		at Northwestern	L 53–93	1–9	Welsh–Ryan Arena (5,007); Evanston, IL
December 18, 2025*; 4:00 pm, ESPNU		vs. Hampton; Chris Paul HBCU Classic	L 77–84	1–10	Gateway Center Arena (425); College Park, GA
December 19, 2025*; 6:30 pm, ESPNU		vs. Norfolk State; Chris Paul HBCU Classic	L 72–82	1–11	Gateway Center Arena (375); College Park, GA
December 29, 2025*; 7:00 pm, ESPN+		at TCU	L 64–115	1–12	Schollmaier Arena (4,857); Fort Worth, TX
SWAC regular season
January 3, 2026; 3:00 pm, SWAC TV		Alcorn State	W 89–86	2–12 (1–0)	Williams Assembly Center (2,220); Jackson, MS
January 10, 2026; 3:00 pm, ESPNU		at Alabama State	W 75–64	3–12 (2–0)	Dunn–Oliver Acadome (895); Montgomery, AL
January 12, 2026; 7:00 pm, SWAC TV		at Alabama A&M	L 91–100	3–13 (2–1)	AAMU Event Center (2,823); Huntsville, AL
January 17, 2026; 3:00 pm, SWAC TV		Prairie View A&M	W 82-78	4–13 (3–1)	Williams Assembly Center (1,152); Jackson, MS
January 19, 2026; 7:00 pm, SWAC TV		Texas Southern	W 94–89	5–13 (4–1)	Williams Assembly Center (654); Jackson, MS
January 24, 2026; 3:00 pm, ESPNU		at Bethune–Cookman	L 48–85	5–14 (4–2)	Moore Gymnasium (824); Daytona Beach, FL
January 26, 2026; 6:00 p.m., SWAC TV		at Florida A&M	W 66–65	6–14 (5–2)	Al Lawson Center (1,005); Tallahassee, FL
January 31, 2026; 3:00 pm, SWAC TV		Grambling State	L 66–69	6–15 (5–3)	Williams Assembly Center (1,136); Jackson, MS
February 2, 2026; 7:00 pm, SWAC TV		Southern	L 91–96 ^{OT}	6–16 (5–4)	Williams Assembly Center (1,055); Jackson, MS
February 7, 2026; 5:00 pm, SWAC TV		at Mississippi Valley State	W 97–81	7–16 (6–4)	Harrison HPER Complex (573); Itta Bena, MS
February 9, 2026; 5:30 pm, SWAC TV		at Arkansas–Pine Bluff	L 63–84	7–17 (6–5)	H.O. Clemmons Arena (2,046); Pine Bluff, AR
February 14, 2026; 2:30 pm, HBCU GO		Florida A&M	W 80–60	8–17 (7–5)	Williams Assembly Center (945); Jackson, MS
February 16, 2026; 6:00 pm, ESPNU		Bethune–Cookman	W 91–86	9–17 (8–5)	Williams Assembly Center (1,056); Jackson, MS
February 21, 2026; 3:00 pm, SWAC TV		at Alcorn State	L 65–83	9–18 (8–6)	Davey Whitney Complex (1,201); Lorman, MS
February 26, 2026; 8:30 pm, SWAC TV		at Prairie View A&M	L 76–85 ^{OT}	9–19 (8–7)	William Nicks Building (1,526); Prairie View, TX
February 28, 2026; 4:00 pm, SWAC TV		at Texas Southern	L 57–82	9–20 (8–8)	H&PE Arena (1,567); Houston, TX
March 3, 2026; 8:00 pm, SWAC TV		Arkansas–Pine Bluff	W 81–78	10–20 (9–8)	Williams Assembly Center (768); Jackson, MS
March 5, 2026; 8:00 pm, SWAC TV		Mississippi Valley State	W 85–77	11–20 (10–8)	Williams Assembly Center (1,196); Jackson, MS
SWAC tournament
March 10, 2026; 7:30 p.m., ESPN+	(7)	vs. (9) Grambling State; Second round	W 68–65	12–20	Gateway Center Arena (1,024); College Park, GA
March 11, 2026; 7:30 p.m., ESPN+	(7)	vs. (2) Florida A&M; Quarterfinals	L 60–70	12–21	Gateway Center Arena (1,274); College Park, GA
*Non-conference game. ^{#}Rankings from AP Poll. (#) Tournament seedings in parentheses. All times are in Central.
