= Daeshun Ruffin =

American basketball player (born 2003)

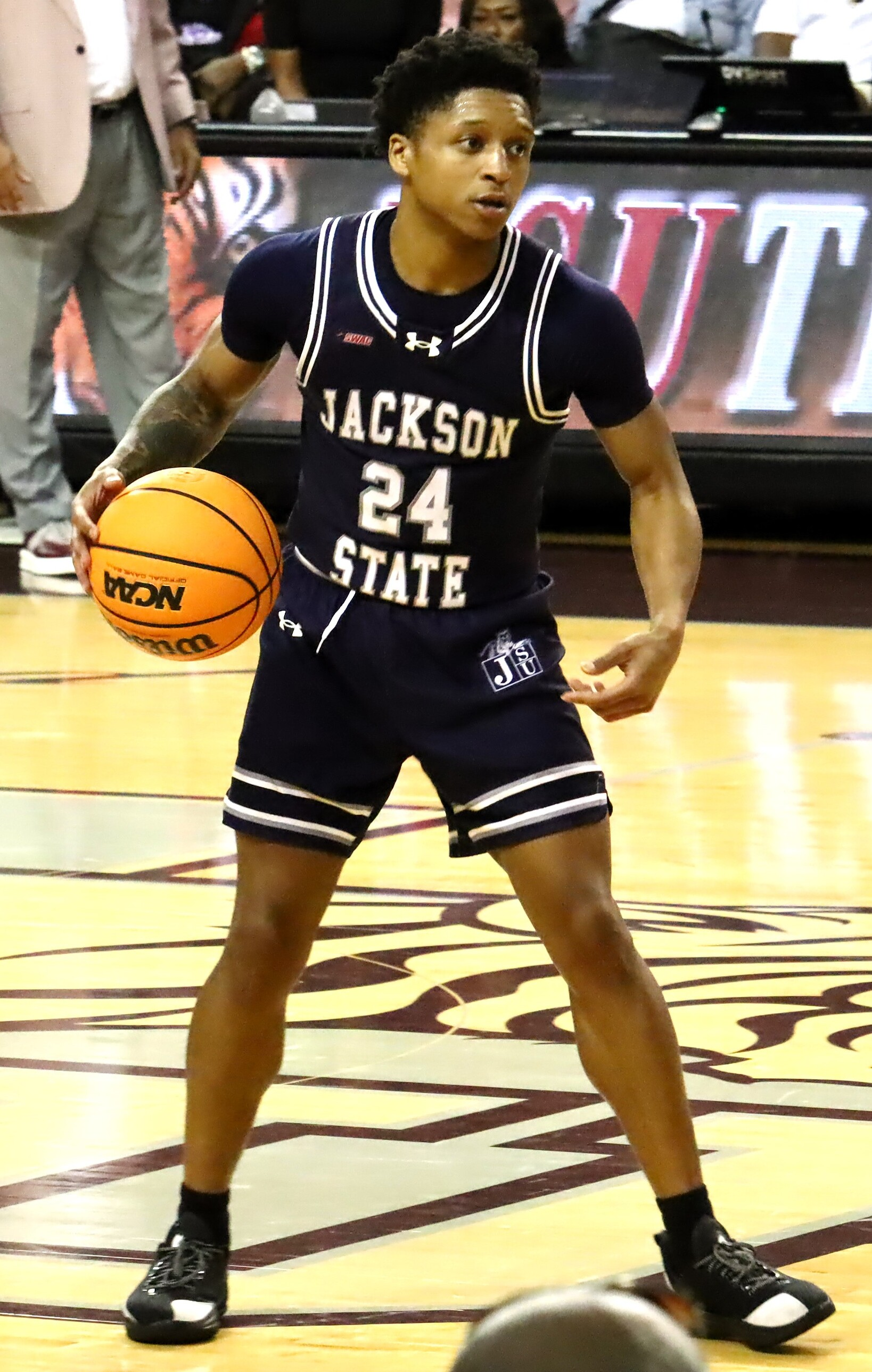

Personal information
- Born: March 19, 2003 (age 23)
- Listed height: 5 ft 10 in (1.78 m)
- Listed weight: 157 lb (71 kg)

Career information
- High school: Callaway (Jackson, Mississippi)
- College: Ole Miss (2021–2023); Jackson State (2024–2026)
- NBA draft: 2026: undrafted
- Position: Point guard

Career highlights
- SWAC Player of the Year (2026); First-team All-SWAC (2026); McDonald's All-American (2021)

Daeshun Ruffin (born March 19, 2003) is an American basketball player. He played college basketball for the Ole Miss Rebels and Jackson State Tigers. He was named the 2026 Southwestern Athletic Conference Player of the Year.

== High school career ==
Ruffin played basketball for Callaway High School in Jackson, Mississippi. In his freshman season, he averaged 19.6 points and 5.8 assists per game, and led his team to the semifinals of the 5A state tournament. In his first game at the tournament, Ruffin scored 42 points, breaking Malik Newman's scoring record. Ruffin averaged 26 points, 4.6 rebounds and three assists per game as a sophomore. He averaged 26.8 points, 4.1 rebounds, 3.4 assists and 2.9 steals per game in his junior season, and won a 5A state title. Ruffin was selected as Mississippi Gatorade Player of the Year. As a senior, he averaged 33.1 points, 3.3 rebounds and 2.8 assists per game, and repeated as Mississippi Gatorade Player of the Year. He was named a McDonald's All-American, and received All-State honors in each year of high school.

=== Recruiting ===
Ruffin was a consensus four-star recruit and one of the top point guards in the 2021 class. He initially committed to Auburn before reopening his recruitment. On June 17, 2020, Ruffin committed to Ole Miss over offers from Auburn, Florida, Mississippi State and LSU, among others. He became the highest-ranked recruit in program history.

College recruiting
Name	Hometown	School	Height	Weight	Commit date
Daeshun Ruffin; PG	Jackson, MS	Callaway (MS)	5 ft 9 in (1.75 m)	160 lb (73 kg)	Jun 17, 2020
Daeshun Ruffin; PG	Recruit ratings: Rivals: 247Sports: ESPN: (86)				
Overall recruit ranking: Rivals: 57 247Sports: 57 ESPN: 40
Note: In many cases, Scout, Rivals, 247Sports, On3, and ESPN may conflict in their listings of height and weight.; In these cases, the average was taken. ESPN grades are on a 100-point scale.; Sources: "Ole Miss 2021 Basketball Commitments". Rivals.; "2021 Ole Miss Rebels Recruiting Class". ESPN.; "2021 Team Ranking". Rivals.

== College career ==
Ruffin suffered a broken hand in his college debut against New Orleans on November 9, 2021. He made his return on December 15 during a 62–52 win over Middle Tennessee State, scoring 12 points in 13 minutes. He recorded a team-high 19 points off the bench in their next game, a 76–68 victory over Dayton. Ruffin scored 19 points during a 76–72 win over LSU on February 1, 2022, but suffered a season-ending knee injury. He averaged 12.6 points, 3.4 assists and a team-high 2.3 steals per game. Ruffin played for Ole Miss during the 2021–22 and 2022–23 seasons before transferring to Jackson State.

== Career statistics ==
Legend
GP	Games played	GS	Games started	MPG	Minutes per game
FG%	Field goal percentage	3P%	3-point field goal percentage	FT%	Free throw percentage
RPG	Rebounds per game	APG	Assists per game	SPG	Steals per game
BPG	Blocks per game	PPG	Points per game	**Bold**	Career high

=== College ===
Year	Team	GP	GS	MPG	FG%	3P%	FT%	RPG	APG	SPG	BPG	PPG
2021–22	Ole Miss	14	10	25.9	.373	.216	.754	1.5	3.4	**2.3**	**.1**	12.6
2022–23	Ole Miss	11	3	18.1	.367	.300	.724	1.1	3.2	.6	**.1**	9.5
2023–24	Jackson State	Redshirt (redshirt)										
2024–25	Jackson State	24	24	31.7	.386	**.327**	**.849**	**3.5**	4.2	1.5	.0	15.7
2025–26	Jackson State	**28**	**28**	**33.6**	**.426**	.309	.843	2.8	**5.3**	1.6	**.1**	**23.3**
**Career**		**77**	**64**	**29.4**	**.401**	**.299**	**.824**	**2.5**	**4.3**	**1.6**	**.1**	**17.0**
