= 2025–26 Southern Jaguars basketball team =

American college basketball season

2025–26 Southern Jaguars basketball
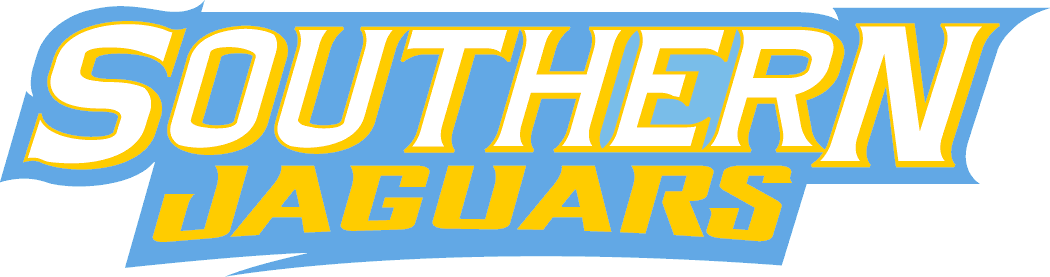
- Conference: Southwestern Athletic Conference
- Record: 17–17 (11–7 SWAC)
- Head coach: Kevin Johnson (3rd season)
- Assistant coaches: Jethro Hillman; Phillip Shumpert; Shembari Phillips; Brennan Dumas
- Home arena: F. G. Clark Center

2025–26 SWAC men's basketball standings
	Conf.				Overall
Team	W		L	PCT	W		L	PCT
Bethune–Cookman	14	–	4	.778	17	–	15	.531
Florida A&M	11	–	7	.611	15	–	16	.484
Southern	11	–	7	.611	17	–	17	.500
Texas Southern	10	–	8	.556	12	–	18	.400
Alabama A&M	10	–	8	.556	18	–	15	.545
Arkansas–Pine Bluff	10	–	8	.556	13	–	19	.406
Jackson State	10	–	8	.556	12	–	21	.364
Prairie View A&M †	9	–	9	.500	18	–	17	.514
Grambling State	7	–	11	.389	14	–	19	.424
Alabama State	7	–	11	.389	10	–	22	.313
Alcorn State	7	–	11	.389	9	–	23	.281
Mississippi Valley State	2	–	16	.111	3	–	30	.091
† 2026 SWAC tournament winner As of March 14, 2026

The 2025–26 Southern Jaguars basketball team represented Southern University during the 2025–26 NCAA Division I men's basketball season. The Jaguars, led by third-year head coach Kevin Johnson, played their home games at the F. G. Clark Center in Baton Rouge, Louisiana as members of the Southwestern Athletic Conference.

== Previous season ==
The Jaguars finished the 2024–25 season 20–12, 15–3 in SWAC play, to finish as SWAC regular season champions. They were upset in overtime by #8 seed Grambling State in the quarterfinals of the SWAC tournament.

== Preseason ==
On October 8, 2025, the SWAC released their preseason polls. Southern was picked to finish second in the conference, while receiving five first-place votes.

=== Preseason rankings ===
SWAC Preseason Poll
Place	Team	Votes
1	Bethune–Cookman	232 (12)
2	Southern	214 (5)
3	Jackson State	208 (1)
4	Alabama State	183 (3)
5	Texas Southern	182
6	Alabama A&M	163
7	Grambling State	151
8	Florida A&M	115
9	Prairie View A&M	99
10	Alcorn State	74
11	Arkansas–Pine Bluff	70 (1)
12	Mississippi Valley State	25
(#) first-place votes

=== Preseason All-SWAC Teams ===
Preseason All-SWAC Team
Team	Player	Year	Position
First	Michael Jacobs	Senior	Guard

== Roster ==
2025–26 Southern Jaguars men's basketball team
Players
Coaches

Pos.	#	Name	Height	Weight	Year	Previous school	Hometown
G	0	Rondae Hill	6 ft 0 in (1.83 m)	175 lb (79 kg)	So	Henderson State	Shreveport, Louisiana
F	1	DaMariee Jones	6 ft 5 in (1.96 m)	185 lb (84 kg)	Sr	Mobile	Bessemer, Alabama
G	2	Joe Manning	6 ft 2 in (1.88 m)	185 lb (84 kg)	Sr	Northwest Florida State College	Bossier City, Louisiana
G	3	Cam Amboree	6 ft 3 in (1.91 m)	180 lb (82 kg)	Sr	Oral Roberts	Pearland, Texas
G	4	Brandon Hardy	6 ft 3 in (1.91 m)	205 lb (93 kg)	Jr	Louisiana	Zachary, Louisiana
G	5	Jayce Depron	6 ft 3 in (1.91 m)	175 lb (79 kg)	So	Madison Prep Academy	White Castle, Louisiana
G	6	Trey Shephard	6 ft 6 in (1.98 m)	170 lb (77 kg)	Fr	Quality Education Academy	Atlanta, Georgia
F	7	Femi Olaniyan	6 ft 5 in (1.96 m)	210 lb (95 kg)	Jr	Clarendon College	Allen, Texas
F	8	Malek Abdelgowad	6 ft 10 in (2.08 m)	220 lb (100 kg)	GS	UMass	Cairo, Egypt
G	9	Andre Nunley	5 ft 10 in (1.78 m)	200 lb (91 kg)	GS	Prairie View A&M	Euless, Texas
G	10	Michael Jacobs	6 ft 2 in (1.88 m)	200 lb (91 kg)	Sr	Lawson State Community College	Atlanta, Georgia
G/F	11	Keith Lamar	6 ft 6 in (1.98 m)	215 lb (98 kg)	GS	Stephen F. Austin	Atlanta, Georgia
F	12	AJ Barnes	6 ft 6 in (1.98 m)	210 lb (95 kg)	Sr	Chipola College	Atlanta, Georgia
F	13	Lionel Bell	6 ft 9 in (2.06 m)	235 lb (107 kg)	RS Fr	Booker T. Washington High School	New Orleans, Louisiana
G	14	Fazl Oshodi	6 ft 3 in (1.91 m)	183 lb (83 kg)	So	Southwest Mississippi Community College	Swedesboro, New Jersey
F	23	Terrance Dixon Jr.	6 ft 8 in (2.03 m)	230 lb (104 kg)	Sr	Lamar	Lawrenceville, Georgia
G/F	24	Ashton Magee	6 ft 7 in (2.01 m)	205 lb (93 kg)	Fr	South Jones High School	Laurel, Mississippi
G/F	35	Puoch "PJ" Dobuol	6 ft 8 in (2.03 m)	195 lb (88 kg)	Sr	LSU Eunice	St. Cloud, Minnesota

Head coach

- Kevin Johnson (Texas–Pan American)

Assistant coach(es)

- Jethro Hillman (Miami (FL))
- Phillip Shumpert (US Sports Academy)
- Shembari Phillips (Georgia Tech)
- Brennan Dumas (Texas)

Legend

- (C) Team captain
- (S) Suspended
- (I) Ineligible
- (W) Walk-on
- Injured
- Current redshirt

Roster
Last update: December 15, 2025

== Schedule and results ==
Date time, TV	Rank^{#}	Opponent^{#}	Result	Record	High points	High rebounds	High assists	Site (attendance) city, state
Non-conference regular season
November 3, 2025*; 6:00 pm, SECN+		at No. 14 Arkansas	L 77–109	0–1	22 – Jacobs	7 – Jones	4 – Jacobs	Bud Walton Arena (19,200); Fayetteville, AR
November 5, 2025*; 7:00 pm, ESPN+		at Marquette	L 82–100	0–2	21 – Jacobs	10 – Tied	3 – Tied	Fiserv Forum (13,002); Milwaukee, WI
November 10, 2025*; 11:00 am		Ecclesia	W 115–51	1–2	19 – Abdelgowad	11 – Jones	12 – Amboree	F. G. Clark Center (2,780); Baton Rouge, LA
November 15, 2025*; 6:30 pm		Champion Christian	W 129−64	2−2	26 – Jacobs	9 – Abdelgowad	6 – Oshodi	F. G. Clark Center (3,256); Baton Rouge, LA
November 18, 2025*; 8:30 pm, Peacock/NBCSN		at Washington; Acrisure Series on-campus game	L 93−99 ^{2OT}	2−3	24 – Jacobs	7 – Tied	9 – Amboree	Alaska Airlines Arena (5,564); Seattle, WA
November 21, 2025*; 9:00 pm, MWN		at San Jose State; Acrisure Series on-campus game	L 66–80	2–4	24 – Jacobs	5 – Tied	4 – Jacobs	The Event Center (1,773); San Jose, CA
November 29, 2025*; 1:00 pm, ESPN+		at Northwestern State; Acrisure Series on-campus game	W 75–73	3–4	22 – Jacobs	10 – Abdelgowad	9 – Jacobs	Prather Coliseum (304); Natchitoches, LA
December 1, 2025*; 11:00 am		Louisiana Christian	W 101–48	4–4	22 – Jacobs	12 – Abdelgowad	8 – Jacobs	F. G. Clark Center (3,122); Baton Rouge, LA
December 8, 2025*; 7:00 pm, SECN		at Texas	L 69–95	4–5	17 – Abdelgowad	5 – Jones	3 – Jacobs	Moody Center (10,410); Austin, TX
December 10, 2025*; 7:30 pm, ESPN+		at Texas State	L 83–86	4–6	22 – Oshodi	9 – Abdelgowad	4 – Amboree	Strahan Arena (1,428); San Marcos, TX
December 16, 2025*; 9:00 pm, ESPN+		at California Baptist	L 67−75	4−7	18 – Amboree	8 – Dixon Jr.	3 – Amboree	Fowler Events Center (2,425); Riverside, CA
December 21, 2025*; 12:00 pm, TNT/TruTV		at Baylor	L 67–111	4–8	20 – Jacobs	6 – Abdelgowad	4 – Jacobs	Foster Pavilion (7,065); Waco, TX
December 29, 2025*; 2:00 pm, BTN		at No. 20 Illinois	L 55–90	4–9	11 – Jacobs	5 – Jones	3 – Amboree	State Farm Center (15,544); Champaign, IL
SWAC regular season
January 3, 2026; 5:00 pm		Texas Southern	W 84–73	5–9 (1–0)	27 – Jacobs	7 – Abdelgowad	8 – Amboree	F. G. Clark Center (4,357); Baton Rouge, LA
January 5, 2026; 6:00 pm		Prairie View A&M	L 85–89	5–10 (1–1)	30 – Jacobs	8 – Jones	4 – Jacobs	F. G. Clark Center (3,876); Baton Rouge, LA
January 10, 2026; 6:00 pm		at Florida A&M	L 59–67	5–11 (1–2)	20 – Jacobs	7 – Tied	3 – Jacobs	Al Lawson Center (1,005); Tallahassee, FL
January 12, 2026; 6:00 pm		at Bethune–Cookman	W 77–73	6–11 (2–2)	21 – Abdelgowad	18 – Abdelgowad	2 – Tied	Moore Gymnasium (876); Daytona Beach, FL
January 17, 2026; 4:00 pm		at Grambling State	W 71–53	7–11 (3–2)	16 – Oshodi	9 – Jones	9 – Jacobs	Hobdy Assembly Center (4,787); Grambling, LA
January 24, 2026; 5:00 pm		Arkansas–Pine Bluff	L 74−75	7−12 (3−3)	17 – Oshodi	12 – Abdelgowad	11 – Jacobs	F. G. Clark Center (3,652); Baton Rouge, LA
January 28, 2026; 1:00 pm		Mississippi Valley State	W 80−69	8−12 (4−3)	22 – Jacobs	14 – Jones	7 – Jacobs	F. G. Clark Center (2,862); Baton Rouge, LA
January 31, 2026; 3:00 pm		at Alcorn State	L 73−78	8−13 (4−4)	15 – Dixon Jr.	10 – Dixon Jr.	4 – Jacobs	Davey Whitney Complex (994); Lorman, MS
February 2, 2026; 7:00 pm		at Jackson State	W 96–91 ^{OT}	9−13 (5−4)	26 – Oshodi	11 – Barnes	10 – Jacobs	Williams Assembly Center (1,055); Jackson, MS
February 7, 2026; 5:00 pm		Alabama A&M	W 81–68	10−13 (6−4)	18 – Dixon Jr.	16 – Jones	10 – Jacobs	F. G. Clark Center (4,985); Baton Rouge, LA
February 9, 2026; 8:00 pm, ESPNU		Alabama State	W 69−68	11−13 (7−4)	12 – Tied	12 – Jones	6 – Jacobs	F. G. Clark Center (5,127); Baton Rouge, LA
February 14, 2026; 4:30 pm		at Prairie View A&M	W 87–82	12−13 (8−4)	24 – Dixon Jr.	11 – Dixon Jr.	4 – Barnes	William Nicks Building (1,001); Prairie View, TX
February 16, 2026; 7:00 pm		at Texas Southern	L 73–74	12−14 (8−5)	16 – Barnes	8 – Tied	3 – Barnes	H&PE Arena (1,539); Houston, TX
February 21, 2026; 5:00 pm		Grambling State	W 87–73	13−14 (9−5)	22 – Barnes	4 – Tied	8 – Jacobs	F. G. Clark Center (6,958); Baton Rouge, LA
February 26, 2026; 7:30 pm		Florida A&M	L 71–82	13−15 (9−6)	14 – Oshodi	8 – Barnes	6 – Jacobs	F. G. Clark Center (5,123); Baton Rouge, LA
February 28, 2026; 2:30 pm		Bethune–Cookman	L 79–82	13−16 (9−7)	21 – Amboree	8 – Dixon Jr.	9 – Amboree	F. G. Clark Center (5,125); Baton Rouge, LA
March 3, 2026; 7:00 pm		at Alabama State	W 71–64	14−16 (10−7)	21 – Jacobs	8 – Tied	5 – Jacobs	Dunn–Oliver Acadome (1,234); Montgomery, AL
March 5, 2026; 7:30 pm		at Alabama A&M	W 88–85	15−16 (11−7)	19 – Dixon Jr.	6 – Barnes	4 – Jacobs	AAMU Event Center (2,198); Huntsville, AL
SWAC tournament
March 12, 2026; 7:30 pm, ESPN+	(3)	vs. (6) Arkansas–Pine Bluff; Quarterfinals	W 84–81	16–16	18 – Oshodi	11 – Barnes	5 – Amboree	Gateway Center Arena (912); College Park, GA
March 13, 2026; 7:30 pm, ESPN+	(3)	vs. (2) Florida A&M; Semifinals	W 73–70	17–16	19 – Jacobs	9 – Dixon Jr.	7 – Amboree	Gateway Center Arena (2,782); College Park, GA
March 14, 2026; 6:30 pm, ESPNU	(3)	vs. (8) Prairie View A&M; Championship	L 66–72	17–17	19 – Jacobs	10 – Barnes	9 – Jacobs	Gateway Center Arena (2,985); College Park, GA
*Non-conference game. ^{#}Rankings from AP Poll. (#) Tournament seedings in parentheses. All times are in Central.
