= Kyle Green (basketball) =

American basketball coach

Current position
- Title: Head coach
- Team: Northern Iowa
- Conference: MVC

Biographical details
- Born: June 26, 1970 (age 56); Minneapolis, Minnesota, U.S.

Playing career
- 1988–1992: Hamline
- 1992–1993: Frederica BC

Coaching career (HC unless noted)
- 1992–1993: Frederica BC
- 1993–1995: Hamline (assistant)
- 1995–1997: Southwest Minnesota State (assistant)
- 1997–2000: Augustana (SD) (assistant)
- 2000–2001: Western State
- 2001–2003: Northern Iowa (assistant)
- 2003–2004: Marquette (assistant)
- 2004–2006: Lewis
- 2006–2011: Northern Iowa (assistant)
- 2011–2012: Wisconsin–Eau Claire
- 2012–2017: Northern Iowa (assistant)
- 2017–2021: Northern Iowa (AHC)
- 2021–2026: Iowa State (assistant)
- 2026–present: Northern Iowa

Kyle Green (born 1970 or 1971) is an American basketball coach. He is currently the head coach of the Northern Iowa Panthers men's basketball team. He played college basketball for the Hamline Pipers and has previously worked as a coach for the Southwest Minnesota State Mustangs, Augustana (South Dakota) Vikings, Western State Mountaineers, Marquette Golden Eagles, Lewis Flyers, Wisconsin–Eau Claire Blugolds and Iowa State Cyclones.

== Early life ==
Green is from Minneapolis, Minnesota. He attended Hamline University in Minnesota where he played four years of basketball for the Hamline Pipers. Green was a starter on the basketball team three years. He graduated from Hamline in 1992 with a bachelor's degree in social studies and psychology, and later received a master's degree in athletic administration in 1999 from the University of St. Thomas. After Green graduated from Hamline, he served as a player-coach from 1992 to 1993 with the Frederica Basketball Club in Denmark, helping the team compile a record of 30–3 with a national championship, and Green was named the league's coach of the year.

== Coaching career ==
After a year in Denmark, Green served as an assistant coach at Hamline from 1993 to 1995. He then was an assistant coach for the Southwest Minnesota State Mustangs from 1995 to 1997 and for the Augustana (South Dakota) Vikings from 1997 to 2000. Green became the head coach of the Western State Mountaineers in 2000 and served one season. He then was an assistant coach to Greg McDermott from 2001 to 2003 with the Northern Iowa Panthers.

Green was an assistant coach for the Marquette Golden Eagles from 2003 to 2004 and then served as head coach of the Lewis Flyers from 2004 to 2006. He afterwards returned to Northern Iowa as an assistant under Ben Jacobson in 2006 and served until 2011. Green worked the 2011–12 season as head coach of the Wisconsin–Eau Claire Blugolds before returning again to Northern Iowa as an assistant in 2012. At Northern Iowa, he was assistant coach from 2012 to 2017 before receiving a promotion to associate head coach, a role he served in until 2021. During his time as an assistant for the Panthers, he helped them win the Missouri Valley Conference (MVC) tournament four times and the regular season title three times while appearing in the NCAA Tournament four times, including reaching the Sweet 16 in 2010. He left the school in 2021 to become an assistant for the Iowa State Cyclones. In five years he spent at Iowa State, the team made the NCAA Tournament in every year and twice advanced to the Sweet 16.

On April 1, 2026, Green was hired to serve as the next head coach of Northern Iowa on a five-year contract, which became his fourth stint with the school.

== Personal life ==
Green has a son and a daughter with his wife Michele, including A. J. Green who became an NBA player.
