= Callaway High School (Mississippi) =

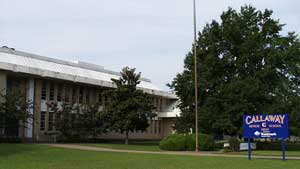

Location
- 601 Beasley Road; Jackson, Mississippi 39206; United States
- Coordinates: 32.38483°N 90.1716°W

Information
- Type: Public secondary
- Motto: "Home of the Mighty Callaway Chargers"
- Established: 1966
- School district: Jackson Public School District
- Principal: Shemeka Sutton-McClung
- Teaching staff: 59.19 (FTE)
- Grades: 9–12
- Enrollment: 955 (2023–2024)
- Student to teacher ratio: 16.13
- Colors: Navy and orange
- Mascot: Chargers
- Website: www.jackson.k12.ms.us/callaway

Callaway High School is a public high school located in Jackson, Mississippi, United States. The principal of Callaway High School is Shemeka Sutton-McClung.

Built in 1966 on approximately twenty acres in North Jackson, Callaway was named after former educator and community activist Robert M. Callaway. Students in grades nine through twelve are enrolled.

The mascot of Callaway is the Charger.

== Demographics ==
In 2023, there were a total of 705 students enrolled in Callaway High.

During the 2006–07 school year, the gender makeup of the district was 51% female and 49% male. The racial makeup of the school was 100% African American.

== History ==
Callaway High School, named after former educator Robert M. Callaway, was built in 1966. Robert, a Lafayette County native, began his career teaching Choctaw Indians in the mountains of McCurtain County, Oklahoma. Before assuming duties as principal of Liberty Grove School, later H.V. Watkins Elementary in Jackson, he taught at Darling in Quitman County and Pocahontas in Hinds County. He was principal at Watkins from 1936 to 1956. The Mississippi Children's Choir recorded "A New Creation" at Callaway in 1994.

== Feeder pattern ==
The following schools feed into Callaway High School.

- Middle Schools
  - Kirksey Middle School
  - Powell Middle School
- Elementary Schools
  - Green Elementary School
  - North Jackson Elementary School

== Sports ==
Callaway participates in boys' and girls' sports as a member of the Jackson Public School District (JPS) system. In 2023, Callaway was promoted to Classification 6A in Mississippi.

- 2022 Boys' Track and Field 5A State Runner-Up
- 2022 Girls' Basketball 5A State Runner-Up
- 2012, 2013, 2014, 2015 Boys' Basketball 5A State Champs

== 1975 Big Eight Conference State title ==
In the 1975 football season Callaway High School won the Big Eight Conference State title. The 1975 Callaway team was the first Big Eight team in the state of Mississippi to record a 12–0 record, it is also the last team in over 50 years from the Jackson Mississippi metro area to go undefeated and rank as the No.1 team in the state. The coach, Charles A. Allman, was chosen Coach of the Year for Metro Jackson three times, and Coach of the Year in 5-A Football for Callaway in 1977 by the MAC. His teams at Callaway had a 33-game winning streak in the '70s.

Team member Tyrone Keys (All-American Mississippi State, and player on the 1985 Super Bowl Champion, Chicago Bears) once stated that the entire defense on the 1975 Callaway defense could have played in the SEC. The offense was also one of the tops in the state that year and produced several players that received football scholarships.

A book has been written by team member Jerome Gentry to discuss the 1975 team and that time period at Callaway. The book, Mississippi’s Uncovered Glory, tells the story about the unity of black and white team members working together to create a powerful bond of achievement. The team included Roy Coleman the first black quarterback to play at Ole Miss, but he was far from the only star on the team as several players went on to have success in both college and the NFL.

Mississippi’s Uncovered Glory also sheds light on how black families lived in Mississippi during the late 1960s and early 1970s and dispels some of the negative perceptions of growing up in Jackson at that time.

== Notable alumni ==
- Malik Heath, professional American football player
- Tyrone Keys, former professional American football player
- Malik Newman, professional basketball player
- Daeshun Ruffin, college basketball player
- Janet Marie Smith, architect for MLB parks
- Jimmy Smith, former NFL wide receiver
- Charles Thomas, professional basketball player
