= 2016–17 Florida Atlantic Owls men's basketball team =

American college basketball season

2016–17 Florida Atlantic Owls men's basketball
- Conference: Conference USA
- Record: 10–20 (6–12 C-USA)
- Head coach: Michael Curry (3rd season)
- Assistant coaches: Charlemagne Gibbons; Ron Oliver; Jorge Sanz
- Home arena: FAU Arena

2016–17 Conference USA men's basketball standings
	Conf.				Overall
Team	W		L	PCT	W		L	PCT
Middle Tennessee †	17	–	1	.944	31	–	5	.861
Louisiana Tech	14	–	4	.778	23	–	10	.697
Old Dominion	12	–	6	.667	19	–	12	.613
UTEP	12	–	6	.667	15	–	17	.469
Rice	11	–	7	.611	23	–	12	.657
Marshall	10	–	8	.556	20	–	15	.571
UAB	9	–	9	.500	17	–	16	.515
Western Kentucky	9	–	9	.500	15	–	17	.469
UTSA	8	–	10	.444	14	–	19	.424
Charlotte	7	–	11	.389	13	–	17	.433
Florida Atlantic	6	–	12	.333	10	–	20	.333
Southern Miss	6	–	12	.333	9	–	22	.290
FIU	3	–	15	.167	7	–	24	.226
North Texas	2	–	16	.111	8	–	22	.267
† 2017 C-USA Tournament winner

The 2016–17 Florida Atlantic Owls men's basketball team represented Florida Atlantic University during the 2016–17 NCAA Division I men's basketball season. The Owls, led by third-year head coach Michael Curry, played their home games at the FAU Arena in Boca Raton, Florida and were members of Conference USA. They finished the season 10–20, 6–12 in C-USA play to finish in a tie for 11th place. They lost in the first round of the C-USA tournament to Marshall.

== Previous season ==
The Owls finished the 2015–16 season 8–25, 5–13 in C-USA play to finish in a tie for 12th place. They defeated UTSA in the first round of the C-USA tournament before losing in the second round to Old Dominion.

== Offseason ==
=== Departures ===
Name	Number	Pos.	Height	Weight	Year	Hometown	Notes
C. J. Turman	0	C	6'9"	250	Sophomore	Madison, GA	Playing professional overseas
Marquan Botley	2	G	5'10"	160	Junior	Plano, TX	Graduate transferred Lynn
Javier Lacunza	5	F	6'9"	215	Senior	Pamplona, Spain	Graduated
Solomon Poole	22	G	6'0"	185	Senior	Jacksonville, FL	Graduated

=== Incoming transfers ===
Name	Number	Pos.	Height	Weight	Year	Hometown	Previous School
Justin Massey	2	G	6'3"	190	Junior	Cooper City, FL	Transferred from Brown. Under NCAA transfer rules, Justin Massey will have to sit out for the 2015–16 season. Will have two years of remaining eligibility.
William Gibbons	4	G	6'2"	175	Junior	Norcross, GA	Junior college transferred from Georgia Highlands College
William Pfister	5	F	6'9"	225	Junior	Lyon, France	Junior college transferred from Northwest Florida State College
Marcus Neely	13	G	6'4"	205	RS Senior	Fort Lauderdale, FL	Transferred from UNC Asheville. Will be eligible to play immediately since Dakich graduated from UNC Asheville.
Gerdarius Troutman	14	G	6'4"	175	Junior	Butler, GA	Junior college transferred from Gordon State College
Jason Massey		G	6'4"	205	Junior	Cooper City, FL	Transferred from Brown. Under NCAA transfer rules, Jason Massey will have to sit out for the 2016–17 season. Will have two years of remaining eligibility.

=== Recruiting class of 2016 ===
College recruiting information
Name	Hometown	School	Height	Weight	Commit date
Devorious Brown; SG	Madison, GA	Morgan County High School	6 ft 3 in (1.91 m)	180 lb (82 kg)	Oct 1, 2014
Devorious Brown; SG	Recruit ratings: Scout: Rivals: (NR)				
Jailyn Ingram; SF	Madison, GA	Morgan County High School	6 ft 5 in (1.96 m)	180 lb (82 kg)	Oct 28, 2015
Jailyn Ingram; SF	Recruit ratings: Scout: Rivals: (NR)				
Overall recruit ranking:
Note: In many cases, Scout, Rivals, 247Sports, On3, and ESPN may conflict in their listings of height and weight.; In these cases, the average was taken. ESPN grades are on a 100-point scale.; Sources: "2016 Team Ranking". Rivals.

=== Recruiting class of 2017 ===
College recruiting information (2017)
Name	Hometown	School	Height	Weight	Commit date
Byron Abrams; PG	Conyers, GA	Heritage High School	6 ft 3 in (1.91 m)	175 lb (79 kg)	Mar 21, 2016
Byron Abrams; PG	Recruit ratings: Scout: Rivals: (NR)				
Tyler Byrd; SG	Chattanooga, TN	Gulf Coast Community College	6 ft 5 in (1.96 m)	200 lb (91 kg)	
Tyler Byrd; SG	Recruit ratings: Scout: Rivals: (NR)				
Overall recruit ranking:
Note: In many cases, Scout, Rivals, 247Sports, On3, and ESPN may conflict in their listings of height and weight.; In these cases, the average was taken. ESPN grades are on a 100-point scale.; Sources: "2017 Team Ranking". Rivals.

== Preseason ==
The Owls were picked to finish in 12th place in the preseason Conference USA poll.

== Roster ==
2016–17 Florida Atlantic Owls men's basketball team
Players
Coaches

Pos.	#	Name	Height	Weight	Year	Previous school	Hometown
G	0	Adonis Filer	6 ft 3 in (1.91 m)	195 lb (88 kg)	RS Sr	Bishop Noll; Clemson	Chicago Heights, IL
G	1	Jeantal Cylla	6 ft 6 in (1.98 m)	210 lb (95 kg)	So	Lake Worth	Lake Worth, TX
G	2	Jason Massey (I) (redshirt)	6 ft 4 in (1.93 m)	200 lb (91 kg)	Jr	American Heritage; Brown	Cooper City, FL
G	4	William Gibbons	6 ft 1 in (1.85 m)	180 lb (82 kg)	Jr	Norcorss; Georgia Highlands	Lithonia, GA
F	5	William Pfister	6 ft 10 in (2.08 m)	230 lb (104 kg)	Jr	NW Florida State	Strasbourg, France
G	10	Nick Rutherford	6 ft 3 in (1.91 m)	197 lb (89 kg)	So	Allen	Allen, TX
G	11	Frank Booker Jr.	6 ft 4 in (1.93 m)	190 lb (86 kg)	RS Jr	Westside; Oklahoma	Augusta, GA
G	12	Devorious Brown	6 ft 2 in (1.88 m)	195 lb (88 kg)	Fr	Morgan County	Madison, GA
G	13	Marcus Neely	6 ft 2 in (1.88 m)	215 lb (98 kg)	RS Sr	Cardinal Gibbons; UNC Asheville	Fort Lauderdale, FL
G	14	Gerdarius Troutman	6 ft 3 in (1.91 m)	175 lb (79 kg)	Jr	Taylor County; Georgia Highlands College	Butler, FL
F	15	Jailyn Ingram	6 ft 7 in (2.01 m)	215 lb (98 kg)	Fr	Morgan County	Madison, GA
F	21	Jordan Phillips	6 ft 5 in (1.96 m)	195 lb (88 kg)	Fr	Sand Creek	Colorado Springs, CO
F	24	Jesse Hill	6 ft 8 in (2.03 m)	225 lb (102 kg)	So	Point Pleasant Beach	Waretown, NJ
F	30	Connor Shorten	6 ft 9 in (2.06 m)	245 lb (111 kg)	So	St. Benedict's Prep	Gladstone, NJ
C	33	Ronald Delph	7 ft 0 in (2.13 m)	245 lb (111 kg)	RS Jr	Lake Region; Auburn	Winter Haven, FL

Head coach

- Michael Curry (Georgia Southern)

Assistant coach(es)

- Charlemagne Gibbons (Auburn Montgomery)
- Ron Oliver (Michigan)
- Jorge Sanz (Florida Atlantic)

Legend

- (C) Team captain
- (S) Suspended
- (I) Ineligible
- (W) Walk-on
- Injured
- Current redshirt

Roster

== Schedule and results ==
Date time, TV	Rank^{#}	Opponent^{#}	Result	Record	Site (attendance) city, state
Non-conference regular season
11/11/2016*; 10:00 pm		vs. Texas State; Rainbow Classic	L 57–61	0–1	ʻIolani School Gym; Honolulu, HI
11/13/2016*; 7:30 pm		vs. SIU Edwardsville; Rainbow Classic	L 68–77	0–2	Stan Sheriff Center; Honolulu, HI
11/15/2016*; 4:15 am, ESPN2		at Hawaii; Rainbow Classic	L 63–64	0–3	Stan Sheriff Center (5,334); Honolulu, HI
11/20/2016*; 1:00 pm		Edward Waters	W 98–64	1–3	FAU Arena (903); Boca Raton, FL
11/22/2016*; 7:00 pm		South Florida	W 78–62	2–3	FAU Arena (1,474); Boca Raton, FL
11/29/2016*; 8:30 pm		at UT Martin	L 81–82	2–4	Skyhawk Arena (1,377); Martin, TN
12/03/2016*; 7:00 pm		Hofstra	L 80–88	2–5	FAU Arena (1,259); Boca Raton, FL
12/06/2016*; 7:00 pm, ESPN3		at Ohio State	W 79–77 ^{OT}	3–5	Value City Arena (11,862); Columbus, OH
12/16/2016*; 7:00 pm, ACCN Extra		at Miami (FL)	L 56–76	3–6	BankUnited Center (6,857); Coral Gables, FL
12/21/2016*; 7:00 pm		Webber International	W 77–57	4–6	FAU Arena (810); Boca Raton, FL
12/28/2016*; 7:00 pm		Florida Gulf Coast	L 62–75	4–7	FAU Arena (1,394); Boca Raton, FL
Conference USA regular season
12/31/2016; 1:00 pm		WKU	L 54–69	4–8 (0–1)	FAU Arena (877); Boca Raton, FL
01/02/2017; 7:00 pm		Marshall	L 72–89	4–9 (0–2)	FAU Arena (1,009); Boca Raton, FL
01/07/2017; 2:00 pm, ASN		FIU	W 73–64	5–9 (1–2)	FAU Arena (1,054); Boca Raton, FL
01/12/2017; 8:00 pm		at UTSA	L 63–68	5–10 (1–3)	Convocation Center (1,417); San Antonio, TX
01/14/2017; 9:00 pm		at UTEP	L 65–66 ^{OT}	5–11 (1–4)	Don Haskins Center (5,745); El Paso, TX
01/19/2017; 8:00 pm, beIN		UAB	L 78–80	5–12 (1–5)	FAU Arena (1,706); Boca Raton, FL
01/21/2017; 7:00 pm		Middle Tennessee	L 57–86	5–13 (1–6)	FAU Arena (1,344); Boca Raton, FL
01/26/2017; 7:00 pm		at FIU	W 83–65	6–13 (2–6)	FIU Arena (1,602); Miami, FL
02/02/2017; 7:00 pm		at Charlotte	W 77–75	7–13 (3–6)	Dale F. Halton Arena (4,707); Charlotte, NC
02/04/2017; 7:00 pm		at Old Dominion	W 65–61	8–13 (4–6)	Ted Constant Convocation Center (6,985); Norfolk, VA
02/09/2017; 7:00 pm		North Texas	L 64–70	8–14 (4–7)	FAU Arena (1,330); Boca Raton, FL
02/11/2017; 7:00 pm		Rice	L 75–81 ^{OT}	8–15 (4–8)	FAU Arena (1,655); Boca Raton, FL
02/16/2017; 7:30 pm		at Louisiana Tech	L 69–95	8–16 (4–9)	Thomas Assembly Center (3,012); Ruston, LA
02/18/2017; 5:00 pm		at Southern Miss	W 94–82	9–16 (5–9)	Reed Green Coliseum (4,137); Hattiesburg, MS
02/23/2017; 7:00 pm		UTEP	L 55–60	9–17 (5–10)	FAU Arena (1,261); Boca Raton, FL
02/25/2017; 7:00 pm		UTSA	W 73–66	10–17 (6–10)	FAU Arena (1,674); Boca Raton, FL
03/02/2017; 8:00 pm		at UAB	L 59–79	10–18 (6–11)	Bartow Arena (3,209); Birmingham, AL
03/04/2017; 6:00 pm, ESPN3		at Middle Tennessee	L 59–93	10–19 (6–12)	Murphy Center (8,806); Murfreesboro, TN
Conference USA tournament
03/08/2017; 9:00 pm, CI	(11)	vs. (6) Marshall; First round	L 74–89	10–20	Legacy Arena (6,410); Birmingham, AL
*Non-conference game. ^{#}Rankings from AP Poll. (#) Tournament seedings in parentheses. All times are in Eastern Time.
