= 2016–17 UTEP Miners men's basketball team =

American college basketball season

2016–17 UTEP Miners men's basketball
- Conference: Conference USA
- Record: 15–17 (12–6 C-USA)
- Head coach: Tim Floyd (7th season)
- Assistant coaches: Phil Johnson; Bob Cantu; Bobby Braswell
- Home arena: Don Haskins Center

2016–17 Conference USA men's basketball standings
	Conf.				Overall
Team	W		L	PCT	W		L	PCT
Middle Tennessee †	17	–	1	.944	31	–	5	.861
Louisiana Tech	14	–	4	.778	23	–	10	.697
Old Dominion	12	–	6	.667	19	–	12	.613
UTEP	12	–	6	.667	15	–	17	.469
Rice	11	–	7	.611	23	–	12	.657
Marshall	10	–	8	.556	20	–	15	.571
UAB	9	–	9	.500	17	–	16	.515
Western Kentucky	9	–	9	.500	15	–	17	.469
UTSA	8	–	10	.444	14	–	19	.424
Charlotte	7	–	11	.389	13	–	17	.433
Florida Atlantic	6	–	12	.333	10	–	20	.333
Southern Miss	6	–	12	.333	9	–	22	.290
FIU	3	–	15	.167	7	–	24	.226
North Texas	2	–	16	.111	8	–	22	.267
† 2017 C-USA Tournament winner

The 2016–16 UTEP Miners basketball team represented the University of Texas at El Paso during the 2016–17 NCAA Division I men's basketball season. The Miners, led by seventh-year head coach Tim Floyd, played their home games at the Don Haskins Center as members of Conference USA. They finished the season 15–17, 12–6 in C-USA play to finish in a tie for third place. In the C-USA tournament, they defeated Rice in the quarterfinals before losing to top-seeded Middle Tennessee in the semifinals. UTEP averaged 6,400 fans per game, ranking 83rd nationally.

== Previous season ==
The Miners finished the 2015–16 season 19–14, 10–8 in C-USA play to finish in sixth place. They defeated FIU in the second round of the C-USA tournament to advance to the quarterfinals where they lost to Marshall.

== Preseason ==
The Miners were picked to finish in sixth place in the preseason Conference USA poll.

== Departures ==
Name	Number	Pos.	Height	Weight	Year	Hometown	Notes
Brodricks Jones	3	F	6'10"	200	Freshman	Los Angeles, CA	Transferred to Wyoming
Lee Moore	4	G	6'4"	175	Junior	Kennesaw, GA	Left to play professionally overseas.
Victor Mbachu	13	G	6'1"	170	RS Senior	Houston, TX	Graduated
Tevin Caldwell	15	G	6'3"	180	RS Senior	El Paso, TX	Graduated
Earvin Morris	20	G	6'4"	175	Senior	Memphis, TN	Graduated
Hooper Vint	23	C	6'11"	235	Senior	Van Buren, AR	Graduated
Christian Romine	34	F/C	6'9"	220	Freshman	Mahomet, IL	Transferred to Illinois State

== Class of 2016 recruits ==
College recruiting information
Name	Hometown	School	Height	Weight	Commit date
Tim Cameron; SG	Norcross, GA	Hargrave Military Academy	6 ft 4 in (1.93 m)	175 lb (79 kg)	Oct 8, 2015
Tim Cameron; SG	Recruit ratings: Scout: Rivals: (80)				
Chris Barnes #90 SG	Long Beach, CA	Compton High School	6 ft 4 in (1.93 m)	180 lb (82 kg)	
Chris Barnes #90 SG	Recruit ratings: Scout: Rivals: (59)				
Deon Barrett; PG	Lancaster, TX	Lancaster High School	5 ft 10 in (1.78 m)	145 lb (66 kg)	Sep 17, 2015
Deon Barrett; PG	Recruit ratings: Scout: Rivals: (NR)				
Roman Silva; C	Pomona, CA	Diamond Ranch High School	7 ft 1 in (2.16 m)	230 lb (100 kg)	Apr 16, 2026
Roman Silva; C	Recruit ratings: Scout: Rivals: (NR)				
Adrian Moore; G	North Little Rock, AR	North Little Rock High School	6 ft 4 in (1.93 m)	175 lb (79 kg)	
Adrian Moore; G	Recruit ratings: Scout: Rivals: (NR)				
Overall recruit ranking:
Note: In many cases, Scout, Rivals, 247Sports, On3, and ESPN may conflict in their listings of height and weight.; In these cases, the average was taken. ESPN grades are on a 100-point scale.; Sources: "2016 Team Ranking". Rivals.

=== Class of 2017 recruits ===
College recruiting information (2017)
Name	Hometown	School	Height	Weight	Commit date
Kobe Magee; PG	San Antonio, TX	Brandeis High School	6 ft 0 in (1.83 m)	N/A	Feb 27, 2016
Kobe Magee; PG	Recruit ratings: Scout: Rivals: (0)				
Overall recruit ranking:
Note: In many cases, Scout, Rivals, 247Sports, On3, and ESPN may conflict in their listings of height and weight.; In these cases, the average was taken. ESPN grades are on a 100-point scale.; Sources: "2017 Team Ranking". Rivals.

== Roster ==
2016–17 UTEP Miners men's basketball team
Players
Coaches

Pos.	#	Name	Height	Weight	Year	Previous school	Hometown
G	1	Dominic Artis	6 ft 3 in (1.91 m)	190 lb (86 kg)	Sr	Findlay Prep; Oregon/Diablo Valley College	San Francisco, CA
G	2	Omega Harris	6 ft 2 in (1.88 m)	170 lb (77 kg)	Jr	Putnam City West HS	Bethany, OK
G	3	Tim Cameron	6 ft 4 in (1.93 m)	180 lb (82 kg)	Fr	Hargrave Military Academy	Norcross, GA
G	4	Adrian Moore	6 ft 4 in (1.93 m)	175 lb (79 kg)	Fr	North Little Rock HS	Little Rock, AR
G	5	Chris Barnes	6 ft 3 in (1.91 m)	180 lb (82 kg)	So	Compton HS	Compton, CA
G/F	11	Jake Flaggert	6 ft 7 in (2.01 m)	200 lb (91 kg)	RS Jr	Lovejoy HS	Lucas, TX
F	12	Terry Winn	6 ft 7 in (2.01 m)	230 lb (104 kg)	RS So	Westwind Preparatory Academy	Monroe, LA
F	13	Ivan Venegas (W)	6 ft 8 in (2.03 m)	230 lb (104 kg)	So	Tecnologico de Monterrey Campus	Chihuahua, Mexico
G	20	Isiah Osborne	6 ft 5 in (1.96 m)	190 lb (86 kg)	So	University of Windsor (Canada)	Windsor, ON
G	21	Trey Touchet	6 ft 2 in (1.88 m)	175 lb (79 kg)	RS So	Saint Thomas More HS	Lafayette, IN
F	22	Paul Thomas	6 ft 8 in (2.03 m)	200 lb (91 kg)	So	Summer Creek HS	Humble, TX
G	23	Deon Barrett	5 ft 10 in (1.78 m)	150 lb (68 kg)	Fr	Lancaster HS	Lancaster, TX
G	25	Hudson Urbanus	6 ft 0 in (1.83 m)	160 lb (73 kg)	Fr	Bowie HS	Austin, TX
C	41	Matt Willms	7 ft 1 in (2.16 m)	235 lb (107 kg)	RS Jr	Findlay Prep	Leamington, ON
C	54	Kelvin James	6 ft 11 in (2.11 m)	235 lb (107 kg)	Fr	Hobbs HS	Hobbs, NM

Head coach

- Tim Floyd (Louisiana Tech)

Assistant coach(es)

- Phil Johnson (East Central)
- Bob Cantu (Chapman)
- Bobby Braswell (Cal State Northridge)

Legend

- (C) Team captain
- (S) Suspended
- (I) Ineligible
- (W) Walk-on
- Injured
- Current redshirt

Roster

== Schedule and results ==
Date time, TV	Rank^{#}	Opponent^{#}	Result	Record	Site (attendance) city, state
Exhibition
Oct 30, 2016*; 1:00 pm		Southeastern Oklahoma	W 80–73		Don Haskins Center (4,838); El Paso, TX
Nov 05, 2016*; 1:00 pm		Alaska Fairbanks	W 87–85 ^{OT}		Don Haskins Center (5,025); El Paso, TX
Non-conference regular season
Nov 12, 2016*; 7:00 pm		Louisiana College	W 88–54	1–0	Don Haskins Center (6,295); El Paso, TX
Nov 17, 2016*; 11:30 am, ESPN3		vs. Wake Forest; Charleston Classic quarterfinals	L 81–103	1–1	TD Arena (4,125); Charleston, SC
Nov 18, 2016*; 1:30 pm, ESPN3		vs. Western Michigan; Charleston Classic consolation round	W 85–75	2–1	TD Arena (4,020); Charleston, SC
Nov 20, 2016*; 1:30 pm, ESPN3		vs. Mississippi State; Charleston Classic 5th place game	L 54–61	2–2	TD Arena (1,293); Charleston, SC
Nov 23, 2016*; 7:00 pm		Southeastern Louisiana	L 56–72	2–3	Don Haskins Center (6,348); El Paso, TX
Dec 03, 2016*; 7:00 pm		Northwestern State	L 67–79	2–4	Don Haskins Center (5,928); El Paso, TX
Dec 07, 2016*; 7:00 pm, RTSW		at New Mexico	L 77–78	2–5	The Pit (11,838); Albuquerque, NM
Dec 13, 2016*; 7:00 pm		New Mexico State; Battle of I-10	L 68–79	2–6	Don Haskins Center (6,815); El Paso, TX
Dec 17, 2016*; 7:00 pm		Northern Arizona	L 74–76	2–7	Don Haskins Center (5,667); El Paso, TX
Dec 21, 2016*; 7:00 pm		Maryland Eastern Shore; Sun Bowl Invitational semifinals	L 66–71	2–8	Don Haskins Center (5,333); El Paso, TX
Dec 22, 2016*; 6:00 pm		UC Irvine; Sun Bowl Invitational 3rd place game	L 57–62	2–9	Don Haskins Center (4,633); El Paso, TX
Dec 30, 2016*; 7:00 pm		at New Mexico State; Battle of I-10	L 70–79	2–10	Pan American Center (5,639); Las Cruces, NM
Conference USA regular season
Jan Jan 2017; 2:00 pm		at UTSA	L 55–67	2–11 (0–1)	Convocation Center (816); San Antonio, TX
Jan 05, 2017; 5:30 pm, CI		at Louisiana Tech	L 44–64	2–12 (0–2)	Thomas Assembly Center (3,205); Ruston, LA
Jan July 2017; 3:00 pm		at Southern Miss	L 65–73	2–13 (0–3)	Reed Green Coliseum (2,161); Hattiesburg, MS
Jan Dec 2017; 7:00 pm		FIU	W 88–87 ^{OT}	3–13 (1–3)	Don Haskins Center (5,696); El Paso, TX
Jan 14, 2017; 7:00 pm		Florida Atlantic	W 66–65 ^{OT}	4–13 (2–3)	Don Haskins Center (5,745); El Paso, TX
Jan 21, 2017; 7:00 pm		UTSA	W 59–39	5–13 (3–3)	Don Haskins Center (6,446); El Paso, TX
Jan 26, 2017; 6:00 pm, beIN		at WKU	L 62–65	5–14 (3–4)	E. A. Diddle Arena (3,859); Bowling Green, KY
Jan 28, 2017; 5:00 pm		at Marshall	W 91–68	6–14 (4–4)	Cam Henderson Center (6,781); Huntington, WV
Feb Feb 2017; 8:00 pm, CBSSN		UAB	W 63–59	7–14 (5–4)	Don Haskins Center (6,248); El Paso, TX
Feb 04, 2017; 6:00 pm, ASN		Middle Tennessee	W 57–54	8–14 (6–4)	Don Haskins Center (6,803); El Paso, TX
Feb 09, 2017; 7:00 pm		Louisiana Tech	L 61–62	8–15 (6–5)	Don Haskins Center (6,698); El Paso, TX
Feb Nov 2017; 7:00 pm		Southern Miss	W 80–50	9–15 (7–5)	Don Haskins Center (6,930); El Paso, TX
Feb 16, 2017; 6:00 pm, beIN		at North Texas	W 77–71 ^{OT}	10–15 (8–5)	The Super Pit (2,672); Denton, TX
Feb 18, 2017; 6:00 pm		at Rice	W 79–71	11–15 (9–5)	Tudor Fieldhouse (2,988); Houston, TX
Feb 23, 2017; 5:00 pm		at Florida Atlantic	W 60–55	12–15 (10–5)	FAU Arena (1,261); Boca Raton, FL
Feb 25, 2017; 5:00 pm		at FIU	W 90−76	13−15 (11−5)	FIU Arena (972); Miami, FL
Mar Feb 2017; 6:00 pm, beIN		Old Dominion	L 61–62	13–16 (11–6)	Don Haskins Center (8,663); El Paso, TX
Mar 04, 2017; 1:00 pm		Charlotte	W 74–67	14–16 (12–6)	Don Haskins Center (8,155); El Paso, TX
Conference USA tournament
Mar 09, 2017; 1:00 pm, ASN	(4)	vs. (5) Rice; Quarterfinals	W 86–76	15–16	Legacy Arena (3,228); Birmingham, AL
Mar 10, 2017; 11:30 am, CBSSN	(4)	vs. (1) Middle Tennessee; Semifinals	L 56–82	15–17	Legacy Arena (3,299); Birmingham, AL
*Non-conference game. ^{#}Rankings from AP Poll. (#) Tournament seedings in parentheses. All times are in Mountain Time. Source

== See also ==
- 2016–17 UTEP Lady Miners basketball team
