= 2016–17 FIU Panthers men's basketball team =

American college basketball season

2016–17 FIU Panthers men's basketball
- Conference: Conference USA
- Record: 7–24 (3–15 C-USA)
- Head coach: Anthony Evans (4th season)
- Assistant coaches: Mike Gillian; Spencer Wright; Erik Pastrana
- Home arena: FIU Arena

2016–17 Conference USA men's basketball standings
	Conf.				Overall
Team	W		L	PCT	W		L	PCT
Middle Tennessee †	17	–	1	.944	31	–	5	.861
Louisiana Tech	14	–	4	.778	23	–	10	.697
Old Dominion	12	–	6	.667	19	–	12	.613
UTEP	12	–	6	.667	15	–	17	.469
Rice	11	–	7	.611	23	–	12	.657
Marshall	10	–	8	.556	20	–	15	.571
UAB	9	–	9	.500	17	–	16	.515
Western Kentucky	9	–	9	.500	15	–	17	.469
UTSA	8	–	10	.444	14	–	19	.424
Charlotte	7	–	11	.389	13	–	17	.433
Florida Atlantic	6	–	12	.333	10	–	20	.333
Southern Miss	6	–	12	.333	9	–	22	.290
FIU	3	–	15	.167	7	–	24	.226
North Texas	2	–	16	.111	8	–	22	.267
† 2017 C-USA Tournament winner

The 2016–17 FIU Panthers men's basketball team represented Florida International University during the 2016–17 NCAA Division I men's basketball season. The Panthers, led by fourth-year head coach Anthony Evans, played their home games at FIU Arena in Miami, Florida and were members of Conference USA. They finished the season 7–24, 3–15 in C-USA play to finish in 13th place. They failed to qualify for the C-USA tournament.

== Previous season ==
The Panthers finished the 2015–16 season 13–19, 7–11 in C-USA play to finish in a three-way tie for ninth place. They lost in the second round of the C-USA tournament to UTEP.

== Offseason ==
=== Departures ===
Name	Number	Pos.	Height	Weight	Year	Hometown	Notes
Tashawn Desir	3	G	5'10"	178	Senior	Brooklyn, NY	Graduated
Ray Rodruquez	11	G	6'1"	180	RS Junior	Miami, FL	Transferred
Adrian Diaz	20	F	6'10"	230	RS Senior	Miami, FL	Graduated
Daviyon Draper	32	F	6'7"	217	Senior	Los Angeles, CA	Graduated
Nate Brown Bull	34	C	7'1"	215	Freshman	Kyle, SD	Transferred to Williston State College

=== Incoming transfers ===
Name	Number	Pos.	Height	Weight	Year	Hometown	Previous School
Michael Kessens	0	F	6'9"	228	RS Senior	Nyon, Switzerland	Transferred from Alabama. Will eligible to play immediately since Kessens graduated from Alabama.
Eric Lockett	5	G	6'5"	189	RS Sophomore	Warner Robins, GA	Junior college transferred from Chipola College.
Richard Bivens	20	G	6'5"	200	Junior	Bakersfield, CA	Junior college transferred from East Los Angeles College
Ronald Whitaker	23	F	6'7"	210	Junior	Washington, D.C.	Junior college transferred SW Tennessee CC

=== Recruiting class of 2016 ===
College recruiting information
Name	Hometown	School	Height	Weight	Commit date
Raekwon Long #50 C	Charlotte, NC	Lincolnton High School	7 ft 0 in (2.13 m)	250 lb (110 kg)	Sep 20, 2015
Raekwon Long #50 C	Recruit ratings: Scout: Rivals: (70)				
Greg Shead; PG	Humble, TX	Atascocita High School	5 ft 11 in (1.80 m)	N/A	Oct 1, 2015
Greg Shead; PG	Recruit ratings: Scout: Rivals: (NR)				
Overall recruit ranking:
Note: In many cases, Scout, Rivals, 247Sports, On3, and ESPN may conflict in their listings of height and weight.; In these cases, the average was taken. ESPN grades are on a 100-point scale.; Sources: "2015 Team Ranking". Rivals.

== Preseason ==
The Panthers were picked to finish in 11th place in the preseason Conference USA poll.

== Roster ==
2016–17 FIU Panthers men's basketball team
Players
Coaches

Pos.	#	Name	Height	Weight	Year	Previous school	Hometown
F	0	Michael Kessens	6 ft 9 in (2.06 m)	228 lb (103 kg)	RS Sr	Lycee Europe Robert Schumann; Alabama/Longwood	Nyon, Switzerland
F	1	Elmo Stephen	6 ft 7 in (2.01 m)	200 lb (91 kg)	Sr	Auburndale; Tallahassee CC	Auburndale, FL
G	2	Donte McGill	6 ft 3 in (1.91 m)	185 lb (84 kg)	Sr	Mont Clare Academy; Vincennes	Newark, DE
G	4	Kimar Williams	6 ft 1 in (1.85 m)	170 lb (77 kg)	So	Constitution	Philadelphia, PA
F	5	Eric Lockett	6 ft 5 in (1.96 m)	193 lb (88 kg)	RS So	Whitefield Academy; George Mason/Chipola College	Atlanta, GA
F	10	Hassan Hussein	6 ft 9 in (2.06 m)	205 lb (93 kg)	RS So	Mt. Zion Prep	Lorton, VA
G	11	Anthony Boswell	6 ft 6 in (1.98 m)	205 lb (93 kg)	Sr	Patrick School	Bronx, NY
G	12	Eric Nottage	6 ft 2 in (1.88 m)	180 lb (82 kg)	Sr	Miami Northwestern; Tallahassee CC	Miami, FL
F	20	Richard Bivens	6 ft 9 in (2.06 m)	205 lb (93 kg)	Jr	Ridgeview; East Los Angeles CC	Bakersfield, CA
G	23	Ronald Whitaker	6 ft 7 in (2.01 m)	192 lb (87 kg)	Jr	Riverdale Baptist; Gulf Coast CC/SW Tennessee CC	Washington, D.C.
F	24	Cameron Smith	6 ft 7 in (2.01 m)	210 lb (95 kg)	Jr	Leon; Tallahassee CC	Tallahassee, FL
F	31	Michael Douglas	6 ft 5 in (1.96 m)	190 lb (86 kg)	Fr	Sachse	Sachse, TX
F	32	Jay Harvey	6 ft 9 in (2.06 m)	246 lb (112 kg)	Jr	TF North; Shawnee CC	Chicago, IL
F	34	Osasumwen Osaghae (W)	6 ft 7 in (2.01 m)	250 lb (113 kg)	Fr	Robert Morgan	Miami, FL

Head coach

- Anthony Evans (St. Thomas Aquinas)

Assistant coach(es)

- Mike Gillian (Adams State)
- Chris Capko (South Florida)
- Erik Pastrana (Florida State)

Legend

- (C) Team captain
- (S) Suspended
- (I) Ineligible
- (W) Walk-on
- Injured
- Current redshirt

Roster

== Schedule and results ==
Date time, TV	Rank^{#}	Opponent^{#}	Result	Record	Site (attendance) city, state
Non-conference regular season
11/11/2016*; 7:00 pm		Florida Memorial	W 76–57	1–0	FIU Arena (908); Miami, FL
11/14/2016*; 7:00 pm		at Stetson	L 67–82	1–1	Edmunds Center (682); DeLand, FL
11/18/2016*; 8:05 pm		at South Alabama; Red Diamond Roundball Classic	L 64–69	1–2	Mitchell Center (2,225); Mobile, AL
11/19/2016*; 1:30 pm		vs. Jacksonville; Red Diamond Roundball Classic	L 75–78 ^{OT}	1–3	Mitchell Center (1,948); Mobile, AL
11/20/2016*; 1:30 pm		vs. Youngstown State; Red Diamond Roundball Classic	L 73–78	1–4	Mitchell Center (1,823); Mobile, AL
11/23/2016*; 7:00 pm		Ave Maria	W 89–72	2–4	FIU Arena (717); Miami, FL
11/27/2016*; 7:00 pm		Binghamton	W 74–57	3–4	FIU Arena (710); Miami, FL
11/30/2016*; 7:00 pm		at Elon	L 81–84	3–5	Alumni Gym (1,388); Elon, NC
12/04/2016*; 2:00 pm		at No. 20 South Carolina	L 54–70	3–6	Colonial Life Arena (10,587); Columbia, SC
12/11/2016*; 8:15 pm		at Florida Gulf Coast	L 63–82	3–7	Alico Arena (3,112); Fort Myers, FL
12/15/2016*; 7:00 pm		Georgia Southern	L 68–75	3–8	FIU Arena (639); Miami, FL
12/17/2016*; 7:00 pm		Northern Illinois	L 53–60	3–9	FIU Arena (810); Miami, FL
12/21/2016*; 7:00 pm		North Florida	W 78–54	4–9	FIU Arena (635); Miami, FL
Conference USA regular season
12/31/2016; 1:00 pm		Marshall	L 70–94	4–10 (0–1)	FIU Arena (598); Miami, FL
01/02/2017; 7:00 pm		WKU	L 66–69	4–11 (0–2)	FIU Arena (644); Miami, FL
01/07/2017; 2:00 pm, ASN		at Florida Atlantic	L 64–73	4–12 (0–3)	FAU Arena (1,054); Boca Raton, FL
01/12/2017; 9:00 pm		at UTEP	L 87–88 ^{OT}	4–13 (0–4)	Don Haskins Center (5,696); El Paso, TX
01/14/2017; 4:00 pm		at UTSA	L 55–57	4–14 (0–5)	Convocation Center (1,138); San Antonio, TX
01/19/2017; 7:00 pm		Middle Tennessee	L 52–65	4–15 (0–6)	FIU Arena (1,401); Miami, FL
01/21/2017; 7:00 pm		UAB	W 94–85	5–15 (1–6)	FIU Arena (1,263); Miami, FL
01/26/2017; 7:00 pm		Florida Atlantic	L 65–83	5–16 (1–7)	FIU Arena (1,602); Miami, FL
02/02/2017; 7:00 pm		at Old Dominion	L 57–64	5–17 (1–8)	Ted Constant Convocation Center (5,757); Norfolk, VA
02/04/2017; 7:00 pm		at Charlotte	L 80–95	5–18 (1–9)	Dale F. Halton Arena (5,316); Charlotte, NC
02/09/2017; 7:00 pm		Rice	L 78–89	5–19 (1–10)	FIU Arena (802); Miami, FL
02/11/2017; 7:00 pm		North Texas	W 90–71	6–19 (2–10)	FIU Arena (877); Miami, FL
02/16/2017; 8:00 pm		at Southern Miss	L 66–69 ^{OT}	6–20 (2–11)	Reed Green Coliseum (3,494); Hattiesburg, MS
02/18/2017; 7:00 pm		at Louisiana Tech	L 61–77	6–21 (2–12)	Thomas Assembly Center (3,418); Ruston, LA
02/23/2017; 7:00 pm		UTSA	L 67–69	6–22 (2–13)	FIU Arena (632); Miami, FL
02/25/2017; 7:00 pm		UTEP	L 76–90	6–23 (2–14)	FIU Arena (902); Miami, FL
03/02/2017; 7:30 pm, ESPN3		at Middle Tennessee	L 67–70	6–24 (2–14)	Murphy Center (5,510); Murfreesboro, TN
03/04/2017; 8:00 pm		at UAB	W 68–56	7–24 (3–15)	Bartow Arena (3,881); Birmingham, AL
*Non-conference game. ^{#}Rankings from AP Poll. (#) Tournament seedings in parentheses. All times are in Eastern Time. Source
