= 2016–17 Western Kentucky Hilltoppers basketball team =

American college basketball season

2016–17 Western Kentucky Hilltoppers basketball
- Conference: Conference USA
- Record: 15–17 (9–9 C-USA)
- Head coach: Rick Stansbury (1st season)
- Assistant coaches: Chris Cheeks; Shammond Williams; Quannas White
- Home arena: E. A. Diddle Arena

2016–17 Conference USA men's basketball standings
| | Conf. | | | | Overall |
| Team | W | | L | PCT | W | | L | PCT |
|---|---|---|---|---|---|---|---|---|
| Middle Tennessee † | 17 | – | 1 | .944 | 31 | – | 5 | .861 |
| Louisiana Tech | 14 | – | 4 | .778 | 23 | – | 10 | .697 |
| Old Dominion | 12 | – | 6 | .667 | 19 | – | 12 | .613 |
| UTEP | 12 | – | 6 | .667 | 15 | – | 17 | .469 |
| Rice | 11 | – | 7 | .611 | 23 | – | 12 | .657 |
| Marshall | 10 | – | 8 | .556 | 20 | – | 15 | .571 |
| UAB | 9 | – | 9 | .500 | 17 | – | 16 | .515 |
| Western Kentucky | 9 | – | 9 | .500 | 15 | – | 17 | .469 |
| UTSA | 8 | – | 10 | .444 | 14 | – | 19 | .424 |
| Charlotte | 7 | – | 11 | .389 | 13 | – | 17 | .433 |
| Florida Atlantic | 6 | – | 12 | .333 | 10 | – | 20 | .333 |
| Southern Miss | 6 | – | 12 | .333 | 9 | – | 22 | .290 |
| FIU | 3 | – | 15 | .167 | 7 | – | 24 | .226 |
| North Texas | 2 | – | 16 | .111 | 8 | – | 22 | .267 |
† 2017 C-USA Tournament winner

The 2016–17 Western Kentucky Hilltoppers men's basketball team represented Western Kentucky University during the 2016–17 NCAA Division I men's basketball season. The Hilltoppers were led by head coach Rick Stansbury in his first season. They played their home games at E. A. Diddle Arena in Bowling Green, Kentucky and were third-year members of Conference USA. They finished the season 15–17, 9–9 in C-USA play to finish in a tie for seventh place. They lost to UTSA in the first round of the C-USA tournament.

== Previous season ==
The Hilltoppers finished the 2015–16 season 18–16, 8–10 in C-USA play to finish in eighth place. They defeated North Texas and UAB to advance to the semifinals of the C-USA tournament where they lost to Old Dominion. Despite having 18 wins and a better they .500 record, they did not participate in a postseason tournament.

On March 17, 2016, head coach Ray Harper resigned after three players were suspended by a university disciplinary committee. He finished at WKU with a record of 90–62. On March 28, the school hired Rick Stansbury as head coach.

== Offseason ==
=== Departures ===
| Name | Number | Pos. | Height | Weight | Year | Hometown | Notes |
|---|---|---|---|---|---|---|---|
| Chris McNeal | 1 | G | 6'0" | 195 | Freshman | Jackson, Tennessee | Transferred to Indian Hills CC |
| Aaron Cosby | 2 | G | 6'3" | 200 | RS Senior | Louisville, Kentucky | Graduated |
| Marlon Hunter Jr. | 3 | G | 6'2" | 195 | Freshman | Memphis, Tennessee | Transferred to Odessa College |
| Phabian Glasco | 13 | F | 6'7" | 230 | Junior | Tulsa, Oklahoma | Left the team for personal reasons |
| Dylan Sanford | 15 | G | 6'1" | 180 | Freshman | Owensboro, Kentucky | Left the team for personal reasons |
| Aleksej Rostov | 20 | C | 6'10" | 240 | Senior | Riga, Latvia | Graduated |
| Nigel Snipes | 21 | F | 6'6" | 220 | RS Senior | Marietta, Georgia | Graduated |
| Nathan Smith | 22 | C | 7'2" | 240 | Freshman | London, England | Left the team for personal reasons |
| Frederick Edmond | 25 | G | 6'4" | 205 | Junior | Lansing, Michigan | Transferred |
| Keifer Dalton | 32 | G | 5'11" | 165 | Freshman | Albany, Kentucky | Walk-on; left the team for personal reasons |
| Chris Harrison-Docks | 51 | G | 6'0" | 175 | RS Junior | Okemos, Michigan | Graduate transferred to DePaul |

=== Incoming transfers ===
| Name | Number | Pos. | Height | Weight | Year | Hometown | Previous School |
|---|---|---|---|---|---|---|---|
| Junior Lomomba | 5 | G | 6'5" | 205 | RS Junior | Montreal, QE | Transferred from Providence. Lomomba will be eligible to play immediately since Lomomba graduated from Providence. |
| Que Johnson | 32 | F | 6'5" | 208 | RS Senior | Pontiac, Michigan | Transferred from Washington State. Johnson will be eligible to play immediately since Johnson graduated from Washington State. |
| Cleveland Thomas | 12 | G | 6'3" | 195 | RS Senior | Baton Rouge, Louisiana | Transferred from Hartford. Thomas will be eligible to play immediately since Thomas graduated from Hartford. |
| Lamonte Bearden | | G | 6'3" | 160 | Junior | Milawaukee, Wisconsin | Transferred from Buffalo. Under NCAA transfer rules, Bearden will have to sit out for the 2016–17 season. Will have two years of remaining eligibility. |
| Moustapha Diagne | | C | 6'9" | 245 | Sophomore | Dakar, Senegal | Junior college transferred from Northwest Florida State College. He will have to sit out the 2016–17 season and will have three years of eligibility left. |

=== Future recruits ===
==== Class of 2016 recruits ====
College recruiting
| Name | Hometown | School | Height | Weight | Commit date |
|---|---|---|---|---|---|
| T.J. Howard; PG | Lithonia, Georgia | DME Academy | 6 ft 1 in (1.85 m) | 175 lb (79 kg) | Oct 17, 2015 |
| T.J. Howard; PG | Recruit ratings: Scout: Rivals: 247Sports: ESPN: (NR) | | | | |
| Damari Parris; PG | Charlotte, North Carolina | Evelyn Mack Academy | 5 ft 11 in (1.80 m) | 180 lb (82 kg) | May 6, 2016 |
| Damari Parris; PG | Recruit ratings: Scout: Rivals: 247Sports: ESPN: (NR) | | | | |
| Robinson Idehen; C | Modesto, California | Modesto Christian School | 6 ft 9 in (2.06 m) | 205 lb (93 kg) | Jun 13, 2016 |
| Robinson Idehen; C | Recruit ratings: Scout: Rivals: 247Sports: ESPN: (NR) | | | | |
Overall recruit ranking:
Note: In many cases, Scout, Rivals, 247Sports, On3, and ESPN may conflict in their listings of height and weight.; In these cases, the average was taken. ESPN grades are on a 100-point scale.; Sources: "2016 Team Ranking". Rivals.

==== Class of 2017 recruits ====
College recruiting (2017)
| Name | Hometown | School | Height | Weight | Commit date |
|---|---|---|---|---|---|
| Mitchell Robinson; C | New Orleans, Louisiana | Chalmette High School | 6 ft 11 in (2.11 m) | 215 lb (98 kg) | Jun 29, 2016 |
| Mitchell Robinson; C | Recruit ratings: Scout: Rivals: 247Sports: ESPN: (95) | | | | |
| Josh Anderson; F | Baton Rouge, Louisiana | Madison Prep Academy | 6 ft 5 in (1.96 m) | 180 lb (82 kg) | Sep 20, 2016 |
| Josh Anderson; F | Recruit ratings: Scout: Rivals: 247Sports: ESPN: (84) | | | | |
| Chris Duarte; G | Troy, New York | Redemption Christian Academy | 6 ft 5 in (1.96 m) | 180 lb (82 kg) | May 16, 2017 |
| Chris Duarte; G | Recruit ratings: Scout: Rivals: 247Sports: ESPN: (75) | | | | |
| Taveion Hollingsworth; G | Lexington, Kentucky | Paul Laurence Dunbar School | 6 ft 2 in (1.88 m) | 170 lb (77 kg) | Nov 9, 2016 |
| Taveion Hollingsworth; G | Recruit ratings: Scout: Rivals: 247Sports: ESPN: (NR) | | | | |
| Jake Ohmer; G | Covington, Kentucky | Scott High School | 5 ft 10 in (1.78 m) | 150 lb (68 kg) | Mar 20, 2017 |
| Jake Ohmer; G | Recruit ratings: Scout: Rivals: 247Sports: ESPN: (NR) | | | | |
| Marek Nelson; F | Plano, Texas | Sunrise Christian Academy (KS) | 6 ft 7 in (2.01 m) | 180 lb (82 kg) | May 14, 2017 |
| Marek Nelson; F | Recruit ratings: Scout: Rivals: 247Sports: ESPN: (NR) | | | | |
Overall recruit ranking:
Note: In many cases, Scout, Rivals, 247Sports, On3, and ESPN may conflict in their listings of height and weight.; In these cases, the average was taken. ESPN grades are on a 100-point scale.; Sources: "2017 Team Ranking". Rivals.

== Preseason ==
The Hilltoppers were picked to finish in third place in the preseason Conference USA poll. Justin Johnson was selected to the preseason All-Conference USA team.

== Roster ==
2016–17 WKU Hilltoppers men's basketball team
Players
Coaches

| Pos. | # | Name | Height | Weight | Year | Previous school | Hometown |
|---|---|---|---|---|---|---|---|
| F | 00 | Jabari McGhee | 6 ft 7 in (2.01 m) | 205 lb (93 kg) | RS So | Tennessee | Albany, Georgia |
| G | 1 | Tobias Howard | 6 ft 2 in (1.88 m) | 185 lb (84 kg) | Fr | DME Academy | Lithonia, Georgia |
| G | 3 | Damari Parris | 6 ft 0 in (1.83 m) | 160 lb (73 kg) | Fr | Evelyn Mack Academy | Bowie, Maryland |
| G | 5 | Junior Lomomba | 6 ft 5 in (1.96 m) | 205 lb (93 kg) | RS Sr | Providence | Montreal, Quebec |
| G | 12 | Pancake Thomas | 6 ft 4 in (1.93 m) | 195 lb (88 kg) | RS Sr | Hartford | Baton Rouge, Louisiana |
| F | 14 | Benjamin Lawson | 7 ft 1 in (2.16 m) | 235 lb (107 kg) | Sr | Oaklands College | Hitchin, England |
| F | 12 | Moustapha Diagne (redshirt) | 6 ft 9 in (2.06 m) | 245 lb (111 kg) | So | Northwest Florida State College | Dakar, Senegal |
| G | 15 | Tyler Miller | 6 ft 4 in (1.93 m) | 185 lb (84 kg) | Jr | 22ft Academy | Louisville, Kentucky |
| G | 21 | Marko Stajkovski | 6 ft 7 in (2.01 m) | 195 lb (88 kg) | Fr | E-Gimnazija Novi Sad | Novi Sad, Serbia |
| F | 23 | Justin Johnson | 6 ft 7 in (2.01 m) | 240 lb (109 kg) | Jr | Perry County Central High School | Hazard, Kentucky |
| F | 24 | Willie Carmichael | 6 ft 8 in (2.03 m) | 210 lb (95 kg) | RS So | Tennessee | Apopka, Florida |
| G | 32 | Que Johnson | 6 ft 6 in (1.98 m) | 205 lb (93 kg) | RS Sr | Washington State | Pontiac, Michigan |
| F | 42 | Anton Waters | 6 ft 7 in (2.01 m) | 245 lb (111 kg) | Sr | Gulf Coast State College | Baltimore, Maryland |
| G | 43 | Marty Leahy | 6 ft 5 in (1.96 m) | 210 lb (95 kg) | Fr | Ipswich Grammar School | Brisbane, Australia |
| G | | Lamonte Bearden (I) (redshirt) | 6 ft 3 in (1.91 m) | 160 lb (73 kg) | Jr | Buffalo | Milwaukee, Wisconsin |

Head coach

- Rick Stansbury (Campbellsville)

Assistant coach(es)

- Chris Cheeks (Virginia Commonwealth)
- Shammond Williams (North Carolina)
- Quannas White (Oklahoma)

Legend

- (C) Team captain
- (S) Suspended
- (I) Ineligible
- (W) Walk-on
- Injured
- Current redshirt

Roster

== Schedule and results ==
| Date time, TV | Rank^{#} | Opponent^{#} | Result | Record | Site (attendance) city, state |
Exhibition
| 11/01/2016*; 7:00 pm, WKUSports.tv | | Campbellsville | W 87–79 | | E. A. Diddle Arena (3,887); Bowling Green, KY |
| 11/05/2016*; 8:00 pm, WKUSports.tv | | Kentucky Wesleyan | W 103–97 ^{2OT} | | E. A. Diddle Arena (4,264); Bowling Green, KY |
Non-conference regular season
| 11/12/2016*; 7:00 pm, WKUSports.tv | | Alabama State; Global Sports Classic | W 79–66 | 1–0 | E. A. Diddle Arena (4,149); Bowling Green, KY |
| 11/16/2016*; 8:00 pm, FCS/WKYU/WBNA | | Jacksonville State; Global Sports Classic | W 74–67 | 2–0 | E. A. Diddle Arena (4,226); Bowling Green, KY |
| 11/19/2016*; 7:00 pm, OVCDN | | Belmont | L 69–90 | 2–1 | Curb Event Center (3,319); Nashville, TN |
| 11/22/2016*; 7:00 pm, FCS/WKYU/WBNA | | North Carolina A&T | W 77–56 | 3–1 | E. A. Diddle Arena (3,751); Bowling Green, KY |
| 11/25/2016*; 7:00 pm, CI | | vs. Washington; Global Sports Classic semifinals | L 47–86 | 3–2 | Thomas & Mack Center (9,815); Paradise, NV |
| 11/26/2016*; 7:00 pm, CI | | at UNLV; Global Sports Classic 3rd place game | L 61–71 | 3–3 | Thomas & Mack Center (8,810); Paradise, NV |
| 11/30/2016*; 7:00 pm, FCS/WKYU/WBNA | | at Eastern Kentucky | L 59–78 | 3–4 | McBrayer Arena (5,400); Richmond, KY |
| 12/03/2016*; 2:00 pm, SECN+ | | at Missouri | L 56–59 | 3–5 | Mizzou Arena (4,547); Columbia, MO |
| 12/11/2016*; 3:30 pm, ESPN3 | | at Indiana State | W 77–59 | 4–5 | Hulman Center (3,345); Terre Haute, IN |
| 12/14/2016*; 9:00 pm | | at No. 20 Saint Mary's | L 51–73 | 4–6 | McKeon Pavilion (2,581); Moraga, CA |
| 12/17/2016*; 1:00 pm, ESPN3 | | at Detroit | L 79–85 | 4–7 | Calihan Hall (1,027); Detroit, MI |
| 12/21/2016*; 8:00 pm, FCS/WKYU/WBNA | | Ohio | W 67–66 | 5–7 | E. A. Diddle Arena (2,746); Bowling Green, KY |
| 12/28/2016*; 7:00 pm, FCS/WKYU/WBNA | | Austin Peay | W 97–92 | 6–7 | E. A. Diddle Arena (3,913); Bowling Green, KY |
Conference USA regular season
| 12/31/2016; 12:00 pm, FCS/WKYU/WBNA | | at Florida Atlantic | W 69–54 | 7–7 (1–0) | FAU Arena (877); Boca Raton, FL |
| 01/02/2017; 6:00 pm, FCS/WKYU/WBNA | | at FIU | W 69–66 | 8–7 (2–0) | FIU Arena (644); Miami, FL |
| 01/05/2017; 7:00 pm, FCS/WKYU/WBNA | | Charlotte | W 82–80 | 9–7 (3–0) | E. A. Diddle Arena (2,568); Bowling Green, KY |
| 01/07/2017; 5:00 pm, ASN | | Old Dominion | L 67–79 | 9–8 (3–1) | E. A. Diddle Arena (4,122); Bowling Green, KY |
| 01/12/2017; 7:00 pm, CI | | at UAB | L 54–72 | 9–9 (3–2) | Bartow Arena (3,745); Birmingham, AL |
| 01/14/2017; 7:00 pm, ASN | | at Middle Tennessee | L 76–91 | 9–10 (3–3) | Murphy Center (6,806); Murfreesboro, TN |
| 01/21/2017; 5:00 pm, ASN | | at Marshall | L 80–94 | 9–11 (3–4) | Cam Henderson Center (6,813); Huntington, WV |
| 01/26/2017; 7:00 pm, beIN | | UTEP | W 65–62 | 10–11 (4–4) | E. A. Diddle Arena (3,859); Bowling Green, KY |
| 01/28/2017; 3:00 pm, FCS/WKYU/WBNA | | UTSA | W 81–66 | 11–11 (5–4) | E. A. Diddle Arena (4,298); Bowling Green, KY |
| 02/02/2017; 7:00 pm, beIN | | at Louisiana Tech | L 67–76 | 11–12 (5–5) | Thomas Assembly Center (3,802); Ruston, LA |
| 02/04/2017; 4:00 pm, FCS/WKYU/WBNA | | at Southern Miss | W 64–47 | 12–12 (6–5) | Reed Green Coliseum (2,946); Hattiesburg, MS |
| 02/11/2017; 5:00 pm, FCS/WKYU/WBNA | | Marshall | L 79–84 | 12–13 (6–6) | E. A. Diddle Arena (4,742); Bowling Green, KY |
| 02/16/2017; 8:00 pm, CBSSN | | Middle Tennessee | L 52–78 | 12–14 (6–7) | E. A. Diddle Arena (4,385); Bowling Green, KY |
| 02/19/2017; 1:00 pm, CBSSN | | UAB | W 76–64 | 13–14 (7–7) | E. A. Diddle Arena (3,553); Bowling Green, KY |
| 02/23/2016; 6:00 pm, CI | | at Charlotte | L 77–83 | 13–15 (7–8) | Dale F. Halton Arena (3,655); Charlotte, NC |
| 02/25/2016; 6:00 pm, ESPN3 | | at Old Dominion | L 53–67 | 13–16 (7–9) | Ted Constant Convocation Center (7,355); Norfolk, VA |
| 03/02/2017; 7:00 pm, FCS/WKYU/WBNA | | North Texas | W 74–63 | 14–16 (8–9) | E. A. Diddle Arena (3,676); Bowling Green, KY |
| 03/04/2017; 7:00 pm | | Rice | W 79–72 | 15–16 (9–9) | E. A. Diddle Arena (4,823); Bowling Green, KY |
Conference USA Tournament
| 03/08/2017; 11:30 am, CI | (8) | vs. (9) UTSA; First round | L 52–56 | 15–17 | Legacy Arena (3,207); Birmingham, AL |
*Non-conference game. ^{#}Rankings from AP Poll. (#) Tournament seedings in parentheses. All times are in Central Time Source.

== Awards and honors ==
Following the regular season, Justin Johnson was named to the All-Conference USA Second Team based on a poll of league coaches.

== See also ==
2016–17 WKU Lady Toppers basketball team
