= 2017 Conference USA men's basketball tournament =

- Classification: Division I
- Season: 2016–17
- Teams: 12
- Site: Legacy Arena; Birmingham, Alabama
- Champions: Middle Tennessee Blue Raiders (2nd title)
- Winning coach: Kermit Davis (2nd title)
- MVP: Giddy Potts (Middle Tennessee)
- Television: ASN, CBSSN

2016–17 Conference USA men's basketball standings
	Conf.				Overall
Team	W		L	PCT	W		L	PCT
Middle Tennessee †	17	–	1	.944	31	–	5	.861
Louisiana Tech	14	–	4	.778	23	–	10	.697
Old Dominion	12	–	6	.667	19	–	12	.613
UTEP	12	–	6	.667	15	–	17	.469
Rice	11	–	7	.611	23	–	12	.657
Marshall	10	–	8	.556	20	–	15	.571
UAB	9	–	9	.500	17	–	16	.515
Western Kentucky	9	–	9	.500	15	–	17	.469
UTSA	8	–	10	.444	14	–	19	.424
Charlotte	7	–	11	.389	13	–	17	.433
Florida Atlantic	6	–	12	.333	10	–	20	.333
Southern Miss	6	–	12	.333	9	–	22	.290
FIU	3	–	15	.167	7	–	24	.226
North Texas	2	–	16	.111	8	–	22	.267
† 2017 C-USA Tournament winner

The 2017 Conference USA men's basketball tournament was held March 8–11, 2017, in Birmingham, Alabama, at Legacy Arena. Middle Tennessee received the conference automatic bid to the 2017 NCAA tournament with an 83-72 win over Marshall in the finals.

== Seeds ==
Only 12 conference teams are eligible for the tournament. As a result, the top 4 teams receive a bye to the quarterfinals of the tournament.

Teams are seeded by record within the conference, with a tiebreaker system to seed teams with identical conference records.

Seed	School	Conference	Tiebreaker
1	Middle Tennessee	17–1	
2	Louisiana Tech	14–4	
3	Old Dominion	12–6	1–0 vs. UTEP
4	UTEP	12–6	0–1 vs. Old Dominion
5	Rice	11–7	
6	Marshall	10–8	
7	UAB	9–9	1–0 vs. Louisiana Tech
8	WKU	9–9	0–1 vs. Louisiana Tech
9	UTSA	8–10	
10	Charlotte	7–11	
11	FAU	6–12	1–0 vs. Southern Miss
12	Southern Miss	6–12	0–1 vs. FAU

== Schedule ==
Rankings denote tournament seed.

Round	Date	Game	Matchup^{#}	Score	Television	Attendance
First	March 8, 2017	1	No. 8 Western Kentucky vs. No. 9 UTSA	52–56	Campus Insiders	3,207
First	March 8, 2017	2	No. 5 Rice vs. No. 12 Southern Miss	86–75	Campus Insiders	3,207
First	March 8, 2017	3	No. 7 UAB vs. No. 10 Charlotte	74–73	Campus Insiders	6,410
First	March 8, 2017	4	No. 6 Marshall vs. No. 11 Florida Atlantic	89–74	Campus Insiders	6,410
Quarterfinals	March 9, 2017	5	No. 1 Middle Tennessee vs. No. 9 UTSA	86–70	ASN	3,654
Quarterfinals	March 9, 2017	6	No. 4 UTEP vs. No. 5 Rice	86–76	ASN	3,654
Quarterfinals	March 9, 2017	7	No. 2 Louisiana Tech vs. No. 7 UAB	69–57	ASN	4,005
Quarterfinals	March 9, 2017	8	No. 3 Old Dominion vs. No. 6 Marshall	63–64	ASN	4,005
Semifinals	March 10, 2017	9	No. 1 Middle Tennessee vs. No. 4 UTEP	82–56	CBSSN	3,299
Semifinals	March 10, 2017	10	No. 2 Louisiana Tech vs. No. 6 Marshall	77–93	CBSSN	3,299
Championship	March 11, 2017	11	No. 1 Middle Tennessee vs. No. 6 Marshall	83–72	CBSSN	3,956

== Bracket ==
First round Wednesday, March 8
8	Western Kentucky	52
9	UTSA	56
5	Rice	86
12	Southern Miss	75
7	UAB	74
10	Charlotte	73
6	Marshall	89
11	Florida Atlantic	74

Quarterfinals; Thursday, March 9 ASN
1	Middle Tennessee	86
9	UTSA	70
4	UTEP	86
5	Rice	76
2	Louisiana Tech	69
7	UAB	57
3	Old Dominion	63
6	Marshall	64

Semifinals; Friday, March 10; CBSSN
1	Middle Tennessee	82
4	UTEP	56
2	Louisiana Tech	77
6	Marshall	93

Championship; Saturday, March 11; CBSSN
1	Middle Tennessee	83
6	Marshall	72

== See also ==
- 2017 Conference USA women's basketball tournament
