= 2016–17 North Texas Mean Green men's basketball team =

American college basketball season

2016–17 North Texas Mean Green men's basketball
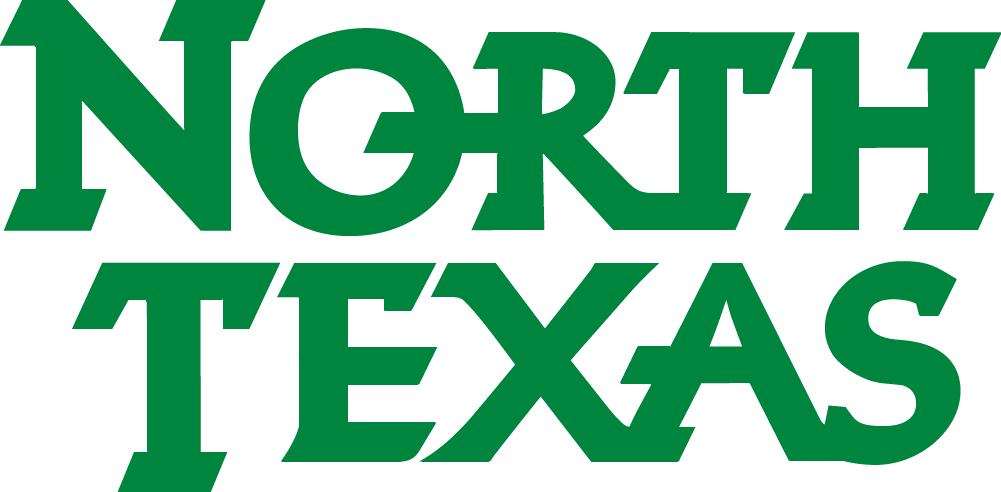
- Conference: Conference USA
- Record: 8–22 (2–16 C-USA)
- Head coach: Tony Benford (5th season)
- Assistant coaches: Rob Evans; Dan O'Dowd; David Anwar
- Home arena: The Super Pit (Capacity: 10,040)

2016–17 Conference USA men's basketball standings
	Conf.				Overall
Team	W		L	PCT	W		L	PCT
Middle Tennessee †	17	–	1	.944	31	–	5	.861
Louisiana Tech	14	–	4	.778	23	–	10	.697
Old Dominion	12	–	6	.667	19	–	12	.613
UTEP	12	–	6	.667	15	–	17	.469
Rice	11	–	7	.611	23	–	12	.657
Marshall	10	–	8	.556	20	–	15	.571
UAB	9	–	9	.500	17	–	16	.515
Western Kentucky	9	–	9	.500	15	–	17	.469
UTSA	8	–	10	.444	14	–	19	.424
Charlotte	7	–	11	.389	13	–	17	.433
Florida Atlantic	6	–	12	.333	10	–	20	.333
Southern Miss	6	–	12	.333	9	–	22	.290
FIU	3	–	15	.167	7	–	24	.226
North Texas	2	–	16	.111	8	–	22	.267
† 2017 C-USA Tournament winner

The 2016–17 North Texas Mean Green men's basketball team represented the University of North Texas during the 2016–17 NCAA Division I men's basketball season. The Mean Green, led by fifth-year head coach Tony Benford, played their home games at UNT Coliseum, nicknamed The Super Pit, in Denton, Texas, as members of Conference USA. They finished the season 8–22, 2–16 in C-USA play to finish in last place. They failed to qualify for the C-USA tournament.

On March 5, 2017, the school fired head coach Tony Benford after five years without a winning season. On March 13, the school hired Arkansas State head coach Grant McCasland to the same role.

== Previous season ==
The Mean Green finished the 2015–16 season 12–20, 7–11 in C-USA play to finish in a three-way tie for ninth place. They lost in the second round of the C-USA tournament to WKU.

== Preseason ==
The Mean Grean was picked to finish in 10th place in the preseason Conference USA poll. Jeremy Combs was selected to the preseason All-Conference USA team.

== Departures ==
Name	Number	Pos.	Height	Weight	Year	Hometown	Notes
Carrington Ward	0	G	6'2"	180	RS Junior	Philadelphia, PA	Graduate transferred to Norfolk State
Chris Campbell	12	G	6'3"	180	Senior	Houston, TX	Graduated
Mike Thomas	14	C	6'11"	225	Junior	Ville Platte, IN	Ineligible for the 2016–17 season
DeAndre Harris	15	G	6'3"	191	RS Junior	Milwaukee, WI	Graduate transferred to Nicholls State
Eric Katenda	20	F	6'9"	240	Senior	Paris, France	Graduated
Todd Eaglin	30	G	5'11"	180	Senior	The Woodlands, TX	Graduated

=== Incoming transfers ===
Name	Number	Pos.	Height	Weight	Year	Hometown	Previous School
Ryan Woolridge	0	G	6'3"	170	Sophomore	Mansfield, TX	Transferred from San Diego. Under NCAA transfer rules, Woolridge will have to sit out for the 2016–17 season. Will have three years of remaining eligibility.
Kevin Frazier	4	G	6'5"	190	Senior	Dallas, TX	Transferred from SMU. Under NCAA transfer rules, Frazier will have to sit out for the 2016–17 season. Will have one year of remaining eligibility.
Derail Green	11	F	6'7"	215	RS Senior	Houston, TX	Transferred from Incarnate Word. Will eligible to play since Green graduated from Incarnate Word.
Shane Temara	50	F	6'9"	235	Junior	Syracuse, NY	Junior college transferred from Angelina College.

== Recruiting class of 2016 ==
College recruiting information
Name	Hometown	School	Height	Weight	Commit date
A.J. Lawson; SF	Bryan, TX	Bryan High School	6 ft 5 in (1.96 m)	191 lb (87 kg)	Oct 4, 2015
A.J. Lawson; SF	Recruit ratings: Scout: Rivals: (0)				
Overall recruit ranking:
Note: In many cases, Scout, Rivals, 247Sports, On3, and ESPN may conflict in their listings of height and weight.; In these cases, the average was taken. ESPN grades are on a 100-point scale.; Sources: "2016 Team Ranking". Rivals.

== Roster ==
2016–17 North Texas Mean Green men's basketball team
Players
Coaches

Pos.	#	Name	Height	Weight	Year	Previous school	Hometown
G	0	Ryan Woolridge (I) (redshirt)	6 ft 3 in (1.91 m)	175 lb (79 kg)	So	Lake Ridge HS; San Diego	Mansfield, TX
F	1	Jeremy Combs	6 ft 7 in (2.01 m)	215 lb (98 kg)	Jr	Carter HS	Dallas, TX
G	2	Greg White-Pittman	6 ft 2 in (1.88 m)	205 lb (93 kg)	Jr	Holy Cross HS	New Orleans, LA
G	3	Ja'Michael Brown	6 ft 1 in (1.85 m)	180 lb (82 kg)	So	Pro-Vision Academy	Raceland, LA
G	4	Keith Frazier (I) (redshirt)	6 ft 5 in (1.96 m)	190 lb (86 kg)	Sr	Kimball HS; SMU	Dallas, TX
G	5	Allante Holston	6 ft 7 in (2.01 m)	190 lb (86 kg)	So	Clinton Christian School	Capitol Heights, MD
G	10	Deckie Johnson	6 ft 4 in (1.93 m)	180 lb (82 kg)	Sr	Southwind HS; Angelina College	Memphis, TN
F	11	Derail Green	6 ft 7 in (2.01 m)	220 lb (100 kg)	RS Sr	Klein Forest; Incarnate Word	Houston, TX
G	12	A. J. Lawson	6 ft 5 in (1.96 m)	190 lb (86 kg)	Fr	Bryan HS	Bryan, TX
F	14	Bryce Jackson (W)	6 ft 6 in (1.98 m)	203 lb (92 kg)	Jr	Fossil Ridge HS; New Orleans	Keller, TX
F	22	Khalil Fuller	6 ft 8 in (2.03 m)	260 lb (118 kg)	So	Rancho Verde HS	Moreno Valley, CA
C	23	Rickey Brice, Jr.	7 ft 1 in (2.16 m)	270 lb (122 kg)	So	Pantego Christian HS	Arlington, TX
G	24	Jacob Gross (W)	6 ft 4 in (1.93 m)	191 lb (87 kg)	RS Jr	Sachse HS	Sachse, TX
F	50	Shane Temara	6 ft 9 in (2.06 m)	225 lb (102 kg)	Jr	West Genesee HS; Angelina College	Syracuse, NY
G	52	J-Mychal Reese	6 ft 2 in (1.88 m)	185 lb (84 kg)	RS Jr	Bryan HS; Texas A&M	Bryan, TX
G	55	D. J. Draper (W)	5 ft 10 in (1.78 m)	155 lb (70 kg)	RS Fr	Birdville HS	Beford, TX

Head coach

- Tony Benford (Texas Tech)

Assistant coach(es)

- Rob Evans (New Mexico State)
- Dan O'Dowd (Bethany (WV))
- David Anwar (Fitchburg State)

Legend

- (C) Team captain
- (S) Suspended
- (I) Ineligible
- (W) Walk-on
- Injured
- Current redshirt

Roster

== Schedule and results ==
Date time, TV	Rank^{#}	Opponent^{#}	Result	Record	Site (attendance) city, state
Non-conference regular season
November 11, 2016*; 7:00 pm, AFN		Sul Ross State	W 85–77	1–0	The Super Pit (1,226); Denton, TX
November 15, 2016*; 6:30 pm, FSSW+		at Texas Tech	L 43–70	1–1	United Supermarkets Arena (9,534); Luboock, TX
November 20, 2016*; 1:00 pm, AFN		Drexel; Scarlet Knight Showcase	L 62–83	1–2	The Super Pit (1,457); Denton, TX
November 23, 2016*; 6:30 pm, BTN+		at Rutgers; Scarlet Knight Showcase	L 53–66	1–3	Louis Brown Athletic Center (3,351); Piscataway, NJ
November 25, 2016*; 7:00 pm		Niagara; Scarlet Knight Showcase	W 80–71	2–3	The Super Pit (1,411); Denton, TX
November 27, 2016*; 1:00 pm		Hartford; Scarlet Knight Showcase	W 81–78	3–3	The Super Pit (1,566); Denton, TX
November 30, 2016*; 11:30 am		Texas College	W 73–45	4–3	The Super Pit (2,006); Denton, TX
December 3, 2016*; 2:00 pm		Texas–Arlington	L 61–77	4–4	The Super Pit (2,386); Denton, TX
December 8, 2016*; 7:00 pm		Delaware State	W 73–40	5–4	The Super Pit (1,707); Denton, TX
December 17, 2016*; 6:30 pm		at Sam Houston State	W 71–65	5–5	Bernard Johnson Coliseum (763); Huntsville, TX
December 20, 2016*; 7:00 pm		Southeastern Louisiana	W 71–65	6–5	The Super Pit (1,707); Denton, TX
December 22, 2016*; 7:00 pm		San Diego	L 68–69	6–6	The Super Pit (2,717); Denton, TX
Conference USA regular season
December 31, 2016; 11:00 am		at Charlotte	L 76–101	6–7 (0–1)	Dale F. Halton Arena (3,792); Charlotte, NC
January 2, 2017; 4:00 pm		at Old Dominion	L 48–55	6–8 (0–2)	Ted Constant Convocation Center (5,123); Norfolk, VA
January 5, 2017; 7:00 pm, ESPN3		UAB	L 52–54	6–9 (0–3)	The Super Pit (1,603); Denton, TX
January 7, 2017; 2:00 pm		Middle Tennessee	L 68–79	6–10 (0–4)	The Super Pit (2,263); Denton, TX
January 14, 2017; 2:00 pm		at Rice	L 79–101	6–11 (0–5)	Tudor Fieldhouse (2,749); Houston, TX
January 19, 2017; 7:00 pm		at Southern Miss	L 65–75	6–12 (0–6)	Reed Green Coliseum (2,285); Hattiesburg, MS
January 21, 2017; 6:00 pm		at Louisiana Tech	L 57–81	6–13 (0–7)	Thomas Assembly Center (3,066); Ruston, LA
January 26, 2017; 7:00 pm		Charlotte	L 81–82	6–14 (0–8)	The Super Pit (2,006); Denton, TX
January 28, 2017; 2:00 pm		Old Dominion	L 67–73	6–15 (0–9)	The Super Pit (1,647); Denton, TX
February 4, 2017; 2:00 pm		Rice	L 80–95	6–16 (0–10)	The Super Pit (2,154); Denton, TX
February 9, 2017; 6:00 pm		at Florida Atlantic	W 70–64	7–16 (1–10)	FAU Arena (1,330); Boca Raton, FL
February 11, 2017; 6:00 pm		at FIU	L 71–90	7–17 (1–11)	FIU Arena (877); Miami, FL
February 16, 2017; 7:00 pm, beIN		UTEP	L 71–77 ^{OT}	7–18 (1–12)	The Super Pit (2,672); Denton, TX
February 18, 2017; 2:00 pm		UTSA	W 83–73	8–18 (2–12)	The Super Pit (3,384); Denton, TX
February 23, 2017; 7:00 pm		Louisiana Tech	L 67–85	8–19 (2–13)	The Super Pit (2,217); Denton, TX
February 25, 2017; 2:00 pm		Southern Miss	L 53–76	8–20 (2–14)	The Super Pit (3,360); Denton, TX
March 2, 2017; 6:00 pm		at WKU	L 63–74	8–21 (2–15)	E. A. Diddle Arena (3,676); Bowling Green, KY
March 4, 2017; 6:00 pm		at Marshall	L 104–106	8–22 (2–16)	Cam Henderson Center (6,017); Huntington, WV
*Non-conference game. (#) Tournament seedings in parentheses. All times are in Central Time.

== See also ==
- 2016–17 North Texas Mean Green women's basketball team
