= 2016–17 UAB Blazers men's basketball team =

American college basketball season

2016–17 UAB Blazers men's basketball
- Conference: Conference USA
- Record: 17–16 (9–9 C-USA)
- Head coach: Robert Ehsan (1st season)
- Assistant coaches: Turner Battle; Dannton Jackson; Kevin Devitt
- Home arena: Bartow Arena

2016–17 Conference USA men's basketball standings
	Conf.				Overall
Team	W		L	PCT	W		L	PCT
Middle Tennessee †	17	–	1	.944	31	–	5	.861
Louisiana Tech	14	–	4	.778	23	–	10	.697
Old Dominion	12	–	6	.667	19	–	12	.613
UTEP	12	–	6	.667	15	–	17	.469
Rice	11	–	7	.611	23	–	12	.657
Marshall	10	–	8	.556	20	–	15	.571
UAB	9	–	9	.500	17	–	16	.515
Western Kentucky	9	–	9	.500	15	–	17	.469
UTSA	8	–	10	.444	14	–	19	.424
Charlotte	7	–	11	.389	13	–	17	.433
Florida Atlantic	6	–	12	.333	10	–	20	.333
Southern Miss	6	–	12	.333	9	–	22	.290
FIU	3	–	15	.167	7	–	24	.226
North Texas	2	–	16	.111	8	–	22	.267
† 2017 C-USA Tournament winner

The 2016–17 UAB Blazers basketball team represented the University of Alabama at Birmingham during the 2016–17 NCAA Division I men's basketball season. The Blazers, led by first-year head coach Robert Ehsan, played their home games at the Bartow Arena as members of Conference USA. They finished the season 17–16, 9–9 in C-USA play to finish in a tie for seventh place. They defeated Charlotte in the first round of the C-USA tournament before losing to Louisiana Tech.

== Previous season ==
The Blazers finished the 2015–16 season 26–7, 16–2 in C-USA play to win the regular season championship. They lost in the quarterfinals of the C-USA tournament to WKU. As a regular season conference champion who failed to win their conference tournament, they received an automatic bid to the National Invitation Tournament where they lost in the first round to BYU.

Following the season, head coach Jerod Haase left UAB to accept the head coaching position at Stanford. On April 4, 2016, the school hired Robert Ehsan, who had been an assistant under Haase at UAB, as head coach .

== Preseason ==
The Blazers were picked to finish in first place in the preseason Conference USA poll. Chris Cokley and William Lee were selected to the preseason All-Conference USA team.

== Departures ==
Name	Number	Pos.	Height	Weight	Year	Hometown	Previous School
Robert Brown	4	G	6'5"	195	Senior	Clermont, FL	Graduated
Lionel Love	45	G	6'3"	165	Sophomore	Huntsville, AL	Walk-on; left the team for personal reasons

== Incoming recruits ==
College recruiting information
Name	Hometown	School	Height	Weight	Commit date
Nate Darling; SG	Hyattsville, Maryland	DeMatha Catholic HS	6 ft 4 in (1.93 m)	180 lb (82 kg)	
Nate Darling; SG	Recruit ratings: Scout: Rivals: (65)				
Javien Williams; SG	Birmingham, Alabama	Woodlawn HS	6 ft 4 in (1.93 m)	175 lb (79 kg)	
Javien Williams; SG	Recruit ratings: Scout: Rivals: (NR)				
Overall recruit ranking:
Note: In many cases, Scout, Rivals, 247Sports, On3, and ESPN may conflict in their listings of height and weight.; In these cases, the average was taken. ESPN grades are on a 100-point scale.; Sources: "2016 Team Ranking". Rivals.

== Roster ==
2016–17 UAB Blazers men's basketball team
Players
Coaches

Pos.	#	Name	Height	Weight	Year	Previous school	Hometown
G	0	Hakeem Baxter	6 ft 2 in (1.88 m)	186 lb (84 kg)	Sr	Maryland Eastern Shore	Philadelphia, Pennsylvania
G	1	Denzell Watts	6 ft 2 in (1.88 m)	235 lb (107 kg)	Sr	Carman-Ainsworth High School	Flint, Michigan
G	2	Nick Norton	5 ft 10 in (1.78 m)	168 lb (76 kg)	Jr	Central Catholic High School	Bloomington, Illinois
F	3	Chris Cokley	6 ft 8 in (2.03 m)	229 lb (104 kg)	Jr	Savannah High School	Savannah, Georgia
G	5	Deion Lavender	6 ft 4 in (1.93 m)	192 lb (87 kg)	RS So	Southern Illinois	Alton, Illinois
G	10	Javien Williams	6 ft 4 in (1.93 m)	175 lb (79 kg)	Fr	Woodlawn High School	Birmingham, Alabama
G	11	Dirk Williams	6 ft 5 in (1.96 m)	178 lb (81 kg)	Sr	Tallahassee Community College	Homewood, Alabama
G	13	Nate Darling	6 ft 4 in (1.93 m)	185 lb (84 kg)	Fr	DeMatha Catholic High School	Halifax, Nova Scotia
F	21	Tosin Mehinti	6 ft 9 in (2.06 m)	244 lb (111 kg)	Sr	Greenforest McCalep Christian Academy	Lagos, Nigeria
G	22	Tyler Madison	6 ft 4 in (1.93 m)	222 lb (101 kg)	Sr	Shelby County High School	Columbiana, Alabama
F	33	Thomas Smallwood	7 ft 0 in (2.13 m)	240 lb (109 kg)	So	Lycée Général Saint John Perse	Bordeaux, France
F	34	William Lee	6 ft 9 in (2.06 m)	209 lb (95 kg)	Jr	Dallas County High School	Plantersville, Alabama
F	35	Lewis Sullivan	6 ft 7 in (2.01 m)	222 lb (101 kg)	Jr	Hazel Green High School	Hazel Green, Alabama

Head coach

- Robert Ehsan (UC Davis)

Assistant coach(es)

- Turner Battle (Buffalo)
- Dannton Jackson (Xavier (LA))
- Kevin Devitt (DePaul)

Legend

- (C) Team captain
- (S) Suspended
- (I) Ineligible
- (W) Walk-on
- Injured
- Current redshirt

Roster

== Schedule and results ==
Date time, TV	Rank^{#}	Opponent^{#}	Result	Record	Site (attendance) city, state
Exhibition
November 3*; 7:30 pm		Lindenwood	W 92–69		Bartow Arena; Birmingham, AL
Non-conference regular season
November 11*; 7:00 pm		Arkansas–Pine Bluff; CBE Hall of Fame Classic	W 86–66	1–0	Bartow Arena (4,289); Birmingham, AL
November 14*; 7:00 pm		Furman; CBE Hall of Fame Classic	L 74–84	1–1	Bartow Arena (3,682); Birmingham, AL
November 17*; 7:00 pm		Troy	W 74–51	2–1	Bartow Arena (4,656); Birmingham, AL
November 21*; 8:30 pm, ESPN2		vs. No. 5 Kansas; CBE Hall of Fame Classic semifinals	L 63–83	2–2	Sprint Center (10,071); Kansas City, MO
November 22*; 6:30 pm, ESPN3		vs. George Washington; CBE Hall of Fame Classic 3rd place game	W 81–74	3–2	Sprint Center (3,527); Kansas City, MO
November 27*; 4:00 pm		vs. No. 15 Saint Mary's	L 63–76	3–3	Orleans Arena (862); Las Vegas, NV
November 29*; 7:00 pm		Alabama A&M	W 75–45	4–3	Bartow Arena (3,719); Birmingham, AL
December 3*; 7:30 pm, beIN		Auburn; Rivalry	L 70–74	4–4	Bartow Arena (8,728); Birmingham, AL
December 7*; 7:00 pm, ESPN3		at Stephen F. Austin	W 84–73	5–4	William R. Johnson Coliseum (3,650); Nacogdoches, TX
December 10*; 12:00 pm, ESPN3		at Memphis	L 55–62	5–5	FedEx Forum (9,424); Memphis, TN
December 18*; 4:00 pm		Southern	W 75–74 ^{OT}	6–5	Bartow Arena (3,436); Birmingham, AL
December 21*; 7:00 pm, LHN		at Texas	L 60–96	6–6	Frank Erwin Center (9,106); Austin, TX
December 28*; 5:00 pm		Miles College	W 98–66	7–6	Bartow Arena (3,572); Birmingham, AL
Conference USA regular season
January 1; 3:00 pm, CI		at Middle Tennessee	L 49–60	7–7 (0–1)	Murphy Center (4,227); Murfreesboro, TN
January 5; 7:00 pm, ESPN3		at North Texas	W 54–52	8–7 (1–1)	The Super Pit (1,603); Denton, TX
January 7; 7:00 pm		at Rice	W 88–81 ^{OT}	9–7 (2–1)	Tudor Fieldhouse (2,001); Houston, TX
January 12; 7:00 pm, CI		WKU	W 72–54	10–7 (3–1)	Bartow Arena (3,745); Birmingham, AL
January 14; 1:00 pm		Marshall	W 94–78	11–7 (4–1)	Bartow Arena (3,275); Birmingham, AL
January 19; 7:00 pm, beIN		at Florida Atlantic	W 80–78	12–7 (5–1)	FAU Arena (1,706); Boca Raton, FL
January 21; 6:00 pm		at FIU	L 85–94	12–8 (5–2)	FIU Arena (1,263); Miami, FL
January 26; 8:00 pm, ASN		Louisiana Tech	W 79–70	13–8 (6–2)	Bartow Arena (3,642); Birmingham, AL
January 28; 7:00 pm		Southern Miss	W 87–43	14–8 (7–2)	Bartow Arena (4,915); Birmingham, AL
February 2; 9:00 pm, CBSSN		at UTEP	L 59–63	14–9 (7–3)	Don Haskins Center (6,248); El Paso, TX
February 4; 3:00 pm		at UTSA	L 67–82	14–10 (7–4)	Convocation Center (1,145); San Antonio, TX
February 9; 7:00 pm, CI		Charlotte	W 82–69	15–10 (8–4)	Bartow Arena (3,841); Birmingham, AL
February 11; 7:00 pm, ASN		Old Dominion; Bartow Classic	L 62–83	15–11 (8–5)	Bartow Arena (4,185); Birmingham, AL
February 16; 6:00 pm, CBSSN		at Marshall	L 59–74	15–12 (8–6)	Cam Henderson Center (5,637); Huntington, WV
February 18; 1:00 pm, CBSSN		at WKU	L 64–76	15–13 (8–7)	E. A. Diddle Arena (3,553); Bowling Green, KY
February 26; 12:00 pm, CBSSN		Middle Tennessee	L 64–66	15–14 (8–8)	Bartow Arena (3,371); Birmingham, AL
March 2; 7:00 pm		Florida Atlantic	W 79–59	16–14 (9–8)	Bartow Arena (3,209); Birmingham, AL
March 4; 7:00 pm		FIU	L 56–68	16–15 (9–9)	Bartow Arena (3,881); Birmingham, AL
Conference USA tournament
March 8; 5:30 pm, CI	(7)	vs. (10) Charlotte; First round	W 74–73	17–15	Legacy Arena (6,410); Birmingham, AL
March 9; 5:30 pm, ASN	(7)	(2) Louisiana Tech; Quarterfinals	L 57–69	17–16	Legacy Arena (4,005); Birmingham, AL
*Non-conference game. (#) Tournament seedings in parentheses. All times are in Eastern Time.
