= 2016–17 Southern Miss Golden Eagles basketball team =

American college basketball season

2016–17 Southern Miss Golden Eagles basketball
- Conference: Conference USA
- Record: 9–22 (6–12 C-USA)
- Head coach: Doc Sadler (3rd season)
- Assistant coaches: Clarence Weatherspoon; Marques Townsend; Chris Croft
- Home arena: Reed Green Coliseum

2016–17 Conference USA men's basketball standings
	Conf.				Overall
Team	W		L	PCT	W		L	PCT
Middle Tennessee †	17	–	1	.944	31	–	5	.861
Louisiana Tech	14	–	4	.778	23	–	10	.697
Old Dominion	12	–	6	.667	19	–	12	.613
UTEP	12	–	6	.667	15	–	17	.469
Rice	11	–	7	.611	23	–	12	.657
Marshall	10	–	8	.556	20	–	15	.571
UAB	9	–	9	.500	17	–	16	.515
Western Kentucky	9	–	9	.500	15	–	17	.469
UTSA	8	–	10	.444	14	–	19	.424
Charlotte	7	–	11	.389	13	–	17	.433
Florida Atlantic	6	–	12	.333	10	–	20	.333
Southern Miss	6	–	12	.333	9	–	22	.290
FIU	3	–	15	.167	7	–	24	.226
North Texas	2	–	16	.111	8	–	22	.267
† 2017 C-USA Tournament winner

The 2016–17 Southern Miss Golden Eagles men's basketball team represented the University of Southern Mississippi during the 2016–17 NCAA Division I men's basketball season. The Golden Eagles, led by third-year head coach Doc Sadler, played their home games at Reed Green Coliseum in Hattiesburg, Mississippi and were members of Conference USA. They finished the season 9–22, 6–12 in C-USA play to finish in 12th place. They lost in the first round of the C-USA tournament to Rice.

== Previous season ==
The Golden Eagles finished the 2015–16 season 8–21, 5–13 in C-USA play to finish in a tie for 12th place. Due to an ongoing NCAA investigation into NCAA violations and illegal benefits for players under former coach Donnie Tyndall, they self-imposed a postseason ban for the second consecutive year, which included the C-USA tournament.

== Preseason ==
The Golden Eagles were picked to finish in 13th place in the preseason Conference USA poll.

== Departures ==
Name	Number	Pos.	Height	Weight	Year	Hometown	Notes
Kourtlin Jackson	2	G	6'4"	190	RS Senior	Des Moines, IA	Graduated
Keljin Blevins	10	G	6'4"	200	Sophomore	Hot Springs, AR	Transferred to Montana State
Michael O'Donnell	14	F	6'6"	188	Senior	Chicago, IL	Graduated
Norville Carey	21	F	6'7"	228	Senior	British Virgin Islands	Walk-on; graduate transferred to Rider
Jamie Champman	25	G	6'3"	190	Senior	Mobile, AL	Walk-on; graduated

=== Incoming transfers ===
Name	Number	Pos.	Height	Weight	Year	Hometown	Previous School
Marcus Cooper	25	G	6'4"	195	Junior	Van Nuys, CA	Junior college transferred from Northeastern Junior College.
Dominic Magee	54	G	6'4"	180	RS Sophomore	Harvey, LA	Transferred from Grand Canyon. Under NCAA transfer rules, Magee will have to sit out for the 2016–17 season. Will have three years of remaining eligibility.
Tyree Griffin	55	G	5'10"	165	Junior	New Orleans, LA	Transferred from Oklahoma State. Under NCAA transfer rules, Griffin will have to sit out for the 2016–17 season. Will have two years of remaining eligibility.

== Recruiting class of 2016 ==
College recruiting
Name	Hometown	School	Height	Weight	Commit date
Josh Conley; SF	Sylmar, CA	Moravian Prep	6 ft 6 in (1.98 m)	180 lb (82 kg)	Jul 16, 2016
Josh Conley; SF	Recruit ratings: Scout: Rivals: (POST)				
Overall recruit ranking:
Note: In many cases, Scout, Rivals, 247Sports, On3, and ESPN may conflict in their listings of height and weight.; In these cases, the average was taken. ESPN grades are on a 100-point scale.; Sources: "2016 Team Ranking". Rivals.

== Roster ==
2016–17 Southern Miss Golden Eagles men's basketball team
Players
Coaches

Pos.	#	Name	Height	Weight	Year	Previous school	Hometown
F	0	Raheem Watts	6 ft 7 in (2.01 m)	216 lb (98 kg)	Sr	Dodge City Community College	Greenville, South Carolina
G	1	Cortez Edwards	6 ft 2 in (1.88 m)	170 lb (77 kg)	So	Osceola High School	Kissimmee, Florida
G	2	D'Angelo Richardson	5 ft 9 in (1.75 m)	168 lb (76 kg)	Jr	Holmes Community College	Vicksburg, Mississippi
G	3	Robert Thomas III	6 ft 0 in (1.83 m)	185 lb (84 kg)	So	Permian High School	Odessa, Texas
G	4	Christian Clark (W)	6 ft 0 in (1.83 m)	175 lb (79 kg)	RS Fr	Mack Prep Academy	Hattiesburg, Mississippi
G	5	Khari Price	5 ft 9 in (1.75 m)	170 lb (77 kg)	RS Sr	Dayton	Slidell, Louisiana
G	10	Josh Conley	6 ft 7 in (2.01 m)	185 lb (84 kg)	Fr	Sound Doctrine Christian Academy	Inglewood, California
G	11	Michael Ramey	6 ft 5 in (1.96 m)	183 lb (83 kg)	RS Sr	Seminole State College	Indianapolis, Indiana
F	12	Tim Rowe	6 ft 11 in (2.11 m)	220 lb (100 kg)	So	Mt. Zion Prep	Lilburn, Georgia
G	13	Bilal Abdur-Rahim	6 ft 7 in (2.01 m)	200 lb (91 kg)	So	Colby Community College	Marietta, Georgia
F	15	Eddie Davis III (W)	6 ft 7 in (2.01 m)	248 lb (112 kg)	RS So	Centennial High School	Las Vegas, Nevada
G	20	Kevin Holland	6 ft 1 in (1.85 m)	175 lb (79 kg)	RS So	Paul W. Bryant High School	Tuscaloosa, Alabama
G	21	Anfernee Hampton	6 ft 5 in (1.96 m)	170 lb (77 kg)	Jr	Mississippi Gulf Coast Community College	Jackson, Mississippi
G/F	22	Quinton Campbell	6 ft 7 in (2.01 m)	192 lb (87 kg)	RS Sr	East Central Community College	Wilmer, Alabama
G	30	Clay Weatherspoon (W)	6 ft 2 in (1.88 m)	195 lb (88 kg)	Fr	Ridgeland High School (MS)	Jackson, Mississippi
G	54	Dominic Magee (I) (redshirt)	6 ft 4 in (1.93 m)	190 lb (86 kg)	RS So	Grand Canyon	Harvey, Louisiana
G	55	Tyree Griffin (I) (redshirt)	5 ft 10 in (1.78 m)	165 lb (75 kg)	Jr	Oklahoma State	New Orleans, Louisiana

Head coach

- Doc Sadler (Auburn)

Assistant coach(es)

- Clarence Weatherspoon (Southern Miss)
- Marques Townsend (Kansas)
- Chris Croft (Southern Miss)

Legend

- (C) Team captain
- (S) Suspended
- (I) Ineligible
- (W) Walk-on
- Injured
- Current redshirt

Roster

== Schedule and results ==
Date time, TV	Rank^{#}	Opponent^{#}	Result	Record	Site (attendance) city, state
Exhibition
11/03/2016*; 7:00 pm		Mississippi College	W 96–95 ^{2OT}		Reed Green Coliseum; Hattiesburg, MS
11/07/2016*; 7:00 pm		William Carey	W 79–60		Reed Green Coliseum; Hattiesburg, MS
Non-conference regular season
11/11/2016*; 7:00 pm		Tougaloo	W 101–96 ^{2OT}	1–0	Reed Green Coliseum (2,569); Hattiesburg, MS
11/15/2016*; 7:00 pm		at LSU	L 61–78	1–1	Maravich Center (6,942); Baton Rouge, LA
11/18/2016*; 7:00 pm		Union (TN)	W 60–44	2–1	Reed Green Coliseum (2,513); Hattiesburg, MS
11/21/2016*; 7:00 pm		Alabama A&M	W 63–55	3–1	Reed Green Coliseum (2,202); Hattiesburg, MS
11/30/2016*; 7:00 pm		South Alabama	L 55–78	3–2	Reed Green Coliseum (2,333); Hattiesburg, MS
12/04/2016*; 3:30 pm		at Jackson State	L 64–75	3–3	Williams Assembly Center; Jackson, MS
12/06/2016*; 6:00 pm, ACCN Extra		at Florida State	L 49–98	3–4	Donald L. Tucker Center (5,116); Jackson, MS
12/10/2016*; 4:30 pm		Tulane	L 64–71	3–5	Reed Green Coliseum (3,609); Hattiesburg, MS
12/19/2016*; 8:00 pm, ESPNU		vs. Mississippi State	L 44–86	3–6	Mississippi Coliseum (4,301); Jackson, MS
12/22/2016*; 6:00 pm, ESPN2		vs. San Diego State; Diamond Head Classic quarterfinals	L 51–66	3–7	Stan Sheriff Center (5,942); Honolulu, HI
12/23/2016*; 6:00 pm, ESPN3		vs. Stephen F. Austin; Diamond Head Classic consolation 2nd round	L 64–67	3–8	Stan Sheriff Center (5,873); Honolulu, HI
12/25/2016*; 1:30 pm, ESPNU		at Hawaii; Diamond Head Classic 7th place game	L 46–60	3–9	Stan Sheriff Center (5,769); Honolulu, HI
Conference USA regular season
01/01/2017; 2:00 pm		Louisiana Tech	L 55–79	3–10 (0–1)	Reed Green Coliseum (2,761); Hattiesburg, MS
01/05/2017; 7:00 pm		UTSA	W 77–59	4–10 (1–1)	Reed Green Coliseum (2,126); Hattiesburg, MS
01/07/2017; 4:00 pm		UTEP	W 73–65	5–10 (2–1)	Reed Green Coliseum (2,161); Hattiesburg, MS
01/12/2017; 6:00 pm		at Old Dominion	L 50–54	5–11 (2–2)	Ted Constant Convocation Center (6,523); Norfolk, VA
01/14/2017; 6:00 pm, CI		at Charlotte	L 66–82	5–12 (2–3)	Dale F. Halton Arena (4,457); Charlotte, NC
01/19/2017; 7:00 pm		North Texas	W 75–65	6–12 (3–3)	Reed Green Coliseum (2,285); Hattiesburg, MS
01/21/2017; 4:00 pm		Rice	L 58–61	6–13 (3–4)	Reed Green Coliseum (2,366); Hattiesburg, MS
01/26/2017; 6:30 pm, ESPN3		at Middle Tennessee	L 56–72	6–14 (3–5)	Murphy Center (5,498); Murfreesboro, TN
01/28/2017; 7:00 pm		at UAB	L 43–87	6–15 (3–6)	Bartow Arena (4,915); Birmingham, AL
02/02/2017; 7:00 pm		Marshall	W 91–76	7–15 (4–6)	Reed Green Coliseum (2,373); Hattiesburg, MS
02/04/2017; 4:00 pm		WKU	L 47–64	7–16 (4–7)	Reed Green Coliseum (2,946); Hattiesburg, MS
02/09/2017; 7:00 pm		at UTSA	L 51–57	7–17 (4–8)	Convocation Center (1,189); San Antonio, TX
02/11/2017; 8:00 pm		at UTEP	L 50–80	7–18 (4–9)	Don Haskins Center (6,930); El Paso, TX
02/16/2017; 7:00 pm		FIU	W 69-66 ^{OT}	8–18 (5–9)	Reed Green Coliseum (3,494); Hattiesburg, MS
02/18/2017; 4:00 pm		Florida Atlantic	W 94–82	8–19 (5–10)	Reed Green Coliseum (4,137); Hattiesburg, MS
02/23/2017; 7:00 pm		at Rice	L 71–72	8–20 (5–11)	Tudor Fieldhouse (1,589); Houston, TX
02/25/2017; 2:00 pm		at North Texas	W 76–53	9–20 (6–11)	The Super Pit (3,360); Denton, TX
03/04/2017; 1:00 pm		at Louisiana Tech	L 65–93	9–21 (6–12)	Thomas Assembly Center (3,102); Ruston, LA
Conference USA tournament
03/08/2017; 2:00 pm, CI	(12)	vs. (5) Rice; First round	L 75–86	9–22	Legacy Arena (3,207); Birmingham, AL
*Non-conference game. ^{#}Rankings from AP Poll. (#) Tournament seedings in parentheses. All times are in Central Time Source.
