= 2016–17 Middle Tennessee Blue Raiders men's basketball team =

American college basketball season

2016–17 Middle Tennessee Blue Raiders men's basketball

C-USA regular season & tournament champions Challenge in Music City champions

NCAA tournament, Second Round
- Conference: Conference USA
- Record: 31–5 (17–1 C-USA)
- Head coach: Kermit Davis (15th season)
- Assistant coaches: Greg Grensing; Win Case; Ronnie Hamilton
- Home arena: Murphy Center

2016–17 Conference USA men's basketball standings
	Conf.				Overall
Team	W		L	PCT	W		L	PCT
Middle Tennessee †	17	–	1	.944	31	–	5	.861
Louisiana Tech	14	–	4	.778	23	–	10	.697
Old Dominion	12	–	6	.667	19	–	12	.613
UTEP	12	–	6	.667	15	–	17	.469
Rice	11	–	7	.611	23	–	12	.657
Marshall	10	–	8	.556	20	–	15	.571
UAB	9	–	9	.500	17	–	16	.515
Western Kentucky	9	–	9	.500	15	–	17	.469
UTSA	8	–	10	.444	14	–	19	.424
Charlotte	7	–	11	.389	13	–	17	.433
Florida Atlantic	6	–	12	.333	10	–	20	.333
Southern Miss	6	–	12	.333	9	–	22	.290
FIU	3	–	15	.167	7	–	24	.226
North Texas	2	–	16	.111	8	–	22	.267
† 2017 C-USA Tournament winner

The 2016–17 Middle Tennessee Blue Raiders men's basketball team represented Middle Tennessee State University during the 2016–17 NCAA Division I men's basketball season. The Blue Raiders, led by 15th-year head coach Kermit Davis, played their home games at the Murphy Center in Murfreesboro, Tennessee and were members of Conference USA. They finished the season 31–5, 17–1 in C-USA play to win the regular season championship. In the C-USA tournament, they defeated UTSA, UTEP, and Marshall to win the C-USA Tournament. As a result, they received the conference's automatic bid to the NCAA tournament. As the No. 12 seed in the South region, they defeated Minnesota in the first round before losing in the second round to Butler.

== Previous season ==
The Blue Raiders finished the 2015–16 season 25–10, 13–5 in C-USA play to finish in second place. They defeated Charlotte, Marshall, and Old Dominion to win the C-USA tournament. As a result, they earned the conference's automatic bid to the NCAA tournament. As a No. 15 seed in the Tournament, they upset No. 2 seed and No. 2-ranked Michigan State in the first round to become only the eighth No. 15 seed to win an NCAA Tournament game. In the second round, they lost to eventual Final Four participant, Syracuse.

== Offseason ==
=== Departures ===
Name	Number	Pos.	Height	Weight	Year	Hometown	Notes
Darnell Harris	0	F	6'8"	231	Senior	Milwaukee, WI	Graduated
Perrin Buford	2	G/F	6'6"	220	Senior	Decatur, AL	Graduated
Joshua Phillips	3	F	6'8"	230	Junior	Hendersonville, TN	Left the team for personal reasons
Jacob Ivory	5	G	5'9"	168	Sophomore	Jackson, MS	Left the team for personal reasons
Jaquawn Raymond	10	G	6'4"	200	RS senior	Statesboro, GA	Graduated

=== Incoming transfers ===
Name	Number	Pos.	Height	Weight	Year	Hometown	Previous school
Antwain Johnson	2	G	6'1"	185	Sophomore	Malone, FL	Junior college transferred from Chipola College.
Calvin Davis	10	G	6'1"	190	Junior	Charlotte, NC	Junior college transferred from Cape Fear CC.

=== Recruiting class of 2016 ===
College recruiting
Name	Hometown	School	Height	Weight	Commit date
Davion Thomas #51 PF	Columbus, GA	Northside High School	6 ft 8 in (2.03 m)	200 lb (91 kg)	Jan 11, 2016
Davion Thomas #51 PF	Recruit ratings: Scout: Rivals: (75)				
Tyrik Dixon; SG	Bentonville, AR	Southwest Christian Academy	6 ft 1 in (1.85 m)	175 lb (79 kg)	Apr 9, 2016
Tyrik Dixon; SG	Recruit ratings: Scout: Rivals: (NR)				
Overall recruit ranking:
Note: In many cases, Scout, Rivals, 247Sports, On3, and ESPN may conflict in their listings of height and weight.; In these cases, the average was taken. ESPN grades are on a 100-point scale.; Sources: "2016 Team Ranking". Rivals.

== Preseason ==
The Blue Raiders were picked to finish in second place in the preseason Conference USA poll. Giddy Potts and Reggie Upshaw Jr. were selected to the preseason All-Conference USA team.

== Roster ==
2016–17 Middle Tennessee Blue Raiders men's basketball team
Players
Coaches

Pos.	#	Name	Height	Weight	Year	Previous school	Hometown
G	0	Tyrik Dixon	6 ft 1 in (1.85 m)	183 lb (83 kg)	Fr	Southwest Christian Academy	Bentonville, AR
F	1	Brandon Walters	6 ft 10 in (2.08 m)	262 lb (119 kg)	RS Jr	Howard; Walters State CC	Chattanooga, TN
G	2	Antwain Johnson	6 ft 2 in (1.88 m)	194 lb (88 kg)	So	Malone	Greenwood, FL
F	4	Xavier Habersham	6 ft 6 in (1.98 m)	208 lb (94 kg)	RS Sr	East Laurens; Hill College	Dublin, GA
G	11	Edward Simpson, Jr.	6 ft 2 in (1.88 m)	195 lb (88 kg)	Jr	St. Martin	Ocean Springs, MS
G	14	Chase Miller (W)	6 ft 0 in (1.83 m)	178 lb (81 kg)	RS Fr	Shelton	Dallas, TX
G	20	Giddy Potts	6 ft 2 in (1.88 m)	217 lb (98 kg)	Jr	Athens	Athens, AL
F	22	JaCorey Williams	6 ft 8 in (2.03 m)	220 lb (100 kg)	RS Sr	Central Park Christian; Arkansas	Birmingham, AL
G	24	Quavius Copeland	6 ft 1 in (1.85 m)	178 lb (81 kg)	Jr	Southside; Gulf Coast State College	Greenville, SC
F	25	Karl Gamble	6 ft 9 in (2.06 m)	228 lb (103 kg)	So	A.C. Flora	Columbia, SC
F	30	Reggie Upshaw Jr.	6 ft 8 in (2.03 m)	228 lb (103 kg)	Sr	Baylor School	Chattanooga, TN
G	31	Stephen Strachan (W)	6 ft 2 in (1.88 m)	200 lb (91 kg)	RS Jr	The Potter's House Christian Academy; Moberly Area CC	Nassau, Bahamas
F	35	Davion Thomas	6 ft 9 in (2.06 m)	208 lb (94 kg)	RS Fr	Northside	Columbus, GA
G/F	45	Aldonis Foote	6 ft 5 in (1.96 m)	213 lb (97 kg)	Sr	Peoria; Trinity Valley CC	Peoria, IL

Head coach

- Kermit Davis (Purdue)

Assistant coach(es)

- Greg Grensing (Texas State)
- Win Case (Oklahoma City)
- Ronnie Hamilton (UNC Pembroke)

Legend

- (C) Team captain
- (S) Suspended
- (I) Ineligible
- (W) Walk-on
- Injured
- Current redshirt

Roster

== Schedule and results ==
Date time, TV	Rank^{#}	Opponent^{#}	Result	Record	Site (attendance) city, state
Exhibition
11/03/2016*; 7:30 pm		North Alabama	W 96–65		Murphy Center (1,830); Murfreesboro, TN
Non-conference regular season
11/11/2016*; 11:00 am		Milligan College	W 102–64	1–0	Murphy Center (6,020); Murfreesboro, TN
11/15/2016*; 6:30 pm		Murray State	W 87–81	2–0	Murphy Center (4,507); Murfreesboro, TN
11/19/2016*; 6:30 pm		Tennessee State	L 63–74	2–1	Murphy Center (4,830); Murfreesboro, TN
11/22/2016*; 6:30 pm		Toledo	W 80–70	3–1	Murphy Center (3,984); Murfreesboro, TN
11/25/2016*; 7:30 pm		vs. UNC Wilmington; Challenge in Music City	W 68–63	4–1	Nashville Municipal Auditorium (1200); Nashville, TN
11/26/2016*; 7:30 pm		vs. Toledo; Challenge in Music City	W 73–70 ^{OT}	5–1	Nashville Municipal Auditorium (850); Nashville, TN
11/27/2016*; 5:30 pm		vs. Evansville; Challenge in Music City	W 66–55	6–1	Nashville Municipal Auditorium (500); Nashville, TN
11/30/2016*; 7:00 pm		at Ole Miss	W 77–62	7–1	The Pavilion at Ole Miss (1000); Oxford, MS
12/03/2016*; 7:00 pm		at South Alabama	W 67–55	8–1	Mitchell Center (2,612); Mobile, AL
12/08/2016*; 6:30 pm, CBSSN		Vanderbilt	W 71–48	9–1	Murphy Center (9,606); Murfreesboro, TN
12/14/2016*; 7:00 pm		at Belmont	W 79–66	10–1	Curb Event Center (2,469); Nashville, TN
12/17/2016*; 6:00 pm, ASN		at VCU	L 77–80	10–2	Siegel Center (7,637); Richmond, VA
12/21/2016*; 6:30 pm		Georgia State	L 56–64	10–3	Murphy Center (4,502); Murfreesboro, TN
Conference USA regular season
01/01/2017; 3:00 pm, CI		UAB	W 60–49	11–3 (1–0)	Murphy Center (4,227); Murfreesboro, TN
01/05/2017; 7:00 pm, beIN		at Rice	W 80–77	12–3 (2–0)	Tudor Fieldhouse (1,513); Houston, TX
01/07/2017; 2:00 pm		at North Texas	W 79–68	13–3 (3–0)	The Super Pit (2,263); Denton, TX
01/12/2017; 7:00 pm, beIN		Marshall	W 69–57	14–3 (4–0)	Murphy Center (4,598); Murfreesboro, TN
01/14/2017; 7:00 pm, ASN		WKU	W 91–76	15–3 (5–0)	Murphy Center (6,806); Murfreesboro, TN
01/19/2017; 6:00 pm		at FIU	W 65–52	16–3 (6–0)	FIU Arena (1,401); Miami, FL
01/21/2017; 6:00 pm		at Florida Atlantic	W 86–57	17–3 (7–0)	FAU Arena (1,344); Boca Raton, FL
01/26/2017; 6:30 pm, ESPN3		Southern Miss	W 72–56	18–3 (8–0)	Murphy Center (5,498); Murfreesboro, TN
01/28/2017; 5:00 pm, ESPN3		Louisiana Tech	W 71–61	19–3 (9–0)	Murphy Center (7,805); Murfreesboro, TN
02/02/2017; 7:00 pm		at UTSA	W 69–59	20–3 (10–0)	Convocation Center (1,080); San Antonio, TX
02/04/2017; 8:00 pm, ASN		at UTEP	L 54–57	20–4 (10–1)	Don Haskins Center (6,803); El Paso, TX
02/09/2017; 7:00 pm, beIN		Old Dominion	W 64–51	21–4 (11–1)	Murphy Center (6,209); Murfreesboro, TN
02/11/2017; 5:00 pm, CI		Charlotte	W 70–55	22–4 (12–1)	Murphy Center (5,720); Murfreesboro, TN
02/16/2017; 8:00 pm, CBSSN		at WKU	W 78–52	23–4 (13–1)	E. A. Diddle Arena (4,385); Bowling Green, KY
02/18/2017; 5:00 pm, ASN		at Marshall	W 97–86	24–4 (14–1)	Cam Henderson Center (7,620); Huntington, WV
02/26/2017; 12:00 pm, CBSSN		at UAB	W 66–64	25–4 (15–1)	Bartow Arena (3,371); Birmingham, AL
03/02/2017; 6:30 pm, ESPN3		FIU	W 70–67	26–4 (16–1)	Murphy Center (5,510); Murfreesboro, TN
03/04/2017; 5:00 pm, ESPN3		Florida Atlantic	W 93–59	27–4 (17–1)	Murphy Center (8,806); Murfreesboro, TN
Conference USA tournament
03/09/2017; 11:30 am, ASN	(1)	vs. (9) UTSA; Quarterfinals	W 86–70	28–4	Legacy Arena (3,654); Birmingham, AL
03/10/2017; 11:30 am, CBSSN	(1)	vs. (4) UTEP; Semifinals	W 82–56	29–4	Legacy Arena (3,299); Birmingham, AL
03/11/2017; 7:30 pm, CBSSN	(1)	vs. (6) Marshall; Championship	W 83–72	30–4	Legacy Arena (3,956); Birmingham, AL
NCAA tournament
03/16/2017*; 3:00 pm, TNT	(12 S)	vs. (5 S) Minnesota; First Round	W 81–72	31–4	BMO Harris Bradley Center (17,303); Milwaukee, WI
03/18/2017*; 6:10 pm, TBS	(12 S)	vs. (4 S) No. 21 Butler; Second Round	L 65–74	31–5	BMO Harris Bradley Center (18,045); Milwaukee, WI
*Non-conference game. ^{#}Rankings from AP Poll. (#) Tournament seedings in parentheses. S=South Source. All times are in Central Time.

== Rankings ==
Ranking movements Legend: ██ Increase in ranking ██ Decrease in ranking — = Not ranked RV = Received votes
	Week																				
Poll	Pre	1	2	3	4	5	6	7	8	9	10	11	12	13	14	15	16	17	18	19	Final
AP	—	—	—	—	—	—	—	—	—	—	—	RV	RV	—	RV	RV	RV	RV	RV	RV	Not released
Coaches	—	—	—	—	—	—	—	—	—	—	RV	RV	RV	RV	RV	RV	RV	RV	25	25	RV

*AP does not release post-NCAA tournament rankings
