= 2016–17 UTSA Roadrunners men's basketball team =

American college basketball season

2016–17 UTSA Roadrunners men's basketball
- Conference: Conference USA
- Record: 14–19 (8–10 C-USA)
- Head coach: Steve Henson (1st season)
- Assistant coaches: Mike Peck; Scott Thompson; Adam Hood
- Home arena: Convocation Center

2016–17 Conference USA men's basketball standings
	Conf.				Overall
Team	W		L	PCT	W		L	PCT
Middle Tennessee †	17	–	1	.944	31	–	5	.861
Louisiana Tech	14	–	4	.778	23	–	10	.697
Old Dominion	12	–	6	.667	19	–	12	.613
UTEP	12	–	6	.667	15	–	17	.469
Rice	11	–	7	.611	23	–	12	.657
Marshall	10	–	8	.556	20	–	15	.571
UAB	9	–	9	.500	17	–	16	.515
Western Kentucky	9	–	9	.500	15	–	17	.469
UTSA	8	–	10	.444	14	–	19	.424
Charlotte	7	–	11	.389	13	–	17	.433
Florida Atlantic	6	–	12	.333	10	–	20	.333
Southern Miss	6	–	12	.333	9	–	22	.290
FIU	3	–	15	.167	7	–	24	.226
North Texas	2	–	16	.111	8	–	22	.267
† 2017 C-USA Tournament winner

The 2016–17 UTSA Roadrunners men's basketball team represented the University of Texas at San Antonio during the 2016–17 NCAA Division I men's basketball season. The Roadrunners, led by first-year head coach Steve Henson, played their home games at the Convocation Center and were members of Conference USA. They finished the season 14–19, 8–10 in C-USA play to finish in the ninth place. They defeated Western Kentucky in the first round of the C-USA tournament before losing to top-seeded Middle Tennessee.

== Previous season ==
The Roadrunners finished the season 5–27, 3–15 in C-USA play to finish in last place. They lost in the first round of the C-USA tournament to Florida Atlantic.

On March 10, 2016, after 10 years with the school, head coach Brooks Thompson was fired. He finished at UTSA with a record of 130–176. On April 1, the school hired Steve Henson as head coach.

== Offseason ==
=== Departures ===
Name	Number	Pos.	Height	Weight	Year	Hometown	Notes
George Matthews	1	G	6'6"	220	RS Senior	Phoenix, AZ	Graduated
Ömer Alp Aksu	5	G	6'2"	180	Freshman	Istanbul, Turkey	Transferred to Missouri S&T
Ryan Bowie	14	G	6'1"	185	Senior	Lewisville, TX	Graduated
Garrett Thibodeaux	22	F	6'8"	220	Freshman	Tyler, TX	Transferred to Howard College
Phillip Jones	24	F	6'6"	205	Junior	Freeport, Bahamas	Graduate transferred to Sam Houston State

=== Incoming transfers ===
Name	Number	Pos.	Height	Weight	Year	Hometown	Previous School
Bola Alade	14	G	6'4"	193	RS Sophomore	Plano, TX	Transferred from Oklahoma. Under NCAA transfer rules, Alade will have to sit out for the 2016–17 season. Will have three years of remaining eligibility.

=== Class of 2016 recruits ===
College recruiting information
Name	Hometown	School	Height	Weight	Commit date
Mitar Stanojevic; SF	Belgrade, Serbia	Creating Young Minds Academy	6 ft 7 in (2.01 m)	210 lb (95 kg)	May 2, 2016
Mitar Stanojevic; SF	Recruit ratings: Scout: Rivals: (NR)				
Byron Frohnen; SG	Las Vegas, NV	Bishop Gorman High School	6 ft 5 in (1.96 m)	210 lb (95 kg)	Apr 29, 2016
Byron Frohnen; SG	Recruit ratings: Scout: Rivals: (NR)				
George Wilborn III; SG	Chicago, IL	De La Salle High School	6 ft 3 in (1.91 m)	180 lb (82 kg)	Jun 16, 2016
George Wilborn III; SG	Recruit ratings: Scout: Rivals: (NR)				
Overall recruit ranking:
Note: In many cases, Scout, Rivals, 247Sports, On3, and ESPN may conflict in their listings of height and weight.; In these cases, the average was taken. ESPN grades are on a 100-point scale.; Sources: "2016 Team Ranking". Rivals.

== Preseason ==
The Roadrunners were picked to finish in last place in the preseason Conference USA poll.

== Roster ==
2016–17 UTSA Roadrunners men's basketball team
Players
Coaches

Pos.	#	Name	Height	Weight	Year	Previous school	Hometown
F	0	Terrell Scruggs (W)	6 ft 5 in (1.96 m)	195 lb (88 kg)	Sr	Grand View HS	Fresno, TX
F	1	Jeff Beverly (W)	6 ft 6 in (1.98 m)	250 lb (113 kg)	RS Jr	Clear Springs HS; Texas A&M–Corpus Christi/McLennan CC	League City, TX
G	2	J. R. Harris	6 ft 4 in (1.93 m)	170 lb (77 kg)	Sr	Southern Lab School; Indian Hills CC	Baton Rouge, LA
G	3	Gino Littles	6 ft 0 in (1.83 m)	160 lb (73 kg)	Jr	Desert Mountain HS	Phoenix, AZ
G	4	Kyle Massie (W)	5 ft 10 in (1.78 m)	160 lb (73 kg)	So	O'Connor HS	Helotes, TX
G	5	Giovanni De Nicolao	6 ft 3 in (1.91 m)	175 lb (79 kg)	Fr	I.I.S.I. Newton School	Camposampiero, Italy
G	10	Christian Wilson	6 ft 2 in (1.88 m)	170 lb (77 kg)	Jr	Notre Dame Prep	Baton Rouge, LA
G	11	Austin Karrer	6 ft 3 in (1.91 m)	180 lb (82 kg)	Jr	Canyon HS	New Braunfels, TX
G	13	Byron Frohnen	6 ft 5 in (1.96 m)	205 lb (93 kg)	Fr	Bishop Gorman HS	Las Vegas, NV
G	14	Bola Alade (I) (redshirt)	6 ft 4 in (1.93 m)	195 lb (88 kg)	RS So	John Paul II; Oklahoma	Plano, TX
C	15	Lucas O'Brien	6 ft 10 in (2.08 m)	245 lb (111 kg)	RS Sr	Perry HS	Chandler, AZ
G	20	George Willborn III	6 ft 3 in (1.91 m)	180 lb (82 kg)	Fr	De La Salle Institute	Chicago, IL
F	24	Mitar Stanojevic	6 ft 7 in (2.01 m)	210 lb (95 kg)	Fr	Creating Young Minds Academy	Belgrade, Serbia
F	25	Nick Allen	6 ft 8 in (2.03 m)	205 lb (93 kg)	So	Willow Canyon HS	Surprise, AZ
C	32	James Ringholt	6 ft 10 in (2.08 m)	230 lb (104 kg)	Jr	Brisbane Boys' College	Rockhampton, Australia
F	33	A. J. Cockrell	6 ft 8 in (2.03 m)	230 lb (104 kg)	So	Memorial HS	Tulsa, OK
G	34	Nick Billingsley	6 ft 4 in (1.93 m)	185 lb (84 kg)	Sr	New Mexico JC	Omaha, NE

Head coach

- Steve Henson (Kansas State)

Assistant coach(es)

- Mike Peck (Northwood)
- Scott Thompson (Mississippi)
- Adam Hood (Air Force)

Legend

- (C) Team captain
- (S) Suspended
- (I) Ineligible
- (W) Walk-on
- Injured
- Current redshirt

Roster

== Schedule and results ==
Date time, TV	Rank^{#}	Opponent^{#}	Result	Record	Site (attendance) city, state
Exhibition
11/07/2016*; 7:00 pm		Arkansas Tech	W 91–89		Convocation Center (1,215); San Antonio, TX
Non-conference regular season
11/11/2016*; 9:00 pm		at Fresno State	L 66–69	0–1	Save Mart Center (6,088); Fresno, CA
11/13/2016*; 4:00 pm, P12N		at Oregon State	L 64–72	0–2	Gill Coliseum (4,070); Corvallis, OR
11/16/2016*; 7:00 pm		at UIC	L 78–86	0–3	UIC Pavilion (3,571); Chicago, IL
11/19/2016*; 7:00 pm		Prairie View A&M	W 69–59	1–3	Convocation Center (1,065); San Antonio, TX
11/22/2016*; 7:00 pm, ESPN3		at Lamar	L 58–78	1–4	Montagne Center (1,865); Beaumont, TX
11/25/2016*; 7:30 pm		Texas State; I-35 Rivalry	W 63–48	2–4	Convocation Center (1,057); San Antonio, TX
12/01/2016*; 9:00 pm		Cal Poly	L 47–59	2–5	Convocation Center (1,050); San Antonio, TX
12/03/2016*; 8:30 pm		at Utah Valley	L 71–75	2–6	UCCU Center (1,676); Orem, UT
12/07/2016*; 8:00 pm, FSSW+		at Texas Tech	L 50–87	2–7	United Supermarkets Arena (6,444); Lubbock, TX
12/10/2016*; 3:00 pm		Southeastern Oklahoma State	W 88–69	3–7	Convocation Center (815); San Antonio, TX
12/18/2016*; 2:00 pm		at Texas A&M–Corpus Christi	L 69–73	3–8	American Bank Center (1,079); Corpus Christi, TX
12/21/2016*; 7:00 pm		Utah Valley	W 66–60	4–8	Convocation Center (753); San Antonio, TX
12/29/2016*; 7:00 pm		East Central Oklahoma	W 79–75	5–8	Convocation Center (713); San Antonio, TX
Conference USA regular season
01/01/2017; 3:00 pm		UTEP	W 67–55	6–8 (1–0)	Convocation Center (816); San Antonio, TX
01/05/2017; 7:00 pm		at Southern Miss	L 59–77	6–9 (1–1)	Reed Green Coliseum (2,126); Hattiesburg, MS
01/07/2017; 6:00 pm		at Louisiana Tech	W 69–68	7–9 (2–1)	Thomas Assembly Center (3,513); Ruston, LA
01/12/2017; 7:00 pm		Florida Atlantic	W 68–63	8–9 (3–1)	Convocation Center (1,417); San Antonio, TX
01/14/2017; 3:00 pm		FIU	W 57–55	9–9 (4–1)	Convocation Center (1,138); San Antonio, TX
01/21/2017; 8:00 pm		at UTEP	L 39–59	9–10 (4–2)	Don Haskins Center (6,446); El Paso, TX
01/26/2017; 6:00 pm		at Marshall	L 71–92	9–11 (4–3)	Cam Henderson Center (5,297); Huntington, WV
01/28/2017; 3:00 pm		at WKU	L 66–81	9–12 (4–4)	E. A. Diddle Arena (4,298); Bowling Green, KY
02/02/2017; 7:00 pm		Middle Tennessee	L 59–69	9–13 (4–5)	Convocation Center (1,080); San Antonio, TX
02/04/2017; 3:00 pm		UAB	W 82–67	10–13 (5–5)	Convocation Center (1,145); San Antonio, TX
02/09/2017; 7:00 pm		Southern Miss	W 57–51	11–13 (6–5)	Convocation Center (1,189); San Antonio, TX
02/11/2017; 3:00 pm		Louisiana Tech	L 66–72	11–14 (6–6)	Convocation Center (1,212); San Antonio, TX
02/16/2017; 7:00 pm		at Rice	L 68–80	11–15 (6–7)	Tudor Fieldhouse (1,713); Houston, TX
02/18/2017; 2:00 pm		at North Texas	L 73–83	11–16 (6–8)	The Super Pit (3,384); Denton, TX
02/23/2017; 6:00 pm		at FIU	W 69–67	12–16 (7–8)	FIU Arena (632); Miami, FL
02/25/2017; 6:00 pm		at Florida Atlantic	L 66–73	12–17 (7–9)	FAU Arena (1,674); Boca Raton, FL
03/02/2017; 7:00 pm		Charlotte	L 75–76	12–18 (7–10)	Convocation Center (1,006); San Antonio, TX
03/04/2017; 3:00 pm		Old Dominion	W 73–55	13–18 (8–10)	Convocation Center (2,650); San Antonio, TX
Conference USA tournament
03/08/2017; 11:30 am, CI	(9)	vs. (8) WKU; First round	W 56–52	14–18	Legacy Arena (3,207); Birmingham, AL
03/09/2017; 11:30 am, ASN	(9)	vs. (1) Middle Tennessee; Quarterfinals	L 70–86	14–19	Legacy Arena (3,654); Birmingham, AL
*Non-conference game. ^{#}Rankings from AP Poll. (#) Tournament seedings in parentheses. All times are in Central Time. Source
