= 2016–17 Charlotte 49ers men's basketball team =

American college basketball season

2016–17 Charlotte 49ers men's basketball
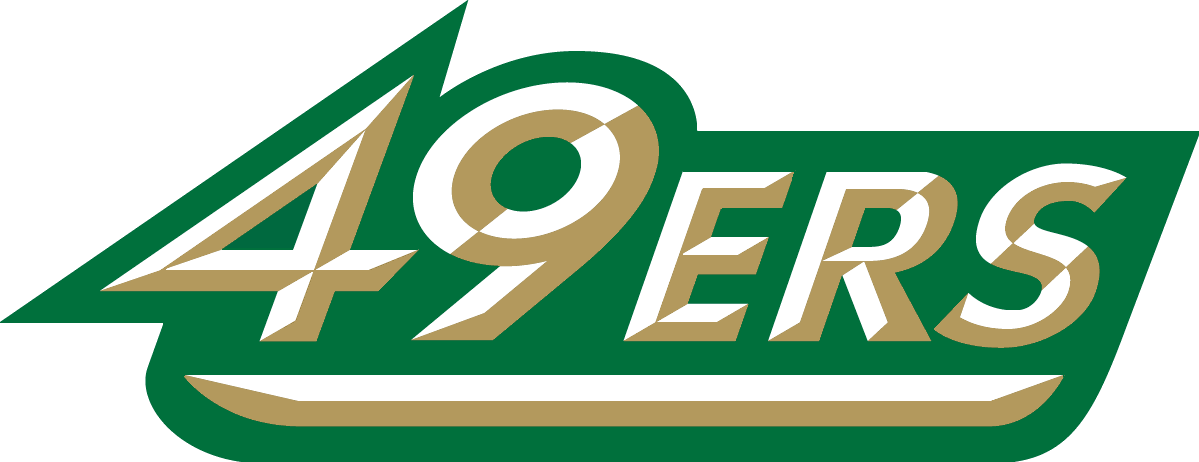
- Conference: Conference USA
- Record: 13–17 (7–11 C-USA)
- Head coach: Mark Price (2nd season)
- Assistant coaches: Houston Fancher; Chris Ferguson; Andre Gray
- Home arena: Dale F. Halton Arena

2016–17 Conference USA men's basketball standings
| | Conf. | | | | Overall |
| Team | W | | L | PCT | W | | L | PCT |
|---|---|---|---|---|---|---|---|---|
| Middle Tennessee † | 17 | – | 1 | .944 | 31 | – | 5 | .861 |
| Louisiana Tech | 14 | – | 4 | .778 | 23 | – | 10 | .697 |
| Old Dominion | 12 | – | 6 | .667 | 19 | – | 12 | .613 |
| UTEP | 12 | – | 6 | .667 | 15 | – | 17 | .469 |
| Rice | 11 | – | 7 | .611 | 23 | – | 12 | .657 |
| Marshall | 10 | – | 8 | .556 | 20 | – | 15 | .571 |
| UAB | 9 | – | 9 | .500 | 17 | – | 16 | .515 |
| Western Kentucky | 9 | – | 9 | .500 | 15 | – | 17 | .469 |
| UTSA | 8 | – | 10 | .444 | 14 | – | 19 | .424 |
| Charlotte | 7 | – | 11 | .389 | 13 | – | 17 | .433 |
| Florida Atlantic | 6 | – | 12 | .333 | 10 | – | 20 | .333 |
| Southern Miss | 6 | – | 12 | .333 | 9 | – | 22 | .290 |
| FIU | 3 | – | 15 | .167 | 7 | – | 24 | .226 |
| North Texas | 2 | – | 16 | .111 | 8 | – | 22 | .267 |
† 2017 C-USA Tournament winner

The 2016–17 Charlotte 49ers men's basketball team represented the University of North Carolina at Charlotte during the 2016–17 NCAA Division I men's basketball season. The 49ers, led by second-year head coach Mark Price, played their home games at the Dale F. Halton Arena and were members Conference USA. They finished the season 13–17, 7–11 in C-USA play to finish in 10th place. They lost to UAB in the first round of the C-USA tournament.

== Previous season ==
The 49ers finished the 2015–16 season 14–19, 9–9 in C-USA play to finish in seventh place. They defeated Rice in the second round of the C-USA tournament to advance to the quarterfinals where they lost to Middle Tennessee.

== Preseason ==
The 49ers were pick to finish eighth in the Conference USA preseason poll.

== Departures ==
| Name | Number | Pos. | Height | Weight | Year | Hometown | Notes |
|---|---|---|---|---|---|---|---|
| Ridell Camidge | 0 | G | 6'3" | 175 | Sophomore | Wilmington, NC | Transferred to Tarleton State |
| Gavin Wilson | 5 | G | 6'1" | 210 | Senior | Raleigh, NC | Walk-on; graduated |
| Curran Scott | 10 | G | 6'3" | 193 | Freshman | Edmond, OK | Transferred to Tulsa |
| Cameron Blakely | 20 | F | 6'9" | 214 | Junior | Winder, GA | Graduate transferred to West Georgia |
| Bernard Sullivan | 22 | F | 6'8" | 231 | RS Senior | Gastonia, NC | Graduated |
| Mitch Warner | 30 | G | 6'3" | 192 | Senior | Charlotte, NC | Walk-on; graduated |
| Cameron Pappas | 35 | G | 6'1" | 175 | Senior | Hillsborough, NC | Graduated |
| Joseph Uchebo | 50 | C | 6'10" | 235 | Senior | Enugu, Nigeria | Graduated |
| Ivan Benkovic | 55 | G | 6'7" | 207 | Junior | Zagreb, Croatia | Transferred to Mid-America Christian |

== Incoming transfers ==
| Name | Number | Pos. | Height | Weight | Year | Hometown | Previous |
|---|---|---|---|---|---|---|---|
| Austin Ajukwa | 5 | F | 6'6" | 205 | Senior | Columbia, SC | Transferred from Clemson. Under NCAA transfer rules, Ajukwa will have to sit out for the 2016–17 season. Will have one year of remaining eligibility. |
| J. C. Washington | 14 | F | 6'6" | 220 | Junior | Houston, TX | Junior college transferred from Trinity Valley Community College. |

== Class of 2016 recruits ==
College recruiting information
| Name | Hometown | School | Height | Weight | Commit date |
|---|---|---|---|---|---|
| Quentin Jackson #37 PG | Raleigh, NC | Carlisle School | 6 ft 3 in (1.91 m) | 170 lb (77 kg) | Aug 20, 2015 |
| Quentin Jackson #37 PG | Recruit ratings: Scout: Rivals: (78) | | | | |
| Ryan Murphy #60 PG | Calabasas, CA | Calabasas High School | 6 ft 2 in (1.88 m) | 185 lb (84 kg) | |
| Ryan Murphy #60 PG | Recruit ratings: Scout: Rivals: (69) | | | | |
| Najee Garvin; SF | Lexington, SC | Moravian Prep | 6 ft 7 in (2.01 m) | N/A | Jan 25, 2016 |
| Najee Garvin; SF | Recruit ratings: Scout: Rivals: (NR) | | | | |
Overall recruit ranking:
Note: In many cases, Scout, Rivals, 247Sports, On3, and ESPN may conflict in their listings of height and weight.; In these cases, the average was taken. ESPN grades are on a 100-point scale.; Sources: "2016 Team Ranking". Rivals.

== Roster ==
2016–17 Charlotte 49ers men's basketball team
Players
Coaches

| Pos. | # | Name | Height | Weight | Year | Previous school | Hometown |
|---|---|---|---|---|---|---|---|
| F | 0 | Najee Garvin | 6 ft 7 in (2.01 m) | 213 lb (97 kg) | Fr | Moravian Prep Academy | Lexington, South Carolina |
| G | 1 | Braxton Ogbueze | 6 ft 1 in (1.85 m) | 185 lb (84 kg) | RS Sr | Florida | Charlotte, North Carolina |
| G | 2 | Andrien White | 6 ft 3 in (1.91 m) | 185 lb (84 kg) | So | Quality Education Academy | Richmond, Virginia |
| G | 3 | Jon Davis | 6 ft 3 in (1.91 m) | 195 lb (88 kg) | So | Hargrave Military Academy | Upper Marlboro, Maryland |
| G | 5 | Austin Ajukwa (I) (redshirt) | 6 ft 7 in (2.01 m) | 205 lb (93 kg) | RS Jr | Clemson | Columbia, South Carolina |
| G | 10 | Corey Bias (W) | 6 ft 1 in (1.85 m) | 190 lb (86 kg) | Jr | Rufus King High School | Milwaukee, Wisconsin |
| G | 11 | Quentin Jackson | 6 ft 3 in (1.91 m) | 184 lb (83 kg) | Fr | Cape Fear Christian Academy | Cary, North Carolina |
| F/C | 12 | Lukas Bergang | 7 ft 1 in (2.16 m) | 215 lb (98 kg) | RS Fr | Jensen Gymnasium Orebro | Gothenburg, Sweden |
| F | 14 | JC Washington | 6 ft 7 in (2.01 m) | 240 lb (109 kg) | Jr | Trinity Valley Community College | Houston, Texas |
| F | 15 | Anthony Vanhook | 6 ft 4 in (1.93 m) | 225 lb (102 kg) | Sr | Cape Fear Community College | Chapel Hill, North Carolina |
| G | 21 | Hudson Price | 6 ft 7 in (2.01 m) | 215 lb (98 kg) | RS Jr | TCU | Orlando, Florida |
| G | 24 | Ryan Murphy | 6 ft 2 in (1.88 m) | 192 lb (87 kg) | Fr | Calabasas High School | Calabasas, California |
| F | 25 | Reid Aube (W) | 6 ft 7 in (2.01 m) | 223 lb (101 kg) | Sr | Concord High School | Concord, North Carolina |
| F | 30 | Luke Sasser (W) | 6 ft 5 in (1.96 m) | 220 lb (100 kg) | Fr | Carlisle School | Raleigh, North Carolina |
| C | 31 | Benas Griciunas | 7 ft 0 in (2.13 m) | 244 lb (111 kg) | RS Jr | Auburn | Šilutė, Lithuania |
| F | 35 | Bo Blight (W) | 6 ft 7 in (2.01 m) | 192 lb (87 kg) | Fr | South Mecklenburg High School | Charlotte, North Carolina |

Head coach

- Mark Price (Georgia Tech)

Assistant coach(es)

- Houston Fancher (Middle Tennessee)
- Chris Ferguson (Cumberlands)
- Andre Gray (Methodist)

Legend

- (C) Team captain
- (S) Suspended
- (I) Ineligible
- (W) Walk-on
- Injured
- Current redshirt

Roster

== Schedule and results ==
| Date time, TV | Rank^{#} | Opponent^{#} | Result | Record | Site (attendance) city, state |
Non-conference regular season
| 11/11/2016*; 8:00 pm | | Newberry College | W 101–88 | 1–0 | Dale F. Halton Arena (4,866); Charlotte, NC |
| 11/14/2016*; 8:00 pm | | at Elon | W 100–95 | 2–0 | Alumni Gym (1,478); Elon, NC |
| 11/17/2016*; 7:00 pm | | East Carolina | W 76–64 | 3–0 | Dale F. Halton Arena (4,281); Charlotte, NC |
| 11/22/2016*; 7:00 pm | | USC Upstate | L 103–108 ^{OT} | 3–1 | Dale F. Halton Arena (3,570); Charlotte, NC |
| 11/26/2016*; 4:00 pm, SPEC | | at Davidson | L 57–79 | 3–2 | John M. Belk Arena (4,748); Davidson, NC |
| 11/28/2016*; 7:00 pm | | Appalachian State | W 80–72 | 4–2 | Dale F. Halton Arena (4,153); Charlotte, NC |
| 11/30/2016*; 7:00 pm | | James Madison | W 65–56 | 5–2 | Dale F. Halton Arena (3,433); Charlotte, NC |
| 12/03/2016*; 7:00 pm | | Oregon State | W 69–66 | 6–2 | Dale F. Halton Arena (5,366); Charlotte, NC |
| 12/06/2016*; 7:00 pm, ACCN Extra | | at Wake Forest | L 74–91 | 6–3 | LJVM Coliseum (6,791); Winston-Salem, NC |
| 12/17/2016*; 4:00 pm, FS2 | | vs. Florida; Orange Bowl Basketball Classic | L 46–87 | 6–4 | BB&T Center; Sunrise, FL |
| 12/20/2016*; 7:00 pm, ESPN2 | | vs. Maryland; Baltimore Showcase | L 72–88 | 6–5 | Royal Farms Arena (7,139); Baltimore, MD |
Conference USA regular season
| 12/31/2016; 12:00 pm | | North Texas | W 101–76 | 7–5 (1–0) | Dale F. Halton Arena (3,792); Charlotte, NC |
| 01/02/2017; 7:00 pm | | Rice | L 70–89 | 7–6 (1–1) | Dale F. Halton Arena (3,660); Charlotte, NC |
| 01/05/2017; 8:00 pm | | at WKU | L 80–82 | 7–7 (1–2) | E. A. Diddle Arena (2,568); Bowling Green, KY |
| 01/07/2017; 7:00 pm | | at Marshall | L 93–110 | 7–8 (1–3) | Cam Henderson Center (6,617); Huntington, WV |
| 01/12/2017; 7:00 pm, ESPN3 | | Louisiana Tech | L 73–79 | 7–9 (1–4) | Dale F. Halton Arena (4,319); Charlotte, NC |
| 01/14/2017; 7:00 pm, CI | | Southern Miss | W 82–66 | 8–9 (2–4) | Dale F. Halton Arena (4,457); Charlotte, NC |
| 01/21/2017; 8:00 pm, ASN | | Old Dominion | W 74–72 | 9–9 (3–4) | Dale F. Halton Arena (5,650); Charlotte, NC |
| 01/26/2017; 8:00 pm | | at North Texas | W 82–81 | 10–9 (4–4) | The Super Pit (2,006); Denton, TX |
| 01/28/2017; 8:00 pm | | at Rice | L 67–84 | 10–10 (4–5) | Tudor Fieldhouse (2,206); Houston, TX |
| 02/02/2017; 7:00 pm | | Florida Atlantic | L 75–77 | 10–11 (4–6) | Dale F. Halton Arena (4,707); Charlotte, NC |
| 02/04/2017; 7:00 pm | | FIU | W 95–80 | 11–11 (5–6) | Dale F. Halton Arena (5,316); Charlotte, NC |
| 02/09/2017; 7:00 pm, CI | | at UAB | L 69–82 | 11–12 (5–7) | Bartow Arena (3,841); Birmingham, AL |
| 02/11/2017; 6:00 pm, CI | | at Middle Tennessee | L 55–70 | 11–13 (5–8) | Murphy Center (5,720); Murfreesboro, TN |
| 02/18/2017; 7:00 pm, ESPN3 | | at Old Dominion | L 48–72 | 11–14 (5–9) | Ted Constant Convocation Center (7,090); Norfolk, VA |
| 02/23/2017; 7:00 pm, CI | | WKU | W 83–77 | 12–14 (6–9) | Dale F. Halton Arena (3,655); Charlotte, NC |
| 02/25/2017; 6:00 pm, ASN | | Marshall | L 89–93 | 12–15 (6–10) | Dale F. Halton Arena (7,040); Charlotte, NC |
| 03/02/2017; 8:00 pm | | at UTSA | W 76-75 | 13–15 (7–10) | Convocation Center (1,006); San Antonio, TX |
| 03/04/2017; 3:00 pm | | at UTEP | L 67-74 | 13–16 (7–11) | Don Haskins Center; El Paso, TX |
Conference USA tournament
| 03/07/2017; 5:30, CI | (10) | vs. (7) UAB; First Round | L 73–74 | 13–17 | Legacy Arena (6,410); Birmingham, AL |
*Non-conference game. ^{#}Rankings from AP Poll/Coaches' Poll. (#) Tournament seedings in parentheses. All times are in Eastern Time. Source
