= 2016–17 Marshall Thundering Herd men's basketball team =

American college basketball season

2016–17 Marshall Thundering Herd men's basketball
- Conference: Conference USA
- Record: 20–15 (10–8 C-USA)
- Head coach: Dan D'Antoni (3rd season)
- Assistant coaches: Mark Cline; Scott Rigot
- Home arena: Cam Henderson Center

2016–17 Conference USA men's basketball standings
	Conf.				Overall
Team	W		L	PCT	W		L	PCT
Middle Tennessee †	17	–	1	.944	31	–	5	.861
Louisiana Tech	14	–	4	.778	23	–	10	.697
Old Dominion	12	–	6	.667	19	–	12	.613
UTEP	12	–	6	.667	15	–	17	.469
Rice	11	–	7	.611	23	–	12	.657
Marshall	10	–	8	.556	20	–	15	.571
UAB	9	–	9	.500	17	–	16	.515
Western Kentucky	9	–	9	.500	15	–	17	.469
UTSA	8	–	10	.444	14	–	19	.424
Charlotte	7	–	11	.389	13	–	17	.433
Florida Atlantic	6	–	12	.333	10	–	20	.333
Southern Miss	6	–	12	.333	9	–	22	.290
FIU	3	–	15	.167	7	–	24	.226
North Texas	2	–	16	.111	8	–	22	.267
† 2017 C-USA Tournament winner

The 2016–17 Marshall Thundering Herd men's basketball team represented Marshall University during the 2016–17 NCAA Division I men's basketball season. The Thundering Herd, led by third-year head coach Dan D'Antoni, played their home games at the Cam Henderson Center and were members of Conference USA. They finished the season 20–15, 10–8 in C-USA play to finish in sixth place. They defeated Florida Atlantic, Old Dominion, and Louisiana Tech to advance to the championship game of the C-USA tournament. There they lost to top-seeded Middle Tennessee. Despite finishing with 20 wins, they did not participate in a postseason tournament.

On January 24, 2017, assistant coach Chris Duhon resigned following an arrest for driving on a revoked license three days earlier.

== Previous season ==
The Thundering Herd finished the 2015–16 season 17–16, 12–6 in C-USA play to finish in a three-way tie for third place. They defeated UTEP in the quarterfinals of the C-USA tournament before losing in the semifinals to Middle Tennessee.

== Preseason ==
The Thundering Herd was picked to finish in fourth place in the preseason Conference USA poll. Jon Elmore and Ryan Taylor were selected to the preseason All-Conference USA team.

== Offseason ==
=== Departures ===
Name	Number	Pos.	Height	Weight	Year	Hometown	Notes
Brett Bowling	3	G	6'4"	192	Sophomore	Pineville, West Virginia	Walk-on; transferred to West Virginia Wesleyan
Justin Edmonds	23	G	6'4"	220	RS Senior	Albion, Michigan	Graduated
James Kelly	24	F	6'8"	259	Senior	Ann Arbor, Michigan	Graduated
Aleksandar Dozic	32	F	6'9"	220	Freshman	Podgorica, Montenegro	Transferred to Marist

=== Incoming transfers ===
Name	Number	Pos.	Height	Weight	Year	Hometown	Previous School
Rondale Watson	23	G	6'3"	190	Junior	Lewisburg, West Virginia	Transferred from Wake Forest. Under NCAA transfer rules, Watson will have to sit out in the 2016–17 season. Will have two years of eligibility left.
Ot Elmore	24	G	6'3"	190	RS Junior	Charleston, West Virginia	Transferred from Texas–Rio Grande Valley. Will be eligible to play immediately since Elmore graduated from UTRGV.

== Recruiting ==
College recruiting information
Name	Hometown	School	Height	Weight	Commit date
Phil Bledsoe #102 PF	Wheeling, West Virginia	Wheeling Park High School	6 ft 6 in (1.98 m)	212 lb (96 kg)	Sep 14, 2015
Phil Bledsoe #102 PF	Recruit ratings: Scout: Rivals: ESPN:				
Jannson Williams; PF	Newnan, Georgia	Newnan High School	6 ft 8 in (2.03 m)	200 lb (91 kg)	Jun 18, 2015
Jannson Williams; PF	Recruit ratings: Scout: Rivals: (NR)				
Ky're Allison; PG	Portsmouth, Ohio	Portsmouth High School	6 ft 2 in (1.88 m)	185 lb (84 kg)	Apr 7, 2016
Ky're Allison; PG	Recruit ratings: Scout: Rivals: (NR)				
Overall recruit ranking: Scout: NR Rivals: NR ESPN: NR
Note: In many cases, Scout, Rivals, 247Sports, On3, and ESPN may conflict in their listings of height and weight.; In these cases, the average was taken. ESPN grades are on a 100-point scale.; Sources: "Marshall Basketball Commitment List". Rivals.; "2016 Marshall Basketball Commits". Scout.; "ESPN". ESPN.; "Scout.com Team Recruiting Rankings". Scout.; "2016 Team Ranking". Rivals.

== Roster ==
2016–17 Marshall Thundering Herd men's basketball team
Players
Coaches

Pos.	#	Name	Height	Weight	Year	Previous school	Hometown
F	0	Christian Thieneman	6 ft 5 in (1.96 m)	208 lb (94 kg)	RS Fr	Trinity	Louisville, Kentucky
F	1	Terrence Thompson	6 ft 7 in (2.01 m)	217 lb (98 kg)	Jr	Georgia Highlands	Durham, North Carolina
G	2	Stevie Browning	6 ft 3 in (1.91 m)	188 lb (85 kg)	Sr	Fairmont State	Logan, West Virginia
F	3	Jannson Williams	6 ft 8 in (2.03 m)	206 lb (93 kg)	Fr	Newnan	Newnan, Georgia
F	4	Jacob Kilgore (W)	6 ft 5 in (1.96 m)	191 lb (87 kg)	So	Spring Valley	Huntington, West Virginia
G	5	Ky're Allison	6 ft 2 in (1.88 m)	181 lb (82 kg)	Fr	Portsmouth	Portsmouth, Ohio
F	11	Ajdin Penava	6 ft 9 in (2.06 m)	222 lb (101 kg)	So	Fifth High School	Sarajevo, Bosnia and Herzegovina
G	14	C.J. Burks	6 ft 3 in (1.91 m)	203 lb (92 kg)	RS So	Hedgesville	Martinsburg, West Virginia
G	21	Aleksa Nikolić	6 ft 6.5 in (1.99 m)	221 lb (100 kg)	RS So	Electro-Tech School	Pančevo, Serbia
G	23	Rondale Watson (I) (redshirt)	6 ft 4 in (1.93 m)	188 lb (85 kg)	Jr	Wake Forest	Lewisburg, West Virginia
G	24	Ot Elmore	6 ft 2 in (1.88 m)	197 lb (89 kg)	RS Jr	Texas–Rio Grande Valley	Charleston, West Virginia
F	25	Ryan Taylor	6 ft 5 in (1.96 m)	249 lb (113 kg)	RS Sr	Hargrave Military Academy	Indianapolis, Indiana
G/F	32	Phil Bledsoe	6 ft 6 in (1.98 m)	224 lb (102 kg)	Fr	Wheeling Park	Wheeling, West Virginia
G	33	Jon Elmore	6 ft 3 in (1.91 m)	189 lb (86 kg)	Jr	VMI	Charleston, West Virginia
G	35	Austin Loop	6 ft 4 in (1.93 m)	210 lb (95 kg)	RS Sr	South Webster	South Webster, Ohio
F	50	Milan Mijovic	6 ft 9 in (2.06 m)	245 lb (111 kg)	Jr	Secondary Vocational School	Belgrade, Serbia

Head coach

- Dan D'Antoni (Marshall)

Assistant coach(es)

- Mark Cline (Wake Forest)
- Scott Rigot (Buffalo)

Legend

- (C) Team captain
- (S) Suspended
- (I) Ineligible
- (W) Walk-on
- Injured
- Current redshirt

Roster

== Schedule and results ==
Date time, TV	Rank^{#}	Opponent^{#}	Result	Record	Site (attendance) city, state
Exhibition
11/03/2016*; 6:00 pm		West Virginia State	W 93–70		Cam Henderson Center (5,178); Huntington, WV
11/06/2016*; 2:00 pm		Charleston (WV)	W 100–76		Cam Henderson Center (5,138); Huntington, WV
Non-conference regular season
11/12/2016*; 12:00 pm		North Carolina Central; Global Sports Invitational	W 81–69	1–0	Cam Henderson Center (5,375); Huntington, WV
11/16/2016*; 7:00 pm		Morehead State	W 85–77	2–0	Cam Henderson Center (5,872); Huntington, WV
11/19/2016*; 5:00 pm		Western Carolina; Global Sports Invitational	W 98–63	3–0	Cam Henderson Center (5,741); Huntington, WV
11/21/2016*; 7:00 pm		Jackson State; Global Sports Invitational	W 71–61	4–0	Cam Henderson Center (4,785); Huntington, WV
11/25/2016*; 7:00 pm, BTN		at Ohio State; Global Sports Invitational	L 70–111	4–1	Value City Arena (14,355); Columbus, OH
11/30/2016*; 7:00 pm		Ohio	W 98–88	5–1	Cam Henderson Center (6,031); Huntington, WV
12/03/2016*; 4:00 pm		at Eastern Kentucky	L 80–89	5–2	McBrayer Arena (2,100); Richmond, KY
12/06/2016*; 7:00 pm		at Chattanooga	L 85–96	5–3	McKenzie Arena (3,064); Chattanooga, TN
12/10/2016*; 7:00 pm		Toledo	W 111–105 ^{OT}	6–3	Cam Henderson Center (5,696); Huntington, WV
12/17/2016*; 7:30 pm		at Akron	L 88–99	6–4	James A. Rhodes Arena (3,598); Akron, OH
12/19/2016*; 6:00 pm		West Virginia Wesleyan	W 81–65	7–4	Cam Henderson Center (5,196); Huntington, WV
12/22/2016*; 7:00 pm, CBSSN		at No. 24 Cincinnati	L 91–93 ^{OT}	7–5	Fifth Third Arena (10,540); Cincinnati, OH
12/28/2016*; 7:00 pm, ACCN Extra		at Pittsburgh	L 106–112	7–6	Peterson Events Center (8,028); Pittsburgh, PA
Conference USA regular season
12/31/2016; 1:00 pm		at FIU	W 94–70	8–6 (1–0)	FIU Arena (598); Miami, FL
01/02/2017; 7:00 pm		at Florida Atlantic	W 89–72	9–6 (2–0)	FAU Arena (1,009); Boca Raton, FL
01/05/2017; 7:00 pm		Old Dominion	W 90–86 ^{OT}	10–6 (3–0)	Cam Henderson Center (4,573); Huntington, WV
01/07/2017; 7:00 pm		Charlotte	W 110–93	11–6 (4–0)	Cam Henderson Center (6,617); Huntington, WV
01/12/2017; 8:00 pm, beIN		at Middle Tennessee	L 57–69	11–7 (4–1)	Murphy Center (4,598); Murfreesboro, TN
01/14/2017; 2:00 pm		at UAB	L 78–94	11–8 (4–2)	Bartow Arena (3,275); Birmingham, AL
01/21/2017; 6:00 pm, ASN		WKU	W 94–80	12–8 (5–2)	Cam Henderson Center (6,813); Huntington, WV
01/26/2017; 7:00 pm		UTSA	W 92–71	13–8 (6–2)	Cam Henderson Center (5,297); Huntington, WV
01/28/2017; 7:00 pm		UTEP	L 68–91	13–9 (6–3)	Cam Henderson Center (6,781); Huntington, WV
02/02/2017; 8:00 pm		at Southern Miss	L 76–91	13–10 (6–4)	Reed Green Coliseum (2,373); Hattiesburg, MS
02/04/2017; 7:30 pm		at Louisiana Tech	L 90–94	13–11 (6–5)	Thomas Assembly Center (4,804); Ruston, LA
02/11/2017; 6:00 pm, FCS		at WKU	W 84–79	14–11 (7–5)	E. A. Diddle Arena (4,742); Bowling Green, KY
02/16/2017; 7:00 pm, CBSSN		UAB	W 74–59	15–11 (8–5)	Cam Henderson Center (5,637); Huntington, WV
02/18/2017; 6:00 pm, ASN		Middle Tennessee	L 86–97	15–12 (8–6)	Cam Henderson Center (7,620); Huntington, WV
02/23/2017; 8:00 pm, beIN		at Old Dominion	L 65–86	15–13 (8–7)	Ted Constant Convocation Center (6,248); Norfolk, VA
02/25/2017; 6:00 pm, ASN		at Charlotte	W 93–89	16–13 (9–7)	Dale F. Halton Arena (7,040); Charlotte, NC
03/02/2017; 7:00 pm		Rice	L 88–89	16–14 (9–8)	Cam Henderson Center (4,994); Huntington, WV
03/04/2017; 7:00 pm		North Texas	W 106–104	17–14 (10–8)	Cam Henderson Center (6,017); Huntington, WV
Conference USA tournament
03/08/2017; 9:00 pm, CI	(6)	vs. (11) Florida Atlantic; First round	W 89–74	18–14	Legacy Arena (6,410); Birmingham, AL
03/09/2017; 9:00 pm, ASN	(6)	vs. (3) Old Dominion; Quarterfinals	W 64–63	19–14	Legacy Arena (4,005); Birmingham, AL
03/10/2017; 3:00 pm, CBSSN	(6)	vs. (2) Louisiana Tech; Semifinals	W 93–77	20–14	Legacy Arena (3,299); Birmingham, AL
03/11/2017; 8:30 pm, CBSSN	(6)	vs. (1) Middle Tennessee; Championship	L 72–83	20–15	Legacy Arena (3,956); Birmingham, AL
*Non-conference game. ^{#}Rankings from AP poll. (#) Tournament seedings in parentheses. All times are in Eastern Time.
