= James Madison Dukes men's basketball statistical leaders =

The James Madison Dukes men's basketball statistical leaders are individual statistical leaders of the James Madison Dukes men's basketball program in various categories, including points, rebounds, assists, steals, and blocks. Within those areas, the lists identify single-game, single-season, and career leaders. The Dukes represent James Madison University in the NCAA Division I Sun Belt Conference.

James Madison began competing in intercollegiate men's basketball in 1969, when the school was known as Madison College; the current university name was adopted in 1976. The NCAA did not officially record assists as a stat until the 1983–84 season, and blocks and steals until the 1985–86 season, but JMUs record books include players in these stats before these seasons. These lists are updated through the end of the 2021–22 season.

== Scoring ==
Career
Rank	Player	Points	Seasons
1	Steve Stielper	2,126	1976–77 1977–78 1978–79 1979–80
2	Sherman Dillard	2,065	1973–74 1974–75 1975–76 1976–77 1977–78
3	Matt Lewis	1,928	2017–18 2018–19 2019–20 2020–21
4	Kent Culuko	1,701	1991–92 1992–93 1993–94 1994–95
5	Ron Curry	1,550	2012–13 2013–14 2014–15 2015–16
6	Darren McLinton	1,533	1992–93 1993–94 1994–95 1995–96
7	William Davis	1,505	1988–89 1989–90 1991–92 1992–93
8	Pat Dosh	1,458	1974–75 1975–76 1976–77 1977–78
9	Juwann James	1,456	2005–06 2006–07 2007–08 2008–09
10	Julius Wells	1,414	2008–09 2009–10 2010–11 2011–12
	Terrence Edwards Jr.	1,414	2020–21 2021–22 2022–23 2023–24

Season
Rank	Player	Points	Season
1	Steve Hood	682	1989–90
2	Darren McLinton	680	1995–96
3	Steve Stielper	668	1978–79
4	Louis Rowe	629	1994–95
5	Terrence Edwards Jr.	618	2023–24
6	Steve Hood	600	1990–91
7	Stuckey Mosley	590	2017–18
8	Denzel Bowles	581	2010–11
9	Matt Lewis	569	2019–20
10	Clayton Ritter	548	1993–94

Single game
Rank	Player	Points	Season	Opponent
1	Steve Stielper	51	1978–79	Robert Morris
2	Sherman Dillard	42	1974–75	St. Paul's
	Kent Culuko	42	1993–94	Rutgers
4	Steve Stielper	41	1978–79	George Mason
5	Sherman Dillard	40	1975–76	Elon
	Sherman Dillard	40	1974–75	FDU Madison
	Denzel Bowles	40	2010–11	Towson
	Matt Lewis	40	2018–19	Hofstra
9	Sherman Dillard	38	1973–74	Valdosta State
10	Abdulai Jalloh	37	2007–08	UNCW
	Denzel Bowles	37	2009–10	Gardner-Webb
	Stuckey Mosley	37	2017–18	Hofstra

== Rebounds ==
Career
Rank	Player	Rebounds	Seasons
1	Steve Stielper	917	1976–77 1977–78 1978–79 1979–80
2	Pat Dosh	821	1974–75 1975–76 1976–77 1977–78
3	David Correll	778	1972–73 1973–74 1974–75 1975–76
4	Jeff Chambers	769	1989–90 1990–91 1991–92 1992–93
5	Eugene Atkinson	741	1995–96 1996–97 1997–98 1998–99
6	Gary Butler	682	1969–70 1970–71 1971–72 1972–73
7	Dan Ruland	640	1979–80 1980–81 1981–82 1982–83
8	Juwann James	639	2005–06 2006–07 2007–08 2008–09
9	Ian Caskill	615	1999–00 2000–01 2001–02 2002–03
10	Charles Lott	601	1993–94 1994–95 1995–96 1996–97

Season
Rank	Player	Rebounds	Season
1	T.J. Bickerstaff	302	2023–24
2	Denzel Bowles	290	2010–11
3	Steve Stielper	279	1976–77
4	Jeff Chambers	266	1991–92
5	Rayshawn Goins	257	2012–13
6	David Correll	253	1975–76
	Joe Frye	253	1972–73
8	Dwight Wilson	248	2018–19
	David Correll	248	1974–75
10	Pat Dosh	247	1976–77
	Gary Butler	247	1971–72

Single game
Rank	Player	Rebounds	Season	Opponent
1	Steve Stielper	22	1976–77	Charleston So.
	Joe Frye	22	1972–73	Eastern Mennonite
3	Steve Stielper	20	1976–77	Hampden-Sydney
4	Bruce Gibbons	19	1969–70	George Mason
	Gary Butler	19	1970–71	Shepherd
	Jeff Chambers	19	1991–92	Richmond
7	Steve Misenheimer	18	1969–70	George Mason
	Gary Butler	18	1970–71	Luther Rice
	George Toliver	18	1970–71	Eastern Mennonite
	Zach Jacobs	18	2018–19	The Citadel
	Dwight Wilson	18	2018–19	Drexel

== Assists ==
Career
Rank	Player	Assists	Seasons
1	Devon Moore	502	2008–09 2010–11 2011–12 2012–13
2	Pierre Curtis	463	2006–07 2007–08 2008–09 2009–10
3	Joe Pfahler	420	1972–73 1973–74 1974–75 1975–76
4	Ron Curry	417	2012–13 2013–14 2014–15 2015–16
5	Ben Gordon	354	1986–87 1987–88
6	Chris Williams	351	2000–01 2001–02 2002–03 2003–04
7	David Dupont	349	1979–80 1980–81 1981–82 1982–83
8	Derek Steele	338	1980–81 1981–82 1982–83 1983–84
9	Robert Griffin	313	1984–85 1985–86 1986–87 1987–88
10	Roger Hughett	296	1975–76 1976–77 1977–78 1978–79

Season
Rank	Player	Assists	Season
1	Ben Gordon	221	1986–87
2	Devon Moore	172	2012–13
3	Jeff Cross	162	1976–77
4	Joe Pfahler	185	1975–76
5	Ron Curry	143	2014–15
6	Devon Moore	137	2010–11
7	Derek Steele	133	1983–84
	Ben Gordon	133	1987–88
9	Wilbert Mills	127	1973–74
10	Terrence Edwards Jr.	123	2023–24

Single game
Rank	Player	Assists	Season	Opponent
1	Jeff Cross	16	1976–77	Wilmington Col.
2	Ben Gordon	15	1986–87	UNCW
3	Jeff Cross	14	1976–77	Rutgers-Camden
	Derek Steele	14	1983–84	George Mason
5	Joe Pfahler	13	1975–76	St. Leo

== Steals ==
Career
Rank	Player	Steals	Seasons
1	Pierre Curtis	175	2006–07 2007–08 2008–09 2009–10
2	Darius Banks	148	2017–18 2018–19 2019–20
3	David Dupont	145	1979–80 1980–81 1981–82 1982–83
4	Eric Brent	137	1983–84 1984–85 1985–86 1986–87
5	Derek Steele	136	1980–81 1981–82 1982–83 1983–84
6	Juwann James	134	2005–06 2006–07 2007–08 2008–09
7	Ron Curry	131	2012–13 2013–14 2014–15 2015–16
8	Charles Fisher	126	1979–80 1980–81 1981–82 1982–83
9	Darren McLinton	123	1992–93 1993–94 1994–95 1995–96
10	William Davis	122	1988–89 1989–90 1991–92 1992–93

Season
Rank	Player	Steals	Season
1	Ben Gordon	63	1986–87
2	Darius Banks	56	2018–19
3	A. J. Davis	55	2011–12
4	Derek Steele	53	1983–84
5	Dwayne Broyles	52	2003–04
	Andre Nation	52	2012–13
	Xavier Brown	52	2023–24
8	Ben Gordon	51	1987–88
	Pierre Curtis	51	2008–09
	Ben Louis	51	2009–10

Single game
Rank	Player	Steals	Season	Opponent
1	Terell Strickland	10	2020–21	Limestone
2	Fess Irvin	7	1989–90	North Carolina
	Andre Nation	7	2013–14	UNCW

== Blocks ==
Career
Rank	Player	Blocks	Seasons
1	Barry Brown	198	1987–88 1988–89 1989–90 1990–91
2	Rob Strickland	157	1996–97 1997–98 1998–99 1999–00
3	Jeff Chambers	131	1989–90 1990–91 1991–92 1992–93
	Ian Caskill	131	1999–00 2000–01 2001–02 2002–03
5	Yohanny Dalembert	116	2013–14 2014–15 2015–16 2016–17
6	Andrey Semenov	102	2008–09 2009–10 2010–11 2011–12 2012–13 2013–14
7	James Coleman	101	1994–95 1995–96
8	Denzel Bowles	89	2009–10 2010–11
9	Tyrone Shoulders	85	1977–78 1978–79 1979–80 1980–81
	Thom Brand	85	1985–86 1986–87 1987–88

Season
Rank	Player	Blocks	Season
1	Barry Brown	71	1988–89
2	Barry Brown	66	1989–90
3	Jeff Chambers	60	1991–92
4	James Coleman	57	1994–95
5	Ian Caskill	54	2002–03
6	Denzel Bowles	53	2010–11
7	Chancellor Nichols	52	1990–91
8	Kenny Whitehead	50	2002–03
9	Christian Brown	49	2025–26
10	Rob Strickland	48	1998–99
	Cavell Johnson	48	2004–05

Single game
Rank	Player	Blocks	Season	Opponent
1	Barry Brown	11	1989–90	American
2	Jeff Chambers	8	1991–92	American
3	Barry Brown	7	1988–89	American
	Paul Carter	7	1991–92	Georgia Tech
	Kenny Whitehead	7	2002–03	Furman
	Alvin Brown	7	2009–10	Longwood
	Christian Brown	7	2025–26	Akron
