= List of Old Dominion Monarchs men's basketball seasons =

The following is a complete list of Old Dominion Monarchs men's basketball seasons for Old Dominion University.

== Seasons ==
Statistics overview
Season	Coach	Overall	Conference	Standing	Postseason
Independent (1930–1966)
1930–31	Tommy Scott	11–10			
1931–32	Tommy Scott	7–9			
1932–33	Tommy Scott	8–6			
1933–34	Tommy Scott	10–4			
1934–35	Tommy Scott	11–6			
1935–36	Tommy Scott	10–6			
1936–37	Tommy Scott	8–8			
1937–38	Tommy Scott	15–4			
1938–39	Tommy Scott	8–14			
1939–40	Tommy Scott	4–16			
1940–41	George Stirnweiss	4–15			
1941–42	George Stirnweiss	0–14			
1942–43	Scrap Chandler	12–10			
1944–45	Scrap Chandler	6–6			
1945–46	Scrap Chandler	9–8			
1946–47	Julius Rubin	14–8			
1947–48	Jack Callahan	21–8			
1948–49	Bud Metheny	11–5			
1949–50	Bud Metheny	9–10			
1950–51	Bud Metheny	11–10			
1951–52	Bud Metheny	12–13			
1952–53	Bud Metheny	8–12			
1953–54	Bud Metheny	12–10			
1954–55	Bud Metheny	7–15			
1955–56	Bud Metheny	8–12			
1956–57	Bud Metheny	11–10			
1957–58	Bud Metheny	12–9			
1958–59	Bud Metheny	15–8			
1959–60	Bud Metheny	12–6			
1960–61	Bud Metheny	16–4			
1961–62	Bud Metheny	18–3			
1962–63	Bud Metheny	13–13			
1963–64	Bud Metheny	13–10			
1964–65	Bud Metheny	10–13			
1965–66	Sonny Allen	7–17			
1966–67	Sonny Allen	14–12			
1967–68	Sonny Allen	19–7			
1968–69	Sonny Allen	21–10			
1969–70	Sonny Allen	21–7			
1970–71	Sonny Allen	21–9			
1971–72	Sonny Allen	14–10			
1972–73	Sonny Allen	19–9			
1973–74	Sonny Allen	20–7			
1974–75	Sonny Allen	25–6			NCAA Division II Champions
1975–76	Paul Webb	19–12			
Eastern College Athletic Conference (1976–1979)
1976–77	Paul Webb	25–4			NIT 1st Round
1977–78	Paul Webb	11–15			
1978–79	Paul Webb	23–7			NIT Quarterfinals
ECAC South Conference (1979–1982)
1979–80	Paul Webb	25–5			NCAA 1st Round
1980–81	Paul Webb	18–10			NIT 1st Round
1981–82	Paul Webb	18–12			NCAA 1st Round
Sun Belt Conference (1982–1991)
1982–83	Paul Webb	19–10	12–2		NIT 1st Round
1983–84	Paul Webb	19–12	9–5		NIT 1st Round
1984–85	Paul Webb	19–12	12–5		NCAA 1st Round
1985–86	Tom Young	23–8	11–3	1st	NCAA 2nd Round
1986–87	Tom Young	6–22	1–13		
1987–88	Tom Young	18–12	9–5		NIT 1st Round
1988–89	Tom Young	15–13	7–7		
1989–90	Tom Young	14–14	7–7		
1990–91	Tom Young	14–18	5–9		
Colonial Athletic Association (1991–2013)
1991–92	Oliver Purnell	15–15	8–6		NCAA 1st Round
1992–93	Oliver Purnell	21–8	11–3		NIT 2nd Round
1993–94	Oliver Purnell	21–10	10–4		NIT 2nd Round
1994–95	Jeff Capel	21–12	12–2		NCAA 2nd Round
1995–96	Jeff Capel	18–13	12–4		
1996–97	Jeff Capel	22–11	10–6		NCAA 1st Round
1997–98	Jeff Capel	12–16	8–8		
1998–99	Jeff Capel	25–9	10–6		NIT 2nd Round
1999–00	Jeff Capel	11–19	6–10		
2000–01	Jeff Capel	13–18	7–9		
2001–02	Blaine Taylor	13–16	7–11	7th	
2002–03	Blaine Taylor	12–15	9–9	T–5th	
2003–04	Blaine Taylor	17–12	11–7	4th	
2004–05	Blaine Taylor	28–6	15–3	1st	NCAA 1st Round
2005–06	Blaine Taylor	24–10	13–5	4th	NIT Semifinals
2006–07	Blaine Taylor	24–9	15–3	2nd	NCAA 1st Round
2007–08	Blaine Taylor	18–16	11–7	4th	CBI Quarterfinals
2008–09	Blaine Taylor	25–10	12–6	T–3rd	CIT Champions
2009–10	Blaine Taylor	27–9	15–3	1st	NCAA 2nd Round
2010–11	Blaine Taylor	27–7	14–4	T–2nd	NCAA 1st Round
2011–12	Blaine Taylor	22–14	13–5	4th	CIT Quarterfinals
2012–13	Blaine Taylor	5–25	3–15	11th	
Conference USA (2013–2022)
2013–14	Jeff Jones	18–18	9–7	6th	CBI Semifinals
2014–15	Jeff Jones	27–7	13–5	T–2nd	NIT Semifinals
2014–15	Jeff Jones	25–13	12–6	T–3rd	Vegas 16 Champions
2016–17	Jeff Jones	19–12	12–6	T–3rd	
2017–18	Jeff Jones	25–7	15–3	2nd	
2018–19	Jeff Jones	26–9	13–5	1st	NCAA 1st Round
2019–20	Jeff Jones	13–19	9–9	T–6th	
2020–21	Jeff Jones	15–8	11–5	4th	
2021–22	Jeff Jones	13–19	8–10	9th	
Sun Belt Conference (2022–present)
2022–23	Jeff Jones	19–12	11–7	T–6th	
2023–24	Jeff Jones	7–25	3–15	14th	
2024–25	Mike Jones	15–20	8–10	T–8th	
2025–26	Mike Jones	12–21	7–11	T–11th	
Total:		1453–1066 (.577)			
National champion Postseason invitational champion Conference regular season champion Conference regular season and conference tournament champion Division regular season champion Division regular season and conference tournament champion Conference tournament champion
