= Old Dominion Monarchs men's basketball statistical leaders =

The Old Dominion Monarchs basketball statistical leaders are individual statistical leaders of the Old Dominion Monarchs men's basketball program in various categories, including points, assists, blocks, rebounds, and steals. Within those areas, the lists identify single-game, single-season, and career leaders. The Monarchs represent Old Dominion University in the NCAA Division I Sun Belt Conference.

Old Dominion began competing in intercollegiate basketball in 1930. However, the school's record book does not generally list records from before the 1950s, as records from before this period are often incomplete and inconsistent. Since scoring was much lower in this era, and teams played much fewer games during a typical season, it is likely that few or no players from this era would appear on these lists anyway.

The NCAA did not officially record assists as a stat until the 1983–84 season, and blocks and steals until the 1985–86 season, but Old Dominion's record books includes players in these stats before these seasons. These lists are updated through the end of the 2021–22 season.

== Scoring ==
Career
Rk	Player	Points	Seasons
1	Ronnie Valentine	2,204	1976–77 1977–78 1978–79 1979–80
2	Leo Anthony	2,181	1957–58 1958–59 1959–60 1960–61
3	Odell Hodge	2,117	1992–93 1993–94 1994–95 1995–96 1996–97
4	Petey Sessoms	1,985	1991–92 1992–93 1993–94 1994–95
5	Anthony Carver	1,958	1986–87 1987–88 1988–89 1989–90
6	Chris Gatling	1,811	1988–89 1989–90 1990–91
7	Ronnie McAdoo	1,776	1978–79 1979–80 1980–81 1981–82
8	Dave Twardzik	1,660	1969–70 1970–71 1971–72
9	Joel Copeland	1,657	1970–71 1971–72 1972–73 1973–74
10	Alex Loughton	1,646	2002–03 2003–04 2004–05 2005–06

Season
Rk	Player	Points	Season
1	Trey Freeman	838	2015–16

Single game
Rk	Player	Points	Season	Opponent
1	Bob Pritchett	67	1967–68	Richmond Prof. Inst.
2	Leo Anthony	60	1960–61	Lynchburg
3	Leo Anthony	48	1959–60	Elon
4	Bob Pritchett	47	1967–68	Hampden-Sydney
5	Bobby Hoffman	46	1961–62	Roanoke
6	Ricky Michaelson	45	1972–73	Kentucky Wesleyan
	Alex Loughton	45	2003–04	Charlotte
	Jordan Battle	45	2025–26	Georgia Southern
9	Joel Copeland	44	1973–74	Rollins
	Ronnie Valentine	44	1977–78	Tulane

== Rebounds ==
Career
Rk	Player	Rebounds	Seasons
1	Randy Leddy	1,153	1962–63 1963–64 1964–65 1965–66
2	Mark West	1,113	1979–80 1980–81 1981–82 1982–83
3	Odell Hodge	1,086	1992–93 1993–94 1994–95 1995–96 1996–97
4	Wilson Washington	1,011	1974–75 1975–76 1976–77
5	Kenny Gattison	963	1982–83 1983–84 1984–85 1985–86
6	Ronnie McAdoo	953	1978–79 1979–80 1980–81 1981–82
7	Alex Loughton	952	2002–03 2003–04 2004–05 2005–06
8	Ronnie Valentine	949	1976–77 1977–78 1978–79 1979–80
9	Joel Copeland	939	1970–71 1971–72 1972–73 1973–74
10	Frank Hassell	909	2007–08 2008–09 2009–10 2010–11

Season
Rk	Player	Rebounds	Season
1	Randy Leddy	443	1965–66

Single game
Rk	Player	Rebounds	Season	Opponent
1	Ron Drews	33	1966–67	Richmond Prof. Inst.

== Assists ==
Career
Rk	Player	Assists	Seasons
1	Frank Smith	883	1984–85 1985–86 1986–87 1987–88
2	Dave Twardzik	880	1969–70 1970–71 1971–72
3	Brion Dunlap	680	1994–95 1995–96 1996–97 1997–98
4	Joey Caruthers	619	1973–74 1974–75 1975–76 1976–77
5	Dick St. Clair	608	1967–68 1968–69 1969–70
6	Ahmad Caver	607	2015–16 2016–17 2017–18 2018–19
7	Grant Robinson	596	1979–80 1980–81 1981–82 1982–83
8	Drew Williamson	555	2003–04 2004–05 2005–06 2006–07
9	Donald Anderson	488	1989–90 1990–91 1991–92 1992–93
10	Oliver Purnell	476	1972–73 1973–74 1974–75

Season
Rk	Player	Assists	Season
1	Dave Twardzik	332	1970–71

Single game
Rk	Player	Assists	Season	Opponent
1	Dave Twardzik	20	1971–72	Mt. St. Mary's

== Steals ==
Career
Rk	Player	Steals	Seasons
1	Frank Smith	295	1984–85 1985–86 1986–87 1987–88
2	Kent Bazemore	250	2008–09 2009–10 2010–11 2011–12
3	Brandon Johnson	238	2004–05 2005–06 2006–07 2007–08
4	Drew Williamson	215	2003–04 2004–05 2005–06 2006–07
5	Mike Byers	189	1995–96 1996–97 1997–98 1998–99
	Ben Finney	189	2007–08 2008–09 2009–10 2010–11
7	Joey Caruthers	188	1973–74 1974–75 1975–76 1976–77
8	Ahmad Caver	187	2015–16 2016–17 2017–18 2018–19
9	Grant Robinson	184	1979–80 1980–81 1981–82 1982–83
10	Keith Thomas	160	1982–83 1983–84 1984–85 1985–86

Season
Rk	Player	Steals	Season
1	Brandon Johnson	91	2007–08

Single game
Rk	Player	Steals	Season	Opponent
1	Brandon Johnson	8	2006–07	George Mason
	Oliver Purnell	8	1974–75	Washington & Lee

== Blocks ==
Career
Rk	Player	Blocks	Seasons
1	Mark West	446	1979–80 1980–81 1981–82 1982–83
2	Wilson Washington	364	1974–75 1975–76 1976–77
3	Odell Hodge	286	1992–93 1993–94 1994–95 1995–96 1996–97
4	Cal Bowdler	219	1995–96 1996–97 1997–98 1998–99
5	Richard Ross	214	2010–11 2011–12 2012–13 2013–14 2014–15
6	Reggie Bassette	199	1995–96 1996–97 1997–98 1998–99
7	Chris Gatling	195	1988–89 1989–90 1990–91
8	Brandon Stith	157	2015–16 2016–17 2017–18
9	Frank Hassell	151	2007–08 2008–09 2009–10 2010–11
10	Kenny Gattison	126	1982–83 1983–84 1984–85 1985–86

Season
Rk	Player	Blocks	Season
1	Wilson Washington	165	1975–76

Single game
Rk	Player	Blocks	Season	Opponent
1	Wilson Washington	12	1975–76	W&M
	Wilson Washington	12	1974–75	Baptist College
