= 2017–18 Old Dominion Monarchs men's basketball team =

American college basketball season

2017–18 Old Dominion Monarchs men's basketball
- Conference: Conference USA
- Record: 25–7 (15–3 C-USA)
- Head coach: Jeff Jones (5th season)
- Assistant coaches: Kelvin Jefferson (2nd season); John Richardson (11th season); Bryant Stith
- Home arena: Ted Constant Convocation Center

2017–18 Conference USA men's basketball standings
	Conf.				Overall
Team	W		L	PCT	W		L	PCT
Middle Tennessee	16	–	2	.889	25	–	8	.758
Old Dominion	15	–	3	.833	25	–	7	.781
Western Kentucky	14	–	4	.778	27	–	11	.711
Marshall †	12	–	6	.667	25	–	11	.694
UTSA	11	–	7	.611	20	–	15	.571
UAB	10	–	8	.556	20	–	13	.606
North Texas	8	–	10	.444	20	–	18	.526
FIU	8	–	10	.444	14	–	18	.438
Southern Miss	7	–	11	.389	16	–	18	.471
Louisiana Tech	7	–	11	.389	17	–	16	.515
Florida Atlantic	6	–	12	.333	12	–	19	.387
UTEP	6	–	12	.333	11	–	20	.355
Rice	4	–	14	.222	7	–	24	.226
Charlotte	2	–	16	.111	6	–	23	.207
† 2018 C-USA Tournament winner

The 2017–18 Old Dominion Monarchs men’s basketball team represented Old Dominion University during the 2017–18 NCAA Division I men's basketball season. The Monarchs, led by fifth-year head coach Jeff Jones, played their home games at the Ted Constant Convocation Center in Norfolk, Virginia as members of Conference USA. They finished the season 25–7, 15–3 in C-USA play to finish in second place. They defeated Louisiana Tech in the quarterfinals of the C-USA Tournament before losing to Western Kentucky in the semifinals. Despite winning 25 games on the season, the Monarchs did not participate in a postseason tournament.

== Previous season ==
The Monarchs finished the 2016–17 season 19–12, 12–6 in C-USA play to finish tied for third place. They lost in the quarterfinals of the C-USA tournament to Marshall. ODU did not participate in a postseason tournament for the first time since the 2012–13 season.

== Offseason ==
=== Departures ===
Name	Number	Pos.	Height	Weight	Year	Hometown	Notes
Jordan Baker	0	G	6'2"	205	Senior	Hampton, VA	Graduated
Travis Fields Jr.	2	G	5'9"	150	Freshman	Portsmouth, VA	Transferred to Radford
Denzel Taylor	21	F	6'7"	220	Senior	Brampton, ON	Graduated
Zoran Talley	24	F	6'7"	200	RS-Sophomore	Merrillville, IN	Dismissed from team; transferred to Iowa State
Khary Mauras	30	G	5'11"	160	RS Freshman	Pottstown, PA	Walk-on; transferred to Bloomsburg (PA)

=== Incoming transfers ===
Name	Number	Pos.	Height	Weight	Year	Hometown	Previous School
Justice Kithcart	2	G	6'1"	215	Freshman	Durham, NC	Transferred from Pitt. Will be eligible in 2018–19
Greg McClinton	55	F	6'7"	200	RS-Junior	Winston-Salem, NC	Transferred from Wake Forest
Loren Brill	20	G	6'0"	180	Sophomore	Gaithersburg, MD	Transferred from Cal State Fullerton. Will be eligible in 2018–19. Will join the team as a walk-on.

=== 2017 recruiting class ===
College recruiting
Name	Hometown	School	Height	Weight	Commit date
Marquis Godwin #81 SG	Hampton, VA	Hampton High School	6 ft 5 in (1.96 m)	180 lb (82 kg)	Oct 27, 2016
Marquis Godwin #81 SG	Recruit ratings: Scout: Rivals: (65)				
Michael Hueitt Jr. #50 PG	High Point, NC	High Point Christian Academy	6 ft 3 in (1.91 m)	160 lb (73 kg)	Oct 2, 2016
Michael Hueitt Jr. #50 PG	Recruit ratings: Scout: Rivals: (78)				
Overall recruit ranking:
Note: In many cases, Scout, Rivals, 247Sports, On3, and ESPN may conflict in their listings of height and weight.; In these cases, the average was taken. ESPN grades are on a 100-point scale.; Sources: "Old Dominion 2017 Player Commits". ESPN.; "2017 Team Ranking". Rivals.

== Roster ==
2017–18 Old Dominion Monarchs men's basketball team
Players
Coaches

Pos.	#	Name	Height	Weight	Year	Previous school	Hometown
G	0	Marquis Godwin	6 ft 5 in (1.96 m)	185 lb (84 kg)	Fr	Hampton HS	Hampton, Virginia
F	1	Alassane Kah	6 ft 9 in (2.06 m)	215 lb (98 kg)	Sr	Walnut Ridge HS / Kilgore College	Columbus, Ohio
G	2	Justice Kithcart (redshirt)	6 ft 1 in (1.85 m)	175 lb (79 kg)	So	Virginia Episcopal School / Pittsburgh	Durham, North Carolina
G	3	B. J. Stith	6 ft 5 in (1.96 m)	215 lb (98 kg)	RS Jr	Oak Hill Academy / Virginia	Lawrenceville, Virginia
G	4	Ahmad Caver	6 ft 2 in (1.88 m)	170 lb (77 kg)	Jr	St. John's Northwestern Military Academy (WI)	Atlanta, Georgia
G	10	Xavier Green	6 ft 6 in (1.98 m)	180 lb (82 kg)	RS Fr	Williamsburg Christian Academy	Williamsburg, Virginia
G	11	Michael Hueitt Jr.	6 ft 3 in (1.91 m)	160 lb (73 kg)	Fr	Northwood Temple Academy	Fayetteville, North Carolina
G	12	Randy Haynes	6 ft 4 in (1.93 m)	215 lb (98 kg)	Sr	Potomac HS / New Mexico Junior College	Dumfries, Virginia
F	13	Aaron Carver	6 ft 7 in (2.01 m)	220 lb (100 kg)	RS So	South Kent School (CT)	Elizabeth City, North Carolina
F	15	Trey Porter	6 ft 10 in (2.08 m)	230 lb (104 kg)	RS Jr	Potomac HS / George Mason	Woodbridge, Virginia
G	20	Loren Brill (W) (redshirt)	6 ft 0 in (1.83 m)	190 lb (86 kg)	So	Georgetown Prep / Cal State Fullerton	Gaithersburg, Maryland
F	21	Alfis Pilavios	6 ft 6 in (1.98 m)	200 lb (91 kg)	RS Fr	Moraitis School	Athens, Greece
G	22	Keith Pinckney	6 ft 1 in (1.85 m)	180 lb (82 kg)	Sr	Miller Grove HS / Northwest Florida State College	Lithonia, Georgia
F	23	Stephen Vassor (W)	6 ft 7 in (2.01 m)	240 lb (109 kg)	RS Sr	Brunswick HS / Hampden–Sydney College	Lawrenceville, Virginia
F	25	Brandan Stith	6 ft 7 in (2.01 m)	240 lb (109 kg)	RS Sr	Brunswick HS / East Carolina	Lawrenceville, Virginia
F	55	Greg McClinton	6 ft 7 in (2.01 m)	200 lb (91 kg)	RS Sr	Hargrave Military Academy / Wake Forest	Winston-Salem, North Carolina

Head coach

- Jeff Jones (Virginia '82)

Assistant coach(es)

- Kelvin Jefferson (Southern Connecticut State '95)
- John Richardson (Elizabeth City State '95)
- Bryant Stith (Virginia '92)

Legend

- (C) Team captain
- (S) Suspended
- (I) Ineligible
- (W) Walk-on
- Injured
- Current redshirt

Roster
Last update: October 14, 2017

== Schedule and results ==
Date time, TV	Rank^{#}	Opponent^{#}	Result	Record	High points	High rebounds	High assists	Site (attendance) city, state
Exhibition
November 5, 2017*; 2:00 pm		Christopher Newport	W 101–46		17 – Haynes	11 – Br. Stith	9 – Caver	Ted Constant Convocation Center (1,924); Norfolk, VA
Non-conference regular season
November 10*; 7:00 pm		Towson	W 57–54	1–0	15 – Br. Stith	7 – Porter	3 – Tied	Ted Constant Convocation Center (6,279); Norfolk, VA
November 13*; 7:00 pm		at James Madison; Rivalry	W 69–53	2–0	19 – B.J. Stith	8 – Porter	4 – B.J. Stith	JMU Convocation Center (2,451); Harrisonburg, VA
November 16*; 2:00 pm, ESPN3		vs. Temple; Charleston Classic quarterfinals	L 65–76	2–1	15 – Green	7 – Carver	6 – Caver	TD Arena (2,136); Charleston, SC
November 17*; 1:30 pm, ESPNU		vs. Indiana State; Charleston Classic consolation	W 62–44	3–1	22 – Caver	12 – Carver	6 – Caver	TD Arena (1,970); Charleston, SC
November 19*; 3:30 pm, ESPN3		vs. Dayton; Charleston Classic 5th place game	W 75–67	4–1	25 – Haynes	13 – B.J. Stith	7 – Caver	TD Arena (2,340); Charleston, SC
November 25*; 7:00 pm		at William & Mary; Rivalry	L 77–79	4–2	26 – B.J. Stith	6 – Haynes	10 – Caver	Kaplan Arena (2,423); Williamsburg, VA
November 27*; 7:00 pm		Maryland Eastern Shore	W 83–44	5–2	14 – B.J. Stith	9 – Hueitt Jr.	4 – Green	Ted Constant Convocation Center (5,166); Norfolk, VA
December 2*; 7:00 pm		at VCU; Rivalry	L 75–82	5–3	18 – Haynes	8 – Stith	6 – Caver	Siegel Center (7,637); Richmond, VA
December 6*; 7:00 pm		Richmond	W 79–60	6–3	21 – B.J. Stith	10 – B.J. Stith	12 – Caver	Ted Constant Convocation Center (5,390); Norfolk, VA
December 9*; 7:00 pm		Bowling Green	W 88–46	7–3	21 – Br. Stith	11 – Br. Stith	8 – Caver	Ted Constant Convocation Center (5,000); Norfolk, VA
December 17*; 1:00 pm		at Fairfield	W 82–77 ^{OT}	8–3	30 – Caver	9 – Br. Stith	4 – Caver	Alumni Hall (2,410); Fairfield, CT
December 22*; 7:00 pm		vs. Norfolk State; Scope Series	W 61–50	9–3	17 – B.J. Stith	8 – 3 tied	6 – Caver	Norfolk Scope (6,711); Norfolk, VA
Conference USA regular season
December 30; 7:00 pm		Charlotte	W 89–58	10–3 (1–0)	22 – Caver	8 – Porter	8 – Caver	Ted Constant Convocation Center (5,660); Norfolk, VA
January 4, 2018; 8:00 pm		at Rice	W 82–75	11–3 (2–0)	26 – B.J. Stith	9 – B.J. Stith	10 – Caver	Tudor Fieldhouse (1,313); Houston, TX
January 6; 6:00 pm		at North Texas	W 63–60	12–3 (3–0)	23 – Porter	11 – Porter	3 – Caver	UNT Coliseum (1,907); Denton, TX
January 11; 8:00 pm, beIN		Western Kentucky	L 68–75	12–4 (3–1)	17 – B.J. Stith	11 – Br. Stith	4 – Caver	Ted Constant Convocation Center (6,895); Norfolk, VA
January 13; 7:00 pm		Marshall	W 82–76	13–4 (4–1)	20 – B.J. Stith	14 – Br. Stith	8 – Caver	Ted Constant Convocation Center (6,287); Norfolk, VA
January 18; 7:00 pm, ESPN3		at FIU	W 64–54	14–4 (5–1)	18 – Haynes	10 – Br. Stith	9 – Caver	FIU Arena (1,681); Miami, FL
January 21; 2:00 pm		at Florida Atlantic	W 73–62	15–4 (6–1)	17 – Caver	7 – Tied	6 – Green	FAU Arena (1,307); Boca Raton, FL
January 27; 7:00 pm		at Charlotte	W 88–66	16–4 (7–1)	24 – Haynes	17 – Br. Stith	3 – Tied	Dale F. Halton Arena (4,592); Charlotte, NC
February 1; 8:00 pm, Stadium		Middle Tennessee	L 59–66	16–5 (7–2)	14 – Haynes	7 – Haynes	4 – B.J. Stith	Ted Constant Convocation Center (7,297); Norfolk, VA
February 3; 7:00 pm		UAB	W 65–60	17–5 (8–2)	16 – Haynes	9 – Porter	7 – Caver	Ted Constant Convocation Center (6,481); Norfolk, VA
February 8; 8:00 pm		at Southern Miss	W 68–63	18–5 (9–2)	19 – B.J. Stith	9 – Haynes	7 – Caver	Reed Green Coliseum (1,984t); Hattiesburg, MS
February 10; 7:00 pm, Stadium		at Louisiana Tech	W 82–69	19–5 (10–2)	18 – B.J. Stith	5 – Tied	10 – Caver	Thomas Assembly Center (4,031); Ruston, LA
February 15; 8:00 pm, beIN		UTSA	W 100–62	20–5 (11–2)	36 – B.J. Stith	10 – B.J. Stith	10 – Caver	Ted Constant Convocation Center (5,813); Norfolk, VA
February 17; 7:00 pm		UTEP	W 82–33	21–5 (12–2)	24 – Haynes	8 – Br. Stith	7 – Caver	Ted Constant Convocation Center (6,902); Norfolk, VA
February 22; 7:00 pm, Stadium		at Marshall	W 84–79	22–5 (13–2)	21 – Br. Stith	12 – Br. Stith	4 – Haynes	Cam Henderson Center (5,829); Huntington, WV
February 24; 7:00 pm, Stadium		at Western Kentucky	L 66–88	22–6 (13–3)	15 – Caver	8 – Br. Stith	7 – Caver	E. A. Diddle Arena (7,387); Bowling Green, KY
March 1; 7:00 pm, ESPN3		Florida Atlantic	W 69–64	23–6 (14–3)	29 – Porter	12 – Porter	4 – Haynes	Ted Constant Convocation Center (6,673); Norfolk, VA
March 3; 7:00 pm		FIU	W 79–53	24–6 (15–3)	22 – Caver	13 – Porter	8 – Caver	Ted Constant Convocation Center (7,879); Norfolk, VA
Conference USA tournament
March 8; 9:30 pm, Stadium	(2)	vs. (10) Louisiana Tech; Quarterfinals	W 62–58	25–6	22 – B.J. Stith	12 – B.J. Stith	8 – Caver	Ford Center at The Star; Frisco, TX
March 9; 4:00 pm, CBSSN	(2)	vs. (3) Western Kentucky; Semifinals	L 49–57	25–7	17 – Porter	10 – Br. Stith	5 – Haynes	Ford Center at The Star; Frisco, TX
*Non-conference game. ^{#}Rankings from AP Poll. (#) Tournament seedings in parentheses. All times are in Eastern Time.
