= 1983 ECAC South men's basketball tournament =

- Classification: Division I
- Season: 1982–83
- Teams: 6
- Site: Robins Center; Richmond, VA
- Champions: James Madison (2nd title)
- Winning coach: Lou Campanelli (2nd title)
- MVP: Derek Steele (James Madison)
- ECAC South men's basketball tournaments

1982–83 ECAC South men's basketball standings
	Conf.				Overall
Team	W		L	PCT	W		L	PCT
William & Mary	9	–	0	1.000	20	–	9	.690
James Madison †	6	–	3	.667	20	–	11	.645
Navy	3	–	3	.500	18	–	11	.621
George Mason	3	–	6	.333	15	–	12	.556
East Carolina	3	–	7	.300	16	–	13	.552
Richmond	2	–	7	.222	12	–	16	.429
† 1983 ECAC South tournament winner Rankings from AP Poll

The 1983 ECAC South men's basketball tournament (now known as the Coastal Athletic Association men's basketball tournament) was held March 10–12 at the Robins Center in Richmond, Virginia.

The champion, James Madison, received an automatic bid to the 1983 NCAA tournament; it was JMU's third-ever NCAA Tournament berth. The runner-up, William & Mary, received an at-large bid to the 1983 National Invitation Tournament; it was W&M's first-ever postseason berth of any kind.

== Seeds ==
1983 ECAC South Men's Basketball Tournament seeds
Seed	School	Conference	Overall
1	William & Mary‡†	9–0	20–6
2	James Madison†	6–3	17–10
3	Navy	3–4	17–10
4	George Mason	3–6	15–11
5	East Carolina	3–7	15–12
6	Richmond	2–7	12–15
‡ – ECAC South regular season champions † – Received a bye in the conference tournament Overall records are as of the end of the regular season

== Bracket ==
Quarterfinals; Thursday, March 10
3	Navy	74
6	Richmond	69
4	George Mason	65
5	East Carolina	68

Semifinals; Friday, March 11
2	James Madison	72
3	Navy	58
1	William & Mary	48
5	East Carolina	45

Championship; Saturday, March 12
1	William & Mary	38
2	James Madison	41

== Awards and honors ==
Tournament MVP

- Derek Steele, James Madison

All-Tournament Team

- Keith Cieplicki, William & Mary
- Charles Green, East Carolina
- Kevin Richardson, William & Mary
- Dan Ruland, James Madison
- Derek Steele, James Madison
