= 1981 ECAC South men's basketball tournament =

- Classification: Division I
- Season: 1980–81
- Teams: 6
- Site: Hampton Coliseum; Hampton, VA
- Champions: James Madison (1st title)
- Winning coach: Lou Campanelli (1st title)
- MVP: Charles Fisher (James Madison)
- ECAC South men's basketball tournaments

1980–81 ECAC South men's basketball standings
	Conf.				Overall
Team	W		L	PCT	W		L	PCT
James Madison †	-	–	-	–	21	–	9	.700
Old Dominion	-	–	-	–	18	–	10	.643
St. Francis (PA)	-	–	-	–	17	–	10	.630
William & Mary	-	–	-	–	16	–	12	.571
Richmond	-	–	-	–	15	–	14	.517
Towson State	-	–	-	–	13	–	14	.481
George Mason	-	–	-	–	10	–	16	.385
Navy	-	–	-	–	9	–	16	.360
Robert Morris	-	–	-	–	9	–	18	.333
Baltimore	-	–	-	–	5	–	21	.192
Catholic University	-	–	-	–	4	–	20	.167
† 1981 ECAC South tournament winner Rankings from AP Poll

The 1981 ECAC South men's basketball tournament (now known as the Coastal Athletic Association men's basketball tournament) was held March 5–7 at the Hampton Coliseum in Hampton, Virginia.

James Madison defeated Richmond in the championship game, 69–60, to win their first ECAC South men's basketball tournament. The Dukes, therefore, earned an automatic bid to the 1981 NCAA tournament; this was JMU's first-ever bid to the NCAA tournament.

== Bracket ==
Quarterfinals, March 3, 1981; Hampton Coliseum, Hampton, VA
6	Robert Morris	50
3	William & Mary	73
5	Richmond	98
4	Saint Francis	78

Semifinals, March 5, 1981; Hampton Coliseum, Hampton, VA
3	William & Mary	42
2	James Madison	44
5	Richmond	79
1	Old Dominion	77

Finals, March 7, 1981; Hampton Coliseum, Hampton, VA
2	James Madison	69
5	Richmond	60
