= Bob Bockrath =

American college athletics administrator

Coaching career (HC unless noted)

Football
- 1965: Miami (OH) (GA)
- 1966: Slippery Rock (OL)
- 1967: Tippecanoe HS (OH)
- 1968–1972: Findlay HS (OH)
- 1973–1976: Arizona (OL)
- 1977–1978: Purdue (OL)
- 1979: Purdue (OC)

Administrative career (AD unless noted)
- 1980–1991: Arizona (asst. AD)
- 1991–1993: California
- 1993–1996: Texas Tech
- 1996–1999: Alabama
- 2000–2008: Yavapai College

Robert L. Bockrath is an American college athletics administrator who was the athletic director at California (1991–1993), Texas Tech (1993–1996), and Alabama (1996–1999).

== Playing and coach ==
A native of Columbus Grove, Ohio, Bockrath played football for Ara Parseghian at Miami of Ohio. He began his coaching career as a graduate assistant at Miami. After a year as an assistant at Slippery Rock, he became the head coach at Tippecanoe High School in Tipp City, Ohio. From 1968 to 1972, he compiled a 21–29 record as head coach of Findlay High School in Findlay, Ohio.

In December 1972, Arizona's new football coach, Jim Young, hired Bockrath as an assistant coach. The two had previously worked together in Miami. In 1977, Bockrath followed Young to Purdue.

== Administration ==
=== Arizona ===
Bockrath retired from coaching in 1980 to become the associate athletic director at Arizona. He succeeded Ken Droscher, who left the school to become the athletic director at UC Santa Barbara.

=== California ===
In 1991, Bockrath was named athletic director at California. Although he was considered a longshot, he was reportedly chosen over Cal's assistant AD Rick Greenspan and Idaho athletic director Gary Hunter because he had merged the men's and women's athletic departments at Arizona, something that Cal was going to do.

In 1992, Bockrath hired Keith Gilbertson to succeed Bruce Snyder as head football coach after Snyder accepted the head coaching position at Arizona State. Gilbertson lasted four seasons at Cal and had an overall record at Cal of 20–26.

On February 8, 1993, Bockrath fired men's basketball coach Lou Campanelli with ten games remaining in the season. He had inadvertently heard Campanelli give profanity-laced lectures to his players following losses to Arizona State and Arizona. Several players, including freshman Jason Kidd, had complained to Bockrath about his abrasive coaching style, but Bockrath said he had no idea how "beaten down" the players had been until then. Cal went 9–1 under interim coach Todd Bozeman, who was given a multi-year contract prior to the 1993 NCAA Division I men's basketball tournament. Campanelli sued Bockrath and vice-chancellor Daniel Boggan for libel, but his suit was dismissed by judge Fern M. Smith.

=== Texas Tech ===
On August 24, 1993, Bockrath was hired as the athletic director at Texas Tech. Under Bockrath, Tech won six Southwest Conference titles in major sports, expanded its athletic budget from $10 million to $14 million, and improved many of its facilities. He played a major role in raising funds for the construction of the United Supermarkets Arena.

Bockrath oversaw Tech's move to the newly-created Big 12 Conference. He, conference commissioner Steve Hatchell, Kansas AD Bob Frederick, and Oklahoma AD Donnie Duncan, inspected potential sites for the first Big 12 Championship Game. He also chaired a special subcommittee that studied revenue distribution.

=== Alabama ===
In 1996, Bockrath was selected over former Bear Bryant assistant Mal Moore and Houston AD Bill Carr to become the athletic director at Alabama. He succeeded Hootie Ingram, who resigned after the NCAA issued severe sanctions against the Alabama Crimson Tide football program. That December, he promoted defensive coordinator Mike DuBose to succeed the retiring Gene Stallings as head football coach. He fired men's basketball coach David Hobbs following a 15–16 1997–98 season and replaced him with Murray State's Mark Gottfried.

In August 1999, Bockrath chose not to fire DuBose after the university settled a sexual harassment suit against the coach. He instead voided DuBose's two year extension he received earlier that year. Following a 29–28 loss to Louisiana Tech, Bockrath and university officials reached an agreement on his departure. He resigned as AD effective September 21, 1999, but remained on the payroll as a consultant until June 30, 2000.

=== Yavapai College ===
From 2000 to 2008, Bockrath was the athletic director at Yavapai College, a community college in Yavapai County, Arizona.
