= 1980–81 James Madison Dukes men's basketball team =

American college basketball season

1980–81 James Madison Dukes men's basketball

ECAC South tournament champions

NCAA Tournament East Region 10 Seed, Second Round
- Conference: Eastern Collegiate Athletic Conference
- South
- Record: 21–9 (10-2 ECAC)
- Head coach: Lou Campanelli (9th season)
- Home arena: Godwin Hall

1980–81 ECAC South men's basketball standings
	Conf.				Overall
Team	W		L	PCT	W		L	PCT
James Madison †	-	–	-	–	21	–	9	.700
Old Dominion	-	–	-	–	18	–	10	.643
St. Francis (PA)	-	–	-	–	17	–	10	.630
William & Mary	-	–	-	–	16	–	12	.571
Richmond	-	–	-	–	15	–	14	.517
Towson State	-	–	-	–	13	–	14	.481
George Mason	-	–	-	–	10	–	16	.385
Navy	-	–	-	–	9	–	16	.360
Robert Morris	-	–	-	–	9	–	18	.333
Baltimore	-	–	-	–	5	–	21	.192
Catholic University	-	–	-	–	4	–	20	.167
† 1981 ECAC South tournament winner Rankings from AP Poll

The 1980–81 James Madison Dukes men's basketball team represented James Madison University during the 1980–81 NCAA Division I men's basketball season. The Dukes, led by ninth year head coach Lou Campanelli, played their home games at the on-campus Godwin Hall and were members of the southern division of the Eastern Collegiate Athletic Conference (ECAC).

The 1980–81 Dukes won the 1981 ECAC South tournament by beating Richmond and therefore received an automatic bid to the 1981 NCAA Division I basketball tournament. This was the first team from James Madison to make the NCAA Division I tournament. As the tenth-seed in the East Region, the Dukes beat Georgetown before being beaten in the second round by Notre Dame.

== Schedule and results ==
Date time, TV	Rank^{#}	Opponent^{#}	Result	Record	Site (attendance) city, state
Regular Season
November 28, 1980		at No. 17 St. John's; Lapchick Tournament Opening Round	L 58-67	0-1	Alumni Hall; Jamaica, NY
November 29, 1980		vs. Weber State	W 49-47	1-1	Alumni Hall; Jamaica, NY
December 2, 1980		Salisbury State	W 74-54	2-1	Godwin Hall; Harrisonburg, VA
December 6, 1980		West Virginia Tech	L 78-80	2-2	Godwin Hall; Harrisonburg, VA
December 10, 1981		at Baltimore	W 87-62	3-2	Baltimore Civic Center; Baltimore, MD
December 13, 1980		Rider	W 70-52	4-2	Godwin Hall; Harrisonburg, VA
December 19, 1980		vs. Texas A&M	L 47-51	4-3	Cassell Coliseum; Blacksburg, VA
December 20, 1980		vs. Pittsburgh	W 77-69	5-3	Cassell Coliseum; Blacksburg, VA
December 30, 1980		No. 3 Virginia	L 52-53	5-4	Godwin Hall (10,000); Harrisonburg, VA
January 3, 1981		at George Mason	W 54-37	6-4	GMU Fieldhouse; Fairfax, VA
January 7, 1981		North Carolina Wesleyan	W 97-57	7-4	Godwin Hall; Harrisonburg, VA
January 10, 1981		Richmond	W 92-73	8-4	Godwin Hall; Harrisonburg, VA
January 14, 1981		Baltimore	W 90-59	9-4	Godwin Hall; Harrisonburg, VA
January 17, 1981		at William & Mary	L 42-44	9-5	William & Mary Hall; Williamsburg, VA
January 21, 1981		Old Dominion; Rivalry	L 63-65 ^{2OT}	9-6	Godwin Hall; Harrisonburg, VA
January 24, 1981		George Mason	W 70-53	10-6	Godwin Hall; Harrisonburg, VA
January 26, 1981		at VCU	L 49-50	10-7	Richmond Coliseum; Richmond, VA
January 28, 1981		Navy	W 73-55	11-7	Godwin Hall; Harrisonburg, VA
January 31, 1981		Charleston Southern	W 77-52	12-7	Godwin Hall; Harrisonburg, VA
February 4, 1981		at Towson State	W 73-58	13-7	Towson Center; Towson, MD
February 7, 1981		William & Mary	W 72-60	14-7	Godwin Hall; Harrisonburg, VA
February 12, 1981		VCU	L 57-58	14-8	Godwin Hall; Harrisonburg, VA
February 18, 1981		at Old Dominion; Rivalry	W 73-65	15-8	Norfolk Scope; Norfolk, VA
February 21, 1981		Shippensburg	W 77-68	16-8	Godwin Hall; Harrisonburg, VA
February 25, 1981		Towson State	W 85-53	17-8	Godwin Hall; Harrisonburg, VA
February 28, 1981		at Richmond	W 69-63	18-8	Robins Center; Richmond, VA
ECAC South tournament
March 6, 1981	(2)	vs. (3) William & Mary; Semifinals	W 44-42	19-8	Hampton Coliseum; Hampton, VA
March 7, 1981	(2)	vs. (5) Richmond; Finals	W 69-60	20-8	Hampton Coliseum; Hampton, VA
NCAA tournament
March 12, 1981	(10 E)	vs. (7 E) Georgetown; First round	W 61-55	21-8	Providence Civic Center (8,273); Providence, RI
March 14, 1981	(10 E)	vs. (2 E) No. 7 Notre Dame; Quarterfinals	L 45-54	21-9	Providence Civic Center; Providence, RI
*Non-conference game. ^{#}Rankings from AP Poll. (#) Tournament seedings in parentheses. E=East. All times are in Eastern Time.
