= 1980–81 Old Dominion Monarchs basketball team =

American college basketball season

1980–81 Old Dominion Monarchs basketball

NIT, First Round
- Conference: ECAC South Conference
- Record: 18–10 ( ECAC South)
- Head coach: Paul Webb (6th season)
- Home arena: Norfolk Scope; Hampton Coliseum (alternate)

1980–81 ECAC South men's basketball standings
	Conf.				Overall
Team	W		L	PCT	W		L	PCT
James Madison †	-	–	-	–	21	–	9	.700
Old Dominion	-	–	-	–	18	–	10	.643
St. Francis (PA)	-	–	-	–	17	–	10	.630
William & Mary	-	–	-	–	16	–	12	.571
Richmond	-	–	-	–	15	–	14	.517
Towson State	-	–	-	–	13	–	14	.481
George Mason	-	–	-	–	10	–	16	.385
Navy	-	–	-	–	9	–	16	.360
Robert Morris	-	–	-	–	9	–	18	.333
Baltimore	-	–	-	–	5	–	21	.192
Catholic University	-	–	-	–	4	–	20	.167
† 1981 ECAC South tournament winner Rankings from AP Poll

The 1980–81 Old Dominion Monarchs basketball team represented Old Dominion University in the 1980–81 college basketball season. This was head coach Paul Webb's 6th season at Old Dominion. The Monarchs competed in the ECAC South Conference and played their home games at the Norfolk Scope in Norfolk, Virginia. They finished the season 18–10. They lost to Richmond in the first round of the ECAC South tournament. After receiving an invitation to the 1981 NIT, they lost to Georgia in the opening round.

== Roster ==
1980–81 Old Dominion Monarchs men's basketball team
Players	Coaches
Pos. / # / Name / Height / Weight / Year / Hometown; C / 45 / Mark West / 6 ft 10 in (2.08 m) / 220 lb (100 kg) / So / Petersburg, Virginia	Head coach: Paul Webb; Assistant coach(es) Legend: (C) Team captain; (S) Suspended; (I) Ineligible; (W) Walk-on; Injured; Current redshirt

== Schedule ==
Date time, TV	Rank^{#}	Opponent^{#}	Result	Record	Site city, state
Exhibition
Nov 4, 1980*		Poland	W 92–78		Norfolk Scope; Norfolk, Virginia
Regular season
Dec 3, 1980*		Texas Wesleyan	W 75–50	1–0	Norfolk Scope; Norfolk, Virginia
Dec 6, 1980*		Norfolk State	W 80–63	2–0	Norfolk Scope; Norfolk, Virginia
Dec 9, 1980*		at Duquesne	W 73–70	3–0	Civic Arena; Pittsburgh, Pennsylvania
Dec 13, 1980*		VCU	L 56–65	3–1	Norfolk Scope; Norfolk, Virginia
Dec 19, 1980*		vs. Alabama; Cable Car Classic	L 63–71	3–2	Toso Pavilion; Santa Clara, California
Dec 20, 1980*		at Santa Clara; Cable Clar Classic	W 72–71	4–2	Toso Pavilion; Santa Clara, California
Dec 29, 1980*		at Richmond; Times–Dispatch Invitational	W 71–64	5–2	Robins Center; Richmond, Virginia
Dec 30, 1980*		vs. VCU; Times–Dispatch Invitational	L 44–61	5–3	Robins Center; Richmond, Virginia
Jan 2, 1981*		Columbia	W 92–58	6–3	Norfolk Scope; Norfolk, Virginia
Jan 3, 1981*		American	L 75–79	6–4	Norfolk Scope; Norfolk, Virginia
Jan 8, 1981*		Richmond	W 89–76	7–4	Norfolk Scope; Norfolk, Virginia
Jan 10, 1981*		at No. 1 DePaul	W 63–62	8–4	Rosemont Horizon (14,858); Rosemont, Illinois
Jan 14, 1981*		at Boston University	W 78–71	9–4	
Jan 17, 1981*		Rhode Island	L 54–59	9–5	Norfolk Scope; Norfolk, Virginia
Jan 21, 1981		at James Madison; Rivalry	W 65–63 ^{2OT}	10–5	Godwin Hall; Harrisonburg, Virginia
Jan 24, 1981*		William & Mary	W 76–51	11–5	Norfolk Scope; Norfolk, Virginia
Jan 26, 1981*		Stetson	W 75–65	12–5	Norfolk Scope; Norfolk, Virginia
Jan 28, 1981*		East Carolina	W 76–67	13–5	Norfolk Scope; Norfolk, Virginia
Jan 30, 1981*		at Syracuse	L 58–71	13–6	Carrier Dome; Syracuse, New York
Feb 4, 1981*		George Mason	W 66–51	14–6	Norfolk Scope; Norfolk, Virginia
Feb 7, 1981*		Richmond	W 82–80 ^{OT}	15–6	Norfolk Scope; Norfolk, Virginia
Feb 10, 1981*		VCU; Times–Dispatch Invitational	L 64–75	15–7	Richmond Coliseum; Richmond, Virginia
Feb 14, 1981*		at Navy	W 72–63	16–7	
Feb 18, 1981		James Madison; Rivalry	L 65–73	16–8	Norfolk Scope; Norfolk, Virginia
Feb 21, 1981*		at William & Mary	W 60–59	17–8	
Feb 24, 1981*		Georgia State	W 96–61	18–8	Norfolk Scope; Norfolk, Virginia
ECAC South tournament
Mar 5, 1981*	(1)	(5) Richmond; Semifinals	L 77–79	18–9	Norfolk Scope; Norfolk, Virginia
NIT
Mar 11, 1981*		vs. Georgia; First Round	L 60–74	18–10	
*Non-conference game. ^{#}Rankings from AP poll. (#) Tournament seedings in parentheses. E=East. All times are in Eastern Time.
