= 1982–83 William & Mary Tribe men's basketball team =

American college basketball season

1982–83 William & Mary Tribe men's basketball

ECAC South Regular Season Champions

NIT, First Round
- Conference: Eastern College Athletic Conference
- South
- Record: 20–9 (9–0 ECAC South)
- Head coach: Bruce Parkhill (6th season)
- Home arena: William & Mary Hall

1982–83 ECAC South men's basketball standings
	Conf.				Overall
Team	W		L	PCT	W		L	PCT
William & Mary	9	–	0	1.000	20	–	9	.690
James Madison †	6	–	3	.667	20	–	11	.645
Navy	3	–	3	.500	18	–	11	.621
George Mason	3	–	6	.333	15	–	12	.556
East Carolina	3	–	7	.300	16	–	13	.552
Richmond	2	–	7	.222	12	–	16	.429
† 1983 ECAC South tournament winner Rankings from AP Poll

The 1982–83 William & Mary Tribe men's basketball team represented the College of William & Mary during the 1982–83 college basketball season. It was head coach Bruce Parkhill's sixth and final season at William & Mary before leaving for Penn State. The Tribe competed in the ECAC South and played their home games at Kaplan Arena. They finished the season 20–9 (9–0 in ECAC South competition) but lost in the championship game of the 1983 ECAC South men's basketball tournament to James Madison. They were invited to play in the 1983 National Invitation Tournament (the Tribe's first-ever postseason tournament bid and only one until 2010) where they lost in the first round to Virginia Tech. This season also marked the first-ever conference title for William & Mary's men's basketball program.

== Roster ==
#	Name	Games played	Total points	PPG
14	Keith Cieplicki	29	465	16.0
40	Brant Weidner	29	342	11.8
30	Tony Traver	29	317	10.9
32	Kevin Richardson	29	254	8.8
25	Mike Strayhorn	29	210	7.2
54	Gary Bland	29	113	3.9
44	Scott Coval	28	89	3.2
22	Neil McFarlane	9	29	3.2
10	Rich Cooper	14	27	1.9
52	Matt Brooks	29	54	1.9
50	Paul Kinley	4	4	1.0
20	Mike Bracken	7	7	1.0
12	Tom Lamb	8	7	0.9

== Schedule and results ==
- All times are Eastern

Date time, TV	Rank^{#}	Opponent^{#}	Result	Record	Site (attendance) city, state
1983 ECAC South men's basketball tournament
3/10/1983		vs. East Carolina; Semifinals	W 47–32	20–7	Robins Center; Richmond, Virginia
3/12/1983		vs. James Madison; Championship	L 38–41	20–8	Robins Center; Richmond, Virginia
1983 National Invitation tournament
3/17/1983		at Virginia Tech; First Round	L 79–85	20–9	Cassell Coliseum; Blacksburg, Virginia
*Non-conference game. ^{#}Rankings from AP Poll. (#) Tournament seedings in parentheses.
