= 1981–82 James Madison Dukes men's basketball team =

American college basketball season

1981–82 James Madison Dukes men's basketball

ECAC South regular season champions

NCAA tournament, Second Round
- Conference: Eastern Collegiate Athletic Conference
- South
- Record: 24–6 (10–1 ECAC)
- Head coach: Lou Campanelli (10th season)
- Home arena: James Madison University Convocation Center

1981–82 ECAC South men's basketball standings
	Conf.				Overall
Team	W		L	PCT	W		L	PCT
James Madison	10	–	1	.909	24	–	6	.800
Richmond	6	–	4	.600	18	–	11	.621
Old Dominion †	5	–	4	.556	18	–	12	.600
William & Mary	6	–	5	.545	16	–	12	.571
Towson State	5	–	7	.417	10	–	17	.370
Navy	2	–	4	.333	12	–	14	.462
St. Francis	2	–	5	.286	10	–	17	.370
George Mason	2	–	6	.250	13	–	14	.481
East Carolina	2	–	8	.200	10	–	17	.370
† 1982 ECAC South tournament winner Rankings from AP Poll

The 1981–82 James Madison Dukes men's basketball team represented James Madison University during the 1981–82 NCAA Division I men's basketball season. The Dukes, led by tenth year head coach Lou Campanelli, played their home games at the newly opened on-campus Convocation Center and were members of the southern division of the Eastern Collegiate Athletic Conference (ECAC).

The Dukes finished the season with a 24–6 (10–1 ECAC South) record, but were upset by Old Dominion in the ECAC South tournament. However, the Dukes received an at-large bid to the 1982 NCAA Division I men's basketball tournament for their second-ever and second-consecutive appearance in the tournament. In the NCAA Tournament, the ninth-seeded Dukes beat Ohio State in the first round before falling to eventual national champions North Carolina in the second round.

== Schedule ==
Date time, TV	Rank^{#}	Opponent^{#}	Result	Record	Site (attendance) city, state
Regular Season
November 28, 1981*		Whittier	W 77–54	1–0	JMU Convocation Center (2,750); Harrisonburg, VA
November 30, 1981*		Maryland Eastern Shore	W 79–43	2–0	James Madison University Convocation Center (4,250); Harrisonburg, VA
December 4, 1981*		Bucknell; JMU Invitational	W 59–43	3–0	James Madison University Convocation Center (4,500); Harrisonburg, VA
December 5, 1981*		Vermont; JMU Invitational	W 81–65	4–0	James Madison University Convocation Center (4,850); Harrisonburg, VA
December 8, 1981*		at VMI	W 64–43	5–0	Cameron Hall (1,300); Lexington, VA
December 12, 1981		at George Mason	W 67–60	6–0 (1–0)	PE Building (2,801); Fairfax, VA
December 19, 1981*		at VCU	W 47–45	7–0	Richmond Coliseum (4,500); Richmond, VA
December 29, 1981*		at VCU; Richmond Times-Disptach Invitational	W 54–46	8–0	Richmond Coliseum (10,716); Richmond, VA
December 30, 1981*		vs. Virginia; Richmond Times-Disptach Invitational	L 44–57	8–1	Richmond Coliseum (10,716); Richmond, VA
January 2, 1982*		at Virginia	L 65–73	8–2	University Hall (9,000); Charlottesville, VA
January 9, 1982		East Carolina	W 72–50	9–2 (2–0)	James Madison University Convocation Center (4,700); Harrisonburg, VA
January 11, 1981		at Richmond	L 51–56	9–3 (2–1)	Robins Center (6,947); Richmond, VA
January 14, 1982*		Towson State	W 76–48	10–3	James Madison University Convocation Center (4,500); Harrisonburg, VA
January 16, 1982		William & Mary	W 54–44	11–3 (3–1)	James Madison University Convocation Center (5,100); Harrisonburg, VA
January 20, 1982		Old Dominion; Rivalry	W 60–48	12–3 (4–1)	James Madison University Convocation Center (5,100); Harrisonburg, VA
January 23, 1982*		UNC Wilmington	W 72–55	13–3	James Madison University Convocation Center (4,950); Harrisonburg, VA
January 27, 1982		at Navy	W 59–49	14–3 (5–1)	Alumni Hall (Navy) (2,000); Annapolis, MD
January 30, 1982		George Mason	W 75–59	15–3 (6–1)	James Madison University Convocation Center (5,075); Harrisonburg, VA
February 3, 1982*		at Campbell	W 55–47	16–3	Carter Gymnasium (250); Buies Creek, NC
February 6, 1982*		VCU	L 66–68	16–4	James Madison University Convocation Center (5,100); Harrisonburg, VA
February 10, 1982*		at New Orleans	W 59–55	17–4	Human Performance Center (2,297); New Orleans, LA
February 13, 1982		Richmond	W 66–59	18–4 (7–1)	James Madison University Convocation Center (5,100); Harrisonburg, VA
February 17, 1982		at East Carolina	W 61–43	19–4 (8–1)	Williams Arena at Minges Coliseum (1,800); Greenville, NC
February 20, 1982		at William & Mary	W 56–55	20–4 (9–1)	Kaplan Arena (7,025); Williamsburg, VA
February 22, 1982*		Campbell	W 79–46	21–4	James Madison University Convocation Center (4,900); Harrisonburg, VA
February 27, 1982		at Old Dominion; Rivalry	W 43–41	22–4 (10–1)	Norfolk Scope (6,680); Norfolk, VA
ECAC South tournament
March 5, 1982*	(1)	vs. (4) William & Mary; Semifinals	W 64–49	23–4	Norfolk Scope (5,500); Norfolk, VA
March 6, 1982*	(1)	(3) Old Dominion; Championship	L 57–58	23–5	Norfolk Scope (7,500); Norfolk, VA
NCAA tournament
March 11, 1982*	(9E)	(8E) Ohio State; First Round	W 55–48	24–5	Charlotte Coliseum (11,200); Charlotte, NC
March 13, 1982*; CBS	(9E)	(1E) North Carolina; Second Round	L 50–52	24–6	Charlotte Coliseum (11,666); Charlotte, NC
*Non-conference game. ^{#}Rankings from AP Poll. (#) Tournament seedings in parentheses. All times are in Eastern Time.
