= 2016–17 Old Dominion Monarchs men's basketball team =

American college basketball season

2016–17 Old Dominion Monarchs men's basketball
- Conference: Conference USA
- Record: 19–12 (12–6 C-USA)
- Head coach: Jeff Jones (4th season)
- Assistant coaches: Kelvin Jefferson (1st season); John Richardson (10th season); Bryant Stith (4th season)
- Home arena: Ted Constant Convocation Center

2016–17 Conference USA men's basketball standings
| | Conf. | | | | Overall |
| Team | W | | L | PCT | W | | L | PCT |
|---|---|---|---|---|---|---|---|---|
| Middle Tennessee † | 17 | – | 1 | .944 | 31 | – | 5 | .861 |
| Louisiana Tech | 14 | – | 4 | .778 | 23 | – | 10 | .697 |
| Old Dominion | 12 | – | 6 | .667 | 19 | – | 12 | .613 |
| UTEP | 12 | – | 6 | .667 | 15 | – | 17 | .469 |
| Rice | 11 | – | 7 | .611 | 23 | – | 12 | .657 |
| Marshall | 10 | – | 8 | .556 | 20 | – | 15 | .571 |
| UAB | 9 | – | 9 | .500 | 17 | – | 16 | .515 |
| Western Kentucky | 9 | – | 9 | .500 | 15 | – | 17 | .469 |
| UTSA | 8 | – | 10 | .444 | 14 | – | 19 | .424 |
| Charlotte | 7 | – | 11 | .389 | 13 | – | 17 | .433 |
| Florida Atlantic | 6 | – | 12 | .333 | 10 | – | 20 | .333 |
| Southern Miss | 6 | – | 12 | .333 | 9 | – | 22 | .290 |
| FIU | 3 | – | 15 | .167 | 7 | – | 24 | .226 |
| North Texas | 2 | – | 16 | .111 | 8 | – | 22 | .267 |
† 2017 C-USA Tournament winner

The 2016–17 Old Dominion Monarchs men's basketball team represented Old Dominion University during the 2016–17 NCAA Division I men's basketball season. The Monarchs, led by fourth-year head coach Jeff Jones, played their home games at the Ted Constant Convocation Center in Norfolk, Virginia as members of Conference USA. They finished the season 19–12, 12–6 in C-USA play to finish in a tie for third place. They lost in the quarterfinals of the C-USA tournament to Marshall. Despite finishing with 19 wins, they did not participate in a postseason tournament.

== Previous season ==
The Monarchs finished the 2015–16 season 25–13, 12–6 in C-USA play to finish in a three-way tie for third place. They defeated Florida Atlantic, Louisiana Tech, and WKU to advance to the championship game of the C-USA tournament where they lost to Middle Tennessee. They received an invitation to the inaugural Vegas 16, where they defeated Tennessee Tech, UC Santa Barbara, and Oakland to become the Vegas 16 champions.

== Preseason ==
The Monarchs were picked to finish in fifth place in the preseason Conference USA poll.

=== Departures ===
| Name | Number | Pos. | Height | Weight | Year | Hometown | Notes |
|---|---|---|---|---|---|---|---|
| Aaron Bacote | 1 | G | 6'4" | 190 | Senior | Hampton, VA | Graduated |
| Martin Shaw | 2 | G | 6'0" | 170 | Senior | Hampton, VA | Walk-on; Graduated |
| Austin Colbert | 11 | F | 6'8" | 195 | Junior | Chesapeake, VA | Transferred to Hampton |
| Payton Pervier | 12 | C | 7'1" | 275 | RS Senior | Snohomish, WA | Dismissed from team |
| Trey Freeman | 20 | G | 6'2" | 180 | RS Senior | Virginia Beach, VA | Graduated |
| Ambrose Mosley | 22 | G | 6'2" | 185 | RS Junior | Jacksonville, FL | Dismissed from team; Transferred to UNC Wilmington |
| Nik Biberaj | 30 | F | 6'8" | 245 | RS Senior | Fairfax Station, VA | Walk on; Graduated |

=== Incoming transfers ===
| Name | Number | Pos. | Height | Weight | Year | Hometown | Previous School |
|---|---|---|---|---|---|---|---|
| Alassane Kah | 1 | F | 6'10" | 210 | Junior | Columbus, OH | Junior college transferred from Kilgore College |
| Randy Haynes | 12 | G | 6'4" | 215 | Junior | Dumfries, VA | Junior college transferred from New Mexico Junior College |
| Keith Pinckney | 22 | G | 6'2" | 185 | Junior | Lithonia, GA | Junior college transferred from Northwest Florida State College |

=== 2016 recruiting class ===
College recruiting
| Name | Hometown | School | Height | Weight | Commit date |
|---|---|---|---|---|---|
| Xavier Green #48 SG | Wlliamsburg, VA | Williamsburg Christian Academy | 6 ft 1 in (1.85 m) | 180 lb (82 kg) | Sep 27, 2015 |
| Xavier Green #48 SG | Recruit ratings: Scout: Rivals: (75) | | | | |
| Travis Fields Jr. #82 PG | Portsmouth, VA | I. C. Norcom High School | 5 ft 10 in (1.78 m) | 150 lb (68 kg) | Mar 14, 2016 |
| Travis Fields Jr. #82 PG | Recruit ratings: Scout: Rivals: (59) | | | | |
Overall recruit ranking:
Note: In many cases, Scout, Rivals, 247Sports, On3, and ESPN may conflict in their listings of height and weight.; In these cases, the average was taken. ESPN grades are on a 100-point scale.; Sources: "Old Dominion 2016 Player Commits". ESPN.; "2016 Team Ranking". Rivals.

== Roster ==
2016–17 Old Dominion Monarchs men's basketball team
Players
Coaches

| Pos. | # | Name | Height | Weight | Year | Previous school | Hometown |
|---|---|---|---|---|---|---|---|
| G | 0 | Jordan Baker | 6 ft 2 in (1.88 m) | 205 lb (93 kg) | Sr | Hampton HS | Hampton, Virginia |
| F | 1 | Alassane Kah | 6 ft 9 in (2.06 m) | 200 lb (91 kg) | Jr | Walnut Ridge HS / Kilgore College | Columbus, Ohio |
| G | 2 | Travis Fields Jr. (W) | 5 ft 9 in (1.75 m) | 150 lb (68 kg) | Fr | I.C. Norcom HS | Portsmouth, Virginia |
| G | 3 | B. J. Stith | 6 ft 5 in (1.96 m) | 210 lb (95 kg) | RS So | Oak Hill Academy / Virginia | Lawrenceville, Virginia |
| G | 4 | Ahmad Caver | 6 ft 2 in (1.88 m) | 170 lb (77 kg) | So | St. John's Northwestern Military Academy (WI) | Atlanta, Georgia |
| G | 10 | Xavier Green | 6 ft 4 in (1.93 m) | 190 lb (86 kg) | Fr | Williamsburg Christian Academy | Williamsburg, Virginia |
| G | 12 | Randy Haynes | 6 ft 4 in (1.93 m) | 215 lb (98 kg) | Jr | Potomac HS / New Mexico Junior College | Dumfries, Virginia |
| F | 13 | Aaron Carver | 6 ft 7 in (2.01 m) | 210 lb (95 kg) | RS Fr | South Kent School (CT) | Elizabeth City, North Carolina |
| F | 15 | Trey Porter | 6 ft 10 in (2.08 m) | 205 lb (93 kg) | RS So | Potomac HS / George Mason | Woodbridge, Virginia |
| F | 21 | Denzell Taylor (C) | 6 ft 7 in (2.01 m) | 220 lb (100 kg) | Sr | St. Benedict's Prep (NJ) | Brampton, Ontario |
| G | 22 | Keith Pinckney | 6 ft 1 in (1.85 m) | 185 lb (84 kg) | Jr | Miller Grove HS / Northwest Florida State College | Lithonia, Georgia |
| F | 23 | Stephen Vassor (W) | 6 ft 7 in (2.01 m) | 240 lb (109 kg) | RS Jr | Brunswick HS / Hampden–Sydney College | Lawrenceville, Virginia |
| F | 24 | Zoran Talley | 6 ft 7 in (2.01 m) | 200 lb (91 kg) | RS So | Midwest Elite Preparatory Academy | Merrillville, Indiana |
| F | 25 | Brandan Stith | 6 ft 7 in (2.01 m) | 240 lb (109 kg) | RS Jr | Brunswick HS / East Carolina | Lawrenceville, Virginia |
| G | 30 | Khary Mauras (W) | 5 ft 11 in (1.8 m) | 160 lb (73 kg) | RS Fr | Reading HS | Pottstown, Pennsylvania |

Head coach

- Jeff Jones (Virginia '82)

Assistant coach(es)

- Kelvin Jefferson (Southern Connecticut '95)
- John Richardson (Elizabeth City State '95)
- Bryant Stith (Virginia '92)

Legend

- (C) Team captain
- (S) Suspended
- (I) Ineligible
- (W) Walk-on
- Injured
- Current redshirt

Roster
Last update: November 27, 2016

== Schedule and results ==
| Date time, TV | Rank^{#} | Opponent^{#} | Result | Record | High points | High rebounds | High assists | Site (attendance) city, state |
Spain Trip
| August 18* | | vs. Madrid All-Stars | L 64–65 | | 14 – Br. Stith | 9 – Tied | – | Pabellón Felipe Reyes; Getafe, Spain |
| August 20* | | vs. Madrid All-Stars | W 83–53 | | 17 – Br. Stith | 10 – Br. Stith | 5 – Caver | Pabellón Felipe Reyes; Getafe, Spain |
| August 22* | | vs. Union Sportive Toulouges (France) | W 55–40 | | 11 – Caver | 12 – Br. Stith | 2 – Tied | Pavelló Esportiu Municipal; Sant Julià de Vilatorta, Spain |
| August 23* | | vs. Catalan All-Stars | W 85–48 | | 12 – Tied | 9 – Tied | 3 – Tied | Pavelló Esportiu Municipal; Sant Julià de Vilatorta, Spain |
Exhibition
| November 2*; 7:00 pm | | Virginia State | W 71–32 | | 16 – Talley | 9 – Br. Stith | 3 – Tied | Ted Constant Convocation Center (3,163); Norfolk, VA |
| November 4*; 7:00 pm | | Virginia Wesleyan | W 89–55 | | 15 – Tied | 11 – Br. Stith | 5 – Caver | Ted Constant Convocation Center (3,843); Norfolk, VA |
Non-conference regular season
| November 11*; 7:00 pm | | James Madison; Rivalry | W 62–55 | 1–0 | 23 – Br. Stith (1) | 11 – Br. Stith (1) | 4 – Tied | Ted Constant Convocation Center (8,241); Norfolk, VA |
| November 14*; 7:00 pm | | at Richmond | W 64–61 | 2–0 | 13 – Caver (1) | 9 – Taylor (1) | 3 – Caver (2) | Robins Center (5,028); Richmond, VA |
| November 23*; 9:30 pm, AXS TV | | vs. #10 Louisville; Battle 4 Atlantis quarterfinals | L 62–68 ^{OT} | 2–1 | 22 – Br. Stith (2) | 12 – Tied | 4 – Baker (1) | Imperial Arena (1,601); Nassau, Bahamas |
| November 24*; 9:30 pm, AXS TV | | vs. LSU; Battle 4 Atlantis consolation round | L 60–66 | 2–2 | 11 – Caver (2) | 12 – Br. Stith (3) | 4 – Caver (3) | Imperial Arena (1,060); Nassau, Bahamas |
| November 25*; 9:30 pm, AXS TV | | vs. St. John's; Battle 4 Atlantis 7th place game | W 63–55 | 3–2 | 15 – Caver (3) | 16 – Taylor (3) | 6 – Caver (4) | Imperial Arena (969); Nassau, Bahamas |
| November 30*; 7:00 pm | | Dartmouth | W 59–47 | 4–2 | 14 – Tied | 10 – Porter (1) | 5 – Caver (5) | Ted Constant Convocation Center (5,260); Norfolk, VA |
| December 3*; 2:00 pm | | at Towson | W 60–58 | 5–2 | 15 – B.J. Stith (1) | 11 – Taylor (4) | 4 – Tied | SECU Arena (1,871); Towson, MD |
| December 6*; 7:00 pm | | at Rhode Island | L 39–51 | 5–3 | 14 – Br. Stith (3) | 13 – Br. Stith (4) | 2 – Br. Stith (1) | Ryan Center (4,250); Kingston, RI |
| December 10*; 8:00 pm, ASN | | VCU; Rivalry | L 64–67 | 5–4 | 17 – B.J. Stith (2) | 9 – Br. Stith (5) | 5 – Baker (2) | Ted Constant Convocation Center (8,472); Norfolk, VA |
| December 18*; 2:00 pm | | Georgia State | W 58–46 | 6–4 | 16 – Caver (5) | 8 – Tied | 3 – 3 tied | Ted Constant Convocation Center (4,052); Norfolk, VA |
| December 22*; 7:00 pm | | Howard | W 65–46 | 7–4 | 18 – Talley (1) | 12 – Br. Stith (7) | 9 – Caver (8) | Ted Constant Convocation Center (4,665); Norfolk, VA |
| December 29*; 7:00 pm | | William & Mary; Rivalry | L 54–65 | 7–5 | 10 – Talley (2) | 11 – Taylor (6) | 3 – Caver (9) | Ted Constant Convocation Center (7.151); Norfolk, VA |
Conference USA regular season
| December 31; 1:00 pm | | Rice | W 62–56 | 8–5 (1–0) | 18 – B.J. Stith (3) | 10 – Br. Stith (8) | 4 – Caver (10) | Ted Constant Convocation Center (5,431); Norfolk, VA |
| January 2; 5:00 pm | | North Texas | W 55–48 | 9–5 (2–0) | 14 – Caver (6) | 10 – Br. Stith (9) | 6 – Caver (11) | Ted Constant Convocation Center (5,123); Norfolk, VA |
| January 5; 7:00 pm | | at Marshall | L 86–90 ^{OT} | 9–6 (2–1) | 26 – Caver (7) | 11 – Taylor (7) | 3 – Tied | Cam Henderson Center (4,573); Huntington, WV |
| January 7; 6:00 pm, ASN | | at Western Kentucky | W 79–67 | 10–6 (3–1) | 22 – B.J. Stith (4) | 13 – Porter (2) | 4 – Caver (13) | E. A. Diddle Arena (4,122); Bowling Green, KY |
| January 12; 7:00 pm | | Southern Miss | W 54–50 | 11–6 (4–1) | 14 – B.J. Stith (5) | 9 – Taylor (8) | 3 – Tied | Ted Constant Convocation Center (6,523); Norfolk, VA |
| January 14; 4:00 pm, ASN | | Louisiana Tech | L 63–75 | 11–7 (4–2) | 17 – B.J. Stith (6) | 5 – Caver (1) | 9 – Caver (14) | Ted Constant Convocation Center (6,564); Norfolk, VA |
| January 21; 8:00 pm, ASN | | at Charlotte | L 72–74 | 11–8 (4–3) | 25 – Caver (8) | 12 – Talley (1) | 5 – Caver (15) | Dale F. Halton Arena (5,650); Charlotte, NC |
| January 26; 8:00 pm, CI | | at Rice | W 80–72 | 12–8 (5–3) | 18 – Br. Stith (4) | 11 – Br. Stith (10) | 8 – Caver (16) | Tudor Fieldhouse (1,460); Houston, TX |
| January 28; 3:00 pm | | at North Texas | W 73–67 | 13–8 (6–3) | 18 – Tied | 6 – Talley (2) | 4 – Caver (17) | The Super Pit (1,647); Denton, TX |
| February 2; 7:00 pm, ESPN3 | | FIU | W 64–57 | 14–8 (7–3) | 15 – B.J. Stith (7) | 7 – Porter (3) | 6 – Caver (18) | Ted Constant Convocation Center (5,757); Norfolk, VA |
| February 4; 7:00 pm, ESPN3 | | Florida Atlantic | L 61–65 | 14–9 (7–4) | 14 – Br. Stith (5) | 10 – Porter (4) | 3 – Tied | Ted Constant Convocation Center (6,985); Norfolk, VA |
| February 9; 8:00 pm, beIN | | at Middle Tennessee | L 51–64 | 14–10 (7–5) | 17 – B.J. Stith (8) | 10 – Taylor (9) | 3 – Tied | Murphy Center (6,209); Murfreesboro, TN |
| February 11; 8:00 pm, ASN | | at UAB | W 83–62 | 15–10 (8–5) | 23 – Caver (10) | 10 – B.J. Stith (1) | 8 – Caver (20) | Bartow Arena (4,185); Birmingham, AL |
| February 18; 7:00 pm, ESPN3 | | Charlotte | W 72–48 | 16–10 (9–5) | 17 – Tied | 9 – Br. Stith (11) | 8 – Caver (21) | Ted Constant Convocation Center (7,090); Norfolk, VA |
| February 23; 8:00 pm, beIN | | Marshall | W 86–65 | 17–10 (10–5) | 17 – B.J. Stith (9) | 8 – Porter (5) | 8 – Caver (22) | Ted Constant Convocation Center (6,248); Norfolk, VA |
| February 25; 7:00 pm, ESPN3 | | Western Kentucky | W 67−53 | 18−10 (11−5) | 15 – Caver (12) | 8 – Taylor (10) | 6 – Tied | Ted Constant Convocation Center (7,355); Norfolk, VA |
| March 2; 8:00 pm, beIN | | at UTEP | W 62−61 | 19−10 (12−5) | 17 – Talley (5) | 9 – Taylor (11) | 5 – Baker (5) | Don Haskins Center (8,663); El Paso, TX |
| March 4; 4:00 pm | | at UTSA | L 55–73 | 19–11 (12–6) | 13 – B.J. Stith (10) | 8 – Br. Stith (12) | 7 – Caver (24) | Convocation Center (1,431); San Antonio, TX |
Conference USA tournament
| March 9; 9:00 pm, ASN | (3) | vs. (6) Marshall; Quarterfinals | L 63–64 | 19–12 | 12 – Tied | 12 – Br. Stith (13) | 6 – Caver (25) | Legacy Arena (4,005); Birmingham, AL |
*Non-conference game. ^{#}Rankings from AP Poll. (#) Tournament seedings in parentheses. All times are in Eastern Time.
