= 1982 ECAC South men's basketball tournament =

- Classification: Division I
- Season: 1981–82
- Teams: 7
- Site: Norfolk Scope; Norfolk, VA
- Champions: Old Dominion (2nd title)
- Winning coach: Paul Webb (2nd title)
- MVP: Mark West (Old Dominion)
- ECAC South men's basketball tournaments

1981–82 ECAC South men's basketball standings
	Conf.				Overall
Team	W		L	PCT	W		L	PCT
James Madison	10	–	1	.909	24	–	6	.800
Richmond	6	–	4	.600	18	–	11	.621
Old Dominion †	5	–	4	.556	18	–	12	.600
William & Mary	6	–	5	.545	16	–	12	.571
Towson State	5	–	7	.417	10	–	17	.370
Navy	2	–	4	.333	12	–	14	.462
St. Francis	2	–	5	.286	10	–	17	.370
George Mason	2	–	6	.250	13	–	14	.481
East Carolina	2	–	8	.200	10	–	17	.370
† 1982 ECAC South tournament winner Rankings from AP Poll

The 1982 ECAC South men's basketball tournament (now known as the Coastal Athletic Association men's basketball tournament) was held March 4–6 at the Norfolk Scope in Norfolk, Virginia.

Old Dominion upset top-seeded James Madison in the championship game, 58–57, to win their second ECAC South men's basketball tournament. The Monarchs, therefore, earned an automatic bid to the 1982 NCAA tournament. JMU would ultimately also receive an at-large bid.

== Bracket ==
Quarterfinals; Thursday, March 4
5	Navy	55
4	William & Mary	79
3	Old Dominion	70
6	George Mason	62
7	East Carolina	42
2	Richmond	49

Semifinals; Friday, March 5
1	James Madison	64
4	William & Mary	49
3	Old Dominion	77
2	Richmond	69

Championship; Saturday, March 6
1	James Madison	57
3	Old Dominion	58
