= 1982–83 James Madison Dukes men's basketball team =

American college basketball season

1982–83 James Madison Dukes men's basketball

ECAC South tournament champions

NCAA tournament, Second Round
- Conference: Eastern Collegiate Athletic Conference
- South
- Record: 20–11 (6–3 ECAC)
- Head coach: Lou Campanelli (11th season)
- Home arena: James Madison University Convocation Center

1982–83 ECAC South men's basketball standings
	Conf.				Overall
Team	W		L	PCT	W		L	PCT
William & Mary	9	–	0	1.000	20	–	9	.690
James Madison †	6	–	3	.667	20	–	11	.645
Navy	3	–	3	.500	18	–	11	.621
George Mason	3	–	6	.333	15	–	12	.556
East Carolina	3	–	7	.300	16	–	13	.552
Richmond	2	–	7	.222	12	–	16	.429
† 1983 ECAC South tournament winner Rankings from AP Poll

The 1982–83 James Madison Dukes men's basketball team represented James Madison University during the 1982–83 NCAA Division I men's basketball season. The Dukes, led by 11th-year head coach Lou Campanelli, played their home games at the on-campus Convocation Center and were members of the southern division of the Eastern Collegiate Athletic Conference (ECAC).

The Dukes finished the season with a 20–11 (6–3 ECAC South) record and won the ECAC South tournament. The Dukes received an automatic bid to the 1983 NCAA Division I men's basketball tournament for their third ever and third consecutive appearance in the tournament. In the NCAA Tournament, the tenth-seeded Dukes beat West Virginia in the first round before falling to North Carolina in the second round.

== Roster ==
1982–83 James Madison Dukes men's basketball team
Players
Coaches

Pos.	#	Name	Height	Weight	Year	Hometown
G	10	Troy Keys	5 ft 11 in (1.8 m)	—	Jr	Harrisburg, Pennsylvania
G	12	Charles Fisher	6 ft 2 in (1.88 m)	—	Sr	Cape Charles, Virginia
G	14	David Dupont	6 ft 5 in (1.96 m)	—	Sr	Greensboro, North Carolina
G/F	20	Jimmy Masloff	6 ft 5 in (1.96 m)	—	So	Charlottesville, Virginia
F	22	Darrell Jackson	6 ft 6 in (1.98 m)	—	So	Richmond, Virginia
G/F	24	William Hughes	6 ft 4 in (1.93 m)	—	Fr	Beltsville, Maryland
G	25	Derek Steele	5 ft 9 in (1.75 m)	—	Jr	Alexandria, Virginia
F	30	Tracy Williams	6 ft 6 in (1.98 m)	—	Fr	Beaufort, North Carolina
F/C	32	Keith Bradley	6 ft 7 in (2.01 m)	—	Jr	Chesterfield, Virginia
F	33	Woody Boler	6 ft 7 in (2.01 m)	—	Jr	Salisbury, North Carolina
F	34	Greg Mosten	6 ft 7 in (2.01 m)	—	So	Harrisburg, Pennsylvania
F	35	Todd Banks	6 ft 5 in (1.96 m)	—	Fr	Bellport, New York
F	40	Dan Ruland	6 ft 8 in (2.03 m)	240 lb (109 kg)	Sr	Annapolis, Maryland
F	42	Bob Donohoe	6 ft 8 in (2.03 m)	—	Sr	Bethesda, Maryland
F/C	44	Eric Esch	6 ft 9 in (2.06 m)	—	Fr	Whitestone, New York

Head coach

- Lou Campanelli

Assistant coach(es)

Legend

- (C) Team captain
- (S) Suspended
- (I) Ineligible
- (W) Walk-on
- Injured
- Current redshirt

Roster

== Schedule ==
Date time, TV	Rank^{#}	Opponent^{#}	Result	Record	Site (attendance) city, state
Regular Season
Nov 28, 1982*		VMI	W 58–33	1–0	JMU Convocation Center; Harrisonburg, Virginia
Dec 1, 1982*		No. 1 Virginia	L 34–51	1–1	JMU Convocation Center (7,700); Harrisonburg, Virginia
Dec 8, 1982*		vs. Maine	W 58–53	2–1	
ECAC South tournament
Mar 11, 1983*		vs. Navy; Semifinals	W 72–58	18–10	Robins Center; Richmond, Virginia
Mar 12, 1983*		vs. William & Mary; Championship game	W 41–38	19–10	Robins Center; Richmond, Virginia
NCAA tournament
Mar 17, 1983*	(10 E)	vs. (7 E) West Virginia; First round	W 57–50	20–10	Greensboro Coliseum; Greensboro, North Carolina
Mar 19, 1983*	(10 E)	vs. (2 E) No. 8 North Carolina; Second round	L 49–68	20–11	Greensboro Coliseum; Greensboro, North Carolina
*Non-conference game. ^{#}Rankings from AP Poll. (#) Tournament seedings in parentheses. All times are in Eastern Time.

== Awards and honors ==
- Dan Ruland – CAA co-Player of the Year
