= 1981–82 Old Dominion Monarchs basketball team =

American college basketball season

1981–82 Old Dominion Monarchs basketball

ECAC South tournament champions

NCAA tournament, First Round
- Conference: ECAC South Conference
- Record: 18–12 (5–4 ECAC South)
- Head coach: Paul Webb (7th season)
- Home arena: Norfolk Scope; Hampton Coliseum (alternate)

1981–82 ECAC South men's basketball standings
	Conf.				Overall
Team	W		L	PCT	W		L	PCT
James Madison	10	–	1	.909	24	–	6	.800
Richmond	6	–	4	.600	18	–	11	.621
Old Dominion †	5	–	4	.556	18	–	12	.600
William & Mary	6	–	5	.545	16	–	12	.571
Towson State	5	–	7	.417	10	–	17	.370
Navy	2	–	4	.333	12	–	14	.462
St. Francis	2	–	5	.286	10	–	17	.370
George Mason	2	–	6	.250	13	–	14	.481
East Carolina	2	–	8	.200	10	–	17	.370
† 1982 ECAC South tournament winner Rankings from AP Poll

The 1981–82 Old Dominion Monarchs basketball team represented Old Dominion University in the 1981–82 college basketball season. This was head coach Paul Webb's 7th season at Old Dominion. The Monarchs competed in the ECAC South Conference and played their home games at the ODU Fieldhouse. They finished the season 18–12, 5–4 in ECAC South play to finish in third place during the regular season. They won the ECAC South tournament to earn an automatic bid to the NCAA tournament. As No. 10 seed in the East Region where they were beaten by 7 seed Wake Forest in the opening round.

== Roster ==
1981–82 Old Dominion Monarchs men's basketball team
Players
Coaches

Pos.	#	Name	Height	Weight	Year	Hometown
F		Mark Davis	6 ft 6 in (1.98 m)	190 lb (86 kg)	Fr	Chesapeake, Virginia
C	45	Mark West	6 ft 10 in (2.08 m)	220 lb (100 kg)	Jr	Petersburg, Virginia

Head coach

- Paul Webb

Assistant coach(es)

Legend

- (C) Team captain
- (S) Suspended
- (I) Ineligible
- (W) Walk-on
- Injured
- Current redshirt

== Schedule and results ==
Date time, TV	Rank^{#}	Opponent^{#}	Result	Record	Site (attendance) city, state
Exhibition
Nov 23, 1981*		Belgrade-Yugoslavia	W 88–76		Norfolk Scope (6,066); Norfolk, Virginia
Regular season
Dec 1, 1981*		Maryland Eastern Shore	W 84–57	1–0	Norfolk Scope (5,746); Norfolk, Virginia
Dec 3, 1981*		Norfolk State	W 76–61	2–0	Norfolk Scope (8,900); Norfolk, Virginia
Dec 5, 1981*		at Rhode Island	W 62–56	3–0	Keaney Gymnasium (4,695); Kingston, Rhode Island
Dec 9, 1981*		Marquette	L 70–75 ^{OT}	3–1	Norfolk Scope (7,259); Norfolk, Virginia
Dec 12, 1981*		at Virginia Tech	L 72–100	3–2	Cassell Coliseum (9,850); Blacksburg, Virginia
Dec 19, 1981*		at Dayton	L 77–78 ^{OT}	3–3	UD Arena (9,240); Dayton, Ohio
Dec 22, 1981*		at VCU	L 55–61	3–4	Richmond Coliseum (3,700); Richmond, Virginia
Jan 4, 1982*		Howard	W 93–65	4–4	Norfolk Scope (3,952); Norfolk, Virginia
Jan 8, 1982*		Colgate; ODU Classic	W 70–47	5–4	Norfolk Scope (4,145); Norfolk, Virginia
Jan 9, 1982*		Wagner; ODU Classic	W 72–61	6–4	Norfolk Scope (5,543); Norfolk, Virginia
Jan 13, 1982*		at VMI	W 88–51	7–4	Cameron Hall (700); Lexington, Virginia
Jan 16, 1982*		No. 4 DePaul	L 60–70	7–5	Norfolk Scope (10,253); Norfolk, Virginia
Jan 20, 1982		at James Madison; Rivalry	L 48–60	7–6 (0–1)	JMU Convocation Center (5,100); Harrisonburg, Virginia
Jan 23, 1982		at William & Mary	L 59–60 ^{OT}	7–7 (0–2)	Kaplan Arena (7,000); Williamsburg, Virginia
Jan 25, 1982*		Duquesne	L 75–79	7–8	Norfolk Scope (5,510); Norfolk, Virginia
Jan 27, 1982		George Mason	W 71–63	8–8 (1–2)	Norfolk Scope (3,719); Norfolk, Virginia
Jan 30, 1982*		VCU	W 61–58	9–8	Norfolk Scope (6,607); Norfolk, Virginia
Feb 1, 1982*		Boston University	W 71–61	10–8	Norfolk Scope (5,897); Norfolk, Virginia
Feb 3, 1982		Richmond	W 80–57	11–8 (2–2)	Norfolk Scope (5,789); Norfolk, Virginia
Feb 6, 1982*		at Saint Joseph's	L 63–69	11–9	Alumni Memorial Fieldhouse (4,834); Philadelphia, Pennsylvania
Feb 10, 1982		at East Carolina	W 80–73	12–9 (3–2)	Williams Arena at Minges Coliseum (2,750); Greenville, North Carolina
Feb 13, 1982		Navy	W 81–55	13–9 (4–2)	Norfolk Scope (6,599); Norfolk, Virginia
Feb 17, 1982		William & Mary	W 66–45	14–9 (5–2)	Norfolk Scope (6,586); Norfolk, Virginia
Feb 20, 1982*		at Stetson	W 68–66	15–9	Edmunds Center (3,510); DeLand, Florida
Feb 22, 1982		at Richmond	L 62–63	15–10 (5–3)	Robins Center (4,527); Richmond, Virginia
Feb 27, 1982		James Madison; Rivalry	L 41–43	15–11 (5–4)	Norfolk Scope (6,680); Norfolk, Virginia
ECAC South tournament
Mar 4, 1982*	(3)	(6) George Mason; Quarterfinals	W 70–62	16–11	Norfolk Scope (4,500); Norfolk, Virginia
Mar 5, 1982*	(3)	vs. (2) Richmond; Semifinals	W 77–69	17–11	Norfolk Scope (5,500); Norfolk, Virginia
Mar 6, 1982*	(3)	(1) James Madison; Championship game	W 58–57	18–11	Norfolk Scope (7,500); Norfolk, Virginia
NCAA tournament
Mar 11, 1982*	(10 E)	vs. (7 E) No. 18 Wake Forest; First round	L 57–74	18–12	Charlotte Coliseum (11,220); Charlotte, North Carolina
*Non-conference game. ^{#}Rankings from AP poll. (#) Tournament seedings in parentheses. E=East. All times are in Eastern Time.
