= Terrence Edwards Jr. =

American basketball player (born 2002)

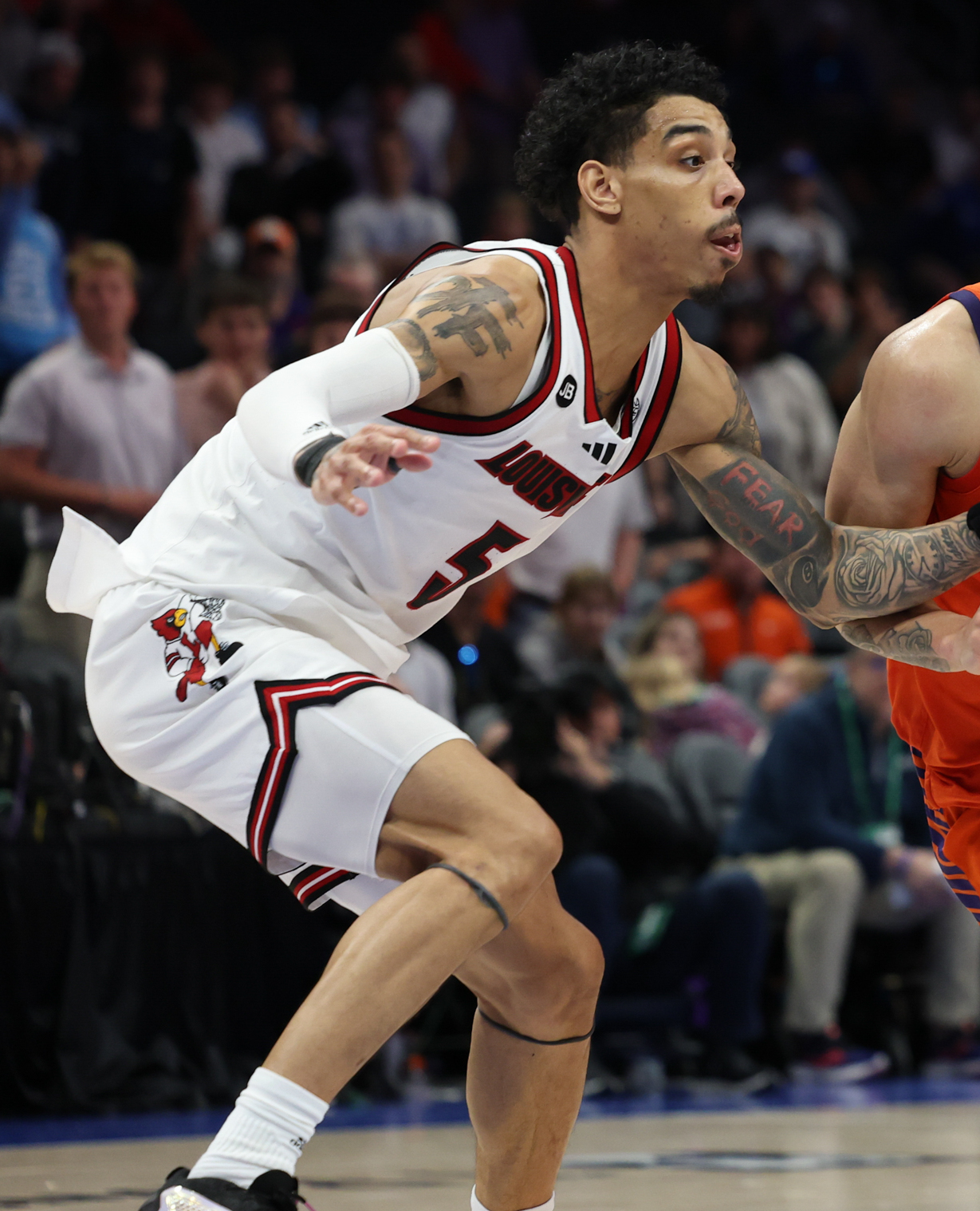

No. 5 – Science City Jena
- Position: Shooting guard / small forward
- League: Basketball Bundesliga

Personal information
- Born: May 20, 2002 (age 24) Atlanta, Georgia, U.S.
- Listed height: 6 ft 6 in (1.98 m)
- Listed weight: 200 lb (91 kg)

Career information
- High school: Tucker (Tucker, Georgia)
- College: James Madison (2020–2024); Louisville (2024–2025)
- NBA draft: 2025: undrafted
- Playing career: 2025–present

Career history
- 2025–2026: Avtodor Saratov
- 2026–present: Science City Jena

Career highlights
- Third-team All-ACC (2025); Sun Belt Player of the Year (2024); First-team All-Sun Belt (2024); Second-team All-Sun Belt (2023); Sun Belt Sixth Man of the Year (2023)

Terrence Edwards Jr. (born May 20, 2002) is an American professional basketball player for Science City Jena of the German Basketball Bundesliga (BBL). He previously played college basketball for the James Madison Dukes and Louisville Cardinals.

== High school career ==
Edwards attended Tucker High School in Tucker, Georgia. He committed to play college basketball at James Madison University over interest from Drexel, Hofstra, and Georgia Southern.

== College career ==
In his junior year, Edwards averaged 13.3 points and 5.1 rebounds per game, being named the Sun Belt Sixth Man of the Year and earning a spot on the second-team All-Sun Belt. Against No. 4 Michigan State the following season, Edwards tallied 24 points, five rebounds, and three assists in an upset victory. As a result, he was named the Associated Press national player of the week. In a game against Morgan State, Edwards scored 29 points, helping lead James Madison to an 89–75 win and surpassing 1,000 career collegiate points.

At the close of the regular season, Edwards was named the Sun Belt Player of the Year and first-team all-conference.

On April 3, 2024, Edwards announced his decision to transfer to the University of Louisville to play for the Louisville Cardinals.

Edwards went undrafted in the 2025 NBA draft. He participated in the 2025 NBA Summer League for the Milwaukee Bucks. However, he would only play one game during his time there on July 18, 2025 against the Miami Heat's Summer League team. In that game, Edwards played for over 8 minutes and recorded 7 points and 4 rebounds.

== Professional career ==
On August 27, 2025, Terrence signed his first professional contract with Avtodor Saratov of the VTB United League. Together with the Avtodor club, he became the bronze medalist of the Hayretdinov Cup, the bronze medalist of the Ural Great 30th Anniversary Cup and became the winner of the Vladimir Yevstafyevich Rodionov memorial tournament in 2025.

For Avtodor, Edwards played in 13 games (the club having a record of 2 - 11 from those 13 games) and averaged 16.3 points, 5.4 rebounds and 2.1 assists in 33.6 minutes.

In December 2025, Edwards left Avtodor without permission. The club bought him tickets to the USA so that he could personally move his family to Saratov, but he refused to come back.

On July 13, 2026, Edwards signed with Science City Jena of the German Basketball Bundesliga.

== Career statistics ==
Legend
GP	Games played	GS	Games started	MPG	Minutes per game
FG%	Field goal percentage	3P%	3-point field goal percentage	FT%	Free throw percentage
RPG	Rebounds per game	APG	Assists per game	SPG	Steals per game
BPG	Blocks per game	PPG	Points per game	**Bold**	Career high

=== College ===
Year	Team	GP	GS	MPG	FG%	3P%	FT%	RPG	APG	SPG	BPG	PPG
2020–21	James Madison	20	7	17.2	.400	.333	.476	4.2	1.5	.5	.2	5.3
2021–22	James Madison	29	13	20.9	.474	.294	.639	4.2	2.2	1.0	.3	9.1
2022–23	James Madison	32	15	23.6	.529	.458	.719	5.1	1.9	1.2	.2	13.3
2023–24	James Madison	36	36	30.3	.427	.343	.810	4.4	3.4	.9	.3	17.2
2024–25	Louisville	35	32	32.7	.437	.330	.779	4.1	2.7	.7	.2	16.7
