= Sherman Dillard =

American basketball player and coach (born 1955)

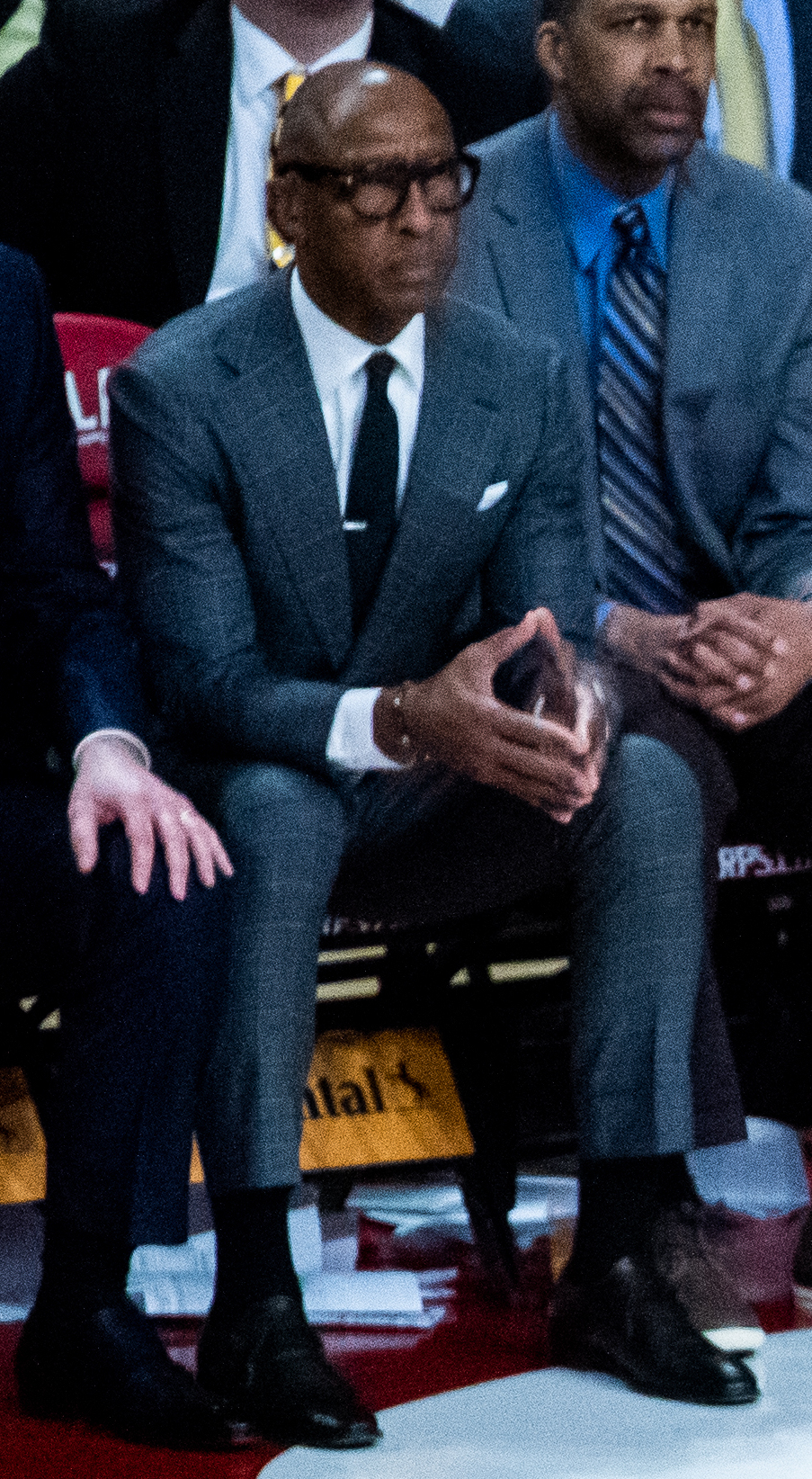
- Dillard on the Iowa sideline in a game at Williams Arena on February 16, 2020.

Biographical details
- Born: September 1, 1955 (age 71); Bassett, Virginia, U.S.

Playing career
- 1973–1978: James Madison
- Position: Guard

Coaching career (HC unless noted)
- 1980–1985: Maryland (assistant)
- 1985–1988: California (assistant)
- 1988–1994: Georgia Tech (assistant)
- 1994–1997: Indiana State
- 1997–2004: James Madison
- 2010–2025: Iowa (assistant)

Head coaching record
- Overall: 122–157

Accomplishments and honors

Championships
- CAA regular season (2000)

Awards
- CAA Coach of the Year (2000)

Sherman Dillard (born September 1, 1955) is an American former basketball player and current coach. He was a head men's basketball coach at Indiana State University and at James Madison as well as an assistant at Maryland, California and Georgia Tech. He was an assistant basketball coach at the University of Iowa from 2010 to 2025 under head coach Fran McCaffery. Prior to being hired at Iowa in May 2010, he was a basketball representative for Nike.

Dillard was the sixth round pick in the 1978 NBA draft by the Indiana Pacers.

He resigned his position at Indiana State in order to replace Lefty Driesell at his alma mater, James Madison University. He had previously worked as an assistant coach for Lefty at the University of Maryland in the early 1980s.

== Head coaching record ==
Record table
Season	Team	Overall	Conference	Standing	Postseason
Indiana State Sycamores (Missouri Valley Conference) (1994–1997)
1994–95	Indiana State	7–19	3–15	10th	
1995–96	Indiana State	10–16	6–12	9th	
1996–97	Indiana State	12–16	6–12	T–8th	
Indiana State:		29–51 (.363)	15–39 (.278)		
James Madison Dukes (Colonial Athletic Association) (1997–2004)
1997–98	James Madison	11–16	6–10	T–5th	
1998–99	James Madison	16–11	9–7	T–4th	
1999–00	James Madison	20–9	12–4	T–1st	
2000–01	James Madison	12–17	6–10	T–7th	
2001–02	James Madison	14–15	6–12	9th	
2002–03	James Madison	13–17	8–10	7th	
2003–04	James Madison	7–21	3–15	10th	
James Madison:		93–106 (.467)	56–68 (.452)		
Total:		122–157 (.437)			
National champion Postseason invitational champion Conference regular season champion Conference regular season and conference tournament champion Division regular season champion Division regular season and conference tournament champion Conference tournament champion
