= Travis Fields Jr. =

American basketball player

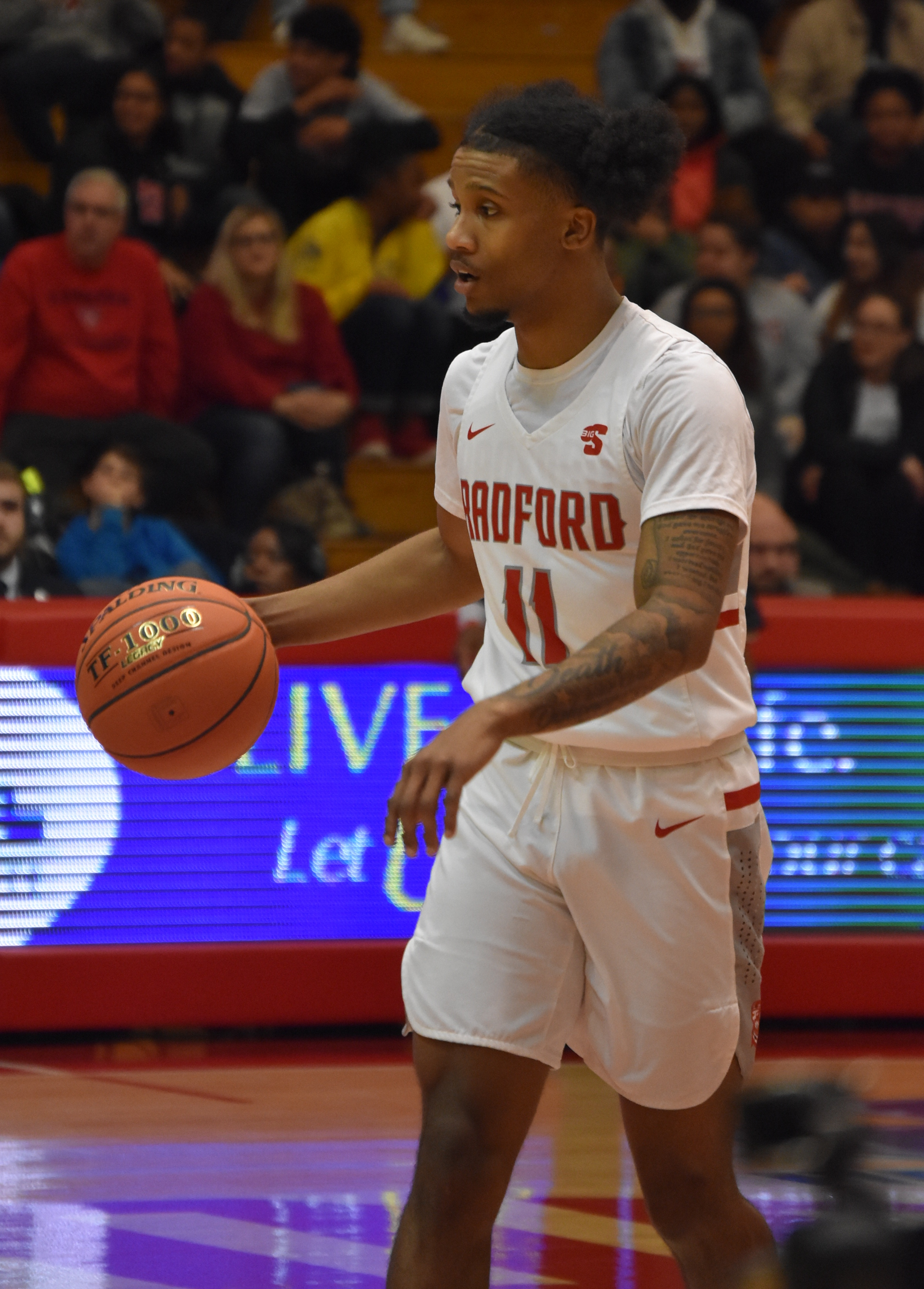

Free agent
- Position: Point guard

Personal information
- Born: November 2, 1997 (age 29)
- Listed height: 5 ft 10 in (1.78 m)
- Listed weight: 185 lb (84 kg)

Career information
- High school: I. C. Norcom (Portsmouth, Virginia)
- College: Old Dominion (2016–2017); Radford (2017–2020)
- NBA draft: 2020: undrafted
- Playing career: 2020–present

Career history
- 2020–2021: BC Vera

Career highlights
- First-team All-Big South (2020); Second-team All-Big South (2019)

Travis Donte Fields Jr. (born November 2, 1997) is an American professional basketball player who last played for BC Vera of the Georgian Superliga. He played college basketball for Old Dominion and Radford.

== High school career ==
Fields attended I. C. Norcom High School, which he led to three consecutive state titles. As a senior, he averaged 17.7 points, 5.5 assists and 2.6 steals per game. Fields scored 30 points in the overtime win against Hopewell High School in the Group 3A state title game. He was named All-Tidewater Boys Basketball Player of the Year. Fields signed with Old Dominion as a preferred walk-on, with the opportunity to earn a scholarship after his freshman season.

== College career ==
Fields averaged 1.0 point per game as a freshman at Old Dominion. Following the season, he opted to transfer to Radford. Because he was a walk-on at Old Dominion, Fields was eligible to play immediately at Radford. He averaged 6.3 points per game as a sophomore as the first guard off the bench and scored 13 points in the NCAA Tournament First Four win over LIU Brooklyn. On February 7, 2019, Fields scored a career-high 33 points and had seven rebounds and five assists in a 101–98 overtime win against Hampton. As a junior, Fields averaged 10.8 points, 3.0 assists, 2.2 rebounds, and 1.5 steals per game. He was named to the Second Team All-Big South. Fields averaged 13.1 points, 2.5 rebounds, and 3.4 assists per game as a senior, shooting 41.6 percent from three-point range. He earned First Team All-Big South honors.

== Professional career ==
On August 13, 2020, Fields signed his first professional contract with BC Vera of the Georgian Superliga.
