= Lou Campanelli =

American basketball coach (1938–2023)

Biographical details
- Born: Elizabeth, New Jersey, US

Coaching career (HC unless noted)

Basketball
- 1972–1985: James Madison Dukes
- 1985–1993: California Golden Bears

Louis P. Campanelli (August 10, 1938 – January 31, 2023) was an American basketball coach. He served as head coach at James Madison University from 1972 to 1985 and the University of California, Berkeley from 1986 to 1993.

== Early life ==
Campanelli was born on August 10, 1938, in Elizabeth, New Jersey. He graduated from Montclair State University.

== Coaching career ==
=== James Madison ===
Campanelli was head coach at James Madison for 13 years (1972–85) where he guided the Dukes to a record of 238–118 and five NCAA Tournament appearances. His 21-year head coaching record stands at 361–226 (.615).

=== California ===
Campanelli played a significant role in Pac-10 men's basketball, having served as head basketball coach at California for eight years, from 1985 to 1993. He compiled a record of 123–108 (.532) and led the Bears to post-season play on four occasions. In his first season, he led Cal to the 1986 National Invitation Tournament, the school's first postseason bid of any kind since the Bears won the national championship in 1960. In 1990, he led the Bears to their first NCAA Tournament in 30 years.

Campanelli was abruptly fired on February 8, 1993 with ten games to go in the 1992–93 season. Athletic director Bob Bockrath inadvertently heard Campanelli give profanity-laced lectures to his players following losses to Arizona State and Arizona. Several players, including freshman Jason Kidd, had complained to Bockrath about his abrasive coaching style, but Bockrath said he had no idea how "beaten down" the players had been until then.

=== Later career ===
After college coaching, Campanelli also coached one year in the Japan Pro League, spent several years as an advance scout for the National Basketball Association's Cleveland Cavaliers and New Jersey Nets, and served as Commissioner of Pac 10 Officiating.

Campenelli coached the junior varsity basketball team at Campolindo High School in Moraga, California, starting as a volunteer assistant.

== Personal life and death ==
Campanelli grew up in Springfield, New Jersey. He graduated from Montclair State University, where he also earned his master's degree. He resided in Livermore, California.

Campanelli died on January 31, 2023, at the age of 84.

== Book ==
In 2015, Campanelli wrote a book titled Dare to Dream: How James Madison University Became Coed and Shocked the Basketball World, about his dream of becoming a college basketball coach and his accomplishment of growing the all-girl Madison college athletics program into a successful men's NCAA basketball team.

== Head coaching record ==
Record table
Season	Team	Overall	Conference	Standing	Postseason
James Madison Dukes (Virginia College Athletic Association) (1972–1975)
1972–73	James Madison	16–10			
1973–74	James Madison	20–6			NCAA Division II first round
1974–75	James Madison	19–6			
James Madison Dukes () (1975–1977)
1975–76	James Madison	18–9			NCAA Division II first round
1976–77	James Madison	17–9			
James Madison Dukes (Eastern College Athletic Conference) (1977–1979)
1977–78	James Madison	18–8	6–2		
1978–79	James Madison	18–8	9–5		
James Madison Dukes (ECAC South) (1979–1985)
1979–80	James Madison	18–8	7–3		
1980–81	James Madison	21–9	11–2	1st	NCAA Division I second round
1981–82	James Madison	24–6	10–1	1st	NCAA Division I second round
1982–83	James Madison	20–11	6–3	2nd	NCAA Division I second round
1983–84	James Madison	15–14	5–5	T–4th	
1984–85	James Madison	14–14	7–7	5th	
James Madison:		238–118 (.669)			
California Golden Bears (Pacific-10 Conference) (1985–1993)
1985–86	California	19–10	11–7	3rd	NIT first round
1986–87	California	20–15	10–8	T–3rd	NIT quarterfinal
1987–88	California	9–20	5–13	T–8th	
1988–89	California	20–13	10–8	5th	NIT second round
1989–90	California	22–10	12–6	3rd	NCAA Division I second round
1990–91	California	13–15	8–10	T–5th	
1991–92	California	10–18	4–14	9th	
1992–93	California*	10–7*	4–5*		
California:		123–108 (.532)	64–71 (.474)		
Total:		361–226 (.615)			
National champion Postseason invitational champion Conference regular season champion Conference regular season and conference tournament champion Division regular season champion Division regular season and conference tournament champion Conference tournament champion

*Campanelli was fired in February 1993; California credits the first 17 games of the regular season to Campanelli.
