= Williamsburg Christian Academy =

Christian school in Virginia, US

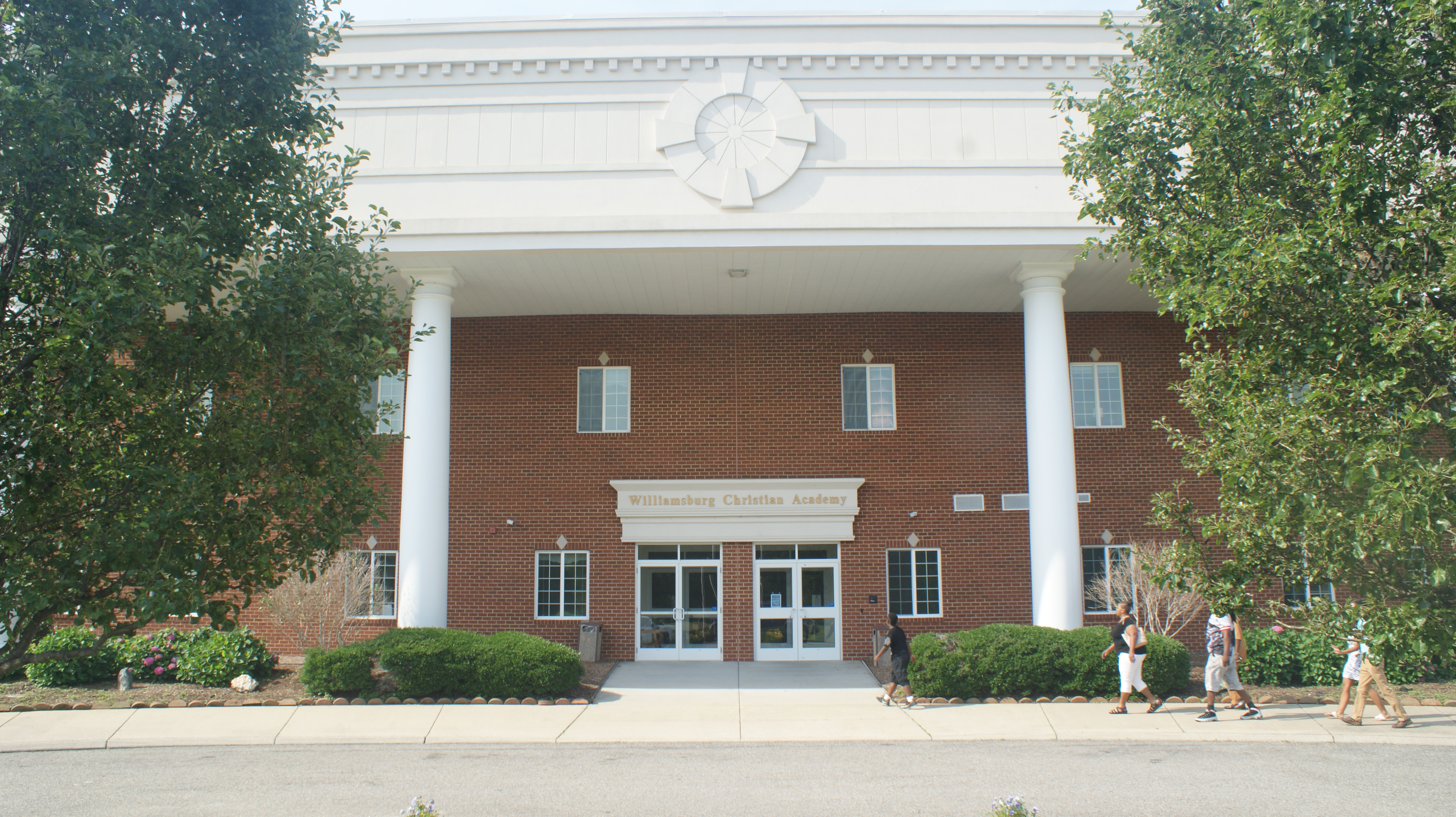

Location
- 101 School House Lane; Williamsburg, Virginia 23188; United States; 37°23′45.8″N 76°47′24.3″W

Information
- School type: Private
- Established: 1978
- CEEB code: 472418
- Head of school: Mr. Johnny Graham
- Teaching staff: 27.6 (as of 2019)
- Grades: K-12
- Enrollment: 200 (2021)
- Student to teacher ratio: 7.1 (2019)
- Classrooms: 50
- Colors: Royal Blue, Gold and White
- Athletics conference: Virginia Metropolitan Athletic Conference
- Mascot: Eagle
- Accreditation: Association of Christian Schools International; AdvancED
- Website: Williamsburg Christian Academy

Williamsburg Christian Academy (WCA) is a private, non-denominational boarding and day International Baccalaureate Christian school located in Williamsburg, Virginia, USA. Established in 1978, the school serves students from kindergarten through 12th grade. It is accredited by AdvancED and by the Association of Christian Schools International.

== History ==
=== Early years ===
In the fall of 1978, Williamsburg Christian Academy enrolled 30 students in kindergarten through third grade. It met at 114-A Palace Lane in Williamsburg, in the Sunday School wing of the Greensprings Chapel. An early ad for WCA mentioned its non-denominational Christian status, as well as the use of the Abeka curriculum, which has been noted for its use of Christian Nationalism and racism, which even goes so far as to refer to slavery as "black immigration. Other extreme Christian Nationalist rhetoric goes so far as to describe slavery as "black immigration".

By 1980 the school had 58 kindergarten through fifth-grade students, with six minority students. Tuition was $700 for kindergarten and $900 for elementary grades, and an additional $65 for books and registration. In 1980 WCA also proposed to lease the Waller Mill School property, but the county refused. It moved to an office building on Jamestown Road. In 1981, the school had 130 students and nine teachers.

By 1982 enrollment had increased to 147 students in kindergarten through seventh grade. WCA's first principal Steve Lentz credited the low student-teacher ratio and WCA's curricular emphasis on Christian fundamentals for the rapidly increasing enrollment.

In 1984, for the first time, upper grades gained instructional time on five new computer terminals. There were 150 students, from 4-year-old kindergarten through ninth grade.

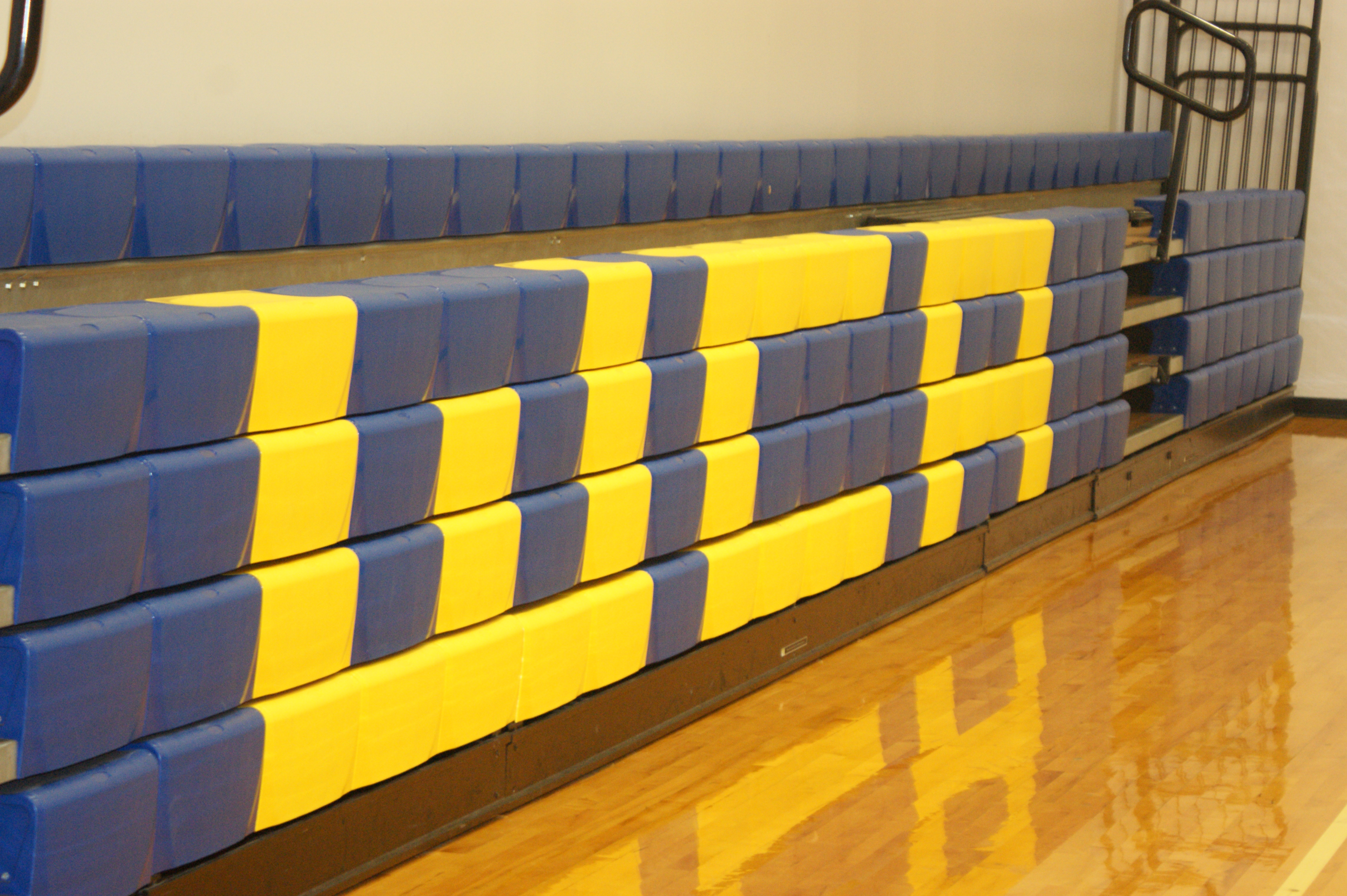
WCA Gymnasium

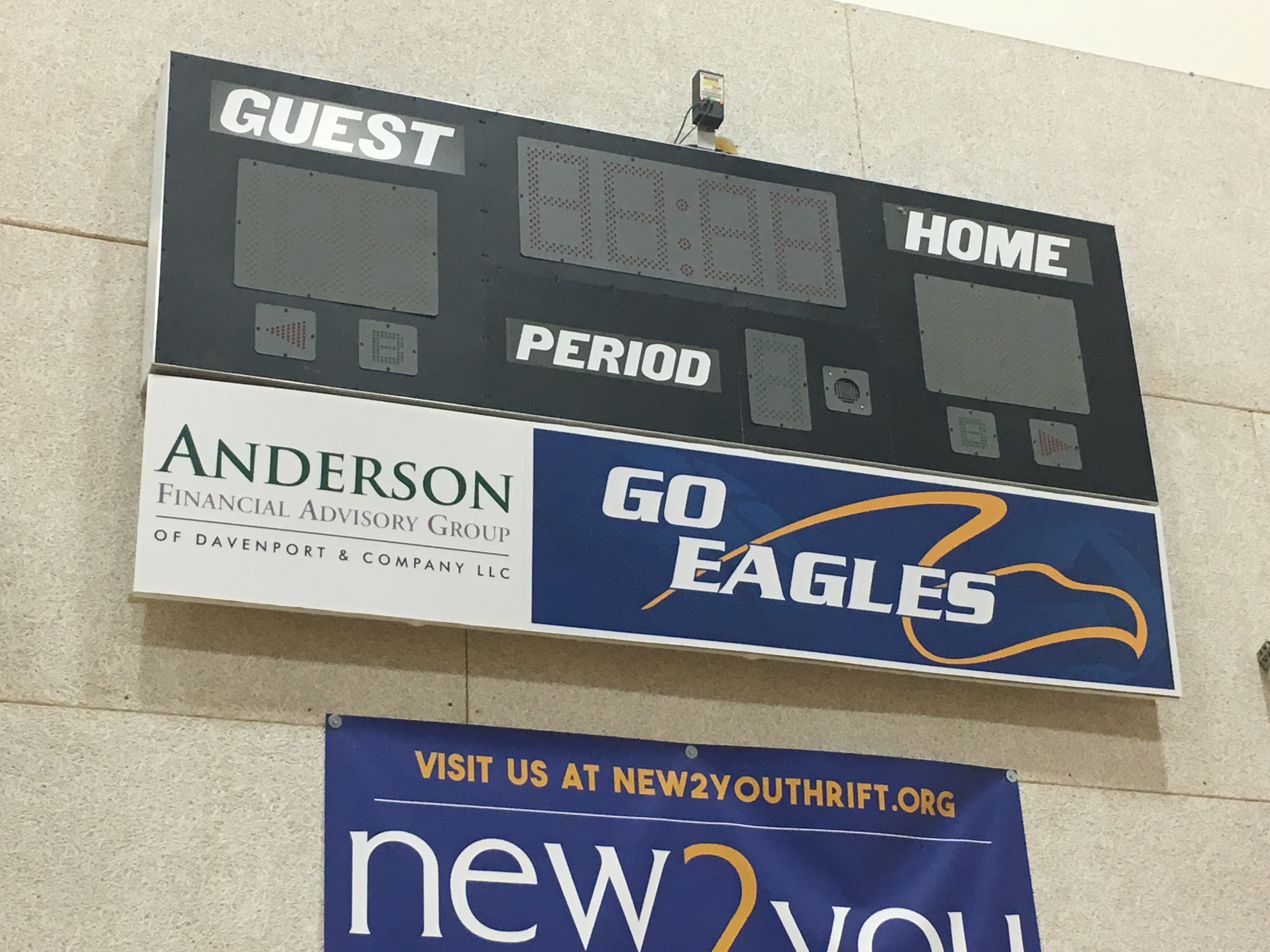
WCA scoreboard

In January 1985, the local newspaper reported on the upcoming addition of varsity sports:

Next fall, the Eagles will be the new kids on the sports block, casting an eye upward at Lafayette, Bruton and Walsingham Academy. The school has 180 students from the pre-school level to 10th grade. Next year, when it adds an 11th grade, varsity athletics will also be added. Right now, Williamsburg Christian competes in the Peninsula Independent Athletic League. The sixth- through eighth-grade program includes soccer and cross country in the fall, volleyball and basketball in the winter and boys' and girls' softball in the spring. Also, the school fields junior varsity high school teams in girls' basketball and soccer in the fall, and basketball in the winter.

— Alan Hirsch, Daily Press (Newport News, Virginia)

By the 1985 school year, advertising for WCA mentioned it was "a Ministry of the Williamsburg New Testament Church". In 1986, WCA was making plans for "a two-phase project to replace its leased facility with a larger, school-owned building" with a projected $2.2 million cost. Construction began with groundbreaking in August 1986, with the new building to "provide a full gymnasium, expanded classrooms and offices, laboratory, business, home economics and computer labs, and day-care facilities".

The 1986–87 school year saw the first graduating class of six seniors, with total enrollment of 190 students. Principal Jim Beavers said, "Parents have a desire for things not found in other schooling, both public and private. They have a desire for education in an environment that's like home. They want the moral values and principles that they teach at home to be taught in school also. Consistency avoids conflict."

WCA held an open house at the end of August 1987 to welcome students to new facilities in a refurbished warehouse on Jamestown Road, and added modular buildings. New curriculum included "special music and art classes for the elementary grades, two choirs, a PIAL sports program for grades six through eight, and an in-school tutoring service". However, by the beginning of the next school year, WCA had relocated to the Williamsburg New Testament Church building on Waller Mill Road, "a much larger and more complete facility". There were approximately 200 pupils in preschool through grade 12.

=== Since 2000 ===
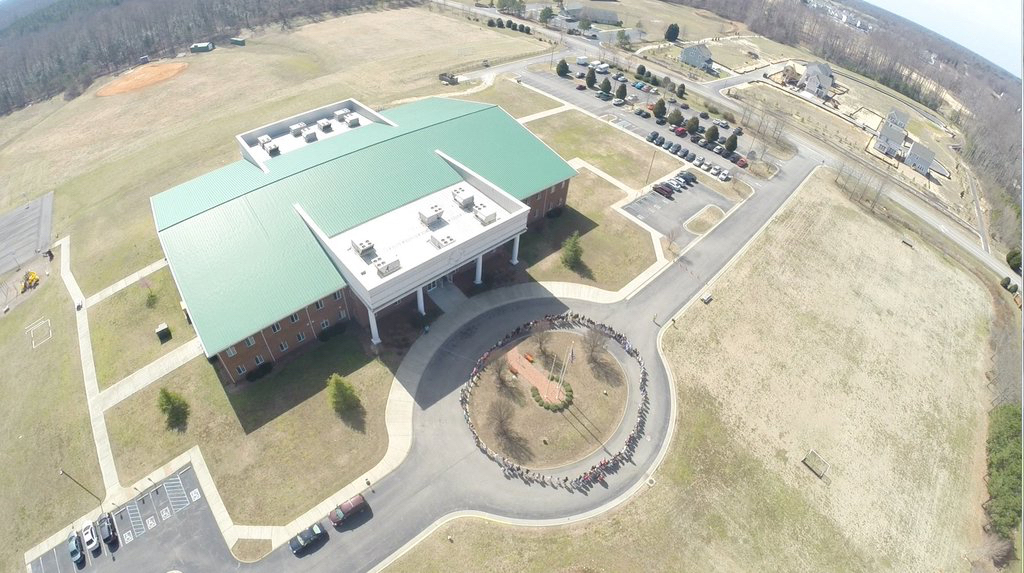
Aerial view of WCA campus

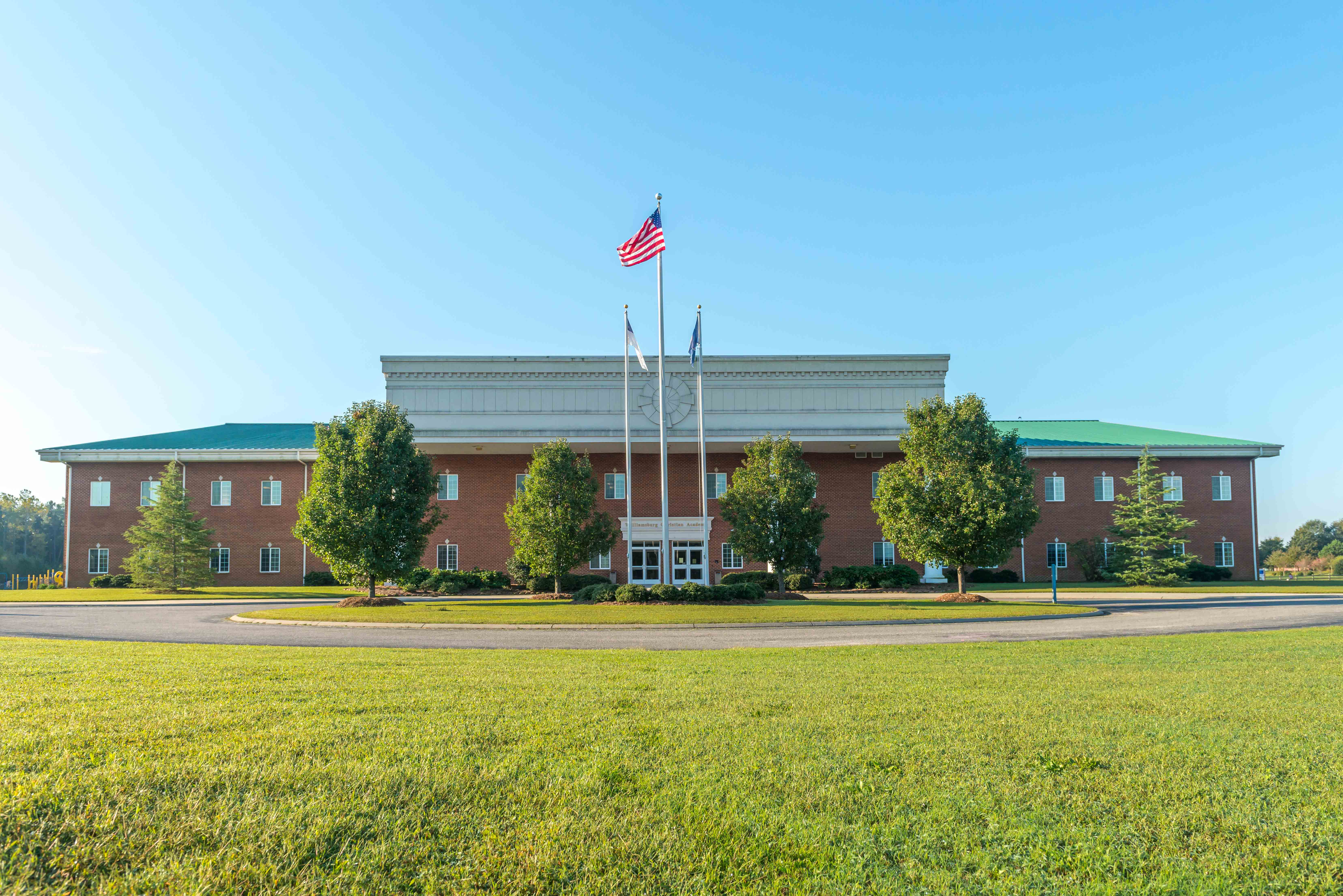
WCA facility

When WCA's enrollment of 280 students filled the Waller Mill Road buildings ("a main building of about 28,000 square feet and four trailers") to capacity, plans for a new building began in 1999. Officials said the new building would "accommodate up to 550 students pre-kindergarten through high school and will include a gymnasium, athletic fields and 28 classrooms".

Opened in 2004, the campus consists of a 56-acre educational complex.

In the 2010s, WCA's Eagles athletics programs have gained local prominence. WCA participates in athletics as members of the Virginia Independent Schools Athletic Association (VISAA). The school has become known for its basketball team, which since 2012 has won two VISAA Division III State Championships in 2012 and 2017, and been the state runner up in 2018. The school also has experienced success with its swim program that it established in 2015, claiming the State Championship Runner up title in VISAA Division II Swimming and Diving in 2019.

In 2021, WCA had an enrollment of 200, and 8 students graduated in the Class of 2021.

== Curriculum ==
The school is in the approval process for the IB Primary Years Program (PYP) and a general music program is available to all Lower School students.

Williamsburg Christian Academy's upper school follows a college-preparatory curriculum, including honors and International Baccalaureate classes, and is certified for the Diploma Program and Middle Years Program.
