= Godwin Hall =

Arena in Harrisonburg, Virginia

- Interactive map of Godwin Hall
- Full name: Godwin Hall
- Location: Harrisonburg, Virginia
- Coordinates: 38.435321°N 78.871450°W
- Owner: James Madison University
- Operator: James Madison University
- Capacity: 5,000

Construction
- Opened: 1972

Tenant
- James Madison Dukes men's basketball (1972–1982)

Godwin Hall is a building on the campus of James Madison University in Harrisonburg, Virginia, housing the School of Kinesiology, the School of Theatre and Dance, and the JMU Athletics department. It is named after Virginia governor Mills E. Godwin, and his wife and JMU alumna Katherine Godwin.

The building is home to Sinclair Gymnasium, a 5,000 seat multi-purpose arena, named for Caroline Sinclair, who was the head of the physical education department at the time. It was home to the James Madison Dukes basketball team until the James Madison University Convocation Center opened in 1982. The building also houses Savage Natatorium, an Olympic-size swimming pool, with seats for 800 spectators. The facility was named for Dorothy Savage, a former physical education instructor.
