= Paul Webb (basketball) =

American basketball coach (1929–2023)

Biographical details
- Born: June 29, 1929
- Died: December 8, 2023 (aged 94); Virginia Beach, Virginia, U.S.

Playing career
- 1947–1951: William & Mary

Coaching career (HC unless noted)
- 1956–1975: Randolph–Macon
- 1975–1985: Old Dominion

Head coaching record
- Overall: 511–257

Accomplishments and honors

Championships
- 2× ECAC South tournament (1980, 1982)

Paul Webb (June 29, 1929 – December 8, 2023) was an American college basketball coach. He was the head coach at Randolph–Macon College from 1956 to 1975 and at Old Dominion University from 1975 to 1985.

Webb played basketball and baseball for the College of William & Mary from 1947 to 1951.

Webb died at his Virginia Beach home on December 8, 2023, at the age of 94.
