= 2017–18 Prairie View A&M Panthers basketball team =

American college basketball season

2017–18 Prairie View A&M Panthers basketball
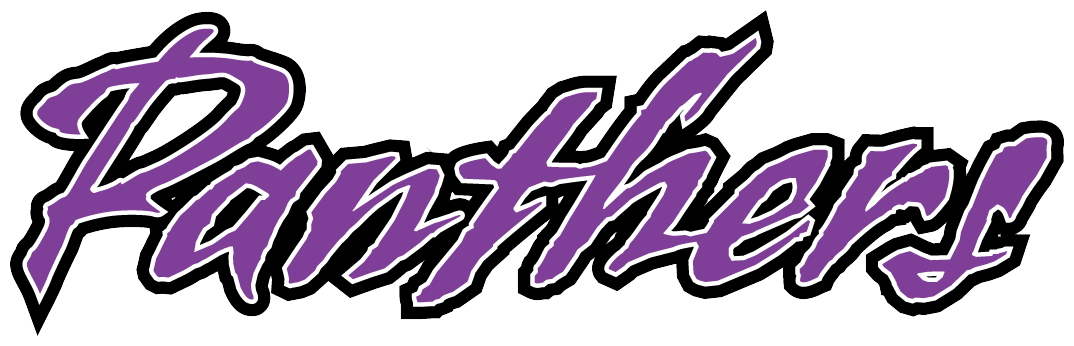

MGM Resorts Main Event Middleweight champions
- Conference: Southwestern Athletic Conference
- Record: 16–18 (12–6 SWAC)
- Head coach: Byron Smith (2nd season)
- Assistant coaches: Keenan Curry; Landon Bussie; Derrick Daniels
- Home arena: William Nicks Building

2017–18 SWAC men's basketball standings
	Conf.				Overall
Team	W		L	PCT	W		L	PCT
Grambling State*	13	–	5	.722	17	–	14	.548
Prairie View A&M	12	–	6	.667	16	–	18	.471
Texas Southern †	12	–	6	.667	16	–	20	.444
Arkansas–Pine Bluff	12	–	6	.667	14	–	21	.400
Southern	10	–	8	.556	15	–	18	.455
Jackson State	9	–	9	.500	12	–	20	.375
Alabama State	8	–	10	.444	8	–	23	.258
Alcorn State	7	–	11	.389	11	–	21	.344
Mississippi Valley State	4	–	14	.222	4	–	28	.125
Alabama A&M*	3	–	15	.167	3	–	28	.097
† 2018 SWAC tournament winner *ineligible for postseason due to APR violations

The 2017–18 Prairie View A&M Panthers basketball team represented Prairie View A&M University during the 2017–18 NCAA Division I men's basketball season. The Panthers, led by second-year head coach Byron Smith, played their home games at the William Nicks Building in Prairie View, Texas as members of the Southwestern Athletic Conference. They finished the season 16–18, 12–6 in SWAC play to finish in a three-way tie for second place. Due to Grambling State's Academic Progress Rate violations and subsequent postseason ineligibility, the Panthers received the No. 2 seed in the SWAC tournament. They defeated Alcorn State in the quarterfinals before losing to Texas Southern in the semifinals.

== Previous season ==
The Panthers finished the 2016–17 season 13–20, 10–8 in SWAC play to finish in a four-way tie for third place. As the No. 4 seed in the SWAC tournament, they lost to Grambling State in the quarterfinals.

== Roster ==
2017–18 Prairie View A&M Panthers men's basketball team
Players
Coaches

Pos.	#	Name	Height	Weight	Year	Hometown
G	0	Troy Thompson	6 ft 4 in (1.93 m)	190 lb (86 kg)	Sr	Oakland, California
F	1	Keion Alexander	6 ft 9 in (2.06 m)	190 lb (86 kg)	Sr	Brooklyn, New York
G	3	Gary Blackston	6 ft 2 in (1.88 m)	185 lb (84 kg)	Jr	Baltimore, Maryland
G	4	Juan Hood	5 ft 9 in (1.75 m)	189 lb (86 kg)	Fr	Magnolia, Texas
G	11	Dennis Jones	6 ft 1 in (1.85 m)	170 lb (77 kg)	RS Jr	Fort Worth, Texas
C	12	JD Wallace	6 ft 9 in (2.06 m)	205 lb (93 kg)		Dallas, Texas
F	14	Zachary Hamilton	6 ft 4 in (1.93 m)	200 lb (91 kg)	Sr	Houston, Texas
F	21	Shay'rone Jett	6 ft 8 in (2.03 m)	190 lb (86 kg)	Sr	Hartsville, South Carolina
G	22	Shaquille Preston	6 ft 4 in (1.93 m)	185 lb (84 kg)	Sr	New Orleans, Louisiana
F	24	Jordan Lumpkins	6 ft 4 in (1.93 m)	215 lb (98 kg)	RS Sr	New Orleans, Louisiana
G	30	Austin Starr	6 ft 3 in (1.91 m)	185 lb (84 kg)	Jr	Las Vegas, Nevada
G	32	Xavier Eaglin	6 ft 7 in (2.01 m)	205 lb (93 kg)	So	Raywood, Texas

Head coach

- Byron Smith

Assistant coach(es)

- Landon Bussie
- Derrick Daniels
- Wendell Moore

Legend

- (C) Team captain
- (S) Suspended
- (I) Ineligible
- (W) Walk-on
- Injured
- Current redshirt

Roster
Last update: January 24, 2018

== Schedule and results ==
Date time, TV	Rank^{#}	Opponent^{#}	Result	Record	Site (attendance) city, state
Non-conference regular season
Nov. 10, 2017*; 8:00 pm, P12N		at Utah; MGM Resorts Main Event campus-site game	L 62–83	0–1	Jon M. Huntsman Center (9,887); Salt Lake City, UT
Nov. 13, 2017*; 6:00 pm, P12N		at Oregon	L 67–100	0–2	Matthew Knight Arena (6,428); Eugene, OR
Nov. 15, 2017*; 7:00 pm		at UNLV; MGM Resorts Main Event campus-site game	L 63–98	0–3	Thomas & Mack Center (8,078); Paradise, NV
Nov. 20, 2017*; 11:00 am		vs. Eastern Kentucky; MGM Resorts Main Event middleweight semifinals	W 80–70	1–3	T-Mobile Arena; Paradise, NV
Nov. 22, 2017*; 11:00 am		vs. Georgia State; MGM Resorts Main Event middleweight finals	W 71–56	2–3	T-Mobile Arena; Paradise, NV
Nov. 24, 2017*; 7:00 pm		at UC Santa Barbara	L 66–69	2–4	The Thunderdome (1,012); Santa Barbara, CA
Dec. 3, 2017*; 4:00 pm		at New Mexico State	L 57–69	2–5	Pan American Center (3,591); Las Cruces, NM
Dec. 6, 2017*; 6:59 pm		at Hawaii	L 60–72	2–6	Stan Sheriff Center (4,963); Honolulu, HI
Dec. 9, 2017*; 3:30 pm, SECN		at No. 7 Texas A&M	L 53–73	2–7	Reed Arena (7,804); College Station, TX
Dec. 14, 2017*; 7:00 pm, ESPN3		at Tulsa	L 73–77	2–8	Reynolds Center (3,315); Tulsa, OK
Dec. 17, 2017*; 3:00 pm		at Houston	L 72–92	2–9	H&PE Arena (2,788); Houston, TX
Dec. 20, 2017*; 7:00 pm		at Ohio	L 65–84	2–10	Convocation Center (5,193); Athens, OH
Dec. 22, 2017*; 7:00 pm, ATTSNRM		at New Mexico	L 78–87	2–11	The Pit (9,423); Albuquerque, NM
Dec. 29, 2017*; 3:00 pm		Jarvis Christian	W 110–80	3–11	William J. Nicks Building; Prairie View, TX
SWAC regular season
Jan. 1, 2018; 5:00 pm		Alcorn State	W 76–64	4–11 (1–0)	William J. Nicks Building (231); Prairie View, TX
Jan. 3, 2018; 7:30 pm		Southern	W 78–74	5–11 (2–0)	William J. Nicks Building (323); Prairie View, TX
Jan. 6, 2018; 7:30 pm		at Texas Southern	L 94–100	5–12 (2–1)	H&PE Arena (5,128); Houston, TX
Jan. 13, 2018; 5:30 pm		at Grambling State	L 71–80	5–13 (2–2)	Fredrick C. Hobdy Assembly Center (715); Grambling, LA
Jan. 15, 2018; 7:30 pm		at Jackson State	L 71–79	5–14 (2–3)	Williams Assembly Center (1,539); Jackson, MS
Jan 20, 2018; 5:00 pm		Arkansas–Pine Bluff	L 66–72	5–15 (2–4)	William J. Nicks Building (1,112); Prairie View, TX
Jan 22, 2018; 7:30 pm		Mississippi Valley State	W 93–77	1,304 (6–15)	William J. Nicks Building (3–4); Prairie View, TX
Jan 27, 2018; 5:00 pm		at Alabama State	W 86–80	7–15 (4–4)	Dunn–Oliver Acadome; Montgomery, AL
Jan 29, 2018; 7:30 pm		at Alabama A&M	W 88–67	8–15 (5–4)	Elmore Gymnasium (423); Normal, AL
Feb 3, 2018; 5:00 pm		Texas Southern	W 96–82	9–15 (6–4)	William J. Nicks Building (3,351); Prairie View, TX
Feb 10, 2018; 5:00 pm		Grambling State	L 85–90	9–16 (6–5)	William J. Nicks Building (472); Prairie View, TX
Feb 12, 2018; 8:00 pm, ESPNU		Jackson State	W 63–58 ^{OT}	10–16 (7–5)	William J. Nicks Building (2,465); Prairie View, TX
Feb 17, 2018; 7:00 pm		at Arkansas–Pine Bluff	W 76–71 ^{OT}	11–16 (8–5)	K.L. Johnson Complex (2,390); Pine Bluff, AR
Feb 19, 2018; 7:30 pm		at Mississippi Valley State	L 71–76	11–17 (8–6)	Harrison HPER Complex (992); Itta Bena, MS
Feb 24, 2018; 5:00 pm		Alabama State	W 80–74	12–17 (9–6)	William J. Nicks Building (3,240); Prairie View, TX
Feb 26, 2018; 7:30 pm		Alabama A&M	W 71–58	13–17 (10–6)	William J. Nicks Building (1,443); Prairie View, TX
Mar 1, 2018; 7:00 pm		at Alcorn State	W 79–69	14–17 (11–6)	Davey Whitney Complex (251); Lorman, MS
Mar 3, 2018; 5:30 pm		at Southern	W 77–69	15–17 (12–6)	F. G. Clark Center (1,345); Baton Rouge, LA
SWAC tournament
Mar 6, 2018; 8:30 pm	(2)	vs. (7) Alcorn State; Quarterfinals	W 87–71	16–17	William J. Nicks Building (1,252); Prairie View, TX
Mar 6, 2018; 8:30 pm, ESPN3	(2)	vs. (3) Texas Southern; Semifinals	L 74–88	16–18	Delmar Fieldhouse (2,500); Houston, TX
*Non-conference game. ^{#}Rankings from AP Poll. (#) Tournament seedings in parentheses. All times are in Central Time.
