= 2017–18 Southern Jaguars basketball team =

American college basketball season

2017–18 Southern Jaguars basketball
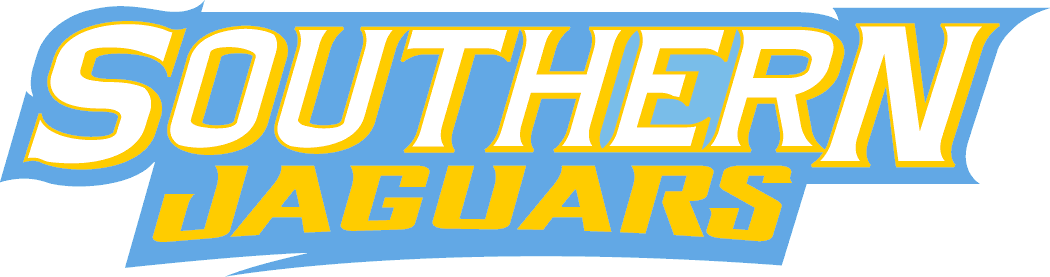
- Conference: Southwestern Athletic Conference
- Record: 15–18 (10–8 SWAC)
- Head coach: Morris Scott (interim) (1st season)
- Assistant coaches: Pedro "Petey" Cipriano; Jethro Hillman; Chrys Cornelius
- Home arena: F. G. Clark Center

2017–18 SWAC men's basketball standings
	Conf.				Overall
Team	W		L	PCT	W		L	PCT
Grambling State*	13	–	5	.722	17	–	14	.548
Prairie View A&M	12	–	6	.667	16	–	18	.471
Texas Southern †	12	–	6	.667	16	–	20	.444
Arkansas–Pine Bluff	12	–	6	.667	14	–	21	.400
Southern	10	–	8	.556	15	–	18	.455
Jackson State	9	–	9	.500	12	–	20	.375
Alabama State	8	–	10	.444	8	–	23	.258
Alcorn State	7	–	11	.389	11	–	21	.344
Mississippi Valley State	4	–	14	.222	4	–	28	.125
Alabama A&M*	3	–	15	.167	3	–	28	.097
† 2018 SWAC tournament winner *ineligible for postseason due to APR violations

The 2017–18 Southern Jaguars basketball team represented Southern University during the 2017–18 NCAA Division I men's basketball season. The Jaguars, led by interim head coach Morris Scott, played their home games at the F. G. Clark Center in Baton Rouge, Louisiana as members of the Southwestern Athletic Conference. They finished the season 15–18, 10–8 in SWAC play to finish in fifth place. Due to Grambling State's Academic Progress Rate violations and subsequent postseason ineligibility, the Jaguars received the No. 4 seed in the SWAC tournament. They defeated Jackson State in the quarterfinals before losing to Arkansas–Pine Bluff in the semifinals.

On April 12, 2018, Southern hired Stetson assistant coach and former Morehead State/Mississippi Valley State head coach Sean Woods for the full-time job.

== Previous season ==
The Jaguars finished the 2016–17 season 15–18, 10–8 in SWAC play to finish in a four-way tie for third place. As the 3-seed in the SWAC tournament they defeated Jackson State before losing in the semifinals to Alcorn State.

On March 31, head coach Roman Banks, who had been serving as Southern's interim Athletic Director for almost two years, was promoted to full-time Athletic Director and stepped down as basketball coach. He finished his coaching career at Southern with a six-year record of 114–85. Assistant coach Morris Scott was named interim head coach.

== Roster ==
2017–18 Southern Jaguars men's basketball team
Players
Coaches

Pos.	#	Name	Height	Weight	Year	Hometown
G	0	Richard Lee	6 ft 4 in (1.93 m)	200 lb (91 kg)	Sr	Fort Lauderdale, Florida
G	1	LaQuentin Collins	6 ft 3 in (1.91 m)	200 lb (91 kg)	Sr	Monroe, Louisiana
F	2	Emanual Shepherd	6 ft 8 in (2.03 m)	200 lb (91 kg)	Sr	Toronto, Ontario, Canada
G	3	Eddie Reese	6 ft 1 in (1.85 m)	160 lb (73 kg)	Jr	Detroit, Michigan
G	4	Chris Thomas	6 ft 4 in (1.93 m)	195 lb (88 kg)	RS Sr	Baton Rouge, Louisiana
G	10	Jamar Sandifer	6 ft 4 in (1.93 m)	205 lb (93 kg)	So	Dallas, Texas
F	12	Jared Sam	6 ft 10 in (2.08 m)	240 lb (109 kg)	Sr	Baton Rouge, Louisiana
G	13	Torrey Mayo	5 ft 8 in (1.73 m)	160 lb (73 kg)	Jr	Deltona, Florida
G	14	Aaron Ray	6 ft 3 in (1.91 m)	190 lb (86 kg)	Jr	Middletown, New York
F	20	Sidney Umude	6 ft 7 in (2.01 m)	205 lb (93 kg)	RS Jr	San Antonio, Texas
F	21	Patrick Smith	6 ft 7 in (2.01 m)	205 lb (93 kg)	RS Sr	Bernice, Louisiana
C	22	Shaquille Benson	6 ft 10 in (2.08 m)	260 lb (118 kg)	Jr	New Orleans, Louisiana
F	24	Mubashar Ali	7 ft 0 in (2.13 m)	230 lb (104 kg)	RS Fr	Helsinki, Finland
G	30	DeRias Johnson	6 ft 3 in (1.91 m)	180 lb (82 kg)	RS Fr	Dallas, Texas

Head coach

- Morris Scott (Northwestern State)

Assistant coach(es)

- Pedro "Petey" Cipriano (Southern)
- Chrys Cornelius (Western Illinois)
- Jethro Hillman (Miami (FL))

Legend

- (C) Team captain
- (S) Suspended
- (I) Ineligible
- (W) Walk-on
- Injured
- Current redshirt

Roster
Last update: January 24, 2018

== Schedule and results ==
Date time, TV	Rank^{#}	Opponent^{#}	Result	Record	Site (attendance) city, state
Non-conference regular season
Nov 10, 2017*; 7:00 pm, BTN+		at Illinois; Global Sports Invitational	L 55–102	0–1	State Farm Center (14,637); Champaign, IL
Nov 13, 2017*; 7:00 pm		at Marshall; Global Sports Invitational	L 74–83	0–2	Cam Henderson Center (4,674); Huntington, WV
Nov 15, 2017*; 5:30 pm, ESPN3		at Missouri State	L 58–86	0–3	JQH Arena (4,876); Springfield, MO
Nov 17, 2017*; 6:00 pm, ACCN		at No. 1 Duke	L 61–78	0–4	Cameron Indoor Stadium (9,314); Durham, NC
Nov 19, 2017*; 3:00 pm		at North Carolina Central; Global Sports Invitational	L 67–80	0–5	McLendon–McDougald Gymnasium (803); Durham, NC
Nov 22, 2017*; 7:00 pm		UT Martin; Global Sports Invitational	W 69–66	1–5	F. G. Clark Center (225); Baton Rouge, LA
Nov 29, 2017*; 6:00 pm		Wiley	W 92–69	2–5	F. G. Clark Center; Baton Rouge, LA
Dec 6, 2017*; 12:00 pm, ESPN3		at Tulane	L 76–95	2–6	Devlin Fieldhouse (1,834); New Orleans, LA
Dec 9, 2017*; 1:00 pm, ESPN3		at UCF	L 60–76	2–7	CFE Arena (4,139); Orlando, FL
Dec 10, 2017*; 4:00 pm, BTN		at Iowa	L 60–91	2–8	Carver-Hawkeye Arena (11,397); Iowa City, IA
Dec 14, 2017*; 6:30 pm		Florida A&M	W 68–50	3–8	F. G. Clark Center (421); Baton Rouge, LA
Dec 20, 2017*; 7:00 pm, FCS		at No. 18 Baylor	L 60–80	3–9	Ferrell Center (5,877); Waco, TX
Dec 29, 2017*; 1:00 pm		Ecclesia	W 98–57	4–9	F. G. Clark Center (45); Baton Rouge, LA
SWAC regular season
Jan 1, 2018; 8:00 pm, ESPNU		at Texas Southern	L 66–78	4–10 (0–1)	H&PE Arena (1,007); Houston, TX
Jan 3, 2018; 7:30 pm		at Prairie View	L 74–78	4–11 (0–2)	William J. Nicks Building (323); Prairie View, TX
Jan 6, 2018; 5:30 pm		Grambling State	W 80–69	5–11 (1–2)	F. G. Clark Center (2,108); Baton Rouge, LA
Jan 8, 2018; 7:30 pm		Jackson State	L 61–65	5–12 (1–3)	F. G. Clark Center (1,129); Baton Rouge, LA
Jan 13, 2018; 7:30 pm		at Arkansas–Pine Bluff	L 76–78 ^{OT}	5–13 (1–4)	K. L. Johnson Complex (2,600); Pine Bluff, AR
Jan 15, 2018; 7:30 pm		at Mississippi Valley State	W 78–70 ^{OT}	6–13 (2–4)	Harrison HPER Complex (2,876); Itta Bena, MS
Jan 20, 2018; 5:30 pm		Alabama State	W 63–61	7–13 (3–4)	F. G. Clark Center (1,299); Baton Rouge, LA
Jan 22, 2018; 7:30 pm		Alabama A&M	W 62–61	8–13 (4–4)	F. G. Clark Center (1,109); Baton Rouge, LA
Jan 27, 2018; 5:30 pm		Alcorn State	W 61–48	9–13 (5–4)	F. G. Clark Center (1,178); Baton Rouge, LA
Feb 3, 2018; 5:30 pm		at Grambling State	L 68–69	9–14 (5–5)	Fredrick C. Hobdy Assembly Center (3,875); Grambling, LA
Feb 5, 2018; 8:00 pm, ESPNU		at Jackson State	W 67–65	10–14 (6–5)	Williams Assembly Center (3,996); Jackson, MS
Feb 10, 2018; 5:30 pm		Arkansas–Pine Bluff	W 70–62	11–14 (7–5)	F. G. Clark Center (1,011); Baton Rouge, LA
Feb 12, 2018; 7:30 pm		Mississippi Valley State	W 55–51	12–14 (8–5)	F. G. Clark Center (1,005); Baton Rouge, LA
Feb 17, 2018; 5:30 pm		at Alabama State	W 71–67	13–14 (9–5)	Dunn–Oliver Acadome; Montgomery, AL
Feb 19, 2018; 7:30 pm		at Alabama A&M	W 60–50	14–14 (10–5)	Elmore Gymnasium (357); Normal, AL
Feb 24, 2018; 5:30 pm		at Alcorn State	L 85–89	14–15 (10–6)	Davey Whitney Complex (472); Lorman, MS
Mar 1, 2018; 7:30 pm		Texas Southern	L 88–90	14–16 (10–7)	F. G. Clark Center (2,351); Baton Rouge, LA
Mar 3, 2018; 5:30 pm		Alcorn State	L 69–77	14–17 (10–8)	F. G. Clark Center (1,345); Baton Rouge, LA
SWAC tournament
Mar 6, 2018; 7:30 pm	(4)	vs. (5) Jackson State; Quarterfinals	W 62–60	15–17	F. G. Clark Center (2,059); Baton Rouge, LA
Mar 9, 2018; 2:30 pm, ESPN3	(4)	vs. (1) Arkansas–Pine Bluff; Semifinals	L 65–71	15–18	Delmar Fieldhouse (1,325); Houston, TX
*Non-conference game. ^{#}Rankings from AP Poll. (#) Tournament seedings in parentheses. All times are in Central Time.
