= 2017–18 Arkansas–Pine Bluff Golden Lions men's basketball team =

American college basketball season

2017–18 Arkansas–Pine Bluff Golden Lions men's basketball
- Conference: Southwestern Athletic Conference
- Record: 14–21 (12–6 SWAC)
- Head coach: George Ivory (10th season)
- Assistant coaches: Kenneth Broyles; Jarvis Gunter; Richard "Dell" Cannon
- Home arena: K. L. Johnson Complex

2017–18 SWAC men's basketball standings
	Conf.				Overall
Team	W		L	PCT	W		L	PCT
Grambling State*	13	–	5	.722	17	–	14	.548
Prairie View A&M	12	–	6	.667	16	–	18	.471
Texas Southern †	12	–	6	.667	16	–	20	.444
Arkansas–Pine Bluff	12	–	6	.667	14	–	21	.400
Southern	10	–	8	.556	15	–	18	.455
Jackson State	9	–	9	.500	12	–	20	.375
Alabama State	8	–	10	.444	8	–	23	.258
Alcorn State	7	–	11	.389	11	–	21	.344
Mississippi Valley State	4	–	14	.222	4	–	28	.125
Alabama A&M*	3	–	15	.167	3	–	28	.097
† 2018 SWAC tournament winner *ineligible for postseason due to APR violations

The 2017–18 Arkansas–Pine Bluff Golden Lions men's basketball team represented the University of Arkansas at Pine Bluff during the 2017–18 NCAA Division I men's basketball season. The Golden Lions, led by 10th-year head coach George Ivory, played their home games at the K. L. Johnson Complex as members of the Southwestern Athletic Conference. They finished the season 14–21, 12–6 in SWAC play to finish in a three-way tie for second place. Due to Grambling State's Academic Progress Rate violations and subsequent postseason ineligibility, the Golden Lions received the No. 1 seed in the SWAC tournament. They defeated Mississippi Valley State and Southern before losing to Texas Southern in the tournament championship.

== Previous season ==
The Golden Lions finished the 2016–17 season 7–25, 6–12 in SWAC play to finish in a tie for eighth place. They did not qualify for the SWAC tournament.

== Roster ==
2017–18 Arkansas–Pine Bluff Golden Lions men's basketball team
Players
Coaches

Pos.	#	Name	Height	Weight	Year	Hometown
F	00	Dwain Whitfield	6 ft 6 in (1.98 m)	205 lb (93 kg)	Jr	Forrest City, Arkansas
G/F	1	Charles Jackson	6 ft 5 in (1.96 m)	210 lb (95 kg)	Jr	Cleveland, Mississippi
G	3	Kennedy McKinney	6 ft 3 in (1.91 m)	170 lb (77 kg)	Sr	Memphis, Tennessee
G	10	Quamauri Hardy	6 ft 3 in (1.91 m)	180 lb (82 kg)	Fr	Hoover, Alabama
F	12	Terrance Banyard	6 ft 8 in (2.03 m)	215 lb (98 kg)	Fr	Milwaukee, Wisconsin
G	13	Joe'Randle Toliver	6 ft 4 in (1.93 m)	180 lb (82 kg)	Sr	Jonesboro, Arkansas
G	14	Marcus Wallace	6 ft 1 in (1.85 m)	180 lb (82 kg)	Jr	Jackson, Mississippi
F	15	Trent Steen	6 ft 8 in (2.03 m)	225 lb (102 kg)	Sr	Forrest City, Arkansas
G	22	Khalid Campbell	6 ft 1 in (1.85 m)	175 lb (79 kg)	So	Greenwood, Mississippi
G	23	Martaveous McKnight	6 ft 4 in (1.93 m)	190 lb (86 kg)	Jr	Walls, Mississippi
G	25	Christian Robertson	6 ft 4 in (1.93 m)	—	Jr	Monticello, Arkansas
G	30	Cameron Posey	6 ft 2 in (1.88 m)	180 lb (82 kg)	Fr	Milwaukee, Wisconsin
F	34	Chris Smith	6 ft 8 in (2.03 m)	225 lb (102 kg)	Jr	Memphis, Tennessee
F	35	Travon Harper	6 ft 8 in (2.03 m)	220 lb (100 kg)	Sr	McNeil, Arkansas
G	40	J'Breun Sprinkle	6 ft 2 in (1.88 m)	175 lb (79 kg)	RS So	White Hall, Arkansas
G	44	William Ridgell	5 ft 9 in (1.75 m)	165 lb (75 kg)	Fr	White Hall, Arkansas
G	50	Jordan McNair	5 ft 8 in (1.73 m)	160 lb (73 kg)	So	Jacksonville, Arkansas
F/C	52	David Tillman	6 ft 10 in (2.08 m)	225 lb (102 kg)	RS Sr	Houston, Texas
G		Anthony Davis Jr.	5 ft 9 in (1.75 m)	165 lb (75 kg)	Fr	Shaw, Mississippi
F		Isiah Solomon	6 ft 5 in (1.96 m)	175 lb (79 kg)	Fr	Pine Bluff, Arkansas

Head coach

- George Ivory (Mississippi Valley State)

Assistant coach(es)

- Kenneth Broyles
- Jarvis Gunter (Arkansas–Pine Bluff)
- Richard Cannon (Mississippi Valley State)

Legend

- (C) Team captain
- (S) Suspended
- (I) Ineligible
- (W) Walk-on
- Injured
- Current redshirt

Roster
Last update: January 27, 2018

== Schedule and results ==
Date time, TV	Rank^{#}	Opponent^{#}	Result	Record	High points	High rebounds	High assists	Site (attendance) city, state
Non-conference regular season
Nov 10, 2017*; 11:00 p.m., Spectrum		at Hawaii; Rainbow Classic	L 70–82	0–1	25 – McKnight	4 – McKnight	3 – McKinney	Stan Sheriff Center (5,764); Honolulu, HI
Nov 12, 2017*; 7:30 p.m., Spectrum		vs. Troy; Rainbow Classic	L 57–81	0–2	16 – Jackson	5 – McDyess	3 – Hardy	Stan Sheriff Center (5,180); Honolulu, HI
Nov 13, 2017*; 8:30 p.m., Spectrum		vs. North Dakota; Rainbow Classic	L 71–80	0–3	30 – McKnight	7 – McKnight	3 – McKnight	Stan Sheriff Center (5,078); Honolulu, HI
Nov 18, 2017*; 7:00 p.m., ESPN3		at SMU	L 37–72	0–4	19 – McKnight	5 – McKnight	2 – Jackson	Moody Coliseum (6,738); University Park, TX
Nov 20, 2017*; 7:00 p.m.		at Air Force; Men Against Breast Cancer Showcase	L 47–57	0–5	15 – McKnight	5 – Steen	3 – McKnight	Clune Arena (1,355); Colorado Springs, CO
Nov 22, 2017*; 9:00 p.m.		vs. Texas State; Men Against Breast Cancer Showcase	L 54–71	0–6	18 – Jackson	5 – Harper	3 – Jackson	Alex G. Spanos Center (30); Stockton, CA
Nov 24, 2017*; 10:00 p.m.		at Pacific; Men Against Breast Cancer Showcase	L 69–78	0–7	20 – McKnight	4 – Steen	3 – Jackson	Alex G. Spanos Center (1,349); Stockton, CA
Nov 25, 2017*; 9:00 p.m.		vs. Canisius; Men Against Breast Cancer Showcase	L 58–81	0–8	18 – McKnight	7 – Harper	3 – McKnight	Alex G. Spanos Center (1,325); Stockton, CA
Dec 2, 2017*; 9:00 p.m.		at Santa Clara	L 57–72	0–9	18 – McKnight	6 – McKnight	3 – Jackson	Leavey Center (1,273); Santa Clara, CA
Dec 9, 2017*; 9:00 p.m., P12N		at Oregon State	L 58–85	0–10	20 – Harper	10 – Harper	3 – Jackson	Gill Coliseum (4,344); Corvallis, OR
Dec 13, 2017*; 9:00 p.m.		at Fresno State	L 52–78	0–11	16 – McKnight	7 – Harper	4 – Toliver	Save Mart Center (4,530); Fresno, CA
Dec 16, 2017*; 8:00 p.m.		at Weber State	L 74–96	0–12	27 – McKnight	8 – McDyess	7 – McKnight	Dee Events Center (6,544); Ogden, UT
Dec 19, 2017*; 6:00 p.m.		at No. 20 Cincinnati	L 49–77	0–13	16 – Harper	8 – Harper	3 – Toliver	BB&T Arena (5,812); Highland Heights, KY
Dec 22, 2017*; 7:00 p.m.		at UT Martin	L 68–74	0–14	17 – McKnight	6 – McDyess	5 – Jackson	Skyhawk Arena (814); Martin, TN
SWAC regular season
Jan 1, 2018; 7:30 p.m.		at Mississippi Valley State	W 80–71	1–14 (1–0)	23 – McKnight	8 – Steen	5 – Jackson	Harrison HPER Complex (2,087); Itta Bena, MS
Jan 6, 2018; 5:30 p.m.		at Alabama A&M	W 69–62	2–14 (2–0)	29 – McKnight	6 – Tied	3 – Jackson	Elmore Gymnasium; Normal, AL
Jan 8, 2018; 5:30 p.m.		at Alabama State	W 94–68	3–14 (3–0)	24 – McKnight	9 – Banyard	9 – McKnight	Dunn–Oliver Acadome (562); Montgomery, AL
Jan 13, 2018; 6:00 p.m.		Southern	W 78–76 ^{OT}	4–14 (4–0)	20 – Toliver	9 – Steen	11 – McKnight	K. L. Johnson Complex (2,600); Pine Bluff, AR
Jan 15, 2018; 7:30 p.m.		Alcorn State	W 71–59	5–14 (5–0)	25 – McKnight	9 – Harper	6 – McKnight	K. L. Johnson Complex (3,100); Pine Bluff, AR
Jan 20, 2018; 5:00 p.m.		at Prairie View A&M	W 72–66	6–14 (6–0)	39 – McKnight	6 – Tied	5 – McKnight	William J. Nicks Building; Prairie View, TX
Jan 22, 2018; 7:30 p.m.		at Texas Southern	W 74–72	7–14 (7–0)	25 – Jackson	9 – Steen	4 – McKnight	Health and Physical Education Arena (2,278); Houston, TX
Jan 27, 2018; 5:30 p.m.		Grambling State	L 68–69	7–15 (7–1)	14 – Jackson	10 – McKnight	5 – McKnight	K. L. Johnson Complex (5,060); Pine Bluff, AR
Jan 29, 2018; 6:30 p.m.		Jackson State	W 60–58	8–15 (8–1)	16 – Banyard	6 – Jackson	5 – McKnight	K. L. Johnson Complex (3,440); Pine Bluff, AR
Feb 3, 2018; 7:00 p.m.		Alabama A&M	W 80–62	9–15 (9–1)	30 – McKnight	10 – McKnight	10 – McKnight	K. L. Johnson Complex (4,457); Pine Bluff, AR
Feb 5, 2018; 5:30 p.m.		Alabama State	L 59–65	9–16 (9–2)	20 – McKnight	8 – Harper	3 – McKnight	K. L. Johnson Complex (3,120); Pine Bluff, AR
Feb 10, 2018; 5:30 p.m.		at Southern	L 62–70	9–17 (9–3)	23 – McKnight	6 – Jackson	4 – McKnight	F. G. Clark Center (1,011); Baton Rouge, LA
Feb 12, 2018; 7:00 p.m.		at Alcorn State	L 52–84	9–18 (9–4)	29 – McKnight	5 – Harper	3 – Toliver	Davey Whitney Complex (478); Lorman, MS
Feb 17, 2018; 7:00 p.m.		Prairie View A&M	L 71–76 ^{OT}	9–19 (9–5)	17 – Tied	8 – Wallace	7 – Jones	K. L. Johnson Complex (2,390); Pine Bluff, AR
Feb 19, 2018; 7:30 p.m.		Texas Southern	W 62–61	10–19 (10–5)	16 – Tied	7 – Tied	6 – McKnight	K. L. Johnson Complex (2,990); Pine Bluff, AR
Feb 24, 2018; 7:30 p.m.		at Grambling State	W 75–66	11–19 (11–5)	16 – Harper	8 – McKnight	3 – Jackson	Hobdy Center (2,700); Grambling, LA
Feb 26, 2018; 7:30 p.m.		at Jackson State	L 48–51	11–20 (11–6)	10 – Harper	9 – Harper	2 – Tied	Williams Assembly Center; Jackson, MS
Mar 3, 2018; 7:30 p.m.		Mississippi Valley State	W 94–57	12–20 (12–6)	18 – McKnight	8 – Steen	7 – Toliver	K. L. Johnson Complex (2,581); Pine Bluff, AR
SWAC tournament
Mar 6, 2018; 7:30 p.m.	(1)	(8) Mississippi Valley State; Quarterfinals	W 77–73	13–20	16 – Tied	4 – 4 tied	7 – McKnight	K. L. Johnson Complex (5,305); Pine Bluff, AR
Mar 9, 2018; 2:30 p.m., ESPN3	(1)	vs. (4) Southern; Semifinals	W 71–65	14–20	28 – McKnight	8 – McKnight	3 – Jackson	Delmar Fieldhouse (1,325); Houston, TX
Mar 10, 2018; 3:00 p.m., ESPN2	(1)	vs. (3) Texas Southern; Championship game	L 69–84	14–21	21 – Harper	7 – Harper	4 – McKnight	Delmar Fieldhouse (1,933); Houston, TX
*Non-conference game. ^{#}Rankings from AP Poll. (#) Tournament seedings in parentheses. All times are in Central Time.
