= 2017–18 Texas Southern Tigers basketball team =

American college basketball season

2017–18 Texas Southern Tigers basketball
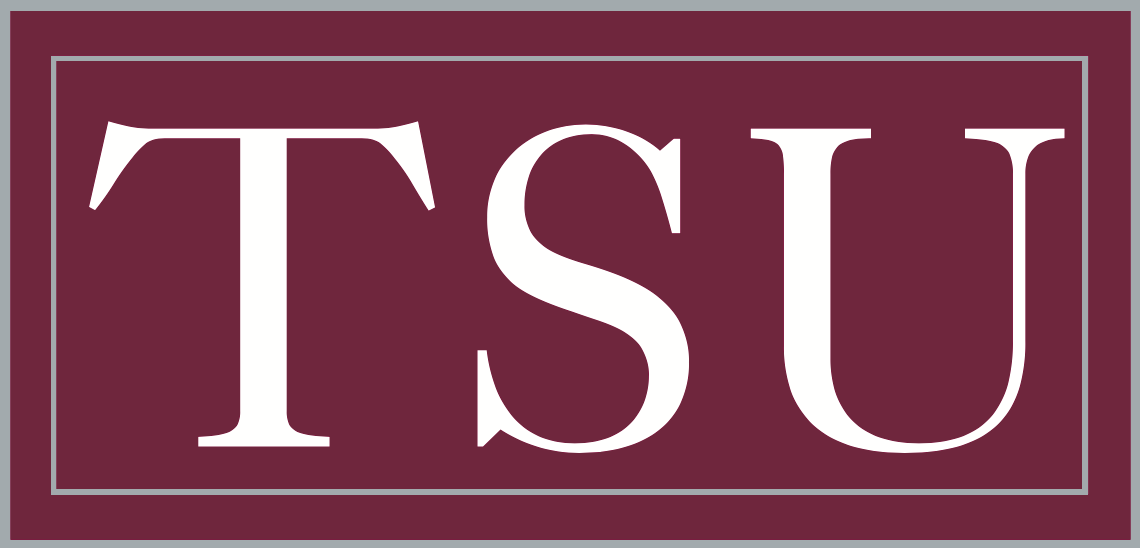

National champions (Black College Sports Page) SWAC tournament champions

NCAA tournament, First Round
- Conference: Southwestern Athletic Conference
- Record: 16–20 (12–6 SWAC)
- Head coach: Mike Davis (6th season)
- Associate head coach: Shyrone Chatman
- Assistant coaches: Michael Davis, Jr.; J. Keith LeGree
- Home arena: Health and Physical Education Arena

2017–18 SWAC men's basketball standings
	Conf.				Overall
Team	W		L	PCT	W		L	PCT
Grambling State*	13	–	5	.722	17	–	14	.548
Prairie View A&M	12	–	6	.667	16	–	18	.471
Texas Southern †	12	–	6	.667	16	–	20	.444
Arkansas–Pine Bluff	12	–	6	.667	14	–	21	.400
Southern	10	–	8	.556	15	–	18	.455
Jackson State	9	–	9	.500	12	–	20	.375
Alabama State	8	–	10	.444	8	–	23	.258
Alcorn State	7	–	11	.389	11	–	21	.344
Mississippi Valley State	4	–	14	.222	4	–	28	.125
Alabama A&M*	3	–	15	.167	3	–	28	.097
† 2018 SWAC tournament winner *ineligible for postseason due to APR violations

The 2017–18 Texas Southern Tigers basketball team represented Texas Southern University during the 2017–18 NCAA Division I men's basketball season. The Tigers, led by sixth-year head coach Mike Davis, played their home games at the Health and Physical Education Arena in Houston, Texas as members of the Southwestern Athletic Conference. They finished the season 16–20, 12–6 in SWAC play to finish in a three-way tie for second place. Due to Grambling State's Academic Progress Rate violations and subsequent postseason ineligibility, they received the No. 3 seed in the SWAC tournament where they defeated Alabama State, Prairie View A&M and Arkansas–Pine Bluff to become SWAC Tournament champions. They received the SWAC's automatic bid to the NCAA tournament where they defeated North Carolina Central in the First Four before losing in the first round to Xavier.

On June 5, 2018, head coach Mike Davis announced he would step down as head coach to become the head coach at Detroit, which was made official on June 13. On June 25, the school hired Nevada associate head coach and former North Texas and LSU head coach Johnny Jones for the job.

== Previous season ==
The Tigers finished the 2016–17 season 23–12, 16–2 in SWAC play to win the regular season SWAC championship. They defeated Alabama State, Grambling State, and Alcorn State to win the SWAC tournament. As a result, they received the SWAC's automatic bid to the NCAA tournament as a No. 16 seed in the East region. There they lost in the first round to North Carolina.

== Roster ==
2017–18 Texas Southern Tigers men's basketball team
Players
Coaches

Pos.	#	Name	Height	Weight	Year	Hometown
G	1	Donte Clark	6 ft 4 in (1.93 m)	195 lb (88 kg)	Sr	Charlotte, North Carolina
G	2	Derrick Bruce	6 ft 3 in (1.91 m)	175 lb (79 kg)	Jr	Moreno Valley, California
G	3	Demontrae Jefferson	5 ft 7 in (1.7 m)	150 lb (68 kg)	So	Milwaukee, Wisconsin
G	4	Kevin Scott	6 ft 4 in (1.93 m)	205 lb (93 kg)	Sr	Omaha, Nebraska
C	5	Trayvon Reed	7 ft 2 in (2.18 m)	240 lb (109 kg)	RS Jr	Mobile, Alabama
G	11	Brian Carey	5 ft 10 in (1.78 m)	160 lb (73 kg)	RS So	Denver, Colorado
F	12	Devocio Butler	6 ft 5 in (1.96 m)	210 lb (95 kg)	Sr	Atlanta, GA
F	14	Lamont Walker	6 ft 5 in (1.96 m)	200 lb (91 kg)	Sr	Chicago, Illinois
F	15	Marquis Salmon	6 ft 8 in (2.03 m)	215 lb (98 kg)	Sr	Lancaster, California
G	20	Cainan McClelland	6 ft 4 in (1.93 m)	165 lb (75 kg)	RS Fr	Houston, Texas
G	23	Divonte Lumpkin	6 ft 1 in (1.85 m)	175 lb (79 kg)	So	Chicago, Illinois
F	24	Justin Hopkins	6 ft 5 in (1.96 m)	215 lb (98 kg)	So	Huntsville, Alabama
F	25	Kevin Granger, Jr.	6 ft 5 in (1.96 m)	194 lb (88 kg)	RS Fr	Houston, Texas
G	30	Robert Lewis	6 ft 4 in (1.93 m)	190 lb (86 kg)	Jr	Compton, California
G		Jerry Perry	6 ft 3 in (1.91 m)	175 lb (79 kg)	Jr	Maumelle, Arkansas

Head coach

- Mike Davis (Alabama)

Assistant coach(es)

- Michael Davis, Jr.
- J. Keith LeGree
- Shyrone Chatman

Legend

- (C) Team captain
- (S) Suspended
- (I) Ineligible
- (W) Walk-on
- Injured
- Current redshirt

Roster
Last update: January 25, 2018

== Schedule and results ==
Date time, TV	Rank^{#}	Opponent^{#}	Result	Record	Site (attendance) city, state
Non-conference regular season
Nov 10, 2017*; 8:00 pm, RTNW		at No. 18 Gonzaga	L 69–97	0–1	McCarthey Athletic Center (6,000); Spokane, WA
Nov 12, 2017*; 3:00 pm, P12N		at Washington State	L 84–86 ^{OT}	0–2	Beasley Coliseum (2,424); Pullman, WA
Nov 16, 2017*; 6:00 pm, BTN		at Ohio State	L 64–82	0–3	Value City Arena (9,984); Columbus, OH
Nov 18, 2017*; 6:00 pm, ACCN Extra		at Syracuse	L 67–80	0–4	Carrier Dome (16,644); Syracuse, NY
Nov 21, 2017*; 7:00 pm		at No. 3 Kansas	L 71–114	0–5	Allen Fieldhouse (16,300); Lawrence, KS
Nov 24, 2017*; 2:00 pm, ACCN Extra		at Clemson	L 77–84	0–6	Littlejohn Coliseum (5,526); Clemson, SC
Nov 30, 2017*; 6:00 pm, ESPN3		at Oakland	L 87–97	0–7	Athletics Center O'Rena (2,854); Rochester, MI
Dec 2, 2017*; 7:00 pm, ESPN3		at Toledo	L 69–71	0–8	Savage Arena (3,199); Toledo, OH
Dec 11, 2017*; 9:00 pm, P12N		at Oregon	L 68–74	0–9	Matthew Knight Arena (6,249); Eugene, OR
Dec 14, 2017*; 7:30 pm, ESPN2		at No. 21 Baylor	L 68–99	0–10	Ferrell Center (5,459); Waco, TX
Dec 16, 2017*; 9:00 pm		at Wyoming	L 66–72	0–11	Arena-Auditorium (4,487); Laramie, WY
Dec 18, 2017*; 7:00 pm, FSSW+		at No. 15 TCU	L 72–91	0–12	Schollmaier Arena (5,925); Fort Worth, TX
Dec 23, 2017*; 8:00 pm, ESPN3		at BYU	L 52–73	0–13	Marriott Center (14,583); Provo, UT
SWAC regular season
Jan 1, 2018; 4:00 pm, ESPNU		Southern	W 78–66	1–13 (1–0)	H&PE Arena (1,007); Houston, TX
Jan 3, 2018; 7:30 pm		Alcorn State	W 85–70	2–13 (2–0)	H&PE Arena (802); Houston, TX
Jan 6, 2018; 7:30 pm		Prairie View A&M	W 100–94	3–13 (3–0)	H&PE Arena (5,128); Houston, TX
Jan 13, 2018; 5:30 pm		at Jackson State	L 80–85 ^{OT}	3–14 (3–1)	Williams Assembly Center (2,499); Jackson, MS
Jan 15, 2018; 7:30 pm		at Grambling State	L 78–79	3–15 (3–2)	Fredrick C. Hobdy Assembly Center (1,243); Grambling, LA
Jan 20, 2018; 7:30 pm		Mississippi Valley State	W 91–77	4–15 (4–2)	H&PE Arena (2,485); Houston, TX
Jan 22, 2018; 7:20 pm		Arkansas–Pine Bluff	L 72–74	4–16 (4–3)	H&PE Arena (2,278); Houston, TX
Jan 27, 2018; 5:30 pm		at Alabama A&M	W 58–56	5–16 (5–3)	Elmore Gymnasium; Normal, AL
Jan 29, 2018; 5:30 pm		at Alabama State	W 97–82	6–16 (6–3)	Dunn–Oliver Acadome (1,237); Montgomery, AL
Feb 3, 2018; 7:30 pm		at Prairie View A&M	L 82–96	6–17 (6–4)	William Nicks Building (3,351); Prairie View, TX
Feb 10, 2018; 7:30 pm		Jackson State	W 86–75	7–17 (7–4)	H&PE Arena (2,028); Houston, TX
Feb 12, 2018; 7:30 pm		Grambling State	L 55–78	7–18 (7–5)	H&PE Arena (3,127); Houston, TX
Feb 17, 2018; 5:30 pm		at Mississippi Valley State	W 72–71	8–18 (8–5)	Harrison HPER Complex (1,515); Itta Bena, MS
Feb 19, 2018; 7:30 pm		at Arkansas–Pine Bluff	L 61–62	8–19 (8–6)	K. L. Johnson Complex (2,990); Pine Bluff, AR
Feb 24, 2018; 7:30 pm		Alabama A&M	W 106–71	9–19 (9–6)	H&PE Arena (1,028); Houston, TX
Feb 26, 2018; 7:30 pm		Alabama State	W 95–77	10–19 (10–6)	H&PE Arena (1,021); Houston, TX
Mar 1, 2018; 7:30 pm		at Southern	W 90–88	11–19 (11–6)	F. G. Clark Center (2,351); Baton Rouge, LA
Mar 3, 2018; 5:30 pm		at Alcorn State	W 78–71	12–19 (12–6)	Davey Whitney Complex (466); Lorman, MS
SWAC tournament
Mar 6, 2018; 8:00 pm, ESPN3	(3)	vs. (6) Alabama State; Quarterfinals	W 90–76	13–19	H&PE Arena (2,481); Houston, TX
Mar 9, 2018; 8:30 pm, ESPN3	(3)	vs. (2) Prairie View A&M; Semifinals	W 88-74	14–19	Delmar Fieldhouse (2,500); Houston, TX
Mar 10, 2018; 4:00 pm, ESPN2	(3)	vs. (1) Arkansas–Pine Bluff; Championship	W 84–69	15–19	Delmar Fieldhouse (1,933); Houston, TX
NCAA tournament
Mar 14, 2018*; 5:40 pm, truTV	(16 W)	vs. (16 W) North Carolina Central; First Four	W 64–46	16–19	UD Arena (12,732); Dayton, OH
Mar 16, 2018*; 6:20 pm, TBS	(16 W)	vs. (1 W) No. 3 Xavier; First Round	L 83–102	16–20	Bridgestone Arena (17,549); Nashville, TN
*Non-conference game. ^{#}Rankings from AP Poll. (#) Tournament seedings in parentheses. W=West. All times are in Central Time.
