= 2018 SWAC men's basketball tournament =

- Classification: Division I
- Season: 2017–18
- Teams: 8
- Site: Delmar Fieldhouse; Houston, Texas
- First round site: Campus sites
- Champions: Texas Southern (8th title)
- Winning coach: Mike Davis (4th title)
- MVP: Trae Jefferson (Texas Southern)
- Television: ESPN3, ESPN2

2017–18 SWAC men's basketball standings
	Conf.				Overall
Team	W		L	PCT	W		L	PCT
Grambling State*	13	–	5	.722	17	–	14	.548
Prairie View A&M	12	–	6	.667	16	–	18	.471
Texas Southern †	12	–	6	.667	16	–	20	.444
Arkansas–Pine Bluff	12	–	6	.667	14	–	21	.400
Southern	10	–	8	.556	15	–	18	.455
Jackson State	9	–	9	.500	12	–	20	.375
Alabama State	8	–	10	.444	8	–	23	.258
Alcorn State	7	–	11	.389	11	–	21	.344
Mississippi Valley State	4	–	14	.222	4	–	28	.125
Alabama A&M*	3	–	15	.167	3	–	28	.097
*ineligible for postseason due to APR violations
† 2018 SWAC tournament winner

The 2018 SWAC men's basketball tournament was the postseason men's basketball tournament for the Southwestern Athletic Conference for the 2017–18 season. Tournament first round games were played at the campus of the higher seeded team on March 6. The remainder of the tournament was held on March 9 and 10, 2018 at the Delmar Fieldhouse in Houston.

Texas Southern won the tournament by defeating Arkansas–Pine Bluff in the championship game, the Tigers' second consecutive championship. As a result, Texas Southern received the conference's automatic bid to the NCAA tournament.

== Seeds ==
The top eight teams competed in the conference tournament. Teams were seeded by record within the conference, with a tiebreaker system to seed teams with identical conference records. Grambling State, the conference's regular season champion, was ineligible for postseason play due to APR violations.

Seed	School	Conference	Tiebreaker
1	Arkansas–Pine Bluff	12–6	3–1 vs Prairie View A&M/Texas Southern
2	Prairie View A&M	12–6	2–2 vs Arkansas–Pine Bluff/Texas Southern
3	Texas Southern	12–6	1–3 vs Arkansas–Pine Bluff/Prairie View A&M
4	Southern	10–8	
5	Jackson State	9–9	
6	Alabama State	8–10	
7	Alcorn State	7–11	
8	Mississippi Valley State	4–14	

== Schedule and results ==
Game	Time	Matchup	Score
Quarterfinals – Tuesday, March 6 – campus sites
1	7:30 pm	No. 8 Mississippi Valley State at No. 1 Arkansas–Pine Bluff	73–77
2	7:30 pm	No. 5 Jackson State at No. 4 Southern	60–62
3	8:30 pm	No. 7 Alcorn State at No. 2 Prairie View A&M	71–87
4	8:00 pm	No. 6 Alabama State at No. 3 Texas Southern	76–90
Semifinals – Friday, March 9 – Delmar Fieldhouse, Houston, TX
5	2:30 pm	No. 1 Arkansas–Pine Bluff vs No. 4 Southern	71–65
6	8:30 pm	No. 2 Prairie View A&M vs No. 3 Texas Southern	74–88
Final – Saturday, March 10 – Delmar Fieldhouse, Houston, TX
7	3:00 pm	No. 1 Arkansas–Pine Bluff vs No. 3 Texas Southern	69–84
Game times in CST. Rankings denote tournament seed.

== Bracket ==
Quarterfinals; March 6 ESPN3
1	Arkansas–Pine Bluff	77
8	Mississippi Valley State	73
4	Southern	62
5	Jackson State	60
2	Prairie View A&M	87
7	Alcorn State	71
3	Texas Southern	90
6	Alabama State	76

Semifinals; March 9 ESPN3
1	Arkansas–Pine Bluff	71
4	Southern	65
2	Prairie View A&M	74
3	Texas Southern	88

Finals; March 10; TV coverage: ESPN2
1	Arkansas–Pine Bluff	69
3	Texas Southern	84

First round games at campus sites of lower-numbered seeds
