= 2017–18 Jackson State Tigers basketball team =

American college basketball season

2017–18 Jackson State Tigers basketball
- Conference: Southwestern Athletic Conference
- Record: 12–20 (9–9 SWAC)
- Head coach: Wayne Brent (5th season)
- Assistant coaches: Cason Burk; De'Suan Dixon
- Home arena: Williams Assembly Center

2017–18 SWAC men's basketball standings
	Conf.				Overall
Team	W		L	PCT	W		L	PCT
Grambling State*	13	–	5	.722	17	–	14	.548
Prairie View A&M	12	–	6	.667	16	–	18	.471
Texas Southern †	12	–	6	.667	16	–	20	.444
Arkansas–Pine Bluff	12	–	6	.667	14	–	21	.400
Southern	10	–	8	.556	15	–	18	.455
Jackson State	9	–	9	.500	12	–	20	.375
Alabama State	8	–	10	.444	8	–	23	.258
Alcorn State	7	–	11	.389	11	–	21	.344
Mississippi Valley State	4	–	14	.222	4	–	28	.125
Alabama A&M*	3	–	15	.167	3	–	28	.097
† 2018 SWAC tournament winner *ineligible for postseason due to APR violations

The 2017–18 Jackson State Tigers basketball team represented Jackson State University during the 2017–18 NCAA Division I men's basketball season. The Tigers, led by fifth-year head coach Wayne Brent, played their home games at the Williams Assembly Center in Jackson, Mississippi as members of the Southwestern Athletic Conference. They finished the season 12–20, 9–9 in SWAC play to finish in sixth place. Due to Grambling State's ineligibility, they received the No. 5 seed in the SWAC tournament where they lost to Southern in the quarterfinals.

== Previous season ==
The Tigers finished the 2016–17 season 14–18, 10–8 in SWAC play to finish in a four-way tie for third place. As the No. 6 seed in the SWAC tournament, they lost to Southern in the quarterfinals.

== Roster ==
2017–18 Jackson State Tigers men's basketball team
Players
Coaches

Pos.	#	Name	Height	Weight	Year	Hometown
G/F	0	Chace Franklin	6 ft 5 in (1.96 m)	195 lb (88 kg)	Sr	Dallas, Texas
G/F	1	Charles Taylor Jr.	6 ft 4 in (1.93 m)	190 lb (86 kg)	Jr	Washington, D.C.
G	2	Dontelius Ross	5 ft 10 in (1.78 m)	165 lb (75 kg)	Jr	Jackson, Mississippi
G	3	Julian Daughtry	6 ft 3 in (1.91 m)	195 lb (88 kg)	Jr	Memphis, Tennessee
G/F	4	Payton Wilson	6 ft 7 in (2.01 m)	210 lb (95 kg)	Jr	Tampa, Florida
G	5	Paris Collins	6 ft 4 in (1.93 m)	186 lb (84 kg)	Sr	San Antonio, Texas
G	11	Jeremiah Jefferson	6 ft 2 in (1.88 m)	183 lb (83 kg)	Jr	Glenn Heights, Texas
F	12	Maurice Rivers	6 ft 7 in (2.01 m)	205 lb (93 kg)	Jr	Atlanta, Georgia
G	13	Jordan Berry	6 ft 1 in (1.85 m)	170 lb (77 kg)	Fr	DeSoto, Texas
F	15	James Glenn	6 ft 7 in (2.01 m)	230 lb (104 kg)	Jr	Seattle, Washington
G	20	Tyler Berryhill	5 ft 10 in (1.78 m)	160 lb (73 kg)	Fr	Webb, Mississippi
C	21	Demetrice Clopton	6 ft 9 in (2.06 m)	255 lb (116 kg)	Fr	Columbus, Mississippi
F	22	Treshawn Bolden	6 ft 8 in (2.03 m)	250 lb (113 kg)	Sr	Jackson, Mississippi
F	23	Darius Austin	6 ft 7 in (2.01 m)	230 lb (104 kg)	Jr	Centreville, Illinois
G	24	Jeremiah Bozeman	6 ft 2 in (1.88 m)	175 lb (79 kg)	Fr	Alva, Oklahoma
G	25	Jesse Love	6 ft 1 in (1.85 m)	185 lb (84 kg)	So	Jackson, Mississippi
G	31	Lemmie Howard	6 ft 7 in (2.01 m)	200 lb (91 kg)	Fr	Belzoni, Mississippi
G	33	Justin Jordan	6 ft 5 in (1.96 m)	190 lb (86 kg)	RS Fr	Seattle, Washington

Head coach

- Wayne Brent (Louisiana–Monroe)

Assistant coach(es)

- Cason Burk
- De'Suan Dixon

Legend

- (C) Team captain
- (S) Suspended
- (I) Ineligible
- (W) Walk-on
- Injured
- Current redshirt

Roster
Last update: January 27, 2018

== Schedule and results ==
Date time, TV	Rank^{#}	Opponent^{#}	Result	Record	Site (attendance) city, state
Non-conference regular season
Nov 10, 2017*; 12:15 pm		Milsaps	W 84–46	1–0	Williams Assembly Center (929); Jackson, MS
Nov 14, 2017*; 6:00 pm, ESPN3		at Mercer	L 58–86	1–1	Hawkins Arena (2,742); Macon, GA
Nov 18, 2017*; 3:00 pm		at St. Bonaventure	L 58–72	1–2	Reilly Center (3,619); St. Bonaventure, NY
Nov 20, 2017*; 6:00 pm, BTN		at Maryland; Emerald Coast Classic campus game	L 45–76	1–3	Xfinity Center (13,103); College Park, MD
Nov 24, 2017*; 1:30 pm		vs. Maryland Eastern Shore; Emerald Coast Classic first round	L 63–66	1–4	The Arena at Northwest Florida State (200); Niceville, FL
Nov 25, 2017*; 10:00 am		vs. Omaha; Emerald Coast Classic 3rd place game	W 75–73 ^{OT}	2–4	The Arena at Northwest Florida State (125); Niceville, FL
Nov 28, 2017*; 7:00 pm		at Louisiana–Monroe	L 52–65	2–5	Fant–Ewing Coliseum (1,284); Monroe, LA
Dec 1, 2017*; 6:00 pm, ESPN3		at Central Michigan	L 63–70	2–6	McGuirk Arena (2,444); Mount Pleasant, MI
Dec 9, 2017*; 6:00 pm		at Louisiana Tech	L 62–91	2–7	Thomas Assembly Center (2,668); Ruston, LA
Dec 11, 2017*; 6:00 pm		Fisk	W 60–53	3–7	Williams Assembly Center (821); Jackson, MS
Dec 13, 2017*; 7:00 pm		at Southern Illinois	L 51–69	3–8	SIU Arena (2,151); Carbondale, IL
Dec 20, 2017*; 6:00 pm, ESPN3		at Toledo	L 57–83	3–9	Savage Arena (3,410); Toledo, OH
Dec 22, 2017*; 6:00 pm, ESPN3		at Ball State	L 54–70	3–10	Worthen Arena (3,126); Muncie, IN
SWAC regular season
Jan 1, 2018; 7:45 pm		Alabama State	W 82–73	4–10 (1–0)	Williams Assembly Center (807); Jackson, MS
Jan 3, 2018; 7:30 pm		Alabama A&M	W 59–56	5–10 (2–0)	Williams Assembly Center (1,019); Jackson, MS
Jan 6, 2018; 5:30 pm		at Alcorn State	W 60–55	6–10 (3–0)	Davey Whitney Complex (884); Lorman, MS
Jan 8, 2018; 7:30 pm		at Southern	W 65–61	7–10 (4–0)	F. G. Clark Center (1,129); Baton Rouge, LA
Jan 13, 2018; 5:30 pm		Texas Southern	W 85–80 ^{OT}	8–10 (5–0)	Williams Assembly Center (2,499); Jackson, MS
Jan 15, 2018; 7:30 pm		Prairie View A&M	W 79–71	9–10 (6–0)	Williams Assembly Center (1,539); Jackson, MS
Jan 20, 2018; 5:30 pm		Grambling State	L 45–72	9–11 (6–1)	Williams Assembly Center (4,309); Jackson, MS
Jan 27, 2018; 4:00 pm		at Mississippi Valley State	L 67–72	9–12 (6–2)	Harrison HPER Complex (4,397); Itta Bena, MS
Jan 29, 2018; 6:30 pm		at Arkansas–Pine Bluff	L 58–60	9–13 (6–3)	K. L. Johnson Complex (3,440); Pine Bluff, AR
Feb 3, 2018; 5:30 pm		Alcorn State	W 60–57	10–13 (7–3)	Williams Assembly Center (5,827); Jackson, MS
Feb 5, 2018; 8:00 pm, ESPNU		Southern	L 62–67	10–14 (7–4)	Williams Assembly Center (3,996); Jackson, MS
Feb 10, 2018; 7:30 pm		at Texas Southern	L 75–86	10–15 (7–5)	H&PE Arena (2,028); Houston, TX
Feb 12, 2018; 8:00 pm		at Prairie View A&M	L 58–63	10–16 (7–6)	William J. Nicks Building (2,465); Prairie View, TX
Feb 17, 2018; 5:30 pm		at Grambling State	L 64–71	10–17 (7–7)	Fredrick C. Hobdy Assembly Center (1,207); Grambling, LA
Feb 24, 2018; 5:30 pm		Mississippi Valley State	W 60–59	11–17 (8–7)	Williams Assembly Center; Jackson, MS
Feb 26, 2018; 7:30 pm		Arkansas–Pine Bluff	W 51–48	12–17 (9–7)	Williams Assembly Center; Jackson, MS
Mar 1, 2018; 5:30 pm		at Alabama State	L 60–62	12–18 (9–8)	Dunn–Oliver Acadome (1,673); Montgomery, AL
Mar 3, 2018; 5:30 pm		at Alabama A&M	L 59–66	12–19 (9–9)	Elmore Gymnasium (413); Normal, AL
SWAC tournament
Mar 6, 2018; 7:30 pm	(5)	vs. (4) Southern; Quarterfinals	L 60–62	12–20	F. G. Clark Center (2,059); Baton Rouge, LA
*Non-conference game. ^{#}Rankings from AP Poll. (#) Tournament seedings in parentheses. All times are in Central Time.
