= 2017–18 Alabama A&M Bulldogs basketball team =

American college basketball season

2017–18 Alabama A&M Bulldogs basketball
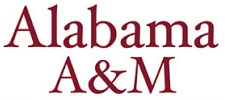
- Conference: Southwestern Athletic Conference
- Record: 3–28 (3–15 SWAC)
- Head coach: Donnie Marsh (1st season)
- Assistant coaches: Dylan Howard; Tyler Marsh
- Home arena: Elmore Gymnasium

2017–18 SWAC men's basketball standings
	Conf.				Overall
Team	W		L	PCT	W		L	PCT
Grambling State*	13	–	5	.722	17	–	14	.548
Prairie View A&M	12	–	6	.667	16	–	18	.471
Texas Southern †	12	–	6	.667	16	–	20	.444
Arkansas–Pine Bluff	12	–	6	.667	14	–	21	.400
Southern	10	–	8	.556	15	–	18	.455
Jackson State	9	–	9	.500	12	–	20	.375
Alabama State	8	–	10	.444	8	–	23	.258
Alcorn State	7	–	11	.389	11	–	21	.344
Mississippi Valley State	4	–	14	.222	4	–	28	.125
Alabama A&M*	3	–	15	.167	3	–	28	.097
† 2018 SWAC tournament winner *ineligible for postseason due to APR violations

The 2017–18 Alabama A&M Bulldogs basketball team represented Alabama A&M University during the 2017–18 NCAA Division I men's basketball season. The Bulldogs, led by first-year head coach Donnie Marsh, played their home games at the Elmore Gymnasium in Normal, Alabama as members of the Southwestern Athletic Conference. The Bulldogs finished the season 3–28, 3–15 in SWAC play to finish in last place. Alabama A&M was ineligible for postseason play due to APR violations.

On May 11, 2018, Donnie Marsh resigned after just one season as head coach. Six days later, A&M associate head coach Dylan Howard was named interim head coach of the team for the 2018–19 season.

== Previous season ==
The Bulldogs finished the 2016–17 season 2–27, 2–16 in SWAC play to finish in last place. They did not qualify for the SWAC tournament.

On March 7, head coach Willie Hayes resigned. He finished at Alabama A&M with a six year record of 54–121. On April 12, the school named Texas Southern assistant and former Florida International head coach Donnie Marsh the new head coach.

== Roster ==
2017–18 Alabama A&M Bulldogs men's basketball team
Players
Coaches

Pos.	#	Name	Height	Weight	Year	Hometown
G	2	Ariston Johnson	6 ft 0 in (1.83 m)	190 lb (86 kg)	So	Virginia Beach, Virginia
G	3	De'Ederick Petty	6 ft 0 in (1.83 m)	175 lb (79 kg)	So	Bessemer, Alabama
G	4	Marcus Merriweather	6 ft 2 in (1.88 m)	180 lb (82 kg)	Sr	Pinson, Alabama
G	10	Arthur Johnson	6 ft 2 in (1.88 m)	195 lb (88 kg)	Jr	Marion, Alabama
F	11	Andre Kennedy	6 ft 7 in (2.01 m)	205 lb (93 kg)	Jr	Albany, Georgia
G	12	Amari Goulbourne	5 ft 11 in (1.8 m)	170 lb (77 kg)	Fr	Riverview, Florida
G	15	Walter Jones, Jr.	6 ft 5 in (1.96 m)	200 lb (91 kg)	RS Jr	Greensboro, Alabama
G	20	Julian Walters	5 ft 10 in (1.78 m)	175 lb (79 kg)	Jr	Madison, Wisconsin
G	22	Jalen Reeder	6 ft 5 in (1.96 m)	185 lb (84 kg)	Jr	Kissimmee, Florida
F	24	Evan Wiley	6 ft 7 in (2.01 m)	200 lb (91 kg)	So	Huntsville, Alabama
F	30	Brandon Houston	6 ft 7 in (2.01 m)	260 lb (118 kg)	Fr	Birmingham, Alabama
G	33	Terry Ellis, Jr.	6 ft 2 in (1.88 m)	160 lb (73 kg)	Fr	Cibolo, Texas
F	35	Tracey Burnett	6 ft 4 in (1.93 m)	275 lb (125 kg)	So	Huntsville, Alabama
G	41	Brandon Miller	6 ft 0 in (1.83 m)	170 lb (77 kg)	RS So	Huntsville, Alabama

Head coach

- Donnie Marsh (Franklin & Marshall)

Assistant coach(es)

- Dylan Howard (UAB)
- Tyler Marsh (Birmingham–Southern)

Legend

- (C) Team captain
- (S) Suspended
- (I) Ineligible
- (W) Walk-on
- Injured
- Current redshirt

Roster
Last update: January 24, 2018

== Schedule and results ==
Date time, TV	Opponent	Result	Record	Site (attendance) city, state
Non-conference regular season
Nov 11, 2017*; 2:00 pm, ESPN3	at Ohio	L 53–61	0–1	Convocation Center (4,037); Athens, OH
Nov 13, 2017*; 7:00 pm	at Samford	L 68–87	0–2	Pete Hanna Center (1,885); Homewood, AL
Nov 17, 2017*; 6:00 pm, SECN+	at Alabama; Barclays Center Classic campus game	L 67–104	0–3	Coleman Coliseum (11,948); Tuscaloosa, AL
Nov 21, 2017*; 7:00 pm, BTN	at No. 14 Minnesota; Barclays Center Classic campus game	L 57–100	0–4	Williams Arena (10,704); Minneapolis, MN
Nov 24, 2017*; 4:00 pm	at Niagara; Barclays Center Classic regional semifinals	L 74–96	0–5	Gallagher Center (842); Lewiston, NY
Nov 25, 2017*; 3:00 pm	vs. Western Carolina; Barclays Center Classic regional 3rd place game	L 72–82	0–6	Gallagher Center; Lewiston, NY
Nov 29, 2017*; 7:00 pm	Georgia State	L 53–63	0–7	Elmore Gymnasium (1,979); Normal, AL
Dec 2, 2017*; 3:30 pm	at Austin Peay	L 47–67	0–8	Dunn Center (1,417); Clarksville, TN
Dec 11, 2017*; 8:00 pm, FS1	at DePaul	L 59–83	0–9	Wintrust Arena (4,508); Chicago, IL
Dec 13, 2017*; 6:00 pm	Southern Miss	L 54–69	0–10	Elmore Gymnasium (382); Normal, AL
Dec 16, 2017*; 2:15 pm	vs. UAB; BHM JAM	L 58–90	0–11	Legacy Arena (7,209); Birmingham, AL
Dec 21, 2017*; 9:00 pm, ESPNU	at Michigan	L 47–97	0–12	Crisler Center (9,325); Ann Arbor, MI
Dec 23, 2017*; 12:00 pm, FS1	at Georgetown	L 49–89	0–13	Capital One Arena (5,149); Washington, D.C.
SWAC regular season
Jan 1, 2018; 7:30 pm	at Grambling State	W 71–64	1–13 (1–0)	Fredrick C. Hobdy Assembly Center (231); Grambling, LA
Jan 3, 2018; 7:30 pm	at Jackson State	L 56–59	1–14 (1–1)	Williams Assembly Center (1,019); Jackson, MS
Jan 6, 2018; 5:30 pm	Arkansas–Pine Bluff	L 62–69	1–15 (1–2)	Elmore Gymnasium (562); Normal, AL
Jan 8, 2018; 7:30 pm	Mississippi Valley State	W 65–55	2–15 (2–2)	Elmore Gymnasium (858); Normal, AL
Jan 13, 2018; 3:00 pm	at Alabama State	L 67–70	2–16 (2–3)	Dunn–Oliver Acadome; Montgomery, AL
Jan 20, 2018; 5:30 pm	at Alcorn State	L 52–68	2–17 (2–4)	Davey Whitney Complex (362); Lorman, MS
Jan 22, 2018; 7:30 pm	at Southern	L 61–62	2–18 (2–5)	F. G. Clark Center (1,109); Baton Rouge, LA
Jan 27, 2018; 5:30 pm	Texas Southern	L 56–58	2–19 (2–6)	Elmore Gymnasium; Normal, AL
Jan 29, 2018; 7:30 pm	Prairie View A&M	L 67–88	2–20 (2–7)	Elmore Gymnasium (423); Normal, AL
Feb 3, 2018; 7:00 pm	at Arkansas–Pine Bluff	L 62–80	2–21 (2–8)	K. L. Johnson Complex (4,457); Pine Bluff, AR
Feb 5, 2018; 7:30 pm	at Mississippi Valley State	L 67–77	2–22 (2–9)	Harrison HPER Complex (1,198); Itta Bena, MS
Feb 10, 2018; 3:00 pm	Alabama State	L 50–69	2–23 (2–10)	Elmore Gymnasium (4,400); Normal, AL
Feb 17, 2018; 5:30 pm	Alcorn State	L 60–80	2–24 (2–11)	Elmore Gymnasium (1,527); Normal, AL
Feb 19, 2018; 7:30 pm	Southern	L 50–60	2–25 (2–12)	Elmore Gymnasium (357); Normal, AL
Feb 24, 2018; 7:30 pm	at Texas Southern	L 71–106	2–26 (2–13)	H&PE Arena (1,028); Houston, TX
Feb 26, 2018; 7:30 pm	at Prairie View A&M	L 58–71	2–27 (2–14)	William J. Nicks Building (1,443); Prairie View, TX
Mar 1, 2018; 7:30 pm	Grambling State	L 74–84 ^{OT}	2–28 (2–15)	Elmore Gymnasium; Normal, AL
Mar 3, 2018; 5:30 pm	Jackson State	W 66–59	3–28 (3–15)	Elmore Gymnasium (413); Normal, AL
*Non-conference game. ^{#}Rankings from AP Poll. (#) Tournament seedings in parentheses. All times are in Central Time.
