= 2017–18 Alcorn State Braves basketball team =

American college basketball season

2017–18 Alcorn State Braves basketball
- Conference: Southwestern Athletic Conference
- Record: 11–21 (7–11 SWAC)
- Head coach: Montez Robinson (3rd season)
- Assistant coaches: Delvin Thompson; Derek Thompson; Frank Popieski
- Home arena: Davey Whitney Complex

2017–18 SWAC men's basketball standings
	Conf.				Overall
Team	W		L	PCT	W		L	PCT
Grambling State*	13	–	5	.722	17	–	14	.548
Prairie View A&M	12	–	6	.667	16	–	18	.471
Texas Southern †	12	–	6	.667	16	–	20	.444
Arkansas–Pine Bluff	12	–	6	.667	14	–	21	.400
Southern	10	–	8	.556	15	–	18	.455
Jackson State	9	–	9	.500	12	–	20	.375
Alabama State	8	–	10	.444	8	–	23	.258
Alcorn State	7	–	11	.389	11	–	21	.344
Mississippi Valley State	4	–	14	.222	4	–	28	.125
Alabama A&M*	3	–	15	.167	3	–	28	.097
† 2018 SWAC tournament winner *ineligible for postseason due to APR violations

The 2017–18 Alcorn State Braves basketball team represented Alcorn State University during the 2017–18 NCAA Division I men's basketball season. The Braves, led by third-year head coach Montez Robinson, played their home games at the Davey Whitney Complex in Lorman, Mississippi as members of the Southwestern Athletic Conference. They finished the season 11–21, 7–11 in SWAC play to finish in eighth place. Due to Grambling State's ineligibility, they received the No. 7 seed in the SWAC tournament where they lost in the quarterfinals to Prairie View A&M.

== Previous season ==
The Braves finished the 2016–17 season 18–14, 13–5 in SWAC play to finish in second place.

The Braves were ineligible for NCAA postseason play due to APR violations for the second straight year. However, they were allowed to participate in the SWAC tournament where they defeated Mississippi Valley State and Southern to advance to the championship game where they lost to Texas Southern.

== Roster ==
2017–18 Alcorn State Braves men's basketball team
Players
Coaches

Pos.	#	Name	Height	Weight	Year	Hometown
G	0	James Stokes	6 ft 0 in (1.83 m)	175 lb (79 kg)	Sr	Utica, Mississippi
G	1	Avery Patterson	6 ft 2 in (1.88 m)	195 lb (88 kg)	Sr	Decatur, Georgia
G	2	A.J. Mosby	6 ft 3 in (1.91 m)	160 lb (73 kg)	Sr	Cartersville, Georgia
F	3	Tyler Carter	6 ft 7 in (2.01 m)	200 lb (91 kg)	So	Houston, Texas
F	4	Dante Sterling	6 ft 6 in (1.98 m)	200 lb (91 kg)	Jr	Fayetteville, Georgia
G	5	Maurice Howard	6 ft 1 in (1.85 m)	190 lb (86 kg)	So	Quincy, Florida
F	10	Kobe Wilson	6 ft 9 in (2.06 m)	220 lb (100 kg)	RS Fr	Kennesaw, Georgia
G	12	Juwan Henderson	5 ft 7 in (1.7 m)	140 lb (64 kg)	Sr	Atlanta, Georgia
F	15	Harold Givens	6 ft 7 in (2.01 m)	200 lb (91 kg)	Jr	Atlanta, Georgia
F	20	Yalen Reed	6 ft 7 in (2.01 m)	200 lb (91 kg)	So	Nashville, Tennessee
F	22	TyQuaylon Smith	6 ft 8 in (2.03 m)	200 lb (91 kg)	Jr	Jackson, Louisiana
G	23	Troymain Crosby	6 ft 4 in (1.93 m)	180 lb (82 kg)	Fr	Laurel, Mississippi
F	24	Reginal Johnson	6 ft 5 in (1.96 m)	250 lb (113 kg)	Sr	Monroe, Louisiana
F	33	Noah Plain	6 ft 8 in (2.03 m)	200 lb (91 kg)	So	Baton Rouge, Louisiana
G	35	Khari Jabriel Allen	6 ft 4 in (1.93 m)	180 lb (82 kg)	Jr	Muncie, Indiana
F	50	Devon Brewer	6 ft 8 in (2.03 m)	260 lb (118 kg)	So	Hiram, Georgia

Head coach

- Montez Robinson (North Georgia)

Assistant coach(es)

- Delvin Thompson (Alcorn State)
- Derek Thompson (Morris Brown)
- Frank Popieski (Florida State)

Legend

- (C) Team captain
- (S) Suspended
- (I) Ineligible
- (W) Walk-on
- Injured
- Current redshirt

Roster
Last update: January 24, 2018

== Schedule and results ==
Date time, TV	Rank^{#}	Opponent^{#}	Result	Record	Site (attendance) city, state
Non-conference regular season
Nov 10, 2017*; 8:00 pm, SECN+		at LSU	L 59–99	0–1	Pete Maravich Assembly Center (11,856); Baton Rouge, LA
Nov 12, 2017*; 7:00 pm, FS1		at Creighton	L 72–109	0–2	CenturyLink Center Omaha (14,730); Omaha, NE
Nov 13, 2017*; 8:00 pm, ESPN3		at Northern Iowa	L 45–73	0–3	McLeod Center (3,385); Cedar Falls, IA
Nov 17, 2017*; 8:00 pm, FCS		at No. 25 Baylor	L 61–78	0–4	Ferrell Center (5,330); Waco, TX
Nov 19, 2017*; 8:00 pm		at Central Arkansas	L 76–102	0–5	Farris Center (542); Conway, AR
Nov 22, 2017*; 1:30 pm		Yale	W 87–73	0–6	Davey Whitney Complex (177); Lorman, MS
Nov 25, 2017*; 6:00 pm		Concordia (AL)	W 103–56	1–6	Davey Whitney Complex (143); Lorman, MS
Nov 29, 2017*; 8:00 pm, CST		at Tulane	L 65–81	1–7	Devlin Fieldhouse (1,427); New Orleans, LA
Dec 1, 2017*; 8:00 pm		Rust	W 89–50	2–7	Davey Whitney Complex (352); Lorman, MS
Dec 10, 2017*; 6:00 pm		at Iowa State	L 58–78	2–8	Hilton Coliseum (14,112); Ames, IA
Dec 12, 2017*; 8:00 pm		Fisk	W 77–69	3–8	Davey Whitney Complex (117); Lorman, MS
Dec 18, 2017*; 8:00 pm		Blue Mountain	W 83–56	4–8	Davey Whitney Complex (119); Lorman, MS
Dec 22, 2017*; 7:00 pm, SECN+		at Vanderbilt	L 51–92	4–9	Memorial Gymnasium (Vanderbilt University) (8,125); Nashville, TN
SWAC regular season
Jan 1, 2018; 6:00 pm		at Prairie View A&M	L 64–76	4–10 (0–1)	William Nicks Building (231); Prairie View, TX
Jan 3, 2018; 8:30 pm		at Texas Southern	L 70–85	4–11 (0–2)	H&PE Arena (802); Houston, TX
Jan 6, 2018; 6:30 pm		Jackson State	L 55–60	4–12 (0–3)	Davey Whitney Complex (884); Lorman, MS
Jan 8, 2018; 8:00 pm		Grambling State	L 61–72	4–13 (0–4)	Davey Whitney Complex (744); Lorman, MS
Jan 13, 2018; 5:00 pm		at Mississippi Valley State	W 77–63	5–13 (1–4)	Harrison HPER Complex (3,287); Itta Bena, MS
Jan 15, 2018; 8:30 pm		at Arkansas–Pine Bluff	L 59–71	5–14 (1–5)	K. L. Johnson Complex (3,100); Pine Bluff, AR
Jan 20, 2018; 6:30 pm		Alabama A&M	W 68–52	6–14 (2–5)	Davey Whitney Complex (362); Lorman, MS
Jan 22, 2018; 8:00 pm		Alabama State	W 81–64	7–14 (3–5)	Davey Whitney Complex (653); Lorman, MS
Jan 27, 2018; 6:30 pm		at Southern Jaguars	L 48–61	7–15 (3–6)	F. G. Clark Activity Center (1,178); Baton Rouge, LA
Feb 3, 2018; 6:30 pm		at Jackson State	L 57–60	7–16 (3–7)	Williams Assembly Center (5,827); Jackson, MS
Feb 5, 2018; 8:30 pm		at Grambling State	L 72–81	7–17 (3–8)	Fredrick C. Hobdy Assembly Center (1,160); Grambling, LA
Feb 10, 2018; 6:30 pm		Mississippi Valley State	W 94–90 ^{OT}	8–17 (4–8)	Davey Whitney Complex (588); Lorman, MS
Feb 12, 2018; 8:00 pm		Arkansas–Pine Bluff	W 84–52	9–17 (5–8)	Davey Whitney Complex (478); Lorman, MS
Feb 17, 2018; 6:30 pm		at Alabama A&M	W 80–60	10–17 (6–8)	Elmore Gymnasium (1,527); Normal, AL
Feb 19, 2018; 9:00 pm, ESPNU		at Alabama State	L 62–82	10–18 (6–9)	Dunn-Oliver Acadome (1,252); Montgomery, AL
Feb 24, 2018; 6:30 pm		Southern Jaguars	W 89–85	11–18 (7–9)	Davey Whitney Complex (472); Lorman, MS
Mar 1, 2018; 8:00 pm		Prairie View A&M	L 69–79	11–19 (7–10)	Davey White Complex (251); Lorman, MS
Mar 3, 2018; 6:30 pm		Texas Southern	L 71–78	11–20 (7–11)	Davey White Complex (466); Lorman, MS
SWAC tournament
Mar 6, 2018; 8:30 pm	(7)	at (2) Prairie View A&M; Quarterfinals	L 71–87	11–21	William Nicks Building (1,252); Prairie View, TX
*Non-conference game. ^{#}Rankings from AP Poll. (#) Tournament seedings in parentheses. All times are in Eastern Time.
