= 2017–18 Oregon Ducks men's basketball team =

American college basketball season

2017–18 Oregon Ducks men's basketball

NIT, Second Round
- Conference: Pac-12 Conference
- Record: 23–13 (10–8 Pac-12)
- Head coach: Dana Altman (8th season)
- Assistant coaches: Kevin McKenna; Tony Stubblefield; Mike Mennenga
- Home arena: Matthew Knight Arena

2017–18 Pac-12 Conference men's basketball standings
	Conf.				Overall
Team	W		L	PCT	W		L	PCT
No. 12 Arizona †	14	–	4	.778	27	–	8	.771
USC	12	–	6	.667	24	–	12	.667
UCLA	11	–	7	.611	21	–	12	.636
Utah	11	–	7	.611	23	–	12	.657
Stanford	11	–	7	.611	19	–	16	.543
Oregon	10	–	8	.556	23	–	13	.639
Washington	10	–	8	.556	21	–	13	.618
Colorado	8	–	10	.444	17	–	15	.531
Arizona State	8	–	10	.444	20	–	12	.625
Oregon State	7	–	11	.389	16	–	16	.500
Washington State	4	–	14	.222	12	–	19	.387
California	2	–	16	.111	8	–	24	.250
† Pac-12 Tournament winner Rankings from AP poll

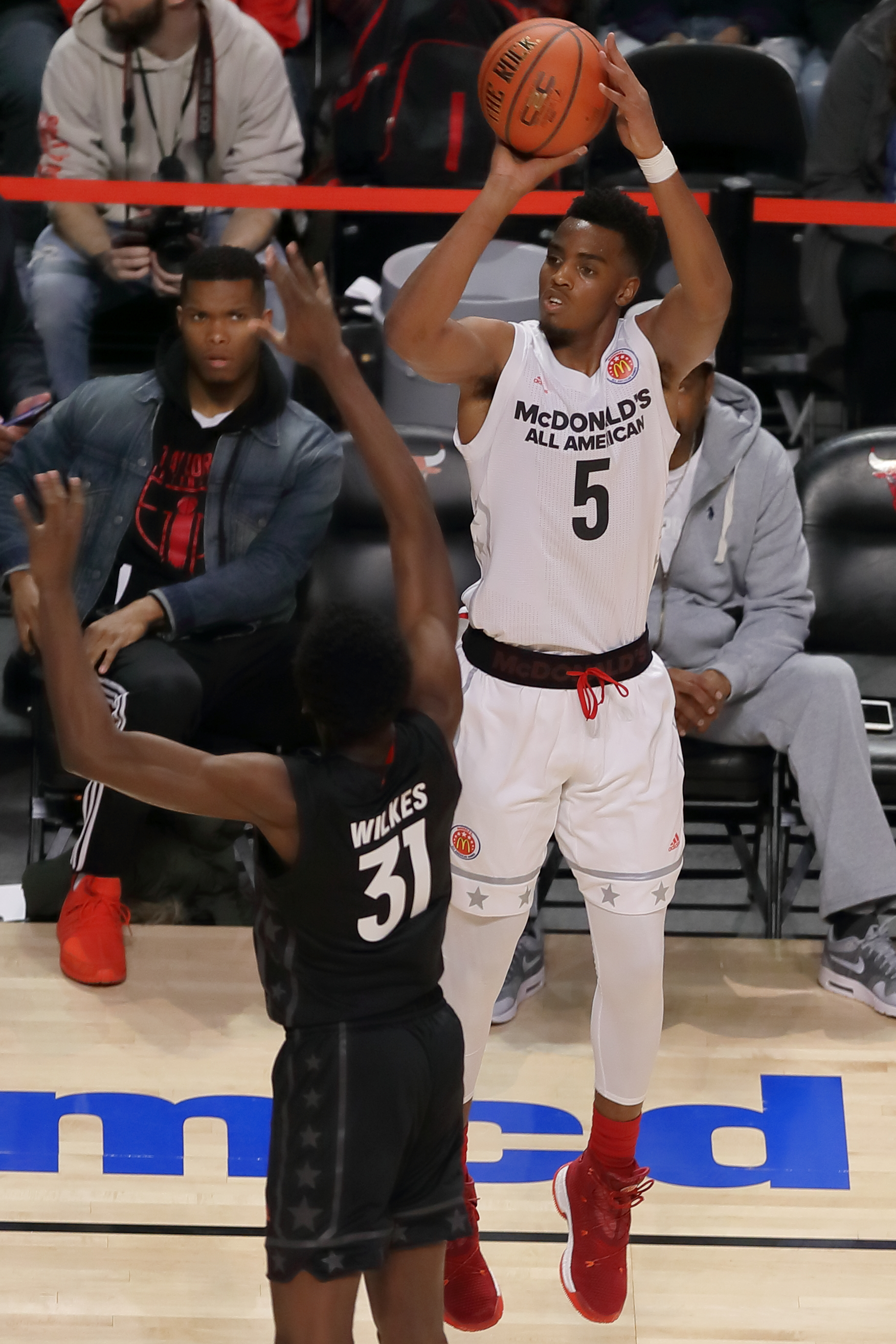
Oregon recruit Troy Brown Jr. at the 2017 McDonald's All-American Boys Game.

The 2017–18 Oregon Ducks men's basketball team represented the University of Oregon during the 2017–18 NCAA Division I men's basketball season. The Ducks, led by eighth-year head coach Dana Altman, played their home games at Matthew Knight Arena as members of the Pac–12 Conference. They finished the season 23–13, 10–8 in Pac-12 play to finish in a tie for sixth place. As the No. 6 seed in the Pac-12 tournament, they defeated Washington State in the first round and Utah in the quarterfinals before being defeated by USC in the semifinals. They received an invitation to the National Invitation Tournament, where they defeated Rider in the first round before losing to Marquette in the second round.

== Previous season ==
The Ducks finished the 2016–17 season 33–6, 16–2 in Pac-12 play to win a share of the regular season Pac-12 championship. They defeated Arizona State and California in the Pac-12 tournament before losing in the final to Arizona. They received an at-large bid to the NCAA tournament as a No. 3 seed in the Midwest Region where they defeated Iona and Rhode Island to advance to the Sweet Sixteen. In the Sweet Sixteen, they defeated Michigan to advance to the Elite Eight where they defeated Kansas. The win marked the first time the Ducks advanced to the Final Four since 1939. There, they lost to the eventual champions, North Carolina.

== Off-season ==
=== Departures ===
Name	Pos.	Height	Weight	Year	Hometown	Reason for departure
Dylan Ennis	G	6'2"	195	GS	Bramton, ON	Graduated
Chris Boucher	F	6'10"	200	Sr.	Montreal, QC	Graduated; Undrafted; GSW
Charlie Noebel	G	6'2"	178	Sr.	Irvine, CA	Walk-on; Graduated
Kavell Bigby-Williams	F	6'11"	230	Jr.	London, GB	Transferred to LSU
Jordan Bell	F	6'9"	225	Jr.	Long Beach, CA	Declared for 2017 NBA draft; Drafted 38th Overall by CHI; traded to GSW for financial compensation
Dillon Brooks	F	6'7"	225	Jr.	Mississauga, ON	Declared for 2017 NBA draft; Drafted 45th Overall by HOU; Traded to MEM for 2nd Round Pick
Casey Benson	G	6'3"	185	Jr.	Tempe, AZ	Graduate transferred to Grand Canyon
Tyler Dorsey	G	6'4"	195	So.	Los Angeles, CA	Declared for 2017 NBA draft; Drafted 41st Overall to ATL

=== Incoming transfers ===
Name	Pos.	Height	Weight	Year	Hometown	Notes
Elijah Brown	G	6'4"	200	RS Sr.	Orange County, CA	Graduate transfer from New Mexico, Brown is eligible to play immediately for the 2017–18 season.
MiKyle McIntosh	F	6'7"	234	RS Jr.	Pickering, ON	Graduate transfer from Illinois State, McIntosh is eligible to play immediately for the 2017–18 season.

=== 2017 recruiting class ===
College recruiting information
Name	Hometown	School	Height	Weight	Commit date
Victor Bailey Jr. G	Austin, TX	McNeil HS	6 ft 3 in (1.91 m)	170 lb (77 kg)	Oct 11, 2016
Victor Bailey Jr. G	Recruit ratings: Scout: Rivals: 247Sports: ESPN: (82)				
Abu Kigab; SF	St. Catharines, ON	Prolific Prep	6 ft 6.5 in (1.99 m)	200 lb (91 kg)	Oct 14, 2016
Abu Kigab; SF	Recruit ratings: Scout: Rivals: 247Sports: ESPN: (81)				
Troy Brown Jr. G/F	Las Vegas, NV	Centennial HS	6 ft 6.5 in (1.99 m)	205 lb (93 kg)	Nov 7, 2016
Troy Brown Jr. G/F	Recruit ratings: Scout: Rivals: 247Sports: ESPN: (93)				
Kenny Wooten; PF	Manteca, CA	Trinity International (NV)	6 ft 8 in (2.03 m)	205 lb (93 kg)	Apr 24, 2017
Kenny Wooten; PF	Recruit ratings: Scout: Rivals: 247Sports: ESPN: (80)				
Overall recruit ranking:
Note: In many cases, Scout, Rivals, 247Sports, On3, and ESPN may conflict in their listings of height and weight.; In these cases, the average was taken. ESPN grades are on a 100-point scale.; Sources: "Oregon 2017 Basketball Commitments". Rivals.; "2017 Oregon Ducks Recruiting Class". ESPN.; "2017 Team Ranking". Rivals.

== Roster ==
2017–18 Oregon Ducks men's basketball team
Players
Coaches

Pos.	#	Name	Height	Weight	Year	Previous school	Hometown
F	0	Troy Brown Jr.	6 ft 7 in (2.01 m)	215 lb (98 kg)	Fr	Centennial HS	Las Vegas, Nevada
F	1	Kenny Wooten	6 ft 9 in (2.06 m)	220 lb (100 kg)	Fr	Trinity Intl (NV)	Manteca, California
G	3	Payton Pritchard	6 ft 2 in (1.88 m)	195 lb (88 kg)	So	West Linn HS	West Linn, Oregon
F	4	M. J. Cage	6 ft 10 in (2.08 m)	225 lb (102 kg)	RS Fr	Mater Dei HS	Santa Ana, California
G	5	Elijah Brown	6 ft 4 in (1.93 m)	200 lb (91 kg)	GS	New Mexico	Orange County, California
G	10	Victor Bailey Jr.	6 ft 3 in (1.91 m)	185 lb (84 kg)	Fr	McNeil HS	Austin, Texas
F	11	Keith Smith	6 ft 7 in (2.01 m)	215 lb (98 kg)	So	Rainier Beach HS	Seattle, Washington
F	13	Paul White	6 ft 9 in (2.06 m)	225 lb (102 kg)	RS Jr	Georgetown	Chicago, Illinois
G	21	Evan Gross (W)	5 ft 10 in (1.78 m)	165 lb (75 kg)	RS Sr	Oak Ridge HS	Sacramento, California
F	22	MiKyle McIntosh	6 ft 7 in (2.01 m)	240 lb (109 kg)	GS	Illinois State	Pickering, Ontario
F	24	Abu Kigab	6 ft 6 in (1.98 m)	215 lb (98 kg)	Fr	Prolific Prep	St. Catharines, Ontario
F	41	Roman Sorkin	6 ft 10 in (2.08 m)	230 lb (104 kg)	Sr	Hof HaSharon HS	Ashdod, Israel
G	54	Will Johnson (W)	6 ft 1 in (1.85 m)	180 lb (82 kg)	Fr	Palisades HS	Pacific Palisades, California

Head coach

- Dana Altman (Eastern New Mexico)

Assistant coach(es)

- Kevin McKenna (Creighton)
- Tony Stubblefield (Omaha)
- Mike Mennenga (Morehead State)

Legend

- (C) Team captain
- (S) Suspended
- (I) Ineligible
- (W) Walk-on
- Injured
- Current redshirt

Roster
Last update: October 6, 2017

== Schedule and results ==
Date time, TV	Rank^{#}	Opponent^{#}	Result	Record	High points	High rebounds	High assists	Site (attendance) city, state
Exhibition
Oct 28, 2017*; 11:00 am		Idaho; Charity Exhibition for Oregon Wildfire Fund	W 81–57	–	20 – Bailey Jr.	6 – 3 tied	5 – Pritchard	Matthew Knight Arena; Eugene, OR
Oct 30, 2017*; 7:00 pm, P12N		Northwest Christian	W 124–72	–	25 – Pritchard	6 – Tied	9 – T. Brown Jr.	Matthew Knight Arena (7,028); Eugene, OR
Non-conference regular season
Nov 10, 2017*; 9:00 pm, P12N		Coppin State	W 70–54	1–0	23 – Sorkin	8 – Pritchard	4 – Tied	Matthew Knight Arena (7,232); Eugene, OR
Nov 13, 2017*; 6:00 pm, P12N		Prairie View A&M	W 100–67	2–0	17 – T. Brown Jr.	8 – Brown	4 – 3 tied	Matthew Knight Arena (6,428); Eugene, OR
Nov 17, 2017*; 8:00 pm, P12N		Alabama State	W 114–56	3–0	19 – Wooten	13 – Wooten	7 – Pritchard	Matthew Knight Arena (8,100); Eugene, OR
Nov 19, 2017*; 6:00 pm, P12N		Ball State	W 95–71	4–0	20 – Pritchard	8 – T. Brown Jr.	8 – Pritchard	Matthew Knight Arena (6,916); Eugene, OR
Nov 23, 2017*; 6:00 pm, ESPNU		vs. UConn; PK80-Phil Knight Invitational Victory quarterfinals	L 63–71	4–1	14 – Prichard	11 – McIntosh	3 – E. Brown	Moda Center (13,439); Portland, OR
Nov 24, 2017*; 6:30 pm, ESPNU		vs. DePaul; PK80-Phil Knight Invitational Victory consolation 2nd round	W 89–79 ^{OT}	5–1	29 – Pritchard	9 – T. Brown Jr.	8 – Pritchard	Veterans Memorial Coliseum (8,853); Portland, OR
Nov 26, 2017*; 10:00 am, ESPN2		vs. Oklahoma; PK80-Phil Knight Invitational Victory 5th place game	L 80–90	5–2	17 – White	8 – T. Brown Jr.	5 – Pritchard	Veterans Memorial Coliseum (5,910); Portland, OR
Dec 1, 2017*; 6:30 pm, P12N		Boise State	L 70–73	5–3	28 – Pritchard	5 – Smith	4 – E. Brown	Matthew Knight Arena (7,688); Eugene, OR
Dec 8, 2017*; 7:00 pm, P12N		Colorado State	W 95–65	6–3	20 – E. Brown	10 – T. Brown Jr.	5 – E. Brown Jr.	Matthew Knight Arena (7,153); Eugene, OR
Dec 11, 2017*; 7:00 pm, P12N		Texas Southern	W 74–68	7–3	16 – Pritchard	12 – T. Brown Jr.	4 – Tied	Matthew Knight Arena (6,249); Eugene, OR
Dec 13, 2017*; 7:00 pm, P12N		Portland State	W 95–84	8–3	22 – E. Brown	10 – T. Brown Jr.	9 – T. Brown Jr.	Matthew Knight Arena (6,905); Eugene, OR
Dec 16, 2017*; 3:00 pm, CBSSN		at Fresno State	W 68–61	9–3	20 – E. Brown	10 – Wooten	2 – E. Brown	Save Mart Center (9,225); Fresno, CA
Dec 20, 2017*; 7:00 pm, P12N		Central Arkansas	W 96–82	10–3	24 – Pritchard	6 – 3 tied	8 – Pritchard	Matthew Knight Arena (6,908); Eugene, OR
Pac-12 regular season
Dec. 29, 2017; 7:00 pm, FS1		Utah	L 56–66	10–4 (0–1)	16 – T. Brown Jr.	6 – T. Brown Jr.	5 – E. Brown	Matthew Knight Arena (9,661); Eugene, OR
Dec. 31, 2017; 7:00 pm, P12N		Colorado	W 77–62	11–4 (1–1)	21 – T. Brown Jr.	7 – Tied	4 – Prichard	Matthew Knight Arena (7,458); Eugene, OR
Jan. 5, 2018; 7:00 pm, FS1		at Oregon State; Civil War	L 64–76	11–5 (1–2)	16 – White	8 – T. Brown Jr.	5 – White	Gill Coliseum (6,482); Corvallis, OR
Jan. 11, 2018; 7:00 pm, FS1		at No. 11 Arizona State	W 76–72	12–5 (2–2)	18 – Tied	13 – McIntosh	6 – Pritchard	Wells Fargo Arena (13,693); Tempe, AZ
Jan. 13, 2018; 11:00 am, ESPN2		at No. 17 Arizona	L 83–90	12–6 (2–3)	25 – E. Brown	7 – McIntosh	7 – Pritchard	McKale Center (14,644); Tucson, AZ
Jan. 18, 2018; 6:00 pm, ESPN2		USC	L 70–75	12–7 (2–4)	18 – Prichard	10 – McIntosh	7 – Prichard	Matthew Knight Arena (9,202); Eugene, OR
Jan. 20, 2018; 7:00 pm, ESPN		UCLA	W 94–91	13–7 (3–4)	25 – Prichard	8 – McIntosh	5 – T. Brown Jr.	Matthew Knight Arena (12,364); Eugene, OR
Jan. 27, 2018; 5:00 pm, P12N		Oregon State; Civil War	W 66–57	14–7 (4–4)	20 – E. Brown	6 – Tied	7 – Prichard	Matthew Knight Arena (12,364); Eugene, OR
Feb. 1, 2018; 6:00 pm, P12N		at California	W 66–53	15–7 (5–4)	16 – T. Brown	11 – McIntosh	4 – Pritchard	Haas Pavilion (7,531); Berkeley, CA
Feb. 3, 2018; 2:00 pm, FOX		at Stanford	L 61–96	15–8 (5–5)	15 – T. Brown	6 – T. Brown	3 – Tied	Maples Pavilion (4,894); Stanford, CA
Feb. 8, 2018; 7:00 pm, FS1		Washington	W 65–40	16–8 (6–5)	21 – T. Brown	9 – McIntosh	8 – Pritchard	Matthew Knight Arena (9,938); Eugene, OR
Feb. 11, 2018; 5:00 pm, ESPNU		Washington State	W 84–57	17–8 (7–5)	19 – Pritchard	10 – T. Brown	10 – Pritchard	Matthew Knight Arena (9,419); Eugene, OR
Feb. 15, 2018; 6:00 pm, ESPN2		at USC	L 70–72	17–9 (7–6)	23 – McIntosh	7 – T. Brown	4 – Pritchard	Galen Center (4,322); Los Angeles, CA
Feb. 17, 2018; 7:15 pm, ESPN		at UCLA	L 78–86 ^{OT}	17–10 (7–7)	23 – Pritchard	9 – McIntosh	7 – T. Brown	Pauley Pavilion (13,001); Los Angeles, CA
Feb. 22, 2018; 8:30 pm, FS1		Arizona State	W 75–68	18–10 (8–7)	19 – E. Brown	7 – E. Brown	6 – Pritchard	Matthew Knight Arena (9,940); Eugene, OR
Feb. 24, 2018; 7:15 pm, ESPN		No. 14 Arizona	W 98–93 ^{OT}	19–10 (9–7)	30 – E. Brown	5 – Tied	8 – Pritchard	Matthew Knight Arena (12,364); Eugene, OR
Mar. 1, 2018; 6:00 pm, ESPN2		at Washington State	L 76–78	19–11 (9–8)	18 – E. Brown	7 – McIntosh	4 – McIntosh	Beasley Coliseum (2,592); Pullman, WA
Mar. 3, 2018; 1:30 pm, P12N		at Washington	W 72–64	20–11 (10–8)	14 – Prichard	7 – McIntosh	6 – T.Brown	Alaska Airlines Arena (9,912); Seattle, WA
Pac-12 Tournament
March 7, 2018; 8:30 pm, P12N	(6)	vs. (11) Washington State; First Round	W 64–62 ^{OT}	21–11	18 – McIntosh	9 – T.Brown	5 – White	T-Mobile Arena (10,458); Paradise, NV
March 8, 2018; 8:45 pm, FS1	(6)	vs. (3) Utah; Quarterfinals	W 68–66	22–11	21 – E.Brown	8 – Wooten	3 – McIntosh	T-Mobile Arena (13,194); Paradise, NV
March 9, 2018; 8:45 pm, FS1	(6)	vs. (2) USC; Semifinals	L 54–74	22–12	21 – McIntosh	5 – Tied	7 – Pritchard	T-Mobile Arena (16,596); Paradise, NV
NIT
March 13, 2018*; 7:00 pm, ESPN3	(3)	(6) Rider; First Round – Notre Dame Bracket	W 99–86	23–12	23 – Tied	10 – Wooten	8 – Pritchard	Matthew Knight Arena (2,327); Eugene, OR
March 18, 2018*; 1:30 pm, ESPN2	(3)	at (2) Marquette; Second Round – Notre Dame Bracket	L 92–101	23–13	25 – McIntosh	4 – Tied	5 – Brown	Al McGuire Center (3,618); Milwaukee, WI
*Non-conference game. ^{#}Rankings from AP Poll. (#) Tournament seedings in parentheses. All times are in Pacific Time.
