= 2017–18 Alabama State Hornets basketball team =

American college basketball season

2017–18 Alabama State Hornets basketball
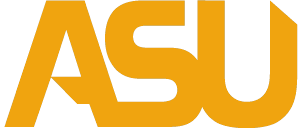
- Conference: Southwestern Athletic Conference
- Record: 8–23 (8–10 SWAC)
- Head coach: Lewis Jackson (13th season)
- Assistant coaches: Anthony Sewell; Steve Rogers; Michael Curry
- Home arena: Dunn–Oliver Acadome

2017–18 SWAC men's basketball standings
	Conf.				Overall
Team	W		L	PCT	W		L	PCT
Grambling State*	13	–	5	.722	17	–	14	.548
Prairie View A&M	12	–	6	.667	16	–	18	.471
Texas Southern †	12	–	6	.667	16	–	20	.444
Arkansas–Pine Bluff	12	–	6	.667	14	–	21	.400
Southern	10	–	8	.556	15	–	18	.455
Jackson State	9	–	9	.500	12	–	20	.375
Alabama State	8	–	10	.444	8	–	23	.258
Alcorn State	7	–	11	.389	11	–	21	.344
Mississippi Valley State	4	–	14	.222	4	–	28	.125
Alabama A&M*	3	–	15	.167	3	–	28	.097
† 2018 SWAC tournament winner *ineligible for postseason due to APR violations

The 2017–18 Alabama State Hornets basketball team represented Alabama State University during the 2017–18 NCAA Division I men's basketball season. The Hornets, led by 13th-year head coach Lewis Jackson, played their home games at the Dunn–Oliver Acadome in Montgomery, Alabama as members of the Southwestern Athletic Conference. They finished the season 8–23, 8–10 in SWAC play to finish in seventh place. Due to Grambling State's ineligibility, they received the No. 6 seed in the SWAC tournament where they lost to Texas Southern in the quarterfinals.

== Previous season ==
The Hornets finished the 2016–17 season 8–23, 6–12 in SWAC play to finish in a tie for eighth place. As the No. 8 seed in the SWAC tournament, they lost to Texas Southern in the quarterfinals.

== Roster ==
2017–18 Alabama State Hornets men's basketball team
Players
Coaches

Pos.	#	Name	Height	Weight	Year	Hometown
G/F	1	Rodney Simeon	6 ft 5 in (1.96 m)	215 lb (98 kg)	Sr	Miami, Florida
G	2	Micah Johnson	6 ft 2 in (1.88 m)	175 lb (79 kg)	Fr	Tifton, Georgia
G	3	Gene Davis	6 ft 1 in (1.85 m)	180 lb (82 kg)	Jr	Birmingham, Alabama
F	4	Demetruis Houston	6 ft 7 in (2.01 m)	190 lb (86 kg)	RS Jr	Montgomery, Alabama
G	5	Tobi Ewuosho	6 ft 5 in (1.96 m)	175 lb (79 kg)	So	Chicago, Illinois
G	10	Jacoby Ross	5 ft 9 in (1.75 m)	165 lb (75 kg)	Fr	New Orleans, Louisiana
G/F	11	Austin Rogers	6 ft 4 in (1.93 m)	180 lb (82 kg)	RS Fr	Montgomery, Alabama
G	12	Reginald Gee	6 ft 3 in (1.91 m)	175 lb (79 kg)	So	Houston, Texas
F	13	Fredens Deneus	6 ft 8 in (2.03 m)	235 lb (107 kg)	Jr	Boston, Massachusetts
F	14	Ed Jones	6 ft 8 in (2.03 m)	205 lb (93 kg)	Jr	Atlanta, Georgia
F	15	Fausto Pichardo	6 ft 8 in (2.03 m)	215 lb (98 kg)	Jr	New York, New York
F/C	21	Marice Wright	6 ft 11 in (2.11 m)	215 lb (98 kg)	Jr	Clarksville, Tennessee
C	24	Branden Johnson	6 ft 8 in (2.03 m)	205 lb (93 kg)	RS So	Garfield, Ohio
G	30	Terrance LeFlore	6 ft 1 in (1.85 m)	170 lb (77 kg)	RS Sr	Wetumpka, Alabama
G	52	Steve Rogers	6 ft 1 in (1.85 m)	160 lb (73 kg)	Sr	Montgomery, Alabama

Head coach

- Lewis Jackson (Alabama State)

Assistant coach(es)

- Anthony Sewell (Troy)
- Steve Rogers (Alabama State)
- Michael Curry (Georgia Southwestern)

Legend

- (C) Team captain
- (S) Suspended
- (I) Ineligible
- (W) Walk-on
- Injured
- Current redshirt

Roster
Last update: January 24, 2018

== Schedule and results ==
Date time, TV	Rank^{#}	Opponent^{#}	Result	Record	Site (attendance) city, state
Exhibition
Oct. 30, 2017*; 7:00 pm		Fort Valley State	W 68–62		Dunn–Oliver Acadome; Montgomery, AL
Nov 3, 2017*; 7:00 pm		Auburn–Montgomery	W 76–73		Dunn–Oliver Acadome; Montgomery, AL
Non-conference regular season
Nov 10, 2017*; 5:30 pm		at Mississippi State	L 68–96	0–1	Humphrey Coliseum (6,811); Starkville, MS
Nov 12, 2017*; 3:05 pm, BTN+		at Iowa	L 58–92	0–2	Carver–Hawkeye Arena (11,637); Iowa City, IA
Nov 14, 2017*; 7:00 pm		at South Dakota State	L 63–94	0–3	Frost Arena (1,887); Brookings, SD
Nov 17, 2017*; 8:00 pm, P12N		at Oregon	L 56–114	0–4	Matthew Knight Arena (8,100); Eugene, OR
Nov 20, 2017*; 7:30 pm, ESPN3		at Chattanooga	L 48–67	0–5	McKenzie Arena (2,332); Chattanooga, TN
Nov 21, 2017*; 5:00 pm		vs. Savannah State	L 97–101	0–6	McKenzie Arena (2,211); Chattanooga, TN
Nov 27, 2017*; 7:00 pm, ESPNU		at No. 11 Cincinnati	L 51–83	0–7	BB&T Arena (7,012); Highland Heights, KY
Nov 30, 2017*; 7:00 pm		at Jacksonville State	L 69–77	0–8	Pete Mathews Coliseum (1,069); Jacksonville, AL
Dec 12, 2017*; 7:00 pm		Tennessee State	L 45–64	0–9	Dunn–Oliver Acadome (362); Montgomery, AL
Dec 16, 2017*; 1:00 pm		Winthrop	L 80–88	0–10	Dunn–Oliver Acadome; Montgomery, AL
Dec 21, 2017*; 2:30 pm		vs. Louisiana Tech; New Orleans Shootout semifinal	L 62–74	0–11	Convocation Center (300); New Orleans, LA
Dec 22, 2017*; 12:00 pm		vs. Liberty; New Orleans Shootout 3rd place game	L 70–87	0–12	Convocation Center (250); New Orleans, LA
SWAC regular season
Jan 1, 2018; 7:45 pm		at Jackson State	L 73–82	0–1 (0–13)	Williams Assembly Center (807); Jackson, MS
Jan 3, 2018; 7:30 pm		at Grambling State	W 74–66	1–13 (1–1)	Fredrick C. Hobdy Assembly Center (325); Grambling, LA
Jan 6, 2018; 3:00 pm		Mississippi Valley State	L 63–64	2–13 (2–1)	Dunn–Oliver Acadome (863); Montgomery, AL
Jan 8, 2018; 6:00 pm		Arkansas–Pine Bluff	L 68–94	2–14 (2–2)	Dunn–Oliver Acadome (562); Montgomery, AL
Jan 13, 2018; 5:00 pm		Alabama A&M	W 70–67	3–14 (3–2)	Dunn–Oliver Acadome (2,780); Montgomery, AL
Jan 20, 2018; 5:30 pm		at Southern	L 61–63	3–15 (3–3)	F. G. Clark Center (1,299); Baton Rouge, LA
Jan 22, 2018; 7:00 pm		at Alcorn State	L 64–81	3–16 (3–4)	Davey Whitney Complex (653); Lorman, MS
Jan 27, 2018; 3:00 pm		Prairie View A&M	L 80–86	3–17 (3–5)	Dunn–Oliver Acadome; Montgomery, AL
Jan 29, 2018; 3:00 pm		Texas Southern	L 82–97	3–18 (3–6)	Dunn–Oliver Acadome (1,237); Montgomery, AL
Feb 3, 2018; 4:00 pm		at Mississippi Valley State	W 89–85 ^{OT}	4–18 (4–6)	Harrison HPER Complex (1,927); Montgomery, AL
Feb 5, 2018; 5:30 pm		at Arkansas–Pine Bluff	W 65–59	5–18 (5–6)	K. L. Johnson Complex (3,120); Pine Bluff, AR
Feb 10, 2018; 3:00 pm		at Alabama A&M	W 69–50	6–18 (6–6)	Elmore Gymnasium (4,400); Normal, AL
Feb 17, 2018; 5:00 pm		Southern	L 67–71	6–19 (6–7)	Dunn–Oliver Acadome; Montgomery, AL
Feb 19, 2018; 8:00 pm, ESPNU		Alcorn State	W 82–62	7–19 (7–7)	Dunn–Oliver Acadome (1,252); Montgomery, AL
Feb 24, 2018; 5:00 pm		at Prairie View A&M	L 74–80	7–20 (7–8)	William J. Nicks Building (6,240); Prairie View, TX
Feb 26, 2018; 7:30 pm		at Texas Southern	L 77–95	7–21 (7–9)	H&PE Arena (1,021); Houston, TX
Mar 1, 2018; 5:30 pm		Jackson State	W 62–60	8–21 (8–9)	Dunn–Oliver Acadome (1,673); Montgomery, AL
Mar 3, 2018; 3:00 pm		Grambling State	L 64–66	8–22 (8–10)	Dunn–Oliver Acadome; Montgomery, AL
SWAC tournament
Mar 6, 2018; 8:00 pm	(6)	vs. (3) Texas Southern; Quarterfinals	L 76–90	8–23	H&PE Arena (2,481); Houston, TX
*Non-conference game. ^{#}Rankings from AP Poll. (#) Tournament seedings in parentheses. All times are in Central.
