= Donnie Marsh =

American basketball coach (born 1956)

Biographical details
- Born: March 21, 1956 (age 70); Atlantic City, New Jersey, U.S.

Playing career
- 1975–1979: Franklin & Marshall

Coaching career (HC unless noted)
- 1980–1987: Franklin & Marshall (assistant)
- 1988–1989: Elizabethtown
- 1989–1993: TCNJ
- 1995–1997: Florida State (assistant)
- 1997–2000: Virginia Tech (assistant)
- 2000–2004: FIU
- 2004–2006: Indiana (assistant)
- 2006–2012: UAB (assistant)
- 2012–2013: Texas Southern (assistant)
- 2013–2015: South Florida (assistant)
- 2015–2017: Texas Southern (assistant)
- 2017–2018: Alabama A&M
- 2018–2021: Florida Gulf Coast (assistant)
- 2021–2024: Detroit Mercy (assistant)

Head coaching record
- Overall: 110–166

Donnie Marsh (born March 21, 1956) is an American men's basketball coach. He is the former head coach at Florida International University and Alabama A&M University. He also served as associate head coach under Mike Davis at Texas Southern, while also having assistant coaching stops at South Florida, UAB, Indiana, Virginia Tech and Florida State. In addition, he served as the head coach of The College of New Jersey from 1989 to 1993 Currently, he is an assistant coach at Florida Gulf Coast.

== Head coaching record ==
Record table
| Season | Team | Overall | Conference | Standing | Postseason |
|---|---|---|---|---|---|
Elizabethtown Blue Jays (Middle Atlantic Conference) (1988–1989)
| 1988–89 | Elizabethtown | 12–13 | N/A | N/A | |
| Elizabethtown: | | 12–13 (.480) | 0–0 (–) | | |
TCNJ Lions (New Jersey Athletic Conference) (1989–1993)
| 1989–90 | TCNJ | 22–6 | 14–4 | 2nd | NCAA Division III First Round |
| 1990–91 | TCNJ | 15–10 | 8–10 | 7th | |
| 1991–92 | TCNJ | 13–12 | 10–8 | 5th | |
| 1992–93 | TCNJ | 14–13 | 11–7 | 4th | |
| TCNJ: | | 64–41 (.610) | 43–29 (.597) | | |
FIU Panthers (Sun Belt Conference) (2000–2004)
| 2000–01 | FIU | 8–21 | 5–11 | 5th (East) | |
| 2001–02 | FIU | 10–20 | 4–10 | 5th (East) | |
| 2002–03 | FIU | 8–21 | 1–13 | 5th (East) | |
| 2003–04 | FIU | 5–22 | 1–13 | 5th (East) | |
| FIU: | | 31–84 (.270) | 11–47 (.190) | | |
Alabama A&M Bulldogs (Southwestern Athletic Conference) (2017–2018)
| 2017–18 | Alabama A&M | 3–28 | 3–15 | 10th | |
| Alabama A&M: | | 3–28 (.097) | 3–15 (.167) | | |
| Total: | | 110–166 (.399) | | | |
