= Morris Scott =

American basketball coach

Current position
- Title: Head coach
- Team: Chattahoochee Valley Pirates
- Conference: Alabama Community College Conference

Biographical details
- Born: Fitzgerald, Georgia, U.S.

Playing career

Basketball
- 1997–2001: Florida A&M

Baseball
- 2000–2002: Florida A&M

Coaching career (HC unless noted)
- 2003–2005: Florida A&M (GA)
- 2005–2006: Chipley HS
- 2006–2007: Northwest Florida State (assistant)
- 2007–2009: Southeastern Louisiana (assistant)
- 2009–2010: Middleton HS
- 2010–2011: Grambling State (assistant)
- 2011–2017: Southern (assistant)
- 2017–2018: Southern (interim HC)
- 2019–2020: Northwestern State (assistant)
- 2020–2024: Louisiana-Monroe (assistant)
- 2024–present: Chattahoochee Valley CC

Head coaching record
- Overall: 15–18 (.455)

Morris Scott is an American basketball coach who is currently the head coach for the Chattahoochee Valley Pirates men's basketball team. Before coaching for Chattahoochee Valley, Scott was the interim head coach of the Southern Jaguars basketball team from 2017 to 2018 following the promotion of head coach Roman Banks to athletic director. Scott's previous position was as an assistant coach for the Northwestern State Demons basketball team and for the Louisiana–Monroe Warhawks men's basketball team.

== College career ==
Morris Scott attended Florida A&M University, where he played both basketball and baseball. While playing basketball at Florida A&M, he helped lead the team to the school's first NCAA Tournament appearance in 1999. Scott was also named to the All-MEAC Tournament team that same year. Scott graduated from Florida A&M with a bachelor's of science.

== Coaching career ==
After graduating from Florida A&M, Scott coached for the basketball team as a graduate assistant (from 2003 to 2005) while pursuing his master's of science. Scott then spent a year as the head coach for Chipley High School basketball in Chipley, Florida, where he led the team to a district championship. In 2006, Scott became an assistant basketball coach for Northwest Florida State College, and followed that position up with a tenure as assistant basketball coach at Southeastern Louisiana University from 2007 to 2009. Scott returned to high school coaching for a year as head coach of the Middleton High School basketball team in Tampa, Florida. Scott then joined Grambling State University as an assistant basketball coach in 2010–11. In the 2011–12 season, Scott joined Southern University as an assistant basketball coach where he would remain for seven years. Before the 2017–18 season, former head coach for the Southern Jaguars basketball Roman Banks was promoted to become athletic director for Southern, and Scott was promoted to interim head coach in his place. That season, Scott led Southern to a 15–18 record. After Southern hired Sean Woods as head coach, Scott left to become the assistant basketball coach at Northwestern State University in 2019. After one year in that capacity, Scott became an assistant basketball coach at the University of Louisiana–Monroe.

== Head coaching record ==
Statistics overview
Season	Team	Overall	Conference	Standing	Postseason
Southern Jaguars (SWAC) (2017–2018)
2017–18	Southern	15–18	10–8	5th	
Manhattan:		15–18 (.455)	10–8 (.556)		
Total:		15–18 (.455)			
National champion Postseason invitational champion Conference regular season champion Conference regular season and conference tournament champion Division regular season champion Division regular season and conference tournament champion Conference tournament champion
