= 2017–18 Grambling State Tigers men's basketball team =

American college basketball season

2017–18 Grambling State Tigers men's basketball

SWAC regular season champions
- Conference: Southwestern Athletic Conference
- Record: 17–14 (13–5 SWAC)
- Head coach: Donte Jackson (1st season)
- Assistant coaches: Winston Hines; Demetrius Moore; Kyle Jones
- Home arena: Fredrick C. Hobdy Assembly Center

2017–18 SWAC men's basketball standings
	Conf.				Overall
Team	W		L	PCT	W		L	PCT
Grambling State*	13	–	5	.722	17	–	14	.548
Prairie View A&M	12	–	6	.667	16	–	18	.471
Texas Southern †	12	–	6	.667	16	–	20	.444
Arkansas–Pine Bluff	12	–	6	.667	14	–	21	.400
Southern	10	–	8	.556	15	–	18	.455
Jackson State	9	–	9	.500	12	–	20	.375
Alabama State	8	–	10	.444	8	–	23	.258
Alcorn State	7	–	11	.389	11	–	21	.344
Mississippi Valley State	4	–	14	.222	4	–	28	.125
Alabama A&M*	3	–	15	.167	3	–	28	.097
† 2018 SWAC tournament winner *ineligible for postseason due to APR violations

The 2017–18 Grambling State Tigers men's basketball team represented Grambling State University during the 2017–18 NCAA Division I men's basketball season. The Tigers, led by first-year head coach Donte Jackson, played their home games at the Fredrick C. Hobdy Assembly Center in Grambling, Louisiana as members of the Southwestern Athletic Conference.

With a win over Alabama State on March 3, 2018, Grambling State clinched the outright SWAC regular season championship, the school's first since 1989. The Tigers also clinched their first winning season since 2005-06. They finished the season 17–14, 13–5 in SWAC play. However, the Tigers were ineligible for postseason play due to APR violations. The team's unexpected success came just five years removed from their rock bottom 0-28 season.

== Previous season ==
The Tigers finished the 2016–17 season 16–17, 10–8 in SWAC play to finish in a four-way tie for third place. As the 5-seed in the SWAC tournament they defeated Prairie View A&M before losing in the semifinals to Texas Southern.

On March 22, 2017, it was announced that head coach Shawn Walker's contract would not be renewed. He finished at Grambling State with a three-year record of 25–68. On May 12, Grambling State hired Donte Jackson from Stillman of the NAIA as new head coach.

== Roster ==
2017–18 Grambling State Tigers men's basketball team
Players
Coaches

Pos.	#	Name	Height	Weight	Year	Hometown
G	0	Shaq Athie	6 ft 4 in (1.93 m)	185 lb (84 kg)	Jr	Cincinnati, Ohio
G	1	Ivy Smith Jr.	6 ft 0 in (1.83 m)	160 lb (73 kg)	So	Tacoma, Washington
G	2	Nigel Ribeiro	6 ft 0 in (1.83 m)	170 lb (77 kg)	Jr	Chesapeake, Virginia
G	3	Kareem Wright	6 ft 3 in (1.91 m)	180 lb (82 kg)	So	Nashville, Tennessee
G	4	Anthony Gaston	6 ft 5 in (1.96 m)	190 lb (86 kg)	So	Richmond, Virginia
G	5	Shirmane Thomas	6 ft 3 in (1.91 m)	195 lb (88 kg)	Sr	Homer, Louisiana
G	10	Drake Wilks	6 ft 0 in (1.83 m)	175 lb (79 kg)	Sr	Baltimore, Maryland
F	11	Axel Mpoyo	6 ft 8 in (2.03 m)	215 lb (98 kg)	Jr	Meridian, Idaho
G/F	12	Bobby Jackson	6 ft 6 in (1.98 m)	185 lb (84 kg)	Jr	Atlanta, Georgia
G	20	Charles Simmons	6 ft 5 in (1.96 m)	175 lb (79 kg)	So	Ahoskie, North Carolina
F	21	Zavier Peart	6 ft 10 in (2.08 m)	250 lb (113 kg)	Sr	Miami, Florida
G	22	Prince Moss	6 ft 6 in (1.98 m)	180 lb (82 kg)	So	Bessemer, Alabama
G	23	Marcel Thompson	6 ft 3 in (1.91 m)	190 lb (86 kg)	Fr	Baltimore, Maryland
G/F	23	Diing Diing Wol	6 ft 8 in (2.03 m)	220 lb (100 kg)	Jr	Baytown, Texas
G/F	24	Diontae Jones	6 ft 6 in (1.98 m)	215 lb (98 kg)	Sr	Las Vegas, Nevada
F	32	Devante Jackson	6 ft 9 in (2.06 m)	200 lb (91 kg)	So	Milwaukee, Wisconsin
F	33	Jason Perry-Murray	6 ft 9 in (2.06 m)	220 lb (100 kg)	Fr	Harlem, New York
G	34	Lasani Johnson	6 ft 3 in (1.91 m)	180 lb (82 kg)	Jr	Dallas, Texas
C	40	Travon Bunch	7 ft 0 in (2.13 m)	230 lb (104 kg)	So	Racine, Wisconsin

Head coach

- Donte Jackson (Central State)

Assistant coach(es)

- Winston Hines (Stillman)
- Demetrius Moore (Stillman)
- Kyle Jones (Arkansas–Pine Bluff)

Legend

- (C) Team captain
- (S) Suspended
- (I) Ineligible
- (W) Walk-on
- Injured
- Current redshirt

Roster
Last update: January 25, 2018

== Schedule and results ==
Date time, TV	Opponent	Result	Record	Site (attendance) city, state
Non-conference regular season
Nov 10, 2017*; 6:00 pm, MASN	at VCU	L 65–94	0–1	Siegel Center (7,637); Richmond, VA
Nov 16, 2017*; 7:00 pm, BTN+	at Iowa	L 74–85	0–2	Carver–Hawkeye Arena (10,540); Iowa City, IA
Nov 18, 2017*; 7:00 pm	at South Dakota	L 55–84	0–3	Sanford Coyote Sports Center (2,054); Vermillion, SD
Nov 21, 2017*; 6:00 pm	at Bethune–Cookman; Ramblin' Wreck Showcase	L 78–87	0–4	Moore Gymnasium (616); Daytona Beach, FL
Nov 25, 2017*; 7:00 pm	at Texas–Rio Grande Valley; Ramblin' Wreck Showcase	W 82–76	1–4	UTRGV Fieldhouse (478); Edinburg, TX
Nov 27, 2017*; 7:00 pm	at North Texas; Ramblin' Wreck Showcase	L 77–82	1–5	The Super Pit (1,513); Denton, TX
Dec 1, 2017*; 6:30 pm	at Georgia Tech; Ramblin' Wreck Showcase	W 64–63	2–5	McCamish Pavilion (4,925); Atlanta, GA
Dec 4, 2017*; 7:00 pm	Tougaloo	W 111–95	3–5	Hobdy Center (510); Grambling, LA
Dec 9, 2017*; 8:00 pm	at Grand Canyon	L 53–87	3–6	GCU Arena (6,289); Phoenix, AZ
Dec 12, 2017*; 7:00 pm	at Louisiana–Monroe	L 57–59	3–7	Fant–Ewing Coliseum (1,391); Monroe, LA
Dec 16, 2017*; 2:00 pm	at Southeastern Louisiana	W 68–67	4–7	University Center (425); Hammond, LA
Dec 21, 2017*; 6:00 pm	at East Carolina	L 68–76	4–8	Williams Arena (3,302); Greenville, NC
Dec 28, 2017*; 9:00 pm	at Seattle	L 63–93	4–9	KeyArena (999); Seattle, WA
SWAC regular season
Jan 1, 2018; 2:00 pm	Alabama A&M	L 64–71	4–10 (0–1)	Fredrick C. Hobdy Assembly Center (231); Grambiling, LA
Jan 3, 2018; 7:30 pm	Alabama State	L 66–74	4–11 (0–2)	Fredrick C. Hobdy Assembly Center (325); Grambiling, LA
Jan 6, 2018; 5:30 pm	at Southern	L 69–80	4–12 (0–3)	F. G. Clark Center (2,108); Baton Rouge, LA
Jan 8, 2018; 7:00 pm	at Alcorn State	W 72–61	5–12 (1–3)	Davey Whitney Complex (744); Lorman, MS
Jan 13, 2018; 5:30 pm	Prairie View A&M	W 80–71	6–12 (2–3)	Fredrick C. Hobdy Assembly Center (715); Grambiling, LA
Jan 15, 2018; 7:30 pm	Texas Southern	W 79–78	7–12 (3–3)	Fredrick C. Hobdy Assembly Center (1,243); Grambiling, LA
Jan 20, 2018; 5:30 pm	at Jackson State	W 72–45	8–12 (4–3)	Williams Assembly Center (4,309); Jackson, MS
Jan 27, 2018; 5:30 pm	at Arkansas–Pine Bluff	W 69–68	9–12 (5–3)	K. L. Johnson Complex (5,060); Pine Bluff, AR
Jan 29, 2018; 7:30 pm	at Mississippi Valley State	W 92–89 ^{OT}	10–12 (6–3)	Harrison HPER Complex (2,810); Itta Bena, MS
Feb 3, 2018; 5:30 pm	Southern	W 69–68	11–12 (7–3)	Fredrick C. Hobdy Assembly Center (3,875); Grambling, LA
Feb 5, 2018; 7:30 pm	Alcorn State	W 81–72	12–12 (8–3)	Fredrick C. Hobdy Assembly Center (1,160); Grambling, LA
Feb 10, 2018; 5:00 pm	at Prairie View A&M	W 90–85	13–12 (9–3)	William J. Nicks Building (472); Prairie View, TX
Feb 12, 2018; 7:30 pm	at Texas Southern	W 78–55	14–12 (10–3)	H&PE Arena (3,127); Houston, TX
Feb 17, 2018; 7:30 pm	Jackson State	W 71–64	15–12 (11–3)	Fredrick C. Hobdy Assembly Center (1,207); Grambling, LA
Feb 24, 2018; 5:30 pm	Arkansas–Pine Bluff	L 66–75	15–13 (11–4)	Fredrick C. Hobdy Assembly Center (2,700); Grambiling, LA
Feb 26, 2018; 7:30 pm	Mississippi Valley State	L 74–79	15–14 (11–5)	Fredrick C. Hobdy Assembly Center (1,431); Grambiling, LA
Mar 1, 2018; 7:30 pm	at Alabama A&M	W 84–74 ^{OT}	16–14 (12–5)	Elmore Gymnasium; Normal, AL
Mar 3, 2018; 3:00 pm	at Alabama State	W 66–64	17–14 (13–5)	Dunn–Oliver Acadome; Montgomery, AL
*Non-conference game. ^{#}Rankings from AP Poll. (#) Tournament seedings in parentheses. All times are in Central Time.
