= 2017–18 Mississippi Valley State Delta Devils basketball team =

American college basketball season

2017–18 Mississippi Valley State Delta Devils basketball
- Conference: Southwestern Athletic Conference
- Record: 4–28 (4–14 SWAC)
- Head coach: Andre Payne (4th season)
- Assistant coaches: Eric Strothers; Adaiah Curry; Jaquay Walls
- Home arena: Harrison HPER Complex

2017–18 SWAC men's basketball standings
	Conf.				Overall
Team	W		L	PCT	W		L	PCT
Grambling State*	13	–	5	.722	17	–	14	.548
Prairie View A&M	12	–	6	.667	16	–	18	.471
Texas Southern †	12	–	6	.667	16	–	20	.444
Arkansas–Pine Bluff	12	–	6	.667	14	–	21	.400
Southern	10	–	8	.556	15	–	18	.455
Jackson State	9	–	9	.500	12	–	20	.375
Alabama State	8	–	10	.444	8	–	23	.258
Alcorn State	7	–	11	.389	11	–	21	.344
Mississippi Valley State	4	–	14	.222	4	–	28	.125
Alabama A&M*	3	–	15	.167	3	–	28	.097
† 2018 SWAC tournament winner *ineligible for postseason due to APR violations

The 2017–18 Mississippi Valley State Delta Devils basketball team represented Mississippi Valley State University in the 2017–18 NCAA Division I men's basketball season. The Delta Devils, led by fourth-year head coach Andre Payne, played their home games at the Harrison HPER Complex in Itta Bena, Mississippi as members of the Southwestern Athletic Conference. They finished the season 4–28, 4–14 in SWAC play to finish in ninth place. Due to the ineligibility of Grambling State, the Delta Devils received the No. 8 seed in the SWAC tournament and lost to Arkansas–Pine Bluff in the quarterfinals.

== Previous season ==
The Delta Devils finished the 2016–17 season 7–25, 7–11 in SWAC play to finish in seventh place. In the SWAC tournament, they lost to Alcorn State in the quarterfinals.

== Roster ==
2017–18 Mississippi Valley State Delta Devils men's basketball team
Players
Coaches

Pos.	#	Name	Height	Weight	Year	Hometown
G	0	Jeffery Lewis	6 ft 5 in (1.96 m)	200 lb (91 kg)	Fr	Madison, WI
F	1	Dante Scott	6 ft 4 in (1.93 m)	220 lb (100 kg)	Jr	Miami, Fl
G	3	Jordan Evans	6 ft 2 in (1.88 m)	175 lb (79 kg)	Jr	Waco, TX
G	5	Tereke Eckwood	6 ft 2 in (1.88 m)	175 lb (79 kg)	Jr	Fayetteville, AR
C	10	Emmanuel Ejeh	6 ft 8 in (2.03 m)	220 lb (100 kg)	Jr	Abuja, Nigeria
G	11	Kylan Phillips	5 ft 11 in (1.8 m)	164 lb (74 kg)	Jr	Memphis, TN
F	12	Lorenzo Hunt	6 ft 4 in (1.93 m)	186 lb (84 kg)	So	Memphis, TN
F	13	Marcus Roberts	6 ft 6 in (1.98 m)	195 lb (88 kg)	Jr	Jackson, MS
F	15	Gemaal Davis	6 ft 4 in (1.93 m)	178 lb (81 kg)	Jr	Queens, NY
F	20	Davere Creighton	6 ft 6 in (1.98 m)	263 lb (119 kg)	Jr	Brooklyn, NY
F	21	Arinze Anakwenze	6 ft 6 in (1.98 m)	195 lb (88 kg)	Fr	Los Angeles, CA
G	22	Nate Nahirny	6 ft 2 in (1.88 m)	182 lb (83 kg)	Jr	Houston, TX
F	23	LaCurtis Allen	6 ft 4 in (1.93 m)	185 lb (84 kg)	Sr	Duck Hill, MS
G	24	Henry Taylor	6 ft 4 in (1.93 m)	173 lb (78 kg)	Fr	Gary, IN
G	25	Demontavious Davis	6 ft 0 in (1.83 m)	163 lb (74 kg)	Fr	Jackson, MS
C	32	Kaleb Allison	6 ft 7 in (2.01 m)	275 lb (125 kg)	Fr	Greenville, MS
F	33	Jamal Watson	6 ft 9 in (2.06 m)	210 lb (95 kg)	Sr	Long Beach, CA

Head coach

- Andre Payne

Assistant coach(es)

- Eric Strothers
- Adaiah Curry
- Jaquay Wslls

Legend

- (C) Team captain
- (S) Suspended
- (I) Ineligible
- (W) Walk-on
- Injured
- Current redshirt

Roster
Last update: January 24, 2018

== Schedule and results ==
Date time, TV	Rank^{#}	Opponent^{#}	Result	Record	Site (attendance) city, state
Non-conference regular season
Nov 11, 2017*; 8:00 pm, BYUtv		at BYU	L 61–91	0–1	Marriott Center (14,019); Provo, UT
Nov 13, 2017*; 8:00 pm, P12N		at Utah	L 51–91	0–2	Huntsman Center (9,690); Salt Lake City, UT
Nov 15, 2017*; 8:00 pm		at Utah State	L 47–83	0–3	Smith Spectrum (7,244); Logan, UT
Nov 19, 2017*; 2:00 pm, ESPN3		at Kent State	L 67–80	0–4	MAC Center (2,005); Kent, OH
Nov 21, 2017*; 7:00 pm, ESPN3		at Loyola–Chicago	L 50–63	0–5	Joseph J. Gentile Arena (1,133); Chicago, IL
Nov 25, 2017*; 1:00 pm		vs. Southeastern Louisiana; Savannah Invitational	L 59–73	0–6	Pete Hanna Center (137); Homewood, AL
Nov 26, 2017*; 2:00 pm, ESPN3		at Samford; Savannah Invitational	L 70–83	0–7	Pete Hanna Center (517); Homewood, AL
Dec 3, 2017*; 2:00 pm, FSOK+		at Oklahoma State	L 62–83	0–8	Gallagher-Iba Arena (4,564); Stillwater, OK
Dec 13, 2017*; 6:00 pm		at Duquesne	L 49–73	0–9	Palumbo Center (1,175); Pittsburgh, Pa
Dec 16, 2017*; 1:00 pm, ESPN3		at Akron	L 63–81	0–10	Rhodes Arena (2,155); Akron, OH
Dec 18, 2017*; 8:00 pm, ESPN3		at Grand Canyon	L 38–71	0–11	GCU Arena (6,464); Phoenix, AZ
Dec 20, 2017*; 10:00 pm		at UNLV	L 63–95	0–12	Thomas & Mack Center (9,128); Paradise, NV
Dec 23, 2017*; 2:00 pm		at UAB	L 57–74	0–13	Bartow Arena (2,783); Birmingham, AL
SWAC regular season
Jan 1, 2018; 4:00 pm		Arkansas–Pine Bluff	L 71–80	0–14 (0–1)	Harrison HPER Complex (2,087); Itta Bena, MS
Jan 6, 2018; 3:00 pm		at Alabama State	L 46–63	0–15 (0–2)	Dunn–Oliver Acadome (863); Montgomery, AL
Jan 8, 2018; 7:30 pm		at Alabama A&M	L 55–65	0–16 (0–3)	Elmore Gymnasium (858); Normal, AL
Jan 13, 2018; 4:00 pm		Alcorn State	L 63–77	0–17 (0–4)	Harrison HPER Complex (3,287); Itta Bena, MS
Jan 15, 2018; 7:30 pm		Southern	L 70–78 ^{OT}	0–18 (0–5)	Harrison HPER Complex (2,876); Itta Bena, MS
Jan 20, 2018; 7:30 pm		at Texas Southern	L 77–91	0–19 (0–6)	H&PE Arena (2,485); Houston, TX
Jan 22, 2018; 7:30 pm		at Prairie View A&M	L 77–93	0–20 (0–7)	William J. Nicks Building (1,304); Prairie View, TX
Jan 27, 2018; 4:00 pm		Jackson State	W 72–67	1–20 (1–7)	Harrison HPER Complex (4,397); Itta Bena, MS
Jan 29, 2018; 7:30 pm		Grambling State	L 89–92 ^{OT}	1–21 (1–8)	Harrison HPER Complex (2,810); Itta Bena, MS
Feb 3, 2018; 4:00 pm		Alabama State	L 85–89 ^{OT}	1–22 (1–9)	Harrison HPER Complex (1,927); Itta Bena, MS
Feb 5, 2018; 7:30 pm		Alabama A&M	W 77–67	2–22 (2–9)	Harrison HPER Complex (1,198); Itta Bena, MS
Feb 10, 2018; 5:30 pm		at Alcorn State	L 90–94 ^{OT}	2–23 (2–10)	Davey Whitney Complex (588); Lorman, MS
Feb 12, 2018; 7:30 pm		at Southern	L 51–55	2–24 (2–11)	F. G. Clark Center (1,005); Baton Rouge, LA
Feb 17, 2018; 4:00 pm		Texas Southern	L 71–72	2–25 (2–12)	Harrison HPER Complex (1,515); Itta Bena, MS
Feb 19, 2018; 7:30 pm		Prairie View A&M	W 76–71	3–25 (3–12)	Harrison HPER Complex (992); Itta Bena, MS
Feb 24, 2018; 5:30 pm		at Jackson State	L 59–60	3–26 (3–13)	Williams Assembly Center; Jackson, MS
Feb 26, 2018; 7:30 pm		at Grambling State	W 79–74	4–26 (4–13)	Fredrick C. Hobdy Assembly Center (1,431); Grambling, LA
Mar 1, 2018; 7:30 pm		at Arkansas–Pine Bluff	L 57–94	4–27 (4–14)	K. L. Johnson Complex (2,581); Pine Bluff, AR
SWAC tournament
Mar 6, 2018; 7:30 pm	(8)	at (1) Arkansas–Pine Bluff; Quarterfinals	L 73–77	4–28	K. L. Johnson Complex (5,305); Pine Bluff, AR
*Non-conference game. ^{#}Rankings from AP Poll. (#) Tournament seedings in parentheses. All times are in Central Time.
