= Delmar Fieldhouse =

Arena in Houston, Texas, U.S.

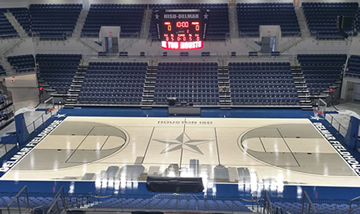
- Houston Independent School District's Delmar Fieldhouse Arena
- Interactive map of Delmar Fieldhouse
- Location: 2020 Mangum Road; Houston, Texas 77092
- Coordinates: 29°48′10″N 95°27′25″W
- Owner: Houston Independent School District
- Capacity: 5,000

Construction
- Opened: 1958
- Closed: September 24, 2013
- Reopened: February 10, 2017
- Demolished: 2014
- Architects: 1958 – Milton McGinty; 2017 – PBK

Tenants
- Houston Cougars men's basketball (NCAA) (1966-1969); Texas Southern Tigers women's basketball (NCAA) (2008)

The James M. Delmar Fieldhouse is a 5,000-seat multi-purpose arena located in Houston, Texas. It is one of several Houston Independent School District’s athletics facilities.

The $35.2 million facility hosts basketball and volleyball games and tournaments, as well as graduation ceremonies and other special events. The maple court floor is removable and expandable, providing use for both the 84 feet required for high school games and the 94 feet required for NCAA play. The court flooring features a star representing the HISD logo and an image of the Houston skyline. Lower level seating is retractable, allowing for additional floor space, if needed. The entrance to the arena also showcases a portion of the center court floor from the original fieldhouse

The entire area including the fieldhouse, stadium, softball and baseball fields are referred to as the Delmar-Tusa Sports Complex.

== History ==
Delmar Fieldhouse was the home court of the Houston Cougars men's basketball team, featuring Elvin Hayes, during the 1960s. It hosted a Midwest regional quarterfinal game between the Cougars and the Marquette Warriors in 1961, the first NCAA men's basketball tournament game held in the city and second in the state of Texas, after the 1957 tournament, which held the Midwest Regional at the SMU Coliseum in Dallas.

In 2007, the WNBA's Houston Comets and Connecticut Sun played a pre-season game at Delmar Fieldhouse.

In 2008, it served as the home court for the Texas Southern University Tigers women's basketball team.

In 2017 Delmar Fieldhouse became a distribution center for the Hurricane Harvey flooding crisis in Houston.

In the new facility, Delmar hosted the 2018 Southwestern Athletic Conference men’s and women’s post-season basketball tournament.

== See also ==
- Delmar Stadium
