= 2016–17 Alabama State Hornets basketball team =

American college basketball season

2016–17 Alabama State Hornets basketball
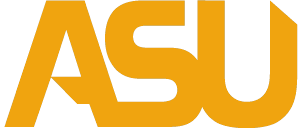
- Conference: Southwestern Athletic Conference
- Record: 8–23 (6–12 SWAC)
- Head coach: Lewis Jackson (12th season)
- Assistant coaches: Anthony Sewell; Steve Rogers; Michael Curry
- Home arena: Dunn–Oliver Acadome

2016–17 SWAC men's basketball standings
	Conf.				Overall
Team	W		L	PCT	W		L	PCT
Texas Southern †	16	–	2	.889	23	–	12	.657
Alcorn State*	13	–	5	.722	18	–	14	.563
Grambling State	10	–	8	.556	16	–	17	.485
Jackson State	10	–	8	.556	14	–	18	.438
Southern	10	–	8	.556	15	–	18	.455
Prairie View A&M	10	–	8	.556	13	–	20	.394
Mississippi Valley State	7	–	11	.389	7	–	25	.219
Alabama State	6	–	12	.333	8	–	23	.258
Arkansas–Pine Bluff	6	–	12	.333	7	–	25	.219
Alabama A&M	2	–	16	.111	2	–	27	.069
† 2017 SWAC tournament winner *ineligible for postseason due to APR violations

The 2016–17 Alabama State Hornets basketball team represented Alabama State University during the 2016–17 NCAA Division I men's basketball season. The Hornets, led by 12th-year head coach Lewis Jackson, played their home games at the Dunn–Oliver Acadome in Montgomery, Alabama as members of the Southwestern Athletic Conference. They finished the season 8–23, 6–12 in SWAC play to finish in a tie for eighth place. As the No. 8 seed in the SWAC tournament, they lost to Texas Southern in the quarterfinals.

== Previous season ==
The Hornets finished the 2015–16 season 14–17, 9–9 in SWAC play to finish in fifth place. They lost to Southern in the quarterfinals of the SWAC tournament.

== Roster ==
2016–17 Alabama State Hornets men's basketball team
Players
Coaches

Pos.	#	Name	Height	Weight	Year	Hometown
F/C	00	Amir Warnock	6 ft 9 in (2.06 m)	245 lb (111 kg)	Jr	Atlanta, Georgia
G/F	1	Rodney Simeon	6 ft 5 in (1.96 m)	215 lb (98 kg)	Jr	Miami, Florida
F	2	Corvon Butler	6 ft 5 in (1.96 m)	225 lb (102 kg)	Sr	Indianapolis, Indiana
G	3	Torloft Thomas	6 ft 4 in (1.93 m)	190 lb (86 kg)	Sr	Montgomery, Alabama
F	4	Demetruis Houston	6 ft 7 in (2.01 m)	190 lb (86 kg)	Jr	Montgomery, Alabama
G	5	Mehdy Ngouama	6 ft 2 in (1.88 m)	175 lb (79 kg)	Jr	Paris, France
G/F	11	Austin Rogers	6 ft 4 in (1.93 m)	180 lb (82 kg)	Fr	Montgomery, Alabama
G	12	Reginald Gee	6 ft 3 in (1.91 m)	175 lb (79 kg)	Fr	Montgomery, Alabama
G	13	Joseff Smith	6 ft 2 in (1.88 m)	175 lb (79 kg)	So	Savannah, Georgia
F	14	Tony Armstrong	6 ft 6 in (1.98 m)	205 lb (93 kg)	Sr	Montgomery, Alabama
F	20	Glenn Hollaway	6 ft 10 in (2.08 m)	195 lb (88 kg)	Jr	Douglasville, Georgia
G	21	Devante Pope	6 ft 2 in (1.88 m)	175 lb (79 kg)	Jr	Pensacola, Florida
C	24	Branden Johnson	6 ft 8 in (2.03 m)	205 lb (93 kg)	RS Fr	Garfield, Ohio
F	25	Mikel Tyson	6 ft 6 in (1.98 m)	215 lb (98 kg)	So	Detroit, Michigan
G	30	Terrance LeFlore	6 ft 1 in (1.85 m)	170 lb (77 kg)	RS Jr	Wetumpka, Alabama
C	31	Artis Cleveland	7 ft 0 in (2.13 m)	245 lb (111 kg)	Jr	Detroit, Michigan
G	52	Steve Rogers	6 ft 1 in (1.85 m)	160 lb (73 kg)	Jr	Montgomery, Alabama

Head coach

- Lewis Jackson (Alabama State)

Assistant coach(es)

- Anthony Sewell (Troy)
- Steve Rogers (Alabama State)
- Michael Curry (Georgia Southwestern)

Legend

- (C) Team captain
- (S) Suspended
- (I) Ineligible
- (W) Walk-on
- Injured
- Current redshirt

Roster

== Schedule and results ==
Date time, TV	Rank^{#}	Opponent^{#}	Result	Record	Site (attendance) city, state
Exhibition
11/01/2016*; 7:00 pm		Auburn–Montgomery	W 56–50		Dunn–Oliver Acadome; Montgomery, AL
11/07/2016*; 7:00 pm		Huntingdon	W 89–61		Dunn–Oliver Acadome (1,000); Montgomery, AL
Non-conference regular season
11/12/2016*; 7:00 pm		at WKU	L 66–79	0–1	E. A. Diddle Arena (4,149); Bowling Green, KY
11/14/2016*; 8:00 pm, FSS		at TCU	L 62–96	0–2	Schollmaier Arena (5,671); Fort Worth, TX
11/16/2016*; 6:30 pm		at Louisiana Tech	L 56–87	0–3	Thomas Assembly Center (3,016); Ruston, LA
11/22/2016*; 6:00 pm, ESPN3		at Kennesaw State	L 72–79	0–4	KSU Convocation Center (937); Kennesaw, GA
11/25/2016*; 02:30 pm		vs. Northern Arizona; Global Sports Classic	L 57–71	0–5	Thomas & Mack Center; Paradise, NV
11/26/2016*; 12:00 pm		vs. Cal State Fullerton; Global Sports Classic	W 76–67 ^{OT}	1–5	Thomas & Mack Center; Paradise, NV
11/29/2016*; 7:00 pm		Jacksonville State	L 69–72	1–6	Dunn–Oliver Acadome (1,259); Montgomery, AL
12/04/2016*; 5:15 pm		at Troy	L 65–83	1–7	Trojan Arena (972); Troy, AL
12/12/2016*; 7:00 pm		at San Diego State	L 41–73	1–8	Viejas Arena (12,414); San Diego, CA
12/14/2016*; 7:30 pm, OVC		at Tennessee State	L 46–68	1–9	Gentry Complex (760); Nashville, TN
12/22/2016*; 7:30 pm		at Ball State	L 48–73	1–10	Worthen Arena (2,543); Muncie, IN
12/29/2016*; 7:00 pm		Fort Valley State	W 75–68	2–10	Dunn–Oliver Acadome (589); Montgomery, AL
SWAC regular season
01/02/2017; 7:30 pm		Grambling State	W 73–69	3–10 (1–0)	Dunn–Oliver Acadome (293); Montgomery, AL
01/04/2017; 7:30 pm		Jackson State	L 60–63	3–11 (1–1)	Dunn–Oliver Acadome (1,059); Montgomery, AL
01/07/2017; 5:00 pm		at Arkansas–Pine Bluff	L 63–71	3–12 (1–2)	K. L. Johnson Complex (650); Pine Bluff, AR
01/09/2017; 7:30 pm		at Mississippi Valley State	L 70–73	3–13 (1–3)	Harrison HPER Complex (2,201); Itta Bena, MS
01/14/2017; 5:00 pm		at Alabama A&M	W 57–55	4–13 (2–3)	Elmore Gymnasium (3,320); Huntsville, AL
01/21/2017; 5:00 pm		Alcorn State	L 71–78	4–14 (2–4)	Dunn–Oliver Acadome (1,256); Montgomery, AL
01/23/2017; 7:30 pm		Southern	W 79–65	5–14 (3–4)	Dunn–Oliver Acadome (1,872); Montgomery, AL
01/28/2017; 7:30 pm		at Texas Southern	L 68–70	5–15 (3–5)	Health and Physical Education Arena (1,022); Houston, TX
01/30/2017; 7:30 pm		at Prairie View A&M	L 52–72	5–16 (3–6)	William J. Nicks Building (1,005); Prairie View, TX
02/04/2017; 5:00 pm		Arkansas–Pine Bluff	W 77–65	6–16 (4–6)	Dunn–Oliver Acadome (1,343); Montgomery, AL
02/06/2017; 7:30 pm		Mississippi Valley State	W 71–66	7–16 (5–6)	Dunn–Oliver Acadome (1,263); Montgomery, AL
02/11/2017; 5:00 pm		Alabama A&M	W 97–89 ^{3OT}	8–16 (6–6)	Dunn–Oliver Acadome (6,285); Montgomery, AL
02/18/2017; 5:00 pm		at Alcorn State	L 67–75	8–17 (6–7)	Davey Whitney Complex (656); Lorman, MS
02/20/2017; 7:30 pm		at Southern	L 73–79	8–18 (6–8)	F. G. Clark Center (899); Baton Rouge, LA
02/25/2017; 5:00 pm		Texas Southern	L 73–86	8–19 (6–9)	Dunn–Oliver Acadome (2,997); Montgomery, AL
02/27/2017; 7:30 pm		Prairie View A&M	L 58–77	8–20 (6–10)	Dunn–Oliver Acadome (1,632); Montgomery, AL
03/02/2017; 7:30 pm		at Grambling State	L 69–82	8–21 (6–11)	Fredrick C. Hobdy Assembly Center (373); Grambling, LA
03/04/2017; 7:30 pm		at Jackson State	L 59–65	8–22 (6–12)	Williams Assembly Center; Jackson, MS
SWAC tournament
03/07/2017; 7:30 pm	(8)	at (1) Texas Southern; Quarterfinals	L 72–87	8–23	Health and Physical Education Arena (3,487); Houston, TX
*Non-conference game. ^{#}Rankings from AP Poll. (#) Tournament seedings in parentheses. All times are in Central.
