= 2016–17 Rice Owls men's basketball team =

American college basketball season

2016–17 Rice Owls men's basketball

CBI, Quarterfinals
- Conference: Conference USA
- Record: 23–12 (11–7 C-USA)
- Head coach: Mike Rhoades (3rd season)
- Assistant coaches: Scott Pera; J.D. Byers; Brent Scott
- Home arena: Tudor Fieldhouse

2016–17 Conference USA men's basketball standings
	Conf.				Overall
Team	W		L	PCT	W		L	PCT
Middle Tennessee †	17	–	1	.944	31	–	5	.861
Louisiana Tech	14	–	4	.778	23	–	10	.697
Old Dominion	12	–	6	.667	19	–	12	.613
UTEP	12	–	6	.667	15	–	17	.469
Rice	11	–	7	.611	23	–	12	.657
Marshall	10	–	8	.556	20	–	15	.571
UAB	9	–	9	.500	17	–	16	.515
Western Kentucky	9	–	9	.500	15	–	17	.469
UTSA	8	–	10	.444	14	–	19	.424
Charlotte	7	–	11	.389	13	–	17	.433
Florida Atlantic	6	–	12	.333	10	–	20	.333
Southern Miss	6	–	12	.333	9	–	22	.290
FIU	3	–	15	.167	7	–	24	.226
North Texas	2	–	16	.111	8	–	22	.267
† 2017 C-USA Tournament winner

The 2016–17 Rice Owls men's basketball team represented Rice University during the 2016–17 NCAA Division I men's basketball season. The Owls, led by third-year head coach Mike Rhoades, played their home games at Tudor Fieldhouse in Houston, Texas as members of Conference USA. They finished the season 23–12, 11–7 in C-USA play to finish in fifth place. They defeated Southern Miss in the first round of the C-USA tournament before losing in the quarterfinals to UTEP. They received an invitation to the College Basketball Invitational where they defeated San Francisco in the first round before losing in the quarterfinals to Utah Valley.

On March 21, 2017, head coach Mike Rhoades resigned to become the head coach at VCU. He finished at Rice with a three-year record of 47–52. On March 23, the school promoted assistant coach Scott Pera to head coach.

== Previous season ==
The Owls finished the 2015–16 season 12–20, 7–11 in C-USA play to finish in a three-way tie for ninth place. They lost in the second round of the C-USA tournament to Charlotte.

== Preseason ==
The Owls were picked to finish in ninth place in the preseason Conference USA poll. Marcus Evans was selected to the preseason All-Conference USA team.

== Departures ==
Name	Number	Pos.	Height	Weight	Year	Hometown	Notes
Max Guercy	1	G	5'9"	170	Senior	Arleta, CA	Graduated
Oliver Xu	30	G	6'2"	170	Sophomore	Hong Kong	Walk-on; didn't return
Amir Smith	32	F	6'6"	200	Freshman	Missouri City, TX	Transferred to State Fair Community College
Nate Pollard	45	C	7'1"	220	Sophomore	Bountiful, UT	Transferred to Chaminade

== Recruiting class of 2016 ==
College recruiting
Name	Hometown	School	Height	Weight	Commit date
Ako Adams #55 PG	Arlington, VA	Bishop O'Connell High School	6 ft 2 in (1.88 m)	160 lb (73 kg)	Sep 5, 2015
Ako Adams #55 PG	Recruit ratings: Scout: Rivals: 247Sports: (3)				
Tim Harrison #66 PF	El Cajon, CA	Francis Parker High School	6 ft 7 in (2.01 m)	170 lb (77 kg)	Oct 1, 2015
Tim Harrison #66 PF	Recruit ratings: Scout: Rivals: 247Sports: (3)				
Austin Meyer #51 C	Mustang, OK	Mustang High School	6 ft 9 in (2.06 m)	205 lb (93 kg)	Nov 25, 2015
Austin Meyer #51 C	Recruit ratings: Scout: Rivals: 247Sports: (3)				
B.J. Martin #92 PF	Waltham, MA	Tilton School	6 ft 6 in (1.98 m)	210 lb (95 kg)	Jan 15, 2016
B.J. Martin #92 PF	Recruit ratings: Scout: Rivals: 247Sports: (2)				
Corey Douglas; PF	Louisville, KY	Fork Union Military Academy	6 ft 6 in (1.98 m)	200 lb (91 kg)	Mar 26, 2016
Corey Douglas; PF	Recruit ratings: Scout: Rivals: 247Sports: (2)				
Overall recruit ranking:
Note: In many cases, Scout, Rivals, 247Sports, On3, and ESPN may conflict in their listings of height and weight.; In these cases, the average was taken. ESPN grades are on a 100-point scale.; Sources: "2016 Team Ranking". Rivals.

== Roster ==
2016–17 Rice Owls men's basketball team
Players
Coaches

Pos.	#	Name	Height	Weight	Year	Previous school	Hometown
G	0	Connor Cashaw	6 ft 5 in (1.96 m)	205 lb (93 kg)	So	Stevenson High School	Lincolnshire, Illinois
G	2	Marcus Evans	6 ft 2 in (1.88 m)	195 lb (88 kg)	So	Cape Henry Collegiate School	Chesapeake, Virginia
F	3	Robert Martin	6 ft 6 in (1.98 m)	220 lb (100 kg)	Fr	Tilton School	Pittsburgh, Pennsylvania
G/F	4	Egor Koulechov	6 ft 5 in (1.96 m)	210 lb (95 kg)	RS Jr	Arizona State	Volgograd, Russia
G	5	Ako Adams	6 ft 2 in (1.88 m)	170 lb (77 kg)	Fr	Bishop Denis J. O'Connell High School	Washington, D.C.
F	11	Corey Douglas	6 ft 8 in (2.03 m)	190 lb (86 kg)	Fr	Fork Union Military Academy	Louisville, Kentucky
F	12	Marquez Letcher-Ellis	6 ft 7 in (2.01 m)	205 lb (93 kg)	So	Montverde Academy	Houston, Texas
G	13	Addison Owen (W)	6 ft 5 in (1.96 m)	190 lb (86 kg)	Fr	The Paideia School	Atlanta, Georgia
G	15	Bishop Mency	6 ft 5 in (1.96 m)	215 lb (98 kg)	Jr	Chino Hills High School	Chino Hills, California
G	20	Grant Youngkin (W)	6 ft 3 in (1.91 m)	180 lb (82 kg)	Fr	St. Albans School	Washington, D.C.
G	21	Chad Lott	6 ft 3 in (1.91 m)	190 lb (86 kg)	RS Fr	C. E. Byrd High School	Shreveport, Louisiana
G	22	Marcus Jackson (C)	6 ft 3 in (1.91 m)	185 lb (84 kg)	Sr	Pacific Hills School	Acton, California
F	30	Austin Meyer	6 ft 9 in (2.06 m)	250 lb (113 kg)	Fr	Rouse High School	Pflugerville, Texas
G/F	31	Harrison Brown (W)	6 ft 4 in (1.93 m)	200 lb (91 kg)	So	McCallum High School	Austin, Texas
F	35	Tim Harrison	6 ft 8 in (2.03 m)	220 lb (100 kg)	Fr	Francis W. Parker School	San Diego, California
C	54	Andrew Drone	6 ft 10 in (2.08 m)	260 lb (118 kg)	Sr	Gallatin High School	Ridgway, Illinois

Head coach

- Mike Rhoades (Lebanon Valley)

Assistant coach(es)

- Scott Pera (Penn State)
- J.D. Byers (Lebanon Valley)
- Brent Scott (Rice)

Legend

- (C) Team captain
- (S) Suspended
- (I) Ineligible
- (W) Walk-on
- Injured
- Current redshirt

Roster

== Schedule and results ==
Date time, TV	Rank^{#}	Opponent^{#}	Result	Record	Site (attendance) city, state
Exhibition
11/05/2016*; 7:00 pm		Our Lady of the Lake	W 96–86		Tudor Fieldhouse; Houston, TX
Non-conference regular season
11/13/2016*; 1:00 pm		at James Madison	W 94–70	1–0	JMU Convocation Center (3,480); Harrisonburg, VA
11/16/2016*; 7:00 pm		Texas Southern	L 68–71	1–1	Tudor Fieldhouse (2,082); Houston, TX
11/19/2016*; 1:00 pm		at Nebraska–Omaha	W 100–87	2–1	Baxter Arena (1,814); Omaha, NE
11/21/2016*; 7:00 pm		Montana State	W 83–78	3–1	Tudor Fieldhouse (1,408); Houston, TX
11/23/2016*; 7:00 pm		Delaware State	W 80–58	4–1	Tudor Fieldhouse (1,275); Houston, TX
11/26/2016*; 3:00 pm		at Incarnate Word	W 87–79	5–1	McDermott Center (530); San Antonio, TX
11/30/2016*; 7:00 pm		Houston Baptist	W 90–77	6–1	Tudor Fieldhouse (1,766); Houston, TX
12/03/2016*; 1:00 pm, FSSW		at Texas Tech	L 84–85	6–2	United Supermarkets Arena (10,452); Lubbock, TX
12/10/2016*; 7:00 pm		Stephen F. Austin	W 70–63	7–2	Tudor Fieldhouse (2,205); Houston, TX
12/15/2016*; 11:45 am		St. Edward's	W 93–64	8–2	Tudor Fieldhouse (5,307); Houston, TX
12/17/2016*; 6:00 pm, ACCN Extra		at Pittsburgh	L 73–83	8–3	Peterson Events Center (7,017); Pittsburgh, PA
12/19/2016*; 7:00 pm		Northwestern State	W 100–93	9–3	Tudor Fieldhouse (1,555); Houston, TX
12/21/2016*; 7:00 pm		St. Thomas	W 83–63	10–3	Tudor Fieldhouse (1,878); Houston, TX
Conference USA regular season
12/31/2016; 12:00 pm		at Old Dominion	L 56–62	10–4 (0–1)	Ted Constant Convocation Center (5,431); Norfolk, VA
01/02/2017; 6:00 pm, ESPN3		at Charlotte	W 89–70	11–4 (1–1)	Dale F. Halton Arena (3,660); Charlotte, NC
01/05/2017; 7:00 pm, beIN		Middle Tennessee	L 77–80	11–5 (1–2)	Tudor Fieldhouse (1,513); Houston, TX
01/07/2017; 7:00 pm		UAB	L 81–88 ^{OT}	11–6 (1–3)	Tudor Fieldhouse (2,001); Houston, TX
01/14/2017; 2:00 pm		North Texas	W 101–79	12–6 (2–3)	Tudor Fieldhouse (2,749); Houston, TX
01/19/2017; 6:30 pm		at Louisiana Tech	L 64–74	12–7 (2–4)	Thomas Assembly Center (3,313); Ruston, LA
01/21/2017; 4:00 pm		at Southern Miss	W 61–58	13–7 (3–4)	Reed Green Coliseum (2,366); Hattiesburg, MS
01/26/2017; 7:00 pm, CI		Old Dominion	L 72–80	13–8 (3–5)	Tudor Fieldhouse (1,460); Houston, TX
01/28/2017; 7:00 pm		Charlotte	W 84–67	14–8 (4–5)	Tudor Fieldhouse (2,206); Houston, TX
02/04/2017; 2:00 pm		at North Texas	W 95–80	15–8 (5–5)	The Super Pit (2,154); Denton, TX
02/09/2017; 6:00 pm		at FIU	W 89–78	16–8 (6–5)	FIU Arena (802); Miami, FL
02/11/2017; 6:00 pm		at Florida Atlantic	W 81–75 ^{OT}	17–8 (7–5)	FAU Arena (1,655); Boca Raton, FL
02/16/2017; 7:00 pm		UTSA	W 80–68	18–8 (8–5)	Tudor Fieldhouse (1,713); Houston, TX
02/18/2017; 7:00 pm		UTEP	L 71–79	18–9 (8–6)	Tudor Fieldhouse (2,988); Houston, TX
02/23/2017; 7:00 pm		Southern Miss	W 72–71 ^{OT}	19–9 (9–6)	Tudor Fieldhouse (1,589); Houston, TX
02/25/2017; 7:00 pm		Louisiana Tech	W 88–81	20–9 (10–6)	Tudor Fieldhouse (3,302); Houston, TX
03/02/2017; 6:00 pm		at Marshall	W 89–88	21–9 (11–6)	Cam Henderson Center (4,994); Huntington, WV
03/04/2017; 7:00 pm		at WKU	L 72–79	21–10 (11–7)	E. A. Diddle Arena (4,283); Bowling Green, KY
Conference USA tournament
03/08/2017; 2:00 pm, CI	(5)	vs. (12) Southern Miss; First round	W 86–75	22–10	Legacy Arena (3,207); Birmingham, AL
03/09/2017; 2:00 pm, ASN	(5)	vs. (4) UTEP; Quarterfinals	L 76–86	22–11	Legacy Arena (3,228); Birmingham, AL
CBI
03/15/2017*; 7:00 pm		San Francisco; First Round	W 85–76	23–11	Tudor Fieldhouse (3,207); Houston, TX
03/20/2017*; 7:00 pm		Utah Valley; Quarterfinals	L 79–85	23–12	Tudor Fieldhouse (1,584); Houston, TX
*Non-conference game. ^{#}Rankings from AP Poll. (#) Tournament seedings in parentheses. All times are in Central Time. Source

== See also ==
2016–17 Rice Owls women's basketball team
