= 2016–17 Louisiana Tech Bulldogs basketball team =

American college basketball season

2016–17 Louisiana Tech Bulldogs basketball
- Conference: Conference USA
- Record: 23–10 (14–4 C-USA)
- Head coach: Eric Konkol (2nd season)
- Assistant coaches: Duffy Conroy; Yaphett King; Tony Skinn
- Home arena: Thomas Assembly Center

2016–17 Conference USA men's basketball standings
	Conf.				Overall
Team	W		L	PCT	W		L	PCT
Middle Tennessee †	17	–	1	.944	31	–	5	.861
Louisiana Tech	14	–	4	.778	23	–	10	.697
Old Dominion	12	–	6	.667	19	–	12	.613
UTEP	12	–	6	.667	15	–	17	.469
Rice	11	–	7	.611	23	–	12	.657
Marshall	10	–	8	.556	20	–	15	.571
UAB	9	–	9	.500	17	–	16	.515
Western Kentucky	9	–	9	.500	15	–	17	.469
UTSA	8	–	10	.444	14	–	19	.424
Charlotte	7	–	11	.389	13	–	17	.433
Florida Atlantic	6	–	12	.333	10	–	20	.333
Southern Miss	6	–	12	.333	9	–	22	.290
FIU	3	–	15	.167	7	–	24	.226
North Texas	2	–	16	.111	8	–	22	.267
† 2017 C-USA Tournament winner

The 2016–17 Louisiana Tech Bulldogs Basketball Team represented Louisiana Tech University during the 2016–17 NCAA Division I Men's Basketball Season. The Bulldogs, led by second-year head coach Eric Konkol, played their home games at the Thomas Assembly Center in Ruston, Louisiana and were members of Conference USA. They finished the season 23–10, 14–4 in C-USA play to finish in second place. They beat UAB in the quarterfinals of the C-USA Tournament before losing to Marshall in the semifinals. Despite finishing with 23 wins, the school declined to participate in a postseason tournament marking the first time since 2013 that they did not participate in a postseason tournament.

== Previous season ==
The Bulldogs finished the 2015–16 season 23–10, 12–6 in C-USA play to finish in three-way tie for third place. They lost in the quarterfinals of the C-USA tournament to Old Dominion. They received an invitation to the inaugural Vegas 16 where they lost in the quarterfinals to East Tennessee State.

== Preseason ==
The Bulldogs were picked to finish in seventh place in the preseason Conference USA poll. Erik McCree was selected to the preseason All-Conference USA team.

== Departures ==
Name	Number	Pos.	Height	Weight	Year	Hometown	Notes
Alex Hamilton	0	G	6'4"	190	Senior	Chipley, FL	Graduated
Dayon Griffin	10	G	6'5"	188	Sophomore	St. Petersburg, FL	Transferred to Central Florida
Branden Sheppard	15	F	6'7"	225	RS Freshman	Shreveport, LA	Transferred to Pearl River CC
Merrill Holden	21	F	6'8"	215	Junior	Lincoln, NE	Graduate transferred to Iowa State

=== Incoming transfers ===
Name	Number	Pos.	Height	Weight	Year	Hometown	Notes
Omar Sherman	24	F	6'8"	225	Junior	Duncanville, Texas	Junior college transferred from Paris Junior College

== Recruiting class of 2016 ==
College recruiting information
Name	Hometown	School	Height	Weight	Commit date
DaQuan Bracey; PG	Baltimore, MD	St. Frances Academy	5 ft 8 in (1.73 m)	170 lb (77 kg)	Nov 17, 2015
DaQuan Bracey; PG	Recruit ratings: Scout: Rivals: 247Sports: ESPN:				
Jalen Harris; SG	Duncanville, TX	Duncanville High School	6 ft 4 in (1.93 m)	185 lb (84 kg)	Sep 22, 2015
Jalen Harris; SG	Recruit ratings: Scout: Rivals: ESPN:				
JaColby Pemberton; SG	Lancaster, TX	Lancaster High School	6 ft 6 in (1.98 m)	N/A	Oct 17, 2015
JaColby Pemberton; SG	Recruit ratings: Scout: Rivals: ESPN:				
Oliver Powell; PF	Rowlett, TX	Rowlett High School	6 ft 8 in (2.03 m)	200 lb (91 kg)	Sep 24, 2015
Oliver Powell; PF	Recruit ratings: Scout: Rivals: ESPN:				
Overall recruit ranking: 247Sports: #127
Note: In many cases, Scout, Rivals, 247Sports, On3, and ESPN may conflict in their listings of height and weight.; In these cases, the average was taken. ESPN grades are on a 100-point scale.; Sources: "2016 Team Ranking". Rivals.

=== Recruiting class of 2017 ===
College recruiting information (2017)
Name	Hometown	School	Height	Weight	Commit date
Amorie Archibald; SG	Deltona, FL	Trinity Christian Academy	6 ft 3 in (1.91 m)	180 lb (82 kg)	Sep 30, 2016
Amorie Archibald; SG	Recruit ratings: Scout: Rivals: ESPN:				
Exavian Christon; SG	Hot Springs, AR	Hot Springs High School	6 ft 4 in (1.93 m)	190 lb (86 kg)	Sep 21, 2016
Exavian Christon; SG	Recruit ratings: Scout: Rivals: ESPN:				
Anthony Duruji; F	Potomac, MD	St. Andrews Episcopal School	6 ft 7 in (2.01 m)	190 lb (86 kg)	May 17, 2016
Anthony Duruji; F	Recruit ratings: Scout: Rivals: ESPN:				
Overall recruit ranking:
Note: In many cases, Scout, Rivals, 247Sports, On3, and ESPN may conflict in their listings of height and weight.; In these cases, the average was taken. ESPN grades are on a 100-point scale.; Sources: "2017 Team Ranking". Rivals.

== Roster ==
2016–17 Louisiana Tech Bulldogs men's basketball team
Players
Coaches

Pos.	#	Name	Height	Weight	Year	Previous school	Hometown
G	0	Jacobi Boykins	6 ft 6 in (1.98 m)	175 lb (79 kg)	Jr	Lakewood High School	St. Petersburg, Florida
G	1	Derric Jean	6 ft 2 in (1.88 m)	185 lb (84 kg)	So	McArthur High School	Miami, Florida
F	2	Erik McCree	6 ft 8 in (2.03 m)	225 lb (102 kg)	RS Sr	Murray State	Orlando, Florida
G	3	Jalen Harris	6 ft 4 in (1.93 m)	190 lb (86 kg)	Fr	Duncanville High School	Duncanville, Texas
G	4	DaQuan Bracey	5 ft 11 in (1.8 m)	170 lb (77 kg)	Fr	St. Frances Academy	Baltimore, Maryland
C	5	Joniah White	7 ft 0 in (2.13 m)	205 lb (93 kg)	RS So	Grenada High School	Duck Hill, Mississippi
F	11	JaColby Pemberton (injured) (redshirt)	6 ft 6 in (1.98 m)	180 lb (82 kg)	Fr	Lancaster High School	Dallas, Texas
G	15	Jeremiah Taylor (W)	6 ft 4 in (1.93 m)	190 lb (86 kg)	Fr	Lewisville High School	Lewisville, Texas
F	22	Jy'lan Washington	6 ft 8 in (2.03 m)	190 lb (86 kg)	So	Stewarts Creek High School	Smyrna, Tennessee
G	23	Da'Shawn Robinson (injured)	6 ft 4 in (1.93 m)	210 lb (95 kg)	Sr	Navarro College	Houston, Texas
F	24	Omar Sherman	6 ft 9 in (2.06 m)	255 lb (116 kg)	Jr	Paris Junior College	Duncanville, Texas
G	25	Qiydar Davis (injured)	6 ft 6 in (1.98 m)	220 lb (100 kg)	RS Sr	Indian Hills Community College	Atlanta, Georgia
G	30	Luke Walker (W)	6 ft 2 in (1.88 m)	185 lb (84 kg)	So	Brother Martin High School	New Orleans, Louisiana
F	35	Oliver Powell	6 ft 8 in (2.03 m)	220 lb (100 kg)	Fr	Rowlett High School	Rowlett, Texas

Head coach

- Eric Konkol (UW–Eau Claire)

Assistant coach(es)

- Duffy Conroy (St. Ambrose)
- Yaphett King (Cal State Fullerton)
- Tony Skinn (George Mason)

Legend

- (C) Team captain
- (S) Suspended
- (I) Ineligible
- (W) Walk-on
- Injured
- Current redshirt

Roster

== Schedule and results ==
Date time, TV	Rank^{#}	Opponent^{#}	Result	Record	Site (attendance) city, state
Exhibition
11/03/2016*; 6:30 pm		Southern Arkansas	W 86–69		Thomas Assembly Center; Ruston, LA
Non-conference regular season
11/11/2016*; 5:30 pm		at South Carolina	L 76–85	0–1	Colonial Life Arena (13,344); Columbia, SC
11/16/2016*; 6:30 pm		Alabama State	W 87–56	1–1	Thomas Assembly Center (3,016); Ruston, LA
11/19/2016*; 7:00 pm, ESPN3		at Nebraska	L 54–65	1–2	Pinnacle Bank Arena (15,824); Lincoln, NE
11/23/2016*; 6:30 pm		Oklahoma Baptist	W 79–63	2–2	Thomas Assembly Center (2,017); Ruston, LA
11/27/2016*; 4:00 pm		Maryland Eastern Shore; California Bears Classic	W 74–53	3–2	Thomas Assembly Center (2,027); Ruston, LA
11/30/2016*; 8:00 pm, P12N		at California; California Bears Classic	L 59–68 ^{OT}	3–3	Haas Pavilion (8,129); Berkeley, CA
12/03/2016*; 6:00 pm		Southeastern Louisiana; California Bears Classic	W 88–59	4–3	Thomas Assembly Center (2,764); Ruston, LA
12/05/2016*; 6:30 pm		Alcorn State; California Bears Classic	W 98–65	5–3	Thomas Assembly Center (2,424); Ruston, LA
12/10/2016*; 7:15 pm		at Louisiana–Lafayette	L 83–91	5–4	Cajundome (4,491); Lafayette, LA
12/13/2016*; 6:30 pm		Prairie View A&M	W 65–52	6–4	Thomas Assembly Center (2,213); Ruston, LA
12/17/2016*; 7:00 pm		vs. Grambling State; Shreveport-Bossier Holiday Classic	W 89–55	7–4	Hirsch Memorial Coliseum (877); Shreveport, LA
12/20/2016*; 6:30 pm		Florida Gulf Coast	L 78–79	7–5	Thomas Assembly Center (2,277); Ruston, LA
12/22/2016*; 6:30 pm		LSU–Shreveport	W 95–53	8–5	Thomas Assembly Center (2,044); Ruston, LA
Conference USA regular season
01/01/2017; 2:00 pm		at Southern Miss	W 79–55	9–5 (1–0)	Reed Green Coliseum (2,761); Hattiesburg, MS
01/05/2017; 6:30 pm		UTEP	W 64–44	10–5 (2–0)	Thomas Assembly Center (3,205); Ruston, LA
01/07/2017; 6:00 pm		UTSA	L 68–69	10–6 (2–1)	Thomas Assembly Center (3,513); Ruston, LA
01/12/2017; 6:00 pm, ESPN3		at Charlotte	W 79–73	11–6 (3–1)	Dale F. Halton Arena (4,319); Charlotte, NC
01/14/2017; 5:00 pm		at Old Dominion	W 75–63	12–6 (4–1)	Ted Constant Convocation Center (6,564); Norfolk, VA
01/19/2017; 6:30 pm		Rice	W 74–64	13–6 (5–1)	Thomas Assembly Center (3,313); Ruston, LA
01/21/2017; 6:00 pm		North Texas	W 81–57	14–6 (6–1)	Thomas Assembly Center (3,066); Ruston, LA
01/26/2017; 8:00 pm, ASN		at UAB	L 70–79	14–7 (6–2)	Bartow Arena (3,642); Birmingham, AL
01/28/2017; 5:00 pm, ESPN3		at Middle Tennessee	L 61–71	14–8 (6–3)	Murphy Center (7,805); Murfreesboro, TN
02/02/2017; 7:00 pm, beIN		WKU	W 76–67	15–8 (7–3)	Thomas Assembly Center (3,802); Ruston, LA
02/04/2017; 6:00 pm		Marshall	W 94–90	16–8 (8–3)	Thomas Assembly Center (4,804); Ruston, LA
02/09/2017; 8:00 pm		at UTEP	W 62–61	17–8 (9–3)	Don Haskins Center (6,698); El Paso, TX
02/11/2017; 3:00 pm		at UTSA	W 72–66	18–8 (10–3)	Convocation Center (1,212); San Antonio, TX
02/16/2017; 6:30 pm		Florida Atlantic	W 95–69	19–8 (11–3)	Thomas Assembly Center (3,012); Ruston, LA
02/18/2017; 6:00 pm		FIU	W 77–61	20–8 (12–3)	Thomas Assembly Center (3,418); Ruston, LA
02/23/2017; 7:00 pm		at North Texas	W 85–67	21–8 (13–3)	The Super Pit (2,217); Denton, TX
02/25/2017; 7:00 pm		at Rice	L 81–88	21–9 (13–4)	Tudor Fieldhouse (3,302); Houston, TX
03/04/2017; 1:00 pm, ASN		Southern Miss	W 93–65	22–9 (14–4)	Thomas Assembly Center (3,102); Ruston, LA
Conference USA tournament
03/09/2017; 5:30 pm, ASN	(2)	vs. (7) UAB; Quarterfinals	W 69–57	23–9	Legacy Arena (4,005); Birmingham, AL
03/10/2017; 2:00 pm, CBSSN	(2)	vs. (6) Marshall; Semifinals	L 77–93	23–10	Legacy Arena (3,299); Birmingham, AL
*Non-conference game. (#) Tournament seedings in parentheses. All times are in Central Time Source.
