= 2016–17 Prairie View A&M Panthers basketball team =

American college basketball season

2016–17 Prairie View A&M Panthers basketball
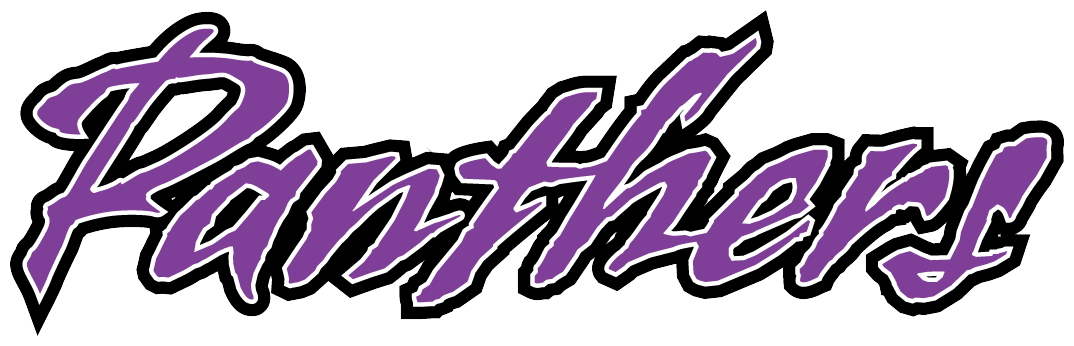
- Conference: Southwestern Athletic Conference
- Record: 13–20 (10–8 SWAC)
- Head coach: Byron Smith (1st season)
- Assistant coaches: Keenan Curry; Landon Bussie; Derrick Daniels
- Home arena: William Nicks Building

2016–17 SWAC men's basketball standings
	Conf.				Overall
Team	W		L	PCT	W		L	PCT
Texas Southern †	16	–	2	.889	23	–	12	.657
Alcorn State*	13	–	5	.722	18	–	14	.563
Grambling State	10	–	8	.556	16	–	17	.485
Jackson State	10	–	8	.556	14	–	18	.438
Southern	10	–	8	.556	15	–	18	.455
Prairie View A&M	10	–	8	.556	13	–	20	.394
Mississippi Valley State	7	–	11	.389	7	–	25	.219
Alabama State	6	–	12	.333	8	–	23	.258
Arkansas–Pine Bluff	6	–	12	.333	7	–	25	.219
Alabama A&M	2	–	16	.111	2	–	27	.069
† 2017 SWAC tournament winner *ineligible for postseason due to APR violations

The 2016–17 Prairie View A&M Panthers basketball team represented Prairie View A&M University during the 2016–17 NCAA Division I men's basketball season. The Panthers, led by first-year head coach Byron Smith, played their home games at the William Nicks Building in Prairie View, Texas as members of the Southwestern Athletic Conference. They finished the season 13–20, 10–8 in SWAC play to finish in a four-way tie for third place. As the No. 4 seed in the SWAC tournament, they lost to Grambling State in the quarterfinals.

== Previous season ==
The Panthers finished the 2015–16 season 7–24, 7–11 in SWAC play to finish in sixth place. They lost in the quarterfinals of the SWAC tournament to Jackson State.

On January 27, 2016, following a 1–16 start to the season, head coach Byron Rimm II resigned. Assistant coach Byron Smith was named interim coach. On March 14, Prairie View A&M removed the interim coach tag and named Byron Smith head coach.

== Roster ==
2016–17 Prairie View A&M Panthers men's basketball team
Players
Coaches

Pos.	#	Name	Height	Weight	Year	Hometown
G	1	Troy Thompson	6 ft 4 in (1.93 m)	190 lb (86 kg)	Jr	Oakland, CA
G	2	Avery Lomax	5 ft 9 in (1.75 m)	160 lb (73 kg)	Sr	Desoto, TX
G	3	Jordan Giddings	6 ft 7 in (2.01 m)	180 lb (82 kg)	RS Jr	Dallas, TX
F	4	Yusef Yakubu	6 ft 7 in (2.01 m)	225 lb (102 kg)	Jr	Buffalo, NY
G	5	Tevin Bellinger	6 ft 0 in (1.83 m)	180 lb (82 kg)	Sr	Hutto, TX
F	10	Lavonne Davis	6 ft 8 in (2.03 m)	200 lb (91 kg)	Fr	Cleveland, OH
G	11	Ja'Donta Blakley	6 ft 2 in (1.88 m)	180 lb (82 kg)	Sr	Lake Charles, LA
C	12	JD Wallace	6 ft 9 in (2.06 m)	205 lb (93 kg)	Jr	Dallas, TX
F	14	Zachary Hamilton	6 ft 4 in (1.93 m)	200 lb (91 kg)	Jr	Houston, TX
F	15	Nolan Wilson	6 ft 6 in (1.98 m)	230 lb (104 kg)	RS Jr	Laredo, TX
F	21	Shay'rone Jett	6 ft 8 in (2.03 m)	190 lb (86 kg)	Jr	Hartsville, SC
G	22	Shaquille Preston	6 ft 4 in (1.93 m)	185 lb (84 kg)	Fr	New Orleans, LA
F	23	Admassu Williams	6 ft 8 in (2.03 m)	240 lb (109 kg)	Sr	Santa Monica, CA
F	24	Jordan Lumpkins	6 ft 4 in (1.93 m)	215 lb (98 kg)	Sr	New Orleans, LA
G	30	L.J. Westbrook	6 ft 3 in (1.91 m)	180 lb (82 kg)	Jr	Salem, OR
G	32	Travis Barnes	6 ft 8 in (2.03 m)	220 lb (100 kg)	Sr	Wilson, NC

Head coach

- Byron Smith

Assistant coach(es)

- Keenan Curry
- Landon Bussie
- Derrick Daniels

Legend

- (C) Team captain
- (S) Suspended
- (I) Ineligible
- (W) Walk-on
- Injured
- Current redshirt

== Schedule and results ==
Date time, TV	Rank^{#}	Opponent^{#}	Result	Record	Site (attendance) city, state
Exhibition
11/07/16*; 7:00		Champion Christian	W 101–40		William J. Nicks Building; Prairie View, TX
Non-conference regular season
11/11/16*; 8:00 pm, PAC-12 Network		at Oregon State	L 58–78	0–1	Gill Coliseum (4,765); Corvallis, OR
11/14/16*; 9:00 pm, Mountain West Network		at Fresno State	W 84–78	1–1	Save Mart Center (6,036); Fresno, CA
11/16/16*; 9:00 pm, The W.TV		at No. 17 Saint Mary's	L 72–110	1–2	McKeon Pavilion (2,673); Moraga, CA
11/19/16*; 7:00 pm, C-USA TV		at UTSA	L 59–69	1–3	Convocation Center (1,065); San Antonio, TX
11/22/16*; 6:00 pm		Jarvis Christian	W 84–69	2–3	William J. Nicks Building (249); Prairie View, TX
11/25/16*; 4:00 pm		Lamar	L 83–91	2–4	William J. Nicks Building (183); Prairie View, TX
11/27/16*; 1:00 pm, ESPN3		at No. 16 Wisconsin	L 50–95	2–5	Kohl Center (17,287); Madison, WI
12/03/16*; 4:00 pm, ESPN3		at Houston	L 61–105	2–6	Hofheinz Pavilion (3,091); Houston, TX
12/06/16*; 7:00 pm		at Kansas State	L 55–74	2–7	Bramlage Coliseum (10,865); Manhattan, KS
12/10/16*; 4:00 pm		at Texas State	L 57–64	2–8	Strahan Coliseum (2,117); San Marcos, TX
12/13/16*; 6:30 pm		at Louisiana Tech	L 52–65	2–9	Thomas Assembly Center (2,213); Ruston, LA
12/17/16*; 5:00 pm, PAC-12 Network		at Utah	L 60–92	2–10	Jon M. Huntsman Center (13,100); Salt Lake City, UT
12/22/16*; 11:00 am, A-10 Network		at George Mason	L 59–75	2–11	EagleBank Arena (5,584); Fairfax, VA
12/28/16*; 7:00 pm		Huston-Tillotson	W 87–57	3–11	William J. Nicks Building (194); Prairie View, TX
SWAC regular season
01/02/17; 7:30 pm		at Southern	L 57–59	3–12 (0–1)	F. G. Clark Center (463); Baton Rouge, LA
01/04/17; 7:30 pm		at Alcorn State	L 55–66	3–13 (0–2)	Davey Whitney Complex (249); Lorman, MS
01/07/17; 5:00 pm		Texas Southern	L 82–87	3–14 (0–3)	William J. Nicks Building (672); Prairie View, TX
01/14/17; 5:00 pm		Jackson State	W 63–56	4–14 (1–3)	William J. Nicks Building (435); Prairie View, TX
01/16/17; 7:30 pm		Grambling State	W 94–82	5–14 (2–3)	William J. Nicks Building; Prairie View, TX
01/21/17; 4:00 pm		at Mississippi Valley State	W 87–72	6–14 (3–3)	Harrison HPER Complex (4,087); Itta Bena, MS
01/23/17; 7:30 pm		at Arkansas–Pine Bluff	L 68–71 ^{2OT}	6–15 (3–4)	K. L. Johnson Complex (1,654); Pine Bluff, AR
01/28/17; 5:00 pm		Alabama A&M	W 70–65	7–15 (4–4)	William J. Nicks Building (824); Prairie View, TX
01/30/17; 8:00 pm		Alabama State	W 72–52	8–15 (5–4)	William J. Nicks Building (1,005); Prairie View, TX
02/04/17; 7:30 pm		at Texas Southern	L 61–74	8–16 (5–5)	Health and Physical Education Arena (7,235); Houston, TX
02/11/17; 5:00 pm		at Jackson State	L 69–78	8–17 (5–6)	Williams Assembly Center (899); Jackson, MS
02/13/17; 7:30 pm		at Grambling State	L 58–61	8–18 (5–7)	Fredrick C. Hobdy Assembly Center (287); Grambling, LA
02/18/17; 5:00 pm		Mississippi Valley State	W 82–69	9–18 (6–7)	William J. Nicks Building (976); Prairie View, TX
02/20/17; 7:30 pm		Arkansas-Pine Bluff	W 73–55	10–18 (7–7)	William J. Nicks Building (1,273); Prairie View, TX
02/25/17; 6:00 pm		at Alabama A&M	L 74–87	10–19 (7–8)	Elmore Gymnasium (1,578); Huntsville, AL
02/27/17; 7:30 pm		at Alabama State	W 77–58	11–19 (8–8)	Dunn–Oliver Acadome (1,632); Montgomery, AL
03/02/17; 7:30 pm		Southern	W 70–64	12–19 (9–8)	William J. Nicks Building (1,200); Prairie View, TX
03/04/17; 5:00 pm		Alcorn State	W 66–60	13–19 (10–8)	William J. Nicks Building (1,300); Prairie View, TX
SWAC tournament
03/07/17; 9:00 pm, ESPNU	(4)	(5) Grambling State; Quarterfinals	L 77–81	13–20	William J. Nicks Building (1,336); Prairie View, TX
*Non-conference game. ^{#}Rankings from AP Poll. (#) Tournament seedings in parentheses. All times are in Central Time.
