= Willie Hayes (basketball) =

American basketball coach

Biographical details
- Born: July 12, 1967 (age 59); Bessemer, Alabama, U.S.

Playing career
- 1985–1989: Alabama A&M
- Position: Guard

Coaching career (HC unless noted)
- 1995–2011: Alabama A&M (asst.)
- 2011–2017: Alabama A&M

Head coaching record
- Overall: 54–121 (.309)

Willie Hayes (born July 12, 1967) is the former college basketball head coach for Alabama A&M University. He signed in 2011 and the contract will go through the 2015 season. He resigned after the 2016–17 season in which the Bulldogs went 2–27.

== Head coaching record ==
Record table
Season	Team	Overall	Conference	Standing	Postseason
Alabama A&M Bulldogs (SWAC) (2011–2017)
2011–12	Alabama A&M	7–21	5–13	T–8th	
2012–13	Alabama A&M	11–20	6–12	8th	
2013–14	Alabama A&M	14–16	10–8	5th	
2014–15	Alabama A&M	9–20	8–10	7th	
2015–16	Alabama A&M	11–18	6–12	T–7th	
2016–17	Alabama A&M	2–27	2–16	10th	
Alabama A&M:		54–121 (.309)	37–71 (.343)		
Total:		54–121 (.309)			
National champion Postseason invitational champion Conference regular season champion Conference regular season and conference tournament champion Division regular season champion Division regular season and conference tournament champion Conference tournament champion

== College basketball ==
Hayes played point guard for AAMU. He broke many school records and is considered to be one of the best to ever play for AAMU. He broke his school record for career assists (669) in 1997 and has also achieved honors such as SIAC Player of the Year in 1989, AAMU Male Athlete of the Year, and Mayor's Cup Classic MVP.
