= 2016–17 Alcorn State Braves basketball team =

American college basketball season

2016–17 Alcorn State Braves basketball
- Conference: Southwestern Athletic Conference
- Record: 18–14 (13–5 SWAC)
- Head coach: Montez Robinson (2nd season)
- Assistant coaches: Delvin Thompson; Derek Thompson; Frank Popieski
- Home arena: Davey Whitney Complex

2016–17 SWAC men's basketball standings
| | Conf. | | | | Overall |
| Team | W | | L | PCT | W | | L | PCT |
|---|---|---|---|---|---|---|---|---|
| Texas Southern † | 16 | – | 2 | .889 | 23 | – | 12 | .657 |
| Alcorn State* | 13 | – | 5 | .722 | 18 | – | 14 | .563 |
| Grambling State | 10 | – | 8 | .556 | 16 | – | 17 | .485 |
| Jackson State | 10 | – | 8 | .556 | 14 | – | 18 | .438 |
| Southern | 10 | – | 8 | .556 | 15 | – | 18 | .455 |
| Prairie View A&M | 10 | – | 8 | .556 | 13 | – | 20 | .394 |
| Mississippi Valley State | 7 | – | 11 | .389 | 7 | – | 25 | .219 |
| Alabama State | 6 | – | 12 | .333 | 8 | – | 23 | .258 |
| Arkansas–Pine Bluff | 6 | – | 12 | .333 | 7 | – | 25 | .219 |
| Alabama A&M | 2 | – | 16 | .111 | 2 | – | 27 | .069 |
† 2017 SWAC tournament winner *ineligible for postseason due to APR violations

The 2016–17 Alcorn State Braves basketball team represented Alcorn State University during the 2016–17 NCAA Division I men's basketball season. The Braves, led by second year head coach Montez Robinson, played their home games at the Davey Whitney Complex in Lorman, Mississippi as members of the Southwestern Athletic Conference. They finished the season 18–14, 13–5 in SWAC play to finish in second place.

The Braves were ineligible for NCAA postseason play due to APR violations for the second straight year. However, they were allowed to participate in the SWAC tournament where they defeated Mississippi Valley State and Southern to advance to the championship game where they lost to Texas Southern.

== Previous season ==
The Braves finished the 2015–16 season 15–15, 13–5 in SWAC play to finish in second place. They lost to Mississippi Valley State in the quarterfinals of the SWAC tournament. The Braves were ineligible for NCAA postseason play due to APR violations.

== Roster ==
2016–17 Alcorn State Braves men's basketball team
Players
Coaches

| Pos. | # | Name | Height | Weight | Year | Hometown |
|---|---|---|---|---|---|---|
| G | 0 | Rahamanh Katumbusi | 6 ft 3 in (1.91 m) | 195 lb (88 kg) | So | Chicago, Illinois |
| G | 1 | Denzel Dulin | 6 ft 4 in (1.93 m) | 200 lb (91 kg) | Sr | Queens, New York |
| G | 2 | A.J. Mosby | 6 ft 3 in (1.91 m) | 160 lb (73 kg) | Jr | Cartersville, Georgia |
| F | 3 | Tyler Carter | 6 ft 7 in (2.01 m) | 200 lb (91 kg) | Fr | Houston, Texas |
| F | 4 | DeAndre Davis | 6 ft 8 in (2.03 m) | 220 lb (100 kg) | Sr | Spotsylvania, Virginia |
| G | 5 | Maurice Howard | 6 ft 1 in (1.85 m) | 190 lb (86 kg) | Fr | Quincy, Florida |
| F | 10 | Kobe Wilson | 6 ft 9 in (2.06 m) | 220 lb (100 kg) | Fr | Kennesaw, Georgia |
| G | 12 | Juwan Henderson | 5 ft 7 in (1.7 m) | 140 lb (64 kg) | Jr | Atlanta, Georgia |
| G | 15 | Avery Patterson | 6 ft 2 in (1.88 m) | 195 lb (88 kg) | Jr | Decatur, Georgia |
| F | 20 | Yalen Reed | 6 ft 7 in (2.01 m) | 200 lb (91 kg) | Fr | Nashville, Tennessee |
| F | 22 | TyQuaylon Smith | 6 ft 8 in (2.03 m) | 200 lb (91 kg) | So | Jackson, Louisiana |
| F | 24 | Reginal Johnson | 6 ft 5 in (1.96 m) | 250 lb (113 kg) | Jr | Monroe, Louisiana |
| F | 30 | Marquis Vance | 6 ft 7 in (2.01 m) | 265 lb (120 kg) | Sr | Tchula, Mississippi |
| F | 50 | Devon Brewer | 6 ft 8 in (2.03 m) | 260 lb (118 kg) | Fr | Hiram, Georgia |

Head coach

- Montez Robinson (North Georgia)

Assistant coach(es)

- Delvin Thompson (Alcorn State)
- Derek Thompson (Morris Brown)
- Frank Popieski (Florida State)

Legend

- (C) Team captain
- (S) Suspended
- (I) Ineligible
- (W) Walk-on
- Injured
- Current redshirt

Roster

== Schedule and results ==
| Date time, TV | Rank^{#} | Opponent^{#} | Result | Record | Site (attendance) city, state |
Non-conference regular season
| 11/11/16*; 7:30 pm, ESPN3 | | at Loyola-Chicago | L 44–69 | 0–1 | Joseph J. Gentile Arena (1,801); Chicago, IL |
| 11/14/16*; 8:00 pm, ESPN3 | | at Evansville | L 59–82 | 0–2 | Ford Center (3,669); Evansville, IN |
| 11/18/16*; 7:00 pm | | Selma | W 93–48 | 1–2 | Davey Whitney Complex (726); Lorman, MS |
| 11/22/16*; 7:00 pm | | Blue Mountain | W 83–57 | 2–2 | Davey Whitney Complex (334); Lorman, MS |
| 11/27/16*; 1:00 pm, MWN | | at Colorado State | L 58–80 | 2–3 | Moby Arena (2,023); Fort Collins, CO |
| 11/30/16*; 9:00 pm | | at San Francisco | L 65–78 | 2–4 | War Memorial Gymnasium (513); San Francisco, CA |
| 12/03/16*; 3:00 pm, P12N | | at California | L 59–83 | 2–5 | Haas Pavilion (8,257); Berkeley, CA |
| 12/05/16*; 6:30 pm | | at Louisiana Tech | L 65–98 | 2–6 | Thomas Assembly Center (2,424); Ruston, LA |
| 12/18/16*; 1:00 pm, ACCN | | at Georgia Tech | L 50–74 | 2–7 | Hank McCamish Pavilion (4,599); Atlanta, GA |
| 12/20/16*; 8:00 pm | | at Grand Canyon | L 53–63 | 2–8 | GCU Arena (5,807); Phoenix, AZ |
| 12/22/16*; 7:00 pm | | Rust | W 83–68 | 3–8 | Davey Whitney Complex (124); Lorman, MS |
SWAC regular season
| 01/02/17; 7:00 pm | | Texas Southern | L 65–67 | 3–9 (0–1) | Davey Whitney Complex (221); Lorman, MS |
| 01/04/17; 7:00 pm | | Prairie View A&M | W 66–55 | 4–9 (1–1) | Davey Whitney Complex (249); Lorman, MS |
| 01/07/17 | | at Jackson State; Postponed (inclement weather), rescheduled for 01/11/17 | | | Williams Assembly Center; Jackson, MS |
| 01/09/17; 7:30 pm | | at Grambling State | L 62–67 | 4–10 (1–2) | Fredrick C. Hobdy Assembly Center (743); Grambling, LA |
| 01/11/17; 7:30 pm | | at Jackson State | W 63–50 | 5–10 (2–2) | Williams Assembly Center (2,246); Jackson, MS |
| 01/14/17; 5:30 pm | | Mississippi Valley State | L 77–84 | 5–11 (2–3) | Davey Whitney Complex (1,538); Lorman, MS |
| 01/16/17; 7:00 pm | | Arkansas-Pine Bluff | W 82–64 | 6–11 (3–3) | Davey Whitney Complex (948); Lorman, MS |
| 01/21/17; 5:00 pm | | at Alabama State | W 78–71 | 7–11 (4–3) | Dunn–Oliver Acadome (1,256); Montgomery, AL |
| 01/23/17; 7:30 pm | | at Alabama A&M | W 81–70 | 8–11 (5–3) | Elmore Gymnasium (1,822); Huntsville, AL |
| 01/28/17; 5:30 pm | | Southern | W 74–64 | 9–11 (6–3) | Davey Whitney Complex (1,443); Lorman, MS |
| 02/04/17; 5:30 pm | | Jackson State | W 69–58 | 10–11 (7–3) | Davey Whitney Complex (1,914); Lorman, MS |
| 02/06/17; 7:00 pm | | Grambling State | W 75–65 | 11–11 (8–3) | Davey Whitney Complex (962); Lorman, MS |
| 02/11/17; 4:00 pm | | at Mississippi Valley State | W 88–77 | 12–11 (9–3) | Harrison HPER Complex (2,197); Itta Bena, MS |
| 02/13/17; 7:30 pm | | at Arkansas-Pine Bluff | W 70–58 | 13–11 (10–3) | K. L. Johnson Complex (1,348); Pine Bluff, AR |
| 02/18/17; 5:30 pm | | Alabama State | W 75–67 | 14–11 (11–3) | Davey Whitney Complex (656); Lorman, MS |
| 02/20/17; 7:00 pm | | Alabama A&M | W 74–59 | 15–11 (12–3) | Davey Whitney Complex (718); Lorman, MS |
| 02/25/17; 4:00 pm | | at Southern | W 68–67 | 16–11 (13–3) | F. G. Clark Center (1,021); Baton Rouge, LA |
| 03/02/17; 7:30 pm | | at Texas Southern | L 88–94 ^{OT} | 16–12 (13–4) | Health and Physical Education Arena (2,976); Houston, TX |
| 03/04/17; 5:30 pm | | at Prairie View A&M | L 60–66 | 16–13 (13–5) | William J. Nicks Building (1,300); Prairie View, TX |
SWAC tournament
| 03/07/17; 6:00 pm | (2) | (7) Mississippi Valley State; Quarterfinals | W 63–60 | 17–13 | Davey Whitney Complex (1,942); Lorman, MS |
| 03/10/17; 8:30 pm | (2) | vs. (3) Southern; Semifinals | W 81–59 | 18–13 | Toyota Center; Houston, TX |
| 03/11/17; 8:30 pm | (2) | vs. (1) Texas Southern; Championship | L 50–53 | 18–14 | Toyota Center; Houston, TX |
*Non-conference game. ^{#}Rankings from AP Poll. (#) Tournament seedings in parentheses. All times are in Central Time.
