= 2017 SWAC men's basketball tournament =

- Classification: Division I
- Season: 2016–17
- Teams: 8
- Site: Toyota Center; Houston, Texas
- First round site: Campus sites
- Champions: Texas Southern (7th title)
- Winning coach: Mike Davis (3rd title)
- MVP: Marvin Jones (Texas Southern)

2016–17 SWAC men's basketball standings
	Conf.				Overall
Team	W		L	PCT	W		L	PCT
Texas Southern †	16	–	2	.889	23	–	12	.657
Alcorn State*	13	–	5	.722	18	–	14	.563
Grambling State	10	–	8	.556	16	–	17	.485
Jackson State	10	–	8	.556	14	–	18	.438
Southern	10	–	8	.556	15	–	18	.455
Prairie View A&M	10	–	8	.556	13	–	20	.394
Mississippi Valley State	7	–	11	.389	7	–	25	.219
Alabama State	6	–	12	.333	8	–	23	.258
Arkansas–Pine Bluff	6	–	12	.333	7	–	25	.219
Alabama A&M	2	–	16	.111	2	–	27	.069
*ineligible for postseason due to APR violations
† 2017 SWAC tournament winner

The 2017 SWAC men's basketball tournament was the postseason men's basketball tournament for the Southwestern Athletic Conference. Tournament first-round games were played at the campus of the higher seeded team on March 7. The remainder of the tournament was held on March 10 and 11, 2017 at the Toyota Center in Houston, Texas. Texas Southern, received the conference's automatic bid to the NCAA tournament. Alcorn State lost to Texas Southern in the championship game, but was ineligible for NCAA postseason play due to APR violations. Had Alcorn State beaten Texas Southern, Texas Southern would have still received the conference's automatic bid to the NCAA Tournament because of its first place finish in the regular season.

== Seeds ==
The top eight teams competed in the conference tournament. Teams were seeded by record within the conference, with a tiebreaker system to seed teams with identical conference records.

Seed	School	Conference	Tiebreaker	Tiebreaker 2
1	Texas Southern	16–2		
2	Alcorn State	13–5		
3	Southern	10–8	4–2 vs. Gram/Jack/PV A&M	
4	Prairie View A&M	10–8	3–3 vs. Sou/Gram/Jack	+9 point differential vs. Gram
5	Grambling State	10–8	3–3 vs. Sou/Jack/PV A&M	–9 point differential vs. PV A&M
6	Jackson State	10–8	2–4 vs. Sou/Gram/PV A&M	
7	Mississippi Valley St.	7–11		
8	Alabama State	6–12	1–1 vs. UAPB	4 point differential vs. UAPB

== Schedule and results ==
Game	Time	Matchup	Score
Quarterfinals – Tuesday, March 7 – campus sites
1	7:30 pm	No. 8 Alabama State at No. 1 Texas Southern	87–72
2	8:00 pm	No. 5 Grambling State at No. 4 Prairie View A&M	81–77
3	7:30 pm	No. 6 Jackson State at No. 3 Southern	69–63
4	6:00 pm	No. 7 Mississippi Valley State at No. 2 Alcorn State	63–60
Semifinals – Friday, March 10 – Toyota Center, Houston, TX
5	2:30 pm	No. 5 Grambling State vs No. 1 Texas Southern	62–57
6	8:30 pm	No. 3 Southern vs No. 2 Alcorn State	81–59
Final – Saturday, March 11 – Toyota Center, Houston, TX
7	3:00 pm	No. 2 Alcorn State vs No. 1 Texas Southern	53–50
*Game times in CST. Rankings denote tournament seed

== Bracket ==
Quarterfinals; March 7
1	Texas Southern	87
8	Alabama State	72
4	Prairie View A&M	77
5	Grambling State	81
2	Alcorn State	63
7	Mississippi Valley State	60
3	Southern	69
6	Jackson State	63

Semifinals; March 10
1	Texas Southern	62
5	Grambling State	57
2	Alcorn State	81
3	Southern	59

Championship; March 11
1	Texas Southern	53
2	Alcorn State	50

First round games at campus sites of lower-numbered seeds
