= 2016–17 Arkansas–Pine Bluff Golden Lions men's basketball team =

American college basketball season

2016–17 Arkansas–Pine Bluff Golden Lions men's basketball
- Conference: Southwestern Athletic Conference
- Record: 7–25 (6–12 SWAC)
- Head coach: George Ivory (9th season)
- Assistant coaches: Kenneth Broyles; Jarvis Gunter; Richard "Dell" Cannon
- Home arena: K. L. Johnson Complex

2016–17 SWAC men's basketball standings
	Conf.				Overall
Team	W		L	PCT	W		L	PCT
Texas Southern †	16	–	2	.889	23	–	12	.657
Alcorn State*	13	–	5	.722	18	–	14	.563
Grambling State	10	–	8	.556	16	–	17	.485
Jackson State	10	–	8	.556	14	–	18	.438
Southern	10	–	8	.556	15	–	18	.455
Prairie View A&M	10	–	8	.556	13	–	20	.394
Mississippi Valley State	7	–	11	.389	7	–	25	.219
Alabama State	6	–	12	.333	8	–	23	.258
Arkansas–Pine Bluff	6	–	12	.333	7	–	25	.219
Alabama A&M	2	–	16	.111	2	–	27	.069
† 2017 SWAC tournament winner *ineligible for postseason due to APR violations

The 2016–17 Arkansas–Pine Bluff Golden Lions men's basketball team represented the University of Arkansas at Pine Bluff during the 2016–17 NCAA Division I men's basketball season. The Golden Lions, led by ninth-year head coach George Ivory, played their home games at the K. L. Johnson Complex as members of the Southwestern Athletic Conference. They finished the season 7–25, 6–12 in SWAC play to finish in a tie for eighth place. They did not qualify for the SWAC tournament.

== Previous season ==
The Golden Lions finished the 2015–16 season 8–25, 6–12 record in SWAC play to finish in a three-way tie for seventh place. They lost to Alabama A&M in the first round of the SWAC tournament.

== Roster ==
2016–17 Arkansas–Pine Bluff Golden Lions men's basketball team
Players
Coaches

Pos.	#	Name	Height	Weight	Year	Hometown
G/F	1	Charles Jackson	6 ft 5 in (1.96 m)	210 lb (95 kg)	So	Cleveland, Mississippi
G	3	Kennedy McKinney	6 ft 3 in (1.91 m)	170 lb (77 kg)	Jr	Memphis, Tennessee
G	10	Jaquan Lynch	6 ft 3 in (1.91 m)	180 lb (82 kg)	Sr	Brooklyn, New York
F/C	12	Marquis Cunningham	6 ft 8 in (2.03 m)	200 lb (91 kg)	Sr	Bronx, New York
G	13	Joe'Randle Toliver	6 ft 4 in (1.93 m)	180 lb (82 kg)	Jr	Jonesboro, Arkansas
G	14	Marcus Wallace	6 ft 1 in (1.85 m)	180 lb (82 kg)	So	Jackson, Mississippi
F	15	Trent Steen	6 ft 8 in (2.03 m)	225 lb (102 kg)	Jr	Forrest City, Arkansas
F/C	21	Artavious McDyess	6 ft 10 in (2.08 m)	215 lb (98 kg)	Fr	Columbus, Mississippi
G	22	Khalid Campbell	6 ft 1 in (1.85 m)	175 lb (79 kg)	Fr	Greenwood, Mississippi
F	25	Cedric Turner	6 ft 8 in (2.03 m)	250 lb (113 kg)	Fr	Houston, Texas
F	34	Devin Berry	6 ft 7 in (2.01 m)	220 lb (100 kg)	Sr	Columbus, Mississippi
F	35	Travon Harper	6 ft 8 in (2.03 m)	220 lb (100 kg)	Jr	McNeil, Arkansas
G	40	J'Breun Sprinkle	6 ft 2 in (1.88 m)	175 lb (79 kg)	So	White Hall, Arkansas
G	44	Ghiavonni Robinson	6 ft 3 in (1.91 m)	190 lb (86 kg)	Sr	Itta Bena, Mississippi
C	52	David Tillman	6 ft 10 in (2.08 m)	215 lb (98 kg)	RS Jr	Houston, Texas

Head coach

- George Ivory (Mississippi Valley State)

Assistant coach(es)

- Kenneth Broyles
- Jarvis Gunter
- Richard "Dell" Cannon

Legend

- (C) Team captain
- (S) Suspended
- (I) Ineligible
- (W) Walk-on
- Injured
- Current redshirt

Roster

== Schedule and results ==
Date time, TV	Opponent	Result	Record	Site (attendance) city, state
Exhibition
11/04/2016*; 7:00 pm	Champion Baptist	W 99–56		K. L. Johnson Complex; Pine Bluff, AR
Non-conference regular season
11/11/2016*; 7:00 pm	at UAB; CBE Hall of Fame Classic – Campus Game	L 66–86	0–1	Bartow Arena (4,289); Birmingham, AL
11/14/2016*; 7:00 pm	Ecclesia	W 83–47	1–1	K. L. Johnson Complex (575); Pine Bluff, AR
11/17/2016*; 6:00 pm	at George Washington; CBE Hall of Fame Classic – Campus Game	L 41–61	1–2	Charles E. Smith Center (2,013); Washington, D.C.
11/21/2016*; 5:00 pm	Blue Mountain	L 74–77 ^{3OT}	1–3	K. L. Johnson Complex (675); Pine Bluff, AR
11/23/2016*; 7:00 pm, ESPN3	at Siena; CBE Hall of Fame Classic – Campus Game	L 43–66	1–4	Times Union Center (5,252); Albany, NY
11/27/2016*; 11:00 pm	at Hawaii	L 44–64	1–5	Stan Sheriff Center (5,508); Honolulu, HI
12/01/2016*; 7:00 pm	UT Martin	L 68–73	1–6	K. L. Johnson Complex (678); Pine Bluff, AR
12/03/2016*; 3:30 pm, ESPN3	at Central Michigan	L 59–82	1–7	McGuirk Arena (2,491); Mount Pleasant, MI
12/08/2016*; 6:30 pm	at Little Rock	W 67–52	1–8	Jack Stephens Center (2,756); Little Rock, AR
12/12/2016*; 7:00 pm	at Seattle	L 58–63	1–9	Connolly Center (747); Seattle, WA
12/14/2016*; 8:00 pm, ESPNU	at Oklahoma State	L 66–102	1–10	Gallagher-Iba Arena (5,287); Stillwater, OK
12/17/2016*; 7:00 pm	at New Mexico	L 43–83	1–11	The Pit (10,404); Albuquerque, NM
12/19/2016*; 8:00 pm	at Denver	L 52–74	1–12	Magness Arena (954); Denver, CO
12/22/2016*; 8:00 pm, ESPN3	at Grand Canyon	L 49–89	1–13	GCU Arena (5,642); Phoenix, AZ
SWAC regular season
01/02/2017; 7:30 pm	Mississippi Valley State	W 105–91	2–13 (1–0)	K. L. Johnson Complex (765); Pine Bluff, AR
01/07/2017; 7:30 pm	Alabama State	W 71–63	3–13 (2–0)	K. L. Johnson Complex (650); Pine Bluff, AR
01/09/2017; 7:30 pm	Alabama A&M	W 81–65	4–13 (3–0)	K. L. Johnson Complex (705); Pine Bluff, AR
01/14/2017; 5:30 pm	at Southern	L 75–76	4–14 (3–1)	F. G. Clark Center (741); Baton Rouge, LA
01/16/2017; 7:30 pm	Alcorn State	L 64–82	4–15 (3–2)	Davey Whitney Complex (948); Lorman, MS
01/21/2017; 7:30 pm	Texas Southern	L 63–70	4–16 (3–3)	K. L. Johnson Complex (1,845); Pine Bluff, AR
01/23/2017; 7:30 pm	Prairie View A&M	W 71–68 ^{2OT}	5–16 (4–3)	K. L. Johnson Complex (1,654); Pine Bluff, AR
01/28/2017; 7:30 pm	at Grambling State	L 53–61	5–17 (4–4)	Fredrick C. Hobdy Assembly Center; Grambling, LA
01/30/2017; 7:30 pm	at Jackson State	L 59–74	5–18 (4–5)	Williams Assembly Center; Jackson, MS
02/04/2017; 7:30 pm	at Alabama State	L 65–77	5–19 (4–6)	Dunn–Oliver Acadome (1,343); Montgomery, AL
02/06/2017; 7:30 pm	at Alabama A&M	W 65–49	6–19 (5–6)	Elmore Gymnasium (2,106); Normal, AL
02/11/2017; 7:30 pm	Southern	W 68–61	7–19 (6–6)	K. L. Johnson Complex (1,889); Pine Bluff, AR
02/13/2017; 7:30 pm	Alcorn State	L 58–70	7–20 (6–7)	K. L. Johnson Complex (1,348); Pine Bluff, AR
02/18/2017; 7:30 pm	at Texas Southern	L 40–78	7–21 (6–8)	Health and Physical Education Arena (1,215); Houston, TX
02/20/2017; 7:30 pm	at Prairie View A&M	L 55–73	7–22 (6–9)	William J. Nicks Building (1,273); Prairie View, TX
02/25/2017; 7:30 pm	Grambling State	L 58–78	7–23 (6–10)	K. L. Johnson Complex (2,345); Pine Bluff, AR
02/27/2017; 7:30 pm	Jackson State	L 51–62	7–24 (6–11)	K. L. Johnson Complex (1,268); Pine Bluff, AR
03/04/2017; 7:30 pm	at Mississippi Valley State	L 77–88	7–25 (6–12)	Harrison HPER Complex (2,019); Itta Bena, MS
*Non-conference game. ^{#}Rankings from AP Poll. (#) Tournament seedings in parentheses. All times are in Central Time Source.
