= 2016–17 Alabama A&M Bulldogs basketball team =

American college basketball season

2016–17 Alabama A&M Bulldogs basketball
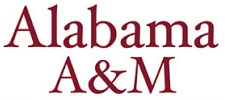
- Conference: Southwestern Athletic Conference
- Record: 2–27 (2–16 SWAC)
- Head coach: Willie Hayes (6th season)
- Assistant coaches: Mike Smith; Ondray Wagner
- Home arena: Elmore Gymnasium

2016–17 SWAC men's basketball standings
	Conf.				Overall
Team	W		L	PCT	W		L	PCT
Texas Southern †	16	–	2	.889	23	–	12	.657
Alcorn State*	13	–	5	.722	18	–	14	.563
Grambling State	10	–	8	.556	16	–	17	.485
Jackson State	10	–	8	.556	14	–	18	.438
Southern	10	–	8	.556	15	–	18	.455
Prairie View A&M	10	–	8	.556	13	–	20	.394
Mississippi Valley State	7	–	11	.389	7	–	25	.219
Alabama State	6	–	12	.333	8	–	23	.258
Arkansas–Pine Bluff	6	–	12	.333	7	–	25	.219
Alabama A&M	2	–	16	.111	2	–	27	.069
† 2017 SWAC tournament winner *ineligible for postseason due to APR violations

The 2016–17 Alabama A&M Bulldogs basketball team represented Alabama A&M University during the 2016–17 NCAA Division I men's basketball season. The Bulldogs, led by sixth-year head coach Willie Hayes, played their home games at the Elmore Gymnasium in Normal, Alabama and were members of the Southwestern Athletic Conference. They finished the season 2–27, 2–16 in SWAC play to finish in last place. They did not qualify for the SWAC tournament.

On March 7, head coach Willie Hayes resigned. He finished at Alabama A&M with a six year record of 54–121. On April 12, the school named Texas Southern assistant and former Florida International head coach Donnie Marsh the new head coach.

== Previous season ==
The Bulldogs finished the 2015–16 season 11–18, 6–12 record in SWAC play to finish in a three-way tie for seventh place. They beat Arkansas–Pine Bluff in the first round of the SWAC tournament before losing to Texas Southern in the quarterfinals.

== Roster ==
2016–17 Alabama A&M Bulldogs men's basketball team
Players
Coaches

Pos.	#	Name	Height	Weight	Year	Hometown
G	2	Christopher Thomas	6 ft 7 in (2.01 m)	180 lb (82 kg)	Sr	Alabaster, Alabama
G	3	De'Ederick Petty	6 ft 1 in (1.85 m)	170 lb (77 kg)	Fr	Bessemer, Alabama
G	4	Ariston Johnson	6 ft 1 in (1.85 m)	185 lb (84 kg)	Fr	Alexandria, Virginia
G	10	Rakiya Battle	6 ft 1 in (1.85 m)	170 lb (77 kg)	Sr	Harvest, Alabama
G	11	Matthew Cotton	5 ft 10 in (1.78 m)	185 lb (84 kg)	Sr	Atlanta, Georgia
G	12	Marcus Merriweather	6 ft 0 in (1.83 m)	185 lb (84 kg)	Sr	Pinson, Alabama
G	20	L'Quan Wiltshire	6 ft 0 in (1.83 m)	190 lb (86 kg)	Jr	Atlanta, Georgia
F	22	Eugene Jones Jr.	6 ft 6 in (1.98 m)	220 lb (100 kg)	So	Belleville, Illinois
F	24	Evan Wiley	6 ft 6 in (1.98 m)	190 lb (86 kg)	Fr	Huntsville, Alabama
F	30	Adrian Edwards	6 ft 4 in (1.93 m)	195 lb (88 kg)	Sr	Meridian, Mississippi
F	35	Tracy Burnett	6 ft 5 in (1.96 m)	230 lb (104 kg)	Jr	Huntsville, Alabama
G	41	Reginald Miller	6 ft 4 in (1.93 m)	175 lb (79 kg)	Fr	Montgomery, Alabama
F/C	42	Quinterian McConico	6 ft 8 in (2.03 m)	235 lb (107 kg)	Sr	Birmingham, Alabama
F/C	44	Mohamed Sherif	6 ft 8 in (2.03 m)	225 lb (102 kg)	So	Philadelphia, Pennsylvania

Head coach

- Willie Hayes (Alabama A&M)

Assistant coach(es)

- Mike Smith (New Orleans)
- Ondray Wagner (Alabama A&M)

Legend

- (C) Team captain
- (S) Suspended
- (I) Ineligible
- (W) Walk-on
- Injured
- Current redshirt

Roster

== Schedule and results ==
Date time, TV	Opponent	Result	Record	Site (attendance) city, state
Non-conference regular season
11/11/2016*; 7:05 pm, ESPN3	at Missouri State	L 62–96	0–1	JQH Arena (3,502); Springfield, MO
11/13/2016*; 7:00 pm, SEC Network	at Missouri	L 44–99	0–2	Mizzou Arena (3,977); Columbia, MO
11/17/2016*; 7:30 pm	at Tennessee Tech	L 61–95	0–3	Eblen Center (1,396); Cookeville, TN
11/21/2016*; 7:00 pm	at Southern Miss	L 55–63	0–4	Reed Green Coliseum (2,202); Hattiesburg, MS
11/26/2016*; 7:00 pm	at Murray State	L 54–91	0–5	CFSB Center (2,401); Murray, KY
11/29/2016*; 7:00 pm	at UAB	L 45–75	0–6	Bartow Arena (3,719); Birmingham, AL
12/03/2016*; 6:00 pm	Tennessee Tech	L 74–79	0–7	Elmore Gymnasium (1,735); Normal, AL
12/10/2016*; 2:00 pm	at Troy	L 59–88	0–8	Trojan Arena (765); Troy, AL
12/14/2016*; 7:00 pm, ESPN3	at Georgia State	L 79–94	0–9	GSU Sports Arena (1,183); Atlanta, GA
12/22/2016*; 11:00 am, ESPN3	at Bowling Green	L 61–74	0–10	Stroh Center (1,338); Waco, TX
12/29/2016*; 7:00 pm, ESPN3	at Western Michigan	L 50–80	0–11	University Arena (2,260); Kalamazoo, MI
SWAC regular season
01/02/2017; 7:30 pm	Jackson State	L 51–63	0–12 (0–1)	Elmore Gymnasium (1,487); Normal, AL
01/04/2017; 7:30 pm	Grambling State	L 67–79	0–13 (0–2)	Elmore Gymnasium; Normal, AL
01/07/2017; 4:00 pm	at Mississippi Valley State	W 79–76	1–13 (1–2)	Harrison HPER Complex (2,008); Itta Bena, MS
01/09/2017; 7:30 pm	at Arkansas–Pine Bluff	L 65–81	1–14 (1–3)	K. L. Johnson Complex (705); Pine Bluff, AR
01/14/2017; 6:00 pm	Alabama State	L 55–57	1–15 (1–4)	Elmore Gymnasium (3,320); Normal, AL
01/21/2017; 6:00 pm	Southern	L 52–53	1–16 (1–5)	Elmore Gymnasium (2,123); Normal, AL
01/23/2017; 7:30 pm	Alcorn State	L 70–81	1–17 (1–6)	Elmore Gymnasium (1,822); Normal, AL
01/28/2017; 6:00 pm	at Prairie View A&M	L 65–70	1–18 (1–7)	William J. Nicks Building (824); Prairie View, TX
01/30/2017; 7:30 pm	at Texas Southern	L 47–92	1–19 (1–8)	Health and Physical Education Arena (1,038); Houston, TX
02/04/2017; 6:00 pm	Mississippi Valley State	L 66–68	1–20 (1–9)	Elmore Gymnasium (1,965); Normal, AL
02/06/2017; 7:30 pm	Arkansas–Pine Bluff	L 49–65	1–21 (1–10)	Elmore Gymnasium (2,106); Normal, AL
02/11/2017; 5:00 pm	at Alabama State	L 89–97 ^{3OT}	1–22 (1–11)	Dunn–Oliver Acadome (6,285); Montgomery, AL
02/18/2017; 6:00 pm	at Southern	L 64–77	1–23 (1–12)	F. G. Clark Center (975); Baton Rouge, LA
02/20/2017; 7:30 pm	at Alcorn State	L 59–74	1–24 (1–13)	Davey Whitney Complex (718); Lorman, MS
02/25/2017; 6:00 pm	Prairie View A&M	W 87–74	2–24 (2–13)	Elmore Gymnasium (1,578); Normal, AL
02/27/2017; 7:30 pm	Texas Southern	L 64–74	2–25 (2–14)	Elmore Gymnasium; Normal, AL
03/02/2017; 7:30 pm	at Jackson State	L 64–72	2–26 (2–15)	Williams Assembly Center; Jackson, MS
03/04/2017; 6:00 pm	at Grambling State	L 57–78	2–27 (2–16)	Fredrick C. Hobdy Assembly Center (579); Grambling, LA
*Non-conference game. ^{#}Rankings from AP Poll. (#) Tournament seedings in parentheses. All times are in Central Time Source.
