= 2016–17 Texas Southern Tigers basketball team =

American college basketball season

2016–17 Texas Southern Tigers basketball
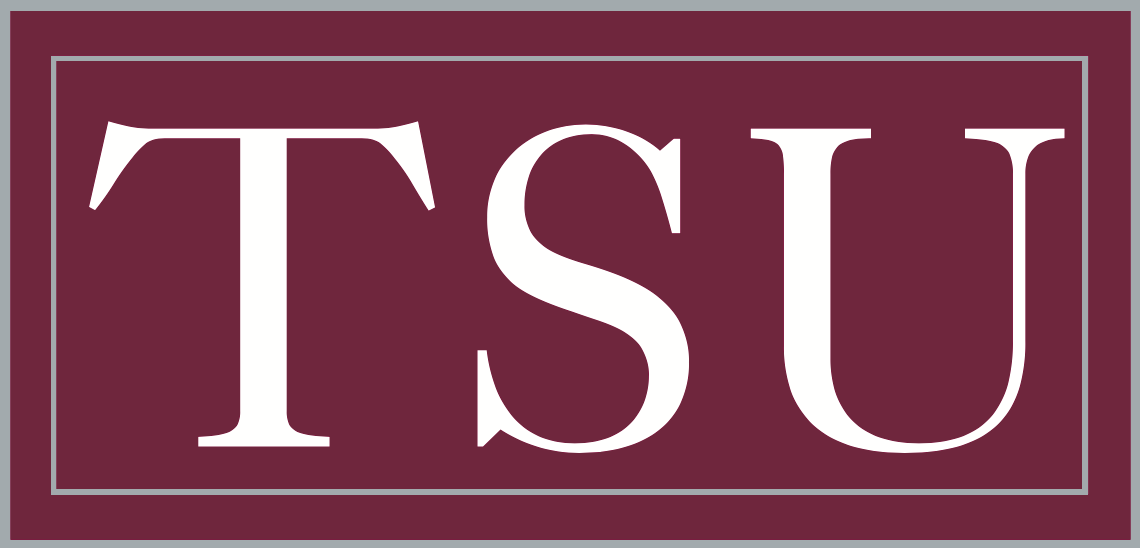

SWAC regular season and tournament champions

NCAA tournament, First Round
- Conference: Southwestern Athletic Conference
- Record: 23–12 (16–2 SWAC)
- Head coach: Mike Davis (5th season)
- Associate head coach: Donnie Marsh
- Assistant coaches: Michael Davis, Jr.; J. Keith LeGree
- Home arena: Health and Physical Education Arena

2016–17 SWAC men's basketball standings
	Conf.				Overall
Team	W		L	PCT	W		L	PCT
Texas Southern †	16	–	2	.889	23	–	12	.657
Alcorn State*	13	–	5	.722	18	–	14	.563
Grambling State	10	–	8	.556	16	–	17	.485
Jackson State	10	–	8	.556	14	–	18	.438
Southern	10	–	8	.556	15	–	18	.455
Prairie View A&M	10	–	8	.556	13	–	20	.394
Mississippi Valley State	7	–	11	.389	7	–	25	.219
Alabama State	6	–	12	.333	8	–	23	.258
Arkansas–Pine Bluff	6	–	12	.333	7	–	25	.219
Alabama A&M	2	–	16	.111	2	–	27	.069
† 2017 SWAC tournament winner *ineligible for postseason due to APR violations

The 2016–17 Texas Southern Tigers basketball team represented Texas Southern University during the 2016–17 NCAA Division I men's basketball season. The Tigers, led by fifth year head coach Mike Davis, played their home games at the Health and Physical Education Arena in Houston, Texas as members of the Southwestern Athletic Conference. They finished the season 23–12, 16–2 in SWAC play to win the regular season SWAC championship. They defeated Alabama State, Grambling State, and Alcorn State to be champions of the SWAC tournament. They earned the SWAC's automatic bid to the NCAA tournament where they lost in the first round to North Carolina.

== Previous season ==
The Tigers finished the 2015–16 season 18–15, 16–2 in SWAC play to win the regular season SWAC championship. They defeated Alabama A&M in the quarterfinals of the SWAC tournament to advance to the semifinals where they lost to Southern. As regular season conference champions who failed to win their conference tournament, they received an automatic bid to the National Invitation Tournament where they lost to Valparaiso in the first round.

== Roster ==
2016–17 Texas Southern Tigers men's basketball team
Players
Coaches

Pos.	#	Name	Height	Weight	Year	Hometown
G	1	Jalan McCloud	5 ft 10 in (1.78 m)	160 lb (73 kg)	Jr	Fort Worth, TX
G	2	Zach Lofton	6 ft 3 in (1.91 m)	180 lb (82 kg)	RS Jr	St. Paul, MN
G	3	Demontrae Jefferson	5 ft 7 in (1.7 m)	150 lb (68 kg)	Fr	Milwaukee, WI
G	4	Kevin Scott	6 ft 4 in (1.93 m)	190 lb (86 kg)	Jr	Omaha, NE
G	5	Ty Bynum	5 ft 9 in (1.75 m)	160 lb (73 kg)	Sr	Philadelphia, PA
G	11	Brian Carey	5 ft 9 in (1.75 m)	160 lb (73 kg)	So	Denver, CO
G	12	Dulani Robinson	5 ft 8 in (1.73 m)	175 lb (79 kg)	Sr	Oakland, CA
F	14	Lamont Walker	6 ft 6 in (1.98 m)	210 lb (95 kg)	Jr	Chicago, IL
G	15	Cainan McClelland	6 ft 2 in (1.88 m)	155 lb (70 kg)	Fr	Houston, TX
G	20	Jerron Martin	6 ft 0 in (1.83 m)	175 lb (79 kg)	RS Jr	Prince George's County, MD
F	23	Derrick Griffin	6 ft 7 in (2.01 m)	220 lb (100 kg)	RS So	Houston, TX
C	24	Marvin Jones	7 ft 0 in (2.13 m)	220 lb (100 kg)	GS	Chicago, IL
F	25	Jamie Rutherford	6 ft 8 in (2.03 m)	240 lb (109 kg)	Jr	Indianapolis, IN
F	33	Kevin Granger Jr.	6 ft 5 in (1.96 m)	180 lb (82 kg)	Fr	Houston, TX
F	40	Stephan Bennett	6 ft 10 in (2.08 m)	230 lb (104 kg)	GS	Lake Station, IN
F	44	Eric Washington	6 ft 4 in (1.93 m)	210 lb (95 kg)	Sr	Birmingham, AL
G		Divonte Lumpkin	6 ft 1 in (1.85 m)	170 lb (77 kg)	RS Fr	Chicago, IL
C		Trayvon Reed	7 ft 2 in (2.18 m)	230 lb (104 kg)	RS So	Mobile, AL

Head coach

- Mike Davis (Alabama)

Assistant coach(es)

- Michael Davis, Jr.
- J. Keith LeGree

Legend

- (C) Team captain
- (S) Suspended
- (I) Ineligible
- (W) Walk-on
- Injured
- Current redshirt

== Schedule and results ==
Date time, TV	Rank^{#}	Opponent^{#}	Result	Record	Site (attendance) city, state
Non-conference regular season
11/12/16*; 7:30 pm		at Texas–Arlington	L 82–89	0–1	College Park Center (4,532); Arlington, TX
11/13/16*; 1:00 pm		at Delaware State	W 74–61	1–1	Memorial Hall (942); Dover, DE
11/16/16*; 7:00 pm		Rice	W 71–68	2–1	H&PE Arena (2,082); Houston, TX
11/19/16*; 7:00 pm		at La Salle	W 77–76	3–1	Tom Gola Arena (2,622); Philadelphia, PA
11/21/16*; 6:00 pm		at James Madison	W 67–56	4–1	James Madison University Convocation Center (2,311); Harrisonburg, VA
11/27/16*; 6:00 pm		at Louisiana-Lafayette	L 73–84	4–2	Blackham Coliseum (3,027); Lafayette, LA
11/30/16*; 9:00 pm		at No. 16 Arizona	L 63–85	4–3	McKale Center (14,410); Tucson, AZ
12/03/16*; 4:00 pm		at Southern Illinois	L 70–74	4–4	SIU Arena (4,472); Carbondale, IL
12/10/16*; 1:00 pm		at No. 11 Louisville	L 71–102	4–5	Yum Center (18,152); Louisville, KY
12/13/16*; 6:00 pm		at No. 25 Cincinnati	L 58–96	4–6	Fifth Third Arena (6,612); Cincinnati, OH
12/17/16*; 5:00 pm		at LSU	L 80–88	4–7	Maravich Assembly Center (7,222); Baton Rouge, LA
12/18/16*; 5:00 pm		at TCU	L 59–96	4–8	Schollmaier Arena (6,081); Waco, TX
12/21/16*; 6:30 pm		at No. 4 Baylor	L 63–89	4–9	Ferrell Center (5,347); Waco, TX
SWAC regular season
01/02/17; 7:00 pm		at Alcorn State	W 67–65	5–9 (1–0)	Davey Whitney Complex (221); Lorman, MS
01/04/17; 7:30 pm		at Southern	W 82–74	6–9 (2–0)	F. G. Clark Center (622); Baton Rouge, LA
01/07/17; 7:30 pm		at Prairie View	W 87–82	7–9 (3–0)	William Nicks Building (672); Prairie View, TX
01/14/17; 7:30 pm		Grambling State	W 76–55	8–9 (4–0)	Health and Physical Education Arena (1,017); Houston, TX
01/16/17; 7:30 pm, ESPN3		Jackson State	W 67–44	9–9 (5–0)	Health and Physical Education Arena; Houston, TX
01/21/17; 7:30 pm		at Arkansas–Pine Bluff	W 70–63	10–9 (6–0)	K.L. Johnson Complex (1,845); Pine Bluff, AR
01/23/17; 7:30 pm		at Mississippi Valley State	L 89–103	10–10 (6–1)	Harrison HPER Complex (3,985); Itta Bena, MS
01/28/17; 7:30 pm		Alabama State	W 70–68	11–10 (7–1)	Health and Physical Education Arena (1,022); Houston, TX
01/30/17; 7:30 pm		Alabama A&M	W 92–47	12–10 (8–1)	Health and Physical Education Arena (1,038); Houston, TX
02/04/17; 7:30 pm		Prairie View A&M	W 74–61	13–10 (9–1)	Health and Physical Education Arena (7,235); Houston, TX
02/11/17; 5:30 pm		at Grambling State	W 77–70	14–10 (10–1)	Fredrick C. Hobdy Assembly Center (679); Grambling, LA
02/13/17; 5:30 pm		at Jackson State	L 62–71	14–11 (10–2)	Williams Assembly Center; Jackson, MS
02/18/17; 7:30 pm		Arkansas–Pine Bluff	W 78–40	15–11 (11–2)	Health and Physical Education Arena (1,215); Houston, TX
02/20/17; 7:30 pm		Mississippi Valley State	W 92–61	16–11 (12–2)	Health and Physical Education Arena (1,012); Houston, TX
02/25/17; 5:00 pm		at Alabama State	W 86–73	17–11 (13–2)	Dunn–Oliver Acadome (2,997); Montgomery, AL
02/27/17; 7:30 pm		at Alabama A&M	W 74–64	18–11 (14–2)	Elmore Gymnasium; Normal, AL
03/02/17; 7:30 pm		Alcorn State	W 94–88 ^{OT}	19–11 (15–2)	Health and Physical Education Arena (2,976); Houston, TX
03/04/17; 7:30 pm		Southern	W 82–69	20–11 (16–2)	Health and Physical Education Arena (3,902); Houston, TX
SWAC tournament
03/07/17; 7:30 pm	(1)	(8) Alabama State; Quarterfinals	W 87–72	21–11	Health and Physical Education Arena (3,487); Houston, TX
03/10/17; 2:30 pm	(1)	(5) Grambling State; Semifinals	W 62–57	22–11	Toyota Center; Houston, TX
03/10/17; 5:15 pm, ESPNU	(1)	(2) Alcorn State; Championship	W 53–50	23–11	Toyota Center; Houston, TX
NCAA tournament
03/17/17*; 4:00 pm, TNT	(16 S)	vs. (1 S) No. 6 North Carolina; First Round	L 64–103	23–12	Bon Secours Wellness Arena (14,179); Greenville, SC
*Non-conference game. ^{#}Rankings from AP Poll. (#) Tournament seedings in parentheses. S=South. All times are in Central Time. Source
