= 2016–17 Mississippi Valley State Delta Devils basketball team =

American college basketball season

2016–17 Mississippi Valley State Delta Devils basketball
- Conference: Southwestern Athletic Conference
- Record: 7–25 (7–11 SWAC)
- Head coach: Andre Payne (3rd season)
- Assistant coaches: Eric Strothers; Adaiah Curry
- Home arena: Harrison HPER Complex

2016–17 SWAC men's basketball standings
	Conf.				Overall
Team	W		L	PCT	W		L	PCT
Texas Southern †	16	–	2	.889	23	–	12	.657
Alcorn State*	13	–	5	.722	18	–	14	.563
Grambling State	10	–	8	.556	16	–	17	.485
Jackson State	10	–	8	.556	14	–	18	.438
Southern	10	–	8	.556	15	–	18	.455
Prairie View A&M	10	–	8	.556	13	–	20	.394
Mississippi Valley State	7	–	11	.389	7	–	25	.219
Alabama State	6	–	12	.333	8	–	23	.258
Arkansas–Pine Bluff	6	–	12	.333	7	–	25	.219
Alabama A&M	2	–	16	.111	2	–	27	.069
† 2017 SWAC tournament winner *ineligible for postseason due to APR violations

The 2016–17 Mississippi Valley State Delta Devils basketball team represented Mississippi Valley State University in the 2016–17 NCAA Division I men's basketball season. The Delta Devils, led by third-year head coach Andre Payne, played their home games at the Harrison HPER Complex in Itta Bena, Mississippi as members of the Southwestern Athletic Conference (SWAC). They finished the season 7–25, 7–11 in SWAC play, to finish in seventh place. As the No. 7 seed in the SWAC tournament, they lost to Alcorn State in the quarterfinals.

== Previous season ==
The Delta Devils finished the 2015–16 season 8–27, 6–12 in SWAC play, to finish in a three-way tie for seventh place. They defeated Grambling State and Alcorn State to advance to the semifinals of the SWAC tournament where they lost to Jackson State.

== Roster ==
2016–17 Mississippi Valley State Delta Devils men's basketball team
Players
Coaches

Pos.	#	Name	Height	Weight	Year	Hometown
F	0	Vacha Vaughn	6 ft 4 in (1.93 m)	210 lb (95 kg)	Sr	Memphis, TN
G	1	Marcus Romain	6 ft 2 in (1.88 m)	174 lb (79 kg)	Sr	Brooklyn, NY
F	2	Ronald Jr. Strother	6 ft 5 in (1.96 m)	175 lb (79 kg)	So	Birmingham, AL
G	3	Darrell Riley	5 ft 10 in (1.78 m)	155 lb (70 kg)	Fr	Milwaukee, WI
G	5	Rashaan Surles	6 ft 4 in (1.93 m)	175 lb (79 kg)	Sr	Flossmoor, IL
F	10	Ta'jay Henry	6 ft 4 in (1.93 m)	215 lb (98 kg)	Sr	Queens, NY
G	11	Kylan Phillips	5 ft 11 in (1.8 m)	164 lb (74 kg)	So	Memphis, TN
F	12	Lorenzo Hunt	6 ft 4 in (1.93 m)	195 lb (88 kg)	Fr	Memphis, TN
F	13	Jabari Alex	6 ft 4 in (1.93 m)	188 lb (85 kg)	Sr	Chicago, IL
F	15	Hasaan Buggs	6 ft 7 in (2.01 m)	195 lb (88 kg)	Jr	Chicago, IL
F	20	Jevon Smith	6 ft 4 in (1.93 m)	190 lb (86 kg)	Fr	Milwaukee, WI
F	21	Terence Traylor	6 ft 9 in (2.06 m)	217 lb (98 kg)	GS	Los Angeles, CA
F	22	Michael Matlock	6 ft 6 in (1.98 m)	221 lb (100 kg)	Sr	Memphis, TN
F	23	Amos Given	6 ft 4 in (1.93 m)	200 lb (91 kg)	Jr	Shreveport, LA
G	24	Isaac Williams	6 ft 4 in (1.93 m)	181 lb (82 kg)	Sr	Powder Springs, GA
F	33	Jamal Watson	6 ft 10 in (2.08 m)	214 lb (97 kg)	Jr	Long Beach, CA

Head coach

- Andre Payne

Assistant coach(es)

- Eric Strothers
- Adaiah Curry

Legend

- (C) Team captain
- (S) Suspended
- (I) Ineligible
- (W) Walk-on
- Injured
- Current redshirt

Roster
Last update: July 22, 2024

== Schedule and results ==
Date time, TV	Rank^{#}	Opponent^{#}	Result	Record	Site (attendance) city, state
Exhibition
November 5, 2016; 5:00 p.m.		Tougaloo; Lafayette Stribling Classic	W 101–74		Harrison HPER Complex; Itta Bena, MS
Non-conference regular season
November 11, 2016*; 7:00 p.m., BTN Plus		at Northwestern	L 63–94	0–1	Welsh-Ryan Arena (6,056); Evanston, IL
November 14, 2016*; 7:00 p.m.		at No. 19 West Virginia	L 66–107	0–2	WVU Coliseum (7,807); Morgantown, WV
November 16, 2016*; 7:00 p.m.		at Kent State	L 63–93	0–3	Memorial Athletic and Convocation Center (2,524); Kent, OH
November 18, 2016*; 7:00 p.m., BTN Plus		at No. 13 Michigan State	L 53–100	0–4	Breslin Center (14,797); East Lansing, MI
November 22, 2016*; 6:00 p.m.		vs. UMass Lowell; Indiana Classic	L 71–76	0–5	Vines Center (124); Lynchburg, VA
November 23, 2016*; 2:00 p.m.		at Liberty; Indiana Classic	L 55–70	0–6	Vines Center (1,176); Lynchburg, VA
November 26, 2016*; 1:30 p.m.		at IPFW	L 54–79	0–7	Allen County War Memorial Coliseum (1,789); Fort Wayne, IN
November 27, 2016*; 4:00 p.m.		at No. 3 Indiana	L 52–85	0–8	Bloomington, IN (17,222); Simon Skjodt Assembly Hall
December 1, 2016*; 8:00 p.m.		at No. 8 Gonzaga	L 63–97	0–9	McCarthey Athletic Center (6,000); Spokane, WA
December 15, 2016*; 7:00 p.m.		at Seattle	L 67–82	0–10	KeyArena (811); Seattle, WA
December 17, 2016*; 7:00 p.m.		at Grand Canyon	L 62–72	0–11	GCU Arena (5,926); Phoenix, AZ
December 20, 2016*; 6:00 p.m.		at Iowa State	L 60–88	0–12	Hilton Coliseum (13,692); Ames, IA
December 22, 2016*; 7:00 p.m.		at Drake	L 68–101	0–13	Knapp Center (2,268); Des Moines, IA
SWAC regular season
January 2, 2017; 7:30 p.m.		at Arkansas–Pine Bluff	L 91–105	0–14 (0–1)	K. L. Johnson Complex (765); Pine Bluff, AR
January 7, 2017; 4:00 p.m.		Alabama A&M	W 79–76	0–15 (0–2)	Harrison HPER Complex (2,008); Itta Bena, MS
January 9, 2017; 7:30 p.m.		Alabama State	W 73–70	1–15 (1–2)	Harrison HPER Complex (2,201); Itta Bena, MS
January 14, 2017; 5:00 p.m.		at Alcorn State	W 84–77	2–15 (2–2)	Davey Whitney Complex (1,538); Lorman, MS
January 16, 2017; 7:30 p.m.		at Southern	L 81–87	2–16 (2–3)	F. G. Clark Center (801); Baton Rouge, LA
January 21, 2017; 4:00 p.m.		Prairie View A&M	L 72–87	2–17 (2–4)	Harrison HPER Complex (4,087); Itta Bena, MS
January 23, 2017; 7:30 p.m.		Texas Southern	W 103–89	3–17 (3–4)	Harrison HPER Complex (3,985); Itta Bena, MS
January 28, 2017; 5:00 p.m.		at Jackson State	L 68–83	3–18 (3–5)	Williams Assembly Center; Jackson, MS
January 30, 2017; 7:30 p.m.		at Grambling State	L 74–77 ^{OT}	3–19 (3–6)	Fredrick C. Hobdy Assembly Center (673); Grambling, LA
February 4, 2017; 5:00 p.m.		at Alabama A&M	W 68–66	4–19 (4–6)	Elmore Gymnasium (1,965); Huntsville, AL
February 6, 2017; 7:30 p.m.		at Alabama State	L 66–71	4–20 (4–7)	Dunn–Oliver Acadome (1,263); Montgomery, AL
February 11, 2017; 4:00 p.m.		Alcorn State	L 77–88	4–21 (4–8)	Harrison HPER Complex (2,197); Itta Bena, MS
February 13, 2017; 7:30 p.m.		Southern	L 72–81	4–22 (4–9)	Harrison HPER Complex (1,309); Itta Bena, MS
February 18, 2017; 5:00 p.m.		at Prairie View A&M	L 69–82	4–23 (4–10)	William J. Nicks Building (976); Prairie View, TX
February 20, 2017; 7:30 p.m.		at Texas Southern	L 61–92	4–24 (4–11)	Health and Physical Education Arena (1,012); Houston, TX
February 25, 2017; 4:00 p.m.		Jackson State	W 70–67 ^{OT}	5–24 (5–11)	Harrison HPER Complex (2,052); Itta Bena, MS
February 27, 2017; 7:30 p.m.		Grambling State	W 84–80	6–24 (6–11)	Harrison HPER Complex (1,024); Itta Bena, MS
March 4, 2017; 4:00 p.m.		Arkansas–Pine Bluff	W 88–77	7–24 (7–11)	Harrison HPER Complex (2,019); Itta Bena, MS
SWAC tournament
March 7, 2017; 6:00 p.m.	(7)	at (2) Alcorn State; Quarterfinals	L 60–63	7–25	Davey Whitney Complex (1,942); Lorman, MS
*Non-conference game. ^{#}Rankings from AP poll. (#) Tournament seedings in parentheses. All times are in Central.
