= 2016–17 Southern Jaguars basketball team =

American college basketball season

2016–17 Southern Jaguars basketball
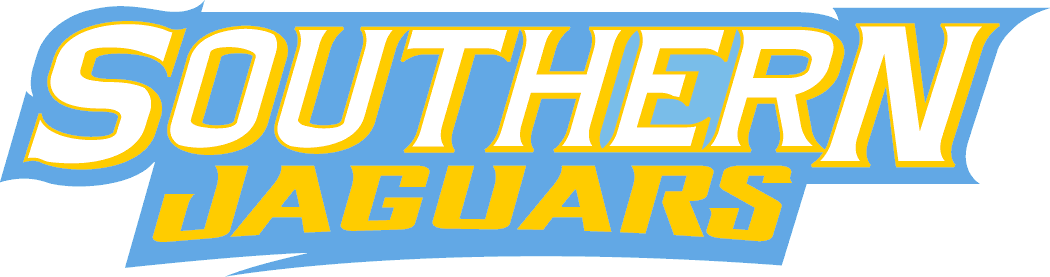
- Conference: Southwestern Athletic Conference
- Record: 15–18 (10–8 SWAC)
- Head coach: Roman Banks (6th season)
- Assistant coaches: Morris Scott; Rodney Kirschner; Pedro "Petey" Cipriano; Jethro Hillman
- Home arena: F. G. Clark Center

2016–17 SWAC men's basketball standings
	Conf.				Overall
Team	W		L	PCT	W		L	PCT
Texas Southern †	16	–	2	.889	23	–	12	.657
Alcorn State*	13	–	5	.722	18	–	14	.563
Grambling State	10	–	8	.556	16	–	17	.485
Jackson State	10	–	8	.556	14	–	18	.438
Southern	10	–	8	.556	15	–	18	.455
Prairie View A&M	10	–	8	.556	13	–	20	.394
Mississippi Valley State	7	–	11	.389	7	–	25	.219
Alabama State	6	–	12	.333	8	–	23	.258
Arkansas–Pine Bluff	6	–	12	.333	7	–	25	.219
Alabama A&M	2	–	16	.111	2	–	27	.069
† 2017 SWAC tournament winner *ineligible for postseason due to APR violations

The 2016–17 Southern Jaguars basketball team represented Southern University during the 2016–17 NCAA Division I men's basketball season. The Jaguars, led by sixth-year head coach Roman Banks, played their home games at the F. G. Clark Center in Baton Rouge, Louisiana as members of the Southwestern Athletic Conference. They finished the season 15–18, 10–8 in SWAC play to finish in a four-way tie for third place. As the 3-seed in the SWAC tournament they defeated Jackson State before losing in the semifinals to Alcorn State.

On March 31, head coach Roman Banks, who had been serving as Southern's interim Athletic Director for almost two years, was promoted to full time Athletic Director and stepped down as basketball coach. He finished his coaching career at Southern with a six year record of 114–85.

== Previous season ==
The Jaguars finished the 2015–16 season 22–13, 11–7 record in SWAC play to finish in fourth place. They defeated Alabama State, top-seeded Texas Southern, and Jackson State in the SWAC tournament to earn the conference's automatic bid to the NCAA tournament as a No. 16 seed. They lost to Holy Cross in the First Four.

== Roster ==
2016–17 Southern Jaguars men's basketball team
Players
Coaches

Pos.	#	Name	Height	Weight	Year	Hometown
G	0	Richard Lee	6 ft 4 in (1.93 m)	200 lb (91 kg)	Jr	Fort Lauderdale, Florida
G	1	LaQuentin Collins	6 ft 2 in (1.88 m)	170 lb (77 kg)	Jr	Monroe, Louisiana
F	2	Emanual Shepherd	6 ft 8 in (2.03 m)	200 lb (91 kg)	Jr	Toronto, Ontario, Canada
G	3	Tre'lun Banks	6 ft 1 in (1.85 m)	170 lb (77 kg)	Sr	Shreveport, Louisiana
G	4	Chris Thomas	6 ft 4 in (1.93 m)	190 lb (86 kg)	RS Jr	Baton Rouge, Louisiana
G	5	Brendon Ganaway	5 ft 10 in (1.78 m)	160 lb (73 kg)	RS Fr	Houston, Texas
F	10	Shawn Prudhomme	6 ft 4 in (1.93 m)	215 lb (98 kg)	Sr	Beaumont, Texas
G	11	Rashad Andrews	6 ft 5 in (1.96 m)	190 lb (86 kg)	Jr	Brooklyn, New York
F	12	Jared Sam	6 ft 9 in (2.06 m)	210 lb (95 kg)	Jr	Baton Rouge, Louisiana
F	21	Patrick Smith	6 ft 7 in (2.01 m)	195 lb (88 kg)	RS Jr	Bernice, Louisiana
G	22	JaMarcus Weatherspoon	6 ft 5 in (1.96 m)	190 lb (86 kg)	Sr	Baton Rouge, Louisiana
G	23	Josh Robinson	6 ft 4 in (1.93 m)	190 lb (86 kg)	Jr	Shreveport, Louisiana
G	30	DeRias Johnson	6 ft 4 in (1.93 m)	170 lb (77 kg)	RS Fr	Dallas, Texas
F	31	Isaiah Fontaine	6 ft 10 in (2.08 m)	200 lb (91 kg)	Fr	Boston, Massachusetts
C	33	Brandon Bolden	6 ft 11 in (2.11 m)	215 lb (98 kg)	GS	Sumter, South Carolina

Head coach

- Roman Banks (Northwestern State)

Assistant coach(es)

- Morris Scott (Florida A&M)
- Rodney Kirschner (Southeastern Louisiana)
- Pedro "Petey" Cipriano (Southern)
- Jethro Hillman (Miami (FL))

Legend

- (C) Team captain
- (S) Suspended
- (I) Ineligible
- (W) Walk-on
- Injured
- Current redshirt

Roster

== Schedule and results ==
Date time, TV	Rank^{#}	Opponent^{#}	Result	Record	Site (attendance) city, state
Non-conference regular season
11/12/2016*; 1:00 pm, ESPN3		at Ohio; Global Sports Shootout	L 67–77	0–1	Convocation Center (6,268); Athens, OH
11/14/2016*; 6:30 pm, ACCN Extra		at Georgia Tech; Global Sports Shootout	L 62–77	0–2	Hank McCamish Pavilion (4,360); Atlanta, GA
11/17/2016*; 6:30 pm		at Sam Houston State; Global Sports Shootout	L 83–91	0–3	Bernard Johnson Coliseum (1,116); Huntsville, TX
11/22/2016*; 7:30 pm		Tennessee Tech; Global Sports Shootout	W 80–68	1–3	F. G. Clark Center (601); Baton Rouge, LA
11/29/2016*; 7:00 pm		Paul Quinn	W 91–79	2–3	F. G. Clark Center (318); Baton Rouge, LA
12/03/2016*; 3:00 pm		at Florida A&M	W 83–71	3–3	Alfred Lawson, Jr. Multipurpose Center (1,017); Tallahassee, FL
12/07/2016*; 7:00 pm, ESPN3		at Tulane	L 75–84	3–4	Devlin Fieldhouse (1,107); New Orleans, LA
12/10/2016*; 3:00 pm		Loyola–New Orleans	L 64–69	3–5	F. G. Clark Center (288); Baton Rouge, LA
12/11/2016*; 3:00 pm		Ecclesia	W 86–50	4–5	F. G. Clark Center (121); Baton Rouge, LA
12/14/2016*; 6:00 pm, ESPNU		at No. 4 Baylor	L 59–89	4–6	Ferrell Center (5,091); Waco, TX
12/18/2016*; 4:00 pm		at UAB	L 74–75 ^{OT}	4–7	Bartow Arena (3,436); Birmingham, AL
12/20/2016*; 7:00 pm, BTN+		at Nebraska	L 76–81	4–8	Pinnacle Bank Arena (13,960); Lincoln, NE
12/28/2016*; 7:00 pm		Southeastern Louisiana	L 53–64	4–9	F. G. Clark Center (328); Baton Rouge, LA
SWAC regular season
01/02/2017; 7:30 pm		Prairie View A&M	W 59–57	5–9 (1–0)	F. G. Clark Center (463); Baton Rouge, LA
01/04/2017; 7:30 pm		Texas Southern	L 74–82	5–10 (1–1)	F. G. Clark Center (622); Baton Rouge, LA
01/07/2017; 5:00 pm		at Grambling State	W 87–79	6–10 (2–1)	Fredrick C. Hobdy Assembly Center (753); Grambling, LA
01/09/2017; 8:00 pm		at Jackson State	L 61–65	6–11 (2–2)	Williams Assembly Center (1,327); Jackson, MS
01/14/2017; 5:30 pm		Arkansas–Pine Bluff	W 76–75	7–11 (3–2)	F. G. Clark Center (741); Baton Rouge, LA
01/16/2017; 6:00 pm		Mississippi Valley State	W 87–81	8–11 (4–2)	F. G. Clark Center (801); Baton Rouge, LA
01/21/2017; 6:00 pm		at Alabama A&M	W 53–52	9–11 (5–2)	Elmore Gymnasium (2,123); Normal, AL
01/23/2017; 7:30 pm		at Alabama State	L 65–79	9–12 (5–3)	Dunn–Oliver Acadome (1,872); Montgomery, AL
01/28/2017; 5:00 pm		at Alcorn State	L 64–74	9–13 (5–4)	Davey Whitney Complex (1,443); Lorman, MS
02/04/2017; 5:30 pm		Grambling State	W 67–66	10–13 (6–4)	F. G. Clark Center (3,079); Baton Rouge, LA
02/06/2017; 8:00 pm, ESPNU		Jackson State	W 88–75	11–13 (7–4)	F. G. Clark Center (1,129); Baton Rouge, LA
02/11/2017; 7:30 pm		at Arkansas–Pine Bluff	L 61–68	11–14 (7–5)	K. L. Johnson Complex (1,889); Pine Bluff, AR
02/13/2017; 7:30 pm		at Mississippi Valley State	W 81–72	12–14 (8–5)	Harrison HPER Complex (1,309); Itta Bena, MS
02/18/2017; 5:30 pm		Alabama A&M	W 77–64	13–14 (9–5)	F. G. Clark Center (975); Baton Rouge, LA
02/20/2017; 7:30 pm		Alabama State	W 79–73	14–14 (10–5)	F. G. Clark Center (899); Baton Rouge, LA
02/25/2017; 5:30 pm, ESPN3		Alcorn State	L 67–68	14–15 (10–6)	F. G. Clark Center (1,021); Baton Rouge, LA
03/02/2017; 7:30 pm		at Prairie View A&M	L 64–70	14–16 (10–7)	William J. Nicks Building (1,200); Prairie View, TX
03/04/2017; 7:00 pm		at Texas Southern	L 69–82	14–17 (10–8)	Health and Physical Education Arena (3,902); Houston, TX
SWAC tournament
03/07/2017; 7:30 pm	(3)	(6) Jackson State; Quarterfinals	W 69–63	15–17	F. G. Clark Center (3,012); Baton Rouge, LA
03/10/2017; 8:30 pm	(3)	vs. (2) Alcorn State; Semifinals	L 59–81	15–18	Toyota Center; Houston, TX
*Non-conference game. ^{#}Rankings from AP Poll. (#) Tournament seedings in parentheses. All times are in Central Time.
