= 2016–17 Jackson State Tigers basketball team =

American college basketball season

2016–17 Jackson State Tigers basketball
- Conference: Southwestern Athletic Conference
- Record: 14–18 (10–8 SWAC)
- Head coach: Wayne Brent (4th season)
- Assistant coaches: Cason Burk; De'Suan Dixon; Jorel Washington
- Home arena: Williams Assembly Center

2016–17 SWAC men's basketball standings
	Conf.				Overall
Team	W		L	PCT	W		L	PCT
Texas Southern †	16	–	2	.889	23	–	12	.657
Alcorn State*	13	–	5	.722	18	–	14	.563
Grambling State	10	–	8	.556	16	–	17	.485
Jackson State	10	–	8	.556	14	–	18	.438
Southern	10	–	8	.556	15	–	18	.455
Prairie View A&M	10	–	8	.556	13	–	20	.394
Mississippi Valley State	7	–	11	.389	7	–	25	.219
Alabama State	6	–	12	.333	8	–	23	.258
Arkansas–Pine Bluff	6	–	12	.333	7	–	25	.219
Alabama A&M	2	–	16	.111	2	–	27	.069
† 2017 SWAC tournament winner *ineligible for postseason due to APR violations

The 2016–17 Jackson State Tigers basketball team represented Jackson State University during the 2016–17 NCAA Division I men's basketball season. The Tigers, led by fourth-year head coach Wayne Brent, played their home games at the Williams Assembly Center in Jackson, Mississippi as members of the Southwestern Athletic Conference. They finished the season 14–18, 10–8 in SWAC play to finish in a four-way tie for third place. As the No. 6 seed in the SWAC tournament, they lost to Southern in the quarterfinals.

== Previous season ==
The Tigers finished the 2015–16 season 20–16, 12–6 in SWAC play to finish in third place. They defeated Prairie View A&M and Mississippi Valley State to advance to the championship game of the SWAC tournament where they lost to Southern. They received an invitation to the CollegeInsider.com Tournament where they defeated Sam Houston State in the first round to before losing to Grand Canyon in the second round.

== Roster ==
2016–17 Jackson State Tigers men's basketball team
Players
Coaches

Pos.	#	Name	Height	Weight	Year	Hometown
G	0	Chace Franklin	6 ft 5 in (1.96 m)	205 lb (93 kg)	Sr	Dallas, TX
G	1	Charles Taylor, Jr.	6 ft 4 in (1.93 m)	190 lb (86 kg)	RS Jr	Washington, DC
G	2	Edric Dennis	6 ft 3 in (1.91 m)	188 lb (85 kg)	So	Dallas, TX
G	3	Yettra Specks	5 ft 10 in (1.78 m)	171 lb (78 kg)	Sr	Monroe, LA
F	4	Derek Roscoe	6 ft 9 in (2.06 m)	225 lb (102 kg)	RS Jr	Chicago, IL
G	5	Paris Collins	6 ft 4 in (1.93 m)	186 lb (84 kg)	RS Jr	San Antonio, TX
F	10	Sherron Wilson	6 ft 6 in (1.98 m)	230 lb (104 kg)	Jr	Las Vegas, NV
F	11	Anfernee Felton	6 ft 7 in (2.01 m)	200 lb (91 kg)	Jr	Jackson, MS
F	12	Maurice Rivers	6 ft 7 in (2.01 m)	200 lb (91 kg)	Jr	Atlanta, GA
G	13	Jordan Berry	6 ft 1 in (1.85 m)	170 lb (77 kg)	Fr	Desoto, TX
F	20	Jordan Ford	6 ft 7 in (2.01 m)	180 lb (82 kg)	Fr	Atlanta, GA
C	21	Demetrice Clopton	6 ft 9 in (2.06 m)	230 lb (104 kg)	Fr	Columbus, MS
F	22	Treshawn Bolden	6 ft 8 in (2.03 m)	235 lb (107 kg)	Sr	Jackson, MS
F	23	Darius Austin	6 ft 6 in (1.98 m)	220 lb (100 kg)	Jr	Centreville, IL
G	24	Jeremiah Bozeman	6 ft 2 in (1.88 m)	175 lb (79 kg)	Fr	Alva, OK
G	25	Jesse Love	6 ft 1 in (1.85 m)	185 lb (84 kg)	RS Fr	Jackson, MS
G	31	Dontaveon Robinson	6 ft 4 in (1.93 m)	180 lb (82 kg)	Sr	Jackson, MS
G	33	Montreal Nabors	6 ft 2 in (1.88 m)	160 lb (73 kg)	RS So	Abbeville, MS
F	35	Janarius Middleton	6 ft 8 in (2.03 m)	223 lb (101 kg)	Sr	Greenwood, MS

Head coach

- Wayne Brent

Assistant coach(es)

- Cason Burk
- De'Suan Dixon
- Jorel Washington

Legend

- (C) Team captain
- (S) Suspended
- (I) Ineligible
- (W) Walk-on
- Injured
- Current redshirt

== Schedule and results ==
Date time, TV	Rank^{#}	Opponent^{#}	Result	Record	Site (attendance) city, state
Non-conference regular season
Nov 11, 2016*; 12:15 pm		Xavier (LA)	W 66–54	1–0	Williams Assembly Center (4,021); Jackson, MS
Nov 16, 2016*; 7:30 pm		at Southeastern Louisiana	L 71–84	1–1	University Center (907); Hammond, LA
Nov 18, 2016*; 8:00 pm		at North Carolina Central; Global Sports Shootout	L 75–84	1–2	McLendon–McDougald Gymnasium (1,979); Durham, NC
Nov 21, 2016*; 7:00 pm		at Marshall; Global Sports Shootout	L 61–71	1–3	Cam Henderson Center (4,785); Huntington, WV
Nov 23, 2016*; 7:00 pm, ESPN3		at Ohio State; Global Sports Shootout	L 47–78	1–4	Value City Arena (10,513); Columbus, OH
Nov 26, 2016*; 6:00 pm		Western Carolina; Global Sports Shootout	L 47–58	1–5	Williams Assembly Center (225); Jackson, MS
Nov 30, 2016*; 8:00 pm, ESPN3		at Memphis	L 69–84	1–6	FedExForum (7,507); Memphis, TN
Dec 4, 2016*; 3:30 pm		Southern Miss	W 75–64	2–6	Williams Assembly Center; Jackson, MS
Dec 10, 2016*; 2:00 pm		at Drake	W 68–63	3–6	Knapp Center (2,467); Des Moines, IA
Dec 15, 2016*; 7:00 pm		Blue Mountain	L 49–57	3–7	Williams Assembly Center; Jackson, MS
Dec 17, 2016*; 5:00 pm, FSSW+		vs. No. 4 Baylor; Fort Hood Showcase	L 57–82	3–8	Abrams Gym (2,500); Fort Hood, TX
Dec 19, 2016*; 7:00 pm		at Duquesne	L 62–74	3–9	Palumbo Center (747); Pittsburgh, PA
Dec 30, 2016*; 7:30 pm		Fisk	W 94–62	4–9	Williams Assembly Center (805); Jackson, MS
SWAC regular season
Jan 2, 2017; 7:30 pm		at Alabama A&M	W 63–51	5–9 (1–0)	Elmore Gymnasium (1,487); Huntsville, AL
Jan 4, 2017; 7:30 pm		at Alabama State	W 63–60	6–9 (2–0)	Dunn–Oliver Acadome (1,059); Montgomery, AL
Jan 9, 2017		Alcorn State; Postponed (inclement weather), rescheduled for Jan. 11, 2017			Williams Assembly Center; Jackson, MS
Jan 9, 2017; 7:30 pm		Southern	W 65–61	7–9 (3–0)	Williams Assembly Center (1,327); Jackson, MS
Jan 11, 2017; 7:30 pm		Alcorn State	L 50–63	7–10 (3–1)	Williams Assembly Center (2,246); Jackson, MS
Jan 14, 2017; 5:20 pm		at Prairie View A&M	L 56–63	7–11 (3–2)	William J. Nicks Building (435); Prairie View, TX
Jan 16, 2017; 8:00 pm, ESPN3		at Texas Southern	L 44–67	7–12 (3–3)	Health and Physical Education Arena; Houston, TX
Jan 21, 2017; 5:30 pm		at Grambling State	L 57–72	7–13 (3–4)	Fredrick C. Hobdy Assembly Center (783); Grambling, LA
Jan 28, 2017; 5:30 pm		Mississippi Valley State	W 83–68	8–13 (4–4)	Williams Assembly Center; Jackson, MS
Jan 30, 2017; 7:30 pm		Arkansas-Pine Bluff	W 74–59	9–13 (5–4)	Williams Assembly Center; Jackson, MS
Feb 4, 2017; 5:30 pm		at Alcorn State	L 58–69	9–14 (5–5)	Davey Whitney Complex (1,914); Lorman, MS
Feb 6, 2017; 7:30 pm, ESPNU		at Southern	L 75–88	9–15 (5–6)	F. G. Clark Center (1,129); Baton Rouge, LA
Feb 11, 2017; 5:30 pm		Prairie View A&M	W 78–69	10–15 (6–6)	Williams Assembly Center (899); Jackson, MS
Feb 13, 2017; 7:30 pm		Texas Southern	W 71–62	11–15 (7–6)	Williams Assembly Center; Jackson, MS
Feb 18, 2017; 5:30 pm		Grambling State	L 59–62 ^{OT}	11–16 (7–7)	Williams Assembly Center (3,001); Jackson, MS
Feb 25, 2017; 5:30 pm		at Mississippi Valley State	L 67–70 ^{OT}	11–17 (7–8)	Harrison HPER Complex (2,052); Itta Bena, MS
Feb 27, 2017; 7:30 pm		at Arkansas-Pine Bluff	W 62–51	12–17 (8–8)	K. L. Johnson Complex (1,268); Pine Bluff, AR
Mar 2, 2017; 7:30 pm		Alabama A&M	W 72–64	13–17 (9–8)	Williams Assembly Center; Jackson, MS
Mar 4, 2017; 5:30 pm		Alabama State	W 65–59	14–17 (10–8)	Williams Assembly Center; Jackson, MS
SWAC tournament
Mar 7; 7:30 pm	(6)	at (3) Southern; Quarterfinals	L 63–69	14–18	F. G. Clark Center (3,012); Baton Rouge, LA
*Non-conference game. ^{#}Rankings from AP Poll. (#) Tournament seedings in parentheses. All times are in Central Time.
