= 2016–17 Grambling State Tigers men's basketball team =

American college basketball season

2016–17 Grambling State Tigers men's basketball
- Conference: Southwestern Athletic Conference
- Record: 16–17 (10–8 SWAC)
- Head coach: Shawn Walker (3rd season)
- Assistant coaches: Julius Allen; Kenyon Alston; Kyle Jones; Westley Gillum Jr.
- Home arena: Fredrick C. Hobdy Assembly Center

2016–17 SWAC men's basketball standings
	Conf.				Overall
Team	W		L	PCT	W		L	PCT
Texas Southern †	16	–	2	.889	23	–	12	.657
Alcorn State*	13	–	5	.722	18	–	14	.563
Grambling State	10	–	8	.556	16	–	17	.485
Jackson State	10	–	8	.556	14	–	18	.438
Southern	10	–	8	.556	15	–	18	.455
Prairie View A&M	10	–	8	.556	13	–	20	.394
Mississippi Valley State	7	–	11	.389	7	–	25	.219
Alabama State	6	–	12	.333	8	–	23	.258
Arkansas–Pine Bluff	6	–	12	.333	7	–	25	.219
Alabama A&M	2	–	16	.111	2	–	27	.069
† 2017 SWAC tournament winner *ineligible for postseason due to APR violations

The 2016–17 Grambling State Tigers men's basketball team represented Grambling State University during the 2016–17 NCAA Division I men's basketball season. The Tigers, led by third-year head coach Shawn Walker, played their home games at the Fredrick C. Hobdy Assembly Center in Grambling, Louisiana as members of the Southwestern Athletic Conference. They finished the season 16–17, 10–8 in SWAC play to finish in a four way tie for third place. As the 5-seed in the SWAC tournament they defeated Prairie View A&M before losing in the semifinals to Texas Southern.

On March 22, it was announced that head coach Shawn Walker's contract would not be renewed. He finished at Grambling State with a three-year record of 25–68. On May 12, Grambling State hired Donte Jackson from Stillman of the NAIA as new head coach.

== Previous season ==
The Tigers finished the 2015–16 season 7–24, 4–14 record in SWAC play to finish last in the conference. They lost to Mississippi Valley State in the first round of the SWAC tournament.

== Roster ==
2016–17 Grambling State Tigers men's basketball team
Players
Coaches

Pos.	#	Name	Height	Weight	Year	Hometown
G	0	Ervin Mitchell	6 ft 4 in (1.93 m)	180 lb (82 kg)	Sr	New York, New York
G	1	Ivy Smith Jr.	6 ft 0 in (1.83 m)	160 lb (73 kg)	Fr	Seattle, Washington
G	2	Nigel Ribeiro	6 ft 0 in (1.83 m)	170 lb (77 kg)	So	Chesapeake, Virginia
F	3	Deonte Hearns	6 ft 7 in (2.01 m)	215 lb (98 kg)	Sr	Cocoa, Florida
G	4	Remond Brown	6 ft 4 in (1.93 m)	180 lb (82 kg)	Sr	Monroe, Louisiana
G	5	Xairius Larry	5 ft 8 in (1.73 m)	175 lb (79 kg)	Jr	Farmerville, Louisiana
G	10	Chase Cormier	6 ft 0 in (1.83 m)	175 lb (79 kg)	Sr	Baltimore, Maryland
F	11	Averyl Ugba	6 ft 7 in (2.01 m)	225 lb (102 kg)	Jr	Silver Spring, Maryland
G	12	Travius Fielding	6 ft 0 in (1.83 m)	180 lb (82 kg)	Fr	Arcadia, Louisiana
G	20	Charles Simmons	6 ft 5 in (1.96 m)	175 lb (79 kg)	Fr	Ahoskie, North Carolina
G	21	Anthony Gaston	6 ft 3 in (1.91 m)	200 lb (91 kg)	Fr	Richmond, Virginia
G	22	Carlton Lowe	6 ft 2 in (1.88 m)	185 lb (84 kg)	Sr	Alexandria, Louisiana
G	23	Marcel Thompson	6 ft 3 in (1.91 m)	190 lb (86 kg)	Fr	Baltimore, Maryland
G/F	24	Diontae Jones	6 ft 6 in (1.98 m)	215 lb (98 kg)	Jr	Las Vegas, Nevada
G/F	32	Drake Wilks	6 ft 6 in (1.98 m)	190 lb (86 kg)	Fr	Little Rock, Arkansas
C	40	Noah Cummings	6 ft 9 in (2.06 m)	260 lb (118 kg)	Fr	Pembroke, North Carolina

Head coach

- Shawn Walker (Elizabeth City State)

Assistant coach(es)

- Julius Allen
- Kenyon Alston
- Kyle Jones (Arkansas–Pine Bluff)

Legend

- (C) Team captain
- (S) Suspended
- (I) Ineligible
- (W) Walk-on
- Injured
- Current redshirt

Roster

== Schedule and results ==
Date time, TV	Rank^{#}	Opponent^{#}	Result	Record	Site (attendance) city, state
Non-conference regular season
11/11/2016*; 6:00 pm		at East Carolina	L 57–72	0–1	Williams Arena at Minges Coliseum (4,805); Greenville, NC
11/17/2016*; 6:00 pm		North Carolina A&T	W 59–55	1–1	Fredrick C. Hobdy Assembly Center (1,023); Grambling, LA
11/19/2016*; 11:00 am, FS2		at Providence; Emerald Coast Classic - Campus Game	L 54–71	1–2	Dunkin' Donuts Center (6,093); Providence, RI
11/22/2016*; 6:00 pm		at No. 7 Virginia; Emerald Coast Classic - Campus Game	L 34–90	1–3	John Paul Jones Arena (13,235); Charlottesville, VA
11/25/2016*; 1:30 pm		vs. Texas–Rio Grande Valley; Emerald Coast Classic	L 93–101 ^{OT}	1–4	The Arena at NWFSC (380); Niceville, FL
11/26/2016*; 10:00 am		vs. Savannah State; Emerald Coast Classic	W 110–104	2–4	The Arena at NWFSC (200); Niceville, FL
11/28/2016*; 7:00 pm		Jarvis Christian	W 102–56	3–4	Fredrick C. Hobdy Assembly Center (373); Grambling, LA
11/30/2016*; 6:00 pm, ESPN3		at Miami (Ohio)	L 76–78 ^{OT}	3–5	Millett Hall (1,205); Oxford, OH
12/02/2016*; 6:00 pm		at Kent State	L 57–86	3–6	MAC Center (2,010); Kent, OH
12/05/2016*; 7:00 pm		Tougaloo	W 105–90	4–6	Fredrick C. Hobdy Assembly Center; Grambling, LA
12/09/2016*; 7:00 pm		Selma	W 103–53	5–6	Fredrick C. Hobdy Assembly Center (573); Grambling, LA
12/17/2016*; 7:00 pm		vs. Louisiana Tech; Shreveport-Bossier Holiday Classic	L 55–89	5–7	CenturyLink Center (877); Bossier City, LA
12/28/2016*; 7:00 pm		at Louisiana–Monroe	L 45–81	5–8	Fant–Ewing Coliseum (1,912); Monroe, LA
SWAC regular season
01/02/2017; 7:30 pm		at Alabama State	L 69–73	5–9 (0–1)	Dunn–Oliver Acadome (293); Montgomery, AL
01/04/2017; 7:30 pm		at Alabama A&M	W 69–67	6–9 (1–1)	Elmore Gymnasium; Normal, AL
01/07/2017; 5:30 pm		Southern	L 79–87	6–10 (1–2)	Fredrick C. Hobdy Assembly Center (753); Grambling, LA
01/09/2017; 7:30 pm		Alcorn State	W 67–62	7–10 (2–2)	Fredrick C. Hobdy Assembly Center (743); Grambling, LA
01/16/2017; 7:30 pm		at Texas Southern	L 55–76	7–11 (2–3)	Health and Physical Education Arena (1,017); Houston, TX
01/16/2017; 7:30 pm		at Prairie View A&M	L 82–94	7–12 (2–4)	William J. Nicks Building; Prairie View, TX
01/21/2017; 5:30 pm		Jackson State	W 72–57	8–12 (3–4)	Fredrick C. Hobdy Assembly Center (783); Grambling, LA
01/28/2017; 5:30 pm		Arkansas–Pine Bluff	W 61–53	9–12 (4–4)	Fredrick C. Hobdy Assembly Center; Grambling, LA
01/30/2017; 7:30 pm		Mississippi Valley State	W 77–74 ^{OT}	10–12 (5–4)	Fredrick C. Hobdy Assembly Center (673); Grambling, LA
02/04/2017; 4:00 pm		at Southern	L 66–67	10–13 (5–5)	F. G. Clark Center (3,079); Baton Rouge, LA
02/06/2017; 7:30 pm		at Alcorn State	L 65–75	10–14 (5–6)	Davey Whitney Complex (962); Lorman, MS
02/11/2017; 5:30 pm		Texas Southern	L 70–77	10–15 (5–7)	Fredrick C. Hobdy Assembly Center (679); Grambling, LA
02/13/2017; 7:30 pm		Prairie View A&M	W 61–58	11–15 (6–7)	Fredrick C. Hobdy Assembly Center (287); Grambling, LA
02/18/2017; 5:30 pm		at Jackson State	W 62–59 ^{OT}	12–15 (7–7)	Williams Assembly Center (3,001); Jackson, MS
02/25/2017; 7:30 pm		at Arkansas–Pine Bluff	W 78–58	13–15 (8–7)	K. L. Johnson Complex (2,345); Pine Bluff, AR
02/27/2017; 7:30 pm		at Mississippi Valley State	L 80–84	13–16 (8–8)	Harrison HPER Complex (1,024); Itta Bena, MS
03/02/2017; 7:30 pm		Alabama State	W 82–69	14–16 (9–8)	Fredrick C. Hobdy Assembly Center (373); Grambling, LA
03/04/2017; 5:30 pm		Alabama A&M	W 78–57	15–16 (10–8)	Fredrick C. Hobdy Assembly Center (579); Grambling, LA
SWAC tournament
03/07/2017; 9:00 pm, ESPNU	(5)	at (4) Prairie View A&M; Quarterfinals	W 81–77	16–16	William Nicks Building (1,336); Prairie View, TX
03/10/2017; 2:30 pm	(5)	vs. (1) Texas Southern; Semifinals	L 57–62	16–17	Toyota Center; Houston, TX
*Non-conference game. ^{#}Rankings from AP Poll. (#) Tournament seedings in parentheses. All times are in Central Time. Source
