= Shawn Walker =

American basketball player and coach (born 1972)

Biographical details
- Born: February 2, 1972 (age 54)

Playing career
- 1991–1994: Elizabeth City State
- Position: Guard

Coaching career (HC unless noted)
- 1995–1996: Slippery Rock (grad. asst.)
- 1996: Elizabeth City State (asst.)
- 1997–2001: Voorhees
- 2001–2002: Elizabeth City State (women's)
- 2002–2014: Elizabeth City State
- 2014–2017: Grambling State

Head coaching record
- Overall: 25–68

Shawn Walker (born February 2, 1972) is an American basketball coach and the former head coach of Grambling State University Tigers men's basketball program and former assistant coach and college basketball player.

Walker's contract with Grambling was not renewed following the 2016–17 season.

== Div I Coaching Record ==
Record table
| Season | Team | Overall | Conference | Standing | Postseason |
|---|---|---|---|---|---|
Grambling State (SWAC) (2014–2017)
| 2014–15 | Grambling State | 2–27 | 0–18 | 10th | |
| 2015–16 | Grambling State | 7–24 | 4–14 | 10th | |
| 2016–17 | Grambling State | 16–17 | 10–8 | T–3rd | |
| Grambling State: | | 25–68 | 14–40 | | |
| Total: | | 25–68 | | | |
National champion Postseason invitational champion Conference regular season champion Conference regular season and conference tournament champion Division regular season champion Division regular season and conference tournament champion Conference tournament champion
