= Garfield, Mahoning County, Ohio =

Unincorporated community in Ohio, U.S.

Coordinates: 40°55′06″N 80°57′18″W

Garfield is an unincorporated community in Mahoning County, in the U.S. state of Ohio.

== History ==
Garfield was laid out in 1875 when the Pennsylvania Railroad was extended to that point. The community was named after James A. Garfield, an Ohio legislator and afterward 20th President of the United States. An early variant name was Garfield Station. A post office called Garfield was established in 1899, and remained in operation until 1958.
