= 2018–19 Southland Conference men's basketball season =

NCAA Division I basketball season

- League: NCAA Division I
- Sport: Basketball
- Duration: November 2018 through March 2019
- Teams: 13

Regular Season
- Champion: Sam Houston State
- Season MVP: Cameron Delaney (Sam Houston State)
- Top scorer: Shannon Bogues – 536 pts (Stephen F. Austin)

Southland tournament
- Champions: Abilene Christian
- Runners-up: Texas A&M–Corpus Christi
- Finals MVP: Jaren Lewis (Abilene Christian)

Southland Conference men's basketball seasons
- ← 2017–18 2019–20 →

2018–19 Southland Conference men's basketball standings
	Conf.				Overall
Team	W		L	PCT	W		L	PCT
Sam Houston State	16	–	2	.889	21	–	12	.636
Abilene Christian †	14	–	4	.778	27	–	7	.794
Southeastern Louisiana	12	–	6	.667	17	–	16	.515
New Orleans	12	–	6	.667	19	–	14	.576
Lamar	12	–	6	.667	20	–	13	.606
Texas A&M–CC	9	–	9	.500	14	–	18	.438
Central Arkansas	8	–	10	.444	14	–	19	.424
Houston Baptist	8	–	10	.444	12	–	18	.400
Stephen F. Austin	7	–	11	.389	14	–	16	.467
Nicholls	7	–	11	.389	14	–	17	.452
Northwestern State	6	–	12	.333	11	–	20	.355
McNeese State	5	–	13	.278	9	–	22	.290
Incarnate Word	1	–	17	.056	6	–	25	.194
† 2019 Southland tournament winner

The 2018–19 Southland Conference men's basketball season, the conference's 56th, began with practices in October 2018, followed by the start of the 2018–19 NCAA Division I men's basketball season on November 6, 2018. Conference play began on January 2, 2019 concluding on March 9, 2019. The Sam Houston State Bearkats won the regular season championship with a conference record of 16–2. The 2019 Southland Conference men's basketball tournament was held in Katy, Texas at the Merrell Center from March 13–17, 2019. The 2nd seeded Abilene Christian Wildcats won the conference tournament championship and received the conference automatic bid to the NCAA tournament. Two other teams also received bids to post season tournaments. Conference regular season champion, Sam Houston State, received the conference automatic bid to the NIT tournament. New Orleans received a bid to the CIT tournament.

== Preseason ==
=== Coaching changes ===
McNeese State University announced that it would not renew the contract of former head coach Dave Simmons on March 4, 2018. Heath Schroyer was named head coach on March 15, 2018.

Incarnate Word announced that Ken Burmeister would not return on March 6, 2018. Carson Cunningham was named as men's basketball head coach on March 23, 2018.

=== 2018-19 Southland Men's Basketball Preseason Poll ===
Rank	Team ( ) = first place votes	Votes
1	Stephen F. Austin(23)	287
2	Southeastern Louisiana (2)	243
3	New Orleans	204
4	Abilene Christian (1)	196
5	Lamar	186
6	Sam Houston State	184
7	McNeese State	172
8	Central Arkansas	136
9	Texas A&M–Corpus Christi	115
T10	Houston Baptist	101
T10	Nicholls State	101
12	Northwestern State	73
13	Incarnate Word	30

=== Preseason All-Conference Teams ===
Award	Recipients
First Team	Marlain Veal (Southeastern Louisiana) Shannon Bogues (Stephen F. Austin); Kevon Harris (Stephen F. Austin); T. J. Holyfield (Stephen F. Austin); Ishmael Lane (Northwestern State)
Second Team	Josh Ibarra (Houston Baptist) Jalone Friday (Abilene Christian); Josh Nzeakor (Lamar); Jaren Lewis (Abilene Christian); Marcus Harris (Sam Houston State)

== Postseason ==
=== Southland Conference tournament ===
- March 13–16, 2019: Southland Conference Men's Basketball Tournament, Leonard E. Merrill Center, Katy, Texas

Session	Game	Time*	Matchup^{#}	Score	Television
First round – Wednesday, March 13, 2019
1	1	5:00 pm	No. 5 Lamar vs. No. 8 Houston Baptist	81–79	ESPN+
1	2	7:30 pm	No. 6 Texas A&M–CC vs. No. 7 Central Arkansas	53–73	ESPN+
Second round – Thursday, March 14, 2019
2	3	5:00 pm	No. 4 New Orleans vs. No. 5 Lamar	76–72	ESPN+
2	4	7:30 pm	No. 3 Southeastern Louisiana vs. No. 7 Central Arkansas	79–65	ESPN+
Semifinals – Friday, March 15, 2019
3	5	5:00 pm	No. 1 Sam Houston State vs. No. 4 New Orleans	–	ESPN+
3	6	7:30 pm	No. 2 Abilene Christian vs. No. 3 Southeastern Louisiana	-	ESPN+
Championship – Saturday, March 16, 2019
4	7	8:30 pm	Winner Game 5 vs. Winner Game 6	–	ESPN2
*Game times in CDT. #-Rankings denote tournament seeding.

=== NCAA tournament ===
Abilene Christian, winner of the conference tournament, was awarded an automatic bid to the NCAA Division I basketball tournament. Abilene Christian's season ended losing to Kentucky in the first round.

=== National Invitation tournament ===
Sam Houston State received the conference automatic bid to the NIT tournament. The Bearkats lost in the first round of the tournament to TCU.

=== CollegeInsider.com Postseason tournament ===
New Orleans received a bid to the CIT. The Privateers lost in an overtime game to Texas Southern in the first round.

== Awards and honors ==
=== Regular season ===
==== SLC Player-of-the-Week ====
- Nov. 12 – Jaren Lewis (Abilene Christian)
- Nov. 19 – Morgan Taylor (Incarnate Word)
- Nov. 26 – Jaren Lewis (Abilene Christian)
- Dec. 3 – Kevon Harris (Stephen F. Austin)
- Dec. 10 – Shannon Bogues (Stephen F. Austin)
- Dec. 17 – Roydell Brown (McNeese State)
- Dec. 27 – Nick Garth (Lamar)
- Jan. 2 – Kevon Harris (Stephen F. Austin)
- Jan. 7 – Ian DuBose (Houston Baptist)
- Jan. 14 – Payten Ricks (Abilene Christian)
- Jan. 21 – Kai Mitchell (Sam Houston State)
- Jan. 28 – Cameron Delaney (Sam Houston State)
- Feb. 4 – Christian Barrett (Lamar)
- Feb. 11 – Ishmael Lane (Northwestern State)
- Feb. 18 – Nick Garth (Lamar)
- Feb. 25 – Josh Delaney (Sam Houston State)
- Mar. 4 – Nick Garth (Lamar)
- Mar. 10 – Jerimiah Jefferson (Nicholls)

=== Postseason ===
==== SLC All-Conference Teams and Awards ====
Award	Recipients
Coach of the Year	Joe Golding (Abilene Christian)
Player of the Year	Cameron Delaney (Sam Houston State)
Defensive Player of the Year	Ishmael Lane (Northwestern State)
Freshman of the Year	Gerrale Gates (New Orleans)
Newcomer of the Year	Kai Mitchell (Sam Houston State)
First Team	Cameron Delaney (Sam Houston State); Marlain Veal (Southeastern Louisiana); Ishmael Lane (Northwestern Louisiana); Moses Greenwood (Southeastern Louisiana); Nick Garth (Lamar)
Second Team	Kevon Harris (Stephen F. Austin); Josh Nzeakor (Lamar); Jaren Lewis (Abilene Christian); Shannon Bogues (Stephen F. Austin); Ian DuBose (Houston Baptist)
Third Team	Jaylen Franklin (Abilene Christian); Josh Delaney (Sam Houston State); Kai Mitchell (Sam Houston State); Ezekial Charles (New Orleans); Kareem South (Texas A&M–Corpus Christi)
Honorable Mention	Roydell Brown (McNeese State); Jeremiah Jefferson (Nicholls); Payten Ricks (Abilene Christian); Thatch Unruh (Central Arkansas)
All-Defensive Team	Ishmael Lane (Northwestern State); Jaylen Franklin (Abilene Christian); Braxton Bonds (Houston Baptist); Marlain Veal (Southeastern Louisiana); Hayden Koval (Central Arkansas)
First Team All-Academic	Jaren Lewis (Abilene Christian); Jeremiah Jefferson (Nicholls); Hayden Koval (Central Arkansas); Ishmael Lane (Northwestern State); Oliver Lynch-Daniels (Houston Baptist)
Second Team All-Academic	Ezekial Charles (New Orleans); Ian DuBose (Houston Baptist); Hayden Farquhar (Abilene Christian); Scott Plaisance, Jr. (New Orleans); Kareem Smith (Texas A&M–Corpus Christi)
All-Tournament Team	Jaren Lewis (Abilene Christian); Jaylen Franklin (Abilene Christian); Payten Ricks (Abilene Christian); Scott Plaisance, Jr. (New Orleans); Josh Nzeakor (Lamar)
Tournament MVP	Jaren Lewis (Abilene Christian)
