= 2018–19 New Orleans Privateers men's basketball team =

American college basketball season

2018–19 New Orleans Privateers men's basketball

CIT, first round
- Conference: Southland Conference
- Record: 19–14 (12–6 Southland)
- Head coach: Mark Slessinger (8th season)
- Assistant coaches: Jody Bailey; Kris Arkenberg; Bill Duany
- Home arena: Lakefront Arena

2018–19 Southland Conference men's basketball standings
| | Conf. | | | | Overall |
| Team | W | | L | PCT | W | | L | PCT |
|---|---|---|---|---|---|---|---|---|
| Sam Houston State | 16 | – | 2 | .889 | 21 | – | 12 | .636 |
| Abilene Christian † | 14 | – | 4 | .778 | 27 | – | 7 | .794 |
| Southeastern Louisiana | 12 | – | 6 | .667 | 17 | – | 16 | .515 |
| New Orleans | 12 | – | 6 | .667 | 19 | – | 14 | .576 |
| Lamar | 12 | – | 6 | .667 | 20 | – | 13 | .606 |
| Texas A&M–CC | 9 | – | 9 | .500 | 14 | – | 18 | .438 |
| Central Arkansas | 8 | – | 10 | .444 | 14 | – | 19 | .424 |
| Houston Baptist | 8 | – | 10 | .444 | 12 | – | 18 | .400 |
| Stephen F. Austin | 7 | – | 11 | .389 | 14 | – | 16 | .467 |
| Nicholls | 7 | – | 11 | .389 | 14 | – | 17 | .452 |
| Northwestern State | 6 | – | 12 | .333 | 11 | – | 20 | .355 |
| McNeese State | 5 | – | 13 | .278 | 9 | – | 22 | .290 |
| Incarnate Word | 1 | – | 17 | .056 | 6 | – | 25 | .194 |
† 2019 Southland tournament winner

The 2018–19 New Orleans Privateers men's basketball team represented the University of New Orleans during the 2018–19 NCAA Division I men's basketball season. The Privateers were led by eighth-year head coach Mark Slessinger and played their home games at Lakefront Arena as members of the Southland Conference. The team finished the season 19–14 overall and 12–6 in Southland play. In conference, they tied for third place with Lamar and Southeastern Louisiana. As the number four seed in Southland Conference tournament, the Privateers defeated Lamar in the second round and Sam Houston State in the semifinals, before losing to Abilene Christian in the championship finals game. On March 17, New Orleans received an invitation to the CollegeInsider.com Tournament. Their season ended with an overtime loss to Texas Southern.

== Previous season ==
The Privateers finished the 2017–18 season 16–17, 11–7 in Southland play, to finish in a tie for fifth place. As the No. 5 seed in the Southland tournament, they defeated Texas A&M–Corpus Christi in the first round before losing to Sam Houston State in the quarterfinals. They received an invitation to the College Basketball Invitational where they defeated Texas–Rio Grande Valley in the first round and received a second-round bye before losing in the quarterfinals to Campbell.

== Roster ==
2018–19 New Orleans Privateers men's basketball team
Players
Coaches

| Pos. | # | Name | Height | Weight | Year | Hometown |
|---|---|---|---|---|---|---|
| G | 0 | Pierre Johnson | 6 ft 3 in (1.91 m) | 210 lb (95 kg) | Jr | Washington, D.C. |
| G | 1 | Damion Rosser | 6 ft 4 in (1.93 m) | 205 lb (93 kg) | So | McDonough, GA |
| G | 2 | Lamont Berzat | 5 ft 6 in (1.68 m) | 155 lb (70 kg) | So | New Orleans, LA |
| G | 3 | Troy Green | 6 ft 3 in (1.91 m) | 210 lb (95 kg) | So | St. Rose, LA |
| G | 4 | Bryson Robinson | 6 ft 4 in (1.93 m) | 195 lb (88 kg) | Jr | Mesquite, TX |
| G | 5 | Charles Bohannon | 6 ft 90 in (4.11 m) | 195 lb (88 kg) | So | Austin, TX |
| F | 10 | Gerrale Gates | 6 ft 6 in (1.98 m) | 235 lb (107 kg) | Fr | Charlotte, NC |
| F | 11 | Jamel Myers | 6 ft 7 in (2.01 m) | 219 lb (99 kg) | Fr | Cape Coral, FL |
| F | 12 | Amari Haynes | 6 ft 8 in (2.03 m) | 210 lb (95 kg) | Fr | Cape Coral, FL |
| G | 13 | Jorge Rosa | 6 ft 4 in (1.93 m) | 203 lb (92 kg) | RS Sr | Orlando, FL |
| G | 15 | Tyren Harrison | 6 ft 5 in (1.96 m) | 185 lb (84 kg) | Sr | Queens, NY |
| G | 20 | Larry III Robinson | 5 ft 11 in (1.8 m) | 175 lb (79 kg) | Jr | Bossier City, LA |
| C | 21 | Bol Riek | 7 ft 3 in (2.21 m) | 222 lb (101 kg) | So | Bentiu, South Sudan |
| G | 33 | Ezekiel Charles | 6 ft 4 in (1.93 m) | 205 lb (93 kg) | Sr | Brooklyn, NY |
| F | 55 | Scott Jr. Plaisance | 6 ft 9 in (2.06 m) | 220 lb (100 kg) | RS Sr | Marrero, LA |

Head coach

- Mark Slessinger (Aurora)

Assistant coach(es)

- Jody Bailey (Louisville)
- Kris Arkenberg (Franklin (IN))
- Bill Duany (Indiana)

Legend

- (C) Team captain
- (S) Suspended
- (I) Ineligible
- (W) Walk-on
- Injured
- Current redshirt

Roster
Last update: May 10, 2025

== Schedule and results ==
| Date time, TV | Rank^{#} | Opponent^{#} | Result | Record | Site (attendance) city, state |
Non-conference regular season
| November 6, 2018*; 7:45 p.m. | | Spring Hill | W 95–66 | 1–0 | Lakefront Arena (611); New Orleans, LA |
| November 8, 2018*; 7:00 p.m., BTN | | at Northwestern | L 52–82 | 1–1 | Welsh–Ryan Arena (6,747); Evanston, IL |
| November 12, 2018*; 7:00 p.m. | | Pensacola Christian | W 87–59 | 2–1 | Lakefront Arena (321); New Orleans, LA |
| November 14, 2018*; 7:00 p.m., CUSA.TV | | at UAB | L 68–75 | 2–2 | Bartow Arena (2,874); Birmingham, AL |
| November 24, 2018*; 12:00 p.m. | | Governors State | W 97–53 | 3–2 | Lakefront Arena (524); New Orleans, LA |
| November 28, 2018*; 7:00 p.m. | | Louisiana | L 73–77 ^{OT} | 3–3 | Lakefront Arena (1,582); New Orleans, LA |
| December 5, 2018*; 7:00 p.m. | | South Alabama | W 71–60 | 4–3 | Lakefront Arena (505); New Orleans, LA |
| December 13, 2018*; 7:00 p.m., ESPN3 | | at Tulsa | L 60–70 | 4–4 | Reynolds Center (3,570); Tulsa, OK |
| December 18, 2018*; 7:00 p.m. | | vs. Williams Baptist | W 90–62 | 5–4 | Alario Center (381); Westwego, LA |
| December 20, 2018*; 6:00 p.m., ACC+ | | at Pittsburgh | L 57–88 | 5–5 | Petersen Events Center (3,988); Pittsburgh, PA |
| December 29, 2018*; 5:00 p.m., FSN-SW | | at Baylor | L 44–84 | 5–6 | Ferrell Center (6,123); Waco, TX |
Southland regular season
| January 2, 2019; 7:00 p.m. | | at Abilene Christian | L 58–68 | 5–7 (0–1) | Moody Coliseum (525); Abilene, TX |
| January 5, 2019; 2:00 p.m. | | Houston Baptist | W 81–76 | 6–7 (1–1) | Lakefront Arena (553); New Orleans, LA |
| January 9, 2019; 7:00 p.m., ESPN+ | | at Lamar | W 78–71 ^{OT} | 7–7 (2–1) | Montagne Center (1,537); Beaumont, TX |
| January 12, 2019; 4:15 p.m. | | McNeese State | W 79–66 | 8–7 (3–1) | Lakefront Arena (625); New Orleans, LA |
| January 16, 2019; 7:00 p.m. | | Stephen F. Austin | W 68–61 | 9–7 (4–1) | Lakefront Arena (734); New Orleans, LA |
| January 19, 2019; 5:00 p.m., ESPN3 | | at Texas A&M–Corpus Christi | L 61–76 | 9–8 (4–2) | American Bank Center (1,215); Corpus Christi, TX |
| January 23, 2019; 7:00 p.m. | | at Central Arkansas | L 71–76 | 9–9 (4–3) | Farris Center (848); Conway, AR |
| January 26, 2019; 3:00 p.m., ELVN / SLC Digital | | at Incarnate Word | W 61–52 | 10–9 (5–3) | McDermott Convocation Center (507); San Antonio, TX |
| January 30, 2019; 7:00 p.m. | | Northwestern State | W 72–64 | 11–9 (6–3) | Lakefront Arena (607); New Orleans, LA |
| February 2, 2019; 7:00 p.m. | | Incarnate Word | W 89–72 | 12–9 (7–3) | Lakefront Arena (652); New Orleans, LA |
| February 6, 2019; 7:00 p.m. | | at Northwestern State | W 81–73 ^{OT} | 13–9 (8–3) | Prather Coliseum (1,520); Natchitoches, LA |
| February 9, 2019; 4:15 p.m. | | Nicholls; Homecoming | L 63–64 | 13–10 (8–4) | Lakefront Arena (1,334); New Orleans, LA |
| February 16, 2019; 4:15 p.m. | | Texas A&M–Corpus Christi | W 68–58 | 14–10 (9–4) | Lakefront Arena (793); New Orleans, LA |
| February 20, 2019; 7:00 p.m. | | Southeastern Louisiana | W 89–68 | 15–10 (10–4) | Lakefront Arena (813); New Orleans, LA |
| February 23, 2019; 3:00 p.m. | | at McNeese State | W 60–51 | 16–10 (11–4) | H&HP Complex (2,221); Lake Charles, LA |
| February 27, 2019; 7:00 p.m. | | Sam Houston State | L 60–71 | 16–11 (11–5) | Lakefront Arena (852); New Orleans, LA |
| March 2, 2019; 3:30 p.m. | | at Nicholls | W 80–70 | 17–11 (12–5) | Stopher Gymnasium (503); Thibodaux, LA |
| March 6, 2019; 7:00 p.m. | | at Southeastern Louisiana | L 67–81 | 17–12 (12–6) | University Center (771); Hammond, LA |
Southland tournament
| March 14, 2019; 5:00 p.m., ESPN+ | (4) | vs. (5) Lamar; Second round | W 76–72 | 18–12 | Leonard E. Merrell Center; Katy, TX |
| March 15, 2019; 5:00 p.m., ESPN+ | (4) | vs. (1) Sam Houston State; Semifinal | W 79–76 | 19–12 | Leonard E. Merrell Center; Katy, TX |
| March 16, 2019; 8:30 p.m., ESPN2 | (4) | vs. (2) Abilene Christian; Final | L 60–77 | 19–13 | Leonard E. Merrell Center (1,751); Katy, TX |
CollegeInsider.com Postseason Tournament
| March 20, 2019*; 7:00 p.m. | | Texas Southern; First round | L 89–95 ^{OT} | 19–14 | Lakefront Arena (612); New Orleans, LA |
*Non-conference game. ^{#}Rankings from AP poll. (#) Tournament seedings in parentheses. All times are in Central.

== See also ==
- 2018–19 New Orleans Privateers women's basketball team
