= 2018–19 Sam Houston State Bearkats men's basketball team =

American college basketball season

2018–19 Sam Houston State Bearkats men's basketball

Southland regular season champions

NIT, First Round
- Conference: Southland Conference
- Record: 21–12 (16–2 Southland)
- Head coach: Jason Hooten (9th season)
- Assistant coaches: Kyle Campbell (2nd season); Chris Mudge (9th season); Chuck Taylor (3rd season)
- Home arena: Bernard Johnson Coliseum (Capacity: 6,110)

2018–19 Southland Conference men's basketball standings
	Conf.				Overall
Team	W		L	PCT	W		L	PCT
Sam Houston State	16	–	2	.889	21	–	12	.636
Abilene Christian †	14	–	4	.778	27	–	7	.794
Southeastern Louisiana	12	–	6	.667	17	–	16	.515
New Orleans	12	–	6	.667	19	–	14	.576
Lamar	12	–	6	.667	20	–	13	.606
Texas A&M–CC	9	–	9	.500	14	–	18	.438
Central Arkansas	8	–	10	.444	14	–	19	.424
Houston Baptist	8	–	10	.444	12	–	18	.400
Stephen F. Austin	7	–	11	.389	14	–	16	.467
Nicholls	7	–	11	.389	14	–	17	.452
Northwestern State	6	–	12	.333	11	–	20	.355
McNeese State	5	–	13	.278	9	–	22	.290
Incarnate Word	1	–	17	.056	6	–	25	.194
† 2019 Southland tournament winner

The 2018–19 Sam Houston State Bearkats men's basketball team represent Sam Houston State University during the 2018–19 NCAA Division I men's basketball season. The Bearkats are led by ninth-year head coach Jason Hooten and play their home games at the Bernard Johnson Coliseum in Huntsville, Texas as members of the Southland Conference. They finished the season 21-12, 16-2 in Southland play to finish in 1st place. As the No. 1 seed in the Southland tournament, they lost to New Orleans in the semifinals. They received an automatic bid to the NIT where they lost in the first round to TCU.

== Previous season ==
The Bearkats finished the 2017–18 season 21–15, 12–6 in Southland play to finish in fourth place. They defeated New Orleans in the quarterfinals of the Southland tournament before losing in the semifinals to Southeastern Louisiana. They were invited to the CollegeInsider.com Tournament where, after a first round bye, they defeated Eastern Michigan in the second round and UTSA in the quarterfinals before losing in the semifinals to Northern Colorado.

== Roster ==
2018–19 Sam Houston State Bearkats men's basketball team
Players
Coaches

Pos.	#	Name	Height	Weight	Year	Hometown
G/F	0	Albert Almanza	6 ft 6 in (1.98 m)	195 lb (88 kg)	RS Sr	Austin, Texas
F	1	R. J. Smith	6 ft 5 in (1.96 m)	220 lb (100 kg)	Jr	Olathe, Kansas
G	2	Cameron Delaney	6 ft 4 in (1.93 m)	205 lb (93 kg)	RS Sr	Harker Heights, Texas
G	3	Chad Bowie	6 ft 2 in (1.88 m)	180 lb (82 kg)	Jr	Houston, Texas
G	4	Dajuan Jones	5 ft 10 in (1.78 m)	165 lb (75 kg)	So	Killeen, Texas
G	5	Zaqwaun Matthews	6 ft 4 in (1.93 m)	185 lb (84 kg)	Jr	Charlotte, North Carolina
G	10	Zach Nutall	6 ft 3 in (1.91 m)	185 lb (84 kg)	Fr	Bryan, Texas
G	11	Xavier Bryant	6 ft 0 in (1.83 m)	180 lb (82 kg)	Fr	DeSoto, Texas
F/C	13	Bubba Furlong	6 ft 9 in (2.06 m)	240 lb (109 kg)	So	Waco, Texas
G	15	Josh Delaney	6 ft 0 in (1.83 m)	173 lb (78 kg)	Sr	Harker Heights, Texas
F/C	20	Kia Mitchell	6 ft 7 in (2.01 m)	245 lb (111 kg)	Jr	Haverstraw, New York
G	22	Marcus Harris	6 ft 0 in (1.83 m)	180 lb (82 kg)	RS Sr	San Antonio, Texas
F	24	Cyrus Johnson	6 ft 5 in (1.96 m)	220 lb (100 kg)	Fr	Culver City, California
F/C	35	Chidozie Ndu	6 ft 11 in (2.11 m)	225 lb (102 kg)	So	Lagos, Nigeria

Head coach

- Jason Hooten (Tarleton State)

Assistant coach(es)

- Kyle Campbell (Hastings)
- Chris Mudge (Texas)
- Chuck Taylor (Wayne State (MI))

Legend

- (C) Team captain
- (S) Suspended
- (I) Ineligible
- (W) Walk-on
- Injured
- Current redshirt

Roster
Last update: September 13, 2018

== Offseason ==
=== 2018–19 recruiting class ===
College recruiting information
Name	Hometown	School	Height	Weight	Commit date
RJ Smith; PG	Olathe, KS	North HS / Butler CC / Oral Roberts	6 ft 5 in (1.96 m)	220 lb (100 kg)	
RJ Smith; PG	Recruit ratings: No ratings found				
Kai Mitchell; G	Haverstraw, NY	Spring Valley HS / Hutchinson CC	6 ft 7 in (2.01 m)	245 lb (111 kg)	
Kai Mitchell; G	Recruit ratings: (66)				
Zaqwaun Matthews; G	Charlotte, NC	Myers Park HS / Cape Fear CC / Chattanooga	6 ft 4 in (1.93 m)	185 lb (84 kg)	
Zaqwaun Matthews; G	Recruit ratings: No ratings found				
Chad Bowie; G	Houston, TX	Fort Bend HS / Kilgore College	6 ft 2 in (1.88 m)	180 lb (82 kg)	
Chad Bowie; G	Recruit ratings: No ratings found				
Overall recruit ranking:
Note: In many cases, Scout, Rivals, 247Sports, On3, and ESPN may conflict in their listings of height and weight.; In these cases, the average was taken. ESPN grades are on a 100-point scale.; Sources:

== Schedule and results ==
Date time, TV	Rank^{#}	Opponent^{#}	Result	Record	Site (attendance) city, state
Non-conference regular season
Nov 6, 2018*; 6:30 pm, BSN YouTube		East Texas Baptist	W 85–64	1–0	Bernard Johnson Coliseum (1,019); Huntsville, TX
Nov 8, 2018*; 6:30 pm, ESPN3		Southwestern	W 94–56	2–0	Bernard Johnson Coliseum (1,194); Huntsville, TX
Nov 11, 2018*; 4:00 pm		at Louisiana Tech	L 69–76	2–1	Thomas Assembly Center (2,349); Ruston, LA
Nov 14, 2018*; 6:00 pm, ACCN Extra		at No. 19 Clemson; Cayman Islands Classic campus-site	L 59–74	2–2	Littlejohn Coliseum (6,227); Clemson, SC
Nov 16, 2018*; 6:00 pm, SECN+		at Georgia; Cayman Islands Classic campus-site	L 64–75	2–3	Stegeman Coliseum (7,195); Athens, GA
Nov 19, 2018*; 3:00 pm		vs. Jackson State; Cayman Islands Classic campus-site	W 75–60	3–3	Freedom Hall Civic Center; Johnson City, TN
Nov 20, 2018*; 6:00pm, ESPN3		at East Tennessee State; Cayman Islands Classic campus-site	L 63–77	3–4	Freedom Hall Civic Center (3,203); Johnson City, TN
Nov 28, 2018*; 6:30 pm, ESPN+		Central Michigan	L 65–81	3–5	Bernard Johnson Coliseum (754); Huntsville, TX
Dec 1, 2018*; 3:00 pm		at Little Rock	L 52–79	3–6	Jack Stephens Center (1,777); Little Rock, AR
Dec 8, 2018*; 3:00 pm, MWN		at Colorado State	L 65–71	3–7	Moby Arena (2,298); Fort Collins, CO
Dec 18, 2018*; 6:30 pm		Alabama State	W 78–57	4–7	Bernard G. Johnson Coliseum (625); Huntsville, TX
Dec 22, 2018*; 3:00 pm		at Utah Valley	L 79–85	4–8	UCCU Center (1,920); Orem, UT
Dec 31, 2018*; 2:00 pm		Texas Lutheran	W 84–54	5–8	Bernard Johnson Coliseum; Huntsville, TX
Southland regular season
Jan 5, 2019; 6:30 pm		Abilene Christian	W 71-68	6–8 (1–0)	Bernard G. Johnson Coliseum (771); Huntsville, TX
Jan 9, 2019; 6:30 pm		at Central Arkansas	W 78–69	7–8 (2–0)	Farris Center (575); Conway, AR
Jan 12, 2019; 5:30 pm		Incarnate Word	W 66–52	8–8 (3–0)	Bernard G. Johnson Coliseum (703); Huntsville, TX
Jan 16, 2019; 6:30 pm		Texas A&M–Corpus Christi	W 72–50	9–8 (4–0)	Bernard G. Johnson Coliseum (855); Huntsville, TX
Jan 19, 2019; 7:00 pm		at Houston Baptist	W 71–65	10–8 (5–0)	Sharp Gymnasium (948); Houston, TX
Jan 23, 2019; 6:30 pm		at Northwestern State	W 78–64	11–8 (6–0)	Prather Coliseum (1,501); Natchitoches, LA
Jan 26, 2019; 5:30 pm		Lamar	W 69–59	12–8 (7–0)	Bernard Johnson Coliseum; Huntsville, TX
Jan 30, 2019; 7:00 pm		at Southeastern Louisiana	W 62–52	13–8 (8–0)	University Center (1,029); Hammond, LA
Feb 2, 2019; 7:00 pm		Stephen F. Austin	W 94–72	14–8 (9–0)	Bernard G. Johnson Coliseum (3,134); Huntsville, TX
Feb 6, 2019; 6:30 pm		McNeese State	W 77–62	15–8 (10–0)	Bernard G. Johnson Coliseum (1,193); Huntsville, TX
Feb 9, 2019; 6:00 pm		at Abilene Christian	W 90–85 ^{2OT}	16–8 (11–0)	Moody Coliseum (2,397); Abilene, TX
Feb 13, 2019; 7:00 pm		at Texas A&M–Corpus Christi	W 70–69	17–8 (12–0)	American Bank Center (1,118); Corpus Christi, TX
Feb 16, 2019; 4:30 pm, ESPN3		at Lamar	L 72–75	17–9 (12–1)	Montagne Center (2,822); Beaumont, TX
Feb 20, 2019; 6:30 pm		Nicholls State	W 84–74 ^{OT}	18–9 (13–1)	Bernard G. Johnson Coliseum (1,393); Huntsville, TX
Feb 23, 2019; 7:00 pm		Houston Baptist	W 119–113 ^{2OT}	19–9 (14–1)	Bernard G. Johnson Coliseum (1,350); Huntsville, TX
Feb 27, 2019; 7:00 pm		at New Orleans	W 71–60	20–9 (15–1)	Lakefront Arena (852); New Orleans, LA
Mar 6, 2019; 6:30 pm		Central Arkansas	L 87–91	20–10 (15–2)	Bernard G. Johnson Coliseum (1,167); Huntsville, TX
Mar 9, 2019; 4:30 pm, ESPN3		at Stephen F. Austin	W 68–57	21–10 (16–2)	William R. Johnson Coliseum (5,464); Nacogdoches, TX
Southland tournament
Mar 15, 2019; 5:00pm, ESPN+	(1)	vs. (4) New Orleans; Semifinals	L 76–79	21–11	Leonard E. Merrell Center; Katy, TX
NIT tournament
Mar 20, 2019*; 8:00 pm, ESPN2	(8)	at (1) TCU; First round – TCU bracket	L 69–82	21–12	Schollmaier Arena; Fort Worth, TX
*Non-conference game. (#) Tournament seedings in parentheses. All times are in Central Time.

== See also ==
- 2018–19 Sam Houston State Bearkats women's basketball team
