= 2018–19 McNeese State Cowboys basketball team =

American college basketball season

2018–19 McNeese State Cowboys basketball
- Conference: Southland Conference
- Record: 9–22 (5–13 Southland)
- Head coach: Heath Schroyer (1st season)
- Assistant coaches: John Aiken; Mike Dubose; Jalen Courtney; Kyle Drennan (Director of Operations)
- Home arena: Health and Human Performance Education Complex; Capacity (4,200)

2018–19 Southland Conference men's basketball standings
	Conf.				Overall
Team	W		L	PCT	W		L	PCT
Sam Houston State	16	–	2	.889	21	–	12	.636
Abilene Christian †	14	–	4	.778	27	–	7	.794
Southeastern Louisiana	12	–	6	.667	17	–	16	.515
New Orleans	12	–	6	.667	19	–	14	.576
Lamar	12	–	6	.667	20	–	13	.606
Texas A&M–CC	9	–	9	.500	14	–	18	.438
Central Arkansas	8	–	10	.444	14	–	19	.424
Houston Baptist	8	–	10	.444	12	–	18	.400
Stephen F. Austin	7	–	11	.389	14	–	16	.467
Nicholls	7	–	11	.389	14	–	17	.452
Northwestern State	6	–	12	.333	11	–	20	.355
McNeese State	5	–	13	.278	9	–	22	.290
Incarnate Word	1	–	17	.056	6	–	25	.194
† 2019 Southland tournament winner

The 2018–19 McNeese State Cowboys basketball team represented McNeese State University during the 2018–19 NCAA Division I men's basketball season. The Cowboys were led by 1st-year head coach Heath Schroyer and played their home games at the new on-campus Health and Human Performance Education Complex in Lake Charles, Louisiana as members of the Southland Conference.

== Previous season ==
The Cowboys finished the 2017–18 season 11–17, 8–10 in Southland play to finish in a three-way tie for eighth place. They failed to qualify for the Southland tournament.

== Roster ==
2018–19 McNeese State Cowboys men's basketball team
Players
Coaches

Pos.	#	Name	Height	Weight	Year	Hometown
C	0	Malik Hines	6 ft 10 in (2.08 m)	255 lb (116 kg)	Sr	Jackson, Mississippi
F	1	Jeremy Harrell	6 ft 7 in (2.01 m)	225 lb (102 kg)	Jr	Pickens, Mississippi
G	2	James Harvey	6 ft 2 in (1.88 m)	172 lb (78 kg)	Sr	Amite, Louisiana
F	3	Richard Laku	6 ft 8 in (2.03 m)	190 lb (86 kg)	RS Jr	Dallas, Texas
G	5	Kevin Hunt	6 ft 3 in (1.91 m)	180 lb (82 kg)	So	Little Rock, Arkansas
G	10	Jarren Greenwood	6 ft 2 in (1.88 m)	172 lb (78 kg)	Sr	Houston, Texas
G	11	Myles Hutchinson	6 ft 0 in (1.83 m)	170 lb (77 kg)	So	Abbeville, Louisiana
G	14	Trey Touchet	6 ft 2 in (1.88 m)	190 lb (86 kg)	Sr	Lafayette, Louisiana
G	22	Roydell Brown	6 ft 5 in (1.96 m)	205 lb (93 kg)	Jr	New Orleans, Louisiana
F	23	Sha'markus Kennedy	6 ft 8 in (2.03 m)	205 lb (93 kg)	Jr	Tuscaloosa, Alabama
F	24	Will Robinson	6 ft 5 in (1.96 m)	215 lb (98 kg)	Jr	Baltimore, Maryland
F	30	Adrian Brown	6 ft 7 in (2.01 m)	211 lb (96 kg)	Sr	Houston, Texas
G		Tykeem Anderson	6 ft 3 in (1.91 m)	205 lb (93 kg)	Jr	Ruston, Louisiana
F		Spencer Foley	6 ft 7 in (2.01 m)	190 lb (86 kg)	So	Chicago, Illinois
G		A.J. Lawson	6 ft 5 in (1.96 m)	195 lb (88 kg)	Jr	Bryan, Texas

Head coach

- Heath Schroyer

Assistant coach(es)

- John Aiken
- Mike Dubose
- Jalen Courtney

Legend

- (C) Team captain
- (S) Suspended
- (I) Ineligible
- (W) Walk-on
- Injured
- Current redshirt

Roster
Last update: 2018-08-24

== Schedule and results ==
Date time, TV	Opponent	Result	Record	Site (attendance) city, state
Non-conference regular season
Nov 7, 2018*; 9:00 pm	at Saint Mary's; MGM Resorts Main Event campus-site	L 65-87	0–1	McKeon Pavilion (2,673); Moraga, CA
Nov 9, 2018*; 8:00 pm, P12N	at Arizona State; MGM Resorts Main Event campus-site	L 52-80	0–2	Wells Fargo Arena (8,515); Tempe, AZ
Nov 16, 2018*; 6:30 pm	Loyola (New Orleans)	L 78–79	0–3	H&HP Complex (2,599); Lake Charles, LA
Nov 20, 2018*; 6:30 pm	Mobile	W 74–60	1–3	H&HP Complex (1,823); Lake Charles, LA
Nov 23, 2018*; 6:30 pm	Mississippi College	W 80–42	2–3	H&HP Complex (1,710); Lake Charles, LA
Nov 29, 2018*; 7:00 pm, ESPN3	at SMU	L 59–91	2–4	Moody Coliseum (5,384); University Park, TX
Dec 1, 2018*; 3:00 pm	at North Carolina Central	L 66–67	2–5	McDougald–McLendon Gymnasium (1,076); Durham, NC
Dec 4, 2018*; 7:00 pm, SECN+	at No. 22 Mississippi State	L 77–90	2–6	Humphrey Coliseum (6,347); Starkville, MS
Dec 13, 2018*; 6:30 pm	North Carolina Central	W 77–61	3–6	H&HP Complex (1,973); Lake Charles, LA
Dec 15, 2018*; 6:00 pm	at UMKC	L 67–80	3–7	Swinney Recreation Center (1,012); Kansas City, MO
Dec 18, 2018*; 6:30 pm	Louisiana	L 67–80	3–8	H&HP Complex (2,590); Lake Charles, LA
Dec 22, 2018*; 7:00 pm	at Texas–Rio Grande Valley	L 64–68	3–9	UTRGV Fieldhouse (456); Edinburg, TX
Dec 30, 2018*; 4:00 pm	Campbellsville–Harrodsburg	W 91–73	4–9	H&HP Complex (1,723); Lake Charles, LA
Southland regular season
Jan 2, 2019; 7:00 pm	at Incarnate Word	W 88–77	5–9 (1–0)	McDermott Convocation Center (170); San Antonio, TX
Jan 5, 2019; 3:00 pm	at Northwestern State	L 61–66	5–10 (1–1)	Prather Coliseum (1,620); Natchitoches, LA
Jan 9, 2019; 6:30 pm	Abilene Christian	L 72–73	5–11 (1–2)	H&HP Complex (1,782); Lake Charles, LA
Jan 12, 2019; 4:15 pm	at New Orleans	L 66–79	5–12 (1–3)	Lakefront Arena (625); New Orleans, LA
Jan 16, 2019; 6:30 pm	Nicholls State	W 86–75	6–12 (2–3)	H&HP Complex (2,278); Lake Charles, LA
Jan 19, 2019; 3:00 pm, ELVN / SLC Digital	Southeastern Louisiana	L 71–74	6–13 (2–4)	H&HP Complex (2,497); Lake Charles, LA
Jan 26, 2019; 3:00 pm, ESPN+	Houston Baptist	W 79–73	7–13 (3–4)	H&HP Complex (2,383); Lake Charles, LA
Feb 2, 2019; 3:00 pm, ELVN / SLC Digital	Lamar	L 75–84	7–14 (3–5)	H&HP Complex (2,492); Lake Charles, LA
Feb 6, 2019; 6:30 pm, ESPN3	at Sam Houston State	L 62–77	7–15 (3–6)	Bernard G. Johnson Coliseum (1,193); Huntsville, TX
Feb 9, 2019; 3:00 pm	Northwestern State	L 72–74	7–16 (3–7)	H&HP Complex (2,722); Lake Charles, LA
Feb 13, 2019; 6:30 pm, ESPN+	at Stephen F. Austin	L 57–67	7–17 (3–8)	William R. Johnson Coliseum (3,158); Nacogdoches, TX
Feb 16, 2019; 4:00 pm	at Southeastern Louisiana	L 52–88	7–18 (3–9)	University Center (884); Hammond, LA
Feb 20, 2019; 6:30 pm	Central Arkansas	W 83–75	8–18 (4–9)	H&HP Complex (2,021); Lake Charles, LA
Feb 23, 2019; 3:00 pm	New Orleans	L 51–60	8–19 (4–10)	H&HP Complex (2,221); Lake Charles, LA
Feb 27, 2019	at Nicholls State	W 84–75	9–19 (5–10)	Stopher Gym (305); Thibodaux, LA
Mar 2, 2019; 7:00 pm	at Houston Baptist	L 65–86	9–20 (5–11)	Sharp Gymnasium (781); Houston, TX
Mar 6, 2019; 6:30 pm	Texas A&M–Corpus Christi	L 50–59	9–21 (5–12)	H&HP Complex (2,426); Lake Charles, LA
Mar 9, 2019; 4:30 pm, ESPN+	at Lamar	L 58–83	9–22 (5–13)	Montagne Center (5,218); Beaumont, TX
*Non-conference game. ^{#}Rankings from AP Poll. (#) Tournament seedings in parentheses. All times are in Central Time.

== See also ==
- 2018–19 McNeese State Cowgirls basketball team
