= 2018–19 Houston Baptist Huskies men's basketball team =

College basketball season

2018–19 Houston Baptist Huskies men's basketball
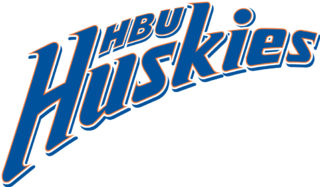
- Conference: Southland Conference
- Record: 12–18 (8–10 Southland)
- Head coach: Ron Cottrell (28th season)
- Assistant coaches: Steven Key; Justin "Jud" Kinne; Keith Berard
- Home arena: Sharp Gymnasium

2018–19 Southland Conference men's basketball standings
| | Conf. | | | | Overall |
| Team | W | | L | PCT | W | | L | PCT |
|---|---|---|---|---|---|---|---|---|
| Sam Houston State | 16 | – | 2 | .889 | 21 | – | 12 | .636 |
| Abilene Christian † | 14 | – | 4 | .778 | 27 | – | 7 | .794 |
| Southeastern Louisiana | 12 | – | 6 | .667 | 17 | – | 16 | .515 |
| New Orleans | 12 | – | 6 | .667 | 19 | – | 14 | .576 |
| Lamar | 12 | – | 6 | .667 | 20 | – | 13 | .606 |
| Texas A&M–CC | 9 | – | 9 | .500 | 14 | – | 18 | .438 |
| Central Arkansas | 8 | – | 10 | .444 | 14 | – | 19 | .424 |
| Houston Baptist | 8 | – | 10 | .444 | 12 | – | 18 | .400 |
| Stephen F. Austin | 7 | – | 11 | .389 | 14 | – | 16 | .467 |
| Nicholls | 7 | – | 11 | .389 | 14 | – | 17 | .452 |
| Northwestern State | 6 | – | 12 | .333 | 11 | – | 20 | .355 |
| McNeese State | 5 | – | 13 | .278 | 9 | – | 22 | .290 |
| Incarnate Word | 1 | – | 17 | .056 | 6 | – | 25 | .194 |
† 2019 Southland tournament winner

The 2018–19 Houston Baptist Huskies men's basketball team represent Houston Baptist University in the 2018–19 NCAA Division I men's basketball season. They are led by head coach Ron Cottrell in his 28th season at HBU. The Huskies play their home games at Sharp Gymnasium as members of the Southland Conference.

== Previous season ==
The Huskies finished the 2017–18 season 6–25, 2–16 in Southland play to finish in a tie for 11th place. They failed to qualify for the Southland tournament.

== Roster ==
2018–19 Houston Baptist Huskies men's basketball team
Players
Coaches

| Pos. | # | Name | Height | Weight | Year | Hometown |
|---|---|---|---|---|---|---|
| G | 0 | Ian DuBose | 6 ft 3 in (1.91 m) | 220 lb (100 kg) | So | Durham, North Carolina |
| F | 2 | Philip McKenzie | 6 ft 4 in (1.93 m) | 185 lb (84 kg) | So | Nassau, Bahamas |
| F | 3 | Jackson Stent | 6 ft 8 in (2.03 m) | 215 lb (98 kg) | Jr | Christchurch, New Zealand |
| G | 4 | Stephen O'Suji | 6 ft 0 in (1.83 m) | 190 lb (86 kg) | RS Sr | Houston, Texas |
| G | 10 | Ty Dalton | 6 ft 4 in (1.93 m) | 205 lb (93 kg) | So | Houston, Texas |
| G | 13 | Qon Murphy | 6 ft 5 in (1.96 m) | 190 lb (86 kg) | Fr | Cornelius, North Carolina |
| C | 15 | Edward Hardt | 6 ft 10 in (2.08 m) | 245 lb (111 kg) | Sr | Phoenix, Arizona |
| G | 22 | Jalon Gates | 6 ft 0 in (1.83 m) | 155 lb (70 kg) | Jr | Selma, Texas |
| G | 23 | Oliver Lynch-Daniels | 6 ft 2 in (1.88 m) | 180 lb (82 kg) | So | Chapel Hill, North Carolina |
| G | 30 | Braxton Bonds | 6 ft 2 in (1.88 m) | 175 lb (79 kg) | RS Sr | Nashville, Tennessee |
| F | 32 | Benjamin Uloko | 6 ft 7 in (2.01 m) | 260 lb (118 kg) | Fr | Clemmons, North Carolina |
| C | 44 | Josh Ibarra | 6 ft 11 in (2.11 m) | 250 lb (113 kg) | RS Sr | Angleton, Texas |
| C | 50 | Ryan Gomes | 6 ft 10 in (2.08 m) | 240 lb (109 kg) | Jr | Westminster, Maryland |

Head coach

- Ron Cottrell (Arkansas)

Assistant coach(es)

- Steven Key (Houston Baptist)
- Jud Kinne (Albion)
- Keith Berard (Southern Utah)

Legend

- (C) Team captain
- (S) Suspended
- (I) Ineligible
- (W) Walk-on
- Injured
- Current redshirt

Roster
Last update: August 24, 2018

== Schedule and results ==
| Date time, TV | Rank^{#} | Opponent^{#} | Result | Record | Site (attendance) city, state |
Non-conference regular season
| Nov 7, 2018*; 8:00 pm, P12N | | at Arizona; Maui Invitational Tournament campus-site game | L 60–90 | 0–1 | McKale Center (13,749); Tucson, AZ |
| Nov 10, 2018*; 7:00 pm | | Fordham | W 75–72 | 1–1 | Sharp Gymnasium (748); Houston, TX |
| Nov 17, 2018*; 7:00 pm, BTN/BTN Plus | | at Wisconsin | L 59–96 | 1–2 | Kohl Center (17,095); Madison, WI |
| Nov 23, 2018*; 2:00 pm, ACC+ | | at Wake Forest | W 93–91 ^{OT} | 2–2 | Lawrence Joel Veterans Memorial Coliseum (5,109); Winston-Salem, NC |
| Nov 26, 2018*; 7:00 pm | | UTSA | L 82–86 | 2–3 | Sharp Gymnasium (814); Houston, TX |
| Dec 1, 2018*; 7:00 pm | | at Louisiana Tech | L 78–85 | 2–4 | Thomas Assembly Center (1,704); Ruston, LA |
| Dec 8, 2018*; 4:00 pm, ESPN+ | | at Texas State | L 80–90 | 2–5 | Strahan Coliseum (2,103); San Marcos, TX |
| Dec 14, 2018*; 7:00 pm | | Arlington Baptist | W 107–70 | 3–5 | Sharp Gymnasium (601); Houston, TX |
| Dec 17, 2018*; 6:30 pm | | at Samford | L 61–85 | 3–6 | Pete Hanna Center (704); Birmingham, AL |
| Dec 19, 2018*; 6:00 pm, ACC+ | | at Miami (FL) | L 73–80 | 3–7 | Watsco Center (6,553); Coral Gables, FL |
| Dec 29, 2018*; 7:00 pm | | Dallas Christian | W 143–92 | 4–7 | Sharp Gymnasium (363); Houston, TX |
Southland regular season
| Jan 2, 2019; 7:00 pm | | Lamar | W 88–82 ^{OT} | 5–7 (1–0) | Sharp Gymnasium (683); Houston, TX |
| Jan 5, 2019; 2:00 pm | | at New Orleans | L 76–81 ^{OT} | 5–8 (1–1) | Lakefront Arena (553); New Orleans, LA |
| Jan 12, 2019; 3:30 pm | | at Nicholls State | L 76–77 | 5–9 (1–2) | Stopher Gym (367); Thibodaux, LA |
| Jan 16, 2019; 7:00 pm | | at Abilene Christian | L 68–75 | 5–10 (1–3) | Moody Coliseum (1,169); Abilene, TX |
| Jan 19, 2019; 7:00 pm | | Sam Houston State | L 65–71 | 5–11 (1–4) | Sharp Gymnasium (948); Houston, TX |
| Jan 23, 2019; 7:00 pm | | Southeastern Louisiana | L 67–70 | 5–12 (1–5) | Sharp Gymnasium (678); Houston, TX |
| Jan 26, 2019; 3:00 pm, ESPN+ | | at McNeese State | L 73–79 | 5–13 (1–6) | H&HP Complex (2,383); Lake Charles, LA |
| Jan 30, 2019; 7:00 pm | | at Incarnate Word | W 96–92 | 6–13 (2–6) | McDermott Convocation Center (231); San Antonio, TX |
| Feb 2, 2019; 7:00 pm | | Texas A&M–Corpus Christi | W 73–72 | 7–13 (3–6) | Sharp Gymnasium (1,000); Houston, TX |
| Feb 6, 2019; 7:00 pm | | Stephen F. Austin | L 77–79 | 7–14 (3–7) | Sharp Gymnasium (908); Houston, TX |
| Feb 13, 2019; 7:00 pm | | at Central Arkansas | W 75–71 | 8–14 (4–7) | Farris Center (515); Conway, AR |
| Feb 16, 2019; 7:00 pm, ELVN / SLC Digital | | Nicholls State | W 88–82 | 9–14 (5–7) | Sharp Gymnasium (611); Houston, TX |
| Feb 20, 2019; 7:00 pm | | Northwestern State | W 92–54 | 10–14 (6–7) | Sharp Gymnasium (634); Houston, TX |
| Feb 23, 2019; 7:00 pm | | at Sam Houston State | L 113–119 ^{2OT} | 10–15 (6–8) | Bernard G. Johnson Coliseum (1,350); Huntsville, TX |
| Feb 27, 2019; 7:00 pm, ESPN+ | | at Lamar | L 75–110 | 10–16 (6–9) | Montagne Center (2,863); Beaumont, TX |
| Mar 2, 2019; 7:00 pm | | McNeese State | W 86–65 | 11–16 (7–9) | Sharp Gymnasium (781); Houston, TX |
| Mar 6, 2019; 7:00 pm | | Incarnate Word | W 118–111 | 12–16 (8–9) | Sharp Gymnasium (684); Houston, TX |
| Mar 9, 2019; 5:00 pm | | at Texas A&M–Corpus Christi | L 69–76 | 12–17 (8–10) | American Bank Center (1,059); Corpus Christi, TX |
Southland tournament
| Mar 13, 2019; 7:30 pm, ESPN+ | (8) | vs. (5) Lamar; First round | L 79–81 | 12–18 | Leonard E. Merrill Center (1,650); Katy, TX |
*Non-conference game. ^{#}Rankings from AP Poll. (#) Tournament seedings in parentheses. All times are in Central.

== See also ==
- 2018–19 Houston Baptist Huskies women's basketball team
