= 2018–19 Lamar Cardinals basketball team =

American college basketball season

2018–19 Lamar Cardinals basketball
- Conference: Southland Conference
- Record: 20–13 (12–6 Southland)
- Head coach: Tic Price (5th season)
- Associate head coach: Bobby Kummer (5th season)
- Assistant coaches: David Dumars (1st season); Brandon Chappell (2nd season)
- Home arena: Montagne Center (Capacity: 10,080)

2018–19 Southland Conference men's basketball standings
	Conf.				Overall
Team	W		L	PCT	W		L	PCT
Sam Houston State	16	–	2	.889	21	–	12	.636
Abilene Christian †	14	–	4	.778	27	–	7	.794
Southeastern Louisiana	12	–	6	.667	17	–	16	.515
New Orleans	12	–	6	.667	19	–	14	.576
Lamar	12	–	6	.667	20	–	13	.606
Texas A&M–CC	9	–	9	.500	14	–	18	.438
Central Arkansas	8	–	10	.444	14	–	19	.424
Houston Baptist	8	–	10	.444	12	–	18	.400
Stephen F. Austin	7	–	11	.389	14	–	16	.467
Nicholls	7	–	11	.389	14	–	17	.452
Northwestern State	6	–	12	.333	11	–	20	.355
McNeese State	5	–	13	.278	9	–	22	.290
Incarnate Word	1	–	17	.056	6	–	25	.194
† 2019 Southland tournament winner

The 2018–19 Lamar Cardinals basketball team represented Lamar University during the 2018–19 NCAA Division I men's basketball season. The Cardinals were led by fifth-year head coach Tic Price and played their home games at the Montagne Center in Beaumont, Texas as members of the Southland Conference.

The Cardinals finished conference play with as 12–6 record in a three-way tie with New Orleans and Southeastern Louisiana for third place. The team qualified for the 2019 Southland Conference men's basketball tournament as the fifth seeded team. They won the first-round game against eighth seed Houston Baptist by a score of 81–79. The season ended when the Cardinals were eliminated in the second round by fourth seed New Orleans with a score of 72–76.

== Previous season ==
The Cardinals finished the 2017–18 season 19–14, 11–7 in Southland play to finish in a tie for fifth place. They lost in the first round of the Southland tournament to Central Arkansas. They were invited to the CollegeInsider.com Tournament where they lost in the first round to UTSA.

== Offseason ==
=== Coaching changes ===
- Justin Bailey, assistant basketball coach at Lamar from 2016–2018, accepted the head coach position at University of Arkansas–Fort Smith.
- David Dumars joined the Lamar Cardinals basketball staff as assistant coach on August 20, 2018. Dumars had been assistant coach / associate head coach on the McNeese State Cowboys basketball staff from 2002–2018.

=== Departures ===
Name	Position	Height	Weight	Year	Hometown	Reason for Departure
Zjori Bosha	G	6'5"	177	SR	Nome, TX	Graduated
Joey Frenchwood	G	6'1"	184	SR	Nederland, TX	Graduated
James Harrison	F	6'5"	200	SR-TR	Jacksonville, FL	Graduated
Terry Noel	G	5'10"	190	SR	Midwest City, OK	Graduated
Colton Weisbrod	F	6'5"	218	SR	Nederland, TX	Graduated

=== Player additions ===
Three players signed letters of intent during the early signing period. Christian Barrett, a transfer, played at Jacksonville College. Barrett will play forward. Davion Buster and Gehlon Easter were high school recruits. Both will play guard. Another transfer, Edwin Jeudy, was announced on March 17, 2018. Jeudy will be transferring from Gillette College. He was ranked number 78 in the 2018 Junior College Basketball Top 100 Player Rankings.

Incoming transfers

Name	Number	Position	Height	Weight	Year	Hometown	Previous School
Christian Barrett		PF	6'6"	220	Junior	Houston, Texas	Junior college transferred from Jacksonville College
Edwin Jeudy		PF	6'7"	210	Junior	Montreal, Canada	Junior college transferred from Gillette College

2018–19 recruiting class

College recruiting information
Name	Hometown	School	Height	Weight	Commit date
Davion Buster; G	Austin, TX	Lanier HS	5 ft 10 in (1.78 m)	150 lb (68 kg)	Jul 3, 2017
Davion Buster; G	Recruit ratings: No ratings found				
Gehlon Easter; G	Little Rock, AR	Mills HS	6 ft 3 in (1.91 m)	172 lb (78 kg)	Nov 8, 2017
Gehlon Easter; G	Recruit ratings: No ratings found				
Overall recruit ranking:
Note: In many cases, Scout, Rivals, 247Sports, On3, and ESPN may conflict in their listings of height and weight.; In these cases, the average was taken. ESPN grades are on a 100-point scale.; Sources:

== Roster ==
2018–19 Lamar Cardinals men's basketball team
Players
Coaches

Pos.	#	Name	Height	Weight	Year	Hometown
G	0	Jordan Hunter	5 ft 11 in (1.8 m)	180 lb (82 kg)	Jr	Beaumont, TX
G	1	Mike Kolawole	6 ft 5 in (1.96 m)	195 lb (88 kg)	Jr	Rowlett, Texas
G	2	Grehlon Easter	6 ft 3 in (1.91 m)	172 lb (78 kg)	Fr	Little Rock, Arkansas
G	3	Nick Garth	6 ft 0 in (1.83 m)	191 lb (87 kg)	Sr	Houston, Texas
F/C	5	Avery Sullivan	6 ft 8 in (2.03 m)	220 lb (100 kg)	So	Pflugerville, Texas
F	11	Josh Nzeakor	6 ft 8 in (2.03 m)	225 lb (102 kg)	Sr	Mesquite, Texas
G	12	V.J. Holmes	6 ft 4 in (1.93 m)	185 lb (84 kg)	Jr	Jupiter, Florida
G	13	Davion Buster	5 ft 10 in (1.78 m)	150 lb (68 kg)	Fr	Austin, Texas
F	14	Edwin Jeudy	6 ft 7 in (2.01 m)	210 lb (95 kg)	Jr	Montreal, Quebec, Canada
G/F	15	T. J. Atwood	6 ft 6 in (1.98 m)	203 lb (92 kg)	Jr	Beaumont, Texas
F	22	Christian Barrett	6 ft 6 in (1.98 m)	220 lb (100 kg)	Jr	Houston, Texas
C	23	Jordan Foster	6 ft 9 in (2.06 m)	225 lb (102 kg)	So	Lafayette, Louisiana
G	24	Laquarious Paige	6 ft 3 in (1.91 m)	180 lb (82 kg)	Jr	West Orange, Texas

Head coach

- Tic Price (Virginia Tech)

Assistant coach(es)

- Bobby Kummer (Charlotte)
- David Dumars (Louisiana–Monroe)
- Brandon Chappell (Lamar)

Legend

- (C) Team captain
- (S) Suspended
- (I) Ineligible
- (W) Walk-on
- Injured
- Current redshirt

Roster
Last update: September 10, 2018

== TV and radio media ==
All Lamar games will be broadcast on KLVI, also known as News Talk 560.

Live video of all home games (except those picked up by Southland Conference TV agreements) will be streamed on ESPN3.

== Schedule and results ==
Date time, TV	Rank^{#}	Opponent^{#}	Result	Record	Site (attendance) city, state
Non-conference regular season
Nov 6, 2018*; 7:00 pm, ESPN3		Huston–Tillotson	W 79–59	1–0	Montagne Center (1,559); Beaumont, TX
Nov 9, 2018*; 6:30 pm, ACC+		at Georgia Tech; Deep South Showcase	L 69–88	1–1	McCamish Pavilion (4,691); Atlanta, GA
Nov 11, 2018*; 3:00 pm, ESPN3		at East Carolina; Deep South Showcase	L 78–84 ^{OT}	1–2	Williams Arena at Minges Coliseum (3,104); Greenville, NC
Nov 17, 2018*; 2:00 pm, ESPN3		Prairie View A&M; Deep South Showcase	W 74–67	2–2	Montagne Center (1,837); Beaumont, TX
Nov 19, 2018*; 7:00 pm, ESPN+		Arlington Baptist	W 105–40	3–2	Montagne Center (1,758); Beaumont, TX
Nov 23, 2018*; 7:00 pm		at Texas–Rio Grande Valley; Deep South Showcase	L 75–77	3–3	UTRGV Fieldhouse (424); Edinburg, TX
Nov 27, 2018*; 7:00 pm, ESPN3		at SMU	L 65–79	3–4	Moody Coliseum (5,611); University Park, TX
Dec 1, 2018*; 4:30 pm, ESPN3		at Rice	W 75–68	4–4	Tudor Fieldhouse (1,926); Houston, TX
Dec 4, 2018*; 7:00 pm, ESPN3		at Houston	L 56–79	4–5	Fertitta Center (5,587); Houston, TX
Dec 13, 2018*; 9:00 pm, ESPN3		at Cal State Bakersfield	L 65–86	4–6	Icardo Center (1,794); Bakersfield, CA
Dec 19, 2018*; 7:00 pm, ESPN+		Texas Southern	W 80–72	5–6	Montagne Center (1,846); Beaumont, TX
Dec 21, 2018*; 7:00 pm, ESPN3		Howard Payne	W 121–32	6–6	Montagne Center (1,367); Beaumont, TX
Dec 29, 2018*; 2:00 pm, ESPN+		Champion Christian	W 122–58	7–6	Montagne Center (1,829); Beaumont, TX
Southland Conference regular season
Jan 2, 2019; 7:00 pm		at Houston Baptist	L 82–88 ^{OT}	7–7 (0–1)	Sharp Gymnasium (683); Houston, TX
Jan 5, 2019; 4:30 pm, ESPN3		Texas A&M–Corpus Christi	W 61–55	8–7 (1–1)	Montagne Center; Beaumont, TX
Jan 9, 2019; 7:00 pm, ESPN+		New Orleans	L 71–78 ^{OT}	8–8 (1–2)	Montagne Center (1,537); Beaumont, TX
Jan 12, 2019; 4:00 pm, ELVN / SLC Digital		at Central Arkansas	L 68–75	8–9 (1–3)	Farris Center (714); Conway, AR
Jan 16, 2019; 7:00 pm		at Southeastern Louisiana	L 69–76	8–10 (1–4)	University Center (605); Hammond, LA
Jan 23, 2019; 7:00 pm, ESPN+		Incarnate Word	L 81–87 ^{OT}	9–10 (2–4)	Montagne Center (2,464); Beaumont, TX
Jan 26, 2019; 5:30 pm, ESPN3		at Sam Houston State	L 59–69	9–11 (2–5)	Bernard G. Johnson Coliseum; Huntsville, TX
Jan 30, 2019; 7:00 pm		at Nicholls State	W 90–69	10–11 (3–5)	Stopher Gymnasium (315); Thibodaux, LA
Feb 2, 2019; 3:00 pm, ELVN / SLC Digital		at McNeese State	W 84–75	11–11 (4–5)	H&HP Complex (2,492); Lake Charles, LA
Feb 6, 2019; 7:00 pm, ESPN+		Abilene Christian	L 64–75	11–12 (4–6)	Montagne Center (2,438); Beaumont, TX
Feb 9, 2019; 4:30 pm, ESPN3		at Stephen F. Austin	W 82–67	12–12 (5–6)	William R. Johnson Coliseum (5,752); Nacogdoches, TX
Feb 13, 2019; 7:00 pm, ESPN+		Northwestern State	W 75–70	13–12 (6–6)	Montagne Center (1,860); Beaumont, TX
Feb 16, 2019; 4:30 pm, ESPN3		Sam Houston State	W 75–72	14–12 (7–6)	Montagne Center (2,855); Beaumont, TX
Feb 20, 2019; 7:00 pm		at Incarnate Word	W 87–81 ^{OT}	15–12 (8–6)	McDermott Convocation Center (2,464); San Antonio, TX
Feb 23, 2019; 3:30 pm		at Texas A&M–Corpus Christi	W 63–58	16–12 (9–6)	American Bank Center (1,250); Corpus Christi, TX
Feb 27, 2019; 7:00 pm, ESPN+		Houston Baptist	W 110–75	17–12 (10–6)	Montagne Center (2,863); Beaumont, TX
Mar 2, 2019; 4:30 pm, ESPN+		Stephen F. Austin	W 81–79	18–12 (11–6)	Montagne Center (3,551); Beaumont, TX
Mar 9, 2019; 4:30 pm, ESPN+		McNeese State	W 83–58	19–12 (12–6)	Montagne Center (5,218); Beaumont, TX
Southland tournament
Mar 13, 2019; 5:00 pm, ESPN+	(5)	vs. (8) Houston Baptist; First round	W 81–79	20–12	Leonard E. Merrell Center; Katy, TX
Mar 14, 2019; 5:00 pm, ESPN+	(5)	vs. (4) New Orleans; Second round	L 72–76	20–13	Leonard E. Merrell Center; Katy, TX
*Non-conference game. ^{#}Rankings from AP Poll. (#) Tournament seedings in parentheses. All times are in Central Time.

== Awards and honors ==
=== Player of the week ===
- Dec. 27 – Nick Garth
- Feb. 4 – Christian Barrett
- Feb. 18 – Nick Garth
- Mar. 4 – Nick Garth

=== SLC All-Conference Team ===
- First team - Nick Garth
- Second team - Josh Nzeakor

=== SLC tournament team ===
Josh Nzeakor was named to the SLC Tournament team.

== See also ==
2018–19 Lamar Lady Cardinals basketball team
