= 2018–19 Incarnate Word Cardinals men's basketball team =

American college basketball season

2018–19 Incarnate Word Cardinals men's basketball
- Conference: Southland Conference
- Record: 6–25 (1–17 Southland)
- Head coach: Carson Cunningham (1st season)
- Assistant coaches: Kenyon Spears; Darnel Archey; Taylor Land; Ryan Imhoff
- Home arena: McDermott Convocation Center (Capacity: 2,000)

2018–19 Southland Conference men's basketball standings
	Conf.				Overall
Team	W		L	PCT	W		L	PCT
Sam Houston State	16	–	2	.889	21	–	12	.636
Abilene Christian †	14	–	4	.778	27	–	7	.794
Southeastern Louisiana	12	–	6	.667	17	–	16	.515
New Orleans	12	–	6	.667	19	–	14	.576
Lamar	12	–	6	.667	20	–	13	.606
Texas A&M–CC	9	–	9	.500	14	–	18	.438
Central Arkansas	8	–	10	.444	14	–	19	.424
Houston Baptist	8	–	10	.444	12	–	18	.400
Stephen F. Austin	7	–	11	.389	14	–	16	.467
Nicholls	7	–	11	.389	14	–	17	.452
Northwestern State	6	–	12	.333	11	–	20	.355
McNeese State	5	–	13	.278	9	–	22	.290
Incarnate Word	1	–	17	.056	6	–	25	.194
† 2019 Southland tournament winner

The 2018–19 Incarnate Word Cardinals men's basketball team represent the University of the Incarnate Word during the 2018–19 NCAA Division I men's basketball season. The Cardinals are led by 1st-year head coach Carson Cunningham and play their home games at McDermott Convocation Center in San Antonio, Texas as members of the Southland Conference.

== Previous season ==
The Cardinals finished the 2017–18 season 7–21, 2–16 in Southland play to finish in a tie for 11th place. They failed to qualify for the Southland tournament.

The season marked the Cardinals' first full season as a Division I school after a four-year transition period from Division II to Division I and were thus eligible for postseason play.

== Roster ==
2018–19 Incarnate Word Cardinals men's basketball team
Players
Coaches

Pos.	#	Name	Height	Weight	Year	Previous school	Hometown
G	0	Dwight Murray, Jr.	6 ft 0 in (1.83 m)	165 lb (75 kg)	Fr	Pebblebrook HS	Austell, Georgia
F	1	Antoine Smith Jr.	6 ft 7 in (2.01 m)	215 lb (98 kg)	Fr	Bosco Institute	Westerville, Ohio
G	2	Jordan Caruso	6 ft 3 in (1.91 m)	178 lb (81 kg)	Fr	Staten Island Prep	New York City, New York
F	4	Christian Peevy	6 ft 6 in (1.98 m)	185 lb (84 kg)	RS So	Mount Carmel HS	Chicago, Illinois
G	5	Romello Wilbert	6 ft 2 in (1.88 m)	185 lb (84 kg)	Fr	The Woodlands HS	The Woodlands, Texas
G	10	Cody Graham	5 ft 10 in (1.78 m)	165 lb (75 kg)	So	St. Pius X HS	Fresno, Texas
G	11	Des Balentine	6 ft 0 in (1.83 m)	178 lb (81 kg)	Jr	Tyler JC	Kokomo, Indiana
G	12	Augustine Ene	6 ft 4 in (1.93 m)	205 lb (93 kg)	So	Creekview HS	Carrollton, Texas
F	13	Charles Brown III	6 ft 7 in (2.01 m)	215 lb (98 kg)	Sr	Murray State	New Orleans, Louisiana
G	14	Keaton Hervey	6 ft 7 in (2.01 m)	190 lb (86 kg)	So	Cedar Park HS	Cedar Park, Texas
G	20	Morgan Taylor	6 ft 3 in (1.91 m)	174 lb (79 kg)	Fr	Marist HS	Chicago, Illinois
F	21	Corey Sato	6 ft 6 in (1.98 m)	190 lb (86 kg)	Fr	Randall HS	Amarillo, Texas
G	23	Jorden Kite	6 ft 3 in (1.91 m)	185 lb (84 kg)	RS Jr	Clark HS	San Antonio, Texas
F	24	Bryce Davis	6 ft 7 in (2.01 m)	215 lb (98 kg)	Fr	Deer Valley HS	Glendale, Arizona
G	25	Brandon Swaby	6 ft 3 in (1.91 m)	185 lb (84 kg)	Fr	Northeast HS	Fort Lauderdale, Florida

Head coach

- Carson Cunningham (Purdue)

Assistant coach(es)

- Kenyon Spears (Lamar)
- Darnel Archey (Butler)
- Taylor Land (St. Edward's)
- Ryan Imhoff (Carroll College)

Legend

- (C) Team captain
- (S) Suspended
- (I) Ineligible
- (W) Walk-on
- Injured
- Current redshirt

Roster
Last update: 2018-10-26

== Schedule and results ==
Date time, TV	Opponent	Result	Record	High points	High rebounds	High assists	Site (attendance) city, state
Non-conference regular season
Nov 6, 2018*; 6:30 pm, FSSW+	at Texas Tech	L 37–87	0–1	16 – Smith Jr.	4 – 3 Tied	2 – Tied	United Supermarkets Arena (10,198); Lubbock, TX
Nov 9, 2018*; 7:00 pm	St. Francis	W 63–49	1–1	14 – Brown III	7 – Smith Jr.	3 – Caruso	McDermott Convocation Center (422); San Antonio, TX
Nov 10, 2018*; 7:00 pm	UT Tyler	W 66–54	2–1	19 – Taylor	6 – Smith Jr.	4 – Tied	McDermott Convocation Center (642); San Antonio, TX
Nov 12, 2018*; 7:00 pm	Texas Lutheran	W 70–59	3–1	23 – Taylor	9 – Smith Jr.	4 – Taylor	McDermott Convocation Center (350); San Antonio, TX
Nov 16, 2018*; 10:00 am	vs. Montana; The Islands of the Bahamas Showcase	L 66–93	3–2	12 – Tied	6 – Tied	4 – Taylor	Kendal G. L. Isaacs National Gymnasium (225); Nassau, Bahamas
Nov 17, 2018*; 10:00 a.m.	vs. North Dakota State; The Islands of the Bahamas Showcase	W 80–78 ^{OT}	4–2	24 – Taylor	6 – Peevy	4 – Murray Jr.	Kendal G. L. Isaacs National Gymnasium; Nassau, Bahamas
Nov 18, 2018*; 1:00 p.m.	vs. Florida Atlantic; The Islands of the Bahamas Showcase	L 68–71	4–3	18 – Ene	4 – Tied	6 – Taylor	Kendal G. L. Isaacs National Gymnasium (263); Nassau, Bahamas
Nov 21, 2018*; 7:00 pm	Northern Colorado	L 64–90	4–4	26 – Peevy	7 – Ene	2 – 4 Tied	McDermott Convocation Center (705); San Antonio, TX
Nov 25, 2018*; 2:00 pm	at SIU Edwardsville	L 68–80	4–5	32 – Peevy	6 – Ene	4 – Murray Jr.	Vadalabene Center (1,011); Edwardsville, IL
Dec 4, 2018*; 7:00 pm	Trinity	W 82–57	5–5	23 – Peevy	11 – Peevy	3 – 2 Tied	McDermott Convocation Center; San Antonio, TX
Dec 9, 2018*; 1:00 pm, SECN	at LSU	L 50–91	5–6	16 – Peevy	4 – 2 Tied	3 – 2 Tied	Pete Maravich Assembly Center (9,098); Baton Rouge, LA
Dec 17, 2018*; 7:00 pm, ESPN+	at UIC	L 57–63	5–7	14 – Brown III	6 – Davis	4 – Taylor	Credit Union 1 Arena (1,152); Chicago, IL
Dec 19, 2018*; 7:30 pm, FS2	at DePaul	L 71–81	5–8	27 – Brown III	6 – Smith Jr.	5 – Taylor	Wintrust Arena (3,705); Chicago, IL
Southland regular season
Jan 2, 2019; 7:00 pm	McNeese State	L 77–88	5–9 (0–1)	18 – Murray	3 – Tied	3 – Tied	McDermott Convocation Center (170); San Antonio, TX
Jan 5, 2019; 7:00 pm	Nicholls State	W 65–58	6–9 (1–1)	17 – Tied	7 – Brown	7 – Murray	McDermott Convocation Center (301); San Antonio, TX
Jan 12, 2019; 5:30 pm	at Sam Houston State	L 52–66	6–10 (1–2)	18 – Murray	12 – Smith	2 – Graham	Bernard G. Johnson Coliseum (703); Huntsville, TX
Jan 16, 2019; 7:00 pm	Central Arkansas	L 60–77	6–11 (1–3)	18 – Ene	6 – Ene	2 – Smith Jr.	McDermott Convocation Center (421); San Antonio, TX
Jan 19, 2019; 3:00 pm, ESPN3	Stephen F. Austin	L 71–74	6–12 (1–4)	16 – Peevy	6 – Brown	7 – Taylor	McDermott Convocation Center (1,139); San Antonio, TX
Jan 23, 2019; 7:00 pm, ESPN+	at Lamar	L 81–87 ^{OT}	6–13 (1–5)	26 – Peevy	7 – Peevy	6 – Murray Jr.	Montagne Center (2,464); Beaumont, TX
Jan 26, 2019; 3:00 pm, ELVN / SLC Digital	New Orleans	L 52–61	6–14 (1–6)	20 – Peevy	11 – Peevy	3 – Tied	McDermott Convocation Center (507); San Antonio, TX
Jan 30, 2019; 7:00 pm	Houston Baptist	L 92–96	6–15 (1–7)	20 – Murray Jr.	5 – Tied	4 – 3 Tied	McDermott Convocation Center (231); San Antonio, TX
Feb 2, 2019; 4:15 pm	at New Orleams	L 72–89	6–16 (1–8)	25 – Peevy	7 – Wilbert	3 – Tied	Lakefront Arena (652); New Orleans, LA
Feb 9, 2019; 7:00 p.m.	at Texas A&M–Corpus Christi	L 61–70	6–17 (1–9)	22 – Peevy	5 – Tied	2 – Tied	American Bank Center (2,318); Corpus Christi, TX
Feb 13, 2019; 7:00 pm	at Southeastern Louisiana	L 64–70	6–18 (1–10)	23 – Brown	8 – Peevy	4 – Graham	University Center (666); Hammond, LA
Feb 16, 2019; 7:00 pm	Abilene Christian	L 48–68	6–19 (1–11)	13 – Ene	8 – Ene	2 – Tied	McDermott Convocation Center (739); San Antonio, TX
Feb 20, 2019; 7:00 pm	Lamar	L 81–87 ^{OT}	6–20 (1–12)	26 – Peevy	7 – Peevy	6 – Murray	McDermott Convocation Center (2,464); San Antonio, TX
Feb 23, 2019; 4:30 pm	at Stephen F. Austin	L 54–81	6–21 (1–13)	17 – Ene	6 – Wilbert	5 – Graham	William R. Johnson Coliseum (3,803); Nacogdoches, TX
Feb 27, 2019; 6:30 pm	at Northwestern State	L 60–68	6–22 (1–14)	21 – Smith	7 – Ene	6 – Murray	Prather Coliseum (1,124); Natchitoches, LA
Mar 2, 2019; 7:00 pm	Texas A&M–Corpus Christi	L 72–74 ^{OT}	6–23 (1–15)	17 – Peevy	6 – Ene	6 – Graham	McDermott Convocation Center (860); San Antonio Texas
Mar 6, 2019; 7:00 pm	at Houston Baptist	L 111–118	6–24 (1–16)	29 – Peevy	6 – Peevy	5 – Caruso	Sharp Gymnasium (684); Houston, TX
Mar 9, 2019; 3:30 pm	at Abilene Christian	L 52–81	6–25 (1–17)	13 – Ene	5 – Peevy	4 – Ene	Moody Coliseum (1,501); Abilene, TX
*Non-conference game. ^{#}Rankings from AP Poll. (#) Tournament seedings in parentheses. All times are in Central Time.

== See also ==
- 2018–19 Incarnate Word Cardinals women's basketball team
