= 2018–19 Central Arkansas Bears basketball team =

American college basketball season

2018–19 Central Arkansas Bears basketball
- Conference: Southland Conference
- Record: 14–19 (8–10 Southland)
- Head coach: Russ Pennell (5th season)
- Assistant coaches: Anthony Boone (5th season); Matt Scherbenske; Tyler Miller (2nd season)
- Home arena: Farris Center (Capacity: 6,000)

2018–19 Southland Conference men's basketball standings
| | Conf. | | | | Overall |
| Team | W | | L | PCT | W | | L | PCT |
|---|---|---|---|---|---|---|---|---|
| Sam Houston State | 16 | – | 2 | .889 | 21 | – | 12 | .636 |
| Abilene Christian † | 14 | – | 4 | .778 | 27 | – | 7 | .794 |
| Southeastern Louisiana | 12 | – | 6 | .667 | 17 | – | 16 | .515 |
| New Orleans | 12 | – | 6 | .667 | 19 | – | 14 | .576 |
| Lamar | 12 | – | 6 | .667 | 20 | – | 13 | .606 |
| Texas A&M–CC | 9 | – | 9 | .500 | 14 | – | 18 | .438 |
| Central Arkansas | 8 | – | 10 | .444 | 14 | – | 19 | .424 |
| Houston Baptist | 8 | – | 10 | .444 | 12 | – | 18 | .400 |
| Stephen F. Austin | 7 | – | 11 | .389 | 14 | – | 16 | .467 |
| Nicholls | 7 | – | 11 | .389 | 14 | – | 17 | .452 |
| Northwestern State | 6 | – | 12 | .333 | 11 | – | 20 | .355 |
| McNeese State | 5 | – | 13 | .278 | 9 | – | 22 | .290 |
| Incarnate Word | 1 | – | 17 | .056 | 6 | – | 25 | .194 |
† 2019 Southland tournament winner

The 2018–19 Central Arkansas Bears basketball team represented the University of Central Arkansas during the 2018–19 NCAA Division I men's basketball season. The Bears were led by fifth-year head coach Russ Pennell and played their home games at the Farris Center in Conway, Arkansas as members of the Southland Conference.

== Previous season ==
The Bears finished the 2017–18 season 18–17, 10–8 in Southland play, to finish in seventh place. They defeated Lamar in the first round of the Southland tournament before losing in the quarterfinals to Stephen F. Austin. They were invited to the College Basketball Invitational where they defeated Seattle before losing in the quarterfinals to Jacksonville State.

== Roster ==
2018–19 Central Arkansas Bears men's basketball team
Players
Coaches

| Pos. | # | Name | Height | Weight | Year | Hometown |
|---|---|---|---|---|---|---|
| PF | 0 | S. K. Shittu | 6 ft 9 in (2.06 m) | 209 lb (95 kg) | So | Rogers, AR |
| F | 3 | Aaron Weidenaar | 6 ft 7 in (2.01 m) | 205 lb (93 kg) | Jr | Bozeman, MT |
| G | 4 | Khaleem Bennett | 6 ft 4 in (1.93 m) | 200 lb (91 kg) | Fr | Hamilton, ON |
| F | 11 | Porter Anderson | 6 ft 7 in (2.01 m) | 230 lb (104 kg) | Fr | Lamar, AR |
| G | 12 | Darraja Parnell | 6 ft 4 in (1.93 m) | 195 lb (88 kg) | Jr | Andover, KS |
| G | 14 | Eddy Kayouloud | 6 ft 7 in (2.01 m) | 220 lb (100 kg) | Fr | Paris, France |
| C | 15 | Hayden Koval | 7 ft 0 in (2.13 m) | 210 lb (95 kg) | So | Prosper, TX |
| G | 20 | Matthew Mondesir | 6 ft 5 in (1.96 m) | 210 lb (95 kg) | So | Los Angeles, CA |
| F/C | 22 | Tanner Schmit | 6 ft 8 in (2.03 m) | 220 lb (100 kg) | Jr | Buffalo, NY |
| F | 24 | Jared Chatham | 6 ft 8 in (2.03 m) | 185 lb (84 kg) | RS So | Los Angeles, CA |
| SG | 25 | Thatch Unruh | 6 ft 5 in (1.96 m) | 190 lb (86 kg) | Sr | Branson, MO |
| G | 33 | Jordan Grant | 6 ft 1 in (1.85 m) | 185 lb (84 kg) | Jr | Harrison, AR |
| G | 34 | Jaxson Baker | 6 ft 7 in (2.01 m) | 200 lb (91 kg) | Fr | Phoenix, AZ |
| C | 35 | Brandon Vanover | 7 ft 0 in (2.13 m) | 250 lb (113 kg) | RS So | Little Rock, AR |
| PG | 55 | DeAndre Jones | 5 ft 11 in (1.8 m) | 160 lb (73 kg) | So | Boise, ID |

Head coach

- Russ Pennell (Central Arkansas)

Assistant coach(es)

- Anthony Boone (Mississippi)
- Matt Scherbenske (Kentucky)
- Tyler Miller (Montana Western)

Legend

- (C) Team captain
- (S) Suspended
- (I) Ineligible
- (W) Walk-on
- Injured
- Current redshirt

Roster
Last update: August 16, 2024

== Schedule and results ==
| Date time, TV | Rank^{#} | Opponent^{#} | Result | Record | Site (attendance) city, state |
Exhibition
| October 29, 2018*; 6:30 p.m. | | Arkansas–Fort Smith | W 98–87 | | Farris Center; Conway, AR |
Non-conference regular season
| November 6, 2018*; 7:00 p.m., SECN | | at Missouri | L 55–68 | 0–1 | Mizzou Arena (9,436); Columbia, MO |
| November 8, 2018*; 7:00 p.m. | | Hendrix College | W 99–73 | 1–1 | Farris Center (887); Conway, AR |
| November 12, 2018*; 7:00 p.m. | | University of the Ozarks | W 93–52 | 2–1 | Farris Center (415); Conway, AR |
| November 15, 2018*; 6:00 p.m., ACC+ | | at Pittsburgh; Barclays Classic | L 71–97 | 2–2 | Petersen Events Center (2,578); Pittsburgh, PA |
| November 18, 2018*; 2:00 p.m. | | at Troy; Barclays Classic | L 77–82 | 2–3 | Trojan Arena (1,312); Troy, AL |
| November 24, 2018*; 3:00 p.m., FSNMW | | at Saint Louis; Barclays Classic | L 61–73 | 2–4 | Chaifetz Arena (6,512); St. Louis, MO |
| November 28, 2018*; 7:00 p.m. | | Little Rock | W 78–65 | 3–4 | Farris Center (2,755); Conway, AR |
| December 5, 2018*; 7:00 p.m., ACC+ | | at Louisville | L 41–86 | 3–5 | KFC Yum! Center (14,920); Louisville, KY |
| December 8, 2018*; 5:30 p.m. | | at Little Rock | W 85–82 | 4–5 | Jack Stephens Center (1,805); Little Rock, AR |
| December 16, 2018*; 3:00 p.m., AT&TSN | | at New Mexico | L 70–82 | 4–6 | Dreamstyle Arena (10,082); Albuquerque, NM |
| December 19, 2018*; 6:00 p.m., BTN | | at No. 22 Indiana | L 53–86 | 4–7 | Simon Skjodt Assembly Hall (13,915); Bloomington, IL |
| December 21, 2018*; 12:00 p.m., FSNOK | | at Oklahoma State | L 73–82 | 4–8 | Gallagher-Iba Arena; Stillwater, OK |
| December 30, 2018*; 4:00 p.m. | | Lyon College | W 62–47 | 5–8 | Farris Center (342); Conway, AR |
Southland regular season
| January 2, 2019; 7:00 p.m. | | at Texas A&M–Corpus Christi | L 75–87 | 5–9 (0–1) | American Bank Center (936); Corpus Christi, TX |
| January 5, 2019; 4:00 p.m. | | at Southeastern Louisiana | W 73–71 | 6–9 (1–1) | University Center (710); Hammond, LA |
| January 9, 2019; 7:00 p.m. | | Sam Houston State | L 68–78 | 6–10 (1–2) | Farris Center (575); Conway, AR |
| January 12, 2019; 4:00 p.m., ELVN / SLC Digital | | Lamar | W 75–68 | 7–10 (2–2) | Farris Center (714); Conway, AR |
| January 16, 2019; 7:00 p.m. | | at Incarnate Word | W 77–60 | 8–10 (3–2) | McDermott Convocation Center; San Antonio, TX |
| January 19, 2019; 4:00 p.m. | | Nicholls State | W 74–68 | 9–10 (4–2) | Farris Center (758); Conway, AR |
| January 23, 2019; 7:00 p.m. | | New Orleans | W 76–71 | 10–10 (5–2) | Farris Center (848); Conway, AR |
| January 26, 2019; 3:30 p.m., ESPN+ | | at Abilene Christian | L 56–79 | 10–11 (5–3) | Moody Coliseum (1,669); Abilene, TX |
| January 30, 2019; 6:30 p.m., ESPN+ | | at Stephen F. Austin | L 99–105 ^{OT} | 10–12 (5–4) | William R. Johnson Coliseum (3,334); Nacogdoches, TX |
| February 2, 2019; 4:00 p.m. | | Northwestern State | L 75–80 | 10–13 (5–5) | Farris Center (912); Conway, AR |
| February 9, 2019; 4:00 p.m. | | Southeastern Louisiana | L 67–75 | 10–14 (5–6) | Farris Center (1,825); Conway, AR |
| February 13, 2019; 7:00 p.m. | | Houston Baptist | L 71–75 | 10–15 (5–7) | Farris Center (515); Conway, AR |
| February 20, 2019; 6:30 p.m. | | at McNeese State | L 75–83 | 10–16 (5–8) | H&HP Complex (2,021); Lake Charles, LA |
| February 23, 2019; 6:30 p.m. | | at Nicholls State | L 57–100 | 10–17 (5–9) | Stopher Gymnasium (478); Thibodaux, LA |
| February 27, 2019; 7:00 p.m., ELVN / SLC Digital | | Stephen F. Austin | W 92–74 | 11–17 (6–9) | Farris Center (445); Conway, AR |
| March 2, 2019; 4:00 p.m. | | Abilene Christian | L 55–67 | 11–18 (6–10) | Farris Center (825); Conway, AR |
| March 6, 2019; 6:30 p.m., ESPN+ | | at Sam Houston State | W 91–87 | 12–18 (7–10) | Bernard Johnson Coliseum (1,167); Huntsville, TX |
| March 9, 2019; 3:00 p.m. | | at Northwestern State | W 70–63 | 13–18 (8–10) | Prather Coliseum (1,410); Natchitoches, LA |
Southland tournament
| March 13, 2019; 7:30 p.m., ESPN+ | (7) | vs. (6) Texas A&M–Corpus Christi; First round | W 73–53 | 14–18 | Leonard E. Merrill Center (1,650); Katy, TX |
| March 14, 2019; 7:30 p.m., ESPN+ | (7) | vs. (3) Southeastern Louisiana; Second round | L 65–79 | 14–19 | Leonard E. Merrill Center (960); Katy, TX |
*Non-conference game. ^{#}Rankings from AP poll. (#) Tournament seedings in parentheses. All times are in Central.

== See also ==
- 2018–19 Central Arkansas Sugar Bears basketball team
