= 2018–19 Nicholls Colonels men's basketball team =

American college basketball season

2018–19 Nicholls Colonels men's basketball

Emerald Coast Classic Pool B champions
- Conference: Southland Conference
- Record: 14–17 (7–11 Southland)
- Head coach: Austin Claunch (1st season)
- Assistant coaches: Matthew Taylor; Trevor Deloach; Nick Bowman
- Home arena: Stopher Gym

2018–19 Southland Conference men's basketball standings
	Conf.				Overall
Team	W		L	PCT	W		L	PCT
Sam Houston State	16	–	2	.889	21	–	12	.636
Abilene Christian †	14	–	4	.778	27	–	7	.794
Southeastern Louisiana	12	–	6	.667	17	–	16	.515
New Orleans	12	–	6	.667	19	–	14	.576
Lamar	12	–	6	.667	20	–	13	.606
Texas A&M–CC	9	–	9	.500	14	–	18	.438
Central Arkansas	8	–	10	.444	14	–	19	.424
Houston Baptist	8	–	10	.444	12	–	18	.400
Stephen F. Austin	7	–	11	.389	14	–	16	.467
Nicholls	7	–	11	.389	14	–	17	.452
Northwestern State	6	–	12	.333	11	–	20	.355
McNeese State	5	–	13	.278	9	–	22	.290
Incarnate Word	1	–	17	.056	6	–	25	.194
† 2019 Southland tournament winner

The 2018–19 Nicholls Colonels men's basketball team represent Nicholls State University during the 2018–19 NCAA Division I men's basketball season. The Colonels, led by first-year head coach Austin Claunch, play their home games at Stopher Gym in Thibodaux, Louisiana as members of the Southland Conference.

== Previous season ==
The Colonels finished the 2017–18 season 21–11, 15–3 in Southland play to earn a share of the regular season championship. As the No. 2 seed in the Southland tournament, they lost in the semifinals to Stephen F. Austin.

On March 15, 2018, head coach Richie Riley left Nicholls to take the head coaching job at South Alabama. Two weeks later, the school promoted assistant coach Austin Claunch to head coach.

== Roster ==
2018–19 Nicholls State Colonels men's basketball team
Players
Coaches

Pos.	#	Name	Height	Weight	Year	Hometown
C	1	Daniel Regis	6 ft 7 in (2.01 m)	235 lb (107 kg)	Sr	St. George's, Grenada
G	2	Jeremiah Buford	6 ft 5 in (1.96 m)	170 lb (77 kg)	So	Atlanta, Georgia
G	3	Kevin Johnson	5 ft 10 in (1.78 m)	160 lb (73 kg)	So	Thibodaux, Louisiana
G	4	Tom Clement	6 ft 2 in (1.88 m)	175 lb (79 kg)	Jr	Thibodaux, Louisiana
F	5	Warith Alatishe	6 ft 7 in (2.01 m)	190 lb (86 kg)	Fr	Houston, Texas
G	11	Gavin Peppers	6 ft 3 in (1.91 m)	190 lb (86 kg)	GS	Washington, D.C.
G	15	Jeremiah Jefferson	6 ft 2 in (1.88 m)	183 lb (83 kg)	GS	Dallas, Texas
G/F	22	Brandon Moore Jr.	6 ft 5 in (1.96 m)	215 lb (98 kg)	Jr	Dallas, Texas
F	23	Elvis Harvey Jr.	6 ft 9 in (2.06 m)	210 lb (95 kg)	Jr	South Bay, Florida
G	24	Danny Garrick	6 ft 6 in (1.98 m)	195 lb (88 kg)	Jr	Parker, Colorado
F/C	35	Ryghe Lyons	6 ft 10 in (2.08 m)	230 lb (104 kg)	So	Slidell, Louisiana
G		Nico Clareth	6 ft 5 in (1.96 m)	205 lb (93 kg)	Jr	Baltimore, Maryland
G		D'Angelo Hunter	6 ft 7 in (2.01 m)	200 lb (91 kg)	RS Jr	Louisville, Kentucky
G		Dexter McClanahan	6 ft 4 in (1.93 m)	180 lb (82 kg)	RS Sr	Ellenwood, Georgia

Head coach

- Austin Claunch (Emory)

Assistant coach(es)

- Matthew Taylor (Union College)
- Trevor Deloach (UNCW)
- Nick Bowman (Eastern Kentucky)

Legend

- (C) Team captain
- (S) Suspended
- (I) Ineligible
- (W) Walk-on
- Injured
- Current redshirt

Roster
Last update: September 13, 2018

== Schedule and results ==
Date time, TV	Rank^{#}	Opponent^{#}	Result	Record	Site (attendance) city, state
Non-conference regular season
Nov 6, 2018*; 7:00 pm		Mississippi College	W 86–58	1–0	Stopher Gymnasium (233); Thibodaux, LA
Nov 8, 2018*; 6:00 pm, ACC+		at Louisville	L 72–85	1–1	KFC Yum! Center (15,355); Louisville, KY
Nov 11, 2018*; 6:00 pm, PAC12		at Washington State	L 72–89	1–2	Beasley Coliseum (2,090); Pullman, WS
Nov 13, 2018*; 8:00 pm, PlutoTV		at Idaho	W 83–80	2–2	Memorial Gymnasium (413); Moscow, ID
Nov 16, 2018*; 11:00 am, FSSW		at Baylor; Emerald Coast Classic	L 54–81	2–3	Ferrell Center (8,721); Waco, TX
Nov 20, 2018*; 6:00 pm, SECN		at Ole Miss; Emerald Coast Classic	L 55–75	2–4	The Pavilion at Ole Miss (5,903); Oxford, MS
Nov 23, 2018*; 11:00 am		vs. North Carolina Central; Emerald Coast Classic	W 77-63	3-4	The Arena at Northwest Florida State College (135); Niceville, FL
Nov 24, 2018*; 12:30 pm		vs. Western Michigan; Emerald Coast Classic (Visitor's Championship)	W 62-61 ^{OT}	4-4	The Arena at Northwest Florida State College (125); Niceville, FL
Nov 28, 2018*; 7:00 pm		Spring Hill College	W 85-65	5-4	Stopher Gymnasium (461); Thibodaux, LA
Dec 15, 2018*; 12:00 pm, Patriot League Network		at Boston University	L 63-75	5-5	Case Gym (584); Boston, MA
Dec 18, 2018*; 7:00 pm		at Louisiana–Monroe	L 68–95	5–6	Fant–Ewing Coliseum (1,812); Monroe, LA
Dec 22, 2018*; 2:00 pm		Mobile	W 84–67	6–6	Stopher Gymnasium (222); Thibodaux, LA
Dec 22, 2018*; 7:00 pm		Campbellsville Harrodsburg	W 88–63	7–6	Stopher Gymnasium (199); Thibodaux, LA
Southland regular season
Jan 2, 2019; 6:30 pm		at Northwestern State	W 78–72	8–6 (1–0)	Prather Coliseum (802); Natchitoches, LA
Jan 5, 2019; 7:00 pm		at Incarnate Word	L 58–65	8–7 (1–1)	McDermott Convocation Center; San Antonio, TX
Jan 9, 2019; 7:00 pm, ELVN / SLC Digital		Stephen F. Austin	W 78–73	9–7 (2–1)	Stopher Gym (214); Thibodaux, LA
Jan 12, 2019; 3:30 pm		Houston Baptist	W 77–76	10–7 (3–1)	Stopher Gym (367); Thibodaux, LA
Jan 16, 2019; 6:30 pm		at McNeese State	L 75-86	10-8 (3-2)	H&HP Complex (2,278); Lake Charles, LA
Jan 19, 2019; 4:00 pm		at Central Arkansas	L 68-74	10-9 (3-3)	Farris Center (758); Conway, AR
Jan 23, 2019; 7:00 pm		at Texas A&M–Corpus Christi	L 73-75	10-10 (3-4)	American Bank Center (975); Corpus Christi, TX
Jan 30, 2019; 7:00 pm		Lamar	L 69–90	10–11 (3–5)	Stopher Gym (315); Thibodaux, LA
Feb 2, 2019; 4:00 pm, ESPN3		at Southeastern Louisiana	L 70–91	10–12 (3–6)	University Center (879); Hammond, LA
Feb 9, 2019; 4:15 pm		at New Orleans	W 64–63	11–12 (4–6)	Lakefront Arena (1,334); New Orleans, LA
Feb 13, 2019		Abilene Christian	L 48–64	11–13 (4–7)	Stopher Gym (313); Thibodaux, LA
Feb 16, 2019; 7:00 pm, ELVN / SLC Digital		at Houston Baptist	L 82–88	11–14 (4–8)	Sharp Gymnasium (611); Houston, TX
Feb 20, 2019; 6:30 pm, ESPN+		at Sam Houston State	L 74–84 ^{OT}	11–15 (4–9)	Bernard G. Johnson Coliseum (1,393); Huntsville, TX
Feb 23, 2019; 6:30 pm		Central Arkansas	W 100–57	12–15 (5–9)	Stopher Gym (478); Thibodaux, LA
Feb 27, 2019		McNeese State	L 75–84	12–16 (5–10)	Stopher Gym (305); Thibodaux, LA
Mar 2, 2019; 3:30 pm		New Orleans	L 70–80	12–17 (5–11)	Stopher Gym (503); Thibodaux, LA
Mar 6, 2019		Northwestern State	W 83–60	13–17 (6–11)	Stopher Gym (501); Thibodaux, LA
Mar 9, 2019; 6:30 pm		Southeastern Louisiana	W 69–63	14–17 (7–11)	Stopher Gym (540); Thibodaux, LA
*Non-conference game. ^{#}Rankings from AP Poll. (#) Tournament seedings in parentheses. All times are in Central Time.

== See also ==
- 2018–19 Nicholls State Colonels women's basketball team
