= 2018–19 Stephen F. Austin Lumberjacks basketball team =

American college basketball season

2018–19 Stephen F. Austin Lumberjacks basketball
- Conference: Southland Conference
- Record: 0–16, 14 wins vacated (0–11 Southland, 7 wins vacated)
- Head coach: Kyle Keller (3rd season)
- Assistant coaches: Jeremy Cox; Desmond Haymon; Wade Mason
- Home arena: William R. Johnson Coliseum (Capacity: 7,203)

2018–19 Southland Conference men's basketball standings
	Conf.				Overall
Team	W		L	PCT	W		L	PCT
Sam Houston State	16	–	2	.889	21	–	12	.636
Abilene Christian †	14	–	4	.778	27	–	7	.794
Southeastern Louisiana	12	–	6	.667	17	–	16	.515
New Orleans	12	–	6	.667	19	–	14	.576
Lamar	12	–	6	.667	20	–	13	.606
Texas A&M–CC	9	–	9	.500	14	–	18	.438
Central Arkansas	8	–	10	.444	14	–	19	.424
Houston Baptist	8	–	10	.444	12	–	18	.400
Stephen F. Austin	7	–	11	.389	14	–	16	.467
Nicholls	7	–	11	.389	14	–	17	.452
Northwestern State	6	–	12	.333	11	–	20	.355
McNeese State	5	–	13	.278	9	–	22	.290
Incarnate Word	1	–	17	.056	6	–	25	.194
† 2019 Southland tournament winner

The 2018–19 Stephen F. Austin Lumberjacks basketball team represented Stephen F. Austin State University during the 2018–19 NCAA Division I men's basketball season. The Lumberjacks were led by third-year head coach Kyle Keller and played their home games at the William R. Johnson Coliseum in Nacogdoches, Texas as members of the Southland Conference. They finished the season 14–16 overall, 7–11 in Southland play to finish in a tie for ninth place. Since only the top eight teams are eligible to play in the Southland tournament, the Lumberjacks failed to qualify this season.

On May 20, 2020, following the discovery of an administrative error in certifying eligibility for student-athletes, Stephen F. Austin reached an agreement with the NCAA to vacate hundreds of wins across multiple sports from 2013 to 2019, including all 117 men's basketball wins from the 2014–15 to 2018–19 seasons.

== Previous season ==
The 2017–18 Stephen F. Austin Lumberjacks basketball team finished the season 28–7, 14–4 in Southland play to finish in third place. They defeated Central Arkansas, Nicholls State, and Southeastern Louisiana to become champions of the Southland tournament. They received the Southland's automatic bid to the NCAA tournament where they lost in the first round to Texas Tech.

== Roster ==
2018–19 Stephen F. Austin Lumberjacks men's basketball team
Players
Coaches

Pos.	#	Name	Height	Weight	Year	Hometown
G	0	Aaron Augustin	5 ft 11 in (1.8 m)	185 lb (84 kg)	Jr	Suwanee, Georgia
G/F	1	Kevon Harris	6 ft 6 in (1.98 m)	225 lb (102 kg)	Jr	Ellenwood, Georgia
G	1	Jock Hughes	6 ft 3 in (1.91 m)	172 lb (78 kg)	Fr	Houston, Texas
F	3	Mitchell Seraille	6 ft 7 in (2.01 m)	209 lb (95 kg)	Fr	Houston, Texas
F	4	Davonte Fitzgerald	6 ft 7 in (2.01 m)	205 lb (93 kg)	GS	Atlanta, Georgia
G	5	Shannon Bogues	6 ft 2 in (1.88 m)	185 lb (84 kg)	Sr	Killeen, Texas
G	10	John Comeaux	5 ft 11 in (1.8 m)	185 lb (84 kg)	Jr	Beaumont, Texas
G	11	Oddyste Walker	6 ft 2 in (1.88 m)	178 lb (81 kg)	Fr	Baton Rouge, Louisiana
G	15	Rance Cole	5 ft 11 in (1.8 m)	165 lb (75 kg)	Jr	Coldspring, Texas
F	22	T. J. Holyfield	6 ft 8 in (2.03 m)	220 lb (100 kg)	Sr	Albuquerque, New Mexico
F	23	Nathan Bain	6 ft 6 in (1.98 m)	200 lb (91 kg)	Jr	Freeport, Bahamas
F	24	Samuli Nieminen	6 ft 7 in (2.01 m)	215 lb (98 kg)	Jr	Helsinki, Finland
C	32	Jovan Grujic	7 ft 0 in (2.13 m)	230 lb (104 kg)	Sr	Pančevo, Serbia
F		Karl Nikolas	6 ft 8 in (2.03 m)	211 lb (96 kg)	So	Pearland, Texas

Head coach

- Kyle Keller (Louisiana Tech)

Assistant coach(es)

- Jeremy Cox (Colorado Mesa)
- Desmond Haymon (Stephen F. Austin)
- Wade Mason (Tulane)

Legend

- (C) Team captain
- (S) Suspended
- (I) Ineligible
- (W) Walk-on
- Injured
- Current redshirt

Roster
Last update: September 13, 2018

== Schedule and results ==
Date time, TV	Opponent	Result	Record	Site (attendance) city, state
Non-conference regular season
Nov 6, 2018*; 6:30 pm, ESPN3	Texas Wesleyan	W 83–71	1–0	William R. Johnson Coliseum (3,120); Nacogdoches, TX
Nov 8, 2018*; 6:30 pm, ESPN3	Southwestern Assemblies of God	W 68–67	2–0	William R. Johnson Coliseum (2,755); Nacogdoches, TX
Nov 13, 2018*; 6:00 pm, ESPNU	at Miami (FL)	L 58–96	2–1	Watsco Center (6,066); Coral Gables, FL
Nov 20, 2018*; 7:30 pm, ESPN3	Marist; Basketball Hall of Fame Belfast Classic campus game	W 64–60	3–1	William R. Johnson Coliseum (2,804); Nacogdoches, TX
Nov 25, 2018*; 4:30 pm, ESPN3	St. Edward's; Basketball Hall of Fame Belfast Classic campus game	W 73–60	4–1	William R. Johnson Coliseum (2,247); Nacogdoches, TX
Nov 30, 2018*; 7:00 am	vs. San Francisco; Basketball Hall of Fame Belfast Classic semifinals	L 58–76	4–2	SSE Arena; Belfast, Northern Ireland
Dec 1, 2018*; 7:00 am, CBSSN	vs. Milwaukee; Basketball Hall of Fame Belfast Classic consolation game	W 66–51	5–2	SSE Arena; Belfast, Northern Ireland
Dec 7, 2018*; 6:30 pm, ESPN3	Louisiana Tech	L 93–96 ^{OT}	5–3	William R. Johnson Coliseum (3,823); Nacogdoches, TX
Dec 15, 2018*; 2:00 pm	at Louisiana–Monroe	L 58-74	5-4	Fant–Ewing Coliseum (2,057); Monroe, LA
Dec 18, 2018*; 7:30 pm, FSSW+	at Baylor	W 59–58	6–4	Ferrell Center (4,336); Waco, TX
Dec 21, 2018*; 6:30 pm, ESPN3	Arlington Baptist	W 97–47	7–4	William R. Johnson Coliseum (2,321); Nacogdoches, TX
Dec 30, 2018*; 5:00 pm, ESPNU	Alabama	L 69–79	7–5	William R. Johnson Coliseum (7,203); Nacogdoches, TX
Southland regular season
Jan 2, 2019; 6:30 pm, ESPN3	Southeastern Louisiana	W 65–60	8–5 (1–0)	William R. Johnson Coliseum (3,124); Nacogdoches, TX
Jan 9, 2019; 7:00 pm	at Nicholls State	L 73–78	8–6 (1–1)	Stopher Gym (214); Thibodaux, LA
Jan 12, 2019; 4:30 pm, ESPN3	Northwestern State	L 59–61	8–7 (1–2)	William R. Johnson Coliseum (2,758); Nacogdoches, TX
Jan 16, 2019; 7:00 pm	at New Orleans	L 61-68	8-8 (1-3)	Lakefront Arena (734); New Orleans, LA
Jan 19, 2019; 3:00 pm	at Incarnate Word	W 74-71	9-8 (2-3)	McDermott Convocation Center (1,139); San Antonio, TX
Jan 23, 2019; 6:30 pm, ESPN3	Abilene Christian	W 61-60	10-8 (3-3)	William R. Johnson Coliseum (3,027); Nacogdoches, TX
Jan 30, 2019; 6:30 pm, ESPN3	Central Arkansas	W 105–99 ^{OT}	11–8 (4–3)	William R. Johnson Coliseum (3,344); Nacogdoches, TX
Feb 2, 2019; 7:00 pm	at Sam Houston State	L 72–94	11–9 (4–4)	Bernard G. Johnson Coliseum (3,134); Huntsville, TX
Feb 6, 2019; 7:00 pm	at Houston Baptist	W 79–77	12–9 (5–4)	Sharp Gymnasium (908); Houston, TX
Feb 9, 2019; 4:30 pm, ESPN3	Lamar	L 67–82	12–10 (5–5)	William R. Johnson Coliseum (5,752); Nacogdoches, Texas
Feb 13, 2019; 6:30 pm, ESPN3	McNeese State	W 67–57	13–10 (6–5)	William R. Johnson Coliseum (3,158); Nacogdoches, TX
Feb 16, 2019; 3:30 pm	at Northwestern State	L 72–87	13–11 (6–6)	Prather Coliseum (2,020); Natchitoches, LA
Feb 20, 2019; 6:30 pm, ESPN3	Texas A&M–Corpus Christi	L 55–65	13–12 (6–7)	William R. Johnson Coliseum (2,612); Nacogdoches, TX
Feb 23, 2019; 4:30 pm, ESPN3	Incarnate Word	W 81–54	14–12 (7–7)	William R. Johnson Coliseum (3,803); Nacogdoches, TX
Feb 27, 2019; 7:00 pm, ESPN3	Central Arkansas	L 74–92	14–13 (7–8)	William R. Johnson Coliseum (445); Nacogdoches, TX
Mar 2, 2019; 4:30 pm, ESPN+	at Lamar	L 79–81	14–14 (7–9)	Montagne Center (3,551); Beaumont, TX
Mar 6, 2019; 7:00 pm	at Abilene Christian	L 58–72	14–15 (7–10)	Moody Coliseum (1,235); Abilene, TX
Mar 9, 2019; 4:30 pm, ESPN3	Sam Houston State	L 57–68	14–16 (7–11)	William R. Johnson Coliseum (5,464); Nacogdoches, TX
*Non-conference game. ^{#}Rankings from AP Poll. (#) Tournament seedings in parentheses. All times are in Central Time.

== See also ==
- 2018–19 Stephen F. Austin Ladyjacks basketball team
- List of vacated and forfeited games in college basketball
