= 2018–19 Abilene Christian Wildcats men's basketball team =

American college basketball season

2018–19 Abilene Christian Wildcats men's basketball

Southland tournament champions Tiger's Thanksgiving Classic champions

NCAA tournament, first round
- Conference: Southland Conference
- Record: 27–7 (14–4 Southland)
- Head coach: Joe Golding (8th season)
- Assistant coaches: Brette Tanner; Ted Crass; Antonio Bostic
- Home arena: Moody Coliseum

2018–19 Southland Conference men's basketball standings
	Conf.				Overall
Team	W		L	PCT	W		L	PCT
Sam Houston State	16	–	2	.889	21	–	12	.636
Abilene Christian †	14	–	4	.778	27	–	7	.794
Southeastern Louisiana	12	–	6	.667	17	–	16	.515
New Orleans	12	–	6	.667	19	–	14	.576
Lamar	12	–	6	.667	20	–	13	.606
Texas A&M–CC	9	–	9	.500	14	–	18	.438
Central Arkansas	8	–	10	.444	14	–	19	.424
Houston Baptist	8	–	10	.444	12	–	18	.400
Stephen F. Austin	7	–	11	.389	14	–	16	.467
Nicholls	7	–	11	.389	14	–	17	.452
Northwestern State	6	–	12	.333	11	–	20	.355
McNeese State	5	–	13	.278	9	–	22	.290
Incarnate Word	1	–	17	.056	6	–	25	.194
† 2019 Southland tournament winner

The 2018–19 Abilene Christian Wildcats men's basketball team represented Abilene Christian University during the 2018–19 NCAA Division I men's basketball season. The Wildcats were led by eighth-year head coach Joe Golding and played their home games at the Moody Coliseum in Abilene, Texas as members of the Southland Conference. They finished the season 27–7, 14–4 in Southland play, to finish in second place. In the Southland tournament, they defeated Southeastern Louisiana in the semifinals before beating New Orleans in the final to win the Southland tournament. As a result, they received an automatic bid to the NCAA tournament, where they lost in the first round to Kentucky.

== Previous season ==
The Wildcats finished the 2017–18 season 16–16, 8–10 in Southland play, to finish in a three-way tie for eighth place. They failed to qualify for the Southland tournament. They received an invitation to the CollegeInsider.com Tournament where they lost in the first round to Drake.

== Roster ==
2018–19 Abilene Christian Wildcats men's basketball team
Players
Coaches

Pos.	#	Name	Height	Weight	Year	Hometown
G	0	Jaylen Franklin	6 ft 2 in (1.88 m)	205 lb (93 kg)	Sr	Little Rock, AR
F	1	Jaren Lewis	6 ft 6 in (1.98 m)	215 lb (98 kg)	Sr	Orlando, FL
G	4	Damien Daniels	5 ft 7 in (1.7 m)	140 lb (64 kg)	Fr	Kansas City, MO
G	5	Payten Ricks	6 ft 2 in (1.88 m)	190 lb (86 kg)	Jr	Wichita, KS
G	11	Tobias Cameron	6 ft 5 in (1.96 m)	210 lb (95 kg)	RS Fr	Gold Coast, Australia
G	14	Trey Lenox	6 ft 3 in (1.91 m)	220 lb (100 kg)	Jr	Hot Springs, AR
F	15	Hayden Farquhar	6 ft 7 in (2.01 m)	215 lb (98 kg)	Sr	Throckmorton, TX
G	22	Chase Cobb	6 ft 1 in (1.85 m)	190 lb (86 kg)	Jr	Richmond, TX
F	23	Hayden Howell (redshirt)	6 ft 7 in (2.01 m)	225 lb (102 kg)	Sr	Midwest City, OK
F	32	Joe Pleasant	6 ft 8 in (2.03 m)	220 lb (100 kg)	Fr	Overland Park, KS
G	33	Paul Hiepler	6 ft 4 in (1.93 m)	170 lb (77 kg)	So	Camarillo, CA
C	34	Kolton Kohl	7 ft 0 in (2.13 m)	240 lb (109 kg)	RS So	San Angelo, TX
F	42	Clay Gayman	6 ft 6 in (1.98 m)	220 lb (100 kg)	Fr	Nevada, MO

Head coach

- Joe Golding (Abilene Christian)

Assistant coach(es)

- Brette Tanner (Emporia State)
- Ted Crass (Little Rock)
- Antonio Bostic (Stephen F. Austin)

Legend

- (C) Team captain
- (S) Suspended
- (I) Ineligible
- (W) Walk-on
- Injured
- Current redshirt

Roster
Last update: January 26, 2019

== Schedule and results ==
Date time, TV	Rank^{#}	Opponent^{#}	Result	Record	Site (attendance) city, state
Non-conference regular season
November 6, 2018*; 7:00 p.m.		Arlington Baptist	W 107–54	1–0	Moody Coliseum (1,500); Abilene, TX
November 9, 2018*; 8:00 p.m.		Arkansas State	W 94–73	2–0	Moody Coliseum (1,209); Abilene, TX
November 15, 2018*; 8:00 p.m.		at Denver	W 67–61	3–0	Magness Arena (804); Denver, CO
November 22, 2018*; 5:00 p.m.		vs. Elon; Tiger's Thanksgiving Classic	W 72–56	4–0	Alex G. Spanos Center; Stockton, CA
November 23, 2018*; 7:30 p.m.		at Pacific; Tiger's Thanksgiving Classic	W 73–71	5–0	Alex G. Spanos Center (602); Stockton, CA
November 24, 2018*; 10:00 p.m.		vs. UC Riverside; Tiger's Thanksgiving Classic	W 60–48	6–0	Alex G. Spanos Center; Stockton, CA
November 27, 2018*; 7:00 p.m.		Howard Payne	W 90–53	7–0	Moody Coliseum (1,027); Abilene, TX
December 1, 2018*; 5:00 p.m.		at Pepperdine	L 62–77	7–1	Firestone Fieldhouse (1,044); Malibu, CA
December 4, 2018*; 7:00 p.m., ESPN+		Campbell	W 83–68	8–1	Moody Coliseum (1,027); Abilene, TX
December 8, 2018*; 10:30 a.m.		Schreiner	W 93–53	9–1	Moody Coliseum (1,018); Abilene, TX
December 15, 2018*; 6:00 p.m.		at No. 11 Texas Tech; Throwback Game	L 48–82	9–2	Lubbock Municipal Coliseum (7,169); Lubbock, TX
December 21, 2018*; 6:30 p.m., ESPN+		at Southeast Missouri State	W 70–68	10–2	Show Me Center (672); Cape Girardeau, MO
December 29, 2018*; 2:00 p.m.		McMurry	W 88–40	11–2	Moody Coliseum (685); Abilene, TX
Southland regular season
January 2, 2019; 7:00 p.m.		New Orleans	W 68–58	12–2 (1–0)	Moody Coliseum (525); Abilene, TX
January 5, 2019; 6:30 p.m.		at Sam Houston State	L 68–71	12–3 (1–1)	Bernard G. Johnson Coliseum (771); Huntsville, TX
January 9, 2019; 6:30 p.m.		at McNeese State	W 73–72	13–3 (2–1)	H&HP Complex (1,782); Lake Charles, LA
January 12, 2019; 4:00 p.m.		at Southeastern Louisiana	W 75–72	14–3 (3–1)	University Center (563); Hammond, LA
January 16, 2019; 7:00 p.m.		Houston Baptist	W 75–68	15–3 (4–1)	Moody Coliseum (1,169); Abilene, TX
January 19, 2019; 6:00 p.m.		Northwestern State	W 78–69	16–3 (5–1)	Moody Coliseum (1,199); Abilene, TX
January 23, 2019; 6:30 p.m., ESPN+		at Stephen F. Austin	L 60–61	16–4 (5–2)	William R. Johnson Coliseum (3,027); Nacogdoches, TX
January 26, 2019; 3:30 p.m., ESPN+		Central Arkansas	W 79–56	17–4 (6–2)	Moody Coliseum (1,669); Abilene, TX
January 30, 2019; 7:00 p.m., ESPN3		Texas A&M–Corpus Christi	W 78–71	18–4 (7–2)	Moody Coliseum (1,301); Abilene, TX
February 6, 2019; 7:00 p.m., ESPN+		at Lamar	W 75–64	19–4 (8–2)	Montagne Center (2,438); Beaumont, TX
February 9, 2019; 6:00 p.m.		Sam Houston State	L 85–90 ^{2OT}	19–5 (8–3)	Moody Coliseum (2,397); Abilene, TX
February 13, 2019		at Nicholls State	W 64–48	20–5 (9–3)	Stopher Gym (313); Thibodaux, LA
February 16, 2019; 7:00 p.m.		at Incarnate Word	W 68–48	21–5 (10–3)	McDermott Convocation Center (739); San Antonio, TX
February 23, 2019; 3:30 p.m.		Southeastern Louisiana	L 66–75	21–6 (10–4)	Moody Coliseum (1,399); Abilene, TX
February 27, 2019; 7:00 p.m.		at Texas A&M–Corpus Christi	W 73–64	22–6 (11–4)	American Bank Center (1,191); Corpus Christi, TX
March 2, 2019; 4:00 p.m.		at Central Arkansas	W 67–55	23–6 (12–4)	Farris Center (825); Conway, AR
March 6, 2019; 7:00 p.m., ESPN+		Stephen F. Austin	W 72–58	24–6 (13–4)	Moody Coliseum (1,235); Abilene, TX
March 9, 2019; 4:00 p.m.		Incarnate Word	W 81–52	25–6 (14–4)	Moody Coliseum (1,501); Abilene, TX
Southland tournament
March 15, 2019; 7:30 p.m., ESPN+	(2)	vs. (3) Southeastern Louisiana; Semifinals	W 69–66	26–6	Merrell Center (2,100); Katy, TX
March 16, 2019; 8:30 p.m., ESPN2	(2)	vs. (4) New Orleans; Championship	W 77–60	27–6	Merrell Center (1,751); Katy, TX
NCAA tournament
March 21, 2019*; 6:10 p.m., CBS	(15 MW)	vs. (2 MW) No. 7 Kentucky; First round	L 44–79	27–7	VyStar Veterans Memorial Arena (13,495); Jacksonville, FL
*Non-conference game. ^{#}Rankings from AP poll. (#) Tournament seedings in parentheses. All times are in Central.

== See also ==
- 2018–19 Abilene Christian Wildcats women's basketball team
