= 2018–19 Texas A&M–Corpus Christi Islanders men's basketball team =

American college basketball season

2018–19 Texas A&M–Corpus Christi Islanders men's basketball
- Conference: Southland Conference
- Record: 14–18 (9–9 Southland)
- Head coach: Willis Wilson (8th season)
- Assistant coaches: Marty Gross; Mark Dannhoff; Terry Johnson
- Home arena: American Bank Center; Dugan Wellness Center

2018–19 Southland Conference men's basketball standings
	Conf.				Overall
Team	W		L	PCT	W		L	PCT
Sam Houston State	16	–	2	.889	21	–	12	.636
Abilene Christian †	14	–	4	.778	27	–	7	.794
Southeastern Louisiana	12	–	6	.667	17	–	16	.515
New Orleans	12	–	6	.667	19	–	14	.576
Lamar	12	–	6	.667	20	–	13	.606
Texas A&M–CC	9	–	9	.500	14	–	18	.438
Central Arkansas	8	–	10	.444	14	–	19	.424
Houston Baptist	8	–	10	.444	12	–	18	.400
Stephen F. Austin	7	–	11	.389	14	–	16	.467
Nicholls	7	–	11	.389	14	–	17	.452
Northwestern State	6	–	12	.333	11	–	20	.355
McNeese State	5	–	13	.278	9	–	22	.290
Incarnate Word	1	–	17	.056	6	–	25	.194
† 2019 Southland tournament winner

The 2018–19 Texas A&M–Corpus Christi Islanders men's basketball team represented Texas A&M University–Corpus Christi in the 2018–19 NCAA Division I men's basketball season. The Islanders were led by head coach Willis Wilson, in his eighth season at Texas A&M–Corpus Christi, as members of the Southland Conference. They played all their home games at the American Bank Center, except for two games at the Dugan Wellness Center. They finished the season 14–18 overall, 9–9 in Southland play to finish in sixth place. As the No. 6 seed in the Southland tournament, they were defeated in the first round by Central Arkansas.

== Previous season ==
The Islanders finished the 2017–18 season 11–18, 8–10 in Southland play to finish in a three-way tie for eighth place. Due to tiebreakers, they received the No. 8 seed in the Southland tournament where they lost to New Orleans in the first round.

== Roster ==
2018–19 Texas A&M–Corpus Christi Islanders men's basketball team
Players
Coaches

Pos.	#	Name	Height	Weight	Year	Hometown
G	0	Kyle Brown	5 ft 10 in (1.78 m)	150 lb (68 kg)	RS Jr	Missouri City, Texas
G	2	Myles Smith	6 ft 0 in (1.83 m)	195 lb (88 kg)	So	Klein, Texas
G	4	Jashawn Talton	6 ft 5 in (1.96 m)	215 lb (98 kg)	Jr	Oklahoma City, Oklahoma
G	5	Javae Lampkins	6 ft 1 in (1.85 m)	180 lb (82 kg)	So	Washington, D.C.
F	10	Perry Francois	6 ft 8 in (2.03 m)	225 lb (102 kg)	Jr	North Miami, Florida
G	11	Kareem South	6 ft 2 in (1.88 m)	185 lb (84 kg)	RS Jr	Toronto, Ontario, Canada
G	12	Peyton Smith	6 ft 0 in (1.83 m)	190 lb (86 kg)	So	Corpus Christi, Texas
F	14	Elijah Schmidt	6 ft 8 in (2.03 m)	195 lb (88 kg)	Jr	Spring, Texas
F	15	Irshaad Hunte	6 ft 8 in (2.03 m)	215 lb (98 kg)	Jr	Toronto, Canada
G	21	Tre Gray	6 ft 2 in (1.88 m)	170 lb (77 kg)	So	Oakland, California
G	22	Emmanuel Toney	6 ft 2 in (1.88 m)	185 lb (84 kg)	RS Sr	Bowie, Maryland
F	23	Jalen Clark	6 ft 6 in (1.98 m)	200 lb (91 kg)	Fr	Houston, Texas
F	35	Tony Lewis	6 ft 10 in (2.08 m)	260 lb (118 kg)	Jr	San Antonio, Texas
G	45	Jake Babic	6 ft 5 in (1.96 m)	180 lb (82 kg)	Sr	Oakville, Canada

Head coach

- Willis Wilson (Rice)

Assistant coach(es)

- Marty Gross (Jacksonville)
- Mark Dannhoff (UW–La Crosse)
- Terry Johnson (Stanislaus State)

Legend

- (C) Team captain
- (S) Suspended
- (I) Ineligible
- (W) Walk-on
- Injured
- Current redshirt

Roster
Last update: August 24, 2018

== Schedule and results ==
Date time, TV	Rank^{#}	Opponent^{#}	Result	Record	Site (attendance) city, state
Non-conference regular season
Nov. 7, 2018*; 7:00 pm, KDF		Howard Payne	W 81–34	1–0	American Bank Center (1,097); Corpus Christi, TX
Nov. 9, 2018*; 7:00 pm		Our Lady of the Lake	W 113–83	2–0	Dugan Wellness Center (1,003); Corpus Christi, TX
Nov. 12, 2018*; 7:00 pm, KDF		Texas–Rio Grande Valley; South Texas Showdown	L 69–76	2–1	American Bank Center (1,160); Corpus Christi, TX
Nov. 16, 2018*; 7:00 pm, ESPN+		at UT Arlington; Hardwood Showcase	W 73–67	3–1	College Park Center (1,569); Arlington, TX
Nov. 17, 2018*; 2:00 pm		vs. UC Davis; Hardwood Showcase	L 54–57 ^{OT}	3–2	College Park Center (150); Arlington, TX
Nov. 21, 2018*; 7:00 p.m., KDF		St. Mary's	W 61-58	4-2	American Bank Center (817); Corpus Christi, TX
Nov. 26, 2018*; 7:00 p.m.		at Texas–Rio Grande Valley; South Texas Showdown	L 59-68	4-3	UTRGV Fieldhouse (695); Edinburg, TX
Dec 2, 2018*; 11:00 am, SECN		at No. 6 Tennessee	L 51–79	4–4	Thompson–Boling Arena (14,730); Knoxville, TN
Dec 5, 2018*; 7:00 p.m., Eleven Sports		Texas State	L 55-61	4-5	American Bank Center (1,225); Corpus Christi, TX
Dec 18, 2018*; 7:30 p.m., KDF		Huston–Tillotson	W 81–63	5–5	American Bank Center (1,191); Corpus Christi, TX
Dec 20, 2018*; 7:30 p.m.		UTSA	L 50–64	5–6	American Bank Center (1,004); Corpus Christi, TX
Dec 22, 2018*; 4:00 pm		at Louisiana Tech	L 68–73	5–7	Thomas Assembly Center (1,307); Ruston, LA
Dec 292, 2018*; 1:00 pm		at Oklahoma State	L 59–69	5–8	Gallagher-Iba Arena (6,745); Stillwater, OK
Southland regular season
January 2, 2019; 7:00 pm		Central Arkansas	W 87–75	6–8 (1–0)	American Bank Center (936); Corpus Christi, TX
Jan 5, 2019; 4:30 pm, ESPN3		at Lamar	L 55–61	6–9 (1–1)	Montagne Center; Beaumont, TX
Jan 9, 2019; 6:30 pm		at Northwestern State	W 62–61	7–9 (2–1)	Prather Coliseum (1,214); Natchitoches, LA
Jan 16, 2019; 6:30 pm		at Sam Houston State	L 50–72	7–10 (2–2)	Bernard G. Johnson Coliseum (855); Huntsville, TX
Jan 19, 2019; 5:00 pm		New Orleans	W 76-61	8-10 (3-2)	American Bank Center (1,215); Corpus Christi, TX
Jan 23, 2019; 7:00 pm		Nicholls State	W 75-73	9-10 (4-2)	American Bank Center (975); Corpus Christi, TX
Jan 30, 2019; 7:00 pm		at Abilene Christian	L 71–78	9–11 (4–3)	Moody Coliseum (1,301); Abilene, TX
Feb 2, 2019; 7:00 pm		at Houston Baptist	L 72–73	9–12 (4–4)	Sharp Gymnasium (1,000); Houston, TX
Feb 6, 2019; 7:00 pm		Southeastern Louisiana	L 58–64	9–13 (4–5)	Dugan Wellness Center (1,400); Corpus Christi, TX
Feb 9, 2019; 7:00 pm		Incarnate Word; Homecoming	W 70–61	10–13 (5–5)	American Bank Center (2,318); Corpus Christi, TX
Feb 13, 2019; 7:00 pm		Sam Houston State	L 69–70	10–14 (5–6)	American Bank Center (1,118); Corpus Christi, TX
Feb 16, 2019; 4:15 pm		at New Orleans	L 58–68	10–15 (5–7)	Lakefront Arena (793); New Orleans, LA
Feb 20, 2019; 6:30 pm, ESPN3		at Stephen F. Austin	W 65–55	11–15 (6–7)	William R. Johnson Coliseum (2,614); Nacogdoches, TX
Feb 23, 2019; 3:30 pm		Lamar	L 58–63	11–16 (6–8)	American Bank Center (1,250); Corpus Christi, TX
Feb 27, 2019; 7:00 pm		Abilene Christian	L 64–73	11–17 (6–9)	American Bank Center (1,191); Corpus Christi, TX
Mar 2, 2019; 7:00 pm		at Incarnate Word	W 74–72 ^{OT}	12–17 (7–9)	McDermott Convocation Center (860); San Antonio, TX
Mar 6, 2019; 6:30 pm		at McNeese State	W 59–50	13–17 (8–9)	H&HP Complex (2,426); Lake Charles, LA
Mar 9, 2019; 5:00 pm		Houston Baptist	W 76–69	14–17 (9–9)	American Bank Center (1,059); Corpus Christi, TX
Southland tournament
Mar 13, 2019; 7:30 pm, ESPN+	(6)	vs. (7) Central Arkansas; First round	L 53–73	14–18	Leonard E. Merrell Center (1,650); Katy, TX
*Non-conference game. ^{#}Rankings from AP Poll. (#) Tournament seedings in parentheses.

== See also ==
- 2018–19 Texas A&M–Corpus Christi Islanders women's basketball team
