= 2019 Southland Conference men's basketball tournament =

Regional basketball tournament

- Classification: Division I
- Season: 2018–19
- Teams: 8
- Site: Merrell Center; Katy, Texas
- Champions: Abilene Christian (1 title)
- Winning coach: Joe Golding (1 title)
- MVP: Jaren Lewis (Abilene Christian)
- Television: ESPN+, ESPN2

2018–19 Southland Conference men's basketball standings
	Conf.				Overall
Team	W		L	PCT	W		L	PCT
Sam Houston State	16	–	2	.889	21	–	12	.636
Abilene Christian †	14	–	4	.778	27	–	7	.794
Southeastern Louisiana	12	–	6	.667	17	–	16	.515
New Orleans	12	–	6	.667	19	–	14	.576
Lamar	12	–	6	.667	20	–	13	.606
Texas A&M–CC	9	–	9	.500	14	–	18	.438
Central Arkansas	8	–	10	.444	14	–	19	.424
Houston Baptist	8	–	10	.444	12	–	18	.400
Stephen F. Austin	7	–	11	.389	14	–	16	.467
Nicholls	7	–	11	.389	14	–	17	.452
Northwestern State	6	–	12	.333	11	–	20	.355
McNeese State	5	–	13	.278	9	–	22	.290
Incarnate Word	1	–	17	.056	6	–	25	.194
† 2019 Southland tournament winner

The 2019 Southland Conference men's basketball tournament was the postseason men's basketball tournament for the 2018–19 season in the Southland Conference. The tournament was held at the Merrell Center in Katy, Texas from March 13 to March 16, 2019. The tournament winner, Abilene Christian, received an automatic invitation to the 2019 NCAA Division I men's basketball tournament.

== Seeds ==
Teams were seeded by record within the conference, with a tie-breaker system to seed teams with identical conference records. Only the top eight teams in the conference qualified for the tournament. The top two seeds received double byes into the semifinals in the merit-based format. The No. 3 and No. 4 seeds received single byes to the quarterfinals. Sam Houston State clinched a double bye, and won the 2019 Southland regular-season title on February 27. Because of this, the Bearkats clinched the 1 seed. New Orleans, Lamar, Abilene Christian and Southeast Louisiana qualified for the tournament. Abilene Christian and Southeastern Louisiana clinched the 2nd and 3rd seeds, respectively, with wins on March 6.

Seed	School	Conference	Tie-breaker 1
1	Sam Houston State	16–2	
2	Abilene Christian	14–4	
3	Southeastern Louisiana	12–6	2–1 vs. Lamar/New Orleans, 1–1 vs. Abilene Christian
4	New Orleans	12–6	2–1 vs. SELA/Lamar, 0–1 vs. Abilene Christian
5	Lamar	12–6	0–2 vs. SELA/New Orleans
6	Texas A&M–CC	9–9	
7	Central Arkansas	8–10	1–1 vs. Sam Houston State
8	Houston Baptist	8–10	0–2 vs. Sam Houston State

== Schedule ==
Session	Game	Time*	Matchup^{#}	Score	Television
First round – Wednesday, March 13, 2019
1	1	5:00 pm	No. 5 Lamar vs. No. 8 Houston Baptist	81–79	ESPN+
1	2	7:30 pm	No. 6 Texas A&M–CC vs. No. 7 Central Arkansas	53–73	ESPN+
Second round – Thursday, March 14, 2019
2	3	5:00 pm	No. 4 New Orleans vs. No. 5 Lamar	76–72	ESPN+
2	4	7:30 pm	No. 3 Southeastern Louisiana vs. No. 7 Central Arkansas	79–65	ESPN+
Semifinals – Friday, March 15, 2019
3	5	5:00 pm	No. 1 Sam Houston State vs. No. 4 New Orleans	76–79	ESPN+
3	6	7:30 pm	No. 2 Abilene Christian vs. No. 3 Southeastern Louisiana	69–66	ESPN+
Championship – Saturday, March 16, 2019
4	7	8:30 pm	No. 4 New Orleans vs. No. 2 Abilene Christian	60–77	ESPN2
*Game times in CDT. #-Rankings denote tournament seeding.

== Bracket ==
First round Wednesday, March 13; ESPN+
5	Lamar	81
8	Houston Baptist	79
6	Texas A&M–CC	53
7	Central Arkansas	73

Second round Thursday, March 14; ESPN+
4	New Orleans	76
5	Lamar	72
3	Southeastern Louisiana	79
7	Central Arkansas	65

Semifinals; Friday, March 15; ESPN+
1	Sam Houston State	76
4	New Orleans	79
2	Abilene Christian	69
3	Southeastern Louisiana	66

Championship; Saturday, March 16; ESPN2
4	New Orleans	60
2	Abilene Christian	77

== Awards and honors ==
Tournament MVP: Jaren Lewis (Abilene Christian)
All-Tournament Team:

- Jaren Lewis (Abilene Christian)
- Jaylen Franklin (Abilene Christian)
- Payten Ricks (Abilene Christian)
- Scott Plaisance Jr. (New Orleans)
- Josh Nzeakor (Lamar)

== See also ==
- 2019 Southland Conference women's basketball tournament
- Southland Conference men's basketball tournament
