= 2018–19 Northwestern State Demons basketball team =

American college basketball season

2018–19 Northwestern State Demons basketball
- Conference: Southland Conference
- Record: 11–20 (6–12 Southland)
- Head coach: Mike McConathy (20th season)
- Assistant coaches: Jeff Moore; Bill Lewit; Jacob Spielbauer
- Home arena: Prather Coliseum

2018–19 Southland Conference men's basketball standings
	Conf.				Overall
Team	W		L	PCT	W		L	PCT
Sam Houston State	16	–	2	.889	21	–	12	.636
Abilene Christian †	14	–	4	.778	27	–	7	.794
Southeastern Louisiana	12	–	6	.667	17	–	16	.515
New Orleans	12	–	6	.667	19	–	14	.576
Lamar	12	–	6	.667	20	–	13	.606
Texas A&M–CC	9	–	9	.500	14	–	18	.438
Central Arkansas	8	–	10	.444	14	–	19	.424
Houston Baptist	8	–	10	.444	12	–	18	.400
Stephen F. Austin	7	–	11	.389	14	–	16	.467
Nicholls	7	–	11	.389	14	–	17	.452
Northwestern State	6	–	12	.333	11	–	20	.355
McNeese State	5	–	13	.278	9	–	22	.290
Incarnate Word	1	–	17	.056	6	–	25	.194
† 2019 Southland tournament winner

The 2018–19 Northwestern State Demons basketball team represented Northwestern State University during the 2018–19 NCAA Division I men's basketball season. The Demons, led by 20th-year head coach Mike McConathy, played their home games at Prather Coliseum in Natchitoches, Louisiana as members of the Southland Conference. They finished the season 11–20 overall, 6–12 in Southland play to finish in 11th place. Since only the top eight teams are eligible for the Southland tournament, Northwestern State failed to qualify this season.

== Previous season ==
The Demons finished 2017–18 the season 4–25, 1–17 in Southland play to finish in last place. They failed to qualify for the Southland tournament.

== Roster ==
2018–19 Northwestern State Demons men's basketball team
Players
Coaches

Pos.	#	Name	Height	Weight	Year	Hometown
G	0	C.J. Jones	5 ft 10 in (1.78 m)	160 lb (73 kg)	So	Monroe, Louisiana
G	1	LaTerrance Reed	5 ft 10 in (1.78 m)	190 lb (86 kg)	Jr	Buffalo, New York
G	2	Bryan White	5 ft 6 in (1.68 m)	160 lb (73 kg)	Fr	Natchitoches, Louisiana
G	3	Alex Comanita	6 ft 4 in (1.93 m)	195 lb (88 kg)	Fr	Toronto, Canada
G	10	Malik Metoyer	6 ft 7 in (2.01 m)	200 lb (91 kg)	Sr	Clarence, Louisiana
G	12	John Norvel	6 ft 4 in (1.93 m)	190 lb (86 kg)	Jr	Slidell, Louisiana
G	13	Jacob Guest	6 ft 4 in (1.93 m)	190 lb (86 kg)	Jr	Bossier City, Louisiana
F/C	20	Ishmael Lane	6 ft 8 in (2.03 m)	250 lb (113 kg)	Sr	Port Allen, Louisiana
G	21	Vontay Ott	6 ft 3 in (1.91 m)	185 lb (84 kg)	So	Victorville, California
G	22	DeAndre Love	6 ft 4 in (1.93 m)	190 lb (86 kg)	Sr	Seattle, Washington
F	23	Darian Dixon	6 ft 8 in (2.03 m)	220 lb (100 kg)	So	Bowie, Maryland
C	32	Larry Owens	6 ft 8 in (2.03 m)	260 lb (118 kg)	So	Monroe, Louisiana
F	34	Brandon Hutton	6 ft 5 in (1.96 m)	215 lb (98 kg)	Jr	Chicago, Illinois
F	35	Dalin Williams	6 ft 8 in (2.03 m)	215 lb (98 kg)	Fr	Stinnett, Texas

Head coach

- Mike McConathy (Louisiana Tech)

Assistant coach(es)

- Jeff Moore (Missouri Valley)
- Bill Lewit (Salisbury)
- Jacob Spielbauer (William Penn)

Legend

- (C) Team captain
- (S) Suspended
- (I) Ineligible
- (W) Walk-on
- Injured
- Current redshirt

Roster
Last update: January 26, 2018

== Schedule and results ==
Date time, TV	Opponent	Result	Record	Site (attendance) city, state
Non-conference regular season
Nov 6, 2018*; 8:00 pm	Centenary	W 102–62	1–0	Prather Coliseum (1,720); Natchitoches, LA
Nov 8, 2018*; 7:00 pm	at SMU	L 58–69	1–1	Moody Coliseum (5,605); University Park, TX
Nov 13, 2018*; 6:00 pm, BYU Sports Network	at BYU; Men Against Breast Cancer Cup	L 57–82	1–2	Marriott Center (10,886); Provo, UT
Nov 17, 2018*; 2:00 pm	at Rice; Men Against Breast Cancer Cup	L 74–102	1–3	Tudor Fieldhouse (1,220); Houston, TX
Nov 19, 2018*; 7:00 pm	at Houston; Men Against Breast Cancer Cup	W 82-55	1-4	H&PE Arena (3,784); Houston, TX
Nov 23, 2018*; 6:30 pm	Alabama A&M; Men Against Breast Cancer Cup	W 70-66 ^{OT}	2-4	Prather Coliseum (720); Natchitoches, LA
Nov 27, 2018*; 6:30 pm	Louisiana–Monroe	L 52-80	2-5	Prather Coliseum (1,305); Natchitoches, LA
Dec 1, 2018*; 8:00 pm	at UTEP	L 47-77	2-6	Don Haskins Center (4,670); El Paso, TX
Dec 3, 2018*; 7:00 pm, SECN	at Texas A&M	L 59–80	2-7	Reed Arena (4,805); College Station, TX
Dec 12, 2018*; 6:30 pm, FSSW	at No. 11 Texas Tech	L 44-79	2-8	United Supermarkets Arena (10,086); Lubbock, TX
Dec 15, 2018*; 7:30 pm	vs. Southern; Shreveport–Bossier Holiday Classic	W 69-66	3-8	Gold Dome (617); Shreveport, LA
Dec 18, 2018*; 6:30 pm	Louisiana College	W 84–64	4–8	Prather Coliseum (920); Natchitoches, LA
Dec 30, 2018*; 4:00 pm	Champion Christian College	W 86–65	5–8	Prather Coliseum (712); Natchitoches, LA
Southland regular season
Jan 2, 2019; 6:30 pm	Nicholls State	L 72–78	5–9 (0–1)	Prather Coliseum (802); Natchitoches, LA
Jan 5, 2019; 3:00 pm	McNeese State	W 66–61	6–9 (1–1)	Prather Coliseum (1,620); Natchitoches, LA
Jan 9, 2019; 6:30 pm	Texas A&M–Corpus Christi	L 61–62	6–10 (1–2)	Prather Coliseum (1,214); Natchitoches, LA
Jan 12, 2019; 4:30 pm, ESPN3	at Stephen F. Austin	W 61–59	7–10 (2–2)	William R. Johnson Coliseum (2,758); Nacogdoches, TX
Jan 19, 2019; 6:00 pm	at Abilene Christian	L 69–78	7–11 (2–3)	Moody Coliseum (1,199); Abilene, TX
Jan 23, 2019; 6:30 pm	Sam Houston State	L 64–78	7–12 (2–4)	Prather Coliseum (1,501); Natchitoches, LA
Jan 26, 2019; 3:00 pm	Southeastern Louisiana	L 53–69	7–13 (2–5)	Prather Coliseum; Natchitoches, LA
Jan 30, 2019; 7:00 pm	at New Orleans	L 64–72	7–14 (2–6)	Lakefront Arena (607); New Orleans, LA
Feb 2, 2019; 4:00 pm	at Central Arkansas	W 80–75	8–14 (3–6)	Farris Center (912); Conway, AR
Feb 6, 2019; 6:30 pm	New Orleans	L 73–81	8–15 (3–7)	Prather Coliseum (1,520); Natchitoches, LA
Feb 9, 2019; 3:00 pm	at McNeese State	W 74–72	9–15 (4–7)	H&HP Complex (2,722); Lake Charles, LA
Feb 13, 2019; 7:00 pm, ESPN3	at Lamar	L 70–75	9–16 (4–8)	Montagne Center (1,890); Beaumont, TX
Feb 16, 2019; 3:00 pm	Stephen F. Austin	W 87–72	10–16 (5–8)	Prather Coliseum (2,020); Natchitoches, LA
Feb 20, 2019; 7:00 pm	at Houston Baptist	L 54–92	10–17 (5–9)	Sharp Gymnasium (634); Houston, TX
Feb 27, 2019; 6:30 pm	Incarnate Word	W 68–60	11–17 (6–9)	Prather Coliseum (1,124); Natchitoches, LA
Mar 2, 2019; 4:00 pm	at Southeastern Louisiana	L 55–69	11–18 (6–10)	University Center (778); Hammond, LA
Mar 6, 2019	at Nicholls State	L 60–83	11–19 (6–11)	Stopher Gymnasium (501); Thibodaux, LA
Mar 9, 2019; 3:00 pm	Central Arkansas	L 63–70	11–20 (6–12)	Prather Coliseum (1,410); Natchitoches, LA
*Non-conference game. ^{#}Rankings from AP Poll. (#) Tournament seedings in parentheses. All times are in Central Time.

== See also ==
- 2018–19 Northwestern State Lady Demons basketball team
