= Marlain Veal =

American basketball player (born 1996)

Free agent
- Position: Point guard

Personal information
- Born: April 21, 1996 (age 30) Gretna, Louisiana
- Listed height: 5 ft 9 in (1.75 m)
- Listed weight: 155 lb (70 kg)

Career information
- High school: McDonogh 35 (New Orleans, Louisiana); Helen Cox (Harvey, Louisiana)
- College: Southeastern Louisiana (2015–2019)
- NBA draft: 2019: undrafted
- Playing career: 2019–present

Career history
- 2019–2020: Final Spor Gençlik
- 2020–2021: Ironi Kiryat Ata
- 2021: Bnei Herzliya
- 2021–2022: Yeni Mamak
- 2022–2023: Sichuan Blue Whales
- 2023–2024: Iğdır Basketbol
- 2024: South Bay Lakers

Career highlights
- Southland Defensive Player of the Year (2018); 2× First-team All-Southland (2018, 2019); Third-team All-Southland (2017)

Marlain Guy Veal (born April 21, 1996) is an American professional basketball player who last played for the South Bay Lakers of the NBA G League. He played college basketball for the Southeastern Louisiana Lions.

== Early life ==
Veal was born in Gretna, Louisiana, to Patrick Roublow and Swylita Veal. He has five brothers and sisters. He is 5-9 (175 cm tall), and weighs 145 pounds (66 kg). He said: "A lot of schools said I was too small.... That's why I play with a chip on my shoulder."

He attended Helen Cox High School, and graduated in 2015. Veal had transferred to Cox from McDonogh 35 before his sophomore season. Playing for Cox basketball, Veal averaged 15.3 points, 4.0 rebounds, 4.0 assists, and 2.0 steals per game in his senior year. He was Louisiana Sports Writers Association’s (LSWA) 5A Player of the Year, NOLA.com/The Times-Picayune Large Schools Player of the Year, District 8-5A MVP. All-State, All-District, and The New Orleans Advocate All-Metro.

== College career ==
Veal attended Southeastern Louisiana University, majoring in communications. He had a successful career; 3 selections to the All-Southland conference (2 First-Team), 2 Southland Defensive Player of the Year awards, and 2 All-Defensive team selections.

== Professional career ==
Veal played for Final Spor Gençlik in the Turkish TBL in 2019–20, averaging 23.1 points, 7.3 assists, and 2.0 steals per game.

For the 2020–21 season, Veal played for Bnei Herzliya in the Israeli Basketball Premier League. He plays the point guard position.

For the 2022–23 season, Veal is playing for Sichuan Blue Whales in the Chinese Basketball Association.

=== South Bay Lakers (2024) ===
On October 26, 2024, Veal joined the South Bay Lakers. However, he was waived on December 6.
