= Cameron Delaney (basketball) =

American basketball player (born 1995)

Raiffeisen Flyers Wels
- Position: Shooting guard
- League: Austrian Basketball Superliga

Personal information
- Born: October 24, 1995 (age 31)
- Listed height: 6 ft 4 in (1.93 m)
- Listed weight: 205 lb (93 kg)

Career information
- High school: Harker Heights (Harker Heights, Texas)
- College: Denver (2014–2015); Sam Houston State (2016–2019)
- NBA draft: 2019: undrafted
- Playing career: 2019–present

Career history
- 2019–2020: Raiffeisen Flyers Wels
- 2020–2021: Phoenix Hagen
- 2021–present: Raiffeisen Flyers Wels

Career highlights
- AP Honorable Mention All-American (2019); Southland Player of the Year (2019); First–team All-Southland (2019)

Cameron Delaney (born October 24, 1995) is an American basketball player for Raiffeisen Flyers Wels of the Austrian Basketball League. He played college basketball at the University of Denver and Sam Houston State University. he was named Southland Conference Player of the Year in 2019.

Delaney attended Harker Heights High School in Texas, ultimately choosing to play in college for coach Joe Scott at Denver. He averaged 2.4 points and 1.7 rebounds per game as a freshman. However, after his freshman season he chose to transfer to Sam Houston State, where he rejoined his identical twin brother Josh to form a formidable three-point shooting duo. For his senior season, Delaney averaged 13.4 points and 5.5 rebounds per game and led the Bearkats to a regular season Southland Conference title. Delaney was named first-team All-conference and the Southland Player of the Year for his efforts.

After going undrafted in the 2019 NBA draft, Delaney signed with Raiffeisen Flyers Wels of the Austrian Basketball League on August 19, 2019. Delaney averaged 13.7 points, 6.9 rebounds, 2.3 assists and a steal per game. On August 6, 2020, he signed with Phoenix Hagen of the German ProA league. Delaney averaged 11.8 points, 3.1 rebounds and 1.5 assists per game but left the team in February 2021. On September 9, 2021, he returned to Raiffeisen Flyers Wels.
