= Eleven Sports =

Defunct sports TV channel network based in the UK

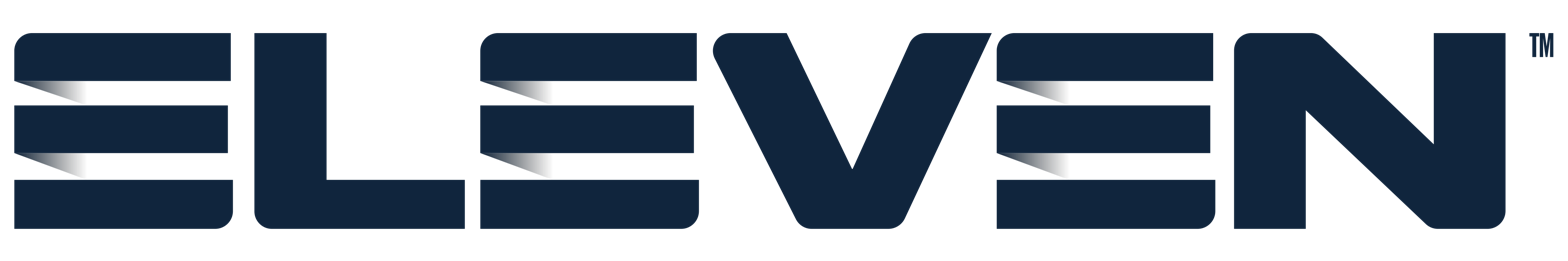
- Industry: Sports broadcasting
- Founded: 2015
- Founder: Andrea Radrizzani
- Defunct: 15 February 2023 (Excluding Poland)
- Fate: Acquired by DAZN Group Acquired by Polsat (Poland)
- Headquarters: London, United Kingdom
- Areas served: Worldwide
- Key people: Andrea Radrizzani, Executive Chairman; Marc Watson, Chief Executive Officer; Guillaume Collard, Group Chief Rights Acquisitions Officer; Graham Wallace, Aser Group Chief Corporate & Financial Officer; Pedro Presa, Group Chief Direct to Consumer Officer; John West, Team Whistle Founder & Executive Chairman
- Number of employees: 300 (2021)

Eleven Sports is a multinational sports and entertainment media group headquartered in the United Kingdom.

Eleven Sports' business model initially centred around the acquisition of major international sports rights in smaller countries. The company operates a network of linear television and/or digital services, broadcasting a mix of premium, niche, and grassroots sports as well as original programming, and provided SaaS livestreaming services.

In September 2022, Eleven Sports was acquired by DAZN Group. Its business operations were subsequently integrated into relevant operations of its own sports streaming platform DAZN.

== History ==
Eleven Sports first launched in Belgium and Luxembourg in 2015 with a linear and OTT service.

In February 2016, Eleven Sports acquired Polish rights to Formula One. In July 2016, Eleven Sports acquired rights to the English Premier League in Taiwan. Both of the properties were marketed by Radrizzani's sister company MP & Silva.

On 16 March 2017, Eleven Sports announced that it had acquired "certain distribution assets" of the fledgling U.S. international sports channel One World Sports, which had been replaced by a U.S. version of Eleven Sports Network in advance of the announcement. Financial details of the sale were not disclosed.

In May 2017, Eleven Sports acquired a majority share of Italian provider Sportube, which was renamed in September of that year. As of 2021, Eleven Sports Italy offers Serie C, volleyball, waterpolo, handball, basketball and more to fans.

On 9 January 2018, Eleven announced that it would televise 120 games in the 2017–18 NBA G League season in the United States.

In May 2018, Eleven Sports secured a three-year deal to broadcast La Liga football matches in the UK and Ireland, which had been previously broadcast on Sky Sports. Two months later, they secured exclusive UK three-year deals to screen Serie A matches, previously broadcast by BT Sport, the Eredivisie and the Chinese Super League (both previously televised by Sky Sports) and Sweden's Allsvenskan but in January 2019, Eleven Sports dropped its rights to Serie A and Eredivisie football, passing on the rights to Premier Sports. Premier Sports also won the rights to the Chinese Super League and Swedish Allsvenskan, leaving Eleven with exclusive La Liga, Segunda Division play-offs, Copa del Rey, and Supercopa rights until at least the end of the season.

Also in May 2018, Eleven sold a 50% stake in its Polish operations to Telewizja Polsat for around €38 million.

In 2018, Eleven Sports launched services in Myanmar under the brand MY Sports, which broadcasts fixtures of Myanmar national team, U-23, U-21, U-18 teams and also exclusively broadcast Myanmar National League, General Aung San Shield, Serie A, FA Cup and Chinese Super League. They also have partnerships with MRTV-4, Channel 7, MRTV, Mizzima TV and Fortune TV for broadcasting football matches under MY Sports.

In March 2019, Eleven renewed its rights to Formula One in Poland through 2022, also sub-licensing highlights to Polsat and race replays to TVP. It also launched services in Japan as its eleventh market, streaming games from NPB Farm League teams with associated digital coverage. In July 2019, nearly the remainder of Eleven Sports Poland was sold to Polsat, with Radrizzani maintaining a single share. In July 2019, Eleven Sports UK began to wind down operations, with Radrizzani admitting that trying to compete with the existing duopoly of Sky Sports and BT Sport was a "mistake".

In June 2020, Eleven acquired rights to Pro League, Division B, and Women's Super League football in Belgium through the 2024–25 season, and later announced a partnership with Mediapro for the rights as part of a larger series of projects.

In August 2020, the company announced a repositioning referred to as "Eleven 2.0", including a refocus (initially in Belgium, Italy, and Portugal) to include more "premium" sports rights, and also launching new verticals for women's sports, local sports ("Eleven Next"), and esports. A new logo rebranding the broadcaster as "Eleven" was also introduced.

In October 2020, Eleven acquired rights to the Football Association of Thailand for the remainder of the calendar year.

In November 2020, Eleven acquired MyCujoo, which was integrated in 2021 to form a larger consumer streaming business.

In March 2021, Eleven acquired Team Whistle, an American digital media company focused on sports-related content.

In April 2022, Eleven announced that they would be supporting the delivery of the FIFA OTT platform FIFA+.

In September 2022, DAZN Group announced that it would acquire Eleven's sports media businesses, in a sale completed 15 February 2023. The agreement did not include its operations in Japan (where the service transitioned to the brand Easy Sports), and its Polish operations (which Polsat acquired the remaining share of later that year). The company began to merge Eleven's operations into the DAZN business in 2023, and used its existing customer base to launch the DAZN service in Belgium, Portugal, and Taiwan.

== See also ==
- Next Level Sports, formerly Eleven Sports' outlet in the United States
