= 2018–19 Southeastern Louisiana Lions basketball team =

American college basketball season

2018–19 Southeastern Louisiana Lions basketball
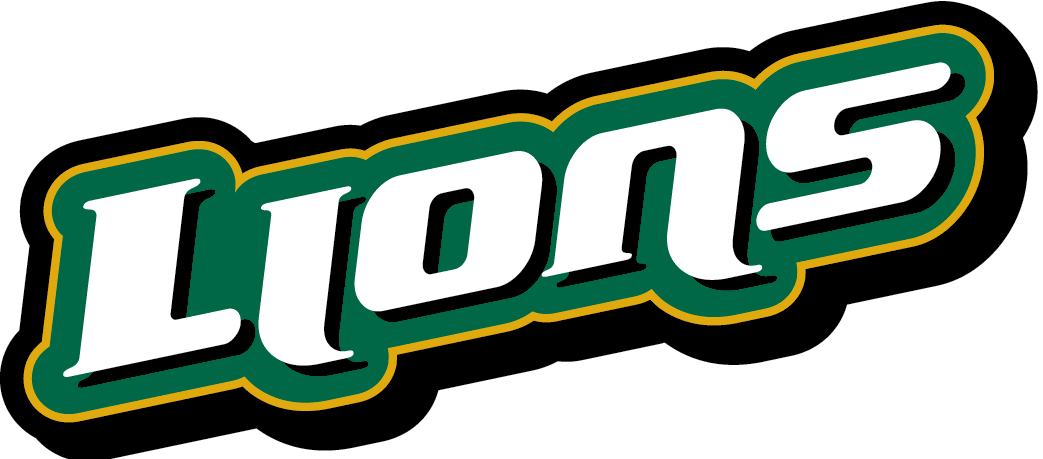
- Conference: Southland Conference
- Record: 17–16 (12–6 Southland)
- Head coach: Jay Ladner (5th season)
- Assistant coaches: David Kiefer; Joey Stiebing; Kyle Roane
- Home arena: University Center (Capacity: 7,500)

2018–19 Southland Conference men's basketball standings
	Conf.				Overall
Team	W		L	PCT	W		L	PCT
Sam Houston State	16	–	2	.889	21	–	12	.636
Abilene Christian †	14	–	4	.778	27	–	7	.794
Southeastern Louisiana	12	–	6	.667	17	–	16	.515
New Orleans	12	–	6	.667	19	–	14	.576
Lamar	12	–	6	.667	20	–	13	.606
Texas A&M–CC	9	–	9	.500	14	–	18	.438
Central Arkansas	8	–	10	.444	14	–	19	.424
Houston Baptist	8	–	10	.444	12	–	18	.400
Stephen F. Austin	7	–	11	.389	14	–	16	.467
Nicholls	7	–	11	.389	14	–	17	.452
Northwestern State	6	–	12	.333	11	–	20	.355
McNeese State	5	–	13	.278	9	–	22	.290
Incarnate Word	1	–	17	.056	6	–	25	.194
† 2019 Southland tournament winner

The 2018–19 Southeastern Louisiana Lions basketball team represented Southeastern Louisiana University during the 2018–19 NCAA Division I men's basketball season. The Lions were led by fifth-year head coach Jay Ladner, and played their home games at the University Center in Hammond, Louisiana as members of the Southland Conference. They finished the season 17–16 overall, 12–6 in Southland play to finish in a three-way tie for third place. As the No. 3 seed in the Southland tournament, they advanced to the semifinals, where they lost to Abilene Christian.

== Previous season ==
The Lions finished the 2017–18 season 22–12, 15–3 in Southland play to finish in a tie for the Southland regular season championship with Nicholls State. As the No. 1 seed in the Southland tournament, they defeated Sam Houston State in the semifinals before losing in the championship game to Stephen F. Austin. As a regular season champion, and No. 1 seed in their conference tournament, who failed to win their conference tournament, they received an automatic bid to the National Invitation Tournament where they lost in the first round to Saint Mary's.

== Roster ==
2018–19 Southeastern Louisiana Lions men's basketball team
Players
Coaches

Pos.	#	Name	Height	Weight	Year	Hometown
G	0	Marlain Veal	5 ft 9 in (1.75 m)	145 lb (66 kg)	Sr	New Orleans, LA
G	1	Jeremiah Saunders	6 ft 3 in (1.91 m)	200 lb (91 kg)	Fr	Fort Lauderdale, FL
F	2	Pape Diop	6 ft 9 in (2.06 m)	205 lb (93 kg)	So	Ziguinchor, Senegal
G	3	Parker Edwards	6 ft 3 in (1.91 m)	195 lb (88 kg)	Fr	Mandeville, LA
G	4	D'Angelo West	6 ft 4 in (1.93 m)	195 lb (88 kg)	Sr	Jackson, MS
G	5	Kajon Brown	6 ft 5 in (1.96 m)	200 lb (91 kg)	Sr	Harvey, LA
G	10	Von Julien	6 ft 1 in (1.85 m)	160 lb (73 kg)	Jr	Reserve, LA
SG	11	Chris Meija	6 ft 3 in (1.91 m)	190 lb (86 kg)	So	Hialeah Gardens, FL
G	12	Matthew Strange	5 ft 11 in (1.8 m)	165 lb (75 kg)	Fr	The Woodlands, TX
F	13	Moses Greenwood	6 ft 7 in (2.01 m)	221 lb (100 kg)	Sr	Sharon, MS
F	15	Maxwell Starwood	6 ft 9 in (2.06 m)	250 lb (113 kg)	So	Baton Rouge, LA
SF	20	Brandon Gonzalez	6 ft 6 in (1.98 m)	200 lb (91 kg)	So	Punta Gorda, FL
F	21	Willie Lapoole	6 ft 9 in (2.06 m)	220 lb (100 kg)	Fr	Monroe, LA
F	22	Patrick Bossetta	6 ft 3 in (1.91 m)	210 lb (95 kg)	So	Folsom, LA
G	23	Quinton Thomas	6 ft 2 in (1.88 m)	175 lb (79 kg)	Sr	Baton Rouge, LA
G	24	Keith Charleston	6 ft 8 in (2.03 m)	207 lb (94 kg)	Sr	Little Rock, AR
F	25	Ty Brewer	6 ft 7 in (2.01 m)	210 lb (95 kg)	Fr	Meridian, MS

Head coach

- Jay Ladner (Southern Miss)

Assistant coach(es)

- David Kiefer (Kansas State)
- Joey Stiebing (New Orleans)
- Kyle Roane (Southern Miss)

Legend

- (C) Team captain
- (S) Suspended
- (I) Ineligible
- (W) Walk-on
- Injured
- Current redshirt

Roster

== Schedule and results ==
Date time, TV	Rank^{#}	Opponent^{#}	Result	Record	Site (attendance) city, state
Exhibition
Oct 30, 2018*; 7:00 pm		Delta State	W 68–63	–	University Center (502); Hammond, LA
Non-conference regular season
Nov 6, 2018*; 7:30 pm, SECN+		at No. 23 LSU	L 63–94	0–1	Pete Maravich Assembly Center (10,513); Baton Rouge, LA
Nov 9, 2018*; 7:00 pm		William Carey; Hall of Fame Classic campus-site	W 78–57	1–1	University Center (656); Hammond, LA
Nov 11, 2018*; 3:00 pm, ESPNU		at Nebraska; Hall of Fame Classic campus-site	L 35–87	1–2	Pinnacle Bank Arena (15,462); Lincoln, NE
Nov 13, 2018*; 6:30 pm, Fox Sports Southwest		at Texas Tech; Hall of Fame Classic campus-site	L 40–59	1–3	United Supermarkets Arena (8,650); Lubbock, TX
Nov 17, 2018*; 4:00 pm		Stetson; Hall of Fame Classic campus-site	W 69–57	2–3	University Center (541); Hammond, LA
Nov 20, 2018*; 7:00 pm		at Mississippi Valley State; Hall of Fame Classic campus-site	L 59–69	2–4	Harrison HPER Complex (188); Itta Bena, MS
Nov 26, 2018*; 7:00 pm		Louisiana College	W 86–71	3–4	University Center (692); Hammond, LA
Dec 1, 2018*; 3:30 pm, CST		at Tulane	W 62–61	4–4	Devlin Fieldhouse (1,743); New Orleans, LA
Dec 12, 2018*; 6:30 pm, SECN+		vs. Ole Miss; Jackson Showcase	L 47–69	4–5	Mississippi Coliseum (3,564); Jackson, MS
Dec 17, 2018*; 7:30 pm		California Baptist	L 52-73	4-6	University Center (559); Hammond, LA
Dec 19, 2018*; 6:00 pm		at Grambling State	L 68–69	4–7	Fredrick C. Hobdy Assembly Center (119); Grambling, LA
Dec 22, 2018*; 1:00 pm, ESPN+		at Bradley	L 60–63	4–8	Carver Arena (5,004); Peoria, IL
Dec 29, 2018*; 4:00 pm		Louisiana	L 72–73	4–9	University Center (772); Hammond, LA
Southland regular season
Jan 2, 2019; 6:30 pm, ESPN+		at Stephen F. Austin	L 60–65	4–10 (0–1)	William R. Johnson Coliseum (3,124); Nacogdoches, TX
Jan 5, 2019; 4:00 pm		Central Arkansas	L 71–73	4–11 (0–2)	University Center; Hammond, LA
Jan 12, 2019; 4:00 pm		Abilene Christian	L 72–75	4–12 (0–3)	University Center (563); Hammond, LA
Jan 16, 2019; 7:00 pm		Lamar	W 76–69	5–12 (1–3)	University Center (605); Hammond, LA
Jan 19, 2019; 1:30 pm		at McNeese State	W 74–71	6–12 (2–3)	H&HP Complex (2,497); Lake Charles, LA
Jan 23, 2019; 7:00 pm		at Houston Baptist	W 70–67	7–12 (3–3)	Sharp Gymnasium (678); Houston, TX
Jan 26, 2019; 3:00 pm		at Northwestern State	W 69–53	8–12 (4–3)	Prather Coliseum (1,400); Natchitoches, LA
Jan 30, 2019; 7:00 pm		Sam Houston State	L 52–62	8–13 (4–4)	University Center (1,029); Hammond, LA
Feb 2, 2019; 4:00 pm, ESPN3		Nicholls State	W 91–70	9–13 (5–4)	University Center (879); Hammond, LA
Feb 6, 2019; 7:00 pm		at Texas A&M–Corpus Christi	W 64–58	10–13 (6–4)	American Bank Center (1,400); Corpus Christi, TX
Feb 9, 2019; 4:00 pm		at Central Arkansas	W 75–67	11–13 (7–4)	Farris Center (1,825); Conway, AR
Feb 13, 2019; 7:00 pm		Incarnate Word	W 70–64	12–13 (8–4)	University Center (666); Hammond, LA
Feb 16, 2019; 4:00 pm		McNeese State	W 88–52	13–13 (9–4)	University Center (884); Hammond, LA
Feb 20, 2019; 7:00 pm		at New Orleans	L 68–89	13–14 (9–5)	Lakefront Arena (813); New Orleans, LA
Feb 23, 2019; 3:30 pm, ESPN3		at Abilene Christian	W 75–66	14–14 (10–5)	Moody Coliseum (1,399); Abilene, TX
Mar 2, 2019; 4:00 pm		Northwestern State	W 69–55	15–14 (11–5)	University Center (778); Hammond, LA
Mar 6, 2019; 7:00 pm		New Orleans	W 81–67	16–14 (12–5)	University Center (771); Hammond, LA
Mar 9, 2019; 3:30 pm		at Nicholls State	L 63–69	16–15 (12–6)	Stopher Gym (540); Thibodaux, LA
Southland tournament
Mar 14, 2019; 7:30 pm, ESPN+	(3)	vs. (7) Central Arkansas; Second round	W 79–65	17–15	Leonard E. Merrell Center (960); Katy, TX
Mar 15, 2019; 7:30 pm, ESPN+	(3)	vs. (2) Abilene Christian; Semifinals	L 66–69	17–16	Leonard E. Merrell Center (2,100); Katy, TX
*Non-conference game. ^{#}Rankings from AP Poll. (#) Tournament seedings in parentheses. All times are in Central Time.

== See also ==
- 2018–19 Southeastern Louisiana Lady Lions basketball team
