= 2018–19 Jackson State Tigers basketball team =

American college basketball season

2018–19 Jackson State Tigers basketball
- Conference: Southwestern Athletic Conference
- Record: 13–19 (10–8 SWAC)
- Head coach: Wayne Brent (6th season)
- Assistant coaches: Cason Burk; De'Suan Dixon
- Home arena: Williams Assembly Center

2018–19 SWAC men's basketball standings
	Conf.				Overall
Team	W		L	PCT	W		L	PCT
Prairie View A&M †	17	–	1	.944	22	–	13	.629
Texas Southern	14	–	4	.778	24	–	14	.632
Jackson State	10	–	8	.556	13	–	19	.406
Grambling State	10	–	8	.556	17	–	17	.500
Arkansas–Pine Bluff	10	–	8	.556	13	–	19	.406
Alabama State	9	–	9	.500	12	–	19	.387
Southern	6	–	12	.333	7	–	25	.219
Alcorn State	6	–	12	.333	10	–	21	.323
Mississippi Valley State	4	–	14	.222	6	–	26	.188
Alabama A&M*	4	–	14	.222	5	–	27	.156
† 2019 SWAC tournament winner *ineligible for postseason due to APR violations

The 2018–19 Jackson State Tigers basketball team represented Jackson State University during the 2018–19 NCAA Division I men's basketball season. The Tigers were led by sixth-year head coach Wayne Brent, and played their home games at the Williams Assembly Center in Jackson, Mississippi as members of the Southwestern Athletic Conference. They finished the season 13–19 overall, 10–8 in SWAC play to finish in a three-way tie for third place. As the No. 3 seed in the SWAC tournament, they were upset by No. 6 seed Alabama State in the quarterfinals.

== Previous season ==
The Tigers finished the 2017–18 season 12–20, 9–9 in SWAC play to finish in sixth place. Due to Grambling State's ineligibility, they received the No. 5 seed in the SWAC tournament where they lost to Southern in the quarterfinals.

== Roster ==
2018–19 Jackson State Tigers men's basketball team
Players
Coaches

Pos.	#	Name	Height	Weight	Year	Hometown
G/F	0	Chace Franklin	6 ft 5 in (1.96 m)	195 lb (88 kg)	Sr	Dallas, Texas
G/F	1	Charles Taylor Jr.	6 ft 4 in (1.93 m)	190 lb (86 kg)	Jr	Washington, D.C.
G	2	Dontelius Ross	5 ft 10 in (1.78 m)	165 lb (75 kg)	Jr	Jackson, Mississippi
G	3	Julian Daughtry	6 ft 3 in (1.91 m)	195 lb (88 kg)	Jr	Memphis, Tennessee
G/F	4	Payton Wilson	6 ft 7 in (2.01 m)	210 lb (95 kg)	Jr	Tampa, Florida
G	5	Paris Collins	6 ft 4 in (1.93 m)	186 lb (84 kg)	Sr	San Antonio, Texas
G	11	Jeremiah Jefferson	6 ft 2 in (1.88 m)	183 lb (83 kg)	Jr	Glenn Heights, Texas
F	12	Maurice Rivers	6 ft 7 in (2.01 m)	205 lb (93 kg)	Jr	Atlanta, Georgia
G	13	Jordan Berry	6 ft 1 in (1.85 m)	170 lb (77 kg)	Fr	DeSoto, Texas
F	15	James Glenn	6 ft 7 in (2.01 m)	230 lb (104 kg)	Jr	Seattle, Washington
G	20	Tyler Berryhill	5 ft 10 in (1.78 m)	160 lb (73 kg)	Fr	Webb, Mississippi
C	21	Demetrice Clopton	6 ft 9 in (2.06 m)	255 lb (116 kg)	Fr	Columbus, Mississippi
F	22	Treshawn Bolden	6 ft 8 in (2.03 m)	250 lb (113 kg)	Sr	Jackson, Mississippi
F	23	Darius Austin	6 ft 7 in (2.01 m)	230 lb (104 kg)	Jr	Centreville, Illinois
G	24	Jeremiah Bozeman	6 ft 2 in (1.88 m)	175 lb (79 kg)	Fr	Alva, Oklahoma
G	25	Jesse Love	6 ft 1 in (1.85 m)	185 lb (84 kg)	So	Jackson, Mississippi
G	31	Lemmie Howard	6 ft 7 in (2.01 m)	200 lb (91 kg)	Fr	Belzoni, Mississippi
G	33	Justin Jordan	6 ft 5 in (1.96 m)	190 lb (86 kg)	RS Fr	Seattle, Washington

Head coach

- Wayne Brent (Louisiana–Monroe)

Assistant coach(es)

- Cason Burk
- De'Suan Dixon

Legend

- (C) Team captain
- (S) Suspended
- (I) Ineligible
- (W) Walk-on
- Injured
- Current redshirt

Roster
Last update: October 23, 2018

== Schedule and results ==
Date time, TV	Rank^{#}	Opponent^{#}	Result	Record	Site (attendance) city, state
Non-conference regular season
Nov 10, 2018*; 7:00 pm		Louisiana-Monroe	L 66–75	0–1	Williams Assembly Center (904); Jackson, MS
Nov 14, 2018*; 1:00 pm, ESPN+		at St. Bonaventure	L 36–67	0–2	Reilly Center (3,797); Olean, NY
Nov 16, 2018*; 9:00 pm		at Boise State; Cayman Islands Classic campus game	L 53–70	0–3	Taco Bell Arena (2,952); Boise, ID
Nov 19, 2018*; 3:00 pm		vs. Sam Houston State; Cayman Islands Classic Mainland semifinals	L 60–75	0–4	Freedom Hall Civic Center; Johnson City, TN
Nov 20, 2018*; 6:00 pm		vs. Chicago State; Cayman Islands Classic Mainland 3rd place game	W 81–68	1–4	Freedom Hall Civic Center; Johnson City, TN
Nov 24, 2018*; 9:00 pm		at San Diego	L 58–76	1–5	Jenny Craig Pavilion (1,211); San Diego, CA
Nov 27, 2018*; 9:30 pm		at San Diego State	L 44–87	1–6	Viejas Arena (10,453); San Diego, CA
Nov 29, 2018*; 9:00 pm		at Santa Clara	L 70–81	1–7	Leavey Center (1,029); Santa Clara, CA
Dec 8, 2018*; 9:00 pm		at Pepperdine	L 66–69	1–8	Firestone Fieldhouse (715); Malibu, CA
Dec 11, 2018*; 7:00 pm		Fisk	W 77–56	2–8	Williams Assembly Center (404); Jackson, MS
Dec 15, 2018*; 7:00 pm, ESPN+		at Murray State	L 57–74	2–9	CFSB Center (3,612); Murray, KY
Dec 22, 2018*; 12:00 pm, ESPN3		at Central Michigan	L 72–81	2–10	McGuirk Arena (1,689); Mount Pleasant, MI
Dec 29, 2018*; 7:00 pm		Miles	W 61–57	3–10	Williams Assembly Center (205); Jackson, MS
SWAC regular season
Jan 5, 2019; 6:00 pm		at Alabama A&M	W 54–51(OT)	4–10 (1–0)	Elmore Gymnasium (43); Normal, AL
Jan 7, 2019; 7:30 pm		at Alabama State	L 57–59	4–11 (1–1)	Dunn–Oliver Acadome (1,321); Montgomery, AL
Jan 12, 2019; 5:00 pm		Alcorn State	W 59–52	5–11 (2–1)	Williams Assembly Center (1,902); Jackson, MS
Jan 14, 2019; 7:30 pm		Southern	W 64–58	6–11 (3–1)	Williams Assembly Center (434); Jackson, MS
Jan 19, 2019; 5:00 pm		at Prairie View A&M	L 51–55	6–12 (3–2)	William J. Nicks Building (815); Prairie View, TX
Jan 21, 2019; 6:00 pm, ESPNU		at Texas Southern	L 65–75	6–13 (3–3)	H&PE Arena (2,227); Houston, TX
Jan 26, 2019; 5:00 pm		at Grambling State	W 65–63	7–13 (4–3)	Fredrick C. Hobdy Assembly Center (1,298); Grambling, LA
Feb 2, 2019; 4:30 pm		Mississippi Valley State	W 61–57	8–13 (5–3)	Williams Assembly Center (2,005); Jackson, MS
Feb 4, 2019; 7:30 pm		Arkansas–Pine Bluff	W 65–52	9–13 (6–3)	Williams Assembly Center (824); Jackson, MS
Feb 9, 2019; 5:30 pm		at Alcorn State	L 52–66	9–14 (6–4)	Davey Whitney Complex; Lorman, MS
Feb 11, 2019; 7:30 pm		at Southern	L 67–76	9–15 (6–5)	F. G. Clark Center; Baton Rouge, LA
Feb 16, 2019; 5:30 pm		Prairie View A&M	L 66–79	9–16 (6–6)	Williams Assembly Center; Jackson, MS
Feb 18, 2019; 7:30 pm		Texas Southern	L 65–77	9–17 (6–7)	Williams Assembly Center; Jackson, MS
Feb 23, 2019; 5:00 pm		Grambling State	W 71–60	10–17 (7–7)	Williams Assembly Center; Jackson, MS
Mar 2, 2019; 4:30 pm		at Mississippi Valley State	L 57–60	10–18 (7–8)	Harrison HPER Complex; Itta Bena, MS
Mar 4, 2019; 7:30 pm		at Arkansas-Pine Bluff	W 57–56	11–18 (8–8)	K. L. Johnson Complex; Pine Bluff, AR
Mar 7, 2019; 7:30 pm		Alabama A&M	W 66–47	12–18 (9–8)	Williams Assembly Center; Jackson, MS
Mar 9, 2019; 5:30 pm		Alabama State	W 82–70	13–18 (10–8)	Williams Assembly Center; Jackson, MS
SWAC tournament
Mar 12, 2019; 8:00 pm	(3)	(6) Alabama State; Quarterfinals	L 49–58	13–19	Williams Assembly Center; Jackson, MS
*Non-conference game. ^{#}Rankings from AP Poll. (#) Tournament seedings in parentheses. All times are in Central Time.
