= 2018–19 Alabama A&M Bulldogs basketball team =

American college basketball season

2018–19 Alabama A&M Bulldogs basketball
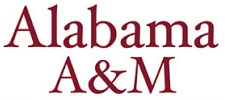
- Conference: Southwestern Athletic Conference
- Record: 5–27 (4–14 SWAC)
- Head coach: Dylan Howard (Interim 1st season)
- Assistant coaches: Derrick Tilmon; Antwain Banks; Carl Richburg
- Home arena: Elmore Gymnasium

2018–19 SWAC men's basketball standings
	Conf.				Overall
Team	W		L	PCT	W		L	PCT
Prairie View A&M †	17	–	1	.944	22	–	13	.629
Texas Southern	14	–	4	.778	24	–	14	.632
Jackson State	10	–	8	.556	13	–	19	.406
Grambling State	10	–	8	.556	17	–	17	.500
Arkansas–Pine Bluff	10	–	8	.556	13	–	19	.406
Alabama State	9	–	9	.500	12	–	19	.387
Southern	6	–	12	.333	7	–	25	.219
Alcorn State	6	–	12	.333	10	–	21	.323
Mississippi Valley State	4	–	14	.222	6	–	26	.188
Alabama A&M*	4	–	14	.222	5	–	27	.156
† 2019 SWAC tournament winner *ineligible for postseason due to APR violations

The 2018–19 Alabama A&M Bulldogs basketball team represented Alabama A&M University during the 2018–19 NCAA Division I men's basketball season. The Bulldogs, led by interim head coach Dylan Howard, played their home games at the Elmore Gymnasium in Normal, Alabama as members of the Southwestern Athletic Conference.

For the second season in a row, Alabama A&M was ineligible for postseason play due to APR violations.

== Previous season ==
The Bulldogs finished the season 3–28, 3–15 in SWAC play to finish in last place. Alabama A&M was ineligible for postseason play due to APR violations.

On May 11, 2018, head coach Donnie Marsh resigned after just one season marking the second consecutive year the school's head coach had resigned following the season. Six days later, A&M associate head coach Dylan Howard was named interim head coach of the team for the 2018–19 season.

== Roster ==
2018–19 Alabama A&M Bulldogs men's basketball team
Players
Coaches

Pos.	#	Name	Height	Weight	Year	Hometown
G	0	Jalen Reeder	6 ft 5 in (1.96 m)	181 lb (82 kg)	Sr	Kissimmee, Florida
G	1	Andre Kennedy	6 ft 7 in (2.01 m)	206 lb (93 kg)	Sr	Albany, Georgia
G	2	Brandon Miller	6 ft 0 in (1.83 m)	170 lb (77 kg)	So	Huntsville, Alabama
G	3	Tre Todd	5 ft 11 in (1.8 m)	155 lb (70 kg)	Jr	Phenix City, Alabama
G	4	Daniel Sanders	6 ft 0 in (1.83 m)	162 lb (73 kg)	So	Huntsville, Alabama
G	5	Amari Gouldbourne	5 ft 9 in (1.75 m)	165 lb (75 kg)	So	Riverview, Florida
G	10	Arthur Johnson	6 ft 2 in (1.88 m)	195 lb (88 kg)	Sr	Marion, Alabama
G	11	Brandon Wright	6 ft 2 in (1.88 m)	185 lb (84 kg)	So	Birmingham, Alabama
G	12	Brandon Powell	6 ft 2 in (1.88 m)	202 lb (92 kg)	Fr	Huntsville, Alabama
F	20	Shaquille Seville	6 ft 9 in (2.06 m)	262 lb (119 kg)	RS So	Palm Bay, Florida
G	22	Gerron Scissum	6 ft 8 in (2.03 m)	210 lb (95 kg)	Jr	Huntsville, Alabama
F	24	Evan Wiley	6 ft 6 in (1.98 m)	210 lb (95 kg)	Jr	Huntsville, Alabama
F	30	Brandon Houston	6 ft 7 in (2.01 m)	267 lb (121 kg)	So	Birmingham, Alabama
G	32	Dennis Stallings, Jr.	6 ft 1 in (1.85 m)	182 lb (83 kg)	Fr	Mt. Juliet, Tennessee
F	33	Malik Lesure	6 ft 4 in (1.93 m)	195 lb (88 kg)	Fr	Memphis, Tennessee
G	34	Walter Jones, Jr.	6 ft 5 in (1.96 m)	180 lb (82 kg)	Jr	Greensboro, Alabama
F	35	Tracey Burnett	6 ft 4 in (1.93 m)	275 lb (125 kg)	Jr	Huntsville, Alabama

Head coach

- Dylan Howard (UAB)

Assistant coach(es)

- Derrick Tilmon (Hiwassee)
- Antwain Banks (IU Southeast)
- Carl Richburg (Miami (OH))

Legend

- (C) Team captain
- (S) Suspended
- (I) Ineligible
- (W) Walk-on
- Injured
- Current redshirt

Roster
Last update: September 27, 2018

== Schedule and results ==
Date time, TV	Rank^{#}	Opponent^{#}	Result	Record	High points	High rebounds	High assists	Site (attendance) city, state
Non-conference regular season
Nov 6, 2018*; 7:00 pm		at South Florida	L 63–80	0–1	20 – Johnson	5 – Reeder	8 – Miller	Yuengling Center (2,213); Tampa, FL
Nov 10, 2018*; 2:00 pm, ESPN3		at Houston; Men Against Breast Cancer Cup	L 54–101	0–2	14 – Kennedy	4 – Reeder	3 – Todd	H&PE Arena (3,725); Houston, TX
Nov 12, 2018*; 7:00 pm		at Rice; Men Against Breast Cancer Cup	L 59–73	0–3	13 – Reeder	6 – Tied	5 – Miller	Tudor Fieldhouse (1,103); Houston, TX
Nov 17, 2018*; 5:00 pm		at BYU; Men Against Breast Cancer Cup	L 60–91	0–4	18 – Wiley	9 – Kennedy	5 – Wiley	Marriott Center (12,206); Provo, UT
Nov 23, 2018*; 6:30 pm		at Northwestern State; Men Against Breast Cancer Cup	L 66–70 ^{OT}	0–5	24 – Reeder	9 – Scissum	5 – Scissum	Prather Coliseum (720); Natchitoches, LA
Nov 25, 2018*; 1:00 pm		at Fordham	L 46–77	0–6	12 – Scissum	4 – Tied	3 – Miller	Rose Hill Gymnasium (1,444); Bronx, NY
Nov 29, 2018*; 7:00 pm		vs. UAB	L 57–67	0–7	17 – Johnson	7 – Kennedy	5 – Miller	Von Braun Center (2,109); Huntsville, AL
Dec 1, 2018*; 6:00 pm		Austin Peay	L 61–73	0–8	18 – Reeder	10 – Reeder	5 – Miller	Elmore Gymnasium (774); Normal, AL
Dec 9, 2018*; 4:00 pm		Samford	L 59–77	0–9	16 – Johnson	6 – Kennedy	4 – Wright	Elmore Gymnasium (499); Normal, AL
Dec 19, 2018*; 7:00 pm		at South Alabama	L 67–79	0–10	13 – Tied	6 – Jones Jr.	6 – Miller	Mitchell Center (1,732); Mobile, AL
Dec 21, 2018*; 6:30 pm		vs. La Salle; Battle at the Boardwalk semifinals	L 57–80	0–11	17 – Scissum	9 – Scissum	2 – Tied	Boardwalk Hall; Atlantic City, NJ
Dec 22, 2018*; TBA		vs. Tulane; Battle at the Boardwalk	W 67–59	1–11	19 – Miller	9 – Scissum	7 – Miller	Boardwalk Hall; Atlantic City, NJ
Dec 29, 2018*; 10:59 pm		at Hawaii	L 63–71	1–12	18 – Todd	6 – Scissum	4 – Miller	Stan Sheriff Center (5,043); Honolulu, HI
Dec 31, 2018*; 5:00 pm		at Pepperdine	L 64–100	1–13	14 – Todd	4 – Seville	4 – Tied	Firestone Fieldhouse (725); Malibu, CA
SWAC regular season
Jan 5, 2019; 6:00 pm		Jackson State	L 51–54 ^{OT}	1–14 (0–1)	18 – Kennedy	11 – Kennedy	2 – Johnson	Elmore Gymnasium (898); Normal, AL
Jan 7, 2019; 7:30 pm		Grambling State	W 65–60	2–14 (1–1)	16 – Johnson	10 – Kennedy	4 – Miler	Elmore Gymnasium (1,124); Normal, AL
Jan 12, 2019; 4:30 pm		at Mississippi Valley State	L 63–72	2–15 (1–2)	21 – Todd	11 – Kennedy	1 – Tied	Harrison HPER Complex (1,997); Itta Bena, MS
Jan 14, 2019; 7:30 pm		at Arkansas–Pine Bluff	L 49–50	2–16 (1–3)	19 – Kennedy	9 – Tied	3 – Tied	K.L. Johnson Complex (1,624); Pine Bluff, AR
Jan 19, 2019; 5:00 pm		Alabama State	L 54–72	2–17 (1–4)	15 – Kennedy	7 – Kennedy	3 – Kennedy	Elmore Gymnasium (3,789); Normal, AL
Jan 26, 2019; 6:00 pm		Southern	W 68–62	3–17 (2–4)	26 – Kennedy	10 – Kennedy	4 – Miller	Elmore Gymnasium (430); Normal, AL
Jan 28, 2019; 7:30 pm		Alcorn State	W 71–62	4–17 (3–4)	16 – Kennedy	7 – Miller	10 – Miller	Elmore Gymnasium (487); Normal, AL
Feb 2, 2019; 5:00 pm		at Prairie View A&M	L 65–81	4–18 (3–5)	15 – Todd	12 – Scissum	4 – Miller	William J. Nicks Building (475); Prairie View, TX
Feb 4, 2019; 7:30 pm		at Texas Southern	L 74–84	4–19 (3–6)	15 – Houston	6 – Reeder	5 – Miller	H&PE Arena (752); Houston, TX
Feb 9, 2019; 6:00 pm		Mississippi Valley State	W 78-63	5-19 (4-6)	18 – Miller	6 – Reeder	7 – Miller	Elmore Gymnasium (987); Normal, AL
Feb 11, 2019; 7:30 pm		Arkansas–Pine Bluff	L 60-69	5-20 (4-7)	15 – Reeder	7 – Scissum	6 – Miller	Elmore Gymnasium; Normal, AL
Feb 16, 2019; 5:00 pm		at Alabama State	L 62-68	5-21 (4-8)	19 – Reeder	10 – Reeder	6 – Miller	Dunn–Oliver Acadome; Montgomery, AL
Feb 23, 2019; 7:30 pm		at Southern	L 49-59	5-22 (4-9)	9 – Miller	6 – Kennedy	4 – Jones Jr.	F.G. Clark Center (1,281); Baton Rouge, LA
Feb 25, 2019; 7:30 pm		at Alcorn State	L 55-61	5-23 (4-10)	17 – Kennedy	8 – Kennedy	3 – Goulbourne	Davey Whitney Complex (470); Lorman, MS
Mar 2, 2019; 6:00 pm		Prairie View A&M	L 65-72	5-24 (4-11)	26 – Kennedy	8 – Miller	3 – Kennedy	Elmore Gymnasium; Normal, AL
Mar 4, 2019; 7:30 pm		at Texas Southern	L 61-66	5-25 (4-12)	26 – Kennedy	11 – Kennedy	4 – Jones Jr.	Elmore Gymnasium (672); Normal, AL
Mar 7, 2019; 7:30 pm		at Jackson State	L 47-66	5-26 (4-13)	9 – Kennedy	5 – Kennedy	7 – Miller	Williams Assembly Center; Jackson, MS
Mar 9, 2019; 5 pm		at Grambling State	L 58-66	5-27 (4-14)	21 – Kennedy	5 – Kennedy	4 – Wright	Fredrick C. Hobdy Assembly Center (1,291); Grambling, LA
*Non-conference game. ^{#}Rankings from AP Poll. (#) Tournament seedings in parentheses. All times are in Central Time.
