= 2018–19 Mississippi Valley State Delta Devils basketball team =

American college basketball season

2018–19 Mississippi Valley State Delta Devils basketball
- Conference: Southwestern Athletic Conference
- Record: 6–26 (4–14 SWAC)
- Head coach: Andre Payne (5th season)
- Assistant coaches: Eric Strothers; Adaiah Curry; Jaquay Walls
- Home arena: Harrison HPER Complex

2018–19 SWAC men's basketball standings
	Conf.				Overall
Team	W		L	PCT	W		L	PCT
Prairie View A&M †	17	–	1	.944	22	–	13	.629
Texas Southern	14	–	4	.778	24	–	14	.632
Jackson State	10	–	8	.556	13	–	19	.406
Grambling State	10	–	8	.556	17	–	17	.500
Arkansas–Pine Bluff	10	–	8	.556	13	–	19	.406
Alabama State	9	–	9	.500	12	–	19	.387
Southern	6	–	12	.333	7	–	25	.219
Alcorn State	6	–	12	.333	10	–	21	.323
Mississippi Valley State	4	–	14	.222	6	–	26	.188
Alabama A&M*	4	–	14	.222	5	–	27	.156
† 2019 SWAC tournament winner *ineligible for postseason due to APR violations

The 2018–19 Mississippi Valley State Delta Devils basketball team represented Mississippi Valley State University in the 2018–19 NCAA Division I men's basketball season. The Delta Devils were led by fifth-year head coach Andre Payne, and played their home games at the Harrison HPER Complex in Itta Bena, Mississippi as members of the Southwestern Athletic Conference (SWAC). They finished the season 6–26 overall, 4–14 in SWAC play, to finish in a tie for ninth place. They failed to qualify for the 2019 SWAC tournament, as only the top eight teams are eligible to participate.

== Previous season ==
The Delta Devils finished the 2017–18 season 4–28, 4–14 in SWAC play, to finish in ninth place. Due to the ineligibility of Grambling State, the Delta Devils received the No. 8 seed in the SWAC tournament and lost to Arkansas–Pine Bluff in the quarterfinals.

== Roster ==
2018–19 Mississippi Valley State Delta Devils men's basketball team
Players
Coaches

Pos.	#	Name	Height	Weight	Year	Hometown
G	0	Jeffery Lewis	6 ft 5 in (1.96 m)	200 lb (91 kg)	Fr	Madison, WI
F	1	Dante Scott	6 ft 4 in (1.93 m)	220 lb (100 kg)	Jr	Miami, FL
G	3	Jordan Evans	6 ft 2 in (1.88 m)	175 lb (79 kg)	Jr	Waco, TX
G	5	Tereke Eckwood	6 ft 2 in (1.88 m)	175 lb (79 kg)	Jr	Fayetteville, AR
C	10	Emmanuel Ejeh	6 ft 8 in (2.03 m)	220 lb (100 kg)	Jr	Abuja, Nigeria
G	11	Kylan Phillips	5 ft 11 in (1.8 m)	164 lb (74 kg)	Jr	Memphis, TN
F	12	Lorenzo Hunt	6 ft 4 in (1.93 m)	186 lb (84 kg)	So	Memphis, TN
F	13	Marcus Roberts	6 ft 6 in (1.98 m)	195 lb (88 kg)	Jr	Jackson, MS
F	15	Gemaal Davis	6 ft 4 in (1.93 m)	178 lb (81 kg)	Jr	Queens, NY
F	20	Davere Creighton	6 ft 6 in (1.98 m)	263 lb (119 kg)	Jr	Brooklyn, NY
F	21	Arinze Anakwenze	6 ft 6 in (1.98 m)	195 lb (88 kg)	Fr	Los Angeles, CA
G	22	Nate Nahirny	6 ft 2 in (1.88 m)	182 lb (83 kg)	Jr	Houston, TX
F	23	LaCurtis Allen	6 ft 4 in (1.93 m)	185 lb (84 kg)	Sr	Duck Hill, MS
G	24	Henry Taylor	6 ft 4 in (1.93 m)	173 lb (78 kg)	Fr	Gary, IN
G	25	Demontavious Davis	6 ft 0 in (1.83 m)	163 lb (74 kg)	Fr	Jackson, MS
C	32	Kaleb Allison	6 ft 7 in (2.01 m)	275 lb (125 kg)	Fr	Greenville, MS
F	33	Jamal Watson	6 ft 9 in (2.06 m)	210 lb (95 kg)	Sr	Long Beach, CA

Head coach

- Andre Payne

Assistant coach(es)

- Eric Strothers
- Adaiah Curry
- Jaquay Walls

Legend

- (C) Team captain
- (S) Suspended
- (I) Ineligible
- (W) Walk-on
- Injured
- Current redshirt

Roster
Last update: June 18, 2025

== Schedule and results ==
Date time, TV	Rank^{#}	Opponent^{#}	Result	Record	Site (attendance) city, state
Exhibition
October 30, 2018*; 7:00 p.m.		Tougaloo College	L 85–87		Harrison HPER Complex (987); Itta Bena, MS
November 3, 2018*; 3:00 p.m.		Delta State	L 67–70		Harrison HPER Complex (879); Itta Bena, MS
Non-conference regular season
November 6, 2018*; 7:00 p.m., BTN+		at Nebraska; Hall of Fame Classic campus-site game	L 37–106	0–1	Pinnacle Bank Arena (15,307); Lincoln, NE
November 9, 2018*; 8:00 p.m.		at Texas Tech; Hall of Fame Classic campus-site game	L 52–84	0–2	United Supermarkets Arena (9,873); Lubbock, TX
November 13, 2018*; 8:00 p.m.		at Utah State	L 59–94	0–3	Smith Spectrum (5,133); Logan, UT
November 15, 2018*; 8:00 p.m.		at Utah	L 63–98	0–4	Jon M. Huntsman Center (10,804); Salt Lake City, UT
November 17, 2018*; 6:00 p.m.		at Robert Morris; Hall of Fame Classic campus-site game	L 59–68	0–5	North Athletic Complex (1,016); Pittsburgh, PA
November 20, 2018*; 7:00 p.m., BYUtv		Southeastern Louisiana; Hall of Fame Classic campus-site game	W 69–59	1–5	Harrison HPER Complex (188); Itta Bena, MS
November 25, 2018*; 1:00 p.m.		at Illinois	L 67–86	1–6	State Farm Center (11,706); Champaign, IL
November 28, 2018*; 7:00 p.m.		Rust	W 102–62	2–6	Harrison HPER Complex (478); Itta Bena, MS
December 1, 2018*; 9:00 p.m.		at California Baptist	L 71–107	2–7	CBU Events Center (2,742); Riverside, CA
December 4, 2018*; 7:00 p.m.		Southeast Missouri State	L 57–77	2–8	Harrison HPER Complex (978); Itta Bena, MS
December 11, 2018*; 7:30 p.m.		at Louisiana Tech	L 80–96	2–9	Thomas Assembly Center (1,816); Ruston, LA
December 13, 2018*; 9:00 p.m.		at Santa Clara	L 54–82	2–10	Leavey Center (862); Santa Clara, CA
December 16, 2018*; 10:00 p.m.		at Hawaii	L 51–76	2–11	Stan Sheriff Center (4,890); Honolulu, HI
December 22, 2018*; 7:00 p.m., ESPN3		at Grand Canyon	L 64–85	2–12	GCU Arena (7,255); Phoenix, AZ
SWAC regular season
January 5, 2019; 7:00 p.m.		at Arkansas–Pine Bluff	L 52–64	2–13 (0–1)	K. L. Johnson Complex (1,651); Pine Bluff, AR
January 12, 2019; 4:30 p.m.		Alabama A&M	W 72–63	3–13 (1–1)	Harrison HPER Complex (1,997); Itta Bena, MS
January 14, 2019; 7:30 p.m.		Alabama State	L 79–81 ^{OT}	3–14 (1–2)	Harrison HPER Complex (2,298); Itta Bena, MS
January 19, 2019; 4:30 p.m.		at Alcorn State	L 57–63	3–15 (1–3)	Davey Whitney Complex (687); Lorman, MS
January 21, 2019; 4:30 p.m.		at Southern	L 56–80	3–16 (1–4)	F. G. Clark Center (930); Baton Rouge, LA
January 26, 2019; 4:30 p.m.		Prairie View A&M	L 78–89	3–17 (1–5)	Harrison HPER Complex (3,017); Itta Bena, MS
January 28, 2019; 4:30 p.m.		Texas Southern	L 62–65	3–18 (1–6)	Harrison HPER Complex (1,229); Itta Bena, MS
February 2, 2019; 4:30 p.m.		at Jackson State	L 57–61	3–19 (1–7)	Williams Assembly Center (2,005); Jackson, MS
February 4, 2019; 7:30 p.m., ESPNU		at Grambling State	L 57–79	3–20 (1–8)	Fredrick C. Hobdy Assembly Center (1,191); Grambling, LA
February 9, 2019; 4:30 p.m.		at Alabama A&M	L 63–78	3–21 (1–9)	Elmore Gymnasium (987); Normal, AL
February 11, 2019; 7:30 p.m.		at Alabama State	L 59–82	3–22 (1–10)	Dunn–Oliver Acadome; Montgomery, AL
February 16, 2019; 4:30 p.m.		Alcorn State	W 76–68	4–22 (2–10)	Harrison HPER Complex (3,879); Itta Bena, MS
February 18, 2019; 7:30 p.m.		Southern	W 70–59	5–22 (3–10)	Harrison HPER Complex (2,298); Itta Bena, MS
February 23, 2019; 4:30 p.m.		at Prairie View A&M	L 63–69	5–23 (3–11)	William J. Nicks Building; Prairie View, TX
February 25, 2019; 4:30 p.m.		at Texas Southern	L 80–92	5–24 (3–12)	H&PE Arena (647); Houston, TX
March 2, 2019; 4:30 p.m.		Jackson State	W 60–57	6–24 (4–12)	Harrison HPER Complex (4,901); Itta Bena, MS
March 4, 2019; 7:30 p.m.		Grambling State	L 75–77	6–25 (4–13)	Harrison HPER Complex (2,187); Itta Bena, MS
March 9, 2019; 4:30 p.m.		Arkansas–Pine Bluff	L 57–91	6–26 (4–14)	Harrison HPER Complex (2,987); Itta Bena, MS
*Non-conference game. ^{#}Rankings from AP poll. (#) Tournament seedings in parentheses. All times are in Eastern.

== See also ==
- Mississippi Valley State Devilettes basketball
