= 2018–19 Alabama State Hornets basketball team =

American college basketball season

2018–19 Alabama State Hornets basketball
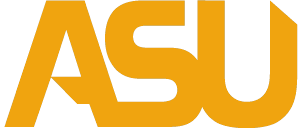
- Conference: Southwestern Athletic Conference
- Record: 12–19 (9–9 SWAC)
- Head coach: Lewis Jackson (14th season)
- Assistant coaches: Anthony Sewell; Steve Rogers; Byron Rimm
- Home arena: Dunn–Oliver Acadome

2018–19 SWAC men's basketball standings
	Conf.				Overall
Team	W		L	PCT	W		L	PCT
Prairie View A&M †	17	–	1	.944	22	–	13	.629
Texas Southern	14	–	4	.778	24	–	14	.632
Jackson State	10	–	8	.556	13	–	19	.406
Grambling State	10	–	8	.556	17	–	17	.500
Arkansas–Pine Bluff	10	–	8	.556	13	–	19	.406
Alabama State	9	–	9	.500	12	–	19	.387
Southern	6	–	12	.333	7	–	25	.219
Alcorn State	6	–	12	.333	10	–	21	.323
Mississippi Valley State	4	–	14	.222	6	–	26	.188
Alabama A&M*	4	–	14	.222	5	–	27	.156
† 2019 SWAC tournament winner *ineligible for postseason due to APR violations

The 2018–19 Alabama State Hornets basketball team represented Alabama State University during the 2018–19 NCAA Division I men's basketball season. The Hornets, led by 14th-year head coach Lewis Jackson, played their home games at the Dunn–Oliver Acadome in Montgomery, Alabama as members of the Southwestern Athletic Conference.

== Previous season ==
The Hornets finished the 2017–18 season 8–23, 8–10 in SWAC play to finish in seventh place. Due to Grambling State's ineligibility, they received the No. 6 seed in the SWAC tournament where they lost to Texas Southern in the quarterfinals.

== Roster ==
2018–19 Alabama State Hornets men's basketball team
Players
Coaches

Pos.	#	Name	Height	Weight	Year	Hometown
G	00	Azariah Seay	6 ft 4 in (1.93 m)	175 lb (79 kg)	Fr	Prattville, Alabama
F	1	Therrell Gosier II	6 ft 7 in (2.01 m)	225 lb (102 kg)	Jr	Pompano Beach, Florida
G	2	Kevin Holston	6 ft 1 in (1.85 m)	180 lb (82 kg)	RS So	Washington, D.C.
G	3	Gene Davis	6 ft 1 in (1.85 m)	180 lb (82 kg)	Sr	Birmingham, Alabama
G/F	4	Leon Daniels	6 ft 4 in (1.93 m)	175 lb (79 kg)	Jr	Atlantic City, New Jersey
G	5	Tobi Ewuosho	6 ft 5 in (1.96 m)	175 lb (79 kg)	Jr	Chicago, Illinois
G	10	Jacoby Ross	5 ft 9 in (1.75 m)	165 lb (75 kg)	So	New Orleans, Louisiana
G/F	11	Austin Rogers	6 ft 4 in (1.93 m)	180 lb (82 kg)	RS So	Montgomery, Alabama
G	12	Reginald Gee	6 ft 3 in (1.91 m)	175 lb (79 kg)	Jr	Houston, Texas
G/F	13	AJ Farrar	6 ft 5 in (1.96 m)	220 lb (100 kg)	Jr	Duluth, Georgia
F	14	Ed Jones	6 ft 8 in (2.03 m)	205 lb (93 kg)	Sr	Atlanta, Georgia
F	15	Fausto Pichardo	6 ft 8 in (2.03 m)	215 lb (98 kg)	Sr	New York, New York
G	20	John Sellars Wright	6 ft 3 in (1.91 m)	165 lb (75 kg)	Fr	Fort Lauderdale, Florida
C	24	Branden Johnson	6 ft 8 in (2.03 m)	205 lb (93 kg)	RS Jr	Garfield, Ohio

Head coach

- Lewis Jackson (Alabama State)

Assistant coach(es)

- Anthony Sewell (Troy)
- Steve Rogers (Alabama State)
- Byron Rimm (Cal State–Los Angeles)

Legend

- (C) Team captain
- (S) Suspended
- (I) Ineligible
- (W) Walk-on
- Injured
- Current redshirt

Roster
Last update: November 7, 2018

== Schedule and results ==
Date time, TV	Rank^{#}	Opponent^{#}	Result	Record	High points	High rebounds	High assists	Site (attendance) city, state
Non-conference regular season
Nov 6, 2018*; 7:00 pm		at Iowa State	L 53–79	0–1	15 – Gee	11 – Johnson	4 – Davis	Hilton Coliseum (13,696); Ames, IA
Nov 8, 2018*; 7:00 pm		at South Dakota State	L 61–78	0–2	25 – Ross	5 – Gosier	2 – Ross	Frost Arena (2,277); Brookings, SD
Nov 11, 2018*; 5:30 pm		LaGrange	W 97–63	1–2	24 – Gee	7 – Johnson	3 – Farrar	Dunn–Oliver Acadome (3,180); Montgomery, AL
Nov 14, 2018*; 7:00 pm		Birmingham–Southern	W 86–44	2–2	18 – Gee	13 – Johnson	6 – Holston	Dunn–Oliver Acadome (1,807); Montgomery, AL
Nov 21, 2018*; 7:30 pm, BTN		at No. 20 Iowa	L 78-105	2-3	16 – Gee	13 – Pichardo	5 – Tied	Carver–Hawkeye Arena (12,939); Iowa, IA
Nov 28, 2018*; 6:00 pm		at Akron	L 54-86	2-4	9 – Tied	3 – 4 Tied	3 – Tied	James A. Rhodes Arena (2,294); Akron, OH
Dec 12, 2018*; 8:00 pm		at Boise State	L 57-67	2-5	17 – Ross	8 – Ewuosho	4 – Davis	Taco Bell Arena (3,476); Boise, ID
Dec 15, 2018*; 8:00 pm		at Utah State	L 48-86	2-6	11 – Ewuosho	8 – Daniels	3 – Holston	Smith Spectrum (6,078); Logan, Utah
Dec 18, 2018*; 6:30 pm		at Sam Houston State	L 57-78	2-7	21 – Ross	6 – Johnson	3 – Ross	Bernard Johnson Coliseum (625); Huntsville, TX
Dec 21, 2018*; 11:00 pm		vs. Liberty; St. Pete Shootout semifinals	L 55-73	2-8	12 – Gee	4 – Holston	5 – Ross	MacArthur Center (158); St. Petersburg, FL
Dec 22, 2018*; 11:00 am		vs. Campbell; St. Pete Shootout	L 69-70	2-9	25 – Ross	10 – Pichardo	4 – Davis	McArthur Center (110); St. Petersburg, FL
SWAC regular season
Jan 5, 2019; 5:30 pm		Grambling State	W 74-53	3-9 (1-0)	18 – Farrar	12 – Farrar	4 – Davis	Dunn–Oliver Acadome (91); Montgomery, AL
Jan 7, 2019; 7:30 pm		Jackson State	W 59-57	4-9 (2-0)	13 – Ross	8 – Gee	2 – Ross	Dunn–Oliver Acadome (1,321); Montgomery, AL
Jan 12, 2019; 7:00 pm		at Arkansas–Pine Bluff	L 71-82	4-10 (2-1)	19 – Gee	8 – McKnight	4 – Jackson	K. L. Johnson Complex (1,655); Pine Bluff, AR
Jan 14, 2019; 7:00 pm		at Mississippi Valley State	W 81-79(OT)	5-10 (3-1)	16 – Gee	8 – Ewuosho	4 – Holson	Harrison HPER Complex (2,298); Itta Bena, MS
Jan 19, 2019; 5:00 pm		at Alabama A&M	W 72-54	6-10 (4-1)	19 – Gee	7 – Gee	3 – Daniels	Elmore Gymnasium (3,789); Huntsville, AL
Jan 26, 2019; 5:00 pm		Alcorn State	W 74-59	7-10 (5-1)	20 – Gee	8 – Ewuosho	5 – Ross	Dunn–Oliver Acadome (2,156); Montgomery, AL
Jan 28, 2019; 7:30 pm		Southern	W 69-65	8-10 (6-1)	18 – Farrar	14 – Farrar	4 – Holston	Dunn–Oliver Acadome (2,327); Montgomery, AL
Feb 2, 2019; 4:00 pm		at Texas Southern	L 59-83	8-11 (6-2)	16 – Daniels	10 – Farrar	9 – Holston	H&PE Arena (874); Houston, TX
Feb 4, 2019; 7:30 pm		at Prairie View A&M	L 67-69	8-12 (6-3)	19 – Ross	9 – Gee	3 – Holston	William J. Nicks Building (515); Prairie View, TX
Feb 9, 2019; 5:00 pm		Arkansas–Pine Bluff	L 69-75	8-13 (6-4)	12 – Ewuosho	10 – Ewuosho	4 – Holston	Dunn–Oliver Acadome (1,980); Montgomery, AL
Feb 11, 2019; 7:30 pm		Mississippi Valley State	W 82-59	9-13 (7-4)	17 – Ross	9 – Farrar	2 – Holston	Dunn–Oliver Acadome; Montgomery, AL
Feb 16, 2019; 5:00 pm		Alabama A&M	W 68-62	10-13 (8-4)	17 – Gee	7 – Gee	4 – Holston	Dunn–Oliver Acadome (5,378); Montgomery, AL
Feb 23, 2019; 5:00 pm		at Alcorn State	L 69-74 ^{OT}	10-14 (8-5)	21 – Ross	10 – Ewuosho	4 – Holston	Davey Whitney Complex (353); Lorman, MS
Feb 25, 2019; 7:30 pm		Southern	W 60-57	11-14 (9-5)	20 – Farrar	11 – Farrar	4 – Ross	F. G. Clark Center (2,681); Baton Rouge, LA
Mar 2, 2019; 5:00 pm		Texas Southern	L 68-78	11-15 (9-6)	15 – Ross	5 – Daniels	3 – Gee	Dunn–Oliver Acadome (1,908); Montgomery, AL
Mar 4, 2019; 7:30 pm		Prairie View A&M	L 69-96	11-16 (9-7)	20 – Daniels	8 – Pichardo	5 – Gee	Dunn–Oliver Acadome (2,200); Montgomery, AL
Mar 7, 2019; 7:30 pm		at Grambling State	L 66-93	11-17 (9-8)	18 – Ewuosho	5 – Ewuosho	3 – Holston	Hobdy Assembly Center (1,109); Grambling, LA
Mar 9, 2019; 5:00 pm		at Jackson State	L 70-82	11-18 (9-9)	21 – Daniels	9 – Ewuosho	2 – Ross	Williams Assembly Center (1,023); Jackson, MS
SWAC tournament
Mar 12, 2019; 8:00 pm	(3)	(6) Alabama State; Quarterfinals	W 58-49	12-18	14 – Ross	8 – Pichardo	3 – Daniels	Williams Assembly Center; Jackson, MS
Mar 15, 2019; 8:00 pm	(3)	(2) Texas Southern; Semifinals	L 66-80	12-19	24 – Daniels	13 – Daniels	4 – Holston	Bill Harris Arena; Birmingham, AL
*Non-conference game. ^{#}Rankings from AP Poll. (#) Tournament seedings in parentheses. All times are in Central.
