= 2018–19 Prairie View A&M Panthers basketball team =

American college basketball season

2018–19 Prairie View A&M Panthers basketball
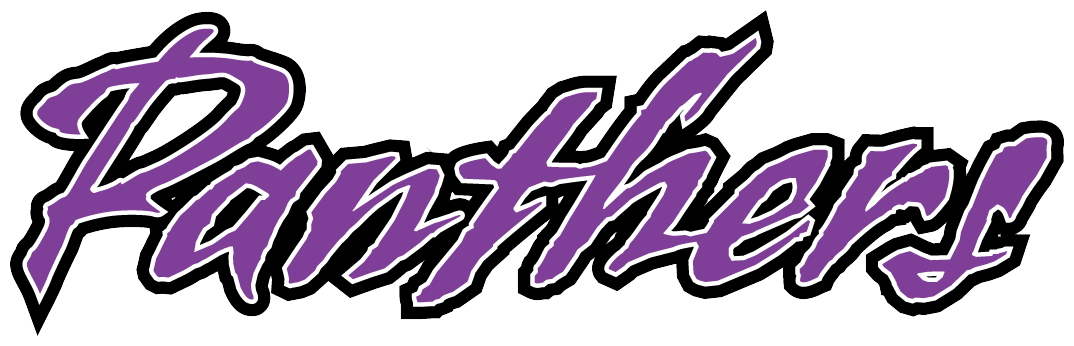

SWAC regular-season and tournament champions

NCAA tournament, First Four
- Conference: Southwestern Athletic Conference
- Record: 22–13 (17–1 SWAC)
- Head coach: Byron Smith (3rd season)
- Assistant coaches: Keenan Curry; Landon Bussie; Derrick Daniels
- Home arena: William Nicks Building

2018–19 SWAC men's basketball standings
	Conf.				Overall
Team	W		L	PCT	W		L	PCT
Prairie View A&M †	17	–	1	.944	22	–	13	.629
Texas Southern	14	–	4	.778	24	–	14	.632
Jackson State	10	–	8	.556	13	–	19	.406
Grambling State	10	–	8	.556	17	–	17	.500
Arkansas–Pine Bluff	10	–	8	.556	13	–	19	.406
Alabama State	9	–	9	.500	12	–	19	.387
Southern	6	–	12	.333	7	–	25	.219
Alcorn State	6	–	12	.333	10	–	21	.323
Mississippi Valley State	4	–	14	.222	6	–	26	.188
Alabama A&M*	4	–	14	.222	5	–	27	.156
† 2019 SWAC tournament winner *ineligible for postseason due to APR violations

The 2018–19 Prairie View A&M Panthers basketball team represented Prairie View A&M University during the 2018–19 NCAA Division I men's basketball season. The Panthers, led by third-year head coach Byron Smith, played their home games at the William Nicks Building in Prairie View, Texas as members of the Southwestern Athletic Conference (SWAC). They finished the season 22–13, 17–1 in SWAC play, to finish in first place. In the SWAC tournament, they defeated Alcorn State, Grambling State and Texas Southern to win the SWAC championship. Therefore, they received an automatic bid to the NCAA tournament as a 16th seed. However, they lost to fellow 16th seed Fairleigh Dickinson in the First Four.

== Previous season ==
The Panthers finished the 2017–18 season 16–18, 12–6 in SWAC play, to finish in a three-way tie for second place. Due to Grambling State's APR violations and subsequent postseason ineligibility, the Panthers received the No. 2 seed in the SWAC tournament. They defeated Alcorn State in the quarterfinals before losing to Texas Southern in the semifinals.

== Roster ==
2018–19 Prairie View A&M Panthers men's basketball team
Players
Coaches

Pos.	#	Name	Height	Weight	Year	Hometown
G	0	Chancellor Ellis	6 ft 4 in (1.93 m)	194 lb (88 kg)	RS Jr	Queens, NY
G	2	Darius Williams	6 ft 4 in (1.93 m)	176 lb (80 kg)	Jr	Augusta, GA
G	3	Gary Blackston	6 ft 2 in (1.88 m)	185 lb (84 kg)	Sr	Baltimore, MD
G	4	Antione Lister	6 ft 9 in (2.06 m)	165 lb (75 kg)	Jr	Brenham, TX
F	5	Kevonte Corley	6 ft 6 in (1.98 m)	175 lb (79 kg)	Jr	Nashville, TN
G	10	Tyler Singleton	6 ft 2 in (1.88 m)	185 lb (84 kg)	RS So	Dallas, TX
G	12	Elijah Holifield	6 ft 3 in (1.91 m)	180 lb (82 kg)	RS Jr	Atlanta, GA
G	13	Tyler Singleton	6 ft 2 in (1.88 m)	185 lb (84 kg)	RS So	Dallas, TX
F	13	Iwin Ellis	6 ft 7 in (2.01 m)	205 lb (93 kg)	Sr	Fort Worth, TX
G	15	Gerard Andrus	6 ft 5 in (1.96 m)	192 lb (87 kg)	Jr	Lafayette, LA
F	23	Devonte Patterson	6 ft 7 in (2.01 m)	205 lb (93 kg)	Jr	Bridgeport, TX
G	30	Juan Hood	5 ft 9 in (1.75 m)	180 lb (82 kg)	So	Magnolia, TX
G	12	Faite Williams	6 ft 3 in (1.91 m)	185 lb (84 kg)	RS Fr	Dickinson, TX
G	30	Juan Hood	5 ft 9 in (1.75 m)	180 lb (82 kg)	So	Magnolia, TX

Head coach

- Byron Smith

Assistant coach(es)

- Landon Bussie
- Jared Lyons
- Wendell Moore

Legend

- (C) Team captain
- (S) Suspended
- (I) Ineligible
- (W) Walk-on
- Injured
- Current redshirt

Roster
Last update: April 3, 2025

== Schedule and results ==
Date time, TV	Rank^{#}	Opponent^{#}	Result	Record	Site (attendance) city, state
Non-conference regular season
November 9, 2018*; 9:00 p.m.		at Santa Clara	W 81–64	1–0	Leavey Center (1,621); Santa Clara, CA
November 12, 2018*; 7:00 p.m., FSSW		at Baylor	L 80–91	1–1	Ferrell Center (4,019); Waco, TX
November 14, 2018*; 7:00 p.m.		at Texas–Rio Grande Valley; Deep South Showcase	L 57–70	1–2	UTRGV Fieldhouse (416); Edinburg, TX
November 17, 2018*; 4:00 p.m., ESPN3		at Lamar; Deep South Showcase	L 67–74	1–3	Montagne Center (1,837); Beaumont, TX
November 19, 2018*; 6:00 p.m.		at UNC Greensboro	L 66–74	1–4	Greensboro Coliseum; Greensboro, NC
November 21, 2018*; 6:00 p.m.		at East Carolina; Deep South Showcase	L 64–76	1–5	Williams Arena at Minges Coliseum (2,972); Greenville, NC
November 23, 2018*; 3:00 p.m.		at Georgia Tech; Deep South Showcase	L 54–65	1–6	Hank McCamish Pavilion (4,306); Atlanta, GA
December 1, 2018*; 1:00 p.m.		at Murray State	L 67–83	1–7	CFSB Center (3,485); Murray, KY
December 4, 2018*; 6:30 p.m.		at Louisiana Tech	L 68–82	1–8	Thomas Assembly Center (1,685); Ruston, LA
December 11, 2018*; 7:00 p.m.		at Louisiana	L 90–122	1–9	Cajundome (3,227); Lafayette, LA
December 20, 2018*		at Seattle	L 64–102	1–10	Redhawk Center (965); Seattle, WA
December 29, 2018*; 12:00 p.m., ESPN+		at Winthrop	L 62–76	1–11	Winthrop Coliseum (411); Rock Hill, SC
January 2, 2019*; 7:00 p.m.		Huston–Tillotson	W 81–65	2–11	William Nicks Building (373); Prairie View, TX
SWAC regular season
January 5, 2019; 7:00 p.m.		at Southern	W 82–73	3–11 (1–0)	F. G. Clark Center (653); Baton Rouge, LA
January 7, 2019; 8:00 p.m.		at Alcorn State	W 57–54	4–11 (2–0)	Davey Whitney Complex (613); Lorman, MS
January 12, 2019; 5:00 p.m.		Texas Southern	W 79–73	5–11 (3–0)	William Nicks Building (2,750); Prairie View, TX
January 19, 2019; 5:00 p.m.		Jackson State	W 55–51	6–11 (4–0)	William Nicks Building (815); Prairie View, TX
January 21, 2019; 7:30 p.m.		Grambling State	W 83–65	7–11 (5–0)	William Nicks Building (1,135); Prairie View, TX
January 26, 2019; 5:00 p.m.		at Mississippi Valley State	W 89–78	8–11 (6–0)	Harrison HPER Complex (3,017); Itta Bena, MS
January 28, 2019; 8:00 p.m.		at Arkansas–Pine Bluff	W 79–63	9–11 (7–0)	K. L. Johnson Complex (1,542); Pine Bluff, AR
February 2, 2019; 5:00 p.m.		Alabama A&M	W 81–65	10–11 (8–0)	William Nicks Building (475); Prairie View, TX
February 4, 2019; 7:30 p.m.		Alabama State	W 69–67	11–11 (9–0)	William Nicks Building (515); Prairie View, TX
February 9, 2019; 5:00 p.m.		at Texas Southern	L 90–95	11–12 (9–1)	Health and Physical Education Arena (6,357); Houston, TX
February 16, 2019; 5:30 p.m.		Jackson State	W 79–66	12–12 (10–1)	Williams Assembly Center (794); Jackson, MS
February 18, 2019; 7:30 p.m.		at Grambling State	W 92–87	13–12 (11–1)	Fredrick C. Hobdy Assembly Center (919); Grambling, LA
February 23, 2019; 5:00 p.m.		Mississippi Valley State	W 69–63	14–12 (12–1)	William Nicks Building; Prairie View, TX
February 25, 2019; 7:23 p.m.		Arkansas–Pine Bluff	W 48–44	15–12 (13–1)	William Nicks Building (456); Prairie View, TX
March 2, 2019; 5:00 p.m.		at Alabama A&M	W 72–65	16–12 (14–1)	Elmore Gymnasium; Normal, AL
March 4, 2019; 7:30 p.m.		at Alabama State	W 96–69	17–12 (15–1)	Dunn–Oliver Acadome (2,200); Montgomery, AL
March 7, 2019; 7:30 p.m.		Southern	W 73–55	18–12 (16–1)	William Nicks Building (685); Prairie View, TX
March 9, 2019; 5:00 p.m.		Alcorn State	W 98–64	19–12 (17–1)	William Nicks Building (665); Prairie View, TX
SWAC tournament
March 12, 2019; 7:30 p.m.	(1)	(8) Alcorn State; Quarterfinals	W 86–66	20–12	William Nicks Building (580); Prairie View, TX
March 15, 2019; 2:30 p.m., ESPN3	(1)	vs. (4) Grambling State; Semifinals	W 81–71	21–12	Bill Harris Arena; Birmingham, AL
March 16, 2019; 5:00 p.m., ESPNU	(1)	vs. (2) Texas Southern; Championship	W 92–86	22–12	Bill Harris Arena; Birmingham, AL
NCAA tournament
March 20, 2019*; 5:40 p.m., truTV	(16 W)	vs. (16 W) Fairleigh Dickinson; First Four	L 76–82	22–13	UD Arena (11,784); Dayton, OH
*Non-conference game. ^{#}Rankings from AP poll. (#) Tournament seedings in parentheses. W=West. All times are in Central.
