= 2018–19 Texas Southern Tigers basketball team =

American college basketball season

2018–19 Texas Southern Tigers basketball
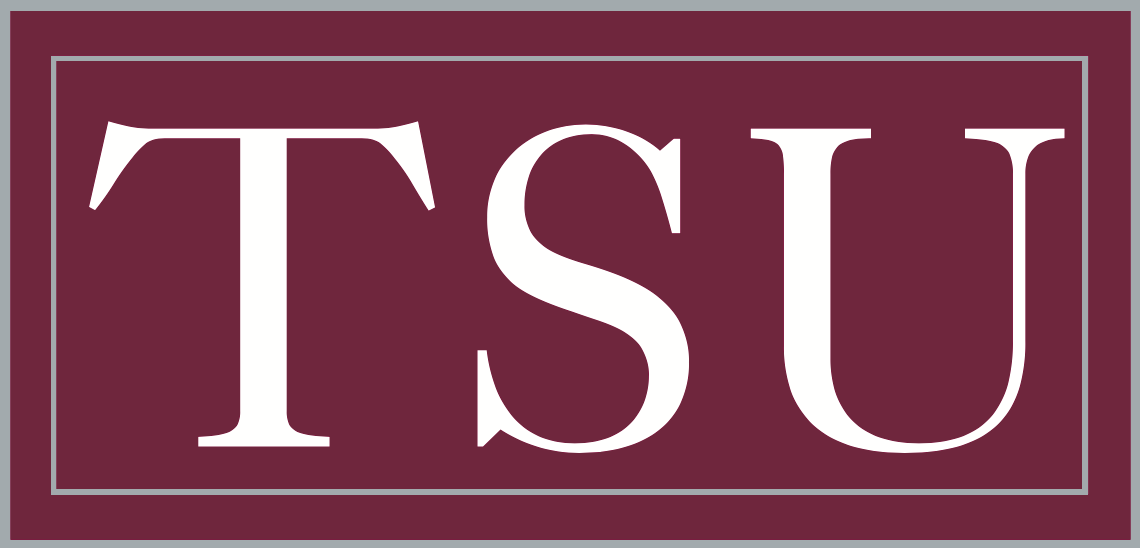

CIT, semifinals
- Conference: Southwestern Athletic Conference
- Record: 24–14 (14–4 SWAC)
- Head coach: Johnny Jones (1st season)
- Assistant coaches: Randy Peele; Kenneth Mangrum; Shyrone Chatman
- Home arena: Health and Physical Education Arena

2018–19 SWAC men's basketball standings
	Conf.				Overall
Team	W		L	PCT	W		L	PCT
Prairie View A&M †	17	–	1	.944	22	–	13	.629
Texas Southern	14	–	4	.778	24	–	14	.632
Jackson State	10	–	8	.556	13	–	19	.406
Grambling State	10	–	8	.556	17	–	17	.500
Arkansas–Pine Bluff	10	–	8	.556	13	–	19	.406
Alabama State	9	–	9	.500	12	–	19	.387
Southern	6	–	12	.333	7	–	25	.219
Alcorn State	6	–	12	.333	10	–	21	.323
Mississippi Valley State	4	–	14	.222	6	–	26	.188
Alabama A&M*	4	–	14	.222	5	–	27	.156
† 2019 SWAC tournament winner *ineligible for postseason due to APR violations

The 2018–19 Texas Southern Tigers basketball team represented Texas Southern University during the 2018–19 NCAA Division I men's basketball season. The Tigers, led by first-year head coach Johnny Jones, played their home games at the Health and Physical Education Arena in Houston, Texas as members of the Southwestern Athletic Conference (SWAC).

== Previous season ==
The Tigers finished the 2017–18 season 16–20, 12–6 in SWAC play, to finish in a three-way tie for second place. Due to Grambling State's Academic Progress Rate violations and subsequent postseason ineligibility, they received the No. 3 seed in the SWAC tournament where they defeated Alabama State, Prairie View A&M and Arkansas–Pine Bluff to become SWAC tournament champions. They received the SWAC's automatic bid to the NCAA tournament where they defeated North Carolina Central in the First Four before losing in the first round to Xavier.

On June 5, 2018, head coach Mike Davis announced he would step down as head coach to become the head coach at Detroit, which was made official on June 13. On June 25, the school hired Nevada associate head coach and former North Texas and LSU head coach Johnny Jones for the job.

== Roster ==
2018–19 Texas Southern Tigers men's basketball team
Players
Coaches

Pos.	#	Name	Height	Weight	Year	Hometown
F	0	Devocio Butler	6 ft 5 in (1.96 m)	210 lb (95 kg)	Sr	Atlanta, GA
F	1	Jeremy Combs	6 ft 7 in (2.01 m)	215 lb (98 kg)	RS Sr	Dallas, TX
F	2	Eden Ewing	6 ft 8 in (2.03 m)	225 lb (102 kg)	Sr	Richmond, TX
G	3	Jalyn Patterson	6 ft 1 in (1.85 m)	191 lb (87 kg)	RS Sr	Atlanta, GA
G	4	Derrick Bruce	6 ft 3 in (1.91 m)	175 lb (79 kg)	Sr	Moreno Valley, CA
C	5	Trayvon Reed	7 ft 2 in (2.18 m)	240 lb (109 kg)	RS Sr	Mobile, AL
G	11	Cainan McClelland	6 ft 5 in (1.96 m)	175 lb (79 kg)	RS So	Houston, TX
G	12	John Jones	6 ft 0 in (1.83 m)	165 lb (75 kg)	So	Baton Rouge, LA
F	14	Chris Baldwin	6 ft 9 in (2.06 m)	220 lb (100 kg)	Jr	Springfield, MA
F	15	Justin Hopkins	6 ft 5 in (1.96 m)	205 lb (93 kg)	RS So	Huntsville, AL
G	20	Tyrik Armstrong	5 ft 10 in (1.78 m)	170 lb (77 kg)	Jr	Houston, TX
G	23	Ashton McLelland	6 ft 1 in (1.85 m)	165 lb (75 kg)	Fr	Houston, TX
G	24	Sean Olden II	6 ft 3 in (1.91 m)	195 lb (88 kg)	RS Sr	Tulsa, OK
F	25	Kevin Granger Jr.	6 ft 5 in (1.96 m)	194 lb (88 kg)	RS So	Houston, TX
G	32	Divonte Lumpkin	6 ft 1 in (1.85 m)	175 lb (79 kg)	RS Jr	Chicago, IL
F	44	Michael Dobbins	6 ft 6 in (1.98 m)	275 lb (125 kg)	RS Fr	Compton, CA

Head coach

- Johnny Jones (LSU)

Assistant coach(es)

- Randy Peele
- Kenneth Mangrum
- Shyrone Chatman

Legend

- (C) Team captain
- (S) Suspended
- (I) Ineligible
- (W) Walk-on
- Injured
- Current redshirt

Roster
Last update: June 4, 2024

== Schedule and results ==
Date time, TV	Rank^{#}	Opponent^{#}	Result	Record	Site (attendance) city, state
Non-conference regular season
November 6, 2018*; 8:30 p.m., FSSW		at Baylor	W 72–69	1–0	Ferrell Center (4,327); Waco, TX
November 10, 2018*; 9:00 p.m., ATTSW		at No. 3 Gonzaga; Maui on the Mainland	L 67–104	1–1	McCarthey Athletic Center (6,000); Spokane, WA
November 12, 2018*; 7:00 p.m.		at Iowa State; Maui on the Mainland	L 73–85	1–2	Hilton Coliseum (13,787); Ames, IA
November 14, 2018*; 9:00 p.m.		at San Diego State; Maui on the Mainland	L 64–103	1–3	Viejas Arena (10,507); San Diego, CA
November 18, 2018*; 12:00 p.m.		at Evansville; Maui on the Mainland	L 63–85	1–4	Ford Center (4,578); Evansville, IN
November 26, 2018*; 8:00 p.m., P12N		at No. 18 Oregon	W 89–84	2–4	Matthew Knight Arena (6,926); Eugene, OR
November 29, 2018*; 7:30 p.m.		Huston–Tillotson	W 81–76	3–4	H&PE Arena (2,389); Houston, TX
December 1, 2018*; 8:30 p.m., P12N		at Arizona State	L 71–83	3–5	Wells Fargo Arena (10,085); Tempe, AZ
December 3, 2018*; 6:00 p.m., SECN		at Georgia	L 75–92	3–6	Stegeman Coliseum (6,801); Athens, GA
December 8, 2018*; 7:30 p.m.		Concordia	W 107–70	4–6	H&PE Arena (1,303); Houston, TX
December 17, 2018*; 7:00 p.m., ESPN3		at Tulane	L 70–77	4–7	Devlin Fieldhouse (1,050); New Orleans, LA
December 19, 2018*; 7:00 p.m., ESPN+		at Lamar	L 72–80	4–8	Montagne Center (1,846); Beaumont, TX
December 29, 2018*; 2:30 p.m., SECN		at Texas A&M	W 88–73	5–8	Reed Arena; College Station, TX
SWAC regular season
January 5, 2019; 5:30 p.m.		at Alcorn State	W 87–70	6–8 (1–0)	Davey Whitney Complex (306); Lorman, MS
January 7, 2019; 7:30 p.m.		at Southern	W 77–67	7–8 (2–0)	F. G. Clark Center (2,750); Baton Rouge, LA
January 12, 2019; 5:00 p.m.		at Prairie View A&M	L 73–79	7–9 (2–1)	William Nicks Building (2,750); Prairie View, TX
January 19, 2019; 7:30 p.m.		Grambling State	L 87–88	7–10 (2–2)	H&PE Arena (2,791); Houston, TX
January 21, 2019; 5:30 p.m.		Jackson State	W 75–65	8–10 (3–2)	H&PE Arena (2,227); Houston, TX
January 26, 2019; 7:30 p.m.		at Arkansas–Pine Bluff	L 86–90	8–11 (3–3)	K. L. Johnson Complex (2,478); Pine Bluff, AR
January 28, 2019; 7:30 p.m.		at Mississippi Valley State	W 65–62	9–11 (4–3)	Harrison HPER Complex (1,229); Itta Bena, MS
February 2, 2019; 7:30 p.m.		Alabama State	W 83–59	10–11 (5–3)	H&PE Arena (874); Houston, TX
February 4, 2019; 7:30 p.m.		Alabama A&M	W 84–74	11–11 (6–3)	H&PE Arena (752); Houston, TX
February 9, 2019; 7:30 p.m.		Prairie View A&M	W 95–90	12–11 (7–3)	H&PE Arena (6,357); Houston, TX
February 16, 2019; 5:00 p.m.		at Grambling State	W 86–65	13–11 (8–3)	Fredrick C. Hobdy Assembly Center (1,619); Grambling, LA
February 18, 2019; 7:30 p.m.		at Jackson State	W 77–65	14–11 (9–3)	Williams Assembly Center (952); Jackson, MS
February 23, 2019; 7:30 p.m.		Arkansas–Pine Bluff	W 94–74	15–11 (10–3)	H&PE Arena (1,582); Houston, TX
February 25, 2019; 7:30 p.m.		Mississippi Valley State	W 92–80	16–11 (11–3)	H&PE Arena (647); Houston, TX
March 2, 2019; 5:00 p.m.		at Alabama State	W 78–68	17–11 (12–3)	Dunn–Oliver Acadome (1,908); Montgomery, AL
March 4, 2019; 7:30 p.m.		at Alabama A&M	W 66–61	18–11 (13–3)	Elmore Gymnasium (672); Normal, AL
March 7, 2019; 7:30 p.m.		Alcorn State	W 99–72	19–11 (14–3)	H&PE Arena (849); Houston, TX
March 9, 2019; 7:30 p.m.		Southern	L 77–87	19–12 (14–4)	H&PE Arena (1,261); Houston, TX
SWAC tournament
March 12, 2019; 7:30 p.m.	(2)	(7) Southern; Quarterfinals	W 80–70	20–12	H&PE Arena (1,463); Houston, TX
March 15, 2019; 8:30 p.m., ESPN3	(2)	vs. (6) Alabama State; Semifinals	W 80–66	21–12	Bill Harris Arena (1,276); Birmingham, AL
March 16, 2019; 5:00 p.m., ESPNU	(2)	vs. (1) Prairie View A&M; Championship game	L 86–92	21–13	Bill Harris Arena; Birmingham, AL
CollegeInsider.com Postseason Tournament
March 20, 2019*; 7:00 p.m.		at New Orleans; First round	W 95–89 ^{OT}	22–13	Lakefront Arena (612); New Orleans, LA
March 25, 2019*; 7:00 p.m.		at UTRGV; Second round	W 94–85	23–13	UTRGV Fieldhouse (2,216); Edinburg, TX
March 28, 2019*; 7:00 p.m.		at Louisiana–Monroe; Quarterfinals	W 108–102 ^{3OT}	24–13	Fant–Ewing Coliseum (6,004); Monroe, LA
Apr 2, 2019*; 7:00 p.m.		at Green Bay; Semifinals	L 86–87 ^{OT}	24–14	Kress Events Center (2,269); Green Bay, WI
*Non-conference game. ^{#}Rankings from AP poll. (#) Tournament seedings in parentheses. All times are in Central Time.
