= 2018–19 Grambling State Tigers men's basketball team =

American college basketball season

2018–19 Grambling State Tigers men's basketball

CIT, first round
- Conference: Southwestern Athletic Conference
- Record: 17–17 (10–8 SWAC)
- Head coach: Donte Jackson (2nd season)
- Assistant coaches: Winston Hines; Demetrius Moore; Kyle Jones
- Home arena: Fredrick C. Hobdy Assembly Center

2018–19 SWAC men's basketball standings
	Conf.				Overall
Team	W		L	PCT	W		L	PCT
Prairie View A&M †	17	–	1	.944	22	–	13	.629
Texas Southern	14	–	4	.778	24	–	14	.632
Jackson State	10	–	8	.556	13	–	19	.406
Grambling State	10	–	8	.556	17	–	17	.500
Arkansas–Pine Bluff	10	–	8	.556	13	–	19	.406
Alabama State	9	–	9	.500	12	–	19	.387
Southern	6	–	12	.333	7	–	25	.219
Alcorn State	6	–	12	.333	10	–	21	.323
Mississippi Valley State	4	–	14	.222	6	–	26	.188
Alabama A&M*	4	–	14	.222	5	–	27	.156
† 2019 SWAC tournament winner *ineligible for postseason due to APR violations

The 2018–19 Grambling State Tigers men's basketball team represented Grambling State University during the 2018–19 NCAA Division I men's basketball season. The Tigers, led by second-year head coach Donte Jackson, played their home games at the Fredrick C. Hobdy Assembly Center in Grambling, Louisiana as members of the Southwestern Athletic Conference (SWAC).

The Tigers finished the 2018–19 season 17–17 overall, 10–8 in SWAC play, to finish in three-way tie for third place. In the SWAC tournament, they defeated Arkansas–Pine Bluff in the quarterfinals before losing to Prairie View A&M in the semifinals. They were invited to the CIT, which was their first postseason tournament since being invited to the NIT in 1980. where they lost to Texas–Rio Grande Valley in the first round.

== Previous season ==
The Tigers finished the 2017–18 season 17–14, 13–5 in SWAC play. However, the Tigers were ineligible for postseason play due to APR violations.

== Roster ==
2018–19 Grambling State Tigers men's basketball team
Players
Coaches

Pos.	#	Name	Height	Weight	Year	Hometown
G	0	Shaq Athie	6 ft 4 in (1.93 m)	185 lb (84 kg)	Jr	Cincinnati, OH
G	1	Ivy Jr. Smith	6 ft 0 in (1.83 m)	160 lb (73 kg)	So	Tacoma, WA
G	2	Nigel Ribeiro	6 ft 0 in (1.83 m)	170 lb (77 kg)	Jr	Chesapeake, VA
G	3	Kareem Wright	6 ft 3 in (1.91 m)	180 lb (82 kg)	So	Nashville, TN
G	4	Anthony Gaston	6 ft 5 in (1.96 m)	190 lb (86 kg)	So	Richmond, VA
G	5	Shirmane Thomas	6 ft 3 in (1.91 m)	195 lb (88 kg)	Sr	Homer, LA
G	10	Drake Wilks	6 ft 0 in (1.83 m)	175 lb (79 kg)	Sr	Baltimore, MD
F	11	Axel Mpoyo	6 ft 8 in (2.03 m)	215 lb (98 kg)	Jr	Meridian, ID
G/F	12	Bobby Jackson	6 ft 6 in (1.98 m)	185 lb (84 kg)	Jr	Atlanta, GA
G	20	Charles Simmons	6 ft 5 in (1.96 m)	175 lb (79 kg)	So	Ahoskie, NC
F	21	Zavier Peart	6 ft 10 in (2.08 m)	250 lb (113 kg)	Sr	Miami, FL
G	22	Prince Moss	6 ft 6 in (1.98 m)	180 lb (82 kg)	So	Bessemer, AL
G	23	Marcel Thompson	6 ft 3 in (1.91 m)	190 lb (86 kg)	Fr	Baltimore, MD
G/F	23	Diing Diing Wol	6 ft 8 in (2.03 m)	220 lb (100 kg)	Jr	Baytown, TX
G/F	24	Diontae Jones	6 ft 6 in (1.98 m)	215 lb (98 kg)	Sr	Las Vegas, NV
F	32	Devante Jackson	6 ft 9 in (2.06 m)	200 lb (91 kg)	So	Milwaukee, WI
F	33	Jason Perry-Murray	6 ft 9 in (2.06 m)	220 lb (100 kg)	Fr	Harlem, NY
G	34	Lasani Johnson	6 ft 3 in (1.91 m)	180 lb (82 kg)	Jr	Dallas, TX
C	40	Travon Bunch	7 ft 0 in (2.13 m)	230 lb (104 kg)	So	Racine, WI

Head coach

- Donte Jackson (Central State)

Assistant coach(es)

- Winston Hines (Stillman)
- Demetrius Moore (Stillman)
- Kyle Jones (Arkansas–Pine Bluff)

Legend

- (C) Team captain
- (S) Suspended
- (I) Ineligible
- (W) Walk-on
- Injured
- Current redshirt

Roster
Last update: April 24, 2025

== Schedule and results ==
Date time, TV	Rank^{#}	Opponent^{#}	Result	Record	Site (attendance) city, state
Non-conference regular season
November 9, 2018*; 7:30 p.m.		Jarvis Christian	W 105–68	1–0	Fredrick C. Hobdy Assembly Center (994); Grambling, LA
November 14, 2018*; 7:30 p.m.		at Wyoming; Fort Myers Tip-Off Classic opening games	L 78–86	1–1	Arena-Auditorium (3,374); Laramie, WY
November 16, 2018*; 7:00 p.m., ESPN Plus		at Loyola–Chicago; Fort Myers Tip-Off Classic opening games	L 64–80	1–2	Joseph J. Gentile Arena (3,102); Chicago, IL
November 20, 2018*; 7:30 p.m.		Champion Christian	W 99–58	2–2	Fredrick C. Hobdy Assembly Center (1,619); Grambling, LA
November 23, 2018*; 4:05 p.m.		vs. Niagara; Fort Myers Tip-Off Regional semifinals	W 74–68	3–2	Gallagher Center (910); Lewiston, NY
November 24, 2018*; 3:00 p.m.		vs. IUPUI; Fort Myers Tip-Off Regional finals	L 69–80	3–3	Gallagher Center (635); Lewiston, NY
December 1, 2018*; 4:00 p.m., SEC Network Plus		at LSU	L 57–78	3–4	Pete Maravich Assembly Center (8,474); Baton Rouge, LA
December 4, 2018*; 7:30 p.m.		Centenary (LA)	W 81–57	4–4	Fredrick C. Hobdy Assembly Center (621); Grambling, LA
December 8, 2018*; 12:00 p.m., ESPN3		at UCF	L 45–70	4–5	CFE Arena (3,798); Orlando, FL
December 11, 2018*; 7:30 p.m.		at Louisiana-Monroe	L 67–72	4–6	Fant–Ewing Coliseum (1,601); Monroe, LA
December 15, 2018*; 9:00 p.m.		at Portland	W 70–58	5–6	Chiles Center (1,410); Portland, OR
December 19, 2018*; 7:30 p.m.		Southeastern Louisiana	W 69–68	6–6	Fredrick C. Hobdy Assembly Center (119); Grambling, LA
December 22, 2018*; 7:30 p.m., BTN		at No. 16 Wisconsin	L 53–84	6–7	Kohl Center (17,183); Madison, WI
SWAC regular season
January 5, 2019; 7:30 p.m.		at Alabama State	L 53–74	6–8 (0–1)	Dunn–Oliver Acadome; Montgomery, AL
January 7, 2019; 7:30 p.m.		at Alabama A&M	L 60–65	6–9 (0–2)	Elmore Gymnasium (1,124); Normal, AL
January 12, 2019; 5:00 p.m.		Southern	W 69–63	7–9 (1–2)	Fredrick C. Hobdy Assembly Center (1,641); Grambling, LA
January 14, 2019; 7:30 p.m.		Alcorn State	W 77–42	8–9 (2–2)	Fredrick C. Hobdy Assembly Center (1,239); Grambling, LA
January 19, 2019; 5:00 p.m.		at Texas Southern	W 88–87 ^{OT}	9–9 (3–2)	Health and Physical Education Arena (2,791); Houston, TX
January 21, 2019; 7:30 p.m.		at Prairie View A&M	L 63–88	9–10 (3–3)	William Nicks Building (1,135); Prairie View, TX
January 26, 2019; 5:00 p.m.		Jackson State	L 63–65	9–11 (3–4)	Fredrick C. Hobdy Assembly Center (1,298); Grambling, LA
February 2, 2019; 5:00 p.m.		Arkansas–Pine Bluff	W 79–55	10–11 (4–4)	Fredrick C. Hobdy Assembly Center (1,091); Grambling, LA
February 4, 2019; 7:30 p.m.		Mississippi Valley State	W 79–57	11–11 (5–4)	Fredrick C. Hobdy Assembly Center (1,191); Grambling, LA
February 9, 2019; 5:00 p.m.		at Southern	W 59–40	12–11 (6–4)	F. G. Clark Center (10,406); Baton Rouge, LA
February 11, 2019; 7:30 p.m.		at Alcorn State	W 65–53	13–11 (7–4)	Davey Whitney Complex (523); Lorman, MS
February 16, 2019; 5:00 p.m.		Texas Southern	L 85–86	13–12 (7–5)	Fredrick C. Hobdy Assembly Center (1,619); Grambling, LA
February 18, 2019; 7:30 p.m.		Prairie View A&M	L 87–92	13–13 (7–6)	Fredrick C. Hobdy Assembly Center (919); Grambling, LA
February 23, 2019; 5:00 p.m.		at Jackson State	L 60–71	13–14 (7–7)	Williams Assembly Center (1,023); Jackson, MS
March 2, 2019; 5:00 p.m.		at Arkansas–Pine Bluff	L 66–70	13–15 (7–8)	K. L. Johnson Complex (2,412); Pine Bluff, AR
March 4, 2019; 7:30 p.m.		at Mississippi Valley State	W 77–75	14–15 (8–8)	Harrison HPER Complex (2,187); Itta Bena, MS
March 7, 2019; 7:30 p.m.		Alabama State	W 93–66	15–15 (9–8)	Fredrick C. Hobdy Assembly Center (1,109); Grambling, LA
March 9, 2019; 5:00 p.m.		Alabama A&M	W 66–58	16–15 (10–8)	Fredrick C. Hobdy Assembly Center (1,291); Grambling, LA
SWAC tournament
March 12, 2019; 7:30 p.m.	(4)	(5) Arkansas–Pine Bluff; Quarterfinal	W 59–52	17–15	Fredrick C. Hobdy Assembly Center; Grambling, LA
March 15, 2019; 2:30 p.m., ESPN3	(4)	vs. (1) Prairie View A&M; Semifinal	L 71–81	17–16	Bill Harris Arena; Birmingham, AL
CollegeInsider.com Postseason Tournament
March 20, 2019*; 7:00 p.m., CBS Sports Live		at UTRGV; First round	L 73–74	17–17	UTRGV Fieldhouse (2,071); Edinburg, TX
*Non-conference game. ^{#}Rankings from AP poll. (#) Tournament seedings in parentheses. All times are in Central.
