= 2018–19 Alcorn State Braves basketball team =

American college basketball season

2018–19 Alcorn State Braves basketball
- Conference: Southwestern Athletic Conference
- Record: 10–21 (6–12 SWAC)
- Head coach: Montez Robinson (4th season)
- Assistant coaches: Derek Thompson; Delvin Thompson; Evans Davis
- Home arena: Davey Whitney Complex

2018–19 SWAC men's basketball standings
	Conf.				Overall
Team	W		L	PCT	W		L	PCT
Prairie View A&M †	17	–	1	.944	22	–	13	.629
Texas Southern	14	–	4	.778	24	–	14	.632
Jackson State	10	–	8	.556	13	–	19	.406
Grambling State	10	–	8	.556	17	–	17	.500
Arkansas–Pine Bluff	10	–	8	.556	13	–	19	.406
Alabama State	9	–	9	.500	12	–	19	.387
Southern	6	–	12	.333	7	–	25	.219
Alcorn State	6	–	12	.333	10	–	21	.323
Mississippi Valley State	4	–	14	.222	6	–	26	.188
Alabama A&M*	4	–	14	.222	5	–	27	.156
† 2019 SWAC tournament winner *ineligible for postseason due to APR violations

The 2018–19 Alcorn State Braves basketball team represented Alcorn State University during the 2018–19 NCAA Division I men's basketball season. The Braves, led by fourth-year head coach Montez Robinson, played their home games at the Davey Whitney Complex in Lorman, Mississippi, as members of the Southwestern Athletic Conference (SWAC).

== Previous season ==
The Braves finished the 2017–18 season, 11–21, 7–11 in SWAC play, to finish in eighth place. Due to Grambling State's ineligibility, they received the No. 7 seed in the SWAC tournament, where they lost in the quarterfinals to Prairie View A&M.

== Roster ==
2018–19 Alcorn State Braves men's basketball team
Players
Coaches

Pos.	#	Name	Height	Weight	Year	Hometown
G	0	Troymain Crosby	6 ft 4 in (1.93 m)	180 lb (82 kg)	So	Laurel, MS
F	1	Harold Givens	6 ft 7 in (2.01 m)	200 lb (91 kg)	RS Jr	Atlanta, GA
G	2	Jael Scott	6 ft 4 in (1.93 m)	195 lb (88 kg)	So	Charlotte, NC
G	3	Jonathan Floyd	5 ft 10 in (1.78 m)	155 lb (70 kg)	Jr	Gulfport, MS
G	5	Khari Jabriel Allen	6 ft 4 in (1.93 m)	180 lb (82 kg)	RS Jr	Muncie, IN
F	10	Kobe Wilson	6 ft 9 in (2.06 m)	220 lb (100 kg)	RS So	Kennesaw, GA
G	11	Maurice Howard	6 ft 1 in (1.85 m)	190 lb (86 kg)	Jr	Quincy, FL
F	12	Deshaw Andrews	6 ft 4 in (1.93 m)	240 lb (109 kg)	Jr	York, SC
F	13	Noah Plain	6 ft 8 in (2.03 m)	200 lb (91 kg)	RS So	Baton Rouge, LA
F	23	TyQuaylon Smith	6 ft 8 in (2.03 m)	200 lb (91 kg)	Sr	Jackson, LA
F	24	Reginal Johnson	6 ft 5 in (1.96 m)	250 lb (113 kg)	RS Sr	Monroe, LA
F	33	Devon Brewer	6 ft 8 in (2.03 m)	260 lb (118 kg)	Jr	Hiram, GA
C	40	Alonzo Campbell	7 ft 0 in (2.13 m)	235 lb (107 kg)	Jr	Portland, OR

Head coach

- Montez Robinson (North Georgia)

Assistant coach(es)

- Derek Thompson (Morris Brown)
- Delvin Thompson (Alcorn State)
- Evans Davis (Mercer)

Legend

- (C) Team captain
- (S) Suspended
- (I) Ineligible
- (W) Walk-on
- Injured
- Current redshirt

Roster
Last update: August 23, 2024

== Schedule and results ==
Date time, TV	Rank^{#}	Opponent^{#}	Result	Record	Site (attendance) city, state
Non-conference regular season
November 6, 2018*; 7:00 p.m., ESPN3		at Tulsa	L 56–73	0–1	Reynolds Center (3,128); Tulsa, OK
November 9, 2018*; 7:00 p.m.		Blue Mountain	W 79–55	1–1	Davey Whitney Complex (852); Lorman, MS
November 16, 2018*; 7:00 p.m., SECN Plus/WatchESPN		at Vanderbilt; Commodore Classic	L 54–79	1–2	Memorial Gymnasium (9,193); Nashville, TN
November 18, 2018*; 4:00 p.m., WatchESPN		at Kent State; Commodore Classic	L 48–79	1–3	MAC Center (2,031); Kent, OH
November 23, 2018*; 1:00 p.m., ESPN3		at Liberty; Commodore Classic	L 54–76	1–4	Vines Center (1,929); Lynchburg, VA
November 24, 2018*; 1:00 p.m.		vs. Savannah State; Commodore Classic	L 75–80	1–5	Vines Center (50); Lynchburg, VA
November 26, 2018*; 7:00 p.m., SECN		at No. 25 Mississippi State	L 65–88	1–6	Humphrey Coliseum (6,537); Starkville, MS
December 1, 2018*; 11:00 a.m.		Rust College	W 103–66	2–6	Davey Whitney Complex (1,607); Lorman, MS
December 8, 2018*; 4:30 p.m.		Champion Christian	W 109–45	3–6	Davey Whitney Complex (89); Lorman, MS
December 9, 2018*; 3:00 p.m.		Fisk	W 75–45	4–6	Davey Whitney Complex (108); Lorman, MS
December 18, 2018*; 3:00 p.m.		at UAB	L 49–76	4–7	Bartow Arena (2,299); Birmingham, AL
December 21, 2018*; 6:00 p.m.		at South Florida	L 44–83	4–8	Yuengling Center (2,329); Tampa, FL
SWAC regular season
January 5, 2019; 5:30 p.m., Braves All-Access		Texas Southern	L 70–87	4–9 (0–1)	Davey Whitney Complex (306); Lorman, MS
January 7, 2019; 7:30 p.m., Braves All-Access		Prairie View A&M	L 54–57	4–10 (0–2)	Davey Whitney Complex (613); Lorman, MS
January 12, 2019; 5:00 p.m.		at Jackson State	L 52–59	4–11 (0–3)	Williams Assembly Center (1,902); Jackson, MS
January 14, 2019; 7:30 p.m.		at Grambling State	L 42–77	4–12 (0–4)	Fredrick C. Hobdy Assembly Center (1,239); Grambling, LA
January 19, 2019; 5:30 p.m., Braves All-Access		Mississippi Valley State	W 63–57	5–12 (1–4)	Davey Whitney Complex (687); Lorman, MS
January 21, 2019; 7:30 p.m., Braves All-Access		Arkansas–Pine Bluff	W 74–69	6–12 (2–4)	Davey Whitney Complex (546); Lorman, MS
January 26, 2019; 5:00 p.m.		at Alabama State	L 59-74	6-13 (2-5)	Dunn–Oliver Acadome (2,156); Montgomery, AL
January 28, 2019; 7:30 p.m.		at Alabama A&M	L 62-71	6-14 (2-6)	Elmore Gymnasium (458); Normal, AL
February 2, 2019; 5:30 p.m., Braves All-Access		Southern	W 76-64	7-14 (3-6)	Davey Whitney Complex (1,054); Lorman, MS
February 9, 2019; 5:30 p.m., Braves All-Access		Jackson State	W 66-52	8-14 (4-6)	Davey Whitney Complex (1,151); Lorman, MS
February 11, 2019; 7:30 p.m., Braves All-Access		Grambling State	L 53-65	8-15 (4-7)	Davey Whitney Complex (523); Lorman, MS
February 16, 2019; 5:00 p.m.		at Mississippi Valley State	L 68-76	8-16 (4-8)	Harrison HPER Complex (3,879); Itta Bena, MS
February 18, 2019; 7:30 p.m., ESPNU		at Arkansas–Pine Bluff	L 62-73	8-17 (4-9)	K. L. Johnson Complex (3,655); Pine Bluff, AR
February 23, 2019; 5:30 p.m., Braves All-Access		Alabama State	W 74-69 ^{OT}	9-17 (5-9)	Davey Whitney Complex (353); Lorman, MS
February 25, 2019; 7:30 p.m., Braves All-Access		Alabama A&M	W 61-55	10-17 (6-9)	Davey Whitney Complex (470); Lorman, MS
March 2, 2019; 5:30 p.m.		at Southern	L 46-61	10-18 (6-10)	F. G. Clark Center (1,906); Baton Rouge, LA
March 7, 2019; 7:30 p.m.		at Texas Southern	L 72-99	10-19 (6-11)	H&PE Arena (849); Houston, TX
March 9, 2019; 5:00 p.m.		at Prairie View A&M	L 64-98	10-20 (6-12)	William Nicks Building (665); Prairie View, TX
SWAC tournament
March 12, 2019; 8:00 p.m.	(8)	(1) Prairie View A&M; Quarterfinals	L 66–86	10–21	William Nicks Building (580); Prairie View, TX
*Non-conference game. ^{#}Rankings from AP poll. (#) Tournament seedings in parentheses. All times are in Central.
