= 2018–19 Arkansas–Pine Bluff Golden Lions men's basketball team =

American college basketball season

2018–19 Arkansas–Pine Bluff Golden Lions men's basketball
- Conference: Southwestern Athletic Conference
- Record: 13–19 (10–8 SWAC)
- Head coach: George Ivory (11th season)
- Assistant coaches: Kenneth Broyles; Jarvis Gunter; Richard "Dell" Cannon
- Home arena: K. L. Johnson Complex

2018–19 SWAC men's basketball standings
| | Conf. | | | | Overall |
| Team | W | | L | PCT | W | | L | PCT |
|---|---|---|---|---|---|---|---|---|
| Prairie View A&M † | 17 | – | 1 | .944 | 22 | – | 13 | .629 |
| Texas Southern | 14 | – | 4 | .778 | 24 | – | 14 | .632 |
| Jackson State | 10 | – | 8 | .556 | 13 | – | 19 | .406 |
| Grambling State | 10 | – | 8 | .556 | 17 | – | 17 | .500 |
| Arkansas–Pine Bluff | 10 | – | 8 | .556 | 13 | – | 19 | .406 |
| Alabama State | 9 | – | 9 | .500 | 12 | – | 19 | .387 |
| Southern | 6 | – | 12 | .333 | 7 | – | 25 | .219 |
| Alcorn State | 6 | – | 12 | .333 | 10 | – | 21 | .323 |
| Mississippi Valley State | 4 | – | 14 | .222 | 6 | – | 26 | .188 |
| Alabama A&M* | 4 | – | 14 | .222 | 5 | – | 27 | .156 |
† 2019 SWAC tournament winner *ineligible for postseason due to APR violations

The 2018–19 Arkansas–Pine Bluff Golden Lions men's basketball team represented the University of Arkansas at Pine Bluff during the 2018–19 NCAA Division I men's basketball season. The Golden Lions, led by 11th-year head coach George Ivory, played their home games at the K. L. Johnson Complex as members of the Southwestern Athletic Conference.

The Golden Lions lost to Grambling State in the quarterfinals of the SWAC tournament.

== Previous season ==
The Golden Lions finished the 2017–18 season 14–21, 12–6 in SWAC play to finish in a three-way tie for second place. Due to Grambling State's Academic Progress Rate violations and subsequent postseason ineligibility, the Golden Lions received the No. 1 seed in the SWAC tournament. They defeated Mississippi Valley State and Southern before losing to Texas Southern in the tournament championship.

== Roster ==
2018–19 Arkansas–Pine Bluff Golden Lions men's basketball team
Players
Coaches

| Pos. | # | Name | Height | Weight | Year | Hometown |
|---|---|---|---|---|---|---|
| F | 00 | Dwain Whitfield | 6 ft 6 in (1.98 m) | 205 lb (93 kg) | Jr | Forrest City, Arkansas |
| G/F | 1 | Charles Jackson | 6 ft 5 in (1.96 m) | 210 lb (95 kg) | Jr | Cleveland, Mississippi |
| G | 3 | Kennedy McKinney | 6 ft 3 in (1.91 m) | 170 lb (77 kg) | Sr | Memphis, Tennessee |
| G | 10 | Quamauri Hardy | 6 ft 3 in (1.91 m) | 180 lb (82 kg) | Fr | Hoover, Alabama |
| F | 12 | Terrance Banyard | 6 ft 8 in (2.03 m) | 215 lb (98 kg) | Fr | Milwaukee, Wisconsin |
| G | 13 | Joe'Randle Toliver | 6 ft 4 in (1.93 m) | 180 lb (82 kg) | Sr | Jonesboro, Arkansas |
| G | 14 | Marcus Wallace | 6 ft 1 in (1.85 m) | 180 lb (82 kg) | Jr | Jackson, Mississippi |
| F | 15 | Trent Steen | 6 ft 8 in (2.03 m) | 225 lb (102 kg) | Sr | Forrest City, Arkansas |
| G | 22 | Khalid Campbell | 6 ft 1 in (1.85 m) | 175 lb (79 kg) | So | Greenwood, Mississippi |
| G | 23 | Martaveous McKnight | 6 ft 4 in (1.93 m) | 190 lb (86 kg) | Jr | Walls, Mississippi |
| G | 25 | Christian Robertson | 6 ft 4 in (1.93 m) | — | Jr | Monticello, Arkansas |
| G | 30 | Cameron Posey | 6 ft 2 in (1.88 m) | 180 lb (82 kg) | Fr | Milwaukee, Wisconsin |
| F | 34 | Chris Smith | 6 ft 8 in (2.03 m) | 225 lb (102 kg) | Jr | Memphis, Tennessee |
| F | 35 | Travon Harper | 6 ft 7 in (2.01 m) | 200 lb (91 kg) | Sr | McNeil, Arkansas |
| G | 40 | J'Breun Sprinkle | 6 ft 2 in (1.88 m) | 175 lb (79 kg) | RS So | White Hall, Arkansas |
| G | 44 | William Ridgell | 5 ft 9 in (1.75 m) | 165 lb (75 kg) | Fr | White Hall, Arkansas |
| G | 50 | Jordan McNair | 5 ft 8 in (1.73 m) | 160 lb (73 kg) | So | Jacksonville, Arkansas |
| F/C | 52 | David Tillman | 6 ft 10 in (2.08 m) | 225 lb (102 kg) | RS Sr | Houston, Texas |
| G | | Anthony Davis Jr. | 5 ft 9 in (1.75 m) | 165 lb (75 kg) | Fr | Shaw, Mississippi |
| F | | Isiah Solomon | 6 ft 5 in (1.96 m) | 175 lb (79 kg) | Fr | Pine Bluff, Arkansas |

Head coach

- George Ivory (Mississippi Valley State)

Assistant coach(es)

- Kenneth Broyles
- Jarvis Gunter (Arkansas–Pine Bluff)
- Richard Cannon (Mississippi Valley State)

Legend

- (C) Team captain
- (S) Suspended
- (I) Ineligible
- (W) Walk-on
- Injured
- Current redshirt

Roster
Last update: November 25, 2018

== Schedule and results ==
| Date time, TV | Rank^{#} | Opponent^{#} | Result | Record | High points | High rebounds | High assists | Site (attendance) city, state |
Non-conference regular season
| Nov 6, 2018*; 9:00 pm | | at San Diego State | L 60-76 | 0-1 | 29 – McKnight | 8 – McKnight | 3 – Jackson | Viejas Arena (11,077); San Diego, CA |
| Nov 10, 2018*; 3:00 pm | | at Colorado State | L 67-92 | 0-2 | 41 – McKnight | 6 – McKnight | 3 – Hardy | Moby Arena (2,208); Fort Collins, CO |
| Nov 17, 2018*; 7:00 pm, ESPN3 | | at Southern Illinois; Las Vegas Holiday Invitational | L 48-78 | 0-3 | 11 – McKnight | 7 – Banks/Carter | 2 – McKnight | SIU Arena (4,003); Carbondale, IL |
| Nov 19, 2018*; 6:00 pm, ESPN+ | | at UMass; Las Vegas Holiday Invitational | L 60-92 | 0-4 | 27 – McKnight | 5 – Jackson | 4 – Doss/McKnight | William D. Mullins Memorial Center (2,034); Amherst, MA |
| Nov 23, 2018*; 1:00 pm | | vs. California Baptist; Las Vegas Holiday Invitational regional semifinals | W 115-107 ^{OT} | 1-4 | 40 – McKnight | 22 – Banyard | 4 – McKnight | Jack Stephens Center; Little Rock, AR |
| Nov 24, 2018*; 3:30 pm | | vs. Little Rock; Las Vegas Holiday Invitational regional finals | W 75-66 | 2-4 | 21 – Jackson | 6 – Jackson | 8 – McKnight | Jack Stephens Center; Little Rock, AR |
| Nov 27, 2018*; 6:00 pm, ESPN3 | | at Cincinnati | L 49-105 | 2-5 | 8 – 3 Tied | 5 – Doss | 3 – Hardy | Fifth Third Arena (8,513); Cincinnati, OH |
| Dec 5, 2018*; 6:30 pm | | at No. 13 Texas Tech | L 47-65 | 2-6 | 27 – McKnight | 6 – Tied | 2 – Doss | United Supermarkets Arena (9,503); Lubbock, TX |
| Dec 8, 2018*; 7:00 pm | | at UC Santa Barbara | L 45-55 | 2-7 | 22 – McKnight | 5 – Doss | 2 – Wallace | The Thunderdome (1,582); Santa Barbara, CA |
| Dec 10, 2018* | | Champion Christian College | W 84-51 | 3-7 | 18 – McKnight | 10 – McKnight | 8 – McKnight | K. L. Johnson Complex (2,259); Pine Bluff, AR |
| Dec 20, 2018*; 7:00 pm | | at North Texas | L 66-77 | 3-8 | 24 – McKnight | 7 – McKnight | 3 – Doss | The Super Pit (2,351); Denton, TX |
| Dec 22, 2018*; 1:00 pm, ESPN+ | | at Missouri State | L 72-93 | 3-9 | 23 – Doss | 8 – Banyard | 2 – Doss | JQH Arena (3,826); Springfield, MO |
| Dec 29, 2018*; 12:00 pm | | at Troy | L 63-71 | 3-10 | 22 – McKnight | 6 – Banyard | 22 – McKnight | Trojan Arena (436); Troy, AL |
SWAC regular season
| Jan 5, 2019; 7:30 pm | | Mississippi Valley State | W 64-52 | 4-10 (1-0) | 25 – McKnight | 8 – Banyard | 5 – McKnight | K. L. Johnson Complex (1,651); Pine Bluff, AR |
| Jan 12, 2019; 7:30 pm | | Alabama State | W 82-71 | 5-10 (2-0) | 27 – McKnight | 8 – McKnight | 4 – Jackson | K. L. Johnson Complex (1,655); Pine Bluff, AR |
| Jan 14, 2019; 7:30 pm | | Alabama A&M | W 50-49 | 6-10 (3-0) | 13 – McKnight | 6 – Jackson | 7 – McKnight | K. L. Johnson Complex (1,624); Pine Bluff, AR |
| Jan 19, 2019; 5:30 pm | | at Southern | L 67-69 | 6-11 (3-1) | 29 – McKnight | 5 – Doss | 2 – Doss | F. G. Clark Center (921); Baton Rouge, LA |
| Jan 21, 2019; 7:30 pm | | at Alcorn State | L 69-74 | 6-12 (3-2) | 29 – McKnight | 6 – Doss | 5 – Banyard | Davey Whitney Complex (546); Lorman, MS |
| Jan 26, 2019; 7:30 pm | | Texas Southern | W 90-86 | 7-12 (4-2) | 30 – McKnight | 6 – McKnight | 8 – Jackson | K. L. Johnson Complex (2,478); Pine Bluff, AR |
| Jan 28, 2019; 7:30 pm | | Prairie View A&M | L 63-79 | 7-13 (4-3) | 18 – Banyard | 10 – Carter | 4 – Doss | K. L. Johnson Complex (1,542); Pine Bluff, AR |
| Feb 2, 2019; 5:30 pm | | at Grambling State | L 55-79 | 7-14 (4-4) | 19 – Doss | 9 – McKnight | 2 – Carter | Hobdy Center (1,091); Grambling, LA |
| Feb 4, 2019; 7:30 pm | | at Jackson State | L 52-65 | 7-15 (4-5) | 12 – McKnight | 7 – McKnight | 3 – Doss | Williams Assembly Center (824); Jackson, MS |
| Feb 9, 2019; 5:00 pm | | at Alabama State | W 75-69 | 8-15 (5-5) | 25 – Doss | 6 – McKnight | 4 – McKnight | Dunn–Oliver Acadome (510); Montgomery, AL |
| Feb 11, 2019; 7:30 pm | | at Alabama A&M | W 69-60 | 9-15 (6-5) | 24 – McKnight | 7 – Banyard | 3 – McKnight | Elmore Gymnasium (342); Normal, AL |
| Feb 16, 2019; 7:30 pm | | Southern | W 61-45 | 10-15 (7-5) | 22 – McKnight | 6 – Doss | 3 – Carter | K. L. Johnson Complex; Pine Bluff, AR |
| Feb 18, 2019; 7:30 pm, ESPNU | | Alcorn State | W 73-62 | 11-15 (8-5) | 25 – Doss | 7 – Banyard | 3 – Doss | K. L. Johnson Complex (3,655); Pine Bluff, AR |
| Feb 23, 2019; 7:30 pm | | Texas Southern | L 74-94 | 11-16 (8-6) | 23 – McKnight | 8 – Doss | 5 – Hardy | Health and Physical Education Arena (1,582); Houston, TX |
| Feb 25, 2019; 7:30 pm | | at Prairie View A&M | L 44-48 | 11-17 (8-7) | 20 – Doss | 12 – Carter | 3 – Hardy | William J. Nicks Building (456); Prairie View, TX |
| Mar 2, 2019; 7:30 pm | | Grambling State | W 70-66 | 12-17 (9-7) | 21 – McKnight | 7 – Jackson | 10 – McKnight | K. L. Johnson Complex (2,412); Pine Bluff, AR |
| Mar 4, 2019; 7:30 pm | | Jackson State | L 56-57 | 12-18 (9-8) | 18 – McKnight | 5 – Carter | 2 – McKnight | K. L. Johnson Complex (2,437); Pine Bluff, AR |
| Mar 9, 2019; 7:30 pm | | at Mississippi Valley State | W 91-57 | 13-18 (10-8) | 28 – McKnight | 8 – McKnight | 4 – McKnight | Harrison HPER Complex (2,987); Itta Bena, MS |
SWAC tournament
| Mar 12, 2019; 7:30 pm | (5) | at (4) Grambling State; Quarterfinals | L 52-59 | 13-19 | 11 – Doss | 7 – Doss | 3 – Hardy | Hobdy Center (1,421); Grambling, LA |
*Non-conference game. ^{#}Rankings from AP Poll. (#) Tournament seedings in parentheses. All times are in Central Time.
