= 2018–19 Texas Tech Red Raiders basketball team =

American college basketball season

2018–19 Texas Tech Red Raiders basketball

NCAA tournament, Runner-up Big 12 regular season co-champions CBE Hall of Fame Classic champions

National Championship Game, L 77–85 ^{OT} vs. Virginia
- Conference: Big 12 Conference

Ranking
- Coaches: No. 2
- AP: No. 9
- Record: 31–7 (14–4 Big 12)
- Head coach: Chris Beard (3rd season)
- Assistant coaches: Mark Adams; Brian Burg; Glynn Cyprien
- Home arena: United Supermarkets Arena

2018–19 Big 12 men's basketball standings
	Conf.				Overall
Team	W		L	PCT	W		L	PCT
No. 19 Kansas State	14	–	4	.778	25	–	9	.735
No. 2 Texas Tech	14	–	4	.778	31	–	7	.816
No. 16 Kansas	12	–	6	.667	26	–	10	.722
Baylor	10	–	8	.556	20	–	14	.588
No. 25 Iowa State †	9	–	9	.500	23	–	12	.657
Texas	8	–	10	.444	21	–	16	.568
Oklahoma	7	–	11	.389	20	–	14	.588
TCU	7	–	11	.389	23	–	14	.622
Oklahoma State	5	–	13	.278	12	–	20	.375
West Virginia	4	–	14	.222	15	–	21	.417
† 2019 Big 12 tournament winner Rankings from AP Poll

The 2018–19 Texas Tech Red Raiders basketball team represented Texas Tech University in the 2018–19 NCAA Division I men's basketball season as a member of the Big 12 Conference. The Red Raiders were led by third-year coach Chris Beard. They played their home games at the United Supermarkets Arena in Lubbock, Texas. They finished the season 31–7, 14–4 in Big 12 play to win the Big 12 regular season title alongside Kansas State. They lost in the quarterfinals of the Big 12 tournament to West Virginia. They received an at-large bid to the NCAA tournament, where they defeated Northern Kentucky, Buffalo, Michigan and Gonzaga to advance to their first Final Four in school history. In the Final Four they defeated Michigan State to advance to the National Championship Game, in which they were defeated by Virginia in overtime. With 31 wins, they finished with the most wins in school history.

== Previous season ==
They finished the season 27–10, 11–7 in Big 12 play to finish in a tie for second place. They defeated Baylor in the quarterfinals of the Big 12 tournament before losing in the semifinals to West Virginia. They received an at-large bid to the NCAA tournament, where they defeated Stephen F. Austin, Florida, and Purdue to advance to the Elite Eight for the first time in school history. In the Elite Eight, they were eliminated by Villanova.

== Offseason ==
=== Departures ===
Name	Number	Pos.	Height	Weight	Year	Hometown	Reason for departure
Tommy Hamilton IV	0	C	6'10"	250	RS senior	Chicago, IL	Graduated
Zhaire Smith	2	G	6'5"	195	Freshman	Garland, TX	Declared for 2018 NBA draft
Josh Webster	3	G	6'4"	175	Junior	St. Louis, MO	Transferred to Missouri State
Hyron Edwards	4	G	6'0"	170	Junior	East Chicago, IN	Transferred to Colorado State
Justin Gray	5	F	6'6"	210	Senior	Tampa, FL	Graduated
Niem Stevenson	10	G	6'5"	205	Senior	Irving, TX	Graduated
Zach Smith	11	F	6'8"	220	Senior	Plano, TX	Graduated
Keenan Evans	12	G	6'3"	190	Senior	Richardson, TX	Graduated
Alex Vilarino	13	G	6'1"	180	Freshman	McKinney, TX	Transferred to Boston University

=== Incoming transfers ===
Name	Number	Pos.	Height	Weight	Year	Hometown	Previous school
Deshawn Corprew	3	G	6'6"	190	Junior	Norfolk, VA	South Plains College.
Tariq Owens	11	F	6'11"	205	RS senior	Odenton, MD	St. John's
Matt Mooney	13	G	6'3"	210	RS senior	Wauconda, IL	South Dakota

== Recruits ==
=== 2018 recruiting class ===
College recruiting
Name	Hometown	School	Height	Weight	Commit date
Kyler Edwards #18 SG	Arlington, TX	Findley Prep	6 ft 4 in (1.93 m)	195 lb (88 kg)	Sep 17, 2017
Kyler Edwards #18 SG	Recruit ratings: Scout: Rivals: 247Sports: ESPN:				
Khavon Moore #9 SF	Macon, GA	Westside High School	6 ft 8 in (2.03 m)	187 lb (85 kg)	Feb 26, 2018
Khavon Moore #9 SF	Recruit ratings: Scout: Rivals: 247Sports: ESPN:				
Kevin McCullar Jr. #42 SF	San Antonio, TX	Karen Wagner High School	6 ft 5 in (1.96 m)	180 lb (82 kg)	Jul 5, 2018
Kevin McCullar Jr. #42 SF	Recruit ratings: Scout: Rivals: 247Sports: ESPN:				
Josh Mballa; SF	Bordeaux, France	Putnam Science Academy	6 ft 8 in (2.03 m)	210 lb (95 kg)	Jul 12, 2018
Josh Mballa; SF	Recruit ratings: Scout: Rivals: 247Sports: ESPN:				
Andrei Savrasov; PF	Saint Petersburg, Russia	BC Zenit	6 ft 9 in (2.06 m)	215 lb (98 kg)	Jan 28, 2019
Andrei Savrasov; PF	Recruit ratings: Scout: Rivals: 247Sports: ESPN:				
Overall recruit ranking:
Note: In many cases, Scout, Rivals, 247Sports, On3, and ESPN may conflict in their listings of height and weight.; In these cases, the average was taken. ESPN grades are on a 100-point scale.; Sources: "2018 Team Ranking". Rivals.

=== 2019 recruiting class ===
College recruiting (2019)
Name	Hometown	School	Height	Weight	Commit date
Clarence Nadolny #43 CG	Montreuil, France	Scotland Performance Institute	6 ft 3 in (1.91 m)	190 lb (86 kg)	Apr 29, 2019
Clarence Nadolny #43 CG	Recruit ratings: Scout: Rivals: 247Sports: ESPN:				
Jahmi'us Ramsey #5 CG	Duncanville, TX	Duncanville High School	6 ft 4 in (1.93 m)	195 lb (88 kg)	Nov 8, 2018
Jahmi'us Ramsey #5 CG	Recruit ratings: Scout: Rivals: 247Sports: ESPN:				
Terrence Shannon Jr. #21 SF	Chicago, IL	IMG Academy	6 ft 6 in (1.98 m)	200 lb (91 kg)	Mar 11, 2019
Terrence Shannon Jr. #21 SF	Recruit ratings: Scout: Rivals: 247Sports: ESPN:				
Tyreek Smith #22 PF	Baton Rouge, LA	Trinity Christian School	6 ft 8 in (2.03 m)	205 lb (93 kg)	May 18, 2019
Tyreek Smith #22 PF	Recruit ratings: Scout: Rivals: 247Sports: ESPN:				
Russel Tchewa #71 C	Douala, Cameroon	Putnam Science Academy	7 ft 0 in (2.13 m)	215 lb (98 kg)	Oct 10, 2018
Russel Tchewa #71 C	Recruit ratings: Scout: Rivals: 247Sports: ESPN:				
Overall recruit ranking:
Note: In many cases, Scout, Rivals, 247Sports, On3, and ESPN may conflict in their listings of height and weight.; In these cases, the average was taken. ESPN grades are on a 100-point scale.; Sources: "2019 Team Ranking". Rivals.

== Roster ==
2018–19 Texas Tech Red Raiders men's basketball team
Players
Coaches

Pos.	#	Name	Height	Weight	Year	Previous school	Hometown
G	0	Kyler Edwards	6 ft 4 in (1.93 m)	200 lb (91 kg)	Fr	Findlay Prep	Arlington, TX
G	1	Brandone Francis	6 ft 5 in (1.96 m)	215 lb (98 kg)	RS Sr	Arlington Country Day; Florida	La Romana, DR
F	3	DeShawn Corprew	6 ft 5 in (1.96 m)	210 lb (95 kg)	RS So	Quality Education Academy; South Plains College	Norfolk, VA
F	10	Malik Ondigo	6 ft 10 in (2.08 m)	215 lb (98 kg)	So	Dysart/Putnam Science Academy	El Mirage, AZ
F	11	Tariq Owens	6 ft 10 in (2.08 m)	205 lb (93 kg)	RS Sr	Mount Zion Prep; St. John's	Odenton, MD
F	12	Andrei Savrasov (redshirt)	6 ft 8 in (2.03 m)	225 lb (102 kg)	Fr	BC Zenit	Saint Petersburg, Russia
G	13	Matt Mooney	6 ft 3 in (1.91 m)	200 lb (91 kg)	RS Sr	Notre Dame College Prep; South Dakota	Wauconda, IL
G	15	Kevin McCullar Jr. (redshirt)	6 ft 6 in (1.98 m)	195 lb (88 kg)	Fr	Karen Wagner	San Antonio, TX
G	20	Parker Hicks (W)	6 ft 6 in (1.98 m)	210 lb (95 kg)	So	Decatur	Decatur, TX
F	21	Khavon Moore	6 ft 7 in (2.01 m)	215 lb (98 kg)	Fr	Westside	Macon, GA
G	23	Jarrett Culver	6 ft 6 in (1.98 m)	195 lb (88 kg)	So	Coronado	Lubbock, TX
G	24	Avery Benson (W)	6 ft 3 in (1.91 m)	190 lb (86 kg)	RS Fr	Southwest Christian Academy	Springdale, AR
G	25	Davide Moretti	6 ft 2 in (1.88 m)	175 lb (79 kg)	So	Treviso Basket	Bologna, Italy
G	30	Andrew Sorrells (W)	6 ft 3 in (1.91 m)	175 lb (79 kg)	RS Jr	Birdville	North Richland Hills, TX
C	32	Norense Odiase	6 ft 8 in (2.03 m)	250 lb (113 kg)	RS Sr	North Crowley	Crowley, TX
F	35	Josh Mballa	6 ft 7 in (2.01 m)	215 lb (98 kg)	Fr	Putnam Science Academy	Bordeaux, France

Head coach

- Chris Beard (Texas)

Assistant coach(es)

- Mark Adams (Texas Tech)
- Brian Burg (Lake Erie)
- Glynn Cyprien (Southern–New Orleans)

Legend

- (C) Team captain
- (S) Suspended
- (I) Ineligible
- (W) Walk-on
- Injured
- Current redshirt

Roster

== Schedule and results ==
Date time, TV	Rank^{#}	Opponent^{#}	Result	Record	High points	High rebounds	High assists	Site (attendance) city, state
Regular season
November 6, 2018*; 6:30 pm, FSSW+		Incarnate Word	W 87–37	1–0	16 – Culver	6 – Odiase	6 – Mooney	United Supermarkets Arena (10,198); Lubbock, TX
November 9, 2018*; 8:00 pm, FSSW+		Mississippi Valley State; Hall of Fame Classic campus-site game	W 84–52	2–0	17 – Moretti	10 – Odiase	5 – Mooney	United Supermarkets Arena (9,873); Lubbock, TX
November 13, 2018*; 6:30 pm, FSSW		Southeastern Louisiana; Hall of Fame Classic campus-site game	W 59–40	3–0	21 – Culver	13 – Odiase	4 – Tied	United Supermarkets Arena (8,650); Lubbock, TX
November 19, 2018*; 8:30 pm, ESPN2		vs. USC; Hall of Fame Classic semifinals	W 78–63	4–0	18 – Culver/Owens	9 – Culver	5 – Culver	Sprint Center; Kansas City, MO
November 20, 2018*; 8:30 pm, ESPN2		vs. Nebraska; Hall of Fame Classic finals	W 70–52	5–0	26 – Culver	8 – Owens	2 – 3 Tied	Sprint Center (6,521); Kansas City, MO
November 24, 2018*; 4:30 pm, FSSW		Northern Colorado	W 93–62	6–0	20 – Culver	5 – 3 Tied	6 – Culver	United Supermarkets Arena (9,689); Lubbock, TX
December 1, 2018*; 1:30 pm, ESPNU	No. 20	vs. Memphis; HoopHall Miami Invitational	W 78–67	7–0	20 – Culver	11 – Owens	6 – Tied	American Airlines Arena; Miami, FL
December 5, 2018*; 6:30 pm, FSSW+	No. 13	Arkansas–Pine Bluff	W 65–47	8–0	13 – Culver	7 – Culver	5 – Mooney	United Supermarkets Arena (9,503); Lubbock, TX
December 12, 2018*; 6:30 pm, FSSW+	No. 11	Northwestern State	W 79–44	9–0	15 – Culver	8 – Owens	6 – Moretti	United Supermarkets Arena (10,086); Lubbock, TX
December 15, 2018*; 6:00 pm	No. 11	Abilene Christian; Throwback Game	W 82–48	10–0	30 – Culver	8 – Corprew	4 – Culver	Lubbock Municipal Coliseum (7,169); Lubbock, TX
December 20, 2018*; 6:00 pm, ESPN2	No. 12	vs. No. 2 Duke; New York Showcase	L 58–69	10–1	25 – Culver	7 – Odiase	4 – Culver	Madison Square Garden (19,812); New York, NY
December 28, 2018*; 6:00 pm, FSSW+	No. 11	Texas–Rio Grande Valley	W 71–46	11–1	19 – Culver	10 – Corprew	6 – Mooney	United Supermarkets Arena (11,418); Lubbock, TX
January 2, 2019; 6:00 pm, ESPNU	No. 11	at West Virginia	W 62–59	12–1 (1–0)	18 – Culver	6 – Culver	2 – Culver	WVU Coliseum; Morgantown, WV
January 5, 2019; 1:00 pm, ESPNU	No. 11	Kansas State; Saturday Showcase	W 63–57	13–1 (2–0)	19 – Moretti	8 – Owens	3 – Culver	United Supermarkets Arena (15,098); Lubbock, TX
January 8, 2019; 8:00 pm, ESPNews	No. 8	No. 23 Oklahoma; Super Tuesday	W 66–59	14–1 (3–0)	23 – Culver	13 – Culver	3 – Moretti	United Supermarkets Arena (14,090); Lubbock, TX
January 12, 2019; 1:00 pm, LHN	No. 8	at Texas	W 68–62	15–1 (4–0)	22 – Mooney	9 – Culver	6 – Culver	Frank Erwin Center (14,070); Austin, TX
January 16, 2019; 8:00 pm, ESPNU	No. 8	Iowa State	L 64–68	15–2 (4–1)	20 – Culver	16 – Culver	2 – Edwards	United Supermarkets Arena (15,098); Lubbock, TX
January 19, 2019; 5:00 pm, ESPN2	No. 8	at Baylor; Saturday Showcase	L 62–73	15–3 (4–2)	19 – Culver	9 – Culver	5 – Culver	Ferrell Center (9,018); Waco, TX
January 22, 2019; 6:00 pm, ESPN2	No. 14-T	at Kansas State; Super Tuesday	L 45–58	15–4 (4–3)	17 – Culver	7 – Culver	3 – Tied	Bramlage Coliseum (11,134); Manhattan, KS
January 26, 2019*; 5:00 pm, ESPN2	No. 14-T	Arkansas; Big 12/SEC Challenge/Saturday Showcase	W 67–64	16–4	21 – Moretti	7 – Odiase	4 – Culver	United Supermarkets Arena (14,290); Lubbock, TX
January 28, 2019; 8:00 pm, ESPN	No. 16	TCU; Big Monday	W 84–65	17–4 (5–3)	18 – Tied	7 – Culver	7 – Moretti	United Supermarkets Arena (12,736); Lubbock, TX
February 2, 2019; 3:00 pm, CBS	No. 16	at No. 11 Kansas	L 63–79	17–5 (5–4)	14 – Moretti	10 – Owens	3 – Mooney	Allen Fieldhouse (16,300); Lawrence, KS
February 4, 2019; 8:00 pm, ESPN	No. 18	West Virginia; Big Monday	W 81–50	18–5 (6–4)	16 – Francis	10 – Odiase	5 – Mooney	United Supermarkets Arena (12,831); Lubbock, TX
February 9, 2019; 5:00 pm, ESPNU	No. 18	at Oklahoma; Saturday Showcase	W 66–54	19–5 (7–4)	14 – Moretti	11 – Odiase	6 – Edwards	Lloyd Noble Center (9,463); Norman, OK
February 13, 2019; 8:00 pm, ESPN2	No. 15	at Oklahoma State; Wednesday Night Hoops	W 78–50	20–5 (8–4)	19 – Culver	7 – Owens	8 – Moretti	Gallagher-Iba Arena (6,155); Stillwater, OK
February 16, 2019; 1:00 pm, ESPN	No. 15	Baylor; Saturday Showcase	W 86–61	21–5 (9–4)	18 – Culver	8 – Culver	4 – Culver	United Supermarkets Arena (14,598); Lubbock, TX
February 23, 2019; 8:00 pm, ESPN	No. 14	No. 12 Kansas; Saturday Showcase/Rivalry Week	W 91–62	22–5 (10–4)	26 – Culver	13 – Odiase	6 – Mooney	United Supermarkets Arena (15,098); Lubbock, TX
February 27, 2019; 6:00 pm, ESPNU	No. 11	Oklahoma State	W 84–80 ^{OT}	23–5 (11–4)	20 – Moretti	10 – Culver	6 – Mooney	United Supermarkets Arena (12,248); Lubbock, TX
March 2, 2019; 3:00 pm, ESPN2	No. 11	at TCU; Saturday Showcase	W 81–66	24–5 (12–4)	15 – Culver	13 – Owens	7 – Culver	Schollmaier Arena (6,616); Fort Worth, TX
March 4, 2019; 8:00 pm, ESPN	No. 8	Texas; Big Monday	W 70–51	25–5 (13–4)	16 – Culver	7 – Culver	4 – Tied	United Supermarkets Arena (15,098); Lubbock, TX
March 9, 2019; 1:00 pm, ESPNews	No. 8	at Iowa State; Saturday Showcase	W 80–73	26–5 (14–4)	31 – Culver	14 – Owens	5 – Mooney	Hilton Coliseum (14,384); Ames, IA
Big 12 Tournament
March 14, 2019; 6:00 pm, ESPN2	(2) No. 7	vs. (10) West Virginia; Quarterfinals	L 74–79	26–6	26 – Culver	10 – Culver	5 – Mooney	Sprint Center; Kansas City, MO
NCAA tournament
March 22, 2019*; 12:30 pm, TNT	(3 W) No. 9	vs. (14 W) Northern Kentucky; First Round	W 72–57	27–6	29 – Culver	8 – Culver	8 – Mooney	BOK Center (12,352); Tulsa, OK
March 24, 2019*; 5:10 pm, TNT	(3 W) No. 9	vs. (6 W) No. 15 Buffalo; Second Round	W 78–58	28–6	16 – Culver	15 – Odiase	5 – Culver	BOK Center (12,606); Tulsa, OK
March 28, 2019*; 8:39 pm, CBS	(3 W) No. 9	vs. (2 W) No. 8 Michigan; Sweet Sixteen	W 63–44	29–6	22 – Culver	10 – Owens	4 – Tied	Honda Center (16,145); Anaheim, CA
March 30, 2019*; 5:09 pm, TBS	(3 W) No. 9	vs. (1 W) No. 4 Gonzaga; Elite Eight	W 75–69	30–6	19 – Culver	7 – Owens	5 – Mooney	Honda Center (15,277); Anaheim, CA
April 6, 2019*; 8:49 pm, CBS	(3 W) No. 9	vs. (2 E) No. 5 Michigan State; Final Four	W 61–51	31–6	22 – Mooney	9 – Odiase	2 – Tied	U.S. Bank Stadium (72,711); Minneapolis, MN
April 8, 2019*; 8:20 pm, CBS	(3 W) No. 9	vs. (1 S) No. 2 Virginia; National Championship	L 77–85 ^{OT}	31–7	17 – Francis	9 – Culver	6 – Culver	U.S. Bank Stadium (72,062); Minneapolis, MN
*Non-conference game. ^{#}Rankings from AP Poll. (#) Tournament seedings in parentheses. W=West, E=East, S=South. All times are in Central Time.

== Rankings ==
Ranking movements Legend: ██ Increase in ranking ██ Decrease in ranking — = Not ranked RV = Received votes т = Tied with team above or below
	Week																				
Poll	Pre	1	2	3	4	5	6	7	8	9	10	11	12	13	14	15	16	17	18	19	Final
AP	RV	RV	RV	20	13	11	12	11	11	8	8	14-T	16	18	15	14	11	8	7	9	Not released
Coaches	—	—	RV	19	13	11	11	13	11	8	9	13	15	18	15	14	11	8	6	10	2

*AP does not release post-NCAA tournament rankings.
