= 2018–19 Southern Jaguars basketball team =

American college basketball season

2018–19 Southern Jaguars basketball
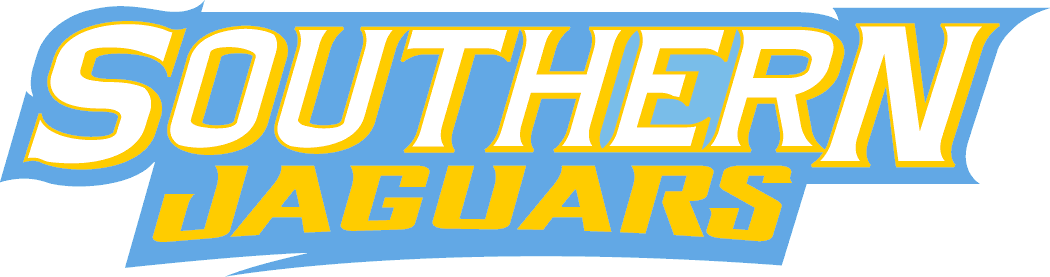
- Conference: Southwestern Athletic Conference
- Record: 7–25 (6–12 SWAC)
- Head coach: Sean Woods (1st season)
- Assistant coaches: Pedro "Petey" Cipriano; Jethro Hillman; Chrys Cornelius
- Home arena: F. G. Clark Center

2018–19 SWAC men's basketball standings
	Conf.				Overall
Team	W		L	PCT	W		L	PCT
Prairie View A&M †	17	–	1	.944	22	–	13	.629
Texas Southern	14	–	4	.778	24	–	14	.632
Jackson State	10	–	8	.556	13	–	19	.406
Grambling State	10	–	8	.556	17	–	17	.500
Arkansas–Pine Bluff	10	–	8	.556	13	–	19	.406
Alabama State	9	–	9	.500	12	–	19	.387
Southern	6	–	12	.333	7	–	25	.219
Alcorn State	6	–	12	.333	10	–	21	.323
Mississippi Valley State	4	–	14	.222	6	–	26	.188
Alabama A&M*	4	–	14	.222	5	–	27	.156
† 2019 SWAC tournament winner *ineligible for postseason due to APR violations

The 2018–19 Southern Jaguars basketball team represented Southern University during the 2018–19 NCAA Division I men's basketball season. The Jaguars, led by head coach Sean Woods, played their home games at the F. G. Clark Center in Baton Rouge, Louisiana as members of the Southwestern Athletic Conference.

== Previous season ==
The Jaguars finished the 2017–18 season 15–18, 10–8 in SWAC play to finish in fifth place. Due to Grambling State's Academic Progress Rate violations and subsequent postseason ineligibility, the Jaguars received the No. 4 seed in the SWAC tournament. They defeated Jackson State in the quarterfinals before losing to Arkansas–Pine Bluff in the semifinals.

On April 12, 2018, Southern hired Stetson assistant coach and former Morehead State/Mississippi Valley State head coach Sean Woods for the full-time job.

== Roster ==
2018–19 Southern Jaguars men's basketball team
Players
Coaches

Pos.	#	Name	Height	Weight	Year	Hometown
G	0	Richard Lee	6 ft 4 in (1.93 m)	200 lb (91 kg)	Sr	Fort Lauderdale, Florida
G	1	LaQuentin Collins	6 ft 3 in (1.91 m)	200 lb (91 kg)	Sr	Monroe, Louisiana
F	2	Emanual Shepherd	6 ft 8 in (2.03 m)	200 lb (91 kg)	Sr	Toronto, Ontario, Canada
G	3	Eddie Reese	6 ft 1 in (1.85 m)	160 lb (73 kg)	Jr	Detroit, Michigan
G	4	Chris Thomas	6 ft 4 in (1.93 m)	195 lb (88 kg)	RS Sr	Baton Rouge, Louisiana
G	10	Jamar Sandifer	6 ft 4 in (1.93 m)	205 lb (93 kg)	So	Dallas, Texas
F	12	Jared Sam	6 ft 10 in (2.08 m)	240 lb (109 kg)	Sr	Baton Rouge, Louisiana
G	13	Torrey Mayo	5 ft 8 in (1.73 m)	160 lb (73 kg)	Jr	Deltona, Florida
G	14	Aaron Ray	6 ft 3 in (1.91 m)	190 lb (86 kg)	Jr	Middletown, New York
F	20	Sidney Umude	6 ft 7 in (2.01 m)	205 lb (93 kg)	RS Jr	San Antonio, Texas
F	21	Patrick Smith	6 ft 7 in (2.01 m)	205 lb (93 kg)	RS Sr	Bernice, Louisiana
C	22	Shaquille Benson	6 ft 10 in (2.08 m)	260 lb (118 kg)	Jr	New Orleans, Louisiana
F	24	Mubashar Ali	7 ft 0 in (2.13 m)	230 lb (104 kg)	RS Fr	Helsinki, Finland
G	30	DeRias Johnson	6 ft 3 in (1.91 m)	180 lb (82 kg)	RS Fr	Dallas, Texas

Head coach

- Sean Woods (Kentucky)

Assistant coach(es)

- Pedro "Petey" Cipriano (Southern)
- Chrys Cornelius (Western Illinois)
- Jethro Hillman (Miami (FL))

Legend

- (C) Team captain
- (S) Suspended
- (I) Ineligible
- (W) Walk-on
- Injured
- Current redshirt

Roster
Last update: January 24, 2018

== Schedule and results ==
Date time, TV	Rank^{#}	Opponent^{#}	Result	Record	High points	High rebounds	High assists	Site (attendance) city, state
Non-conference regular season
SWAC regular season
SWAC tournament
*Non-conference game. ^{#}Rankings from AP Poll. (#) Tournament seedings in parentheses. All times are in Central Time.
