= 2019 SWAC men's basketball tournament =

- Classification: Division I
- Season: 2018–19
- Teams: 8
- Site: Bill Harris Arena; Birmingham, Alabama
- First round site: Campus sites
- Champions: Prairie View A&M (2nd title)
- Winning coach: Byron Smith (1st title)
- MVP: Gary Blackston (Prairie View A&M)
- Television: ESPN3, ESPNU

2018–19 SWAC men's basketball standings
	Conf.				Overall
Team	W		L	PCT	W		L	PCT
Prairie View A&M †	17	–	1	.944	22	–	13	.629
Texas Southern	14	–	4	.778	24	–	14	.632
Jackson State	10	–	8	.556	13	–	19	.406
Grambling State	10	–	8	.556	17	–	17	.500
Arkansas–Pine Bluff	10	–	8	.556	13	–	19	.406
Alabama State	9	–	9	.500	12	–	19	.387
Southern	6	–	12	.333	7	–	25	.219
Alcorn State	6	–	12	.333	10	–	21	.323
Mississippi Valley State	4	–	14	.222	6	–	26	.188
Alabama A&M*	4	–	14	.222	5	–	27	.156
*ineligible for postseason due to APR violations
† 2019 SWAC tournament winner

The 2019 SWAC men's basketball tournament was the postseason men's basketball tournament for the Southwestern Athletic Conference during the 2018–19 season. Tournament first round games were played at the campus of the higher seeded team on March 12. The remainder of the tournament was held on March 15 and 16, 2019 at the Bill Harris Arena in Birmingham, Alabama. Prairie View A&M defeated Texas Southern 92–86 in the championship game to win the tournament, and received the SWAC's automatic bid to the 2019 NCAA tournament. It was the second SWAC title for Prairie View A&M, and the first since the 1997–98 season.

== Seeds ==
The top eight teams qualified for the conference tournament. Teams were seeded by conference record, with a tiebreaker system used for teams with identical conference records. The top 4 seeds host their quarterfinal round games. Alabama A&M is ineligible for postseason play due to APR violations.

Seed	School	Conference	Tiebreaker
1	Prairie View A&M	17–1	
2	Texas Southern	14–4	
3	Jackson State	10–8	4–0 vs. UAPB/GSU
4	Grambling State	10–8	1–3 vs. JSU/UAPB, Better point differential in season split with UAPB
5	Arkansas–Pine Bluff	10–8	1–3 vs. JSU/GSU, Worse point differential in season split with Grambling State
6	Alabama State	9–9	
7	Southern	6–12	Better point differential in season split with Alcorn State
8	Alcorn State	6–12	Worse point differential in season split with Southern

== Schedule and results ==
Game	Time	Matchup	Score	Television
Quarterfinals – Tuesday, March 12 – campus sites
1	7:30 pm	No. 8 Alcorn State at No. 1 Prairie View A&M	66–86	ESPN3
2	7:30 pm	No. 5 Arkansas–Pine Bluff at No. 4 Grambling State	52–59	ESPN3
3	7:30 pm	No. 7 Southern at No. 2 Texas Southern	70–80	ESPN3
4	8:00 pm	No. 6 Alabama State at No. 3 Jackson State	58–49	ESPN3
Semifinals – Friday, March 15 – Bill Harris Arena, Birmingham, AL
5	2:30 pm	No. 1 Prairie View A&M vs. No. 4 Grambling State	81–71	ESPN3
6	8:30 pm	No. 2 Texas Southern vs. No. 6 Alabama State	80–66	ESPN3
Final – Saturday, March 16 – Bill Harris Arena, Birmingham, AL
7	5:00 pm	No. 1 Prairie View A&M vs. No. 2 Texas Southern	92–86	ESPNU
Game times in CST. Rankings denote tournament seed.

== Bracket ==
Quarterfinals; March 12; ESPN3
1	Prairie View A&M	86
8	Alcorn State	66
4	Grambling State	59
5	Arkansas–Pine Bluff	52
2	Texas Southern	80
7	Southern	70
3	Jackson State	49
6	Alabama State	58

Semifinals; March 15; ESPN3
1	Prairie View A&M	81
4	Grambling State	71
2	Texas Southern	80
6	Alabama State	66

Championship; March 16; ESPNU
1	Prairie View A&M	92
2	Texas Southern	86

First round games at campus sites of lower-numbered seeds
