= Fredrick C. Hobdy Assembly Center =

American university sports arena

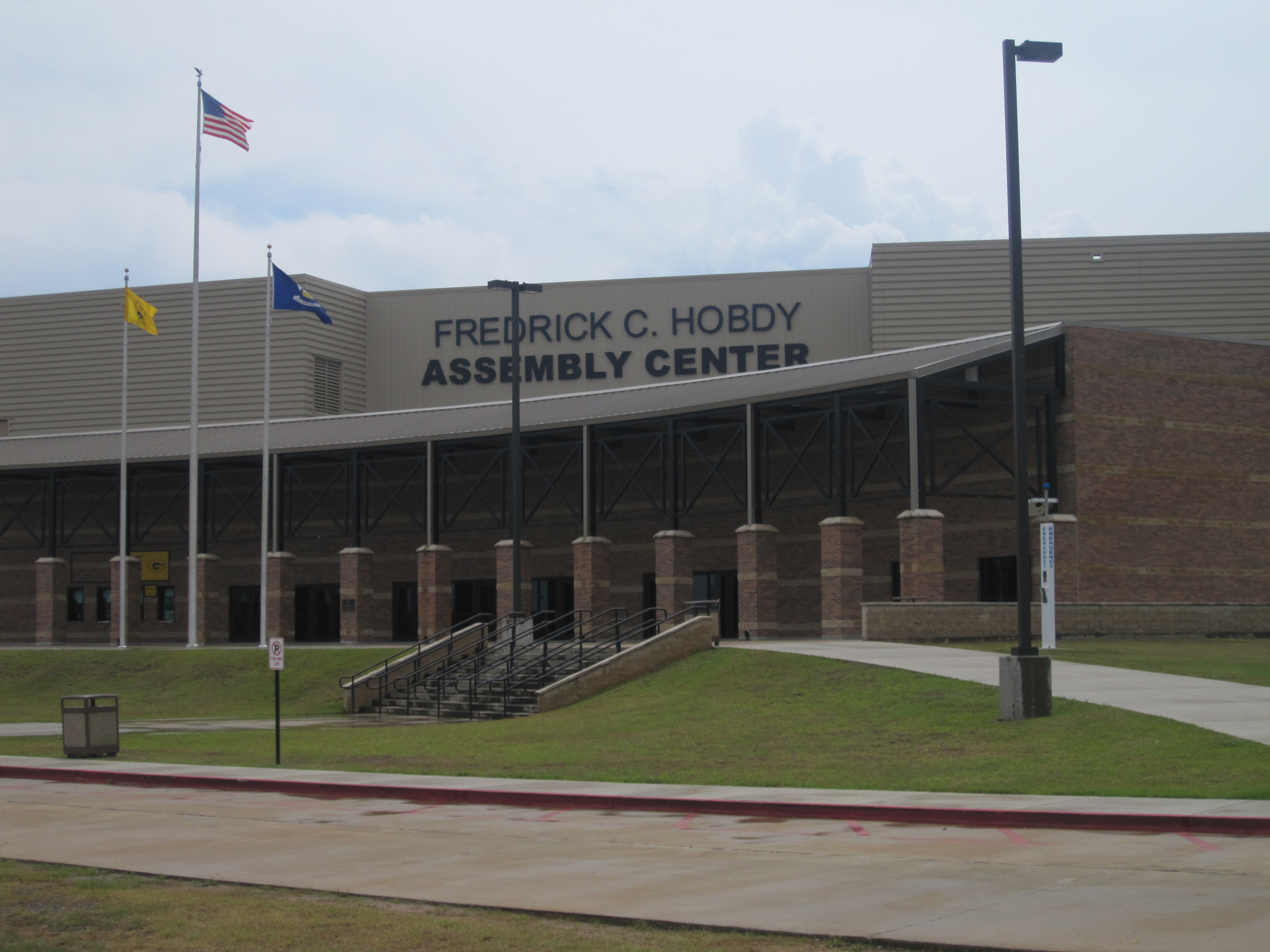
- Interactive map of Fredrick C. Hobdy Assembly Center
- Location: 1234 Grambling Road, Grambling, Louisiana
- Coordinates: 32.520284°N 92.723578°W
- Owner: Grambling State University
- Operator: Grambling State University
- Capacity: 7,500
- Surface: Hardwood

Construction
- Groundbreaking: April 21, 2004
- Opened: April 3, 2007
- Cost: $23.7 million
- Architects: AE Design Group, Inc.
- Structural engineer: Bernhard Mechanical Contractors
- General contractor: Lincoln Builders Inc.

Tenant
- Grambling State Tigers

The Fredrick C. Hobdy Assembly Center is a 7,500-seat multi-purpose arena in Grambling, Louisiana. It is home to the Grambling State University Tigers basketball team, along with Memorial Gymnasium. The arena also hosts concerts and events. It is named after former Tiger head basketball coach, Fred Hobdy.

The arena opened in 2007 and was first used as the location of funeral services for former Grambling State football coach, Eddie Robinson.

== See also ==
- List of NCAA Division I basketball arenas
- List of music venues
