= 2020–21 Alcorn State Braves basketball team =

American college basketball season

2020–21 Alcorn State Braves basketball
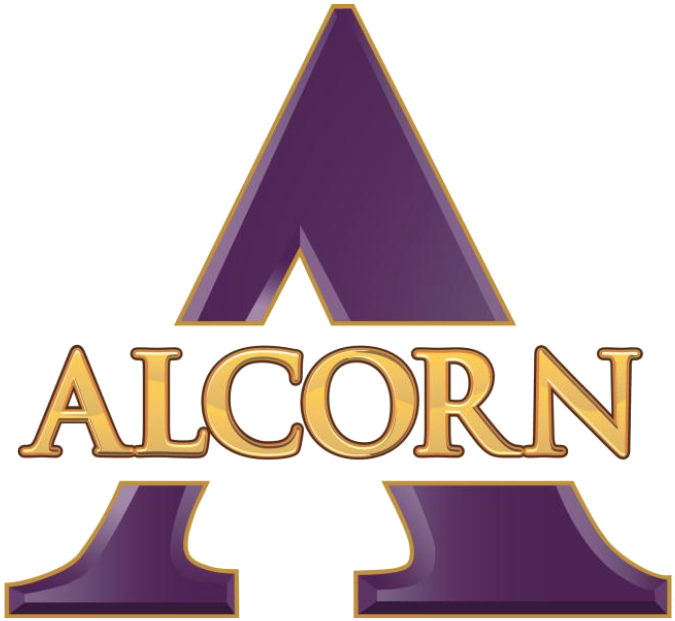
- Conference: Southwestern Athletic Conference
- Record: 6–13 (6–7 SWAC)
- Head coach: Landon Bussie (1st season)
- Assistant coaches: Evans Davis; Tyler Adams
- Home arena: Davey Whitney Complex

2020–21 SWAC men's basketball standings
	Conf.				Overall
Team	W		L	PCT	W		L	PCT
Prairie View A&M	13	–	0	1.000	16	–	5	.762
Jackson State	11	–	0	1.000	12	–	6	.667
Texas Southern †	10	–	3	.769	17	–	9	.654
Grambling State	9	–	6	.600	12	–	12	.500
Southern	8	–	6	.571	8	–	11	.421
Alcorn State	6	–	7	.462	6	–	13	.316
Alabama A&M*	4	–	9	.308	6	–	9	.400
Alabama State*	4	–	14	.222	4	–	14	.222
Arkansas–Pine Bluff	3	–	12	.200	4	–	21	.160
Mississippi Valley State	2	–	13	.133	2	–	22	.083
† 2021 SWAC tournament winner *Ineligible for postseason due to APR violations

The 2020–21 Alcorn State Braves basketball team represented Alcorn State University in the 2020–21 NCAA Division I men's basketball season. The Braves, led by first-year head coach Landon Bussie, played their home games at the Davey Whitney Complex in Lorman, Mississippi as members of the Southwestern Athletic Conference.

== Previous season ==
The Braves finished the 2019–20 season 15–15, 11–7 in SWAC play to finish in a three-way tie for fourth place. They lost in the first round of the SWAC tournament to Jackson State.

On March 23, it was announced that head coach Montez Robinson's contract would not be renewed, ending his 5-year tenure with the team. A month later, on April 23, it was announced that Prairie View A&M assistant coach Landon Bussie would be the Braves' next head coach.

== Roster ==
2020–21 Alcorn State Braves men's basketball team
Players
Coaches

Pos.	#	Name	Height	Weight	Year	Previous school	Hometown
G/F	0	Troymain Crosby	6 ft 4 in (1.93 m)	200 lb (91 kg)	Sr	Laurel High School	Laurel, Mississippi
G	1	Kurk Lee	5 ft 10 in (1.78 m)	150 lb (68 kg)	RS Jr	Drexel	Baltimore, Maryland
G	2	Myson Lowe	5 ft 10 in (1.78 m)	165 lb (75 kg)	Fr	Campbell High School	Smyrna, Georgia
G	3	David Pierce III	6 ft 3 in (1.91 m)	215 lb (98 kg)	Jr	Coastal Carolina	St. Petersburg, Florida
F	4	Anthony Fairley	6 ft 8 in (2.03 m)	190 lb (86 kg)	Sr	Coastal Alabama Community College Monroeville	Mobile, Alabama
F	5	Tyree Corbett	6 ft 7 in (2.01 m)	180 lb (82 kg)	Jr	Beaver County Community College	Philadelphia, Pennsylvania
F/C	10	Kobe Wilson	6 ft 9 in (2.06 m)	220 lb (100 kg)	RS Sr	North Cobb Christian School	Kennesaw, Georgia
G	11	Tajah Fraley	6 ft 5 in (1.96 m)	195 lb (88 kg)	Jr	Georgia Highlands College	Snellville, Georgia
G	12	Dekedran Thorn	6 ft 2 in (1.88 m)	175 lb (79 kg)	Jr	Pearland Dawson High School	Houston, Texas
G	13	Oddyst Walker	6 ft 3 in (1.91 m)	175 lb (79 kg)	Jr	Stephen F. Austin	Baton Rouge, Louisiana
F	15	Malik Hardmon	6 ft 6 in (1.98 m)	205 lb (93 kg)	Jr	Allen Community College	Chicago, Illinois
PG	20	Justin Thomas	5 ft 11 in (1.8 m)	185 lb (84 kg)	Sr	Morehead State	Indianapolis, Indiana
F	21	Mark Carter	6 ft 6 in (1.98 m)	195 lb (88 kg)	Sr	West Los Angeles College	Los Angeles, California
G/F	22	KJ Riley	6 ft 4 in (1.93 m)	190 lb (86 kg)	Jr	East Mississippi Community College	Greenville, Mississippi
G	24	Arne Morris	6 ft 3 in (1.91 m)	190 lb (86 kg)	Sr	Chattanooga State Community College	Raleigh, North Carolina
G	30	Byron Joshua	5 ft 10 in (1.78 m)	185 lb (84 kg)	Fr	Crescent City Christian School	Metairie, Louisiana
G	55	Jacoby Ross	5 ft 10 in (1.78 m)	165 lb (75 kg)	Sr	Alabama State	New Orleans, Louisiana

Head coach

- Landon Bussie (Xavier)

Assistant coach(es)

- Evans Davis (Mercer)
- Tyler Adams (Georgetown)

Legend

- (C) Team captain
- (S) Suspended
- (I) Ineligible
- (W) Walk-on
- Injured
- Current redshirt

Roster
Last update: February 4, 2021

== Schedule and results ==
Date time, TV	Rank^{#}	Opponent^{#}	Result	Record	Site (attendance) city, state
Non-conference regular season
November 25, 2020*; 2:30 pm		at UAB	L 50–99	0–1	Bartow Arena (906); Birmingham, AL
November 28, 2020*; 1:00 pm		at Kent State	Canceled		MAC Center; Kent, OH
December 1, 2020*; 6:00 pm		at Dayton	Canceled		UD Arena; Dayton, OH
December 3, 2020*; 7:00 pm, ESPN3		at Purdue Fort Wayne	Canceled		Hilliard Gates Sports Center; Fort Wayne, IN
December 5, 2020*		at Stephen F. Austin	Canceled		William R. Johnson Coliseum; Nacogdoches, TX
December 10, 2020*; 4:00 pm		at California Baptist	Canceled		CBU Events Center; Riverside, CA
December 13, 2021*		at Hawaii	Canceled		Stan Sheriff Center; Honolulu, HI
December 20, 2020*; 3:00 pm, ESPN+		at No. 6 Houston	L 55–88	0–2	Fertitta Center (1,859); Houston, TX
December 22, 2020*; 12:00 pm		at Liberty	L 65–108	0–3	Liberty Arena (250); Lynchburg, VA
December 27, 2020*; 3:00 pm, SECN		at Vanderbilt	L 59–87	0–4	Memorial Gymnasium (56); Nashville, TN
December 30, 2020*; 2:00 pm, ESPN+		at No. 2 Baylor	L 76–105	0–5	Ferrell Center (2,350); Waco, TX
SWAC regular season
January 2, 2020; 5:30 pm		Texas Southern	Canceled		Davey Whitney Complex; Lorman, MS
January 4, 2021; 7:30 pm		Prairie View A&M	Canceled		Davey Whitney Complex; Lorman, MS
January 9, 2021; 5:30 pm		at Jackson State	Canceled		Williams Assembly Center; Jackson, MS
January 12, 2021; 7:30 pm		at Grambling State	L 74–79	0–6 (0–1)	Fredrick C. Hobdy Assembly Center (600); Grambling, LA
January 16, 2021; 5:30 pm		Mississippi Valley State	W 71–59	1–6 (1–1)	Davey Whitney Complex (237); Lorman, MS
January 18, 2021; 3:30 pm		Arkansas–Pine Bluff	W 82–48	2–6 (2–1)	Davey Whitney Complex (349); Lorman, MS
January 23, 2021; 4:30 pm		at Alabama State	W 57–52	3–6 (3–1)	Dunn–Oliver Acadome (673); Montgomery, AL
January 25, 2021; 6:00 pm		at Alabama A&M	Canceled		Elmore Gymnasium; Huntsville, AL
January 30, 2021; 3:30 pm		Southern	L 59–76	3–7 (3–2)	Davey Whitney Complex (369); Lorman, MS
February 6, 2021; 3:30 pm		Jackson State	L 66–74	3–8 (3–3)	Davey Whitney Complex (425); Lorman, MS
February 8, 2021; 7:30 pm		Grambling State	L 62–67	3–9 (3–4)	Davey Whitney Complex (250); Lorman, MS
February 13, 2021; 4:30 pm		at Mississippi Valley State	W 70–56	4–9 (4–4)	Harrison HPER Complex (100); Itta Bena, MS
February 15, 2021; 2:45 pm		at Arkansas–Pine Bluff	Canceled		K. L. Johnson Complex; Pine Bluff, AR
February 20, 2021; 5:30 pm		Alabama State	Postponed		Davey Whitney Complex; Lorman, MS
February 22, 2021; 7:30 pm		Alabama A&M	W 65–52	5–9 (5–4)	Davey Whitney Complex; Lorman, MS
February 24, 2021; 4:30 pm		Alabama State rescheduled from February 20	W 68–59	6–9 (6–4)	Davey Whitney Complex; Lorman, MS
February 27, 2021; 5:30 pm		at Southern	L 75–89	6–10 (6–5)	F. G. Clark Center; Baton Rouge, LA
March 4, 2021; 7:30 pm		at Texas Southern	L 78–80	6–11 (6–6)	H&PE Arena; Houston, TX
March 6, 2021; 2:30 pm		at Prairie View A&M	L 69–81	6–12 (6–7)	William J. Nicks Building; Prairie View, TX
SWAC tournament
March 11, 2021; 2:00 pm, ESPN3	(6)	vs. (3) Texas Southern; Quarterfinals	L 55–78	6–13	Bartow Arena; Birmingham, AL
*Non-conference game. ^{#}Rankings from AP Poll. (#) Tournament seedings in parentheses. All times are in Central.
