= 2020–21 Alabama State Hornets basketball team =

American college basketball season

2020–21 Alabama State Hornets basketball
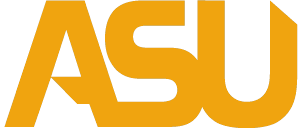
- Conference: Southwestern Athletic Conference
- Record: 4–14 (4–14 SWAC)
- Head coach: Mo Williams (1st season)
- Associate head coach: Trey Johnson
- Assistant coaches: Andrew Steele; Tyrone Levett
- Home arena: Dunn–Oliver Acadome

2020–21 SWAC men's basketball standings
	Conf.				Overall
Team	W		L	PCT	W		L	PCT
Prairie View A&M	13	–	0	1.000	16	–	5	.762
Jackson State	11	–	0	1.000	12	–	6	.667
Texas Southern †	10	–	3	.769	17	–	9	.654
Grambling State	9	–	6	.600	12	–	12	.500
Southern	8	–	6	.571	8	–	11	.421
Alcorn State	6	–	7	.462	6	–	13	.316
Alabama A&M*	4	–	9	.308	6	–	9	.400
Alabama State*	4	–	14	.222	4	–	14	.222
Arkansas–Pine Bluff	3	–	12	.200	4	–	21	.160
Mississippi Valley State	2	–	13	.133	2	–	22	.083
† 2021 SWAC tournament winner *Ineligible for postseason due to APR violations

The 2020–21 Alabama State Hornets basketball team represented Alabama State University in the 2020–21 NCAA Division I men's basketball season. The Hornets, led by first-year head coach Mo Williams, played their home games at the Dunn–Oliver Acadome in Montgomery, Alabama as members of the Southwestern Athletic Conference.

== Previous season ==
The Hornets finished the 2019–20 season 8–24, 7–11 in SWAC play to finish in seventh place. They lost in the first round of the SWAC tournament to Southern.

On March 27, head coach Lewis Jackson announced his resignation, ending his 15-year tenure with the Hornets. On May 12, it was announced that former NBA player Mo Williams would be named the school's next head coach.

== Roster ==
2020–21 Alabama State Hornets men's basketball team
Players
Coaches

Pos.	#	Name	Height	Weight	Year	Previous school	Hometown
F	0	Trace Young	6 ft 8 in (2.03 m)	179 lb (81 kg)	Jr	John A. Logan College	Owensboro, Kentucky
F	1	Brandon Battle	6 ft 8 in (2.03 m)	215 lb (98 kg)	Sr	Jacksonville College	Warren, Ohio
F	2	Jordan O'Neal	6 ft 6 in (1.98 m)	195 lb (88 kg)	So	Coahoma Community College	Mobile, Alabama
G	3	DJ Heath	6 ft 0 in (1.83 m)	185 lb (84 kg)	Sr	Shelton State	Anniston, Alabama
G	4	E.J. Clark	5 ft 11 in (1.8 m)	160 lb (73 kg)	Jr	Bossier Parish Community College	Dallas, Texas
G/F	5	Jordan Cousin	6 ft 7 in (2.01 m)	215 lb (98 kg)	Jr	John A. Logan College	Bowling Green, Kentucky
G	10	DJ Jackson	6 ft 2 in (1.88 m)	165 lb (75 kg)	Fr	Etiwanda High School	Los Angeles, California
G	11	LaTrell Tate	6 ft 0 in (1.83 m)	165 lb (75 kg)	So	Bevill State Community College	Marietta, Georgia
G	12	Malik Smiley	6 ft 4 in (1.93 m)	180 lb (82 kg)	RS Fr	IMG Academy	Birmingham, Alabama
G	13	Kareem Clark	6 ft 3 in (1.91 m)	185 lb (84 kg)	Jr	South Mountain Community College	Sacramento, California
G	15	Kevion Stewart	6 ft 3 in (1.91 m)	190 lb (86 kg)	RS Sr	SIU Edwardsville	Memphis, Tennessee
G	20	Kenny Strawbridge	6 ft 4 in (1.93 m)	195 lb (88 kg)	RS So	Western Nebraska	Rockford, Illinois
F	21	Mike Stone	6 ft 9 in (2.06 m)	260 lb (118 kg)	Sr	State Fair Community College	Brooklyn, New York
G	30	Christopher Dumas	6 ft 0 in (1.83 m)	175 lb (79 kg)	RS Fr	Kipp Atlanta Collegiate	Atlanta, Georgia
F	35	Tyrese Robinson	6 ft 8 in (2.03 m)	220 lb (100 kg)	Sr	Beaver County Community College	Pittsburgh, Pennsylvania

Head coach

- Mo Williams (Alabama)

Assistant coach(es)

- Trey Johnson (Jackson State)
- Andrew Steele (Alabama)
- Tyrone Levett (Alabama State)

Legend

- (C) Team captain
- (S) Suspended
- (I) Ineligible
- (W) Walk-on
- Injured
- Current redshirt

Roster
Last update: February 4, 2021

== Schedule and results ==
Date time, TV	Rank^{#}	Opponent^{#}	Result	Record	Site (attendance) city, state
SWAC regular season
January 2, 2021; 4:30 pm		Grambling State	L 49–66	0–1 (0–1)	Dunn–Oliver Acadome; Montgomery, AL
January 4, 2021; 8:00 pm, ESPNU		Jackson State	L 44–60	0–2 (0–2)	Dunn–Oliver Acadome (276); Montgomery, AL
January 9, 2021; 5:00 pm		at Arkansas–Pine Bluff	L 82–91	0–3 (0–3)	K. L. Johnson Complex (342); Pine Bluff, AR
January 12, 2021; 4:30 pm		at Mississippi Valley State	W 64–51	1–3 (1–3)	Harrison HPER Complex; Itta Bena, MS
January 16, 2021; 3:00 pm		at Alabama A&M	L 63–70	1–4 (1–4)	Elmore Gymnasium (275); Huntsville, AL
January 23, 2021; 4:30 pm		Alcorn State	L 52–57	1–5 (1–5)	Dunn–Oliver Acadome (673); Montgomery, AL
January 25, 2021; 8:00 pm		Southern	W 66–64	2–5 (2–5)	Dunn–Oliver Acadome (1,499); Montgomery, AL
January 30, 2021; 7:30 pm		at Texas Southern	L 73–80	2–6 (2–6)	H&PE Arena (500); Houston, TX
February 1, 2021; 7:30 pm		at Prairie View A&M	L 63–87	2–7 (2–7)	William J. Nicks Building (700); Prairie View, TX
February 6, 2021; 4:30 pm		Arkansas–Pine Bluff	W 73–67	3–7 (3–7)	Dunn–Oliver Acadome (864); Montgomery, AL
February 8, 2021; 8:00 pm		Mississippi Valley State	L 65–68	3–8 (3–8)	Dunn–Oliver Acadome (987); Montgomery, AL
February 13, 2021; 4:30 pm		Alabama A&M	W 72–58	4–8 (4–8)	Dunn–Oliver Acadome (1,500); Montgomery, AL
February 20, 2021; 5:30 pm		at Alcorn State	Postponed		Williams Assembly Center; Jackson, MS
February 22, 2021; 7:30 pm		at Southern	L 66–75	4–9 (4–9)	F. G. Clark Center (1,525); Baton Rouge, LA
February 24, 2021; 5:30 pm		at Alcorn State; Rescheduled from February 20	L 59–68	4–10 (4–10)	Williams Assembly Center; Jackson, MS
February 27, 2021; 4:30 pm		Texas Southern	L 76–86	4–11 (4–11)	Dunn–Oliver Acadome; Montgomery, AL
March 1, 2021; 8:00 pm		Prairie View A&M	L 67–70	4–12 (4–12)	Dunn–Oliver Acadome; Montgomery, AL
March 4, 2021; 7:30 pm		at Grambling State	L 68–91	4–13 (4–13)	Fredrick C. Hobdy Assembly Center; Grambling, LA
March 6, 2021; 5:30 pm		at Jackson State	L 54–79	4–14 (4–14)	Williams Assembly Center; Jackson, MS
*Non-conference game. ^{#}Rankings from AP Poll. (#) Tournament seedings in parentheses. All times are in Central.
