= 2020–21 Arkansas–Pine Bluff Golden Lions men's basketball team =

American college basketball season

2020–21 Arkansas–Pine Bluff Golden Lions men's basketball
- Conference: Southwestern Athletic Conference
- Record: 4–21 (3–12 SWAC)
- Head coach: George Ivory (13th season)
- Assistant coaches: Kenneth Broyles; Richard Cannon; Cary Shelton
- Home arena: K. L. Johnson Complex

2020–21 SWAC men's basketball standings
	Conf.				Overall
Team	W		L	PCT	W		L	PCT
Prairie View A&M	13	–	0	1.000	16	–	5	.762
Jackson State	11	–	0	1.000	12	–	6	.667
Texas Southern †	10	–	3	.769	17	–	9	.654
Grambling State	9	–	6	.600	12	–	12	.500
Southern	8	–	6	.571	8	–	11	.421
Alcorn State	6	–	7	.462	6	–	13	.316
Alabama A&M*	4	–	9	.308	6	–	9	.400
Alabama State*	4	–	14	.222	4	–	14	.222
Arkansas–Pine Bluff	3	–	12	.200	4	–	21	.160
Mississippi Valley State	2	–	13	.133	2	–	22	.083
† 2021 SWAC tournament winner *Ineligible for postseason due to APR violations

The 2020–21 Arkansas–Pine Bluff Golden Lions men's basketball team represented the University of Arkansas at Pine Bluff in the 2020–21 NCAA Division I men's basketball season. The Golden Lions, led by 13th-year head coach George Ivory, played their home games at the K. L. Johnson Complex in Pine Bluff, Arkansas as members of the Southwestern Athletic Conference.

== Previous season ==
The Golden Lions finished the 2019–20 season 4–26, 3–15 in SWAC play to finish in a tie for ninth place. They failed to qualify for the SWAC tournament.

== Roster ==
2020–21 Arkansas–Pine Bluff Golden Lions men's basketball team
Players
Coaches

Pos.	#	Name	Height	Weight	Year	Previous school	Hometown
G	0	Kshun Stokes	6 ft 2 in (1.88 m)	175 lb (79 kg)	So	Headland HS	Headland, Alabama
G	1	Jalen Lynn	6 ft 1 in (1.85 m)	170 lb (77 kg)	Jr	Mid-South CC	Collierville, Tennessee
F	2	Travonta Doolittle	6 ft 4 in (1.93 m)	175 lb (79 kg)	Jr	Itawamba CC	Hughes, Arkansas
F	3	Markedric Bell	6 ft 8 in (2.03 m)	190 lb (86 kg)	Sr	East Mississippi CC	Starkville, Mississippi
G	4	Joshuwan Johnson	5 ft 9 in (1.75 m)	160 lb (73 kg)	Jr	Glendale CC	Phoenix, Arizona
F	12	Terrance Banyard	6 ft 8 in (2.03 m)	215 lb (98 kg)	Sr	Destiny HS	Milwaukee, Wisconsin
F	13	Robert Boyd	6 ft 6 in (1.98 m)	205 lb (93 kg)	RS Jr	Coahoma CC	Memphis, Tennessee
G	14	George Ivory III	6 ft 3 in (1.91 m)	175 lb (79 kg)	Fr	Watson Chapel HS	Pine Bluff, Arkansas
F	15	Alvin Stredic Jr.	6 ft 9 in (2.06 m)	210 lb (95 kg)	So	Van Vleck HS	Bay City, Texas
G	21	Shaun Doss Jr.	6 ft 5 in (1.96 m)	185 lb (84 kg)	RS Jr	Iowa Western CC	Marion, Arkansas
F	22	Omar Parchman	6 ft 9 in (2.06 m)	215 lb (98 kg)	Jr	Rend Lake College	Forrest City, Arkansas
G	23	Dequan Morris	6 ft 4 in (1.93 m)	180 lb (82 kg)	Sr	Coahoma CC	Pine Bluff, Arkansas
F	34	Daveon Doolittle	6 ft 7 in (2.01 m)	180 lb (82 kg)	Fr	West Memphis HS	West Memphis, Arkansas
G	40	Nicholas Jones	6 ft 1 in (1.85 m)	175 lb (79 kg)	Sr	Central Baptist College	Little Rock, Arkansas
F	52	Kobe Hargrove	6 ft 5 in (1.96 m)	170 lb (77 kg)	Fr	White Hall HS	White Hall, Arkansas

Head coach

- George Ivory (Mississippi Valley State)

Assistant coach(es)

- Kenneth Broyles (Arkansas–Pine Bluff)
- Richard Cannon (Mississippi Valley State)
- Cary Shelton (Arkansas State)

Legend

- (C) Team captain
- (S) Suspended
- (I) Ineligible
- (W) Walk-on
- Injured
- Current redshirt

Roster
Last update: January 14, 2021

== Schedule and results ==
Date time, TV	Rank^{#}	Opponent^{#}	Result	Record	Site (attendance) city, state
Non-conference regular season
November 25, 2020*; 9:00 pm, FS1		at Marquette	L 57–99	0–1	Fiserv Forum; Milwaukee, WI
November 27, 2020*; 8:00 pm, BTN		at No. 7 Wisconsin	L 58–92	0–2	Kohl Center; Madison, WI
November 29, 2020*; 12:00 pm, ESPN+		at Iowa State	L 63–80	0–3	Hilton Coliseum; Ames, IA
December 2, 2020*; 8:00 pm, BTN		at Northwestern	L 49–92	0–4	Welsh–Ryan Arena; Evanston, IL
December 5, 2020*; 7:00 pm, FSMW/ESPN+		at Saint Louis	L 54–107	0–5	Chaifetz Arena; St. Louis, MO
December 9, 2020*; 6:00 pm, ESPN+		at Arkansas State	W 75–74	1–5	First National Bank Arena; Jonesboro, AR
December 12, 2020*; 1:00 pm, ESPN+		at Tulane	L 56–67	1–6	Devlin Fieldhouse (100); New Orleans, LA
December 15, 2020*; 7:00 pm, YouTube		at North Texas	L 56–81	1–7	UNT Coliseum (1,211); Denton, TX
December 21, 2020*; 7:00 pm, ESPN+		at No. 2 Baylor	L 42–99	1–8	Ferrell Center (2,350); Waco, TX
SWAC regular season
January 2, 2021; 5:00 pm, UAPB Sports Network		Mississippi Valley State	W 92–52	2–8 (1–0)	K. L. Johnson Complex (207); Pine Bluff, AR
January 9, 2021; 5:00 pm		Alabama State	W 91–82	3–8 (2–0)	K. L. Johnson Complex (342); Pine Bluff, AR
January 11, 2021; 7:00 pm, UAPB Sports Network		Alabama A&M	Canceled due to COVID-19		K. L. Johnson Complex; Pine Bluff, AR
January 16, 2021; 4:30 pm		at Southern	L 53–88	3–9 (2–1)	F. G. Clark Center (1,286); Baton Rouge, LA
January 18, 2021; 7:30 pm		at Alcorn State	L 48–82	3–10 (2–2)	Davey Whitney Complex (349); Lorman, MS
January 23, 2021; 5:00 pm, UAPB Sports Network		Texas Southern	L 57–66	3–11 (2–3)	K. L. Johnson Complex; Pine Bluff, AR
January 25, 2021; 8:00 pm, UAPB Sports Network		Prairie View A&M	L 56–73	3–12 (2–4)	K. L. Johnson Complex; Pine Bluff, AR
January 30, 2021; 5:30 pm		at Grambling State	L 71–74	3–13 (2–5)	Fredrick C. Hobdy Assembly Center; Grambling, LA
February 1, 2021; 7:30 pm		at Jackson State	L 55–63	3–14 (2–6)	Williams Assembly Center; Jackson, MS
February 6, 2021; 4:30 pm		at Alabama State	L 67–73	3–15 (2–7)	Dunn–Oliver Acadome; Montgomery, AL
February 8, 2021; 7:30 pm		at Alabama A&M	L 55–56	3–16 (2–8)	Elmore Gymnasium; Huntsville, AL
February 13, 2021; 5:00 pm, UAPB Sports Network		Southern	L 71–73	3–17 (2–9)	K. L. Johnson Complex; Pine Bluff, AR
February 17, 2021; 7:00 pm, UAPB Sports Network		Alcorn State	Canceled due to COVID-19		K. L. Johnson Complex; Pine Bluff, AR
February 21, 2021; 7:30 pm		at Texas Southern	Postponed due to weather		H&PE Arena; Houston, TX
February 23, 2021; 7:30 pm		at Prairie View A&M	L 56–72	3–18 (2–10)	William J. Nicks Building; Prairie View, TX
February 25, 2021; 7:30 pm		at Texas Southern; Rescheduled from February 21	L 65–79	3–19 (2–11)	H&PE Arena; Houston, TX
February 27, 2021; 8:00 pm, UAPB Sports Network		Grambling State	Canceled due to COVID-19		K. L. Johnson Complex; Pine Bluff, AR
March 1, 2021; 8:00 pm, UAPB Sports Network		Jackson State	L 58–64 ^{OT}	3–20 (2–12)	K. L. Johnson Complex; Pine Bluff, AR
March 5, 2021; 7:00 pm		at Mississippi Valley State	W 82–59	4–20 (3–12)	Harrison HPER Complex; Itta Bena, MS
March 6, 2021; 4:00 pm		at Mississippi Valley State	Canceled due to scheduling changes		Harrison HPER Complex; Itta Bena, MS
SWAC tournament
Mar 10, 2021; 2:00 pm, ESPN3	(7)	vs. (2) Jackson State; Quarterfinals	L 62–74	4–21	Bartow Arena; Birmingham, Alabama
*Non-conference game. ^{#}Rankings from AP Poll. (#) Tournament seedings in parentheses. All times are in Central.
