= 2020–21 Grambling State Tigers men's basketball team =

American college basketball season

2020–21 Grambling State Tigers men's basketball
- Conference: Southwestern Athletic Conference
- Record: 11–11 (9–6 SWAC)
- Head coach: Donte Jackson (4th season)
- Assistant coaches: Winston Hines; Demetrius Moore; Kyle Jones
- Home arena: Fredrick C. Hobdy Assembly Center

2020–21 SWAC men's basketball standings
	Conf.				Overall
Team	W		L	PCT	W		L	PCT
Prairie View A&M	13	–	0	1.000	16	–	5	.762
Jackson State	11	–	0	1.000	12	–	6	.667
Texas Southern †	10	–	3	.769	17	–	9	.654
Grambling State	9	–	6	.600	12	–	12	.500
Southern	8	–	6	.571	8	–	11	.421
Alcorn State	6	–	7	.462	6	–	13	.316
Alabama A&M*	4	–	9	.308	6	–	9	.400
Alabama State*	4	–	14	.222	4	–	14	.222
Arkansas–Pine Bluff	3	–	12	.200	4	–	21	.160
Mississippi Valley State	2	–	13	.133	2	–	22	.083
† 2021 SWAC tournament winner *Ineligible for postseason due to APR violations

The 2020–21 Grambling State Tigers men's basketball team represented Grambling State University in the 2020–21 NCAA Division I men's basketball season. The Tigers, led by fourth-year head coach Donte Jackson, played their home games at the Fredrick C. Hobdy Assembly Center in Grambling, Louisiana as members of the Southwestern Athletic Conference (SWAC).

== Previous season ==
The Tigers finished the 2019–20 season 17–15, 11–7 in SWAC play, to finish in a three-way tie for fourth place. They lost in the quarterfinals of the SWAC tournament to Texas Southern.

== Roster ==
2020–21 Grambling State Tigers men's basketball team
Players
Coaches

Pos.	#	Name	Height	Weight	Year	Previous school	Hometown
G/F	0	Cameron Woodall	6 ft 7 in (2.01 m)	225 lb (102 kg)	Jr	Copiah–Lincoln Community College	Raymond, MS
G	1	Dwayne Walker	6 ft 3 in (1.91 m)	190 lb (86 kg)	RS So	Chipola College	Milwaukee, WI
G	2	Zahad Munford	6 ft 3 in (1.91 m)	170 lb (77 kg)	So	Carter High School	Dallas, TX
G	3	Peyton Taylor	6 ft 4 in (1.93 m)	200 lb (91 kg)	Jr	Hinds Community College	Cleveland, MS
G/F	4	Reyhan Cobb	6 ft 9 in (2.06 m)	185 lb (84 kg)	Jr	National Park College	Atlanta, GA
G	5	Tra'Michael Moton	6 ft 1 in (1.85 m)	170 lb (77 kg)	So	Woodlawn High School	Shreveport, LA
G	10	Trevell Cunningham	6 ft 0 in (1.83 m)	180 lb (82 kg)	Sr	Triton College	Chicago, IL
G	11	Kelton Edwards	6 ft 6 in (1.98 m)	195 lb (88 kg)	Sr	Marshalltown Community College	Dallas, TX
G	12	Cameron Christon	6 ft 6 in (1.98 m)	190 lb (86 kg)	RS Jr	Boise State	Allen, TX
G	20	Isreal Edwards	6 ft 1 in (1.85 m)	175 lb (79 kg)	Fr	Green Oaks High School	Shreveport, LA
F	21	Terreon Randolph	6 ft 8 in (2.03 m)	220 lb (100 kg)	Sr	Temple College	Dallas, TX
G	22	Prince Moss	6 ft 7 in (2.01 m)	180 lb (82 kg)	RS Sr	Iowa Central Community College	Bessemer, AL
F	23	Sarion McGee	6 ft 8 in (2.03 m)	255 lb (116 kg)	RS So	State Fair Community College	Milwaukee, WI
F	24	Carte'Are Gordon	6 ft 9 in (2.06 m)	240 lb (109 kg)	RS So	Northwest Florida State College	St. Louis, MO
F	30	Brian Thomas	6 ft 9 in (2.06 m)	255 lb (116 kg)	Sr	Florida Gulf Coast	Kennesaw, GA
F	32	RJ Gladney	6 ft 6 in (1.98 m)	200 lb (91 kg)	Jr	Angelo State	DeRidder, LA
F	33	Robert Johnson	6 ft 5 in (1.96 m)	230 lb (104 kg)	RS Jr	Kishwaukee College	Joliet, IL

Head coach

- Donte Jackson (Central State)

Assistant coach(es)

- Winston Hines (Stillman)
- Demetrius Moore (Stillman)
- Kyle Jones (Arkansas–Pine Bluff)

Legend

- (C) Team captain
- (S) Suspended
- (I) Ineligible
- (W) Walk-on
- Injured
- Current redshirt

Roster
Last update: January 6, 2021

== Schedule and results ==
Date time, TV	Rank^{#}	Opponent^{#}	Result	Record	Site (attendance) city, state
Non-conference regular season
November 25, 2020*; 8:00 p.m., ESPN3		at Grand Canyon	L 53–69	0–1	GCU Arena (285); Phoenix, AZ
November 27, 2020*; 4:00 p.m.		at Arizona; Southwest Classic	L 55–74	0–2	McKale Center; Tucson, AZ
December 3, 2020*; 7:00 p.m.		East Texas Baptist	W 68–59	1–2	Fredrick C. Hobdy Assembly Center (220); Grambling, LA
December 6, 2020*; 1:00 p.m., ESPNU		at No. 17 Texas Tech	L 40–81	1–3	United Supermarkets Arena (3,283); Lubbock, TX
December 12, 2020*; 7:00 p.m.		at Incarnate Word	Canceled due to COVID-19		McDermott Center; San Antonio, TX
December 16, 2020*; 6:00 p.m., ESPN+		at Louisiana–Monroe	W 78–61	2–3	Fant–Ewing Coliseum (1,022); Monroe, LA
December 19, 2020*; 1:00 p.m., ESPN+		at Tulane	L 65–77	2–4	Devlin Fieldhouse (100); New Orleans, LA
December 23, 2020*; 3:00 p.m.		Southeastern Louisiana	L 70–77	2–5	Fredrick C. Hobdy Assembly Center (100); Grambling, LA
December 28, 2020*; 1:00 p.m.		Incarnate Word	Canceled due to COVID-19		Fredrick C. Hobdy Assembly Center; Grambling, LA
SWAC regular season
January 2, 2021; 4:30 p.m.		at Alabama State	W 66–49	3–5 (1–0)	Dunn–Oliver Acadome; Montgomery, AL
January 4, 2021; 7:30 p.m.		at Alabama A&M	Postponed due to COVID-19		Elmore Gymnasium; Huntsville, AL
January 9, 2021; 5:30 p.m.		Southern	L 55–61	3–6 (1–1)	Fredrick C. Hobdy Assembly Center (708); Grambling, LA
January 11, 2021; 7:30 p.m.		Alcorn State	W 79–74	4–6 (2–1)	Fredrick C. Hobdy Assembly Center (600); Grambling, LA
January 16, 2020; 7:30 p.m.		at Texas Southern	W 78–72	5–6 (3–1)	H&PE Arena; Houston, TX
January 18, 2021; 7:30 p.m.		at Prairie View A&M	L 50–59	5–7 (3–2)	William J. Nicks Building (975); Prairie View, TX
January 23, 2021; 5:30 p.m.		Jackson State	L 61–75	5–8 (3–3)	Fredrick C. Hobdy Assembly Center (706); Grambling, LA
January 30, 2021; 5:30 p.m.		Arkansas–Pine Bluff	W 74–71	6–8 (4–3)	Fredrick C. Hobdy Assembly Center (780); Grambling, LA
February 1, 2021; 7:30 p.m.		Mississippi Valley State	W 85–72	7–8 (5–3)	Fredrick C. Hobdy Assembly Center (740); Grambling, LA
February 6, 2021; 5:30 p.m.		at Southern	W 72–69	8–8 (6–3)	F. G. Clark Center (2,375); Baton Rouge, LA
February 8, 2021; 7:30 p.m.		at Alcorn State	W 67–62	9–8 (7–3)	Davey Whitney Complex (250); Lorman, MS
February 13, 2021; 5:30 p.m.		Texas Southern	L 73–75	9–9 (7–4)	Fredrick C. Hobdy Assembly Center (450); Grambling, LA
February 15, 2021; 7:30 p.m.		Prairie View A&M	Postponed due to weather		Fredrick C. Hobdy Assembly Center; Grambling, LA
February 22, 2021; 5:30 p.m., NBA TV		at Jackson State	L 59–63	9–10 (7–5)	Williams Assembly Center; Jackson, MS
February 27, 2021; 7:30 p.m.		at Arkansas–Pine Bluff	Postponed due to COVID-19		K. L. Johnson Complex; Pine Bluff, AR
March 1, 2021; 7:30 p.m.		at Mississippi Valley State	W 67–63	9–11 (7–6)	Harrison HPER Complex (162); Itta Bena, MS
March 4, 2021; 7:30 p.m.		Alabama State	W 91–68	10–11 (8–6)	Fredrick C. Hobdy Assembly Center (387); Grambling, LA
March 6, 2021; 8:00 p.m.		Alabama A&M	W 80–72	11–11 (9–6)	Fredrick C. Hobdy Assembly Center (700); Grambling, LA
SWAC tournament
March 11, 2021; 8:30 p.m., ESPN3	(4)	vs. (5) Southern	W 72–67 ^{OT}	12–11	Bartow Arena (450); Birmingham, AL
March 11, 2021; 8:30 p.m., ESPN3	(4)	vs. (1) Prairie View A&M; Semifinals	L 63–75	12–12	Bartow Arena (222); Birmingham, AL
*Non-conference game. ^{#}Rankings from AP poll. (#) Tournament seedings in parentheses. All times are in Central.
