= 2020–21 Mississippi Valley State Delta Devils basketball team =

American college basketball season

2020–21 Mississippi Valley State Delta Devils basketball
- Conference: Southwestern Athletic Conference
- Record: 2–22 (2–13 SWAC)
- Head coach: Lindsey Hunter (2nd season)
- Assistant coaches: Alan Perry; Will Vance; Darius Rice
- Home arena: Harrison HPER Complex

2020–21 SWAC men's basketball standings
| | Conf. | | | | Overall |
| Team | W | | L | PCT | W | | L | PCT |
|---|---|---|---|---|---|---|---|---|
| Prairie View A&M | 13 | – | 0 | 1.000 | 16 | – | 5 | .762 |
| Jackson State | 11 | – | 0 | 1.000 | 12 | – | 6 | .667 |
| Texas Southern † | 10 | – | 3 | .769 | 17 | – | 9 | .654 |
| Grambling State | 9 | – | 6 | .600 | 12 | – | 12 | .500 |
| Southern | 8 | – | 6 | .571 | 8 | – | 11 | .421 |
| Alcorn State | 6 | – | 7 | .462 | 6 | – | 13 | .316 |
| Alabama A&M* | 4 | – | 9 | .308 | 6 | – | 9 | .400 |
| Alabama State* | 4 | – | 14 | .222 | 4 | – | 14 | .222 |
| Arkansas–Pine Bluff | 3 | – | 12 | .200 | 4 | – | 21 | .160 |
| Mississippi Valley State | 2 | – | 13 | .133 | 2 | – | 22 | .083 |
† 2021 SWAC tournament winner *Ineligible for postseason due to APR violations

The 2020–21 Mississippi Valley State Delta Devils basketball team represented Mississippi Valley State University during the 2020–21 NCAA Division I men's basketball season. The team was led by second-year head coach Lindsey Hunter, and played their home games at Harrison HPER Complex in Itta Bena, Mississippi as a member of the Southwestern Athletic Conference. In March, they were the worst ranked team in NCAA Division I according to Kenpom, with the least efficient offense and defense.

== Roster ==
2020–21 Mississippi Valley State Delta Devils men's basketball team
Players
Coaches

| Pos. | # | Name | Height | Weight | Year | Hometown |
|---|---|---|---|---|---|---|
| G | 0 | Treylan Smith | 6 ft 4 in (1.93 m) | 195 lb (88 kg) | Fr | Richton, Mississippi |
| G | 1 | Alexander Perry | 6 ft 6 in (1.98 m) | 195 lb (88 kg) | Sr | Tallahassee, Florida |
| G | 2 | Kam'Ron Cunningham | 6 ft 7 in (2.01 m) | 205 lb (93 kg) | Jr | Greenville, South Carolina |
| G | 3 | Caleb Hunter | 5 ft 10 in (1.78 m) | 185 lb (84 kg) | So | Plymouth, Michigan |
| G | 5 | Quavon Blackwood | 6 ft 0 in (1.83 m) | 200 lb (91 kg) | Jr | Hyattsville, Maryland |
| G | 10 | Devin Gordon | 6 ft 4 in (1.93 m) | 210 lb (95 kg) | Fr | Powder Springs, Georgia |
| G | 11 | Terry Collins | 6 ft 3 in (1.91 m) | 180 lb (82 kg) | Jr | Kenner, Louisiana |
| G | 12 | Keiondre Jefferson | 6 ft 6 in (1.98 m) | 190 lb (86 kg) | RS Sr | Camden, Arkansas |
| F | 13 | Ronald Williams | 6 ft 8 in (2.03 m) | 215 lb (98 kg) | Jr | Killeen, Texas |
| G | 15 | Jordan Johnson | 6 ft 3 in (1.91 m) | 175 lb (79 kg) | So | Covington, Tennessee |
| F | 21 | Quoiren Waldon | 6 ft 9 in (2.06 m) | 215 lb (98 kg) | Fr | Atlanta, Georgia |
| F | 23 | Donalson Fanord | 6 ft 9 in (2.06 m) | 225 lb (102 kg) | So | Port-au-Prince, Haiti |
| C | 32 | Leeandre Howard | 7 ft 1 in (2.16 m) | 250 lb (113 kg) | Fr | Los Angeles, California |

Head coach

- Lindsey Hunter (Jackson State)

Assistant coach(es)

- Alan Perry (Mississippi State)
- Will Vance (Sam Houston State)
- Darius Rice (Miami (FL))

Legend

- (C) Team captain
- (S) Suspended
- (I) Ineligible
- (W) Walk-on
- Injured
- Current redshirt

Roster
Last update: March 30, 2021

== Schedule and results ==
| Date time, TV | Rank^{#} | Opponent^{#} | Result | Record | Site (attendance) city, state |
Non-conference regular season
| November 25, 2020*; 6:30 p.m., SECN+ | | at Arkansas | L 62–142 | 0–1 | Bud Walton Arena (4,400); Fayetteville, AR |
| November 26, 2020*; 7:00 p.m. | | at North Texas | L 62–116 | 0–2 | UNT Coliseum (1,206); Denton, TX |
| November 28, 2020*; 3:00 p.m. | | at Wyoming | L 61–97 | 0–3 | Arena-Auditorium (1,216); Laramie, WY |
| December 1, 2020*; 8:00 p.m. | | at Grand Canyon | L 49–88 | 0–4 | GCU Arena (254); Phoenix, AZ |
| December 5, 2020*; 7:00 p.m. | | at Missouri State | Cancelled | | JQH Arena; Springfield, MO |
| December 6, 2020*; 2:00 p.m., ESPN+ | | at Western Kentucky | L 69–96 | 0–5 | E. A. Diddle Arena (1,024); Bowling Green, KY |
| December 8, 2020*; 7:00 p.m. | | at Memphis | L 57–94 | 0–6 | FedExForum (2,478); Memphis, TN |
| December 13, 2020*; 1:00 p.m. | | at Vanderbilt | L 41–84 | 0–7 | Memorial Gymnasium (0); Nashville, TN |
| December 18, 2020* | | at Ohio | Cancelled | | Convocation Center; Athens, OH |
| December 21, 2020*; 8:00 p.m., SECN | | at Mississippi State | L 58–87 | 0–8 | Humphrey Coliseum (1,000); Starkville, MS |
SWAC regular season
| January 2, 2021; 5:00 p.m. | | at Arkansas–Pine Bluff | L 52–92 | 0–9 (0–1) | K. L. Johnson Complex (0); Pine Bluff, AR |
| January 9, 2021 | | Alabama A&M | Canceled | | Harrison HPER Complex; Itta Bena, MS |
| January 12, 2021; 4:30 p.m. | | Alabama State | L 51–64 | 0–10 (0–2) | Harrison HPER Complex; Itta Bena, MS |
| January 16, 2021; 5:30 p.m. | | at Alcorn State | L 59–71 | 0–11 (0–3) | Davey Whitney Complex; Lorman, MS |
| January 18, 2021; 4:30 p.m. | | at Southern | L 61–102 | 0–12 (0–4) | F. G. Clark Center; Baton Rouge, LA |
| January 23, 2021; 3:00 p.m. | | Prairie View A&M | L 31–77 | 0–13 (0–5) | Harrison HPER Complex; Itta Bena, MS |
| January 25, 2021 | | Texas Southern | Postponed | | Harrison HPER Complex; Itta Bena, MS |
| January 30, 2021; 5:30 p.m. | | at Jackson State | L 53–106 | 0–14 (0–6) | Williams Assembly Center; Jackson, MS |
| February 1, 2021; 7:30 p.m. | | at Grambling State | L 72–85 | 0–15 (0–7) | Fredrick C. Hobdy Assembly Center; Grambling, LA |
| February 6, 2021; 7:30 p.m. | | at Alabama A&M | L 58–93 | 0–16 (0–8) | Elmore Gymnasium; Huntsville, AL |
| February 8, 2021; 7:30 p.m. | | at Alabama State | W 68–65 | 1–16 (1–8) | Dunn–Oliver Acadome; Montgomery, AL |
| February 13, 2021; 4:30 p.m. | | Alcorn State | L 56–70 | 1–17 (1–9) | Harrison HPER Complex; Itta Bena, MS |
| February 17, 2021; 7:30 p.m. | | Southern | Canceled | | Harrison HPER Complex; Itta Bena, MS |
| February 21, 2021; 7:30 p.m. | | at Prairie View A&M | Postponed | | William Nicks Building; Prairie View, TX |
| February 23, 2021; 7:30 p.m. | | at Texas Southern; Moved from March 3 | L 45–82 | 1–18 (1–10) | Health and Physical Education Arena; Houston, TX |
| February 24, 2021; 3:00 p.m. | | Texas Southern; Rescheduled from January 25 | Canceled | | Harrison HPER Complex; Itta Bena, MS |
| February 25, 2021; 7:30 p.m. | | at Prairie View A&M; Rescheduled from February 21 | L 62–82 | 1–19 (1–11) | William Nicks Building; Prairie View, TX |
| February 27, 2021; 4:30 p.m. | | Jackson State | L 54–68 | 1–20 (1–12) | Harrison HPER Complex; Itta Bena, MS |
| March 1, 2021; 7:30 p.m. | | Grambling State | W 67–63 | 2–20 (2–12) | Harrison HPER Complex (162); Itta Bena, MS |
| March 3, 2021 | | at Texas Southern | Canceled | | Health and Physical Education Arena; Houston, TX |
| March 5, 2021; 7:00 p.m. | | Arkansas–Pine Bluff; Moved from March 5 | L 59–82 | 2–21 (2–13) | Harrison HPER Complex (260); Itta Bena, MS |
| March 6, 2021; 2:30 p.m. | | Arkansas–Pine Bluff | Canceled | | Harrison HPER Complex; Itta Bena, MS |
SWAC tournament
| March 10, 2021; 8:30 pm, ESPN3 | (8) | at (1) Prairie View A&M; Quarterfinals | L 64–91 | 2–22 | Bartow Arena; Birmingham, AL |
*Non-conference game. ^{#}Rankings from AP Poll. (#) Tournament seedings in parentheses. All times are in Central Time.
