= 2020–21 Southern Jaguars basketball team =

American college basketball season

2020–21 Southern Jaguars basketball
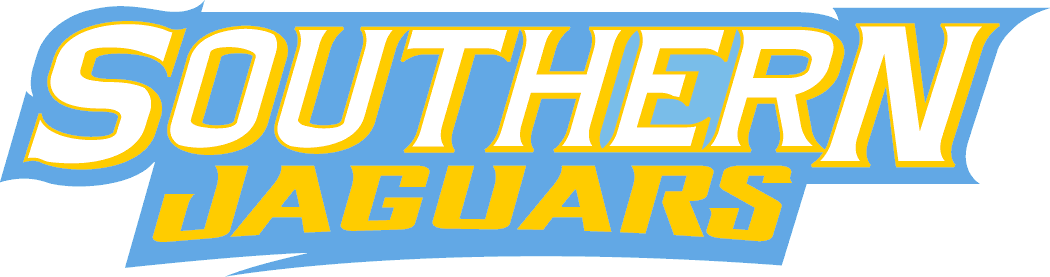
- Conference: Southwestern Athletic Conference
- Record: 8–11 (8–6 SWAC)
- Head coach: Sean Woods (3rd season)
- Assistant coaches: Ryan Price; Pedro Cipriano; Jethro Hillman; Martiese Morones
- Home arena: F. G. Clark Center

2020–21 SWAC men's basketball standings
	Conf.				Overall
Team	W		L	PCT	W		L	PCT
Prairie View A&M	13	–	0	1.000	16	–	5	.762
Jackson State	11	–	0	1.000	12	–	6	.667
Texas Southern †	10	–	3	.769	17	–	9	.654
Grambling State	9	–	6	.600	12	–	12	.500
Southern	8	–	6	.571	8	–	11	.421
Alcorn State	6	–	7	.462	6	–	13	.316
Alabama A&M*	4	–	9	.308	6	–	9	.400
Alabama State*	4	–	14	.222	4	–	14	.222
Arkansas–Pine Bluff	3	–	12	.200	4	–	21	.160
Mississippi Valley State	2	–	13	.133	2	–	22	.083
† 2021 SWAC tournament winner *Ineligible for postseason due to APR violations

The 2020–21 Southern Jaguars basketball team represented Southern University in the 2020–21 NCAA Division I men's basketball season. The Jaguars, led by third-year head coach Sean Woods, played their home games at the F. G. Clark Center in Baton Rouge, Louisiana as members of the Southwestern Athletic Conference (SWAC).

== Previous season ==
The Jaguars finished the 2019–20 season 17–15, 13–5 in SWAC play, to finish in second place. They defeated Alabama State in the quarterfinals of the SWAC tournament, and were set to face Texas Southern in the semifinals until the tournament was cancelled amid the COVID-19 pandemic.

== Roster ==
2020–21 Southern Jaguars men's basketball team
Players
Coaches

Pos.	#	Name	Height	Weight	Year	Previous school	Hometown
F	0	Terrell Jr. Williams	6 ft 5 in (1.96 m)	200 lb (91 kg)	RS Fr	Mansfield High School	Arlington, TX
G	1/32	Ahsante Shivers	6 ft 4 in (1.93 m)	210 lb (95 kg)	RS Sr	Siena	Seat Pleasant, MD
F/C	2/21	Harrison Henderson	6 ft 11 in (2.11 m)	240 lb (109 kg)	GS	Milwaukee	Dallas, TX
G/F	4	Isaiah Rollins	6 ft 3 in (1.91 m)	185 lb (84 kg)	Jr	Northside High School	Opelousas, LA
G	5	Jayden Saddler	6 ft 1 in (1.85 m)	195 lb (88 kg)	Jr	Mt. Zion Prep Academy	Aberdeen, MD
G/F	10	Delor Johnson	6 ft 3 in (1.91 m)	195 lb (88 kg)	So	Cypress Ranch High School	Houston, TX
G	11	DeSean Woods	6 ft 0 in (1.83 m)	165 lb (75 kg)	Fr	Core4Prep Academy	Lexington, KY
G	20	Lamarcus Lee	6 ft 2 in (1.88 m)	185 lb (84 kg)	RS Sr	San Jacinto College	Baton Rouge, LA
F/C	22	Andre Allen	6 ft 9 in (2.06 m)	215 lb (98 kg)	Sr	Arizona State	Los Angeles, CA
C	23	James Edwards	6 ft 11 in (2.11 m)	205 lb (93 kg)	RS Sr	Western Texas College	Seattle, WA
F	24	Andre Toure	6 ft 8 in (2.03 m)	210 lb (95 kg)	Jr	Howard	Paris, France
G/F	25	Samkelo Cele	6 ft 5 in (1.96 m)	210 lb (95 kg)	Jr	Northeastern Oklahoma A&M College	Durban, South Africa
G	30	Brendon Brooks	5 ft 9 in (1.75 m)	165 lb (75 kg)	RS Sr	Lakeview Centennial High School	Dallas, TX
F/C	32	Jamarcus Jones	6 ft 7 in (2.01 m)	210 lb (95 kg)	RS Jr	Pearl River Community College	Sardis, MS
G	33	Jason Holliday	6 ft 4 in (1.93 m)	210 lb (95 kg)	RS Jr	Murray State	Baton Rouge, LA
C	35	Kirk Parker	6 ft 7 in (2.01 m)	245 lb (111 kg)	RS Jr	Pearl River Community College	Vicksburg, MS
F	40/55	Damiree Burns	6 ft 7 in (2.01 m)	210 lb (95 kg)	So	Sophie B. Wright High School	New Orleans, LA

Head coach

- Sean Woods (Kentucky)

Assistant coach(es)

- Ryan Price (Henderson State)
- Pedro Cipriano (Southern)
- Jethro Hillman (Miami (FL))
- Martiese Morones (Kentucky)

Legend

- (C) Team captain
- (S) Suspended
- (I) Ineligible
- (W) Walk-on
- Injured
- Current redshirt

Roster
Last update: January 20, 2021

== Schedule and results ==
Date time, TV	Rank^{#}	Opponent^{#}	Result	Record	Site (attendance) city, state
Non-conference regular season
November 26, 2020*; 3:00 p.m.		vs. North Carolina Central	L 78–85 ^{OT}	0–1	Carver–Hawkeye Arena (227); Iowa City, IA
November 27, 2020*; 4:00 p.m., BTN		at No. 5 Iowa	L 76–103	0–2	Carver–Hawkeye Arena (535); Iowa City, IA
December 9, 2020*; 7:00 p.m., SECN+		at Arkansas	L 44–79	0–3	Bud Walton Arena (3,256); Fayetteville, AR
December 10, 2020*; 8:00 p.m., RSNW		at No. 1 Gonzaga	Canceled due to COVID-19		McCarthey Athletic Center; Spokane, WA
December 16, 2020*; 6:30 p.m., CUSA TV		at UAB	L 46–88	0–4	Bartow Arena (784); Birmingham, AL
December 19, 2020*; 6:00 p.m., Big West TV		at UC Riverside	Canceled due to COVID-19		SRC Arena; Riverside, CA
December 21, 2020*; 4:00 p.m., WAC DN		at California Baptist	Canceled due to COVID-19		CBU Events Center; Riverside, CA
SWAC regular season
January 2, 2021; 4:30 p.m.		Prairie View A&M	Canceled due to COVID-19		F. G. Clark Center; Baton Rouge, LA
January 4, 2021; 5:00 p.m., ESPNU		Texas Southern	Canceled due to COVID-19		F. G. Clark Center; Baton Rouge, LA
January 9, 2021; 5:30 p.m.		at Grambling State	W 61–55	1–4 (1–0)	Fredrick C. Hobdy Assembly Center (708); Grambling, LA
January 11, 2021; 7:30 p.m.		at Jackson State	Canceled due to COVID-19		Williams Assembly Center; Jackson, MS
January 16, 2021; 4:30 p.m.		Arkansas–Pine Bluff	W 88–53	2–4 (2–0)	F. G. Clark Center (1,286); Baton Rouge, LA
January 18, 2021; 4:30 p.m.		Mississippi Valley State	W 102–61	3–4 (3–0)	F. G. Clark Center (1,286); Baton Rouge, LA
January 23, 2021; 2:00 p.m.		at Alabama A&M	L 58–68	3–5 (3–1)	Elmore Gymnasium (275); Huntsville, AL
January 25, 2021; 8:00 p.m.		at Alabama State	L 64–66	3–6 (3–2)	Dunn–Oliver Acadome (1,499); Montgomery, AL
January 30, 2021; 5:30 p.m.		at Alcorn State	W 76–59	4–6 (4–2)	Davey Whitney Complex; Lorman, MS
February 6, 2021; 4:30 p.m.		Grambling State	L 69–72	4–7 (4–3)	F. G. Clark Center; Baton Rouge, LA
February 8, 2021; 8:00 p.m., ESPNU		Jackson State	L 53–57	4–8 (4–4)	F. G. Clark Center; Baton Rouge, LA
February 13, 2021; 5:00 p.m.		at Arkansas–Pine Bluff	W 73–71	5–8 (5–4)	K. L. Johnson Complex; Pine Bluff, AR
February 17, 2021; 7:30 p.m.		at Mississippi Valley State	Canceled		Harrison HPER Complex; Itta Bena, MS
February 20, 2021; 4:30 p.m.		Alabama A&M	Postponed		F. G. Clark Center; Baton Rouge, LA
February 22, 2021; 7:30 p.m.		Alabama State	W 75–66	6–8 (6–4)	F. G. Clark Center; Baton Rouge, LA
February 24, 2021; 4:30 p.m.		Alabama A&M; Rescheduled from February 20	W 73–57	7–8 (7–4)	F. G. Clark Center; Baton Rouge, LA
February 27, 2021; 4:30 p.m.		Alcorn State	W 89–75	8–8 (8–4)	F. G. Clark Center; Baton Rouge, LA
March 4, 2021; 7:30 p.m.		at Prairie View A&M	L 61–68	8–9 (8–5)	William J. Nicks Building; Prairie View, TX
March 6, 2021; 7:30 p.m.		at Texas Southern	L 74–80	8–10 (8–6)	H&PE Arena; Houston, TX
SWAC tournament
March 11, 2021; 8:30 p.m., ESPN3	(5)	vs. (4) Grambling State; Quarterfinals	L 67–72 ^{OT}	8–11	Bartow Arena; Birmingham, AL
*Non-conference game. ^{#}Rankings from AP poll. (#) Tournament seedings in parentheses. All times are in Central.
