= 2020–21 Alabama A&M Bulldogs basketball team =

American college basketball season

2020–21 Alabama A&M Bulldogs basketball
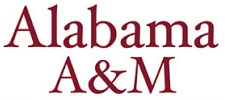
- Conference: Southwestern Athletic Conference
- Record: 6–9 (4–9 SWAC)
- Head coach: Dylan Howard (3rd season)
- Associate head coach: Derrick Tilmon
- Assistant coaches: Antwain Banks; Carl Richburg
- Home arena: Elmore Gymnasium

2020–21 SWAC men's basketball standings
	Conf.				Overall
Team	W		L	PCT	W		L	PCT
Prairie View A&M	13	–	0	1.000	16	–	5	.762
Jackson State	11	–	0	1.000	12	–	6	.667
Texas Southern †	10	–	3	.769	17	–	9	.654
Grambling State	9	–	6	.600	12	–	12	.500
Southern	8	–	6	.571	8	–	11	.421
Alcorn State	6	–	7	.462	6	–	13	.316
Alabama A&M*	4	–	9	.308	6	–	9	.400
Alabama State*	4	–	14	.222	4	–	14	.222
Arkansas–Pine Bluff	3	–	12	.200	4	–	21	.160
Mississippi Valley State	2	–	13	.133	2	–	22	.083
† 2021 SWAC tournament winner *Ineligible for postseason due to APR violations

The 2020–21 Alabama A&M Bulldogs basketball team represented Alabama A&M University in the 2020–21 NCAA Division I men's basketball season. The Bulldogs, led by third-year head coach Dylan Howard, played their home games at the Elmore Gymnasium in Normal, Alabama as members of the Southwestern Athletic Conference.

== Previous season ==
The Bulldogs finished the 2019–20 season 8–22, 5–13 in SWAC play to finish in eighth place. They lost in the quarterfinals of the SWAC tournament to Prairie View A&M.

== Roster ==
2020–21 Alabama A&M Bulldogs men's basketball team
Players
Coaches

Pos.	#	Name	Height	Weight	Year	Previous school	Hometown
G	0	Jevon Tatum	6 ft 1 in (1.85 m)	180 lb (82 kg)	Fr	Bull City Prep (NC)	Snellville, Georgia
F	1	Myles Parker	6 ft 7 in (2.01 m)	210 lb (95 kg)	Jr	Auburn	Huntsville, Alabama
G	3	Cameron Tucker	6 ft 1 in (1.85 m)	170 lb (77 kg)	So	Wenonah High School	Birmingham, Alabama
F	5	Jalen Johnson	6 ft 7 in (2.01 m)	230 lb (104 kg)	So	Emmerich Manual High School	Indianapolis, Indiana
G	10	Garrett Hicks	6 ft 0 in (1.83 m)	160 lb (73 kg)	So	James Clemens High School	Madison, Alabama
C	11	Abba Lawal	7 ft 0 in (2.13 m)	210 lb (95 kg)	Fr	Hargrave Military Academy	Kaduna, Nigeria
G/F	12	Brandon Powell	6 ft 3 in (1.91 m)	205 lb (93 kg)	Jr	Lee High School	Huntsville, Alabama
G/F	15	Dailin Smith	6 ft 6 in (1.98 m)	185 lb (84 kg)	Fr	Rocktop Academy (PA)	Colorado Springs, Colorado
G	22	London Riley	6 ft 3 in (1.91 m)	175 lb (79 kg)	Fr	Discovery High School	Atlanta, Georgia
F	23	Anjay Cortez	6 ft 8 in (2.03 m)	185 lb (84 kg)	Fr	United Faith Christian Academy	Charlotte, North Carolina
G	24	Eric Lee	6 ft 4 in (1.93 m)	195 lb (88 kg)	Fr	Surge Christian Academy	Tampa, Florida
F	30	Brandon Houston	6 ft 7 in (2.01 m)	235 lb (107 kg)	Sr	Ramsay High School	Birmingham, Alabama
C	34/20	EJ Williams	6 ft 10 in (2.08 m)	275 lb (125 kg)	So	The Skills Factory (GA)	Cincinnati, Ohio
F	35	Tremere Brown	6 ft 8 in (2.03 m)	210 lb (95 kg)	So	Central High School (AL)	Phenix City, Alabama

Head coach

- Dylan Howard (UAB)

Assistant coach(es)

- Derrick Tilmon (Hiwassee)
- Antwain Banks (IU Southeast)
- Carl Richburg (Miami (OH))

Legend

- (C) Team captain
- (S) Suspended
- (I) Ineligible
- (W) Walk-on
- Injured
- Current redshirt

Roster
Last update: January 20, 2021

== Schedule and results ==
Date time, TV	Rank^{#}	Opponent^{#}	Result	Record	Site (attendance) city, state
Non-conference regular season
November 29, 2020*; 2:00 pm, ESPN+		at Samford	W 78–76	1–0	Pete Hanna Center (680); Homewood, AL
December 5, 2020*; 6:00 pm, BTN		at No. 23 Ohio State	Canceled due to COVID-19		Value City Arena; Columbus, OH
December 16, 2020*; 6:00 pm, ESPN+		at North Alabama	Canceled due to COVID-19		Flowers Hall; Florence, AL
December 19, 2020*; 2:00 pm		South Alabama	W 93–90 ^{2OT}	2–0	Elmore Gymnasium (57); Normal, AL
SWAC regular season
January 2, 2021; 5:30 pm		Jackson State	Canceled due to COVID-19		Elmore Gymnasium; Normal, AL
January 4, 2021		Grambling State	Canceled due to COVID-19		Elmore Gymnasium; Normal, AL
January 9, 2021; 4:30 pm		at Mississippi Valley State	Canceled due to COVID-19		Harrison HPER Complex; Itta Bena, MS
January 11, 2021; 7:00 pm		at Arkansas–Pine Bluff	Canceled due to COVID-19		K. L. Johnson Complex; Pine Bluff, AR
January 16, 2021; 4:00 pm		Alabama State	W 70–63	3–0 (1–0)	Elmore Gymnasium (275); Normal, AL
January 23, 2021; 2:00 pm		Southern	W 68–58	4–0 (2–0)	Elmore Gymnasium (275); Normal, AL
January 25, 2021; 6:00 pm		Alcorn State	Canceled due to COVID-19		Elmore Gymnasium; Normal, AL
January 30, 2021; 6:00 pm		at Prairie View A&M	L 57–79	4–1 (2–1)	William J. Nicks Building (558); Prairie View, TX
February 1, 2021; 7:30 pm		at Texas Southern	L 49–66	4–2 (2–2)	H&PE Arena (450); Houston, TX
February 6, 2021; 4:30 pm		Mississippi Valley State	W 93–58	5–2 (3–2)	Elmore Gymnasium (187); Normal, AL
February 8, 2021; 7:30 pm		Arkansas–Pine Bluff	W 56–55	6–2 (4–2)	Elmore Gymnasium (201); Normal, AL
February 13, 2021; 4:30 pm		at Alabama State	L 58–72	6–3 (4–3)	Dunn–Oliver Acadome (1,500); Montgomery, AL
February 20, 2021; 1:30 pm		at Southern	Postponed due to COVID-19		F. G. Clark Center; Baton Rouge, LA
February 22, 2021; 7:30 pm		at Alcorn State	L 52–65	6–4 (4–4)	Davey Whitney Complex (237); Lorman, MS
February 24, 2021; 1:30 pm		at Southern rescheduled from February 20	L 57–73	6–5 (4–5)	F. G. Clark Center; Baton Rouge, LA
February 27, 2021; 4:30 pm		Prairie View A&M	L 54–55	6–6 (4–6)	Elmore Gymnasium; Normal, AL
March 1, 2021; 7:30 pm		Texas Southern	L 58–66	6–7 (4–7)	Elmore Gymnasium; Normal, AL
March 4, 2021; 7:30 pm		at Jackson State	L 35–50	6–8 (4–8)	Williams Assembly Center; Jackson, MS
March 6, 2021; 5:30 pm		at Grambling State	L 72–80	6–9 (4–9)	Fredrick C. Hobdy Assembly Center; Grambling, LA
*Non-conference game. ^{#}Rankings from AP Poll. (#) Tournament seedings in parentheses. All times are in Central.
