= 2020–21 Jackson State Tigers basketball team =

American college basketball season

2020–21 Jackson State Tigers basketball

SWAC regular-season co-champions
- Conference: Southwestern Athletic Conference
- Record: 12–6 (11–0 SWAC)
- Head coach: Wayne Brent (8th season)
- Assistant coaches: Cason Burk; De'Suan Dixon; Christopher Woodall
- Home arena: Williams Assembly Center

2020–21 SWAC men's basketball standings
	Conf.				Overall
Team	W		L	PCT	W		L	PCT
Prairie View A&M	13	–	0	1.000	16	–	5	.762
Jackson State	11	–	0	1.000	12	–	6	.667
Texas Southern †	10	–	3	.769	17	–	9	.654
Grambling State	9	–	6	.600	12	–	12	.500
Southern	8	–	6	.571	8	–	11	.421
Alcorn State	6	–	7	.462	6	–	13	.316
Alabama A&M*	4	–	9	.308	6	–	9	.400
Alabama State*	4	–	14	.222	4	–	14	.222
Arkansas–Pine Bluff	3	–	12	.200	4	–	21	.160
Mississippi Valley State	2	–	13	.133	2	–	22	.083
† 2021 SWAC tournament winner *Ineligible for postseason due to APR violations

The 2020–21 Jackson State Tigers basketball team represented Jackson State University in the 2020–21 NCAA Division I men's basketball season. The Tigers, led by eighth-year head coach Wayne Brent, played their home games at the Williams Assembly Center in Jackson, Mississippi as members of the Southwestern Athletic Conference (SWAC).

== Previous season ==
The Tigers finished the 2019–20 season 15–17, 11–7 in SWAC play, to finish in a three-way tie for fourth place. They defeated Alcorn State in the quarterfinals of the SWAC tournament, and were set to face Prairie View A&M in the semifinals until the tournament was cancelled amid the COVID-19 pandemic.

== Roster ==
2020–21 Jackson State Tigers men's basketball team
Players
Coaches

Pos.	#	Name	Height	Weight	Year	Hometown
G	0	Demarion Bariffe-Smith	6 ft 5 in (1.96 m)	185 lb (84 kg)	Jr	Evanston, IL
F	1	Darius Hicks	6 ft 8 in (2.03 m)	225 lb (102 kg)	GS	Quitman, MS
G	2	Ken Evans Jr.	6 ft 4 in (1.93 m)	190 lb (86 kg)	RS Fr	Jackson, MS
G	3	Jonas James	6 ft 0 in (1.83 m)	160 lb (73 kg)	Sr	Jackson, MS
G	4	Tristan Jarrett	6 ft 4 in (1.93 m)	195 lb (88 kg)	Sr	Brownsville, TN
G	5	Calvin Temple	6 ft 0 in (1.83 m)	170 lb (77 kg)	So	Olive Branch, MS
G	10	Cainan McClelland	6 ft 4 in (1.93 m)	180 lb (82 kg)	GS	Houston, TX
F	11	Jayveous McKinnis	6 ft 7 in (2.01 m)	220 lb (100 kg)	Jr	Brandon, MS
G	12	Darrian Wilson	6 ft 4 in (1.93 m)	200 lb (91 kg)	GS	Brookhaven, MS
F	13	Kelvin Wesley	6 ft 5 in (1.96 m)	195 lb (88 kg)	RS So	Houston, TX
G	14	Wesley Taylor	6 ft 0 in (1.83 m)	150 lb (68 kg)	Fr	Olive Branch, MS
F	15	Hezekiah Quinlan	6 ft 7 in (2.01 m)	220 lb (100 kg)	Jr	Beaverton, OR
G	20	Charles Dismuke	6 ft 3 in (1.91 m)	170 lb (77 kg)	RS So	Chicago, IL
G	22	Micheal Jr. Tate	6 ft 4 in (1.93 m)	195 lb (88 kg)	Jr	Houston, TX
F	23	Larry Kuimi	6 ft 6 in (1.98 m)	225 lb (102 kg)	Sr	Missouri City, TX
G	24	Jalani Bell	6 ft 0 in (1.83 m)	190 lb (86 kg)	Fr	Jackson, MS
F	25	Darryl Jordan	6 ft 7 in (2.01 m)	215 lb (98 kg)	RS So	Hattiesburg, MS
F	30	David McDaniel	6 ft 8 in (2.03 m)	196 lb (89 kg)	Fr	Alpharetta, GA
G	33	Geronimo Warner	6 ft 2 in (1.88 m)	185 lb (84 kg)	RS Fr	Mesa, AZ
G	34	Kesaiah Parks	6 ft 3 in (1.91 m)	170 lb (77 kg)	Fr	Lincoln, NE

Head coach

- Wayne Brent (Louisiana–Monroe)

Assistant coach(es)

- Cason Burk (Jackson State)
- De'Suan Dixon (Jackson State)
- Christopher Woodall (William Carey)

Legend

- (C) Team captain
- (S) Suspended
- (I) Ineligible
- (W) Walk-on
- Injured
- Current redshirt

Roster
Last update: December 25, 2020

== Schedule and results ==
Date time, TV	Rank^{#}	Opponent^{#}	Result	Record	Site (attendance) city, state
Non-conference regular season
November 25, 2020*; 4:00 p.m.		vs. Arkansas State; Justin Reed Ole Miss Classic	Canceled		The Pavilion at Ole Miss; Oxford, MS
November 26, 2020*; 1:00 p.m., SECN		at Ole Miss; Justin Reed Ole Miss Classic	Canceled		The Pavilion at Ole Miss; Oxford, MS
November 27, 2020*; 4:00 p.m.		vs. Central Arkansas; Justin Reed Ole Miss Classic	Canceled		The Pavilion at Ole Miss; Oxford, MS
December 2, 2020*; 6:00 p.m.		at North Alabama	Canceled		Flowers Hall; Florence, AL
December 8, 2020*; 8:00 p.m., SECN		at Mississippi State	L 59–82	0–1	Humphrey Coliseum (1,889); Starkville, MS
December 10, 2020*; 7:00 p.m., SECN		at Ole Miss	L 45–80	0–2	The Pavilion at Ole Miss (1,804); Oxford, MS
December 15, 2020*; 6:30 p.m.		at Louisiana Tech	L 58–85	0–3	Thomas Assembly Center (1,200); Ruston, LA
December 17, 2020*; 7:00 p.m., ESPN3		at Bradley	L 60–83	0–4	Carver Arena; Peoria, IL
December 20, 2020*; 12:00 p.m., Big 12 Now		at Iowa State	L 45–60	0–5	Hilton Coliseum (849); Ames, IA
December 22, 2020*; 12:00 p.m.		at North Alabama	Canceled		Flowers Hall; Florence, AL
SWAC regular season
January 2, 2021; 5:30 p.m.		at Alabama A&M	Postponed due to COVID-19		Elmore Gymnasium; Huntsville, AL
January 4, 2021; 7:30 p.m.		at Alabama State	W 60–44	1–5 (1–0)	Dunn–Oliver Acadome (276); Montgomery, AL
January 9, 2021; 5:30 p.m.		Alcorn State	Postponed due to COVID-19		Williams Assembly Center; Jackson, MS
January 11, 2021; 7:30 p.m.		Southern	Postponed due to COVID-19		Williams Assembly Center; Jackson, MS
January 16, 2021		at Prairie View A&M	Postponed due to COVID-19		William J. Nicks Building; Prairie View, TX
January 18, 2021; 7:30 p.m.		at Texas Southern	Postponed due to COVID-19		H&PE Arena; Houston, TX
January 23, 2021; 5:30 p.m.		at Grambling State	W 75–61	2–5 (2–0)	Fredrick C. Hobdy Assembly Center (706); Grambling, LA
January 28, 2021; 7:00 p.m.		Alcorn State	Postponed due to COVID-19		Williams Assembly Center; Jackson, MS
January 30, 2021; 5:30 p.m.		Mississippi Valley State	W 106–56	3–5 (3–0)	Williams Assembly Center; Jackson, MS
February 1, 2021; 7:30 p.m.		Arkansas–Pine Bluff	W 63–55	4–5 (4–0)	Williams Assembly Center; Jackson, MS
February 6, 2021; 5:30 p.m.		at Alcorn State	W 74–66	5–5 (5–0)	Davey Whitney Complex; Lorman, MS
February 8, 2021; 7:30 p.m.		at Southern	W 57–53	6–5 (6–0)	F. G. Clark Center; Baton Rouge, LA
February 13, 2021; 5:30 p.m.		Prairie View A&M	Postponed		Williams Assembly Center; Jackson, MS
February 16, 2021; 7:30 p.m.		Texas Southern	Postponed		Williams Assembly Center; Jackson, MS
February 22, 2021; 5:30 p.m., NBA TV		Grambling State	W 63–59	7–5 (7–0)	Williams Assembly Center; Jackson, MS
February 27, 2021; 4:30 p.m.		at Mississippi Valley State	W 68–54	8–5 (8–0)	Harrison HPER Complex; Itta Bena, MS
March 1, 2021; 7:30 p.m.		at Arkansas–Pine Bluff	W 64–58 ^{OT}	9–5 (9–0)	K. L. Johnson Complex; Pine Bluff, AR
March 4, 2021; 7:30 p.m.		Alabama A&M	W 50–35	10–5 (10–0)	Williams Assembly Center; Jackson, MS
March 6, 2021; 5:30 p.m.		Alabama State	W 79–54	11–5 (11–0)	Williams Assembly Center; Jackson, MS
SWAC tournament
March 10, 2021; 2:00 p.m., ESPN3	(2)	vs. (7) Arkansas–Pine Bluff; Quarterfinals	W 74–62	12–5	Bartow Arena; Birmingham, AL
March 12, 2021; 2:00 p.m., ESPN3	(2)	vs. (3) Texas Southern; Semifinals	L 81–84 ^{OT}	12–6	Bartow Arena; Birmingham, AL
*Non-conference game. ^{#}Rankings from AP poll. (#) Tournament seedings in parentheses. All times are in Central.
