= 2020–21 Texas Southern Tigers basketball team =

American college basketball season

2020–21 Texas Southern Tigers basketball
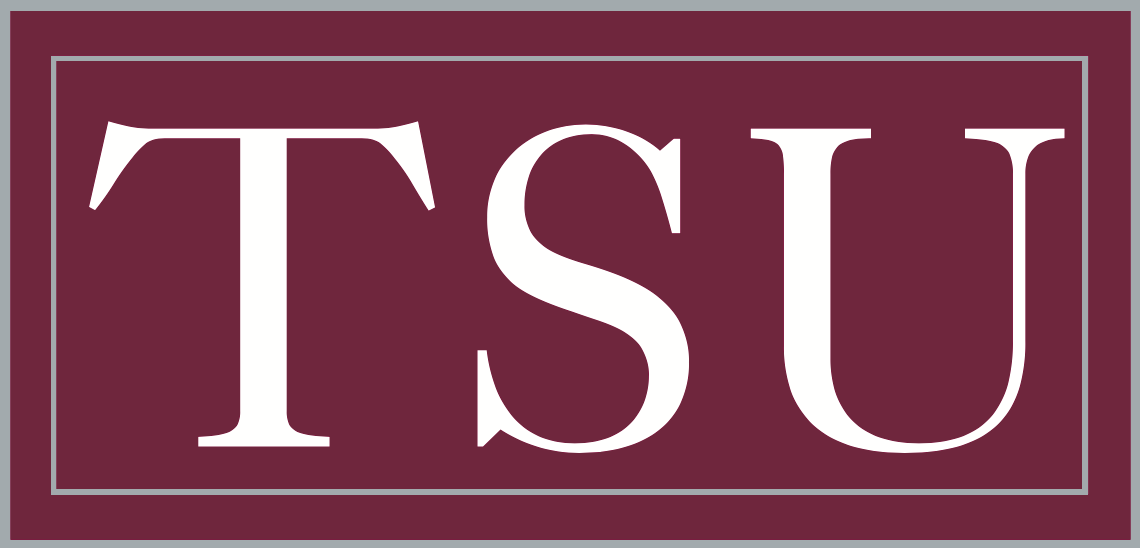

SWAC tournament champions

NCAA tournament, first round
- Conference: Southwestern Athletic Conference
- Record: 17–9 (10–3 SWAC)
- Head coach: Johnny Jones (3rd season)
- Assistant coaches: Randy Peele; Shyrone Chatman; JD Williams; Brandon Chambers
- Home arena: Health and Physical Education Arena

2020–21 SWAC men's basketball standings
	Conf.				Overall
Team	W		L	PCT	W		L	PCT
Prairie View A&M	13	–	0	1.000	16	–	5	.762
Jackson State	11	–	0	1.000	12	–	6	.667
Texas Southern †	10	–	3	.769	17	–	9	.654
Grambling State	9	–	6	.600	12	–	12	.500
Southern	8	–	6	.571	8	–	11	.421
Alcorn State	6	–	7	.462	6	–	13	.316
Alabama A&M*	4	–	9	.308	6	–	9	.400
Alabama State*	4	–	14	.222	4	–	14	.222
Arkansas–Pine Bluff	3	–	12	.200	4	–	21	.160
Mississippi Valley State	2	–	13	.133	2	–	22	.083
† 2021 SWAC tournament winner *Ineligible for postseason due to APR violations

The 2020–21 Texas Southern Tigers basketball team represented Texas Southern University during the 2020–21 NCAA Division I men's basketball season. The Tigers were led by third-year head coach Johnny Jones and played their home games at the Health and Physical Education Arena in Houston, Texas, as members of the Southwestern Athletic Conference (SWAC). They finished the season 17-9, 11-3 in SWAC Play to finish in 3rd place. They defeated Alcorn State, Jackson State, and Prairie View A&M to be champions of the SWAC tournament. They received the conference’s automatic bid to the NCAA tournament where they defeated Mount St Mary’s in the First Four before losing in the first round to Michigan.

== Previous season ==
The Tigers finished the 2019–20 season 16–16 overall, 12–6 in SWAC play, to finish third place in the conference. The Tigers defeated Grambling State in the quarterfinals of the SWAC tournament. The remainder of the tournament was cancelled by the National Collegiate Athletic Association due to the COVID-19 pandemic on March 12, 2020.

== Offseason ==
=== Departures ===
Name	Pos.	Height	Weight	Year	Hometown	Reason for departure
Jordan Andrews	G	6'5"	180	Graduate student	LaPlace, Louisiana	Completed college eligibility
Tyrik Armstrong	G	5'10"	170	Senior	Houston, Texas	Graduated
Michael Dobbins	F	6'6"	275	Sophomore	Compton, California	
Eden Ewing	F	6'8"	225	Senior	Richmond, Texas	Graduated
Kevin Granger	F	6'5"	194	Junior (Redshirt)	Houston, Texas	Graduated
Divonte Lumpkin	G	6'1"	175	Senior (Redshirt)	Chicago, Illinois	Completed college eligibility
Ja'Mere Redus	G	6'0"	170	Freshman (Redshirt)	Houston, Texas	Entered transfer portal
Jethro Tshisumpa	F	6'10"	260	Junior (Redshirt)	Lubumbashi, DR Congo	Entered transfer portal

== Roster ==
2020–21 Texas Southern Tigers men's basketball team
Players
Coaches

Pos.	#	Name	Height	Weight	Year	Previous school	Hometown
F	0	Yahuza Rasas	6 ft 7 in (2.01 m)	200 lb (91 kg)	Jr	Mineral Area College	St. Louis, Missouri
F	1	Galen Alexander	6 ft 6 in (1.98 m)	220 lb (100 kg)	Sr	Georgetown	Breaux Bridge, Louisiana
G	2	Ja'Mare Redus	5 ft 11 in (1.8 m)	170 lb (77 kg)	So	Eisenhower HS	Houston, Texas
G	4	Bryson Etienne	6 ft 3 in (1.91 m)	190 lb (86 kg)	Sr	Temple College	Houston, Texas
F	5	Joirdon Nicholas	6 ft 9 in (2.06 m)	220 lb (100 kg)	Jr	Stephen F. Austin	Pearland, Texas
G	11	Jordan Gilliam	6 ft 5 in (1.96 m)	175 lb (79 kg)	RS Jr	UC Riverside	Houston, Texas
G	12	John Jones	6 ft 0 in (1.83 m)	165 lb (75 kg)	Sr	Nevada	Baton Rouge, Louisiana
F	14	Chris Baldwin	6 ft 9 in (2.06 m)	220 lb (100 kg)	Sr	UMass	Springfield, Massachusetts
F	15	Justin Hopkins	6 ft 5 in (1.96 m)	205 lb (93 kg)	GS	Samford	Huntsville, Alabama
G	20	Michael Weathers	6 ft 3 in (1.91 m)	175 lb (79 kg)	Sr	Oklahoma State	Roeland Park, Kansas
G	23	Ashton McClelland	6 ft 1 in (1.85 m)	155 lb (70 kg)	RS So	Cypress Ranch HS	Houston, Texas
F	24	John Walker III	6 ft 9 in (2.06 m)	200 lb (91 kg)	RS Jr	Texas A&M	Houston, Texas
G	32	Andrew Malveaux III	5 ft 10 in (1.78 m)	170 lb (77 kg)	RS So	Strake Jesuit College Prep	Houston, Texas
G	33	Quinton Brigham	6 ft 5 in (1.96 m)	215 lb (98 kg)	Sr	Hill College	Fort Worth, Texas

Head coach

- Johnny Jones (LSU)

Assistant coach(es)

- Randy Peele
- Shyrone Chatman
- JD Williams
- Brandon Chambers

Legend

- (C) Team captain
- (S) Suspended
- (I) Ineligible
- (W) Walk-on
- Injured
- Current redshirt

Roster
Last update: January 3, 2021

== Schedule and results ==
Date time, TV	Rank^{#}	Opponent^{#}	Result	Record	High points	High rebounds	High assists	Site (attendance) city, state
Non-conference regular season
November 25, 2020*; 10:00 pm, P12N		at Washington State	L 52–56	0–1	10 – Tied	9 – Weathers	4 – Gilliam	Beasley Coliseum; Pullman, WA
November 28, 2020*; 6:30 pm, ESPN+		at Oklahoma State	L 65–85	0–2	22 – Alexander	9 – Nicholas	4 – Walker	Gallagher-Iba Arena (3,350); Stillwater, OK
November 30, 2020*; 8:00 pm		at Wyoming	W 76–74	1–2	21 – Weathers	7 – Weathers	3 – Weathers	Arena-Auditorium (1,066); Laramie, WY
December 3, 2020*; 9:00 p.m.		at Saint Mary's	L 70–82	1–3	23 – Weathers	6 – Nicholas	3 – Weathers	University Credit Union Pavilion; Moraga, CA
December 11, 2020*; 5:00 p.m.		LeTourneau	W 103–60	2–3	35 – Walker	10 – Nicholas	5 – Gilliam	H&PE Arena; Houston, TX
December 15, 2020*; 6:00 p.m.		at Auburn	L 63–80	2–4	11 – Weathers	5 – Tied	3 – Tied	Auburn Arena (1,824); Auburn, AL
December 21, 2020*; 8:00 p.m., BYUtv		at BYU	L 71–87	2–5	23 – Weathers	12 – Rasas	5 – Weathers	Marriott Center; Provo, UT
December 23, 2020*; 12:00 pm, P12N		at USC	Cancelled					Galen Center; Los Angeles, CA
December 26, 2020*; 4:00 pm		at LSU	Cancelled					Pete Maravich Assembly Center; Baton Rouge, LA
December 30, 2020*; 7:00 pm, ESPN+		at TCU	Cancelled					Schollmaier Arena; Fort Worth, TX
SWAC regular season
January 2, 2021; 5:30 p.m.		at Alcorn State	Postponed					Davey Whitney Complex; Lorman, MS
January 4, 2021; 7:30 p.m.		at Southern	Postponed					F. G. Clark Center; Baton Rouge, LA
January 11, 2021; 7:00 p.m.		at Prairie View A&M	L 67–73	2–6 (0–1)	15 – Alexander	9 – Alexander	3 – Weathers	William J. Nicks Building (429); Prairie View, TX
January 16, 2021; 7:30 p.m.		Grambling State	L 72–78	2–7 (0–2)	17 – Alexander	7 – Walker	4 – Gilliam	H&PE Arena; Houston, TX
January 18, 2021; 7:30 p.m.		Jackson State	Postponed					H&PE Arena; Houston, TX
January 23, 2021; 7:00 p.m.		at Arkansas–Pine Bluff	W 66–57	3–7 (1–2)	14 – Alexander	9 – Rasas	4 – Gilliam	K. L. Johnson Complex; Pine Bluff, AR
January 25, 2021; 7:30 p.m.		at Mississippi Valley State	Postponed					Harrison HPER Complex; Itta Bena, MS
January 30, 2021; 7:30 p.m.		Alabama State	W 80–73	4–7 (2–2)	18 – Tied	9 – Tied	5 – Weathers	H&PE Arena (500); Houston, TX
February 1, 2021; 7:30 p.m.		Alabama A&M	W 66–49	5–7 (3–2)	15 – Gilliam	9 – Tied	8 – Weathers	H&PE Arena (450); Houston, TX
February 6, 2021; 7:30 p.m.		Prairie View A&M	Postponed					H&PE Arena; Houston, TX
February 6, 2021*; 7:00 p.m.		Texas–Rio Grande Valley	W 77–75	6–7	26 – Alexander	8 – Gilliam	5 – Gilliam	H&PE Arena (473); Houston, TX
February 13, 2021; 3:30 p.m.		at Grambling State	W 75–73	7–7 (4–2)	18 – Gilliam	14 – Nicholas	9 – Gilliam	Fredrick C. Hobdy Assembly Center (450); Grambling, LA
February 16, 2021; 3:00 p.m.		at Jackson State	Postponed					Williams Assembly Center; Jackson, MS
February 21, 2021; 4:00 p.m.		Prairie View A&M	L 75–77	7–8 (4–3)	20 – Weathers	9 – Nicholas	3 – Tied	H&PE Arena; Houston, TX
February 23, 2021; 7:30 p.m.		Mississippi Valley State	W 82–45	8–8 (5–3)	19 – Nicholas	10 – Weathers	3 – Gilliam	H&PE Arena; Houston, TX
February 25, 2021; 7:30 p.m.		Arkansas–Pine Bluff	W 79–65	9–8 (6–3)	23 – Weathers	10 – Nicholas	5 – Weathers	H&PE Arena (567); Houston, TX
February 27, 2021; 4:30 p.m.		at Alabama State	W 86–76	10–8 (7–3)	23 – Weathers	9 – Walker	4 – Gilliam	Dunn–Oliver Acadome (970); Montgomery, AL
March 1, 2021; 7:30 p.m.		at Alabama A&M	W 68–58	11–8 (8–3)	18 – Weathers	11 – Alexander	3 – Weathers	Elmore Gymnasium (146); Huntsville, AL
March 4, 2021; 7:30 p.m.		Alcorn State	W 80–78	12–8 (9–3)	18 – Weathers	9 – Alexander	3 – Weathers	Campbell Center; Houston, TX
March 6, 2021; 7:30 p.m.		Southern	W 80–74	13–8 (10–3)	28 – Weathers	9 – Nicholas	6 – Weathers	Campbell Center; Houston, TX
SWAC tournament
March 11, 2021; 2:00 pm, ESPN3	(3)	vs. (6) Alcorn State; Quarterfinals	W 78–55	14–8	24 – Nicholas	13 – Nicholas	5 – Weathers	Bartow Arena (222); Birmingham, AL
March 12, 2021; 2:00 pm, ESPN3	(3)	vs. (2) Jackson State; Semifinals	W 84–81 ^{OT}	15–8	30 – Weathers	9 – Alexander	5 – Weathers	Bartow Arena; Birmingham, AL
March 13, 2021; 5:00 pm, ESPNU	(3)	vs. (1) Prairie View A&M; Championship	W 80–61	16–8	16 – Nicholas	12 – Nicholas	6 – Gilliam	Bartow Arena; Birmingham, AL
NCAA tournament
March 18, 2021; 4:10 pm, truTV	(16 E)	vs. (16 E) Mount St. Mary's; First Four	W 60–52	17–8	19 – Walker III	9 – Walker III	4 – Weathers	Simon Skjodt Assembly Hall; Bloomington, IN
March 20, 2021; 2:00 pm, CBS	(16 E)	vs. (1 E) No. 4 Michigan; First Round	L 66–82	17–9	24 – Weathers	8 – Rasas	2 – Tied	Mackey Arena; West Lafayette, IN
*Non-conference game. ^{#}Rankings from AP Poll. (#) Tournament seedings in parentheses. All times are in Central.
