= 2020–21 Prairie View A&M Panthers basketball team =

American college basketball season

2020–21 Prairie View A&M Panthers basketball
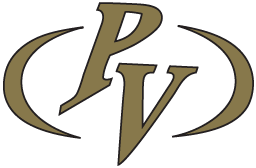

SWAC regular season co–champions
- Conference: Southwestern Athletic Conference
- Record: 16–5 (13–0 SWAC)
- Head coach: Byron Smith (5th season)
- Assistant coaches: Wendell Moore; Spencer Robertson; Caleb Villarreal
- Home arena: William Nicks Building

2020–21 SWAC men's basketball standings
	Conf.				Overall
Team	W		L	PCT	W		L	PCT
Prairie View A&M	13	–	0	1.000	16	–	5	.762
Jackson State	11	–	0	1.000	12	–	6	.667
Texas Southern †	10	–	3	.769	17	–	9	.654
Grambling State	9	–	6	.600	12	–	12	.500
Southern	8	–	6	.571	8	–	11	.421
Alcorn State	6	–	7	.462	6	–	13	.316
Alabama A&M*	4	–	9	.308	6	–	9	.400
Alabama State*	4	–	14	.222	4	–	14	.222
Arkansas–Pine Bluff	3	–	12	.200	4	–	21	.160
Mississippi Valley State	2	–	13	.133	2	–	22	.083
† 2021 SWAC tournament winner *Ineligible for postseason due to APR violations

The 2020–21 Prairie View A&M Panthers basketball team represented Prairie View A&M University in the 2020–21 NCAA Division I men's basketball season. The Panthers, led by fifth-year head coach Byron Smith, played their home games at the William Nicks Building in Prairie View, Texas as members of the Southwestern Athletic Conference.

== Previous season ==
The Panthers finished the 2019–20 season 19–13, 14–4 in SWAC play to finish as regular season SWAC champions. They defeated Alabama A&M in the quarterfinals of the SWAC tournament, and were set to take on Jackson State in the semifinal before the tournament was cancelled amid the COVID-19 pandemic. With the SWAC Tournament cancelled, they were awarded the SWAC's automatic bid to the NCAA tournament. However, the NCAA Tournament was also cancelled.

== Roster ==
2020–21 Prairie View A&M Panthers men's basketball team
Players
Coaches

Pos.	#	Name	Height	Weight	Year	Previous school	Hometown
F	0	Lenell Henry	6 ft 8 in (2.03 m)	200 lb (91 kg)	Sr	Panola College	Chicago, IL
G	1	Javen Hedgeman	6 ft 4 in (1.93 m)	190 lb (86 kg)	Jr	McLennan CC	Houston, TX
G	2	Jock Hughes	6 ft 3 in (1.91 m)	172 lb (78 kg)	RS So	Stephen F. Austin	Houston, TX
F	3	Boe Nguidjol	6 ft 8 in (2.03 m)	225 lb (102 kg)	RS Jr	Detroit Mercy	Los Angeles, CA
G	4	D'Rell Roberts	6 ft 7 in (2.01 m)	190 lb (86 kg)	Jr	Kilgore College	Dallas, TX
F	5	Myles Washington	6 ft 5 in (1.96 m)	232 lb (105 kg)	Jr	Central Georgia Tech	Charlotte, NC
G	10	Jeremiah Gambrell, Jr.	6 ft 3 in (1.91 m)	180 lb (82 kg)	So	Western Kentucky	Houston, TX
G	11	DeWayne Cox	6 ft 2 in (1.88 m)	190 lb (86 kg)	Sr	East Mississippi CC	Ripley, MS
G	12	Faite Williams	6 ft 2 in (1.88 m)	175 lb (79 kg)	Jr	Clear Springs HS	Dickinson, TX
G	13	Eric Hester	6 ft 3 in (1.91 m)	185 lb (84 kg)	Sr	Tallahassee CC	Clearwater, FL
F	14	Jerroda Briscoe	6 ft 8 in (2.03 m)	160 lb (73 kg)	Jr	Central Wyoming	St. Petersburg, FL
G	15	Damari Parris	6 ft 1 in (1.85 m)	165 lb (75 kg)	GS	Eastern Michigan	Prince George's County, MD
G	21	Danario Edgar, II	6 ft 1 in (1.85 m)	165 lb (75 kg)	RS So	Episcopal HS	Houston, TX
G	22	Jawaun Daniels	6 ft 7 in (2.01 m)	190 lb (86 kg)	Jr	Odessa College	Harlem, NY
G	23	Dajour Joseph	6 ft 6 in (1.98 m)	205 lb (93 kg)	Jr	New Mexico State	Fort Lauderdale, FL
SF	24	Jalon Clark	6 ft 5 in (1.96 m)	230 lb (104 kg)	Jr	Houston Christian HS	Houston, TX
PG	32	Cam Mack	6 ft 2 in (1.88 m)	170 lb (77 kg)	RS Jr	Nebraska	Austin, TX
C	35	Chandler Oriahki	6 ft 10 in (2.08 m)	225 lb (102 kg)	Jr	Tyler JC	Houston, TX

Head coach

- Byron Smith (Houston)

Assistant coach(es)

- Wendell Moore (Georgia Southern)
- Spencer Robertson (Wichita State)
- Caleb Villarreal (Texas Tech)

Legend

- (C) Team captain
- (S) Suspended
- (I) Ineligible
- (W) Walk-on
- Injured
- Current redshirt

Roster
Last update: February 2, 2021

== Schedule and results ==
Date time, TV	Rank^{#}	Opponent^{#}	Result	Record	Site (attendance) city, state
Non-conference regular season
November 25, 2020*; 12:00 pm, ESPN3		vs. Little Rock; Wade Houston Tipoff Classic	L 66–71	0–1	KFC Yum! Center; Louisville, KY
November 27, 2020*; 12:00 pm, ESPN3		vs. Evansville; Wade Houston Tipoff Classic	W 64–61	1–1	KFC Yum! Center; Louisville, KY
November 29, 2020*; 5:00 pm, ACCNX		at Louisville	L 64–86	1–2	KFC Yum! Center (2,934); Louisville, KY
December 3, 2020*; 5:00 pm		at Grand Canyon	Canceled		GCU Arena; Phoenix, AZ
December 15, 2020*		at Murray State	Canceled		CFSB Center; Murray, KY
December 18, 2020*; 7:00 pm		at No. 16 Missouri	Canceled		Mizzou Arena; Columbia, MO
December 21, 2021*; 6:00 pm, P12N		at Washington State	L 62–90	1–3	Beasley Coliseum; Pullman, WA
December 30, 2020*; 7:00 pm, ESPN+		at TCU	L 61–66	1–4	Schollmaier Arena (1,688); Fort Worth, TX
SWAC regular season
January 2, 2021		at Southern	Postponed		F. G. Clark Center; Baton Rouge, LA
January 4, 2021		at Alcorn State	Postponed		Davey Whitney Complex; Lorman, MS
January 11, 2020; 7:00 pm		Texas Southern	W 73–67	2–4 (1–0)	William Nicks Building (429); Prairie View, TX
January 16, 2021		Jackson State	Postponed		William Nicks Building; Prairie View, TX
January 18, 2021; 8:00 pm		Grambling State	W 59–50	3–4 (2–0)	William Nicks Building (975); Prairie View, TX
January 23, 2021; 3:00 pm		at Mississippi Valley State	W 77–31	4–4 (3–0)	Harrison HPER Complex (213); Itta Bena, MS
January 25, 2021; 6:00 pm		at Arkansas–Pine Bluff	W 73–56	5–4 (4–0)	K. L. Johnson Complex; Pine Bluff, AR
January 30, 2021; 3:00 pm		Alabama A&M	W 79–57	6–4 (5–0)	William Nicks Building (558); Prairie View, TX
February 1, 2021; 7:30 pm		Alabama State	W 87–63	7–4 (6–0)	William Nicks Building (700); Prairie View, TX
February 6, 2021; 7:30 pm, ESPNU		at Texas Southern	Postponed		H&PE Arena; Houston, TX
February 13, 2021; 5:00 pm		at Jackson State	Postponed		Williams Assembly Center; Jackson, MS
February 15, 2021; 7:30 pm		at Grambling State	Postponed		Fredrick C. Hobdy Assembly Center; Grambling, LA
February 21, 2021; 7:30 pm, ESPNU		at Texas Southern	W 77–75	8–4 (7–0)	H&PE Arena; Houston, TX
February 23, 2021; 7:30 pm		Arkansas–Pine Bluff	W 72–56	9–4 (8–0)	William Nicks Building; Prairie View, TX
February 25, 2021; 4:00 pm		Mississippi Valley State	W 82–62	10–4 (9–0)	William Nicks Building; Prairie View, TX
February 27, 2021; 6:00 pm		at Alabama A&M	W 55–54	11–4 (10–0)	Elmore Gymnasium; Huntsville, AL
March 1, 2021; 7:30 pm		at Alabama State	W 70–67	12–4 (11–0)	Dunn–Oliver Acadome; Montgomery, AL
March 4, 2021; 7:30 pm		Southern	W 68–61	13–4 (12–0)	William Nicks Building; Prairie View, TX
March 6, 2021; 2:30 pm		Alcorn State	W 81–69	14–4 (13–0)	William Nicks Building; Prairie View, TX
SWAC tournament
March 10, 2021; 8:30 pm, ESPN3	(1)	vs. (8) Mississippi Valley State; Quarterfinals	W 91–64	15–4	Bartow Arena; Birmingham, Alabama
March 12, 2021; 8:30 pm, ESPN3	(1)	vs. (4) Grambling State; Semifinals	W 74–63	16–4	Bartow Arena; Birmingham, Alabama
March 13, 2021; 5:00 pm, ESPNU	(1)	vs. (3) Texas Southern; Championship	L 61–80	16–5	Bartow Arena; Birmingham, Alabama
*Non-conference game. ^{#}Rankings from AP Poll. (#) Tournament seedings in parentheses. All times are in Central.
