= Wayne Brent =

American basketball player and coach

Playing career
- 1987–1989: Louisiana-Monroe

Coaching career (HC unless noted)
- 1989–1991: Louisiana-Monroe (grad. asst.)
- 1991–1992: Tallulah HS (asst.)
- 1992–1998: Provine HS
- 1998–2002: Ole Miss (asst.)
- 2004–2007: Piney Woods HS
- 2007–2013: Callaway HS
- 2013–2022: Jackson State

Head coaching record
- Overall: 115–153 (.429) (college)

Accomplishments and honors

Championships
- SWAC regular season (2021)

Wayne Brent is the former men's basketball head coach of the Jackson State Tigers and a former high school basketball coach and college assistant coach. He retired following the 2021-2022 season and replaced by Mo Williams.

== High school coach ==
Brent won four state championships in six seasons with Callaway High School in Jackson, Mississippi. He also coached at and won a state championship at Provine High School. He has coached many players who have gone to the National Basketball Association and overseas.

== College assistant coach ==
Brent was an assistant coach at the University of Mississippi for four seasons and helped the Rebels advance to the NCAA tournament three times out of his four seasons.

== Head coaching record ==
Record table
Season	Team	Overall	Conference	Standing	Postseason
Jackson State Tigers (SWAC) (2013–2022)
2013–14	Jackson State	11–20	7–11	7th	
2014–15	Jackson State	11–21	9–9	T–5th	
2015–16	Jackson State	20–16	12–6	3rd	CIT Second Round
2016–17	Jackson State	14–18	10–8	T–3rd	
2017–18	Jackson State	12–20	9–9	6th	
2018–19	Jackson State	13–19	10–8	T–3rd	
2019–20	Jackson State	15–17	11–7	T–4th	
2020–21	Jackson State	11–5	11–0	T–1st	
2021–22	Jackson State	11–19	9–9		
Jackson State:		118–163 (.420)	88–77 (.533)		
Total:		118–163 (.420)			
National champion Postseason invitational champion Conference regular season champion Conference regular season and conference tournament champion Division regular season champion Division regular season and conference tournament champion Conference tournament champion
