= 2021 SWAC men's basketball tournament =

US collegiate basketball tournament

- Classification: Division I
- Season: 2020–21
- Teams: 8
- Site: Bartow Arena; Birmingham, Alabama
- Champions: Texas Southern (9th title)
- Winning coach: Johnny Jones (1st title)
- MVP: Michael Weathers (Texas Southern)
- Television: ESPN3, ESPNU

2020–21 SWAC men's basketball standings
	Conf.				Overall
Team	W		L	PCT	W		L	PCT
Prairie View A&M	13	–	0	1.000	16	–	5	.762
Jackson State	11	–	0	1.000	12	–	6	.667
Texas Southern †	10	–	3	.769	17	–	9	.654
Grambling State	9	–	6	.600	12	–	12	.500
Southern	8	–	6	.571	8	–	11	.421
Alcorn State	6	–	7	.462	6	–	13	.316
Alabama A&M*	4	–	9	.308	6	–	9	.400
Alabama State*	4	–	14	.222	4	–	14	.222
Arkansas–Pine Bluff	3	–	12	.200	4	–	21	.160
Mississippi Valley State	2	–	13	.133	2	–	22	.083
*Ineligible for postseason due to APR violations
† 2021 SWAC tournament winner

The 2021 SWAC men's basketball tournament (officially known as the Cricket Wireless SWAC Basketball Tournament due to sponsorship reasons) was the postseason men's basketball tournament for the 2020–21 season in the Southwestern Athletic Conference (SWAC). The tournament was held from March 10–13, 2021. The tournament winner received an automatic invitation to the 2021 NCAA Division I men's basketball tournament.

== Seeds ==
Teams were seeded by record within the conference, with a tie–breaker system to seed teams with identical conference records. Only the top eight teams in the conference qualified for the tournament. Both Alabama State and Alabama A&M are currently ineligible for postseason play per SWAC regulations.

Seed	School	Conference	Tiebreaker 1
1	Prairie View A&M	13–0	More conference wins than JSU (even though both teams 1.000)
2	Jackson State	11–0	
3	Texas Southern	10–3	
4	Grambling State	9–6	
5	Southern	8–6	
6	Alcorn State	6–7	
7	Arkansas-Pine Bluff	3–12	
8	Mississippi Valley State	2–13	

== Schedule ==
Game	Time*	Matchup^{#}	Score	Television
Quarterfinals – Wednesday, March 10, 2021
1	2:00 p.m.	No. 2 Jackson State vs. No. 7 Arkansas-Pine Bluff	74–62	ESPN3
2	8:30 p.m.	No. 1 Prairie View A&M vs. No. 8 Mississippi Valley State	91–64	ESPN3
Quarterfinals – Thursday, March 11, 2021
3	2:00 p.m.	No. 3 Texas Southern vs. No. 6 Alcorn State	78–55	ESPN3
4	8:30 p.m.	No. 4 Grambling State vs. No. 5 Southern	72–67 ^{OT}	ESPN3
Semifinals – Friday, March 12, 2021
5	2:00 p.m.	No. 2 Jackson State vs. No. 3 Texas Southern	81–84^{OT}	ESPN3
6	8:30 p.m.	No. 1 Prairie View A&M vs. No. 4 Grambling State	74–63	ESPN3
Championship – Saturday, March 13, 2021
7	5:00 p.m.	No. 1 Prairie View A&M vs. No. 3 Texas Southern	61–80	ESPNU
*Game times in CDT. #-Rankings denote tournament seeding.

== Bracket ==
Quarterfinals; March 10–11; ESPN3
1	Prairie View A&M	91
8	Mississippi Valley State	64
4	Grambling State	72*
5	Southern	67
2	Jackson State	74
7	Arkansas-Pine Bluff	62
3	Texas Southern	78
6	Alcorn State	55

Semifinals; March 12; ESPN3
1	Prairie View A&M	74
4	Grambling State	63
2	Jackson State	81
3	Texas Southern	84*

Championship; March 13; ESPNU
1	Prairie View A&M	61
3	Texas Southern	80

* denotes overtime period

== See also ==
- 2021 SWAC women's basketball tournament
- SWAC men's basketball tournament
