= Harrison HPER Complex =

Arena in Itta Bena, Mississippi, US

R.W. Harrison HPER Complex
- New Gym
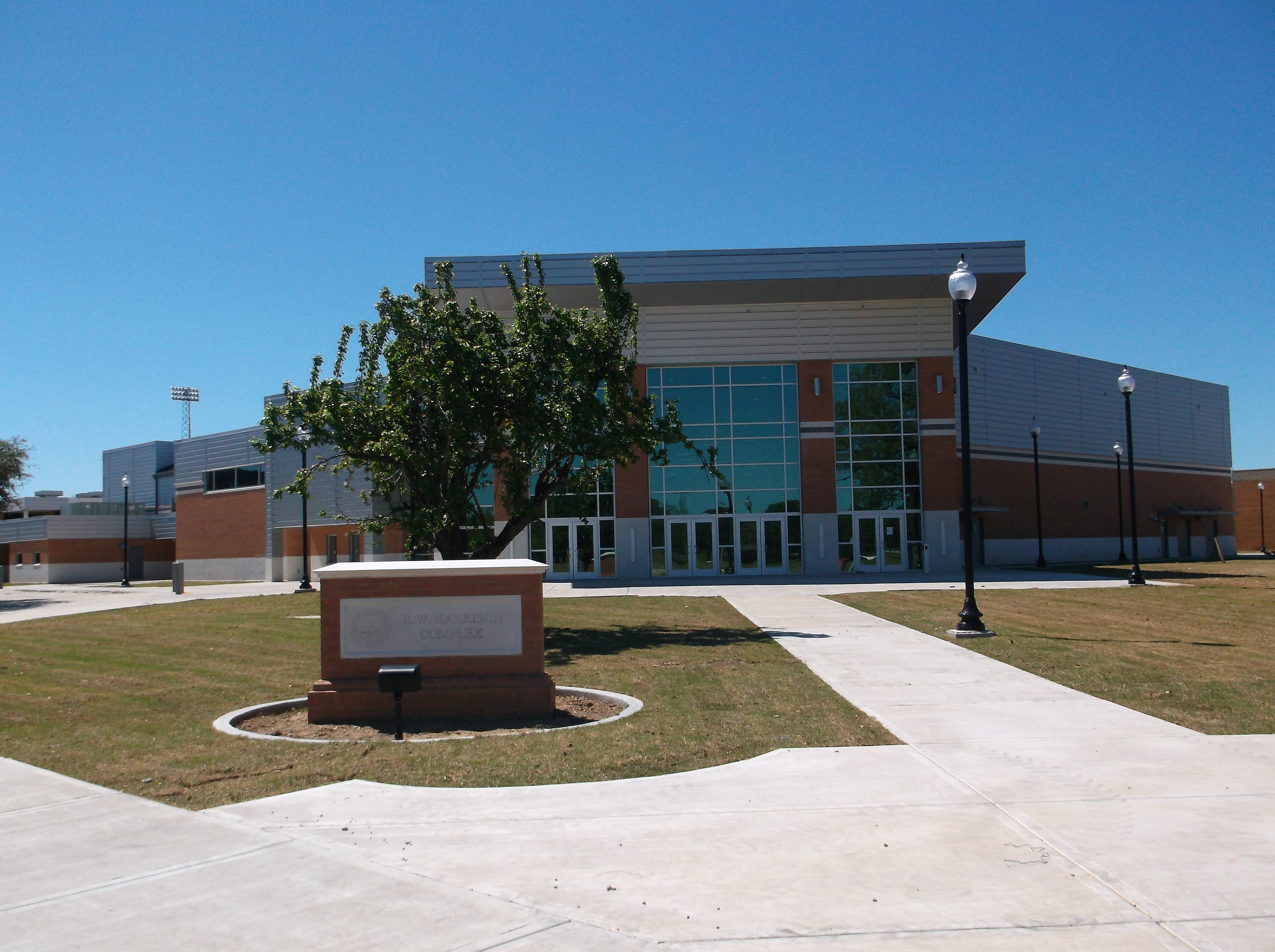
- Interactive map of R.W. Harrison HPER Complex
- Location: Mississippi Valley State University; Itta Bena, Mississippi
- Coordinates: 33.510656°N 90.340883°W
- Owner: Mississippi Valley State University
- Operator: Mississippi Valley State University
- Capacity: 5,000
- Surface: Maple flooring

Construction
- Opened: 1977
- Cost: $17.5 million (renovation and expansion completed in 2016)
- Architects: Pryor & Morrow Architects And Engineers

Tenants
- Mississippi Valley State Delta Devils and Devilettes (men's & women's basketball, women's volleyball)

R.W. Harrison HPER Complex is a 5,000-seat multi-purpose arena in Itta Bena, Mississippi. Constructed in 1977, it is home to the Mississippi Valley State University Delta Devils basketball and women's volleyball teams.

In 2016, $17.5 million worth of upgrades were completed to further modernize the facility and add technology classrooms.

== Gallery ==
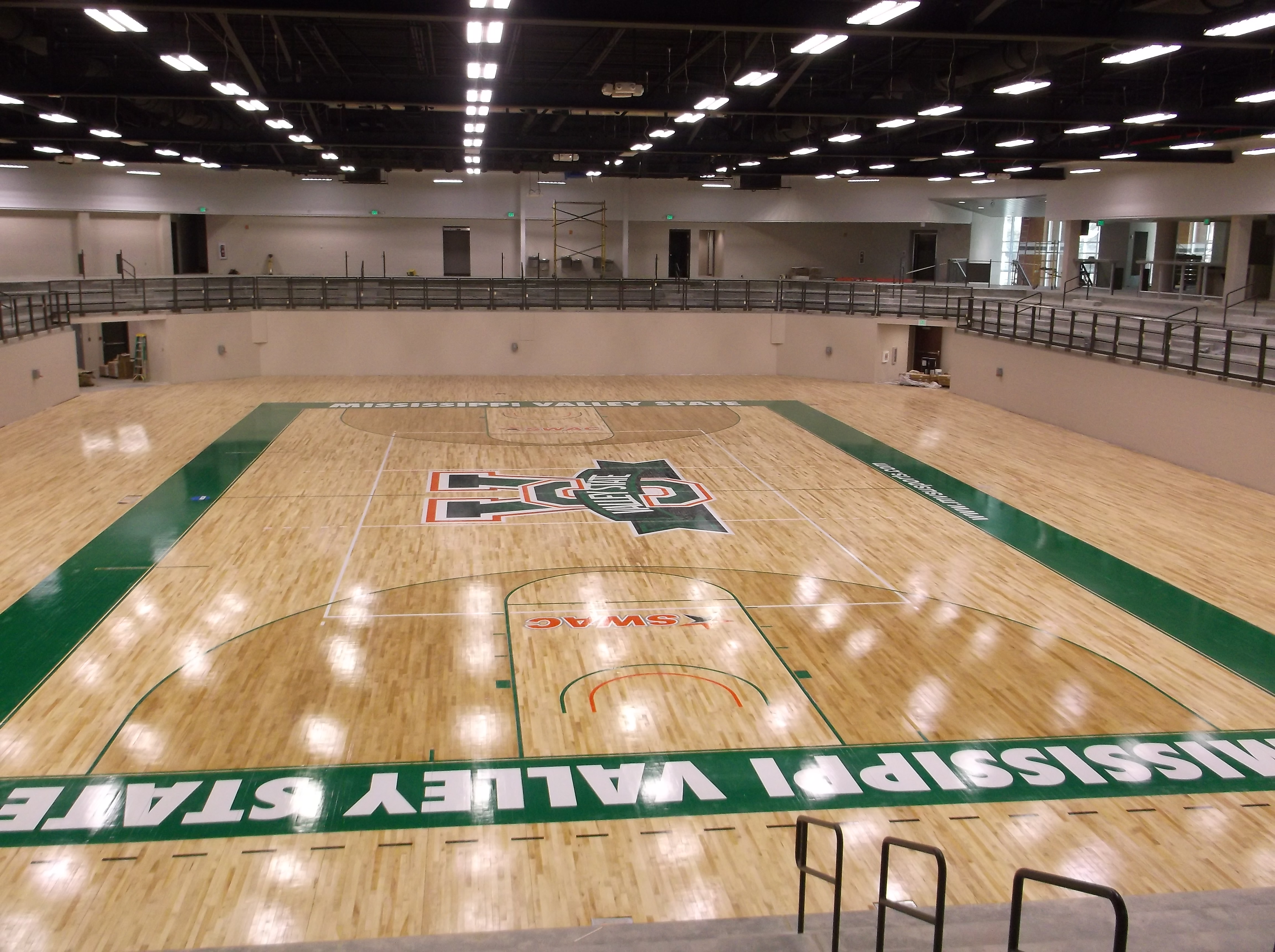
Renovated gym floor inside of Harrison HPER Complex

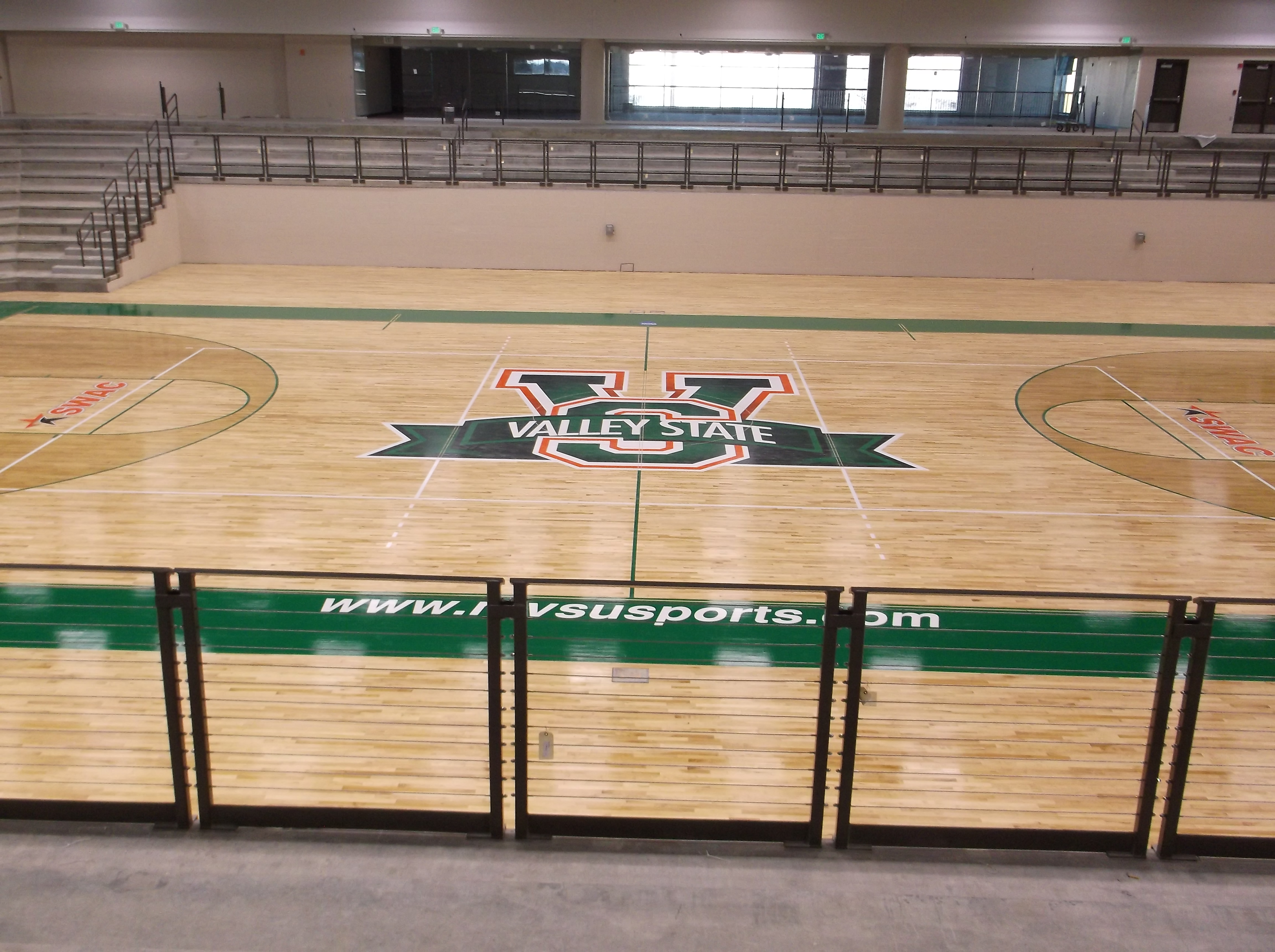
Renovated gym floor inside of Harrison HPER Complex

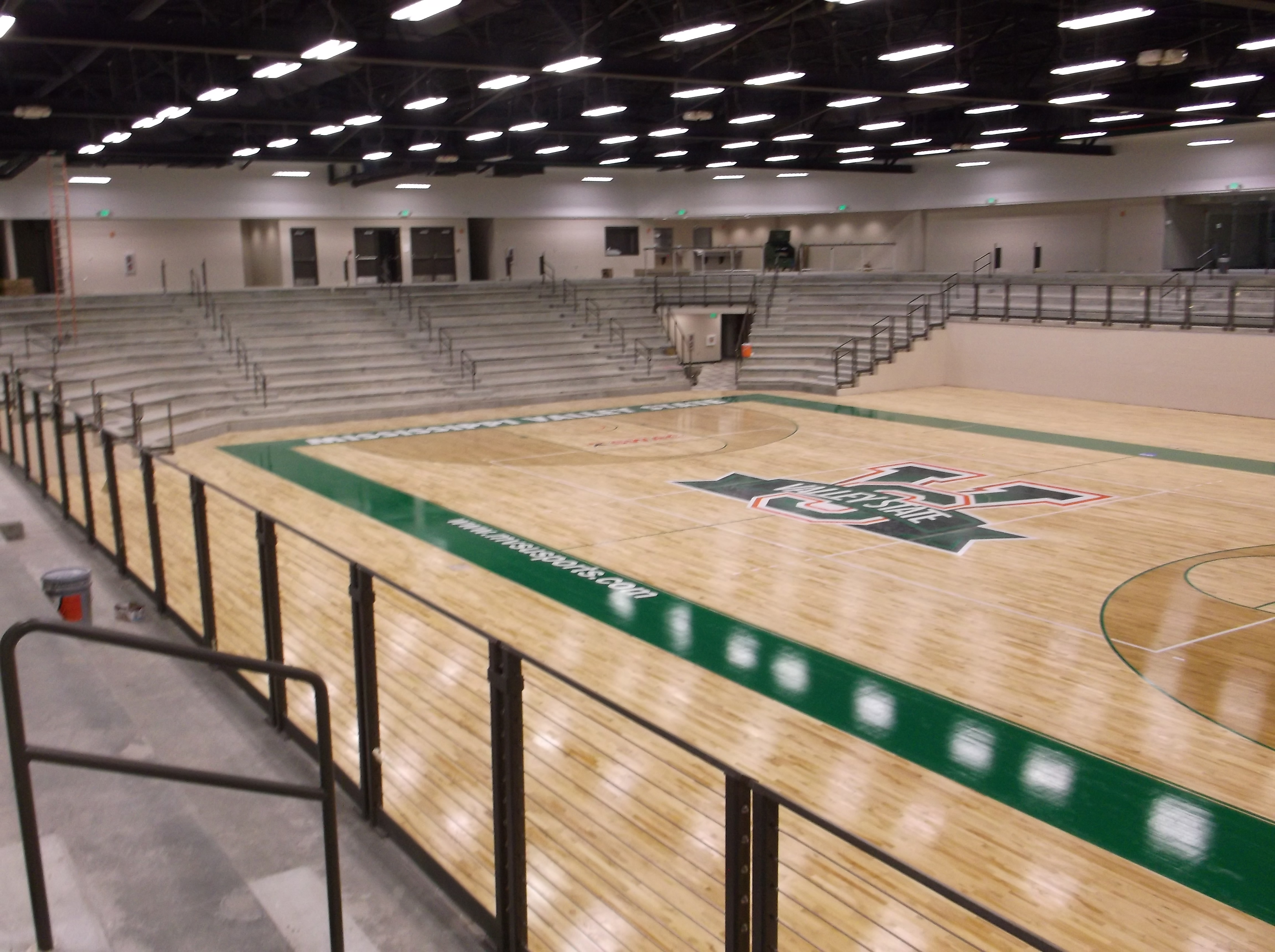
Renovated gym floor inside of Harrison HPER Complex

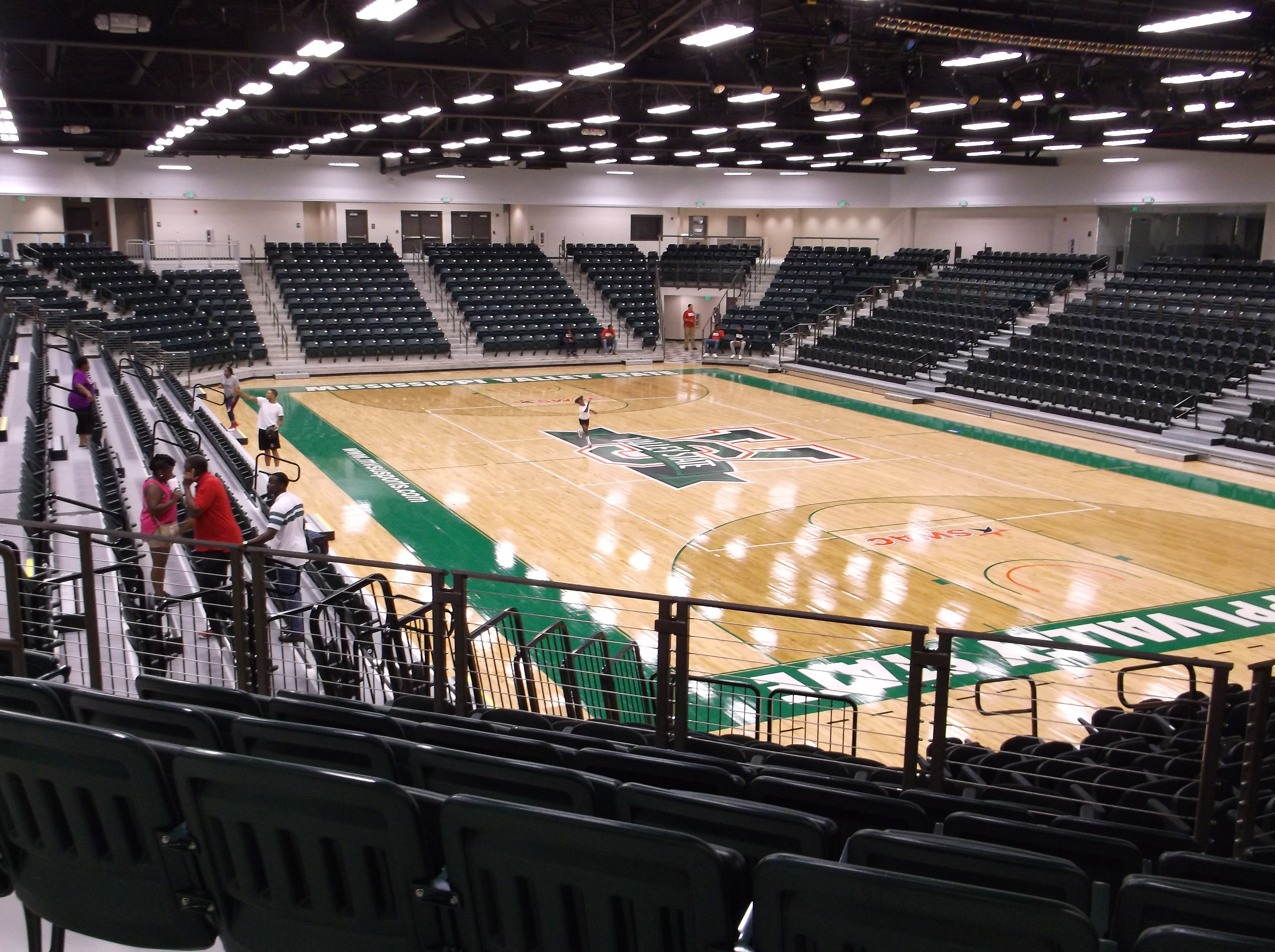
Renovated gym floor inside of Harrison HPER Complex with seats installed

== See also ==
- List of NCAA Division I basketball arenas
