= Williams Assembly Center =

Arena in Jackson, Mississippi

Coordinates: 32.299724°N 90.211887°W

Lee E. Williams Athletic Center
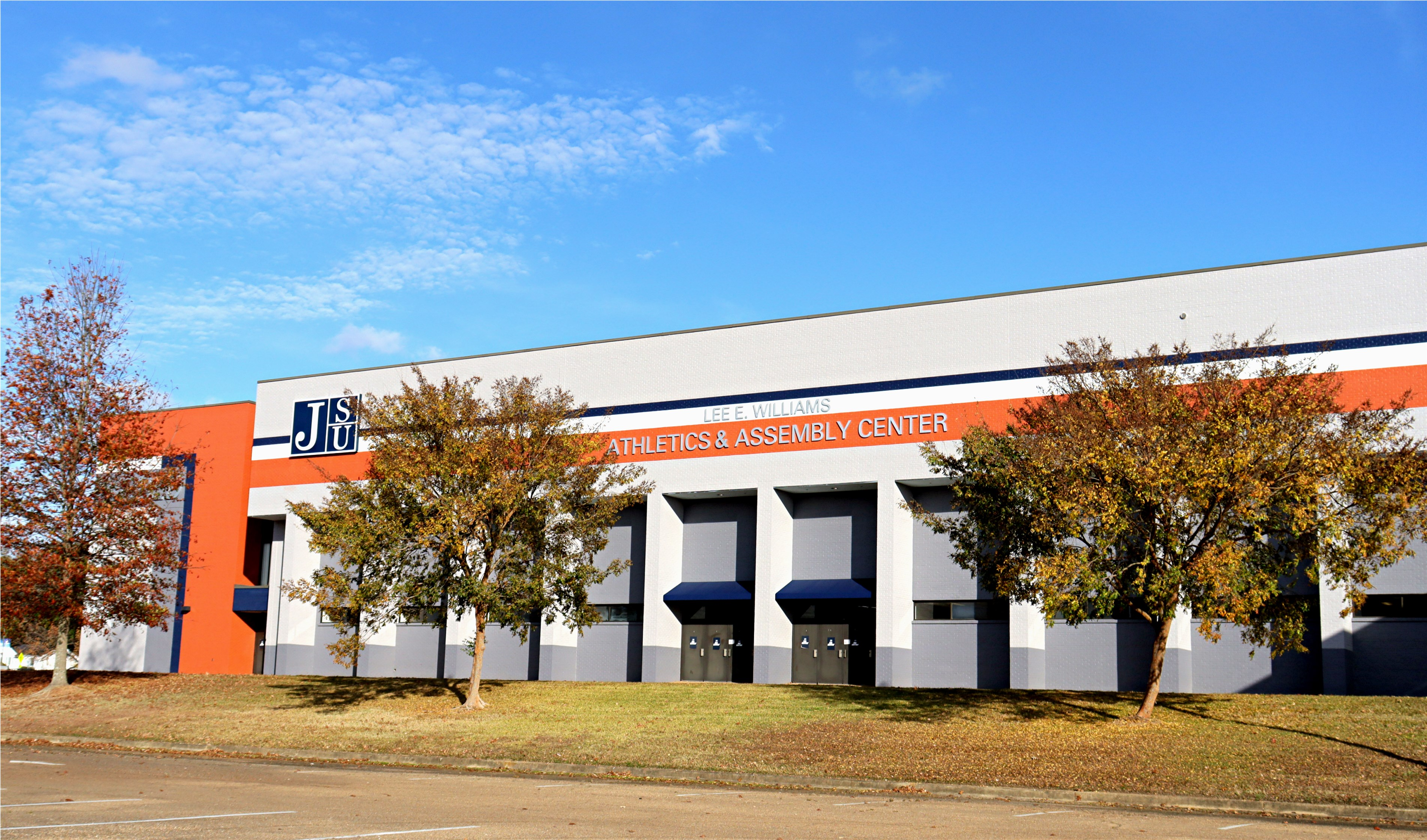
- Exterior of the stadium in 2021
- Interactive map of Lee E. Williams Athletic Center
- Full name: Lee E. Williams Athletic and Assembly Center
- Location: 1400 J.R. Lynch Street, Jackson, MS 39217
- Owner: Jackson State University
- Capacity: 8000

Construction
- Opened: 1981

Lee E. Williams Assembly Center is an 8,000-seat multi-purpose arena located on Jackson State University's campus in Jackson, Mississippi. It was built in 1981 and is home to the Jackson State Tigers women's and men's basketball teams.

It will be renovated in a few years by Durrell Design Group, and the renovations are currently in the planning process. The renovations will consist of new signage added, blue, red and white added to the exterior, renovation of the men's and women's locker rooms and addition of player lounges for men's and women's basketball.

== See also ==
- List of NCAA Division I basketball arenas
