= Health and Physical Education Arena =

Multi-purpose arena in Houston, Texas

H&PE Arena
- Health and Physical Education Arena
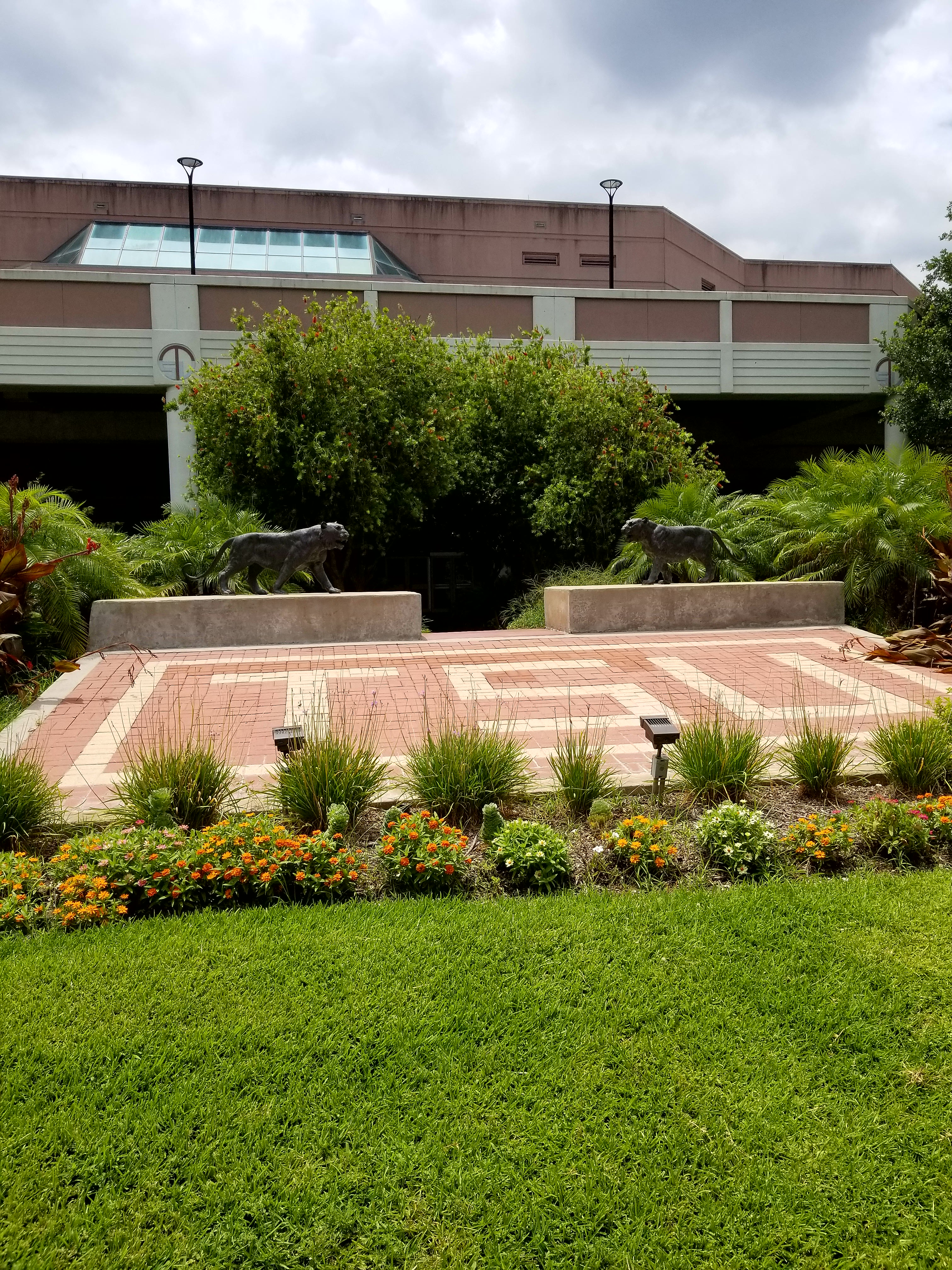
- The front of the H&PE Arena, 2017
- Interactive map of H&PE Arena
- Location: Houston, Texas
- Coordinates: 29°43′22″N 95°21′55″W
- Operator: Texas Southern University
- Capacity: 8,100

Construction
- Opened: 1989

Tenants
- Texas Southern Tigers; Houston Cougars (2017–18)

Health and Physical Education Arena (H&PE Arena) is an 8,100-seat multi-purpose arena in Houston, Texas on the campus of Texas Southern University.

It was designed by Houston architect Willie C. Jordan Jr. and built in 1989 and is home to the Texas Southern University Tigers basketball and volleyball teams. The arena played host to Houston Cougars men's basketball games during the 2017–18 season, as well as all Houston Cougars women's basketball home games in the same season, due to renovations of their arena, and hosted both teams for the first month of the 2018–19 season due to construction delays to the Cougars' home arena. Originally, the plan was to play most of the Cougars' men's conference games as well as a non-conference game against Arkansas at Toyota Center, with the remainder of the games at TSU. However, all of the games were eventually scheduled for H&PE Arena. H&PE Arena had previously hosted Houston's first-round game against Akron in the 2017 National Invitation Tournament due to the renovations at UH. The arena also hosted home games during the 2018 JBA season for the Houston Ballers of the Junior Basketball Association.

The H&PE Arena hosted a Democratic presidential debate on September 12, 2019, as well as a one-one-one pickup basketball charity game between U.S. Senator Ted Cruz and late-night talk show host Jimmy Kimmel.

== See also ==
- List of NCAA Division I basketball arenas
