= William J. Nicks Building =

Arena in Prairie View, Texas

William Nicks Building
- Baby Dome
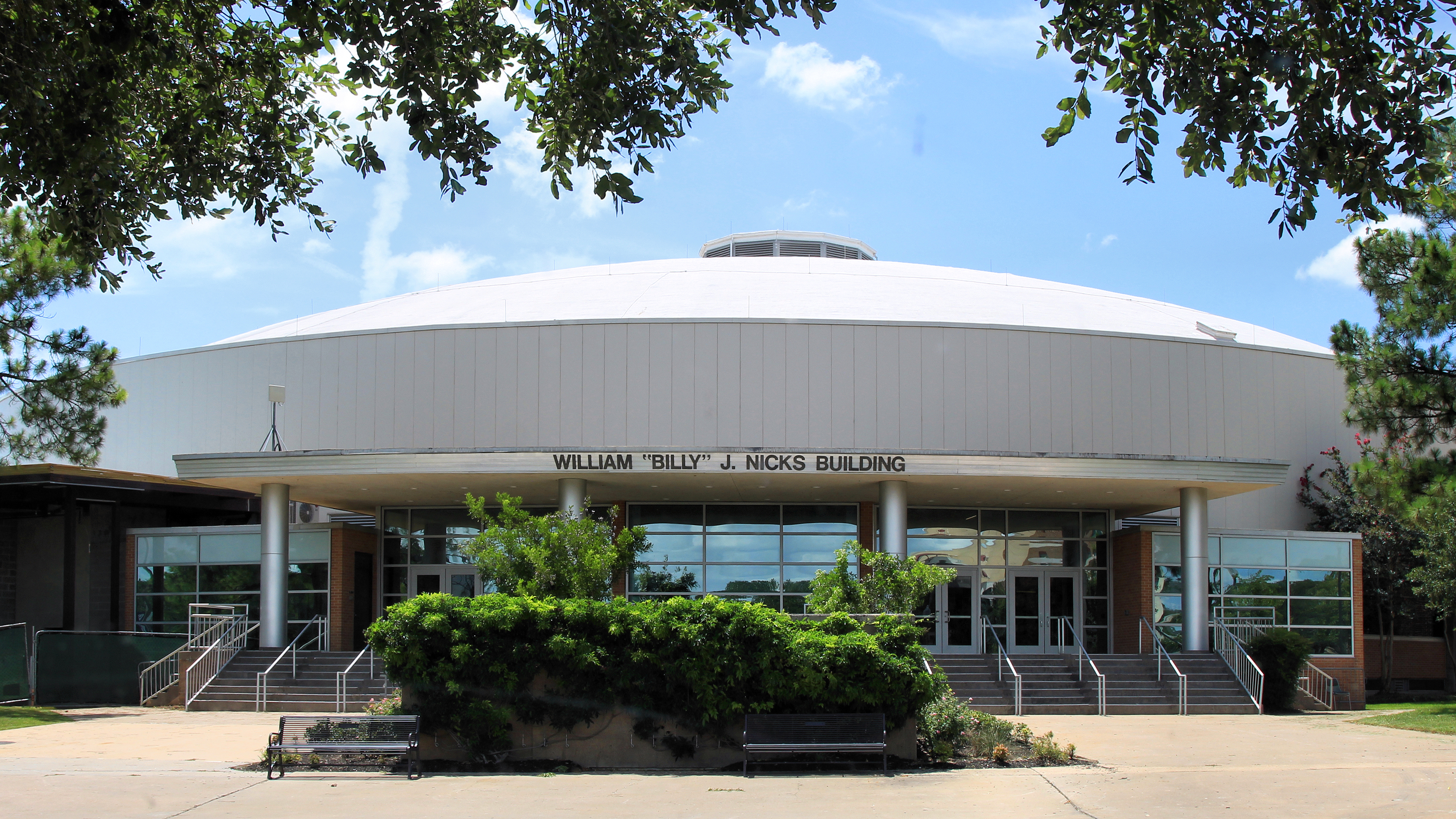
- Interactive map of William Nicks Building
- Location: 100 University Drive; Prairie View, Texas 77446
- Coordinates: 30°05′32.2″N 95°59′35.1″W
- Owner: Prairie View A&M University
- Operator: Prairie View A&M University
- Capacity: 4,000 + SRO
- Surface: Multi-surface

Construction
- Groundbreaking: 1964
- Built: 1964
- Renovated: 2011, 2012, 2014

Tenants
- Prairie View A&M Panthers basketball Prairie View A&M Lady Panthers basketball

The William Nicks Building is a 4,000-seat multi-purpose arena in Prairie View, Texas. It is home to the Prairie View A&M University Panthers basketball team, volleyball team, and commencement. It is named for Billy Nicks, the school's longtime football coach and athletic director. As part of renovation projects in 2011–2012, every seat is chairback. Locker rooms were renovated in 2014. The building is nicknamed the "Baby Dome" as a result of its structural configuration.

== See also ==
- List of NCAA Division I basketball arenas
