= List of Alcorn State Braves basketball head coaches =

The following is a list of Alcorn State Braves basketball head coaches. The Braves have had 15 coaches in their 81-season history.

Alcorn State's current head coach is Jake Morton. He was hired in April 2020 to replace Landon Bussie, who took the head coaching job at Chicago State.

No.	Tenure	Coach	Years	Record	Pct.
1	1944–1945	H. M. Thompson	1	2–4	.333
2	1946–1948	L. T. Harris	2	28–9	.757
3	1948–1956	Dwight Fisher	8	190–100	.655
4	1956–1959	W. A. Broadus	3	49–40	.551
5	1959–1966	E. E. Simmons	7	123–76	.618
6	1966–1969	Bob Hopkins	3	70–12	.854
7	1969–1989; 1996–2003	Davey Whitney	27	508–292	.635
8	1989–1993	Lonnie Walker	4	37–77	.325
9	1993–1996	Sam Weaver	3	21–57	.269
10	2003–2008	Samuel West	5	44–103	.299
11	2008–2011	Larry Smith	3	12–78	.133
12	2011–2015	Luther Riley	4	38–91	.295
13	2015–2020	Montez Robinson	5	69–86	.445
14	2020–2025	Landon Bussie	5	66–83	.443
15	2025–present	Jake Morton	1	9–23	.281
Totals		15 coaches	81 seasons	1,266–1,131	.528
Records updated through end of 2025–26 season Source
