= 2019–20 Prairie View A&M Panthers basketball team =

American college basketball season

2019–20 Prairie View A&M Panthers men's basketball
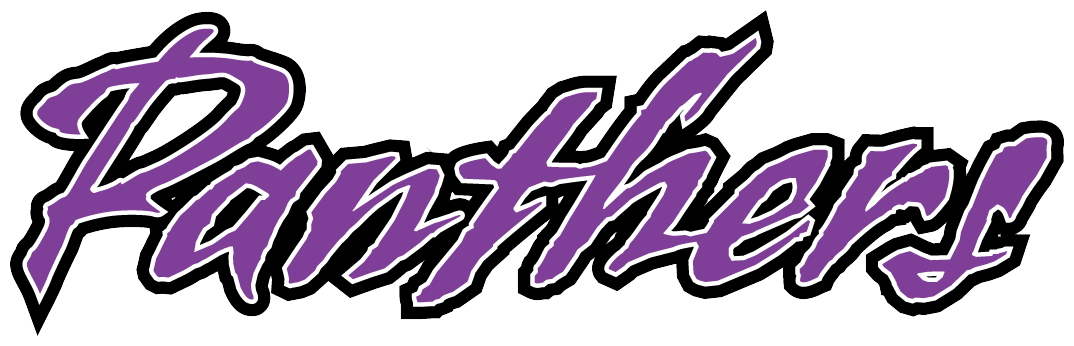

SWAC regular season champions
- Conference: Southwestern Athletic Conference
- Record: 19–13 (14–4 SWAC)
- Head coach: Byron Smith (4th season)
- Assistant coaches: Landon Bussie; Wendell Moore; Spencer Robertson
- Home arena: William Nicks Building

2019–20 SWAC men's basketball standings
| | Conf. | | | | Overall |
| Team | W | | L | PCT | W | | L | PCT |
|---|---|---|---|---|---|---|---|---|
| Prairie View A&M | 14 | – | 4 | .778 | 19 | – | 13 | .594 |
| Southern | 13 | – | 5 | .722 | 17 | – | 15 | .531 |
| Texas Southern | 12 | – | 6 | .667 | 16 | – | 16 | .500 |
| Grambling State | 11 | – | 7 | .611 | 17 | – | 15 | .531 |
| Jackson State | 11 | – | 7 | .611 | 15 | – | 17 | .469 |
| Alcorn State | 11 | – | 7 | .611 | 15 | – | 15 | .500 |
| Alabama State | 7 | – | 11 | .389 | 8 | – | 24 | .250 |
| Alabama A&M | 5 | – | 13 | .278 | 8 | – | 22 | .267 |
| Arkansas–Pine Bluff | 3 | – | 15 | .167 | 4 | – | 26 | .133 |
| Mississippi Valley State | 3 | – | 15 | .167 | 3 | – | 27 | .100 |
Note: The 2020 SWAC tournament was canceled prior to the semifinals due to the COVID-19 pandemic.

The 2019–20 Prairie View A&M Panthers basketball team represented Prairie View A&M University in the 2019–20 NCAA Division I men's basketball season. The Panthers, led by fourth-year head coach Byron Smith, played their home games at the William Nicks Building in Prairie View, Texas as members of the Southwestern Athletic Conference. They finished the season 19–13, 14–4 in SWAC play to be regular season SWAC champions. They defeated Alabama A&M in the quarterfinals of the SWAC tournament and were set to take on Jackson State in the semifinal before the tournament was cancelled amid the COVID-19 pandemic. With the SWAC Tournament cancelled, they were awarded the SWAC's automatic bid to the NCAA tournament. However, the NCAA Tournament was also cancelled.

== Previous season ==
The Panthers finished the 2018–19 season 22–13 overall, 17–1 in SWAC play, to finish as SWAC regular season champions. In the SWAC tournament, they defeated Alcorn State in the quarterfinals, Grambling State in the semifinals advancing to the championship game, where they defeated Texas Southern, earning the SWAC's automatic bid into the NCAA tournament. In the NCAA Tournament, they were matched up against Fairleigh Dickinson in the First Four, resulting in a 76–82 loss for the Panthers.

== Roster ==
2019–20 Prairie View A&M Panthers men's basketball team
Players
Coaches

| Pos. | # | Name | Height | Weight | Year | Hometown |
|---|---|---|---|---|---|---|
| F | 0 | Lenell Henry | 6 ft 8 in (2.03 m) | 200 lb (91 kg) | Jr | Chicago, Illinois |
| G | 1 | Dajuan Madden | 6 ft 2 in (1.88 m) | 185 lb (84 kg) | Jr | Baltimore, Maryland |
| G | 2 | Darius Williams | 6 ft 0 in (1.83 m) | 176 lb (80 kg) | Sr | Augusta, Georgia |
| G | 3 | Chancellor Ellis | 6 ft 4 in (1.93 m) | 185 lb (84 kg) | RS Sr | Queens, New York |
| G | 4 | Antione Lister | 6 ft 3 in (1.91 m) | 165 lb (75 kg) | Sr | Brenham, Texas |
| G | 5 | Tamir Bynum | 6 ft 1 in (1.85 m) | 160 lb (73 kg) | So | Houston, Texas |
| G | 10 | Javen Hedgeman | 6 ft 4 in (1.93 m) | 190 lb (86 kg) | Jr | Houston, Texas |
| G | 11 | DeWayne Cox | 6 ft 2 in (1.88 m) | 190 lb (86 kg) | Jr | Ripley, Mississippi |
| G | 12 | Faite Williams | 6 ft 2 in (1.88 m) | 175 lb (79 kg) | So | Dickinson, Texas |
| F | 13 | Caleb Coleman | 6 ft 7 in (2.01 m) | 196 lb (89 kg) | Jr | Hammond, Indiana |
| G | 14 | Leon Sneed | 6 ft 2 in (1.88 m) | 175 lb (79 kg) | Sr | DeSoto, Texas |
| G | 15 | Gerard Andrus | 6 ft 5 in (1.96 m) | 192 lb (87 kg) | Sr | Lafayette, Louisiana |
| G | 21 | Walter Covington, IV | 6 ft 3 in (1.91 m) | 200 lb (91 kg) | Jr | Lake Wales, Florida |
| G | 22 | Jawaun Daniels | 6 ft 7 in (2.01 m) | 190 lb (86 kg) | Jr | Harlem, New York |
| F | 23 | Devonte Patterson | 6 ft 7 in (2.01 m) | 205 lb (93 kg) | Sr | Bridgeport, Texas |
| G | 24 | Murray Grant | 6 ft 1 in (1.85 m) | 165 lb (75 kg) | Fr | Fulshear, Texas |
| G | 32 | Danario Edgar, II | 6 ft 1 in (1.85 m) | 165 lb (75 kg) | Fr | Bellaire, Texas |
| F | 35 | Jonathan Jackson | 6 ft 6 in (1.98 m) | 200 lb (91 kg) | Jr | Everman, Texas |

Head coach

- Byron Smith (Houston)

Assistant coach(es)

- Landon Bussie (Xavier (LA))
- Wendell Moore (Georgia Southern)
- Spencer Robertson (Wichita State)

Legend

- (C) Team captain
- (S) Suspended
- (I) Ineligible
- (W) Walk-on
- Injured
- Current redshirt

Roster
Last update: December 5, 2019

== Schedule and results ==
| Date time, TV | Rank^{#} | Opponent^{#} | Result | Record | Site (attendance) city, state |
Non-conference regular season
| November 5, 2019*; 7:00 pm | | Jarvis Christian | W 100–62 | 1–0 | William Nicks Building (2,202); Prairie View, TX |
| November 9, 2019*; 3:00 pm, ESPN3 | | at UCF | L 69–73 | 1–1 | Addition Financial Arena (4,972); Orlando, FL |
| November 12, 2019*; 7:00 pm, ESPN+ | | at Texas State | L 48–75 | 1–2 | Strahan Arena (2,889); San Marcos, TX |
| November 15, 2019*; 7:00 pm, LHN | | at Texas; 2K Empire Classic campus-site game | L 56–70 | 1–3 | Frank Erwin Center (8,670); Austin, TX |
| November 18, 2019*; 9:00 pm | | at California; 2K Empire Classic campus-site game | L 50–54 | 1–4 | Haas Pavilion (2,242); Berkeley, CA |
| November 22, 2019*; 6:30 pm | | vs. Georgia State; 2K Empire Classic subregional semifinals | L 74–83 | 1–5 | CBU Events Center (237); Riverside, CA |
| November 23, 2019*; 6:30 pm | | vs. Central Arkansas; 2K Empire Classic subregional 3rd-place game | W 78–72 ^{OT} | 2–5 | CBU Events Center (492); Riverside, CA |
| November 30, 2019*; 7:00 pm | | at UTSA | W 79–72 | 3–5 | Convocation Center (888); San Antonio, TX |
| December 11, 2019*; 9:00 pm, P12N | | at Arizona State | L 79–88 | 3–6 | Desert Financial Arena (6,889); Tempe, AZ |
| December 13, 2019*; 9:00 pm | | at Loyola Marymount | L 76–79 | 3–7 | Gersten Pavilion (673); Los Angeles, CA |
| December 19, 2019*; 7:30 pm, P12N | | at Colorado | L 64–83 | 3–8 | CU Events Center (6,082); Boulder, CO |
| December 22, 2019*; 3:30 pm, FS1 | | at Seton Hall | L 55–75 | 3–9 | Prudential Center (8,879); Newark, NJ |
| December 30, 2019*; 4:30 pm | | Huston–Tillotson | W 92–77 | 4–9 | William Nicks Building (136); Prairie View, TX |
SWAC regular season
| January 4, 2020; 5:30 pm | | Alcorn State | W 84–70 | 5–9 (1–0) | William Nicks Building (176); Prairie View, TX |
| January 6, 2020; 7:30 pm, ESPNU | | Southern | W 64–54 | 6–9 (2–0) | William Nicks Building (1,435); Prairie View, TX |
| January 11, 2020; 7:30 pm | | at Texas Southern | L 67–71 | 6–10 (2–1) | H&PE Arena (5,107); Houston, TX |
| January 18, 2020; 5:30 pm | | at Grambling State | W 64–57 | 7–10 (3–1) | Fredrick C. Hobdy Assembly Center (1,506); Grambling, LA |
| January 20, 2020; 7:30 pm | | at Jackson State | W 74–60 | 8–10 (4–1) | Williams Assembly Center (497); Jackson, MS |
| January 25, 2020; 5:30 pm | | Arkansas–Pine Bluff | W 67–54 | 9–10 (5–1) | William Nicks Building (346); Prairie View, TX |
| January 27, 2020; 7:30 pm | | Mississippi Valley State | W 102–83 | 10–10 (6–1) | William Nicks Building (1,522); Prairie View, TX |
| February 1, 2020; 5:00 pm | | at Alabama State | L 49–52 | 10–11 (6–2) | Dunn–Oliver Acadome (1,012); Montgomery, AL |
| February 3, 2020; 7:30 pm | | at Alabama A&M | W 69–54 | 11–11 (7–2) | Elmore Gymnasium (1,187); Normal, AL |
| February 8, 2020; 5:30 pm | | Texas Southern | W 69–59 | 12–11 (8–2) | William Nicks Building (7,843); Prairie View, TX |
| February 15, 2020; 5:30 pm | | Grambling State | W 75–69 | 13–11 (9–2) | William Nicks Building (389); Prairie View, TX |
| February 17, 2020; 7:30 pm, ESPNU | | Jackson State | W 70–61 | 14–11 (10–2) | William Nicks Building (1,250); Prairie View, TX |
| February 22, 2020; 7:30 pm | | at Arkansas–Pine Bluff | W 69–61 | 15–11 (11–2) | K. L. Johnson Complex (1,465); Pine Bluff, AR |
| February 24, 2020; 7:30 pm | | at Mississippi Valley State | W 88–69 | 16–11 (12–2) | Harrison HPER Complex (987); Itta Bena, MS |
| February 29, 2020; 5:30 pm | | Alabama State | W 65–58 | 17–11 (13–2) | William Nicks Building (1,059); Prairie View, TX |
| March 2, 2020; 7:30 pm | | Alabama A&M | W 73–62 | 18–11 (14–2) | William Nicks Building (796); Prairie View, TX |
| March 5, 2020; 7:30 pm | | at Alcorn State | L 71–80 | 18–12 (14–3) | Davey Whitney Complex (395); Lorman, MS |
| March 7, 2020; 5:30 pm | | at Southern | L 80–89 ^{OT} | 18–13 (14–4) | F. G. Clark Center (4,275); Baton Rouge, LA |
SWAC tournament
| March 10, 2020; 5:30 pm, ESPN3 | (1) | (8) Alabama A&M; Quarterfinals | W 82–60 | 19–13 | William Nicks Building (789); Prairie View, TX |
| March 13, 2020; 2:30 pm, ESPN3 | (1) | vs. (4) Jackson State; Semifinals | Cancelled due to the COVID-19 pandemic | | Bartow Arena; Birmingham, AL |
*Non-conference game. ^{#}Rankings from AP Poll. (#) Tournament seedings in parentheses. All times are in Central.
