= 2019–20 Grambling State Tigers men's basketball team =

American college basketball season

2019–20 Grambling State Tigers men's basketball
- Conference: Southwestern Athletic Conference
- Record: 17–15 (11–7 SWAC)
- Head coach: Donte Jackson (3rd season)
- Assistant coaches: Winston Hines; Demetrius Moore; Kyle Jones
- Home arena: Fredrick C. Hobdy Assembly Center

2019–20 SWAC men's basketball standings
| | Conf. | | | | Overall |
| Team | W | | L | PCT | W | | L | PCT |
|---|---|---|---|---|---|---|---|---|
| Prairie View A&M | 14 | – | 4 | .778 | 19 | – | 13 | .594 |
| Southern | 13 | – | 5 | .722 | 17 | – | 15 | .531 |
| Texas Southern | 12 | – | 6 | .667 | 16 | – | 16 | .500 |
| Grambling State | 11 | – | 7 | .611 | 17 | – | 15 | .531 |
| Jackson State | 11 | – | 7 | .611 | 15 | – | 17 | .469 |
| Alcorn State | 11 | – | 7 | .611 | 15 | – | 15 | .500 |
| Alabama State | 7 | – | 11 | .389 | 8 | – | 24 | .250 |
| Alabama A&M | 5 | – | 13 | .278 | 8 | – | 22 | .267 |
| Arkansas–Pine Bluff | 3 | – | 15 | .167 | 4 | – | 26 | .133 |
| Mississippi Valley State | 3 | – | 15 | .167 | 3 | – | 27 | .100 |
Note: The 2020 SWAC tournament was canceled prior to the semifinals due to the COVID-19 pandemic.

The 2019–20 Grambling State Tigers men's basketball team represented Grambling State University in the 2019–20 NCAA Division I men's basketball season. The Tigers, led by third-year head coach Donte Jackson, played their home games at the Fredrick C. Hobdy Assembly Center in Grambling, Louisiana as members of the Southwestern Athletic Conference (SWAC). They finished the season 17–15, 11–7 in SWAC play, to finish in a three-way tie for fourth place. They lost in the quarterfinals of the SWAC tournament to Texas Southern.

== Previous season ==
The Tigers finished the 2018–19 season 17–17 overall, 10–8 in SWAC play, to finish in three-way tie for third place. In the SWAC tournament, they defeated Arkansas–Pine Bluff in the quarterfinals, before losing to Prairie View A&M in the semifinals. They were invited to the CIT, where they lost to Texas–Rio Grande Valley in the first round.

== Roster ==
2019–20 Grambling State Tigers men's basketball team
Players
Coaches

| Pos. | # | Name | Height | Weight | Year | Hometown |
|---|---|---|---|---|---|---|
| G | 0 | Trevell Cunningham | 6 ft 0 in (1.83 m) | 180 lb (82 kg) | Jr | Chicago, IL |
| G | 1 | Ivy Jr. Smith | 6 ft 0 in (1.83 m) | 165 lb (75 kg) | Sr | Tacoma, WA |
| G | 2 | Zahad Munford | 6 ft 3 in (1.91 m) | 170 lb (77 kg) | Fr | Dallas, TX |
| G | 3 | Josh Mullins | 6 ft 4 in (1.93 m) | 180 lb (82 kg) | So | Rocky Mount, NC |
| G | 4 | Anthony Gaston | 6 ft 4 in (1.93 m) | 205 lb (93 kg) | Sr | Richmond, VA |
| G | 5 | Tra'Michael Moton | 6 ft 1 in (1.85 m) | 170 lb (77 kg) | Fr | Shreveport, LA |
| G | 10 | Prince Moss | 6 ft 7 in (2.01 m) | 180 lb (82 kg) | RS Jr | Bessemer, AL |
| G | 11 | Kelton Edwards | 6 ft 6 in (1.98 m) | 195 lb (88 kg) | Jr | Dallas, TX |
| G | 12 | Cameron Christon | 6 ft 6 in (1.98 m) | 190 lb (86 kg) | RS So | Allen, TX |
| F | 21 | Terreon Randolph | 6 ft 8 in (2.03 m) | 220 lb (100 kg) | Jr | Dallas, TX |
| F | 23 | Jay Head | 6 ft 7 in (2.01 m) | 230 lb (104 kg) | RS So | Monroe, LA |
| C | 24 | Travon Bunch | 7 ft 1 in (2.16 m) | 230 lb (104 kg) | Sr | Racine, WI |
| F | 25 | DeVante Jackson | 6 ft 9 in (2.06 m) | 200 lb (91 kg) | Sr | Milwaukee, WI |
| G | 30 | Dearius Henyard | 6 ft 3 in (1.91 m) | 180 lb (82 kg) | So | Vicksburg, MS |
| G | 32 | David Loville | 6 ft 3 in (1.91 m) | 180 lb (82 kg) | Jr | San Francisco, CA |
| C | 33 | Chisom Obidike | 6 ft 10 in (2.08 m) | 230 lb (104 kg) | Jr | Uwani, Nigeria |

Head coach

- Donte Jackson (Central State)

Assistant coach(es)

- Winston Hines (Stillman)
- Demetrius Moore (Stillman)
- Kyle Jones (Arkansas–Pine Bluff)

Legend

- (C) Team captain
- (S) Suspended
- (I) Ineligible
- (W) Walk-on
- Injured
- Current redshirt

Roster
Last update: April 22, 2025

== Schedule and results ==
| Date time, TV | Rank^{#} | Opponent^{#} | Result | Record | Site (attendance) city, state |
Non-conference regular season
| November 6, 2019*; 7:00 p.m., ESPN3 | | East Texas Baptist | W 102–70 | 1–0 | Fredrick C. Hobdy Assembly Center; Grambling, LA |
| November 8, 2019*; 7:30 p.m. | | Ecclesia College | W 147–52 | 2–0 | Fredrick C. Hobdy Assembly Center (100); Grambling, LA |
| November 13, 2019*; 7:00 p.m. | | at Southeastern Louisiana | W 81–70 | 3–0 | University Center (814); Hammond, LA |
| November 20, 2019*; 9:00 p.m. | | at San Jose State | L 76–83 | 3–1 | Provident Credit Union Event Center (1,437); San Jose, CA |
| November 23, 2019*; 1:30 p.m., P12N | | at Oregon State; Las Vegas Holiday Classic | L 58–80 | 3–2 | Gill Coliseum (3,670); Corvallis, OR |
| November 26, 2019*; 2:00 p.m. | | vs. Portland State; Las Vegas Holiday Classic | L 74–84 | 3–3 | The Thunderdome (217); Santa Barbara, CA |
| November 29, 2019*; 9:00 p.m. | | at UC Santa Barbara; Las Vegas Holiday Classic | L 58–67 | 3–4 | The Thunderdome (1,039); Santa Barbara, CA |
| December 4, 2019*; 7:00 p.m. | | Paul Quinn | W 79–69 | 4–4 | Fredrick C. Hobdy Assembly Center; Grambling, LA |
| December 7, 2019*; 9:00 p.m. | | at Loyola Marymount | L 67-83 | 4–5 | Gersten Pavilion (889); Los Angeles, CA |
| December 10, 2019*; 7:00 p.m., ESPN+ | | at Louisiana–Monroe | W 66-61 | 5–5 | Fant–Ewing Coliseum (2,019); Monroe, LA |
| December 14, 2019*; 7:00 p.m. | | Rust | W 82–54 | 6–5 | Fredrick C. Hobdy Assembly Center (425); Grambling, LA |
| December 17, 2019*; 7:00 p.m., FSN | | at Marquette | L 72–93 | 6–6 | Fiserv Forum (13,898); Milwaukee, WI |
| December 23, 2019*; 6:00 p.m., ESPN+ | | at No. 18 Dayton | L 53–81 | 6–7 | UD Arena (13,407); Dayton, OH |
SWAC regular season
| January 4, 2020; 5:30 p.m. | | Alabama A&M | W 70–60 | 7–7 (1–0) | Fredrick C. Hobdy Assembly Center (738); Grambling, LA |
| January 6, 2020; 7:30 p.m. | | Alabama State | W 68–63 | 8–7 (2–0) | Fredrick C. Hobdy Assembly Center (750); Grambling, LA |
| January 11, 2020; 5:30 p.m. | | at Southern | W 61–56 | 9–7 (3–0) | F. G. Clark Center (4,579); Baton Rouge, LA |
| January 13, 2020; 7:30 p.m. | | at Alcorn State | L 69–87 | 9–8 (3–1) | Davey Whitney Complex (277); Lorman, MS |
| January 18, 2020; 5:30 p.m. | | Prairie View A&M | L 57–64 | 9–9 (3–2) | Fredrick C. Hobdy Assembly Center (1,506); Grambling, LA |
| January 20, 2020; 7:30 p.m. | | Texas Southern | L 61–68 | 9–10 (3–3) | Fredrick C. Hobdy Assembly Center (2,836); Grambling, LA |
| January 25, 2020; 5:30 p.m. | | at Jackson State | L 53–71 | 9–11 (3–4) | Williams Assembly Center (267); Jackson, MS |
| February 1, 2020; 7:30 p.m. | | at Arkansas–Pine Bluff | W 49–47 | 10–11 (4–4) | K. L. Johnson Complex (3,146); Pine Bluff, AR |
| February 3, 2020; 7:30 p.m. | | at Mississippi Valley State | W 90–65 | 11–11 (5–4) | Harrison HPER Complex (906); Itta Bena, MS |
| February 8, 2020; 5:30 p.m. | | Southern | W 66–62 | 12–11 (6–4) | Fredrick C. Hobdy Assembly Center (1,698); Grambling, LA |
| February 10, 2020; 7:30 p.m. | | Alcorn State | W 80–71 | 13–11 (7–4) | Fredrick C. Hobdy Assembly Center (910); Grambling, LA |
| February 15, 2020; 5:30 p.m. | | at Prairie View A&M | L 69–75 | 13–12 (7–5) | William Nicks Building (389); Prairie View, TX |
| February 17, 2020; 7:30 p.m. | | at Texas Southern | L 79–93 | 13–13 (7–6) | H&PE Arena (1,884); Houston, TX |
| February 22, 2020; 7:30 p.m. | | Jackson State | W 63–61 | 14–13 (8–6) | Fredrick C. Hobdy Assembly Center (1,155); Grambling, LA |
| February 29, 2020; 5:30 p.m. | | Arkansas–Pine Bluff | W 60–46 | 15–13 (9–6) | Fredrick C. Hobdy Assembly Center (1,220); Grambling, LA |
| March 2, 2020; 7:30 p.m. | | Mississippi Valley State | W 81–61 | 16–13 (10–6) | Fredrick C. Hobdy Assembly Center (1,401); Grambling, LA |
| March 5, 2020; 7:30 p.m. | | at Alabama A&M | L 57–58 | 16–14 (10–7) | Elmore Gymnasium (936); Normal, AL |
| March 7, 2020; 5:30 p.m. | | at Alabama State | W 70–58 | 17–14 (11–7) | Dunn–Oliver Acadome (2,091); Montgomery, AL |
SWAC tournament
| March 10, 2020; 7:30 p.m., ESPN3 | (6) | at (3) Texas Southern; Quarterfinals | L 62–75 | 17–15 | H&PE Arena (1,544); Houston, TX |
*Non-conference game. ^{#}Rankings from AP poll. (#) Tournament seedings in parentheses. All times are in Central.
