= 2019–20 Southern Jaguars basketball team =

American college basketball season

2019–20 Southern Jaguars basketball
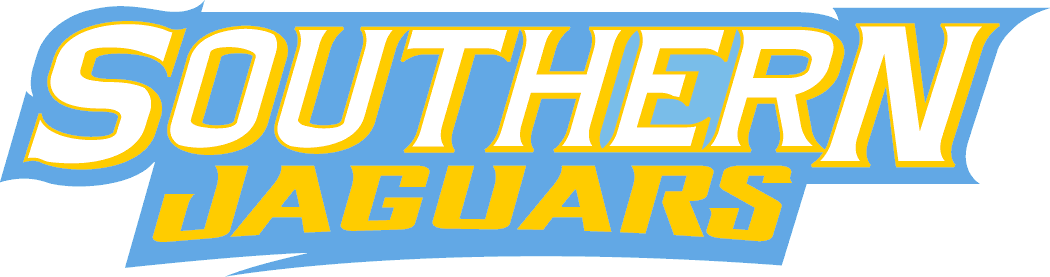
- Conference: Southwestern Athletic Conference
- Record: 17–15 (13–5 SWAC)
- Head coach: Sean Woods (2nd season)
- Assistant coaches: Ryan Price; Pedro Cipriano; Jethro Hillman; Martiese Morones
- Home arena: F. G. Clark Center

2019–20 SWAC men's basketball standings
	Conf.				Overall
Team	W		L	PCT	W		L	PCT
Prairie View A&M	14	–	4	.778	19	–	13	.594
Southern	13	–	5	.722	17	–	15	.531
Texas Southern	12	–	6	.667	16	–	16	.500
Grambling State	11	–	7	.611	17	–	15	.531
Jackson State	11	–	7	.611	15	–	17	.469
Alcorn State	11	–	7	.611	15	–	15	.500
Alabama State	7	–	11	.389	8	–	24	.250
Alabama A&M	5	–	13	.278	8	–	22	.267
Arkansas–Pine Bluff	3	–	15	.167	4	–	26	.133
Mississippi Valley State	3	–	15	.167	3	–	27	.100
Note: The 2020 SWAC tournament was canceled prior to the semifinals due to the COVID-19 pandemic.

The 2019–20 Southern Jaguars basketball team represented Southern University in the 2019–20 NCAA Division I men's basketball season. The Jaguars, led by second-year head coach Sean Woods, played their home games at the F. G. Clark Center in Baton Rouge, Louisiana as members of the Southwestern Athletic Conference. They finished the season 17–15, 13–5 in SWAC play to finish in second place. They defeated Alabama State in the quarterfinals of the SWAC tournament and were set to face Texas Southern in the semifinals until the tournament was cancelled amid the COVID-19 pandemic.

== Previous season ==
The Jaguars finished the 2018–19 season 7–25 overall, 6–12 in SWAC play, to finish in a tie for 7th place. In the SWAC tournament, they were defeated by Texas Southern in the quarterfinals.

== Roster ==
2019–20 Southern Jaguars men's basketball team
Players
Coaches

Pos.	#	Name	Height	Weight	Year	Hometown
F	0	Terrell Williams, Jr	6 ft 5 in (1.96 m)	200 lb (91 kg)	Fr	Arlington, Texas
G	1	Ahsante Shivers	6 ft 3 in (1.91 m)	205 lb (93 kg)	Jr	Seat Pleasant, Maryland
F	2	Damiree Burns	6 ft 6 in (1.98 m)	200 lb (91 kg)	Fr	New Orleans, Louisiana
F	3	Skyler Baggs	6 ft 6 in (1.98 m)	200 lb (91 kg)	Jr	Brunswick, Georgia
G	4	Isaiah Rollins	6 ft 3 in (1.91 m)	180 lb (82 kg)	So	Opelousas, Louisiana
G	5	Jayden Saddler	6 ft 0 in (1.83 m)	170 lb (77 kg)	So	Aberdeen, Maryland
G	10	Delor Johnson	6 ft 3 in (1.91 m)	180 lb (82 kg)	Fr	Houston, Texas
G	11	Montese Blake	5 ft 11 in (1.8 m)	170 lb (77 kg)	Jr	Atlanta, Georgia
F	12	Darius Williams	6 ft 9 in (2.06 m)	200 lb (91 kg)	Sr	Newark, New Jersey
G	13	Micah Bradford	6 ft 1 in (1.85 m)	175 lb (79 kg)	GS	Bourbonnais, Illinois
G	20	Lamarcus Lee	6 ft 2 in (1.88 m)	185 lb (84 kg)	RS Jr	Baton Rouge, Louisiana
G	21	Sam Mack	6 ft 4 in (1.93 m)	200 lb (91 kg)	Jr	Chicago, Illinois
C	23	James Edwards	6 ft 10 in (2.08 m)	200 lb (91 kg)	RS Jr	Seattle, Washington
F	24	Osa Wilson	6 ft 7 in (2.01 m)	225 lb (102 kg)	Jr	Toronto, Canada
PG	25	Brendon Brooks	5 ft 9 in (1.75 m)	160 lb (73 kg)	RS Jr	Dallas, Texas
C	35	Kirk Parker	6 ft 7 in (2.01 m)	250 lb (113 kg)	Jr	Vicksburg, Mississippi
C	40	Amel Kuljuhovic	6 ft 10 in (2.08 m)	240 lb (109 kg)	Sr	Waterloo, Iowa
F	42	Nico Hardin	6 ft 7 in (2.01 m)	210 lb (95 kg)	Fr	Houston, Texas

Head coach

- Sean Woods (Kentucky)

Assistant coach(es)

- Ryan Price (Henderson State)
- Pedro Cipriano (Southern)
- Jethro Hillman (Miami (FL))
- Martiese Morones (Kentucky)

Legend

- (C) Team captain
- (S) Suspended
- (I) Ineligible
- (W) Walk-on
- Injured
- Current redshirt

Roster
Last update: December 8, 2019

== Schedule and results ==
Date time, TV	Rank^{#}	Opponent^{#}	Result	Record	Site (attendance) city, state
Exhibition
October 25, 2019*; 7:00 pm		Wiley	W 78–57		F. G. Clark Center; Baton Rouge, LA
Non-conference regular season
November 6, 2019*; 6:30 pm		Loyola (New Orleans)	W 87–70	1–0	F. G. Clark Center (686); Baton Rouge, LA
November 9, 2019*; 7:00 pm, ESPN+		at Murray State	L 49–69	1–1	CFSB Center (3,709); Murray, KY
November 14, 2019*; 8:00 pm		at New Mexico State	L 63–79	1–2	Pan American Center (5,929); Las Cruces, NM
November 18, 2019*; 6:30 pm		Ecclesia	W 121–55	2–2	F. G. Clark Center (827); Baton Rouge, LA
November 22, 2019*; 7:00 pm, BTN+		at Nebraska	L 86–93 ^{OT}	2–3	Pinnacle Bank Arena (15,931); Lincoln, NE
November 25, 2019*; 7:00 pm		at Omaha; Cayman Islands Classic Mainland Tournament at Omaha	L 51–78	2–4	Baxter Arena (1,694); Omaha, NE
November 26, 2019*; 4:30 pm		vs. IUPUI; The Mainland Tournament at Omaha (Cayman Island Classic)	W 83–77	3–4	Baxter Arena (152); Omaha, NE
December 1, 2019*; 1:00 pm, ESPN3		at Tulane	L 65–82	3–5	Devlin Fieldhouse (1,745); New Orleans, LA
December 8, 2019*; 2:00 pm		at Akron	L 57–72	3–6	James A. Rhodes Arena (2,036); Akron, OH
December 12, 2019*; 7:00 pm, ESPN3		at Wright State	L 62–85	3–7	Nutter Center (3,012); Fairborn, OH
December 14, 2019*; 12:00 pm, FS1		at No. 18 Butler	L 41–66	3–8	Hinkle Fieldhouse (7,635); Indianapolis, IN
December 18, 2019*; 7:00 pm		at California Baptist	L 61–78	3–9	CBU Events Center (1,874); Riverside, CA
December 20, 2019*; 7:00 pm		at UC Santa Barbara	L 68–77	3–10	The Thunderdome (837); Riverside, CA
SWAC regular season
January 4, 2020; 7:30 pm		at Texas Southern	L 68–77	3–11 (0–1)	H&PE Arena (1,711); Houston, TX
January 6, 2020; 8:00 pm, ESPNU		at Prairie View A&M	L 54–64	3–12 (0–2)	William Nicks Building (1,435); Prairie View, TX
January 11, 2020; 5:30 pm		Grambling State	L 56–61	3–13 (0–3)	F. G. Clark Center (4,579); Baton Rouge, LA
January 13, 2020; 3:40 pm		Jackson State	W 56–50	4–13 (1–3)	F. G. Clark Center (2,401); Baton Rouge, LA
January 18, 2020; 7:00 pm		at Arkansas–Pine Bluff	W 75–56	5–13 (2–3)	K. L. Johnson Complex (1,165); Pine Bluff, AR
January 20, 2020; 7:30 pm		at Mississippi Valley State	W 74–70	6–13 (3–3)	Harrison HPER Complex (2,078); Itta Bena, MS
January 25, 2020; 5:30 pm		Alabama State	W 81–70	7–13 (4–3)	F. G. Clark Center (3,783); Baton Rouge, LA
January 27, 2020; 7:30 pm		Alabama A&M	W 67–46	8–13 (5–3)	F. G. Clark Center (4,127); Baton Rouge, LA
February 1, 2020; 5:30 pm		Alcorn State	W 93–82	9–13 (6–3)	F. G. Clark Center (4,286); Baton Rouge, LA
February 8, 2020; 5:30 pm		at Grambling State	L 62–66	9–14 (6–4)	Fredrick C. Hobdy Assembly Center (1,698); Grambling, LA
February 10, 2020; 8:00 pm, ESPNU		at Jackson State	L 51–67	9–15 (6–5)	Williams Assembly Center (1,029); Jackson, MS
February 15, 2020; 5:30 pm		Arkansas–Pine Bluff	W 73–49	10–15 (7–5)	F. G. Clark Center (3,989); Baton Rouge, LA
February 17, 2020; 7:30 pm		Mississippi Valley State	W 95–62	11–15 (8–5)	F. G. Clark Center (3,486); Baton Rouge, LA
February 22, 2020; 5:30 pm		at Alabama State	W 56–44	12–15 (9–5)	Dunn–Oliver Acadome (1,290); Montgomery, AL
February 24, 2020; 7:30 pm		at Alabama A&M	W 64–37	13–15 (10–5)	Elmore Gymnasium (1,024); Normal, AL
February 29, 2020; 5:30 pm		at Alcorn State	W 71–57	14–15 (11–5)	Davey Whitney Complex (453); Lorman, MS
March 5, 2020; 7:30 pm		Texas Southern	W 89–74	15–15 (12–5)	F. G. Clark Center (4,672); Baton Rouge, LA
March 7, 2020; 5:30 pm		Prairie View A&M	W 89–80 ^{OT}	16–15 (13–5)	F. G. Clark Center (4,275); Baton Rouge, LA
SWAC tournament
March 10, 2020; 7:30 pm, ESPN3	(2)	(7) Alabama State; Quarterfinals	W 67–53	17–15	F. G. Clark Center (4,758); Baton Rouge, LA
March 13, 2020; 8:30 pm, ESPN3	(2)	vs. (3) Texas Southern; Semifinals	Cancelled due to the COVID-19 pandemic		Bartow Arena; Birmingham, AL
*Non-conference game. ^{#}Rankings from AP Poll. (#) Tournament seedings in parentheses. All times are in Central.
