= 2019–20 Texas Southern Tigers basketball team =

American college basketball season

2019–20 Texas Southern Tigers basketball
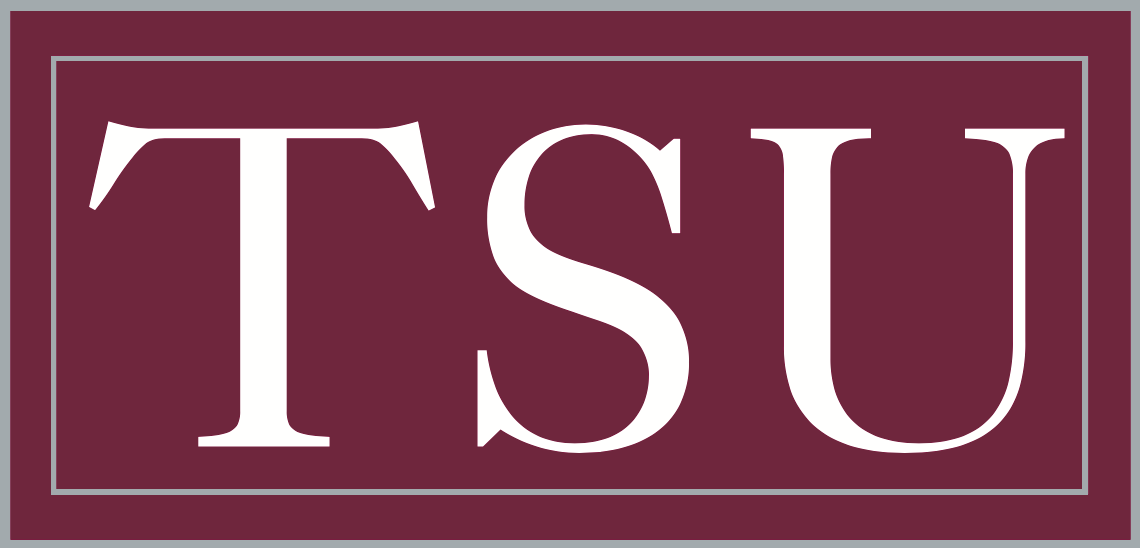
- Conference: Southwestern Athletic Conference
- Record: 16–16 (12–6 SWAC)
- Head coach: Johnny Jones (2nd season)
- Assistant coaches: Randy Peele; Shyrone Chatman; JD Williams; Brandon Chambers
- Home arena: Health and Physical Education Arena

2019–20 SWAC men's basketball standings
| | Conf. | | | | Overall |
| Team | W | | L | PCT | W | | L | PCT |
|---|---|---|---|---|---|---|---|---|
| Prairie View A&M | 14 | – | 4 | .778 | 19 | – | 13 | .594 |
| Southern | 13 | – | 5 | .722 | 17 | – | 15 | .531 |
| Texas Southern | 12 | – | 6 | .667 | 16 | – | 16 | .500 |
| Grambling State | 11 | – | 7 | .611 | 17 | – | 15 | .531 |
| Jackson State | 11 | – | 7 | .611 | 15 | – | 17 | .469 |
| Alcorn State | 11 | – | 7 | .611 | 15 | – | 15 | .500 |
| Alabama State | 7 | – | 11 | .389 | 8 | – | 24 | .250 |
| Alabama A&M | 5 | – | 13 | .278 | 8 | – | 22 | .267 |
| Arkansas–Pine Bluff | 3 | – | 15 | .167 | 4 | – | 26 | .133 |
| Mississippi Valley State | 3 | – | 15 | .167 | 3 | – | 27 | .100 |
Note: The 2020 SWAC tournament was canceled prior to the semifinals due to the COVID-19 pandemic.

The 2019–20 Texas Southern Tigers basketball team represented Texas Southern University during the 2019–20 NCAA Division I men's basketball season. The Tigers, led by second-year head coach Johnny Jones, played their home games at the Health and Physical Education Arena in Houston, Texas as members of the Southwestern Athletic Conference. They finished the season 16–16, 12–6 in SWAC play to finish in third place. They defeated Grambling State in the quarterfinals of the SWAC tournament. They were set to face Southern in the semifinals until the remainder of the tournament was cancelled amid the COVID-19 pandemic.

== Previous season ==
The Tigers finished the 2018–19 season 24–14 overall, 14–4 in SWAC play, to finish in three-way tie for 3rd place. In the SWAC tournament, they defeated Southern in the quarterfinals, Alabama State in the semifinals., advancing to the championship game, where they lost to Prairie View A&M. They were invited to the CIT, where they defeated New Orleans in the first round, Texas–Rio Grande Valley in the second round, Louisiana–Monroe in the quarterfinals, before falling to Green Bay in the semifinals.

== Roster ==
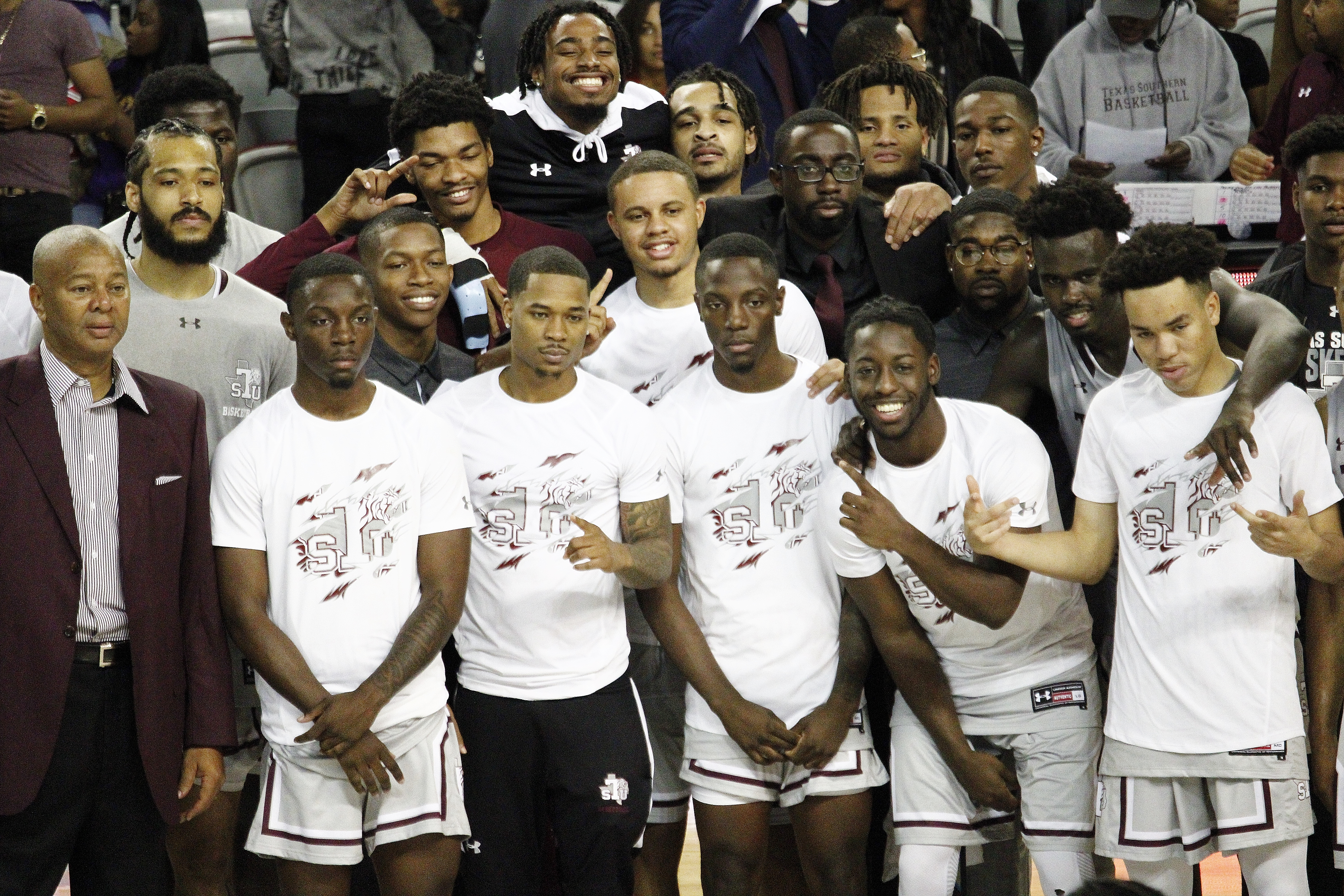
The Texas Southern Tigers in 2020

2019–20 Texas Southern Tigers men's basketball team
Players
Coaches

| Pos. | # | Name | Height | Weight | Year | Hometown |
|---|---|---|---|---|---|---|
| F | 0 | Yahuza Rasas | 6 ft 7 in (2.01 m) | 180 lb (82 kg) | Jr | St. Louis, Missouri |
| G | 2 | Ja'Mare Redus | 6 ft 0 in (1.83 m) | 170 lb (77 kg) | Fr | Houston, Texas |
| F | 3 | Eden Ewing | 6 ft 8 in (2.03 m) | 225 lb (102 kg) | Sr | Richmond, Texas |
| G | 4 | Bryson Etienne | 6 ft 3 in (1.91 m) | 190 lb (86 kg) | Jr | Houston, Texas |
| G | 11 | Ja'Mere Redus | 6 ft 0 in (1.83 m) | 170 lb (77 kg) | Fr | Houston, Texas |
| G | 12 | John Jones | 6 ft 0 in (1.83 m) | 165 lb (75 kg) | Jr | Baton Rouge, Louisiana |
| F | 14 | Chris Baldwin | 6 ft 9 in (2.06 m) | 220 lb (100 kg) | Sr | Springfield, Massachusetts |
| F | 15 | Justin Hopkins | 6 ft 5 in (1.96 m) | 205 lb (93 kg) | RS Jr | Huntsville, Alabama |
| G | 20 | Tyrik Armstrong | 5 ft 10 in (1.78 m) | 170 lb (77 kg) | Sr | Houston, Texas |
| G | 23 | Ashton McClelland | 6 ft 1 in (1.85 m) | 155 lb (70 kg) | So | Houston, Texas |
| F | 24 | John Walker III | 6 ft 9 in (2.06 m) | 200 lb (91 kg) | RS So | Houston, Texas |
| G | 25 | Jordan Andrews | 6 ft 5 in (1.96 m) | 180 lb (82 kg) | Sr | LaPlace, Louisiana |
| F | 30 | Kevin Granger Jr. | 6 ft 5 in (1.96 m) | 194 lb (88 kg) | RS Jr | Houston, Texas |
| G | 32 | Divonte Lumpkin | 6 ft 1 in (1.85 m) | 175 lb (79 kg) | RS Sr | Chicago, Illinois |
| G | 33 | Quinton Brigham | 6 ft 5 in (1.96 m) | 215 lb (98 kg) | Jr | Fort Worth, Texas |
| F | 42 | Jethro Tshisumpa | 6 ft 10 in (2.08 m) | 260 lb (118 kg) | RS Jr | Lubumbashi, Congo |
| F | 44 | Michael Dobbins | 6 ft 6 in (1.98 m) | 275 lb (125 kg) | So | Compton, California |

Head coach

- Johnny Jones (LSU)

Assistant coach(es)

- Randy Peele
- Shyrone Chatman
- JD Williams
- Brandon Chambers

Legend

- (C) Team captain
- (S) Suspended
- (I) Ineligible
- (W) Walk-on
- Injured
- Current redshirt

Roster
Last update: November 25, 2020

== Schedule and results ==
| Date time, TV | Rank^{#} | Opponent^{#} | Result | Record | Site (attendance) city, state |
Non-conference regular season
| November 5, 2019*; 9:00 pm | | at San Diego State | L 42–77 | 0–1 | Viejas Arena (10,093); San Diego, CA |
| November 9, 2019*; 2:00 pm, Cox YurView | | at Wichita State | L 63–69 | 0–2 | Charles Koch Arena (10,108); Wichita, KS |
| November 15, 2019*; 7:00 pm | | at South Dakota; Collegiate Hoops Roadshow | L 69–88 | 0–3 | Sanford Coyote Sports Center (2,096); Vermillion, SD |
| November 19, 2019*; 7:00 pm, SECN+ | | at Arkansas; Collegiate Hoops Roadshow | L 51–82 | 0–4 | Bud Walton Arena (11,182); Fayetteville, AR |
| November 23, 2019*; 8:00 pm, ESPN3 | | at Northern Kentucky; Collegiate Hoops Roadshow | W 98–96 ^{OT} | 1–4 | BB&T Arena (3,118); Highland Heights, KY |
| November 25, 2019*; 8:00 pm, Pluto TV | | at Montana; Collegiate Hoops Roadshow | L 62–74 | 1–5 | Dahlberg Arena (2,981); Missoula, MT |
| November 30, 2019*; 7:00 pm | | Lamar | W 76–73 | 2–5 | H&PE Arena (1,949); Houston, TX |
| December 4, 2019*; 8:00 pm, RTNW | | at No. 9 Gonzaga | L 62–101 | 2–6 | McCarthey Athletic Center (6,000); Spokane, WA |
| December 7, 2019*; 3:00 pm | | Concordia (TX) | W 85–47 | 3–6 | H&PE Arena (1,474); Houston, TX |
| December 18, 2019*; 9:00 pm | | at Nevada | L 73–91 | 3–7 | Lawlor Events Center (8,131); Reno, NV |
| December 21, 2019*; 9:30 pm, P12N | | at No. 8 Oregon | L 78–84 | 3–8 | Matthew Knight Arena (6,764); Eugene, OR |
| December 28, 2019*; 2:00 pm, P12N | | at Arizona State | L 81–98 | 3–9 | Desert Financial Arena (8,795); Tempe, AZ |
| December 30, 2019*; 7:00 pm, SECN+ | | at Texas A&M | L 55–58 | 3–10 | Reed Arena (6,588); College Station, TX |
SWAC regular season
| January 4, 2020; 7:30 pm | | Southern | W 77–68 | 4–10 (1–0) | H&PE Arena (1,711); Houston, TX |
| January 6, 2020; 7:30 pm | | Alcorn State | L 80–95 | 4–11 (1–1) | H&PE Arena (972); Houston, TX |
| January 11, 2020; 7:30 pm | | Prairie View A&M | W 71–67 | 5–11 (2–1) | H&PE Arena (5,107); Houston, TX |
| January 18, 2020; 5:00 pm | | at Jackson State | W 77–66 | 6–11 (3–1) | Williams Assembly Center (604); Jackson, MS |
| January 20, 2020; 7:30 pm | | at Grambling State | W 68–61 | 7–11 (4–1) | Fredrick C. Hobdy Assembly Center (2,386); Grambling, LA |
| January 25, 2020; 7:30 pm | | Mississippi Valley State | W 80–67 | 8–11 (5–1) | H&PE Arena (1,712); Houston, TX |
| January 27, 2020; 7:30 pm | | Arkansas–Pine Bluff | W 68–57 | 9–11 (6–1) | H&PE Arena (1,076); Houston, TX |
| February 1, 2020; 6:00 pm | | at Alabama A&M | W 82–73 | 10–11 (7–1) | Elmore Gymnasium (1,068); Normal, AL |
| February 3, 2020; 7:30 pm | | at Alabama State | L 55–79 | 10–12 (7–2) | Dunn–Oliver Acadome (2,019); Montgomery, AL |
| February 8, 2020; 5:30 pm | | at Prairie View A&M | L 59–69 | 10–13 (7–3) | William Nicks Building (7,843); Prairie View, TX |
| February 15, 2020; 7:30 pm | | Jackson State | W 77–74 | 11–13 (8–3) | H&PE Arena (1,774); Houston, TX |
| February 17, 2020; 7:30 pm | | Grambling State | W 93–79 | 12–13 (9–3) | H&PE Arena (1,884); Houston, TX |
| February 22, 2020; 4:00 pm | | at Mississippi Valley State | W 94–92 | 13–13 (10–3) | Harrison HPER Complex (987); Itta Bena, MS |
| February 24, 2020; 7:30 pm | | at Arkansas–Pine Bluff | L 72–74 ^{OT} | 13–14 (10–4) | K. L. Johnson Complex (1,376); Pine Bluff, AR |
| February 29, 2020; 7:30 pm | | Alabama A&M | W 85–58 | 14–14 (11–4) | H&PE Arena (979); Houston, TX |
| March 2, 2020; 7:30 pm, ESPNU | | Alabama State | W 78–73 | 15–14 (12–4) | H&PE Arena (1,019); Houston, TX |
| March 5, 2020; 7:30 pm | | at Southern | L 74–89 | 15–15 (12–5) | F. G. Clark Center (4,672); Baton Rouge, LA |
| March 7, 2020; 5:30 pm | | at Alcorn State | L 75–90 | 15–16 (12–6) | Davey Whitney Complex (265); Lorman, MS |
SWAC tournament
| March 10, 2020; 8:00 pm, ESPN3 | (3) | (6) Grambling State; Quarterfinals | W 75–62 | 16–16 | H&PE Arena (1,544); Houston, TX |
| March 13, 2020; 8:30 pm, ESPN3 | (3) | vs. (2) Southern; Semifinals | Cancelled due to the COVID-19 pandemic | | Bartow Arena; Birmingham, AL |
*Non-conference game. ^{#}Rankings from AP Poll. (#) Tournament seedings in parentheses. All times are in Central.
