= 2019–20 Alcorn State Braves basketball team =

American college basketball season

2019–20 Alcorn State Braves basketball
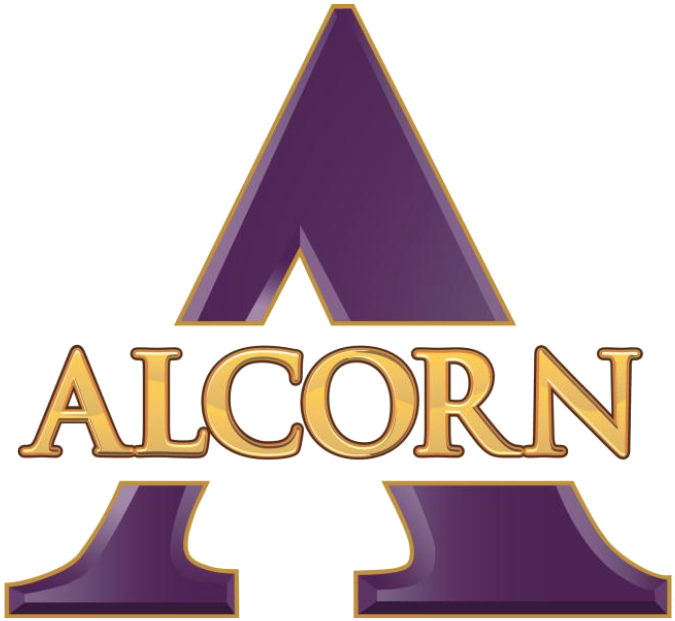
- Conference: Southwestern Athletic Conference
- Record: 15–15 (11–7 SWAC)
- Head coach: Montez Robinson (5th season)
- Assistant coaches: Derek Thompson; Evans Davis; Tamarcio Wilson
- Home arena: Davey Whitney Complex

2019–20 SWAC men's basketball standings
| | Conf. | | | | Overall |
| Team | W | | L | PCT | W | | L | PCT |
|---|---|---|---|---|---|---|---|---|
| Prairie View A&M | 14 | – | 4 | .778 | 19 | – | 13 | .594 |
| Southern | 13 | – | 5 | .722 | 17 | – | 15 | .531 |
| Texas Southern | 12 | – | 6 | .667 | 16 | – | 16 | .500 |
| Grambling State | 11 | – | 7 | .611 | 17 | – | 15 | .531 |
| Jackson State | 11 | – | 7 | .611 | 15 | – | 17 | .469 |
| Alcorn State | 11 | – | 7 | .611 | 15 | – | 15 | .500 |
| Alabama State | 7 | – | 11 | .389 | 8 | – | 24 | .250 |
| Alabama A&M | 5 | – | 13 | .278 | 8 | – | 22 | .267 |
| Arkansas–Pine Bluff | 3 | – | 15 | .167 | 4 | – | 26 | .133 |
| Mississippi Valley State | 3 | – | 15 | .167 | 3 | – | 27 | .100 |
Note: The 2020 SWAC tournament was canceled prior to the semifinals due to the COVID-19 pandemic.

The 2019–20 Alcorn State Braves basketball team represented Alcorn State University in the 2019–20 NCAA Division I men's basketball season. The Braves, led by fifth-year head coach Montez Robinson, played their home games at the Davey Whitney Complex in Lorman, Mississippi as members of the Southwestern Athletic Conference (SWAC). They finished the season 15–15, 11–7 in SWAC play to finish in a three-way tie for fourth place. The Braves lost in the first round of the SWAC tournament to Jackson State.

== Previous season ==
The Braves finished the 2018–19 season 10–21 overall, 6–12 in SWAC play, to finish in a tie for 7th place. In the SWAC tournament, they were defeated by Prairie View A&M in the quarterfinals.

== Roster ==
2019–20 Alcorn State Braves men's basketball team
Players
Coaches

| Pos. | # | Name | Height | Weight | Year | Hometown |
|---|---|---|---|---|---|---|
| G | 0 | Troymain Crosby | 6 ft 4 in (1.93 m) | 200 lb (91 kg) | Jr | Laurel, MS |
| G | 1 | Isaiah Attles | 6 ft 2 in (1.88 m) | 170 lb (77 kg) | Jr | Oakland, CA |
| G | 2 | Jael Scott | 6 ft 4 in (1.93 m) | 195 lb (88 kg) | Jr | Charlotte, NC |
| G | 3 | Corey Tillery | 6 ft 3 in (1.91 m) | 180 lb (82 kg) | Sr | Atlanta, GA |
| F | 4 | Anthony Fairley | 6 ft 8 in (2.03 m) | 190 lb (86 kg) | Jr | Mobile, AL |
| G | 5 | Dekedran Thorn | 6 ft 4 in (1.93 m) | 165 lb (75 kg) | Fr | Houston, TX |
| F | 10 | Kobe Wilson | 6 ft 9 in (2.06 m) | 220 lb (100 kg) | Jr | Kennesaw, GA |
| G | 11 | Maurice Howard | 6 ft 1 in (1.85 m) | 190 lb (86 kg) | Sr | Quincy, FL |
| F | 12 | Deshaw Andrews | 6 ft 4 in (1.93 m) | 240 lb (109 kg) | Sr | York, SC |
| F | 13 | Mathias Nchekwube | 6 ft 8 in (2.03 m) | 190 lb (86 kg) | So | Oakridge, OR |
| G | 15 | Devin Wade-Henderson | 6 ft 4 in (1.93 m) | 190 lb (86 kg) | Fr | Minneapolis, MN |
| F | 21 | Mark Carter | 6 ft 6 in (1.98 m) | 195 lb (88 kg) | Jr | Los Angeles, CA |
| G | 23 | Dominic Brewton | 6 ft 3 in (1.91 m) | 185 lb (84 kg) | Fr | Cincinnati, OH |
| G | 24 | Arne Morris | 6 ft 3 in (1.91 m) | 190 lb (86 kg) | Jr | Raleigh, NC |
| G/F | 30 | Edrick Alsworth | 6 ft 3 in (1.91 m) | 215 lb (98 kg) | Sr | Brookhaven, MS |
| F | 33 | Devon Brewer | 6 ft 8 in (2.03 m) | 260 lb (118 kg) | Sr | Hiram, GA |
| C | 42 | Alonzo Campbell | 7 ft 0 in (2.13 m) | 235 lb (107 kg) | Sr | Portland, OR |

Head coach

- Montez Robinson (North Georgia)

Assistant coach(es)

- Derek Thompson (Morris Brown)
- Evans Davis (Mercer)
- Tamarcio Wilson (Alcorn State)

Legend

- (C) Team captain
- (S) Suspended
- (I) Ineligible
- (W) Walk-on
- Injured
- Current redshirt

Roster
Last update: June 1, 2025

== Schedule and results ==
| Date time, TV | Rank^{#} | Opponent^{#} | Result | Record | Site (attendance) city, state |
Non-conference regular season
| November 5, 2019*; 8:00 p.m., FS2 | | at DePaul | L 54–72 | 0–1 | Wintrust Arena (3,483); Chicago, IL |
| November 9, 2019*; 11:00 a.m. | | at Louisiana–Monroe | L 72–73 ^{OT} | 0–2 | Fant–Ewing Coliseum (1,472); Monroe, LA |
| November 12, 2019*; 6:00 p.m. | | Paul Quinn | W 111–59 | 1–2 | Davey Whitney Complex (232); Lorman, MS |
| November 16, 2019*; 1:00 p.m., ESPN3 | | at No. 13 Memphis | L 56–102 | 1–3 | FedExForum (15,471); Memphis, TN |
| November 19, 2019*; 6:00 p.m., ESPN3 | | at NC State | L 64–87 | 1–4 | PNC Arena (4,624); Raleigh, NC |
| November 21, 2019*; 5:30 p.m. | | Our Lady of the Lake | W 92–56 | 2–4 | Davey Whitney Complex (126); Lorman, MS |
| November 27, 2019*; 6:30 p.m. | | at Little Rock | L 50–67 | 2–5 | Jack Stephens Center (807); Little Rock, AR |
| December 9, 2019*; 6:00 p.m. | | Rust | W 108–62 | 3–5 | Davey Whitney Complex (103); Lorman, MS |
| December 16, 2019*; 7:00 p.m., ESPN3 | | at Tulane | L 57–68 | 3–6 | Devlin Fieldhouse (883); New Orleans, LA |
| December 20, 2019*; 5:30 p.m. | | Ecclesia | W 122–71 | 4–6 | Davey Whitney Complex (101); Lorman, MS |
| December 29, 2019*; 4:00 p.m. | | at Santa Clara | L 57–92 | 4–7 | Leavey Center (1,242); Santa Clara, CA |
SWAC regular season
| January 4, 2020; 5:30 p.m. | | at Prairie View A&M | L 70–84 | 4–8 (0–1) | William Nicks Building (176); Prairie View, TX |
| January 6, 2020; 7:30 p.m. | | at Texas Southern | W 95–80 | 5–8 (1–1) | H&PE Arena (972); Houston, TX |
| January 11, 2020; 5:30 p.m. | | Jackson State | L 65–76 | 5–9 (1–2) | Davey Whitney Complex (668); Lorman, MS |
| January 13, 2020; 7:30 p.m. | | Grambling State | W 87–69 | 6–9 (2–2) | Davey Whitney Complex (277); Lorman, MS |
| January 18, 2020; 4:00 p.m. | | at Mississippi Valley State | W 105–73 | 7–9 (3–2) | Harrison HPER Complex (3,249); Itta Bena, MS |
| January 20, 2020; 7:30 p.m. | | at Arkansas–Pine Bluff | W 82–54 | 8–9 (4–2) | K. L. Johnson Complex (2,246); Pine Bluff, AR |
| January 25, 2020; 5:30 p.m. | | Alabama A&M | W 59–58 | 9–9 (5–2) | Davey Whitney Complex (388); Lorman, MS |
| January 27, 2020; 7:30 p.m. | | Alabama State | W 63–60 | 10–9 (6–2) | Davey Whitney Complex (374); Lorman, MS |
| February 1, 2020; 5:30 p.m. | | at Southern | L 82–93 | 10–10 (6–3) | F. G. Clark Center (4,286); Baton Rouge, LA |
| February 8, 2020; 5:30 p.m. | | at Jackson State | L 57–86 | 10–11 (6–4) | Williams Assembly Center (1,012); Jackson, MS |
| February 10, 2020; 7:30 p.m. | | at Grambling State | L 71–80 | 10–12 (6–5) | Fredrick C. Hobdy Assembly Center (910); Grambling, LA |
| February 15, 2020; 5:30 p.m. | | Mississippi Valley State | W 92–88 ^{OT} | 11–12 (7–5) | Davey Whitney Complex (315); Lorman, MS |
| February 17, 2020; 7:30 p.m. | | Arkansas–Pine Bluff | W 60–52 | 12–12 (8–5) | Davey Whitney Complex (359); Lorman, MS |
| February 22, 2020; 5:30 p.m. | | at Alabama A&M | L 61–71 | 12–13 (8–6) | Elmore Gymnasium (1,155); Normal, AL |
| February 24, 2020; 7:30 p.m. | | at Alabama State | W 80–77 | 13–13 (9–6) | Dunn–Oliver Acadome (1,010); Montgomery, AL |
| February 29, 2020; 5:30 p.m. | | Southern | L 57–71 | 13–14 (9–7) | Davey Whitney Complex (453); Lorman, MS |
| March 5, 2020; 7:30 p.m. | | Prairie View A&M | W 80–71 | 14–14 (10–7) | Davey Whitney Complex (395); Lorman, MS |
| March 7, 2020; 5:30 p.m. | | Texas Southern | W 90–75 | 15–14 (11–7) | Davey Whitney Complex (265); Lorman, MS |
SWAC tournament
| March 10, 2020; 8:00 p.m., ESPN3 | (5) | at No. 4 Jackson State; Quarterfinals | L 52–69 | 15–15 | Williams Assembly Center (1,576); Jackson, MS |
*Non-conference game. ^{#}Rankings from AP poll. (#) Tournament seedings in parentheses. All times are in Central.
