= 2019–20 Alabama State Hornets basketball team =

American college basketball season

2019–20 Alabama State Hornets basketball
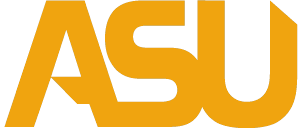
- Conference: Southwestern Athletic Conference
- Record: 8–24 (7–11 SWAC)
- Head coach: Lewis Jackson (15th season)
- Assistant coaches: Anthony Sewell; Steve Rogers; Kevin Missouri
- Home arena: Dunn–Oliver Acadome

2019–20 SWAC men's basketball standings
	Conf.				Overall
Team	W		L	PCT	W		L	PCT
Prairie View A&M	14	–	4	.778	19	–	13	.594
Southern	13	–	5	.722	17	–	15	.531
Texas Southern	12	–	6	.667	16	–	16	.500
Grambling State	11	–	7	.611	17	–	15	.531
Jackson State	11	–	7	.611	15	–	17	.469
Alcorn State	11	–	7	.611	15	–	15	.500
Alabama State	7	–	11	.389	8	–	24	.250
Alabama A&M	5	–	13	.278	8	–	22	.267
Arkansas–Pine Bluff	3	–	15	.167	4	–	26	.133
Mississippi Valley State	3	–	15	.167	3	–	27	.100
Note: The 2020 SWAC tournament was canceled prior to the semifinals due to the COVID-19 pandemic.

The 2019–20 Alabama State Hornets basketball team represented Alabama State University in the 2019–20 NCAA Division I men's basketball season. The Hornets, led by 15th-year head coach Lewis Jackson, played their home games at the Dunn–Oliver Acadome in Montgomery, Alabama as members of the Southwestern Athletic Conference. They finished the season with a record of 8–24 overall and 7–11 in SWAC play to finish in seventh place. They lost in the first round of the SWAC tournament to Southern.

== Previous season ==
The Hornets finished the 2018–19 season 12–19 overall, 9–9 in SWAC play, to finish in 6th place. In the SWAC tournament, they upset Jackson State in the quarterfinals, before losing to Texas Southern in the semifinals.

== Roster ==
2019–20 Alabama State Hornets men's basketball team
Players
Coaches

Pos.	#	Name	Height	Weight	Year	Hometown
G	0	DJ Heath	6 ft 0 in (1.83 m)	185 lb (84 kg)	Jr	Anniston, Alabama
G/F	1	Leon Daniels	6 ft 5 in (1.96 m)	195 lb (88 kg)	Sr	Atlantic City, New Jersey
G	2	Kevin Holston	6 ft 1 in (1.85 m)	195 lb (88 kg)	RS Jr	Washington, D.C.
G/F	3	Tyrece Cheek	6 ft 4 in (1.93 m)	170 lb (77 kg)	So	Greensboro, North Carolina
G/F	4	Jeremy Hamilton	6 ft 3 in (1.91 m)	200 lb (91 kg)	Jr	Los Angeles, California
G	5	Tobi Ewuosho	6 ft 5 in (1.96 m)	200 lb (91 kg)	Sr	Chicago, Illinois
G	10	Jacoby Ross	5 ft 9 in (1.75 m)	180 lb (82 kg)	Jr	New Orleans, Louisiana
G/F	11	Austin Rogers	6 ft 4 in (1.93 m)	195 lb (88 kg)	RS Jr	Montgomery, Alabama
G	12	Decardo Day	6 ft 5 in (1.96 m)	180 lb (82 kg)	GS	Jackson, Mississippi
G/F	13	AJ Farrar	6 ft 5 in (1.96 m)	205 lb (93 kg)	Sr	Duluth, Georgia
F	14	Brandon Battle	6 ft 8 in (2.03 m)	215 lb (98 kg)	Jr	Warren, Ohio
G/F	15	Lemone Lampley II	6 ft 5 in (1.96 m)	175 lb (79 kg)	Fr	Frankfort, Illinois
G	20	John Sellars	6 ft 2 in (1.88 m)	185 lb (84 kg)	RS Fr	Fort Lauderdale, Florida
F	21	Mike Stone	6 ft 9 in (2.06 m)	260 lb (118 kg)	Jr	Brooklyn, New York
G	22	Malik Smiley	6 ft 4 in (1.93 m)	180 lb (82 kg)	Fr	Birmingham, Alabama
G	24	Kevion Stewart	6 ft 3 in (1.91 m)	190 lb (86 kg)	RS Jr	Memphis, Tennessee
G	30	Christopher Dumas	6 ft 0 in (1.83 m)	175 lb (79 kg)	Fr	Atlanta, Georgia
F	35	Tyrese Robinson	6 ft 8 in (2.03 m)	200 lb (91 kg)	Jr	Wilkinsburg, Pennsylvania

Head coach

- Lewis Jackson (Alabama State)

Assistant coach(es)

- Anthony Sewell (Troy)
- Steve Rogers (Alabama State)
- Kevin Missouri (Texas Southern)

Legend

- (C) Team captain
- (S) Suspended
- (I) Ineligible
- (W) Walk-on
- Injured
- Current redshirt

Roster
Last update: December 12, 2019

== Schedule and results ==
Date time, TV	Rank^{#}	Opponent^{#}	Result	Record	Site (attendance) city, state
Non-conference regular season
November 5, 2019*; 7:00 pm		at No. 8 Gonzaga	L 64–95	0–1	McCarthey Athletic Center (6,000); Spokane, WA
November 10, 2019*; 2:00 pm, ESPN+		at Missouri State	L 50–59	0–2	JQH Arena (3,639); Springfield, MO
November 12, 2019*; 7:00 pm, ESPNU		at Houston	L 56–84	0–3	Fertitta Center (6,430); Houston, TX
November 20, 2019*; 6:00 pm, SECN+		at No. 20 Tennessee; Emerald Coast Classic campus-site game	L 41–76	0–4	Thompson–Boling Arena (18,176); Knoxville, TN
November 25, 2019*; 6:00 pm, ESPN+		at No. 20 VCU; Emerald Coast Classic campus-site game	L 62–78	0–5	Siegel Center (7,637); Richmond, VA
November 29, 2019*; 1:30 pm		vs. Chattanooga; Emerald Coast Classic semifinals	L 56–74	0–6	The Arena at NWSFC; Niceville, FL
November 30, 2019*; 10:00 am		vs. Chicago State; Emerald Coast Classic consolation round	W 67–54	1–6	The Arena at NWSFC (110); Niceville, FL
December 9, 2019*; 7:00 pm		at South Dakota	L 59–73	1–7	Sanford Coyote Sports Center (1,601); Vermillion, SD
December 11, 2019*; 7:00 pm, ESPN+		at Kansas State	L 41–86	1–8	Bramlage Coliseum (7,577); Manhattan, KS
December 14, 2019*; 5:00 pm		at Boise State	L 57–100	1–9	ExtraMile Arena (3,478); Boise, ID
December 21, 2019*; 4:00 pm		vs. UAB; St. Pete's Shootout	L 63–71	1–10	McArthur Center (176); St. Petersburg, FL
December 22, 2019*; 11:00 am		vs. Austin Peay; St. Pete's Shootout	L 69–80	1–11	McArthur Center (181); St. Petersburg, FL
December 29, 2019*; 3:00 pm, P12N		at No. 6 Oregon	L 59–98	1–12	Matthew Knight Arena (6,771); Eugene, OR
SWAC regular season
January 4, 2020; 5:00 pm		at Jackson State	L 67–70	1–13 (0–1)	Williams Assembly Center (237); Jackson, MS
January 6, 2020; 7:30 pm		at Grambling State	L 63–68	1–14 (0–2)	Fredrick C. Hobdy Assembly Center (750); Grambling, LA
January 11, 2020; 5:00 pm		Mississippi Valley State	W 81–75	2–14 (1–2)	Dunn–Oliver Acadome (1,360); Montgomery, AL
January 13, 2020; 7:30 pm		Arkansas–Pine Bluff	L 56–61	2–15 (1–3)	Dunn–Oliver Acadome (1,893); Montgomery, AL
January 18, 2020; 5:00 pm		vs. Alabama A&M	W 65–56	3–15 (2–3)	Bill Harris Arena (3,126); Birmingham, AL
January 25, 2020; 5:30 pm		at Southern	L 71–80	3–16 (2–4)	F. G. Clark Center (3,783); Baton Rouge, LA
January 27, 2020; 7:30 pm		at Alcorn State	L 60–63	3–17 (2–5)	Davey Whitney Complex (374); Lorman, MS
February 1, 2020; 5:00 pm		Prairie View A&M	W 52–49	4–17 (3–5)	Dunn–Oliver Acadome (1,012); Montgomery, AL
February 3, 2020; 7:30 pm		Texas Southern	W 79–55	5–17 (4–5)	Dunn–Oliver Acadome (2,019); Montgomery, AL
February 8, 2020; 5:00 pm		at Mississippi Valley State	W 87–74	6–17 (5–5)	Harrison HPER Complex (990); Itta Bena, MS
February 10, 2020; 7:30 pm		at Arkansas–Pine Bluff	W 57–49	7–17 (6–5)	K. L. Johnson Complex; Pine Bluff, AR
February 15, 2020; 5:00 pm		Alabama A&M	W 61–58	8–17 (7–5)	Dunn–Oliver Acadome (3,318); Montgomery, AL
February 22, 2020; 5:00 pm		Southern	L 44–56	8–18 (7–6)	Dunn–Oliver Acadome (1,290); Montgomery, AL
February 24, 2020; 7:30 pm		Alcorn State	L 77–80	8–19 (7–7)	Dunn–Oliver Acadome (1,010); Montgomery, AL
February 29, 2020; 5:00 pm		at Prairie View A&M	L 58–65	8–20 (7–8)	William Nicks Building (1,059); Prairie View, TX
March 2, 2020; 8:00 pm, ESPNU		at Texas Southern	L 73–78	8–21 (7–9)	H&PE Arena (1,019); Houston, TX
March 5, 2020; 7:30 pm		Jackson State	L 59–71	8–22 (7–10)	Dunn–Oliver Acadome (1,289); Montgomery, AL
March 7, 2020; 5:00 pm		Grambling State	L 58–70	8–23 (7–11)	Dunn–Oliver Acadome (2,091); Montgomery, AL
SWAC tournament
March 10, 2020; 7:30 pm, ESPN3	(7)	at (2) Southern; Quarterfinals	L 53–67	8–24	F. G. Clark Center (4,758); Baton Rouge, LA
*Non-conference game. ^{#}Rankings from AP Poll. (#) Tournament seedings in parentheses. All times are in Central.
