= 2019–20 Jackson State Tigers basketball team =

American college basketball season

2019–20 Jackson State Tigers basketball
- Conference: Southwestern Athletic Conference
- Record: 15–17 (11–7 SWAC)
- Head coach: Wayne Brent (7th season)
- Assistant coaches: Cason Burk; De'Suan Dixon; Christopher Woodall
- Home arena: Williams Assembly Center

2019–20 SWAC men's basketball standings
	Conf.				Overall
Team	W		L	PCT	W		L	PCT
Prairie View A&M	14	–	4	.778	19	–	13	.594
Southern	13	–	5	.722	17	–	15	.531
Texas Southern	12	–	6	.667	16	–	16	.500
Grambling State	11	–	7	.611	17	–	15	.531
Jackson State	11	–	7	.611	15	–	17	.469
Alcorn State	11	–	7	.611	15	–	15	.500
Alabama State	7	–	11	.389	8	–	24	.250
Alabama A&M	5	–	13	.278	8	–	22	.267
Arkansas–Pine Bluff	3	–	15	.167	4	–	26	.133
Mississippi Valley State	3	–	15	.167	3	–	27	.100
Note: The 2020 SWAC tournament was canceled prior to the semifinals due to the COVID-19 pandemic.

The 2019–20 Jackson State Tigers basketball team represented Jackson State University during the 2019–20 NCAA Division I men's basketball season. The Tigers were led by seventh-year head coach Wayne Brent, and played their home games at the Williams Assembly Center in Jackson, Mississippi as members of the Southwestern Athletic Conference. They finished the season 15–17, 11–7 in SWAC play to finish in a three-way tie for fourth place. They defeated Alcorn State in the quarterfinals of the SWAC tournament and were set to face Prairie View A&M in the semifinals until the tournament was cancelled amid the COVID-19 pandemic.

== Previous season ==
The Tigers finished the season 13–19 overall, 10–8 in SWAC play to finish in a three-way tie for third place. As the No. 3 seed in the SWAC tournament, they were upset by No. 6 seed Alabama State in the quarterfinals.

== Roster ==
2019–20 Jackson State Tigers men's basketball team
Players
Coaches

Pos.	#	Name	Height	Weight	Year	Hometown
G	0	Venji Wallis	6 ft 6 in (1.98 m)	185 lb (84 kg)	Sr	Houma, LA
G/F	1	Roland Griffin	6 ft 6 in (1.98 m)	215 lb (98 kg)	Sr	Aurora, IL
G	3	Jonas James	6 ft 0 in (1.83 m)	160 lb (73 kg)	Jr	Jackson, MS
G	4	Tristan Jarrett	6 ft 4 in (1.93 m)	195 lb (88 kg)	Jr	Brownsville, TN
G	5	Dontelius Ross	5 ft 9 in (1.75 m)	175 lb (79 kg)	Sr	Jackson, MS
G	10	Cainan McClelland	6 ft 4 in (1.93 m)	175 lb (79 kg)	Sr	Houston, TX
F/C	11	Jayveous McKinnis	6 ft 7 in (2.01 m)	225 lb (102 kg)	So	Brandon, MS
G	12	Darrian Wilson	6 ft 4 in (1.93 m)	200 lb (91 kg)	Jr	Brookhaven, MS
G	13	Miles Daniels	6 ft 3 in (1.91 m)	185 lb (84 kg)	Jr	Gulfport, MS
G	14	Kenneth Lewis	6 ft 1 in (1.85 m)	165 lb (75 kg)	Fr	Olive Branch, MS
G	20	Geronimo Warner	6 ft 2 in (1.88 m)	185 lb (84 kg)	Fr	Mesa, AZ
G	21	Lemmie Howard	6 ft 7 in (2.01 m)	205 lb (93 kg)	Jr	Belzoni, MS
G	22	Ken Evans Jr.	6 ft 4 in (1.93 m)	195 lb (88 kg)	Fr	Jackson, MS
F	23	Kelvin Wesley	6 ft 5 in (1.96 m)	200 lb (91 kg)	Fr	Houston, TX
G	24	Kesaiah Parks	6 ft 2 in (1.88 m)	165 lb (75 kg)	Fr	Lincoln, NE
F	30	Khalil Spencer	6 ft 4 in (1.93 m)	235 lb (107 kg)	Sr	Memphis, TN
G	33	Josh Everett	6 ft 1 in (1.85 m)	150 lb (68 kg)	Jr	Duck Hill, MS
G	35	Thomas "Snacks" Lee	6 ft 0 in (1.83 m)	—	Sr	Jackson, MS
G	50	Hunter Shelton	6 ft 6 in (1.98 m)	190 lb (86 kg)	Jr	Owensboro, KY

Head coach

- Wayne Brent (Louisiana–Monroe)

Assistant coach(es)

- Cason Burk (Jackson State)
- De'Suan Dixon (Jackson State)
- Christopher Woodall (William Carey)

Legend

- (C) Team captain
- (S) Suspended
- (I) Ineligible
- (W) Walk-on
- Injured
- Current redshirt

Roster
Last update: April 15, 2020

== Schedule and results ==
Date time, TV	Rank^{#}	Opponent^{#}	Result	Record	Site (attendance) city, state
Non-conference regular season
November 5, 2019*; 7:00 pm		at California Baptist	L 70–93	0–1	CBU Events Center (4,976); Riverside, CA
November 6, 2019*; 7:00 pm		at UC Santa Barbara	L 62–83	0–2	UC Santa Barbara Events Center (1,517); Santa Barbara, CA
November 12, 2019*; 7:00 pm		at Tulane	L 79–88	0–3	Devlin Fieldhouse (1,225); New Orleans, LA
November 16, 2019*; 7:00 pm		at SMU	L 63–80	0–4	Moody Coliseum (3,889); University Park, TX
November 18, 2019*; 7:00 pm, ESPN+		at Texas State	L 58–73	0–5	Strahan Arena (1,645); San Marcos, TX
November 22, 2019*; 7:00 pm		Southern–New Orleans	W 72–53	1–5	Williams Assembly Center (515); Jackson, MS
November 26, 2019*; 7:00 pm		at UNLV	L 57–80	1–6	Thomas & Mack Center (7,164); Paradise, NV
December 1, 2019*; 1:00 pm		at Air Force	L 52–76	1–7	Clune Arena (1,438); Colorado Springs, CO
December 3, 2019*; 7:00 pm		at Denver	L 58–67	1–8	Magness Arena (497); Denver, CO
December 16, 2019*; 7:00 pm		Southeastern Baptist	W 113–67	2–8	Williams Assembly Center (121); Jackson, MS
December 19, 2019*; 7:00 pm		at Portland	W 73–63	3–8	Chiles Center (1,068); Portland, OR
December 21, 2019*; 12:00 pm		at No. 11 Memphis	L 49–77	3–9	FedExForum (15,925); Memphis, TN
December 30, 2019*; 2:00 pm, ESPN+		at No. 6 Baylor	L 57–83	3–10	Ferrell Center (6,773); Waco, TX
SWAC regular season
January 4, 2020; 5:00 pm		Alabama State	W 70–67	4–10 (1–0)	Williams Assembly Center (237); Jackson, MS
January 6, 2020; 7:30 pm		Alabama A&M	L 57–66	4–11 (1–1)	Williams Assembly Center (295); Jackson, MS
January 11, 2020; 5:30 pm		at Alcorn State	W 76–65	5–11 (2–1)	Davey Whitney Complex (668); Lorman, MS
January 13, 2020; 7:30 pm		at Southern	L 50–56	5–12 (2–2)	F. G. Clark Center (2,401); Baton Rouge, LA
January 18, 2020; 5:30 pm		Texas Southern	W 77–66	5–13 (2–3)	Williams Assembly Center (604); Jackson, MS
January 20, 2020; 7:30 pm		Prairie View A&M	L 60–74	5–14 (2–4)	Williams Assembly Center (497); Jackson, MS
January 25, 2020; 5:30 pm		Grambling State	W 71–53	6–14 (3–4)	Williams Assembly Center (267); Jackson, MS
February 1, 2020; 4:30 pm		at Mississippi Valley State	W 85–65	7–14 (4–4)	Harrison HPER Complex (4,298); Itta Bena, MS
February 3, 2020; 7:30 pm		at Arkansas–Pine Bluff	W 49–42	8–14 (5–4)	K. L. Johnson Complex (3,269); Pine Bluff, AR
February 8, 2020; 5:30 pm		Alcorn State	W 86–57	9–14 (6–4)	Williams Assembly Center (1,012); Jackson, MS
February 10, 2020; 7:30 pm		Southern	W 67–51	10–14 (7–4)	Williams Assembly Center (1,029); Jackson, MS
February 15, 2020; 5:30 pm		at Texas Southern	L 74–77	10–15 (7–5)	H&PE Arena (1,774); Houston, TX
February 17, 2020; 7:30 pm		at Prairie View A&M	L 61–70	10–16 (7–6)	William J. Nicks Building (1,250); Prairie View, TX
February 22, 2020; 5:30 pm		at Grambling State	L 61–63	10–17 (7–7)	Fredrick C. Hobdy Assembly Center (1,155); Grambling, LA
February 29, 2020; 5:30 pm		Mississippi Valley State	W 87–70	11–17 (8–7)	Williams Assembly Center (1,021); Jackson, MS
March 2, 2020; 7:30 pm		Arkansas–Pine Bluff	W 76–56	12–17 (9–7)	Williams Assembly Center (1,207); Jackson, MS
March 5, 2020; 7:30 pm		at Alabama State	W 71–59	13–17 (10–7)	Dunn–Oliver Acadome (1,289); Montgomery, AL
March 7, 2020; 7:30 pm		at Alabama A&M	W 54–51	14–17 (11–7)	Elmore Gymnasium (1,291); Huntsville, AL
SWAC tournament
March 10, 2020; 7:30 pm, ESPN3	(4)	(5) Alcorn State; Quarterfinals	W 69–52	15–17	Williams Assembly Center (1,576); Jackson, MS
March 13, 2020; 2:30 pm, ESPN3	(4)	vs. (1) Prairie View A&M; Semifinals	Cancelled due to the COVID-19 pandemic		Bartow Arena; Birmingham, AL
*Non-conference game. ^{#}Rankings from AP Poll. (#) Tournament seedings in parentheses. All times are in Central Time.

Schedule source:
