= 2019–20 Mississippi Valley State Delta Devils basketball team =

American college basketball season

2019–20 Mississippi Valley State Delta Devils basketball
- Conference: Southwestern Athletic Conference
- Record: 3–27 (3–15 SWAC)
- Head coach: Lindsey Hunter (1st season)
- Assistant coaches: Alan Perry; Will Vance
- Home arena: Harrison HPER Complex

2019–20 SWAC men's basketball standings
	Conf.				Overall
Team	W		L	PCT	W		L	PCT
Prairie View A&M	14	–	4	.778	19	–	13	.594
Southern	13	–	5	.722	17	–	15	.531
Texas Southern	12	–	6	.667	16	–	16	.500
Grambling State	11	–	7	.611	17	–	15	.531
Jackson State	11	–	7	.611	15	–	17	.469
Alcorn State	11	–	7	.611	15	–	15	.500
Alabama State	7	–	11	.389	8	–	24	.250
Alabama A&M	5	–	13	.278	8	–	22	.267
Arkansas–Pine Bluff	3	–	15	.167	4	–	26	.133
Mississippi Valley State	3	–	15	.167	3	–	27	.100
Note: The 2020 SWAC tournament was canceled prior to the semifinals due to the COVID-19 pandemic.

The 2019–20 Mississippi Valley State Delta Devils basketball team represented Mississippi Valley State University during the 2019–20 NCAA Division I men's basketball season. The Delta Devils were led by first-year head coach Lindsey Hunter and played their home games at the Harrison HPER Complex in Itta Bena, Mississippi as members of the Southwestern Athletic Conference (SWAC). They finished the season 3–27, 3–15 in SWAC play, to finish in a tie for ninth place. They failed to qualify for the SWAC tournament.

== Previous season ==
The Delta Devils finished the 2018–19 season 6–26 overall, 4–14 in SWAC play, to finish in a tie for last place. On March 25, 2019, the school announced that head coach Andre Payne would not return as head coach after five seasons. On April 22, the school announced that former NBA player and coach Lindsey Hunter had been named head coach.

== Regular season ==
On November 8, Utah defeated the Delta Devils 143–49 to set an NCAA record for widest margin of victory (94 points) over a Division I opponent.

Two players recently received "Delta Devil of the Day" awards. The recipients were: Richard "Big Tuna" Rivers, a 6' 11" center from Pennsylvania, and Caleb Hunter, a 5' 11" guard from Michigan.

The game against North American University is a non-countable game.

== Roster ==
2019–20 Mississippi Valley State Delta Devils men's basketball team
Players
Coaches

Pos.	#	Name	Height	Weight	Year	Hometown
F	0	Jordan Lyons	6 ft 7 in (2.01 m)	210 lb (95 kg)	Jr	Toronto, ON
G	1	Mike Green	6 ft 3 in (1.91 m)	190 lb (86 kg)	Sr	Atlanta, GA
G	2	Torico Simmons	5 ft 8 in (1.73 m)	165 lb (75 kg)	Sr	Wilkinson County, GA
G	3	Cay Hunter	5 ft 11 in (1.8 m)	175 lb (79 kg)	Fr	Plymouth, MI
F	5	Richard Jr. Rivers	6 ft 11 in (2.11 m)	280 lb (127 kg)	Fr	North Hills, PA
G	10	Quinton Alston	6 ft 5 in (1.96 m)	205 lb (93 kg)	Fr	Kingstree, SC
G	11	Rich Jones	5 ft 10 in (1.78 m)	165 lb (75 kg)	Fr	Trenton, NJ
G	12	Zach Barnes	6 ft 1 in (1.85 m)	185 lb (84 kg)	Sr	Jackson, MS
F	13	Wiz Kowouto	6 ft 6 in (1.98 m)	250 lb (113 kg)	So	Minneapolis, MN
G	22	Ahmadu Sarnor	6 ft 1 in (1.85 m)	170 lb (77 kg)	Fr	Coatesville, PA
G	23	Agasiy Tonoyan	6 ft 8 in (2.03 m)	220 lb (100 kg)	Fr	Moscow, Russia
F	24	Carnell McGirt	6 ft 6 in (1.98 m)	215 lb (98 kg)	Sr	Philadelphia, PA
F	32	Gebreal Samaha	6 ft 8 in (2.03 m)	230 lb (104 kg)	Fr	Khenchara, Lebanon
F	33	Brandon Kimble	6 ft 7 in (2.01 m)	180 lb (82 kg)	Jr	Indianola, MS
F	35	Dario Milojevic	6 ft 8 in (2.03 m)	235 lb (107 kg)	Fr	Windsor, ON

Head coach

- Lindsey Hunter (Jackson State)

Assistant coach(es)

- Alan Perry
- Will Vance (Sam Houston State)

Legend

- (C) Team captain
- (S) Suspended
- (I) Ineligible
- (W) Walk-on
- Injured
- Current redshirt

Roster
Last update: December 2, 2024

== Schedule and results ==
Date time, TV	Opponent	Result	Record	Site (attendance) city, state
Exhibition
October 30, 2019*; 7:00 p.m.	Tougaloo	W 98–79		Harrison HPER Complex (2,897); Itta Bena, MS
Non-conference regular season
November 5, 2019*; 7:00 p.m.	at Iowa State	L 74–110	0–1	Hilton Coliseum (13,744); Ames, IA
November 8, 2019*; 8:00 p.m., P12N	at Utah	L 49–143	0–2	Jon M. Huntsman Center (9,926); Salt Lake City, UT
November 10, 2019*; 1:00 p.m., ESPN+	at Central Michigan	L 78–134	0–3	McGuirk Arena (1,896); Mount Pleasant, MI
November 12, 2019*; 8:00 p.m., ESPN+	at Western Michigan	L 81–91	0–4	University Arena (1,591); Kalamazoo, MI
November 19, 2019*; 6:30 p.m.	at Louisiana Tech	L 43–76	0–5	Thomas Assembly Center (1,483); Ruston, LA
November 24, 2019*; 7:00 p.m.	at South Dakota State	L 54–84	0–6	Frost Arena (1,569); Brookings, SD
November 27, 2019*; 1:30 p.m.	at North Alabama	L 50–73	0–7	Flowers Hall (387); Florence, AL
November 30, 2019*; 6:00 p.m., YouTube	North American; Exhibition	W 124–70		Harrison HPER Complex (879); Itta Bena, MS
December 6, 2019*; 7:00 p.m., ESPN3	at Missouri State	L 62–86	0–8	JQH Arena (3,552); Springfield, MO
December 15, 2019*; 1:00 p.m., ESPN3	at Miami (OH)	L 67–79	0–9	Millett Hall (981); Oxford, OH
December 17, 2019*; 6:00 p.m., ESPN+	at Wright State	L 50–92	0–10	Nutter Center (2,773); Fairborn, OH
December 20, 2019*; 9:00 p.m.	at Santa Clara	L 71–100	0–11	Leavey Center (875); Santa Clara, CA
December 22, 2019*; 9:00 p.m.	at California Baptist	L 66–103	0–12	CBU Events Center (2,003); Riverside, CA
SWAC regular season
January 4, 2020; 4:00 p.m., YouTube	Arkansas–Pine Bluff	L 76–80	0–13 (0–1)	Harrison HPER Complex (3,089); Itta Bena, MS
January 11, 2020; 8:00 p.m.	at Alabama State	L 75–81	0–14 (0–2)	Dunn–Oliver Acadome (1,360); Montgomery, AL
January 13, 2020; 7:30 p.m.	at Alabama A&M	W 72–66	1–14 (1–2)	Elmore Gymnasium (875); Huntsville, AL
January 18, 2020; 4:00 p.m., YouTube	Alcorn State	L 73–105	1–15 (1–3)	Harrison HPER Complex (3,249); Itta Bena, MS
January 20, 2020; 5:30 p.m., YouTube	Southern	L 70–74	1–16 (1–4)	Harrison HPER Complex (2,078); Itta Bena, MS
January 25, 2020; 4:00 p.m.	at Texas Southern	L 67–80	1–17 (1–5)	H&PE Arena (1,712); Houston, TX
January 27, 2020; 7:30 p.m.	at Prairie View A&M	L 83–102	1–18 (1–6)	William J. Nicks Building (1,522); Prairie View, TX
February 1, 2020; 4:00 p.m., YouTube	Jackson State	L 65–85	1–19 (1–7)	Harrison HPER Complex (4,298); Itta Bena, MS
February 3, 2020; 7:30 p.m., YouTube	Grambling State	L 65–90	1–20 (1–8)	Harrison HPER Complex (906); Itta Bena, MS
February 8, 2020; 4:00 p.m., YouTube	Alabama State	L 74–87	1–21 (1–9)	Harrison HPER Complex (990); Itta Bena, MS
February 10, 2020; 7:30 p.m., YouTube	Alabama A&M	W 67–61	2–21 (2–9)	Harrison HPER Complex (680); Itta Bena, MS
February 15, 2020; 4:00 p.m.	at Alcorn State	L 88–92 ^{OT}	2–22 (2–10)	Davey Whitney Complex (315); Lorman, MS
February 17, 2020; 7:30 p.m.	at Southern	L 62–95	2–23 (2–11)	F. G. Clark Center (3,486); Baton Rouge, LA
February 22, 2020; 4:00 p.m., YouTube	Texas Southern	L 92–94	2–24 (2–12)	Harrison HPER Complex (987); Itta Bena, MS
February 24, 2020; 7:30 p.m., YouTube	Prairie View A&M	L 69–88	2–25 (2–13)	Harrison HPER Complex (987); Itta Bena, MS
February 29, 2020; 4:00 p.m.	at Jackson State	L 70–87	2–26 (2–14)	Williams Assembly Center (1,021); Jackson, MS
March 2, 2020; 7:30 p.m.	at Grambling State	L 61–81	2–27 (2–15)	Fredrick C. Hobdy Assembly Center (1,401); Grambling, LA
March 7, 2020; 7:30 p.m.	at Arkansas–Pine Bluff	W 74–71	3–27 (3–15)	K. L. Johnson Complex (2,932); Pine Bluff, AR
*Non-conference game. ^{#}Rankings from AP poll. (#) Tournament seedings in parentheses. All times are in Central.

== Statistics ==
SWAC leaders

- Michael Green – scoring (17.6 points per game)
