= 2019–20 Alabama A&M Bulldogs basketball team =

American college basketball season

2019–20 Alabama A&M Bulldogs basketball
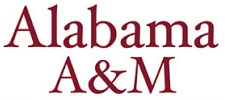
- Conference: Southwestern Athletic Conference
- Record: 8–22 (5–13 SWAC)
- Head coach: Dylan Howard (2nd season)
- Assistant coaches: Derrick Tilmon; Antwain Banks; Carl Richburg
- Home arena: Elmore Gymnasium

2019–20 SWAC men's basketball standings
	Conf.				Overall
Team	W		L	PCT	W		L	PCT
Prairie View A&M	14	–	4	.778	19	–	13	.594
Southern	13	–	5	.722	17	–	15	.531
Texas Southern	12	–	6	.667	16	–	16	.500
Grambling State	11	–	7	.611	17	–	15	.531
Jackson State	11	–	7	.611	15	–	17	.469
Alcorn State	11	–	7	.611	15	–	15	.500
Alabama State	7	–	11	.389	8	–	24	.250
Alabama A&M	5	–	13	.278	8	–	22	.267
Arkansas–Pine Bluff	3	–	15	.167	4	–	26	.133
Mississippi Valley State	3	–	15	.167	3	–	27	.100
Note: The 2020 SWAC tournament was canceled prior to the semifinals due to the COVID-19 pandemic.

The 2019–20 Alabama A&M Bulldogs basketball team represented Alabama A&M University in the 2019–20 NCAA Division I men's basketball season. The Bulldogs, led by second-year head coach Dylan Howard, played their home games at the Elmore Gymnasium in Normal, Alabama as members of the Southwestern Athletic Conference. They finished the season 8–22, 5–13 in SWAC play to finish in eighth place. They lost in the quarterfinals of the SWAC tournament to Prairie View A&M.

== Previous season ==
The Bulldogs finished the 2018–19 season 5–27 overall, 4–14 in SWAC play, to finish in a tie for 9th place. For the second season in a row, Alabama A&M was ineligible for postseason play due to APR violations, preventing them from participating in the SWAC tournament.

== Roster ==
2019–20 Alabama A&M Bulldogs men's basketball team
Players
Coaches

Pos.	#	Name	Height	Weight	Year	Hometown
F	0	TJ Parham	6 ft 7 in (2.01 m)	210 lb (95 kg)	GS	Chicago, Illinois
F	1	Mason Ellison	6 ft 6 in (1.98 m)	192 lb (87 kg)	Fr	Huntsville, Alabama
G	2	Brandon Miller	6 ft 0 in (1.83 m)	170 lb (77 kg)	Jr	Huntsville, Alabama
G	3	Cameron Tucker	6 ft 1 in (1.85 m)	170 lb (77 kg)	Fr	Birmingham, Alabama
F	5	Jalen Johnson	6 ft 7 in (2.01 m)	215 lb (98 kg)	Fr	Indianapolis, Indiana
G	10	Garrett Hicks	6 ft 0 in (1.83 m)	160 lb (73 kg)	Fr	Madison, Alabama
G	12	Brandon Powell	6 ft 4 in (1.93 m)	205 lb (93 kg)	So	Huntsville, Alabama
G	13	Cameron Alford	6 ft 1 in (1.85 m)	200 lb (91 kg)	Fr	Brownsburg, Indiana
C	15	EJ Williams	6 ft 10 in (2.08 m)	275 lb (125 kg)	Fr	Middletown, Ohio
F	22	Gerron Scissum	6 ft 8 in (2.03 m)	210 lb (95 kg)	Sr	Huntsville, Alabama
F	24	Evan Wiley	6 ft 6 in (1.98 m)	210 lb (95 kg)	Sr	Huntsville, Alabama
F	30	Brandon Houston	6 ft 7 in (2.01 m)	240 lb (109 kg)	Jr	Birmingham, Alabama
G	34	Walter Jones Jr	6 ft 5 in (1.96 m)	180 lb (82 kg)	Sr	Greensboro, Alabama
F	35	Tremere Brown	6 ft 8 in (2.03 m)	210 lb (95 kg)	Fr	Phenix City, Alabama

Head coach

- Dylan Howard (UAB)

Assistant coach(es)

- Derrick Tilmon (Hiwassee)
- Antwain Banks (IU Southeast)
- Carl Richburg (Miami (OH))

Legend

- (C) Team captain
- (S) Suspended
- (I) Ineligible
- (W) Walk-on
- Injured
- Current redshirt

Roster
Last update: December 8, 2019

== Schedule and results ==
Date time, TV	Rank^{#}	Opponent^{#}	Result	Record	Site (attendance) city, state
Non-conference regular season
November 5, 2019*; 7:00 pm		at Tennessee State	L 66–106	0–1	Gentry Complex (5,638); Nashville, TN
November 11, 2019*; 7:00 pm		at UAB	L 52–74	0–2	Bartow Arena (2,880); Birmingham, AL
November 14, 2019*; 7:00 pm		at Cincinnati	L 53–85	0–3	Fifth Third Arena (9,830); Cincinnati, OH
November 16, 2019*; 12:00 pm		at Miami (OH)	L 63–79	0–4	Millett Hall (1,480); Oxford, OH
November 21, 2019*; 7:00 pm		at Clemson	L 51–87	0–5	Littlejohn Coliseum (5,616); Clemson, SC
November 25, 2019*; 7:00 pm		Troy	W 80–66	1–5	Elmore Gymnasium (586); Normal, AL
December 7, 2019*; 4:00 pm		Jacksonville State	W 67–62 ^{OT}	2–5	Elmore Gymnasium (780); Normal, AL
December 14, 2019*; 2:00 pm, ACCN		at Miami (FL)	L 74–88	2–6	Watsco Center (4,649); Coral Gables, FL
December 17, 2019*; 7:00 pm, ESPN+		at South Alabama	L 79–89	2–7	Mitchell Center (1,545); Mobile, AL
December 20, 2019*; 6:00 pm		North Alabama	W 92–80	3–7	Elmore Gymnasium (891); Normal, AL
December 29, 2019*; 2:00 pm, ACCNX		at Notre Dame	L 56–82	3–8	Edmund P. Joyce Center (8,181); South Bend, IN
SWAC regular season
January 4, 2020; 5:30 pm		at Grambling State	L 60–70	3–9 (0–1)	Fredrick C. Hobdy Assembly Center; Grambling, LA
January 6, 2020; 7:30 pm		at Jackson State	W 66–57	4–9 (1–1)	Williams Assembly Center (295); Jackson, MS
January 11, 2020; 6:00 pm		Arkansas–Pine Bluff	W 59–49	5–9 (2–1)	Elmore Gymnasium (1,201); Normal, AL
January 13, 2020; 7:30 pm		Mississippi Valley State	L 66–72	5–10 (2–2)	Elmore Gymnasium (875); Normal, AL
January 18, 2020; 5:00 pm		vs. Alabama State	L 56–65	5–11 (2–3)	Bill Harris Arena (3,126); Birmingham, AL
January 25, 2020; 5:30 pm		at Alcorn State	L 58–59	5–12 (2–4)	Davey Whitney Complex (388); Lorman, MS
January 27, 2020; 7:30 pm		at Southern	L 46–67	5–13 (2–5)	F. G. Clark Center (4,127); Baton Rouge, LA
February 1, 2020; 6:00 pm		Texas Southern	L 73–82	5–14 (2–6)	Elmore Gymnasium (1,068); Normal, AL
February 3, 2020; 7:30 pm		Prairie View A&M	L 54–69	5–15 (2–7)	Elmore Gymnasium (1,187); Normal, AL
February 8, 2020; 7:30 pm		at Arkansas–Pine Bluff	W 58–54	6–15 (3–7)	K. L. Johnson Complex; Pine Bluff, AR
February 10, 2020; 7:30 pm		at Mississippi Valley State	L 61–67	6–16 (3–8)	Harrison HPER Complex (680); Itta Bena, MS
February 15, 2020; 5:00 pm		at Alabama State	L 58–61	6–17 (3–9)	Dunn–Oliver Acadome (3,318); Montgomery, AL
February 22, 2020; 6:00 pm		Alcorn State	W 71–61	7–17 (4–9)	Elmore Gymnasium (1,155); Normal, AL
February 24, 2020; 7:30 pm		Southern	L 37–64	7–18 (4–10)	Elmore Gymnasium (1,024); Normal, AL
February 29, 2020; 7:30 pm		at Texas Southern	L 58–85	7–19 (4–11)	H&PE Arena (979); Houston, TX
March 2, 2020; 8:00 pm		at Prairie View A&M	L 62–73	7–20 (4–12)	William Nicks Building (796); Prairie View, TX
March 5, 2020; 7:30 pm		Grambling State	W 58–57	8–20 (5–12)	Elmore Gymnasium (936); Normal, AL
March 7, 2020; 6:00 pm		Jackson State	L 51–54	8–21 (5–13)	Elmore Gymnasium (1,291); Normal, AL
SWAC tournament
March 10, 2020; 5:30 pm, ESPN3	(8)	at (1) Prairie View A&M; First round	L 60–82	8–22	William Nicks Building (789); Prairie View, TX
*Non-conference game. ^{#}Rankings from AP Poll. (#) Tournament seedings in parentheses. All times are in Central.
