= 2020 SWAC men's basketball tournament =

- Classification: Division I
- Season: 2019–20
- Teams: 8
- Site: Bartow Arena; Birmingham, Alabama
- First round site: Campus sites
- Television: ESPN3, ESPNU

2019–20 SWAC men's basketball standings
	Conf.				Overall
Team	W		L	PCT	W		L	PCT
Prairie View A&M	14	–	4	.778	19	–	13	.594
Southern	13	–	5	.722	17	–	15	.531
Texas Southern	12	–	6	.667	16	–	16	.500
Grambling State	11	–	7	.611	17	–	15	.531
Jackson State	11	–	7	.611	15	–	17	.469
Alcorn State	11	–	7	.611	15	–	15	.500
Alabama State	7	–	11	.389	8	–	24	.250
Alabama A&M	5	–	13	.278	8	–	22	.267
Arkansas–Pine Bluff	3	–	15	.167	4	–	26	.133
Mississippi Valley State	3	–	15	.167	3	–	27	.100
Note: The 2020 SWAC tournament was canceled prior to the semifinals due to the COVID-19 pandemic.

The 2020 SWAC men's basketball tournament was the postseason men's basketball tournament for the Southwestern Athletic Conference during the 2019–20 season. Tournament first-round games were played at the campus of the higher seeded team on March 10. The remainder of the tournament was to be held on March 13 and 14, 2020 at Bartow Arena in Birmingham, Alabama. The tournament champion would have received the SWAC's automatic bid to the 2020 NCAA tournament. On March 12, the remainder of the SWAC Tournament, along with all other NCAA postseason tournaments, was cancelled amid the COVID-19 pandemic.

== Seeds ==
The top eight teams qualified for the conference tournament. Teams were seeded by conference record, with a tiebreaker system used for teams with identical conference records. The top 4 seeds hosted their quarterfinal round games.

Seed	School	Conference	Tiebreaker
1	Prairie View A&M	14–4	
2	Southern	13–5	
3	Texas Southern	12–6	
4	Jackson State	11–7	3–1 vs. Grambling State/Alcorn State
5	Alcorn State	11–7	Better point differential in season split with Grambling State
6	Grambling State	11–7	Worse point differential in season split with Alcorn State
7	Alabama State	7–11	
8	Alabama A&M	5–13	

== Schedule and results ==
Game	Time	Matchup	Score	Television
Quarterfinals – Tuesday, March 10 – campus sites
1	5:30 pm	No. 8 Alabama A&M at No. 1 Prairie View A&M	60–82	ESPN3
2	7:30 pm	No. 5 Alcorn State at No. 4 Jackson State	52–69	ESPN3
3	7:30 pm	No. 7 Alabama State at No. 2 Southern	53–67	ESPN3
4	8:00 pm	No. 6 Grambling State at No. 3 Texas Southern	62–75	ESPN3
Semifinals – Friday, March 13 – Bartow Arena, Birmingham, AL
5	cancelled	No. 1 Prairie View A&M vs. No. 4 Jackson State	N/A	ESPN3
6	cancelled	No. 2 Southern vs. No. 3 Texas Southern	N/A	ESPN3
Final – Saturday, March 14 – Bartow Arena, Birmingham, AL
7	cancelled	Game 5 winner vs. Game 6 winner	N/A	ESPNU
Game times in CST. Rankings denote tournament seed.

== Bracket ==
Quarterfinals; March 10; ESPN3
1	Prairie View A&M	82
8	Alabama A&M	60
4	Jackson State	69
5	Alcorn State	52
2	Southern	67
7	Alabama State	53
3	Texas Southern	75
6	Grambling State	62

Semifinals; March 13; ESPN3
1	Prairie View A&M
4	Jackson State
2	Southern
3	Texas Southern

Championship; March 14; ESPNU

First round games at campus sites of lower-numbered seeds
