= Dylan Howard (basketball) =

American basketball coach

Current position
- Title: Assistant coach
- Team: Jackson State
- Conference: SWAC

Biographical details
- Born: Fort Wayne, Indiana, U.S.

Playing career
- 1985–1989: UAB

Coaching career (HC unless noted)
- 1996–2000: Saint Francis (IN) (assistant)
- 2000–2001: Robert Morris (assistant)
- 2001–2008: Hardin–Simmons
- 2008–2011: Mississippi Valley State (assistant)
- 2011–2012: North Park
- 2012–2017: Morehead State (assistant)
- 2017–2018: Alabama A&M (assistant)
- 2018–2022: Alabama A&M
- 2022–2023: Southern (assistant)
- 2023–2024: Oakwood (assistant)
- 2024–present: Jackson State (women's assistant)

Head coaching record
- Overall: 115–198 (.367)

Dylan Howard is an American basketball coach who is currently an assistant coach for the Jackson State Lady Tigers basketball team. He is the former head coach of the Alabama A&M Bulldogs men's basketball team.

== Playing career ==
Howard played college basketball at UAB under Gene Bartow. He was part of two Blazers' NCAA Tournament appearances in 1986 and 1987, as well as the team's 1989 NIT semifinals appearance.

== Coaching career ==
Beginning his coaching career in his hometown of Fort Wayne, Indiana, Howard became an assistant coach at the University of Saint Francis where he was on staff for four seasons before joining the coaching staff at Robert Morris. In 2001, Howard was named the head coach at Division III Hardin–Simmons. In his tenure with the Cowboys, Howard compiled a 78–103 record, while guiding the team to its first-ever league tournament appearance and league finals appearance, being named American Southwest Conference Coach of the Year in 2005. Howard would return to the Division I ranks joining Sean Woods's staff at Mississippi Valley State from 2008 to 2011. After a one-year stint as head coach at North Park University, Howard reunited with Woods at Morehead State.

In 2017, Howard became an assistant coach at Alabama A&M under Donnie Marsh. When Marsh departed for an assistant coaching position at Florida Gulf Coast in 2018, Howard was named the interim head coach for the 2018–19 season. After a 5–27 record under the interim title, Alabama A&M lifted the interim title.

== Head coaching record ==
=== NCAA DIII ===
Record table
Season	Team	Overall	Conference	Standing	Postseason
Hardin–Simmons (ASC) (2001–2008)
2001–02	Hardin–Simmons	2–22	1–13	8th (West)	
2002–03	Hardin–Simmons	5–20	2–12	7th (West)	
2003–04	Hardin–Simmons	7–18	5–9	6th (West)	
2004–05	Hardin–Simmons	19–8	16–6	2nd (West)	
2005–06	Hardin–Simmons	14–11	13–9	5th (West)	
2006–07	Hardin–Simmons	16–12	14–7	3rd (West)	
2007–08	Hardin–Simmons	15–12	13–8	3rd (West)	
Hardin–Simmons:		78–103 (.431)	64–64 (.500)		
North Park (CCIW) (2011–2012)
2011–12	North Park	6–19	2–12	8th	
North Park:		6–19 (.240)	2–12 (.143)		
Total:		84–122 (.408)			
National champion Postseason invitational champion Conference regular season champion Conference regular season and conference tournament champion Division regular season champion Division regular season and conference tournament champion Conference tournament champion

=== NCAA DI ===
Record table
Season	Team	Overall	Conference	Standing	Postseason
Alabama A&M (SWAC) (2018–2022)
2018–19	Alabama A&M	5–27	4–14	10th	
2019–20	Alabama A&M	8–22	5–13	8th	
2020–21	Alabama A&M	6–9	4–9	7th	
2021–22	Alabama A&M	12–18	10–8	5th	
Alabama A&M:		31–76 (.290)	23–44 (.343)		
Total:		31–76 (.290)			
National champion Postseason invitational champion Conference regular season champion Conference regular season and conference tournament champion Division regular season champion Division regular season and conference tournament champion Conference tournament champion
