= 2019–20 Arkansas–Pine Bluff Golden Lions men's basketball team =

American college basketball season

2019–20 Arkansas–Pine Bluff Golden Lions men's basketball
- Conference: Southwestern Athletic Conference
- Record: 4–26 (3–15 SWAC)
- Head coach: George Ivory (12th season)
- Assistant coaches: Kenneth Broyles; Richard Cannon
- Home arena: K. L. Johnson Complex

2019–20 SWAC men's basketball standings
	Conf.				Overall
Team	W		L	PCT	W		L	PCT
Prairie View A&M	14	–	4	.778	19	–	13	.594
Southern	13	–	5	.722	17	–	15	.531
Texas Southern	12	–	6	.667	16	–	16	.500
Grambling State	11	–	7	.611	17	–	15	.531
Jackson State	11	–	7	.611	15	–	17	.469
Alcorn State	11	–	7	.611	15	–	15	.500
Alabama State	7	–	11	.389	8	–	24	.250
Alabama A&M	5	–	13	.278	8	–	22	.267
Arkansas–Pine Bluff	3	–	15	.167	4	–	26	.133
Mississippi Valley State	3	–	15	.167	3	–	27	.100
Note: The 2020 SWAC tournament was canceled prior to the semifinals due to the COVID-19 pandemic.

The 2019–20 Arkansas–Pine Bluff Golden Lions men's basketball team represented the University of Arkansas at Pine Bluff in the 2019–20 NCAA Division I men's basketball season. The Golden Lions, led by 12th-year head coach George Ivory, played their home games at the K. L. Johnson Complex in Pine Bluff, Arkansas as members of the Southwestern Athletic Conference. They finished the season 4–26, 3–15 in SWAC play to finish in a tie for ninth place. They failed to qualify for the SWAC tournament.

== Previous season ==
The Golden Lions finished the 2018–19 season 13–19 overall, 10–8 in SWAC play, to finish in a three-way tie for 3rd place. In the SWAC tournament, they were defeated by Grambling State in the quarterfinals.

== Roster ==
2019–20 Arkansas–Pine Bluff Golden Lions men's basketball team
Players
Coaches

Pos.	#	Name	Height	Weight	Year	Hometown
G	00	Kshun Stokes	6 ft 2 in (1.88 m)	175 lb (79 kg)	Fr	Headland, Alabama
G	1	Zavian Jackson	6 ft 3 in (1.91 m)	170 lb (77 kg)	RS Jr	Burlington, North Carolina
F	2	Marquell Carter	6 ft 6 in (1.98 m)	195 lb (88 kg)	Sr	Greenville, Mississippi
F	3	Markedric Bell	6 ft 7 in (2.01 m)	190 lb (86 kg)	Jr	Starkville, Mississippi
G	4	Jordan McNair	5 ft 8 in (1.73 m)	160 lb (73 kg)	RS Jr	Jacksonville, Arkansas
G	5	Anthony Davis Jr	5 ft 9 in (1.75 m)	165 lb (75 kg)	RS So	Shaw, Mississippi
G	10	Jamil Wilson	5 ft 11 in (1.8 m)	175 lb (79 kg)	Jr	Louisville, Kentucky
F	12	Terrance Banyard	6 ft 8 in (2.03 m)	215 lb (98 kg)	Jr	Milwaukee, Wisconsin
F	13	Robert Boyd	6 ft 6 in (1.98 m)	205 lb (93 kg)	Sr	Memphis, Tennessee
G	14	Marcus Wallace	6 ft 1 in (1.85 m)	180 lb (82 kg)	GS	Jackson, Mississippi
F	15	Alvin Stredic Jr	6 ft 8 in (2.03 m)	—	Fr	Bay City, Texas
F	21	Shaun Doss	6 ft 5 in (1.96 m)	185 lb (84 kg)	Jr	Marion, Arkansas
G	22	Khalid Campbell	6 ft 1 in (1.85 m)	175 lb (79 kg)	RS Jr	Greenwood, Mississippi
F	23	Dequan Morris	6 ft 4 in (1.93 m)	180 lb (82 kg)	Jr	Pine Bluff, Arkansas
F	24	Artavious McDyess	6 ft 10 in (2.08 m)	215 lb (98 kg)	RS Jr	Columbus, Mississippi
G	25	Isaiah Haralson	6 ft 2 in (1.88 m)	170 lb (77 kg)	Fr	Pearland, Texas
G	30	Cameron Posey	6 ft 2 in (1.88 m)	180 lb (82 kg)	Jr	Milwaukee, Wisconsin
C	33	Isaac Bassey	6 ft 11 in (2.11 m)	260 lb (118 kg)	Sr	Fallston, Maryland
F	34	Chris Smith	6 ft 8 in (2.03 m)	225 lb (102 kg)	RS Sr	Memphis, Tennessee
F	35	Kaezron Washington	6 ft 8 in (2.03 m)	220 lb (100 kg)	So	Pine Bluff, Arkansas
G	40	Nicholas Jones	6 ft 1 in (1.85 m)	—	Jr	Little Rock, Arkansas
G	44	William Ridgell	6 ft 1 in (1.85 m)	173 lb (78 kg)	Jr	Pine Bluff, Arkansas

Head coach

- George Ivory (Mississippi Valley State)

Assistant coach(es)

- Kenneth Broyles
- Richard Cannon (Mississippi Valley State)

Legend

- (C) Team captain
- (S) Suspended
- (I) Ineligible
- (W) Walk-on
- Injured
- Current redshirt

Roster
Last update: December 12, 2019

== Schedule and results ==
Date time, TV	Opponent	Result	Record	Site (attendance) city, state
Non-conference regular season
November 5, 2019*; 7:00 pm, ESPN3	at South Florida	L 41–70	0–1	Yuengling Center (4,495); Tampa, FL
November 9, 2019*; 7:00 pm, WCC Sports	at No. 8 Gonzaga	L 60–110	0–2	McCarthey Athletic Center (6,000); Spokane, WA
November 16, 2019*; 7:00 pm	at Grand Canyon	L 54–67	0–3	GCU Arena (7,150); Phoenix, AZ
November 19, 2019*; 7:00 pm, ESPN+	at Kansas State; Ft. Myers Tip-Off	L 51–62	0–4	Bramlage Coliseum (7,575); Manhattan, KS
November 21, 2019*; 6:00 pm, ACCN	at Pittsburgh; Ft. Myers Tip-Off	L 41–66	0–5	Petersen Events Center (7,068); Pittsburgh, PA
November 25, 2019*; 7:30 pm	Champion Christian	W 75–67	1–5	K. L. Johnson Complex (651); Pine Bluff, AR
December 4, 2019*; 7:00 pm, ESPN3	at Tulsa	L 39–72	1–6	Reynolds Center (2,781); Tulsa, OK
December 7, 2019*; 8:00 pm, C-USATV	at UTEP	L 50–59	1–7	Don Haskins Center (4,928); El Paso, TX
December 14, 2019*; 5:00 pm, P12N	at Oregon State	L 46–80	1–8	Gill Coliseum (3,946); Corvallis, OR
December 18, 2019*; 5:00 pm, WAC Digital	at New Mexico State	L 40–65	1–9	Pan American Center (4,288); Las Cruces, NM
December 21, 2019*; 5:00 pm	at North Texas	L 53–86	1–10	The Super Pit (2,057); Denton, TX
December 29, 2019*; 7:00 pm, P12N	at Washington State	L 50–65	1–11	Beasley Coliseum (2,122); Pullman, WA
SWAC regular season
January 4, 2020; 4:00 pm	at Mississippi Valley State	W 80–76	2–11 (1–0)	Harrison HPER Complex (3,089); Itta Bena, MS
January 11, 2020; 6:00 pm	at Alabama A&M	L 49–59	2–12 (1–1)	Elmore Gymnasium (1,201); Normal, AL
January 13, 2020; 7:30 pm	at Alabama State	W 61–56	3–12 (2–1)	Dunn–Oliver Acadome (1,893); Montgomery, AL
January 18, 2020; 7:00 pm	Southern	L 56–75	3–13 (2–2)	K. L. Johnson Complex (1,165); Pine Bluff, AR
January 20, 2020; 7:30 pm	Alcorn State	L 54–82	3–14 (2–3)	K. L. Johnson Complex (2,246); Pine Bluff, AR
January 25, 2020; 5:00 pm	at Prairie View A&M	L 54–67	3–15 (2–4)	William Nicks Building (346); Prairie View, TX
January 27, 2020; 7:30 pm	at Texas Southern	L 57–68	3–16 (2–5)	H&PE Arena (1,076); Houston, TX
February 1, 2020; 7:00 pm	Grambling State	L 47–49	3–17 (2–6)	K. L. Johnson Complex (3,146); Pine Bluff, AR
February 3, 2020; 7:30 pm	Jackson State	L 45–49	3–18 (2–7)	K. L. Johnson Complex (3,269); Pine Bluff, AR
February 8, 2020; 7:00 pm	Alabama A&M	L 54–58	3–19 (2–8)	K. L. Johnson Complex; Pine Bluff, AR
February 10, 2020; 7:30 pm	Alabama State	L 49–57	3–20 (2–9)	K. L. Johnson Complex; Pine Bluff, AR
February 15, 2020; 5:30 pm	at Southern	L 49–73	3–21 (2–10)	F. G. Clark Center (3,989); Baton Rouge, LA
February 17, 2020; 7:30 pm	at Alcorn State	L 52–60	3–22 (2–11)	Davey Whitney Complex (359); Lorman, MS
February 22, 2020; 7:00 pm	Prairie View A&M	L 61–69	3–23 (2–12)	K. L. Johnson Complex (1,465); Pine Bluff, AR
February 24, 2020; 7:30 pm	Texas Southern	W 74–72 ^{OT}	4–23 (3–12)	K. L. Johnson Complex (1,376); Pine Bluff, AR
February 29, 2020; 5:30 pm	at Grambling State	L 46–60	4–24 (3–13)	Fredrick C. Hobdy Assembly Center (1,220); Grambling, LA
March 2, 2020; 7:30 pm	at Jackson State	L 56–76	4–25 (3–14)	Williams Assembly Center (1,207); Jackson, MS
March 7, 2020; 7:30 pm	Mississippi Valley State	L 71–74	4–26 (3–15)	K. L. Johnson Complex (2,932); Pine Bluff, AR
*Non-conference game. ^{#}Rankings from AP Poll. (#) Tournament seedings in parentheses. All times are in Central.
