= Landon Bussie =

American basketball coach (born 1987)

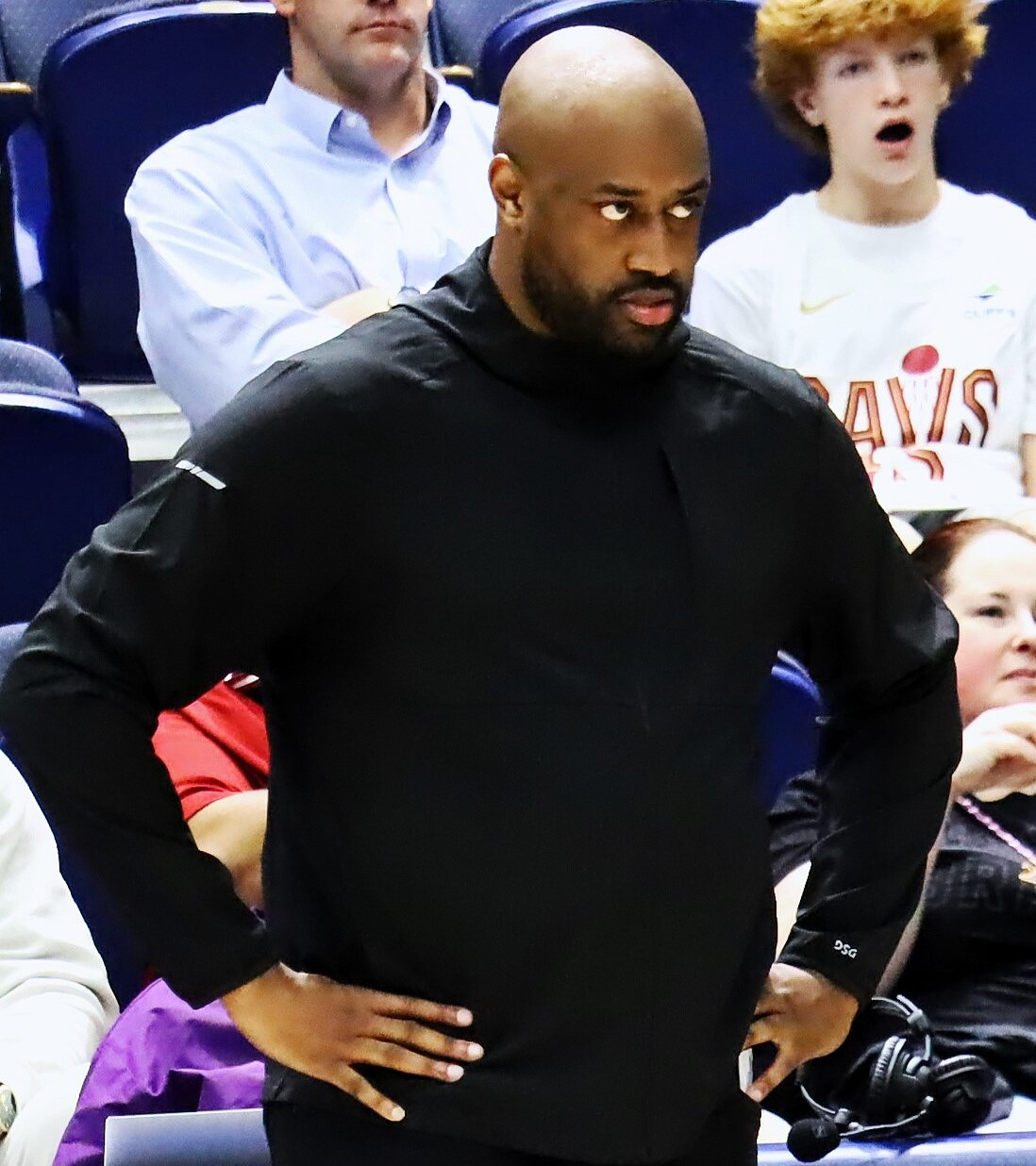
- Bussie with Alcorn State in 2024

Current position
- Title: Head coach
- Team: Chicago State
- Conference: NEC
- Record: 7–25 (.219)

Biographical details
- Born: November 11, 1987 (age 39)

Playing career
- 2005–2007: Livingstone
- 2008–2010: Xavier (LA)

Coaching career (HC unless noted)

Men's basketball
- 2010–2013: Xavier (LA) (assistant)
- 2014–2020: Prairie View A&M (assistant)
- 2020–2025: Alcorn State
- 2025–present: Chicago State

Women's basketball
- 2013–2014: Prairie View A&M (assistant)

Head coaching record
- Overall: 73–108 (.403)
- Tournaments: 0–2 (NIT)

Accomplishments and honors

Championships
- 2 SWAC regular season (2022, 2023)

Awards
- 2× SWAC Coach of the Year (2022, 2023)

Landon Everett Bussie (born November 11, 1987) is an American college basketball coach who is the current head coach of Chicago State.

== Playing career ==
Bussie played his first two years at Livingstone College before finishing his playing career at Xavier University of Louisiana (XULA).

== Coaching career ==
=== XULA ===
Bussie started his coaching career at his alma mater. He was an assistant coach at XULA for four seasons.

=== Prairie View A&M ===
Bussie was first hired by Prairie View A&M as the women's assistant coach in 2013. Bussie then switched over to the men's side in 2014. Bussie is credited with recruiting several key contributors to the team.

=== Alcorn State ===
On April 23, 2020 Bussie was named the new head men's basketball coach at Alcorn State. He replaced Montez Robinson, who had one winning season in five years.

=== Chicago State ===
On March 20, 2025, Bussie was named the new head men's basketball coach at Chicago State, replacing Scott Spinelli.

== Head coaching record ==
Record table
Season	Team	Overall	Conference	Standing	Postseason
Alcorn State Braves (Southwestern Athletic Conference) (2020–2025)
2020–21	Alcorn State	6–13	6–7	6th	
2021–22	Alcorn State	17–17	14–4	1st	NIT First Round
2022–23	Alcorn State	18–14	15–3	T–1st	NIT First Round
2023–24	Alcorn State	14–18	13–5	2nd	
2024–25	Alcorn State	11–21	11–7	6th	
Alcorn State:		66–83 (.443)	59–26 (.694)		
Chicago State Cougars (Northeast Conference) (2025–present)
2025–26	Chicago State	7–25	5–13	T–11th	
2026–27	Chicago State	2–4	0–0		
Chicago State:		9–29 (.237)	5–13 (.278)		
Total:		75–112 (.401)			

== Personal life ==
Bussie is the brother of WNBA player Asya Bussie.
