= Montez Robinson =

American basketball coach

Current position
- Title: Head coach
- Team: Fort Valley State
- Conference: SIAC
- Record: 28–47 (.373)

Biographical details
- Born: Birmingham, Alabama, U.S.

Playing career
- 1998–2000: Kemper Military
- 2000–2002: North Georgia

Coaching career (HC unless noted)
- 2002–2005: Truett McConnell (assistant)
- 2005–2011: Kennesaw State (assistant)
- 2011–2015: Bethune–Cookman (assistant)
- 2015–2020: Alcorn State
- 2020–2021: UT Martin (interim HC)
- 2022–present: Fort Valley State

Head coaching record
- Overall: 105–149 (.413)

Accomplishments and honors

Awards
- SWAC Coach of the Year (2017); NABC District 23 Coach of the Year (2017)

Montez Robinson is an American college basketball coach, currently serving as the head coach of Fort Valley State Basketball. He previously served as the interim. Head Coach of UT Martin Basketball.

== Playing career ==
Robinson started his college career at Kemper Military, where he was a two-year starter and captain. He completed his playing career at North Georgia.

== Coaching career ==
After graduation, Robinson started his coaching career at Truett McConnell, before joining Tony Ingle's staff at Kennesaw State, where he stayed until 2011. After five years on the staff of Bethune-Cookman, Robinson was named head coach at Alcorn State, taking over for Luther Riley.

In his first season with the Braves, Robinson guided the team from a ninth-place finish the seasons before to a second-place finish and 15–15 overall record. In 2016–17, Robinson was named SWAC Coach of the Year after another second-place finish for the Braves, and an 18–14 overall record.

In March 2020, director of athletics Derek Horne announced that the school would not renew Robinson's contract, ending his five-year tenure at Alcorn State.

On September 11, 2020, Stewart was hired by UT Martin as an assistant coach under Anthony Stewart. On November 17, two days after the sudden death of Stewart, Robinson was named the interim head coach of the Skyhawks for the 2020–21 season.

== Head coaching record ==
Record table
Season	Team	Overall	Conference	Standing	Postseason
Alcorn State Braves (Southwestern Athletic Conference) (2015–2020)
2015–16	Alcorn State	15–15	13–5	2nd	
2016–17	Alcorn State	18–14	13–5	2nd	
2017–18	Alcorn State	11–21	7–11	8th	
2018–19	Alcorn State	10–21	6–12	T–7th	
2019–20	Alcorn State	15–15	11–7	T–4th	
Alcorn State:		69–86 (.445)	50–40 (.556)		
UT Martin Skyhawks (Ohio Valley Conference) (2020–2021)
2020–21	UT Martin	8–16	6–14	T–9th	
UT Martin:		8–16 (.333)	6–14 (.300)		
Total:		77–102 (.430)			
